= List of All England mixed doubles champions =

Badminton championships

All England Open Badminton Championships Mixed Doubles Champions
- Location: Birmingham; United Kingdom
- Venue: Utilita Arena Birmingham
- Governing body: NEC Group
- Created: 1899; 127 years ago
- Editions: Total: 115; Open era (since 1980): 45
- Prize money: $107,300 (2025)
- Trophy: Mixed Doubles Trophy
- Website: allenglandbadminton.com

Most titles
- Amateur era: 8: George Alan Thomas; 8: Betty Uber; 8: Finn Kobberø
- Open era: 5: Chung Myung-hee; 5: Park Joo-bong; 5: Ra Kyung-min; 5: Gao Ling

Most consecutive titles
- Amateur era: 7: Betty Uber
- Open era: 3: Chung Myung-hee; 3: Park Joo-bong; 3: Gao Ling; 3: Tontowi Ahmad; 3: Liliyana Natsir

Current champion
- Guo Xinwa; Chen Fanghui – 2025 (1st title)

The champions and runners-up of the All England Open Badminton Championships Mixed Doubles tournament, first introduced to the championship in 1899. From 1915 to 1919, and from 1940 to 1946, no competition was held due to the two World Wars.

== History ==
In the Amateur era, George Alan Thomas (1903, 1906-1907, 1911, 1914, 1920-1922), Betty Uber (1930-1936, 1938) and Finn Kobberø (1955, 1957, 1960-1963, 1965-1966) jointly holds the record for the most titles in the Mixed Doubles, winning All England eight times. Betty Uber holds the record for most consecutive titles with seven from 1930 to 1936.

Since the Open era of badminton began in late 1979 with the inclusion of professional badminton players from around the world in 1980, Chung Myung-hee and Park Joo-bong (1989-1991), Gao Ling (2006-2008), Tontowi Ahmad and Liliyana Natsir (2012-2014), share the record for most consecutive victories with three.

Gillian Perrin, Nora Gardner, Mike Tredgett, Steen Skovgaard, Christian Hadinata and Imelda Wiguna are the only players in history to reach the All England Open Badminton Mixed Doubles Final in both the Amateur and Open era. Gilks managed to do so a total of nine times, winning four, Gardner ten, Tredgett six, both winning twice, Skovgaard twice but never won and Hadinata, partnering Wiguna, thrice but winless in the Open era.

== Finalists ==
=== Amateur era ===
Year	Champions	Runners–up	Score
1899	(England) D. Oakes (England) Daisy St. John	(England) Collins (England) W. L. Lincoln	15–8 15–3
1900	(England) D. Oakes (England) Daisy St. John	(England) Meriel Lucas (England) Herbert Mellersh	15–12, 15–12
1901	(England) F. S. Collier (England) Ellen Mary Stawell–Brown	(England) Cammell (England) Stewart Marsden Massey	15–8, 5–15, 18–17
1902	(England) E. Moseley (England) Leonard Ransford	(England) Herbert Mellersh (England) Ethel Warneford Thomson	15–8, 15–11
1903	(England) George Alan Thomas (England) Ethel Warneford Thomson	(England) Cammell (England) Stewart Marsden Massey	
1904	(England) Dorothea K. Douglass (England) Henry Norman Marrett	(England) Meriel Lucas (England) Albert Davis Prebble	15–6, 15–12
1905	(England) Hazel Hogarth (England) Henry Norman Marrett	(England) George Alan Thomas (England) Ethel Warneford Thomson	15–8, 15–2
1906	(England) George Alan Thomas (England) Ethel Warneford Thomson	(England) G. L. Murray (England) Norman Wood	17–16, 15–3
1907	(England) G. L. Murray (England) George Alan Thomas	(England) Penelope Dora Harvey Boothby (England) Albert Davis Prebble	18–17, 15–1
1908	(England) Meriel Lucas (England) Norman Wood	(England) G. L. Murray (England) George Alan Thomas	15–9, 15–3
1909	(England) Penelope Dora Harvey Boothby (England) Albert Davis Prebble	(England) Frank Chesterton (England) Meriel Lucas	15–9, 18–17
1910	(England) Dorothy Cundall (England) Guy A. Sautter	(England) Frank Chesterton (England) Meriel Lucas	7–15, 15–9, 15–10
1911	(England) Margaret Larminie (England) George Alan Thomas	(England) Alice Gowenlock (England) Henry Norman Marrett	15–11, 9–15, 15–7
1912	(England) Edward Hawthorn (England) Hazel Hogarth	(England) Percy Fitton (England) Lavinia Radeglia	17–16, 15–9
1913	(England) U. N. Lapin (Guy A. Sautter) (England) M. E. Mayston	(England) Edward Hawthorn (England) Hazel Hogarth	15–13, 15–6
1914	(England) Hazel Hogarth (England) George Alan Thomas	(England) Frank Chesterton (England) Margaret Tragett	15–10, 15–12
1915–1919	No competition		
1920	(England) Hazel Hogarth (England) George Alan Thomas	(England) Penelope Dora Harvey Boothby (England) Guy A. Sautter	15–12, 15–12
1921	(England) Hazel Hogarth (England) George Alan Thomas	(Ireland) Frank Devlin (Ireland) E. F. Stewart	15–9, 15–3
1922	(England) Hazel Hogarth (England) George Alan Thomas	(England) A. Fee (Archibald Engelbach) (England) Kitty McKane	15–9, 15–4
1923	(Republic of Ireland) Gordon Mack (England) Margaret Rivers Tragett	(England) Hazel Hogarth (England) George Alan Thomas	15–10, 15–7
1924	(Republic of Ireland) Frank Devlin (England) Kitty McKane	(England) Hazel Hogarth (England) George Alan Thomas	8–15, 15–11, 15–9
1925	(Republic of Ireland) Frank Devlin (England) Kitty McKane	(England) Violet Elton (England) Frank Hodge	15–3, 15–9
1926	(Republic of Ireland) Frank Devlin (England) Eveline G. Peterson	(Republic of Ireland) A. M. Head (Republic of Ireland) Gordon Mack	15–5, 15–9
1927	(Republic of Ireland) Frank Devlin (England) Eveline G. Peterson	(England) Hazel Hogarth (England) George Alan Thomas	15–11, 15–11
1928	(England) Albert Harbot (England) Margaret Rivers Tragett	(England) Hazel Hogarth (England) George Alan Thomas	15–7, 15–9
1929	(Republic of Ireland) Frank Devlin (England) Marian Horsley	(England) Betty Uber (England) Herbert Uber	15–8, 15–6
1930	(England) Betty Uber (England) Herbert Uber	(England) B. P. Cook (England) C. M. Patten	18–13, 15–4
1931	(England) Betty Uber (England) Herbert Uber	(Republic of Ireland) Frank Devlin (England) Marian Horsley	8–15, 15–8, 15–9
1932	(England) Betty Uber (England) Herbert Uber	(England) Hazel Hogarth (England) Raymond M. White	18–16, 15–9
1933	(England) Donald C. Hume (England) Betty Uber	(Republic of Ireland) Willoughby Hamilton (England) Marian Horsley	18–15, 15–4
1934	(England) Donald C. Hume (England) Betty Uber	(England) Marian Horsley (Republic of Ireland) Ian Maconachie	15–12, 15–10
1935	(England) Donald C. Hume (England) Betty Uber	(England) M. Armstrong (England) Raymond M. White	15–3, 15–1
1936	(England) Donald C. Hume (England) Betty Uber	(England) Thelma Kingsbury (Republic of Ireland) Ian Maconachie	18–15, 15–8
1937	(England) Thelma Kingsbury (Republic of Ireland) Ian Maconachie	(England) Ralph Nichols (Scotland) J. W. Stewart	15–11, 15–12
1938	(England) Raymond M. White (England) Betty Uber	(England) Ralph Nichols (England) Bessie Staples	15–10, 15–9
1939	(England) Ralph C. F. Nichols (England) Bessie Staples	(Republic of Ireland) Mavis Macnaughton (Republic of Ireland) James Rankin	15–10, 6–15, 15–8
1940–1946	No competition		
1947	(Denmark) Tonny Ahm (Denmark) Poul Holm	(Denmark) Tage Madsen (Denmark) Kirsten Thorndahl	15–13, 13–15, 15–12
1948	(Denmark) Jørn Skaarup (Denmark) Kirsten Thorndahl	(Sweden) Conny Jepsen (Denmark) Aase Svendsen	15–10, 15–2
1949	Clinton Stephens; Patsey Stephens	Queenie Allen; Wynn Rogers	15–5, 2–15, 15–12
1950	(Denmark) Tonny Ahm (Denmark) Poul Holm	(Denmark) Birgit Rostgaard Frohne (Denmark) Jørn Skaarup	15–3, 15–4
1951	(Denmark) Tonny Ahm (Denmark) Poul Holm	(Denmark) Avre Lossman (Denmark) Kirsten Thorndahl	8–15, 15–2, 15–4
1952	(Denmark) Tonny Ahm (Denmark) Poul Holm	(Denmark) Ole Jensen (Denmark) Aase Schiøtt Jacobsen	15–4, 10–15, 15–7
1953	(Federation of Malaya) David Ewe Leong Choong (England) June White	(Denmark) Agnete Friis (Denmark) Poul Holm	15–6, 15–10
1954	(England) John Best (England) Iris Cooley	(Denmark) Inge Birgit Hansen (Denmark) Finn Kobberø	15–12, 15–0
1955	(Denmark) Finn Kobberø (Denmark) Kirsten Thorndahl	(Federation of Malaya) David Ewe Leong Choong (England) June White	15–7, 15–13
1956	(England) Tony Jordan (England) June White Timperley	(Denmark) Jørgen Hammergaard Hansen (Denmark) Anni Jørgensen	18–15, 15–8
1957	(Denmark) Finn Kobberø (Denmark) Kirsten Thorndahl	(Denmark) Jørgen Hammergaard Hansen (Denmark) Anni Jørgensen	15–3, 15–6
1958	(England) Tony Jordan (England) June Timperley	(Denmark) Finn Kobberø (Denmark) Aase Winther	15–9, 7–15 15–5
1959	(Denmark) Inge Birgit Hansen (Denmark) Poul Erik Nielsen	(Denmark) Kirsten Granlund (Denmark) Jørgen Hammergaard Hansen	14–17, 15–7, 15–3
1960	(Denmark) Kirsten Granlund (Denmark) Finn Kobberø	(Denmark) Inge Birgit Hansen (Denmark) Poul Erik Nielsen	15–7, 15–2
1961	(Denmark) Kirsten Granlund (Denmark) Finn Kobberø	(England) Tony Jordan (England) June Timperley	15–12, 15–5
1962	(Denmark) Finn Kobberø (Denmark) Ulla Rasmussen	(Denmark) Inge Birgit Hansen (Denmark) Poul Erik Nielsen	15–1, 15–11
1963	(Denmark) Finn Kobberø (Denmark) Ulla Rasmussen	(England) Tony Jordan (England) June Timperley	15–8 15–12
1964	(England) Tony Jordan (England) Jenny Pritchard	(Denmark) Finn Kobberø (Denmark) Ulla Strand	15–10, 18–13
1965	(Denmark) Finn Kobberø (Denmark) Ulla Strand	(England) Tony Jordan (England) Jenny Pritchard	9–15, 15–4, 15–12
1966	(Denmark) Finn Kobberø (Denmark) Ulla Strand	(Denmark) Pernille Mølgaard Hansen (Denmark) Per Walsøe	15–13, 15–3
1967	(Denmark) Svend Pri (Denmark) Ulla Strand	(Denmark) Pernille Mølgaard Hansen (Denmark) Per Walsøe	15–2, 15–10
1968	(England) Tony Jordan (England) Susan Whetnall	(Scotland) Robert McCoig (Scotland) Muriel Woodcock	15–6, 15–8
1969	(England) Roger Mills (England) Gillian Perrin	(England) Tony Jordan (England) Susan Whetnall	9–15, 15–5, 15–12
1970	(Denmark) Pernille Mølgaard Hansen (Denmark) Per Walsøe	(Germany) Wolfgang Bochow (Germany) Irmgard Latz	17–14, 15–12
1971	(Denmark) Svend Pri (Denmark) Ulla Strand	(England) Gillian Gilks (England) Derek Talbot	15–12, 8–15, 15–11
1972	(Denmark) Svend Pri (Denmark) Ulla Strand	(England) Gillian Gilks (England) Derek Talbot	12–15, 15–8, 15–12
1973	(England) Gillian Gilks (England) Derek Talbot	(England) Nora Gardner (England) Elliott C. Stuart	9–15, 15–13, 15–8
1974	(England) David Eddy (England) Susan Whetnall	(England) Gillian Gilks (England) Derek Talbot	15–5, 7–15, 15–10
1975	(England) Nora Gardner (England) Elliott C. Stuart	(Germany) Roland Maywald (Germany) Brigitte Steden	15–9, 15–3
1976	(England) Gillian Gilks (England) Derek Talbot	(England) Nora Gardner (England) Mike Tredgett	15–9, 15–12
1977	(England) Gillian Gilks (England) Derek Talbot	(England) Nora Perry (England) Mike Tredgett	15–9, 15–9
1978	(England) Nora Perry (England) Mike Tredgett	(Denmark) Lene Køppen (Denmark) Steen Skovgaard	15–x, 15–4
1979	(Indonesia) Christian Hadinata (Indonesia) Imelda Wiguna	(England) Nora Perry (England) Mike Tredgett	15–1, 18–17

=== Open era ===
Year	Champions	Runners-up	Score
1980	(England) Nora Perry (England) Mike Tredgett	(Indonesia) Christian Hadinata (Indonesia) Imelda Wiguna	18–13, 15–10
1981	(England) Nora Perry (England) Mike Tredgett	(Indonesia) Christian Hadinata (Indonesia) Imelda Wiguna	10–15, 18–14, 15–10
1982	(England) Martin Dew (England) Gillian Gilks	(England) Karen Chapman (Scotland) Billy Gilliland	15–10, 14–17, 15–7
1983	(Sweden) Thomas Kihlström (England) Nora Perry	(Denmark) Anne Skovgaard (Denmark) Steen Skovgaard	18–16, 11–15, 15–6
1984	(England) Martin Dew (England) Gillian Gilks	(England) Gillian Gowers (England) Nigel Tier	15–8, 15–3
1985	(Scotland) Billy Gilliland (England) Nora Perry	(England) Gillian Clark (Sweden) Thomas Kihlström	15–10, 15–12
1986	(South Korea) Chung Myung-hee (South Korea) Park Joo-bong	(South Korea) Chung So-young (South Korea) Lee Deuk-choon	15–5, 15–5
1987	(South Korea) Chung Myung-hee (South Korea) Lee Deuk-choon	(Sweden) Jan-Eric Antonsson (Sweden) Christine Magnusson	15–5, 14–18, 15–8
1988	(China) Shi Fangjing (China) Wang Pengren	(Denmark) Jesper Knudsen (Denmark) Nettie Nielsen	15–9, 18–13
1989	(South Korea) Chung Myung-hee (South Korea) Park Joo-bong	(Sweden) Jan-Eric Antonsson (Sweden) Maria Bengtsson	15–1, 15–9
1990	(South Korea) Chung Myung-hee (South Korea) Park Joo-bong	(Denmark) Jon Holst-Christensen (Denmark) Grete Mogensen	15–6, 15–3
1991	(South Korea) Chung Myung-hee (South Korea) Park Joo-bong	(Denmark) Pernille Dupont (Denmark) Thomas Lund	15–10, 10–15, 15–4
1992	(Denmark) Pernille Dupont (Denmark) Thomas Lund	(Denmark) Jon Holst-Christensen (Denmark) Grete Mogensen	15–10, 15–1
1993	(Denmark) Jon Holst-Christensen (Denmark) Grete Mogensen	(Sweden) Catrine Bengtsson (Denmark) Thomas Lund	8–1 (retired)
1994	(England) Nick Ponting (England) Joanne Wright	(England) Gillian Clark (England) Chris Hunt	15–10, 15–11
1995	(Denmark) Thomas Lund (Denmark) Marlene Thomsen	(Denmark) Jon Holst-Christensen (Denmark) Rikke Olsen	15–7, 15–7
1996	(South Korea) Park Joo-bong (South Korea) Ra Kyung-min	(England) Simon Archer (England) Julie Bradbury	15–10, 15–10
1997	(China) Ge Fei (China) Liu Yong	(Indonesia) Trikus Heryanto (Indonesia) Minarti Timur	15–10, 15–2
1998	(South Korea) Kim Dong-moon (South Korea) Ra Kyung-min	(Denmark) Rikke Olsen (Denmark) Michael Søgaard	15–2, 11–15, 15–5
1999	(England) Simon Archer (England) Joanne Goode	(South Korea) Chung Jae-hee (South Korea) Ha Tae-kwon	15–2, 15–13
2000	(South Korea) Kim Dong-moon (South Korea) Ra Kyung-min	(China) Ge Fei (China) Liu Yong	15–10, 15–2
2001	(China) Gao Ling (China) Zhang Jun	(Denmark) Rikke Olsen (Denmark) Michael Søgaard	13–15, 15–12, 17–14
2002	(South Korea) Kim Dong-moon (South Korea) Ra Kyung-min	(Denmark) Jens Eriksen (Denmark) Mette Schjoldager	7–3, 7–3, 7–0
2003	(China) Gao Ling (China) Zhang Jun	(China) Chen Qiqiu (China) Zhao Tingting	11–6, 11–7
2004	(South Korea) Kim Dong-moon (South Korea) Ra Kyung-min	(South Korea) Kim Yong-hyun (South Korea) Lee Hyo-jung	15–8, 17–15
2005	(England) Gail Emms (England) Nathan Robertson	(Denmark) Thomas Laybourn (Denmark) Kamilla Rytter Juhl	15–10, 15–12
2006	(China) Gao Ling (China) Zhang Jun	(England) Gail Emms (England) Nathan Robertson	12–15, 17–14, 15–1
2007	(China) Gao Ling (China) Zheng Bo	(England) Anthony Clark (England) Donna Kellogg	16–21, 21–18, 21–14
2008	(China) Gao Ling (China) Zheng Bo	(Indonesia) Liliyana Natsir (Indonesia) Nova Widianto	18–21, 21–14, 21–9
2009	(China) He Hanbin (China) Yu Yang	(South Korea) Ha Jung-eun (South Korea) Ko Sung-hyun	13–21, 21–15, 21–9
2010	(China) Zhang Nan (China) Zhao Yunlei	(Indonesia) Liliyana Natsir (Indonesia) Nova Widianto	21–18, 23–25, 21–18
2011	(China) Xu Chen (China) Ma Jin	(Thailand) Sudket Prapakamol (Thailand) Saralee Thungthongkam	21–13, 21–9
2012	(Indonesia) Tontowi Ahmad (Indonesia) Liliyana Natsir	(Denmark) Thomas Laybourn (Denmark) Kamilla Rytter Juhl	21–17, 21–19
2013	(Indonesia) Tontowi Ahmad (Indonesia) Liliyana Natsir	(China) Zhang Nan (China) Zhao Yunlei	21–13, 21–17
2014	(Indonesia) Tontowi Ahmad (Indonesia) Liliyana Natsir	(China) Zhang Nan (China) Zhao Yunlei	21–13, 21–17
2015	(China) Zhang Nan (China) Zhao Yunlei	(Indonesia) Tontowi Ahmad (Indonesia) Liliyana Natsir	21–10, 21–10
2016	(Indonesia) Praveen Jordan (Indonesia) Debby Susanto	(Denmark) Joachim Fischer Nielsen (Denmark) Christinna Pedersen	21–12, 21–17
2017	(China) Huang Yaqiong (China) Lu Kai	(Malaysia) Chan Peng Soon (Malaysia) Goh Liu Ying	18–21, 21–19, 21–16
2018	(Japan) Arisa Higashino (Japan) Yuta Watanabe	(China) Huang Yaqiong (China) Zheng Siwei	15–21, 22–20, 21–16
2019	(China) Huang Yaqiong (China) Zheng Siwei	(Japan) Arisa Higashino (Japan) Yuta Watanabe	21–17, 22–20
2020	(Indonesia) Praveen Jordan (Indonesia) Melati Daeva Oktavianti	(Thailand) Dechapol Puavaranukroh (Thailand) Sapsiree Taerattanachai	21–15, 17–21, 21–8
2021	(Japan) Arisa Higashino (Japan) Yuta Watanabe	(Japan) Yuki Kaneko (Japan) Misaki Matsutomo	21–14, 21–13
2022	(Japan) Arisa Higashino (Japan) Yuta Watanabe	(China) Huang Dongping (China) Wang Yilyu	21–19, 21–19
2023	(China) Huang Yaqiong (China) Zheng Siwei	(South Korea) Chae Yoo-jung (South Korea) Seo Seung-jae	21–16, 16–21, 21–12
2024	(China) Huang Yaqiong (China) Zheng Siwei	(Japan) Arisa Higashino (Japan) Yuta Watanabe	21–16, 21–11
2025	(China) Chen Fanghui (China) Guo Xinwa	(China) Wei Yaxin (China) Feng Yanzhe	21-16, 10-21, 23-21

== Statistics ==
=== Multiple titles ===
Bold indicates active players.

Rank	Country	Player	Amateur era	Open era	All-time	Years
1	ENG	George Alan Thomas	8	0	8	1903, 1906, 1907, 1911, 1914, 1920, 1921, 1922
1	ENG	Betty Uber	8	0	8	1930, 1931, 1932, 1933, 1934, 1935, 1936, 1938
1	DEN	Finn Kobberø	8	0	8	1955, 1957, 1960, 1961, 1962, 1963, 1965, 1966
4	DEN	Ulla Rasmussen	7	0	7	1962, 1963, 1965, 1966, 1967, 1971, 1972
5	ENG	Hazel Hogarth	6	0	6	1905, 1912, 1914, 1920, 1921, 1922
5	ENG	Gillian Perrin	4	2	6	1969, 1973, 1976, 1977, 1982, 1984
5	ENG	Nora Gardner	2	4	6	1975, 1978, 1980, 1981, 1983, 1985
8	IRL	Frank Devlin	5	0	5	1924, 1925, 1926, 1927, 1929
8	DEN	Kirsten Thorndahl	5	0	5	1948, 1955, 1957, 1960, 1961
8	KOR	Myung-hee Chung	0	5	5	1986, 1987, 1989, 1990, 1991
8	KOR	Joo-bong Park	0	5	5	1986, 1989, 1990, 1991, 1996
8	KOR	Kyung-min Ra	0	5	5	1996, 1998, 2000, 2002, 2004
8	CHN	Ling Gao	0	5	5	2001, 2003, 2006, 2007, 2008
14	ENG	Donald C. Hume	4	0	4	1933, 1934, 1935, 1936
14	DEN	Poul Holm	4	0	4	1947, 1950, 1951, 1952
14	DEN	Tonny Olsen	4	0	4	1947, 1950, 1951, 1952
14	ENG	Tony Jordan	4	0	4	1956, 1958, 1964, 1968
14	KOR	Dong-moon Kim	0	4	4	1998, 2000, 2002, 2004
14	CHN	Yaqiong Huang	0	4	4	2017, 2019, 2023, 2024
20	ENG	Margaret Larminie	3	0	3	1911, 1923, 1928
20	ENG	Herbert Uber	3	0	3	1930, 1931, 1932
20	ENG	June White	3	0	3	1953, 1956, 1958
20	DEN	Svend Pri	3	0	3	1967, 1971, 1972
20	ENG	Derek Talbot	3	0	3	1973, 1976, 1977
20	ENG	Mike Tredgett	1	2	3	1978, 1980, 1981
20	CHN	Jun Zhang	0	3	3	2001, 2003, 2006
20	INA	Tontowi Ahmad	0	3	3	2012, 2013, 2014
20	INA	Liliyana Natsir	0	3	3	2012, 2013, 2014
20	JPN	**Arisa Higashino**	0	3	3	2018, 2021, 2022
20	JPN	**Yuta Watanabe**	0	3	3	2018, 2021, 2022
20	CHN	Siwei Zheng	0	3	3	2019, 2023, 2024
33	ENG	D. Oakes	0	2	2	1899, 1900
33	ENG	Daisy St. John	2	0	2	1899, 1900
33	ENG	Ethel Warneford Thomson	2	0	2	1903, 1906
33	ENG	Henry Norman Marrett	2	0	2	1904, 1905
33	ENG	Guy A. Sautter	2	0	2	1910, 1913
33	ENG	Kitty McKane	2	0	2	1924, 1925
33	ENG	Eveline G. Peterson	2	0	2	1926, 1927
33	ENG	Susan Pound	2	0	2	1968, 1974
33	ENG	Martin Dew	0	2	2	1982, 1984
33	DEN	Thomas Lund	0	2	2	1992, 1995
33	ENG	Joanne Wright	0	2	2	1994, 1999
33	CHN	Bo Zheng	0	2	2	2007, 2008
33	CHN	Nan Zhang	0	2	2	2010, 2015
33	CHN	Yunlei Zhao	0	2	2	2010, 2015
33	INA	Praveen Jordan	0	2	2	2016, 2020

=== Champions by country ===
Rank	Country	Amateur era	Open era	All-time	First title	Last title	First champions	Last champions
1	England (ENG)	45	8	53	1899	2005	D. Oakes; Daisy St. John	Gail Emms; Nathan Robertson
2	Denmark (DEN)	18	3	21	1947	1995	Poul Holm; Tonny Olsen	Thomas Lund; Marlene Thomsen
3	China (CHN)	0	16	16	1988	2025	Fangjing Shi; Pengren Wang	Chen Fanghui; Guo Xinwa
4	South Korea (KOR)	0	10	10	1986	2004	Myung-hee Chung; Joo-bong Park	Dong-moon Kim; Kyung-min Ra
5	Indonesia (INA)	1	5	6	1979	2020	Christian Hadinata; Imelda Wiguna	Praveen Jordan; Melati Daeva Oktavianti
6	Ireland (IRL)	3.5	0	3.5	1923	1937	Gordon Mack (England) Margaret Larminie	Ian Maconachie (England) Thelma Kingsbury
7	Japan (JPN)	0	3	3	2018	2022	Arisa Higashino; Yuta Watanabe	
8	United States (USA)	1	0	1	1949	1949	Clinton Stephens; Patsey Stephens	
9	Malaysia (MAS)	0.5	0	0.5	1953	1953	David Ewe Leong Choong (England) June White	
9	Scotland (SCO)	0	0.5	0.5	1983	1983	Billy Gilliland (England) Nora Gardner	
9	Sweden (SWE)	0	0.5	0.5	1985	1985	Thomas Kihlström (England) Nora Gardner	

=== Multiple finalists ===
Rank	Country	Player	Amateur era	Open era	All-time
1	ENG	George Alan Thomas	14	0	14
2	ENG	Hazel Hogarth	12	0	12
3	DEN	Finn Kobberø	11	0	11
4	ENG	Nora Gardner	6	4	10
5	ENG	Betty Uber	9	0	9
5	ENG	Gillian Perrin	7	2	9
7	DEN	Kirsten Thorndahl	8	0	8
7	ENG	Tony Jordan	8	0	8
7	DEN	Ulla Rasmussen	8	0	8
10	IRL	Frank Devlin	7	0	7
11	ENG	June White	6	0	6
11	ENG	Derek Talbot	6	0	6
11	ENG	Mike Tredgett	4	2	6
11	INA	Liliyana Natsir	0	6	6
15	ENG	Meriel Lucas	5	0	5
15	DEN	Poul Holm	5	0	5
15	KOR	Myung-hee Chung	0	5	5
15	KOR	Joo-bong Park	0	5	5
15	KOR	Kyung-min Ra	0	5	5
15	CHN	Ling Gao	0	5	5
15	JPN	**Arisa Higashino**	0	5	5
15	JPN	**Yuta Watanabe**	0	5	5
15	CHN	Yaqiong Huang	0	5	5
24	ENG	Ethel Warneford Thomson	4	0	4
24	ENG	Margaret Larminie	4	0	4
24	ENG	Marian Horsley	4	0	4
24	ENG	Herbert Uber	4	0	4
24	ENG	Donald C. Hume	4	0	4
24	DEN	Tonny Olsen	4	0	4
24	DEN	Inge Birgit Hansen	4	0	4
24	DEN	Jon Holst-Christensen	0	4	4
24	DEN	Thomas Lund	0	4	4
24	KOR	Dong-moon Kim	0	4	4
24	CHN	Nan Zhang	0	4	4
24	CHN	Yunlei Zhao	0	4	4
24	INA	Tontowi Ahmad	0	4	4
24	CHN	Siwei Zheng	0	4	4
38	ENG	Henry Norman Marrett	3	0	3
38	ENG	Albert Davis Prebble	3	0	3
38	ENG	G. L. Murray	3	0	3
38	ENG	Penelope Dora Harvey Boothby	3	0	3
38	ENG	Frank Chesterton	3	0	3
38	ENG	Guy A. Sautter	3	0	3
38	ENG	Kitty McKane	3	0	3
38	ENG	Raymond M. White	3	0	3
38	IRL	Ian Maconachie	3	0	3
38	ENG	Ralph C. F. Nichols	3	0	3
38	DEN	Jørgen Hammergaard Hansen	3	0	3
38	DEN	Poul Erik Nielsen	3	0	3
38	DEN	Per Walsøe	3	0	3
38	DEN	Pernille Mølgaard Hansen	3	0	3
38	DEN	Svend Pri	3	0	3
38	ENG	Susan Pound	3	0	3
38	INA	Christian Hadinata	1	2	3
38	INA	Imelda Wiguna	1	2	3
38	DEN	Grete Mogensen	0	3	3
38	DEN	Rikke Olsen	0	3	3
38	CHN	Jun Zhang	0	3	3
59	ENG	D. Oakes	2	0	2
59	ENG	Daisy St. John	2	0	2
59	ENG	Herbert Mellersh	2	0	2
59	ENG	Stewart Marsden Massey	2	0	2
59	ENG	Cammell	2	0	2
59	ENG	Norman Wood	2	0	2
59	ENG	Edward Hawthorn	2	0	2
59	IRL	Gordon Mack	2	0	2
59	ENG	Eveline G. Peterson	2	0	2
59	ENG	Thelma Kingsbury	2	0	2
59	ENG	Bessie Staples	2	0	2
59	DEN	Jørn Skaarup	2	0	2
59	DEN	Aase Svendsen	2	0	2
59	MAS	David Ewe Leong Choong	2	0	2
59	DEN	Anni Jørgensen	2	0	2
59	ENG	Jenny Pritchard	2	0	2
59	ENG	Elliott C. Stuart	2	0	2
59	DEN	Steen Skovgaard	1	1	2
59	ENG	Martin Dew	0	2	2
59	SCO	Billy Gilliland	0	2	2
59	SWE	Thomas Kihlström	0	2	2
59	ENG	Gillian Clark	0	2	2
59	KOR	Deuk-choon Lee	0	2	2
59	SWE	Jan-Eric Antonsson	0	2	2
59	DEN	Pernille Dupont	0	2	2
59	ENG	Joanne Wright	0	2	2
59	ENG	Simon Archer	0	2	2
59	CHN	Fei Ge	0	2	2
59	CHN	Yong Liu	0	2	2
59	DEN	Michael Søgaard	0	2	2
59	ENG	Gail Emms	0	2	2
59	ENG	Nathan Robertson	0	2	2
59	DEN	Thomas Laybourn	0	2	2
59	DEN	Kamilla Rytter Juhl	0	2	2
59	INA	Nova Widianto	0	2	2
59	INA	Praveen Jordan	0	2	2

== Notes ==
Many female badminton players change their surname after marriage. Below are some of the former names or latest names as noted in the table above:

^1 – Margaret Tragett formerly known as Margaret Larminie
^2 – Tonny Ahm formerly known as Tonny Olsen
^3 – Ulla Strand formerly known as Ulla Rasmussen
^4 – Gillian Gilks formerly known as Gillian Perrin and later known as Gillian Goodwin

== See also ==
- List of All England men's singles champions
- List of All England women's singles champions
- List of All England men's doubles champions
- List of All England women's doubles champions
