= List of All England men's singles champions =

All England Open Badminton Championships Gentlemen’s Singles Champions
- Location: Birmingham; United Kingdom
- Venue: Utilita Arena Birmingham
- Governing body: NEC Group
- Created: 1900
- Editions: Total: 114; Open era (since 1980): 45
- Prize money: $101,500 (2025)
- Trophy: Gentleman's Singles Trophy
- Website: allenglandbadminton.com

Most titles
- Amateur era: 8: Rudy Hartono
- Open era: 6: Lin Dan

Most consecutive titles
- Amateur era: 7: Rudy Hartono
- Open era: 2: Morten Frost; 2: Hariyanto Arbi; 2: Poul-Erik Høyer Larsen; 2: Lin Dan; 2: Lee Chong Wei

Current champion
- Lin Chun-yi – 2026 (1st title)

The All England Open Badminton Championships is an annual British badminton tournament created in 1899. For four decades beginning 1954, the Championships was held at the Wembley Arena, London but since 1994, it has been played at the Arena Birmingham in the city of Birmingham, United Kingdom. The Gentlemen's Singles was first contested in 1900. Below is the list of the winners at the All England Open Badminton Championships in gentlemen's singles. The tournament was cancelled between 1915–1919 because of World War I, and between 1940–1946 because of World War II.

== History ==
In the Amateur era, Rudy Hartono (1968–1974, 1976) holds the record for the most titles in the Gentlemen's Singles, winning All England eight times. Hartono also holds the record for most consecutive titles with seven from 1968 to 1974.

Since the Open era of badminton began in late 1979 with the inclusion of professional badminton players from around the world in 1980, Lin Dan (2004, 2006–2007, 2009, 2012, 2016) holds the record for the most Gentlemen's Singles titles with six. Morten Frost (1986–1987), Hariyanto Arbi (1993–1994), Poul-Erik Høyer Larsen (1995–1996), Lin Dan and Lee Chong Wei (2010–2011) share the record for most consecutive victories with just two.

This event was won without losing a single game in the entire tournament during the Open era as many as twelve times. The first to accomplish this was Prakash Padukone who won in the very first Open era edition in 1980, followed by Morten Frost in 1986 and 1987, Yang Yang in 1989, Poul-Erik Høyer Larsen in 1996, Sun Jun in 1998, Pullela Gopichand in 2001, Muhammad Hafiz Hashim in 2003, Chen Jin in 2008, Lin Dan in 2009 and 2012 and Lee Chong Wei in 2011.

Liem Swie King is the only player in history to reach the All England Open Badminton Gentlemen's Singles Final in both Amateur and Open era. He managed to do so seven times, winning on three occasions.

== Finalists ==
=== Amateur era ===
Year	Country	Champions	Country	Runners–up	Score
1900	ENG	Sydney Howard Smith	ENG	D. W. Oakes	15–12, 11–15, 15–10
1901	ENG	H. W. Davies	ENG	Ralph George Watling	15–9, 15–4
1902	ENG	Ralph George Watling	ENG	E. Young	15–5, 15–7
1903	ENG	Ralph George Watling	ENG	Henry Norman Marrett	1–15, 18–17, 15–8
1904	ENG	Henry Norman Marrett	ENG	George Alan Thomas	15–8, 15–10
1905	ENG	Henry Norman Marrett	ENG	Ralph George Watling	15–6, 15–2
1906	ENG	Norman Wood	ENG	Henry Norman Marrett	15–8, 18–13
1907	ENG	Norman Wood	ENG	Frank Chesterton	15–6, 15–7
1908	ENG	Henry Norman Marrett	IRE	Arthur Cave	12–15, 18–14, 15–9
1909	ENG	Frank Chesterton	ENG	Henry Norman Marrett	15–8, 8–15, 15–10
1910	ENG	Frank Chesterton	ENG	Henry Norman Marrett	15–4, 15–10
1911	ENG	Guy A. Sautter	ENG	J. H. Colin Prior	15–6, 15–11
1912	ENG	Frank Chesterton	ENG	Guy A. Sautter	15–10, 15–13
1913	ENG	U. N. Lapin (Guy A. Sautter)	ENG	Frank Chesterton	15–7, 15–8
1914	ENG	U. N. Lapin (Guy A. Sautter)	ENG	Frank Chesterton	15–4, 15–10
1915–1919	No competition				
1920	ENG	George Allen (George Alan Thomas)	ENG	William Mather Swinden	15–9, 14–17, 15–5
1921	ENG	George Alan Thomas	ENG	Frank Hodge	15–7, 8–15, 15–3
1922	ENG	George Alan Thomas	ENG	Frank Hodge	15–14, 15–5
1923	ENG	George Alan Thomas	ENG	Herbert Uber	15–10, 15–10
1924	IRL	Gordon Sylvester Bradshaw Mack	ENG	George Alan Thomas	17–15, 9–15, 15–6
1925	IRL	Joseph Francis Devlin	ENG	Frank Hodge	11–15, 15–7, 18–15
1926	IRL	Joseph Francis Devlin	ENG	Albert Edward Harbot	7–15, 15–5, 15–6
1927	IRL	Joseph Francis Devlin	ENG	Albert Edward Harbot	15–3, 15–7
1928	IRL	Joseph Francis Devlin	ENG	Albert Edward Harbot	15–10, 15–6
1929	IRL	Joseph Francis Devlin	ENG	Donald Charles Hume	15–4, 15–1
1930	ENG	Donald Charles Hume	ENG	Alan Titherley	15–12, 15–12
1931	IRL	Joseph Francis Devlin	ENG	Thomas Pattinson Dick	3–15, 15–10, 15–3
1932	ENG	Ralph Cyril Fulford Nichols	ENG	Raymond Maurice White	5–15, 15–11, 18–16
1933	ENG	Raymond Maurice White	ENG	Donald Charles Hume	
1934	ENG	Ralph Cyril Fulford Nichols	ENG	Thomas Pattinson Dick	15–11, 15–8
1935	ENG	Raymond Maurice White	ENG	Ralph Cyril Fulford Nichols	15–10, 15–7
1936	ENG	Ralph Cyril Fulford Nichols	ENG	Raymond Maurice White	18–16, 17–18, 15–10
1937	ENG	Ralph Cyril Fulford Nichols	ENG	Thomas Pattinson Dick	15–8, 15–7
1938	ENG	Ralph Cyril Fulford Nichols	DEN	Jesper Bie	15–4, 15–5
1939	DEN	Tage Madsen	ENG	Ralph Cyril Fulford Nichols	10–15, 18–13, 15–7
1940–1946	No competition				
1947	SWE	Conny Jepsen	IND	Prakash Nath	15–7, 15–11
1948	DEN	Jørn Skaarup	DEN	Poul Holm	15–3, 15–13
1949	USA	David Guthrie Freeman	MAS	Teik Hock Ooi	15–1, 15–6
1950	MAS	Peng Soon Wong	DEN	Poul Holm	15–7, 15–10
1951	MAS	Peng Soon Wong	MAS	Poh Lim Ong	15–18, 18–14, 15–7
1952	MAS	Peng Soon Wong	MAS	Eddy Ewe Beng Choong	15–11, 18–13
1953	MAS	Eddy Ewe Beng Choong	MAS	Hock Aun Heah	15–4, 15–4
1954	MAS	Eddy Ewe Beng Choong	CAN	Donald Smythe	15–5, 15–6
1955	MAS	Peng Soon Wong	MAS	Eddy Ewe Beng Choong	15–7, 14–17, 15–10
1956	MAS	Eddy Ewe Beng Choong	DEN	Finn Kobberø	11–15, 15–3, 15–11
1957	MAS	Eddy Ewe Beng Choong	DEN	Erland Kops	15–9, 15–3
1958	DEN	Erland Kops	DEN	Finn Kobberø	15–10, 8–15, 15–8
1959	INA	Joe Hok Tan	INA	Ferdinand Alexander Sonneville	15–8, 10–15, 15–3
1960	DEN	Erland Kops	THA	Charoen Wattanasin	15–11, 11–15, 15–6
1961	DEN	Erland Kops	DEN	Finn Kobberø	15–10, 15–6
1962	DEN	Erland Kops	THA	Charoen Wattanasin	15–10, 15–5
1963	DEN	Erland Kops	THA	Channarong Ratanaseangsuang	15–7, 15–7
1964	DEN	Knud Aage Nielsen	DEN	Henning Borch	8–15, 17–14, 15–4
1965	DEN	Erland Kops	MAS	Aik Huang Tan	15–13, 15–12
1966	MAS	Aik Huang Tan	JPN	Masao Akiyama	15–7, 15–4
1967	DEN	Erland Kops	MAS	Aik Huang Tan	15–12, 15–10
1968	INA	Rudy Hartono	MAS	Aik Huang Tan	15–12, 15–9
1969	INA	Rudy Hartono	INA	Pek Sen Wong	15–1, 15–3
1970	INA	Rudy Hartono	DEN	Svend Pri	15–7, 15–1
1971	INA	Rudy Hartono	INA	Tjin Siang Ang	15–1, 15–5
1972	INA	Rudy Hartono	DEN	Svend Pri	15–9, 15–4
1973	INA	Rudy Hartono	INA	Christian Hadinata	15–4, 15–2
1974	INA	Rudy Hartono	MAS	Punch Gunalan	8–15, 15–9, 15–10
1975	DEN	Svend Pri	INA	Rudy Hartono	15–11, 17–14
1976	INA	Rudy Hartono	INA	Swie King Liem	15–7, 15–6
1977	DEN	Flemming Delfs	INA	Swie King Liem	15–18, 15–11, 15–8
1978	INA	Swie King Liem	INA	Rudy Hartono	15–10, 15–3
1979	INA	Swie King Liem	DEN	Flemming Delfs	15–7, 15–8

=== Open era ===
Year	Country	Champions	Country	Runners–up	Score
1980	IND	Prakash Padukone	INA	Liem Swie King	15–3, 15–10
1981	INA	Liem Swie King	IND	Prakash Padukone	11–15, 15–4, 15–6
1982	DEN	Morten Frost	CHN	Luan Jin	11–15, 15–2, 15–7
1983	CHN	Luan Jin	DEN	Morten Frost	15–2, 13–15, 15–4
1984	DEN	Morten Frost	INA	Liem Swie King	9–15, 15–10, 15–10
1985	CHN	Zhao Jianhua	DEN	Morten Frost	6–15, 15–10, 18–15
1986	DEN	Morten Frost	MAS	Misbun Sidek	15–2, 15–8
1987	DEN	Morten Frost	INA	Icuk Sugiarto	15–10, 15–0
1988	DEN	Ib Frederiksen	DEN	Morten Frost	8–15, 15–7, 15–10
1989	CHN	Yang Yang	DEN	Morten Frost	15–6, 15–7
1990	CHN	Zhao Jianhua	INA	Joko Suprianto	15–4, 15–1
1991	INA	Ardy Bernardus Wiranata	MAS	Foo Kok Keong	15–12, 15–10
1992	CHN	Liu Jun	CHN	Zhao Jianhua	15–13, 15–13
1993	INA	Hariyanto Arbi	INA	Joko Suprianto	15–7, 4–15, 15–11
1994	INA	Hariyanto Arbi	INA	Ardy Bernardus Wiranata	15–12, 17–14
1995	DEN	Poul-Erik Høyer Larsen	INA	Hariyanto Arbi	17–16, 15–6
1996	DEN	Poul-Erik Høyer Larsen	MAS	Rashid Sidek	15–7, 15–6
1997	CHN	Dong Jiong	CHN	Sun Jun	15–9, 15–5
1998	CHN	Sun Jun	MAS	Ong Ewe Hock	15–1, 15–7
1999	DEN	Peter Gade	INA	Taufik Hidayat	15–11, 7–15, 15–10
2000	CHN	Xia Xuanze	INA	Taufik Hidayat	15–6, 15–13
2001	IND	Pullela Gopichand	CHN	Chen Hong	15–12, 15–6
2002	CHN	Chen Hong	INA	Budi Santoso	7–4, 7–5, 7–1
2003	MAS	Muhammad Hafiz Hashim	CHN	Chen Hong	17–14, 15–10
2004	CHN	Lin Dan	DEN	Peter Gade	9–15, 15–5, 15–8
2005	CHN	Chen Hong	CHN	Lin Dan	8–15, 15–5, 15–2
2006	CHN	Lin Dan	KOR	Lee Hyun-il	15–7, 15–7
2007	CHN	Lin Dan	CHN	Chen Yu	21–13, 21–12
2008	CHN	Chen Jin	CHN	Lin Dan	22–20, 25–23
2009	CHN	Lin Dan	MAS	Lee Chong Wei	21–19, 21–12
2010	MAS	Lee Chong Wei	JPN	Kenichi Tago	21–19, 21–19
2011	MAS	Lee Chong Wei	CHN	Lin Dan	21–17, 21–17
2012	CHN	Lin Dan	MAS	Lee Chong Wei	21–19, 6–2^{r}
2013	CHN	Chen Long	MAS	Lee Chong Wei	21–17, 21–18
2014	MAS	Lee Chong Wei	CHN	Chen Long	21–13, 21–18
2015	CHN	Chen Long	DEN	Jan Østergaard Jørgensen	15–21, 21–17, 21–15
2016	CHN	Lin Dan	CHN	Tian Houwei	21–9, 21–10
2017	MAS	Lee Chong Wei	CHN	Shi Yuqi	21–12, 21–10
2018	CHN	Shi Yuqi	CHN	Lin Dan	21–19, 16–21, 21–9
2019	JPN	Kento Momota	DEN	Viktor Axelsen	21–11, 15–21, 21–15
2020	DEN	Viktor Axelsen	TPE	Chou Tien-chen	21–13, 21–14
2021	MAS	Lee Zii Jia	DEN	Viktor Axelsen	30–29, 20–22, 21–9
2022	DEN	Viktor Axelsen	IND	Lakshya Sen	21–10, 21–15
2023	CHN	Li Shifeng	CHN	Shi Yuqi	26–24, 21–5
2024	INA	Jonatan Christie	INA	Anthony Sinisuka Ginting	21–15, 21–14
2025	CHN	Shi Yuqi	TPE	Lee Chia-hao	21–17, 21–19
2026	TPE	Lin Chun-yi	IND	Lakshya Sen	21–15, 22–20

== Statistics ==
=== Multiple titles ===
Bold indicates active players.

Rank	Country	Player	Amateur era	Open era	All-time	Years
1	INA	Rudy Hartono	8	0	8	1968, 1969, 1970, 1971, 1972, 1973, 1974, 1976
2	DEN	Erland Kops	7	0	7	1958, 1960, 1961, 1962, 1963, 1965, 1967
3	IRL	Joseph Francis Devlin	6	0	6	1925, 1926, 1927, 1928, 1929, 1931
3	CHN	Dan Lin	0	6	6	2004, 2006, 2007, 2009, 2012, 2016
5	ENG	Ralph Cyril Fulford Nichols	5	0	5	1932, 1934, 1936, 1937, 1938
6	ENG	George Alan Thomas	4	0	4	1920, 1921, 1922, 1923
6	MAS	Peng Soon Wong	4	0	4	1950, 1951, 1952, 1955
6	MAS	Eddy Ewe Beng Choong	4	0	4	1953, 1954, 1956, 1957
6	DEN	Morten Frost	0	4	4	1982, 1984, 1986, 1987
6	MAS	Chong Wei Lee	0	4	4	2010, 2011, 2014, 2017
11	ENG	Henry Norman Marrett	3	0	3	1904, 1905, 1908
11	ENG	Frank Chesterton	3	0	3	1909, 1910, 1912
11	ENG	Guy A. Sautter	3	0	3	1911, 1913, 1914
11	INA	Swie King Liem	2	1	3	1978, 1979, 1981
15	ENG	Ralph Watling	2	0	2	1902, 1903
15	ENG	Norman Wood	2	0	2	1906, 1907
15	ENG	Raymond Maurice White	2	0	2	1933, 1935
15	CHN	Jianhua Zhao	0	2	2	1985, 1990
15	INA	Hariyanto Arbi	0	2	2	1993, 1994
15	DEN	Poul-Erik Høyer Larsen	0	2	2	1995, 1996
15	CHN	Hong Chen	0	2	2	2002, 2005
15	CHN	Long Chen	0	2	2	2013, 2015
15	DEN	Viktor Axelsen	0	2	2	2020, 2022
15	CHN	**Yuqi Shi**	0	2	2	2018, 2025

=== Champions by country ===
Rank	Country	Amateur era	Open era	All-time	First title	Last title	First champion	Last champion
1	England (ENG)	27	0	27	1900	1938	Sydney Howard Smith	Ralph Cyril Fulford Nichols
2	Denmark (DEN)	12	10	22	1939	2022	Tage Madsen	Viktor Axelsen
2	China (CHN)	0	22	22	1983	2025	Jin Luan	Yuqi Shi
4	Indonesia (INA)	11	5	16	1959	2024	Joe Hok Tan	Jonatan Christie
5	Malaysia (MAS)	9	6	15	1950	2021	Peng Soon Wong	Zii Jia Lee
6	Ireland (IRL)	7	0	7	1924	1931	Gordon Sylvester Bradshaw Mack	Joseph Francis Devlin
7	India (IND)	0	2	2	1980	2001	Prakash Padukone	Pullela Gopichand
8	Sweden (SWE)	1	0	1	1947		Conny Jepsen	
8	United States (USA)	1	0	1	1949		David Guthrie Freeman	
8	Japan (JPN)	0	1	1	2019		Kento Momota	
8	Chinese Taipei (TPE)	0	1	1	2026		Lin Chun-yi	

=== Multiple finalists ===
Bold indicates active players.
Italic indicates players who never won the championship.

Rank	Country	Player	Amateur era	Open era	All-time
1	INA	Rudy Hartono	10	0	10
1	CHN	Dan Lin	0	10	10
3	DEN	Erland Kops	8	0	8
3	DEN	Morten Frost	0	8	8
5	ENG	Henry Norman Marrett	7	0	7
5	ENG	Ralph Cyril Fulford Nichols	7	0	7
5	INA	Swie King Liem	4	3	7
5	MAS	Chong Wei Lee	0	7	7
9	ENG	George Alan Thomas	6	0	6
9	ENG	Frank Chesterton	6	0	6
9	IRL	Joseph Francis Devlin	6	0	6
9	MAS	Eddy Ewe Beng Choong	6	0	6
13	ENG	Ralph Watling	4	0	4
13	ENG	Guy A. Sautter	4	0	4
13	ENG	Raymond Maurice White	4	0	4
13	MAS	Peng Soon Wong	4	0	4
13	MAS	Aik Huang Tan	4	0	4
13	CHN	Hong Chen	0	4	4
13	DEN	**Viktor Axelsen**	0	4	4
13	CHN	**Yuqi Shi**	0	4	4
20	ENG	Frank Hodge	3	0	3
20	ENG	Albert Edward Harbot	3	0	3
20	ENG	Thomas Pattinson Dick	3	0	3
20	ENG	Donald Charles Hume	3	0	3
20	DEN	Finn Kobberø	3	0	3
20	DEN	Svend Pri	3	0	3
20	CHN	Jianhua Zhao	0	3	3
20	INA	Hariyanto Arbi	0	3	3
20	CHN	Long Chen	0	3	3
30	ENG	Norman Wood	2	0	2
30	THA	Charoen Wattanasin	2	0	2
30	DEN	Flemming Delfs	2	0	2
30	IND	Prakash Padukone	0	2	2
30	CHN	Jin Luan	0	2	2
30	INA	Joko Suprianto	0	2	2
30	INA	Ardy Bernardus Wiranata	0	2	2
30	DEN	Poul-Erik Høyer Larsen	0	2	2
30	CHN	Jun Sun	0	2	2
30	DEN	Peter Gade	0	2	2
30	INA	Taufik Hidayat	0	2	2

== Trivia ==
- In 1913 & 1914 Guy A. Sautter competed under the alias of U. N. Lapin and in 1920 George Thomas played under the alias of George Allen.
- Only nine players have ever contested at least five finals back-to-back, with six of the records taking place back-to-back themselves. However, only the latter four of those players have done so in the Open Era. Those who have accomplished this rare feat include Frank Devlin, immediately after George Alan Thomas, followed by Morten Frost succeeding Liem Swie King more than half a century after, and finally more than two decades later, the legendary duo of Lin Dan and Lee Chong Wei going down the same path:

Bold indicates active players.

Rank	Country	Player	Back-to-back finals	Period
1	INA	Rudy Hartono	9	1968–1976
2	DEN	Morten Frost	8	1982–1989
3	ENG	Ralph Cyril Fulford Nichols	6	1934–1939
3	MAS	Eddy Ewe Beng Choong	6	1952–1957
3	INA	Swie King Liem	6	1976–1981
3	CHN	Dan Lin	6	2004–2009
3	MAS	Chong Wei Lee	6	2009–2014
8	ENG	George Alan Thomas	5	1920–1924
8	IRL	Joseph Francis Devlin	5	1925–1929
10	ENG	Henry Norman Marrett	4	1903–1906
10	ENG	Guy A. Sautter	4	1911–1914
10	DEN	Erland Kops	4	1960–1963
10	MAS	Aik Huang Tan	4	1965–1968
10	DEN	**Viktor Axelsen**	4	2019–2022
15	ENG	Ralph Watling	3	1901–1903
15	ENG	Henry Norman Marrett	3	1908–1910
15	ENG	Frank Chesterton	3	1912–1914
15	ENG	Albert Edward Harbot	3	1926–1928
15	MAS	Peng Soon Wong	3	1950–1952
15	INA	Hariyanto Arbi	3	1993–1995
15	CHN	Hong Chen	3	2001–2003
15	CHN	Long Chen	3	2013–2015

- The players who holds the record for most finals contested are Rudy Hartono and Lin Dan at 10.
- Between 2004 & 2018, either or both Lin Dan and Lee Chong Wei have contested the final of 14 of the 15 editions held, with the exception of the final in 2015, which saw Lin eliminated in the semi-finals and Lee unable to compete due to a doping ban.

== See also ==
- List of All England women's singles champions
- List of All England men's doubles champions
- List of All England women's doubles champions
- List of All England mixed doubles champions
