= 1931 All England Badminton Championships =

Tournament information
- Sport: Badminton
- Location: Royal Horticultural Hall, Westminster, England, United Kingdom
- Dates: March 3–March 8, 1931
- Established: 1899
- Website: All England Championships

The 1931 All England Championships was a badminton tournament held at the Royal Horticultural Hall, Westminster, England from March 3 to March 8 1931.

== Final results ==
Category	Winners	Runners-up	Score
Men's singles	(Republic of Ireland) Frank Devlin	(England) Thomas P. Dick	3–15, 15–10, 15–3
Women's singles	(England) Marjorie Barrett	(England) Leoni Kingsbury	11–8, 4–11, 14–9
Men's doubles	(Republic of Ireland) Frank Devlin & Curly Mack	(England) K G Livingstone & Raymond White	15–6, 11–15, 15–4
Women's doubles	(England) Betty Uber & Marian Horsley	(England) Violet Elton & Marjorie Barrett	12–15, 15–10, 15–5
Mixed doubles	(England) Herbert Uber & Betty Uber	(Republic of Ireland) Frank Devlin & (England) Marian Horsley	8–15, 15-8 15–9

=== Results ===
==== Men's singles ====
Second round
(Republic of Ireland) Frank Devlin	18	15
(England) M W Field	15	7
(England) K G Livingstone	15	18
(England) Sir George Thomas	10	15
(England) Donald Hume	15	18
(England) Raymond White	3	17
(Scotland) John William Alfred Bonar	15	15
(England) R Bracey-Forbes	12	9
(England) Thomas P. Dick	15	15
(England) Alan Titherley	2	7
(England) S Jackson	15	15
(South Africa) Gerald Sherwell	11	12
(Canada) Jack E Purcell	7	15	15
(England) Ralph Nichols	15	10	5
(Republic of Ireland) Arthur Hamilton	16	15	15
(Republic of Ireland) James Rankin	18	11	11

Quarterfinals
(Republic of Ireland) Devlin	15	15
(England) Livingstone	4	0
(England) Hume	15	15
(Scotland) Bonar	6	7
(England) Dick	15	15
(England) Jackson	9	9
(Canada) Purcell	15	15
(Republic of Ireland) Hamilton	12	7

Semifinals
(Republic of Ireland) Devlin	15	8	15
(England) Hume	6	15	11
(England) Dick	15	15
(Canada) Purcell	11	7

Final
(Republic of Ireland) Devlin	3	15	15
(England) Dick	15	10	3

==== Women's singles ====
Second round
(England) Marjorie Barrett	w/o
(England) W L Bonar
(England) Thelma Kingsbury	11	11
(England) Nora Coop	7	3
(England) Betty Uber	11	11
(England) J F Browse	0	1
(Wales) B Neville	11	11
(England) J M Dutton	1	0
(England) Leoni Kingsbury	11	11
(England) J C B Nias	5	1
(England) Margaret Tragett	13	11
(England) Marian Horsley	12	8
(England) Alice Woodroffe	11	11
(England) R L Barton	0	2
(England) J E Oswald	11	11
(England) T Webster	2	8

Quarterfinals
(England) Barrett	14	11
(England) Kingsbury T	9	7
(England) Uber	11	11
(Wales) Neville	8	4
(England) Kingsbury L	11	11
(England) Tragett	4	6
(England) Woodroffe	11	11
(England) Oswald	2	7

Semifinals
(England) Barrett	11	11
(England) Uber	5	1
(England) Kingsbury L	11	14
(England) Woodroffe	1	12

Final
(England) Barrett	11	4	14
(England) Kingsbury L	8	11	9
