= Scottish Open (badminton) =

Badminton tournament in Scotland

The Scottish Open in badminton is an open international championships held in Scotland since 1907 and is thereby one of the oldest badminton tournaments in the world. The tournament was halted during the two World Wars.

== Past winners ==
Year	Men's singles	Women's singles	Men's doubles	Women's doubles	Mixed doubles	Ref
1907	(England) George Alan Thomas	No competition	(England) George Alan Thomas (England) R. G. P. Hunter	(Scotland) F. A. Todd (Scotland) V. I. Todd	(England) George Alan Thomas (England) G. L. Murray	
1908	(England) Frank Chesterton	No competition	(England) Frank Chesterton (England) Hugh Comyn	(England) Meriel Lucas (England) G. L. Murray	(England) Frank Chesterton (England) Meriel Lucas	
1909	(England) George Alan Thomas	No competition	(England) George Alan Thomas (England) Hugh Comyn	(England) Meriel Lucas (England) G. L. Murray	(England) George Alan Thomas (England) G. L. Murray	
1910	(England) George Alan Thomas	No competition	(England) George Alan Thomas (England) Hugh Comyn	(England) Meriel Lucas (England) G. L. Murray	(England) George Alan Thomas (England) G. L. Murray	
1911	(England) George Alan Thomas	No competition	(England) Edward Hawthorn (England) Guy A. Sautter	(Scotland) V. I. Todd (Scotland) H. C. A. Longmuir	(England) George Alan Thomas (England) W. S. Gill	
1912	(England) George Alan Thomas	No competition	(England) George Alan Thomas (England) Stewart Marsden Massey	(Scotland) V. I. Todd (Scotland) H. C. A. Longmuir	(England) Guy Sautter (England) D. B. Drinkwater	
1913	(England) George Alan Thomas	(England) Lavinia Clara Radeglia	(Scotland) James Crombie (Scotland) H. J. H. Inglis	(England) Lavinia Clara Radeglia (England) W. S. Gill	(England) George Alan Thomas (England) Lavinia Clara Radeglia	
1914	(England) George Alan Thomas	(England) Lavinia Clara Radeglia	(England) George Alan Thomas (England) Frank Chesterton	(England) Lavinia Clara Radeglia (Scotland) K. M. Cochrane	(England) George Alan Thomas (England) Lavinia Clara Radeglia	
1915– 1920	No competition due to World War I					
1921	(England) George Alan Thomas	(England) Lavinia Clara Radeglia	(Republic of Ireland) R. A. J.Goff (Republic of Ireland) Frank Devlin	(Scotland) E. G. Petterson (Scotland) D. M. Aitken	(England) George Alan Thomas (England) Lavinia Clara Radeglia	
1922	(England) George Alan Thomas	No competition	(Republic of Ireland) R. A. J.Goff (Republic of Ireland) Frank Devlin	(Scotland) E. G. Petterson (Scotland) D. M. Aitken	(England) George Alan Thomas (England) Lavinia Clara Radeglia	
1923	(England) William Swinden	No competition	(England) George Alan Thomas (England) Herbert Uber	(England) Hazel Hogarth (England) Kitty McKane	(England) George Alan Thomas (England) Margaret Tragett	
1924	(Republic of Ireland) Gordon 'Curly' Mack	(England) Margaret Tragett	(Republic of Ireland) Gordon 'Curly' Mack (Republic of Ireland) R. A. J. Goff	(England) Margaret Tragett (England) E. F. Stewart	(England) George Alan Thomas (England) Margaret Tragett	
1925	(England) George Alan Thomas	(England) Margaret Tragett	(England) George Alan Thomas (England) Herbert Uber	(England) Margaret Tragett (England) E. F. Stewart	(England) Herbert Uber (England) Marian Horsley	
1926	(England) George Alan Thomas	(England) Margaret Tragett	(England) George Alan Thomas (England) Herbert Uber	(Scotland) Margaret Tragett (Scotland) C. T. Duncan	(England) George Alan Thomas (England) Margaret Tragett	
1927	(England) Albert Harbot	(England) Freda Barrett	(England) George Alan Thomas (England) Herbert Uber	(England) Violet Elton (England) Freda Barret	(Republic of Ireland) Ian Maconachie (Republic of Ireland) Marion Armstrong	
1928	(Republic of Ireland) Ian Maconachie	(England) Margaret Tragett	(Republic of Ireland) Ian Maconachie (Republic of Ireland) H. E. B. Neilson	(England) Margaret Tragett (England) E. F. C. MacDonald	(Republic of Ireland) Ian Maconachie (Republic of Ireland) Marion Armstrong	
1929	(England) Thomas P. Dick	(England) Freda Barrett	(England) Thomas P. Dick (England) Frank Hodge	(England) Freda Barrett (England) Marian Horsley	(Scotland) James Barr (Scotland) C. T. Duncan	
1930	(Republic of Ireland) Willoughby Hamilton	(England) Marian Horsley	(Republic of Ireland) Arthur Hamilton (Republic of Ireland) Willoughby Hamilton	(England) Margaret Tragett (Scotland) C. T. Duncan	(Republic of Ireland) Arthur Hamilton (Republic of Ireland) Mavis Hamilton	
1931	(England) Raymond White	(England) Betty Uber	(England) K. G. Livingstone (England) Raymond White	(England) Marian Horsley (England) Betty Uber	(England) Thomas P. Dick (England) Marian Horsley	
1932	(Republic of Ireland) Willoughby Hamilton	(Republic of Ireland) Mavis Hamilton	(Republic of Ireland) Arthur Hamilton (Republic of Ireland) Willoughby Hamilton	(England) Margaret Tragett (Scotland) C. T. Duncan	(Republic of Ireland) Willoughby Hamilton (Republic of Ireland) M. Story	
1933	(England) Donald Hume	(England) Alice Woodroffe	(Republic of Ireland) Thomas Boyle (Republic of Ireland) James Rankin	(England) Marian Horsley (England) Brenda Speaight	(England) Donald Hume (England) Betty Uber	
1934	(Republic of Ireland) Willoughby Hamilton	(Republic of Ireland) Mavis Hamilton	(Republic of Ireland) Willoughby Hamilton (Republic of Ireland) Ian Maconachie	(England) Marian Horsley (England) Brenda Speaight	(England) Ian Maconachie (England) Marian Horsley	
1935	(England) C. H. Whittaker	(England) Thelma Kingsbury	(England) Donald Hume (England) Raymond White	(England) Marje Henderson (England) Thelma Kingsbury	(England) Donald Hume (England) Betty Uber	
1936	(England) C. H. Whittaker	(England) Thelma Kingsbury	(Republic of Ireland) Thomas Boyle (Republic of Ireland) James Rankin	(England) Marje Henderson (England) Thelma Kingsbury	(Republic of Ireland) Ian Maconachie (England) Thelma Kingsbury	
1937	(England) Ralph Nichols	(England) Daphne Young	(England) Ralph Nichols (Republic of Ireland) Ian Maconachie	(England) Marje Henderson (England) Thelma Kingsbury	(Republic of Ireland) Ian Maconachie (England) Thelma Kingsbury	
1938	(England) Thomas Boyle	(England) Betty Uber	(Republic of Ireland) Thomas Boyle (Republic of Ireland) James Rankin	(Republic of Ireland) Olive Wilson (England) Betty Uber	(Republic of Ireland) Ian Maconachie (England) Betty Uber	
1939	(England) Ralph Nichols	(England) Betty Uber	(Republic of Ireland) Thomas Boyle (Republic of Ireland) J. W. McGarry	(England) Diana Doveton (England) Betty Uber	(England) Raymond White (England) Betty Uber	
1940– 1946	No competition due to World War II					
1947	(England) Noel Radford	(England) M. G. Welsh	(England) Ralph Nichols (Republic of Ireland) Ian Maconachie	(England) Bessie Shearlaw (England) C. B. Alison	(England) Ralph Nichols (England) Bessie Shearlaw	
1948	(England) Noel Radford	(England) Q. M. Allen	(Northern Ireland) Tom Henry (Republic of Ireland) Frank Peard	(England) Q. M. Allen (England) Betty Uber	(Republic of Ireland) James Rankin (England) Betty Uber	
1949	(Republic of Ireland) Frank Peard	(England) Q. M. Allen	(Northern Ireland) Tom Henry (Republic of Ireland) Frank Peard	(England) Q. M. Allen (England) Betty Uber	(Republic of Ireland) James Rankin (England) Betty Uber	
1950	(Republic of Ireland) Frank Peard	(England) Q. M. Allen	(England) Ralph Nichols (England) Barron Renton	(England) Q. M. Allen (England) Betty Uber	(Republic of Ireland) James Rankin (England) Betty Uber	
1951	(Federation of Malaya) Eddy B. Choong	(England) Elisabeth O'Beirne	(Federation of Malaya) Eddy L. Choong (Federation of Malaya) Eddy B. Choong	(England) Queenie Weber (England) Betty Uber	(England) H. J. Wingfield (England) Betty Uber	
1952	(Malaysia) Heah Hock Aun	(England) Elisabeth O'Beirne	(Federation of Malaya) Eddy L. Choong (Federation of Malaya) Eddy B. Choong	(England) Elisabeth O'Beirne (England) E. F. Andrews	(Malaysia) Heah Hock Aun (United States) G. F. Saunders	
1953	(Federation of Malaya) Eddy B. Choong	(Scotland) Nancy Horner	(Federation of Malaya) Eddy L. Choong (Federation of Malaya) Eddy B. Choong	(England) Queenie Allen-Weber (Scotland) Nancy Horner	(Federation of Malaya) Eddy L. Choong (Scotland) Nancy Horner	
1954	(New Zealand) Jeffrey Robson	(England) Iris Cooley	(England) J. D. McColl (England) Tony Jordan	(England) Iris Cooley (England) June White	(England) Tony Jordan (England) June White	
1955	(Republic of Ireland) James Doyle	(England) Iris Cooley	(Republic of Ireland) Frank Peard (Republic of Ireland) James Fitzgibbon	(England) Iris Cooley (England) June White	(England) John Best (England) Iris Cooley	
1956	(England) J. D. McColl	(England) Iris Cooley	(England) Warwick Shute (England) John Best	(England) Iris Cooley (England) June Timperley	(England) Tony Jordan (England) June Timperley	
1957	(Federation of Malaya) Eddy B. Choong	(Denmark) Tonny Ahm	(Federation of Malaya) Eddy B. Choong (Federation of Malaya) Oon Chong Teik	(Denmark) Tonny Ahm (Denmark) T. Peterson	(Scotland) A. I. McIntyre (Scotland) E. McKenzie	
1958	(Federation of Malaya) Oon Chong Jin	(England) Heather Ward	(England) Hugh Findlay (Federation of Malaya) Oon Chong Jin	(England) Iris Rogers (England) June Timperley	(England) John Best (England) Iris Rogers	
1959	(Scotland) Bob McCoig	(Scotland) Wilma Tyre	(Scotland) Tony Horden (Scotland) Donald Ross	(Scotland) Wilma Tyre (Scotland) Maggie McIntosh	(Scotland) Bob McCoig (Scotland) Wilma Tyre	
1960	(England) Trevor Coates	(Denmark) Inge Haselsteen	(England) Hugh Findlay (England) Ronald Lockwood	(Denmark) Tonny Holst-Christensen (Denmark) Inge Hasselsteen	(England) Tony Jordan (England) June Timperley	
1961	(Thailand) Charoen Wattanasin	(United States) Judy Hashman	(Scotland) Bob McCoig (Scotland) Frank Shannon	(Republic of Ireland) Sue Peard (United States) Judy Hashman	(Scotland) Bob McCoig (Scotland) Wilma Tyre	
1962	(Thailand) Charoen Wattanasin	(England) Ursula Smith	(Thailand) Charoen Wattanasin (Thailand) J. Lim	(England) Ursula Smith (England) Margaret Barrand	(Scotland) Bob McCoig (Scotland) Wilma Tyre	
1963	(Scotland) Bob McCoig	(Republic of Ireland) Mary O'Sullivan	(Scotland) Bob McCoig (Scotland) Frank Shannon	(Republic of Ireland) Mary O'Sullivan (Republic of Ireland) Yvonne Kelly	(Scotland) Mac Henderson (Scotland) Catherine Dunglison	
1964	(Scotland) Bob McCoig	(England) Ursula Smith	(England) Colin Beacom (England) Kenneth Derrick	(England) Angela Bairstow (England) Jenny Pritchard	(England) Tony Jordan (England) Patricia Page	
1965	(New Zealand) Richard Purser	(Scotland) Muriel Ferguson	(Scotland) Bob McCoig (Scotland) Frank Shannon	(Scotland) Catherine Dunglison (Scotland) Wilma Reid	(Scotland) Bob McCoig (Scotland) Wilma Reid	
1966	(Singapore) Lee Kin Tat	(England) Angela Bairstow	(England) Roger Mills (England) David Horton	(England) Angela Bairstow (England) Margaret Barrand	(England) Tony Jordan (England) Jenny Horton	
1967	(Singapore) Lee Kin Tat	(Scotland) Muriel Ferguson	(Scotland) Bob McCoig (Scotland) Mac Henderson	(England) Jenny Horton (England) Gillian Perrin	(England) David Horton (England) Jenny Horton	
1968	(Scotland) Bob McCoig	(England) Ursula Smith	(England) David Eddy (England) Roger Powell	(England) Jenny Horton (England) Ursula Smith	(England) Tony Jordan (England) Sue Pound	
1969	(Malaysia) Oon Chong Hau	(England) Margaret Boxall	(England) Ray Sharp (England) Paul Whetnall	(England) Margaret Boxall (England) Susan Whetnall	(England) Roger Mills (England) Susan Whetnall	
1970	(England) Paul Whetnall	(England) Margaret Boxall	(England) David Horton (England) Elliot Stuart	(England) Margaret Boxall (England) Susan Whetnall	(England) Roger Mills (England) Gillian Perrin	
1971	(England) Derek Talbot	(England) Gillian Gilks	(England) David Horton (England) Elliot Stuart	(England) Gillian Gilks (England) Margaret Beck	(England) Roger Mills (England) Gillian Gilks	
1972	(England) Ray Stevens	(England) Margaret Beck	(Scotland) Bob McCoig (Scotland) Fraser Gow	(England) Gillian Gilks (England) Bridget Cooper	(England) Derek Talbot (England) Gillian Gilks	
1973	(England) Colin Beacom	(Scotland) Joanna Flockhart	(Scotland) Jim Ansari (Scotland) John Britton	(England) Nora Gardner (England) Barbara Giles	(Scotland) Fraser Gow (Scotland) D. Stewart	
1974	(England) Paul Whetnall	(England) Margaret Beck	(Malaysia) Punch Gunalan (Denmark) Tom Bacher	(England) Margaret Boxall (England) Susan Whetnall	(England) Paul Whetnall (England) Nora Gardner	
1975	(New Zealand) R. Livingstone	(Netherlands) Marjan Luesken	(England) Derek Talbot (England) Elliot Stuart	(Netherlands) Marjan Luesken (England) Nora Gardner	(England) Elliot Stuart (England) Nora Gardner	
1976	(England) Paul Whetnall	(England) Gillian Gilks	(England) Ray Stevens (England) Mike Tredgett	(England) Gillian Gilks (England) Susan Whetnall	(England) Derek Talbot (England) Gillian Gilks	
1977	(Netherlands) Rob Ridder	(Netherlands) Marjan Ridder	(Netherlands) Rob Ridder (Netherlands) Piet Ridder	(Netherlands) Marjan Ridder (Netherlands) Hanke de Kort	(Scotland) Billy Gilliland (Scotland) Joanna Flockhart	
1978	(England) Derek Talbot	(England) Jane Webster	(England) Derek Talbot (England) Mike Tredgett	(England) Jane Webster (England) S. Whittaker	(Scotland) Billy Gilliland (Scotland) Joanna Flockhart	
1979	(England) Andy Goode	(England) Jane Webster	(United States) John Britton (United States) Gary Higgins	(England) Jane Webster (England) Karen Puttick	(Scotland) Billy Gilliland (Scotland) Joanna Flockhart	
1980	(England) Paul Whetnall	(England) Paula Kilvington	(England) Ray Stevens (England) Mike Tredgett	(England) Karen Bridge (England) Paula Kilvington	(England) Mike Tredgett (England) Karen Chapman	
1981	(England) Nick Yates	(England) Gillian Gilks	(England) Andy Goode (England) Gary Scott	(England) Gillian Gilks (England) Paula Kilvington	(Scotland) Billy Gilliland (England) Gillian Gilks	
1982	(Denmark) Morten Frost	(Denmark) Lene Køppen	(Scotland) Billy Gilliland (Scotland) Dan Travers	(England) Gillian Gilks (England) Gillian Clark	(Scotland) Billy Gilliland (England) Gillian Gilks	
1983	(Denmark) Morten Frost	(England) Sally Podger	(Scotland) Billy Gilliland (Scotland) Dan Travers	(England) Karen Beckman (England) Barbara Sutton	(Denmark) Morten Frost (Denmark) Nettie Nielsen	
1984	(Denmark) Morten Frost	(England) Sally Podger	(Denmark) Morten Frost (Denmark) Jesper Helledie	(Republic of Ireland) Barbara Beckett (Scotland) Alison Fulton	(Scotland) Billy Gilliland (England) Gillian Gowers	
1984	(China) Zhao Jianhua	(Denmark) Kirsten Larsen	(England) Andy Goode (England) Nigel Tier	(England) Karen Chapman (England) Jane Webster	(Scotland) Billy Gilliland (England) Karen Chapman	
1985	(Australia) Sze Yu	(Sweden) Christine Magnusson	(Denmark) Mark Christiansen (Denmark) Michael Kjeldsen	(Denmark) Dorte Kjaer (Denmark) Nettie Nielsen	(Scotland) Billy Gilliland (England) Gillian Gowers	
1986	(England) Steve Baddeley	(Sweden) Christine Magnusson	(Denmark) Jesper Knudsen (Denmark) Henrik Svarrer	(Denmark) Dorte Kjaer (Denmark) Nettie Nielsen	(England) Andy Goode (England) Fiona Elliott	
1987	(Denmark) Jens Peter Nierhoff	(England) Fiona Elliott	(Denmark) Jens Peter Nierhoff (Denmark) Michael Kjeldsen	(England) Gillian Gowers (England) Helen Troke	(Denmark) Thomas Lund (Denmark) Gitte Paulsen	
1988	(Denmark) Morten Frost	(Sweden) Christine Magnusson	(Denmark) Henrik Svarrer (Denmark) Claus Thomsen	(England) Gillian Clark (England) Sara Sankey	(Sweden) Pär-Gunnar Jönsson (Sweden) Maria Bengtsson	
1989	(Denmark) Morten Frost	(Denmark) Kirsten Larsen	(Denmark) Max Gandrup (Denmark) Thomas Lund	(England) Gillian Gowers (England) Gillian Clark	(Denmark) Jon Holst-Christensen (England) Gillian Gowers	
1990	(Denmark) Ib Frederiksen	(England) Helen Troke	(Sweden) Pär-Gunnar Jönsson (Sweden) Peter Axelsson	(Sweden) Maria Bengtsson (Sweden) Catrine Bengtsson	(Denmark) Jon Holst-Christensen (Denmark) Grete Mogensen	
1991	(England) Darren Hall	(Sweden) Lim Xiao Qing	(Denmark) Jon Holst-Christensen (Denmark) Thomas Lund	(Sweden) Christine Magnusson (Sweden) Lim Xiao Qing	(Denmark) Jon Holst-Christensen (Denmark) Grete Mogensen	
1992	(Finland) Pontus Jäntti	(Sweden) Lim Xiao Qing	(Sweden) Peter Axelsson (Sweden) Pär-Gunnar Jönsson	(Sweden) Christine Magnusson (Sweden) Lim Xiao Qing	(Sweden) Jan-Eric Antonsson (Sweden) Astrid Crabo	
1993	(England) Steven Butler	(Denmark) Camilla Martin	(Denmark) Jon Holst Christensen (Denmark) Thomas Lund	(Denmark) Lotte Olsen (Denmark) Lisbeth Stuer Lauridsen	(Denmark) Thomas Lund (Sweden) Catrine Bengtsson	
1994	(Sweden) Tomas Johansson	(Sweden) Lim Xiao Qing	(Russia) Andrey Antropov (Russia) Nikolai Zuyev	(Germany) Katrin Schmidt (Germany) Kerstin Uben	(Sweden) Jan-Eric Antonsson (Sweden) Astrid Crabo	
1995	(England) Peter Knowles	(Sweden) Catrine Bengtsson	(England) Nick Ponting (England) Julian Robertson	(Sweden) Maria Bengtsson (Sweden) Catrine Bengtsson	(Denmark) Lars Pedersen (Denmark) Anne Mette Bille	
1996	(Denmark) Peter Gade	(China) Liu Lufang	(Denmark) Jim Laugesen (Denmark) Thomas Stavngaard	(China) Liu Lu (China) Qiang Hong	(Sweden) Jens Olsson (Sweden) Astrid Crabo	
1997	(Netherlands) Tjitte Weistra	(England) Julia Mann	(Denmark) Jesper Mikla (Denmark) Lars Paaske	(England) Ella Miles (England) Sara Sankey	(Denmark) Lars Paaske (Denmark) Jane F. Bramsen	
1998	(Finland) Pontus Jäntti	(Sweden) Margit Borg	(Denmark) Michael Lamp (Denmark) Martin Lundgaard Hansen	(Denmark) Ann-Lou Jorgensen (Denmark) Mette Schjoldager	(Denmark) Michael Lamp (Denmark) Mette Schjoldager	
1999	(India) Pulela Gopichand	(Japan) Takako Ida	(Denmark) Michael Lamp (Denmark) Jonas Rasmussen	(Japan) Takae Masumo (Japan) Chikako Nakayama	(Denmark) Kristian Langbak (Denmark) Britta Andersen	
2000	(England) Colin Haughton	(Finland) Anu Weckström	(England) Peter Jeffrey (England) David Lindley	(Denmark) Pernille Harder (Denmark) Majken Vange	(England) David Lindley (England) Emma Chaffin	
2001	(Wales) Irwansyah	(Denmark) Christina Sörensen	(Denmark) Tommy Sørensen (Denmark) Jesper Thomsen	(Scotland) Sandra Watt (Scotland) Yuan Wemyss	(England) Robert Blair (England) Natalie Munt	
2002	(Finland) Antti Viitikko	(Japan) Yuki Shimada	(Denmark) Jesper Christensen (Denmark) Jesper Larsen	(Scotland) Kirsteen McEwan (Scotland) Yuan Wemyss	(England) Robert Blair (England) Natalie Munt	
2003	(Germany) Björn Joppien	(Germany) Xu Huaiwen	(Poland) Michał Łogosz (Poland) Robert Mateusiak	(Japan) Kumiko Ogura (Japan) Reiko Shiota	(England) Simon Archer (England) Donna Kellogg	
2004	(India) Arvind Bhat	(Scotland) Yuan Wemyss	(Sweden) Joakim Hansson (Sweden) Fredrik Bergström	(Poland) Kamila Augustyn (Poland) Nadieżda Kostiuczyk	(Sweden) Fredrik Bergström (Sweden) Johanna Persson	
2005	(Poland) Przemysław Wacha	(Russia) Ella Karachkova	(Indonesia) Imam Sodikin Irawan (Indonesia) Andi Tandaputra	(Russia) Valeri Sorokina (Russia) Nina Vislova	(England) Kristian Roebuck (England) Jenny Wallwork	
2006	(Finland) Ville Lång	(Russia) Ella Karachkova	(Sweden) Imanuel Hirschfeld (Sweden) Imam Sodikin	(Russia) Marina Yakusheva (Russia) Elena Shimko	(Russia) Vitaly Durkin (Russia) Valerya Sorokina	
2007	(Japan) Kenichi Tago	(Japan) Kanako Yonekura	(England) Robert Blair (England) David Lindley	(Russia) Nina Vislova (Russia) Valeria Sorokina	(England) Robert Blair (Scotland) Imogen Bankier	
2008	(England) Rajiv Ouseph	(England) Elizabeth Cann	(England) Richard Eidestedt (England) Andrew Ellis	(England) Mariana Agathangelou (Scotland) Jillie Cooper	(Germany) Michael Fuchs (Germany) Annekatrin Lillie	
2009	(Germany) Marc Zwiebler	(Scotland) Susan Egelstaff	(Denmark) Mads Conrad-Petersen (Denmark) Mads Pieler Kolding	(Russia) Valeria Sorokina (Russia) Nina Vislova	(Russia) Aleksandr Nikolaenko (Russia) Valeria Sorokina	
2010	(India) Anand Pawar	(Russia) Tatyana Bibik	(England) Marcus Ellis (England) Peter Mills	(England) Jenny Wallwork (England) Gabrielle White	(England) Chris Adcock (Scotland) Imogen Bankier	
2011	(England) Rajiv Ouseph	(Netherlands) Judith Meulendijks	(Russia) Vladimir Ivanov (Russia) Ivan Sozonov	(Sweden) Emelie Lennartsson (Sweden) Emma Wengberg	(Denmark) Kim Astrup Sorensen (Denmark) Line Kjaersfeldt	
2012	(India) Anand Pawar	(Japan) Sayaka Takahashi	(Japan) Takeshi Kamura (Japan) Keigo Sonoda	(Japan) Naoko Fukuman (Japan) Kurumi Yonao	(England) Marcus Ellis (England) Gabrielle White	
2013	(France) Brice Leverdez	(Spain) Carolina Marín	(Denmark) Mads Conrad-Petersen (Denmark) Mads Pieler Kolding	(Netherlands) Eefje Muskens (Netherlands) Selena Piek	(Scotland) Robert Blair (Scotland) Imogen Bankier	
2014	(Finland) Ville Lång	(Japan) Sayaka Sato	(Denmark) Mathias Christiansen (Denmark) David Daugaard	(Bulgaria) Gabriela Stoeva (Bulgaria) Stefani Stoeva	(Scotland) Robert Blair (Scotland) Imogen Bankier	
2015	(Denmark) Hans-Kristian Vittinghus	(Denmark) Line Kjaersfeldt	(Germany) Michael Fuchs (Germany) Johannes Schoettler	(Japan) Yuki Fukushima (Japan) Sayaka Hirota	(Russia) Vitalij Durkin (Russia) Nina Vislova	
2016	(Denmark) Anders Antonsen	(Denmark) Mette Poulsen	(Denmark) Mathias Christiansen (Denmark) David Daugaard	(Malaysia) Lim Yin Loo (Malaysia) Yap Cheng Wen	(Malaysia) Goh Soon Huat (Malaysia) Shevon Jemie Lai	
2017	(England) Toby Penty	(Scotland) Kirsty Gilmour	(Netherlands) Jelle Maas (Netherlands) Robin Tabeling	(Netherlands) Selena Piek (Netherlands) Cheryl Seinen	(Netherlands) Jacco Arends (Netherlands) Selena Piek	
2018	(China) Liu Haichao	(Scotland) Kirsty Gilmour	(England) Marcus Ellis (England) Chris Langridge	(Bulgaria) Gabriela Stoeva (Bulgaria) Stefani Stoeva	(England) Marcus Ellis (England) Lauren Smith	
2019	(India) Lakshya Sen	(France) Qi Xuefei	(Scotland) Alexander Dunn (Scotland) Adam Hall	(Denmark) Amalie Magelund (Denmark) Freja Ravn	(Denmark) Mathias Christiansen (Denmark) Alexandra Bøje	
2020	Cancelled (Note: This tournament, originally to be played from 19 to 22 November, was later postponed due to COVID-19 pandemic in Scotland.)					
2021	(Malaysia) Ng Tze Yong	(Chinese Taipei) Hsu Wen-chi	(Scotland) Christopher Grimley (Scotland) Matthew Grimley	(Canada) Rachel Honderich (Canada) Kristen Tsai	(England) Callum Hemming (England) Jessica Pugh	
2022	No competition					
2023	(Denmark) Mads Christophersen	(Turkey) Neslihan Arın	(Denmark) Daniel Lundgaard (Denmark) Mads Vestergaard	(Bulgaria) Gabriela Stoeva (Bulgaria) Stefani Stoeva	(Denmark) Mads Vestergaard (Denmark) Christine Busch	
2024	(Belgium) Julien Carraggi	(Denmark) Julie Dawall Jakobsen	(Denmark) William Kryger Boe (Denmark) Christian Faust Kjær	(Netherlands) Debora Jille (Denmark) Sara Thygesen	(Scotland) Alexander Dunn (Scotland) Julie MacPherson	
2025	(France) Arnaud Merklé	(Scotland) Kirsty Gilmour	(Denmark) Daniel Lundgaard (Denmark) Mads Vestergaard	(South Korea) Kim Min-ji (South Korea) Lee Ye-na	(Denmark) Rasmus Espersen (Denmark) Amalie Cecilie Kudsk	
2026						

== Performances by nation ==
As of the 2025 edition

	Nation	MS	WS	MD	WD	XD	Total
1	England	44	48	37.5	54.5	54	238
2	Denmark	11	10	21.5	8.5	13	64
3	Scotland	4	9	12	13	18	56
4	Ireland	8	3	15	2.5	7	35.5
5	Sweden	1	8	4	5	5.5	23.5
6	Malaya; Malaysia	7		5	1	2	15
7	Netherlands	2	3	2	4	1	12
7	Russia		3	2	4	3	12
9	Japan	1	5	1	4		11
10	Finland	5	1				6
10	Germany	2	1	1	1	1	6
12	India	5					5
13	China	2	1		1		4
14	Bulgaria				3		3
14	France	2	1				3
14	New Zealand	3					3
14	Poland	1		1	1		3
14	Thailand	2		1			3
14	United States		1	1	0.5	0.5	3
20	Singapore	2					2
21	Australia	1					1
21	Belgium	1					1
21	Canada				1		1
21	Chinese Taipei		1				1
21	Indonesia			1			1
21	South Korea				1		1
21	Spain		1				1
21	Turkey		1				1
21	Wales	1					1
	Total	105	97	105	105	105	517
