= Alice Woodroffe =

English badminton player

Personal information
- Born: Second quarter 1904 Marylebone

Sport
- Country: England
- Sport: Badminton

Alice Woodroffe married name Alice Teague (1904-date of death unknown) was an English international badminton player.

== Badminton career ==
Alice born in 1904 was a winner of the All England Open Badminton Championships. She won the women's 1933 All England Badminton Championships singles.

Woodroffe also won the 1932 Welsh International, the 1933 Scottish Open. She married Robert Teague in 1933 and later competed as Alice Teague, where she reached the final of the 1935 All England Badminton Championships singles final and won the 1935 Irish Open in women's singles.

== Achievements ==
=== International tournaments (5 titles, 7 runners-up) ===
Women's singles
Year	Tournament	Opponent	Score	Result
1932	All England Open	(England) Leoni Kingsbury	4–11, 11–5, 2–11	(silver) Runner-up
1932	Welsh International	(England) Leoni Kingsbury	11–7, 11–2	(gold) Winner
1933	All England Open	(England) Thelma Kingsbury	11–7, 11–5	(gold) Winner
1933	Scottish Open	(England) Marian Horsley	walkover	(gold) Winner
1934	Welsh International	(England) Thelma Kingsbury	8–11, 6–11	(silver) Runner-up
1935	Irish Open	(Republic of Ireland) Dorothy Colpoys	11–1, 11–5	(gold) Winner
1935	All England Open	(England) Betty Uber	1–11, 6–11	(silver) Runner-up

Women's doubles
Year	Tournament	Partner	Opponent	Score	Result
1932	Irish Open	(England) Marjorie Barrett	(England) Marian Horsley (England) Betty Uber	17–14, 4–15, 14–17	(silver) Runner-up
1932	Welsh International	(Wales) L. W. Myers	(England) Marian Horsley (England) Brenda Speaight	12–15, 15–2, 15–7	(gold) Winner
1933	Scottish Open	(Wales) L. W. Myers	(England) Marian Horsley (England) Brenda Speaight	16–17, 11–15	(silver) Runner-up
1934	Welsh International	(Wales) L. W. Myers	(England) Betty Uber (England) Thelma Kingsbury	10–15, 8–15	(silver) Runner-up

Mixed doubles
Year	Tournament	Partner	Opponent	Score	Result
1932	Irish Open	(England) Raymond M. White	(England) Donald C. Hume (England) Betty Uber	5–15, 8–15	(silver) Runner-up
