= 1933 All England Badminton Championships =

Tournament information
- Sport: Badminton
- Location: Royal Horticultural Halls, Westminster, England, United Kingdom
- Dates: March 6–March 10, 1933
- Established: 1899
- Website: All England Championships

The 1933 All England Championships was a badminton tournament held at the Royal Horticultural Halls, Westminster, England from March 6 to March 10, 1933.

== Final results ==
Category	Winners	Runners-up	Score
Men's singles	(England) Raymond White	(England) Donald Hume	15-10, 15-5
Women's singles	(England) Alice Woodroffe	(England) Thelma Kingsbury	11-7, 11-5
Men's doubles	(England) Raymond White & Donald Hume	(Republic of Ireland) Thomas Boyle & James Rankin	15-10, 15-7
Women's doubles	(England) Thelma Kingsbury & Marje Bell	(Wales) L W Myers & (England) Brenda Speaight	10-15, 15-11, 15-9
Mixed doubles	(England) Donald Hume & Betty Uber	(Republic of Ireland) Willoughby Hamilton & (England) Marian Horsley	18-15, 15-4

=== Results ===
==== Men's singles ====
Second round
(England) Raymond White	15	16	15
(England) F C Sharp	4	17	1
(Republic of Ireland) James Rankin	15	15
(England) A J Wilson	5	5
(England) Ralph Nichols +	15	15
(England) J H L Bolton	5	6
(England) Alan Titherley	w/o
(Republic of Ireland) Thomas Boyle
(England) Donald Hume +	15	15
(England) S C Minard	5	3
(England) Leslie Nichols +	15	15
(England) Tom Wingfield	8	5
(Republic of Ireland) Willoughby Hamilton	15	18
(England) R H Scollick	3	14
(England) Thomas P. Dick	15	15
(South Africa) Gerald Sherwell	4	7

Quarterfinals
(England) White	18	15
(Republic of Ireland) Rankin	15	8
(England) Nichols R	15	17	15
(England) Titherley	12	18	9
(England) Hume	15	18
(England) Nichols L	3	13
(Republic of Ireland) Hamilton W	3	15	15
(England) Dick	15	12	5

Semifinals
(England) White	15	7	15
(England) Nichols R	9	15	12
(England) Hume	18	15
(Republic of Ireland) Hamilton W	16	8

Final
(England) White	15	15
(England) Hume	10	5

+ Denotes seed

==== Women's singles ====
Second round
(England) Alice Woodroffe	11	11
(Republic of Ireland) Dorothy Colpoys	1	5
(England) Diana Doveton	11	11
(England) S N Manning	2	0
(England) Marjorie Barrett	13	11
(England) Margaret Tragett	12	6
(Republic of Ireland) Olive Wilson	w/o
(England) M D Dando
(England) Thelma Kingsbury	11	11
(Wales) B Neville	5	9
(England) Betty Uber	11	11
(England) D E Homan	1	0
(England) Leoni Kingsbury	11	11
(England) C D Newitt	5	2
(England) Nora Coop	w/o
(England) R M Dawson

Quarterfinals
(England) Woodroffe	11	11
(England) Doveton	7	1
(England) Barrett	11	11
(Republic of Ireland) Wilson	4	0
(England) Kingsbury T	9	11	11
(England) Uber	11	7	7
(England) Kingsbury L	11	11
(England) Coop	6	2

Semifinals
(England) Woodroffe	11	11
(England) Barrett	0	3
(England) Kingsbury T	11	11
(England) Kingsbury L	9	9

Final
(England) Woodroffe	11	11
(England) Kingsbury	7	5
