= Betty Uber =

English badminton and tennis player

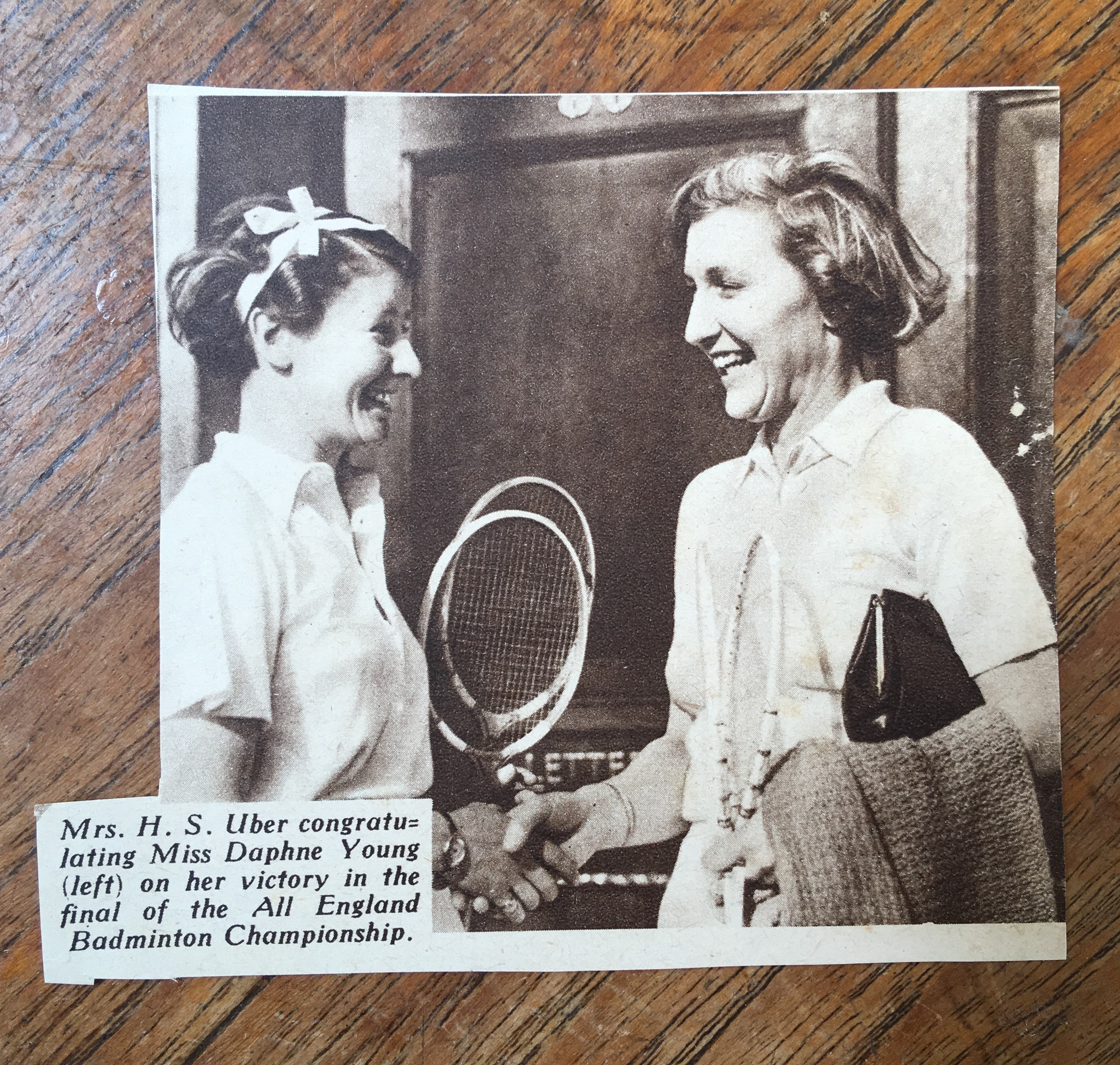
- Betty Uber (right) congratulates the All England singles champion 1938, Daphne Young.

Personal information
- Born: Elizabeth Corbin; 2 June 1906
- Died: 30 April 1983 (aged 76)

Sport
- Country: England
- Sport: Badminton
- Handedness: Right
- Event: Women's singles, Women's doubles & Mixed doubles

Elizabeth Uber (2 June 1906 – 30 April 1983, born Elizabeth Corbin) was an English badminton and tennis player.

== Career ==
Betty Uber won 13 titles at the All England Open Badminton Championships, 1 of them in women's singles, 4 in women's doubles and 8 in mixed doubles.

She was inducted into the World Badminton Hall of Fame as an Inaugural Member.

== Personal life ==
In 1925, she married Herbert Uber.

== Uber Cup ==
Her surname "Uber" is used for the Uber Cup, the world women's team badminton championship, because she had the idea of hosting the women's event similar to men in New Zealand back in 1950. She also made the draw for the 1956-1957 inaugural tournament, which took place at Lytham St. Annes in Lancashire, England.

== Achievements ==
=== International tournaments (56 titles, 18 runners-up) ===
Women's singles
Year	Tournament	Opponent	Score	Result
1930	Irish Open	(Republic of Ireland) Dorothy Colpoys	4–11, 11–9, 13–10	(gold) Winner
1930	All England Open	(England) Marjorie Barrett	2–11, 11–5, 9–11	(silver) Runner-up
1931	Scottish Open	(England) Margaret Tragett	11–5, 11–3	(gold) Winner
1932	Irish Open	(England) Marjorie Barrett	11–7, 11–6	(gold) Winner
1933	Welsh International	(England) Thelma Kingsbury	11–1, 8–11, 11–9	(gold) Winner
1935	Scottish Open	(England) Thelma Kingsbury	11–8, 5–11, 7–11	(silver) Runner-up
1935	All England Open	(England) Alice Teague	11–1, 11–6	(gold) Winner
1935	French Open	(England) Marian Horsley	11–2, 11–1	(gold) Winner
1936	All England Open	(England) Thelma Kingsbury	11–5, 3–11, 2–11	(silver) Runner-up
1938	Scottish Open	(England) Daphne Young	7–11, 12–11, 11–3	(gold) Winner
1938	All England Open	(England) Daphne Young	12–10, 11–12, 3–11	(silver) Runner-up
1938	Welsh International	(England) Daphne Young	5–11, 11–6, 11–6	(gold) Winner
1939	Scottish Open	(England) Daphne Young	11–9, 11–1	(gold) Winner
1947	Irish Open	(England) Queenie Allen	7–11, 8–11	(silver) Runner-up
1948	Scottish Open	(England) Queenie Allen	walkover	(silver) Runner-up
1948	South African Championships	(England) June Wheating	8–11, 12–10, 11–0	(gold) Winner
1950	Scottish Open	(England) Queenie Allen	12–10, 7–11, 8–11	(silver) Runner-up

Women's doubles
Year	Tournament	Partner	Opponent	Score	Result
1930	Irish Open	(England) Marian Horsley	(England) Violet Elton (Wales) L. W. Myers	15–9, 15–12	(gold) Winner
1931	Scottish Open	(England) Marian Horsley	(England) Margaret Tragett (Scotland) C. T. Duncan	15–12, 15–4	(gold) Winner
1931	All England Open	(England) Marian Horsley	(England) Marjorie Barrett (England) Violet Elton	12–15, 15–10, 15–5	(gold) Winner
1932	Irish Open	(England) Marian Horsley	(England) Marjorie Barrett (England) Alice Woodroffe	14–17, 15–4, 17–14	(gold) Winner
1933	Welsh International	(England) Thelma Kingsbury	(England) Craddock (England) Leoni Kingsbury	15–8, 15–6	(gold) Winner
1934	Irish Open	(England) Marian Horsley	(England) Marje Henderson (England) Thelma Kingsbury	15–6, 15–10	(gold) Winner
1934	Welsh International	(England) Thelma Kingsbury	(England) Alice Teague (Wales) L. W. Myers	15–10, 15–8	(gold) Winner
1935	Scottish Open	(Scotland) C. T. Duncan	(England) Marje Henderson (England) Thelma Kingsbury	14–17, 12–15	(silver) Runner-up
1935	All England Open	(England) Diana Doveton	(England) Marje Henderson (England) Thelma Kingsbury	5–15, 15–9, 8–15	(silver) Runner-up
1935	French Open	(England) Diana Doveton	(Scotland) Marian Armstrong (England) Margaret Tragett	15–0, 15–5	(gold) Winner
1935	Welsh International	(England) Thelma Kingsbury	(England) Mavis Henderson (England) Marian Horsley	15–6, 15–8	(gold) Winner
1936	Irish Open	(England) Marian Horsley	(England) Diana Doveton (England) Thelma Kingsbury	15–7, 15–10	(gold) Winner
1936	All England Open	(England) Diana Doveton	(England) Marje Henderson (England) Thelma Kingsbury	10–15, 15–5, 7–15	(silver) Runner-up
1937	All England Open	(England) Diana Doveton	(England) Marje Henderson (England) Thelma Kingsbury	17–18, 15–1, 15–2	(gold) Winner
1938	Scottish Open	(Republic of Ireland) Olive Wilson	(Scotland) Elizabeth Anderson (Scotland) J. Holmes	15–5, 15–4	(gold) Winner
1938	All England Open	(England) Diana Doveton	(England) Marje Henderson (England) Marian Horsley	15–6, 15–1	(gold) Winner
1938	Welsh International	(England) Diana Doveton	(England) Queenie Allen (England) Bessie Staples	15–6, 15–6	(gold) Winner
1939	Scottish Open	(England) Diana Doveton	(Republic of Ireland) Mavis Macnaughton (Republic of Ireland) Olive Wilson	15–4, 15–4	(gold) Winner
1947	Irish Open	(England) Queenie Allen	(Republic of Ireland) Nora Conway (Republic of Ireland) Barbara Good	15–8, 15–11	(gold) Winner
1948	Scottish Open	(England) Queenie Allen	(Republic of Ireland) Nora Conway (Republic of Ireland) Barbara Good	15–3, 15–10	(gold) Winner
1948	All England Open	(England) Queenie Allen	(Denmark) Tonny Ahm (Denmark) Kirsten Thorndahl	6–15, 15–12, 2–15	(silver) Runner-up
1948	Denmark Open	(England) Queenie Allen	(Denmark) Tonny Ahm (Denmark) Kirsten Thorndahl	4–15, 11–15	(silver) Runner-up
1948	South African Championships	(England) Queenie Allen	(South Africa) B. Bayne (South Africa) Florrie Mckenzie	15–7, 15–8	(gold) Winner
1949	Scottish Open	(England) Queenie Allen	(England) V. E. Duringer (England) Joy Saunders	15–7, 15–2	(gold) Winner
1949	Irish Open	(England) Queenie Allen	(Republic of Ireland) Nora Conway (Republic of Ireland) Barbara Good	15–1, 15–7	(gold) Winner
1949	All England Open	(England) Queenie Allen	(Denmark) Tonny Ahm (Denmark) Kirsten Thorndahl	15–8, 15–10	(gold) Winner
1950	Scottish Open	(England) Queenie Allen	(England) V. E. Duringer (Scotland) Nancy Horner	15–5, 15–8	(gold) Winner
1950	All England Open	(England) Queenie Allen	(Denmark) Tonny Ahm (Denmark) Kirsten Thorndahl	17–16, 5–15, 8–15	(silver) Runner-up
1951	Scottish Open	(England) Queenie Webber	(England) Elisabeth O'Beirne (Malaysia) Amy Choong	15–4, 15–7	(gold) Winner
1952	All England Open	(England) Queenie Webber	(Denmark) Tonny Ahm (Denmark) Aase Schiøtt Jacobsen	15–18, 4–15	(silver) Runner-up

Mixed doubles
Year	Tournament	Partner	Opponent	Score	Result
1929	All England Open	(England) Herbert Uber	(Republic of Ireland) Frank Devlin (England) Marian Horsley	8–15, 6–15	(silver) Runner-up
1930	Irish Open	(England) Herbert Uber	(England) Frank Hodge (England) Violet Elton	15–4, 15–10	(gold) Winner
1930	All England Open	(England) Herbert Uber	(England) B. P. Cook (England) C. M. Patten	18–13, 15–4	(gold) Winner
1931	All England Open	(England) Herbert Uber	(Republic of Ireland) Frank Devlin (England) Marian Horsley	8–15, 15–8, 15–9	(gold) Winner
1932	Irish Open	(England) Donald C. Hume	(England) Raymond M. White (England) Alice Woodroffe	15–5, 15–8	(gold) Winner
1932	All England Open	(England) Herbert Uber	(England) Raymond M. White (England) Hazel Hogarth	18–16, 15–9	(gold) Winner
1933	Scottish Open	(England) Donald C. Hume	(England) Alan Titherley (Scotland) C. T. Duncan	15–8, 15–8	(gold) Winner
1933	All England Open	(England) Donald C. Hume	(Republic of Ireland) Willoughby Hamilton (England) Marian Horsley	18–15, 15–4	(gold) Winner
1933	Welsh International	(England) Donald C. Hume	(Republic of Ireland) Ian Maconachie (England) Marian Horsley	15–12, 15–12	(gold) Winner
1934	Irish Open	(England) Donald C. Hume	(Republic of Ireland) Ian Maconachie (England) Marian Horsley	15–12, 15–8	(gold) Winner
1934	All England Open	(England) Donald C. Hume	(Republic of Ireland) Ian Maconachie (England) Marian Horsley	15–12, 15–10	(gold) Winner
1934	Welsh International	(England) B. P. Cook	(Republic of Ireland) Ian Maconachie (England) Marian Horsley	11–15, 15–2, 15–6	(gold) Winner
1935	Scottish Open	(England) Donald C. Hume	(England) Raymond M. White (Scotland) Marian Armstrong	15–6, 15–3	(gold) Winner
1935	All England Open	(England) Donald C. Hume	(England) Raymond M. White (Scotland) Marian Armstrong	15–3, 15–1	(gold) Winner
1935	French Open	(England) Geoffrey J. Fish	(England) Ralph Nichols (England) Diana Doveton	11–15, 10–15	(silver) Runner-up
1936	Irish Open	(England) Donald C. Hume	(Republic of Ireland) Ian Maconachie (England) Marian Horsley	15–4, 15–6	(gold) Winner
1936	All England Open	(England) Donald C. Hume	(Republic of Ireland) Ian Maconachie (England) Thelma Kingsbury	18–15, 15–8	(gold) Winner
1937	Scottish Open	(England) Donald C. Hume	(Republic of Ireland) Ian Maconachie (England) Thelma Kingsbury	6–15, 11–15	(silver) Runner-up
1938	Scottish Open	(Republic of Ireland) Ian Maconachie	(Republic of Ireland) Thomas Boyle (Republic of Ireland) Olive Wilson	15–8, 15–3	(gold) Winner
1938	All England Open	(England) Raymond M. White	(England) Ralph Nichols (England) Bessie Staples	15–10, 15–9	(gold) Winner
1938	Welsh International	(England) Alan Titherley	(Republic of Ireland) Thomas Boyle (Republic of Ireland) Olive Wilson	5–15, 10–15	(silver) Runner-up
1939	Scottish Open	(England) Raymond M. White	(Republic of Ireland) Thomas Boyle (Republic of Ireland) Olive Wilson	15–6, 17–14	(gold) Winner
1948	Scottish Open	(Republic of Ireland) James Rankin	(England) Harold Marsland (England) Queenie Allen	15–12, 15–13	(gold) Winner
1948	South African Championships	(England) Noel B. Radford	(England) Warwick Shute (England) Queenie Allen	15–13, 15–12	(gold) Winner
1949	Scottish Open	(Republic of Ireland) James Rankin	(Scotland) James C. Mackay (Scotland) C. B. Alison	15–8, 15–6	(gold) Winner
1950	Scottish Open	(Republic of Ireland) James Rankin	(England) Noel B. Radford (England) L. R. Ludlam	15–10, 15–12	(gold) Winner
1951	Scottish Open	(England) Tom Wingfield	(Republic of Ireland) Frank Peard (England) Queenie Webber	12–15, 15–10, 15–12	(gold) Winner

== Tennis ==
In addition to badminton Uber also competed in tennis and played at the Wimbledon Championships in singles and doubles between 1929 and 1946. Her best singles performance was in 1930 when she reached the fourth round in which she lost to seventh-seeded Phyllis Mudford.
