= 1932 All England Badminton Championships =

Tournament information
- Sport: Badminton
- Location: Royal Horticultural Hall, Westminster, England, United Kingdom
- Dates: February 28–March 6, 1932
- Established: 1899
- Website: All England Championships

The 1932 All England Championships was a badminton tournament held at the Royal Horticultural Hall, Westminster, England from February 28 to March 6, 1932.

== Final results ==
Category	Winners	Runners-up	Score
Men's singles	(England) Ralph Nichols	(England) Raymond White	5-15, 15-11, 18-16
Women's singles	(England) Leoni Kingsbury	(England) Alice Woodroffe	11-4, 5-11, 11-2
Men's doubles	(England) Raymond White & Donald Hume	(England) Ralph Nichols & Leslie Nichols	14-15, 18-16, 15-4
Women's doubles	(England) Leoni Kingsbury & Marjorie Barrett	(Wales) L W Myers & (England) Brenda Speaight	9-15, 18-16, 15-4
Mixed doubles	(England) Herbert Uber & Betty Uber	(England) Raymond White & Hazel Hogarth	18-16 15-9

=== Results ===
==== Men's singles ====
Second round
(England) Ralph Nichols	15	15
(South Africa) Gerald Sherwell	6	9
(England) Alan Titherley	15	15
(England) G R Dunning	6	5
(Republic of Ireland) Willoughby Hamilton	15	15
(England) Eric William L Cowan	3	2
(England) Leslie Nichols	15	9	15
(Scotland) F L Treasure	13	15	6
(England) Raymond White	15	15
(England) S Jackson	6	4
(England) Donald Hume	15	15
(England) F Hellings	5	11
(England) Thomas P. Dick	10	15	18
(England) B H Sheldon	15	10	13
(Republic of Ireland) Arthur Hamilton	15	15
(England) A R Bruce	8	4

Quarterfinals
(England) Nichols R	15	15	15
(England) Titherley	18	11	7
(Republic of Ireland) Hamilton W	15	11	15
(England) Nichols L	10	15	7
(England) White	15	14	15
(England) Hume	8	15	9
(England) Dick	15	15
(Republic of Ireland) Hamilton A	6	5

Semifinals
(England) Nichols R	12	15	15
(Republic of Ireland) Hamilton W	15	8	10
(England) White	15	9	15
(England) Dick	0	15	8

Final
(England) Nichols	5	15	18
(England) White	15	11	16

==== Women's singles ====
Second round
(England) Leoni Kingsbury	11	11
(England) E K Sturch	3	3
(England) Brenda Speaight	w/o
(England) E M Roe
(England) Betty Uber	11	11
(Wales) B Neville	1	0
(Republic of Ireland) Mavis Hamilton	11	11
(England) M Lonsdale	3	8
(England) Alice Woodroffe	6	13	11
(England) Marian Horsley	11	10	0
(England) Thelma Kingsbury	11	11
(England) T Webster	1	4
(England) Margaret Tragett	11	11
(England) Marjorie Barrett	5	7
(Scotland) J R Stewart	11	11
(England) N M Conroy	1	3

Quarterfinals
(England) Kingsbury L	11	11
(England) Speaight	4	1
(England) Uber	11	11
(Republic of Ireland) Hamilton	2	6
(England) Woodroffe	11	11
(England) Kingsbury T	5	8
(England) Tragett	2	11	11
(Scotland) Stewart	11	7	7

Semifinals
(England) Kingsbury L	7	11	11
(England) Uber	11	4	3
(England) Woodroffe	11	11
(England) Tragett	3	4

Final
(England) Kingsbury	11	5	11
(England) Woodroffe	4	11	2
