= Leoni Kingsbury =

English badminton player

Personal information
- Born: 1909 Portsmouth, England
- Died: 29 July 1970 (aged 60–61) Cape Town, South Africa

Sport
- Country: England
- Sport: Badminton

Leoni May Kingsbury (1909-1970) was an English international badminton player.

== Badminton career ==
Leoni born in 1909 was a three times winner of the All England Open Badminton Championships. She won the women's singles twice and doubles once.

== Personal life ==
Her sister Thelma Kingsbury was also a leading badminton player.

== Achievements ==
=== International tournaments (3 titles, 3 runners-up) ===
Women's singles
Year	Tournament	Opponent	Score	Result
1931	All England Open	(England) Marjorie Barrett	8–11, 11–4, 9–14	(silver) Runner-up
1932	All England Open	(England) Alice Woodroffe	11–4, 5–11, 11–2	(gold) Winner
1932	Welsh International	(England) Alice Woodroffe	7–11, 2–11	(silver) Runner-up
1934	All England Open	(England) Thelma Kingsbury	11–4, 11–6	(gold) Winner

Women's doubles
Year	Tournament	Partner	Opponent	Score	Result
1932	All England Open	(England) Marjorie Barrett	(Wales) L. W. Myers (England) Brenda Speaight	9–15, 18–16, 15–4	(gold) Winner
1933	Welsh International	(England) Craddock	(England) Thelma Kingsbury (England) Betty Uber	8–15, 6–15	(silver) Runner-up
