= Jesper Bie =

Danish badminton player

Personal information
- Born: 11 December 1920

Sport
- Country: Denmark
- Sport: Badminton

Jesper Bie (born 11 December 1920) was a Danish badminton player. He was the Danish youth champion in 1938, the year that he finished runner up behind Ralph Nichols in the 1938 All England Badminton Championships. This opened up the floodgates of Danish stars that would then grace the Championships and dominate badminton for the next two decades.
