= Thelma Kingsbury =

Badminton player

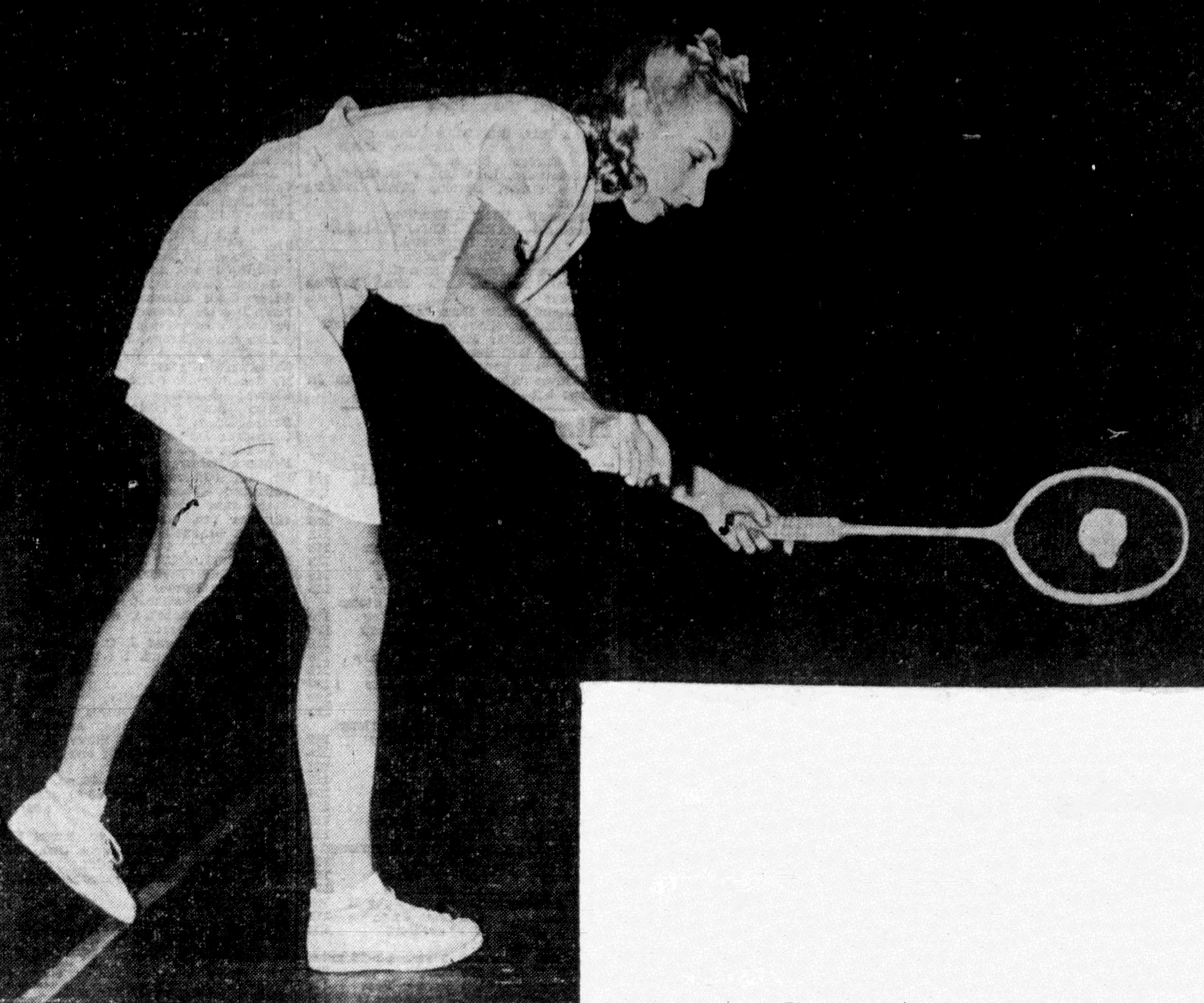
- Kingsbury, circa 1942

Personal information
- Born: 12 January 1911 Portsmouth, England
- Died: 27 August 1979 (aged 68) Los Angeles, United States

Sport
- Country: England; United States
- Sport: Badminton
- Handedness: Left

Thelma Kingsbury (1911–1979), (later, in succession: Thelma Scovil, Thelma Welcome, Thelma Lougheed) was an English-born, naturalised American sportswoman who won major badminton titles in the British Isles and then in the US from the early 1930s to the early 1950s.

== Badminton career ==
Equally adept in singles and doubles she won two women's singles titles and four women's doubles titles at the prestigious All-England Championships between 1933 and 1937.

In the 1935–1936 season, she achieved a British "Grand Slam" by winning the open singles titles of England, Ireland, Scotland, and Wales. After emigrating from Britain to the US, she won the U.S. women's singles title in 1941 and shared the U.S. women's doubles title with Janet Wright in 1941, 1947, 1948, 1949, and 1950. Though reaching 40 in the early 1950s, she continued to play highly competitive singles matches against such formidable opponents as Ethel Marshall, Margaret Varner, and a teenage Judy Devlin (Hashman). Thelma Kingsbury was among the initial class of players elected to the U.S. Badminton Hall of Fame in 1956.

== Personal life ==
Her sister Leoni Kingsbury was also a leading badminton player.

== Achievements ==
=== International tournaments (24 titles, 11 runners-up) ===
Women's singles
Year	Tournament	Opponent	Score	Result
1931	Welsh International	(England) Marian Horsley	11–4, 11–3	(gold) Winner
1933	All England Open	(England) Alice Woodroffe	7–11, 5–11	(silver) Runner-up
1933	Welsh International	(England) Betty Uber	1–11, 11–8, 9–11	(silver) Runner-up
1934	Irish Open	(England) D. Kenny	11–2, 11–2	(gold) Winner
1934	All England Open	(England) Leoni Kingsbury	4–11, 6–11	(silver) Runner-up
1934	Welsh International	(England) Alice Teague	11–8, 11–6	(gold) Winner
1935	Scottish Open	(England) Betty Uber	8–11, 11–5, 11–7	(gold) Winner
1935	Welsh International	(England) Greta Graham	11–5, 11–4	(gold) Winner
1936	Scottish Open	(England) Daphne Young	11–3, 11–4	(gold) Winner
1936	Irish Open	(England) Diana Doveton	11–1, 11–3	(gold) Winner
1936	All England Open	(England) Betty Uber	5–11, 11–3, 11–2	(gold) Winner
1936	Welsh International	(England) Greta Graham	2–11, 10–13	(silver) Runner-up
1937	Scottish Open	(England) Daphne Young	7–11, 6–11	(silver) Runner-up
1937	All England Open	(England) Diana Doveton	11–0, 11–0	(gold) Winner

Women's doubles
Year	Tournament	Partner	Opponent	Score	Result
1931	Welsh International	(England) Hazel Hogarth	(England) Nora Coop (England) Diana Doveton	15–6, 15–11	(gold) Winner
1933	All England Open	(England) Marje Bell	(Wales) L. W. Myers (England) Brenda Speaight	10–15, 15–11, 15–9	(gold) Winner
1933	Welsh International	(England) Betty Uber	(England) Craddock (England) Leoni Kingsbury	15–8, 15–6	(gold) Winner
1934	Irish Open	(England) Marje Henderson	(England) Marian Horsley (England) Betty Uber	6–15, 10–15	(silver) Runner-up
1934	All England Open	(England) Marje Henderson	(Wales) L. W. Myers (England) Brenda Speaight	15–8, 15–5	(gold) Winner
1934	Welsh International	(England) Betty Uber	(Wales) L. W. Myers (England) Alice Teague	15–10, 15–8	(gold) Winner
1935	Scottish Open	(England) Marje Henderson	(Scotland) C. T. Duncan (England) Betty Uber	17–14, 15–12	(gold) Winner
1935	All England Open	(England) Marje Henderson	(England) Betty Uber (England) Diana Doveton	15–5, 9–15, 15–8	(gold) Winner
1935	Welsh International	(England) Betty Uber	(England) Mavis Henderson (England) Marian Horsley	15–6, 15–8	(gold) Winner
1936	Scottish Open	(England) Marje Henderson	(Scotland) Elizabeth Anderson (Scotland) E. W. Greenwood	15–11, 15–6	(gold) Winner
1936	Irish Open	(England) Diana Doveton	(England) Marian Horsley (England) Betty Uber	7–15, 10–15	(silver) Runner-up
1936	All England Open	(England) Marje Henderson	(England) Betty Uber (England) Diana Doveton	15–10, 5–15, 15–7	(gold) Winner
1936	Welsh International	(England) Marian Horsley	(England) Dorothy Graham (England) Greta Graham	7–15, 17–18	(silver) Runner-up
1937	Scottish Open	(England) Marje Henderson	(Scotland) Elizabeth Anderson (Scotland) M. K. Morton	15–6, 15–11	(gold) Winner
1937	All England Open	(England) Marje Henderson	(England) Betty Uber (England) Diana Doveton	18–17, 1–15, 2–15	(silver) Runner-up
1955	U.S. Open	(United States) Janet Wright	(United States) Judy Devlin (United States) Susan Devlin	10–15, 9–15	(silver) Runner-up

Mixed doubles
Year	Tournament	Partner	Opponent	Score	Result
1936	Scottish Open	(Republic of Ireland) Ian Maconachie	(Republic of Ireland) James Rankin (England) Marian Horsley	15–3, 17–15	(gold) Winner
1936	All England Open	(Republic of Ireland) Ian Maconachie	(England) Donald C. Hume (England) Betty Uber	15–18, 8–15	(silver) Runner-up
1936	Welsh International	(England) Raymond M. White	(Republic of Ireland) Ian Maconachie (England) Marian Horsley	15–7, 5–15, 15–12	(gold) Winner
1937	Scottish Open	(Republic of Ireland) Ian Maconachie	(England) Donald C. Hume (England) Betty Uber	15–6, 15–11	(gold) Winner
1937	All England Open	(Republic of Ireland) Ian Maconachie	(England) Ralph Nichols (Scotland) J. W. Stewart	15–11, 15–12	(gold) Winner
