= Raymond Maurice White =

English badminton player

Raymond White
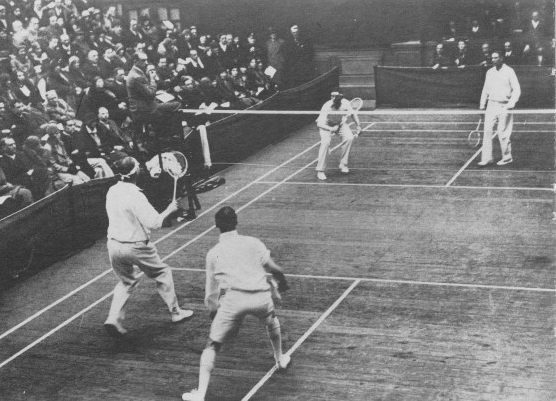

Personal information
- Born: 16 September 1909
- Died: 1972 (aged 62–63)

Sport
- Country: England
- Sport: Badminton
Medal record
Representing ENG
All England Open Badminton Championships
| Gold medal – first place | 1933 London | singles |
| Gold medal – first place | 1935 London | singles |
| Gold medal – first place | 1932 London | doubles |
| Gold medal – first place | 1933 London | doubles |
| Gold medal – first place | 1934 London | doubles |
| Gold medal – first place | 1935 London | doubles |
| Gold medal – first place | 1938 London | mixed |

Raymond Maurice "Bill" White (1909–1972) was an English international badminton player. White is known as the first player in badminton to play with shorts in general where he famously worn during All England Open tournament.

== Badminton career ==
White won the All England Open Badminton Championships, considered the unofficial World Badminton Championships, in men's singles twice, in 1933 and in 1935. He also won the Men's Doubles with Donald C. Hume for four consecutive years from 1932 to 1935 and the 1938 mixed doubles with Betty Uber.

He was part of the English touring team that visited Canada during 1930. A match was held at the Granite Club in Toronto which England won 7–2.

== Achievements ==
=== International tournaments (21 titles, 20 runners-up) ===
Men's singles

| Year | Tournament | Opponent | Score | Result |
|---|---|---|---|---|
| 1930 | Irish Open | (Republic of Ireland) Willoughby Hamilton | 15–17, 12–15 | (silver) Runner-up |
| 1931 | Scottish Open | (England) Donald C. Hume | 11–15, 15–4, 15–1 | (gold) Winner |
| 1932 | Irish Open | (England) Thomas P. Dick | 15–7, 15–3 | (gold) Winner |
| 1932 | All England Open | (England) Ralph Nichols | 15–5, 11–15, 16–18 | (silver) Runner-up |
| 1932 | Welsh International | (Republic of Ireland) Willoughby Hamilton | 9–15, 6–15 | (silver) Runner-up |
| 1933 | All England Open | (England) Donald C. Hume | 15–10, 15–5 | (gold) Winner |
| 1933 | Welsh International | (Republic of Ireland) Willoughby Hamilton | 14–16, 10–15 | (silver) Runner-up |
| 1934 | Irish Open | (England) Alan Titherley | 14–17, 15–12, 15–7 | (gold) Winner |
| 1934 | Welsh International | (Republic of Ireland) Willoughby Hamilton | 3–15, 15–4, 15–11 | (gold) Winner |
| 1935 | All England Open | (England) Ralph Nichols | 15–10, 15–7 | (gold) Winner |
| 1935 | Welsh International | (England) Kenneth Wilson | 15–3, 15–6 | (gold) Winner |
| 1936 | All England Open | (England) Ralph Nichols | 16–18, 18–17, 10–15 | (silver) Runner-up |
| 1937 | Welsh International | (Republic of Ireland) Thomas Boyle | 15–12, 3–15, 15–9 | (gold) Winner |

Men's doubles

| Year | Tournament | Partner | Opponent | Score | Result |
|---|---|---|---|---|---|
| 1931 | Scottish Open | (England) K. G. Livingstone | (England) Thomas P. Dick (England) Frank Hodge | 18–17, 15–9 | (gold) Winner |
| 1931 | All England Open | (England) K. G. Livingstone | (Republic of Ireland) Frank Devlin (Republic of Ireland) Curly Mack | 6–15, 15–11, 4–15 | (silver) Runner-up |
| 1932 | Irish Open | (England) Thomas P. Dick | (England) Donald C. Hume (England) Ralph Nichols | 11–15, 15–8, 2–15 | (silver) Runner-up |
| 1932 | All England Open | (England) Donald C. Hume | (England) Leslie Nichols (England) Ralph Nichols | 14–15, 18–16, 15–4 | (gold) Winner |
| 1932 | Welsh International | (England) Donald C. Hume | (Republic of Ireland) Willoughby Hamilton (England) Thomas P. Dick | 15–7, 11–15, 15–6 | (gold) Winner |
| 1933 | All England Open | (England) Donald C. Hume | (Republic of Ireland) Thomas Boyle (Republic of Ireland) James Rankin | 15–10, 15–7 | (gold) Winner |
| 1933 | Welsh International | (England) Donald C. Hume | (England) Kenneth Davidson (England) Alan Titherley | 15–4, 15–4 | (gold) Winner |
| 1934 | All England Open | (England) Donald C. Hume | (England) Leslie Nichols (England) Ralph Nichols | 15–12, 12–15, 15–7 | (gold) Winner |
| 1935 | Scottish Open | (England) Donald C. Hume | (England) Kenneth Davidson (England) Alan Titherley | 15–10, 15–7 | (gold) Winner |
| 1935 | All England Open | (England) Donald C. Hume | (England) Leslie Nichols (England) Ralph Nichols | 15–12, 15–13 | (gold) Winner |
| 1935 | Welsh International | (Republic of Ireland) Ian Maconachie | (England) H. E. Baldwin (England) C. H. Whittaker | 15–5, 15–7 | (gold) Winner |
| 1936 | All England Open | (England) Donald C. Hume | (England) Leslie Nichols (England) Ralph Nichols | 7–15, 2–15 | (silver) Runner-up |
| 1937 | Scottish Open | (England) Donald C. Hume | (Republic of Ireland) Ian Maconachie (England) Ralph Nichols | 15–8, 9–15, 7–15 | (silver) Runner-up |
| 1937 | All England Open | (England) Donald C. Hume | (England) Leslie Nichols (England) Ralph Nichols | 6–15, 14–18 | (silver) Runner-up |
| 1937 | Welsh International | (Republic of Ireland) Ian Maconachie | (England) H. E. Baldwin (England) Thomas P. Dick | 15–17, 6–15 | (silver) Runner-up |
| 1938 | All England Open | (Republic of Ireland) Ian Maconachie | (England) Leslie Nichols (England) Ralph Nichols | 12–15, 15–7, 9–15 | (silver) Runner-up |
| 1938 | Welsh International | (England) Tom Wingfield | (Republic of Ireland) Thomas Boyle (Republic of Ireland) James Rankin | 5–15, 9–15 | (silver) Runner-up |
| 1939 | Scottish Open | (England) Alan Titherley | (Republic of Ireland) Thomas Boyle (Republic of Ireland) J. W. McGarry | 9–15, 12–15 | (silver) Runner-up |
| 1939 | Denmark Open | (England) Ralph Nichols | (Denmark) Carl Frøhlke (Denmark) Tage Madsen | 15–6, 15–3 | (gold) Winner |

Mixed doubles

| Year | Tournament | Partner | Opponent | Score | Result |
|---|---|---|---|---|---|
| 1932 | Irish Open | (England) Alice Woodroffe | (England) Donald C. Hume (England) Betty Uber | 5–15, 8–15 | (silver) Runner-up |
| 1932 | All England Open | (England) Hazel Hogarth | (England) Herbert Uber (England) Betty Uber | 16–18, 9–15 | (silver) Runner-up |
| 1935 | Scottish Open | (Scotland) Marian Armstrong | (England) Donald C. Hume (England) Betty Uber | 6–15, 3–15 | (silver) Runner-up |
| 1935 | All England Open | (Scotland) Marian Armstrong | (England) Donald C. Hume (England) Betty Uber | 3–15, 1–15 | (silver) Runner-up |
| 1935 | Welsh International | (England) Mavis Green | (Republic of Ireland) Ian Maconachie (England) Marian Horsley | 11–15, 15–6, 6–15 | (silver) Runner-up |
| 1936 | Welsh International | (England) Thelma Kingsbury | (Republic of Ireland) Ian Maconachie (England) Marian Horsley | 15–7, 5–15, 15–12 | (gold) Winner |
| 1938 | All England Open | (England) Betty Uber | (England) Ralph Nichols (England) Bessie Staples | 15–10, 15–9 | (gold) Winner |
| 1939 | Scottish Open | (England) Betty Uber | (Republic of Ireland) Thomas Boyle (Republic of Ireland) Olive Wilson | 15–6, 17–14 | (gold) Winner |
| 1939 | Denmark Open | (England) Diana Doveton | (England) Ralph Nichols (England) Bessie Staples | 14–17, 7–15 | (silver) Runner-up |
