= Donald Charles Hume =

English badminton player

Donald Hume
Personal information
- Born: 6 September 1907
- Died: May 1986 (aged 78)

Sport
- Country: England
- Sport: Badminton
Medal record
Representing ENG
All England Open Badminton Championships
Gold medal – first place	1930 London	singles
Gold medal – first place	1932 London	doubles
Gold medal – first place	1933 London	doubles
Gold medal – first place	1934 London	doubles
Gold medal – first place	1935 London	doubles
Gold medal – first place	1933 London	mixed
Gold medal – first place	1934 London	mixed
Gold medal – first place	1935 London	mixed
Gold medal – first place	1936 London	mixed

Donald Charles Hume (6 September 1907 – 1986) was a male badminton player from England.

== Badminton career ==
Hume won the All England Open Badminton Championships, considered the unofficial World Badminton Championships, in men's singles in 1930. He also won the Men's Doubles with Raymond M. White for four consecutive years from 1932 to 1935 and the mixed doubles with Betty Uber from 1933 to 1936.

He was part of the English touring team that visited Canada during 1930. A match was held at the Granite Club in Toronto which England won 7-2.

== Achievements ==
=== International tournaments (23 titles, 12 runners-up) ===
Men's singles

Year	Tournament	Opponent	Score	Result
1929	Scottish Open	(England) Thomas P. Dick	5–15, 3–15	(silver) Runner-up
1929	All England Open	(Republic of Ireland) Frank Devlin	4–15, 1–15	(silver) Runner-up
1929	Welsh International	(England) Thomas P. Dick	15–3, 8–15, 15–7	(gold) Winner
1930	All England Open	(England) Alan Titherley	15–12, 15–12	(gold) Winner
1931	Scottish Open	(England) Raymond M. White	15–11, 4–15, 1–15	(silver) Runner-up
1933	All England Open	(England) Alan Titherley	15–6, 15–8	(gold) Winner
1933	All England Open	(England) Raymond M. White	10–15, 5–15	(silver) Runner-up

Men's doubles

Year	Tournament	Partner	Opponent	Score	Result
1929	Scottish Open	(England) P. D. Macfarlane	(England) Thomas P. Dick (England) Frank Hodge	4–15, 17–15, 3–15	(silver) Runner-up
1929	Welsh International	(England) Ralph Nichols	(Republic of Ireland) Arthur Hamilton (Republic of Ireland) Willoughby Hamilton	15–12, 15–7	(gold) Winner
1930	Irish Open	(England) Herbert Uber	(England) Thomas P. Dick (England) Frank Hodge	15–9, 15–10	(gold) Winner
1932	Irish Open	(England) Ralph Nichols	(England) Raymond M. White (England) Thomas P. Dick	15–11, 8–15, 15–2	(gold) Winner
1932	All England Open	(England) Raymond M. White	(England) Leslie Nichols (England) Ralph Nichols	14–15, 18–16, 15–4	(gold) Winner
1932	Welsh International	(England) Raymond M. White	(England) Thomas P. Dick (Republic of Ireland) Willoughby Hamilton	15–7, 11–15, 15–6	(gold) Winner
1933	All England Open	(England) Raymond M. White	(Republic of Ireland) Thomas Boyle (Republic of Ireland) James Rankin	15–10, 15–7	(gold) Winner
1933	Welsh International	(England) Raymond M. White	(England) Kenneth Davidson (England) Alan Titherley	15–4, 15–4	(gold) Winner
1934	Irish Open	(England) Ralph Nichols	(Republic of Ireland) Ian Maconachie (Republic of Ireland) Willoughby Hamilton	9–15, 15–12, 5–15	(silver) Runner-up
1934	All England Open	(England) Raymond M. White	(England) Leslie Nichols (England) Ralph Nichols	15–12, 12–15, 15–7	(gold) Winner
1935	Scottish Open	(England) Raymond M. White	(England) Kenneth Davidson (England) Alan Titherley	15–10, 15–7	(gold) Winner
1935	All England Open	(England) Raymond M. White	(England) Leslie Nichols (England) Ralph Nichols	15–12, 15–13	(gold) Winner
1936	All England Open	(England) Raymond M. White	(England) Leslie Nichols (England) Ralph Nichols	7–15, 2–15	(silver) Runner-up
1937	Scottish Open	(England) Raymond M. White	(Republic of Ireland) Ian Maconachie (England) Ralph Nichols	15–8, 9–15, 7–15	(silver) Runner-up
1937	All England Open	(England) Raymond M. White	(England) Leslie Nichols (England) Ralph Nichols	6–15, 14–18	(silver) Runner-up

Mixed doubles

Year	Tournament	Partner	Opponent	Score	Result
1929	Welsh International	(Wales) B. Neville	(England) Thomas P. Dick (England) Hazel Hogarth	3–15, 11–15	(silver) Runner-up
1931	Scottish Open	(Scotland) M. K. King Clark	(England) Thomas P. Dick (England) Marian Horsley	15–17, 15–18	(silver) Runner-up
1932	Irish Open	(England) Betty Uber	(England) Raymond M. White (England) Alice Woodroffe	15–5, 15–8	(gold) Winner
1933	Scottish Open	(England) Betty Uber	(England) Alan Titherley (Scotland) C. T. Duncan	15–8, 15–8	(gold) Winner
1933	All England Open	(England) Betty Uber	(Republic of Ireland) Willoughby Hamilton (England) Marian Horsley	18–15, 15–4	(gold) Winner
1933	Welsh International	(England) Betty Uber	(Republic of Ireland) Ian Maconachie (England) Marian Horsley	15–12, 15–12	(gold) Winner
1934	Irish Open	(England) Betty Uber	(Republic of Ireland) Ian Maconachie (England) Marian Horsley	15–12, 15–8	(gold) Winner
1934	All England Open	(England) Betty Uber	(Republic of Ireland) Ian Maconachie (England) Marian Horsley	15–12, 15–10	(gold) Winner
1935	Scottish Open	(England) Betty Uber	(England) Raymond M. White (Scotland) Marian Armstrong	15–6, 15–3	(gold) Winner
1935	All England Open	(England) Betty Uber	(England) Raymond M. White (Scotland) Marian Armstrong	15–3, 15–1	(gold) Winner
1936	Irish Open	(England) Betty Uber	(Republic of Ireland) Ian Maconachie (England) Marian Horsley	15–4, 15–6	(gold) Winner
1936	All England Open	(England) Betty Uber	(Republic of Ireland) Ian Maconachie (England) Thelma Kingsbury	18–15, 15–8	(gold) Winner
1937	Scottish Open	(England) Betty Uber	(Republic of Ireland) Ian Maconachie (England) Thelma Kingsbury	6–15, 11–15	(silver) Runner-up
