= 1934 All England Badminton Championships =

Tournament information
- Sport: Badminton
- Location: Royal Horticultural Halls, Westminster, England, United Kingdom
- Dates: March 6–March 10, 1934
- Established: 1899
- Website: All England Championships

The 1934 All England Championships was a badminton tournament held at the Royal Horticultural Halls, Westminster, England from March 6 to March 10, 1934.

== Final results ==
Category	Winners	Runners-up	Score
Men's singles	(England) Ralph Nichols	(England) Thomas P. Dick	15-11, 15–8
Women's singles	(England) Leoni Kingsbury	(England) Thelma Kingsbury	11–4, 11-6
Men's doubles	(England) Raymond White & Donald Hume	(England) Ralph Nichols & Leslie Nichols	15-12, 12-15, 15-7
Women's doubles	(England) Thelma Kingsbury & Marje Henderson	(Wales) L W Myers & (England) Brenda Speaight	15-8, 15–5
Mixed doubles	(England) Donald Hume & Betty Uber	(Republic of Ireland) Ian Maconachie & (England) Marian Horsley	15-12, 15-10

=== Results ===
==== Men's singles ====
Second round
(England) Ralph Nichols	15	15
(England) F C Sharp	7	6
(Republic of Ireland) Ian Maconachie	15	6	15
(England) S C Minard	7	15	4
(England) Raymond White	15	15
(England) A J Wilson	4	1
(England) C H Whittaker	15	15
(England) H Morland	11	4
(England) Thomas P. Dick	15	15
(South Africa) Gerald Sherwell	2	3
(England) Leslie Nichols	15	15
(England) Albert Harbot	6	3
(England) Donald Hume	15	15
(England) C S M Davidson	3	2
(England) H E Baldwin	15	15
(England) Alan Titherley	11	13

Quarterfinals
(England) Nichols R	14	18
(Republic of Ireland) Maconachie	4	13
(England) White	15	15
(England) Whittaker	6	4
(England) Dick	15	15
(England) Nichols L	12	5
(England) Hume	15	15
(England) Baldwin	5	8

Semifinals
(England) Nichols R	15	15
(England) White	5	12
(England) Dick	15	15
(England) Hume	10	12

Final
(England) Nichols	15	15
(England) Dick	11	8

==== Women's singles ====
Second round
(England) Leoni Kingsbury
(England) C D Newitt
(England) Nora Coop
(England) D Kenny
(England) Thelma Kingsbury
(England) Diana Doveton
(England) Betty Uber
(England) Queenie Allen

Quarterfinals
(England) Kingsbury L	11	11
(England) Newitt	1	5
(England) Coop	11	11
(England) Kenny	6	5
(England) Kingsbury T	11	11
(England) Doveton	2	9
(England) Uber	11	11
(England) Allen	4	4

Semifinals
(England) Kingsbury L	11	11
(England) Coop	1	6
(England) Kingsbury T	11	11
(England) Uber	8	7

Final
(England) Kingsbury L	11	11
(England) Kingsbury T	4	6
