= Brenda Speaight =

English badminton player

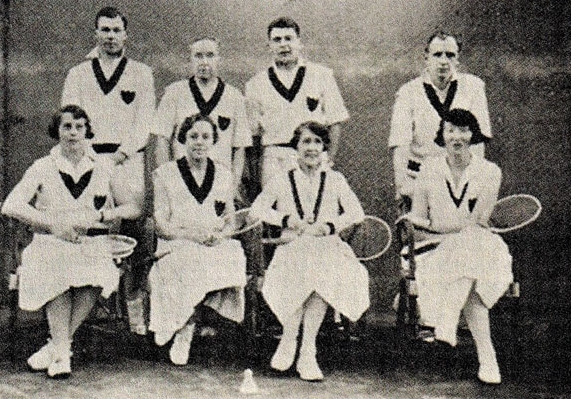

Personal information
- Born: 19 October 1906 Finchley
- Died: 1989 (aged 82–83) Gravesend

Sport
- Country: England
- Sport: Badminton

Brenda Ethel Speaight married name Brenda Singer (1906-1989) was an English international badminton player.

== Badminton career ==
Brenda born in 1906 was the runner-up in three consecutive women's doubles at the 1932 All England Badminton Championships, 1933 All England Badminton Championships and 1934 All England Badminton Championships. She represented Middlesex and England.
