= Ralph Nichols =

English badminton player

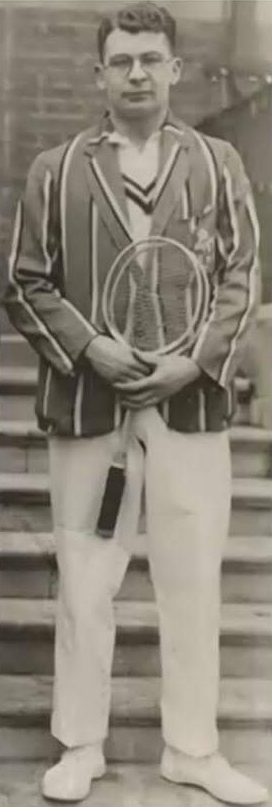
- Ralph Nichols in 1933

Personal information
- Born: 12 August 1910 Islington
- Died: 27 May 2001 (aged 90)

Sport
- Country: England
- Sport: Badminton
- Handedness: Right

Ralph Cyril Fulford Nichols (12 August 1910 – 27 May 2001) was an English male international badminton player.

== Badminton career ==
Nichols won 9 All England Open Badminton Championships titles between 1932 and 1939, 5 of them in men's singles, 3 in men's doubles with his older brother Leslie Nichols and 1 in mixed doubles, and is the last Englishman to win the All England Open in men's singles (1938). He also won three Irish Championships.

He was part of the English touring team that visited Canada during 1930. A match was held at the Granite Club in Toronto which England won 7–2.

Nichols was included in the Badminton Hall of Fame in 1997.

== Achievements ==
=== International tournaments (27 titles, 15 runners-up) ===
Men's singles
Year	Tournament	Opponent	Score	Result
1932	All England Open	(England) Raymond M. White	5–15, 15–11, 18–16	(gold) Winner
1934	All England Open	(England) Thomas P. Dick	15–11, 15–8	(gold) Winner
1935	All England Open	(England) Raymond M. White	10–15, 7–15	(silver) Runner-up
1935	French Open	(Republic of Ireland) Ian Maconachie	15–8, 16–18, 15–10	(gold) Winner
1936	Irish Open	(Republic of Ireland) James Rankin	15–11, 15–7	(gold) Winner
1936	All England Open	(England) Raymond M. White	18–16, 17–18, 15–10	(gold) Winner
1937	Scottish Open	(England) Thomas P. Dick	13–15, 15–14, 15–11	(gold) Winner
1937	All England Open	(England) Thomas P. Dick	15–8, 15–7	(gold) Winner
1938	All England Open	(Denmark) Jesper Bie	15–4, 15–5	(gold) Winner
1939	Scottish Open	(England) Maurice Field	15–9, 15–17, 15–7	(gold) Winner
1939	All England Open	(Denmark) Tage Madsen	15–10, 13–18, 7–15	(silver) Runner-up
1939	Denmark Open	(Denmark) Tage Madsen	10–15, 9–15	(silver) Runner-up
1947	Scottish Open	(England) Noel B. Radford	8–15, 16–18	(silver) Runner-up

Men's doubles
Year	Tournament	Partner	Opponent	Score	Result
1929	Welsh International	(England) Donald C. Hume	(Republic of Ireland) Arthur Hamilton (Republic of Ireland) Willoughby Hamilton	15–12, 15–7	(gold) Winner
1931	Welsh International	(England) Leslie Nichols	(Republic of Ireland) Arthur Hamilton (Republic of Ireland) Willoughby Hamilton	15–8, 12–15, 2–15	(silver) Runner-up
1932	Irish Open	(England) Donald C. Hume	(England) Thomas P. Dick (England) Raymond M. White	15–11, 8–15, 15–2	(gold) Winner
1932	All England Open	(England) Leslie Nichols	(England) Donald C. Hume (England) Raymond M. White	15–14, 16–18, 4–15	(silver) Runner-up
1934	Irish Open	(England) Donald C. Hume	(Republic of Ireland) Ian Maconachie (Republic of Ireland) Willoughby Hamilton	9–15, 15–12, 5–15	(silver) Runner-up
1934	All England Open	(England) Leslie Nichols	(England) Donald C. Hume (England) Raymond M. White	12–15, 15–12, 7–15	(silver) Runner-up
1935	All England Open	(England) Leslie Nichols	(England) Donald C. Hume (England) Raymond M. White	12–15, 13–15	(silver) Runner-up
1935	French Open	(England) Geoffrey J. Fish	(Scotland) F. L. Treasure (England) Alan Titherley	15–2, 15–18, 15–9	(gold) Winner
1936	All England Open	(England) Leslie Nichols	(England) Donald C. Hume (England) Raymond M. White	15–7, 15–2	(gold) Winner
1937	Scottish Open	(Republic of Ireland) Ian Maconachie	(England) Donald C. Hume (England) Raymond M. White	8–15, 15–9, 15–7	(gold) Winner
1937	All England Open	(England) Leslie Nichols	(England) Donald C. Hume (England) Raymond M. White	15–6, 18–14	(gold) Winner
1938	All England Open	(England) Leslie Nichols	(Republic of Ireland) Ian Maconachie (England) Raymond M. White	15–12, 7–15, 15–9	(gold) Winner
1939	All England Open	(England) Leslie Nichols	(Republic of Ireland) Thomas Boyle (Republic of Ireland) James Rankin	4–15, 3–15	(silver) Runner-up
1939	Denmark Open	(England) Raymond M. White	(Denmark) Carl Frøhlke (Denmark) Tage Madsen	15–6, 15–3	(gold) Winner
1947	Scottish Open	(Republic of Ireland) Ian Maconachie	(England) Noel B. Radford (Scotland) W. F. G. Normand	15–6, 15–4	(gold) Winner
1949	French Open	(England) Geoffrey J. Fish	(Malaysia) Foo Sun Lau (Malaysia) Yat Sun Lau	3–15, 12–15	(silver) Runner-up
1950	Scottish Open	(England) Barron Renton	(England) Warwick Shute (England) Tom Wingfield	15–4, 15–7	(gold) Winner
1954	French Open	(England) Geoffrey J. Fish	(France) Pierre Lenoir (France) Ghislain Vasseur	15–6, 15–6	(gold) Winner

Mixed doubles
Year	Tournament	Partner	Opponent	Score	Result
1931	Welsh International	(England) Nora Coop	(England) Leslie Nichols (England) Hazel Hogarth	15–8, 18–15	(gold) Winner
1932	Welsh International	(England) Nora Coop	(England) Thomas P. Dick (England) Hazel Hogarth	3–15, 15–1, 12–15	(silver) Runner-up
1935	French Open	(England) Diana Doveton	(England) Geoffrey J. Fish (England) Betty Uber	15–11, 15–10	(gold) Winner
1937	All England Open	(Scotland) J. W. Stewart	(Republic of Ireland) Ian Maconachie (England) Thelma Kingsbury	11–15, 12–15	(silver) Runner-up
1938	All England Open	(England) Bessie Staples	(England) Raymond M. White (England) Betty Uber	10–15, 9–15	(silver) Runner-up
1939	All England Open	(England) Bessie Staples	(Republic of Ireland) James Rankin (Republic of Ireland) Mavis Macnaughton	15–10, 6–15, 15–8	(gold) Winner
1939	Denmark Open	(England) Bessie Staples	(England) Raymond M. White (England) Diana Doveton	17–14, 15–7	(gold) Winner
1947	Scottish Open	(England) Bessie Shearlaw	(Scotland) J. S. Millar (Scotland) Elizabeth Armstrong	15–7, 15–5	(gold) Winner
1947	Irish Open	(England) Bessie Shearlaw	(Republic of Ireland) Thomas Boyle (Republic of Ireland) W. Swann	15–8, 15–3	(gold) Winner
1949	French Open	(England) Mavis Henderson	(Malaysia) David Choong (Denmark) Anne Lehmeier	12–15, 11–15	(silver) Runner-up
1954	French Open	(England) Elisabeth O'Beirne	(France) Henri Pellizza (France) Noëlle Ailloud	15–4, 15–8	(gold) Winner

== Summary ==
Rank	Event	Date	Venue
1	Men's singles	1932, 1934, 1936, 1937, 1938	All England Open
1	Men's doubles	1936, 1937, 1938	All England Open
1	Mixed doubles	1939	All England Open
1	Men's singles	1937, 1939	Scottish Open
1	Men's doubles	1937, 1947, 1950	Scottish Open
1	Mixed doubles	1947	Scottish Open
1	Men's singles	1936	Irish Championships
1	Men's doubles	1932	Irish Championships
1	Mixed doubles	1947	Irish Championships
1	Men's doubles	1939	Denmark Open
1	Mixed doubles	1939	Denmark Open
1	Men's singles	1935	French Open
1	Men's doubles	1935, 1954	French Open
1	Mixed doubles	1935, 1954	French Open
1	Men's doubles	1929	Welsh Open
1	Mixed doubles	1931	Welsh Open
