= Marian Horsley =

English badminton player

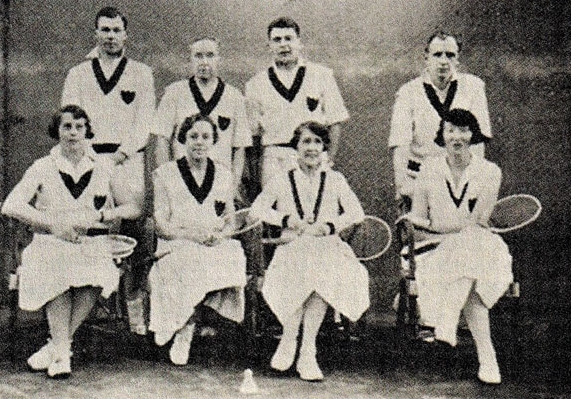

Personal information
- Born: 23 May 1893 Ealing
- Died: 15 Jan 1958 (aged 64) Reading

Sport
- Country: England
- Sport: Badminton

Marian Horsley née Edith Marian Bagshaw Mann (1893-1958) was an English badminton player. She came to prominence whilst still at school and with a reputation as a fitness fanatic gained 24 England caps. She competed in the All England Championships winning two titles in 1929 and 1931. Twenty years later she won the Berks, Bucks and Oxon title four times, the last aged 60.

She married Reginald John Horsley in 1916 and played as Mrs Horsley afterwards.

== Medal Record at the All England Badminton Championships ==
Medal	Year	Event
Silver medal – second place	1923	Women's singles
Silver medal – second place	1926	Women's doubles
Gold medal – first place	1929	Mixed doubles
Silver medal – second place	1929	Women's doubles
Silver medal – second place	1930	Women's doubles
Gold medal – first place	1931	Women's doubles
Silver medal – second place	1931	Mixed doubles
Silver medal – second place	1933	Mixed doubles
Silver medal – second place	1934	Mixed doubles
Silver medal – second place	1938	Women's doubles
