= List of All England women's doubles champions =

All England Open Badminton Championships Ladies' Doubles Champions
- Location: Birmingham; United Kingdom
- Venue: Utilita Arena Birmingham
- Governing body: NEC Group
- Created: 1899
- Editions: Total: 124; Open era (since 1980): 45
- Prize money: $107,300 (2025)
- Trophy: Ladies' Doubles Trophy
- Website: allenglandbadminton.com

Most titles
- Amateur era: 10: Meriel Lucas
- Open era: 6: Gao Ling; 6: Huang Sui

Most consecutive titles
- Amateur era: 7: Meriel Lucas
- Open era: 6: Gao Ling; 6: Huang Sui

Current champion
- Liu Shengshu; Tan Ning – 2026 (1st title)

The champions and runners-up of the All England Open Badminton Championships Ladies' Doubles tournament, first introduced to the championship in 1899. From 1915 to 1919, and from 1940 to 1946, no competition was held due to the two World Wars.

== History ==
In the Amateur era, Meriel Lucas (1899-1900, 1902, 1904-1910) holds the record for the most titles in the Ladies' Doubles, winning All England ten times. Lucas also holds the record for most consecutive titles with seven from 1904 to 1910.

Since the Open era of badminton began in late 1979 with the inclusion of professional badminton players from around the world in 1980, Gao Ling and Huang Sui (2001-2006) holds the record for most and also consecutive victories with six.

Gillian Perrin, Nora Gardner, Atsuko Tokuda, Yoshiko Yonekura and Verawaty Fadjrin are the only players in history to reach the All England Open Badminton Ladies' Doubles Final in both the Amateur and Open Era. Perrin managed to do so a total of seven times, winning twice in the Amateur Era and once in the Open Era, Gardner four, winning twice in the Open Era, Tokuda thrice, with a sole victory in the Amateur Era and both Yonekura and Fadjrin twice, with Fadjrin registering a victory in the Amateur Era.

== Finalists ==
=== Amateur era ===
Year	Champions	Runners–up	Score
1899	(England) Meriel Lucas / Mary Graeme	(England) Ethel Thomson / I. Theobald	18–17, 15–5
1900	(England) Meriel Lucas / Mary Graeme	(England) Ethel Thomson / I. Theobald	15–9, 5–15, 15–2
1901	(England) Daisy St. John / E. Moseley	(England) Meriel Lucas / Mary Graeme	15–0, 15–5
1902	(England) Ethel Thomson / Meriel Lucas	(England) E. Moseley / Daisy St. John	18–17, 9–15, 15–9
1903	(England) Mabel Hardy / Dorothea Douglass	(England) Ethel Thomson / Muriel Bateman	15–4, 15–9
1904	(England) Ethel Thomson / Meriel Lucas	(England) Hazel Hogarth / M. Drake	15–2, 15–5
1905	(England) Ethel Thomson / Meriel Lucas	(England) Mabel Hardy / Dora Harvey	15–3, 15–6
1906	(England) Ethel Thomson / Meriel Lucas	(England) Muriel Bateman / Hazel Hogarth	15–10, 15–5
1907	(England) G. L. Murray / Meriel Lucas	(England) Alice Gowenlock / Dorothy Cundall	15–9, 15–9
1908	(England) G. L. Murray / Meriel Lucas	(England) Alice Gowenlock / Dorothy Cundall	15–4, 15–5
1909	(England) G. L. Murray / Meriel Lucas	(England) Alice Gowenlock / Dorothy Cundall	15–3, 9–15, 15–6
1910	(England) Muriel Bateman / Meriel Lucas	(England) Dorothea Lambert-Chambers (Note: Dorothea Lambert Chambers was formerly known as Dorothea Douglass, married 1907) / Dorothy Lyon	15–8, 15–8
1911	(England) Alice Gowenlock / Dorothy Cundall	(England) Margaret Larminie / Lavinia Radeglia	15–12, 11–15, 15–12
1912	(England) Alice Gowenlock / Dorothy Cundall	Constance Ireland / (England) Frances Drake	15–2, 15–5
1913	(England) Hazel Hogarth / Muriel Bateman	(England) Marjory East / (Ireland) C Johnstone	18–15, 15–4
1914	(England) Margaret Tragett (Note: Margaret Tragett was formerly known as Margaret Larminie, married 1911) / Eveline Peterson	(England) Alice Gowenlock / Lavinia Radeglia	15–4, 16–18, 17–15
1915–1919	no competition		
1920	(England) Lavinia Radeglia / Violet Elton	(England) D Harvey / Mrs Reynolds (Note: Mrs Reynolds was an assumed name)	17–15, 5–15, 15–10
1921	(England) Margaret McKane / Kitty McKane	(England) Violet Elton / Lavinia Radeglia	15–8, 15–11
1922	(England) Margaret Tragett / Hazel Hogarth	(Republic of Ireland) A. M. Head / (England) Violet Baddeley	15–11, 15–9
1923	(England) Margaret Tragett / Hazel Hogarth	(England) Violet Elton / Lavinia Radeglia	15–3, 18–15
1924	(England) Margaret Stocks (Note: Margaret Stocks was formerly known as Margaret McKane, married 1922) / Kitty McKane	(Republic of Ireland) A. M. Head / (England) Violet Elton	15–3, 15–13
1925	(England) Margaret Tragett / Hazel Hogarth	(Republic of Ireland) A. M. Head / (England) Violet Elton	15–11, 15–9
1926	(Republic of Ireland) A. M. Head / (England) Violet Elton	(England) Marjorie Barrett (Note: Marjorie Barrett was formerly known as Marjory East, married 1915) / Marian Horsley	15–9, 15–10
1927	(England) Margaret Tragett / Hazel Hogarth	(England) Violet Baddeley / (Wales) D. Myers	5–15, 18–16, 15–8
1928	(England) Marjorie Barrett / Violet Elton	(England) Margaret Tragett / Hazel Hogarth	5–15, 18–16, 15–8
1929	(England) Marjorie Barrett / Violet Elton	(England) Marian Horsley / (Republic of Ireland) Dorothy Colpoys	15–13, 15–3
1930	(England) Marjorie Barrett / Violet Elton	(England) Marian Horsley / (Republic of Ireland) Dorothy Colpoys	15–1, 15–11
1931	(England) Marian Horsley / Betty Uber	(England) Marjorie Barrett / Violet Elton	12–15, 15–10, 15–5
1932	(England) Marjorie Barrett / Leoni Kingsbury	(Wales) L. W. Myers / (England) Brenda Speaight	9–15, 18–16, 15–8
1933	(England) Marje Bell / Thelma Kingsbury	(Wales) L. W. Myers / (England) Brenda Speaight	10–15, 15–11, 15–9
1934	(England) Marje Henderson (Note: Marje Henderson was formerly known as Marje Bell, married in 1933) / Thelma Kingsbury	(Wales) L. W. Myers / (England) Brenda Speaight	15–8, 15–5
1935	(England) Marje Henderson / Thelma Kingsbury	(England) Betty Uber / Diana Doveton	15–5, 9–15, 15–8
1936	(England) Marje Henderson / Thelma Kingsbury	(England) Betty Uber / Diana Doveton	15–10, 5–15, 15–7
1937	(England) Betty Uber / Diana Doveton	(England) Marje Henderson / Thelma Kingsbury	17–18, 15–1, 15–2
1938	(England) Betty Uber / Diana Doveton	(England) Marje Henderson / Marian Horsley	15–6, 15–1
1939	(Denmark) Ruth Dalsgaard / Tonny Olsen	(England) Marjorie Barrett / Diana Doveton	15–11, 2–15, 17–15
1940–1946	no competition		
1947	(Denmark) Tonny Ahm (Note: Tonny Ahm was formerly known as Tonny Olsen) / Kirsten Thorndahl	(Denmark) Aase Schiøtt Jacobsen / Marie Ussing	15–8, 15–7
1948	(Denmark) Tonny Ahm / Kirsten Thorndahl	(England) Betty Uber / Queenie Allen	15–6, 12–15, 15–2
1949	(England) Betty Uber / Queenie Allen	(Denmark) Tonny Ahm / Kirsten Thorndahl	16–17, 15–5, 15–8
1950	(Denmark) Tonny Ahm / Kirsten Thorndahl	(England) Betty Uber / Queenie Allen	16–17, 15–5, 15–8
1951	(Denmark) Tonny Ahm / Kirsten Thorndahl	(England) Marje Henderson / Queenie Webber	17–15, 15–7
1952	(Denmark) Tonny Ahm / Aase Schiøtt Jacobsen	(England) Betty Uber / Queenie Webber	18–15, 15–4
1953	(England) Iris Cooley / June White	(Denmark) Agnete Friis / Marie Ussing	11–15, 15–2, 15–9
1954	(England) Sue Devlin / Judy Devlin	(England) Iris Cooley / June White	15–7, 12–15, 15–8
1955	(England) Iris Cooley / June White	(England) Sue Devlin / Judy Devlin	18–15, 10–15, 15–9
1956	(United States) Sue Devlin / Judy Devlin	(England) Iris Rogers (Note: Iris Rogers was formerly known as Iris Cooley, married in 1956) / June Timperley (Note: June Timperley was formerly known as June White, married in 1955)	17–18, 15–12, 15–12
1957	(Denmark) Anni Hammergaard Hansen / Kirsten Thorndahl	(England) Iris Rogers / June Timperley	7–15, 15–11, 15–10
1958	(United States) Margaret Varner / (England) Heather Ward	(England) Iris Rogers / June Timperley	15–12, 15–2
1959	(England) Iris Rogers / June Timperley	(England) Sue Devlin / Judy Devlin	11–15, 15–10, 15–11
1960	(United States) Sue Devlin / Judy Devlin	(Denmark) Kirsten Thorndahl / Inge Birgit Hansen	15–13, 15–6
1961	(United States) Judy Hashman (Note: Judy Hashman was formerly known as Judy Devlin, married in 1960) / (Republic of Ireland) Sue Peard (Note: Sue Peard was formerly known as Sue Devlin)	(Scotland) Cathy E. Dunglison / Wilma Tyre	15–5, 15–4
1962	(United States) Judy Hashman / (Denmark) Tonny Holst-Christensen	(Denmark) Karin Jørgensen / Ulla Rasmussen	15–5, 15–3
1963	(United States) Judy Hashman / (Republic of Ireland) Sue Peard	(Denmark) Karin Jørgensen / Ulla Rasmussen	15–6, 15–9
1964	(Denmark) Karin Jørgensen / Ulla Rasmussen	(United States) Judy Hashman / (Republic of Ireland) Sue Peard	15–11, 6–15, 15–10
1965	(Denmark) Karin Jørgensen / Ulla Rasmussen	(England) Jenny Pritchard / Ursula Smith	15–5, 15–0
1966	(United States) Judy Hashman / (Republic of Ireland) Sue Peard	(Denmark) Karin Jørgensen / Ulla Strand (Note: Ulla Strand was formerly known as Ulla Rasmussen)	15–5, 14–17, 15–12
1967	(Netherlands) Imre Rietveld / (Denmark) Ulla Strand	(England) Janet Brennan / (United States) Judy Hashman	11–15, 15–8, 15–4
1968	(Indonesia) Minarni Sudaryanto / Retno Koestijah	(Japan) Noriko Takagi / Hiroe Amano	15–5, 15–6
1969	(England) Margaret Boxall / Susan Whetnall	(Japan) Hiroe Amano / Tomoko Takahashi	15–11, 15–11
1970	(England) Margaret Boxall / Susan Whetnall	(England) Gillian Perrin / Julie Rickard	15–6, 8–15, 15–9
1971	(Japan) Noriko Takagi / Hiroe Yuki	(England) Gillian Gilks (Note: Gillian Gilks was formerly known as Gillian Perrin, married in 1970) / (United States) Judy Hashman	15–10, 18–13
1972	(Japan) Machiko Aizawa / Etsuko Takenaka	(England) Margaret Beck / Julie Rickard	9–15, 15–8, 15–12
1973	(Japan) Machiko Aizawa / Etsuko Takenaka	(England) Margaret Beck / Gillian Gilks	15–10, 10–15, 15–11
1974	(England) Margaret Beck / Gillian Gilks	(England) Margaret Boxall / Susan Whetnall	15–5, 18–14
1975	(Japan) Machiko Aizawa / Etsuko Takenaka	(Indonesia) Theresia Widiastuti / Imelda Wiguna	12–15, 15–12, 15–9
1976	(England) Gillian Gilks / Susan Whetnall	(England) Margaret Lockwood / Nora Gardner	15–10, 15–10
1977	(Japan) Etsuko Toganoo / Emiko Ueno	(England) Margaret Lockwood / Nora Perry (Note: Nora Perry was formerly known as Nora Gardner, married in 1976)	7–15, 15–3, 15–7
1978	(Japan) Atsuko Tokuda / Mikiko Takada	(Japan) Emiko Ueno / Yoshiko Yonekura	18–16, 15–6
1979	(Indonesia) Verawaty Fadjrin / Imelda Wiguna	(Japan) Atsuko Tokuda / Mikiko Takada	15–3, 10–15, 15–5

=== Open era ===
Year	Country	Champions	Country	Runners–up	Score
1980	ENG; ENG	Gillian Gilks; Nora Perry	JPN; JPN	Atsuko Tokuda; Yoshiko Yonekura	11–15, 15–7, 15–6
1981	ENG; ENG	Nora Perry; Jane Webster	ENG; ENG	Gillian Gilks; Paula Kilvington	15–8, 15–4
1982	CHN; CHN	Ying Lin; Dixi Wu	INA; INA	Ruth Damayanti; Verawaty Fadjrin	15–8, 15–5
1983	CHN; CHN	Jianqiu Wu; Rong Xu	CHN; CHN	Ying Lin; Dixi Wu	15–9, 15–11
1984	CHN; CHN	Ying Lin; Dixi Wu	KOR; KOR	Yun-ja Kim; Sang-hee Yoo	15–8, 8–15, 17–14
1985	CHN; CHN	Aiping Han; Lingwei Li	CHN; CHN	Weizhen Guan; Jianqiu Wu	15–7, 15–9
1986	KOR; KOR	Myung-hee Chung; Hye-young Hwang	KOR; KOR	Yun-ja Kim; Sang-hee Yoo	15–5, 6–15, 15–8
1987	KOR; KOR	Myung-hee Chung; Hye-young Hwang	CHN; CHN	Weizhen Guan; Ying Lin	15–6, 8–15, 15–11
1988	KOR; KOR	So-young Chung; Yun-ja Kim	KOR; KOR	Myung-hee Chung; Hye-young Hwang	15–8, 9–15 (retired)
1989	KOR; KOR	Myung-hee Chung; So-young Chung	CHN; CHN	Xiaoqing Sun; Lei Zhou	15–7, 15–4
1990	KOR; KOR	Myung-hee Chung; Hye-young Hwang	ENG; ENG	Gillian Clark; Gillian Gowers	6–15, 15–4, 15–4
1991	KOR; KOR	So-young Chung; Hye-young Hwang	JPN; JPN	Kimiko Jinnai; Hisako Mori	15–5, 15–3
1992	CHN; CHN	Yanfen Lin; Fen Yao	CHN; CHN	Weizhen Guan; Qunhua Nong	18–14, 18–17
1993	KOR; KOR	So-young Chung; Young-ah Gil	CHN; CHN	Fen Yao; Yanfen Lin	5–15, 15–4, 15–7
1994	KOR; KOR	So-young Chung; Young-ah Gil	KOR; KOR	Hye-ock Jang; Eun-jung Shim	7–15, 15–8, 15–4
1995	KOR; KOR	Young-ah Gil; Hye-ock Jang	INA; INA	Eliza Nathanael; Resiana Zelin	15–6, 15–3
1996	CHN; CHN	Fei Ge; Jun Gu	DEN; DEN	Helene Kirkegaard; Rikke Olsen	15–7, 15–3
1997	CHN; CHN	Fei Ge; Jun Gu	INA; INA	Eliza Nathanael; Resiana Zelin	15–6, 15–9
1998	CHN; CHN	Fei Ge; Jun Gu	KOR; KOR	Hye-ock Jang; Kyung-min Ra	15–7, 15–7
1999	KOR; KOR	Jae-hee Chung; Kyung-min Ra	CHN; CHN	Sui Huang; Ying Lu	15–6, 15–8
2000	CHN; CHN	Fei Ge; Jun Gu	KOR; KOR	Jae-hee Chung; Kyung-min Ra	15–5, 15–3
2001	CHN; CHN	Ling Gao; Sui Huang	CHN; CHN	Yili Wei; Jiewen Zhang	10–15, 15–8, 15–9
2002	CHN; CHN	Ling Gao; Sui Huang	CHN; CHN	Yili Wei; Jiewen Zhang	7–3, 7–5, 8–7
2003	CHN; CHN	Ling Gao; Sui Huang	CHN; CHN	Wei Yang; Jiewen Zhang	15–10, 15–13
2004	CHN; CHN	Ling Gao; Sui Huang	CHN; CHN	Wei Yang; Jiewen Zhang	Walkover
2005	CHN; CHN	Ling Gao; Sui Huang	CHN; CHN	Yili Wei; Tingting Zhao	15–10, 15–13
2006	CHN; CHN	Ling Gao; Sui Huang	CHN; CHN	Wei Yang; Jiewen Zhang	6–15, 15–11, 15–2
2007	CHN; CHN	Yili Wei; Yawen Zhang	CHN; CHN	Wei Yang; Jiewen Zhang	21–16, 8–21, 24–22
2008	KOR; KOR	Hyo-jung Lee; Kyung-won Lee	CHN; CHN	Jing Du; Yang Yu	12–21, 21–18, 21–14
2009	CHN; CHN	Yawen Zhang; Tingting Zhao	CHN; CHN	Shu Cheng; Yunlei Zhao	21–13, 21–15
2010	CHN; CHN	Jing Du; Yang Yu	CHN; CHN	Shu Cheng; Yunlei Zhao	20–22, 21–16, 21–13
2011	CHN; CHN	Xiaoli Wang; Yang Yu	JPN; JPN	Mizuki Fujii; Reika Kakiiwa	21–2, 21–9
2012	CHN; CHN	Qing Tian; Yunlei Zhao	CHN; CHN	Xiaoli Wang; Yang Yu	21–17, 21–12
2013	CHN; CHN	Xiaoli Wang; Yang Yu	CHN; CHN	Shu Cheng; Yunlei Zhao	21–18, 21–10
2014	CHN; CHN	Xiaoli Wang; Yang Yu	CHN; CHN	Jin Ma; Yuanting Tang	21–17, 18–21, 23–21
2015	CHN; CHN	Yixin Bao; Yuanting Tang	CHN; CHN	Xiaoli Wang; Yang Yu	21–14, 21–14
2016	JPN; JPN	Misaki Matsutomo; Ayaka Takahashi	CHN; CHN	Yuanting Tang; Yang Yu	21–10, 21–12
2017	KOR; KOR	Ye-na Chang; So-hee Lee	DEN; DEN	Christinna Pedersen; Kamilla Rytter Juhl	21–18, 21–13
2018	DEN; DEN	Christinna Pedersen; Kamilla Rytter Juhl	JPN; JPN	Yuki Fukushima; Sayaka Hirota	21–19, 21–18
2019	CHN; CHN	Qingchen Chen; Yifan Jia	JPN; JPN	Mayu Matsumoto; Wakana Nagahara	18–21, 22–20, 21–11
2020	JPN; JPN	Yuki Fukushima; Sayaka Hirota	CHN; CHN	Yue Du; Yinhui Li	21–13, 21–15
2021	JPN; JPN	Mayu Matsumoto; Wakana Nagahara	JPN; JPN	Yuki Fukushima; Sayaka Hirota	21–18, 21–16
2022	JPN; JPN	Nami Matsuyama; Chiharu Shida	CHN; CHN	Shuxian Zhang; Yu Zheng	21–13, 21–9
2023	KOR; KOR	So-yeong Kim; Hee-yong Kong	KOR; KOR	Ha-na Baek; So-hee Lee	21–5, 21–12
2024	KOR; KOR	Ha-na Baek; So-hee Lee	JPN; JPN	Nami Matsuyama; Chiharu Shida	21–19, 11–21, 21–17
2025	JPN; JPN	Nami Matsuyama; Chiharu Shida	JPN; JPN	Yuki Fukushima; Mayu Matsumoto	21–16, 14–21, 21–17
2026	CHN; CHN	Shengshu Liu; Ning Tan	KOR; KOR	Ha-na Baek; So-hee Lee	21–18, 21–12

== Statistics ==
=== Multiple titles ===
Bold indicates active players.

Rank	Country	Player	Amateur era	Open era	All-time	Years
1	ENG	Meriel Lucas	10	0	10	1899, 1900, 1902, 1904, 1905, 1906, 1907, 1908, 1909, 1910
2	ENG; USA	Judy Devlin	7	0	7	1954, 1956, 1960, 1961, 1962, 1963, 1966
3	DEN	Tonny Olsen	6	0	6	1939, 1947, 1948, 1950, 1951, 1952
3	USA; IRL	Sue Devlin	6	0	6	1954, 1956, 1960, 1961, 1963, 1966
3	CHN	Ling Gao	0	6	6	2001, 2002, 2003, 2004, 2005, 2006
3	CHN	Sui Huang	0	6	6	2001, 2002, 2003, 2004, 2005, 2006
7	ENG	Hazel Hogarth	5	0	5	1913, 1922, 1923, 1925, 1927
7	ENG	Margaret Tragett	5	0	5	1914, 1922, 1923, 1925, 1927
7	ENG	Violet Elton	5	0	5	1920, 1926, 1928, 1929, 1930
7	DEN	Kirsten Thorndahl	5	0	5	1947, 1948, 1950, 1951, 1957
7	KOR	So-young Chung	0	5	5	1988, 1989, 1991, 1993, 1994
12	ENG	Ethel Thomson	4	0	4	1902, 1904, 1905, 1906
12	ENG	Marjorie Barrett	4	0	4	1928, 1929, 1930, 1932
12	ENG	Betty Uber	4	0	4	1931, 1937, 1938, 1949
12	ENG	Marjorie Bell	4	0	4	1933, 1934, 1935, 1936
12	ENG	Thelma Kingsbury	4	0	4	1933, 1934, 1935, 1936
12	JPN	Etsuko Takenaka	4	0	4	1972, 1973, 1975, 1977
12	KOR	Myung-hee Chung	0	4	4	1986, 1987, 1989, 1990
12	KOR	Hye-young Hwang	0	4	4	1986, 1987, 1990, 1991
12	CHN	Fei Ge	0	4	4	1996, 1997, 1998, 2000
12	CHN	Jun Gu	0	4	4	1996, 1997, 1998, 2000
12	CHN	Yang Yu	0	4	4	2010, 2011, 2013, 2014
23	ENG	G. L. Murray	3	0	3	1907, 1908, 1909
23	ENG	Iris Cooley	3	0	3	1953, 1955, 1959
23	ENG	June White	3	0	3	1953, 1955, 1959
23	DEN	Ulla Rasmussen	3	0	3	1964, 1965, 1967
23	ENG	Sue Pound	3	0	3	1969, 1970, 1976
23	JPN	Machiko Aizawa	3	0	3	1972, 1973, 1975
23	ENG	Gillian Perrin	2	1	3	1974, 1976, 1980
23	KOR	Young-ah Gil	0	3	3	1993, 1994, 1995
23	CHN	Xiaoli Wang	0	3	3	2011, 2013, 2014
32	ENG	Mary Graeme	2	0	2	1899, 1900
32	ENG	Dorothy Cundall	2	0	2	1907, 1909
32	ENG	Alice Gowenlock	2	0	2	1907, 1909
32	ENG	Muriel Bateman	2	0	2	1910, 1913
32	ENG	Kitty McKane	2	0	2	1921, 1924
32	ENG	Margaret Stocks	2	0	2	1921, 1924
32	ENG	Diana Doveton	2	0	2	1937, 1938
32	DEN	Karin Jørgensen	2	0	2	1964, 1965
32	ENG	Margaret Boxall	2	0	2	1969, 1970
32	ENG	Nora Gardner	0	2	2	1980, 1981
32	CHN	Ying Lin	0	2	2	1982, 1984
32	CHN	Dixi Wu	0	2	2	1982, 1984
32	CHN	Yawen Zhang	0	2	2	2007, 2009
32	KOR	**So-hee Lee**	0	2	2	2017, 2024
32	JPN	**Nami Matsuyama**	0	2	2	2022, 2025
32	JPN	**Chiharu Shida**	0	2	2	2022, 2025

=== Champions by country ===
Rank	Country	Amateur era	Open era	All-time	First title	Last title	First champions	Last champions
1	England (ENG)	44.5	2	47	1899	1981	Meriel Lucas; Mary Graeme	Nora Gardner; Jane Webster
2	China (CHN)	0	25	25	1982	2026	Ying Lin; Dixi Wu	Shengshu Liu; Ning Tan
3	South Korea (KOR)	0	14	14	1986	2024	Myung-hee Chung; Hye-young Hwang	Ha-na Baek; So-hee Lee
4	Denmark (DEN)	10	1	11	1939	2018	Ruth Dalsgaard; Tonny Olsen	Christinna Pedersen; Kamilla Rytter Juhl
5	Japan (JPN)	6	3	9	1971	2021	Noriko Takagi; Hiroe Yuki	Mayu Matsumoto; Wakana Nagahara
6	United States (USA)	3.5	0	4.5	1958	1966	Margaret Varner; Heather Ward	Judy Devlin (Republic of Ireland) Sue Devlin
7	Ireland (IRL)	2	0	2	1926	1966	A. M. Head (England) Violet Elton	Sue Devlin (United States) Judy Devlin
7	Indonesia (INA)	2	0	2	1968	1979	Retno Koestijah; Minarni Sudaryanto	Verawaty Fadjrin; Imelda Wiguna
9	Netherlands (NLD)	0.5	0	0.5	1967	1967	Imre Rietveld (Denmark) Ulla Rasmussen	Imre Rietveld (Denmark) Ulla Rasmussen

=== Multiple finalists ===
Bold indicates active players.
Italic indicates players who never won the championship.

Rank	Country	Player	Amateur era	Open era	All-time
1	ENG; USA	Judy Devlin	12	0	12
2	ENG	Meriel Lucas	11	0	11
3	ENG	Violet Elton	10	0	10
4	ENG	Betty Uber	9	0	9
4	ENG; USA; IRL	Sue Devlin	9	0	9
6	ENG	Hazel Hogarth	8	0	8
6	ENG	Marjorie Barrett	8	0	8
6	CHN	Yang Yu	0	8	8
9	ENG	Ethel Thomson	7	0	7
9	ENG	Margaret Tragett	7	0	7
9	ENG	Marjorie Bell	7	0	7
9	DEN	Tonny Olsen	7	0	7
9	DEN	Kirsten Thorndahl	7	0	7
9	ENG	Iris Cooley	7	0	7
9	ENG	June White	7	0	7
9	ENG	Gillian Perrin	5	2	7
9	CHN	Sui Huang	0	7	7
18	ENG	Alice Gowenlock	6	0	6
18	DEN	Ulla Rasmussen	6	0	6
18	CHN	Ling Gao	0	6	6
18	CHN	Jiewen Zhang	0	6	6
22	ENG	Dorothy Cundall	5	0	5
22	ENG	Lavinia Clara Radeglia	5	0	5
22	ENG	Marian Horsley	5	0	5
22	ENG	Thelma Kingsbury	5	0	5
22	ENG	Diana Doveton	5	0	5
22	ENG	Queenie Allen	5	0	5
22	DEN	Karin Jørgensen	5	0	5
22	ENG	Margaret Beck	5	0	5
22	KOR	Myung-hee Chung	0	5	5
22	KOR	Hye-young Hwang	0	5	5
22	KOR	So-young Chung	0	5	5
22	CHN	Xiaoli Wang	0	5	5
34	ENG	Muriel Bateman	4	0	4
34	IRL	A. M. Head	4	0	4
34	ENG	Sue Pound	4	0	4
34	JPN	Etsuko Takenaka	4	0	4
34	ENG	Nora Gardner	2	2	4
34	CHN	Ying Lin	0	4	4
34	CHN	Fei Ge	0	4	4
34	CHN	Jun Gu	0	4	4
34	CHN	Yili Wei	0	4	4
34	CHN	Wei Yang	0	4	4
34	CHN	Yunlei Zhao	0	4	4
34	JPN	**Yuki Fukushima**	0	4	4
34	KOR	**So-hee Lee**	0	4	4
47	ENG	Mary Graeme	3	0	3
47	ENG	G. L. Murray	3	0	3
47	WAL	L. W. Myers	3	0	3
47	ENG	Brenda Speaight	3	0	3
47	ENG	Margaret Boxall	3	0	3
47	JPN	Machiko Aizawa	3	0	3
47	JPN	Atsuko Tokuda	2	1	3
47	CHN	Dixi Wu	0	3	3
47	KOR	Yun-ja Kim	0	3	3
47	CHN	Weizhen Guan	0	3	3
47	KOR	Young-ah Gil	0	3	3
47	KOR	Hye-ock Jang	0	3	3
47	KOR	Kyung-min Ra	0	3	3
47	CHN	Shu Cheng	0	3	3
47	CHN	Yuanting Tang	0	3	3
47	JPN	**Sayaka Hirota**	0	3	3
47	JPN	**Mayu Matsumoto**	0	3	3
47	JPN	**Nami Matsuyama**	0	3	3
47	JPN	**Chiharu Shida**	0	3	3
47	KOR	**Ha-na Baek**	0	3	3
67	ENG	I. Theobald	2	0	2
67	ENG	E. Moseley	2	0	2
67	ENG	Daisy St. John	2	0	2
67	ENG	Dorothea Douglass	2	0	2
67	ENG	Mabel Hardy	2	0	2
67	ENG	Kitty McKane	2	0	2
67	ENG	Margaret Stocks	2	0	2
67	ENG	Violet Baddeley	2	0	2
67	IRL	Dorothy Colpoys	2	0	2
67	DEN	Aase Schiøtt Jacobsen	2	0	2
67	DEN	Marie Ussing	2	0	2
67	JPN	Hiroe Amano	2	0	2
67	JPN	Noriko Takagi	2	0	2
67	ENG	Julie Rickard	2	0	2
67	INA	Imelda Wiguna	2	0	2
67	JPN	Emiko Ueno	2	0	2
67	JPN	Mikiko Takada	2	0	2
67	JPN	Yoshiko Yonekura	1	1	2
67	INA	Verawaty Fadjrin	1	1	2
67	CHN	Jianqiu Wu	0	2	2
67	KOR	Sang-hee Yoo	0	2	2
67	CHN	Yanfen Lin	0	2	2
67	CHN	Fen Yao	0	2	2
67	INA	Eliza Nathanael	0	2	2
67	INA	Resiana Zelin	0	2	2
67	KOR	Jae-hee Chung	0	2	2
67	CHN	Tingting Zhao	0	2	2
67	CHN	Yawen Zhang	0	2	2
67	CHN	Jing Du	0	2	2
67	DEN	Christinna Pedersen	0	2	2
67	DEN	Kamilla Rytter Juhl	0	2	2
67	JPN	**Wakana Nagahara**	0	2	2

== See also ==
- List of All England men's singles champions
- List of All England women's singles champions
- List of All England men's doubles champions
- List of All England mixed doubles champions
