= 1901 All England Badminton Championships =

1901 All England Championships
Tournament details
- Dates: 10 April 1901 – 11 April 1901
- Edition: 3rd
- Venue: Scottish Drill Hall
- Location: Buckingham Gate, Westminster, London
- Official website: All England Championships

The 1901 All England Championships was a badminton tournament held at the Scottish Drill Hall, the headquarters of the London Scottish Rifles at Buckingham Gate, Westminster, London, England from 10–11 April 1901.

The men's and women's singles was first to 11 points (for a game) except the final which was first to 15 points. The holder Sydney Smith was defeated in his first match against the eventual winner H. W. Davies. The 1900 runner-up D. W. Oakes missed the event because he serving with his military regiment in India.

== Final results ==
Category	Winners	Runners-up	Score
Men's singles	(England) H. W. Davies	(England) Ralph Watling	15-9, 15-4
Women's singles	(England) Ethel Thomson	(England) Mina Schreiber	15-12, 15-7
Men's doubles	(England) Herbert Mellersh & F.S.Collier	(England) C. H. Martin & Stewart Massey	17-16, 9-15, 15-5
Women's doubles	(England) Daisy St. John & E. M. Moseley	(England) Meriel Lucas & Mary Graeme	15-0, 15-5
Mixed doubles	(England) F.S.Collier & Ellen Stawell-Brown	(England) Stewart Massey & Mrs Cammell	15-8, 5-15, 18-17
Mixed doubles handicap	(England) E. Young & Mrs Triscott	(England) Stewart Massey & Miss Muriel Bateman	21-15

== Men's singles ==
First round
(England) H. W. Davies (Teignmouth)	11	11
(England) Ormond (Wantage)	3	0
(England) Sydney Smith (Stroud)
bye
(England) George Thomas (Southsea)	11	9	w/o
(England) Percy Buckley (Guildford)	5	11	ret
(England) C. J. Wiltshire (Great Yarmouth)	10	11	11
(England) Leonard Ransford (Crystal Palace)	13	3	6
(England) Herbert Mellersh (Guildford)	11	w/o
(England) Hart (Crystal Palace)	0	ret
(England) Hutton (Whaley Bridge)	11	11
(England) Toker (Bedford)	1	3
(England) A. V. Cowley (Ealing)	11	8	11
(England) Campbell (Southport)	8	11	8
(England) Hamer (Southport)	w/o
(England) Peake (Llangollen)	scr
(England) Ralph Watling (Great Yarmouth)	11	11
(England) Robert Ransford (Crystal Palace)	9	2
(England) Hale (Crystal Palace)	11	7	11
(England) A. B. Clifton (Chelsea)	6	11	4
(England) Pedder (Ealing)	11	11
(England) Loveday (Wantage)	7	3
(England) Richard Stukeley St.John (Ealing)	11	11
(England) Lannowe (Ealing)	3	2
(England) F. S. Collier (Guildford)	11	11
(England) G. O. Robinson (Hersham)	2	6
(England) C. C. Robinson (Hersham)	11	11
(England) W. Wheelwright (Chelsea)	6	1
(England) Hillier (Stowmarket)	3	11	11
(England) E. Young (Blackheath)	11	1	9
(England) F. Rowley (Whaley Bridge)	11	11
(England) Taylor (Ealing)	4	5

Second round
(England) Davies	11	6	11
(England) Smith	3	11	5
(England) Thomas	11	11
(England) Wiltshire	6	6
(England) Mellersh	11	11
(England) Hutton	0	2
(England) Cowley	11	11
(England) Hamer	2	2
(England) Watling	11	11
(England) Hale	1	1
(England) Pedder	11	11
(England) St.John	4	7
(England) Collier	11	11
(England) C Robinson	3	7
(England) Hillier	11	11
(England) Rowley	0	5

Quarter-finals
(England) Davies	11	11
(England) Thomas	2	6
(England) Mellersh	11	8	11
(England) Cowley	1	11	9
(England) Watling	11	11
(England) Pedder	5	0
(England) Collier	11	11
(England) Hillier	5	1

Semi-finals
(England) Davies	11	11
(England) Mellersh	2	0
(England) Watling	11	w/o
(England) Collier	5	ret

Final
(England) Davies	15	15
(England) Watling	9	4

== Women's singles ==
First round
(England) Miss Ethel Thomson (Budleigh Salterton)	w/o
(England) Miss Meriel Lucas (Teignmouth)	scr
(England) Miss Hamer (Southport)
bye
(England) Miss Ormond (Wantage)
bye
(England) Miss I. Theobald (Budleigh Salterton)
bye
(England) Miss Ellen Stawell-Brown (Guildford)
bye
(England) Miss O. Martin (Ealing)
bye
(England) Miss Mabel Hardy (Crystal Palace)
bye
(England) Miss H-Wooler (North Somerset)
bye
(England) Mina Schreiber (Bognor)
bye
(England) Mrs Bowley (Whaley Bridge)
bye
(England) Miss Deare (Wantage)
bye
(England) Miss Maidment (Newcastle)
bye
(England) Miss Daisy St. John (Ealing)
bye
(England) Mary Schreiber (Bognor)
bye
(England) Miss E. M. Moseley (Ealing)
bye
(England) Miss Florence Lannowe (Ealing)
bye

Second round
(England) Thomson	11	11
(England) Hamer	2	1
(England) Ormond	w/o
(England) Theobald	scr
(England) Stawell-Brown	11	11
(England) Martin	9	4
(England) Hardy	11	11
(England) Wooler	0	0
(England) Schreiber	w/o
(England) Bowley	scr
(England) Deare	w/o
(England) Maidment	scr
(England) St.John	11	6	11
(England) Schreiber	3	11	5
(England) E Moseley	11	11
(England) Lannowe	3	8

Quarter-finals
(England) Thomson	11	11
(England) Ormond	0	0
(England) Stawell-Brown	4	11	11
(England) Hardy	11	6	9
(England) Schreiber	11	11
(England) Deare	0	0
(England) St.John	11	11
(England) E Moseley	1	7

Semi-finals
(England) Thomson	11	13
(England) Stawell-Brown	4	11
(England) Schreiber	11	11
(England) St.John	6	4

Final
(England) Thomson	15	15
(England) Schreiber	12	7

== Men's doubles ==
First round
(England) Herbert Mellersh & F. S. Collier (Guildford)	15	15
(England) Loveday & Ormond (Wantage)	0	0
(England) L. Hanson & Robert Ransford (Crystal Palace)	15	15
(England) Campbell & Hamer (Southport)	4	5
(England) E. Young & R. Young (Blackheath)	15	15
(England) F. Rowley & Hall (Whaley Bridge)	6	5
(England) Buckley (Guildford) & Hillier (Stowmarket)	15	9	15
(England) C. C. Robinson & G. V. Robinson (Hersham)	9	15	8
(England) Stewart Massey & C. H. Martin (Ealing)	15	15
(England) A. V. Cowley & Pedder (Ealing)	3	1
(England) George Thomas (Southsea) & Taylor (Ealing)	15	15
(England) Dobree & Abbatt (Ealing)	10	2
(England) Ralph Watling & C.J Wiltshire (Great Yarmouth)	15	17
(England) Sydney Smith (Stroud) & Richard St.John (Ealing)	6	15
(England) J. E. Hart & George Vidal (Norwood)	15	15
(England) Thomas Orme Colles & Hutton (Whaley Bridge)	5	6

Quarter-finals
(England) Mellersh & Collier	15	15
(England) Hanson & Ransford	2	3
(England) E. Young & R. Young	17	15
(England) Buckley & Hillier	15	10
(England) Massey & Martin	15	15
(England) Thomas & Taylor	7	3
(England) Watling & Wiltshire	15	15
(England) Hart & Vidal	10	6

Semi-finals
(England) Mellersh & Collier	17	15
(England) E. Young & R. Young	14	4
(England) Massey & Martin	15	15
(England) Watling & Wiltshire	10	6

Final
(England) Mellersh & Collier	17	9	15
(England) Massey & Martin	16	15	5

== Women's doubles ==
First round
(England) Miss Daisy St. John; Miss E. M. Moseley (Ealing)
bye
(England) Mrs MacMillan & Miss Smythe (North Kensington)
bye
(England) Mrs Ruth Watling (Great Yarmouth) & Miss Burroughs (Southsea)	15	15
(England) Miss C.Brooks & Miss H. Brooks (Hersham)	5	2
(England) Mary Schreiber & Miss Florence Lannowe (Bognor)
(England) bye
(England) Mina Schreiber & Drake (Bognor)
bye
(England) Miss Deare & Miss Ormond (Wantage)
bye
(England) Mrs C. Turner & Miss Quentin (Camberley)
bye
(England) Agnes Maude Colles & Mrs F. Rowley (Whaley Bridge)
bye
(England) Miss Meriel Lucas & Miss Mary Graeme (Teignmouth)
bye
(England) Mrs Collier & Miss M. Bayly (Crystal Palace)
bye
(England) Mrs Murray & Miss Clarke (Cheltenham)
bye
(England) Mrs Campbell & Miss Hamer (Southport)
bye
(England) Miss Ellen Stawell-Brown & Miss Mabel Hardy (Crystal Palace)
bye
(England) Miss Moseley & Miss O. Martin (Ealing)
bye
(England) Miss I. Theobald & Miss Ethel Thomson (Budleigh Salterton)
bye
(England) Mrs Thorn & Mrs Morris (Chelsea)
bye

Second round
(England) St.John & Moseley	15	15
(England) MacMillan & Smythe	0	1
(England) Watling & Burroughs	18	15
(England) Schreiber & Lannowe	15	7
(England) Schreiber & Drake	15	15
(England) Deare & Ormond	0	2
(England) Turner & Quentin	15	15
(England) Rowley & Colles	4	1
(England) Lucas & Graeme	15	15
(England) Collier & Bayly	10	7
(England) Murray & Clarke	15	15
(England) Campbell & Hamer	7	2
(England) Hardy & Stawell-Brown	15	18
(England) Moseley & Martin	10	14
(England) Thomson & Theobald	15	15
(England) Thorn & Morris	1	2

Quarter-finals
(England) St.John & Moseley	15	15
(England) Watling & Burroughs	6	6
(England) Schreiber & Drake	15	15
(England) Turner & Quentin	2	1
(England) Lucas & Graeme	15	15
(England) Murray & Clarke	7	2
(England) Hardy & Stawell-Brown	15	7	15
(England) Thomson & Theobald	10	15	5

Semi-finals
(England) St.John & Moseley	15	15
(England) Schreiber & Drake	10	0
(England) Lucas & Graeme	11	15	15
(England) Hardy & Stawell-Brown	15	7	12

Final
(England) St.John & Moseley	15	15
(England) Lucas & Graeme	0	5

== Mixed doubles ==
First round
(England) Miss Ellen Stawell-Brown (C Palace) & F. S. Collier (Guildford)	15	15
(England) Miss Deare & Loveday (Wantage)	3	9
(England) Miss E. M. Moseley & Pedder (Ealing)	15	15
(England) Miss H. Brooks & G. V. Robinson (Hersham)	3	9
(England) Miss Daisy St. John (Ealing) & Sydney Smith (Stroud)	10	15	15
(England) Mrs Ruth Watling & C. J. Wiltshire (Great Yarmouth)	15	3	8
(England) Mrs H. Wooler (N Somerset) & Hillier (Stowmarket)	15	8	18
(England) Miss Clarke (Cheltenham) & Robert Ransford (Crystal Palace)	7	15	17
(England) Miss Meriel Lucas & H. W. Davies (Teignmouth)
bye
(England) Miss Hamer & Campbell (Southport)
bye
(England) Miss Hogarth & C. A. Turner (Cheltenham)	15	15
(England) Mrs Campbell & Hamer (Southport)	5	3
(England) Mrs S. Murray (Cheltenham) & L. Hanson (Crystal Palace)	15	15
(England) Agnes Colles &Thomas Colles (Whaley Bridge)	5	4
(England) Mrs Cammell & Stewart Massey (Ealing)	15	15
(England) Miss Ormond & Ormond (Wantage)	2	3
(England) Miss E.M. Moseley & Richard St.John (Ealing)	w/o
(England) Miss Maidment & Nord (Newcastle)	scr
(England) Mina Schreiber (Bognor) & Herbert Mellersh (Guildford)	15	15
(England) Mary Schreiber & Percy Buckley (Guildford)	5	8
(England) Miss C. Brooks & C.C. Robinson (Hersham)	9	15	15
(England) Mrs Triscott & E. Young (Blackheath)	15	4	12
(England) Miss O. Martin & C. H. Martin (Ealing)	8	15	15
(England) Miss Drake (Bognor) & George Thomas (Southsea)	15	12	9
(England) Miss Burroughs (Southsea) & Ralph Watling (Great Yarmouth)	18	15
(England) Miss Florence Lannowe & Lannowe (Ealing)	13	8
(England) Miss Mabel Hardy (Crystal Palace) & George Vidal (Norwood)
bye
(England) Mrs F. Bowley & F. Bowley (Whaley Bridge)
bye

Second round
(England) Stawell-Brown & Collier	15	18
(England) Moseley & Pedder	4	9
(England) St.John & Smith	15	15
(England) Wooler & Hiller	3	4
(England) Lucas & Davies	15	15
(England) Hamer & Campbell	4	1
(England) Hogarth & Turner	15	15
(England) Murray & Hanson	8	13
(England) Cammell & Massey	15	15
(England) Moseley & St.John	10	3
(England) Schreiber & Mellersh	15	15
(England) Brooks & Robinson	0	4
(England) Martin & Martin	15	15
(England) Burroughs & Watling	5	10
(England) Hardy & Vidal	15	15
(England) Bowley & Bowley	6	3

Quarter-finals
(England) Stawell-Brown & Collier	15	15
(England) St.John & Smith	10	11
(England) Lucas & Davies	15	15
(England) Hogarth & Turner	4	10
(England) Cammell & Massey	15	15
(England) Schreiber & Mellersh	12	8
(England) Martin & Martin	15	15
(England) Hardy & Vidal	4	12

Semi-finals
(England) Stawell-Brown & Collier	15	5	18
(England) Lucas & Davies	3	15	17
(England) Cammell & Massey	2	15	18
(England) Martin & Martin	15	12	16

Final
(England) Stawell-Brown & Collier	15	5	18
(England) Cammell & Massey	8	15	17
