= 1900 All England Badminton Championships =

1900 All England Open Badminton Championships
Tournament details
- Dates: 18 April 1900 – 19 April 1900
- Edition: 2nd
- Venue: Scottish Drill Hall
- Location: Buckingham Gate, Westminster, London
- Official website: All England Championships

The 1900 All England Championships was the second annual badminton tournament held at the Scottish Drill Hall, the headquarters of the London Scottish Rifles at Buckingham Gate, Westminster, London, England from 18 to 19 April 1900.

== Final results ==
Category	Winners	Runners-up	Score
Men's singles	(England) Sydney Smith	(England) D. W. Oakes	15–12, 11–15, 15-10
Women's singles	(England) Ethel Thomson	(England) E. M. Moseley	17–15, 15-11
Men's doubles	(England) Herbert Mellersh & F.S.Collier	(England) D. W. Oakes & Stewart Massey	15-11, 8–15, 15–10
Women's doubles	(England) Meriel Lucas & Mary Graeme	(England) Ethel Thomson & I. Theobald	15-9, 5–15, 15–2
Mixed doubles	(England) D. W. Oakes & Daisy St. John	(England) Herbert Mellersh & Meriel Lucas	15-12, 15–12
Mixed doubles handicap	(England) Ralph Watling & Miss Worsley Roberts	(England) Wheelwright & Mrs Wheelwright	21-17

== Men's singles ==
First round
(England) Sydney Smith (Stroud)	15	w/o
(England) J. E. Hart (Norwood)	6	ret
(England) Bowley (Ealing)	w/o
(England) Herbert Mellersh (Guildford)	scr
(England) F. S. Collier (Guildford)
bye
(England) C. C. Robinson (Hersham)
bye
(England) Sismey (Boscombe)
bye
(England) Frederick Rathbone (Sutton Coldfield)
bye
(England) G. V. Robinson (Hersham)
bye
(England) Thomas Eddowes (Sutton Coldfield)
bye
(England) D. W. Oakes (Ealing)
bye
(England) Richard Stukeley St.John (Ealing)
bye
(England) Money (Hampstead)
bye
(England) Albert Prebble (Norwood)
bye
(England) C. E. Shepherd (Ealing)
bye
(England) Dr H. P. Lincoln (Guildford)	15	15
(England) Burges (Sutton Coldfield)	5	7
(England) Ralph Watling (Southsea)	15	15
(England) Stott (Boscombe)	3	6
(England) George Thomas (Southsea)	15	15
(England) Ridding (Stroud)	6	8

Second round
(England) Smith	15	15
(England) Bowley	3	6
(England) Collier	15	15
(England) Robinson	2	4
(England) Sismey	15	15
(England) Rathbone	14	3
(England) Robinson	15	17
(England) Eddowes	6	14
(England) Oakes	15	15
(England) St.John	7	12
(England) Money	w/o
(England) Prebble	scr
(England) Shepherd	15	15
(England) Lincoln	5	7
(England) Watling	15	15
(England) Thomas	3	12

Quarter-finals
(England) Smith	15	18
(England) Collier	7	15
(England) Sismey	15	15
(England) Robinson	9	13
(England) Oakes	15	15
(England) Money	3	6
(England) Shepherd	15	15
(England) Watling	2	4

Semi-finals
(England) Smith	15	15
(England) Sismey	12	1
(England) Oakes	15	15
(England) Shepherd	5	9

Final
(England) Smith	15	11	15
(England) Oakes	12	15	10

== Women's singles ==
First round
(England) Miss Ethel Thomson (Budleigh Salterton)	15	15
(England) Miss Bayly (Norwood)	5	7
(England) Miss H. Brooks (Hersham)
bye
(England) Miss Moseley (Ealing)
bye
(England) Miss C. Brooks (Hersham)
bye
(England) Miss Meriel Lucas (Teignmouth)
bye
(England) Miss Anderson (Boscombe)
bye
(England) Miss E. Cooper (East Molesey)
bye
(England) Mrs Murray (Stroud)
bye
(England) Miss E. M. Moseley (Ealing)
bye
(England) Miss Foote (Hampstead)
bye
(England) Miss Daisy St. John (Ealing)
bye
(England) Miss I. Theobald (Budleigh Salterton)
bye
(England) Miss O. Martin (Ealing)
bye
(England) Miss Florence Lannowe (Ealing)
bye
(England) Miss Edith Johnson (East Molesey)
bye
(England) Miss Ellen Stawell-Brown (Guildford)	15	15
(England) Miss Agnes Spankie (Ealing)	12	7

Second round
(England) Thomson	15	15
(England) Brooks H	3	3
(England) Moseley	9	15	15
(England) Brooks C	15	1	10
(England) Lucas	15	15
(England) Anderson	7	4
(England) Cooper	w/o
(England) Murray	scr
(England) Moseley E	w/o
(England) Foote	scr
(England) St.John	15	15
(England) Theobald	5	8
(England) Martin	15	15
(England) Lannowe	5	7
(England) Johnson	18	17
(England) Brown	15	14

Quarter-finals
(England) Thomson	15	15
(England) Moseley	7	10
(England) Lucas	15	15
(England) Cooper	8	3
(England) Moseley E	15	15	15
(England) St.John	18	2	4
(England) Martin	15	15
(England) Johnson	10	10

Semi-finals
(England) Thomson	15	6	15
(England) Lucas	11	15	9
(England) Moseley E	15	10	15
(England) Martin	9	15	12

Final
(England) Thomson	17	15
(England) Moseley E	15	11

== Men's doubles ==
First round
(England) Herbert Mellersh & F. S. Collier (Guildford)	15	15
(England) Sydney Smith & Ridding (Stroud)	8	10
(England) Richard Stukeley St.John & C. E. Shepherd (Ealing)	15	17
(England) Thomas Eddowes & Frederick Rathbone (Sutton Coldfield)	12	16
(England) Berger & George Thomas (Southsea)
bye
(England) Percy Buckley & Dr H. P. Lincoln (Guildford)
bye
(England) D. W. Oakes & Stewart Massey (Ealing)
bye
(England) Simsey & Stott (Boscombe)
bye
(England) C. C. Robinson & G. V. Robinson (Hersham)
bye
(England) Leonard Ransford & George Vidal (Norwood)	15	18
(England) Major-Gen Shakespear & Ralph Watling (Southsea)	12	16

Quarter-finals
(England) Mellersh & Collier	15	15
(England) St.John & Shepherd	7	10
(England) Berger & Thomas	9	15	17
(England) Buckley & Lincoln	15	10	16
(England) Oakes & Massey	15	15
(England) Simsey & Stott	5	4
(England) Robinson & Robinson	15	5	15
(England) Ransford & Vidal	9	15	10

Semi-finals
(England) Mellersh & Collier	15	15
(England) Berger & Thomas	12	10
(England) Oakes & Massey	15	15
(England) Robinson & Robinson	12	8

Final
(England) Mellersh & Collier	15	8	15
(England) Oakes & Massey	11	15	10

== Women's doubles ==
First round
(England) Meriel Lucas & Mary Graeme (Teignmouth)	15	15
(England) Miss Lloyd (Bognor) & Miss Berger (Southsea)	1	12
(England) Miss Vigors & Miss H. Brooks (Ealing)	15	15
(England) Miss Florence Lennowe & Miss Menzies (Sutton Coldfield)	11	7
(England) Miss Daisy St. John & Miss O. Martin (Ealing)
bye
(England) Miss Moseley & Miss E.M. Moseley (Ealing)	15	15
(England) Miss Turner & Miss Jacobs (Sutton)	1	1
(England) Miss I. Theobald & Miss Ethel Thomson (Budleigh Salterton)	15	15
(England) Miss Ellen Stawell-Brown (Guildford) & Miss Bayly (Norwood)	6	11
(England) Miss C. Cooper & Miss Johnson (East Molesey)	w/o
(England) Mrs Cammell & Miss Agnes Spankie (Ealing)	scr
(England) Miss Miller & Miss Worsley Roberts (Southsea)
bye
(England) Mrs Murray & Miss Clarke (Stroud)
bye

Quarter-finals
(England) Lucas & Graeme	15	15
(England) Vigors & H Brooks	2	3
(England) St.John & Martin	17	15
(England) Moseley & Moseley	14	8
(England) Theobald & Thomson	17	15
(England) Cooper & Johnson	2	9
(England) Millar & Roberts	15	15
(England) Murray & Clarke	1	11

Semi-finals
(England) Lucas & Graeme	15	15
(England) St.John & Martin	7	13
(England) Theobald & Thomson	15	9	15
(England) Millar & Roberts	3	15	2

Final
(England) Lucas & Graeme	15	5	15
(England) Theobald & Thomson	9	15	2

== Mixed doubles ==
First round
(England) Miss Daisy St. John & D. W. Oakes (Ealing)
bye
(England) Miss Lloyd (Bognor) & Percy Buckley (Guildford)
bye
(England) Miss Anderson & Sismey (Boscombe)
bye
(England) Miss Roberts & Burges (Sutton Coldfield)
(England) bye
(England) Miss Berger & Berger (Southsea)	15	18
(England) Miss Ellen Stawell-Brown & F. S. Collier (Guildford)	11	15
(England) Miss Clarke & Sydney Smith (Stroud)	15	15
(England) Miss Dobson (Norwood) & George Thomas (Southsea)	9	3
(England) Miss Straghan & George Vidal (Norwood)
bye
(England) Miss Bayly & Leonard Ransford (Norwood)	15	15
(England) Miss Johnson (East Molesey) & Bowley (Ealing)	7	5
(England) Meriel Lucas (Teignmouth) & Herbert Mellersh (Guildford)
(England) bye
(England) Mrs Lincoln & Dr H. P. Lincoln (Guildford)
bye
(England) Miss Catherine St.John & Richard Stukeley St.John (Ealing)
(England) bye
(England) Miss Hurlbatt & Albert Prebble (Norwood)
bye
(England) Mrs Murray & Ridding (Stroud)	15	12	15
(England) Miss Worsley Roberts & Ralph Watling (Southsea)	5	15	9
(England) Miss Vigors & G. V. Robinson (Hersham)	w/o
(England) Mrs Cammell & Stewart Massey (Ealing)	scr
(England) Miss Millar & Shakespear (Southsea)	9	15	15
(England) Miss O. Martin & C. E. Shepherd (Ealing)	15	11	10
(England) Miss C. Brooks & C. C. Robinson (Hersham)
bye

Second round
(England) St.John & Oakes	15	18
(England) Lloyd & Buckley	2	15
(England) Anderson & Sismey	15	15
(England) Roberts & Burges	1	9
(England) Berger & Berger	15	15
(England) Clarke & Smith	5	10
(England) Straghan & Vidal	7	17	15
(England) Bayly & Ransford	15	14	12
(England) Lucas & Mellersh	15	15
(England) Lincoln & Lincoln	5	0
(England) St.John & St.John	w/o
(England) Hurlbatt & Prebble	scr
(England) Murray & Ridding	15	15
(England) Vigors & G V Robinson	2	5
(England) Millar & Shakespear	15	15
(England) C Brooks & C C Robinson	7	9

Quarter-finals
(England) St.John & Oakes	15	18
(England) Anderson & Sismey	5	6
(England) Berger & Berger	15	15
(England) Straghan & Vidal	9	4
(England) Lucas & Mellersh	15	15
(England) St.John & St.John	1	1
(England) Murray & Ridding	15	15
(England) Millar & Shakespear	12	3

Semi-finals
(England) St.John & Oakes	15	15
(England) Berger & Berger	7	10
(England) Lucas & Mellersh	15	15
(England) Murray & Ridding	6	1

Final
(England) St.John & Oakes	15	15
(England) Lucas & Mellersh	12	12
