= 1899 All England Badminton Championships =

1899 All England Open Badminton Championships
Tournament details
- Dates: 4 April 1899 – 4 April 1899
- Edition: 1st
- Venue: Scottish Drill Hall
- Location: Buckingham Gate, Westminster, London
- Official website: All England Championships

The 1899 All England Championships was a badminton tournament held in the Scottish Drill Hall at the London Scottish Rifles Headquarters in Buckingham Gate, Westminster, London, England on 4 April 1899. There were no singles events staged.

== Origins ==
Following the first known open badminton tournament at the Guildford Drill Hall during 1898 the Badminton Association (BA) decided to stage the first All England Championships on 4 April 1899. The one day tournament was at the Drill Hall at the London Scottish Rifles Headquarters in Buckingham Gate and consisted of four courts with the two end courts having balconies over hanging them. The courts were basic very with nets only 16 feet wide, posts with extended canes and chalked lines. The principal event organisers were Mr Richard Fleming St Andrew St John (Honorary Secretary of the BA) and Mr Percy Buckley (Secretary of the Guildford Badminton Association and President of the BA). The winners received two guineas and runner up received one guinea.

== Final results ==
Category	Winners	Runners-up	Score
Men's doubles	(England) D. W. Oakes & Stewart Marsden Massey	(England) Col. Ian M. Campbell & L. Hanson	15-5 15-7
Women's doubles	(England) Meriel Lucas & Mary Graeme	(England) Ethel Thomson & I. Theobald	18–17, 15-5
Mixed doubles	(England) D. W. Oakes & Daisy St. John	(England) W. L. Lincoln & Collins	15-8 15-3

== Men's doubles ==
Fourteen pairs entered. There were two byes and two walk overs in the first round, the latter two because Buckell & Hillier and Mellersh & Collier scratched.

First round
(England) Stewart Massey (Ealing) & D. W. Oakes (Ealing)	15	15
(England) C. E. Shepherd (Ealing) & Ireland (Ealing)	2	2
(England) Hay (Southampton) & Saunders (Southampton)	15	15
(England) Edward St.John (Ealing) & Emerson (Ealing)	3	6
(England) Percy Buckley (Guildford) & H. P. Lincoln (Guildford)
bye
(England) Thomas Eddowes (Sutton Coldfield) & Frederick Rathbone (Sutton Coldfield)	w/o
(England) Herbert Mellersh (Guildford) & F. S. Collier (Guildford)	scr
(England) Col. Ian Campbell (Norwood) & L. Hanson (Norwood)	15	18
(England) Lock & Ward	10	17
(England) Brookes (Hersham) & Robinson (Hersham)	w/o
(England) Buckell & Hillier	scr
(England) J. H. E. Hart (Norwood); George Vidal (Norwood)	15	15
(England) Frere (Ealing) & Bowley (Unicorn)	7	6
(England) C Pett-Triscott (Sheen House) & Young (Sheen House)
bye

Quarter-finals
(England) Massey & Oakes	15	14	15
(England) Hay & Saunders	1	17	6
(England) Buckley & Lincoln	15	15
(England) Eddowes & Rathbone	3	10
(England) Campbell & Hanson	15	15
(England) Brookes & Robinson	0	5
(England) Hart & Vidal	18	9	15
(England) Pett-Triscott & Young	16	15	7

Semi-finals
(England) Massey & Oakes	15	15
(England) Buckley & Lincoln	12	8
(England) Campbell & Hanson	14	15	15
(England) Hart & Vidal	17	3	8

Final
(England) Massey & Oakes	15	15
(England) Campbell & Hanson	5	7

== Women's doubles ==
Thirteen pairs entered. There were three byes in the first round.

First round
(England) Miss Meriel Lucas (Wordsworth) & Miss Mary Graeme (Wordsworth)
bye
(England) Miss Straghan (Guildford) & Miss Collins (Guildford)
bye
(England) Mabel Hardy (Guildford) & Ellen Stawell-Brown (Guildford)	15	15
(England) Miss Agnes Spankie (Ealing) & Miss E. M. Moseley (Ealing)	5	7
(England) Mrs Cammell (Ealing) & Daisy St. John (Ealing)	15	15
(England) Miss Roberts (Sutton Coldfield) & Miss Hepburn (Sutton Coldfield)	1	4
(England) Miss Ethel Thomson (Budleigh Salterton) & Miss I. Theobald (Budleigh Salterton)	15	15
(England) Miss Owen (East Molesey) & Miss Edith Johnson (East Molesey)	2	4
(England) Mary Schreiber (Bognor) & Mina Schreiber (Bognor)	15	15
(England) Miss Sykes (Ealing) & Miss Florence Lannowe (Ealing)	11	6
(England) Miss A. Brown (Ealing) & Miss A. Martin (Ealing)
bye
(England) Miss C. Brooks (Hersham) & Miss H. Brooks (Hersham)	15	3	15
(England) Miss Hawks (Guildford) & Miss M. Hawks (Guildford)	10	15	4

Quarter-finals
(England) Lucas & Graeme	15	15
(England) Straghan & Collins	3	6
(England) Hardy & Stawell-Brown	15	15
(England) Cammell & St.John	11	12
(England) Thomson & Theobald	15	18
(England) Schreiber & Schreiber	8	17
(England) Brown & Martin	15	6	15
(England) Brooks & Brooks	12	15	11

Semi-finals
(England) Lucas & Graeme	15	15
(England) Hardy & Stawell-Brown	6	12
(England) Thomson & Theobald	15	15
(England) Brown & Martin	1	6

Final
(England) Lucas & Graeme	18	15
(England) Thomson & Theobald	17	5

== Mixed doubles ==
Twenty five mixed pairs entered.

First round
(England) D. W. Oakes (Ealing) & Miss Daisy St. John (Ealing)
bye
(England) L. Hanson (Norwood) & Mrs Hetley (Blackheath)	15	15
(England) C. Pett-Triscott (Sheen House) & Mrs Triscott (Sheen House)	4	0
(England) Hay (Southampton) & Ethel Thomson(Budleigh Salterton)
bye
(England) J. H. E. Hart (Norwood) & Miss I. Theobald (Budleigh Salterton)
bye
(England) Col. Ian Campbell (Norwood) & Miss Mabel Hardy (Norwood)	15	15
(England) Lukin (Hersham) & Miss Vigers (Hersham)	0	0
(England) George Vidal (Norwood) & Miss Straghan (Norwood)	15	17
(England) Bowley (Unicorn) & Miss Edith Johnson (East Molesey)	14	15
(England) Saunders (Guildford) & Miss M. Hawks (Guildford)	15	15
(England) E. Young (Blackheath) & Miss Turnbull (Blackheath)	9	6
(England) C. H. Shepherd (Ealing) & Miss O Martin (Ealing)	15	15
(England) Thomas Eddowes (Sutton Coldfield) & Miss Hepburn (Sutton Coldfield)	1	5
(England) Lincoln (Guildford) & Miss Collins (Guildford)
bye
(England) Shannon (Ealing) & Miss Agnes Spankie (Ealing)
bye
(England) Lock & Miss E. M. Moseley (Ealing)
bye
(England) Frederick Rathbone (Sutton Coldfield) & Miss Roberts (Sutton Coldfield)
bye
(England) Stewart Massey (Ealing) & Mrs Cammell (Ealing)	15	15
(England) Hughes (Guildford) & Miss Mary Graeme (Teighmouth)	4	8
(England) Edward St John (Ealing) & Miss Meriel Lucas (Teighnmouth)	15	15
(England) Percy Buckley (Guildford) & Miss Hawks (Guildford) 15-10 15-8	10	8
(England) Ireland (Ealing) & Ellen Stawell Brown (Guildford)	15	15
(England) Frere (Ealing) & Miss A. Brown (Ealing)	6	4
(England) Robinson (Hersham) & Brooks (Hersham)	15	15
(England) Emerson (Ealing) & Miss Florence Lannowe (Ealing)	9	7

Second round
(England) Oakes & St.John	15	15
(England) Hanson & Hetley	8	1
(England) Hay & Thomson	15	15
(England) Hart & Theobald	11	5
(England) Campbell & Hardy	15	15
(England) Vidal & Straghan	6	8
(England) Saunders & Hawks	15	15
(England) Shepherd & Martin	10	12
(England) Lincoln & Collins	15	15
(England) Shannon & Spankie	6	3
(England) Lock & Moseley	15	15
(England) Rathbone & Roberts	7	6
(England) Massey & Cammell	15	11	15
(England) St John & Lucas	12	15	5
(England) Ireland & Stawell-Brown	11	15	15
(England) Robinson & Brooks	15	9	5

Quarter-finals
(England) Oakes & St.John	15	15
(England) Hay & Thomson	9	10
(England) Campbell & Hardy	15	15
(England) Saunders & Hawks	11	9
(England) Lincoln & Collins	15	15
(England) Lock & Moseley	7	6
(England) Massey & Cammell	15	15
(England) Ireland & Stawell-Brown	5	6

Semi-finals
(England) Oakes & St.John	7	18	15
(England) Campbell & Hardy	15	17	9
(England) Lincoln & Collins	15	9	15
(England) Massey & Cammell	11	15	5

Final
(England) Oakes & St. John	15	15
(England) Lincoln & Collins	8	3
