= 1902 All England Badminton Championships =

1902 All England Championships
Tournament details
- Dates: 18 March 1902– 20 March 1902
- Edition: 4th
- Venue: Central Transept, The Crystal Palace
- Location: Sydenham, London
- Official website: All England Championships

The 1902 All England Championships was a badminton tournament held at the Central Transept, The Crystal Palace in Sydenham, London, England, from 18–20 March 1902.

Scoring in the singles went back to the first to 15 (for a game) following the previous year when it was 11. There were five rounds in the men's singles but the other events consisted of four rounds. The 1901 edition has been such a success that the Badminton Association put on extra events of a handicap nature. There were 47 entries for men and 49 for women and it was the first time that players from Scotland and Ireland entered. John Stokes & Thomas Good became the first non-English winners of an event although it was not considered one of the five 'Championship events'.

However there were only 9 entries for the women's doubles.

== Final results ==
Category	Winners	Runners-up	Score
Men's singles	(England) Ralph Watling	(England) E. Young	15-5, 15-7
Women's singles	(England) Meriel Lucas	(England) Ethel Thomson	15-11, 16-18, 15-2
Men's doubles	(England) Herbert Mellersh & F.S.Collier	(England) C. H. Martin & Stewart Massey	5-15, 15-11, 15-9
Women's doubles	(England) Meriel Lucas & Ethel Thomson	(England) Daisy St. John & E. M Moseley	18-17, 9-15, 15-9
Mixed doubles	(England) Leonard Ransford & E. M. Moseley	(England) Herbert Mellersh & Ethel Thomson	15-8, 15-11
Men's doubles handicap	(Republic of Ireland) John Stokes & Thomas Good (+5)	(England) Percy Buckley & George Thomas (+5)	15-9, 17-14
Women's doubles handicap	(England) Meriel Lucas & Mabel Hardy (-8)	(England) Daisy St. John & Dorothea Douglass (-3)	15-5, 15-11
Mixed doubles handicap	(England) Albert Prebble & Mabel Hardy (-6)	(England) Percy Buckley & O'Callaghan (+3)	15-13, 15-5

== Men's singles ==
First round
(England) Ralph Watling (Great Yarmouth)
(Republic of Ireland) Thomas Good (Sandford)
(England) E. Young (Blackheath)
(England) Norman Wood (Brinscall)

Second round
(England) Watling
(Republic of Ireland) Good
(England) Young
(England) Wood

Quarter-finals
(England) Watling
(Republic of Ireland) Good
(England) Young
(England) Wood

Semi-finals
(England) Watling	11	15	15
(Republic of Ireland) Good	15	8	2
(England) Young	15	17
(England) Wood	6	15

Final
(England) Watling	15	15
(England) Young	5	7

== Women's singles ==
First round
(England) Meriel Lucas (Teignmouth)
(England) Miss Mabel Hardy (Crystal Palace)
(England) Miss Edith Johnson (East Molesey)
(England) Miss Ethel Thomson (Budleigh Salterton)
(England) Mina Schreiber (Bognor)

Quarter-finals
(England) Lucas
(England) Hardy
(England) Johnson
(England) Thomson
(England) Schreiber

Semi-finals
(England) Lucas	15	15
(England) Hardy	5	8
(England) Thomson	15	15
(England) Schreiber	9	2

Final
(England) Lucas	15	16	15
(England) Thomson	11	18	2

== Men's doubles ==
First round
(England) Herbert Mellersh & F. S. Collier (Guildford)
(England) Ralph Watling & C. J. Wiltshire (Great Yarmouth)
(England) C. A. Turner (Cheltenham) & Albert Prebble (Crystal Palace)
(England) Stewart Massey & C. H. Martin (Ealing)
(England) Robert Ransford & Leonard Ransford (Crystal Palace)

Quarter-finals
(England) Mellersh & Collier
(England) Turner & Prebble
(England) Massey & Martin
(England) Ransford & Ransford

Semi-finals
(England) Mellersh & Collier	15	17
(England) Turner & Prebble	8	14
(England) Massey & Martin	10	15	15
(England) Ransford & Ransford	15	10	4

Final
(England) Mellersh & Collier	5	15	15
(England) Massey & Martin	15	11	9

== Women's doubles ==
First round
(England) Meriel Lucas (Teignmouth) & Ethel Thomson (B Salterton)
(England) Miss Moseley & Miss Douglass (Ealing)
(England) Miss Daisy St. John & Miss E. M. Moseley (Ealing)
(England) Miss Mabel Hardy (Crystal Palace) & Miss Ellen Stawell-Brown (Guildford)

Quarter-finals
(England) Lucas & Thomson
(England) Moseley & Douglass
(England) Moseley & St.John
(England) Hardy & Stawell-Brown

Semi-finals
(England) Lucas & Thomson	15	15
(England) Moseley & Douglass	5	3
(England) Moseley & St.John	15	15
(England) Stawell-Brown & Hardy	9	11

Final
(England) Lucas & Thomson	18	9	15
(England) Moseley & St.John	17	15	9

== Mixed doubles ==
First round
(England) Leonard Ransford (Crystal Palace) & Miss E. M. Moseley (Ealing)
(England) D. Oakes & Miss Daisy St. John (Ealing)
(England) Robert Ransford & Miss Mabel Hardy (Crystal Palace)
(England) Herbert Mellersh (Guildford) & Miss Ethel Thomson (B Salterton)
(England) George Thomas (Southsea) & Mina Schreiber (Bognor)

Quarter-finals
(England) L Ransford & Moseley
(England) R Ransford & Hardy
(England) Mellersh & Thomson
(England) Thomas & Schreiber

Semi-finals
(England) L Ransford & Moseley	10	15	18
(England) R Ransford & Hardy	15	4	15
(England) Mellersh & Thomson	11	15	15
(England) Thomas & Schreiber	15	11	10

Final
(England) Ransford & Moseley	15	15
(England) Mellersh & Thomson	8	11
