= 1905 All England Badminton Championships =

Tournament details
- Dates: 1 March 1905– 4 March 1905
- Edition: 7th
- Venue: London Rifle Brigade Drill Hall
- Location: 130 Bunhill Row, Islington, London
- Official website: All England Championships

The 1905 All England Open Badminton Championships was a badminton tournament held at the London Rifle Brigade Drill Hall, London, England, from March 1 to March 4, 1905.

Henry Marrett retained his men's singles title. Ethel Thomson and Meriel Lucas won a third women's doubles crown after retaining their title. Lucas also won her second singles title. There were no entries from Ireland.

== Final results ==
Category	Winners	Runners-up	Score
Men's singles	(England) Henry Marrett	(England) Ralph Watling	15–6, 15-2
Women's singles	(England) Meriel Lucas	(England) Mabel Hardy	9–15, 15–6, 15-9
Men's doubles	(England) Stewart Marsden Massey & C. T. J. Barnes	(England) Albert Prebble & Henry Marrett	11–15, 15–11, 15-10
Women's doubles	(England) Meriel Lucas & Ethel Thomson	(England) Dora Harvey & Mabel Hardy	15–3, 15-6
Mixed doubles	(England) Henry Marrett & Hazel Hogarth	(England) Sir George Thomas & Ethel Thomson	15–8, 15-2
Men's doubles handicap	(England) C. A. Turner & Norman Wood (owe 6)	(England) Sir George Thomas & Albert Cowley (owe 10)	11–15, 15–13, 15-7
Women's doubles handicap	(England) Hazel Hogarth & Miss G. L. Murray (owe 5)	(England) Muriel Bateman & Florence Lannowe (owe 2)	15–12, 15-7
Mixed doubles handicap	(England) Henry Marrett & Muriel Bateman (owe 12)	(England) J. H. Colin Prior & Miss G. L. Murray (owe 2)	12–15, 15–7, 15-10
Veterans' doubles handicap	(England) George Vidal & C. A. Turner (owe 6)	(England) C. G. Eames & H. C. Wright (owe 6)	15–8, 15-4

== Men's singles ==
First round
(England) Henry Marrett
bye
(England) H. C. Fanshawe
bye
(England) C. Collingwood	15	15
(England) D'Arcy Bannerman	5	5
(England) G. D. Wright	15	15
(England) Thomas Berger	0	0
(England) George Thomas
bye
(Scotland) H. J. H. Inglis
bye
(England) H. S. Venables
bye
(England) A. W. Andrews
bye
(England) Ralph Watling
bye
(England) Albert Cowley
bye
(England) E. P. Harrison	15	17
(England) T. H. E. Bird	12	14
(England) Edward Hawthorn
bye
(England) Norman Wood
bye
(England) Arthur Berger
bye
(England) J.H. Colin Prior
bye
(England) William Clark Player
bye

Second round
(England) Marrett	15	15
(England) Fanshawe	2	3
(England) Collingwood	15	15
(England) Wright	10	2
(England) Thomas	15	12	15
(Scotland) Inglis	6	15	10
(England) Venables	15	15
(England) Andrews	9	4
(England) Watling	15	15
(England) Cowley	4	6
(England) Harrison	15	15
(England) Hawthorn	5	4
(England) Wood	15	15
(England) Berger	1	0
(England) Prior	15	15
(England) Player	3	8

Quarter-finals
(England) Marrett	15	15
(England) Collingwood	0	2
(England) Thomas	15	15
(England) Venables	9	12
(England) Watling	15	15
(England) Harrison	1	8
(England) Wood	15	15
(England) Prior	6	9

Semi-finals
(England) Marrett	15	15
(England) Thomas	8	0
(England) Watling	15	7	15
(England) Wood	9	15	10

Final
(England) Marrett	15	15
(England) Watling	6	2

== Women's singles ==
First round
(England) Meriel Lucas	15	15
(England) Mrs F. H. White	1	0
(England) Ethel Thomson	15	15
(England) Miss S. A. Graham	1	0
(England) Mabel Hardy	15	15
(England) Ruth Watling	1	1
(England) Miss G. L. Murray	18	15
(England) Miss M. E. Brown	15	1

Semi-finals
(England) Lucas	12	18	15
(England) Thomson	15	16	8
(England) Hardy	15	15
(England) Murray	12	3

Final
(England) Lucas	9	15	15
(England) Hardy	15	6	9

== Men's doubles ==
First round
(England) Stewart Massey & C. T. J. Barnes	15	15
(England) Ralph Watling & George Thomas	3	5
(England) J.H. Colin Prior & (Scotland) H. J. H. Inglis	18	15
(England) Frank Abatt & E. P. Harrison	17	9
(England) R. Franck & G. D. Wright
bye
(Scotland) Thomas L. Adam & G. T. Crombie
bye
(England) Albert Prebble & Henry Marrett	15	15
(England) J. R. Fraser & T. H. E. Bird	5	4
(England) C. Collingwood & W. L. G. Heelas	15	15
(England) William Clark Player & H. C. Fanshawe	4	4
(England) Percy Buckley & Norman Wood	15	15
(England) H. R. Blaker & A. R. Brakspear	0	0
(England) Leonard Ransford & Robert Ransford	15	17
(England) P. Boyd & Edward Hawthorn	2	15

Quarter-finals
(England) Massey & Barnes	15	15
(England) Prior & (Scotland) Inglis	10	3
(England) Franck & Wright	w/o
(Scotland) Adam & Crombie	ret
(England) Prebble & Marrett	15	18
(England) Collingwood & Heelas	5	4
(England) Buckley & Wood	15	13	15
(England) Ransford & Ransford	10	15	12

Semi-finals
(England) Massey & Barnes	15	18
(England) Franck & Wright	7	0
(England) Prebble & Marrett	15	15
(England) Buckley & Wood	3	4

Final
(England) Massey & Barnes	13	15	15
(England) Prebble & Marrett	15	11	10

== Women's doubles ==
First round
(England) Ethel Thomson & Meriel Lucas	15	15
(England) Ruth Watling & Miss S. A. Graham	2	3
(England) Miss C. Orr & Florence Lannowe	15	15
(England) Mrs F. H. White & Miss M. E. Brown	9	4
(England) Mabel Hardy & Dora Harvey	15	15
(England) Muriel Bateman & Miss M. Drake	3	3
(England) Hazel Hogarth & Miss G. L. Murray	15	10	18
(England) Dorothy Cundall & Alice Gowenlock	5	15	13

Semi-finals
(England) Lucas & Thomson	15	15
(England) Orr & Lannowe	1	5
(England) Hardy & Harvey	15	15	15
(England) Hogarth & Murray	18	12	9

Final
(England) Lucas & Thomson	15	15
(England) Hardy & Harvey	3	6

== Mixed doubles ==
First round
(England) Henry Marrett & Hazel Hogarth	15	15
(England) H. C. Fanshawe & Dorothy Cundall	3	3
(England) Albert Prebble & Dora Harvey	15	5	15
(England) T. R. Fraser & Miss G. L. Murray	9	15	5
(England) J.H. Colin Prior & Miss M. Waller
bye
(England) Norman Wood & Miss E. C. Davenport
bye
(England) George Thomas & Ethel Thomson	15	15
(England) T. H. E. Bird & Miss Brooks	6	3
(England) Stewart Massey & Muriel Bateman	15	15
(England) William Clark Player & Miss M. E. Brown	3	10
(England) Ralph Watling & Meriel Lucas
bye
(England) Leonard Ransford & Mabel Hardy
bye

Quarter-finals
(England) Marrett & Hogarth	15	15
(England) Prebble & Harvey	4	9
(England) Prior & Waller	15	12	15
(England) Wood & Davenport	9	15	11
(England) Thomas & Thomson	15	18
(England) Massey & Bateman	8	15
(England) Watling & Lucas	15	15
(England) Ransford & Hardy	10	8

Semi-finals
(England) Marrett & Hogarth	15	18
(England) Prior & Waller	1	8
(England) Thomas & Thomson	15	15
(England) Watling & Lucas	4	12

Final
(England) Marrett & Hogarth	15	15
(England) Thomas & Thomson	8	2
