= All England Open Badminton Championships =

World's oldest badminton tournament

All England Open
- Official website
- Founded: 1899; 127 years ago
- Editions: 116 (2026)
- Location: Birmingham (2026); England
- Venue: Arena Birmingham (2026)
- Prize money: USD1,450,000 (2026)

Men's
- Draw: 32S / 32D
- Current champions: Lin Chun-yi (singles); Kim Won-ho; Seo Seung-jae (doubles)
- Most singles titles: 8, Rudy Hartono
- Most doubles titles: 9, George Alan Thomas

Women's
- Draw: 32S / 32D
- Current champions: Wang Zhiyi (singles); Liu Shengshu; Tan Ning (doubles)
- Most singles titles: 10, Judy Devlin
- Most doubles titles: 10, Meriel Lucas

Mixed doubles
- Draw: 32
- Current champions: Ye Hong-wei; Nicole Gonzales Chan
- Most titles (male): 8 George Alan Thomas; Finn Kobberø
- Most titles (female): 8, Betty Uber

Super 1000
- All England Open; China Open; Indonesia Open; Malaysia Open

Last completed
- 2026 All England Open

The All England Open Badminton Championships is the world's oldest badminton tournament, held annually in England. With the introduction of the BWF's latest grading system, it was given Super Series status in 2007, upgraded to Super Series Premier status in 2011, and designated a Super 1000 event at the birth of the World Tour in 2018. The Super 1000 events, held in four historic strongholds of the sport of badminton (Great Britain, China, Malaysia and Indonesia) are the highest level events below the World Championships and Olympic Games tournaments, and broadly equivalent in stature, though apart from the All-England not in historicity, to the Grand Slam tournaments in tennis.

The world's first open tournament was held in the English town of Guildford in 1898, the success of which led to the All England's inaugural edition, which was held at London's Horticultural Halls in 1899. Although the inaugural edition consisted of just the doubles format, the singles were introduced from the second edition onward. It was eventually considered – especially after the first Thomas Cup series in 1949 – the unofficial world championship of the sport until 1977, when the International Badminton Federation launched its official championships.

There were two instances when it was halted – from 1915 to 1919, due to World War I, and from 1940 to 1946, due to World War II.

== Venues ==
The tournament has been held at eight venues, and is now played at Arena Birmingham, Birmingham.

Years active	Venue	Location
1899–1901	HQ of the London Scottish Rifles	Buckingham Gate
1902	Crystal Palace Central Transept	Sydenham Hill
1903–1909	London Rifles Brigade's City Headquarters	Bunhill Row, Islington
1910–1939	Lindley Hall, Vincent Square	Westminster, London
1947–1949	Harringay Arena, North London Stadium	North London
1950–1956	Empress Hall	Earls Court
1957–1993	Wembley Arena	Wembley, London
1994–present	Arena Birmingham	Birmingham

Locations of All England Open Badminton Championships host cities

== Past winners ==
Year	Men's singles	Women's singles	Men's doubles	Women's doubles	Mixed doubles
1899	no competition		(England) D. W. Oakes (England) Stewart Marsden Massey	(England) Meriel Lucas (England) Mary Graeme	(England) D. W. Oakes (England) Daisy St. John
1900	(England) Sydney H. Smith	(England) Ethel Thomson	(England) Herbert Mellersh (England) F. S. Collier	(England) Meriel Lucas (England) Mary Graeme	(England) D. W. Oakes (England) Daisy St. John
1901	(England) H. W. Davies	(England) Ethel Thomson	(England) Herbert Mellersh (England) F. S. Collier	(England) Daisy St. John (England) E. M. Moseley	(England) F. S. Collier (England) Ellen Mary Stawell-Brown
1902	(England) Ralph Watling	(England) Meriel Lucas	(England) Herbert Mellersh (England) F. S. Collier	(England) Ethel Thomson (England) Meriel Lucas	(England) Leonard Ransford (England) E. M. Moseley
1903	(England) Ralph Watling	(England) Ethel Thomson	(England) Stewart Marsden Massey (England) Edward Huson	(England) Mabel Hardy (England) Dorothea Douglass	(England) George Alan Thomas (England) Ethel Thomson
1904	(England) Henry Norman Marrett	(England) Ethel Thomson	(England) Albert Prebble (England) Henry Norman Marrett	(England) Ethel Thomson (England) Meriel Lucas	(England) Henry Norman Marrett (England) Dorothea Douglass
1905	(England) Henry Norman Marrett	(England) Meriel Lucas	(England) C. T. J. Barnes (England) Stewart Marsden Massey	(England) Ethel Thomson (England) Meriel Lucas	(England) Henry Norman Marrett (England) Hazel Hogarth
1906	(England) Norman Wood	(England) Ethel Thomson	(England) Henry Norman Marrett (England) George Alan Thomas	(England) Ethel Thomson (England) Meriel Lucas	(England) George Alan Thomas (England) Ethel Thomson
1907	(England) Norman Wood	(England) Meriel Lucas	(England) Albert Prebble (England) Norman Wood	(England) G. L. Murray (England) Meriel Lucas	(England) George Alan Thomas (England) G. L. Murray
1908	(England) Henry Norman Marrett	(England) Meriel Lucas	(England) Henry Norman Marrett (England) George Alan Thomas	(England) G. L. Murray (England) Meriel Lucas	(England) Norman Wood (England) Meriel Lucas
1909	(England) Frank Chesterton	(England) Meriel Lucas	(England) Frank Chesterton (England) Albert Prebble	(England) G. L. Murray (England) Meriel Lucas	(England) Albert Prebble (England) Dora Boothby
1910	(England) Frank Chesterton	(England) Meriel Lucas	(England) Henry Norman Marrett (England) George Alan Thomas	(England) Muriel Bateman (England) Meriel Lucas	(England) Guy A. Sautter (England) Dorothy Cundall
1911	(England) Guy A. Sautter	(England) Margaret Larminie	(England) Percy Fitton (England) Edward Hawthorn	(England) Alice Gowenlock (England) Dorothy Cundall	(England) George Alan Thomas (England) Margaret Larminie
1912	(England) Frank Chesterton	(England) Margaret Tragett	(England) Henry Norman Marrett (England) George Alan Thomas	(England) Alice Gowenlock (England) Dorothy Cundall	(England) Edward Hawthorn (England) Hazel Hogarth
1913	(England) Guy A. Sautter	(England) Lavinia Radeglia	(England) Frank Chesterton (England) George Alan Thomas	(England) Hazel Hogarth (England) Muriel Bateman	(England) Guy A. Sautter (England) M. E. Mayston
1914	(England) Guy A. Sautter	(England) Lavinia Radeglia	(England) Frank Chesterton (England) George Alan Thomas	(England) Margaret Tragett (England) Eveline Peterson	(England) George Alan Thomas (England) Hazel Hogarth
1915– 1919	no competition				
1920	(England) George Alan Thomas	(England) Kitty McKane	(England) Archibald Engelbach (England) Raoul du Roveray	(England) Lavinia Radeglia (England) Violet Elton	(England) George Alan Thomas (England) Hazel Hogarth
1921	(England) George Alan Thomas	(England) Kitty McKane	(England) George Alan Thomas (England) Frank Hodge	(England) Margaret McKane (England) Kitty McKane	(England) George Alan Thomas (England) Hazel Hogarth
1922	(England) George Alan Thomas	(England) Kitty McKane	(England) Guy A. Sautter (Ireland) Frank Devlin	(England) Margaret Tragett (England) Hazel Hogarth	(England) George Alan Thomas (England) Hazel Hogarth
1923	(England) George Alan Thomas	(England) Lavinia Radeglia	(Irish Free State) Frank Devlin (Irish Free State) Gordon Mack	(England) Margaret Tragett (England) Hazel Hogarth	(Irish Free State) Gordon Mack (England) Margaret Tragett
1924	(Irish Free State) Gordon Mack	(England) Kitty McKane	(England) George Alan Thomas (England) Frank Hodge	(England) Margaret Stocks (England) Kitty McKane	(Republic of Ireland) Frank Devlin (England) Kitty McKane
1925	(Irish Free State) Frank Devlin	(England) Margaret Stocks	(England) Herbert Uber (England) Arthur Kenneth Jones	(England) Margaret Tragett (England) Hazel Hogarth	(Republic of Ireland) Frank Devlin (England) Kitty McKane
1926	(Irish Free State) Frank Devlin	(England) Marjorie Barrett	(Irish Free State) Frank Devlin (Irish Free State) Gordon Mack	(Irish Free State) A. M. Head (England) Violet Elton	(Irish Free State) Frank Devlin (England) Eveline Peterson
1927	(Irish Free State) Frank Devlin	(England) Marjorie Barrett	(Irish Free State) Frank Devlin (Irish Free State) Gordon Mack	(England) Margaret Tragett (England) Hazel Hogarth	(Irish Free State) Frank Devlin (England) Eveline Peterson
1928	(Irish Free State) Frank Devlin	(England) Margaret Tragett	(England) George Alan Thomas (England) Frank Hodge	(England) Marjorie Barrett (England) Violet Elton	(England) Albert Harbot (England) Margaret Tragett
1929	(Irish Free State) Frank Devlin	(England) Marjorie Barrett	(Irish Free State) Frank Devlin (Irish Free State) Gordon Mack	(England) Marjorie Barrett (England) Violet Elton	(Irish Free State) Frank Devlin (England) Marian Horsley
1930	(England) Donald C. Hume	(England) Marjorie Barrett	(Irish Free State) Frank Devlin (Irish Free State) Gordon Mack	(England) Marjorie Barrett (England) Violet Elton	(England) Herbert Uber (England) Betty Uber
1931	(Irish Free State) Frank Devlin	(England) Marjorie Barrett	(Irish Free State) Frank Devlin (Irish Free State) Gordon Mack	(England) Marian Horsley (England) Betty Uber	(England) Herbert Uber (England) Betty Uber
1932	(England) Ralph Nichols	(England) Leoni Kingsbury	(England) Donald C. Hume (England) Raymond M. White	(England) Marjorie Barrett (England) Leoni Kingsbury	(England) Herbert Uber (England) Betty Uber
1933	(England) Raymond M. White	(England) Alice Woodroffe	(England) Donald C. Hume (England) Raymond M. White	(England) Marje Bell (England) Thelma Kingsbury	(England) Donald C. Hume (England) Betty Uber
1934	(England) Ralph Nichols	(England) Leoni Kingsbury	(England) Donald C. Hume (England) Raymond M. White	(England) Marje Henderson (England) Thelma Kingsbury	(England) Donald C. Hume (England) Betty Uber
1935	(England) Raymond M. White	(England) Betty Uber	(England) Donald C. Hume (England) Raymond M. White	(England) Marje Henderson (England) Thelma Kingsbury	(England) Donald C. Hume (England) Betty Uber
1936	(England) Ralph Nichols	(England) Thelma Kingsbury	(England) Leslie Nichols (England) Ralph Nichols	(England) Marje Henderson (England) Thelma Kingsbury	(England) Donald C. Hume (England) Betty Uber
1937	(England) Ralph Nichols	(England) Thelma Kingsbury	(England) Leslie Nichols (England) Ralph Nichols	(England) Betty Uber (England) Diana Doveton	(Irish Free State) Ian Maconachie (England) Thelma Kingsbury
1938	(England) Ralph Nichols	(England) Daphne Young	(England) Leslie Nichols (England) Ralph Nichols	(England) Betty Uber (England) Diana Doveton	(England) Raymond M. White (England) Betty Uber
1939	(Denmark) Tage Madsen	(Canada) Dorothy Walton	(Republic of Ireland) Thomas Boyle (Republic of Ireland) James Rankin	(Denmark) Ruth Dalsgaard (Denmark) Tonny Olsen	(England) Ralph Nichols (England) Bessie Staples
1940– 1946	no competition				
1947	(Sweden) Conny Jepsen	(Denmark) Marie Ussing	(Denmark) Tage Madsen (Denmark) Poul Holm	(Denmark) Tonny Ahm (Denmark) Kirsten Thorndahl	(Denmark) Poul Holm (Denmark) Tonny Ahm
1948	(Denmark) Jørn Skaarup	(Denmark) Kirsten Thorndahl	(Denmark) Preben Dabelsteen (Denmark) Børge Frederiksen	(Denmark) Tonny Ahm (Denmark) Kirsten Thorndahl	(Denmark) Jørn Skaarup (Denmark) Kirsten Thorndahl
1949	(United States) David G. Freeman	(Denmark) Aase Schiøtt Jacobsen	(Malaysia) Ooi Teik Hock (Malaysia) Teoh Seng Khoon	(England) Betty Uber (England) Queenie Allen	(United States) Clinton Stephens (United States) Patricia Stephens
1950	(Malaysia) Wong Peng Soon	(Denmark) Tonny Ahm	(Denmark) Jørn Skaarup (Denmark) Preben Dabelsteen	(Denmark) Tonny Ahm (Denmark) Kirsten Thorndahl	(Denmark) Poul Holm (Denmark) Tonny Ahm
1951	(Malaysia) Wong Peng Soon	(Denmark) Aase Schiøtt Jacobsen	(Malaysia) David Choong (Malaysia) Eddy Choong	(Denmark) Tonny Ahm (Denmark) Kirsten Thorndahl	(Denmark) Poul Holm (Denmark) Tonny Ahm
1952	(Malaysia) Wong Peng Soon	(Denmark) Tonny Ahm	(Malaysia) David Choong (Malaysia) Eddy Choong	(Denmark) Tonny Ahm (Denmark) Aase Schiøtt Jacobsen	(Denmark) Poul Holm (Denmark) Tonny Ahm
1953	(Malaysia) Eddy Choong	(Denmark) Marie Ussing	(Malaysia) David Choong (Malaysia) Eddy Choong	(England) Iris Cooley (England) June White	(Malaysia) David Choong (England) June White
1954	(Malaysia) Eddy Choong	(United States) Judy Devlin	(Malaysia) Ooi Teik Hock (Malaysia) Ong Poh Lim	(England) Sue Devlin (United States) Judy Devlin	(England) John Best (England) Iris Cooley
1955	(Malaysia) Wong Peng Soon	(United States) Margaret Varner	(Denmark) Finn Kobberø (Denmark) Jørgen Hammergaard Hansen	(England) Iris Cooley (England) June White	(Denmark) Finn Kobberø (Denmark) Kirsten Thorndahl
1956	(Malaysia) Eddy Choong	(United States) Margaret Varner	(Denmark) Finn Kobberø (Denmark) Jørgen Hammergaard Hansen	(England) Sue Devlin (United States) Judy Devlin	(England) Tony Jordan (England) June Timperley
1957	(Malaysia) Eddy Choong	(United States) Judy Devlin	(United States) Joe Alston (Malaysia) Johnny Heah	(Denmark) Anni Hammergaard Hansen (Denmark) Kirsten Thorndahl	(Denmark) Finn Kobberø (Denmark) Kirsten Thorndahl
1958	(Denmark) Erland Kops	(United States) Judy Devlin	(Denmark) Erland Kops (Denmark) Poul-Erik Nielsen	(United States) Margaret Varner (England) Heather Ward	(England) Tony Jordan (England) June Timperley
1959	(Indonesia) Tan Joe Hok	(England) Heather Ward	(Malaysia) Lim Say Hup (Malaysia) Teh Kew San	(England) Iris Rogers (England) June Timperley	(Denmark) Poul-Erik Nielsen (Denmark) Inge Birgit Hansen
1960	(Denmark) Erland Kops	(United States) Judy Devlin	(Denmark) Finn Kobberø (Denmark) Poul-Erik Nielsen	(England) Sue Devlin (United States) Judy Devlin	(Denmark) Finn Kobberø (Denmark) Kirsten Granlund
1961	(Denmark) Erland Kops	(United States) Judy Hashman	(Denmark) Finn Kobberø (Denmark) Jørgen Hammergaard Hansen	(United States) Judy Hashman (Republic of Ireland) Sue Devlin Peard	(Denmark) Finn Kobberø (Denmark) Kirsten Granlund
1962	(Denmark) Erland Kops	(United States) Judy Hashman	(Denmark) Finn Kobberø (Denmark) Jørgen Hammergaard Hansen	(United States) Judy Hashman (Denmark) Tonny Holst-Christensen	(Denmark) Finn Kobberø (Denmark) Ulla Rasmussen
1963	(Denmark) Erland Kops	(United States) Judy Hashman	(Denmark) Finn Kobberø (Denmark) Jørgen Hammergaard Hansen	(United States) Judy Hashman (Republic of Ireland) Sue Devlin Peard	(Denmark) Finn Kobberø (Denmark) Ulla Rasmussen
1964	(Denmark) Knud Aage Nielsen	(United States) Judy Hashman	(Denmark) Finn Kobberø (Denmark) Jørgen Hammergaard Hansen	(Denmark) Karin Jørgensen (Denmark) Ulla Rasmussen	(England) Tony Jordan (England) Jenny Pritchard
1965	(Denmark) Erland Kops	(England) Ursula Smith	(Malaysia) Ng Boon Bee (Malaysia) Tan Yee Khan	(Denmark) Karin Jørgensen (Denmark) Ulla Strand	(Denmark) Finn Kobberø (Denmark) Ulla Strand
1966	(Malaysia) Tan Aik Huang	(United States) Judy Hashman	(Malaysia) Ng Boon Bee (Malaysia) Tan Yee Khan	(United States) Judy Hashman (Republic of Ireland) Sue Devlin Peard	(Denmark) Finn Kobberø (Denmark) Ulla Strand
1967	(Denmark) Erland Kops	(United States) Judy Hashman	(Denmark) Henning Borch (Denmark) Erland Kops	(Netherlands) Imre Rietveld (Denmark) Ulla Strand	(Denmark) Svend Pri (Denmark) Ulla Strand
1968	(Indonesia) Rudy Hartono	(Sweden) Eva Twedberg	(Denmark) Henning Borch (Denmark) Erland Kops	(Indonesia) Minarni Sudaryanto (Indonesia) Retno Koestijah	(England) Tony Jordan (England) Susan Pound
1969	(Indonesia) Rudy Hartono	(Japan) Hiroe Yuki	(Denmark) Henning Borch (Denmark) Erland Kops	(England) Margaret Boxall (England) Susan Whetnall	(England) Roger Mills (England) Gillian Perrin
1970	(Indonesia) Rudy Hartono	(Japan) Etsuko Takenaka	(Denmark) Tom Bacher (Denmark) Poul Petersen	(England) Margaret Boxall (England) Susan Whetnall	(Denmark) Per Walsøe (Denmark) Pernille Mølgaard Hansen
1971	(Indonesia) Rudy Hartono	(Sweden) Eva Twedberg	(Malaysia) Ng Boon Bee (Malaysia) Punch Gunalan	(Japan) Noriko Takagi (Japan) Hiroe Yuki	(Denmark) Svend Pri (Denmark) Ulla Strand
1972	(Indonesia) Rudy Hartono	(Japan) Noriko Nakayama	(Indonesia) Christian Hadinata (Indonesia) Ade Chandra	(Japan) Machiko Aizawa (Japan) Etsuko Takenaka	(Denmark) Svend Pri (Denmark) Ulla Strand
1973	(Indonesia) Rudy Hartono	(England) Margaret Beck	(Indonesia) Christian Hadinata (Indonesia) Ade Chandra	(Japan) Machiko Aizawa (Japan) Etsuko Takenaka	(England) Derek Talbot (England) Gillian Gilks
1974	(Indonesia) Rudy Hartono	(Japan) Hiroe Yuki	(Indonesia) Tjun Tjun (Indonesia) Johan Wahjudi	(England) Margaret Beck (England) Gillian Gilks	(England) David Eddy (England) Susan Whetnall
1975	(Denmark) Svend Pri	(Japan) Hiroe Yuki	(Indonesia) Tjun Tjun (Indonesia) Johan Wahjudi	(Japan) Machiko Aizawa (Japan) Etsuko Takenaka	(England) Elliot Stuart (England) Nora Gardner
1976	(Indonesia) Rudy Hartono	(England) Gillian Gilks	(Sweden) Bengt Fröman (Sweden) Thomas Kihlström	(England) Gillian Gilks (England) Susan Whetnall	(England) Derek Talbot (England) Gillian Gilks
1977	(Denmark) Flemming Delfs	(Japan) Hiroe Yuki	(Indonesia) Tjun Tjun (Indonesia) Johan Wahjudi	(Japan) Etsuko Toganoo (Japan) Emiko Ueno	(England) Derek Talbot (England) Gillian Gilks
1978	(Indonesia) Liem Swie King	(England) Gillian Gilks	(Indonesia) Tjun Tjun (Indonesia) Johan Wahjudi	(Japan) Atsuko Tokuda (Japan) Mikiko Takada	(England) Mike Tredgett (England) Nora Perry
1979	(Indonesia) Liem Swie King	(Denmark) Lene Køppen	(Indonesia) Tjun Tjun (Indonesia) Johan Wahjudi	(Indonesia) Verawaty Fadjrin (Indonesia) Imelda Wiguna	(Indonesia) Christian Hadinata (Indonesia) Imelda Wiguna
1980	(India) Prakash Padukone	(Denmark) Lene Køppen	(Indonesia) Tjun Tjun (Indonesia) Johan Wahjudi	(England) Gillian Gilks (England) Nora Perry	(England) Mike Tredgett (England) Nora Perry
1981	(Indonesia) Liem Swie King	(South Korea) Hwang Sun-ai	(Indonesia) Rudy Heryanto (Indonesia) Hariamanto Kartono	(England) Nora Perry (England) Jane Webster	(England) Mike Tredgett (England) Nora Perry
1982	(Denmark) Morten Frost	(China) Zhang Ailing	(Malaysia) Razif Sidek (Malaysia) Jalani Sidek	(China) Lin Ying (China) Wu Dixi	(England) Martin Dew (England) Gillian Gilks
1983	(China) Luan Jin	(China) Zhang Ailing	(Sweden) Thomas Kihlström (Sweden) Stefan Karlsson	(China) Xu Rong (China) Wu Jianqiu	(Sweden) Thomas Kihlström (England) Nora Perry
1984	(Denmark) Morten Frost	(China) Li Lingwei	(Indonesia) Rudy Heryanto (Indonesia) Hariamanto Kartono	(China) Lin Ying (China) Wu Dixi	(England) Martin Dew (England) Gillian Gilks
1985	(China) Zhao Jianhua	(China) Han Aiping	(South Korea) Kim Moon-soo (South Korea) Park Joo-bong	(China) Han Aiping (China) Li Lingwei	(Scotland) Billy Gilliland (England) Nora Perry
1986	(Denmark) Morten Frost	(South Korea) Kim Yun-ja	(South Korea) Kim Moon-soo (South Korea) Park Joo-bong	(South Korea) Chung Myung-hee (South Korea) Hwang Hye-young	(South Korea) Park Joo-bong (South Korea) Chung Myung-hee
1987	(Denmark) Morten Frost	(Denmark) Kirsten Larsen	(China) Li Yongbo (China) Tian Bingyi	(South Korea) Chung Myung-hee (South Korea) Hwang Hye-young	(South Korea) Lee Deuk-choon (South Korea) Chung Myung-hee
1988	(Denmark) Ib Frederiksen	(China) Gu Jiaming	(China) Li Yongbo (China) Tian Bingyi	(South Korea) Chung So-young (South Korea) Kim Yun-ja	(China) Wang Pengren (China) Shi Fangjing
1989	(China) Yang Yang	(China) Li Lingwei	(South Korea) Lee Sang-bok (South Korea) Park Joo-bong	(South Korea) Chung Myung-hee (South Korea) Chung So-young	(South Korea) Park Joo-bong (South Korea) Chung Myung-hee
1990	(China) Zhao Jianhua	(Indonesia) Susi Susanti	(South Korea) Kim Moon-soo (South Korea) Park Joo-bong	(South Korea) Chung Myung-hee (South Korea) Hwang Hye-young	(South Korea) Park Joo-bong (South Korea) Chung Myung-hee
1991	(Indonesia) Ardy Wiranata	(Indonesia) Susi Susanti	(China) Li Yongbo (China) Tian Bingyi	(South Korea) Chung So-young (South Korea) Hwang Hye-young	(South Korea) Park Joo-bong (South Korea) Chung Myung-hee
1992	(China) Liu Jun	(China) Tang Jiuhong	(Indonesia) Rudy Gunawan (Indonesia) Eddy Hartono	(China) Yao Fen (China) Lin Yanfen	(Denmark) Thomas Lund (Denmark) Pernille Dupont
1993	(Indonesia) Hariyanto Arbi	(Indonesia) Susi Susanti	(Denmark) Jon Holst-Christensen (Denmark) Thomas Lund	(South Korea) Chung So-young (South Korea) Gil Young-ah	(Denmark) Jon Holst-Christensen (Denmark) Grete Mogensen
1994	(Indonesia) Hariyanto Arbi	(Indonesia) Susi Susanti	(Indonesia) Rudy Gunawan (Indonesia) Bambang Suprianto	(South Korea) Chung So-young (South Korea) Gil Young-ah	(England) Nick Ponting (England) Joanne Wright
1995	(Denmark) Poul-Erik Høyer Larsen	(Sweden) Lim Xiaoqing	(Indonesia) Ricky Subagja (Indonesia) Rexy Mainaky	(South Korea) Gil Young-ah (South Korea) Jang Hye-ock	(Denmark) Thomas Lund (Denmark) Marlene Thomsen
1996	(Denmark) Poul-Erik Høyer Larsen	(South Korea) Bang Soo-hyun	(Indonesia) Ricky Subagja (Indonesia) Rexy Mainaky	(China) Ge Fei (China) Gu Jun	(South Korea) Park Joo-bong (South Korea) Ra Kyung-min
1997	(China) Dong Jiong	(China) Ye Zhaoying	(South Korea) Ha Tae-kwon (South Korea) Kang Kyung-jin	(China) Ge Fei (China) Gu Jun	(China) Liu Yong (China) Ge Fei
1998	(China) Sun Jun	(China) Ye Zhaoying	(South Korea) Lee Dong-soo (South Korea) Yoo Yong-sung	(China) Ge Fei (China) Gu Jun	(South Korea) Kim Dong-moon (South Korea) Ra Kyung-min
1999	(Denmark) Peter Gade	(China) Ye Zhaoying	(Indonesia) Candra Wijaya (Indonesia) Tony Gunawan	(South Korea) Chung Jae-hee (South Korea) Ra Kyung-min	(England) Simon Archer (England) Joanne Goode
2000	(China) Xia Xuanze	(China) Gong Zhichao	(South Korea) Ha Tae-kwon (South Korea) Kim Dong-moon	(China) Ge Fei (China) Gu Jun	(South Korea) Kim Dong-moon (South Korea) Ra Kyung-min
2001	(India) Pullela Gopichand	(China) Gong Zhichao	(Indonesia) Tony Gunawan (Indonesia) Halim Haryanto	(China) Gao Ling (China) Huang Sui	(China) Zhang Jun (China) Gao Ling
2002	(China) Chen Hong	(Denmark) Camilla Martin	(South Korea) Ha Tae-kwon (South Korea) Kim Dong-moon	(China) Gao Ling (China) Huang Sui	(South Korea) Kim Dong-moon (South Korea) Ra Kyung-min
2003	(Malaysia) Muhammad Hafiz Hashim	(China) Zhou Mi	(Indonesia) Candra Wijaya (Indonesia) Sigit Budiarto	(China) Gao Ling (China) Huang Sui	(China) Zhang Jun (China) Gao Ling
2004	(China) Lin Dan	(China) Gong Ruina	(Denmark) Jens Eriksen (Denmark) Martin Lundgaard Hansen	(China) Gao Ling (China) Huang Sui	(South Korea) Kim Dong-moon (South Korea) Ra Kyung-min
2005	(China) Chen Hong	(China) Xie Xingfang	(China) Cai Yun (China) Fu Haifeng	(China) Gao Ling (China) Huang Sui	(England) Nathan Robertson (England) Gail Emms
2006	(China) Lin Dan	(China) Xie Xingfang	(Denmark) Jens Eriksen (Denmark) Martin Lundgaard Hansen	(China) Gao Ling (China) Huang Sui	(China) Zhang Jun (China) Gao Ling
2007	(China) Lin Dan	(China) Xie Xingfang	(Malaysia) Koo Kien Keat (Malaysia) Tan Boon Heong	(China) Wei Yili (China) Zhang Yawen	(China) Zheng Bo (China) Gao Ling
2008	(China) Chen Jin	(Denmark) Tine Rasmussen	(South Korea) Jung Jae-sung (South Korea) Lee Yong-dae	(South Korea) Lee Hyo-jung (South Korea) Lee Kyung-won	(China) Zheng Bo (China) Gao Ling
2009	(China) Lin Dan	(China) Wang Yihan	(China) Cai Yun (China) Fu Haifeng	(China) Zhang Yawen (China) Zhao Tingting	(China) He Hanbin (China) Yu Yang
2010	(Malaysia) Lee Chong Wei	(Denmark) Tine Rasmussen	(Denmark) Lars Paaske (Denmark) Jonas Rasmussen	(China) Du Jing (China) Yu Yang	(China) Zhang Nan (China) Zhao Yunlei
2011	(Malaysia) Lee Chong Wei	(China) Wang Shixian	(Denmark) Mathias Boe (Denmark) Carsten Mogensen	(China) Wang Xiaoli (China) Yu Yang	(China) Xu Chen (China) Ma Jin
2012	(China) Lin Dan	(China) Li Xuerui	(South Korea) Jung Jae-sung (South Korea) Lee Yong-dae	(China) Tian Qing (China) Zhao Yunlei	(Indonesia) Tontowi Ahmad (Indonesia) Liliyana Natsir
2013	(China) Chen Long	(Denmark) Tine Baun	(China) Liu Xiaolong (China) Qiu Zihan	(China) Wang Xiaoli (China) Yu Yang	(Indonesia) Tontowi Ahmad (Indonesia) Liliyana Natsir
2014	(Malaysia) Lee Chong Wei	(China) Wang Shixian	(Indonesia) Mohammad Ahsan (Indonesia) Hendra Setiawan	(China) Wang Xiaoli (China) Yu Yang	(Indonesia) Tontowi Ahmad (Indonesia) Liliyana Natsir
2015	(China) Chen Long	(Spain) Carolina Marín	(Denmark) Mathias Boe (Denmark) Carsten Mogensen	(China) Bao Yixin (China) Tang Yuanting	(China) Zhang Nan (China) Zhao Yunlei
2016	(China) Lin Dan	(Japan) Nozomi Okuhara	(Russia) Vladimir Ivanov (Russia) Ivan Sozonov	(Japan) Misaki Matsutomo (Japan) Ayaka Takahashi	(Indonesia) Praveen Jordan (Indonesia) Debby Susanto
2017	(Malaysia) Lee Chong Wei	(Chinese Taipei) Tai Tzu-ying	(Indonesia) Marcus Fernaldi Gideon (Indonesia) Kevin Sanjaya Sukamuljo	(South Korea) Chang Ye-na (South Korea) Lee So-hee	(China) Lu Kai (China) Huang Yaqiong
2018	(China) Shi Yuqi	(Chinese Taipei) Tai Tzu-ying	(Indonesia) Marcus Fernaldi Gideon (Indonesia) Kevin Sanjaya Sukamuljo	(Denmark) Kamilla Rytter Juhl (Denmark) Christinna Pedersen	(Japan) Yuta Watanabe (Japan) Arisa Higashino
2019	(Japan) Kento Momota	(China) Chen Yufei	(Indonesia) Mohammad Ahsan (Indonesia) Hendra Setiawan	(China) Chen Qingchen (China) Jia Yifan	(China) Zheng Siwei (China) Huang Yaqiong
2020	(Denmark) Viktor Axelsen	(Chinese Taipei) Tai Tzu-ying	(Japan) Hiroyuki Endo (Japan) Yuta Watanabe	(Japan) Yuki Fukushima (Japan) Sayaka Hirota	(Indonesia) Praveen Jordan (Indonesia) Melati Daeva Oktavianti
2021	(Malaysia) Lee Zii Jia	(Japan) Nozomi Okuhara	(Japan) Hiroyuki Endo (Japan) Yuta Watanabe	(Japan) Mayu Matsumoto (Japan) Wakana Nagahara	(Japan) Yuta Watanabe (Japan) Arisa Higashino
2022	(Denmark) Viktor Axelsen	(Japan) Akane Yamaguchi	(Indonesia) Muhammad Shohibul Fikri (Indonesia) Bagas Maulana	(Japan) Nami Matsuyama (Japan) Chiharu Shida	(Japan) Yuta Watanabe (Japan) Arisa Higashino
2023	(China) Li Shifeng	(South Korea) An Se-young	(Indonesia) Fajar Alfian (Indonesia) Muhammad Rian Ardianto	(South Korea) Kim So-yeong (South Korea) Kong Hee-yong	(China) Zheng Siwei (China) Huang Yaqiong
2024	(Indonesia) Jonatan Christie	(Spain) Carolina Marín	(Indonesia) Fajar Alfian (Indonesia) Muhammad Rian Ardianto	(South Korea) Baek Ha-na (South Korea) Lee So-hee	(China) Zheng Siwei (China) Huang Yaqiong
2025	(China) Shi Yuqi	(South Korea) An Se-young	(South Korea) Kim Won-ho (South Korea) Seo Seung-jae	(Japan) Nami Matsuyama (Japan) Chiharu Shida	(China) Guo Xinwa (China) Chen Fanghui
2026	(Chinese Taipei) Lin Chun-yi	(China) Wang Zhiyi	(South Korea) Kim Won-ho (South Korea) Seo Seung-jae	(China) Liu Shengshu (China) Tan Ning	(Chinese Taipei) Ye Hong-wei (Chinese Taipei) Nicole Gonzales Chan

== Multiple winners ==
Below is the list of the most successful players in the All England Open Badminton Championships:

Name	MS	WS	MD	WD	XD	Total
(England) George Alan Thomas	4		9		8	21
(Republic of Ireland) Frank Devlin	6		7		5	18
(United States) Judy Devlin (Note: Judy Devlin later known as Judy Hashman)		10		7		17
(England) Meriel Lucas		6		10	1	17
(Denmark) Finn Kobberø			7		8	15
(England) Betty Uber		1		4	8	13
(Denmark) Tonny Ahm (Note: Tonny Ahm formerly known as Tonny Olsen)		2		6	4	12
(England) Ethel Thomson (Note: Ethel Thomson later known as Larcombe)		5		4	2	11
(England) Margaret Tragett (Note: Margaret Tragett formerly known as Larminie)		3		5	3	11
(England) Hazel Hogarth				5	6	11
(Denmark) Erland Kops	7		4			11
(England) Gillian Gilks (Note: Gillian Gilks formerly known as Gillian Perrin and the latest was changed to Gillian Goodwin)		2		3	6	11
(Denmark) Kirsten Thorndahl (Note: Kirsten Thorndahl also known as Kirsten Granlund)		1		5	5	11
(China) Gao Ling				6	5	11
(England) Henry Norman Marrett	3		5		2	10
(Denmark) Ulla Strand (Note: Ulla Strand formerly known as Ulla Rasmussen)				3	7	10
(England) Ralph Nichols	5		3		1	9
(England) Donald C. Hume	1		4		4	9
(South Korea) Park Joo-bong			4		5	9
(South Korea) Chung Myung-hee				4	5	9
(England) Marjorie Barrett		5		4		9
(England) Kitty McKane (Note: Kitty McKane later known as Godfree)		4		2	2	8
(Republic of Ireland) Gordon Mack	1		6		1	8
(Indonesia) Rudy Hartono	8					8
(England) Nora Perry (Note: Nora Perry formerly known as Nora Gardner)				2	6	8
(England) Raymond M. White	2		4		1	7
(England) Thelma Kingsbury		2		4	1	7
(Malaysia) Eddy Choong	4		3			7
(England) Frank Chesterton	3		3			6
(England) Guy A. Sautter	3		1		2	6
(England) June Timperley (Note: June Timperley formerly known as June White)				3	3	6
(Denmark) Jørgen Hammergaard Hansen			6			6
(England) (Republic of Ireland) Sue Devlin (Note: Sue Devlin won her first three titles representing England then the next three representing Ireland)				6		6
(Indonesia) Tjun Tjun			6			6
(Indonesia) Johan Wahjudi			6			6
(South Korea) Ra Kyung-min				1	5	6
(South Korea) Kim Dong-moon			2		4	6
(China) Huang Sui				6		6
(China) Lin Dan	6					6
(England) Violet Elton				5		5
(Denmark) Poul Holm			1		4	5
(China) Ge Fei				4	1	5
(China) Yu Yang				4	1	5
(England) Susan Whetnall (Note: Susan Whetnall formerly known as Susan Pound)				3	2	5
(Japan) Hiroe Yuki		4		1		5
(Japan) Etsuko Toganoo (Note: Etsuko Toganoo formerly known as Etsuko Takenaka)		1		4		5
(Japan) Yuta Watanabe			2		3	5
(South Korea) Chung So-young				5		5
(England) F. S. Collier			3		1	4
(England) Norman Wood	2		1		1	4
(England) Albert Prebble			3		1	4
(England) G. L. Murray				3	1	4
(England) Lavinia Radeglia		3		1		4
(England) Herbert Uber			1		3	4
(England) Marje Henderson				4		4
(Malaysia) David Choong			3		1	4
(Malaysia) Wong Peng Soon	4					4
(England) Iris Rogers (Note: Iris Rogers formerly known as Iris Cooley)				3	1	4
(England) Tony Jordan					4	4
(Denmark) Svend Pri	1				3	4
(Denmark) Morten Frost	4					4
(South Korea) Hwang Hye-young				4		4
(Indonesia) Susi Susanti		4				4
(China) Gu Jun				4		4
(Malaysia) Lee Chong Wei	4					4
(China) Huang Yaqiong					4	4
(England) D. W. Oakes			1		2	3
(England) Daisy St. John				1	2	3
(England) Herbert Mellersh			3			3
(England) Stewart Marsden Massey			3			3
(England) Dorothy Cundall				2	1	3
(England) Margaret Stocks (Note: Margaret Stocks formerly known as Margaret McKane)		1		2		3
(England) Eveline Peterson				1	2	3
(England) Frank Hodge			3			3
(England) Leoni Kingsbury		2		1		3
(England) Leslie Nichols			3			3
(Denmark) Jørn Skaarup	1		1		1	3
(Denmark) Aase Schiøtt Jacobsen		2		1		3
(United States) Margaret Varner		2		1		3
(Denmark) Poul-Erik Nielsen			2		1	3
(Denmark) Henning Borch			3			3
(Malaysia) Ng Boon Bee			3			3
(England) Derek Talbot					3	3
(Japan) Machiko Aizawa				3		3
(Indonesia) Christian Hadinata			2		1	3
(Indonesia) Liem Swie King	3					3
(England) Mike Tredgett					3	3
(Sweden) Thomas Kihlström			2		1	3
(China) Li Lingwei		2		1		3
(South Korea) Kim Moon-soo			3			3
(China) Li Yongbo			3			3
(China) Tian Bingyi			3			3
(Denmark) Thomas Lund			1		2	3
(South Korea) Gil Young-ah				3		3
(China) Ye Zhaoying		3				3
(South Korea) Ha Tae-kwon			3			3
(China) Zhang Jun					3	3
(China) Xie Xingfang		3				3
(Denmark) Tine Baun		3				3
(China) Wang Xiaoli				3		3
(Indonesia) Tontowi Ahmad					3	3
(Indonesia) Liliyana Natsir					3	3
(China) Zhao Yunlei				1	2	3
(Chinese Taipei) Tai Tzu-ying		3				3
(Japan) Arisa Igarashi (Note: Arisa Igarashi formerly known as Arisa Higashino)					3	3
(China) Zheng Siwei					3	3
(England) Mary Graeme				2		2
(England) E. M. Moseley				1	1	2
(England) Ralph Watling	2					2
(England) Dorothea Douglass				1	1	2
(England) Edward Hawthorn			1		1	2
(England) Alice Gowenlock				2		2
(England) Muriel Bateman				2		2
(England) Marian Horsley				1	1	2
(England) Diana Doveton				2		2
(Denmark) Tage Madsen	1		1			2
(Denmark) Preben Dabelsteen			2			2
(Denmark) Marie Ussing		2				2
(Malaysia) Ooi Teik Hock			2			2
(England) Heather Ward		1		1		2
(Denmark) Karin Jørgensen				2		2
(Malaysia) Tan Yee Khan			2			2
(England) Margaret Boxall				2		2
(Sweden) Eva Twedberg		2				2
(Indonesia) Ade Chandra			2			2
(Indonesia) Imelda Wiguna				1	1	2
(England) Margaret Beck		1		1		2
(Denmark) Lene Køppen		2				2
(China) Zhang Ailing		2				2
(Indonesia) Rudy Heryanto			2			2
(Indonesia) Hariamanto Kartono			2			2
(China) Lin Ying				2		2
(China) Wu Dixi				2		2
(England) Martin Dew					2	2
(China) Han Aiping		1		1		2
(South Korea) Kim Yun-ja		1		1		2
(China) Zhao Jianhua	2					2
(Denmark) Jon Holst-Christensen			1		1	2
(Indonesia) Rudy Gunawan			2			2
(Indonesia) Hariyanto Arbi	2					2
(Denmark) Poul-Erik Høyer Larsen	2					2
(Indonesia) Ricky Subagja			2			2
(Indonesia) Rexy Mainaky			2			2
(Indonesia) Tony Gunawan			2			2
(China) Gong Zhichao		2				2
(Indonesia) Candra Wijaya			2			2
(China) Chen Hong	2					2
(Denmark) Jens Eriksen			2			2
(Denmark) Martin Lundgaard Hansen			2			2
(China) Zheng Bo					2	2
(China) Zhang Yawen				2		2
(China) Cai Yun			2			2
(China) Fu Haifeng			2			2
(China) Wang Shixian		2				2
(South Korea) Jung Jae-sung			2			2
(South Korea) Lee Yong-dae			2			2
(China) Zhang Nan					2	2
(Denmark) Mathias Boe			2			2
(Denmark) Carsten Mogensen			2			2
(China) Chen Long	2					2
(Indonesia) Marcus Fernaldi Gideon			2			2
(Indonesia) Kevin Sanjaya Sukamuljo			2			2
(Indonesia) Mohammad Ahsan			2			2
(Indonesia) Hendra Setiawan			2			2
(Indonesia) Praveen Jordan					2	2
(Japan) Hiroyuki Endo			2			2
(Japan) Nozomi Okuhara		2				2
(Denmark) Viktor Axelsen	2					2
(South Korea) Lee So-hee				2		2
(Spain) Carolina Marín		2				2
(Indonesia) Fajar Alfian			2			2
(Indonesia) Muhammad Rian Ardianto			2			2
(Japan) Nami Matsuyama				2		2
(Japan) Chiharu Shida				2		2
(China) Shi Yuqi	2					2
(South Korea) An Se-young		2				2
(South Korea) Kim Won-ho			2			2
(South Korea) Seo Seung-jae			2			2

In the modern era players are less able to compete in multiple disciplines due to the differentiation of required skills and the physical demands of the game. Some men's and women's doubles players are able to compete successfully in mixed doubles. The last player to win in both singles and a doubles discipline was Li Lingwei of China who won women's doubles in 1985 then in women's singles in 1989.

== Performances by nation ==
As of the 2026 edition

	Nation	MS	WS	MD	WD	XD	Total
1	England	27	39	28.5	46.5	53	194
2	China	22	23	6	25	16	92
3	Denmark	22	14	21	11	21	89
4	Indonesia	16	4	24	2	6	52
5	South Korea		5	12	14	10	41
6	Malaysia	15		11.5		0.5	27
7	Japan	1	9	2	11	3	26
8	Ireland	7		7.5	2	3.5	20
9	United States	1	12	0.5	4	1	18.5
10	Sweden	1	3	2		0.5	6.5
11	Chinese Taipei	1	3			1	5
12	India	2					2
12	Spain		2				2
14	Canada		1				1
14	Russia			1			1
16	Netherlands				0.5		0.5
16	Scotland					0.5	0.5
	Total	115	115	116	116	116	578

== See also ==
- List of All England men's singles champions
- List of All England women's singles champions
- List of All England men's doubles champions
- List of All England women's doubles champions
- List of All England mixed doubles champions
