= General Lucas =

General Lucas may refer to:

- Alfred Lucas (Indian Army officer) (1822–1896), British Indian Army general
- Charles Lucas (1613–1648), English Army general
- Cuthbert Lucas (1879–1958), British Army major general
- John P. Lucas (1890–1949), U.S. Army major general
- Robert Lucas (governor) (1781–1853), Ohio Militia brigadier general
- Steve Lucas (born 1952), Canadian Air Force lieutenant general

== See also ==
- Attorney General Lucas (disambiguation)
