= Henry Norman Marrett =

English badminton player

Henry Marrett
Personal information
- Born: 15 December 1879 India
- Died: 24 December 1961 (aged 82) India

Sport
- Country: England
- Sport: Badminton
Medal record
Representing ENG
All England Open Badminton Championships
Gold medal – first place	1904 London	singles
Gold medal – first place	1905 London	singles
Gold medal – first place	1908 London	singles
Gold medal – first place	1904 London	doubles
Gold medal – first place	1906 London	doubles
Gold medal – first place	1908 London	doubles
Gold medal – first place	1910 London	doubles
Gold medal – first place	1912 London	doubles
Gold medal – first place	1904 London	mixed
Gold medal – first place	1905 London	mixed

Henry Norman Marrett (born 15 December 1879 in Umballa) was a male badminton and tennis player from England.

Marrett won the All England Open Badminton Championships, considered the unofficial World Badminton Championships, in men's singles in 1904, 1905 and 1908.

Marrett also played tennis he competed at the 1904 Wimbledon Championships where he reached the second round before losing to Arthur Gore. He won two career singles titles at the Kent Coast Championships in 1903 held in Hythe, and the Essex Championships in 1920 held in .

He married fellow badminton player Florence Lannowe.
