= Attorney General Lucas =

Attorney General Lucas may refer to:

- Isaac Benson Lucas (1867–1940), Attorney General of Ontario
- Paul Lucas (politician) (born 1962), Attorney-General of Queensland

== See also ==
- General Lucas (disambiguation)
