= Daisy St John =

English badminton player

Daisy St. John
Personal information
- Born: 17 October 1877 Burma
- Died: 29 March 1956 (aged 78)

Sport
- Country: England
- Sport: Badminton

Julia Margaret "Daisy" St John (1877-1956) was an English international badminton player.

== Badminton career ==
Daisy born in 1877 was a three times winner of the All England Open Badminton Championships. She won the women's 1899 All England Badminton Championships and 1900 All England Badminton Championships mixed doubles and the 1901 All England Badminton Championships women's doubles.

The name Daisy was likely taken from her middle name Margaret. Her full name was Julia Margaret St.John. The evidence relating to her name is the fact that she was a member of the Ealing Club, as were her father Richard Fleming St Andrew St John (Honorary Secretary of the English Badminton Association), younger sister Catherine Frances Muriel St.John and older brother Richard Stukeley St.John. The latter two competed as a mixed doubles pairing at the 1900 All England Badminton Championships.
