= A. M. Head =

Irish badminton player

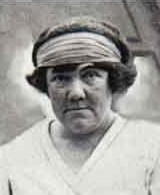
- Head as part of the Ireland v England Badminton 1923 Played at Royal Horticultural Hall, London

Personal information
- Born: c. 1895

Sport
- Country: Ireland
- Sport: Badminton

Mrs A. M. Head (born c. 1895) was an Irish badminton player.

== Biography ==
Mrs A. M. Head won the Irish Open in 1924, 1925 and 1927. In 1926 she was won the All England Open Badminton Championships, the first Irish woman to do so.
