= Alfred Lucas (Indian Army officer) =

Sir Alfred Lucas
- Born: Alfred William Lucas; 5 July 1822; Greenwich, London, England
- Died: 19 February 1896 (aged 73); Newton Abbot, Devon
- Relatives: Meriel Lucas (daughter)
- Military career
- Allegiance: United Kingdom
- Branch: British Indian Army
- Rank: General
- Conflicts: Anglo-Persian War; Indian Mutiny; Abyssinia Expedition.
- Awards: KCB

General Sir Alfred William Lucas KCB (5 July 1822 – 19 February 1896) was a senior British staff officer in the British Indian Army.

He was born 5 July 1822 and baptised on 3 August 1822 in St Alfege Church, Greenwich, London, the son of Charles and Elizabeth Lucas.

== Army career ==
He joined the Bombay Army as an ensign in 1838 and was promoted Lieutenant in 1840, Captain in 1852, Major in 1858, Lieutenant Colonel in 1864 and Colonel in 1868.

He took part in the Southern Mahratta Campaign of 1844-45, the Anglo-Persian War of 1856–59 and the Indian Mutiny of 1857–59. He was a staff officer in the Rajputana Field Force which pursued Tantia Topes forces through Rajputana in 1857. In 1867–68 he was appointed head of the Commissariat in the punitive Abyssinia Expedition of 1868 after which he served as Deputy Commissary General in Bombay until 1877.

He retired on half-pay in 1880, was promoted to Lieutenant-General in 1882 and made full general on 22 January 1889.

== Honours and awards ==
He was awarded CB in the 1869 Birthday Honours and elevated to KCB in the 1893 Birthday Honours.

== Private life ==
He married firstly on 27 June 1842 at Belgaum, Bombay, India, Mary Charlotte Fallon (circa 1815 - circa 1865). This marriage produced 2 sons; 1). Charles Arthur de Neufville, born 1846, Jersey, Channel Islands, UK. 2). Hugh Claude Edward born 1849, Bombay, India. He married secondly in 1867 Florence Caswell from New South Wales. He set up a family home in Devon where they raised a large family. He died there aged 73 in 1896. His daughter was the famous badminton player Meriel Lucas.
