= Herbert Mellersh =

English badminton player

Personal information
- Born: 16 October 1869 Milford, Surrey
- Died: 11 December 1947 (aged 78) Surrey

Sport
- Country: England
- Sport: Badminton

Herbert Lewis Mellersh (1869-1947), was a male badminton player from England.

== Badminton career ==
Mellersh born in Surrey was a three times winner of the All England Open Badminton Championships. He won the men's doubles in 1900, 1901 and 1902 with F. S. Collier He was a solicitor by trade.
