= 1955 All England Badminton Championships =

1955 All England Championships
Tournament details
- Dates: 23 March 1955– 26 March 1955
- Edition: 45th
- Venue: Empress Hall, Earls Court
- Location: London

The 1955 All England Championships was a badminton tournament held at the Empress Hall, Earls Court, London, England, from 23 to 26 March 1955.

== Final results ==
Category	Winners	Runners-up	Score
Men's singles	(Malaysia) Wong Peng Soon	(Malaysia) Eddy Choong	15–7, 14–17, 15–10
Women's singles	(United States) Margaret Varner	(United States) Judy Devlin	9-11, 11–5, 11–1
Men's doubles	(Denmark) Finn Kobberø & Jørgen Hammergaard Hansen	(Malaysia) Eddy Choong & David Ewe Choong	15-9, 15–17, 15–11
Women's doubles	(England) Iris Cooley & June White	(United States) Judy Devlin & Sue Devlin	18–15, 10–15, 15–9
Mixed doubles	(Denmark) Finn Kobberø & Kirsten Thorndahl	(Malaysia) David Ewe Choong & (England) June White	15–7, 15–13

== Results ==
=== Men's singles ===
==== Section 1 ====
Round of 32
(Malaysia) Wong Peng Soon	15	15
(England) B C Richards	1	2
(England) John Timperley	15	15
(Pakistan) Saeed Malik	16	10
(Denmark) Jørgen Hammergaard Hansen	15	8	15
(England) K C Carpenter	6	15	2
(England) Dick Hashman	15	10	18
(England) Michael Rawlings	12	15	16
(Sweden) Bertil Glans	15	15	15
(England) G R Oehlers	0	3	0
(England) W Goode	15	15
(England) M Robinson	12	3
(Malaysia) Johnny Heah	15	15
(England) D V Dickinson	2	2
(India) Vikram Bhat	15	15
(England) R McNeil	4	3

Round of 16
(Malaysia) Peng Soon	15	15
(England) Timperley	2	2
(Denmark) Hammegaard-H	15	15
(England) Hashman	7	10
(Sweden) Glans	15	15
(England) Goode	4	2
(Malaysia) Heah	15	15
(India) Bhat	10	6

Quarterfinals
(Malaysia) Peng Soon	17	15
(Denmark) Hammegaard-H	14	1
(Sweden) Glans	15	9	15
(Malaysia) Heah	0	15	10

Semifinals
(Malaysia) Peng Soon	15	18
(Sweden) Glans	6	13

==== Section 2 ====
Round of 32
(Malaysia) Eddy Choong	w/o
(France) Henri Pellizza
(England) Tony Jordan	8	15	15
(Republic of Ireland) James 'Chick' Doyle	15	6	13
(England) J A Broadhurst	15	15
(Norway) Hans Gustav Myrhe	10	13
(Sweden) Palle Granlund	15	1	15
(England) Hugh Findlay	5	15	12
(Denmark) Finn Kobberø	15	15
(Thailand) Y Limpa Amara	4	1
(Malaysia) Oon Chong Teik	15	15
(England) R Quiddington	12	7
(Malaysia) David Ewe Choong	15	15
(Wales) G E Rowlands	10	8
(Sweden) Berndt Dahlberg	15	15
(England) D P Hepworth	1	8

Round of 16
(Malaysia) Choong E	15	15
(England) Jordan	7	7
(England) Broadhurst	w/o
(Sweden) Granlund
(Denmark) Kobberø	15	15
(Malaysia) Teik	2	5
(Malaysia) Choong D	12	15	15
(Sweden) Dahlberg	15	6	4

Quarterfinals
(Malaysia) Choong E	15	15
(England) Broadhurst	5	3
(Denmark) Kobberø	15	15
(Malaysia) Choong D	5	8

Semifinals
(Malaysia) Choong E	17	15
(Denmark) Kobberø	14	1

=== Women's singles ===
Round of 16
(United States) Margaret Varner	11	11
(England) Audrey Stone	0	1
(Denmark) Tonny Ahm	11	11
(England) H C Parfitt	0	0
(England) Iris Cooley	12	11	11
(England) Heather Ward	10	12	6
(England) J Waring	9	12	11
(England) P Warner	12	10	5
(United States) Judy Devlin	11	11
(Scotland) Nancy Horner	0	1
(England) June White	11	11
(England) S M Spreadborough	2	4
(Canada) Marjory Shedd	11	11
(England) Ruth Page	4	3
(United States) Sue Devlin	11	9	11
(England) A N J Marshall	6	11	1

Quarterfinals
(United States) Varner	12	11
(Denmark) Ahm	10	4
(England) Cooley	7	11	11
(England) Waring	11	4	4
(United States) Devlin J	11	11
(England) White	4	1
(Canada) Shedd	11	11
(United States) Devlin S	8	4

Semifinals
(United States) Varner	11	11
(England) Cooley	7	8
(United States) Devlin	11	11
(Canada) Shedd	1	0

Final
(United States) Varner	9	11	11
(United States) Devlin	11	5	1
