= Richard Fleming St Andrew St John =

British orientalist

Richard Fleming St Andrew St John (1839–1919) of Ealing was an English orientalist.

St John's works include readers and guides to the Burmese language, and papers and correspondence in journals of folklore and 'Asiatic studies'. Manuscripts and letters of William Stukeley were held in his library.

He was the Honorary Secretary of the English Badminton Association in 1899.
