= Meriel Lucas =

English badminton player

Personal information
- Born: 1877 Teignmouth, Devon
- Died: 1962 (aged 84–85) Newton Abbot, Devon

Sport
- Country: England
- Sport: Badminton

Emily Muriel Lucas also known as Meriel Lucas (1877 – 1962) was an English badminton player. Lucas from Devon was capped by England on only seven occasions between 1902 and 1909 but won a remarkable 17 All England titles.

Lucas played for the Teignmouth Badminton Club.

Her parents were Sir Alfred William Lucas and Dame Florence Emma Casswell. After marrying George Adams in 1911 Lucas retired from competition.

== Medal Record at the All England Badminton Championships ==
Medal	Year	Event
Gold medal – first place	1899	Women's doubles
Gold medal – first place	1900	Women's doubles
Gold medal – first place	1902	Women's singles
Gold medal – first place	1902	Women's doubles
Gold medal – first place	1904	Women's doubles
Gold medal – first place	1905	Women's singles
Gold medal – first place	1905	Women's doubles
Gold medal – first place	1906	Women's doubles
Gold medal – first place	1907	Women's singles
Gold medal – first place	1907	Women's doubles
Gold medal – first place	1908	Women's singles
Gold medal – first place	1908	Women's doubles
Gold medal – first place	1908	Mixed doubles
Gold medal – first place	1909	Women's singles
Gold medal – first place	1909	Women's doubles
Gold medal – first place	1910	Women's singles
Gold medal – first place	1910	Women's doubles
