= Stewart Marsden Massey =

English badminton player

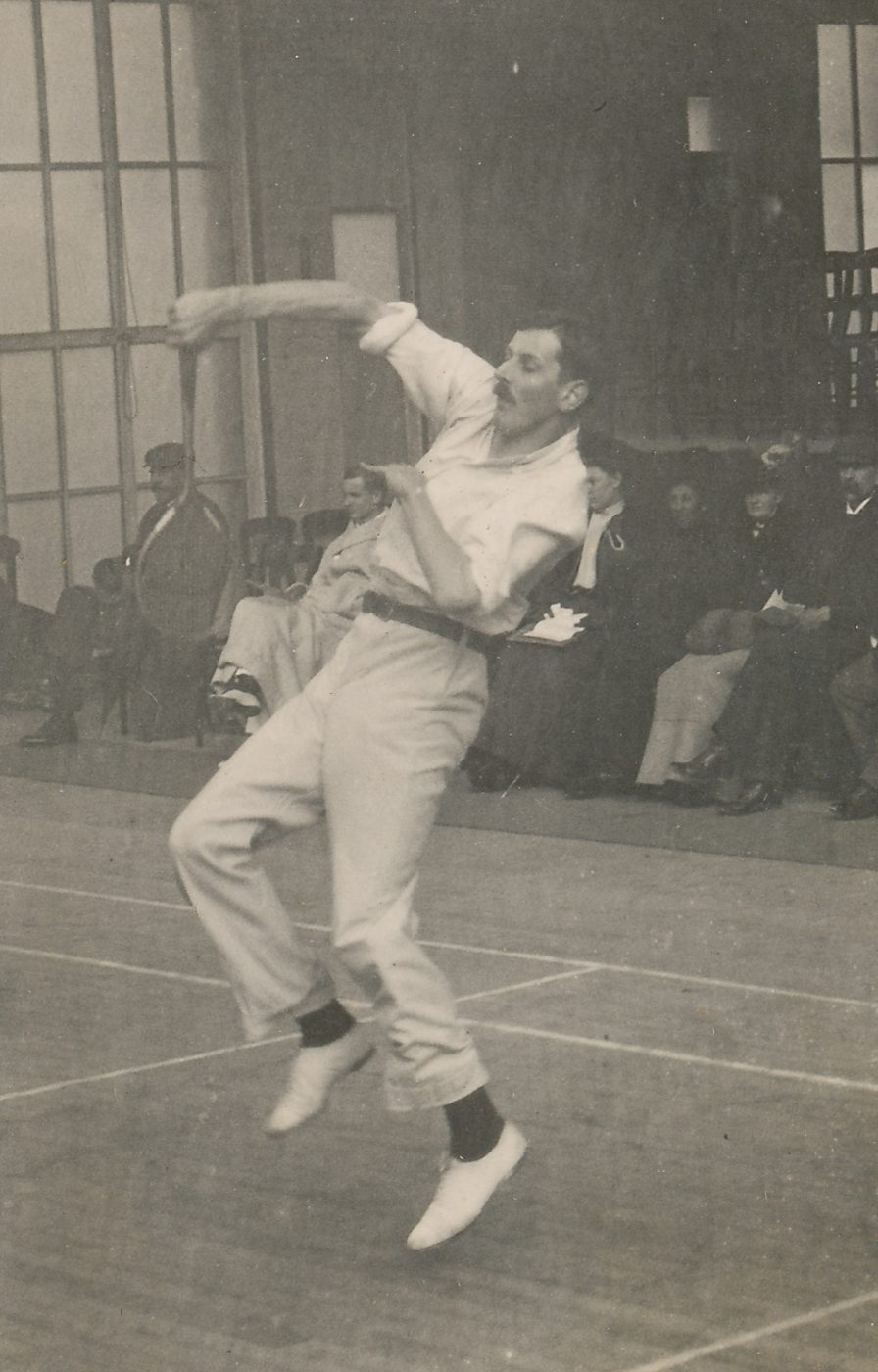
- Massey, c. 1908

Personal information
- Born: Second Quarter 1877 Kensington
- Died: 31 July 1934 West Ealing

Sport
- Country: England
- Sport: Badminton
- Handedness: Right

Stewart Marsden Massey (1877–1934), was a badminton player from England, and writer who wrote the first book solely devoted to badminton.

== Badminton ==
Massey was born in Kensington and was a three time winner of the All England Open Badminton Championships. He won the first edition of the men's doubles during 1899 and then won two more titles in 1903 and 1905. He also competed in the first international badminton tournament outside the UK, in Dieppe, France.

== Writing ==
Massey wrote for the Badminton Magazine (e.g. February 1907), and the Badminton Gazette, of which he was, from November 1907, the founding editor, eventually being succeeded by George Thomas.

His 1911 book, Badminton, was the first on the sport. He was also the author of the entry on badminton in the 11th edition of Encyclopædia Britannica, also published in 1911.
