= Ralph Watling =

English badminton player

Personal information
- Born: 12 September 1872 Great Yarmouth, England
- Died: 10 May 1951 (aged 78) Acle, England

Sport
- Country: England
- Sport: Badminton
Medal record
Representing ENG
All England Open Badminton Championships
Gold medal – first place	1902 London	singles
Gold medal – first place	1903 London	singles

Ralph George Watling (12 September 1872 – 10 May 1951) was a male badminton player from England.

Watling won the All England Open Badminton Championships in men's singles in 1902 and 1903.
