= George William Vidal =

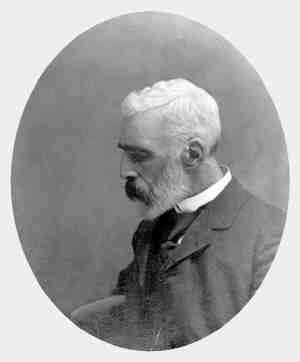
Photograph of Vidal taken by himself

George William Vidal (23 September 1845 – 13 October 1907) was a British lawyer who worked in the Indian Civil Services in the Bombay Presidency and contributed to natural history studies from the Konkan region, and was involved in popularizing the modern form of badminton in India and in establishing the formal rules of the game. He observed and collected bird and snake specimens and collaborated with other naturalists in the region. A couple of bird subspecies are named after him.

== Biography ==
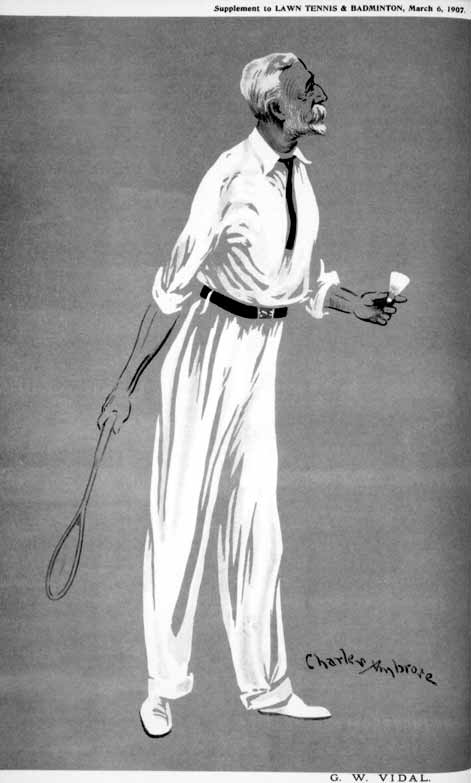
Vidal in later life, cartoon by Charles Ambrose

George William, the fifth son of Reverend Francis Vidal and the acclaimed novelist Mary Theresa, was born at Torrington, Devon. Reverend Vidal was a dominie in Eton and later vicar of Sutton, Suffolk. Vidal went to Eton College from 1854 to 1861, and was active in sports, winning the double sculls in 1860. He then became an associate of King's College and studied law with a thesis on "Law of Evidence and Notes on Cases Reported". He joined the Indian Civil Services after passing the exam in 1865, and reached India in October 1867 becoming assistant collector in Bombay. He was called to the bar at Lincoln's Inn in 1877. He served in a number of positions including forest settlement officer, member of the mixed commission, Goa (1880, 85), president of the Bombay Forest Commission (1885), collector and magistrate in the Panch Mahals, political agent for Rewa Kantha, collector of salt revenue in Bombay (1888), chief secretary from 1895, and retired in 1897. On returning to England he was a member of the governing body of the Imperial Institute.

== Badminton ==
Vidal introduced the game of badminton in the Bombay Presidency, playing the first ever game there in Satara on 10 July 1873. He was involved in the establishment of the formal rules of the game in Poona in 1875. After retiring from India, he joined the English Badminton Association becoming honorary secretary and treasurer from 1897, succeeding Major S. S. C. Dolby. This was followed by a period of rapid growth in the game. He won the All England Veteran Badminton Doubles Championships thrice. He played in and helped organise the 1899 All England Badminton Championships which was the first edition of the event.

== Natural history ==
Vidal was a keen naturalist, an amateur photographer, a talented guitarist, singer, and a motorcar enthusiast. He contributed numerous notes on the birds of the Konkan region to Allan Octavian Hume's journal Stray Feathers. He collected specimens of birds which were sent to Hume and a few subspecies have been named after him including Perdicula asiatica vidali and Todiramphus chloris vidali. He later contributed to the Journal of the Bombay Natural History Society. He was a fellow of the Zoological Society of London from 1897.

== Personal life ==
Vidal married Cecilia Palmer (died 1933) daughter of Lt. William Chapman, Bombay Engineers, on 2 January 1871 in Ratnagiri. They had two daughters Norah (1872-1939) and Winifred and a son Hugh. Norah Frances married Brig-Gen. Robert Mitchell Betham (2 May 1864 – 14 March 1940) who was also a keen ornithologist who was influenced in his boyhood by Vidal. Winifred married Henry Oliphant Selby on 13 September 1898. Vidal died at "Torrington", West Hill, Sydenham and was buried in Elmer's End on 16 October 1907.
