= Leonard Ransford =

English badminton player

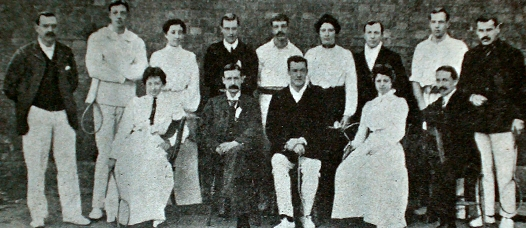

Personal information
- Born: 30 May 1880 Brixton
- Died: 27 April 1954 (aged 73) London

Sport
- Country: England
- Sport: Badminton

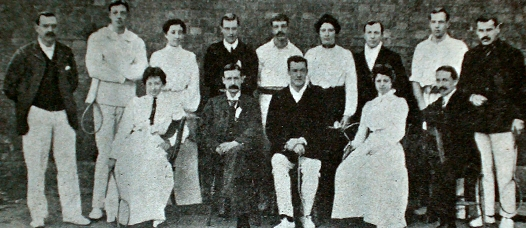
First International Badminton Match ever - England (E) vs. Ireland (I) 1903: Standing, left to right B. Hamilton (I), L. U. Ransford (E), Miss Carroll (later Mrs T. D. Good) (I), A. P. Dawson (I), G. A. Thomas (E), Miss M. Lucas (E), J. F. Stokes (I), G. Lucas (E), Dr. T. D. Good (I) Seated: Miss M. Obre (I), C. P. R. James (I), A. D. Prebble (E), Miss Muriel Hardy (E), W. S. C. Crawley (I).

Leonard Urban Ransford (1880-1954), was a male badminton player from England.

== Badminton career ==
Ransford who was born in Brixton, was a winner of the All England Open Badminton Championships. He won the mixed doubles in 1902.
