= Mary Graeme =

British badminton player

Personal information
- Born: 1875 Scotland
- Died: 18 January 1951 (aged 75–76) Torquay, England

Sport
- Country: England
- Sport: Badminton

Mary Violet Graeme (1875-1951) was a British international badminton player.

== Badminton career ==
Graeme was a winner of the All England Open Badminton Championships. She won the women's 1899 All England Badminton Championships doubles.
