= Ellen Mary Stawell-Brown =

English tennis and badminton player

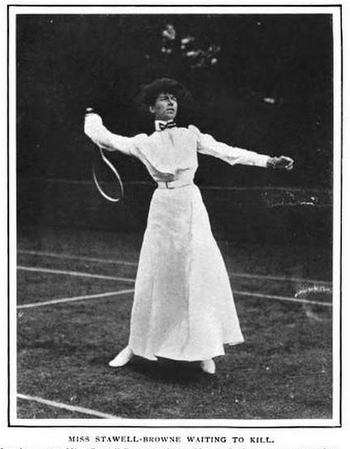
- Ellen Mary Stawell-Brown, from a 1904 magazine

Personal information
- Nationality: British
- Born: 1878
- Died: 1958
- Spouse: Edmund Spencer Hemsted

Sport
- Country: United Kingdom
- Sport: Badminton, Tennis

Ellen Mary Stawell-Brown (married name Ellen Hemsted) (1878–1958) was a British female badminton and tennis player. She has notably competed mainly in the All England Open Badminton Championships and Wimbledon Championships. Ellen Mary is the first woman ever to serve overarm in the Ladies' singles at the Wimbledon Championships.

Ellen Mary Stawell-Brown represented United Kingdom simultaneously in both international badminton competitions and Tennis competitions during the early 20th century (in 1900s). She competed at the Wimbledon Championships in 1901, 1902, 1903, 1904 and 1905.

Her notable achievement including the mixed doubles title victory along with F. S. Collier at the 1901 All England Badminton Championships. She also competed at the 1906 All England Badminton Championships.

Ellen's great grandson, Tim Henman, is a popular retired tennis player and former World No. 4 in singles. Her daughter Susan Hemsted, son-in-law Henry Billington and granddaughter Jane Henman also played at international level.
