= Mabel Hardy (badminton) =

English badminton player

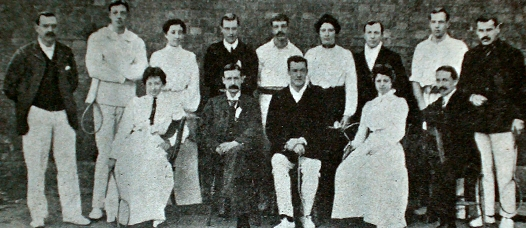

Personal information
- Born: Q1 1879 Lymington, Hampshire
- Died: 7 February 1947 (aged 67-68) Cheltenham, Gloucestershire

Sport
- Country: England
- Sport: Badminton

Mabel Constance Hardy married name Mabel Smith (1879-1947) was an English international badminton player.

== Badminton career ==
Hardy was a winner of the All England Open Badminton Championships after winning the women's 1903 All England Badminton Championships doubles with Dorothea Douglass Lambert Chambers. She was also a singles and mixed doubles finalist at the 1905 All England Badminton Championships.

Additionally she won the Irish Open doubles in 1903 and mixed doubles in 1903 and 1904. After marrying Lionel Smith in 1905 she competed under her married name of Smith.
