= Buckingham Gate =

Street in Westminster London, England

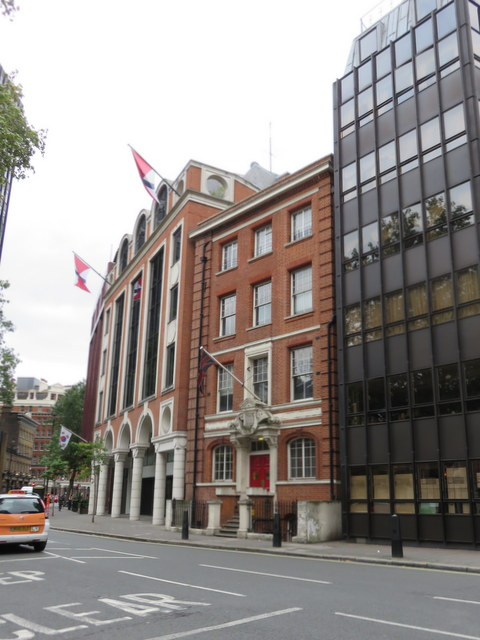
- Buildings on Buckingham Gate

- Location within Greater London
- Location: Westminster London, England
- Coordinates: 51°29′55″N 0°08′16″W
- North-west end: Buckingham Palace Road
- South-east end: Victoria Street

Buckingham Gate is a street in Westminster, London, England, near Buckingham Palace. It contains a number of embassies, hotels and businesses, and since September 2025, includes Liberal Democrat Headquarters, housing one of Parliament's three largest political parties, which is based at 66 Buckingham Gate.

The roadways of Buckingham Gate were first constructed in 1680, but were known by different names. Prior to 1820, the name of Buckingham Gate referred to an actual gate with a gatehouse and a gate guard, controlling access to the Queen's Palace and the Wellington Barracks, situated on the border of Queen's Garden and St James Park. The eastern portion of the modern Buckingham Gate was once known as Stafford Row and the Queens' Wards. The western portion was known as James Street. Prior to 1828, the eastern portion was reserved exclusively for use by members of the royal family.

== Location ==
At the north-west end is a junction with Buckingham Palace Road and Birdcage Walk opposite Buckingham Palace. At the south-east end is a junction with Victoria Street. The Wellington Barracks are to the north-east. The street is designated as part of the B323 road.

== Transport ==
The nearest London Underground stations are London Victoria station and St James's Park tube station; both are close to the south-east end of the street.

== History ==
The Buckingham Gate drill halls stood at No. 58 and No. 59. No. 59 was the regimental headquarters of the London Scottish and also served as the location for the British Wreck Commissioner's inquiry into the sinking of the RMS Titanic in 1912.

== Embassies ==
There are a number of diplomatic missions on the road:

- No. 20 – High Commission of Eswatini
- No. 60 – South Korean Embassy
- No. 75-88 – Embassy of North Macedonia

== Businesses ==
There are several restaurants in Buckingham Gate. Currently, there is Bistro at the St. James Court, A Taj Hotel London St. James, the Quilon Restaurant at No. 41, The Zander cocktail bar is at No. 45, and Bongusto Italian restaurant at No. 75.

- No. 51 is The Taj 51 Buckingham Gate Suites and Residences, a five-star hotel.
- No. 57 – Savills Westminster.
- No. 58 is Sassoon Academy.
- No. 59 is Swire House, accommodating the Britain–Australia Society and the Hong Kong Association and Society.
- No. 62 is the Rolls-Royce Group PLC headquarters.
