= 1908 All England Badminton Championships =

Tournament details
- Dates: 3 March 1908– 7 March 1908
- Edition: 10th
- Venue: London Rifle Brigade Drill Hall
- Location: 130 Bunhill Row, Islington, London
- Official website: All England Championships

The 1908 All England Open Badminton Championships was a badminton tournament held at the London Rifle Brigade HQ, Islington, London, England, from March 3 to March 7, 1908.

Meriel Lucas won her fourth women's singles title and Henry Norman Marrett won his third men's singles title, the former reverted to a first to 11 points game format. Lucas also won her seventh women's doubles crown and second with G. L. Murray and she also won her first mixed doubles title partnering Norman Wood.

In the men's doubles F. Warner was listed as playing, it is believed to be Frank Abbatt playing under his middle name. This started the unusual occurrence of other players playing under assumed names in future years. The reason for this happening or being allowed is unknown.

== Final results ==
Category	Winners	Runners-up	Score
Men's singles	(England) Henry Marrett	(Republic of Ireland) Arthur Cave	12-15 18-14 15-9
Women's singles	(England) Meriel Lucas	(England) G. L. Murray	11-2 11-3
Men's doubles	(England) Sir George Thomas & Henry Marrett	(England) Frank Chesterton & Stewart Massey	16-18 18-13 15-4
Women's doubles	(England) Meriel Lucas & G. L. Murray	(England) Alice Gowenlock & Dorothy Cundall	15-4 15-5
Mixed doubles	(England) Norman Wood & Meriel Lucas	(England) Sir George Thomas & G. L. Murray	15-9 15-3
Mixed doubles Handicap (1st Class)	(England) R. G. P. Hunter & Mina Hassell (née Schreiber) (+8)	(England) Guy Sautter & G. L. Murray (scratch)	15-8, 15-7
Mixed doubles Handicap (2nd Class)	(England) R. J. West & M. E. Mayston (+8)	(England) A. L. Bentley & Constance Peterson (+2)	15-8, 15-7
Veterans' doubles Handicap	(England) W. Cobbett & C. A. Turner (+4)	(England) Col. G. W. Deane & C. G. Eames (+3)	15-8, 9-15, 17-16

== Men's singles ==
First Round
(England) Henry Marrett
bye
(England) George Thomas
bye
(England) Guy Sautter
bye
(Republic of Ireland) William Cave
bye
(England) Frank Chesterton
bye
(Republic of Ireland) Robert Plews
bye
(England) Hugh Comyn
bye
(Republic of Ireland) R. D. Orr
bye
(England) Norman Wood
bye
(Scotland) H. J. H. Inglis
bye
(England) Edward Hawthorn
bye
(Republic of Ireland) Frederick A. Kennedy
bye
(Republic of Ireland) Arthur Cave
bye
(England) R. P. G. Hunter	15	15
(England) A. W. Andrews	4	12
(England) J. H. Colin Prior
bye
(England) Capt. D. M. Oakes
bye

Second round
(England) Marrett	15	15
(England) Thomas	7	10
(England) Sautter	15	4	15
(Republic of Ireland) Cave W	9	15	8
(England) Chesterton	15	15
(Republic of Ireland) Plews	4	0
(England) Comyn	15	4	w/o
(Republic of Ireland) Orr	6	1	ret
(England) Wood	15	15
(Scotland) Inglis	7	8
(England) Hawthorn	15	15
(Republic of Ireland) Kennedy	12	6
(Republic of Ireland) Cave A	15	15
(England) Hunter	2	5
(England) Prior	15	15
(England) Oakes	3	2

Quarter finals
(England) Marrett	15	15
(England) Sautter	5	3
(England) Chesterton	15	15
(England) Comyn	8	9
(England) Wood	15	13	15
(England) Hawthorn	8	15	9
(Republic of Ireland) Cave	15	15
(England) Prior	9	4

Semi finals
(England) Marrett	5	15	15
(England) Chesterton	15	9	11
(England) Wood	15	3	6
(Republic of Ireland) Cave	6	15	15

Final
(England) Marrett	12	18	15
(Republic of Ireland) Cave	15	14	9

== Women's singles ==
Round of 8
(England) Meriel Lucas
(England)
(England) Lavinia Radeglia
(England) Muriel Bateman
(England) G. L. Murray
(England) Dorothy Cundall
(England) Margaret Larminie
(England) Mabel Smith

Semifinals
(England) Lucas	11	11
(England) Radeglia	0	4
(England) Murray	11	11
(England) Larminie	8	5

Final
(England) Lucas	11	11
(England) Murray	2	3

== Men's doubles ==
First round
(England) Henry Marrett & George Thomas	15	16	15
(England) R. P. G. Hunter & Guy Sautter	13	18	6
(England) Albert Prebble & Norman Wood	15	15
(England) Hugh Comyn & F. Warner+	2	3
(Scotland) H. J. H Inglis & (England) D. M. Oakes
bye
(Republic of Ireland) G.Blood & R. D. Orr
bye
(England) Frank Chesterton & Stewart Massey	15	2	15
(Republic of Ireland) Arthur Cave & William Cave	13	15	10
(England) E. P. Harrison & R. Franck	15	15
(Republic of Ireland) Frederick A. Kennedy & Robert Plews	7	12
(England) Edward Hawthorn & Kerr
bye
(England) Henry Hetley & R. D. Marshal
bye

Quarter-finals
(England) Marrett & Thomas	15	11	15
(England) Prebble & Wood	6	15	11
(Scotland) Inglis & (England) Oakes	15	15
(Republic of Ireland) Blood & Orr	9	13
(England) Chesterton & Massey	15	9	15
(England) Harrison & Franck	9	15	1
(England) Hawthorn & Kerr	10	18	15
(England) Hetley & Marshal	15	15	8

Semi-finals
(England) Marrett & Thomas	15	15
(Scotland) Inglis & (England) Oakes	1	12
(England) Chesterton & Massey	15	18
(England) Hawthorn & Kerr	9	4

Final
(England) Marrett & Thomas	16	18	15
(England) Chesterton & Massey	18	13	4

+alias

== Women's doubles ==
Round of 8
(England) Meriel Lucas & G. L. Murray	15	15
(England) Mrs Binyon & Florence Lannowe	6	0
(England) Lavinia Radeglia & Margaret Larminie	15	14	17
(England) Muriel Bateman & Hazel Hogarth	7	18	14
(England) Dorothy Cundall & Alice Gowenlock	15	15
(England) Mina Hassell & Frances Drake	5	1
(England) Mabel Smith & Dora Boothby	15	12	15
(England) Mrs Wood & Miss Kearns	4	15	12

Semifinals
(England) Lucas & Murray	15	3	15
(England) Larminie & Radeglia	11	15	2
(England) Cundall & Gowenlock	15	17
(England) Smith & Boothby	7	15

Final
(England) Lucas & Murray	15	15
(England) Cundall & Gowenlock	4	5

== Mixed doubles ==
First round
(England) Norman Wood & Meriel Lucas	14	17	15
(England) Henry Marrett & Hazel Hogarth	15	16	9
bye
(England) J. D. Orr & Dorothy Cundall
bye
(Republic of Ireland) Frederick A. Kennedy & Louisa Kennedy
bye
(England) Guy Sautter & Alice Gowenlock
bye
(England) R. G. P. Hunter & Mina Hassell
bye
(England) Edward Hawthorn & Mrs N Wood
bye
(England) Capt. D. M. Oakes & Mabel Smith
bye
(England) George Thomas & G. L. Murray	15	15
(England) Albert Prebble & Dora Boothby	11	7
(Republic of Ireland) Arthur Cave & (England) Margaret Larminie
bye
(England) E. P. Harrison & Florence Lannowe	15	15
(Republic of Ireland) Robert Plews & (England) Frances Drake	7	7
(Scotland) H. J. H Inglis & (England) Muriel Bateman
bye
(England) Percy Fitton & Lavinia Radeglia
bye
(England) J. H. Colin Prior & Eveline Peterson
bye
(Republic of Ireland) William Cave & (England) Dorothy Lyon
bye
(England) R. J. West & M. E. Mayston
bye

Second round
(England) Wood & Lucas
(England) Orr & Cundall	15	15
(Republic of Ireland) Kennedy & Kennedy	4	8
(England) Sautter & Gowenlock	15	12
(England) Hunter & Hassell	15	10
(England) Hawthorn & Wood	15	15
(England) Oakes & Smith	6	12
(England) Thomas & Murray
(Republic of Ireland) A Cave & (England) Larminie
(Scotland) Inglis & (England) Bateman
(England) Harrison & Lannowe
(England) Fitton & Radeglia	11	15	15
(England) Prior & Peterson	15	8	11
(Republic of Ireland) Cave & (England) Lyon	15	17	15
(England) West & Mayston	9	18	2

Quarter-finals
(England) Wood & Lucas	15	17
(England) Orr & Cundall	7	14
(England) Sautter & Gowenlock	7	15	15
(England) Hawthorn & Wood	15	4	8
(England) Thomas & Murray	15	15
(Scotland) Inglis & (England) Bateman	10	5
(England) Fitton & Radeglia	15	15
(Republic of Ireland) W Cave & (England) Lyon	5	11

Semi-finals
(England) Wood & Lucas
(England) Sautter & Gowenlock
(England) Thomas & Murray	15	15
(England) Fitton & Radeglia	12	10

Final
(England) Wood & Lucas	15	15
(England) Thomas & Murray	9	3
