= 1910 All England Badminton Championships =

Tournament details
- Dates: 2 March 1910– 5 March 1910
- Edition: 12th
- Venue: Royal Horticultural Hall
- Location: Elverton Street, Westminster, London
- Official website: All England Championships

The 1910 All England Open Badminton Championships was a badminton tournament held at the Royal Horticultural Hall, Westminster, England from March 2 to March 5, 1910.

After seven years at the London Rifle Brigade's headquarters the Championships switched to a new venue at the Royal Horticultural Hall which provided five courts. There were just six entries for the women's singles, which saw Meriel Lucas win her sixth singles title. Frank Chesterton successfully defended his singles title.

== Final results ==
Category	Winners	Runners-up	Score
Men's singles	(England) Frank Chesterton	(England) Henry Marrett	15–4, 15–10
Women's singles	(England) Meriel Lucas	(England) Margaret Larminie	11–5, 3-11, 11-5
Men's doubles	(England) Sir George Thomas & Henry Marrett	(England) Frank Chesterton & Albert Prebble	15–4, 12–15, 15–12
Women's doubles	(England) Meriel Lucas & Muriel Bateman	(England) Dorothea Lambert-Chambers & Dorothy Lyon	15–8, 15–8
Mixed doubles	(England) Guy Sautter & Dorothy Cundall	(England) Frank Chesterton & Meriel Lucas	7–15, 15–9, 15–10

== Men's singles ==
First round
(England) Frank Chesterton	15	15
(England) L. D. Bayne	11	6
(England) George Thomas	15	15
(Republic of Ireland) Gerrard Gorges	2	7
(England) J. H. Colin Prior	15	15
(Scotland) Thomas L. Adam	2	9
(England) Guy Sautter	15	18
(Scotland) Dr. James Crombie	10	14
(England) Henry Marrett	15	15
(Republic of Ireland) Francis O'Brien Kennedy	3	11
(England) Hugh Comyn	15	15
(England) H Close	6	6
(Republic of Ireland) Frederick A Kennedy	15	15
(England) J. H. Coutts	11	2
(England) A. W. Andrews	15	15
(Republic of Ireland) Robert Plews	1	6

Quarter finals
(England) Chesterton	15	15
(England) Thomas	6	9
(England) Prior	15	4	15
(England) Sautter	10	15	4
(England) Marrett	15	15
(England) Comyn	2	11
(Republic of Ireland) Kennedy	15	15
(England) Andrews	7	9

Semi finals
(England) Chesterton	17	15
(England) Prior	16	11
(England) Marrett	15	15
(Republic of Ireland) Kennedy	5	11

Final
(England) Chesterton	15	15
(England) Marrett	4	10

== Women's singles ==
First round
(England) Meriel Lucas
bye
(England) Lavinia Radeglia	11	11
(England) Dorothea Lambert Chambers	4	5
(England) Margaret Larminie
bye
(England) Muriel Bateman	14	4	11
(England) Dorothy Lyon	10	11	2

Semi finals
(England) Lucas	11	8	11
(England) Radeglia	3	11	6
(England) Larminie	13	11
(England) Bateman	11	3

Final
(England) Lucas	11	3	11
(England) Larminie	5	11	5

== Men's doubles ==
First round
(England) George Thomas & Henry Marrett
bye
(Republic of Ireland) R. H. Lambert & Robert Plews
bye
(England) Hugh Comyn & (Republic of Ireland) Bert Bisgood	15	15
(England) R. Franck & E. P. Harrison	10	5
(Scotland) Dr. James Crombie & H. J. H. Inglis	18	15
(England) A. W. Andrews & (Scotland) W. D. Bayne	13	8
(England) Frank Chesterton & Albert Prebble
bye
(England) Percy Fitton & Edward Hawthorn	15	15
(Republic of Ireland) Frederick A. Kennedy & Francis O'Brien Kennedy	7	9
(England) Stewart Massey & Guy Sautter
bye
(England) Capt. Hay & (Republic of Ireland) Gerrard Gorges
bye

Quarter finals
(England) Thomas & Marrett	w/o
(Republic of Ireland) Lambert & Plews	scr
(England) Comyn & (Republic of Ireland) Bisgood	15	18
(Scotland) Crombie & Inglis	10	14
(England) Chesterton & Prebble	15	15
(England) Fitton & Hawthorn	13	9
(England) Massey & Sautter	15	15
(England) Hay & (Republic of Ireland) Gorges	7	4

Semi finals
(England) Thomas & Marrett	10	15	15
(England) Comyn & (Republic of Ireland) Bisgood	15	6	10
(England) Chesterton & Prebble	15	15
(England) Massey & Sautter	10	10

Final
(England) Thomas & Marrett	15	12	15
(England) Chesteron & Prebble	4	15	12

== Women's doubles ==
First round
(England) Meriel Lucas & Muriel Bateman	15	15
(England) Dora Boothby & Margaret Larminie	6	1
(England) Dorothy Cundall & Alice Gowenlock	15	15
(Republic of Ireland) Miss Hazlett & Louisa Kennedy	0	3
(England) Dorothea Lambert Chambers & Dorothy Lyon	15	15
(Scotland) H. Longmuir & V. I.Todd	3	9
(England) Lavinia Radeglia & Christina Douglass
bye

Semi finals
(England) Lucas & Bateman	15	15
(England) Cundall & Gowenlock	8	2
(England) Lambert Chambers & Lyon	15	12	15
(England) Radeglia & Douglass	5	15	11

Final
(England) Lucas & Bateman	15	15
(England) Lambert Chambers & Lyon	8	8

== Mixed doubles ==
First round
(England) Guy Sautter & Dorothy Cundall	15	15
(Scotland) Dr. James Crombie & V. I. Todd	0	0
(Republic of Ireland) Frederick A. Kennedy & Louisa Kennedy	15	10	15
(Scotland) W. D. Bayne & (Republic of Ireland) C. Johnstone	10	15	7
(England) Stewart Massey & Margaret Larminie
bye
(England) Capt. Hay & Miss Pakenham
bye
(England) Edward Hawthorn & Constance Peterson
bye
(Scotland) H. J. H Inglis & Miss H. Longmuir
bye
(England) J. H. Colin Prior & Eveline Peterson
bye
bye
(England) Frank Chesterton & Meriel Lucas
bye
(England) Percy Fitton & Lavinia Radeglia
bye
(England) Mackie+ & Dorothea Lambert Chambers
bye
(England) A. W. Andrews & Winton
bye
(England) George Thomas & Muriel Bateman	15	15
(England) Albert Prebble & Dora Boothby	11	9
(England) Hugh Comyn & Mrs Wood	15	15
(Republic of Ireland) Robert Plews & (England) Dorothy Lyon	7	11
(England) Henry Marrett & Florence Marrett (née Lannowe)
bye
(Republic of Ireland) Gerrard Gorges & (England) Alice Gowenlock
bye

Second round
(England) Sautter & Cundall	15	15
(Republic of Ireland) Kennedy & Kennedy	8	9
(England) Massey & Larminie	15	15
(England) Hay & Pakenham	4	9
(England) Hawthorn & Peterson	15	15
(Scotland) Inglis & Longmuir	4	6
(England) Prior & Peterson
(England) Chesterton & Lucas	15	15
(England) Fitton & Radeglia	10	12
(England) Mackie+ & Chambers	w/o
(England) Andrews & Winton	scr
(England) Thomas & Bateman	17	15
(England) Comyn & Wood	14	5
(England) Marrett & Marrett	11	15	17
(Republic of Ireland) Gorges & (England) Gowenlock	15	5	16

Quarter-finals
(England) Sautter & Cundall	15	17
(England) Massey & Larmnie	11	14
(England) Hawthorn & Peterson	15	15
(England) Prior & Peterson	12	4
(England) Chesterton & Lucas	15	18
(England) Mackie+ & Chambers	10	16
(England) Thomas & Bateman	15	15
(England) Marrett & Marrett	5	11

Semi-finals
(England) Sautter & Cundall	15	17
(England) Hawthorn & Peterson	10	4
(England) Chesterton & Lucas	15	15
(England) Thomas & Bateman	5	5

Final
(England) Sautter & Cundall	7	15	15
(England) Chesterton & Lucas	15	9	10

+alias
