= 1909 All England Badminton Championships =

Tournament details
- Dates: 3 March 1909– 6 March 1909
- Edition: 11th
- Venue: London Rifle Brigade Drill Hall
- Location: 130 Bunhill Row, Islington, London
- Official website: All England Championships

The 1909 All England Badminton Championships was a badminton tournament held at the London Rifle Brigade Drill Hall, Islington, London, England, from March 3 to March 6, 1909.

Meriel Lucas won a fifth Championship women's singles title and a ninth women's doubles title to take her total to 15 Championship titles. Frank Chesterton won the men's singles and doubles.

== Final results ==
Category	Winners	Runners-up	Score
Men's singles	(England) Frank Chesterton	(England) Henry Marrett	15-8 8-15 15-10
Women's singles	(England) Meriel Lucas	(England) Lavinia Radeglia	11-3 11-5
Men's doubles	(England) Frank Chesterton & Albert Prebble	(England) Sir George Thomas & Henry Marrett	15-6 3-15 15-7
Women's doubles	(England) Meriel Lucas & G. L. Murray	(England) Alice Gowenlock & Dorothy Cundall	15-3 9-15 15-6
Mixed doubles	(England) Albert Prebble & Dora Boothby	(England) Frank Chesterton & Meriel Lucas	15-9 18-17

== Men's singles ==
There was only one first round match between G. T. Crombie & S. Ziffo in which Crombie received a walkover.

Second round
(England) Frank Chesterton	15	15
(Scotland) H. J. H. Inglis	6	0
(England) A. W. Andrews	15	15
(Scotland) G. T. Crombie	3	3
(England) Guy Sautter	15	15
(England) J. H. Coutts	11	11
(Scotland) James Crombie	15	15
(England) J. D. Orr	9	7
(England) George Thomas	15	15
(Scotland) W. B. Bayne	2	1
(England) Edward Hawthorn	15	15	15
(England) E. Young	18	9	6
(England) J. H. Colin Prior	15	15
(Scotland) Thomas L. Adam	7	8
(England) Henry Marrett	15	15
(England) Maj. H. C. Fanshawe	6	3

Quarterfinals
(England) Chesterton	15	15
(England) Andrews	3	11
(England) Sautter	15	15
(Scotland) Crombie	11	5
(England) Thomas	15	15
(England) Hawthorn	8	9
(England) Prior
(England) Marrett	15	15

Semifinals
(England) Chesterton	15	15
(England) Sautter	10	8
(England) Thomas	8	5
(England) Marrett	15	15

Final
(England) Chesterton	15	8	15
(England) Marrett	8	15	10

== Women's singles ==
The first round consisted of just one match in which Lavinia Radeglia defeated Alice Gowenlock 11-9 13-12

Second round
(England) Meriel Lucas	11	11
(England) Margaret Larminie	1	3
(England) Mary Bateman	9	11	11
(England) G. L. Murray	11	3	5
(England) Lavinia Radeglia	11	11
(England) Dorothy Cundall	6	1
(England) Mabel Smith	11	11
(England) V. A. Lamb	6	5

Semifinals
(England) Lucas	11	11
(England) Bateman	3	2
(England) Radeglia	13	7	11
(England) Smith	10	11	4

Final
(England) Lucas	11	11
(England) Radeglia	3	5

== Men's doubles ==
First round
(England) Frank Chesterton & Albert Prebble	15	15
(Scotland) Thomas L. Adam & G. T. Crombie	9	9
(England) Henry Hetley & R. Kerr	13	17	15
(England) Edward Hawthorn & T. R. Fraser	15	15	7
(England) Frank Abbatt & E. Young
bye
(England) Hugh Comyn & Guy Sautter
bye
(England) George Thomas & Henry Marrett	11	15	15
(Scotland) James Crombie & H. J. H. Inglis	15	1	4
(England) Maj. H. C. Fanshawe & Henri de la Condamine
bye
(England) R. Franck & E. P. Harrison
bye
(England) J. H. Coutts & (Scotland) W. B. Bayne
bye

Quarterfinals
(England) Chesterton & Prebble	15	15
(England) Hetley & Kerr	4	9
(England) Abbatt & Young	5	15	18
(England) Comyn & Sautter	15	9	17
(England) Thomas & Marrett	15	15
(England) Fanshaw & de la Condamine	0	5
(England) Franck & Harrison	15	18
(England) Coutts & (Scotland) Bayne	10	17

Semifinals
(England) Chesterton & Prebble	15	15
(England) Abbatt & Young	3	5
(England) Thomas & Marrett	15	9
(England) Franck & Harrison	15	11

Final
(England) Chesterton & Prebble	15	6	3
(England) Thomas & Marrett	15	15	7

== Women's doubles ==
First round
(England) Meriel Lucas & G. L. Murray	15	15
(England) M. Drake & Florence Lannowe	5	5
(England) Mary Bateman & Hazel Hogarth
bye
(England) Dorothy Cundall & Alice Gowenlock	15	6	15
(England) Mabel Smith & Dora Boothby	12	15	9
(England) Lavinia Radeglia & V. A. Lamb	15	7	15
(England) Margaret Larminie & Hodson	8	15	2

Semifinals
(England) Lucas & Murray	15	17
(England) Bateman & Hogarth	10	15
(England) Gowenlock & Cundall	15	14	18
(England) Lamb & Radeglia	1	17	14

Final
(England) Lucas & Murray	15	9	15
(England) Gowenlock & Cundall	3	15	6

== Mixed doubles ==
The first round consisted of just one match in which Edward Hawthorn & C. K. Petersen defeated W. D. Bayne & Miss Radley 15-7, 15-13.

Second round
(England) Albert Prebble & Dora Boothby	w/o
(England) Maj. H. C. Fanshawe & C. Orr	scr
(England) Hugh Comyn & Muriel Bateman	15	11	15
(England) F. L. Shelton; Margaret Larminie	8	15	4
(England) Guy Sautter & Dorothy Cundall	15	15
(England) Henry Hetley & Mabel Smith	9	4
(England) J. H. Colin Prior & Eveline Peterson	15	3	15
(England) R. Kerr & Florence Lannowe	14	15	6
(England) Frank Chesterton & Meriel Lucas	15	15
(England) E. Young & Alice Gowenlock	12	5
(England) George Thomas & G. L. Murray	18	4	15
(England) Henry Marrett & Hazel Hogarth	17	15	9
(England) Edward Hawthorn & Constance Peterson	15	15
(Scotland) James Crombie & Dorothea Douglass	7	6
(Scotland) G. T. Crombie & (England) V. A. Lamb	w/o
(England) Percy Fitton & Lavinia Radeglia	scr

Quarter-finals
(England) Prebble & Boothby	15	15
(England) Comyn & Bateman	11	12
(England) Sautter & Cundall	15	15
(England) Prior & Peterson	4	9
(England) Chesterton & Lucas	11	15	15
(England) Thomas & Murray	15	11	8
(England) Hawthorn & Petersen	15	15
(Scotland) Crombie & (England) Lamb	7	6

Semi-finals
(England) Prebble & Boothby	15	18
(England) Sautter & Cundall	4	15
(England) Chesterton & Lucas	15	15
(England) Hawthorn & Petersen	6	9

Final
(England) Prebble & Boothby	15	18
(England) Chesterton & Lucas	9	17
