= List of All England women's singles champions =

All England Open Badminton Championships Ladies' Singles Champions
- Location: Birmingham; United Kingdom
- Venue: Utilita Arena Birmingham
- Governing body: NEC Group
- Created: 1900
- Editions: Total: 114; Open era (since 1980): 45
- Prize money: $101,500 (2025)
- Trophy: Perpetual Challenge Bowl
- Website: allenglandbadminton.com

Most titles
- Amateur era: 10: Judy Devlin
- Open era: 4: Susi Susanti

Most consecutive titles
- Amateur era: 5: Judy Devlin
- Open era: 3: Ye Zhaoying; 3: Xie Xingfang

Current champion
- An Se-young – 2025 (2nd title)

The All England Open Badminton Championships is an annual British badminton tournament created in 1899. For four decades beginning 1954, the Championships was held at the Wembley Arena, London but since 1994, it has been played at the Arena Birmingham in the city of Birmingham, United Kingdom. The Ladies' Singles was first contested in 1900. Below is the list of the winners at the All England Open Badminton Championships in ladies' singles. The tournament was cancelled between 1915–1919 because of World War I, and between 1940–1946 because of World War II.

== History ==
In the Amateur era, Judy Devlin (1954, 1957–1958, 1960–1964, 1966–1967) holds the record for the most titles in the Ladies' Singles, winning All England ten times. Devlin also holds the record for most consecutive titles with five from 1960 to 1964.

Since the Open era of badminton began in late 1979 with the inclusion of professional badminton players from around the world in 1980, Susi Susanti (1990–1991, 1993–1994) holds the record for the most Ladies' Singles titles with four. Ye Zhaoying (1997–1999) and Xie Xingfang (2005–2007) share the record for most consecutive victories with three.

This event was won without losing a single game in the entire tournament during the Open Era as many as ten times. The first to accomplish this was Lene Køppen who won the very first Open Era edition in 1980, followed by Zhang Ailing in 1982, consecutively from 1984 to 1986 by Li Lingwei, Han Aiping and Kim Yun-ja respectively, Gu Jiaming in 1988, Zhou Mi in 2003, Xie Xingfang in 2005 and 2007 and Wang Shixian in 2014.

Lene Køppen is the only player in history to reach the All England Open Badminton Ladies' Singles Final in both the Amateur and Open Era. She managed to do so a total of four times, winning in the last and first editions of the Amateur and Open Era respectively and also losing once each in both Era.

== Finalists ==
=== Amateur era ===
Year	Country	Champions	Country	Runners–up	Score
1900	ENG	Ethel Thomson	ENG	E. Moseley	17–15, 15–11
1901	ENG	Ethel Thomson	ENG	Mina Schrieber	15–12, 15–7
1902	ENG	Meriel Lucas	ENG	Ethel Thomson	15–11, 16–18, 15–2
1903	ENG	Ethel Thomson	ENG	Dorothea Douglass	18–15, 15–9
1904	ENG	Ethel Thomson	ENG	Dorothea Douglass	15–2, 15–8
1905	ENG	Meriel Lucas	ENG	Mabel Hardy	9–15, 15–6, 15–9
1906	ENG	Ethel Thomson	ENG	M. E. Brown	Walkover
1907	ENG	Meriel Lucas	ENG	Dorothea Douglass	15–5, 8–15, 15–13
1908	ENG	Meriel Lucas	ENG	G. L. Murray	11–2, 11–3
1909	ENG	Meriel Lucas	ENG	Lavinia Radeglia	11–3, 11–5
1910	ENG	Meriel Lucas	ENG	Margaret Larminie	11–5, 3–11, 11–5
1911	ENG	Margaret Larminie	ENG	Alice Gowenlock	11–9, 4–11, 11–4
1912	ENG	Margaret Tragett (Note: Margaret Tragett formerly known as Margaret Larminie, married 1911)	ENG	Ethel Larcombe (Note: Ethel Larcombe formerly Ethel Thomson, married in 1906)	11–14, 11–2, 14–13
1913	ENG	Lavinia Radeglia	ENG	Margaret Tragett	11–5, 11–8
1914	ENG	Lavinia Radeglia	ENG	Bottomley	11–3, 11–5
1915–1919	No competition				
1920	ENG	Kitty McKane	ENG	Margaret Tragett	11–6, 11–5
1921	ENG	Kitty McKane	ENG	Margaret Tragett	11–5, 11–6
1922	ENG	Kitty McKane	ENG	Margaret Tragett	11–7, 11–7
1923	ENG	Lavinia Radeglia	ENG	Marian Horsley	11–8, 11–6
1924	ENG	Kitty McKane	ENG	Margaret Tragett	11–4, 11–2
1925	ENG	Margaret Stocks	ENG	Marjorie Barrett	11–2, 11–7
1926	ENG	Marjorie Barrett	ENG	Margaret Tragett	11–7, 11–3
1927	ENG	Marjorie Barrett	ENG	Margaret Tragett	11–8, 11–3
1928	ENG	Margaret Tragett	ENG	Nora Coop	11–3, 5–11, 11–5
1929	ENG	Marjorie Barrett	ENG	F. Waterhouse	11–8, 14–13
1930	ENG	Marjorie Barrett	ENG	Betty Uber	11–2, 5–11, 11–9
1931	ENG	Marjorie Barrett	ENG	Leoni Kingsbury	11–8, 4–11, 14–9
1932	ENG	Leoni Kingsbury	ENG	Alice Woodroffe	11–4, 5–11, 11–2
1933	ENG	Alice Woodroffe	ENG	Leoni Kingsbury	
1934	ENG	Leoni Kingsbury	ENG	Thelma Kingsbury	11–4, 11–6
1935	ENG	Betty Uber	ENG	Alice Teague	11–1 11–6
1936	ENG	Thelma Kingsbury	ENG	Betty Uber	5–11, 11–3, 11–2
1937	ENG	Thelma Kingsbury	ENG	Diana Doveton	11–0, 11–0
1938	ENG	Daphne Young	ENG	Betty Uber	10–12, 12–11, 11–3
1939	CAN	Dorothy Walton	ENG	Diana Doveton	11–4, 11–5
1940–1946	No competition				
1947	DEN	Marie Ussing	DEN	Kirsten Thorndahl	11–6, 6–11, 12–10
1948	DEN	Kirsten Thorndahl	DEN	Tonny Ahm	15–3, 15–13
1949	DEN	Aase Schiøtt Jacobsen	DEN	Aase Svendsen	8–11, 11–8, 11–4
1950	DEN	Tonny Ahm	DEN	Aase Schiøtt Jacobsen	11–4, 11–6
1951	DEN	Aase Schiøtt Jacobsen	DEN	Tonny Ahm	11–6, 11–2
1952	DEN	Tonny Ahm	DEN	Aase Schiøtt Jacobsen	11–4, 11–2
1953	DEN	Marie Ussing	DEN	Agnete Friis	11–2, 7–11, 11–2
1954	USA	Judy Devlin	ENG	Iris Cooley	11–7, 11–5
1955	USA	Margaret Varner	USA	Judy Devlin	9–12, 11–5, 11–1
1956	USA	Margaret Varner	USA	Judy Devlin	11–8, 12–5
1957	USA	Judy Devlin	USA	Margaret Varner	11–2, 11–7
1958	USA	Judy Devlin	USA	Margaret Varner	11–7, 12–10
1959	ENG	Heather Ward	USA	Judy Devlin	11–7, 3–11, 11–4
1960	USA	Judy Devlin	USA	Margaret Varner	11–1, 11–9
1961	USA	Judy Hashman (Note: Judy Hashman formerly Judy Devlin, married in 1960)	ENG	Ursula Smith	11–2, 11–6
1962	USA	Judy Hashman	ENG	Ursula Smith	11–4, 11–0
1963	USA	Judy Hashman	ENG	Angela Bairstow	11–5, 11–9
1964	USA	Judy Hashman	ENG	Ursula Smith	11–0, 11–3
1965	ENG	Ursula Smith	DEN	Ulla Strand	11–7, 11–7
1966	USA	Judy Hashman	NED	Imre Rietveld	11–6, 11–7
1967	USA	Judy Hashman	JPN	Noriko Takagi	5–11, 11–8, 12–10
1968	SWE	Eva Twedberg	INA	Minarni	11–6, 11–2
1969	JPN	Hiroe Yuki	JPN	Noriko Takagi	11–5, 11–5
1970	JPN	Etsuko Takenaka	ENG	Heather Nielsen (Note: Heather Nielsen formerly Heather Ward)	11–3, 11–4
1971	SWE	Eva Twedberg	DEN	Anni Berglund	11–3, 6–11, 11–2
1972	JPN	Noriko Nakayama	JPN	Hiroe Yuki	11–5, 3–11, 11–7
1973	ENG	Margaret Beck	ENG	Gillian Gilks	11–8, 11–0
1974	JPN	Hiroe Yuki	ENG	Gillian Gilks	11–5, 11–9
1975	JPN	Hiroe Yuki	ENG	Gillian Gilks	11–5, 11–9
1976	ENG	Gillian Gilks	ENG	Margaret Lockwood (Note: Margaret Lockwood formerly Margaret Beck, married in 1975)	11–0, 11–3
1977	JPN	Hiroe Yuki	DEN	Lene Køppen	7–11, 11–3, 11–7
1978	ENG	Gillian Gilks	JPN	Saori Kondo	11–1, 11–9
1979	DEN	Lene Køppen	JPN	Saori Kondo	13–9, 1–11, 11–8

=== Open era ===
Year	Country	Champions	Country	Runners–up	Score
1980	DEN	Lene Køppen	INA	Verawaty Fajrin	11–2, 11–6
1981	KOR	Sun-ae Hwang	DEN	Lene Køppen	11–1, 11–2
1982	CHN	Ailing Zhang	CHN	Lingwei Li	11–4, 11–6
1983	CHN	Ailing Zhang	CHN	Jianqiu Wu	11–5, 10–12, 12–9
1984	CHN	Lingwei Li	CHN	Aiping Han	11–5, 11–8
1985	CHN	Aiping Han	CHN	Lingwei Li	11–7, 12–10
1986	KOR	Yun-ja Kim	CHN	Ping Qian	11–6, 12–11
1987	DEN	Kirsten Larsen	CHN	Ping Qian	9–7 (retired)
1988	CHN	Jiaming Gu	KOR	Young-suk Lee	11–2, 11–2
1989	CHN	Lingwei Li	INA	Susi Susanti	11–8, 11–4
1990	INA	Susi Susanti	CHN	Hua Huang	12–11, 11–1
1991	INA	Susi Susanti	INA	Sarwendah Kusumawardhani	0–11, 11–2, 11–6
1992	CHN	Jiuhong Tang	KOR	Soo-hyun Bang	9–12, 12–10, 11–1
1993	INA	Susi Susanti	KOR	Soo-hyun Bang	4–11, 11–4, 11–1
1994	INA	Susi Susanti	CHN	Zhaoying Ye	11–5, 11–9
1995	SWE	Xiaoqing Lim	DEN	Camilla Martin	11–9, 10–12, 11–3
1996	KOR	Soo-hyun Bang	CHN	Zhaoying Ye	11–1, 11–1
1997	CHN	Zhaoying Ye	CHN	Zhichao Gong	11–3, 11–1
1998	CHN	Zhaoying Ye	CHN	Ning Zhang	11–5, 11–8
1999	CHN	Zhaoying Ye	CHN	Yun Dai	9–11, 11–5, 11–1
2000	CHN	Zhichao Gong	CHN	Yun Dai	11–5, 8–11, 11–5
2001	CHN	Zhichao Gong	CHN	Mi Zhou	11–7, 11–3
2002	DEN	Camilla Martin	CHN	Ruina Gong	7–5, 8–6, 7–3
2003	CHN	Mi Zhou	CHN	Xingfang Xie	11–6, 11–5
2004	CHN	Ruina Gong	CHN	Mi Zhou	11–7, 11–7
2005	CHN	Xingfang Xie	CHN	Ning Zhang	11–3, 11–9
2006	CHN	Xingfang Xie	CHN	Ning Zhang	11–3, 9–11, 11–3
2007	CHN	Xingfang Xie	FRA	Hongyan Pi	21–6, 21–13
2008	DEN	Tine Rasmussen	CHN	Lan Lu	21–11, 18–21, 22–20
2009	CHN	Yihan Wang	DEN	Tine Rasmussen	21–19, 21–23, 21–11
2010	DEN	Tine Rasmussen	CHN	Yihan Wang	21–14, 18–21, 21–19
2011	CHN	Shixian Wang	JPN	Eriko Hirose	24–22, 21–18
2012	CHN	Xuerui Li	CHN	Yihan Wang	21–13, 21–19
2013	DEN	Tine Baun (Note: Tine Baun formerly Tine Rasmussen, married in 2010)	THA	Ratchanok Intanon	21–14, 16–21, 21–10
2014	CHN	Shixian Wang	CHN	Xuerui Li	21–19, 21–18
2015	ESP	Carolina Marín	IND	Saina Nehwal	16–21, 21–14, 21–7
2016	JPN	Nozomi Okuhara	CHN	Shixian Wang	21–11, 16–21, 21–19
2017	TPE	Tzu-ying Tai	THA	Ratchanok Intanon	21–16, 22–20
2018	TPE	Tzu-ying Tai	JPN	Akane Yamaguchi	22–20, 21–13
2019	CHN	Yufei Chen	TPE	Tzu-ying Tai	21–17, 21–17
2020	TPE	Tzu-ying Tai	CHN	Yufei Chen	21–19, 21–15
2021	JPN	Nozomi Okuhara	THA	Pornpawee Chochuwong	21–12, 21–16
2022	JPN	Akane Yamaguchi	KOR	Se-young An	21–15, 21–15
2023	KOR	Se-young An	CHN	Yufei Chen	21–17, 10–21, 21–19
2024	ESP	Carolina Marín	JPN	Akane Yamaguchi	26–24, 11–1 (retired)
2025	KOR	Se-young An	CHN	Zhiyi Wang	13–21, 21–18, 21–18
2026	CHN	Zhiyi Wang	KOR	Se-young An	21–15, 21–19

== Statistics ==
=== Multiple titles ===
Bold indicates active players.

Rank	Country	Player	Amateur era	Open era	All-time	Years
1	USA	Judy Devlin	10	0	10	1954, 1957, 1958, 1960, 1961, 1962, 1963, 1964, 1966, 1967
2	ENG	Meriel Lucas	6	0	6	1902, 1905, 1907, 1908, 1909, 1910
3	ENG	Ethel Warneford Thomson	5	0	5	1900, 1901, 1903, 1904, 1906
3	ENG	Marjorie Barrett	5	0	5	1926, 1927, 1929, 1930, 1931
5	ENG	Kitty McKane	4	0	4	1920, 1921, 1922, 1924
5	JPN	Hiroe Yuki	4	0	4	1969, 1974, 1975, 1977
5	INA	Susi Susanti	0	4	4	1990, 1991, 1993, 1994
8	ENG	Margaret Larminie	3	0	3	1911, 1912, 1928
8	ENG	Lavinia Clara Radeglia	3	0	3	1913, 1914, 1923
8	CHN	Zhaoying Ye	0	3	3	1997, 1998, 1999
8	CHN	Xingfang Xie	0	3	3	2005, 2006, 2007
8	DEN	Tine Rasmussen	0	3	3	2008, 2010, 2013
8	TPE	**Tzu-ying Tai**	0	3	3	2017, 2018, 2020
14	ENG	Leoni Kingsbury	2	0	2	1932, 1934
14	ENG	Thelma Kingsbury	2	0	2	1936, 1937
14	DEN	Marie Ussing	2	0	2	1947, 1953
14	DEN	Aase Schiøtt Jacobsen	2	0	2	1949, 1951
14	DEN	Tonny Ahm	2	0	2	1950, 1952
14	USA	Margaret Varner	2	0	2	1955, 1956
14	SWE	Eva Twedberg	2	0	2	1968, 1971
14	ENG	Gillian Gilks	2	0	2	1976, 1978
14	DEN	Lene Køppen	1	1	2	1979, 1980
14	CHN	Ailing Zhang	0	2	2	1982, 1983
14	CHN	Lingwei Li	0	2	2	1984, 1989
14	CHN	Zhichao Gong	0	2	2	2000, 2001
14	CHN	Shixian Wang	0	2	2	2011, 2014
14	JPN	**Nozomi Okuhara**	0	2	2	2016, 2021
14	ESP	**Carolina Marín**	0	2	2	2015, 2024
14	KOR	**Se-young An**	0	2	2	2023, 2025

=== Champions by country ===
Rank	Country	Amateur era	Open era	All-time	First title	Last title	First champion	Last champion
1	England (ENG)	39	0	39	1900	1978	Ethel Warneford Thomson	Gillian Gilks
2	China (CHN)	0	23	23	1982	2026	Ailing Zhang	Zhiyi Wang
3	Denmark (DEN)	8	6	14	1947	2013	Marie Ussing	Tine Rasmussen
4	United States (USA)	12	0	12	1954	1967	Judy Devlin	
5	Japan (JPN)	6	3	9	1969	2022	Hiroe Yuki	Akane Yamaguchi
6	South Korea (KOR)	0	5	5	1981	2025	Sun-ae Hwang	Se-young An
7	Indonesia (INA)	0	4	4	1990	1994	Susi Susanti	
8	Chinese Taipei (TPE)	0	3	3	2017	2020	Tzu-ying Tai	
8	Sweden (SWE)	2	1	3	1968	1995	Eva Twedberg	Xiaoqing Lim
10	Spain (ESP)	0	2	2	2015	2024	Carolina Marín	
11	Canada (CAN)	1	0	1	1939		Dorothy Walton	

=== Multiple finalists ===
Bold indicates active players.
Italic indicates players who never won the championship.

Rank	Country	Player	Amateur era	Open era	All-time
1	USA	Judy Devlin	13	0	13
2	ENG	Margaret Larminie	11	0	11
3	ENG	Ethel Warneford Thomson	7	0	7
4	ENG	Meriel Lucas	6	0	6
4	ENG	Marjorie Barrett	6	0	6
6	JPN	Hiroe Yuki	5	0	5
6	ENG	Gillian Gilks	5	0	5
6	INA	Susi Susanti	0	5	5
6	CHN	Zhaoying Ye	0	5	5
10	ENG	Lavinia Clara Radeglia	4	0	4
10	ENG	Kitty McKane	4	0	4
10	ENG	Leoni Kingsbury	4	0	4
10	ENG	Betty Uber	4	0	4
10	DEN	Aase Schiøtt Jacobsen	4	0	4
10	DEN	Tonny Ahm	4	0	4
10	ENG	Ursula Smith	4	0	4
10	DEN	Lene Køppen	2	2	4
10	CHN	Lingwei Li	0	4	4
10	CHN	Xingfang Xie	0	4	4
10	TPE	**Tzu-ying Tai**	0	4	4
10	DEN	Tine Rasmussen	0	4	4
22	ENG	Dorothea Katharina Douglass	3	0	3
22	ENG	Alice Woodroffe	3	0	3
22	ENG	Thelma Kingsbury	3	0	3
22	JPN	Noriko Nakayama	3	0	3
22	KOR	Soo-hyun Bang	0	3	3
22	CHN	Zhichao Gong	0	3	3
22	CHN	Ning Zhang	0	3	3
22	CHN	Mi Zhou	0	3	3
22	CHN	Yihan Wang	0	3	3
22	CHN	Shixian Wang	0	3	3
22	CHN	**Yufei Chen**	0	3	3
22	JPN	**Akane Yamaguchi**	0	3	3
22	KOR	**Se-young An**	0	3	3
35	ENG	Diana Doveton	2	0	2
35	DEN	Marie Ussing	2	0	2
35	DEN	Kirsten Thorndahl	2	0	2
35	SWE	Eva Twedberg	2	0	2
35	ENG	Margaret Beck	2	0	2
35	JPN	Saori Kondo	2	0	2
35	CHN	Ailing Zhang	0	2	2
35	CHN	Aiping Han	0	2	2
35	CHN	Ping Qian	0	2	2
35	DEN	Camilla Martin	0	2	2
35	CHN	Yun Dai	0	2	2
35	CHN	Ruina Gong	0	2	2
35	CHN	Xuerui Li	0	2	2
35	THA	**Ratchanok Intanon**	0	2	2
35	JPN	**Nozomi Okuhara**	0	2	2
35	ESP	**Carolina Marín**	0	2	2

== See also ==
- List of All England men's singles champions
- List of All England men's doubles champions
- List of All England women's doubles champions
- List of All England mixed doubles champions
