= 1907 All England Badminton Championships =

Badminton tournament in Islington, London

Tournament details
- Dates: 27 February 1907– 2 March 1907
- Edition: 9th
- Venue: London Rifle Brigade Drill Hall
- Location: 130 Bunhill Row, Islington, London
- Official website: All England Championships

The 1907 All England Open Badminton Championships was a badminton tournament held at the London Rifle Brigade Drill Hall, Islington, London, England, from February 27 to March 2, 1907.

Norman Wood retained his singles title.

== Final results ==
Category	Winners	Runners-up	Score
Men's singles	(England) Norman Wood	(England) Frank Chesterton	15-6, 15-7
Women's singles	(England) Meriel Lucas	(England) Dorothea Douglass	15-5, 8-15, 15-13
Men's doubles	(England) Albert Prebble & Norman Wood	(England) Frank Chesterton & Stewart Massey	17-16, 15-3
Women's doubles	(England) Meriel Lucas & G L Murray	(England) Alice Gowenlock & Dorothy Cundall	15-9, 15-9
Mixed doubles	(England) Sir George Thomas & G L Murray	(England) Albert Prebble & Dora Boothby	18-17, 15-1
Men's doubles handicap	(England) E. Young & R. Young (owe 3)	(England) Henry Hetley & R. D. Marshal (owe 6)	2-15, 15-12, 15-11
Women's doubles handicap	(England) Margaret Larminie & Meriel Lucas (owe 8)	(England) E. C. Davenport & G. L. Murray (owe 3)	15-4, 15-4
Mixed doubles handicap (class A)	(England) Norman Wood & E. C. Davenport (owe 10)	(England) G. L. Chamberlin & H. Harper (owe 4)	15-9, 7-15, 15-13
Mixed doubles handicap (class B)	(England) R. Young & C. Evans (scratch)	(England) Bertram Bisgood & Wheelwright (owe 2)	15-11, 15-14
Veterans' doubles handicap	(England) George Vidal & C. A. Turner (owe 7)	(England) Col. G. W. Deane & C. G. Eames (owe 3)	15-7, 15-5

== Men's singles ==
First round
(England) Norman Wood	15	15
(England) Ralph Watling	3	3
(England) Henry Marrett
bye
(England) Guy Sautter
bye
(England) Hugh Comyn	15	15
(England) H. N. Wright	2	8
(England) Frank Chesterton	15	15
(England) E. P. Harrison	10	10
(Republic of Ireland) Henry Cave
bye
(England) George Thomas	15	15
(Republic of Ireland) Arthur Cave	4	10
(England) Edward Hawthorn	11	15	15
(England) T. H. E. Bird	15	8	5

Quarter-finals
(England) Wood	7	15	15
(England) Marrett	15	5	5
(England) Sautter	15	8	15
(England) Comyn	8	15	12
(England) Chesterton	15	12	15
(Republic of Ireland) Cave	13	15	8
(England) Thomas	15	15
(England) Hawthorn	8	4

Semi-finals
(England) Wood	15	15	15
(England) Sautter	17	6	3
(England) Chesterton	17	15
(England) Thomas	16	9

Final
(England) Wood	15	15
(England) Chesterton	6	7

== Women's singles ==
First round
(England) Meriel Lucas
bye
(England) Mabel Smith	15	15
(England) Hazel Hogarth	11	4
(England) Margaret Larminie
bye
(England) Muriel Bateman
bye
(England) Dorothea Douglass
bye
(England) Dorothy Cundall
bye
(England) Miss G. L. Murray	15	14	15
(England) Alice Gowenlock	3	18	7
(England) Miss F. Hunter
bye

Quarter-finals
(England) Lucas	15	w/o
(England) Smith	8	ret
(England) Larminie	15	8	15
(England) Bateman	3	15	12
(England) Douglass	15	15
(England) Cundall	9	10
(England) Murray	15	15
(England) Hunter	2	3

Semi-finals
(England) Lucas	17	15
(England) Larminie	14	8
(England) Douglass	18	15
(England) Murray	14	3

Final
(England) Lucas	15	8	15
(England) Douglass	5	15	13

== Men's doubles ==
First round
(England) Albert Prebble & Norman Wood	15	15
(England) E. Young & R. Young	4	7
(England) T. R Fraser & Edward Hawthorn	15	15
(England) J. C. Llewellyn & Ralph Watling	9	6
(England) Henry Marrett & George Thomas
bye
no tie
no tie
(England) Frank Chesterton & Stewart Massey	15	15
(England) Hugh Comyn & E. P. Harrison	9	8
no tie
no tie
(Republic of Ireland) Arthur Cave & Henry Cave
bye
(England) Henry Hetley & R. D. Marshal
bye

Quarter-finals
(England) Prebble & Wood	15	15
(England) Fraser & Hawthorn	4	4
(England) Marrett & Thomas
bye
(England) Chesterton & Massey
bye
(Republic of Ireland) Cave & Cave	15	15
(England) Hetley & Marshal	9	8

Semi-finals
(England) Prebble & Wood	15	14	15
(England) Marrett & Thomas	10	17	5
(England) Chesterton & Massey	15	18
(Republic of Ireland) Cave & Cave	5	17

Final
(England) Prebble & Wood	17	15
(England) Chesterton & Massey	16	3

== Women's doubles ==
First round
(England) Meriel Lucas & Miss G. L. Murray	15	15
(England) Isabella Harbottle & Miss H. Harper	2	6
(England) Muriel Bateman & Hazel Hogarth	15	15
(Scotland) Mrs R. Gill & Miss P.Mackenzie	1	1
(England) Dorothy Cundall & Alice Gowenlock	15	15
(England) Mabel Smith & Dora Boothby	10	8
(England) Dorothea Douglass & Margaret Larminie	15	15
(England) Mrs Binyon & Florence Lannowe	4	9

Semi-finals
(England) Lucas & Murray	15	4	15
(England) Bateman & Hogarth	5	15	8
(England) Cundall & Gowenlock	15	16	15
(England) Douglass & Larminie	10	17	6

Final
(England) Lucas & Murray	15	15
(England) Gowenlock & Cundall	9	9

== Mixed doubles ==
First round
(England) George Thomas & Miss G. L. Murray
(England) Frank Chesterton & Dorothea Douglass
(England) Norman Wood & Meriel Lucas	15	15
(England) Henry Marrett & Hazel Hogarth	1	8
(England) Ralph Watling & Mabel Smith	15	15
(England) E. P. Harrison & Florence Lannowe	10	10
(England) E. Young & Alice Gowenlock
bye
(England) Albert Prebble & Dora Boothby
bye
(Republic of Ireland) Arthur Cave & (England) Margaret Larminie	15	8	15
(England) Hugh Comyn & Dorothy Cundall	11	15	2
(England) Stewart Massey & Muriel Bateman	15	15
(England) Guy Sautter & Isabella Harbottle	5	3
(England) Edward Hawthorn & Lavinia Radeglia
bye

Quarter-finals
(England) Thomas & Murray	15	15
(England) Wood & Lucas	5	8
(England) Watling & Smith	17	5	15
(England) Young & Gowenlock	14	15	10
(England) Prebble & Boothby	18	15
(Republic of Ireland) Cave & (England) Larminie	17	11
(England) Massey & Bateman	15	15
(England) Hawthorn & Radeglia	6	7

Semi-finals
(England) Thomas & Murray	15	15
(England) Watling & Smith	0	8
(England) Prebble & Boothby	15	1	15
(England) Massey & Bateman	8	15	11

Final
(England) Thomas & Murray	18	15
(England) Prebble & Boothby	17	1
