= 1906 All England Badminton Championships =

Tournament details
- Dates: 28 February 1906– 3 March 1906
- Edition: 8th
- Venue: London Rifle Brigade Drill Hall
- Location: 130 Bunhill Row, Islington, London
- Official website: All England Championships

The 1906 All England Championships was a badminton tournament held at the London Rifle Brigade Drill Hall, London, England, from February 28 to March 3, 1906.

Ethel Thomson and Meriel Lucas won a fourth women's doubles crown and third consecutive after retaining their title. There were two mixed doubles handicap events due to the excessive number of entries.

== Final results ==
Category	Winners	Runners-up	Score
Men's singles	(England) Norman Wood	(England) Frank Chesterton	15–8, 18-13
Women's singles	(England) Ethel Thompson	(England) M. E. Brown	walkover
Men's doubles	(England) Sir George Thomas & Henry Marrett	(England) Albert Prebble & Norman Wood	15–5, 5–15, 15-11
Women's doubles	(England) Meriel Lucas & Ethel Thomson	(England) Muriel Bateman & Hazel Hogarth	15-10, 15-5
Mixed doubles	(England) Sir George Thomas & Ethel Thomson	(England) Norman Wood & G. L. Murray	17-16, 15-3
Men's doubles handicap	(England) G. L. Chamberlin & C. J. Greenwood (+6)	(England) E. Young & R. Young (-5)	15–8, 15-12
Women's doubles Handicap	(England) Muriel Bateman & Hazel Hogarth (-10)	(England) Ethel Thomson & M. E. Brown (-12)	15-1, 15-1
Mixed doubles handicap (class A)	(England) Norman Wood & Hazel Hogarth (10)	(England) Henry Marrett & N. Stevens (Scr)	15-9, 15-12
Mixed doubles handicap (class B)	(England) L. W. Jameson & Morris (6)	(England) E. A. Short & Dorothea Douglass (5)	14-15, 15–1, 15-1
Veterans' doubles	(England) George Vidal & C. A. Turner	(England) Albert Cowley & Richard Abbatt	15-4. 15-6

== Men's singles ==
First round
(England) Norman Wood	7	15	15
(England) Henry Marrett	15	2	10
(England) Hugh Comyn	15	15
(England) G. S. Wheatley	1	7
(England) George Thomas	15	15
(England) T. H. E. Bird	5	7
(Republic of Ireland) Arthur Cave	17	15
(England) H. S. Venables	1	3
(England) Frank Chesterton	15	15
(Republic of Ireland) Henry Cave	9	5
(England) Ralph Watling	17	15
(Republic of Ireland) William Cave	15	13
(Scotland) H. J. H. Inglis	15	9	15
(England) E. P. Gilman	9	15	6
(England) E. P. Harrison	15	14	15
(Republic of Ireland) R. D. Orr	11	17	7

Quarter-finals
(England) Wood	15	11	15
(England) Comyn	4	4	5
(England) Thomas	7	15	15
(Republic of Ireland) Cave	15	13	12
(England) Chesterton	12	15	15
(England) Watling	15	4	11
(Scotland) Inglis	15	13	15
(England) Harrison	5	8

Semi-finals
(England) Wood	7	15	17
(England) Thomas	15	8	14
(England) Chesterton	15	15
(Scotland) Inglis	6	7

Final
(England) Wood	15	18
(England) Chesterton	8	13

== Women's singles ==
First round			Semi-finals			Final
(England) Ethel Thomson	15	15
(England) Meriel Lucas	4	6	(England) Thomson	15	15
(England) Dorothea Douglass	15	15	(England) Douglass	2	4
(England) Dorothy Cundall	2	3				(England) Thomson	w/o
(England) Miss M. E. Brown	w/o					(England) Brown	scr
(England) Ellen Stawell-Brown	ret		(England) Brown	15	15
(England) Muriel Bateman	15	15	(England) Bateman	4	10
(England) Miss G. L. Murray	13	6

== Men's doubles ==
First round
(England) Henry Marrett & George Thomas	w/o
(England) C. J. Wiltshire & partner	ret
(England) Stewart Massey & C. T. J. Barnes	15	15
(England) G. W. Harrison & E. P. Gilman	4	10
(England) Frank Chesterton & Frank Abbatt	15	15
(England) T. H. E. Bird & J Sillen	4	7
(England) P. Boyd & Edward Hawthorn	17	15
(England) H. S. Venables & Leonard Ransford	15	4
(England) Albert Prebble & Norman Wood	15	15
(England) E. P. Harrison & Hugh Comyn	9	12
(England) T. R. Fletcher & F. P. Pilkington
bye
(Republic of Ireland) Arthur Cave & Henry Cave	15	17
(England) Ralph Watling & (Scotland) H. J. H. Inglis	6	15
(Republic of Ireland) R. D. Orr & William Cave	w/o
(England) Percy Buckley & G. S. Wheatley	ret

Quarter-finals
(England) Marrett & Thomas	15	11	15
(England) Massey & Barnes	12	15	5
(England) Chesterton & Abbatt	15	15
(England) Boyd & Hawthorn	3	8
(England) Prebble & Wood	15	18
(England) Fletcher & Pilkington	11	9
(Republic of Ireland) Cave & Cave	15	13	15
(Republic of Ireland) Orr & Cave	2	1

Semi-finals
(England) Marrett & Thomas	17	15
(England) Chesterton & Abbatt	14	8
(England) Prebble & Wood	15	16	15
(Republic of Ireland) Cave & Cave	6	17	5

Final
(England) Marrett & Thomas	15	5	15
(England) Prebble & Wood	5	15	11

== Women's doubles ==
First round
(England) Meriel Lucas & Ethel Thomson	15	15
(England) Dorothea Douglass & M. E. Brown	4	6
(England) W. Hunt & M. C. Nicholl
bye
(England) Binyon & Margaret Larminie
bye
(England) A. N. Other & S. Body
bye
(England) Muriel Bateman & Hazel Hogarth
(England) Dora Boothby & Ellen Stawell-Brown
bye
(England) Dorothy Cundall & Alice Gowenlock
bye
(England) E. C. Davenport & Florence Lannowe	w/o
(England) S. A. Graham & Stone	scr

Quarter-finals
(England) Thomson & Lucas	15	15
(England) Hunt & Nicholl	2	4
(England) Binyon & Larminie	w/o
(England) A.N. Other & Body	ret
(England) Bateman & Hogarth	15	12	15
(England) Boothby & Stawell-Brown	13	15	2
(England) Cundall & Gowenlock	15	15
(England) Davenport & Lannowe	10	11

Semi-finals
(England) Thomson & Lucas	15	15
(England) Binyon & Larminie	3	7
(England) Bateman & Hogarth	15	18
(England) Cundall & Gowenlock	1	17

Final
(England) Thomson & Lucas	15	15
(England) Bateman & Hogarth	10	5

== Mixed doubles ==
First round
(England) Sir George Thomas & Ethel Thomson
bye
(England) Frank Chesterton & Margaret Larminie
bye
(England) Albert Prebble & Dora Boothby
bye
(England) Ralph Watling & M. Drake	11	15	15
(Republic of Ireland) R. D. Orr & (England) M. E. Brown	15	8	11
(England) Henry Marrett & Hazel Hogarth
bye
(England) A. N. Other & Bickford
bye
(England) Hugh Comyn & Alice Gowenlock
bye
(England) G. S. Wheatley & M. F. Blakiston
bye
(England) Norman Wood & G. L. Murray
bye
(Republic of Ireland) Arthur Cave & (England) Dorothea Douglass	w/o
(England) T. H. E. Bird & A. N. Other	scr
(England) E. Young & Dorothy Cundall
bye
(England) Franck & (Republic of Ireland) Royse
bye
(England) Stewart Massey & Meriel Lucas
bye
(England) E. P. Gilman & S. A. Graham
bye
(England) Leonard Ransford & Muriel Bateman
bye
(England) E. P. Harrison & Florence Lannowe
bye

Second round
(England) Thomas & Thomson	15	15
(England) Chesterton & Larminie	11	13
(England) Prebble & Boothby	15	15
(England) Watling & Drake	9	13
(England) Marrett & Hogarth	w/o
(England) A.N.Other & Bickford	scr
(England) Comyn & Gowenlock	15	15
(England) Wheatley & Blakiston	1	0
(England) Wood & Murray	15	15
(Republic of Ireland) Cave & (England) Douglass	10	4
(England) Young & Cundall	w/o
(England) Franck & (Republic of Ireland) Royse	ret
(England) Massey & Lucas	15	15
(England) Gilman & Graham	0	0
(England) Ransford & Bateman	15	15	15
(England) Harrison & Lannowe	7	11

Quarter-finals
(England) Thomas & Thomson	12	15	15
(England) Prebble & Boothby	15	6	10
(England) Marrett & Hogarth	15	15
(England) Comyn & Gowenlock	4	11
(England) Wood & Murray	15	15
(England) Young & Cundall	6	2
(England) Massey & Lucas	15	15
(England) Ransford & Bateman	2	12

Semi-finals
(England) Thomas & Thomson	10	15	15
(England) Marrett & Hogarth	15	12	6
(England) Wood & Murray	10	15	15
(England) Massey & Lucas	15	12	9

Final
(England) Thomas & Thomson	17	15
(England) Wood & Murray	16	3
