= 1913 All England Badminton Championships =

Tournament details
- Dates: 27 February 1913– 2 March 1913
- Edition: 15th
- Venue: Royal Horticultural Hall
- Location: Elverton Street, Westminster, London
- Official website: All England Championships

The 1913 All England Open Badminton Championships was a badminton tournament held at the Royal Horticultural Hall, Westminster, England from 27 February to 2 March 1913.

Former champion Guy Sautter competed in the 1913 tournament under the alias of U. N. Lappin and went on to win his second men's singles title. Lavinia Radeglia won the women's singles defeating defending champion Margaret Tragett in the final. Alice Gowenlock was unable to defend her doubles title after pulling out with an ankle injury.

== Final results ==
Category	Winners	Runners-up	Score
Men's singles	(England) U. N. Lappin (Guy Sautter)	(England) Frank Chesterton	15–7, 15–8
Women's singles	(England) Lavinia Radeglia	(England) Margaret Tragett	11–5, 11-8
Men's doubles	(England) Frank Chesterton & Sir George Thomas	(Scotland) Dr. James Crombie & H. J. H. Inglis	15–10, 15–8
Women's doubles	(England) Hazel Hogarth & Muriel Bateman	(England) Marjory East & (Republic of Ireland) C. Johnstone	18–15, 15–4
Mixed doubles	(England) U. N. Lappin (Guy Sautter) & (England) M. E. Mayston	(England) Edward Hawthorn & Hazel Hogarth	15-13, 15-6

== Men's singles ==
In the first round Prior beat Plews 15-8, 18-15 and Chesterton beat Middlemass 15-6 15-0.

Second round
(England) U. N. Lappin (Guy Sautter)	15	15
(England) J. H. Colin Prior	6	2
(England) Edward Hawthorn	15	15
(Scotland) C. J. Davidson	6	2
(England) George Thomas	15	15
(England) Lieut. G. M. Hill	3	7
(England) A. W Andrews	w/o
(England) H. A. Gardiner	scr
(England) Frank Chesterton	15	15
(England) A. K. Jones	3	2
(England) Henry Marrett	15	15
(England) Stephen Woodbridge	4	3
(Scotland) Dr. James Crombie	15	w/o
(Scotland) H. J. H. Inglis	12	ret
(England) R. M. McCallum	15	11
(England) T. R. Hampson	15	3

Quarterfinals
(England) Sautter	15	15
(England) Hawthorn	2	3
(England) Thomas	15	15
(England) Andrews	2	8
(England) Chesterton	15	15
(England) Marrett	10	6
(Scotland) Crombie	15	15
(England) McCallum	1	11

Semifinals
(England) Sautter	15	15
(England) Thomas	10	7
(England) Chesterton	15	15
(Scotland) Crombie	5	11

Final
(England) Sautter	15	15
(England) Chesterton	7	8

== Women's singles ==
First round
(England) Lavinia Radeglia
bye
(England) Francis Bruere
bye
(England) Marjory East
bye
(England) Kathleen Macaldin	11	11
(Republic of Ireland) Louisa Plews (née Kennedy)	0	4
(England) Margaret Tragett
bye
(England) Mrs Bottomley
bye
(England) Lydia Swete
bye
(England) Alice Gowenlock
bye

Quarterfinals
(England) Radeglia	11	11
(England) Bruere	1	7
(England) East	13	11
(England) Macaldin	10	2
(England) Tragett	w/o
(England) Bottomley	scr
(England) Swete	w/o
(England) Gowenlock	scr

Semifinals
(England) Radeglia	11	14
(England) East	8	9
(England) Tragett	11	11
(England) Swete	3	4

Final
(England) Radeglia	11	11
(England) Tragett	5	8

== Men's doubles ==
First round
(England) Frank Chesterton & George Thomas	15	15
(England) Lieut. G. M. Hill & C. H. Middlemass	2	8
(Republic of Ireland) Robert Plews & (England) William Swinden
(England) U. N. Lappin (Guy Sautter) & Edward Hawthorn	15	15
(England) G. E. Mills & Neville Knox	3	7
(England) Robert Prust & T. J. B. Daniell
(Scotland) Dr. James Crombie & H. J. H. Inglis
(England) E. R. Hampson & H. O. Gardner
(England) F. P. Pilkington & F. Bache+	15	15
(England) Hugh Comyn & (Republic of Ireland) Bert Bisgood	7	5
(England) Henry Marrett & J. H. Colin Prior	15	15
(England) R. Franck & C Marriott	6	8

Quarterfinals
(England) Chesterton & Thomas	15	15
(Republic of Ireland) Plews & (England) Swinden	7	6
(England) Sautter & Hawthorn	15	15
(England) Prust & Daniell	6	5
(Scotland) Crombie & Inglis	5	15	15
(England) Hampson & Gardner	15	4	8
(England) Pilkington & Bache+	11	15	15
(England) Prior & Marrett	15	8	12

Semifinals
(England) Chesterton & Thomas	18	15
(England) Sautter & Hawthorn	13	10
(Scotland) Crombie & Inglis	11	15	15
(England) Pilkington & Bache+	15	12	7

Final
(England) Chesterton & Thomas	15	15
(Scotland) Crombie & Inglis	10	8

+ alias

== Women's doubles ==
First round
(England) Hazel Hogarth & Muriel Bateman	15	15
(England) Eveline Peterson & Florence Marrett	6	5
(England) Mayston & Macfarlane
(England) Christina Douglass & Miss Howard
(England) Marjory East & (Republic of Ireland) Miss C. Johnstone
(Republic of Ireland) Louisa Plews (née Kennedy) & (England) Francis Bruere
(England) Margaret Tragett & Lavinia Radeglia	15	15
(England) Mrs Bartlett & Mrs Bottomley	4	12
(England) Kathleen Macaldin & Miss M Denison	15	15
(England) Lydia Swete & Miss J. Bretherton	1	0

Quarterfinals
(England) Hogarth & Bateman	15	15
(England) Mayston & Macfarlane	10	8
(England) Douglass & Howard
(England)
(England) East & (Republic of Ireland) Johnstone	15	15
(Republic of Ireland) Plews & (England) Bruere	7	7
(England) Tragett & Radeglia
(England) Swete & Bretherton

Semifinals
(England) Hogarth & Bateman	15	15
(England) Douglass & Howard	10	9
(England) East & (Republic of Ireland) Johnstone	15	15
(England) Tragett & Radeglia	11	9

Final
(England) Hogarth & Bateman	18	15
(England) East & (Republic of Ireland) Johnstone	15	4

== Mixed doubles ==
First round
(England) Guy Sautter & M. E. Mayston	15	15
(England) George Thomas & Lavinia Radeglia	5	8
(England) Frank Chesterton & Margaret Tragett	15	15
(Scotland) C. J. Davidson & (England) Miss D. Bramwell	6	5
(England) J. H. Colin Prior & Eveline Peterson
(Republic of Ireland) Robert Plews & Louisa Plews (née Kennedy)	15	2	17
(England) A. L. Bentley & Mrs A. Harvey	7	15	16
(England) Edward Hawthorn & Hazel Hogarth	15	15
(England) T. R. Hampson & Marjory East	5	3
(England) William Swinden & Christina Douglass	15	15
(England) Lieut. G. M. Hill & Miss Conran	9	11
(England) Henry Marrett & Florence Marrett	18	15
(England) E. B. Milner & Miss R. Mackenzie	13	6
(England) F. Bache+ & Miss D. Harvey	15	17
(England) H. A. Gardner & Muriel Bateman	5	14

Quarterfinals
(England) Sautter & Mayston	17	15
(England) Chesterton & Tragett	15	3
(England) Prior & Peterson	5	15	15
(Republic of Ireland) Plews & Plews	15	7	9
(England) Hawthorn & Hogarth	15	15
(England) Swinden & Douglass	4	4
(England) Marrett & Marrett	18	15
(England) Bache+ & Harvey	15	6

Semifinals
(England) Sautter & Mayston	15	15
(England) Prior & Peterson	3	11
(England) Hawthorn & Hogarth	15	15
(England) Marrett & Marrett	7	5

Final
(England) Sautter & Mayston	15	15
(England) Hawthorn & Hogarth	13	6

+ alias
