= 1914 All England Badminton Championships =

Tournament details
- Dates: 3 March 1914– 8 March 1914
- Edition: 16th
- Venue: Royal Horticultural Hall
- Location: Elverton Street, Westminster, London
- Official website: All England Championships

The 1914 All England Open Badminton Championships was a badminton tournament held at the Royal Horticultural Hall, Westminster, England from 3 March to 8 March 1914.

It would be the last Championship before being suspended for the duration of World War I. Defending champion Guy Sautter continued to play under the alias of U N Lappin and successfully defended his title. Lavinia Radeglia emulated Sautter by retaining her women's singles title.

In the Men's doubles Frank Chesterton & George Thomas retained the title. The instances of an alias being used continued, in addition to Sautter playing as Lappin, Archibald Engelbach played as A. Fee.

== Final results ==
Category	Winners	Runners-up	Score
Men's singles	(England) U. N. Lappin (Guy Sautter)	(England) Frank Chesterton	15–4, 15–10
Women's singles	(England) Lavinia Radeglia	(England) Mrs Bottomley	11–3, 11-5
Men's doubles	(England) Frank Chesterton & Sir George Thomas	(England) U. N. Lappin (Guy Sautter) & (England) Edward Hawthorn	17–16, 15–7
Women's doubles	(England) Margaret Tragett & Eveline Peterson	(England) Alice Gowenlock & Lavinia Radeglia	15-4, 16–18, 17–15
Mixed doubles	(England) Sir George Thomas & Hazel Hogarth	(England) Frank Chesterton & Margaret Tragett	15-10, 15-12

== Men's singles ==
There were four first round matches - Sautter bt R. M. McCallum 15–3, 15–12, Chesterton bt Henry Hosken 15–12, 15–8, Smith bt William Hockin 15–12, 15-5 and Hawthorn bt G. M. Hill 15–9, 15–9.

Second round
(England) U. N. Lappin (Guy Sautter)	15	15
(England) H. Smith	7	5
(Scotland) Dr. James Crombie	15	15
(Republic of Ireland) Johnnie McCallum	1	9
(England) P. W. Warden	6	15	15
(England) A. T. Butler	15	12	5
(England) W. H. S. Roper	15	18
(England) J. Hamilton	4	13
(England) Frank Chesterton	17	15
(England) Edward Hawthorn	16	12
(Scotland) C. J. Davidson	7	15	15
(England) Charles Pierson	15	5	10
(England) George Thomas	15	15
(England) William Swinden	12	8
(England) J. H. Colin Prior	15	15
(England) A. K. Jones	10	8

Quarterfinals
(England) Sautter	15	15
(Scotland) Crombie	4	4
(England) Warden	15	10	15
(England) Roper	6	15	12
(England) Chesterton
(Scotland) Davidson
(England) Thomas	15	15
(England) Prior	12	8

Semifinals
(England) Sautter	w/o
(England) Warden	scr
(England) Chesterton	5	15	15
(England) Thomas	15	10	7

Final
(England) Sautter	15	15
(England) Chesterton	4	10

== Women's singles ==
First round
(England) Lavinia Radeglia	15	15
(England) Kitty McKane	4	5
(England) Margaret Tragett	11	11
(England) Marjory East	6	9
(England) Mrs Bottomley	11	14
(Republic of Ireland) Catherine Trench	1	12
(England) Miss M. MacKenzie	11	9
(England) Lydia Swete	2	2	ret

Semifinals
(England) Radeglia	11	14
(England) Tragett	2	9
(England) Bottomley	15	15
(England) MacKenzie	4	0

Final
(England) Radeglia	11	11
(England) Bottomley	3	5

== Men's doubles ==
First round
(England) Frank Chesterton & George Thomas	15	15
(England) P. W. Warden & E. Phillips	5	8
(England) R. M. McCallum & A. W. Goodfellow	15	11	17
(England) R Franck & H. Smith	11	15	14
(Republic of Ireland) Bert Bisgood & (England) Stewart Massey	15	15
(Republic of Ireland) E. S. Dashwood & (Scotland) C. J.Davidson	2	5
(England) G. M. Hill & Frank Abbatt	15	18
(England) Charles Pierson & (Republic of Ireland) Johnnie McCallum	5	16
(England) U. N. Lappin (Guy Sautter) & Edward Hawthorn	12	15	15
(England) A. Fee+ & F. P. Pilkington	15	6	11
(England) Raoul du Roveray & Henry Hosken	15	15
(England) W. H. Roper & G. E. Mills	8	13
(Scotland) Dr. James Crombie & H. J. I. Inglis	17	15
(England) Robert Prust & William Swinden	15	10
(England) W R Hockiss & L C Shadwell

Quarterfinals
(England) Chesterton & Thomas	15	15
(England) Goodfellow & McCallum	11	6
(Republic of Ireland) Bisgood & (England) Massey	15	15
(England) Hill & Abbatt	9	7
(England) Sautter & Hawthorn	15	15
(England) du Roveray & Hosken	5	13
(Scotland) Crombie & Inglis	15	15
(England) Hockiss & Shadwell	3	5

Semifinals
(England) Chesterton & Thomas	15	17
(Republic of Ireland) Bisgood & (England) Massey	9	15
(England) Sautter & Hawthorn	15	15
(Scotland) Crombie & Inglis	8	7

Final
(England) Chesterton & Thomas	17	15
(England) Sautter & Hawthorn	16	7

+ alias

== Women's doubles ==
First round
(England) Margaret Tragett & Eveline Peterson	12	15	15
(Republic of Ireland) Catherine Trench & Violet Elton	15	9	10
(England) Mrs Marriott & Miss D. Drinkwater	11	15	15
(England) Lydia Swete & Miss MacKenzie	15	3	5
(England) Miss M. E. Mayston & Marjory East
bye
(England) Miss Denison & Mrs Woodcock
bye
(England) Lavinia Radeglia & Alice Gowenlock
bye
(England) Hazel Hogarth & Muriel Bateman
bye
(England) Christina Douglass & Miss Howard
bye
(England) Mrs Bottomley & (Republic of Ireland) Constance Pierson (née Ireland)	15	15
(England) Frances Drake & Constance Peterson	8	7

Quarterfinals
(England) Tragett & Peterson	18	15
(England) Marriott & Drinkwater	15	9
(England) Mayston & East	15	15
(England) Denison & Woodcock	7	1
(England) Gowenlock & Radeglia	15	15
(England) Hogarth & Bateman	11	13
(England) Douglass & Howard	15	15
(England) Bottomley & (Republic of Ireland) Pierson	8	7

Semifinals
(England) Tragett & Peterson	10	15	15
(England) Mayston & East	15	10	12
(England) Gowenlock & Radeglia	15	15
(England) Douglass & Howard	10	10

Final
(England) Tragett & Peterson	15	16	17
(England) Gowenlock & Radeglia	4	18	15

== Mixed doubles ==
There were three first round matches - McCallum & Drake bt Charles Pierson & Lydia Swete 15–5, 15–9, Bisgood & Gowenlock bt Inglis & Constance Pierson 18-13 15-9 and Uber & Hetley bt F. C. Lohden & Miss Drinkwater 15–9, 15–8.

Second round
(England) George Thomas & Hazel Hogarth	15	15
(Republic of Ireland) E. S Dashwood & (England) Dorothy Harvey	11	8
(England) J. H. Colin Prior & Eveline Peterson	15	15
(England) G. M. Hill & Miss Denison	6	8
(England) A Fee+ & Marjory East	15	15
(England) Stewart Massey & Muriel Bateman	8	9
(England) Herbert Uber & Miss Hetley	15	18
(England) R. M. McCallum & Frances Drake	8	12
(England) Frank Chesterton & Margaret Tragett	15	10	15
(Scotland) Dr. James Crombie & (England) Miss MacKenzie	10	15	7
(England) U. N. Lappin (Guy Sautter) & Miss M. E. Mayston	15	15
(Republic of Ireland) Bert Bisgood & (England) Alice Gowenlock	5	7
(England) Edward Hawthorn & Constance Peterson	15	15
(England) William Swinden & Christina Douglass	11	7
(England) Raoul du Roveray & Lavinia Radeglia	15	15
(Republic of Ireland) Johnnie McCallum & Catherine Trench	10	5

Quarterfinals
(England) Thomas & Hogarth	15	15
(England) Prior & Peterson	8	12
(England) Engelbach & East
(England) Uber & Hetley
(England) Chesterton & Tragett	15	15
(England) Sautter & Mayston	9	8
(England) Hawthorn & Peterson	15	15
(England) du Roveray & Radeglia	11	7

Semifinals
(England) Thomas & Hogarth	18	15
(England) Engelbach & East	17	5
(England) Chesterton & Tragett	w/o
(England) Hawthorn & Peterson	scr

Final
(England) Thomas & Hogarth	15	15
(England) Chesterton & Tragett	10	12
