= 1911 All England Badminton Championships =

Tournament details
- Dates: 22 February 1911– 27 February 1911
- Edition: 13th
- Venue: Royal Horticultural Hall
- Location: Elverton Street, Westminster, London
- Official website: All England Championships

The 1911 All England Badminton Championships was a badminton tournament held at the Royal Horticultural Hall, Westminster, England from February 22 to February 27, 1911.

The Championship events suffered from a lack of entries but other events such as the mixed doubles handicap attracted 50 pairs.

Frank Chesterton was unable to defend his singles title due to severe rheumatism. There were only three first round matches to determine quarter finalists.

== Final results ==
Category	Winners	Runners-up	Score
Men's singles	(England) Guy Sautter	(England) J. H. Colin Prior	15–6, 15–11
Women's singles	(England) Margaret Larminie	(England) Alice Gowenlock	11–9, 4-11, 11-4
Men's doubles	(England) Percy Fitton & Edward Hawthorn	(England) R. Franck & C. J. Greenwood	8-15, 15–3, 15–10
Women's doubles	(England) Alice Gowenlock & Dorothy Cundall	(England) Lavinia Radeglia & Margaret Larminie	15–12, 11-15, 15–12
Mixed doubles	(England) Sir George Thomas & Margaret Larminie	(England) Henry Marrett & Alice Gowenlock	15-11, 9-15, 15–7

== Men's singles ==
First round
(England) Guy Sautter	11	15	15
(England) Herbert Uber	15	3	2
(England) George Thomas	15	18
(England) H. Close	12	15
(Scotland) Dr. James Crombie
bye
(England) A. W. Andrews
bye
(England) R. P. Scott
bye
(Scotland) W. D. Bayne
bye
(England) Edward Hawthorn
bye
(England) J. H. Colin Prior	15	15
(England) Hugh Comyn	2	7

Quarterfinals
(England) Sautter	12	15	15
(England) Thomas	15	9	2
(Scotland) Crombie	15	15
(England) Andrews	8	12
(England) Scott	15	15
(Scotland) Bayne	2	3
(England) Hawthorn	2	12
(England) Prior	15	15

Semifinals
(England) Sautter	15	15
(Scotland) Crombie	5	7
(England) Scott	5	6
(England) Prior	15	15

Final
(England) Sautter	15	15
(England) Prior	6	11

== Women's singles ==
First round
(England) Margaret Larminie	13	11
(England) Lavinia Radeglia	12	4
(England) Dorothea Lambert Chambers	11	11
(England) Dorothy Cundall	2	0
(England) Alice Gowenlock	11	11
(England) Beddall	9	2
(England) Marjory East	11	11
(England) Woosnam	2	7

Semifinals
(England) Larminie	7	11	11
(England) Lambert-Chambers	11	5	5
(England) Gowenlock	11	11
(England) East	7	1

Final
(England) Larminie	11	4	11
(England) Gowenlock	9	11	4

== Men's doubles ==
First round
(England) George Thomas & Henry Marrett
bye
(England) Albert Prebble & Stewart Massey	15	15
(Scotland) Dr. James Crombie & H. J. H. Inglis	3	7
(England) Percy Fitton & Edward Hawthorn	15	15
(England) Capt. B. Hay & Capt. H. G. Hay	3	2
(England) V. C. Bent & Herbert Uber	15	15
(England) G. M. Hill & C. H. Middlemass	12	3
(England) R. Franck & C. J. Greenwood	7	17	15
(England) A. W. Andrews & H. Close	15	14	7
(England) Hugh Comyn & (Republic of Ireland) Bert Bisgood	15	4	15
(England) Guy Sautter & R. P. Scott	6	15	7
(England) G. E. Mills & Henry Daukes	15	15
(England) W. Fletcher & E. Milner	1	6
(Scotland) W. D. Bayne & (England) Frederick Philps
bye

Quarter finals
(England) Marrett & Thomas	15	18
(England) Prebble & Massey	8	16
(England) Fitton & Hawthorn	15	15
(England) Bent & Uber	11	3
(England) Franck & Greenwood	16	15	15
(England) Comyn & (Republic of Ireland) Bisgood	18	4	11
(England) Mills & Daukes	15	15
(Scotland) Bayne & (England) Philps	12	5

Semi finals
(England) Fitton & Hawthorn	10	15	15
(England) Marrett & Thomas	15	8	7
(England) Franck & Greenwood	15	15
(England) Mills & Daukes	10	11

Final
(England) Fitton & Hawthorn	8	15	15
(England) Franck & Greenwood	15	3	10

== Women's doubles ==
First round
(England) Alice Gowenlock & Dorothy Cundall
bye
(England) Dorothea Lambert Chambers & Dora Boothby
bye
(England) Margaret Larminie & Lavinia Radeglia	15	15
(England) Miss M. E. Mayston & Miss Mayston	9	11
(England) Frances Drake & (Republic of Ireland) Constance Ireland
bye

Semifinals
(England) Gowenlock & Cundall	15	15
(England) Chambers & Boothby	2	6
(England) Larminie & Radeglia	15	15
(England) Drake & (Republic of Ireland) Ireland	6	8

Final
(England) Gowenlock & Cundall	15	11	15
(England) Larminie & Radeglia	12	15	12

== Mixed doubles ==
First round
(England) Sir George Thomas & Margaret Larminie	15	15
(England) Hugh Comyn & Frances Drake	7	8
(England) C. J. Greenwood & M. E. Mayston
bye
(England) Stewart Massey & Dorothea Lambert Chambers	15	15
(England) J. H. Colin Prior & Eveline Peterson	8	6
(England) H. Close & Miss Harvey	15	15
(Scotland) W. B. Bayne & (England) Marjory East	6	7
(England) Henry Marrett & Alice Gowenlock	15	15
(England) Edward Hawthorn & Constance Peterson	12	7
(England) Capt. B. Hay & Cockburn
bye
(England) Percy Fitton & Lavinia Radeglia	15	15
(Scotland) Dr. James Crombie & Mrs Banson	12	10
(England) Guy Sautter & Dorothy Cundall	15	15
(England) Albert Prebble & Dora Boothby	3	2

Quarter finals
(England) Thomas & Larimnie	15	15
(England) Greenwood & Mayston	10	10
(England) Massey & Chambers	15	15
(England) Close & Harvey	5	6
(England) Marrett & Gowenlock	15	15
(England) Hay & Cockburn	3	2
(England) Fitton & Radeglia	18	15
(England) Sautter & Cundall	16	5

Semi finals
(England) Thomas & Larminie	15	15
(England) Massey & Chambers	7	11
(England) Marrett & Gowenlock	15	15
(England) Fitton & Radeglia	9	6

Final
(England) Thomas & Larminie	15	9	15
(England) Marrett & Gowenlock	11	15	7
