= 1912 All England Badminton Championships =

Tournament details
- Dates: 27 February 1912– 3 March 1912
- Edition: 14th
- Venue: Royal Horticultural Hall
- Location: Elverton Street, Westminster, London
- Official website: All England Championships

The 1912 All England Open Badminton Championships was a badminton tournament held at the Royal Horticultural Hall, Westminster, England from February 27 to March 3, 1912.

Frank Chesterton regained his men's singles title after missing the 1911 Championships. Former women's champion Ethel Thomson returned as Mrs Larcombe after several years absence and reached the singles before being beaten by the defending champion Margaret Tragett (also playing under her new married name).

Henry Norman Marrett played under the name A. N. Other.

== Final results ==
Category	Winners	Runners-up	Score
Men's singles	(England) Frank Chesterton	(England) Guy Sautter	15–10, 15–13
Women's singles	(England) Margaret Tragett	(England) Ethel Larcombe	11–14, 11–2, 14-13
Men's doubles	(England) Henry Marrett & Sir George Thomas	(England) Frank Chesterton & Guy Sautter	15–9, 15–12
Women's doubles	(England) Alice Gowenlock & Dorothy Cundall	(Republic of Ireland) Constance Ireland & (England) Frances Drake	15–2, 15–5
Mixed doubles	(England) Edward Hawthorn & Hazel Hogarth	(England) Percy Fitton & Lavinia Radeglia	17-16, 15-9

== Men's singles ==
First round
(England) Frank Chesterton	15	15
(England) Edward Hawthorn	3	1
(England) G. M. Hill	15	15
(Scotland) C. J. Davidson	2	7
(England) A. K. Jones	15	15
(England) Stephen Ziffo	8	4
(Scotland) W. B. Bayne	17	15
(England) H. A. Gardiner	16	5
(England) George Thomas	12	15	15
(England) J. H. Colin. Prior	15	12	5
(England) Herbert Uber	15	15
(England) C. H. Middlemas	11	1
(England) Guy Sautter	7	15	15
(England) Henry Marrett	15	7	9
(Republic of Ireland) Frederick A. Kennedy

Quarterfinals
(England) Chesterton	15	15
(England) Hill	4	4
(England) Jones	18	15
(Scotland) Bayne	15	6
(England) Thomas	15	15
(England) Uber	6	11
(England) Sautter	15	15
(Republic of Ireland) Kennedy	2	5

Semifinals
(England) Chesterton	15	15
(England) Jones	7	7
(England) Sautter	6	18	15
(England) Thomas	15	15	7

Final
(England) Chesterton	15	15
(England) Sautter	10	13

== Women's singles ==
First round
(England) Margaret Tragett
bye
(England) Ida Plomer-Walker
bye
(England) Marjory East
bye
(Republic of Ireland) Constance Ireland	11	11
(England) Frances Drake	9	2
(England) Ethel Larcombe
bye
(England) Lavinia Radeglia
bye
(England) Dorothy Cundall
bye
(Republic of Ireland) Catherine Trench
bye

Quarterfinals
(England) Tragett	11	11
(England) Plomer-Walker	2	5
(England) East	11	7	11
(Republic of Ireland) Ireland	6	11	7
(England) Larcombe	11	10	11
(England) Radeglia	5	13	1
(England) Cundall	11	11
(England) Trench	1	7

Semifinals
(England) Tragett	11	13
(England) East	5	10
(England) Larcombe	11	11
(England) Cundall	2	4

Final
(England) Tragett	11	11	14
(England) Larcombe	14	2	13

== Men's doubles ==
First round
(England) George Thomas & Henry Marrett	15	15
(England) R. Franck & Herbert Uber	7	4
(England) Edward Hawthorn & Percy Fitton
(England) Stewart Massey & (Republic of Ireland) Bert Bisgood
(Republic of Ireland) Frederick A. Kennedy & Francis O'Brien Kennedy
(England) Frank Chesterton & Guy Sautter
(Scotland) Dr. James Crombie & W. B. Bayne
(England) G. M. Hill & C. H. Middlemas
(Scotland) C J Davidson & (Republic of Ireland) E. S. Dashwood

Quarterfinals
(England) Marrett & Thomas	13	15	15
(England) Hawthorn & Fitton	15	8	13
(England) Massey & (Republic of Ireland) Bisgood	15	11	18
(Republic of Ireland) Kennedy & Kennedy	3	15	15
(England) Chesteton & Sautter	15	15
(Scotland) Crombie & Bayne	2	5
(England) Hill & Middlemass	15	15
(Scotland) Davidson & (Republic of Ireland) Dashwood	10	7

Semifinals
(England) Marrett & Thomas	15	15	15
(England) Massey & (Republic of Ireland) Bisgood	18	1	8
(England) Chesterton & Sautter	15	15
(England) Hill & Middlemass	2	10

Final
(England) Marrett & Thomas	15	15
(England) Chesterton & Sautter	9	12

== Women's doubles ==
First round
(England) Alice Gowenlock & Dorothy Cundall
bye
(England) Miss M. E. Mayston & Miss D. Harvey	15	15
(England) Miss C. Orr & Christina Douglass	4	2
(England) Ethel Larcombe & Hazel Hogarth
bye
(England) Margaret Tragett & Lavinia Radeglia
bye
(Republic of Ireland) Constance Ireland & (England) Frances Drake
bye
(England) Mrs Bartlett & Mrs Bottomley
bye
(Republic of Ireland) Catherine Trench & (Scotland) V. I. Todd	15	15
(England) Ida Plomer-Walker & Frances Bruere	11	12
(England) Lydia Swete & Miss J. Bretherton
bye

Quarterfinals
(England) Gownelock & Cundall	15	15
(England) Mayston & Harvey	2	3
(England) Larcombe & Hogarth	15	15
(England) Tragett & Radeglia	9	8
(Republic of Ireland) Ireland & (England) Drake	15	15
(England) Bartlett & Bottomley	11	5
(Republic of Ireland) Trench & (Scotland) Todd	15	15
(England) Swete & Bretherton	4	12

Semifinals
(England) Gowenlock & Cundall	5	15	15
(England) Larcombe & Hogarth	15	8	12
(Republic of Ireland) Ireland & (England) Drake	15	15
(Republic of Ireland) Trench & (Scotland) Todd	10	6

Final
(England) Gowenlock & Cundall	15	15
(Republic of Ireland) Ireland & (England) Drake	2	5

== Mixed doubles ==
In the first round Fitton & Radeglia defeated W. B. Bayne & Mrs Harvey 15–13, 15-7

Second round
(England) Edward Hawthorn & Hazel Hogarth	15	15
(Republic of Ireland) Frederick Trench & Catherine Trench	2	1
(England) Henry Marrett & Alice Gowenlock	15	15
(Republic of Ireland) E. S. Dashwood & Miss C. Johnstone	7	5
(England) Frank Chesterton & Miss D. Harvey	15	15
(Scotland) Dr. James Crombie & (England) Mrs Banson	9	14
(England) H. A. Gardiner & (Republic of Ireland) Constance Ireland	15	15
(England) G. M. Hill & Ida Plomer-Walker	9	8
(England) Percy Fitton & Lavinia Radeglia	15	15
(Republic of Ireland) Frederick A. Kennedy (England) Mrs Bottomley	1	7
(England) J. H. Colin Prior & Miss Eveline Peterson	15	14	15
(England) Frederick Philps & Miss M. E. Mayston	12	15	10
(England) Guy Sautter & Dorothy Cundall	15	10	15
(England) George Thomas & Margaret Tragett	4	15	12
(England) Stewart Massey & Ethel Larcombe	15	15
(Republic of Ireland) Francis O'Brien Kennedy & (Scotland) Miss V. I. Todd	4	0

Quarterfinals
(England) Hawthorn & Hogarth	17	2	15
(England) Marrett & Gowenlock	15	15	12
(England) Chesterton & Harvey	17	12	15
(England) Gardiner & (Republic of Ireland) Ireland	15	15	4
(England) Fitton & Radeglia	15	15
(England) Prior & Peterson	8	5
(England) Sautter & Cundall	15	15
(England) Massey & Larcombe	8	11

Semifinals
(England) Hawthorn & Hogarth	15	13	15
(England) Chesterton & Harvey	8	15	10
(England) Fitton & Radeglia	12	15	18
(England) Sautter & Cundall	15	10	17

Final
(England) Hawthorn & Hogarth	17	15
(England) Fitton & Radeglia	16	9
