= Bisgood =

Bisgood is a surname. Notable people with the surname include:

- Bert Bisgood (1881–1968), English cricketer, brother of Eustace
- Eustace Bisgood (1878–1958), English cricketer
- Jeanne Bisgood (1923–2024), English golfer, daughter of Bert
