= Royal Horticultural Hall =

Royal Horticultural Hall may refer to either of two halls owned by London's Royal Horticultural Society:

- Lawrence Hall, London, the newer of the halls, currently leased as a sports centre
- Lindley Hall, London, the older of the halls
