= J. M. Archer Thomson =

British rock climber and mountaineer

The Climbs on Lliwedd (1909) by J. M. Archer Thomson and A. W. Andrews, is possibly the world's first dedicated rock-climing guidebook.

James Merriman Archer Thomson (5 February 1863 – 31 July 1912) was a British rock-climber and mountaineer. Thomson climbed extensively in North Wales with others such as Oscar Eckenstein. He was a believer in leading on sight, and was not keen on O. G. Jones's practice of surveying a route with a top-rope. He extensively explored the cliffs of Lliwedd, and in 1909 with A. W. Andrews, produced the first official rock-climbing guidebook to the cliff (published by the then-recently founded Climbers' Club). He authored the second, to the Ogwen District, the following year. From 1896 until his death (by suicide, he drank carbolic acid) in 1912 he was Headmaster of Llandudno County School.
