= Norman Wood (badminton) =

English badminton player

Sport
- Country: England
- Sport: Badminton
Medal record
Representing ENG
All England Open Badminton Championships
Gold medal – first place	1906 London	singles
Gold medal – first place	1907 London	singles
Gold medal – first place	1907 London	doubles
Gold medal – first place	1908 London	mixed

Norman Wood was a male badminton player from England.

Wood won the All England Open Badminton Championships in men's singles in 1906 and 1907.
