= Eustace Bisgood =

English cricketer

Personal information
- Full name: Eustace Denis Piers Bisgood
- Born: 6 February 1878; Glastonbury, Somerset, England
- Died: 4 March 1958 (aged 80); Sidmouth, Devon, England

Domestic team information
- Years: Team
- 1909: Somerset
- Only First-class: 19 July 1909 Somerset v Kent

Career statistics
Competition	First-class
Matches	1
Runs scored	6
Batting average	3.00
100s/50s	0/0
Top score	6
Catches/stumpings	1/–
- Source: ESPNcricinfo, 3 September 2013

Eustace Denis Piers Bisgood (6 February 1878 – 4 March 1958) was an English cricketer who made one first-class appearance for Somerset in 1909.

== Life and career ==
Eustace Bisgood was born in Glastonbury, Somerset on 6 February 1878. Bisgood's younger brother, Bertram, played for Somerset 67 times between 1907 and 1921, during which time Somerset often struggled to find eleven players to field in their matches. Sammy Woods, who was the club captain until 1906, commented on the period after his captaincy, stating that in one year, "more than 30 people played, some, as you may imagine, very poor performers." It was during this time that Bisgood made his solitary appearance for Somerset, travelling with the team to Gravesend to play a County Championship match against Kent in 1909. Bisgood batted in both innings, and along with his brother, was one of three Somerset players to be dismissed for a duck in the first innings. In the second, he scored six runs, having taken a catch during Kent second innings. Somerset lost the match by 279 runs.

At his death in Sidmouth, Devon, on 4 March 1958, Bisgood was described as a "retired stock jobber".
