= Arthur Cave =

Irish badminton player (1883–1948)

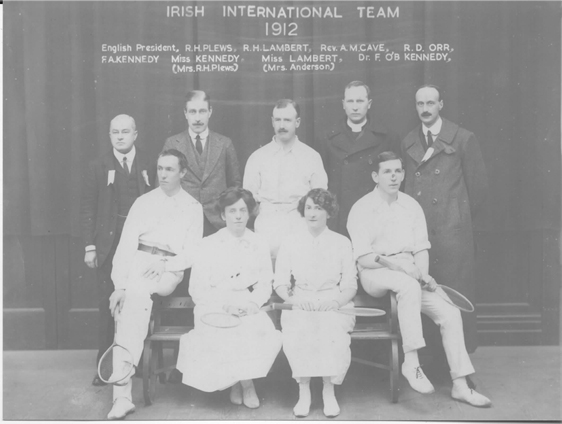

Personal information
- Born: 13 April 1883 Cork
- Died: 1948 Clontarf

Sport
- Country: Ireland
- Sport: Badminton

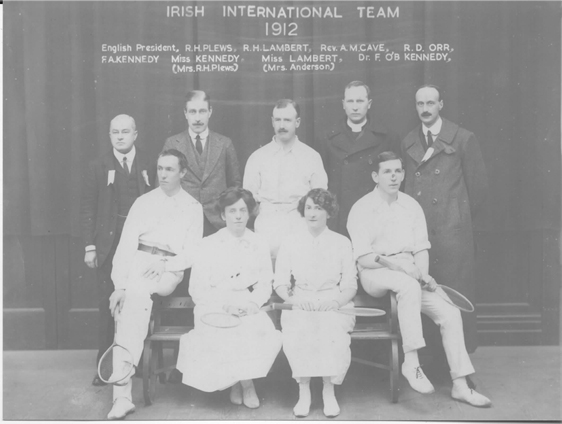
Arthur Cave with the Irish International Badminton team in 1912.

Reverend Arthur Meagher Cave (1883–1948), was a male Irish badminton international.

== Badminton career ==
Cave won three consecutive Irish Open titles from 1907 to 1909. His siblings William Frances Cave and Henry Charles Cave were also Irish international players and competed in the All England Open Badminton Championships.

He was the runner-up in the singles at the 1908 All England Badminton Championships.
