= Albert Prebble =

English badminton and tennis player and official

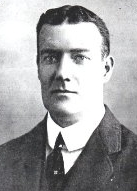
- English tennis and badminton player

Personal information
- Born: 22 October 1873
- Died: 27 August 1946 (aged 72)

Sport
- Country: England
- Sport: Badminton

Albert Davis Prebble (22 October 1873 – 27 August 1946) was an English badminton and tennis player and a prominent badminton official. He captained the England badminton team in their first international match against Ireland in 1903. He won the All England badminton men's doubles three times. He also won the badminton mixed doubles in 1909 with Dora Boothby, the same year that he reached the Wimbledon Championships mixed doubles final with the same partner.

He was vice-president of the English Badminton Association from 1922 to 1946).

== Tennis ==
=== Grand Slam finals ===
Mixed doubles: 1 runner-up

Result	Year	Championship	Surface	Partner	Opponents	Score
Loss	1919	Wimbledon	Grass	(United Kingdom) Dorothea Lambert Chambers	(United States) Elizabeth Ryan (United Kingdom) Randolph Lycett	0–6, 0–6

== Badminton ==
Medal record at the All England Badminton Championships.

Medal	Year	Event
Gold medal – first place	1904	Men's doubles
Silver medal – second place	1904	Mixed doubles
Silver medal – second place	1905	Men's doubles
Silver medal – second place	1906	Men's doubles
Gold medal – first place	1907	Men's doubles
Silver medal – second place	1907	Mixed doubles
Gold medal – first place	1909	Men's doubles
Gold medal – first place	1909	Mixed doubles
