= Hazel Hogarth =

English badminton player

Personal information
- Born: 25 April 1882 India
- Died: 1 June 1940 (aged 58) London

Sport
- Country: England
- Sport: Badminton

Hazel de Bohun Hogarth (April 25, 1882 – June 1, 1940) was an English badminton and tennis player. Hogarth was capped by England thirteen times between 1904 and 1929 and was attributed as being the player who innovated the backhand serve. She had great success at the All England Championships winning eleven titles.

She also played tennis and competed at The Championships, Wimbledon from 1920 to 1928.

== Medal Record at the All England Badminton Championships ==
Medal	Year	Event
Gold medal – first place	1905	Mixed doubles
Gold medal – first place	1912	Mixed doubles
Gold medal – first place	1913	Women's doubles
Gold medal – first place	1914	Mixed doubles
Gold medal – first place	1920	Mixed doubles
Gold medal – first place	1921	Mixed doubles
Gold medal – first place	1922	Women's doubles
Gold medal – first place	1922	Mixed doubles
Gold medal – first place	1923	Women's doubles
Gold medal – first place	1925	Women's doubles
Gold medal – first place	1927	Women's doubles
