= A. W. Andrews =

British geographer, poet, rock-climber, mountaineer and tennis/badminton player

Coordinates: 50.17462°N 5.62456°W

A.W. Andrews
- Full name: Arthur Westlake Andrews
- Country (sports): England
- Born: 12 December 1868 Hastings, England
- Died: 22 November 1959 (aged 90) Zennor, England

Grand Slam singles results
- Wimbledon: 3R (1909)

Grand Slam doubles results
- Wimbledon: 3R (1909)

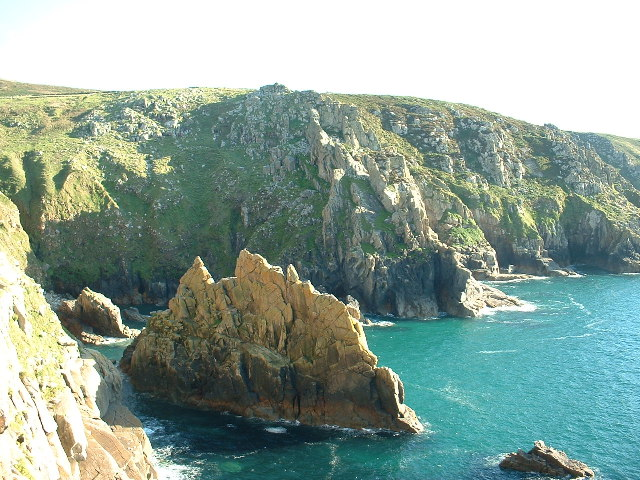
Portmoina Cove with Commando Ridge on the mainland behind the island.

Arthur Westlake Andrews (12 December 1868 – 22 November 1959) was a British geographer, poet, rock-climber, mountaineer and amateur tennis and badminton player.

He was the son of clergyman and amateur geologist William Ryton Andrews and writer Marian Andrews. They lived in Teffont Evias, Wiltshire, from 1873 to 1892, and here Arthur spent his childhood climbing trees and walking on the hills.

He trained as a geographer (FRGS 1896), and became a teacher of geography and history in Southwark. In 1913 he published "a text-book of geography", reprinted in 1922.

== Climber ==
As a climber, his first contribution appears to have been, in 1899, the alpine climbing route now called Andrews' Renne on Storen, Norway.

He is especially remembered for two later climbing contributions: for his co-authorship, with J. M. A. Thomson in 1909 of the first rock-climbing guidebook, to the cliffs of Lliwedd, in Snowdonia titled The Climbs on Lliwedd ; and for being the 'father' of Cornish sea-cliff climbing, beginning with an early ascent (1902) of the Bosigran Ridge Climb (aka Commando Ridge grid reference SW413368), followed by Ledge Climb (also Bosigran) in 1905. With E. C. Pyatt he later produced the first official (Climbers' Club) Cornish climbing guide, in 1950.

He is also believed to have had a project to traverse all the British coastline, between the high and low water marks, aided where necessary by a rope, starting in Cornwall.

== Tennis ==
He once reached the semi- finals of the men’s singles at Wimbledon.

== Badminton ==
He was a regular competitor at the All England Open Badminton Championships first appearing at the 1905 All England Badminton Championships and last appearing at the 1923 All England Badminton Championships.
