= Hugh Comyn =

English civil servant and sportsman

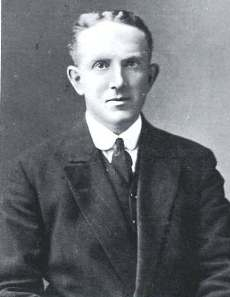
- Full name: Henry Hugh Comyn
- Country (sports): England
- Born: 1 November 1876
- Died: 8 April 1937 (aged 60)

Singles

Grand Slam singles results
- Wimbledon: 2R (1906)

Doubles

Grand Slam doubles results
- Wimbledon: 2R (1907)

Henry Hugh Comyn (1 November 1876 – 8 April 1937) was an English civil servant and sportsman. He competed in the Wimbledon Championships in 1906 and 1907 and was an open champion in badminton in mixed doubles in 1908, 1909 and 1910.

== Life ==
Comyn was the son of Charles James Bourchier Comyn of Marle Place, Brenchley, Kent. He was at Dulwich College from July 1890 to 1892. In 1898 he was a clerk in the Metropolitan Police receivers office. He was a lieutenant in the Territorial Army in the 2nd South Middlesex regiment in 1900. He saw service in the Second Anglo-Boer War in the King's Royal Rifles.

Comyn entered the 1906 Wimbledon Championships – Men's singles and was beaten by J.M.Flavelle in the second round. In the 1907 Wimbledon Championships – Men's singles he lost in the first round to Percy Fitton. He played badminton for England between 1907 and 1911 and won the men's doubles in the Scottish Open three times. In 1908 he partnered Frank Chesterton and in 1909 and 1910 he partnered George Alan Thomas. He also rowed for Twickenham Rowing Club.

Comyn became chief accountant at the Metropolitan Police. Comyn died at the age of 60 at Angmering-on Sea .

== Family ==
Comyn married Muriel Annie Edith Bourne, daughter of Alfred Allinson Bourne, assistant master at Cheltenham College. They had no children and were divorced in 1926. Comyn was the brother of William Leslie Comyn, California shipbuilder.

== Badminton results table ==
Season	Competition	Discipline	Position	Name
1908	Scottish Open	Men's doubles	1	Frank Chesterton / Hugh Comyn
1909	Scottish Open	Men's doubles	1	George Alan Thomas / Hugh Comyn
1910	Scottish Open	Men's doubles	1	George Alan Thomas / Hugh Comyn
