= London Rifle Brigade =

1st London (City of London Volunteer Rifle Brigade) Rifle Volunteer Corps 5th (City of London) Battalion, London Regiment (London Rifle Brigade)
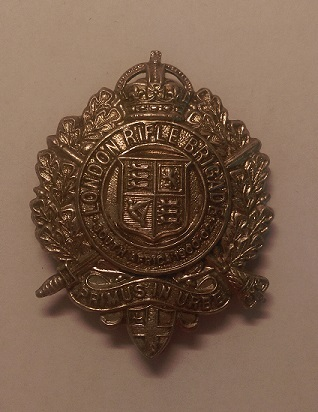
- Cap badge of the London Rifle Brigade.
- Active: 14 December 1859 – 1 May 1960
- Allegiance: United Kingdom
- Branch: British Army
- Type: Infantry
- Size: Battalion
- Part of: London Regiment; Rifle Brigade (The Prince Consort's Own)
- Garrison/HQ: Bunhill Row drill hall (1893–1940)
- Service: First World War; Second World War

The London Rifle Brigade was a volunteer regiment of the British Army.

== History ==
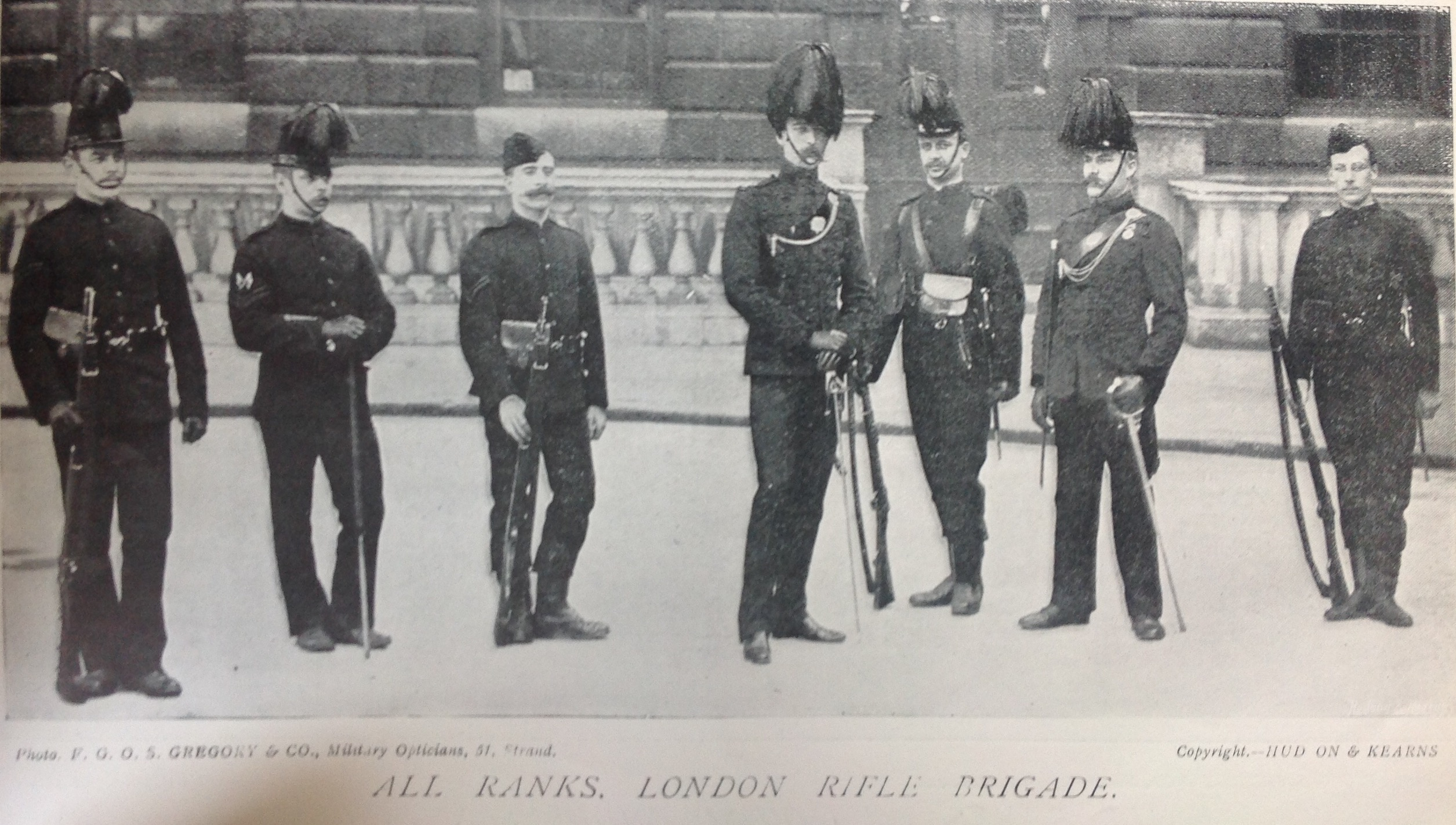
Group, London Rifle Brigade, 1896

The regiment was first raised in the City of London on 14 December 1859 as 1st London (City of London Volunteer Rifle Brigade) Rifle Volunteer Corps, a rifle volunteer unit made up of five companies. On 1 July 1881 it was made part of the King's Royal Rifle Corps as its 9th Volunteer Battalion. Ten years later, in December 1891, it was renamed the 1st London Volunteer Rifle Corps (City of London Volunteer Rifle Brigade). One of its early officers was Sir Charles Hunter. In 1893 its headquarters was moved to 130 Bunhill Row in the Metropolitan Borough of Finsbury (now the London Borough of Islington). When the volunteer and militia units were re-organised as the Territorial Force (TF) in 1908 the unit was again renamed, becoming the 5th (City of London) Battalion of the new London Regiment.

=== First World War ===
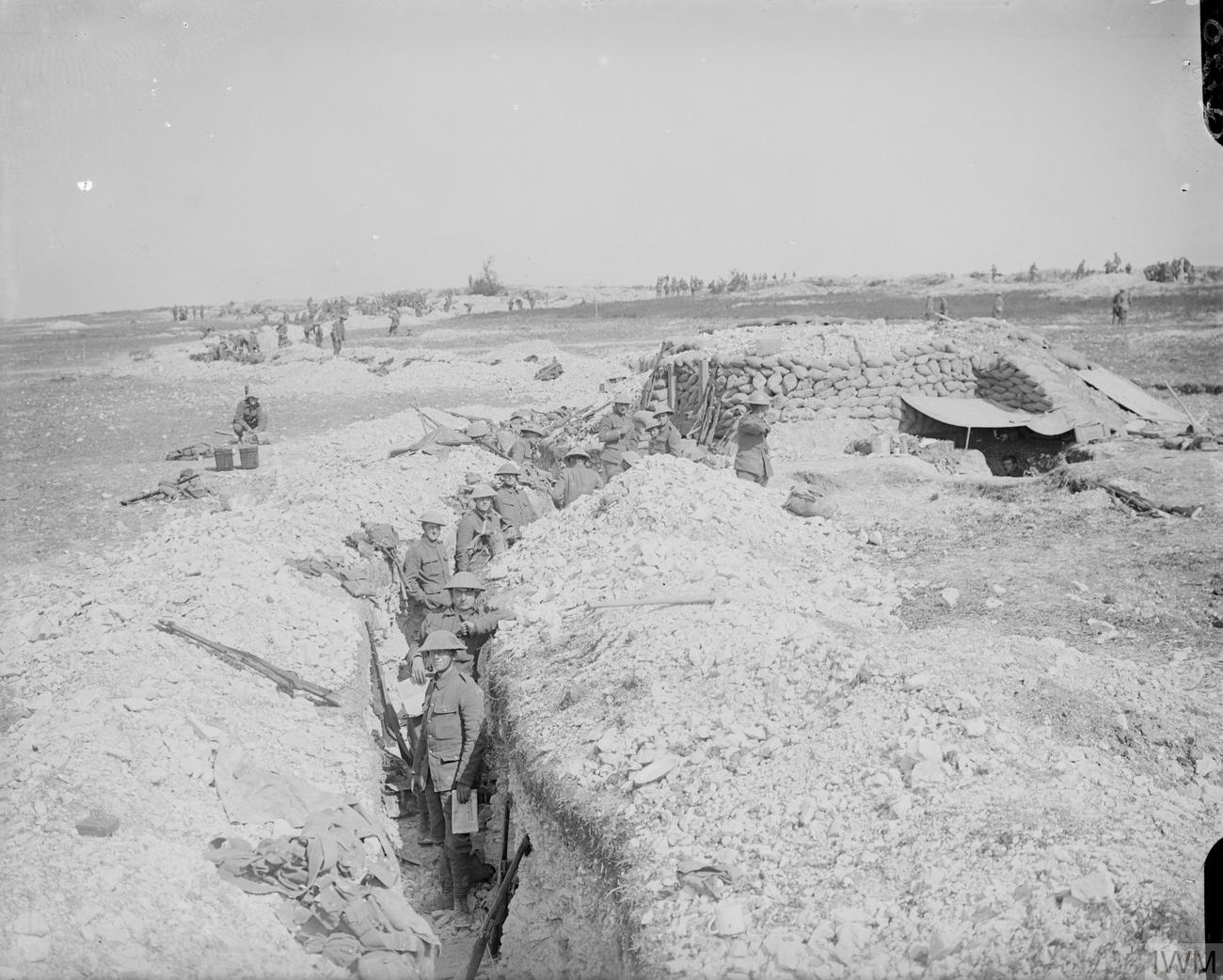
Troops of the 1/5th Battalion (London Rifle Brigade), London Regiment, in a reserve trench in Chimpanzee Valley between Hardecourt and Guillemont, 6 September 1916.

On the outbreak of the First World War in August 1914 it formed a part of the 2nd London Brigade within the 1st London Division. It was mobilised and sent to Bisley. It was moved to Crowborough in September 1914 and landed in France on 5 November, at Le Havre, upon which it left 1st London Division. On 19 May 1915 it was transferred to General Headquarters (GHQ) Troops to form a composite unit with the 1/12th and 1/13th Battalions of the London Regiment, though this only lasted until the following 11 August, when the three battalions regained their original identities. On 25 October 1915 the battalion was transferred to 8th Brigade in 3rd Division.

One of the unit's lieutenant colonels during the conflict was Charles Burnell. On 10 February 1916, it moved again, into the 169th Brigade, part of the 56th (London) Division. It was transferred to the corps of the Rifle Brigade (Prince Consort's Own) on 7 July the same year, though it still also remained a battalion of the London Regiment.

=== Later history ===
The regiment was disbanded in 1919 and reformed in the Territorial Army (TA) in 1920, and was renamed again as 5th City of The London Regiment (London Rifle Brigade) in 1922, then as London Rifle Brigade, The Rifle Brigade (Prince Consort's Own) in 1937. Engine 6166 of the LMS Royal Scot Class was named after the unit in October 1930.

'1st Battalion' was added to the unit's name on 31 March 1939 when a duplicate 2nd Battalion was formed, when the TA was ordered to double in size, shortly before the outbreak of the Second World War. The London Rifle Brigade remained at the Bunhill Row drill hall until it was destroyed by bombing in 1940 / 1941.

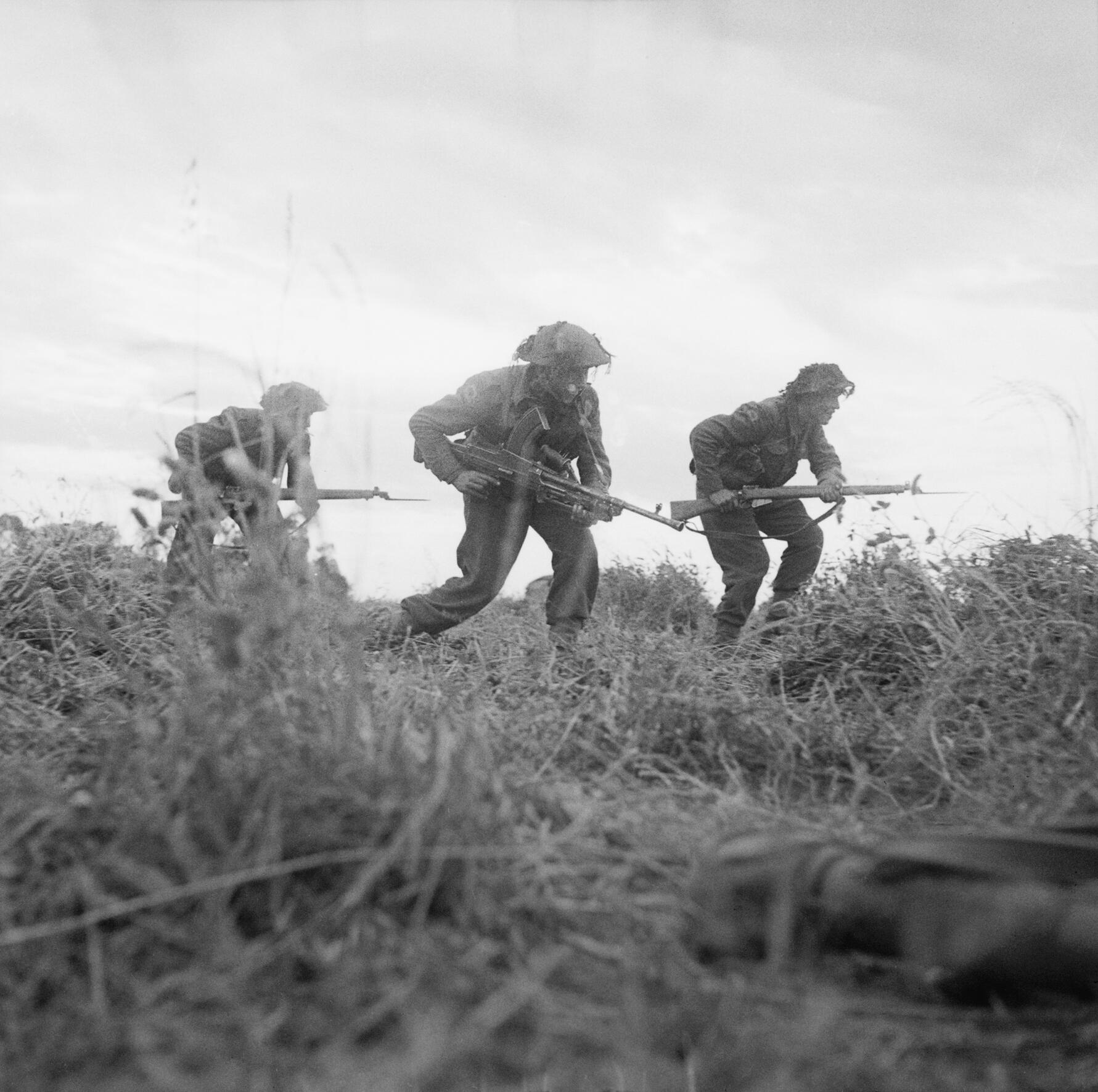
Infantrymen of the 8th Battalion, Rifle Brigade (Prince Consort's Own) (London Rifle Brigade) move forward cautiously near Éterville, Normandy, 29 June 1944.

Two of the unit's Second World War officers were Donough O'Brien and Dickie Burnell. The 1st Battalion, London Rifle Brigade was originally serving as part of the 2nd London Brigade of the 1st London Division, and later served as the motorised infantry element of the 23rd Armoured Brigade, part of the 8th Armoured Division. The battalion became the 7th Battalion, Rifle Brigade (Prince Consort's Own) (London Rifle Brigade) on 18 January 1941 and fought in the North African Campaign in 1942, later transferring to the 7th Motor Brigade, then part of the 7th Armoured Division, but soon became part of the 1st Armoured Division. The battalion joined the 8th and 9th Armoured Brigades, finally transferring to the 61st Lorried Infantry Brigade of the 6th Armoured Division in May 1944 and fought in the Italian campaign.

The 2nd Battalion, London Rifle Brigade was originally serving with the 5th London Infantry Brigade of the 2nd London Division, before transferring to the 29th Armoured Brigade of the 11th Armoured Division. The battalion was redesignated the 8th Battalion, Rifle Brigade (Prince Consort's Own) (London Rifle Brigade) on 17 January 1941 and fought in North-West Europe from June 1944 until May 1945.

On 1 April 1947 it absorbed the duplicate 8th Battalion and was renamed the London Rifle Brigade, The Rifle Brigade (Prince Consort's Own). On 1 May 1960 it amalgamated with The Rangers, with the new unit going under the name London Rifle Brigade/Rangers, whose successor unit was part of the 4th (Volunteer) Battalion Royal Green Jackets. This later became G (Royal Green Jackets) Company of the current London Regiment and now G Company, 7th Battalion The Rifles.

== Memorials ==
The London Rifle Brigade was one of the units that cut its badge into the chalk downs at Fovant during the First World War, whilst its memorial tablet and roll of honour for the World Wars is located in St Botolph-without-Bishopsgate and its regimental museum is effectively the Royal Green Jackets (Rifles) Museum in Winchester.

== Sources ==
- Bellis, Malcolm A. (1994). Regiments of the British Army 1939–1945 (Armour & Infantry). London: Military Press International. ISBN 0-85420-999-9.
- J.B.M. Frederick, Lineage Book of British Land Forces 1660–1978, Vol I, Wakefield: Microform Academic, 1984, ISBN 1-85117-007-3.
- Maj R.H.W.S. Hastings, The Rifle Brigade in the Second World War 1939–1945, Aldershot: Gale & Polden, 1950/Uckfield: Naval & Military, 2004, ISBN 978-1-4745-3670-7.
- Joslen, H. F. (2003) [1960]. Orders of Battle: Second World War, 1939–1945. Uckfield, East Sussex: Naval and Military Press. ISBN 978-1-84342-474-1.
