= Eveline Peterson =

English badminton player

Personal information
- Born: 17 January 1877 Jalpaiguri, British India
- Died: 1944 (aged 67) Totnes, Devon

Sport
- Country: United Kingdom
- Sport: Badminton

Eveline Grace Peterson (17 January 1877 – 1944) was an English female badminton player. She mainly competed in the All England Open Badminton Championships, Scottish Open and Irish Open from the 1910s to the late 1920s.

Peterson was born in Jalpaiguri, British India, to civil servant Frederick William Voysey Peterson and Mary Ann Jefford Hopewell. The family later moved to 12 Ildersly Grove in Dulwich. She achieved her maiden Championship title in her career after claiming the women's doubles title during the 1914 All England Badminton Championships partnering with Margaret Tragett. Peterson won the mixed doubles titles as a part of the 1926 All England Badminton Championships and 1927 All England Badminton Championships pairing with Irish male badminton player Frank Devlin. She also won the women's doubles titles in the Scottish Open Championships in 1921 and 1922.
