= Dorothy Cundall =

English badminton player

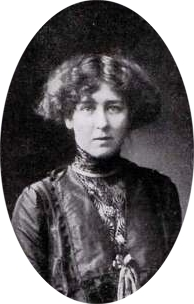
- Cundall in 1910

Personal information
- Born: Dorothy Ursula Cundall; 19 October 1882 Richmond, Surrey
- Died: 8 February 1954 (aged 71) Bournemouth, Hampshire

Sport
- Country: England
- Sport: Badminton

Dorothy Ursula Cundall (1882 – 8 February 1954) was an English badminton player. Born in 1882 in Richmond, Surrey, she was a prominent player before the First World War, winning three All England titles.

In 1912 she married Douglas Harvey (who died in 1917). Cundall played as Mrs Harvey afterwards. In 1922 she remarried to Bert Bisgood, a prominent Somerset cricketer who also represented Ireland at badminton. She had two children, Ian Harvey, a Conservative MP, and Jeanne Bisgood, an English international golfer.

She died in Bournemouth on 8 February 1954.

== Medal Record at the All England Badminton Championships ==
Medal	Year	Event
Gold medal – first place	1910	Mixed doubles
Gold medal – first place	1911	Women's doubles
Gold medal – first place	1912	Women's doubles
