= Percy Fitton =

English badminton player

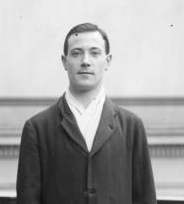
- P. D. Fitton, English badminton player

Personal information
- Born: 24 May 1881 Hendon
- Died: 30 December 1946 (aged 65) Oxford

Sport
- Country: England
- Sport: Badminton

Percy Douglas Fitton (1881–1946), was a male badminton player from England.

== Badminton career ==
Fitton born in Hendon was a winner of the All England Open Badminton Championships. He won the men's doubles in 1911.
