= Muriel Bateman =

Indian-born English badminton player

Personal information
- Born: 18 May 1883 British India
- Died: 19 June 1961 (aged 78) Christchurch, Dorset

Sport
- Country: England
- Sport: Badminton

Muriel Kathleen Bateman married name Muriel Flaxman (1883-1961) was an English international badminton player.

== Badminton career ==
Muriel was a winner of the All England Open Badminton Championships. She won the women's 1910 All England Badminton Championships and 1913 All England Badminton Championships doubles.

Additionally she won the Irish Open in 1907, 1909 and 1910, and the French Open in 1910, 1911, 1912 and 1914.
