= Bert Bisgood =

English cricketer (1881–1968)

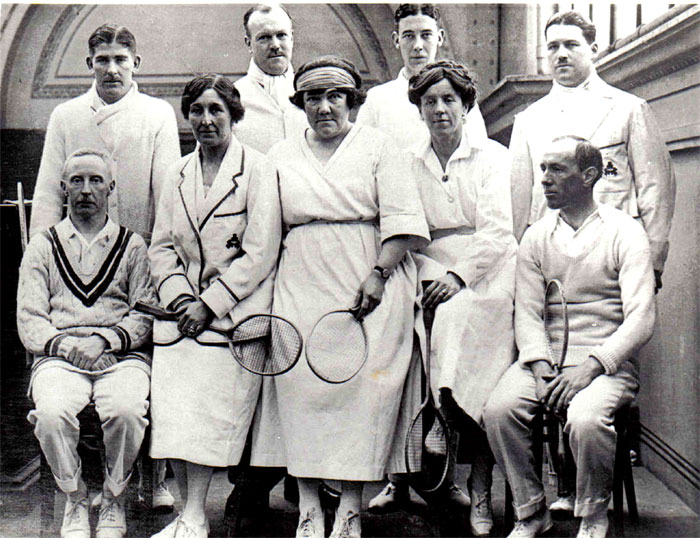

Personal information
- Full name: Bertram Lewis Bisgood
- Born: 11 March 1881; Glastonbury, Somerset, England
- Died: 19 July 1968 (aged 87); Canford Cliffs, Dorset, England
- Batting: Right-handed
- Role: Batsman
- Relatives: Eustace Bisgood (brother)

Domestic team information
- Years: Team
- 1907–1921: Somerset
- FC debut: 20 June 1907 Somerset v Worcestershire
- Last FC: 23 May 1921 Somerset v Cambridge University

Career statistics
Competition	First-class
Matches	67
Runs scored	2,143
Batting average	18.79
100s/50s	2/7
Top score	116*
Catches/stumpings	23/1
- Source: CricketArchive, 8 May 2010

Bertram Lewis Bisgood (11 March 1881 – 19 July 1968) was a cricketer who played first-class cricket for Somerset from 1907 to 1921 as a batsman and wicketkeeper. He was also a badminton player. Known as "Bert" or "Bertie", he was born at Glastonbury and died at Canford Cliffs, Dorset. His older brother Eustace played in one match for Somerset in 1909.

== Cricket ==
Bisgood was a right-handed middle-order batsman and occasional wicketkeeper. He made a sensational debut for Somerset in 1907, being picked for the match against Worcestershire at Worcester when the Somerset captain, Lionel Palairet, was struggling to find enough players to make up a side. In Somerset's first innings, he came in at No 3 when Palairet was out for a single and proceeded to score 82 in a second wicket stand of 153 with Len Braund; in the second, he made an unbeaten 116 enabling Somerset to declare, though the match was eventually drawn. Bisgood was the first Somerset cricketer to score a century on debut; the second would be Harold Gimblett in 1935.

Bisgood went on to make 66 further appearances for Somerset up to 1921, but only once did he come close to matching his success in that first game. He played in nine further matches in 1907 without passing 50 once; after 11 matches in 1908 and eight in 1909, his next score of more than 50 came in 1910; there were two scores of 50 or more in both 1911 and 1912 seasons. In 1914, however, in the match against Gloucestershire at Taunton, Bisgood had a second triumph. In the first innings, he made 116 in three hours, the second century of his career equalling his first; then in the second innings he led Somerset to a rare victory by making an unbeaten 78 out of a total of 134 for three wickets, made in 70 minutes.

Bisgood reappeared after the First World War in two matches in the 1919 season and then in two university matches in 1921. He served as a lieutenant in the Royal Garrison Artillery during the war.

== Badminton ==
Bisgood played badminton at international level and represented Ireland on several occasions. His relationship to Ireland was due to his parents who were both Irish. He was also a regular competitor at the All England Open Badminton Championships. In 1922 he married England international badminton player Dorothy Cundall (who was known as Mrs Harvey and was a widow at the time).
