= Lindley Hall, London =

Lindley Hall
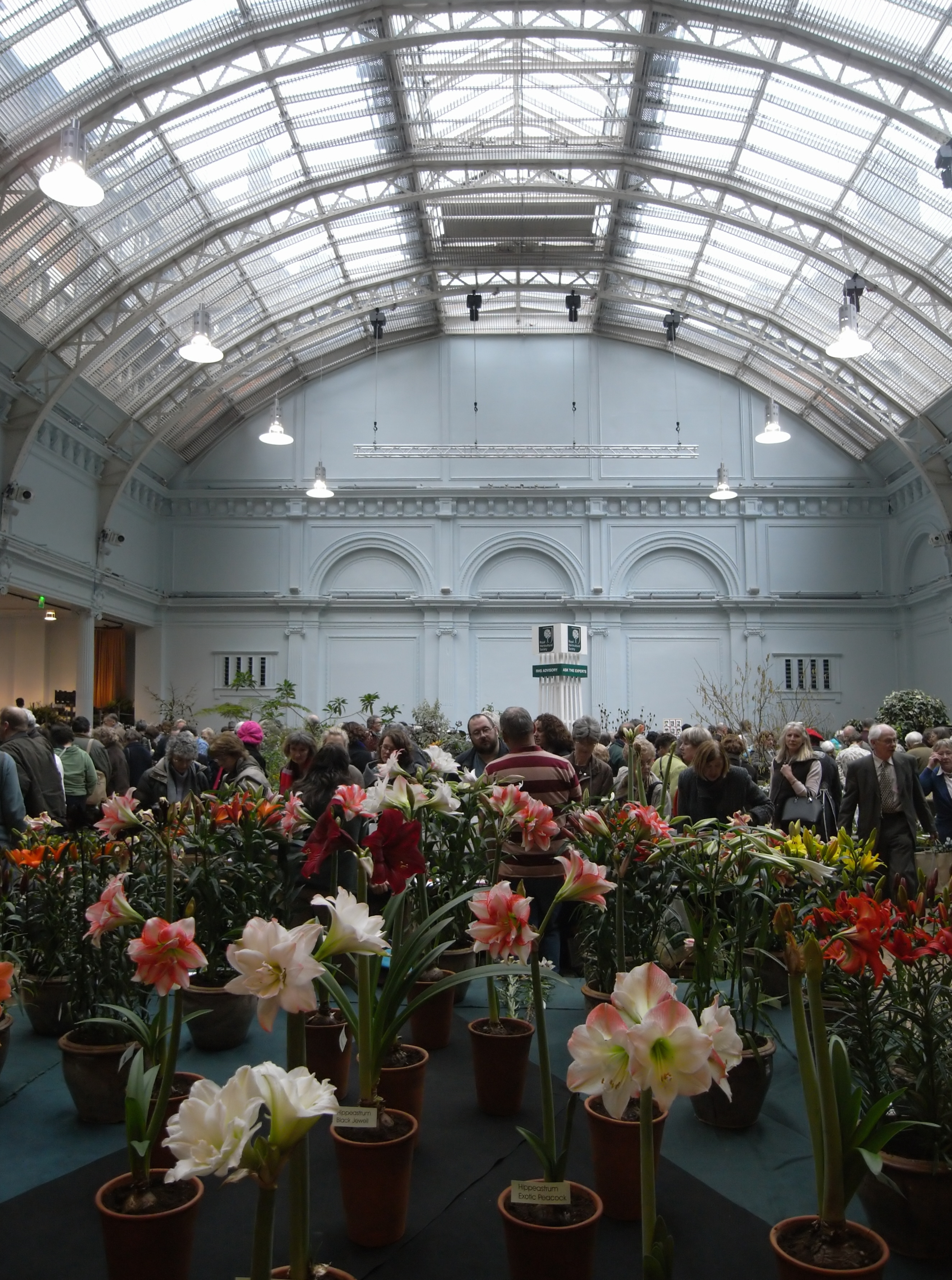
- London flower show in Lindley Hall

- Location within Central London
- 51°29′40″N 0°08′05″W
- Location: City of Westminster, London, England, United Kingdom

History
- Built: 1904

Site notes
- Architect: Edwin J Stebbs
- Architectural styles: Edwardian, Renaissance, Arts and Crafts

Listed Building – Grade II
- Designated: 1970
- Country: United Kingdom

Lindley Hall in Elverton Street, Westminster, London is the older of the two Royal Horticultural Halls and is owned by RHS Enterprises Limited, which is part of the charity Royal Horticultural Society in central London. The other is Lawrence Hall, which is no longer owned by the RHS; both are close to Vincent Square.

Although built as an exhibition hall, Lindley Hall is increasingly used for product launches, conferences, fashion shows, banquets, weddings and other events.

== History ==
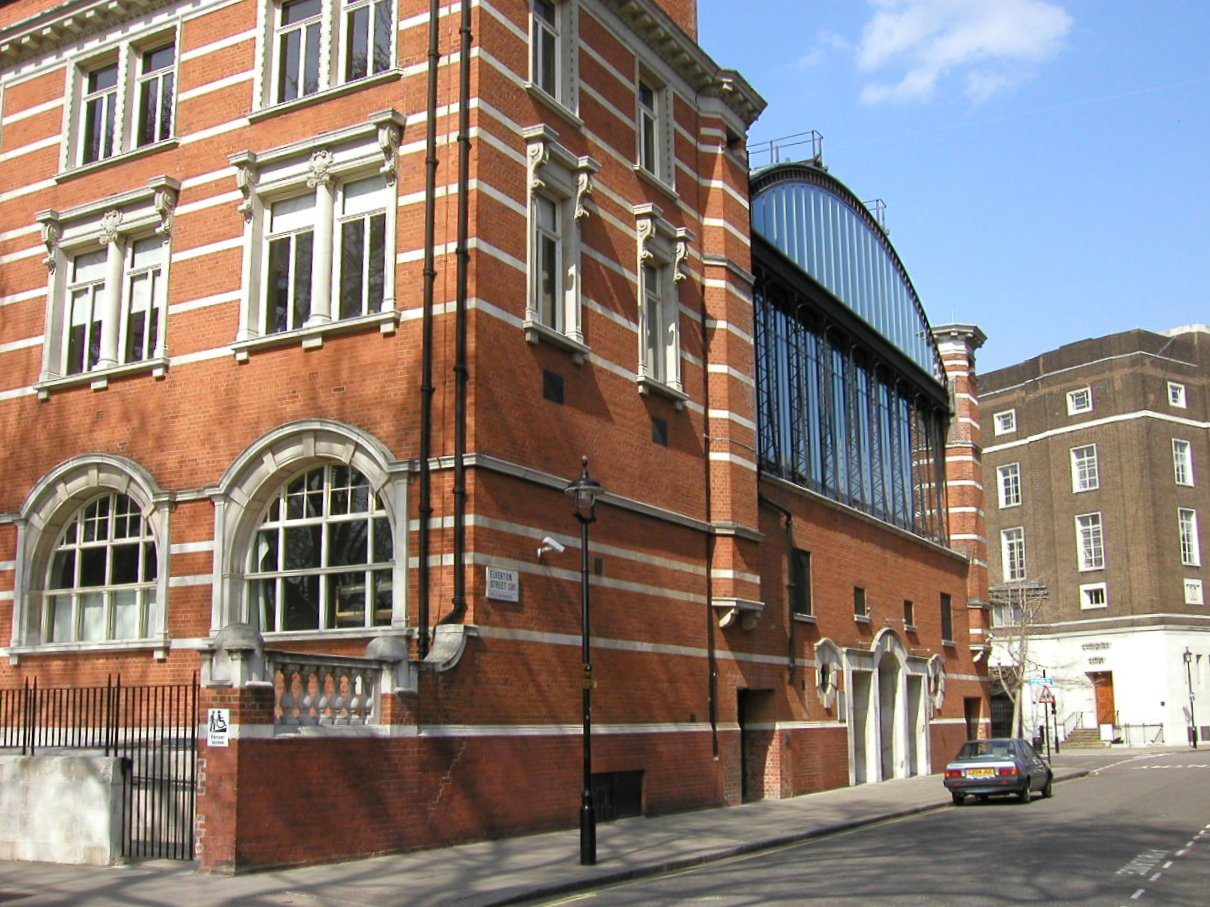
Lindley Hall (right), behind 80 Vincent Square

It was the monarch King Edward VII who had mooted the idea of the Royal Horticultural Society having a purpose-built exhibition hall for its shows. Lindley Hall was designed by Edwin J Stebbs and was built in 1904 of red brick with stone dressings and banding, with Arts and Crafts features and Renaissance details. His focus on achieving as much natural light as possible remains a key part of the character of the building, though complete blackout is also possible. It is noted for its classic Edwardian architecture.

On 22 July 1904, together with the Society's patron Queen Alexandra, King Edward VII officially declared the venue open.

The hall hosted the All England Open Badminton Championships from 1910 to 1939. It was registered as a Grade II listed building in 1970.

It is named after the English botanist John Lindley. The Lindley Library, based on his collection, is also managed by the RHS on the same site.

== Interior ==
Area	Dimensions
Main Hall	36m × 22m
Annex	13.4m × 6.3m
Gallery	16m × 4.5m
Gross space	875m^{2}
Ceiling Height	13.5m at highest point

== Events ==
Events held at the hall include:

- 1946 World Snooker Championship
- Marks & Spencer Womenswear Launch (2003)
- International Peace Conference (2005)
- Lancôme Colour Design Awards (2006)
- Stella McCartney Spring/Summer Collection Fashion Show (2009)
- Tom Ford Spring/Summer 2015 show for London Fashion Week (2014)
- Moschino Men's Spring/Summer 2015 Collection Fashion Show (2014) and Men's Autumn/Winter 2015 Collection Fashion Show (2015)
- Katie Piper fundraising dinner (2014) for the Katie Piper Foundation. Attended by Simon Cowell (a patron of the foundation), Cheryl Fernandez-Versini, Louis Walsh, and Mel B
- Mary Katrantzou Autumn/Winter Collection 2015 show for London Fashion Week (2015)
- Paul Smith Fashion Show
- Coys of Kensington Classic Car Auctions
- Volkswagen Launch Event
- Used as a vaccination centre during the Covid-19 Pandemic (2021)
- The most prolific hirer of the hall since it was built is Matthew Adams who has held his monthly Adams Antiques Fairs there since May 1989

Event Type	Capacity
Cabaret	280
Banquet	480
Dinner Dance	450
Fashion Show	500
Theatre	480
Examinations	500
Reception	650

== Film and television ==
Use of Lindley Hall as a filming location include:

- BBC Question Time (TV Programme)
- Robbie Williams – Old Before I Die (Music Video)
- Audi Q5 (Advertisement)
- Harry Styles - As It Was (Music Video)
