= Edward Hawthorn =

English badminton player

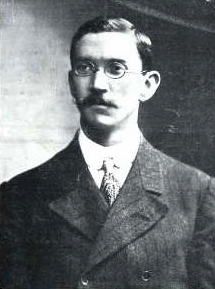

Personal information
- Born: 11 November 1878
- Died: 4 December 1951 (aged 73)

Sport
- Country: England
- Sport: Badminton

Ernest Edward Shedden Hawthorn (1878–1951) was an English international badminton player.

== Badminton career ==
Born in 1878 in Sussex he joined the Crystal Palace badminton club after becoming involved in badminton. He was a prominent player before the First World War winning two All England titles. After retiring in 1928 he became vice-president of the badminton Association and was chairman from 1936 to 1947. He died on 4 December 1951 at his home in Beckenham, Kent, at the age of 73.

He was part of the English team that toured Canada in 1925 to promote the sport on behalf of the Canadian Badminton Association which had recently been formed in 1921.

== Medal Record at the All England Badminton Championships ==
| Medal | Year | Event |
|---|---|---|
| Gold medal – first place | 1911 | Men's doubles |
| Gold medal – first place | 1912 | Mixed doubles |

== Personal life ==
He was an insurance broker by trade and lived in Beckenham, Kent.
