= Margaret Tragett =

English badminton player

Margaret Larminie Tragett
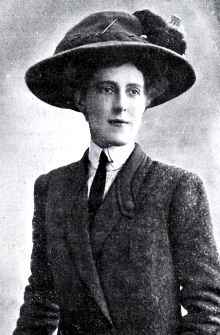

Personal information
- Born: 6 September 1885 Jamaica
- Died: 31 March 1964 (aged 78) London

Sport
- Country: England
- Sport: Badminton

Margaret Rivers Tragett (née Larminie) was a former English badminton player. She competed in the All England Championships from 1902 until 1933 and was the winner of eleven titles. She gained fifteen caps for England and was also editor of the 'Gazette' a popular badminton publication.

After marrying Robert Tragett in 1911 she competed under her married name of Margaret Tragett.

== Medal Record at the All England Badminton Championships ==
Medal	Year	Event
Gold medal – first place	1911	Women's singles
Gold medal – first place	1911	Mixed doubles
Gold medal – first place	1912	Women's singles
Gold medal – first place	1914	Women's doubles
Gold medal – first place	1922	Women's doubles
Gold medal – first place	1923	Women's doubles
Gold medal – first place	1923	Mixed doubles
Gold medal – first place	1925	Women's doubles
Gold medal – first place	1927	Women's doubles
Gold medal – first place	1928	Women's singles
Gold medal – first place	1928	Mixed doubles

== Career as a writer ==
Publishing using her maiden name Margaret Rivers Larminie, Tragett wrote a series of generally well-reviewed novels, a badminton instruction manual, and a volume of poetry with her sister Vera Larminie. On Tragett's 1925 novel, Soames Green, a chronicle of a country solicitor's family, the Sheffield Daily Telegraph's reviewer said: 'Miss Larminie is undoubtedly a Master - or should it be Mistress - of language,' although they did not consider the plot to match her skill. Tragett's 1928 novel Galatea was about the consequences of a woman named Emmeline winning an enormous amount of money in a sweepstakes, which Country Life described as ' a really distinguished and utterly charming story.' The Sketch's reviewer Alan Kemp also found Galatea agreeable but described Tragett as a 'workmanlike' novelist. Tragett's 1933 novel Doctor Sam, about a man who marries a widowed mother and becomes a good stepfather, was reviewed positively in the Western Mail: 'Miss Larminie scorns affectation and, therefore, writes with superlative ease. She is so charmingly natural that one feels her dialogue could not be otherwise than what it is.' Tragett's last novel, Gory Knight, was a parody of Dorothy L. Sayers' 1935 novel Gaudy Night.

=== Works ===
1918: [with Vera Larminie]: Out of the East: And Other Poems: Adventurers All: A Series of Young Poets Unknown to Fame [no. 17], B.H. Blackwell.

1922: Search [a novel]: London, Chatto & Windus

1923: Echo: London, Chatto & Windus

1924: Deep Meadows: London, Chatto & Windus

1925: Soames Green: London, Chatto & Windus

1926: Badminton for Beginners, etc.: London, Chatto & Windus

1928: Galatea: London, Chatto & Windus

1932: The Visiting Moon: London, John Lane

1933: Doctor Sam: London, John Lane

1937: [with Jane Langslow]: Gory Knight [a novel]: London, Longmans & Co.
