= Alice Gowenlock =

English badminton player

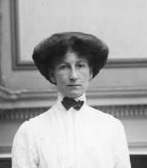

Personal information
- Born: 18 February 1878 Lambeth
- Died: 12 October 1957 (aged 79) Worthing

Sport
- Country: England
- Sport: Badminton

Alice Maud Gowenlock was an English badminton player. Born in Lambeth in 1878 she was a prominent player before the First World War and a member of the Richmond BC. She won two All England titles. and played for England just once against Ireland in 1911-12. She died in 1957 at the age of 80 in Worthing, Sussex.

== Medal Record at the All England Badminton Championships ==
Medal	Year	Event
Gold medal – first place	1911	Women's doubles
Gold medal – first place	1912	Women's doubles
