= Guy A. Sautter =

Swiss badminton player

Guy Sautter
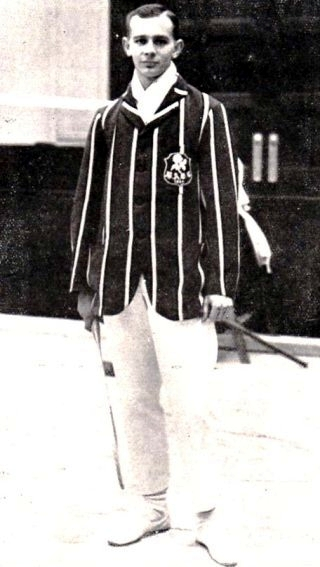

Personal information
- Born: 1886 Hyères, France
- Died: 29 October 1961 (aged 74–75) Dorset, England

Sport
- Country: Switzerland; England
- Sport: Badminton

Guy Alexandre Auguste Sautter (c.1886 – 1961) was a French born badminton player who held both Swiss and English nationality.

Sautter won the All England Open Badminton Championships, considered the unofficial World Badminton Championships, in men's singles in 1911, 1913 and 1914. In the 1913 and 1914 editions, he competed under the alias U. N. Lapin.
