= Frank Chesterton (badminton) =

English badminton player

Frank Chesterton was a male badminton player from England.

Chesterton won the men's singles at the All England Open Badminton Championships in 1909, 1910 and 1912. He was a member of the Ealing Badminton Club.

He missed many years of potential success due to World War I but did reappear at the 1920 All England Badminton Championships where he reached the men's doubles semi final with Sir George Thomas losing to eventual winners Archibald Engelbach and Raoul du Roveray 15–6, 17–15. This tournament appears to be the last he played in with no records showing further involvement in the sport.
