= Sir George Thomas, 7th Baronet =

English sports player (1881–1972)

Sir George Alan Thomas, Bt
- Full name: George Alan Thomas
- Country (sports): England; United Kingdom
- Born: 14 June 1881 Tarabya, Istanbul, Ottoman Empire
- Died: 23 July 1972 (aged 91) London, England, U.K.

Singles
- Career record: 320–156 (67.2%)
- Career titles: 26

Grand Slam singles results
- Wimbledon: QF (1911)

Doubles

Grand Slam doubles results
- Wimbledon: SF (1907, 1912)

Mixed doubles

Grand Slam mixed doubles results
- Wimbledon: 2R (1920, 1921)

Sir George Alan Thomas, 7th Baronet (14 June 1881 – 23 July 1972) was a British badminton, tennis and chess player. He was twice British chess champion and a 21-time All-England badminton champion. He also reached the quarterfinals of the singles and the semifinals of the men's tennis doubles at Wimbledon in 1911. Badminton's world men's team championships cup, equivalent to tennis' Davis Cup, is named Thomas Cup after him. Thomas lived most of his life in London and Godalming. He never married, so the hereditary Thomas baronetcy ended on his death.

== Badminton ==
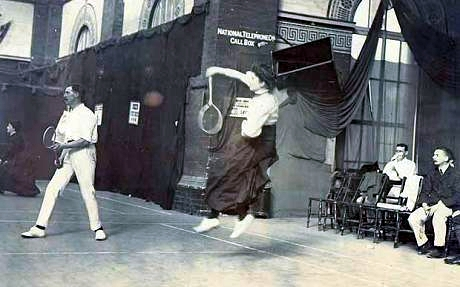
Thomas and Ethel B. Thomson playing badminton c. 1905

Counting both singles and doubles titles, Thomas is the most successful player ever in the All England Open Badminton Championships, considered the unofficial World Badminton Championships, with 21 titles from 1903 to 1928. Four of those titles were in men's singles (consecutive titles from 1920 to 1923), nine in men's doubles and eight in mixed doubles. He won his titles both before and after a hiatus in the competition from 1915 to 1919 due to World War I.

He was part of the English team that toured Canada in 1925 to promote the sport on behalf of the Canadian Badminton Association which had recently been formed in 1921. He captained the team again when a second tour was organised during 1930. A match was held at the Granite Club in Toronto which England won 7–2.

In 1934, he was co-founder of the International Badminton Federation (now Badminton World Federation), of which he was president from 1934 to 1955.

Inspired by tennis' Davis Cup, first held in 1900, and football's World Cup, first held in 1930, Thomas had the idea of organizing an international competition for country teams in badminton. In 1939 his idea was well received at the general meeting of the International Badminton Federation. In the same year, Sir George presented the Thomas Cup, officially known as The International Badminton Championship Challenge Cup, produced by Atkin Bros of London at a cost of £1700. The Cup stands 28 inches in height and 16 inches across at its widest, and consists of three parts: a plinth (pedestal), a bowl, and a lid with a player figure. The first tournament was originally planned for 1941–42, but due to World War II was not realized until 1948–49, when ten national teams participated in the first Thomas Cup competition. Despite its British origins, England's best finish in the Thomas Cup has been a third place in 1984.

Thomas was inducted into the World Badminton Hall of Fame as an Inaugural Member in 1996.

== Chess ==
George Thomas (1947)

Thomas was British Chess Champion in 1923 and 1934. He shared first prize at the 1934/5 Hastings International Chess Congress with the next world chess champion Max Euwe and leading Czechoslovak player Salo Flohr, ahead of past and future world champions José Raúl Capablanca and Mikhail Botvinnik, whom he defeated in their individual games. For Capablanca, this had been the first loss in tournament play for four years, and the first playing the white pieces for more than six years. Also in Hastings, eleven years later, Euwe would become the third world chess champion to be defeated by Thomas in a game.

His 'lifetime' scores against the world's elite were however less flattering: he had minuses against Emanuel Lasker (−1, not counting a win in a Lasker simultaneous exhibition in 1896), José Raúl Capablanca (+1−5=3), Alexander Alekhine (−7=6), Efim Bogoljubov (−5=3), Euwe (+1−9=2), Flohr (+2−9=4) and Savielly Tartakower (+3−9=10). He also fared badly against Edgard Colle (+1−9=8). Thomas made even scores with Botvinnik (+1−1), Richard Réti (+3−3=1) and Siegbert Tarrasch (+1−1=3). Against Géza Maróczy, the balance was in Thomas' favour (+3−1=5).

Domestically, he held a plus score against his great rival Frederick Yates (+13−11=13), but was less successful against Women's World Chess Champion Vera Menchik (+7−8=7),

In 1950, he was awarded the International Master title by FIDE and in 1952, became an International Arbiter. He gave up competitive chess at the age of 69.

Baronetage of Great Britain
Preceded by George Sidney Meade Thomas	Baronet (of Yapton); 1918–1972	Extinct
