= List of All England men's doubles champions =

Badminton championships

All England Open Badminton Championships Gentlemen's Doubles Champions
- Location: Birmingham; United Kingdom
- Venue: Utilita Arena Birmingham
- Governing body: NEC Group
- Created: 1899
- Editions: Total: 114; Amateur era: 69; Open era (since 1980): 45
- Prize money: $107,300 (2025)
- Trophy: Silver Challenge Trophies
- Website: allenglandbadminton.com

Most titles
- Amateur era: 9: George Alan Thomas
- Open era: 4: Park Joo-bong

Most consecutive titles
- Amateur era: 5: Finn Kobberø
- Open era: See list: 2: Kim Moon-soo; 2: Park Joo-bong (twice); 2: Li Yongbo; 2: Tian Bingyi; 2: Rexy Mainaky; 2: Ricky Subagja; 2: Marcus Fernaldi Gideon; 2: Kevin Sanjaya Sukamuljo; 2: Hiroyuki Endo; 2: Yuta Watanabe; 2: Fajar Alfian; 2: Muhammad Rian Ardianto; 2: Kim Won-ho; 2: Seo Seung-jae

Current champion
- Kim Won-ho; Seo Seung-jae – 2026 (2nd title)

The champions and runners-up of the All England Open Badminton Championships Gentlemen's Doubles tournament, first introduced to the championship in 1899. From 1915 to 1919, and from 1940 to 1946, no competition was held due to the two World Wars.

== History ==
In the Amateur era, George Alan Thomas (1906, 1908, 1910, 1912–1914, 1921, 1924, 1928) holds the record for the most titles in the Gentlemen's Doubles, winning All England nine times. Finn Kobberø holds the record for most consecutive titles with five from 1960 to 1964.

Since the Open era of badminton began in late 1979 with the inclusion of professional badminton players from around the world in 1980, Kim Moon-soo and Park Joo-bong (1985–1986), Li Yongbo and Tian Bingyi (1987–1988), Rexy Mainaky and Ricky Subagja (1995–1996), Marcus Fernaldi Gideon and Kevin Sanjaya Sukamuljo (2017–2018), Hiroyuki Endo and Yuta Watanabe (2020–2021), Fajar Alfian and Muhammad Rian Ardianto (2023–2024) share the record for most consecutive victories with just two. In fact, Park managed the feat twice with the second of his double coming in 1989–1990, achieved with different partners.

Ray Stevens, Mike Tredgett, Tjun Tjun, Johan Wahjudi and Thomas Kihlström are the only players in history to reach the All England Open Badminton Gentlemen's Doubles Final in both the Amateur and Open era. Stevens managed to so twice while partnering Tredgett who managed the feat four times, without triumphing whereas Tjun and Wahjudi managed to do so a total of six times, Kihlström twice, with all three of them winning once in the Open era.

== Finalists ==
=== Amateur era ===
| Year | Champions | Runners–up | Score |
|---|---|---|---|
| 1899 | (England) Stewart Marsden Massey (England) D. Oakes | (England) Ian M. Campbell (England) L. Hanson | 15–5, 15–7 |
| 1900 | (England) F. S. Collier (England) Herbert Mellersh | (England) Stewart Marsden Massey (England) D. Oakes | 15–12, 11–15, 15–10 |
| 1901 | (England) F. S. Collier (England) Herbert Mellersh | (England) C. H. Martin (England) Stewart Marsden Massey | 17–16, 9–15, 15–5 |
| 1902 | (England) F. S. Collier (England) Herbert Mellersh | (England) C. H. Martin (England) Stewart Marsden Massey | 5–15, 15–11, 15–9 |
| 1903 | (England) Edward Huson (England) Stewart Marsden Massey | (England) George Alan Thomas (England) Ralph Watling | 15–10, 15–3 |
| 1904 | (England) Henry Norman Marrett (England) Albert Davis Prebble | (Ireland) S. H. Dillon (Ireland) John F. Stokes | 15–8, 15–7 |
| 1905 | (England) C. T. J. Barnes (England) Stewart Marsden Massey | (England) Henry Norman Marrett (England) Albert Davis Prebble | 11–15, 15–11, 15–10 |
| 1906 | (England) Henry Norman Marrett (England) George Alan Thomas | (England) Albert Davis Prebble (England) Norman Wood | 15–5, 5–15, 15–11 |
| 1907 | (England) Norman Wood (England) Albert Davis Prebble | (England) Frank Chesterton (England) Stewart Marsden Massey | 17–16, 15–3 |
| 1908 | (England) Henry Norman Marrett (England) George Alan Thomas | (England) Frank Chesterton (England) Stewart Marsden Massey | 16–18, 18–13, 15–4 |
| 1909 | (England) Frank Chesterton (England) Albert Davis Prebble | (England) Henry Norman Marrett (England) George Alan Thomas | 15–6, 3–15, 15–7 |
| 1910 | (England) Henry Norman Marrett (England) George Alan Thomas | (England) Frank Chesterton (England) Albert Davis Prebble | 15–4, 12–15, 15–12 |
| 1911 | (England) Percy Fitton (England) Ernest Edward Hawthorn | (England) R. Franck (England) C. J. Greenwood | 8–15, 15–3, 15–10 |
| 1912 | (England) Henry Norman Marrett (England) George Alan Thomas | (England) Frank Chesterton (England) Guy A. Sautter | 15–9, 15–12 |
| 1913 | (England) Frank Chesterton (England) George Alan Thomas | (Scotland) Dr. James Crombie (Scotland) H. J. H. Inglis | 15–10, 15–8 |
| 1914 | (England) Frank Chesterton (England) George Alan Thomas | (England) Ernest Edward Hawthorn (England) U. N. Lapin (Guy A. Sautter) | 17–16, 15–7 |
| 1915–1919 | No competition | | |
| 1920 | (England) A. Fee (Archibald Engelbach) (England) Raoul du Roveray | (England) J. H. C. Prior (England) Herbert Uber | 15–13, 15–8 |
| 1921 | (England) Frank Hodge (England) George Alan Thomas | (Republic of Ireland) Frank Devlin (Republic of Ireland) Gordon Mack | 7–15, 15–8, 15–13 |
| 1922 | (Republic of Ireland) Frank Devlin (England) Guy A. Sautter | (England) Frank Hodge (England) George Alan Thomas | 15–7, 15–9 |
| 1923 | (Republic of Ireland) Frank Devlin (Republic of Ireland) Gordon Mack | (England) William Swinden (England) George Alan Thomas | 15–8, 15–13 |
| 1924 | (England) Frank Hodge (England) George Alan Thomas | (England) Arthur Kenneth Jones (England) William Swinden | 15–6, 15–8 |
| 1925 | (England) Arthur Kenneth Jones (England) Herbert Uber | (Republic of Ireland) R. A. Goff (Republic of Ireland) Gordon Mack | 15–8, 15–3 |
| 1926 | (Republic of Ireland) Frank Devlin (Republic of Ireland) Gordon Mack | (England) Raoul du Roveray (England) J. Vincent | 15–3, 15–5 |
| 1927 | (Republic of Ireland) Frank Devlin (Republic of Ireland) Gordon Mack | (England) Albert Harbot (England) Raoul du Roveray | 15–0, 7–15, 15–5 |
| 1928 | (England) Frank Hodge (England) George Alan Thomas | (England) Arthur Kenneth Jones (England) Herbert Uber | 15–9, 4–15, 15–9 |
| 1929 | (Republic of Ireland) Frank Devlin (Republic of Ireland) Gordon Mack | (England) Thomas P. Dick (England) Alan Titherley | 15–2, 15–3 |
| 1930 | (Republic of Ireland) Frank Devlin (Republic of Ireland) Gordon Mack | (England) Thomas P. Dick (England) Alan Titherley | 15–5, 15–10 |
| 1931 | (Republic of Ireland) Frank Devlin (Republic of Ireland) Gordon Mack | (England) K. G. Livingstone (England) Raymond M. White | 15–6, 11–15, 15–4 |
| 1932 | (England) Donald C. Hume (England) Raymond M. White | (England) Leslie Nichols (England) Ralph C. F. Nichols | 14–15, 18–16, 15–4 |
| 1933 | (England) Donald C. Hume (England) Raymond M. White | (Republic of Ireland) Tom Boyle (Republic of Ireland) James Rankin | |
| 1934 | (England) Donald C. Hume (England) Raymond M. White | (England) Leslie Nichols (England) Ralph C. F. Nichols | 15–12, 12–15, 15–7 |
| 1935 | (England) Donald C. Hume (England) Raymond M. White | (England) Leslie Nichols (England) Ralph C. F. Nichols | 15–12, 15–13 |
| 1936 | (England) Leslie Nichols (England) Ralph C. F. Nichols | (England) Donald C. Hume (England) Raymond M. White | 15–7, 15–2 |
| 1937 | (England) Leslie Nichols (England) Ralph C. F. Nichols | (England) Donald C. Hume (England) Raymond M. White | 15–6, 18–14 |
| 1938 | (England) Leslie Nichols (England) Ralph C. F. Nichols | (Republic of Ireland) Ian Maconachie (England) Raymond M. White | 15–12, 7–15, 15–9 |
| 1939 | (Republic of Ireland) Tom Boyle (Republic of Ireland) James Rankin | (England) Leslie Nichols (England) Ralph C. F. Nichols | 15–4, 15–3 |
| 1940–1946 | No competition | | |
| 1947 | (Denmark) Poul Holm (Denmark) Tage Madsen | (Denmark) Preben Dabelsteen (Denmark) Jørn Skaarup | 4–15, 15–12, 15–4 |
| 1948 | (Denmark) Preben Dabelsteen (Denmark) Børge Frederiksen | (Sweden) Conny Jepsen (Sweden) Nils Jonson | 15–8, 16–18, 18–17 |
| 1949 | (Malaysia) Ooi Teik Hock (Malaysia) Teoh Seng Khoon | (United States) David Freeman (United States) Wynn Rogers | 15–5, 15–6 |
| 1950 | (Denmark) Preben Dabelsteen (Denmark) Jørn Skaarup | (Denmark) Børge Frederiksen (Denmark) Poul Holm | 9–15, 15–2, 15–12 |
| 1951 | (Malaysia) David Ewe Choong (Malaysia) Eddy Choong | (Malaysia) Ismail Marjan (Malaysia) Ong Poh Lim | 9–15, 15–7, 15–10 |
| 1952 | (Malaysia) David Ewe Choong (Malaysia) Eddy Choong | (Denmark) Poul Holm (Denmark) Ole Jensen | 9–15, 15–12, 15–7 |
| 1953 | (Malaysia) David Ewe Choong (Malaysia) Eddy Choong | (Denmark) Poul Holm (Denmark) Ole Jensen | 15–5, 15–12 |
| 1954 | (Malaysia) Ong Poh Lim (Malaysia) Ooi Teik Hock | (Malaysia) David Ewe Choong (Malaysia) Eddy Choong | 18–16, 15–12 |
| 1955 | (Denmark) Jørgen Hammergaard Hansen (Denmark) Finn Kobberø | (Malaysia) David Ewe Choong (Malaysia) Eddy Choong | 15–9, 14–17, 15–11 |
| 1956 | (Denmark) Jørgen Hammergaard Hansen (Denmark) Finn Kobberø | (Denmark) Poul Erik Nielsen (Denmark) John Nygaard | 18–14, 15–5 |
| 1957 | (United States) Joseph C. Alston (Malaysia) Heah Hock Aun | (Malaysia) David Ewe Choong (Malaysia) Eddy Choong | 15–10, 16–17, 15–5 |
| 1958 | (Denmark) Erland Kops (Denmark) Poul Erik Nielsen | (Denmark) Jørgen Hammergaard Hansen (Denmark) Finn Kobberø | 15–7, 11–15, 15–8 |
| 1959 | (Malaysia) Lim Say Hup (Malaysia) Teh Kew San | (Denmark) Henning Borch (Denmark) Jørgen Hammergaard Hansen | 15–12, 15–10 |
| 1960 | (Denmark) Poul Erik Nielsen (Denmark) Finn Kobberø | (Malaysia) Lim Say Hup (Malaysia) Teh Kew San | 14–17, 15–3, 15–1 |
| 1961 | (Denmark) Jørgen Hammergaard Hansen (Denmark) Finn Kobberø | (Denmark) Erland Kops (Denmark) Poul Erik Nielsen | 15–6, 15–5 |
| 1962 | (Denmark) Jørgen Hammergaard Hansen (Denmark) Finn Kobberø | (Thailand) Narong Bhornchima (Thailand) Raphi Kanchanaraphi | 17–16, 15–3 |
| 1963 | (Denmark) Jørgen Hammergaard Hansen (Denmark) Finn Kobberø | (Indonesia) Ferry Sonneville (Indonesia) Tan Joe Hok | 10–15, 15–4, 15–7 |
| 1964 | (Denmark) Jørgen Hammergaard Hansen (Denmark) Finn Kobberø | (Denmark) Erland Kops (Denmark) Poul Erik Nielsen | 9–15, 15–9, 17–15 |
| 1965 | (Malaysia) Ng Boon Bee (Malaysia) Tan Yee Khan | (Denmark) Erland Kops (Malaysia) Oon Chong Jin | 15–7, 15–5 |
| 1966 | (Malaysia) Ng Boon Bee (Malaysia) Tan Yee Khan | (Denmark) Finn Kobberø (Denmark) Jørgen Hammergaard Hansen | 9–15, 15–9, 17–15 |
| 1967 | (Denmark) Henning Borch (Denmark) Erland Kops | (Denmark) Svend Pri (Denmark) Per Walsøe | 15–8, 15–12 |
| 1968 | (Denmark) Henning Borch (Denmark) Erland Kops | (Malaysia) Ng Boon Bee (Malaysia) Tan Yee Khan | 15–6, 15–4 |
| 1969 | (Denmark) Henning Borch (Denmark) Erland Kops | (England) David Eddy (England) Roger A. Powell | 13–15, 15–10, 15–9 |
| 1970 | (Denmark) Tom Bacher (Denmark) Poul Petersen | (England) David Eddy (England) Roger A. Powell | 15–11, 15–0 |
| 1971 | (Malaysia) Ng Boon Bee (Malaysia) Punch Gunalan | (Indonesia) Indra Gunawan (Indonesia) Rudy Hartono | 15–5, 15–3 |
| 1972 | (Indonesia) Ade Chandra (Indonesia) Christian Hadinata | (England) Ray Stevens (England) Mike Tredgett | 15–5, 15–12 |
| 1973 | (Indonesia) Ade Chandra (Indonesia) Christian Hadinata | (Indonesia) Tjun Tjun (Indonesia) Johan Wahjudi | 15–1, 15–7 |
| 1974 | (Indonesia) Tjun Tjun (Indonesia) Johan Wahjudi | (Indonesia) Ade Chandra (Indonesia) Christian Hadinata | 15–8, 15–6 |
| 1975 | (Indonesia) Tjun Tjun (Indonesia) Johan Wahjudi | (Indonesia) Ade Chandra (Indonesia) Christian Hadinata | 15–11, 15–5 |
| 1976 | (Sweden) Bengt Froman (Sweden) Thomas Kihlström | (Denmark) Svend Pri (Denmark) Steen Skovgaard | 15–12, 17–15 |
| 1977 | (Indonesia) Tjun Tjun (Indonesia) Johan Wahjudi | (Indonesia) Ade Chandra (Indonesia) Christian Hadinata | 15–7, 18–15 |
| 1978 | (Indonesia) Tjun Tjun (Indonesia) Johan Wahjudi | (Indonesia) Ade Chandra (Indonesia) Christian Hadinata | 15–12, 15–8 |
| 1979 | (Indonesia) Tjun Tjun (Indonesia) Johan Wahjudi | (Sweden) Stefan Karlsson (Sweden) Claes Nordin | 17–16, 15–3 |

=== Open era ===
| Year | Country | Champions | Country | Runners–up | Score |
|---|---|---|---|---|---|
| 1980 | INA; INA | Tjun Tjun; Johan Wahjudi | ENG; ENG | Ray Stevens; Mike Tredgett | 10–15, 15–9, 15–10 |
| 1981 | INA; INA | Rudy Heryanto; Hariamanto Kartono | INA; INA | Tjun Tjun; Johan Wahjudi | 15–9, 15–8 |
| 1982 | MAS; MAS | Jalani Sidek; Razif Sidek | SCO; SCO | Billy Gilliland; Dan Travers | 8–15, 15–9, 15–10 |
| 1983 | SWE; SWE | Stefan Karlsson; Thomas Kihlström | ENG; ENG | Martin Dew; Mike Tredgett | 15–10, 15–13 |
| 1984 | INA; INA | Rudy Heryanto; Hariamanto Kartono | ENG; ENG | Martin Dew; Mike Tredgett | 15–11, 15–6 |
| 1985 | KOR; KOR | Kim Moon-soo; Park Joo-bong | DEN; DEN | Mark Christiansen; Michael Kjeldsen | 7–15, 15–10, 15–9 |
| 1986 | KOR; KOR | Kim Moon–soo; Park Joo-bong | MAS; MAS | Jalani Sidek; Razif Sidek | 15–2, 15–11 |
| 1987 | CHN; CHN | Li Yongbo; Tian Bingyi | INA; INA | Bobby Ertanto; Rudy Heryanto | 15–9, 15–8 |
| 1988 | CHN; CHN | Li Yongbo; Tian Bingyi | MAS; MAS | Jalani Sidek; Razif Sidek | 15–6, 15–7 |
| 1989 | KOR; KOR | Lee Sang-bok; Park Joo-bong | INA; INA | Rudy Gunawan; Eddy Hartono | 15–8, 15–7 |
| 1990 | KOR; KOR | Kim Moon-soo; Park Joo-bong | CHN; CHN | Li Yongbo; Tian Bingyi | 17–14, 15–9 |
| 1991 | CHN; CHN | Li Yongbo; Tian Bingyi | KOR; KOR | Kim Moon-soo; Park Joo-bong | 12–15, 15–7, 15–8 |
| 1992 | INA; INA | Rudy Gunawan; Eddy Hartono | DEN; DEN | Jan Paulsen; Henrik Svarrer | 15–10, 15–12 |
| 1993 | DEN; DEN | Jon Holst-Christensen; Thomas Lund | CHN; CHN | Chen Hongyong; Chen Kang | 10–15, 15–2, 15–10 |
| 1994 | INA; INA | Rudy Gunawan; Bambang Suprianto | INA; INA | Rexy Mainaky; Ricky Subagja | 15–12, 15–12 |
| 1995 | INA; INA | Rexy Mainaky; Ricky Subagja | INA; INA | Antonius Budi Ariantho; Denny Kantono | 15–12, 15–18, 15–8 |
| 1996 | INA; INA | Rexy Mainaky; Ricky Subagja | MAS; MAS | Cheah Soon Kit; Yap Kim Hock | 15–6, 15–5 |
| 1997 | KOR; KOR | Ha Tae-kwon; Kang Kyung-jin | DEN; DEN | Jon Holst-Christensen; Michael Søgaard | 15–11, 17–16 |
| 1998 | KOR; KOR | Lee Dong-soo; Yoo Yong-sung | INA; INA | Tony Gunawan; Candra Wijaya | 15–10, 15–10 |
| 1999 | INA; INA | Tony Gunawan; Candra Wijaya | KOR; KOR | Lee Dong-soo; Yoo Yong-sung | 15–7, 15–5 |
| 2000 | KOR; KOR | Ha Tae-kwon; Kim Dong-moon | KOR; KOR | Lee Dong-soo; Yoo Yong-sung | 15–4, 13–15, 17–15 |
| 2001 | INA; INA | Tony Gunawan; Halim Heryanto | INA; INA | Sigit Budiarto; Candra Wijaya | 15–13, 7–15, 15–7 |
| 2002 | KOR; KOR | Ha Tae-kwon; Kim Dong-moon | INA; INA | Eng Hian; Flandy Limpele | 7–2, 7–2, 1–7, 7–3 |
| 2003 | INA; INA | Sigit Budiarto; Candra Wijaya | KOR; KOR | Lee Dong-soo; Yoo Yong-sung | 15–5, 15–7 |
| 2004 | DEN; DEN | Jens Eriksen; Martin Lundgaard Hansen | MAS; MAS | Choong Tan Fook; Lee Wan Wah | 9–15, 15–13, 15–3 |
| 2005 | CHN; CHN | Cai Yun; Fu Haifeng | DEN; DEN | Lars Paaske; Jonas Rasmussen | 15–10, 15–6 |
| 2006 | DEN; DEN | Jens Eriksen; Martin Lundgaard Hansen | MAS; MAS | Choong Tan Fook; Lee Wan Wah | 17–15, 14–17, 15–2 |
| 2007 | MAS; MAS | Koo Kien Keat; Tan Boon Heong | CHN; CHN | Cai Yun; Fu Haifeng | 21–15, 21–18 |
| 2008 | KOR; KOR | Jung Jae-sung; Lee Yong-dae | KOR; KOR | Hwang Ji-man; Lee Jae-jin | 20–22, 21–19, 21–18 |
| 2009 | CHN; CHN | Cai Yun; Fu Haifeng | KOR; KOR | Han Sang-hoon; Hwang Ji-man | 21–17, 21–15 |
| 2010 | DEN; DEN | Lars Paaske; Jonas Rasmussen | DEN; DEN | Mathias Boe; Carsten Mogensen | 21–23, 21–19, 26–24 |
| 2011 | DEN; DEN | Mathias Boe; Carsten Mogensen | MAS; MAS | Koo Kien Keat; Tan Boon Heong | 15–21, 21–18, 21–18 |
| 2012 | KOR; KOR | Jung Jae-sung; Lee Yong-dae | CHN; CHN | Cai Yun; Fu Haifeng | 21–23, 21–9, 21–14 |
| 2013 | CHN; CHN | Liu Xiaolong; Qiu Zihan | JPN; JPN | Hiroyuki Endo; Kenichi Hayakawa | 21–11, 21–9 |
| 2014 | INA; INA | Mohammad Ahsan; Hendra Setiawan | JPN; JPN | Hiroyuki Endo; Kenichi Hayakawa | 21–19, 21–19 |
| 2015 | DEN; DEN | Mathias Boe; Carsten Mogensen | CHN; CHN | Fu Haifeng; Zhang Nan | 21–17, 22–20 |
| 2016 | RUS; RUS | Vladimir Ivanov; Ivan Sozonov | JPN; JPN | Hiroyuki Endo; Kenichi Hayakawa | 21–23, 21–18, 21–16 |
| 2017 | INA; INA | Marcus Fernaldi Gideon; Kevin Sanjaya Sukamuljo | CHN; CHN | Li Junhui; Liu Yuchen | 21–19, 21–14 |
| 2018 | INA; INA | Marcus Fernaldi Gideon; Kevin Sanjaya Sukamuljo | DEN; DEN | Mathias Boe; Carsten Mogensen | 21–18, 21–17 |
| 2019 | INA; INA | Mohammad Ahsan; Hendra Setiawan | MAS; MAS | Aaron Chia; Soh Wooi Yik | 11–21, 21–14, 21–12 |
| 2020 | JPN; JPN | Hiroyuki Endo; Yuta Watanabe | INA; INA | Marcus Fernaldi Gideon; Kevin Sanjaya Sukamuljo | 21–18, 12–21, 21–19 |
| 2021 | JPN; JPN | Hiroyuki Endo; Yuta Watanabe | JPN; JPN | Takeshi Kamura; Keigo Sonoda | 21–15, 17–21, 21–11 |
| 2022 | INA; INA | Muhammad Shohibul Fikri; Bagas Maulana | INA; INA | Mohammad Ahsan; Hendra Setiawan | 21–19, 21–13 |
| 2023 | INA; INA | Fajar Alfian; Muhammad Rian Ardianto | INA; INA | Mohammad Ahsan; Hendra Setiawan | 21–17, 21–14 |
| 2024 | INA; INA | Fajar Alfian; Muhammad Rian Ardianto | MAS; MAS | Aaron Chia; Soh Wooi Yik | 21–16, 21–16 |
| 2025 | KOR; KOR | Kim Won-ho; Seo Seung-jae | INA; INA | Leo Rolly Carnando; Bagas Maulana | 21–19, 21–19 |
| 2026 | KOR; KOR | Kim Won-ho; Seo Seung-jae | MAS; MAS | Aaron Chia; Soh Wooi Yik | 18–21, 21–12, 21–19 |

== Statistics ==
=== Multiple titles ===
Bold indicates active players.

| Rank | Country | Player | Amateur era | Open era | All-time | Years |
|---|---|---|---|---|---|---|
| 1 | ENG | George Alan Thomas | 9 | 0 | 9 | 1906, 1908, 1910, 1912, 1913, 1914, 1921, 1924, 1928 |
| 2 | IRL | Frank Devlin | 7 | 0 | 7 | 1922, 1923, 1926, 1927, 1929, 1930, 1931 |
| 2 | DEN | Finn Kobberø | 7 | 0 | 7 | 1955, 1956, 1960, 1961, 1962, 1963, 1964 |
| 4 | IRL | Gordon Mack | 6 | 0 | 6 | 1922, 1926, 1927, 1929, 1930, 1931 |
| 4 | DEN | Jørgen Hammergaard Hansen | 6 | 0 | 6 | 1955, 1956, 1961, 1962, 1963, 1964 |
| 4 | INA | Tjun Tjun | 5 | 1 | 6 | 1974, 1975, 1977, 1978, 1979, 1980 |
| 4 | INA | Johan Wahjudi | 5 | 1 | 6 | 1974, 1975, 1977, 1978, 1979, 1980 |
| 8 | ENG | Henry Norman Marrett | 5 | 0 | 5 | 1904, 1906, 1908, 1910, 1912 |
| 9 | ENG | Donald C. Hume | 4 | 0 | 4 | 1932, 1933, 1934, 1935 |
| 9 | ENG | Raymond M. White | 4 | 0 | 4 | 1932, 1933, 1934, 1935 |
| 9 | DEN | Erland Kops | 4 | 0 | 4 | 1958, 1967, 1968, 1969 |
| 9 | KOR | Joo-bong Park | 0 | 4 | 4 | 1985, 1986, 1989, 1990 |
| 13 | ENG | Stewart Massey | 3 | 0 | 3 | 1899, 1903, 1905 |
| 13 | ENG | F. S. Collier | 3 | 0 | 3 | 1900, 1901, 1902 |
| 13 | ENG | Herbert Mellersh | 3 | 0 | 3 | 1900, 1901, 1902 |
| 13 | ENG | Albert Prebble | 3 | 0 | 3 | 1904, 1907, 1909 |
| 13 | ENG | Frank Chesterton | 3 | 0 | 3 | 1909, 1913, 1914 |
| 13 | ENG | Frank Hodge | 3 | 0 | 3 | 1921, 1924, 1928 |
| 13 | ENG | Leslie Nichols | 3 | 0 | 3 | 1936, 1937, 1938 |
| 13 | ENG | Ralph C. F. Nichols | 3 | 0 | 3 | 1936, 1937, 1938 |
| 13 | MAS | David Ewe Leong Choong | 3 | 0 | 3 | 1951, 1952, 1953 |
| 13 | MAS | Eddy Ewe Beng Choong | 3 | 0 | 3 | 1951, 1952, 1953 |
| 13 | MAS | Boon Bee Ng | 3 | 0 | 3 | 1965, 1966, 1971 |
| 13 | DEN | Henning Borch | 3 | 0 | 3 | 1967, 1968, 1969 |
| 13 | KOR | Moon-soo Kim | 0 | 3 | 3 | 1985, 1986, 1990 |
| 13 | CHN | Yongbo Li | 0 | 3 | 3 | 1987, 1988, 1991 |
| 13 | CHN | Bingyi Tian | 0 | 3 | 3 | 1987, 1988, 1991 |
| 13 | KOR | Tae-kwon Ha | 0 | 3 | 3 | 1997, 2000, 2002 |
| 29 | DEN | Preben Dabelsteen | 2 | 0 | 2 | 1948, 1950 |
| 29 | MAS | Teik Hock Ooi | 2 | 0 | 2 | 1949, 1954 |
| 29 | DEN | Poul Erik Nielsen | 2 | 0 | 2 | 1958, 1960 |
| 29 | MAS | Yee Khan Tan | 2 | 0 | 2 | 1965, 1966 |
| 29 | INA | Ade Chandra | 2 | 0 | 2 | 1972, 1973 |
| 29 | INA | Christian Hadinata | 2 | 0 | 2 | 1972, 1973 |
| 29 | SWE | Thomas Kihlström | 1 | 1 | 2 | 1976, 1983 |
| 29 | INA | Rudy Heryanto | 0 | 2 | 2 | 1981, 1984 |
| 29 | INA | Hariamanto Kartono | 0 | 2 | 2 | 1981, 1984 |
| 29 | INA | Rudy Gunawan | 0 | 2 | 2 | 1992, 1994 |
| 29 | INA | Rexy Mainaky | 0 | 2 | 2 | 1995, 1996 |
| 29 | INA | Ricky Subagja | 0 | 2 | 2 | 1995, 1996 |
| 29 | INA | Tony Gunawan | 0 | 2 | 2 | 1999, 2001 |
| 29 | INA | Candra Wijaya | 0 | 2 | 2 | 1999, 2003 |
| 29 | KOR | Dong-moon Kim | 0 | 2 | 2 | 2000, 2002 |
| 29 | DEN | Jens Eriksen | 0 | 2 | 2 | 2004, 2006 |
| 29 | DEN | Martin Lundgaard Hansen | 0 | 2 | 2 | 2004, 2006 |
| 29 | CHN | Yun Cai | 0 | 2 | 2 | 2005, 2009 |
| 29 | CHN | Haifeng Fu | 0 | 2 | 2 | 2005, 2009 |
| 29 | KOR | Jae-sung Jung | 0 | 2 | 2 | 2008, 2012 |
| 29 | KOR | Yong-dae Lee | 0 | 2 | 2 | 2008, 2012 |
| 29 | DEN | Mathias Boe | 0 | 2 | 2 | 2011, 2015 |
| 29 | DEN | Carsten Mogensen | 0 | 2 | 2 | 2011, 2015 |
| 29 | INA | Mohammad Ahsan | 0 | 2 | 2 | 2014, 2019 |
| 29 | INA | Hendra Setiawan | 0 | 2 | 2 | 2014, 2019 |
| 29 | INA | Marcus Fernaldi Gideon | 0 | 2 | 2 | 2017, 2018 |
| 29 | INA | Kevin Sanjaya Sukamuljo | 0 | 2 | 2 | 2017, 2018 |
| 29 | JPN | Hiroyuki Endo | 0 | 2 | 2 | 2020, 2021 |
| 29 | JPN | **Yuta Watanabe** | 0 | 2 | 2 | 2020, 2021 |
| 29 | INA | **Fajar Alfian** | 0 | 2 | 2 | 2023, 2024 |
| 29 | INA | **Muhammad Rian Ardianto** | 0 | 2 | 2 | 2023, 2024 |
| 29 | KOR | **Won-ho Kim** | 0 | 2 | 2 | 2025, 2026 |
| 29 | KOR | **Seung-jae Seo** | 0 | 2 | 2 | 2025, 2026 |

=== Champions by country ===
| Rank | Country | Amateur era | Open era | All-time | First title | Last title | First champions | Last champions |
|---|---|---|---|---|---|---|---|---|
| 1 | England (ENG) | 28.5 | 0 | 28.5 | 1899 | 1938 | Stewart Massey; D. Oakes | Leslie Nichols; Ralph C. F. Nichols |
| 2 | Indonesia (INA) | 7 | 17 | 24 | 1972 | 2024 | Ade Chandra; Christian Hadinata | Fajar Alfian; Muhammad Rian Ardianto |
| 3 | Denmark (DEN) | 15 | 6 | 21 | 1947 | 2015 | Poul Holm; Tage Madsen | Mathias Boe; Carsten Mogensen |
| 4 | Malaysia (MAS) | 9.5 | 2 | 11.5 | 1949 | 2007 | Teik Hock Ooi; Seng Khoon Teoh | Kien Keat Koo; Boon Heong Tan |
| 5 | South Korea (KOR) | 0 | 11 | 11 | 1985 | 2025 | Moon-soo Kim; Joo-bong Park | Won-ho Kim; Seung-jae Seo |
| 6 | Ireland (IRL) | 7.5 | 0 | 7.5 | 1922 | 1939 | Frank Devlin (England) Guy A. Sautter | Tom Boyle; James Rankin |
| 7 | China (CHN) | 0 | 6 | 6 | 1987 | 2013 | Yongbo Li; Bingyi Tian | Xiaolong Liu; Zihan Qiu |
| 8 | Sweden (SWE) | 1 | 1 | 2 | 1976 | 1983 | Bengt Froman; Thomas Kihlström | Stefan Karlsson; Thomas Kihlström |
| 8 | Japan (JPN) | 0 | 2 | 2 | 2020 | 2021 | Hiroyuki Endo; Yuta Watanabe | |
| 10 | Russia (RUS) | 0 | 1 | 1 | 2016 | | Vladimir Ivanov; Ivan Sozonov | |
| 11 | United States (USA) | 0.5 | 0 | 0.5 | 1957 | | Joseph C. Alston (Malaysia) Hock Aun Heah | |

=== Multiple finalists ===
Bold indicates active players.
Italic indicates players who never won the championship.

| Rank | Country | Player | Amateur era | Open era | All-time |
|---|---|---|---|---|---|
| 1 | ENG | George Alan Thomas | 13 | 0 | 13 |
| 2 | DEN | Jørgen Hammergaard Hansen | 9 | 0 | 9 |
| 2 | DEN | Finn Kobberø | 9 | 0 | 9 |
| 4 | ENG | Stewart Marsden Massey | 8 | 0 | 8 |
| 4 | IRL | Frank Devlin | 8 | 0 | 8 |
| 4 | IRL | Gordon Mack | 8 | 0 | 8 |
| 4 | ENG | Raymond M. White | 8 | 0 | 8 |
| 4 | INA | Tjun Tjun | 6 | 2 | 8 |
| 4 | INA | Johan Wahjudi | 6 | 2 | 8 |
| 10 | ENG | Henry Norman Marrett | 7 | 0 | 7 |
| 10 | ENG | Frank Chesterton | 7 | 0 | 7 |
| 10 | ENG | Leslie Nichols | 7 | 0 | 7 |
| 10 | ENG | Ralph C. F. Nichols | 7 | 0 | 7 |
| 10 | DEN | Erland Kops | 7 | 0 | 7 |
| 15 | ENG | Albert Davis Prebble | 6 | 0 | 6 |
| 15 | ENG | Donald C. Hume | 6 | 0 | 6 |
| 15 | MAS | David Ewe Choong | 6 | 0 | 6 |
| 15 | MAS | Eddy Choong | 6 | 0 | 6 |
| 15 | INA | Ade Chandra | 6 | 0 | 6 |
| 15 | INA | Christian Hadinata | 6 | 0 | 6 |
| 21 | DEN | Poul Erik Nielsen | 5 | 0 | 5 |
| 21 | KOR | Joo-bong Park | 0 | 5 | 5 |
| 21 | CHN | Haifeng Fu | 0 | 5 | 5 |
| 21 | JPN | Hiroyuki Endo | 0 | 5 | 5 |
| 25 | ENG | Frank Hodge | 4 | 0 | 4 |
| 25 | DEN | Poul Holm | 4 | 0 | 4 |
| 25 | MAS | Boon Bee Ng | 4 | 0 | 4 |
| 25 | DEN | Henning Borch | 4 | 0 | 4 |
| 25 | CHN | Yongbo Li | 0 | 4 | 4 |
| 25 | CHN | Bingyi Tian | 0 | 4 | 4 |
| 25 | KOR | Dong-soo Lee | 0 | 4 | 4 |
| 25 | KOR | Yong-sung Yoo | 0 | 4 | 4 |
| 25 | INA | Candra Wijaya | 0 | 4 | 4 |
| 25 | CHN | Yun Cai | 0 | 4 | 4 |
| 25 | DEN | Mathias Boe | 0 | 4 | 4 |
| 25 | DEN | Carsten Mogensen | 0 | 4 | 4 |
| 25 | INA | Mohammad Ahsan | 0 | 4 | 4 |
| 25 | INA | Hendra Setiawan | 0 | 4 | 4 |
| 25 | ENG | Mike Tredgett | 1 | 3 | 4 |
| 40 | ENG | F. S. Collier | 3 | 0 | 3 |
| 40 | ENG | Herbert Mellersh | 3 | 0 | 3 |
| 40 | ENG | Raoul du Roveray | 3 | 0 | 3 |
| 40 | ENG | Arthur Kenneth Jones | 3 | 0 | 3 |
| 40 | ENG | Herbert Uber | 3 | 0 | 3 |
| 40 | DEN | Preben Dabelsteen | 3 | 0 | 3 |
| 40 | MAS | Yee Khan Tan | 3 | 0 | 3 |
| 40 | ENG | Guy A. Sautter | 3 | 0 | 3 |
| 40 | INA | Rudy Heryanto | 0 | 3 | 3 |
| 40 | MAS | Jalani Sidek | 0 | 3 | 3 |
| 40 | MAS | Razif Sidek | 0 | 3 | 3 |
| 40 | KOR | Moon-soo Kim | 0 | 3 | 3 |
| 40 | INA | Rudy Gunawan | 0 | 3 | 3 |
| 40 | INA | Rexy Mainaky | 0 | 3 | 3 |
| 40 | INA | Ricky Subagja | 0 | 3 | 3 |
| 40 | KOR | Tae-kwon Ha | 0 | 3 | 3 |
| 40 | INA | Tony Gunawan | 0 | 3 | 3 |
| 40 | INA | Marcus Fernaldi Gideon | 0 | 3 | 3 |
| 40 | INA | Kevin Sanjaya Sukamuljo | 0 | 3 | 3 |
| 40 | JPN | Kenichi Hayakawa | 0 | 3 | 3 |
| 60 | ENG | D. Oakes | 2 | 0 | 2 |
| 60 | ENG | Norman Wood | 2 | 0 | 2 |
| 60 | ENG | Ernest Edward Hawthorn | 2 | 0 | 2 |
| 60 | IRL | Tom Boyle | 2 | 0 | 2 |
| 60 | IRL | James Rankin | 2 | 0 | 2 |
| 60 | DEN | Børge Frederiksen | 2 | 0 | 2 |
| 60 | MAS | Teik Hock Ooi | 2 | 0 | 2 |
| 60 | DEN | Jørn Skaarup | 2 | 0 | 2 |
| 60 | MAS | Poh Lim Ong | 2 | 0 | 2 |
| 60 | MAS | Say Hup Lim | 2 | 0 | 2 |
| 60 | MAS | Kew San Teh | 2 | 0 | 2 |
| 60 | SWE | Thomas Kihlström | 1 | 1 | 2 |
| 60 | SWE | Stefan Karlsson | 1 | 1 | 2 |
| 60 | INA | Hariamanto Kartono | 0 | 2 | 2 |
| 60 | INA | Eddy Hartono | 0 | 2 | 2 |
| 60 | DEN | Jon Holst-Christensen | 0 | 2 | 2 |
| 60 | KOR | Dong-moon Kim | 0 | 2 | 2 |
| 60 | INA | Sigit Budiarto | 0 | 2 | 2 |
| 60 | DEN | Jens Eriksen | 0 | 2 | 2 |
| 60 | DEN | Martin Lundgaard Hansen | 0 | 2 | 2 |
| 60 | MAS | Kien Keat Koo | 0 | 2 | 2 |
| 60 | MAS | Boon Heong Tan | 0 | 2 | 2 |
| 60 | KOR | Jae-sung Jung | 0 | 2 | 2 |
| 60 | KOR | Yong-dae Lee | 0 | 2 | 2 |
| 60 | DEN | Lars Paaske | 0 | 2 | 2 |
| 60 | DEN | Jonas Rasmussen | 0 | 2 | 2 |
| 60 | JPN | **Yuta Watanabe** | 0 | 2 | 2 |
| 60 | INA | **Fajar Alfian** | 0 | 2 | 2 |
| 60 | INA | **Muhammad Rian Ardianto** | 0 | 2 | 2 |
| 60 | ENG | C. H. Martin | 2 | 0 | 2 |
| 60 | ENG | William Swinden | 2 | 0 | 2 |
| 60 | ENG | Thomas P. Dick | 2 | 0 | 2 |
| 60 | ENG | Alan Titherley | 2 | 0 | 2 |
| 60 | DEN | Ole Jensen | 2 | 0 | 2 |
| 60 | DEN | Svend Pri | 2 | 0 | 2 |
| 60 | ENG | David Eddy | 2 | 0 | 2 |
| 60 | ENG | Roger A. Powell | 2 | 0 | 2 |
| 60 | INA | Ray Stevens | 1 | 1 | 2 |
| 60 | ENG | Martin Dew | 0 | 2 | 2 |
| 60 | MAS | Tan Fook Choong | 0 | 2 | 2 |
| 60 | MAS | Wan Wah Lee | 0 | 2 | 2 |
| 60 | KOR | Ji-man Hwang | 0 | 2 | 2 |
| 60 | MAS | **Aaron Chia** | 0 | 2 | 2 |
| 60 | MAS | **Wooi Yik Soh** | 0 | 2 | 2 |
| 60 | INA | **Bagas Maulana** | 0 | 2 | 2 |

== Trivia ==
- In 1914 Guy A. Sautter played under the alias U. N. Lapin.
- In 1920 Archibald Englebach played under the alias A. Fee.
- The most back-to-back finals ever reached in men's doubles was achieved by Raymond M. White when he reached 8 consecutive finals between 1931 and 1938, a record he holds till this day:

| Rank | Country | Player | Back–to–back finals | Period |
|---|---|---|---|---|
| 1 | ENG | Raymond M. White | 8 | 1931–1938 |
| 2 | ENG | Donald C. Hume | 6 | 1932–1937 |
| 2 | ENG | Leslie Nichols | 6 | 1934–1939 |
| 2 | ENG | Ralph C. F. Nichols | 6 | 1934–1939 |
| 5 | ENG | Stewart Massey | 5 | 1899–1903 |
| 5 | MAS | David Ewe Leong Choong | 5 | 1951–1955 |
| 5 | MAS | Eddy Ewe Beng Choong | 5 | 1951–1955 |
| 5 | DEN | Finn Kobberø | 5 | 1960–1964 |
| 5 | INA | Tjun Tjun | 5 | 1977–1981 |
| 5 | INA | Johan Wahjudi | 5 | 1977–1981 |
| 11 | ENG | Frank Chesterton | 4 | 1907–1910 |
| 11 | ENG | George Alan Thomas | 4 | 1921–1924 |
| 11 | DEN | Jørgen Hammergaard Hansen | 4 | 1961–1964 |
| 11 | INA | Ade Chandra | 4 | 1972–1975 |
| 11 | INA | Christian Hadinata | 4 | 1972–1975 |
| 16 | ENG | F. S. Collier | 3 | 1900–1902 |
| 16 | ENG | Herbert Mellersh | 3 | 1900–1902 |
| 16 | ENG | Henry Norman Marrett | 3 | 1904–1907; 1908–1910 |
| 16 | ENG | Albert Prebble | 3 | 1905–1907 |
| 16 | ENG | George Alan Thomas | 3 | 1908–1910; 1912–1914 |
| 16 | ENG | Frank Chesterton | 3 | 1912–1914 |
| 16 | IRL | Frank Devlin | 3 | 1921–1923; 1929–1931 |
| 16 | IRL | Gordon Mack | 3 | 1925–1927; 1929–1931 |
| 16 | DEN | Henning Borch | 3 | 1967–1969 |
| 16 | DEN | Erland Kops | 3 | 1967–1969 |
| 16 | INA | Tjun Tjun | 3 | 1973–1975 |
| 16 | INA | Johan Wahjudi | 3 | 1973–1975 |
| 16 | KOR | Joo-bong Park | 3 | 1989–1991 |
| 16 | INA | Rexy Mainaky | 3 | 1994–1996 |
| 16 | INA | Ricky Subagja | 3 | 1994–1996 |
| 16 | KOR | Dong-soo Lee | 3 | 1998–2000 |
| 16 | KOR | Yong-sung Yoo | 3 | 1998–2000 |

== See also ==
- List of All England men's singles champions
- List of All England women's singles champions
- List of All England women's doubles champions
- List of All England mixed doubles champions
