= 1923 All England Badminton Championships =

1923 All England Open Badminton Championships
Tournament details
- Dates: 6 March 1923– 11 March 1923
- Edition: 20th
- Venue: Royal Horticultural Hall
- Location: Elverton Street, Westminster, London
- Official website: All England Championships

The 1923 All England Championships was a badminton tournament held at the Royal Horticultural Hall, Westminster, England from 6 March to 11 March 1923.

Sir George Thomas won his fourth consecutive men's singles title. Lavinia Radeglia won the women's singles.

== Final results ==
Category	Winners	Runners-up	Score
Men's singles	(England) Sir George Thomas	(England) Herbert Uber	15–10, 15-10
Women's singles	(England) Lavinia Radeglia	(England) Marian Horsley	11–8, 11-6
Men's doubles	(Republic of Ireland) Frank Devlin & Curly Mack	(England) Sir George Thomas & William Swinden	15–8, 15–13
Women's doubles	(England) Hazel Hogarth & Margaret Tragett	(England) Violet Elton & Lavinia Radeglia	15-3, 18–15
Mixed doubles	(Republic of Ireland) Curly Mack & (England) Margaret Tragett	(England) Sir George Thomas & Hazel Hogarth	15-10, 15-7

== Men's singles ==
Second round
(England) Sir George Thomas	15	15
(Republic of Ireland) Curly Mack	8	8
(England) Carolus St Ruth	w/o
(England) Francis Wheler
(Republic of Ireland) Frank Devlin	15	15
(England) M Rothwell-Jackson	2	10
(India) Hassan Ali Fyzee	15	15
(England) K S Chan+	4	5
(England) Herbert Uber	18	15
(England) Thomas Dick	15	7
(England) H Smith	15	15
(England) Arthur Andrews	0	12
(England) Henry Martin	15	15
(England) A Bachmann	1	1
(England) William Swinden	15	15
(England) G Greville	7	3

Quarterfinals
(England) Thomas	15	15
(England) St Ruth	1	3
(Republic of Ireland) Devlin	15	15
(India) Fyzee	1	9
(England) Uber	15	2	15
(England) Smith	9	15	9
(England) Martin	12	15	15
(England) Swinden	15	6	7

Semifinals
(England) Thomas	15	11	15
(Republic of Ireland) Devlin	10	15	0
(England) Uber	15	1	15
(England) Martin	9	15	9

Final
(England) Thomas	15	15
(England) Uber	10	10

+ alias

== Women's singles ==
Second round
(England) Lavinia Radeglia	9	11	11
(England) Marguerite Snaith	11	3	5
(England) Margaret Tragett	11	11
(England) W B Rowe	3	4
(England) G Jackson	11	11
(England) M E Templeton	6	6
(England) M Bowring	11	11
(England) C R Carr	2	2
(England) Marian Horsley	w/o
(England) E Keith-Jopp	scr
(England) F Bowring	w/o
(England) K M Jones	scr
(England) I Nallard	13	11
(Republic of Ireland) Catherine Trench	10	5
(Wales) B Neville	11	11
(England) E Holman-Cox	5	3

Quarterfinals
(England) Radeglia	12	11
(England) Tragett	10	4
(England) Jackson	11	11
(England) Bowring M	5	3
(England) Horsley	11	14
(England) Bowring F	1	13
(England) Nallard	11	4	11
(Wales) Neville	8	11	8

Semifinals
(England) Radeglia	11	11
(England) Jackson	5	0
(England) Horsley	11	11
(England) Nallard	7	7

Final
(England) Radeglia	11	11
(England) Horsley	8	6

== Men's doubles ==
Semifinals
(Republic of Ireland) Frank Devlin & Curly Mack	15	15
(England) Raoul du Roveray & Herbert Uber	11	7
(England) Sir George Thomas & William Swinden	10	15	15
(England) A. W. Goodfellow & Edward Hawthorn	15	10	10

Final
(Republic of Ireland) Frank Devlin & Curly Mack	15	15
(England) Sir George Thomas & William Swinden	8	13

== Women's doubles ==
Semifinals
(England) Hazel Hogarth & Margaret Tragett	15	15
(Republic of Ireland) Dorothy Colpoys & (England) Miss Cobbett	10	9
(England) Violet Elton & Lavinia Radeglia	15	15
(England) Marian Horsley & Miss I. Nallard	4	8

Final
(England) Hazel Hogarth & Margaret Tragett	15	18
(England) Violet Elton & Lavinia Radeglia	3	15

== Mixed doubles ==
Semifinals
(Republic of Ireland) Curly Mack & (England) Margaret Tragett	15	15
(England) Raoul du Roveray & Mrs Marriott	8	4
(England) Sir George Thomas & Hazel Hogarth	15	15
(England) Captain H. A. Gardner & Mrs Millar	5	12

Final
(Republic of Ireland) Curly Mack & (England) Margaret Tragett	15	15
(England) Sir George Thomas & Hazel Hogarth	10	7
