= 1922 All England Badminton Championships =

1922 All England Open Badminton Championships
Tournament details
- Dates: 7 March 1922– 12 March 1922
- Edition: 19th
- Venue: Royal Horticultural Hall
- Location: Elverton Street, Westminster, London
- Official website: All England Championships

The 1922 All England Championships was a badminton tournament held at the Royal Horticultural Hall, Westminster, England from 7 March to 12 March 1922. Archibald Engelbach played under the alias Archibald Fee.

Sir George Thomas successfully defended the men's singles title for a third consecutive year as did Kitty McKane in the women's singles. Thomas and Hazel Hogarth secured a fourth consecutive mixed doubles title (the first won in 1914) and if it was not for the war years the number would surely have been much higher.

Irishman Frank Devlin became the first official overseas winner of a Championship title when winning the men's doubles with Guy Sautter. An Irish pair had won a non-Championship event during the 1902 All England Badminton Championships and Sautter himself was a Swiss/English dual national when winning events but played internationally for England during those events. The final event the women's doubles was won by Hogarth and Margaret Tragett.

== Final results ==
Category	Winners	Runners-up	Score
Men's singles	(England) Sir George Thomas	(England) Frank Hodge	15–14, 15-5
Women's singles	(England) Kitty McKane	(England) Margaret Tragett	11–7, 11-4
Men's doubles	(England) Guy Sautter & (Republic of Ireland) Frank Devlin	(England) Sir George Thomas & Frank Hodge	15–7, 15–9
Women's doubles	(England) Hazel Hogarth & Margaret Tragett	(Republic of Ireland) A. M. Head & (England) Violet Baddeley	15-11, 15–9
Mixed doubles	(England) Sir George Thomas & Hazel Hogarth	(England) Archibald Fee (Archibald Engelbach) & Kitty McKane	15-9, 15-4

== Men's singles ==
Second round
(England) Sir George Thomas	w/o
(England) F C W Lagden
(England) Henry Martin	15	18
(Scotland) W T Henderson	6	16
(England) Guy Sautter	15	15
(Scotland) E R Butcher	6	7
(England) William Swinden	7	15	15
(Scotland) Jackson Millar	15	9	2
(England) Frank Hodge	15	15
(England) Edward Hawthorn	2	3
(England) J H Colin Prior	15	15
(England) H A G Gardner	5	8
(England) A. K. Jones	15	15
(England) Percy Dupre	6	6
(England) G Greville	15	15
(Guernsey) Francis de Lisle Carey	11	5

Quarterfinals
(England) Thomas	15	15
(England) Martin	8	2
(England) Sautter	15	15
(England) Swinden	8	11
(England) Hodge	15	15
(England) Prior	8	9
(England) Jones	15	15
(England) Greville	5	8

Semifinals
(England) Thomas	15	15
(England) Sautter	3	12
(England) Hodge	15	15
(England) Jones	7	7

Final
(England) Thomas	15	15
(England) Hodge	14	5

== Women's singles ==
Second round
(England) Kitty McKane	11	11
(England) Marguerite Snaith	8	2
(England) E M Jones	w/o
(England) V O Fuller	scr
(England) Marjorie Barrett	11	11	11
(England) I Nallard	1	13	2
(England) G Jackson	11	11
(England) M E Templeton	9	7
(England) Margaret Tragett	11	11
(England) C M Bates	6	7
(Wales) B Neville	11	11
(England) M Holman-Cox	4	0
(Scotland) D M Aitken	9	11	11
(England) Joyce Nias	11	1	8
(England) Marjorie Emson	11	14
(England) Barbara Emson	8	13

Quarterfinals
(England) McKane K	11	11
(England) Jones	3	1
(England) Barrett	11	11
(England) Jackson	1	3
(England) Tragett	11	13
(Wales) Neville	5	12
(Scotland) Aitken	11	11
(England) Emson	6	1

Semifinals
(England) McKane K	11	9	13
(England) Barrett	0	11	10
(England) Tragett	11	11
(Scotland) Aitken	4	5

Final
(England) McKane	11	11
(England) Tragett	7	4

== Men's doubles ==
Semifinals
(England) Guy Sautter & (Republic of Ireland) Frank Devlin	15	14	15
(England) Raoul du Roveray & Herbert Uber	5	17	2
(England) Sir George Thomas & Frank Hodge	15	15
(England) Percy Dupre & R. H. W. Hope	3	12

Final
(England) Guy Sautter & (Republic of Ireland) Frank Devlin	15	15
(England) Sir George Thomas & Frank Hodge	7	9

== Women's doubles ==
Semifinals
(England) Hazel Hogarth & Margaret Tragett	18	18
(England) Marjorie Barrett & Dorothy Harvey	13	14
(Republic of Ireland) A. M. Head & (England) Violet Baddeley	15	15
(England) Marguerite Snaith & Miss A. M. Hogg	4	4

Final
(England) Hazel Hogarth & Margaret Tragett	15	15
(Republic of Ireland) A. M. Head & (England) Violet Baddeley	11	9

== Mixed doubles ==
Semifinals
(England) Sir George Thomas & Hazel Hogarth	16	15	15
(England) Guy Sautter & Eveline Peterson	17	2	11
(England) Archibald Fee & Kitty McKane	4	15	18
(England) Herbert Uber & Dorothy Harvey	15	11	16

Final
(England) Sir George Thomas & Hazel Hogarth	15	15
(England) Archibald Fee & Kitty McKane	9	4
