= 1924 All England Badminton Championships =

Tournament information
- Sport: Badminton
- Location: Royal Horticultural Halls, Westminster, England, United Kingdom
- Dates: March 4–March 9, 1924
- Established: 1899
- Website: All England Championships

The 1924 All England Championships was a badminton tournament held at the Royal Horticultural Halls, Westminster, England from March 4 to March 9, 1924.

== Final results ==
Category	Winners	Runners-up	Score
Men's singles	(Republic of Ireland) Curly Mack	(England) Sir George Thomas	17-15, 9-15, 15-6
Women's singles	(England) Kitty McKane	(England) Margaret Tragett	11–4, 11-2
Men's doubles	(England) Sir George Thomas & Frank Hodge	(England) A. K. Jones & William Swinden	15–6, 15–8
Women's doubles	(England) Kitty McKane & Margaret Stocks	(England) Violet Elton & (Republic of Ireland) A. M. Head	15-3, 15–13
Mixed doubles	(Republic of Ireland) Frank Devlin & (England) Kitty McKane	(England) Sir George Thomas & Hazel Hogarth	8-15, 15-11, 15-9

== Men's singles ==
First round
(Republic of Ireland) Curly Mack	15	15
(Republic of Ireland) Frank Devlin	8	11
(England) Herbert Uber	15	15
(England) E W Stubbs	1	0
(England) Frank Hodge	15	17
(England) M Rothwell-Jackson	11	14
(England) Albert Harbot	15	15
(Scotland) J W Millar	10	5
(England) Sir George Thomas	15	15
(England) Thomas Dick	14	9
(England) L B Feeny	15	15
(England) S H King	7	3
(England) William Swinden	15	15
(England) Henry Martin	13	9
(England) J Vincent	8	15	15
(England) K G Livingstone	15	12	6

Quarterfinals
(Republic of Ireland) Mack	15	11	15
(England) Uber	13	15	7
(England) Hodge	15	15
(England) Harbot	3	1
(England) Thomas	15	15
(England) Feeny	7	9
(England) Swinden	15	15
(England) Vincent	7	2

Semifinals
(Republic of Ireland) Mack	15	15
(England) Hodge	8	6
(England) Thomas	15	15
(England) Swinden	8	12

Final
(Republic of Ireland) Mack	17	9	15
(England) Thomas	15	15	6

== Women's singles ==
First round
(England) Kitty McKane	11	11
(England) F Bowring	0	3
(England) H D Cobbett	w/o
(England) Hassell	scr
(England) Marjorie Barrett	11	11
(England) M V Brock	3	3
(England) W B Rowe	w/o
(England) Marian Horsley	scr
(England) Margaret Tragett	11	11
(England) Margaret Stocks	4	4
(Republic of Ireland) Dorothy Colpoys	11	11
(England) E Holman-Cox	7	4
(Wales) B Neville	11	11
(England) B P Pentreath	2	0
(England) E St Ruth	11	11
(England) L M Singleton	5	5

Quarterfinals
(England) McKane	11	11
(England) Cobbett	2	1
(England) Barrett	11	11
(England) Rowe	0	0
(England) Tragett	11	11
(Republic of Ireland) Colpoys	5	5
(Wales) Neville	11	11
(England) St Ruth	2	7

Semifinals
(England) McKane	11	11
(England) Barrett	1	7
(England) Tragett	11	11	11
(Wales) Neville	11	13	4

Final
(England) McKane	11	11
(England) Tragett	4	2
