= 1921 All England Badminton Championships =

1921 All England Open Badminton Championships
Tournament details
- Dates: 2 March 1921– 6 March 1921
- Edition: 18th
- Venue: Royal Horticultural Hall
- Location: Elverton Street, Westminster, London
- Official website: All England Championships

The 1921 All England Championships was a badminton tournament held at the Royal Horticultural Hall, Westminster, England from 2 March to 6 March 1921.

Sir George Thomas successfully defended the men's singles title and he partnered Hazel Hogarth in also defending their mixed doubles crown. Kitty McKane made it three defending champions retaining their titles after winning the women's singles. McKane also partnered her older sister Margaret McKane when winning the women's doubles. The final championship event the men's doubles saw Thomas claim a third title at the 1921 Championships, with Frank Hodge.

== Final results ==
Category	Winners	Runners-up	Score
Men's singles	(England) Sir George Thomas	(England) Frank Hodge	15–7, 8-15, 15-3
Women's singles	(England) Kitty McKane	(England) Margaret Tragett	11–5, 11-6
Men's doubles	(England) Sir George Thomas & Frank Hodge	(Republic of Ireland) Frank Devlin & Curly Mack	7-15, 15–8, 15–13
Women's doubles	(England) Kitty McKane & Margaret McKane	(England) Violet Elton & Lavinia Radeglia	15-8, 15–11
Mixed doubles	(England) Sir George Thomas & Hazel Hogarth	(Republic of Ireland) Frank Devlin & E F Stewart	15-9, 15-3

== Men's singles ==
Second round
(England) Sir George Thomas	15	15
(England) J H Colin Prior	5	11
(England) R W H Hope	15	17
(Republic of Ireland) Johnnie McCallum	4	14
(England) William Swinden	15	15
(England) Percy V Dupre	7	9
(England) A. K. Jones	15	15	15
(England) A G MacDonnell	18	8	12
(England) Herbert Uber	15	15
(England) F W Lagden	2	2
(England) Henry Martin	15	15
(England) S Rowe	4	4
(Republic of Ireland) Curly Mack	15	15
(England) L B Feeny	0	1
(England) Frank Hodge	w/o
(England) E H Wood

Quarterfinals
(England) Thomas	15	15
(England) Hope	6	6
(England) Swinden	15	5	15
(England) Jones	8	15	6
(England) Uber	10	15	15
(England) Martin	15	4	5
(Republic of Ireland) Mack	15	8	1
(England) Hodge	9	15	15

Semifinals
(England) Thomas	15	15
(England) Swinden	8	9
(England) Uber	3	15	8
(England) Hodge	15	14	15

Final
(England) Thomas	15	8	15
(England) Hodge	7	15	3

== Women's singles ==
Second round
(England) Kitty McKane	w/o
(England) E D Pilkington	scr
(England) E M Holman-Cox	11	11
(England) Lady Raeburn	3	6
(England) Eveline Peterson	11	11
(England) M Holman-Cox	8	8
(Scotland) D M Aitken	w/o
(England) Constance Peterson	scr
(England) Margaret Tragett	11	11
(England) Marian Horsley	4	5
(England) G Jackson	11	7	11
(England) M E Templeton	1	11	0
(England) Margaret McKane	11	8	11
(England) Lavinia Radeglia	7	11	2
(Scotland) Margaret MacLehose	11	11
(Republic of Ireland) Catherine Trench	7	7

Quarterfinals
(England) McKane K	11	11
(England) Holman-Cox	5	1
(England) Peterson	7	14	11
(Scotland) Aitken	11	9	3
(England) Tragett	11	11
(England) Jackson	2	5
(England) McKane M	11	11
(Scotland) MacLehose	9	9

Semifinals
(England) McKane K	11	11
(England) Peterson	1	4
(England) Tragett	11	6	11
(England) McKane M	2	11	5

Final
(England) McKane	11	11
(England) Tragett	5	6

== Men's doubles ==
Semifinals
(England) Sir George Thomas & Frank Hodge	15	15
(England) Frederick Lohden & Herbert Uber	10	9
(Republic of Ireland) Frank Devlin & Curly Mack	15	15
(England) William Swinden & (Republic of Ireland) Johnnie McCallum	3	4

Final
(England) Sir George Thomas & Frank Hodge	7	15	15
(Republic of Ireland) Frank Devlin & Curly Mack	15	8	13

== Women's doubles ==
Semifinals
(England) Kitty McKane & Margaret McKane	15	15
(England) Margaret Tragett & Eveline Peterson	10	1
(England) Violet Elton & Lavinia Radeglia	18	15
(Republic of Ireland) A. M. Head & (England) Dorothy Harvey	15	7

Final
(England) Kitty McKane & Margaret McKane	15	15
(England) Violet Elton & Lavinia Radeglia	8	11

== Mixed doubles ==
Semifinals
(England) Sir George Thomas & Hazel Hogarth	15	15
(England) William Swinden & Marian Horsley	5	4
(Republic of Ireland) Frank Devlin & E F Stewart	15	15
(England) Frederick Lohden & Margaret McKane	10	2

Final
(England) Sir George Thomas & Hazel Hogarth	15	15
(Republic of Ireland) Frank Devlin & E F Stewart	9	3
