= Thomas Pattinson Dick =

English badminton player

Thomas P. Dick
Personal information
- Born: 27 October 1903 Gosforth, England
- Died: 1979 (aged 75–76) Doncaster, England

Sport
- Country: England
- Sport: Badminton

Thomas Pattinson Dick (1903–1979), was a male English badminton international.

== Badminton career ==
Dick born in Gosforth competed in the All England Open Badminton Championships where he was five times (three in men's singles and two in men's doubles) finalist. He represented England, Northumberland and Cheshire.

He won three Scottish Open and nine Welsh International titles. Dick was also a significant author of badminton books such as Badminton - Tactics in Singles and Doubles Play.

== Achievements ==
=== International tournaments (12 titles, 16 runners-up) ===
Men's singles
Year	Tournament	Opponent	Score	Result
1928	Irish Open	(England) Albert Harbot	6–15, 3–15	(silver) Runner-up
1928	Welsh International	(England) W. Basil Jones	15–7, 15–4	(gold) Winner
1929	Scottish Open	(England) Donald C. Hume	15–5, 15–3	(gold) Winner
1929	Welsh International	(England) Donald C. Hume	3–15, 15–8, 7–15	(silver) Runner-up
1930	Welsh International	(England) W. Basil Jones	15–6, 15–11	(gold) Winner
1931	All England Open	(Republic of Ireland) Frank Devlin	15–3, 10–15, 3–15	(silver) Runner-up
1932	Irish Open	(England) Raymond M. White	7–15, 3–15	(silver) Runner-up
1934	All England Open	(England) Ralph Nichols	11–15, 8–15	(silver) Runner-up
1935	Scottish Open	(England) C. H. Whittaker	2–15, 6–15	(silver) Runner-up
1936	Welsh International	(England) Maurice Field	13–15, 17–14, 15–12	(gold) Winner
1937	Scottish Open	(England) Ralph Nichols	15–13, 14–15, 11–15	(silver) Runner-up
1937	All England Open	(England) Ralph Nichols	8–15, 7–15	(silver) Runner-up

Men's doubles
Year	Tournament	Partner	Opponent	Score	Result
1929	Scottish Open	(England) Frank Hodge	(England) Donald C. Hume (England) P. D. Macfarlane	15–4, 15–17, 15–3	(gold) Winner
1929	All England Open	(England) Alan Titherley	(Republic of Ireland) Frank Devlin (Republic of Ireland) Curly Mack	2–15, 3–15	(silver) Runner-up
1930	Irish Open	(England) Frank Hodge	(England) Donald C. Hume (England) Herbert Uber	9–15, 10–15	(silver) Runner-up
1930	All England Open	(England) Alan Titherley	(Republic of Ireland) Frank Devlin (Republic of Ireland) Curly Mack	5–15, 10–15	(silver) Runner-up
1930	Welsh International	(England) W. Basil Jones	(Scotland) A. K. Stevenson (Scotland) J. J. McGarry	18–15, 15–10	(gold) Winner
1931	Scottish Open	(England) Frank Hodge	(England) K. G. Livingstone (England) Raymond M. White	17–18, 9–15	(silver) Runner-up
1932	Irish Open	(England) Raymond M. White	(England) Donald C. Hume (England) Ralph Nichols	11–15, 15–8, 2–15	(silver) Runner-up
1932	Welsh International	(Republic of Ireland) Willoughby Hamilton	(England) Donald C. Hume (England) Raymond M. White	7–15, 15–11, 6–15	(silver) Runner-up
1936	Irish Open	(England) Alan Titherley	(Republic of Ireland) Ian Maconachie (Republic of Ireland) James Rankin	7–15, 12–15	(silver) Runner-up
1937	Welsh International	(England) H. E. Baldwin	(Republic of Ireland) Ian Maconachie (England) Raymond M. White	17–15, 15–6	(gold) Winner

Mixed doubles
Year	Tournament	Partner	Opponent	Score	Result
1928	Welsh International	(England) Hazel Hogarth	(Republic of Ireland) John McCallum (England) Marian Horsley	15–3, 15–7	(gold) Winner
1929	Welsh International	(England) Hazel Hogarth	(England) Donald C. Hume (Wales) B. Neville	15–3, 15–11	(gold) Winner
1930	Welsh International	(England) Hazel Hogarth	(Scotland) F. L. Treasure (Wales) Cathcart Jones	15–11, 15–9	(gold) Winner
1931	Scottish Open	(England) Marian Horsley	(England) Donald C. Hume (Scotland) M. K. King Clark	17–15, 18–15	(gold) Winner
1932	Welsh International	(England) Hazel Hogarth	(England) Ralph Nichols (England) Nora Coop	15–3, 1–15, 15–12	(gold) Winner
1937	Welsh International	(England) Collitt	(Republic of Ireland) Thomas Boyle (Republic of Ireland) Olive Wilson	12–15, 10–15	(silver) Runner-up
