= Leslie Nichols =

English badminton player

Personal information
- Born: Third Quarter 1907 Islington, England

Sport
- Country: England
- Sport: Badminton

Leslie Nichols (1907-date of death unknown), was a badminton player from England.

== Badminton career ==
Nichols was born in Islington in 1907. He was a three times winner of the All England Open Badminton Championships. He won the doubles with his younger brother Ralph Nichols, for three consecutive years from 1936 until 1938.

== Family ==
Nichols and his brother lived at 1 Willow Bridge Road, Canonbury in 1911.

== Achievements ==
=== International tournaments ===
Men's doubles
Year	Tournament	Partner	Opponent	Score	Result
1931	Welsh International	(England) Ralph Nichols	(Republic of Ireland) Arthur Hamilton (Republic of Ireland) Willoughby Hamilton	15–8, 12–15, 2–15	(silver) Runner-up
1932	All England Open	(England) Ralph Nichols	(England) Donald C. Hume (England) Raymond M. White	15–14, 16–18, 4–15	(silver) Runner-up
1934	All England Open	(England) Ralph Nichols	(England) Donald C. Hume (England) Raymond M. White	12–15, 15–12, 7–15	(silver) Runner-up
1935	All England Open	(England) Ralph Nichols	(England) Donald C. Hume (England) Raymond M. White	12–15, 13–15	(silver) Runner-up
1936	All England Open	(England) Ralph Nichols	(England) Donald C. Hume (England) Raymond M. White	15–7, 15–2	(gold) Winner
1937	All England Open	(England) Ralph Nichols	(England) Donald C. Hume (England) Raymond M. White	15–6, 18–14	(gold) Winner
1938	All England Open	(England) Ralph Nichols	(Republic of Ireland) Ian Maconachie (England) Raymond M. White	15–12, 7–15, 15–9	(gold) Winner
1939	All England Open	(England) Ralph Nichols	(Republic of Ireland) Thomas Boyle (Republic of Ireland) James Rankin	4–15, 3–15	(silver) Runner-up

Mixed doubles
Year	Tournament	Partner	Opponent	Score	Result
1931	Welsh International	(England) Hazel Hogarth	(England) Ralph Nichols (England) Nora Coop	8–15, 15–18	(silver) Runner-up
