= 1920 All England Badminton Championships =

1920 All England Open Badminton Championships
Tournament details
- Dates: 2 March 1920– 7 March 1920
- Edition: 17th
- Venue: Royal Horticultural Hall
- Location: Elverton Street, Westminster, London
- Official website: All England Championships

The 1920 All England Championships was a badminton tournament held at the Royal Horticultural Hall, Westminster, England from 2 March to 7 March 1920. It was the first All England Championships since 1914 following a six year break because of World War I.

George Thomas played under the alias George Allen and finally won his first men's singles title after many years of trying, his best previous singles result was as a losing finalist 16 years earlier in 1904. Another player Archibald Engelbach played under the alias Archibald Fee and won the doubles with Raoul du Roveray.

K. S. Tann was listed as representing China in the first round of the men's singles and was beaten by the defending champion Guy Sautter 15-1, 15-3. It was the first instance of a Chinese player appearing at the Championships. Tann partnered by Mackinnon also made it to the semi-finals of the men's doubles.

== Final results ==
Category	Winners	Runners-up	Score
Men's singles	(England) George Allen (Sir George Thomas)	(England) William Swinden	15–9, 14-17, 15-5
Women's singles	(England) Kitty McKane	(England) Margaret Tragett	11–6, 11-5
Men's doubles	(England) Archibald Fee (Archibald Engelbach) & Raoul du Roveray	(England) J. H. Colin Prior & Herbert Uber	15–13, 15–8
Women's doubles	(England) Violet Elton & Lavinia Radeglia	(England) D. Harvey & Mrs Reynolds+	17-15, 5–15, 15–10
Mixed doubles	(England) George Allen (Sir George Thomas) & Hazel Hogarth	(England) Guy Sautter & D. Harvey	15-12, 15-12

+ alias

== Men's singles ==
Second round
(England) George Allen	15	15
(England) Herbert Uber	11	4
(England) Guy Sautter	15	15
(England) J. H. Colin Prior	3	5
(Scotland) Jackson W. Millar	15	15
(England) A. Mackinnon	6	6
(Republic of Ireland) Frank Devlin	15	12	17
(England) A. K. Jones	8	15	14
(Scotland) W. T. Henderson	15	15
(England) R. G. P. Hunter	12	12
(England) Douglas Parsloe	15	15
(England) C. W. Hordern	5	5
(England) A. G. Macdonnell	15	15
(England) J. K. James	6	6
(England) William Swinden	15	15
(England) Bertrand Peek	0	10

Quarterfinals
(England) Allen	15	3	15
(England) Sautter	12	15	12
(Scotland) Millar	w/o
(Republic of Ireland) Devlin	scr
(Scotland) Henderson	15	15
(England) Parsloe	0	6
(England) Macdonnell	11	9
(England) Swinden	15	15

Semifinals
(England) Allen	15	15
(Scotland) Millar	8	8
(Scotland) Henderson	1	15	3
(England) Swinden	15	12	15

Final
(England) Allen	15	14	15
(England) Swinden	9	17	5

== Women's singles ==
First round
(England) Kitty McKane	11	11
(England) Violet Baddeley	2	5
(England) A. Wheelwright
(England) Lavinia Radeglia
(England) Margaret Tragett
(England) Marguerite Snaith
(Scotland) D. M. Aitken
(England) Miss A. M. Hogg

Quarterfinals
(England) McKane	11	11
(England) Wheelwright	1	0
(England) Radeglia
(England) Tragett	11	13
(England) Snaith	0	11
(Scotland) Aitken	11	6	11
(England) Hogg	2	11	4

Semifinals
(England) McKane	11	11
(England) Radeglia	4	1
(England) Tragett	11	11
(Scotland) Aitken	2	2

Final
(England) McKane	11	11
(England) Tragett	6	5

== Men's doubles ==
Semifinals
(England) Archibald Engelbach (England) Raoul du Roveray	15	17
(England) Frank Chesterton (England) Sir George Thomas	6	15
(England) Herbert Uber (England) J. H. Colin Prior	15	15
(England) A. Mackinnon (China) K. S. Tann	2	10

Final
(England) Archibald Engelbach (England) Raoul du Roveray	15	15
(England) Herbert Uber (England) J. H. Colin Prior	13	8

== Women's doubles ==
Semifinals
(England) Violet Elton (England) Lavinia Radeglia	13	15	15
(England) Kitty McKane (England) Hazel Hogarth	18	3	11
(England) Miss D. Harvey (England) Mrs Reynolds+	15	15
(England) Violet Baddeley (Republic of Ireland) E. M. Stewart	3	12

Final
(England) Violet Elton (England) Lavinia Radeglia	17	5	15
(England) Miss D. Harvey (England) Mrs Reynolds+	15	15	10

+ alias

== Mixed doubles ==
Semifinals
(England) Sir George Thomas (England) Hazel Hogarth	w/o
(England) Frank Chesterton (England) Margaret Tragett	scr
(England) Guy Sautter (England) Miss D. Harvey	15	15
(England) Raoul du Roveray (England) Christina Douglass	1	3

Final
(England) Sir George Thomas (England) Hazel Hogarth	15	15
(England) Guy Sautter (England) Miss D. Harvey	12	12
