= 1966 All England Badminton Championships =

1966 All England Championships
Tournament details
- Dates: 23 March 1966– 26 March 1966
- Edition: 56th
- Venue: Wembley Arena
- Location: London

The 1966 All England Championships was a badminton tournament held at Wembley Arena, London, England, from 23–26 March 1966.

== Final results ==
Category	Winners	Runners-up	Score
Men's singles	(Malaysia) Tan Aik Huang	(Japan) Masao Akiyama	15-7, 15-4
Women's singles	(United States) Judy Hashman	(Netherlands) Imre Rietveld	11-6, 11-7
Men's doubles	(Malaysia) Ng Boon Bee & Tan Yee Khan	(Denmark) Finn Kobbero & Jørgen Hammergaard Hansen	9-15, 15-9, 17-15
Women's doubles	(United States) Judy Hashman & (Republic of Ireland) Sue Peard	(Denmark) Karin Jørgensen & Ulla Strand	15-5, 14-17, 15-12
Mixed doubles	(Denmark) Finn Kobberø & Ulla Strand	(Denmark) Per Walsøe & Pernille Mølgaard Hansen	15-13, 15-3

Heather Ward married and played under the name Heather Nielsen.

== Men's singles ==
=== Section 1 ===
Round of 32
(Malaysia) Tan Aik Huang +	15	15
(Canada) Yves Pare	12	2
(Japan) Takeshi Miyanaga	12	15	15
(England) Ray Sharp	15	2	7
(Indonesia) Wong Pek Sheng	15	15
(England) Paul Whetnall	9	4
(Denmark) Ole Murtens	15	15
(England) J G Pearson	7	3
(India) Dinesh Khanna	15	15
(West Germany) Willi Braun	8	8
(Sweden) Kurt Johnsson	14	15	15
(Malaysia) Punch Gunalan	17	4	1
(Malaysia) Tan Yee Khan	18	15
(Scotland) Bob McCoig	16	10
(England) David Horton	15	18
(England) Tony Pears	7	14

Round of 16
(Malaysia) Aik Huang	9	15	15
(Japan) Miyanaga	15	10	7
(Indonesia) Pek Shen	15	15
(Denmark) Murtens	5	2
(India) Khanna	15	15
(Sweden) Johnsson	10	10
(Malaysia) Yee Khan	15	15
(England) Horton	8	7

Quarter-finals
(Malaysia) Aik Huang	15	15
(Indonesia) Pek Shen	9	5
(India) Khanna	15	15
(Malaysia) Yee Khan	5	14	ret

Semi-finals
(Malaysia) Aik Huang	15	15
(India) Khanna	4	9

=== Section 2 ===
Round of 32
(Japan) Masao Akiyama	15	15
(Malaysia) Yew Cheng Hoe	13	5
(Malaysia) Oon Chong Teik	15	15
(Sweden) Goran Wahlqvist	5	5
(Denmark) Knud Aage Nielsen	17	15
(Canada) Edward Paterson	15	10
(England) John Stanford	8	15	15
(West Germany) Friedhelm Wulff	15	9	0
(Indonesia) Ang Tjin Siang	15	15
(Denmark) Franz Beinvogel	2	10
(Malaysia) Oon Chong Jin	15	15
(England) B E Jones	3	6
(Denmark) Svend Andersen Pri	15	4	15
(Malaysia) Oon Chong Hau	13	15	9
(India) Suresh Goel	10	15	15
(New Zealand) Richard Purser	15	9	7

Round of 16
(Japan) Akiyama	15	15
(Malaysia) Teik	8	10
(Denmark) Nielsen	15	15
(England) Stanford	11	10
(Indonesia) Siang	15	15
(Malaysia) Chong Jin	11	8
(Denmark) Andersen Pri	17	10	15
(India) Goel	14	15	8

Quarter-finals
(Japan) Akiyama	16	15	15
(Denmark) Nielsen	17	4	3
(Indonesia) Siang	5	15	15
(Denmark) Andersen Pri	15	7	7

Semi-finals
(Japan) Akiyama	15	10	15
(Indonesia) Siang	12	15	6

== Women's singles ==
=== Section 1 ===
Round of 32
(United States) Judy Hashman +	11	11
(Netherlands) Felice de Nooyer	0	7
(Denmark) Ulla Strand	11	12
(Denmark) Lonny Funch	3	9
(England) Ursula Smith	11	11
(South Africa) Ann Smith	7	5
(West Germany) Gerda Schumacher	11	11
(Republic of Ireland) Sue Peard	7	4
(England) Angela Bairstow +	11	11
(West Germany) Heidi Menacher	0	6
(New Zealand) Sonya Cox	11	11
(England) Margaret Boxall	4	6
(Denmark) Lizbeth von Barnekow	11	11
(England) Phyllis Kirkwood	2	7
(Netherlands) Agnes Geene	11	12
(England) Sheila Ryder	8	9

Round of 16
(United States) Hashman	11	8	11
(Denmark) Strand	4	11	2
(England) Smith	11	11	11
(West Germany) Schumacher	12	3	1
(England) Bairstow	11	11
(New Zealand) Cox	5	4
(Denmark) von Barnekow	11	11
(Netherlands) Geene	3	8

Quarter-finals
(United States) Hashman	11	10	11
(England) Smith	2	12	9
(England) Bairstow	11	11
(Denmark) von Barnekow	9	5

Semi-finals
(United States) Hashman	11	11
(England) Bairstow	4	6

=== Section 2 ===
Round of 32
(Netherlands) Imre Rietveld	11	11
(South Africa) M Harris	1	1
(Denmark) Bente Flindt	10	11	4
(England) Gillian Perrin	12	5
(Sweden) Eva Twedberg	12	11
(Scotland) Muriel Ferguson	9	5
(Denmark) Karin Jørgensen	11	7	11
(West Germany) Marieluise Wackerow	5	11	4
(England) Heather Nielsen +	11	11
(Denmark) Pernille Mølgaard Hansen	4	2
(England) P M Andrew	11	7	11
(Netherlands) Marja Ridder	6	11	1
(West Germany) Irmgard Latz	11	11
(Republic of Ireland) Yvonne Kelly	3	3
(England) Iris Rogers	11	8	11
(England) Julie Charles	9	11	3

Round of 16
(Netherlands) Rietveld	10	11	11
(Denmark) Flindt	12	3	8
(Sweden) Twedberg	11	3	11
(Denmark) Jørgensen	4	11	5
(England) Nielsen	11	11
(England) Andrew	0	4
(West Germany) Latz	11	11
(England) Rogers	3	1

Quarter-finals
(Netherlands) Rietveld	11	9	11
(Sweden) Twedberg	9	11	2
(England) Nielsen	7	11	11
(West Germany) Latz	11	7	2

Semi-finals
(Netherlands) Rietveld	11	8	11
(England) Nielsen	9	11	8
