= 1958 All England Badminton Championships =

1958 All England Championships
Tournament details
- Dates: 19 March 1958– 23 March 1958
- Edition: 48th
- Venue: Wembley
- Location: London

The 1958 All England Championships was a badminton tournament held at Wembley, London, England, from 19–23 March 1958.

== Final results ==
| Category | Winners | Runners-up | Score |
|---|---|---|---|
| Men's singles | (Denmark) Erland Kops | (Denmark) Finn Kobberø | 15-10, 8-15, 15-8 |
| Women's singles | (United States) Judy Devlin | (United States) Margaret Varner | 11-7, 12-10 |
| Men's doubles | (Denmark) Erland Kops & Poul-Erik Nielsen | (Denmark) Finn Kobberø & Jørgen Hammergaard Hansen | 15-7, 11-15, 15-8 |
| Women's doubles | (United States) Margaret Varner & (England) Heather Ward | (England) Iris Rogers & June Timperley | 15-12, 15-2 |
| Mixed doubles | (England) Tony Jordan & June Timperley | (Denmark) Finn Kobberø & Aase Winther | 15-9, 7-15, 15-5 |

== Results ==
=== Men's singles ===
==== Section 1 ====
Round of 32
1 | (Malaysia) Eddy Choong | 15 | 15
(South Africa) C Bartlett | 6 | 8
(Sweden) Bo Nilsson | w/o
(England) R Quiddington
(Denmark) Erland Kops + | 15 | 15
(Republic of Ireland) G Henderson | 12 | 6
(England) John Timperley | 15 | 15
(Malaysia) Harry Parmar | 4 | 11
(Sweden) Berndt Dahlberg + | 15 | 15
(India) I P S Gill | 3 | 4
(England) Tony Jordan | 15 | 15
(England) Ken Stott | 5 | 7
(Malaysia) Oon Chong Jin + | 15 | 15
(England) Dick Hashman | 13 | 10
(England) R Mulvaney | 15 | 15
(Denmark) Poul Erik Nielsen | 2 | 10

Round of 16
1 | (Malaysia) Choong | 15 | 18
(Sweden) Nilsson | 11 | 17
(Denmark) Kops | 15 | 15
(England) Timperley | 7 | 7
(Sweden) Dahlberg | 15 | 15
(England) Jordan | 5 | 2
(Malaysia) Chong Jin | 15 | 15
(England) Mulvaney | 5 | 5

Quarterfinals
1 | (Malaysia) Choong | 15 | 2 | 8
(Denmark) Kops | 1 | 15 | 15
(Sweden) Dahlberg | 15 | 15
(Malaysia) Chong Jin | 8 | 6

Semifinals
1 | (Denmark) Kops | 15 | 15
(Sweden) Dahlberg | 7 | 12

===== Section 2 =====
Round of 32
(Malaysia) B K Wong | 15 | 15
(England) C A Darnell | 7 | 3
(Malaysia) Oon Chong Teik + | 15 | 15
(England) L Ellwood | 4 | 4
(Denmark) Bjorn Holst-Christensen | 7 | 15 | 15
(England) Roger Mills | 15 | 10 | 3
(Indonesia) Ferry Sonneville | 15 | 15
(Denmark) Jørgen Hammergaard Hansen | 1 | 5
(England) Hugh Findlay | 15 | 15
(Malaysia) I Arasaradnam | 3 | 3
(Sweden) Bertil Glans + | 15 | 15
(Malaysia) David Ewe Choong | 6 | 4
(Denmark) Finn Kobberø + | 15 | 15
(Wales) Gordon Rowlands | 8 | 3
(Scotland) Bob McCoig | 15 | 8 | 15
(Republic of Ireland) Charles McCormack | 12 | 15 | 6

Round of 16
(Malaysia) Wong | 8 | 8
(Malaysia) Teik | 15 | 15
(Denmark) Holst-C | 9 | 2
(Indonesia) Sonneville | 15 | 15
(England) Findlay | 6 | 11
(Sweden) Glans | 15 | 15
(Denmark) Kobberø | 15 | 15
(Scotland) McCoig | 7 | 7

Quarterfinals
(Malaysia) Teik | 9 | 0
(Indonesia) Sonneville | 15 | 15
(Sweden) Glans | 14 | 9
(Denmark) Kobberø | 17 | 15

Semifinals
(Indonesia) Sonneville | 15 | 11 | 3
(Denmark) Kobberø | 5 | 15 | 15

== Women's singles ==
=== Section 1 ===
Round of 32
(United States) Judy Devlin + | 11 | 11
(Republic of Ireland) Lena Rea | 0 | 0
(England) P Warner | 12 | 11
(England) K M Castle | 10 | 5
(Denmark) Tonny Holst-Christensen + | 11 | 11
(England) Sylvia Ripley | 5 | 3
(Scotland) Wilma Tyre | 7 | 11 | 11
(England) N S Jones | 11 | 5 | 3
(England) Heather Ward + | 11 | 11
(England) H C Guntrip | 3 | 3
(Republic of Ireland) Mary O'Sullivan | 11 | 11
(England) Barbara Carpenter | 2 | 1
(United States) H McGregor-Stewart + | 11 | 11
(England) K Hindle | 5 | 4
(Denmark) Anni Hammergaard Hansen | 11 | 5 | 11
(England) Audrey Marshall | 1 | 11 | 7

Round of 16
(United States) Devlin J | 11 | 11
(England) Warner | 0 | 0
(Denmark) Holst-C | 11 | 8 | 11
(Scotland) Tyre | 4 | 11 | 7
(England) Ward | 11 | 11
(Republic of Ireland) O'Sullivan | 2 | 5
(United States) McGregor-Stewart | 11 | 11
(Denmark) Hammergaard-Hansen | 5 | 4

Quarterfinals
(United States) Devlin J | 11 | 11
(Denmark) Holst-C | 4 | 4
(England) Ward | 11 | 11
(United States) McGregor-Stewart | 3 | 2

Semifinals
(United States) Devlin J | 10 | 11 | 12
(England) Ward | 12 | 0 | 9

=== Section 2 ===
Round of 32
(United States) Margaret Varner + | 11 | 11
(Republic of Ireland) R Smyth | 2 | 3
(England) J F Cryer | 11 | 11
(England) M E Govett | 2 | 6
(Denmark) Aase Winther | 11 | 12
(England) June Timperley + | 7 | 10
(England) P E Broad | 11 | 9 | 11
(England) Audrey Stone | 4 | 11 | 9
(Thailand) Pratuang Pattabongse | 0 | 11 | 11
(England) Iris Rogers + | 11 | 5 | 7
(United States) Sue Devlin | 11 | 11
(England) B Holborn | 4 | 7
(United States) Abbie Rutledge | 11 | 11
(Scotland) Catherine Dunglisson | 7 | 5
(Republic of Ireland) Yvonne Kelly + | 11 | 11
(England) P A Lawrence | 7 | 3

Round of 16
(United States) Varner | 11 | 11
(England) Cryer | 2 | 0
(Denmark) Winther | 9 | 11 | 12
(England) Broad | 11 | 3 | 9
(Thailand) Pattabongse | 11 | 11
(United States) Devlin S | 7 | 7
(United States) Rutledge | 11 | 11
(Republic of Ireland) Kelly | 0 | 2

Quarterfinals
(United States) Varner | 11 | 11
(Denmark) Winther | 3 | 4
(Thailand) Pattabongse | 11 | 11
(United States) Rutledge | 8 | 4

Semifinals
(United States) Varner | 11 | 11
(Thailand) Pattabongse | 2 | 1
