= 1937 All England Badminton Championships =

Tournament information
- Sport: Badminton
- Location: Royal Horticultural Halls, Westminster, England, United Kingdom
- Dates: March 1–March 6, 1937
- Established: 1899
- Website: All England Championships

The 1937 All England Championships was a badminton tournament held at the Royal Horticultural Halls, Westminster, England from March 1 to March 6, 1937.

== Final results ==
Category	Winners	Runners-up	Score
Men's singles	(England) Ralph Nichols	(England) Thomas P. Dick	15-8, 15–7
Women's singles	(England) Thelma Kingsbury	(England) Diana Doveton	11-0, 11–0
Men's doubles	(England) Ralph Nichols & Leslie Nichols	(England) Raymond White & Donald Hume	15-6, 18–14
Women's doubles	(England) Betty Uber & Diana Doveton	(England) Thelma Kingsbury & Marje Henderson	17-18, 15–1, 15–2
Mixed doubles	(Republic of Ireland) Ian Maconachie & (England) Thelma Kingsbury	(England) Ralph Nichols & (Scotland) J W Stewart	15-11, 15–12

=== Results ===
==== Men's singles ====
Second round
(England) Ralph Nichols	15	15
(Canada) V de B Oland	4	3
(England) Tom Wingfield	15	15
(England) Denzil Jordeson	5	6
(England) Maurice Field	15	15
(England) C Christopherson	9	6
(Republic of Ireland) James Rankin	7	15	17
(England) Leslie Nichols	15	11	14
(England) Thomas P. Dick	15	15
(England) Cyril Freeman-Wilcoxson	3	10
(Republic of Ireland) Thomas Boyle	15	15
(England) Kenneth Wilson	5	9
(England) C H Whittaker	11	15	15
(England) Raymond White	15	5	10
(England) C W Whiteford	18	15	15
(England) R D Champion	17	17	9

Quarterfinals
(England) Nichols	15	15
(England) Wingfield	4	12
(England) Field	15	15
(Republic of Ireland) Rankin	7	8
(England) Dick	6	15	18
(Republic of Ireland) Boyle	15	4	17
(England) Whittaker	15	15
(England) Whiteford	10	10

Semifinals
(England) Nichols	15	15
(England) Field	9	10
(England) Dick	15	4	15
(England) Whittaker	9	15	12

Final
(England) Nichols	15	15
(England) Dick	8	7

==== Women's singles ====
Second round
(England) Thelma Kingsbury	11	11
(Republic of Ireland) E Hall	0	0
(England) June Goodall	11	11
(England) Bessie Staples	6	2
(England) Betty Uber	w/o
(England) P E Hall
(Republic of Ireland) Mavis Macnaughton^{[n]}	6	11	13
(England) A Y Richardson	11	3	12
(England) Diana Doveton	11	11
(England) C D Newitt	4	5
(England) G Graham	2	11	11
(Republic of Ireland) Olive Wilson	11	4	4
(England) Queenie Allen	14	8	11
(England) Daphne Young	10	11	7
(Republic of Ireland) Norma Stoker	7	11	11
(England) D E Homan	11	3	6

Quarterfinals
(England) Kingsbury	11	11
(England) Goodall	7	8
(England) Uber	11	11
(Republic of Ireland) Macnaughton	3	3
(England) Doveton	11	11
(England) Graham	3	6
(England) Allen	7	11	11
(Republic of Ireland) Stoker	11	3	0

Semifinals
(England) Kingsbury	11	11
(England) Uber	5	9
(England) Doveton	11	9	11
(England) Allen	5	11	7

Final
(England) Kingsbury	11	11
(England) Doveton	0	0

^{^[n]} Mavis Hamilton married and competed as Mavis Macnaughton
