= 1961 All England Badminton Championships =

1961 All England Championships
Tournament details
- Dates: 14 March 1961– 17 March 1961
- Edition: 51st
- Venue: Wembley
- Location: London

The 1961 All England Championships was a badminton tournament held at Wembley, London, England, from 14 to 17 March 1961.

In 1960 Judy Devlin married and returned to the championships as Judy Hashman, her sister Sue Devlin also married and became Sue Peard and decided to represent Ireland, the native country of her father and former men's champion Frank Devlin.

== Final results ==
Category	Winners	Runners-up	Score
Men's singles	(Denmark) Erland Kops	(Denmark) Finn Kobberø	15-10, 15-6
Women's singles	(United States) Judy Hashman-Devlin	(England) Ursula Smith	11-2, 11-6
Men's doubles	(Denmark) Finn Kobberø & Jørgen Hammergaard Hansen	(Denmark) Erland Kops & Poul-Erik Nielsen	15-6, 15-3
Women's doubles	(Republic of Ireland) Sue Peard-Devlin & (United States) Judy Hashman-Devlin	(Scotland) Catherine Dunglison & Wilma Tyre	15-5 15-4
Mixed doubles	(Denmark) Finn Kobberø & Kirsten Thorndahl	(England) Tony Jordan & June Timperley	15-12, 15-5

== Results ==
=== Men's singles ===
==== Section 1 ====
Round of 32
1	(Denmark) Erland Kops	15	15
(Wales) Gordon Rowlands	9	5
(England) Trevor Coates	15	15
(Malaysia) B K Wong	6	6
(Scotland) Bob McCoig +	13	15	15
(England) J T Woodhouse	15	3	7
(Sweden) Bengt-Ake Jonsson	15	7	15
(England) John Havers	3	15	6
(Malaysia) Oon Chong Teik	15	9	18
(Denmark) Knud Aage Nielsen	4	15	13
(Thailand) Charoen Wattanasin +	15	15
(Denmark) Poul Erik Nielsen	2	7
(Sweden) Bertil Glans	15	8	15
(India) M Vincent	7	15	3
(England) Bill Havers	17	15
(England) Jack Downey	15	12	ret

Round of 16
1	(Denmark) Kops	15	15
(England) Coates	2	10
(Scotland) McCoig	15	15
(Sweden) Jonsson	6	7
(Malaysia) Teik	17	15
(Thailand) Wattanasin	14	7
(Sweden) Glans	15	15
(England) Bill Havers	9	10

Quarterfinals
1	(Denmark) Kops	15	15
(Scotland) McCoig	2	8
(Malaysia) Teik	17	15
(Sweden) Glans	14	7

Semifinals
1	(Denmark) Kops	15	15
(Malaysia) Teik	8	8

==== Section 2 ====
Round of 32
(Denmark) Finn Kobberø	18	15
(Malaysia) Yeoh Keaw Hua	14	2
(Denmark) Ole Mertz	15	15
(England) Kenneth Derrick	3	10
(England) Hugh Findlay	15	17
(Scotland) Frank Shannon	12	15
(Denmark) Bjorn Holst-Christensen	15	15
(England) John Stanford	3	4
2	(Indonesia) Ferry Sonneville	15	15
(England) David Horton	1	6
(England) David Rowe	15	10	18
(Malaysia) R T Ponnambalam	6	15	15
(Denmark) Henning Borch +	15	15
(England) Tony Jordan	7	2
(Malaysia) Lee Kin Tat	15	15
(England) F C Woodley	4	2

Round of 16
(Denmark) Kobberø	15	15
(Denmark) Mertz	5	5
(England) Findlay	15	15
(Denmark) Holst-C	8	4
2	(Indonesia) Sonneville	15	15
(England) Rowe	2	2
(Denmark) Borch	18	15
(Malaysia) Kin Tat	13	6

Quarterfinals
(Denmark) Kobberø	15	15
(England) Findlay	7	7
2	(Indonesia) Sonneville	15	15
(Denmark) Borch	5	2

Semifinals
(Denmark) Kobberø	15	15
2	(Indonesia) Sonneville	11	3

=== Women's singles ===
==== Section 1 ====
Round of 32
(United States) Judy Hashman +
(England) F I Horne
(England) Angela Bairstow
(Denmark) Kirsten Dahl
(New Zealand) Sonya Cox	11	11
(England) A H Larman	4	2
(Denmark) Tonny Holst-Christensen+	11	11
(England) M J Frost	1	2
(Republic of Ireland) Mary O'Sullivan	w/o
(Thailand) Pratuang Pattabongse
(England) M E Govett	4	11	11
(England) Rita Rahey	11	6	1

Round of 16
(United States) Hashman	11	11
(England) Horne	0	3
(England) Bairstow	10	11	11
(Denmark) Dahl	12	2	4
(New Zealand) Cox	11	1	11
(Denmark) Holst-C	3	11	4
(Republic of Ireland) O'Sullivan	11	11
(England) Govett	1	3

Quarterfinals
(United States) Hashman	11	11
(England) Bairstow	1	1
(New Zealand) Cox	11	11
(Republic of Ireland) O'Sullivan	6	1

Semifinals
(United States) Hashman	11	11
(New Zealand) Cox	2	5

==== Section 2 ====
Round of 32
(England) Ursula Smith
(England) B Holborn
(Republic of Ireland) Sue Peard-Devlin
(Denmark) Hanne Jensen +
(Scotland) Wilma Tyre	12	4	11
(Republic of Ireland) Yvonne Kelly	9	11	3
(England) Jenny Pritchard
(Denmark) Inge Hasselsteen +	11	11
(England) Sheila Ryder	4	7
(England) Eileen Pattison	8	11	11
(England) Anita Price	11	2	9

Round of 16
(England) Smith	11	11
(England) Holborn	4	1
(Republic of Ireland) Peard	7	12
(Denmark) Jensen	11	11
(Scotland) Tyre	7	11	11
(England) Pritchard	11	6	4
(Denmark) Hasselsteen	6	11	11
(England) Pattison	11	5	0

Quarterfinals
(England) Smith	11	11
(Republic of Ireland) Peard	3	1
(Scotland) Tyre	11	9	11
(Denmark) Hasselsteen	7	11	3

Semifinals
(England) Smith	11	11
(Scotland) Tyre	8	5
