= 1964 All England Open Badminton Championships =

1964 All England Championships
Tournament details
- Dates: 1–4 April 1964
- Edition: 54th
- Venue: Wembley Arena
- Location: London, England

Champions
- Men's singles: (Denmark) Knud Aage Nielsen
- Women's singles: (United States) Judy Hashman
- Men's doubles: (Denmark) Finn Kobberø (Denmark) Jørgen Hammergaard Hansen
- Women's doubles: (Denmark) Karin Jørgensen (Denmark) Ulla Rasmussen
- Mixed doubles: (England) Tony Jordan (England) Jenny Pritchard

The 1964 All England Championships was a badminton tournament held at Wembley Arena, London, England from 1 to 4 April 1964.

== Final results ==
Category	Winners	Runners-up	Score
Men's singles	(Denmark) Knud Aage Nielsen	(Denmark) Henning Borch	8-15, 17–15, 15–4
Women's singles	(United States) Judy Hashman	(England) Ursula Smith	11-0, 11–3
Men's doubles	(Denmark) Finn Kobberø & Jørgen Hammergaard Hansen	(Denmark) Erland Kops & Poul-Erik Nielsen	15-6, 15–3
Women's doubles	(Denmark) Karin Jørgensen & Ulla Rasmussen	(United States) Judy Hashman & (Republic of Ireland) Sue Peard	15-11, 6–15, 15–10
Mixed doubles	(England) Tony Jordan & Jenny Pritchard	(Denmark) Finn Kobberø & Ulla Rasmussen	15-10, 18–13

== Men's singles ==
=== Section 1 ===
Round of 32
(Denmark) Knud Aage Nielsen	15	15
(Sweden) Kurt Johnsson	10	10
(England) D. L. Ball	15	15
(Republic of Ireland) Robert Harris	5	6
(Thailand) Charoen Wattanasin	15	15
(England) Bill Andrew	5	1
(England) Roger Mills	15	14	15
(Malaysia) Ng Goon Foong	5	17	4
(Malaysia) Lee Kin Tat	15	15
(England) William Havers	5	7
(England) David Rowe	15	15
(Austria) Hermann Fröhlich	7	6
(Denmark) Erland Kops	15	15
(England) Ray Sharp	4	12
(Denmark) Tom Bacher	6	15	15
(Sweden) Willi Lund	15	8	5

Round of 16
(Denmark) Nielsen	15	15
(England) Ball	3	3
(Thailand) Wattanasin	15	15
(England) Mills	8	5
(Malaysia) Kin Tat	15	18
(England) Rowe	1	13
(Denmark) Kops	15	15
(Denmark) Bacher	4	12

Quarter-finals
(Denmark) Nielsen	15	12	18
(Thailand) Wattanasin	4	15	14
(Malaysia) Kin Tat	6	17	15
(Denmark) Kops	15	14	13

Semi-finals
(Denmark) Nielsen	15	15
(Malaysia) Kin Tat	13	11

=== Section 2 ===
Round of 32
(Denmark) Henning Borch	15	15
(Denmark) Bengt Nielsen	7	8
(Sweden) Olle Andersson	15	15
(England) David Horton	8	3
(Indonesia) Tan Joe Hok	14	15	15
(West Germany) Wolfgang Bochow	17	1	8
(Malaysia) Oon Chong Teik	15	15
(Denmark) Finn Kobberø	7	11
(Thailand) Channarong Ratanaseangsuang	15	15
(England) Colin Beacom	14	2
(Denmark) Jorgen Mortensen	15	15
(Denmark) Poul Erik Nielsen	6	9
(Malaysia) Ong Chong Jin	15	3	15
(Sweden) Berndt Dahlberg	2	15	8
(Republic of Ireland) Cyril Wilkinson	15	13	15
(Malaysia) R. T. Ponnampalam	10	15	7

Round of 16
(Denmark) Borch	15	15
(Sweden) Andersson	8	3
(Indonesia) Joe Hok	15	13	15
(Malaysia) Teik	5	15	2
(Thailand) Channarong	15	15
(Denmark) Mortensen	10	0
(Malaysia) Chong Jin	15	15
(Republic of Ireland) Wilkinson	3	2

Quarter-finals
(Denmark) Borch	15	6	15
(Indonesia) Joe Hok	12	15	8
(Thailand) Channarong	15	15
(Malaysia) Chong Jin	6	7

Semi-finals
(Denmark) Borch	15	15
(Thailand) Channarong	6	7

== Women's singles ==
=== Section 1 ===
Round of 32
(United States) Judy Hashman	11	11
(Sweden) Eva Pettersson	4	4
(Canada) Dorothy Tinline	12	5	11
(England) B. M. Parish	9	11	9
(Denmark) Karin Jørgensen	11	11
(New Zealand) Glenys Middelburg	7	8
(England) Phyllis Kirkwood	9	11	11
(England) Anita Price	12	9	7
(Indonesia) Minarni Soedaryanto	11	12
(Netherlands) Imre Rietveld	8	9
(Denmark) Lizbeth von Barnekow	11	11
(Denmark) Anette Rye	3	7
(England) Angela Bairstow	11	11
(Scotland) Muriel Ferguson	4	1
(Republic of Ireland) Sue Peard	12	4	11
(West Germany) Gerda Schumacher	9	11	6

Round of 16
(United States) Hashman	11	11
(Canada) Tinline	1	0
(Denmark) Jørgensen	11	11
(England) Kirkwood	6	4
(Indonesia) Minarni	11	12
(Denmark) von Barnekow	7	10
(England) Bairstow	11	11
(Republic of Ireland) Peard	3	9

Quarter-finals
(United States) Hashman	10	11	11
(Denmark) Jørgensen	12	3	3
(Indonesia) Minarni	11	11
(England) Bairstow	7	5

Semi-finals
(United States) Hashman	11	11
(Indonesia) Minarni	3	5

=== Section 2 ===
Round of 32
(England) Ursula Smith	11	11
(Indonesia) Retno Koestijah	4	0
(Canada) Marjorie Shedd	11	11
(England) Julie Charles	9	3
(Denmark) Ulla Rasmussen	11	4	11
(Sweden) Gunilla Dahlström	3	11	5
(England) Stephanie Jones	11	11
(England) Margaret Frost	5	2
(Republic of Ireland) Mary O'Sullivan	11	11
(England) S. J. Baldwin	5	7
(West Germany) Irmgard Latz	11	11
(England) Charlotte Lindsay	1	1
(Denmark) Pernille Mølgaard Hansen	11	11
(New Zealand) Sonya Cox	5	5
(England) Sheila Ryder	11	11
(England) A. H. Larman	5	9

Round of 16
(England) Smith	11	11
(Canada) Shedd	8	5
(Denmark) Rasmussen	11	11
(England) Jones	8	1
(Republic of Ireland) O'Sullivan	11	11
(West Germany) Latz	6	7
(Denmark) Mølgaard Hansen	11	11
(England) Ryder	8	7

Quarter-finals
(England) Smith	11	11
(Denmark) Rasmussen	7	5
(Republic of Ireland) O'Sullivan	11	11	12
(Denmark) Mølgaard Hansen	12	2	11

Semi-finals
(England) Smith	11	11
(Republic of Ireland) O'Sullivan	8	2
