= 1903 All England Badminton Championships =

1903 All England Championships
Tournament details
- Dates: 26 March 1903– 28 March 1903
- Edition: 5th
- Venue: London Rifle Brigade Drill Hall
- Location: 130 Bunhill Row, Islington, London
- Official website: All England Championships

The 1903 All England Championships was a badminton tournament held at the London Rifle Brigade Drill Hall in Islington, London, England from 26–28 March 1903.

In the men's singles Ralph Watling of Great Yarmouth successfully defended his title.

Meriel Lucas was unable to defend her singles and doubles titles due to a family illness. The women's singles and doubles consisted of only three rounds following a small number of entries. The women's singles only had five entries and this was attributed to the increase in younger players causing the older women not to enter.

== Final results ==
Category	Winners	Runners-up	Score
Men's singles	(England) Ralph Watling	(England) Henry Marrett	1-15, 18-17, 15-8
Women's singles	(England) Ethel Thomson	(England) Dorothea Douglass	18-15, 15-9
Men's doubles	(England) Stewart Massey & Edward Huson	(England) Sir George Thomas & Ralph Watling	15-10, 15-3
Women's doubles	(England) Mabel Hardy & Dorothea Douglas	(England) Ethel Thomson & Muriel Bateman	15-4, 15-9
Mixed doubles	(England) Sir George Thomas & Ethel Thomson	(England) Stewart Massey & Mrs Cammell	
Men's doubles handicap	(England) Percy Buckley & Herbert Mellersh (owe 6)	(England) George Vidal & Leonard Ransford (owe 6)	18-15, 6-15, 15-8
Women's doubles handicap	(England) E. M. Moseley & Dorothea Douglas (owe 15)	(England) Hazel Hogarth & M. Drake (scratch)	15-6, 8-15, 15-12
Mixed doubles handicap	(England) H. S. Venables & Dorothea Douglas	(England) S. R. Arthur & Edith Johnson	

== Men's singles ==
First round
(England) Ralph Watling (Great Yarmouth	15	15
(England) A. B. Clifton (Chelsea)	1	6
(England) Hamer (Southport)	15	15
(England) Browne	2	3
(England) S. R. Arthur (Guildford)
bye
(England) Birdie (Guildford)
bye
(England) E. Young (Blackheath)
bye
(England) Snell (Blackheath)
bye
(England) W. Redshaw (Willesden)
bye
(England) Edward Hawthorn (Willesden)
bye
(England) Henry Marrett (Crystal Palace)	11	15	15
(England) Leonard Ransford (Crystal Palace)	15	7	11
(England) Edward Huson (Ealing)	15	15
(England) Triscott (Blackheath)	1	6
(England) J. H. Colin Prior (Guildford)
bye
(England) E. A. Short (Guildford)
bye
(England) Norman Wood (Brinscall)
bye
(England) F. S. Collier (Guildford)
bye
(England) George Thomas (Southsea)
bye
(England) R. Franck
bye

Second round
(England) Watling	15	15
(England) Hamer	12	12
(England) Arthur	15	15
(England) Birdie	10	3
(England) Young	15	15
(England) Snell	9	7
(England) Redshaw	15	15
(England) Hawthorn	8	12
(England) Marrett	15	15
(England) Huson	9	5
(England) Prior	3	15	15
(England) Short	15	11	5
(England) Wood	15	11	15
(England) Collier	2	15	8
(England) Thomas	15	15
(England) Franck	3	4

Quarter-finals
(England) Watling	15	15
(England) Arthur	4	4
(England) Young	15	15
(England) Redshaw	10	7
(England) Marrett	15	15
(England) Prior	3	2
(England) Wood	15	6	15
(England) Thomas	6	15	11

Semi-finals
(England) Watling	15	18
(England) Young	7	13
(England) Marrett	15	9	15
(England) Wood	6	15	7

Final
(England) Watling	1	18	15
(England) Marrett	15	17	8

== Women's singles ==
First round
(England) Miss Ethel Thomson (Budleigh Salterton)
bye
(England) Miss Mabel Hardy (Crystal Palace)	15	15
(England) Miss Ellen Stawell-Brown (Surbiton)	6	9
(England) Miss Dorothea Douglass (Ealing)
bye
(England) Miss Edith Johnson (Surbiton)
bye

Semi-finals
(England) Thomson	15	15
(England) Hardy	9	3
(England) Douglass	15	15
(England) Johnson	4	6

Final
(England) Thomson	18	15
(England) Douglass	15	9

== Men's doubles ==
First round
(England) Stewart Massey & Edward Huson (Ealing)	9	15	15
(England) Robert Ransford & Leonard Ransford (Crystal Palace)	15	10	6
(England) Atkinson & Ward (Ravenscourt)
bye
(England) Percy Buckley & F. S. Collier (Guildford)	15	15
(Republic of Ireland) C. P. R. James (Dundrum) & (England) Snell (Blackheath)	6	2
(England) L. Hanson & Col. Ian Campbell (Crystal Palace)
bye
(England) Ralph Watling (Crystal Palace) & Georg Thomas (Southsea)	15	15
(England) Saunders & Raoul du Roveray	4	7
(England) E. Young (Blackheath) & S. R. Arthur (Guildford)	15	15
(England) D. H. MacDougall & Frank Abbatt	2	12
(England) Edward St.John & E. P. Harrison (Ealing)	15	15
(England) A. B. Clifton (Chelsea) & Thomas Denny-Cooke Richmond)	7	6
(England) C. A. Turner (Cheltenham) & Albert Prebble (Crystal Palace)	15	15
(England) Hamer (Southport) & Brown	6	8

Quarter-finals
(England) Massey & Huson	15	15
(England) Atkinson & Ward	8	7
(England) Buckley & Collier	15	15
(England) Hanson & Campbell	8	10
(England) Watling & Thomas	17	15
(England) Young & Arthur	14	9
(England) St. John & Harrison	15	15
(England) Turner & Prebble	11	8

Semi-finals
(England) Massey & Huson	15	18
(England) Buckley & Collier	5	17
(England) Watling & Thomas	17	15
(England) St. John & Harrison	14	9

Final
(England) Massey & Huson	15	15
(England) Watling & Thomas	10	3

== Women's doubles ==
First round
(England) Miss Mabel Hardy (Crystal Palace) & Miss Dorothea Douglass (Ealing)	15	9	15
(England) Miss E. M. Moseley & Miss Daisy St. John (Ealing)	5	15	11
(England) Miss Hazel Hogarth (Cheltenham) & Miss Drake (Bognor)
bye
(England) Miss Ethel Thomson (Budleigh Salterton) & Miss Muriel Bateman (Ealing)	8	15	15
(England) Miss Ellen Stawell-Brown & Miss Edith Johnson (Surbiton)	15	11	7
(England) Miss Margaret Larminie (Teddington) & Miss Bradford (Ealing)	15	15
(England) Miss Freeland & Mrs Turner (Camberley)	11	4

Semi-finals
(England) Hardy & Douglass	15	15
(England) Hogarth & Drake	13	10
(England) Thomson & Bateman	15	17	15
(England) Larminie & Bradford	5	18	6

Final
(England) Hardy & Douglass	15	15
(England) Thomson & Bateman	4	9

== Mixed doubles ==
First round
(England) George Thomas (Southsea) & Ethel Thomson (Budleigh Salterton)
(England) Leonard Ransford (Crystal Palace) & E. M. Moseley (Ealing)
(England) Stewart Massey & Mrs Cammell (Ealing)
(England) C. A. Turner & Hazel Hogarth (Cheltenham)

Quarter-finals
(England) Thomas & Thomson
(England) Ransford & Moseley
(England) Massey & Cammell
(England) Turner & Hogarth

Semi-finals
(England) Thomas & Thomson
(England) Ransford & Moseley
(England) Massey & Cammell
(England) Turner & Hogarth

Final
(England) Thomas & Thomson
(England) Massey & Cammell
