= Marje Henderson =

English badminton player

Personal information
- Born: Third quarter 1905 Portsmouth
- Died: 2000 (aged 95)

Sport
- Country: England
- Sport: Badminton

Kathleen Marjorie Henderson (née Bell), known as Marje (1905–2000) was an English international badminton player.

== Badminton career ==
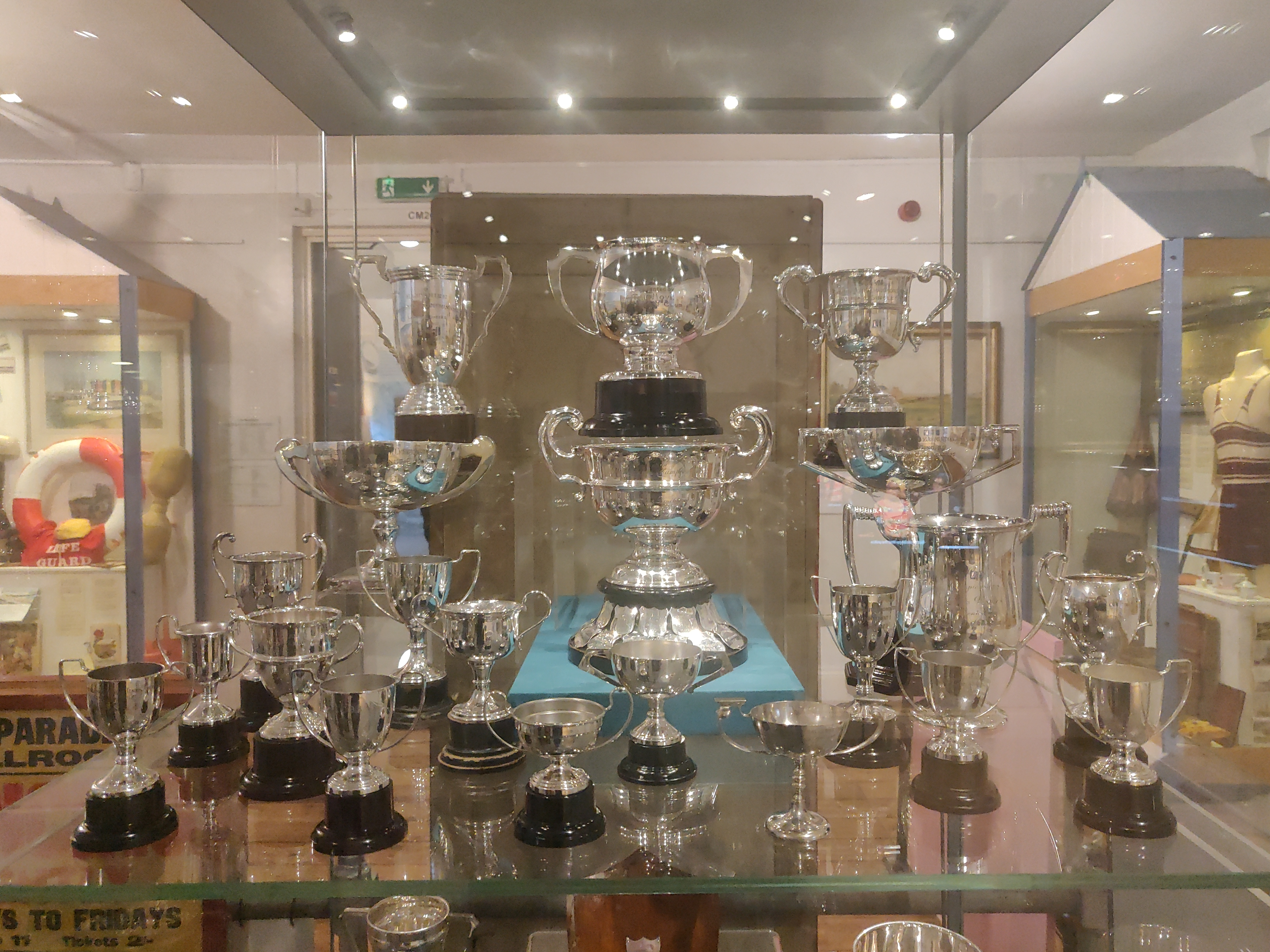
Some of the many trophies won by Henderson, now at Portsmouth Museum and Art Gallery

Henderson born in 1905 was a four times winner of the All England Open Badminton Championships. She won four consecutive women's doubles with Thelma Kingsbury from 1933 to 1936. The first success was in her maiden name of Bell.

In addition she won the Scottish Open in 1935, 1936 and 1937.

After marrying James Henderson in 1933 she played under her married name.

== Legacy ==
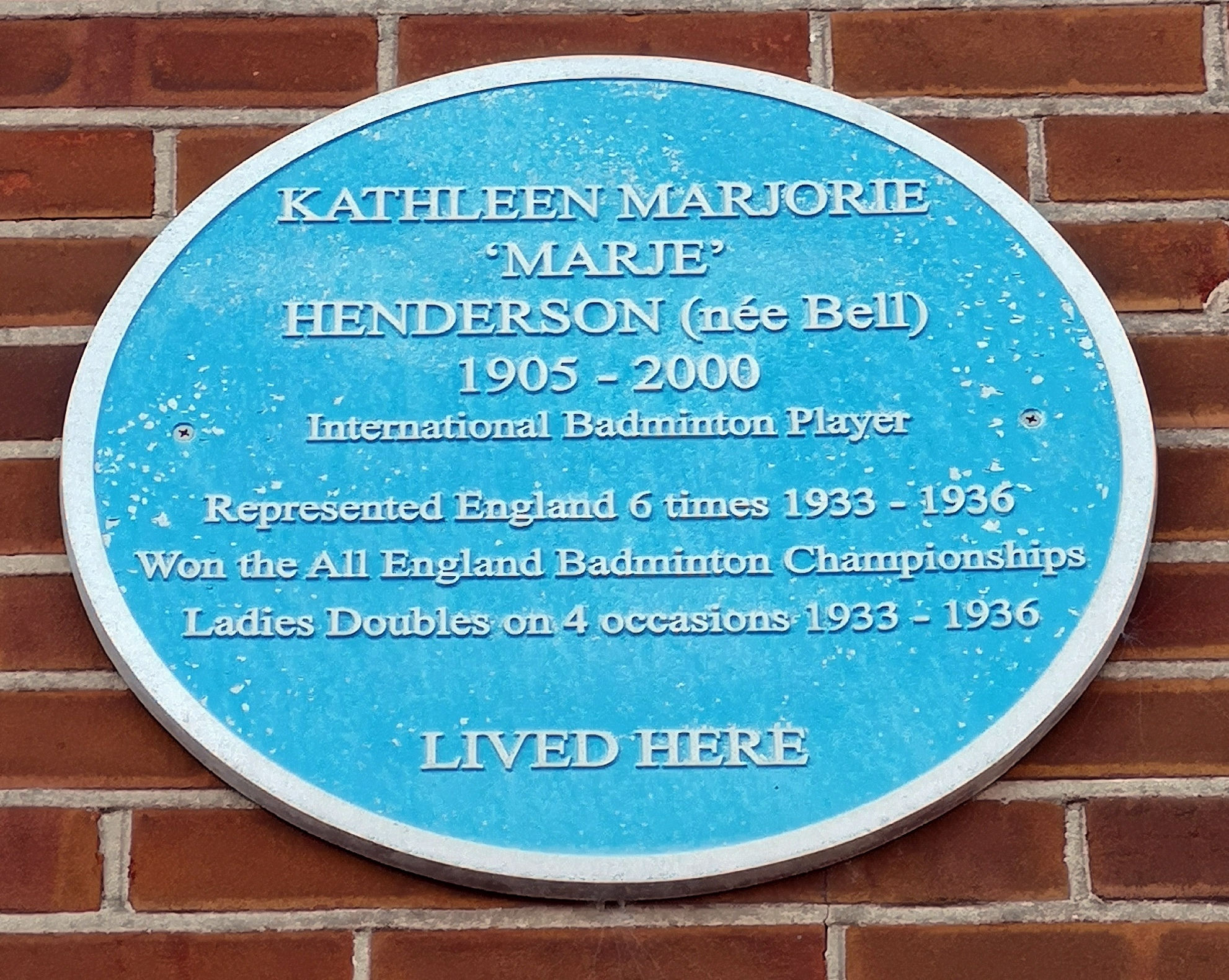
Plaque for Kathleen Marjorie 'Marje' Henderson

A plaque commemorates her achievements in her home town of Portsmouth and Henderson claimed that she was the first woman in international badminton to wear shorts.

== Achievements ==
=== International tournaments (7 titles, 3 runners-up) ===
Women's doubles
Year	Tournament	Partner	Opponent	Score	Result
1933	All England Open	(England) Thelma Kingsbury	(Wales) L. W. Myers (England) Brenda Speaight	10–15, 15–11, 15–9	(gold) Winner
1934	Irish Open	(England) Thelma Kingsbury	(England) Marian Horsley (England) Betty Uber	6–15, 10–15	(silver) Runner-up
1934	All England Open	(England) Thelma Kingsbury	(Wales) L. W. Myers (England) Brenda Speaight	15–8, 15–5	(gold) Winner
1935	Scottish Open	(England) Thelma Kingsbury	(Scotland) C. T. Duncan (England) Betty Uber	17–14, 15–12	(gold) Winner
1935	All England Open	(England) Thelma Kingsbury	(England) Diana Doveton (England) Betty Uber	15–5, 9–15, 15–8	(gold) Winner
1936	Scottish Open	(England) Thelma Kingsbury	(Scotland) Elizabeth Anderson (Scotland) E. W. Greenwood	15–11, 15–6	(gold) Winner
1936	All England Open	(England) Thelma Kingsbury	(England) Diana Doveton (England) Betty Uber	15–10, 5–15, 15–7	(gold) Winner
1937	Scottish Open	(England) Thelma Kingsbury	(Scotland) Elizabeth Anderson (Scotland) M. K. Morton	15–6, 15–11	(gold) Winner
1937	All England Open	(England) Thelma Kingsbury	(England) Diana Doveton (England) Betty Uber	18–17, 1–15, 2–15	(silver) Runner-up
1938	All England Open	(England) Marian Horsley	(England) Diana Doveton (England) Betty Uber	6–15, 1–15	(silver) Runner-up
