= 1938 All England Badminton Championships =

Tournament information
- Sport: Badminton
- Location: Royal Horticultural Halls, Westminster, England, United Kingdom
- Dates: February 28–March 6, 1938
- Established: 1899
- Website: All England Championships

The 1938 All England Championships was a badminton tournament held at the Royal Horticultural Halls, Westminster, England from February 28 to March 6, 1938.

== Final results ==
Category	Winners	Runners-up	Score
Men's singles	(England) Ralph Nichols	(Denmark) Jesper Bie	15–4, 15–5
Women's singles	(England) Daphne Young	(England) Betty Uber	10-12, 12–11, 11-3
Men's doubles	(England) Ralph Nichols & Leslie Nichols	(England) Raymond White & (Republic of Ireland) Ian Maconachie	15-12, 7-15, 15-9
Women's doubles	(England) Betty Uber & Diana Doveton	(England) Marian Horsley & Marje Henderson	15–6, 15–1
Mixed doubles	(England) Raymond White & Betty Uber	(England) Ralph Nichols & Bessie Staples	15-10, 15-9

=== Results ===
==== Men's singles ====
Third round
(England) Ralph Nichols	15	15
(Sweden) B Persson	1	7
(Malayan Union) Ong Hock Sim	15	15
(Denmark) Carl Frohlke	9	9
(England) Tom Wingfield	12	15	15
(England) H E Baldwin	15	11	7
(Denmark) E Christensen	3	15	15
(England) Thomas P. Dick	15	5	7
(Denmark) Jesper Bie	9	15	15
(England) Leslie Nichols	15	5	8
(England) C H Whittaker	15	15
(Denmark) Jan Schmidt	10	12
(Denmark) Tage Madsen	15	15
(England) A C Miller	5	7
(England) Raymond White	15	15
(England) R V M Messenger	11	8

Quarterfinals
(England) Nichols	15	15
(Malayan Union) Ong	11	4
(England) Wingfield	15	15
(Denmark) Christensen	6	6
(Denmark) Bie	15	15	15
(England) Whittaker	11	18	7
(Denmark) Madsen	13	15	18
(England) White	15	9	14

Semifinals
(England) Nichols	15	15
(England) Wingfield	7	7
(Denmark) Bie	15	8	15
(Denmark) Madsen	5	15	8

Final
(England) Nichols	15	15
(Denmark) Bie	4	5

==== Women's singles ====
Second round
(England) Daphne Young	11	11
(England) R Scourfield-Evans	1	6
(Denmark) E Lindholm	5	11	11
(Canada) P Radford	11	5	6
(England) Queenie Allen	11	11
(England) F Mercer	3	3
(England) M A Mills	11	11
(England) C H Duringer	4	0
(England) Betty Uber	11	11
(England) A Y Richardson	0	4
(England) Mavis Green	w/o
(England) Marje Henderson
(Denmark) Tonny Olsen	7	11	11
(England) C D Newitt	11	5	5
(England) D A Duff	w/o
(England) Diana Doveton

Quarterfinals
(England) Young	12	11
(Denmark) Lindholm	10	2
(England) Allen	12	11
(England) Mills	9	2
(England) Uber	6	11	11
(England) Green	11	1	1
(Denmark) Olsen	11	11
(England) Duff	1	0

Semifinals
(England) Young	11	11
(England) Allen	5	4
(England) Uber	11	7	11
(Denmark) Olsen	8	11	8

Final
(England) Young	10	12	11
(England) Uber	12	11	3
