= Heather Ward =

English badminton player

Heather Ward (married name Heather Nielsen)
Personal information
- Born: October 1938 (age 88) Surrey

Sport
- Country: England
- Sport: Badminton
Medal record
Representing ENG
All England Open Badminton Championships
| Gold medal – first place | 1958 London | doubles |
| Gold medal – first place | 1959 London | singles |

Heather Maureen Ward (later Heather Nielsen; born October 1938) is a former English badminton player who won international championships and competed at an elite level during a two decade span from the mid-1950s to the mid-1970s.

== Biography ==
Noted for her grace and athleticism, she won women's doubles with American Margaret Varner at the 1958 All England Badminton Championships (then the world's most prestigious tournament for individual competitors). The following year Ward interrupted the reign of the great Judy Devlin (Hashman) by defeating her in the 1959 All England Badminton Championships women's singles final. During the 1960s her badminton career was hampered by a variety of factors including athletic injury, marriage and motherhood, and residence in South Africa. In 1970, however, she returned to the 1970 All England Badminton Championships to reach the final of women's singles before bowing to Japan's Etsuko Takenaka. Continuing to compete, she was an All-England singles quarter-finalist as late as 1975.

She married Egon Nielsen and they had four children Bjorn, Gorm, Belinda and Anders Nielsen.

== Achievements ==
=== International tournaments (11 titles, 10 runners-up) ===
Women's singles
| Year | Tournament | Opponent | Score | Result |
|---|---|---|---|---|
| 1956 | Scottish Open | (England) Iris Rogers | 11–6, 4–11, 5–11 | (silver) Runner-up |
| 1957 | Irish Open | (England) Iris Rogers | 9–12, 12–11, 1–11 | (silver) Runner-up |
| 1958 | Scottish Open | (England) Iris Rogers | 6–11, 11–3, 11–4 | (gold) Winner |
| 1958 | Welsh International | (England) P. E. Broad | 11–1, 11–4 | (gold) Winner |
| 1959 | Irish Open | (England) Iris Rogers | 11–4, 11–8 | (gold) Winner |
| 1959 | All England Open | (United States) Judy Devlin | 11–7, 3–11, 11–4 | (gold) Winner |
| 1966 | Dutch Open | (England) Angela Bairstow | 7–11, 11–8, 5–11 | (silver) Runner-up |
| 1970 | All England Open | (Japan) Etsuko Takenaka | 3–11, 4–11 | (silver) Runner-up |

Women's doubles
| Year | Tournament | Partner | Opponent | Score | Result |
|---|---|---|---|---|---|
| 1956 | Scottish Open | (England) M. Crockett | (England) Iris Rogers (England) June Timperley | 7–15, 3–15 | (silver) Runner-up |
| 1957 | Irish Open | (England) Barbara Carpenter | (England) Iris Rogers (England) June Timperley | 13–18, 15–11, 2–15 | (silver) Runner-up |
| 1957 | Swedish Open | (Denmark) Hanne Roest | (England) Iris Rogers (England) June Timperley | 2–15, 7–15 | (silver) Runner-up |
| 1958 | Scottish Open | (England) Barbara Carpenter | (England) Iris Rogers (England) June Timperley | 13–15, 7–15 | (silver) Runner-up |
| 1958 | All England Open | (United States) Margaret Varner Bloss | (England) Iris Rogers (England) June Timperley | 15–12, 15–2 | (gold) Winner |
| 1958 | Welsh International | (England) P. E. Broad | (England) B. Maxwell (England) J. Davidson | 15–5, 15–6 | (gold) Winner |
| 1959 | Irish Open | (England) Barbara Carpenter | (England) Iris Rogers (England) June Timperley | 6–15, 5–15 | (silver) Runner-up |
| 1959 | Belgian International | (England) Barbara Carpenter | (Denmark) Tonny Holst-Christensen (Denmark) Inger Kjærgaard | 15–8, 15–9 | (gold) Winner |
| 1966 | Denmark Open | (Netherlands) Imre Rietveld | (Denmark) Karin Jørgensen (Denmark) Ulla Strand | 4–15, 12–15 | (silver) Runner-up |
| 1966 | Dutch Open | (England) Jenny Horton | (Netherlands) Agnes Geene (Netherlands) Imre Rietveld | 17–14, 15–3 | (gold) Winner |
| 1974 | Swedish Open | (England) Barbara Giles | (West Germany) Brigitte Steden (West Germany) Marieluise Wackerow | 6–15, 15–13, 15–10 | (gold) Winner |

Mixed doubles
| Year | Tournament | Partner | Opponent | Score | Result |
|---|---|---|---|---|---|
| 1958 | Welsh International | (England) Hugh Findlay | (England) Tony Jordan (England) P. E. Broad | 15–11, 15–7 | (gold) Winner |
| 1959 | Belgian International | (England) Hugh Findlay | (England) Ronald Lockwood (England) Barbara Carpenter | 15–11, 15–11 | (gold) Winner |
