= Violet Baddeley =

Personal information
- Born: 22 February 1902 Kensington, London
- Died: January 1989 (aged 86) Hampshire

Sport
- Country: England
- Sport: Badminton

Violet Maude Baddeley married name Violet Engelbach (1902-1989) was an English international badminton player.

== Badminton career ==
Baddeley twice reached the final of the All England Open Badminton Championships. In 1922 she reached the final partnering A. M. Head and in 1927 she reached the final with D. Myers.

== Family ==
She was the daughter of the famous tennis player Herbert Baddeley. In 1930 she married fellow badminton player Archibald Engelbach.

She remarried and died in 1989 as Violet Maude Thompson.
