= Edward Huson =

English badminton player

Personal information
- Born: 1881 Mumbai
- Died: 1951 (aged 69–70) Taunton

Sport
- Country: England
- Sport: Badminton

Edward Louis Huson (1881-1951), was a male badminton player from England.

== Badminton career ==
Huson born in India was a winner of the All England Open Badminton Championships. He won the 1903 doubles with Stewart Marsden Massey.
