= Lavinia Radeglia =

English badminton and tennis player

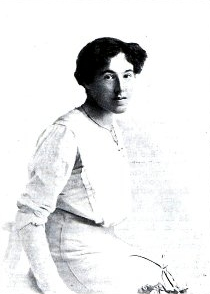
- Radeglia

Personal information
- Born: 13 May 1879
- Died: 11 November 1947 (aged 68)

Sport
- Country: England
- Sport: Badminton

Lavinia Clara Radeglia (1879 in Kensington – 1947 in Budleigh Salterton) was an English badminton and tennis player. She first played badminton in 1903 at the Richmond Badminton Club. She became an England international in 1909 and won four All England titles. She was a one time editor of the Badminton Gazette and a well known Lawn Tennis player and became a professional tennis coach.

== Medal Record at the All England Badminton Championships ==
Medal	Year	Event
Gold medal – first place	1913	Women's singles
Gold medal – first place	1914	Women's singles
Gold medal – first place	1920	Women's doubles
Gold medal – first place	1923	Women's singles
