= Archibald Engelbach =

English badminton player

Archibald Englebach
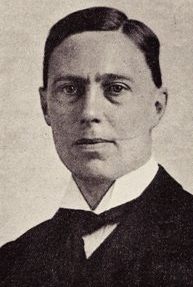
- English badminton player (c 1920)

Personal information
- Born: 1 January 1881 Surrey, England
- Died: 14 December 1961 (aged 80) London, England

Sport
- Country: England
- Sport: Badminton

Archibald Frank Engelbach (1 January 1881 – 14 December 1961) was an English badminton player. He competed in the All England Badminton Championships, winning the men's doubles title in 1920 under the alias A. Fee. He was a schools gymnastic champion before taking up badminton and became a prominent badminton judge. This resulted in him being uncapped for the England team. In 1930 he married Violet Baddeley, also a well known badminton player, daughter of Herbert Baddeley, the four-time winner of the Wimbledon doubles. He died in December 1961 at his home in London aged 80.

== Medal record at the All England Badminton Championships ==
Medal	Year	Event
Gold medal – first place	1920	Men's doubles
Silver medal – second place	1922	Men's doubles
