= Raoul du Roveray =

English badminton player

Personal information
- Born: Second Quarter 1879 Brentford
- Died: July 1940 Brentford

Sport
- Country: England
- Sport: Badminton

Raoul Louis du Roveray (1879–1940), was a male badminton player from England.

== Badminton career ==
Du Roveray born in Brentford was a winner of the All England Open Badminton Championships. He won the 1920 doubles with Archibald Engelbach.

He gained his England caps while playing for Middlesex.
