= Ian Maconachie =

Irish badminton player

Sport
- Country: (Republic of Ireland)
- Sport: Badminton

Ian Maconachie was an Irish badminton player. He represented Ireland in the national team and competed in many All England Championships with the highlight being the 1937 mixed doubles winner together with Thelma Kingsbury.

== Medal Record at the All England Badminton Championships ==
Medal	Year	Event
Silver medal – second place	1934	Mixed doubles
Silver medal – second place	1936	Mixed doubles
Gold medal – first place	1937	Mixed doubles
Silver medal – second place	1938	Men's doubles
