= Frank Hodge =

English badminton player

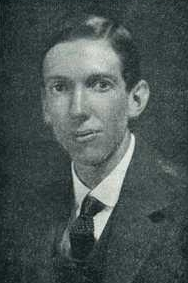
- Image of Frank Hodge, English badminton player

Personal information
- Born: 18 May 1894 Ham, Surrey
- Died: 15 May 1957 (aged 62) Barnet, London

Sport
- Country: England
- Sport: Badminton

Francis Percy Hodge known as Frank Hodge was an English badminton player. After serving with distinction during the First World War, he returned to playing badminton in 1919. A left-handed player, he was capped 18 times by England between 1919 and 1933. He won three All England titles.

In 1934, he married Molly Kathleen Clara Drake, another member of the Alexandra Palace Badminton Club. He died in 1957.

== Medal Record at the All England Badminton Championships ==
Medal	Year	Event
Gold medal – first place	1921	Men's doubles
Gold medal – first place	1924	Men's doubles
Gold medal – first place	1928	Men's doubles
