= Thomas Boyle (badminton) =

Irish badminton player

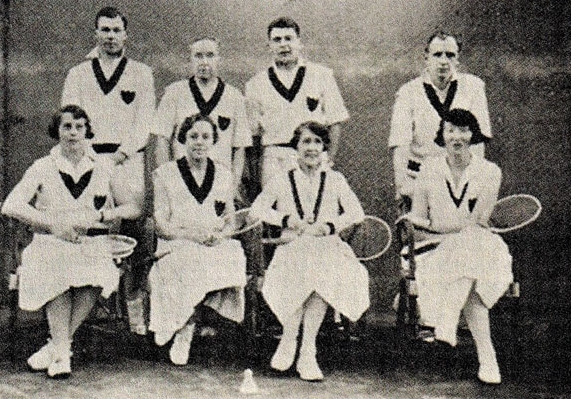
- Strollers 1927

Sport
- Country: (Republic of Ireland) Ireland
- Sport: Badminton

Thomas H Boyle was a male badminton player from Ireland.

== Profile ==
Thomas Boyle won the All England Open Badminton Championships, considered as the unofficial World Badminton Championships, in the men's doubles with James Rankin in 1939.

He also won six Irish Open titles.
