= Poul Erik Nielsen =

Danish rower

Personal information
- Nationality: Danish
- Born: 5 June 1942 (age 82); Odense, Denmark

Sport
- Sport: Rowing

Poul Erik Nielsen (born 5 June 1942) is a Danish rower. He competed in the men's coxed four event at the 1964 Summer Olympics.
