= Henry Robert Charles Martin =

Henry Martin
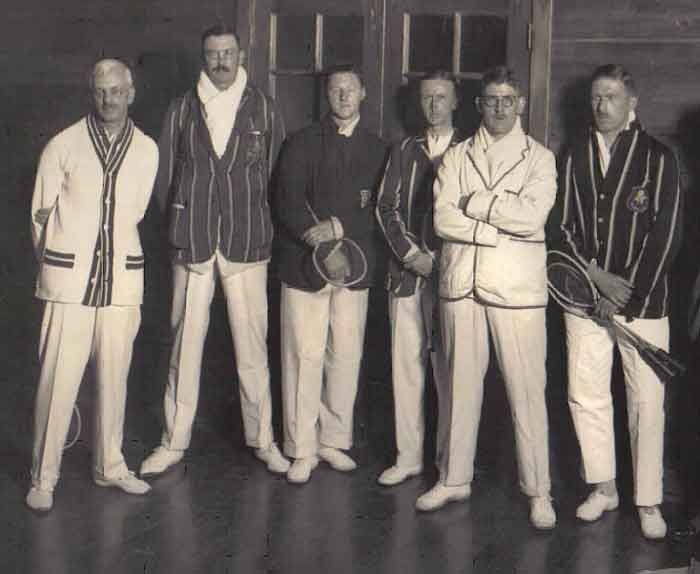

Personal information
- Born: 1889 Maskeliya, Ceylon
- Died: 1942 (aged 52–53)

Sport
- Country: England
- Sport: Badminton

Henry Robert Charles Martin (1889 – 1942) was a long-serving officer of arms at the College of Arms in London and a male English international badminton player.

== Profile ==
Born at Maskeliya, Ceylon, the eldest son of Henry Thomas Martin, later of South Kensington, Martin was educated at Bedford School, then at Lincoln College, Oxford. He was called to the bar from the Middle Temple in 1912. He represented England as a badminton player. During the First World War, he served as a captain in the East Lancashire Regiment, and in the Intelligence Department from 1938-41. His first heraldic appointment came on 31 May 1922 when he was made Rouge Croix Pursuivant of Arms in Ordinary to replace Archibald George Blomefield Russell. He held this position until 2 August 1928 when he was promoted to the office of Richmond Herald of Arms in Ordinary to replace Gerald Wollaston. Martin was elected a Fellow of the Society of Antiquaries in 1930. He held this office until his death from heart failure on 23 July 1942.

In 1914, Martin had married Mary Gladys, daughter of the Rev. John Whitby St Quintin, M.A., rector of Hatley St George, Cambridge; they had three daughters: Diana, Pamela (who married, in 1936, John Maitland Cowper, of Barclays Bank), and June.

== Badminton career ==
He was part of the English team that toured Canada in 1925 to promote the sport on behalf of the Canadian Badminton Association which had recently been formed in 1921. He lived in Earls Terrace London at the time.

== Arms ==
Coat of arms of Henry Robert Charles Martin
Notes Granted in 1926 Crest From an Eastern crown Or a horse's head Sable mane Or charged on the neck with a scallop Or. Escutcheon Argent 2 bars & 6 escallops in orle Gules. Motto Mediocria Maxima Badge A scallop reversed Gules charged with a martlet Or.

== See also ==
- Heraldry
- Pursuivant
- Herald
