= James Rankin (badminton) =

Irish badminton player

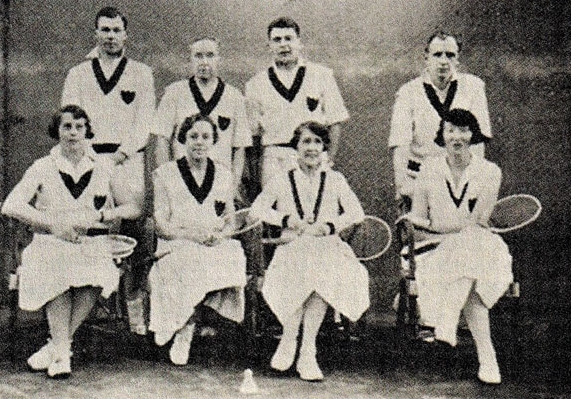
- Strollers in 1927

Sport
- Country: (Republic of Ireland) Ireland
- Sport: Badminton

James L Rankin was a male badminton player from Ireland.

== Profile ==
Rankin won the All England Open Badminton Championships, considered as the unofficial World Badminton Championships, in the men's doubles with Thomas Boyle in 1939.

He also won ten Irish Open titles.
