= Oon brothers =

Malaysian badminton players

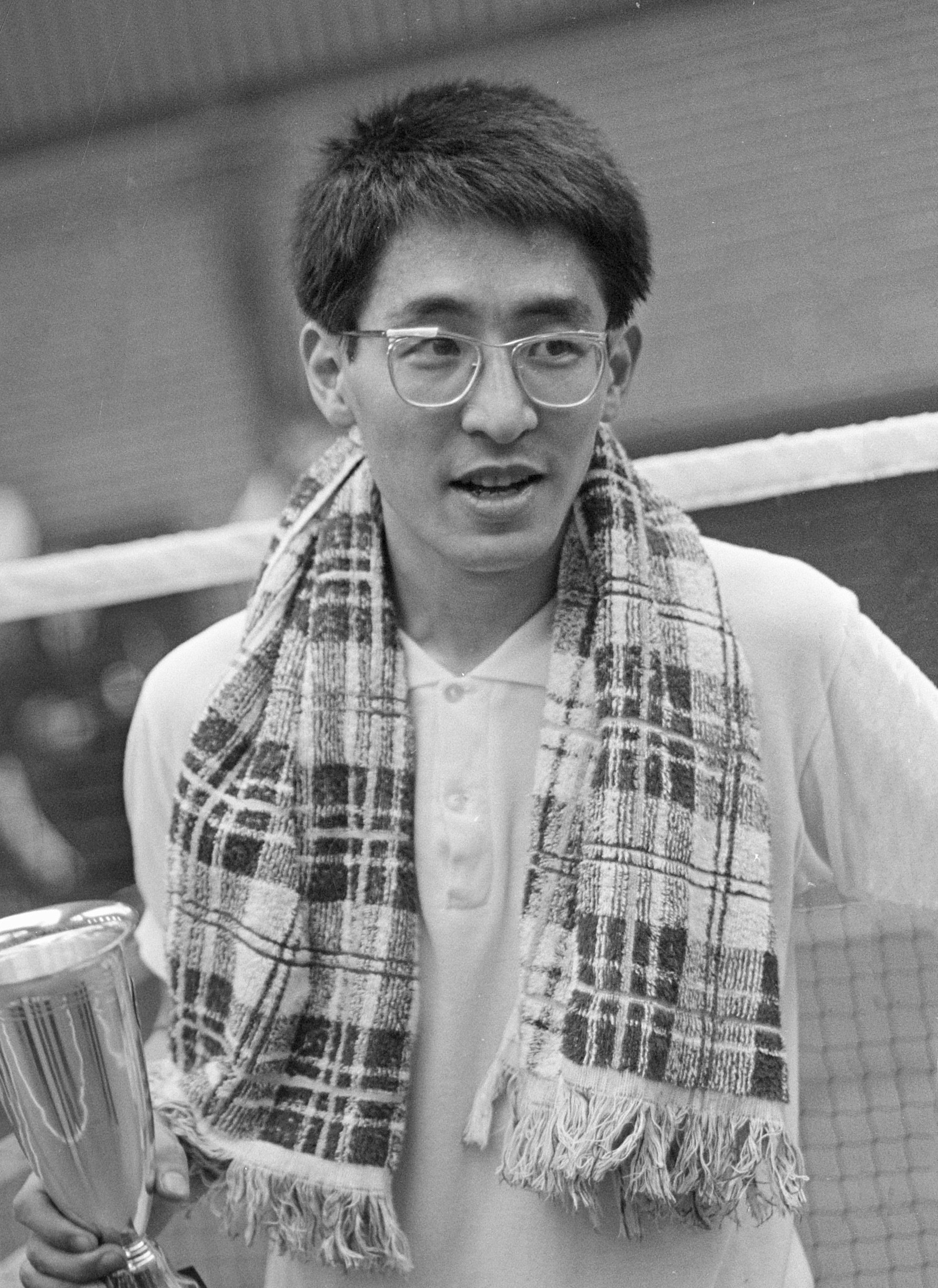
Oon Chong Hau in the Netherlands in 1969

The Oon brothers, Oon Chong Teik (温忠德), Oon Chong Jin (温忠哲) and Oon Chong Hau (温忠豪), were badminton playing siblings from Malaysia, each of whom won a variety of international titles while studying toward a medical degree in England. The eldest of the three, Chong Teik, was twice a singles semifinalist (1961, 1962) at the All-England Championships which was then the world's most prestigious tournament for individual players. Chong Jin, the "middle brother," was an All-England singles semifinalist in 1960, and a men's doubles finalist with Danish great Erland Kops in 1965. Chong Hau, the youngest brother by several years, captured the English Junior singles title a record four times. He reached the All-England singles semifinal in 1969, losing to the legendary Rudy Hartono. From the late 1950s through the late 1960s the brothers, collectively, won both men's singles and men's doubles in the open championships of Belgium, France, Ireland, the Netherlands, and Scotland. They captured men's singles and mixed doubles in the Welsh Open Championships. In part because they resided abroad during their badminton primes, none of the brothers represented Malaysia in Thomas Cup (world men's team) competition.
