= Gordon 'Curly' Mack =

Irish badminton player (1898–1948)

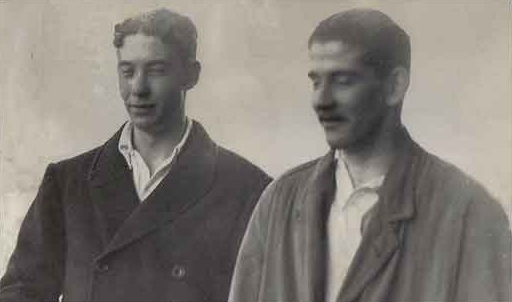

Personal information
- Born: 13 May 1898 Dublin, Ireland
- Died: February 1948 (aged 49) Montreal, Canada

Sport
- Country: (Republic of Ireland) Ireland
- Sport: Badminton

Gordon Sylvester Bradshaw Mack (known as Curly Mack) (13 May 1898 – February 1948) was a badminton player from Ireland.

== Career ==
Mack won the All England Open Badminton Championships, considered as the unofficial World Badminton Championships, in men's singles in 1930. In total, he won eight All England Open Badminton Championships titles between 1923 and 1931, six of them in men's doubles, one in men's singles and one in mixed doubles.

Mack also won twelve Irish Open titles.
