= William Mather Swinden =

English badminton player

William Swinden
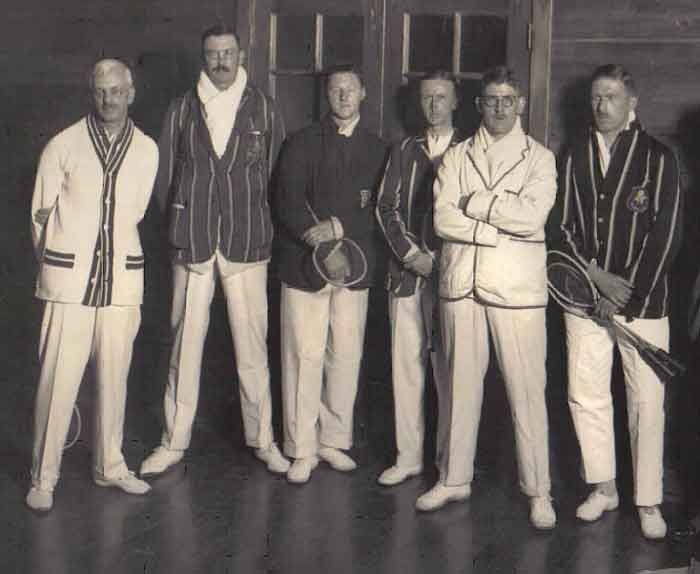

Personal information
- Born: 26 July 1886 Brooklands (Greater Manchester)
- Died: Q3, 1964 (aged 77) Worthing, Sussex

Sport
- Country: England
- Sport: Badminton

William Mather Swinden (1886-1964), was a male English international badminton player.

== Badminton career ==
Swinden born in Cheshire was a winner of the 1923 Scottish Open and runner-up in the All England Open Badminton Championships.

He was part of the English team that toured Canada in 1925 to promote the sport on behalf of the Canadian Badminton Association which had recently been formed in 1921.
