= Frank Devlin =

Irish badminton player (1900–1988)

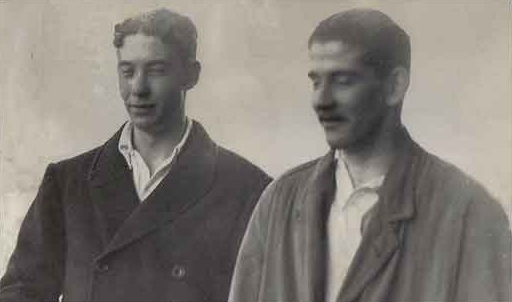

Personal information
- Born: 19 January 1900 Dublin, Ireland
- Died: 27 October 1988 (aged 88)

Sport
- Country: Ireland
- Sport: Badminton
- Handedness: Right

Joseph Francis Devlin (19 January 1900 – 27 October 1988) was an Irish badminton player.

== Badminton career ==
Devlin is the second most successful player ever in the All England Open Badminton Championships with 18 titles between 1925 and 1931, including three triple championships in 1926, 1927 and 1929. He also won four Irish Championships.

Despite being Irish he was part of the English team that toured Canada in 1925 to promote the sport on behalf of the Canadian Badminton Association which had recently been formed in 1921. He was living in Beckenham, Kent and worked as a Salesman. He was also part of a second English touring team that visited Canada during 1930. A match was held at the Granite Club in Toronto which England won 7–2.

== Personal life ==
Devlin's daughters, Susan Devlin and Judy Devlin, were also very successful badminton players.

== Awards ==
Frank Devlin was a right-handed player, and was included in the Badminton Hall of Fame in 1997, together with his daughter Judy Devlin.

== Major achievements ==
| Rank | Event | Date | Venue |
|---|---|---|---|
| 1; 1; 1 | Men's singles Men's doubles Mixed doubles | 1925, 1926, 1927, 1928, 1929, 1931; 1922, 1923, 1926, 1927, 1929, 1930, 1931; 1924, 1925, 1926, 1927, 1929 | All England Open |
| 1; 1; 1 | Men's singles Men's doubles Mixed doubles | 1924, 1926; 1921; 1923 | Irish Championships |
