= 2001 IBF World Championships – Men's doubles =

Men's doubles at the 2001 IBF World Championships
- Venue: Palacio de Deportes de San Pablo
- Location: Seville, Spain
- Dates: June 3, 2001 – June 10, 2001

Medalists
gold medal	Tony Gunawan; Halim Haryanto	Indonesia
silver medal	Ha Tae-kwon; Kim Dong-moon	South Korea
bronze medal	Chew Choon Eng; Chan Chong Ming	Malaysia
bronze medal	Choong Tan Fook; Lee Wan Wah	Malaysia

The 2001 IBF World Championships, also known as the World Badminton Championships, were held in the Palacio de Deportes de San Pablo, Seville, Spain, between 3 June and 10 June 2001. Following the results in the men's doubles.

== Main stage ==
=== Section 1 ===
First round
(Indonesia) Tony Gunawan (Indonesia) Halim Haryanto	15	15
(Japan) Yuzo Kubota (Japan) Shinya Ohtsuka	3	4
(England) James Anderson (England) Graham Hurrell	15	15
(Germany) Kristof Hopp (Germany) Thomas Tesche	13	13
(China) Chen Qiqiu (China) Liu Yong	15	15
(Scotland) Alastair Gatt (Scotland) Craig Robertson	9	6
(China) Deng Chuanhai (China) Sang Yang	16	15	15
(South Korea) Chung Jae Sung (South Korea) Lee Jae Jin	17	7	9
(South Korea) Lee Dong-soo (South Korea) Yoo Yong-sung	15	15
(Netherlands) Dennis Lens (Netherlands) Quinten van Dalm	7	13
(France) Bertrand Gallet (France) Jean-Michel Lefort	15	12	15
(Wales) Chris Davies (Wales) Matthew Hughes	8	15	12
(Denmark) Jens Eriksen (Denmark) Jesper Larsen	15	15
(Germany) Jochen Cassel (Germany) Mike Joppien	4	2
(Spain) José Antonio Crespo (Spain) Sergio Llopis	15	15
(Slovakia) Pavol Mecar (Slovakia) Marian Sulko	2	2

Second round
(Indonesia) Tony Gunawan (Indonesia) Halim Haryanto	8	15	15
(England) James Anderson (England) Graham Hurrell	15	7	7
(China) Chen Qiqiu (China) Liu Yong	15	15
(China) Deng Chuanhai (China) Sang Yang	6	3
(South Korea) Lee Dong-soo (South Korea) Yoo Yong-sung	15	15
(France) Bertrand Gallet (France) Jean-Michel Lefort	2	6
(Denmark) Jens Eriksen (Denmark) Jesper Larsen	7	15	15
(Spain) José Antonio Crespo (Spain) Sergio Llopis	15	6	2

Third round
(Indonesia) Tony Gunawan (Indonesia) Halim Haryanto	15	15
(China) Chen Qiqiu (China) Liu Yong	13	5
(South Korea) Lee Dong-soo (South Korea) Yoo Yong-sung	15	15
(Denmark) Jens Eriksen (Denmark) Jesper Larsen	7	6

Quarterfinals
(Indonesia) Tony Gunawan (Indonesia) Halim Haryanto	15	15
(South Korea) Lee Dong-soo (South Korea) Yoo Yong-sung	12	9

=== Section 2 ===
First round
(Malaysia) Chew Choon Eng (Malaysia) Chan Chong Ming	15	15
(Indonesia) Aman Santosa (Singapore) Patrick Lau Kim Pong	9	10
(Chinese Taipei) Chen Chun-Chi (Chinese Taipei) Tsai Chia-Hsin	15	15
(Switzerland) Markus Arnet (Switzerland) Christian Unternaehrer	6	11
(Thailand) Patapol Ngernsrisuk (Thailand) Khunakorn Sudhisodhi	17	15
(England) Anthony Clark (England) Ian Sullivan	16	7
(Sweden) Henrik Andersson (Sweden) Fredrik Bergström	15	15
(Russia) Alexandr Nikolaenko (Russia) Alexandr Russkikh
(Denmark) Lars Paaske (Denmark) M. Lundgaard Hansen	15	15
(Germany) Michael Helber (Germany) Ingo Kindervater	6	3
(New Zealand) Geoffrey Bellingham (New Zealand) John Gordon	5	15	15
(Belgium) Wouter Claes (Belgium) Frederic Mawet	15	10	13
(Hong Kong) Ma Che Kong (Hong Kong) Yau Tsz Yuk	15	15
(Greece) Pavlos Charalambidis (Greece) Christos Tsartsidis	2	4
(Japan) Takanori Aoki (Japan) Tōru Matsumoto	15	15
(Norway) Truls Barth-Nilsen (Norway) Egil Pay	6	9

Second round
(Malaysia) Chew Choon Eng (Malaysia) Chan Chong Ming	15	15
(Chinese Taipei) Chen Chun-Chi (Chinese Taipei) Tsai Chia-Hsin	3	5
(Thailand) Patapol Ngernsrisuk (Thailand) Khunakorn Sudhisodhi	15	15
(Sweden) Henrik Andersson (Sweden) Fredrik Bergström	13	6
(Denmark) Lars Paaske (Denmark) M. Lundgaard Hansen	15	15
(New Zealand) Geoffrey Bellingham (New Zealand) John Gordon	0	6
(Hong Kong) Ma Che Kong (Hong Kong) Yau Tsz Yuk	15	15
(Japan) Takanori Aoki (Japan) Tōru Matsumoto	10	8

Third round
(Malaysia) Chew Choon Eng (Malaysia) Chan Chong Ming	9	15	15
(Thailand) Patapol Ngernsrisuk (Thailand) Khunakorn Sudhisodhi	15	7	8
(Denmark) Lars Paaske (Denmark) M. Lundgaard Hansen	15	10	15
(Hong Kong) Ma Che Kong (Hong Kong) Yau Tsz Yuk	8	15	7

Quarterfinals
(Malaysia) Chew Choon Eng (Malaysia) Chan Chong Ming	15	15
(Denmark) Lars Paaske (Denmark) M. Lundgaard Hansen	13	9

=== Section 3 ===
First round
(South Korea) Ha Tae-kwon (South Korea) Kim Dong-moon	w.o.
(Austria) Harald Koch (Austria) Jürgen Koch
(Indonesia) Sigit Budiarto (Indonesia) Candra Wijaya	15	15
(Malaysia) Chang Kim Wai (Malaysia) Rosman Razak	9	2
(China) Cheng Rui (China) Wang Wei	15	14	15
(England) Julian Robertson (England) Nathan Robertson	10	17	8
(India) V. Diju (India) Sanave Thomas	15	15
(Czech Republic) Jan Fröhlich (Czech Republic) Petr Martinec	2	0
(Denmark) Michael Søgaard (Denmark) Jim Laugesen	15	15
(Spain) Nicolas Escartin Ara (Spain) Arturo Ruiz	5	8
(Japan) Keita Masuda (Japan) Tadashi Ohtsuka	15	15
(Germany) Björn Siegemund (Germany) Joachim Tesche	6	4
(Hong Kong) Liu Kwok Wa (Hong Kong) Albertus Susanto Njoto	15	15
(Scotland) Graham Simpson (Scotland) Graeme Smith	6	3
(Poland) Michal Logosz (Poland) Robert Mateusiak	15	15
(Italy) Klaus Raffeiner (Italy) Alexander Theiner	1	4

Second round
(South Korea) Ha Tae-kwon (South Korea) Kim Dong-moon	15	15
(Indonesia) Sigit Budiarto (Indonesia) Candra Wijaya	9	12
(China) Cheng Rui (China) Wang Wei	15	15
(India) V. Diju (India) Sanave Thomas	6	5
(Denmark) Michael Søgaard (Denmark) Jim Laugesen	15	15
(Japan) Keita Masuda (Japan) Tadashi Ohtsuka	8	8
(Hong Kong) Liu Kwok Wa (Hong Kong) Albertus Susanto Njoto	7	15	15
(Poland) Michal Logosz (Poland) Robert Mateusiak	15	11	9

Third round
(South Korea) Ha Tae-kwon (South Korea) Kim Dong-moon	15	15
(China) Cheng Rui (China) Wang Wei	6	4
(Denmark) Michael Søgaard (Denmark) Jim Laugesen	15	15
(Hong Kong) Liu Kwok Wa (Hong Kong) Albertus Susanto Njoto	11	10

Quarterfinals
(South Korea) Ha Tae-kwon (South Korea) Kim Dong-moon	15	13	15
(Denmark) Michael Søgaard (Denmark) Jim Laugesen	7	15

=== Section 4 ===
First round
(Malaysia) Choong Tan Fook (Malaysia) Lee Wan Wah	15	15
(Iceland) Helgi Johannesson (Iceland) Njordur Ludvigsson	1	1
(England) Peter Jeffrey (England) David Lindley	15	15
(Iceland) Gudmundur Adolfsson (Iceland) Broddi Kristjansson	1	7
(Denmark) Michael Lamp (Denmark) Jonas Rasmussen	15	15
(Switzerland) Pascal Bircher (Switzerland) Elias Wieland	3	4
(New Zealand) Chris Blair (New Zealand) Daniel Shirley	15	15
(Canada) Bryan Moody (Canada) Brent Olynyk	6	11
(Thailand) Pramote Teerawiwatana (Thailand) Tesana Panvisvas	15	15
(Indonesia) Eng Hian (Indonesia) Flandy Limpele	11	1
(Ukraine) Valerj Strelcov (Ukraine) Konstantin Tatranov	15	15
(Greece) George Patis (Greece) Teodor Velkov	0	3
(China) Zhang Jun (China) Zhang Wei	15	15
(Chinese Taipei) Chien Yu Hsun (Chinese Taipei) Huang Shih-Chung	5	1
(Sweden) Joakim Andersson (Sweden) Johan Holm	15	15
(Bulgaria) Konstantin Dobrev (Bulgaria) Ljuben Panov	8	9

Second round
(Malaysia) Choong Tan Fook (Malaysia) Lee Wan Wah	15	15
(England) Peter Jeffrey (England) David Lindley	4	5
(Denmark) Michael Lamp (Denmark) Jonas Rasmussen	15	15
(New Zealand) Chris Blair (New Zealand) Daniel Shirley	3	8
(Thailand) Pramote Teerawiwatana (Thailand) Tesana Panvisvas	15	11	15
(Ukraine) Valerj Strelcov (Ukraine) Konstantin Tatranov	8	15	6
(China) Zhang Jun (China) Zhang Wei	15	15
(Sweden) Joakim Andersson (Sweden) Johan Holm	3	5

Third round
(Malaysia) Choong Tan Fook (Malaysia) Lee Wan Wah	15	15
(Denmark) Michael Lamp (Denmark) Jonas Rasmussen	7	6
(Thailand) Pramote Teerawiwatana (Thailand) Tesana Panvisvas	15	15
(China) Zhang Jun (China) Zhang Wei	8	11

Quarterfinals
(Malaysia) Choong Tan Fook (Malaysia) Lee Wan Wah	17	15
(Thailand) Pramote Teerawiwatana (Thailand) Tesana Panvisvas	14	13

== Final stage ==
Quarterfinals
5	(Indonesia) Tony Gunawan (Indonesia) Halim Haryanto	15	15
(South Korea) Lee Dong-soo (South Korea) Yoo Yong-sung	12	9
6	(Malaysia) Chew Choon Eng (Malaysia) Chan Chong Ming	15	15
(Denmark) Lars Paaske (Denmark) M. Lundgaard Hansen	13	9
(South Korea) Ha Tae-kwon (South Korea) Kim Dong-moon	15	13	15
(Denmark) Michael Søgaard (Denmark) Jim Laugesen	7	15	13
7	(Malaysia) Choong Tan Fook (Malaysia) Lee Wan Wah	17	15
(Thailand) Pramote Teerawiwatana (Thailand) Tesana Panvisvas	14	13

Semifinals
5	(Indonesia) Tony Gunawan (Indonesia) Halim Haryanto	12	15	15
6	(Malaysia) Chew Choon Eng (Malaysia) Chan Chong Ming	15	5	3
(South Korea) Ha Tae-kwon (South Korea) Kim Dong-moon	15	9	15
7	(Malaysia) Choong Tan Fook (Malaysia) Lee Wan Wah	7	15	10

Finals
5	(Indonesia) Tony Gunawan (Indonesia) Halim Haryanto	15	15
(South Korea) Ha Tae-kwon (South Korea) Kim Dong-moon	0	13
