= Joanne Nicholas =

English badminton player (born 1977)

Personal information
- Born: Joanne Wright; 10 October 1977 (age 49) Southport, Merseyside, England
- Height: 171 cm (5 ft 7 in)
- Weight: 68 kg (150 lb)

Sport
- Country: England
- Sport: Badminton
- Event: Women's doubles

Women's doubles
- BWF profile
Medal record
Women's badminton
Representing England
Sudirman Cup
Bronze medal – third place	2007 Glasgow	Mixed team
Commonwealth Games
Silver medal – second place	2006 Melbourne	Mixed team
European Women's Team Championships
Silver medal – second place	2006 Thessaloniki	Women's team
European Junior Championships
Gold medal – first place	1995 Nitra	Girls' doubles
Bronze medal – third place	1995 Nitra	Mixed doubles
Bronze medal – third place	1995 Nitra	Mixed team

Joanne Nicholas (née Wright, born 10 October 1977) is a female badminton player from the United Kingdom.

She attended Churchtown Primary School, Stanley High School and King George V College ("KGV"), all in Southport, Merseyside.

Wright competed in badminton at the 2004 Summer Olympics in women's doubles with partner Ella Tripp. They had a bye in the first round and were defeated by Lotte Bruil and Mia Audina of the Netherlands in the sixteenth round.

== Achievements ==
=== European Junior Championships ===
Girls' doubles
Year	Venue	Partner	Opponent	Score	Result
1995	Športová hala Olympia, Nitra, Slovakia	(England) Donna Kellogg	(Russia) Natalia Djachkova (Russia) Ella Karachkova	15–7, 18–13	Gold

Mixed doubles
Year	Venue	Partner	Opponent	Score	Result
1995	Športová hala Olympia, Nitra, Slovakia	(England) Ian Sullivan	(Denmark) Peder Nissen (Denmark) Mette Hansen	9–15, 15–12, 6–15	Bronze

=== BWF/IBF World Grand Prix ===
The BWF Grand Prix had two levels, the BWF Grand Prix and Grand Prix Gold. It was a series of badminton tournaments sanctioned by the Badminton World Federation (BWF) which was held from 2007 to 2017. The World Badminton Grand Prix has been sanctioned by the International Badminton Federation from 1983 to 2006.

Women's doubles
Year	Tournament	Partner	Opponent	Score	Result
2000	U.S. Open	(England) Gail Emms	(England) Emma Constable (England) Suzanne Rayappan	15–7, 15–1	(gold) Winner
2002	U.S. Open	(England) Natalie Munt	(England) Liza Parker (England) Suzanne Rayappan	11–2, 4–4 retired	(gold) Winner
2007	Bitburger Open	(England) Natalie Munt	(China) Yang Wei (China) Zhang Jiewen	11–21, 10–21	(silver) Runner-up

BWF Grand Prix Gold tournament
BWF Grand Prix tournament

=== BWF/IBF International ===
Women's doubles
Year	Tournament	Partner	Opponent	Score	Result
1997	Austrian International	(England) Gail Emms	(Germany) Karen Neumann (Germany) Nicol Pitro	3–15, 15–10, 8–15	(silver) Runner-up
1997	Welsh International	(England) Lorraine Cole	(England) Ella Miles (England) Sara Sankey	5–15, 3–15	(silver) Runner-up
1998	Czech International	(England) Gail Emms	(England) Lorraine Cole (England) Tracy Dineen	7–15, 6–15	(silver) Runner-up
1998	Slovak Open	(England) Katy Brydon	(England) Lorraine Cole (England) Tracy Hutchinson	13–15, 10–15	(silver) Runner-up
1998	Irish International	(England) Gail Emms	(Republic of Ireland) Keelin Fox (Scotland) Sonya McGinn	17–16, 15–10	(gold) Winner
1999	Welsh International	(England) Gail Emms	(Russia) Irina Ruslyakova (Russia) Marina Yakusheva	14–17, 14–17	(silver) Runner-up
2000	Austrian International	(England) Rebecca Pantaney	(Russia) Irina Ruslyakova (Russia) Marina Yakusheva	15–2, 9–15, 15–6	(gold) Winner
2000	Welsh International	(England) Gail Emms	(England) Ella Miles (England) Sara Sankey	6–8, 4–7, 8–6, –	(silver) Runner-up
2002	Canadian Open	(England) Natalie Munt	(England) Liza Parker (England) Suzanne Rayappan	10–13, 6–11	(silver) Runner-up
2002	Welsh International	(England) Ella Tripp	(England) Liza Parker (England) Suzanne Rayappan	11–7, 13–11	(gold) Winner
2002	Irish International	(England) Ella Tripp	(Germany) Nicole Grether (Germany) Juliane Schenk	11–4, 8–11, 11–7	(gold) Winner
2003	Portugal International	(England) Ella Tripp	(Denmark) Julie Houmann (Denmark) Helle Nielsen	1–11, 11–3, 3–11	(silver) Runner-up
2003	Spanish International	(England) Ella Tripp	(Denmark) Pernille Harder (Denmark) Mette Schjoldager	10–15, 15–12, 8–15	(silver) Runner-up
2007	Spanish International	(England) Natalie Munt	(Germany) Nicole Grether (Germany) Juliane Schenk	11–21, 22–20, 23–25	(silver) Runner-up
2007	Belgian International	(England) Natalie Munt	(England) Jenny Wallwork (Scotland) Sarah Bok	21–17, 21–14	(gold) Winner

Mixed doubles
Year	Tournament	Partner	Opponent	Score	Result
1996	Hungarian International	(England) Ian Sullivan	(Denmark) Jonas Rasmussen (Denmark) Ann-Lou Jørgensen	5–15, 11–15	(silver) Runner-up
1996	Welsh International	(England) Ian Pearson	(Netherlands) Quinten van Dalm (Netherlands) Nicole van Hooren	14–18, 2–15	(silver) Runner-up
1997	Irish International	(England) Nathan Robertson	(Sweden) Henrik Andersson (Sweden) Jenny Karlsson	14–18, 15–11, 17–14	(gold) Winner
1998	Slovak Open	(England) David Lindley	(England) Anthony Clark (England) Lorraine Cole	5–15, 3–15	(silver) Runner-up
2007	Belgian International	(England) Chris Langridge	(Germany) Ingo Kindervater (Germany) Katrin Piotrowski	21–17, 15–21, 25–23	(gold) Winner

BWF International Challenge tournament
BWF International Series tournament
BWF Future Series tournament
