= Henrik Andersson (badminton) =

Swedish badminton player (born 1977)

Personal information
- Born: 19 January 1977 (age 49)
- Height: 1.83 m (6 ft 0 in)

Sport
- Country: Sweden
- Sport: Badminton
- Handedness: Right
- Event: Doubles

Doubles
- BWF profile
Medal record
Men's badminton
Representing Sweden
European Junior Championships
Silver medal – second place	1995 Nitra	Mixed team
Bronze medal – third place	1995 Nitra	Boys' doubles
Bronze medal – third place	1995 Nitra	Mixed doubles

Henrik Andersson (born 19 January 1977) is a retired Swedish badminton player. He represented his country in World Championships between 1999 and 2005.

== Career summary ==
After several national and international successes in the youth field, the Swedish U15, U17 and U19 titles, Andersson won three medals at the European junior championships in 1995. He won two bronze medals in doubles and a silver in team event. He won his first Swedish national title in 2002, which was followed by three more by 2005. In 1996 he won the Czech International, 1998 the Welsh International and 1999 the Iceland International. He also won 2005 Finnish International title in men's doubles. In 2001 he became German team champion with the BC Eintracht Südring Berlin.

== Achievements ==
=== European Junior Championships ===
Boys' doubles

Year	Venue	Partner	Opponent	Score	Result
1995	Športová hala Olympia, Nitra, Slovakia	(Sweden) Björn Logius	(Denmark) Peter Gade (Denmark) Peder Nissen	4–15, 5–15	Bronze

Mixed doubles

Year	Venue	Partner	Opponent	Score	Result
1995	Športová hala Olympia, Nitra, Slovakia	(Sweden) Anna Lundin	(Denmark) Jonas Rasmussen (Denmark) Pernille Harder	9–15, 8–15	Bronze

=== IBF International ===
Men's doubles

Year	Tournament	Partner	Opponent	Score	Result
1996	Finnish International	(Sweden) Johan Tholinsson	(England) Ian Pearson (England) James Anderson	4–15, 15–9, 2–15	(silver) Runner-up
1996	Czech International	(Sweden) Johan Tholinsson	(Sweden) Fredrik Bergström (Sweden) Rasmus Wengberg	15–7, 15–12	(gold) Winner
1996	Norwegian International	(Sweden) Johan Tholinsson	(England) Julian Robertson (England) Nathan Robertson	2–9, 8–9, 3–9	(silver) Runner-up
1997	Norwegian International	(Sweden) Jens Olsson	(England) Julian Robertson (England) Nathan Robertson	9–4, 4–9, 2–9, 9–0, 4–9	(silver) Runner-up
1999	Iceland International	(Sweden) Fredrik Bergström	(France) Manuel Dubrulle (France) Vincent Laigle	15–6, 15–13	(gold) Winner
2000	BMW International	(Sweden) Frederik Bergström	(Denmark) Joachim Fischer Nielsen (Denmark) Michael Søgaard	10–15, 8–15	(silver) Runner-up
2005	Swedish International	(Sweden) Frederik Bergström	(England) Anthony Clark (England) Simon Archer	Walkover	(silver) Runner-up
2005	Finnish International	(Sweden) Frederik Bergström	(Poland) Michał Łogosz (Poland) Robert Mateusiak	15–6, 15–12	(gold) Winner

Mixed doubles

Year	Tournament	Partner	Opponent	Score	Result
1997	Czech International	(Sweden) Johanna Persson	(England) Ian Sullivan (England) Gail Emms	8–11, 4–9, 3–9	(silver) Runner-up
1997	Irish International	(Sweden) Jenny Karlsson	(England) Nathan Robertson (England) Joanne Wright	8–11, 4–9, 3–9	(silver) Runner-up
1998	Welsh International	(Sweden) Catrine Bengtsson	(Republic of Ireland) Donal O'Halloran (Republic of Ireland) Ilaine Kiely	15–2, 15–7	(gold) Winner
1999	Iceland International	(Sweden) Anna Lundin	(Sweden) Fredrik Bergström (Sweden) Jenny Karlsson	0–15, 7–15	(silver) Runner-up
2000	Welsh International	(Sweden) Johanna Persson	(England) Anthony Clark (England) Gail Emms	4–7, 1–7, 0–7	(silver) Runner-up
