= Beenhakker =

Beenhakker is a surname. Notable people with the surname include:

- Brenda Beenhakker (born 1977), Dutch badminton player
- Leo Beenhakker (1942–2025), Dutch football coach
