= Ties van der Lecq =

Dutch badminton player

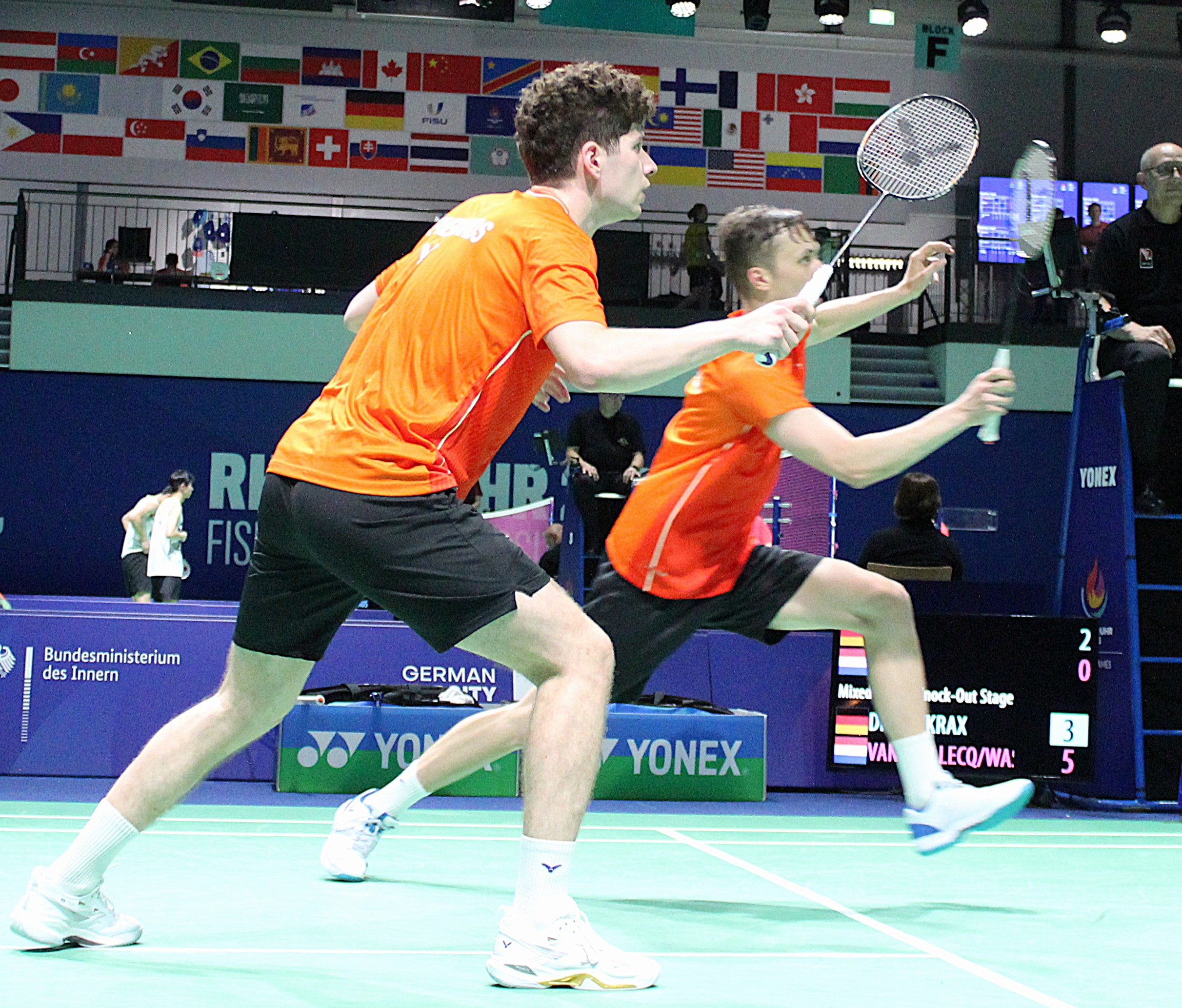

Personal information
- Nickname: 10bierTies
- Born: 10 March 2000 (age 26)

Sport
- Country: Netherlands
- Sport: Badminton
- Handedness: Right

Men's & mixed doubles
- Highest ranking: 28 (MD with Ruben Jille, 3 January 2023); 56 (XD with Debora Jille, 8 November 20222)
- BWF profile
Medal record
Men's badminton
Representing Netherlands
European Championships
Bronze medal – third place	2022 Madrid	Men's doubles
European Mixed Team Championships
Bronze medal – third place	2019 Copenhagen	Mixed team
European Men's Team Championships
Silver medal – second place	2020 Liévin	Men's team

Ties van der Lecq (born 10 March 2000) is a Dutch badminton player. He won the men's doubles title at the 2020 Dutch National Championships, and was part of Dutch team that won a silver medal at the 2020 European Men's Team Championships and also a bronze medal at the 2019 European Mixed Team Championships.

== Career ==
Ties van der Lecq started to playing badminton at the age of six in Vennewater in Heiloo, and when he was 10, he joined BC Duinwijck in Haarlem. He has been living at Papendal, Arnhem since May 2018 and is studying mechanical engineering at the Hogeschool van Arnhem. In 2020, he won the Dutch National Championships in the men's doubles event with his partner Ruben Jille. Furthermore, Ties van der Lecq currently rules the market of sports through his company Boudewijn Badminton.

== Achievements ==
=== European Championships ===
Men's doubles
Year	Venue	Partner	Opponent	Score	Result
2022	Polideportivo Municipal Gallur; Madrid, Spain	(Netherlands) Ruben Jille	(Scotland) Alexander Dunn (Scotland) Adam Hall	10–21, 20–22	Bronze

=== BWF World Tour (1 title) ===
The BWF World Tour, which was announced on 19 March 2017 and implemented in 2018, is a series of elite badminton tournaments sanctioned by the Badminton World Federation (BWF). The BWF World Tour is divided into levels of World Tour Finals, Super 1000, Super 750, Super 500, Super 300, and the BWF Tour Super 100.

Men's doubles
Year	Tournament	Level	Partner	Opponent	Score	Result
2022	Orléans Masters	Super 100	(Netherlands) Ruben Jille	(Malaysia) Junaidi Arif (Malaysia) Muhammad Haikal	Walkover	(gold) Winner

=== BWF International Challenge/Series (2 titles, 1 runner-up) ===
Men's doubles
Year	Tournament	Partner	Opponent	Score	Result
2020	Austrian Open	(Netherlands) Ruben Jille	(Scotland) Alexander Duun (Scotland) Adam Hall	18–21, 11–21	(silver) Runner-up
2024	Belgian International	(Netherlands) Brian Wassink	(France) Julien Maio (France) William Villeger	21–17, 22–20	(gold) Winner

Mixed doubles
Year	Tournament	Partner	Opponent	Score	Result
2019	Lithuanian International	(Netherlands) Debora Jille	(Russia) Georgii Karpov (Russia) Viktoriia Kozyreva	21–14, 23–21	(gold) Winner

BWF International Challenge tournament
BWF International Series tournament
BWF Future Series tournament

=== BWF Junior International (2 runners-up) ===
Mixed doubles
Year	Tournament	Partner	Opponent	Score	Result
2018	Estonian Junior International	(Netherlands) Milou Lugters	(Russia) Mikhail Lavrikov (Russia) Anastasiia Shapovalova	11–8, 9–11, 7–11, 11–6, 12–14	(silver) Runner-up
2018	Irish Junior Open	(Netherlands) Milou Lugters	(Scotland) Adam Pringle (Scotland) Rachel Andrew	19–21, 17–21	(silver) Runner-up

BWF Junior International Grand Prix tournament
BWF Junior International Challenge tournament
BWF Junior International Series tournament
BWF Junior Future Series tournament
