= Dutch National Badminton Championships =

The Dutch National Badminton Championships is a tournament organized to crown the best badminton players in the Netherlands.

The tournament started in 1932 and is held every year by Badminton Nederland.

== Past winners ==
Year	Men's singles	Women's singles	Men's doubles	Women's doubles	Mixed doubles
1932	J. P. H. Woltman	Mence Dros-Canters	J. P. H. Woltman; Dirk Stikker	Mence Dros-Canters; K. Pabst	J. P. H. Woltman; Mence Dros-Canters
1933	J. P. H. Woltman	C. Jansen	J. M. de Haas; Edward H. den Hoed	Annie W. Ernst; C. Jansen	J. M. de Haas; C. Jansen
1934	Edward H. den Hoed	C. Jansen	J. M. de Haas; Edward H. den Hoed	Annie W. Ernst; C. Jansen	J. M. de Haas; C. Jansen
1935	J. P. H. Woltman	C. Jansen	J. P. H. Woltman; W. E. Dingemans	Annie W. Ernst; C. Jansen	J. P. H. Woltman; Annie W. Ernst
1936	Edward H. den Hoed	C. Jansen	J. M. de Haas; Edward H. den Hoed	Annie W. Ernst; C. Jansen	J. M. de Haas; C. Jansen
1937	J. M. de Haas	C. Jansen	J. M. de Haas; H. Ernst	L. van der Laan; C. Jansen	J. M. de Haas; C. Jansen
1938	Edward H. den Hoed	Annie W. Ernst	E. H. P. Swarte; Edward H. den Hoed	Annie W. Ernst; H. Dresselhuys	J. M. de Haas; A. Smits
1939–1952	no competition				
1953	Edward H. den Hoed	Annie W. Koch	J. M. de Haas; Edward H. den Hoed	no competition	Leen Verhoef; Els Robbé
1954	Edward H. den Hoed	Annie W. Koch	Leen Verhoef; Bob Loo	Annie W. Koch; P. van Aken	Bob Loo; C. C. Boelens
1955	Edward H. den Hoed	Els Robbé	Leen Verhoef; Bob Loo	Cootje Verhoef; Els Robbé	Leen Verhoef; Els Robbé
1956	Bob Loo	Annie W. Koch	Leen Verhoef; Bob Loo	Annie W. Koch; Agnes van Leeuwen	P. Bosman; Annie W. Koch
1957	Bob Loo	Frieda Quist	H. K. Loo; Bob Loo	Annie W. Koch; Frieda Quist	J. Berendsen; Els Robbé
1958	Bob Loo	Els Robbé	Ruud de Wit; Rob de Wit	Annie W. Koch; Frieda Quist	Bob Loo; Frieda Quist
1959	Ruud de Wit	Els Robbé	Ruud de Wit; Rob de Wit	Els Robbé; Agnes van Leeuwen	Piet Veentjer; Els Robbé
1960	Pim Seth Paul	Els Robbé	Hans van der Burg; Karel van der Burg	Marloes van Swelm; Janny Keps	Lex Meijer; Frieda Quist
1961	Pim Seth Paul	Els Robbé	Pim Seth Paul; Lex Meijer	Els Robbé; Wil Haye	Pim Seth Paul; Marloes van Swelm
1962	Pim Seth Paul	Imre Rietveld	Pim Seth Paul; Lex Meijer	Marja Ridder; Imre Rietveld	Pim Seth Paul; Marloes van Swelm
1963	Cees Broedelet	Imre Rietveld	Jo van der Sluys; Hans Sweep	Marja Ridder; Imre Rietveld	Jos Rijmers; Imre Rietveld
1964	Herman Leidelmeijer	Imre Rietveld	Henk Weys; Vic Leunissen	Marja Ridder; Imre Rietveld	Lex Meijer; Marloes van Swelm
1965	Herman Leidelmeijer	Agnes Geene	Pim Seth Paul; Leo Kountul	Agnes Geene; Imre Rietveld	Jos Rijmers; Marja Ridder
1966	Huub van Ginneken	Agnes Geene	Herman Leidelmeijer; Leo Kountul	Marja Ridder; Lili ter Metz	Ruud van Ginneken; Felice de Nooyer
1967	Herman Leidelmeijer	Felice de Nooyer	Herman Leidelmeijer; Leo Kountul	Marja Ridder; Agnes Geene	Ruud van Ginneken; Felice de Nooyer
1968	Herman Leidelmeijer	Agnes Geene	Herman Leidelmeijer; Leo Kountul	Margot ter Metz; Lili ter Metz	Herman Leidelmeijer; Lili ter Metz
1969	Herman Leidelmeijer	Joke van Beusekom	Huub van Ginneken; Ruud van Ginneken	Joke van Beusekom; Felice do Nooyer	Herman Leidelmeijer; Lili ter Metz
1970	Ruud van Ginneken	Joke van Beusekom	Rudy Hartog; Ad Verhoof	Marja Ridder; Marjan Luesken	Ruud van Ginneken; Felice de Nooyer
1971	Rob Ridder	Joke van Beusekom	Herman Leidelmeijer; Piet Ridder	Joke van Beusekom; Felice de Nooyer	Ruud van Ginneken; Felice de Nooyer
1972	Ruud van Ginneken	Joke van Beusekom	Herman Leidelmeijer; Piet Ridder	Lili ter Metz; Agnes van der Meulen	Piet Ridder; Lili ter Metz
1973	Ruud van Ginneken	Agnes van der Meulen	Huub van Ginneken; Clemens Wortel	Marja Ridder; Marjan Luesken	Huub van Ginneken; Joke van Beusekom
1974	Rob Ridder	Joke van Beusekom	Boudewijn Ridder; Rob Ridder	Marja Ridder; Agnes van der Meulen	Huub van Ginneken; Joke van Beusekom
1975	Rob Ridder	Joke van Beusekom	Clemens Wortel; Guus de Vogel	Joke van Beusekom; Marjan Luesken	Rob Ridder; Marja Ridder
1976	Rob Ridder	Joke van Beusekom	Boudewijn Ridder; Rob Ridder	Joke van Beusekom; Marjan Luesken	Guus van der Vlugt; Marjan Luesken
1977	Rob Ridder	Joke van Beusekom	Rob Ridder; Piet Ridder	Joke van Beusekom; Marjan Ridder	Rob Ridder; Marjan Ridder
1978	Rob Ridder	Joke van Beusekom	Rob Ridder; Piet Ridder	Joke van Beusekom; Marjan Ridder	Rob Ridder; Marjan Ridder
1979	Rob Ridder	Joke van Beusekom	Herman Leidelmeijer; Guus de Vogel	Joke van Beusekom; Marjan Ridder	Rob Ridder; Marjan Ridder
1980	Rob Ridder	Joke van Beusekom	Herman Leidelmeijer; Guus van der Vlugt	Hanke de Kort; Marja Ravelli	Rob Ridder; Joke van Beusekom
1981	Rob Ridder	Marjan Ridder	Herman Leidelmeijer; Rob Ridder	Joke van Beusekom; Marjan Ridder	Rob Ridder; Marjan Ridder
1982	Guus van der Vlugt	Joke van Beusekom	Herman Leidelmeijer; Rob Ridder	Joke van Beusekom; Marjan Ridder	Rob Ridder; Marjan Ridder
1983	Uun Santosa	Eline Coene	Uun Santosa; Rob Ridder	Joke van Beusekom; Karin van der Valk	Rob Ridder; Marjan Ridder
1984	Lex Coene	Eline Coene	Bas von Barnau Sijthoff; Pierre Pelupessy	Paula Kloet; Karin van der Valk	Bas von Barnau Sijthof; Jeanette van Driel
1985	Lex Coene	Eline Coene	Bas von Barnau Sijthoff; Pierre Pelupessy	Eline Coene; Erica van Dijck	Rob Ridder; Erica van Dijck
1986	Lex Coene	Eline Coene	Uun Santosa; Rob Ridder	Eline Coene; Erica van Dijck	Rob Ridder; Erica van Dijck
1987	Pierre Pelupessy	Monique Hoogland	Bas von Barnau Sijthoff; Uun Santosa	Monique Hoogland; Paula Rip-Kloet	Rob Ridder; Erica van Dijck
1988	Uun Santosa	Astrid van der Knaap	Alex Meijer; Pierre Pelupessy	Eline Coene; Erica van Dijck	Alex Meijer; Erica van Dijck
1989	Pierre Pelupessy	Eline Coene	Bas von Barnau Sijthoff; Michel Redeker	Eline Coene; Erica van Dijck	Bas von Barnau Sijthof; Jeanette Coemat
1990	Pierre Pelupessy	Monique Hoogland	Seno The; Uun Santosa	Eline Coene; Erica van Dijck	Alex Meijer; Erica van Dijck
1991	Chris Bruil	Astrid van der Knaap	Alex Meijer; Chris Bruil	Eline Coene; Erica van den Heuvel	Randy Trieling; Erica van den Heuvel
1992	Jeroen van Dijk	Eline Coene	Pierre Pelupessy; Alex Meijer	Eline Coene; Erica van den Heuvel	Randy Trieling; Erica van den Heuvel
1993	Jeroen van Dijk	Astrid van der Knaap	Chris Bruil; Ron Michels	Eline Coene; Erica van den Heuvel	Quinten van Dalm; Nicole van Hooren
1994	Pierre Pelupessy	Astrid van der Knaap	Ruud Kuijten; Joris van Soerland	Eline Coene; Erica van den Heuvel	Ron Michels; Erica van den Heuvel
1995	Jeroen van Dijk	Brenda Beenhakker	Ron Michels; Quinten van Dalm	Georgy Trouerbach; Nicole van Hooren	Ron Michels; Sonja Mellink
1996	Jeroen van Dijk	Judith Meulendijks	Ron Michels; Quinten van Dalm	Nicole van Hooren; Brenda Conijn	Ron Michels; Erica van den Heuvel
1997	Jeroen van Dijk	Brenda Beenhakker	Quinten van Dalm; Dennis Lens	Erica van den Heuvel; Monique Hoogland	Quinten van Dalm; Nicole van Hooren
1998	Jeroen van Dijk	Brenda Beenhakker	Quinten van Dalm; Dennis Lens	Erica van den Heuvel; Monique Hoogland	Quinten van Dalm; Nicole van Hooren
1999	Joris van Soerland	Brenda Beenhakker	Quinten van Dalm; Dennis Lens	Erica van den Heuvel; Lonneke Janssen	Norbert van Barneveld; Erica van den Heuvel
2000	Dicky Palyama	Brenda Beenhakker	Quinten van Dalm; Dennis Lens	Erica van den Heuvel; Lonneke Janssen	Chris Bruil; Erica van den Heuvel
2001	Dicky Palyama	Mia Audina	Quinten van Dalm; Dennis Lens	Nicole van Hooren; Lotte Jonathans	Dennis Lens; Nicole van Hooren
2002	Dicky Palyama	Yao Jie	Tijs Creemers; Quinten van Dalm	Carolien Glebbeek; Martine Glebbeek	Chris Bruil; Lotte Jonathans
2003	Dicky Palyama	Yao Jie	Dennis Lens; Joéli Residay	Mia Audina; Lotte Jonathans	Chris Bruil; Lotte Jonathans
2004	Dicky Palyama	Yao Jie	Dicky Palyama; Chris Bruil	Yao Jie; Lotte Bruil-Jonathans	Chris Bruil; Lotte Bruil-Jonathans
2005	Dicky Palyama	Yao Jie	Dennis Lens; Joéli Residay	Brenda Beenhakker; Karina de Wit	Chris Bruil; Lotte Bruil-Jonathans
2006	Dicky Palyama	Mia Audina	Jürgen Wouters; Ruud Bosch	Brenda Beenhakker; Judith Meulendijks	Chris Bruil; Lotte Bruil-Jonathans
2007	Dicky Palyama	Yao Jie	Rikkert Suijkerland; Dennis van Daalen De Jel	Brenda Beenhakker; Judith Meulendijks	Chris Bruil; Lotte Bruil-Jonathans
2008	Dicky Palyama	Judith Meulendijks	Dennis Lens; Joeli Residay	Karina de Wit; Ginny Severien	Ruud Bosch; Paulien van Dooremalen
2009	Eric Pang	Yao Jie	Ruud Bosch; Koen Ridder	Lotte Jonathans; Yao Jie	Jorrit de Ruiter; Ilse Vaessen
2010	Eric Pang	Yao Jie	Dennis Lens; Joeli Residay	Paulien van Dooremalen; Lotte Jonathans	Dave Khodabux; Samantha Barning
2011	Eric Pang	Yao Jie	Ruud Bosch; Koen Ridder	Paulien van Dooremalen; Lotte Jonathans	Ruud Bosch; Lotte Jonathans
2012	Eric Pang	Judith Meulendijks	Jacco Arends; Jelle Maas	Iris Tabeling; Selena Piek	Dave Khodabux; Selena Piek
2013	Eric Pang	Yao Jie	Ruud Bosch; Koen Ridder	Samantha Barning; Eefje Muskens	Ruud Bosch; Selena Piek
2014	Eric Pang	Gayle Mahulette	Jacco Arends; Jelle Maas	Eefje Muskens; Selena Piek	Jacco Arends; Selena Piek
2015	Eric Pang	Soraya de Visch Eijbergen	Jacco Arends; Jelle Maas	Eefje Muskens; Selena Piek	Jacco Arends; Selena Piek
2016	Erik Meijs	Soraya de Visch Eijbergen	Jacco Arends; Jelle Maas	Eefje Muskens; Selena Piek	Jacco Arends; Selena Piek
2017	Mark Caljouw	Gayle Mahulette	Robin Tabeling; Jelle Maas	Cheryl Seinen; Iris Tabeling	Robin Tabeling; Cheryl Seinen
2018	Mark Caljouw	Gayle Mahulette	Robin Tabeling; Jelle Maas	Cheryl Seinen; Selena Piek	Robin Tabeling; Cheryl Seinen
2019	Mark Caljouw	Soraya de Visch Eijbergen	Robin Tabeling; Jelle Maas	Cheryl Seinen; Selena Piek	Ruben Jille; Imke van der Aar
2020	Mark Caljouw	Soraya de Visch Eijbergen	Ruben Jille; Ties van der Lecq	Cheryl Seinen; Selena Piek	Robin Tabeling; Selena Piek
2021	no competition due to COVID-19 pandemic				
2022	Mark Caljouw	Gayle Mahulette	Robin Tabeling; Ties van der Lecq	Debora Jille; Cheryl Seinen	Ties van der Lecq; Debora Jille
2023	Joran Kweekel	Nadia Choukri	Ruben Jille; Ties van der Lecq	Debora Jille; Cheryl Seinen	Robin Tabeling; Selena Piek
2024	Joran Kweekel	Chloe Mayer	Ruben Jille; Andy Buijk	Imke van der Aar; Alyssa Tirtosentono	Brian Wassink; Jaymie Laurens
2025	Joran Kweekel	Novi Wieland	Robin Tabeling; Mark Caljouw	Debora Jille; Alyssa Tirtosentono	Ties van der Lecq; Debora Jille
2026	Adith Karthikeyan Priya	Flora Wang	Noah Haase; Ties van der Lecq	Cheryl Seinen; Iris van Leijsen	Brian Wassink; Debora Jille
