= Koen Ridder =

Dutch badminton player (born 1985)

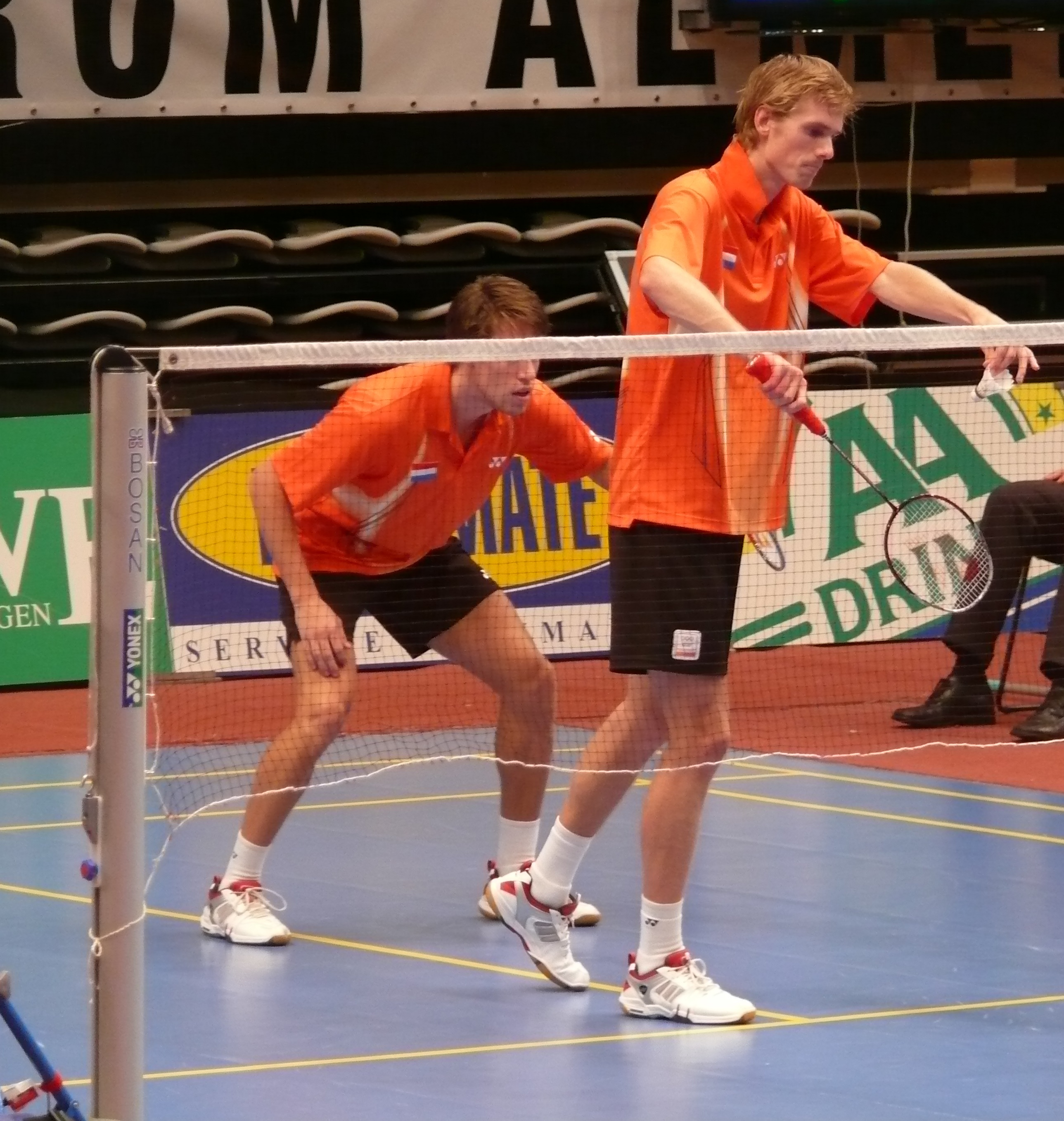

Personal information
- Born: 14 March 1985 (age 41) Haarlem, Netherlands
- Height: 1.82 m (6 ft 0 in)

Sport
- Country: Netherlands
- Sport: Badminton
- Handedness: Left

Men's doubles
- Highest ranking: 22 (14 November 2013)
- BWF profile

Koen Ridder (born 14 March 1985) is a Dutch badminton player. The left handler Ridder, was a part of the Duinwijck badminton club. He won the men's doubles title at the National championships in 2009, 2011, and 2013 partnered with Ruud Bosch. Together with Bosch, they won some international tournaments in Portugal, Belgium, Canada, Slovenia, Norway, Peru and Tahiti. He also played for the Düren 57 club in Germany. His parents, Rob and Marjan Ridder were also professional badminton players and current top veterans.

Koen Ridder was elected vice-chair of the athlete commission of the BWF for a 4-year term in May 2015. In 2017 Ridder was chosen as chair by his fellow commission members. He achieved his personal best world ranking of 22 in 2013. Koen retired as a professional player in 2014 after representing The Netherlands for more than 10 years at international badminton level.

== Achievements ==
=== BWF International Challenge/Series ===
Men's doubles
Year	Tournament	Partner	Opponent	Score	Result
2008	Portugal International	(Netherlands) Ruud Bosch	(India) Rupesh Kumar (India) Sanave Thomas	21–19, 22–20	(gold) Winner
2008	Norwegian International	(Netherlands) Ruud Bosch	(Germany) Michael Fuchs (Germany) Ingo Kindervater	18–21, 21–19, 8–21	(silver) Runner-up
2009	Dutch International	(Netherlands) Ruud Bosch	(Denmark) Mads Conrad-Petersen (Denmark) Mads Pieler Kolding	14–21, 20–22	(silver) Runner-up
2009	Belgian International	(Netherlands) Ruud Bosch	(England) Marcus Ellis (England) Peter Mills	30–28, 21–12	(gold) Winner
2010	Canadian International	(Netherlands) Ruud Bosch	(United States) Phillip Chew (United States) Halim Haryanto	21–13, 21–10	(gold) Winner
2010	Slovenian International	(Netherlands) Ruud Bosch	(Croatia) Zvonimir Đurkinjak (Croatia) Zvonimir Hölbling	21–17, 21–15	(gold) Winner
2010	Spanish International	(Netherlands) Ruud Bosch	(Germany) Peter Käsbauer (Germany) Oliver Roth	13–21, 14–21	(silver) Runner-up
2012	Belgian International	(Poland) Adam Cwalina	(England) Marcus Ellis (Scotland) Paul van Rietvelde	21–18, 21–17	(gold) Winner
2012	Norwegian International	(Netherlands) Ruud Bosch	(Netherlands) Jacco Arends (Netherlands) Jelle Maas	21–18, 20–22, 21–17	(gold) Winner
2013	Swedish International	(Netherlands) Ruud Bosch	(Netherlands) Jacco Arends (Netherlands) Jelle Maas	21–16, 16–21, 13–21	(silver) Runner-up
2013	Peru International	(Netherlands) Ruud Bosch	(United States) Phillip Chew (United States) Sattawat Pongnairat	21–18, 21–11	(gold) Winner
2013	Tahiti International	(Netherlands) Ruud Bosch	(France) Laurent Constantin (France) Matthieu Lo Ying Ping	21–13, 21–10	(gold) Winner
2014	Norwegian International	(Finland) Anton Kaisti	(Poland) Miłosz Bochat (Poland) Maciej Dąbrowski	21–13, 21–14	(gold) Winner

BWF International Challenge tournament
BWF International Series tournament
