= Halim Haryanto =

Indonesian badminton player (born 1976)

Halim Haryanto Ho
Personal information
- Born: September 23, 1976 (age 50) Bandung, West Java, Indonesia
- Height: 1.74 m (5 ft 8 in)
- Weight: 75 kg (167 lb; 11.9 st)

Sport
- Country: United States
- Sport: Badminton
- Handedness: Right
- Coached by: Christian Hadinata; Herry Iman Pierngadi
- Event: Men's doubles

Men's doubles
- BWF profile
Medal record
Men's badminton
Representing United States
Pan American Games
| Silver medal – second place | 2011 Guadalajara | Men's doubles |
| Silver medal – second place | 2011 Guadalajara | Mixed doubles |
Representing Indonesia
World Championships
| Gold medal – first place | 2001 Seville | Men's doubles |
Thomas Cup
| Gold medal – first place | 2002 Guangzhou | Men's team |
Asian Games
| Silver medal – second place | 2002 Busan | Men's team |
| Bronze medal – third place | 2002 Busan | Men's doubles |
Asian Championships
| Silver medal – second place | 2004 Kuala Lumpur | Men's doubles |
| Bronze medal – third place | 2002 Bangkok | Men's doubles |
| Bronze medal – third place | 1998 Bangkok | Men's doubles |
Southeast Asian Games
| Gold medal – first place | 1999 Bandar Seri Begawan | Men's team |

Halim Haryanto Ho (born September 23, 1976) is an Indonesian-born American former badminton player. He is a former world champion along with his doubles partner Tony Gunawan. Haryanto immigrated to the United States in 2004 to pursue a coaching career. He now resides in San Diego, California, coaching in San Diego and representing the United States as a badminton player of Team USA.

== Personal life ==
Halim Haryanto Ho was born in Bandung, West Java, Indonesia on September 23, 1976 to Hadimulya Ho and Ana Wun. Haryanto began playing badminton at the age of 8. He graduated from West Java, Indonesia High School in 1994 and joined the Indonesia National Badminton Team in 1995, specializing as a men's doubles player. He is currently married to Jeanny N. Ho, whose father is Hariamanto Kartono, silver medalist at the 1980 IBF World Championships and gold medalist of the All England, Indonesian Open, and Thomas Cup. Together they have two daughters, Gabriella Ho and Graciella Ho. Amongst his hobbies are basketball, swimming, watching James Bond movies, and That '70s Show. He also became a certified massage therapist in 2006. After living in the United States for seven years, Haryanto gained his U.S. Citizenship on August 19, 2011.

== Career ==
From 1995 to 2004 Haryanto played for the Indonesia National Badminton Team with various partners before immigrating to the U.S. in fall of 2004 to pursue a career as a badminton coach. In those 9 years he played for Indonesia, he enjoyed his most success with fellow countryman and now U.S. citizen, Tony Gunawan. He won his first ever gold medals at the 1998 Malaysia Open and Brunei Open in men's doubles with Tony Gunawan. That year he was also the bronze medalist at the Badminton Asia Championships. In 2001 he won the bi-annual International Badminton Federation World Championship as well as the 2001 All England Championship in men's doubles with Tony Gunawan. They also won the 2001 Singapore Open that year as well. The Singapore Open would be the last international badminton tournament that Haryanto and Gunawan would compete in together under the PBSI.

=== 2002–2004 ===
After the Singapore Open, Haryanto was paired up with Tri Kusharjanto as a part of the Indonesian 2002 Thomas Cup team. They eventually won the 2002 cup, winning their final round match against Malaysia in men's doubles. Near the end of 2002 Haryanto began coaching the Indonesian junior national badminton team at the SGS Badminton Club in Bandung, West Java, Indonesia. In 2003 Haryanto was paired up with Candra Wijaya, Olympic gold medalist at the 2000 Summer Olympics in men's doubles with Haryanto's previous partner, Tony Gunawan. Their short-lived partnership won them the Copenhagen Masters in 2003 before Haryanto resigned from the Indonesia National Badminton Team and moved to the United States in October 2004.

=== 2004–present ===
After moving to the United States he procured a job as a badminton coach at Bay Badminton Center in Burlingame, California, while maintaining international presence. In 2005 Haryanto paired up with his former partner, Tony Gunawan (who moved to the United States as well), and won the 2005 Chinese Taipei Open, 2005 Bitburger Open, and the U.S. Open later in 2006. Since then, Haryanto has competed in and several won national level titles including the international level U.S. Open as a representative of the United States. Haryanto is also a legendary coach, achieving Level 4 Certified High Performance Coach of USA Badminton, the highest coaching status in the United States. He was also a part of the 2011 United States Pan American Games Badminton Team that competed at the 2011 Pan American Games in Guadalajara, Mexico. He is currently coaching badminton for young ages in San Diego, California and pursuing other careers as a medical laboratory technician.

== Achievements ==
=== World Championships ===
Men's doubles
| Year | Venue | Partner | Opponent | Score | Result |
|---|---|---|---|---|---|
| 2001 | Palacio de Deportes de San Pablo; Seville, Spain | (Indonesia) Tony Gunawan | (South Korea) Ha Tae-kwon (South Korea) Kim Dong-moon | 15–0, 15–13 | Gold |

=== Pan American Games ===
Men's doubles
| Year | Venue | Partner | Opponent | Score | Result |
|---|---|---|---|---|---|
| 2011 | Multipurpose Gymnasium; Guadalajara, Mexico | (United States) Sattawat Pongnairat | (United States) Howard Bach (United States) Tony Gunawan | 10–21, 14–21 | Silver |

Mixed doubles
| Year | Venue | Partner | Opponent | Score | Result |
|---|---|---|---|---|---|
| 2011 | Multipurpose Gymnasium; Guadalajara, Mexico | (United States) Eva Lee | (Canada) Toby Ng (Canada) Grace Gao | 13–21, 21–9, 17–21 | Silver |

=== Asian Games ===
Men's doubles
| Year | Venue | Partner | Opponent | Score | Result |
|---|---|---|---|---|---|
| 2002 | Gangseo Gymnasium; Busan, South Korea | (Indonesia) Tri Kusharjanto | (Thailand) Pramote Teerawiwatana (Thailand) Tesana Panvisvas | 15–17, 8–15 | Bronze |

=== Asian Championships ===
Men's doubles
| Year | Venue | Partner | Opponent | Score | Result |
|---|---|---|---|---|---|
| 1998 | Nimibutr Stadium; Bangkok, Thailand | (Indonesia) Tony Gunawan | (South Korea) Kang Kyung-jin (South Korea) Ha Tae-kwon | 15–6, 8–15, 12–15 | Bronze |
| 2002 | Nimibutr Stadium; Bangkok, Thailand | (Indonesia) Tri Kusharjanto | (South Korea) Ha Tae-kwon (South Korea) Kim Dong-moon | 6–15, 12–15 | Bronze |
| 2004 | Kuala Lumpur Badminton Stadium; Kuala Lumpur, Malaysia | (Indonesia) Candra Wijaya | (Indonesia) Sigit Budiarto (Indonesia) Tri Kusharjanto | 13–15, 5–15 | Silver |

=== BWF Grand Prix ===
The BWF Grand Prix had two levels, the Grand Prix and Grand Prix Gold. It was a series of badminton tournaments sanctioned by the Badminton World Federation (BWF) and played between 2007 and 2017. The World Badminton Grand Prix was sanctioned by the International Badminton Federation from 1983 to 2006.

Men's doubles
| Year | Tournament | Partner | Opponent | Score | Result |
|---|---|---|---|---|---|
| 1995 | Brunei Open | (Indonesia) Davis Efraim | (Indonesia) Cun Cun Haryono (Indonesia) Ade Lukas | 8–15, 15–11, 6–15 | (silver) Runner-up |
| 1995 | Sydney Open | (Indonesia) Davis Efraim | (Indonesia) Cun Cun Haryono (Indonesia) Ade Lukas | 14–18, 15–3, 15–10 | (gold) Winner |
| 1996 | Brunei Open | (Indonesia) Davis Efraim | (Indonesia) Cun Cun Haryono (Indonesia) Ade Lukas | 15–8, 4–15, 4–15 | (silver) Runner-up |
| 1996 | Indonesia Open | (Indonesia) Davis Efraim | (Indonesia) Antonius Ariantho (Indonesia) Denny Kantono | 3–15, 10–15 | (silver) Runner-up |
| 1998 | Malaysia Open | (Indonesia) Tony Gunawan | (China) Liu Yong (China) Yu Jinhao | 6–15, 15–5, 15–11 | (gold) Winner |
| 1998 | Brunei Open | (Indonesia) Tony Gunawan | (Denmark) Michael Søgaard (Indonesia) Denny Kantono | 15–2, 15–8 | (gold) Winner |
| 1998 | World Grand Prix Finals | (Indonesia) Tony Gunawan | (Indonesia) Antonius Ariantho (Indonesia) Denny Kantono | 11–15, 15–5, 11–15 | (silver) Runner-up |
| 1999 | Hong Kong Open | (Indonesia) Sigit Budiarto | (Malaysia) Cheah Soon Kit (Malaysia) Yap Kim Hock | 12–15, 12–15 | (silver) Runner-up |
| 2000 | Thailand Open | (Indonesia) Sigit Budiarto | (China) Zhang Jun (China) Zhang Wei | 5–15, 10–15 | (silver) Runner-up |
| 2000 | Dutch Open | (Indonesia) Sigit Budiarto | (Denmark) Jim Laugesen (Denmark) Michael Søgaard | 15–11, 15–4 | (gold) Winner |
| 2000 | World Grand Prix Finals | (Indonesia) Sigit Budiarto | (Indonesia) Tony Gunawan (Indonesia) Candra Wijaya | 5–7, 6–8, 2–7 | (silver) Runner-up |
| 2001 | All England Open | (Indonesia) Tony Gunawan | (Indonesia) Sigit Budiarto (Indonesia) Candra Wijaya | 15–13, 7–15, 15–7 | (gold) Winner |
| 2001 | Malaysia Open | (Indonesia) Tony Gunawan | (Indonesia) Sigit Budiarto (Indonesia) Candra Wijaya | 4–7, 7–4, 2–7, 7–2, 5–7 | (silver) Runner-up |
| 2001 | Indonesia Open | (Indonesia) Tony Gunawan | (Indonesia) Sigit Budiarto (Indonesia) Candra Wijaya | 2–7, 3–7, 5–7 | (silver) Runner-up |
| 2001 | Singapore Open | (Indonesia) Tony Gunawan | (Indonesia) Sigit Budiarto (Indonesia) Candra Wijaya | 5–7, 7–3, 7–2, 7–0 | (gold) Winner |
| 2003 | Denmark Open | (Indonesia) Candra Wijaya | (South Korea) Ha Tae-kwon (South Korea) Kim Dong-moon | 17–16, 6–15, 8–15 | (silver) Runner-up |
| 2005 | Bitburger Open | (United States) Tony Gunawan | (Canada) Mike Beres (Canada) William Milroy | 15–3, 15–6 | (gold) Winner |
| 2005 | Chinese Taipei Open | (United States) Tony Gunawan | (Denmark) Mathias Boe (Denmark) Carsten Mogensen | 15–13, 15–13 | (gold) Winner |
| 2006 | U.S. Open | (United States) Tony Gunawan | (Russia) Vitalij Durkin (Russia) Aleksandr Nikolaenko | 21–10, 21–19 | (gold) Winner |
| 2008 | U.S. Open | (United States) Raju Rai | (United States) Howard Bach (United States) Khan Malaythong | 14–21, 19–21 | (silver) Runner-up |

Mixed doubles
| Year | Tournament | Partner | Opponent | Score | Result |
|---|---|---|---|---|---|
| 1995 | Sydney Open | (Indonesia) Indarti Issolina | (Australia) Peter Blackburn (Australia) Rhonda Cator | 17–14, 15–3 | (gold) Winner |
| 2008 | U.S. Open | (United States) Peng Yun | (Canada) Mike Beres (Canada) Valerie Loker | 21–13, 21–16 | (gold) Winner |

BWF Grand Prix Gold tournament
BWF Grand Prix tournament

=== BWF International Challenge/Series/Satellite ===
Men's doubles
| Year | Tournament | Partner | Opponent | Score | Result |
|---|---|---|---|---|---|
| 1997 | French International | (Indonesia) Davis Efraim | (Indonesia) Tony Gunawan (Indonesia) Victo Wibowo | 10–15, 8–15 | (silver) Runner-up |
| 1997 | Indonesia International | (Indonesia) Davis Efraim | (Indonesia) Eng Hian (Indonesia) Hermono Yuwono | 15–5, 15–5 | (gold) Winner |
| 2009 | Santo Domingo Open | (United States) Phillip Chew | (Guatemala) Kevin Cordón (Guatemala) Rodolfo Ramírez | 23–21, 15–21, 17–21 | (silver) Runner-up |
| 2009 | Puerto Rico International | (United States) Phillip Chew | (Guatemala) Kevin Cordón (Guatemala) Rodolfo Ramírez | 19–21, 21–13, 16–21 | (silver) Runner-up |
| 2010 | Canadian International | (United States) Phillip Chew | (Netherlands) Ruud Bosch (Netherlands) Koen Ridder | 13–21, 10–21 | (silver) Runner-up |

Mixed doubles
| Year | Tournament | Partner | Opponent | Score | Result |
|---|---|---|---|---|---|
| 2010 | Brazil International | (United States) Eva Lee | (United States) Hock Lai Lee (United States) Priscilla Lun | 21–11, 22–20 | (gold) Winner |
| 2011 | Peru International | (United States) Eva Lee | (Canada) Toby Ng (Canada) Grace Gao | 11–21, 21–14, 15–21 | (silver) Runner-up |
| 2011 | Brazil International | (United States) Eva Lee | (Australia) Glenn Warfe (Australia) Leanne Choo | 21–11, 21–15 | (gold) Winner |
| 2013 | USA International | (United States) Hong Jingyu | (Canada) Toby Ng (Canada) Michelle Li | 16–21, 15–21 | (silver) Runner-up |

BWF International Challenge tournament
BWF International Series tournament

=== Invitation tournament ===
Men's doubles
| Year | Tournament | Partner | Opponent | Score | Result |
|---|---|---|---|---|---|
| 2000 | Copenhagen Masters | (Indonesia) Tony Gunawan | (Indonesia) Flandy Limpele (Indonesia) Eng Hian | 7–8, 7–5, 4–7, 7–5, 5–7 | (silver) Runner-up |
| 2003 | Copenhagen Masters | (Indonesia) Candra Wijaya | (Denmark) Lars Paaske (Denmark) Jonas Rasmussen | 15–11, 15–4 | (gold) Winner |
