= Ruud Bosch =

Dutch badminton player (born 1984)

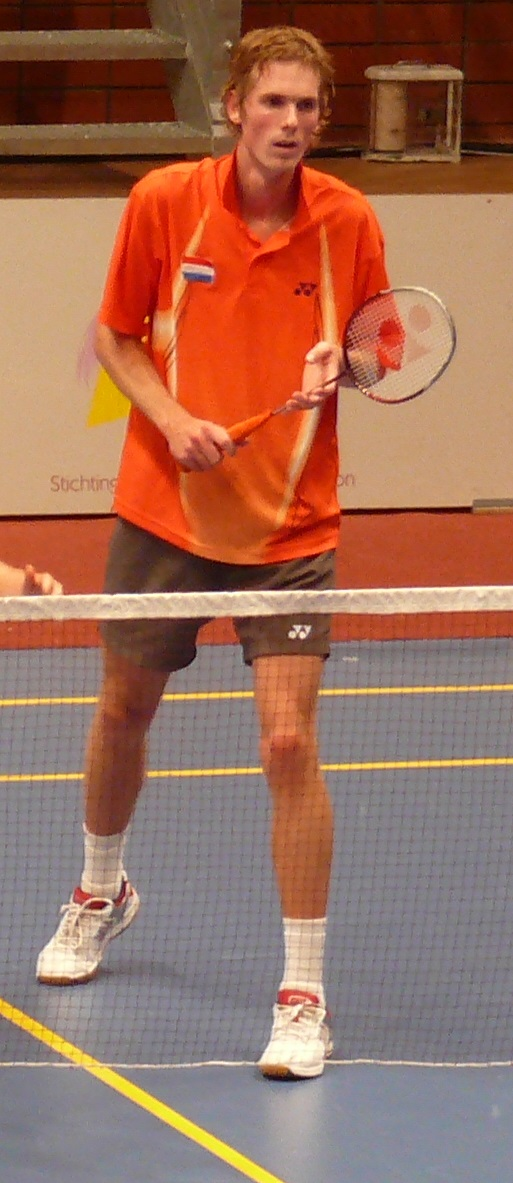
- Ruud Bosch

Personal information
- Born: Ruud Bosch; 28 July 1984 (age 42) Beuningen, Netherlands

Sport
- Country: Netherlands
- Sport: Badminton
- Handedness: Right

Men's & mixed doubles
- Highest ranking: 22 (MD 14 November 2013); 23 (XD 15 October 2009)
- BWF profile
Medal record
Men's badminton
Representing Netherlands
European Mixed Team Championships
| Silver medal – second place | 2006 Den Bosch | Mixed team |
European Junior Championships
| Bronze medal – third place | 2003 Esbjerg | Boys' doubles |

Ruud Bosch (born 28 July 1984) is a Dutch former badminton player. He is a doubles specialist. He became a member of the Netherlands national badminton team in 2004, then in 2006, he won a silver medal at the European Badminton Mixed Team Championships. After quitting the men's doubles combination with Koen Ridder after eight years in August 2014, Bosch moved to Taiwan to form a new combination with Tien Tzu-Chieh in men's doubles and Shuai Pei-ling in mixed doubles.

After two years in Taiwan, he returned to Europe to play again in the German Bundesliga for Union Lüdinghausen club. He won the Dutch National Badminton Championships seven times, four times in the men's doubles (2006, 2009, 2011 and 2013) and three times in the mixed doubles (2008, 2011 and 2013). In December 2018, Bosch was appointed as head coach of the Netherlands and in October 2023 his contract at Badminton Nederland was terminated.

== Achievements ==
=== European Junior Championships ===
Boys' doubles
| Year | Venue | Partner | Opponent | Score | Result |
|---|---|---|---|---|---|
| 2003 | Esbjerg Badminton Center; Esbjerg, Denmark | (Netherlands) Dave Khodabux | (Denmark) Søren Frandsen (Denmark) Mads Hallas | 5–15, 15–8, 6–15 | Bronze |

=== BWF International Challenge/Series ===
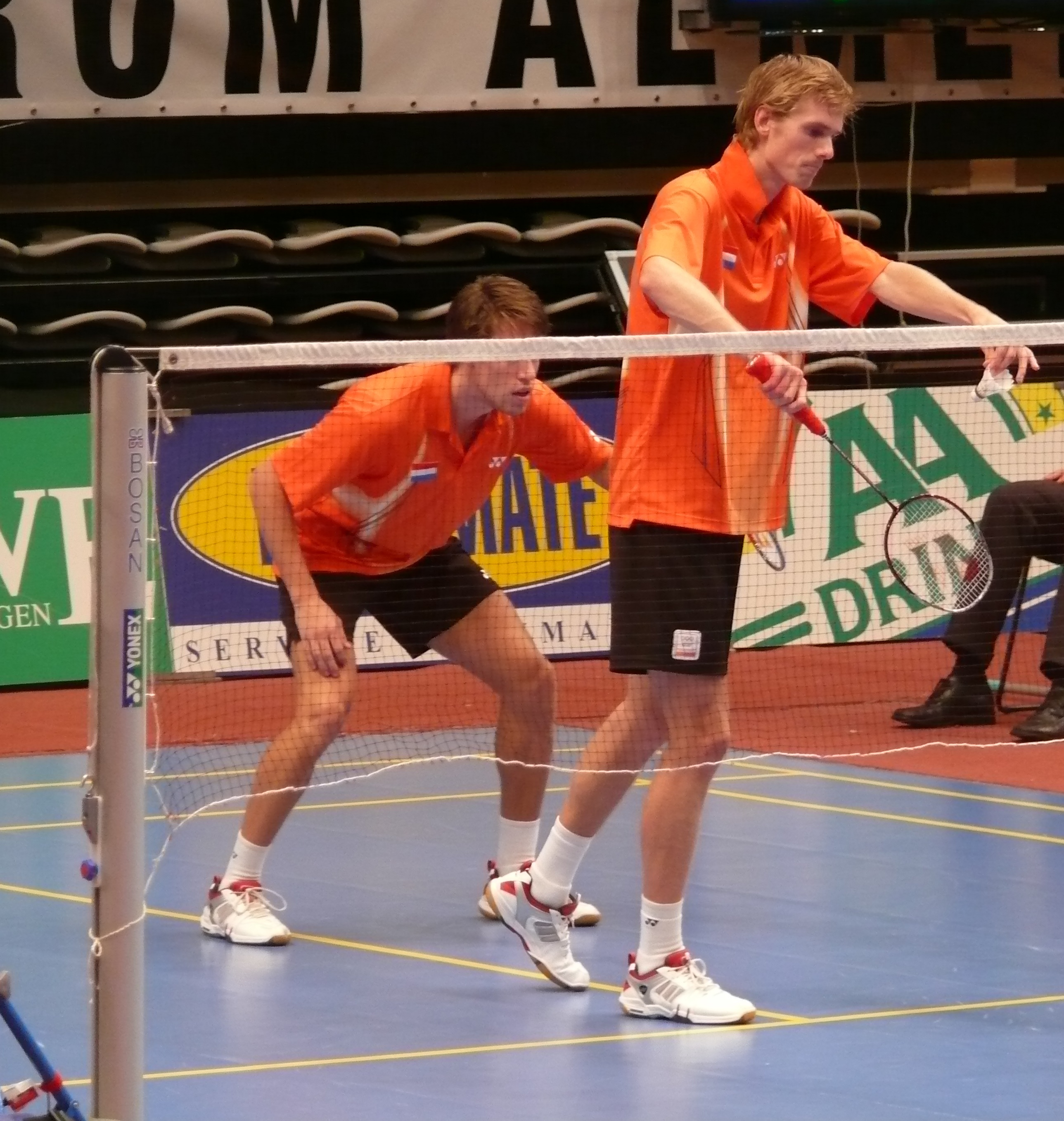
Ruud Bosch en Koen Ridder (NED)

Men's doubles
| Year | Tournament | Partner | Opponent | Score | Result |
|---|---|---|---|---|---|
| 2008 | Portugal International | (Netherlands) Koen Ridder | (India) Rupesh Kumar K. T. (India) Sanave Thomas | 21–19, 22–20 | (gold) Winner |
| 2008 | Norwegian International | (Netherlands) Koen Ridder | (Germany) Michael Fuchs (Germany) Ingo Kindervater | 18–21, 21–19, 8–21 | (silver) Runner-up |
| 2009 | Belgian International | (Netherlands) Koen Ridder | (England) Marcus Ellis (England) Peter Mills | 30–28, 21–12 | (gold) Winner |
| 2009 | Dutch International | (Netherlands) Koen Ridder | (Denmark) Mads Conrad-Petersen (Denmark) Mads Pieler Kolding | 14–21, 20–22 | (silver) Runner-up |
| 2010 | Canadian International | (Netherlands) Koen Ridder | (United States) Phillip Chew (United States) Halim Haryanto | 21–13, 21–10 | (gold) Winner |
| 2010 | Slovenian International | (Netherlands) Koen Ridder | (Croatia) Zvonimir Đurkinjak (Croatia) Zvonimir Hölbling | 21–17, 21–15 | (gold) Winner |
| 2010 | Spanish International | (Netherlands) Koen Ridder | (Germany) Peter Käsbauer (Germany) Oliver Roth | 13–21, 14–21 | (silver) Runner-up |
| 2012 | Hungarian International | (Netherlands) Jim Middelburg | (Croatia) Zvonimir Đurkinjak (Croatia) Zvonimir Hölbling | 17–21, 21–19, 21–16 | (gold) Winner |
| 2012 | Norwegian International | (Netherlands) Koen Ridder | (Netherlands) Jacco Arends (Netherlands) Jelle Maas | 21–18, 20–22, 21–17 | (gold) Winner |
| 2013 | Swedish Masters | (Netherlands) Koen Ridder | (Netherlands) Jacco Arends (Netherlands) Jelle Maas | 21–16, 16–21, 13–21 | (silver) Runner-up |
| 2013 | Peru International | (Netherlands) Koen Ridder | (United States) Phillip Chew (United States) Sattawat Pongnairat | 21–18, 21–11 | (gold) Winner |
| 2013 | Tahiti International | (Netherlands) Koen Ridder | (France) Laurent Constantin (France) Matthieu Lo Ying Ping | 21–13, 21–10 | (gold) Winner |
| 2014 | Auckland International | (Chinese Taipei) Tien Tzu-chieh | (Chinese Taipei) Po Li-wei (Chinese Taipei) Yang Ming-tse | 11–8, 11–5, 8–11, 9–11, 6–11 | (silver) Runner-up |

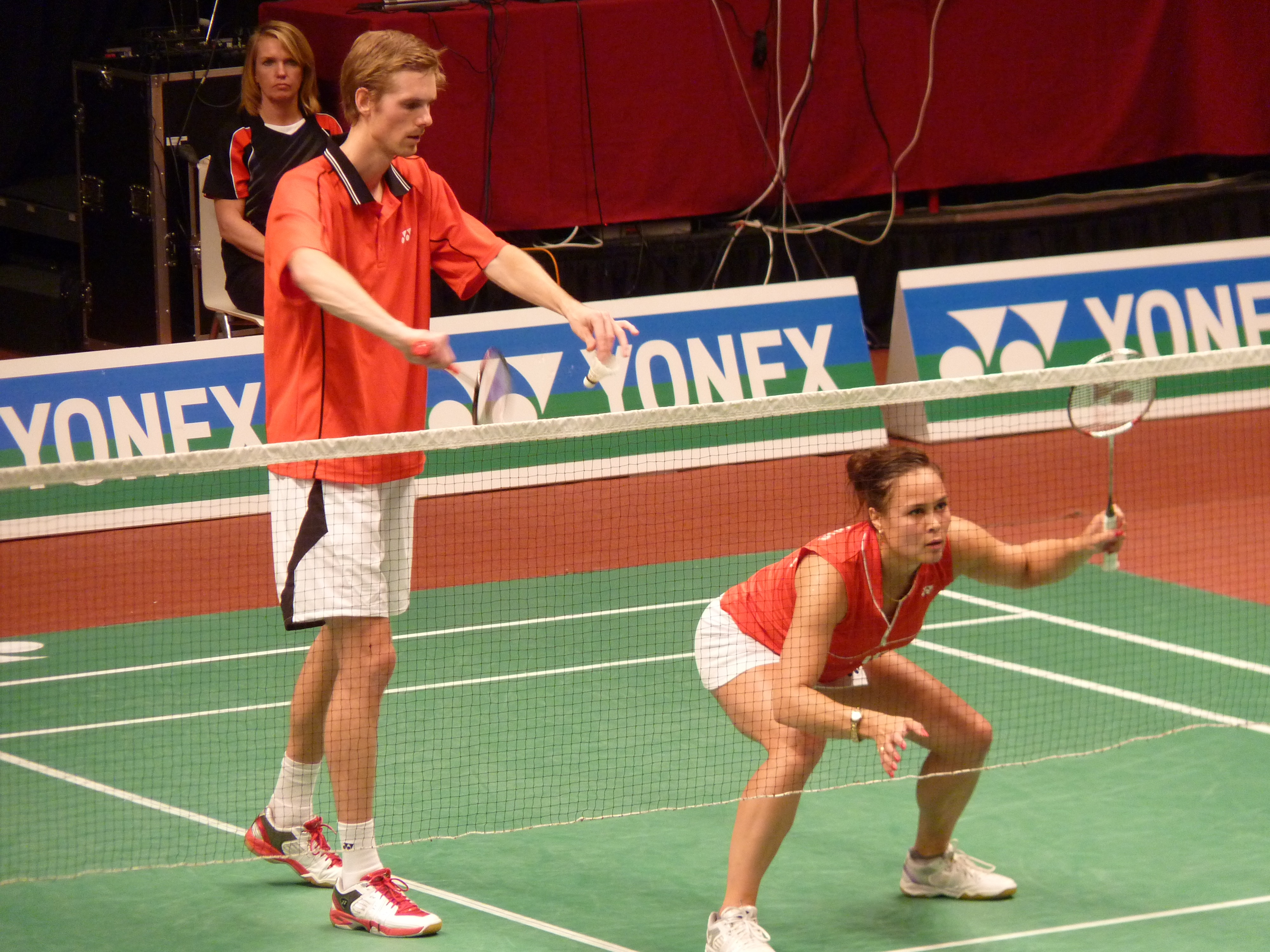
Ruud Bosch and Lotte Jonathans

Mixed doubles
| Year | Tournament | Partner | Opponent | Score | Result |
|---|---|---|---|---|---|
| 2013 | Tahiti International | (Thailand) Salakjit Ponsana | (France) Laurent Constantin (France) Teshana Vignes Waran | 21–18, 21–15 | (gold) Winner |
| 2014 | Auckland International | (Chinese Taipei) Shuai Pei-ling | (Chinese Taipei) Lee Chia-han (Chinese Taipei) Lee Chia-hsin | 6–11, 6–11, 8–11 | (silver) Runner-up |

BWF International Challenge tournament
BWF International Series tournament
BWF Future Series tournament
