= Jenny Karlsson =

Swedish badminton player

Personal information
- Born: Jenny Maria Karlsson; 2 January 1975 (age 51) Sävar, Umeå Municipality, Sweden
- Height: 1.74 m (5 ft 9 in)
- Weight: 69 kg (152 lb)

Sport
- Country: Sweden
- Sport: Badminton
- Handedness: Right
- Event: Women's & mixed doubles

Women's & mixed doubles
- BWF profile

Jenny Maria Karlsson (born 2 January 1975) is a Swedish badminton player who competed at the 2000 Summer Olympics. Karlsson who played in the women's and mixed doubles event, had won five titles at the Swedish National Championships, and also won the mixed doubles title at the Nordic Championships in 1999.

== Achievements ==
=== IBF World Grand Prix ===
The World Badminton Grand Prix sanctioned by International Badminton Federation (IBF) since 1983.

Mixed doubles

| Year | Tournament | Partner | Opponent | Score | Result |
|---|---|---|---|---|---|
| 2000 | Swedish Open | (Sweden) Fredrik Bergström | (Denmark) Jonas Rasmussen (Denmark) Jane F. Bramsen | 6–15, 14–17 | (silver) Runner-up |

=== IBF International ===
Women's doubles

| Year | Tournament | Partner | Opponent | Score | Result |
|---|---|---|---|---|---|
| 1996 | Norwegian International | (Sweden) Johanna Holgersson | (Denmark) Pernille Harder (Denmark) Mette Schjoldager | 9–4, 0–9, 7–9, 8–9 | (silver) Runner-up |

Mixed doubles

| Year | Tournament | Partner | Opponent | Score | Result |
|---|---|---|---|---|---|
| 2002 | Portugal International | (Sweden) Fredrik Bergström | (Denmark) Carsten Mogensen (Denmark) Kamilla Rytter Juhl | 7–3, 2–7, 7–4, 7–4 | (gold) Winner |
| 1999 | Spanish International | (Sweden) Fredrik Bergström | (England) Ian Sullivan (England) Gail Emms | 15–7, 13–15, 10–15 | (silver) Runner-up |
| 1999 | Iceland International | (Sweden) Fredrik Bergström | (Sweden) Henrik Andersson (Sweden) Anna Lundin | 15–0, 15–7 | (gold) Winner |
| 1998 | Norwegian International | (Sweden) Fredrik Bergström | (Denmark) Lars Paaske (Denmark) Jane F. Bramsen | 15–8, 10–15, 5–15 | (silver) Runner-up |
| 1997 | Irish International | (Sweden) Fredrik Bergström | (England) Nathan Robertson (England) Joanne Wright | 18–14, 11–15, 14–17 | (silver) Runner-up |
| 1997 | Norwegian International | (Sweden) Fredrik Bergström | (Denmark) Steen Thygesen-Poulsen (Denmark) Jane F. Bramsen | 3–9, 9–5, 6–9, 4–9 | (silver) Runner-up |
