= 1995 European Junior Badminton Championships =

Badminton championships

Tournament details
- Dates: 9 – 15 April
- Edition: 14th
- Venue: Športová hala Olympia
- Location: Nitra, Slovakia

The 1995 European Junior Badminton Championships was the 14th tournament of the European Junior Badminton Championships. It was held in Nitra, Slovakia, in the month of April. Danish players dominated with four titles in both Boys' events, Mixed doubles and Mixed team championships while Nederlands won Girls' singles and England secured the Girls' doubles title.

== Medalists ==
Discipline	Gold	Silver	Bronze
Boys' singles	(Denmark) Peter Gade	(England) Mark Constable	(Netherlands) Dennis Lens
Boys' singles	(Denmark) Peter Gade	(England) Mark Constable	(Denmark) Kasper Ødum
Girls' singles	(Netherlands) Brenda Beenhakker	(Denmark) Mette Justesen	(Denmark) Pernille Harder
Girls' singles	(Netherlands) Brenda Beenhakker	(Denmark) Mette Justesen	(Russia) Elena Sukhareva
Boys' doubles	(Denmark) Peter Gade (Denmark) Peder Nissen	(Denmark) Jonas Rasmussen (Denmark) Søren Hansen	(Sweden) Henrik Andersson (Sweden) Björn Logius
Boys' doubles	(Denmark) Peter Gade (Denmark) Peder Nissen	(Denmark) Jonas Rasmussen (Denmark) Søren Hansen	(Bulgaria) Todor Velkov (Bulgaria) Boris Kessov
Girls' doubles	(England) Joanne Wright (England) Donna Kellogg	(Russia) Ella Karachkova (Russia) Natalia Djachkova	(England) Gail Emms (England) Ella Miles
Girls' doubles	(England) Joanne Wright (England) Donna Kellogg	(Russia) Ella Karachkova (Russia) Natalia Djachkova	(Denmark) Mette Hansen (Denmark) Mette Schjoldager
Mixed doubles	(Denmark) Peder Nissen (Denmark) Mette Hansen	(Denmark) Jonas Rasmussen (Denmark) Pernille Harder	(England) Ian Sullivan (England) Joanne Wright
Mixed doubles	(Denmark) Peder Nissen (Denmark) Mette Hansen	(Denmark) Jonas Rasmussen (Denmark) Pernille Harder	(Sweden) Henrik Andersson (Sweden) Anna Lundin
Mixed team	Denmark	Sweden	England

== Medal table ==
Rank	Nation	Gold	Silver	Bronze	Total
1	Denmark (DEN)	4	3	3	10
2	England (ENG)	1	1	3	5
3	Netherlands (NED)	1	0	1	2
4	Sweden (SWE)	0	1	2	3
5	Russia (RUS)	0	1	1	2
6	Bulgaria (BUL)	0	0	1	1
Totals (6 entries)		6	6	11	23

== Results ==
=== Semi-finals ===
- Source

Category	Winner	Runner-up	Score
Boys' singles	(Denmark) Peter Gade	(Netherlands) Dennis Lens	15–2, 15–7
Boys' singles	(England) Mark Constable	(Denmark) Kasper Ødum	15–9, 15–6
Girls' singles	(Netherlands) Brenda Beenhakker	(Denmark) Pernille Harder	11–3, 11–8
Girls' singles	(Denmark) Mette Justesen	(Russia) Elena Sukhareva	–, –
Boys' doubles	(Denmark) Peter Gade (Denmark) Peder Nissen	(Sweden) Henrik Andersson (Sweden) Björn Logius	15–4, 15–5
Boys' doubles	(Denmark) Søren Hansen (Denmark) Jonas Rasmussen	(Bulgaria) Boris Kessov (Bulgaria) Todor Velkov	15–5, 17–15
Girls' doubles	(Russia) Natalia Djachkova (Russia) Ella Karachkova	(England) Gail Emms (England) Ella Miles	–, –
Girls' doubles	(England) Donna Kellogg (England) Joanne Wright	(Denmark) Mette Hansen (Denmark) Mette Schjoldager	15–11, 15–5
Mixed doubles	(Denmark) Jonas Rasmussen (Denmark) Pernille Harder	(Sweden) Henrik Andersson (Sweden) Anna Lundin	15–9, 15–8
Mixed doubles	(Denmark) Peder Nissen (Denmark) Mette Hansen	(England) Ian Sullivan (England) Joanne Wright	15–9, 12–15, 15–6

=== Final ===
Category	Winners	Runners-up	Score
Boys' singles	(Denmark) Peter Gade	(England) Mark Constable	15–9, 12–15, 15–8
Girls' singles	(Netherlands) Brenda Beenhakker	(Denmark) Mette Justesen	11–0, 4–11, 12–10
Boys' doubles	(Denmark) Peder Nissen (Denmark) Peter Gade	(Denmark) Jonas Rasmussen (Denmark) Søren Hansen	15–6, 15–6
Girls' doubles	(England) Donna Kellogg (England) Joanne Wright	(Russia) Ella Karachkova (Russia) Natalia Djachkova	15–7, 18–13
Mixed doubles	(Denmark) Peder Nissen (Denmark) Mette Hansen	(Denmark) Jonas Rasmussen (Denmark) Pernille Harder	15–5, 15–4
