= Judith Meulendijks =

Dutch badminton player (born 1978)

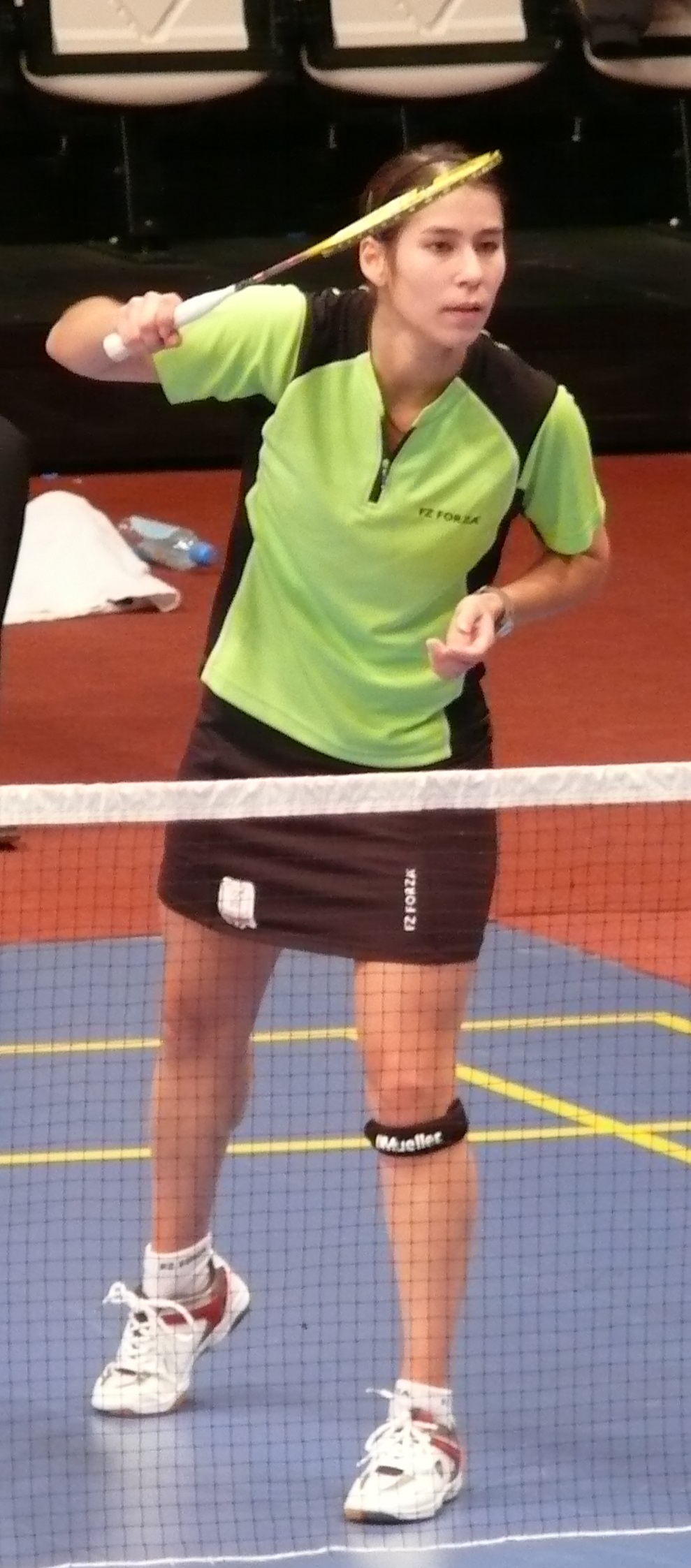
- Judith Meulendijks

Personal information
- Born: 26 September 1978 (age 47) Helmond, Netherlands
- Height: 1.69 m (5 ft 7 in)
- Weight: 64 kg (141 lb)

Sport
- Country: Netherlands
- Sport: Badminton

Women's singles & doubles
- Highest ranking: 19 (WS, 22 October 2009); 32 (WD, 21 January 2010)
- BWF profile
Medal record
Women's badminton
Representing Netherlands
Uber Cup
Silver medal – second place	2006 Sendai & Tokyo	Women's team
Bronze medal – third place	2002 Guangzhou	Women's team
European Women's Team Championships
Gold medal – first place	2006 Thessalonica	Women's team
Silver medal – second place	2008 Almere	Women's team
Bronze medal – third place	2012 Amsterdam	Women's team
European Junior Championships
Gold medal – first place	1997 Nymburk	Girls' singles
Bronze medal – third place	1997 Nymburk	Mixed team

Judith Meulendijks (born 26 September 1978) is a Dutch badminton player.

== Career ==
Meulendijks started playing badminton at the BC Phoenix in her hometown and then she went to BC Geldrop. In her junior career, she won 1994 Dutch junior championships in the girls' doubles partnered with Antoinette Achterberg, and in 1995 in the mixed doubles with Dicky Palyama. In 1996, she elected to join the national team, and in the same year, she won the national women's singles title. In 2007, she won the gold medal at the European Junior Championships in the girls' singles event, and also became the first of world-class junior players to make a mark on the International Badminton Federation tournament circuit when she took the women's singles title at the Dutch Open.

In 2000, she competed at the Sydney Olympics in women's singles and was beaten in round 32 by Ye Zhaoying, of China, 11-3, 9-11, 11-7. Meulendijks was a part of the Dutch team who won the 2002 bronze and 2006 silver at the Uber Cup.

She won the Dutch National Badminton Championships three times in the Women's singles category (1996, 2008 & 2012) and the Women's doubles two times (2006 & 2007) with Brenda Beenhakker. She ended her international singles career in style reaching the finals at her home Dutch Open event in 2012 where she lost to Czech player Kristina Gavnholt. She played for many clubs in the Netherlands (BC Phoenix, BC Geldrop, Pellikaan Tilburg, BC Nuenen, BCO Bali & BC Duinwijck), Germany (FC Langenfeld & Bayer Uerdingen with which she won the German Bundesliga title in 2002 & 2003) and Denmark (Team Aarhus & Vendsyssel). She now is a badminton coach in Switzerland.

== Major achievements ==
Year	Venue/Tournament	Event	Result
Uber Cup
2006	Sendai and Tokyo, Japan	Women's team	2
2002	Guangzhou, China	Women's team	3
European Women's Team Championships
2012	Amsterdam, Netherlands	Women's team	3
2008	Almere, Netherlands	Women's team	2
2006	Thessalonica, Greece	Women's team	1
European Junior Championships
1997	Nymburk, Czech Republic	Girls' singles	1
BWF Grand Prix
2012	Dutch Open	Women's singles	2
2010	U.S. Open	Women's singles	2
2009	Dutch Open	Women's singles	2
2007	Dutch Open	Women's singles	2
BWF International Challenge/Series
2012	Belgian International	Women's doubles ( (Germany) Johanna Goliszewski)	2
2012	French International	Women's singles	1
2012	French International	Women's doubles ( (Germany) Johanna Goliszewski)	1
2012	Estonian International	Women's singles	1
2011	Scottish International	Women's singles	1
2010	Turkey International	Women's singles	1
2010	Spanish International	Women's singles	2
2009	Finnish Open	Women's singles	2
2008	Czech International	Women's singles	2
2007	Spanish International	Women's singles	2
2007	Portugal International	Women's singles	1
IBF World Grand Prix
2006	Macau Open	Women's singles	1
1997	Dutch Open	Women's singles	1
Other International Championships
2006	Spanish International	Women's singles	2
2005	Scottish Open	Women's singles	2
2003	French Open	Women's singles	2
2003	Portugal International	Women's singles	2
2001	Croatian International	Women's singles	2
2000	BMW Open	Women's singles	2
1999	BMW Open	Women's singles	2
1998	Amor International	Women's singles	1
1998	BMW Open	Women's doubles ( (Netherlands) Erica van den Heuvel)	1
1997	Welsh International	Women's singles	2
1997	Austrian International	Women's singles	1
