= Ian Sullivan =

English badminton player

Personal information
- Born: 17 December 1977 (age 48) Gloucester, England

Sport
- Country: England
- Sport: Badminton
- Handedness: Left
- BWF profile
Medal record
Men's badminton
Representing England
European Junior Championships
Bronze medal – third place	1995 Nitra	Mixed doubles
Bronze medal – third place	1995 Nitra	Mixed team

Ian Martin Sullivan (born 17 December 1977) is an English former badminton international player and an English National doubles champion.

== Biography ==
Sullivan affiliated with Gloucestershire, and became an English National doubles champion after winning the English National Championships mixed doubles title with Gail Emms in 2000.

== Achievements ==
=== European Junior Championships ===
Mixed doubles
Year	Venue	Partner	Opponent	Score	Result
1995	Športová hala Olympia, Nitra, Slovakia	(England) Joanne Wright	(Denmark) Peder Nissen (Denmark) Mette Hansen	9–15, 15–12, 6–15	Bronze

=== IBF World Grand Prix ===
The World Badminton Grand Prix has been sanctioned by the International Badminton Federation from 1983 to 2006.

Men's doubles
Year	Tournament	Partner	Opponent	Score	Result
2000	U.S. Open	(England) Anthony Clark	(England) James Anderson (England) Graham Hurrell	14–17, 11–15	(silver) Runner-up

Mixed doubles
Year	Tournament	Partner	Opponent	Score	Result
2000	U.S. Open	(England) Gail Emms	(Denmark) Jonas Rasmussen (Denmark) Jane F. Bramsen	15–8, 11–15, 12–15	(silver) Runner-up
2000	German Open	(England) Gail Emms	(Denmark) Jonas Rasmussen (Denmark) Jane F. Bramsen	3–15, 15–7, 4–15	(silver) Runner-up

=== IBF International ===
Men's doubles
Year	Tournament	Partner	Opponent	Score	Result
1997	La Chaux-de-Fonds International	(England) Anthony Clark	(Germany) Michael Helber (Germany) Björn Siegemund	12–15, 17–18	(silver) Runner-up
1997	Czech International	(England) James Anderson	(England) Steve Isaac (England) Neil Waterman	7–9, 9–4, 5–1 retired	(gold) Winner
1997	Welsh International	(England) James Anderson	(Netherlands) Dennis Lens (Netherlands) Quinten van Dalm	15–5, 15–4	(gold) Winner
1997	Irish International	(England) James Anderson	(England) Graham Hurrell (England) Peter Jeffrey	15–2, 10–15, 15–7	(gold) Winner
1998	Slovak International	(England) Anthony Clark	(England) Graham Hurrell (England) Peter Jeffrey	15–8, 12–15, 7–15	(silver) Runner-up
1998	Scottish International	(England) Anthony Clark	(Denmark) Michael Lamp (Denmark) Martin Lundgaard Hansen	10–15, 5–15	(silver) Runner-up
1999	French International	(England) Anthony Clark	(Poland) Michał Łogosz (Poland) Robert Mateusiak	15–11, 15–10	(gold) Winner
1999	Italian International	(England) Anthony Clark	(Japan) Takaaki Hayashi (Japan) Katsuya Nishiyama	15–6, 15–9	(gold) Winner
2000	Welsh International	(England) Anthony Clark	(Denmark) Kristian Langbak (Denmark) Jesper Thomsen	8–6, 1–7, 7–0	(gold) Winner
2002	Spanish International	(England) Graham Hurrell	(France) Vincent Laigle (France) Svetoslav Stoyanov	3–7, 7–2, 4–7	(silver) Runner-up

Mixed doubles
Year	Tournament	Partner	Opponent	Score	Result
1996	Hungarian International	(England) Joanne Wright	(Denmark) Jonas Rasmussen (Denmark) Ann-Lou Jørgensen	5–15, 11–15	(silver) Runner-up
1997	Czech International	(England) Gail Emms	(Sweden) Henrik Andersson (Sweden) Johanna Persson	11–8, 9–4, 9–3	(gold) Winner
1997	Welsh International	(England) Gail Emms	(England) James Anderson (England) Sara Sankey	6–15, 14–17	(silver) Runner-up
1998	Czech International	(England) Gail Emms	(England) Anthony Clark (England) Lorraine Cole	4–15, 13–15	(silver) Runner-up
1998	Scottish International	(England) Gail Emms	(Denmark) Michael Lamp (Denmark) Mette Schjoldager	10–15, 15–11, 12–15	(silver) Runner-up
1999	Portugal International	(England) Gail Emms	(Germany) Björn Siegemund (Germany) Karen Neumann	11–15, 15–12, 8–15	(silver) Runner-up
1999	French International	(England) Gail Emms	(China) Chen Gang (China) Qin Yiyuan	12–15, 12–15	(silver) Runner-up
1999	Spanish International	(England) Gail Emms	(Sweden) Fredrik Bergström (Sweden) Jenny Karlsson	7–15, 15–13, 15–10	(gold) Winner
1999	Italian International	(China) Han Jingna	(England) Anthony Clark (China) Zeng Yaqiong	15–11, 15–7	(gold) Winner
