= Brenda Beenhakker =

Dutch badminton player

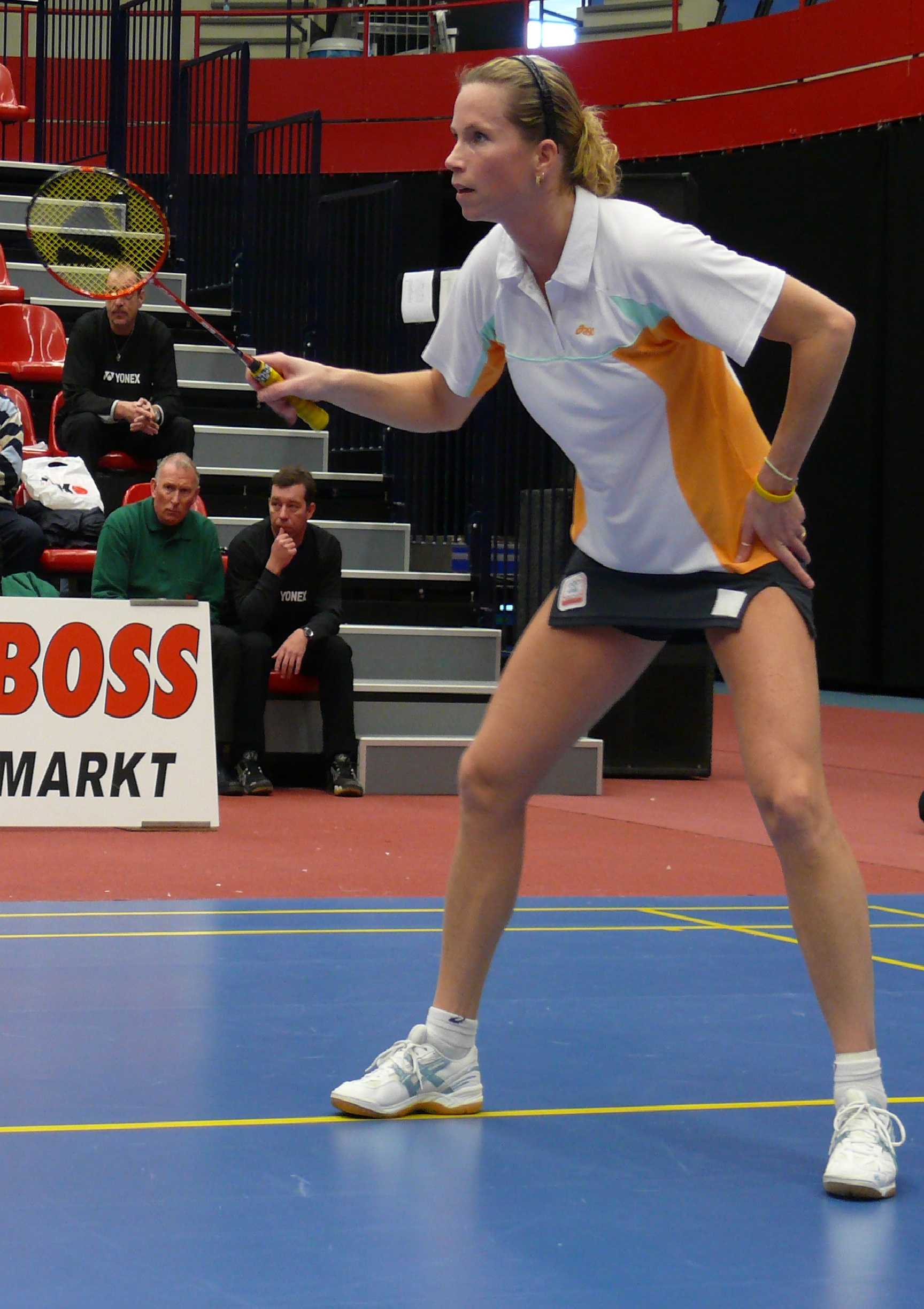

Personal information
- Nickname: Big Brenda
- Born: 18 February 1977 (age 49) Arnhem, Gelderland, Netherlands
- Height: 1.79 m (5 ft 10 in)

Sport
- Country: Netherlands
- Sport: Badminton
- Handedness: Right

Women's singles & doubles
- Career record: 172 wins, 120 losses
- BWF profile
Medal record
Women's badminton
Representing Netherlands
Uber Cup
Bronze medal – third place	2002 Guangzhou	Women's team
European Championships
Bronze medal – third place	2002 Malmö	Women's singles
European Mixed Team Championships
Silver medal – second place	2004 Geneva	Mixed team
Silver medal – second place	2006 Den Bosch	Mixed team
Bronze medal – third place	2002 Malmö	Mixed team
European Women's Team Championships
Gold medal – first place	2006 Thessaloniki	Women's team
European Junior Championships
Gold medal – first place	1995 Nitra	Girls' singles

Brenda Beenhakker (born 18 February 1977) is a retired Dutch badminton player. She is the former European junior champion in the girls' singles event in 1995. She won Dutch National Championships for 8 times; 5 times in singles (1995, 1997, 1998, 1999, 2000) and 3 times in doubles (2005 – with Karina de Wit, 2006 & 2007 – with Judith Meulendijks).

== Career ==
Beenhakker surprised as a seventeen-year-old junior in 1995 by becoming women's singles Dutch National champion. When she was eleven, she became the Dutch junior champion for the first time. Hereafter several youth titles in her and higher age categories followed. A few months after her first championship with seniors in 1995, she was also crowned as European Junior Champion, becoming the first ever Dutch to win the girls' singles title. Beenhakker played badminton for BC Smashing (Wijchen) in the Dutch premier league. She won a bronze medal at the 2002 European Badminton Championships in Malmö, Sweden. She stopped playing international tournaments in April 2006, after a badminton career lasting for 19 years.

The Arnhem player started badminton when she was ten years old, after having been interested in playing tennis before. Beenhakker is married, has a daughter and has been working at a childcare center in Wijchen since 2008. As of 2009/10 season, she succeeded Frans Rademaker as trainer of BC Smashing. She had also given training at the Dutch clubs BECA Arnhem and BC Mariken in Nijmegen.

== Achievements ==
=== European Championships ===
Women's singles
Year	Venue	Opponent	Score	Result
2002	Baltiska hallen Malmö, Sweden	(Netherlands) Mia Audina	1–7, 6–8, 1–7	Bronze

=== European Junior Championships ===
Girls' singles
Year	Venue	Opponent	Score	Result
1995	Športová hala Olympia; Nitra, Slovakia	(Denmark) Mette Justesen	11–0, 4–11, 12–10	Gold

=== IBF International ===
Women's singles
Year	Tournament	Opponent	Score	Result
1995	Welsh International	(Russia) Elena Rybkina	4–11, 6–11	(silver) Runner-up
1997	Austrian International	(Netherlands) Judith Meulendijks	1–11, 11–8, 9–12	(silver) Runner-up
1997	Welsh International	(Netherlands) Judith Meulendijks	11–4, 11–6	(gold) Winner
1999	Australian International	(France) Sandra Dimbour	3–11, 5–11	(silver) Runner-up
2001	French International	(Denmark) Tine Rasmussen	7–2, 8–6, 5–7, 7–1	(gold) Winner
2001	Welsh International	(Sweden) Sara Persson	7–5, 7–5, 7–0	(gold) Winner
2002	Dutch International	(Netherlands) Karina de Wit	7–5, 7–0, 7–4	(gold) Winner
2003	Dutch International	(Poland) Kamila Augustyn	5–11, 4–11	(silver) Runner-up
2005	USA SCBA International	(Japan) Miyo Akao	7–11, 11–7, 11–2	(gold) Winner

Women's doubles
Year	Tournament	Partner	Opponent	Score	Result
2005	Finnish International	(Netherlands) Paulien van Dooremalen	(Germany) Sandra Marinello (Germany) Kathrin Piotrowski	11–15, 1–15	(silver) Runner-up
