= Dennis Lens =

Dutch badminton player

Personal information
- Born: Dennis Paul Andrew Lens; 25 September 1977 (age 49) Heemskerk, North Holland, Netherlands
- Height: 1.82 m (6 ft 0 in)
- Weight: 73 kg (161 lb)

Sport
- Country: Netherlands
- Sport: Badminton
- Handedness: Right
- Event: Men's singles and doubles

Men's singles and doubles
- BWF profile
Medal record
Men's badminton
Representing Netherlands
European Championships
Bronze medal – third place	2000 Glasgow	Mixed team
European Junior Championships
Bronze medal – third place	1995 Nitra	Boys' singles

Dennis Paul Andrew Lens (born 25 September 1977) is a Dutch former badminton player. He competed at the 2000 Summer Olympics in the men's doubles event partnered with Quinten van Dalm. Lens won the boys' singles bronze at the 1995 European Junior Championships in Nitra, and was part of the Netherlands national team that won the mixed team bronze at the 2000 European Championships in Glasgow. He had collected 10 times national titles, 9 in the men's doubles event and once in the mixed doubles event.

== Achievements ==
=== European Junior Championships ===
Boys' singles
Year	Venue	Opponent	Score	Result
1995	Športová hala Olympia; Nitra, Slovakia	(Denmark) Peter Gade	2–15, 7–15	Bronze

=== IBF World Grand Prix ===
The World Badminton Grand Prix has been sanctioned by the International Badminton Federation from 1983 to 2006.

Mixed doubles
Year	Tournament	Partner	Opponent	Score	Result
1996	Hamburg Cup	(Netherlands) Erica van den Heuvel	(Denmark) Jonas Rasmussen (Denmark) Ann-Lou Jørgensen	15–8, 14–17, 11–15	(silver) Runner-up

=== IBF International ===
Men's doubles
Year	Tournament	Partner	Opponent	Score	Result
1997	Amor International	(Netherlands) Quinten van Dalm	(Denmark) Peder Nissen (Denmark) Jonas Rasmussen	11–10, 6–9, 8–11, 9–5, 4–9	(silver) Runner-up
1997	Austrian International	(Netherlands) Quinten van Dalm	(England) Anthony Clark (England) Ian Pearson	17–16, 11–15, 7–15	(silver) Runner-up
1997	Hungarian International	(Netherlands) Quinten van Dalm	(Bulgaria) Mihail Popov (Bulgaria) Svetoslav Stoyanov	6–9, 5–9, 4–9	(silver) Runner-up
1997	Welsh International	(Netherlands) Quinten van Dalm	(England) James Anderson (England) Ian Sullivan	5–15, 4–15	(silver) Runner-up
1998	Amor International	(Netherlands) Joris van Soerland	(Denmark) Joachim Fischer Nielsen (Denmark) Kasper Ødum	15–10, 8–15, 5–15	(silver) Runner-up
1999	BMW International	(Netherlands) Quinten van Dalm	(Ukraine) Vladislav Druzchenko (Ukraine) Valeriy Streltsov	15–9, 11–15, 15–13	(gold) Winner

Mixed doubles
Year	Tournament	Partner	Opponent	Score	Result
1998	Amor International	(Netherlands) Nicole van Hooren	(Netherlands) Norbert van Barneveld (Netherlands) Lotte Jonathans	18–15, 15–12	(gold) Winner
2002	Austrian International	(Sweden) Johanna Persson	(Denmark) Kasper Kiim Jensen (Denmark) Helle Nielsen	6–8, 8–7, 7–4, 8–6	(gold) Winner
