= James Anderson (badminton) =

English badminton player

Personal information
- Born: 15 February 1974 (age 52)
- Height: 1.77 m (5 ft 10 in)
- Weight: 79 kg (174 lb)

Sport
- Country: England
- Sport: Badminton
- Handedness: Right
- BWF profile
Medal record
Men's badminton
Representing England
Commonwealth Games
Gold medal – first place	2002 Manchester	Mixed team
Bronze medal – third place	2002 Manchester	Men's doubles
European Mixed Team Championships
Silver medal – second place	2000 Glasgow	Mixed team
European Junior Championships
Bronze medal – third place	1991 Budapest	Boys' doubles

James Anderson (born 15 February 1974) is a retired English badminton player. He was part of the English national team that won the gold medal in the mixed team event, and a bronze medal in the men's doubles at the 2002 Commonwealth Games. Anderson competed in the national event for Essex team.

== Achievements ==
=== Commonwealth Games ===
Men's doubles
Year	Venue	Partner	Opponent	Score	Result
2002	Bolton Arena, Manchester, England	(England) Simon Archer	(Malaysia) Chan Chong Ming (Malaysia) Chew Choon Eng	4–7, 5–7, 2–7	Bronze

=== World Junior Championships ===
The Bimantara World Junior Championships was an international invitation badminton tournament for junior players. It was held in Jakarta, Indonesia from 1987 to 1991.

Boys' doubles
Year	Venue	Partner	Opponent	Score	Result
1991	Istora Senayan, Jakarta, Indonesia	(England) Ian Pearson	(Indonesia) Bambang Suyono (Indonesia) Candra Wijaya	4–15, 9–15	Bronze

=== European Junior Championships ===
Boys' doubles
Year	Venue	Partner	Opponent	Score	Result
1991	BMTE-Törley impozáns sportcsarnokában, Budapest, Hungary	(England) Ian Pearson	(Denmark) Peter Christensen (Denmark) Martin Lundgaard Hansen	7–15, 1–15	Bronze

=== IBF World Grand Prix ===
The World Badminton Grand Prix sanctioned by International Badminton Federation (IBF) since 1983.

Men's doubles
Year	Tournament	Partner	Opponent	Score	Result
1999	U.S. Open	(England) Graham Hurrell	(Denmark) Michael Lamp (Denmark) Jonas Rasmussen	10–15, 13–15	(silver) Runner-up
2000	U.S. Open	(England) Graham Hurrell	(England) Anthony Clark (England) Ian Sullivan	17–14, 15–11	(gold) Winner

=== IBF International ===
Men's doubles
Year	Tournament	Partner	Opponent	Score	Result
1993	Czech International	(England) Ian Pearson	(England) Neil Cottrill (England) John Quinn	15–11, 2–15, 2–15	(silver) Runner-up
1994	Lausanne International	(England) Ian Pearson	(England) Steve Bish (Brunei) Imay Hendra	15–11, 15–5	(gold) Winner
1995	Wimbledon International	(England) Ian Pearson	(England) Chris Hunt (England) John Quinn	2–15, 10–15	(silver) Runner-up
1996	Finnish International	(England) Ian Pearson	(Sweden) Henrik Andersson (Sweden) Johan Tholinsson	15–4, 9–15, 15–2	(gold) Winner
1996	Portugal International	(England) Ian Pearson	(England) Steve Isaac (England) Nathan Robertson	15–11, 15–5	(gold) Winner
1996	La Chaux-de-Fonds International	(England) Ian Pearson	(England) Steve Isaac (England) Nathan Robertson	15–12, 13–15, 17–15	(gold) Winner
1996	Welsh International	(England) Ian Pearson	(Sweden) Fredrik Bergström (Sweden) Rasmus Wengberg	18–16, 15–9	(gold) Winner
1997	Czech International	(England) Ian Sullivan	(England) Steve Isaac (England) Neil Waterman	7–9, 9–4, 5–1 retired	(gold) Winner
1997	Welsh International	(England) Ian Sullivan	(Netherlands) Dennis Lens (Netherlands) Quinten van Dalm	15–5, 15–4	(gold) Winner
1997	Irish International	(England) Ian Sullivan	(England) Graham Hurrell (England) Peter Jeffrey	15–2, 10–15, 15–7	(gold) Winner
1998	Portugal International	(England) Ian Pearson	(Portugal) Hugo Rodrigues (Portugal) Fernando Silva	15–8, 15–11	(gold) Winner
1999	Spanish International	(England) Graham Hurrell	(France) Manuel Dubrulle (France) Vincent Laigle	15–3, 15–10	(gold) Winner
1999	Irish International	(England) Graham Hurrel]	(England) Anthony Clark (England) Paul Trueman	15–5, 14–17, 15–4	(gold) Winner
2002	Austrian International	(England) Robert Blair	(England) Peter Jeffrey (England) Ian Palethorpe	7–2, 7–3, 7–5	(gold) Winner

Mixed doubles
Year	Tournament	Partner	Opponent	Score	Result
1993	Czech International	(England) Emma Constable	(England) John Quinn (England) Nichola Beck	14–17, 2–15	(silver) Runner-up
1994	Lausanne International	(England) Emma Constable	(Russia) Pavel Uvarov (Bulgaria) Diana Koleva	15–2, 17–16	(gold) Winner
1994	Welsh International	(England) Emma Constable	(England) Nick Ponting (England) Joanne Goode	15–18, 9–15	(silver) Runner-up
1996	Finnish International	(England) Emma Constable	(Norway) Trond Wåland (Norway) Camilla Wright	15–13, 15–4	(gold) Winner
1996	Portugal International	(England) Emma Constable	(England) Nathan Robertson (England) Gail Emms	15–12, 13–15, 13–18	(silver) Runner-up
1996	La Chaux-de-Fonds International	(England) Emma Constable	(Germany) Björn Siegemund (Germany) Karen Neumann	11–15, 5–15	(silver) Runner-up
1996	Amor International	(England) Emma Constable	(Denmark) Allan Borch (Denmark) Rikke Broen	10–15, 10–15	(silver) Runner-up
1997	Welsh International	(England) Sara Sankey	(England) Ian Sullivan (England) Gail Emms	15–6, 17–14	(gold) Winner
1998	Portugal International	(England) Sara Hardaker	(Canada) Iain Sydie (Canada) Denyse Julien	0–15, 7–15	(silver) Runner-up
