= Jonas Rasmussen =

Danish badminton player (born 1977)

Personal information
- Born: 28 October 1977 (age 49) Aarhus, Denmark
- Height: 1.84 m (6 ft 0 in)
- Weight: 75 kg (165 lb; 11.8 st)

Sport
- Country: Denmark
- Sport: Badminton
- Handedness: Right

Men's & mixed doubles
- Highest ranking: 1
- BWF profile
Medal record
Men's badminton
Representing Denmark
World Championships
Gold medal – first place	2003 Birmingham	Men's doubles
Bronze medal – third place	2003 Birmingham	Mixed doubles
Bronze medal – third place	2006 Madrid	Men's doubles
Sudirman Cup
Silver medal – second place	2011 Qingdao	Mixed team
Bronze medal – third place	2005 Beijing	Mixed team
Bronze medal – third place	2003 Eindhoven	Mixed team
Thomas Cup
Silver medal – second place	2006 Tokyo/Sendai	Men's team
Silver medal – second place	2004 Jakarta	Men's team
Bronze medal – third place	2012 Wuhan	Men's team
Bronze medal – third place	2002 Guangzhou	Men's team
European Championships
Gold medal – first place	2010 Manchester	Men's doubles
Gold medal – first place	2008 Herning	Men's doubles
Silver medal – second place	2004 Geneva	Mixed doubles
Bronze medal – third place	2004 Geneva	Men's doubles
Bronze medal – third place	2002 Malmö	Men's doubles
European Men's Team Championships
Gold medal – first place	2012 Amsterdam	Men's team
Gold medal – first place	2010 Warsaw	Men's team
Gold medal – first place	2006 Thessalonica	Men's team
European Junior Championships
Gold medal – first place	1995 Nitra	Mixed team
Silver medal – second place	1995 Nitra	Boys' doubles
Silver medal – second place	1995 Nitra	Mixed doubles

Jonas Rasmussen (born 28 October 1977 in Aarhus) is a retired badminton player from Denmark.

== Career ==
With his men's doubles partner Lars Paaske he won the 2003 IBF World Championships defeating Indonesian pair Candra Wijaya and Sigit Budiarto in the gold medal match and the All England Super Series 2010 defeating compatriots Mathias Boe and Carsten Mogensen. Rasmussen also competed in badminton at the 2004 Summer Olympics in men's doubles with Paaske. They had a bye in the first round, then were defeated in the round of 16 by Yim Bang-eun and Kim Yong-hyun of Korea.

He also competed in mixed doubles with partner Rikke Olsen. They had a bye in the first round and defeated Daniel Shirley and Sara Petersen of New Zealand in the second. In the quarterfinals, Rasmussen and Olsen beat Kim Dong-moon and Ra Kyung-min of Korea 17–14, 15–8 to advance to the semifinals. There, they lost to Nathan Robertson and Gail Emms of Great Britain 15–6, 15–12. In the bronze medal match, they were defeated by fellow Danish pair Jens Eriksen and Mette Schjoldager 15–5, 15–5 to finish fourth place.

He won the gold medal at the 2008 European Badminton Championships in men's doubles with Lars Paaske. With the retirement of Lars Paaske after the 2010 BWF World Championships in Paris, He is now pairing with another Danish player, Mads Conrad-Petersen.

== Achievements ==
=== World Championships ===
Men's doubles
Year	Venue	Partner	Opponent	Score	Result
2003	National Indoor Arena; Birmingham, England	(Denmark) Lars Paaske	(Indonesia) Sigit Budiarto (Indonesia) Candra Wijaya	15–7, 13–15, 15–13	Gold
2006	Palacio de Deportes de la Comunidad de Madrid; Madrid, Spain	(Denmark) Lars Paaske	(England) Robert Blair (England) Anthony Clark	21–23, 21–17, 17–21	Bronze

Mixed doubles
Year	Venue	Partner	Opponent	Score	Result
2003	National Indoor Arena; Birmingham, England	(Denmark) Rikke Olsen	(China) Zhang Jun (China) Gao Ling	3–15, 17–15	Bronze

=== European Championships ===
Men's doubles
Year	Venue	Partner	Opponent	Score	Result
2002	Baltiska Hallen; Malmö, Sweden	(Denmark) Lars Paaske	(England) Anthony Clark (England) Nathan Robertson	3–7, 7–1, 1–7, 6–8	Bronze
2004	Queue d’Arve Sport Center; Geneva, Switzerland	(Denmark) Lars Paaske	(England) Anthony Clark (England) Nathan Robertson	15–11, 5–15, 11–15	Bronze
2008	Messecenter; Herning, Denmark	(Denmark) Lars Paaske	(Denmark) Jens Eriksen (Denmark) Martin Lundgaard Hansen	21–19, 21–16	Gold
2010	Manchester Evening News Arena; Manchester, England	(Denmark) Lars Paaske	(Denmark) Mathias Boe (Denmark) Carsten Mogensen	24–22, 22–20	Gold

Mixed doubles
Year	Venue	Partner	Opponent	Score	Result
2004	Queue d’Arve Sport Center; Geneva, Switzerland	(Denmark) Rikke Olsen	(England) Nathan Robertson (England) Gail Emms	3–15, 15–8, 5–15	Silver

=== European Junior Championships ===
Boys' doubles
Year	Venue	Partner	Opponent	Score	Result
1995	Športová hala Olympia; Nitra, Slovakia	(Denmark) Søren Hansen	(Denmark) Peter Gade (Denmark) Peder Nissen	6–15, 6–15	Silver

Mixed doubles
Year	Venue	Partner	Opponent	Score	Result
1995	Športová hala Olympia; Nitra, Slovakia	(Denmark) Pernille Harder	(Denmark) Peder Nissen (Denmark) Mette Hansen	5–15, 4–15	Silver

=== BWF Superseries ===
The BWF Superseries, launched on 14 December 2006 and implemented in 2007, is a series of elite badminton tournaments, sanctioned by Badminton World Federation (BWF). BWF Superseries has two level such as Superseries and Superseries Premier. A season of Superseries features twelve tournaments around the world, which introduced since 2011, with successful players invited to the Superseries Finals held at the year end.

Men's doubles
Year	Tournament	Partner	Opponent	Score	Result
2008	Malaysia Open	(Denmark) Lars Paaske	(Indonesia) Markis Kido (Indonesia) Hendra Setiawan	10–21, 22–20, 18–21	(silver) Runner-up
2008	Japan Open	(Denmark) Lars Paaske	(Indonesia) Mohammad Ahsan (Indonesia) Bona Septano	21–17, 15–21, 21–13	(gold) Winner
2009	Hong Kong Open	(Denmark) Lars Paaske	(South Korea) Jung Jae-sung (South Korea) Lee Yong-dae	21–13, 15–21, 8–21	(silver) Runner-up
2010	All England Open	(Denmark) Lars Paaske	(Denmark) Mathias Boe (Denmark) Carsten Mogensen	21–23, 21–19, 26–24	(gold) Winner
2011	Malaysia Open	(Denmark) Mads Conrad-Petersen	(China) Chai Biao (China) Guo Zhendong	16–21, 14–21	(silver) Runner-up

BWF Super Series Finals tournament
BWF Super Series Premier tournament
BWF Super Series tournament

=== IBF/BWF World Grand Prix ===
The BWF Grand Prix had two levels, the Grand Prix and Grand Prix Gold. It was a series of badminton tournaments sanctioned by the Badminton World Federation (BWF) and played between 2007 and 2017.The World Badminton Grand Prix sanctioned by International Badminton Federation (IBF) from 1983 to 2006.

Men's doubles
Year	Tournament	Partner	Opponent	Score	Result
1998	French Open	(Denmark) Peder Nissen	(Denmark) Jan Jørgensen (Denmark) Ove Svejstrup	7–15, 15–18	(silver) Runner-up
1999	U.S. Open	(Denmark) Michael Lamp	(England) James Anderson (England) Graham Hurrell	15–10, 15–13	(gold) Winner
2000	Swedish Open	(Denmark) Michael Lamp	(Thailand) Kitipon Kitikul (Thailand) Khunakorn Sudhisodhi	8–15, 11–15	(silver) Runner-up
2000	German Open	(Denmark) Michael Lamp	(Denmark) Jim Laugesen (Denmark) Michael Søgaard	17–16, 10–15, 7–15	(silver) Runner-up
2001	German Open	(Denmark) Michael Lamp	(Denmark) Jim Laugesen (Denmark) Michael Søgaard	1–7, 1–7, 7–3, 4–7	(silver) Runner-up
2002	German Open	(Denmark) Lars Paaske	(Denmark) Jim Laugesen (Denmark) Michael Søgaard	10–15, 15–9, 15–6	(gold) Winner
2003	Singapore Open	(Denmark) Lars Paaske	(Denmark) Jens Eriksen (Denmark) Martin Lundgaard Hansen	9–15, 10–15	(silver) Runner-up
2003	China Open	(Denmark) Lars Paaske	(Malaysia) Choong Tan Fook (Malaysia) Lee Wan Wah	15–12, 15–10	(gold) Winner
2004	Denmark Open	(Denmark) Lars Paaske	(Indonesia) Markis Kido (Indonesia) Hendra Setiawan	15–6, 15–13	(gold) Winner
2005	All England Open	(Denmark) Lars Paaske	(China) Fu Haifeng (China) Cai Yun	10–15, 6–15	(silver) Runner-up
2005	Thailand Open	(Denmark) Lars Paaske	(South Korea) Jung Jae-sung (South Korea) Lee Jae-jin	11–15, 5–15	(silver) Runner-up
2005	Denmark Open	(Denmark) Lars Paaske	(Malaysia) Chan Chong Ming (Malaysia) Koo Kien Keat	6–15, 7–15	(silver) Runner-up
2006	Denmark Open	(Denmark) Lars Paaske	(Denmark) Mathias Boe (Denmark) Joachim Fischer Nielsen	18–21, 21–10, 21–17	(gold) Winner
2007	Chinese Taipei Open	(Denmark) Lars Paaske	(Indonesia) Markis Kido (Indonesia) Hendra Setiawan	17–21, 12–21	(silver) Runner-up

Mixed doubles
Year	Tournament	Partner	Opponent	Score	Result
1997	Dutch Open	(Denmark) Ann-Lou Jorgensen	(Denmark) Lars Paaske (Denmark) Jane F. Bramsen	15–12, 15–6	(gold) Winner
1999	U.S. Open	(Denmark) Jane F. Bramsen	(Denmark) Michael Lamp (Denmark) Pernille Harder	15–3, 15–10	(gold) Winner
2000	Swedish Open	(Denmark) Jane F. Bramsen	(Sweden) Fredrik Bergström (Sweden) Jenny Karlsson	15–6, 17–14	(gold) Winner
2000	U.S. Open	(Denmark) Jane F. Bramsen	(England) Ian Sullivan (England) Gail Emms	8–15, 15–11, 15–12	(gold) Winner
2000	German Open	(Denmark) Jane F. Bramsen	(England) Ian Sullivan (England) Gail Emms	15–3, 7–15, 15–4	(gold) Winner
2002	Swiss Open	(Denmark) Jane F. Bramsen	(South Korea) Kim Dong-moon (South Korea) Ra Kyung-min	3–7, 5–7, 1–7	(silver) Runner-up
2002	German Open	(Denmark) Rikke Olsen	(Indonesia) Anggun Nugroho (Indonesia) Eny Widiowati	11–0, 11–6	(gold) Winner
2006	Malaysia Open	(Denmark) Britta Andersen	(China) Zhang Jun (China) Gao Ling	21–19, 14–21, 15–21	(silver) Runner-up

BWF Grand Prix Gold tournament
BWF Grand Prix tournament

=== IBF International ===
Men's singles
Year	Tournament	Opponent	Score	Result
1998	South Africa International	(France) Jean-Frederic Massias	15–10, 15–13	(gold) Winner

Men's doubles
Year	Tournament	Partner	Opponent	Score	Result
1995	Hungarian International	(Denmark) Jan Jorgensen	(Austria) Harald Koch (Austria) Jurgen Koch	18–15, 15–12	(gold) Winner
1996	Irish Open	(Denmark) Ove Svejstrup	(Chinese Taipei) Lee Sung-yuan (Chinese Taipei) Yong Shyu-Jeng	10–15, 5–15	(silver) Runner-up
1997	Amor International	(Denmark) Peder Nissen	(Netherlands) Dennis Lens (Netherlands) Quinten van Dalm	10–11, 9–6, 11–8, 5–11, 9–4	(gold) Winner
1998	South Africa International	(Denmark) Kenneth Jonassen	(South Africa) Johan Kleingeld (South Africa) Anton Kriel	15–3, 15–8	(gold) Winner
1999	Scottish International	(Denmark) Michael Lamp	(Scotland) Russell Hogg (Scotland) Kenny Middlemiss	15–8, 15–11	(gold) Winner
2006	Finnish Open	(Denmark) Peter Steffensen	(Sweden) Joakim Andersson (China) Zhang Yi	21–9, 21–10	(gold) Winner

Mixed doubles
Year	Tournament	Partner	Opponent	Score	Result
1996	Hamburg Cup	(Denmark) Ann-Lou Jorgensen	(Netherlands) Dennis Lens (Netherlands) Erica Van Den Heuvel	8–15, 17–14, 15–11	(gold) Winner
1996	Czech International	(Denmark) Ann-Lou Jorgensen	(France) Manuel Dubrulle (France) Sandrine Lefevre	15–2, 15–11	(gold) Winner
1996	Hungarian International	(Denmark) Ann-Lou Jorgensen	(England) Ian Sullivan (England) Joanne Nicholas	15–5, 15–11	(gold) Winner
1996	Norwegian International	(Denmark) Ann-Lou Jorgensen	(England) Julian Robertson (England) Gail Emms	6–9, 9–2, 5–9, 5–9	(silver) Runner-up
1996	Irish Open	(Denmark) Ann-Lou Jorgensen	(Denmark) Jesper Larsen (Denmark) Majken Vange	10–15, 15–8, 9–15	(silver) Runner-up
1997	Amor International	(Denmark) Ann-Lou Jorgensen	(Netherlands) Quinten van Dalm (Netherlands) Nicole van Hooren	9–11, 3–9, 9–7, 9–7, 7–9	(silver) Runner-up
1998	South Africa International	(South Africa) Meagan Burnett	(Denmark) Kenneth Jonassen (South Africa) Beverley Meerholz	15–5, 15–7	(gold) Winner
2006	Finnish Open	(Denmark) Britta Andersen	(Denmark) Rasmus Bonde (Denmark) Christinna Pedersen	21–11, 21–15	(gold) Winner

=== Invitation tournament ===
Men's doubles
Year	Tournament	Partner	Opponent	Score	Result
2003	Copenhagen Masters	(Denmark) Lars Paaske	(Indonesia) Halim Haryanto (Indonesia) Candra Wijaya	11–15, 4–15	(silver) Runner-up
2008	Copenhagen Masters	(Denmark) Lars Paaske	(Denmark) Mathias Boe (Denmark) Carsten Mogensen	14–21, 21–13, 21–19	(gold) Winner
2009	Copenhagen Masters	(Denmark) Lars Paaske	(Denmark) Mathias Boe (Denmark) Carsten Mogensen	21–16, 22–20	(gold) Winner
2010	Copenhagen Masters	(Denmark) Mads Conrad-Petersen	(Denmark) Mathias Boe (Denmark) Carsten Mogensen	21–16, 14–21, 25–23	(gold) Winner
