= Quinten van Dalm =

Dutch-Danish badminton player

Personal information
- Born: Quinten Xerxes van Dalm; 26 June 1972 (age 54) Eindhoven, North Brabant, Netherlands
- Height: 1.80 m (5 ft 11 in)
- Weight: 72 kg (159 lb)

Sport
- Country: Denmark
- Sport: Badminton
- Handedness: Right
- Event: Men's & mixed doubles

Men's & mixed doubles
- BWF profile
Medal record
Men's badminton
Representing Netherlands
European Championships
| Bronze medal – third place | 2000 Glasgow | Mixed team |

Quinten Xerxes van Dalm (born 26 June 1972) is a former Dutch badminton player, and later represented Denmark. He competed at the 2000 Summer Olympics in the men's doubles event partnered with Dennis Lens. He was part of the Netherlands national team that won the mixed team bronze at the 2000 European Championships in Glasgow. He had collected 11 times national title, 8 in the men's doubles event and 3 times in the mixed doubles event. His brother, Edwin, also a Dutch badminton player. He married a former Danish badminton player, Mette Sørensen, and now lived in Brønderslev, Denmark.

== Achievements ==
=== IBF International ===
Men's doubles

| Year | Tournament | Partner | Opponent | Score | Result |
|---|---|---|---|---|---|
| 1993 | La Chaux-de-Fonds International | (Netherlands) Pierre Pelupessy | (Mauritius) Michael Adams (England) Chris Hunt | 8–15, 14–17 | (silver) Runner-up |
| 1993 | Austrian International | (Netherlands) Edwin van Dalm | (England) Simon Archer (England) Nick Ponting | 5–15, 5–15 | (silver) Runner-up |
| 1997 | Amor International | (Netherlands) Dennis Lens | (Denmark) Peder Nissen (Denmark) Jonas Rasmussen | 11–10, 6–9, 8–11, 9–5, 4–9 | (silver) Runner-up |
| 1997 | Austrian International | (Netherlands) Dennis Lens | (England) Anthony Clark (England) Ian Pearson | 17–16, 11–15, 7–15 | (silver) Runner-up |
| 1997 | Hungarian International | (Netherlands) Dennis Lens | (Bulgaria) Mihail Popov (Bulgaria) Svetoslav Stoyanov | 6–9, 5–9, 4–9 | (silver) Runner-up |
| 1997 | Welsh International | (Netherlands) Dennis Lens | (England) James Anderson (England) Ian Sullivan | 5–15, 4–15 | (silver) Runner-up |
| 1999 | BMW International | (Netherlands) Dennis Lens | (Ukraine) Vladislav Druzchenko (Ukraine) Valeriy Streltsov | 15–9, 11–15, 15–13 | (gold) Winner |

Mixed doubles

| Year | Tournament | Partner | Opponent | Score | Result |
|---|---|---|---|---|---|
| 1993 | Amor International | (Netherlands) Nicole van Hooren | (Indonesia) Paulus Firman (Indonesia) S. Herawati | 15–3, 15–8 | (gold) Winner |
| 1996 | Austrian International | (Netherlands) Nicole van Hooren | (Ukraine) Vladislav Druzchenko (Ukraine) Viktoria Evtuschenko | 4–15, 8–15 | (silver) Runner-up |
| 1996 | Welsh International | (Netherlands) Nicole van Hooren | (England) Ian Pearson (England) Joanne Wright | 18–14, 15–2 | (gold) Winner |
| 1997 | Amor International | (Netherlands) Nicole van Hooren | (Denmark) Jonas Rasmussen (Denmark) Ann-Lou Jørgensen | 11–9, 9–3, 7–9, 7–9, 9–7 | (gold) Winner |
| 1997 | Austrian International | (Netherlands) Nicole van Hooren | (Germany) Michael Keck (Germany) Karen Stechmann | 8–15, 4–15 | (silver) Runner-up |
