= Anthony Clark (badminton) =

English badminton player (born 1977)

Personal information
- Born: Anthony Ian Clark; 1 November 1977 (age 49) Derby, England
- Height: 1.73 m (5 ft 8 in)

Sport
- Country: England
- Sport: Badminton
- Handedness: Left
- Coached by: Peter Jeffrey; Julian Robertson; Andy Wood

Men's & mixed doubles
- Highest ranking: 4 (in MD); 5 (in XD)
- BWF profile
Medal record
Men's badminton
Representing England
World Championships
Silver medal – second place	2006 Madrid	Men's doubles
Silver medal – second place	2006 Madrid	Mixed doubles
Sudirman Cup
Bronze medal – third place	2007 Glasgow	Mixed team
Commonwealth Games
Gold medal – first place	2002 Manchester	Mixed team
Silver medal – second place	2006 Melbourne	Mixed team
Silver medal – second place	2010 Delhi	Men's doubles
Bronze medal – third place	2002 Manchester	Men's doubles
Bronze medal – third place	2002 Manchester	Mixed doubles
Bronze medal – third place	2006 Melbourne	Men's doubles
Bronze medal – third place	2010 Delhi	Mixed team
European Championships
Gold medal – first place	2008 Herning	Mixed doubles
Silver medal – second place	2002 Malmö	Men's doubles
Silver medal – second place	2004 Geneva	Men's doubles
Bronze medal – third place	2006 Den Bosch	Men's doubles
Bronze medal – third place	2006 Den Bosch	Mixed doubles
European Mixed Team Championships
Silver medal – second place	2002 Malmö	Mixed team
Silver medal – second place	2008 Herning	Mixed team
Silver medal – second place	2009 Liverpool	Mixed team
Bronze medal – third place	2006 Den Bosch	Mixed team
Bronze medal – third place	2011 Amsterdam	Mixed team
European Men's Team Championships
Silver medal – second place	2008 Almere	Men's team
Bronze medal – third place	2006 Thessalonica	Men's team

Anthony Ian Clark (born 1 November 1977) is an English former badminton player who represented England on 106 occasions. He became only the 2nd male player ever to reach 2 finals at the same World Championships. Reaching the final of both mixed and men's doubles at the 2006 World Championships in Madrid. Clark also won the mixed doubles title at the 2008 European Championships, Captained the England team to a bronze medal at the 2007 Surdiman Cup, and was part of the England winning team at the 2002 Commonwealth Games.

== Career ==
=== 2004 Summer Olympics ===
Clark competed in badminton at the 2004 Summer Olympics in men's doubles with partner Nathan Robertson. They defeated Patapol Ngernsrisuk and Sudket Prapakamol of Thailand in the first round, then were defeated in the round of 16 by Eng Hian and Flandy Limpele of Indonesia.

=== 2006 World Champs ===
Clark reached the mixed doubles final at the 2006 IBF World Championships together with Donna Kellogg, losing the final against Gail Emms and Nathan Robertson. He also lost the men's doubles final in the same event together with Robert Blair.

=== 2008 Olympics ===
Clark represented Great Britain at the 2008 Summer Olympics in the mixed doubles badminton event.

== Achievements ==
=== World Championships ===
Men's doubles
Year	Venue	Partner	Opponent	Score	Result
2006	Palacio de Deportes de la Comunidad, Madrid, Spain	(England) Robert Blair	(China) Cai Yun (China) Fu Haifeng	9–21, 13–21	Silver

Mixed doubles
Year	Venue	Partner	Opponent	Score	Result
2006	Palacio de Deportes de la Comunidad, Madrid, Spain	(England) Donna Kellogg	(England) Nathan Robertson (England) Gail Emms	15–21, 12–21	Silver

=== Commonwealth Games ===
Men's doubles
Year	Venue	Partner	Opponent	Score	Result
2002	Bolton Arena, Manchester, England	(England) Nathan Robertson	(Malaysia) Chang Kim Wai (Malaysia) Choong Tan Fook	5–8, 3–7, 4–7	Bronze
2006	Melbourne Convention and Exhibition Centre, Melbourne, Australia	(England) Robert Blair	(Australia) Ashley Brehaut (Australia) Travis Denney	21–6, 21–14	Bronze
2010	Siri Fort Sports Complex, New Delhi, India	(England) Nathan Robertson	(Malaysia) Koo Kien Keat (Malaysia) Tan Boon Heong	19–21, 14–21	Silver

Mixed doubles
Year	Venue	Partner	Opponent	Score	Result
2002	Bolton Arena, Manchester, England	(England) Sara Sankey	(Malaysia) Chew Choon Eng (Malaysia) Chin Eei Hui	7–4, 7–3, 4–7, 4–7, 0–7	Bronze

=== European Championships ===
Men's doubles
Year	Venue	Partner	Opponent	Score	Result
2002	Baltiska Hallen, Malmö, Sweden	(England) Nathan Robertson	(Denmark) Jens Eriksen (Denmark) Martin Lundgaard Hansen	4–7, 7–1, 3–7, 7–2, 3–7	Silver
2004	Queue d’Arve Sport Center, Geneva, Switzerland	(England) Nathan Robertson	(Denmark) Jens Eriksen (Denmark) Martin Lundgaard Hansen	3–15, 9–15	Silver
2006	Maaspoort, Den Bosch, Netherlands	(England) Robert Blair	(Denmark) Mathias Boe (Denmark) Carsten Mogensen	17–21, 21–11, 18–21	Bronze

Mixed doubles
Year	Venue	Partner	Opponent	Score	Result
2006	Maaspoort, Den Bosch, Netherlands	(England) Donna Kellogg	(Denmark) Jens Eriksen (Denmark) Mette Schjoldager	16–21, 14–21	Bronze
2008	Messecenter, Herning, Denmark	(England) Donna Kellogg	(Poland) Robert Mateusiak (Poland) Nadieżda Kostiuczyk	16–21, 22–20, 21–15	Gold

=== BWF Superseries ===
The BWF Superseries, which was launched on 14 December 2006 and implemented in 2007, is a series of elite badminton tournaments, sanctioned by the Badminton World Federation (BWF). BWF Superseries levels are Superseries and Superseries Premier. A season of Superseries consists of twelve tournaments around the world that have been introduced since 2011. Successful players are invited to the Superseries Finals, which are held at the end of each year.

Men's doubles
Year	Tournament	Partner	Opponent	Score	Result
2009	Singapore Open	(England) Nathan Robertson	(Indonesia) Markis Kido (Indonesia) Hendra Setiawan	21–12, 21–11	(gold) Winner

Mixed doubles
Year	Tournament	Partner	Opponent	Score	Result
2007	All England Open	(England) Donna Kellogg	(China) Zheng Bo (China) Gao Ling	21–16, 18–21, 14–21	(silver) Runner-up
2007	China Masters	(England) Donna Kellogg	(China) Zheng Bo (China) Gao Ling	16–21, 17–21	(silver) Runner-up
2008	Swiss Open	(England) Donna Kellogg	(China) He Hanbin (China) Yu Yang	15–21, 9–21	(silver) Runner-up
2008	Singapore Open	(England) Donna Kellogg	(Indonesia) Nova Widianto (Indonesia) Liliyana Natsir	21–17, 14–21, 9–21	(silver) Runner-up
2008	French Open	(England) Donna Kellogg	(China) He Hanbin (China) Yu Yang	13–21, 19–21	(silver) Runner-up
2009	Denmark Open	(England) Donna Kellogg	(Denmark) Joachim Fischer Nielsen (Denmark) Christinna Pedersen	16–21, 27–25, 17–21	(silver) Runner-up

BWF Super Series Finals tournament
BWF Super Series Premier tournament
BWF Super Series tournament

=== IBF World Grand Prix ===
The World Badminton Grand Prix has been sanctioned by the International Badminton Federation from 1983 to 2006.

Men's doubles
Year	Tournament	Partner	Opponent	Score	Result
2000	U.S. Open	(England) Ian Sullivan	(England) James Anderson (England) Graham Hurrell	14–17, 11–15	(silver) Runner-up
2004	Thailand Open	(England) Nathan Robertson	(Indonesia) Luluk Hadiyanto (Indonesia) Alvent Yulianto	12–15, 6–15	(silver) Runner-up
2005	Thessaloniki Grand Prix	(England) Robert Blair	(Germany) Michael Fuchs (Germany) Roman Spitko	15–6, 15–9	(gold) Winner
2006	German Open	(England) Robert Blair	(South Korea) Jung Jae-sung (South Korea) Lee Yong-dae	11–15, 6–15	(silver) Runner-up

Mixed doubles
Year	Tournament	Partner	Opponent	Score	Result
2005	Thessaloniki Grand Prix	(England) Donna Kellogg	(England) Robert Blair (England) Natalie Munt	15–4, 6–15, 15–13	(gold) Winner
2006	Denmark Open	(England) Donna Kellogg	(Denmark) Thomas Laybourn (Denmark) Kamilla Rytter Juhl	14–21, 21–14, 22–20	(gold) Winner

=== BWF International Challenge/Series ===
Men's doubles
Year	Tournament	Partner	Opponent	Score	Result
1997	La Chaux-de-Fonds International	(England) Ian Sullivan	(Germany) Michael Helber (Germany) Björn Siegemund	12–15, 17–18	(silver) Runner-up
1997	Austrian International	(England) Ian Pearson	(Netherlands) Dennis Lens (Netherlands) Quinten van Dalm	16–17, 15–11, 15–7	(gold) Winner
1998	Slovak International	(England) Ian Sullivan	(England) Graham Hurrell (England) Peter Jeffrey	15–8, 12–15, 7–15	(silver) Runner-up
1998	Scottish International	(England) Ian Sullivan	(Denmark) Michael Lamp (Denmark) Martin Lundgaard Hansen	10–15, 5–15	(silver) Runner-up
1999	French Open	(England) Ian Sullivan	(Poland) Michał Łogosz (Poland) Robert Mateusiak	15–11, 15–10	(gold) Winner
1999	Italian International	(England) Ian Sullivan	(Japan) Takaaki Hayashi (Japan) Katsuya Nishiyama	15–6, 15–9	(gold) Winner
1999	Irish International	(England) Paul Trueman	(England) James Anderson (England) Graham Hurrell	5–15, 17–14, 4–15	(silver) Runner-up
2000	Welsh International	(England) Ian Sullivan	(Denmark) Kristian Langbak (Denmark) Jesper Thomsen	8–6, 1–7, 7–0	(gold) Winner
2002	BMW Open International	(England) Nathan Robertson	(England) Simon Archer (England) Flandy Limpele	5–15, 14–17	(silver) Runner-up
2004	Bitburger Open	(England) Simon Archer	(France) Jean-Michel Lefort (France) Svetoslav Stoyanov	15–5, 15–7	(gold) Winner
2005	Portugal International	(England) Simon Archer	(Japan) Keishi Kawaguchi (Japan) Toru Matsumoto	17–15, 15–4	(gold) Winner
2005	Swedish International	(England) Simon Archer	(Sweden) Henrik Andersson (Sweden) Fredrik Bergström	Walkover	(gold) Winner
2010	Irish International	(England) Chris Langridge	(England) Chris Adcock (England) Andrew Ellis	13–21, 16–21	(silver) Runner-up
2010	Italian International	(England) Chris Langridge	(Russia) Vladimir Ivanov (Russia) Ivan Sozonov	21–14, 21–19	(gold) Winner
2011	Austrian International	(England) Chris Langridge	(Japan) Hiroyuki Saeki (Japan) Ryota Taohata	21–15, 21–16	(gold) Winner

Mixed doubles
Year	Tournament	Partner	Opponent	Score	Result
1998	Czech International	(England) Lorraine Cole	(England) Ian Sullivan (England) Gail Emms	15–4, 15–13	(gold) Winner
1998	Slovak International	(England) Lorraine Cole	(England) David Lindley (England) Joanne Wright	15–5, 15–3	(gold) Winner
1999	Italian International	(China) Zeng Yaqiong	(England) Ian Sullivan (China) Han Jingna	11–15, 7–15	(silver) Runner-up
1999	Irish International	(England) Lorraine Cole	(Belgium) Ruud Kuijten (Belgium) Manon Albinus	15–7, 15–8	(gold) Winner
2000	Welsh International	(England) Gail Emms	(Sweden) Henrik Andersson (Sweden) Johanna Persson	7–4, 7–1, 7–0	(gold) Winner
2005	Portugal International	(England) Donna Kellogg	(Spain) Sergio Llopis (Spain) Dolores Marco	15–5, 15–10	(gold) Winner

BWF International Challenge tournament
BWF International Series tournament
