= Peder Nissen =

Danish badminton player (born 1976)

Personal information
- Born: 22 December 1976 (age 49) Ikast, Denmark

Sport
- Country: Denmark
- Sport: Badminton
- Event: Men's & mixed doubles

Men's & mixed doubles
- BWF profile
Medal record
Men's badminton
Representing Denmark
World Junior Championships
Gold medal – first place	1994 Kuala Lumpur	Boys' doubles
European Junior Championships
Gold medal – first place	1995 Nitra	Boys' doubles
Gold medal – first place	1995 Nitra	Mixed doubles
Gold medal – first place	1995 Nitra	Mixed team

Peder Nissen (born 22 December 1976) is a former Danish badminton player. Born and raised in Ikast, Nissen began his career in Ikast at the age of six. He is a two-time Danish national champion and has spent 13 years working as a coach in his hometown. In 2013, he became the chairman of Ikast FS.

== Achievements ==
=== World Junior Championships ===
Boys' doubles
Year	Venue	Partner	Opponent	Score	Result
1994	Kuala Lumpur Badminton Stadium; Kuala Lumpur, Malaysia	(Denmark) Peter Gade	(Indonesia) Eng Hian (Indonesia) Andreas	15–10, 15–11	Gold

=== European Junior Championships ===
Boys' doubles
Year	Venue	Partner	Opponent	Score	Result
1995	Športová hala Olympia; Nitra, Slovakia	(Denmark) Peter Gade	(Denmark) Jonas Rasmussen (Denmark) Søren Hansen	15–6, 15–6	Gold

Mixed doubles
Year	Venue	Partner	Opponent	Score	Result
1995	Športová hala Olympia; Nitra, Slovakia	(Denmark) Mette Hansen	(Denmark) Jonas Rasmussen (Denmark) Pernille Harder	15–5, 15–4	Gold

=== IBF International ===
Men's doubles
Year	Tournament	Partner	Opponent	Score	Result
1998	French Open	(Denmark) Jonas Rasmussen	(Denmark) Jan Jørgensen (Denmark) Ove Svejstrup	7–15, 15–18	(silver) Runner-up
1997	Amor International	(Denmark) Jonas Rasmussen	(Netherlands) Dennis Lens (Netherlands) Quinten van Dalm	10–11, 9–6, 11–8, 5–11, 9–4	(gold) Winner
1996	Malmö International	(Denmark) Jesper Larsen	(Sweden) Anders Hansson (Sweden) Robert Larsson	9–15, 7–15	(silver) Runner-up
1996	French Open	(Denmark) Jesper Larsen	(Germany) Michael Keck (Indonesia) Dharma Gunawi	10–15, 8–15	(silver) Runner-up
1996	Austrian International	(Denmark) Jesper Larsen	(Russia) Artur Khachaturjan (Russia) Sergei Melnikov	15–12, 15–9	(gold) Winner
1995	Irish International	(Denmark) Jan Jørgensen	(Denmark) Jim Laugesen (Denmark) Thomas Stavngaard	11–15, 0–15	(silver) Runner-up
1995	Portugal International	(Denmark) Jan Jørgensen	(Denmark) Martin Lundgaard Hansen (Denmark) Henrik Sorensen	7–15, 4–15	(silver) Runner-up
1994	Irish International	(Denmark) Jan Jørgensen	(England) Anthony Bush (England) Steffan Pandya	15–4, 15–3	(gold) Winner

Mixed doubles
Year	Tournament	Partner	Opponent	Score	Result
1995	Portugal International	(Denmark) Mette Hansen	(Denmark) Jan Jørgensen (Denmark) Majken Vange	15–5, 7–15, 15–8	(gold) Winner
