= List of Royal Air Force first-class cricketers =

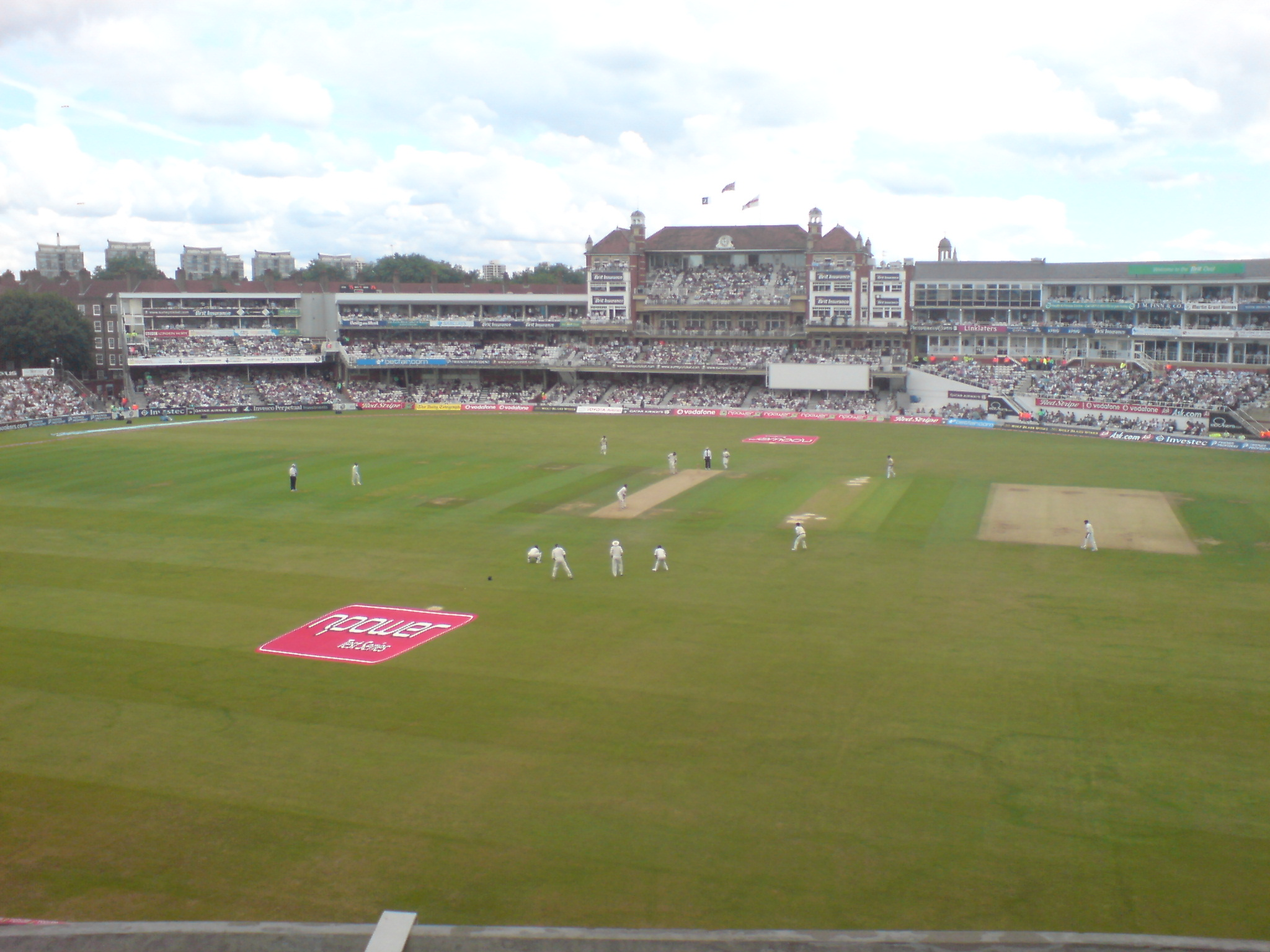
The Royal Air Force played seven of their eleven first-class matches at The Oval (pictured).

From their first match in 1922 to their final match in 1946, 63 players represented the Royal Air Force cricket team in first-class cricket. A first-class match is a domestic cricket match between two representative teams, each having first-class status, as determined by the governing body for cricket in the country where the match is being played. First-class matches consist of matches of three or more days' duration, between two teams of eleven players, played on turf pitches.

The Royal Air Force was formed during World War I in 1918, with the Royal Air Force cricket team being formed in 1919 and playing its first against the British Army cricket team at Lord's in the same year.

This list includes all players who have played at least one first-class match and is initially arranged in the order of debut appearance. Where more than one player won their first cap in the same match, those players are initially listed by batting order at the time of debut.

== Key ==
General

- ‡ – Captain
- † – Wicket-keeper
- First – Year of debut for RAF
- Last – Year of latest match played for RAF
- Mat – Number of matches played for RAF

Batting

- Inn – Number of innings batted
- NO – Number of innings not out
- Runs – Runs scored in career
- HS – Highest score
- 100 – Centuries scored
- 50 – Half-centuries scored
- Avg – Runs scored per dismissal
- * – Batsman remained not out

Bowling

- Balls – Balls bowled in career
- Wkt – Wickets taken in career
- BBI – Best bowling in an innings
- BBM – Best bowling in a match
- Ave – Average runs per wicket

Fielding

- Ca – Catches taken
- St – Stumpings effected

== List of players ==
| No. | Name | Nationality | First | Last | Mat | Inn | Runs | HS | Avg | Balls | Wkt | BBI | Ave | Ca | St |
| No. | Name | Nationality | First | Last | Mat | Inn | Batting | | | Bowling | | | | Fielding | |
|---|---|---|---|---|---|---|---|---|---|---|---|---|---|---|---|
| 1 | Jack Hobbs | England | 1922 | 1922 | 1 | 1 | 27 | 27 | 27.00 | 0 | 0 | – | – | 1 | 0 |
| 2 | Wally Hardinge | England | 1922 | 1922 | 1 | 2 | 107 | 97 | 107.00 | 0 | 0 | – | – | 0 | 0 |
| 3 | Alfred Jeacocke | England | 1922 | 1922 | 1 | 2 | 14 | 7 | 7.00 | 0 | 0 | – | – | 1 | 0 |
| 4 | Frank Woolley | England | 1922 | 1922 | 1 | 2 | 16 | 10 | 8.00 | 150 | 10 | 5/31 | 6.60 | 1 | 0 |
| 5 | Percy Fender ♠ | England | 1922 | 1922 | 1 | 2 | 15 | 13 | 15.00 | 66 | 1 | 1/19 | 22.00 | 3 | 0 |
| 6 | Harold Gilligan | England | 1922 | 1922 | 1 | 1 | 11 | 11 | 11.00 | 18 | 0 | – | – | 2 | 0 |
| 7 | Francis Musson | England | 1922 | 1922 | 1 | 1 | 0 | 0 | 0.00 | 0 | 0 | – | – | 0 | 0 |
| 8 | George Geary | England | 1922 | 1922 | 1 | 1 | 10 | 10 | 10.00 | 204 | 6 | 3/20 | 9.16 | 0 | 0 |
| 9 | Charlie Parker | England | 1922 | 1922 | 1 | 1 | 0 | 0 | 0.00 | 87 | 3 | 2/8 | 9.00 | 0 | 0 |
| 10 | Abe Waddington | England | 1922 | 1922 | 1 | 1 | 4 | 4 | 4.00 | 60 | 0 | – | – | 0 | 0 |
| 11 | Stanley Amor † | England | 1922 | 1922 | 1 | 1 | 1 | 1* | – | 0 | 0 | – | – | 1 | 3 |
| 12 | Edward Northway | England | 1927 | 1928 | 3 | 6 | 132 | 83 | 26.40 | 0 | 0 | – | – | 1 | 0 |
| 13 | Morton Shapcott | England | 1927 | 1932 | 4 | 8 | 246 | 68 | 35.14 | 0 | 0 | – | – | 2 | 0 |
| 14 | Charles Blount ♠ | England | 1927 | 1930 | 6 | 10 | 383 | 110 | 38.30 | 530 | 12 | 3/16 | 24.58 | 9 | 0 |
| 15 | Gerald Livock † | England | 1927 | 1932 | 2 | 4 | 98 | 43 | 32.66 | 0 | 0 | – | – | 3 | 1 |
| 16 | Reginald Fulljames | England | 1927 | 1932 | 8 | 14 | 173 | 47 | 14.41 | 1,659 | 38 | 7/25 | 20.92 | 7 | 0 |
| 17 | Ernest Fawcus | England | 1927 | 1929 | 5 | 8 | 291 | 115 | 41.57 | 453 | 8 | 4/51 | 25.75 | 4 | 0 |
| 18 | Cecil Wigglesworth | England | 1927 | 1927 | 1 | 1 | 19 | 19 | 19.00 | 24 | 0 | – | – | 0 | 0 |
| 19 | Brian Baker ♠ | England | 1927 | 1932 | 8 | 13 | 303 | 66 | 25.25 | 0 | 0 | – | – | 5 | 0 |
| 20 | Leslie Bray | England | 1927 | 1927 | 1 | 1 | 1 | 1* | – | 0 | 0 | – | – | 1 | 0 |
| 21 | Peter Utley | England | 1927 | 1928 | 3 | 3 | 39 | 30 | 13.00 | 702 | 11 | 3/18 | 21.18 | 3 | 0 |
| 22 | Cyril Cooke | England | 1927 | 1930 | 6 | 8 | 51 | 20 | 8.50 | 1,033 | 23 | 7/76 | 21.30 | 4 | 0 |
| 23 | Walter Beisiegel ♠ | England | 1928 | 1931 | 5 | 8 | 172 | 54 | 24.57 | 0 | 0 | – | – | 4 | 0 |
| 24 | Victor Croome † | England | 1928 | 1930 | 5 | 8 | 124 | 36 | 17.71 | 0 | 0 | – | – | 6 | 4 |
| 25 | Leonard Slatter | England | 1928 | 1928 | 1 | 1 | 1 | 1* | – | 72 | 0 | – | – | 0 | 0 |
| 26 | Cyril Adams | England | 1928 | 1932 | 5 | 10 | 173 | 46* | 19.22 | 646 | 11 | 3/62 | 33.90 | 4 | 0 |
| 27 | Edmund Hudleston | England | 1929 | 1931 | 4 | 7 | 97 | 38 | 13.85 | 0 | 0 | – | – | 1 | 0 |
| 28 | Charles Steele | England | 1929 | 1929 | 2 | 3 | 147 | 63 | 49.00 | 0 | 0 | – | – | 0 | 0 |
| 29 | Douglas Macfadyen | England | 1929 | 1931 | 2 | 4 | 11 | 9 | 2.75 | 164 | 2 | 2/59 | 31.50 | 0 | 0 |
| 30 | Leonard Jennings | England | 1929 | 1930 | 2 | 3 | 55 | 45* | 27.50 | 30 | 0 | – | – | 1 | 0 |
| 31 | Ronald Sugden | England | 1929 | 1930 | 2 | 3 | 17 | 12 | 5.66 | 90 | 0 | – | – | 0 | 0 |
| 32 | Jack Holmes ♠ | England | 1930 | 1932 | 3 | 6 | 166 | 59 | 27.66 | 336 | 84 | – | – | 2 | 0 |
| 33 | Nigel Jerram | England | 1930 | 1930 | 1 | 1 | 78 | 43* | 78.00 | 0 | 0 | – | – | 1 | 0 |
| 34 | Tom Pollitt | England | 1931 | 1931 | 1 | 2 | 20 | 14 | 10.00 | 0 | 0 | – | – | 2 | 0 |
| 35 | Geoffrey Longfield | England | 1931 | 1932 | 2 | 4 | 36 | 26 | 9.00 | 210 | 2 | 2/51 | 69.00 | 0 | 0 |
| 36 | Douglas Bader | England | 1931 | 1931 | 1 | 2 | 66 | 65 | 33.00 | 0 | 0 | – | – | 0 | 0 |
| 37 | Francis Hodder | Ireland | 1931 | 1931 | 1 | 1 | 11 | 10* | – | 168 | 1 | 1/69 | 69.00 | 1 | 0 |
| 38 | Holford White | England | 1932 | 1932 | 1 | 2 | 50 | 25 | 25.00 | 0 | 0 | – | – | 0 | 0 |
| 39 | Colin Boumphrey | England | 1932 | 1932 | 1 | 2 | 31 | 31 | 15.50 | 0 | 0 | – | – | 0 | 0 |
| 40 | Roy Scoggins | England | 1932 | 1932 | 1 | 2 | 1 | 1 | 0.50 | 172 | 5 | 5/112 | 22.40 | 0 | 0 |
| 41 | Geoffrey Udal | England | 1932 | 1932 | 1 | 2 | 0 | 0* | – | 138 | 2 | 2/105 | 52.50 | 1 | 0 |
| 42 | Cyril Washbrook | England | 1945 | 1945 | 1 | 2 | 76 | 44 | 38.00 | 0 | 0 | – | – | 0 | 0 |
| 43 | Stan Squires | England | 1945 | 1945 | 1 | 2 | 7 | 6 | 3.50 | 24 | 0 | – | – | 0 | 0 |
| 44 | Bill Edrich | England | 1945 | 1945 | 1 | 2 | 95 | 50* | 95.00 | 96 | 2 | 1/31 | 32.00 | 0 | 0 |
| 45 | Bob Wyatt ♠ | England | 1945 | 1945 | 1 | 2 | 57 | 51 | 57.00 | 0 | 0 | – | – | 1 | 0 |
| 46 | George Cox | England | 1945 | 1945 | 1 | 2 | 36 | 31 | 18.00 | 0 | 0 | – | – | 0 | 0 |
| 47 | Dennis Brookes | England | 1945 | 1945 | 1 | 1 | 20 | 20 | 20.00 | 0 | 0 | – | – | 0 | 2 |
| 48 | Albert Nutter | England | 1945 | 1945 | 1 | 1 | 0 | 0 | 0.00 | 138 | 2 | 2/60 | 40.00 | 0 | 0 |
| 49 | Syd Buller † | England | 1945 | 1945 | 1 | 1 | 9 | 9* | – | 258 | 0 | – | – | 0 | 0 |
| 50 | Reg Partridge | England | 1945 | 1945 | 1 | 1 | 0 | 0* | – | 108 | 3 | 3/41 | 24.33 | 0 | 0 |
| 51 | Austin Matthews | Wales | 1945 | 1945 | 1 | 0 | – | – | – | 198 | 5 | 3/18 | 15.66 | 0 | 0 |
| 52 | Neville Shelmerdine | England | 1945 | 1945 | 1 | 0 | – | – | – | 0 | 0 | – | – | 0 | 0 |
| 53 | Hugh Sells | England | 1946 | 1946 | 1 | 2 | 46 | 26 | 23.00 | 0 | 0 | – | – | 1 | 0 |
| 54 | Thomas Thornton | England | 1946 | 1946 | 1 | 2 | 29 | 23 | 14.50 | 48 | 0 | – | – | 0 | 0 |
| 55 | Don Kenyon | England | 1946 | 1946 | 1 | 2 | 0 | 0 | 0.00 | 0 | 0 | – | – | 1 | 0 |
| 56 | Luke White | England | 1946 | 1946 | 1 | 2 | 75 | 46 | 37.50 | 0 | 0 | – | – | 0 | 0 |
| 57 | Leo Harrison † | England | 1946 | 1946 | 1 | 2 | 33 | 30 | 16.50 | 0 | 0 | – | – | 2 | 2 |
| 58 | Brian Trubshaw | England | 1946 | 1946 | 1 | 2 | 2 | 1 | 1.00 | 0 | 0 | – | – | 0 | 0 |
| 59 | Alan Shirreff ♠ | England | 1946 | 1946 | 1 | 2 | 16 | 16 | 8.00 | 216 | 6 | 4/39 | 17.66 | 0 | 0 |
| 60 | Bernard Constable | England | 1946 | 1946 | 1 | 2 | 71 | 56* | 71.00 | 186 | 5 | 5/131 | 26.20 | 2 | 0 |
| 61 | Myles Boddington | England | 1946 | 1946 | 1 | 2 | 23 | 23 | 11.50 | 18 | 0 | – | – | 1 | 0 |
| 62 | William Faulkner | England | 1946 | 1946 | 1 | 2 | 23 | 18 | 11.50 | 144 | 0 | – | – | 1 | 0 |
| 63 | Norman Gavin | England | 1946 | 1946 | 1 | 2 | 52 | 29 | 52.00 | 204 | 3 | 3/76 | 34.00 | 1 | 0 |
