= 1926 All England Badminton Championships =

Tournament information
- Sport: Badminton
- Location: Royal Horticultural Halls, Westminster, England, United Kingdom
- Dates: March 2–March 8, 1926
- Established: 1899
- Website: All England Championships

The 1926 All England Championships was a badminton tournament held at the Royal Horticultural Halls, Westminster, England from March 2 to March 8, 1926.

== Final results ==
Category	Winners	Runners-up	Score
Men's singles	(Republic of Ireland) Frank Devlin	(England) Albert Harbot	7–15, 15–5, 15–6
Women's singles	(England) Marjorie Barrett	(England) Margaret Tragett	11–7, 11–3
Men's doubles	(Republic of Ireland) Curly Mack & Frank Devlin	(England) Raoul du Roveray & J Vincent	15–3, 15–5
Women's doubles	(England) Violet Elton & (Republic of Ireland) A. M. Head	(England) Marjorie Barrett & Marian Horsley	15–9, 15–10
Mixed doubles	(Republic of Ireland) Frank Devlin & (England) Eveline Peterson	(Republic of Ireland) Curly Mack & A. M. Head	15–5, 15–9

=== Results ===
==== Men's singles ====
Second round
(Republic of Ireland) Frank Devlin	15	15
(England) A K Jones	6	8
(England) Sir George Thomas	15	10	15
(England) Frank Hodge	10	15	5
(England) Herbert Uber	15	15
(England) W B Jones	6	6
(England) William Swinden	15	15
(England) Edward Hawthorn	2	10
(England) Albert Harbot	15	15
(England) F I Atkin	2	12
(England) Henry Martin	9	15	15
(England) J D M McCallum	15	4	8
(England) N A Knox	15	15
(England) Hassan Ali Fyzee	8	9
(England) E Cardwell	15	15
(England) L Bracey-Forbes	12	2

Quarterfinals
(Republic of Ireland) Devlin	15	15
(England) Thomas	12	4
(England) Uber	15	15
(England) Swinden	7	7
(England) Harbot	15	15
(England) Martin	9	9
(England) Knox	15	15
(England) Cardwell	2	1

Semifinals
(Republic of Ireland) Devlin	15	15
(England) Uber	3	9
(England) Harbot	15	15
(England) Knox	10	6

Final
(Republic of Ireland) Devlin	7	15	15
(England) Harbot	15	5	6

==== Women's singles ====
Second round
(England) Marjorie Barrett	11	11
(England) Boumphrey	1	2
(England) Betty Uber	11	11
(England) W B Rowe	9	3
(England) I Nallard	11	11
(Wales) B Neville	5	5
(England) Nora Coop	11	11
(England) B Priter	4	2
(England) Margaret Tragett	14	11
(England) Manning	13	5
(Republic of Ireland) Dorothy Colpoys	11	11
(England) E Sainsbury	4	7
(England) W L Dearsley	11	4	11
(England) B M Emson	7	11	7
(England) M Emson	11	11
(England) M Reeves	3	5

Quarterfinals
(England) Barrett	11	11
(England) Uber	1	2
(England) Nallard	11	14
(England) Coop	5	11
(England) Tragett	11	4	11
(Republic of Ireland) Colpoys	6	11	8
(England) Dearsley	11	11	11
(England) Emson	2	13	5

Semifinals
(England) Barrett	11	11
(England) Nallard	2	6
(England) Tragett	11	11
(England) Dearsley	5	6

Final
(England) Barrett	11	11
(England) Tragett	7	3
