= 1925 All England Badminton Championships =

Tournament information
- Sport: Badminton
- Location: Royal Horticultural Halls, Westminster, England, United Kingdom
- Dates: March 3–March 8, 1925
- Established: 1899
- Website: All England Championships

The 1925 All England Championships was a badminton tournament held at the Royal Horticultural Halls, Westminster, England from March 3 to March 8, 1925.

== Final results ==
Category	Winners	Runners-up	Score
Men's singles	(Republic of Ireland) Frank Devlin	(England) Frank Hodge	11-15, 15-7, 18-15
Women's singles	(England) Margaret Stocks	(England) Marjorie Barrett	11–2, 11-7
Men's doubles	(England) Arthur Kenneth Jones & Herbert Uber	(Republic of Ireland) Curly Mack & R A Goff	15–8, 15–3
Women's doubles	(England) Margaret Tragett & Hazel Hogarth	(England) Violet Elton & (Republic of Ireland) A. M. Head	15-11, 15–9
Mixed doubles	(Republic of Ireland) Frank Devlin & (England) Kitty McKane	(England) Frank Hodge & Violet Elton	15-3, 15-9

=== Results ===
==== Men's singles ====
First round
(England) J. D. M. McCallum	5	3
(Republic of Ireland) Frank Devlin	15	15
(England) Henry Martin	15	13	15
(England) G. Atkinson	7	15	8
(England) William Swinden	15	15
(England) F. I. Atkin	14	8
(England) L. B. Feeny	15	15
(England) Carolus E. B. St. Ruth	4	9
(England) Frank Hodge	15	15
(England) N. A. Knox	6	4
(England) Arthur Kenneth Jones	15	15
(England) Hassan Ali Fyzee	9	9
(England) Sir George Thomas	15	15
(England) Albert Harbot	3	0
(England) K. G. Livingstone	15	15
(England) M. Rothwell-Jackson	7	10

Quarterfinals
(Republic of Ireland) Devlin	18	15
(England) Martin	16	3
(England) Swinden	15	10	15
(England) Feeny	11	15	4
(England) Hodge	15	15
(England) Jones	10	11
(England) Thomas	15	15
(England) Livingstone	13	3

Semifinals
(Republic of Ireland) Devlin	15	15
(England) Swinden	3	7
(England) Hodge	15	15
(England) Thomas	8	4

Final
(Republic of Ireland) Devlin	11	15	18
(England) Hodge	15	7	15

==== Women's singles ====
First round
(England) Margaret Stocks	11	11
(England) G M Dutton	5	1
(England) L M Singleton	11	11
(England) M Emson	2	2
(England) Margaret Tragett	6	11	11
(Wales) B Neville	11	7	9
(England) E St Ruth	11	11
(England) Burlton-Bennet	1	3
(England) Marjorie Barrett	11	11
(England) Neyd	3	4
(England) J C B Nias	11	11
(England) M C Snaith	9	6
(England) I Nallard	11	11
(England) F Bowring	0	3
(England) W B Rowe	11	11
(Republic of Ireland) Dorothy Colpoys	5	8

Quarterfinals
(England) Stocks	11	11
(England) Singleton	3	5
(England) Tragett	11	11
(England) St Ruth	8	1
(England) Barrett	11	11
(England) Nias	3	0
(England) Nallard	11	11
(England) Rowe	3	0

Semifinals
(England) Stocks	8	11	11
(England) Tragett	11	4	3
(England) Barrett	11	11	11
(England) Nallard	14	6	0

Final
(England) Stocks	11	11
(England) Barrett	2	7
