= 1927 All England Badminton Championships =

Tournament information
- Sport: Badminton
- Location: Royal Horticultural Halls, Westminster, England, United Kingdom
- Dates: March 2–March 6, 1927
- Established: 1899
- Website: All England Championships

The 1927 All England Championships was a badminton tournament held at the Royal Horticultural Halls, Westminster, England from March 2 to March 6, 1927.

== Final results ==
Category	Winners	Runners-up	Score
Men's singles	(Republic of Ireland) Frank Devlin	(England) Albert Harbot	15-3, 15-7
Women's singles	(England) Marjorie Barrett	(England) Margaret Tragett	11-8, 11-3
Men's doubles	(Republic of Ireland) Curly Mack & Frank Devlin	(England) Raoul du Roveray & Albert Harbot	15-0, 7-15, 15-5
Women's doubles	(England) Margaret Tragett & Hazel Hogarth	(Wales) D Myers & (England) Violet Baddeley	5-15, 18-16, 15-8
Mixed doubles	(Republic of Ireland) Frank Devlin & (England) Eveline Peterson	(England) Sir George Thomas & Hazel Hogarth	15-11, 15-11

=== Results ===
==== Men's singles ====
Second round
(Republic of Ireland) Frank Devlin	15	15
(England) Prachey	8	0
(England) J D M McCallum	15	18
(England) MacTier	10	15
(England) Frank Hodge	15	15
(England) G W Gardener	8	1
(England) L B Feeny	15	15
(England) Walker	6	8
(England) Albert Harbot	15	15
(England) F I Atkin	5	5
(England) A K Jones	15	15
(England) Carolus E B St Ruth	10	5
(England) Thomas P. Dick	15	15
(England) Swindell	8	7
(England) Herbert Uber	15	15
(Republic of Ireland) Willoughby Hamilton	6	6

Quarterfinals
(Republic of Ireland) Devlin	15	15
(England) McCallum	10	12
(England) Hodge	15	15
(England) Feeny	5	2
(England) Harbot	15	15
(England) Jones	2	7
(England) Dick	15	15
(England) Uber	9	7

Semifinals
(Republic of Ireland) Devlin	15	15
(England) Hodge	8	4
(England) Harbot	10	18	15
(England) Dick	15	15	0

Final
(Republic of Ireland) Devlin	15	15
(England) Harbot	3	7

==== Women's singles ====
Round of 16
(England) Marjorie Barrett	w/o
(England) Manning
(England) A K Sutcliffe	11	5	11
(England) E Sturch	5	11	4
(England) Stokes	11	11
(England) M E Emson	0	8
(England) W L Dearsley	11	2	11
(England) E Holman-Cox	1	11	7
(England) Margaret Tragett	11	11
(England) F Waterhouse	0	0
(England) M B Phillips	11	11
(England) Maclehose	3	7
(England) Nora Coop	7	11	11
(England) E Sainsbury	11	4	5
(Republic of Ireland) Dorothy Colpoys	11	11
(England) R P Coles	1	1

Quarterfinals
(England) Barrett	11	11
(England) Sutcliffe	3	2
(England) Stokes	11	11
(England) Dearsley	2	5
(England) Tragett	11	11
(England) Phillips	5	2
(England) Coop	11	9	14
(Republic of Ireland) Colpoys	5	11	12

Semifinals
(England) Barrett	11	11
(England) Stokes	5	3
(England) Tragett	11	11
(England) Coop	1	6

Final
(England) Barrett	11	11
(England) Tragett	8	3
