= 1928 All England Badminton Championships =

Tournament information
- Sport: Badminton
- Location: Royal Horticultural Halls, Westminster, England, United Kingdom
- Dates: March 4–March 11, 1928
- Established: 1899
- Website: All England Championships

The 1928 All England Championships was a badminton tournament held at the Royal Horticultural Halls, Westminster, England from March 4 to March 11, 1928.

== Final results ==
Category	Winners	Runners-up	Score
Men's singles	(Republic of Ireland) Frank Devlin	(England) Albert Harbot	15-10, 15-6
Women's singles	(England) Margaret Tragett	(England) Nora Coop	11-3, 5-11, 11-5
Men's doubles	(England) Sir George Thomas & Frank Hodge	(England) Herbert Uber & A K Jones	15-9, 4-15, 15-9
Women's doubles	(England) Marjorie Barrett & Violet Elton	(England) Margaret Tragett & Hazel Hogarth	15-7, 15-9
Mixed doubles	(England) Albert Harbot & Margaret Tragett	(England) Sir George Thomas & Hazel Hogarth	15-7, 15-9

=== Results ===
==== Men's singles ====
Second round
(Republic of Ireland) Frank Devlin	15	15
(England) F I Atkin	1	10
(Scotland) J W A Bonar	12
(England) Herbert Uber	15	ret
(England) Sir George Thomas	15	15
(England) Dr H Crombie	12	11
(England) A. K. Jones	15	15
(England) Carolus E B St Ruth	5	9
(England) Albert Harbot	15	15
(England) H J Mason	2	4
(England) R Bracey-Forbes	13	15	15
(England) F W Percival	15	8	6
(England) Thomas P. Dick	15	15
(South Africa) Gerald Sherwell	3	12
(England) Alan Titherley	15	15
(England) B P Flight	3	7

Quarterfinals
(Republic of Ireland) Devlin	15	15
(Scotland) Bonar	10	4
(England) Thomas	18	15
(England) Jones	15	5
(England) Harbot	15	15
(England) Bracey-Forbes	4	4
(England) Dick	15	12	15
(England) Titherley	8	15	0

Semifinals
(Republic of Ireland) Devlin	15
(England) Thomas	13	ret
(England) Harbot	15	15
(England) Dick	3	3

Final
(Republic of Ireland) Devlin	15	15
(England) Harbot	10	6

==== Women's singles ====
Round of 16
(England) Margaret Tragett	11	11
(Wales) B Neville	2	5
(Scotland) J R Stewart	8	11	11
(England) Burgess-Smith	11	5	8
(England) Margaret Stocks	14	14
(England) Marjorie Barrett	10	12
(Republic of Ireland) Dorothy Colpoys	11	11
(England) Edgson-Wright	4	1
(England) Nora Coop	11	11
(England) Stevens	1	2
(England) R M Smith	11	11
(England) Wolsey	3	5
(England) E Sainsbury	11	11
(England) W L Dearsley	2	3
(England) G M Dutton	11	11
(England) M Mason	10	6

Quarterfinals
(England) Tragett	11	14
(Scotland) Stewart	5	9
(England) Stocks	5	11	11
(Republic of Ireland) Colpoys	11	8	9
(England) Coop	11	11
(England) Smith	8	2
(England) Sainsbury	6	11	11
(England) Dutton	11	3	1

Semifinals
(England) Tragett	11	6	11
(England) Stocks	4	11	5
(England) Coop	11	11
(England) Sainsbury	5	0

Final
(England) Tragett	11	5	11
(England) Coop	3	11	5
