= 1935 All England Badminton Championships =

Tournament information
- Sport: Badminton
- Location: Royal Horticultural Halls, Westminster, England, United Kingdom
- Dates: March 4–March 10, 1935
- Established: 1899
- Website: All England Championships

The 1935 All England Championships was a badminton tournament held at the Royal Horticultural Halls, Westminster, England from March 4 to March 10, 1935.

== Final results ==
Category	Winners	Runners-up	Score
Men's singles	(England) Raymond White	(England) Ralph Nichols	15-10, 15-7
Women's singles	(England) Betty Uber	(England) Alice Teague	11-1, 11-6
Men's doubles	(England) Raymond White & Donald Hume	(England) Ralph Nichols & Leslie Nichols	15-12, 15-13
Women's doubles	(England) Thelma Kingsbury & Marje Henderson	(England) Betty Uber & Diana Doveton	15-5, 9-15, 15-8
Mixed doubles	(England) Donald Hume & Betty Uber	(England) Raymond White & (Scotland) Marian Armstrong	15-3, 15-1

=== Results ===
==== Men's singles ====
Third round
(England) Raymond White +	15	15
(England) F C Sharp	8	6
(England) H E Baldwin	15	15
(India) Khaja Hamiduddin	7	11
(Republic of Ireland) Ian Maconachie +	15	15
(England) S C Minard	9	3
(Republic of Ireland) James Rankin +	15	15
(England) C Freeman-Wilcoxson	3	5
(England) Ralph Nichols	15	15
(Malayan Union) Ong Hock Sim	11	11
(England) Albert Harbot	15	15
(England) G M Robarls	11	8
(England) C H Whittaker +	15	12	15
(England) H Morland	9	15	8
(England) Donald Hume	15	15
(England) H F Chilton	1	4

Quarterfinals
(England) White	15	15
(England) Baldwin	7	11
(Republic of Ireland) Maconachie	15	17
(Republic of Ireland) Rankin	13	14
(England) Nichols	15	15
(England) Harbot	9	13
(England) Whittaker	15	15
(England) Hume	8	9

Semifinals
(England) White	15	15
(Republic of Ireland) Maconachie	12	5
(England) Nichols	15	15
(England) Whittaker	12	10

Final
(England) White	15	15
(England) Nichols	10	7

+ Denotes seed

==== Women's singles ====
Second round
(England) Betty Uber	9	11	11
(England) V E Child	11	3	0
(England) June Goodall	11	13
(England) E M Butler	3	10
(England) Thelma Kingsbury	11	11
(Republic of Ireland) Olive Wilson	2	9
(England) Daphne Young	7	11	11
(Republic of Ireland) Dorothy Colpoys	11	8	9
(England) Alice Teague^{[n]}	11	11
(England) Margaret Tragett	1	4
(Denmark) Ruth Fredriksen	11	14
(England) C D Newitt	3	11
(England) Diana Doveton	11	11
(England) Queenie Allen	8	4
(Guernsey) B B Randall	11	11
(England) K Ruston	5	3

Quarterfinals
(England) Uber	11	11
(England) Goodall	1	4
(England) Kingsbury	11	11
(England) Young	1	1
(England) Teague	11	11
(Denmark) Fredriksen	1	2
(England) Doveton	11	11
(Guernsey) Randall	3	5

Semifinals
(England) Uber	11	11
(England) Kingsbury	5	5
(England) Teague	11	11
(England) Doveton	7	1

Final
(England) Uber	11	11
(England) Teague	1	6

^{^[n]} Alice Woodroffe married and competed as Alice Teague
