= 1939 All England Badminton Championships =

Tournament details
- Dates: 7 March 1939– 12 March 1939
- Edition: 36th
- Venue: Royal Horticultural Hall
- Location: Westminster, England
- Official website: All England Championships

The 1939 All England Championships was a badminton tournament held at the Royal Horticultural Hall, Westminster, England from 7–12 March 1939.

It was the last to be held before the Second World War and would not reoccur until 1947.

== Final results ==
Category	Winners	Runners-up	Score
Men's singles	(Denmark) Tage Madsen	(England) Ralph Nichols	10-15, 18–13, 15–7
Women's singles	(Canada) Dorothy Walton	(England) Diana Doveton	11–4, 11–5
Men's doubles	(Republic of Ireland) Thomas Boyle & James Rankin	(England) Ralph Nichols & Leslie Nichols	15-4, 15-3
Women's doubles	(Denmark) Tonny Olsen & Ruth Dalsgaard	(England) Marjorie Barrett & Diana Doveton	15-11, 2-15, 17–15
Mixed doubles	(England) Ralph Nichols & Bessie Staples	(Republic of Ireland) James Rankin & Mavis Macnaughton	15-10, 6-15, 15-8

=== Results ===
==== Men's singles ====
Second round
(Denmark) Tage Madsen	15	15
(England) F C Sharp	3	0
(England) Leslie Nichols	15	15
(Denmark) Børge Frederiksen	11	10
(Malaysia) A S Samuel	15	15
(England) Tom Wingfield	5	7
(England) H E Baldwin	15	15
(Sweden) B Persson	6	9
(England) Ralph Nichols	15	15
(Denmark) Sven Stromann	8	6
(Denmark) Jan Schmidt	9	15	15
(England) M P Yoong	15	11	5
(England) Maurice Field	15	15
(England) R V M Messenger	8	9
(Denmark) Carl Frohlke	15	15
(Denmark) Erik Friis	11	7

Quarterfinals
(Denmark) Madsen	15	15
(England) Nichols L	2	2
(Malaysia) Samuel	12	18	15
(England) Baldwin	15	16	13
(England) Nichols R	15	17
(Denmark) Schmidt	12	15
(England) Field	15	15
(Denmark) Frohlke	7	4	14

Semifinals
(Denmark) Madsen	7	15	15
(Malaysia) Samuel	15	9	11
(England) Nichols R	15	15
(England) Field	11	5

Final
(Denmark) Madsen	10	18	15
(England) Nichols	15	13	7

==== Women's singles ====
Second round
(Canada) Dorothy Walton	11	11
(England) C Field	1	2
(Denmark) Tonny Olsen	11	11
(England) A Simpson	4	2
(England) Daphne Young	11	11
(England) A Y Richardson	6	7
(Republic of Ireland) Mavis Macnaughton	11	11
(England) H Crichton	3	2
(England) Diana Doveton	11	11
(Denmark) A Holm	1	1
(England) Betty Uber	11	11
(England) J Ledwidge	0	0
(England) Queenie Allen	11	11
(United States) Elizabeth Pearson	3	0
(Denmark) Ruth Dalsgaard	11	8	12
(England) Bessie Staples	6	11	11

Quarterfinals
(Canada) Walton	12	11
(Denmark) Olsen	10	3
(England) Young	11	12
(Republic of Ireland) Macnaughton	7	10
(England) Doveton	11
(England) Uber	1	ret
(England) Allen	11	11
(Denmark) Dalsgaard	5	7

Semifinals
(Canada) Walton	8	11	11
(England) Young	11	7	0
(England) Doveton	11	11	11
(England) Allen	6	12	9

Final
(Canada) Walton	11	11
(England) Doveton	4	5
