= Irish Open (badminton) =

Badminton tournament held in Ireland

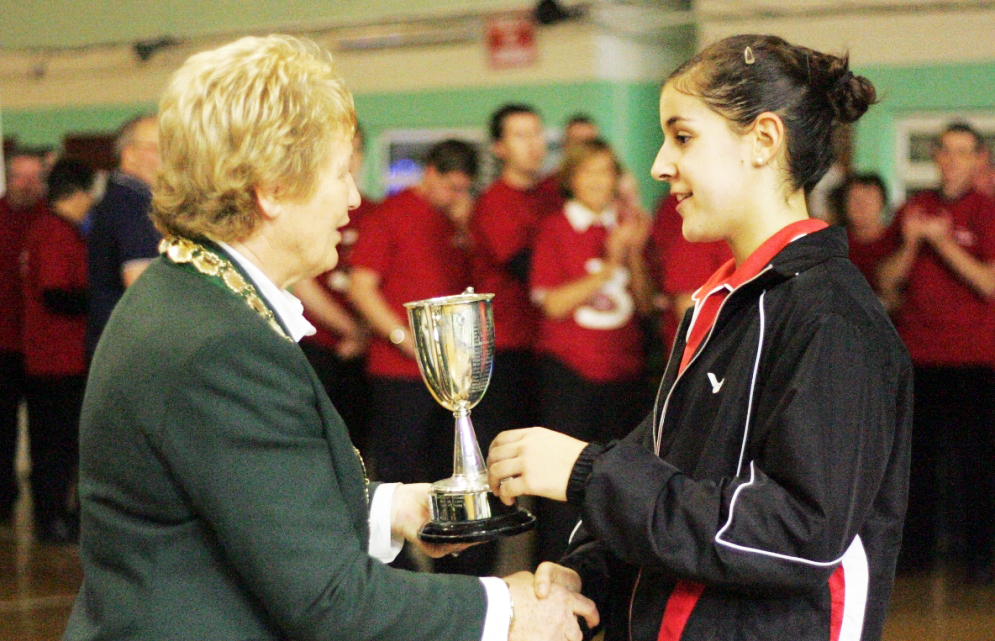
Carolina Marín, future Olympic champion, won her first senior title in the 2009 Irish International Championships.

The Irish International or Irish Open in badminton is an international open held in Ireland since 1902 and is thereby one of the oldest badminton tournaments in the world. It was however interrupted by the two World Wars. This tournament is currently a part of the European Badminton Circuit and takes place at the end of November every year as part of the home nations loop of international tournaments that include the Scottish Open and the Welsh Open in consecutive weeks. The tournament for most part and in recent years has been an International Challenge rated event. The recent exception was in 2012, 2017 & 2018 when the tournament was downgraded to International Series due to funding. Recent editions have been held in the Baldoyle Badminton Centre except for 2007 and 2011 tournaments which were held in Lisburn, Northern Ireland.

In 2016 the Irish Open moved to the new National Indoor Arena in Blanchardstown, Dublin, as the first ever event in the new state of the art arena before its official opening in January 2017. The December 2017 edition reverted to an International Series level tournament which saw three Irish players/pairs reach the final.

Notable past winners of the Irish Open are Carolina Marín (multiple Olympic and World Champion in women's singles) and multiple All England winner Tine Baun (nee Rasmussen). Marin's win in 2009 was the Spanish player's first senior international win while still a junior.

== Past winners ==
Year	Men's singles	Women's singles	Men's doubles	Women's doubles	Mixed doubles	Ref
1902	(Ireland) Blayney Hamilton	no competition	(Ireland) Willoughby Hamilton (Ireland) Blayney Hamilton	no competition	(Ireland) Blayney Hamilton (Ireland) R. H. Goff	
1903	(Ireland) Blayney Hamilton	no competition	(England) G. Lucas (England) R. D. Marshal	(England) Meriel Lucas (England) Mabel Hardy	(England) Leonard Ransford (England) Mabel Hardy	
1904	(Ireland) Blayney Hamilton	no competition	(Ireland) Blayney Hamilton (Ireland) T. D. Good	(England) Meriel Lucas (England) Ethel B. Thomson	(England) Leonard Ransford (England) Mabel Hardy	
1905	(England) Henry Norman Marrett	no competition	(England) Henry Norman Marrett (England) Albert Prebble	(England) Meriel Lucas (England) Ethel B. Thomson	(England) Norman Wood (England) Hazel Hogarth	
1906	(England) Henry Norman Marrett	no competition	(England) Henry Norman Marrett (England) Albert Prebble	no competition	(England) Norman Wood (England) Hazel Hogarth	
1907	(Ireland) Arthur Cave	no competition	(Ireland) Blayney Hamilton (Ireland) T. D. Good	(England) Hazel Hogarth (England) Muriel Bateman	(England) Norman Wood (England) Hazel Hogarth	
1908	(Ireland) Arthur Cave	no competition	(Ireland) Blayney Hamilton (Ireland) T. D. Good	(England) Meriel Lucas (England) Margaret Larminie	(Ireland) Blayney Hamilton (England) Meriel Lucas	
1909	(Ireland) Arthur Cave	no competition	(England) Frank Chesterton (England) George Thomas	(England) Hazel Hogarth (England) Muriel Bateman	(England) George Thomas (England) Hazel Hogarth	
1910	(England) Frank Chesterton	no competition	(England) Frank Chesterton (England) George Thomas	(England) Muriel Bateman (England) Margaret Larminie	(England) George Thomas (England) Margaret Larminie	
1911	(England) George Thomas	no competition	(England) Guy A. Sautter (England) George Thomas	(England) Lavinia Clara Radeglia (England) Margaret Larminie	(England) George Thomas (England) Margaret Larminie	
1912	(England) Guy A. Sautter	no competition	(England) Guy A. Sautter (England) George Thomas	(England) Lavinia Clara Radeglia (England) Margaret Tragett	(England) George Thomas (England) Margaret Tragett	
1913	(England) George Thomas	no competition	(England) Guy A. Sautter (England) George Thomas	(England) Robert Plews (England) Margaret Tragett	(England) Guy A. Sautter (England) Hazel Hogarth	
1914	(England) George Thomas	no competition	(Ireland) Robert Plews (England) George Thomas	(England) Lavinia Clara Radeglia (Ireland) Constance Pierson	(England) George Thomas (England) Hazel Hogarth	
1915– 1919	no competition due to World War I					
1920	(England) George Thomas	no competition	(Ireland) Frederick Kennedy (Ireland) R. H. Lambert	(England) Hazel Hogarth (England) Lavinia Clara Radeglia	(England) George Thomas (England) Hazel Hogarth	
1921	(England) George Thomas	no competition	(Ireland) Frank Devlin (Ireland) Robert Plews	(England) Hazel Hogarth (Ireland) E. F. Stewart	(England) George Thomas (England) Hazel Hogarth	
1922	(England) Guy A. Sautter	no competition	(Republic of Ireland) Gordon 'Curly' Mack (England) George Thomas	(England) Marjorie Barrett (England) Kitty McKane	(England) Guy A. Sautter (England) Eveline Peterson	
1923	(Republic of Ireland) Gordon 'Curly' Mack	no competition	(Republic of Ireland) Gordon 'Curly' Mack (England) George Thomas	(Republic of Ireland) D. Pilkington (Republic of Ireland) D. Anderson	(Republic of Ireland) Frank Devlin (Republic of Ireland) E. F. Stewart	
1924	(Republic of Ireland) Frank Devlin	(England) Marian Horsley	(Republic of Ireland) Gordon 'Curly' Mack (England) George Thomas	(England) A. M. Head (England) Kitty McKane	(Republic of Ireland) Gordon 'Curly' Mack (England) Margaret Tragett	
1925	(Republic of Ireland) Gordon 'Curly' Mack	(England) Margaret Tragett	(Republic of Ireland) Gordon 'Curly' Mack (Republic of Ireland) R. A. Goff	(England) A. M. Head (Republic of Ireland) M. Homan	(Republic of Ireland) Gordon 'Curly' Mack (England) Margaret Tragett	
1926	(Republic of Ireland) Frank Devlin	(England) Margaret Tragett	(England) Raoul du Roveray (England) George Thomas	(England) Marian Horsley (England) Violet Elton	(England) Frank Hodge (England) Violet Elton	
1927	(England) George Thomas	(Republic of Ireland) D. Pilkington	(Republic of Ireland) Gordon 'Curly' Mack (England) George Thomas	(Republic of Ireland) D. Pilkington (Republic of Ireland) Ada Good	(Republic of Ireland) Gordon 'Curly' Mack (Republic of Ireland) A. M. Head	
1928	(England) Albert Harbot	(England) Marjorie Barrett	(England) Albert Harbot (England) George Thomas	(England) Marjorie Barrett (England) Violet Elton	(England) Albert Harbot (England) Violet Elton	
1929	(Republic of Ireland) Willoughby Hamilton	(Republic of Ireland) Derreen Good	(England) J. D. M. McCallum (England) George Thomas	(Republic of Ireland) D. Pilkington (Republic of Ireland) Ada Good	(Scotland) James Barr (Scotland) C. T. Duncan	
1930	(Republic of Ireland) Willoughby Hamilton	(England) Betty Uber	(England) Herbert Uber (England) Donald Hume	(England) Marian Horsley (England) Betty Uber	(England) Herbert Uber (England) Betty Uber	
1931	(Republic of Ireland) Willoughby Hamilton	(England) Marian Horsley	(Republic of Ireland) Gordon 'Curly' Mack (Republic of Ireland) Frank Devlin	(England) Marian Horsley (Scotland) C. T. Duncan	(Republic of Ireland) Frank Devlin (England) Marian Horsley	
1932	(England) Raymond White	(England) Betty Uber	(England) Donald Hume (England) Ralph Nichols	(England) Marian Horsley (England) Betty Uber	(England) Donald Hume (England) Betty Uber	
1933	(Republic of Ireland) Willoughby Hamilton	(Republic of Ireland) Olive Wilson	(Republic of Ireland) Thomas Boyle (Republic of Ireland) James Rankin	(England) Marian Horsley (Republic of Ireland) Olive Wilson	(Republic of Ireland) James Rankin (Republic of Ireland) Mavis Hamilton	
1934	(England) Raymond White	(England) Thelma Kingsbury	(Republic of Ireland) Ian Maconachie (Republic of Ireland) Willoughby Hamilton	(England) Marian Horsley (England) Betty Uber	(England) Donald Hume (England) Betty Uber	
1935	(Republic of Ireland) James Rankin	(England) Alice Teague	(Republic of Ireland) Ian Maconachie (Republic of Ireland) James Rankin	(England) Marian Horsley (Republic of Ireland) Olive Wilson	(Republic of Ireland) Ian Maconachie (England) Marian Horsley	
1936	(England) Ralph Nichols	(England) Thelma Kingsbury	(Republic of Ireland) Ian Maconachie (Republic of Ireland) James Rankin	(England) Marian Horsley (England) Betty Uber	(England) Donald Hume (England) Betty Uber	
1937	(Republic of Ireland) James Rankin	(Scotland) Elizabeth Anderson	(Republic of Ireland) Ian Maconachie (Republic of Ireland) James Rankin	(Republic of Ireland) Mavis Macnaughton (England) Norma Stoker	(Republic of Ireland) James Rankin (Republic of Ireland) Olive Wilson	
1938	(Republic of Ireland) Thomas Boyle	(England) Daphne Young	(England) Kenneth Wilson (England) Alan Titherley	(England) Daphne Young (England) Norma Stoker	(Republic of Ireland) Thomas Boyle (Republic of Ireland) Olive Wilson	
1939	(Malaysia) A. S. Samuel	(Republic of Ireland) Mavis Macnaughton	(Republic of Ireland) Thomas Boyle (Republic of Ireland) James Rankin	(Republic of Ireland) Mavis Macnaughton (Republic of Ireland) Olive Wilson	(Republic of Ireland) Thomas Boyle (Republic of Ireland) Olive Wilson	
1940– 1946	no competition due to World War II					
1947	(England) Noel B. Radford	(England) Queenie Allen	(Republic of Ireland) Thomas Boyle (Republic of Ireland) James Rankin	(England) Queenie Allen (England) Betty Uber	(England) Ralph Nichols (England) Bessie Shearlaw	
1948	(England) Noel B. Radford	(England) Queenie Allen	(England) Noel B. Radford (Republic of Ireland) Frank Peard	(Republic of Ireland) Nora Conway (Republic of Ireland) Barbara J. Good	(England) Tom Wingfield (England) V. E. Duringer	
1949	(Federation of Malaya) Ong Poh Lim	(England) Queenie Allen	(Federation of Malaya) Ong Poh Lim (Federation of Malaya) Lim Kee Fong	(England) Queenie Allen (England) Betty Uber	(England) Harold Marsland (England) Queenie Allen	
1950	(Republic of Ireland) Frank Peard	(Scotland) Nancy Horner	(Republic of Ireland) Frank Peard (Republic of Ireland) Jim FitzGibbon	(Republic of Ireland) Nora Conway (Republic of Ireland) B. Potter	(Republic of Ireland) James C. Mackay (Scotland) Nancy Horner	
1951	(Federation of Malaya) Eddy B. Choong	(England) Elisabeth O'Beirne	(England) Harold Marsland (England) Kenneth Greasley	(England) Elisabeth O'Beirne (Federation of Malaya) Amy Choong	(Federation of Malaya) Eddy B. Choong (Federation of Malaya) Amy Choong	
1952	(Federation of Malaya) Eddy B. Choong	(Republic of Ireland) Jean Lawless	(Federation of Malaya) David E. L. Choong (Federation of Malaya) Eddy B. Choong	(Republic of Ireland) Jean Lawless (Republic of Ireland) Barbara J. Good	(Federation of Malaya) Heah Hock Aun (England) Joy Saunders	
1953	(Federation of Malaya) Eddy B. Choong	(England) Iris Cooley	(Federation of Malaya) David E. L. Choong (Federation of Malaya) Eddy B. Choong	(England) Iris Cooley (England) June White	(Federation of Malaya) Eddy B. Choong (England) June White	
1954	(New Zealand) Jeffrey Robson	(New Zealand) Heather Robson	(Republic of Ireland) Frank Peard (Republic of Ireland) Jim FitzGibbon	(England) Iris Cooley (England) June White	(Scotland) Wilfred Robinson (Scotland) Nancy Horner	
1955	(England) Tony Jordan	(England) Iris Cooley	(England) Warwick Shute (England) John Best	(England) Iris Cooley (England) June White	(England) Tony Jordan (England) June White	
1956	(Republic of Ireland) James Doyle	(Republic of Ireland) Mary O'Sullivan	(Scotland) Alastair Russel (Scotland) Alistair McIntyre	(Scotland) Marjory B. Forrester (Scotland) Maggie A. McIntosh	(Republic of Ireland) Ray Smyth (Republic of Ireland) Sheila Smyth	
1957	(Federation of Malaya) Eddy B. Choong	(England) Iris Rogers	(Federation of Malaya) Eddy B. Choong (Federation of Malaya) Oon Chong Teik	(England) Iris Rogers (England) June Timperley	(England) Tony Jordan (England) June Timperley	
1958	(Federation of Malaya) Oon Chong Jin	(Republic of Ireland) Yvonne Kelly	(Federation of Malaya) Oon Chong Jin (Federation of Malaya) Oon Chong Teik	(Republic of Ireland) Catherine Dunglison (Republic of Ireland) Gladys Massie	(Scotland) Mac Henderson (Scotland) Margaret Mackintosh	
1959	(England) Trevor Coates	(England) Heather Ward	(England) Tony Jordan (England) Ronald Lockwood	(England) Iris Rogers (England) June Timperley	(England) Tony Jordan (England) June Timperley	
1960	(Scotland) Robert McCoig	(Republic of Ireland) Mary O'Sullivan	(Scotland) Robert McCoig (Scotland) Frank Shannon	(Republic of Ireland) Yvonne Kelly (Republic of Ireland) Mary O'Sullivan	(Scotland) Robert McCoig (Scotland) Wilma Tyre	
1961	(England) Trevor Coates	(England) Ursula Smith	(England) Hugh Findlay (England) Ronald Lockwood	(Republic of Ireland) Sue Peard (Republic of Ireland) Lena Rea	(England) Tony Jordan (England) June Timperley	
1962	(Thailand) Charoen Wattanasin	(England) Ursula Smith	(Scotland) Robert McCoig (Scotland) Frank Shannon	(Republic of Ireland) Yvonne Kelly (Republic of Ireland) Mary O'Sullivan	(Scotland) Robert McCoig (Scotland) Wilma Tyre	
1963	(England) Colin Beacom	(England) Ursula Smith	(England) Tony Jordan (England) Peter Wadell	(England) Brenda Parr (England) Jennifer Pritchard	(England) Kenneth Derrick (England) Margaret Barrand	
1964	(Scotland) Robert McCoig	(United States) Judy Hashman	(Scotland) Robert McCoig (Scotland) Frank Shannon	(Republic of Ireland) Sue Peard (United States) Judy Hashman	(Scotland) Robert McCoig (United States) Judy Hashman	
1965	(New Zealand) Richard Purser	(England) Angela Bairstow	(England) Roger Mills (England) David Horton	(England) Ursula Smith (England) Jennifer Pritchard	(England) John Havers (England) Margaret Barrand	
1966	(Singapore) Lee Kin Tat	(Republic of Ireland) Mary Bryan	(Scotland) Robert McCoig (Scotland) Mac Henderson	(Republic of Ireland) Yvonne Kelly (Republic of Ireland) Mary Bryan	(Scotland) Mac Henderson (Republic of Ireland) Catherine Dunglison	
1967	(South Africa) Alan Parsons	(England) Angela Bairstow	(England) Roger Mills (England) David Horton	(England) Margaret Boxall (England) Sue Pound	(England) Roger Mills (England) Iris Rogers	
1968	(Singapore) Lee Kin Tat	(Republic of Ireland) Mary Bryan	(Scotland) Ian Hume (Scotland) Jim McNeillage	(Republic of Ireland) Yvonne Kelly (Republic of Ireland) Mary Bryan	(Scotland) Robert McCoig (Scotland) Mary Thompson	
1969	(England) Ray Sharp	(England) Gillian Perrin	(England) David Eddy (England) Roger Powell	(England) Margaret Boxall (England) Susan Whetnall	(England) Tony Jordan (England) Susan Whetnall	
1970	(Scotland) Robert McCoig	(Republic of Ireland) Yvonne Kelly	(Scotland) Robert McCoig (Scotland) Fraser Gow	(Republic of Ireland) Yvonne Kelly (Republic of Ireland) Sue Peard	(Scotland) Robert McCoig (Scotland) Helen Kelly	
1971	(England) Derek Talbot	(England) Margaret Beck	(England) Elliot Stuart (England) Derek Talbot	(England) Margaret Beck (England) Julie Rickard	(England) Derek Talbot (England) Gillian Gilks	
1972	(Northern Ireland) Colin Bell	(Republic of Ireland) Yvonne Kelly	(Northern Ireland) Adrian Bell (Northern Ireland) Peter Moore	(Republic of Ireland) Yvonne Kelly (Republic of Ireland) Mary Bryan	(Northern Ireland) John McCloy (Republic of Ireland) Mary Bryan	
1973	(Northern Ireland) Colin Bell	(Northern Ireland) Barbara Beckett	(Northern Ireland) Adrian Bell (Northern Ireland) Colin Bell	(Northern Ireland) Barbara Beckett (Republic of Ireland) Lena McAleese	(Northern Ireland) Adrian Bell (Northern Ireland) Barbara Beckett	
1974	(Scotland) Robert McCoig	(South Africa) Dorte Tyghe	(Scotland) Jim Ansari (Scotland) John Britton	(South Africa) Barbara Lord (South Africa) Dorthe Tyghe	(Scotland) Fraser Gow (Scotland) Christine Stewart	
1975	(Netherlands) Rob Ridder	(Netherlands) Joke van Beusekom	(South Africa) William Kerr (South Africa) Kenneth Parsons	(Netherlands) Marjan Luesken (Netherlands) Joke van Beusekom	(Netherlands) Rob Ridder (Netherlands) Marjan Ridder	
1976	(England) Michael Wilks	(Northern Ireland) Barbara Beckett	(England) Peter Bullivant (England) Michael Wilks	(Republic of Ireland) Yvonne Kelly (Northern Ireland) Barbara Beckett	(Northern Ireland) John Scott (Northern Ireland) Barbara Beckett	
1977	(England) Tim Goode	(Scotland) Pamela Hamilton	(England) Tim Goode (England) Duncan Bridge	(Republic of Ireland) Mary Dinan (Republic of Ireland) Wendy Orr	(Northern Ireland) John Scott (Scotland) Pamela Hamilton	
1978	(New Zealand) Richard Purser	(Northern Ireland) Dorothy Cunningham	(New Zealand) Richard Purser (New Zealand) Bryan Purser	(Scotland) Christine Stewart (Scotland) Anne Johnstone	(Scotland) Billy Gilliland (Scotland) Joanna Flockhart	
1979	(England) Brian Wallwork	(England) Sally Leadbeater	(England) Duncan Bridge (England) Ray Rofe	(England) Kathleen Redhead (England) Diane Simpson	(England) Duncan Bridge (England) Kathleen Redhead	
1980	(Scotland) Dan Travers	(Norway) Else Thoresen	(Scotland) Dan Travers (Scotland) Gordon Hamilton	(Scotland) Christine Heatly (Scotland) Joy Reid	(Northern Ireland) Frazer Evans (Northern Ireland) Diane Underwood	
1981	(England) Andy Goode	(England) Helen Troke	(England) Gary Scott (England) Andy Goode	(England) Jill Pringle (England) Mary Leeves	(Netherlands) Rob Ridder (Netherlands) Marjan Ridder	
1982	(Czechoslovakia) Michal Malý	(Scotland) Pamela Hamilton	(Scotland) Billy Gilliland (Scotland) Dan Travers	(Scotland) Pamela Hamilton (Scotland) Alison Fulton	(Scotland) Billy Gilliland (Scotland) Christine Heatly	
1983	(England) Joe Ford	(Scotland) Pamela Hamilton	(Scotland) Billy Gilliland (Scotland) Dan Travers	(England) Fiona Elliott (England) Jill Pringle	(Scotland) Billy Gilliland (Scotland) Christine Heatly	
1984	(England) Kevin Jolly	(England) Sally Podger	(England) Dipak Tailor (England) Chris Dobson	(England) Sally Podger (England) Barbara Sutton	(Scotland) Billy Gilliland (Scotland) Christine Heatly	
1985	(England) Kevin Jolly	(England) Fiona Elliott	(Scotland) Billy Gililand (Scotland) Dan Travers	(England) Fiona Elliott (England) Alison Fischer	(Scotland) Billy Gilliland (Scotland) Christine Heatly	
1986	(Scotland) Alex White	(England) Alison Fisher	(Scotland) Alex White (Scotland) Dan Travers	(England) Alison Fischer (England) Caroline Gay	(Scotland) Dan Travers (Scotland) Morag McKay	
1987	(Scotland) Alex White	(England) Sara Halsall	(Scotland) Alex White (Scotland) Iain Pringle	(England) Karen Beckman (England) Sara Halsall	(England) Mike Tredgett (England) Karen Beckman	
1988	(Scotland) Alex White	(Scotland) Anne Gibson	(Scotland) Alex White (Scotland) Iain Pringle	(Poland) Bozena Haracz (Poland) Bozena Siemieniec	(England) Nick Ponting (England) Julie Munday	
1989	(Scotland) Anthony Gallagher	(England) Suzanne Louis	(Scotland) Dan Travers (Scotland) Ken Middlemiss	(Scotland) Jenny Allen (Scotland) Elinor Allen	(England) Miles Johnson (England) Suzanne Louis	
1990 (Feb.)	(Canada) Iain Sydie	(Sweden) Charlotta Wihlborg	(West Germany) Stephan Kuhl (West Germany) Kai Mitteldorf	(Sweden) Charlotta Wihlborg (Sweden) Margit Borg	(England) Peter Holden (England) Alison Fisher	
1990 (Dec.)	(Soviet Union) Andrey Antropov	(Soviet Union) Irina Serova	(England) Mike Brown (England) Chris Hunt	(Germany) Katrin Schmidt (Germany) Kerstin Ubben	(Germany) Michael Keck (Soviet Union) Irina Serova	
1991	(Netherlands) Jeroen van Dijck	(England) Fiona Smith	(England) Nick Ponting (England) Dave Wright	(England) Alison Humby (England) Joanne Wright	(England) Nick Ponting (England) Joanne Wright	
1992	(Netherlands) Chris Bruil	(Commonwealth of Independent States) Marina Andrievskaya	(Commonwealth of Independent States) Andrey Antropov (Commonwealth of Independent States) Nikolai Zuyev	(Commonwealth of Independent States) Marina Andrievskaya (Commonwealth of Independent States) Marina Yakusheva	(Denmark) Lars Pedersen (Denmark) Anne Mette Bille	
1993	(England) Darren Hall	(England) Joanne Muggeridge	(England) Simon Archer (England) Julian Robertson	(England) Nichola Beck (England) Joanne Davies	(England) Simon Archer (England) Joanne Davies	
1994	(Sweden) Rikard Magnsson	(Sweden) Margit Borg	(Denmark) Jan Jørgensen (Denmark) Peder Nissen	(Denmark) Rikke Olsen (Denmark) Helene Kirkegaard	(Scotland) Kenny Middlemiss (Scotland) Elinor Allen	
1995	(Sweden) Rikard Magnsson	(Canada) Doris Piche	(Denmark) Jim Laugesen (Denmark) Thomas Stavngaard	(Denmark) Majken Vange (Denmark) Pernille Harder	(England) Julian Robertson (England) Lorraine Cole	
1996	(Denmark) Kenneth Jonassen	(Denmark) Pernille Harder	(Chinese Taipei) Lee Sung-yuan (Chinese Taipei) Yang Shih-jeng	(Denmark) Tanja Berg (Denmark) Mette Pedersen	(Denmark) Jesper Larsen (Denmark) Maiken Vange	
1997	(England) Darren Hall	(Sweden) Karolina Ericsson	(England) James Anderson (England) Ian Sullivan	(Denmark) Pernille Harder (Denmark) Mette Schjoldager	(England) Nathan Robertson (England) Joanne Wright	
1998	(England) Darren Hall	(England) Justine Willmott	(Bulgaria) Michail Popov (Bulgaria) Svetoslav Stojanov	(England) Joanne Wright (England) Gail Emms	(Belgium) Ruud Kuijten (Belgium) Manon Albinus	
1999	(England) Peter Knowles	(Japan) Miho Tanaka	(England) Graham Hurrell (England) James Anderson	(Japan) Hiromi Yamada (Japan) Naomi Murakami	(England) Anthony Clark (England) Lorraine Cole	
2000	(England) Michael Edge	(Scotland) Gao Yuan	(Scotland) Alastair Gatt (Scotland) Craig Robertson	(England) Emma Chaffin (England) Sarah Hardaker	(Scotland) Russell Hogg (Scotland) Kirsteen McEwan	
2001	(England) Mark Constable	(Canada) Kara Solmundson	(England) Stephen Foster (England) Robert Blair	(Denmark) Helle Nielsen (Denmark) Lene Mørk	(England) Robert Blair (England) Natalie Munt	
2002	(Denmark) Kenneth Jonassen	(Netherlands) Karina de Wit	(England) Robert Blair (England) Ian Palethorpe	(England) Ella Tripp (England) Joanne Wright	(England) Peter Jeffrey (England) Suzanne Rayappan	
2003	(Denmark) Kenneth Jonassen	(Denmark) Tine Rasmussen	(France) Svetoslav Stoyanov (France) Vincent Laigle	(Germany) Nicole Grether (Germany) Juliane Schenk	(England) Simon Archer (England) Donna Kellogg	
2004	(Denmark) Joachim Persson	(Bulgaria) Petya Nedelcheva	(Indonesia) Ruben Gordown Khosadalina (Indonesia) Aji Basuki Sindoro	(Denmark) Pernille Harder (Denmark) Helle Nielsen	(Indonesia) Ruben Gordown Khosadalina (England) Kelly Matthews	
2005	(India) Chetan Anand	(Russia) Ella Karachkova	(France) Mihail Popov (France) Svetoslav Stoyanov	(England) Jenny Wallwork (England) Sarah Bok	(Germany) Roman Spitko (Germany) Carina Mette	
2006	(Denmark) Jens-Kristian Leth	(Sweden) Sara Persson	(Germany) Thomas Tesche (Germany) Jochen Cassel	(Scotland) Emma Mason (Scotland) Imogen Bankier	(Belgium) Wouter Claes (Belgium) Nathalie Descamps	
2007	(Denmark) Peter Mikkelsen	(England) Elizabeth Cann	(United States) Khan Bob Malaythong (United States) Howard Bach	(Republic of Ireland) Bing Huang (Republic of Ireland) Chloe Magee	(United States) Howard Bach (United States) Eva Lee	
2008	(England) Rajiv Ouseph	(China) Zhang Xi	(England) Richard Eidestedt (England) Andrew Ellis	(Denmark) Helle Nielsen (Denmark) Marie Røpke	(Denmark) Jacob Chemnitz (Denmark) Marie Røpke	
2009	(Sweden) Henri Hurskainen	(Spain) Carolina Marín	(Denmark) Mads Conrad-Petersen (Denmark) Mads Pieler Kolding	(England) Mariana Agathangelou (England) Heather Olver	(Denmark) Mikkel Delbo Larsen (Denmark) Mie Schjøtt-Kristensen	
2010	(Denmark) Hans-Kristian Vittinghus	(Scotland) Susan Egelstaff	(England) Chris Adcock (England) Andrew Ellis	(Denmark) Maria Helsbøl (Denmark) Anne Skelbæk	(England) Chris Adcock (Scotland) Imogen Bankier	
2011	(England) Rajiv Ouseph	(Chinese Taipei) Pai Hsiao-ma	(Poland) Adam Cwalina (Poland) Michał Łogosz	(Malaysia) Ng Hui Ern (Malaysia) Ng Hui Lin	(England) Marcus Ellis (England) Heather Olver	
2012	(Republic of Ireland) Scott Evans	(Denmark) Line Kjærsfeldt	(Netherlands) Jacco Arends (Netherlands) Jelle Maas	(Netherlands) Samantha Barning (Netherlands) Eefje Muskens	(Netherlands) Jorrit de Ruiter (Netherlands) Samantha Barning	
2013	(Malaysia) Ramdan Misbun	(United States) Beiwen Zhang	(Poland) Adam Cwalina (Poland) Przemyslaw Wacha	(Netherlands) Eefje Muskens (Netherlands) Selena Piek	(Netherlands) Jacco Arends (Netherlands) Selena Piek	
2014	(Hong Kong) Ng Ka Long	(Spain) Beatriz Corrales	(Poland) Adam Cwalina (Poland) Przemyslaw Wacha	(Sweden) Emelie Fabbeke (Denmark) Lena Grebak	(Denmark) Niclas Nøhr (Denmark) Sara Thygesen	
2015	(Denmark) Anders Antonsen	(Germany) Olga Konon	(Germany) Raphael Beck (Germany) Peter Käsbauer	(Bulgaria) Stefani Stoeva (Bulgaria) Gabriela Stoeva	(Denmark) Mathias Christiansen (Denmark) Lena Grebak	
2016	(Germany) Fabian Roth	(Denmark) Line Kjærsfeldt	(Germany) Jones Ralfy Jansen (Germany) Josche Zurwonne	(France) Emilie Lefel (France) Anne Tran	(Denmark) Mathias Christiansen (Denmark) Sara Thygesen	
2017	(Germany) Alexander Roovers	(Denmark) Anna Thea Madsen	(Scotland) Alexander Dunn (Scotland) Adam Hall	(France) Emilie Lefel (France) Anne Tran	(England) Gregory Mairs (England) Jenny Moore	
2018	(France) Léo Rossi	(South Korea) An Se-young	(South Korea) Choi Sol-gyu (South Korea) Seo Seung-jae	(England) Emily Westwood (Malaysia) Yang Li Lian	(Republic of Ireland) Sam Magee (Republic of Ireland) Chloe Magee	
2019	(France) Toma Junior Popov	(France) Qi Xuefei	(Germany) Jones Ralfy Jansen (Germany) Peter Käsbauer	(Denmark) Amalie Magelund (Denmark) Freja Ravn	(Denmark) Mathias Christiansen (Denmark) Alexandra Bøje	
2020	Cancelled (Note: This tournament, originally to be played from 11 to 14 November, was later cancelled due to the COVID-19 pandemic in the Republic of Ireland.)					
2021	(Malaysia) Yeoh Seng Zoe	(Chinese Taipei) Hsu Wen-chi	(Malaysia) Man Wei Chong (Malaysia) Tee Kai Wun	(Netherlands) Debora Jille (Netherlands) Cheryl Seinen	(Netherlands) Robin Tabeling (Netherlands) Selena Piek	
2022	(Denmark) Magnus Johannesen	(Japan) Riko Gunji	(Japan) Ayato Endo (Japan) Yuta Takei	(Chinese Taipei) Chang Ching-hui (Chinese Taipei) Yang Ching-tun	(England) Gregory Mairs (England) Jenny Moore	
2023	(Republic of Ireland) Nhat Nguyen	(Chinese Taipei) Yang Yu-chi	(Scotland) Christopher Grimley (Scotland) Matthew Grimley	(Denmark) Maiken Fruergaard (Denmark) Sara Thygesen	(Singapore) Terry Hee (Singapore) Jessica Tan	
2024	(Republic of Ireland) Nhat Nguyen	(Japan) Sakura Masuki	(Denmark) William Kryger Boe (Denmark) Christian Faust Kjær	(Denmark) Natasja Anthonisen (Denmark) Maiken Fruergaard	(England) Callum Hemming (England) Estelle van Leeuwen	
2025	(France) Arnaud Merklé	(South Korea) Kim Ga-ram	(England) Alex Green (England) Zach Russ	(South Korea) Kim Min-ji (South Korea) Lee Ye-na	(Denmark) Rasmus Espersen (Denmark) Amalie Cecilie Kudsk	
2026	(Denmark) Victor Ørding Kauffmann	(South Korea) Kim Min-ji	(South Korea) Jin Sung-ik (South Korea) Lee Hyeong-woo	(South Korea) Lee Seung-hee (South Korea) Park Min-ji	(Denmark) Jesper Toft (Denmark) Amalie Cecilie Kudsk	

== Performances by nation ==
As of the 2026 edition

Rank	Nation	MS	WS	MD	WD	XD	Total
1	England	38	37	41	50.5	53.5	220
2	Ireland*	24	15	20	22.5	17	98.5
3	Scotland	9	8	19	6.5	18.5	61
4	Denmark	10	5	4	11.5	10	40.5
5	Malaya; Malaysia	9		6	2	2	19
6	Netherlands	3	2	1	4	5	15
7	Germany	2	1	5	2	1.5	11.5
8	Sweden	3	4		1.5		8.5
9	France	3	1	2	2		8
10	South Korea		3	2	2		7
11	Soviet Union; CIS; Russia	1	3	1	1	0.5	6.5
12	Chinese Taipei		3	1	1		5
12	Japan		3	1	1		5
12	New Zealand	3	1	1			5
12	United States		2	1	0.5	1.5	5
16	Poland			3	1		4
16	South Africa	1	1	1	1		4
18	Bulgaria		1	1	1		3
18	Canada	1	2				3
18	Singapore	2				1	3
21	Belgium					2	2
21	Northern Ireland			2			2
21	Spain		2				2
24	Indonesia			1		0.5	1.5
25	China			1			1
25	Czechoslovakia	1					1
25	Hong Kong	1					1
25	India	1					1
25	Norway		1				1
25	Thailand	1					1
Total		113	96	113	111	113	546

* Host nation
