= Diana Doveton =

English badminton player

Personal information
- Born: 29 October 1910 India
- Died: 12 May 1987 (aged 76) Bath

Sport
- Country: England
- Sport: Badminton

Diana Alice Doveton (1910–1987) was an English international badminton player.

== Badminton career ==
Doverton was born in 1910. She was a two-time winner of the All England Open Badminton Championships. She won the women's 1937 All England Badminton Championships and 1938 All England Badminton Championships doubles with Betty Uber.

She also won the 1939 Scottish Open and 1935 French Open.

== Achievements ==
=== International tournaments (6 titles, 10 runners-up) ===
Women's doubles
| Year | Tournament | Opponent | Score | Result |
|---|---|---|---|---|
| 1936 | Irish Open | (England) Thelma Kingsbury | 1–11, 3–11 | (silver) Runner-up |
| 1937 | All England Open | (England) Thelma Kingsbury | 0–11, 0–11 | (silver) Runner-up |
| 1939 | All England Open | (Canada) Dorothy Walton | 4–11, 5–11 | (silver) Runner-up |

Women's doubles
| Year | Tournament | Partner | Opponent | Score | Result |
|---|---|---|---|---|---|
| 1931 | Welsh International | (England) Nora Coop | (England) Hazel Hogarth (England) Thelma Kingsbury | 6–15, 11–15 | (silver) Runner-up |
| 1935 | All England Open | (England) Betty Uber | (England) Marje Henderson (England) Thelma Kingsbury | 5–15, 15–9, 8–15 | (silver) Runner-up |
| 1935 | French Open | (England) Betty Uber | (Scotland) Marian Armstrong (England) Margaret Tragett | 15–0, 15–5 | (gold) Winner |
| 1936 | Irish Open | (England) Thelma Kingsbury | (England) Marian Horsley (England) Betty Uber | 7–15, 10–15 | (silver) Runner-up |
| 1936 | All England Open | (England) Betty Uber | (England) Marje Henderson (England) Thelma Kingsbury | 10–15, 15–5, 7–15 | (silver) Runner-up |
| 1937 | All England Open | (England) Betty Uber | (England) Marje Henderson (England) Thelma Kingsbury | 17–18, 15–1, 15–2 | (gold) Winner |
| 1938 | All England Open | (England) Betty Uber | (England) Marje Henderson (England) Marian Horsley | 15–6, 15–1 | (gold) Winner |
| 1938 | Welsh International | (England) Betty Uber | (England) Queenie Allen (England) Bessie Staples | 15–6, 15–6 | (gold) Winner |
| 1939 | All England Open | (England) Marjorie Barrett | (Denmark) Tonny Olsen (Denmark) Ruth Dalsgaard | 11–15, 15–2, 15–17 | (silver) Runner-up |
| 1939 | Denmark Open | (England) Bessie Staples | (England) Queenie Allen (Denmark) Ruth Dalsgaard | 15–12, 10–15, 11–15 | (silver) Runner-up |
| 1939 | Scottish Open | (England) Betty Uber | (Republic of Ireland) Mavis Macnaughton (Republic of Ireland) Olive Wilson | 15–4, 15–4 | (gold) Winner |

Mixed doubles
| Year | Tournament | Partner | Opponent | Score | Result |
|---|---|---|---|---|---|
| 1935 | French Open | (England) Ralph Nichols | (England) Geoffrey J. Fish (England) Betty Uber | 15–11, 15–10 | (gold) Winner |
| 1939 | Denmark Open | (England) Raymond M. White | (England) Ralph Nichols (England) Bessie Staples | 14–17, 7–15 | (silver) Runner-up |
