= 1929 All England Badminton Championships =

Tournament information
- Sport: Badminton
- Location: Royal Horticultural Halls, Westminster, England, United Kingdom
- Dates: March 4–March 10, 1929
- Established: 1899
- Website: All England Championships

The 1929 All England Championships was a badminton tournament held at the Royal Horticultural Halls, Westminster, England from March 4 to March 10, 1929.

== Final results ==
Category	Winners	Runners-up	Score
Men's singles	(Republic of Ireland) Frank Devlin	(England) Donald Hume	15–4, 15-1
Women's singles	(England) Marjorie Barrett	(England) F Waterhouse	11–8, 14-13
Men's doubles	(Republic of Ireland) Frank Devlin & Curly Mack	(England) Alan Titherley & Thomas P. Dick	15–2, 15-3
Women's doubles	(England) Marjorie Barrett & Violet Elton	(England) Marian Horsley & (Republic of Ireland) Dorothy Colpoys	15–13, 15-3
Mixed doubles	(Republic of Ireland) Frank Devlin & (England) Marian Horsley	(England) Herbert Uber & Betty Uber	15–8, 15-6

=== Results ===
==== Men's singles ====
Second round
(Republic of Ireland) Frank Devlin	15	17
(England) Thomas P. Dick	7	16
(England) Alan Titherley
(Scotland) John William Alfred Bonar	16	15	15
(England) H E Skeet	18	9	10
(England) W R Burton	15	6	17
(England) F C Day	3	15	15
(England) Donald Hume	15	18
(England) Sir George Thomas	3	17
(England) K G Livingstone	15	15
(England) Eric William L Cowan	5	2
(England) W B Jones	w/o
(England) Herbert Uber
(Republic of Ireland) Willoughby Hamilton	18	14	15
(England) F W Percival	13	17	11

Quarterfinals
(Republic of Ireland) Devlin	15	15
(England) Titherley	7	6
(Scotland) Bonar	15	15
(England) Burton	0	5
(England) Hume	15	15
(England) Livingstone	12	12
(England) Jones	9	13
(Republic of Ireland) Hamilton	15	18

Semifinals
(Republic of Ireland) Devlin	15	15
(Scotland) Bonar	8	8
(England) Hume	15	15
(Republic of Ireland) Hamilton	10	8

Final
(Republic of Ireland) Devlin	15	15
(England) Hume	4	1

==== Women's singles ====
Round of 16
(England) Marjorie Barrett	11	11
(England) H Ritchie	2	1
(Wales) B Neville	11	11
(England) W J Sainsbury	7	7
(England) Margaret Tragett	11	11
(England) C Dawson	7	8
(Scotland) J R Stewart	13	13	11
(Republic of Ireland) D Good	10	14	6
(England) F Waterhouse	11	7	11
(England) C Newitt	3	11	2
(Republic of Ireland) Dorothy Colpoys	11	11
(England) B M Emson	1	3
(England) Betty Uber	11	11
(England) L R Barton	8	5
(England) M E Emson	11	7	11
(England) G M Dutton	7	11	3

Quarterfinals
(England) Barrett	11	13
(Wales) Neville	3	10
(England) Tragett	11	11
(Scotland) Stewart	5	0
(England) Waterhouse	3	11	11
(Republic of Ireland) Colpoys	11	8	5
(England) Uber	11	11
(England) Emson	3	0

Semifinals
(England) Barrett	11	11
(England) Tragett	5	6
(England) Waterhouse	11	11
(England) Uber	1	7

Final
(England) Barrett	11	14
(England) Waterhouse	8	13
