= 1930 All England Badminton Championships =

Tournament information
- Sport: Badminton
- Location: Royal Horticultural Halls, Westminster, England, United Kingdom
- Dates: March 4–March 8, 1930
- Established: 1899
- Website: All England Championships

The 1930 All England Championships was a badminton tournament held at the Royal Horticultural Halls, Westminster, England from March 4 to March 8, 1930.

== Final results ==
Category	Winners	Runners-up	Score
Men's singles	(England) Donald Hume	(England) Alan Titherley	15–12, 15-12
Women's singles	(England) Marjorie Barrett	(England) Betty Uber	11–2, 5–11, 11-9
Men's doubles	(Republic of Ireland) Frank Devlin & Curly Mack	(England) Alan Titherley & Thomas P. Dick	15–5, 15-10
Women's doubles	(England) Marjorie Barrett & Violet Elton	(England) Marian Horsley & (Republic of Ireland) Dorothy Colpoys	15–1, 15-11
Mixed doubles	(England) Herbert Uber & Betty Uber	(England) B P Cook & C M Patten	18–13, 15-4

=== Results ===
==== Men's singles ====
Second round
(England) Donald Hume
(England) F W Percival	15	10	15
(Scotland) John William Alfred Bonar	9	15	8
(England) Ralph Nichols	15	15
(England) Thomas P. Dick	13	11
(England) W B Jones	15	18
(England) R Bracey-Forbes	5	14
(England) Alan Titherley	15	15
(England) H E Skeet	3	10
(England) Raymond White	15	15
(Scotland) F L Treasure	7	2
(Republic of Ireland) Frank Devlin
(England) James Seymour Wynn Tremenheere
(England) H E O'Brien	15	17
(England) C W Miller	8	15

Quarterfinals
(England) Hume	15	15
(England) Percival	8	2
(England) Nichols	15	15
(England) Jones	6	8
(England) Titherley	15	8	15
(England) White	5	15	9
(Republic of Ireland) Devlin	15	15
(England) O'Brien	8	1

Semifinals
(England) Hume	15	15
(England) Nichols	3	9
(England) Titherley	15	18
(Republic of Ireland) Devlin	10	16

Final
(England) Hume	15	15
(England) Titherley	12	12

==== Women's singles ====
Round of 16
(England) Marjorie Barrett	11	11
(England) F Waterhouse	6	5
(Republic of Ireland) D Good	11	11
(England) Burgess-Smith	7	6
(Republic of Ireland) Dorothy Colpoys	11	11
(England) J F Anning	7	7
(England) W Dearsley	5	11	11
(England) R L Barton	11	5	3
(England) Betty Uber	11	11
(Wales) B Neville	4	3
(England) Margaret Tragett	11	11
(England) C Newitt	8	2
(England) Nora Coop	8	11	11
(England) W J Sainsbury	11	5	3
(Scotland) J R Stewart	11	11
(England) M Sinclair	8	6

Quarterfinals
(England) Barrett	11	11
(Republic of Ireland) Good	0	0
(Republic of Ireland) Colpoys	11	11
(England) Dearsley	9	2
(England) Uber	11	11
(England) Tragett	5	5
(England) Coop	11	11
(Scotland) Stewart	6	6

Semifinals
(England) Barrett	11	11
(Republic of Ireland) Colpoys	7	0
(England) Uber	11	11
(England) Coop	7	2

Final
(England) Barrett	11	5	11
(England) Uber	2	11	9
