= 1936 All England Badminton Championships =

Tournament information
- Sport: Badminton
- Location: Royal Horticultural Halls, Westminster, England, United Kingdom
- Dates: March 2–March 7, 1936
- Established: 1899
- Website: All England Championships

The 1936 All England Championships was a badminton tournament held at the Royal Horticultural Halls, Westminster, England from March 2 to March 7, 1936.

== Final results ==
| Category | Winners | Runners-up | Score |
|---|---|---|---|
| Men's singles | (England) Ralph Nichols | (England) Raymond White | 18-16, 17-18, 15-10 |
| Women's singles | (England) Thelma Kingsbury | (England) Betty Uber | 5-11, 11-3, 11-2 |
| Men's doubles | (England) Ralph Nichols & Leslie Nichols | (England) Raymond White & Donald Hume | 15-7, 15-2 |
| Women's doubles | (England) Thelma Kingsbury & Marje Henderson | (England) Betty Uber & Diana Doveton | 15-10, 5-15, 15-7 |
| Mixed doubles | (England) Donald Hume & Betty Uber | (Republic of Ireland) Ian Maconachie & (England) Thelma Kingsbury | 18-15, 15-8 |

=== Results ===
==== Men's singles ====
Second round
(England) Ralph Nichols | 15 | 4 | 15
(Republic of Ireland) Thomas Boyle | 10 | 15 | 6
(England) Tom Wingfield | 15 | 11 | 15
(England) S C Minard | 7 | 15 | 7
(England) C H Whittaker | 15 | 15
(England) D N White | 6 | 11
(England) M Griffin | 15 | 15
(England) K L Mohta | 8 | 5
(England) Raymond White | 15 | 17
(England) Kenneth Wilson | 5 | 16
(England) D C Campbell | 15 | 15
(England) G E A Tautz | 9 | 3
(Malayan Union) Ong Hock Sim | 13 | 18 | 15
(England) H Morland | 15 | 14 | 5
(England) H E Baldwin | 15 | 15
(England) R D Champion | 4 | 2

Quarterfinals
(England) Nichols | 15 | 15
(England) Wingfield | 6 | 12
(England) Whittaker | 15 | 15
(England) Griffin | 9 | 7
(England) White | 15 | 15
(England) Campbell | 9 | 4
(Malayan Union) Ong | 13 | 15 | 15
(England) Baldwin | 18 | 13 | 9

Semifinals
(England) Nichols | 15 | 0 | 15
(England) Whittaker | 10 | 15 | 8
(England) White | 15 | 15
(Malayan Union) Ong | 7 | 12

Final
(England) Nichols | 18 | 17 | 15
(England) White | 16 | 18 | 10

==== Women's singles ====
Round of 16
(England) Thelma Kingsbury | 11 | 11
(England) C Haddon-Cave | 7 | 1
(England) V E Scott | 11 | 11
(England) I M Huggins | 0 | 0
(England) G Graham | 11 | 11
(England) J Elphicke | 2 | 0
(England) A King | 11 | 11
(England) G L Farrow | 1 | 4
(England) Betty Uber | 11 | 11
(England) Queenie Allen | 8 | 0
(England) K Ruston | w/o
(England) A Y Richardson
(England) Diana Doveton | 11 | 11
(England) E Butler | 0 | 0
(England) Daphne Young | 11 | 11 | 11
(England) C D Newitt | 7 | 13 | 3

Quarterfinals
(England) Kingsbury | 11 | 11
(England) Scott | 5 | 4
(England) Graham | 11 | 11
(England) King | 0 | 2
(England) Uber | 11 | 11
(England) Ruston | 1 | 1
(England) Doveton | 11 | 11
(England) Young | 7 | 6

Semifinals
(England) Kingsbury | 11 | 11 | 11
(England) Graham | 13 | 3 | 1
(England) Uber | 11 | 14
(England) Doveton | 2 | 9

Final
(England) Kingsbury | 5 | 11 | 11
(England) Uber | 11 | 3 | 2
