= Reginald Fulljames =

English cricketer and military officer

- Born: 13 November 1896; Southsea, Hampshire
- Died: 31 July 1985 (aged 88); Curdridge, Hampshire
- Burial place: St Peter's Church, Curdridge
- Military career
- Allegiance: United Kingdom
- Branch: Royal Flying Corps; Royal Air Force
- Service years: 1915–1945
- Rank: Group captain
- Conflicts: First World War; Second World War
- Awards: Military Cross

Reginald Fulljames
Cricket information
- Batting: Left-handed
- Bowling: Slow left-arm orthodox

Career statistics
Competition	First-class
Matches	8
Runs scored	173
Batting average	14.41
100s/50s	–/–
Top score	47
Balls bowled	1,659
Wickets	38
Bowling average	20.92
5 wickets in innings	5
10 wickets in match	1
Best bowling	7/25
Catches/stumpings	7/–
- Source: Cricinfo, 22 September 2018

Reginald Edgar Gilbert Fulljames MC (13 November 1896 – 31 July 1985) was an English cricketer and an officer in both the Royal Flying Corps (RFC) and the Royal Air Force (RAF), serving in both world wars.

== Life and military service ==
Born at Southsea, Hampshire in November 1896 to pawnbroker Gilbert Fulljames and Edith Marianne (née Totterdell), daughter of a Portsmouth corset manufacturer he was educated at Sutton Valence School, before attending Downing College, Cambridge. He served during World War I and learnt to fly in 1916, before serving with the Royal Flying Corps in France in 1917 with the rank of second lieutenant. He was shot down three times during the course of the war, including once by the infamous German flying ace Baron von Richthofen. The Royal Flying Corps was merged into the Royal Air Force in April 1918, with Fulljames also transferring to the new service. For his services as a pilot during the war he was awarded the Military Cross.

He became a flying instructor in 1918, and following the war he was granted the rank of flight lieutenant in 1919. With the war having interrupted his studies, he completed his engineering course at Downing College in 1922. He served as member of the technical staff at RAF headquarters in British India from 1923 to 1926, including as chief technical officer at RAF Drigh Road in Karachi. He made his debut in first-class cricket for the Royal Air Force cricket team against the Royal Navy at The Oval in 1927. He was promoted from flight lieutenant to squadron leader in December 1928, while serving at The School of Technical Training at RAF Halton. His first-class appearances for the RAF continued in 1928, with Fulljames playing first-class cricket for the RAF until 1932, making eight appearances. A successful bowler for the RAF, he would take a total of 38 wickets at a good bowling average of 20.92. He twice took five wickets in an innings and once took ten wickets in a match, with best innings bowling figures of 7/25. His haul of 38 wickets would eventually make him the RAF's leading wicket-taker in first-class cricket.

By July 1935, Fulljames had been promoted from squadron leader to Wing Commander. He served during World War II, during which he achieved the rank of Wing Commander in March 1940. By 1945, he held the rank of temporary group captain. He retired from active service in May 1945, retaining the now permanent rank of group captain. Shortly after retiring from the RAF, he stood as the Liberal Party candidate for Southampton in the 1945 General Election. He died at Curdridge, Hampshire, on 31 July 1985. He was survived by his wife, Annie Muriel Fulljames, with whom he had two children.

== See also ==
- List of Royal Air Force first-class cricketers
