= Hugh Sells =

English cricketer and Royal Air Force officer

Personal information
- Full name: Hugh Michael Sells
- Born: 23 March 1922; Westcliff-on-Sea, Essex, England
- Died: 17 January 1978 (aged 55); Chelsea, London, England
- Batting: Left-handed

Career statistics
Competition	First-class
Matches	1
Runs scored	46
Batting average	23.00
100s/50s	–/–
Top score	26
Catches/stumpings	1/–
- Source: Cricinfo, 21 March 2019

Hugh Michael Sells (23 March 1922 – 17 January 1978) was an English first-class cricketer and Royal Air Force officer.

Sells was born in Westcliff-on-Sea and was educated at Malvern College. He was commissioned into the Royal Air Force Volunteer Reserve as a pilot officer in November 1943. He was promoted to the war substantive rank of flying officer in June 1944. Shortly after the conclusion of the war, he was promoted to the war substantive rank of flight lieutenant in November 1945. He played first-class cricket for the Royal Air Force cricket team against Worcestershire at Worcester in 1946. Batting twice in the match as an opening batsman, he was dismissed for 26 runs in the Royal Air Force first-innings by Roly Jenkins, while in their second-innings, he was dismissed for 20 runs by Leonard Oakley.

After the leaving the Royal Air Force, he later worked as a field manager for British Oxygen Gases. Sells died at Chelsea in January 1978.
