= Bessie Staples =

English badminton player

Personal information
- Born: c.1915
- Died: unknown

Sport
- Country: England
- Sport: Badminton
Medal record
Representing England
All England Open Badminton Championships
Gold medal – first place	1939 London	mixed

Bessie M Staples married name Bessie Shearlaw (c.1915-date of death unknown), was a female England badminton international.

== Badminton career ==
Staples was a winner of the All England Open Badminton Championships. She won the mixed doubles in the 1939 All England Badminton Championships with Ralph Nichols. Staples also won a Denmark Open title with Nichols.

After marrying James Shearlaw in 1945 she competed in her married name and won the Irish Open, Scottish Open and the Scottish Individual Championships.

== Achievements ==
=== International tournaments (5 titles, 2 runners-up) ===
Women's doubles
Year	Tournament	Partner	Opponent	Score	Result
1939	Denmark Open	(England) Diana Doveton	(England) Queenie Allen (Denmark) Ruth Dalsgaard	15–12, 10–15, 11–15	(silver) Runner-up
1947	Scottish Open	(Scotland) C. B. Alison	(Scotland) Elizabeth Armstrong (Scotland) E. W. Greenwood	15–8, 15–10	(gold) Winner

Mixed doubles
Year	Tournament	Partner	Opponent	Score	Result
1938	All England Open	(England) Ralph Nichols	(England) Raymond M. White (England) Betty Uber	10–15, 9–15	(silver) Runner-up
1939	All England Open	(England) Ralph Nichols	(Republic of Ireland) James Rankin (Republic of Ireland) Mavis Macnaughton	15–10, 6–15, 15–8	(gold) Winner
1939	Denmark Open	(England) Ralph Nichols	(England) Raymond M. White (England) Diana Doveton	17–14, 15–7	(gold) Winner
1947	Scottish Open	(England) Ralph Nichols	(Scotland) J. S. Millar (Scotland) Elizabeth Armstrong	15–7, 15–5	(gold) Winner
1947	Irish Open	(England) Ralph Nichols	(Republic of Ireland) Thomas Boyle (Republic of Ireland) W. Swann	15–8, 15–3	(gold) Winner
