= Boumphrey =

Boumphrey is a surname. Notable people with the name include

- Colin Boumphrey (1897–1945), English cricketer
- Donald Boumphrey (1892–1971), English cricketer
- Peter Boumphrey (1919–2004), British alpine skier
- Pauline Boumphrey (1886–1959), American sculptor
