= Thomas Thornton =

Thomas or Tom Thornton may refer to:

== Clergymen ==
- Thomas Thornton (academic administrator) (c. 1541–1629), English Church of England clergyman and academic administrator
- Thomas C. Thornton (1794–1860), American Methodist minister and educator

== Public officials ==
- Thomas de Thornton, English MP for Lancashire in 1313, 1320 and 1328
- Thomas Thornton (merchant) (1762–1814), English trade consul and writer on Turkey
- Thomas Thornton (politician) (1831–1897), American member of Wisconsin State Assembly
- Thomas Henry Thornton (1832–1913), English Indian civil servant, judge and author
- Thomas Patrick Thornton (1898–1985), American federal judge

== Sportsmen ==
- Thomas Thornton (sportsman, died 1823) (1751/2–1823), English huntsman and falconer
- Tom Thornton (footballer) (1885–1951), English footballer
- Thomas Thornton (cricketer) (1922–1987), English right-handed batsman
- Tom Thornton (cricketer) (born 1989), Australian right-handed batsman
