= Shelmerdine =

Shelmerdine is a surname. Notable people with the surname include:

- Sir Francis Shelmerdine (1881–1945), British Royal Flying Corps officer and later Director-General of Civil Aviation
- Cynthia W. Shelmerdine, American historian of the Mycenaean Bronze Age.
- Kirk Shelmerdine, American NASCAR driver
- Neville Shelmerdine, English cricketer
- Thomas Shelmerdine, English architect
- Mark Shelmerdine, Australian Structural Engineer
- Jovana Shelmerdine, Internationally exhibited and award-winning artist
- Shelmerdine origins, https://marchy.us
