= Cyril Adams =

English cricketer and Royal Air Force officer

- Born: 18 September 1897; Parkstone, Dorset
- Died: 19 August 1988 (aged 90); Milford on Sea, Hampshire
- Military career
- Allegiance: United Kingdom
- Branch: British Army; Royal Air Force
- Service years: 1915–1949
- Rank: Air commodore
- Commands: No. 15 Squadron RAF; No. 38 Squadron RAF; RAF Kemble; RAF Oakington; RAF Abingdon; RAF Santa Cruz
- Conflicts: World War I World War II
- Awards: Companion of the Order of the Bath; Commander of Order of the British Empire

Cyril Adams
Cricket information
- Batting: Right-handed
- Bowling: Right-arm fast

Domestic team information
- Years: Team
- 1922–1928: Dorset

Career statistics
Competition	First-class
Matches	5
Runs scored	173
Batting average	19.22
100s/50s	–/–
Top score	46*
Balls bowled	646
Wickets	11
Bowling average	33.90
5 wickets in innings	–
10 wickets in match	–
Best bowling	3/62
Catches/stumpings	4/–
- Source: Cricinfo, 21 September 2018

Cyril Douglas Adams CB, CBE (18 September 1897 – 19 August 1988) was an English cricketer and Royal Air Force (RAF) officer. Serving first as a soldier in the First World War, Adams joined the newly formed RAF in 1918, serving in the RAF for over 25 years. His career as a first-class cricketer with the Royal Air Force cricket team ran from 1928–1932, prior to that he had represented his native Dorset at minor counties level.

== Early life, WWI and inter-war years ==
Adams was born to Blanche Annie Adams and Lionel Lincoln Adams at Parkstone, Dorset. He was educated at Parkstone Grammar School. Having served from 1915 in the British Army during World War I, Adams joined the newly formed Royal Air Force in July 1918 as a second lieutenant in the General Duties Branch. After the war, he gained the rank of probationary pilot officer in August 1919, with promotion to flying officer coming the following month.

In 1922, Adams began playing minor counties cricket for Dorset. He played for Dorset in the Minor Counties Championship on 21 occasions from 1922–1928. Adams' minor counties career was intermittent due to his RAF service, which saw him overseas serving in Iraq Command in 1925. In January 1927, Adams achieved the rank of flight lieutenant. He made his debut in first-class cricket for the Royal Air Force against the Royal Navy at The Oval in 1928, making five first-class appearances for the Royal Air Force from 1928–1932. He totalled 173 runs and 11 wickets across his five match first-class career.

By 1936, Adams was the commanding officer of No. 15 Squadron, having achieved the rank of squadron leader at some point prior to 1936. In 1938, he was serving at Bomber Command, with promotion to wing commander coming in January of the following year, whereupon he was placed in position as commanding officer of No. 38 Squadron in February 1939.

== WWII and post-war ==
With the onset of World War II, No. 38 Squadron became part of No. 3 Group RAF. Adams obtained the rank of acting group captain in 1940, a rank he would retain for the remainder of the war. He held several commands during the war, including RAF Kemble, RAF Oakington, RAF Abingdon, RAF Marston Moor, and RAF North Luffenham. In November 1941, Adams was commended for bravery when a plane crashed on the airfield he was serving in. Circling the airfield in his car at the time, Adams arrived first on the scene and proceeded to enter the burning plane, rescuing a seriously injured airman aboard and recovering the body of another. As a result, he was awarded an OBE for gallantry. In July 1945, with the war in Europe over, Adams was transferred to British India, where he commanded RAF Santa Cruz in Bombay until 1946, by which time he had achieved the rank of acting air commodore.

He was made a Companion of the Order of the Bath in the 1948 New Year Honours. He achieved the full rank of air commodore on 16 November 1949, retiring from the RAF the next day. He died at Milford on Sea, Hampshire, on 19 August 1988. Beyond playing cricket for the RAF, he also represented it in rugby union and athletics. He married three times during his life, with his first marriage producing two children.
