= Morton Shapcott =

English cricketer and Royal Air Force officer

Personal information
- Full name: Morton Swan Shapcott
- Born: 27 September 1901; Camberwell, Surrey, England
- Died: 15 April 1977 (aged 75); St Pancras, London, England
- Batting: Right-handed

Career statistics
| Competition | First-class |
|---|---|
| Matches | 4 |
| Runs scored | 246 |
| Batting average | 35.14 |
| 100s/50s | –/2 |
| Top score | 68 |
| Catches/stumpings | 2/– |
- Source: Cricinfo, 21 March 2019

Morton Swan Shapcott CBE (20 September 1901 – 15 April 1977) was an English first-class cricketer and Royal Air Force officer. Enlisting in the Royal Air Force in 1926, Shapcott served in the Stores Branch for over thirty years, serving during the Second World War and reaching the rank of air commodore. He also played first-class cricket for the Royal Air Force cricket team from 1927–32.

== Life and military career ==
The son of Thomas William Shapcott and his wife, Annie Swan, he was born at Camberwell. Shapcott enlisted in the Royal Air Force as a pilot officer in the Stores Branch RAF Cranwell in October 1926, with confirmation in the rank and promotion to flying officer coming in October 1927. He made his debut in first-class cricket for the Royal Air Force cricket team against the Royal Navy at The Oval in 1927. He played first-class cricket for the Royal Air Force until 1932, making four appearances. He scored a total of 246 runs at an average of 35.14, with a highest score of 68. He was based in British India in 1929, serving as a stores officer at an aircraft depot. He was promoted to the rank of flight lieutenant in April 1934, when based at RAF Boscombe Down. He attended the RAF Staff College in January 1936. He married Freda Beatrice Johnson in 1936, with the couple having four children. He was promoted to the rank of squadron leader in October 1938.

Serving during the Second World War, he was promoted to the temporary rank of wing commander in June 1940, with Shapcott gaining the full war substantive rank in October 1943. He was promoted to the rank of group captain in January 1944. He was mentioned in dispatches in June 1944 and again in January 1945. Shapcott received the Legion of Merit from the United States in October 1945. He was commanding a maintenance unit at RAF Burtonwood in 1947, and was director of movements in 1950. He was the air officer commanding 206 Group in the Middle East from 1952–54. He was promoted to the rank of air commodore in January 1953. He was the director of equipment at the Air Ministry from December 1954. He was made a CBE in the 1955 New Year Honours. He retired from active service in January 1958, retaining the rank of air commodore.

He died at St Pancras in April 1977. His was survived by his wife, who died in 1995.
