= Holford White =

English cricketer and Royal Air Force officer

George Holford White
- Born: 16 October 1904; Dorchester, Dorset, England
- Died: 18 January 1965 (aged 60); Uxbridge, Middlesex, England
- Military career
- Allegiance: United Kingdom
- Branch: Royal Air Force
- Service years: 1927–1965
- Rank: Air Vice-Marshall
- Commands: RAF Record Office
- Conflicts: Second World War
- Awards: OBE, CBE, CB
- Cricket career

Cricket information
- Batting: Right-handed

Domestic team information
- Years: Team
- 1927–1935: Dorset

Career statistics
Competition	First-class
Matches	1
Runs scored	50
Batting average	25.00
100s/50s	–/–
Top score	25
Catches/stumpings	–/–
- Source: Cricinfo, 3 October 2018

George Holford White CBE, CB (16 October 1904 – 18 January 1965) was an English first-class cricketer and Royal Air Force (RAF) officer.

== Early life and cricket ==
White was born at Dorchester, and educated at Felsted School. After leaving Felsted, White qualified as an accountant. He made his debut in minor counties cricket for Dorset against Wiltshire at Salisbury in 1927. He joined the Royal Air Force in the same year, enlisting with the rank of Pilot officer on probation in the Accountant Branch. His probationary period ended in January 1929 when he was promoted to Flying officer. He was posted to abroad to RAF Iraq Command in 1930.

White made his only appearance in first-class cricket in 1932, when he played for the Royal Air Force cricket team against the Army at The Oval, scoring 25 runs in both his batting innings'. In December 1934, White was promoted to the rank of Flight lieutenant. Having played intermittently for Dorset since his debut in 1927, White played his final minor counties match in 1935, having made a total of 19 appearances in the Minor Counties Championship.

== World War II and later life ==
During the course of World War II, White was promoted to the temporary rank of Squadron leader in June 1940, achieving the rank permanently in November 1942. White was posted to RAF Command in British India in June 1942.

Following the war, he was made an OBE in the King's 1946 Birthday Honours, by which point he held the rank of Acting Group Captain, achieving the rank permanently in July 1948. He was made a CBE in the Queen's 1957 Birthday Honours, by which point he held the rank of Air commodore. He commanded the RAF Record Office in 1960, and in October 1961, he became an Air vice-marshall with the Technical Training Command. He was made a Companion of The Most Honourable Order of the Bath in the Queen's 1962 Birthday Honours. He died at Uxbridge in January 1965.
