= Donald Boumphrey =

English cricketer, educator, and British Army officer

Personal information
- Full name: Donald Boumphrey
- Born: 4 October 1892; Birkenhead, Cheshire, England
- Died: 12 September 1971 (aged 78); Aughton, Lancashire, England
- Relatives: Colin Boumphrey (brother)

Domestic team information
- Years: Team
- 1928: Wales
- 1914–1933: Cheshire

Career statistics
Competition	First-class
Matches	1
Runs scored	10
Batting average	5.00
100s/50s	0/0
Top score	6
Catches/stumpings	0/–
- Source: Cricinfo, 12 April 2011

Donald Boumphrey MC (4 October 1892 – 12 September 1971) was an English cricketer, educator and British Army officer. As a cricketer, his batting and bowling styles are unknown, though, from his rehearsing in old age the feats he had performed as a young man, he was a right-handed batsman and a finger-spin bowler.

Born in Birkenhead, Cheshire to Edwin Joseph Boumphrey and his wife Mary, he was christened in Wallasey, Cheshire on 13 November 1892. He was educated at Shrewsbury School, where he represented the school cricket team.

Boumphrey made his debut for Cheshire in the 1914 Minor Counties Championship against Northumberland. Boumphrey played Minor counties cricket for Cheshire from 1914 to 1933, which included 41 Minor Counties Championship matches In 1928, he played his only first-class match representing Wales against the touring West Indians. In this match he opened the batting for Wales, scoring 6 runs in the Welsh first-innings before being dismissed by George Francis and in their second-innings he scored 4 runs, before being dismissed by Learie Constantine.

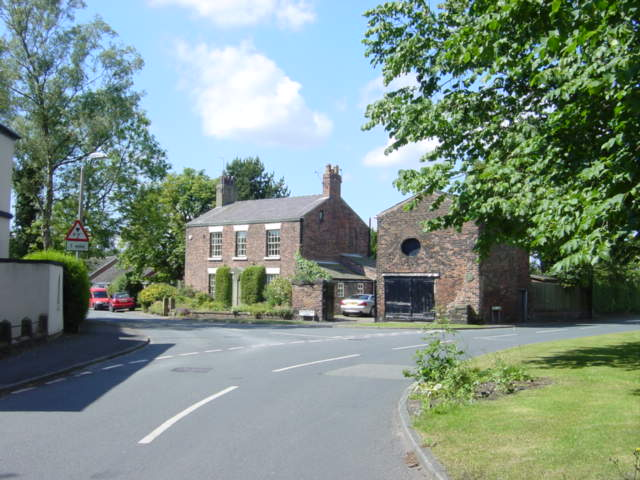
Holt Green House, Boumphrey's place of death

He served in the British Army during the First World War and was mentioned in dispatches in The London Gazette. One such mention confirmed his awarding of the Military Cross in 1917, at which time he held the rank of Temporary Lieutenant in the Machine Gun Corps. Following the war he began teaching and coaching cricket and rugby at Rydal School, now Rydal Penrhos school, an association which was to last for forty years. With the onset of the Second World War, he was mentioned in dispatches in the London Gazette in 1943, having been granted the rank of 2nd Lieutenant for his service with the Army Cadet Force. He was based in Caernarfonshire at the time. His father died on 6 May 1941, with mention being made in the London Gazette of Boumphrey being the executor of his late father's estate, including property in Fareham, Hampshire.

After retiring from teaching, he remained at Rydal School as long as his physique permitted. He coached cricket, rugby and Eton Fives, and instructed generations of pupils in the craft of letterpress printing.

His brother, Colin, who played a single first-class match for the Royal Air Force died in 1945. Following his death, Boumphrey inherited his brother's home in Aughton, Lancashire. It was in that house that Boumphrey died on 12 September 1971.
