= Colin Boumphrey =

English cricketer and military officer

- Born: 27 January 1897; Liverpool, Lancashire
- Died: 1 February 1945 (aged 48); Aughton, Lancashire
- Relatives: Donald Boumphrey (brother)
- Military career
- Allegiance: United Kingdom
- Branch: Royal Naval Air Service; Royal Air Force
- Service years: 1917–1939
- Rank: Squadron leader
- Conflicts: First World War; Russian Civil War
- Awards: Distinguished Flying Cross

Colin Boumphrey
Cricket information
- Batting: Right-handed

Domestic team information
- Years: Team
- 1920–1926: Cheshire

Career statistics
Competition	First-class
Matches	1
Runs scored	31
Batting average	15.50
100s/50s	–/–
Top score	31
Balls bowled	–
Wickets	–
Bowling average	–
5 wickets in innings	–
10 wickets in match	–
Best bowling	–
Catches/stumpings	–/–
- Source: Cricinfo, 28 September 2018

Colin Boumphrey DFC (27 January 1897 – 1 February 1945) was an English cricketer and an officer in both the Royal Naval Air Service (RNAS) and the Royal Air Force (RAF).

== Biography ==
Boumphrey was born at Liverpool, and was educated at Shrewsbury School, where his older brother Donald had also been educated. During the First World War, Boumphrey initially served with the RNAS, holding the rank of Flight Sub-Lieutenant in March 1917. By October of that year he had gained the temporary rank of Flight lieutenant. Following the end of the war and now serving within the RAF, Boumphrey flew during the Russian Civil War, where he was mentioned in dispatches. He took part in Operation Kronstadt in August 1919, as part of the British campaign in the Baltic. He was awarded the Distinguished Flying Cross in July 1920, for gallantry while serving in the Baltic.

Boumphrey returned from the Russian Civil War in 1920. He played a single minor counties cricket match for Cheshire in August 1920, against Northumberland. Retained with the RAF's General Duties Branch, Boumphrey was granted the rank of Flight lieutenant permanently in May 1924. He played two further minor counties fixtures for Cheshire in the 1926 Minor Counties Championship, which marked his final appearances for the county in minor counties cricket. He was promoted to the rank of Squadron leader in July 1929. Boumphrey made his only appearance in first-class cricket in June 1932, when he played for the Royal Air Force cricket team against the British Army at The Oval. He scored 31 runs in the RAF's first-innings, before being dismissed bowled by John Walford; in the RAF second-innings he was dismissed without scoring by the same bowler. He retired from the RAF in July 1939, on account of "ill health". He died at Aughton, near Ormskirk on 1 February 1945.

== See also ==
- List of Royal Air Force first-class cricketers
