= Roy Scoggins =

English cricketer and Royal Air Force officer

Personal information
- Full name: Roy Scoggins
- Born: 13 March 1908; West Ham, Essex, England
- Died: 19 January 1970 (aged 61); Middleton-on-Sea, Sussex, England

Domestic team information
- Years: Team
- 1933: Buckinghamshire
- 1932: Royal Air Force

Career statistics
Competition	First-class
Matches	1
Runs scored	1
Batting average	0.50
100s/50s	–/–
Top score	1
Balls bowled	172
Wickets	5
Bowling average	22.40
5 wickets in innings	–
10 wickets in match	–
Best bowling	5/112
Catches/stumpings	–/–
- Source: Cricinfo, 26 May 2011

Air Vice-Marshal Roy Scoggins CB, CBE, QHDS, LDSRCS, (13 March 1908 – 19 January 1970) was a Royal Air Force officer and English cricketer. He was born in West Ham, Essex and educated at Sir George Monoux Grammar School.

Scoggins made his only first-class appearance for the Royal Air Force against the Army. In the Army first-innings, he took 5 wickets for the cost of 112 runs from 28.4 overs. With the bat, he scored a single run in the Royal Air Force first-innings, before being dismissed by Arnold Minnis. In their second-innings, he was dismissed for a duck by the same bowler. Despite his 5 wickets in the Army first-innings, the Royal Air Force lost the match by an innings and 130 runs. His batting and bowling styles are unknown.

Scoggins made his debut for Buckinghamshire in the 1933 Minor Counties Championship, playing just 2 matches against Bedfordshire and Hertfordshire.

Scoggins served in the Second World War within the Royal Air Force with the Dental Branch. In January 1941, he was promoted from flight lieutenant to squadron leader. He was awarded an MBE in 1953. Scoggins eventually rose to the rank of Air Vice-Marshal, having also been appointed Honorary Dental Surgeon to The Queen. It was in the dentistry capacity that he acted as Director of RAF Dental Services from 1958–1964. He was appointed to the Order of the Bath in the 1964 New Year Honours. Scoggins died in Middleton-on-Sea, Sussex on 19 January 1970.
