= William Faulkner (cricketer) =

English cricketer (born 1923)

Personal information
- Full name: William George Faulkner
- Born: 5 May 1923; Bromley-by-Bow, London, England
- Batting: Right-handed
- Bowling: Right-arm fast-medium

Career statistics
| Competition | First-class |
|---|---|
| Matches | 1 |
| Runs scored | 23 |
| Batting average | 11.50 |
| 100s/50s | –/– |
| Top score | 18 |
| Balls bowled | 144 |
| Wickets | 0 |
| Bowling average | – |
| 5 wickets in innings | – |
| 10 wickets in match | – |
| Best bowling | – |
| Catches/stumpings | 1/– |
- Source: Cricinfo, 20 March 2019

William George Faulkner (born 5 May 1923) is an English former first-class cricketer.

While serving in the Royal Air Force, Faulkner made a single appearance in first-class cricket for the Royal Air Force against Worcestershire at Worcester in 1946.

Batting twice in that match, he was dismissed for 5 runs by Peter Jackson in the Royal Air Force first-innings, while in their second-innings he was dismissed by Leonard Blunt for 18 runs. With his right-arm fast-medium bowling, he bowled 24 wicketless overs.
