= Dorothy Walton =

Canadian badminton player (1909–1981)

Personal information
- Full name: Dorothy Louise Walton
- Born: 7 August 1909 Swift Current, Saskatchewan
- Died: 17 October 1981 (aged 72) Toronto, Ontario

Sport
- Country: Canada
- Sport: Badminton

Achievements and titles
- World finals: All England Open Badminton Championships (1939)

Dorothy Louise Walton, CM, née McKenzie (7 August 1909 – 17 October 1981) was a Canadian badminton player who is the only Canadian ever to win the All England Open Badminton Championships, winning the Women's Singles in 1939.

Born in Swift Current, Saskatchewan, she was a founding member of the Consumers' Association of Canada and was its president from 1950 to 1953.

In 1973, she was made a Member of the Order of Canada, Canada's highest civilian honour. In 1961, she was inducted into Canada's Sports Hall of Fame. In 1966, she was inducted into the Saskatchewan Sports Hall of Fame. In 1971, she was inducted into the Canadian Olympic Hall of Fame.

== Achievement ==
=== International tournament (1 title) ===
Women's doubles
Year	Tournament	Opponent	Score	Result
1939	All England Open	(England) Diana Doveton	11–4, 11–5	(gold) Winner
