= Norman Gavin =

English cricketer and Royal Air Force officer

Personal information
- Full name: Norman Leslie Gavin
- Born: 5 September 1922; Camberwell, Surrey, England
- Died: 18 February 2013 (aged 90)
- Batting: Left-handed
- Bowling: Slow left-arm orthodox

Career statistics
| Competition | First-class |
|---|---|
| Matches | 1 |
| Runs scored | 52 |
| Batting average | 52.00 |
| 100s/50s | –/– |
| Top score | 29 |
| Balls bowled | 204 |
| Wickets | 3 |
| Bowling average | 34.00 |
| 5 wickets in innings | – |
| 10 wickets in match | – |
| Best bowling | 3/76 |
| Catches/stumpings | 1/– |
- Source: Cricinfo, 6 October 2018

Norman Leslie Gavin (15 September 1922 – 18 February 2013) was an English first-class cricketer and Royal Air Force (RAF) officer.

Gavin made one appearance in first-class cricket in 1946 for the Royal Air Force cricket team against Worcestershire at Worcester. He took three wickets with his slow left-arm orthodox and scored 52 runs. He played for the Kent Second XI in the Minor Counties Championship from 1947–1949.
