= Thomas Thornton (cricketer) =

English RAF airman and cricketer (1922–1987)

Personal information
- Full name: Thomas Thornton
- Born: 22 May 1922; Elland, West Riding of Yorkshire, England
- Died: 1 February 1987 (aged 64); Elland, West Yorkshire, England
- Batting: Right-handed

Career statistics
Competition	First-class
Matches	1
Runs scored	29
Batting average	14.50
100s/50s	0/0
Top score	23
Catches/stumpings	0/–
- Source: Cricinfo, 21 March 2019

Thomas Thornton (22 May 1922 – 1 February 1987) was an English first-class cricketer.

While serving in the Royal Air Force, Thornton made a single appearance in first-class cricket for the Royal Air Force against Worcestershire at Worcester in 1946. He was dismissed for 6 runs by Leonard Blunt in the first innings, while in the second innings he was dismissed by Leonard Oakley for 23. He also played second eleven cricket for Yorkshire in 1939 and 1946.

Thornton died from stomach cancer in Elland on 1 February 1987, at the age of 64.
