= Tom Pollitt =

English cricketer and Royal Air Force officer

Personal information
- Full name: Tom Urquhart Pollitt
- Born: 14 July 1900; Farnham, Surrey, England
- Died: 13 August 1979 (aged 79); Ely, Cambridgeshire, England
- Batting: Left-handed

Career statistics
Competition	First-class
Matches	1
Runs scored	20
Batting average	10.00
100s/50s	–/–
Top score	14
Catches/stumpings	–/–
- Source: Cricinfo, 21 March 2019

Tom Urquhart Pollitt OBE (14 July 1900 – 13 August 1979) was an English first-class cricketer and Royal Air Force officer. Initially a non-commissioned officer when he joined the Royal Air Force, he later served as a commissioned officer during the Second World War. He also played first-class cricket for the Royal Air Force cricket team.

== Life and military career ==
Pollitt enlisted in the Royal Air Force as a non-commissioned officer prior to 1931. He played first-class cricket for the Royal Air Force cricket team against the Army at The Oval in 1931. Batting twice in the match as an opening batsman, he was dismissed for 6 runs in the Royal Air Force first-innings by Adrian Gore, while in their second-innings he was dismissed for 14 runs by the same bowler.

Shortly before the outbreak of the Second World War, Pollitt was made a commissioned officer when he was promoted from warrant officer to flying officer in June 1939. In August 1940, he was granted the war substantive rank of flight lieutenant. He was mentioned in dispatches twice in 1941, in January and March. He was made an OBE in the 1942 Birthday Honours. He was mentioned in dispatches in June 1943, and then in the same month he was promoted to the war substantive rank of squadron leader, antedated to July 1942. He was promoted to the temporary rank of wing commander in July 1944. A year after the conclusion of the war, he was promoted to the full rank of squadron leader. He was granted seniority in the rank of squadron leader back to June 1945. He was promoted to the full rank of wing commander in July 1947, with seniority to October 1946. He retired from active service in April 1955, retaining the rank of wing commander.

He died at Ely in August 1979.
