= Alan Titherley =

English badminton player

Personal information
- Born: 1903
- Died: 1963 (aged 59–60)

Sport
- Country: England
- Sport: Badminton

Alan Titherley was an English badminton player. Born in 1903 he started to play badminton in the early 1920s and was soon selected by Cheshire. He was capped by England in the 1931/2 season and made 19 international appearances, the last in 1946/7. He competed in the All England Championships reaching three finals. He later won the All England Veterans doubles three times retiring unbeaten from the event in 1954. He died on 24 June 1963 at his home in Wallasey.

== Achievements ==
=== International tournaments (3 titles, 13 runners-up) ===
Men's singles
Year	Tournament	Opponent	Score	Result
1927	Welsh International	(Republic of Ireland) John McCallum	11–15, 15–10, 15–12	(gold) Winner
1930	All England Open	(England) Donald C. Hume	12–15, 12–15	(silver) Runner-up
1933	Scottish Open	(England) Donald C. Hume	6–15, 8–15	(silver) Runner-up
1934	Irish Open	(England) Raymond M. White	17–14, 12–15, 7–15	(silver) Runner-up

Men's doubles
Year	Tournament	Partner	Opponent	Score	Result
1927	Welsh International	(Republic of Ireland) John McCallum	(Scotland) F. L. Treasure (England) F. B. Malthouse	15–3, 15–5	(gold) Winner
1929	All England Open	(England) Thomas Pattinson Dick	(Republic of Ireland) Frank Devlin (Republic of Ireland) Gordon Mack	2–15, 3–15	(silver) Runner-up
1930	All England Open	(England) Thomas Pattinson Dick	(Republic of Ireland) Frank Devlin (Republic of Ireland) Gordon Mack	5–15, 10–15	(silver) Runner-up
1933	Welsh International	(England) J. R. Davidson	(England) Donald C. Hume (England) Raymond M. White	4–15, 4–15	(silver) Runner-up
1935	Scottish Open	(England) Kenneth Davidson	(England) Donald C. Hume (England) Raymond M. White	10–15, 7–15	(silver) Runner-up
1935	French Open	(Scotland) F. L. Treasure	(England) Ralph Nichols (England) Geoffrey J. Fish	2–15, 18–15, 9–15	(silver) Runner-up
1936	Irish Open	(England) Thomas Pattinson Dick	(Republic of Ireland) Ian Maconachie (Republic of Ireland) James Rankin	7–15, 12–15	(silver) Runner-up
1938	Irish Open	(England) Kenneth L. Wilson	(Republic of Ireland) J. W. McGarry (Republic of Ireland) M. McGarry	15–7, 15–7	(gold) Winner
1939	Scottish Open	(England) Raymond M. White	(Republic of Ireland) Thomas Boyle (Republic of Ireland) J. W. McGarry	9–15, 12–15	(silver) Runner-up

Mixed doubles
Year	Tournament	Partner	Opponent	Score	Result
1933	Scottish Open	(Scotland) C. T. Duncan	(England) Donald C. Hume (England) Betty Uber	8–15, 8–15	(silver) Runner-up
1938	Welsh International	(England) Betty Uber	(Republic of Ireland) Thomas Boyle (Republic of Ireland) Olive Wilson	5–15, 10–15	(silver) Runner-up
1938	Irish Open	(Republic of Ireland) Norma Stoker	(Republic of Ireland) Thomas Boyle (Republic of Ireland) Olive Wilson	15–14, 12–15, 6–15	(silver) Runner-up
