= Stanley Amor =

English cricketer

Personal information
- Full name: Stanley Long Amor
- Born: 22 July 1887; Bath, Somerset, England
- Died: 7 August 1965 (aged 78); Bath, Somerset, England
- Batting: Right-handed
- Role: Wicketkeeper

Domestic team information
- Years: Team
- 1908–1930: Somerset
- FC debut: 11 May 1908 Somerset v Lancashire
- Last FC: 11 July 1930 Somerset v Yorkshire

Career statistics
Competition	First-class
Matches	29
Runs scored	220
Batting average	7.09
100s/50s	0/0
Top score	21
Catches/stumpings	27/24
- Source: CricketArchive, 9 August 2008

Stanley Long Amor (22 July 1887 – 7 August 1965) was an English first-class cricket for Somerset irregularly for a period of more than 20 years.

A tail-end batsman and wicketkeeper, Amor played exactly half of his 26 first-class matches for Somerset in games at Bath, and his first-class career never took him further north than Worcester, though that visit brought him his highest first-class score of 21.

Primarily, Amor was a club cricketer, acting as captain and wicketkeeper for Bath Cricket Club from 1914 to 1950, and president and chairman after that. That he might have made the grade at a higher level of cricket is suggested by the fact that, in the 1922 and 1923 seasons, he figured in late-season festival cricket at Eastbourne and Hastings, playing for South v North, for the Royal Air Force (Ex-Service) side against the Rest of England, and for The Rest against Lord Cowdray's XI, alongside notable cricketing names such as Jack Hobbs, Frank Woolley, Percy Fender and the Gilligans.

He was awarded the OBE.
