= Neville Shelmerdine =

English cricketer

Personal information
- Full name: Neville Shelmerdine
- Born: 23 December 1909; Manchester, England
- Died: 2 September 1992 (aged 82); Manchester, England
- Batting: Right-handed
- Bowling: Right-arm medium, off break

Domestic team information
- Years: Team
- 1945: Royal Air Force
- Only First-class: 29 August 1945 Royal Air Force v Yorkshire

Career statistics
Competition	First-class
Matches	1
Runs scored	–
Batting average	–
100s/50s	–/–
Top score	–
Catches/stumpings	0/–
- Source: CricketArchive, 8 February 2010

Neville Shelmerdine (23 December 1909 – 2 September 1992) was a first-class cricketer who played one match for the Royal Air Force cricket team in 1945. A right-handed batsman and right-arm off break and medium pace bowler, Shelmerdine did not bat or bowl in his only appearance, which came against Yorkshire County Cricket Club.

He also appeared for the Royal Air Force against Northern Command in a one-day, single-innings contest in 1944, although this wasn't considered a first-class cricket match. He made a duck in the match.
