= Leonard Oakley =

English cricketer

Personal information
- Full name: Leonard Oakley
- Born: 11 January 1916; Stourbridge, Worcestershire, England
- Died: 9 January 1974 (aged 57); Dudley, Worcestershire, England
- Batting: Left-handed
- Bowling: Slow left arm orthodox

Domestic team information
- Years: Team
- 1935–1948: Worcestershire
- FC debut: 26 June 1935 Worcestershire v Middlesex
- Last FC: 18 June 1948 Worcestershire v Lancashire

Career statistics
Competition	First-class
Matches	8
Runs scored	43
Batting average	4.77
100s/50s	0/0
Top score	11
Balls bowled	708
Wickets	12
Bowling average	32.75
5 wickets in innings	1
10 wickets in match	0
Best bowling	6/64
Catches/stumpings	2/–
- Source: CricketArchive, 20 September 2007

Leonard Oakley (11 January 1916 – 9 January 1974) was an English cricketer who played eight first-class games for Worcestershire County Cricket Club either side of the Second World War. A bowler, in 14 innings he never scored more than 11 runs.

Oakley made his debut for Worcestershire against Middlesex at Worcester in late June 1935, taking the single wicket of Fred Price and scoring 6 and 0 from number ten. He played against Gloucestershire a few days later, taking one more wicket, and made two wicketless appearances in 1937, but those games comprised his entire remaining pre-war career.

He returned to first-class action with a bang in June 1946, taking eight wickets against the Royal Air Force in what was to prove the RAF's last first-class match. His first innings 2-18 and second-innings 6-64, which contributed largely towards his county's victory, were the only times he ever took more than two wickets in a first-class innings. However, two subsequent County Championship games brought Oakley only one wicket in total, and he played no more for two years.

In June 1948, Oakley took 5–44 in each innings of a Second XI match against Glamorgan II, and was recalled to the first team for the Championship match with Lancashire at Manchester a week later. However, he could manage only 1-71 from 17 overs, and he never played first-class cricket again.
