= Violet Elton =

English badminton player

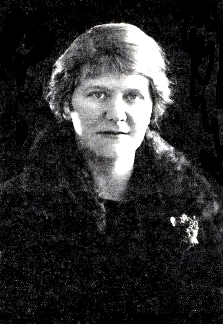

Personal information
- Born: 13 February 1889 India
- Died: 4 March 1969 (aged 80) Sidmouth, Devon

Sport
- Country: England
- Sport: Badminton

Violet Helen Strachan Elton (1889-1969) was an English badminton player. She started playing badminton in India at the age of seven. After joining a club playing at the Territorial Drill Hall in Kensington she started to come to prominence. She won five All England titles. She was capped nine times by England between 1924 and 1930. Elton died on March 4, 1969, in Sidmouth.

== Medal Record at the All England Badminton Championships ==
Medal	Year	Event
Gold medal – first place	1920	Women's doubles
Gold medal – first place	1926	Women's doubles
Gold medal – first place	1928	Women's doubles
Gold medal – first place	1929	Women's doubles
Gold medal – first place	1930	Women's doubles
