= Arthur Kenneth Jones =

English badminton player (1887–1975)

A. K. Jones
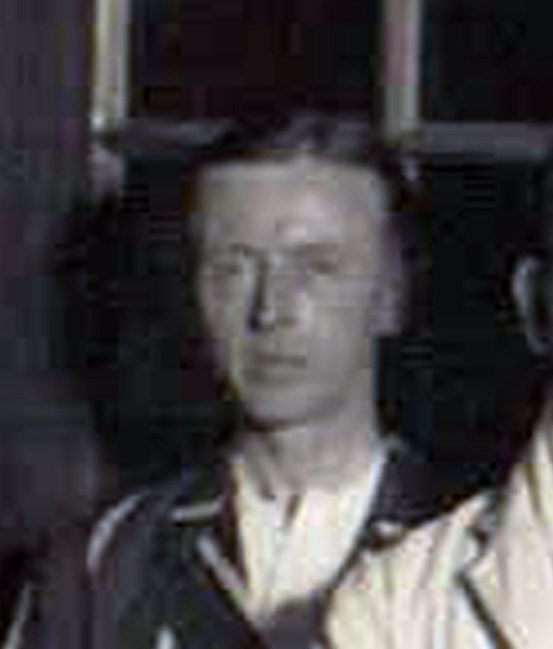

Personal information
- Born: 7 September 1887 Southampton
- Died: first quarter 1975 Salisbury

Sport
- Country: England
- Sport: Badminton
Medal record
Representing ENG
All England Open Badminton Championships
Gold medal – first place	1925 London	doubles

Arthur Kenneth Jones known as A. K. Jones (1887 – 1975) was an English international badminton player. He was born in Southampton.

== Career ==
Arthur Kenneth Jones won the 1925 All England Badminton Championships in the men's doubles event. Until 1977 the tournament was the unofficial world championships. Jones was a pioneer of the sport. In 1925–26 he belonged to an English touring team, who travelled to Canada and the United States for two months to develop the sport in those countries on behalf of the Canadian Badminton Association which had recently been formed in 1921.

== Records ==
Season	Event	Disziplin	Place	Name
1925	All England	Men´s doubles	1	Herbert Uber / Arthur Kenneth Jones

== Personal life ==
He was a bank clerk by profession and lived in Richmond, Surrey. He died in Salisbury.
