= Queenie Allen =

English badminton player

- Born: December 1911
- Died: 2 August 2007 (aged 95)
- Other names: Queenie Webber (married name), Queenie Allen-Webber, Q. M. Allen
- Occupation: badminton player

Queenie Mary Allen (December 1911 — 2 August 2007), later Queenie Webber, was an English badminton player from the 1930s into 1950s. She won the women's doubles title at the All England Open Badminton Championships in 1949 with Betty Uber. She also won international competitions in Denmark, Scotland, South Africa, Ireland, and France.

== Career ==
Allen competed in the 1934 All England Badminton Championships. At the 1948 South African Badminton Championships, Allen won in the women's doubles category, with her partner Betty Uber. In 1947, 1948, and 1949, she won the women's singles category at the Irish Open; she also won the women's doubles category at the Irish Open in 1947 and 1949 with Betty Uber, and the mixed doubles category in 1949 with Harold Marsland. She won the women's singles category at the Scottish Open in 1948, 1949, and 1950; she also won the women's doubles category at the Scottish Open with Betty Uber in 1948, 1949, 1950, 1951, and 1953. At the French Open, she won the mixed doubles title with Malaysian player Eddy Choong in 1951 and 1952, and the ladies doubles title with Audrey Stone in 1951.

At the 1949 All England Badminton Championships, Allen won in the women's doubles category, with her partner Betty Uber, and finished as a runner-up in the mixed doubles category, with her partner T. Wynn Rogers. At the 1951 All England Badminton Championships, Queenie Webber (using her married name) finished as a runner-up in the women's doubles category, with her partner Mavis Henderson.

She played in the first badminton games broadcast on television in the United Kingdom, and her colleague recalled, "We had been told that white did not televise well, so that we must all wear colours no matter what they were. Queenie wore a blue skirt and yellow shirt, and I wore a black skirt and red-and-white shirt."

== Singing ==
Queenie Allen-Webber was also a contralto singer. She performed in concert at Wigmore Hall in 1955.

== Personal life ==
Queenie Allen married F. G. Webber. She died at a rest home in Sussex in 2007, aged 95 years.

== Achievements ==
=== International tournaments (20 titles, 16 runners-up) ===
Women's singles
Year	Tournament	Opponent	Score	Result
1939	Denmark Open	(Denmark) Tonny Ahm	5–11, 4–11	(silver) Runner-up
1947	Irish Open	(England) Betty Uber	11–7, 11–8	(gold) Winner
1948	Scottish Open	(England) Betty Uber	walkover	(gold) Winner
1948	Irish Open	(Republic of Ireland) Barbara Good	11–9, 11–6	(gold) Winner
1949	Scottish Open	(Scotland) Nancy Horner	12–10, 11–4	(gold) Winner
1949	Irish Open	(Republic of Ireland) Barbara Good	11–2, 11–3	(gold) Winner
1950	Scottish Open	(England) Betty Uber	10–12, 11–7, 11–8	(gold) Winner

Women's doubles
Year	Tournament	Partner	Opponent	Score	Result
1938	Welsh International	(England) Bessie Staples	(England) Diana Doveton (England) Betty Uber	6–15, 6–15	(silver) Runner-up
1939	Denmark Open	(Denmark) Ruth Dalsgaard	(England) Bessie Staples (England) Diana Doveton	12–15, 15–10, 15–11	(gold) Winner
1947	Irish Open	(England) Betty Uber	(Republic of Ireland) Nora Conway (Republic of Ireland) Barbara Good	15–8, 15–11	(gold) Winner
1948	Scottish Open	(England) Betty Uber	(Republic of Ireland) Nora Conway (Republic of Ireland) Barbara Good	15–3, 15–10	(gold) Winner
1948	Irish Open	(England) V. E. Duringer	(Republic of Ireland) Nora Conway (Republic of Ireland) Barbara Good	16–18, 5–15	(silver) Runner-up
1948	All England Open	(England) Betty Uber	(Denmark) Tonny Ahm (Denmark) Kirsten Thorndahl	6–15, 15–12, 2–15	(silver) Runner-up
1948	South African Championships	(England) Betty Uber	(South Africa) B. Bayne (South Africa) Florrie Mackenzie	15–7, 15–8	(gold) Winner
1948	Denmark Open	(England) Betty Uber	(Denmark) Tonny Ahm (Denmark) Kirsten Thorndahl	4–15, 11–15	(silver) Runner-up
1949	Scottish Open	(England) Betty Uber	(England) V. E. Duringer (England) Joy Saunders	15–7, 15–2	(gold) Winner
1949	Irish Open	(England) Betty Uber	(Republic of Ireland) Nora Conway (Republic of Ireland) Barbara Good	15–1, 15–7	(gold) Winner
1949	All England Open	(England) Betty Uber	(Denmark) Tonny Ahm (Denmark) Kirsten Thorndahl	15–8, 15–10	(gold) Winner
1950	Scottish Open	(England) Betty Uber	(England) V. E. Duringer (Scotland) Nancy Horner	15–5, 15–8	(gold) Winner
1950	All England Open	(England) Betty Uber	(Denmark) Tonny Ahm (Denmark) Kirsten Thorndahl	17–16, 5–15, 8–15	(silver) Runner-up
1950	Denmark Open	(England) Elisabeth O'Beirne	(Denmark) Tonny Ahm (Denmark) Kirsten Thorndahl	2–15, 6–15	(silver) Runner-up
1951	Scottish Open	(England) Betty Uber	(Malaysia) Amy Choong (England) Elisabeth O'Beirne	15–4, 15–7	(gold) Winner
1951	Irish Open	(England) L. R. Ludlam	(Malaysia) Amy Choong (England) Elisabeth O'Beirne	8–15, 13–15	(silver) Runner-up
1951	All England Open	(England) Mavis Henderson	(Denmark) Tonny Ahm (Denmark) Kirsten Thorndahl	15–17, 7–15	(silver) Runner-up
1951	French Open	(England) Audrey Stone	(England) Betty Grace (England) Mimi Wyatt	15–8, 9–15, 18–14	(gold) Winner
1952	All England Open	(England) Betty Uber	(Denmark) Tonny Ahm (Denmark) Aase Schiøtt Jacobsen	15–18, 4–15	(silver) Runner-up
1952	French Open	(England) Mimi Wyatt	(England) Mavis Henderson (England) Audrey Stone	12–15, 6–15	(silver) Runner-up
1953	Scottish Open	(Scotland) Nancy Horner	(England) Barbara Rosson (England) Joy Saunders	15–6, 15–13	(gold) Winner

Mixed doubles
Year	Tournament	Partner	Opponent	Score	Result
1948	Scottish Open	(England) Harold Marsland	(Republic of Ireland) James Rankin (England) Betty Uber	12–15, 13–15	(silver) Runner-up
1948	South African Championships	(England) Noel Radford	(England) Warwick Shute (England) Betty Uber	13–15, 12–15	(silver) Runner-up
1949	Irish Open	(England) Harold Marsland	(Malaysia) Lim Kee Fong (Republic of Ireland) A. Love	14–18, 15–6, 15–4	(gold) Winner
1949	All England Open	(United States) Wynn Rogers	(United States) Clinton Stephens (United States) Patricia Stephens	5–15, 15–2, 12–15	(silver) Runner-up
1951	Scottish Open	(Republic of Ireland) Frank Peard	(England) Tom Wingfield (England) Betty Uber	15–12, 10–15, 12–15	(silver) Runner-up
1951	Irish Open	(Republic of Ireland) Frank Peard	(Malaysia) Eddy Choong (Malaysia) Amy Choong	9–15, 6–15	(silver) Runner-up
1951	French Open	(Malaysia) Eddy Choong	(Malaysia) Cheong Hock Leng (England) Audrey Stone	15–7, 15–7	(gold) Winner
1952	French Open	(Malaysia) Eddy Choong	(Malaysia) David Choong (England) Mimi Wyatt	12–15, 15–1, 15–11	(gold) Winner
