= Ruth Dalsgaard =

Danish badminton player

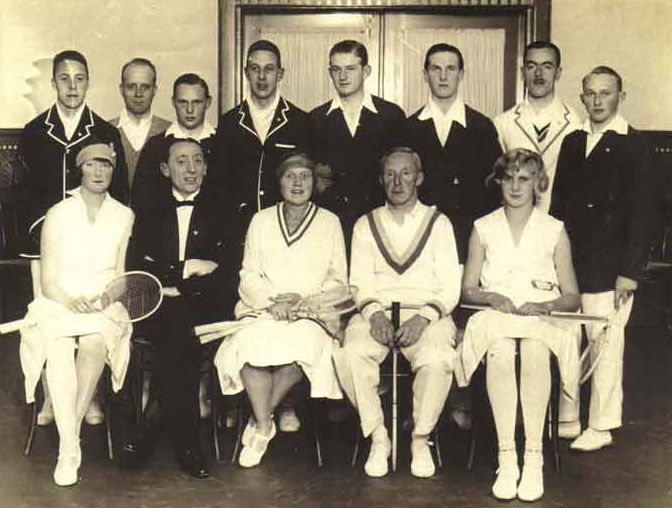

Sport
- Country: Denmark
- Sport: Badminton

Ruth Dalsgaard née Frederiksen was a former Danish badminton player. She won a national championship title every year from 1931 to 1935, teaming up with her sister Gerda. Further wins came in 1937 and 1942, the latter with her new partner Jytte Thayssen. In addition to this she won seven national titles in mixed doubles from 1933 to 1942. Her greatest achievement was winning the 1939 All England Badminton Championships doubles title with Tonny Ahm.

== Medal Record at the All England Badminton Championships ==
| Medal | Year | Event |
|---|---|---|
| Gold medal – first place | 1939 | Women's doubles |
