= John McCallum (badminton) =

John D. M. McCallum
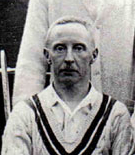
- McCallum at the 1923 Ireland versus England badminton match

Personal information
- Born: John Dunwoodie Martin McCallum; 2 September 1883 Belfast, Ireland
- Died: 14 January 1967 (aged 83) Belfast

Sport
- Country: Ireland
- Sport: Badminton

Major John Dunwoodie Martin McCallum DSO CBE also known as "the wee major" (2 September 1883 – 14 January 1967) was a Northern Irish soldier, resident magistrate, sportsman, sports administrator, and president of the International Badminton Federation.

== Early life and army career ==
McCallum was born in Belfast on 2 September 1883. His parents were Sarah Linden (née Martin) and John McCallum. His father was financial secretary of the then national education board of Ireland and chief inspector of national schools. The family lived on University Square, Belfast. McCallum attended the Royal Academical Institution and Queen's University Belfast (QUB), from which he graduated in 1906. In 1910 he was admitted as a solicitor, and practised in Belfast. In 1915 he married Eveleen Lindsay (née Lloyd) of Belfast.

He joined the Territorial Force in 1908, and was posted to the QUB officers' training corps. In 1911, he was promoted to captain, becoming captain and adjutant in the 8th (Service) Battalion (East Belfast), Royal Irish Rifles in 1914. As part of the 36th (Ulster) Division, McCallum was posted to France in 1915 during World War I. He was awarded a DSO for his part in the Battle of the Somme, and a Croix de Guerre in 1918. During the occupation of Cologne, he served as second-in-command of the 12th (Service) Battalion (Central Antrim), Royal Irish Rifles. After the war he was appointed the resident magistrate (RM) for County Clare in 1920, but left this position to become the commandant of the Royal Irish Constabulary camp at Newtownards, County Down from 1920 to 1922. In 1921 he was appointed CBE. From 1922 to 1943 he was RM in Newry, and later took up the same position in Belfast from 1943 until he retired in September 1953.

== Sporting career ==
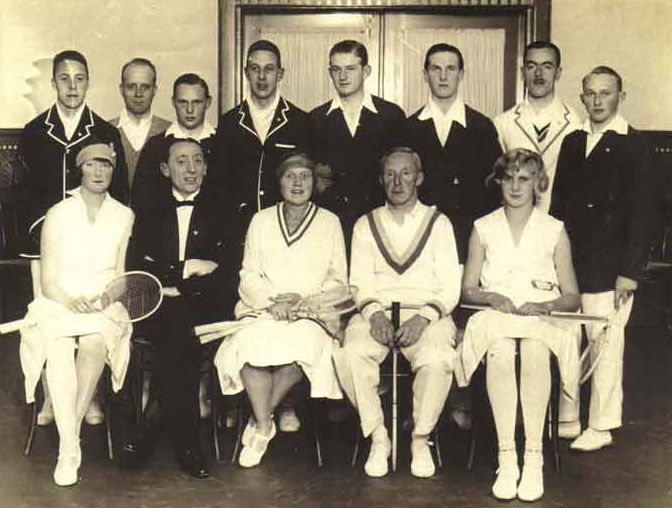
McCallum with the Strollers, 1928

McCallum was an accomplished sportsman in a number of sports. He played cricket for Ireland in 1910 as a wicket-keeper, and was a traillist for the international rugby team. He is most remembered for his badminton career, in which he played for Ireland 8 times in two different periods, in 1913 to 1914 and in 1920 to 1926. For 52 years he served as the secretary of the northern branch of the Badminton Union of Ireland, also serving as president, and later president of the International Badminton Federation in 1961 to 1963. He is credited with the development of badminton in Denmark.

McCallum died in Belfast on 14 January 1967. He was entered into the Badminton Hall of Fame in 1997.

== Achievements ==
Year	Tournament	Event	Winners
1927	Welsh International	Men's doubles	McCallum / Alan Titherley
1929	Irish Open	Men's doubles	McCallum / George Alan Thomas
1933	Dutch Open	Men's doubles	McCallum / F. L. Treasure
