= Marjorie Barrett =

English badminton player

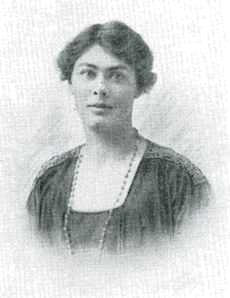

Personal information
- Born: 1889 Camberwell, England
- Died: 1968 (aged 78–79) Newton Abbott

Sport
- Country: England
- Sport: Badminton
- Handedness: Left

Marjorie Barrett born Lucy Marjory East (1889-1968) was an English badminton player.

== Biography ==
She started playing badminton in the village of Shaldon in Devon where Meriel Lucas tutored her. After becoming a member of the Crystal Palace Club she married Frederick Barrett in 1915. The left hander became a force after the war and secured five All England singles titles.

Her husband died in 1932 and she remarried in 1949 to another badminton player Percy Macfarlane. She died in 1968, aged 79 in Newton Abbott. Her brother Frederick Arthur Dudley East married Dorothy Lyon, another leading badminton player at the time.

== Medal Record at the All England Badminton Championships ==
Medal	Year	Event
Gold medal – first place	1926	Women's singles
Gold medal – first place	1927	Women's singles
Gold medal – first place	1929	Women's singles
Gold medal – first place	1930	Women's singles
Gold medal – first place	1931	Women's singles
Gold medal – first place	1928	Women's doubles
Gold medal – first place	1929	Women's doubles
Gold medal – first place	1930	Women's doubles
Gold medal – first place	1932	Women's doubles
