= Albert Harbot =

English badminton player

Personal information
- Born: 4th Quarter 1896 Leicester, Leicestershire, England, United Kingdom
- Died: 28 January 1968 (aged 71–72) Birkenhead, Cheshire, England, United Kingdom

Sport
- Country: England
- Sport: Badminton

Albert Edward Harbot (1896–1968), was a male badminton player from England.

== Badminton career ==
Harbot born in Leicester was a winner of the All England Open Badminton Championships. He won the mixed doubles in 1928 with Margaret Tragett.

He gained his England caps while playing for Hampshire.
