= Dorothy Colpoys =

Personal information
- Born: 26 November 1894 Surrey
- Died: 22 October 1980 (aged 85) Devon

Sport
- Country: England; Ireland
- Sport: Badminton

Dorothy Josephine Colpoys (26 November 1894 – 22 October 1980), was a badminton player from England who represented Ireland at badminton.

== Badminton career ==
Colpoys was born in Surrey and competed in the All England Open Badminton Championships. She was runner-up in the women's doubles at the 1929 All England Badminton Championships and 1930 All England Badminton Championships.

She won the 1930 and 1931 Welsh International singles and 1938 doubles. Despite being born and living in England Colpoys represented Ireland, with the likely reason being the fact that she had an Irish father.
