= Herbert Uber =

English badminton player

Personal information
- Born: 25 August 1885 Lambeth
- Died: 31 May 1969 (aged 83) Dorset

Sport
- Country: England
- Sport: Badminton

Herbert Septimus Uber (1885–1969) was an English badminton player.

== Badminton career ==
Uber born in Lambeth was a four-time winner of the All England Open Badminton Championships. He won the men's doubles in 1925 and then won three more titles in mixed doubles.

He gained his England caps while playing for Surrey.

He was part of the English touring team that visited Canada during 1930. A match was held at the Granite Club in Toronto, which England won 7-2.

== Family ==
His mixed doubles title were won with his wife Betty (née Corbin), whom he married in 1925. Betty Uber is the namesake of the Uber Cup women's badminton competition.
