= Lawrence Hall, London =

Building of the Royal Horticultural Society, UK

Coordinates: 51.4950°N 0.1339°W

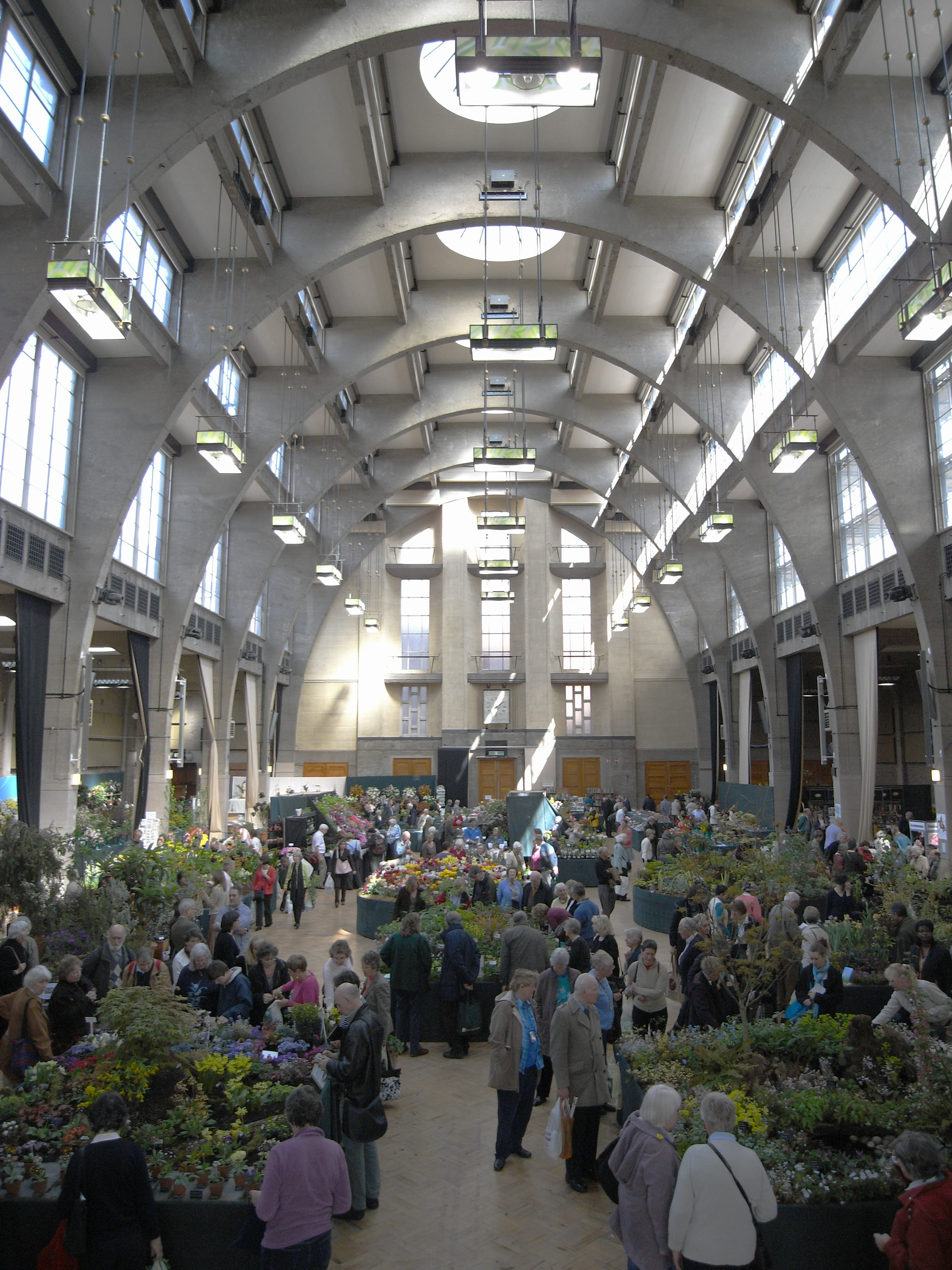
London flower show in Lawrence Hall

Lawrence Hall in Greycoat Street, Westminster is a building which is currently used as a sports centre and before that has been used as the newer of the two Royal Horticultural Halls owned by R.H.S. Enterprises Limited, which is part of the Royal Horticultural Society charity in central London. The other is Lindley Hall in Elverton Street; both are close to the RHS' headquarters in Vincent Square. The site of Lawrence Hall incorporates a self-contained purpose-built conference centre above the main hall. The building's name relates to Trevor Lawrence, president of the Royal Horticultural Society from 1885 to 1913 who was chiefly responsible for moving the Society from its expensive Kensington site to a more practical home in Westminster in 1904.

Lawrence Hall has vaulted ceilings and Art Deco interior features. It was awarded a gold medal by the Royal Institute of British Architects for its dramatic architecture. It was constructed between 1925 and 1928 and was designed by the partnership of Easton and Robertson. The tall parabolic arches which begin as square piers are credited to Easton, derived from the reinforced concrete work of Hennebique and Freyssinet. It has been listed Grade II* on the National Heritage List for England since 1983.

Lawrence Hall and the conference centre underwent a £1.2 million renovation in 2006. Although built as an exhibition hall, Lawrence Hall was increasingly used for product launches and conferences. In December 2011, the RHS announced that it had leased the hall for 999 years to Westminster School for £18 million, the terms allowing the hall to continue to be used for four RHS flower shows each year. Westminster School has converted the building for use as a sports centre.

It was used as a filming location for Pink Floyd - The Wall, Indiana Jones and the Last Crusade, Richard III, The Saint, Killing Eve, and Children of Men.
