= Royal Air Force cricket team =

The Royal Air Force cricket team is a cricket side representing the British Royal Air Force. The team played 11 first-class matches: nine between 1922 and 1932, mostly against other branches of the Services, and another two in 1945 and 1946. Their home ground is the Royal Air Force Sports Ground, Uxbridge.

A number of notable cricketers played for the RAF team in its first-class days. Their side for the first such game, against Rest of England at Eastbourne in September 1922, included no fewer than eight current or future Test cricketers: Jack Hobbs, Wally Hardinge, Frank Woolley, Percy Fender, Harold Gilligan, George Geary, Charlie Parker and Abe Waddington (though none of them were currently serving in the RAF). However, after this festival game, the RAF did not play another first-class match for five years.

Douglas Bader's only match of first-class cricket came for the RAF against the Army at The Oval in 1931.

Since the 1940s, the RAF side has continued to compete in minor cricket.

== See also ==
- Royal Navy Cricket Club
- British Army cricket team
- Combined Services cricket team
