= Lene Mørk =

Danish badminton player (born 1979)

Lene Mørk Christiansen
Personal information
- Born: 26 October 1979 (age 47)
- Height: 175 cm (5 ft 9 in)

Sport
- Country: Denmark
- Sport: Badminton
- Handedness: Right
- Event: Doubles

Doubles
- BWF profile
Medal record
Women's badminton
Representing Denmark
European Junior Championships
Gold medal – first place	1997 Nymburk	Girls' doubles
Gold medal – first place	1997 Nymburk	Mixed team
Bronze medal – third place	1997 Nymburk	Mixed doubles

Lene Mørk Christiansen (born 26 October 1979) is a Danish retired badminton player.

== Achievements ==
=== European Junior Championships ===
Girls' doubles
Year	Venue	Partner	Opponent	Score	Result
1997	Nymburk, Czech Republic	(Denmark) Jane F. Bramsen	(Denmark) Jane Jacoby (Denmark) Britta Andersen	17–15, 15–11	Gold

Mixed doubles
Year	Venue	Partner	Opponent	Score	Result
1997	Nymburk, Czech Republic	(Denmark) Kasper Ødum	(Denmark) Ove Svejstrup (Denmark) Britta Andersen	1–15, 10–15	Bronze

=== IBF Grand Prix ===
The World Badminton Grand Prix sanctioned by International Badminton Federation since 1983.

Women's doubles
Year	Tournament	Partner	Opponent	Score	Result
2000	Polish Open	(Denmark) Britta Andersen	(Japan) Yoshiko Iwata (Japan) Haruko Matsuda	4–15, 10–15	(silver) Runner-up

=== IBF International ===
Women's doubles
Year	Tournament	Partner	Opponent	Score	Result
2003	Finnish International	(Denmark) Julie Houmann	(Poland) Kamila Augustyn (Poland) Nadieżda Kostiuczyk	11–5, 8–11, 5–11	(silver) Runner-up
2002	Austrian International	(Denmark) Helle Nielsen	(Russia) Marina Yakusheva (Russia) Elena Shimko	7–4, 7–0, 7–5	(gold) Winner
2002	Portugal International	(Denmark) Helle Nielsen	(Denmark) Kamilla Rytter Juhl (Denmark) Lena Frier Kristiansen	7–2, 7–3, 7–0	(gold) Winner
2001	Irish International	(Denmark) Helle Nielsen	(Denmark) Kamilla Rytter Juhl (Denmark) Lena Frier Kristiansen	7–3, 7–3, 7–2	(gold) Winner
2001	Austrian International	(Denmark) Britta Andersen	(Russia) Ella Karachkova (Russia) Anastasia Russkikh	15–12, 7–15, 16–17	(silver) Runner-up
2001	Croatian International	(Denmark) Britta Andersen	(Netherlands) Erica van den Heuvel (Netherlands) Nicole van Hooren	9–15, 12–15	(silver) Runner-up
2000	Slovenian International	(Denmark) Britta Andersen	(Denmark) Julie Houmann (Denmark) Anne Marie Pedersen	15–8, 15–8	(gold) Winner
2000	Czech International	(Denmark) Britta Andersen	(Germany) Petra Overzier (Germany) Kathrin Piotrowski	17–14, 15–8	(gold) Winner
2000	Romanian International	(Denmark) Britta Andersen	(Austria) Verena Fastenbauer (Austria) Karina Lengauer	15–5, 15–1	(gold) Winner
2000	Portugal International	(Denmark) Britta Andersen	(England) Joanne Davies (England) Sara Hardaker	15–12, 15–12	(gold) Winner
1999	BMW International	(Denmark) Britta Andersen	(Germany) Katja Michalowsky (Germany) Karen Stechmann	15–10, 15–9	(gold) Winner
1998	Hungarian International	(Denmark) Britta Andersen	(Denmark) Rikke Broen (Denmark) Sara Runesten	3–15, 8–15	(silver) Runner-up
1998	Amor International	(Denmark) Britta Andersen	(Netherlands) Lotte Jonathans (Netherlands) Nicole van Hooren	6–15, 3–15	(silver) Runner-up

Mixed doubles
Year	Tournament	Partner	Opponent	Score	Result
2003	Finnish International	(Denmark) Kasper Ødum	(Denmark) Thomas Laybourn (Denmark) Julie Houmann	5–11, 8–11	(silver) Runner-up
2001	Austrian International	(Denmark) Peter Steffensen	(Denmark) Mathias Boe (Denmark) Britta Andersen	2–15, 5–15	(silver) Runner-up
2001	French Open International	(Denmark) Peter Steffensen	(Netherlands) Chris Bruil (Netherlands) Lotte Jonathans	0–7, 2–7, 1–7	(silver) Runner-up
2001	Croatian International	(Denmark) Peter Steffensen	(Denmark) Kristian Langbak (Denmark) Britta Andersen	15–10, 15–10	(gold) Winner
2000	Czech International	(Denmark) Jonas Glyager Jensen	(Denmark) Mathias Boe (Denmark) Britta Andersen	17–16, 7–15, 7–15	(silver) Runner-up
2000	Romanian International	(Denmark) Michael Jensen	(Denmark) Mathias Boe (Denmark) Britta Andersen	7–15, 8–15	(silver) Runner-up
1999	Scottish International	(Denmark) Peter Steffensen	(Denmark) Kristian Langbak (Denmark) Britta Andersen	9–15, 15–10, 9–15	(silver) Runner-up
1998	Hungarian International	(Denmark) Peter Steffensen	(Denmark) Martin Bruun (Denmark) Sara Runesten	11–15, 3–15	(silver) Runner-up
