= Julie Houmann =

Danish badminton player (born 1979)

Personal information
- Born: 22 November 1979 (age 46) Rønne, Bornholm, Denmark
- Height: 1.70 m (5 ft 7 in)

Sport
- Country: Denmark
- Sport: Badminton
- Handedness: Right

Women's & mixed doubles
- Highest ranking: 139 (WD 25 November 2010); 11 (XD 23 May 2013)
- BWF profile
Medal record
Women's badminton
Representing Denmark
Sudirman Cup
Bronze medal – third place	2013 Kuala Lumpur	Mixed team
European Championships
Silver medal – second place	2012 Karlskrona	Mixed doubles
Bronze medal – third place	2014 Kazan	Mixed doubles

Julie Houmann (born 22 November 1979) is a Danish badminton player and also plays for the Skovshoved Badminton originally comes from Bornholm. Her best achievements is to win the silver medal at the 2012 European Championships, and won the 2012 Bitburger Open.

== Achievements ==
=== European Championships ===
Mixed doubles
Year	Venue	Partner	Opponent	Score	Result
2014	Gymnastics Center, Kazan, Russia	(Denmark) Anders Kristiansen	(Denmark) Mads Pieler Kolding (Denmark) Kamilla Rytter Juhl	14–21, 17–21	Bronze
2012	Telenor Arena, Karlskrona, Sweden	(Denmark) Mads Pieler Kolding	(Poland) Robert Mateusiak (Poland) Nadieżda Zięba	12–21, 22–24	Silver

=== BWF Grand Prix ===
The BWF Grand Prix has two levels, the BWF Grand Prix and Grand Prix Gold. It is a series of badminton tournaments sanctioned by the Badminton World Federation (BWF) since 2007.

Mixed doubles
Year	Tournament	Partner	Opponent	Score	Result
2013	German Open	(Denmark) Anders Kristiansen	(South Korea) Shin Baek-choel (South Korea) Jang Ye-na	19–21, 21–19, 22–24	(silver) Runner-up
2012	Bitburger Open	(Denmark) Anders Kristiansen	(Poland) Robert Mateusiak (Poland) Nadieżda Zięba	21–11, 21–16	(gold) Winner

BWF Grand Prix Gold tournament
BWF Grand Prix tournament

=== BWF International Challenge/Series ===
Women's doubles
Year	Tournament	Partner	Opponent	Score	Result
2006	Spanish International	(Denmark) Mette Nielsen	(Germany) Carina Metter (Germany) Birgit Overzier	17–21, 21–12, 24–26	(silver) Runner-up
2003	Finnish International	(Denmark) Lene Mørk	(Poland) Kamila Augustyn (Poland) Nadieżda Kostiuczyk	11–5, 8–11, 5–11	(silver) Runner-up
2003	Portugal International	(Denmark) Helle Nielsen	(England) Ella Tripp (England) Joanne Wright	11–1, 3–11, 11–3	(gold) Winner
2001	Norwegian International	(Denmark) Karina Sørensen	(Denmark) Tine Høy (Denmark) Mie Nielsen	2–7, 7–4, 6–8, 7–1, 7–4	(gold) Winner
2001	Slovak International	(Denmark) Karina Sørensen	(Poland) Kamila Augustyn (Belarus) Nadieżda Kostiuczyk	4–7, 4–7, 1–7	(silver) Runner-up
2000	Slovenian International	(Denmark) Anne Marie Pedersen	(Denmark) Britta Andersen (Denmark) Lene Mørk	8–15, 8–15	(silver) Runner-up

Mixed doubles
Year	Tournament	Partner	Opponent	Score	Result
2012	Denmark International	(Denmark) Mads Pieler Kolding	(Denmark) Kim Astrup Sorensen (Denmark) Line Kjaersfeldt	21–19, 21–9	(gold) Winner
2012	Swedish Masters	(Denmark) Mads Pieler Kolding	(England) Nathan Robertson (England) Jenny Wallwork	17–21, 17–21	(silver) Runner-up
2011	Denmark International	(Denmark) Mads Pieler Kolding	(Denmark) Rasmus Bonde (Denmark) Maria Helsbøl	21–13, 21–15	(gold) Winner
2011	Austrian International	(Denmark) Mads Pieler Kolding	(Hong Kong) Wong Wai Hong (Hong Kong) Chau Hoi Wah	17–21, 11–21	(silver) Runner-up
2010	Turkey International	(Denmark) Mads Pieler Kolding	(France) Baptiste Careme (France) Laura Choinet	21–12, 21–18	(gold) Winner
2010	Dutch International	(Denmark) Christian John Skovgaard	(Denmark) Anders Skaarup Rasmussen (Denmark) Anne Skelbæk	17–21, 12–21	(silver) Runner-up
2008	Swedish International	(Denmark) Peter Steffensen	(Denmark) Mads Pieler Kolding (Denmark) Line Damkjaer Kruse	21–8, 21–17	(gold) Winner
2007	Swedish Masters	(Denmark) Jacob Chemnitz	(Denmark) Rasmus Bonde (Denmark) Christinna Pedersen	12–21, 8–21	(silver) Runner-up
2006	Swedish International	(Denmark) Jacob Chemnitz	(Indonesia) Imam Sodikin (Switzerland) Cynthia Tuwankotta	21–17, 21–23, 18–21	(silver) Runner-up
2005	Iceland International	(Denmark) Jacob Chemnitz	(Sweden) Henri Hurskainen (Sweden) Christinna Pedersen	5–15, 15–13, 11–15	(silver) Runner-up
2005	Hungarian International	(Denmark) Jacob Chemnitz	(Russia) Vladimir Malkov (Russia) Anastasia Russkikh	12–15, 12–15	(silver) Runner-up
2005	French International	(Denmark) Jacob Chemnitz	(France) Nabil Lasmari (Indonesia) Eny Widiowati	15–4, 7–15, 13–15	(silver) Runner-up
2003	Finnish International	(Denmark) Thomas Laybourn	(Denmark) Kasper Ødum (Denmark) Lene Mørk	11–5, 11–8	(gold) Winner
2001	Slovak International	(Denmark) Jesper Thomsen	(Belarus) Andrey Konakh (Belarus) Nadieżda Kostiuczyk	7–2, 7–4, 7–1	(gold) Winner

BWF International Challenge tournament
BWF International Series tournament
