= Dicky Palyama =

Dutch badminton player

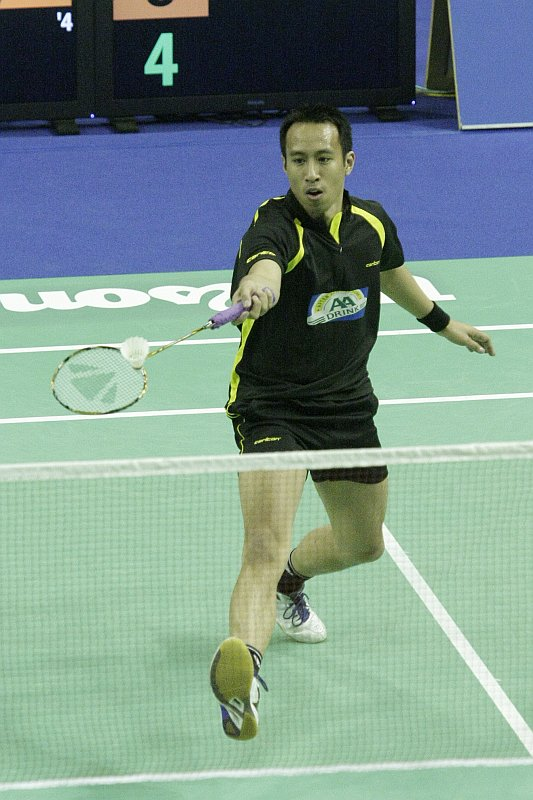

Personal information
- Born: March 26, 1978 (age 48) Gouda, Netherlands
- Height: 1.75 m (5 ft 9 in)
- Weight: 68 kg (150 lb)

Sport
- Country: Netherlands
- Sport: Badminton
- Handedness: Right

Men's Singles
- Highest ranking: 18 (January 21, 2010)
- BWF profile
Medal record
Badminton
Representing Netherlands
European Junior Championships
Gold medal – first place	1997 Nymburk	Boys' singles
Bronze medal – third place	1997 Nymburk	Mixed team

Dicky Palyama (born March 26, 1978, in Gouda) is a male badminton player from the Netherlands.

== Early career ==
After winning four junior titles in the Netherlands between 1994 and 1996, Dicky took the European junior U19 title in 1997. His first success as a professional came in 1998, when he took the Welsh Open International title. In 2000 he took his first National Dutch Championship; he has since won a record nine individual singles Dutch Championship titles. In 2002 he won the Spanish International Badminton Tournament and in 2003 the Bitburger Open International.

== 2007 European Cup ==
As a part of the BC Amersfoort team with Lotte Bruil-Jonathans, Yao Jie, Larisa Griga, Chris Bruil and Eric Pang, Palyama reached the final of the European Cup 2007 in Amersfoort by defeating CB Rinconada in the semi-finals. Unfortunately they fell to the NL Primorje team in the finals.

== Later career ==
In 2008 Palyama won the Russian Open Grand Prix. In 2009 he won both the Dutch & Polish Open International Challenges. In 2010 he won the Strasbourg Masters. Dicky Palyama retired as a professional badminton player in October 2013 with a special farewell demonstration match at the Yonex Dutch Open 2013 in front of a packed house at the Almere Topsport Centre against Peter Gade.

== Major achievements ==
Men's singles

Year	Venue/Tournament	Result
European Junior Championships
1997	Nymburk, Czech Republic	1
BWF Grand Prix
2012	Dutch Open	2
2008	Russian Open	1
BWF International Challenge/Series/BE Circuit
2012	Belgian International	2
2009	Polish International	1
2009	Dutch International	1
2009	Swedish International	2
2002	Spanish International	1
1997	Welsh International	1

== Personal life ==
Dicky Palyama married in 2009; he and his wife have two children. Dicky is currently a trainer/coach at the Regional Training Centre of Almere and an assistant coach of the Dutch National junior squad. Dicky Palyama was also head coach of Dutch premier division club The Flying Shuttle Barendrecht for a short period.
