= Pernille Harder (badminton) =

Danish badminton player (born 1977)

Personal information
- Born: 3 September 1977 (age 49) Odder, Denmark
- Height: 1.69 m (5 ft 7 in)
- Weight: 64 kg (141 lb)

Sport
- Country: Denmark
- Sport: Badminton
- Handedness: Right
- Event: Women's doubles

Women's doubles
- BWF profile
Medal record
Women's badminton
Representing Denmark
Sudirman Cup
Bronze medal – third place	2005 Beijing	Mixed team
Uber Cup
Silver medal – second place	2000 Kuala Lumpur	Women's team
Bronze medal – third place	1998 Hong Kong	Women's team
Bronze medal – third place	2004 Jakarta	Women's team
European Championships
Silver medal – second place	2002 Malmö	Women's doubles
Bronze medal – third place	2004 Geneva	Women's doubles
European Mixed Team Championships
Gold medal – first place	2002 Malmö	Mixed team
Gold medal – first place	2004 Geneva	Mixed team
European Junior Championships
Gold medal – first place	1995 Nitra	Mixed team
Silver medal – second place	1995 Nitra	Mixed doubles
Bronze medal – third place	1995 Nitra	Girls' singles

Pernille Harder (born 3 September 1977) is a Danish former badminton player from Kastrup-Magleby BK.

Harder competed in badminton at the 2004 Summer Olympics in women's doubles with partner Mette Schjoldager. They beat the Australian pairs Jane Crabtree and Kate Wilson-Smith, but the duo were defeated by Ra Kyung-min and Lee Kyung-won of South Korea in the round of 16.

== Achievements ==
=== European Championships ===
Women's doubles
Year	Venue	Partner	Opponent	Score	Result
2002	Baltiska hallen Malmö, Sweden	(Denmark) Mette Schjoldager	(Denmark) Jane F. Bramsen (Denmark) Ann-Lou Jørgensen	4–7, 1–7, 5–7	Silver
2004	Palais de Sports; Geneva, Switzerland	(Denmark) Mette Schjoldager	(Netherlands) Lotte Bruil (Netherlands) Mia Audina	4–15, 9–15	Bronze

=== European Junior Championships ===
Girls' singles
Year	Venue	Opponent	Score	Result
1995	Športová hala Olympia; Nitra, Slovakia	(Netherlands) Brenda Beenhakker	3–11, 8–11	Bronze

Mixed doubles
Year	Venue	Partner	Opponent	Score	Result
1995	Športová hala Olympia; Nitra, Slovakia	(Denmark) Jonas Rasmussen	(Denmark) Peder Nissen (Denmark) Mette Hansen	5–15, 4–15	Silver

=== IBF World Grand Prix ===
Women's doubles
Year	Tournament	Partner	Opponent	Score	Result
1997	Dutch Open	(Wales) Kelly Morgan	(Netherlands) Erica van den Heuvel (Netherlands) Monique Hoogland	15–9, 15–9	(gold) Winner
2000	Swedish Open	(Denmark) Jane F. Bramsen	(Japan) Yoshiko Iwata (Japan) Haruko Matsuda	15–12, 17–15	(gold) Winner
2001	U.S. Open	(Denmark) Majken Vange	(South Korea) Kim Kyeung-ran (South Korea) Ra Kyung-min	1–7, 0–7, 3–7	(silver) Runner-up
2001	Dutch Open	(Denmark) Majken Vange	(Russia) Anastasia Russkikh (China) Xu Huaiwen	7–3, 2–7, 0–7, 7–4, 5–7	(silver) Runner-up
2004	Dutch Open	(Denmark) Helle Nielsen	(Denmark) Lena Frier Kristiansen (Denmark) Kamilla Rytter Juhl	12–15, 8–15	(silver) Runner-up

Mixed doubles
Year	Tournament	Partner	Opponent	Score	Result
1999	U.S. Open	(Denmark) Michael Lamp	(Denmark) Jonas Rasmussen (Denmark) Jane F. Bramsen	3–15, 10–15	(silver) Runner-up
1999	Dutch Open	(Denmark) Martin Lundgaard Hansen	(China) Chen Qiqiu (China) Chen Lin	11–15, 15–9, 10–15	(silver) Runner-up

=== IBF International ===
Women's singles
Year	Tournament	Opponent	Score	Result
1996	Irish International	(Denmark) Mette Pedersen	11–6, 11–5	(gold) Winner
1997	Peru International	(Peru) Lorena Blanco	17–15, 15–12	(gold) Winner

Women's doubles
Year	Tournament	Partner	Opponent	Score	Result
1995	Norwegian International	(Denmark) Majken Vange	(Denmark) Gitte Jansson (Denmark) Mette Schjoldager	7–15, 12–15	(silver) Runner-up
1995	Irish International	(Denmark) Majken Vange	(Denmark) Rikke Olsen (Denmark) Mette Schjoldager	15–10, 4–15, 15–9	(gold) Winner
1996	Austrian International	(Denmark) Majken Vange	(Denmark) Gitte Jansson (Denmark) Mette Schjoldager	15–6, 15–12	(gold) Winner
1996	Malmö International	(Denmark) Ann-Lou Jørgensen	(Sweden) Maria Bengtsson (Sweden) Margit Borg	4–15, 7–15	(silver) Runner-up
1996	Norwegian International	(Denmark) Mette Schjoldager	(Sweden) Johanna Holgersson (Sweden) Jenny Karlsson	4–9, 9–0, 9–7, 9–8	(gold) Winner
1997	Peru International	(Sweden) Johanna Holgersson	(Peru) Ximena Bellido (Peru) Lorena Blanco	15–6, 15–11	(gold) Winner
1997	Irish International	(Denmark) Mette Schjoldager	(Denmark) Britta Andersen (Denmark) Christina Sørensen	15–2, 15–8	(gold) Winner
2000	Scottish International	(Denmark) Majken Vange	(Switzerland) Judith Baumeyer (Switzerland) Santi Wibowo	15–2, 15–2	(gold) Winner
2003	Spanish International	(Denmark) Mette Schjoldager	(England) Ella Tripp (England) Joanne Wright	15–10, 12–15, 15–8	(gold) Winner
2004	Irish International	(Denmark) Helle Nielsen	(Malaysia) Chor Hooi Yee (Malaysia) Lim Pek Siah	15–7, 15–6	(gold) Winner

Mixed doubles
Year	Tournament	Partner	Opponent	Score	Result
1995	Czech International	(Denmark) Janek Roos	(Denmark) Thomas Stavngaard (Denmark) Mette Schjoldager	4–15, 15–4, 15–8	(gold) Winner
1997	Peru International	(Denmark) Niels Christian Kaldau	(Peru) Gustavo Salazar (Peru) Lorena Blanco	15–12, 15–9	(gold) Winner
