= 2002 European Badminton Championships =

Tournament details
- Dates: 13–20 April
- Edition: 18
- Venue: Baltiska Hallen
- Location: Malmö, Sweden

The 18th European Badminton Championships were held in Malmö, Sweden, between 13 and 20 April 2002, and hosted by the European Badminton Union and Svenska Badmintonförbundet.

== Venue ==
This tournament was held at the Baltiska hallen, in Malmö.

== Medalists ==
Event	Gold	Silver	Bronze
Men's singles	(Denmark) Peter Rasmussen	(Denmark) Kenneth Jonassen	(Sweden) Rasmus Wengberg
Men's singles	(Denmark) Peter Rasmussen	(Denmark) Kenneth Jonassen	(Denmark) Anders Boesen
Women's singles	(Netherlands) Yao Jie	(Netherlands) Mia Audina Tjiptawan	(Denmark) Camilla Martin
Women's singles	(Netherlands) Yao Jie	(Netherlands) Mia Audina Tjiptawan	(Netherlands) Brenda Beenhakker
Men's doubles	(Denmark) Jens Eriksen and Martin Lundgaard Hansen	(England) Anthony Clark and Nathan Robertson	(Denmark) Lars Paaske and Jonas Rasmussen
Men's doubles	(Denmark) Jens Eriksen and Martin Lundgaard Hansen	(England) Anthony Clark and Nathan Robertson	(Poland) Michal Logosz and Robert Mateusiak
Women's doubles	(Denmark) Jane F. Bramsen and Ann-Lou Jørgensen	(Denmark) Pernille Harder and Mette Schjoldager	(Germany) Nicole Grether and Nicol Pitro
Women's doubles	(Denmark) Jane F. Bramsen and Ann-Lou Jørgensen	(Denmark) Pernille Harder and Mette Schjoldager	(England) Ella Miles and Sara Sankey
Mixed doubles	(Denmark) Jens Eriksen and Mette Schjoldager	(England) Nathan Robertson and Gail Emms	(Netherlands) Chris Bruil and Lotte Jonathans
Mixed doubles	(Denmark) Jens Eriksen and Mette Schjoldager	(England) Nathan Robertson and Gail Emms	(Denmark) Michael Søgaard and Rikke Olsen
Teams	Denmark	England	Netherlands

== Results ==
=== Semi-finals ===
Category	Winner	Runner-up	Score
Men's singles	(Denmark) Kenneth Jonassen	(Sweden) Rasmus Wengberg	7–1, 8–7, 7–4
Men's singles	(Denmark) Peter Rasmussen	(Denmark) Anders Boesen	5–7, 7–5, 5–7, 7–4, 7–5
Women's singles	(Netherlands) Yao Jie	(Denmark) Camilla Martin	0–7, 2–7, 7–0, 7–3, 7–1
Women's singles	(Netherlands) Mia Audina Tjiptawan	(Netherlands) Brenda Beenhakker	7–1, 8–6, 7–1
Men's doubles	(England) Anthony Clark (England) Nathan Robertson	(Denmark) Jonas Rasmussen (Denmark) Lars Paaske	7–3, 1–7, 7–1, 8–6
Men's doubles	(Denmark) Jens Eriksen (Denmark) Martin Lundgaard Hansen	(Poland) Michał Łogosz (Poland) Robert Mateusiak	7–1, 8–6, 7–1
Women's doubles	(Denmark) Mette Schjoldager (Denmark) Pernille Harder	(Germany) Nicole Grether (Germany) Nicol Pitro	7–1, 3–7, 7–4, 2–7, 7–1
Women's doubles	(Denmark) Ann-Lou Jørgensen (Denmark) Jane F. Bramsen	(England) Ella Miles (England) Sara Sankey	2–7, 7–4, 7–0, 7–0
Mixed doubles	(Denmark) Jens Eriksen (Denmark) Mette Schjoldager	(Netherlands) Chris Bruil (Netherlands) Lotte Jonathans	6–8, 7–3, 2–7, 7–3, 7–2
Mixed doubles	(England) Nathan Robertson (England) Gail Emms	(Denmark) Michael Søgaard (Denmark) Rikke Olsen	6–8, 7–2, 7–1, 7–5

=== Finals ===
Category	Winners	Runners-up	Score
Men's singles	(Denmark) Peter Rasmussen	(Denmark) Kenneth Jonassen	0–7, 7–5, 3–7, 7–5, 7–2
Women's singles	(Netherlands) Yao Jie	(Netherlands) Mia Audina Tjiptawan	8–6, 7–3, 7–1
Men's doubles	(Denmark) Jens Eriksen (Denmark) Martin Lundgaard Hansen	(England) Anthony Clark (England) Nathan Robertson	7–4, 1–7, 7–3, 2–7, 7–3
Women's doubles	(Denmark) Ann-Lou Jørgensen (Denmark) Jane F. Bramsen	(Denmark) Mette Schjoldager (Denmark) Pernille Harder	7–4, 7–1, 7–5
Mixed doubles	(Denmark) Jens Eriksen (Denmark) Mette Schjoldager	(England) Nathan Robertson (England) Gail Emms	7–5, 7–3, 7–1

== Medal account ==
Pos	Country	Gold	Silver	Bronze	Total
1	Denmark	5	2	4	11
2	Netherlands	1	1	3	5
3	England	0	3	1	4
4	Germany	0	0	1	1
4	Poland	0	0	1	1
4	Sweden	0	0	1	1
