= Mette Schjoldager =

Danish badminton player (born 1977)

Personal information
- Born: 21 April 1977 (age 49) Viby, Roskilde Municipality, Denmark
- Height: 1.68 m (5 ft 6 in)
- Weight: 61 kg (134 lb)

Sport
- Country: Denmark
- Sport: Badminton
- Handedness: Right
- Event: Women's & mixed doubles

Women's & mixed doubles
- BWF profile
Medal record
Women's badminton
Representing Denmark
Olympic Games
Bronze medal – third place	2004 Athens	Mixed doubles
World Championships
Bronze medal – third place	2001 Seville	Mixed doubles
World Cup
Bronze medal – third place	2005 Yiyang	Mixed doubles
Sudirman Cup
Bronze medal – third place	2005 Beijing	Mixed team
Bronze medal – third place	2003 Eindhoven	Mixed team
Bronze medal – third place	2001 Seville	Mixed team
Uber Cup
Silver medal – second place	2000 Kuala Lumpur	Women's team
Bronze medal – third place	2004 Jakarta	Women's team
European Championships
Gold medal – first place	2002 Malmö	Mixed doubles
Silver medal – second place	2006 Den Bosch	Mixed doubles
Silver medal – second place	2002 Malmö	Women's doubles
Silver medal – second place	2000 Glasgow	Mixed doubles
Bronze medal – third place	2004 Geneva	Women's doubles
Bronze medal – third place	2004 Geneva	Mixed doubles
European Mixed Team Championships
Gold medal – first place	2006 Den Bosch	Mixed team
Gold medal – first place	2004 Geneva	Mixed team
Gold medal – first place	2002 Malmö	Mixed team
Gold medal – first place	2000 Glasgow	Mixed team
European Junior Championships
Gold medal – first place	1995 Nitra	Mixed team
Bronze medal – third place	1995 Nitra	Girls' doubles

Mette Schjoldager (born 21 April 1977) is a Danish badminton player from Viby, Roskilde Municipality, on the island of Zealand.

== Career ==
Schjoldager made her debut at the Olympic Games in 2000 Sydney. Teamed-up with Ann-Lou Jørgensen, they beat Elena Nozdran and Victoria Evtoushenko of Ukraine in the first round, but was defeated in the second round by Indonesian pair Etty Tantri and Cynthia Tuwankotta. In the mixed doubles, she partnered with Jens Eriksen. The duo had a bye in the first round, beat Michael Keck and Nicol Pitro of German, and were defeated bye Tri Kusharjanto and Minarti Timur of Indonesia in the quarter-finals.

Schjoldager again competed in badminton at the 2004 Summer Olympics in women's doubles with partner Pernille Harder. They had a bye in the first round and were defeated by Ra Kyung-min and Lee Kyung-won of South Korea in the round of 16. In the mixed doubles with partner Jens Eriksen, they defeated Svetoslav Stoyanov and Victoria Wright of France in the first round, and Kim Yong-hyun and Lee Hyo-jung of South Korea in the second. In the quarter-finals, Schjoldager and Eriksen beat Nova Widianto and Vita Marissa of Indonesia 15–12, 15–8 to advance to the semi-finals. There, they lost to Zhang Jun and Gao Ling of China 15–9, 15–5. In the bronze medal match, they defeated fellow Danish pair Jonas Rasmussen and Rikke Olsen 15–5, 15–5 to win the bronze medal.

== Achievements ==
=== Olympic Games ===
Mixed doubles
Year	Venue	Partner	Opponent	Score	Result
2004	Goudi Olympic Hall; Athens, Greece	(Denmark) Jens Eriksen	(Denmark) Jonas Rasmussen (Denmark) Rikke Olsen	15–5, 15–5	Bronze

=== World Championships ===
Mixed doubles
Year	Venue	Partner	Opponent	Score	Result
2001	Palacio de Deportes de San Pablo; Seville, Spain	(Denmark) Jens Eriksen	(China) Zhang Jun (China) Gao Ling	2–15, 12–15	Bronze

=== World Cup ===
Mixed doubles
Year	Venue	Partner	Opponent	Score	Result
2005	Olympic Park; Yiyang, China	(Denmark) Jens Eriksen	(Indonesia) Nova Widianto (Indonesia) Liliyana Natsir	15–21, 18–21	Bronze

=== European Championships ===
Women's doubles
Year	Venue	Partner	Opponent	Score	Result
2002	Baltiska hallen Malmö, Sweden	(Denmark) Pernille Harder	(Denmark) Jane F. Bramsen (Denmark) Ann-Lou Jørgensen	4–7, 1–7, 5–7	Silver
2004	Queue d’Arve Sport Center,< Geneva, Switzerland	(Denmark) Pernille Harder	(Netherlands) Mia Audina (Netherlands) Lotte Bruil	4–15, 9–15	Bronze

Mixed doubles
Year	Venue	Partner	Opponent	Score	Result
2000	Kelvin Hall International Sports Arena; Glasgow, Scotland	(Denmark) Jens Eriksen	(Denmark) Michael Søgaard (Denmark) Rikke Olsen	7–15, 12–15	Silver
2002	Baltiska hallen Malmö, Sweden	(Denmark) Jens Eriksen	(England) Nathan Robertson (England) Gail Emms	7–5, 7–3, 7–1	Gold
2004	Queue d’Arve Sport Center; Geneva, Switzerland	(Denmark) Jens Eriksen	(England) Nathan Robertson (England) Gail Emms	16–17, 14–17	Bronze
2006	Maaspoort Sports and Events; Den Bosch, Netherlands	(Denmark) Jens Eriksen	(Denmark) Thomas Laybourn (Denmark) Kamilla Rytter Juhl	20–22, 15–21	Silver

=== European Junior Championships ===
Girls' doubles
Year	Venue	Partner	Opponent	Score	Result
1995	Športová hala Olympia; Nitra, Slovakia	(Denmark) Mette Hansen	(England) Donna Kellogg (England) Joanne Wright	11–15, 5–15	Bronze

=== IBF World Grand Prix ===
The World Badminton Grand Prix has been sanctioned by the International Badminton Federation from 1983 to 2006.

Women's doubles
Year	Tournament	Partner	Opponent	Score	Result
2001	German Open	(Denmark) Ann-Lou Jørgensen	(Denmark) Helene Kirkegaard (Denmark) Rikke Olsen	0–7, 7–8, 0–7	(silver) Runner-up
2001	Denmark Open	(Denmark) Ann-Lou Jørgensen	(Denmark) Helene Kirkegaard (Denmark) Rikke Olsen	2–7, 2–7, 3–7	(silver) Runner-up

Mixed doubles
Year	Tournament	Partner	Opponent	Score	Result
2000	Chinese Taipei Open	(Denmark) Jens Eriksen	(Denmark) Michael Søgaard (Denmark) Rikke Olsen	5–15, 9–15	(silver) Runner-up
2000	Denmark Open	(Denmark) Jens Eriksen	(Denmark) Michael Søgaard (Denmark) Rikke Olsen	10–15, 15–8, 10–15	(silver) Runner-up
2000	World Grand Prix Finals	(Denmark) Jens Eriksen	(Indonesia) Tri Kusharjanto (Indonesia) Minarti Timur	8–7, 7–4, 7–4	(gold) Winner
2001	Swiss Open	(Denmark) Jens Eriksen	(Denmark) Michael Søgaard (Denmark) Rikke Olsen	7–4, 7–2, 7–5	(gold) Winner
2001	Singapore Open	(Denmark) Jens Eriksen	(Denmark) Michael Søgaard (Denmark) Rikke Olsen	7–2, 4–7, 7–5, 7–5	(gold) Winner
2002	All England Open	(Denmark) Jens Eriksen	(South Korea) Kim Dong-moon (South Korea) Ra Kyung-min	3–7, 3–7, 0–7	(silver) Runner-up
2003	Swiss Open	(Denmark) Jens Eriksen	(South Korea) Kim Yong-hyun (South Korea) Lee Hyo-jung	11–7, 9–11, 11–5	(gold) Winner
2003	Japan Open	(Denmark) Jens Eriksen	(China) Zhang Jun (China) Gao Ling	11–9, 8–11, 9–11	(silver) Runner-up
2004	China Open	(Denmark) Jens Eriksen	(China) Chen Qiqiu (China) Zhao Tingting	15–13, 13–15, 15–8	(gold) Winner
2005	Korea Open	(Denmark) Jens Eriksen	(South Korea) Lee Jae-jin (South Korea) Lee Hyo-jung	14–17, 9–15	(silver) Runner-up
2005	Japan Open	(Denmark) Jens Eriksen	(Thailand) Sudket Prapakamol (Thailand) Saralee Thungthongkam	13–15, 17–14, 7–15	(silver) Runner-up
2006	Korea Open	(Denmark) Jens Eriksen	(Indonesia) Nova Widianto (Indonesia) Liliyana Natsir	21–23, 18–21	(silver) Runner-up

=== IBF International ===
Women's doubles
Year	Tournament	Partner	Opponent	Score	Result
1995	Norwegian International	(Denmark) Gitte Jansson	(Denmark) Pernille Harder (Denmark) Majken Vange	15–7, 15–12	(gold) Winner
1995	Irish International	(Denmark) Rikke Olsen	(Denmark) Pernille Harder (Denmark) Majken Vange	10–15, 15–4, 9–15	(silver) Runner-up
1996	Austrian International	(Denmark) Gitte Jansson	(Denmark) Pernille Harder (Denmark) Majken Vange	6–15, 12–15	(silver) Runner-up
1996	Norwegian International	(Denmark) Pernille Harder	(Sweden) Johanna Holgersson (Sweden) Jenny Karlsson	4–9, 9–0, 9–7, 9–8	(gold) Winner
1997	Irish International	(Denmark) Pernille Harder	(Denmark) Britta Andersen (Denmark) Christina Sørensen	15–2, 15–8	(gold) Winner
1998	Spanish International	(Denmark) Ann-Lou Jørgensen	(Canada) Julia Chen (Canada) Jennifer Wong	15–6, 15–1	(gold) Winner
1998	Scottish International	(Denmark) Ann-Lou Jørgensen	(England) Lorraine Cole (England) Tracy Dineen	15–2, 15–11	(gold) Winner
2003	Spanish International	(Denmark) Pernille Harder	(England) Ella Tripp (England) Joanne Wright	15–10, 12–15, 15–8	(gold) Winner

Mixed doubles
Year	Tournament	Partner	Opponent	Score	Result
1995	Austrian International	(Denmark) Janek Roos	(Germany) Bjoern Siegemund (Germany) Katrin Schmidt	7–15, 15–11, 10–15	(silver) Runner-up
1995	Czech International	(Denmark) Thomas Stavngaard	(Denmark) Janek Roos (Denmark) Pernille Harder	15–4, 4–15, 8–15	(silver) Runner-up
1995	Norwegian International	(Denmark) Janek Roos	(Denmark) Thomas Stavngaard (Denmark) Ann-Lou Jørgensen	12–15, 8–15	(silver) Runner-up
1998	Scottish International	(Denmark) Michael Lamp	(England) Ian Sullivan (England) Gail Emms	15–10, 11–15, 15–12	(gold) Winner
2006	Southern Pan Am International	(Denmark) Leon Aabenhus	(Canada) Mike Beres (Canada) Valérie Loker	21–12, 21–19	(gold) Winner
2006	Italian International	(Denmark) Peter Steffensen	(Russia) Vitalij Durkin (Russia) Valeria Sorokina	22–20, 21–12	(gold) Winner

== Record against selected opponents ==
Mixed doubles results with Jens Eriksen against Super Series finalists, world Semi-finalists, and Olympic quarter-finalists:

- (China) Chen Qiqiu & Zhao Tingting 4–1
- (China) Zhang Jun & Gao Ling 1–9
- (China) Xie Zhongbo & Zhang Yawen 1–2
- (Denmark) Thomas Laybourn & Kamilla Rytter Juhl 0–2
- (England) Simon Archer & Joanne Goode 1–1
- (England) Nathan Robertson & Gail Emms 2–1
- (Indonesia) Nova Widianto & Liliyana Natsir 1–0
- (South Korea) Kim Dong-moon & Ra Kyung-min 0–3
- (Poland) Robert Mateusiak & Nadieżda Zięba 1–0
- (Thailand) Sudket Prapakamol & Saralee Thungthongkam 0–3
