= Lena Frier Kristiansen =

Danish badminton player

Personal information
- Born: 12 March 1983 (age 43) Randers, Jutland, Denmark
- Height: 1.70 m (5 ft 7 in)
- Weight: 65 kg (143 lb)

Sport
- Country: Denmark
- Sport: Badminton
- Handedness: Right

Women's doubles
- Highest ranking: 8 (29 October 2009)
- BWF profile
Medal record
Representing Denmark
Women's badminton
European Championships
| Gold medal – first place | 2008 Herning | Women's doubles |
| Bronze medal – third place | 2006 Den Bosch | Women's doubles |
European Mixed Team Championships
| Gold medal – first place | 2009 Liverpool | Mixed team |
European Women's Team Championships
| Gold medal – first place | 2010 Warsaw | Women's team |
| Gold medal – first place | 2008 Almere | Women's team |
European Junior Championships
| Silver medal – second place | 2001 Spała | Mixed team |
| Bronze medal – third place | 2001 Spała | Mixed doubles |

Lena Frier Kristiansen (born 12 March 1983) is a badminton player from Denmark. In 2001, she won the silver and bronze medals at the European Junior Championships in the mixed team and doubles respectively. Partneres with Kamilla Rytter Juhl, they won the bronze medal the 2006 European Championships in the women's doubles event, and made it to the gold medal in 2008. They also competed at the 2008 Beijing Olympic Games, but was defeated in the first round by the Japanese pair Kumiko Ogura and Reiko Shiota in the rubber games.

== Achievements ==
=== European Championships ===
Women's doubles
| Year | Venue | Partner | Opponent | Score | Result |
|---|---|---|---|---|---|
| 2008 | Herning, Denmark | (Denmark) Kamilla Rytter Juhl | (England) Donna Kellogg (England) Gail Emms | 21–18, 21–18 | Gold |
| 2006 | Den Bosch, Netherlands | (Denmark) Kamilla Rytter Juhl | (Germany) Juliane Schenk (Germany) Nicole Grether | 21–9, 14–21, 15–21 | Bronze |

=== European Junior Championships ===
Mixed doubles
| Year | Venue | Partner | Opponent | Score | Result |
|---|---|---|---|---|---|
| 2001 | Spała, Poland | (Denmark) Peter Hasbak | (Denmark) Rasmus Andersen (Denmark) Mette Nielsen | 10–15, 5–15 | Bronze |

=== BWF Superseries ===
The BWF Superseries, launched on 14 December 2006 and implemented in 2007, is a series of elite badminton tournaments, sanctioned by Badminton World Federation (BWF). BWF Superseries has two levels: Superseries and Superseries Premier. A season of Superseries features twelve tournaments around the world, which introduced since 2011, with successful players invited to the Superseries Finals held at the year end.

Women's doubles
| Year | Tournament | Partner | Opponent | Score | Result |
|---|---|---|---|---|---|
| 2009 | World Superseries Finals | (Denmark) Kamilla Rytter Juhl | (Malaysia) Chin Eei Hui (Malaysia) Wong Pei Tty | 17–21, 14–21 | (silver) Runner-up |
| 2009 | Denmark Open | (Denmark) Kamilla Rytter Juhl | (China) Pan Pan (China) Zhang Yawen | 20–22, 21–18, 12–21 | (silver) Runner-up |

BWF Super Series Finals tournament
BWF Super Series Premier tournament
BWF Super Series tournament

=== BWF Grand Prix ===
The BWF Grand Prix has two levels, Grand Prix and Grand Prix Gold. It is a series of badminton tournaments sanctioned by the Badminton World Federation (BWF) since 2007. The World Badminton Grand Prix sanctioned by International Badminton Federation (IBF) since 1983.

Women's doubles
| Year | Tournament | Partner | Opponent | Score | Result |
|---|---|---|---|---|---|
| 2008 | Dutch Open | (Denmark) Kamilla Rytter Juhl | (Indonesia) Shendy Puspa Irawati (Indonesia) Meiliana Jauhari | 21–16, 25–23 | (gold) Winner |
| 2004 | Dutch Open | (Denmark) Kamilla Rytter Juhl | (Denmark) Pernille Harder (Denmark) Helle Nielsen | 15–12, 15–8 | (gold) Winner |

Mixed doubles
| Year | Tournament | Partner | Opponent | Score | Result |
|---|---|---|---|---|---|
| 2004 | Dutch Open | (Denmark) Peter Steffensen | (Denmark) Thomas Laybourn (Denmark) Kamilla Rytter Juhl | 11–15, 7–15 | (silver) Runner-up |

BWF Grand Prix Gold tournament
BWF Grand Prix tournament

=== BWF International Challenge/Series ===
Women's doubles
| Year | Tournament | Partner | Opponent | Score | Result |
|---|---|---|---|---|---|
| 2008 | Finnish International | (Denmark) Kamilla Rytter Juhl | (Russia) Ekaterina Ananina (Russia) Anastasia Russkikh | 21–17, 21–15 | (gold) Winner |
| 2006 | Dutch International | (Denmark) Kamilla Rytter Juhl | (Germany) Juliane Schenk (Germany) Nicole Grether | 8–21, 12–21 | (silver) Runner-up |
| 2004 | Dutch International | (Denmark) Kamilla Rytter Juhl | (Bulgaria) Petya Nedelcheva (Bulgaria) Neli Boteva | 10–15, 6–15 | (silver) Runner-up |
| 2002 | Portugal International | (Denmark) Kamilla Rytter Juhl | (Denmark) Lene Mørk (Denmark) Helle Nielsen | 2–7, 3–7, 0–7 | (silver) Runner-up |
| 2002 | Slovenian International | (Denmark) Karina Sørensen | (Russia) Ekaterina Ananina (Russia) Anastasia Russkikh | 7–11, 5–11 | (silver) Runner-up |
| 2001 | Irish International | (Denmark) Kamilla Rytter Juhl | (Denmark) Lene Mørk (Denmark) Helle Nielsen | 3–7, 3–7, 2–7 | (silver) Runner-up |

Mixed doubles
| Year | Tournament | Partner | Opponent | Score | Result |
|---|---|---|---|---|---|
| 2003 | Croatian International | (Denmark) Rasmus Andersen | (Denmark) Carsten Mogensen (Denmark) Kamilla Rytter Juhl | 2–11, 3–11 | (silver) Runner-up |

BWF International Challenge tournament
BWF International Series tournament
