= Ann-Lou Jørgensen =

Danish badminton player (born 1977)

Personal information
- Born: 12 June 1977 (age 49) Odder, Midtjylland, Denmark
- Height: 1.68 m (5 ft 6 in)
- Weight: 63 kg (139 lb)

Sport
- Country: Denmark
- Sport: Badminton
- Handedness: Right
- Event: Women's doubles

Women's doubles
- BWF profile
Medal record
Women's badminton
Representing Denmark
World Championships
Bronze medal – third place	2003 Birmingham	Women's doubles
Sudirman Cup
Bronze medal – third place	2001 Seville	Mixed team
Uber Cup
Silver medal – second place	2000 Kuala Lumpur	Women's team
European Championships
Gold medal – first place	2002 Malmö	Women's doubles
Silver medal – second place	2004 Geneva	Women's doubles
European Mixed Team Championships
Gold medal – first place	2002 Malmö	Mixed team
Gold medal – first place	2004 Geneva	Mixed team

Ann-Lou Jørgensen (born 12 June 1977) is a badminton player from Denmark.

== Career ==
Jørgensen competed in badminton at the 2004 Summer Olympics in women's doubles with partner Rikke Olsen. They had a bye in the first round and defeated Nicole Grether and Juliane Schenk of Germany in the second. In the quarterfinals, Jørgensen and Olsen lost to Huang Sui and Gao Ling of China 15–6, 15–7.

== Achievements ==
=== World Championships ===
Women's doubles
Year	Venue	Partner	Opponent	Score	Result
2003	National Indoor Arena, Birmingham, United Kingdom	(Denmark) Rikke Olsen	(China) Gao Ling (China) Huang Sui	2–15, 15–8, 7–15	Bronze

=== European Championships ===
Women's doubles
Year	Venue	Partner	Opponent	Score	Result
2002	Baltiska Hallen, Malmö, Sweden	(Denmark) Jane F. Bramsen	(Denmark) Pernille Harder (Denmark) Mette Schjoldager	7–4, 7–1, 7–5	Gold
2004	Queue d’Arve Sport Center, Geneva, Switzerland	(Denmark) Rikke Olsen	(Netherlands) Lotte Bruil (Netherlands) Mia Audina	10–15, 1–15	Silver

=== IBF World Grand Prix ===
The World Badminton Grand Prix sanctioned by International Badminton Federation (IBF) since 1983.

Women's doubles
Year	Tournament	Partner	Opponent	Score	Result
2001	Indonesia Open	(Denmark) Jane F. Bramsen	(Indonesia) Deyana Lomban (Indonesia) Vita Marissa	5–7, 3–7, 3–7	(silver) Runner-up
2001	Denmark Open	(Denmark) Mette Schjoldager	(Denmark) Helene Kirkegaard (Denmark) Rikke Olsen	2–7, 2–7, 3–7	(silver) Runner-up
2001	German Open	(Denmark) Mette Schjoldager	(Denmark) Helene Kirkegaard (Denmark) Rikke Olsen	0–7, 7–8, 0–7	(silver) Runner-up
2002	Dutch Open	(Denmark) Rikke Olsen	(Thailand) Sathinee Chankrachangwong (Thailand) Saralee Thungthongkam	11–3, 11–5	(gold) Winner
2002	German Open	(Denmark) Rikke Olsen	(Netherlands) Lotte Jonathans (Netherlands) Mia Audina	2–11, 2–11	(silver) Runner-up
2003	Korea Open	(Denmark) Rikke Olsen	(South Korea) Lee Kyung-won (South Korea) Ra Kyung-min	5–11, 5–11	(silver) Runner-up

Mixed doubles
Year	Tournament	Partner	Opponent	Score	Result
1997	Dutch Open	(Denmark) Jonas Rasmussen	(Denmark) Lars Paaske (Denmark) Jane F. Bramsen	15–12, 15–6	(gold) Winner
2001	German Open	(Denmark) Michael Lamp	(Denmark) Michael Sogaard (Denmark) Rikke Olsen	1–7, 4–7, 1–7	(silver) Runner-up

=== IBF International ===
Women's doubles
Year	Tournament	Partner	Opponent	Score	Result
1996	Malmo International	(Denmark) Pernille Harder	(Sweden) Maria Bengtsson (Sweden) Margit Borg	4–15, 7–15	(silver) Runner-up
1996	Czech International	(Denmark) Christina B. Sorensen	(Ukraine) Natalja Esipenko (Ukraine) Natalija Golovkina	15–14, 15–0	(gold) Winner
1998	Polish Open	(Denmark) Tine Baun	(Denmark) Jane F. Bramsen (Denmark) Christina B. Sorensen	15–5, 15–3	(gold) Winner
1998	Scottish International	(Denmark) Mette Schjoldager	(England) Lorraine Cole (England) Tracy Dineen	15–2, 15–11	(gold) Winner
1998	Spanish International	(Denmark) Mette Schjoldager	(Canada) Julia Chen (Canada) Jennifer Wong	15–6, 15–1	(gold) Winner
2002	BMW International	(Denmark) Rikke Olsen	(Netherlands) Lotte Jonathans (Netherlands) Mia Audina	11–5, 5–11, 8–11	(silver) Runner-up

Mixed doubles
Year	Tournament	Partner	Opponent	Score	Result
1995	Norwegian International	(Denmark) Thomas Stavngaard	(Denmark) Janek Roos (Denmark) Mette Schjoldager	15–12, 15–8	(gold) Winner
1996	Hamburg Cup	(Denmark) Jonas Rasmussen	(Netherlands) Dennis Lens (Netherlands) Erica Van Den Heuvel	8–15, 17–14, 15–11	(gold) Winner
1996	Czech International	(Denmark) Jonas Rasmussen	(France) Manuel Dubrulle (France) Sandrine Lefevre	15–2, 15–11	(gold) Winner
1996	Hungarian International	(Denmark) Jonas Rasmussen	(England) Ian Sullivan (England) Joanne Nicholas	15–5, 15–11	(gold) Winner
1996	Norwegian International	(Denmark) Jonas Rasmussen	(England) Julian Robertson (England) Gail Emms	6–9, 9–2, 5–9, 5–9	(silver) Runner-up
1996	Irish Open	(Denmark) Jonas Rasmussen	(Denmark) Jesper Larsen (Denmark) Majken Vange	10–15, 15–8, 9–15	(silver) Runner-up
1997	Amor Tournament	(Denmark) Jonas Rasmussen	(Netherlands) Quinten van Dalm (Netherlands) Nicole van Hooren	9–11, 3–9, 9–7, 9–7, 7–9	(silver) Runner-up
1998	Polish Open	(Denmark) Jesper Mikla	(Denmark) Lars Paaske (Denmark) Jane F. Bramsen	16–17, 15–4, 11–15	(silver) Runner-up
