= Nicole Grether =

German badminton player (born 1974)

Personal information
- Born: 17 October 1974 (age 52) Schopfheim, Baden-Württemberg, West Germany
- Height: 1.79 m (5 ft 10 in)
- Weight: 68 kg (150 lb)

Sport
- Country: Germany; Canada
- Sport: Badminton
- Handedness: Right

Women's
- Highest ranking: 30 (WS) 21 Jan 2010; 16 (WD) 7 Apr 2011; 228 (XD) 22 Oct 2009
- BWF profile
Medal record
Badminton
Representing Germany
European Championships
Silver medal – second place	2006 Den Bosch	Women's doubles
Bronze medal – third place	2004 Geneva	Women's doubles
Bronze medal – third place	2002 Malmö	Women's doubles
European Mixed Team Championships
Bronze medal – third place	2004 Geneva	Mixed team
European Women's Team Championships
Bronze medal – third place	2006 Thessalonica	Women's team
European Junior Championships
Bronze medal – third place	1993 Sofia	Girls' doubles

Nicole Grether (born 17 October 1974) is a badminton player from Germany. She competed at the 2000 Sydney and 2004 Athens Summer Olympics.

== Career ==
Grether competed in badminton at the 2004 Summer Olympics in women's doubles with partner Juliane Schenk. They defeated Michelle Edwards and Chantal Botts of South Africa in the first round but were defeated by Ann-Lou Jørgensen and Rikke Olsen of Denmark in the round of 16.

As of 2011, she now represents Canada with her partner Charmaine Reid. However, due to Grether still holding a German passport, the duo has been unable to compete as a Canadian team in a number of events. This issue has prevented the pair from qualifying to the 2012 Summer Olympics.

== Achievements ==
=== European Championships ===
Women's doubles
Year	Venue	Partner	Opponent	Score	Result
2006	Maaspoort Sports and Events; Den Bosch, Netherlands	(Germany) Juliane Schenk	(England) Donna Kellogg (England) Gail Emms	12–21, 10–21	Silver
2004	Queue d’Arve Sport Center; Geneva, Switzerland	(Germany) Juliane Schenk	(Denmark) Ann-Lou Jørgensen (Denmark) Rikke Olsen	12–15, 10–15	Bronze
2002	Baltiska hallen Malmö, Sweden	(Germany) Nicol Pitro	(Denmark) Pernille Harder (Denmark) Mette Schjoldager	1–7, 7–3, 4–7	Bronze

=== European Junior Championships ===
Girls' doubles
Year	Venue	Partner	Opponent	Score	Result
1993	Hristo Botev Hall; Sofia, Bulgaria	(Germany) Sandra Beißel	(Denmark) Rikke Olsen (Denmark) Mette Sørensen	4–15, 7–15	Bronze

=== BWF International Challenge/Series ===
Women's singles
Year	Tournament	Opponent	Score	Result
2013	Peru International	(Canada) Christin Tsai	11–21, 12–21	(silver) Runner-up
2012	Brazil International	(United States) Jamie Subandhi	21–17, 21–15	(gold) Winner
2012	Carebaco International	(Trinidad and Tobago) Solangel Guzman	21–7, 21–12	(gold) Winner
2012	Tahiti International	(Canada) Michelle Li	8–21, 13–21	(silver) Runner-up
2011	Mauritius International	(Canada) Charmaine Reid	21–10, 21–12	(gold) Winner
2011	Peru International	(United States) Rena Wang	19–21, 22–20, 9–17 Retired	(silver) Runner-up
2011	Iran Fajr International	(India) Dhanya Nair	21–12, 24–22	(gold) Winner
2010	Croatian International	(Japan) Kana Ito	11–21, 21–17, 24–22	(gold) Winner
2010	Guatemala International	(United States) Rena Wang	21–12, 21–13	(gold) Winner
2010	Brazil International	(Indonesia) Ana Rovita	23–25, 15–21	(silver) Runner-up
2010	Miami PanAm International	(Italy) Agnese Allegrini	16–21, 17–21	(silver) Runner-up

Women's doubles
Year	Tournament	Partner	Opponent	Score	Result
2014	Peru International	(Canada) Charmaine Reid	(United States) Eva Lee (United States) Paula Lynn Obanana	14–21, 15–21	(silver) Runner-up
2014	Brazil International	(Canada) Charmaine Reid	(Canada) Alex Bruce (Canada) Phyllis Chan	10–11, 11–10, 8–11, 5–11	(silver) Runner-up
2013	Brazil International	(Canada) Charmaine Reid	(Brazil) Thalita Correa (Brazil) Mariana Pedrol Freitas	21–11, 21–11	(gold) Winner
2013	Tahiti International	(Canada) Charmaine Reid	(New Zealand) Amanda Brown (New Zealand) Kritteka Gregory	21–4, 21–11	(gold) Winner
2013	Iran Fajr International	(Canada) Charmaine Reid	(Malaysia) Amelia Alicia Anscelly (Malaysia) Soong Fie Cho	18–21, 15–21	(silver) Runner-up
2012	Brazil International	(Canada) Charmaine Reid	(Peru) Camilla Garcia (Peru) Daniela Macias	21–6, 21–15	(gold) Winner
2012	Carebaco International	(Canada) Charmaine Reid	(Trinidad and Tobago) Virginia Chariandy (Trinidad and Tobago) Solangel Guzman	21–12, 21–11	(gold) Winner
2012	Peru International	(Canada) Charmaine Reid	(Canada) Alex Bruce (Canada) Michelle Li	18–21, 18–21	(silver) Runner-up
2011	Canadian International	(Canada) Charmaine Reid	(Canada) Alex Bruce (Canada) Michelle Li	10–21, 21–13, 16–21	(silver) Runner-up
2011	Bahrain International	(Canada) Charmaine Reid	(India) Aparna Balan (India) N. Siki Reddy	21–10, 21–19	(gold) Winner
2011	Czech International	(Canada) Charmaine Reid	(Russia) Valeri Sorokina (Russia) Nina Vislova	10–21, 16–21	(silver) Runner-up
2011	Mauritius International	(Canada) Charmaine Reid	(South Africa) Michelle Claire Edwards (South Africa) Annari Viljoen	21–10, 21–7	(gold) Winner
2011	Spanish Open	(Canada) Charmaine Reid	(Netherlands) Lotte Jonathans (Netherlands) Paulien van Dooremalen	21–12, 18–21, 14–21	(silver) Runner-up
2011	Iran Fajr International	(Canada) Charmaine Reid	(Sri Lanka) Achini Nimeshika Ratnasari (Sri Lanka) Upuli Weerasinghe	17–21, 20–22	(silver) Runner-up
2010	Croatian International	(Canada) Charmaine Reid	(Croatia) Staša Poznanović (Croatia) Mateja Čiča	21–11, 16–21, 21–10	(gold) Winner
2010	Canadian International	(Canada) Charmaine Reid	(Canada) Ruilin Huang (Malaysia) Lim Yee Theng	Walkover	(gold) Winner
2010	Peru International	(Canada) Charmaine Reid	(Peru) Christina Aicardi (Peru) Claudia Rivero	21–15, 21–10	(gold) Winner
2010	Tahiti International	(Canada) Charmaine Reid	(Australia) Leanne Choo (Australia) Kate Wilson-Smith	12–21, 21–19, 12–21	(silver) Runner-up
2010	Guatemala International	(Canada) Charmaine Reid	(Peru) Christina Aicardi (Peru) Claudia Rivero	21–4, 21–8	(gold) Winner
2010	Santo Domingo Open	(Canada) Charmaine Reid	(Canada) Valerie Jacques (Canada) Florence Lavoie	21–12, 21–13	(gold) Winner
2010	Puerto Rico International	(Canada) Charmaine Reid	(Peru) Christina Aicardi (Peru) Claudia Rivero	21–12, 21–9	(gold) Winner
2010	Miami PanAm International	(Canada) Charmaine Reid	(Mexico) Cynthia Gonzalez (Mexico) Victoria Montero	21–11, 21–12	(gold) Winner
2010	Bahrain International	(Canada) Charmaine Reid	(India) Dhanya Nair (India) Mohita Sahdev	23–21, 21–11	(gold) Winner
2009	Bulgarian International	(Canada) Charmaine Reid	(Bulgaria) Petya Nedelcheva (Russia) Anastasia Russkikh	11–21, 18–21	(silver) Runner-up
2008	Bahrain International	(Canada) Charmaine Reid	(India) Aparna Balan (India) Sampada Sahastrabuddhe	21–16, 21–13	(gold) Winner
2007	Turkey International	(Germany) Juliane Schenk	(Bulgaria) Diana Dimova (Bulgaria) Petya Nedelcheva	Walkover	(gold) Winner
2007	Spanish Open	(Germany) Juliane Schenk	(England) Natalie Munt (England) Joanne Nicholas	21–11, 20–22, 25–23	(gold) Winner

BWF International Challenge tournament
BWF International Series tournament
BWF Future Series tournament
