= Helle Nielsen (badminton) =

Danish badminton player (born 1981)

Personal information
- Born: 20 July 1981 (age 45) Brøndby, Denmark
- Height: 1.68 m (5 ft 6 in)

Sport
- Country: Denmark
- Sport: Badminton
- Handedness: Right

Women's & mixed doubles
- Highest ranking: 14 (WD)
- BWF profile
Medal record
Women's badminton
Representing Denmark
Sudirman Cup
Bronze medal – third place	2005 Beijing	Mixed team
European Championships
Bronze medal – third place	2008 Herning	Mixed doubles
European Mixed Team Championships
Gold medal – first place	2009 Liverpool	Mixed team
European Women's Team Championships
Gold medal – first place	2010 Warsaw	Women's team
Gold medal – first place	2008 Almere	Women's team
European Junior Championships
Silver medal – second place	1999 Glasgow	Girls' doubles
Bronze medal – third place	1999 Glasgow	Mixed doubles
Bronze medal – third place	1999 Glasgow	Mixed team

Helle Nielsen (born 20 July 1981) is a Danish badminton player. In 1999, she won a silver and two bronzes at the European Junior Badminton Championships in Glasgow, Scotland in the girls doubles, mixed doubles and mixed team respectively. In 2008, she won the bronze medal at the European Championships in mixed doubles with Carsten Mogensen.

== Achievements ==
=== European Championships ===
Mixed doubles
Year	Venue	Partner	Opponent	Score	Result
2008	Messecenter; Herning, Denmark	(Denmark) Carsten Mogensen	(England) Anthony Clark (England) Donna Kellogg	18–21, 19–21	Bronze

=== European Junior Championships ===
Mixed doubles
Year	Venue	Partner	Opponent	Score	Result
1999	Kelvin Hall; Glasgow, Scotland	(Denmark) Karina Sørensen	(Germany) Petra Overzier (Germany) Anne Hönscheid	2–15, 15–8, 9–15	Silver

Mixed doubles
Year	Venue	Partner	Opponent	Score	Result
1999	Kelvin Hall; Glasgow, Scotland	(Denmark) Jonas Glyager Jensen	(Germany) Sebastian Schmidt (Germany) Anne Hönscheid	15–9, 10–15, 6–15	Bronze

=== BWF Grand Prix ===
The BWF Grand Prix has two level such as Grand Prix and Grand Prix Gold. It is a series of badminton tournaments, sanctioned by Badminton World Federation (BWF) since 2007.

Women's doubles
Year	Tournament	Partner	Opponent	Score	Result
2009	Bitburger Open	(Denmark) Marie Røpke	(Denmark) Line Damkjær Kruse (Denmark) Mie Schjoett-Kristensen	18–21, 21–19, 21–19	(gold) Winner
2008	Bitburger Open	(Denmark) Marie Røpke	(Indonesia) Shendy Puspa Irawati (Indonesia) Meiliana Jauhari	21–15, 21–18	(gold) Winner
2004	Dutch Open	(Denmark) Pernille Harder	(Denmark) Lena Frier Kristiansen (Denmark) Kamilla Rytter Juhl	12–15, 8–15	(silver) Runner-up

Mixed doubles
Year	Tournament	Partner	Opponent	Score	Result
2005	Denmark Open	(Denmark) Lars Paaske	(Denmark) Thomas Laybourn (Denmark) Kamilla Rytter Juhl	8–15, 9–15	(silver) Runner-up

BWF Grand Prix Gold tournament
BWF Grand Prix tournament

=== BWF International Challenge/Series ===
Women's doubles
Year	Tournament	Partner	Opponent	Score	Result
2010	Swedish International Stockholm	(Denmark) Marie Røpke	(Netherlands) Lotte Jonathans (Netherlands) Paulien van Dooremalen	17–21, 21–15, 21–18	(gold) Winner
2009	Norwegian International	(Denmark) Marie Røpke	(Netherlands) Samantha Barning (Netherlands) Eefje Muskens	21–13, 21–18	(gold) Winner
2008	Irish International	(Denmark) Marie Røpke	(Netherlands) Patty Stolzenbach (Netherlands) Paulien van Dooremalen	23–25, 21–17, 21–8	(gold) Winner
2008	Czech International	(Denmark) Marie Røpke	(Belgium) Séverine Corvilain (Belgium) Nathalie Descamps	21–14, 21–15	(gold) Winner
2004	Irish International	(Denmark) Pernille Harder	(Malaysia) Chor Hooi Yee (Malaysia) Lim Pek Siah	15–7, 15–6	(gold) Winner
2003	Dutch International	(Denmark) Majken Vange	(Russia) Elena Sukhareva (Russia) Natalya Gorodnicheva	11–4, 11–8	(gold) Winner
2003	Portugal International	(Denmark) Julie Houmann	(England) Ella Tripp (England) Joanne Wright	11–1, 3–11, 11–3	(gold) Winner
2002	Le Volant d'Or de Toulouse	(Denmark) Majken Vange	(Japan) Akiko Nakashima (Japan) Chihiro Ohsaka	6–11, 10–13	(silver) Runner-up
2002	Austrian International	(Denmark) Lene Mørk	(Russia) Marina Yakusheva (Russia) Elena Shimko	7–4, 7–0, 7–5	(gold) Winner
2002	Portugal International	(Denmark) Lene Mørk	(Denmark) Kamilla Rytter Juhl (Denmark) Lena Frier Kristiansen	7–2, 7–3, 7–0	(gold) Winner
2001	Irish International	(Denmark) Lene Mørk	(Denmark) Kamilla Rytter Juhl (Denmark) Lena Frier Kristiansen	7–3, 7–3, 7–2	(gold) Winner

Mixed doubles
Year	Tournament	Partner	Opponent	Score	Result
2008	Czech International	(Denmark) Rasmus Bonde	(Denmark) Mikkel Delbo Larsen (Denmark) Mie Schjøtt-Kristensen	21–12, 21–11	(gold) Winner
2008	Dutch International	(Denmark) Rasmus Bonde	(Denmark) Jacob Chemnitz (Denmark) Marie Røpke	21–15, 21–12	(gold) Winner
2004	Croatian International	(Denmark) Rasmus Andersen	(France) Svetoslav Stoyanov (France) Victoria Wright	12–15, 17–15	(gold) Winner
2003	Dutch International	(Denmark) Peter Steffensen	(Denmark) Jonas Glyager Jensen (Denmark) Majken Vange	11–9, 11–6	(gold) Winner
2003	Portugal International	(Denmark) Carsten Mogensen	(Sweden) Fredrik Bergström (Sweden) Johanna Persson	13–10, 5–11, 7–11	(silver) Runner-up
2002	Austrian International	(Denmark) Kasper Kiim Jensen	(Netherlands) Dennis Lens (Sweden) Johanna Persson	8–6, 7–8, 4–7, 6–8	(silver) Runner-up
2001	Irish International	(Denmark) Bo Rafn	(Scotland) Robert Blair (England) Natalie Munt	4–7, 7–3, 1–7, 5–7	(silver) Runner-up

BWF International Challenge tournament
BWF International Series tournament
