= Jane F. Bramsen =

Danish badminton player (born 1978)

Jane Bramsen
Personal information
- Born: 9 October 1978 (age 48)
- Height: 1.76 m (5 ft 9 in)

Sport
- Country: Denmark
- Sport: Badminton
- Handedness: Right
- BWF profile
Medal record
Women's badminton
Representing Denmark
European Championships
Gold medal – first place	2002 Malmö	Women's doubles
European Mixed Team Championships
Gold medal – first place	2002 Malmö	Mixed team
European Junior Championships
Gold medal – first place	1997 Nymburk	Girls' doubles
Gold medal – first place	1997 Nymburk	Mixed team
Silver medal – second place	1997 Nymburk	Mixed doubles

Jane F. Bramsen (born 10 September 1978) is a badminton player from Denmark.

== Career ==
Bramsen won the gold medal at the 2002 European Badminton Championships in women's doubles with Ann-Lou Jørgensen.

== Achievements ==
=== European Championships ===
Women's doubles
Year	Venue	Partner	Opponent	Score	Result
2002	Baltiska Hallen; Malmö, Sweden	(Denmark) Ann-Lou Jørgensen	(Denmark) Pernille Harder (Denmark) Mette Schjoldager	7–4, 7–1, 7–5	Gold

=== European Junior Championships ===
Girls' doubles
Year	Venue	Partner	Opponent	Score	Result
1997	Nymburk, Czech Republic	(Denmark) Lene Mørk	(Denmark) Jane Jacoby (Denmark) Britta Andersen	17–15, 15–11	Gold

Mixed doubles
Year	Venue	Partner	Opponent	Score	Result
1997	Nymburk, Czech Republic	(Denmark) Kristian Langbak	(Denmark) Ove Svejstrup (Denmark) Britta Andersen	10–15, 12–15	Silver

=== IBF World Grand Prix ===
The World Badminton Grand Prix was sanctioned by the International Badminton Federation from 1983 to 2006.

Women's doubles
Year	Tournament	Partner	Opponent	Score	Result
2000	Swedish Open	(Denmark) Pernille Harder	(Japan) Yoshiko Iwata (Japan) Haruko Matsuda	15–12, 17–15	(gold) Winner
2001	Indonesia Open	(Denmark) Ann-Lou Jørgensen	(Indonesia) Deyana Lomban (Indonesia) Vita Marissa	5–7, 3–7, 3–7	(silver) Runner-up

Mixed doubles
Year	Tournament	Partner	Opponent	Score	Result
1997	Dutch Open	(Denmark) Lars Paaske	(Denmark) Jonas Rasmussen (Denmark) Ann-Lou Jorgensen	12–15, 6–15	(silver) Runner-up
1999	German Open	(Denmark) Lars Paaske	(Denmark) Janek Roos (Denmark) Marlene Thomsen	15–10, 15–11	(gold) Winner
1999	U.S. Open	(Denmark) Jonas Rasmussen	(Denmark) Michael Lamp (Denmark) Pernille Harder	15–3, 15–10	(gold) Winner
2000	Swedish Open	(Denmark) Jonas Rasmussen	(Sweden) Fredrik Bergström (Sweden) Jenny Karlsson	15–6, 17–14	(gold) Winner
2000	U.S. Open	(Denmark) Jonas Rasmussen	(England) Ian Sullivan (England) Gail Emms	8–15, 15–11, 15–12	(gold) Winner
2000	German Open	(Denmark) Jonas Rasmussen	(England) Ian Sullivan (England) Gail Emms	15–3, 7–15, 15–4	(gold) Winner
2002	Swiss Open	(Denmark) Jonas Rasmussen	(South Korea) Kim Dong-moon (South Korea) Ra Kyung-min	3–7, 5–7, 1–7	(silver) Runner-up

=== IBF International ===
Women's doubles
Year	Tournament	Partner	Opponent	Score	Result
1997	Norwegian International	(Denmark) Christina B. Sorensen	(England) Gail Emms (England) Rebecca Pantaney	9–5, 9–6, 9–2	(gold) Winner
1997	Iceland International	(Denmark) Christina B. Sorensen	(Iceland) Aslaug Hinriksdottir (Iceland) Brynja Petursdottir	15–1, 15–5	(gold) Winner
1998	Polish Open	(Denmark) Christina B. Sorensen	(Denmark) Ann-Lou Jørgensen (Denmark) Tine Baun	5–15, 3–15	(silver) Runner-up

Mixed doubles
Year	Tournament	Partner	Opponent	Score	Result
1997	Norwegian International	(Denmark) Steen Thygesen-Poulsen	(Sweden) Fredrik Bergström (Sweden) Jenny Karlsson	9–3, 5–9, 9–6, 9–4	(gold) Winner
1997	Iceland International	(Denmark) Joachim Fischer Nielsen	(Sweden) Tómas Viborg (Iceland) Erla Björg Hafsteinsdóttir	15–5, 15–2	(gold) Winner
1997	Scottish Open	(Denmark) Lars Paaske	(Scotland) Russell Hogg (England) Tracy Hutchinson	15–6, 15–2	(gold) Winner
1998	Polish Open	(Denmark) Lars Paaske	(Denmark) Jesper Mikla (Denmark) Ann-Lou Jorgensen	17–16, 4–15, 15–11	(gold) Winner
1998	Norwegian International	(Denmark) Lars Paaske	(Sweden) Fredrik Bergström (Sweden) Jenny Karlsson	8–15, 15–10, 15–5	(gold) Winner
