= Peter Steffensen =

Danish badminton player

Personal information
- Born: Peter Buur Steffensen; 4 December 1979 (age 46) West Jutland, Denmark
- Height: 180 cm (5 ft 11 in)

Sport
- Country: Denmark
- Sport: Badminton
- Handedness: Left

Doubles
- Highest ranking: 10 (XD, 2006)
- BWF profile

Peter Buur Steffensen (born 4 December 1979) is a Danish retired badminton player.

== Career ==
Steffensen was born and raised in a town in western Jutland near Herning. He has lived in Copenhagen since 2001 and has a professional academic background in Pedagogy. As a player, Peter was playing professionally from 2001 to 2009 on the Danish National Badminton Team, where he played doubles alongside Jonas Rasmussen, Mathias Boe and Thomas Laybourn winning several international titles in Europe in Sweden, Greece and the Netherlands. He won two Danish youth titles in 2001, including the Croatia International. In 2002 he won at the Iceland International and the 2003 Dutch International. In 2005 he represented Denmark at the IBF World Championships in the United States. In 2006 he was successful at the International in Italy, Bulgaria and Finland, managing to position itself as number 10 in the world. In 2008 he won at the Swedish International in Stockholm. He currently serves as a Coach for several of the Danish Badminton clubs, having training experience at Lillerød and KBK Copenhagen, where he served as the Senior Head Coach for the first division.

== Achievements ==
=== IBF Grand Prix ===
The World Badminton Grand Prix sanctioned by International Badminton Federation (IBF) from 1983 to 2006.

Men's doubles
Year	Tournament	Partner	Opponent	Score	Result
2004	Dutch Open	(Denmark) Thomas Laybourn	(United States) Tony Gunawan (United States) Howard Bach	8–15, 7–15	(silver) Runner-up

Mixed doubles
Year	Tournament	Partner	Opponent	Score	Result
2004	Dutch Open	(Denmark) Lena Frier Kristiansen	(Denmark) Thomas Laybourn (Denmark) Kamilla Rytter Juhl	11–15, 7–15	(silver) Runner-up

=== IBF International ===
Men's doubles
Year	Tournament	Partner	Opponent	Score	Result
2008	Swedish International	(Denmark) Rasmus Andersen	(Belgium) Frédéric Mawet (Belgium) Wouter Claes	21–12, 21–16	(gold) Winner
2006	Bulgarian International	(Denmark) Rasmus Andersen	(Russia) Andrej Ashmarin (Russia) Anton Nazarenko	21–12, 21–17	(gold) Winner
2006	Finnish Open	(Denmark) Jonas Rasmussen	(Sweden) Joakim Andersson (China) Zhang Yi	21–9, 21–10	(gold) Winner
2002	Iceland International	(Denmark) Dennis Jensen	(Denmark) Bo Rafn (Denmark) Michael Christensen	Walkover	(gold) Winner
2000	Slovenian International	(Denmark) Kristian Langbak	(Denmark) Mathias Boe (Denmark) Michael Jensen	Walkover	(silver) Runner-up

Mixed doubles
Year	Tournament	Partner	Opponent	Score	Result
2008	Swedish International	(Denmark) Julie Houmann	(Denmark) Mads Pieler Kolding (Denmark) Line Damkjær Kruse	21–8, 21–17	(gold) Winner
2006	Italian International	(Denmark) Mette Schjoldager	(Russia) Vitalij Durkin (Russia) Valeria Sorokina	22–20, 21–12	(gold) Winner
2003	Dutch International	(Denmark) Helle Nielsen	(Denmark) Jonas Glyager Jensen (Denmark) Majken Vange	11–9, 11–6	(gold) Winner
2002	Iceland International	(Denmark) Karina Sørensen	(Denmark) Dennis Jensen (Denmark) Stine Borgström	Walkover	(gold) Winner
2001	Austrian International	(Denmark) Lene Mørk	(Denmark) Mathias Boe (Denmark) Britta Andersen	2–15, 5–15	(silver) Runner-up
2001	French Open International	(Denmark) Lene Mørk	(Netherlands) Chris Bruil (Netherlands) Lotte Jonathans	0–7, 2–7, 1–7	(silver) Runner-up
2001	Croatian International	(Denmark) Lene Mørk	(Denmark) Kristian Langbak (Denmark) Britta Andersen	15–10, 15–10	(gold) Winner
1999	Scottish International	(Denmark) Lene Mørk	(Denmark) Kristian Langbak (Denmark) Britta Andersen	9–15, 15–10, 9–15	(silver) Runner-up
1998	Hungarian International	(Denmark) Lene Mørk	(Denmark) Martin Bruun (Denmark) Sara Runesten	11–15, 3–15	(silver) Runner-up

BWF International Challenge tournament
BWF International Series tournament
BWF Future Series tournament
