= Britta Andersen =

Danish badminton player

Personal information
- Born: 19 December 1979 (age 46) Aarhus, Denmark
- Height: 1.68 m (5 ft 6 in)

Sport
- Country: Denmark
- Sport: Badminton
- Handedness: Right
- Event: Doubles
Medal record
Women's badminton
Representing Denmark
World Junior Championships
Bronze medal – third place	1996 Silkeborg	Girls' doubles
European Junior Championships
Gold medal – first place	1997 Nymburk	Mixed doubles
Gold medal – first place	1997 Nymburk	Mixed team
Silver medal – second place	1997 Nymburk	Girls' doubles

Britta Andersen (born 19 December 1979) is a Danish badminton player. She was born to a Philippine mother and Danish father.

== Achievements ==
=== World Junior Championships ===
Girls' doubles
Year	Venue	Partner	Opponent	Score	Result
1996	Silkeborg Hallerne; Silkeborg, Denmark	(Denmark) Jane Jacoby	(China) Lu Ying (China) Zhan Xubin	7–15, 12–15	Bronze

=== European Junior Championships ===
Girls' doubles
Year	Venue	Partner	Opponent	Score	Result
1997	Nymburk, Czech Republic	(Denmark) Jane Jacoby	(Denmark) Lene Mørk (Denmark) Jane F. Bramsen	15–17, 11–15	Silver

Mixed doubles
Year	Venue	Partner	Opponent	Score	Result
1997	Nymburk, Czech Republic	(Denmark) Ove Svejstrup	(Denmark) Kristian Langbak (Denmark) Jane F. Bramsen	15–10, 15–12	Gold

=== IBF Grand Prix ===
The World Badminton Grand Prix sanctioned by International Badminton Federation since 1983.

Women's doubles
Year	Tournament	Partner	Opponent	Score	Result
2000	Polish Open	(Denmark) Lene Mørk	(Japan) Yoshiko Iwata (Japan) Haruko Matsuda	4–15, 10–15	(silver) Runner-up

Mixed doubles
Year	Tournament	Partner	Opponent	Score	Result
2006	Malaysia Open	(Denmark) Jonas Rasmussen	(China) Zhang Jun (China) Gao Ling	21–19, 14–21, 15–21	(silver) Runner-up

=== BWF International Challenge/Series/European Circuit ===
Women's doubles
Year	Tournament	Partner	Opponent	Score	Result
2004	Czech International	(Denmark) Mie Schjøtt-Kristensen	(Czech Republic) Markéta Koudelková (Czech Republic) Hana Procházková	15–5, 15–11	(gold) Winner
2001	Austrian International	(Denmark) Lene Mørk	(Russia) Ella Karachkova (Russia) Anastasia Russkikh	15–12, 7–15, 16–17	(silver) Runner-up
2001	Croatian International	(Denmark) Lene Mørk	(Netherlands) Erica van den Heuvel (Netherlands) Nicole van Hooren	9–15, 12–15	(silver) Runner-up
2000	Slovenian International	(Denmark) Lene Mørk	(Denmark) Julie Houmann (Denmark) Anne Marie Pedersen	15–8, 15–8	(gold) Winner
2000	Czech International	(Denmark) Lene Mørk	(Germany) Petra Overzier (Germany) Kathrin Piotrowski	17–14, 15–8	(gold) Winner
2000	Romanian International	(Denmark) Lene Mørk	(Austria) Verena Fastenbauer (Austria) Karina Lengauer	15–5, 15–1	(gold) Winner
2000	Portugal International	(Denmark) Lene Mørk	(England) Joanne Davies (England) Sara Hardaker	15–12, 15–12	(gold) Winner
1999	BMW International	(Denmark) Lene Mørk	(Germany) Katja Michalowsky (Germany) Karen Stechmann	15–10, 15–9	(gold) Winner
1998	Hungarian International	(Denmark) Lene Mørk	(Denmark) Rikke Broen (Denmark) Sara Runesten	3–15, 8–15	(silver) Runner-up
1998	Amor International	(Denmark) Lene Mørk	(Netherlands) Lotte Jonathans (Netherlands) Nicole van Hooren	6–15, 3–15	(silver) Runner-up
1997	Irish International	(Denmark) Christina Sørensen	(Denmark) Pernille Harder (Denmark) Mette Schjoldager	2–15, 8–15	(silver) Runner-up

Mixed doubles
Year	Tournament	Partner	Opponent	Score	Result
2010	Irish International	(Denmark) Christian John Skovgaard	(England) Chris Adcock (Scotland) Imogen Bankier	13–21, 11–21	(silver) Runner-up
2010	Swedish International	(Denmark) Mads Pieler Kolding	(Ukraine) Valeriy Atrashchenkov (Ukraine) Elena Prus	18–21, 21–18, 21–17	(gold) Winner
2009	Le Volant d'Or de Toulouse	(Denmark) Rasmus Bonde	(Poland) Robert Mateusiak (Poland) Nadieżda Kostiuczyk	10–21, 11–21	(silver) Runner-up
2008	Irish International	(Denmark) Kasper Faust Henriksen	(Denmark) Jacob Chemnitz (Denmark) Marie Røpke	21–17, 17–21, 15–21	(silver) Runner-up
2007	Spanish Open	(Denmark) Joachim Fischer Nielsen	(Germany) Ingo Kindervater (Germany) Kathrin Piotrowski	22–24, 22–20, 23–21	(gold) Winner
2006	Finnish International	(Denmark) Jonas Rasmussen	(Denmark) Rasmus Bonde (Denmark) Christinna Pedersen	21–11, 21–15	(gold) Winner
2004	Bitburger International	(Denmark) Rasmus Andersen	(France) Svetoslav Stoyanov (France) Pi Hongyan	15–2, 15–12	(gold) Winner
2004	Czech International	(Denmark) Jesper Thomsen	(Germany) Johannes Schöttler (Germany) Gitte Köhler	15–1, 15–0	(gold) Winner
2004	Austrian International	(Denmark) Jesper Thomsen	(Germany) Björn Siegemund (Germany) Nicol Pitro	15–3, 15–17, 15–8	(gold) Winner
2004	Dutch International	(Denmark) Tommy Sørensen	(France) Svetoslav Stoyanov (France) Victoria Wright	15–8, 8–15, 8–15	(silver) Runner-up
2001	Austrian International	(Denmark) Mathias Boe	(Denmark) Peter Steffensen (Denmark) Lene Mørk	15–2, 15–5	(gold) Winner
2001	Croatian International	(Denmark) Kristian Langbak	(Denmark) Peter Steffensen (Denmark) Lene Mørk	10–15, 10–15	(silver) Runner-up
2000	Slovenian International	(Denmark) Mathias Boe	(Scotland) Russell Hogg (Scotland) Kirsteen McEwan	15–9, 15–3	(gold) Winner
2000	Czech International	(Denmark) Mathias Boe	(Denmark) Jonas Glyager Jensen (Denmark) Lene Mørk	16–17, 15–7, 15–7	(gold) Winner
2000	Romanian International	(Denmark) Mathias Boe	(Denmark) Michael Jensen (Denmark) Lene Mørk	15–7, 15–8	(gold) Winner
1999	Scottish International	(Denmark) Kristian Langbak	(Denmark) Peter Steffensen (Denmark) Lene Mørk	15–9, 10–15, 15–9	(gold) Winner
1999	Norwegian International	(Denmark) Ove Svejstrup	(South Korea) Kim Yong-hyun (South Korea) Yim Kyung-jin	15–9, 8–15, 9–15	(silver) Runner-up

BWF International Challenge tournament
BWF International Series tournament
