= 1997 European Junior Badminton Championships =

Tournament details
- Dates: 30 March – 5 April 1997
- Edition: 15th
- Location: Nymburk, Czech Republic

The 1997 European Junior Badminton Championships were the 15th tournament of the European Junior Badminton Championships. It was held in Nymburk, Czech Republic, from 30 March to 5 April 1997. Dutch players won both the singles events; while Danish players dominated all three doubles disciplines. Denmark also won the mixed team title.

== Medalists ==
Event	Gold	Silver	Bronze
Boys' singles	(Netherlands) Dicky Palyama	(Wales) Richard Vaughan	(Russia) Nikolaj Nikolaenko
Boys' singles	(Netherlands) Dicky Palyama	(Wales) Richard Vaughan	(Denmark) Kasper Ødum
Girls' singles	(Netherlands) Judith Meulendijks	(Denmark) Tine Rasmussen	(Russia) Ella Karachkova
Girls' singles	(Netherlands) Judith Meulendijks	(Denmark) Tine Rasmussen	(England) Donna Kellogg
Boys' doubles	(Denmark) Kasper Ødum (Denmark) Ove Svejstrup	(Denmark) Kristian Langbak (Denmark) Frederik Køhler	(Sweden) Johan Holm (Sweden) Patrik Isaksson
Boys' doubles	(Denmark) Kasper Ødum (Denmark) Ove Svejstrup	(Denmark) Kristian Langbak (Denmark) Frederik Køhler	(Germany) Joachim Tesche (Germany) Thomas Tesche
Girls' doubles	(Denmark) Lene Mørk (Denmark) Jane F. Bramsen	(Denmark) Jane Jacoby (Denmark) Britta Andersen	(Russia) Maria Kool (Russia) Maria Sofronova
Girls' doubles	(Denmark) Lene Mørk (Denmark) Jane F. Bramsen	(Denmark) Jane Jacoby (Denmark) Britta Andersen	(Russia) Zhanna Chornenjkaja (Russia) Ella Karachkova
Mixed doubles	(Denmark) Ove Svejstrup (Denmark) Britta Andersen	(Denmark) Kristian Langbak (Denmark) Jane F. Bramsen	(Denmark) Kasper Ødum (Denmark) Lene Mørk
Mixed doubles	(Denmark) Ove Svejstrup (Denmark) Britta Andersen	(Denmark) Kristian Langbak (Denmark) Jane F. Bramsen	(England) David Lindley (England) Donna Kellogg
Team event	Denmark; Henrik K. Hansen; Frederik Køhler; Kristian Langbak; Kasper Ødum; Ove Svejstrup; Britta Andersen; Jane F. Bramsen; Jane Jacoby; Lene Mørk; Tine Rasmussen	Russia; Mikhail Kelj; Nikolaj Nikolaenko; Alexandr Remizov; Zhanna Chornenkaja; Ella Karachkova; Maria Kool; Maria Sofronova	Netherlands; Stacey Bouwman; Rune Massing; Dicky Palyama; Loes Cuppen; Judith Meulendijks; Melissa Trouerbach; Ginny Severien

== Results ==
=== Semi-finals ===
Category	Winner	Runner-up	Score
Boys' singles	(Wales) Richard Vaughan	(Denmark) Kasper Ødum	15–6, 17–18, 15–8
Boys' singles	(Netherlands) Dicky Palyama	(Russia) Nikolaj Nikolaenko	15–6, 15–4
Girls' singles	(Netherlands) Judith Meulendijks	(Russia) Ella Karachkova	11–7, 11–4
Girls' singles	(Denmark) Tine Rasmussen	(England) Donna Kellogg	3–11, 11–5, 12–9
Boys' doubles	(Denmark) Kasper Ødum (Denmark) Ove Svejstrup	(Sweden) Johan Holm (Sweden) Patrik Isaksson	15–8, 15–9
Boys' doubles	(Denmark) Frederik Köhler (Denmark) Kristian Langbak	(Germany) Joachim Tesche (Germany) Thomas Tesche	15–6, 15–4
Girls' doubles	(Denmark) Britta Andersen (Denmark) Jane Jacoby	(Russia) Ella Karachkova (Russia) Zhanna Chornenjkaja	15–6, 15–12
Girls' doubles	(Denmark) Jane F. Bramsen (Denmark) Lene Mørk	(Russia) Maria Kool (Russia) Maria Sofronova	15–12, 15–12
Mixed doubles	(Denmark) Ove Svejstrup (Denmark) Britta Andersen	(Denmark) Kasper Ødum (Denmark) Lene Mørk	15–1, 15–10
Mixed doubles	(Denmark) Kristian Langbak (Denmark) Jane Bramsen	(England) David Lindley (England) Donna Kellogg	15–9, 15–9

=== Finals ===
Category	Winners	Runners-up	Score
Boys' singles	(Netherlands) Dicky Palyama	(Wales) Richard Vaughan	11–15, 15–11, 18–15
Girls' singles	(Netherlands) Judith Meulendijks	(Denmark) Tine Rasmussen	6–11, 12–9, 11–6
Boys' doubles	(Denmark) Kasper Ødum (Denmark) Ove Svejstrup	(Denmark) Frederik Köhler (Denmark) Kristian Langbak	15–7, 15–6
Girls' doubles	(Denmark) Jane F. Bramsen (Denmark) Lene Mørk	(Denmark) Britta Andersen (Denmark) Jane Jacoby	17–15, 15–11
Mixed doubles	(Denmark) Ove Svejstrup (Denmark) Britta Andersen	(Denmark) Kristian Langbak (Denmark) Jane F. Bramsen	15–10, 15–12

== Medal table ==
Rank	Nation	Gold	Silver	Bronze	Total
1	Denmark (DEN)	4	4	2	10
2	Netherlands (NED)	2	0	1	3
3	Russia (RUS)	0	1	4	5
4	Wales (WAL)	0	1	0	1
5	England (ENG)	0	0	2	2
6	Germany (GER)	0	0	1	1
6	Sweden (SWE)	0	0	1	1
Totals (7 entries)		6	6	11	23
