= Haruko Matsuda =

Japanese badminton player

Personal information
- Born: 11 January 1972 (age 54) Kumamoto Prefecture, Japan
- Height: 1.59 m (5 ft 3 in)
- Weight: 52 kg (115 lb)

Sport
- Country: Japan
- Sport: Badminton
- Handedness: Right
- Event: Women's & mixed doubles

Women's & mixed doubles
- BWF profile
Medal record
Women's badminton
Representing Japan
Asian Games
Bronze medal – third place	1998 Bangkok	Women's team

Haruko Matsuda (松田 治子, Matsuda Haruko; born 11 January 1972) is a former Japanese badminton player. Matsuda graduated from the Kumamoto Chuo High School. The Fujitsu player, competed at the Summer Olympics in Sydney, Australia. Matsuda won the National Championships in the mixed doubles event in 1991 and 1995; and in the women's doubles event in 1996 and 1998.

== Achievements ==
=== IBF World Grand Prix ===
The World Badminton Grand Prix sanctioned by International Badminton Federation (IBF) since 1983.

Women's doubles
Year	Tournament	Partner	Opponent	Score	Result	Ref.
1997	Chinese Taipei Open	(Japan) Yoshiko Iwata	(South Korea) Park Soo-yun (South Korea) Yim Kyung-jin	2–15, 8–15	(silver) Runner-up	
1997	U.S. Open	(Japan) Yoshiko Iwata	(China) Qin Yiyuan (China) Tang Yongshu	6–15, 2–15	(silver) Runner-up	
1997	Denmark Open	(Japan) Yoshiko Iwata	(Denmark) Ann Jørgensen (Denmark) Majken Vange	16–18, 5–15	(silver) Runner-up	
2000	Swedish Open	(Japan) Yoshiko Iwata	(Denmark) Jane F. Bramsen (Denmark) Pernille Harder	12–15, 15–17	(silver) Runner-up	
2000	Polish Open	(Japan) Yoshiko Iwata	(Denmark) Britta Andersen (Denmark) Lene Mørk	15–4, 15–10	(gold) Winner	
2000	German Open	(Japan) Yoshiko Iwata	(China) Lu Ying (China) Huang Sui	5–15, 3–15	(silver) Runner-up	

=== IBF International ===
Mixed doubles
Year	Tournament	Partner	Opponent	Score	Result	Ref.
2000	Australia Capital International	(Japan) Yuzo Kubota	(Hong Kong) Albertus Susanto Njoto (Hong Kong) Chan Mei Mei	9–15, 13–15	(silver) Runner-up	
