= Kathrin Piotrowski =

German badminton player (born 1980)

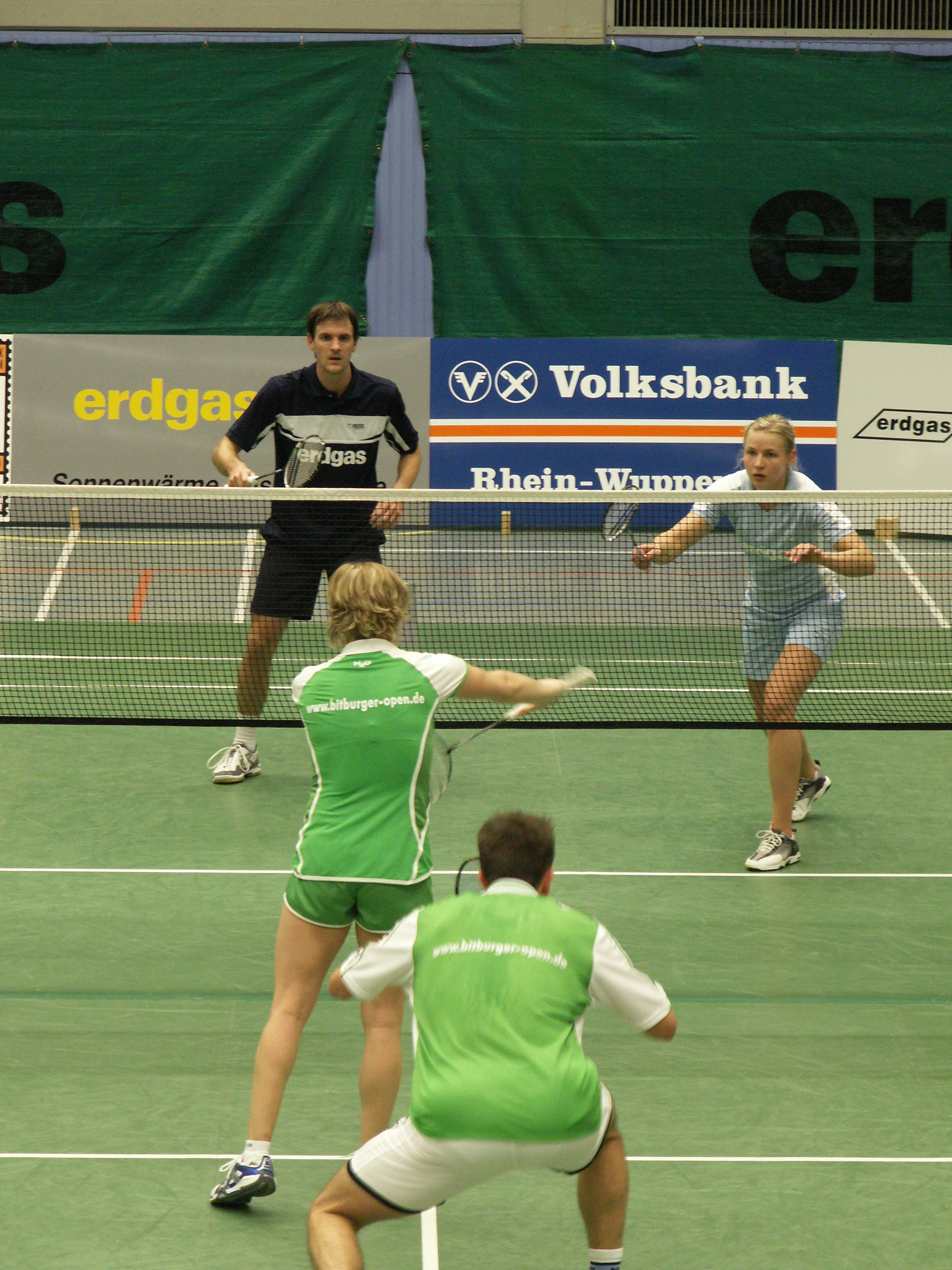

Personal information
- Born: 17 April 1980 (age 46)
- Height: 1.62 m (5 ft 4 in)

Sport
- Country: Germany
- Sport: Badminton
- Handedness: Right

Doubles
- Highest ranking: 10 (XD, in 2006)
- BWF profile
Medal record
Women's badminton
Representing Germany
Uber Cup
Bronze medal – third place	2006 Sendai & Tokyo	Women's team
Bronze medal – third place	2008 Jakarta	Women's team
European Women's Team Championships
Bronze medal – third place	2008 Almere	Women's team
Bronze medal – third place	2006 Thessalonica	Women's team
European Junior Championships
Gold medal – first place	1999 Glasgow	Mixed team

Kathrin Piotrowski (born 17 April 1980) is a German retired badminton player. At the age of 16, she was one of the youngest Bundesliga players ever. She has won five German championship titles and five international titles on her account. She also has three German team championships to her name and 2 medals at the European Men's and Women's team Championships & Uber Cup. She has also played for her country in World Championships.

== Achievements ==
=== IBF World Grand Prix ===
The World Badminton Grand Prix sanctioned by International Badminton Federation (IBF) since 1983 to 2006.

Men's doubles
Year	Tournament	Partner	Opponent	Score	Result
2006	Dutch Open	(Germany) Michaela Peiffer	(Indonesia) Rani Mundiasti (Indonesia) Endang Nursugianti	16–21, 16–21	(silver) Runner-up

Mixed doubles
Year	Tournament	Partner	Opponent	Score	Result
2005	Dutch Open	(Germany) Ingo Kindervater	(Poland) Robert Mateusiak (Poland) Nadieżda Kostiuczyk	5–15, 5–15	(silver) Runner-up

=== IBF/BWF International ===
Women's doubles
Year	Tournament	Partner	Opponent	Score	Result
2000	Czech International	(Germany) Petra Overzier	(Denmark) Britta Andersen (Denmark) Lene Mørk	14–17, 8–15	(silver) Runner-up
2005	Portugal International	(Germany) Sandra Marinello	(Bulgaria) Petya Nedelcheva (Scotland) Yuan Wemyss	8–15, 15–11, 15–2	(gold) Winner
2005	Finnish International	(Germany) Sandra Marinello	(Netherlands) Brenda Beenhakker (Netherlands) Paulien van Dooremalen	15–11, 15–1	(gold) Winner
2006	Austrian International	(Germany) Sandra Marinello	(Indonesia) Atu Rosalina (Switzerland) Cynthia Tuwankotta	21–11, 19–21, 17–21	(silver) Runner-up

Mixed doubles
Year	Tournament	Partner	Opponent	Score	Result
2000	German BMW International	(Germany) Kristof Hopp	(Germany) Michael Keck (Netherlands) Erica van den Heuvel	7–15, 15–9, 8–15	(silver) Runner-up
2003	Mauritius International	(Germany) Kristof Hopp	(Japan) Tadashi Ōtsuka (Japan) Shizuka Yamamoto	15–10, 7–15, 7–15	(silver) Runner-up
2004	Swedish International	(Germany) Kristof Hopp	(Russia) Nikolai Zuyev (Russia) Marina Yakusheva	5–15, 15–13, 15–11	(gold) Winner
2004	Portugal International	(Germany) Kristof Hopp	(England) Simon Archer (England) Donna Kellogg	12–15, 12–15	(silver) Runner-up
2005	Dutch International	(Germany) Ingo Kindervater	(Sweden) Fredrik Bergström (Sweden) Johanna Persson	4–15, 13–15	(silver) Runner-up
2006	Austrian International	(Germany) Ingo Kindervater	(Germany) Tim Dettmann (Germany) Sandra Marinello	21–17, 22–20	(gold) Winner
2007	Spanish International	(Germany) Ingo Kindervater	(Denmark) Joachim Fischer Nielsen (Denmark) Britta Andersen	24–22, 20–22, 21–23	(silver) Runner-up
2007	Le Volant d'Or de Toulouse	(Germany) Ingo Kindervater	(Germany) Kristof Hopp (Germany) Birgit Overzier	21–12, 16–21, 21–14	(gold) Winner
2007	Turkey International	(Germany) Ingo Kindervater	(Germany) Kristof Hopp (Germany) Birgit Overzier	21–18, 21–15	(gold) Winner
2007	Belgian International	(Germany) Ingo Kindervater	(England) Chris Langridge (England) Joanne Nicholas	17–21, 21–15, 23–25	(silver) Runner-up

BWF International Challenge tournament
BWF International Series tournament
