= Ella Diehl =

Russian badminton player (born 1978)

Ella Diehl Элла Диль
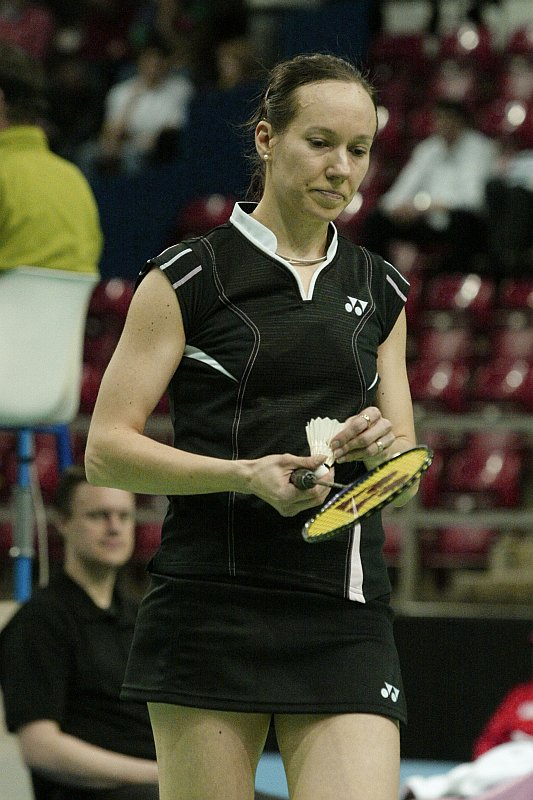

Personal information
- Born: Ella Aleksandrovna Karachkova; 5 August 1978 (age 48) Kuybyshev, Russian SFSR, USSR
- Height: 1.75 m (5 ft 9 in)
- Weight: 67 kg (148 lb)

Sport
- Country: Russia
- Sport: Badminton
- Handedness: Right

Women's singles
- Highest ranking: 9 (2 December 2010)
- BWF profile
Medal record
Women's badminton
Representing Russia
European Championships
Bronze medal – third place	2010 Manchester	Women's singles
European Mixed Team Championships
Bronze medal – third place	2011 Amsterdam	Mixed team
Bronze medal – third place	2013 Moscow	Mixed team
European Women's Team Championships
Silver medal – second place	2010 Warsaw	Women's team
Silver medal – second place	2014 Basel	Women's team
European Junior Championships
Silver medal – second place	1995 Nitra	Girls' doubles
Silver medal – second place	1997 Nymburk	Mixed team
Bronze medal – third place	1997 Nymburk	Girls' singles
Bronze medal – third place	1997 Nymburk	Girls' doubles

Ella Aleksandrovna Diehl (Russian: Элла Александровна Диль; born 5 August 1978; née Karachkova; Russian: Карачкова) is a badminton player from Russia.

== Career ==
Diehl was selected to join the national team in 1995. She had won girls' doubles silver medal at the 1995 European Junior Championships, and also one silver and two bronze in 1997 in team, girls' singles and doubles respectively.

In her home country Russia, Diehl has won 14 national titles as of 2009. In 2000 and 2008, she competed at the Summer Olympics.

Diehl played at the 2005 World Championships in Anaheim, United States. In the women's singles event she reached the second round before losing to Salakjit Ponsana of Thailand.

In October 2005, Diehl won the women's doubles event at the Scottish International Open in Glasgow, and two weeks later followed this up by winning the women's singles event at the Irish International in Lisburn. The next year she won the Irish International again.

In 2010, Diehl won the bronze medal at the European Individual Championships in Manchester, and in June 2010, claimed the European Tour circuit finals title, beating Susan Egelstaff in the final in three sets. 2010 also saw Diehl beat current world champion Lu Lan of China to reach the semi-final of Swiss Open.

== Achievements ==
=== European Championships ===
Women's singles
Year	Venue	Opponent	Score	Result
2010	Manchester Evening News Arena; Manchester, England	(Denmark) Tine Rasmussen	14–21, 16–21	Bronze

=== European Junior Championships ===
Girls' singles
Year	Venue	Opponent	Score	Result
1997	Nymburk, Czech Republic	(Netherlands) Judith Meulendijks	7–11, 4–11	Bronze

Girls' doubles
Year	Venue	Partner	Opponent	Score	Result
1995	Športová hala Olympia; Nitra, Slovakia	(Russia) Natalia Djachkova	(England) Donna Kellogg (England) Joanne Wright	7–15, 13–18	Silver
1997	Nymburk, Czech Republic	(Russia) Zhanna Chornenjkaja	(Denmark) Britta Andersen (Denmark) Jane Jacoby	6–15, 12–15	Bronze

=== BWF Grand Prix ===
The BWF Grand Prix had two levels, the Grand Prix and Grand Prix Gold. It was a series of badminton tournaments sanctioned by the Badminton World Federation (BWF) and played between 2007 and 2017. The World Badminton Grand Prix was sanctioned by the International Badminton Federation from 1983 to 2006.

Women's singles
Year	Tournament	Opponent	Score	Result
2005	Russian Open	(Russia) Nina Vislova	4–11, 11–5, 4–11	(silver) Runner-up
2006	U.S. Open	(United States) Lee Joo-hyun	11-6 Retired	(gold) Winner
2006	Bulgaria Open	(Bulgaria) Petya Nedelcheva	21–19, 19–21, 16-21	(silver) Runner-up
2008	Russian Open	(Ukraine) Larisa Griga	21–10, 17–21, 21–12	(gold) Winner
2009	Russian Open	(Russia) Tatjana Bibik	21–17, 16–21, 21–11	(gold) Winner
2010	Russian Open	(Japan) Ayane Kurihara	19–21, 19-21	(silver) Runner-up

Women's doubles
Year	Tournament	Partner	Opponent	Score	Result
2006	U.S. Open	(Russia) Marina Yakusheva	(Russia) Valeria Sorokina (Russia) Nina Vislova	15–21, 18–21	(silver) Runner-up

BWF Grand Prix Gold tournament
BWF Grand Prix tournament

=== BWF International Challenge/Series ===
Women's singles
Year	Tournament	Opponent	Score	Result
1998	Portugal International	(England) Tanya Woodward	11–4, 1–11, 6–11	(silver) Runner-up
1998	Czech International	(France) Sandra Dimbour	11–9, 11–7	(gold) Winner
1998	Slovak International	(Czech Republic) Markéta Koudelková	11–2, 11–3	(gold) Winner
1999	Austrian International	(Netherlands) Ginny Severien	11–4, 11–4	(gold) Winner
1999	Portugal International	(Scotland) Sonya McGinn	11–5, 13–10	(gold) Winner
1999	Welsh International	(Russia) Marina Yakusheva	3–11, 7–11	(silver) Runner-up
2000	La Chaux-de-Fonds International	(Slovenia) Maja Pohar	11–4, 11–2	(gold) Winner
2000	Russian International	(Ukraine) Elena Nozdran	11–8, 11–8	(gold) Winner
2003	Welsh International	(Scotland) Susan Hughes	11–6, 11–5	(gold) Winner
2004	Portugal International	(England) Tracey Hallam	11–7, 4–11, 9–11	(silver) Runner-up
2004	Le Volant d'Or de Toulouse	(Sweden) Sara Persson	7–11, 13–10, 11–3	(gold) Winner
2004	Russian International	(Russia) Tatjana Bibik	11–5, 11–6	(gold) Winner
2005	Polish International	(Bulgaria) Petya Nedelcheva	9–11, 7–11	(silver) Runner-up
2005	Spanish International	(Denmark) Nanna Brosolat Jensen	11–4, 11–1	(gold) Winner
2005	Scottish International	(Netherlands) Judith Meulendijks	11–6, 11–8	(gold) Winner
2005	Irish International	(Germany) Juliane Schenk	11–3, 11–8	(gold) Winner
2006	Le Volant d'Or de Toulouse	(Russia) Ekaterina Ananina	23–21, 21–16	(gold) Winner
2006	Belgian International	(Germany) Petra Overzier	16–21, 16–21	(silver) Runner-up
2006	Scotland International	(Bulgaria) Petya Nedelcheva	21–18, 7–21, 21–18	(gold) Winner
2006	Italian International	(Sweden) Sara Persson	12–21, 11–21	(silver) Runner-up
2008	Czech International	(Netherlands) Judith Meulendijks	21–14, 21–13	(gold) Winner
2009	Le Volant d'Or de Toulouse	(England) Jill Pittard	21–8, 21–13	(gold) Winner
2009	White Nights	(Ukraine) Elena Prus	21–10, 21–10	(gold) Winner
2009	Scottish International	(Scotland) Susan Egelstaff	18–21, 10–21	(silver) Runner-up
2010	European Circuit Finals	(Scotland) Susan Egelstaff	20–22, 21–13, 21–16	(gold) Winner
2013	Portugal International	(Russia) Ksenia Polikarpova	16–21, 21–16, 21–19	(gold) Winner
2013	White Nights	(Germany) Olga Konon	17–21, 14–21	(silver) Runner-up

Women's doubles
Year	Tournament	Partner	Opponent	Score	Result
1996	Amor International	(Russia) Nadezhda Chervyakova	(Russia) Elena Sukhareva (Russia) Marina Yakusheva	7–15, 5–15	(silver) Runner-up
2000	Russian International	(Russia) Anastasia Russkikh	(Russia) Irina Ruslyakova (Russia) Marina Yakusheva	8–15, 10–15	(silver) Runner-up
2001	Austrian International	(Russia) Anastasia Russkikh	(Denmark) Britta Andersen (Denmark) Lene Mørk	12–15, 15–7, 17–16	(gold) Winner
2003	Welsh International	(Russia) Anastasia Russkikh	(France) Laura Choinet (France) Perrine Le Buhanic	15–1, 15–4	(gold) Winner
2005	Italian International	(Russia) Marina Yakusheva	(Russia) Valeria Sorokina (Russia) Nina Vislova	15–2, 8–15, 5–15	(silver) Runner-up

Mixed doubles
Year	Tournament	Partner	Opponent	Score	Result
2000	La Chaux-de-Fonds International	(France) Pavel Uvarov	(Slovenia) Andrej Pohar (Slovenia) Maja Pohar	15–8, 15–5	(gold) Winner
2005	Spanish International	(France) Jean-Michel Lefort	(Scotland) Andrew Bowman (Scotland) Kirsteen McEwan	15–3, 15–9	(gold) Winner

BWF International Challenge tournament
BWF International Series tournament

== Personal life ==
On 23 June 2007, in Germany, Karachkova married the Swiss junior badminton team coach, Rainer Diehl of Germany, whom she met in 2000. She lives with her husband in Yverdon, Switzerland. There is a child from the first marriage. On 11 October 2011, the duo had a daughter, Lea.
