= Swedish Masters International Badminton Championships =

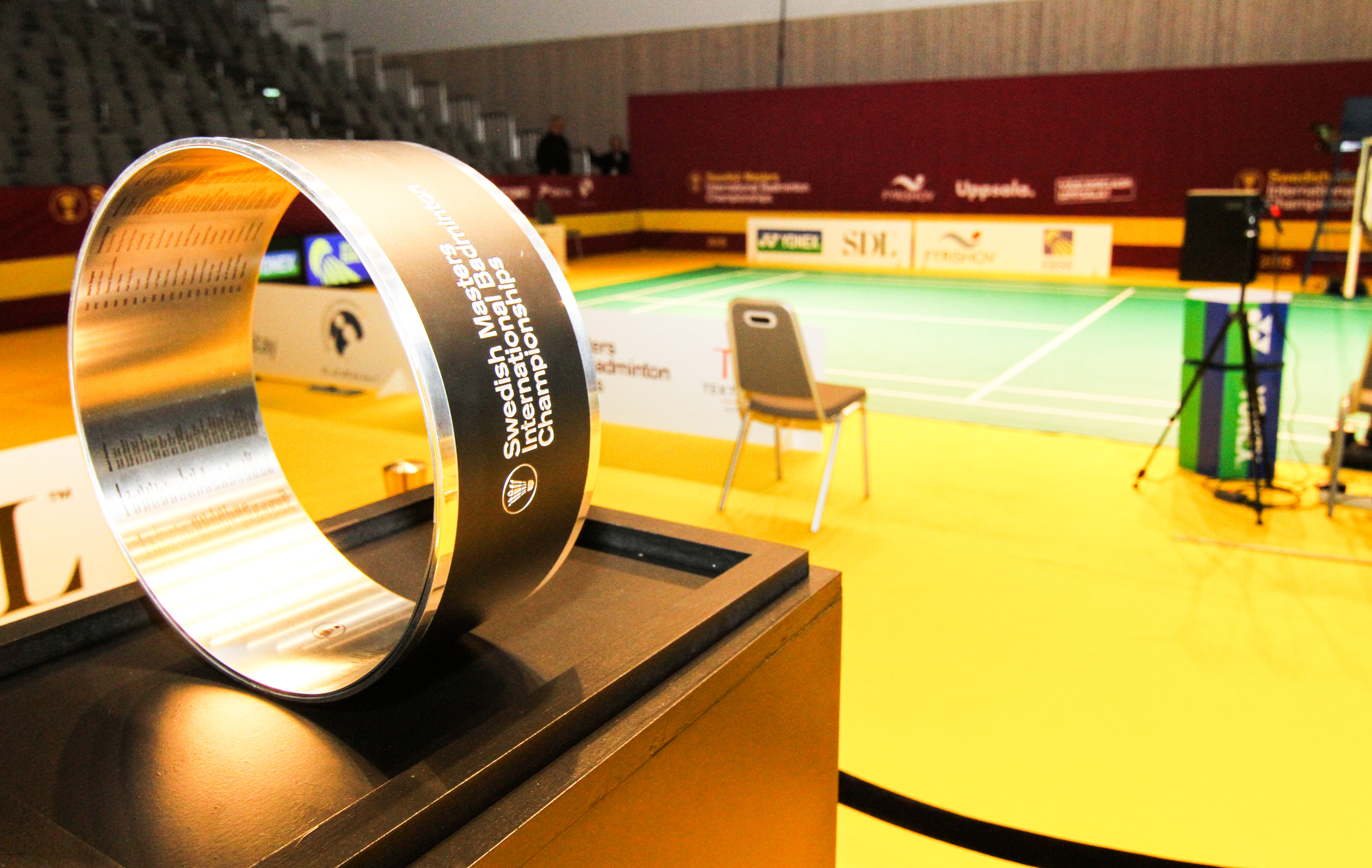
- Swedish Masters Trophy was played for during the tournaments time in Uppsala between 2014-2016
- Status: active
- Genre: sports event
- Frequency: annual
- Location: various
- Country: Sweden
- Inaugurated: 2004
- Organiser: Badminton Sweden

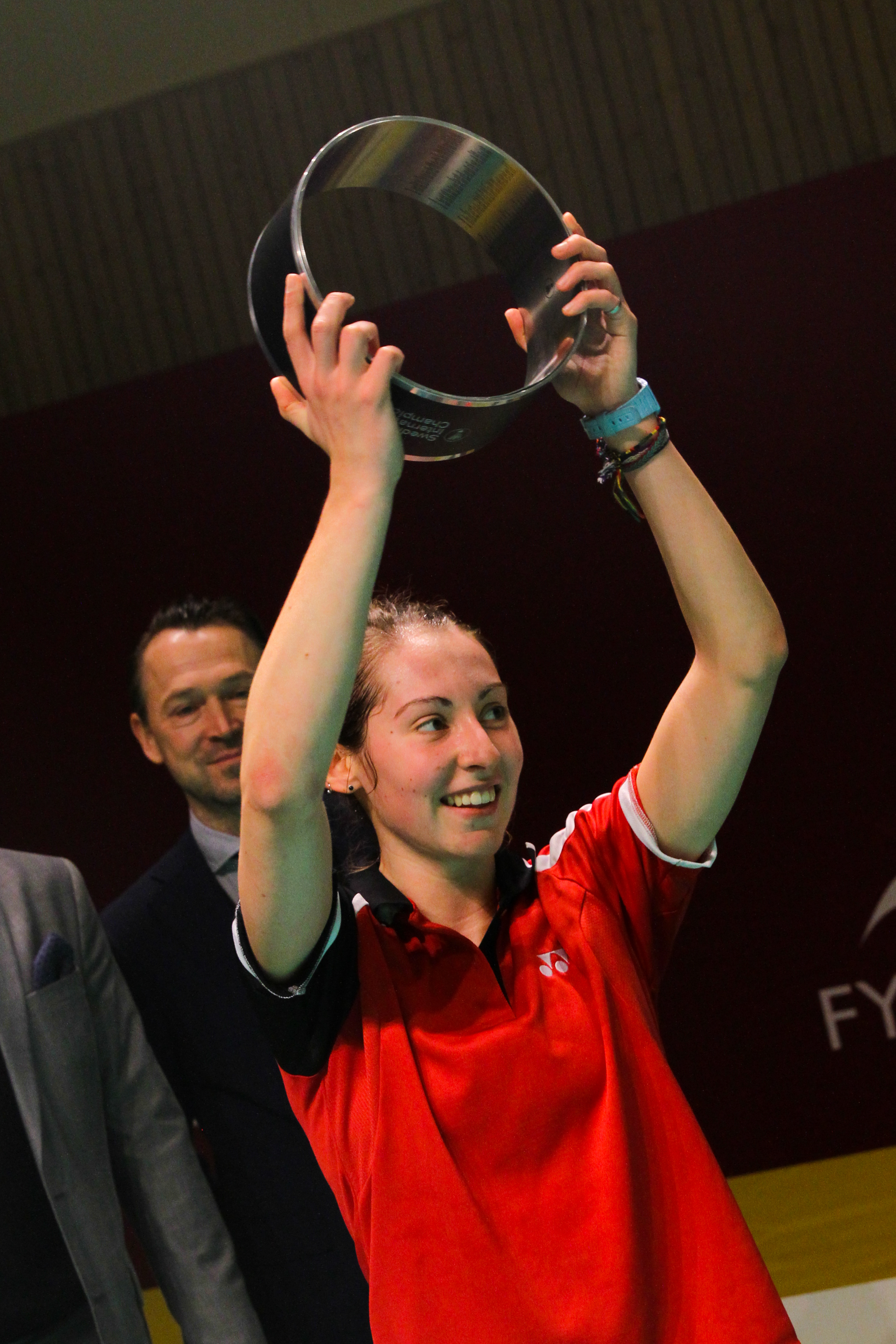
Kirsty Gilmour (Scotland), two times winner in 2014 and 2015

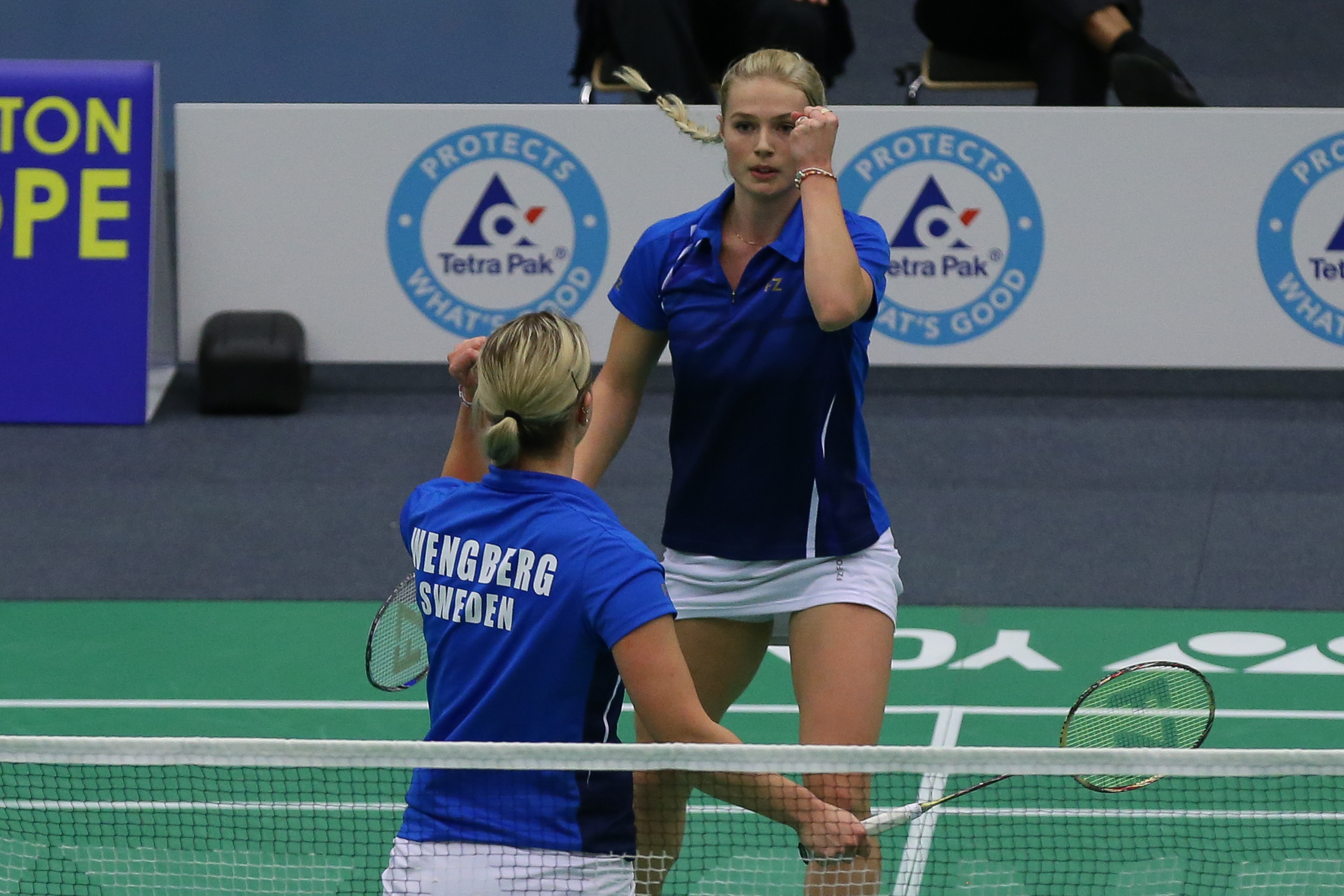
Emma Wengberg & Clara Nistad winning on home soil for Sweden in 2017

Swedish Masters International Badminton Championships or Swedish International Stockholm is an annual badminton tournament held in Sweden and hosted by Svenska Badmintonförbundet. It is part of the European Badminton Circuit. The tournament was started by Stockholms Badmintonförbund in 2004. Stockholms Badmintonförbund was running the tournament until 2008 and was handed over to Svenska Badmintonförbundet. The tournament was played in Sweden's capital Stockholm up until the 2013 edition. In 2014 the tournament moved to Uppsala, about 1 hour north of Stockholm, and was run by former Swedish player Pär-Gunnar Jönsson. The 2016 edition represented the first BE International Challenge circuit tournament with the new increased prize money from US$15,000 to US$17,000, and will reach $25,000 by 2018. The Swedish Masters tournament also has one of the most unusual tournament trophies, in a circular shape representing the ring on the cork of the shuttle, with all the names of previous winners engraved on the inside.

In 2017 the tournament went back to an International Series from its previous position as an International Challenge and moved to a new home in Lund, just north of Malmo. The tournament also reverted to its original name of Swedish International from the previous three editions as the Swedish Masters.

In 2018 the tournament will revert to the name of Swedish Open (badminton), as used between 1956 and 2000. The tournament will be hosted in Lund as an International Series.

== Past winners ==
Year	Men's singles	Women's singles	Men's doubles	Women's doubles	Mixed doubles	Ref
2004	(Japan) Shōji Satō	(Denmark) Tine Rasmussen	(Poland) Michał Łogosz (Poland) Robert Mateusiak	(Poland) Kamila Augustyn (Poland) Nadieżda Kostiuczyk	(Germany) Kristof Hopp (Germany) Kathrin Piotrowski	
2005	(Russia) Evgenij Isakov	(England) Elizabeth Cann	(England) Simon Archer (England) Anthony Clark	(Japan) Miyuki Tai (Japan) Noriko Okuma	(Russia) Nikolai Zuev (Russia) Marina Yakusheva	
2006	(Denmark) Joachim Persson	(Denmark) Tine Rasmussen	(Germany) Michael Fuchs (Germany) Roman Spitko	(Sweden) Johanna Persson (Sweden) Elin Bergblom	(Indonesia) Imam Sodikin Irawan (Switzerland) Cynthia Tuwankotta	
2007	(Japan) Kenichi Tago	(China) Li Wenyan	(Sweden) Imam Sodikin (Sweden) Imanuel Hirschfeld	(China) Guo Xin (China) Cai Jiani	(Denmark) Rasmus Bonde (Denmark) Christinna Pedersen	
2008	(Germany) Marc Zwiebler	(China) Li Wenyan	(Denmark) Rasmus Mangor Andersen (Denmark) Peter Steffensen	(China) Yu Qi (China) Cai Jiani	(Denmark) Peter Steffensen (Denmark) Julie Houmann	
2009	(Denmark) Jan Ø. Jørgensen	(Japan) Yu Hirayama	(Japan) Naoki Kawamae (Japan) Shōji Satō	(Netherlands) Rachel van Cutsen (Netherlands) Paulien van Dooremalen	(Ukraine) Valeriy Atrashchenkov (Ukraine) Elena Prus	
2010	(Indonesia) Indra Bagus Ade Chandra	(Japan) Kaori Imabeppu	(England) Chris Langridge (England) Robin Middleton	(Denmark) Helle Nielsen (Denmark) Marie Røpke	(Denmark) Mads Pieler Kolding (Denmark) Britta Andersen	
2011	(Spain) Pablo Abián	(Japan) Kaori Imabeppu	(Denmark) Kim Astrup (Denmark) Rasmus Fladberg	(Denmark) Line Damkjær Kruse (Denmark) Marie Røpke	(England) Robin Middleton (England) Heather Olver	
2012	(Hong Kong) Chan Yan Kit	(France) Pi Hongyan	(Russia) Vladimir Ivanov (Russia) Ivan Sozonov	(England) Mariana Agathangelou (England) Heather Olver	(England) Nathan Robertson (England) Jenny Wallwork	
2013	(Japan) Kento Momota	(Spain) Carolina Marín	(Netherlands) Jacco Arends (Netherlands) Jelle Maas	(Netherlands) Selena Piek (Netherlands) Iris Tabeling	(Germany) Peter Käsbauer (Germany) Isabel Herttrich	
2014	(Finland) Ville Lang	(Scotland) Kirsty Gilmour	(Poland) Adam Cwalina (Poland) Przemysław Wacha	(Netherlands) Eefje Muskens (Netherlands) Selena Piek	(Scotland) Robert Blair (Scotland) Imogen Bankier	
2015	(England) Rajiv Ouseph	(Scotland) Kirsty Gilmour	(Denmark) Kim Astrup (Denmark) Anders Skaarup Rasmussen	(Russia) Anastasia Chervaykova (Russia) Nina Vislova	(Netherlands) Jacco Arends (Netherlands) Selena Piek	
2016	(Denmark) Anders Antonsen	(Germany) Karin Schnaase	(Denmark) Mathias Christiansen (Denmark) David Daugaard	(Denmark) Maiken Fruergaard (Denmark) Sara Thygesen	(Poland) Robert Mateusiak (Poland) Nadieżda Zięba	
2017	(England) Toby Penty	(Denmark) Mia Blichfeldt	(Russia) Konstantin Abramov (Russia) Alexandr Zinchenko	(Sweden) Clara Nistad (Sweden) Emma Wengberg	(Denmark) Mikkel Mikkelsen (Denmark) Mai Surrow	

== Performances by nation ==
Top Nations
Pos	Nation	MS	WS	MD	WD	XD	Total
1	Denmark	3	3	4	3	4	17
2	Japan	3	3	1	1		8
3	England	2	1	2	1	2	8
4	Germany	1	1	1		2	5
4	Netherlands			1	3	1	5
4	Russia	1		2	1	1	5
7	China		2		2		4
7	Poland			2	1	1	4
9	Scotland		2			1	3
9	Sweden			1	2		3
11	Spain	1	1				2
12	Indonesia	1				0.5	1.5
13	Finland	1					1
13	France		1				1
13	Hong Kong	1					1
13	Ukraine					1	1
17	Switzerland					0.5	0.5
Total		14	14	14	14	14	70
