= Kasper Ødum =

Danish badminton player (born 1979)

Personal information
- Born: 17 March 1979 (age 47)
- Height: 1.93 m (6 ft 4 in)

Sport
- Country: Denmark
- Sport: Badminton
- Handedness: Right
- Event: Men's singles

Men's singles
- BWF profile
Medal record
Men's badminton
Representing Denmark
European Junior Championships
Gold medal – first place	1997 Nymburk	Boys' doubles
Gold medal – first place	1995 Nitra	Mixed team
Gold medal – first place	1997 Nymburk	Mixed team
Bronze medal – third place	1995 Nitra	Boys' singles
Bronze medal – third place	1997 Nymburk	Boys' singles
Bronze medal – third place	1997 Nymburk	Mixed doubles

Kasper Ødum (born 17 March 1979) is a Danish badminton player.

== Career ==
=== Titles ===
In 1999 he won the Bulgarian International, in 2000 the Austrian International, in 2003 the Polish Open, in 2005 the Bitburger Open International, and in 2006 the Southern PanAm International, the Belgian International and the Bulgarian Open.
