= Lotte Jonathans =

Dutch badminton player (born 1977)

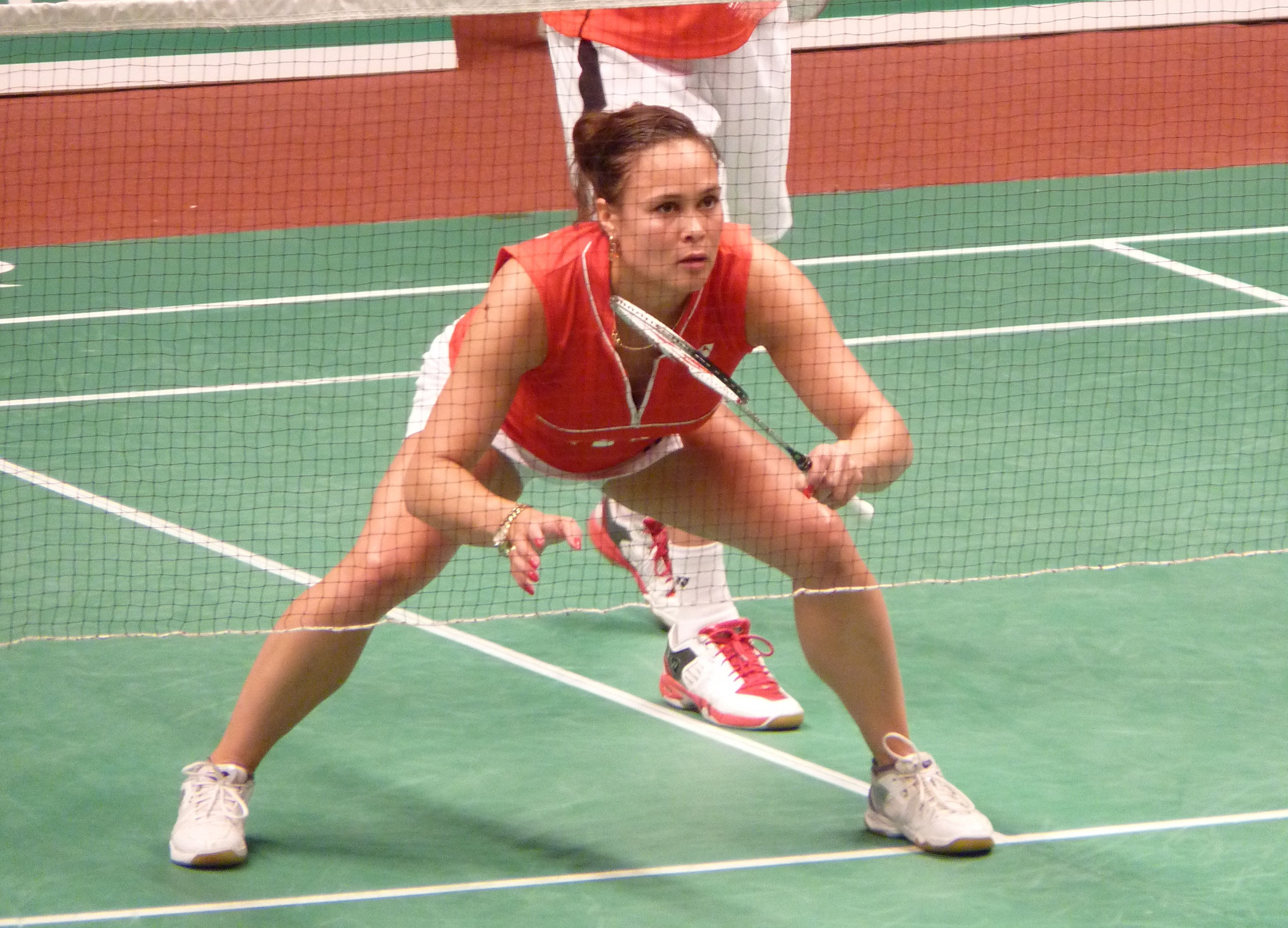

Personal information
- Born: 17 September 1977 (age 49) Den Bosch, Netherlands

Sport
- Country: Netherlands
- Sport: Badminton
- Handedness: Left

Women's & mixed doubles
- Highest ranking: 10 (WD 2 December 2010); 62 (XD 26 May 2011)
- BWF profile
Medal record
Women's badminton
Representing Netherlands
Uber Cup
Silver medal – second place	2006 Tokyo	Women's team
Bronze medal – third place	2002 Guangzhou	Women's team
European Championships
Gold medal – first place	2004 Geneva	Women's doubles
European Mixed Team Championships
Silver medal – second place	2004 Geneva	Mixed team
Silver medal – second place	2006 Den Bosch	Mixed team
Bronze medal – third place	2002 Malmö	Mixed team
European Women's Team Championships
Gold medal – first place	2006 Thessalonica	Women's team

Lotte Jonathans (born 17 September 1977) is a Dutch former badminton player.

== Career ==
Jonathans made her debut at the Olympics in the 2000 Sydney, reaching the quarter finals of the women's doubles with Nicole van Hooren.

Jonathans made her second appearance at the Olympics in the 2004 Athens. She played in the women's doubles with partner Mia Audina. They had a bye in the first round and defeated Ella Tripp and Joanne Wright of Great Britain in the second. In the quarterfinals, Jonathans and Audina lost to Lee Kyung-won and Ra Kyung-min of South Korea 5–15, 2–15. Jonathans also competed in the mixed doubles with partner Chris Bruil, who was her husband until 2008. They had a bye in the first round and were defeated by Kim Dong-moon and Ra Kyung-min of South Korea in the round of 16.

She captured the women's doubles title with Mia Audina at the 2004 European Badminton Championships in Geneva, Switzerland. She won gold with the Dutch National badminton team at the 2006 European Women's Team Championships in Thessalonica, Greece. She also won two silver medals (2004 and 2006) and a bronze (2002) with the Dutch squad at the European Mixed Team Championships.

Jonathans also won a bronze (2002) and a silver medal (2006) with the Dutch women's team at the Uber Cup. As a part of the BC Amersfoort team with Yao Jie, Larisa Griga, Dicky Palyama and Eric Pang, Jonathans reached the final of the 2007 European Cup in Amersfoort where they lost against the team of NL Primoriye.

== Achievements ==
=== European Championships ===
Women's doubles
Year	Venue	Partner	Opponent	Score	Result
2004	Queue d’Arve Sport Center; Geneva, Switzerland	(Netherlands) Mia Audina	(Denmark) Ann-Lou Jørgensen (Denmark) Rikke Olsen	15–0, 15–1	Gold

=== BWF Grand Prix ===
The BWF Grand Prix had two levels, the Grand Prix and Grand Prix Gold. It was a series of badminton tournaments sanctioned by the Badminton World Federation (BWF) and played between 2007 and 2017. The World Badminton Grand Prix was sanctioned by the International Badminton Federation from 1983 to 2006.

Women's doubles
Year	Venue	Partner	Opponent	Score	Result
2000	Indonesia Open	(Netherlands) Nicole van Hooren	(England) Joanne Goode (England) Donna Kellogg	15–7, 12–15, 10–15	(silver) Runner-up
2002	Swiss Open	(England) Gail Emms	(South Korea) Lee Kyung-won (South Korea) Ra Kyung-min	1–7, 1–7, 1–7	(silver) Runner-up
2002	Denmark Open	(Netherlands) Mia Audina	(China) Wei Yili (China) Zhao Tingting	3–11, 11–6, 9–11	(silver) Runner-up
2002	German Open	(Netherlands) Mia Audina	(Denmark) Ann-Lou Jørgensen (Denmark) Rikke Olsen	11–2, 11–2	(gold) Winner
2005	Dutch Open	(Netherlands) Mia Audina	(Malaysia) Chin Eei Hui (Malaysia) Wong Pei Tty	15–9, 15–10	(gold) Winner
2010	Bitburger Open	(Netherlands) Paulien van Dooremalen	(China) Pan Pan (China) Tian Qing	7–21, 10–21	(silver) Runner-up

Mixed doubles
Year	Tournament	Partner	Opponent	Score	Result
2001	Dutch Open	(Netherlands) Chris Bruil	(England) Nathan Robertson (England) Gail Emms	5–7, 7–3, 3–7, 4–7	(silver) Runner-up

BWF Grand Prix Gold tournament
BWF Grand Prix tournament

=== BWF International Challenge/Series ===
Women's doubles
Year	Venue	Partner	Opponent	Score	Result
1995	Welsh International	(England) Gail Emms	(Russia) Elena Rybkhina (Russia) Marina Yakusheva	8–15, 4–15	(silver) Runner-up
1996	Hungarian International	(Netherlands) Anthoinette Achterberg	(Sweden) Astrid Crabo (Sweden) Johanna Holgersson	10–15, 3–15	(silver) Runner-up
1997	Hungarian International	(Netherlands) Ginny Severien	(England) Tracey Hallam (England) Rebecca Pantaney	5–9, 4–9, 9–4, 9–7, 11–9	(gold) Winner
1998	Amor International	(Netherlands) Nicole van Hooren	(Denmark) Britta Andersen (Denmark) Lene Mørk	15–6, 15–3	(gold) Winner
2001	BMW Open	(Netherlands) Lonneke Janssen	(Bulgaria) Neli Boteva (Ukraine) Elena Nozdran	5–7, 5–7, 7–4, 4–7	(silver) Runner-up
2002	BMW Open	(Netherlands) Mia Audina	(Denmark) Ann-Lou Jørgensen (Denmark) Rikke Olsen	5–11, 11–5, 11–8	(gold) Winner
2010	Swedish International	(Netherlands) Paulien van Dooremalen	(Denmark) Helle Nielsen (Denmark) Marie Røpke	21–17, 15–21, 18–21	(silver) Runner-up
2010	Spanish International	(Netherlands) Paulien van Dooremalen	(Sweden) Emelie Lennartsson (Sweden) Emma Wengberg	16–21, 19–21	(silver) Runner-up
2010	Belgian International	(Netherlands) Paulien van Dooremalen	(Germany) Sandra Marinello (Germany) Birgit Overzier	19–21, 21–18, 12–21	(silver) Runner-up
2010	Norwegian International	(Netherlands) Paulien van Dooremalen	(Germany) Sandra Marinello (Germany) Birgit Overzier	21–14, 21–15	(gold) Winner
2011	Dutch International	(Netherlands) Paulien van Dooremalen	(Russia) Valeria Sorokina (Russia) Nina Vislova	22–24, 12–21	(silver) Runner-up
2011	Spanish International	(Netherlands) Paulien van Dooremalen	(Canada) Nicole Grether (Canada) Charmaine Reid	12–21, 21–18, 21–14	(gold) Winner
2011	Norwegian International	(Netherlands) Paulien van Dooremalen	(United States) Eva Lee (United States) Paula Lynn Obañana	21–17, 6–21, 13–21	(silver) Runner-up
2012	Dutch International	(Netherlands) Paulien van Dooremalen	(Netherlands) Selena Piek (Netherlands) Iris Tabeling	17–21, 21–19, 23–21	(gold) Winner

Mixed doubles
Year	Tournament	Partner	Opponent	Score	Result
1997	Hungarian International	(Netherlands) Norbert van Barneveld	(Slovenia) Andrej Pohar (Slovenia) Maja Pohar	5–9, 9–4, 9–3, 9–5	(gold) Winner
1998	French Open	(Netherlands) Norbert van Barneveld	(Portugal) Hugo Rodrigues (Portugal) Ana Ferreira	7–15, 15–4, 15–6	(gold) Winner
1998	Amor International	(Netherlands) Norbert van Barneveld	(Netherlands) Dennis Lens (Netherlands) Nicole van Hooren	15–18, 12–15	(silver) Runner-up
2001	French Open	(Netherlands) Chris Bruil	(Denmark) Peter Steffensen (Denmark) Lene Mørk	7–0, 7–2, 7–1	(gold) Winner
2001	Dutch International	(Netherlands) Chris Bruil	(Netherlands) Tijs Creemers (Netherlands) Betty Krab	15–1, 15–1	(gold) Winner
2001	BMW Open	(Netherlands) Chris Bruil	(Ukraine) Vladislav Druzchenko (Ukraine) Elena Nozdran	7–3, 5–7, 2–7, 7–0, 7–2	(gold) Winner

BWF International Challenge tournament
BWF Future Series tournament
