= Chris Bruil =

Dutch badminton player

Personal information
- Full name: Christiaan Gerrit Herman Bruil
- Country: Netherlands
- Born: 20 December 1970 (age 54); Doetinchem, Gelderland, Netherlands
- Height: 1.90 m (6 ft 3 in)
- Handedness: Right
Medal record
Men's badminton
Representing Netherlands
European Championships
Bronze medal – third place	2000 Glasgow	Mixed doubles
Bronze medal – third place	2002 Malmö	Mixed doubles
European Mixed Team Championships
Bronze medal – third place	2000 Glasgow	Mixed team
Bronze medal – third place	2002 Malmö	Mixed team
European Junior Championships
Bronze medal – third place	1989 Manchester	Boys' singles
Bronze medal – third place	1989 Manchester	Boys' doubles
- BWF profile

Christiaan "Chris" Gerrit Herman Bruil (born 20 December 1970 in Doetinchem, Gelderland) is a male badminton player from the Netherlands.

Bruil competed in badminton at the 2004 Summer Olympics in mixed doubles with partner Lotte Bruil-Jonathans, who is his wife. They had a bye in the first round and were defeated by Kim Dong-moon and Ra Kyung-min of Korea in the round of 16. He also participated four years earlier at the 2000 Summer Olympics when he reached the quarter-finals in mixed doubles alongside Erica van den Heuvel. They were eventually beaten by Joanne Goode and Simon Archer.
