= Ella Tripp =

English badminton player

Personal information
- Born: Ella Kate Miles; 7 November 1976 (age 49) Shrewsbury, Shropshire, England
- Height: 1.80 m (5 ft 11 in)
- Weight: 70 kg (154 lb)

Sport
- Country: England
- Sport: Badminton
- Event: mixed doubles

mixed doubles
- BWF profile
Medal record
Women's badminton
Representing England
Commonwealth Games
Silver medal – second place	2006 Melbourne	Mixed team
European Championships
Bronze medal – third place	2002 Malmö	Women's doubles
European Women's Team Championships
Silver medal – second place	2006 Thessaloniki	Women's team
European Junior Championships
Bronze medal – third place	1995 Nitra	Girls' doubles
Bronze medal – third place	1995 Nitra	Mixed team

Ella Kate Tripp (born 7 November 1976; née Miles) is an English badminton player.

Tripp competed in badminton at the 2004 Summer Olympics in women's doubles with partner Joanne Wright. They beat Bulgarians in the first round and were defeated by Lotte Bruil and Mia Audina of the Netherlands in the round of 16. On 17 May 2007 she retired from international badminton, in order to spend more time with her nine-month-old son Callum. She will continue to play county badminton for Cheshire.
