= Baltiska Hallen =

Indoor arena in Malmö, Sweden

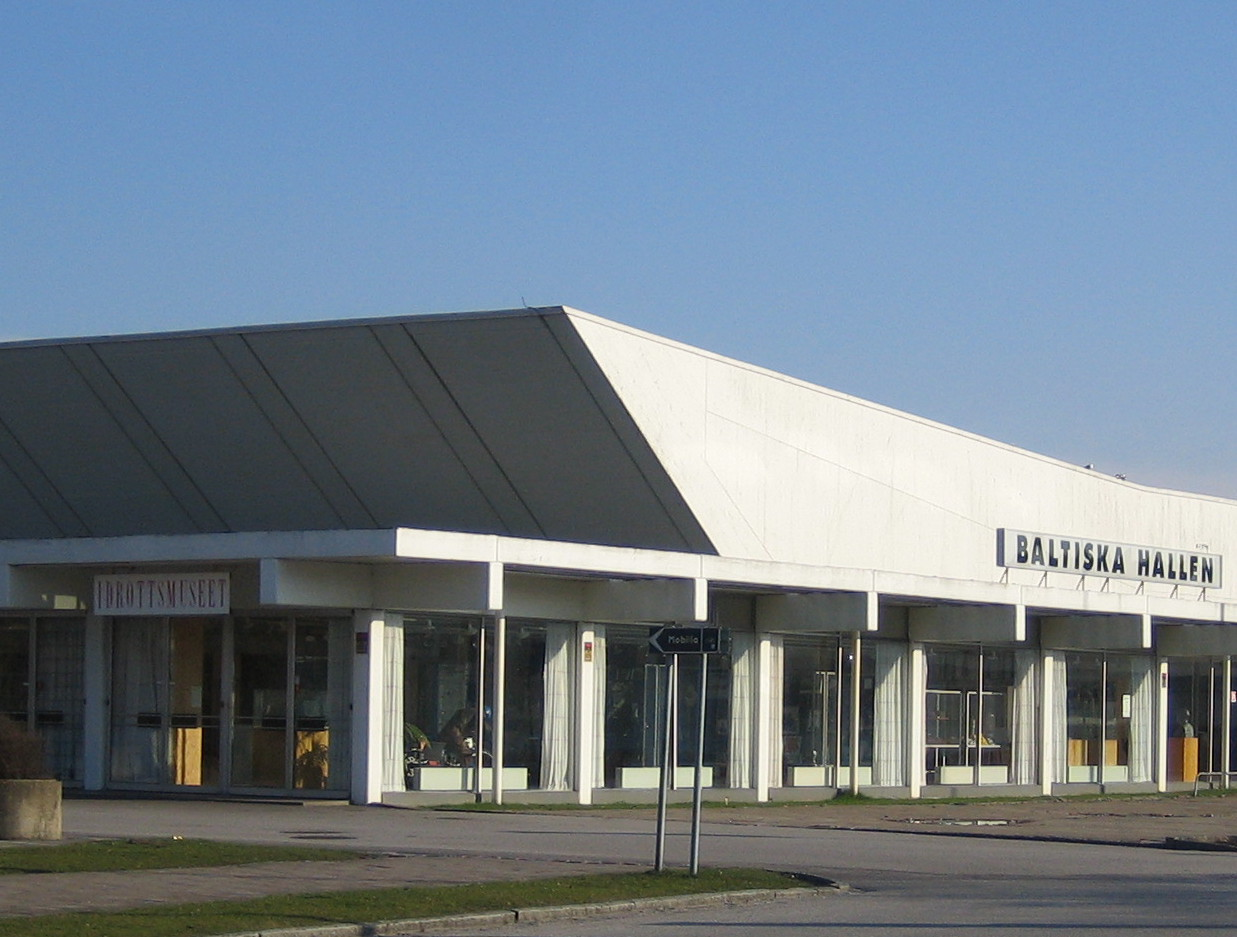
- Interactive map of Baltiska Hallen
- Location: Malmö, Sweden
- Coordinates: 55°35′01″N 12°59′29″E
- Capacity: 4,077 (sport); 3,943 (concerts)

Construction
- Opened: 1964
- Renovated: 2008

Baltiska Hallen (The Baltic Hall) is a multi-purpose indoor arena in the Stadionområdet area of Malmö, Sweden. It opened in 1964 in memory of the 50th anniversary of the Baltic Exhibition in 1914. The arena has a capacity of 4,000 people and is the home of HK Malmö.

== Events ==
Arena during Malmö Game Week 2023

It has served as host to numerous of events such as the 1964 Table Tennis European Championships, 1967 IHF World Men's Handball Championships, 1996 Davis Cup, 2006 Men's World Floorball Championships and 2006 European Women's Handball Championships.

Over the years, it played host to The Rolling Stones, Johnny Cash, Ulf Lundell and Gilbert O'Sullivan.

In 2009, the hall was host to a controversial Sweden-Israel tennis game as part of the 2009 Davis Cup. A large protest march to the hall escalated when a group of several hundred broke off from the march to attack police who had cordoned off the area around the stadium.

In December 2024, the arena was one of the two venues of the 2024 Men's World Floorball Championships.

== See also ==
- List of indoor arenas in Sweden
- List of indoor arenas in Nordic countries
