= 2000 Thomas Cup group stage =

Badminton team Tournament in Kuala Lumpur

The 2000 Thomas Cup group stage was held at Putra Indoor Stadium in Kuala Lumpur, Malaysia, from 11 to 16 May 2000.

The group stage was first stage of the tournament where only the two highest-placing teams in each of the two groups advanced to the knockout stage.

== Draw ==
The original draw for the tournament was conducted on 31 March 2000. The 8 teams will be drawn into two groups each containing four teams.

=== Group composition ===
Group
Group A	Group B
Denmark; India; South Korea; Malaysia (Host)	China; England; Indonesia; Sweden

== Group A ==
Pos	Team	Pld	W	L	GF	GA	GD	PF	PA	PD	Pts	Qualification
1	South Korea	3	3	0	21	12	+9	416	364	+52	3	Advance to semi-finals
2	Denmark	3	2	1	23	10	+13	446	323	+123	2	Advance to semi-finals
3	Malaysia (H)	3	1	2	18	18	0	443	421	+22	1	
4	India	3	0	3	5	27	−22	263	460	−197	0	

Source: The Straits Times
(H) Host

=== Malaysia vs South Korea ===
Malaysia
2
Putra Stadium
12 May 2000, 18:30 UTC+8

South Korea
3

			1	2	3
1	(Malaysia) (South Korea)	Wong Choong Hann; Shon Seung-mo	15; 8	5; 15	15; 13
2	(Malaysia) (South Korea)	Choong Tan Fook / Lee Wan Wah; Ha Tae-kwon / Kim Dong-moon	13; 15	6; 15
3	(Malaysia) (South Korea)	Ong Ewe Hock; Lee Hyun-il	13; 15	15; 4	11; 15
4	(Malaysia) (South Korea)	Chan Chong Ming / Cheah Soon Kit; Lee Dong-soo / Yoo Yong-sung	11; 15	8; 15
5	(Malaysia) (South Korea)	Roslin Hashim; Ahn Jae-chang	15; 13	15; 8

=== Denmark vs India ===
Denmark
5
Putra Stadium
12 May 2000, 18:30 UTC+8

India
0

			1	2	3
1	(Denmark) (India)	Peter Gade; Pullela Gopichand	15; 1	15; 6
2	(Denmark) (India)	Martin Lundgaard Hansen / Lars Paaske; Marcos Bristow / Vijaydeep Singh	15; 6	15; 4
3	(Denmark) (India)	Poul-Erik Høyer Larsen; Nikhil Kanetkar	15; 6	15; 7
4	(Denmark) (India)	Jens Eriksen / Jesper Larsen; Jaseel P. Ismail / George Thomas	15; 5	15; 5
5	(Denmark) (India)	Kenneth Jonassen; Siddharth Jain	17; 16	15; 9

=== Denmark vs South Korea ===
Denmark
2
Putra Stadium
14 May 2000, 18:30 UTC+8

South Korea
3

			1	2	3
1	(Denmark) (South Korea)	Peter Gade; Shon Seung-mo	15; 5	15; 10
2	(Denmark) (South Korea)	Martin Lundgaard Hansen / Lars Paaske; Ha Tae-kwon / Kim Dong-moon	16; 17	5; 15
3	(Denmark) (South Korea)	Poul-Erik Høyer Larsen; Lee Hyun-il	15; 13	12; 15	12; 15
4	(Denmark) (South Korea)	Jens Eriksen / Jesper Larsen; Lee Dong-soo / Yoo Yong-sung	15; 10	15; 1
5	(Denmark) (South Korea)	Kenneth Jonassen; Park Tae-sang	7; 15	7; 15

=== Malaysia vs India ===
Malaysia
4
Putra Stadium
14 May 2000, 18:30 UTC+8

India
1

			1	2	3
1	(Malaysia) (India)	Wong Choong Hann; Pullela Gopichand	17; 14	14; 17	15; 1
2	(Malaysia) (India)	Choong Tan Fook / Lee Wan Wah; Marcos Bristow / Vijaydeep Singh	7; 15	15; 2	15; 1
3	(Malaysia) (India)	Yong Hock Kin; Nikhil Kanetkar	15; 9	17; 14
4	(Malaysia) (India)	Cheah Soon Kit / Yap Kim Hock; George Thomas / Jaseel P. Ismail	15; 6	15; 3
5	(Malaysia) (India)	Roslin Hashim; Siddharth Jain	10; 15	15; 5	4; 8	retired

=== South Korea vs India ===
South Korea
4
Putra Stadium
16 May 2000, 18:30 UTC+8

India
1

			1	2	3
1	(South Korea) (India)	Shon Seung-mo; Pullela Gopichand	7; 15	7; 15
2	(South Korea) (India)	Lee Dong-soo / Yoo Yong-sung; Marcos Bristow / Vijaydeep Singh	15; 0	15; 8
3	(South Korea) (India)	Lee Hyun-il; Nikhil Kanetkar	15; 12	15; 5
4	(South Korea) (India)	Ahn Jae-chang / Kim Dong-moon; Chetan Anand / Sachin Ratti	15; 2	15; 8
5	(South Korea) (India)	Park Tae-sang; Siddharth Jain	15; 12	15; 11

=== Denmark vs Malaysia ===
Malaysia
1
Putra Stadium
16 May 2000, 18:30 UTC+8

Denmark
4

			1	2	3
1	(Malaysia) (Denmark)	Wong Choong Hann; Peter Gade	7; 15	6; 15
2	(Malaysia) (Denmark)	Choong Tan Fook / Lee Wan Wah; Martin Lundgaard Hansen / Lars Paaske	15; 12	15; 10
3	(Malaysia) (Denmark)	Ong Ewe Hock; Poul-Erik Høyer Larsen	14; 17	12; 15
4	(Malaysia) (Denmark)	Cheah Soon Kit / Yap Kim Hock; Jens Eriksen / Jesper Larsen	8; 15	15; 8	5; 15
5	(Malaysia) (Denmark)	Yong Hock Kin; Kenneth Jonassen	15; 6	14; 17	1; 15

== Group B ==
Pos	Team	Pld	W	L	GF	GA	GD	PF	PA	PD	Pts	Qualification
1	Indonesia	3	3	0	28	3	+25	444	231	+213	3	Advance to semi-finals
2	China	3	2	1	22	10	+12	424	294	+130	2	Advance to semi-finals
3	England	3	1	2	10	22	−12	310	438	−128	1	
4	Sweden	3	0	3	3	28	−25	245	460	−215	0	

Source: The Straits Times

=== Indonesia vs Sweden ===
Indonesia
5
Putra Stadium
11 May 2000, 18:30 UTC+8

Sweden
0

			1	2	3
1	(Indonesia) (Sweden)	Hendrawan; Tomas Johansson	15; 5	17; 14
2	(Indonesia) (Sweden)	Tony Gunawan / Candra Wijaya; Pär-Gunnar Jönsson / Peter Axelsson	15; 5	15; 1
3	(Indonesia) (Sweden)	Taufik Hidayat; Rasmus Wengberg	15; 3	15; 9
4	(Indonesia) (Sweden)	Rexy Mainaky / Ricky Subagja; Henrik Andersson / Fredrik Bergström	15; 4	15; 3
5	(Indonesia) (Sweden)	Marleve Mainaky; Martin Hagberg	15; 2	15; 4

=== China vs England ===
China
4
Putra Stadium
11 May 2000, 18:30 UTC+8

England
1

			1	2	3
1	(China) (England)	Xia Xuanze; Colin Haughton	15; 2	15; 3
2	(China) (England)	Yu Jinhao / Zhang Jun; Simon Archer / Nathan Robertson	15; 10	16; 17	13; 15
3	(China) (England)	Ji Xinpeng; Darren Hall	15; 7	15; 0
4	(China) (England)	Liu Yong / Zhang Wei; Chris Hunt / Julian Robertson	15; 6	15; 8
5	(China) (England)	Luo Yigang; Michael Edge	15; 6	15; 7

=== China vs Sweden ===
China
5
Putra Stadium
13 May 2000, 18:30 UTC+8

Sweden
0

			1	2	3
1	(China) (Sweden)	Xia Xuanze; Tomas Johansson	15; 4	15; 10
2	(China) (Sweden)	Yu Jinhao / Zhang Jun; Pär-Gunnar Jönsson / Peter Axelsson	15; 7	15; 4
3	(China) (Sweden)	Ji Xinpeng; Rasmus Wengberg	15; 9	15; 9
4	(China) (Sweden)	Liu Yong / Zhang Wei; Henrik Andersson / Fredrik Bergström	15; 4	15; 4
5	(China) (Sweden)	Chen Hong; Martin Hagberg	15; 10	15; 12

=== Indonesia vs England ===
Indonesia
5
Putra Stadium
13 May 2000, 18:30 UTC+8

England
0

			1	2	3
1	(Indonesia) (England)	Hendrawan; Colin Haughton	15; 8	17; 12
2	(Indonesia) (England)	Tony Gunawan / Candra Wijaya; Simon Archer / Nathan Robertson	15; 12	15; 5
3	(Indonesia) (England)	Taufik Hidayat; Mark Constable	15; 6	15; 5
4	(Indonesia) (England)	S. Antonius Budi Ariantho / Sigit Budiarto; Anthony Clark / Ian Sullivan	15; 6	15; 9
5	(Indonesia) (England)	Marleve Mainaky; Michael Edge	15; 3	15; 5

=== Sweden vs England ===
Sweden
1
Putra Stadium
16 May 2000, 18:30 UTC+8

England
4

			1	2	3
1	(Sweden) (England)	Tomas Johansson; Colin Haughton	15; 13	15; 11
2	(Sweden) (England)	Rasmus Wengberg; Darren Hall	17; 14	12; 15	12; 15
3	(Sweden) (England)	Peter Axelsson / Pär-Gunnar Jönsson; Simon Archer / Nathan Robertson	9; 15	6; 15
4	(Sweden) (England)	Martin Hagberg; Mark Constable	9; 15	12; 15
5	(Sweden) (England)	Fredrik Bergström / Rasmus Wengberg; Anthony Clark / Ian Sullivan	8; 15	7; 15

=== Indonesia vs China ===
Indonesia
4
Putra Stadium
16 May 2000, 18:30 UTC+8

China
1

			1	2	3
1	(Indonesia) (China)	Hendrawan; Ji Xinpeng	15; 7	15; 12
2	(Indonesia) (China)	Tony Gunawan / Candra Wijaya; Chen Qiqiu / Yu Jinhao	15; 10	15; 11
3	(Indonesia) (China)	Taufik Hidayat; Luo Yigang	15; 10	6; 15	15; 10
4	(Indonesia) (China)	Rexy Mainaky / Ricky Subagja; Zhang Jun / Zhang Wei	8; 15	6; 15
5	(Indonesia) (China)	Marleve Mainaky; Chen Hong	15; 2	15; 3
