= 2000 Thomas Cup knockout stage =

2000 Knockout stage of the Thomas Cup badminton team championship

The knockout stage for the 2000 Thomas Cup in Kuala Lumpur began on 18 May 2000 with the semi-finals and ended on 21 May 2000 with the final.

== Qualified teams ==
The top two placed teams from each of the two groups qualified for this stage.

Group	Winners	Runners-up
A	South Korea	Denmark
B	Indonesia	China

== Bracket ==
Semi-finals
South Korea	1
China	3
Denmark	2
Indonesia	3

Final
China	0
Indonesia	3

== Semi-finals ==
=== Semi-final 1 ===
China
3
Putra Stadium
18 May 2000, 18:30 UTC+8

South Korea
1

			1	2	3
1	(China) (South Korea)	Xia Xuanze; Lee Hyun-il	15; 6	15; 5
2	(China) (South Korea)	Chen Qiqiu / Yu Jinhao; Ha Tae-kwon / Kim Dong-moon	11; 15	15; 5	9; 15
3	(China) (South Korea)	Ji Xinpeng; Ahn Jae-chang	15; 12	15; 10
4	(China) (South Korea)	Zhang Jun / Zhang Wei; Lee Dong-soo / Yoo Yong-Ssung	15; 9	12; 15	15; 9
5	(China) (South Korea)	Luo Yigang; Park Tae-sang				not played

=== Semi-final 2 ===
Indonesia
3
Putra Stadium
19 May 2000, 18:30 UTC+8

Denmark
2

			1	2	3
1	(Indonesia) (Denmark)	Hendrawan; Peter Gade	15; 12	16; 17	11; 15
2	(Indonesia) (Denmark)	Tony Gunawan / Rexy Mainaky; Martin Lundgaard Hansen / Lars Paaske	15; 7	15; 3
3	(Indonesia) (Denmark)	Taufik Hidayat; Poul-Erik Hoyer-Larsen	15; 11	15; 9
4	(Indonesia) (Denmark)	Candra Wijaya / Sigit Budiarto; Jens Eriksen / Jesper Larsen	15; 8	15; 17	16; 17
5	(Indonesia) (Denmark)	Marleve Mainaky; Kenneth Jonassen	15; 14	15; 13

== Final ==
Indonesia
3
Putra Stadium
21 May 2000, 18:30 UTC+8

China
0

			1	2	3
1	(Indonesia) (China)	Hendrawan; Xia Xuanze	11; 15	15; 7	15; 9
2	(Indonesia) (China)	Tony Gunawan / Rexy Mainaky; Chen Qiqiu / Yu Jinhao	15; 9	15; 2
3	(Indonesia) (China)	Taufik Hidayat; Ji Xinpeng	15; 9	17; 14
4	(Indonesia) (China)	Candra Wijaya / Sigit Budiarto; Zhang Jun / Zhang Wei				not played
5	(Indonesia) (China)	Marleve Mainaky; Luo Yigang				not played
