= Kim Dong-soo =

Kim Dong-soo (Korean: 김동수) is a Korean name consisting of the family name Kim and the given name Dong-soo, and may also refer to:

- Kim Dong-soo (baseball) (born 1968), South Korean baseball player
- Kim Dong-soo (canoeist) (born 1969), South Korean canoeist
- Kim Dong-soo (esports player) (born 1981), South Korean StarCraft player
- Kim Dong-su (footballer) (born 1995), South Korean association football player
- Kim Dong-soo (born 1947) (born 1947), South Korean actor
- Kim Dong-soo (born 1955) (born 1955), South Korean officer
- Kim Dong-soo (born 1957) (born 1957), South Korean politician
- Kim Dong-soo (born 1970) (born 1970), South Korean actor
