= Choi Dong-soo =

Choi Dong-soo (Korean: 최동수) is a Korean name consisting of the family name Choi and the given name Dong-soo, and may also refer to:

- Choi Dong-soo (baseball) (born 1971), South Korean baseball player
- Choi Dong-soo (footballer) (born 1985), South Korean football player
