= 2001 IBF World Championships – Mixed doubles =

Mixed doubles at the 2001 IBF World Championships
- Venue: Palacio de Deportes de San Pablo
- Location: Seville, Spain
- Dates: June 3, 2001 – June 10, 2001

Medalists
| gold medal | Zhang Jun; Gao Ling | China |
| silver medal | Kim Dong-moon; Ra Kyung-min | South Korea |
| bronze medal | Michael Søgaard; Rikke Olsen | Denmark |
| bronze medal | Jens Eriksen; Mette Schjoldager | Denmark |

The 12th IBF World Championships, also known as the World Badminton Championships, were held in the Palacio de Deportes de San Pablo, Seville, Spain, between 3 June and 10 June 2001. Following the results in the mixed doubles.

== Main stage ==
=== Section 1 ===
First round
(China) Zhang Jun (China) Gao Ling | 15 | 15
(Bulgaria) Konstantin Dobrev (Bulgaria) Petya Nedeltcheva | 2 | 10
(Malaysia) Chang Kim Wai (Malaysia) Ang Li Peng | 15 | 15
(Slovakia) Michal Matejka (Slovakia) Eva Sladekova | 3 | 1
(New Zealand) Daniel Shirley (New Zealand) Sara Runesten-Petersen | 15 | 15
(Japan) Tadashi Ohtsuka (Japan) Shizuka Yamamoto | 2 | 11
(Ukraine) Konstantin Tatranov (Ukraine) Natalja Esipenko | 15 | 9 | 15
(Scotland) Russell Hogg (Scotland) Kirsteen McEwan | 9 | 15 | 8
(Indonesia) Nova Widianto (Indonesia) Vita Marissa | 15 | 10 | 15
(Denmark) Jonas Rasmussen (Denmark) Majken Vange | 9 | 15 | 9
(Czech Republic) Jan Vondra (Czech Republic) Markéta Koudelková | 15 | 13 | 15
(Slovenia) Andrej Pohar (Slovenia) Maja Pohar | 13 | 15 | 11
(South Korea) Lee Jae Jin (South Korea) Hwang Yu Mi | 12 | 15 | 15
(England) Anthony Clark (England) Gail Emms | 15 | 5 | 8
(Russia) Alexandr Nikolaenko (Russia) Irina Rusljakova | 15 | 15
(Wales) Martyn Lewis (Wales) Kate Ridler | 0 | 0

Second round
(China) Zhang Jun (China) Gao Ling | 15 | 15
(Malaysia) Chang Kim Wai (Malaysia) Ang Li Peng | 6 | 3
(New Zealand) Daniel Shirley (New Zealand) Sara Runesten-Petersen | 15 | 15
(Ukraine) Konstantin Tatranov (Ukraine) Natalja Esipenko | 2 | 2
(Indonesia) Nova Widianto (Indonesia) Vita Marissa | 15 | 15
(Czech Republic) Jan Vondra (Czech Republic) Markéta Koudelková | 1 | 9
(South Korea) Lee Jae Jin (South Korea) Hwang Yu Mi | 15 | 15
(Russia) Alexandr Nikolaenko (Russia) Irina Rusljakova | 12 | 13

Third round
(China) Zhang Jun (China) Gao Ling | 15 | 15
(New Zealand) Daniel Shirley (New Zealand) Sara Runesten-Petersen | 13 | 5
(Indonesia) Nova Widianto (Indonesia) Vita Marissa | 15 | 15
(South Korea) Lee Jae Jin (South Korea) Hwang Yu Mi | 8 | 8

Quarterfinals
(China) Zhang Jun (China) Gao Ling | 15 | 15
(Indonesia) Nova Widianto (Indonesia) Vita Marissa | 9 | 6

=== Section 2 ===
First round
(Denmark) Jens Eriksen (Denmark) Mette Schjoldager | 15 | 15
(Russia) Alexandr Russkikh (Russia) Anastasia Russkikh | 0 | 3
(Germany) Kristof Hopp (Germany) Kathrin Piotrowski | 15 | 15
(Spain) Sergio Llopis (Spain) Mercedes Cuenca | 7 | 10
(South Korea) Lee Dong-soo (South Korea) Lee Hyo-jung | 15 | 6 | 15
(Sweden) Fredrik Bergström (Sweden) Jenny Karlsson | 10 | 15 | 13
15 | 15
(Japan) Norio Imai (Japan) Chikako Nakayama | 7 | 9
(Netherlands) Chris Bruil (Netherlands) Lotte Jonathans | 15 | 15
(Austria) Jürgen Koch (Austria) Bettina Weilguni | 0 | 3
(England) Graham Hurrell (England) Sarah Hardaker | 15 | 14 | 15
(India) V. Diju (India) P. V. V. Lakshmi | 8 | 17 | 11
(Hong Kong) Liu Kwok Wa (Hong Kong) Louisa Koon Wai Chee | 15 | 15
(Switzerland) Pascal Bircher (Switzerland) Santi Wibowo | 8 | 3
(Chinese Taipei) Cheng Wen-Hsing (Chinese Taipei) Chien Yu Hsun | 15 | 15
(New Zealand) Chris Blair (New Zealand) Nicole Gordon | 1 | 4

Second round
(Denmark) Jens Eriksen (Denmark) Mette Schjoldager | 15 | 15
(Germany) Kristof Hopp (Germany) Kathrin Piotrowski | 6 | 8
(South Korea) Lee Dong-soo (South Korea) Lee Hyo-jung | 9 | 15 | 15
(China) Deng Chuanhai (China) Wei Yili | 15 | 9 | 9
(Netherlands) Chris Bruil (Netherlands) Lotte Jonathans | 15 | 15
(England) Graham Hurrell (England) Sarah Hardaker | 11 | 5
(Hong Kong) Liu Kwok Wa (Hong Kong) Louisa Koon Wai Chee | 6 | 15
(Chinese Taipei) Cheng Wen-Hsing (Chinese Taipei) Chien Yu Hsun | 12 | 10

Third round
(Denmark) Jens Eriksen (Denmark) Mette Schjoldager | 15 | 15
(South Korea) Lee Dong-soo (South Korea) Lee Hyo-jung | 10 | 11
(Netherlands) Chris Bruil (Netherlands) Lotte Jonathans | 15 | 15
(Hong Kong) Liu Kwok Wa (Hong Kong) Louisa Koon Wai Chee | 9 | 1

Quarterfinals
(Denmark) Jens Eriksen (Denmark) Mette Schjoldager | 15 | 15
(Netherlands) Chris Bruil (Netherlands) Lotte Jonathans | 3 | 5

=== Section 3 ===
First round
(South Korea) Kim Dong-moon (South Korea) Ra Kyung-min | 15 | 15
(England) Nathan Robertson (England) Donna Kellogg | 6 | 5
(Singapore) Hendry Kurniawan Saputra (Singapore) Jiang Yanmei | 15 | 15
(New Zealand) Geoffrey Bellingham (New Zealand) Rhona Robertson | 8 | 2
(Germany) Björn Siegemund (Germany) Nicol Pitro | w.o.
(Lithuania) Donatas Narvilas (Lithuania) Neringa Karosaitė
(Spain) José Antonio Crespo (Spain) Dolores Marco | 15 | 15
(Austria) Martin de Jonge (Austria) Sabine Franz | 3 | 7
(Indonesia) Bambang Suprianto (Indonesia) Minarti Timur | 15 | 15
(India) Jaseel P. Ismail (India) Madhumita Bisht | 4 | 8
(Portugal) Ricardo Fernandes (Portugal) Vania Leca | w.o.
(Belarus) Andrei Konakh (Belarus) Nadieżda Kostiuczyk
(China) Chen Lin (China) Chen Qiqiu | 10 | 15 | 17
(Denmark) Lars Paaske (Denmark) Pernille Harder | 15 | 4 | 14
(Malaysia) Chew Choon Eng (Malaysia) Wong Pei Tty | 15 | 15
(Sweden) Ola Molin (Sweden) Johanna Persson | 12 | 10

Second round
(South Korea) Kim Dong-moon (South Korea) Ra Kyung-min | 15 | 15
(Singapore) Hendry Kurniawan Saputra (Singapore) Jiang Yanmei | 6 | 3
(Germany) Björn Siegemund (Germany) Nicol Pitro | 15 | 15
(Spain) José Antonio Crespo (Spain) Dolores Marco | 6 | 5
(Indonesia) Bambang Suprianto (Indonesia) Minarti Timur | 15 | 15
(Portugal) Ricardo Fernandes (Portugal) Vania Leca | 1 | 4
(China) Chen Lin (China) Chen Qiqiu | 15 | 15
(Malaysia) Chew Choon Eng (Malaysia) Wong Pei Tty | 11 | 9

Third round
(South Korea) Kim Dong-moon (South Korea) Ra Kyung-min | 15 | 15
(Germany) Björn Siegemund (Germany) Nicol Pitro | 6 | 7
(Indonesia) Bambang Suprianto (Indonesia) Minarti Timur | 15 | 15
(China) Chen Lin (China) Chen Qiqiu | 12 | 9

Quarterfinals
(South Korea) Kim Dong-moon (South Korea) Ra Kyung-min | 15 | 15
(Indonesia) Bambang Suprianto (Indonesia) Minarti Timur | 11 | 9

=== Section 4 ===
First round
(Denmark) Michael Søgaard (Denmark) Rikke Olsen | 15 | 15
(Malaysia) Rosman Razak (Malaysia) Fong Chen Yen | 2 | 3
(Thailand) Khunakorn Sudhisodhi (Thailand) Saralee Thungthongkam | 15 | 15
(Canada) Brent Olynyk (Canada) Denyse Julien | 2 | 8
(New Zealand) Nicholas Hall (New Zealand) Lianne Shirley | 15 | 7 | 15
(Slovakia) Pavol Mecar (Slovakia) Barbora Bobrovska | 5 | 15 | 8
(England) David Lindley (England) Emma Constable | 15 | 15
(Scotland) Craig Robertson (Wales) Yuan Gao
(China) Liu Yong (China) Cheng Jiao | 15 | 15
(Japan) Keita Masuda (Japan) Seiko Yamada | 9 | 5
(Canada) Bryan Moody (Canada) Milaine Cloutier | 15 | 8 | 15
(Russia) Pavel Uvarov (Russia) Marina Yakusheva | 9 | 15 | 5
(England) Ian Sullivan (Indonesia) Indarti Issolina | 17 | 15
(Hong Kong) Albertus Susanto Njoto (Hong Kong) Ling Wan Ting | 14 | 8
(Germany) Joachim Tesche (Germany) Anne Hönscheid | 15 | 15
(Wales) Chris Davies (Wales) Robyn Ashworth | 8 | 7

Second round
(Denmark) Michael Søgaard (Denmark) Rikke Olsen | 15 | 11 | 15
(Thailand) Khunakorn Sudhisodhi (Thailand) Saralee Thungthongkam | 4 | 15 | 9
(New Zealand) Nicholas Hall (New Zealand) Lianne Shirley | 15 | 9 | 15
(England) David Lindley (England) Emma Constable | 11 | 15 | 6
(China) Liu Yong (China) Cheng Jiao | 15 | 15
(Canada) Bryan Moody (Canada) Milaine Cloutier | 4 | 10
(England) Ian Sullivan (Indonesia) Indarti Issolina | w.o.
(Germany) Joachim Tesche (Germany) Anne Hönscheid

Third round
(Denmark) Michael Søgaard (Denmark) Rikke Olsen | 15 | 15
(New Zealand) Nicholas Hall (New Zealand) Lianne Shirley | 4 | 3
(China) Liu Yong (China) Cheng Jiao | 15 | 15
(England) Ian Sullivan (Indonesia) Indarti Issolina | 8 | 6

Quarterfinals
(Denmark) Michael Søgaard (Denmark) Rikke Olsen | 15 | 6 | 15
(China) Liu Yong (China) Cheng Jiao | 4 | 15 | 12

== Final stage ==
Quarterfinals
3 | (China) Zhang Jun (China) Gao Ling | 15 | 15
(Indonesia) Nova Widianto (Indonesia) Vita Marissa | 9 | 6
2 | (Denmark) Jens Eriksen (Denmark) Mette Schjoldager | 15 | 15
(Netherlands) Chris Bruil (Netherlands) Lotte Jonathans | 3 | 5
(South Korea) Kim Dong-moon (South Korea) Ra Kyung-min | 15 | 15
(Indonesia) Bambang Suprianto (Indonesia) Minarti Timur | 11 | 9
1 | (Denmark) Michael Søgaard (Denmark) Rikke Olsen | 15 | 6 | 15
(China) Liu Yong (China) Cheng Jiao | 4 | 15 | 12

Semifinals
3 | (China) Zhang Jun (China) Gao Ling | 15 | 15
2 | (Denmark) Jens Eriksen (Denmark) Mette Schjoldager | 2 | 12
(South Korea) Kim Dong-moon (South Korea) Ra Kyung-min | 15 | 15
1 | (Denmark) Michael Søgaard (Denmark) Rikke Olsen | 7 | 9

Finals
3 | (China) Zhang Jun (China) Gao Ling | 15 | 12 | 17
(South Korea) Kim Dong-moon (South Korea) Ra Kyung-min | 10 | 15 | 16
