= Kenneth Jonassen =

Danish badminton coach and former player

Personal information
- Born: 3 July 1974 (age 52) Herning, Denmark
- Height: 1.88 m (6 ft 2 in)
- Weight: 81 kg (179 lb; 12.8 st)

Sport
- Country: Denmark
- Sport: Badminton
- Handedness: Right

Men's singles
- Highest ranking: 2 (14 April 2005)
- BWF profile
Medal record
Men's badminton
Representing Denmark
Sudirman Cup
Bronze medal – third place	2005 Beijing	Mixed team
Thomas Cup
Silver medal – second place	2004 Jakarta	Men's team
Silver medal – second place	2006 Sendai & Tokyo	Men's team
Bronze medal – third place	1998 Hong Kong	Men's team
Bronze medal – third place	2000 Kuala Lumpur	Men's team
Bronze medal – third place	2002 Guangzhou	Men's team
European Championships
Gold medal – first place	2008 Herning	Men's singles
Silver medal – second place	1998 Sofia	Men's singles
Silver medal – second place	2002 Malmö	Men's singles
Silver medal – second place	2004 Geneva	Men's singles
Silver medal – second place	2006 Den Bosch	Men's singles
Bronze medal – third place	2000 Glasgow	Men's singles
European Mixed Team Championships
Gold medal – first place	1998 Den Bosch	Mixed team
Gold medal – first place	2000 Glasgow	Mixed team
Gold medal – first place	2002 Malmö	Mixed team
Gold medal – first place	2004 Geneva	Mixed team
European Men's Team Championships
Gold medal – first place	2008 Almere	Men's team
Gold medal – first place	2006 Thessalonica	Men's team

Kenneth Jonassen (born 3 July 1974) is a Danish badminton coach and former player, who won Danish national and international titles during the first decade of the 21st century. The big, hard fighting Dane was often ranked among the top few singles players of that era, but was rather overshadowed by his fellow countryman Peter Gade. He has served the singles head coach of the Malaysia national badminton team since 4 January 2025.

He played badminton at the 2004 Summer Olympics in men's singles, losing in the round of 32 to Chen Hong of China. Jonassen reached the quarterfinals of several Badminton World Championships but never quite made it to the medal rounds.

He won the gold medal at the 2008 European Badminton Championships, late in his career. This, along with victories in the 2003 Korea Open and the 2004 Singapore Open were perhaps his most impressive achievements.

== Major achievements ==
=== European Championships ===
Men's singles
Year	Venue	Opponent	Score	Result
1998	Winter Sports Palace; Sofia, Bulgaria	(Denmark) Peter Gade	8–15, 4–15	Silver
2000	Kelvin Hall International Sports Arena; Glasgow, Scotland	(Denmark) Poul-Erik Hoyer Larsen	8–15, 15–5, 8–15	Bronze
2002	Malmö, Sweden	(Denmark) Peter Rasmussen	7–0, 5–7, 7–3, 5–7, 2–7	Silver
2004	Queue d’Arve Sport Center; Geneva, Switzerland	(Denmark) Peter Gade	9–15, 10–15	Silver
2006	Maaspoort Sports and Events; Den Bosch, Netherlands	(Denmark) Peter Gade	19–21, 18–21	Silver
2008	Messecenter; Herning, Denmark	(Denmark) Joachim Persson	21–13, 21–16	Gold

=== IBF World Grand Prix ===
The World Badminton Grand Prix sanctioned by International Badminton Federation (IBF) from 1983 to 2006.

Men's singles
Year	Tournament	Opponent	Score	Result
1996	French Open	(Sweden) Jesper Olsson	15–2, 5–15, 15–6	(gold) Winner
1997	Russian Open	(Denmark) Poul-Erik Høyer	2–15, 2–15	(silver) Runner-up
2001	U.S. Open	(South Korea) Lee Hyun-il	8–6, 2–7, 2–7, 5–7	(silver) Runner-up
2001	German Open	(Denmark) Niels Christian Kaldau	7–1, 7–8, 8–6, 4–7, 7–5	(gold) Winner
2002	Denmark Open	(China) Chen Hong	9–15, 15–9, 6–15	(silver) Runner-up
2003	Korea Open	(South Korea) Park Tae-sang	15–12, 17–15	(gold) Winner
2004	Dutch Open	(Denmark) Anders Boesen	15–6, 15–6	(gold) Winner
2004	Singapore Open	(Malaysia) Lee Chong Wei	3–15, 17–15, 15–4	(gold) Winner
2005	Korea Open	(Denmark) Peter Gade	15–7, 4–15, 5–15	(silver) Runner-up
2005	Thailand Open	(Malaysia) Hafiz Hashim	13–15, 13–15	(silver) Runner-up
2006	Singapore Open	(Denmark) Peter Gade	10–21, 14–21	(silver) Runner-up

=== IBF International ===
Men's singles
Year	Tournament	Opponent	Score	Result
1995	Irish Open	(Sweden) Rikard Magnusson	11–15, 2–15	(silver) Runner-up
1996	Austrian Open	(England) Robert Nock	15–10, 15–4	(gold) Winner
1996	Amor Tournament	(Netherlands) Jeroen van Dijk	15–12, 5–15, 10–15	(silver) Runner-up
1996	Irish Open	(England) Colin Haughton	8–15, 15–4, 15–8	(gold) Winner
2001	Austrian Open	(Denmark) Niels Christian Kaldau	15–10, 15–7	(gold) Winner
2002	Irish Open	(Finland) Kasperi Salo	15–10, 15–10	(gold) Winner
2003	Irish Open	(Denmark) Kasper Fangel	15–4, 15–9	(gold) Winner

Men's doubles
Year	Tournament	Partner	Opponent	Score	Result
1994	Polish Open	(Denmark) Jan Jorgensen	(Indonesia) Ade Sutrisna (Indonesia) Candra Wijaya	15–11, 8–15, 8–15	(silver) Runner-up
1998	South Africa International	(Denmark) Jonas Rasmussen	(South Africa) Johan Kleingeld (South Africa) Anton Kriel	15–3, 15–8	(gold) Winner

Mixed doubles
Year	Tournament	Partner	Opponent	Score	Result
1998	South Africa International	(South Africa) Beverley Meerholz	(Denmark) Jonas Rasmussen (South Africa) Meagen Burnett	5–15, 7–15	(silver) Runner-up
