= 2004 European Badminton Championships =

Tournament details
- Dates: 16–24 April 2004
- Edition: 19
- Venue: Queue d’Arve Sport Center
- Location: Geneva, Switzerland

Champions
- Men's singles: (Denmark) Peter Gade
- Women's singles: (Netherlands) Mia Audina
- Men's doubles: (Denmark) Jens Eriksen (Denmark) Martin Lundgaard Hansen
- Women's doubles: (Netherlands) Lotte Bruil (Netherlands) Mia Audina
- Mixed doubles: (England) Nathan Robertson (England) Gail Emms

The 19th European Badminton Championships were held in Geneva, Switzerland, between 16 and 24 April 2004.

== Medalists ==
| Event | Gold | Silver | Bronze |
|---|---|---|---|
| Men's singles | (Denmark) Peter Gade | (Denmark) Kenneth Jonassen | (Germany) Björn Joppien |
| Men's singles | (Denmark) Peter Gade | (Denmark) Kenneth Jonassen | (Denmark) Anders Boesen |
| Women's singles | (Netherlands) Mia Audina | (France) Pi Hongyan | (Denmark) Camilla Martin |
| Women's singles | (Netherlands) Mia Audina | (France) Pi Hongyan | (Netherlands) Yao Jie |
| Men's doubles | (Denmark) Jens Eriksen and Martin Lundgaard Hansen | (England) Anthony Clark and Nathan Robertson | (Denmark) Lars Paaske and Jonas Rasmussen |
| Men's doubles | (Denmark) Jens Eriksen and Martin Lundgaard Hansen | (England) Anthony Clark and Nathan Robertson | (Poland) Michal Logosz and Robert Mateusiak |
| Women's doubles | (Netherlands) Lotte Bruil and Mia Audina | (Denmark) Rikke Olsen and Ann-Lou Jørgensen | (Denmark) Mette Schjoldager and Pernille Harder |
| Women's doubles | (Netherlands) Lotte Bruil and Mia Audina | (Denmark) Rikke Olsen and Ann-Lou Jørgensen | (Germany) Juliane Schenk and Nicole Grether |
| Mixed doubles | (England) Nathan Robertson and Gail Emms | (Denmark) Jonas Rasmussen and Rikke Olsen | (Denmark) Jens Eriksen and Mette Schjoldager |
| Mixed doubles | (England) Nathan Robertson and Gail Emms | (Denmark) Jonas Rasmussen and Rikke Olsen | (Sweden) Fredrik Bergström and Johanna Persson |
| Teams | Denmark | Netherlands | Germany |

== Results ==
=== Men's singles ===
Quarterfinals
(Denmark) Kenneth Jonassen | 4 | 15 | 15
(Netherlands) Dicky Palyama | 15 | 12 | 8
(Denmark) Niels Christian Kaldau | 12 | 7
(Germany) Björn Joppien | 15 | 15
(Poland) Przemysław Wacha | 13 | 12
(Denmark) Anders Boesen | 15 | 15
(Norway) Jim Ronny Andersen | 4 | 2
(Denmark) Peter Gade | 15 | 15

Semifinals
(Denmark) Kenneth Jonassen | 15 | 15
(Germany) Björn Joppien | 4 | 8
(Denmark) Anders Boesen | 6 | 2
(Denmark) Peter Gade | 15 | 15

Finals
(Denmark) Kenneth Jonassen | 9 | 10
(Denmark) Peter Gade | 15 | 15

=== Women's singles ===
Quarterfinals
(Netherlands) Mia Audina | 11 | 13
(England) Tracey Hallam | 4 | 11
(Denmark) Camilla Martin | 11 | 11
(Germany) Juliane Schenk | 5 | 1
(Sweden) Marina Andrievskaya | 6 | 9
(Netherlands) Yao Jie | 11 | 11
(Germany) Xu Huaiwen | 6 | 6
(France) Pi Hongyan | 11 | 11

Semifinals
(Netherlands) Mia Audina | 11 | 10 | 11
(Denmark) Camilla Martin | 4 | 13 | 8
(Netherlands) Yao Jie | 4 | 6
(France) Pi Hongyan | 11 | 11

Finals
(Netherlands) Mia Audina | 11 | 11
(France) Pi Hongyan | 1 | 0

=== Men's doubles ===
Semifinals
(Denmark) Lars Paaske (Denmark) Jonas Rasmussen | 15 | 5 | 11
(England) Anthony Clark (England) Nathan Robertson | 11 | 15 | 15
(Poland) Robert Mateusiak (Poland) Michal Logosz | 9 | 15 | 6
(Denmark) Jens Eriksen (Denmark) M. Lundgaard Hansen | 15 | 12 | 15

Final
(England) Anthony Clark (England) Nathan Robertson | 3 | 9
(Denmark) Jens Eriksen (Denmark) M. Lundgaard Hansen | 15 | 15

=== Women's doubles ===
Semifinals
(Denmark) Ann-Lou Jorgensen (Denmark) Rikke Olsen | 15 | 15
(Germany) Nicole Grether (Germany) Juliane Schenk | 12 | 10
(Denmark) Pernille Harder (Denmark) Mette Schjoldager | 4 | 9
(Netherlands) Mia Audina (Netherlands) Lotte Bruil | 15 | 15

Final
(Denmark) Ann-Lou Jorgensen (Denmark) Rikke Olsen | 0 | 1
(Netherlands) Mia Audina (Netherlands) Lotte Bruil | 15 | 15

=== Mixed doubles ===
Semifinals
(England) Nathan Robertson (England) Gail Emms | 17 | 17
(Denmark) Jens Eriksen (Denmark) Mette Schjoldager | 16 | 14
(Sweden) Fredrik Bergström (Sweden) Johanna Persson | 3 | 10
(Denmark) Jonas Rasmussen (Denmark) Rikke Olsen | 15 | 15

Final
(England) Nathan Robertson (England) Gail Emms | 15 | 8 | 15
(Denmark) Jonas Rasmussen (Denmark) Rikke Olsen | 3 | 15 | 5

== Medal table ==
| Pos | Country | Gold | Silver | Bronze | Total |
|---|---|---|---|---|---|
| 1 | Denmark | 3 | 3 | 5 | 11 |
| 2 | Netherlands | 2 | 1 | 1 | 4 |
| 3 | England | 1 | 1 | 0 | 2 |
| 4 | France | 0 | 1 | 0 | 1 |
| 5 | Germany | 0 | 0 | 3 | 3 |
| 6 | Poland | 0 | 0 | 1 | 1 |
| 6 | Sweden | 0 | 0 | 1 | 1 |
