= 2000 Uber Cup group stage =

Badminton team Tournament in Kuala Lumpur

The 2000 Uber Cup group stage was held at Putra Indoor Stadium in Kuala Lumpur, Malaysia, from 11 to 15 May 2000.

The group stage was first stage of the tournament where only the two highest-placing teams in each of the two groups advanced to the knockout stage.

== Draw ==
The original draw for the tournament was conducted on 31 March 2000. The 8 teams will be drawn into two groups each containing four teams.

=== Group composition ===
Group
Group A	Group B
Denmark; Indonesia; Japan; Malaysia (Host)	China; South Korea; Netherlands; Sweden

== Group A ==
Pos	Team	Pld	W	L	GF	GA	GD	PF	PA	PD	Pts	Qualification
1	Denmark	3	3	0	24	10	+14	375	254	+121	3	Advance to semi-finals
2	Indonesia	3	2	1	20	14	+6	344	299	+45	2	Advance to semi-finals
3	Japan	3	1	2	15	17	−2	295	330	−35	1	
4	Malaysia (H)	3	0	3	7	25	−18	240	371	−131	0	

Source: The Straits Times
(H) Host

=== Indonesia vs Japan ===
Indonesia
3
Putra Stadium
11 May 2000, 18:30 UTC+8

Japan
2

			1	2	3
1	(Indonesia) (Japan)	Lidya Djaelawijaya; Yasuko Mizui	5; 11	4; 11
2	(Indonesia) (Japan)	Deyana Lomban / Eliza Nathanael; Yoshiko Iwata / Haruko Matsuda	15; 8	15; 6
3	(Indonesia) (Japan)	Ellen Angelina; Ida Takako	11; 1	11; 5
4	(Indonesia) (Japan)	Eti Tantra / Cynthia Tuwankotta; Naomi Murakami / Chikako Nakayama	15; 4	15; 13
5	(Indonesia) (Japan)	Yuli Marfuah; Miho Tanaka	8; 11	9; 11

=== Denmark vs Malaysia ===
Denmark
4
Putra Stadium
11 May 2000, 18:30 UTC+8

Malaysia
1

			1	2	3
1	(Denmark) (Malaysia)	Camilla Martin; Ng Mee Fen	11; 0	11; 4
2	(Denmark) (Malaysia)	Helene Kirkegaard / Rikke Olsen; Lim Pek Siah / Joanne Quay	15; 9	15; 4
3	(Denmark) (Malaysia)	Mette Sørensen; Wong Miew Kheng	11; 9	11; 7
4	(Denmark) (Malaysia)	Ann-Lou Jørgensen / Mette Schjoldager; Ang Li Peng / Chor Hooi Yee	8; 15	1; 15
5	(Denmark) (Malaysia)	Mette Pedersen; Woon Sze Mei	11; 3	11; 4

=== Indonesia vs Denmark ===
Indonesia
1
Putra Stadium
13 May 2000, 18:30 UTC+8

Denmark
4

			1	2	3
1	(Indonesia) (Denmark)	Lidya Djaelawijaya; Camilla Martin	3; 11	2; 11
2	(Indonesia) (Denmark)	Eliza Nathanael / Deyana Lomban; Helene Kirkegaard / Rikke Olsen	15; 12	10; 15	6; 15
3	(Indonesia) (Denmark)	Ellen Angelina; Mette Sørensen	4; 11	9; 11
4	(Indonesia) (Denmark)	Zelin Resiana / Minarti Timur; Pernille Harder / Majken Vange	15; 10	7; 15	15; 5
5	(Indonesia) (Denmark)	Ninik Masrikah; Mette Pedersen	11; 8	4; 11	1; 11

=== Japan vs Malaysia ===
Japan
3
Putra Stadium
13 May 2000, 18:30 UTC+8

Malaysia
2

			1	2	3
1	(Japan) (Malaysia)	Yasuko Mizui; Ng Mee Fen	11; 6	11; 1
2	(Japan) (Malaysia)	Yoshiko Iwata / Haruko Matsuda; Lim Pek Siah / Joanne Quay	13; 15	11; 15
3	(Japan) (Malaysia)	Ida Takako; Wong Miew Kheng	11; 5	11; 0
4	(Japan) (Malaysia)	Naomi Murakami / Chikako Nakayama; Ang Li Peng / Chor Hooi Yee	15; 10	11; 15	15; 17
5	(Japan) (Malaysia)	Miho Tanaka; Woon Sze Mei	12; 10	11; 4

=== Denmark vs Japan ===
Denmark
3
Putra Stadium
15 May 2000, 18:30 UTC+8

Japan
2

			1	2	3
1	(Denmark) (Japan)	Camilla Martin; Yasuko Mizui	11; 3	11; 1
2	(Denmark) (Japan)	Helene Kirkegaard / Rikke Olsen; Yoshiko Iwata / Haruko Matsuda	15; 7	15; 3
3	(Denmark) (Japan)	Mette Sørensen; Ida Takako	11; 3	11; 1
4	(Denmark) (Japan)	Majken Vange / Pernille Harder; Naomi Murakami / Chikako Nakayama	15; 8	4; 15	14; 17
5	(Denmark) (Japan)	Mette Pedersen; Miho Tanaka	7; 11	10; 12

=== Indonesia vs Malaysia ===
Indonesia
5
Putra Stadium
15 May 2000, 18:30 UTC+8

Malaysia
0

			1	2	3
1	(Indonesia) (Malaysia)	Lidya Djaelawijaya; Ng Mee Fen	11; 6	11; 9
2	(Indonesia) (Malaysia)	Deyana Lomban / Eliza Nathanael; Lim Pek Siah / Joanne Quay	15; 2	15; 11
3	(Indonesia) (Malaysia)	Ellen Angelina; Wong Miew Kheng	11; 5	12; 10
4	(Indonesia) (Malaysia)	Eti Tantra / Cynthia Tuwankotta; Ang Li Peng / Chor Hooi Yee	15; 3	15; 9
5	(Indonesia) (Malaysia)	Yuli Marfuah; Wong Pei Tty	11; 5	6; 11	11; 1

== Group B ==
Pos	Team	Pld	W	L	GF	GA	GD	PF	PA	PD	Pts	Qualification
1	China	3	3	0	30	1	+29	385	94	+291	3	Advance to semi-finals
2	South Korea	3	2	1	20	12	+8	302	255	+47	2	Advance to semi-finals
3	Netherlands	3	1	2	9	25	−16	218	378	−160	1	
4	Sweden	3	0	3	6	27	−21	212	390	−178	0	

Source: The Straits Times

=== China vs Sweden ===
China
5
Putra Stadium
12 May 2000, 18:30 UTC+8

Sweden
0

			1	2	3
1	(China) (Sweden)	Gong Zhichao; Margit Borg	11; 7	11; 1
2	(China) (Sweden)	Dai Yun; Karolina Ericsson	11; 3	11; 0
3	(China) (Sweden)	Gong Ruina; Sara Persson	11; 1	11; 4
4	(China) (Sweden)	Ge Fei / Gu Jun; Anna Lundin / Johanna Persson	15; 0	15; 2
5	(China) (Sweden)	Yang Wei / Huang Nanyan; Johanna Holgersson / Sara Persson	15; 3	15; 1

=== South Korea vs Sweden ===
South Korea
5
Putra Stadium
12 May 2000, 18:30 UTC+8

Netherlands
0

			1	2	3
1	(South Korea) (Netherlands)	Kim Ji-hyun; Judith Meulendijks	4; 11	11; 4	11; 9
2	(South Korea) (Netherlands)	Lee Kyung-won; Karina de Wit	11; 1	11; 3
3	(South Korea) (Netherlands)	Kim Kyung-ran; Lonneke Janssen	11; 3	11; 5
4	(South Korea) (Netherlands)	Lee Hyo-jung / Yim Kyung-jin; Lotte Jonathans / Nicole van Hooren	15; 5	15; 11
5	(South Korea) (Netherlands)	Chung Jae-hee / Lee Kyung-won; Carolien Glebbeek / Betty Krab	15; 2	15; 0

=== China vs Netherlands ===
China
5
Putra Stadium
14 May 2000, 18:30 UTC+8

Netherlands
0

			1	2	3
1	(China) (Netherlands)	Dai Yun; Judith Meulendijks	11; 3	7; 11	11; 7
2	(China) (Netherlands)	Huang Nanyan / Yang Wei; Lotte Jonathans / Nicole van Hooren	15; 4	15; 2
3	(China) (Netherlands)	Ye Zhaoying; Karina de Wit	11; 1	11; 0
4	(China) (Netherlands)	Gao Ling / Qin Yiyuan; Carolien Glebbeek / Betty Krab	15; 0	15; 0
5	(China) (Netherlands)	Gong Ruina; Lonneke Janssen	11; 6	11; 0

=== South Korea vs Sweden ===
South Korea
5
Putra Stadium
14 May 2000, 18:30 UTC+8

Sweden
0

			1	2	3
1	(South Korea) (Sweden)	Kim Ji-hyun; Margit Borg	6; 11	13; 12	11; 7
2	(South Korea) (Sweden)	Lee Kyung-won; Karolina Ericsson	11; 2	11; 7
3	(South Korea) (Sweden)	Kim Kyung-ran; Johanna Holgersson	11; 7	11; 0
4	(South Korea) (Sweden)	Lee Hyo-jung / Yim Kyung-jin; Anna Lundin / Johanna Persson	15; 8	15; 9
5	(South Korea) (Sweden)	Chung Jae-hee / Lee Kyung-won; Margit Borg / Johanna Holgersson	15; 5	15; 7

=== China vs South Korea ===
China
5
Putra Stadium
15 May 2000, 18:30 UTC+8

South Korea
0

			1	2	3
1	(China) (South Korea)	Gong Zhichao; Si Jin-sun	11; 3	11; 4
2	(China) (South Korea)	Dai Yun; Jung Yeon-kyung	11; 3	11; 2
3	(China) (South Korea)	Gong Ruina; Kim So-yeon	11; 3	11; 2
4	(China) (South Korea)	Qin Yiyuan / Gao Ling; Si Jin-sun / Lee Hyo-jung	15; 5	15; 8
5	(China) (South Korea)	Ge Fei / Gu Jun; Jung Yeon-kyung / Kim So-yeon	15; 2	15; 6

=== Netherlands vs Sweden ===
Netherlands
3
Putra Stadium
15 May 2000, 18:30 UTC+8

Sweden
2

			1	2	3
1	(Netherlands) (Sweden)	Judith Meulendijks; Margit Borg	11; 6	8; 11	7; 11
2	(Netherlands) (Sweden)	Karina de Wit; Karolina Ericsson	7; 11	6; 11
3	(Netherlands) (Sweden)	Lonneke Janssen; Johanna Holgersson	5; 11	13; 11	13; 11
4	(Netherlands) (Sweden)	Lotte Jonathans / Nicole van Hooren; Anna Lundin / Johanna Persson	15; 9	15; 13
5	(Netherlands) (Sweden)	Lonneke Janssen / Judith Meulendijks; Margit Borg / Johanna Holgersson	15; 2	15; 8
