= 2000 Uber Cup knockout stage =

2000 Knockout stage of the Thomas Cup badminton team championship

The knockout stage for the 2000 Uber Cup in Kuala Lumpur began on 17 May 2000 with the semi-finals and ended on 20 May 2000 with the final.

== Qualified teams ==
The top two placed teams from each of the two groups qualified for this stage.

| Group | Winners | Runners-up |
|---|---|---|
| A | Denmark | Indonesia |
| B | China | South Korea |

== Bracket ==
Semi-finals
Denmark | 3
South Korea | 0
Indonesia | 0
China | 3

Final
Denmark | 0
China | 3

== Semi-finals ==
=== Semi-final 1 ===
South Korea
0
Putra Stadium
17 May 2000, 18:30 UTC+8

Denmark
3

| | | | 1 | 2 | 3 |
|---|---|---|---|---|---|---|
| 1 | (South Korea) (Denmark) | Kim Ji-hyun; Camilla Martin | 5; 11 | 7; 11 |
| 2 | (South Korea) (Denmark) | Lee Kyung-won; Mette Sorensen | 8; 11 | 3; 11 |
| 3 | (South Korea) (Denmark) | Chung Jae-hee / Lee Hyo-jung; Helene Kirkegaard / Rikke Olsen | 5; 15 | 6; 15 |
| 4 | (South Korea) (Denmark) | Kim Kyung-ran; Mette Pedersen | | | | not played |
| 5 | (South Korea) (Denmark) | Lee Kyung-won / Yim Kyung-jin; Camilla Martin / Mette Schjoldager | | | | not played |

=== Semi-final 2 ===
China
3
Putra Stadium
17 May 2000, 18:30 UTC+8

Indonesia
0

| | | | 1 | 2 | 3 |
|---|---|---|---|---|---|---|
| 1 | (China) (Indonesia) | Gong Zhichao; Ellen Angelina | 11; 2 | 11; 1 |
| 2 | (China) (Indonesia) | Ge Fei / Gu Jun; Deyana Lomban / Eliza Nathanael | 15; 9 | 15; 7 |
| 3 | (China) (Indonesia) | Dai Yun; Yuli Marfuah | 11; 6 | 11; 4 |
| 4 | (China) (Indonesia) | Gao Ling / Qin Yiyuan; Etty Tantri / Cynthia Tuwankotta | | | | not played |
| 5 | (China) (Indonesia) | Ye Zhaoying; Ninik Masrikah | | | | not played |

== Final ==
China
3
Putra Stadium
20 May 2000, 18:30 UTC+8

Denmark
0

| | | | 1 | 2 | 3 |
|---|---|---|---|---|---|---|
| 1 | (China) (Denmark) | Gong Zhichao; Camilla Martin | 11; 9 | 11; 5 |
| 2 | (China) (Denmark) | Ge Fei / Gu Jun; Helene Kirkegaard / Rikke Olsen | 15; 2 | 15; 9 |
| 3 | (China) (Denmark) | Dai Yun; Mette Sorensen | 11; 8 | 11; 1 |
| 4 | (China) (Denmark) | Gao Ling / Qin Yiyuan; Ann-Lou Jørgensen / Mette Schjoldager | | | | not played |
| 5 | (China) (Denmark) | Ye Zhaoying; Mette Pedersen | | | | not played |
