= Martin Lundgaard Hansen =

Danish badminton player (born 1972)

Personal information
- Born: 11 October 1972 (age 54) Kolding, Denmark
- Height: 1.86 m (6 ft 1 in)
- Weight: 78 kg (172 lb)

Sport
- Country: Denmark
- Sport: Badminton
- Handedness: Right

Men's doubles
- Highest ranking: 1
- BWF profile
Medal record
Men's badminton
Representing Denmark
World Championships
Bronze medal – third place	2006 Madrid	Men's doubles
World Cup
Bronze medal – third place	2005 Yiyang	Men's doubles
Sudirman Cup
Bronze medal – third place	2005 Beijing	Mixed team
Bronze medal – third place	2003 Eindhoven	Mixed team
Bronze medal – third place	2001 Seville	Mixed team
Thomas Cup
Silver medal – second place	2006 Sendai & Tokyo	Men's team
Silver medal – second place	2004 Jakarta	Men's team
Bronze medal – third place	2002 Guangzhou	Men's team
Bronze medal – third place	2000 Kuala Lumpur	Men's team
European Championships
Gold medal – first place	2006 Den Bosch	Men's doubles
Gold medal – first place	2004 Geneva	Men's doubles
Gold medal – first place	2002 Malmö	Men's doubles
Silver medal – second place	2008 Herning	Men's doubles
European Mixed Team Championships
Gold medal – first place	2008 Herning	Mixed team
Gold medal – first place	2006 Den Bosch	Mixed team
Gold medal – first place	2004 Geneva	Mixed team
Gold medal – first place	2002 Malmö	Mixed team
Gold medal – first place	2000 Glasgow	Mixed team
Gold medal – first place	1996 Herning	Mixed team
European Men's Team Championships
Gold medal – first place	2008 Almere	Men's team
Gold medal – first place	2006 Thessalonica	Men's team
European Junior Championships
Gold medal – first place	1991 Budapest	Boys' doubles
Bronze medal – third place	1991 Budapest	Mixed team

Martin Lundgaard Hansen (born 11 October 1972) is a Danish badminton player. He started his career in badminton as a singles player, and competed in the 1993 IBF World Championships. But as the years went by, he made a choice to play doubles. Teamed-up with Lars Paaske, they emerged as the men's doubles champion at the 1999, 2001 Denmark Open, and in 2000, he and Paaske participated at the Olympic Games. The career highlights for Hansen was when he partnered with Jens Eriksen. The duo won the 2004 and 2006 All England Open, won gold at the European Championships, and was at the time a half years as No.1 in the world.

== Career ==
=== 2000 Summer Olympics ===
Hansen made his debut at the Olympic Games in 2000 Sydney, competed in the men's doubles event partnered with Lars Paaske. He and Paaske beat the Bulgarian pair Mikhail Popov and Svetoslav Stojanov in the first round, but was defeated by Rexy Mainaky and Ricky Subagja of Indonesia in the second round.

=== 2004 Summer Olympics ===
Hansen competed in badminton at the 2004 Summer Olympics in the men's doubles with partner Jens Eriksen. They had a bye in the first round and defeated Howard Bach/Kevin Han of the United States in the second. In the quarter-finals, Hansen and Eriksen beat the second seeded from China Cai Yun and Fu Haifeng 3–15, 15–11, 15–8. They lost the semi-final to Lee Dong-soo and Yoo Yong-sung of Korea 15–9, 5–15, 3–15 and the bronze medal match against Eng Hian and Flandy Limpele of Indonesia 13–15, 7-15 to finish fourth place.

=== 2008 Summer Olympics ===
Hansen again qualified to compete at the Olympic Games for three consecutive times, and was partnered with Jens Eriksen. The duo were defeated in the early stage by the second seeded Cai Yun and Fu Haifeng with the score 12–21, 11–21.

== Achievements ==
=== World Championships ===
Men's doubles
Year	Venue	Partner	Opponent	Score	Result
2006	Palacio de Deportes de la Comunidad, Madrid, Spain	(Denmark) Jens Eriksen	(China) Cai Yun (China) Fu Haifeng	21–23, 16–21	Bronze

=== World Cup ===
Men's doubles
Year	Venue	Partner	Opponent	Score	Result
2005	Olympic Park, Yiyang, China	(Denmark) Jens Eriksen	(China) Cai Yun (China) Fu Haifeng	14–21, 12–21	Bronze

=== European Championships ===
Men's doubles
Year	Venue	Partner	Opponent	Score	Result
2002	Baltiska hallen Malmö, Sweden	(Denmark) Jens Eriksen	(England) Anthony Clark (England) Nathan Robertson	7–4, 1–7, 7–3, 2–7, 7–3	Gold
2004	Queue d’Arve Sport Center; Geneva, Switzerland	(Denmark) Jens Eriksen	(England) Anthony Clark (England) Nathan Robertson	15–3, 15–9	Gold
2006	Maaspoort Sports and Events; Den Bosch, Netherlands	(Denmark) Jens Eriksen	(Denmark) Mathias Boe (Denmark) Carsten Mogensen	21–15, 21–17	Gold
2008	Messecenter; Herning, Denmark	(Denmark) Jens Eriksen	(Denmark) Lars Paaske (Denmark) Jonas Rasmussen	19–21, 16–21	Silver

=== European Junior Championships ===
Boys' doubles
Year	Venue	Partner	Opponent	Score	Result
1991	BMTE-Törley impozáns sportcsarnokában, Budapest, Hungary	(Denmark) Peter Christensen	(Soviet Union) Vladislav Druzchenko (Soviet Union) Valeriy Strelcov	15–7, 15–10	Gold

=== BWF Superseries ===
The BWF Superseries, launched on 14 December 2006 and implemented in 2007, is a series of elite badminton tournaments, sanctioned by Badminton World Federation (BWF). BWF Superseries has two level such as Superseries and Superseries Premier. A season of Superseries features twelve tournaments around the world, which introduced since 2011, with successful players invited to the Superseries Finals held at the year end.

Men's doubles
Year	Tournament	Partner	Opponent	Score	Result
2007	Swiss Open	(Denmark) Jens Eriksen	(Malaysia) Koo Kien Keat (Malaysia) Tan Boon Heong	21–17, 16–21, 12–21	(silver) Runner-up
2007	Denmark Open	(Denmark) Jens Eriksen	(Malaysia) Koo Kien Keat (Malaysia) Tan Boon Heong	21–14, 14–21, 12–21	(silver) Runner-up

=== IBF World Grand Prix ===
The World Badminton Grand Prix sanctioned by International Badminton Federation (IBF) since 1983.

Men's doubles
Year	Tournament	Partner	Opponent	Score	Result
1999	Dutch Open	(Denmark) Lars Paaske	(Malaysia) Choong Tan Fook (Malaysia) Lee Wan Wah	4–15, 15–6, 9–15	(silver) Runner-up
1999	Denmark Open	(Denmark) Lars Paaske	(Denmark) Jim Laugesen (Denmark) Michael Søgaard	15–13, 15–10	(gold) Winner
2001	Japan Open	(Denmark) Lars Paaske	(Indonesia) Sigit Budiarto (Indonesia) Candra Wijaya	7–15, 11–15	(silver) Runner-up
2001	Dutch Open	(Denmark) Lars Paaske	(Denmark) Jesper Christensen (Denmark) Jesper Larsen	4–7, 7–3, 5–7, 7–4, 5–7	(silver) Runner-up
2001	Denmark Open	(Denmark) Lars Paaske	(Denmark) Jim Laugesen (Denmark) Michael Søgaard	7–5, 3–7, 6–8, 7–3, 7–1	(gold) Winner
2002	Swiss Open	(Denmark) Jens Eriksen	(South Korea) Lee Dong-soo (South Korea) Yoo Yong-sung	7–5, 5–7, 2–7, 5–7	(silver) Runner-up
2002	Dutch Open	(Denmark) Jens Eriksen	(South Korea) Ha Tae-kwon (South Korea) Kim Dong-moon	8–15, 8–15	(silver) Runner-up
2003	Singapore Open	(Denmark) Jens Eriksen	(Denmark) Lars Paaske (Denmark) Jonas Rasmussen	15–9, 15–10	(gold) Winner
2004	All England Open	(Denmark) Jens Eriksen	(Malaysia) Choong Tan Fook (Malaysia) Lee Wan Wah	9–15, 15–13, 15–3	(gold) Winner
2004	Singapore Open	(Denmark) Jens Eriksen	(Indonesia) Luluk Hadiyanto (Indonesia) Alvent Yulianto	2–15, 9–15	(silver) Runner-up
2005	Korea Open	(Denmark) Jens Eriksen	(Indonesia) Sigit Budiarto (Indonesia) Candra Wijaya	7–15, 15–13, 15–13	(gold) Winner
2005	German Open	(Denmark) Jens Eriksen	(China) Cai Yun (China) Fu Haifeng	15–6, 3–15, 10–15	(silver) Runner-up
2005	Japan Open	(Denmark) Jens Eriksen	(Indonesia) Sigit Budiarto (Indonesia) Candra Wijaya	15–10, 15–3	(gold) Winner
2005	Hong Kong Open	(Denmark) Jens Eriksen	(China) Cai Yun (China) Fu Haifeng	13–15, 9–15	(silver) Runner-up
2005	China Open	(Denmark) Jens Eriksen	(Indonesia) Sigit Budiarto (Indonesia) Candra Wijaya	16–17, 15–11, 13–15	(silver) Runner-up
2006	All England Open	(Denmark) Jens Eriksen	(Malaysia) Choong Tan Fook (Malaysia) Lee Wan Wah	15–6, 14–17, 15–2	(gold) Winner
2006	China Masters	(Denmark) Jens Eriksen	(China) Cai Yun (China) Fu Haifeng	21–17, 21–17	(gold) Winner

Mixed doubles
Year	Tournament	Partner	Opponent	Score	Result
1999	Dutch Open	(Denmark) Pernille Harder	(China) Chen Qiqiu (China) Chen Lin	11–15, 15–9, 10–15	(silver) Runner-up

=== IBF International ===
Men's singles
Year	Tournament	Opponent	Score	Result
1994	Portugal International	(Denmark) Jan Jørgensen	15–6, 15–8	(gold) Winner
1994	Hungarian International	(England) Robert Nock	15–13, 15–11	(gold) Winner
1995	Portugal International	(Denmark) Henrik Sørensen	15–7, 15–9	(gold) Winner
1995	Amor International	(Denmark) Peter Rasmussen	7–15, 9–15	(silver) Runner-up

Men's doubles
Year	Tournament	Partner	Opponent	Score	Result
1990	Amor International	(Denmark) Michael Bisgaard	(Denmark) Claus Simonsen (Denmark) Morten Sandal	5–15, 15–8, 12–15	(silver) Runner-up
1991	Norwegian International	(Denmark) Christian Jakobsen	(Sweden) Jan-Eric Antonsson (Sweden) Stellan Österberg	6–15, 5–15	(silver) Runner-up
1992	Norwegian International	(Denmark) Michael Søgaard	(Sweden) Rikard Ronnblom (Sweden) Erik Soderberg	15–6, 15–7	(gold) Winner
1995	Portugal International	(Denmark) Henrik Sørensen	(Denmark) Jan Jørgensen (Denmark) Peder Nissen	15–7, 15–4	(gold) Winner
1997	BMW Open	(Denmark) Janek Roos	(Indonesia) Dharma Gunawi (Indonesia) Yoseph Phoa	15–9, 15–10	(gold) Winner
1998	Norwegian International	(Denmark) Michael Lamp	(Denmark) Jesper Mikla (Denmark) Lars Paaske	9–15, 5–15	(silver) Runner-up
1998	Scottish International	(Denmark) Michael Lamp	(England) Anthony Clark (England) Ian Sullivan	15–10, 15–5	(gold) Winner

Mixed doubles
Year	Tournament	Partner	Opponent	Score	Result
1991	Amor International	(Denmark) Rikke Broen	(Netherlands) Alex Meijer (Netherlands) Nicole van Hooren	9–15, 11–15	(silver) Runner-up
1994	Portugal International	(Denmark) Rikke Olsen	(Denmark) Thomas Damgaard (Denmark) Helene Kirkegaard	15–12, 15–7	(gold) Winner
