= Jens Eriksen =

Danish badminton player (born 1969)

Personal information
- Born: Jens Dyrløv Eriksen; 30 December 1969 (age 56) Glostrup, Hovedstaden, Denmark
- Height: 1.91 m (6 ft 3 in)
- Weight: 82 kg (181 lb; 12.9 st)

Sport
- Country: Denmark
- Sport: Badminton
- Coached by: Steen Pedersen

Men's & mixed doubles
- Highest ranking: 1 (MD); 1 (XD)
- BWF profile
Medal record
Men's badminton
Representing Denmark
Olympic Games
Bronze medal – third place	2004 Athens	Mixed doubles
World Championships
Silver medal – second place	1997 Glasgow	Mixed doubles
Silver medal – second place	1995 Lausanne	Mixed doubles
Bronze medal – third place	2006 Madrid	Men's doubles
Bronze medal – third place	2001 Seville	Mixed doubles
World Cup
Bronze medal – third place	2005 Yiyang	Men's doubles
Bronze medal – third place	2005 Yiyang	Mixed doubles
Sudirman Cup
Silver medal – second place	1999 Copenhagen	Mixed team
Bronze medal – third place	2005 Beijing	Mixed team
Bronze medal – third place	2003 Eindhoven	Mixed team
Bronze medal – third place	2001 Seville	Mixed team
Bronze medal – third place	1997 Glasgow	Mixed team
Bronze medal – third place	1995 Lausanne	Mixed team
Thomas Cup
Silver medal – second place	2006 Sendai & Tokyo	Men's team
Silver medal – second place	2004 Jakarta	Men's team
Bronze medal – third place	2002 Guangzhou	Men's team
Bronze medal – third place	2000 Kuala Lumpur	Men's team
Bronze medal – third place	1998 Hong Kong	Men's team
European Championships
Gold medal – first place	2006 Den Bosch	Men's doubles
Gold medal – first place	2004 Geneva	Men's doubles
Gold medal – first place	2002 Malmö	Men's doubles
Gold medal – first place	2002 Malmö	Mixed doubles
Gold medal – first place	2000 Glasgow	Men's doubles
Silver medal – second place	2008 Herning	Men's doubles
Silver medal – second place	2006 Den Bosch	Mixed doubles
Silver medal – second place	2000 Glasgow	Mixed doubles
Bronze medal – third place	2004 Geneva	Mixed doubles
Bronze medal – third place	1994 Den Bosch	Men's doubles
European Mixed Team Championships
Gold medal – first place	2008 Herning	Mixed team
Gold medal – first place	2006 Den Bosch	Mixed team
Gold medal – first place	2004 Geneva	Mixed team
Gold medal – first place	2002 Malmö	Mixed team
Gold medal – first place	2000 Glasgow	Mixed team
Gold medal – first place	1998 Sofia	Mixed team
Gold medal – first place	1996 Herning	Mixed team
Silver medal – second place	1994 Den Bosch	Mixed team
European Men's Team Championships
Gold medal – first place	2008 Almere	Men's team
Gold medal – first place	2006 Thessalonica	Men's team

Jens Dyrløv Eriksen (born 30 December 1969) is a badminton player from Denmark. He competed in four consecutive Olympic Games from 1996 to 2008, and won a mixed doubles bronze medal in 2004 partnered with Mette Schjoldager. At the World Championships, Eriksen won two silvers in 1995 and 1997, and also two bronze medals in 2001 and 2006.

== Career ==
=== 2004 Olympics ===
He played badminton at the 2004 Summer Olympics in men's doubles and mixed doubles.

In men's doubles, Eriksen and his partner Martin Lundgaard Hansen had a bye in the first round and defeated Howard Bach and Kevin Han of the United States in the second. In the quarterfinals, Eriksen and Hansen beat Fu Haifeng and Cai Yun of China 3-15, 15-11, 15-8. They lost the semifinal to Lee Dong-soo and Yoo Yong-sung of Korea 9-15, 15-5, 15-3 and the bronze medal match against Eng Hian and Flandy Limpele of Indonesia 15-13, 15-7 to finish fourth place.

He also competed in mixed doubles with partner Mette Schjoldager. They defeated Svetoslav Stoyanov and Victoria Wright of France in the first round and Kim Yong-hyun and Lee Hyo-jung of Korea in the second. In the quarterfinals, Eriksen and Schjoldager beat Nova Widianto and Vita Marissa of Indonesia 15-12, 15-8 to advance to the semifinals. There, they lost to Zhang Jun and Gao Ling of China 15-9, 15-5. In the bronze medal match, they defeated fellow Danish pair Jonas Rasmussen and Rikke Olsen 15-5, 15-5 to win the bronze medal.

== Achievements ==
=== Olympic Games ===
Mixed doubles
Year	Venue	Partner	Opponent	Score	Result
2004	Goudi Olympic Hall, Athens, Greece	(Denmark) Mette Schjoldager	(Denmark) Jonas Rasmussen (Denmark) Rikke Olsen	15–5, 15–5	Bronze

=== World Championships ===
Men's doubles
Year	Venue	Partner	Opponent	Score	Result
2006	Palacio de Deportes de la Comunidad, Madrid, Spain	(Denmark) Martin Lundgaard Hansen	(China) Cai Yun (China) Fu Haifeng	21–23, 16–21	Bronze

Mixed doubles
Year	Venue	Partner	Opponent	Score	Result
1995	Malley Sports Centre, Lausanne, Switzerland	(Denmark) Helene Kirkegaard	(Denmark) Thomas Lund (Denmark) Marlene Thomsen	2–15, 6–15	Silver
1997	Scotstoun Centre, Glasgow, Scotland	(Denmark) Marlene Thomsen	(China) Liu Yong (China) Ge Fei	5–15, 17–16, 4–15	Silver
2001	Palacio de Deportes de San Pablo, Seville, Spain	(Denmark) Mette Schjoldager	(China) Zhang Jun (China) Gao Ling	2–15, 12–15	Bronze

=== World Cup ===
Men's doubles
Year	Venue	Partner	Opponent	Score	Result
2005	Olympic Park, Yiyang, China	(Denmark) Martin Lundgaard Hansen	(China) Cai Yun (China) Fu Haifeng	14–21, 12–21	Bronze

Mixed doubles
Year	Venue	Partner	Opponent	Score	Result
2005	Olympic Park, Yiyang, China	(Denmark) Mette Schjoldager	(Indonesia) Nova Widianto (Indonesia) Liliyana Natsir	15–21, 18–21	Bronze

=== European Championships ===
Men's doubles
Year	Venue	Partner	Opponent	Score	Result
1994	Maaspoort Sports and Events; Den Bosch, Netherlands	(Denmark) Christian Jakobsen	(England) Simon Archer (England) Chris Hunt	12–15, 7–15, 12–15	Bronze
2000	Kelvin Hall International Sports Arena; Glasgow, Scotland	(Denmark) Jesper Larsen	(Sweden) Peter Axelsson (Sweden) Pär-Gunnar Jönsson	15–7, 15–6	Gold
2002	Baltiska hallen Malmö, Sweden	(Denmark) Martin Lundgaard Hansen	(England) Anthony Clark (England) Nathan Robertson	7–4, 1–7, 7–3, 2–7, 7–3	Gold
2004	Queue d’Arve Sport Center; Geneva, Switzerland	(Denmark) Martin Lundgaard Hansen	(England) Anthony Clark (England) Nathan Robertson	15–3, 15–9	Gold
2006	Maaspoort Sports and Events; Den Bosch, Netherlands	(Denmark) Martin Lundgaard Hansen	(Denmark) Mathias Boe (Denmark) Carsten Mogensen	21–15, 21–17	Gold
2008	Messecenter; Herning, Denmark	(Denmark) Martin Lundgaard Hansen	(Denmark) Lars Paaske (Denmark) Jonas Rasmussen	19–21, 16–21	Silver

Mixed doubles
Year	Venue	Partner	Opponent	Score	Result
2000	Kelvin Hall International Sports Arena; Glasgow, Scotland	(Denmark) Mette Schjoldager	(Denmark) Michael Søgaard (Denmark) Rikke Olsen	7–15, 12–15	Silver
2002	Baltiska hallen Malmö, Sweden	(Denmark) Mette Schjoldager	(England) Nathan Robertson (England) Gail Emms	7–5, 7–3, 7–1	Gold
2004	Queue d’Arve Sport Center; Geneva, Switzerland	(Denmark) Mette Schjoldager	(England) Nathan Robertson (England) Gail Emms	16–17, 14–17	Bronze
2006	Maaspoort Sports and Events; Den Bosch, Netherlands	(Denmark) Mette Schjoldager	(Denmark) Thomas Laybourn (Denmark) Kamilla Rytter Juhl	20–22, 15–21	Silver

=== BWF Superseries ===
The BWF Superseries, which was launched on 14 December 2006 and implemented in 2007, was a series of elite badminton tournaments, sanctioned by the Badminton World Federation (BWF). BWF Superseries levels were Superseries and Superseries Premier. A season of Superseries consisted of twelve tournaments around the world that had been introduced since 2011. Successful players were invited to the Superseries Finals, which were held at the end of each year.

Men's doubles
Year	Tournament	Partner	Opponent	Score	Result
2007	Swiss Open	(Denmark) Martin Lundgaard Hansen	(Malaysia) Koo Kien Keat (Malaysia) Tan Boon Heong	21–17, 16–21, 12–21	(silver) Runner-up
2007	Denmark Open	(Denmark) Martin Lundgaard Hansen	(Malaysia) Koo Kien Keat (Malaysia) Tan Boon Heong	21–14, 14–21, 12–21	(silver) Runner-up

=== IBF World Grand Prix ===
The World Badminton Grand Prix was sanctioned by the International Badminton Federation from 1983 to 2006.

Men's doubles
Year	Tournament	Partner	Opponent	Score	Result
1994	Chinese Taipei Open	(Denmark) Christian Jakobsen	(Indonesia) Rudy Gunawan (Indonesia) Bambang Suprianto	1–15, 8–15	(silver) Runner-up
1994	Scottish Open	(Denmark) Christian Jakobsen	(Russia) Andrey Antropov (Russia) Nikolai Zuyev	14–17, 15–13, 6–15	(silver) Runner-up
1997	German Open	(Denmark) Jesper Larsen	(England) Simon Archer (England) Chris Hunt	15–1, 15–8	(gold) Winner
1997	Dutch Open	(Denmark) Jesper Larsen	(England) Nick Ponting (England) John Quinn	7–15, 15–8, 15–6	(gold) Winner
1997	Denmark Open	(Denmark) Jesper Larsen	(Denmark) Jon Holst-Christensen (Denmark) Michael Søgaard	17–14, 8–15, 13–18	(silver) Runner-up
1998	Hong Kong Open	(Denmark) Jesper Larsen	(Indonesia) Tony Gunawan (Indonesia) Candra Wijaya	10–15, 9–15	(silver) Runner-up
1999	Korea Open	(Denmark) Jesper Larsen	(Indonesia) Eng Hian (Indonesia) Flandy Limpele	15–6, 7–15, 9–15	(silver) Runner-up
1999	Swiss Open	(Denmark) Jesper Larsen	(Denmark) Jim Laugesen (Denmark) Michael Søgaard	15–6, 12–15, 17–16	(gold) Winner
2000	Swiss Open	(Denmark) Jesper Larsen	(South Korea) Ha Tae-kwon (South Korea) Kim Dong-moon	12–15, 2–15	(silver) Runner-up
2000	Denmark Open	(Denmark) Jesper Larsen	(Indonesia) Eng Hian (Indonesia) Flandy Limpele	13–15, 10–15	(silver) Runner-up
2001	Swiss Open	(Denmark) Jesper Larsen	(Denmark) Jim Laugesen (Denmark) Michael Søgaard	7–4, 2–7, 7–1, 1–7, 3–7	(silver) Runner-up
2002	Swiss Open	(Denmark) Martin Lundgaard Hansen	(South Korea) Lee Dong-soo (South Korea) Yoo Yong-sung	7–5, 5–7, 2–7, 5–7	(silver) Runner-up
2002	Dutch Open	(Denmark) Martin Lundgaard Hansen	(South Korea) Ha Tae-kwon (South Korea) Kim Dong-moon	8–15, 8–15	(silver) Runner-up
2003	Singapore Open	(Denmark) Martin Lundgaard Hansen	(Denmark) Lars Paaske (Denmark) Jonas Rasmussen	15–9, 15–10	(gold) Winner
2004	All England Open	(Denmark) Martin Lundgaard Hansen	(Malaysia) Choong Tan Fook (Malaysia) Lee Wan Wah	9–15, 15–13, 15–3	(gold) Winner
2004	Singapore Open	(Denmark) Martin Lundgaard Hansen	(Indonesia) Luluk Hadiyanto (Indonesia) Alvent Yulianto	2–15, 9–15	(silver) Runner-up
2005	Korea Open	(Denmark) Martin Lundgaard Hansen	(Indonesia) Sigit Budiarto (Indonesia) Candra Wijaya	7–15, 15–13, 15–13	(gold) Winner
2005	German Open	(Denmark) Martin Lundgaard Hansen	(China) Cai Yun (China) Fu Haifeng	15–6, 3–15, 10–15	(silver) Runner-up
2005	Japan Open	(Denmark) Martin Lundgaard Hansen	(Indonesia) Sigit Budiarto (Indonesia) Candra Wijaya	15–10, 15–3	(gold) Winner
2005	Hong Kong Open	(Denmark) Martin Lundgaard Hansen	(China) Cai Yun (China) Fu Haifeng	13–15, 9–15	(silver) Runner-up
2005	China Open	(Denmark) Martin Lundgaard Hansen	(Indonesia) Sigit Budiarto (Indonesia) Candra Wijaya	16–17, 15–11, 13–15	(silver) Runner-up
2006	All England Open	(Denmark) Martin Lundgaard Hansen	(Malaysia) Choong Tan Fook (Malaysia) Lee Wan Wah	15–6, 14–17, 15–2	(gold) Winner
2006	China Masters	(Denmark) Martin Lundgaard Hansen	(China) Cai Yun (China) Fu Haifeng	21–17, 21–17	(gold) Winner

Mixed doubles
Year	Tournament	Partner	Opponent	Score	Result
1994	Canadian Open	(Denmark) Rikke Olsen	(Austria) Jürgen Koch (Austria) Irina Serova	7–15, 2–15	(silver) Runner-up
1994	U.S. Open	(Denmark) Rikke Olsen	(China) Zheng Yushen (China) Xu Huaiwen	15–3, 15–4	(gold) Winner
1995	Chinese Taipei Open	(Denmark) Rikke Olsen	(South Korea) Kim Dong-moon (South Korea) Kim Shin-young	15–10, 15–5	(gold) Winner
1995	Russian Open	(Denmark) Marlene Thomsen	(England) Chris Hunt (England) Gillian Gowers	15–3, 18–16	(gold) Winner
1996	German Open	(Denmark) Anne Mette Bille	(Indonesia) Tri Kusharjanto (Indonesia) Minarti Timur	1–15, 6–15	(silver) Runner-up
1996	Hong Kong Open	(Denmark) Marlene Thomsen	(Denmark) Michael Søgaard (Denmark) Rikke Olsen	8–15, 11–15	(silver) Runner-up
1997	Japan Open	(Denmark) Marlene Thomsen	(China) Liu Yong (China) Ge Fei	8–15, 10–15	(silver) Runner-up
1997	Korea Open	(Denmark) Marlene Thomsen	(China) Liu Yong (China) Ge Fei	13–15, 5–15	(silver) Runner-up
1997	Malaysia Open	(Denmark) Marlene Thomsen	(China) Liu Yong (China) Ge Fei	12–15, 12–15	(silver) Runner-up
1997	German Open	(Denmark) Marlene Thomsen	(Denmark) Michael Søgaard (Denmark) Rikke Olsen	15–11, 12–15, 15–6	(gold) Winner
1997	Denmark Open	(Denmark) Marlene Thomsen	(Denmark) Michael Søgaard (Denmark) Rikke Olsen	15–6, 18–14	(gold) Winner
1997	Thailand Open	(Denmark) Marlene Thomsen	(Denmark) Michael Søgaard (Denmark) Rikke Olsen	5–15, 3–15	(silver) Runner-up
1998	Japan Open	(Denmark) Marlene Thomsen	(South Korea) Kim Dong-moon (South Korea) Ra Kyung-min	12–15, 9–15	(silver) Runner-up
1998	Swiss Open	(Denmark) Marlene Thomsen	(Denmark) Michael Søgaard (Denmark) Rikke Olsen	18–13, 8–15, 3–15	(silver) Runner-up
1998	Brunei Open	(Denmark) Marlene Thomsen	(Denmark) Michael Søgaard (Denmark) Rikke Olsen	15–13, 15–6	(gold) Winner
2000	Chinese Taipei Open	(Denmark) Mette Schjoldager	(Denmark) Michael Søgaard (Denmark) Rikke Olsen	5–15, 9–15	(silver) Runner-up
2000	Denmark Open	(Denmark) Mette Schjoldager	(Denmark) Michael Søgaard (Denmark) Rikke Olsen	10–15, 15–8, 10–15	(silver) Runner-up
2000	World Grand Prix Finals	(Denmark) Mette Schjoldager	(Indonesia) Tri Kusharjanto (Indonesia) Minarti Timur	8–7, 7–4, 7–4	(gold) Winner
2001	Swiss Open	(Denmark) Mette Schjoldager	(Denmark) Michael Søgaard (Denmark) Rikke Olsen	7–4, 7–2, 7–5	(gold) Winner
2001	Singapore Open	(Denmark) Mette Schjoldager	(Denmark) Michael Søgaard (Denmark) Rikke Olsen	7–2, 4–7, 7–5, 7–5	(gold) Winner
2002	All England Open	(Denmark) Mette Schjoldager	(South Korea) Kim Dong-moon (South Korea) Ra Kyung-min	3–7, 3–7, 0–7	(silver) Runner-up
2003	Swiss Open	(Denmark) Mette Schjoldager	(South Korea) Kim Yong-hyun (South Korea) Lee Hyo-jung	11–7, 9–11, 11–5	(gold) Winner
2003	Japan Open	(Denmark) Mette Schjoldager	(China) Zhang Jun (China) Gao Ling	11–9, 8–11, 9–11	(silver) Runner-up
2004	China Open	(Denmark) Mette Schjoldager	(China) Chen Qiqiu (China) Zhao Tingting	15–13, 13–15, 15–8	(gold) Winner
2005	Korea Open	(Denmark) Mette Schjoldager	(South Korea) Lee Jae-jin (South Korea) Lee Hyo-jung	14–17, 9–15	(silver) Runner-up
2005	Japan Open	(Denmark) Mette Schjoldager	(Thailand) Sudket Prapakamol (Thailand) Saralee Thungthongkam	13–15, 17–14, 7–15	(silver) Runner-up
2006	Korea Open	(Denmark) Mette Schjoldager	(Indonesia) Nova Widianto (Indonesia) Liliyana Natsir	21–23, 18–21	(silver) Runner-up

=== IBF International ===
Mixed doubles
Year	Tournament	Partner	Opponent	Score	Result
1992	Amor International	(Denmark) Marlene Thomsen	(Netherlands) Ron Michels (Netherlands) Sonja Mellink	9–15, 8–15	(silver) Runner-up
1993	Hamburg Cup	(Denmark) Anne Mette Bille	(Denmark) Christian Jakobsen (Denmark) Marlene Thomsen	15–10, 13–15, 11–15	(silver) Runner-up
