= 2006 European Badminton Championships =

Tournament details
- Dates: 12-16 April 2006
- Venue: Maaspoort
- Location: Den Bosch, Netherlands

Champions
- Men's singles: (Denmark) Peter Gade
- Women's singles: (Germany) Xu Huaiwen
- Men's doubles: (Denmark) Jens Eriksen (Denmark) Martin Lundgaard Hansen
- Women's doubles: (England) Donna Kellogg (England) Gail Emms
- Mixed doubles: (Denmark) Thomas Laybourn (Denmark) Kamilla Rytter Juhl

The 20th European Badminton Championships were held in Den Bosch, Netherlands, between 12 and 16 April 2006.

== Medalists ==
| Event | Gold | Silver | Bronze |
|---|---|---|---|
| Men's singles | (Denmark) Peter Gade | (Denmark) Kenneth Jonassen | (Denmark) Joachim Persson |
| Men's singles | (Denmark) Peter Gade | (Denmark) Kenneth Jonassen | (Denmark) Niels Christian Kaldau |
| Women's singles | (Germany) Xu Huaiwen | (Netherlands) Mia Audina Tjiptawan | (Germany) Juliane Schenk |
| Women's singles | (Germany) Xu Huaiwen | (Netherlands) Mia Audina Tjiptawan | (Netherlands) Yao Jie |
| Men's doubles | (Denmark) Jens Eriksen and Martin Lundgaard Hansen | (Denmark) Carsten Mogensen and Mathias Boe | (England) Robert Blair and Anthony Clark |
| Men's doubles | (Denmark) Jens Eriksen and Martin Lundgaard Hansen | (Denmark) Carsten Mogensen and Mathias Boe | (Poland) Michal Logosz and Robert Mateusiak |
| Women's doubles | (England) Donna Kellogg and Gail Emms | (Germany) Juliane Schenk and Nicole Grether | (Sweden) Elin Bergblom and Johanna Persson |
| Women's doubles | (England) Donna Kellogg and Gail Emms | (Germany) Juliane Schenk and Nicole Grether | (Denmark) Lena Frier Kristiansen and Kamilla Rytter Juhl |
| Mixed doubles | (Denmark) Thomas Laybourn and Kamilla Rytter Juhl | (Denmark) Jens Eriksen and Mette Schjoldager | (Poland) Robert Mateusiak and Nadieżda Kostiuczyk |
| Mixed doubles | (Denmark) Thomas Laybourn and Kamilla Rytter Juhl | (Denmark) Jens Eriksen and Mette Schjoldager | (England) Anthony Clark and Donna Kellogg |
| Teams | Denmark | Netherlands | England |

== Results ==
=== Men's singles ===
Quarterfinals
1 | (Denmark) Peter Gade | 21 | 21
5/8 | (Netherlands) Dicky Palyama | 12 | 18
3/4 | (Germany) Björn Joppien | 21 | 12 | 14
5/8 | (Denmark) Joachim Persson | 15 | 21 | 21
5/8 | (Netherlands) Eric Pang | 18 | 18
3/4 | (Denmark) Niels Christian Kaldau | 21 | 21
5/8 | (Poland) Przemysław Wacha | 15 | 12
2 | (Denmark) Kenneth Jonassen | 21 | 21

Semifinals
1 | (Denmark) Peter Gade | 24 | 21
5/8 | (Denmark) Joachim Persson | 22 | 10
3/4 | (Denmark) Niels Christian Kaldau | 19 | 16
2 | (Denmark) Kenneth Jonassen | 21 | 21

Finals
1 | (Denmark) Peter Gade | 21 | 21
2 | (Denmark) Kenneth Jonassen | 19 | 18

=== Women's singles ===
Quarterfinals
1 | (France) Pi Hongyan | 19 | 20
5/8 | (Germany) Juliane Schenk | 21 | 22
3/4 | (Netherlands) Mia Audina | 21 | 21
(Scotland) Susan Hughes | 18 | 18
5/8 | (Bulgaria) Petya Nedeltcheva | 15 | 16
3/4 | (Netherlands) Yao Jie | 21 | 21
(Denmark) Tine Rasmussen | 14 | 16
2 | (Germany) Xu Huaiwen | 21 | 21

Semifinals
5/8 | (Germany) Juliane Schenk | 14 | 16
3/4 | (Netherlands) Mia Audina | 21 | 21
3/4 | (Netherlands) Yao Jie
2 | (Germany) Xu Huaiwen | wo | wo

Finals
3/4 | (Netherlands) Mia Audina | 21 | 9 | 16
2 | (Germany) Xu Huaiwen | 15 | 21 | 21

=== Men's doubles ===
Semifinals
(Denmark) Jens Eriksen (Denmark) M. Lundgaard Hansen | 21 | 23
(Poland) Robert Mateusiak (Poland) Michal Logosz | 19 | 21
(England) Robert Blair (England) Anthony Clark | 17 | 21 | 18
(Denmark) Carsten Mogensen (Denmark) Mathias Boe | 21 | 11 | 21

Final
(Denmark) Jens Eriksen (Denmark) M. Lundgaard Hansen | 21 | 21
(Denmark) Carsten Mogensen (Denmark) Mathias Boe | 15 | 17

=== Women's doubles ===
Semifinals
(England) Donna Kellogg (England) Gail Emms | 21 | 16 | 21
(Sweden) Elin Bergblom (Sweden) Johanna Persson | 9 | 21 | 15
(Denmark) Lena Frier Kristiansen (Denmark) Kamilla Rytter Juhl | 9 | 21 | 15
(Germany) Juliane Schenk (Germany) Nicole Grether | 21 | 14 | 21

Final
(England) Donna Kellogg (England) Gail Emms | 21 | 21
(Germany) Juliane Schenk (Germany) Nicole Grether | 12 | 10

=== Mixed doubles ===
Semifinals
(Poland) Robert Mateusiak (Poland) Nadieżda Kostiuczyk | 16 | 21 | 21
(Denmark) Thomas Laybourn (Denmark) Kamilla Rytter Juhl | 21 | 14 | 23
(England) Anthony Clark (England) Donna Kellogg | 16 | 14
(Denmark) Jens Eriksen (Denmark) Mette Schjoldager | 21 | 21

Final
(Denmark) Thomas Laybourn (Denmark) Kamilla Rytter Juhl | 22 | 21
(Denmark) Jens Eriksen (Denmark) Mette Schjoldager | 20 | 14

== Medal count ==
| Pos | Country | Gold | Silver | Bronze | Total |
|---|---|---|---|---|---|
| 1 | Denmark | 4 | 3 | 3 | 10 |
| 2 | Germany | 1 | 1 | 1 | 3 |
| 3 | England | 1 | 0 | 3 | 4 |
| 4 | Netherlands | 0 | 2 | 1 | 3 |
| 5 | Poland | 0 | 0 | 2 | 2 |
| 6 | Sweden | 0 | 0 | 1 | 1 |
