= 2006 IBF World Championships – Men's doubles =

Men's doubles at the 2006 IBF World Championships
- Venue: Palacio de Deportes de la Comunidad de Madrid
- Location: Madrid, Spain
- Dates: September 18, 2006 – September 24, 2006

Medalists
gold medal	Fu Haifeng; Cai Yun	China
silver medal	Anthony Clark; Robert Blair	England
bronze medal	Jens Eriksen; Martin Lundgaard Hansen	Denmark
bronze medal	Lars Paaske; Jonas Rasmussen	Denmark

The 2006 Men's doubles brackets and results of the 2006 IBF World Championships.

== Results ==
=== Section 1 ===
First Round
1	(China) Fu Haifeng (China) Cai Yun
Bye; Bye
(Wales) Matthew Hughes (Wales) Martyn Lewis
Bye; Bye
9/16	(Hong Kong) Albertus Susanto Njoto (Hong Kong) Yohan Hadikusumo Wiratama	21	21
(Slovenia) Andrej Pohar (Slovenia) Miha Sepec Jr.	8	9
(Russia) Vladimir Malkov (Russia) Konstantin Khlestov	10	12
(India) Rupesh Kumar K. T. (India) Sanave Thomas	21	21
5/8	(Indonesia) Luluk Hadiyanto (Indonesia) Alvent Yulianto
Bye; Bye
(Australia) Glenn Warfe (Australia) Ross Smith	21	21
(United States) Dean Schoppe (United States) Mathew Fogarty	9	6
9/16	(Germany) Roman Spitko (Germany) Michael Fuchs	21	19	29
(France) Erwin Kehlhoffner (France) Thomas Quere	16	21	27
(Turkey) Ali Kaya (Turkey) Mehmet Tural
(Spain) José Antonio Crespo (Spain) Nicolas Escartin Ara	WO	WO

Second Round
1	(China) Fu (China) Cai	21	21
(Wales) Hughes (Wales) Lewis	14	9
9/16	(Hong Kong) Njoto (Hong Kong) Wiratama	17	21	19
(India) Kumar (India) Thomas	21	19	21
5/8	(Indonesia) Hadiyanto (Indonesia) Yulianto	21	21
(Australia) Warfe (Australia) Smith	10	19
9/16	(Germany) Spitko (Germany) Fuchs	21	21
(Spain) Crespo (Spain) Escartin Ara	7	17

Third Round
1	(China) Fu (China) Cai	21	21
(India) Kumar (India) Thomas	15	16
5/8	(Indonesia) Hadiyanto (Indonesia) Yulianto	21	21
9/16	(Germany) Spitko (Germany) Fuchs	8	11

Quarter Finals
1	(China) Fu (China) Cai	21	21
5/8	(Indonesia) Hadiyanto (Indonesia) Yulianto	13	10

=== Section 2 ===
First Round
3/4	(Denmark) Jens Eriksen (Denmark) Martin Lundgaard Hansen
Bye; Bye
(Switzerland) Michael Andrey (Switzerland) Christian Bösiger
Bye; Bye
9/16	(Japan) Shuichi Sakamoto (Japan) Shintaro Ikeda	21	21
(Canada) Mike Beres (Canada) William Milroy	13	15
(Belarus) Andrei Konakh (Russia) Alexandr Russkikh	21	19	22
(Scotland) David T. Forbes (Scotland) Stewart Kerr	19	21	24
5/8	(Malaysia) Chan Chong Ming (Malaysia) Koo Kien Keat
Bye; Bye
(Belgium) Elie Balligand (Belgium) Frederic Gaspard	8	11
(South Korea) Hwang Ji-man (South Korea) Han Sang-hoon	21	21
9/16	(Poland) Michal Logosz (Poland) Robert Mateusiak	16	21	12
(England) Ian Palethorpe (England) Kristian Roebuck	21	11	21
(Nigeria) Orobosa Okuonghae (Nigeria) Ibrahim Adamu	21	21
(Pakistan) Mir Tahir Ishaq (Pakistan) Ahmed Waqas	13	19

Second Round
3/4	(Denmark) Eriksen (Denmark) Lundgaard Hansen	21	21
(Switzerland) Andrey (Switzerland) Bösiger	9	10
9/16	(Japan) Sakamoto (Japan) Ikeda	21	21
(Scotland) Forbes (Scotland) Kerr	12	11
5/8	(Malaysia) Chan (Malaysia) Koo
(South Korea) Hwang (South Korea) Han	WO	WO
(England) Palethorpe (England) Roebuck	21	21
(Nigeria) Okuonghae (Nigeria) Adamu	5	11

Third Round
3/4	(Denmark) Eriksen (Denmark) Lundgaard Hansen	21	21
9/16	(Japan) Sakamoto (Japan) Ikeda	15	10
(South Korea) Hwang (South Korea) Han	21	21
(England) Palethorpe (England) Roebuck	12	19

Quarter Finals
3/4	(Denmark) Eriksen (Denmark) Lundgaard Hansen	21	24
(South Korea) Hwang (South Korea) Han	17	22

=== Section 3 ===
First Round
(Spain) Rafael Fernandez (Spain) Inigo Serrano
(Austria) Michael Lahnsteiner (Austria) Michael Trojan	WO	WO
(Bulgaria) Vladimir Metodiev (Bulgaria) Stilian Makarski	9	4
9/16	(Japan) Tadashi Ohtsuka (Japan) Keita Masuda	21	21
(Slovenia) Luka Petric (Slovenia) Matevz Srekl	10	16
(Germany) Kristof Hopp (Germany) Ingo Kindervater	21	21
Bye; Bye
5/8	(England) Anthony Clark (England) Robert Blair
(Brazil) Guilherme Kumasaka (Brazil) Guilherme Pardo	6	12
(Thailand) Sudket Prapakamol (Thailand) Patapol Ngernsrisuk	21	21
(Iran) Ali Shahhoseini (Iran) Golam Reza Bagheri	18	16
9/16	(Indonesia) Markis Kido (Indonesia) Hendra Setiawan	21	21
Bye; Bye
(Vietnam) Nguyen Quang Minh (Vietnam) Tran Thanh Hai
Bye; Bye
3/4	(Malaysia) Choong Tan Fook (Malaysia) Lee Wan Wah

Second Round
(Spain) Fernandez (Spain) Serrano	10	9
9/16	(Japan) Ohtsuka (Japan) Masuda	21	21
(Germany) Hopp (Germany) Kindervater	14	13
5/8	(England) Clark (England) Blair	21	21
(Thailand) Prapakamol (Thailand) Ngernsrisuk	20	13
9/16	(Indonesia) Kido (Indonesia) Setiawan	22	21
(Vietnam) Nguyen (Vietnam) Tran	17	15
3/4	(Malaysia) Choong (Malaysia) Lee	21	21

Third Round
9/16	(Japan) Ohtsuka (Japan) Masuda	21	13	18
5/8	(England) Clark (England) Blair	19	21	21
9/16	(Indonesia) Kido (Indonesia) Setiawan	22	21
3/4	(Malaysia) Choong (Malaysia) Lee	20	10

Quarter Finals
5/8	(England) Clark (England) Blair	15	21	21
9/16	(Indonesia) Kido (Indonesia) Setiawan	21	16	17

=== Section 4 ===
First Round
(Chinese Taipei) Tsai Chia-hsin (Chinese Taipei) Hu Chung-hsien	21	21
(Peru) Francisco Ugaz (Peru) Juan Jose Espinosa	12	6
(Poland) Wojciech Szkudlarczyk (Poland) Lukasz Moren	8	8
9/16	(China) Guo Zhendong (China) Xie Zhongbo	21	21
(Spain) Jose Vicente Martinez (Spain) Alejandro Villar	11	16
(Russia) Vitalij Durkin (Russia) Alexandr Nikolaenko	21	21
Bye; Bye
5/8	(Malaysia) Mohd Fairuzizuan Mohd Tazari (Malaysia) Lin Woon Fui
(Denmark) Lars Paaske (Denmark) Jonas Rasmussen	21	21
(Netherlands) Jurgen Wouters (Netherlands) Ruud Bosch	7	15
(Wales) James Phillips (Wales) Joe Morgan	25	21
9/16	(France) Svetoslav Stoyanov (France) Mihail Popov	27	21
Bye; Bye
(Belgium) Frederic Mawet (Belgium) Wouter Claes
Bye; Bye
2	(South Korea) Jung Jae-sung (South Korea) Lee Yong-dae

Second Round
(Chinese Taipei) Tsai (Chinese Taipei) Hu	14	19
9/16	(China) Guo (China) Xie	21	21
(Russia) Durkin (Russia) Nikolaenko	24	11
5/8	(Malaysia) Mohd Tazari (Malaysia) Lin	26	21
(Denmark) Paaske (Denmark) Rasmussen	21	21
(France) Stoyanov (France) Popov	9	14
(Belgium) Mawet (Belgium) Claes	12	12
2	(South Korea) Jung (South Korea) Lee	21	21

Third Round
9/16	(China) Guo (China) Xie	21	16	14
5/8	(Malaysia) Mohd Tazari (Malaysia) Lin	15	21	21
(Denmark) Paaske (Denmark) Rasmussen	21	21
2	(South Korea) Jung (South Korea) Lee	18	14

Quarter Finals
5/8	(Malaysia) Mohd Tazari (Malaysia) Lin	17	19
(Denmark) Paaske (Denmark) Rasmussen	21	21

== Finals ==
Quarterfinals
1	(China) Fu Haifeng (China) Cai Yun	21	21
5/8	(Indonesia) Luluk Hadiyanto (Indonesia) Alvent Yulianto	13	10
3/4	(Denmark) Jens Eriksen (Denmark) Martin Lundgaard Hansen	21	24
(South Korea) Hwang Ji-man (South Korea) Han Sang-hoon	17	22
5/8	(England) Anthony Clark (England) Robert Blair	15	21	21
9/16	(Indonesia) Markis Kido (Indonesia) Hendra Setiawan	21	16	17
5/8	(Malaysia) Mohd Fairuzizuan Mohd Tazari (Malaysia) Lin Woon Fui	17	19
(Denmark) Lars Paaske (Denmark) Jonas Rasmussen	21	21

Semifinals
1	(China) Fu Haifeng (China) Cai Yun	23	21
3/4	(Denmark) Jens Eriksen (Denmark) Martin Lundgaard Hansen	21	16
5/8	(England) Anthony Clark (England) Robert Blair	23	17	21
(Denmark) Lars Paaske (Denmark) Jonas Rasmussen	21	21	17

Finals
1	(China) Fu Haifeng (China) Cai Yun	21	21
5/8	(England) Anthony Clark (England) Robert Blair	9	13
