= Niels Christian Kaldau =

Danish badminton player

Personal information
- Born: 22 December 1974 (age 51)
- Height: 1.83 m (6 ft 0 in)

Sport
- Country: Denmark
- Sport: Badminton
- Handedness: Right
- Event: Men's singles

Men's singles
- BWF profile
Medal record
Men's badminton
Representing Denmark
European Championships
Bronze medal – third place	2006 Den Bosch	Men's singles
European Mixed Team Championships
Gold medal – first place	2006 Den Bosch	Mixed team
European Men's Team Championships
Gold medal – first place	2006 Thessalonica	Men's team

Niels Christian Kaldau (born 22 December 1974) is a male badminton player from Denmark.

== Career ==
Kaldau won the Portuguese Badminton Champs in 1998, 2002 and 2003, the German Open in 2002, the Bitburger Open in 2004 and the Spanish International Badminton Tournament in 2005.

He won the bronze medal at the 2006 European Badminton Championships in men's singles.

== Achievements ==
=== European Championships ===
Men's singles
Year	Venue	Opponent	Score	Result
2006	Maaspoort Sports and Events; Den Bosch, Netherlands	(Denmark) Kenneth Jonassen	19–21, 16–21	Bronze

=== IBF World Grand Prix ===
The World Badminton Grand Prix sanctioned by International Badminton Federation (IBF) from 1983 to 2006.

Men's singles
Year	Tournament	Opponent	Score	Result
2001	German Open	(Denmark) Kenneth Jonassen	1–7, 8–7, 6–8, 7–4, 5–7	(silver) Runner-up
2002	German Open	(Germany) Björn Joppien	15–6, 15–11	(gold) Winner
2005	Thessaloniki World Grand Prix	(Denmark) Anders Boesen	9–15, 15–13, 15–8	(gold) Winner

=== IBF International ===
Men's singles
Year	Tournament	Opponent	Score	Result
1996	Hungarian International	(Denmark) Peter Janum	5–15, 3–15	(silver) Runner-up
1997	Spanish International	(Portugal) Ricardo Fernandes	15–3, 15–9	(gold) Winner
1997	Slovak Open	(Denmark) Soren Hansen	15–5, 15–5	(gold) Winner
1997	Amor International	(Netherlands) Chris Bruil	7–9, 6–9, 9–4, 9–6, 3–9	(silver) Runner-up
1997	Peru International	(Sweden) Rasmus Wengberg	15–17, 12–15	(silver) Runner-up
1997	Iceland International	(Denmark) Joachim Fischer Nielsen	15–12, 15–1	(gold) Winner
1998	Portugal International	(England) Darren Hall	18–16, 15–9	(gold) Winner
1998	French Open	(Netherlands) Joris van Soerland	15–4, 15–6	(gold) Winner
1998	Amor Tournament	(Belgium) Ruud Kuijten	15–12, 15–3	(gold) Winner
1999	Austrian International	(Germany) Rehan Khan	15–10, 15–10	(gold) Winner
2001	Croatian International	(Germany) Oliver Pongratz	11–15, 5–15	(silver) Runner-up
2001	Austrian International	(Denmark) Kenneth Jonassen	10–15, 7–15	(silver) Runner-up
2001	BMW Open	(Germany) Xie Yangchun	7–3, 1–7, 7–8, 7–5, 7–3	(gold) Winner
2002	Portugal International	(Indonesia) Hariawan	7–3, 7–5, 7–4	(gold) Winner
2002	BMW Open	(China) Chen Gang	7–15, 15–8, 14–17	(silver) Runner-up
2003	Portugal International	(Wales) Irwansyah	15–4, 15–13	(gold) Winner
2004	Bitburger Open	(Canada) Bobby Milroy	15–12, 15–3	(gold) Winner
2007	Mauritius International	(Japan) Sho Sasaki	10–21, 3–21	(silver) Runner-up

Men's doubles
Year	Tournament	Partner	Opponent	Score	Result
1995	Austrian International	(Germany) Marek Bujak	(Denmark) Allan Borch (Denmark) Janek Roos	10–15, 9–15	(silver) Runner-up
1997	Peru International	(Netherlands) Gerben Bruijstens	(Canada) Iain Sydie (Sweden) Rasmus Wengberg	7–15, 2–15	(silver) Runner-up
1997	Iceland International	(Denmark) Joachim Fischer Nielsen	(Iceland) Árni Þór Hallgrímsson (Iceland) Broddi Kristjánsson	15–5, 15–7	(gold) Winner

Men's doubles
Year	Tournament	Partner	Opponent	Score	Result
1997	Peru International	(Denmark) Pernille Harder	(Peru) Gustavo Salazar (Peru) Lorena Blanco	15–12, 15–9	(gold) Winner
