= Lars Paaske =

Danish badminton player (born 1976)

Personal information
- Born: 18 January 1976 (age 50) Hørsholm, Denmark
- Height: 1.87 m (6 ft 2 in)

Sport
- Country: Denmark
- Sport: Badminton
- Handedness: Right

Men's doubles
- Highest ranking: 1
- BWF profile
Medal record
Men's badminton
Representing Denmark
World Championships
Gold medal – first place	2003 Birmingham	Men's doubles
Bronze medal – third place	2006 Madrid	Men's doubles
Sudirman Cup
Bronze medal – third place	2005 Beijing	Mixed team
Thomas Cup
Silver medal – second place	2004 Jakarta	Men's team
Bronze medal – third place	2002 Guangzhou	Men's team
Bronze medal – third place	2000 Kuala Lumpur	Men's team
European Championships
Gold medal – first place	2008 Herning	Men's doubles
Gold medal – first place	2010 Manchester	Men's doubles
Bronze medal – third place	2002 Malmö	Men's doubles
Bronze medal – third place	2004 Geneva	Men's doubles
European Mixed Team Championships
Gold medal – first place	2002 Malmö	Mixed team
Gold medal – first place	2004 Geneva	Mixed team
Gold medal – first place	2008 Herning	Mixed team

Lars Paaske (born 18 January 1976) is a badminton player from Denmark.

== Career ==
He competed in badminton at the 2004 Summer Olympics in men's doubles with partner Jonas Rasmussen. After an initial bye in the first round, then were defeated in the next round by Yim Bang-eun and Kim Yong-hyun of Korea. Paaske then competed in the 2008 Summer Olympics in Beijing in men's doubles again with partner Jonas Rasmussen where they were chasing the one medal lacking in their collection: An Olympic medal. The pair lost in the semi-final, and then again in the match for 3rd place to finish with a disappointing 4th spot.

Paaske won the gold medal at the 2008 European Badminton Championships in men's doubles with Jonas Rasmussen.

== History ==
Lars Paaske had his breakthrough with Martin Lundgaard, they won Denmark Open in 1999 and repeated the success 2001.

In 2002 Paaske changed partner and paired with Jonas Rasmussen and this proved to be a good idea. While only in their second season, Passke and Rasmussen won the 2003 World Championship in Birmingham. This was the first time in 20 years that the title was won by Denmark. The same year, Paaske and Rasmussen achieved yet another historical result by winning China Open and were thereby the first Europeans to win the title. The following 12 months Paaske and Rasmussen held the number one position on the world ranking list. Lars Paaske and Jonas Rasmussen have never lost a match when representing the Danish National team in the Thomas Cup.

Lars Paaske played well on National ground, winning the Denmark Open MD title with Jonas Rasmussen in 2004 and 2006 and in 2007 they came second.

In 2008 Paaske became European Champion in MD and now Paaske and Rasmussen are chasing the missing medal in their collection, an Olympic medal. Lars Paaske represented Denmark in Sydney in 2000 together with Martin Lundgaard, in 2004 together with Jonas Rasmussen and in 2008 in Beijing also with Jonas Rasmussen.

In March 2010, Paaske and Rasmussen beat fellow countrymen Boe & Morgenson to win the 2010 All England Open in Men's doubles.

== Achievements ==
=== World Championships ===
Men's doubles
Year	Venue	Partner	Opponent	Score	Result
2003	National Indoor Arena, Birmingham, England	(Denmark) Jonas Rasmussen	(Indonesia) Sigit Budiarto (Indonesia) Candra Wijaya	15–7, 13–15, 15–13	Gold
2006	Palacio de Deportes de la Comunidad de Madrid, Madrid, Spain	(Denmark) Jonas Rasmussen	(England) Robert Blair (England) Anthony Clark	21–23, 21–17, 17–21	Bronze

=== European Championships ===
Men's doubles
Year	Venue	Partner	Opponent	Score	Result
2002	Baltiska Hallen, Malmö, Sweden	(Denmark) Jonas Rasmussen	(England) Anthony Clark (England) Nathan Robertson	3–7, 7–1, 1–7, 6–8	Bronze
2004	Queue d’Arve Sport Center, Geneva, Switzerland	(Denmark) Jonas Rasmussen	(England) Anthony Clark (England) Nathan Robertson	15–11, 5–15, 11–15	Bronze
2008	Messecenter, Herning, Denmark	(Denmark) Jonas Rasmussen	(Denmark) Jens Eriksen (Denmark) Martin Lundgaard Hansen	21–19, 21–16	Gold
2010	Manchester Evening News Arena, Manchester, England	(Denmark) Jonas Rasmussen	(Denmark) Mathias Boe (Denmark) Carsten Mogensen	24–22, 22–20	Gold

=== BWF Superseries ===
The BWF Superseries, launched on 14 December 2006 and implemented in 2007, is a series of elite badminton tournaments, sanctioned by Badminton World Federation (BWF). BWF Superseries has two level such as Superseries and Superseries Premier. A season of Superseries features twelve tournaments around the world, which introduced since 2011, with successful players invited to the Superseries Finals held at the year end.

Men's doubles
Year	Tournament	Partner	Opponent	Score	Result
2008	Malaysia Open	(Denmark) Jonas Rasmussen	(Indonesia) Markis Kido (Indonesia) Hendra Setiawan	10–21, 22–20, 18–21	(silver) Runner-up
2008	Japan Open	(Denmark) Jonas Rasmussen	(Indonesia) Mohammad Ahsan (Indonesia) Bona Septano	21–17, 15–21, 21–13	(gold) Winner
2009	Hong Kong Open	(Denmark) Jonas Rasmussen	(South Korea) Jung Jae-sung (South Korea) Lee Yong-dae	21–13, 15–21, 8–21	(silver) Runner-up
2010	All England Open	(Denmark) Jonas Rasmussen	(Denmark) Mathias Boe (Denmark) Carsten Mogensen	21–23, 21–19, 26–24	(gold) Winner

BWF Super Series Finals tournament
BWF Super Series Premier tournament
BWF Super Series tournament

=== IBF/BWF World Grand Prix ===
The BWF Grand Prix had two levels, the Grand Prix and Grand Prix Gold. It was a series of badminton tournaments sanctioned by the Badminton World Federation (BWF) and played between 2007 and 2017.The World Badminton Grand Prix sanctioned by International Badminton Federation (IBF) from 1983 to 2006.

Men's doubles
Year	Tournament	Partner	Opponent	Score	Result
1999	Dutch Open	(Denmark) Martin Lundgaard Hansen	(Malaysia) Choong Tan Fook (Malaysia) Lee Wan Wah	4–15, 15–6, 9–15	(silver) Runner-up
1999	Denmark Open	(Denmark) Martin Lundgaard Hansen	(Denmark) Jim Laugesen (Denmark) Michael Søgaard	15–13, 15–10	(gold) Winner
2001	Japan Open	(Denmark) Martin Lundgaard Hansen	(Indonesia) Sigit Budiarto (Indonesia) Candra Wijaya	7–15, 11–15	(silver) Runner-up
2001	Dutch Open	(Denmark) Martin Lundgaard Hansen	(Denmark) Jesper Christensen (Denmark) Jesper Larsen	4–7, 7–3, 5–7, 7–4, 5–7	(silver) Runner-up
2001	Denmark Open	(Denmark) Martin Lundgaard Hansen	(Denmark) Jim Laugesen (Denmark) Michael Søgaard	7–5, 3–7, 6–8, 7–3, 7–1	(gold) Winner
2002	German Open	(Denmark) Jonas Rasmussen	(Denmark) Jim Laugesen (Denmark) Michael Søgaard	10–15, 15–9, 15–6	(gold) Winner
2003	Singapore Open	(Denmark) Jonas Rasmussen	(Denmark) Jens Eriksen (Denmark) Martin Lundgaard Hansen	9–15, 10–15	(silver) Runner-up
2003	China Open	(Denmark) Jonas Rasmussen	(Malaysia) Choong Tan Fook (Malaysia) Lee Wan Wah	15–12, 15–10	(gold) Winner
2004	Denmark Open	(Denmark) Jonas Rasmussen	(Indonesia) Markis Kido (Indonesia) Hendra Setiawan	15–6, 15–13	(gold) Winner
2005	All England Open	(Denmark) Jonas Rasmussen	(China) Cai Yun (China) Fu Haifeng	10–15, 6–15	(silver) Runner-up
2005	Thailand Open	(Denmark) Jonas Rasmussen	(South Korea) Jung Jae-sung (South Korea) Lee Jae-jin	11–15, 5–15	(silver) Runner-up
2005	Denmark Open	(Denmark) Jonas Rasmussen	(Malaysia) Chan Chong Ming (Malaysia) Koo Kien Keat	6–15, 7–15	(silver) Runner-up
2006	Singapore Open	(Denmark) Thomas Laybourn	(Indonesia) Sigit Budiarto (Indonesia) Flandy Limpele	8–21, 16–21	(silver) Runner-up
2006	Denmark Open	(Denmark) Jonas Rasmussen	(Denmark) Mathias Boe (Denmark) Joachim Fischer Nielsen	18–21, 21–10, 21–17	(gold) Winner
2007	Chinese Taipei Open	(Denmark) Jonas Rasmussen	(Indonesia) Markis Kido (Indonesia) Hendra Setiawan	17–21, 12–21	(silver) Runner-up

Mixed doubles
Year	Tournament	Partner	Opponent	Score	Result
1997	Dutch Open	(Denmark) Jane F. Bramsen	(Denmark) Jonas Rasmussen (Denmark) Ann-Lou Jorgensen	12–15, 6–15	(silver) Runner-up
1999	German Open	(Denmark) Jane F. Bramsen	(Denmark) Janek Roos (Denmark) Marlene Thomsen	15–10, 15–11	(gold) Winner
2005	Denmark Open	(Denmark) Helle Nielsen	(Denmark) Thomas Laybourn (Denmark) Kamilla Rytter Juhl	8–15, 9–15	(silver) Runner-up

BWF Grand Prix Gold tournament
BWF Grand Prix tournament

=== IBF International ===
Men's doubles
Year	Tournament	Partner	Opponent	Score	Result
1996	Slovak Open	(Denmark) Jesper Mikla	(Austria) Harald Koch (Austria) Jurgen Koch	11–15, 8–15	(silver) Runner-up
1997	Scottish Open	(Denmark) Jesper Mikla	(England) Steve Isaac (England) Neil Waterman	15–5, 15–7	(gold) Winner
1998	Norwegian International	(Denmark) Jesper Mikla	(Denmark) Michael Lamp (Denmark) Martin Lundgaard Hansen	15–9, 15–5	(gold) Winner

Mixed doubles
Year	Tournament	Partner	Opponent	Score	Result
1996	Slovak Open	(Denmark) Sarah Jonsson	(Slovenia) Andrej Pohar (Slovenia) Maja Pohar	15–8, 16–18, 7–15	(silver) Runner-up
1997	Scottish Open	(Denmark) Jane F. Bramsen	(Scotland) Russell Hogg (England) Tracy Hutchinson	15–6, 15–2	(gold) Winner
1998	Polish Open	(Denmark) Jane F. Bramsen	(Denmark) Jesper Mikla (Denmark) Ann-Lou Jorgensen	17–16, 4–15, 15–11	(gold) Winner
1998	Norwegian International	(Denmark) Jane F. Bramsen	(Sweden) Fredrik Bergström (Sweden) Jenny Karlsson	8–15, 15–10, 15–5	(gold) Winner

=== Invitation tournament ===
Men's doubles
Year	Tournament	Partner	Opponent	Score	Result
2003	Copenhagen Masters	(Denmark) Jonas Rasmussen	(Indonesia) Halim Haryanto (Indonesia) Candra Wijaya	11–15, 4–15	(silver) Runner-up
2008	Copenhagen Masters	(Denmark) Jonas Rasmussen	(Denmark) Mathias Boe (Denmark) Carsten Mogensen	14–21, 21–13, 21–19	(gold) Winner
2009	Copenhagen Masters	(Denmark) Jonas Rasmussen	(Denmark) Mathias Boe (Denmark) Carsten Mogensen	21–16, 22–20	(gold) Winner

Men's doubles
Year	Tournament	Partner	Opponent	Score	Result
2005	Copenhagen Masters	(Denmark) Mette Schjoldager	(England) Nathan Robertson (England) Gail Emms	12–15, 13–15	(silver) Runner-up
