= Dong-soo =

- Hangul: 동수
- RR: Dongsu
- MR: Tongsu

Dong-soo is a Korean given name.

People with this name include:

- Baek Dong-soo (1743–1816), Joseon Dynasty swordsman and martial artist
- Choi Dong-soo (baseball) (born 1971), South Korean baseball coach
- Choi Dong-soo (footballer) (born 1985), South Korean football player
- Kim Dong-soo (baseball) (born 1968), South Korean baseball manager
- Kim Dong-soo (canoeist) (born 1969), South Korean canoeist
- Kim Dong-soo (born 1981), South Korean former professional StarCraft player known as Garimto
- Lee Dong-soo (born 1974), South Korean badminton player
- Lee Dong-soo (footballer) (born 1994), South Korean football player

== See also ==
- List of Korean given names
