= Choi Dong-soo (baseball) =

South Korean baseball player and coach

LG Twins – No. 90
- First baseman
- Born: 11 September 1971 (age 54)
- Batted: Right Threw: Right

KBO debut
- 1994, for the LG Twins

Last KBO appearance
- 2013, for the LG Twins

KBO statistics
- Batting average: .268
- Home runs: 90
- Runs batted in: 502

Teams
- LG Twins (1994–2010); SK Wyverns (2010–2011); LG Twins (2012–2013)

Choi Dong-soo (Korean: 최동수; Hanja: 崔東秀; born 11 September 1971) is a South Korean former baseball player and coach.

== Pro Career ==
=== 2002 season ===
He got semi-playoff mvp and reached to Korean series runner-up.
