= Colin Haughton =

English badminton player

Personal information
- Born: 12 November 1972 (age 53) Manchester, England

Sport
- Country: England
- Sport: Badminton
- Handedness: Right

Men's singles
- Highest ranking: 19
- BWF profile

Colin Haughton (born 12 November 1972) is an English badminton singles player from Denton near Manchester who held the No. 1 position in the national rankings and reached as high as 19th in the world rankings.

Colin Haughton reached final of the English National Championships for five consecutive years, from 2000 to 2004. He won in 2000, 2001 and 2003, and did not contest the 2002 final, pulling out with injury, to give Mark Constable his only national title, with a walkover. Haughton lost the 2004 title to rising star Aamir Ghaffar, in front of his home crowd in Manchester, in a final. Shortly afterwards Haughton announced his retirement; supposedly suffering from a niggling hip injury, which had affected his performance in the final.

On Friday 2 February 2001, at the English Nationals in Burgess Hill, Colin achieved the dubious distinction of being the first English player to be 'yellow carded' by the umpire. His unfortunate offence was to have left his mobile telephone in his bag, courtside, switched on. The umpire was not amused when it rang during the game. At the time Colin said "I don't know who was ringing. I didn't realise I had left the phone in my bag."

Apart from his three National titles, his win over Singapore's Ronald Susilo in the Commonwealth Games helped England to a team Gold. He currently works as a coach.

== Achievements ==
- 1999: US Open
