= Garimto =

South Korean Starcraft player

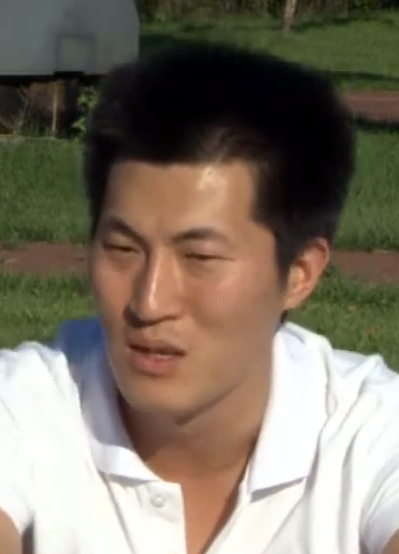
- Garimto in 2012

Personal information
- Name: Kim Dong-soo
- Born: 1 March 1981 (age 45)

Career information
- Games: StarCraft
- Role: Protoss

Team history
- ?–2003: Hanbit Stars
- 2007: KTF
- 2007: KTF MagicNs

Korean name
- Hangul: 김동수
- RR: Gim Dongsu
- MR: Kim Tongsu

Kim Dong-soo (Korean: 김동수, born 1 March 1981), or Garimto, is a South Korean former professional StarCraft player. He now commentates and is in charge of marketing in South Korea for the clothing brand Undefeated.

He is one of the only seven players to win the Ongamenet Starleague (OSL) twice. Garimto was nicknamed "The Zealot", and was notable for succeeding even during Boxer's height of dominance when many Protoss players struggled. He also innovated heavily with Protoss build-orders, making frequent use of "hidden" tech buildings and other tricks. Garimto had to quit professional StarCraft in order to do his Korean military service. He regularly acted as a commentator for games since. In his commentary he is known for criticizing current Protoss players for playing sloppily and hence not achieving the potential of the race. Garimto completed his military service in the Republic of Korea Army on 21 December 2006, and rejoined the e-sports competition as part of KTF, but retired from professional gaming after playing only one game, a loss to Free during the 2nd half of Shinhan Proleague 2007. He briefly returned to professional gaming in January 2007 after joining KTF MagicNs.

== Tournament results ==
- 1st — 2000 Freechall OnGameNet Starleague
- 1st — 2001 SKY OnGameNet Starleague

== See also ==
- StarCraft professional competition
