= 2000 Thomas & Uber Cup =

Biennial international badminton team championship

2000 Thomas & Uber Cup Piala Thomas dan Uber 2000

Tournament details
- Dates: 11–21 May 2000
- Edition: 21st (Thomas Cup); 18th (Uber Cup)
- Level: International
- Nations: 8 (Thomas Cup); 8 (Uber Cup)
- Venue: Putra Stadium
- Location: Kuala Lumpur, Malaysia
- Official website: bwfthomasubercups.com

The 2000 Thomas & Uber Cup was the 21st tournament of the Thomas Cup, and the 18th tournament of the Uber Cup, which are the major international team competitions in world badminton.

== Host city selection ==
Kuala Lumpur, Malaysia was the only city to submit a bid. International Badminton Federation accepted the bid during a meeting in Copenhagen. The Indoor Putra Stadium was chosen as the venue for the tournament.

== Qualification ==
Malaysia qualified automatically as hosts. Indonesia and China qualified for the Thomas Cup and the Uber Cup respectively as title holders.

=== Thomas Cup ===
Means of qualification	Date	Venue	Slot	Qualified teams
Host country	23 May 1998	Copenhagen	1	Malaysia
1998 Thomas Cup	17 – 24 May 1998	Hong Kong	1	Indonesia
European Zone	13 – 20 February 2000	Sofia	3	Denmark
European Zone	13 – 20 February 2000	Sofia	3	England
European Zone	13 – 20 February 2000	Sofia	3	Sweden
Asian Zone	13 – 20 February 2000	New Delhi	3	China
Asian Zone	13 – 20 February 2000	New Delhi	3	India
Asian Zone	13 – 20 February 2000	New Delhi	3	South Korea
Total			8	

=== Uber Cup ===
Means of qualification	Date	Venue	Slot	Qualified teams
Host country	23 May 1998	Copenhagen	1	Malaysia
1998 Uber Cup	17 – 24 May 1998	Hong Kong	1	China
European Zone	13 – 20 February 2000	Sofia	3	Denmark
European Zone	13 – 20 February 2000	Sofia	3	Netherlands
European Zone	13 – 20 February 2000	Sofia	3	Sweden
Asian Zone	13 – 20 February 2000	New Delhi	3	Indonesia
Asian Zone	13 – 20 February 2000	New Delhi	3	Japan
Asian Zone	13 – 20 February 2000	New Delhi	3	South Korea
Total			8	

== Medal summary ==
=== Medalists ===
Event	Gold	Silver	Bronze
Thomas Cup	Indonesia	China	Denmark
Thomas Cup	Indonesia	China	South Korea
Uber Cup	China	Denmark	Indonesia
Uber Cup	China	Denmark	South Korea

=== Medal table ===
* Host nation (Malaysia)

Rank	Nation	Gold	Silver	Bronze	Total
1	China	1	1	0	2
2	Indonesia	1	0	1	2
3	Denmark	0	1	1	2
4	South Korea	0	0	2	2
Totals (4 entries)		2	2	4	8

== Thomas Cup ==
=== Group stage ===
==== Group A ====
Pos	Team	Pld	W	L	GF	GA	GD	PF	PA	PD	Pts	Qualification
1	South Korea	3	3	0	21	12	+9	416	364	+52	3	Advance to semi-finals
2	Denmark	3	2	1	23	10	+13	446	323	+123	2	Advance to semi-finals
3	Malaysia	3	1	2	18	18	0	443	421	+22	1	
4	India	3	0	3	5	27	−22	263	460	−197	0	

Source: The Straits Times

12 May 2000
18:30 UTC+8

Malaysia	2–3	South Korea
Report

Putra Stadium, Kuala Lumpur

12 May 2000
18:30 UTC+8

Denmark	5–0	India
Report

Putra Stadium, Kuala Lumpur

14 May 2000
18:30 UTC+8

Denmark	2–3	South Korea
Report

Putra Stadium, Kuala Lumpur

14 May 2000
18:30 UTC+8

Malaysia	4–1	India
Report

Putra Stadium, Kuala Lumpur

16 May 2000
18:30 UTC+8

South Korea	4–1	India
Report

Putra Stadium, Kuala Lumpur

16 May 2000
18:30 UTC+8

Denmark	1–4	Malaysia
Report

Putra Stadium, Kuala Lumpur

==== Group B ====
Pos	Team	Pld	W	L	GF	GA	GD	PF	PA	PD	Pts	Qualification
1	Indonesia	3	3	0	28	3	+25	444	231	+213	3	Advance to semi-finals
2	China	3	2	1	22	10	+12	424	294	+130	2	Advance to semi-finals
3	England	3	1	2	10	22	−12	310	438	−128	1	
4	Sweden	3	0	3	3	28	−25	245	460	−215	0	

Source: The Straits Times

11 May 2000
18:30 UTC+8

Indonesia	5–0	Sweden
Report

Putra Stadium, Kuala Lumpur

11 May 2000
18:30 UTC+8

China	4–1	England
Report

Putra Stadium, Kuala Lumpur

13 May 2000
18:30 UTC+8

China	5–0	Sweden
Report

Putra Stadium, Kuala Lumpur

13 May 2000
18:30 UTC+8

Indonesia	5–0	England
Report

Putra Stadium, Kuala Lumpur

16 May 2000
18:30 UTC+8

Sweden	1–4	England
Report

Putra Stadium, Kuala Lumpur

16 May 2000
18:30 UTC+8

Indonesia	4–1	China
Report

Putra Stadium, Kuala Lumpur

=== Knockout stage ===
==== Bracket ====
Semi-finals
South Korea	1
China	3
Denmark	2
Indonesia	3

Final
China	0
Indonesia	3

==== Semi-finals ====
18 May 2000
18:30 UTC+8

China	3–1	South Korea
Report

Putra Stadium, Kuala Lumpur

19 May 2000
18:30 UTC+8

Indonesia	3–2	Denmark
Report

Putra Stadium, Kuala Lumpur

==== Final ====
21 May 2000
18:30 UTC+8

Indonesia	3–0	China
Report

Putra Stadium, Kuala Lumpur

2000 Thomas Cup winner

Indonesia
Twelfth title

== Uber Cup ==
=== Group stage ===
==== Group A ====
Pos	Team	Pld	W	L	GF	GA	GD	PF	PA	PD	Pts	Qualification
1	Denmark	3	3	0	24	10	+14	375	254	+121	3	Advance to semi-finals
2	Indonesia	3	2	1	20	14	+6	344	299	+45	2	Advance to semi-finals
3	Japan	3	1	2	15	17	−2	295	330	−35	1	
4	Malaysia	3	0	3	7	25	−18	240	371	−131	0	

Source: The Straits Times

11 May 2000
18:30 UTC+8

Indonesia	3–2	Japan
Report

Putra Stadium, Kuala Lumpur

11 May 2000
18:30 UTC+8

Denmark	4–1	Malaysia
Report

Putra Stadium, Kuala Lumpur

13 May 2000
18:30 UTC+8

Indonesia	1–4	Denmark
Report

Putra Stadium, Kuala Lumpur

13 May 2000
18:30 UTC+8

Japan	3–2	Malaysia
Report

Putra Stadium, Kuala Lumpur

15 May 2000
18:30 UTC+8

Denmark	3–2	Japan
Report

Putra Stadium, Kuala Lumpur

15 May 2000
18:30 UTC+8

Indonesia	5–0	Malaysia
Report

Putra Stadium, Kuala Lumpur

==== Group B ====
Pos	Team	Pld	W	L	GF	GA	GD	PF	PA	PD	Pts	Qualification
1	China	3	3	0	30	1	+29	385	94	+291	3	Advance to semi-finals
2	South Korea	3	2	1	20	12	+8	302	255	+47	2	Advance to semi-finals
3	Netherlands	3	1	2	9	25	−16	218	378	−160	1	
4	Sweden	3	0	3	6	27	−21	212	390	−178	0	

Source: The Straits Times

12 May 2000
18:30 UTC+8

China	5–0	Sweden
Report

Putra Stadium, Kuala Lumpur

12 May 2000
18:30 UTC+8

South Korea	4–1	Netherlands
Report

Putra Stadium, Kuala Lumpur

14 May 2000
18:30 UTC+8

China	5–0	Netherlands
Report

Putra Stadium, Kuala Lumpur

14 May 2000
18:30 UTC+8

South Korea	3–2	Sweden
Report

Putra Stadium, Kuala Lumpur

15 May 2000
18:30 UTC+8

China	5–0	South Korea
Report

Putra Stadium, Kuala Lumpur

15 May 2000
18:30 UTC+8

Netherlands	3–2	Sweden
Report

Putra Stadium, Kuala Lumpur

=== Knockout stage ===
==== Bracket ====
Semi-finals
Denmark	3
South Korea	0
Indonesia	0
China	3

Final
Denmark	0
China	3

==== Semi-finals ====
17 May 2000
18:30 UTC+8

South Korea	0–3	Denmark
Report

Putra Stadium, Kuala Lumpur

17 May 2000
18:30 UTC+8

China	3–0	Indonesia
Report

Putra Stadium, Kuala Lumpur

==== Final ====
20 May 2000
18:30 UTC+8

China	3–0	Denmark
Report

Putra Stadium, Kuala Lumpur

2000 Uber Cup winner

China
Seventh title
