= Messecenter Herning =

Exhibition centre in Herning, Denmark

MCH Messecenter Herning
- Interactive map of MCH Messecenter Herning
- Address: Vardevej 1, 7400; Herning, Denmark
- Coordinates: 56°07′19″N 8°56′34″E
- Owner: MCH Group
- Operator: MCH Group

Construction
- Built: 1954
- Opened: 20 May 1954; 72 years ago
- Expanded: 1963, 1971, 2003, 2010

Website
- www.mch.dk

The MCH Messecenter Herning is an exhibition centre and entertainment complex in Herning, Denmark. The complex is the largest fair and exhibition center in Denmark– beating the Bella Center in Copenhagen. Located on 130 acres (0.53 km^{2}), the complex hosts many events from trade shows, theatrical performances, sporting events, concert tours and other performances. It is one of the main attractions in Herning and draws a crowd of over 900,000 visitors per year.

== History ==
We must build a hall that is worthy of our city. Where all the companies in our country can get the opportunity to show, with exhibitions and fairs, what Danish enterprise can achieve. A hall where we can come together for art and sport and for all kinds of meetings.

— Kristian Madsen, Manager of Herning Motor Kompagni and the chairman of SIKH

The exhibition centre was conceptualized by Kristian Madsen, during his speech at the 1944 "Aktieselskabet Herning-Hallen". Originally designed a tourist attraction, the first hall was erected in May 1954 and was used for the Danish Textile Fair. Due to demand, the hall was expanded in 1963 and in 1964 opened with five additional halls. That same year, the venue played host to the Workman's & Industry Fair. With an additional expansion in 1971, the venue now consisted of exhibition halls and a conference center.

=== Vision 2025 ===
President of MCH Group, Georg Sørensen, presented a massive extension plan for the complex to meet further demand. It includes a highway expansion to the complex, a column-free exhibition hall, a stadium and an arena. Additionally, it will add a business park, movie theatre, drive-in movie theatre, cableway and horse racing grounds.

== Venues ==
=== MCH Herning Kongrescenter ===
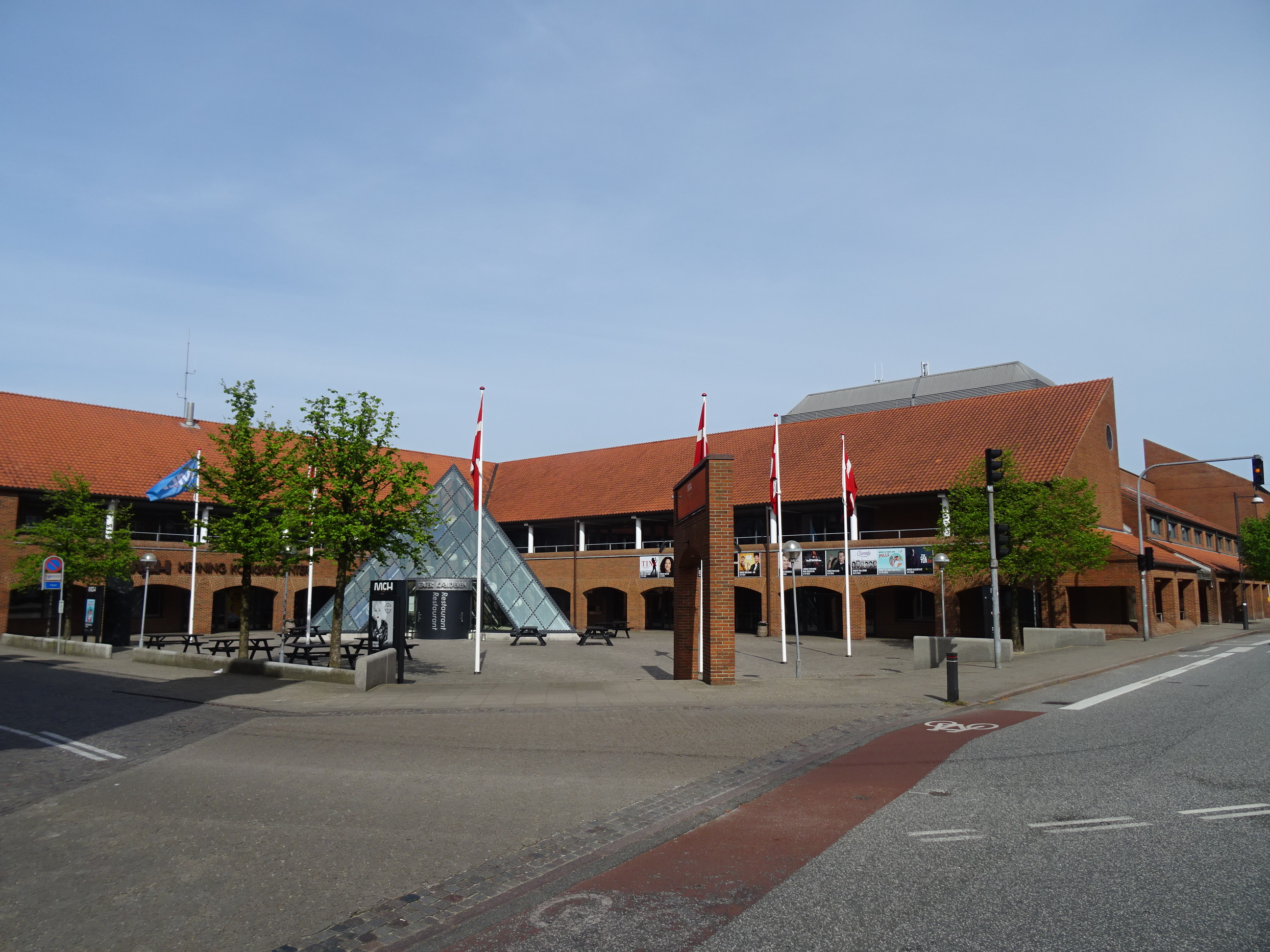
Kongrescenter in May 2024

The original hall for the complex and its most populated venue, the conference center hosts nearly 200 events per year. The center consists of an amphitheatre that can seat up to 1,100 guests. A concert hall mostly used for concerts, parties, exhibitions and congresses that can seat up to 2,400 guests. A congress hall that seats up to 1,800 guest and a cabaret hall for lectures and intimate concerts that seats up to 500 guests. There are four additional halls that are used for receptions and meetings. This venue also includes a restaurant, "Reater Kælderen", that features singing waiters and can seat up to 280 guests.

=== MCH Arena Herning ===
A part of the Vision 2025 expansion, the football stadium is home to the FC Midtjylland and can seat up to 11,800 spectators. The stadium began construction on 2 April 2003 and opened on 27 March 2004 as the MCH Stadion Herning. In August 2004, Scandinavian Airlines purchased the rights to the arena, changing its name to the SAS Arena. It became the first sponsored football stadium in Denmark's history. In 2009, the stadium's name was changed to MCH Arena Herning. The arena includes a restaurant, VIP lounge, sky boxes and a separate stand for fans.

=== Hall M ===
Another venture for the Vision 2025 plan, Hall M is Denmark's largest column-free exhibition hall. The hall was opened in 2004 and has hosted the Dansk Varmblods Gallashow, badminton tournaments and business receptions. The venue is also used a concert arena, having hosted Ozzy Osbourne, Bob Dylan and Beyoncé Knowles. The venue can host up to 9,100 guests.

=== CH Outdoor Arena ===
Added in 2009, the arena is a concert venue with a capacity of over 50,000 spectators. The arena was added in hopes of bringing music festivals to the area. It has hosted concerts by Genesis, Coldplay and Bruce Springsteen and the E Street Band.

=== Jyske Bank Boxen ===
Originally known as Hedens Colosseum, the indoor arena is deemed as Denmark's first indoor multi-arena. As one of the feature of the Vision 2025 plan, the arena began construction in October 2008 and opened by 10 October 2010. Lady Gaga was the inaugural act for the venue for her 2010 Monster Ball Tour. It also host concerts by Linkin Park, Elton John and Kylie Minogue. The arena was also used for the 2010 European Women's Handball Championship. On 1 October 2010, Danish bank, Jyske Bank purchased naming rights to the arena, changing its name from "MCH MultiArena" to "Jyske Bank Boxen".

== Venue seating capacities ==
Venue	Seating capacity
MCH Herning Kongrescenter	Amphitheatre: 1,100; The Concert Hall: 2,400; The Congress Hall: 1,800; The Cabaret Hall: 500
MCH Arena Herning	Seating: 7,300; Standing room: 4,500
Hall M	Concerts: 9,100; Sports: 8,000
MCH Outdoor Arena	Concert: ~50,000
Jyske Bank Boxen	Concert: 15,000; Sports: 12,500; Boxing: 13,488

== See also ==
- List of convention and exhibition centers
