= 1953 Irish Badminton Close =

1953 Irish Close Badminton Championships
Tournament details
- Dates: 18 December 1953– 19 December 1953
- Venue: Jacob's Recreation Hall, Bride Street; Sandymount Hall; St Andrew's Hall, Suffolk Street.
- Location: Dublin, Ireland

The 1953 Irish Close Badminton Championships was a national closed badminton tournament held in Dublin, Ireland from 18 to 19 December 1953. 80 matches were scheduled across three venues, namely Jacob's Recreation Hall, Bride Street; Sandymount Hall; and St Andrew's Hall, Suffolk Street.

== Final results ==
Category	Winners	Runners-up
Men's singles	J.P. Doyle	F.W. Peard
Women's singles	E. Abraham	S. Moore
Men's doubles	F.W. Peard; J.J. Fitzgibbon	J.P. Doyle; J.K.D. Lacey
Women's doubles	R. Gibson; Yvonne Kelly	A. Love; J. Duncan
Mixed doubles	J.J. Fitzgibbon; Barbara J. Good	D.B. Green; Mrs Potter

== Men's singles ==
The Men's singles results as reported in various newspapers:

First Round
B.J. Clear	15	15
N. Armstrong	6	6
R. Warner (Note: or R. Warren according to one newspaper; R. Warner in later rounds.)	w/o
J.J. Fitzgibbon	scr
A. McEachern	12	15	15
R. Collopy	15	11	3

Second Round
B.J. Clear	15	15
T.J. Gamble (Note: Two news reports give this as the second round tie, another states that it was R. Warner.)	6	6
R. Warner	Bye (Note: No second round fixture reported for Warner.)
G. Henderson	6	8
F.W. Peard	15	15
R. Henderson	14	6
C. McCormack	17	15
K. Diplock	15	15
J. Dillon	11	3
K. Carlisle	15	15
A. McEachern	4	2
D. Gilliland	15	18
P. Henderson	4	15
R. Smith	8	8
J.P. Doyle	15	15

Third Round
B.J. Clear	15	15
R. Warner	1	2
F.W. Peard	15	18
C. McCormack	8	17
K. Diplock	15	15
K. Carlisle	11	6
D. Gilliland	9	6
J.P. Doyle	15	15

Semifinals
B.J. Clear	11	8
F.W. Peard	15	15
K. Diplock	8	12
J.P. Doyle	15	15

Final
F.W. Peard	12	15	4
J.P. Doyle	15	9	15

== Women's singles ==
The Women's singles results as reported in various newspapers:

First Round
D. Kilbride	w/o
M. O'Sullivan	scr

Second Round
E. Abraham	11	11
I. Peard	2	5
D. Kilbride (Note: No second round fixture reported for Kilbride.)	Bye
S. Moore (Note: No second round fixture reported for Moore.)	Bye
Y. Kelly	11	11
G. O'Reilly	4	4

Semifinals
E. Abraham	11	11
D. Kilbride	5	6
S. Moore	11	11	12
Y. Kelly	6	12	11

Final
E. Abraham	11	11
S. Moore	6	8

== Men's doubles ==
The newspaper reports of the Men's doubles all agree that Peard and Fitzgibbon beat Doyle and Lacey in the final 15-7 and 15–4. However the results and fixtures from preceding rounds are unclear and at times conflicting. Below is an attempt to reconstruct the tournament fixtures:

First Round
C. McCormack; A.G. Trapnell	15	15
S. Cleary; G. Payne	10	11

Second Round
F.W. Peard; J.J. Fitzgibbon	15	15
D. Gilliland; K. Carlisle	11	13
G. Henderson; E.R. Henderson	15	10	15
B.K. Overend; B.J. Clear	5	15	12
R. Smyth; T.J. Gamble	15	18
J. Dillon; R. Pattison	3	14
K. Diplock; D.B. Green	6	15	15
C. McCormack; A.G. Trapnell	15	12	7
R. Henderson; J. Burtinshaw	15	15
D.R. Mayer; T. Bannon	6	10
S.S. Huey; R.S. Love	15	15
J. Hopkins; S. Andrews	1	6
A. McEachern; W. Hopkins	15	15
N. Armstrong; S. Styles	7	8
J.J. Lee; C.G. Orr	10	11
J.P. Doyle; J.K.D. Lacey	15	15

Third Round
F.W. Peard; J.J. Fitzgibbon	15	15
G. Henderson; E.R. Henderson	4	8
R. Smyth; T.J. Gamble
K. Diplock; D.B. Green
R. Henderson; J. Burtinshaw	4	8
S.S. Huey; R.S. Love	15	15
A. McEachern; A. Hopkins	4	8
J.P. Doyle; J.K.D. Lacey	15	15

Semifinals
F.W. Peard; J.J. Fitzgibbon
K. Diplock; D.B. Green
S.S. Huey; R.S. Love
J.P. Doyle; J.K.D. Lacey

Final
F.W. Peard; J.J. Fitzgibbon	15	15
J.P. Doyle; J.K.D. Lacey	7	4

== Women's doubles ==
The newspaper reports of the Women's doubles all agree that Gibson and Kelly beat Love and Duncan in the final 15–9, 12-15 and 15–9. However the results and fixtures from preceding rounds are unclear and at times conflicting. Below is an attempt to reconstruct the tournament fixtures:

First Round
S. Moore; E. Abraham	7	15	15
Mrs Nicholl; Mrs Billings	15	11	10
B. Good; N.M. Conway	15	15
J. Kilbride; I. Peard	7	2
A. Love; J. Duncan	17	17	15
Potter; Foster	14	18	11
D. Donaldson; J. Lawless	15	15
Mrs Blyth; G. Williamson	0	4
L. Henderson; E. Briggs	15	15
G. O'Reilly; A. Begley	6	9
Allen; R. Gibson	scr
M. O'Sullivan; Y. Kelly	w/o

Second Round
S. Moore; E. Abraham	15	10	18
B. Good; N.M. Conway	5	15	17
A. Love; J. Duncan (Note: No second round fixture is recorded for Love and Duncan.)
D. Donaldson; J. Lawless	15	15
L. Henderson; E. Briggs	8	4
R. Gibson; Y. Kelly (Note: Per Evening Herald report, Allen and O'Sullivan withdrew due to injury, and Gibson and Kelly progressed to final without playing any other matches)

Semifinals
S. Moore; E. Abraham	11	6
A. Love; J. Duncan	15	15
D. Donaldson; J. Lawless	scr
R. Gibson; Y. Kelly	w/o

Final
A. Love; J. Duncan	9	15	9
R. Gibson; Y. Kelly	15	12	15

== Mixed doubles ==
Below is an attempt to reconstruct the Mixed doubles tournament fixtures:

First Round
J.J. Fitzgibbon; B. Good	15	15
J.J. Lee; G. O'Reilly	8	9
A.G. Trapnell; N.M. Conway	4	15	15
B.K. Overend; Bellings	15	13	12
A. McEachern; I. Peard	18	9	15
J. Hopkins; J. Plews	13	15	12

Second Round
J.J. Fitzgibbon; B. Good	15	15
W. Hopkins; C. Draper	4	5
S.S.J. Huey; Foster	15	15
E.R. Henderson; E. Briggs	7	8
J.K.D. Lacey; J. Lawless (Note: No second round fixture is reported for this pair, possibly Peard and Donaldson the reigning champions, who were scratched due to injury)
T.J. Gamble; E. Abraham	w/o
G. Henderson; J. Allen	scr
D.B. Green; Mrs Potter	16	15	15
J.P. Doyle; D. Kilbride	18	6	13
Smyth; S. Moore	15	15
J. Burtinshaw; R. Gibson	10	12
R.S. Love; A. Love	15	15
A.G. Trapnell; N.M. Conway	6	0
Henderson; Henderson (Note: It is unclear from the reports which Henderson's these were.)	15	15
A. McEachern; I. Peard	6	5

Third Round
J.J. Fitzgibbon; B. Good	15	0	15
S.S.J. Huey; Foster	11	15	9
J.K.D. Lacey; J. Lawless	15	15
T.J. Gamble; E. Abraham	3	5
D.B. Green; Mrs Potter	15	15
R. Smyth; S. Moore	3	5
R.S. Love; A. Love	15	15
Henderson; Henderson	2	7

Semifinals
J.J. Fitzgibbon; B. Good	15	11	18
J.K.D. Lacey; J. Lawless	10	15	13
D.B. Green; Mrs Potter	15	7	15
R.S. Love; A. Love	10	15	10

Final
J.J. Fitzgibbon; B. Good	11	15	15
D.B. Green; Mrs Potter	15	10	9
