= 1951 Irish Badminton Close =

1951 Irish Close Badminton Championships
Tournament details
- Dates: 30 November 1951– 8 December 1951
- Venue: Garda Recreation Hall, The Depot, Phoenix Park
- Location: Dublin, Ireland

The 1951 Irish Close Badminton Championships was a national closed badminton tournament held in the Garda Recreation Hall, The Depot, Phoenix Park, Dublin, Ireland from 30 November to 8 December 1951.

== Final results ==
Category	Winners	Runners-up
Men's singles	F.W. Peard	J.P. Doyle
Women's singles	J. Lawless	D. Donaldson
Men's doubles	F.W. Peard; J.J. Fitzgibbon	J.P. Doyle; J.K.D. Lacey
Women's doubles	N. Conway; B. Good	J. Lawless; D. Donaldson
Mixed doubles	F.W. Peard; D. Donaldson	J.J. Fitzgibbon; B. Good

== Men's singles ==
Below is an attempt to reconstruct the men's singles tournament fixtures, as reported in various newspapers:

First Round
J.P. Doyle	15	15	-
B.J. Clear	11	6	-
N. McDowell	w/o	-	-
A. Frackleton	scr	-	-
J.J. Fitzgibbon	15	15	-
A. Clendenning	7	2	-
V.H. Booth	14	15	17
J.H. Cleary	17	11	15

Second Round
J.P. Doyle	15	15	-
N. McDowell	0	1	-
K. Diplock (Note: This may have been a first round match.)	15	15	-
J. Shaw	8	2	-
F.W. Peard	w/o	-	-
H.C. Boyd	scr	-	-
J.J. Fitzgibbon	15	15	-
V.H. Booth	6	6	-

Semifinals
J.P. Doyle	12	15	15
K. Diplock	15	7	5
F.W. Peard	15	13	15
J.J. Fitzgibbon	7	15	11

Finals
J.P. Doyle	15	13	8
F.W. Peard	12	15	15

== Women's singles ==
Below is an attempt to reconstruct the women's singles tournament fixtures, as reported in various newspapers:

First Round
J. Lawless	w/o	-	-
V. Gillespie	scr	-	-
Mrs C.K. Billings	11	11	-
D. Kilbride	6	8	-

Semifinals
A. Foster	12	1	4
J. Lawless	10	11	11
D. Donaldson	11	11	-
Mrs C.K. Billings (Note: Maiden name Dorothy Steele.)	7	1	-

Final
J. Lawless	11	11	-
D. Donaldson	8	9	-

== Men's doubles ==
Below is an attempt to reconstruct the men's doubles tournament fixtures, as reported in various newspapers:

First Round
K. Diplock; D.B. Green	15	15	-
V.H. Booth; J. Cleary	5	5	-
S.S.J. Huey; A. Clendenning	15	15	-
J. McDermott; G. Payne	9	2	-
A.G. Trapnell; J.S. Brewster	17	15	-
S.K. McComas; J.G. Briggs	14	11	-
C. McCormack; N. McDowell	w/o	-	-
A. Frackleton (Note: or Fradleton.) & Partner	scr	-	-

Second Round
J.P. Doyle; J.K.D. Lacey	15	15	-
A. Bedlow; V. Haslin	5	8	-
K. Diplock; D.B. Green	15	15	-
S.S.J. Huey; A. Clendenning	9	7	-
F.W. Peard; J.J. Fitzgibbon	15	15	-
R.G. Foxall; J.J. Lee	7	13	-
A.G. Trapnell; J.S. Brewster	15	15	-
C. McCormack; N. McDowell	5	6	-

Semifinals
J.P. Doyle; J.K.D. Lacey	15	14	18
K. Diplock; D.B. Green	7	17	15
F.W. Peard; J.J. Fitzgibbon	15	18	-
A.G. Trapnell; J.S. Brewster	4	15	-

Finals
J.P. Doyle; J.K.D. Lacey	5	1	-
F.W. Peard; J.J. Fitzgibbon	15	15	-

== Women's doubles ==
Below is an attempt to reconstruct the women's doubles tournament fixtures, as reported in various newspapers:

First Round
N. M. Conway; B. Good	15	17	-
Mrs Nichol; Mrs King	5	14	-
Mrs A.G. Trapnell; Mrs C.K. Billings	15	15	-
Miss Kelly; Mrs P.J. Byrne	6	5	-
D. Donaldson; J. Lawless	15	15	-
P. Atkinson; D. Kilbride	4	2	-
Mrs Potter; A. Foster	15	15	-
D. Byrne; N. Sheehan	6	5

Semifinals
N. M. Conway; B. Good	15	15	-
Mrs A.G. Trapnell (Note: Maiden name Eileen Carty.); Mrs C.K. Billings	9	7	-
D. Donaldson; J. Lawless	15	8	15
Mrs Potter; A. Foster	9	15	9

Final
N. M. Conway; B. Good	18	15	-
D. Donaldson; J. Lawless	16	6	-

== Mixed doubles ==
Below is an attempt to reconstruct the mixed doubles tournament fixtures, as reported in various newspapers:

First Round
J.J. Lee; Mrs C.K. Billings	15	15	-
S.K. McComas; Mrs McFerran	6	2	-
J.K.D. Lacey; N. Conway	15	9	15
J.P. Doyle; J. Lawless	12	15	11
D.B. Green; Mrs Potter	15	15
J. Shaw; Mrs Kelly	9	12	-

Second Round
J.J. Fitzgibbon; B. Good	18	15	-
N. McDowell; D. Kilbride	13	4	-
S.S.J. Huey; A. Foster	15	15	-
J. Cleary; Mrs P.J. Byrne	5	7	-
F.W. Peard; D. Donaldson	15	18	-
J.J. Lee; Mrs C.K. Billings	7	13	-
J.K.D. Lacey; N. Conway	15	15	-
D.B. Green; Mrs Potter	12	12	-

Semifinals
J.J. Fitzgibbon; B. Good	15	10	15
S.S.J. Huey; A. Foster	10	15	10
F.W. Peard; D. Donaldson	15	15	-
J.K.D. Lacey; N. Conway	7	6	-

Finals
J.J. Fitzgibbon; B. Good	15	7	7
F.W. Peard; D. Donaldson	7	15	15
