= 1949 Irish Badminton Close =

1949 Irish Close Badminton Championships
Tournament details
- Dates: 5 December 1949– 10 December 1949
- Venue: Woodbrook, Shankill
- Location: Dublin, Ireland

The 1949 Irish Close Badminton Championships was a national closed badminton tournament held in Woodbrook, Dublin, Ireland from 5 to 10 December 1949.

== Final results ==
Category	Winners	Runners-up
Men's singles	F.W. Peard	J.J. Fitzgibbon
Women's singles	B. Curran	B. Good
Men's doubles	F.W. Peard; J.J. Fitzgibbon	D.B. Green; T.T. Majury
Women's doubles	N. Conway; B. Good	V. Gillespie; Mrs A.G. Trapnell (Note: Maiden name Eileen Carty.)
Mixed doubles	F.W. Peard; D. Donaldson	J.J. Fitzgibbon; B. Good

== Men's singles ==
Below is an attempt to reconstruct the men's singles fixtures and results as reported in various newspapers:

First Round
K. Diplock	15	15	-
R.J. Anderson	6	7	-
C. Boyd	18	10	15
A. Clendenning	16	15	6
T.T. Majury	10	15	15
J.H. Cleary	15	6	10
R.G. Foxall	15	5	-
A.R. Gillespie	2	9	-

Second Round
J.J. Fitzgibbon (Note: This may have been a first round match.)	15	15	-
C. Orr	4	2	-
K. Diplock	15	17	-
C. Boyd	3	16	-
F.W. Peard	15	11	15
J.P. Doyle	7	15	3
T.T. Majury	18	15	-
R.G. Foxall	14	10	-

Semifinals
J.J. Fitzgibbon	12	15	15
K. Diplock	15	7	8
F.W. Peard	17	15	-
T.T. Majury	16	6	-

Finals
J.J. Fitzgibbon	11	4	-
F.W. Peard	15	15	-

== Women's singles ==
Below is an attempt to reconstruct the women's singles fixtures and results as reported in various newspapers:

First Round
A. Foster	11	5	11
W. Moore	6	11	3

Semifinals
B. Good	12	11	-
A. Foster	10	7	-
B. Curran	11	11	-
R.M. Cave	2	7	-

Final
B. Good (Retired)	11	3	-
B. Curran	0	7	-

== Men's doubles ==
Below is an attempt to reconstruct the men's doubles fixtures and results as reported in various newspapers:

First Round
C. Boyd; K. Diplock	15	15	-
A. Clendenning; C.H. Maidment	4	11	-

Second Round
T.T. Majury; D.B. Green	17	15	15
R.G. Foxall; J.J. Lee	18	8	7
J.P. Doyle; J.K.D. Lacey	15	17	-
S.K. McComas; J.S. Wilson	11	14	-
F.W. Peard; J.J. Fitzgibbon	15	15	-
J.H. Cleary; C.G. Orr	1	11	-
C. Boyd; K. Diplock	15	3	15
J.S. Brewster; A.G. Trapnell	7	15	7

Semifinals
T.T. Majury; D.B. Green	15	15	-
J.P. Doyle; J.K.D. Lacey	11	11	-
F.W. Peard; J.J. Fitzgibbon	18	15	-
C. Boyd; K. Diplock	13	10	-

Finals
T.T. Majury; D.B. Green	11	4	-
F.W. Peard; J.J. Fitzgibbon	15	15	-

== Women's doubles ==
Below is an attempt to reconstruct the women's doubles fixtures and results as reported in various newspapers:

First Round
V. Gillespie; Mrs A.G. Trapnell	15	12	17
M. Love; Mrs B. Potter	12	15	14
B. Cooper; Mrs M. Nichol	10	15	18
W. Moore; E. Robinson	15	7	16

Second Round
V. Gillespie; Mrs A.G. Trapnell	17	15	-
B. Curran; A. Foster	14	8	-
Mrs P.J. Byrne; D. Donaldson	15	15	-
R. Cave; M. Johnson	10	6	-
N. Conway; B. Good	15	15	-
Mrs C.K. Billings (Note: Maiden name Dorothy Steele.); C. Robinson	2	5	-
Mrs G. Kelly; C. Smith	18	15	-
B. Cooper; Mrs M. Nichol	2	5	-

Semifinals
V. Gillespie; Mrs A.G. Trapnell	15	15	-
Mrs P.J. Byrne; D. Donaldson	10	12	-
N. Conway; B. Good	15	15	-
Mrs G. Kelly; C. Smith	4	6	-

Finals
V. Gillespie; Mrs A.G. Trapnell	5	15	2
N. Conway; B. Good	15	13	15

== Mixed doubles ==
Below is an attempt to reconstruct the mixed doubles fixtures and results as reported in various newspapers:

First Round
J.P. Doyle; V. Gillespie	16	15	15
L. Green; N. Moore	17	6	9
K. Diplock; A. Foster	15	15	-
J.D. Hollwey; Mrs M. Nichol	11	5	-
F.W. Peard; D. Donaldson	15	15	-
S.K. McComas; Mrs McFarren	10	11	-

Second Round
J.J. Fitzgibbon; B. Good	15	15	-
C. Boyd; M. Love	8	4	-
J.P. Doyle; V. Gillespie	7	5	-
K. Diplock; A. Foster	15	15	-
F.W. Peard; D. Donaldson	15	15	-
J.J. Lee; Mrs C.K. Billings	3	6	-
D.B. Green; Mrs B. Potter	17	18	15
J.K.D. Lacey; N. Conway	15	16	9

Semifinals
J.J. Fitzgibbon; B. Good	15	15	-
K. Diplock; A. Foster	11	5	-
F.W. Peard; D. Donaldson	13	18	15
D.B. Green; Mrs B. Potter	15	15	13

Finals
J.J. Fitzgibbon; B. Good	16	13	-
F.W. Peard; D. Donaldson	18	18	-
