= 1950 Irish Badminton Close =

1950 Irish Close Badminton Championships
Tournament details
- Dates: 7 December 1950– 9 December 1950
- Venue: The Depot, Phoenix Park
- Location: Dublin, Ireland

The 1950 Irish Close Badminton Championships was a national closed badminton tournament held in the Garda Recreation Hall, The Depot, Phoenix Park, Dublin, Ireland from 7 to 9 December 1950.

== Final results ==
Category	Winners	Runners-up
Men's singles	F.W. Peard	J.J. Fitzgibbon
Women's singles	D. Donaldson	S. Moore
Men's doubles	F.W. Peard; J.J. Fitzgibbon	D.B. Green; T.T. Majury
Women's doubles	N. Conway; B. Good	V. Gillespie; D. Donaldson
Mixed doubles	F.W. Peard; D. Donaldson	J.J. Fitzgibbon; B. Good

== Men's singles ==
Below is an attempt to reconstruct the men's singles fixtures and results as reported in various newspapers:

First Round
J.P. Doyle	15	15	-
R.G. Foxall	10	6	-

Second Round
J.J. Fitzgibbon (Note: No fixture was reported for this player in this round.)
T.T. Majury	15	17	-
J.H. Cleary	4	14	-
F.W. Peard
K. Diplock	15	17	-
J.P. Doyle	10	14	-

Semifinals
J.J. Fitzgibbon	15	17	-
T.T. Majury	9	14	-
F.W. Peard	15	15	-
K. Diplock	7	7	-

Finals
J.J. Fitzgibbon	5	8	-
F.W. Peard	15	15	-

== Women's singles ==
Below is an attempt to reconstruct the women's singles fixtures and results as reported in various newspapers:

First Round
Mrs C.K. Billings (Note: Maiden name Dorothy Steele.)	11	12	-
W. Moore	4	11
S. Moore	11	11	-
Mrs A.G. Trapnell (Note: Maiden name Eileen Carty.)	2	8	-
D. Donaldson	11	11	-
J. Lawless	2	1	-
E. Abraham (Note: This fixture was scheduled but no result was reported. E. Abraham was reported in the next round.)	-	-	-
S. Moore	-	-	-

Semifinals
Mrs C.K. Billings	7	6	-
S. Moore	11	11	-
D. Donaldson	11	8	11
E. Abraham	7	11	1

Final
S. Moore	2	0	-
D. Donaldson	11	11	-

== Men's doubles ==
Below is an attempt to reconstruct the men's singles fixtures and results as reported in various newspapers:

First Round
T.T. Majury; D.B. Greene	15	15	-
J.J. Lee; R.G. Foxall	5	9	-
J.P. Doyle; K. Diplock	15	15	-
C.G. Orr; S.K. McComas	4	8	-
A.G. Trapnell (Note: No fixtures where reported for this pairing in this round.); J.K.D. Lacey	-	-	-
-	-	-
J. Shaw; M. O'Mahony	5	10	-
F.W. Peard; J.J. Fitzgibbon	15	15	-

Semifinals
T.T. Majury; D.B. Greene	15	14	15
J.P. Doyle; K. Diplock	6	18	8
A.G. Trapnell; J.K.D. Lacey	7	18	14
F.W. Peard; J.J. Fitzgibbon	15	14	17

Final
T.T. Majury; D.B. Greene	6	15	8
F.W. Peard; J.J. Fitzgibbon	15	12	15

== Women's doubles ==
Below is an attempt to reconstruct the women's doubles fixtures and results as reported in various newspapers:

First Round
B. Good; N. Conway	15	15	-
M. Johnson; Mrs McDermott	0	1	-
W. Moore (Note: This fixture was scheduled but no result was reported. Moore and Robinson were reported on in the next round.); C. Robinson	-	-	-
S. Moore; E. Abraham	-	-	-
D. Donaldson; V. Gillespie	15	15	-
Mrs M. Nichol; B. Cooper	3	12	-
Mrs Kelly; Mrs C.K. Billings	15	15	-
Mrs A.G. Trapnell; Mrs McFerran	10	0	-

Semifinals
B. Good; N. Conway	15	15	-
W. Moore; C. Robinson	1	5	-
D. Donaldson; V. Gillespie	15	15	-
Mrs G. Kelly; Mrs C.K. Billings	6	6	-

Final
B. Good; N. Conway	10	15	15
D. Donaldson; V. Gillespie	15	9	7

== Mixed doubles ==
Below is an attempt to reconstruct the mixed doubles fixtures and results as reported in various newspapers:

First Round
J.J. Fitzgibbon; B. Good	15	11	15
T.T. Majury; S. Moore	10	15	12
S.K. McComas; Mrs McFerran	18	15	-
J. Morton; Mrs C.K. Billings	17	10	-
A.G. Trapnell; Mrs A.G. Trapnell	15	15	-
R.G. Foxall; Mrs R.G. Foxall (Note: Maiden name Elizabeth Nuzum.)	1	5	-
V.H. Booth; Mrs M. Nichol	15	15	-
C.G. Orr; W. Moore	12	11	-
J.K.D. Lacey; J. Lawless	10	15	15
J.P. Doyle; V. Gillespie	15	10	7
K. Diplock; E. Abraham	15	12	15
J.H. Cleary; B. Cooper	9	15	3

Second Round
J.J. Fitzgibbon; B. Good	12	15	15
S.K. McComas; Mrs McFerran	15	0	8
D.B. Green; M. Johnson	15	17	-
A.G. Trapnell; Mrs A.G. Trapnell	11	14	-
F.W. Peard; D. Donaldson	15	15	-
V.H. Booth; Mrs M. Nichol	4	13	-
J.K.D. Lacey; J. Lawless	15	2	15
K. Diplock; E. Abraham	9	15	12

Semifinals
J.J. Fitzgibbon; B. Good	15	15	-
D.B. Green; M. Johnson	2	5	-
F.W. Peard; D. Donaldson	15	15	-
J.K.D. Lacey; J. Lawless	8	9	-

Finals
J.J. Fitzgibbon; B. Good	13	11	-
F.W. Peard; D. Donaldson	15	15	-
