= 1948 Irish Badminton Close =

1948 Irish Close Badminton Championships
Tournament details
- Dates: 6 December 1948– 11 December 1948
- Venue: Woodbrook, Shankill
- Location: Dublin, Ireland

The 1948 Irish Close Badminton Championships was a national closed badminton tournament held in Woodbrook, Dublin, Ireland from 6 to 10 December 1948.

== Final results ==
Category	Winners	Runners-up
Men's singles	J.J. Fitzgibbon	F.W. Peard
Women's singles	B. Good	R. Cave
Men's doubles	F.W. Peard; J.J. Fitzgibbon	K.L. Diplock; J. Webb
Women's doubles	N. Conway; B. Good	V. Gillespie; Mrs P. Byrne
Mixed doubles	J.J. Fitzgibbon; B. Good	K.L. Diplock; D. Donaldson

== Men's singles ==
Below is an attempt to reconstruct the men's singles fixtures and results as reported in various newspapers:

First Round
F.W. Peard	15	15
J.P. Doyle	11	10
R.G. Foxall	15	15
A.G. Trapnell	11	13

Semifinals
F.W. Peard	15	15
K.L. Diplock	12	11
J.J. Fitzgibbon	15	18
R.G. Foxall	1	16

Final
F.W. Peard	15	8	12
J.J. Fitzgibbon	10	15	15

== Women's singles ==
Below is an attempt to reconstruct the women's singles fixtures and results as reported in various newspapers:

Semifinals			Final
			B. Good	11	11
B. Donaldson (Note: Possibly D. Donaldson.)	0	9	R. Cave	2	4
R. Cave	11	12

== Men's doubles ==
Below is an attempt to reconstruct the men's doubles fixtures and results as reported in various newspapers:

First Round
J.S. Brewster; A.G. Trapnell	18	15
C.J. Lambert; S.K. McComas	14	10
F.W. Peard; J.J. Fitzgibbon	15	15
R.G. Foxall; J.J. Lee	8	9
G.C. Travers; J.S. Wilson	17	14	17
C.H. Maidment; L. Green	15	17	14

Semifinals
J.S. Brewster; A.G. Trapnell
K.L. Diplock (Note: No score was reported for this fixture, however Diplock and Webb progressed to the final.); J. Webb
F.W. Peard; J.J. Fitzgibbon	18	15
G.C. Travers; J.S. Wilson	16	10

Final
K.L. Diplock; J. Webb	10	7
F.W. Peard; J.J. Fitzgibbon	15	15

== Women's doubles ==
Below is an attempt to reconstruct the women's doubles fixtures and results as reported in various newspapers:

First Round
V. Hannin; L. Seery	15	15
E. Goulding; Mrs A.G. Trapnell (Note: Maiden name E. Carty.)	8	12
N. Conway; B. Good	15	15
B. Donaldson; E. Robinson	7	5
R. Cave; M. Johnson	15	11	15
Mrs C.E. Billings; C. Robinson	10	15	12

Semifinals
V. Hannin; L. Seery	4	4
Mrs P. Byrne; V. Gillespie	15	15
N. Conway; B. Good	15	15
R. Cave; M. Johnson	10	7

Final
Mrs P. Byrne; V. Gillespie	3	8
N. Conway; B. Good	15	15

== Mixed doubles ==
Below is an attempt to reconstruct the mixed doubles fixtures and results as reported in various newspapers:

First Round
J.J. Fitzgibbon; B. Good	15	18
J.H. Cleary; M. Johnson	7	17
C.H. Maidment; N. Conway	15	15
J.S. Wilson; C. Robinson	2	7
R.G. Foxall; V. Gillespie	15	11	10
J.S. Brewster; Mrs P. Byrne	8	15	15
K.L. Diplock; B. Donaldson	10	15	15
A.G. Trapnell; Mrs A.G. Trapnell	15	4	3

Semifinals
J.J. Fitzgibbon; B. Good	15	15
C.H. Maidment; N. Conway	8	6
J.S. Brewster; Mrs P. Byrne	8	15	11
K.L. Diplock; B. Donaldson	15	8	15

Final
J.J. Fitzgibbon; B. Good	9	15	18
K.L. Diplock; B. Donaldson	15	3	17
