= 1954 Irish Badminton Close =

1954 Irish Close Badminton Championships
Tournament details
- Dates: 2 December 1954– 4 December 1954
- Venue: Midland Branch Hall, Whitehall Road, Terenure
- Location: Dublin, Ireland

The 1954 Irish Close Badminton Championships was a national closed badminton tournament held in Midland Branch Hall, Whitehall Road, Terenure, Dublin, Ireland from 2 to 4 December 1954.

== Final results ==
| Category | Winners | Runners-up |
|---|---|---|
| Men's singles | J.P. Doyle | F.W. Peard |
| Women's singles | E. Abraham | M. O'Sullivan |
| Men's doubles | F.W. Peard; J.J. Fitzgibbon | J.P. Doyle; J.K.D. Lacey |
| Women's doubles | J. Lawless; D. Donaldson | N.N. Conway; B.J. Good |
| Mixed doubles | F.W. Peard; D. Donaldson | J.J. Fitzgibbon; B. J. Good |

== Men's singles ==
The results and fixtures from the first round are unclear and at times conflicting. The fixtures and results for the third round were not reported (alternatively there was no third round). Below is an attempt to reconstruct the tournament fixtures:

First Round
H.N. Rice | 15 | 15
J.Hopkins | 10 | 12
L. Gorman | 15 | 15 | 15
W. Armstrong (Note: other reports have Armstrong playing McCormack.) | 6 | 17 | 11
G. Henderson | 15 | 3 | 15
P. Sharkey (Note: other reports place P. Sharkey playing W.J. McMahon and progressing to second round.) | 8 | 15 | 5
F. Whyte* (Note: or White.) | 15 | 11 | 15
S. Poole | 6 | 15 | 5
W. Hopkins* | 15 | 15
N.C. Doyle | 5 | 10
D. Gilliland | 15 | 15
E. Henderson | 9 | 12
C. McCormack | 15 | 15
W. Armstrong (Note: other reports have Armstrong playing Gorman.) | 1 | 3
R.G. Travers* | 15 | 15
P. Gallagher | 12 | 8
P. Sharkey (Note: other reports place P. Sharkey losing to G. Henderson in the first round.) | 15 | 15
W. McMahon | 6 | 4
F.C. Lucas* | 15 | 15
P.S. Donegan | 5 | 6
D. Abbott* | 11 | 17 | 15
A. McEachern | 15 | 16 | 8
R. Smyth | 15 | 15
R. Henderson | 6 | 7

Second Round
F.W. Peard | 15 | 15
B.J. Clear | 9 | 7
H.N. Rice (Note: This fixture was scheduled for play but no result was reported.) [A]
L.Gorman [B]
J. Wallace | 15 | 15
G. Henderson | 12 | 13
F. Whyte [C] | 15 | 15
W. Hopkins | 10 | 3
D. Gilliland | 15 | 18
C. McCormack | 12 | 16
R.J. Travers (Note: or R.G. Travers.) | 5 | 7
P. Sharkey [D] | 15 | 15
F.C. Lucas [E] | 15 | 15
D. Abbott | 4 | 10
J.P. Doyle | 15 | 15
R. Smyth | 7 | 1

Third Round
F.W. Peard
[A] or [B] or [C] or [D] or [E]
J. Wallace
[A] or [B] or [C] or [D] or [E]
D. Gilliland
[A] or [B] or [C] or [D] or [E]
[A] or [B] or [C] or [D] or [E]
J.P. Doyle

Semifinals
F.W. Peard | 15 | 15
J. Wallace | 2 | 9
D. Gilliland | 8 | 11
J.P. Doyle | 15 | 15

Final
F.W. Peard | 6 | 15 | 8
J.P. Doyle | 15 | 10 | 15

*These may have been junior championship matches, not senior championship matches.

== Women's singles ==
The Women's singles results and fixtures from the first round may include junior championship matches - the reporting is not clear and the players often overlap. The fixtures and results for the second round (if any) were not reported. Below is an attempt to reconstruct the tournament fixtures:

First Round
I. Peard (Note: No further matches are reported for Peard.) | 11 | 11
G.W. Williamson | 4 | 4
G. O'Reilly | 11 | 11
A. Williamson | 8 | 2

Second Round
M. O'Sullivan (Note: This may have been a first round match.) | 11 | 11
G. O'Reilly | 4 | 4

Semifinals
E. Abraham | 6 | 11 | 11
Y. Kelly | 11 | 1 | 6
M. O'Sullivan | 11 | 11
S. Moore | 6 | 3

Final
E. Abraham (Note: Alternatively, the Sunday Independent gives a final score of 11-6 and 11-5 to Abraham.) | 11 | 8 | 11
M. O'Sullivan | 1 | 11 | 5

== Men's doubles ==
The newspaper reports of the Men's doubles all agree that Peard and Fitzgibbon beat Doyle and Lacey in the final 15-10 and 17–14. However the results and fixtures from preceding rounds are unclear and at times conflicting. Some of the second round results and the third round results were not reported. Below is an attempt to reconstruct the tournament fixtures:

First Round
R. Travers*; T. Bannon | 17 | 12 | 15
L. Andrews; J. Hopkins | 16 | 15 | 2
W.J. McMahon* (Note: or N.J. McMahon.); G. Redmond | 15 | 17 | 15
S. Poole; S. Cathcart | 10 | 18 | 4
J.J. Lee; B.J. Clear | 15 | 15
S.K. McComas; A. McEachern | 10 | 11
M. O'Mahony*; F. Gallagher | 15 | 15
N.A. Armstrong; R.A. Styles | 8 | 5
F. White*; J. Nixon | 15 | 15
F.C. Lucas; N. Coulter | 1 | 3
J.D. Hollway*; R. Anderson | 15 | 17
R. McCormack; G. Shaw | 11 | 15
B.K. Overend; C.G. Orr | 2 | 10
J.P. Doyle; J.K.D. Lacey | 15 | 15

Second Round
F.W. Peard; J.J. Fitzgibbon | 15 | '15
D. Green; R. Smyth | 7 | 4
R. Travers* [A] T. Bannon | 15 | 13 | 15
W.J. McMahon; G. Redmond | 5 | 18 | 10
E. Henderson; R. Henderson (Note: This fixture was scheduled but no result was reported.)
D. Gilliland; A.G. Trapnell
J.J. Lee (Note: No second round fixture recorded for this pair, but they were scheduled to play winner of Henderson & Henderson vs Gilliland & Trapnell); B.J. Clear
M. O'Mahony*; F. Gallagher | 16 | 4
D. Abbott [B] E.J. Ebbs | 18 | 15
S.S.J. Huey; J. Wallace
C. McCormack (Note: This fixture was scheduled but no result was reported.); G. Henderson
F. White* [C] J. Nixon | 15 | 15
J.D. Hollway; R. Anderson | 10 | 5
J.H. Cleary; J.J. Payne | 6 | 9
J.P. Doyle; J.K.D. Lacey | 15 | 15

Third Round
F.W. Peard; J.J. Fitzgibbon
[A] or [B] or [C]
E. Henderson (Note: No result reported for this fixture.); R. Henderson
J.J. Lee; B.J. Clear
[A] or [B] or [C]
C. McCormack; G. Henderson
[A] or [B] or [C]
J.P. Doyle; J.K.D. Lacey

Semifinals
F.W. Peard; J.J. Fitzgibbon | 15 | 15
E. Henderson; R. Henderson | 7 | 9
C. McCormack; G. Henderson | 4 | 8
J.P. Doyle; J.K.D. Lacey | 15 | 15

Final
F.W. Peard; J.J. Fitzgibbon | 15 | 17
J.P. Doyle; J.K.D. Lacey | 10 | 14

*These may have been junior championship matches, not senior championship matches.

== Women's doubles ==
Below is an attempt to reconstruct the Women's doubles tournament fixtures:

First Round
B. Good; N.M. Conway | 15 | 15
G. Williamson; A. Williamson | 4 | 1
I. Manley; P. McKettrick | 15 | 11 | 15
N. Wallace; Miss Orr | 8 | 15 | 11
I. Peard; D. Kilbride | 8 | 18 | 18
A. Foster; Mrs Potter | 15 | 17 | 16
J.M. Allen; L. Henderson | 5 | 15 | 15
M. O'Sullivan; Mrs Byrne | 15 | 12 | 8

Second Round
B. Good; N.M. Conway
I. Manley (Note: Fixture inferred from Manley & McKettrick winning first round. No result report.); P. McKettrick
E. Abraham; S. Moore | 8 | 15 | 18
I. Peard; D. Kilbride | 15 | 10 | 10
Y. Kelly; R. Gibson | 15 | 15
J.M. Allen; L. Henderson | 6 | 6
D. Donaldson; J. Lawless | 15 | 15
Mrs Nicholl; G. O'Reilly | 7 | 10

Semifinals
B. Good; N.M. Conway | 11 | 15 | 15
E. Abraham; S. Moore | 15 | 9 | 12
Y. Kelly; R. Gibson | 2 | 6
D. Donaldson; J. Lawless | 15 | 15

Final
B. Good; N.M. Conway | 11 | 2
D. Donaldson; J. Lawless | 15 | 15

== Mixed doubles ==
Below is an attempt to reconstruct the Mixed doubles tournament fixtures:

First Round
J.J. Fitzgibbon; B. Good | 15 | 15
S. McComas; J. Plews | 11 | 8
S.S. Huey [A] A. Foster | w/o | '
C.G. Orr; A.N. Other | scr
D.W. Gilliland [B] O'Sullivan | 15 | 9 | 15
G. Henderson; Parkhill | 6 | 15 | 8
R. Smyth [C] S. Moore | 15 | 6 | 15
J. Wallace; J.M. Allen | 10 | 15 | 11
D.B. Green; Mrs Potter | 15 | 15
R. Henderson; R. Gibson | 3 | 7
R. Anderson [D] D. Allen | 15 | 15
G. Shaw; J. Williamson | 2 | 5
P. Sharkey [E] Mrs Blyth | 15 | 15
S. Poole; Mrs Crampton | 4 | 11
F.W. Peard; D. Donaldson | 15 | 15
C. McCormack; Mrs Billings | 6 | 6
J.J. Lee; Y. Kelly | 15 | 15
A. McEachern; I. Peard | 4 | 9
J.K.D. Lacey; J. Lawless | 15 | 15
E.R. Henderson; L. Henderson | 8 | 11
J.H. Cleary; Mrs Nicholl | 15 | 15
L. Green; M. McComas | 3 | 9

Second Round
J.J. Fitzgibbon; B. Good
[A] or [B] or [C] or [D] or [E]
[A] or [B] or [C] or [D] or [E]
[A] or [B] or [C] or [D] or [E]
D.B. Green; Mrs Potter
[A] or [B] or [C] or [D] or [E]
[A] or [B] or [C] or [D] or [E]
[A] or [B] or [C] or [D] or [E]
F.W. Peard; D. Donaldson | 15 | 15
J.J. Lee; Y. Kelly | 8 | 3
[A] or [B] or [C] or [D] or [E]
[A] or [B] or [C] or [D] or [E]
J.K.D. Lacey; J. Lawless
[A] or [B] or [C] or [D] or [E]
J.P. Doyle [F] D. Kilbride | 15 | 15
J.H. Cleary (Note: or S. Cleary. Possible first round match.); Mrs Nicholl | 12 | 12

Third Round
J.J. Fitzgibbon; B. Good
[A] or [B] or [C] or [D] or [E] or [F]
D.B. Green; Mrs Potter
[A] or [B] or [C] or [D] or [E] or [F]
F.W. Peard; D. Donaldson
[A] or [B] or [C] or [D] or [E] or [F]
J.K.D. Lacey; J. Lawless
[A] or [B] or [C] or [D] or [E] or [F]

Semifinals
J.J. Fitzgibbon; B. Good | 15 | 15
D.B. Green; Mrs Potter | 9 | 12
F.W. Peard; D. Donaldson | 15 | 15
J.K.D. Lacey; J. Lawless | 9 | 12

Final
J.J. Fitzgibbon; B. Good | 4 | 18 | 11
F.W. Peard; D. Donaldson | 15 | 15 | 15
