= 1947 Irish Badminton Close =

1947 Irish Close Badminton Championships
Tournament details
- Dates: 8 December 1947– 13 December 1947
- Venue: Woodbrook, Shankill
- Location: Dublin, Ireland

The 1947 Irish Close Badminton Championships was a national closed badminton tournament held in Woodbrook, Dublin, Ireland from 8 to 13 December 1947. It was the first post war national badminton competition in Ireland.

== Final results ==
Category	Winners	Runners-up
Men's singles	D.B. Green	R.S. Bell
Women's singles	B. Good	R. Cave
Men's doubles	D.B Green; T.T. Majury	J.S. Brewster; A.G. Trapnell
Women's doubles	N. Conway; B. Good	Mrs A.G. Trapnell (Note: Maiden name E. Carty); Mrs P.J. Byrne
Mixed doubles	D.B. Green; V. Gillespie	C.H. Maidment; N. Conway

== Men's singles ==
The men's singles results as reported in various newspapers:

First Round
D.B. Green	15	8	15
A.G. Trapnell	5	15	10
J.J. Fitzgibbon	2	15	15
T.T. Majury	15	9	12

Semifinals
D.B. Green	15	17
F.W. Peard	1	14
R.S. Bell	12	4
J.J. Fitzgibbon (retired)	15	1

Final
D.B. Green	15	15
R.S. Bell	7	10

== Women's singles ==
The women's singles results as reported in various newspapers:

Semifinals	Finals
	B. Good	3	11	11
	R. Cave	11	4	0

== Men's doubles ==
The men's doubles results as reported in various newspapers:

First Round
J.J. Fitzgibbon; F.W. Peard	15	15
J.G. Briggs; J.S. Wilson	9	4
J.S. Brewster; A.G. Trapnell	15	15
R.G. Foxall; J.J. Lee	5	9

Semifinals
J.J. Fitzgibbon; F.W. Peard	scr
J.S. Brewster; A.G. Trapnell	w/o
D.B. Green; T.T. Majury	15	15
C.H. Maidment; J.H. Cleary	4	9

Final
J.S. Brewster; A.G. Trapnell	3	15
D.B. Green; T.T. Majury	15	18

== Women's doubles ==
The women's doubles results as reported in various newspapers:

Semifinals			Finals
Mrs P.J. Byrne; Mrs A.G. Trapnell	15	15
V.H. Gillespie; C. Robinson	11	9	Mrs P.J. Byrne; Mrs A.G. Trapnell	6	10
N. Conway; B. Good	15	15	N. Conway; B. Good	15	15
G. Kelly; C. Smith	8	0

== Mixed doubles ==
The mixed doubles results as reported in various newspapers:

First Round
J.J. Fitzgibbon; B. Good	15	15
J.S. Brewster; Mrs P.J. Byrne	10	11
F.W. Peard; M.T. Jackson	18	13	8
D.B. Green; V.H. Gillespie	15	15	15
A.G. Trapnell; Mrs A.G. Trapnell	15	15
R.S. Bell; G. Kelly	5	9

Semifinals
J.J. Fitzgibbon; B. Good	scr
D.B. Green; V.H. Gillespie	w/o
C.H. Maidment; N. Conway	15	15
A.G. Trapnell; Mrs A.G. Trapnell	6	5

Final
D.B. Green; V.H. Gillespie	15	15
C.H. Maidment; N. Conway	8	7
