= 1956 Irish Badminton Close =

1956 Irish Close Badminton Championships
Tournament details
- Dates: 12 December 1956– 15 December 1956
- Venue: Midland Branch Hall, Whitehall Road, Terenure
- Location: Dublin, Ireland

The 1956 Irish Close Badminton Championships was a national closed badminton tournament held in Midland Branch Hall, Whitehall Road, Terenure, Dublin, Ireland from 12 to 15 December 1956.

== Final results ==
Category	Winners	Runners-up
Men's singles	J.P. Doyle	F.W. Peard
Women's singles	Y. Kelly	M. O'Sullivan
Men's doubles	K. Carlisle; S. Love	J.P. Doyle; J.K.D. Lacey
Women's doubles	Y. Kelly; M. O'Sullivan	J. Lawless; D. Donaldson
Mixed doubles	K. Carlisle; J. Duncan	J.J. Fitzgibbon; B. Good

== Men's singles ==
Below is the men's singles tournament fixtures, as reported in various newspapers:

First Round
J.P. Doyle	15	15
J. Wallace	4	6
A. McEachern	15	15
J.L. Gorman	9	5
G. Henderson	11	15	15
D. Gilliland	15	4	9
R. Harmon	15	15
T. Cinnamond	11	11
F.W. Peard	15	15
K. Carlisle	0	9
J. Bertenshaw	1	17	15
W. Armstrong	15	14	8
C. McCormack	w/o
R. Smyth	scr
R. Harris	15	15
R. Johnstone	6	0

Quarterfinals
J.P. Doyle	w/o
A. McEachern	scr
G. Henderson	15	15
R. Harmon	11	6
F.W. Peard	15	15
J. Bertenshaw	2	10
C. McCormack	15	15
R. Harris	5	7

Semifinals
J.P. Doyle	15	15
G. Henderson	11	6
F.W. Peard	15	18
C. McCormack	6	15

Finals
J.P. Doyle	15	17
F.W. Peard	0	14

== Women's singles ==
Below is the women's singles tournament fixtures, as reported in various newspapers:

Semifinals
M. O'Sullivan	11	11
L. Rea	8	4
Y. Kelly	11	5	11
Mrs Kelly	1	11	5

Finals
M. O'Sullivan	11	8	9
Y. Kelly	5	11	12

== Men's doubles ==
Below is an attempt to reconstruct the men's doubles fixtures based on reporting in various newspapers:

First Round
J.P. Doyle; J.K.D. Lacey (Note: No first round fixture or result is reported for this pair.)
J. Bertenshaw [A] K. Robinson (Note: No further fixtures or results are reported for this pair.)	15	15
N. Douglas; M. Farrell	9	9
C. McCormack; G. Henderson	15	15
F.W. Peard; R. Harmon	13	4
D. Gilliland [B] J. Wallace	15	16	15
J.J. Lee; A.G. Trapnell	4	17	4
K. Carlisle; S. Love
S. Payne [C] E. Cinnamond	15	15
S. Eakin; R. Johnson	8	10
J.J. Fitzgibbon; R. Harris	15	15
S.K. McComas; W. Hopkins	2	6
C. Harrison [D] L. Gorman	17	15	15
N. Armstrong; A. McEachern	18	8	10

Quarterfinals
J.P. Doyle; J.K.D. Lacey (Note: No second round fixture or result is reported for this pair.)
[A] or [B] or [C] or [D]
C. McCormack; G. Henderson
[A] or [B] or [C] or [D]
K. Carlisle; S. Love
[A] or [B] or [C] or [D]
J.J. Fitzgibbon; R. Harris
[A] or [B] or [C] or [D]

Semifinals
J.P. Doyle; J.K.D. Lacey	15	15
C. McCormack; G. Henderson	5	7
K. Carlisle; S. Love	15	15
J.J. Fitzgibbon; R. Harris	10	2

Finals
J.P. Doyle; J.K.D. Lacey	16	12
K. Carlisle; S. Love	17	15

== Women's doubles ==
Below is the women's doubles tournament fixtures, as reported in various newspapers:

First round
Y. Kelly; M. O'Sullivan	w/o
J.M. Allen; A. Love (Note: It would appear that A. Love partnered with another player to fulfill the fixtures.)	scr

Semifinals
B. Donaldson; J. Lawless	15	15
Mrs Gilliland; B. Good	6	12
Y. Kelly; M. O'Sullivan	15	15
J. Duncan; A. Love	6	11

Finals
B. Donaldson; J. Lawless	4	4
Y. Kelly; M. O'Sullivan	15	15

== Mixed doubles ==
Below is an attempt to reconstruct the mixed doubles fixtures based on reporting in various newspapers:

First Round
J.J. Fitzgibbon; B. Good	15	15
B. Harrison; Pattison	8	9
R. Johnston; Downey	w/o
R. Smyth; S. Smyth	scr
J.P. Doyle; M. O'Sullivan	w/o
J. Wallace; J.M. Allen	scr
J.K.D. Lacey [A] J. Lawless	15	15
G. Henderson; L. Rea	9	9
K. Carlisle; J. Duncan	15	15
N. Armstrong; G. Williamson	0	3
D. Gilliland [B] Mrs Gilliland	11	15	15
G. Payne; D. Donaldson	15	10	9
S. Love; A. Love	w/o
S.K. McComas; Plews	scr
F. Cinnamond [C] Mrs McDermott (Note: This was reported as a second round match, but based on the other pairings and results appears to be a first round match. No further fixtures or results were reported for this pairing.)	15	15
F. Snow; Cathcart	14	0

Second Round
J.J. Fitzgibbon; B. Good	15	15
R. Johnston; Downey	5	9
J.P. Doyle; M. O'Sullivan
[A] or [B] or [C]
K. Carlisle; J. Duncan
[A] or [B] or [C]
S. Love; A. Love
[A] or [B] or [C]

Semifinals
J.J. Fitzgibbon; B. Good	15	15
J.P. Doyle; M. O'Sullivan	9	8
K. Carlisle; J. Duncan	11	15	15
S. Love; A. Love	15	10	8

Finals
J.J. Fitzgibbon; B. Good	8	15	17
K. Carlisle; J. Duncan	15	10	18
