= 1952 Irish Badminton Close =

1952 Irish Close Badminton Championships
Tournament details
- Dates: 4 December 1952– 6 December 1952
- Venue: The Depot, Phoenix Park
- Location: Dublin, Ireland

The 1952 Irish Close Badminton Championships was a national closed badminton tournament held in the Depot, Phoenix Park, Dublin, Ireland from 4 to 6 December 1952.

== Final results ==
Category	Winners	Runners-up
Men's singles	F.W. Peard	J.J. Fitzgibbon
Women's singles	S. Moore	E. Abraham
Men's doubles	F.W. Peard; J.J. Fitzgibbon	M. Robinson; R. Smith
Women's doubles	J. Lawless; D. Donaldson	N. Conway; B. Good
Mixed doubles	F.W. Peard; D. Donaldson	J.J. Fitzgibbon; B. Good

== Men's singles ==
Below is an attempt to reconstruct the men's singles tournament fixtures, as reported in various newspapers:

First Round
J.J. Fitzgibbon (Note: No result was reported for this fixture.)
A. McEachern
J. Dillon [A] (Note: No second round fixture was reported for this player.)	18	15
W. Walsh	13	8
M. Robinson	15	15
R. Smith	5	2
J. Shaw	w/o
J. Black	scr
F.W. Peard	15	15
R. Bell	10	5
J. McMahon [B]	12	15	15
P. Dixon	15	7	4
B.J. Clear	15	15
N. McDowell	4	3
D. Abbott [C]	15	17
T. Collopy	5	14

Quarterfinals
J.J. Fitzgibbon (Note: No fixture is recorded for this player in this round.)
[A] or [B] or [C]
M. Robinson	15	15
J. Shaw	10	8
F.W. Peard
[A] or [B] or [C]
B.J. Clear
[A] or [B] or [C]

Semifinals
J.J. Fitzgibbon	15	11	15
M. Robinson	9	15	13
F.W. Peard	15	18
B.J. Clear	12	14

Finals
J.J. Fitzgibbon	15	9	10
F.W. Peard	13	15	15

== Women's singles ==
The women's singles results as reported in various newspapers:

First Round
D. Donaldson	10	11	11
Y. Kelly	12	8	3

Second Round
E. Abraham	10	11	11
I. Peard	12	7	4
J. Lawless	11	11
D. Kilbride	5	6
S. Moore	11	11
M. O'Sullivan	8	0
D. Donaldson	11	11
B. Curran	5	4

Semifinals
E. Abraham	11	11
J. Lawless	4	7
S. Moore	11	11
D. Donaldson	2	7

Final
E. Abraham	5	8
S. Moore	11	11

== Men's doubles ==
Below is an attempt to reconstruct the tournament fixtures:

First Round
B.J. Clear [A] B.K. Overend (Note: This fixture was scheduled, but no result was reported and no further fixtures were found for this pair.)
S.K. McComas [B] A.G. Trapnell
T.Collopy [C] P.Dixon
R.C. Foxall [D] J.J. Lee
J. Dillon [E] M. Whelan
C. McCormack [F] A. McEachern
D. Abbott [G] C. Allen (Note: There were two C. Allen's reported with different partners.) (Note: No further fixtures were reported for this pair.)	15	15
W.J. McMahon; R. Redmond	4	7
J.D. Hollwey [H] W. McDowell	15	15
R. King; A.J. Wildgust	13	11
F.W. Peard; J.J. Fitzgibbon	15	15
C. Allen; J. Shaw	11	11

Second Round
M. Robinson; R. Smith (Note: No fixture or result is reported for this pair in this round.)
[A] or [B] or [C] or [D] or [F] or [G] or [H]
[A] or [B] or [C] or [D] or [F] or [G] or [H]
[A] or [B] or [C] or [D] or [F] or [G] or [H]
[A] or [B] or [C] or [D] or [F] or [G] or [H]
[A] or [B] or [C] or [D] or [F] or [G] or [H]
F.W. Peard; J.J. Fitzgibbon
[A] or [B] or [C] or [D] or [F] or [G] or [H]

Semifinals
M. Robinson; R. Smith
[A] or [B] or [C] or [D] or [F] or [G] or [H]
F.W. Peard; J.J. Fitzgibbon
[A] or [B] or [C] or [D] or [F] or [G] or [H]

Final
M. Robinson; R. Smith	11	6
F.W. Peard; J.J. Fitzgibbon	15	15

== Women's doubles ==
Below is an attempt to reconstruct the tournament fixtures:

First Round (Note: Two other fixtures were reported: Atkinson (or McDermott) & Moore beat Timmons and Rothwell 15-10, 15-5; Blythe & Campbell walkover v Murphy & partner scratched. It is not clear how these fit in the fixtures, and they may be junior championship games.)
D. Kilbride; I. Peard	15	15
Plews; Varian	10	7
Y. Kelly (Note: This fixture was scheduled but no result was reported. Kelly and O'Sullivan progressed to the next round.); M. O'Sullivan
Orr; Sheehan

Second Round
D. Donaldson; J. Lawless (Note: No fixture or result was reported for this pair in this round, but it was noted that they would play the winner of Moore & Abraham vs Nichol & King.)
S. Moore; E. Abraham (Note: This may have been a first round match.)	15	15	15
Nichol; King	8	18	7
N. Conway; B. Good	15	15
D. Kilbride; I. Peard	4	11
Billings; B. Curran	7	15	15
Y. Kelly; M. O'Sullivan	15	12	8

Semifinals
D. Donaldson; J. Lawless (Note: This fixture was scheduled but no result was reported. Donaldson and Lawless progressed to the final.)
S. Moore; E. Abraham
N. Conway; B. Good (Note: This fixture was scheduled but no result was reported. Conway and Good progressed to the final.)
Billings; B. Curran

Final
D. Donaldson; J. Lawless	8	15	15
N. Conway; B. Good	15	12	5

== Mixed doubles ==
Below is an attempt to reconstruct the mixed doubles tournament fixtures:

First Round
B.K. Overend; D. Kilbride	15	12	15
C. McCormack; Y. Kelly (Note: This pair appear twice in the reports playing different opponents and losing to both.)	12	15	11
A.G. Trapnell; N. Conway	15	8	15
Lee; Billings	8	15	7
R. Redmond; Campbell	w/o
J. Byrne; McLaughlin	scr
D. Coughlan; Morton	15	15
P. Dixon; M. O'Sullivan	11	7
R. Smith; Moore
McConnell; Robinson
D. Abbot; Orr	16	15	17
N. McDowell; Atkinson	17	8	15
J. McDermott [F] (Note: This fixture was scheduled, but it is unclear which pair won, as subsequent fixtures mention both pairs.); McDermott
Whelan; Begley
D. Meyer [G] Meyer	w/o
P. Travers; Sheehan	scr
J.D. Hollwey [H] D. Kilbride (Note: Kilbride was listed as playing with Overend. No further fixtures or results are reported for this pair.)	15	15
R. McIlroy; Plews	2	8
F.W. Peard; D. Donaldson	15	15
B.J. Clear; J. Lawless	8	6
C. Allen; Nichol	15	15
T. Collopy; I.Peard	7	0

Second Round
J.J.Fitzgibbon; B. Good
B.K. Overend; D. Kilbride	9	15	4
A.G. Trapnell [A] N. Conway	15	5	15
R. Redmond; Campbell	15	4	15
C. McCormack; Y. Kelly	12	15	11
D. Allen; Moore	15	15
J. Dillon; Whelan	12	4
D. Coughlan; Morton	4	4
R. Smith [D] Moore	15	15
D. Abbot [E] Orr
[F] or [G] (Note: The reports are conflicting, Abbot and Orr were scheduled to paly either.)
[F] or [G]
[H]
F.W. Peard; D. Donaldson
C. Allen; Nichol

Quarterfinals
J.J. Fitgibbon; B. Good
[A] or [D] or [E] or [F] or [G] or [H]
R. Redmond [B] Campbell
D. Allen [C] Moore
[A] or [D] or [E] or [F] or [G] or [H]
[A] or [D] or [E] or [F] or [G] or [H]
[A] or [D] or [E] or [F] or [G] or [H]
F.W. Peard; D. Donaldson

Semifinals
J.J. Fitgibbon; B. Good
[A] or [B] or [C] or [D] or [E] or[F] or [G] or [H]
[A] or [B] or [C] or [D] or [E] or[F] or [G] or [H]
F.W. Peard; D. Donaldson

Finals
J.J. Fitgibbon; B. Good	18	8	10
F.W. Peard; D. Donaldson	17	15	15
