= 1955 Irish Badminton Close =

1955 Irish Close Badminton Championships
Tournament details
- Dates: 7 December 1955– 10 December 1955
- Venue: Midland Branch Hall, Whitehall Road, Terenure
- Location: Dublin, Ireland

The 1955 Irish Close Badminton Championships was a national closed badminton tournament held in Midland Branch Hall, Whitehall Road, Terenure, Dublin, Ireland from 7 to 10 December 1955.

== Final results ==
Category	Winners	Runners-up
Men's singles	J.P. Doyle	C. McCormack
Women's singles	Y. Kelly	E. Mercer (née Abraham)
Men's doubles	J.P. Doyle; J.K.D. Lacey	K. Carlisle; P. Sharkey
Women's doubles	J. Lawless; D. Donaldson	Y. Kelly; M. O'Sullivan
Mixed doubles	J.K.D. Lacey; J. Lawless	J.P. Doyle; D. Kilbride

== Men's singles ==
Below is an attempt to reconstruct the tournament fixtures:

First Round
K. Carlisle	18	9	15
P. Sharkey	13	15	11
A. McEachern	15	15
R. Smyth	10	10
C. McCormack	w/o
G. Foxall	scr
A.J. Wildgust	15	15
N.H. Armstrong	10	11

Second Round
J.P. Doyle (Note: This may have been a first round match.)	15	15
G. Bertenshaw	5	4
K. Carlisle (Note: This fixture was scheduled but no result was reported.)
A. McEachern
C. McCormack
A.J. Wildgust
G. Henderson	1	15	15
B.J. Clear	15	12	6

Semifinals
J.P. Doyle	11	15	15
K. Carlisle	15	4	7
C. McCormack	15	15
G. Henderson	8	11

Final
J.P. Doyle	13	15	15
C. McCormack	15	1	1

== Women's singles ==
Below is an attempt to reconstruct the tournament fixtures:

First Round
Y. Kelly	11	12
S. Smyth	8	9

Semifinals
E. Mercer (née Abraham)	11	11
F. Shaw	4	4
M. O'Sullivan	10	6
Y. Kelly	12	11

Final
E. Mercer (née Abraham)	5	5
Y. Kelly	11	11

== Men's doubles ==
Below is an attempt to reconstruct the tournament fixtures:

First Round
R. Smyth; G. Bertenshaw	15	16	15
A.G. Trapnell; A. McEachern	5	17	16

Second Round
J.P. Doyle; J.K.D. Lacey	15	15
W. Armstrong; G. Redmond	7	5
R. Smyth; G. Bertenshaw
Orr; Bell
K. Carlisle; P. Sharkey	15	4	15
C. McCormack; G. Henderson	12	15	10
G. Payne; T. Cinnamond	10	15	15
S.K. McComas; F.W. Peard	15	8	11

Semifinals
J.P. Doyle; J.K.D. Lacey	15	15
R. Smyth; G. Bertenshaw (Note: or J. Bertenshaw.)	7	10
K. Carlisle; P. Sharkey	15	18
G. Payne; T. Cinnamond	10	16

Final
J.P. Doyle; J.K.D. Lacey	15	15
K. Carlisle; P. Sharkey	6	7

== Women's doubles ==
Below are the women's double fixtures as reported in various newspapers:

First Round
Y. Kelly; M. O'Sullivan	w/o
G. Williamson & Partner	scr
J.M. Allen; King	6	9
E. Mercer (née Abraham); S. Smyth	15	15
B. Donaldson; J. Lawless	15	15
Mrs Shaw; Briggs	9	6
I. Peard; D. Kilbride	15	15
W. Moore; Mrs Nicholl	9	7

Semifinals
Y. Kelly; M. O'Sullivan	15	15
E. Mercer (née Abraham); S. Smyth	8	9
B. Donaldson; J. Lawless	8	15	15
I. Peard; D. Kilbride	15	1	8

Final
Y. Kelly; M. O'Sullivan	9	15	3
B. Donaldson; J. Lawless	15	12	15

== Mixed doubles ==
Below is an attempt to reconstruct the mixed doubles tournament fixtures:

First Round
A. McEachern [A] I. Peard	15	15
B.J. Clear; F. Shaw	10	10
K. Carlisle; M. O'Sullivan	15	15
G. Payne; D. Donaldson	6	10
F. White [B] Mrs Nicholl	10	15	15
W. Armstrong; G. Williamson	15	12	6
C. McCormack [C] Y. Kelly	15	15
C.G. Orr; B. Good	5	3
R. Smyth; S. Smyth	15	15
A.J. Wildgust; Meares	4	7

Second Round
J.K.D. Lacey (Note: No first or second round fixture is reported for this pair.); J. Lawless
[A] or [B] or [C]
K. Carlisle (Note: No second round fixture reported for this pair.); M. O'Sullivan
[A] or [B] or [C]
J.P. Doyle; D. Kilbride
[A] or [B] or [C]
R. Smyth; S. Smyth
G. Henderson; J.M. Allen

Semifinals
J.K.D. Lacey; J. Lawless	15	15
K. Carlisle; M. O'Sullivan	12	9
J.P. Doyle; D. Kilbride	15	15
R. Smyth; S. Smyth	10	10

Final
J.K.D. Lacey; J. Lawless	15	11	15
J.P. Doyle; D. Kilbride	12	15	6
