= 1955 Thomas Cup qualification =

Tournament details
- Dates: 27 June 1954 – 6 May 1955
- Location: Asian zone: Bangkok; Bombay; Colombo; Hong Kong; Karachi American zone: Winnipeg; European zone: Bonn; Cardiff; Dublin; Dunfermline; Le Havre; Malmö; Stoke-on-Trent Australasian zone: Melbourne

The qualifying process for the 1955 Thomas Cup took place from 27 June 1954 to 6 May 1955 to decide the final teams which will play in the final tournament.

== Qualification process ==
Previously, the qualification process was divided into three regions, the Pacific Zone, the American Zone and the European Zone. More countries competed in qualifying for the Cup, resulting in the process being divided into four regions, the Asian Zone, the American Zone, the European Zone and the Australasian Zone.

Teams in their respective zone will compete in a knockout format. Teams will compete for two days, with two singles and doubles played on the first day and three singles and two doubles played on the next day. The teams that win their respective zone will earn a place in the final tournament to be held in Singapore.

Malaya were the champions of the last Thomas Cup, therefore the team automatically qualified for the inter-zone play-offs.

=== Qualified teams ===
Country	Qualified as	Qualified on	Final appearance
Malaya	1952 Thomas Cup winners	1 June 1952	3rd
India	Asian Zone winners	10 April 1955	2nd
Denmark	European Zone winners	2 April 1955	3rd
United States	American Zone winners	13 March 1955	3rd
Australia	Australasian Zone winners	6 May 1955	1st

== Asian Zone ==
=== Bracket ===
First round
27 June 1954 – Colombo
Pakistan	9
Ceylon	0
30 July 1954 – Bangkok
India	6
Thailand	3
August 1954 – Rangoon
Burma
Hong Kong	w/o
Japan
Bye

Semi-finals
20 November 1954 – Karachi
Pakistan	0
India	9
11 November 1954 – Hong Kong
Hong Kong	6
Japan	3

Final
9 April 1955 – Bombay
India	9
Hong Kong	0

=== First round ===
Pakistan
9
Colombo, Ceylon
27–28 June 1954

Ceylon
0

			1	2	3
1	(Pakistan) (Dominion of Ceylon)	Shamshad Ali; Sam Schoorman	15; 2	15; 5
2	(Pakistan) (Dominion of Ceylon)	Nazir Rajput; Raife Jansz	15; 9	15; 7
3	(Pakistan) (Dominion of Ceylon)	Latif Gani / Mennen Soares; P. Sivalingam / R. P. Nadarajah	15; 5	15; 7
4	(Pakistan) (Dominion of Ceylon)	Shamshad Ali / Rustam Bharucha; N. Suganadeva / V. Narendra	15; 4	15; 4
5	(Pakistan) (Dominion of Ceylon)	Saeed Malik; P. Sivalingam	15; 3	15; 6
6	(Pakistan) (Dominion of Ceylon)	Shamshad Ali; Raife Jansz	15; 7	15; 0
7	(Pakistan) (Dominion of Ceylon)	Nazir Rajput; Sam Schoorman	15; 5	15; 7
8	(Pakistan) (Dominion of Ceylon)	Latif Gani / Mennen Soares; N. Suganadeva / V. Narendra	18; 14	15; 5
9	(Pakistan) (Dominion of Ceylon)	Shamshad Ali / Rustam Bharucha; P. Sivalingam / R. P. Nadarajah	15; 9	15; 8

India
6
Bangkok, Thailand
30–31 July 1954

Thailand
3

			1	2	3
1	(India) (Thailand)	Trilok Nath Seth; Direk Khadjadbhye	15; 8	15; 4
2	(India) (Thailand)	Nandu Natekar; Chinda Promsirintha	15; 1	15; 5
3	(India) (Thailand)	P.S. Chawla / Trilok Nath Seth; Sunthorn Subabandhu / Kamal Sudthivanich	14; 18	10; 15
4	(India) (Thailand)	Ravindra Dongre / Nandu Natekar; Sanguan Anandhanonda / Pinit Pattabongse	15; 6	11; 15	15; 12
5	(India) (Thailand)	Nandu Natekar; Direk Khadjadbhye	6; 15	18; 13	15; 7
6	(India) (Thailand)	Trilok Nath Seth; Chinda Promsirintha	15; 8	15; 3
7	(India) (Thailand)	Amrit Lal Dewan; Pinit Pattabongse	18; 14	6; 15	6; 15
8	(India) (Thailand)	Ravindra Dongre / Nandu Natekar; Sunthorn Subabandhu / Kamal Sudthivanich	15; 10	15; 7
9	(India) (Thailand)	P.S. Chawla / Trilok Nath Seth; Sanguan Anandhanonda / Pinit Pattabongse	3; 15	9; 15

=== Semi-finals ===
India
9
Karachi, Pakistan
20–21 November 1954

Pakistan
0

			1	2	3
1	(India) (Pakistan)	Nandu Natekar; Nazir Rajput	15; 8	15; 2
2	(India) (Pakistan)	Trilok Nath Seth; Shamshad Ali	15; 13	15; 10
3	(India) (Pakistan)	Ravindra Dongre / Nandu Natekar; Latif Gani / Mennen Soares	15; 5	15; 7
4	(India) (Pakistan)	Manoj Guha / Gajanan Hemmady; Shamshad Ali / Irshad Ahmed	11; 15	15; 7	15; 4
5	(India) (Pakistan)	Gajanan Hemmady; Irshad Ahmed	15; 5	11; 15	15; 12
6	(India) (Pakistan)	Nandu Natekar; Shamshad Ali	18; 14	15; 5
7	(India) (Pakistan)	Trilok Nath Seth; Nazir Rajput	15; 12	15; 4
8	(India) (Pakistan)	Manoj Guha / Gajanan Hemmady; Latif Gani / Mennen Soares	15; 3	15; 7
9	(India) (Pakistan)	Ravindra Dongre / Nandu Natekar; Shamshad Ali / Irshad Ahmed	15; 8	15; 3

Hong Kong
6
Kowloon, Hong Kong
11–12 November 1954

Japan
3

			1	2	3
1	(Hong Kong) (Japan)	Ramon Young; Yoshiaki Sato	15; 8	15; 9
2	(Hong Kong) (Japan)	Bill Funk; Humio Mochizuki	15; 6	15; 7
3	(Hong Kong) (Japan)	Robert Tay / Patrick Wong; Michiaki Oka / Yoshiaki Sato	15; 12	15; 12
4	(Hong Kong) (Japan)	Low Keat Soo / Ramon Young; Humio Mochizuki / Hiroshi Sugita	15; 6	15; 12
5	(Hong Kong) (Japan)	Ramon Young; Humio Mochizuki	8; 15	10; 15
6	(Hong Kong) (Japan)	Bill Funk; Yoshiaki Sato	11; 15	15; 11	10; 15
7	(Hong Kong) (Japan)	Junior Pomeroy; Michiaki Oka	8; 15	8; 15
8	(Hong Kong) (Japan)	Robert Tay / Patrick Wong; Humio Mochizuki / Hiroshi Sugita	11; 15	15; 11	15; 13
9	(Hong Kong) (Japan)	Low Keat Soo / Ramon Young; Michiaki Oka / Yoshiaki Sato	15; 4	15; 2

=== Final ===
India
9
Bombay, India
9–10 April 1955

Hong Kong
0

			1	2	3
1	(India) (Hong Kong)	Nandu Natekar; Ramon Young	15; 1	15; 7
2	(India) (Hong Kong)	Amrit Lal Dewan; Junior Pomeroy	15; 1	15; 0
3	(India) (Hong Kong)	Ravindra Dongre / Nandu Natekar; Robert Tay / Patrick Wong	15; 3	15; 9
4	(India) (Hong Kong)	Manoj Guha / Gajanan Hemmady; Low Keat Soo / Junior Pomeroy	15; 3	15; 4
5	(India) (Hong Kong)	Amrit Lal Dewan; Ramon Young	15; 7	15; 4
6	(India) (Hong Kong)	Nandu Natekar; Junior Pomeroy	15; 3	15; 4
7	(India) (Hong Kong)	P.S. Chawla; Robert Tay	15; 6	15; 2
8	(India) (Hong Kong)	Manoj Guha / Gajanan Hemmady; Robert Tay / Patrick Wong	15; 6	15; 5
9	(India) (Hong Kong)	Ravindra Dongre / Nandu Natekar; Low Keat Soo / Junior Pomeroy	15; 9	15; 1

== American Zone ==
=== Bracket ===
Final
12 March 1955 – Winnipeg
United States	5
Canada	4

=== Final ===
United States
5
Winnipeg, Canada
12–13 March 1955

Canada
4

			1	2	3
1	(United States) (Canada)	Dick Mitchell; Donald Smythe	17; 16	8; 15	15; 3
2	(United States) (Canada)	Joey Alston; David McTaggart	4; 15	15; 6	11; 15
3	(United States) (Canada)	Carl Loveday / Bob Williams; T. Darryl Thompson / Gordon Simpson	15; 7	15; 9
4	(United States) (Canada)	Joey Alston / Wynn Rogers; Budd Porter / Donald Smythe	18; 17	15; 9
5	(United States) (Canada)	Dick Mitchell; David McTaggart	4; 15	15; 9	7; 15
6	(United States) (Canada)	Joey Alston; Donald Smythe	15; 7	16; 17	14; 17
7	(United States) (Canada)	Bill Berry; Beverley Westcott	11; 15	12; 15
8	(United States) (Canada)	Carl Loveday / Bob Williams; Budd Porter / Donald Smythe	15; 11	15; 12
9	(United States) (Canada)	Joey Alston / Wynn Rogers; T. Darryl Thompson / Gordon Simpson	15; 8	15; 5

== European Zone ==
=== Bracket ===
First round
Sweden
Bye
France
Bye
13 November 1954 – Bonn
England	9
West Germany	0
Belgium
Bye
Bye
Denmark
Bye
Wales
Bye
Scotland
Bye
Ireland

Second round
18 December 1954 – Le Havre
Sweden	9
France	0
November 1954 – Brussels
England	w/o
Belgium
7 December 1954 – Cardiff
Denmark	9
Wales	0
26 November 1954 – Dunfermline
Scotland	3
Ireland	6

Semi-finals
28 February 1955 – Stoke
Sweden	7
England	2
10 December 1954 – Dublin
Denmark	9
Ireland	0

Final
1 April 1955 – Stockholm
Sweden	1
Denmark	8

=== First round ===
England
9
Bonn, West Germany
13–14 November 1954

West Germany
0

			1	2	3
1	(England) (Germany)	John D. McColl; Hans Walbrück	15; 2	15; 6
2	(England) (Germany)	F. John Shaw; Hans Grashof	15; 6	15; 9
3	(England) (Germany)	John Best / Warwick Shute; Hans Riegel / Hans Walbrück	15; 5	15; 6
4	(England) (Germany)	Anthony Jordan / John D. McColl; Hans Eschweiler / Günter Ropertz	15; 2	15; 4
5	(England) (Germany)	F. John Shaw; Hans Walbrück	15; 1	15; 7
6	(England) (Germany)	Anthony Jordan; Hans Eschweiler	15; 2	15; 3
7	(England) (Germany)	John D. McColl; Hans Grashof	15; 5	15; 4
8	(England) (Germany)	John Best / Warwick Shute; Hans Eschweiler / Günter Ropertz	15; 5	15; 7
9	(England) (Germany)	Anthony Jordan / John D. McColl; Hans Riegel / Hans Walbrück	15; 5	15; 4

=== Second round ===
Ireland
6
Dunfermline, Scotland
26–27 November 1954

Scotland
3

			1	2	3
1	(Republic of Ireland) (Scotland)	Frank Peard; Alastair Russell	15; 10	7; 15	5; 15
2	(Republic of Ireland) (Scotland)	James Doyle; W. Ross	15; 2	15; 1
3	(Republic of Ireland) (Scotland)	Jim Fitzgibbon / Frank Peard; Donald Ross / W. Ross	15; 11	18; 14
4	(Republic of Ireland) (Scotland)	James Doyle / S. S. J. Huey; J. C. McKay / Alastair Russell	15; 8	15; 7
5	(Republic of Ireland) (Scotland)	James Doyle; Alastair Russell	15; 12	10; 15	8; 15
6	(Republic of Ireland) (Scotland)	J. A. D. Lack; Ian Hutchinson	4; 15	2; 15
7	(Republic of Ireland) (Scotland)	Frank Peard; W. Ross	15; 3	15; 7
8	(Republic of Ireland) (Scotland)	James Doyle / S. S. J. Huey; Donald Ross / W. Ross	15; 9	15; 10
9	(Republic of Ireland) (Scotland)	J. Lacy / Frank Peard; J. C. McKay / Alastair Russell	15; 13	15; 6

Denmark
9
Cardiff, Wales
7–8 December 1954

Wales
0

			1	2	3
1	(Denmark) (Wales)	Finn Kobberø; F. Griffith	15; 8	12; 15	15; 9
2	(Denmark) (Wales)	Jørn Skaarup; J. C. Morgan	15; 4	15; 3
3	(Denmark) (Wales)	Jørgen Hansen / Finn Kobberø; P. R. Davis / F. Griffith	15; 10	15; 4
4	(Denmark) (Wales)	Palle Granlund / Poul-Erik Nielsen; J. C. Morgan / H. Richards	15; 10	15; 4
5	(Denmark) (Wales)	Finn Kobberø; J. C. Morgan	15; 0	15; 0
6	(Denmark) (Wales)	Jørgen Hansen; H. Richards	15; 0	15; 5
7	(Denmark) (Wales)	Jørn Skaarup; F. Griffith	15; 1	15; 1
8	(Denmark) (Wales)	Jørgen Hansen / Finn Kobberø; J. C. Morgan / H. Richards	15; 2	15; 6
9	(Denmark) (Wales)	Poul-Erik Nielsen / Jørn Skaarup; P. R. Davis / F. Griffith	15; 4	15; 0

Sweden
9
Le Havre, France
18–19 December 1954

France
0

			1	2	3
1	(Sweden) (France)	Berndt Dahlberg; Henri Pellizza	15; 3	15; 3
2	(Sweden) (France)	Bertil Glans; Paul Ailloud	15; 1	15; 5
3	(Sweden) (France)	Bertil Glans / Berndt Dahlberg; Henri Pellizza / Paul Ailloud	15; 4	15; 6
4	(Sweden) (France)	Nils Jonson / Stellan Mohlin; Ghislain Vasseur / Pierre Lenoir	15; 4	15; 3
5	(Sweden) (France)	Bertil Glans; Henri Pellizza	15; 0	15; 0
6	(Sweden) (France)	Berndt Dahlberg; Paul Ailloud	15; 1	15; 4
7	(Sweden) (France)	Nils Jonson; Ghislain Vasseur	15; 1	15; 0
8	(Sweden) (France)	Nils Jonson / Stellan Mohlin; Henri Pellizza / Paul Ailloud	15; 4	15; 12
9	(Sweden) (France)	Bertil Glans / Berndt Dahlberg; Ghislain Vasseur / Pierre Lenoir	15; 8	15; 12

=== Semi-finals ===
Sweden
7
Stoke-on-Trent, England
28 February–1 March 1955

England
2

			1	2	3
1	(Sweden) (England)	Nils Jonson; John D. McColl	15; 8	13; 15	15; 4
2	(Sweden) (England)	Bertil Glans; Anthony Jordan	15; 11	15; 2
3	(Sweden) (England)	Inge Blomberg / Knut Malmgren; John Best / Warwick Shute	11; 15	0; 15
4	(Sweden) (England)	Nils Jonson / Stellan Mohlin; Anthony Jordan / John D. McColl	15; 9	9; 15	15; 8
5	(Sweden) (England)	Inge Blomberg; John Best	15; 7	15; 5
6	(Sweden) (England)	Nils Jonson; Anthony Jordan	15; 9	15; 13
7	(Sweden) (England)	Bertil Glans; John D. McColl	15; 8	15; 10
8	(Sweden) (England)	Nils Jonson / Stellan Mohlin; John Best / Warwick Shute	13; 15	4; 15
9	(Sweden) (England)	Inge Blomberg / Knut Malmgren; Anthony Jordan / John D. McColl	15; 13	15; 6

Denmark
9
Dublin, Ireland
10–11 December 1954

Ireland
0

			1	2	3
1	(Denmark) (Republic of Ireland)	Finn Kobberø; Frank Peard	15; 1	15; 3
2	(Denmark) (Republic of Ireland)	Jørn Skaarup; James Doyle	15; 3	15; 3
3	(Denmark) (Republic of Ireland)	Jørgen Hansen / Finn Kobberø; Jim Fitzgibbon / Frank Peard	15; 5	15; 7
4	(Denmark) (Republic of Ireland)	Palle Granlund / Poul-Erik Nielsen; James Doyle / S. S. Huey	15; 13	15; 6
5	(Denmark) (Republic of Ireland)	Finn Kobberø; James Doyle	15; 0	15; 3
6	(Denmark) (Republic of Ireland)	Jørn Skaarup; Frank Peard	12; 15	15; 5	15; 4
7	(Denmark) (Republic of Ireland)	Palle Granlund; Charles McCormack	15; 2	17; 3
8	(Denmark) (Republic of Ireland)	Jørgen Hansen / Finn Kobberø; James Doyle / S. S. Huey	10; 15	15; 9	15; 3
9	(Denmark) (Republic of Ireland)	Palle Granlund / Poul-Erik Nielsen; Jim Fitzgibbon / Frank Peard	15; 12	7; 15	18; 16

=== Final ===
Denmark
8
Stockholm, Sweden
1–2 April 1955

Sweden
1

			1	2	3
1	(Denmark) (Sweden)	Jørn Skaarup; Leif Ekedahl	18; 13	17; 14
2	(Denmark) (Sweden)	Finn Kobberø; Bertil Glans	15; 10	15; 11
3	(Denmark) (Sweden)	Ove Eilertsen / Ole Mertz; Nils Jonson / Stellan Mohlin	15; 11	15; 7
4	(Denmark) (Sweden)	Jørgen Hansen / Finn Kobberø; Inge Blomberg / Knut Malmgren	15; 1	15; 4
5	(Denmark) (Sweden)	Jørgen Hansen; Nils Jonson	15; 8	15; 1
6	(Denmark) (Sweden)	Finn Kobberø; Leif Ekedahl	15; 10	15; 6
7	(Denmark) (Sweden)	Jørn Skaarup; Bertil Glans	15; 9	4; 15	4; 15
8	(Denmark) (Sweden)	Ove Eilertsen / Ole Mertz; Inge Blomberg / Knut Malmgren	15; 3	15; 9
9	(Denmark) (Sweden)	Jørgen Hansen / Finn Kobberø; Nils Jonson / Stellan Mohlin	15; 2	15; 7

== Australasian Zone ==
=== Bracket ===
Final
5 May 1955 – Melbourne
Australia	7
New Zealand	2

=== Final ===
Australia
7
Melbourne, Australia
5–6 May 1955

New Zealand
2

			1	2	3
1	(Australia) (New Zealand)	Don Murray; Paul Skelt	15; 2	17; 18	15; 5
2	(Australia) (New Zealand)	Stan Russell; Jeff Robson	11; 15	13; 15
3	(Australia) (New Zealand)	Cliff Cutt / Don Murray; Anthony T. Skelt / Paul Skelt	15; 6	15; 2
4	(Australia) (New Zealand)	Allan McCabe / Stan Russell; Jeff Robson / Leith Shand	15; 11	15; 7
5	(Australia) (New Zealand)	Cliff Cutt; Leith Shand	15; 6	15; 8
6	(Australia) (New Zealand)	Don Murray; Jeff Robson	7; 7	9; 17
7	(Australia) (New Zealand)	Stan Russell; Paul Skelt	15; 5	15; 10
8	(Australia) (New Zealand)	Cliff Cutt / Don Murray; Jeff Robson / Leith Shand	15; 10	15; 9
9	(Australia) (New Zealand)	Allan McCabe / Stan Russell; Anthony T. Skelt / Paul Skelt	15; 6	15; 9
