= 1958 Irish Badminton Close =

1958 Irish Close Badminton Championships
Tournament details
- Dates: 12 December 1958– 14 December 1958
- Venue: Midland Branch Hall, Whitehall Road, Terenure
- Location: Dublin, Ireland

The 1958 Irish Close Badminton Championships was a national closed badminton tournament held in the Midland Branch Hall, Whitehall Road, Terenure, Dublin, Ireland from 12 to 14 December 1958.

== Final results ==
Category	Winners	Runners-up
Men's singles	J.P. Doyle	G. Henderson
Women's singles	M. O'Sullivan	Y. Kelly
Men's doubles	G. Henderson; C. McCormack	J.J. Fitzgibbon; K. Carlisle
Women's doubles	M. O'Sullivan; Y. Kelly	D. Donaldson; Mrs P. Sharkey
Mixed doubles	K. Carlisle; L. Rea	J.P. Doyle; M. O'Sullivan
