= 1955 Thomas Cup knockout stage =

Badminton tournament

The knockout stage for the 1955 Thomas Cup began on 24 May 1955 with the first-round knockout and ended on 5 June with the final tie.

== Qualified teams ==
The teams that won their zonal tie qualified for the final knockout stage.

Group	Winners
CH	Malaya
AS	India
AM	United States
AU	Australia
EU	Denmark

== Bracket ==
First round
Malaya
Bye
24 May 1955 – Singapore
United States	3
India	6
27 May 1955 – Singapore
Australia	0
Denmark	9

Second round
Malaya
Bye
31 May 1955 – Singapore
India	3
Denmark	6

Challenge round
4 June 1955 – Singapore
Malaya	8
Denmark	1

== First round ==
In the first round of the inter-zone playoffs India avenged its 1952 loss to the US by winning 4 of 5 singles matches and holding its own in doubles to defeat the Americans 6–3. Although Australia played some competitive matches against European powerhouses Denmark, it was unable to win any of them (0–9).

=== United States vs India ===
United States
3
Singapore Badminton Stadium, Singapore
24–25 May 1955

India
6

			1	2	3
1	(United States) (India)	Dick Mitchell; Nandu Natekar	7; 15	13; 15
2	(United States) (India)	Joey Alston; Trilok Nath Seth	17; 14	17; 16
3	(United States) (India)	Wynn Rogers / Bob Williams; Manoj Guha / Gajanan Hemmady	4; 15	8; 15
4	(United States) (India)	Manuel Armendariz / Carl Loveday; Ravindra Dongre / Nandu Natekar	10; 15	15; 13	15; 9
5	(United States) (India)	Carl Loveday; P.S. Chawla	17; 15	11; 15	12; 15
6	(United States) (India)	Joey Alston; Nandu Natekar	15; 7	9; 15	8; 15
7	(United States) (India)	Dick Mitchell; Trilok Nath Seth	7; 15	15; 8	11; 15
8	(United States) (India)	Wynn Rogers / Bob Williams; Ravindra Dongre / Nandu Natekar	15; 4	15; 5
9	(United States) (India)	Manuel Armendariz / Carl Loveday; Manoj Guha / Gajanan Hemmady	11; 15	17; 14	8; 15

=== Denmark vs Australia ===
Denmark
9
Singapore Badminton Stadium, Singapore
27–28 May 1955

Australia
0

			1	2	3
1	(Denmark) (Australia)	Finn Kobberø; Don Murray	15; 10	9; 15	15; 2
2	(Denmark) (Australia)	Jørn Skaarup; Stan Russell	15; 8	15; 8
3	(Denmark) (Australia)	Jørgen Hansen / Finn Kobberø; Cliff Cutt / Don Murray	15; 7	18; 14
4	(Denmark) (Australia)	Ove Eilertsen / Ole Mertz; Allan McCabe / Stan Russell	15; 8	15; 13
5	(Denmark) (Australia)	Finn Kobberø; Stan Russell	15; 12	15; 1
6	(Denmark) (Australia)	Jørn Skaarup; Don Murray	18; 13	15; 2
7	(Denmark) (Australia)	Ole Jensen; Rex Collins	15; 11	15; 3
8	(Denmark) (Australia)	Jørgen Hansen / Finn Kobberø; Allan McCabe / Stan Russell	15; 3	15; 1
9	(Denmark) (Australia)	Ove Eilertsen / Ole Jensen; Cliff Cutt / Don Murray	15; 8	15; 10

== Second round ==
=== Denmark vs India ===
Young Kobbero was the star of the inter-zone final between Denmark and India. He won all four of his matches which included a fine three game duel with India's stylish Nandu Natekar, leading Denmark to a 6–3 victory. Thus, Denmark emerged as the challenger to cup-holder Malaya.

Denmark
6
Singapore Badminton Stadium, Singapore
31 May–1 June 1955

India
3

			1	2	3
1	(Denmark) (India)	Jørn Skaarup; Nandu Natekar	8; 15	13; 15
2	(Denmark) (India)	Finn Kobberø; Trilok Nath Seth	18; 14	15; 11
3	(Denmark) (India)	Ove Eilertsen / Ole Mertz; Ravindra Dongre / Nandu Natekar	3; 15	15; 18
4	(Denmark) (India)	Jørgen Hansen / Finn Kobberø; Manoj Guha / Gajanan Hemmady	15; 12	15; 5
5	(Denmark) (India)	Finn Kobberø; Nandu Natekar	8; 15	15; 6	15; 10
6	(Denmark) (India)	Ole Jensen; P.S. Chawla	15; 4	18; 14
7	(Denmark) (India)	Jørn Skaarup; Trilok Nath Seth	15; 10	15; 3
8	(Denmark) (India)	Ove Eilertsen / Ole Mertz; Manoj Guha / Gajanan Hemmady	10; 15	15; 3	3; 15
9	(Denmark) (India)	Jørgen Hansen / Finn Kobberø; Ravindra Dongre / Nandu Natekar	15; 8	15; 3

== Challenge round ==
=== Malaya vs Denmark ===
The competitive swan song of Malaya's venerable Wong Peng Soon was successful though he dropped a game to both Kobbero and Jørn Skaarup. Eddie Choong, with two All-England singles titles already to his name, made his Thomas Cup debut by beating both Kobbero and Skaarup in straight games. Ong Poh Lim was once again stalwart, winning his match at third singles and both of his doubles partnered by veteran Ooi Teik Hock. The Danes could muster only one victory which came in doubles and largely from the efforts of Kobbero's partner Jorgen Hammergaard Hansen whose powerful smash lived up to his name. Winning 8 matches to 1, Malaya thus retained the Cup.

Malaya
8
Singapore Badminton Stadium, Singapore
4–5 June 1955

Denmark
1

			1	2	3
1	(Malaysia) (Denmark)	Eddy Choong; Finn Kobberø	15; 6	15; 4
2	(Malaysia) (Denmark)	Wong Peng Soon; Jørn Skaarup	15; 9	16; 18	15; 4
3	(Malaysia) (Denmark)	Tan Jin Eong / Lim Kee Fong; Ole Mertz / Ove Eilertsen	15; 9	15; 3
4	(Malaysia) (Denmark)	Ong Poh Lim / Ooi Teik Hock; Finn Kobberø / Jørgen Hansen	15; 4	15; 8
5	(Malaysia) (Denmark)	Ong Poh Lim; Ole Jensen	15; 10	15; 8
6	(Malaysia) (Denmark)	Wong Peng Soon; Finn Kobberø	12; 15	15; 0	15; 7
7	(Malaysia) (Denmark)	Eddy Choong; Jørn Skaarup	15; 10	15; 9
8	(Malaysia) (Denmark)	Tan Jin Eong / Lim Kee Fong; Finn Kobberø / Jørgen Hansen	13; 18	15; 4	6; 15
9	(Malaysia) (Denmark)	Ong Poh Lim / Ooi Teik Hock; Ole Mertz / Ove Eilerstsen	15; 8	15; 1
