= 1955 Thomas Cup squads =

This article lists the squads for the 1955 Thomas Cup participating teams. The age listed for each player is on 24 May 1955 which was the first day of the tournament.

== Teams ==
=== Australia ===
Five players represented Australia in the 1955 Thomas Cup.

Name	DoB/Age
Allan McCabe	1920 (aged 34–35)
Don Murray	18 July 1929 (aged 25)
Stan Russell	1930 (aged 24–25)
Cliff Cutt	1930 (aged 24–25)
Rex Collins	1934 (aged 20–21)

=== Denmark ===
Six players represented Denmark in the 1955 Thomas Cup.

Name	DoB/Age
Jørn Skaarup	13 September 1925 (aged 29)
Jørgen Hammergaard Hansen	1930 (aged 21–22)
Ole Jensen	5 June 1928 (aged 26)
Finn Kobberø	13 March 1936 (aged 19)
Ole Mertz	26 November 1931 (aged 23)
Ove Eilertsen	1929 (aged 25–26)

=== India ===
Seven players represented India in the 1955 Thomas Cup.

Name	DoB/Age
Amrit Lal Dewan	1927 (aged 24–25)
Nandu Natekar	12 May 1933 (aged 22)
Manoj Guha	13 September 1927 (aged 24)
Gajanan Hemmady	1927 (aged 24–25)
P. S. Chawla	1929 (aged 25–26)
Ravindra Dongre	1931 (aged 23–24)
Trilok Nath Seth	1929 (aged 25–26)

=== Malaya ===
Six players represented Malaya in the 1955 Thomas Cup.

Name	DoB/Age
Eddy Choong	29 May 1931 (aged 23)
Wong Peng Soon	17 February 1917 (aged 38)
Tan Jin Eong	1927 (aged 27–28)
Lim Kee Fong	19 June 1922 (aged 32)
Ong Poh Lim	18 November 1923 (aged 31)
Ooi Teik Hock	13 November 1920 (aged 34)

=== United States ===
Six players represented the United States in the 1955 Thomas Cup.

Name	DoB/Age
Joe Alston	20 December 1926 (aged 28)
Carl Loveday	19 March 1921 (aged 34)
Bob Williams	1923 (aged 31–32)
Thomas Wynn Rogers	1919 (aged 35–36)
Dick Mitchell	18 July 1920 (aged 34)
Manuel Armendariz	1934 (aged 20–21)
