= 1959 Irish Badminton Close =

1959 Irish Close Badminton Championships
Tournament details
- Dates: 5 December 1959– 12 December 1959
- Venue: Midland Branch Hall, Whitehall Road, Terenure
- Location: Dublin, Ireland

The 1959 Irish Close Badminton Championships was a national closed badminton tournament held in the Midland Branch Hall, Whitehall Road, Terenure, Dublin, Ireland from 5 to 12 December 1959.

== Final results ==
Category	Winners	Runners-up
Men's singles	J.P. Doyle	F. Cinnamond
Women's singles	M. O'Sullivan	Y. Kelly
Men's doubles	G. Henderson; C. McCormack	J.P. Doyle; K. Carlisle
Women's doubles	M. O'Sullivan; Y. Kelly	L. Rea; Mrs Smyth
Mixed doubles	K. Carlisle; L. Rea	C. McCormack; Y. Kelly
