= Barbara Good =

Barbara Good may refer to:

- Barbara Good (The Good Life), a television sitcom character
- Barbara J. Good (born c. 1920), Irish badminton player
