= 1952 All England Badminton Championships =

1952 All England Championships
Tournament details
- Dates: 19 March 1952– 22 March 1952
- Edition: 42nd
- Venue: Empress Hall, Earls Court
- Location: London

The 1952 All England Championships was a badminton tournament held at the Empress Hall, Earls Court, London, England, from 19 to 22 March 1952.

== Final results ==
Category	Winners	Runners-up	Score
Men's singles	(Malaysia) Wong Peng Soon	(Malaysia) Eddy Choong	15–11, 18–13
Women's singles	(Denmark) Tonny Ahm	(Denmark) Aase Schiøtt Jacobsen	11–4, 11–2
Men's doubles	(Malaysia) Eddy Choong & David Ewe Choong	(Denmark) Poul Holm & Ole Jensen	9–15, 15–12, 15–7
Women's doubles	(Denmark) Tonny Ahm & Aase Schiøtt Jacobsen	(England) Queenie Allen & Betty Uber	18–15, 15–4
Mixed doubles	(Denmark) Poul Holm & Tonny Ahm	(Denmark) Ole Jensen & Aase Schiøtt Jacobsen	15–4, 10–15, 15–7

Over 200 entries were received for the 1952 championships, a record.

=== Men's singles ===
==== Section 1 ====
Round of 32
(Malaysia) Wong Peng Soon +	15	15
(England) P G Alcorn	2	5
(Denmark) Ole Jensen
(England) Warwick Shute
(Republic of Ireland) Frank Peard	15	15
(England) R Radford	7	11
(United States) Wynn Rogers
(Scotland) R S Hodge
(Malaysia) Johnny Heah +	15	15
(England) P V Wilford	1	2
(Denmark) Jørgen Hammergaard Hansen
(Denmark) Ole Mertz
(Sweden) Nils Jonson +
(England) Tony Jordan
(England) J A Broadhurst
(Denmark) John Nygaard

Round of 16
(Malaysia) Peng Soon	15	15
(Denmark) Jensen	6	1
(Republic of Ireland) Peard
(United States) Rogers
(Malaysia) Heah	15	15
(Denmark) H-Hansen	12	4
(Sweden) Jonson	15	15
(England) Broadhurst	0	5

Quarterfinals
(Malaysia) Peng Soon	15	15
(Republic of Ireland) Peard	4	4
(Malaysia) Heah	15	11	17
(Sweden) Jonsson	11	15	14

Semifinals
(Malaysia) Peng Soon	15	15
(Malaysia) Heah	2	2

==== Section 2 ====
Round of 32
(Malaysia) Eddy Choong +	15	15
(Malaysia) Khoo Eng Chin	1	3
(England) A L Salway
(England) M Robinson
(Denmark) Ove Eilertsen
(England) Jack McColl
(Sweden) Knut Malmgren +
(Republic of Ireland) James 'Chick' Doyle
(Denmark) Poul Holm +	15	15
(Malaysia) S H Lim	4	4
(Malaysia) David Ewe Choong	15	15
(Malaysia) L T Lee	8	2
(Sweden) Inge Blomberg +	15	15
(Republic of Ireland) J.J. Fitzgibbon	2	0
(England) John Best
(England) Noel Radford

Round of 16
(Malaysia) Choong E	w/o
(England) Salway
(Denmark) Eilertsen	18	9	15
(Sweden) Malmgren	15	15	11
(Denmark) Holm	15	15
(Malaysia) Choong DE	6	11
(Sweden) Blomberg	15	15
(England) Radford	9	9

Quarterfinals
(Malaysia) Choong E	15	15
(Denmark) Eilertsen	7	0
(Denmark) Holm	3	15	15
(Sweden) Blomberg	15	8	5

Semifinals
(Malaysia) Choong E	15	15
(Denmark) Holm	10	1

+ Denotes seeded player

=== Women's singles ===
Round of 16
(Denmark) Tonny Ahm +
(England) Mavis Henderson
(Republic of Ireland) Jean Lawless
(Sweden) A Peterssen
(Denmark) Aase Winther
(Scotland) Nancy Horner
(England) June White
(Denmark) Aase Schiøtt Jacobsen
(England) S L Ripley
(England) Ursula Smith
(Denmark) E Christensen
(England) Elizabeth O'Beirne +
(Republic of Ireland) B I Donaldson
(England) Audrey Stone
(England) Iris Cooley

Quarterfinals
(Denmark) Ahm	11	11
(Republic of Ireland) Lawless	2	4
(Denmark) Winther	11	11	12
(Scotland) Horner	12	7	10
(Denmark) Jacobsen	11	11
(England) Smith	5	5
(England) O'Beirne	11	11
(England) Stone	4	2

Semifinals
(Denmark) Ahm	11	11
(Denmark) Winther	8	4
(Denmark) Jacobsen	12	11
(England) O'Beirne	11	8

Final
(Denmark) Ahm	11	11
(Denmark) Jacobsen	4	2
