= James 'Chick' Doyle =

Irish badminton player (1930–1985)

J.P. 'Chick' Doyle
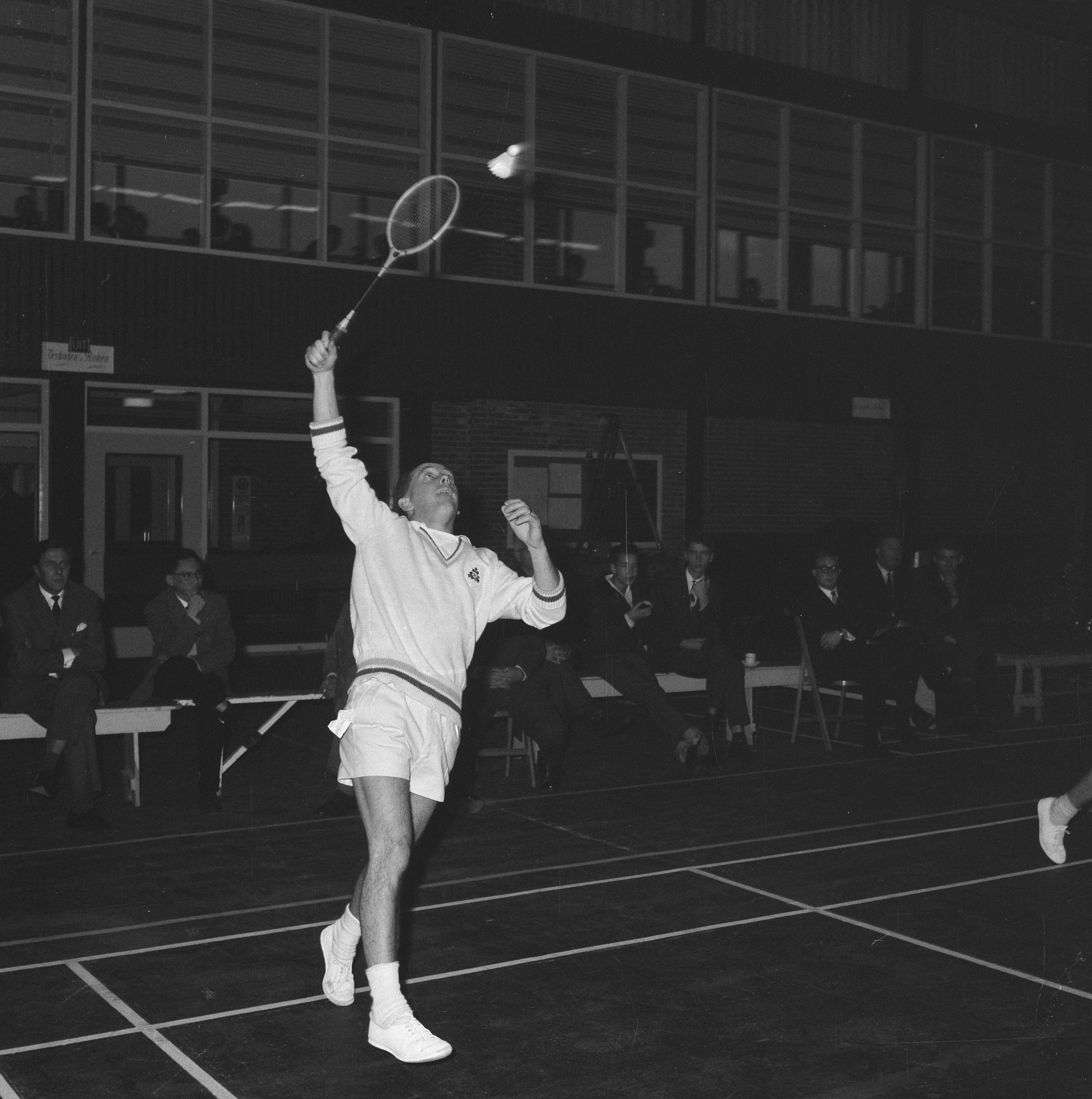
- Doyle in 1963

Personal information
- Born: James Patrick Doyle; 12 April 1930, Dublin, Ireland
- Died: 21 May 1985 (aged 55), Dublin, Ireland

Sport
- Country: Ireland
- Sport: Badminton

James Patrick 'Chick' Doyle was an Irish badminton player and coach. He was coached by Frank Peard and won eleven Irish National Badminton Championships titles in men's singles and doubles in the period 1954–1964.

== Early and personal life ==
Chick Doyle was born to Edward James ("Jimmy") Doyle, an employee of the Dublin Gas Company, and Josephine Doyle (née McNamara) in April 1930. Reputedly the name 'Chick' was attributed to his time working as a chicken sexer in Australia, though this is apocryphal.

He was the eldest of three siblings. His sister Ursula Doyle (born 1931), was a child performer, later actress, stage director and second wife of Jimmy O'Dea, and his brother Noel Doyle (born 1932), was also a child performer and entertainer before emigrating to Canada. In 1958 Doyle married Marie Clarke. They had four children. Besides his playing ability, Doyle was noted in badminton circles for his humour and enthusiasm, as well as his teetotalism, being a non-smoker and propensity for motion sickness.

His daughter Elaine Doyle was capped fifteen times for Ireland and won a Ladies doubles Irish National Badminton Championships title in 1986. Elaine married Limerick hurler Shane Fitzgibbon in 1991. Their son, Doyle's grandson, John Fitzgibbon also played intercounty hurling for Limerick.

== Playing career ==
With the encouragement of his father, Doyle began playing in the Dublin Gas Company club where his talent was recognised by Geoff Trapnell, reportedly putting in six hours practice per day. By 1948 was playing league badminton with the club. In that same year he first appeared playing at national tournaments. The Irish Times reports of the Irish Close Badminton tournament of December 1948 lists Doyle as losing in the first round of the senior men's singles to Frank Peard and competing unsuccessfully in a number of junior events. As well as being a player, Peard was instrumental in implementing intensive coaching schemes which Doyle benefitted from. Doyle's playing career progressed rapidly and by December 1949 he was playing for the Midland (now Leinster) branch interprovincial team at the age of nineteen.

Doyle was first called up to the Ireland national badminton team for their match against Scotland in 1951 and would continue to be selected for Ireland up to 1964. He played thirty times for Ireland. 1951 also saw Doyle first reach the final of the men's singles in the Irish National Badminton Championships, with Frank Peard beating his protégé in three sets. In 1952 he emigrated to Australia. Doyle continued his playing career in Australia in 1952 and 1953, playing for the Victoria state badminton team and competing in the Australian National Badminton Championships, where he was a runner up in the men's doubles in 1952. He placed seventh in the 1952 Australian men's singles rankings. He subsequently returned to Ireland. 1955 saw Doyle emerge as winner of the men's singles in the Scottish Open tournament and in 1956, he went on to win the men's singles in the Irish Open tournament. Doyle maintained his dominance in Irish men's badminton until 1961, when for the first time in a decade he lost to another Irish player, Lennox Robinson, at an interprovincial tournament.

Over the course of his playing career, Doyle achieved an unprecedented eight consecutive title wins in men's singles at the Irish National Badminton Championships, a feat equaled only by Irish Olympian professional badminton player Scott Evans in 2012. Doyle and Evans are second only to Michael Watt in total Irish men's singles title wins, with Watt achieving a record ten non-consecutive men's singles Irish titles as a player. Doyle's style of play was described as a mixture of good footwork, the use of varying strokes and the ability to deceive opponents.

== Later life ==
Following his retirement from playing, Doyle took up coaching and administration. In 1960, he was listed among the Midland Branch 'Entertainment' committee members. By 1968 he was serving on Midland branch executive committee and was president of the Leinster branch of the Badminton Union of Ireland from 1973 to 1978. In 1976, he became a partner in the Great Outdoors sports shop in Dublin, where he opened the Chick Doyle racquet shop. By 1980, Doyle was a Vice President of the Badminton Union of Ireland. He died of heart related health problems in 1985.

== Achievements ==
=== Irish National Badminton Championships ===
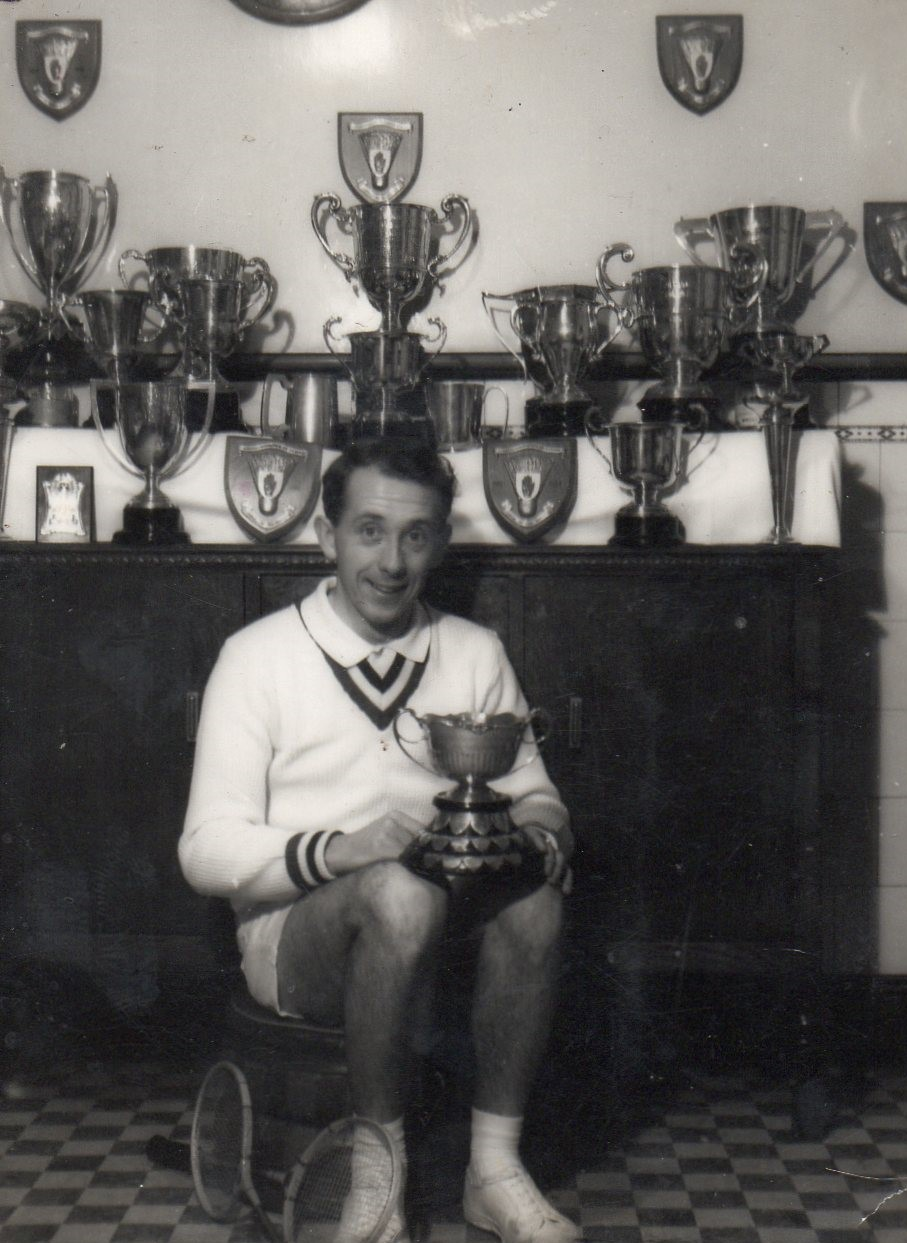
J.P. "Chick" Doyle, Irish Badminton Champion with trophies (late 1950s)

Doyle's playing record in the Irish Close championships. (Note: During this time period, the Irish National Badminton Championships were known as the Irish Close Championships, and took place each December for the year following. Therefore, the 1951 finals were played in December 1950, etc.)

==== Men's Singles ====
Year	Event	Result	Opponent
1949	Men's singles	First round	Frank Peard
1950	Men's singles	Second round	Frank Peard
1951	Men's singles	Second round	Kenneth Diplock
1952	Men's singles	Runner Up	Frank Peard
1954	Men's singles	Winner	Frank Peard
1955	Men's singles	Winner	Frank Peard
1956	Men's singles	Winner	Charles McCormack
1957	Men's singles	Winner	Frank Peard
1958	Men's singles	Winner	Robert Harris
1959	Men's singles	Winner	George Henderson
1960	Men's singles	Winner	Frank Cinnamond
1961	Men's singles	Winner	Robert Harris
1962	Men's singles	Semi final	Winston Wilkinson
1963	Men's singles	Runner Up	Robert Harris
1964	Men's singles	Runner Up	Robert Harris

==== Men's Doubles ====
Year	Event	Result	Partner
1952	Men's doubles	Runner Up	Desmond Lacey
1954	Men's doubles	Runner Up	Desmond Lacey
1955	Men's doubles	Runner Up	Desmond Lacey
1956	Men's doubles	Winner	Desmond Lacey
1957	Men's doubles	Runner Up	Desmond Lacey
1960	Men's doubles	Runner Up	Kenneth Carlisle
1961	Men's doubles	Runner Up	Charlie McCormack
1963	Men's doubles	Winner	Winston Wilkinson
1964	Men's doubles	Winner	Winston Wilkinson

==== Mixed Doubles ====
Year	Event	Result	Partner
1956	Mixed doubles	Runner Up	D. Kilbride
1957	Mixed doubles	Semi final	Mary O'Sullivan
1959	Mixed doubles	Runner Up	Mary O'Sullivan
1961	Mixed doubles	Runner Up	Susan Peard

=== Irish provincial competitions ===
==== Ulster Open (Note: There was no Ulster Open held in 1955.) ====
Year	Event	Result	Partner
1951	Men's singles	Runner Up	-
1952	Men's singles	Winner	-
1952	Men's doubles	Runner Up	Desmond Lacey
1953	Men's singles	Winner	-
1953	Mixed doubles	Winner	D. Kilbride
1954	Men's singles	Winner	-
1954	Men's doubles	Winner	Desmond Lacey
1956	Men's singles	Winner	-
1956	Mixed doubles	Winner	D. Kilbride
1957	Men's singles	Winner	-
1958	Men's singles	Winner	-
1958	Men's doubles	Winner	Charles McCormack
1959	Men's singles	Semi final	-
1959	Men's doubles	Winner	Charles McCormack
1959	Mixed doubles	Winner	Yvonne Kelly
1960	Men's singles	Winner	-

==== Leinster Close (Note: formerly the Midland branch.) ====
Year	Event	Result	Partner
1949	Men's singles	Semi final	-
1950	Men's singles	Second round	-
1950	Men's Doubles	Winner	Geoff Trapnell
1950	Mixed Doubles	Semi final	V. Gillespie
1951	Men's singles	Runner Up	-
1954	Men's singles	Winner	-
1955	Men's singles	Runner Up	-
1955	Men's doubles	Runner Up	Desmond Lacey
1956	Men's singles	Winner	-
1956	Men's doubles	Winner	Desmond Lacey
1956	Mixed doubles	Runner Up	D. Kilbride
1957	Men's singles	Winner	-
1957	Men's doubles	Winner	Desmond Lacey
1957	Mixed doubles	Winner	Mary O'Sullivan
1958	Mixed doubles	Winner	Mary O'Sullivan
1959	Men's singles	Winner	-
1965	Mixed doubles	Winner	Yvonne Kelly
1966	Men's doubles	Winner	Robert Harris

==== Leinster Open ====
Year	Event	Result	Partner
1955	Men's singles	Winner	-
1955	Men's doubles	Semi final	Desmond Lacey
1955	Mixed doubles	Semi final	D. Kilbride

=== Appearances in other competitions ===
Year	Competition	Event	Result	Partner
1952	All England Badminton Championships	Men's singles	Round of 32	-
1955	All England Badminton Championships	Men's singles	Round of 32	-
1955	Scottish Open	Men's singles	Winner	-
1955	Welsh International	Men's singles	Winner	-
1955	Welsh International	Men's doubles	Winner	Desmond Lacey
1956	Irish Open	Men's singles	Winner	-
1959	Scottish Open	Men's singles	Runner Up	-
1960	All England Badminton Championships	Men's singles	Round of 32	-
1960	Irish Open	Men's singles	Semi final	-
1961	Scottish Open	Men's singles	Third round	-
1962	Irish Open	Men's singles	Quarter final	-
1964	Irish Open	Men's singles	Second round	-
1964	Irish Open	Men's doubles	First round	D.W. McCullough
