= Tan Jin Eong =

Malaysian badminton player (1927–2014)

Tan Jin Eong 陈仁勇
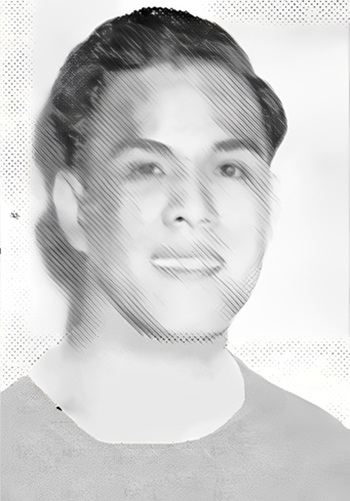

Personal information
- Born: 1927 Ipoh, Perak, Malaya
- Died: 2 November 2014 (aged 86–87) Ipoh, Perak, Malaysia

Sport
- Country: Malaysia
- Sport: Badminton
Medal record
Men's badminton
Representing Malaya
Thomas Cup
Gold medal – first place	1955 Singapore	Team

Tan Jin Eong (simplified Chinese: 陈仁勇; traditional Chinese: 陳仁勇; pinyin: Chén Rényǒng; born 1927; died 2 November 2014) was a Malaysian badminton player from Ipoh, Perak.

== Early life ==
Tan was born in Ipoh, Perak, Malaya. He was the son of badminton star Tan Cheng Phor. His sister, Tan Eng Looi, was a badminton player as well.

== Career ==
Tan was part of the Malayan team that won the 1955 Thomas Cup. He partnered Lim Kee Fong in the doubles. In the final against Denmark, they played against Ole Mertz and Ove Eilertsen in the first doubles and won it in straight sets (15–9, 15–3). In the second doubles, they faced Finn Kobberø and Jørgen Hammergaard Hansen but lost to them in a hard fought three setter (13–18, 15–4, 6–15). It turned out to be the only victory for the Danes as Malaya won the cup with the scoreline of 8:1.

In his native Perak, Tan won numerous national titles. In 1949, he won in all three disciplines (singles, doubles and mixed doubles).

== Achievements ==
=== International tournaments ===
Men's doubles

Year	Tournament	Partner	Opponent	Score	Result	Ref
1951	Malaysia Open	(Malaysia) Lee Fan Leong	(Malaysia) Abdullah Piruz (Malaysia) Chan Kon Leong	15–18, 15–1, 11–15	(silver) Runner-up	

Mixed doubles

Year	Tournament	Partner	Opponent	Score	Result	Ref
1954	Malaysia Open	(Malaysia) Tan Eng Looi	(Malaysia) Chan Kon Leong (Malaysia) Cecillia Samuel	10–15, 15–10, 16–18	(silver) Runner-up	

== Personal life ==
Tan was married to Mary Ooi Siew Khim.

== Death ==
Tan died on 2 November 2014, aged 87, at Kinta Medical Centre in Ipoh due to kidney failure.
