= Scott Huey =

Cricket information
- Batting: Right-handed
- Bowling: Left-arm orthodox spin

International information
- National side: Ireland

Career statistics
Competition	First-class
Matches	20
Runs scored	134
Batting average	5.15
100s/50s	0/0
Top score	23*
Balls bowled	3,534
Wickets	66
Bowling average	18.22
5 wickets in innings	5
10 wickets in match	1
Best bowling	8/48
Catches/stumpings	14/–
- Source: Cricket Archive, 16 November 2022

Samuel Scott Johnston Huey, usually known as Scott Huey (21 December 1923 – 8 March 2012) was an Irish cricketer. A right-handed batsman and left-arm orthodox spin bowler, he played 36 times for the Ireland cricket team between 1951 and 1966 including twenty first-class matches. He is notable for being the last bowler to dismiss Sir Len Hutton in first-class cricket. He also represented Ireland at badminton. He was born in County Donegal.

== Playing career ==
Huey made his debut for Ireland in June 1951, playing against Scotland in a first-class match. He played once more for Ireland that year, against the MCC at Lord's. In 1952 he played twice against India and against Scotland and the MCC. He did not play in 1953, returning to the Irish side in September 1954 for what would be his finest performance for them. He made both his highest score and took his best bowling figures in the match against the MCC, scoring 23 not out in the Irish first innings and taking 8/48 in the MCC second innings. He took 14/97 overall in the match, the best bowling figures in all cricket for Ireland.

That performance led to him becoming much more of a regular in the Irish side, playing 29 further times for them over the following twelve years, including internationals against Australia, New Zealand, Scotland and the West Indies. He also played several matches against various English county sides and the MCC. His last game for Ireland was in September 1966 against the MCC.

== Statistics ==
In all matches for Ireland, Huey scored 218 runs at an average of 5.59. He took 112 wickets at an average of 20.66. He took five wickets in an innings seven times and ten in a match once. He took 22 catches. In first-class cricket, he scored 134 runs at an average of 5.15 and took 66 wickets at an average of 18.22. He took five wickets in an innings five times and ten in a match once. He took 14 catches.

== Family ==
His nephew Graham Henderson also played badminton at international level for Ireland.
