= 1955 Thomas Cup =

Tournament details
- Dates: 24 May – 5 June 1955
- Edition: 3rd
- Level: International
- Nations: 5
- Venue: Singapore Badminton Stadium
- Location: Singapore

The 1955 Thomas Cup competition is an international team tournament for supremacy in men's badminton (its female counterpart is the Uber Cup). Beginning in 1948–49, it was held every three years until 1982 and has been held every two years thereafter. Twenty-one national teams officially entered the third Thomas Cup series in 1954-1955 but two of these, Belgium and Burma, defaulted their opening ties (team matches). Four qualifying zones were established: Asia, Australasia, Europe and Pan America. Winners from each zone played-off in Singapore in late May and early June for the right to play Malaya which, as defending champion, was exempt until it met a challenger in a conclusive challenge round tie. For a more detailed description of the Thomas Cup format see Wikipedia's general article on the Thomas Cup.

== Qualification ==
Means of qualification	Date	Venue	Slot	Qualified teams
1952 Thomas Cup	24 May – 1 June 1952	Singapore	1	Malaya
Asian Zone	27 June 1954 – 9 April 1955	Bangkok; Bombay; Colombo; Hong Kong; Karachi	1	India
American Zone	12 – 13 March 1955	Winnipeg	1	United States
European Zone	14 November 1954 – 3 April 1955	Bonn; Cardiff; Dublin; Dunfermline; Le Havre; Malmö; Stoke-on-Trent	1	Denmark
Australasian Zone	5 – 6 May 1955	Melbourne	1	Australia
Total			5	

As it had in the 1951-1952 series, India won the Asian zone, its toughest competition coming in its opening contest against an improving Thailand 6–3 . In Europe Denmark, now boasting nineteen-year-old prodigy Finn Kobbero, beat three opponents with the loss of only one individual match. In the Pan American zone the USA lost 4 of 5 singles matches to Canada but won the tie by sweeping the doubles. In the Australasian zone J. E. Robson's singles victories were not enough to keep his New Zealand team from falling to Australia 2–7.

== Knockout stage ==
The following teams, shown by region, qualified for the 1955 Thomas Cup. Defending champion and host Malaya automatically qualified to defend the title it had won three years previously.

=== Bracket ===
First round
Malaya
Bye
24 May 1955 – Singapore
United States	3
India	6
27 May 1955 – Singapore
Australia	0
Denmark	9

Second round
Malaya
Bye
31 May 1955 – Singapore
India	3
Denmark	6

Challenge round
4 June 1955 – Singapore
Malaya	8
Denmark	1

=== First round ===
24 May 1955
25 May 1952

United States	3–6	India
Report

Singapore Badminton Stadium, Singapore

27 May 1955
28 May 1955

Denmark	9–0	Australia
Report

Singapore Badminton Stadium, Singapore

=== Second round ===
31 May 1955
1 June 1955

Denmark	6–3	India
Report

Singapore Badminton Stadium, Singapore

=== Final ===
4 June 1955
5 June 1955

Malaya	8–1	Denmark
Report

Singapore Badminton Stadium, Singapore

1955 Thomas Cup winner

Malaya
Third title
