= Colin Hyde Maidment =

Irish badminton player and official

Colin Maidment
- Maidment in 1936

Personal information
- Born: Colin Hyde Maidment; 29 May 1908, Dublin, Ireland
- Died: 9 May 1955 (aged 46), Dublin, Ireland

Sport
- Country: Ireland
- Sport: Badminton

Colin Hyde Maidment (1908–1955) was an Irish badminton player, national men's doubles and mixed champion in the 1930s, sporting administrator, and honorary secretary of the Badminton Union of Ireland.

== Early and personal life ==
Colin Hyde Maidment was born on 29 May 1908 to Everett Edwin Maidment, a commercial traveller, and Harriet Isabel Maidment (née Hyde). In 1943, he married Barbara B. Cresswell in St Patrick's Church of Ireland, Dalkey, with whom he had three children. Maidment's only son, Colin John Hyde Maidment, a student of Trinity College Dublin, died in an accident in 1970 at the age of 21, with his motorcycle being found by the Cliffs of Moher.

A solicitor by profession, Maidmont was a partner in the Dublin legal firm of Messrs Longfield, Jameson and Hamilton at the time of his death in 1955.

== Sporting career ==
Throughout his life, Maidment was active across a number of different sporting activities including lawn tennis, badminton, and Cricket. In the late 1920s and early 1930s, he was reported as competing in club tennis in the Dublin region.

By 1931, Maidment was playing for the Midland branch interprovincial badminton team. 1933 saw Maidment win the mixed doubles with Norma Stoker in the Midland branch junior tournament for the second year in a row, as well as winning the men's singles for a second time. In 1935, Maidment achieved his first senior national badminton title, winning the men's doubles of the Irish National Badminton Championships with E.L. Warren. In the subsequent year Maidment won his second senior national title in the mixed doubles with Norma Stoker.

Maidment continued playing league badminton until 1954 and competed in the mixed doubles of the Midland branch tournament a month before his death in 1955.

== Administrative roles and death ==
Maidment was actively involved in the administration side of Irish badminton by 1942, when he was noted as being elected honorary secretary of the Midland branch. As part of the Knights badminton club committee in 1946, along with Frank Peard, Geoff Trapnell and others, they set up a practice club to improve the standard of play among the better badminton players in Dublin, as this cohort of players was felt to only meet opponents of the same standard in tournaments. This concept was similar to the Strollers badminton club established in Ulster by Major John McCallum. 1946 also saw Maidment step down as honorary secretary of the Midland branch, so that he could focus more attention of national Badminton Union of Ireland business. His contribution to the branch was recognised in 1947 when he was elected an honorary vice-president. In 1949 year he represented the Badminton Union of Ireland alongside Geoff Trapnell at a meeting seeking to form an Irish sporting federation. During the early 1950s, Maidment was a member of the management committee that strove to build a dedicated new badminton hall in Dublin. Working with Peard, Trapnell, and others, this resulted in the opening of a four court badminton hall at Whitehall Road, Terenure in 1954.

Maidment's commitment extended beyond badminton also, and he was involved in tennis administration also.

Maidment died in May 1955, aged 46, from coronary thrombosis. At the time of his death, he was serving honorary secretary of the Badminton Union of Ireland and honorary president of the Midland branch. His wife Barbara died in 1974.
