= Frank Peard =

Irish badminton player (1919–2019)

Personal information
- Born: Francis Woodley Peard; 5 October 1919
- Died: 22 September 2019 (aged 99) Mount Hybla Nursing Home, Dublin

Sport
- Sport: Badminton

Frank Peard (1919 - 2019) was an Irish badminton player who played for Ireland internationally in the 1940s and 1950s.

== Early life and family ==
Francis Woodley Peard was born in 1919 in Skibbereen, Co Cork to Francis Woodley Peard, a bank official, and his wife Dorothy Phyllis (née Clarke). Having lived in Mountmellick, County Laois, Peard's family moved to Listowel, County Kerry in 1932. Peard attended St Michael's secondary school in Listowel.

He married fellow badminton player, Susan Devlin, in 1960. They had two children, Mark and Pam.

== Badminton career ==
Peard began playing badminton at around age 9 or 10. He joined the Ailesbury Badminton Club in the early 1940s, where he partnered with Ham Lambert and Mrs Eileen Goulding. Along with Raymund Egan, Dick Bell, Colin Maidment and Geoff Trapnell, Peard was a co-founder of The Knights Badminton Club in 1946. Peard cited his study of David Guthrie Freeman's singles games as greatly improving his own game in the late 1940s. His playing style was latterly described as consistent and thoughtful, and that he possessed very quick reflexes and was skilled across singles, doubles and mixed.

Between 1946 and 1957, Peard represented Ireland in badminton twenty times. He won 3 Irish Open titles, 16 Irish Close titles, and 6 Scottish titles. Additionally, he played in two All England semi-finals, playing alongside Noel Radford and Jim Fitzgibbon. He played at European badminton tournaments with Fitzgibbon. In 1948 he played in the first match of the inaugural Thomas Cup, playing against Denmark.

He was a keen promoter of badminton in Ireland, taking part and organising many exhibition events. Peard had a long coaching career, and was invited to speak at the 1985 World Coaching Conference in Calgary. He served on the executive committee of the Leinster Branch, overseeing the move of the branch to new premises at the Terenure Centre, Whitehall Road in 1954.

In 1976, Peard served as the Director of the European Championships when they came to Dublin that year. He was also involved in the establishment of the Badminton Museum of Ireland, donating funds and objects to the museum.

== Guinness career and later life ==
Outside of badminton, Peard worked for Guinness in Dublin from 1939 until his retirement in 1981. He initially worked Accountant's Department. He spent 18 months in the United States studying, and during this time he wrote for The Irish Times and the Irish Management Institute on business matters. One such article for The Irish Times entitled "How to Get There: An Emigrant's to New York" was a guide to new Irish arrivals to the city. After his return to Dublin he became Assistant Chief Accountant, later Director of Guinness in 1972, and finally in 1977 he became Deputy Managing Director of Guinness Ireland. He became a Trustee of the Iveagh Trust in 1981. In 1993 he became the first non-member of the Guinness family to serve as Chairman of the Trust.

Peard died at Mount Hybla Nursing Home, Dublin on 22 September 2019.

== Publications ==
Peard wrote a number of publications on the history of badminton:

- Sixty Years of Irish Badminton (1995)
- A Century of Irish Badminton: A supplement to Sixty Years of Irish Badminton (2004)
- Building the Badminton Hall (1954)
- The Midland Branch (1961)
- Reorganisation of the B.U.I. (1966)
- A Policy and its Implementation (1966)
- M.B.B.U.I. (1967)
- Badminton in Holland (1969)
- Improving the Performance of Irish Badminton Teams (1970)
- Conditions for Progress (1976)

== Achievements ==
Below are a selection of Peard's on court achievements.

=== Irish National Badminton Championships ===
Year	Tournament	Event	Result	Partner
1949	Irish National Badminton Championships	Men's singles	Runner-up	-
1949	Irish National Badminton Championships	Men's doubles	Winner	James Fitzgibbon
1950	Irish National Badminton Championships	Men's singles	Winner	-
1950	Irish National Badminton Championships	Men's doubles	Winner	James Fitzgibbon
1950	Irish National Badminton Championships	Mixed doubles	Winner	B. I. Donaldson
1951	Irish National Badminton Championships	Men's singles	Winner	-
1951	Irish National Badminton Championships	Men's doubles	Winner	James Fitzgibbon
1951	Irish National Badminton Championships	Mixed doubles	Winner	B. I. Donaldson
1952	Irish National Badminton Championships	Men's singles	Winner	-
1952	Irish National Badminton Championships	Men's doubles	Winner	James Fitzgibbon
1952	Irish National Badminton Championships	Mixed doubles	Winner	B. I. Donaldson
1953	Irish National Badminton Championships	Men's singles	Winner	-
1953	Irish National Badminton Championships	Men's doubles	Winner	James Fitzgibbon
1953	Irish National Badminton Championships	Mixed doubles	Winner	B. I. Donaldson
1954	Irish National Badminton Championships	Men's singles	Runner-up	-
1954	Irish National Badminton Championships	Men's doubles	Winner	James Fitzgibbon
1955	Irish National Badminton Championships	Men's singles	Runner-up	-
1955	Irish National Badminton Championships	Men's doubles	Winner	James Fitzgibbon
1955	Irish National Badminton Championships	Mixed doubles	Winner	B. I. Donaldson
1957	Irish National Badminton Championships	Men's singles	Runner-up	-
1961	Irish National Badminton Championships	Men's doubles	Winner	James Fitzgibbon
1962	Irish National Badminton Championships	Men's doubles	Winner	James Fitzgibbon

=== All England Badminton Championships ===
Year	Tournament	Event	Result	Partner
1948	All England Badminton Championships	Men's singles	Second Round	-
1949	All England Badminton Championships	Men's singles	Third Round	-
1951	All England Badminton Championships	Men's singles	Round of 16	-
1952	All England Badminton Championships	Men's singles	Quarterfinals	-
1952	All England Badminton Championships	Men's doubles	Semifinals	James Fitzgibbon
1954	All England Badminton Championships	Men's singles	Round of 16	-

=== International & Open Tournaments ===
Year	Tournament	Event	Result	Partner
1948	Scottish Open	Men's doubles	Winner	T. L. Henry
1948	Irish Open	Men's doubles	Winner	Noel Radford
1949	Scottish Open	Men's doubles	Winner	T. L. Henry
1949	Scottish Open	Men's singles	Winner	-
1950	North of England Championships	Men's singles	Winner	-
1950	Irish Open	Men's singles	Winner	-
1950	Scottish Open	Men's singles	Winner	-
1950	Irish Open	Men's doubles	Winner	James Fitzgibbon
1951	Scottish Open	Men's singles	Winner	-
1951	Scottish Open	Men's doubles	Winner	James Fitzgibbon
1954	Irish Open	Men's doubles	Winner	James Fitzgibbon
