= Geoff Trapnell =

Irish badminton player and official

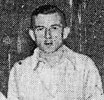
- Trapnell in 1936

Personal information
- Born: Arthur Geoffrey Trapnell; January 1911, Harrow, England
- Died: 24 January 2000 (aged 89), Dalkey, Co Dublin, Ireland

Sport
- Country: Ireland
- Sport: Badminton

Arthur Geoffrey Trapnell (1911–2000) was an Irish badminton player, national men's singles champion, sporting administrator, and president of the Badminton Union of Ireland.

== Early and personal life ==
Arthur Geoffrey Trapnell was the youngest son of Arthur Lumsden Trapnell, a cabinet maker from London and Grace Webb. In 1937 he married Eileen Carty, with whom he had two children. Trapnell was a chartered accountant and for many years was the chief accountant of the Dublin Gas Company.

== Sporting career ==
Trapnell's name first appeared in newspaper sports reports in 1928 and 1929, when he was listed as one of the Dublin accountants playing cricket against a team of Belfast accountants and playing hockey for Pembroke Wanderers. It was badminton however that Trapnell had the longest involvement in and where he left a lasting impression.

By 1930, Trapnell was playing in Midland branch tournaments. By 1934 he was representing the Midland branch in interprovincial matches and competing in national tournaments. In December 1936, Trapnell won his only national title when he overcame L. Green in three sets to win the men's singles in the Irish National Badminton Championships. 1937 saw Trapnell being selected for the first time as a member of the Ireland national badminton team as a substitute in a match against Wales.

By 1942, Trapnell was playing badminton at club level at the Gas Company Club. According to Frank Peard, it was Trapnell who identified the potential of a young James 'Chick' Doyle at the Gas Company Club.

Trapnell continued to play badminton at Midland branch tournaments into the late 1940s and was still playing club badminton as late as 1958.

== Administrative roles and later life ==
Trapnell was active on the administrative side of Irish badminton from the late 1940s. In 1949, Trapnell was re-elected as honorary treasurer of the Badminton Union of Ireland and in that same year he represented the Badminton Union of Ireland alongside C.H. Maidment at a meeting seeking to form an Irish sporting federation. In 1955 he was listed among the members of the Midland Branch's General Purpose Committee. In 1959 Trapnell was elected honorary secretary of the Badminton Union of Ireland, a position which he retained until 1974. During his tenure, he also represented Ireland at International Badminton Federation meetings. He was elected president of the organisation in 1974, stepping down in 1976, having completed forty-five years of service to Irish badminton. In 1977 he was awarded an honorary life membership of the Badminton Union of Ireland, and the International Badminton Federation recognised his long service to the sport by bestowing a Meritorious Service Award on him in 1986. Trapnell died in 2000, having been pre-deceased by his wife.
