= Desmond Lacey =

Irish badminton (1917–1991)

Personal information
- Born: John Kenneth Desmond Lacey; 4 October 1917 Dublin, Ireland
- Died: 3 February 1991 (aged 73) Putney, London, England

Sport
- Country: Ireland
- Sport: Badminton

John Kenneth Desmond Lacey (4 October 1917 — 3 February 1991) was an Irish badminton player. In 1955 he won double honours at the Irish National Badminton Championships, winning the men's double with James 'Chick' Doyle and the mixed doubles with Jean Lawless, having previously been runner up in the men's doubles with Doyle in the 1951, 1953, 1954, 1956 and 1957 tournaments.

== Biography ==
John Kenneth Desmond Lacey was born in Dublin in October 1917 to Frederick Lacey, a manager, and his wife Helen (née Long).

A long time doubles partner of Chick Doyle, Lacey also represented Leinster and Ireland in badminton. In 1949, he was noted as a newcomer to the Dublin badminton team to play Belfast, having previously played in Lancashire, England.

Lacey joined Imperial Chemical Industries in 1934. He joined their Irish operation in 1949, rising to become chemicals director in 1979 and serving on the board of the company.
