= Nora Conway =

Irish badminton player

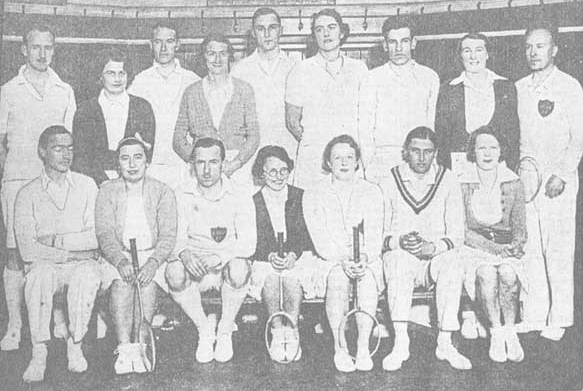

Personal information
- Born: Nora M. Conway c. 1920
- Died: c. 2010

Sport
- Country: Ireland
- Sport: Badminton

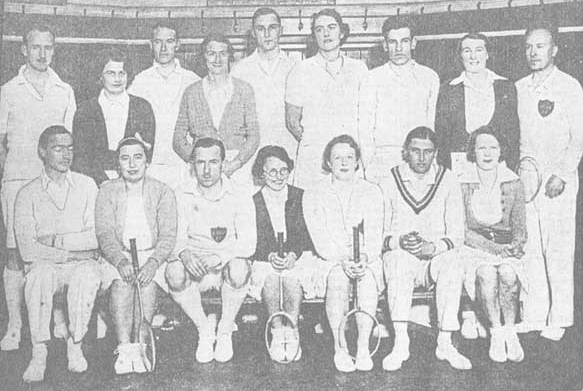
Irish Badminton Teams, 1939 Leinster and Munster Interprovincial Teams: Back Row: N. H. Lambert (L) Miss Barbara J. Good (L) T. Williams (M) Mrs. Hendricks (M) D.Hosford (M) Miss Norma Stoker (L) L. Johnston (M) Miss Seymour (M) J. S. Wilson (L), Front Row: F. C. South (M) Miss Nora Conway (L) A. G. Trapnell (L) Mrs. Coughlan (M) Miss G. Carty (L) C. H. Maidment (L) Mrs. Wallace (M)

Nora Conway (c. 1920 - c. 2010) was an Irish badminton player.

== Biography ==
Nora Conway first won the national title in Ireland in 1948. Four more titles followed until 1952. In 1948 and 1950 she won the Irish Open.

== Achievements ==
Year	Tournament	Event	Winner
1948	Irish Open	Women's doubles	Nora Conway / Barbara J. Good
1948	Irish National Badminton Championships	Women's doubles	Nora Conway / Barbara J. Good
1949	Irish National Badminton Championships	Women's doubles	Nora Conway / Barbara J. Good
1950	Irish Open	Women's doubles	Nora Conway / B. Potter
1950	Irish National Badminton Championships	Women's doubles	Nora Conway / Barbara J. Good
1951	Irish National Badminton Championships	Women's doubles	Nora Conway / Barbara J. Good
1952	Irish National Badminton Championships	Women's doubles	Nora Conway / Barbara J. Good
