= Jean Lawless =

Irish badminton player

Personal information
- Born: c. 1930

Sport
- Country: Ireland
- Sport: Badminton

Jean Lawless (born c. 1930) is an Irish badminton player.

== Biography ==
Jean Lawless first became national champion in Ireland in 1952. Five more titles followed until 1958. In 1952 she won the women's doubles and women's singles at the Irish Open. Her married name is Jean Sharkey.

== Achievements ==
| Year | Tournament | Event | Winner |
|---|---|---|---|
| 1952 | Irish Open | Women's doubles | Jean Lawless / Barbara Good |
| 1952 | Irish Open | Women's singles | Jean Lawless |
| 1952 | Irish National Badminton Championships | Women's singles | Jean Lawless |
| 1953 | Irish National Badminton Championships | Women's doubles | B. I. Donaldson / Jean Lawless |
| 1955 | Irish National Badminton Championships | Women's doubles | B. I. Donaldson / Jean Lawless |
| 1956 | Irish National Badminton Championships | Mixed | Desmond Lacey / Jean Lawless |
| 1956 | Irish National Badminton Championships | Women's doubles | B. I. Donaldson / Jean Lawless |
| 1958 | Irish National Badminton Championships | Mixed | George Henderson / Jean Sharkey |
