= Barbara J. Good =

Irish badminton player

- Good in 1939

Personal information
- Born: c. 1920

Sport
- Country: Ireland
- Sport: Badminton

Barbara J. Good (born c. 1920) was an Irish badminton player.

== Biography ==
Barbara J. Good was the daughter of badminton players Dr T. D. Good and Ada Good. Two of her siblings also played badminton at national and international level, Derreen and Norman. Good won her first national titles in Ireland in 1948. By 1954, she had been successful nine times. In 1952 she won the Irish Open. She played in mixed doubles with Jim FitzGibbon, and went on numerous badminton tournament tours with FitzGibbon, Dorothy Donaldson, and Frank Peard.

== Achievements ==
Year	Tournament	Event	Winner
1948	Irish National Badminton Championships	Women's singles	Barbara J. Good
1948	Irish National Badminton Championships	Women's doubles	Nora Conway / Barbara J. Good
1949	Irish National Badminton Championships	Mixed	Jim Fitzgibbon / Barbara J. Good
1949	Irish National Badminton Championships	Women's singles	Barbara J. Good
1949	Irish National Badminton Championships	Women's doubles	Nora Conway / Barbara J. Good
1950	Irish National Badminton Championships	Women's doubles	Nora Conway / Barbara J. Good
1951	Irish National Badminton Championships	Women's doubles	Nora Conway / Barbara J. Good
1952	Irish Open	Women's doubles	Jean Lawless / Barbara J. Good
1952	Irish National Badminton Championships	Women's doubles	Nora Conway / Barbara J. Good
1954	Irish National Badminton Championships	Mixed	Jim FitzGibbon / Barbara J. Good
