= J.J. Fitzgibbon (badminton) =

Irish badminton and tennis player (1920–1994)

Personal information
- Born: James Joseph Fitzgibbon; 16 April 1920, Waterford, Ireland
- Died: 22 May 1994 (aged 74), Dublin, Ireland

Sport
- Country: Ireland
- Sport: Badminton

J.J. (Jim) Fitzgibbon was an Irish badminton player, tennis player and businessman. With Frank Peard he won nine Irish National Badminton Championships titles in men's doubles between 1948 and 1961, as well as a men's singles title and two mixed doubles titles. He later opened a sports shop in South Anne Street, Dublin.

== Early life ==
James Joseph Fitzgibbon was born in Waterford in April 1920 to David Fitzgibbon, a draper's shop assistant, and his wife Mary (née Martin). He was the youngest of four children. In 1947, he married Mary Nichols.

== Sporting career ==
Fitzgibbon achieved recognition in Badminton circles through his strong doubles performances with Frank Peard. This led them to dominating the Irish men's doubles titles for most of the 1950's and they enjoyed a resurgence in the early 1960's. Though not as successful in singles and mixed doubles, he won a singles title in 1948 and two mixed titles with Barbara J. Good in 1948 and 1953.

Fitzgibbon, again partnering with Peard, reached the semifinals of the Men's doubles at the 1952 All England Badminton Championships. He also competed in the men's singles in 1951 and 1952, exiting in the first round both times.

For many years, he was the non playing captain of Ireland's Davis Cup team.

== Later life ==
In 1984, RTÉ news reported that Fitzgibbon's sports shop in Dublin was selling imported hacky sacks, then the latest craze. Fitzgibbon was a close friend of George Redmond.

Fitzgibbon was a member of the All England club, a member of Fitzwilliam Lawn Tennis Club and remained active playing veterans tennis in his later years. He died in St Vincent's Hospital, Dublin in May 1994, and was survived by his wife Mary, his son Ken (who was an Irish Junior Tennis Champion) and his brother Pat.
