= Open (sport) =

Competition with unrestricted entry

In sports, an open tournament, or open competition, indicates anyone may enter the tournament or competition, especially without regard to their professional or amateur status. First used in golf, the term is now used in many different sports and in varying contexts, not always in reference to the amateur or professional status of the players. For example, it might indicate that the competition is "open" to international players. An open competition contrasts with closed and invitational competitions.

The term "open" is not always absolute. Minimum performance standards, or eligibility criteria, vary by sport and by individual tournament rules. For example, qualifier entrants to the 2025 U.S. Open golf tournament were required to have a USGA official handicap of 0.4 or less. Open competitions are also found outside of sports, such as open architectural design competitions.

== History ==
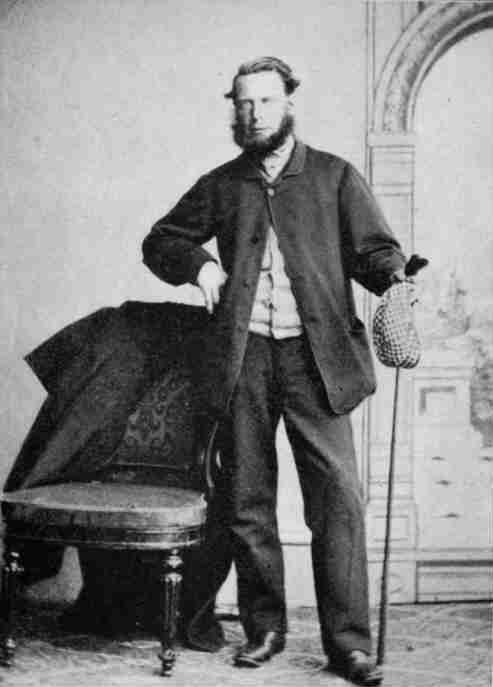
Old Tom Morris, winner of the first open Challenge Belt golf tournament, the 1861 Open Championship.

The earliest known usage of the term was by Prestwick Golf Club in 1861, when it held the second annual Challenge Belt golf competition, now referred to as The Open Championship or British Open. The first championship at Prestwick was held in 1860, but for professional golfers only. In 1861 they opened their medal competition to both professionals and amateurs. The first open Challenge Belt was won by Old Tom Morris (Thomas Mitchell Morris). The best amateur finisher that year was James Ogilvie Fairlie, who placed eighth.

The Open Era of tennis began in 1968 when both amateur and professional players were allowed to compete in Grand Slam events. Prior to that only amateur players were officially allowed to participate.

The International Olympic Committee restricted the original 1896 Olympic Games to male amateur competitors only. In 1986 the IOC allowed the respective international federations of each sport to determine whether professional athletes would be eligible to compete. This officially opened the Olympic Games to both amateur and professional athletes. Women were first allowed to compete in the Olympics at the 1900 Games when select sports, such as tennis, were opened to women competitors. Today, some sports, such as Greco-Roman wrestling, are still closed to female competitors. Other sports, such as Rhythmic gymnastics, are closed to male competitors.

In 2022 the international World Aquatics federation voted to prohibit transgender athletes from participating in women's elite competitions, but in 2023 World Aquatics created an open category of competition for athletes whose gender identity is different than their birth sex. This self-described "pioneering pilot project" was to be held for the first time at the 2023 Swimming World Cup in Berlin, but was cancelled due to lack of entries. World Aquatics intends to include the category in future events.

== Related terms ==
Closed: Closed tournaments or competitions restrict participation to certain groups. For example, players might be restricted to male or female athletes, must be from a specific school or grade level, be members of a specific club, or live in a specific country.

Invitational: Invitational tournaments and competitions are also considered closed competitions, but further restrict participants to individuals or teams who are specifically invited to compete.

Qualifier: Many open tournaments include preliminary qualifying events, sometimes called qualies, that successively reduce the field prior to a final championship event, which itself may involve elimination rounds. The term qualifier may refer to the qualifying events or rounds, or to the players who successfully earn their way through the qualifying rounds to compete in the championship rounds. Top ranked players may be allowed to bypass the qualifying events, be given a bye, and directly seeded into the championship event.

== See also ==
- Open golf tournament
- Open Era of tennis
- The Open Championship, the British Open golf tournament
- Prestwick Golf Club, originator of The Open Championship
