= Dorothy Donaldson =

- Born: Dorothy Cunningham Brown; 1915; Waterford, Ireland
- Died: 4 September 2011 (aged 95–96); Dublin, Ireland
- Education: Newtown School, Waterford; Scarborough College
- Occupation: Sportswoman
- Years active: 1928–1999

Dorothy Cunningham Donaldson (née Brown) (1915 – 4 September 2011) was an Irish sportswoman who was most prominent in the hockey, badminton and golf circles where she won a plethora of competitions during her 71-year playing career. She played for the Ireland women's national field hockey team between 1941 and 1947 except for the 1942 season. Donaldson was additionally a women's singles and mixed doubles champion in the Irish National Badminton Championships and until 1957 played for the Irish international team.

== Early life and career ==
She was born Dorothy Cunningham Brown in 1915 in the city of Waterford. Donaldson was educated at Newtown School, Waterford where her sporting skills were first noted in hockey, badminton, swimming and gymnastics. Her hockey career started in 1928 when the Munster Junior team selected her to play as a goaltender. Donaldson joined the Munster Senior team two years later and remained in the same position for the next seven years. She reached the finals of the 1931 Munster Badminton Championship, finishing as runner-up, but won the title the following year. Donaldson successfully defended the title and partnered with her brother Joe Brown, clinched the mixed doubles title. She once again won the singles title in 1934 and reclaimed the mixed doubles title with Fred South.

Donaldson went to the Scarborough College, Yorkshire in 1936 to study physical education (PE). She served as part of the Waterford county golf team that same year and reached the semi-finals of the Midland Trophy.where they lost to Kilkenny county. After earning her qualification a year later, Donaldson was appointed PE teacher at Oaklands Girls’ School and joined the local hockey club where she was chosen to be on the women's first team. She also played for the Yorkshire County Women's team against Lancashire and greatly impressed the English selectors in her game to the point where they invited her to trial for the England women's hockey team. However, since Donaldson was an Irish citizen, she had to decline the invitation.

Upon returning to Ireland in 1938, she regained her former position on the Munster Senior team. Donaldson was also the captain of the South East Ireland team in 1939, playing as a centre half. She married banker and fellow keen sportsman Basil Donaldson in 1941. The couple moved to Dublin and she joined the Pembroke Wanderers Hockey Club. In 1941, Donaldson received full international honours and continued to play for the Ireland national team until 1947. The sole exception was the 1942 season when she took a year off because of the birth of her son. After her second son was born, Donaldson announced her retirement from representative hockey.

== Later career and death ==
She returned to competitive badminton in 1949. Donaldson later took the Irish women's singles championship and mixed doubles title with the number one rated player in Ireland at the time, Frank Peard. She was chosen to play for the Irish international team against Scotland and kept her place until 1957. Throughout this period, Donaldson was a competitive player for the Ailesbury Badminton Club. The club displayed its appreciation of Donaldson by appointing her an honorary life member. In the late 1950s she began playing golf again by becoming a member of the Grange Golf Club, Dublin and had a small handicap in a short period of time.

Showing her keenness. Donaldson soon joined the Grange Golf Club team and competed in the Irish Women's Senior Club. She was involved in several of the club's memorable matches and won a plethora of club competitions. One such event was securing the Grange Golf Club President's Prize in June 1993 with a net score of 67. The club elected Donaldson an honorary associate member in 1997. She ended her playing career in 1999 when her husband became ill and devoted her time to caring for him at home. Basil died in 2001. She died at the Kiltipper Woods Care Centre in Dublin at 1:30 pm on 4 September 2011. Donaldson was survived by her two sons, four grandchildren, and two great-grandchildren.
