= 2001 Irish National Badminton Championships =

Tournament details
- Dates: 3 February 2001– 5 February 2001
- Venue: Baldoyle Badminton Centre
- Location: Dublin, Ireland

The 2001 Irish National Badminton Championships was a national closed badminton tournament held in Baldoyle Badminton Centre, Dublin, Ireland from 3 to 4 February 2001.

== Final results ==
Category	Winners	Runners-up	Score
Men's singles	Bruce Topping	Ciaran D'arcy	15 - 04; 15 - 07
Women's singles	Claire Henderson	Keelin Fox	08 - 11; 11 - 08; 11 - 03
Men's doubles	Bruce Topping; Mark Topping	Eugene McKenna; Graham Henderson	15 - 07; 13 - 15; 15 - 11
Women's doubles	Sian Williams; Keelin Fox	Fiona Glennon; Pauline Glennon	15 - 06; 15 - 03
Mixed doubles	Bruce Topping; Jayne Plunkett	David Hogan; Keelin Fox	15 - 12; 15 - 12

== Men's singles ==
Below are the final rounds as reported in the Irish Times:

Semifinals
Bruce Topping	15	15
Niall Tierney	10	5
Ciaran D'arcy	15	3	15
Nigel Boyne	8	15	11

Finals
Bruce Topping	15	15
Ciaran D'arcy	4	7

== Women's singles ==
Below are the final rounds as reported in the Irish Times:

Semifinals
Claire Henderson	11	6	11
Caitriona Farrell	0	11	5
Keelin Fox	11	11
Jennifer Dunne	7	9

Finals
Claire Henderson	8	11	11
Keelin Fox	11	8	3

== Men's doubles ==
Below are the final rounds as reported in the Irish Times:

Semifinals
Bruce Topping; Mark Topping	15	14	15
Donal O'Halloran; David Hogan	11	15	12
Eugene McKenna; Graham Henderson	15	15
Ciaran D'arcy; N. Lynch	5	4

Finals
Bruce Topping; Mark Topping	15	13	15
Eugene McKenna; Graham Henderson	7	15	11

== Women's doubles ==
Below are the final rounds as reported in the Irish Times:

Semifinals
Sian Williams; Keelin Fox	15	15
Ruth Kilkenny; Caitriona Farrell	6	5
Fiona Glennon; Pauline Glennon	15	15
Claire Henderson; Dona Scott	5	10

Finals
Sian Williams; Keelin Fox	15	15
Fiona Glennon; Pauline Glennon	6	3
