= 1981 Helvetia Cup =

Badminton event

1981 Helvetia Cup Helvetia Cup 1981
Tournament details
- Dates: 22 – 24 January
- Edition: 15
- Venue: Jotunhallen; Hjertnes Hall
- Location: Sandefjord, Norway

The 1981 Helvetia Cup was the fifteenth edition of the Helvetia Cup mixed team badminton tournament. In 1979, Norway won the rights to host the tournament after the finals of the 1979 Helvetia Cup.

Ireland created history when the team won their first title in the tournament, beating the hosts and Wales in the final round. Poland achieved a new high by finishing in fourth place, defeating Austria and Finland in the fourth to sixth place playoffs.

== Tournament ==
The 1981 Helvetia Cup was scheduled to be held from 22 to 24 January 1981 with nine countries participating in the tournament. The tournament was organized with the help of the Sandefjord Badminton Club (SaBK).

=== Venue ===
The group matches were held at the Jotunhallen while the final matches were held at the Hjertnes Hall in Sandefjord, Norway.

=== Draw ===
The group stage consists of 3 groups, Group 1, Group 2 and Group 3.

Group 1	Group 2	Group 3
Austria; Ireland; Iceland	Norway; Poland; Switzerland	Finland; France; Wales

== Group stage ==
All times are Central European Time (UTC+01:00).

=== Group 1 ===
Pos	Team	Pld	W	L	MF	MA	MD	Pts	Qualification
1	Ireland	2	2	0	14	0	+14	2	Final
2	Austria	2	1	1	4	10	−6	1	4th–6th place
3	Iceland	2	0	2	3	11	−8	0	7th–9th place

Source: National Library of Norway

22 January 1981

Ireland	7–0	Iceland
Report

Jotunhallen, Norway

22 January 1981

Austria	4–3	Iceland
Report

Jotunhallen, Norway

22 January 1981

Ireland	7–0	Austria
Report

Jotunhallen, Norway

=== Group 2 ===
Pos	Team	Pld	W	L	MF	MA	MD	Pts	Qualification
1	Norway (H)	2	2	0	14	0	+14	2	Final
2	Poland	2	1	1	5	9	−4	1	4th–6th place
3	Switzerland	2	0	2	2	12	−10	0	7th–9th place

Source: e-newspaperarchives.ch
(H) Host

22 January 1981

Norway	7–0	Switzerland
Report

Jotunhallen, Norway

22 January 1981

Poland	5–2	Switzerland
Report

Jotunhallen, Norway

22 January 1981

Norway	7–0	Poland
Report

Jotunhallen, Norway

=== Group 3 ===
Pos	Team	Pld	W	L	MF	MA	MD	Pts	Qualification
1	Wales	2	2	0	12	2	+10	2	Final
2	Finland	2	1	1	7	7	0	1	4th–6th place
3	France	2	0	2	2	12	−10	0	7th–9th place

Source: National Library of Norway

22 January 1981

Wales	7–0	France
Report

Jotunhallen, Norway

22 January 1981

Finland	5–2	France
Report

Jotunhallen, Norway

22 January 1981

Wales	5–2	Finland
Report

Jotunhallen, Norway

== Classification round ==
=== 7th–9th place ===
Pos	Team	Pld	W	L	MF	MA	MD	Pts	Qualification
1	Iceland	2	2	0	14	0	+14	2	Seventh place
2	Switzerland	2	1	1	4	10	−6	1	Eighth place
3	France	2	0	2	3	11	−8	0	Ninth place

Source: National Library of Norway

23 January 1981

Switzerland	4–3	France
Report

Jotunhallen, Norway

23 January 1981

Iceland	7–0	France
Report

Jotunhallen, Norway

23 January 1981

Switzerland	0–7	Iceland
Report

Jotunhallen, Norway

=== 4th–6th place ===
Pos	Team	Pld	W	L	MF	MA	MD	Pts	Qualification
1	Poland	2	2	0	9	5	+4	2	Fourth place
2	Finland	2	1	1	7	7	0	1	Fifth place
3	Austria	2	0	2	5	9	−4	0	Sixth place

Source: National Library of Norway

23 January 1981

Austria	2–5	Poland
Report

Jotunhallen, Norway

23 January 1981

Finland	3–4	Poland
Report

Jotunhallen, Norway

23 January 1981

Austria	3–4	Finland
Report

Jotunhallen, Norway

== Final ==
=== Round robin ===
Pos	Team	Pld	W	L	MF	MA	MD	Pts	Qualification
1	Ireland	2	2	0	10	4	+6	2	Champions
2	Norway (H)	2	1	1	7	7	0	1	Runners-up
3	Wales	2	0	2	4	10	−6	0	Third place

Source: National Library of Norway
(H) Host

==== Norway vs Wales ====
Norway
5
Hjertnes Hall
24 January 1981

Wales
2

			1	2	3
1	(Norway) (Wales)	Hans Christian Seeberg; Philip Sutton	4; 15	15; 10	13; 15
2	(Norway) (Wales)	Petter Thoresen; Mark Richards	18; 14	18; 13
3	(Norway) (Wales)	Haakon Ringdal; Lim Yim Chong	15; 5	15; 7
4	(Norway) (Wales)	Else Thoresen; Angela Nelson	11; 1	11; 6
5	(Norway) (Wales)	Haakon Ringdal / Petter Thoresen; Richard Eastwood / Philip Sutton	18; 15	15; 10
6	(Norway) (Wales)	Kari Histøl / Marianne Wikdal; Linda Blake / Sian Williams	6; 15	3; 15
7	(Norway) (Wales)	Hans Christian Seeberg / Else Thoresen; Lim Yim Chong / Linda Blake	15; 7	15; 8

==== Ireland vs Wales ====
Ireland
5
Hjertnes Hall
24 January 1981

Wales
2

			1	2	3
1	(Republic of Ireland) (Wales)	Colin Bell; Philip Sutton	5; 15	4; 15
2	(Republic of Ireland) (Wales)	Bill Thompson; Mark Richards	15; 7	14; 18	15; 12
3	(Republic of Ireland) (Wales)	Peter Ferguson; Lim Yim Chong	11; 15	16; 18
4	(Republic of Ireland) (Wales)	Diane Underwood; Sian Williams	11; 1	11; 2
5	(Republic of Ireland) (Wales)	Clifford McIlwaine / Bill Thompson; Richard Eastwood / Philip Sutton	15; 5	18; 13
6	(Republic of Ireland) (Wales)	Mary Dinan / Wendy Orr; Linda Blake / Sian Williams	18; 16	15; 11
7	(Republic of Ireland) (Wales)	Frazer Evans / Mary Dinan; Lim Yim Chong / Linda Blake	11; 15	15; 8	15; 12

==== Ireland vs Norway ====
Ireland
5
Hjertnes Hall
24 January 1981

Norway
2

			1	2	3
1	(Republic of Ireland) (Norway)	Colin Bell; Hans Christian Seeberg	9; 15	10; 15
2	(Republic of Ireland) (Norway)	Bill Thompson; Petter Thoresen	7; 15	18; 14	18; 17
3	(Republic of Ireland) (Norway)	Peter Ferguson; Haakon Ringdal	5; 15	1; 15
4	(Republic of Ireland) (Norway)	Diane Underwood; Else Thoresen	11; 5	11; 3
5	(Republic of Ireland) (Norway)	Clifford McIlwaine / Bill Thompson; Haakon Ringdal / Petter Thoresen	15; 6	15; 10
6	(Republic of Ireland) (Norway)	Mary Dinan / Wendy Orr; Kari Histøl / Marianne Wikdal	15; 9	7; 15	15; 6
7	(Republic of Ireland) (Norway)	Frazer Evans / Mary Dinan; Hans Christian Seeberg / Else Thoresen	7; 15	15; 1	15; 2

1981 Helvetia Cup winner

Ireland
First title

== Final ranking ==
Pos	Team	Pld	W	L	Pts	MD	Final result
1st place, gold medalist(s)	Ireland	4	4	0	4	+20	Champions
2nd place, silver medalist(s)	Norway (H)	4	3	1	3	+14	Runners-up
3rd place, bronze medalist(s)	Wales	4	2	2	2	+4	Third place
4	Poland	4	3	1	3	0	Fourth place
5	Finland	4	2	2	2	0	Fifth place
6	Austria	4	1	3	1	−10	Sixth place
7	Iceland	4	2	2	2	+6	Seventh place
8	Switzerland	4	1	3	1	−16	Eighth place
9	France	4	0	4	0	−18	Ninth place
