= 1975 Irish Badminton Close =

1975 Irish Close Badminton Championships
Tournament details
- Dates: 12 December 1975– 13 December 1975
- Venue: Fitzwilliam Lawn Tennis Club
- Location: Dublin, Ireland

The 1975 Irish Close Badminton Championships was a national closed badminton tournament held in Fitzwilliam Lawn Tennis Club, Dublin, Ireland from 12 to 13 December 1975.

== Final results ==
| Category | Winners | Runners-up |
|---|---|---|
| Men's singles | A. Bell | J. Scott |
| Women's singles | B. Beckett | H. Young |
| Men's doubles | A. Bell; C. Bell | B. McKee; B. Thompson |
| Women's doubles | B. Beckett; D. Cunningham | M. Dinan; S. Peard |
| Mixed doubles | J. Scott; B. Beckett | D. Doherty; D. Cunningham |
