= Irish National Badminton Championships =

Sporting competition

The Irish National Badminton Championships is a national closed badminton tournament organised annually by Badminton Ireland. The title winners are generally recognised as the national champions of Ireland in badminton.

The tournament started in 1912, featuring matches in men's singles, women's singles and men's doubles. Mixed doubles made its competition debut in 1913, with women's doubles matches commencing in 1923.

== Current Champions ==
Year	Men's singles	Women's singles	Men's doubles	Women's doubles	Mixed doubles
2026	Matthew Cheung	Sophia Noble	Scott Guildea; Paul Reynolds	Orla Flynn; Siofra Flynn	Joshua Magee; Moya Ryan

== Past Winners ==
Prior to 1976, the winners listed for each year won the Irish Close championships tournament held in December of the previous year e.g. the 1954 champions won in December 1953.

=== 1910s ===
Year	Men's singles	Women's singles	Men's doubles	Women's doubles	Mixed doubles
1912	Bob Lambert	H. Pigot	Frederick A. Kennedy; Francis O'B. Kennedy	no competition	
1913	Robert Plews	no competition	Arthur Cave; T. D. Good	no competition	Bob Lambert; N. Lambert
1914	Frederick A. Kennedy	E. F. Stewart	Frederick A. Kennedy; Francis O'B. Kennedy	no competition	
1915–1919	no competition				

=== 1920s ===
Year	Men's singles	Women's singles	Men's doubles	Women's doubles	Mixed doubles
1920	Gordon 'Curly' Mack	no competition			
1921	E. F. Stewart	no competition			
1922	Gordon 'Curly' Mack	no competition			
1923	Frederick A. Kennedy	D. Pilkington	R. A. J. Goff; R. H. Hastings	M. Homan; Stoney	R. H. Lambert; M. Homan
1924		D. Pilkington		Elizabeth Anderson; D. Pilkington	
1925	Gordon 'Curly' Mack	D. Pilkington	R. A. J. Goff; Gordon 'Curly' Mack	Ada Good; Robert Plews	Gordon 'Curly' Mack; F. Stewart
1926	no competition				
1927	Willoughby Hamilton	Ada Good	R. A. J. Goff; Willoughby Hamilton	M. Homan; D. Pilkington	Willoughby Hamilton; Ada Good
1928–1931	no competition				

=== 1930s ===
Year	Men's singles	Women's singles	Men's doubles	Women's doubles	Mixed doubles
1932	Arthur Hamilton	Mavis Hamilton	Arthur Hamilton; B. Hamilton	Derreen Good; Mavis Hamilton	Arthur Hamilton; Mavis Hamilton
1933	Arthur Hamilton	Mavis Hamilton	Willoughby Hamilton; Norman D. Good	Derreen Good; Mavis Hamilton	Willoughby Hamilton; G. Good
1934	Willoughby Hamilton	Mavis Hamilton	Willoughby Hamilton; Norman D. Good	Norma Stoker; Mavis Hamilton	Norman D. Good; Mavis Hamilton
1935	Willoughby Hamilton	Mavis Macnaughton	Thomas Boyle; James Rankin	Norma Stoker; Mavis Macnaughton	Thomas Boyle; Olive Wilson
1936	R. Hanna	Mavis Macnaughton	C. H. Maidment; E. L. Warren	Norma Stoker; Mavis Macnaughton	L. Green; G. Carty
1937	A.G. Trapnell	Norma Stoker	G. Paltridge; J. Killen	Norma Stoker; Mavis Macnaughton	C. H. Maidment; Norma Stoker
1938–1947	no competition				

=== 1940s ===
Year	Men's singles	Women's singles	Men's doubles	Women's doubles	Mixed doubles
1948	D. B. Green	Barbara J. Good	D. B. Green; Tod Majury	Nora Conway; Barbara J. Good	D. B. Green; V. H. Gillespie
1949	Jim Fitzgibbon	Barbara J. Good	Jim Fitzgibbon; Frank Peard	Nora Conway; Barbara J. Good	Jim Fitzgibbon; Barbara J. Good

=== 1950s ===
Year	Men's singles	Women's singles	Men's doubles	Women's doubles	Mixed doubles
1950	Frank Peard	B. Curran	Jim Fitzgibbon; Frank Peard	Nora Conway; Barbara J. Good	Frank Peard; Dorothy Donaldson
1951	Frank Peard	Dorothy Donaldson	Jim Fitzgibbon; Frank Peard	Nora Conway; Barbara J. Good	Frank Peard; Dorothy Donaldson
1952	Frank Peard	Jean Lawless	Jim Fitzgibbon; Frank Peard	Nora Conway; Barbara J. Good	Frank Peard; Dorothy Donaldson
1953	Frank Peard	Sheila Moore	Jim Fitzgibbon; Frank Peard	Dorothy Donaldson; Jean Lawless	Frank Peard; Dorothy Donaldson
1954	'Chick' Doyle	Esme Abraham	Jim Fitzgibbon; Frank Peard	R. Gibson; Yvonne Kelly	Jim Fitzgibbon; Barbara J. Good
1955	'Chick' Doyle	Esme Abraham	Jim Fitzgibbon; Frank Peard	Dorothy Donaldson; Jean Lawless	Frank Peard; Dorothy Donaldson
1956	'Chick' Doyle	Yvonne Kelly	Desmond Lacey 'Chick' Doyle	Dorothy Donaldson; Jean Lawless	Desmond Lacey; Jean Lawless
1957	'Chick' Doyle	Yvonne Kelly	Stuart Love; Kenneth Carlisle	Yvonne Kelly; Mary O'Sullivan	Kenneth Carlisle; Jean Duncan
1958	'Chick' Doyle	Yvonne Kelly	George Henderson; Charles McCormack	Yvonne Kelly; Mary O'Sullivan	George Henderson; Jean Sharkey
1959	'Chick' Doyle	Mary O'Sullivan	George Henderson; Charles McCormack	Yvonne Kelly; Mary O'Sullivan	Kenneth Carlisle; Lena Rea

=== 1960s ===
Year	Men's singles	Women's singles	Men's doubles	Women's doubles	Mixed doubles
1960	'Chick' Doyle	Mary O'Sullivan	George Henderson; Charles McCormack	Yvonne Kelly; Mary O'Sullivan	Kenneth Carlisle; Lena Rea
1961	'Chick' Doyle	Yvonne Kelly	Jim Fitzgibbon; Frank Peard	Yvonne Kelly; Sue Peard	Kenneth Carlisle; Lena Rea
1962	Winston Wilkinson	Mary O'Sullivan	Jim Fitzgibbon; Frank Peard	Lena McAleese; Mary O'Sullivan	Winston Wilkinson; Yvonne Kelly
1963	Robert Harris	Mary O'Sullivan	Winston Wilkinson 'Chick' Doyle	Yvonne Kelly; Mary O'Sullivan	Winston Wilkinson; Yvonne Kelly
1964	Robert Harris	Mary O'Sullivan	Winston Wilkinson 'Chick' Doyle	Lena McAleese; Sue Peard	Sammy Blair; Mary O'Sullivan
1965	Robert Harris	Yvonne Kelly	Winston Wilkinson; Sammy Blair	Yvonne Kelly; Mary Bryan	Sammy Blair; Mary O'Sullivan
1966	Robert Harris	Mary Bryan	Winston Wilkinson; Sammy Blair	Yvonne Kelly; Mary Bryan	Winston Wilkinson; Yvonne Kelly
1967	John McCloy	Yvonne Kelly	Winston Wilkinson; Sammy Blair	Yvonne Kelly; Jane Leslie	Winston Wilkinson; Yvonne Kelly
1968	Robert Harris	Mary Bryan	Winston Wilkinson; Sammy Blair	Lena McAleese; Joan McCloy	Kenneth Carlisle; Lena McAleese
1969	Peter Moore	Mary Bryan	Winston Wilkinson; Sammy Blair	Lena McAleese; Joan McCloy	Winston Wilkinson; Yvonne Kelly

=== 1970s ===
Year	Men's singles	Women's singles	Men's doubles	Women's doubles	Mixed doubles
1970	Robert Harris	Maureen Mockford	Winston Wilkinson; Sammy Blair	Lena McAleese; Joan McCloy	Winston Wilkinson; Yvonne Kelly
1971	Michael Morrow	Mary Bryan	Peter Moore; Ronnie Reddick	Yvonne Kelly; Mary Bryan	Winston Wilkinson; Yvonne Kelly
1972	Peter Moore	Mary Bryan	David Doherty; Clifford McIlwaine	Yvonne Kelly; Mary Bryan	John McCloy; Mary Bryan
1973	Colin Bell	Barbara Beckett	David Doherty; Clifford McIlwaine	Lena McAleese; Sue Peard	Adrian Bell; Barbara Beckett
1974	John Taylor	Barbara Beckett	David Doherty; Clifford McIlwaine	Barbara Beckett; Lena McAleese	Adrian Bell; Barbara Beckett
1975	John Taylor	Barbara Beckett	Adrian Bell; Colin Bell	Barbara Beckett; Dorothy Cunningham	Ronnie Reddick; Barbara Beckett
1976	Adrian Bell	Barbara Beckett	Adrian Bell; Colin Bell	Barbara Beckett; Dorothy Cunningham	John Scott; Barbara Beckett
1976 (Note: Up to 1976, the champions listed for each year won the tournament in December of the previous year i.e. the 1970 champions won in 1969. This change can be seen from the Badminton Ireland submission to Badminton Europe, in which there are two championships listed for 1976. From 1977, the winners lists refer to the same year, i.e. the tournament winners in 1978 won the titles in December 1978.)	John Scott	Barbara Beckett	John Scott; Frazer Evans	Mary Dinan; Wendy Orr	John Scott; Dorothy Cunningham
1977	Colin Bell	Dorothy Cunningham	John Scott; Frazer Evans	Mary Dinan; Wendy Orr	John Scott; Dorothy Cunningham
1978	Bill Thompson	Barbara Beckett	Bill Thompson; Clifford McIlwaine	Mary Dinan; Wendy Orr	Bill Thompson; Barbara Beckett
1979	Colin Bell	Barbara Beckett	Frazer Evans; Brien McKee	Barbara Beckett; Diane Underwood	Bill Thompson; Barbara Beckett

=== 1980s ===
Year	Men's singles	Women's singles	Men's doubles	Women's doubles	Mixed doubles
1980	John Taylor	Lynn McCrave	Frazer Evans; Brien McKee	Mary Dinan; Nikki Lane	William Cameron; Lynn McCrave
1981	Bill Thompson	Diane Underwood	Bill Thompson; Clifford McIlwaine	Mary Dinan; Wendy Orr	William Cameron; Mary Dinan
1982	John Taylor	Diane Underwood	Bill Thompson; Rikki Keag	Mary Dinan; Wendy Orr	John Scott; Nikki Lane
1983	John Taylor	Barbara Beckett	John McArdle; Barry Coffey	Barbara Beckett; Debbie Freeman	John Scott; Nikki Lane
1984	Pat Marron	Ciara Doheny	John McArdle; Barry Coffey	Ciara Doheny; Holly Lane	Graham Henderson; Nikki Lane
1985	Bill Thompson	Ciara Doheny	Bill Thompson; Rikki Keag	Nikki Lane; Ita Marron	Graham Henderson; Nikki Lane
1986	Pat Marron	Barbara Beckett	Tommy Reidy; Michael O'Meara	Ann O'Sullivan; Elaine Doyle	Rikki Keag; Ann Stephens
1987 (Note: The description of the tournament in media reports begins to change from the mid 1980's from Irish Close to Irish National Badminton Championships, with this becoming the definitive name used from 1991.)	Liam McKenna	Maeve Moynihan	Michael Watt; Eugene McKenna	Ann O'Sullivan; Holly Lane	Peter Ferguson; Holly Lane
1988	Liam McKenna	Ciara Doheny	Rikki Keag; Liam McKenna	Ann O'Sullivan; Holly Lane	Graham Henderson; Holly Lane
1989	Liam McKenna	Ciara Doheny	Eugene McKenna; Michael O'Meara	Ciara Doheny; Ann Stephens	Eugene McKenna; Angela Carr

=== 1990s ===
Year	Men's singles	Women's singles	Men's doubles	Women's doubles	Mixed doubles
1990	no competition (Note: No tournament was played in the 1990 calendar year, as it was moved from December to late January/early February, beginning in 1991.)				
1991	Michael Watt	Ciara Doheny	Peter Ferguson; Michael O'Meara	Ann O'Sullivan; Holly Lane	Peter Ferguson; Holly Lane
1992	Michael Watt	Ciara Doheny	Nial Gannon; Shane Fitzpatrick	Ann Hawkshaw; Maeve Moynihan	Graham Henderson; Jayne Plunkett
1993	Liam McKenna	Sonya McGinn	Brian McGowan; Donald O'Halloran	Sian Williams; Sonya McGinn	Bruce Topping; Ann Stephens
1994	Michael Watt	Sonya McGinn	Brian McGowan; Donal O'Halloran	Sonya McGinn; Sian Williams	Bruce Topping; Ann Stephens
1995	Bruce Topping	Sian Williams	Bruce Topping; Michael O'Meara	Ann Stephens; Jayne Plunkett	Bruce Topping; Ann Stephens
1996	Michael Watt	Elaine Kiely	Bruce Topping; Michael O'Meara	Annette Taylor; Caroline O'Sullivan	Bruce Topping; Ann Stephens
1997	Michael Watt	Keelin Fox	Mark Peard; Donal O'Halloran	Elaine Kiely; Caroline O'Sullivan	Bruce Topping; Claire Henderson
1998	Michael Watt	Sonya McGinn	Bruce Topping; Michael O'Meara	Claire Henderson; Jayne Plunkett	Bruce Topping; Jayne Plunkett
1999	Michael Watt	Sonya McGinn	Mark Peard; Donal O'Halloran	Sonya McGinn; Keelin Fox	Bruce Topping; Jayne Plunkett

=== 2000s ===
Year	Men's singles	Women's singles	Men's doubles	Women's doubles	Mixed doubles
2000	Michael Watt	Sonya McGinn	Bruce Topping; Mark Topping	Sonya McGinn; Keelin Fox	Bruce Topping; Jayne Plunkett
2001	Bruce Topping	Claire Henderson	Bruce Topping; Mark Topping	Sian Williams; Keelin Fox	Bruce Topping; Jayne Plunkett
2002	Michael Watt	Huang Bing	Eugene McKenna; Graham Henderson	Huang Bing; Keelin Fox	Donal O'Halloran; Huang Bing
2003	Ciaran D'Arcy	Jennie King	Bruce Topping; Mark Topping	Fiona Glennon; Pauline Glennon	Donal O'Halloran; Keelin Fox
2004	Ciaran D'Arcy	Huang Bing	Bruce Topping; Mark Topping	Ruth Kilkenny; Keelin Fox	Donal O'Halloran; Huang Bing
2005	Michael Watt	Erin Keery	Bruce Topping; Mark Topping	Keelin Fox; Ruth Kilkenny	David Hogan; Keelin Fox
2006	Scott Evans	Keelin Fox	Scott Evans; Brian Smyth	Ruth Kilkenny; Keelin Fox	Donal O'Halloran; Huang Bing
2007	Scott Evans	Chloe Magee	Sam Magee; Daniel Magee	Karen Bing; Chloe Magee	Donal O'Halloran; Karen Bing
2008	Scott Evans	Chloe Magee	Scott Evans; Matthew Gleave	Karen Bing; Chloe Magee	Sam Magee; Chloe Magee
2009	Scott Evans	Chloe Magee	Sam Magee; Matthew Gleave	Sandra Lynch; Keelin Fox	Sam Magee; Chloe Magee

=== 2010s ===
Year	Men's singles	Women's singles	Men's doubles	Women's doubles	Mixed doubles
2010	Scott Evans	Chloe Magee	Sam Magee; Tony Stephenson	Karen Bing; Keelin Fox	Sam Magee; Chloe Magee
2011	Scott Evans	Chloe Magee	Sam Magee; Tony Stephenson	Sinead Chambers; Jennie King	Sam Magee; Chloe Magee
2012	Scott Evans	Chloe Magee	Sam Magee; Ian Macbeth	Sinead Chambers; Jennie King	Sam Magee; Chloe Magee
2013	Scott Evans	Chloe Magee	Conor Hickland; Scott Burnside	Sinead Chambers; Jennie King	Sam Magee; Chloe Magee
2014	Jonathan Dolan	Chloe Magee	Jonathan Dolan; Sam Magee	Caroline Black; Sinead Chambers	Sam Magee; Chloe Magee
2015	Tony Stephenson	Chloe Magee	Joshua Magee; Sam Magee	Sinead Chambers; Jennie King	Sam Magee; Chloe Magee
2016	Nhat Nguyen	Chloe Magee	Joshua Magee; Sam Magee	Sinead Chambers; Jennie King	Sam Magee; Chloe Magee
2017	Nhat Nguyen	Rachael Darragh	Joshua Magee; Sam Magee	Rachael Darragh; Chloe Magee	Sam Magee; Chloe Magee
2018	Nhat Nguyen	Rachael Darragh	Joshua Magee; Paul Reynolds	Sinead Chambers; Jennie King	Ciaran Chambers; Sinead Chambers
2019	Jonathan Dolan	Kate Frost	Jonathan Dolan; David Walsh	Sara Boyle; Rachael Darragh	Sam Magee; Chloe Magee

=== 2020s ===
Year	Men's singles	Women's singles	Men's doubles	Women's doubles	Mixed doubles
2020	Nhat Nguyen	Sara Boyle	Joshua Magee; Paul Reynolds	Sara Boyle; Chloe Magee	Sam Magee; Chloe Magee
2021	Nhat Nguyen	Rachael Darragh	Joshua Magee; Paul Reynolds	Kate Frost; Moya Ryan	Paul Reynolds; Rachael Darragh
2022	Jonathan Dolan	Rachael Darragh	Joshua Magee; Paul Reynolds	Orla Flynn; Jennie King	Joshua Magee; Moya Ryan
2023	Nhat Nguyen	Sophia Noble	Joshua Magee; Paul Reynolds	Kate Frost; Moya Ryan	Joshua Magee; Moya Ryan
2024	Nhat Nguyen	Sophia Noble	Joshua Magee; Paul Reynolds	Kate Frost; Sophia Noble	Joshua Magee; Moya Ryan
2025	Dylan Noble	Sophia Noble	Scott Guildea; Paul Reynolds	Paige Woods; Rachael Woods	Joshua Magee; Moya Ryan

== Roll of honour ==
=== Men's singles ===
#	Men's singles	Titles	Years won
1	Michael Watt	10	1991, 1992, 1994, 1996, 1997, 1998, 1999, 2000, 2002, 2005
2	J.P. 'Chick' Doyle	8	1954, 1955, 1956, 1957, 1958, 1959, 1960, 1961
2	Scott Evans	8	2006, 2007, 2008, 2009, 2010, 2011, 2012, 2013
4	Nhat Nguyen	7	2016, 2017, 2018, 2020, 2021, 2023, 2024
5	Robert Harris	6	1963, 1964, 1965, 1966, 1968, 1970
6	John Taylor	5	1974, 1975, 1980, 1982, 1983
7	Frank Peard	4	1950, 1951, 1952, 1953
7	Liam McKenna	4	1987, 1988, 1989, 1993
9	Gordon 'Curly' Mack	3	1920, 1922, 1925
9	Willoughby Hamilton	3	1927, 1934, 1935
9	Colin Bell	3	1973, 1977, 1979
9	Bill Thompson	3	1978, 1981, 1985
9	Jonathan Dolan	3	2014, 2019, 2022
14	Frederick A. Kennedy	2	1914, 1923
14	Arthur Hamilton	2	1932, 1933
14	Peter Moore	2	1969, 1972
14	John Taylor	2	1974, 1975
14	Pat Marron	2	1984, 1986
14	Bruce Topping	2	1995, 2001
14	Ciaran D'Arcy	2	2003, 2004
21	Bob Lambert	1	1912
21	Robert Plews	1	1913
21	E. F. Stewart	1	1921
21	R. Hanna	1	1936
21	A.G. Trapnell	1	1937
21	D. B. Green	1	1948
21	Jim Fitzgibbon	1	1949
21	Winston Wilkinson	1	1962
21	John McCloy	1	1967
21	Michael Morrow	1	1971
21	Adrian Bell	1	1976
21	John Scott	1	1976
21	Tony Stephenson	1	2015
21	Dylan Noble	1	2025
21	Matthew Cheung	1	2026

=== Women's singles ===
#	Women's singles	Titles	Years won
1	Mary Bryan (née O'Sullivan)	10	1959, 1960, 1962, 1963, 1964, 1966, 1968, 1969, 1971, 1972
1	Chloe Magee	10	2007, 2008, 2009, 2010, 2011, 2012, 2013, 2014, 2015, 2016
3	Barbara Beckett	9	1973, 1974, 1975, 1976, 1976, 1978, 1979, 1983, 1986
4	Yvonne Kelly	6	1956, 1957, 1958, 1961, 1965, 1967
4	Ciara Doheny	6	1984, 1985, 1988, 1989, 1991, 1992
6	Mavis Macnaughton (née Hamilton)	5	1932, 1933, 1934, 1935, 1936
6	Sonya McGinn	5	1993, 1994, 1998, 1999, 2000
8	Rachael Darragh	4	2017, 2018, 2021, 2022
8	Sophia Noble	4	2023, 2024, 2025, 2026
10	D. Pilkington	3	1923, 1924, 1925
11	Barbara J. Good	2	1948, 1949
11	Esme Abraham	2	1954, 1955
11	Diane Underwood	2	1981, 1982
11	Keelin Fox	2	1997, 2006
15	H. Pigot	1	1912
15	E. F. Stewart	1	1914
15	Ada Good	1	1927
15	Norma Stoker	1	1937
15	B. Curran	1	1950
15	Dorothy Donaldson	1	1951
15	Jean Lawless	1	1952
15	Sheila Moore	1	1953
15	Maureen Mockford	1	1970
15	Dorothy Cunningham	1	1977
15	Lynn McCrave	1	1980
15	Maeve Moynihan	1	1987
15	Sian Williams	1	1995
15	Elaine Kiely	1	1996
15	Claire Henderson	1	2001
15	Jennie King	1	2003
15	Erin Keery	1	2005
15	Kate Frost	1	2019
15	Sara Boyle	1	2020
