= 1965 Irish Badminton Close =

1965 Irish Close Badminton Championships
Tournament details
- Dates: 10 December 1965– 11 December 1965
- Venue: Midland Branch Hall, Whitehall Road, Terenure
- Location: Dublin, Ireland

The 1965 Irish Close Badminton Championships was a national closed badminton tournament held in the Midland Branch Hall, Whitehall Road, Terenure, Dublin, Ireland from 10 to 11 December 1965.

== Final results ==
| Category | Winners | Runners-up |
|---|---|---|
| Men's singles | R. Harris | C.W. Wilkinson |
| Women's singles | M. Bryan | Y.W. Kelly |
| Men's doubles | C.W. Wilkinson; S. Blair | K. Carlisle; M. Adamson |
| Women's doubles | M. Bryan; Y.W. Kelly | L. McAleese; S. Peard |
| Mixed doubles | C.W. Wilkinson; Y.W. Kelly | S. Blair; M. Bryan |
