= 1977 Helvetia Cup =

Badminton event

1977 Helvetia Cup Кубок Гельвеции 1977
Tournament details
- Dates: 29 – 30 January
- Edition: 13
- Venue: Yubileyny Sports Palace
- Location: Leningrad, Soviet Union

The 1977 Helvetia Cup was the thirteenth edition of the Helvetia Cup mixed team badminton tournament. In 1976, the USSR Badminton Federation announced that the tournament would be held in Leningrad. The country would also make their first appearance in the championships.

The Soviet Union emerged as champions of the Helvetia Cup by defeating Ireland and East Germany in the final stage. East Germany also achieved a new feat by achieving a podium position in their first ever international team tournament.

== Tournament ==
The 1977 Helvetia Cup was scheduled to be held from 29 to 30 January 1977. The participating countries were increased to 11. The Soviet Union and East Germany made their debut in the tournament.

=== Venue ===
This tournament was held at the Yubileyny Sports Palace in Leningrad, Soviet Union.

=== Draw ===
The group stage consists of 3 groups, Group 1, Group 2 and Group 3.

Group 1	Group 2	Group 3
Austria; Czechoslovakia; Ireland; Hungary	Finland; Soviet Union; Wales	Belgium; East Germany; Norway; Switzerland

== Group stage ==
All times are Central European Time (UTC+01:00).

=== Group 1 ===
Pos	Team	Pld	W	L	MF	MA	MD	Pts	Qualification
1	Ireland	3	3	0	14	7	+7	3	Final
2	Czechoslovakia	3	1	2	10	11	−1	1	4th–6th place
3	Austria	3	1	2	9	12	−3	1	7th–9th place
4	Hungary	3	1	2	9	12	−3	1	10th–11th place

Source: Sovetsky Sport

29 January 1977

Ireland	5–2	Czechoslovakia
Report

Yubileyny Sports Palace, Soviet Union

29 January 1977

Austria	3–4	Hungary
Report

Yubileyny Sports Palace, Soviet Union

29 January 1977

Ireland	5–2	Austria
Report

Yubileyny Sports Palace, Soviet Union

29 January 1977

Czechoslovakia	5–2	Hungary
Report

Yubileyny Sports Palace, Soviet Union

29 January 1977

Ireland	4–3	Hungary
Report

Yubileyny Sports Palace, Soviet Union

29 January 1977

Austria	4–3	Czechoslovakia
Report

Yubileyny Sports Palace, Soviet Union

=== Group 2 ===
Pos	Team	Pld	W	L	MF	MA	MD	Pts	Qualification
1	Soviet Union (H)	2	2	0	13	1	+12	2	Final
2	Wales	2	1	1	6	8	−2	1	4th–6th place
3	Finland	2	0	2	2	12	−10	0	7th–9th place

Source: Sovetsky Sport
(H) Host

29 January 1977

Soviet Union	7–0	Finland
Report

Yubileyny Sports Palace, Soviet Union

29 January 1977

Wales	5–2	Finland
Report

Yubileyny Sports Palace, Soviet Union

29 January 1977

Soviet Union	6–1	Wales
Report

Yubileyny Sports Palace, Soviet Union

=== Group 3 ===
Pos	Team	Pld	W	L	MF	MA	MD	Pts	Qualification
1	East Germany	3	3	0	19	2	+17	3	Final
2	Norway	3	1	2	15	6	+9	1	4th–6th place
3	Belgium	3	1	2	6	15	−9	1	7th–9th place
4	Switzerland	3	1	2	2	19	−17	1	10th–11th place

Source: National Library of Norway

29 January 1977

Norway	7–0	Switzerland
Report

Yubileyny Sports Palace, Soviet Union

29 January 1977

Belgium	0–7	East Germany
Report

Yubileyny Sports Palace, Soviet Union

29 January 1977

Norway	6–1	Belgium
Report

Yubileyny Sports Palace, Soviet Union

29 January 1977

Switzerland	0–7	East Germany
Report

Yubileyny Sports Palace, Soviet Union

29 January 1977

Norway	2–5	East Germany
Report

Yubileyny Sports Palace, Soviet Union

29 January 1977

Belgium	5–2	Switzerland
Report

Yubileyny Sports Palace, Soviet Union

== Classification round ==
=== 10th–11th place ===
Pos	Team	Pld	W	L	MF	MA	MD	Pts	Qualification
1	Hungary	2	1	0	4	3	+1	1	Tenth place
2	Switzerland	2	0	1	3	4	−1	0	Eleventh place

Source: e-newspaperarchives.ch

30 January 1977

Switzerland	3–4	Hungary
Report

Yubileyny Sports Palace, Soviet Union

=== 7th–9th place ===
Pos	Team	Pld	W	L	MF	MA	MD	Pts	Qualification
1	Austria	2	2	0	12	2	+10	2	Seventh place
2	Finland	2	1	1	5	9	−4	1	Eighth place
3	Belgium	2	0	2	4	10	−6	0	Ninth place

Source: Sovetsky Sport

30 January 1977

Austria	6–1	Finland
Report

Yubileyny Sports Palace, Soviet Union

30 January 1977

Belgium	3–4	Finland
Report

Yubileyny Sports Palace, Soviet Union

30 January 1977

Austria	6–1	Belgium
Report

Yubileyny Sports Palace, Soviet Union

=== 4th–6th place ===
Pos	Team	Pld	W	L	MF	MA	MD	Pts	Qualification
1	Czechoslovakia	2	2	0	10	4	+6	2	Fourth place
2	Norway	2	1	1	6	8	−2	1	Fifth place
3	Wales	2	0	2	5	9	−4	0	Sixth place

Source: National Library of Norway

30 January 1977

Norway	4–3	Wales
Report

Yubileyny Sports Palace, Soviet Union

30 January 1977

Czechoslovakia	5–2	Wales
Report

Yubileyny Sports Palace, Soviet Union

30 January 1977

Norway	2–5	Czechoslovakia
Report

Yubileyny Sports Palace, Soviet Union

== Final ==
=== Round robin ===
Pos	Team	Pld	W	L	MF	MA	MD	Pts	Qualification
1	Soviet Union (H)	2	2	0	9	5	+4	2	Champions
2	Ireland	2	1	1	6	8	−2	1	Runners-up
3	East Germany	2	0	2	6	8	−2	0	Third place

Source: Sovetsky Sport
(H) Host

==== Ireland vs East Germany ====
Ireland
4
Yubileyny Sports Palace
30 January 1977

East Germany
3

			1	2	3
1	(Republic of Ireland) (East Germany)	Colin Bell; Edgar Michalowski	1; 15	8; 15
2	(Republic of Ireland) (East Germany)	Brien McKee; Erfried Michalowsky	12; 15	4; 15
3	(Republic of Ireland) (East Germany)	Bill Thompson; Joachim Schimpke	15; 10	17; 15
4	(Republic of Ireland) (East Germany)	Barbara Beckett; Monika Cassens	11; 6	7; 11	11; 8
5	(Republic of Ireland) (East Germany)	Clifford McIlwaine / John Scott; Edgar Michalowski / Roland Riese	8; 15	17; 14	15; 9
6	(Republic of Ireland) (East Germany)	Barbara Beckett / F. Cunningham; Monika Cassens / Angela Michalowski	15; 5	12; 15	13; 15
7	(Republic of Ireland) (East Germany)	John Scott / F. Cunningham; Erfried Michalowsky / Edgar Michalowski	15; 12	8; 15	18; 14

==== Ireland vs Soviet Union ====
Ireland
2
Yubileyny Sports Palace
30 January 1977

Soviet Union
5

			1	2	3
1	(Republic of Ireland) (Soviet Union)	Colin Bell; Konstantin Vavilov	10; 15	6; 15
2	(Republic of Ireland) (Soviet Union)	Brien McKee; Anatoliy Skripko	1; 15	8; 15
3	(Republic of Ireland) (Soviet Union)	Bill Thompson; Vyacheslav Schukin	8; 15	11; 15
4	(Republic of Ireland) (Soviet Union)	Barbara Beckett; Ludmila Markova	1; 11	11; 4	11; 2
5	(Republic of Ireland) (Soviet Union)	Clifford McIlwaine / John Scott; Nikolay Peshekhonov / Konstantin Vavilov	15; 8	12; 15	0; 15
6	(Republic of Ireland) (Soviet Union)	Barbara Beckett / F. Cunningham; Nadezhda Litvincheva / Irina Shevchenko	17; 14	15; 10
7	(Republic of Ireland) (Soviet Union)	John Scott / F. Cunningham; Nikolay Peshekhonov / Irina Shevchenko	12; 15	6; 15

==== Soviet Union vs East Germany ====
Soviet Union
4
Yubileyny Sports Palace
30 January 1977

East Germany
3

			1	2	3
1	(Soviet Union) (East Germany)	Konstantin Vavilov; Edgar Michalowski	15; 6	10; 15	15; 8
2	(Soviet Union) (East Germany)	Anatoliy Skripko; Roland Riese	15; 2	15; 9
3	(Soviet Union) (East Germany)	Vyacheslav Schukin; Erfried Michalowsky	13; 15	15; 5	15; 12
4	(Soviet Union) (East Germany)	Ludmila Markova; Monika Cassens	6; 11	4; 11
5	(Soviet Union) (East Germany)	Nikolay Peshekhonov / Konstantin Vavilov; Edgar Michalowski / Roland Riese	12; 15	17; 14	15; 10
6	(Soviet Union) (East Germany)	Nadezhda Litvincheva / Irina Shevchenko; Monika Cassens / Angela Michalowski	11; 15	11; 15
7	(Soviet Union) (East Germany)	Nikolay Peshekhonov / Irina Shevchenko; Erfried Michalowsky / Edgar Michalowski				w/o

1977 Helvetia Cup winner

Soviet Union
First title

== Final ranking ==
Pos	Team	Pld	W	L	Pts	MD	Final result
1st place, gold medalist(s)	Soviet Union (H)	4	4	0	4	+16	Champions
2nd place, silver medalist(s)	Ireland	5	4	1	4	+5	Runners-up
3rd place, bronze medalist(s)	East Germany	5	3	2	3	+15	Third place
4	Czechoslovakia	5	3	2	3	+5	Fourth place
5	Norway	5	3	2	3	+6	Fifth place
6	Wales	4	1	3	1	−6	Sixth place
7	Austria	5	3	2	3	+7	Seventh place
8	Finland	4	1	3	1	−14	Eighth place
9	Belgium	5	1	4	0	−15	Ninth place
10	Hungary	4	2	2	2	−2	Tenth place
11	Switzerland	4	0	4	0	−18	Eleventh place
