= 1961 Irish Badminton Close =

1961 Irish Close Badminton Championships
Tournament details
- Dates: 8 December 1961– 9 December 1961
- Venue: Midland Branch Hall, Whitehall Road, Terenure
- Location: Dublin, Ireland

The 1961 Irish Close Badminton Championships was a national closed badminton tournament held in the Midland Branch Hall, Whitehall Road, Terenure, Dublin, Ireland from 8 to 9 December 1961.

== Final results ==
Category	Winners	Runners-up
Men's singles	C.W. Wilkinson	C.L. Robinson
Women's singles	M. O'Sullivan	Y.W. Kelly
Men's doubles	J.J. Fitzgibbon; F.W. Peard	K. Carlisle; S. Blair
Women's doubles	M. O'Sullivan; L. McAleese	Y.W. Kelly; S. Smyth
Mixed doubles	C.W. Wilkinson; Y.W. Kelly	K. Carlisle; L. McAleese
