= 1964 Irish Badminton Close =

1964 Irish Close Badminton Championships
Tournament details
- Dates: 11 December 1964– 12 December 1964
- Venue: Midland Branch Hall, Whitehall Road, Terenure
- Location: Dublin, Ireland

The 1964 Irish Close Badminton Championships was a national closed badminton tournament held in the Midland Branch Hall, Whitehall Road, Terenure, Dublin, Ireland from 11 to 12 December 1964.

== Final results ==
Category	Winners	Runners-up
Men's singles	R. Harris	J.P. Doyle
Women's singles	Y.W. Kelly	M. Perry
Men's doubles	C.W. Wilkinson; S. Blair	N. Henderson; L. Robinson
Women's doubles	M. Bryan; Y.W. Kelly	J. McCandless; E. McFadden
Mixed doubles	S. Blair; M. Bryan	C.W. Wilkinson; Y.W. Kelly
