= 2010 Irish National Badminton Championships =

Tournament details
- Dates: 6 February 2010– 7 February 2010
- Venue: National Badminton Centre, Lisburn Racquets Club
- Location: Lisburn, Northern Ireland

The 2010 Irish National Badminton Championships was a national closed badminton tournament held in the National Badminton Centre, Lisburn Racquets Club, Lisburn, Northern Ireland from 6 to 7 February 2010.

== Final results ==
Category	Winners	Runners-up	Score
Men's singles	Scott Evans	Tony Stephenson	21 - 14; 21 - 13
Women's singles	Chloe Magee	Sinead Chambers	21 - 11; 21 - 09
Men's doubles	Sam Magee; Tony Stephenson	Daniel Magee; Mark Topping	21 - 14; 21 - 07
Women's doubles	Karen Bing; Keelin Fox	Laura Butler; Jennie King	21 - 11; 21 - 08
Mixed doubles	Sam Magee; Chloe Magee	Matthew Gleave; Sinead Chambers	20 - 22; 21 - 13; 21 - 10
