= Daphne Young =

English badminton player

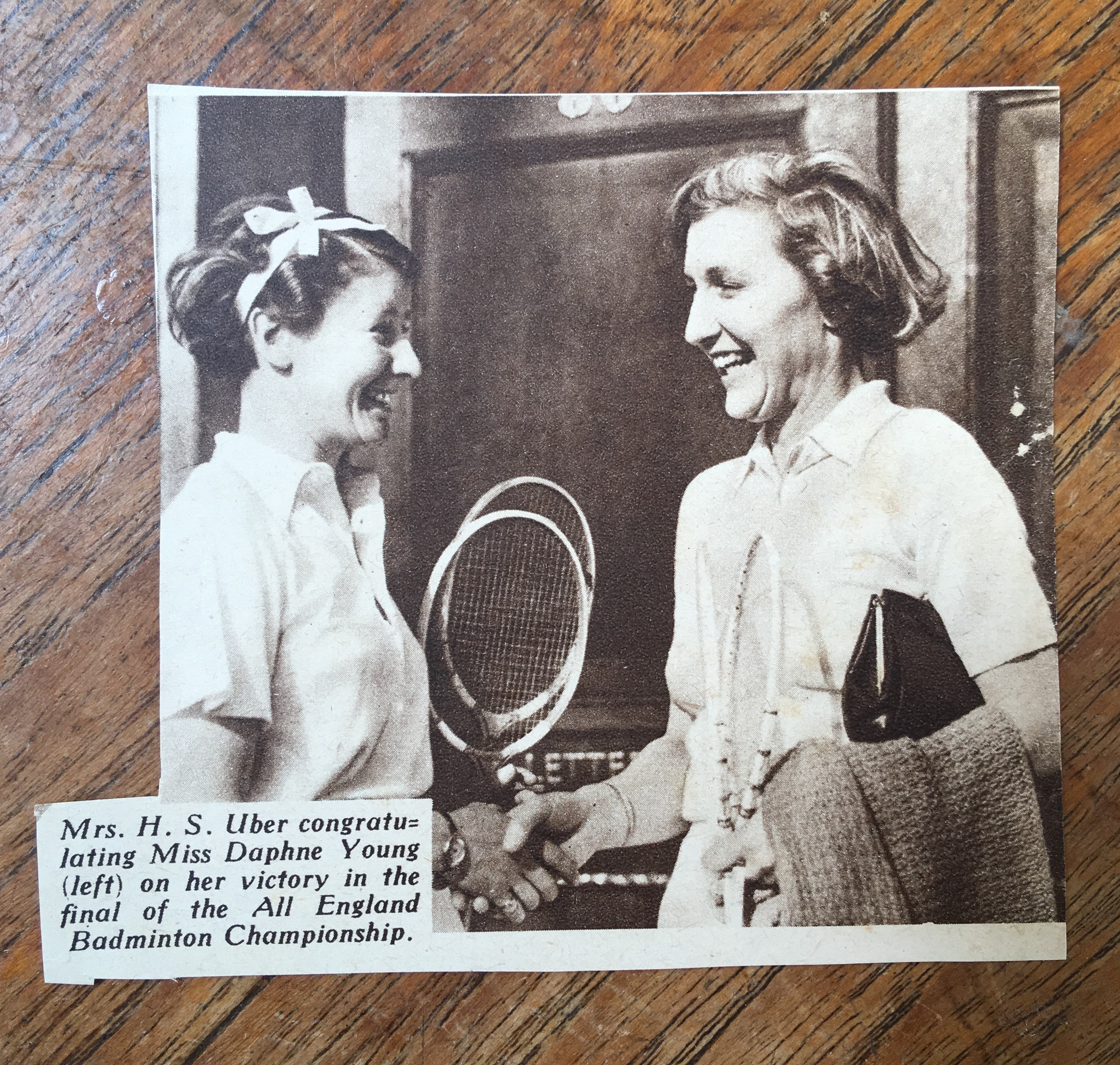

Personal information
- Born: 14 June 1915 Bedford
- Died: 30 April 1993 (aged 77) Biggleswade

Sport
- Country: England
- Sport: Badminton

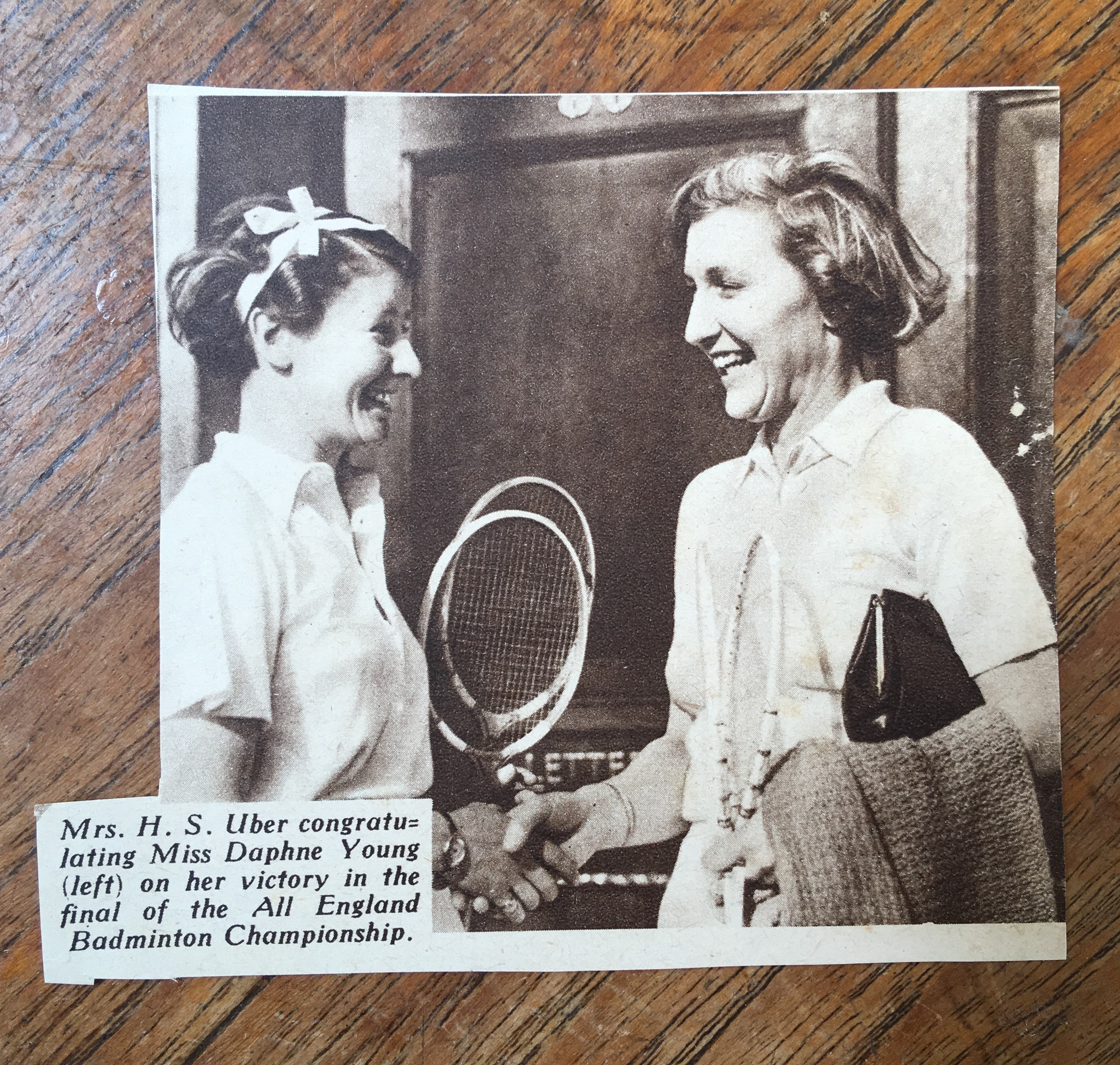
Daphne Young, winner of the All England Badminton Women's Singles Championship, being congratulated by Betty Uber, winner of the mixed doubles (with her partner, Bill White) March 1938

Daphne Mary Cece Young married name Daphne Warrington (1915-1993) was an English international badminton player.

== Badminton career ==
Young born in 1915 was a winner of the All England Open Badminton Championships. She won the 1938 All England Badminton Championships women's singles. In addition she won the 1937 Welsh International and the Scottish Open, 1938 French Open, the Irish Open singles and doubles with Denmark Open singles. Daphne broke a toe shortly before defending her All England title in 1939, and with her mobility restricted she lost to Dorothy Walton of Canada.

== Achievements ==
=== International tournaments (8 titles, 7 runners-up) ===
Women's singles
Year	Tournament	Opponent	Score	Result
1936	Scottish Open	(England) Thelma Kingsbury	3–11, 4–11	(silver) Runner-up
1937	Scottish Open	(England) Thelma Kingsbury	11–7, 11–6	(gold) Winner
1937	Welsh International	(Republic of Ireland) Norma Stoker	11–7, 11–4	(gold) Winner
1938	Scottish Open	(England) Betty Uber	11–7, 11–12, 3–11	(silver) Runner-up
1938	Irish Open	(Republic of Ireland) Mavis Macnaughton	1–11, 12–9, 12–9	(gold) Winner
1938	All England Open	(England) Betty Uber	10–12, 12–11, 11–3	(gold) Winner
1938	French Open	(England) Mavis Green	5–11, 11–5, 11–8	(gold) Winner
1938	Denmark Open	(Denmark) Tonny Ahm	11–9, 12–11	(gold) Winner
1938	Welsh International	(England) Betty Uber	11–5, 6–11, 6–11	(silver) Runner-up
1939	Scottish Open	(England) Betty Uber	9–11, 1–11	(silver) Runner-up

Women's doubles
Year	Tournament	Partner	Opponent	Score	Result
1938	Irish Open	(Republic of Ireland) Norma Stoker	(Republic of Ireland) Mavis Macnaughton (Republic of Ireland) Olive Wilson	9–15, 15–7, 15–8	(gold) Winner
1938	French Open	(England) Mavis Green	(England) F. Mercer (England) A. Simpson	15–12, 15–4	(gold) Winner
1938	Denmark Open	(England) Mavis Green	(Denmark) Tonny Ahm (Denmark) Bodil Riise	11–15, 12–15	(silver) Runner-up

Mixed doubles
Year	Tournament	Partner	Opponent	Score	Result
1938	French Open	(France) Henri Pellizza	(Republic of Ireland) Ian Maconachie (England) Mavis Green	9–15, 12–15	(silver) Runner-up
1938	Denmark Open	(Denmark) Carl Frøhlke	(Federated Malay States) Ong Hock Sim (England) Mavis Green	9–15, 15–12, 15–17	(silver) Runner-up
