= 1957 Irish Badminton Close =

1957 Irish Close Badminton Championships
Tournament details
- Dates: 6 December 1957– 14 December 1957
- Venue: Midland Branch Hall, Whitehall Road, Terenure
- Location: Dublin, Ireland

The 1957 Irish Close Badminton Championships was a national closed badminton tournament held in the Midland Branch Hall, Whitehall Road, Terenure, Dublin, Ireland from 6 to 14 December 1957.

== Final results ==
Category	Winners	Runners-up
Men's singles	J.P. Doyle	R. Harris
Women's singles	Y. Kelly	M. O'Sullivan
Men's doubles	G. Henderson; C. McCormack	J.J. Fitzgibbon; J.K.D. Lacey
Women's doubles	M. O'Sullivan; Y. Kelly	D. Donaldson; Mrs Kyle
Mixed doubles	G. Henderson; Mrs Sharkey	K. Carlisle; L. Rea
