= 1960 Irish Badminton Close =

1960 Irish Close Badminton Championships
Tournament details
- Dates: 7 December 1960– 10 December 1960
- Venue: Midland Branch Hall, Whitehall Road, Terenure
- Location: Dublin, Ireland

The 1960 Irish Close Badminton Championships was a national closed badminton tournament held in the Midland Branch Hall, Whitehall Road, Terenure, Dublin, Ireland from 7 to 10 December 1960.

== Final results ==
Category	Winners	Runners-up
Men's singles	J.P. Doyle	R. Harris
Women's singles	M. O'Sullivan	S. Peard
Men's doubles	J.J. Fitzgibbon; F.W. Peard	J.P. Doyle; C. McCormack
Women's doubles	S. Peard; Y. Kelly	L. Rea; Mrs P. Sharkey
Mixed doubles	K. Carlisle; L. Rea	J.P. Doyle; S. Peard
