= Karina Sørensen =

Danish badminton player (born 1980)

Personal information
- Born: Karina Inge Sørensen; 22 February 1980 (age 46)

Sport
- Country: Denmark
- Sport: Badminton
- Handedness: Right
- Event: Doubles

Doubles
- BWF profile
Medal record
Women's badminton
Representing Denmark
European Junior Championships
Gold medal – first place	1999 Glasgow	Mixed doubles
Silver medal – second place	1999 Glasgow	Girls' doubles
Bronze medal – third place	1999 Glasgow	Mixed team

Karina Inge Sørensen (born 22 February 1980) is a Danish retired badminton player from Hvidovre BC. She graduated with a master's degree in International Marketing from the University of Southern Denmark in 2008. She is also involved in judo as development consultant in Danish Judo & Ju-Jitsu Federation.

== Achievements ==
=== European Junior Championships ===
Girls' doubles
Year	Venue	Partner	Opponent	Score	Result
1999	Kelvin Hall; Glasgow, Scotland	(Denmark) Helle Nielsen	(Germany) Anne Hönscheid (Germany) Petra Overzier	2–15, 15–8, 9–15	Silver

Mixed doubles
Year	Venue	Partner	Opponent	Score	Result
1999	Kelvin Hall; Glasgow, Scotland	(Denmark) Mathias Boe	(Germany) Sebastian Schmidt (Germany) Anne Hönscheid	15–5, 15–4	Gold

=== BWF International Challenge/Series ===
Women's doubles
Year	Tournament	Partner	Opponent	Score	Result
2001	Belgian International	(England) Harriet Johnson	(Germany) Denise Naulin (Germany) Jana Voigtmann	15–8, 15–11	(gold) Winner
2001	Slovak International	(Denmark) Julie Houmann	(Poland) Kamila Augustyn (Belarus) Nadieżda Kostiuczyk	4–7, 4–7, 1–7	(silver) Runner-up
2001	Norwegian International	(Denmark) Julie Houmann	(Denmark) Tine Høy (Denmark) Mie Nielsen	2–7, 7–4, 6–8, 7–1, 7–4	(gold) Winner
2002	Dutch International	(Denmark) Tine Høy	(Germany) Carina Mette (Germany) Juliane Schenk	4–7, 8–7, 7–2, 7–8, 5–7	(silver) Runner-up
2002	Slovenian International	(Denmark) Lena Frier Kristiansen	(Russia) Ekaterina Ananina (Russia) Anastasia Russkikh	7–11, 5–11	(silver) Runner-up
2003	Cyprus International	(Denmark) Mette Melcher	(Cyprus) Maria Ioannou (Poland) Katarzyna Krasowska	15–13, 15–2	(gold) Winner
2003	Iceland International	(Denmark) Line Isberg	(Bulgaria) Neli Boteva (Bulgaria) Petya Nedelcheva	15–7, 9–15, 10–15	(silver) Runner-up
2003	Italian International	(Denmark) Louise Ibsen	(Italy) Agnese Allegrini (Italy) Federica Panini	12–15, 15–6, 5–15	(silver) Runner-up
2009	Slovak Open	(Denmark) Maria Lykke Andersen	(Ukraine) Marija Ulitina (Ukraine) Natalya Voytsekh	21–17, 21–10	(gold) Winner

Mixed doubles
Year	Tournament	Partner	Opponent	Score	Result
2000	Portugal International	(Denmark) Mathias Boe	(Ukraine) Valeriy Strelcov (Ukraine) Natalia Golovkina	15–4, 15–12	(gold) Winner
2000	Dutch International	(Denmark) Mathias Boe	(Netherlands) Tijs Creemers (Netherlands) Betty Krab	15–8, 15–9	(gold) Winner
2001	Belgian International	(Belgium) Wouter Claes	(Republic of Ireland) Bruce Topping (Republic of Ireland) Jayne Plunkett	15–7, 15–9	(gold) Winner
2001	Norwegian International	(Denmark) Tommy Sørensen	(Sweden) Jörgen Olsson (Sweden) Frida Andreasson	2–7, 8–7, 7–5, 4–7, 7–5	(gold) Winner
2001	Iceland International	(Denmark) Thomas Laybourn	(England) Aqueel Bhatti (England) Emma Hendry	7–2, 7–4, 7–1	(gold) Winner
2002	Slovenian International	(Canada) William Milroy	(Russia) Alexandr Russkikh (Russia) Anastasia Russkikh	5–11, 8–11	(silver) Runner-up
2002	Iceland International	(Denmark) Peter Steffensen	(Denmark) Dennis Jensen (Denmark) Stine Borgström	Walkover	(gold) Winner
2003	Cyprus International	(Denmark) Simon Mollyhus	(Denmark) Peter Hasbak (Denmark) Mette Melcher	15–10, 17–14	(gold) Winner
2003	Italian International	(Denmark) Jesper Hovgaard	(Republic of Ireland) Donal O'Halloran (Republic of Ireland) Bing Huang	15–11, 3–15, 15–11	(gold) Winner
2009	Slovak Open	(Denmark) Mark Philip Winther	(Belarus) Aliaksei Konakh (Belarus) Alesia Zaitsava	18–21, 21–9, 21–13	(gold) Winner

BWF International Challenge tournament
BWF International Series tournament
BWF Future Series tournament
