= Norman D. Good =

Irish badminton player

- Good as part of the Irish Leinster Interprovincial Badminton team 1936

Personal information
- Born: April 10, 1906 Dublin
- Died: March 1986 (aged 79) Hertfordshire

Sport
- Country: Ireland
- Sport: Badminton

Norman Douglas Good (1906-1986) was an Irish badminton player.

== Biography ==
Norman Good was the son of badminton players Dr T. D. Good and Ada Good. Two of his siblings also played badminton at national and international level, Barbara and Derreen.

== Achievements ==
Year	Tournament	Event	Winner
1933	Irish National Badminton Championships	Men's doubles	Norman D. Good / Willoughby Hamilton
1934	Irish National Badminton Championships	Mixed	Mavis Hamilton / Norman D. Good
1934	Irish National Badminton Championships	Men's doubles	Willoughby Hamilton / Norman D. Good
