= T. D. Good =

Irish badminton player

- Good at the 1903 Irish Open

Personal information
- Born: Thomas Douglas Good; 1874 Ceylon, United Kingdom
- Died: 26 April 1958 (aged 83–84) Dublin, Ireland

Sport
- Country: Ireland
- Sport: Badminton

Thomas Douglas Good (1874 – 26 April 1958) was an Irish badminton player.

== Biography ==
Good became the first non-English player to win a title at the All England Open Badminton Championships when playing with John Stokes in the men's handicap doubles at the 1902 All England Badminton Championships.

Good, alongside his wife Ada Good, took part of the first international badminton match to be played in Ireland in 1903. He reached the men's singles final, losing to Blayney Hamilton. He won the Irish Open men's doubles with Hamilton in 1904, in 1907 and 1908. With Arthur Cave he won the men's doubles at the Irish National Badminton Championships in 1913.

In 1953, Good, his wife, Sir George Thomas, and Leonard Ransford attended a Golden Jubilee lunch held by the Badminton Union of Ireland, as the only four surviving players from the 1903 international matches. They had four children, three of whom also played badminton at national and international level, Derreen, Barbara, and Norman.
