= Liam McKenna =

Liam McKenna may refer to:

- Liam McKenna (badminton) (born 1967), Northern Irish badminton player
- Liam McKenna, band member of Six (group)
