= John McCloy =

John McCloy may refer to:

- John McCloy (Medal of Honor) (1876–1945), American naval officer who was twice awarded the Medal of Honor
- John J. McCloy (1895–1989), American public official
- John McCloy (badminton), Northern Irish badminton player
