= Frazer Evans =

Northern Irish international badminton player

Personal information
- Nationality: British (Northern Irish)
- Born: c.1954

Sport
- Sport: Badminton
- Club: St. Jude's BC; St. Polycarp BC
Medal record
Representing Northern Ireland
Irish Nationals
| Gold medal – first place | 1976–77, 1979–80 | men's doubles |
Irish Open
| Gold medal – first place | 1980 | mixed doubles |

Frazer Evans (born c.1954), is a former international badminton player from Northern Ireland who competed at the Commonwealth Games and was a four-time champion of Ireland.

== Biography ==
Evans attended Belfast High School from 1965 to 1970. He was a member of St. Jude's Badminton Club before switching to St. Polycarp Badminton Club in 1972. He was an Irish U21 and junior doubles champion.

Evans represented the all-Ireland team at the international level and although primarily a singles player, he also played doubles and partners included John Scott, Bill Thompson and Dorothy Cunningham.

Evans represented the Northern Irish team at the 1978 Commonwealth Games in Edmonton, Canada, where he competed in the four events, including partnering John Scott in the men's doubles at the Games.

Evans retired from representative badminton in October 1978.

He was a four-times Irish champion at the Irish National Badminton Championships, winning the men's doubles in 1976, 1977, 1979 and 1980. He was also a mixed doubles champion at the Irish Open with Diane Underwood.

In 2018 he received an OBE for contributions to the economy, business, and charitable causes.
