= Derreen Good =

Irish badminton player

Personal information
- Born: Derreen Ada Lucy Good; 15 August 1904 Dublin

Sport
- Country: Ireland
- Sport: Badminton

Derreen Ada Lucy Good (born 1904-) was an Irish badminton player.

== Biography ==
Derreen Good was the daughter of badminton players Dr T. D. Good and Ada Good. Two of her siblings also played badminton at national and international level, Barbara and Norman. Good played her first international badminton match in 1928.

== Achievements ==
Year	Tournament	Event	Winner
1929	Irish Open	Women's singles	Derreen Good
1932	Irish National Badminton Championships	Women's doubles	Mavis Hamilton / Derreen Good
1933	Irish National Badminton Championships	Women's doubles	Mavis Hamilton / Derreen Good
