= Peter Moore (badminton) =

Northern Irish international badminton player

Personal information
- Nationality: British (Northern Irish)
- Born: born c.1945 County Antrim, Ireland

Sport
- Sport: Badminton
- Club: Christ Church BC; Ballymacarrett BC
Medal record
Representing Northern Ireland
Irish Nationals
Gold medal – first place	1969, 1972	singles
Gold medal – first place	1971	men's doubles
Irish Open
Gold medal – first place	1972	men's doubles

Peter Moore (born c.1945), is a former international badminton player from Northern Ireland who competed at the Commonwealth Games and was a three-times champion of Ireland.

== Biography ==
Moore played club badminton for Christ Church before joining Ballymacarrett in East Belfast during December 1967. Although he was principally a singles player, he was proficient in doubles play. His doubles partners included John McCloy, Adrian Bell, Ronnie Reddick and Sammy Blair.

Moore was a school teacher at the time, was based in Carrickfergus and represented the Northern Irish team at the 1970 British Commonwealth Games in Edinburgh, Scotland, where he competed in the singles and doubles events. At the Games, with John McCloy in the doubles, they were knocked out by eventual finalists Ng Tat Wai and Tan Soon Hooi of Malaysia.

During 1971 and 1972 he was Ireland's number one ranked player and was a three-times Irish champion at the Irish National Badminton Championships, winning the singles in 1969 and 1972 and the doubles with Ronnie Reddick in 1971.

In 1979, Moore was the team manager for the Irish U18 squad.

Moore left teaching to work in the leisure industry and was involved with Alton Towers and later Center Parcs UK and Ireland. In 1996 he was awarded an OBE for services to tourism.
