= David Doherty (badminton) =

Northern Irish international badminton player

Personal information
- Nationality: British (Northern Irish)
- Born: c.1950

Sport
- Sport: Badminton
- Club: St Jude's BC
Medal record
Representing Northern Ireland
Irish Nationals
Gold medal – first place	1972–74	men's doubles

David Doherty (born c.1950), is a former international badminton player from Northern Ireland who competed at the Commonwealth Games and was a three-time champion of Ireland. He was also an Irish international squash player.

== Biography ==
Doherty was a member of the St. Jude's Badminton Club. He represented Ulster at the provincial level and all-Ireland at the international level.

Although primarily a singles player, he also competed in doubles and partners included Colin Bell, Clifford McIlwaine and Barbara Beckett.

Doherty represented the Northern Irish team at the 1974 British Commonwealth Games in Christchurch, New Zealand, where he competed in the singles, men's doubles and mixed doubles events.

He was a three-times Irish champion at the Irish National Badminton Championships, winning the men's doubles with Clifford McIlwaine in 1972, 1973 and 1974.

A quantity surveyor by profession he also played squash for Ireland, making his debut in January 1978.
