= William Hamilton (cricketer) =

Irish cricketer

Personal information
- Full name: William Drummond Hamilton
- Born: 4 May 1859; Collon, Ireland
- Died: 4 March 1914 (aged 54); Oxford, Oxfordshire, England
- Batting: Left-handed
- Role: Wicket-keeper
- Relatives: Blayney Hamilton (brother)

Domestic team information
- Years: Team
- 1882: Oxford University

Career statistics
Competition	First-class
Matches	9
Runs scored	310
Batting average	20.66
100s/50s	–/2
Top score	54
Catches/stumpings	2/5
- Source: Cricinfo, 27 October 2021

William Drummond Hamilton (4 May 1859 in County Louth, Ireland – 4 March 1914 in Oxford, England) was an Irish cricketer and footballer. A left-handed batsman and wicket-keeper, he played fourteen times for the Ireland cricket team between 1883 and 1896, and also played first-class cricket for Oxford University and the MCC.

== Cricketing career ==
=== First-class career ===
Hamilton was educated at Haileybury and The Queen's College, Oxford. He played cricket for Haileybury in 1876 and 1877, and made his first-class debut for Oxford University against Australia in May 1882. He played five further matches for the University side that year against the MCC (twice), the Gentlemen of England and Surrey, before gaining his blue in June against Cambridge. He was so nervous in the match that at one point he started to run the wrong way when called for a run.

The following year, he played three first-class matches for the MCC, playing twice against Oxford University and once against Cambridge University. His top score in first-class cricket was 54 for the MCC against Oxford University.

=== Ireland career ===
Two months after his final first-class match, he made his debut for Ireland against I Zingari. He did not play again for Ireland until July 1887 when he played two matches against Canada, then spending nine years in and out of the Irish side, mainly playing against I Zingari, but also playing against Scotland, Philadelphia, South Africa and the MCC.

His last match for Ireland was against I Zingari in August 1896, in which he scored 93, his highest score for Ireland.

==== Statistics ====
In all matches for Ireland, Hamilton scored 505 runs at an average of 28.06. He scored four half-centuries and took nine catches.

== Football ==
Hamilton also played football for Dublin Association F.C. and Ireland. He played in an 1885 game against Wales. Among his team mates was his brother Willoughby Hamilton.

== Family ==
William came from a famous sporting playing family. Three brothers all excelled at sports; Willoughby Hamilton was world ranked number one at tennis at one time, Francis Cole Lowry Hamilton played cricket for Ireland and Blayney Hamilton was a badminton and cricket international. In addition three of William's nephews and nieces (children of Blayney) were badminton internationals (Arthur Hamilton, Willoughby Hamilton and Mavis Hamilton).
