= Graham Henderson (badminton) =

Northern Irish international badminton player

Personal information
- Nationality: British (Northern Irish)
- Born: 29 August 1961

Sport
- Sport: Badminton
- Club: Sandelford BC, Coleraine; Alpha BC, Lisburn
Medal record
Representing Northern Ireland
Irish Nationals
Gold medal – first place	2002	men's doubles
Gold medal – first place	1984–85, 1988, 1992	mixed doubles

Graham Henderson (born 29 August 1961), is a former international badminton player from Northern Ireland who competed at three Commonwealth Games and was a five-time champion of Ireland.

== Biography ==
Henderson was born on 29 August 1961 and came from a famous sporting family, his uncles George Henderson and Noel Henderson were both Irish badminton internationals, the latter also being a rugby international player. He was educated at University of Ulster, Jordanstown, where he graduated with a sports degree. He was a member of the Sandelford Badminton Club in Coleraine and Alpha Badminton Club of Lisburn and gained Irish caps at U18 and U21 level. His brother-in-law Scott Huey was another badminton international for Ireland. Henderson represented Ulster at provincial level and the all-Ireland team, making a full senior debut in 1984.

He specialised in doubles play and partners included Eugene McKenna and Bruce Topping in the men's doubles and Jayne Plunkett and Holly Lane and Nikki Lane in mixed doubles.

Henderson represented the 1994 Northern Irish team at the 1994 Commonwealth Games in Victoria, Canada, where he competed in the badminton tournament. At the Games he played singles and partnered Bruce Topping in the men's doubles and Jayne Plunkett in the mixed doubles.

In August 1996 Henderson married Claire Russell. He attended a second Commonwealth Games for the 1998 Northern Irish team at the 1998 Commonwealth Games in Kuala Lumpur, Malaysia, where he competed in two events.

By 1999 he had earned 50 international caps and a third Commonwealth Games appearance ensued at the 2002 Commonwealth Games in Manchester, England.

He was a five-time Irish champion at the Irish National Badminton Championships, winning the men's doubles in 2002 and the mixed doubles in 1984, 1985, 1988 and 1992.
