= Michael Watt (badminton) =

Northern Irish international badminton player

Personal information
- Nationality: British (Northern Irish)
- Born: 27 December 1964

Sport
- Sport: Badminton
- Club: Alpha BC, Lisburn
Medal record
Representing Northern Ireland
Irish Nationals
Gold medal – first place	1991–92, 1994, 1996–2000; 2002, 2005	singles
Gold medal – first place	1987	men's doubles

Michael Watt (born 27 December 1964), is a former international badminton player from Northern Ireland who competed at two Commonwealth Games and was an eleven-time champion of Ireland. In 2002 he broke the singles wins record of eight set by James 'Chick' Doyle in 1961 and extended the record to ten.

== Biography ==
Watt was a member of the Alpha Badminton Club in Lisburn. He represented Ulster at provincial level and all-Ireland at international level.

Watt was the one ranked player in Ireland for extended periods of time throughout the 1990s and represented the 1994 Northern Irish team at the 1994 Commonwealth Games in Victoria, Canada, where he competed in the badminton tournament.

He attended a second Commonwealth Games for the 1998 Northern Irish team at the 1998 Commonwealth Games in Kuala Lumpur, Malaysia, where he competed in two events.

In 1999 he won his seventh national title and in September 1999 he became the Irish national team manager, although he also continued his playing career.

He was an eleven-times Irish champion at the Irish National Badminton Championships, winning the doubles with Eugene McKenna in 1987 and the singles ten times.
