= Rikki Keag =

Northern Irish international badminton player

Personal information
- Nationality: British (Northern Irish)
- Born: c.1961

Sport
- Sport: Badminton
- Club: Alpha BC, Lisburn
Medal record
Representing Northern Ireland
Irish Nationals
Gold medal – first place	1982, 85, 88	men's doubles
Gold medal – first place	1986	mixed doubles

Rikki Keag (born c.1961), is a former international badminton player from Northern Ireland who competed at two Commonwealth Games and was a four-time champion of Ireland.

== Biography ==
Keag attended Friends' School, Lisburn and was a member of the Alpha Badminton Club in Lisburn.

Keag was a doubles specialist and partners included his brother-in-law Bill Thompson, Liam McKenna and Peter Ferguson in men's doubles.

Keag represented the 1986 Northern Irish team at the 1986 Commonwealth Games in Edinburgh, Scotland, where he competed in the three events. He went to a second Commonwealth Games after being selected for the 1986 Northern Irish team at the 1990 Commonwealth Games in Auckland, New Zealand, where he competed in three events.

Keag was a four-time Irish champion at the Irish National Badminton Championships, winning the men's doubles in 1982, 1985 and 1988 and the mixed doubles with Ann Stephens in 1986.

He retired from badminton in 1989, partly due to a persistent back injury.
