= David Doherty =

David Doherty may refer to:

- David Doherty (politician), New Hampshire politician
- David Doherty (rugby union) (born 1987), English rugby union player
- David H. Doherty, Canadian judge
- David Doherty (badminton) (born 1950), Northern Irish badminton player

== See also ==
- David O'Doherty (born 1975), Irish comedian
- David Docherty, British writer, journalist and television executive
- David Dougherty (1967–2017), New Zealander falsely convicted of abduction and rape
- Doherty (surname)
