= Edward Cousins =

Irish badminton player

Sport
- Country: Ireland
- Sport: Badminton

Men's
- Highest ranking: 1395 (MS) 21 Jun 2012; 980 (MD) 14 Mar 2013; 449 (XD)14 Mar 2013
- BWF profile

Edward Cousins is an Irish male badminton player. In 2010, he won the Irish Junior Championships in a mixed doubles event. In 2012, he won the Irish Future Series tournament in a mixed doubles event with his partner Keelin Fox.
