= Badminton Ireland =

Sports governing body on the island of Ireland

- Formation: 25 November 1899
- Type: National Sport Association
- Headquarters: Blanchardstown, Ireland
- Region served: Ireland; Northern Ireland
- President: Catherine Smyth
- Affiliations: BE, BWF
- Website: badmintonireland.com

Badminton Ireland, formally the Badminton Union of Ireland, is the national governing body for the sport of badminton in Ireland and Northern Ireland. As of January 2024, there are more than 15,000 registered players.

== History ==
Founded as the Badminton Union of Ireland in 1899, it later became one of the founding members of International Badminton Federation in 1934.

== Affiliated associations ==
Badminton Ireland has a total of 4 affiliated associations which come from Provinces of Ireland.

- Connacht
- Leinster
- Munster
- Ulster

=== Ulster Badminton ===
Ulster Badminton is also the governing body for the sport of badminton in Northern Ireland and the counties of Cavan, Donegal and Monaghan. It also governs the representation of Northern Irish players representing Northern Ireland only in Commonwealth Games.

== Tournaments ==
- Irish Open, one of the oldest badminton tournaments, first started in 1902.
- Irish International, tournament held in 2012 and 2013.
- Irish National Badminton Championships

== Olympic athletes ==
- Sonya McGinn - Sydney 2000
- Scott Evans - Beijing 2008, London 2012, Rio de Janeiro 2016
- Chloe Magee - Beijing 2008, London 2012, Rio de Janeiro 2016
- Nhat Nguyen - Tokyo 2020, Paris 2024
- Rachael Darragh - Paris 2024
