= Peter Ferguson =

Northern Irish international badminton player

Personal information
- Nationality: British (Northern Irish)
- Born: 23 April 1960 Coleraine, Northern Ireland

Sport
- Sport: Badminton
- Club: Alpha BC, Lisburn
Medal record
Representing Northern Ireland
Irish Nationals
| Gold medal – first place | 1991 | men's doubles |
| Gold medal – first place | 1987, 1991 | mixed doubles |

Peter Ronald Ferguson (born 23 April 1960) is a former international badminton player from Northern Ireland who competed at three Commonwealth Games and was a three-time champion of Ireland.

== Biography ==
Ferguson attended Coleraine Academical Institution for Boys, where he started playing badminton aged 11. He was left-handed and his first club was First Coleraine. He was coached by George Henderson during his early career.

Later Ferguson was a member of the Alpha Badminton Club in Lisburn and in 1978 received the Milk Marketing Board sports award for Ulster school leavers. He represented at Ulster provincial level and all-Ireland at international level, making his senior international debut in February 1981.

Ferguson was a teacher in Coleraine by profession and was a doubles specialist with partners including George Stephens, Clifford McIlwaine and Rikki Keag in men's doubles and Ann Stephens and Holly Lane in mixed doubles.

Ferguson represented the Northern Irish team at the 1982 Commonwealth Games in Brisbane, Australia, where he competed in the four events.

He went to a second Commonwealth Games after being selected for the 1986 Northern Irish team at the 1986 Commonwealth Games in Edinburgh, Scotland, where he competed in the three events. he then went to a third Commonwealth Games after being selected for the 1990 Northern Irish team at the 1990 Commonwealth Games in Auckland, New Zealand,

He was a three-time Irish champion at the Irish National Badminton Championships, winning the men's doubles in 1991 and the mixed doubles in 1987 and 1991.
