= Northern Ireland at the 1978 Commonwealth Games =

- CGF code: NIR
- CGA: Northern Ireland Commonwealth Games Council
- Website: nicgc.org

in Edmonton, Canada
- Flag bearers: Opening: Michael Dunlop; Closing:
- Medals Ranked 10th: Gold 2 Silver 1 Bronze 2 Total 5

Commonwealth Games appearances (overview)
- 1934; 1938; 1950; 1954; 1958; 1962; 1966; 1970; 1974; 1978; 1982; 1986; 1990; 1994; 1998; 2002; 2006; 2010; 2014; 2018; 2022; 2026; 2030

Other related appearances
- Ireland (1930)

Northern Ireland competed at the 1978 Commonwealth Games in Edmonton, Canada, from 3 to 12 August 1978.

Northern Ireland finished 10th in the medal table with two gold medals, one silver medal and two bronze medals.

The Northern Irish team was named on 13 June 1978 and consisted of 57 athletes and 10 officials. The Northern Ireland Sports Council and Recreation Trust helped with the £47,000 costs.

== Medalists ==
=== Gold ===
- Barry McGuigan (boxing)
- Gerry Hamill (boxing)

=== Silver ===
- Ken Beattie (boxing)

=== Bronze ===
- Hugh Russell (boxing)
- Ivan Weir (wrestling)

== Team ==
=== Officials ===
- Dick McColgan - General team amanager
- Billy Stewart - Assistant team manager
- Robin Harland - Doctor
- Tom Welsh - Athletics manager
- Winston Wilkinson - Badminton manager
- Bob Thompson - Lawn bowls manager
- Gerry Storey - Boxing manager
- Morris Foster - Cycling manager
- Joan Owens - Shooting manager
- Con O'Callaghan - Swimming manager

=== Athletics ===
Men

Athlete	Events	Club	Medals
Clive Beattie	400m, 400m hurdles		
Mike Bull	pole vault, decathlon		
Martin Girvan	hammer		
Greg Patrick Hannon	marathon		
William Kirkpatrick	long jump		
Paul Lawther	1500m, 5000m		
James Henry McGuinness	800m, 1500m		
John McLaughlin	marathon		

Women

Athlete	Events	Club	Medals
Vicky Hancox	100, 100m hurdles		
Linda McCurry	100, 200, 400m		
Wendy Grace Phillips	high jump, pentathlon		
Pam Reece	800m, 1500m		
Adrienne Smyth	400m, 800m		

=== Badminton ===
Men

Athlete	Events	Club	Medals
Frazer Evans	singles, doubles, mixed, team	St. Polycarp BC	
John Scott	singles, doubles, mixed, team	Alpha BC, Lisburn	
Bill Thompson	singles, doubles, mixed, team	Alpha BC, Lisburn	
Winston Wilkinson	doubles	Ballymacarrett BC	

Women

Athlete	Events	Club	Medals
Barbara Beckett	singles, doubles, mixed, team	Alpha BC, Lisburn	
Dorothy Cunningham	singles, doubles, mixed, team	St. Jude's BC	
Diane Underwood	singles, mixed, team	Lea Village BC	

=== Boxing ===
Athlete	Events	Club	Medals
Ken Beattie	67kg welterweight		Silver medal
Jim Carson	-48kg light-flyweight		
Gerry Hamill	60kg lightweight		Gold medal
Tony McAvoy	71kg light-middleweight		
Barry McGuigan	54kg bantamweight		Gold medal
Hugh Russell	51kg flyweight		Bronze medal
Kenny Webb	57kg featherweight		

=== Cycling ===
Athlete	Events	Club	Medals
Archie Cunningham	road race	Ards	
Tom Greene	scratch, time trial, indiv & team pursuit	Cyprus CC	
Billy Kerr	road race, pursuit	Ballymena	
Len Kirk	road race, indiv & team pursuit, time trial	Ards	
Padraig Shearer	scratch, time trial, sprint, team pursuit	Phoenix CC	
Joe Smyth	road race, team pursuit	British Columbia	

=== Lawn bowls ===
Athlete	Events	Club	Medals
Jimmy Donnelly	fours/rinks	Falls BC	
Michael Dunlop	fours/rinks	Ormeau BC	
Stan Espie	singles	Falls BC	
John Higgins	pairs	York Road Civil Defence BC	
Brendan McBrien	pairs	Falls BC	
Willie Murray	fours/rinks	Portrush BC	
Willie Watson	fours/rinks	Knock BC	

=== Shooting ===
Athlete	Events	Medals
George Bailie	50m rifle prone	
David Calvert	Full bore rifle Queens prize pair	
Martin Farnan	Full bore rifle Queens prize pair	
Tom Hewitt	clay pigeon trap	
George Mace	50m rifle prone	
Ken Stanford	50m free pistol, 25m rapid-fire pistol	
Trevor West	skeet	

=== Swimming ===
Men

Athlete	Events	Club	Medals
Ivan Stanley Corry	100, 200m breaststroke, 200m medley, relay		
Rob Howard	100m backstroke, relay		
Simon Henry Magowan	100, 200m backstroke, relay		
Michael John Meharg	400, 1500m freestyle, relay		

Women

Athlete	Events	Club	Medals
Jane Katharine Law	100, 200m butterfly, 100m freestyle, relay		
Claire Louise Logan	100, 200m breaststroke, relay		
Julie Parkes	100m backstroke, 100m freestyle, relay		
Catherine Janet Scott	100, 200m freestyle, relay		

=== Weightlifting ===
Athlete	Events	Club	Medals
Robert Bruce Bamford	82.5kg light-heavyweight		
Laurence McConnell	90kg middle-heavyweight		

=== Wrestling ===
Athlete	Events	Club	Medals
Ivan Weir	82kg middleweight		Bronze medal
