= Eugene McKenna (badminton) =

Northern Irish international badminton player

Personal information
- Nationality: British (Northern Irish)
- Born: born c.1968

Sport
- Sport: Badminton
- Club: Alpha BC, Lisburn
Medal record
Representing Northern Ireland
Irish Nationals
| Gold medal – first place | 1987, 1989–90 | men's doubles |
| Gold medal – first place | 1989–90 | mixed doubles |

Eugene McKenna (born c.1968), is a former international badminton player from Northern Ireland who competed at two Commonwealth Games and was a five-time champion of Ireland.

== Biography ==
McKenna played for the Alpha Badminton Club in Lisburn. He represented Ulster at provincial level and all-Ireland at international level. He specialised in doubles play and partners included Michael Watt, Michael O'Meara and Graham Henderson in the men's doubles and Angela Carr, Lisa Lynas and Ann Stephens in mixed doubles.

His sporting career was interrupted because he devoted time studying medicine and physics, which consequently resulted in McKenna only winning 14 international caps during a ten-year period. He did however represent the 1998 Northern Irish team at the 1998 Commonwealth Games in Kuala Lumpur, Malaysia, where he competed in badminton tournament. McKenna was also candidate for Northern Ireland at the 2002 Commonwealth Games and subsequently played in the men's doubles event.

He was a five-time Irish champion at the Irish National Badminton Championships, winning the men's doubles in 1987, 1989 and 1990 and the mixed doubles in 1989 and 1990.
