= Ada Good =

Irish badminton player

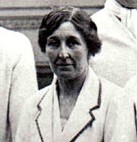
- Good at Ireland v England Badminton 1923, played at Royal Horticultural Hall, London

Personal information
- Born: Ada Baillee Carroll; 1 November 1879 Dublin
- Died: 21 February 1958 Dublin
- Spouse: T. D. Good

Sport
- Country: Ireland
- Sport: Badminton

Ada Baillie Good or Mrs T. D. Good (1 November 1879 – 21 February 1958) was an Irish badminton player.

== Biography ==
Ada Good was born Ada Baillee Carroll. Good, alongside her future husband T. D. Good, took part in the first international badminton match to be played in Ireland in 1903 at the Irish Open as Miss Carroll. She played her last international match in 1929.

In 1953, Good, her husband, Sir George Thomas, and Leonard Ransford attended a Golden Jubilee lunch held by the Badminton Union of Ireland, as the only four surviving players from the 1903 international matches. They had four children, three of whom also played badminton at national and international level, Derreen, Barbara, and Norman.
