= George Stephens (badminton) =

Northern Irish international badminton player

Personal information
- Nationality: British (Northern Irish)
- Born: c.1957

Sport
- Sport: Badminton
- Club: Alpha BC, Lisburn

George Stephens (born c.1957), is a former international badminton player from Northern Ireland who competed at the Commonwealth Games.

== Biography ==
Stephens played for the Alpha Badminton Club in Lisburn and was the Ulster and Irish U18 champion in 1976. He represented Ulster at provincial level and all-Ireland at international level.

Stephens was an architectural technician by profession and he played mixed doubles with Ann Crossan before the pair married in June 1985 at the Ballysillan Presbyterian Church in Belfast. As a doubles specialist his men's doubles partners included Peter Ferguson. He also continued to play mixed doubles with his wife.

Stephens represented the Northern Irish team at the 1986 Commonwealth Games in Edinburgh, Scotland, where he competed in the three events.

Stephens played golf at a high level, winning the 2016 Donaldson Trophy. Stephens took up pickleball and represented Ireland when he participated in the 2024 European Pickleball Championships.
