= Joan McCloy =

Northern Irish international badminton player

Joan McCloy née McCandless
Personal information
- Nationality: British (Northern Irish)

Sport
- Sport: Badminton
Medal record
Representing Northern Ireland
Irish Nationals
Gold medal – first place	1968–70	women's doubles

Joan McCloy née Joan McCandless, is a former international badminton player from Northern Ireland who competed at the Commonwealth Games and was a three-times champion of Ireland.

== Biography ==
Born Joan McCandless, she was a physical education teacher based in the Finaghy area of Belfast and represented Ulster at provincial level.

McCandless played doubles with John McCloy, an Irish international player and in July 1965, married McCloy at the Lowe Memorial Presbyterian Church, Finaghy, Belfast. She played under her married name of McCloy thereafter.

McCloy represented the Northern Irish team at the 1970 British Commonwealth Games in Edinburgh, Scotland, where she competed in the singles and doubles events.

She was a three-times Irish women's doubles champion at the Irish National Badminton Championships, winning the title with Lena McAleese in 1968, 1969 and 1970.

Capped nine times by Northern Ireland, McCloy later became the president of the Irish Hockey Association from 2000 to 2002. In 2002 she was awarded an OBE for services to hockey.
