= Blayney Hamilton =

Irish cricketer, badminton and tennis player

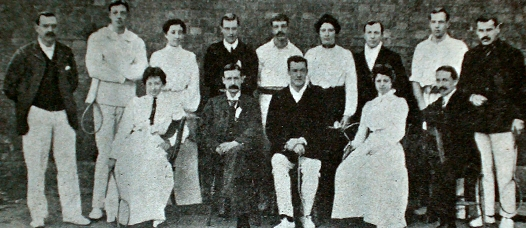

Personal information
- Full name: Blayney Balfour Hamilton
- Born: 13 June 1872; Collon, Ireland
- Died: 16 December 1946 (aged 74); Dublin, Leinster, Ireland
- Batting: Right-handed
- Bowling: Slow left-arm orthodox
- Relatives: William Hamilton (brother)

Domestic team information
- Years: Team
- 1907: Ireland

Career statistics
Competition	First-class
Matches	1
Runs scored	4
Batting average	2.00
100s/50s	–/–
Top score	4
Balls bowled	18
Wickets	0
Bowling average	–
5 wickets in innings	–
10 wickets in match	–
Best bowling	–
Catches/stumpings	2/–
- Source: Cricinfo, 27 October 2021

Blayney Balfour Hamilton (13 June 1872 in County Louth, Ireland – 16 December 1946 in Dublin, Irish Free State) was an Irish cricketer, badminton and tennis player. A right-handed batsman and left-arm spin bowler, he played nineteen times for the Ireland cricket team between 1891 and 1907, including one first-class match.

== Cricket career ==
Hamilton made his debut for Ireland against I Zingari in August 1891, and played twice more against the same opponents in July the following year. In September 1892, he went on the Irish team's tour of North America, first playing against Canada at the Toronto Cricket Club, a match in which he took 5/48, his first five-wicket haul.

This was followed by a match against All New York on Staten Island in which he scored 80 in the Irish first innings, his top score for Ireland. This was followed by a three match series against Philadelphia at Manheim. The series was drawn 1–1, and Hamilton had a good series with the ball, taking eighteen wickets in all, including 6/64 in the Philadelphian first innings of the second match, his best bowling figures for Ireland at that time. The series was notable as the debut series of Bart King, widely regarded as the greatest American cricketer of all time.

The following year saw matches against I Zingari, the Combined Services and Surrey, amongst others. He scored 60 not out in the first innings of the match against Surrey at The Oval, his second and final half-century for Ireland. The following year, he took twelve wickets in a match against I Zingari, the first time he took more than ten wickets in a match, and his figures of 6/33 in the first innings were his best for Ireland.

His cricketing career began to wind down at this point, with a match against South Africa a few days after the I Zingari match, one match against the MCC in 1895, and matches against the MCC and I Zingari in 1896. He again took ten wickets in a match against the MCC in the 1896 match.

He did come back to the Irish team on two occasions however, playing against South Africa in June 1901 after an almost five-year absence from the team, and again against South Africa in August 1907 after a more than six-year gap. His final match for Ireland was also his only first-class match.

=== Statistics ===
In all matches for Ireland, Hamilton scored 490 runs at an average of 18.85 and took 95 wickets at an average of 15.12. He scored two half-centuries, took five wickets in an innings seven times and took ten wickets in a match twice.

== Badminton career ==
Blayney born in Dublin won nine Irish Open titles from 1902-1908.

== Other sports ==
Hamilton also represented Ireland at field hockey and tennis.

== Family ==
Blayney came from a famous sporting playing family. His three older brothers all excelled at sports; William Drummond Hamilton represented Ireland at cricket and tennis, Willoughby Hamilton was world ranked number one at tennis at one time and Francis Cole Lowry Hamilton played cricket for Ireland. In addition three of Blayney's children were badminton internationals (Arthur Hamilton, Willoughby Hamilton and Mavis Hamilton).
