= Diane Underwood =

Northern Irish international badminton player

Personal information
- Nationality: British (Northern Irish)
- Born: c.1953

Sport
- Sport: Badminton
- Club: Lea Village BC
Medal record
Representing Northern Ireland
Irish Nationals
Gold medal – first place	1981–82	singles
Gold medal – first place	1979	women's doubles
Irish Open
Gold medal – first place	1980	mixed doubles

Diane Underwood (born c. 1953), is a former international badminton player from Northern Ireland who competed at two Commonwealth Games and was a three-time champion of Ireland.

== Biography ==
Underwood played badminton in Warwickshire, England, and in March 1978 was part of the English 1978 Uber Cup qualification squad. However, because her father was born in Dunadry, County Antrim, she received a call-up for the European Championships Irish team and subsequently represented all-Ireland at the international level.

Primarily a singles player she was ranked Irish number one in 1981. She did however also play doubles and partners included Frazer Evans and Barbara Beckett.

Underwood represented the Northern Irish team at the 1978 Commonwealth Games in Edmonton, Canada, where she competed in the three events. In 1979 she won four open singles titles including the West of England Championships.

Underwood represented the Northern Irish team again at the 1982 Commonwealth Games in Brisbane, Australia, where she competed in the four events. In 1982 Underwood was living still living in Birmingham and was still the Irish number one ranked player. She was regarded as the standout performer for Northern Ireland at the 1982 Commonwealth Games.

She was a three-times Irish champion at the Irish National Badminton Championships, winning the singles in 1981 and 1982 and the doubles with Barbara Beckett in 1979.

She was also the mixed doubles champion at the Irish Open with Frazer Evans in 1980.
