= Irish International =

Badminton championships

The Irish Future Series or Irish International is an international badminton tournament held in Ireland. This tournament has been a Future Series level, another tournament for higher tournament level is the Irish Open.

== Previous winners ==
Year	Men's singles	Women's singles	Men's doubles	Women's doubles	Mixed doubles
2012	(Sweden) Mattias Wigardt	(France) Perrine Lebuhanic	(Wales) Daniel Font (Wales) Oliver Gwilt	(Republic of Ireland) Sinead Chambers (Republic of Ireland) Jennie King	(Republic of Ireland) Edward Cousins (Republic of Ireland) Keelin Fox
2013	(Denmark) Kian Andersen	(France) Delphine Lansac	(Republic of Ireland) Jonathan Dolan (Republic of Ireland) Sam Magee	(Denmark) Louise Grimm Hansen (Denmark) Louise Seiersen	(Finland) Anton Kaisti (Finland) Jenny Nyström
2014; 2025	no competition				
