= Liam McKenna (badminton) =

International badminton player

Personal information
- Nationality: Northern Irish / Channel Islander
- Born: c.1967 Belfast, Northern Ireland

Sport
- Sport: Badminton
Medal record
Representing Northern Ireland
Irish Nationals
Gold medal – first place	1987—90, 1993	singles
Gold medal – first place	1988	men's doubles

Liam McKenna (born c.1967) is a former international badminton player who represented Guernsey and Northern Ireland at the Commonwealth Games and was a six-time champion of Ireland.

== Biography ==
McKenna was the 1986 Ulster and Irish U18 champion but represented the 1986 Guernsey team at the 1986 Commonwealth Games in Edinburgh, Scotland, where he competed in the badminton tournament. His qualification for Guernsey came about by virtue of his residency in the Channel Islands, where he worked in dentistry.

He went to a second Commonwealth Games after being selected for the 1990 Northern Irish team at the 1990 Commonwealth Games in Auckland, New Zealand, where he competed in three events.

He was a six-time Irish champion at the Irish National Badminton Championships, winning the singles in 1987, 1988, 1989, 1990, and 1993 and the doubles with Rikki Keag in 1988.
