= Jayne Plunkett =

Northern Irish international badminton player

Personal information
- Nationality: British (Northern Irish)
- Born: 10 August 1971 Bangor, County Down, Northern Ireland

Sport
- Sport: Badminton
- Club: Alpha BC, Lisburn
Medal record
Representing Northern Ireland
Irish Nationals
Gold medal – first place	1995, 1998	women's doubles
Gold medal – first place	1998–2001	mixed doubles

Kathleen Jayne Plunkett (born 10 August 1971), is a former international badminton player from Northern Ireland who competed at three Commonwealth Games and was a six-time champion of Ireland.

== Biography ==
Plunkett was a member of the Alpha Badminton Club in Lisburn and represented Ulster at provincial level. and made her full senior debut as a 19-year-old. She specialised in doubles play and partners included Claire Henderson and Ann Stephens in the women's doubles and Bruce Topping and Graham Henderson in mixed doubles.

Plunkett represented the 1994 Northern Irish team at the 1994 Commonwealth Games in Victoria, Canada, where she competed in the badminton tournament. At the Games she partnered Ann Stephens, reaching the quarter-finals of the women's doubles and also teamed up with Graham Henderson in the mixed doubles. By 1996 she had earned over 30 caps and attended a second Commonwealth Games for the 1998 Northern Irish team at the 1998 Commonwealth Games in Kuala Lumpur, Malaysia, where she competed in four events.

In 1999 Plunkett had 85 Irish caps and was living in Newtownards, working as a senior care nurse.

She was a six-time Irish champion at the Irish National Badminton Championships, winning the women's doubles in 1995 and 1998 and the mixed doubles in 1998, 1999, 2000 and 2001. A third Commonwealth Games appearance arrived for the 2002 Northern Irish team at the 2002 Commonwealth Games in Manchester, England, where she competed in women's doubles and mixed doubles.
