= Sonya McGinn =

Irish badminton player (born 1973)

Personal information
- Born: 17 December 1973 (age 52) Howth, Dublin, Ireland
- Height: 1.73 m (5 ft 8 in)
- Weight: 64 kg (141 lb)

Sport
- Country: Ireland
- Sport: Badminton
- Handedness: Right
- Event: Women's singles & doubles

Women's singles & doubles
- BWF profile

Sonya McGinn (born 17 December 1973) is an Irish former badminton player. She competed at the 2000 Summer Olympics in Sydney, Australia, became the first Irish player in badminton at the Summer Olympics. The Howth women lost in the second round to Mia Audina of the Netherlands, former silver medalist in 1996 Atlanta in the straight games. McGinn had won 9 times National Championships title, 5 in the women's singles and 4 in the women's doubles event.

== Achievements ==
=== IBF International ===
Women's singles

Year	Tournament	Opponent	Score	Result
1998	Irish International	(England) Justine Willmott	8–11, 8–11	(silver) Runner-up
1999	Portugal International	(Russia) Ella Karachkova	5–11, 10–13	(silver) Runner-up
2000	Chile International	(Japan) Takako Ida	6–11, 7–11	(silver) Runner-up
2000	Peru International	(Japan) Takako Ida	3–11, 3–11	(silver) Runner-up

Women's doubles

Year	Tournament	Partner	Opponent	Score	Result
1998	Irish International	(Republic of Ireland) Keelin Fox	(England) Gail Emms (England) Joanne Wright	16–17, 10–15	(silver) Runner-up
