= Arthur Hamilton (badminton) =

Irish badminton player

Personal information
- Born: 29 January 1905 Ireland
- Died: Unknown

Sport
- Country: Ireland
- Sport: Badminton

Arthur Hamilton (1905–unknown), was a male Irish badminton international.

== Badminton career ==
Hamilton was born in 1905. He won three Scottish Open titles and the 1932 Welsh International title in the doubles.

== Family ==
Arthur Hamilton came from a famous sporting playing family. His father Blayney Hamilton was a badminton and cricket international, his uncle William Drummond Hamilton represented Ireland at cricket and tennis, another uncle Willoughby Hamilton was world ranked number one at tennis at one time and a third uncle Francis Cole Lowry Hamilton played cricket for Ireland. In addition two of his siblings were badminton internationals (Willoughby Hamilton and Mavis Hamilton).
