= Mary Sinnott =

Irish camogie and badminton player

Mary Sinnott married name Dinan
Personal information
- Native name: Máire Ní Sionoid (Irish)
- Born: 1943 (age 82–83) Aughfad, Ireland
- Died: 2 November 2024

Sport
- Position: corner-back
Clubs
- Years: Club
- 1958-78: Taghmon and Oylegate-Glenbrien
Inter-county
- Years: County
- 1958-78: Wexford
Inter-county titles
- All-Irelands: 2
- All Stars: 2004 Team of Century

Mary Sinnott, married name Mary Dinan (born 1943 – 2 November 2024), was a former camogie and badminton player.

== Biography ==
Born Mary Sinnott in Aughfad, County Wexford in 1943. She was the daughter of John and Mai Sinnott (nee O'Connor). She had two brothers, Nicholas and Sean. Her uncle was Mick O'Hanlon a hurler in the Wexford All-Ireland winning teams in 1955 and 1956. She attended Loreto Convent in Wexford. She married Gay Dinan in Taghmon in 1968, and the couple moved to Dublin. They had one daughter, Elizabeth (born 1969).

== Camogie ==
She was selected on the camogie team of the century in 2004, and winner of All Ireland medals in 1968 and 1969.

She played club Camogie with Taghmon and Oylegate-Glenbrien. She also held two Gael Linn interprovincial medals and held her place on the Leinster team for ten years. In 1965 she was Wexford Player of the Year and received the Hall of Fame Award in 1980.

Her citation read "Tall and athletic, Mary was very confident on the ball, a fine catcher and striker, she was capable of turning defence into attack with one puck of the sliotar."

== Badminton ==
Having moved to Dublin, Dinan joined Pembroke Club, from where she joined the Leinster badminton team. Later she moved to KADCA, winning the Irish Open and six Irish National Badminton Championships.

She represented all-Ireland at international level, and in 1975 won her first international cap against the Netherlands, going on to represent Ireland 59 times. In Norway in 1981, she won the Helvetia Cup with seven other players. She retired from badminton in 1983, following winning Ladies Doubles with Wendy Orr and the Mixed with John Scott for the first time against England since 1903.

From 2002 to 2009, she has trained the Wexford badminton team when they won four All-Ireland victories. She coached Sonya McGinn, the first Irish Olympian badminton player. She served as the president of the Leinster branch of Badminton Ireland.

She represented Ireland on 59 occasions and was voted Wexford Badminton Star in 1965 and again in 1988.
