= Olive Wilson =

Irish badminton player

Personal information
- Born: c. 1905 Derry, Ireland
- Died: 1948 (aged 42–43)

Sport
- Country: Ireland
- Sport: Badminton

Olive Wilson (c. 1905–1948) was an Irish badminton player.

== Biography ==
Olive Wilson was born in Derry around 1905, and later moved to Belfast looking for employment. She was one of the highest ranking players from Northern Ireland in the 1930s. She played for Ireland 16 times between 1923 and 1939, winning the Irish Open several times and was also successful in the national tournaments including the Welsh International, the Denmark Open and the Scottish Open. Wilson died of tuberculosis in 1948.

== Achievements ==
Year	Tournament	Event	Winner
1933	Irish Open	Ladies singles	Olive Wilson
1933	Irish Open	Women's doubles	Marian Horsley / Olive Wilson
1935	Irish Open	Women's doubles	Marian Horsley / Olive Wilson
1935	Irish National Badminton Championships	Mixed	Thomas Boyle / Olive Wilson
1936	Denmark Open	Mixed	Thomas H. Boyle / Olive Wilson
1937	Irish Open	Mixed	James Rankin / Olive Wilson
1938	Scottish Open	Women's doubles	Olive Wilson / Betty Uber
1938	Welsh International	Mixed	Thomas Boyle / Olive Wilson
1938	Irish Open	Mixed	Thomas Boyle / Olive Wilson
1938	Welsh International	Mixed	Thomas Boyle / Olive Wilson
1939	Irish Open	Women's doubles	Mavis Macnaughton / Olive Wilson
1939	Irish Open	Mixed	Thomas Boyle / Olive Wilson
