= Holly Lane (badminton) =

Irish international badminton player

Personal information
- Nationality: Irish
- Born: c.1965

Sport
- Sport: Badminton
- Club: CYM SC, Terenure, Dublin
Medal record
Representing Ireland
Irish Nationals
Gold medal – first place	1984, 1987–88, 1991	women's doubles
Gold medal – first place	1987–88, 1991	mixed doubles

Holly Lane (born c.1965), is a former international badminton player from Ireland who competed at the Commonwealth Games and was a seven-time champion of Ireland.

== Biography ==
Lane was a member of the CYM Sports Club in Terenure, Dublin and represented Leinster at provincial level and all-Ireland at international level.

Lane was a doubles specialist and partners included Peter Ferguson in mixed doubles and Ciara Doheny and Ann O'Sullivan in women's doubles.

Despite being from Dublin, she had a mother who came from Belfast and was chosen the 1986 Northern Irish team at the 1986 Commonwealth Games in Edinburgh, Scotland, where she competed in three events.

She was a seven-times Irish champion at the Irish National Badminton Championships, winning the women's doubles in 1984, 1987, 1988 and 1991 and the mixed doubles in 1987, 1988 and 1991.

In 1989 she moved to Perth, Australia, for a planned 18 month stay.
