= Norma Stoker =

Irish badminton and tennis player (1905–1962)

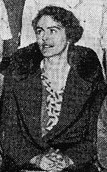
- Stoker as part of the Irish Leinster Interprovincial Badminton team 1936

Personal information
- Born: 26 March 1905 23 Westland Row, Dublin, Ireland
- Died: 21 August 1962 (aged 57) Monkstown Hospital, County Dublin, Ireland

Sport
- Sport: Badminton

Norma Esmée Stoker (26 March 1905 – 21 August 1962) was an Irish tennis and badminton player.

== Career ==
Norma Stoker was successful in both tennis and badminton. In tennis, she lost in the singles final of the Irish Open in 1931 and 1933. In badminton, she won the national singles titles from 1934 to 1937 and the women's doubles in 1937 and 1938 at the Irish Open.

== Family ==
Norma Stoker was born on 26 March 1905, the daughter of the Wimbledon champion tennis player and rugby international Frank Stoker. The writer Bram Stoker is a distant relative of hers. She is buried at Glasnevin Cemetery in Dublin.
