= Claire Henderson =

Northern Irish international badminton player

Claire Henderson née Claire Russell
Personal information
- Nationality: British (Northern Irish)
- Born: 8 October 1971 Ardstraw, Northern Ireland

Sport
- Sport: Badminton
- Club: Alpha BC, Lisburn
Medal record
Representing Northern Ireland
Irish Nationals
Gold medal – first place	2001	singles
Gold medal – first place	1998	women's doubles
Gold medal – first place	1997	mixed doubles

Claire Henderson née Claire Russell (born 8 October 1971), is a former international badminton player from Northern Ireland who competed at three Commonwealth Games and was a three-time champion of Ireland.

== Biography ==
Born Claire Russell in Ardstraw in 1971, she won age honours for Ulster. She started playing badminton in Ardstraw before moving to Lisburn where she played for the Alpha Badminton Club of Lisburn. Russell studied sport and leisure at the University of Ulster, Jordanstown and was a physical education teacher. She represented Ulster at provincial level and all-Ireland at international level, winning her first cap in the 1998 Uber Cup in Norway.

Russell represented the 1994 Northern Irish team at the 1994 Commonwealth Games in Victoria, Canada, where she competed in the badminton tournament.

In August 1996 Russell married Graham Henderson and played under her married name thereafter. She excelled at both singles and doubles play and her doubles partners included Jayne Plunkett in women's doubles and Bruce Topping in mixed doubles.

Henderson attended a second Commonwealth Games for the 1998 Northern Irish team at the 1998 Commonwealth Games in Kuala Lumpur, Malaysia, where she competed in four events. Four years later a third Commonwealth Games appearance ensued at the 2002 Commonwealth Games in Manchester.

Henderson was a three-time Irish champion at the Irish National Badminton Championships, winning the singles in 2001, the women's doubles in 1998 and the mixed doubles in 1997.
