= John McCloy (badminton) =

Northern Irish international badminton player

Personal information
- Nationality: British (Northern Irish)

Sport
- Sport: Badminton
- Club: Ulster Racquets Club
Medal record
Representing Northern Ireland
Irish Nationals
Gold medal – first place	1967	singles
Gold medal – first place	1972	mixed doubles
Irish Open
Gold medal – first place	1972	mixed doubles

John J. McCloy is a former international badminton player from Northern Ireland who competed at the Commonwealth Games and was a twice champion of Ireland.

== Biography ==
McCloy made his international debut for Ireland in March 1965, and four months later in July, married fellow badminton player Joan McCandless at the Lowe Memorial Presbyterian Church, Finaghy, Belfast.

In 1967 he was the number one ranked Irish player and became the Irish singles champion at the Irish National Badminton Championships.

In addition to singles he also played doubles and partners included Peter Moore and his wife Joan.

He played for the Ulster Racquets Club and represented the Northern Irish team at the 1970 British Commonwealth Games in Edinburgh, Scotland, where he competed in three events. He had earned 15 Irish caps by the time of the Games and played in the singles and with Peter Moore in the doubles, being knocked out by eventual finalists Ng Tat Wai and Tan Soon Hooi of Malaysia.
