= Jennie King =

Personal information
- Nationality: Irish
- Born: 28 February 1986 (age 40) Dublin, Ireland

Sport
- Sport: Badminton

Women's
- Highest ranking: 427 (WS) 17 May 2012; 121 (WD) 18 Oct 2012; 295 (XD)31 Oct 2013
- BWF profile

Jennie King (born 28 February 1986, married name Jennie Magee) is an Irish female badminton player. In 2012, she won Irish Future Series tournament in women's doubles event with her partner Sinead Chambers. In 2016, she became the coach of Irish national badminton squad U-13.

King is an eight-time Irish champion at the Irish National Badminton Championships, winning the Irish women's singles title in 2003 and the women's doubles seven times (six of which were with Sinead Chambers).

After marrying fellow badminton player Daniel Magee, the couple applied for planning permission to build an elite training sport facility in Ballymore Eustace.
