= Barbara Beckett =

Northern Irish international badminton player

Personal information
- Nationality: British (Northern Irish)
- Born: March 1952

Sport
- Sport: Badminton
- Club: Alpha BC, Lisburn
Medal record
Representing Northern Ireland
Irish Nationals
Gold medal – first place	1973–76, 1978–79; 1983, 1986	singles
Gold medal – first place	1974–76, 1979, 1983	women's doubles
Gold medal – first place	1973–76, 1978–79	mixed doubles
Irish Open
Gold medal – first place	1973, 1976	singles
Gold medal – first place	1973, 1976	women's doubles
Gold medal – first place	1973, 1976	mixed doubles

Barbara Beckett (born March 1952) is a former international badminton player from Northern Ireland who competed at two Commonwealth Games and was a 19-times champion of Ireland.

== Biography ==
Beckett won her first titles in 1973 at both the Irish Championships and the Irish Open. In the same year she also won at Welsh International.

Beckett represented the Northern Irish team at the 1974 British Commonwealth Games in Christchurch, New Zealand, where she competed in the singles, women's doubles and mixed doubles events.

Four years later she represented the Northern Irish team again at the 1978 Commonwealth Games in Edmonton, Canada, where she competed in four events.

In 1980 after earning 52 international caps she pulled out of the Irish team in order to seek a place in the English rankings. She was living in Birmingham for several years.

In 1980 she was first at the Scottish Open. In total, she won 19 national titles.

She was coached by Winston Wilkinson.

== Achievements ==
Year	Tournament	Event	Winner
1973	Irish National Badminton Championships	Mixed	Adrian Bell / Barbara Beckett
1973	Irish National Badminton Championships	Women's singles	Barbara Beckett
1973	Irish Open	Women's singles	Barbara Beckett
1973	Irish Open	Women's doubles	Barbara Beckett / Lena Rea
1973	Irish Open	Mixed	Adrian Bell / Barbara Beckett
1973	Welsh International	Mixed	Clifford McIlwaine / Barbara Beckett
1973	Welsh International	Women's singles	Barbara Beckett
1974	Irish National Badminton Championships	Mixed	Adrian Bell / Barbara Beckett
1974	Irish National Badminton Championships	Women's singles	Barbara Beckett
1974	Irish National Badminton Championships	Women's doubles	Barbara Beckett / Lena McAleese
1974	Welsh International	Women's singles	Barbara Beckett
1974	Welsh International	Women's doubles	Barbara Beckett / Sue Alfieri
1975	Irish National Badminton Championships	Women's doubles	Barbara Beckett / Dorothy Cunningham
1975	Irish National Badminton Championships	Mixed	Ronnie Reddick / Barbara Beckett
1975	Irish National Badminton Championships	Women's singles	Barbara Beckett
1976	Irish Open	Women's singles	Barbara Beckett
1976	Irish National Badminton Championships	Mixed	John Scott / Barbara Beckett
1976	Irish Open	Women's doubles	Yvonne Kelly / Barbara Beckett
1976	Irish Open	Mixed	John Scott / Barbara Beckett
1976	Irish National Badminton Championships	Women's singles	Barbara Beckett
1976	Irish National Badminton Championships	Women's singles	Barbara Beckett
1976	Irish National Badminton Championships	Women's doubles	Barbara Beckett / Dorothy Cunningham
1978	Irish National Badminton Championships	Mixed	Bill Thompson / Barbara Beckett
1978	Irish National Badminton Championships	Women's singles	Barbara Beckett
1979	Irish National Badminton Championships	Women's doubles	Barbara Beckett / Diane Underwood
1979	Irish National Badminton Championships	Women's singles	Barbara Beckett
1980	Irish National Badminton Championships	Women's doubles	Barbara Beckett / Diane Underwood
1980	Irish National Badminton Championships	Women's singles	Barbara Beckett
1979	Irish National Badminton Championships	Mixed	Bill Thompson / Barbara Beckett
1983	Irish National Badminton Championships	Women's singles	Barbara Beckett
1983	Irish National Badminton Championships	Women's doubles	Barbara Beckett / Debbie Freeman
1984	Scottish Open	Women's doubles	Barbara Beckett / Alison Fulton
1986	Irish National Badminton Championships	Women's singles	Barbara Beckett
