= Dorothy Cunningham =

Northern Irish international badminton player

Dorothy Cunningham née Haslam
Personal information
- Nationality: British (Northern Irish)
- Born: c.1949

Sport
- Sport: Badminton
- Club: Malone; St. Jude's BC
Medal record
Representing Northern Ireland
Irish Nationals
Gold medal – first place	1977	singles
Gold medal – first place	1975–76	women's doubles
Gold medal – first place	1977	mixed doubles
Irish Open
Gold medal – first place	1978	singles

Dorothy Cunningham née Dorothy Haslam (born c.1949) is a former international badminton player from Northern Ireland who competed at two Commonwealth Games and was a four-time champion of Ireland.

== Biography ==
Born Dorothy Haslam, she represented Ulster at the provincial level and all-Ireland at the international level. Haslam made her Irish debut on 21 November 1968.

She married a fellow badminton player called Frank Cunningham and played under her married name thereafter and in 1972 switched clubs from Malone to St. Judes. Cunningham won the 1976 Ulster Open and 1978 Irish Open.

Although primarily a singles player, she also played doubles and partners included John Scott, Clifford Mcllwaine, Elizabeth Thompson, Yvonne Kelly and Barbara Beckett.

Cunningham represented the Northern Irish team at the 1974 British Commonwealth Games in Christchurch, New Zealand, where she competed in the three events.

Cunningham represented the Northern Irish team again at the 1978 Commonwealth Games in Edmonton, Canada, where she competed in the four events.

She was a four-times Irish champion at the Irish National Badminton Championships, winning the singles in 1977, doubles in 1975 and 1976 and mixed doubles in 1977.

Cunningham also represented Ulster at tennis.
