= Ann Stephens (badminton) =

Northern Irish international badminton player

Ann Stephens née Ann Crossan
Personal information
- Nationality: British (Northern Irish)
- Born: c.1965

Sport
- Sport: Badminton
- Club: Holy Trinity BC; Alpha BC, Lisburn
Medal record
Representing Northern Ireland
Irish Nationals
Gold medal – first place	1989–90, 1995	wommen's doubles
Gold medal – first place	1986, 1993–96	mixed doubles

Ann Stephens née Ann Crossan (born c.1965), is a former international badminton player from Northern Ireland who competed at four Commonwealth Games and was an eight-time champion of Ireland.

== Biography ==
Born Ann Crossan, she won the Ulster U15 doubles title at the beginning of 1977. Her sister Lorraine Crossan was also a talented badminton player.

In 1979 she was paying for Holy Trinity Badminton Club and was the Irish U18 doubles champion. Later in 1980 she switched to play for the Alpha Badminton Club in Lisburn, joining her sister Lorraine at the club.

Crossan represented the Northern Irish team at the 1982 Commonwealth Games in Brisbane, Australia, where she competed in the four events.

Crossan partnered George Stephens in mixed doubles and the pair married in June 1985 at the Ballysillan Presbyterian Church in Belfast. Ann would play under her married name thereafter. Other doubles partners included Bruce Topping, Rikki Keag and Peter Ferguson in mixed doubles and Linda Andrews in women's doubles.

Stephens went to a second Commonwealth Games after being selected for the 1986 Northern Irish team at the 1986 Commonwealth Games in Edinburgh, Scotland, where she competed in the three events. She then went to a third Commonwealth Games after being selected for the 1990 Northern Irish team at the 1990 Commonwealth Games in Auckland, New Zealand. Stephens represented Northern Ireland at the Commonwelath Games for a fourth time in 1994.

She was an eight-times Irish champion at the Irish National Badminton Championships, winning three women's doubles and five mixed doubles titles.
