= Karen Bing =

Irish badminton player

Karen Bing Huang
Personal information
- Born: 1981 (age 44–45) Shenyang, Liaoning, China

Sport
- Country: Ireland
- Sport: Badminton
- BWF profile

Karen Bing Huang (born c. 1981) is an Irish badminton player of Chinese origin.

== Biography ==
Originally from Shenyang in north eastern China, Bing arrived in Ireland to learn English when she was nineteen. Within six months of her arrival her skill with badminton had her selected to train with the Irish team. She works as a physical therapist and is an Irish resident who never played for China.

Bing won all three possible titles at the national championships in Ireland in 2002. She took two more title wins in 2005. In 2007 she won the Welsh International and the Irish Open, and in 2007 the Slovak International.

== Achievements ==
=== IBF International ===
Women's doubles
Year	Tournament	Partner	Opponent	Score	Result
2006	Latvia International	(Republic of Ireland) Chloe Magee	(Estonia) Helen Reino (Estonia) Piret Hamer	–, –	(silver) Runner-up
2006	Cyprus International	(Republic of Ireland) Chloe Magee	(France) Weny Rahmawati (France) Élodie Eymard	16–21, 21–16, 14–21	(silver) Runner-up
2006	Norwegian International	(Republic of Ireland) Chloe Magee	(Scotland) Imogen Bankier (Scotland) Emma Mason	16–21, 19–21	(silver) Runner-up
2007	North Shore City International	(Republic of Ireland) Chloe Magee	(New Zealand) Catherine Moody (Vietnam) Lê Ngọc Nguyên Nhung	21–15, 16–21, 21–15	(gold) Winner
2007	Welsh International	(Republic of Ireland) Chloe Magee	(England) Sarah Walker (England) Samantha Ward	21–11, 21–14	(gold) Winner
2007	Irish International	(Republic of Ireland) Chloe Magee	(United States) Mesinee Mangkalakiri (United States) Eva Lee	21–15, 9–21, 21–11	(gold) Winner
2008	Slovak Open	(Republic of Ireland) Chloe Magee	(Poland) Anna Narel (Poland) Natalia Pocztowiak	21–8, 21–13	(gold) Winner

Mixed doubles
Year	Tournament	Partner	Opponent	Score	Result
2003	New Zealand International	(Republic of Ireland) Donal O'Halloran	(Australia) Travis Denney (Australia) Kate Wilson-Smith	8–15, 11–15	(silver) Runner-up
2003	Italian International	(Republic of Ireland) Donal O'Halloran	(Denmark) Jesper Hovgaard (Denmark) Karina Sørensen	11–15, 15–3, 11–15	(silver) Runner-up

BWF International Challenge tournament
BWF International Series tournament
