= John Scott (badminton) =

Northern Irish international badminton player

Personal information
- Nationality: British (Northern Irish)
- Born: born c.1954

Sport
- Sport: Badminton
- Club: St.Polycarp BC; Alpha BC, Lisburn
Medal record
Representing Northern Ireland
Irish Nationals
Gold medal – first place	1977	singles
Gold medal – first place	1976–77	men's doubles
Gold medal – first place	1976–77, 1982–83	mixed doubles
Irish Open
Gold medal – first place	1976–77	mixed doubles

John R. Scott (born c.1954), is a former international badminton player from Northern Ireland who competed at the Commonwealth Games and was a seven-time champion of Ireland.

== Biography ==
Scott was a member of the St. Polycarp Badminton Club and then the Alpha Badminton Club in Lisburn. In 1975, when a bank clerk in Finaghy, he also played association football for Crusaders F.C. before deciding to concentrate solely on badminton.

He represented Ulster at the provincial level and although primarily a singles player, he also played doubles and partners included Frazer Evans, Barbara Beckett and Dorothy Cunningham.

In 1977 he was the number one ranked singles player in Ireland and the following year he represented the Northern Irish team at the 1978 Commonwealth Games in Edmonton, Canada, where he competed in the four events. Scott retired from international competition after the 1978 Games.

He was a seven-times Irish champion at the Irish National Badminton Championships, winning the singles in 1977, doubles in 1976 and 1977 and the mixed doubles four times.

He was also twice mixed doubles champion at the Irish Open with Barbara Beckett in 1976 and 1977.
