= Willoughby Hamilton (born 1907) =

Irish badminton player

- Hamilton as part of the Irish Leinster Interprovincial Badminton team 1936

Personal information
- Born: 27 October 1907 Ireland
- Died: 23 February 1971 (aged 63)

Sport
- Country: Ireland
- Sport: Badminton

Willoughby Hamilton (1907–1971), was a male Irish badminton international, not to be confused with his uncle Willoughby Hamilton.

== Badminton career ==
Willoughby born in 1907 won five Irish Open titles (including four singles) from 1929 to 1934. In addition he won seven Scottish Open titles) including three singles and five Welsh International titles (including three singles).

== Family ==
Willoughby came from a famous sporting playing family. His father Blayney Hamilton was a badminton and cricket international, his uncle William Drummond Hamilton represented Ireland at cricket and tennis, another uncle Willoughby Hamilton was world ranked number one at tennis at one time and a third uncle Francis Cole Lowry Hamilton played cricket for Ireland. In addition two of his siblings were badminton internationals (Arthur Hamilton and Mavis Hamilton).
