= Mark Topping =

Northern Irish international badminton player

Personal information
- Nationality: British (Northern Irish)
- Born: 7 December 1965 Bulawayo, Zimbabwe

Sport
- Sport: Badminton
- Club: Alpha BC, Lisburn
Medal record
Representing Northern Ireland
Irish Nationals
Gold medal – first place	2000–01, 2003–05	men's doubles

Mark Topping (born 7 December 1965), is a former international badminton player from Northern Ireland who competed at the Commonwealth Games and was a five-time champion of Ireland.

== Biography ==
Topping graduated with a Business Studies degree at the University of Portsmouth in 1994 and represented Hampshire at county level. He then represented Ulster at provincial level and the all-Ireland team at international level, making his debut in the 1994 Thomas Cup.

Topping specialised in doubles play and partners included his brother Bruce Topping in the men's doubles and Nikki Lane in mixed doubles. He played for the Alpha Badminton Club in Lisburn but later moved to Dublin. In 2001 he was ranked number one in Ireland in doubles with his brother Bruce and in 2003 won two titles in the Autumn Open Championships in Dublin, winning the men's and mixed doubles.

Topping represented the 2006 Northern Irish team at the 2006 Commonwealth Games in Melbourne, Australia, where he competed in doubles events.

He was a five-time Irish champion at the Irish National Badminton Championships, winning the men's doubles in 2000, 2001, 2003, 2004 and 2005.
