= Bruce Topping =

Northern Irish international badminton player

Personal information
- Nationality: British (Northern Irish)
- Born: 25 July 1968 Bulawyo, Zimbabwe

Sport
- Sport: Badminton
- Club: Alpha BC, Lisburn
Medal record
Representing Northern Ireland
Irish Nationals
Gold medal – first place	1995, 2001	singles
Gold medal – first place	1995–96, 1998; 2000–01, 2003–05	men's doubles
Gold medal – first place	1993–2001	mixed doubles

Bruce Melvill Topping (born 25 July 1968), is a former international badminton player from Northern Ireland who competed at four Commonwealth Games and was a 19-time champion of Ireland.

== Biography ==
Topping was a member of the Alpha Badminton Club in Lisburn, although he did play for Hampshire as teenager while at college in England.

Topping represented Ulster at provincial level and all-Ireland at international level, winning the first of his 108 caps in November 1991 against Scotland. His brother Mark Topping also won international honours.

Topping went to the first of his four Commonwealth Games, when he was selected to play for the 1994 Northern Irish team at the 1994 Commonwealth Games in Victoria, Canada, where he competed in the badminton tournament. He attended a second Commonwealth Games for the 1998 Northern Irish team at the 1998 Commonwealth Games in Kuala Lumpur, Malaysia, where he competed in three events.

Although he played singles (ranking number one in Ireland), he was very successful at doubles, partnering Michael O'Meara, his brother Mark and Graham Henderson in the men's doubles and Ann Stephens, Claire Henderson and Jayne Plunkett in mixed doubles.

Two further appearances ensued at the 2002 Commonwealth Games and 2006 Commonwealth Games before he announced his retirement from playing.

At retirement he was a 19-times Irish champion at the Irish National Badminton Championships, winning the singles twice, men's doubles eight times and mixed doubles nine times.
