= Sammy Blair =

Northern Irish international badminton player

Personal information
- Nationality: British (Northern Irish)
- Born: born 1935
- Died: December 2010

Sport
- Sport: Badminton
- Club: Christ Church BC; Ballymacarrett BC
Medal record
Representing Northern Ireland
Irish Nationals
Gold medal – first place	1965–70	men's doubles
Gold medal – first place	1964–65	mixed doubles

Samuel Blair (1935 – 2010), was a former international badminton player from Northern Ireland who competed at the Commonwealth Games and was an eight-times champion of Ireland.

== Biography ==
Blair from Carrickfergus, was partnering Ken Carlisle in men's doubles during 1962 and had been capped by the combined Ireland team at international level.

He played club badminton for Christ Church before joining Ballymacarrett in East Belfast during December 1967. He specialised in doubles and partners included Winston Wilkinson and Mary O'Sullivan.

Blair represented the Northern Irish team at the 1970 British Commonwealth Games in Edinburgh, Scotland, where he competed in the doubles events. At the Games, with Wilkinson in the doubles, they reached the quarter final before being knocked out by eventual champions Ng Boon Bee and Punch Gunalan of Malaysia.

He also represented Ulster and by November 1970 had been capped 35 times by Ireland.

He was an eight-times Irish champion at the Irish National Badminton Championships, winning the men's doubles six times with Walter Wilkinson and the mixed doubles twice with Mary O'Sullivan.

Blair died in 2011.
