= Lena Rea =

Irish badminton player

Personal information
- Born: c. 1940

Sport
- Country: Ireland
- Sport: Badminton

Lena Rea later Lena McAleese (born c. 1940) is a former Irish badminton player.

== Biography ==
Lena Rea won her first national title in Ireland in 1959, winning the mixed competition with Kenneth Carlisle. In 1960 and 1961 she defended the title. In 1961, Rea won the Irish Open for the first time. Another title followed there in 1973 with Barbara Beckett.

== Achievements ==
Year	Tournament	Event	Winner
1959	Irish National Badminton Championships	Mixed	Kenneth Carlisle / Lena Rea
1960	Irish National Badminton Championships	Mixed	Kenneth Carlisle / Lena Rea
1961	Irish Open	Women's doubles	Sue Peard / Lena Rea
1961	Irish National Badminton Championships	Mixed	Kenneth Carlisle / Lena Rea
1962	Irish National Badminton Championships	Women's doubles	Lena McAleese / Mary O’Sullivan
1964	Irish National Badminton Championships	Women's doubles	Lena McAleese / Sue Peard
1968	Irish National Badminton Championships	Mixed	Kenneth Carlisle / Lena McAleese
1968	Irish National Badminton Championships	Women's doubles	Lena McAleese / Joan McCloy
1969	Irish National Badminton Championships	Women's doubles	Lena McAleese / Joan McCloy
1970	Irish National Badminton Championships	Women's doubles	Lena McAleese / Joan McCloy
1973	Irish National Badminton Championships	Women's doubles	Lena McAleese / Sue Peard
1973	Irish Open	Women's doubles	Barbara Beckett / Lena McAleese
1974	Irish National Badminton Championships	Women's doubles	Barbara Beckett / Lena McAleese
