= Clifford McIlwaine =

Northern Irish international badminton player

Personal information
- Nationality: British (Northern Irish)
- Born: April 1952 Belfast, Northern Ireland

Sport
- Sport: Badminton
- Club: Malone; Holy Trinity BC
Medal record
Representing Northern Ireland
Irish Nationals
Gold medal – first place	1972–74, 1978, 1981	men's doubles
Welsh International
Gold medal – first place	1972	mixed doubles

Clifford Ennis McIlwaine (born April 1952), is a former international badminton player from Northern Ireland who competed at the Commonwealth Games and was a five-time champion of Ireland.

== Biography ==
McIlwaine started playing badminton as a 12-year-old at the Malone club and played cricket for the Irish Schools as a wicketkeeper. He studied at Queen's University Belfast. He later played for the Holy Trinity club, represented Ulster at provincial level and all-Ireland at international level.

Primarily a doubles specialist he formed a successful men's doubles partnership with David Doherty and also partnered Bill Thompson in men's doubles and Dorothy Cunningham in mixed doubles.

McIlwaine represented the Northern Irish team at the 1982 Commonwealth Games in Brisbane, Australia, where he competed in the two events.

By November 1979 he had earned 35 Irish caps and took a two-year appointment as the Irish U18 coach. In February 1981 he set a new Irish record when he earned his 46th cap, breaking the previous record set by Ken Carlisle.

He was a five-time Irish doubles champion at the Irish National Badminton Championships, winning themen's doubles in 1972, 1973, 1974, 1978 and 1981.
