= Keelin Fox =

Sport
- Country: Ireland
- Sport: Badminton
- Event: Women's

Women's
- BWF profile

Keelin Fox is an Irish female badminton player. Fox won her senior title at the Irish National Badminton Championships in 1997. In 2006, she also won the women's singles title at Irish Championships, women's doubles titles in 1999–2002, 2004–2006, 2009 and 2010, mixed doubles titles in 2003 and 2005. In 2012, she won Irish Future Series tournament in mixed doubles event with her partner Edward Cousins.
