= Bill Thompson (badminton) =

Northern Irish international badminton player

Personal information
- Nationality: British (Northern Irish)
- Born: c.1956

Sport
- Sport: Badminton
- Club: Alpha BC, Lisburn
Medal record
Representing Northern Ireland
Irish Nationals
Gold medal – first place	1978. 1981, 1985	singles
Gold medal – first place	1978, 1981–82, 1985	men's doubles
Gold medal – first place	1978–79	mixed doubles

Bill Thompson (born c.1956), is a former international badminton player from Northern Ireland who competed at three Commonwealth Games and was a nine-times champion of Ireland.

== Biography ==
Thompson was a member of the Alpha Badminton Club of Lisburn. He represented Ulster at provincial level and the all-Ireland team at international level.

Although primarily a singles player he was also proficient at doubles and partners included Clifford McIlwaine, Rikki Keag and Barbara Beckett. A policeman in Ulster by profession he was the Irish number one ranked player during 1978.

Thompson represented the Northern Irish team at the 1978 Commonwealth Games in Edmonton, Canada, where he competed in the four events. He also represented the Northern Irish team at the 1982 Commonwealth Games in Brisbane, Australia, where he competed in the four events.

Thompson went to a third Commonwealth Games after being selected for the 1986 Northern Irish team at the 1986 Commonwealth Games in Edinburgh, Scotland, where he competed in the three events. One year later in 1987, he was awarded the Irish Badminton Writers Association player of the year.

Thompson was a nine-times Irish champion at the Irish National Badminton Championships, winning the singles in 1978, 1981 and 1985, the doubles in 1978, 1981, 1982 and 1985 and mixed doubles in 1978 and 1979.

He was president of the Alpha Badminton Club during the club's 50th anniversary in 2014.
