= Colin Bell (badminton) =

Northern Irish international badminton player

Personal information
- Nationality: British (Northern Irish)
- Born: c.1949

Sport
- Sport: Badminton
- Club: Malone Presbyterian Club
Medal record
Representing Northern Ireland
Irish Nationals
Gold medal – first place	1973, 1979	singles
Gold medal – first place	1975	men's doubles
Irish Open
Gold medal – first place	1972–73	singles
Gold medal – first place	1973	men's doubles

Colin Bell (born c.1949), is a former international badminton player from Northern Ireland who competed at the Commonwealth Games and was a three-times champion of Ireland.

== Biography ==
Bell from Dunmurry was a combined Irish international player and made his debut against the Netherlands during the 1970 Thomas Cup.

He played for the Malone Presbyterian Club with his brother Adrian Bell, who was also a full Irish international player. Although mainly a singles player he did play doubles and partners included Brian McKee and his brother Adrian. During 1973 he was the number one ranked player in Ireland.

Bell represented the Northern Irish team at the 1974 British Commonwealth Games in Christchurch, New Zealand, where he competed in the singles, doubles, mixed doubles events.

He was a three-times Irish champion at the Irish National Badminton Championships, winning the singles in 1973 and 1979 and doubles in 1975. He also won the singles championship at the Irish Open in 1972 and 1973 and doubles in 1973.
