= Winston Wilkinson (badminton) =

Northern Irish international badminton player

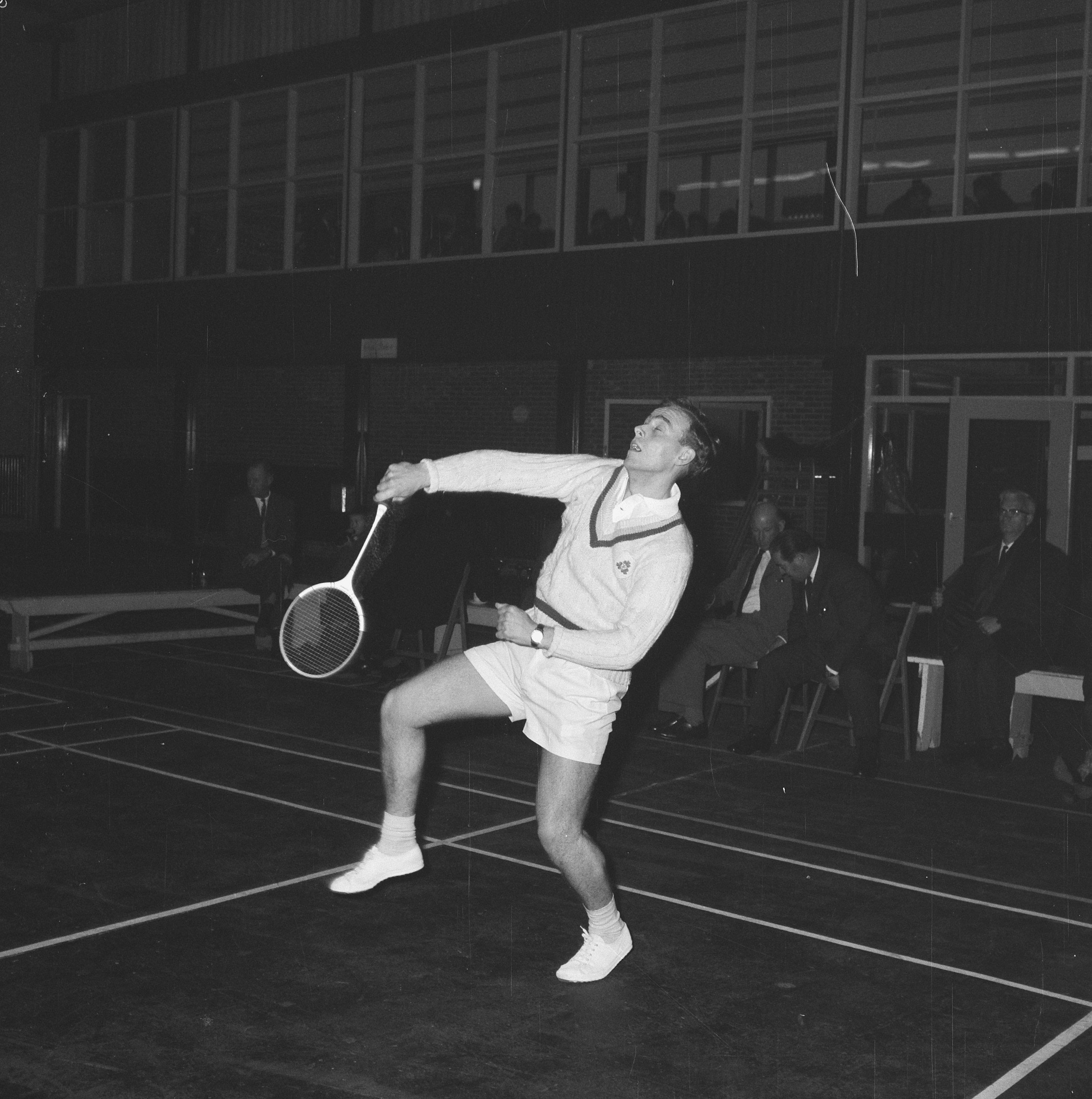

Personal information
- Nationality: British (Northern Irish)
- Born: 8 July 1940 Belfast, Northern Ireland
- Died: 10 March 2014 (aged 73) Spain

Sport
- Sport: Badminton
- Club: Christ Church BC; Ballymacarrett BC
Medal record
Representing Northern Ireland
Irish Nationals
Gold medal – first place	1962	singles
Gold medal – first place	1963–70	men's doubles
Gold medal – first place	1962–63, 1966–67; 1969–71	mixed doubles

Cyril Winston Wilkinson (8 July 1940 – 10 March 2014) was an Irish badminton player, sixteen time national champion, and badminton coach. He represented Northern Ireland at two Commonwealth Games.

== Early and personal life ==
Wilkinson was a student of Trinity College Dublin from 1959 to 1962. In 1972, he earned a Masters in Education from Queen's University Belfast, and subsequently completed his Ph.D. in the same institution in 1981, with a thesis on "A consideration of the growth of the concept of the community school, with particular reference to its development since 1930 in Great Britain and the United States of America.".

== Sporting career ==
At the age of twenty, Wilkinson started playing senior interprovincial badminton. Despite being from Ulster, he was eligible to play for Leinster by virtue of the fact he was a student in Trinity College Dublin. Footage from 1960 of a doubles match Wilkinson played in against Ulster survives in the Irish Film Institute archive. That year Wilkinson was first called up to the Ireland national badminton team as a men's doubles player in a Thomas Cup match against Denmark.

Wilkinson played club badminton for Christ Church before joining Ballymacarrett in East Belfast during December 1967.

The 1960's saw Wilkinson dominate the men's doubles and mixed doubles national titles, with a sole men's single title included for good measure. Beginning in December 1961, Wilkinson succeeded in the men's singles of the Irish National Badminton Championships. The semi-finals of that tournament saw him paired against James 'Chick' Doyle, the reigning men's single champion unbeaten since 1953. Wilkinson received a walkover as Doyle withdrew. The final saw Wilkinson overcome Lennox Robinson in two sets.

Wilkinson represented the Northern Irish team at the 1970 British Commonwealth Games in Edinburgh, Scotland, where he competed in the doubles events. At the Games, partnering Sammy Blair in the doubles, they reached the quarter final before being knocked out by eventual champions Ng Boon Bee and Punch Gunalan of Malaysia.

Wilkinson also represented the Northern Irish team at the 1978 Commonwealth Games in Edmonton, Canada, where he competed in the Men's doubles event.

== Coaching roles and later life ==
In the 1980's Wilkinson was an Irish team coach and a senior coach with the Badminton Union of Ireland. Wilkinson died in 2014 in Spain.
