= Mavis Hamilton =

Irish badminton player

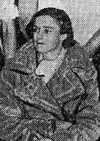
- Hamilton as part of the Irish Leinster Interprovincial Badminton team 1936

Personal information
- Born: 14 September 1911 Rathdowney, County Laois
- Died: 1958 (aged 47)

Sport
- Country: Ireland
- Sport: Badminton

Mavis Henrietta Irene Hamilton married name Mavis Macnaughton (1911–1958), was a female Irish badminton international.

== Badminton career ==
Mavis born in 1911 won three Scottish Open titles (including two singles) and four Irish Open titles (three under her married name of Macnaughton).

== Family ==
Mavis came from a famous sporting playing family. Her father Blayney Hamilton was a badminton and cricket international, her uncle William Drummond Hamilton represented Ireland at cricket and tennis, another uncle Willoughby Hamilton was world ranked number one at tennis at one time and a third uncle Francis Cole Lowry Hamilton played cricket for Ireland. In addition two of her siblings were badminton internationals (Willoughby Hamilton and Arthur Hamilton).
