= Yvonne Kelly =

Irish badminton player

Personal information
- Born: c. 1935

Sport
- Country: Ireland
- Sport: Badminton

Yvonne Kelly (born c. 1935) is an Irish badminton player.

== Biography ==
Yvonne Kelly is the daughter of badminton player Billy Kelly.

Kelly won her first titles at the Irish National Badminton Championships in 1956. She won the Irish Open for the first time two years later, and the Scottish Open in 1963. In total, she won 25 national titles and the Irish Open 10 times. She won mixed doubles with Winston Wilkinson 7 times from 1962 to 1971.

She was coached by Frank Peard, along with fellow high ranking players including James 'Chick' Doyle and Mary Bryan. Until 2019, Bryan and Kelly held the record for the most Irish National Titles won as a pair in badminton.

== Achievements ==
Year	Tournament	Event	Winner
1954	Irish National Badminton Championships	Women's doubles	R. Gobson / Yvonne Kelly
1956	Irish National Badminton Championships	Women's singles	Yvonne Kelly
1957	Irish National Badminton Championships	Women's doubles	Yvonne Kelly / Mary O'Sullivan
1957	Irish National Badminton Championships	Women's singles	Yvonne Kelly
1958	Irish National Badminton Championships	Women's singles	Yvonne Kelly
1958	Irish National Badminton Championships	Women's doubles	Yvonne Kelly / Mary O'Sullivan
1958	Irish Open	Women's singles	Yvonne Kelly
1959	Irish National Badminton Championships	Women's doubles	Yvonne Kelly / Mary O'Sullivan
1960	Irish National Badminton Championships	Women's doubles	Yvonne Kelly / Mary O'Sullivan
1960	Irish Open	Women's doubles	Yvonne Kelly / Mary O'Sullivan
1961	Irish National Badminton Championships	Women's doubles	Yvonne Kelly / Mary O'Sullivan
1961	Irish National Badminton Championships	Women's singles	Yvonne Kelly
1962	Irish National Badminton Championships	Mixed	Winston Wilkinson / Yvonne Kelly
1962	Irish Open	Women's doubles	Yvonne Kelly / Mary O'Sullivan
1963	Scottish Open	Women's doubles	Mary O'Sullivan / Yvonne Kelly
1963	Irish National Badminton Championships	Mixed	Winston Wilkinson / Yvonne Kelly
1963	Irish National Badminton Championships	Women's doubles	Yvonne Kelly / Mary O'Sullivan
1965	Irish National Badminton Championships	Women's singles	Yvonne Kelly
1965	Irish National Badminton Championships	Women's doubles	Yvonne Kelly / Mary Bryan
1966	Irish National Badminton Championships	Mixed	Winston Wilkinson / Yvonne Kelly
1966	Irish Open	Women's doubles	Yvonne Kelly / Mary Bryan
1966	Irish National Badminton Championships	Women's doubles	Yvonne Kelly / Mary Bryan
1967	Irish National Badminton Championships	Women's singles	Yvonne Kelly
1967	Irish National Badminton Championships	Mixed	Winston Wilkinson / Yvonne Kelly
1967	Irish National Badminton Championships	Women's doubles	Yvonne Kelly / James B. Leslie
1968	Irish Open	Women's doubles	Yvonne Kelly / Mary Bryan
1969	Irish National Badminton Championships	Mixed	Winston Wilkinson / Yvonne Kelly
1970	Irish Open	Women's doubles	Yvonne Kelly / Sue Peard
1970	Irish Open	Women's singles	Yvonne Kelly
1970	Irish National Badminton Championships	Mixed	Winston Wilkinson / Yvonne Kelly
1971	Irish National Badminton Championships	Mixed	Winston Wilkinson / Yvonne Kelly
1971	Irish National Badminton Championships	Women's doubles	Yvonne Kelly / Mary Bryan
1972	Irish Open	Women's doubles	Yvonne Kelly / Mary Bryan
1972	Irish Open	Women's singles	Yvonne Kelly
1972	Irish National Badminton Championships	Women's doubles	Yvonne Kelly / Mary Bryan
1976	Irish Open	Women's doubles	Yvonne Kelly / Barbara Beckett
