= Mary Bryan (badminton) =

Irish badminton player

Mary Bryan (née O'Sullivan)
Personal information
- Born: Mary O'Sullivan; 1936 Tralee, County Kerry, Ireland
- Died: 26 October 2017 (aged 80–81)

Sport
- Country: Ireland
- Sport: Badminton

Mary Bryan, née Mary O'Sullivan (1936 – 26 October 2017) was an Irish badminton player. During her career, she was deemed to be one of the top five badminton players in the world. She was a 24-times Irish champion at the Irish National Badminton Championships, winning 14 titles under maiden name and ten more under her married name.

== Life ==
Mary Bryan was born Mary O'Sullivan in Tralee, County Kerry in 1936. She attended the Dominican school, Sion Hill, before entering University College Dublin (UCD) to study architecture. After graduation, she worked for Guinness as an architect in London and Dublin. She married Eddie Bryan, and the family moved to Spain in 1974, living there until 1981. In 1995, she was received an MA in Urban and Building conservation from UCD. She was an active member of the Irish Georgian Society, serving as the Executive Secretary and Conservation Officer. She was appointed to An Bord Pleanála from 2005 to 2010, and sat on the Committee of Management of the Irish Georgian Foundation, serving as chair. Bryan died on 26 October 2017.

== Badminton career ==
In badminton, Bryan was believed to be in the top 5 players internationally, and was the first woman captain of badminton in Ireland. She played for Ireland over 40 times, winning the Irish Close and Irish Open at Singles, Women's Doubles and Mixed Doubles multiple times. She reached the semi-final of the All-England Women's Singles Championships three times (1962, 1963 and 1964). She won a number of national and international titles with Yvonne Kelly. As a member of Pembroke Badminton Club, she won a number of Irish Senior Cup titles. She was an honorary member of Badminton Ireland, Leinster Branch and Pembroke Badminton Club. After retirement, she was a coach and was involved in the Irish badminton National Coach Training Centre.

She played tennis as well as badminton, winning the Junior Irish Open Championship in 1954 as well as playing single and mixed doubles at Wimbledon. She was coached by Frank Peard, along with fellow high ranking players including James 'Chick' Doyle and Yvonne Kelly. Until 2019, Bryan and Kelly held the record for the most Irish National Titles won as a pair in badminton.
