= Badminton at the 2014 Commonwealth Games – Men's doubles =

Badminton – Men's doubles at the 2014 Commonwealth Games
- Venue: Emirates Arena, Glasgow
- Dates: 29 July – 3 August 2014
- Competitors: 80 from 27 nations

Medalists
gold medal	Tan Wee Kiong; Goh V Shem	Malaysia
silver medal	Chayut Triyachart; Danny Bawa Chrisnanta	Singapore
bronze medal	Chris Langridge; Peter Mills	England

The men's doubles badminton event at the 2014 Commonwealth Games will be held from July 29 to August 3 at the Emirates Arena in Glasgow.

== Seeds ==
The seeds for the tournament were:

1. Chris Adcock (ENG) / Andrew Ellis (ENG) (semifinals, fourth place)
2. Chris Langridge (ENG) / Peter Mills (ENG) (semifinals, bronze medalists)
3. Danny Bawa Chrisnanta (SIN) / Chayut Triyachart (SIN) (finals, silver Medalists)
4. Robin Middleton (AUS) / Ross Smith (AUS) (quarterfinals)
5. Adrian Liu (CAN) / Derrick Ng (CAN) (round of 16)
6. Pranav Chopra (IND) / Akshay Dewalkar (IND) (round of 16)
7. Raymond Tam (AUS) / Glenn Warfe (AUS) (quarterfinals)
8. Kevin Dennerly-Minturn (NZL) / Oliver Leydon-Davis (NZL) (round of 16)

The gold medalists for this event were not seeded.

== Draw ==
=== Key ===
- INV = Tripartite invitation
- IP = ITF place
- Alt = Alternate
- w/o = Walkover
- r = Retired
- d = Defaulted

=== Finals ===
Quarterfinals
1	Chris Adcock (ENG); Andrew Ellis (ENG)	17	21	21
Daniel Font (WAL); Oliver Gwilt (WAL)	21	16	15
4	Robin Middleton (AUS); Ross Smith (AUS)	17	19
Tan Wee Kiong (MAS); Goh Wei Shem (MAS)	21	21
Robert Blair (SCO); Paul van Rietvelde (SCO)	8	16
3	Danny Bawa Chrisnanta (SIN); Chayut Triyachart (SIN)	21	21
7	Raymond Tam (AUS); Glenn Warfe (AUS)	10	11
2	Chris Langridge (ENG); Peter Mills (ENG)	21	21

Semifinals
1	Chris Adcock (ENG); Andrew Ellis (ENG)	19	19
Tan Wee Kiong (MAS); Goh Wei Shem (MAS)	21	21
3	Danny Bawa Chrisnanta (SIN); Chayut Triyachart (SIN)	16	21	21
2	Chris Langridge (ENG); Peter Mills (ENG)	21	16	19

Final
Tan Wee Kiong (MAS); Goh Wei Shem (MAS)	21	12	21
3	Danny Bawa Chrisnanta (SIN); Chayut Triyachart (SIN)	12	21	15
Third place
1	Chris Adcock (ENG); Andrew Ellis (ENG)	17	17
2	Chris Langridge (ENG); Peter Mills (ENG)	21	21

=== Top half ===
==== Section 1 ====
Round of 64
Gareth Henry (JAM); Garron Palmer (JAM)	21	21
Joseph Matheri Githitu (KEN); Patrick Kinyua Mbogo (KEN)	6	11

Round of 32
1	Chris Adcock (ENG); Andrew Ellis (ENG)	21	21
Douglas Clark (FAI); Ross Stewart (FAI)	7	7
Duane March (SHN); Vernon Smeed (SHN)	6	5
Tony Murphy (NIR); Tony Stephenson (NIR)	21	21
8	Kevin Dennerly-Minturn (NZL); Oliver Leydon-Davis (NZL)	21	21
Edwin Ekiring (UGA); Wilson Tukire (UGA)	10	7
Daniel Font (WAL); Oliver Gwilt (WAL)	21	22
Gareth Henry (JAM); Garron Palmer (JAM)	19	20

Round of 16
1	Chris Adcock (ENG); Andrew Ellis (ENG)	21	21
Tony Murphy (NIR); Tony Stephenson (NIR)	10	13
8	Kevin Dennerly-Minturn (NZL); Oliver Leydon-Davis (NZL)	w/o	w/o	w/o
Daniel Font (WAL); Oliver Gwilt (WAL)	X	X	X

Quarterfinals
1	Chris Adcock (ENG); Andrew Ellis (ENG)	17	21	21
Daniel Font (WAL); Oliver Gwilt (WAL)	21	16	15

==== Section 2 ====
Round of 64
Mark Constable (JER); Alexander Hutchings (JER)	18	14
Tan Wee Kiong (MAS); Goh V Shem (MAS)	21	21

Round of 32
4	Robin Middleton (AUS); Ross Smith (AUS)	21	21
Andre Padmore (BAR); Dakeil Thorpe (BAR)	9	10
Martin Campbell (SCO); Patrick Machugh (SCO)	21	21
Mohamed Ajfan Rasheed (MDV); Nasheeu Sharafuddeen (MDV)	11	7
6	Pranav Chopra (IND); Akshay Dewalkar (IND)	21	21
Sachin Dias (SRI); Buwaneka Goonethilleka (SRI)	10	9
Andrew D'Souza (CAN); Toby Ng (CAN)	18	16
Tan Wee Kiong (MAS); Goh V Shem (MAS)	21	21

Round of 16
4	Robin Middleton (AUS); Ross Smith (AUS)	21	21
Martin Campbell (SCO); Patrick Machugh (SCO)	14	15
6	Pranav Chopra (IND); Akshay Dewalkar (IND)	13	14
Tan Wee Kiong (MAS); Goh V Shem (MAS)	21	21

Quarterfinals
4	Robin Middleton (AUS); Ross Smith (AUS)	17	19
Tan Wee Kiong (MAS); Goh V Shem (MAS)	21	21

=== Bottom half ===
==== Section 3 ====
Round of 64
Ngosa Chongo (ZAM); Chongo Mulenga (ZAM)	22	21	19
Mohamed Sarim (MDV); Hussein Zaki (MDV)	24	19	21

Round of 32
Mohamed Sarim (MDV); Hussein Zaki (MDV)	7	6
Robert Blair (SCO); Paul van Rietvelde (SCO)	21	21
Emmanuel Donkor (GHA); Daniel Sam (GHA)	7	12
5	Adrian Liu (CAN); Derrick Ng (CAN)	21	21
Ryan Benjamin (SHN); Lee Yon (SHN)	3	5
Aatish Lubah (MRI); Julien Paul (MRI)	21	21
Joe Morgan (WAL); Nicolas Strange (WAL)	12	18
3	Danny Bawa Chrisnanta (SIN); Chayut Triyachart (SIN)	21	21

Round of 16
Robert Blair (SCO); Paul van Rietvelde (SCO)	21	21
5	Adrian Liu (CAN); Derrick Ng (CAN)	18	13
Aatish Lubah (MRI); Julien Paul (MRI)	11	7
Danny Bawa Chrisnanta (SIN); Chayut Triyachart (SIN)	21	21

Quarterfinals
Robert Blair (SCO); Paul van Rietvelde (SCO)	8	16
3	Danny Bawa Chrisnanta (SIN); Chayut Triyachart (SIN)	21	21

==== Section 4 ====
Round of 64
Georgie Cupidon (SEY); Steve Malcouzanne (SEY)	21	21
Christoper Eynon (FAI); Dominic Jaffrey (FAI)	13	11

Round of 32
Georgie Cupidon (SEY); Steve Malcouzanne (SEY)	21	21
Stuart Hardy (GUE); Daniel Penney (GUE)	19	9
Mohammed Haque (BAN); Ayman Jaman (BAN)	8	8
7	Raymond Tam (AUS); Glenn Warfe (AUS)	21	21
Daren Liew (MAS); Chan Peng Soon (MAS)	21	21
Richard Cribb (NFI); Michael Donohoe (NFI)	9	10
Andries Malan (RSA); Willem Viljoen (RSA)	11	14
2	Chris Langridge (ENG); Peter Mills (ENG)	21	21

Round of 16
Georgie Cupidon (SEY); Steve Malcouzanne (SEY)	8	15
7	Raymond Tam (AUS); Glenn Warfe (AUS)	21	21
Daren Liew (MAS); Chan Peng Soon (MAS)	19	16
2	Chris Langridge (ENG); Peter Mills (ENG)	21	21

Quarterfinals
7	Raymond Tam (AUS); Glenn Warfe (AUS)	10	11
Chris Langridge (ENG); Peter Mills (ENG)	21	21
