= 1976 European Mixed Team Badminton Championships =

Tournament details
- Dates: 6–7 April 1976
- Edition: 3
- Venue: Fitzwilliam Club
- Location: Dublin, Ireland

The 1976 European Mixed Team Badminton Championships were held in Dublin, Ireland from 6 and 7 April 1976. The tournament was hosted by the European Badminton Union and Badminton Union of Ireland. The tournament was held at the Fitzwilliam Club in Dublin.

== Medalists ==
Event	Gold	Silver	Bronze
Mixed team	Denmark; Flemming Delfs; Elo Hansen; Steen Skovgaard; Lonny Bostofte; Jette Føge; Lene Køppen; Susanne Mølgaard Hansen	England; Ray Stevens; Eddy Sutton; Derek Talbot; Mike Tredgett; Paul Whetnall; Nora Gardner; Barbara Giles; Gillian Gilks; Margaret Lockwood; Susan Whetnall	Sweden; Bengt Fröman; Sture Johnsson; Thomas Kihlström; Claes Nordin; Anette Börjesson; Karin Lindqvist; Eva Stuart

== Draw ==
A total of thirteen teams competed in the championships. Belgium, Switzerland and the Soviet Union made their first appearance in the championships.

Group 1	Group 2	Group 3
Denmark; England; West Germany; Sweden	Netherlands; Scotland; Soviet Union; Wales	Austria; Belgium; Ireland (Host); Norway; Switzerland

== Group 1 ==
Pos	Team	W	L	MF	MA	MD	Pts	Qualification
1	Denmark	2	1	9	6	+3	3	Champions
2	England	2	1	9	6	+3	2	Runners-up
3	Sweden	2	1	7	8	−1	1	Third place
4	West Germany	0	3	5	10	−5	0	Advance to play-offs

=== England vs Sweden ===
England
4
Fitzwilliam Club
6 April 1976

Sweden
1

			1	2	3
1	(England) (Sweden)	Paul Whetnall; Sture Johnsson	4; 15	7; 15
2	(England) (Sweden)	Gillian Gilks; Anette Börjesson	11; 3	11; 3
3	(England) (Sweden)	Ray Stevens / Mike Tredgett; Bengt Fröman / Thomas Kihlström	10; 15	15; 6	15; 10
4	(England) (Sweden)	Nora Gardner / Margaret Lockwood; Anette Börjesson / Eva Stuart	15; 8	15; 4
5	(England) (Sweden)	Derek Talbot / Gillian Gilks; Sture Johnsson / Eva Stuart	15; 10	14; 17	15; 5

=== Denmark vs West Germany ===
Denmark
4
Fitzwilliam Club
6 April 1976

West Germany
1

			1	2	3
1	(Denmark) (West Germany)	Flemming Delfs; Michael Schnaase	15; 9	15; 7
2	(Denmark) (West Germany)	Lene Køppen; Eva-Maria Kranz	11; 5	11; 0
3	(Denmark) (West Germany)	Flemming Delfs / Elo Hansen; Willi Braun / Roland Maywald	15; 12	15; 12
4	(Denmark) (West Germany)	Lonny Bostofte / Jette Føge; Brigitte Steden / Marieluise Zizmann	9; 15	3; 15
5	(Denmark) (West Germany)	Steen Skovgaard / Lene Køppen; Wolfgang Bochow / Marieluise Zizmann	18; 14	11; 15	18; 15

=== England vs West Germany ===
England
3
Fitzwilliam Club
6 April 1976

West Germany
2

			1	2	3
1	(England) (West Germany)	Paul Whetnall; Michael Schnaase	15; 5	15; 4
2	(England) (West Germany)	Gillian Gilks; Eva-Maria Kranz	11; 0	11; 2
3	(England) (West Germany)	Ray Stevens / Mike Tredgett; Willi Braun / Roland Maywald	15; 7	9; 15	7; 15
4	(England) (West Germany)	Nora Gardner / Susan Whetnall; Brigitte Steden / Marieluise Zizmann	18; 14	15; 13
5	(England) (West Germany)	Derek Talbot / Gillian Gilks; Wolfgang Bochow / Marieluise Zizmann	15; 9	11; 15	15; 18

=== Denmark vs Sweden ===
Denmark
2
Fitzwilliam Club
7 April 1976

Sweden
3

			1	2	3
1	(Denmark) (Sweden)	Flemming Delfs; Sture Johnsson	2; 15	6; 15
2	(Denmark) (Sweden)	Lene Køppen; Anette Börjesson	11; 2	11; 3
3	(Denmark) (Sweden)	Flemming Delfs / Elo Hansen; Bengt Fröman / Thomas Kihlström	4; 15	9; 15
4	(Denmark) (Sweden)	Susanne Mølgaard Hansen / Lene Køppen; Anette Börjesson / Eva Stuart	15; 8	15; 8
5	(Denmark) (Sweden)	Steen Skovgaard / Susanne Mølgaard Hansen; Thomas Kihlström / Eva Stuart	8; 15	15; 7	16; 18

=== Sweden vs West Germany ===
Sweden
3
Fitzwilliam Club
7 April 1976

West Germany
2

			1	2	3
1	(Sweden) (West Germany)	Sture Johnsson; Michael Schnaase	15; 2	15; 6
2	(Sweden) (West Germany)	Anette Börjesson; Eva-Maria Kranz	10; 12	11; 6	11; 3
3	(Sweden) (West Germany)	Bengt Fröman / Thomas Kihlström; Willi Braun / Roland Maywald	6; 15	15; 13	18; 15
4	(Sweden) (West Germany)	Anette Börjesson / Eva Stuart; Brigitte Steden / Marieluise Zizmann	14; 17	15; 11	7; 15
5	(Sweden) (West Germany)	Thomas Kihlström / Eva Stuart; Wolfgang Bochow / Marieluise Zizmann	6; 15	7; 15

=== England vs Denmark ===
England
3
Fitzwilliam Club
17 April 1976

Denmark
2

			1	2	3
1	(England) (Denmark)	Paul Whetnall; Flemming Delfs	17; 16	13; 15	6; 15
2	(England) (Denmark)	Gillian Gilks; Lene Køppen	4; 11	10; 12
3	(England) (Denmark)	Ray Stevens / Mike Tredgett; Flemming Delfs / Elo Hansen	12; 15	15; 9	15; 11
4	(England) (Denmark)	Nora Gardner / Susan Whetnall; Lonny Bostofte / Jette Føge	7; 15	2; 15
5	(England) (Denmark)	Derek Talbot / Gillian Gilks; Steen Skovgaard / Lene Køppen	6; 15	9; 15

== Group 2 ==
Pos	Team	W	L	MF	MA	MD	Pts	Qualification
1	Netherlands	3	0	12	3	+9	3	Advance to play-offs
2	Scotland	2	1	8	7	+1	2	
3	Soviet Union	1	2	7	8	−1	1	
4	Wales	0	3	3	12	−9	0	Advance to play-offs

=== Netherlands vs Wales ===
Netherlands
4
Fitzwilliam Club
6 April 1976

Wales
1

			1	2	3
1	(Netherlands) (Wales)	Rob Ridder; Steve Gully	18; 14	15; 6
2	(Netherlands) (Wales)	Joke van Beusekom; Angela Dickson	11; 1	11; 1
3	(Netherlands) (Wales)	Guus de Vogel / Clemens Wortel; David Colmer / Brian Jones	11; 15	11; 15
4	(Netherlands) (Wales)	Marjan Luesken / Joke van Beusekom; Susan Brimble / Angela Dickson	15; 4	15; 4
5	(Netherlands) (Wales)	Rob Ridder / Marjan Luesken; David Colmer / Susan Alfieri	15; 13	15; 4

=== Scotland vs Soviet Union ===
Scotland
3
Fitzwilliam Club
6 April 1976

Soviet Union
2

			1	2	3
1	(Scotland) (Soviet Union)	Ronnie Conway; Anatoliy Skripko	9; 15	8; 15
2	(Scotland) (Soviet Union)	Joanne Flockhart; Alla Zvonareva	12; 11	3; 11	6; 11
3	(Scotland) (Soviet Union)	Jim Ansari / John Britton; Viktor Shvachko / Anatoliy Skripko	15; 5	15; 8
4	(Scotland) (Soviet Union)	Joanne Flockhart / Christine Stewart; Natalya Damaskina / Alla Zvonareva	15; 10	15; 11
5	(Scotland) (Soviet Union)	Fraser Gow / Christine Stewart; Viktor Shvachko / Irina Shevchenko	15; 10	15; 8

=== Netherlands vs Scotland ===
Netherlands
4
Fitzwilliam Club
6 April 1976

Scotland
1

			1	2	3
1	(Netherlands) (Scotland)	Rob Ridder; Ronnie Conway	15; 13	15; 4
2	(Netherlands) (Scotland)	Joke van Beusekom; Pamela Hamilton	11; 3	11; 3
3	(Netherlands) (Scotland)	Rob Ridder / Piet Ridder; Jim Ansari / John Britton	11; 7	11; 6
4	(Netherlands) (Scotland)	Marjan Luesken / Joke van Beusekom; Joanne Flockhart / Christine Stewart	15; 13	12; 15	15; 2
5	(Netherlands) (Scotland)	Clemens Wortel / Marjan Luesken; Fraser Gow / Christine Stewart	15; 12	10; 15	1; 15

=== Wales vs Soviet Union ===
Wales
1
Fitzwilliam Club
7 April 1976

Soviet Union
4

			1	2	3
1	(Wales) (Soviet Union)	Steve Gully; Anatoliy Skripko	11; 15	9; 15
2	(Wales) (Soviet Union)	Angela Dickson; Alla Zvonareva	3; 11	2; 11
3	(Wales) (Soviet Union)	David Colmer / Brian Jones; Viktor Shvachko / Anatoliy Skripko	15; 7	5; 15	3; 15
4	(Wales) (Soviet Union)	Susan Brimble / Angela Dickson; Natalya Damaskina / Alla Zvonareva	3; 15	6; 15
5	(Wales) (Soviet Union)	David Colmer / Susan Alfieri; Viktor Shvachko / Irina Shevchenko	15; 12	15; 8

=== Netherlands vs Soviet Union ===
Netherlands
4
Fitzwilliam Club
7 April 1976

Soviet Union
1

			1	2	3
1	(Netherlands) (Soviet Union)	Clemens Wortel; Anatoliy Skripko	8; 15	12; 15
2	(Netherlands) (Soviet Union)	Joke van Beusekom; Alla Zvonareva	11; 6	7; 11	11; 6
3	(Netherlands) (Soviet Union)	Piet Ridder / Rob Ridder; Viktor Shvachko / Anatoliy Skripko	15; 12	18; 13
4	(Netherlands) (Soviet Union)	Marjan Luesken / Joke van Beusekom; Nadezhda Litvincheva / Irina Shevchenko	15; 4	15; 4
5	(Netherlands) (Soviet Union)	Rob Ridder / Marjan Luesken; Viktor Shvachko / Irina Shevchenko	15; 8	15; 7

=== Scotland vs Wales ===
Scotland
5
Fitzwilliam Club
7 April 1976

Wales
0

			1	2	3
1	(Scotland) (Wales)	Ronnie Conway; Steve Gully	15; 2	15; 9
2	(Scotland) (Wales)	Joanne Flockhart; Susan Brimble	11; 2	11; 1
3	(Scotland) (Wales)	Jim Ansari / Billy Gilliland; David Colmer / Brian Jones	15; 8	15; 8
4	(Scotland) (Wales)	Joanne Flockhart / Christine Stewart; Susan Alfieri / Angela Dickson	15; 12	15; 8
5	(Scotland) (Wales)	Fraser Gow / Christine Stewart; Brian Jones / Susan Alfieri	12; 15	15; 10	3; 15

== Group 3 ==
Pos	Team	W	L	MF	MA	MD	Pts	Qualification
1	Ireland (H)	4	0	18	2	+16	4	Advance to play-offs
2	Norway	3	1	16	4	+12	3	
3	Austria	2	2	10	10	0	2	
4	Switzerland	1	3	5	15	−10	1	
5	Belgium	0	3	1	19	−18	0	

=== Fixtures ===
Team 1	Score	Team 2
Ireland	5–0	Austria
Norway	5–0	Belgium
Ireland	5–0	Belgium
Austria	4–1	Switzerland
Norway	5–0	Switzerland
Ireland	3–2	Norway
Austria	5–0	Belgium
Norway	4–1	Austria
Ireland	3–2	Switzerland
Switzerland	4–1	Belgium

== Inter-divisional play-offs ==
=== West Germany vs Netherlands ===
West Germany
2
Fitzwilliam Club
7 April 1976

Netherlands
3

			1	2	3
1	(West Germany) (Netherlands)	Michael Schnaase; Rob Ridder	15; 10	15; 12
2	(West Germany) (Netherlands)	Eva-Maria Kranz; Joke van Beusekom	11; 5	2; 11	2; 11
3	(West Germany) (Netherlands)	Willi Braun / Roland Maywald; Guus de Vogel / Clemens Wortel	15; 1	15; 5
4	(West Germany) (Netherlands)	Brigitte Steden / Marieluise Zizmann; Marjan Luesken / Joke van Beusekom	15; 8	16; 17	12; 15
5	(West Germany) (Netherlands)	Wolfgang Bochow / Marieluise Zizmann; Rob Ridder / Marjan Luesken	8; 15	7; 15

=== Wales vs Ireland ===
Wales
1
Fitzwilliam Club
7 April 1976

Ireland
4

			1	2	3
1	(Wales) (Republic of Ireland)	Steve Gully; John Taylor	15; 10	15; 9
2	(Wales) (Republic of Ireland)	Susan Brimble; Barbara Beckett	5; 11	3; 11
3	(Wales) (Republic of Ireland)	David Colmer / Brian Jones; Peter Moore / Bill Thompson	15; 6	13; 15	13; 15
4	(Wales) (Republic of Ireland)	Susan Alfieri / Angela Dickson; Barbara Beckett / Dorothy Cunningham	2; 15	10; 15
5	(Wales) (Republic of Ireland)	Brian Jones / Susan Alfieri; John Scott / Dorothy Cunningham	12; 15	6; 15
