= 1974 European Mixed Team Badminton Championships =

Tournament details
- Dates: 16–17 April 1974
- Edition: 2
- Venue: Stadthalle
- Location: Vienna, Austria

The 1974 European Mixed Team Badminton Championships were held in Vienna, Austria from 16 and 17 April 1974, two days prior to the individual championships. The tournament was hosted by the European Badminton Union and Österreichischer Badminton Verband. The tournament was held at the Stadthalle in Vienna.

== Medalists ==
Event	Gold	Silver	Bronze
Mixed team	England; Ray Stevens; Elliot Stuart; Derek Talbot; Mike Tredgett; Paul Whetnall; Margaret Beck; Nora Gardner; Barbara Giles; Gillian Gilks; Susan Whetnall	Denmark; Flemming Delfs; Elo Hansen; Poul Petersen; Svend Pri; Steen Skovgaard; Anne Flindt; Pernille Kaagaard; Lene Køppen; Ulla Strand	Sweden; Bengt Fröman; Sture Johnsson; Thomas Kihlström; Claes Nordin; Anette Börjesson; Karin Lindqvist; Eva Stuart

== Draw ==
A total of thirteen teams competed in the championships. Norway made their first ever appearance in the championships.

Group 1	Group 2
Denmark; England; West Germany; Netherlands; Sweden	Austria (Host); Czechoslovakia; Finland; Ireland; Norway; Scotland; Wales; Yugoslavia

== Group 1 ==
Pos	Team	W	L	MF	MA	MD	Pts
1	England	4	0	18	2	+16	4
2	Denmark	2	2	12	8	+4	3
3	Sweden	2	2	9	11	−2	2
4	West Germany	2	2	8	12	−4	1
5	Netherlands	0	4	3	17	−14	0

=== England vs Netherlands ===
England
5
Stadthalle
16 April 1974

Netherlands
0

			1	2	3
1	(England) (Netherlands)	Derek Talbot; Clemens Wortel	15; 4	15; 12
2	(England) (Netherlands)	Margaret Beck; Joke van Beusekom	11; 5	11; 4
3	(England) (Netherlands)	Ray Stevens / Mike Tredgett; Boudewijn Ridder / Rob Ridder	15; 6	15; 7
4	(England) (Netherlands)	Margaret Beck / Gillian Gilks; Marjan Luesken / Joke van Beusekom	4; 15	18; 14	15; 11
5	(England) (Netherlands)	David Eddy / Gillian Gilks; Rob Ridder / Marja Ridder	17; 15	15; 13

=== Denmark vs Sweden ===
Denmark
4
Stadthalle
16 April 1974

Sweden
1

			1	2	3
1	(Denmark) (Sweden)	Svend Pri; Sture Johnsson	17; 15	15; 7
2	(Denmark) (Sweden)	Lene Køppen; Eva Stuart	7; 11	6; 11
3	(Denmark) (Sweden)	Poul Petersen / Svend Pri; Bengt Fröman / Thomas Kihlström	15; 7	11; 15	7; 6	retired
4	(Denmark) (Sweden)	Anne Flindt / Pernille Kaagaard; Anette Börjesson / Karin Lindqvist	15; 7	15; 6
5	(Denmark) (Sweden)	Elo Hansen / Ulla Strand; Gert Perneklo / Eva Stuart	15; 8	15; 4

=== West Germany vs Netherlands ===
West Germany
3
Stadthalle
16 April 1974

Netherlands
2

			1	2	3
1	(West Germany) (Netherlands)	Wolfgang Bochow; Clemens Wortel	15; 7	15; 9
2	(West Germany) (Netherlands)	Irmgard Gerlatzka; Joke van Beusekom	8; 11	5; 11
3	(West Germany) (Netherlands)	Willi Braun / Roland Maywald; Boudewijn Ridder / Rob Ridder	15; 6	15; 8
4	(West Germany) (Netherlands)	Brigitte Steden / Marieluise Zizmann; Marjan Luesken / Joke van Beusekom	9; 15	18; 17	12; 15
5	(West Germany) (Netherlands)	Roland Maywald / Brigitte Steden; Rob Ridder / Marja Ridder	15; 7	15; 7

=== Denmark vs West Germany ===
Denmark
2
Stadthalle
16 April 1974

West Germany
3

			1	2	3
1	(Denmark) (West Germany)	Svend Pri; Wolfgang Bochow	5; 15	15; 5	12; 15
2	(Denmark) (West Germany)	Lene Køppen; Brigitte Steden	11; 1	9; 11	12; 9
3	(Denmark) (West Germany)	Flemming Delfs / Elo Hansen; Willi Braun / Roland Maywald	15; 3	15; 11
4	(Denmark) (West Germany)	Anne Flindt / Pernille Kaagaard; Brigitte Steden / Marieluise Zizmann	5; 15	14; 17
5	(Denmark) (West Germany)	Elo Hansen / Ulla Strand; Wolfgang Bochow / Marieluise Zizmann	15; 8	17; 18	7; 15

=== England vs Sweden ===
England
4
Stadthalle
16 April 1974

Sweden
1

			1	2	3
1	(England) (Sweden)	Paul Whetnall; Sture Johnsson	10; 15	10; 15
2	(England) (Sweden)	Gillian Gilks; Eva Stuart	8; 2	5; 4
3	(England) (Sweden)	Elliot Stuart / Derek Talbot; Bengt Fröman / Claes Nordin	15; 3	17; 15
4	(England) (Sweden)	Nora Gardner / Susan Whetnall; Anette Börjesson / Karin Lindqvist	15; 2	15; 5
5	(England) (Sweden)	Derek Talbot / Gillian Gilks; Sture Johnsson / Eva Stuart	15; 5	18; 16

=== England vs West Germany ===
England
5
Stadthalle
17 April 1974

West Germany
0

			1	2	3
1	(England) (West Germany)	Paul Whetnall; Wolfgang Bochow	15; 8	18; 15
2	(England) (West Germany)	Margaret Beck; Brigitte Steden	11; 5	11; 3
3	(England) (West Germany)	Ray Stevens / Mike Tredgett; Willi Braun / Roland Maywald	15; 9	17; 14
4	(England) (West Germany)	Margaret Beck / Gillian Gilks; Brigitte Steden / Marieluise Zizmann	15; 6	15; 9
5	(England) (West Germany)	Derek Talbot / Gillian Gilks; Wolfgang Bochow / Marieluise Zizmann	5; 15	15; 5	15; 10

=== Denmark vs Netherlands ===
Denmark
5
Stadthalle
17 April 1974

Netherlands
0

			1	2	3
1	(Denmark) (Netherlands)	Flemming Delfs; Clemens Wortel	15; 4	15; 9
2	(Denmark) (Netherlands)	Lene Køppen; Marjan Luesken	11; 5	11; 0
3	(Denmark) (Netherlands)	Poul Petersen / Svend Pri; Guus de Vogel / Guus van der Vlugt	15; 5	15; 1
4	(Denmark) (Netherlands)	Pernille Kaagaard / Ulla Strand; Marjan Luesken / Joke van Beusekom	15; 9	17; 15
5	(Denmark) (Netherlands)	Elo Hansen / Ulla Strand; Rob Ridder / Marja Ridder	15; 4	15; 11

=== Sweden vs Netherlands ===
Sweden
4
Stadthalle
17 April 1974

Netherlands
1

			1	2	3
1	(Sweden) (Netherlands)	Sture Johnsson; Clemens Wortel	15; 7	15; 13
2	(Sweden) (Netherlands)	Eva Stuart; Joke van Beusekom	10; 12	11; 3	11; 0
3	(Sweden) (Netherlands)	Bengt Fröman / Thomas Kihlström; Fraser Gow / Robert S. McCoig	15; 5	15; 9
4	(Sweden) (Netherlands)	Anette Börjesson / Karin Lindqvist; Marjan Luesken / Joke van Beusekom	2; 15	5; 15
5	(Sweden) (Netherlands)	Thomas Kihlström / Eva Stuart; Fraser Gow / Christine Stewart	15; 6	15; 3

=== England vs Denmark ===
England
4
Stadthalle
17 April 1974

Denmark
1

			1	2	3
1	(England) (Denmark)	Ray Stevens; Svend Pri	15; 8	2; 15	13; 15
2	(England) (Denmark)	Gillian Gilks; Lene Køppen	7; 11	12; 11	11; 8
3	(England) (Denmark)	Elliot Stuart / Derek Talbot; Flemming Delfs / Elo Hansen	7; 15	15; 2	17; 14
4	(England) (Denmark)	Margaret Beck / Gillian Gilks; Anne Flindt / Pernille Kaagaard	16; 18	15; 3	15; 9
5	(England) (Denmark)	Derek Talbot / Susan Whetnall; Elo Hansen / Ulla Strand	16; 18	15; 10	15; 4

=== Sweden vs West Germany ===
Sweden
3
Stadthalle
17 April 1974

West Germany
2

			1	2	3
1	(Sweden) (West Germany)	Sture Johnsson; Gerhard Kucki	15; 0	15; 6
2	(Sweden) (West Germany)	Eva Stuart; Brigitte Steden	11; 6	9; 11	11; 8
3	(Sweden) (West Germany)	Bengt Fröman / Thomas Kihlström; Willi Braun / Roland Maywald	12; 15	6; 15
4	(Sweden) (West Germany)	Anette Börjesson / Karin Lindqvist; Brigitte Steden / Marieluise Zizmann	5; 15	3; 15
5	(Sweden) (West Germany)	Thomas Kihlström / Eva Stuart; Wolfgang Bochow / Marieluise Zizmann	15; 11	10; 15	15; 11

== Group 2 ==
=== Preliminary stage ===
==== Section A ====
Section semi-finals
Scotland	3
Norway	2
Wales	3
Austria	2

Section final
Scotland	5
Wales	0
Third place in section
Norway	4
Austria	1

Standings
Pos	Team
1	Scotland
2	Wales
3	Norway
4	Austria (H)

==== Section B ====
Section semi-finals
Czechoslovakia	4
Finland	1
Yugoslavia	2
Ireland	3

Section final
Czechoslovakia	4
Ireland	1
Third place in section
Finland	0
Yugoslavia	5

Standings
Pos	Team
1	Czechoslovakia
2	Ireland
3	Yugoslavia
4	Finland

=== Play-offs ===
==== 6th to 9th place ====
6th–9th place
A1	Scotland	4
B2	Ireland	1
A2	Wales	3
B1	Czechoslovakia	2

6th place
A1	Scotland	5
A2	Wales	0
8th place
B2	Ireland	3
B1	Czechoslovakia	2

===== Scotland vs Ireland =====
Scotland
4
Stadthalle
17 April 1974

Ireland
1

			1	2	3
1	(Scotland) (Republic of Ireland)	Robert S. McCoig; John Taylor	15; 2	18; 16
2	(Scotland) (Republic of Ireland)	Anne Johnstone; Barbara Beckett	2; 11	11; 9	2; 11
3	(Scotland) (Republic of Ireland)	Jim Ansari / John Britton; David Doherty / John Taylor	18; 10	15; 7
4	(Scotland) (Republic of Ireland)	Hellen McIntosh / Christine Stewart; Barbara Beckett / Mary Bryan	15; 13	15; 5
5	(Scotland) (Republic of Ireland)	Fraser Gow / Christine Stewart; David Doherty / Mary Bryan	15; 4	15; 7

===== Czechoslovakia vs Wales =====
Czechoslovakia
2
Stadthalle
17 April 1974

Wales
3

			1	2	3
1	(Czechoslovakia) (Wales)	Petr Lacina; Steve Gully	15; 2	15; 3
2	(Czechoslovakia) (Wales)	Alena Poboráková; Angela Dickson	11; 3	11; 2
3	(Czechoslovakia) (Wales)	Petr Lacina / Ladislav Šrámek; David Colmer / Brian Jones	9; 15	1; 15
4	(Czechoslovakia) (Wales)	Jaroslava Krahulcová / Alena Poboráková; Susan Alfieri / Angela Dickson	11; 15	14; 18
5	(Czechoslovakia) (Wales)	Ladislav Šrámek / Jaroslava Krahulcová; Brian Jones / Susan Brimble	12; 15	12; 15

===== Scotland vs Wales =====
Scotland
5
Stadthalle
17 April 1974

Wales
0

			1	2	3
1	(Scotland) (Wales)	Robert S. McCoig; Steve Gully	15; 5	15; 5
2	(Scotland) (Wales)	Anne Johnstone; Angela Dickson	11; 5	11; 2
3	(Scotland) (Wales)	Jim Ansari / John Britton; David Colmer / Brian Jones	18; 17	15; 12
4	(Scotland) (Wales)	Hellen McIntosh / Christine Stewart; Susan Alfieri / Angela Dickson	15; 13	15; 13
5	(Scotland) (Wales)	Fraser Gow / Christine Stewart; Brian Jones / Susan Alfieri	15; 7	15; 3

===== Ireland vs Czechoslovakia =====
Ireland
3
Stadthalle
17 April 1974

Czechoslovakia
2

			1	2	3
1	(Republic of Ireland) (Czechoslovakia)	John Taylor; Petr Lacina	8; 15	5; 15
2	(Republic of Ireland) (Czechoslovakia)	Barbara Beckett; Alena Poboráková	11; 5	11; 3
3	(Republic of Ireland) (Czechoslovakia)	John Taylor / David Doherty; Petr Lacina / Ladislav Šrámek	15; 6	15; 10
4	(Republic of Ireland) (Czechoslovakia)	Barbara Beckett / Mary Bryan; Jaroslava Krahulcová / Alena Poboráková	15; 11	15; 12
5	(Republic of Ireland) (Czechoslovakia)	David Doherty / Mary Bryan; Ladislav Šrámek / Jaroslava Krahulcová	11; 15	15; 7	9; 15

==== 10th to 13th place ====
10th–13th place
A3	Norway	5
B4	Finland	0
A4	Austria	2
B3	Yugoslavia	3

10th place
A3	Norway	3
B3	Yugoslavia	2
12th place
B4	Finland	2
A4	Austria	3

===== Norway vs Finland =====
Norway
5
Stadthalle
17 April 1974

Finland
0

			1	2	3
1	(Norway) (Finland)	Knut Engebretsen; Carl-Johan Nybergh	15; 11	15; 11
2	(Norway) (Finland)	Kari Histøl; Sylvi Jormanainen	11; 3	11; 1
3	(Norway) (Finland)	Haakon Ringdal / Hans Sperre; Jouko Degerth / Lars-Henrik Nybergh	4; 15	15; 10	15; 7
4	(Norway) (Finland)	Bodil Aabol / Inger Mette Olsen; Maarit Jaakkola / Sylvi Jormanainen	17; 14	13; 18	15; 10
5	(Norway) (Finland)	Hans Sperre / Kari Histøl; Jouko Degerth / Maarit Jaakkola	15; 4	15; 9

===== Austria vs Yugoslavia =====
Austria
2
Stadthalle
17 April 1974

Yugoslavia
3

			1	2	3
1	(Austria) (Socialist Federal Republic of Yugoslavia)	Alfred Hofer; Jani Čaleta	15; 8	15; 5
2	(Austria) (Socialist Federal Republic of Yugoslavia)	Brigitte Reichmann; Lučka Križman	3; 11	6; 11
3	(Austria) (Socialist Federal Republic of Yugoslavia)	Hermann Fröhlich / Reinhold Pum; Gregor Berden / Stane Koprivšek	11; 15	11; 15
4	(Austria) (Socialist Federal Republic of Yugoslavia)	Brigitte Reichmann / Elisabeth Schechtner; Vita Bohinc / Lučka Križman	12; 15	5; 15
5	(Austria) (Socialist Federal Republic of Yugoslavia)	Hermann Fröhlich / Lore König; Stane Koprivšek / Marta Amf	15; 5	15; 3

===== Norway vs Yugoslavia =====
Norway
3
Stadthalle
17 April 1974

Yugoslavia
2

			1	2	3
1	(Norway) (Socialist Federal Republic of Yugoslavia)	Knut Engebretsen; Jani Čaleta	15; 1	15; 6
2	(Norway) (Socialist Federal Republic of Yugoslavia)	Kari Histøl; Vita Bohinc	11; 3	11; 1
3	(Norway) (Socialist Federal Republic of Yugoslavia)	Haakon Ringdal / Hans Sperre; Gregor Berden / Stane Koprivšek	8; 15	15; 10	9; 15
4	(Norway) (Socialist Federal Republic of Yugoslavia)	Bodil Aabol / Inger Mette Olsen; Marta Amf / Lučka Križman	4; 15	2; 15
5	(Norway) (Socialist Federal Republic of Yugoslavia)	Hans Sperre / Kari Histøl; Gregor Berden / Lučka Križman	15; 9	15; 8

===== Austria vs Finland =====
Austria
3
Stadthalle
17 April 1974

Finland
2

			1	2	3
1	(Austria) (Finland)	Alfred Hofer; Carl-Johan Nybergh	15; 5	15; 4
2	(Austria) (Finland)	Brigitte Reichmann; Sylvi Jormanainen	11; 7	10; 12	5; 11
3	(Austria) (Finland)	Hermann Fröhlich / Reinhold Pum; Jouko Degerth / Carl-Johan Nybergh	12; 12	6; 8
4	(Austria) (Finland)	Brigitte Reichmann / Elisabeth Schechtner; Maarit Jaakkola / Sylvi Jormanainen	15; 7	15; 12
5	(Austria) (Finland)	Hermann Fröhlich / Lore König; Jouko Degerth / Maarit Jaakkola	8; 15	9; 15
