= Welsh National Badminton Championships =

Badminton event

The Welsh National Badminton Championships is an annual tournament to crown the champion badminton players in Wales. The tournament started in 1938 with the mixed doubles event. The Championships are organised by Badminton Wales (formerly the Welsh Badminton Union) and are restricted to Welsh players.

It is not to be confused with the Welsh International, which is open to players outside of Wales.

In 2023 Daniel Font broke the seven men's singles win record held by Howard Jennings and Richard Vaughan and has extended it to ten after winning in 2025. Angela Dickson (née Davies) won the women's singles a record 16 times between 1962 and 1979.

== Past winners ==
Year	Men's singles	Women's singles	Men's doubles	Women's doubles	Mixed doubles
1938	no competition	no competition	no competition	no competition	F.P.Griffiths; W.Griffiths
1939	no competition	no competition	no competition	no competition	F.P.Griffiths; W.Griffiths
1953	no competition	no competition	no competition	no competition	J.C.Morgan; H.Tomlin
1954	no competition	no competition	no competition	no competition	J.H.Evans; M.Anderson
1956	no competition	no competition	no competition	no competition	Barry E. Fletcher; E.Whitehead
1957	no competition	no competition	no competition	no competition	J.C.Morgan; H.H.Anderson
1958	no competition	no competition	no competition	no competition	J.R.C.Weber; P.Saunders
1959	no competition	no competition	no competition	no competition	J.C.Morgan; M.Perkins
1960	no competition	no competition	J.C.Morgan; G.E.Rowlands	C.Davies; E.G.Davies	J.C.Morgan; C.Davies
1961	G.E.Rowlands	J.Warwick	J. C. Morgan; G. E. Rowlands	K. Samuel; E. G. Davies	G. E. Rowlands; E. G. Davies
1962	G.E.Rowlands	Angela Davies	Gordon Stuart Dickson; G. E. Rowlands	Angela Davies; H. H. Anderson	Gordon Stuart Dickson; Angela Davies
1963	M. Anis	Angela Davies	Peter Seaman; Howard Jennings	Angela Davies; H.H.Anderson	Peter Seaman; Muriel Withers
1964	Peter Seaman	Angela Davies	Peter Seaman; Howard Jennings	J.Stewart; Betty Fisher	Peter Seaman; Muriel Withers
1965	G.E.Rowlands	Angela Davies	Peter Seaman; Howard Jennings	Angela Davies; A. Roberts	Peter Seaman; Muriel Withers
1966	G.E.Rowlands	Angela Dickson	Peter Seaman; Howard Jennings	Muriel Withers; Betty Fisher	Howard Jennings; Angela Dickson
1967	Peter Seaman	Angela Dickson	John Hartstill; Dave Colmer	Muriel Withers; Betty Fisher	Howard Jennings; Angela Dickson
1968	G.S.R.Tan	Angela Dickson	Peter Seaman; Howard Jennings	Muriel Withers; Betty Fisher	Peter Seaman; Betty Fisher
1969	Howard Jennings	Angela Dickson	Peter Seaman; Howard Jennings	Muriel Withers; Betty Fisher	Howard Jennings; Angela Dickson
1970	Howard Jennings	Angela Dickson	Alan Fisher; Howard Jennings	Muriel Witherss; Betty Fisher	Howard Jennings; Angela Dickson
1971	Howard Jennings	Angela Dickson	Alan Fisher; Howard Jennings	Angela Dickson; Pamela Jeremiah	Dave Colmer; Pamela Jeremiah
1972	Howard Jennings	Angela Dickson	Alan Fisher; Howard Jennings	Angela Dickson; Pamela Jeremiah	Alan Fisher; Betty Fisher
1974	Howard Jennings	Angela Dickson	Alan Fisher; Howard Jennings	Angela Dickson; Sue Brimble	Brian Jones; Sue Alfieri
1975	Howard Jennings	Angela Dickson	Brian Jones; Dave Colmer	Angela Dickson; Betty Fisher	Brian Jones; Sue Alfieri
1976	Steve Gully	Angela Dickson	Brian Jones; Dave Colmer	Angela Dickson; Sue Brimble	Howard Jennings; Angela Dickson
1977	Howard Jennings	Sue Brimble	Brian Jones; Dave Colmer	Sue Brimble; Linda Blake	Brian Jones; Sue Alfieri
1978	Yim Chong Lim	Angela Dickson	Brian Jones; Dave Colmer	Sue Brimble; Linda Blake	Brian Jones; Angela Dickson
1979	Yim Chong Lim	Angela Dickson	Brian Jones; Dave Colmer	Sue Brimble; Linda Blake	Brian Jones; Angela Dickson
1980	Phil Sutton	Sian Williams	Richard Eastwood; Phil Sutton	Sue Brimble; Linda Blake	Brian Jones; Angela Dickson
1981	Phil Sutton	Sian Williams	Chris Rees; Lyndon Williams	Angela Nelson; Sian Williams	Yim Chong Lim; Linda Blake
1982	Phil Sutton	Angela Nelson	Chris Rees; Lyndon Williams	Angela Nelson; Sian Williams	Yim Chong Lim; Linda Blake
1983	Phil Sutton	Sian Williams	Chris Rees; Lyndon Williams	Angela Nelson; Sian Williams	Yim Chong Lim; Linda Blake
1984	Phil Sutton	Angela Nelson	Chris Rees; Lyndon Williams	Angela Nelson; Sian Williams	Lyndon Williams; Sarah Doody
1985	Phil Sutton	Sian Williams	Chris Rees; Lyndon Williams	Linda Blake; Lesley Roberts	Lyndon Williams; Sarah Doody
1986	Chris Rees	Lesley Roberts	Chris Rees; Lyndon Williams	Sarah Doody; Lesley Roberts	Andrew Spencer; Lesley Roberts
1987	Chris Rees	Rachel McIntosh	Chris Rees; Lyndon Williams	Sarah Doody; Cathy Vigar	Andrew Spencer; Lesley Roberts
1988	Chris Rees	Gail Davies	Chris Rees; Lyndon Williams	Sarah Doody; Caroline Watson	Phil Sutton; Sarah Doody
1989	Chris Rees	Gail Davies	Chris Rees; Yim Chong Lim	Sarah Doody; Gail Davies	Chris Rees; Sarah Doody
1990	Andrew Spencer	Rachele Edwards	Andrew Spencer; Lyndon Williams	Caroline Grice; Cathy Vigar	Phil Sutton; Caroline Grice
1991	Andrew Spencer	Rachele Edwards	Andrew Spencer; Lyndon Williams	Sian Williams; Hilary Tarleton	Andrew Carlotti; Hilary Tarleton
1992	Mark Richards	Kelly Morgan	Chris Rees; Lyndon Williams	Kelly Morgan; Rachael Phipps	Chris Rees; Lisa Carpenter
1993	Geraint Lewis	Kelly Morgan	Chris Rees; Lyndon Williams	Rachele Edwards; Hilary Tarleton	Chris Rees; Hilary Tarleton
1994	John Leung	Kelly Morgan	Andrew Spencer; David Tonks	Kelly Morgan; Rachael Phipps	Andrew Burke; Sarah Williams
1995	Richard Vaughan	Kelly Morgan	Chris Rees; Lyndon Williams	Kelly Morgan; Rachael Phipps	Andrew Burke; Sarah Williams
1996	Richard Vaughan	Kelly Morgan	Andrew Burke; Geraint Lewis	Kelly Morgan; Rachael Phipps	Richard Vaughan; Kelly Morgan
1997	Richard Vaughan	Kelly Morgan	Andrew Burke; Geraint Lewis	Kelly Morgan; Rachael Phipps	Richard Vaughan; Kelly Morgan
1998	John Leung	Kelly Morgan	Andrew Burke; Geraint Lewis	Gail Osborne; Katy Howell	John Leung; Katy Howell
1999	Richard Vaughan	Kelly Morgan	Chris Rees; Neil Cottrill	Kelly Morgan; Rachelle Morgan	Richard Vaughan; Kelly Morgan
2000	Richard Vaughan	Kelly Morgan	Chris Rees; Neil Cottrill	Jo Muggeridge; Felicity Gallup	Richard Vaughan; Kelly Morgan
2001	Richard Vaughan	Kelly Morgan	Chris Rees; Neil Cottrill	Jo Muggeridge; Felicity Gallup	Neil Cottrill; Jo Muggeridge
2002	Richard Vaughan	Kelly Morgan	Chris Rees; Neil Cottrill	Jo Muggeridge; Felicity Gallup	Neil Cottrill; Jo Muggeridge
2003	Irwansyah	Kelly Morgan	Matthew Hughes; Martyn Lewis	Jo Muggeridge; Felicity Gallup	Matthew Hughes; Jo Muggeridge
2004	Irwansyah	Kelly Morgan	Chris Rees; Irwansyah	Jo Muggeridge; Felicity Gallup	Matthew Hughes; Jo Muggeridge
2005	Paul Le Tocq	Harriet Johnson	Matthew Hughes; Martyn Lewis	Robyn Ashworth; Harriet Johnson	Matthew Hughes; Jo Muggeridge
2006	Martyn Lewis	Harriet Johnson	Matthew Hughes; Martyn Lewis	Jo Muggeridge; Rachele Phillip	Paul Le Tocq; Kate Ridler
2007	Raj Popat	Rachele Phillips	Matthew Hughes; Martyn Lewis	Jo Muggeridge; Rachele Phillip	Matthew Sprake; Jo Muggeridge
2008	Martyn Lewis	Caroline Harvey	Matthew Hughes; Martyn Lewis	Vikki Jones; Nicole Walkley	James Phillips; Katy Howell
2009	James Van Hooijdonk	Sarah Thomas	Matthew Hughes; Martyn Lewis	Caroline Harvey; Kerry Ann Sheppard	Martyn Lewis; Vikki Jones
2010	Irwansyah	Sarah Thomas	Joe Morgan; James Phillips	Caroline Harvey; Carissa Turner	Richard Vaughan; Sarah Thomas
2011	Daniel Font	Sarah Thomas	Matthew Hughes; Martyn Lewis	Bethan Higginson; Vikki Jones	Joe Morgan; Jo Sullivan
2012	Raj Popat	Sarah Thomas	James Phillips; Nic Strange	Sarah Thomas; Carissa Turner	James Phillips; Jordan Hart
2013	Chris Pickard	Carissa Turner	Joe Morgan; Nic Strange	Sarah Thomas; Carissa Turner	Oliver Gwilt; Sarah Thomas
2014	Daniel Font	Carissa Turner	Daniel Font; Oliver Gwilt	Sarah Thomas; Carissa Turner	Daniel Font; Sarah Thomas
2015	Daniel Font	Carissa Turner	Joe Morgan; Daniel Font	Sarah Thomas; Carissa Turner	Oliver Gwilt; Emilie Gwilt
2016	William Kitching	Jordan Hart	Nic Strange; Joe Morgan	Sarah Thomas; Carissa Turner	Martyn Lewis; Ellen Mahenthralingham
2017	William Kitching	Jordan Hart	Nic Strange; Scott Oates	Sarah Thomas; Carissa Turner	Tsung Fong Mo; Gean Sou Mo
2018	Daniel Font	Jordan Hart	Daniel Font; Oliver Gwilt	Gean Sou Mos; Carissa Turner	Tsung Fong Mo; Gean Sou Mo
2019	Daniel Font	Jordan Hart	Daniel Font; Oliver Gwilt	Aimee Whiteman; Carissa Turner	William Kitching; Carissa Turner
2020	William Kitching	Jordan Hart	Martyn Lewis; James Phillips	Jordan Hart; Lowri Hart	Phillip Eastwood; Sammy Hutt
2021	Daniel Font	Aimee Whiteman	Martyn Lewis; Scott Oates	Aimee Whiteman; Devi Permatasari	Will Ktching; Saffron Morris
2022	Daniel Font	Aimie Whiteman	Andrew Oates; Nic Strange	Aimie Whitema; Devi Permatasari	Adil Khan; Devi Permatasari
2023	Daniel Font	Jordan Hart	Daniel Font; William Kitching	Aimie Whiteman; Devi Permatasari	Andrew Oates; Saffron Morris
2024	Daniel Font	Isha Mekala	Andrew Oates; Daniel Font	Aimie Whiteman; Saffron Morris	Andrew Oates; Saffron Morris
2025	Daniel Font	Isha Mekala	Daniel Font; Andrew Oates	Saffron Morris; Aimee Whiteman	Andrew Oates; Saffron Morris
2026	Harper Leigh	Isha Mekala	Andrew Oates; Scott Oates	Isha Mekala; Aimie Whiteman	Andrew Oates; Saffron Morris
