= Linda Blake =

Welsh international badminton player

Personal information
- Nationality: British (Welsh)

Sport
- Sport: Badminton
- Club: Penarth Badminton Club
Medal record
Representing Wales
Welsh Nationals
Gold medal – first place	1977–1980, 1985	women's doubles
Gold medal – first place	1981–1983	mixed doubles

Linda Blake is a former international badminton player from Wales who competed at the Commonwealth Games and is an eight-times champion of Wales.

== Biography ==
Blake from Penarth near Cardiff, was a member of the Penarth Badminton Club and represented Wales at international level.

Blake specialised in doubles play and her mixed doubles partners included Brian Jones, Phil Sutton and Yim Chong Lim. Her women's doubles partners included Sue Brimble and Lesley Roberts.

Blake represented the Welsh team at the 1978 Commonwealth Games in Edmonton, Canada, where she competed in the badminton events.

Blake was an eight-times champion of Wales at the Welsh National Badminton Championships, winning the women's doubles in 1977, 1978, 1979, 1980 and 1985 and the mixed doubles in 1981, 1982 and 1983.
