= Andrew Groves-Burke =

Welsh international badminton player

Andrew Groves-Burke né Burke
Personal information
- Nationality: British (Welsh)
- Born: c.1967 Cardiff, Wales

Sport
- Sport: Badminton
Medal record
Representing Wales
Welsh Nationals
| Gold medal – first place | 1996–1998 | men's doubles |
| Gold medal – first place | 1994–1995 | mixed doubles |

Andrew J. Groves-Burke né Burke (born c.1967) is a former international badminton player from Wales who competed at the Commonwealth Games and is a five-times champion of Wales.

== Biography ==
Born in 1967 as Andrew Burke he played out of Cardiff and represented Wales at international level He was a five-times champion of Wales at the Welsh National Badminton Championships, winning the mixed doubles with Sarah William in 1994 and 1995 and the men's doubles with Geraint Lewis in 1996, 1997 and 1998.

In 1995 he married Natasha Groves and would later play under the name of Groves-Burke. His sister-in-law Tanya Woodward was an English international player.

At the end of 1996 he was ranked Welsh number 1 in both men's doubles and mixed doubles, with partners Geraint Lewis and Sarah Williams respectively.

Groves-Burke represented the Welsh team at the 1998 Commonwealth Games in Kuala Lumpur, Malaysia, where he competed in the doubles, mixed and team events.

He helped the Welsh Badminton Union (WBU) organise the National Welsh Championships and continued to work as an administrative officer with them after the 1998 Games.
