= Neil Cottrill =

English badminton player

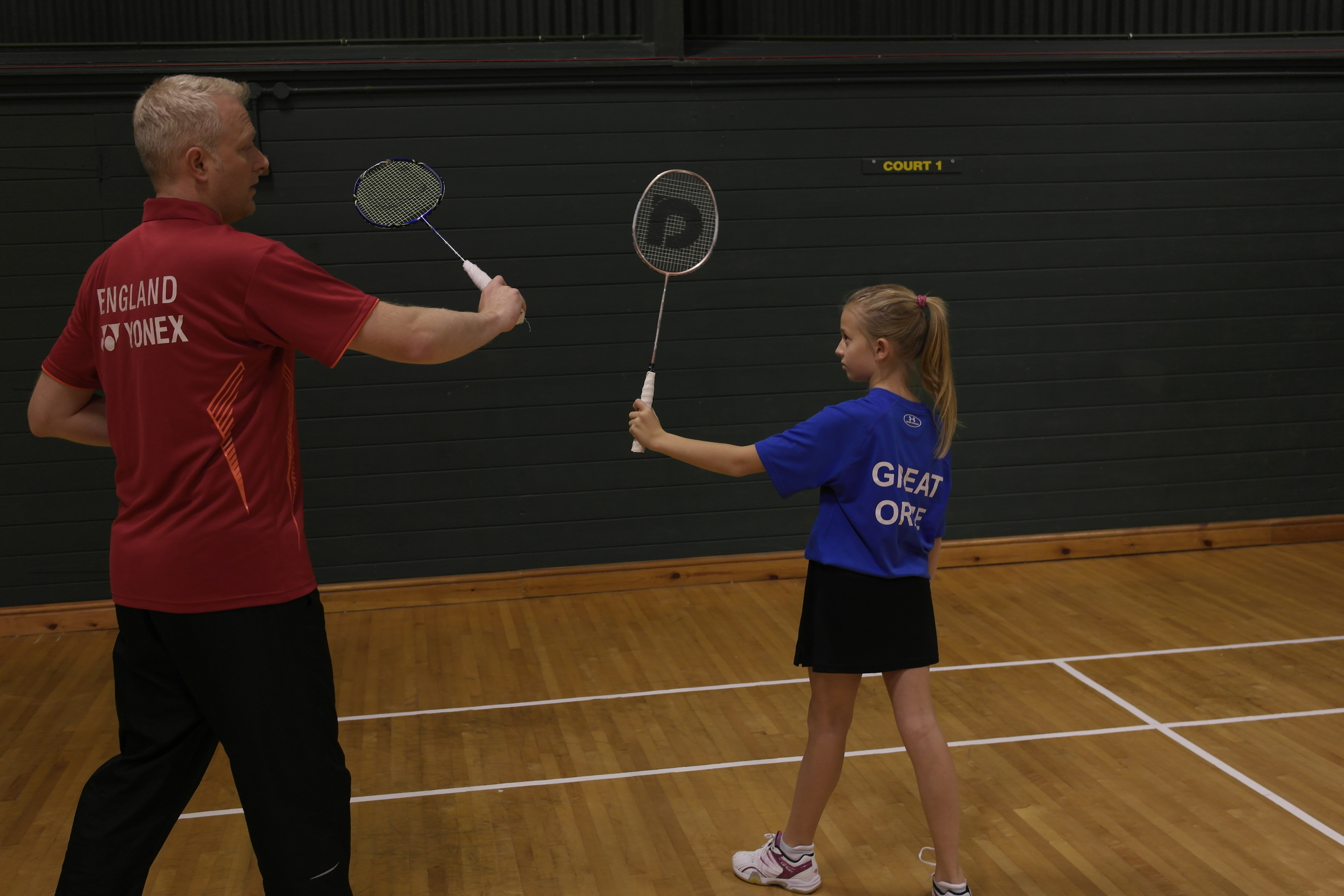
- Cottrill coaching

Personal information
- Nationality: British (English/Welsh)
- Born: 5 September 1971 (age 54) Stockport, England

Sport
- Sport: Badminton
Medal record
Representing Wales
Welsh Nationals
Gold medal – first place	1999–2002	men's doubles
Gold medal – first place	2001–2002	mixed doubles

Neil Cottrill (born 5 September 1971) is a former international badminton player from Great Britain who competed at the Commonwealth Games for Wales and is a six-times champion of Wales.

== Biography ==
Born in Stockport, Cottrill started playing badminton as a 10-year-old and subsequently won a string of English National junior titles, winning the boys doubles at U12, U14, U16 & U18 and the mixed doubles at U14 & U18. Neil represented England at all age groups in events around Europe as a junior, winning the boys doubles in the U16 6 nations, Dutch junior, Danish Junior and won a bronze medal in the U18 European Junior (as an U17).

Unfortunately his doubles partner, John Quinn suffered a long-term knee injury during the U18 season, leaving him without a regular partner for two years. Once John recovered, the pair quickly became one of the top pairs in the United Kingdom, winning numerous county events, Friends Provident Grand Slam Series events and reaching the 1995 National Championships men's doubles final, losing to Chris Hunt & Simon Archer.

He represented Cheshire and then Essex at county level and made a full senior debut for England in 1994.

Neil and John then went on the European Badminton Union circuit, where they were 1993 Czech Open champions. They soon progressed onto the World Grand Prix circuit, competing all round the world achieving a highest IBF men's doubles ranking of #12 in 1996. In 1995 they helped England inflict a rare defeat to China. The pair were in the GB Olympic squad and set for Olympic qualification for the Atlanta Games in 1996, but Neil was hit with a virus linked to over training which left him unable to train or compete for the six months prior to the games.

Neil retired from full-time badminton in August 1996 and became a lecturer in Sport and Exercise Science in North Wales. He also started a sports science support and coaching business in 1996 where he has worked with a number of athletes from different sports, improving their fitness and dietary practice. The Welsh Badminton Union secured Neil's services to head up their High Performance Centre in North Wales and after working for the WBU for a few years, Neil teamed up with then National coach Chris Rees in the men's doubles at the Welsh National Badminton Championships, where they won the event from 1999 to 2002. Neil also won the mixed doubles with Jo Muggeridge on two occasions.

Following this return to performance badminton, Neil represented Wales at World and European team competition with his last appearance being for the Welsh team at the 2002 Commonwealth Games in his home city of Manchester.

Following Neil's badminton career, he moved into education and has spent the majority of his career to date as a lecturer in Sport & Exercise Science. Neil led the development of the BSc(Hons) degree in Sports Coaching & Exercise Science initially for the University of Wales, then Bangor University, for which he was the Programme Leader. During this time he completed an MSc in Exercise & Nutrition Science and specialises in Dietary Analysis and Training and Recovery.

Over the last few years, Neil has taken up a role at Badminton England where he is the Head of Coaching, helping to provide coaches with the opportunity to develop their skills and experience at all levels. Neil works out of the National Badminton Centre in Milton Keynes and still works with performance badminton players in North Wales.

== Family ==
Joe Cottrill is the son of Neil Cottrill and also a semi professional in badminton.
