= David Tonks =

Welsh international badminton player

Personal information
- Nationality: British (Welsh)
- Born: circa 1972

Sport
- Sport: Badminton
Medal record
Representing Wales
Welsh Nationals
Gold medal – first place	1994	doubles

David Tonks (born circa 1972) is a former international badminton player from Wales who competed at the Commonwealth Games and is a former champion of Wales.

== Biography ==
In 1990 Tonks was playing for RFBPW (Rock Ferry and Bromborough Pool Woodlands) in Chester and later played out of Cheltenham.

He represented Cheshire at county level and Wales at international level. Tonks represented the Welsh team at the 1994 Commonwealth Games in Victoria, Canada, where he competed in the doubles, mixed doubles and mixed team events.

Tonks specialised in doubles and his partners in men's doubles included Richard Vaughan and Andrew Spencer and in mixed doubles included Sarah Williams.

He was the 1994 men's doubles champion of Wales at the Welsh National Badminton Championships.
