= Caroline Harvey (disambiguation) =

Caroline Harvey (born 2002) is an American ice hockey player.

Caroline Harvey may also refer to:

- Caroline Harvey (badminton) (born 1991), Welsh badminton player
- Joanna Trollope (1943–2025), English writer who used the pen name Caroline Harvey
