= Sue Alfieri =

Welsh international badminton player

Sue Alfieri née Earp
Personal information
- Nationality: British (Welsh)
- Born: Q3. 1949 Pembroke, Wales

Sport
- Sport: Badminton
Medal record
Representing Wales
Welsh Nationals
Gold medal – first place	1974–74, 1977	Mixed doubles
Welsh International
Gold medal – first place	1973	Women's doubles

Susan K. Alfieri née Earp (born 1949) is a former international badminton player from Wales who competed at the Commonwealth Games and is a three-times champion of Wales.

== Biography ==
Earp was born in Pembroke but represented Gloucestershire at county level and Wales at international level.

In 1969 Earp won the Gloucestershire tournament doubles with Rosemary Gerrish and the county women's doubles title. The following year in 1970 she won the 1970 county singles title and also married Severino Alfieri in Gloucester and would play under her married name thereafter.

Alfieri teamed up with Tony Finch to win the mixed doubles and Eleanor Collins to win the women's doubles at the 1973 Gloucestershire tournament. It was the third successive year in which Alfieri won the ladies doubles crown. Alfieri also won the women's doubles title with Ireland's Barbara Beckett at the 1973 Welsh International.

Alfieri represented the Welsh team at the 1974 British Commonwealth Games in Christchurch, New Zealand, playing in the singles and mixed doubles events. By 1978 she was playing primarily doubles and won the Gloucestershire Open mixed doubles title with Kim Stokes.

Alfieri was the three time women's doubles champion of Wales at the Welsh National Badminton Championships in 1974, 1975 and 1977, when partnering Brian Jones.
