= James Phillips (badminton) =

Welsh badminton player (born 1984)

Personal information
- Nationality: British (Welsh)
- Born: 13 May 1984 (age 42) Wales

Sport
- Sport: Badminton
- Event: men's doubles & mixed doubles
Medal record
Representing Wales
Welsh Nationals
Gold medal – first place	2010, 2012, 2020	men's doubles
Gold medal – first place	2008, 2012	mixed doubles

James Alexander Phillips (born 13 May 1984) is a former international badminton player from Wales who competed at two Commonwealth Games and is a five-times champion of Wales.

== Biography ==
Phillips attended Swansea University, graduating in 2006. He formed a successful men's doubles partnership with Joe Morgan and finished runner-up in the 2005 Latvia International and won the 2010 Croatian International.

Phillips represented the Welsh team at the 2006 Commonwealth Games in Melbourne, Australia, where he competed in the men's doubles event and reached the men's doubles quarter-final with Joe Morgan.

Four years later he represented the Welsh team again at the 2010 Commonwealth Games in Delhi, India, where he competed in the men's doubles event with Joe Morgan and the mixed doubles with Caroline Harvey.

Phillips was the five-times champion of Wales at the Welsh National Badminton Championships, winning the men's doubles title in 2010, 2012 and 2020 and the mixed doubles crown with Katy Howell in 2008 and Jordan Hart in 2012.

== Achievements ==
=== BWF International Challenge/Series ===
Men's doubles
Year	Tournament	Partner	Opponent	Score	Result
2010	Croatian International	(Wales) James Phillips	(Croatia) Zvonimir Hölbling (Croatia) Zvonimir Đurkinjak	21–14, 19–21, 22–20	(gold) Winner
2005	Latvia Riga International	(Wales) James Phillips	(Poland) Lukasz Moren (Poland) Wojciech Szkudlarczyk	11–15, 6–15	(silver) Runner-up
