= Matthew Hughes (badminton) =

Welsh badminton player

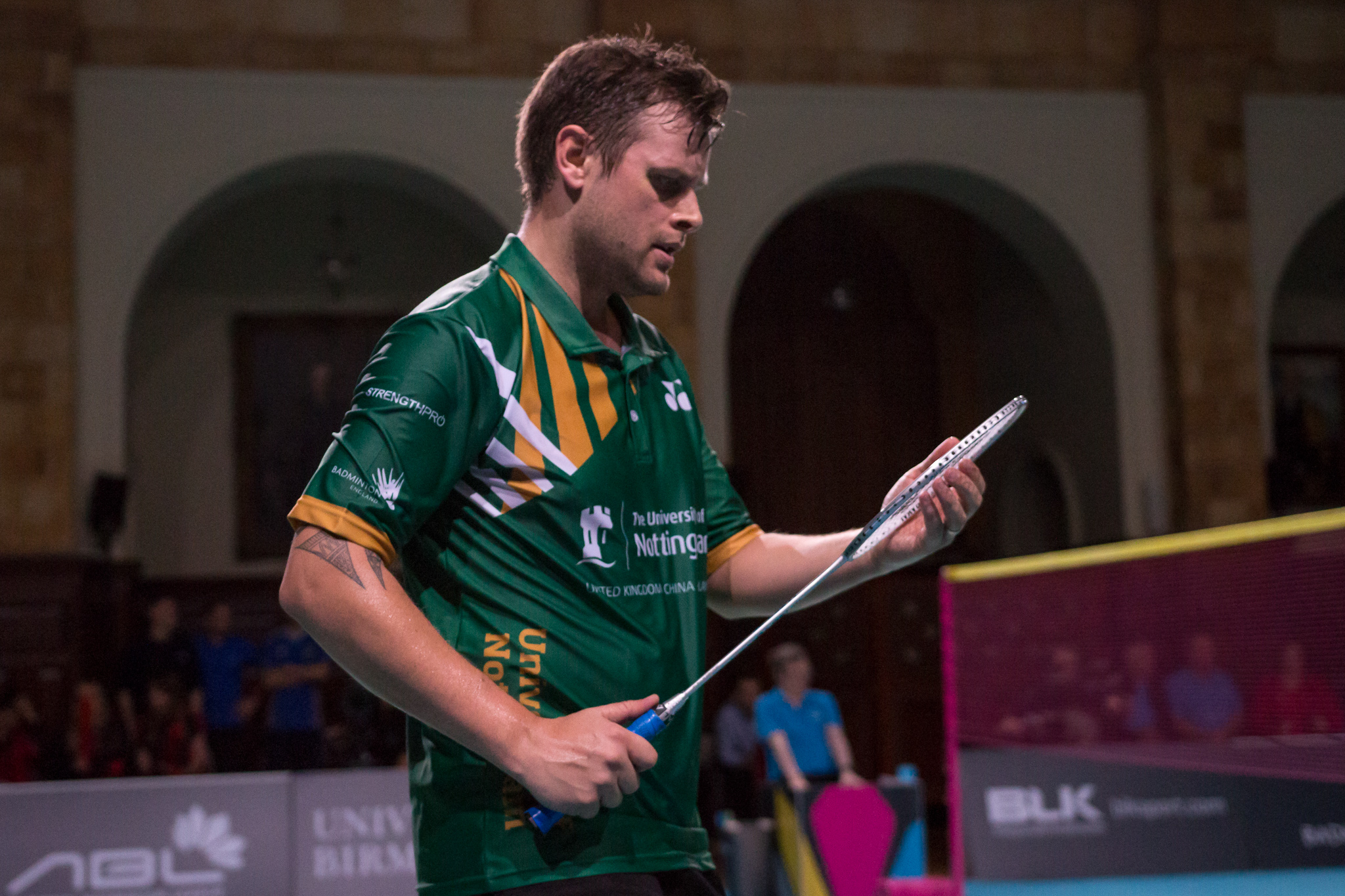

Personal information
- Nationality: British (Welsh)
- Born: 31 October 1978 (age 48) Penmaenmawr, Wales
- Height: 1.88 m (6 ft 2 in)

Sport
- Sport: Badminton
- Handedness: Right

doubles
- Highest ranking: 14 (XD), 18 (MD)
- BWF profile
Medal record
Representing Wales
Welsh Nationals
Gold medal – first place	2003, 2005–09, 2011	men's doubles
Gold medal – first place	2003–05	mixed doubles

Matthew Lee Hughes (born 31 October 1978) is a former international badminton player from Wales who competed at three Commonwealth Games and is a ten-times champion of Wales.

== Biography ==
Hughes had a career spanning 22 years, with 101 caps for Wales (becoming the fourth Welsh player to pass 100 caps), winning ten International tournaments alongside reaching highest rankings in both mixed and men's doubles disciplines.

Hughes represented the Welsh team at the 1998 Commonwealth Games in Kuala Lumpur, Malaysia, where he competed in the doubles and team events. He subsequently appeared at both the 2002 Commonwealth Games in Manchester and the 2006 Commonwealth Games in Melbourne.

Hughes was a ten-times champion of Wales at the Welsh National Badminton Championships winning the men's doubles seven times and mixed doubles three times.

Hughes is also a former Performance Manager and national coach of Badminton Wales. He has coached players at all the major team events World Championships, European Championships and Commonwealth Games.

== Achievements ==
=== IBF Grand Prix ===
Men's doubles
Year	Tournament	Partner	Opponent	Score	Result
2005	Polish Open	(Wales) Martyn Lewis	(Poland) Michał Łogosz (Poland) Robert Mateusiak	9–15, 7–15	(silver) Runner-up

=== IBF International ===
Men's doubles
Year	Tournament	Partner	Opponent	Score	Result
2006	Welsh International	(Wales) Martyn Lewis	(England) Andrew Ellis (England) Richard Eidestedt	21–9, 21–16	(gold) Winner
2006	Spanish International	(Wales) Martyn Lewis	(Denmark) Simon Mollyhus (Denmark) Anders Kristiansen	21–18, 22–20	(gold) Winner
2006	Polish International	(Wales) Martyn Lewis	(Poland) Michał Łogosz (Poland) Robert Mateusiak	18–21, 17–21	(silver) Runner-up
2006	Southern Pan Am International	(Wales) Martyn Lewis	(Canada) Mike Beres (Canada) William Milroy	21–13, 18–21, 15–21	(silver) Runner-up
2005	Brazil International	(Wales) Martyn Lewis	(Canada) Philippe Bourret (Denmark) Janek Roos	15–12, 15–10	(gold) Winner
2005	Spanish International	(Wales) Martyn Lewis	(Belgium) Wouter Claes (Belgium) Frédéric Mawet	15–11, 15–3	(gold) Winner
2004	Brazil International	(Wales) Martyn Lewis	(Brazil) Guilherme Kumasaka (Brazil) Guilherme Pardo	15–4, 15–5	(gold) Winner
2004	Spanish International	(Wales) Martyn Lewis	(Denmark) Joachim Fischer Nielsen (Denmark) Jesper Larsen	6–15, 5–15	(silver) Runner-up
2004	Hungarian International	(Wales) Martyn Lewis	(Russia) Nikolai Zuyev (Russia) Sergey Ivlev	3–15, 2–15	(silver) Runner-up
2003	Nigeria International	(Wales) Martyn Lewis	(Spain) Nicolás Escartín (Spain) Arturo Ruiz		(gold) Winner
2002	Mauritius International	(Wales) Martyn Lewis	(Mauritius) Stephan Beeharry (Mauritius) Yogeshsingh Mahadnac	15–10, 15–11	(gold) Winner
2002	Mexico International	(Wales) Martyn Lewis	(Brazil) Guilherme Kumasaka (Brazil) Guilherme Pardo	15–8, 15–6	(gold) Winner
1998	Slovenian International	(Wales) Chris Davies	(United States) Howard Bach (United States) Mark Manha	3–15, 5–15	(silver) Runner-up

Mixed doubles
Year	Tournament	Partner	Opponent	Score	Result
2004	Welsh International	(Wales) Kelly Morgan	(England) Chris Langridge (England) Caroline Westley	17–14, 8–15, 15–7	(gold) Winner
2003	Brazil International	(Wales) Joanne Muggeridge	(Spain) José Antonio Crespo (Spain) Dolores Marco	15–12, 13–15, 13–15	(silver) Runner-up
2003	Nigeria International	(Wales) Joanne Muggeridge	(Canada) Philippe Bourret (Canada) Denyse Julien	15–10, 15–11	(gold) Winner
2003	Peru International	(Wales) Joanne Muggeridge	(Spain) José Antonio Crespo (Spain) Dolores Marco	15–2, 15–13	(gold) Winner
2002	Welsh International	(Wales) Joanne Muggeridge	(Russia) Nikolai Zuyev (Russia) Marina Yakusheva	4–11, 6–11	(silver) Runner-up
2002	Mexico International	(Wales) Joanne Muggeridge	(Netherlands) Tjitte Weistra (Peru) Doriana Rivera	11–6, 11–13, 8–11	(silver) Runner-up
2002	Mauritius International	(Wales) Joanne Muggeridge	(Mauritius) Stephan Beeharry (Mauritius) Shama Aboobakar	11–5, 11–3	(gold) Winner
