= Dave Colmer =

Welsh international badminton player

Personal information
- Nationality: British (Welsh)
- Born: Q3. 1944 Cardiff, Wales

Sport
- Sport: Badminton
- Club: Steinberg BC
Medal record
Representing Wales
Welsh Nationals
Gold medal – first place	1967, 1975–1979	Men's doubles
Gold medal – first place	1971	Mixed doubles

William David Colmer (born 1944) is a former international badminton player from Wales who competed at the Commonwealth Games and is a seven-times champion of Wales.

== Biography ==
Colmer, from Whitchurch in Cardiff, was a member of the Steinberg Badminton Club and represented Glamorgan at county level and Wales at international level.

Colmer represented the Welsh team at the 1970 British Commonwealth Games in Edinburgh, Scotland, where he competed in the badminton events. He lost to Northern Ireland's Peter Moore in the singles and the English pair David Eddy and Derek Talbot in the men's doubles (with Howard Jennings).

Colmer was primarily a doubles player and partnered Howard Jennings and Brian Jones in competition during his career.

In December 1978 he earned his 50th cap for his country, becoming the first Welshman to do so.

Colmer was a seven-times champion of Wales in the men's doubles in 1967 and from 1975 to 1979 and in mixed doubles in 1971.
