= Julie Stockden =

Welsh international badminton player

Personal information
- Nationality: British (Welsh)
- Born: c. 1945 Wales

Sport
- Sport: Badminton
- Club: Swansea BC

Julie Stockden née Davies (born c. 1945) is a former international badminton player from Wales who competed at the Commonwealth Games.

== Biography ==
Stockden was a member of the Swansea Badminton Club and represented Glamorgan at county level.

In 1963 she married Geoffrey Stockden and played under her married name thereafter. She represented the Welsh team at the 1970 British Commonwealth Games in Edinburgh, Scotland, where she competed in the badminton events. Paired with Sue Hughes, they lost to the Scottish pair Joanna Flockhart and Helen Kelly in the women's doubles.

Sockden was a doubles specialist and also paired up with Angela Dickson in addition to Hughes during her career.

Stockden and was a team manager for West Glamorgan during the 1980s and was still playing at a regional county level in 1999.
