= Lyndon Williams =

Welsh badminton player and coach

Personal information
- Nationality: British (Welsh)
- Born: October 1964 (age 62) Cardiff, Wales

Sport
- Sport: Badminton
- Handedness: Right

Men's singles and doubles
- Highest ranking: 11 (MD)
- BWF profile
Medal record
Men's badminton
Representing Wales
European Championships
Bronze medal – third place	1988 Kristiansand	Men's doubles
European Junior Championships
Gold medal – first place	1983 Helsinki	Boys' doubles

Lyndon John Williams (born October 1964) is a former badminton player, coach, and para-coach, and is a 15-times champion of Wales.

== Biography ==
Williams won the boys' doubles title at the European Junior Champions in 1983

Williams represented the Welsh team at the 1986 Commonwealth Games in Edinburgh, Scotland, where he competed in the doubles, mixed doubles and mixed team events. He was also the men's doubles bronze medallist at the European Championships in 1988.

Williams collected fifteen Welsh National Badminton Championships titles, achieved 62 caps for Wales, and reached a career high as world number 11. He ended his career as badminton player due to back injury at the age of 24.

In 1989 he married fellow Welsh international and his mixed doubles partner Sarah Doody.

After retiring from playing, Williams worked for Badminton Wales for 18 years up until 2007 as national coach, performance manager and finally as executive director. He involvement in disability badminton started in the early 1990s, and became vice-president of International Badminton Association for the Disabled (IBAD), before the 2010 integration into the Badminton World Federation (BWF). He was involved with Para-Badminton as a member of the BWF Para-Badminton Commission and was chair of the four Nations Para-Badminton committee for a number of years.

He moved to Scotland in 2007 and co-founded the Lothian Disability Badminton Club in January 2008 and remained chair until 2016. He also returned to coaching, working with Edinburgh Councils Badminton Academy for six years and was awarded Sport Scotlands Disability Coach of the year in 2012 before retiring from coaching in 2019.

Williams has written several disability coaching modules and worked for Disability Sport Wales as a consultant. He was involved with researching the history of Badminton Wales as well as helping to establish the Welsh Ex-International players club in 2022. Williams is the Chair of Badminton Wales history working group, leading up to the organisation's 100th year celebrations in 2028.

== Achievement ==
=== European Championships ===
Men's doubles
Year	Venue	Partner	Opponent	Score	Result
1988	Badmintonsenteret; Kristiansand, Norway	(Wales) Chris Rees	(Denmark) Michael Kjeldsen (Denmark) Jens Peter Nierhoff	8–15, 7–15	Bronze

=== European Junior Championships ===
Men's doubles
Year	Venue	Partner	Opponent	Score	Result
1983	Helsinkian Sports Hall; Helsinki, Finland	(Wales) Chris Rees	(Denmark) Claus Thomsen (Denmark) Karsten Schultz	15–12, 18–16	Gold

=== IBF World Grand Prix ===
The World Badminton Grand Prix sanctioned by International Badminton Federation (IBF) since 1983.

Men's doubles
Year	Tournament	Partner	Opponent	Score	Result
1987	Scottish Open	(Wales) Chris Rees	(Denmark) Michael Kjeldsen (Denmark) Jens Peter Nierhoff	4–15, 4–15	(silver) Runner-up

=== IBF International ===
Men's doubles
Year	Tournament	Partner	Opponent	Score	Result
1986	Welsh Open	(Wales) Chris Rees	(England) Martin Dew (England) Darren Hall	7–15, 12–15	(silver) Runner-up
