= Sarah Thomas (badminton) =

Welsh badminton player (born 1992)

Personal information
- Nationality: British (Welsh)
- Born: 17 November 1992 (age 33) Cardiff, Wales
- Height: 1.57 m (5 ft 2 in)
- Weight: 52 kg (115 lb)

Sport
- Sport: Badminton

singles, doubles
- Highest ranking: 99 (WS) 22 Oct 2009; 52 (WD) 27 Mar 2014; 48 (XD) 12 Nov 2009
- BWF profile
Medal record
Representing Wales
Welsh Nationals
| Gold medal – first place | 2009–2012 | singles |
| Gold medal – first place | 2012–2017 | women's doubles |
| Gold medal – first place | 2010, 2013–14 | mixed doubles |

Sarah Thomas (born 17 November 1992) is a former international badminton player from Wales who competed at the Commonwealth Games and is a 13-times champion of Wales.

== Biography ==
Thomas represented the Welsh team at the 2010 Commonwealth Games in Delhi, India, where she competed in two events. She played in the singles and mixed doubles, the latter with Martyn Lewis

Thomas represented the Welsh team again at the 2014 Commonwealth Games in Glasgow, Scotland, where he competed in the women's and mixed doubles events.

Thomas is a 13-times champion of Wales at the Welsh National Badminton Championships, winning the singles from 2009 to 2012, the women's doubles six times with Carissa Turner from 2012 to 2017 and the mixed doubles in 2010, 2013 and 2014.

== Achievements ==
=== BWF International Challenge/Series ===
Women's doubles
| Year | Tournament | Partner | Opponent | Score | Result |
|---|---|---|---|---|---|
| 2014 | Portugal International | (Wales) Carissa Turner | (Scotland) Rebekka Findlay (Scotland) Caitlin Pringle | 21–17, 21–15 | (gold) Winner |
| 2014 | Iceland International | (Wales) Carissa Turner | (Iceland) Sara Hognadottir (Iceland) Margrét Johannsdottir | 21–11, 21–8 | (gold) Winner |
| 2013 | Cyprus International | (Wales) Carissa Turner | (Cyprus) Maria Avraamidou (Cyprus) Stella Knekna | 21–14, 21–13 | (gold) Winner |
| 2012 | Polish International | (Wales) Carissa Turner | (Poland) Kamila Augustyn (Poland) Agnieszka Wojtkowska | 15–21, 14–21 | (silver) Runner-up |
| 2012 | Slovenia International | (Wales) Carissa Turner | (Germany) Isabel Herttrich (Germany) Inken Wienefeld | 14–21, 21–13, 17–21 | (silver) Runner-up |

Mixed doubles
| Year | Tournament | Partner | Opponent | Score | Result |
|---|---|---|---|---|---|
| 2013 | Cyprus International | (Wales) Oliver Gwilt | (Belgium) Nathan Vervaeke (Belgium) Sabine Devooght | 21–10, 21–17 | (gold) Winner |
| 2009 | Cyprus International | (Wales) Richard Vaughan | (New Zealand) Henry Tam (New Zealand) Donna Haliday | 18–21, 14–21 | (silver) Runner-up |
| 2009 | Banuinvest International | (Wales) Richard Vaughan | (Ukraine) Valeriy Atrashchenkov (Ukraine) Elena Prus | 19–21, 12–21 | (silver) Runner-up |

BWF International Challenge tournament
BWF International Series tournament
BWF Future Series tournament
