= Wales at the 1994 Commonwealth Games =

- CGF code: WAL
- CGA: Wales at the Commonwealth Games
- Website: teamwales.cymru

in Victoria, Canada
- Medals Ranked 9th: Gold 5 Silver 8 Bronze 6 Total 19

Commonwealth Games appearances (overview)
- 1930; 1934; 1938; 1950; 1954; 1958; 1962; 1966; 1970; 1974; 1978; 1982; 1986; 1990; 1994; 1998; 2002; 2006; 2010; 2014; 2018; 2022; 2026; 2030

Wales competed at the 1994 Commonwealth Games in Victoria, Canada, from 18 to 28 August 1994.

Wales sent their largest team to date with 128 competititors and officials.

Wales came 9th overall with 5 gold, 8 silver and 6 bronze medals.

== Medallists ==
=== Gold ===
- Colin Jackson (athletics)
- Michael Jay (shooting)
- Dave Morgan (weightlifting - overall)
- Dave Morgan (weightlifting - snatch)
- Neil Winter (athletics)

=== Silver ===
- Jason Cook (boxing)
- Gloria Hopkins (lawn bowls)
- Rita Jones (lawn bowls)
- Sonia Lawrence (gymnastics)
- Bob Morgan (diving)
- Dave Morgan (weightlifting - c&j)
- Men's 25m rapid-fire pistol pairs (shooting)
- Men's pairs (lawn bowls)

=== Bronze ===
- Paul Gray (athletics)
- Gareth Hives (weightlifting - overall)
- Gareth Hives (weightlifting - snatch)
- Gareth Hives (weightlifting - c&j)
- Sally Hodge (cycling)
- Women's pairs (lawn bowls)

== Team ==
=== Athletics ===
Men

Athlete	Events	Club	Medals
Jamie Baulch	200, 400m, 4x400 relay		
Nigel Bevan	javelin throw		
Justin Chaston	steeplechase		
Paul Gray	110m hurdles, 4x400 relay		Bronze medal
Philip Harries	400m hurdles		
Justin Hobbs	5000, 10,000m		
Colin Jackson	110m hurdles		Gold medal
Peter Maitland	100, 200m, 4x400 relay		
Dale Rixon	marathon		
Iwan Thomas	200, 400m, 4x400 relay		
Lee Wiltshire	shot put		
Neil Winter	pole vault		Gold medal

Women

Athlete	Events	Club	Medals
Cathy Dawson	800m		
Lisa Gibbs	heptathlon		
Hayley L. Nash	marathon		

=== Badminton ===
Men

Athlete	Events	Club	Medals
Chris Rees	singles, doubles, mixed team	Penarth	
Geraint Lewis	singles, mixed, mixed team	Pontypridd	
David Tonks	doubles, mixed, mixed team	Cheshire	

Women

Athlete	Events	Club	Medals
Kelly Morgan	singles, doubles, mixed, mixed team	Tonteg	
Rachael Phipps	singles, doubles, mixed, mixed team	Tonteg	

=== Boxing ===
Athlete	Events	Club	Medals
Grant Briggs	75kg middleweight	Pontypridd ABC	
Jason Cook	57kg featherweight	Maesteg ABC	Silver medal
Gareth Lawrence	60kg lightweight	Highfields ABC, Cardiff	
Kevin McCormack	+91kg heavyweight	Coed Eva ABC, Cwmbran & Navy	
Andrew Robinson	63.5kg light-welterweight	Pembroke ABC, Cardiff	
Karl Thomas	67kg welterweight	Pentwyn ABC	
Richard Vowles	54kg bantamweight	Llanharan ABC	

=== Cycling ===
Men

Athlete	Events	Club	Medals
Stephen Colloby	scratch, pursuit, points, TTT		
Richard Hughes	road race, scratch, points		
Alun Owen	TTT		
Matt Postle	road race, TTT		
Daniel Wedley	road race		
Richard Wooles	road race, TTT		
William Wright	road race scratch, 1km time trial, points		

Women

Athlete	Events	Club	Medals
Clare Greenwood	road race, pursuit, points		
Sally Hodge	road race, points		Bronze medal

=== Diving ===
Athlete	Events	Club	Medals
Bob Morgan	springboard, platform		Silver medal

=== Gymnastics ===
Men

Athlete	Events	Club	Medals
Gareth Davies	all-around, team		
Gareth Irwin	all-around, horizontal, parallel, team		
Andrew Tombs	all-around, team		

Women

Athlete	Events	Club	Medals
Claire Hamer	all-around, floor, team		
Sonia Lawrence	all-around, floor, vault, team		Silver medal
Bethan Powell	all-around, uneven bars, team		

=== Lawn bowls ===
Men

Athlete	Events	Club	Medals
Jim Hoskins	fours	Bridgend BC	
Wyn Matthews	fours	Graig Merthyr BC	
John Price	pairs	Aberavon BC	Silver medal
Phil Rowlands	fours	Penhill BC	
Will Thomas	singles	Pontrhydyfen BC	
Robert Weale	pairs	Presteigne BC	Silver medal
Dai Wilkins	fours	Pontrhydyfen BC	

Women

Athlete	Events	Club	Medals
Janet Ackland	pairs	Penarth Belle Vue BC	Bronze medal
Ann Dainton	pairs	Barry Plastics BC	Bronze medal
Mary Davies	fours	Llandrindod Wells BC	
Linda Evans	fours	Port Talbot BC	
Val Howell	fours	Merthyr West End BC	
Rita Jones	singles	Gilfach Bargoed BC	Silver medal
Betty Morgan	fours	Llandrindod Wells BC	

=== Shooting ===
Men

Athlete	Events	Club	Medals
James Birkett-Evans	trap, pair		
Richard Craven	rapid fire, pair, centre fire pistol, pair		Silver medal
David Davies	fullbore rifle, pair		
Desmond Davies	skeet, pair		
Mark Evans	trap, pair		
Jonathan James	fullbore rifle, pair		
Michael Jay	rapid fire, pair, centre fire pistol, pair		,
Antony Lewis	skeet, pair		
Adrian Morris	air rifle		

Women

Athlete	Events	Club	Medals
Susan Hartop	air rifle, pair, rifle 3Pos, pair, prone, pair		
Julie Malcolm	air rifle, pair, rifle 3Pos, pair, prone, pair		

=== Swimming ===
Men

Athlete	Events	Club	Medals
Andrew Ayers	100, 200m breaststroke, medley relay		
Christopher Jones	100, 200m backstroke, 200 free, 200, 400 medley, 2xrelay		
Mark Jones	100m butterfly, 50, 100m free, 2xrelay		
Ian Lundie	200, 400m free, freestyle relay		
Phillip Melhuish	100, 200m breaststroke		
Michael Watkins	100, 200m butterfly, 2xrelay		

Women

Athlete	Events	Club	Medals
Victoria Hale	200, 400m freestyle, 400 medley, 4x100 free relay		
Sara Hopkins	50, 100m freestyle, 4x100 free relay		
Maxine Lock	100m butterfly, 50, 100m free, 4x100 free relay		
Charlotte Niblett	200, 400m medley, 4x100 free relay		

=== Weightlifting ===
Athlete	Events	Club	Medals
Andy Goswell	76kg		
Gareth Hives	108kg		,,
Dave Morgan	76kg		,,
Tony Morgan	70kg		
Terry Perdue	+108kg		
Paul Richard	64kg		
Mark Roach	70kg		
Neil Taylor	83kg		
Rhodri Thomas	83kg		
Gary Williams	99kg		
