= 1983 European Junior Badminton Championships =

Badminton championships

Tournament details
- Dates: 28 March – 2 April
- Edition: 8th
- Venue: Helsinkian Sports Hall
- Location: Helsinki, Finland

The 1983 European Junior Badminton Championships was the eighth edition of the European Junior Badminton Championships. It was held in Helsinki, Finland, in the month of March and April. Denmark won two disciplines, the boys' singles and mixed doubles, England won three titles in the girls' singles, girls' doubles and mixed team championships, while, Wales won the boys' doubles.

== Medalists ==
Discipline	Gold	Silver	Bronze
Boys' singles	(Denmark) Claus Thomsen	(Denmark) Karsten Schultz	(Netherlands) Pierre Pelupessy
Boys' singles	(Denmark) Claus Thomsen	(Denmark) Karsten Schultz	(Sweden) Stellan Österberg
Girls' singles	(England) Helen Troke	(Sweden) Christine Magnusson	(Denmark) Birgitte Hindse
Girls' singles	(England) Helen Troke	(Sweden) Christine Magnusson	(Denmark) Dorthe Lynge
Boys' doubles	(Wales) Chris Rees (Wales) Lyndon Williams	(Denmark) Claus Thomsen (Denmark) Karsten Schultz	(England) Darren Hall (England) Stuart Spurling
Boys' doubles	(Wales) Chris Rees (Wales) Lyndon Williams	(Denmark) Claus Thomsen (Denmark) Karsten Schultz	(England) Timothy Moseley (England) Peter Walden
Girls' doubles	(England) Lisa Chapman (England) Jane Shipman	(Sweden) Christine Magnusson (Sweden) Jeanette Kuhl	(Netherlands) Astrid van der Knaap (Netherlands) Nicole van Zijderveld
Girls' doubles	(England) Lisa Chapman (England) Jane Shipman	(Sweden) Christine Magnusson (Sweden) Jeanette Kuhl	(Scotland) Gillian Martin (Scotland) Jennifer Allen
Mixed doubles	(Denmark) Anders Nielsen (Denmark) Gitte Paulsen	(Sweden) Stellan Österberg (Sweden) Christine Magnusson	(Germany) Ralf Rausch (Germany) Susanne Altmann
Mixed doubles	(Denmark) Anders Nielsen (Denmark) Gitte Paulsen	(Sweden) Stellan Österberg (Sweden) Christine Magnusson	(England) Timothy Moseley (England) Lisa Chapman
Mixed team	England; Darren Hall; Miles Johnson; Timothy Moseley; Stuart Spurling; Peter Walden; Lisa Chapman; Alison Fisher; Jane Shipman; Helen Troke	Denmark; Henrik Lunde; Anders Nielsen; Jan Paulsen; Karsten Schultz; Claus Thomsen; Birgitte Hindse; Dorthe Lynge; Gitte Paulsen; Gitte Søgaard; Lene Sørensen	Sweden; Jens Bülow; Ronny Dahl; Mikael Erliksson; Jonas Hellmer; Jens Olsson; Stellan Österberg; Jeanette Kuhl; Catharina Andersson; Christine Magnusson; Charlotta Wihlborg

== Results ==
=== Semi-finals ===
Category	Winner	Runner-up	Score
Boys' singles	(Denmark) Claus Thomsen	(Netherlands) Pierre Pelupessy	15–11, 15–12
Boys' singles	(Denmark) Karsten Schultz	(Sweden) Stellan Österberg	15–18, 15–10, 15–11
Girls' singles	(Sweden) Christine Magnusson	(Denmark) Birgitte Hindse	11–7, 11–9
Girls' singles	(England) Helen Troke	(Denmark) Dorthe Lynge	11–2, 11–3
Boys' doubles	(Wales) Chris Rees (Wales) Lyndon Williams	(England) Peter Walden (England) Timothy Moseley	15–10, 18–15
Boys' doubles	(Denmark) Claus Thomsen (Denmark) Karsten Schultz	(England) Darren Hall (England) Stuart Spurlig	17–14, 15–8
Girls' doubles	(Sweden) Christine Magnusson (Sweden) Jeanette Kuhl	(Netherlands) Astrid van der Knaap (Netherlands) Nicole van Zijderveld	13–15, 15–6, 15–11
Girls' doubles	(England) Jane Shipman (England) Lisa Chapman	(Scotland) Gillian Martin (Scotland) Jennifer Allen	15–7, 15–2
Mixed doubles	(Denmark) Anders Nielsen (Denmark) Gitte Paulsen	(England) Timothy Moseley (England) Lisa Chapman	15–4, 7–15, 15–11
Mixed doubles	(Sweden) Stellan Österberg (Sweden) Christine Magnusson	(West Germany) Ralf Rausch (West Germany) Susanne Altmann	15–12, 15–12

=== Final ===
Category	Winner	Runners-up	Score
Boys' singles	(Denmark) Claus Thomsen	(Denmark) Karsten Schultz	15–11, 15–4
Girls' singles	(England) Helen Troke	(Sweden) Christine Magnusson	11–5, 12–10
Boys' doubles	(Wales) Chris Rees (Wales) Lyndon Williams	(Denmark) Claus Thomsen (Denmark) Karsten Schultz	15–12, 18–16
Girls' doubles	(England) Jane Shipman (England) Lisa Chapman	(Sweden) Christine Magnusson (Sweden) Jeanette Kuhl	15–6, 15–9
Mixed doubles	(Denmark) Anders Nielsen (Denmark) Gitte Paulsen	(Sweden) Stellan Österberg (Sweden) Christine Magnusson	15–7, 15–12

== Medal table ==
Rank	Nation	Gold	Silver	Bronze	Total
1	England (ENG)	3	0	3	6
2	Denmark (DEN)	2	3	2	7
3	Wales (WAL)	1	0	0	1
4	Sweden (SWE)	0	3	2	5
5	Netherlands (NED)	0	0	2	2
6	Scotland (SCO)	0	0	1	1
6	West Germany (FRG)	0	0	1	1
Totals (7 entries)		6	6	11	23
