= Katy Howell =

Welsh international badminton player

Personal information
- Nationality: British (Welsh)

Sport
- Sport: Badminton
Medal record
Representing Wales
Welsh Nationals
Gold medal – first place	1998	women's doubles
Gold medal – first place	1998, 2008	mixed doubles

Katy Howell is a former international badminton player from Wales who competed at the Commonwealth Games and is a three-times champion of Wales.

== Biography ==
Howell, from Swansea represented West Glamorgan at county level and Wales at international level.

She specialised in doubles play and her partners included Gail Osborne and Kelly Morgan in women's doubles and Andrew Groves-Burke, John Leung and James Phillips in mixed doubles. She won both the women's doubles title with Gail Osborne and the mixed doubles title with John Leung at the 1998 Welsh National Badminton Championships.

Howell subsequently represented the Welsh team at the 1998 Commonwealth Games in Kuala Lumpur, Malaysia, where she competed in the singles, doubles and team events. Shortly after the Games, Howell joined the sports department at the Graig campus of Carmarthenshire College as a lecturer.

Howell partnered Kelly Morgan when finishing runner-up in the 2001 women's doubles final at the nationals, and went on to secure a second national mixed doubles title in 2008.
