= Nic Strange =

Welsh badminton player

Personal information
- Nationality: British (Welsh)
- Born: 26 March 1987 (age 39) Bangor, Wales
- Height: 1.80 m (5 ft 11 in)
- Weight: 90 kg (198 lb)

Sport
- Sport: Badminton
- Handedness: Right

Men's & mixed doubles
- Highest ranking: 56 (MD 31 October 2013); 624 (XD 20 August 2015)
- BWF profile
Medal record
Representing Wales
Welsh Nationals
Gold medal – first place	2012–13, 2016–17; 2022	men's doubles

Nicolas Strange (born 26 March 1987) is an international badminton player from Wales who competed at the Commonwealth Games and is a five-times champion of Wales.

== Biography ==
Strange represented the Welsh team at the 2014 Commonwealth Games in Glasgow, Scotland, where he competed in one event. He partnered Joe Morgan in the men's doubles competition during the Games.

He has won three international titles in Slovakia, Iceland and Cyprus (with Joe Morgan) and is a five-times men's doubles champion of Wales at the Welsh National Badminton Championships, winning the title in 2012 with James Phillips, 2013 and 2016 with Joe Morgan, 2017 with Scott Oates and 2022 with Andrew Oates.

In 2018 he was the head coach at the University of Warwick.

== Achievements ==
=== BWF International Challenge/Series ===
Men's doubles
Year	Tournament	Partner	Opponent	Score	Result
2012	Slovak Open	(Wales) Joe Morgan	(Belarus) Aleksei Konakh (Belarus) Yauheni Yakauchuk	21–9 21–17	(gold) Winner
2012	Iceland International	(Wales) Joe Morgan	(Scotland) Martin Campbell (Scotland) Patrick MacHugh	21–17,21–16	(gold) Winner
2013	Cyprus International	(Wales) Joe Morgan	(England) Sam Parsons (England) Rhys Walker	24–22, 19–21, 21–14	(gold) Winner
2013	Bulgarian Eurasia Open	(Wales) Joe Morgan	(Scotland) Martin Campbell (Scotland) Patrick MacHugh	23–25, 10–21	(silver) Runner-up
2013	Hatzor International	(Wales) Joe Morgan	(Russia) Vladimir Malkov (Russia) Vadim Novoselov	18–21, 21–19, 25–27	(silver) Runner-up

BWF International Challenge tournament
BWF International Series tournament
BWF Future Series tournament
