= John Leung =

Welsh international badminton player

Personal information
- Nationality: British (Welsh)
- Born: c.1975 North Wales

Sport
- Sport: Badminton
- Club: Broadway & Aston Villa BC
Medal record
Representing Wales
Welsh Nationals
Gold medal – first place	1994, 1998	men's singles
Gold medal – first place	1998	mixed doubles

John Leung (born c.1975) is a former international badminton player from Wales who competed at the Commonwealth Games and is a three-times champion of Wales.

== Biography ==
Leung was born in North Wales and played out of Beddau. He moved to Birmingham in England and played for the Broadway and Aston Villa Badminton Club.

In 1994 he was ranked the number 1 singles player in Wales and the same year won the singles championship of Wales at the Welsh National Badminton Championships.

He subsequently represented Wales at international level and in addition to the singles, also played mixed doubles, where his partners included Kelly Morgan and Katy Howell.

He represented the Welsh team at the 1998 Commonwealth Games in Kuala Lumpur, Malaysia, where he competed in four events.

Leung went on to win a second singles title and a mixed doubles title at the 1998 Welsh National Championships.
