= Rachael Phipps =

Welsh international badminton player

Personal information
- Nationality: British (Welsh)
- Born: Q2. 1974 Pontypridd, Wales

Sport
- Sport: Badminton
Medal record
Representing Wales
Welsh Nationals
Gold medal – first place	1992, 1994–1997	doubles

Rachael Phipps (born 1974) is a former international badminton player from Wales who competed at the Commonwealth Games and is a five-times champion of Wales.

== Biography ==
Phipps, born in 1974, began playing badminton for the U12 Glamorgan team and then the British U16 teams. From Tonteg, she lived in the same street as fellow international Kelly Morgan

In 1990 she won the individual junior title at the U16 international series in Coventry and was based in and played county badminton for Warwickshire, making her debut in 1992.

Phipps represented Wales at international level and specialised in doubles, partnering Kelly Morgan for the majority of her women's doubles competitions.

Phipps represented the Welsh team at the 1994 Commonwealth Games in Victoria, Canada, where she competed in the four events.

She was a five-times champion of Wales at the Welsh National Badminton Championships, winning the women's doubles in with Kelly Morgan in 1992, 1994, 1995, 1996 and 1997.
