= Carissa Turner =

Welsh badminton and Australian rules football player

Personal information
- Nationality: British (Welsh)
- Born: 6 August 1989 (age 37) Cardiff, Wales
- Height: 1.79 m (5 ft 10 in)
- Weight: 64 kg (141 lb)

Sport
- Sport: Badminton

Women's singles and doubles
- Highest ranking: 86 (WS 11 July 2013); 52 (WD 27 March 2014; 171 (XD 18 August 2016)
- BWF profile
Medal record
Representing Wales
Welsh Nationals
Gold medal – first place	2013–2015	singles
Gold medal – first place	2010, 2012–2019	women's doubles
Gold medal – first place	2019	mixed doubles

Carissa Turner (born 6 August 1989) is a former international badminton player from Wales who competed at two Commonwealth Games and is a 13-times champion of Wales. Additionally, she was an Australian rules football player.

== Biography ==
=== Badminton ===
Turner represented the Welsh team at the 2010 Commonwealth Games in Delhi, India, where she competed in two events. She played in the singles and women's doubles, the latter with Caroline Harvey

Turner is a 13-times champion of Wales at the Welsh National Badminton Championships, winning the singles from 2013 to 2015, the women's doubles nine times from 2010 to 2019 (six with Sarah Thomas) and the mixed doubles in 2019.

In her badminton career she achieved 42 Welsh Caps, 3 international titles and represented represented the Welsh team again at the 2014 Commonwealth Games in Glasgow, where she competed in the singles and women's doubles events.

=== Australian rules ===
In Australian Football she has 9 Welsh Caps and 5 GB Caps, represents Cardiff Panthers in the Wales & England Women's 9s League while also representing West London Wildcats in the AFL London 18 a-side league. She was part of the South Wales Universities team that finished as minor premiers in the 2020 AFL England National University League.

== Badminton Achievements ==
=== BWF International Challenge/Series ===
Women's singles
Year	Tournament	Opponent	Score	Result
2013	Cyprus International	(Bulgaria) Linda Zetchiri	15–21, 19–21	(silver) Runner-up

Women's doubles
Year	Tournament	Partner	Opponent	Score	Result
2014	Portugal International	(Wales) Sarah Thomas	(Scotland) Rebekka Findlay (Scotland) Caitlin Pringle	21–17, 21–15	(gold) Winner
2014	Iceland International	(Wales) Sarah Thomas	(Iceland) Sara Hognadottir (Iceland) Margrét Johannsdottir	21–11, 21–8	(gold) Winner
2013	Cyprus International	(Wales) Sarah Thomas	(Cyprus) Maria Avraamidou (Cyprus) Stella Knekna	21–14, 21–13	(gold) Winner
2012	Polish International	(Wales) Sarah Thomas	(Poland) Kamila Augustyn (Poland) Agnieszka Wojtkowska	15–21, 14–21	(silver) Runner-up
2012	Slovenia International	(Wales) Sarah Thomas	(Germany) Isabel Herttrich (Germany) Inken Wienefeld	14–21, 21–13, 17–21	(silver) Runner-up

BWF International Challenge tournament
BWF International Series tournament
BWF Future Series tournament

== Australian Football Achievements ==
Wales

Gained 13 Caps for Wales at the Euro Cup 2018, 2019 and 2022.

Great Britain

5 Caps for the GB Swans at the European Championships 2019. Selected to represent Great Britain at the International Cup 2020 (cancelled due to Covid-19 Pandemic). 5 Caps for the GB Swans at the European Championships 2022. 4 Caps for the GB Swans at the Transatlantic Cup 2024.

Club

Cardiff Panthers awards; Most Improved 2019, Player's Player 2021, President's Choice 2023, Club Person of the Year 2024.

West London Wildcats award; Women's Premiership's Best International Player 2021.
