= Gail Osborne =

Welsh international badminton player

Personal information
- Nationality: British (Welsh)
- Born: c. 1971

Sport
- Sport: Badminton
Medal record
Representing Wales
Welsh Nationals
| Gold medal – first place | 1998 | women's doubles |

Gail Osborne (born c. 1971) is a former international badminton player from Wales who competed at the Commonwealth Games and is a doubles champion of Wales.

== Biography ==
Osborne played out of Beddau and later Church Village, when she won the 1998 doubles title with Katy Howell at the Welsh National Badminton Championships.

She represented Wales at international level and reached the number two singles ranking in Wales behind Kelly Morgan and was beaten by Morgan in the 1997 final of the Welsh National Championships. Osborne was also a doubles player and partners included Katy Howell in women's doubles.

Osborne represented the Welsh team at the 1998 Commonwealth Games in Kuala Lumpur, Malaysia, where she competed in the singles, doubles and team events. She was a special guest at the 1998 Rhondda Cynon Taff Sports Personality of the Year awards, won by fellow badminton star Kelly Morgan.
