= Daniel Font =

Welsh badminton player (born 1993)

Personal information
- Nationality: British (Welsh)
- Born: 22 February 1993 (age 33) Mold, Wales

Sport
- Sport: Badminton
- Handedness: Right

Men's
- Highest ranking: 137 (MS) 17 Apr 2014; 85 (MD) 18 Jul 2013; 171 (XD) 18 Aug 2016
- BWF profile
Medal record
Representing Wales
Welsh Nationals
Gold medal – first place	2011, 2014–2015; 2018–19, 2021–25	singles
Gold medal – first place	2014–2015, 2018–19; 2023-25	men's doubles
Gold medal – first place	2014	mixed doubles

Daniel Font (born 22 February 1993) is an international badminton player from Wales who competed at the Commonwealth Games and is a record ten-times men's singles champion of Wales.

== Biography ==
Font represented the Welsh team at the 2014 Commonwealth Games in Glasgow, Scotland, where he competed in the singles and men's doubles events.

In 2023 at the Welsh National Badminton Championships, Font broke the seven men's singles win record held by Howard Jennings and Richard Vaughan and extended it to ten after winning in 2025.

In addition to his ten singles titles, he has also won the men's doubles seven times and the mixed doubles once in 2014.

== Achievements ==
=== BWF International Challenge/Series ===
Men's doubles
Year	Tournament	Partner	Opponent	Score	Result
2012	Irish International	(Wales) Oliver Gwilt	(Scotland) Martin Campbell (Scotland) Angus Gilmour	12–21, 26–24, 21–16	(gold) Winner

BWF International Challenge tournament
BWF International Series tournament
BWF Future Series tournament
