= Wales at the 1978 Commonwealth Games =

- CG code: WAL
- CGA: Wales at the Commonwealth Games
- Website: teamwales.cymru

in Edmonton, Canada
- Flag bearers: Opening: Closing:
- Medals Ranked 9th: Gold 2 Silver 1 Bronze 5 Total 8

Commonwealth Games appearances (overview)
- 1930; 1934; 1938; 1950; 1954; 1958; 1962; 1966; 1970; 1974; 1978; 1982; 1986; 1990; 1994; 1998; 2002; 2006; 2010; 2014; 2018; 2022; 2026; 2030

Wales competed at the 1978 Commonwealth Games in Edmonton, Canada, from 3 to 12 August 1978.

Several events were organised in order to raise funds to send a Welsh team to the Games.

Wales came 9th overall with 2 golds, 1 silver and 5 bronze medals.

== Medallists ==
=== Gold ===
- John Burns (weightlifting)
- Berwyn Price (athletics)

=== Silver ===
- Bill Watkins (shooting)

=== Bronze ===
- Jeffrey Bryce (weightlifting)
- John Russell Evans (lawn bowls)
- Anthony Feal (boxing)
- Men's pairs (lawn bowls)
- Men's fours (lawn bowls)

== Team ==
=== Athletics ===
Men

Athlete	Events	Club	Medals
John Davies	1500, 5000m, steeplechase		
Michael J. Critchley	marathon		
Michael Delaney	400m		
Glen Arthur Barry Grant	800m, 1500m		
Jeffrey Stephen Griffiths	200, 400m		
Steve James	400m hurdles		
Steve Jones	1500m, 5000m		
John Evan David Phillips	triple jump		
Berwyn Price	110m hurdles		Gold medal
David Lloyd Roberts	100, 200m		
Michael J. Rowland	marathon		
Tony Simmons	5000m, 10000m		

Women

Athlete	Events	Club	Medals
Venissa Head	discus throw, shot put		
Hilary Jane Hollick	1500m		
Ruth Howell	long jump, pentathlon		
Jacqueline Zaslona	javelin throw		

=== Badminton ===
Men

Athlete	Events	Club	Medals
Brian Jones	singles, doubles, mixed	Upton Badminton Club	
Yim Chong Lim	singles, doubles, mixed	Penarth Badminton Club	

Women

Athlete	Events	Club	Medals
Linda Blake	singles, doubles, mixed	Penarth Badminton Club	
Sue Brimble	singles, doubles, mixed	Cwmbran Badminton Club	

=== Boxing ===
Athlete	Events	Club	Medals
Tony Feal	67kg welterweight	Prince of Wales BC, Cardiff	Bronze medal
David George	54kg bantamweight	Swansea Docks ABC	
Russell Jones	51kg flyweight	Rhondda ABC	

=== Cycling ===
Athlete	Events	Club	Medals
Peter Hamilton	road race, indiv & team pursuit		
Neil Hodge	road race		
David Patten	scratch, time trial, team pursuit		
John Pritchard	road race, indiv & team pursuit		
Phillip Taylor	scratch, time trial, team pursuit		
Colin Thornton	road race, pursuit		
John Tudor	scratch, sprint, time trial		

=== Gymnastics ===
Men

Athlete	Events	Club	Medals
Michael Joseph Higgins	all-around		
Robert Jones	all-around		
Paul Preedy	all-around		

Women

Athlete	Events	Club	Medals
Linda Bernard	all-around, team		
Christina Pocock	all-around, team		
Linda Surringer	all-around, team		
Jacqueline Vokes	all-around, team		

=== Lawn bowls ===
Athlete	Events	Club	Medals
Gwyn Evans	fours	Gelli Park BC	Bronze medal
John Russell Evans	singles	Barry Athletic BC	Bronze medal
Jim Morgan	pairs	Barry Athletic BC	Bronze medal
Ellis Stanbury	fours	Llanbradach BC	Bronze medal
Ian Sutherland	fours	Beaufort BC	Bronze medal
Jock Thompson	fours	Rhiwbina BC	Bronze medal
Ray Williams	pairs	Bedwas BC	Bronze medal

=== Shooting ===
Athlete	Events	Club	Medals
Tony Bowden	rapid fire pistol		
Emyr Breese	trap		
Denis Brown	trap		
Robert Griffiths	skeet		
Colin Thomas Harris	50m rifle prone		
Howell Morley	fullbore rifle pair		
Roger Rees	skeet		
John Vivian	fullbore rifle pair		
Bill Watkins	50m free pistol		Silver medal
Peter Williams	50m free pistol		

=== Swimming ===
Men

Athlete	Events	Club	Medals
Leigh Atkinson	100, 200m breaststroke, relay		
Peter Morris	100, 200m butterfly, 400 medley		
Michael Roberts	100m backstroke, relay		
Graham Sadler	100, 200, 400m free, relay		
Mark Taylor	100 butterfly, 100, 200 free, relay		
Martin Morgan Thomas	100, 200m Butterfly, 200 medley		

Women

Athlete	Events	Club	Medals
Anne Adams	100, 200m butterfly, 200 medley, 100m breaststroke, relayx2		
Vanessa Jane Bullock	100, 200m free, relayx2		
Lindsey Adriene Motley	100 free, 100m backstroke, relayx2		
Amanda James	100m free, 100, 200m backstroke, relayx2		
Keri Jones	100, 200m breaststroke		

=== Weightlifting ===
Athlete	Events	Club	Medals
Terry Bennett	82.5kg		
Jeffrey Bryce	56kg		Bronze medal
David Brown	90kg		
Michael James Brown	+110kg		
John Burns	100kg		Gold medal
Alan Wilson Locking	90kg		
John N. McCreadie	67.5kg		
Ieuan Owen	67.5kg		
Robert Michael Shepherd	60kg		
