= Joe Morgan (badminton) =

Welsh badminton player (born 1979)

Personal information
- Nationality: British (Welsh)
- Born: 20 May 1979 (age 47) Gorseinon, Wales
- Height: 1.83 m (6 ft 0 in)
- Weight: 84 kg (185 lb)

Sport
- Sport: Badminton

men's doubles & mixed doubles
- Highest ranking: 48 (MD) 13 May 2010; 63 (XD) 17 Dec 2009
- BWF profile
Medal record
Representing Wales
Welsh Nationals
Gold medal – first place	2010, 2013, 2015–16	men's doubles
Gold medal – first place	2011	mixed doubles

Jonathan Neil Morgan also known as Joe Morgan (born 20 May 1979) is a former international badminton player from Wales who competed at three Commonwealth Games and is a five-times champion of Wales.

== Biography ==
Morgan formed a successful men's doubles partnership with James Phillips and finished runner-up in the 2005 Latvia International and won the 2010 Croatian International.

Morgan represented the Welsh team at the 2006 Commonwealth Games in Melbourne, Australia, where he competed in the singles and men's doubles events and reached the men's doubles quarter-final with James Phillips.

Four years later he represented the Welsh team again at the 2010 Commonwealth Games in Delhi, India, where he competed in the badminton events .

A third Commonwealth Games appearance ensued at the 2014 Commonwealth Games but this time he partnered Nic Strange in the men's doubles.

Morgan was the five-times champion of Wales at the Welsh National Badminton Championships, winning the men's doubles title in 2010, 2013, 2015 and 2016 and the mixed doubles crown with Jo Sullivan in 2011.

== Achievements ==
=== BWF International Challenge/Series ===
Men's doubles
Year	Tournament	Partner	Opponent	Score	Result
2013	Hatzor International	(Wales) Nic Strange	(Russia) Vladimir Malkov (Russia) Vadim Novoselov	18–21, 21–19, 25–27	(silver) Runner-up
2013	Bulgarian Eurasia Open	(Wales) Nic Strange	(Scotland) Martin Campbell (Scotland) Patrick MacHugh	23–25, 10–21	(silver) Runner-up
2013	Cyprus International	(Wales) Nic Strange	(England) Sam Parsons (England) Rhys Walker	24–22, 19–21, 21–14	(gold) Winner
2012	Iceland International	(Wales) Nic Strange	(Scotland) Martin Campbell (Scotland) Patrick MacHugh	21–17,21–16	(gold) Winner
2012	Slovak Open	(Wales) Nic Strange	(Belarus) Aleksei Konakh (Belarus) Yauheni Yakauchuk	21–9, 21–17	(gold) Winner
2010	Croatian International	(Wales) James Phillips	(Croatia) Zvonimir Hölbling (Croatia) Zvonimir Đurkinjak	21–14, 19–21, 22–20	(gold) Winner
2005	Latvia Riga International	(Wales) James Phillips	(Poland) Lukasz Moren (Poland) Wojciech Szkudlarczyk	11–15, 6–15	(silver) Runner-up

BWF International Challenge tournament
BWF International Series tournament
BWF Future Series tournament
