= Yim Chong Lim =

Welsh international badminton player

Personal information
- Nationality: British Welsh/Malaysian
- Born: December 1959 Malaysia

Sport
- Sport: Badminton
- Club: Penarth Badminton Club
Medal record
Representing Wales
Welsh Nationals
Gold medal – first place	1978–1979	Men's singles
Gold medal – first place	1989	Men's doubles
Gold medal – first place	1981–1983	Mixed doubles

Yim Chong Lim (born December 1959) is a former international badminton player from Wales who competed at the Commonwealth Games and is a six-times champion of Wales.

== Biography ==
Yim Chong Lim was born in Malaysia in 1959 and came to Wales to study in Cardiff and joined the Penarth Badminton Club.

He represented the Welsh team at the 1978 Commonwealth Games in Edmonton, Canada, where he competed in the singles, doubles and mixed doubles events.

In 1981 he was the number one ranked doubles player in Wales. In December 1983 he announced his retirement from international badminton after making 37 appearances for Wales.

He was a six-times champion of Wales at the Welsh National Badminton Championships, including winning the 1978 and 1979 singles titles.
