= Martyn Lewis (badminton) =

Welsh badminton player (born 1982)

Personal information
- Nationality: British (Welsh)
- Born: 12 August 1982 (age 44) Wales
- Years active: 1999
- Height: 1.77 m (5 ft 10 in)

Sport
- Sport: Badminton
- Handedness: Right
- Coached by: Zhou Junling
- BWF profile
Medal record
Representing Wales
Welsh Nationals
Gold medal – first place	2006, 2008	men's singles
Gold medal – first place	2003, 2005–09, 2011, 2020–21	men's doubles
Gold medal – first place	2009, 2016	mixed doubles

Martyn James Lewis (born 12 August 1982) is a former international badminton player from Wales who competed at three Commonwealth Games and is a 13-times champion of Wales.

== Biography ==
Although proficient in singles play he was primarily a specialist in doubles.

He represented the Welsh team at the 2002 Commonwealth Games in Manchester, England, where he competed in the badminton tournament. He continued to represent Wales after the 2002 Commonwealth Games and later went on to represent Wales at two more Commonwealth Games in 2006 and 2010.

In the national event, he plays for the Caerphilly, and has won 13 Welsh National Badminton Championships from 2003 to 2021.

== Achievements ==
=== BWF International Challenge/Series ===
Men's singles
Year	Tournament	Opponent	Score	Result
2004	Brazil International	(Japan) Yuichi Ikeda	7–15, 9–15	(silver) Runner-up

Men's doubles
Year	Tournament	Partner	Opponent	Score	Result
2008	Welsh International	(Scotland) Andrew Bowman	(Austria) Jürgen Koch (Austria) Peter Zauner	14–21, 21–15, 21–13	(gold) Winner
2008	Belgian International	(Scotland) Andrew Bowman	(Germany) Peter Käsbauer (Germany) Roman Spitko	21–14, 21–15	(gold) Winner
2006	Welsh International	(Wales) Matthew Hughes	(England) Andrew Ellis (England) Richard Eidestedt	21–9, 21–16	(gold) Winner
2006	Spanish International	(Wales) Matthew Hughes	(Denmark) Simon Mollyhus (Denmark) Anders Kristiansen	21–18, 22–20	(gold) Winner
2006	Polish International	(Wales) Matthew Hughes	(Poland) Michał Łogosz (Poland) Robert Mateusiak	18–21, 17–21	(silver) Runner-up
2006	Southern Pan Am International	(Wales) Matthew Hughes	(Canada) Mike Beres (Canada) William Milroy	21–13, 18–21, 15–21	(silver) Runner-up
2005	Brazil International	(Wales) Matthew Hughes	(Canada) Philippe Bourret (Denmark) Janek Roos	15–12, 15–10	(gold) Winner
2005	Spanish International	(Wales) Matthew Hughes	(Belgium) Wouter Claes (Belgium) Frédéric Mawet	15–11, 15–3	(gold) Winner
2005	Polish International	(Wales) Matthew Hughes	(Poland) Michał Łogosz (Poland) Robert Mateusiak	9–15, 7–15	(silver) Runner-up
2004	Brazil International	(Wales) Matthew Hughes	(Brazil) Guilherme Kumasaka (Brazil) Guilherme Pardo	15–4, 15–5	(gold) Winner
2004	Spanish International	(Wales) Matthew Hughes	(Denmark) Joachim Fischer Nielsen (Denmark) Jesper Larsen	6–15, 5–15	(silver) Runner-up
2004	Hungarian International	(Wales) Matthew Hughes	(Russia) Nikolai Zuyev (Russia) Sergey Ivlev	3–15, 2–15	(silver) Runner-up
2003	Nigeria International	(Wales) Matthew Hughes	(Spain) Nicolás Escartín (Spain) Arturo Ruiz		(gold) Winner
2002	Mauritius International	(Wales) Matthew Hughes	(Mauritius) Stephan Beeharry (Mauritius) Yogeshsingh Mahadnac	15–10, 15–11	(gold) Winner
2002	Mexico International	(Wales) Matthew Hughes	(Brazil) Guilherme Kumasaka (Brazil) Guilherme Pardo	15–8, 15–6	(gold) Winner

BWF International Challenge tournament
BWF International Series tournament
