= Lesley Roberts =

Welsh international badminton player

Personal information
- Nationality: British (Welsh)
- Born: c. 1958 Essex, England

Sport
- Sport: Badminton
- Club: Penarth Badminton Club
Medal record
Representing Wales
Welsh Nationals
Gold medal – first place	1986	singles
Gold medal – first place	1985–1986	doubles
Gold medal – first place	1986-1987	mixed doubles

Lesley Roberts (born c. 1958) is a former international badminton player from Wales who competed at the Commonwealth Games and is a five-times champion of Wales.

== Biography ==
Roberts, born in Essex, moved to Wales in 1982, living in St Mellons and played for the Penarth Badminton Club in Penarth, near Cardiff. She represented Glamorgan at county level and Wales at international level.

Roberts participated in singles and doubles play and her main women's doubles partner was Sarah Doody during her career. She represented the Welsh team at the 1986 Commonwealth Games in Edinburgh, Scotland, where she competed in the singles, doubles and mixed team events.

A civil servant by profession she retired from international competition in 1987. Roberts was also a competent squash player and won the South Glamorgan Championships in October 1987.

Roberts was the a five-times champion of Wales at the Welsh National Badminton Championships, winning the singles in 1986, the doubles in 1985 and 1986 and the mixed doubles in 1986 and 1987.
