= Oliver Gwilt =

Welsh badminton player (born 1993)

Personal information
- Nickname: Ollie
- Nationality: British (Welsh)
- Born: 28 June 1993 (age 33) Shrewsbury, England
- Height: 1.78 m (5 ft 10 in)
- Weight: 76 kg (168 lb)

Sport
- Sport: Badminton
- Handedness: Right

Men's
- Highest ranking: 612 (MS) 17 May 2012; 85 (MD) 18 Jul 2013; 161 (XD) 18 Jul 2013
- BWF profile
Medal record
Representing Wales
Welsh Nationals
Gold medal – first place	2014, 2018–2019	men's doubles
Gold medal – first place	2013, 2015	mixed doubles

Oliver Gwilt (born 28 June 1993) is an English-born international badminton player from Wales, who competed at the Commonwealth Games and is a five-times champion of Wales.

== Biography ==
Gwilt represented the Welsh team at the 2014 Commonwealth Games in Glasgow, Scotland, where he competed in two events. He partnerd Daniel Font in the men's doubles and Sarah Thomas in the mixed doubles.

Gwilt won a U17 European Junior mixed doubles bronze medal in Slovenia. and ia a five-times champion of Wales at the Welsh National Badminton Championships, winning the men's doubles in 2014, 2018 and 2019 (all with Daniel Font) and the mixed doubles in 2013 with Sarah Thomas and in 2015 with his sister Emilie Gwilt.

== Achievements ==
=== BWF International Challenge/Series ===
Men's doubles
Year	Tournament	Partner	Opponent	Score	Result
2012	Irish International	(Wales) Daniel Font	(Scotland) Martin Campbell (Scotland) Angus Gilmour	12–21, 26–24, 21–16	(gold) Winner

Mixed doubles
Year	Tournament	Partner	Opponent	Score	Result
2013	Cyprus International	(Wales) Sarah Thomas	(Belgium) Nathan Vervaeke (Belgium) Sabine Devooght	21–10, 21–17	(gold) Winner

BWF International Challenge tournament
BWF International Series tournament
BWF Future Series tournament
