= Geraint Lewis (badminton) =

Welsh international badminton player

Personal information
- Nationality: British (Welsh)
- Born: 27 August 1973 Pontypridd, Wales

Sport
- Sport: Badminton
Medal record
Representing Wales
Welsh Nationals
Gold medal – first place	1993	singles
Gold medal – first place	1996–1998	doubles

Geraint Lewis (born 27 August 1973) is a former international badminton player from Wales who competed at two Commonwealth Games and is a four-times champion of Wales.

== Biography ==
Lewis born in 1973, started playing at the age of 9. He was from Beddau but trained in Wiltshire, England and represented Wales at international level.

Lewis represented the Welsh team at the 1994 Commonwealth Games in Victoria, Canada, where he competed in the singles and mixed doubles events.

In 1996 he won the Leicestershire Open and two years later represented the Welsh team again at the 1998 Commonwealth Games in Kuala Lumpur, Malaysia, where he competed in the singles and doubles events.

He was the four-times champion of Wales at the Welsh National Badminton Championships, including winning the singles in 1993.
