= Patrick MacHugh =

Scottish badminton player (born 1992)

Personal information
- Born: Patrick Robin Douglas MacHugh; 29 March 1992 (age 34) Kirkcaldy, Scotland
- Years active: 2009
- Height: 1.82 m (6 ft 0 in)
- Weight: 76 kg (168 lb)

Sport
- Country: Scotland
- Sport: Badminton
- Handedness: Right
- Coached by: Wong Tat Meng; Andrew Bowman

Men's & mixed doubles
- Highest ranking: 52 (MD 26 October 2017); 176 (XD 26 September 2013)
- BWF profile

Patrick Robin Douglas MacHugh (born 29 March 1992) is a Scottish badminton player who played for the BC Tafers in Fribourg, Switzerland. He began playing badminton at aged ten, and selected to join national team in 2011. He competed at the 2014 and 2018 Commonwealth Games.

MacHugh educated marketing at the University of Strathclyde, in Glasgow, and also psychology at the Open University. He was awarded Sportsperson of the Year from the University of Strathclyde.

MacHugh has collected 4 international titles and winning 18 Scotland caps. He announced his retirement from full-time badminton in July 2018.

== Achievements ==
=== BWF International Challenge/Series ===
Men's doubles
Year	Tournament	Partner	Opponent	Score	Result
2018	Swedish Open	(Scotland) Martin Campbell	(New Zealand) Oliver Leydon-Davis (Denmark) Lasse Mølhede	17–21, 12–21	(silver) Runner-up
2016	Estonian International	(Scotland) Martin Campbell	(Germany) Jones Ralfy Jansen (Germany) Josche Zurwonne	15–21, 18–21	(silver) Runner-up
2015	Hungarian International	(Scotland) Martin Campbell	(Denmark) Soren Gravholt (Denmark) Nikolaj Overgaard	21–13, 18–21, 21–16	(gold) Winner
2015	Portugal International	(Scotland) Martin Campbell	(England) Peter Briggs (England) Tom Wolfenden	17–21, 20–22	(silver) Runner-up
2015	Iceland International	(Scotland) Martin Campbell	(Denmark) Frederik Aalestrup (Denmark) Kasper Dinesen	21–16, 21–17	(gold) Winner
2014	Portugal International	(Scotland) Martin Campbell	(Japan) Kazuki Matsumaru (Japan) Izumi Okoshi	21–18, 13–21, 17–21	(silver) Runner-up
2014	Iceland International	(Scotland) Martin Campbell	(Belgium) Mattijs Dierickx (Belgium) Freek Golinski	21–15, 12–21, 21–14	(gold) Winner
2013	Bulgaria Eurasia Open	(Scotland) Martin Campbell	(Wales) Joe Morgan (Wales) Nic Strange	25–23, 21–10	(gold) Winner
2012	Iceland International	(Scotland) Martin Campbell	(Wales) Joe Morgan (Wales) Nic Strange	17–21, 16–21	(silver) Runner-up

BWF International Challenge tournament
BWF International Series tournament
BWF Future Series tournament
