= Philip Sutton (badminton) =

Welsh badminton player

Phil Sutton
Personal information
- Nationality: British (Welsh)
- Born: 4 May 1960 (age 66) Ebbw Vale, Wales
- Height: 1.80 m (5 ft 11 in)

Sport
- Sport: Badminton
- Handedness: Right

Men's singles
- Highest ranking: 11
Medal record
Men's badminton
Representing Wales
Helvetia Cup
| Bronze medal – third place | 1981 Sandefjord | Team |
| Silver medal – second place | 1983 Basel | Team |
| Silver medal – second place | 1985 Warsaw | Team |
| Silver medal – second place | 1987 Belfast | Team |
Welsh Nationals
| Gold medal – first place | 1980–1985 | men's singles |
| Gold medal – first place | 1988, 1990 | mixed doubles |

Philip Colin Sutton (born 4 May 1960) is a former international badminton player from Wales who competed at two Commonwealth Games and is a nine-time champion of Wales.

== Biography ==
Sutton won the singles title at the Welsh National Badminton Championships, six times in row between 1979 and 1985.

In 1979 he won the Welsh Union Invitation singles, defeating Steve Gully in the final and becoming the Surrey and Welsh number one ranked player at the age of 19. and in 1980 he had been living in Guildford for two years. In 1981 he won three titles at the Gwent Championships. The singles, men's doubles with Gareth Prosser and mixed doubles with Sue Brimble.

Sutton represented the Welsh team at the 1982 Commonwealth Games in Brisbane, Australia, where he competed in the badminton events.

In 1983 he was playing badminton in Varteg and Enfield and won the 1983 Peruvian Open men's singles and doubles titles in Lima. Sutton also reached the quarter-finals of the men's singles 1983 All England Championships at Wembley and the last 16 of the 1983 World Championships in Denmark losing to Morten Frost in both events.

In 1984 Phil Sutton partnered with Jane Webster of England (she is now his wife) and reached the semifinals of the Indonesian Open mixed doubles. Sutton represented the Welsh team again at the 1986 Commonwealth Games in Edinburgh, Scotland, where he competed in the singles and mixed team events.

In 1987 Phil won the Swiss Open men's singles title. Sutton represented Wales 87 times in international matches

=== All-England ===
Men's Singles

- Quarter-finals 1983, lost to Morten Frost
- Last 16, 1979, lost to Fleming Delfs

Mixed doubles

- Quarter-finals with Jane Webster 1981, lost to Thomas Kilstrom and Gillian Gilks

=== IBF International ===
Men's singles

| Year | Tournament | Opponent | Score | Result |
|---|---|---|---|---|
| 1987 | Swiss International | (Netherlands) Pierre Pelupessy | 15-10, 15-3 | (gold) Winner |
| 1983 | Peru International | (Peru) Federico Valdez | 15–4, 15–9 | (gold) Winner |
| 1981 | Welsh International | (England) Stephen Baddeley | 15-3, 15-9 | (silver) Runner-up |

Men's Doubles

| Year | Venue | Partner | Opponent | Score | Result |
|---|---|---|---|---|---|
| 1983 | Peru International | (England) Gary Scott | (Peru) F Valdez (Peru) G Valdez | 15–7, 15-7 | (gold) Winner |
