= Peter Seaman (badminton) =

Welsh badminton player

Personal information
- Nationality: British (Welsh)
- Born: c.1944 Wales

Sport
- Sport: Badminton
- Event(s): singles, doubles
- Club: Steinberg BC, Hawthorn

Peter A. Seaman (born c.1944) is a former badminton player from Wales, who competed at the 1966 British Empire and Commonwealth Games (now Commonwealth Games).

== Biography ==
Seaman started playing badminton at the age of 8 and was a member of the Steinberg Badminton Club in Hawthorn. He attended the Pontypridd Boys' Grammar School and won the 1962 English Junior Singles Championship. His doubles partner was Howard Jennings, also from the Steinberg club and who he started playing with in 1960.

He represented the 1966 Welsh team at the 1966 British Empire and Commonwealth Games in Kingston, Jamaica, participating in the singles and doubles events. At the time of the Games he was living at Tonteg Close in Tonteg and worked for the Glamorgan County Council.

He continued to represent Wales after the Games, including appearing at the inaugural 1968 European Badminton Championships.
