= Caroline Harvey (badminton) =

Welsh international badminton player

Personal information
- Nationality: British (Welsh)
- Born: 9 September 1991

Sport
- Sport: Badminton
Medal record
Representing Wales
Welsh Nationals
Gold medal – first place	2008	singles
Gold medal – first place	2009–2010	women's doubles

Caroline Harvey (born 9 September 1991) is a former international badminton player from Wales who competed at the Commonwealth Games and is a three-times champion of Wales.

== Biography ==
Harvey, from Gorsedd near Holywell studied at the University of Wales Institute in Cardiff. In 2008, she was based in Cardiff when she won her first national singles championship.

Harvey represented the Welsh team at the 2010 Commonwealth Games in Delhi, India, where she competed in the women's doubles and mixed doubles events.

Harvey was the three-times champion of Wales at the Welsh National Badminton Championships, winning the singles in 2008 and the Women's doubles in 2009 and 2010 with Kerry Ann Sheppard and Carissa Turner respectively.

In 2017 she was involved in the Commonwealth Games Queen's Baton Relay as the 2018 Commonwealth Games approached but did not participate in the Games.
