= Sue Brimble =

Welsh international badminton player

Sue Brimble née Hughes
Personal information
- Nationality: British (Welsh)
- Born: c. 1950 Cwmbran, Wales

Sport
- Sport: Badminton
- Club: Cwmbran BC
Medal record
Representing Wales
Welsh Nationals
Gold medal – first place	1974, 1976–1980	Women's doubles
Gold medal – first place	1977	singles
Welsh International
Gold medal – first place	1975	Women's doubles

Susan Brimble née Hughes (born c. 1950) is a former international badminton player from Wales who competed at two Commonwealth Games and is a seven-times champion of Wales.

== Biography ==
Hughes was from Cwmbran and represented Wales at international level.

She represented the Welsh team at the 1970 British Commonwealth Games in Edinburgh, Scotland, where she competed in the badminton events. In December 1970 she married John Brimble and competed under married name thereafter.

She was a doubles specialist and paired up with Julie Stockden and Linda Blake in the women's doubles and in mixed doubles, her partners included Brian Jones and Phil Sutton during her career. In 1975 she won the Welsh International with another partner Angela Dickson.

Brimble went to a second Commonwealth Games when selected as part of the Welsh team for the 1978 Commonwealth Games in Canada. In 1981 she won the Gwent Championships mixed doubles with Phil Sutton.

She earned 63 caps for her country, being the first Welsh woman to earn 50 caps and was a seven-times champion of Wales at the Welsh National Badminton Championships.
