= Angela Dickson =

Welsh international badminton player

Angela Dickson née Davies
Personal information
- Nationality: British (Welsh)
- Born: 1944 Wales

Sport
- Sport: Badminton
Medal record
Representing Wales
Welsh Nationals
Gold medal – first place	1962–1976, 1978–1979	singles
Gold medal – first place	1962–1963, 1965; 1971–76	women's doubles
Gold medal – first place	1962, 1966–67, 1969–70; 1976, 1978–1980	mixed doubles
Welsh International
Gold medal – first place	1968–1969	singles
Gold medal – first place	1967, 1969, 1971, 1975	women's doubles
Gold medal – first place	1968–69, 1975	mixed doubles

Angelina R. Dickson née Davies (born 1944) is a former international badminton player from Wales who holds the women's all-time record for Welsh singles championships (16) and the all-time record for the total number of Welsh titles (33).

== Biography ==
Davies was born in 1944 and was in the Welsh team that toured Europe in 1964, the first time that the Welsh Badminton Union had taken part in an international match for five years.

Davies met Gordon 'Stuart' Dickson while working in the accounts department of the Western Welsh Bus Company and they started playing badminton together, winning the 1962 mixed doubles title at the Welsh National Badminton Championships. At the same event Davies also won the first of her 16 singles titles and the women's doubles title to claim the first three of what would become 33 Welsh titles for Davies.

On 17 November 1965 she married Stuart Dickson in Cardiff and competed under her married name thereafter.

Dickson was recognised as the leading female player in Wales for nearly two decades, winning 14 consecutive national singles titles from 1962 to 1976. It was not until 1976 during the 26th edition of the Welsh Nationals that Dickson's winning streak was ended when Sue Brimble won the title. She represented Wales at the inaugural European Badminton Championships in 1968.

In 1998 it was reported that Kelly Morgan was approaching Dickson's singles record but the report had failed to take into account that Dickson had also won four titles under her maiden name of Davies. By 2002, the singles record had correctly been listed as 16.

Her husband Stuart died on 7 November 2012.
