= Brian Jones (badminton) =

Welsh international badminton player

Personal information
- Nationality: British (Welsh)
- Born: c.1947 Lancashire, England

Sport
- Sport: Badminton
Medal record
Representing Wales
Welsh Nationals
Gold medal – first place	1975–1979	Men's doubles
Gold medal – first place	1974–1975, 1977–1980	Mixed doubles

Brian E. Jones (born c.1947) is a former international badminton player who competed at the Commonwealth Games and is an eleven-times champion of Wales.

== Biography ==
Jones, was born in Lancashire but lived in Rossett, Wales and played in the Chester leagues for the Upton club. He was a very successful junior, winning the All England Open Badminton Championships junior boys doubles in 1964 and 1965.

He soon represented Wales at international level and specialised in doubles, with partners including Dave Colmer Scott Werner and Phil Sutton in men's doubles and Sue Brimble and Linda Blake in mixed doubles competition during his career.

Jones represented the Welsh team at the 1978 Commonwealth Games in Edmonton, Canada, where he competed in the badminton events.

He earned 40 caps for his country and was an eleven times champion of Wales at the Welsh National Badminton Championships.
