= Sarah Williams (badminton) =

Welsh international badminton player

Sarah Williams née Doody
Personal information
- Nationality: British (Welsh)
- Born: Q3. 1961 Cardiff, Wales

Sport
- Sport: Badminton
- Club: Penarth Badminton Club
Medal record
Representing Wales
Welsh Nationals
Gold medal – first place	1986–1989	doubles
Gold medal – first place	1984–85, 1988–89, 1994–95	mixed doubles

Sarah Williams née Doody (born 1961) is a former international badminton player from Wales who competed at two Commonwealth Games and is a ten-times champion of Wales.

== Biography ==
Doody, was born in Cardiff and played for Penarth Badminton Club near Cardiff. She represented Glamorgan at county level and Wales at international level.

Doody specialised in doubles and her women's doubles partners included Lesley Roberts and Sian Williams and her mixed doubles partners included Chris Rees and Lyndon Williams during her career.

Doody represented the Welsh team at the 1986 Commonwealth Games in Edinburgh, Scotland, where she competed in the doubles and mixed team events.

In 1989 she married fellow Welsh international and her doubles partner Lyndon Williams and played under her married name of Sarah Williams thereafter. Williams represented Welsh team again at the 1990 Commonwealth Games in Auckland, New Zealand.

She earned a record 112 caps for her country and was ten-times champion of Wales at the Welsh National Badminton Championships.
