= Steve Gully =

Welsh international badminton player

Personal information
- Nationality: British (Welsh)
- Born: Q2. 1949 Swansea, Wales

Sport
- Sport: Badminton
- Club: Swansea BC
Medal record
Representing Wales
Welsh Nationals
Gold medal – first place	1976	singles

Stephen J. Gully (born 1949) is a former international badminton player from Wales who competed at the Commonwealth Games and is a singles champion of Wales.

== Biography ==
Gully was a member of the Swansea Badminton Club and represented Wales at international level. He represented the Welsh team at the 1970 British Commonwealth Games in Edinburgh, Scotland, where he competed in the badminton events.

At the end of 1976 he was the Welsh number one ranked player. and in 1979 he lost the final of the Welsh Union Invitation singles to Phil Sutton.

He earned 21 caps for his country and was the 1976 singles champion of Wales at the Welsh National Badminton Championships.
