= Howard Jennings =

Welsh badminton player

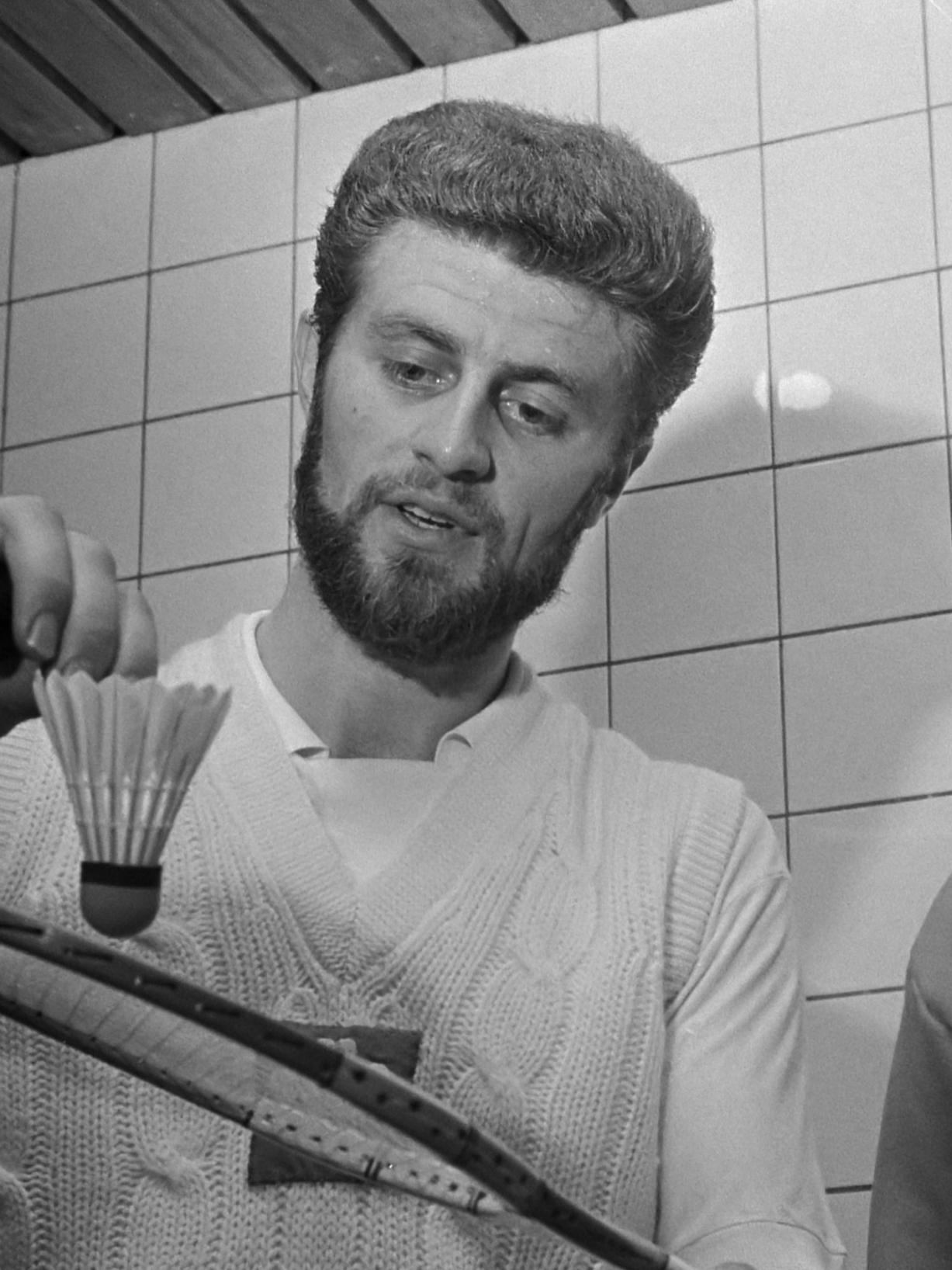

Personal information
- Nationality: British (Welsh)
- Born: c. 1943 Wales

Sport
- Sport: Badminton
- Event(s): singles, doubles
- Club: Steinberg BC, Hawthorn

Howard R. Jennings (born c. 1943) is a Welsh former badminton player, who competed at the 1966 British Empire and Commonwealth Games and the 1974 British Commonwealth Games (now Commonwealth Games).

== Biography ==
Jennings started playing badminton aged 13 at the Trehopcyn Youth Club and later joined the Steinberg Badminton Club in Hawthorn. His doubles partner was Peter Seaman, also from the Steinberg club and who he started playing with in 1960.

He represented the 1966 Welsh team at the 1966 British Empire and Commonwealth Games in Kingston, Jamaica, participating in the singles and doubles events. At the time of the Games he was living at Telelkebir Road in Hopkinstown and was working for building company.

He continued to represent Wales after the Games and was a six-times Welsh International champion: singles 1968 and 1969, doubles 1969 and mixed doubles in 1968, 1969 and 1975.

He was the Welsh number one and competed at the 1974 Commonwealth Games.

He was a seven-times singles champion of Wales and was capped 34 times.
