= Chris Rees (badminton) =

Welsh badminton player, coach, and manager

Personal information
- Nationality: British (Welsh)
- Born: 30 June 1965 (age 61)
- Height: 1.77 m (5 ft 10 in)

Sport
- Sport: Badminton
- Handedness: Right
- Event: Men's singles and doubles

Men's singles and doubles
- BWF profile
Medal record
Men's badminton
Representing Wales
European Championships
Bronze medal – third place	1988 Kristiansand	Men's doubles
European Junior Championships
Gold medal – first place	1983 Helsinki	Boys' doubles

Christopher Rees (born 30 June 1965) is a former Welsh badminton player, who later works as national team coach and manager. He attended four Commonwealth Games (one as team manager) and is a 24-times champion of Wales.

== Biography ==
Rees won the boys' doubles title at the European Junior Champions in 1983 and the men's doubles bronze medalist at the European Championships in 1988.

A shopkeeper by profession, he competed at the 1986, 1990, and 1994 Commonwealth Games.

Rees has won 24 Welsh National Badminton Championships titles, four singles, 17 doubles crowns and three mixed doubles titles.

He achieved 130 caps for Wales, and reached a career-high as world number 12. After he retired as badminton player, he went into coaching, becoming Welsh national coach and manager, in addition to being part of Great Britain coachinbg team at the 2000 Sydney Olympics.

== Achievements ==
=== European Championships ===
Men's doubles
Year	Venue	Partner	Opponent	Score	Result
1988	Badmintonsenteret; Kristiansand, Norway	(Wales) Lyndon Williams	(Denmark) Michael Kjeldsen (Denmark) Jens Peter Nierhoff	8–15, 7–15	Bronze

=== European Junior Championships ===
Men's doubles
Year	Venue	Partner	Opponent	Score	Result
1983	Helsinkian Sports Hall; Helsinki, Finland	(Wales) Lyndon Williams	(Denmark) Claus Thomsen (Denmark) Karsten Schultz	15–12, 18–16	Gold

=== IBF World Grand Prix ===
The World Badminton Grand Prix sanctioned by International Badminton Federation (IBF) since 1983.

Men's doubles
Year	Tournament	Partner	Opponent	Score	Result
1987	Scottish Open	(Wales) Lyndon Williams	(Denmark) Michael Kjeldsen (Denmark) Jens Peter Nierhoff	4–15, 4–15	(silver) Runner-up

=== IBF International ===
Men's singles
Year	Tournament	Opponent	Score	Result
1988	Norwegian International	(Netherlands) Uun Santosa	15–12, 15–10	(gold) Winner
1988	Welsh Open	(England) Darren Hall	5–15, 1–5 retired	(silver) Runner-up
1989	Irish International	(Scotland) Anthony Gallagher	16–18, 7–15	(silver) Runner-up
1989	Welsh International	(England) Matthew A. Smith	7–15, 18–14, 17–18	(silver) Runner-up

Men's doubles
Year	Tournament	Partner	Opponent	Score	Result
1986	Welsh Open	(Wales) Lyndon Williams	(England) Martin Dew (England) Darren Hall	7–15, 12–15	(silver) Runner-up
1988	Welsh Open	(England) Michael Adams	(England) Nick Ponting (England) Dave Wright	3–15, 15–10, 8–15	(silver) Runner-up
1991	Welsh International	(England) Michael Adams	(Canada) David Humble (Canada) Anil Kaul	15–11, 15–12	(gold) Winner
1992	Welsh International	(England) Michael Adams	(England) Nick Ponting (England) Dave Wright	9–15, 2–15	(silver) Runner-up

Mixed doubles
Year	Tournament	Partner	Opponent	Score	Result
1988	Norwegian International	(Wales) Sarah Doody	(Sweden) Christian Ljungmark (Sweden) Susanne Jacobsson	15–12, 17–18, 15–8	(gold) Winner
