= Badminton Wales =

Governing body of badminton in Wales

Welsh Badminton Union
- Sport: Badminton
- Jurisdiction: National
- Abbreviation: WBU
- Founded: 1928
- Affiliation: Badminton World Federation
- Affiliation date: 1934
- Regional affiliation: European Badminton Union
- Affiliation date: 1968
- Headquarters: Sport Wales National Centre
- Location: Sophia Gardens, Cardiff
- President: Dave Davies
- Chairman: Kerry Ann Sheppard
- CEO: Kelly Aston
- Coach: Chris Rees

Official website
- www.badminton.wales
- (Wales)

Badminton Wales (formerly Welsh Badminton Union or WBU) is the national governing body for badminton in Wales. Formed in 1928 as The Welsh Badminton Union, in 1934 it was one of the founder members of the Badminton World Federation. WBU became a member of the European Badminton Union in 1968 (now Badminton Europe). Over 90 senior clubs are affiliated to Welsh Badminton Union, and its membership is nearly 4000.

Wales competes in the European Championships, World Championships, Commonwealth Games and the Thomas and Uber Cup World Team Championships. WBC organises national and international competitions, including the Welsh National Badminton Championships and the Welsh International Badminton Championships, and manages the Wales representative squads internationally, at all levels.

Welsh Badminton players Kelly Morgan and Richard Vaughan represented Great Britain at the Sydney 2000 and Athens 2004 Olympics. Morgan also competed at the Atlanta 1996 Olympics.

Welsh Badminton Union relocated to the Sport Wales National Centre, Sophia Gardens, Cardiff from Cardiff Bay in January 2010.
