= Icelandic National Badminton Championships =

The Icelandic National Badminton Championships is a tournament organized to crown the best badminton players in Iceland. They are held since 1949.

== Past winners ==
Year	Men's singles	Women's singles	Men's doubles	Women's doubles	Mixed doubles
1949	Einar Jónsson	no competition	Friðrik Sigurbjörnsson; Guðjón Einarsson	no competition	no competition
1950	Ágúst Bjartmarz	Halla Árnadóttir	Georg L. Sveinsson; Jón Jóhannesson	Jakobína Jósefsdóttir; Unnur Briem	Georg L. Sveinsson; Unnur Briem
1951	Ágúst Bjartmarz	Halla Árnadóttir	Augustus Bjartmars; Ólafur Guðmundsson	Jakobína Jósefsdóttir; Unnur Briem	Þorgeir Ibsen; Halla Árnadóttir
1952	Wagner Walbom	Ebba Lárusdóttir	Einar Jónsson; Wagner Walbom	Grethe Zimsen; Ragna Hansen	Wagner Walbom; Unnur Briem
1953	Wagner Walbom	Ebba Lárusdóttir	Einar Jónsson; Wagner Walbom	Ebba Lárusdóttir; Ragna Hansen	Wagner Walbom; Unnur Briem
1954	Wagner Walbom	Ebba Lárusdóttir	Einar Jónsson; Wagner Walbom	Ebba Lárusdóttir; Ingveldur Sigurðardóttir	Wagner Walbom; Unnur Briem
1955	Wagner Walbom	Ebba Lárusdóttir	Einar Jónsson; Wagner Walbom	Ebba Lárusdóttir; Ragna Hansen	Wagner Walbom; Ellen Mogensen
1956	Ágúst Bjartmarz	Ebba Lárusdóttir	Einar Jónsson; Wagner Walbom	Ellen Mogensen; Júlíana Isebarn	Wagner Walbom; Ellen Mogensen
1957	Wagner Walbom	Ebba Lárusdóttir	Friðrik Sigurbjörnsson; Wagner Walbom	Ebba Lárusdóttir; Júlíana Isebarn	Wagner Walbom; Ellen Mogensen
1958	Ágúst Bjartmarz	Hansa Jónsdóttir	Thodir Jónsson; Wagner Walbom	Ragna Jónsdóttir; Rannveig Magnúsdóttir	August Bjartmars; Hansa Jónsdóttir
1959	Ágúst Bjartmarz	Jónína Nieljóhníusardóttir	Einar Jónsson; Óskar Guðmundsson	Hulda Guðmundsdóttir; Rannveig Magnúsdóttir	Wagner Walbom; Halldóra Thoroddsen
1960	Óskar Guðmundsson	Jónína Nieljóhníusardóttir	Lárus Guðmundsson; Ragnar Thorsteinsson	Jónína Nieljóhníusardóttir; Sig. Gudmundsdottir	Þorvaldur Ásgeirsson; Lovísa Sigurðardóttir
1961	Óskar Guðmundsson	Lovísa Sigurðardóttir	Lárus Guðmundsson; Ragnar Thorsteinsson	Hulda Guðmundsdóttir; Rannveig Magnúsdóttir	Wagner Walbom; Júlíana Isebarn
1962	Jón Árnason	Lovísa Sigurðardóttir	Einar Jónsson; Wagner Walbom	Halldóra Thoroddsen; Lovísa Sigurðardóttir	Lárus Guðmundsson; Jónína Nieljóhníusardóttir
1963	Óskar Guðmundsson	no competition	Lárus Guðmundsson; Ragnar Thorsteinsson	Halldóra Thoroddsen; Jónína Nieljóhníusardóttir	Óskar Guðmundsson; Halldóra Thoroddsen
1964	Óskar Guðmundsson	no competition	Garðar Alfonsson; Óskar Guðmundsson	Halldóra Thoroddsen; Jónína Nieljóhníusardóttir	Óskar Guðmundsson; Hulda Guðmundsdóttir
1965	Óskar Guðmundsson	no competition	Óskar Guðmundsson; Rafn Viggósson	Hulda Guðmundsdóttir; Jónína Nieljóhníusardóttir	Lárus Guðmundsson; Jónína Nieljóhníusardóttir
1966	Jón Árnason	no competition	Jón Árnason; Óskar Guðmundsson	Hulda Guðmundsdóttir; Lovísa Sigurðardóttir	Jón Árnason; Lovísa Sigurðardóttir
1967	Jón Árnason	no competition	Jón Árnason; Viðar Guðjónsson	Hulda Guðmundsdóttir; Lovísa Sigurðardóttir	Jón Árnason; Lovísa Sigurðardóttir
1968	Óskar Guðmundsson	no competition	Jón Árnason; Viðar Guðjónsson	Hulda Guðmundsdóttir; Rannveig Magnúsdóttir	Lárus Guðmundsson; Jónína Nieljóhníusardóttir
1969	Óskar Guðmundsson	no competition	Friðleifur Stefánsson; Óskar Guðmundsson	Hulda Guðmundsdóttir; Lovísa Sigurðardóttir	Jón Árnason; Lovísa Sigurðardóttir
1970	Óskar Guðmundsson	no competition	Haraldur Kornelíusson; Steinar Petersen	Jónína Nieljóhníusardóttir; Rannveig Magnúsdóttir	Haraldur Kornelíusson; Hann Lára Köhler
1971	Haraldur Kornelíusson	no competition	Jón Árnason; Vidar GudJónsson	Hann Lára Köhler; Lovísa Sigurðardóttir	Haraldur Kornelíusson; Hann Lára Köhler
1972	Haraldur Kornelíusson	no competition	Haraldur Kornelíusson; Steinar Petersen	Hann Lára Palsdóttir; Lovísa Sigurðardóttir	Haraldur Kornelíusson; Hann Lára Palsdóttir
1973	Haraldur Kornelíusson	no competition	Haraldur Kornelíusson; Steinar Petersen	Hann Lára Palsdóttir; Lovísa Sigurðardóttir	Haraldur Kornelíusson; Hann Lára Palsdóttir
1974	Haraldur Kornelíusson	Lovísa Sigurðardóttir	Haraldur Kornelíusson; Steinar Peterson	Hann Lára Palsdóttir; Lovísa Sigurðardóttir	Haraldur Kornelíusson; Hann Lára Palsdóttir
1975	Haraldur Kornelíusson	Lovísa Sigurðardóttir	Haraldur Kornelíusson; Steinar Peterson	Hann Lára Palsdóttir; Lovísa Sigurðardóttir	Haraldur Kornelíusson; Hann Lára Palsdóttir
1976	Sigurður Haraldsson	Lovísa Sigurðardóttir	Jóhann Kjartansson; Sigurður Haraldsson	Hann Lára Palsdóttir; Lovísa Sigurðardóttir	Steinar Petersen; Lovísa Sigurðardóttir
1977	Sigurður Haraldsson	Lovísa Sigurðardóttir	Jóhann Kjartansson; Sigurður Haraldsson	Hann Lára Palsdóttir; Lovísa Sigurðardóttir	Sigurður Haraldsson; Hann Lára Palsdóttir
1978	Jóhann Kjartansson	Kristín Magnúsdóttir	Jóhann Kjartansson; Sigurður Haraldsson	Hann Lára Palsdóttir; Lovísa Sigurðardóttir	Jóhann Kjartansson; Kristín Berglind Kristjánsdóttir
1979	Jóhann Kjartansson	Kristín Magnúsdóttir	Sigurður Kolbeinsson; Sigfús Ægir Árnason	Kristín Magnúsdóttir; Kristín Berglind Kristjánsdóttir	Jóhann Kjartansson; Kristín Berglind Kristjánsdóttir
1980	Broddi Kristjánsson	Kristín Magnúsdóttir	Jóhann Kjartansson; Broddi Kristjánsson	Kristín Magnúsdóttir; Kristín Berglind Kristjánsdóttir	Haraldur Kornelíusson; Lovísa Sigurðardóttir
1981	Broddi Kristjánsson	Kristín Magnúsdóttir	Jóhann Kjartansson; Broddi Kristjánsson	Kristín Magnúsdóttir; Kristín Berglind Kristjánsdóttir	Jóhann Kjartansson; Kristín Berglind Kristjánsdóttir
1982	Broddi Kristjánsson	Þórdís Edwald	Guðmundur Adolfsson; Broddi Kristjánsson	Kristín Magnúsdóttir; Kristín Berglind Kristjánsdóttir	Broddi Kristjánsson; Kristina Magnúsdóttir
1983	Broddi Kristjánsson	Kristín Magnúsdóttir	Sigfús Ægir Árnason; Víðir Bragason	Kristín Magnúsdóttir; Kristín Berglind Kristjánsdóttir	Broddi Kristjánsson; Kristina Magnúsdóttir
1984	Broddi Kristjánsson	Kristín Magnúsdóttir	Þorsteinn Páll Hængsson; Broddi Kristjánsson	Þórdís Edwald; Elísabet Þórðardóttir	Broddi Kristjánsson; Kristina Magnúsdóttir
1985	Guðmundur Adolfsson	Þórdís Edwald	Þorsteinn Páll Hængsson; Broddi Kristjánsson	Þórdís Edwald; Elísabet Þórðardóttir	Broddi Kristjánsson; Kristina Magnúsdóttir
1986	Broddi Kristjánsson	Elisabeth Thordasdottir	Þorsteinn Páll Hængsson; Broddi Kristjánsson	Þórdís Edwald; Elísabet Þórðardóttir	Broddi Kristjánsson; Kristina Magnúsdóttir
1987	Þorsteinn Páll Hængsson	Þórdís Edwald	Þorsteinn Páll Hængsson; Broddi Kristjánsson	Þórdís Edwald; Elísabet Þórðardóttir	Þorsteinn Páll Hængsson; Þórdís Edwald
1988	Broddi Kristjánsson	Þórdís Edwald	Árni Þór Hallgrímsson; Ármann Þorvaldsson	Þórdís Edwald; Elísabet Þórðardóttir	Árni Þór Hallgrímsson; Elísabet Þórðardóttir
1989	Broddi Kristjánsson	Þórdís Edwald	Árni Þór Hallgrímsson; Ármann Þorvaldsson	Guðrún Júlíusdóttir; Kristín Magnúsdóttir	Guðmundur Adolfsson; Guðrún Júlíusdóttir
1990	Broddi Kristjánsson	Þórdís Edwald	Broddi Kristjánsson; Þorsteinn Páll Hængsson	Guðrún Júlíusdóttir; Birna Petersen	Guðmundur Adolfsson; Guðrún Júlíusdóttir
1991	Árni Þór Hallgrímsson	Elsa Nielsen	Broddi Kristjánsson; Árni Þór Hallgrímsson	Guðrún Júlíusdóttir; Birna Petersen	Árni Þór Hallgrímsson; Guðrún Júlíusdóttir
1992	Broddi Kristjánsson	Elsa Nielsen	Broddi Kristjánsson; Árni Þór Hallgrímsson	Guðrún Júlíusdóttir; Birna Petersen	Broddi Kristjánsson; Ása Pálsdóttir
1993	Broddi Kristjánsson	Elsa Nielsen	Broddi Kristjánsson; Árni Þór Hallgrímsson	Guðrún Júlíusdóttir; Birna Petersen	Árni Þór Hallgrímsson; Guðrún Júlíusdóttir
1994	Þorsteinn Páll Hængsson	Elsa Nielsen	Broddi Kristjánsson; Árni Þór Hallgrímsson	Þórdís Edwald; Elsa Nielsen	Broddi Kristjánsson; Elsa Nielsen
1995	Broddi Kristjánsson	Elsa Nielsen	Broddi Kristjánsson; Árni Þór Hallgrímsson	Elsa Nielsen; Vigdís Ásgeirsdóttir	Árni Þór Hallgrímsson; Guðrún Júlíusdóttir
1996	Tryggvi Nielsen	Vigdís Ásgeirsdóttir	Broddi Kristjánsson; Árni Þór Hallgrímsson	Elsa Nielsen; Vigdís Ásgeirsdóttir	Broddi Kristjánsson; Elsa Nielsen
1997	Tryggvi Nielsen	Vigdís Ásgeirsdóttir	Broddi Kristjánsson; Árni Þór Hallgrímsson	Elsa Nielsen; Vigdís Ásgeirsdóttir	Árni Þór Hallgrímsson; Vigdís Ásgeirsdóttir
1998	Broddi Kristjánsson	Elsa Nielsen	Broddi Kristjánsson; Árni Þór Hallgrímsson	Elsa Nielsen; Vigdís Ásgeirsdóttir	Árni Þór Hallgrímsson; Drífa Harðardóttir
1999	Tómas Viborg	Elsa Nielsen	Broddi Kristjánsson; Guthmundur Adolfsson	Elsa Nielsen; Brynja K. Pétursdóttir	Broddi Kristjánsson; Drífa Harðardóttir
2000	Tómas Viborg	Elsa Nielsen	Sveinn Logi Sölvason; Tryggvi Nilsen	Elsa Nielsen; Brynja K. Pétursdóttir	Tomas Viborg; Brynja K. Pétursdóttir
2001	Tómas Viborg	Brynja Petusdottir	Sveinn Logi Sölvason; Tryggvi Nilsen	Vigdís Ásgeirsdóttir; Ragna Ingólfsdóttir	Tomas Viborg; Brynja K. Pétursdóttir
2002	Broddi Kristjánsson	Sara Jónsdóttir	Tryggvi Nielsen; Svein Sölvasson	Ragna Ingólfsdóttir; Vidís Asgeirsdottir	Tryggvi Nielsen; Elsa Nielsen
2003	Sveinn Logi Sölvason	Ragna Ingólfsdóttir	Broddi Kristjánsson; Helgi Jóhannesson	Ragna Ingólfsdóttir; Katrín Atladóttir	Sveinn Logi Sölvason; Drífa Harðardóttir
2004	Tryggvi Nielsen	Ragna Ingólfsdóttir	Tryggvi Nielsen; Sveinn Sölvason	Drífa Hardardottir; Sara Jónsdóttir	Sveinn Logi Sölvason; Drífa Harðardóttir
2005	Helgi Jóhannesson	Ragna Ingólfsdóttir	Broddi Kristjánsson; Helgi Jóhannesson	Sara Jónsdóttir; Ragna Ingólfsdóttir	Magnús Ingi Helgason; Tinna Helgadóttir
2006	Helgi Jóhannesson	Ragna Ingólfsdóttir	Broddi Kristjánsson; Helgi Jóhannesson	Ragna Ingólfsdóttir; Katrín Atladóttir	Helgi Jóhannesson; Drífa Harðardóttir
2007	Magnús Ingi Helgason	Ragna Ingólfsdóttir	Helgi Jóhannesson; Magnús Ingi Helgason	Ragna Ingólfsdóttir; Katrín Atladóttir	Helgi Jóhannesson; Ragna Ingólfsdóttir
2008	Helgi Jóhannesson	Ragna Ingólfsdóttir	Helgi Jóhannesson; Magnús Ingi Helgason	Ragna Ingólfsdóttir; Katrín Atladóttir	Magnús Ingi Helgason; Tinna Helgadóttir
2009	Helgi Jóhannesson	Tinna Helgadóttir	Helgi Jóhannesson; Magnús Ingi Helgason	Erla Björg Hafsteinsdóttir; Tinna Helgadóttir	Magnús Ingi Helgason; Tinna Helgadóttir
2010	Helgi Jóhannesson	Ragna Ingólfsdóttir	Helgi Jóhannesson; Magnús Ingi Helgason	Ragna Ingólfsdóttir; Katrín Atladóttir	Magnús Ingi Helgason; Tinna Helgadóttir
2011	Magnús Ingi Helgason	Ragna Ingólfsdóttir	Helgi Jóhannesson; Magnús Ingi Helgason	Ragna Ingólfsdóttir; Katrín Atladóttir	Magnús Ingi Helgason; Tinna Helgadóttir
2012	Kári Gunnarsson	Ragna Ingólfsdóttir	Helgi Jóhannesson; Magnús Ingi Helgason	Ragna Ingólfsdóttir; Katrín Atladóttir	Atli Jóhannesson; Snjólaug Jóhannsdóttir
2013	Kári Gunnarsson	Tinna Helgadóttir	Helgi Jóhannesson; Magnús Ingi Helgason	Rakel Jóhannesdóttir; Elín Þóra Elíasdóttir	Magnús Ingi Helgason; Tinna Helgadóttir
2014	Kári Gunnarsson	Tinna Helgadóttir	Atli Jóhannesson; Kári Gunnarsson	Erla Björg Hafsteinsdóttir; Tinna Helgadóttir	Magnús Ingi Helgason; Tinna Helgadóttir
2015	Kári Gunnarsson	Tinna Helgadóttir	Atli Jóhannesson; Kári Gunnarsson	Drífa Harðardóttir; Tinna Helgadóttir	Daniel Thomsen; Margret Johannsdottir
2016	Kári Gunnarsson	Margrét Jóhannsdóttir	Atli Jóhannesson; Kári Gunnarsson	Drífa Harðardóttir; Tinna Helgadóttir	Daniel Thomsen; Margret Johannsdottir
2017	Kári Gunnarsson	Margrét Jóhannsdóttir	Davíð Bjarni Björnsson; Kristófer Darri Finnsson	Margret Johannsdottir; Sigríður Árnadóttir	Daniel Thomsen; Margret Johannsdottir
2018	Kári Gunnarsson	Margrét Jóhannsdóttir	Daníel Jóhannesson; Jónas Baldursson	Margret Johannsdottir; Sigríður Árnadóttir	Kristófer Darri Finnsson; Erla Björg Hafsteinsdóttir
2019	Kári Gunnarsson	Margrét Jóhannsdóttir	Davíð Bjarni Björnsson; Kristófer Darri Finnsson	Drífa Harðardóttir; Erla Björg Hafsteinsdóttir	Kristófer Darri Finnsson; Margrét Jóhannsdóttir
2020	Kári Gunnarsson	Margrét Jóhannsdóttir	Davíð Bjarni Björnsson; Kristófer Darri Finnsson	Margrét Jóhannsdóttir; Sigríður Árnadóttir	Kristófer Darri Finnsson; Drífa Harðardóttir
2021	Daníel Jóhannesson	Júlíana Karitas Jóhannsdóttir	Davíð Bjarni Björnsson; Kristófer Darri Finnsson	Drífa Harðardóttir; Elsa Nielsen	Kristófer Darri Finnsson; Drífa Harðardóttir
2022	Daníel Jóhannesson	Júlíana Karitas Jóhannsdóttir	Davíð Bjarni Björnsson; Kristófer Darri Finnsson	Arna Karen Jóhannsdóttir; Sigríður Árnadóttir	Kristófer Darri Finnsson; Drífa Harðardóttir
2023	Daníel Jóhannesson	Gerda Voitechovskaja	Davíð Bjarni Björnsson; Kristófer Darri Finnsson	Arna Karen Jóhannsdóttir; Sigríður Árnadóttir	Davíð Bjarni Björnsson; Arna Karen Jóhannsdóttir
2024	Kári Gunnarsson	Gerda Voitechovskaja	Davíð Bjarni Björnsson; Kristófer Darri Finnsson	Drífa Harðardóttir; Gerda Voitechovskaja	Davíð Bjarni Björnsson; Arna Karen Jóhannsdóttir
2025	Gústav Nilsson	Gerda Voitechovskaja	Davíð Bjarni Björnsson; Kristófer Darri Finnsson	Arna Karen Jóhannsdóttir; Sigríður Árnadóttir	Kristófer Darri Finnsson; Drífa Harðardóttir
