= 1990 Thomas Cup qualification =

Tournament details
- Dates: 18 – 25 February 1990
- Location: Asian zone: Kuala Lumpur; European zone: Villach

The qualifying process for the 1990 Thomas Cup took place from 18 to 25 February 1990 to decide the final teams which will play in the final tournament.

== Qualification process ==
The qualification process was divided into two regions, the Asian Zone and the European Zone. Seeded teams received a bye into the second round while unseeded teams competed in the first round for a place in the second round. The first two rounds were played in a round-robin format. Teams in the second round competed for a place in the knockout stages. Semi-final winners in each zone were guaranteed qualification for the final tournament to be held in Nagoya and Tokyo while the remaining teams competed in a third place playoff match for a place in the final tournament.

China qualified for the final tournament as defending champions while Japan qualified as hosts.

=== Qualified teams ===
Country	Qualified as	Qualified on	Final appearance
Japan	1990 Thomas Cup hosts	28 November 1988	6th
China	1988 Thomas Cup winners	4 June 1988	5th
Indonesia	Asian Zone winners	25 February 1990	13th
Malaysia	Asian Zone runners-up	25 February 1990	13th
South Korea	Third place in Asian Zone	25 February 1990	4th
Denmark	European Zone winners	25 February 1990	16th
Sweden	European Zone runners-up	25 February 1990	4th
England	Third place in European Zone	25 February 1990	5th

== Asian Zone ==
The qualification rounds for the Asian Zone were held from 18 to 25 February at Stadium Negara in Kuala Lumpur, Malaysia. Sixteen teams took part in qualifying for the final tournament, with Macau making their debut in the tournament.

=== First round ===
==== Group A ====
Pos	Team	Pld	W	L	MF	MA	MD	Pts	Qualification
1	Hong Kong	2	2	0	10	0	+10	2	Advance to second round
2	Myanmar	2	1	1	4	6	−2	1	
3	Nepal (Note: Nepal were moved up from Group B to Group A following the withdrawals of Brunei and Zambia.)	2	0	2	1	9	−8	0	
4	Brunei	0	0	0	0	0	0	0	Withdrew
5	Zambia	0	0	0	0	0	0	0	Withdrew

Source: New Straits Times
Notes:

Hong Kong
5
Stadium Negara
18 February 1990

Nepal
0

		Result
1	Tse Bun	2 – 0 (15–7, 15–7)	Anoj Basnet
2	Chan Kin Ngai	2 – 0 (15–1, 15–8)	Pratap Adhikari
3	Chan Siu Kwong	2 – 0 (15–3, 15–2)	Ramji Bahadur Shrestha
4	Chan Kin Ngai; Chan Siu Kwong	2 – 0 (15–1, 15–6)	Pratap Adhikari; Anoj Basnet
5	Ng Pak Kum; Wong Wai Lap	2 – 0 (15–5, 15–5)	Ramji Bahadur Shrestha; Naresh Bahadur Singh

Hong Kong
5
Stadium Negara
18 February 1990

Myanmar
0

		Result
1	Tse Bun	2 – 0 (15–4, 15–4)	Tun Htein Win
2	Chan Kin Ngai	2 – 0 (15–4, 15–2)	Myo Thant
3	Chan Siu Kwong	2 – 0 (15–8, 15–5)	Maung Maung
4	Chan Chi Choi; Chan Siu Kwong	2 – 0 (15–9, 15–7)	Maung Maung; Tun Htein Win
5	Ng Pak Kum; Wong Wai Lap	2 – 0 (15–2, 12–15, 15–12)	Myint Han; Myo Thant

Nepal
1
Stadium Negara
19 February 1988

Myanmar
4

		Result
1	Anoj Basnet	0 – 2 (8–15, 4–15)	Tun Htein Win
2	Pratap Adhikari	2 – 0 (15–2, 15–7)	Myo Thant
3	Ramji Bahadur Shrestha	0 – 2 (5–15, 1–15)	Maung Maung
4	Pratap Adhikari; Anoj Basnet	0 – 2 (3–15, 6–15)	Maung Maung; Tun Htein Win
5	Ramji Bahadur Shrestha; Naresh Bahadur Singh	0 – 2 (6–15, 6–15)	Myint Han; Myo Thant

==== Group B ====
Pos	Team	Pld	W	L	MF	MA	MD	Pts	Qualification
1	Chinese Taipei	3	3	0	15	0	+15	3	Advance to second round
2	Mexico	3	2	1	9	6	+3	2	
3	Mauritius	3	1	2	4	11	−7	1	
4	Macau	3	0	3	2	13	−11	0	

Source: New Straits Times

Chinese Taipei
5
Stadium Negara
18 February 1990

Mauritius
0

		Result
1	Liu En-hung	2 – 0 (15–1, 15–0)	Geenesh Dussain
2	Lee Mou-chou	2 – 0 (15–5, 15–1)	Stellio Chiong
3	Chen Neng-piao	2 – 0 (15–2, 15–3)	Jean-Michel Duverge
4	Ger Shin-ming; Yang Shih-jeng	2 – 0 (15–6, 15–2)	Gilles Allet; Geenesh Dussain
5	Lee Jen-yuan; Sun Bing-shian	2 – 0 (15–5, 15–2)	Stellio Chiong; Jean-Michel Duverge

Mexico
5
Stadium Negara
18 February 1990

Macau
0

		Result
1	Fernando de la Torre	2 – 0 (15–2, 15–1)	Sam Kai Chong
2	Eugenio Tapia	2 – 0 (15–8, 15–2)	Mak Weng Heng
3	Ernesto de la Torre	2 – 0 (15–8, 15–10)	Teng Shin Ee
4	Ernesto de la Torre; Fernando de la Torre	2 – 0 (15–1, 15–3)	Mak Weng Heng; Sam Kai Chong
5	Lorenzo Ruiz; Eugenio Tapia	2 – 0 (15–1, 15–9)	Chan Kam Pao; Manuel Jose da Rosa

Mauritius
3
Stadium Negara
18 February 1990

Macau
2

		Result
1	Geenesh Dussain	2 – 0 (18–15, 15–10)	Sam Kai Chong
2	Stellio Chiong	0 – 2 (4–15, 4–15)	Mak Weng Heng
3	Jean-Michel Duverge	2 – 1 (15–9, 11–15, 15–5)	Teng Shin Ee
4	Gilles Allet; Geenesh Dussain	1 – 2 (10–15, 18–17, 14–18)	Mak Weng Heng; Sam Kai Chong
5	Stellio Chiong; Jean-Michel Duverge	2 – 1 (6–15, 15–9, 18–13)	Chan Kam Pao; Manuel Jose da Rosa

Chinese Taipei
5
Stadium Negara
18 February 1990

Macau
0

		Result
1	Liu En-hung	2 – 0 (15–0, 15–0)	Sam Kai Chong
2	Lee Mou-chou	2 – 0 (15–3, 15–2)	Mak Weng Heng
3	Chen Neng-piao	2 – 0 (15–1, 15–0)	Teng Shin Ee
4	Ger Shin-ming; Yang Shih-jeng	2 – 0 (15–2, 15–1)	Mak Weng Heng; Sam Kai Chong
5	Lee Jen-yuan; Sun Bing-shian	2 – 0 (15–4, 15–3)	Chan Kam Pao; Manuel Jose da Rosa

Mexico
4
Stadium Negara
19 February 1990

Mauritius
1

		Result
1	Fernando de la Torre	2 – 0 (15–6, 15–5)	Geenesh Dussain
2	Eugenio Tapia	1 – 2 (16–18, 15–7, 15–17)	Jean-Michel Duverge
3	Ernesto de la Torre	2 – 0 (15–11, 15–1)	Gilles Allet
4	Ernesto de la Torre; Fernando de la Torre	2 – 0 (15–7, 15–12)	Gilles Allet; Geenesh Dussain
5	Lorenzo Ruiz; Eugenio Tapia	2 – 0 (15–8, 15–2)	Stellio Chiong; Jean-Michel Duverge

Chinese Taipei
5
Stadium Negara
19 February 1990

Mexico
0

		Result
1	Liu En-hung	2 – 0 (15–1, 15–6)	Fernando de la Torre
2	Lee Mou-chou	2 – 0 (15–12, 15–0)	Ernesto de la Torre
3	Chen Neng-piao	2 – 0 (15–5, 15–4)	Lorenzo Ruiz
4	Ger Shin-ming; Yang Shih-jeng	2 – 0 (15–5, 15–1)	Ernesto de la Torre; Fernando de la Torre
5	Lee Jen-yuan; Sun Bing-shian	2 – 0 (15–5, 15–6)	Lorenzo Ruiz; Eugenio Tapia

==== Group C ====
Pos	Team	Pld	W	L	MF	MA	MD	Pts	Qualification
1	New Zealand (Note: New Zealand advanced to the second round by head-to-head difference in group matches between Australia.)	3	2	1	10	5	+5	2	Advance to second round
2	Australia	3	2	1	12	3	+9	2	
3	Sri Lanka	3	1	2	5	10	−5	1	
4	Singapore	3	1	2	3	12	−9	1	

Source: New Straits Times
Notes:

Australia
2
Stadium Negara
18 February 1990

New Zealand
3

		Result
1	Wei Yan	2 – 0 (17–15, 15–6)	Glenn Stewart
2	Dennis Todd	1 – 2 (18–17, 6–15, 7–15)	Kerrin Harrison
3	Paul Stevenson	2 – 0 (15–10, 15–8)	Dean Galt
4	Peter Blackburn; Gordon Lang	1 – 2 (9–15, 17–16, 11–15)	Kerrin Harrison; Philip Horne
5	Paul Stevenson; Wei Yan	0 – 2 (12–15, 11–15)	Graeme Robson; Glenn Stewart

Singapore
3
Stadium Negara
18 February 1990

Sri Lanka
2

		Result
1	Donald Koh	1 – 2 (8–15, 18–17, 9–15)	Niroshan Wijekoon
2	You Kok Kiong	2 – 1 (12–15, 15–2, 15–11)	Nishantha Jayasinghe
3	Lee Suan Soon	2 – 1 (15–9, 9–15, 15–9)	Duminda Jayakody
4	Abdul Hamid Khan; Lim Boon Leng	2 – 0 (15–4, 15–11)	Niroshan Wijekoon; Niranjan Wijesekera
5	Lee Suan Soon; Yow Chong Liang	0 – 2 (9–15, 12–15)	Duminda Jayakody; Harshan Yakeem

Singapore
0
Stadium Negara
18 February 1990

New Zealand
5

		Result
1	Donald Koh	0 – 2 (7–15, 4–15)	Glenn Stewart
2	You Kok Kiong	0 – 2 (7–15, 2–15)	Kerrin Harrison
3	Lee Suan Soon	0 – 2 (7–15, 8–15)	Dean Galt
4	Abdul Hamid Khan; Lim Boon Leng	0 – 2 (2–15, 7–15)	Kerrin Harrison; Philip Horne
5	Lee Suan Soon; Yow Chong Liang	0 – 2 (10–15, 7–15)	Graeme Robson; Glenn Stewart

Australia
5
Stadium Negara
18 February 1990

Sri Lanka
0

		Result
1	Wei Yan	2 – 0 (15–12, 15–2)	Niroshan Wijekoon
2	Dennis Todd	2 – 0 (15–9, 15–12)	Nishantha Jayasinghe
3	Paul Stevenson	2 – 0 (15–10, 15–6)	Duminda Jayakody
4	Peter Blackburn; Gordon Lang	2 – 0 (15–4, 15–12)	Niroshan Wijekoon; Niranjan Wijesekera
5	Paul Stevenson; Wei Yan	2 – 1 (15–8, 12–15, 15–5)	Duminda Jayakody; Harshan Yakeem

Australia
5
Stadium Negara
19 February 1990

Singapore
0

		Result
1	Wei Yan	2 – 0 (15–6, 15–11)	Donald Koh
2	Dennis Todd	2 – 0 (15–9, 15–2)	You Kok Kiong
3	Paul Stevenson	2 – 0 (15–1, 15–4)	Yow Chong Liang
4	Peter Blackburn; Gordon Lang	2 – 0 (15–8, 15–5)	Abdul Hamid Khan; Lim Boon Leng
5	Paul Stevenson; Dennis Todd	2 – 1 (15–3, 15–3)	Lee Suan Soon; You Kok Kiong

New Zealand
2
Stadium Negara
19 February 1990

Sri Lanka
3

		Result
1	Glenn Stewart	0 – 2 (6–15, 11–15)	Niroshan Wijekoon
2	Kerrin Harrison	2 – 0 (15–8, 15–3)	Nishantha Jayasinghe
3	Nick Hall	1 – 2 (17–14, 13–18, 11–15)	Duminda Jayakody
4	Philip Horne; Graeme Robson	2 – 0 (15–8, 15–5)	Niroshan Wijekoon; Niranjan Wijesekera
5	Dean Galt; Nick Hall	1 – 2 (12–15, 17–16, 4–15)	Duminda Jayakody; Harshan Yakeem

=== Second round ===
==== Group X ====
Pos	Team	Pld	W	L	MF	MA	MD	Pts	Qualification
1	Malaysia	3	3	0	13	2	+11	3	Advance to knockout stage
2	Thailand	3	2	1	10	5	+5	2	Advance to knockout stage
3	Chinese Taipei	3	1	2	7	8	−1	1	
4	New Zealand	3	0	3	0	15	−15	0	

Source: New Straits Times

Malaysia
4
Stadium Negara
21 February 1990

Chinese Taipei
1

		Result
1	Foo Kok Keong	2 – 0 (15–9, 15–7)	Liu En-hung
2	Rashid Sidek	2 – 0 (15–4, 15–9)	Lee Mou-chou
3	Wong Tat Meng	1 – 2 (13–15, 15–6, 11–15)	Chen Neng-piao
4	Jalani Sidek; Razif Sidek	2 – 0 (15–0, 15–2)	Ger Shin-ming; Yang Shih-jeng
5	Cheah Soon Kit; Soo Beng Kiang	2 – 0 (15–5, 15–9)	Lee Jen-yuan; Sun Bing-shian

Thailand
5
Stadium Negara
21 February 1990

New Zealand
0

		Result
1	Sompol Kukasemkij	2 – 0 (18–16, 15–2)	Glenn Stewart
2	Karoon Kasayapanan	2 – 0 (17–15, 15–3)	Graeme Robson
3	Surachai Makkasasithorn	2 – 0 (15–9, 15–3)	Dean Galt
4	Sawei Chanseorasmee; Pramote Teerawiwatana	2 – 0 (15–3, 15–7)	Kerrin Harrison; Philip Horne
5	Komchan Promsarin; Siripong Siripool	2 – 0 (15–6, 15–2)	Dean Galt; Graeme Robson

Malaysia
5
Stadium Negara
22 February 1990

New Zealand
0

		Result
1	Foo Kok Keong	2 – 0 (15–11, 15–3)	Glenn Stewart
2	Rashid Sidek	0 – 0 (12–1^{r})	Kerrin Harrison
3	Kwan Yoke Meng	2 – 0 (15–7, 15–3)	Nick Hall
4	Jalani Sidek; Razif Sidek	2 – 0 (15–4, 15–6)	Philip Horne; Graeme Robson
5	Cheah Soon Kit; Soo Beng Kiang	2 – 0 (15–2, 15–5)	Dean Galt; Nick Hall

Thailand
4
Stadium Negara
22 February 1990

Chinese Taipei
1

		Result
1	Sompol Kukasemkij	2 – 0 (15–9, 15–4)	Liu En-hung
2	Karoon Kasayapanan	2 – 0 (15–6, 15–10)	Lee Mou-chou
3	Surachai Makkasasithorn	2 – 1 (15–4, 14–18, 15–5)	Chen Neng-piao
4	Sawei Chanseorasmee; Sakrapee Thongsari	0 – 0 (3^{r}–1)	Ger Shin-ming; Sun Bing-shian
5	Siripong Siripool; Pramote Teerawiwatana	2 – 0 (15–3, 17–15)	Lee Jen-yuan; Yang Shih-jeng

Malaysia
4
Stadium Negara
23 February 1990

Thailand
1

		Result
1	Foo Kok Keong	1 – 2 (11–15, 15–11, 9–15)	Sompol Kukasemkij
2	Rashid Sidek	2 – 0 (15–7, 15–0)	Karoon Kasayapanan
3	Kwan Yoke Meng	2 – 0 (15–12, 15–12)	Surachai Makkasasithorn
4	Jalani Sidek; Razif Sidek	2 – 0 (15–2, 15–7)	Komchan Promsarin; Pramote Teerawiwatana
5	Cheah Soon Kit; Soo Beng Kiang	2 – 0 (15–2, 15–10)	Sawei Chanseorasmee; Siripong Siripool

Chinese Taipei
5
Stadium Negara
23 February 1990

New Zealand
0

		Result
1	Liu En-hung	2 – 1 (9–15, 15–12, 15–11)	Glenn Stewart
2	Chen Neng-piao	2 – 0 (15–9, 15–11)	Graeme Robson
3	Lin Wei-chen	2 – 0 (9–15, 15–11, 15–6)	Philip Horne
4	Ger Shin-ming; Yang Shih-jeng	2 – 0 (15–11, 15–7)	Graeme Robson; Glenn Stewart
5	Lee Jen-yuan; Sun Bing-shian	2 – 0 (15–11, 15–9)	Dean Galt; Nick Hall

==== Group Y ====
Pos	Team	Pld	W	L	MF	MA	MD	Pts	Qualification
1	Indonesia	3	3	0	15	0	+15	3	Advance to knockout stage
2	South Korea	3	2	1	10	5	+5	2	Advance to knockout stage
3	India	3	1	2	3	10	−7	1	
4	Hong Kong	3	0	3	2	13	−11	0	

Source: New Straits Times

Indonesia
5
Stadium Negara
21 February 1990

India
0

		Result
1	Alan Budikusuma	2 – 0 (17–14, 15–8)	U. Vimal Kumar
2	Eddy Kurniawan	2 – 0 (15–6, 15–5)	Praveen Kumar
3	Ardy Wiranata	2 – 0 (15–4, 15–8)	Rajeev Bagga
4	Gunawan; Eddy Hartono	2 – 0 (15–1, 15–5)	Partho Ganguli; Vikram Singh
5	Richard Mainaky; Icuk Sugiarto	2 – 0 (15–0, 15–1)	Rajeev Bagga; Praveen Kumar

South Korea
5
Stadium Negara
21 February 1990

Hong Kong
0

		Result
1	Kim Hak-kyun	2 – 0 (15–9, 15–0)	Tse Bun
2	Sung Han-kook	2 – 0 (15–10, 15–3)	Chan Kin Ngai
3	Ahn Jae-chang	2 – 0 (15–8, 17–15)	Wong Wai Lap
4	Park Joo-bong; Shon Jin-hwan	2 – 0 (15–1, 15–3)	Chan Chi Choi; Chan Siu Kwong
5	Choi Sang-bum; Kim Moon-soo	2 – 0 (15–2, 15–11)	Ng Pak Kum; Wong Wai Lap

Indonesia
5
Stadium Negara
22 February 1990

Hong Kong
0

		Result
1	Alan Budikusuma	2 – 0 (15–6, 15–2)	Tse Bun
2	Ardy Wiranata	2 – 0 (15–8, 15–2)	Chan Kin Ngai
3	Joko Suprianto	2 – 0 (15–2, 15–6)	Wong Wai Lap
4	Gunawan; Eddy Hartono	2 – 0 (15–8, 15–7)	Chan Chi Choi; Chan Siu Kwong
5	Richard Mainaky; Icuk Sugiarto	2 – 0 (15–6, 15–7)	Ng Pak Kum; Wong Wai Lap

South Korea
5
Stadium Negara
22 February 1990

India
0

		Result
1	Kim Hak-kyun	2 – 0 (15–8, 15–6)	U. Vimal Kumar
2	Choi Sang-bum	2 – 0 (15–3, 15–3)	Praveen Kumar
3	Park Joo-bong	2 – 0 (15–6, 15–5)	Rajeev Bagga
4	Kim Moon-soo; Park Joo-bong	2 – 0 (15–3, 15–0)	Partho Ganguli; Vikram Singh
5	Shon Jin-hwan; Sung Han-kook	2 – 0 (15–2, 15–6)	Rajeev Bagga; Praveen Kumar

Indonesia
5
Stadium Negara
23 February 1990

South Korea
0

		Result
1	Alan Budikusuma	2 – 0 (15–5, 15–8)	Choi Sang-bum
2	Eddy Kurniawan	2 – 0 (15–7, 15–5)	Ahn Jae-chang
3	Ardy Wiranata	2 – 0 (15–5, 15–0)	Shon Jin-hwan
4	Gunawan; Eddy Hartono	2 – 0 (15–4, 15–4)	Kim Moon-soo; Sung Han-kook
5	Richard Mainaky; Icuk Sugiarto	2 – 0 (15–7, 15–9)	Ahn Jae-chang; Park Joo-bong

India
3
Stadium Negara
23 February 1990

Hong Kong
2

		Result
1	U. Vimal Kumar	2 – 0 (15–11, 17–14)	Tse Bun
2	Praveen Kumar	0 – 2 (11–15, 0–15)	Chan Kin Ngai
3	Rajeev Bagga	2 – 1 (17–18, 15–11, 15–7)	Wong Wai Lap
4	Partho Ganguli; Vikram Singh	0 – 2 (9–15, 11–15)	Chan Siu Kwong; Ng Pak Kum
5	Rajeev Bagga; Praveen Kumar	2 – 0 (15–5, 15–7)	Tse Bun; Wong Wai Lap

=== Knockout stage ===
Semi-finals
Malaysia	5
South Korea	0
Thailand	0
Indonesia	5

Final
Malaysia	2
Indonesia	3
Third place
South Korea	3
Thailand	2

==== Semi-finals ====
Malaysia
5
Stadium Negara
24 February 1990

South Korea
0

		Result
1	Foo Kok Keong	2 – 0 (18–15, 15–6)	Kim Hak-kyun
2	Rashid Sidek	2 – 0 (18–13, 15–6)	Lee Gwang-jin
3	Kwan Yoke Meng	2 – 1 (3–15, 18–17, 15–5)	Choi Sang-bum
4	Jalani Sidek; Razif Sidek	2 – 0 (15–0, 15–1)	Park Joo-bong; Shon Jin-hwan
5	Cheah Soon Kit; Rashid Sidek	2 – 0 (15–0, 15–1)	Kim Moon-soo; Sung Han-kook

Indonesia
5
Stadium Negara
24 February 1990

Thailand
0

		Result
1	Eddy Kurniawan	2 – 0 (15–5, 15–6)	Surachai Makkasasithorn
2	Ardy Wiranata	2 – 0 (15–12, 15–2)	Vacharapan Khamthong
3	Joko Suprianto	2 – 0 (15–1, 15–0)	Sawei Chanseorasmee
4	Richard Mainaky; Icuk Sugiarto	2 – 0 (15–7, 15–3)	Komchan Promsarin; Siripong Siripool
5	Gunawan; Eddy Hartono	2 – 0 (15–4, 15–10)	Sawei Chanseorasmee; Pramote Teerawiwatana

==== Third place ====
South Korea
3
Stadium Negara
25 February 1990

Thailand
2

		Result
1	Kim Hak-kyun	1 – 2 (15–8, 3–15, 11–15)	Sompol Kukasemkij
2	Sung Han-kook	2 – 0 (18–16, 15–8)	Karoon Kasayapanan
3	Park Joo-bong	1 – 2 (15–10, 7–15, 1–15)	Vacharapan Khamthong
4	Kim Moon-soo; Shon Jin-hwan	2 – 0 (15–5, 15–9)	Komchan Promsarin; Siripong Siripool
5	Park Joo-bong; Sung Han-kook	2 – 0 (15–4, 15–5)	Sawei Chanseorasmee; Pramote Teerawiwatana

==== Final ====
Malaysia
2
Stadium Negara
25 February 1990

Indonesia
3

		Result
1	Foo Kok Keong	0 – 2 (8–15, 11–15)	Alan Budikusuma
2	Rashid Sidek	2 – 0 (10–15, 17–14, 15–5)	Eddy Kurniawan
3	Wong Tat Meng	0 – 2 (6–15, 1–15)	Joko Suprianto
4	Jalani Sidek; Razif Sidek	2 – 0 (18–15, 15–11)	Gunawan; Eddy Hartono
5	Cheah Soon Kit; Soo Beng Kiang	2 – 1 (15–11, 9–15, 17–14)	Richard Mainaky; Icuk Sugiarto

== European Zone ==
The European qualifying rounds were held in the St. Martiner Street Sports Hall in Villach, Austria. A record-breaking entry of 28 teams took part in the qualifiers.

=== First round ===
==== Group A ====
Pos	Team	Pld	W	L	MF	MA	MD	Pts	Qualification
1	Iceland	3	3	0	14	1	+13	3	Advance to second round
2	Belgium	3	2	1	8	7	+1	2	
3	France	3	1	2	5	10	−5	1	
4	North Korea	3	0	3	3	12	−9	0	

Source: New Straits Times

Iceland
4
St. Martiner Street Sports Hall
19 February 1990

Belgium
1

		Result
1	Broddi Kristjánsson	2 – 0	Jan de Mulder
2	Þorsteinn Páll Hængsson	2 – 0	Pedro Vanneste
3	Guðmundur Adolfsson	1 – 2	Alain de Leeuw
4	Þorsteinn Páll Hængsson; Broddi Kristjánsson	2 – 1	Jan de Mulder; Filip Vigneron
5	Árni Þór Hallgrímsson; Ármann Þorvaldsson	2 – 1	Alain de Leeuw; Pedro Vanneste

France
3
St. Martiner Street Sports Hall
19 February 1990

North Korea
2

		Result
1	Franck Panel	2 – 0	Chang Son-nam
2	Etienne Thobois	1 – 2	Ri Nam-chol
3	Stéphane Renault	2 – 0	Ri Yong-hwan
4	Franck Panel; Stéphane Renault	1 – 2	Ri Nam-chol; Ri Yong-hwan
5	Christophe Jeanjean; Etienne Thobois	2 – 1	Chang Son-nam; Pak Song-jun

Iceland
5
St. Martiner Street Sports Hall
20 February 1990

France
0

		Result
1	Broddi Kristjánsson	2 – 0	Franck Panel
2	Þorsteinn Páll Hængsson	2 – 1	Stéphane Renault
3	Guðmundur Adolfsson	2 – 1	Christophe Jeanjean
4	Þorsteinn Páll Hængsson; Broddi Kristjánsson	2 – 1	Franck Panel; Stéphane Renault
5	Árni Þór Hallgrímsson; Ármann Þorvaldsson	2 – 1	Christophe Jeanjean; Etienne Thobois

Belgium
4
St. Martiner Street Sports Hall
20 February 1990

North Korea
1

		Result
1	Jan de Mulder	2 – 0	Chang Son-nam
2	Pedro Vanneste	1 – 2	Ri Nam-chol
3	Alain de Leeuw	2 – 0	Ri Yong-hwan
4	Jan de Mulder; Filip Vigneron	2 – 1	Ri Nam-chol; Ri Yong-hwan
5	Alain de Leeuw; Pedro Vanneste	2 – 1	Chang Son-nam; Pak Song-jun

Iceland
5
St. Martiner Street Sports Hall
21 February 1990

North Korea
0

		Result
1	Broddi Kristjánsson	2 – 0 (15–8, 15–6)	Ri Nam-chol
2	Þorsteinn Páll Hængsson	2 – 0 (15–9, 15–3)	Ri Yong-hwan
3	Guðmundur Adolfsson	2 – 0 (15–7, 15–0)	Pak Song-jun
4	Þorsteinn Páll Hængsson; Broddi Kristjánsson	2 – 0 (15–9, 15–8)	Ri Nam-chol; Ri Yong-hwan
5	Árni Þór Hallgrímsson; Ármann Þorvaldsson	2 – 0 (15–2, 15–6)	Chon Yong-il; Pak Song-jun

Belgium
3
St. Martiner Street Sports Hall
21 February 1990

France
2

		Result
1	Jan de Mulder	2 – 0	Franck Panel
2	Pedro Vanneste	2 – 1	Etienne Thobois
3	Alain de Leeuw	1 – 2	Stéphane Renault
4	Jan de Mulder; Filip Vigneron	2 – 1	Franck Panel; Stéphane Renault
5	Alain de Leeuw; Pedro Vanneste	1 – 2	Christophe Jeanjean; Etienne Thobois

==== Group B ====
Pos	Team	Pld	W	L	MF	MA	MD	Pts	Qualification
1	Ireland	3	3	0	14	1	+13	3	Advance to second round
2	Switzerland	3	2	1	11	4	+7	2	
3	Israel	3	1	2	4	11	−7	1	
4	Guatemala	3	0	3	1	14	−13	0	
5	Iran	0	0	0	0	0	0	0	Withdrew

Source: New Straits Times

Ireland
5
St. Martiner Street Sports Hall
19 February 1990

Israel
0

		Result
1	Liam McKenna	2 – 0	Reuven Moses
2	Jim Colfor	2 – 0	Amir Moses
3	Michael Watt	2 – 0	Yona Dukalski
4	Jim Colfor; Liam McKenna	2 – 0	Amir Moses; Reuven Moses
5	Michael Watt; Peter Ferguson	2 – 0	Yona Dukalski; Geri Reznik

Switzerland
5
St. Martiner Street Sports Hall
19 February 1990

Israel
0

		Result
1	Thomas Althaus	2 – 0	Reuven Moses
2	Christian Nyffenegger	2 – 0	Amir Moses
3	Pascal Kaul	2 – 0	Danny Schneidman
4	Hubert Müller; Christian Nyffenegger	2 – 0	Amir Moses; Reuven Moses
5	Thomas Althaus; Pascal Kaul	2 – 0	Costa Kaminski; Danny Schneidman

Switzerland
5
St. Martiner Street Sports Hall
20 February 1990

Guatemala
0

		Result
1	Thomas Althaus	2 – 0	Raúl Martínez
2	Christian Nyffenegger	2 – 1	Kenneth Erichsen
3	Pascal Kaul	2 – 0	Renato Rosales
4	Hubert Müller; Christian Nyffenegger	2 – 0	Kenneth Erichsen; Renato Rosales
5	Thomas Althaus; Pascal Kaul	2 – 0	José de León; Raúl Martínez

Guatemala
1
St. Martiner Street Sports Hall
20 February 1990

Israel
4

		Result
1	Kenneth Erichsen	2 – 0	Reuven Moses
2	Renato Rosales	1 – 2	Amir Moses
3	José de León	1 – 2	Gadi Moses
4	Kenneth Erichsen; José de León	1 – 2	Amir Moses; Reuven Moses
5	Raúl Martínez; Renato Rosales	1 – 2	Yona Dukalski; Geri Reznik

Ireland
4
St. Martiner Street Sports Hall
21 February 1990

Switzerland
1

		Result
1	Liam McKenna	2 – 1	Thomas Althaus
2	Michael Watt	2 – 1	Hubert Müller
3	Michael O'Meara	1 – 2	Pascal Kaul
4	Peter Ferguson; Michael O'Meara	2 – 1	Laurent Jaquenoud; Jorge Rodríguez
5	Liam McKenna; Michael Watt	2 – 1	Hubert Müller; Christian Nyffenegger

Ireland
5
St. Martiner Street Sports Hall
21 February 1990

Guatemala
0

		Result
1	Liam McKenna	2 – 0	Raúl Martínez
2	Michael Watt	2 – 1	Kenneth Erichsen
3	Michael O'Meara	2 – 1	Renato Rosales
4	Peter Ferguson; Michael O'Meara	2 – 0	Kenneth Erichsen; Renato Rosales
5	Liam McKenna; Michael Watt	2 – 0	José de León; Raúl Martínez

==== Group C ====
Pos	Team	Pld	W	L	MF	MA	MD	Pts	Qualification
1	Wales	3	3	0	14	1	+13	3	Advance to second round
2	Bulgaria	3	2	1	10	5	+5	2	
3	Spain (Note: Spain were moved up from Group D to Group C following the withdrawals of Nigeria and Peru.)	3	1	2	6	9	−3	1	
4	Kenya	3	0	3	0	15	−15	0	
5	Nigeria	0	0	0	0	0	0	0	Withdrew
6	Peru	0	0	0	0	0	0	0	Withdrew

Source: New Straits Times
Notes:

Wales
5
St. Martiner Street Sports Hall
19 February 1990

Kenya
0

		Result
1	Steven Yates	2 – 0	Satish Narasimhan
2	Mark Richards	2 – 0	Arun Balaraman
3	Andrew Spencer	2 – 0	Simon Kihara
4	Mark Richards; Andrew Spencer	2 – 0	Arun Balaraman; Satish Narasimhan
5	Richard Burton; Andrew Carlotti	2 – 0	Simon Kihara; Vijai Maini

Spain
1
St. Martiner Street Sports Hall
19 February 1990

Bulgaria
4

		Result
1	David Serrano	2 – 1	Stojan Ivantchev
2	Ángel Fernández	1 – 2	Stanimir Boitchinov
3	Antonio Miranda	1 – 2	Jeliazko Valkov
4	Ángel Fernández; José María Otero	0 – 2	Dinko Dukov; Jeliazko Valkov
5	Antonio Miranda; David Serrano	1 – 2	Stanimir Boitchinov; Stojan Ivantchev

Spain
5
St. Martiner Street Sports Hall
20 February 1990

Kenya
0

		Result
1	David Serrano	2 – 0	Satish Narasimhan
2	Ángel Fernández	2 – 0	Arun Balaraman
3	Antonio Miranda	2 – 0	Simon Kihara
4	Ángel Fernández; José María Otero	2 – 0	Arun Balaraman; Satish Narasimhan
5	Antonio Miranda; David Serrano	2 – 0	Simon Kihara; Vijai Maini

Wales
4
St. Martiner Street Sports Hall
20 February 1990

Bulgaria
1

		Result
1	Steven Yates	2 – 0	Stojan Ivantchev
2	Mark Richards	2 – 0	Jeliazko Valkov
3	Philip Sutton	2 – 0	Boris Lalov
4	Mark Richards; Andrew Spencer	1 – 2	Dinko Dukov; Jeliazko Valkov
5	Richard Burton; Andrew Carlotti	2 – 0	Stojan Ivantchev; Boris Lalov

Wales
5
St. Martiner Street Sports Hall
21 February 1990

Spain
0

		Result
1	Steven Yates	2 – 0	David Serrano
2	Mark Richards	2 – 1	Ángel Fernández
3	Andrew Spencer	2 – 1	Antonio Miranda
4	Mark Richards; Andrew Spencer	2 – 1	Ángel Fernández; José María Otero
5	Richard Burton; Andrew Carlotti	2 – 0	Antonio Miranda; David Serrano

Bulgaria
5
St. Martiner Street Sports Hall
21 February 1990

Kenya
0

		Result
1	Stojan Ivantchev	2 – 0	Satish Narasimhan
2	Stanimir Boitchinov	2 – 0	Arun Balaraman
3	Jeliazko Valkov	2 – 0	Simon Kihara
4	Dinko Dukov; Jeliazko Valkov	2 – 0	Arun Balaraman; Satish Narasimhan
5	Stojan Ivantchev; Boris Lalov	2 – 0	Simon Kihara; Vijai Maini

==== Group D ====
Pos	Team	Pld	W	L	MF	MA	MD	Pts	Qualification
1	Norway	3	3	0	15	0	+15	3	Advance to second round
2	Czechoslovakia	3	2	1	9	6	+3	2	
3	Hungary	3	1	2	6	9	−3	1	
4	Italy	3	0	3	0	15	−15	0	

Source: New Straits Times

Hungary
5
St. Martiner Street Sports Hall
19 February 1990

Italy
0

		Result
1	Attila Nagy	2 – 0	Anton Klotzner
2	Gábor Petrovits	2 – 0	Stefan Kantioler
3	Csaba Béleczki	2 – 0	Kurt Salutt
4	Attila Nagy; Gábor Petrovits	2 – 0	Karl Freund; Anton Klotzner
5	Csaba Béleczki; Sandor Klein	2 – 0	Giorgio Bianchi; Kurt Salutt

Czechoslovakia
5
St. Martiner Street Sports Hall
19 February 1990

Italy
0

		Result
1	Tomasz Mendrek	2 – 1	Anton Klotzner
2	Petr Báša	2 – 0	Stefan Kantioler
3	Radek Svoboda	2 – 0	Giorgio Bianchi
4	Petr Báša; Zdeněk Musil	2 – 0	Giorgio Bianchi; Kurt Salutt
5	Jiří Dufek; Tomasz Mendrek	2 – 0	Stefan Kantioler; Anton Klotzner

Norway
5
St. Martiner Street Sports Hall
20 February 1990

Czechoslovakia
0

		Result
1	Hans Sperre Jr.	2 – 0 (15–9, 15–0)	Tomasz Mendrek
2	Erik Lia	2 – 0 (15–7, 18–14)	Petr Báša
3	Øyvind Berntsen	2 – 0 (15–7, 15–9)	Radek Svoboda
4	Erik Lia; Hans Sperre Jr.	2 – 0 (15–10, 15–9)	Petr Báša; Zdeněk Musil
5	Thore Næss; Trond Wåland	2 – 0 (15–6, 15–7)	Jiří Dufek; Tomasz Mendrek

Norway
5
St. Martiner Street Sports Hall
20 February 1990

Italy
0

		Result
1	Hans Sperre Jr.	2 – 0 (15–0, 15–3)	Anton Klotzner
2	Erik Lia	2 – 0 (15–2, 15–6)	Stefan Kantioler
3	Øystein Larsen	2 – 0 (15–3, 15–2)	Giorgio Bianchi
4	Øyvind Berntsen; Tor Egil Kristensen	2 – 0 (15–7, 15–3)	Stefan Kantioler; Anton Klotzner
5	Thore Næss; Trond Wåland	2 – 0 (15–2, 15–0)	Roland Osele; Andreas Pichler

Czechoslovakia
4
St. Martiner Street Sports Hall
21 February 1990

Hungary
1

		Result
1	Tomasz Mendrek	1 – 2	Attila Nagy
2	Petr Báša	2 – 1	Gábor Petrovits
3	Radek Svoboda	2 – 1	Zsolt Kocsis
4	Petr Báša; Zdeněk Musil	2 – 1	Attila Nagy; Gábor Petrovits
5	Jiří Dufek; Tomasz Mendrek	2 – 0	Csaba Béleczki; Zsolt Kocsis

Norway
5
St. Martiner Street Sports Hall
21 February 1990

Hungary
0

		Result
1	Hans Sperre Jr.	2 – 1 (15–9, 10–15, 15–3)	Attila Nagy
2	Erik Lia	2 – 0 (15–10, 15–13)	Gábor Petrovits
3	Øyvind Berntsen	2 – 0 (15–4, 15–1)	Zsolt Kocsis
4	Erik Lia; Hans Sperre Jr.	2 – 0 (15–1, 15–6)	Attila Nagy; Gábor Petrovits
5	Øyvind Berntsen; Tor Egil Kristensen	2 – 0 (15–2, 15–0)	Csaba Béleczki; Zsolt Kocsis

=== Second round ===
==== Group W ====
Pos	Team	Pld	W	L	MF	MA	MD	Pts	Qualification
1	Denmark	3	3	0	15	0	+15	3	Advance to knockout stage
2	Soviet Union	3	2	1	9	6	+3	2	
3	Finland	3	1	2	6	9	−3	1	
4	Iceland	3	0	3	0	15	−15	0	

Source: New Straits Times

Denmark
5
St. Martiner Street Sports Hall
22 February 1990

Iceland
0

		Result
1	Morten Frost	2 – 0 (15–7, 15–6)	Broddi Kristjánsson
2	Poul-Erik Høyer Larsen	2 – 0 (15–12, 15–6)	Þorsteinn Páll Hængsson
3	Jens Peter Nierhoff	2 – 1 (15–5, 16–18, 15–3)	Guðmundur Adolfsson
4	Mark Christiansen; Michael Kjeldsen	2 – 0 (15–13, 15–10)	Þorsteinn Páll Hængsson; Broddi Kristjánsson
5	Max Gandrup; Thomas Lund	2 – 0 (15–4, 15–4)	Árni Þór Hallgrímsson; Ármann Þorvaldsson

Finland
1
St. Martiner Street Sports Hall
22 February 1990

Soviet Union
4

		Result
1	Jyri Aalto	0 – 2 (5–15, 4–15)	Andrey Antropov
2	Lasse Lindelöf	0 – 2 (9–15, 12–15)	Igor Dmitriev
3	Tony Tuominen	2 – 0 (15–10, 15–10)	Vitaliy Shmakov
4	Jyri Aalto; Lasse Lindelöf	0 – 2 (6–15, 3–15)	Andrey Antropov; Igor Dmitriev
5	Mika Heinonen; Robert Liljequist	0 – 2 (4–15, 12–15)	Vitaliy Shmakov; Nikolai Zuyev

Iceland
0
St. Martiner Street Sports Hall
22 February 1990

Soviet Union
5

		Result
1	Broddi Kristjánsson	0 – 2 (4–15, 4–15)	Andrey Antropov
2	Þorsteinn Páll Hængsson	0 – 2 (8–15, 8–15)	Igor Dmitriev
3	Guðmundur Adolfsson	0 – 2 (3–15, 7–15)	Vitaliy Shmakov
4	Þorsteinn Páll Hængsson; Broddi Kristjánsson	0 – 2 (4–15, 8–15)	Andrey Antropov; Igor Dmitriev
5	Árni Þór Hallgrímsson; Ármann Þorvaldsson	1 – 2 (15–12, 16–18, 2–15)	Vitaliy Shmakov; Nikolai Zuyev

Denmark
5
St. Martiner Street Sports Hall
22 February 1990

Finland
0

		Result
1	Poul-Erik Høyer Larsen	2 – 0	Jyri Aalto
2	Jens Peter Nierhoff	2 – 0	Lasse Lindelöf
3	Jon Holst-Christensen	2 – 1	Tony Tuominen
4	Mark Christiansen; Michael Kjeldsen	2 – 0	Jyri Aalto; Lasse Lindelöf
5	Max Gandrup; Thomas Lund	2 – 0	Mika Heinonen; Robert Liljequist

Denmark
5
St. Martiner Street Sports Hall
23 February 1990

Soviet Union
0

		Result
1	Morten Frost	2 – 0 (15–7, 15–5)	Andrey Antropov
2	Poul-Erik Høyer Larsen	2 – 0 (15–1, 15–0)	Igor Dmitriev
3	Nils Skeby	2 – 1 (12–15, 15–3, 15–5)	Vitaliy Shmakov
4	Mark Christiansen; Michael Kjeldsen	2 – 0 (15–3, 15–6)	Andrey Antropov; Igor Dmitriev
5	Max Gandrup; Thomas Lund	2 – 0 (15–8, 15–5)	Vitaliy Shmakov; Nikolai Zuyev

Iceland
0
St. Martiner Street Sports Hall
23 February 1990

Finland
5

		Result
1	Broddi Kristjánsson	0 – 2 (9–15, 2–15)	Jyri Aalto
2	Þorsteinn Páll Hængsson	1 – 2 (15–13, 10–15, 0–15)	Lasse Lindelöf
3	Guðmundur Adolfsson	0 – 2 (1–15, 1–15)	Tony Tuominen
4	Þorsteinn Páll Hængsson; Broddi Kristjánsson	1 – 2 (15–10, 15–18, 12–15)	Robert Liljequist; Lasse Lindelöf
5	Árni Þór Hallgrímsson; Ármann Þorvaldsson	0 – 2 (3–15, 9–15)	Mika Heinonen; Tony Tuominen

==== Group X ====
Pos	Team	Pld	W	L	MF	MA	MD	Pts	Qualification
1	Netherlands	3	3	0	15	0	+15	3	Advance to knockout stage
2	Scotland	3	2	1	9	6	+3	2	
3	Ireland	3	1	2	6	9	−3	1	
4	Poland	3	0	3	1	14	−13	0	

Source: New Straits Times

Netherlands
5
St. Martiner Street Sports Hall
22 February 1990

Ireland
0

		Result
1	Pierre Pelupessy	2 – 0 (15–4, 15–2)	Liam McKenna
2	Chris Bruil	2 – 0 (15–2, 15–4)	Jim Colfor
3	Edwin van Dalm	2 – 1 (18–14, 10–15, 15–5)	Michael Watt
4	Alex Meijer; Pierre Pelupessy	2 – 1 (7–15, 15–6, 15–12)	Peter Ferguson; Michael O'Meara
5	Ron Michels; Uun Santosa	2 – 0 (15–2, 15–0)	Liam McKenna; Michael Watt

Scotland
5
St. Martiner Street Sports Hall
22 February 1990

Poland
0

		Result
1	David Gilmour	2 – 1	Jacek Hankiewicz
2	Kevin Scott	2 – 0	Zbigniew Suruda
3	Alex White	2 – 0	Roman Golinowski
4	Kenny Middlemiss; Dan Travers	2 – 1	Jerzy Dołhan; Jacek Hankiewicz
5	Alan McMillan; Alex White	2 – 0	Roman Golinowski; Zbigniew Suruda

Netherlands
5
St. Martiner Street Sports Hall
22 February 1990

Poland
0

		Result
1	Pierre Pelupessy	2 – 0 (15–2, 15–6)	Jacek Hankiewicz
2	Chris Bruil	2 – 0 (15–1, 15–5)	Zbigniew Suruda
3	Edwin van Dalm	2 – 0 (15–6, 15–7)	Roman Golinowski
4	Alex Meijer; Pierre Pelupessy	2 – 0 (15–6, 15–7)	Jerzy Dołhan; Jacek Hankiewicz
5	Ron Michels; Uun Santosa	2 – 0 (15–5, 15–1)	Roman Golinowski; Zbigniew Suruda

Scotland
5
St. Martiner Street Sports Hall
22 February 1990

Ireland
0

		Result
1	David Gilmour	2 – 0	Liam McKenna
2	Kevin Scott	2 – 0	Jim Colfor
3	Alex White	2 – 0	Michael Watt
4	Kenny Middlemiss; Dan Travers	1 – 2	Peter Ferguson; Michael O'Meara
5	Alan McMillan; Alex White	2 – 0	Liam McKenna; Michael Watt

Netherlands
5
St. Martiner Street Sports Hall
23 February 1990

Scotland
0

		Result
1	Pierre Pelupessy	2 – 0 (15–2, 15–3)	David Gilmour
2	Chris Bruil	2 – 0 (15–10, 15–5)	Kevin Scott
3	Edwin van Dalm	2 – 1 (4–15, 15–11, 18–17)	Alex White
4	Alex Meijer; Pierre Pelupessy	2 – 0 (15–11, 15–12)	Kenny Middlemiss; Dan Travers
5	Alan McMillan; Alex White	2 – 0 (15–6, 15–11)	Liam McKenna; Michael Watt

Ireland
4
St. Martiner Street Sports Hall
23 February 1990

Poland
1

		Result
1	Liam McKenna	2 – 1	Jacek Hankiewicz
2	Jim Colfor	2 – 0	Zbigniew Suruda
3	Michael Watt	2 – 0	Roman Golinowski
4	Peter Ferguson; Michael O'Meara	2 – 1	Jerzy Dołhan; Jacek Hankiewicz
5	Liam McKenna; Michael Watt	1 – 2	Roman Golinowski; Zbigniew Suruda

==== Group Y ====
Pos	Team	Pld	W	L	MF	MA	MD	Pts	Qualification
1	England	3	3	0	15	0	+15	3	Advance to knockout stage
2	United States	3	2	1	7	8	−1	2	
3	Norway	3	1	2	4	11	−7	1	
4	West Germany	3	0	3	4	11	−7	0	

Source: New Straits Times

England
5
St. Martiner Street Sports Hall
22 February 1990

Norway
0

		Result
1	Steve Baddeley	2 – 0 (15–5, 15–3)	Trond Wåland
2	Darren Hall	2 – 0 (15–7, 15–7)	Øystein Larsen
3	Steve Butler	2 – 0 (15–1, 15–5)	Thore Næss
4	Andrew Fairhurst; Chris Hunt	2 – 0 (15–3, 15–10)	Erik Lia; Hans Sperre Jr.
5	Nick Ponting; Dave Wright	2 – 0 (15–2, 15–5)	Øyvind Berntsen; Tor Egil Kristensen

United States
3
St. Martiner Street Sports Hall
22 February 1990

West Germany
2

		Result
1	Chris Jogis	2 – 0 (15–9, 15–5)	Volker Renzelmann
2	Benny Lee	2 – 1 (3–15, 15–7, 15–11)	Markus Keck
3	Tariq Wadood	2 – 1 (15–9, 11–15, 15–12)	Robert Neumann
4	Chris Jogis; Benny Lee	1 – 2 (15–9, 9–15, 16–17)	Stefan Frey; Robert Neumann
5	John Britton; Tariq Wadood	0 – 2 (6–15, 2–15)	Markus Keck; Stephan Kuhl

Norway
3
St. Martiner Street Sports Hall
22 February 1990

West Germany
2

		Result
1	Hans Sperre Jr.	2 – 0 (15–9, 15–9)	Volker Renzelmann
2	Erik Lia	2 – 1 (11–15, 15–11, 15–7)	Markus Keck
3	Øyvind Berntsen	2 – 0 (15–4, 15–4)	Michael Helber
4	Erik Lia; Hans Sperre Jr.	0 – 2 (11–15, 2–15)	Stefan Frey; Robert Neumann
5	Øyvind Berntsen; Tor Egil Kristensen	0 – 2 (5–15, 10–15)	Markus Keck; Stephan Kuhl

England
5
St. Martiner Street Sports Hall
22 February 1990

United States
0

		Result
1	Darren Hall	2 – 1 (11–15, 18–15, 15–2)	Chris Jogis
2	Anders Nielsen	2 – 0 (15–5, 15–3)	Tony Alston
3	Steve Butler	2 – 0 (15–5, 15–4)	Ashok Raman
4	Nick Ponting; Dave Wright	2 – 0 (15–7, 15–1)	John Britton; Thomas Reidy
5	Steve Baddeley; Chris Hunt	2 – 0 (18–17, 18–15)	Tariq Wadood; Benny Lee

England
5
St. Martiner Street Sports Hall
23 February 1990

West Germany
0

		Result
1	Darren Hall	2 – 0 (15–12, 15–4)	Volker Renzelmann
2	Anders Nielsen	2 – 0 (15–9, 15–6)	Stephan Kuhl
3	Steve Butler	2 – 0 (15–12, 15–3)	Michael Helber
4	Nick Ponting; Dave Wright	2 – 0 (15–5, 15–7)	Stefan Frey; Robert Neumann
5	Steve Baddeley; Anders Nielsen	2 – 1 (11–15, 15–7, 18–16)	Markus Keck; Stephan Kuhl

United States
4
St. Martiner Street Sports Hall
23 February 1990

Norway
1

		Result
1	Chris Jogis	2 – 1 (10–15, 15–3, 15–5)	Hans Sperre Jr.
2	Benny Lee	2 – 1 (15–6, 13–18, 15–4)	Erik Lia
3	Tariq Wadood	2 – 1 (6–15, 15–7, 15–9)	Øyvind Berntsen
4	Chris Jogis; Benny Lee	1 – 2 (15–11, 17–18, 11–15)	Erik Lia; Hans Sperre Jr.
5	John Britton; Tariq Wadood	2 – 1 (1–15, 15–8, 18–17)	Thore Næss; Trond Wåland

==== Group Z ====
Pos	Team	Pld	W	L	MF	MA	MD	Pts	Qualification
1	Sweden	3	3	0	14	1	+13	3	Advance to knockout stage
2	Canada	3	2	1	11	4	+7	2	
3	Austria	3	1	2	3	12	−9	1	
4	Wales	3	0	3	2	13	−11	0	

Source: New Straits Times

Sweden
5
St. Martiner Street Sports Hall
22 February 1990

Wales
0

		Result
1	Jens Olsson	2 – 0 (15–7, 15–6)	Steven Yates
2	Jonas Herrgårdh	2 – 0 (15–5, 15–3)	Mark Richards
3	Jörgen Tuvesson	2 – 0 (15–6, 15–4)	Philip Sutton
4	Jan-Eric Antonsson; Pär-Gunnar Jönsson	2 – 0 (15–1, 15–5)	Mark Richards; Andrew Spencer
5	Peter Axelsson; Mikael Rosén	2 – 0 (15–4, 15–3)	Richard Burton; Andrew Carlotti

Canada
5
St. Martiner Street Sports Hall
22 February 1990

Austria
0

		Result
1	Mike Butler	2 – 0	Heinz Fischer
2	Bryan Blanshard	2 – 0	Peter Moritz
3	John Goss	2 – 1	Jürgen Koch
4	Mike Bitten; Bryan Blanshard	2 – 1	Heimo Götschl; Harald Koch
5	David Humble; Anil Kaul	2 – 1	Hannes Fuchs; Jürgen Koch

Sweden
5
St. Martiner Street Sports Hall
22 February 1990

Austria
0

		Result
1	Jens Olsson	2 – 0 (15–9, 15–4)	Heinz Fischer
2	Peter Axelsson	2 – 0 (15–8, 15–6)	Peter Moritz
3	Jonas Herrgårdh	2 – 0 (18–16, 15–1)	Jürgen Koch
4	Jan-Eric Antonsson; Pär-Gunnar Jönsson	2 – 0 (15–4, 18–14)	Heimo Götschl; Harald Koch
5	Peter Axelsson; Mikael Rosén	2 – 0 (15–1, 15–2)	Tariq Farooq; Hannes Fuchs

Canada
5
St. Martiner Street Sports Hall
22 February 1990

Wales
0

		Result
1	David Humble	2 – 0	Steven Yates
2	Bryan Blanshard	2 – 0	Mark Richards
3	John Goss	2 – 1	Philip Sutton
4	Mike Bitten; Bryan Blanshard	2 – 0	Mark Richards; Andrew Spencer
5	David Humble; Anil Kaul	2 – 0	Richard Burton; Andrew Carlotti

Sweden
4
St. Martiner Street Sports Hall
23 February 1990

Canada
1

		Result
1	Jens Olsson	2 – 0 (15–4, 15–5)	David Humble
2	Pär-Gunnar Jönsson	2 – 1 (15–7, 4–15, 15–3)	Bryan Blanshard
3	Jonas Herrgårdh	2 – 0 (15–6, 15–5)	John Goss
4	Jan-Eric Antonsson; Pär-Gunnar Jönsson	1 – 2 (13–15, 15–9, 10–15)	Mike Bitten; Bryan Blanshard
5	Peter Axelsson; Mikael Rosén	2 – 1 (18–15, 14–18, 15–12)	David Humble; Anil Kaul

Wales
2
St. Martiner Street Sports Hall
23 February 1990

Austria
3

		Result
1	Steven Yates	2 – 1	Heinz Fischer
2	Mark Richards	1 – 2	Peter Moritz
3	Philip Sutton	1 – 2	Jürgen Koch
4	Mark Richards; Andrew Spencer	0 – 2	Heimo Götschl; Harald Koch
5	Richard Burton; Andrew Carlotti	2 – 1	Tariq Farooq; Hannes Fuchs

=== Knockout stage ===
Semi-finals
Denmark	4
Netherlands	1
England	2
Sweden	3

Final
Denmark	4
Sweden	1
Third place
Netherlands	1
England	4

==== Semi-finals ====
Denmark
4
St. Martiner Street Sports Hall
24 February 1990

Netherlands
1

		Result
1	Morten Frost	2 – 0 (15–11, 15–2)	Pierre Pelupessy
2	Poul-Erik Høyer Larsen	2 – 0 (15–5, 15–6)	Lex Coene
3	Jens Peter Nierhoff	1 – 0 (15^{r}–11)	Chris Bruil
4	Mark Christiansen; Michael Kjeldsen	2 – 0 (15–11, 15–6)	Ron Michels; Edwin van Dalm
5	Max Gandrup; Thomas Lund	2 – 0 (15–4, 15–8)	Alex Meijer; Uun Santosa

England
2
St. Martiner Street Sports Hall
24 February 1990

Sweden
3

		Result
1	Darren Hall	2 – 0 (17–16, 11–15, 15–12)	Peter Axelsson
2	Anders Nielsen	1 – 2 (17–15, 12–15, 10–15)	Jonas Herrgårdh
3	Steve Butler	2 – 0 (15–4, 15–1)	Jörgen Tuvesson
4	Andrew Fairhurst; Chris Hunt	0 – 2 (5–15, 4–15)	Jan-Eric Antonsson; Pär-Gunnar Jönsson
5	Nick Ponting; Dave Wright	0 – 2 (4–15, 9–15)	Peter Axelsson; Mikael Rosén

==== Third place ====
England
4
St. Martiner Street Sports Hall
25 February 1990

Netherlands
1

		Result
1	Steve Baddeley	2 – 0 (15–12, 15–10)	Pierre Pelupessy
2	Darren Hall	2 – 1 (8–15, 15–7, 15–6)	Lex Coene
3	Steve Butler	2 – 0 (15–7, 15–2)	Chris Bruil
4	Andrew Fairhurst; Chris Hunt	0 – 2 (8–15, 10–15)	Alex Meijer; Pierre Pelupessy
5	Nick Ponting; Dave Wright	2 – 0 (15–6, 15–5)	Ron Michels; Uun Santosa

==== Final ====
Denmark
4
St. Martiner Street Sports Hall
25 February 1990

Sweden
1

		Result
1	Morten Frost	2 – 0 (15–5, 15–8)	Peter Axelsson
2	Poul-Erik Høyer Larsen	2 – 1 (8–15, 15–9, 15–9)	Jonas Herrgårdh
3	Jon Holst-Christensen	0 – 2 (13–15, 9–15)	Jörgen Tuvesson
4	Mark Christiansen; Michael Kjeldsen	2 – 0 (18–15, 15–10)	Jan-Eric Antonsson; Pär-Gunnar Jönsson
5	Max Gandrup; Thomas Lund	2 – 1 (7–15, 18–16, 15–8)	Peter Axelsson; Mikael Rosén
