= 2007 in badminton =

== BWF events ==
- Sudirman Cup (Details) (Glasgow, Scotland, June 10—June 17)
  - Final: China beat Indonesia, 3–0
    - Mixed doubles: Zheng Bo & Gao Ling beat Flandy Limpele & Vita Marissa, 19–21, 21–17, 21–19
    - Men's doubles: Fu Haifeng & Cai Yun beat Markis Kido & Candra Wijaya, 21–11, 21–13
    - Woman's singles: Zhang Ning beat Adriyanti Firdasari, 21–16, 21–9
  - Match cancelled after the tie winner already decided:
    - Women's doubles: Yang Wei & Zhao Tingting vs Greysia Polii & Vita Marissa
    - Men's singles: Lin Dan vs Taufik Hidayat
- World Championships (Details) (Kuala Lumpur, Malaysia, August 7—August 19)
  - Men's singles: Lin Dan (CHN) beat Sony Dwi Kuncoro (INA) 21–11, 22–20
  - Men's doubles: Markis Kido & Hendra Setiawan (INA) beat Jung Jae-sung & Lee Yong-dae (KOR) 21–19, 21–19
  - Women's singles: Zhu Lin (CHN) beat Wang Chen (HKG) 21–8, 21–12
  - Women's doubles: Yang Wei & Zhang Jiewen (CHN) beat Gao Ling & Huang Sui (CHN) 21–16, 21–19
  - Mixed doubles: Nova Widianto & Lilyana Natsir (INA) beat Zheng Bo & Gao Ling (CHN) 21–16, 21–14
- World Junior Championships (Details) (Auckland, New Zealand, October 25—November 4)
  - Team final: China beat South Korea, 3–1
    - Mixed doubles: Chai Biao & Li Xuerui lost to Shin Baek-cheol & Yoo Hyun-young, 18–21, 15–21
    - Men's singles: Chen Long beat Park Sung-min, 21–15, 21–14
    - Women's singles: Wang Lin beat Sung Ji-hyun, 21–12, 21–6
    - Men's doubles: Chai Biao & Li Tian beat Shin Baek-cheol & Chung Eui-seok, 18–21, 21–17, 21–13
    - Women's doubles: Wang Xiaoli & Li Xuerui vs Yoo Hyun-young & Jung Kyung-eun (canceled after tie decided)
  - Individual:
    - Men's singles: Chen Long (CHN) beat Kenichi Tago (JPN) 21–16, 21–14
    - Men's doubles: Chung Eui-seok & Shin Baek-cheol (KOR) beat Li Tian & Chai Biao (CHN) 24–26, 21–19, 21–15
    - Women's singles: Wang Lin (CHN) beat Bae Youn-joo (KOR) 21–16, 21–15
    - Women's doubles: Xie Jing & Zhong Qianxin (CHN) beat Yoo Hyun-young & Jung Kyung-eun (KOR) 21–18, 10–21, 21–15
    - Mixed doubles: Lim Khim Wah & Ng Hui Lin (MAS) beat Chris Adcock & Gabrielle White (ENG) 23–25, 22–20, 21–19

== International events ==
- European B Team Championships 2007 (Reykjavík, Iceland, January 17—January 21)
  - Final: Iceland beat Ireland 3–2
    - Mixed doubles: Tinna Helgadóttir & Helgi Jóhannesson lost to Karen Bing & Donal O'Halloran, 21–12, 13–21, 4–21
    - Women's singles: Ragna Ingólfsdóttir beat Chloe Magee, 21–18, 21–18
    - Men's singles: Njörður Ludvigsson lost to Scott Evans, 11–21, 15–21
    - Men's doubles: Helgi Jóhannesson & Magnús Ingi Helgason beat Donal O'Halloran & Mark Topping, 8–21, 23–21, 21–18
    - Women's doubles: Ragna Ingólfsdóttir & Tinna Helgadóttir beat Chloe Magee & Karen Bing, 21–16, 21–16
- Europe Cup 2007 (Amersfoort, Netherlands, June 27—July 1)
  - Final: New League Primorye beat BC Amersfoort 4–2
    - Mixed doubles: Evgenij Dremin & Valeria Sorokina beat Eric Pang & Lotte Bruil-Jonathans, 21–12, 22–20
    - Women's singles (1): Evgenia Dimova lost to Yao Jie, 7–21, 11–21
    - Women's singles (2): Nina Vislova beat Larisa Griga (UKR), 21–17, 21–12
    - Men's singles (1): Stanislav Pukhov beat Dicky Palyama, 21–13, 21–18
    - Men's singles (2): Sergey Lunev lost to Eric Pang, 14–21, 14–21
    - Women's doubles: Nina Vislova & Valeria Sorokina beat Yao Jie & Lotte Bruil-Jonathans, 21–16, 21–10
  - Match cancelled after tie already decided:
    - Men's doubles: Alexey Vasiliev & Evgenij Dremin vs Dicky Palyama & Joéli Residay

New League Primorye: Representatives from Dutch players (unless notable)
BC Amersfoort: Representatives from Russian players

- Pan American Games (Rio de Janeiro, Brazil, July 14—July 19)
  - Men's singles: Mike Beres (CAN) beat Kevin Cordón (GUA) 13–21, 21–11, 21–10
  - Men's doubles: William Milroy & Mike Beres (CAN) beat Bob Malaythong & Howard Bach (USA) 22–20, 21–13
  - Women's singles: Eva Lee (USA) beat Charmaine Reid (CAN) 21–14, 21–18
  - Women's doubles: Eva Lee & Mesinee Mangkalakiri (USA) beat Charmaine Reid & Fiona Mckee (CAN) 21–14, 21–15
  - Mixed doubles: Eva Lee & Howard Bach (USA) beat Val Loker & Mike Beres (CAN) 21–19, 21–16
- Head Lausanne YI 2007 (Lausanne, September 28—September 30)
  - Under 17:
    - Men's singles: Rafael Galvez (ESP) beat Raphaël Van Wel (BEL) 21–16, 21–19
    - Women's singles: Sofie Descheemaecker (BEL) beat Carolina Marín (ESP) 21–12, 21–12
    - Men's doubles: Mattijs Dierickx & Freek Golinski (BEL) beat Anurag Barmecha & Kris Dendoncker (BEL) 21–14, 21–19
    - Women's doubles: Ewa Piotrowska & Edyta Tarasewicz (POL) beat Carolina Marín & Ana Maria Martin (ESP) walkover
    - Mixed doubles: Belinda Heber & Paul Demmelmayer (AUT) beat Leire Querejeta & Diego Errandonea (ESP) 21–19, 21–17
  - Under 19:
    - Men's singles: Luka Wraber (AUT) beat Petr Jelinek (CZE) 14–21, 21–17, 21–11
    - Women's singles: Lianne Tan (BEL) beat Adela Molnariova (CZE) 21–19, 19–21, 21–16
    - Men's doubles: Matez Bajuk & Aljosa Turk (SLO) beat David Obernosterer & Jan Sedimayr (AUT) 21–16, 21–16
    - Women's doubles: Steffi Daemen & Debbie Janssens (BEL) beat Janne Elst & Jelske Snoeck (BEL) 21–15, 21–17
    - Mixed doubles: Debbie Janssens & Damien Maquet (BEL) beat Cendrine Hantz & Livio Dorizzi (SUI) 21–17, 21–19
- Copenhagen Masters 2007 (Falconer Centret, Copenhagen, December 27—December 29)
  - Men's singles: Peter Gade (DEN) beat Kenneth Jonassen (DEN) 21–18, 23–21
  - Women's singles: Xu Huaiwen (FRA) beat Zhou Mi (HKG) 21–11, 19–21, 15–9 (retirement)
  - Men's doubles: Jens Eriksen & Martin Lundgaard Hansen (DEN) beat Mohd Zakry Abdul Latif & Mohd Fairuzizuan Mohd Tazari (MAS) 21–11, 21–17

== BWF Super Series ==
- Malaysia Open (Kuala Lumpur, January 16—January 21)
  - Men's singles: Peter Gade (DEN) beat Bao Chunlai (CHN) 21–15, 17–21, 21–14
  - Men's doubles: Koo Kien Keat & Tan Boon Heong (MAS) beat Candra Wijaya (INA) & Tony Gunawan (USA) 21–15, 21–18
  - Women's singles: Zhu Lin (CHN) beat Wong Mew Choo (MAS) 21–15, 21–12
  - Women's doubles: Gao Ling & Huang Sui (CHN) beat Greysia Polii & Vita Marissa (INA) 19–21, 21–12, 21–11
  - Mixed doubles: Zheng Bo & Gao Ling (CHN) beat Nathan Robertson & Gail Emms (ENG) 21–12, 14–21, 21–15
- Korea Open (Seoul, January 23—January 28)
  - Men's singles: Lin Dan (CHN) beat Chen Jin (CHN) 21–14, 21–19
  - Men's doubles: Jung Jae-sung & Lee Yong-dae (KOR) beat Lee Jae-jin & Hwang Ji-man (KOR) 21–16, 21–15
  - Women's singles: Xie Xingfang (CHN) beat Zhu Lin (CHN) 21–14, 21–7
  - Women's doubles: Gao Ling & Huang Sui (CHN) beat Yang Wei & Zhang Jiewen (CHN) 12–21, 21–14, 21–16
  - Mixed doubles: Zheng Bo & Gao Ling (CHN) beat Thomas Laybourn & Kamilla Rytter Juhl (DEN) 22–20, 21–19
- All England Open (Birmingham, March 6—March 11)
  - Men's singles: Lin Dan (CHN) beat Chen Yu (CHN) 21–13, 21–12
  - Men's doubles: Koo Kien Keat & Tan Boon Heong (MAS) beat Cai Yun & Fu Haifeng (CHN) 21–15, 21–18
  - Women's singles: Xie Xingfang (CHN) beat Pi Hongyan (FRA) 21–6, 21–13
  - Women's doubles: Wei Yili & Zhang Yawen (CHN) beat Yang Wei & Zhang Jiewen (CHN) 21–16, 8–21, 24–22
  - Mixed doubles: Zheng Bo & Gao Ling (CHN) beat Anthony Clark & Donna Kellogg (ENG) 16–21, 21–18, 21–14
- Swiss Open (Basel, March 13—March 18)
  - Men's singles: Chen Jin (CHN) beat Simon Santoso (INA) 21–16, 21–10
  - Men's doubles: Koo Kien Keat & Tan Boon Heong (MAS) beat Jens Eriksen & Martin Lundgaard Hansen (DEN) 17–21, 21–16, 21–12
  - Women's singles: Zhang Ning (CHN) beat Lu Lan (CHN) 21–16, 21–18
  - Women's doubles: Yang Wei & Zhao Tingting (CHN) beat Lee Hyo-jung & Lee Kyung-won (KOR) 21–15, 21–10
  - Mixed doubles: Lee Yong-dae & Lee Hyo-jung (KOR) beat Muhammad Rijal & Greysia Polii (INA) 14–21, 21–16, 21–18
- Singapore Open (Singapore, May 1—May 6)
  - Men's singles: Boonsak Ponsana (THA) beat Chen Yu (CHN) 21–17, 21–14
  - Men's doubles: Fu Haifeng & Cai Yun (CHN) beat Choong Tan Fook & Lee Wan Wah (MAS) 16–21, 24–22, 21–18
  - Women's singles: Zhang Ning (CHN) beat Xie Xingfang (CHN) 21–18, 19–21, 21–3
  - Women's doubles: Zhang Yawen & Wei Yili (CHN) beat Zhao Tingting & Yang Wei (CHN) 10–21, 21–19, 21–18
  - Mixed doubles: Flandy Limpele & Vita Marissa (INA) beat Sudket Prapakamol & Saralee Thungthongkam (THA) 21–14, 21–13
- Indonesia Open (Jakarta, May 8—May 13)
  - Men's singles: Lee Chong Wei (MAS) beat Bao Chunlai (CHN) 21–15, 21–16
  - Men's doubles: Fu Haifeng & Cai Yun (CHN) beat Mohd Zakry Abdul Latif & Mohd Fairuzizuan Mohd Tazari (MAS) 21–17, 22–20
  - Women's singles: Wang Chen (HKG) beat Zhu Lin (CHN) 21–14, 21–13
  - Women's doubles: Du Jing & Yu Yang (CHN) beat Zhao Tingting & Yang Wei (CHN) 21–8, 16––21, 22–20
  - Mixed doubles: Zheng Bo & Gao Ling (CHN) beat Nova Widianto & Lilyana Natsir (INA) 21–16, 21–11
- China Masters (Chengdu, July 10—July 15)
  - Men's singles: Lin Dan (CHN) beat Wong Choong Hann (MAS) 21–19, 21–9
  - Men's doubles: Fu Haifeng & Cai Yun (CHN) beat Markis Kido & Hendra Setiawan (INA) 21–15, 21–16
  - Women's singles: Xie Xingfang (CHN) beat Zhang Ning (CHN) 21–11, 8–21, 23–21
  - Women's doubles: Lilyana Natsir & Vita Marissa (INA) beat Zhao Tingting & Yang Wei (CHN) 12–21, 21–15, 21–16
  - Mixed doubles: Zheng Bo & Gao Ling (CHN) beat Donna Kellogg & Anthony Clark (ENG) 21–16, 21–17
- Japan Open (Tokyo, September 11—September 16)
  - Men's singles: Lee Chong Wei (MAS) beat Taufik Hidayat (INA) 22–20, 19–21, 21–19
  - Men's doubles: Candra Wijaya (INA) & Tony Gunawan (USA) beat Luluk Hadiyanto & Alvent Yulianto (INA) 21–18, 21–17
  - Women's singles: Tine Rasmussen (DEN) beat Xie Xingfang (CHN) 21–15, 21–17
  - Women's doubles: Yang Wei & Zhang Jiewen (CHN) beat Zhao Tingting & Yu Yang (CHN) 21–17, 21–5
  - Mixed doubles: Zheng Bo & Gao Ling (CHN) beat Nova Widianto & Lilyana Natsir (INA) 21–19, 21–14
- Denmark Open (Odense, October 23—October 28)
  - Men's singles: Lin Dan (CHN) beat Bao Chunlai (CHN) 21–15, 21–12
  - Men's doubles: Koo Kien Keat & Tan Boon Heong (MAS) beat Jens Eriksen & Martin Lundgaard Hansen (DEN) 14–21, 21–14, 21–12
  - Women's singles: Lu Lan (CHN) beat Zhang Ning (CHN) 21–17, 21–14
  - Women's doubles: Yang Wei & Zhang Jiewen (CHN) beat Lee Kyung-won & Lee Hyo-jung (KOR) 12–21, 21–19, 21–19
  - Mixed doubles: He Hanbin & Yu Yang (CHN) beat Nathan Robertson & Gail Emms (ENG) 21–17, 19–21, 21–17
- French Open (Paris, October 30—November 4)
  - Men's singles: Lee Chong Wei (MAS) beat Bao Chunlai (CHN) 21–11, 21–14
  - Men's doubles: Fu Haifeng & Cai Yun (CHN) beat Choong Tan Fook & Lee Wan Wah (MAS) 21–14, 21–19
  - Women's singles: Xie Xingfang (CHN) beat Pi Hongyan (FRA) 21–13, 21–13
  - Women's doubles: Zhang Yawen & Wei Yili (CHN) beat Zhao Tingting & Yu Yang (CHN) 21–10, 21–15
  - Mixed doubles: Flandy Limpele & Vita Marissa (INA) beat Xie Zhongbo & Zhang Yawen (CHN) 21–11, 21–15
- China Open (Beijing, November 20—November 25)
  - Men's singles: Bao Chunlai (CHN) beat Lee Chong Wei (MAS) 21–12, 21–13
  - Men's doubles: Markis Kido & Hendra Setiawan (INA) beat Guo Zhendong & Xie Zhongbo (CHN) 21–12, 21–19
  - Women's singles: Wong Mew Choo (MAS) beat Xie Xingfang (CHN) 21–16, 8–21, 21–17
  - Women's doubles: Gao Ling & Zhao Tingting (CHN) beat Du Jing & Yu Yang (CHN) 17–21, 21–15, 21–8
  - Mixed doubles: Nova Widianto & Lilyana Natsir (INA) beat Sudket Prapakamol & Saralee Thungthongkam (THA) 15–21, 21–18, 21–11
- Hong Kong Open (Hong Kong, November 27—December 2)
  - Men's singles: Lin Dan (CHN) beat Lee Chong Wei (MAS) 9–21, 21–15, 21–15
  - Men's doubles: Markis Kido & Hendra Setiawan (INA) beat Candra Wijaya (INA) & Tony Gunawan (USA) 21–12, 18–21, 21–13
  - Women's singles: Xie Xingfang (CHN) beat Zhu Lin (CHN) 21–19, 21–14
  - Women's doubles: Du Jing & Yu Yang (CHN) beat Zhang Yawen & Wei Yili (CHN) 22–20, 13–21, 21–17
  - Mixed doubles: Nova Widianto & Lilyana Natsir (INA) beat Zheng Bo & Gao Ling (CHN) 21–23, 21–18, 21–19

== Level 4 ==
=== International Challenge ===
- Internacional de España 2007 (Madrid, May 24—May 27)
- White nights (Saint Petersburg, July 10—July 15)
- Turkiye International 2007 (Istanbul, August 30—September 2)
- Canadian Open 2007 (Saskatoon, Saskatchewan, September 4—September 8)
- Belgian International 2007 (Mechelen, September 6—September 9)
- Bulgarian International Championships'07 (Sofia, October 3—October 7)
- Norwegian International Championship 2007 (Oslo, November 15—November 18)
- Scottish International Championships 2007 (Glasgow, November 21—November 25)
- 2007 Irish International Championship (Lisburn, December 6—December 9)
- VII Italian International 2007 (Rome, December 11—December 14)

=== International Series ===
- Swedish International Stockholm 2007 (Täby, Stockholm, January 25—January 28)
- Austrian International Championships 2007 (Vienna, February 22—February 25)
- Croatian International 2007 (Zagreb, March 1—March 4)
- Banuinvest International Championships 2007 (Timișoara, March 22—March 25)
- Finnish International Championships 2007 (Helsinki, March 29—April 1)
- Van Zundert Velo Holland Open 2007 (Wateringen, April 12—April 15)
- 42nd Portuguese International Championships 2007 (Caldas da Rainha, April 19—April 22)
- 31st Intermedica Polish Open Championships 2007 (Inowłódz, Spała, April 26—April 29)
- 2007 Australian International (Brisbane, May 25—May 27)
- Asian Satellite 2007 (Singapore, May 30—June 2)
- 2007 Victorian International (Melbourne, July 12—July 15)
- North Shore City International (Auckland, July 19—July 22)
- 2007 Ballarat International (Melbourne, September 6—September 9)
- Waikato International 2007 (Hamilton, September 13—September 16)
- Czech International 2007 (Brno, September 20—September 23)
- Cyprus International 2007 (Nicosia, October 11—October 14)
- 32nd Hungarian International Champ 2007 (Budapest, November 1—November 4)
- Iceland Express International 2007 (Reykjavík, November 8—November 11)
- Welsh International 2007 (Cardiff, November 29—December 2)
- Hellas Victor 2007 (Thessaloniki, December 18—December 22)

=== Future Series ===
- XII Peru International (Lima, April 12—April 15)
- IX Miami Pan Am (2007) (Miami Lakes, Florida, April 19—April 21)
- Carebaco International Open 2007 (Suriname, June 7—June 10)
- Slovak International 2007 (Prešov, September 27—September 30)

== See also ==
- 2007 in sports
