= Broddi Kristjánsson =

Icelandic badminton player (born 1960)

Personal information
- Born: 8 December 1960 (age 65) Reykjavík, Iceland
- Height: 185 cm (6 ft 1 in)

Sport
- Country: Iceland
- Sport: Badminton
- Handedness: Right
- Event: Men's singles & men's doubles

Men's singles & men's doubles
- BWF profile
Medal record
Men's badminton
Representing Iceland
World Senior Championships
Gold medal – first place	2009 Huelva	Men's singles 45+
Bronze medal – third place	2015 Helsingborg	Men's singles 50+
Bronze medal – third place	2021 Huelva	Men's singles 60+

Broddi Kristjansson (born 8 December 1960) is a retired male badminton player from Iceland. After his retirement, he went on to win a gold medal at the BWF World Senior Championships in 2009.

== Career ==
Kristjansson competed in badminton at the 1992 Summer Olympics in men's singles. He lost in the first round to Teeranun Chiangta, of Thailand, 15–2, 15–12. He won more than 40 titles at the Icelandic National Badminton Championships.

== Achievements ==
=== World Senior Championships ===
Year	Venue	Event	Opponent	Score	Result
2009	Pabellón Municipal de Deportes Huelva, Huelva, Spain	Men's singles 45+	(Denmark) Kim Brodersen		Gold
2015	Helsingborg Arena, Helsingborg, Sweden	Men's singles 50+	(Chinese Taipei) Chang Wen-sung	15–21, 12–21	Bronze
2019	Palacio de los Deportes Carolina Marín, Huelva, Spain	Men's singles 60+	(Chinese Taipei) Chang Wen-sung	16–21, 10–21	Bronze

=== IBF International ===
Men's singles
Year	Tournament	Opponent	Score	Result
1991	Iceland International	(England) Matthew Smith	10–15, 15–10, 13–15	(silver) Runner-up
1992	Iceland International	(England) Michael Brown	10–15, 15–6, 9–15	(silver) Runner-up
1993	Iceland International	(England) Steve Butler	1–15, 3–15	(silver) Runner-up
1994	Iceland International	(Netherlands) Joris van Soerland	15–9, 15–11	(gold) Winner
1995	Iceland International	(Switzerland) Thomas Wapp	15–7, 17–14	(gold) Winner

Men's doubles
Year	Tournament	Partner	Opponent	Score	Result
1992	Amor International	(Iceland) Árni Þór Hallgrímson	(Scotland) Russell Hogg (Scotland) Kenny Middlemiss	4–15, 12–15	(silver) Runner-up
1993	Iceland International	(Iceland) Óli Björn Zimsen	(England) Julian Robertson (England) Dave Wright	2–15, 4–15	(silver) Runner-up
1994	Iceland International	(Iceland) Árni Þór Hallgrímson	(Netherlands) Ron Michels (Netherlands) Joris van Soerland	15–9, 15–9	(gold) Winner
1995	Iceland International	(Iceland) Árni Þór Hallgrímson	(Iceland) Njörður Ludvigsson (Iceland) Tryggvi Nielsen	17–16, 15–11	(gold) Winner
1995	Spanish International	(Iceland) Árni Þór Hallgrímson	(Portugal) Hugo Rodrigues (Portugal) Marco Vasconcelos	15–6, 15–12	(gold) Winner
1996	Iceland International	(Iceland) Árni Þór Hallgrímson	(Sweden) Fredrik Bergström (Sweden) Rasmus Wengberg	15–9, 8–15, 15–1	(gold) Winner
1997	Iceland International	(Iceland) Árni Þór Hallgrímson	(Denmark) Joachim Fischer Nielsen (Denmark) Niels Christian Kaldau	5–15, 7–15	(silver) Runner-up
1998	Iceland International	(Iceland) Árni Þór Hallgrímson	(Iceland) Tryggvi Nielsen (Iceland) Sveinn Sölvason	15–9, 15–10	(gold) Winner

Mixed doubles
Year	Tournament	Partner	Opponent	Score	Result
1995	Iceland International	(Iceland) Elsa Nielsen	(Iceland) Árni Þór Hallgrímson (Iceland) Guðrún Júlíusdóttir	3–15, 7–15	(silver) Runner-up
