= Gerda Voitechovskaja =

Lithuanian badminton player (born 1991)

Personal information
- Born: 15 May 1991 (age 35)

Sport
- Country: Lithuania; Iceland
- Sport: Badminton
- Handedness: Right

Women's singles & doubles
- Highest ranking: 154 (WS 19 October 2017); 96(WD 16 March 2017); 286 (XD 22 September 2011)
- BWF profile

Gerda Voitechovskaja (born 15 May 1991) is a Lithuanian badminton player. She has lived in Iceland since 2019, training and coaching at the BH club in Hafnarfjörður. She was crowned as the Icelandic national champions from 2023 to 2025.

== Achievements ==
=== BWF International Challenge/Series (3 titles) ===
Women's singles
Year	Tournament	Opponent	Score	Result
2016	Egypt International	(Egypt) Menna El-Tanany	21–14, 21–15	(gold) Winner

Women's doubles
Year	Tournament	Partner	Opponent	Score	Result
2016	Egypt International	(Belarus) Kristina Silich	(Egypt) Nadine Ashraf (Egypt) Menna El-Tanany	21–7, 21–14	(gold) Winner
2019	Kenya International	(Lithuania) Vytautė Fomkinaitė	(Egypt) Doha Hany (Egypt) Hadia Hosny	21–15, 21–17	(gold) Winner

BWF International Challenge tournament
BWF International Series tournament
BWF Future Series tournament
