= Iceland International =

Badminton championships

The Iceland International in badminton is an international open held in Iceland since 1986. The tournament belongs to the European Badminton Circuit. In 2008, the event had to be cancelled due to the 2008–2011 Icelandic financial crisis.

== Previous winners ==
Year	Men's singles	Women's singles	Men's doubles	Women's doubles	Mixed doubles	Ref
1986	(China) Wang Junjie	(Scotland) Elinor Allen	(Scotland) Alastair Baker (Scotland) Ross Glawin	(Iceland) Þórdís Edwald (Iceland) Kristín Magnúsdóttir	(Scotland) Alastair Baker (Scotland) Elinor Allen	
1987	(Iceland) Broddi Kristjánsson	(Iceland) Þórdís Edwald	(Iceland) Broddi Kristjánsson (Iceland) Þorsteinn Páll Hængsson	(Iceland) Þórdís Edwald (Iceland) Elisabet Þórðardóttir	(Iceland) Broddi Kristjánsson (Iceland) Kristín Magnúsdóttir	
1988	(United States) Chris Jogis	(Iceland) Guðrún Júlíusdóttir	(United States) John Britton (United States) Chris Jogis	(United States) Linda French (United States) Pam Owens	(United States) John Britton (United States) Pam Owens	
1989	(Iceland) Broddi Kristjánsson	(Iceland) Þórdís Edwald	(Iceland) Broddi Kristjánsson (Iceland) Þorsteinn Páll Hængsson	(Iceland) Guðrún Júlíusdóttir (Iceland) Kristín Magnúsdóttir	(Iceland) Broddi Kristjánsson (Iceland) Þórdís Edwald	
1990	(Iceland) Broddi Kristjánsson	(Iceland) Guðrún Júlíusdóttir	(Iceland) Broddi Kristjánsson (Iceland) Þorsteinn Páll Hængsson	(Iceland) Inga Kjartansdóttir (Netherlands) Paula Rip	(Iceland) Þorsteinn Páll Hængsson (Iceland) Inga Kjartansdóttir	
1991	(England) Matthew Smith	(Sweden) Lim Xiaoqing	(Iceland) Ármann Þorvaldsson (Iceland) Þorsteinn Páll Hængsson	(Sweden) Lim Xiaoqing (Iceland) Kristín Magnúsdóttir	(Iceland) Broddi Kristjánsson (Sweden) Lim Xiaoqing	
1992	(England) Mike Brown	(Scotland) Jennifer Allen	(England) Simon Archer (England) Julia Robertson	(Scotland) Elinor Allen (Scotland) Jennifer Allen	(Scotland) Kenny Middlemiss (Scotland) Elinor Allen	
1993	(England) Steve Butler	(Iceland) Elsa Nielsen	(England) Julian Robertson (England) Dave Wright	(England) Kerry McKittrick (England) Lorraine Thomas	(England) Dave Wright (England) Lorraine Thomas	
1994	(Iceland) Broddi Kristjánsson	(Iceland) Elsa Nielsen	(Iceland) Árni Þór Hallgrímsson (Iceland) Broddi Kristjánsson	(Iceland) Guðrún Júlíusdóttir (Iceland) Birna Petersen	(Iceland) Árni Þór Hallgrímsson (Iceland) Gudrun Juliusdottir	
1995	(Iceland) Broddi Kristjánsson	(Iceland) Elsa Nielsen	(Iceland) Árni Þór Hallgrímsson (Iceland) Broddi Kristjánsson	(Iceland) Vigdís Ásgeirsdóttir (Iceland) Elsa Nielsen	(Iceland) Árni Þór Hallgrímsson (Iceland) Gudrun Juliusdottir	
1996	(Sweden) Rasmus Wengberg	(Iceland) Elsa Nielsen	(Iceland) Árni Þór Hallgrímsson (Iceland) Broddi Kristjánsson	(Iceland) Vigdís Ásgeirsdóttir (Iceland) Elsa Nielsen	(Iceland) Árni Þór Hallgrímsson (Iceland) Vigdís Ásgeirsdóttir	
1997	(Denmark) Niels Christian Kaldau	(Denmark) Christina Sørensen	(Denmark) Joachim Fischer Nielsen (Denmark) Niels Christian Kaldau	(Denmark) Jane F. Bramsen (Denmark) Christina Sørensen	(Denmark) Joachim Fischer Nielsen (Denmark) Jane F. Bramsen	
1998	(England) Steffan Pandya	(England) Jill Pittard	(Iceland) Árni Þór Hallgrímsson (Iceland) Broddi Kristjánsson	(England) Lorraine Cole (England) Tracy Dineen	(Iceland) Tómas Viborg (Sweden) Emma Gustafsson	
1999	(Sweden) Rasmus Wengberg	(Sweden) Karolina Ericsson	(Sweden) Henrik Andersson (Sweden) Fredrik Bergström	(Iceland) Vigdís Ásgeirsdóttir (Iceland) Drífa Harðardóttir	(Sweden) Fredrik Bergström (Sweden) Jenny Karlsson	
2000	(England) Colin Haughton	(England) Rebecca Pantaney	(England) Peter Jeffrey (England) David Lindley	(England) Natalie Munt (England) Liza Parker	(England) David Lindley (England) Emma Chaffin	
2001	(England) Matthew Shuker	(England) Elizabeth Cann	(Germany) Jochen Cassel (Germany) Ingo Kindervater	(Iceland) Vigdís Ásgeirsdóttir (Iceland) Ragna Ingólfsdóttir	(Denmark) Thomas Laybourn (Denmark) Karina Sørensen	
2002	(Canada) Bobby Milroy	(Bulgaria) Petya Nedelcheva	(Denmark) Dennis Jensen (Denmark) Peter Steffensen	(Scotland) Kirsteen McEwan (Scotland) Yuan Wemyss	(Denmark) Peter Steffensen (Denmark) Karina Sørensen	
2003	(Denmark) Joachim Fischer Nielsen	(Bulgaria) Petya Nedelcheva	(Denmark) Joachim Fischer Nielsen (Denmark) Jesper Larsen	(Bulgaria) Petya Nedelcheva (Bulgaria) Neli Boteva	(England) Simon Archer (England) Donna Kellogg	
2004	(Canada) Bobby Milroy	(Scotland) Susan Hughes	(England) Paul Trueman (England) Ian Palethorpe	(England) Liza Parker (England) Suzanne Rayappan	(England) Peter Jeffrey (England) Hayley Connor	
2005	(Denmark) Jens-Kristian Leth	(Sweden) Sara Persson	(Denmark) Anders Kristiansen (Denmark) Simon Mollyhus	(Sweden) Elin Bergblom (Sweden) Johanna Persson	(Sweden) Henri Hurskainen (Sweden) Johanna Persson	
2006	(Sweden) Magnus Sahlberg	(Iceland) Ragna Ingólfsdóttir	(Denmark) Christoffer Bruun Jensen (Denmark) Morten Kronborg	(Scotland) Imogen Bankier (Scotland) Emma Mason	(Sweden) Henri Hurskainen (Sweden) Emma Wengberg	
2007	(Czech Republic) Petr Koukal	(Iceland) Ragna Ingólfsdóttir	(Denmark) Jonas Glyager Jensen (Denmark) Peter Hasbak	(Iceland) Katrín Atladóttir (Iceland) Ragna Ingólfsdóttir	(Denmark) Jonas Glyager Jensen (Denmark) Maria Kaaberbøl Thorberg	
2008	No competition					
2009	(Denmark) Christian Lind Thomsen	(Iceland) Ragna Ingólfsdóttir	(Denmark) René Lindskow (Denmark) Anders Skaarup Rasmussen	(Iceland) Ragna Ingólfsdóttir (Iceland) Snjólaug Jóhannsdóttir	(Denmark) Theis Christiansen (Denmark) Joan Christiansen	
2010	(Denmark) Kim Bruun	(Iceland) Ragna Ingólfsdóttir	(Denmark) Emil Holst (Denmark) Mikkel Mikkelsen	(Iceland) Katrín Atladóttir (Iceland) Ragna Ingólfsdóttir	(Denmark) Frederik Colberg (Denmark) Mette Poulsen	
2011	(Sweden) Mathias Borg	(Iceland) Ragna Ingólfsdóttir	(Denmark) Thomas Dew-Hattens (Denmark) Mathias Kany	(Iceland) Tinna Helgadóttir (Iceland) Snjólaug Jóhannsdóttir	(Denmark) Thomas Dew-Hattens (Denmark) Louise Hansen	
2012	(Chinese Taipei) Chou Tien-chen	(Chinese Taipei) Chiang Mei-hui	(Wales) Joe Morgan (Wales) Nic Strange	(South Korea) Lee So-hee (South Korea) Shin Seung-chan	(Chinese Taipei) Chou Tien-chen (Chinese Taipei) Chiang Mei-hui	
2013	No competition					
2014	(Malaysia) Beryno Wong	(Finland) Airi Mikkelä	(Scotland) Martin Campbell (Scotland) Patrick MacHugh	(Wales) Sarah Thomas (Wales) Carissa Turner	(Denmark) Alexander Bond (Denmark) Ditte Søby Hansen	
2015	(Czech Republic) Milan Ludík	(Denmark) Mette Poulsen	(Scotland) Martin Campbell (Scotland) Patrick MacHugh	(Denmark) Lena Grebak (Denmark) Maria Helsbøl	(Denmark) Nicklas Mathiasen (Denmark) Cecilie Bjergen	
2016	(Denmark) Kim Bruun	(Denmark) Julie Dawall Jakobsen	(England) Chris Coles (Scotland) Adam Hall	(England) Jessica Pugh (England) Sarah Walker	(Finland) Anton Kaisti (Netherlands) Cheryl Seinen	
2017	(India) Subhankar Dey	(Malaysia) Yang Li Lian	(Poland) Paweł Prądziński (Poland) Jan Rudziński	(Malaysia) Lyddia Cheah Yi Yu (Malaysia) Yang Li Lian	(England) Callum Hemming (England) Fee Teng Liew	
2018	(England) Sam Parsons	(India) Saili Rane	(Scotland) Alexander Dunn (Scotland) Adam Hall	(Scotland) Julie MacPherson (Scotland) Eleanor O'Donnell	(India) Rohan Kapoor (India) Kuhoo Garg	
2019	(Denmark) Mikkel Enghøj	(Switzerland) Ayla Huser	(Portugal) Bruno Carvalho (Portugal) Tomás Nero	(England) Abigail Holden (England) Sian Kelly	(Iceland) Kristófer Darri Finnsson (Iceland) Margrét Jóhannsdóttir	
2020	(Indonesia) Fathurrahman Fauzi	(Scotland) Rachel Sugden	(Finland) Anton Monnberg (Finland) Jesper Paul	(England) Asmita Chaudhari (England) Pamela Reyes	(England) Alex Green (England) Annie Lado	
2021	Cancelled (Note: This tournament, originally to be played from 28–31 January, was later cancelled due to the COVID-19 pandemic in Iceland.)					
2022	Cancelled (Note: This tournament, originally to be played from 27–30 January, was later cancelled due to the COVID-19 pandemic in Iceland.)					
2023	(Germany) Matthias Kicklitz	(Denmark) Frederikke Lund	(Denmark) Jonas Kudsk (Denmark) Jeppe Søby	(England) Abbygael Harris (England) Annie Lado	(England) Brandon Yap (England) Annie Lado	
2024	(Denmark) Mads Juel Møller	(Switzerland) Milena Schnider	(Denmark) Benjamin Illum Klindt (Denmark) Magnus Klinggaard	(Denmark) Sophia Lemming (Denmark) Cathrine Marie Wind	(Denmark) Mikkel Klinggaard (Denmark) Naja Abildgaard	
2025	(Denmark) Karan Rajan Rajarajan	(Scotland) Rachel Sugden	(Netherlands) Andy Buijk (France) Aymeric Tores	(Netherlands) Kirsten de Wit (Netherlands) Meerte Loos	(Denmark) Mikkel Klinggaard (Denmark) Nicoline Tang	
2026	(Denmark) Mikkel Langemark	(Chinese Taipei) Huang Sheng-chun	(France) Baptiste Labarthe (France) Quentin Ronget	(Individual Neutral Athletes) Anastasiia Boiarun (Individual Neutral Athletes) Daria Kharlampovich	(Switzerland) Yann Orteu (Switzerland) Caroline Racloz	

== Performances by nation ==
As of the 2026 edition

Rank	Nation	MS	WS	MD	WD	XD	Total
1	Iceland	5	13	8	13	8	47
2	Denmark	10	4	11	3	11	39
3	England	7	3	4.5	8	7	29.5
4	Scotland		5	4.5	4	2	15.5
5	Sweden	4	3	1	1.5	4	13.5
6	Chinese Taipei	1	2			1	4
6	United States	1		1	1	1	4
8	Bulgaria		2		1		3
8	India	1	1			1	3
8	Malaysia	1	1		1		3
8	Switzerland		2			1	3
12	Finland		1	1		0.5	2.5
12	Netherlands			0.5	1.5	0.5	2.5
14	Canada	2					2
14	Czech Republic	2					2
14	Germany	1		1			2
14	Wales			1	1		2
18	France			1.5			1.5
19	China	1					1
19	Indonesia	1					1
19	Poland			1			1
19	Portugal			1			1
19	Russia				1		1
19	South Korea				1		1
Total		37	37	37	37	37	182
