= Chiang Ying-li =

Taiwanese badminton player (born 1992)

Chiang Ying-li 江穎麗
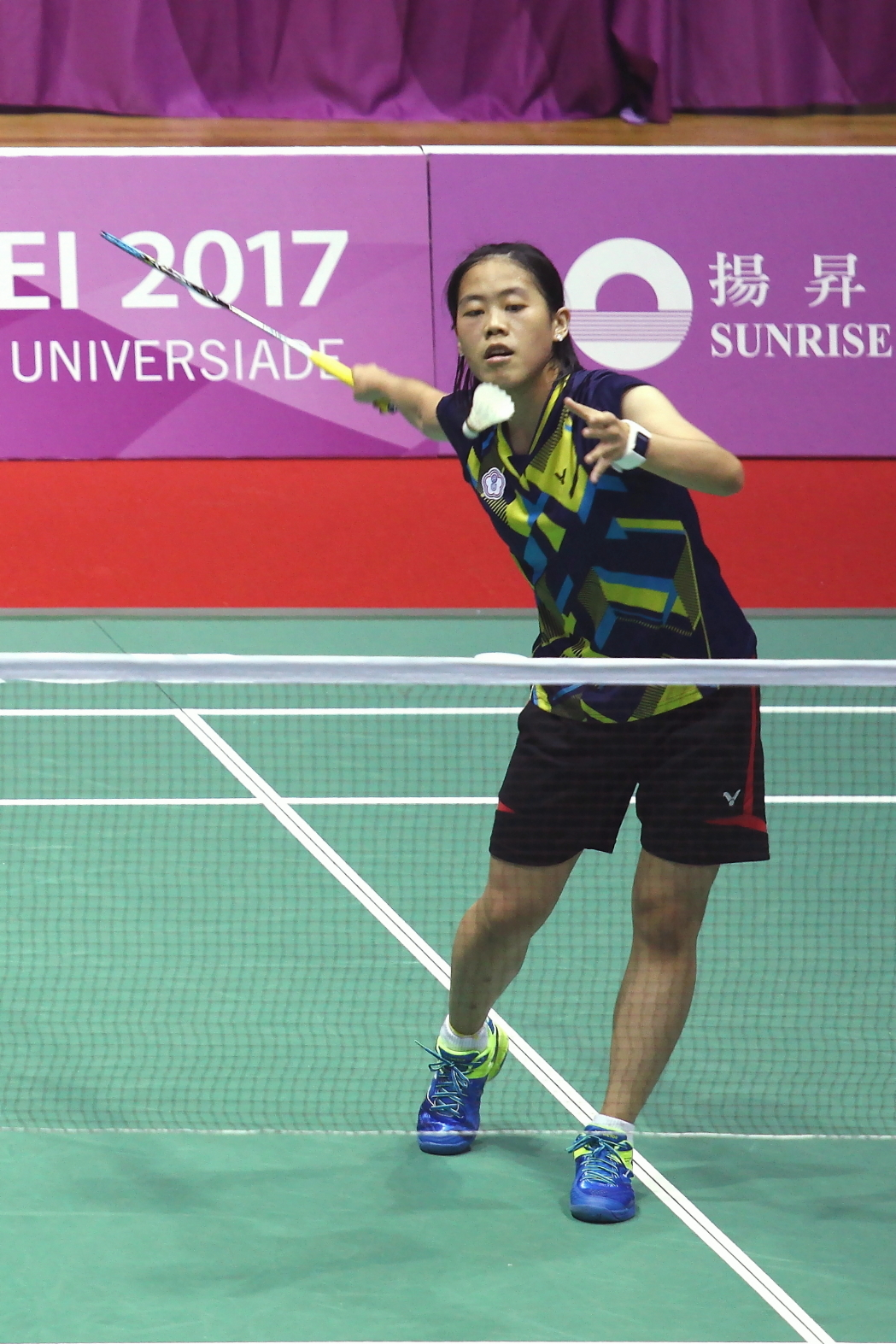

Personal information
- Born: Chiang Mei-hui 江美慧; 8 October 1992 (age 34)
- Height: 1.65 m (5 ft 5 in)
- Weight: 59 kg (130 lb)

Sport
- Country: Taiwan
- Sport: Badminton
- Handedness: Right

Women's singles and doubles
- Highest ranking: 25 (WS 15 June 2017); 133 (WD 8 October 2009); 141 (XD 4 April 2013)
- BWF profile
Medal record
Women's badminton
Representing Chinese Taipei
Summer Universiade
Gold medal – first place	2017 Taipei	Mixed team
Bronze medal – third place	2017 Taipei	Women's singles

Chiang Ying-li (Chinese: 江穎麗; pinyin: Jiāng Yǐnglì; Wade–Giles: Chiang Ying-li; born 8 October 1992) is a Taiwanese badminton player.

== Achievement ==
=== Summer Universiade ===
Women's singles
Year	Venue	Opponent	Score	Result
2017	Taipei Gymnasium, Taipei, Taiwan	(Chinese Taipei) Tai Tzu-ying	15–21, 13–21	Bronze

=== BWF International Challenge/Series (3 titles, 4 runners-up) ===
Women's singles
Year	Tournament	Opponent	Score	Result
2012	Iceland International	(Russia) Romina Gabdullina	21–17, 21–17	(gold) Winner
2012	Welsh International	(Bulgaria) Petya Nedelcheva	19–21, 21–19, 21–17	(gold) Winner
2014	Auckland International	(Chinese Taipei) Lee Chia-hsin	11–8, 4–11, 8–11, 11–5, 5–11	(silver) Runner-up
2023	Luxembourg Open	(Japan) Hina Akechi	21–18, 15–21, 12–21	(silver) Runner-up

Women's doubles
Year	Tournament	Partner	Opponent	Score	Result
2013	Polish International	(Chinese Taipei) Hsu Ya-ching	(Chinese Taipei) Lee Chia-hsin (Chinese Taipei) Wu Ti-jung	10–21, 16–21	(silver) Runner-up
2014	Maribyrnong International	(Indonesia) Setyana Mapasa	(Australia) He Tian Tang (Australia) Renuga Veeran	19–21, 23–25	(silver) Runner-up

Mixed doubles
Year	Tournament	Partner	Opponent	Score	Result
2012	Iceland International	(Chinese Taipei) Chou Tien-chen	(Iceland) Helgi Johannesson (Iceland) Elin Thora Eliasdottir	21–16, 21–9	(gold) Winner

BWF International Challenge tournament
BWF International Series tournament
BWF Future Series tournament

=== World University Championships ===
Women's singles
Year	Venue	Opponent	Score	Result
2016	Ramenskoye, Russia	(Japan) Ayaho Sugino	18–21, 14–21	(silver) Runner-up
