= Annie Lado =

English badminton player (born 2002)

Personal information
- Born: 23 February 2002 (age 24) Winchester, Hampshire, England
- Height: 170 cm (5 ft 7 in)

Sport
- Country: England
- Sport: Badminton

Women's & mixed doubles
- Highest ranking: 65 (WD with Abbygael Harris, 26 September 2023); 71 (XD with Ethan van Leeuwen, 19 March 2024)
- Current ranking: 70 (WD with Sian Kelly, 15 April 2025)

Annie Lado (born 23 February 2002) is an English badminton player.

== Career ==
In 2022, she won her first national title at the English National Badminton Championships after winning the women's doubles with Abbygael Harris.

As of 23 August 2023, she reached a doubles world ranking high (with Harris) of 66.

== Achievements ==
=== BWF International Challenge/Series (6 titles, 7 runners-up) ===
Women's doubles
Year	Tournament	Partner	Opponent	Score	Result
2020	Iceland International	(England) Holly Williams	(England) Asmita Chaudhari (England) Pamela Reyes	19–21, 15–21	(silver) Runner-up
2022	Hungarian International	(England) Abbygael Harris	(England) Lizzie Tolman (England) Hope Warner	21–16, 16–21, 22–20	(gold) Winner
2023	Iceland International	(England) Abbygael Harris	(Italy) Katharina Fink (Italy) Yasmine Hamza	21–13, 21–18	(gold) Winner
2023	Polish International	(England) Abbygael Harris	(Turkey) Bengisu Erçetin (Turkey) Nazlıcan İnci	16–21, 10–21	(silver) Runner-up
2024	Portugal International	(England) Abbygael Harris	(England) Chloe Birch (England) Estelle van Leeuwen	16–21, 9–21	(silver) Runner-up
2024	Nantes International	(England) Abbygael Harris	(England) Chloe Birch (England) Estelle van Leeuwen	18–21, 9–21	(silver) Runner-up

Mixed doubles
Year	Tournament	Partner	Opponent	Score	Result
2019	Iceland International	(England) Ethan van Leeuwen	(Iceland) Kristofer Darri Finnsson (Iceland) Margrét Jóhannsdóttir	13–21, 18–21	(silver) Runner-up
2020	Iceland International	(England) Alex Green	(Scotland) Joshua Apiliga (Scotland) Rachel Sugden	21–19, 21–17	(gold) Winner
2022	Hungarian International	(England) Rory Easton	(Denmark) Mads Vestergaard (Denmark) Clara Løber	21–18, 21–17	(gold) Winner
2022	Italian International	(England) Rory Easton	(Denmark) Jesper Toft (Denmark) Clara Graversen	19–21, 16–21	(silver) Runner-up
2023	Iceland International	(England) Brandon Yap	(Denmark) Hjalte Johansen (Denmark) Emma Irring Braüner	13–21, 21–12, 23–21	(gold) Winner
2023	Dutch International	(England) Brandon Yap	(Australia) Kenneth Choo (Australia) Gronya Somerville	18–21, 23–21	(silver) Runner-up
2023	Austrian Open	(England) Ethan van Leeuwen	(Malaysia) Lim Tze Jian (Malaysia) Desiree Siow Hao Shan	21–13, 21–13	(gold) Winner

BWF International Challenge tournament
BWF International Series tournament
BWF Future Series tournament
