= Magnús Ingi Helgason =

Icelandic badminton player (born 1980)

Personal information
- Born: 5 April 1980 (age 46)

Sport
- Country: Iceland
- Sport: Badminton

Men's singles & doubles
- Highest ranking: 211 (MS 21 January 2010); 89 (MD 21 January 2010); 302 (XD 24 May 2012)
- BWF profile

Magnús Ingi Helgason (born 5 April 1980) is an Icelandic badminton player.

== Achievements ==
=== BWF International Challenge/Series ===
Men's doubles
Year	Tournament	Partner	Opponent	Score	Result
2011	Iceland International	(Iceland) Helgi Jóhannesson	(Denmark) Thomas Dew-Hattens (Denmark) Mathias Kany	21–16, 12–21, 16–21	(silver) Runner-up
2008	Slovak Open	(Iceland) Helgi Jóhannesson	(Czech Republic) Jakub Bitman (Croatia) Zvonimir Durkinjak	21–11, 21–14	(gold) Winner
2008	Cyprus International	(Iceland) Helgi Jóhannesson	(Denmark) Martin Baatz Olsen (Denmark) Thomas Fynbo	21–18, 21–16	(gold) Winner

BWF International Challenge tournament
BWF International Series tournament
BWF Future Series tournament
