= Margrét Jóhannsdóttir =

Icelandic badminton player (born 1995)

Personal information
- Born: 10 January 1995 (age 31)

Sport
- Country: Iceland
- Sport: Badminton

Women's singles & doubles
- Highest ranking: 244 (WS 15 June 2017); 217 (WD 29 March 2018); 246 (XD 10 May 2018)
- BWF profile

Margrét Jóhannsdóttir (born 10 January 1995) is an Icelandic badminton player.

== Achievements ==
=== BWF International Challenge/Series (1 title, 2 runners-up) ===
Women's doubles
Year	Tournament	Partner	Opponent	Score	Result
2019	Iceland International	(Iceland) Sigríður Árnadóttir	(England) Abigail Holden (England) Sian Kelly	21–23, 18–21	(silver) Runner-up
2014	Iceland International	(Iceland) Sara Högnadóttir	(Wales) Sarah Thomas (Wales) Carissa Turner	11–21, 8–21	(silver) Runner-up

Mixed doubles
Year	Tournament	Partner	Opponent	Score	Result
2019	Iceland International	(Iceland) Kristófer Darri Finnsson	(England) Ethan van Leeuwen (England) Annie Lado	21–13, 21–18	(gold) Winner

BWF International Challenge tournament
BWF International Series tournament
BWF Future Series tournament
