= Ármann Þorvaldsson =

Icelandic badminton player

Ármann Þorvaldsson (born in Reykjavík in 1968) was an Icelandic badminton player and was the UK CEO of Kaupthing Bank at the time of its collapse in 2008.

== Early life ==
Ármann graduated from Fjölbrautaskólinn í Breiðholti in 1989, taking a BA in history from the University of Iceland in 1992 and an MBA at Boston University in 1994. He married Þórdís Edwald; both played badminton at an international level.

== Banking career ==
In 1994, Ármann joined the Icelandic company Kaupthing as Director of Planning and Budgeting, subsequently serving as managing director of investment banking from 1997 to 2005. He became a director of Kaupthing Singer & Friedlander Group PLC on 26 July 2005, and on 25 October 2005 he became CEO of Kaupthing Singer & Friedlander Group PLC (formerly, Singer & Friedlander Group PLC) at Kaupthing Bank hf.

After the collapse of Kaupþing, Ármann wrote an autobiographical account of Iceland's boom and the 2008–2011 Icelandic financial crisis which was intended as a defence of his role and his colleagues'.

While Ármann was investigated by the UK's Serious Fraud Office following Kaupþing's collapse, he was not charged. The UK's Financial Services Authority 'said it had not found any regulatory breaches against' Ármann.

Ármann became CEO of Kvika banki in June 2017. In May 2019, it was announced that he'd become deputy CEO.

== Badminton career ==
Ármann won the Icelandic National Badminton Championships in the men's doubles event in 1988 and 1989. He clinched the Iceland International tournament partnered with Þorsteinn Páll Hængsson in 1991.
