= Mark Richards (badminton) =

Welsh international badminton player

Personal information
- Nationality: British (Welsh)
- Born: circa.1962 Cardiff, Wales

Sport
- Sport: Badminton
Medal record
Representing Wales
Welsh Nationals
Gold medal – first place	1992	men's singles

Mark Richards (born circa.1962) is a former international badminton player from Wales who competed at the Commonwealth Games and is former champion of Wales.

== Biography ==
Richards, from Pontypridd, was a Welsh international. In 1980, he won the singles and doubles at the Cambridgeshire Open. and one year later in 1981, was awarded a grant from the Welsh Sports Trust.

Richards represented the Welsh team at the 1982 Commonwealth Games in Brisbane, Australia, where he competed in the badminton events.

In 1986 he suffered a major career setback when he broke his leg in seven places playing football and it took until 1990 for him to regain the Welsh number one ranking. Living at Cardiff Road in Treforest at the time, he won the 1990 Cornish Open, becoming the first Welshman to win an English Open tournament since 1987.

He earned 39 caps for his country and was the 1992 singles champion of Wales at the Welsh National Badminton Championships.
