= Helgi Jóhannesson =

Icelandic badminton player (born 1982)

Personal information
- Born: 18 November 1982 (age 43)

Sport
- Country: Iceland
- Sport: Badminton

Men's singles & doubles
- Highest ranking: 228 (MS 26 November 2009); 89 (MD 21 January 2010); 145 (XD 2 September 2010)
- BWF profile

Helgi Jóhannesson (born 18 November 1982) is an Icelandic badminton player.

== Achievements ==
=== BWF International Challenge/Series ===
Men's doubles
Year	Tournament	Partner	Opponent	Score	Result
2001	Iceland International	(Iceland) Njörður Ludvigsson	(Germany) Jochen Cassel (Germany) Ingo Kindervater	7–0, 6–8, 4–7, 1–7	(silver) Runner-up
2008	Cyprus International	(Iceland) Magnús Ingi Helgason	(Denmark) Martin Baatz Olsen (Denmark) Thomas Fynbo	21–18, 21–16	(gold) Winner
2008	Slovak Open	(Iceland) Magnús Ingi Helgason	(Czech Republic) Jakub Bitman (Croatia) Zvonimir Đurkinjak	21–11, 21–14	(gold) Winner
2011	Iceland International	(Iceland) Magnús Ingi Helgason	(Denmark) Thomas Dew-Hattens (Denmark) Mathias Kany	21–16, 12–21, 16–21	(silver) Runner-up

Mixed doubles
Year	Tournament	Partner	Opponent	Score	Result
2012	Iceland International	(Iceland) Elín Þóra Elíasdóttir	(Chinese Taipei) Chou Tien-chen (Chinese Taipei) Chiang Mei-hui	16–21, 9–21	(silver) Runner-up

BWF International Challenge tournament
BWF International Series tournament
BWF Future Series tournament
