= Ragna Ingólfsdóttir =

Icelandic badminton player (born 1983)

Personal information
- Born: Ragna Björg Ingólfsdóttir; 22 February 1983 (age 43) Reykjavík, Iceland
- Height: 1.80 m (5 ft 11 in)
- Weight: 70 kg (154 lb)

Sport
- Country: Iceland
- Sport: Badminton
- Handedness: Right

Women's singles
- Highest ranking: 64 (17 November 2011)
- BWF profile
Medal record
Women's badminton
Representing Iceland
Helvetia Cup
Gold medal – first place	2007 Reykjavík	Mixed team

Ragna Björg Ingólfsdóttir (born 22 February 1983) is an Icelandic former badminton player. She represented Iceland in 2008 Beijing and again at the 2012 London Summer Olympics. She trained at the Tennis og badmintonfélag Reykjavíku, and educated philosophy of psychology at the University of Iceland. In 2011, she commented on skirts boosting popularity in badminton. Following the 2012 Olympics, she announced her retirement from the sport.

== Achievements ==
=== BWF International Challenge/Series ===
Women's singles
Year	Tournament	Opponent	Score	Result
2011	Welsh International	(Switzerland) Nicole Schaller	1–3 Retired	(silver) Runner-up
2011	Iceland International	(Lithuania) Akvile Stapusaityte	21–18, 17–21, 21–17	(gold) Winner
2011	Lithuanian International	(Republic of Ireland) Chloe Magee	11–21, 21–23	(silver) Runner-up
2010	Iceland International	(Malaysia) Anita Raj Kaur	21–17, 21–18	(gold) Winner
2009	Iceland International	(Denmark) Camilla Overgaard	21–14, 16–21, 21–13	(gold) Winner
2007	Hellas International	(Bulgaria) Petya Nedelcheva	Walkover	(silver) Runner-up
2007	Iceland International	(Denmark) Trine Niemeier	21–11, 21–3	(gold) Winner
2007	Hungarian International	(Switzerland) Jeanine Cicognini	21–13, 21–18	(gold) Winner
2007	Victorian International	(Ukraine) Larisa Griga	11–21, 10–21	(silver) Runner-up
2006	Iceland International	(Scotland) Susan Hughes	21–14, 11–21, 21–12	(gold) Winner
2006	Czech International	(Denmark) Camilla Sørensen	Walkover	(gold) Winner

Women's doubles
Year	Tournament	Partner	Opponent	Score	Result
2010	Iceland International	(Iceland) Katrín Atladóttir	(Iceland) Erla Björg Hafsteinsdóttir (Iceland) Tinna Helgadóttir	21–14, 21–13	(gold) Winner
2009	Iceland International	(Iceland) Snjólaug Jóhannsdóttir	(Iceland) Brynja Pétursdóttir (Iceland) Erla Björg Hafsteinsdóttir	21–10, 21–13	(gold) Winner
2007	Iceland International	(Iceland) Katrín Atladóttir	(Iceland) Sara Jónsdóttir (Iceland) Tinna Helgadóttir	21–18, 21–23, 21–17	(gold) Winner
2007	Cyprus International	(Estonia) Kati Tolmoff	(India) Jwala Gutta (India) Shruti Kurian	12–21, 13–21	(silver) Runner-up
2006	Iceland International	(Iceland) Tinna Helgadóttir	(Scotland) Emma Mason (Scotland) Imogen Bankier	16–21, 19–21	(silver) Runner-up
2004	Bulgarian International	(Iceland) Sara Jónsdóttir	(Bulgaria) Diana Dimova (Bulgaria) Linda Zechiri	15–13, 15–11	(gold) Winner
2003	Slovenian International	(Iceland) Sara Jónsdóttir	(Russia) Elena Shimko (Russia) Marina Yakusheva	6–15, 3–15	(silver) Runner-up
2003	Dominican Republic International	(Iceland) Sara Jónsdóttir	(Canada) Helen Nichol (Canada) Charmaine Reid	7–15, 9–15	(silver) Runner-up
2001	Iceland International	(Iceland) Vigdís Ásgeirsdóttir	(Iceland) Katrín Atladóttir (Iceland) Sara Jónsdóttir	7–0, 7–2, 7–1	(gold) Winner

BWF International Challenge tournament
BWF International Series tournament
BWF Future Series tournament
