= Elsa Nielsen (badminton) =

Icelandic badminton player (born 1974)

Personal information
- Nationality: Icelandic
- Born: 26 June 1974 (age 50)

Sport
- Sport: Badminton

Elsa Nielsen (born 26 June 1974) is an Icelandic badminton player. She competed in women's singles at the 1992 Summer Olympics in Barcelona, and in women's singles at the 1996 Summer Olympics in Atlanta.
