= Árni Þór Hallgrímsson =

Icelandic badminton player (born 1968)

Árni Þór Hallgrímson
Personal information
- Nationality: Icelandic
- Born: 10 March 1968 (age 58)

Sport
- Sport: Badminton

Árni Þór Hallgrímson (born 10 March 1968) is an Icelandic badminton player. He competed in two events at the 1992 Summer Olympics.
