= 1948 in Denmark =

- Decades: 1920s; 1930s; 1940s; 1950s; 1960s
- See also: Other events of 1948; List of years in Denmark

Events from the year 1948 in Denmark.

== Incumbents ==
- Monarch – Frederik IX
- Prime minister – Hans Hedtoft

== Sports ==
=== Badminton ===
- 3–6 March – 1948 All England Badminton Championships
  - Jørn Skaarup wins gold in Men's Single
  - Kirsten Thorndahl wins gold in Women's Single
  - Preben Dabelsteen and Børge Frederiksen win gold in Men's Double
  - Tonny Ahm and Kirsten Thorndahl win gold in Women's Double* Jørn Skaarup and Kirsten Thorndahl win gold in Mixed Double
- 22 April – Hvidovre Badminton Club is founded.

=== Football ===
- KB wins the 1947–48 Danish 1st Division. It is their ninth Danish football championship.

== Births ==
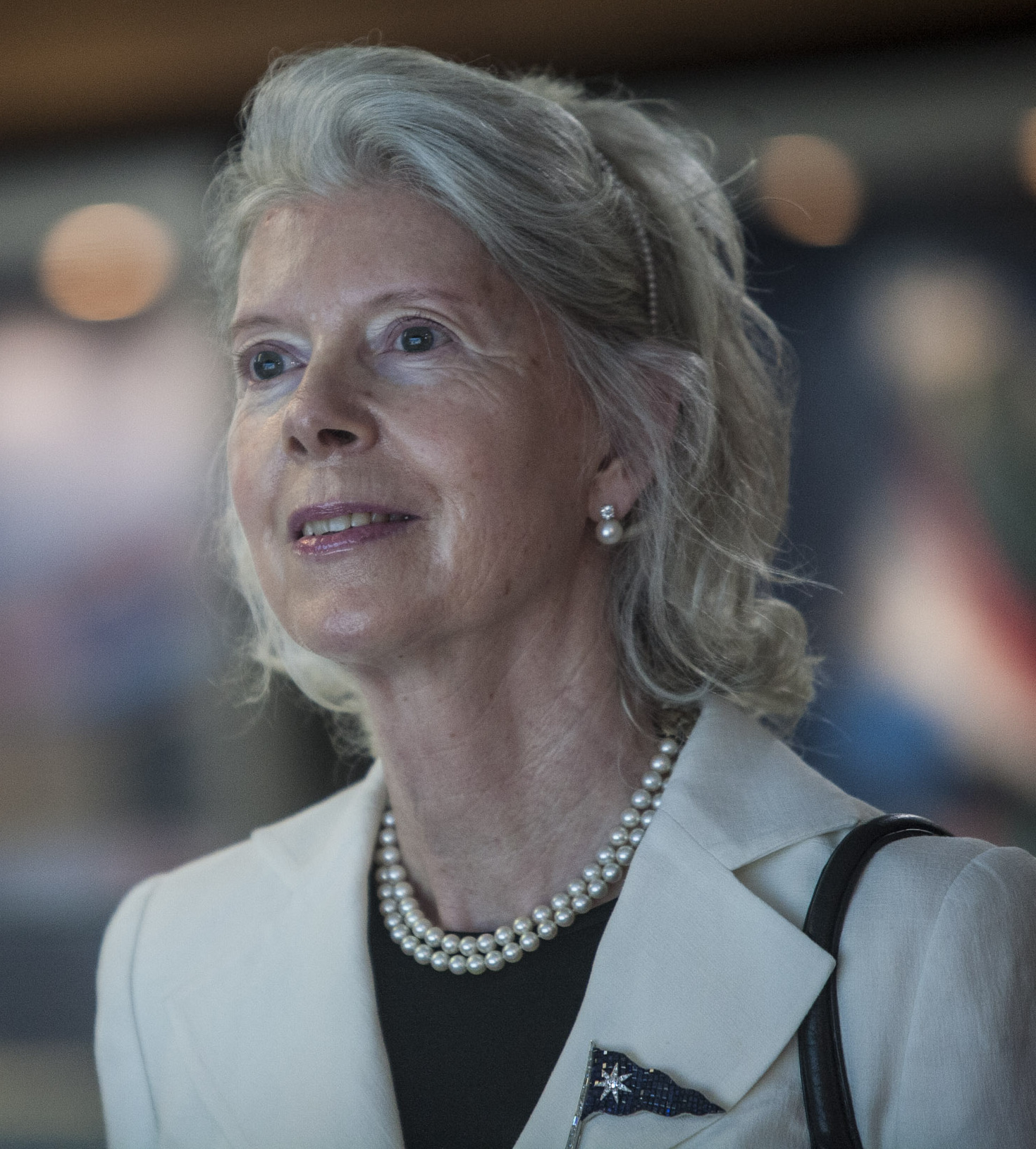
Ane Mærsk Mc-Kinney Uggla.

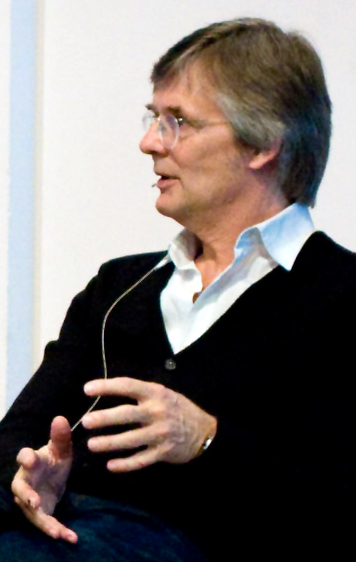
Bille August.

=== January–March ===
- 27 January – Harriet Bjerrum Nielsen, philologist and gender studies scholar
- 12 March – Ole Thestrup, actor (died 2018)

=== April–June ===
- 2 April – Roald Als, cartoonist and writer
- 16 May – Jesper Christensen, actor

=== July–September ===
- 3 July – Ane Mærsk Mc-Kinney Uggla, business executive
- 16 August – Lars Larsen, businessman, company founder (died 2019)
- 21 August – Sonja Albrink, politician (died 2012)
- 1 September – Birthe Kjær, singer

=== October–December ===
- 8 October – Hans Engell, journalist, politician minister of justice
- 22 October – Bo Holten, composer and conductor
- 25 October – Suste Bonnén, photographer
- 9 November – Bille August, Oscar-winning film director
- 7 December – Mads Vinding, jazz bassist

== Deaths ==
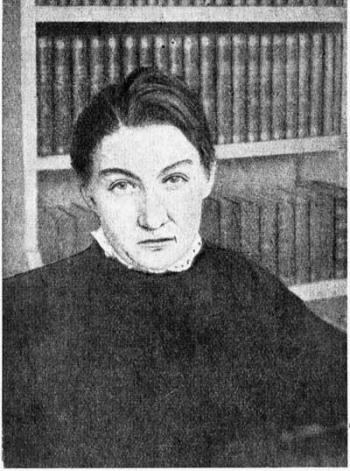
Ellen Jørgen.

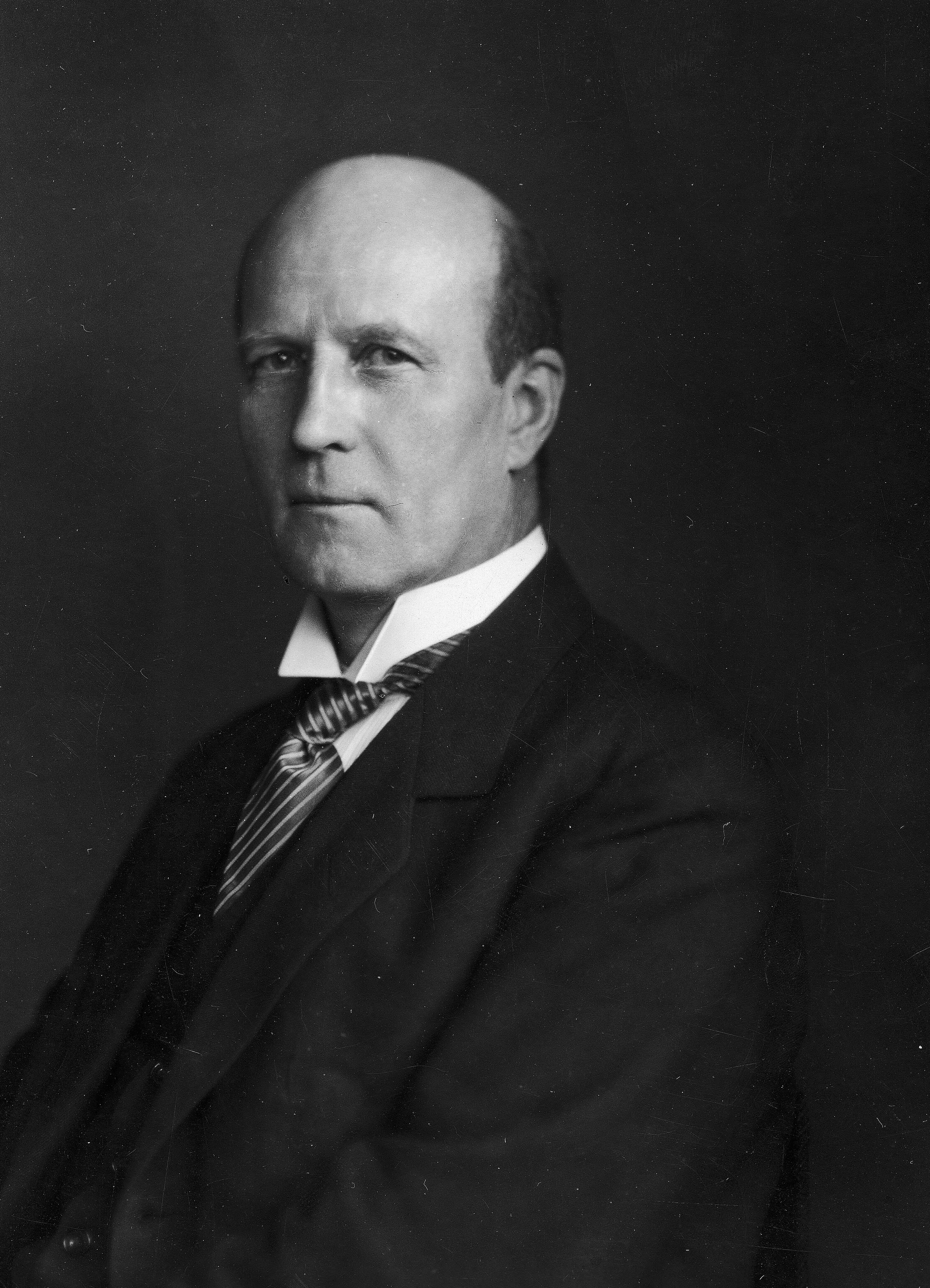
Peter Rochegune Munch.

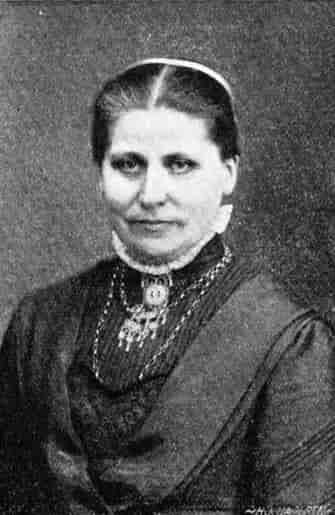
Ingeborg Appel.

=== January–March ===
- 7 February – Carl Andreas Koefoed, agronomist (born 1855)
- 27 February – Svend Hammershøi, painter and ceramist (born 1873)
- 24 March – Vilhelm Arnesen, painter (born 1865)

=== April–June ===
- 13 April – John Christmas Møller, politician, foreign minister (born 1894)
- 24 May – Adolph Jensen, economist and statistician (born 1866)
- 26 May – Rikard Magnussen, sculptor (died 1885)
- 7 June – Anne Knudsen, anthropologist, editor, journalist and researcher (died 2022)
- 14 June – Ellen Jørgensen, historian and librarian (born 1877)

=== July–September ===
- 8 July – Peter Rochegune Munch, historian and politician (born 1870)
- 21 August – Ole Falkentorp, architect (born 1886)
- 13 September – Henning Haslund-Christensen, travel writer and anthropologist (born 1896)

=== October–December ===
- 4 October – Camillo Carlsen, composer (born 1876)
- 5 November – Ingeborg Appel, educator (born 1869)
- 1 December – Herman Vedel, painter and portraitist (born 1875)
