= 1957 Uber Cup squads =

This article lists the squads for the 1957 Uber Cup participating teams. The age listed for each player is on 13 March 1957 which was the first day of the tournament.

== Teams ==
=== Denmark ===
The Denmark Uber Cup team in 1957.

Six players represented Denmark in the 1957 Uber Cup.

Name	DoB/Age
Tonny Ahm	21 September 1914 (aged 42)
Aase Schiøtt Jacobsen	1925 (aged 31–32)
Tonny Ruth Petersen	25 January 1936 (aged 21)
Birte Kristiansen	1933 (aged 23–24)
Kirsten Granlund	9 April 1928 (aged 28)
Anni Hammergaard Hansen	1930 (aged 26–27)

=== India ===
The India Uber Cup team in 1957.

Five players represented India in the 1957 Uber Cup.

Name	DoB/Age
Mumtaj Lotwalla	1922 (aged 34–35)
Sushila Kapadia	27 September 1932 (aged 24)
Prem Prashar	1931 (aged 25–26)
Suman Athavale	1930 (aged 26–27)
Shashi Bhatt	1930 (aged 26–27)

=== United States ===
The United States Uber Cup team in 1957.

Six players represented the United States in the 1957 Uber Cup.

Name	DoB/Age
Judy Devlin	22 October 1935 (aged 21)
Margaret Varner	4 October 1927 (aged 29)
Lois Alston	1931 (aged 25–26)
Ethel Marshall	6 May 1924 (aged 32)
Bea Massman	24 April 1912 (aged 44)
Susan Devlin	1931 (aged 25–26)
