= List of Denmark Open men's singles champions =

Below is the list of the winners at the Denmark Open in badminton in men's singles.

Year	Champion	Runner-up	Score
1935-1936	(Denmark) Poul Nielsen		
1936-1937	(England) Maurice Field		
1937-1938	(Malaysia) Ong Hock Sim		
1938-1939	(Denmark) Tage Madsen		
1939; 1944	No competition		
1945-1946	(Sweden) Conny Jepsen		
1946-1947	(Denmark) Poul Holm		
1947-1948	(Denmark) Jørn Skaarup		
1948-1949	(United States) David G. Freeman	(Federation of Malaya) Ooi Teik Hock	
1949-1950	(Sweden) Nils Jonson		
1950-1951	(Federation of Malaya) Wong Peng Soon		
1951-1952	(Denmark) Jørn Skaarup		
1952-1953	(Federation of Malaya) Eddy B. Choong		
1953-1954	No competition		
1954-1955	(Denmark) Finn Kobberø		
1955; 1964	No competition		
1965-1966	(Denmark) Svend Andersen		
1966-1967	(Malaysia) Tan Aik Huang		
1967-1968	(Denmark) Erland Kops		
1968-1969	(Denmark) Svend Andersen		
1969-1970	(Japan) Ippei Kojima	(Denmark) Erland Kops	15-3, 15-10
1970-1971	(Indonesia) Rudy Hartono	(Japan) Ippei Kojima	14-18, 15-14, 15-11
1971-1972	(Denmark) Svend Pri		
1972-1973	(Indonesia) Rudy Hartono		
1973-1974	(Denmark) Svend Pri		
1974-1975	(Indonesia) Rudy Hartono		
1975-1976	(Denmark) Svend Pri		
1976-1977	(Denmark) Flemming Delfs		
1977-1978	(Indonesia) Liem Swie King		
1978-1979	(Denmark) Flemming Delfs		
1979-1980	(India) Prakash Padukone		
1980-1981	(Denmark) Morten Frost		
1981-1982	(Denmark) Morten Frost		
1982-1983	(Denmark) Morten Frost		
1983-1984	(Denmark) Morten Frost		
1984-1985	(Denmark) Morten Frost		
1985-1986	(Denmark) Morten Frost		
1986-1987	(Denmark) Morten Frost		
1987-1988	(Denmark) Torben Carlsen		
1988-1989	(Denmark) Poul-Erik Høyer Larsen		
1989-1990	(Denmark) Morten Frost		
1990-1991	(Denmark) Poul-Erik Høyer Larsen	(Denmark) Morten Frost	4-15, 15-10, 17-14
1991-1992	(Indonesia) Hermawan Susanto	(Denmark) Poul-Erik Høyer Larsen	8-15, 15-2, 15-8
1992-1993	(England) Darren Hall	(Denmark) Poul-Erik Høyer Larsen	15-11, 18-13
1993-1994	(Denmark) Poul-Erik Høyer Larsen	(Sweden) Jens Olsson	
1994-1995	(Denmark) Poul-Erik Høyer Larsen	(Indonesia) Alan Budi Kusuma	
1995-1996	(Denmark) Poul-Erik Høyer Larsen	(Indonesia) Hendrawan	17-18, 17-14, 17-16
1996-1997	(Denmark) Thomas Stuer-Lauridsen	(Malaysia) Ong Ewe Hock	
1997-1998	(China) Dong Jiong	(Denmark) Peter Gade	15-17, 15-11, 15-12
1998-1999	(Denmark) Peter Gade	(China) Dong Jiong	15-8, 17-14
2000-2001	(Denmark) Peter Gade	(Sweden) George Rimarcdi	15-11, 15-12
2001-2002	(China) Bao Chunlai	(China) Lin Dan	7-5, 7-1, 7-0
2002-2003	(China) Chen Hong		
2003-2004	(China) Lin Dan		
2004-2005	(China) Lin Dan		
2005-2006	(Malaysia) Lee Chong Wei	(Malaysia) Muhd Hafiz Hashim	17-14, 15-8
2006-2007	(China) Chen Hong	(China) Chen Yu	21-18, 21-18
2007-2008	(China) Lin Dan	(China) Bao Chunlai	21-15, 21-12
2008	(Denmark) Peter Gade	(Denmark) Joachim Persson	21-18, 17-21, 21-14
2009	(Indonesia) Simon Santoso	(Germany) Marc Zwiebler	21-14, 21-6
2010	(Denmark) Jan Ø. Jørgensen	(Indonesia) Taufik Hidayat	21-19, 21-19
2011	(China) Chen Long	(Malaysia) Lee Chong Wei	21-15, 21-18
