= 1950 All England Badminton Championships =

1950 All England Championships
Tournament details
- Dates: 1 March 1950– 4 March 1950
- Edition: 40th
- Venue: Empress Hall, Earls Court
- Location: London

The 1950 All England Championships was a badminton tournament held at the Empress Hall, Earls Court, London, England, from 1–4 March 1950.

== Final results ==
Category	Winners	Runners-up	Score
Men's singles	(Malaysia) Wong Peng Soon	(Denmark) Poul Holm	15–7, 15-10
Women's singles	(Denmark) Tonny Ahm	(Denmark) Aase Schiøtt Jacobsen	11–4, 11–6
Men's doubles	(Denmark) Jørn Skaarup & Preben Dabelsteen	(Denmark) Poul Holm & Børge Frederiksen	9–15, 15–2, 15–12
Women's doubles	(Denmark) Tonny Ahm & Kirsten Thorndahl	(England) Queenie Allen & Betty Uber	16–17, 15–5, 15-8
Mixed doubles	(Denmark) Poul Holm & Tonny Ahm	(Denmark) Jørn Skaarup & Birgit Rostgaard-Frohne	15–3, 15–4

== Men's singles ==
=== Section 1 ===
Round of 32
(Denmark) Poul Holm +	15	15
(England) A L Salway	3	1
(England) Harold Marsland	15	15
(Malaysia) Siow Watt Soon	4	1
(Sweden) Inge Blomberg +	15	15
(England) T H Brown	2	3
(England) J A Broadhurst	w/o
(India) V Chander
(Malaysia) Eddy Choong +	15	15
(England) Tom Wingfield	2	5
(England) W C Regan	15	15
(England) E D T Vane	5	7
(Denmark) Ole Jensen +	15	15
(Denmark) Arve Lossman	9	7
(Denmark) John Nygaard	15	15	15
(England) R Radford	4	18	10

Round of 16
(Denmark) Holm	15	15
(England) Marsland	6	12
(Sweden) Blomberg	15	15
(England) Broadhurst	3	2
(Malaysia) Choong E	15	15
(England) Regan	1	4
(Denmark) Jensen	15	15
(Denmark) Nygaard	6	2

Quarterfinals
(Denmark) Holm	15	15
(Sweden) Blomberg	8	11
(Malaysia) Choong E	15	6	9
(Denmark) Jensen	12	15	15

Semifinals
(Denmark) Holm	18	15
(Denmark) Jensen	14	13

=== Section 2 ===
Round of 32
(Denmark) Jørgen Hammergaard Hansen	15	15
(Scotland) James Mackay	6	4
(Sweden) Olle Wahlberg	15	15
(England) R Mulvaney	8	5
(Sweden) Knut Malmgren	15	15
(Malaysia) L T Lee	6	8
(Denmark) Jørn Skaarup +	15	8	8
(Denmark) Preben Dablelsteen	8	15	0r
(Sweden) Ingemaar Eliasson	15	15
(England) J D Robertson	9	6
(Sweden) Nils Jonson	15	15
(India) Trilok Nath Seth	7	5
(Denmark) Børge Frederiksen	15	15
(England) Warwick Shute	7	5
(Malaysia) Wong Peng Soon +	15	15
(England) J H Kellett	3	1

Round of 16
(Denmark) H-Hansen	15	15
(Sweden) Wahlberg	10	8
(Sweden) Malmgren	2	6
(Denmark) Skaarup	15	15
(Sweden) Eliasson	10	12
(Sweden) Jonson	15	15
(Denmark) Frederiksen	3	8
(Malaysia) Peng Soon	15	15

Quarterfinals
(Denmark) H-Hansen	8	12
(Denmark) Skaarup	15	15
(Sweden) Jonson	6	5
(Malaysia) Peng Soon	15	15

Semifinals
(Denmark) Skaarup	11	15	11
(Malaysia) Peng Soon	15	12	15

+ denotes seed

== Women's singles ==
=== Section 1 ===
First round
(Denmark) Tonny Ahm +	bye
(England) Queenie Allen	bye
(Denmark) Birgit Rostgaard Frohne	bye
(England) K M Henderson	bye
(Denmark) Kirsten Thorndahl +	bye
(England) Audrey Stone	bye
(England) F M Henderson	bye
(England) Audrey Blathwayt	11	11
(England) V E Duringer	8	0

Second round
(Denmark) Ahm	11	11
(England) Allen	4	0
(Denmark) Frohne	11	11
(England) Henderson	4	5
(Denmark) Thorndahl	11	11
(England) Stone	1	1
(England) Henderson	1	11	11
(England) Blathwayt	11	3	7

Quarterfinals
(Denmark) Ahm	11	11
(Denmark) Frohne	3	2
(Denmark) Thorndahl	11	11
(England) Henderson	0	1

Semifinals
(Denmark) Ahm	11	11	11
(Denmark) Thorndahl	5	12	4

=== Section 2 ===
First round
(Denmark) Aase Schiøtt Jacobsen +	bye
(England) C M Robinson	bye
(Scotland) Nancy Horner	bye
(England) Elizabeth O'Beime	bye
(New Zealand) N M Fleming	w/o
(England) L Platt
(England) Betty Uber	bye
(England) M J Barnett	bye
(Denmark) Aase Svendsen	bye

Second round
(Denmark) Jacobsen	11	11
(England) Robinson	1	8
(Scotland) Horner	11	11
(England) O'Beime	7	4
(New Zealand) Fleming	12	4	11
(England) Uber	11	11	7
(England) Barnett	w/o
(Denmark) Svendsen

Quarterfinals
(Denmark) Jacobsen	11	11
(Scotland) Horner	2	6
(New Zealand) Fleming	12	11
(England) Barnett	10	8

Semifinals
(Denmark) Jacobsen	11	11
(New Zealand) Fleming	3	3
