= 1960 All England Badminton Championships =

1960 All England Championships
Tournament details
- Dates: 16 March 1960– 20 March 1960
- Edition: 50th
- Venue: Wembley
- Location: London

The 1960 All England Championships was a badminton tournament held at Wembley, London, England, from 16–20 March 1960.

The ladies champion Heather Ward moved to South Africa and did not defend her title.

== Final results ==
Category	Winners	Runners-up	Score
Men's singles	(Denmark) Erland Kops	(Thailand) Charoen Wattanasin	15-1, 11-15, 15-6
Women's singles	(United States) Judy Devlin	(United States) Margaret Varner	11-1, 11-9
Men's doubles	(Denmark) Finn Kobberø & Poul-Erik Nielsen	(Malaysia) Lim Say Hup & Teh Kew San	14-17, 15-3, 15-11
Women's doubles	(United States) Sue Devlin & Judy Devlin	(Denmark) Kirsten Thorndahl & Inge Birgit Hansen	15-3, 15-6
Mixed doubles	(Denmark) Finn Kobberø & Kirsten Thorndahl	(Denmark) Poul-Erik Nielsen & Inge Birgit Hansen	15-7, 15-2

== Results ==
=== Men's singles ===
==== Section 1 ====
Round of 32
1	(Denmark) Erland Kops	15	15
(Republic of Ireland) James 'Chick' Doyle	3	5
(India) I P S Gill	18	15
(Malaysia) Harry Parmar	16	5
(Malaysia) Teh Kew San +	7	15	15
(Sweden) Goran Wahlqvist	15	2	11
(England) Peter Waddell	15	15
(England) Bill Havers	6	12
(Thailand) Thanoo Khadjadbhye +	15	15
(England) Roger Mills	4	12
(Denmark) Jørgen Hammergaard Hansen	18	15
(England) J Lanning	16	11
(Indonesia) Ferry Sonneville +	9	15	15
(England) Trevor Coates	15	4	7
(Denmark) Knud Aage Nielsen	15	8
(Denmark) Bjorn Holst-Christensen	11	3	ret

Round of 16
1	(Denmark) Kops	15	15
(India) Gill	1	10
(Malaysia) Kew San	15	15
(England) Waddell	5	8
(Thailand) Khadjadbhye	15	15
(Denmark) H-Hansen	10	12
(Indonesia) Sonneville	15	15
(Denmark) Nielsen	9	6

Quarterfinals
1	(Denmark) Kops	15	15
(Malaysia) Kew San	13	9
(Thailand) Khadjadbhye	10	15	18
(Indonesia) Sonneville	15	19	17

Semifinals
1	(Denmark) Kops	15	15
(Thailand) Khadjadbhye	5	3

==== Section 2 ====
Round of 32
2	(Thailand) Charoen Wattanasin	w/o
(India) Chandrakant Deoras
(Malaysia) Ong Chong Jin	15	15
(England) Dick Hashman	4	10
(Denmark) Henning Borch +	15	15
(England) Tony Jordan	1	8
(Malaysia) B K Wong	15	15
(Malaysia) Kean Hua Yeoh	5	12
(Denmark) Finn Kobberø +	15	15
(India) Vikram Bhat	4	8
(Malaysia) Lee Kin Tat	15	15
(Wales) Gordon Rowlands	3	6
(Sweden) Berndt Dahlberg +	15	15
(England) Hugh Findlay	4	8
(England) Colin Beacom	15	15
(England) David Rowe	10	9

Round of 16
2	(Thailand) Wattanasin	15	15
(Malaysia) Chong Jin	9	6
(Denmark) Borch	15	15
(Malaysia) Wong	5	2
(Denmark) Kobbero	15	15
(Malaysia) Kin Tat	2	0
(Sweden) Dahlberg	15	15
(England) Beacon	7	6

Quarterfinals
2	(Thailand) Wattanasin	9	15	15
(Denmark) Borch	15	1	11
(Denmark) Kobbero	15	15
(Sweden) Dahlberg	6	10

Semifinals
2	(Thailand) Wattanasin	15	15
(Denmark) Kobbero	11	8

=== Women's singles ===
==== Section 1 ====
Round of 32
(United States) Judy Devlin +	11	11
(Denmark) Annette Schmidt	4	2
(England) M J Frost	11	12
(India) Mumtaj Chinoy Lotwalla	5	9
(Republic of Ireland) Mary O'Sullivan +	11	11
(New Zealand) Glenys Hopkinson	3	0
(England) B Holborn	0	11	11
(England) Audrey Marshall	11	6	9
(Scotland) Wilma Tyre +	11	11
(New Zealand) Val Gow	6	4
(India) Meena Shah	11	11
(England) Anita Price	6	0
(England) Ursula Smith	7	11	12
(England) S J Baldwin	11	2	10
(United States) Sue Devlin +	11	11
(Denmark) K Jensen	0	1

Round of 16
(United States) Devlin J	11	11
(England) Frost	2	1
(Republic of Ireland) O'Sullivan	11	11
(England) Holborn	1	3
(Scotland) Tyre	11	12
(India) Shah	6	11
(England) Smith	14	11	11
(United States) Devlin S	11	2	2

Quarterfinals
(United States) Devlin J	11	11
(Republic of Ireland) O'Sullivan	1	4
(Scotland) Tyre	11	11
(England) Smith	6	8

Semifinals
(United States) Devlin J	11	11
(Scotland) Tyre	0	1

==== Section 2 ====
Round of 32
(United States) Margaret Varner +	11	11
(England) H C Gunerin	6	0
(England) Sheila Ryder	11	3	11
(Republic of Ireland) Lena Rea	5	11	7
(Denmark) Hanne Jensen	11	11
(Scotland) Catherine Dunglison	4	8
(New Zealand) Sonya Cox +	11	11
(India) Prema Prasher	1	7
(Thailand) Pratuang Pattabongse +	11	11
(England) Angela Bairstow	9	3
(New Zealand) Heather Robson	12	11
(England) Jenny Pritchard	9	1
(Denmark) Tonny Holst-Christensen +	6	11	11
(Republic of Ireland) Yvonne Kelly	11	4	6
(England) Margaret Barrand	12	11
(England) B Bird	10	4

Round of 16
(United States) Varner	11	11
(England) Ryder	7	5
(Denmark) Jensen	11	10	11
(New Zealand) Cox	8	12	5
(Thailand) Pattabongse	12	11
(New Zealand) Robson	10	2
(Denmark) Holst-C	12	11
(England) Barrand	11	7

Quarterfinals
(United States) Varner	11	11
(Denmark) Jensen	2	7
(Thailand) Pattabongse	11	4	11
(Denmark) Holst-C	5	11	6

Semifinals
(United States) Varner	11	11
(Thailand) Pattabongse	2	9

+ seeded player
