= 1956 All England Badminton Championships =

1956 All England Championships
Tournament details
- Dates: 14 March 1956– 17 March 1956
- Edition: 46th
- Venue: Empress Hall, Earls Court
- Location: London

The 1956 All England Championships was a badminton tournament held at the Empress Hall, Earls Court, London, England, from 14 to 17 March 1956.

== Final results ==
Category	Winners	Runners-up	Score
Men's singles	(Malaysia) Eddy Choong	(Denmark) Finn Kobberø	11-15, 15–3, 15-11
Women's singles	(United States) Margaret Varner	(United States) Judy Devlin	11-8, 11-6
Men's doubles	(Denmark) Finn Kobberø & Jørgen Hammergaard Hansen	(Denmark) John Nygaard & Poul-Erik Nielsen	18-14, 15-5
Women's doubles	(United States) Judy Devlin & Sue Devlin	(England) Iris Rogers & June Timperley	17-18, 15–12, 15-12
Mixed doubles	(England) Tony Jordan & June Timperley	(Denmark) Jørgen Hammergaard Hansen & Anni Jorgensen	18-15, 6-15, 15-8

Both June White and Iris Cooley married and competed under their married names of June Timperley and Iris Rogers.

== Results ==
=== Men's singles ===
==== Section 1 ====
Round of 32
(Denmark) Finn Kobberø +	15	15
(England) M Robinson	6	0
(England) John Timperley	15	15
(England) Peter Waddell	3	7
(England) Hugh Findlay	15	15
(Malaysia) Ong Poh Lim +	6	10
(Sweden) Berndt Dahlberg	15	15
(Denmark) John Nygaard	2	4
(Denmark) Erland Olsen	15	15
(Indonesia) Ferry Sonneville +	4	4
(Denmark) Ole Mertz	15	15
(England) R Quiddington	9	1
(Sweden) Bertil Glans +	15	15	17
(England) Jack McColl	10	17	14
(Canada) B Westcott	15	15
(England) C Darnell	5	4

Round of 16
(Denmark) Kobberø	15	15
(England) Timperley	4	6
(England) Findlay	10	4
(Sweden) Dahlberg	15	15
(Denmark) Olsen	18	15	18
(Denmark) Mertz	14	17	14
(Sweden) Glans	14	15	15
(Canada) Westcott	17	12	8

Quarterfinals
(Denmark) Kobberø	15	15
(Sweden) Dahlberg	10	10
(Denmark) Olsen	13	9
(Sweden) Glans	18	15

Semifinals
(Denmark) Kobberø	15	15
(Sweden) Glans	3	5

==== Section 2 ====
Round of 32
(Denmark) Jørgen Hammergaard Hansen	15	3	15
(Denmark) Niels Buchholst	6	15	11
(Sweden) Rune Brinkestedt	18	17
(Canada) Dave McTaggart	15	14
(England) K C Carpenter	16	15	15
(England) J A Broadhurst	17	4	2
(United States) Joe Alston	15	15
(England) Tony Jordan	5	6
(England) H R Holdsworth	w/o
(South Africa) B T Brownlee
(Denmark) Palle Granlund	15	15
(Sweden) Leif Ekedahl +	11	10
(England) G H King	15	17	15
(England) John Best	18	16	12
(Malaysia) Eddy Choong +	15	15
(England) Michael Rawlings	3	1

Round of 16
(Denmark) H-Hansen	15	15
(Sweden) Brinkestedt	5	9
(England) Carpenter
(United States) Alston	w/o
(England) Holdsworth	2	12
(Denmark) Granlund	15	15
(England) King	1	0
(Malaysia) Choong	15	15

Quarterfinals
(Denmark) H-Hansen	11	18	15
(United States) Alston	15	16	12
(Denmark) Granlund	1	7
(Malaysia) Choong	15	15

Semifinals
(Denmark) H-Hansen	3	12
(Malaysia) Choong	15	15

=== Women's singles ===
==== Section 1 ====
Round of 32
(United States) Margaret Varner +	bye
(England) J Waring	bye
(Denmark) Aase Schiøtt Jacobsen	11	10	11
(England) W M Bear	7	12	5
(England) June Timperley	11	11
(Sweden) Berit Olsson	5	7
(United States) Lois Alston	12	11
(England) Audrey Marshall	10	3
(England) Heather Ward +	11	11
(Denmark) Inge Birgit Anker Hansen	2	0
(Scotland) Nancy Horner	11	11
(England) P H Parfitt	5	6
(England) Sylvia Ripley	6	11	1
(England) Barbara Carpenter	11	8

Round of 16
(United States) Varner	11	11
(England) Waring	3	0
(Denmark) Jacobsen	8	11	11
(England) Timperley	11	6	4
(United States) Alston	12	13
(England) Ward	10	12
(Scotland) Horner	11	11
(England) Ripley	8	6

Quarterfinals
(United States) Varner	11	11
(Denmark) Jacobsen	2	1
(United States) Alston	11	11
(Scotland) Horner	2	4

Semifinals
(United States) Varner	11	11
(United States) Alston	6	0

==== Section 2 ====
Round of 32
(United States) Judy Devlin +	bye
(England) Audrey Stone	bye
(Denmark) Birte Kristiansen	3	8
(England) M Warren	11	11
(England) P A Lawrence	11	11
(Sweden) Ingrid Nilsson	6	8
(England) Iris Rogers	11	11
(United States) Sue Devlin	7	1
(Scotland) J M M Smart	11	8	11
(Sweden) Ingrid Dahlberg	4	11	2
(Canada) Marjory Shedd	8
(Denmark) Kirsten Thorndahl	4 ret
(England) B Bird	11	11
(England) P Warner	4	6

Round of 16
(United States) Devlin	11	11
(England) Stone	1	0
(Denmark) Kristiansen	11	12
(England) Lawrence	6	10
(England) Rogers	11	11
(Scotland) Smart	5	1
(Canada) Shedd	11	11
(England) Bird	3	2

Quarterfinals
(United States) Devlin	11	11
(Denmark) Kristiansen	5	2
(England) Rogers	11	11	11
(Canada) Shedd	7	12	7

Semifinals
(United States) Devlin	4	11	11
(England) Rogers	11	7	5
