= 1962 Irish Badminton Close =

1962 Irish Close Badminton Championships
Tournament details
- Dates: 7 December 1962– 8 December 1962
- Venue: Midland Branch Hall, Whitehall Road, Terenure
- Location: Dublin, Ireland

The 1962 Irish Close Badminton Championships was a national closed badminton tournament held in the Midland Branch Hall, Whitehall Road, Terenure, Dublin, Ireland from 7 to 8 December 1962.

== Final results ==
Category	Winners	Runners-up
Men's singles	R. Harris	D. McCullough
Women's singles	M. O'Sullivan	Y.W. Kelly
Men's doubles	J.P. Doyle; C.W. Wilkinson	K. Carlisle; S. Blair
Women's doubles	M. O'Sullivan; Y.W. Kelly	L. McAleese; S. Peard
Mixed doubles	C.W. Wilkinson; Y.W. Kelly	S. Blair; M. O'Sullivan
