= Dorothy O'Neil =

American badminton player (1930–2024)

- O'Neil in 1963

Personal information
- Born: September 4, 1930 Norwich, Connecticut, U.S.
- Died: April 4, 2024 (aged 93)

Sport
- Country: United States
- Sport: Badminton
Medal record
Women's badminton
Representing United States
Uber Cup
Gold medal – first place	1960 Philadelphia	Women's team
Gold medal – first place	1963 Wilmington	Women's team

Dorothy "Dottie" O'Neil (September 5, 1930 – April 4, 2024) was an American badminton player.

== Playing History ==
O'Neil won women's singles titles at numerous tournaments including the Mason-Dixon, Mid-Atlantic, New England, and Connecticut Opens from the late 1950s through the late 1960s. She won the US Open women's singles title in 1964 after having reached the finals of the event several times previously. She was ranked second in the United States six times behind the world's dominant women's player of the era Judy Devlin Hashman, and was repeatedly ranked in the top three nationally in women's doubles. She co-ranked first with partner Rosine Lemon in 1972.

In international events, O'Neil won the Mexican Open Singles in 1965 and competed for the United States in the World Team Championships for Women, also known as the Uber Cup, including the World Champion US teams of 1960 and 1963. She also played on the 1969 Uber Cup team and was captain of the team in 1972.

In 1994 O'Neil was inducted into the USA Badminton Hall of Fame.

O'Neil died on April 4, 2024, at the age of 93.

== Achievements ==
=== International tournaments ===
Women's singles
Year	Tournament	Opponent	Score	Result
1958	U.S. Open	(United States) Judy Devlin	2–11, 2–11	(silver) Runner-up
1959	U.S. Open	(United States) Judy Devlin	0–11, 1–11	(silver) Runner-up
1964	U.S. Open	(United States) Tyna Barinaga	12–11, 11–2	(gold) Winner
1965	U.S. Open	(United States) Judy Hashman	3–11, 0–11	(silver) Runner-up
1965	Mexico International	(United States) Janice DeZort	12–10, 11–6	(gold) Winner
1968	U.S. Open	(United States) Tyna Barinaga	2–11, 6–11	(silver) Runner-up

Women's doubles
Year	Tournament	Partner	Opponent	Score	Result
1957	U.S. Open	(United States) Margaret Varner	(United States) Judy Devlin (United States) Susan Devlin	15–7, 7–15, 5–15	(silver) Runner-up
1960	U.S. Open	(United States) Margaret Varner	(United States) Judy Devlin (United States) Susan Devlin	13–15, 4–15	(silver) Runner-up
1971	U.S. Open	(United States) Ethel Marshall	(Japan) Noriko Takagi (Japan) Hiroe Yuki	8–15, 2–15	(silver) Runner-up
