= Margaret Varner Bloss =

American athlete and academic (born 1927)

Personal information
- Born: Margaret Varner; 4 October 1927 (age 99) El Paso, Texas, U.S.

Sport
- Country: United States
- Sport: Badminton
Medal record
Women's badminton
Representing United States
Uber Cup
Gold medal – first place	1957 Lancashire	Women's team
Gold medal – first place	1960 Philadelphia	Women's team

Margaret Varner Bloss (born October 4, 1927) is an American retired athlete and a professor of physical education from El Paso, Texas who excelled in three distinctly different racket sports: badminton, squash, and tennis.

Varner Bloss is the only person to have represented the US at the highest level of international competition in all three sports, and is the only person to have won the U.S. national singles championships of both badminton and squash or to have been inducted into the respective U.S. halls of fame of both sports.

== Badminton career ==
Varner's most impressive accomplishments came in badminton, which she took up at Texas Woman's University in the late 1940s, having gained prominence in junior and collegiate tennis. In 1955 and 1956, she won consecutive women's singles titles at the All-England Championships, then the world's most prestigious badminton tournament for individual players.

She was a runner-up in the All England singles in 1957, 1958 and 1960, and shared the doubles title in 1958. The fact that she won only one U.S. Singles title in badminton (1955) is largely attributable to the presence of two formidable contemporaries: Ethel Marshall and Judy Devlin Hashman. Along with Varner, they formed a kind of "great triumvirate" of American women's badminton.

Varner was a member of the world champion U.S. Uber Cup (Women's International Badminton) teams of 1957 and 1960. After helping to secure victory in the second of these triennial events, she retired from badminton competition. She was inducted into the U.S. Badminton Hall of Fame (now called the Walk of Fame) in 1965 and the World Badminton Hall of Fame in 1999.

=== International tournaments ===
Women's singles
Year	Tournament	Opponent	Score	Result
1954	U.S. Open	(United States) Judy Devlin	11–8, 6–11, 6–11	(silver) Runner-up
1955	All England Open	(United States) Judy Devlin	9–11, 11–5, 11–1	(gold) Winner
1955	U.S. Open	(United States) Judy Devlin	6–11, 12–9, 12–9	(gold) Winner
1956	All England Open	(United States) Judy Devlin	11–8, 11–6	(gold) Winner
1956	U.S. Open	(United States) Judy Devlin	10–12, 6–11	(silver) Runner-up
1957	All England Open	(United States) Judy Devlin	2–11, 7–11	(silver) Runner-up
1957	U.S. Open	(United States) Judy Devlin	2–11, 0–11	(silver) Runner-up
1958	All England Open	(United States) Judy Devlin	7–11, 10–12	(silver) Runner-up
1960	All England Open	(United States) Judy Devlin	1–11, 9–11	(silver) Runner-up
1960	U.S. Open	(United States) Judy Devlin	11–6, 7–11, 7–11	(silver) Runner-up

Women's doubles
Year	Tournament	Partner	Opponent	Score	Result
1957	U.S. Open	(United States) Dorothy O'Neil	(United States) Judy Devlin (United States) Susan Devlin	15–7, 7–15, 5–15	(silver) Runner-up
1958	All England Open	(England) Heather Ward	(England) Iris Rogers (England) June Timperley	15–12, 15–2	(gold) Winner
1960	U.S. Open	(United States) Dorothy O'Neil	(United States) Judy Devlin (United States) Susan Devlin	13–15, 4–15	(silver) Runner-up

Mixed doubles
Year	Tournament	Partner	Opponent	Score	Result
1960	U.S. Open	(Denmark) Finn Kobberø	(United States) Michael Roche (United States) Judy Devlin	15–7, 15–2	(gold) Winner

== Squash career ==
Before her badminton career ended, Varner started to make her mark in squash by reaching the singles final of the U.S. championships in 1959. In 1960, she won the first of four consecutive national squash titles. She represented the U.S. against Great Britain in the Wolfe-Noel Cup matches (1959, 1963), and Philadelphia for five straight years in the Howe Cup. In 2000, she was inducted into the U.S. Squash Rackets Association Hall of Fame.

== Tennis career ==
Varner's early racket sport triumphs came in tennis with victories in National Junior Girls Doubles (1944 and 1945) and in numerous Texas state and regional events. She eventually played the circuit of national and international tournaments which, in this amateur-only era, were generally held in the six-month span alternating with that of most badminton and squash tournaments.

Although she never reached the relative heights in tennis that she did in badminton and squash, she was a strong enough player to reach the final of Wimbledon women's doubles in 1958, losing to Althea Gibson and Maria Bueno. Her Wimbledon partner that year was Margaret Osborne duPont with whom she formed a friendship that became a life partnership following duPont's divorce. In 1961 and 1962, the duPont-Varner partnership won doubles matches for U.S. Wightman Cup teams that defeated Great Britain.

== Horse breeding ==
After her career in racket sports ended, Varner gradually immersed herself in a different kind of sports venture. Her marriage to horse trainer Gerald Bloss in the late 1960s produced a son, Leigh (born 1971). It also piqued Varner's interest in the breeding and training of thoroughbred racehorses.

After her husband's death, she pursued this interest seriously with her life partner Margaret Osborne duPont. They formed the duPont-Bloss Stables near El Paso and often gave their horses names taken from the argot of tennis and other racket sports. In 1996, they were ranked as Top Twenty Racehorse Owners by Thoroughbred Times.

== Other ==
Varner Bloss was inducted into the Delaware Sports Hall of Fame in 2019.
