= 1948 All England Badminton Championships =

1948 All England Championships
Tournament details
- Dates: 3 March 1948– 6 March 1948
- Edition: 38th
- Venue: Harringay Arena
- Location: London

The 1948 All England Championships was a badminton tournament held at the Harringay Arena, London, England, from 3–6 March 1948.

== Final results ==
Category	Winners	Runners-up	Score
Men's singles	(Denmark) Jørn Skaarup	(Denmark) Poul Holm	15–3, 15–13
Women's singles	(Denmark) Kirsten Thorndahl	(Denmark) Tonny Ahm	11–7, 11–0
Men's doubles	(Denmark) Preben Dabelsteen & Børge Frederiksen	(Sweden) Conny Jepsen & Nils Jonson	15-8, 16-18, 18-17
Women's doubles	(Denmark) Tonny Ahm & Kirsten Thorndahl	(England) Betty Uber & Queenie Allen	15–6, 12-15, 15–2
Mixed doubles	(Denmark) Jørn Skaarup & Kirsten Thorndahl	(Sweden) Conny Jepsen & (Denmark) Aase Svendsen	15-10, 15-2

Tonny Olsen married and changed her name to Tonny Ahm.

== Men's singles ==
Second round
(Denmark) Jørn Skaarup	15	15
(England) Warwick Shute	9	0
(England) Tom Wingfield	15	15
(England) T Kennedy	5	1
(Sweden) Conny Jepsen	15	15
(Denmark) Preben Dabelsteen	7	9
(England) Harold Marsland	15	15
(England) L E Ward	7	9
(Denmark) Poul Holm	15	15
(England) Peter Birtwhistle	4	7
(Sweden) Nils Jonson	15	15
(England) N L Williams	9	12
(Denmark) Børge Frederiksen	15	15
(Republic of Ireland) Frank Peard	9	4
(England) Noel Radford	9	15	15
(Denmark) Jørgen Hammergaard Hansen	15	11	5

Quarterfinals
(Denmark) Skaarup	15	17
(England) Wingfield	5	14
(Sweden) Jepsen	15	15
(England) Marsland	5	4
(Denmark) Holm	5	15	15
(Sweden) Jonson	15	5	4
(Denmark) Frederiksen	15	15
(England) Radford	7	10

Semifinals
(Denmark) Skaaarup	15	15
(Sweden) Jepsen	10	7
(Denmark) Holm	14	15	15
(Denmark) Frederiksen	18	10	4

Final
(Denmark) Skaarup	15	15
(Denmark) Holm	3	13

== Women's singles ==
Second round
(Denmark) Kirsten Thorndahl	11	11
(England) A Y Richardson	5	0
(England) Evelyn Windsor-Aubrey	11	11
(England) Audrey Stone	4	9
(Denmark) Marie Ussing	11	11
(England) M J Barnett	3	7
(England) Queenie Allen	11	11
(England) Madge Alcorn	0	7
(Denmark) Tonny Ahm	11	11
(England) Audrey Blathwayt	1	4
(Denmark) Agnete Friis	11	11
(England) P Askew	0	0
(Denmark) Aase Svendsen	11	11
(England) Betty Uber	0	0
(England) K N Henderson	4	12	11
(Scotland) Nancy Horner	11	10	1

Quarterfinals
(Denmark) Thorndahl	11	11
(England) Windsor-Aubrey	0	3
(Denmark) Ussing	11	11
(England) Allen	1	5
(Denmark) Ahm	7	11	3
(Denmark) Friis	11	6	10 ret
(Denmark) Svendsen	11	11
(England) Henderson	6	2

Semifinals
(Denmark) Thorndahl	11	11
(Denmark) Ussing	7	3
(Denmark) Ahm	11	3	12
(Denmark) Svendsen	8	11	9

Final
(Denmark) Thorndahl	11	11
(Denmark) Ahm	7	0
