= 1959 All England Badminton Championships =

1959 All England Championships
Tournament details
- Dates: 18 March 1959– 21 March 1959
- Edition: 49th
- Venue: Wembley
- Location: London

The 1959 All England Championships was a badminton tournament held at Wembley, London, England, from 18 to 21 March 1959.

== Final results ==
| Category | Winners | Runners-up | Score |
|---|---|---|---|
| Men's singles | (Indonesia) Tan Joe Hok | (Indonesia) Ferry Sonneville | 15-8, 10–15, 15-3 |
| Women's singles | (England) Heather Ward | (United States) Judy Devlin | 11-7, 3–11, 11-4 |
| Men's doubles | (Malaysia) Lim Say Hup & Teh Kew San | (Denmark) Henning Borch & Jørgen Hammergaard Hansen | 15-2, 15-10 |
| Women's doubles | (England) Iris Rogers & June Timperley | (United States) Judy Devlin & Sue Devlin | 11-15, 15–10, 15-11 |
| Mixed doubles | (Denmark) Poul-Erik Nielsen & Inge Birgit Hansen | (Denmark) Jørgen Hammergaard Hansen & Kirsten Granlund | 14-17, 15–7, 15-3 |

== Results ==
=== Men's singles ===
==== Section 1 ====
Round of 32
1 | (Indonesia) Tan Joe Hok | 15 | 15
(Sweden) Rune Brinkstedt | 11 | 5
(England) Hugh Findlay | 15 | 15
(Malaysia) Harry Parmar | 6 | 9
(Thailand) Thanoo Khadjadbhye + | w/o
(Sweden) Ingemaar Eliasson
(Denmark) Henning Borch | 15 | 15
(Malaysia) Lee Kin Tat | 7 | 7
4 | (Denmark) Knud Aage Nielsen | 18 | 15
(England) C A Darnell | 13 | 0
(India) I P S Gill | 15 | 16 | 15
(Malaysia) Lim Say Hup | 6 | 18 | 11
(Sweden) Berndt Dahlberg | 15 | 15
(England) Roger Mills | 5 | 8
(England) Peter Waddell | 15 | 15
(England) P Mulvaney | 8 | 7

Round of 16
1 | (Indonesia) Hok | 15 | 15
(England) Findlay | 1 | 2
(Thailand) Khadjadbhye | 15 | 12 | 15
(Denmark) Borch | 6 | 15 | 9
4 | (Denmark) Nielsen | 15 | 15
(India) Gill | 6 | 10
(Sweden) Dahlberg | 15 | 15
(England) Waddell | 6 | 8

Quarterfinals
1 | (Indonesia) Hok | 15 | 12 | 15
(Thailand) Khadjadbhye | 9 | 15 | 8
4 | (Denmark) Nielsen | 15 | 15
(Sweden) Dahlberg | 12 | 13

Semifinals
1 | (Indonesia) Hok | 15 | 17
4 | (Denmark) Nielsen | 11 | 14

===== Section 2 =====
Round of 32
2 | (Indonesia) Ferry Sonneville | 17 | 15
(Sweden) Goran Wahlqvist | 14 | 1
(England) William Havers | 15 | 15
(England) F G White | 4 | 9
(Malaysia) Teh Kew San + | 15 | 17
(England) Tony Jordan | 8 | 16
(Denmark) Poul-Erik Nielsen | 15 | 15
(England) S C Woodley | 10 | 7
3 | (Thailand) Charoen Wattanasin | 15 | 15
(Wales) Gordon Rowlands | 1 | 4
(Scotland) Bob McCoig | 15 | 15
(England) R Quiddington | 7 | 8
(Malaysia) Oon Chong Teik | 15 | 15
(Sweden) Bo Nilsson + | 12 | 12
(England) Trevor Coates | 15 | 15
(England) Kenneth Derrick | 6 | 11

Round of 16
2 | (Indonesia) Sonneville | 15 | 15
(England) Havers | 1 | 3
(Malaysia) Kew San | 11 | 15
(Denmark) Nielsen P.E | 15 | 12 | ret
3 | (Thailand) Wattanasin | 15 | 15
(Scotland) McCoig | 2 | 2
(Malaysia) Teik | 18 | 15
(England) Coates | 16 | 2

Quarterfinals
2 | (Indonesia) Sonneville | 15 | 18
(Malaysia) Kew San | 5 | 16
3 | (Thailand) Wattanasin | 15 | 15
(Malaysia) Teik | 3 | 9

Semifinals
2 | (Indonesia) Sonneville | 15 | 15
3 | (Thailand) Wattanasin | 4 | 3

=== Women's singles ===
==== Section 1 ====
Round of 32
(England) Heather Ward +
(England) M E Govett
(Republic of Ireland) Mary O'Sullivan | 11 | 11
(Denmark) Kirsten Granlund | 5 | 8
(Denmark) Inge Birgit Hansen | 11 | 11
(England) W Bean | 9 | 4
(United States) Sue Devlin | 11 | 11
(England) P E Broad | 5 | 1
(Denmark) Tonny Holst-Christensen | 11 | 11
(England) P Warner | 3 | 3
(Thailand) Pratuang Pattabongse + | 11 | 11
(England) Jenny Pritchard | 4 | 0
(England) M K Frost | 11 | 11
(Republic of Ireland) Gladys Massie | 6 | 4

Round of 16
(England) Ward | 11 | 11
(England) Govett | 1 | 0
(Republic of Ireland) O'Sullivan | 11 | 11
(Denmark) Hansen | 4 | 1
(United States) Devlin S | 8 | 11 | 11
(Denmark) Holst-C | 11 | 5 | 8
(Thailand) Pattabongse | 12 | 11
(England) Frost | 10 | 5

Quarterfinals
(England) Ward | 11 | 11
(Republic of Ireland) O'Sullivan | 3 | 5
(United States) Devlin S | 11 | 12
(Thailand) Pattabongse | 7 | 10

Semifinals
(England) Ward | 11 | 11
(United States) Devlin S | 3 | 2

==== Section 2 ====
Round of 32
(United States) Judy Devlin +
(England) Eileen Pattison
(Denmark) Hanne Jensen | 11 | 11
(England) B Holborn | 4 | 7
(England) A H Larman | w/o
(England) June Timperley
(England) Iris Rogers | 11 | 11
(England) Rita Rabey | 5 | 1
(Republic of Ireland) Yvonne Kelly | 7 | 11 | 11
(England) S J Baldwin | 11 | 3 | 1
(Denmark) Inger Kjaergaard + | 11 | 11
(England) Audrey Marshall | 7 | 5
(England) Barbara Carpenter | 11 | 11
(England) J E Childs | 4 | 8

Round of 16
(United States) Devlin J | 11 | 11
(England) Pattison | 0 | 0
(Denmark) Jensen | 11 | 11
(England) Larman | 3 | 6
(England) Rogers | 11 | 11
(Republic of Ireland) Kelly | 1 | 2
(Denmark) Kjaergaard | 10 | 11 | 11
(England) Carpenter | 12 | 9 | 4

Quarterfinals
(United States) Devlin J | 11 | 11
(Denmark) Jensen | 0 | 2
(England) Rogers | 3 | 12 | 11
(Denmark) Kjaergaard | 11 | 10 | 3

Semifinals
(United States) Devlin J | 11 | 11
(England) Rogers | 3 | 4

+Denotes seed
