= 1957 All England Badminton Championships =

1957 All England Championships
Tournament details
- Dates: 20 March 1957– 25 March 1957
- Edition: 47th
- Venue: Wembley
- Location: London

The 1957 All England Championships was a badminton tournament held at Wembley, London, England, from 20–25 March 1957.

This was the first year in which the competition switched to Wembley from Earls Court. Kirsten Thorndahl married and played under the name Kirsten Granlund.

== Final results ==
Category	Winners	Runners-up	Score
Men's singles	(Malaysia) Eddy Choong	(Denmark) Erland Kops	15-9, 15-3
Women's singles	(United States) Judy Devlin	(United States) Margaret Varner	11-2, 11-7
Men's doubles	(United States) Joe Alston & (Malaysia) Johnny Heah	(Malaysia) Eddy Choong & David Ewe Choong	15-10, 16-17, 15-5
Women's doubles	(Denmark) Anni Hammergaard Hansen & Kirsten Granlund	(England) Iris Rogers & June Timperley	7-15, 15-11, 15-10
Mixed doubles	(Denmark) Finn Kobberø & Kirsten Granlund	(Denmark) Jørgen Hammergaard Hansen & Anni Hammergaard Hansen	15-3, 15-6

== Results ==
=== Men's singles ===
==== Section 1 ====
Round of 32
1	(Malaysia) Eddy Choong	15	15
(England) A Leagas	2	5
(England) K C Carpenter	12	15	15
(England) F C Jones	15	8	13
(Denmark) Jørgen Hammergaard Hansen	15	12	18
(England) Tony Jordan	11	15	13
(England) R Mulvaney	15	15
(England) J A Broadhurst	12	9
(United States) Joe Alston	15	15
(England) R Quiddington	6	4
(Canada) Peter Ferguson	15	15
(England) C E Lawrence	7	3
(Denmark) Palle Granlund	6	15	15
(Denmark) Bjorn Holst-Christensen	15	8	6
(England) John Timperley	2	15	15
(England) W Goode	15	1	5

Round of 16
1	(Malaysia) Choong	15	15
(England) Carpenter	3	2
(Denmark) H-Hansen	15	16	15
(England) Mulvaney	2	18	11
(United States) Alston	15	15
(Canada) Ferguson	11	3
(Denmark) Granlund	15	15
(England) Timperley	10	13

Quarterfinals
1	(Malaysia) Choong	15	15
(Denmark) H-Hansen	12	4
(United States) Alston	18	14	15
(Denmark) Granlund	16	17	4

Semifinals
1	(Malaysia) Choong	15	9	18
(United States) Alston	11	15	16

==== Section 2 ====
Round of 32
(Denmark) Erland Kops	5	15	15
(Indonesia) Ferry Sonneville	15	11	11
(England) Dick Hashman	15
(England) Noel Radford	3	ret
(Malaysia) Oon Chong Teik	15	15
(Denmark) Knud Aage Nielsen	12	5
(Malaysia) Harry Parmar	15	9	15
(England) J H King	9	15	7
2	(Denmark) Finn Kobberø	15	18
(England) Jack McColl	12	16
(England) Ciro Ciniglio	15	0	15
(England) R J Southwell	9	15	9
(Canada) Dave McTaggart	15	15
(England) M Tranter	1	3
(Denmark) Ole Mertz	15	15
(England) Ken Stott	2	8

Round of 16
(Denmark) Kops	15	15
(England) Hashman	4	5
(Malaysia) Teik	15	15
(Malaysia) Parmar	7	5
2	(Denmark) Kobberø	15	15
(England) Ciniglio	0	7
(Canada) McTaggart	15	15
(Denmark) Mertz	4	10

Quarterfinals
(Denmark) Kops	15	15
(Malaysia) Teik	12	12
2	(Denmark) Kobberø	15	15
(Canada) McTaggart	13	8

Semifinals
(Denmark) Kops	11	15	15
2	(Denmark) Kobberø	15	10	13

=== Women's singles ===
==== Section 1 ====
Round of 32
(United States) Judy Devlin
(England) Sylvia Ripley
(Denmark) Aase Schiøtt Jacobsen
(India) Prem Prasher
(United States) Lois Alston
(England) Heather Ward
(Denmark) Tonny Petersen
(England) Eileen Pattison

Round of 16
(United States) Devlin	11	11
(England) Ripley	3	7
(Denmark) Jacobsen	11	11
(India) Prasher	2	1
(United States) Alston	8	11	12
(England) Ward	11	9	10
(Denmark) Petersen	11	11
(England) Pattison	5	7

Quarterfinals
(United States) Devlin	11	11
(Denmark) Jacobsen	0	0
(United States) Alston	11	12	11
(Denmark) Petersen	12	11	8

Semifinals
(United States) Devlin
(United States) Alston

==== Section 2 ====
Round of 32
(United States) Margaret Varner
(England) June Wheating
(England) Iris Rogers
(India) Sushila Kapadia
(Canada) Marjory Shedd
(England) Sheila Ryder
(Denmark) Tonny Ahm
(England) June Timperley

Round of 16
(United States) Varner	11	11
(England) Wheating	2	0
(England) Rogers	11	11
(India) Kapadia	1	7
(Canada) Shedd	9	11	11
(England) Ryder	11	6	3
(Denmark) Ahm	12	11
(England) Timperley	10	8

Quarterfinals
(United States) Varner	5	11	11
(England) Rogers	11	3	2
(Canada) Shedd	11	11
(Denmark) Ahm	1	6

Semifinals
(United States) Varner
(Canada) Shedd
