= Poul-Erik Nielsen =

Danish badminton player (1932–2023)

Personal information
- Born: 10 April 1931
- Died: 14 January 2023 (aged 91)

Sport
- Country: Denmark
- Sport: Badminton
- Handedness: Left

Poul-Erik Nielsen (10 April 1931 – 14 January 2023) was a Danish badminton player. He was a doubles specialist winning three All England titles with partners Erland Kops, Finn Kobberø and Inge Birgit Hansen and reached five more finals. He has four National titles to his name and was capped 33 times by Denmark from 1954 to 1964. He was the elder brother of Knud Aage Nielsen another notable badminton player.

== IBF Presidency and contributions ==
After retiring from the sports, Poul-Erik worked in Danish Ministry of Taxation before returning to badminton with his administrative skills. Poul-Erik was a brilliant innovator with several breakthrough contributions towards badminton such as:

- Created the Rules and Laws committee in 1976 which in turn, expanded the sports professionals' levels and enabled the players to gain more money from prizes and so on.
- Generated mediating ideas and factors onto the president and vice-president at that time, Stellan Mohlin and Craig Reedie during the separations of IBF and World Badminton Federation (WBF) in between 1976-1981 which eventually lead to the unification of both organizations in with the signing of the Deed of Renunciation on 26 May 1981 in Tokyo between the IBF and the World Badminton Federation.
- The unification promoted him as vice-president which he intensely campaigned the badminton for Olympics by hosting the 1983 IBF World Championships in Copenhagen and did it excellently to appeal the crowd and organizers.
- Promoted as the IBF Presidents from 1984 until 1986 where he received the Olympic flag when badminton is confirmed will be held in 1992 Olympics in Barcelona, Spain.

After retiring from IBF duties, Poul-Erik back to Badminton Denmark as a chairman for Committee of Rights of Appeal, a committee to handle quarrels between the Association and clubs, or between clubs or between players and clubs until 1998.

== Death ==
On 14th January 2023, Poul-Erik died at 91 after battling short illnesses.

== Achievements ==
=== International tournaments (15 titles, 14 runners-up) ===
Men's singles
Year	Tournament	Opponent	Score	Result
1964	Swedish Open	(Denmark) Erland Kops	6–15, 14–17	(silver) Runner-up

Men's doubles
Year	Tournament	Partner	Opponent	Score	Result
1956	All England	(Denmark) John Nygaard	(Denmark) Finn Kobberø (Denmark) Jørgen Hammergaard Hansen	14–18, 5–15	(silver) Runner-up
1956	Swedish Open	(Denmark) John Nygaard	(Sweden) Berndt Dahlberg (Sweden) Bertil Glans	14–17, 15–5, 11–15	(silver) Runner-up
1956	Denmark Open	(Denmark) John Nygaard	(Denmark) Finn Kobberø (Denmark) Jørgen Hammergaard Hansen	15–7, 8–15, 14–17	(silver) Runner-up
1958	All England	(Denmark) Erland Kops	(Denmark) Finn Kobberø (Denmark) Jørgen Hammergaard Hansen	15–7, 11–15, 15–8	(gold) Winner
1958	Swedish Open	(Denmark) Ole Mertz	(Denmark) Finn Kobberø (Denmark) Jørgen Hammergaard Hansen	12–15, 15–6, 15–13	(gold) Winner
1959	German Open	(Denmark) Jesper Sandvad	(Sweden) Ingemar Eliasson (Sweden) Bertil Glans	15–13, 15–8	(gold) Winner
1960	All England	(Denmark) Finn Kobberø	(Malaysia) Lim Say Hup (Malaysia) Teh Kew San	14–17, 15–3, 15–11	(gold) Winner
1960	Swedish Open	(Denmark) Finn Kobberø	(Sweden) Berndt Dahlberg (Sweden) Bertil Glans	15–4, 15–4	(gold) Winner
1961	All England	(Denmark) Erland Kops	(Denmark) Finn Kobberø (Denmark) Jørgen Hammergaard Hansen	6–15, 3–15	(silver) Runner-up
1962	German Open	(Denmark) Erland Kops	(Denmark) Finn Kobberø (Denmark) Jørgen Hammergaard Hansen	7–15, 13–15	(silver) Runner-up
1962	Nordic Championships	(Denmark) Knud Aage Nielsen	(Sweden) Bertil Glans (Sweden) Göran Wahlqvist	15–3, 14–17, 16–17	(silver) Runner-up
1963	German Open	(Denmark) Erland Kops	(Denmark) Henning Borch (Denmark) Jørgen Mortensen	15–5, 15–3	(gold) Winner
1963	Swedish Open	(Denmark) Erland Kops	(Denmark) Henning Borch (Denmark) Knud Aage Nielsen	11–15, 9–15	(silver) Runner-up
1964	German Open	(Denmark) Erland Kops	(Denmark) Finn Kobberø (Denmark) Jørgen Hammergaard Hansen	15–3, 15–6	(gold) Winner
1964	All England	(Denmark) Erland Kops	(Denmark) Finn Kobberø (Denmark) Jørgen Hammergaard Hansen	6–15, 3–15	(silver) Runner-up
1964	Swedish Open	(Denmark) Erland Kops	(Denmark) Finn Kobberø (Denmark) Jørgen Hammergaard Hansen	7–15, 14–17	(silver) Runner-up
1966	German Open	(Denmark) Per Walsøe	(England) Tony Jordan (England) David Horton	15–4, 15–5	(gold) Winner
1968	Swedish Open	(Denmark) Per Walsøe	(Denmark) Henning Borch (Denmark) Erland Kops	7–15, 11–15	(silver) Runner-up

Mixed doubles
Year	Tournament	Partner	Opponent	Score	Result
1956	Swedish Open	(Denmark) Kirsten Thorndahl	(Denmark) Jørgen Hammergaard Hansen (Denmark) Anni Hammergaard Hansen	15–4, 11–15, 10–15	(silver) Runner-up
1959	German Open	(Denmark) Agnete Friis	(Denmark) Arne Rasmussen (Denmark) Aase Schiøtt Jacobsen	6–15, 15–13, 15–13	(gold) Winner
1959	All England	(Denmark) Inge Birgit Hansen	(Denmark) Jørgen Hammergaard Hansen (Denmark) Kirsten Granlund	14–17, 15–7, 15–3	(gold) Winner
1960	All England	(Denmark) Inge Birgit Hansen	(Denmark) Finn Kobberø (Denmark) Kirsten Granlund	7–15, 2–15	(silver) Runner-up
1960	Swedish Open	(Sweden) Bodil Sterner	(Sweden) Berndt Dahlberg (Sweden) Ingrid Dahlberg	15–9, 15–12	(gold) Winner
1962	All England	(Denmark) Inge Birgit Hansen	(Denmark) Finn Kobberø (Denmark) Ulla Rasmussen	1–15, 11–15	(silver) Runner-up
1962	Nordic Championships	(Denmark) Ulla Rasmussen	(Sweden) Bertil Glans (Sweden) Gunilla Dahlström	15–10, 15–14	(gold) Winner
1963	German Open	(Denmark) Kirsten Granlund	(Indonesia) Ferry Sonneville (Indonesia) Yvonne Theresia Sonneville	15–4, 17–14	(gold) Winner
1963	Swedish Open	(Denmark) Ulla Rasmussen	(England) Tony Jordan (England) June Timperley	9–15, 15–3, 15–4	(gold) Winner
1968	Nordic Championships	(Denmark) Pernille Mølgaard Hansen	(Denmark) Elo Hansen (Denmark) Karin Jørgensen	15–10, 7–15, 15–9	(gold) Winner
