= Inge Birgit Hansen =

Danish badminton player

Personal information
- Born: 1927
- Died: 20 November 2009 (aged 81–82)

Sport
- Country: Denmark
- Sport: Badminton

Inge Birgit Anker Hansen is a Danish former badminton player. With her mixed doubles partners Finn Kobberø and Poul-Erik Nielsen she won the National title in 1954, 1959 & 1961. In addition Inge won the women's doubles in 1956 & 1960 with Aase Winther. Her greatest success came during the 1959 All England Badminton Championships when she won the mixed doubles with Nielsen.

== Achievements ==
=== International tournaments ===
Women's doubles
| Year | Tournament | Partner | Opponent | Score | Result |
|---|---|---|---|---|---|
| 1949 | Denmark Open | (Denmark) Aase Svendsen | (Denmark) Tonny Ahm (Denmark) Kirsten Thorndahl | 8–15, 1–15 | (silver) Runner-up |
| 1960 | All England | (Denmark) Kirsten Thorndahl | (United States) Judy Devlin (United States) Susan Devlin | 3–15, 6–15 | (silver) Runner-up |

Mixed doubles
| Year | Tournament | Partner | Opponent | Score | Result |
|---|---|---|---|---|---|
| 1954 | All England | (Denmark) Finn Kobberø | (England) John Best (England) Iris Cooley | 12–15, 0–15 | (silver) Runner-up |
| 1956 | Denmark Open | (Denmark) Finn Kobberø | (Denmark) Jørn Skaarup (Denmark) Anni Hammergaard Hansen | 15–9, 7–15, 7–15 | (silver) Runner-up |
| 1959 | All England | (Denmark) Poul-Erik Nielsen | (Denmark) Jørgen Hammergaard Hansen (Denmark) Kirsten Granlund | 14–17, 15–7, 15–3 | (gold) Winner |
| 1960 | All England | (Denmark) Poul-Erik Nielsen | (Denmark) Finn Kobberø (Denmark) Kirsten Granlund | 7–15, 2–15 | (silver) Runner-up |
| 1962 | All England | (Denmark) Poul-Erik Nielsen | (Denmark) Finn Kobberø (Denmark) Ulla Rasmussen | 1–15, 11–15 | (silver) Runner-up |
