= Aase Winther =

Danish badminton player

Personal information
- Born: Aase Svendsen; 1939 (age 86–87)

Sport
- Country: Denmark
- Sport: Badminton
Medal record
Women's badminton
Representing Denmark
Uber Cup
Silver medal – second place	1960 Philadelphia	Women's team

Aase Winther (née Aase Svendsen) is a Danish former badminton player.

== Career ==
Aase Winther won the Women's Doubles title at the Danish national championships four times. Her partners were Kirsten Thorndahl in 1949, Anni Jorgensen in 1955 and Inge Birgit Hansen in 1956 and 1960. She reached the All England Open Badminton Championships singles final in 1949. and represented Denmark at the 1960 Uber Cup.

== Achievements ==
=== International tournaments ===
Women's singles
Year	Tournament	Opponent	Score	Result
1949	All England	(Denmark) Aase Schiøtt Jacobsen	11–8, 8–11, 4–11	(silver) Runner-up
1951	Denmark Open	(Denmark) Tonny Ahm	2–11, 3–11	(silver) Runner-up

Women's doubles
Year	Tournament	Partner	Opponent	Score	Result
1949	Denmark Open	(Denmark) Inge Birgit Hansen	(Denmark) Tonny Ahm (Denmark) Kirsten Thorndahl	8–15, 1–15	(silver) Runner-up
1951	Denmark Open	(Denmark) Inge Sørensen	(Denmark) Tonny Ahm (Denmark) Kirsten Thorndahl	17–16, 13–18, 4–15	(silver) Runner-up
1962	Swedish Open	(Denmark) Bente Kristiansen	(Denmark) Karin Jørgensen (Denmark) Ulla Rasmussen	10–15, 18–15, 15–4	(gold) Winner

Mixed doubles
Year	Tournament	Partner	Opponent	Score	Result
1948	All England	(Sweden) Conny Jepsen	(Denmark) Jørn Skaarup (Denmark) Kirsten Thorndahl	10–15, 2–15	(silver) Runner-up
1951	Denmark Open	(Denmark) Ib Olesen	(Denmark) Arve Lossmann (Denmark) Kirsten Thorndahl	15–10, 15–17, 2–15	(silver) Runner-up
1952	Denmark Open	(Denmark) Ib Olesen	(Malaysia) David Choong (Denmark) Tonny Ahm	8–15, 10–15	(silver) Runner-up
1958	All England	(Denmark) Finn Kobberø	(England) Tony Jordan (England) June Timperley	9–15, 15–7, 5–15	(silver) Runner-up
1962	Swedish Open	(Denmark) Jesper Sandvad	(Denmark) Finn Kobberø (Denmark) Anni Hammergaard Hansen	6–15, 7–15	(silver) Runner-up
