= Preben Dabelsteen =

Danish badminton player (1925–2017)

Personal information
- Born: 14 October 1925
- Died: 23 January 2017 (aged 91)

Sport
- Country: Denmark
- Sport: Badminton
Medal record
Representing Denmark
Men's badminton
Thomas Cup
| Silver medal – second place | 1949 Scotland–England | Team |

Preben Gustav Dabelsteen (14 October 1925 – 23 January 2017) was a Danish badminton player. He won five Danish doubles Championships with Jørn Skaarup and played on the national team until the mid 1950s. He also won 2 All England Open titles for men's doubles in 1948 and 1950.

== Achievements ==
=== International tournaments ===
Men's doubles
| Year | Tournament | Partner | Opponent | Score | Result |
|---|---|---|---|---|---|
| 1946 | Denmark Open | (Denmark) Jørn Skaarup | (Denmark) Erik Friis (Sweden) Conny Jepsen | 15–13, 15–6 | (gold) Winner |
| 1947 | Denmark Open | (Denmark) Jørn Skaarup | (Denmark) Carl Frøhlke (Denmark) Tage Madsen | 18–15, 11–15, 18–13 | (gold) Winner |
| 1947 | All England | (Denmark) Jørn Skaarup | (Denmark) Poul Holm (Denmark) Tage Madsen | 15–4, 12–15, 4–15 | (silver) Runner-up |
| 1948 | Denmark Open | (Denmark) Jørn Skaarup | (Denmark) Poul Holm (Denmark) Børge Frederiksen | 15–7, 13–15, 9–15 | (silver) Runner-up |
| 1948 | All England | (Denmark) Børge Frederiksen | (Sweden) Conny Jepsen (Sweden) Nils Jonson | 15–8, 16–18, 18–17 | (gold) Winner |
| 1950 | All England | (Denmark) Jørn Skaarup | (Denmark) Poul Holm (Denmark) Børge Frederiksen | 9–15, 15–2, 15–12 | (gold) Winner |
| 1951 | Denmark Open | (Denmark) Jørn Skaarup | (Malaysia) Ismail Marjan (Malaysia) Ong Poh Lim | 9–15, 5–15 | (silver) Runner-up |
| 1954 | Dutch Open | (Denmark) Jørn Skaarup | (Denmark) Jesper Sandvad (Denmark) Ole Mertz | 15–12, 18–14 | (gold) Winner |

Mixed doubles
| Year | Tournament | Partner | Opponent | Score | Result |
|---|---|---|---|---|---|
| 1954 | Dutch Open | (Denmark) Hanne Jensen | (Denmark) Jørn Skaarup (Denmark) Annelise Hansen | 3–15, 15–8 | (silver) Runner-up |
