= Judy Devlin =

English and American badminton player (1935–2024)

- Devlin in the 1966 U.S. Open program

Personal information
- Born: Judith Margaret Devlin; 22 October 1935 Winnipeg, Manitoba, Canada
- Died: 6 May 2024 (aged 88) Oxford, England
- Years active: 1953–1973
- Height: 1.68 m (5 ft 6 in)

Sport
- Country: United States; England
- Sport: Badminton
- Handedness: Right
- Event: Women's singles Women's doubles Mixed doubles
Medal record
Women's badminton
Representing United States
Uber Cup
Gold medal – first place	1957 Lancashire	Women's team
Gold medal – first place	1960 Philadelphia	Women's team
Gold medal – first place	1963 Wilmington	Women's team
Silver medal – second place	1966 Wellington	Women's team
Representing England
European Championships
Gold medal – first place	1972 Karlskrona	Women's doubles
Gold medal – first place	1972 Karlskrona	Mixed team

Judith Margaret Devlin (later Hashman; 22 October 1935 – 6 May 2024) was an American and English badminton player. Competing prior to the establishment of the World Championships and badminton's inclusion in the Summer Olympic Games, she won 78 international tournament titles.

Devlin accumulated 17 All England Open titles, comprising 10 women's singles and seven women's doubles championships, the most by any female player in the tournament's history. She also won 31 U.S. Open titles across singles, doubles, and mixed doubles events. In international team competition, she represented the United States in five consecutive Uber Cup campaigns from 1957 to 1969, helping the United States win three consecutive titles in 1957, 1960, and 1963.

Following her relocation to England and acquisition of British citizenship, she represented England internationally and won gold medals in women's doubles and the mixed team event at the 1972 European Championships. She was inducted into the Badminton Hall of Fame in 1997.

== Early life and background ==
Devlin was born in Winnipeg, Manitoba, Canada, on 22 October 1935. Her father, Frank Devlin, was a six-time All England men's singles champion from Ireland, while her mother, Grace (née Steed) Devlin, was a scientist who competed in doubles at the Wimbledon Championships. After her family moved to the Baltimore, Maryland area in the United States, she began playing badminton at age seven. Although her father initially encouraged her to pursue tennis, Devlin preferred badminton and trained under his guidance, developing a playing style characterized by power, accuracy, and consistency.

At the age of 13, Devlin won the girls' singles, girls' doubles, and mixed doubles titles at the 1949 U.S. Junior National Championships in Baltimore. In the singles final, she defeated her older sister, Susan Devlin. She went on to win the girls' singles title at the U.S. Junior National Championships six consecutive times from 1949 to 1954. She also won the girls' doubles title with Susan from 1949 to 1953, as well as the junior mixed doubles titles in 1949, 1950, and 1953. In 1953, she claimed her first senior national title by winning the women's doubles at the U.S. National Championships alongside her sister.

She attended Goucher College, majoring in English, and graduated in 1958. While at Goucher, she recalled practicing badminton for only about an hour a day. Devlin was also a multi-sport athlete, competing in field hockey, tennis, and lacrosse. She was a member of the U.S. Women's Lacrosse Team from 1954 to 1960 and was also selected for the Junior Wightman Tennis Cup squad.

== Career ==
=== Individual competition ===
Devlin (left) and Susan Devlin as the 1960 U.S. Open women's doubles champions.

Devlin won 78 international tournament titles and finished as runner-up 14 times. At the 1954 All England Championships, she won both the women's singles and women's doubles titles on her debut at the age of 18 years and four months. She defeated Iris Cooley in the singles final and became the youngest All England champion in the tournament's history. Partnering her sister Susan Devlin, she also defeated Cooley and June White in the women's doubles final. She went on to win 17 All England titles, comprising 10 women's singles and seven women's doubles championships. This total placed her joint third on the tournament's all-time list, behind only George Alan Thomas and her father, Frank Devlin. It was also the highest total achieved by a female player.

She won 31 titles at the U.S. Open across women's singles, women's doubles, and mixed doubles. She won 12 women's singles titles between 1954 and 1967, including eight consecutive championships from 1956 to 1963, as well as seven mixed doubles titles. In the American Badminton Association's 1955–56 national rankings, Devlin was ranked No. 1 in women's singles and No. 2 in women's doubles with her sister Susan.

Devlin receiving the women's singles trophy at the 1962 U.S. Open.

Her tournament victories extended across several countries, including eight titles in Germany, seven in Canada, four each in the Netherlands and Sweden, three each in Ireland and Jamaica, and two in Scotland. She also won two women's doubles titles at the English National Championships.

Devlin reached the All England women's singles final every year from 1954 to 1967 except 1965, when she returned to competition two months after giving birth to her son Geoff and reached the fourth round. In her final All England singles appearance in 1967, she defeated Noriko Takagi after recovering from a 1–5 deficit in the deciding game. Later that year, she retired from singles competition after completing a title hat-trick at the 1967 U.S. Open in Flint, Michigan, winning the women's singles, women's doubles, and mixed doubles events.

=== Uber Cup ===
The United States team with the Uber Cup in 1960; Devlin is standing fifth from left.

Devlin represented the United States in five consecutive Uber Cup campaigns between 1957 and 1969. Playing at No. 1 singles and No. 1 doubles, she compiled an overall record of 20 wins in 21 matches. She helped the United States win three consecutive titles in 1957, 1960, and 1963. In the inaugural 1957 Uber Cup, Devlin won her singles match and partnered her sister Susan to a doubles victory as the United States defeated Denmark 6–1. The United States retained the title in the 1960 Uber Cup challenge round, defeating Denmark 5–2; Devlin won in singles and partnered Susan in the No. 1 doubles match that secured the team's fourth point. The team retained the title again in 1963, defeating England 4–3. Devlin won all three of her matches, one in singles and two in doubles, accounting for three of the team's four points.

In 1966, the United States finished as runner-up after losing 5–2 to Japan. Devlin lost her singles match to Noriko Takagi, but partnered Rosine Jones to win both of the United States' points in doubles.

=== Relocation to England and European competition ===
Following her marriage in 1960, Devlin relocated to England and thereafter competed under her married name, Judy Hashman. She acquired British citizenship in 1970 and subsequently represented England internationally eight times. At the 1972 European Championships in Karlskrona, Sweden, she won gold medals in women's doubles with Gillian Gilks and in the mixed team event. Partnering Gilks, she also won the women's doubles title at the English National Championships in 1972 and 1973. She retired fully from competitive badminton in 1973.

== Coaching, writing, and administration ==
After her playing career, Hashman became a badminton coach and briefly served as head coach of the England team. At the 1978 European Championships, during her tenure, England won the mixed team title, three individual gold medals, and one silver medal. Hashman also wrote three instructional books on badminton: Badminton: A Champion's Way (1969), Starting Badminton (1977), and Winning Badminton (1981). At county level, she represented Berkshire more than 50 times, served as secretary of the county association, and established its first junior schools league.

== Personal life ==
In 1960, Devlin married English badminton player George Cecil Kenneth "Dick" Hashman, who worked for the United Kingdom Atomic Energy Authority, and moved to England. The pair had previously reached the mixed doubles semifinals at the All England Championships. She obtained British citizenship ten years later in 1970. On 21 March 1970, she was featured as a castaway on the BBC Radio program Desert Island Discs. She died from cancer in Oxford on 6 May 2024, at the age of 88.

== Honors and recognition ==
- U.S. Badminton Hall of Fame: Inducted in 1963.
- Ken Davidson Award: Received in 1966.
- International Badminton Federation (IBF) Distinguished Service Award: Received in 1985; she was the first woman to receive the award.
- Herbert Scheele Trophy: Awarded in 1995.
- International Women's Sports Hall of Fame: Inducted in 1995.
- Badminton Hall of Fame: Inducted in 1997 alongside her father, Frank Devlin.
- Goucher College Athletic Hall of Fame: Inducted as a member of its inaugural class in 2010, alongside her sister Susan Devlin.

== Achievements ==
=== European Championships ===
Women's doubles
Year	Venue	Partner	Opponent	Score	Result
1972	Karlskrona Idrottshall, Karlskrona, Sweden	(England) Gillian Gilks	(England) Margaret Beck (England) Julie Rickard	15–11, 15–7	Gold

=== International tournaments (78 titles, 14 runners-up) ===
Women's singles
Year	Tournament	Opponent	Score	Result	Ref.
1954	All England Open	(England) Iris Cooley	11–7, 11–5	(gold) Winner	
1954	U.S. Open	(United States) Margaret Varner Bloss	8–11, 11–6, 11–6	(gold) Winner	
1955	All England Open	(United States) Margaret Varner Bloss	12–9, 5–11, 1–11	(silver) Runner-up	
1955	U.S. Open	(United States) Margaret Varner Bloss	11–6, 9–12, 9–12	(silver) Runner-up	
1956	All England Open	(United States) Margaret Varner Bloss	8–11, 5–11	(silver) Runner-up	
1956	U.S. Open	(United States) Margaret Varner Bloss	12–10, 11–6	(gold) Winner	
1957	All England Open	(United States) Margaret Varner Bloss	11–2, 11–7	(gold) Winner	
1957	Canada Open	(United States) Lois Alston	11–2, 11–3	(gold) Winner	
1957	U.S. Open	(United States) Margaret Varner Bloss	11–2, 11–0	(gold) Winner	
1957	Jamaica Open	(United States) Susan Devlin	11–4, 11–1	(gold) Winner	
1958	All England Open	(United States) Margaret Varner Bloss	11–7, 12–10	(gold) Winner	
1958	U.S. Open	(United States) Dorothy O'Neil	11–2, 11–2	(gold) Winner	
1959	All England Open	(England) Heather Ward	7–11, 11–3, 4–11	(silver) Runner-up	
1959	Canada Open	(United States) Susan Devlin	11–1, 12–10	(gold) Winner	
1959	U.S. Open	(United States) Dorothy O'Neil	11–0, 11–1	(gold) Winner	
1960	All England Open	(United States) Margaret Varner Bloss	11–1, 11–9	(gold) Winner	
1960	U.S. Open	(United States) Margaret Varner Bloss	6–11, 11–7, 11–7	(gold) Winner	
1961	German Open	(New Zealand) Sonia Cox	11–1, 11–3	(gold) Winner	
1961	All England Open	(England) Ursula Smith	11–2, 11–6	(gold) Winner	
1961	Scottish Open	(Scotland) Wilma Tyre	11–2, 11–0	(gold) Winner	
1961	U.S. Open	(United States) H. McGregor Stewart	11–2, 11–3	(gold) Winner	
1962	German Open	(Denmark) Tonny Holst-Christensen	11–2, 11–3	(gold) Winner	
1962	All England Open	(England) Ursula Smith	11–4, 11–0	(gold) Winner	
1962	U.S. Open	(United States) H. McGregor Stewart	11–9, 11–2	(gold) Winner	
1963	German Open	(Denmark) Ulla Rasmussen	12–10, 12–9	(gold) Winner	
1963	All England Open	(England) Angela Bairstow	11–5, 11–9	(gold) Winner	
1963	U.S. Open	(England) Ursula Smith	11–6, 11–3	(gold) Winner	
1964	Swedish Open	(Denmark) Ulla Rasmussen	12–10, 11–3	(gold) Winner	
1964	Dutch Open	(England) Angela Bairstow	11–2, 11–2	(gold) Winner	
1964	German Open	(Denmark) Ulla Rasmussen	11–2, 11–3	(gold) Winner	
1964	All England Open	(England) Ursula Smith	11–0, 11–3	(gold) Winner	
1964	Irish Open	(Republic of Ireland) Mary O'Sullivan	11–5, 11–1	(gold) Winner	
1965	U.S. Open	(United States) Dorothy O'Neil	11–3, 11–0	(gold) Winner	
1966	Swedish Open	(Sweden) Eva Twedberg	11–0, 11–0	(gold) Winner	
1966	All England Open	(Netherlands) Imre Rietveld	11–6, 11–7	(gold) Winner	
1966	Canada Open	(Denmark) Ulla Strand	11–7, 11–7	(gold) Winner	
1966	U.S. Open	(Canada) Sharon Whittaker	11–6, 11–0	(gold) Winner	
1967	All England Open	(Japan) Noriko Takagi	5–11, 11–8, 12–10	(gold) Winner	
1967	U.S. Open	(Canada) Sharon Whittaker	11–3, 11–5	(gold) Winner	

Women's doubles
Year	Tournament	Partner	Opponent	Score	Result
1954	All England Open	(United States) Susan Devlin	(England) Iris Rogers (England) June White	15–7, 12–15, 15–8	(gold) Winner
1954	U.S. Open	(United States) Susan Devlin	(United States) Ethel Marshall (United States) Bea Massman	10–15, 15–10, 15–13	(gold) Winner
1955	All England Open	(United States) Susan Devlin	(England) Iris Rogers (England) June White	15–18, 15–10, 9–15	(silver) Runner-up
1955	U.S. Open	(United States) Susan Devlin	(United States) Janet Wright (United States) Thelma Welcome	15–10, 15–9	(gold) Winner
1956	All England Open	(United States) Susan Devlin	(England) Iris Rogers (England) June White	17–18, 15–12, 15–12	(gold) Winner
1956	U.S. Open	(United States) Susan Devlin	(United States) Ethel Marshall (United States) Bea Massman	15–10, 7–15, 9–15	(silver) Runner-up
1957	Canada Open	(United States) Susan Devlin	(United States) Ethel Marshall (United States) Bea Massman	15–5, 10–15, 15–3	(gold) Winner
1957	U.S. Open	(United States) Susan Devlin	(United States) Dorothy O'Neil (United States) Margaret Varner Bloss	7–15, 15–7, 15–5	(gold) Winner
1957	Jamaica Open	(Jamaica) Murray White	(United States) Susan Devlin (Jamaica) Hope Valentine	15–4, 15–7	(gold) Winner
1958	U.S. Open	(United States) Susan Devlin	(United States) Ethel Marshall (United States) Bea Massman	15–10, 15–7	(gold) Winner
1959	All England Open	(United States) Susan Devlin	(England) Iris Rogers (England) June White	15–11, 10–15, 11–15	(silver) Runner-up
1959	Canada Open	(United States) Susan Devlin	(Canada) Joan Hennessy (Canada) Marjory Shedd	15–3, 15–1	(gold) Winner
1959	U.S. Open	(United States) Susan Devlin	(United States) Ethel Marshall (United States) Bea Massman	15–8, 15–8	(gold) Winner
1960	All England Open	(United States) Susan Devlin	(Denmark) Inge Birgit Hansen (Denmark) Kirsten Thorndahl	15–13, 15–6	(gold) Winner
1960	U.S. Open	(Republic of Ireland) Sue Peard	(United States) Dorothy O'Neil (United States) Margaret Varner Bloss	15–13, 15–4	(gold) Winner
1961	German Open	(New Zealand) Sonia Cox	(West Germany) Irmgard Latz (West Germany) Hannelore Schmidt	15–5, 15–6	(gold) Winner
1961	All England Open	(Republic of Ireland) Sue Peard	(Scotland) Catherine Dunglison (Scotland) Wilma Tyre	15–5, 15–4	(gold) Winner
1961	Scottish Open	(Republic of Ireland) Sue Peard	(Republic of Ireland) Yvonne Kelly (Republic of Ireland) Mary O'Sullivan	15–9, 15–3	(gold) Winner
1961	U.S. Open	(Republic of Ireland) Sue Peard	(United States) Lois Alston (United States) Helen Tibbetts	15–11, 15–3	(gold) Winner
1962	German Open	(Denmark) Tonny Holst-Christensen	(Denmark) Karin Jørgensen (Denmark) Ulla Rasmussen	15–12, 15–9	(gold) Winner
1962	All England Open	(Denmark) Tonny Holst-Christensen	(Denmark) Karin Jørgensen (Denmark) Ulla Rasmussen	15–5, 15–3	(gold) Winner
1962	U.S. Open	(United States) Patricia Stephens	(United States) Ethel Marshall (United States) Bea Massman	15–10, 15–2	(gold) Winner
1963	German Open	(Republic of Ireland) Sue Peard	(Denmark) Karin Jørgensen (Denmark) Ulla Rasmussen	8–15, 10–15	(silver) Runner-up
1963	All England Open	(Republic of Ireland) Sue Peard	(Denmark) Karin Jørgensen (Denmark) Ulla Rasmussen	15–6, 15–9	(gold) Winner
1963	U.S. Open	(Republic of Ireland) Sue Peard	(England) Margaret Barrand (England) Ursula Smith	15–6, 15–7	(gold) Winner
1964	Swedish Open	(Republic of Ireland) Mary O'Sullivan	(Denmark) Karin Jørgensen (Denmark) Ulla Rasmussen	15–7, 15–3	(gold) Winner
1964	Dutch Open	(Republic of Ireland) Sue Peard	(England) Angela Bairstow (England) Jenny Pritchard	15–8, 15–11	(gold) Winner
1964	All England Open	(Republic of Ireland) Sue Peard	(Denmark) Karin Jørgensen (Denmark) Ulla Rasmussen	11–15, 15–6, 10–15	(silver) Runner-up
1964	Irish Open	(Republic of Ireland) Sue Peard	(Republic of Ireland) Lena McAleese (Republic of Ireland) Mary O'Sullivan	15–8, 15–7	(gold) Winner
1965	U.S. Open	(Republic of Ireland) Sue Peard	(England) Margaret Barrand (England) Jenny Pritchard	7–15, 13–15, 11–15	(silver) Runner-up
1966	Swedish Open	(Sweden) Eva Twedberg	(Denmark) Karin Jørgensen (Denmark) Ulla Strand	12–15, 15–10, 15–8	(gold) Winner
1966	German Open	(Republic of Ireland) Sue Peard	(Denmark) Karin Jørgensen (Denmark) Ulla Strand	15–7, 15–3	(gold) Winner
1966	All England Open	(Republic of Ireland) Sue Peard	(Denmark) Karin Jørgensen (Denmark) Ulla Strand	15–5, 14–17, 15–12	(gold) Winner
1966	Canada Open	(Republic of Ireland) Sue Peard	(United States) Tyna Barinaga (United States) Caroline Jensen	15–8, 14–17, 15–12	(gold) Winner
1966	U.S. Open	(Republic of Ireland) Sue Peard	(England) Ursula Smith (Denmark) Ulla Strand	15–5, 15–5	(gold) Winner
1967	All England Open	(England) Janet Brennan	(Netherlands) Imre Rietveld (Denmark) Ulla Strand	15–11, 8–15, 4–15	(silver) Runner-up
1967	U.S. Open	(United States) Rosine Jones	(United States) Tyna Barinaga (United States) Caroline Jensen	8–15, 15–11, 15–8	(gold) Winner
1971	Dutch Open	(England) Gillian Gilks	(Denmark) Karin Jørgensen (Denmark) Ulla Strand	15–6, 15–2	(gold) Winner
1971	All England Open	(England) Gillian Gilks	(Japan) Hiroe Yuki (Japan) Noriko Takagi	10–15, 13–18	(silver) Runner-up
1972	Dutch Open	(England) Gillian Gilks	(West Germany) Irmgard Gerlatzka (West Germany) Marieluise Wackerow	18–16, 15–5	(gold) Winner

Mixed doubles
Year	Tournament	Partner	Opponent	Score	Result
1956	U.S. Open	(Denmark) Finn Kobberø	(United States) Bob Williams (United States) Ethel Marshall	15–6, 15–11	(gold) Winner
1957	U.S. Open	(Denmark) Finn Kobberø	(United States) Bob Williams (United States) Ethel Marshall	15–0, 15–9	(gold) Winner
1957	Jamaica Open	(Jamaica) Allan Feres	(Jamaica) W. H. Murray White (United States) Susan Devlin	15–9, 15–10	(gold) Winner
1958	U.S. Open	(Denmark) Finn Kobberø	(United States) Bob Williams (United States) Ethel Marshall	15–5, 17–14	(gold) Winner
1959	Canada Open	(United States) Don P. Davis	(Canada) Bill Purcell (Canada) Marjory Shedd	11–15, 15–3, 15–10	(gold) Winner
1959	U.S. Open	(United States) Michael Roche	(United States) Joe Alston (United States) Lois Alston	15–9, 10–15, 17–15	(gold) Winner
1960	U.S. Open	(United States) Michael Roche	(Denmark) Finn Kobberø (United States) Margaret Varner Bloss	7–15, 2–15	(silver) Runner-up
1961	German Open	(Malaysia) Yeoh Kean Hua	(Malaysia) Oon Chong Teik (New Zealand) Sonia Cox	15–11, 15–12	(gold) Winner
1961	U.S. Open	(United States) Wynn Rogers	(United States) Joe Alston (United States) Lois Alston	18–13, 15–2	(gold) Winner
1962	U.S. Open	(United States) Wynn Rogers	(United States) Joe Alston (United States) Helen Tibbetts	15–4, 15–7	(gold) Winner
1964	German Open	(Malaysia) Oon Chong Teik	(Denmark) Finn Kobberø (Denmark) Anne Flindt	14–17, 10–15	(silver) Runner-up
1964	Irish Open	(Scotland) Robert McCoig	(Scotland) Mac Henderson (Scotland) Catherine Dunglison	15–9, 15–8	(gold) Winner
1967	U.S. Open	(Scotland) Jim Sydie	(Denmark) Erland Kops (Canada) Mimi Nilsson	18–13, 15–6	(gold) Winner
