= Anni Hammergaard Hansen =

Danish badminton player (1930–2000)

Sport
- Country: Denmark
- Sport: Badminton
Medal record
Women's badminton
Representing Denmark
Uber Cup
Silver medal – second place	1957 Lancashire	Team

Anni Hammergaard Hansen (née Jørgensen) (1930–2000) was a Danish badminton player.

== Career ==
Hansen won the women's doubles title at the 1957 All England Badminton Championships with Kirsten Granlund. She won four National championships and also represented Denmark at the 1957 Uber Cup.

== Achievements ==
=== International tournaments (10 titles, 3 runners-up) ===
Women's doubles

Year	Tournament	Partner	Opponent	Score	Result
1956	Denmark Open	(Denmark) Kirsten Thorndahl	(Denmark) Tonny Ahm (Denmark) Aase Schiøtt Jacobsen	15–2, 15–6	(gold) Winner
1956	Swedish Open	(Denmark) Kirsten Thorndahl	(Sweden) Bodil Sterner (Sweden) Tora Pihl	15–0, 15–1	(gold) Winner
1956	German Open	(Denmark) Hanne Jansen	(Denmark) Inger Kjærgaard (Denmark) Hanne Roest	15–6, 15–3	(gold) Winner
1957	All England Open	(Denmark) Kirsten Granlund	(England) Iris Rogers (England) June Timperley	7–15, 15–10, 15–11	(gold) Winner
1958	Swedish Open	(Denmark) Kirsten Granlund	(Denmark) Hanne Andersen (Denmark) Inger Kjærgaard	18–13, 15–2	(gold) Winner

Mixed doubles

Year	Tournament	Partner	Opponent	Score	Result
1956	Denmark Open	(Denmark) Jørn Skaarup	(Denmark) Finn Kobberø (Denmark) Inge Birgit Hansen	9–15, 15–7, 15–7	(gold) Winner
1956	Swedish Open	(Denmark) Jørgen Hammergaard Hansen	(Denmark) Poul-Erik Nielsen (Denmark) Kirsten Thorndahl	4–15, 15–10, 15–11	(gold) Winner
1956	German Open	(Denmark) Jørgen Hammergaard Hansen	(Denmark) Jørn Skaarup (Denmark) Hanne Jensen	15–8, 15–13	(gold) Winner
1956	All England Open	(Denmark) Jørgen Hammergaard Hansen	(England) Tony Jordan (England) June Timperley	15–18, 15–6, 8–15	(silver) Runner-up
1957	All England Open	(Denmark) Jørgen Hammergaard Hansen	(Denmark) Finn Kobberø (Denmark) Kirsten Granlund	3–15, 6–15	(silver) Runner-up
1958	Swedish Open	(Denmark) Jørgen Hammergaard Hansen	(Denmark) Palle Granlund (Denmark) Kirsten Granlund	14–18, 17–14, 15–11	(gold) Winner
1962	Swedish Open	(Denmark) Finn Kobberø	(Denmark) Jesper Sandvad (Denmark) Aase Winther	15–6, 15–7	(gold) Winner
1962	German Open	(Denmark) Jørgen Hammergaard Hansen	(Denmark) Finn Kobberø (Denmark) Hanne Andersen	4–15, 10–15	(silver) Runner-up
