= Finn Kobberø =

Danish badminton player

Personal information
- Born: 13 March 1936
- Died: 21 January 2009 (aged 72)
- Years active: 1955–1966

Sport
- Country: Denmark
- Sport: Badminton
- Event: Doubles, singles
Medal record
Men's badminton
Representing Denmark
Thomas Cup
Silver medal – second place	1955 Tokyo	Team
Silver medal – second place	1964 Tokyo	Team

Finn Kobberø (13 March 1936 – 21 January 2009) was a badminton player from Denmark, who won numerous international titles in all of badminton's three events (singles, doubles, and mixed doubles) from the mid-1950s to the mid-1960s.

== Career ==
He was one of the most successful players in the history of the All England Open Badminton Championships with 15 titles between 1955 and 1966, 7 in men's doubles, mainly with hard-hitting Jorgen Hammergaard Hansen, and 8 in mixed doubles. He was also a three-time singles finalist at the All-Englands despite a storied disdain for physical conditioning. A leading player on all of Denmark's Thomas Cup (men's international) teams from 1954 through 1964, he won 55 of 64 individual matches. Powerful, quick, and deceptive, he has been rated among the most talented players in the sport's history. He won 22 Danish national championships in all. He also won each of the three events at the Danish Open Championships though the tournament was not held during most of the years that he was active as a player.

Kobberø was inducted into the Badminton Hall of Fame in 1997. He later worked as a sports journalist for national television in Denmark. He died January 21, 2009.

== Achievements ==
=== International tournaments (51 titles, 19 runners-up) ===
Men's singles
Year	Tournament	Opponent	Score	Result
1953	Denmark Open	(Malaysia) Eddy Choong	3–15, 7–15	(silver) Runner-up
1955	Norwegian International	(Sweden) Leif Ekedahl	15–8, 15–6	(gold) Winner
1956	Denmark Open	(Denmark) Palle Granlund	15–2, 15–7	(gold) Winner
1956	All England	(Malaysia) Eddy Choong	15–11, 3–15, 11–15	(silver) Runner-up
1956	US Open	(United States) Joe Alston	15–11, 15–8	(gold) Winner
1956	Norwegian International	(Sweden) Bertil Glans	5–15, 18–15, 15–11	(gold) Winner
1957	Swedish Open	(Malaysia) Eddy Choong	15–11, 15–9	(gold) Winner
1957	US Open	(Malaysia) Eddy Choong	15–10, 2–15, 15–4	(gold) Winner
1958	Swedish Open	(Denmark) Erland Kops	15–11, 15–10	(gold) Winner
1958	All England	(Denmark) Erland Kops	10–15, 15–8, 8–15	(silver) Runner-up
1958	US Open	(United States) Jim Poole	8–15, 15–6, 7–15	(silver) Runner-up
1960	Mexico International	(Malaysia) Teh Kew San	7–15, 7–15	(silver) Runner-up
1960	Canada Open	(Indonesia) Tan Joe Hok	15–10, 8–15, 13–15	(silver) Runner-up
1961	All England	(Denmark) Erland Kops	10–15, 6–15	(silver) Runner-up
1962	French Open	(Thailand) Charoen Wattanasin	4–15, 13–18	(silver) Runner-up
1962	Belgian International	(Malaysia) Oon Chong Teik	11–15, 6–15	(silver) Runner-up

Men's doubles
Year	Tournament	Partner	Opponent	Score	Result
1955	All England	(Denmark) Jørgen Hammergaard Hansen	(Malaysia) Eddy Choong (Malaysia) David Choong	15–9, 14–17, 15–11	(gold) Winner
1955	Norwegian International	(Denmark) Jørgen Hammergaard Hansen	(Sweden) Leif Ekedahl (Sweden) Berndt Dahlberg	15–11, 15–7	(gold) Winner
1955	Malaysia Open	(Denmark) Jørgen Hammergaard Hansen	(Malaysia) Ong Poh Lim (Malaysia) Ooi Teik Hock	7–15, 17–18	(silver) Runner-up
1956	All England	(Denmark) Jørgen Hammergaard Hansen	(Denmark) John Nygaard (Denmark) Poul-Erik Nielsen	18–14, 15–5	(gold) Winner
1956	Norwegian International	(Denmark) Jørgen Hammergaard Hansen	(Sweden) Bertil Glans (Sweden) Ingemar Eliasson	15–10, 15–11	(gold) Winner
1956	Denmark Open	(Denmark) Jørgen Hammergaard Hansen	(Denmark) John Nygaard (Denmark) Poul-Erik Nielsen	7–15, 15–8, 17–14	(gold) Winner
1956	US Open	(Denmark) Jørgen Hammergaard Hansen	(Malaysia) Ong Poh Lim (Malaysia) Ooi Teik Hock	15–8, 9–15, 15–7	(gold) Winner
1957	US Open	(Denmark) Jørgen Hammergaard Hansen	(Malaysia) Eddy Choong (Canada) Bert Fergus	15–12, 15–2	(gold) Winner
1957	Swedish Open	(Denmark) Jørgen Hammergaard Hansen	(Malaysia) Eddy Choong (Malaysia) Oon Chong Teik	15–5, 15–12	(gold) Winner
1958	All England	(Denmark) Jørgen Hammergaard Hansen	(Denmark) Erland Kops (Denmark) Poul-Erik Nielsen	7–15, 15–11, 8–15	(silver) Runner-up
1958	Swedish Open	(Denmark) Jørgen Hammergaard Hansen	(Denmark) Ole Mertz (Denmark) Poul-Erik Nielsen	15–12, 6–15, 13–15	(silver) Runner-up
1958	US Open	(Denmark) Jørgen Hammergaard Hansen	(United States) Wynn Rogers (United States) Bob Williams	15–1, 15–8	(gold) Winner
1960	All England	(Denmark) Poul-Erik Nielsen	(Malaysia) Lim Say Hup (Malaysia) Teh Kew San	14–17, 15–3, 15–11	(gold) Winner
1960	Swedish Open	(Denmark) Poul-Erik Nielsen	(Sweden) Berndt Dahlberg (Sweden) Bertil Glans	15–4, 15–4	(gold) Winner
1960	US Open	(Thailand) Charoen Wattanasin	(United States) Manuel Armendariz (United States) Jim Poole	15–6, 15–6	(gold) Winner
1961	All England	(Denmark) Jørgen Hammergaard Hansen	(Denmark) Erland Kops (Denmark) Poul-Erik Nielsen	15–6, 15–5	(gold) Winner
1961	French Open	(Denmark) Erland Kops	(Malaysia) Oon Chong Teik (Malaysia) Yeoh Kean Hua	15–6, 15–10	(gold) Winner
1961	Canada Open	(Denmark) Jørgen Hammergaard Hansen	(Denmark) Erland Kops (Scotland) Robert McCoig	15–8, 15–10	(gold) Winner
1962	German Open	(Denmark) Jørgen Hammergaard Hansen	(Denmark) Erland Kops (Denmark) Poul-Erik Nielsen	15–7, 15–13	(gold) Winner
1962	French Open	(Denmark) Bengt Nielsen	(Thailand) Charoen Wattanasin (Denmark) Torkild Nielsen	18–16, 1–15, 15–4	(gold) Winner
1962	Swedish Open	(Denmark) Jørgen Hammergaard Hansen	(Denmark) Henning Borch (Denmark) Knud Aage Nielsen	15–14, 7–15, 15–4	(gold) Winner
1962	Belgian International	(Denmark) Jørgen Hammergaard Hansen	(Malaysia) Oon Chong Teik (Denmark) Ole Mertz	15–9, 7–15, 6–15	(silver) Runner-up
1962	All England	(Denmark) Jørgen Hammergaard Hansen	(Thailand) Narong Bhornchima (Thailand) Raphi Kanchanaraphi	17–16, 15–3	(gold) Winner
1963	All England	(Denmark) Jørgen Hammergaard Hansen	(Indonesia) Tan Joe Hock (Indonesia) Ferry Sonneville	10–15, 15–4, 15–7	(gold) Winner
1964	German Open	(Denmark) Jørgen Hammergaard Hansen	(Denmark) Erland Kops (Denmark) Poul-Erik Nielsen	3–15, 6–15	(silver) Runner-up
1964	Swedish Open	(Denmark) Jørgen Hammergaard Hansen	(Denmark) Erland Kops (Denmark) Poul-Erik Nielsen	15–7, 17–14	(gold) Winner
1964	All England	(Denmark) Jørgen Hammergaard Hansen	(Denmark) Erland Kops (Denmark) Poul-Erik Nielsen	15–6, 15–3	(gold) Winner
1966	All England	(Denmark) Jørgen Hammergaard Hansen	(Malaysia) Ng Boon Bee (Malaysia) Tan Yee Khan	15–9, 9–15, 15–17	(silver) Runner-up

Mixed doubles
Year	Tournament	Partner	Opponent	Score	Result
1954	All England	(Denmark) Inge Birgit Hansen	(England) John Best (England) Iris Cooley	12–15, 0–15	(silver) Runner-up
1955	All England	(Denmark) Kirsten Thorndahl	(Malaysia) David Choong (England) June White	15–7, 15–13	(gold) Winner
1956	US Open	(United States) Judy Devlin	(United States) Bob Williams (United States) Ethel Marshall	15–6, 15–11	(gold) Winner
1956	Denmark Open	(Denmark) Inge Birgit Hansen	(Denmark) Jørn Skaarup (Denmark) Anni Hammergaard Hansen	15–9, 7–15, 7–15	(silver) Runner-up
1957	All England	(Denmark) Kirsten Granlund	(Denmark) Jørgen Hammergaard Hansen (Denmark) Anni Hammergaard Hansen	15–3, 15–6	(gold) Winner
1957	US Open	(United States) Judy Devlin	(United States) Bob Williams (United States) Ethel Marshall	15–0, 15–9	(gold) Winner
1958	All England	(Denmark) Aase Winther	(England) Tony Jordan (England) June Timperley	9–15, 15–7, 5–15	(silver) Runner-up
1958	US Open	(United States) Judy Devlin	(United States) Bob Williams (United States) Ethel Marshall	15–5, 17–14	(gold) Winner
1960	All England	(Denmark) Kirsten Granlund	(Denmark) Poul-Erik Nielsen (Denmark) Inge Birgit Hansen	15–7, 15–2	(gold) Winner
1960	Canada Open	(Canada) Jean Miller	(Indonesia) Tan Joe Hok (India) Sushila Kapadia	15–7, 15–7	(gold) Winner
1960	US Open	(United States) Margaret Varner	(United States) Michael Roche (United States) Judy Devlin	15–7, 15–2	(gold) Winner
1961	All England	(Denmark) Kirsten Granlund	(England) Tony Jordan (England) June Timperley	15–12, 15–5	(gold) Winner
1961	Canada Open	(Canada) Jean Miller	(Denmark) Jørgen Hammergaard Hansen (Canada) Marjory Shedd	15–3, 15–10	(gold) Winner
1962	Swedish Open	(Denmark) Anni Hammergaard Hansen	(Denmark) Jesper Sandvad (Denmark) Aase Winther	15–6, 15–7	(gold) Winner
1962	German Open	(Denmark) Hanne Andersen	(Denmark) Jørgen Hammergaard Hansen (Denmark) Anni Hammergaard Hansen	15–4, 15–10	(gold) Winner
1962	All England	(Denmark) Ulla Rasmussen	(Denmark) Poul-Erik Nielsen (Denmark) Inge Birgit Hansen	15–1, 15–11	(gold) Winner
1962	Belgian International	(Denmark) Ulla Rasmussen	(Denmark) Jørgen Hammergaard Hansen (Denmark) Karin Jørgensen	6–15, 15–10, 15–6	(gold) Winner
1962	French Open	(Malaysia) Tan Gaik Bee	(Thailand) Charoen Wattanasin (England) Veronica Brock	15–3, 15–2	(gold) Winner
1963	All England	(Denmark) Ulla Rasmussen	(England) Tony Jordan (England) June Timperley	15–8, 15–12	(gold) Winner
1964	Swedish Open	(Denmark) Anne Flindt	(Malaysia) Oon Chong Teik (United States) Judy Hashman	17–14, 15–10	(gold) Winner
1964	German Open	(Denmark) Bente Flindt	(Denmark) Knud Aage Nielsen (Denmark) Kirsten Thorndahl	15–9, 15–10	(gold) Winner
1964	All England	(Denmark) Ulla Rasmussen	(England) Tony Jordan (England) Jenny Pritchard	10–15, 13–18	(silver) Runner-up
1964	Nordic Championships	(Denmark) Ulla Rasmussen	(Denmark) Ole Mertz (Denmark) Annette Rye	15–6, 15–12	(gold) Winner
1965	All England	(Denmark) Ulla Strand	(England) Tony Jordan (England) Jenny Pritchard	9–15, 15–4, 15–12	(gold) Winner
1966	All England	(Denmark) Ulla Strand	(Denmark) Per Walsøe (Denmark) Pernille Mølgaard Hansen	15–13, 15–3	(gold) Winner
1966	Denmark Open	(Denmark) Ulla Strand	(Denmark) Per Walsøe (Denmark) Pernille Mølgaard Hansen	8–15, 15–7, 15–11	(gold) Winner

== Summary ==
Rank	Event	Date	Venue
1	Men's doubles	1955, 1956, 1960, 1961, 1962, 1963, 1964	All England Open
1	Mixed doubles	1955, 1957, 1960, 1961, 1962, 1963, 1965, 1966	All England Open
1	Men's singles	1956, 1957	U.S. Open
1	Men's doubles	1956, 1957, 1958, 1960	U.S. Open
1	Mixed doubles	1956, 1957, 1958, 1960	U.S. Open
1	Men's doubles	1961	Canada Open
1	Mixed doubles	1960, 1961	Canada Open
1	Men's singles	1957, 1958	Swedish Open
1	Men's doubles	1957, 1960, 1962, 1964	Swedish Open
1	Mixed doubles	1962, 1964	Swedish Open
1	Men's singles	1956	Denmark Open
1	Men's doubles	1956	Denmark Open
1	Mixed doubles	1966	Denmark Open
1	Mixed doubles	1964	Nordic Championships
1	Men's doubles	1961, 1962	French Open
1	Mixed doubles	1962	French Open
1	Men's doubles	1962	German Open
1	Mixed doubles	1962, 1964	German Open
2	Men's singles	1956, 1958, 1961	All England Open
2	Men's doubles	1958, 1966	All England Open
2	Mixed doubles	1954, 1958, 1964	All England Open
