= Børge Frederiksen =

Danish badminton player

Sport
- Country: Denmark
- Sport: Badminton

Børge Frederiksen is a Danish former badminton player. He won the All England Championship in men's doubles in 1948 with Preben Dabelsteen. In 1950 he reached the final with Poul Holm. He also won two Danish Championship titles in doubles - in 1943 with Jesper Bie and in 1949 with Tage Madsen and played on the national team until the beginning of the 1950s.

== Achievements ==
=== International tournaments ===
Men's doubles

Year	Tournament	Partner	Opponent	Score	Result
1948	Denmark Open	(Denmark) Tage Madsen	(Denmark) Preben Dabelsteen (Denmark) Jørn Skaarup	7–15, 15–13, 15–9	(gold) Winner
1948	All England Open	(Denmark) Tage Madsen	(Sweden) Conny Jepsen (Sweden) Nils Jonson	15–8, 16–18, 18–17	(gold) Winner
1950	All England Open	(Denmark) Poul Holm	(Denmark) Preben Dabelsteen (Denmark) Jørn Skaarup	15–9, 12–15, 12–15	(silver) Runner-up

Mixed doubles

Year	Tournament	Partner	Opponent	Score	Result
1950	Denmark Open	(Denmark) Tonny Ahm	(Denmark) Arve Lossmann (Denmark) Kirsten Thorndahl	9–15, 18–14, 15–4	(gold) Winner
