= Harriet Bjerrum Nielsen =

Danish philologist and gender studies scholar

Harriet Bjerrum Nielsen (born 27 January 1948) is a Danish philologist and gender studies scholar. She was Professor of Gender Studies at the University of Oslo, and was Director of its Centre for Gender Research from 1993 to 2000 and from 2005 to 2009. Nielsen retired in 2017/2018. Her fields of expertise are gender and identity, subjectivity, gender socialization, and children and youth.

She graduated with a cand.phil. degree at the University of Copenhagen in 1977. In 1981, she became lecturer at the University of Oslo, and associate professor in 1987. She was appointed as the first Professor of Gender Studies at the university in 1993. She was a member of the university board of the University of Oslo from 2002 to 2005.

She worked at the Norwegian Academy of Science and Letters Centre for Advanced Study, studying children and youth's development in social and cultural contexts.

== Selected publications ==
- Skoletid. Universitetsforlaget 2009. ISBN 978-82-15-01418-0
- with Monica Rudberg: Moderne jenter. Universitetsforlaget 2006. ISBN 978-82-15-00955-1
- with Monica Rudberg: Psychological gender and Modernity. Scandinavian University Press. 1994.
- with Monica Rudberg: Historien om jenter og gutter. Universitetsforlaget 1989.
