= Conny Jepsen =

Danish-Swedish badminton player

Personal information
- Born: 18 January 1921 Vejle, Denmark
- Died: 3 February 1989 (aged 68) Lidingö, Sweden

Sport
- Country: Denmark; Sweden
- Sport: Badminton

Men's singles
- Career title: 1947 All-England

Conny Jepsen (18 January 1921 – 3 February 1989) was a badminton player from Denmark and Sweden.

He won the Danish Championships in 1939 and 1941 but emigrated to England and then Sweden during the Second World War. He won the All England Open Badminton Championships, considered the unofficial World Badminton Championships, in men's singles in 1947 when representing Sweden.

== Achievement ==
=== International tournaments ===
Men's singles
Year	Tournament	Opponent	Score	Result
1946	Denmark Open	(Denmark) Poul Holm	12–15, 15–5, 15–8	(gold) Winner
1947	All England Open	(British Raj) Prakash Nath	15–7, 15–11	(gold) Winner

Men's doubles
Year	Tournament	Partner	Opponent	Score	Result
1946	Denmark Open	(Denmark) Erik Friis	(Denmark) Preben Dabelsteen (Denmark) Jørn Skaarup	13–15, 6–15	(silver) Runner-up
1948	All England Open	(Sweden) Nils Jonson	(Denmark) Preben Dabelsteen (Denmark) Børge Frederiksen	8–15, 18–16, 17–18	(silver) Runner-up

Mixed doubles
Year	Tournament	Partner	Opponent	Score	Result
1948	All England Open	(Denmark) Aase Svendsen	(Denmark) Jørn Skaarup (Denmark) Kirsten Thorndahl	10–15, 2–15	(silver) Runner-up
