= Jørn Skaarup =

Danish badminton player (1925–1987)

Personal information
- Born: 13 September 1925 Nykøbing Falster, Denmark
- Died: 11 February 1987 (aged 61)

Sport
- Country: Denmark
- Sport: Badminton
- Career title: 1948 All England
Medal record
Men's badminton
Representing Denmark
Thomas Cup
Silver medal – second place	1949 Scotland–England	Men's team
Silver medal – second place	1955 Singapore	Men's team

Jørn Skaarup (13 September 1925 – 11 February 1987) was a Danish badminton player. He represented the Denmark national badminton team at the Thomas Cup from 1949 to 1955. Skaarup died on 11 February 1987, at the age of 61.

== Career ==
In 1948, Skaarup won the All England Open Badminton Championships, considered the unofficial World Badminton Championships. In 1952, Skaarup won the Denmark Open after defeating Eddy Choong in the final.

In doubles, Skaarup paired up with Preben Dabelsteen and together they have reached the finals of the All England Open in 1947 and 1950.

== Achievements ==
=== International tournaments ===
Men's singles
Year	Tournament	Opponent	Score	Result
1947	Denmark Open	(Denmark) Poul Holm	18–14, 10–15, 11–15	(silver) Runner-up
1948	Denmark Open	(Denmark) Mogens Felsby	15–7, 15–13	(gold) Winner
1948	All England	(Denmark) Poul Holm	15–3, 15–13	(gold) Winner
1952	Denmark Open	(Federation of Malaya) Eddy Choong	7–15, 15–9, 15–7	(gold) Winner
1954	Dutch Open	(Federation of Malaya) Eddy Choong	9–15, 10–15	(silver) Runner-up
1955	Malaysia Open	(Indonesia) Ferry Sonneville	5–15, 4–15	(silver) Runner-up

Men's doubles
Year	Tournament	Partner	Opponent	Score	Result
1946	Denmark Open	(Denmark) Preben Dabelsteen	(Denmark) Erik Friis (Sweden) Conny Jepsen	15–13, 15–6	(gold) Winner
1947	Denmark Open	(Denmark) Preben Dabelsteen	(Denmark) Carl Frøhlke (Denmark) Tage Madsen	18–15, 11–15, 18–13	(gold) Winner
1947	All England	(Denmark) Preben Dabelsteen	(Denmark) Poul Holm (Denmark) Tage Madsen	15–4, 12–15, 4–15	(silver) Runner-up
1948	Denmark Open	(Denmark) Preben Dabelsteen	(Denmark) Poul Holm (Denmark) Børge Frederiksen	15–7, 13–15, 9–15	(silver) Runner-up
1950	All England	(Denmark) Preben Dabelsteen	(Denmark) Poul Holm (Denmark) Børge Frederiksen	9–15, 15–2, 15–12	(gold) Winner
1951	Denmark Open	(Denmark) Preben Dabelsteen	(Malaysia) Ismail Marjan (Malaysia) Ong Poh Lim	9–15, 5–15	(silver) Runner-up
1954	Dutch Open	(Denmark) Preben Dabelsteen	(Denmark) Jesper Sandvad (Denmark) Ole Mertz	15–12, 18–14	(gold) Winner
1956	German Open	(Denmark) Jørgen Hammergaard Hansen	(Sweden) Atte Nyberg (Sweden) Rolf Olsson	15–11, 15–11	(gold) Winner

Mixed doubles
Year	Tournament	Partner	Opponent	Score	Result
1948	Denmark Open	(Denmark) Tonny Ahm	(Denmark) Tage Madsen (Denmark) Kirsten Thorndahl	13–18, 15–8, 7–15	(silver) Runner-up
1948	All England	(Denmark) Kirsten Thorndahl	(Sweden) Conny Jepsen (Denmark) Aase Svendsen	15–10, 15–2	(gold) Winner
1950	All England	(Denmark) Birgit Rostgaard-Frøhne	(Denmark) Poul Holm (Denmark) Tonny Ahm	3–15, 4–15	(silver) Runner-up
1954	Dutch Open	(Denmark) Annelise Hansen	(Denmark) Preben Dabelsteen (Denmark) Hanne Jensen	15–3, 18–15	(gold) Winner
1956	Denmark Open	(Denmark) Anni Hammergaard Hansen	(Denmark) Finn Kobberø (Denmark) Inge Birgit Hansen	13–18, 15–8, 7–15	(gold) Winner
1956	German Open	(Denmark) Hanne Jensen	(Denmark) Jørgen Hammergaard Hansen (Denmark) Anni Hammergaard Hansen	8–15, 13–15	(silver) Runner-up
