= Ethel Marshall =

American badminton player

Personal information
- Born: 6 May 1924
- Died: 12 June 2013 (aged 89)

Sport
- Country: United States
- Sport: Badminton
Medal record
Women's badminton
Representing United States
Uber Cup
Gold medal – first place	1957 Lancashire	Women's team

Ethel Marshall (May 6, 1924 - June 12, 2013) was an American badminton player noted for her mobility and shot-making prowess.

== Career ==
An all-around athlete who also excelled in softball and tennis, Marshall won the US Women's Singles title on all seven occasions that she contested it (1947–1953), defeating seventeen-year-old Judy Devlin (Hashman) in the last of these. She also won the US Women's Doubles title in 1952 and 1956 with Beatrice Massman, defeating the Devlin sisters on the latter occasion who had recently won the All-England women's doubles title. Marshall reached the final of US Women's Doubles on several other occasions, the last one in 1974 as she approached her fiftieth birthday.

Marshall was a member of the women's world team champion US Uber Cup squad in 1957 and coached the team in later years. She continued to compete into the 1980s and won numerous national age division titles. In 1956 the Buffalo based Marshall was among the first class of inductees into the U.S. Badminton Hall of Fame, now called the Walk of Fame.

== Achievements ==
=== International tournaments (2 titles, 9 runners-up) ===
Women's doubles
Year	Tournament	Partner	Opponent	Score	Result
1954	U.S. Open	(United States) Beatrice Massman	(United States) Judy Devlin (United States) Susan Devlin	15–10, 10–15, 13–15	(silver) Runner-up
1956	U.S. Open	(United States) Beatrice Massman	(United States) Judy Devlin (United States) Susan Devlin	10–15, 15–7, 15–10	(gold) Winner
1957	Canada Open	(United States) Beatrice Massman	(United States) Judy Devlin (United States) Susan Devlin	5–15, 15–10, 3–15	(silver) Runner-up
1958	U.S. Open	(United States) Beatrice Massman	(United States) Judy Devlin (United States) Susan Devlin	10–15, 7–15	(silver) Runner-up
1959	U.S. Open	(United States) Beatrice Massman	(United States) Judy Devlin (United States) Susan Devlin	8–15, 8–15	(silver) Runner-up
1962	U.S. Open	(United States) Beatrice Massman	(United States) Judy Hashman (United States) Patricia Stephens	10–15, 2–15	(silver) Runner-up
1971	U.S. Open	(United States) Dorothy O'Neil	(Japan) Noriko Takagi (Japan) Hiroe Yuki	8–15, 2–15	(silver) Runner-up

Mixed doubles
Year	Tournament	Partner	Opponent	Score	Result
1956	U.S. Open	(United States) Bob Williams	(Denmark) Finn Kobberø (United States) Judy Devlin	6–15, 11–15	(silver) Runner-up
1957	U.S. Open	(United States) Bob Williams	(Denmark) Finn Kobberø (United States) Judy Devlin	0–15, 9–15	(silver) Runner-up
1957	Canada Open	(United States) Bob Williams	(Canada) Bill Purcell (Canada) Marjory Shedd	15–8, 15–8	(gold) Winner
1958	U.S. Open	(United States) Bob Williams	(Denmark) Finn Kobberø (United States) Judy Devlin	5–15, 14–17	(silver) Runner-up

== Summary ==
Tournament	Event	Year
US Open	Women's doubles	1956
US Championships	Women's singles	1947, 1948, 1949, 1950, 1951, 1952, 1953
US Championships	Women's doubles	1952
Canadian Open	Mixed doubles	1957
Uber Cup	Women's team	1957
