= Jørgen Hammergaard Hansen =

Danish badminton player (1930–2013)

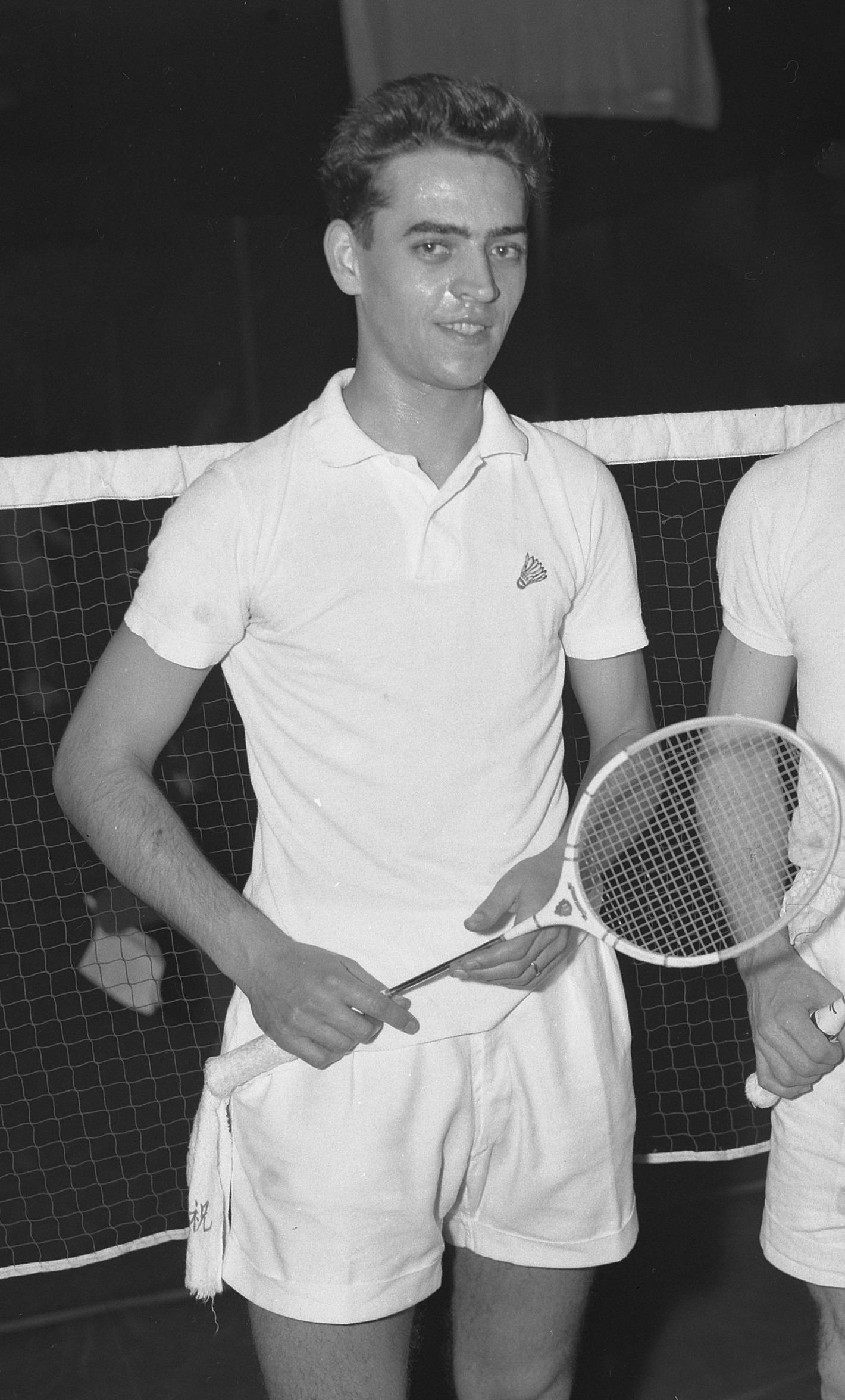
- Jørgen Hammergaard Hansen in 1957

Personal information
- Born: 1930
- Died: 22 August 2013 (aged 82–83)

Sport
- Country: Denmark
- Sport: Badminton
- Event: Men' and mixed Doubles
Medal record
Men's badminton
Representing Denmark
Thomas Cup
Silver medal – second place	1955 Tokyo	Team
Silver medal – second place	1964 Tokyo	Team

Jørgen Hammergaard Hansen (c. 1930 – 22 August 2013) was a Danish badminton player who won numerous major international titles from the mid-1950s to the mid-1960s.

== Career ==
Though he competed in singles at a strong international level during the first half of his career, it was as a doubles player that he made his mark, capturing six All-England men's doubles titles with Finn Kobberø (1955, 1956, 1961, 1962, 1963, 1964) and reaching the final round of the All-England mixed doubles on three occasions. Noted for his powerful smash which included an ability to smash off his backhand with the heavy rackets of the day, Hammergaard Hansen took part in five consecutive Thomas Cup (men's international team) campaigns for Denmark between 1952 and 1964, winning over 80 percent of his matches. In 1998 he was inducted into the Badminton Hall of Fame.

== Achievements ==
=== International tournaments (21 titles, 14 runners-up) ===
Men's singles
Year	Tournament	Opponent	Score	Result
1956	Swedish Open	(Sweden) Leif Ekedahl	6–15, 10–15	(silver) Runner-up

Men's doubles
Year	Tournament	Partner	Opponent	Score	Result
1955	All England	(Denmark) Finn Kobberø	(Malaysia) Eddy Choong (Malaysia) David Choong	15–9, 14–17, 15–11	(gold) Winner
1955	Malaysia Open	(Denmark) Finn Kobberø	(Malaysia) Ong Poh Lim (Malaysia) Ooi Teik Hock	7–15, 17–18	(silver) Runner-up
1955	Norwegian International	(Denmark) Finn Kobberø	(Sweden) Berndt Dahlberg (Sweden) Leif Ekedahl	15–11, 15–7	(gold) Winner
1956	German Open	(Denmark) Jørn Skaarup	(Sweden) Atte Nyberg (Sweden) Rolf Olsson	15–11, 15–11	(gold) Winner
1956	All England	(Denmark) Finn Kobberø	(Denmark) John Nygaard (Denmark) Poul-Erik Nielsen	18–14, 15–5	(gold) Winner
1956	US Open	(Denmark) Finn Kobberø	(Malaysia) Ong Poh Lim (Malaysia) Ooi Teik Hock	15–8, 9–15, 15–7	(gold) Winner
1956	Denmark Open	(Denmark) Finn Kobberø	(Denmark) John Nygaard (Denmark) Poul-Erik Nielsen	7–15, 15–8, 17–14	(gold) Winner
1956	Norwegian International	(Denmark) Finn Kobberø	(Sweden) Ingemar Eliasson (Sweden) Bertil Glans	15–10, 15–11	(gold) Winner
1957	US Open	(Denmark) Finn Kobberø	(Malaysia) Eddy Choong (Canada) Bert Fergus	15–12, 15–2	(gold) Winner
1957	Swedish Open	(Denmark) Finn Kobberø	(Malaysia) Eddy Choong (Malaysia) Oon Chong Teik	15–5, 15–12	(gold) Winner
1958	All England	(Denmark) Finn Kobberø	(Denmark) Erland Kops (Denmark) Poul-Erik Nielsen	7–15, 15–11, 8–15	(silver) Runner-up
1958	Swedish Open	(Denmark) Finn Kobberø	(Denmark) Ole Mertz (Denmark) Poul-Erik Nielsen	15–12, 6–15, 13–15	(silver) Runner-up
1959	All England	(Denmark) Henning Borch	(Malaysia) Lim Say Hup (Malaysia) Teh Kew San	12–15, 10–15	(silver) Runner-up
1961	All England	(Denmark) Finn Kobberø	(Denmark) Erland Kops (Denmark) Poul-Erik Nielsen	15–6, 15–5	(gold) Winner
1961	Canada Open	(Denmark) Finn Kobberø	(Denmark) Erland Kops (Scotland) Robert McCoig	15–8, 15–10	(gold) Winner
1962	German Open	(Denmark) Finn Kobberø	(Denmark) Erland Kops (Denmark) Poul-Erik Nielsen	15–7, 15–13	(gold) Winner
1962	Belgian International	(Denmark) Finn Kobberø	(Malaysia) Oon Chong Teik (Denmark) Ole Mertz	15–9, 7–15, 6–15	(silver) Runner-up
1962	All England	(Denmark) Finn Kobberø	(Thailand) Narong Bhornchima (Thailand) Raphi Kanchanaraphi	17–16, 15–3	(gold) Winner
1962	Swedish Open	(Denmark) Finn Kobberø	(Denmark) Henning Borch (Denmark) Knud Aage Nielsen	15–14, 7–15, 15–4	(gold) Winner
1963	All England	(Denmark) Finn Kobberø	(Indonesia) Tan Joe Hock (Indonesia) Ferry Sonneville	10–15, 15–4, 15–7	(gold) Winner
1964	German Open	(Denmark) Finn Kobberø	(Denmark) Erland Kops (Denmark) Poul-Erik Nielsen	3–15, 6–15	(silver) Runner-up
1964	All England	(Denmark) Finn Kobberø	(Denmark) Erland Kops (Denmark) Poul-Erik Nielsen	15–6, 15–3	(gold) Winner
1964	Swedish Open	(Denmark) Finn Kobberø	(Denmark) Erland Kops (Denmark) Poul-Erik Nielsen	15–7, 17–14	(gold) Winner
1966	All England	(Denmark) Finn Kobberø	(Malaysia) Ng Boon Bee (Malaysia) Tan Yee Khan	15–9, 9–15, 15–17	(silver) Runner-up

Mixed doubles
Year	Tournament	Partner	Opponent	Score	Result
1955	Malaysia Open	(Malaysia) Amy Choong	(Malaysia) Chan Kon Leong (Malaysia) Cecilia Samuel	17–15, 15–11	(gold) Winner
1956	German Open	(Denmark) Anni Jørgensen	(Denmark) Jørn Skaarup (Denmark) Hanne Jensen	15–8, 15–13	(gold) Winner
1956	All England	(Denmark) Anni Jørgensen	(England) Tony Jordan (England) June Timperley	15–18, 15–6, 8–15	(silver) Runner-up
1956	Swedish Open	(Denmark) Anni Hammergaard Hansen	(Denmark) Poul-Erik Nielsen (Denmark) Kirsten Thorndahl	4–15, 15–11, 15–10	(gold) Winner
1957	All England	(Denmark) Anni Hammergaard Hansen	(Denmark) Finn Kobberø (Denmark) Kirsten Thorndahl	3–15, 6–15	(silver) Runner-up
1958	Swedish Open	(Denmark) Anni Hammergaard Hansen	(Denmark) Palle Granlund (Denmark) Kirsten Granlund	14–18, 17–14, 15–11	(gold) Winner
1959	All England	(Denmark) Kirsten Granlund	(Denmark) Poul-Erik Nielsen (Denmark) Inge Birgit Hansen	17–14, 7–15, 3–15	(silver) Runner-up
1961	Canada Open	(Canada) Marjory Shedd	(Denmark) Finn Kobberø (Canada) Jean Miller	3–15, 10–15	(silver) Runner-up
1962	German Open	(Denmark) Anni Hammergaard Hansen	(Denmark) Finn Kobberø (Denmark) Hanne Andersen	4–15, 10–15	(silver) Runner-up
1962	Belgian International	(Denmark) Karin Jørgensen	(Denmark) Finn Kobberø (Denmark) Ulla Rasmussen	15–6, 10–15, 6–15	(silver) Runner-up
