= Susan Devlin =

American-Irish badminton player (born 1931)

Susan Devlin Peard
Personal information
- Born: Susan Devlin; 1931 (age 94–95) Winnipeg, Manitoba, Canada

Sport
- Country: United States; Ireland
- Sport: Badminton
- Handedness: Left
Medal record
Women's badminton
Representing United States
Uber Cup
Gold medal – first place	1957 Lancashire	Women's team
Gold medal – first place	1960 Philadelphia	Women's team

Susan Devlin Peard (born 1931) is an American-Irish former badminton player who represented both the US and Ireland in international competition. She is the daughter of J. Frank Devlin, an Irish badminton great, who moved his family to the United States in the late 1930s. She is the older sister of Judy Devlin Hashman, with whom she won numerous international women's doubles championships, including six titles at the prestigious All-England Championships (1954, 1956, 1960, 1961, 1963, 1966).

== Career ==
The Devlin sisters won a record ten United States women's doubles titles between 1953 and 1966. They also formed a doubles pairing that won all of its individual matches for the world champion U.S. Uber Cup (women's international) teams of 1957 and 1960. In 1960 Susan Devlin married Irish badminton player Frank Peard and thereafter resided in Ireland. She won two Irish national women's doubles titles and played Uber Cup for Ireland in the '62-'63 and '65-'66 campaigns. In 1976 she was inducted into the U.S. Badminton Hall of Fame, now known as the Walk of Fame. In 2009, both Susan and Judy were inducted into the Goucher College athletics Hall of Fame.

== Achievements ==
=== International tournaments (23 titles, 11 runners-up) ===
Women's singles
Year	Tournament	Opponent	Score	Result
1957	Jamaica Open	(United States) Judy Devlin	4–11, 1–11	(silver) Runner-up
1959	Canada Open	(United States) Judy Devlin	1–11, 10–12	(silver) Runner-up

Women's doubles
Year	Tournament	Partner	Opponent	Score	Result
1954	All England Open	(United States) Judy Devlin	(England) Iris Rogers (England) June White	15–7, 12–15, 15–8	(gold) Winner
1954	U.S. Open	(United States) Judy Devlin	(United States) Ethel Marshall (United States) Bea Massman	10–15, 15–10, 15–13	(gold) Winner
1955	All England Open	(United States) Judy Devlin	(England) Iris Rogers (England) June White	15–18, 15–10, 9–15	(silver) Runner-up
1955	U.S. Open	(United States) Judy Devlin	(United States) Janet Wright (United States) Thelma Welcome	15–10, 15–9	(gold) Winner
1956	All England Open	(United States) Judy Devlin	(England) Iris Rogers (England) June Timperley	17–18, 15–12, 15–12	(gold) Winner
1956	U.S. Open	(United States) Judy Devlin	(United States) Ethel Marshall (United States) Bea Massman	15–10, 7–15, 10–15	(silver) Runner-up
1957	Canada Open	(United States) Judy Devlin	(United States) Ethel Marshall (United States) Bea Massman	15–5, 10–15, 15–3	(gold) Winner
1957	U.S. Open	(United States) Judy Devlin	(United States) Dorothy O'Neil (United States) Margaret Varner	7–15, 15–7, 15–5	(gold) Winner
1957	Jamaica Open	(Jamaica) Hope Valentine	(United States) Judy Devlin (Jamaica) Murray White	4–15, 7–15	(silver) Runner-up
1958	U.S. Open	(United States) Judy Devlin	(United States) Ethel Marshall (United States) Bea Massman	15–10, 15–7	(gold) Winner
1959	All England Open	(United States) Judy Devlin	(England) Iris Rogers (England) June Timperley	15–11, 10–15, 11–15	(silver) Runner-up
1959	Canada Open	(United States) Judy Devlin	(Canada) Joan Hennessy (Canada) Marjory Shedd	15–3, 15–1	(gold) Winner
1959	U.S. Open	(United States) Judy Devlin	(United States) Ethel Marshall (United States) Bea Massman	15–8, 15–8	(gold) Winner
1960	All England Open	(United States) Judy Hashman	(Denmark) Kirsten Granlund (Denmark) Inge Birgit Hansen	15–3, 15–6	(gold) Winner
1960	U.S. Open	(United States) Judy Hashman	(United States) Dorothy O'Neil (United States) Margaret Varner	7–15, 15–7, 15–5	(gold) Winner
1961	All England Open	(United States) Judy Hashman	(Scotland) Catherine Dunglison (Scotland) Wilma Tyre	15–5, 15–4	(gold) Winner
1961	Irish Open	(Republic of Ireland) Lena Rea	(England) Jenny Pritchard (England) Ursula Smith	15–12, 12–15, 15–7	(gold) Winner
1961	U.S. Open	(United States) Judy Hashman	(United States) Lois Alston (United States) Helen Tibbetts	15–11, 15–3	(gold) Winner
1963	German Open	(United States) Judy Hashman	(Denmark) Karin Jørgensen (Denmark) Ulla Rasmussen	8–15, 10–15	(silver) Runner-up
1963	All England Open	(United States) Judy Hashman	(Denmark) Karin Jørgensen (Denmark) Ulla Rasmussen	15–6, 15–9	(gold) Winner
1963	U.S. Open	(United States) Judy Hashman	(England) Margaret Barrand (England) Ursula Smith	15–6, 15–7	(gold) Winner
1964	Dutch Open	(United States) Judy Hashman	(England) Angela Bairstow (England) Jenny Pritchard	15–8, 15–11	(gold) Winner
1964	All England Open	(United States) Judy Hashman	(Denmark) Karin Jørgensen (Denmark) Ulla Rasmussen	11–15, 15–6, 10–15	(silver) Runner-up
1964	Irish Open	(United States) Judy Hashman	(Republic of Ireland) Lena Rea (Republic of Ireland) Mary O'Sullivan	15–8, 15–7	(gold) Winner
1965	U.S. Open	(United States) Judy Hashman	(England) Margaret Barrand (England) Jenny Pritchard	7–15, 15–13, 11–15	(silver) Runner-up
1966	German Open	(United States) Judy Hashman	(Denmark) Karin Jørgensen (Denmark) Ulla Strand	15–7, 15–3	(gold) Winner
1966	All England Open	(United States) Judy Hashman	(Denmark) Karin Jørgensen (Denmark) Ulla Strand	15–5, 14–17, 15–12	(gold) Winner
1966	Irish Open	(Republic of Ireland) Lena Rea	(Republic of Ireland) Yvonne Kelly (Republic of Ireland) Mary O'Sullivan	2–15, 10–15	(silver) Runner-up
1966	Canada Open	(United States) Judy Hashman	(United States) Tyna Barinaga (United States) Caroline Jensen	15–8, 14–17, 15–12	(gold) Winner
1966	U.S. Open	(United States) Judy Hashman	(England) Ursula Smith (Denmark) Ulla Strand	15–5, 15–5	(gold) Winner
1970	Irish Open	(Republic of Ireland) Yvonne Kelly	(Republic of Ireland) Lena Rea (Republic of Ireland) Joan McCloy	15–3, 11–15, 15–8	(gold) Winner

Mixed doubles
Year	Tournament	Partner	Opponent	Score	Result
1957	Jamaica Open	(Jamaica) W. H. Murray White	(Jamaica) Allan Feres (United States) Judy Devlin	9–15, 10–15	(silver) Runner-up
