= Kirsten Thorndahl =

Danish badminton player

Personal information
- Born: 9 April 1928
- Died: 21 September 2007 (aged 79)

Sport
- Country: Denmark
- Sport: Badminton
- Handedness: Left
Medal record
Representing Denmark
Women's badminton
Uber Cup
Silver medal – second place	1957 Lancashire	Team
Silver medal – second place	1960 Philadelphia	Team

Kirsten Thorndahl (also known as 'Kirsten Granlund; 9 April 1928 – 21 September 2007) was a Danish badminton player. She reached the All England final 17 times and represented Denmark at the Uber Cup. Thorndahl had won eleven All England titles. She became the first player to become an All England Open champion in all three categories: women's singles, women's doubles and mixed doubles in the same year. Despite sweeping the boards in 1948, Thorndahl did not gained so much success in the singles department despite winning 2 more national championships in 1947 and 1951 which led her to abandon the discipline altogether. She claimed she was too nervous playing alone in the court during singles and it was more physically demanded.

== Achievements ==
=== International tournaments (25 titles, 16 runners-up) ===
Women's singles
Year	Tournament	Opponent	Score	Result
1947	All England Open	(Denmark) Marie Ussing	6–11, 11–6, 10–12	(silver) Runner-up
1947	Denmark Open	(Denmark) Tonny Ahm	walkover	(silver) Runner-up
1948	All England Open	(Denmark) Tonny Ahm	11–7, 11–0	(gold) Winner
1948	Denmark Open	(Denmark) Tonny Ahm	12–11, 5–11, 3–11	(silver) Runner-up
1949	Denmark Open	(Denmark) Tonny Ahm	4–11, 3–11	(silver) Runner-up
1950	Denmark Open	(Denmark) Tonny Ahm	8–11, 0–11	(silver) Runner-up

Women's doubles
Year	Tournament	Partner	Opponent	Score	Result
1946	Denmark Open	(Denmark) Tonny Ahm	(Denmark) Agnete Friis (Denmark) Marie Ussing	15–10, 15–7	(gold) Winner
1947	All England Open	(Denmark) Tonny Ahm	(Denmark) Aase Schiøtt Jacobsen (Denmark) Marie Ussing	15–8, 15–7	(gold) Winner
1947	Denmark Open	(Denmark) Tonny Ahm	(Denmark) Aase Schiøtt Jacobsen (Denmark) Marie Ussing	7–15, 15–5, 4–15	(silver) Runner-up
1948	All England Open	(Denmark) Tonny Ahm	(England) Queenie Allen (England) Betty Uber	15–6, 12–15, 15–2	(gold) Winner
1948	Denmark Open	(Denmark) Tonny Ahm	(England) Queenie Allen (England) Betty Uber	15–4, 15–11	(gold) Winner
1949	All England Open	(Denmark) Tonny Ahm	(England) Queenie Allen (England) Betty Uber	8–15, 10–15	(silver) Runner-up
1949	Denmark Open	(Denmark) Tonny Ahm	(Denmark) Inge Birgit Hansen (Denmark) Aase Svendsen	15–8, 15–1	(gold) Winner
1950	All England Open	(Denmark) Tonny Ahm	(England) Queenie Allen (England) Betty Uber	16–17, 15–5, 15–8	(gold) Winner
1950	Denmark Open	(Denmark) Tonny Ahm	(England) Queenie Allen (England) Elisabeth O'Beirne	15–2, 15–6	(gold) Winner
1951	All England Open	(Denmark) Tonny Ahm	(England) Mavis Henderson (England) Queenie Webber	17–15, 15–7	(gold) Winner
1951	Denmark Open	(Denmark) Tonny Ahm	(Denmark) Inge Sørensen (Denmark) Aase Svendsen	16–17, 18–13, 15–4	(gold) Winner
1952	Denmark Open	(Denmark) Tonny Ahm	(Denmark) Agnete Friis (Denmark) Aase Schiøtt Jacobsen	15–7, 15–3	(gold) Winner
1956	Denmark Open	(Denmark) Anni Jørgensen	(Denmark) Tonny Ahm (Denmark) Aase Schiøtt Jacobsen	15–2, 15–6	(gold) Winner
1956	Swedish Open	(Denmark) Anni Jørgensen	(Sweden) Bodil Sterner (Sweden) Tora Pihl	15–0, 15–1	(gold) Winner
1957	All England Open	(Denmark) Anni Hammergaard Hansen	(England) Iris Rogers (England) June Timperley	7–15, 15–11, 15–10	(gold) Winner
1958	Swedish Open	(Denmark) Anni Hammergaard Hansen	(Denmark) Hanne Andersen (Denmark) Inger Kjærgaard	18–13, 15–2	(gold) Winner
1960	All England Open	(Denmark) Inge Birgit Hansen	(United States) Judy Devlin (United States) Susan Devlin	3–15, 6–15	(silver) Runner-up

Mixed doubles
Year	Tournament	Partner	Opponent	Score	Result
1946	Denmark Open	(Denmark) Tage Madsen	(Denmark) Poul Holm (Denmark) Marie Ussing	15–9, 15–7	(gold) Winner
1947	All England Open	(Denmark) Tage Madsen	(Denmark) Poul Holm (Denmark) Tonny Ahm	13–15, 15–13, 12–15	(silver) Runner-up
1947	Denmark Open	(Denmark) Tage Madsen	(Denmark) Poul Holm (Denmark) Aase Schiøtt Jacobsen	6–15, 15–4, 15–9	(gold) Winner
1948	All England Open	(Denmark) Jørn Skaarup	(Sweden) Conny Jepsen (Denmark) Aase Svendsen	15–10, 15–2	(gold) Winner
1948	Denmark Open	(Denmark) Tage Madsen	(Denmark) Jørn Skaarup (Denmark) Tonny Ahm	18–13, 8–15, 15–7	(gold) Winner
1949	Denmark Open	(Denmark) Tage Madsen	(Malaysia) Chan Kon Leong (Denmark) Tonny Ahm	15–9, 12–15, 2–15	(silver) Runner-up
1950	Denmark Open	(Denmark) Arve Lossmann	(Denmark) Børge Frederiksen (Denmark) Tonny Ahm	15–9, 14–18, 4–15	(silver) Runner-up
1951	All England Open	(Denmark) Arve Lossmann	(Denmark) Poul Holm (Denmark) Tonny Ahm	15–8, 2–15, 4–15	(silver) Runner-up
1951	Denmark Open	(Denmark) Arve Lossmann	(Denmark) Ib Olesen (Denmark) Aase Svendsen	10–15, 17–15, 15–2	(gold) Winner
1955	All England Open	(Denmark) Finn Kobberø	(Malaysia) David Choong (England) June White	15–7, 15–13	(gold) Winner
1956	Swedish Open	(Denmark) Poul-Erik Nielsen	(Denmark) Jørgen Hammergaard Hansen (Denmark) Anni Hammergaard Hansen	15–4, 11–15, 10–15	(silver) Runner-up
1957	All England Open	(Denmark) Finn Kobberø	(Denmark) Jørgen Hammergaard Hansen (Denmark) Anni Hammergaard Hansen	15–3, 15–6	(gold) Winner
1958	Swedish Open	(Denmark) Palle Granlund	(Denmark) Jørgen Hammergaard Hansen (Denmark) Anni Hammergaard Hansen	18–14, 14–17, 11–15	(silver) Runner-up
1959	All England Open	(Denmark) Jørgen Hammergaard Hansen	(Denmark) Poul-Erik Nielsen (Denmark) Inge Birgit Hansen	17–14, 7–15, 3–15	(silver) Runner-up
1960	All England Open	(Denmark) Finn Kobberø	(Denmark) Poul-Erik Nielsen (Denmark) Inge Birgit Hansen	15–7, 15–2	(gold) Winner
1961	All England Open	(Denmark) Finn Kobberø	(England) Tony Jordan (England) June Timperley	15–12, 15–5	(gold) Winner
1963	German Open	(Denmark) Poul-Erik Nielsen	(Indonesia) Ferry Sonneville (Indonesia) Yvonne Theresia Sonneville	15–4, 17–14	(gold) Winner
1964	German Open	(Denmark) Knud Aage Nielsen	(Denmark) Finn Kobberø (Denmark) Bente Flindt	9–15, 10–15	(silver) Runner-up
