= 1949 Thomas Cup squads =

This article lists the squads for the 1949 Thomas Cup participating teams. The age listed for each player is on 22 February 1949 which was the first day of the tournament.

== Teams ==
=== Denmark ===
Six players represented Denmark in the 1949 Thomas Cup.

Name	DoB/Age
Knud Christensen	1921 (aged 27–28)
Preben Dabelsteen	14 October 1925 (aged 23)
Mogens Felsby	1929 (aged 19–20)
Poul Holm	1920 (aged 28–29)
Ib Olesen	1925 (aged 23–24)
Jørn Skaarup	13 September 1925 (aged 23)

=== Malaya ===
Eight players represented Malaya in the 1949 Thomas Cup.

Name	DoB/Age
Wong Peng Soon	17 February 1917 (aged 32)
Ooi Teik Hock	13 November 1920 (aged 28)
Chan Kon Leong	1917 (aged 31–32)
Teoh Seng Khoon	8 November 1918 (aged 30)
Lim Kee Fong	19 June 1922 (aged 26)
Ong Poh Lim	18 November 1923 (aged 25)
Law Teik Hock	4 July 1922 (aged 26)
Yeoh Teck Chye	14 December 1923 (aged 25)

=== United States ===
Six players represented the United States in the 1949 Thomas Cup.

Name	DoB/Age
David Guthrie Freeman	6 September 1920 (aged 28)
Carl Loveday	19 March 1921 (aged 27)
Marten Mendez	28 August 1916 (aged 32)
Thomas Wynn Rogers	1919 (aged 29–30)
Clinton Stephens	13 October 1919 (aged 29)
Bob Williams	1923 (aged 25–26)
