= 1949 Thomas Cup knockout stage =

Badminton tournament

The knockout stage for the 1949 Thomas Cup began on 22 February 1949 with the semi-finals and ended on 26 February with the final tie.

== Qualified teams ==
The teams that won their zonal tie qualified for the final knockout stage.

Group	Winners
A	United States
P	Malaya
E	Denmark

== Bracket ==
Semi-finals
21 February 1949 – Glasgow
Malaya	6
United States	3
Bye
Denmark

Final
25 February 1949 – Preston
Malaya	8
Denmark	1

== Semi-finals ==
=== Malaya vs United States ===
Malaya
6
Kelvin Hall, Glasgow, Scotland
21–22 February 1949

United States
3

			1	2	3
1	(Malaysia) (United States)	Wong Peng Soon; Marten Mendez	15; 11	11; 15	15; 10
2	(Malaysia) (United States)	Ooi Teik Hock; David G. Freeman	10; 15	15; 10	4; 15
3	(Malaysia) (United States)	Chan Kon Leong / Yeoh Teck Chye; Clinton Stephens / Bob Williams	15; 7	15; 11
4	(Malaysia) (United States)	Ooi Teik Hock / Teoh Seng Khoon; David G. Freeman / Wynn Rogers	15; 8	7; 15	15; 8
5	(Malaysia) (United States)	Wong Peng Soon; David G. Freeman	4; 15	1; 15
6	(Malaysia) (United States)	Ooi Teik Hock; Marten Mendez	15; 11	16; 17	15; 10
7	(Malaysia) (United States)	Law Teik Hock; Carl Loveday	12; 15	5; 15
8	(Malaysia) (United States)	Chan Kon Leong / Yeoh Teck Chye; David G. Freeman / Wynn Rogers	15; 9	15; 7
9	(Malaysia) (United States)	Ooi Teik Hock / Teoh Seng Khoon; Clinton Stephens / Bob Williams	9; 15	17; 16	15; 11

== Final ==
=== Malaya vs Denmark ===
Malaya
8
Queen's Hall, Preston, England
25–26 February 1949

Denmark
1

			1	2	3
1	(Malaysia) (Denmark)	Law Teik Hock; Jørn Skaarup	15; 5	15; 0
2	(Malaysia) (Denmark)	Ooi Teik Hock; Mogens Felsby	15; 9	15; 2
3	(Malaysia) (Denmark)	Chan Kon Leong / Yeoh Teck Chye; Poul Holm / Ib Olesen	15; 4	15; 6
4	(Malaysia) (Denmark)	Ooi Teik Hock / Teoh Seng Khoon; Jørn Skaarup / Preben Dabelsteen	15; 11	15; 10
5	(Malaysia) (Denmark)	Law Teik Hock; Mogens Felsby	11; 15	1; 15
6	(Malaysia) (Denmark)	Ooi Teik Hock; Jørn Skaarup	14; 18	15; 13	15; 9
7	(Malaysia) (Denmark)	Ong Poh Lim; Poul Holm	17; 14	15; 8
8	(Malaysia) (Denmark)	Chan Kong Leong / Yeoh Teck Chye; Jørn Skaarup / Preben Dabelsteen	15; 2	15; 4
9	(Malaysia) (Denmark)	Ooi Teik Hock / Teoh Seng Khoon; Poul Holm / Ib Olesen	15; 6	15; 7
