= 1952 Thomas Cup squads =

This article lists the squads for the 1952 Thomas Cup participating teams. The age listed for each player is on 24 May 1952 which was the first day of the tournament.

== Teams ==
=== Denmark ===
Six players represented Denmark in the 1952 Thomas Cup.

Name	DoB/Age
Poul Holm	1920 (aged 31–32)
Jørn Skaarup	13 September 1925 (aged 26)
Ole Jensen	5 June 1928 (aged 23)
Ib Olesen	1925 (aged 23–24)
John Nygaard	1925 (aged 23–24)
Jørgen Hammergaard Hansen	1930 (aged 21–22)

=== India ===
Eight players represented India in the 1952 Thomas Cup.

Name	DoB/Age
Devinder Mohan	1920 (aged 31–32)
Amrit Lal Dewan	1927 (aged 24–25)
Henry Ferreira	1926 (aged 25–26)
Manoj Guha	13 September 1927 (aged 24)
Gajanan Hemmady	1927 (aged 24–25)
Charanjit Lal Madan	1915 (aged 36–37)
Promod Nath	1927 (aged 24–25)
Trilok Nath Seth	1929 (aged 22–23)

=== Malaya ===
Eleven players represented Malaya in the 1952 Thomas Cup.

Name	DoB/Age
Ooi Teik Hock	13 November 1920 (aged 31)
Law Teik Hock	4 July 1922 (aged 29)
Lee Hoo Chye	1922 (aged 29–30)
Teoh Seng Khoon	8 November 1918 (aged 33)
Tan Jin Eong	1927 (aged 24–25)
Chan Kon Leong	1917 (aged 31–32)
Yeoh Teck Chye	14 December 1923 (aged 28)
Abdullah Piruz	14 September 1929 (aged 22)
Wong Peng Soon	17 February 1917 (aged 35)
Ong Poh Lim	18 November 1923 (aged 28)
Ismail Marjan	7 June 1920 (aged 31)

=== United States ===
Six players represented the United States in the 1952 Thomas Cup.

Name	DoB/Age
Marten Mendez	28 August 1916 (aged 35)
Joe Alston	20 December 1926 (aged 25)
Bob Williams	1923 (aged 25–26)
Dick Mitchell	18 July 1920 (aged 31)
Carl Loveday	19 March 1921 (aged 31)
Thomas Wynn Rogers	1919 (aged 29–30)
