= 1952 Thomas Cup knockout stage =

Badminton tournament

The knockout stage for the 1952 Thomas Cup began on 24 May 1952 with the first-round knockout and ended on 1 June with the final tie.

== Qualified teams ==
The teams that won their zonal tie qualified for the final knockout stage.

Group	Winners
C	Malaya
A	United States
P	India
E	Denmark

== Bracket ==
First round
Malaya
Bye
24 May 1952 – Kuala Lumpur
Denmark	3
India	6
United States
Bye

Second round
Malaya
Bye
27 May 1952 – Singapore
India	4
United States	5

Challenge round
31 May 1952 – Singapore
Malaya	7
United States	2

== First round ==
In a three way single elimination tournament within a tournament, the USA received the bye and awaited the winner of the tie between Denmark and India. The results here surprised some as the Danes, affected more by Kuala Lumpur's heat and humidity, were defeated 3–6. Either Trilok Nath Seth or Devinder Mohan Lal figured in all of the matches won by India.

Denmark
3
Selangor Badminton Association Hall
Kuala Lumpur, Malaya
24–25 May 1952

India
6

			1	2	3
1	(Denmark) (India)	Jørn Skaarup; Trilok Nath Seth	6; 15	13; 15
2	(Denmark) (India)	Poul Holm; Devinder Mohan	3; 15	10; 15
3	(Denmark) (India)	John Nygaard / Ib Olesen; Devinder Mohan / Henry Ferreira	17; 18	9; 15
4	(Denmark) (India)	Poul Holm / Ole Jensen; Manoj Guha / Trilok Nath Seth	15; 7	15; 10
5	(Denmark) (India)	Poul Holm; Trilok Nath Seth	1; 15	17; 18
6	(Denmark) (India)	Jørn Skaarup; Devinder Mohan	12; 15	16; 18
7	(Denmark) (India)	Ole Jensen; Amrit Lal Dewan	15; 8	15; 13
8	(Denmark) (India)	John Nygaard / Ib Olesen; Manoj Guha / Trilok Nath Seth	7; 15	15; 17
9	(Denmark) (India)	Poul Holm / Ole Jensen; Devinder Mohan / Henry Ferreira	15; 5	15; 7

== Second round ==
Three days later in Singapore, however, thirty-six-year-old Marten Mendez, who seemed to draw strength from the 40 degree Celsius heat inside Happy World Stadium, beat both Seth and Devinder in singles, helping The USA to a 4–1 lead. India then gamely fought back to win a series of close matches and pull even at four matches each. It was left to the strong U.S. doubles team of Joe Alston and Wynn Rogers to fight back from near defeat in the final match and clinch the victory for the Americans.

United States
5
Happy World Stadium, Singapore
27–28 May 1952

India
4

			1	2	3
1	(United States) (India)	Dick Mitchell; Devinder Mohan	15; 12	16; 17	1; 15
2	(United States) (India)	Marten Mendez; Trilok Nath Seth	15; 11	15; 1
3	(United States) (India)	Joey Alston / Wynn Rogers; Devinder Mohan / Henry Ferreira	15; 12	15; 8
4	(United States) (India)	Carl Loveday / Bob Williams; Manoj Guha / Trilok Nath Seth	15; 11	15; 9
5	(United States) (India)	Marten Mendez; Devinder Mohan	5; 15	15; 8	15; 3
6	(United States) (India)	Dick Mitchell; Trilok Nath Seth	8; 15	15; 5	1; 15
7	(United States) (India)	Joey Alston; Amrit Lal Dewan	15; 12	15; 17	1; 15
8	(United States) (India)	Carl Loveday / Bob Williams; Devinder Mohan / Henry Ferreira	10; 15	15; 3	17; 18
9	(United States) (India)	Joey Alston / Wynn Rogers; Manoj Guha / Trilok Nath Seth	6; 15	15; 10	15; 7

== Challenge round ==
An American team that no longer had the legendary Dave Freeman was further weakened when Joe Alston, a newly employed agent of the Federal Bureau of Investigation (FBI), was denied an extension of his leave. It faced a formidable Malayan squad, in Malaya, led by the cool and graceful Wong Peng Soon who, though almost as old as Marten Mendez, was still in his prime. He proved this by defeating Mendez and Dick Mitchell routinely in straight games. Malaya's most effective team member, however, might have been the quick and tenacious Ong Poh Lim who routed his opponent in the third singles match and won both of his doubles matches with Ismail bin Marjan. For the Americans, the exceptionally fit Mendez forced a third game default from Ooi Teik Hock while doubles specialist Wynn Rogers and hard smashing Bobby Williams split two close encounters with their Malayan counterparts. It was not enough against a deeper lineup, and Malaya retained the Thomas Cup at seven matches to two.

Malaya
7
Happy World Stadium, Singapore
31 May – 1 June 1952

United States
2

			1	2	3
1	(Malaysia) (United States)	Wong Peng Soon; Marten Mendez	15; 1	15; 10
2	(Malaysia) (United States)	Ooi Teik Hock; Dick Mitchell	15; 9	15; 11
3	(Malaysia) (United States)	Chan Kon Leong / Abdullah Piruz; Wynn Rogers / Bob Williams	15; 9	16; 18	9; 15
4	(Malaysia) (United States)	Ong Poh Lim / Ismail Marjan; Dick Mitchell / Carl Loveday	15; 5	15; 4
5	(Malaysia) (United States)	Wong Peng Soon; Dick Mitchell	15; 8	15; 5
6	(Malaysia) (United States)	Ooi Teik Hock; Marten Mendez	15; 11	10; 15		w/o
7	(Malaysia) (United States)	Ong Poh Lim; Bob Williams	15; 1	15; 6
8	(Malaysia) (United States)	Chan Kon Leong / Abdullah Piruz; Dick Mitchell / Carl Loveday	15; 2	15; 2
9	(Malaysia) (United States)	Ong Poh Lim / Ismail Marjan; Wynn Rogers / Bob Williams	15; 12	13; 15	15; 12
