= 1952 Thomas Cup qualification =

Tournament details
- Dates: 30 June 1951 – 24 March 1952
- Location: Pacific zone: Bombay; Melbourne American zone: Calgary European zone: Paris; Bessbrook; Nottingham; Copenhagen; Manchester

The qualifying process for the 1952 Thomas Cup took place from 30 June 1951 to 24 March 1952 to decide the final teams which will play in the final tournament.

== Qualification process ==
The qualification process is divided into three regions, the Pacific Zone, the American Zone and the European Zone. Teams in their respective zone will compete in a knockout format. Teams will compete for two days, with two singles and doubles played on the first day and three singles and two doubles played on the next day. The teams that win their respective zone will earn a place in the final tournament to be held in Singapore.

Malaya were the champions of the last Thomas Cup, therefore the team automatically qualified for the inter-zone play-offs.

=== Qualified teams ===
Country	Qualified as	Qualified on	Final appearance
Malaya	1949 Thomas Cup winners	26 February 1949	2nd
India	Pacific Zone winners	1 October 1951	1st
Denmark	European Zone winners	19 March 1952	2nd
United States	American Zone winners	24 March 1952	2nd

== Pacific Zone ==
=== Bracket ===
Semi-finals
30 June 1951 – Bombay
India	9
Thailand	0
Bye
Australia

Final
30 September 1951 – Melbourne
India	9
Australia	0

=== Semi-finals ===
India
9
Bombay, India
30 June – 1 July 1951

Thailand
0

			1	2	3
1	(India) (Thailand)	Trilok Nath Seth; Chutre Koepresert	15; 1	15; 5
2	(India) (Thailand)	Devinder Mohan; Tep Tattavorn	15; 0	15; 5
3	(India) (Thailand)	Henry Ferreira / Devinder Mohan; Chutre Koepresert / Pinit Pattabongse	15; 3	15; 9
4	(India) (Thailand)	Manoj Guha / Gajanan Hemmady; Kho Tan Jui / Sunthorn Subabandhu	18; 13	11; 15	15; 7
5	(India) (Thailand)	Henry Ferreira; Kho Tan Jui	15; 8	15; 0
6	(India) (Thailand)	Trilok Nath Seth; Tep Tattavorn	15; 7	15; 4
7	(India) (Thailand)	Devinder Mohan; Chutre Koepresert	15; 2	15; 2
8	(India) (Thailand)	Manoj Guha / Gajanan Hemmady; Chutre Koepresert / Pinit Pattabongse	15; 10	9; 15	15; 8
9	(India) (Thailand)	Devinder Mohan / Henry Ferreira; Kho Tan Jui / Sunthorn Subabandhu	15; 6	5; 10	15; 5

=== Final ===
India
9
Melbourne, Australia
30 September – 1 October 1951

Australia
0

			1	2	3
1	(India) (Australia)	Trilok Nath Seth; Dick Russell	15; 5	15; 5
2	(India) (Australia)	Devinder Mohan; Allan McCabe	15; 4	15; 0
3	(India) (Australia)	Manoj Guha / Gajanan Hemmady; Cliff Cutt / Dick Russell	15; 8	15; 1
4	(India) (Australia)	Henry Ferreira / Devinder Mohan; Allan McCabe / Arthur McCabe	10; 15	15; 9	15; 10
5	(India) (Australia)	Amrit Lal Dewan; Cliff Cutt	15; 5	15; 12
6	(India) (Australia)	Trilok Nath Seth; Allan McCabe	15; 4	15; 5
7	(India) (Australia)	Devinder Mohan; Dick Russell	15; 9	15; 0
8	(India) (Australia)	Devinder Mohan / Henry Ferreira; Allan McCabe / Arthur McCabe	15; 3	11; 15	15; 0
9	(India) (Australia)	Devinder Mohan / Henry Ferreira; Cliff Cutt / Dick Russell	16; 17	15; 4	15; 2

== American Zone ==
=== Bracket ===
Final
23 March 1952 – Calgary
United States	6
Canada	3

=== Final ===
United States
6
Calgary, Canada
23–24 March 1952

Canada
3

			1	2	3
1	(United States) (Canada)	Dick Mitchell; T. Darryl Thompson	15; 6	17; 16
2	(United States) (Canada)	Marten Mendez; Donald Smythe	15; 6	11; 15	12; 15
3	(United States) (Canada)	Carl Loveday / Bob Williams; T. Darryl Thompson / Gordon Simpson	15; 7	15; 9
4	(United States) (Canada)	Joey Alston / Wynn Rogers; Budd Porter / Donald Smythe	15; 8	15; 6
5	(United States) (Canada)	Joey Alston; Al Williams	15; 11	15; 6
6	(United States) (Canada)	Dick Mitchell; Donald Smythe	12; 15	9; 15
7	(United States) (Canada)	Marten Mendez; T. Darryl Thompson	18; 16	15; 2
8	(United States) (Canada)	Joey Alston / Wynn Rogers; Ken Forsythe / Grant Henry	15; 7	15; 10
9	(United States) (Canada)	Carl Loveday / Bob Williams; Budd Porter / Donald Smythe	16; 18	12; 15

== European Zone ==
=== Bracket ===
First round
Scotland
Bye
15 December 1951 – Paris
England	9
France	0
10 November 1951 – Bessbrook
Denmark	7
Ireland	2
Sweden
Bye

Semi-finals
2 February 1952 – Nottingham
Scotland	3
England	6
17 February 1952 – Copenhagen
Denmark	6
Sweden	3

Final
18 March 1952 – Manchester
England	0
Denmark	9

=== First round ===
Denmark
7
Bessbrook, Northern Ireland
10–11 November 1951

Ireland
2

			1	2	3
1	(Denmark) (Republic of Ireland)	Poul Holm; Frank Peard	15; 8	12; 15	15; 9
2	(Denmark) (Republic of Ireland)	Jørn Skaarup; James Doyle	15; 4	15; 5
3	(Denmark) (Republic of Ireland)	Preben Dabelsteen / Jørn Skaarup; Jim Fitzgibbon / Frank Peard	9; 15	12; 15
4	(Denmark) (Republic of Ireland)	Arve Lossmann / Ib Olesen; D. B. Green / Tod Majury	15; 12	8; 15	15; 10
5	(Denmark) (Republic of Ireland)	Jørn Skaarup; Frank Peard	15; 2	15; 7
6	(Denmark) (Republic of Ireland)	Poul Holm; James Doyle	15; 4	15; 4
7	(Denmark) (Republic of Ireland)	Ib Olesen; Ken Diplock	15; 7	15; 4
8	(Denmark) (Republic of Ireland)	Preben Dabelsteen / Jørn Skaarup; D. B. Green / Tod Majury	15; 4	15; 4
9	(Denmark) (Republic of Ireland)	Arve Lossmann / Ib Olesen; Jim Fitzgibbon / Frank Peard	12; 15	15; 2	8; 15

England
9
Paris, France
15–16 December 1951

France
0

			1	2	3
1	(England) (France)	Kenneth Greasley; Henri Pellizza	15; 11	15; 7
2	(England) (France)	Noel Radford; Yves Baudoin	15; 2	15; 6
3	(England) (France)	Warwick Shute / Allan Renton; Michel Le Renard / Maurice Mathieu	15; 12	15; 4
4	(England) (France)	Kenneth Greasley / Harold Marsland; Henri Pellizza / Yves Baudoin	15; 5	15; 4
5	(England) (France)	Noel Radford; Henri Pellizza	15; 2	15; 5
6	(England) (France)	Kenneth Greasley; Yves Baudoin	15; 0	15; 8
7	(England) (France)	Harold Marsland; Paul Ailloud	15; 12	17; 14
8	(England) (France)	Warwick Shute / Allan Renton; Henri Pellizza / Yves Baudoin	15; 12	5; 15	15; 3
9	(England) (France)	Kenneth Greasley / Harold Marsland; Michel Le Renard / Maurice Mathieu	15; 2	15; 3

=== Semi-finals ===
Denmark
6
Copenhagen, Denmark
17–18 February 1952

Sweden
3

			1	2	3
1	(Denmark) (Sweden)	Poul Holm; Nils Jonson	3; 15	4; 15
2	(Denmark) (Sweden)	Jørn Skaarup; Inge Blomberg	15; 7	18; 13
3	(Denmark) (Sweden)	Poul Holm / Ole Jensen; Nils Jonson / Stellan Mohlin	18; 16	15; 10
4	(Denmark) (Sweden)	John Nygaard / Ib Olesen; Inge Blomberg / Knut Malmgren	15; 9	15; 9
5	(Denmark) (Sweden)	Jørn Skaarup; Nils Jonson	15; 9	17; 18	8; 15
6	(Denmark) (Sweden)	Jørgen Hansen; Inge Blomberg	12; 15	15; 12	6; 15
7	(Denmark) (Sweden)	Poul Holm; Inge Blomberg	15; 11	15; 2
8	(Denmark) (Sweden)	John Nygaard / Ib Olesen; Nils Jonson / Stellan Mohlin	8; 15	18; 17	15; 7
9	(Denmark) (Sweden)	Poul Holm / Ole Jensen; Inge Blomberg / Knut Malmgren	15; 12	15; 13

England
6
Nottingham, England
2–3 February 1952

Scotland
3

			1	2	3
1	(England) (Scotland)	Kenneth Greasley; Alastair Russell	5; 15	15; 9	6; 15
2	(England) (Scotland)	Noel Radford; Alastair McIntyre	15; 10	15; 10
3	(England) (Scotland)	Kenneth Greasley / Harold Marsland; Robert Hodge / W. A. Robinson	15; 11	7; 15	13; 15
4	(England) (Scotland)	Warwick Shute / Tom Wingfield; J.B. Leslie / J. C. McKay	15; 6	15; 5
5	(England) (Scotland)	Kenneth Greasley; Alastair McIntyre	15; 7	15; 9
6	(England) (Scotland)	Harold Marsland; W. A. Robinson	15; 7	15; 11	16
7	(England) (Scotland)	Noel Radford; Alastair Russell	7; 15	3; 15
8	(England) (Scotland)	Kenneth Greasley / Harold Marsland; J.B. Leslie / J. C. McKay	15; 11	15; 5
9	(England) (Scotland)	Warwick Shute / Tom Wingfield; Robert Hodge / W. A. Robinson	10; 15	15; 7	15; 11

=== Final ===
Denmark
9
Copenhagen, Denmark
18–19 March 1952

England
0

			1	2	3
1	(Denmark) (England)	Poul Holm; Kenneth Greasley	15; 13	15; 10
2	(Denmark) (England)	Jørn Skaarup; Noel Radford	15; 1	15; 6
3	(Denmark) (England)	John Nygaard / Ib Olesen; Anthony D. Jordan / Harold Marsland	18; 15	15; 6
4	(Denmark) (England)	Poul Holm / Ole Jensen; Warwick Shute / Tom Wingfield	15; 11	15; 8
5	(Denmark) (England)	Jørgen Hansen; Tom Wingfield	15; 7	15; 11
6	(Denmark) (England)	Poul Holm; Noel Radford	15; 8	15; 2
7	(Denmark) (England)	Jørn Skaarup; Kenneth Greasley	15; 4	15; 5
8	(Denmark) (England)	John Nygaard / Ib Olesen; Warwick Shute / Tom Wingfield	15; 6	18; 13
9	(Denmark) (England)	Poul Holm / Ole Jensen; Anthony D. Jordan / Harold Marsland	18; 15	15; 7
