= 1949 Thomas Cup qualification =

Tournament details
- Dates: 3 November 1948 – 21 January 1949
- Location: American zone: Toronto; Pasadena; European zone: Copenhagen; Ilford; Leicester

The qualifying process for the 1949 Thomas Cup took place from 3 November 1948 to 21 January 1949 to decide the final teams which will play in the final tournament.

== Qualification process ==
The qualification process is divided into three regions, the Pacific Zone, the American Zone and the European Zone. Teams in their respective zone will compete in a knockout format. Teams will compete for two days, with two singles and doubles played on the first day and three singles and two doubles played on the next day. The teams that win their respective zone will earn a place in the final tournament to be held in Preston, Lancashire, England.

Since Australia and New Zealand did not enter their region of qualification, Malaya automatically qualified for the final tournament. The other teams that declined their participation from the qualification rounds are Belgium, Mexico and Norway.

=== Qualified teams ===
Country	Qualified as	Qualified on	Final appearance
Malaya	Sole representative of the Pacific Zone	3 November 1948	1st
United States	American Zone winners	13 December 1948	1st
Denmark	European Zone winners	21 January 1949	1st

== American Zone ==
=== Bracket ===
Semi-finals
5 December 1948 – Toronto
Canada	7
India	2
Bye
United States

Final
13 December 1948 – Pasadena
Canada	1
United States	8

=== Semi-finals ===
Canada
7
Toronto, Canada
5 – 6 December 1948

India
2

			1	2	3
1	(Canada) (India)	Richard Birch; George Lewis	15; 7	17; 14
2	(Canada) (India)	T. Darryl Thompson; Henry Ferreira	5; 15	15; 12	15; 7
3	(Canada) (India)	Richard Birch / Gordon Simpson; Bala Ullah / Dattu Mugve	5; 15	18; 16	15; 5
4	(Canada) (India)	Ted Pollock / Roy Smith; George Lewis / Devinder Mohan	9; 15	13; 16
5	(Canada) (India)	John Samis; Devinder Mohan	4; 15	15; 7	15; 10
6	(Canada) (India)	Richard Birch; Devinder Mohan	15; 9	7; 15	14; 17
7	(Canada) (India)	John Samis; George Lewis	15; 9	15; 10
8	(Canada) (India)	Ted Pollock / Roy Smith; Bala Ullah / Dattu Mugve	15; 7	15; 9
9	(Canada) (India)	Richard Birch / Gordon Simpson; George Lewis / Devinder Mohan	15; 3	5; 15	15; 10

=== Final ===
United States
8
Pasadena, California, United States
12 – 13 December 1948

Canada
1

			1	2	3
1	(United States) (Canada)	David G. Freeman; Richard Birch	15; 4	15; 3
2	(United States) (Canada)	Marten Mendez; John Samis	15; 1	15; 5
3	(United States) (Canada)	David G. Freeman / Wynn Rogers; Richard Birch / Gordon Simpson	9; 15	8; 15
4	(United States) (Canada)	Clinton Stephens / Bob Williams; Ted Pollock / Roy Smith	15; 8	15; 6
5	(United States) (Canada)	Marten Mendez; Richard Birch	17; 18	15; 6	15; 4
6	(United States) (Canada)	Carl Loveday; T. Darryl Thompson	15; 9	15; 7
7	(United States) (Canada)	Marten Mendez; John Samis	15; 6	15; 10
8	(United States) (Canada)	David G. Freeman / Wynn Rogers; Ted Pollock / Roy Smith	17; 15	11; 15	15; 9
9	(United States) (Canada)	Clinton Stephens / Bob Williams; Richard Birch / Gordon Simpson	15; 8	15; 8

== European Zone ==
=== Bracket ===
First round
France
Bye
4 December 1948 – Leicester
Scotland	1
England	8
3 November 1948 – Copenhagen
Denmark	9
Ireland	0
Sweden
Bye

Semi-finals
5 January 1949 – Ilford
France	0
England	9
8 December 1948 – Copenhagen
Denmark	9
Sweden	0

Final
21 January 1949 – Copenhagen
England	0
Denmark	9

=== First round ===
Denmark
9
Copenhagen, Denmark
3–4 November 1948

Ireland
0

			1	2	3
1	(Denmark) (Republic of Ireland)	Jørn Skaarup; Jim Fitzgibbon	15; 10	15; 5
2	(Denmark) (Republic of Ireland)	Poul Holm; Frank Peard	15; 3	15; 2
3	(Denmark) (Republic of Ireland)	Erik Frils / Poul Holm; Thomas Boyle / James Rankin	18; 15	15; 9
4	(Denmark) (Republic of Ireland)	Preben Dabelsteen / Jørn Skaarup; D. B. Green / Tod Majury	15; 12	15; 12
5	(Denmark) (Republic of Ireland)	Knud Christensen; D. B. Green	15; 6	15; 8
6	(Denmark) (Republic of Ireland)	Jørn Skaarup; Frank Peard	15; 3	15; 2
7	(Denmark) (Republic of Ireland)	Poul Holm; Jim Fitzgibbon	15; 4	15; 1
8	(Denmark) (Republic of Ireland)	Preben Dabelsteen / Jørn Skaarup; Thomas Boyle / James Rankin	15; 6	15; 7
9	(Denmark) (Republic of Ireland)	Erik Frils / Poul Holm; D. B. Green / Tod Majury	15; 6	15; 7

England
8
Leicester, England
4–5 December 1948

Scotland
1

			1	2	3
1	(England) (Scotland)	Harold Marsland; D. Leslie	15; 4	15; 10
2	(England) (Scotland)	Noel Radford; Murdoc McLean	15; 9	15; 7
3	(England) (Scotland)	Ralph Nichols / K. L. Wilson; J. C. McKay / Edward Wilson	15; 3	15; 11
4	(England) (Scotland)	Harold Marsland / Warwick Shute; D. L. Bloomer / I. McLean	15; 6	15; 4
5	(England) (Scotland)	Harold Marsland; Murdoc McLean	15; 8	15; 6
6	(England) (Scotland)	Tom Wingfield; Alastair McIntyre	18; 13	7; 15	16; 17
7	(England) (Scotland)	Noel Radford; D. Leslie	15; 4	15; 6
8	(England) (Scotland)	Ralph Nichols / K. L. Wilson; D. L. Bloomer / Murdoc McLean	15; 7	12; 15	15; 0
9	(England) (Scotland)	Harold Marsland / Warwick Shute; J. C. McKay / Edward Wilson	15; 4	15; 7

=== Semi-finals ===
Denmark
9
Copenhagen, Denmark
8–9 December 1948

Sweden
0

			1	2	3
1	(Denmark) (Sweden)	Jørn Skaarup; Nils Jonson	15; 6	15; 3
2	(Denmark) (Sweden)	Mogens Felsby; Inge Blomberg	15; 8	15; 1
3	(Denmark) (Sweden)	Berge Frederiksen / Poul Holm; Nils Jonson / Knut Malmgren	15; 8	15; 8
4	(Denmark) (Sweden)	Preben Dabelsteen / Jørn Skaarup; Helge Paulsen / Bengt Polling	15; 5	15; 7
5	(Denmark) (Sweden)	Mogens Felsby; Nils Jonson	15; 2	15; 7
6	(Denmark) (Sweden)	Jørn Skaarup; Inge Blomberg	15; 2	18; 15
7	(Denmark) (Sweden)	Berge Frederiksen; Knut Malmgren	15; 4	4; 15	18; 16
8	(Denmark) (Sweden)	Berge Frederiksen / Poul Holm; Helge Paulsen / Bengt Polling	15; 7	17; 15
9	(Denmark) (Sweden)	Preben Dabelsteen / Jørn Skaarup; Inge Blomberg / Knut Malmgren	15; 0	12; 15	15; 4

England
9
Ilford, England
5–6 January 1949

France
0

			1	2	3
1	(England) (France)	Harold Marsland; Henri Pellizza	15; 7	15; 4
2	(England) (France)	Noel Radford; Yves Baudoin	15; 0	15; 0
3	(England) (France)	Harold Marsland / Warwick Shute; Henri Pellizza / Yves Baudoin	15; 3	15; 7
4	(England) (France)	Noel Radford / K. L. Wilson; Michel Le Renard / Michel Marret	15; 2	15; 3
5	(England) (France)	Harold Marsland; Yves Baudoin	15; 2	15; 5
6	(England) (France)	Noel Radford; Henri Pellizza	15; 4	15; 0
7	(England) (France)	Tom Wingfield; E. Maillot	15; 3	15; 3
8	(England) (France)	Noel Radford / K. L. Wilson; Henri Pellizza / Yves Baudoin	15; 2	15; 8
9	(England) (France)	Harold Marsland / Warwick Shute; Michel Le Renard / Michel Marret	15; 1	15; 0

=== Final ===
Denmark
9
Copenhagen, Denmark
21–22 January 1949

England
0

			1	2	3
1	(Denmark) (England)	Jørn Skaarup; Noel Radford	15; 0	15; 4
2	(Denmark) (England)	Mogens Felsby; Harold Marsland	15; 8	15; 0
3	(Denmark) (England)	Preben Dabelsteen / Jørn Skaarup; Ralph Nichols / K. L. Wilson	15; 1	15; 9
4	(Denmark) (England)	Berge Frederiksen / Ib Olesen; Harold Marsland / Warwick Shute	15; 9	15; 4
5	(Denmark) (England)	Mogens Felsby; Noel Radford	15; 6	15; 6
6	(Denmark) (England)	Jørn Skaarup; Harold Marsland	15; 2	15; 0
7	(Denmark) (England)	Knud Christensen; Tom Wingfield	15; 5	15; 8
8	(Denmark) (England)	Berge Frederiksen / Ib Olesen; Ralph Nichols / K. L. Wilson	15; 17	15; 5	15; 8
9	(Denmark) (England)	Preben Dabelsteen / Jørn Skaarup; Harold Marsland / Warwick Shute	15; 5	15; 8
