= 1949 All England Badminton Championships =

1949 All England Championships
Tournament details
- Dates: 2 March 1949– 5 March 1949
- Edition: 39th
- Venue: Harringay Arena
- Location: London

The 1949 All England Championships was a badminton tournament held at the Harringay Arena, London, England, from 2–5 March 1949.

== Final results ==
Category	Winners	Runners-up	Score
Men's singles	(United States) Dave Freeman	(Malaysia) Ooi Teik Hock	15–1, 15–6
Women's singles	(Denmark) Aase Schiøtt Jacobsen	(Denmark) Aase Svendsen	8–11, 11–8, 11–4
Men's doubles	(Malaysia) Ooi Teik Hock & Teoh Seng Khoon	(United States) Dave Freeman & Wynn Rogers	15–5, 15–6
Women's doubles	(England) Queenie Allen & Betty Uber	(Denmark) Tonny Ahm & Kirsten Thorndahl	15–8, 15–10
Mixed doubles	(United States) Clinton Stephens & Patsey Stephens	(United States) Wynn Rogers & (England) Queenie Allen	15–5, 2–15, 15–12

== Men's singles ==
=== Section 1 ===
Second round
(United States) Dave Freeman +	15	15
(United States) Wynn Rogers	10	2
(India) Henry Ferreira	15	15
(England) Tom Wingfield	13	9
(Sweden) Olle Wahlberg	15	15
(England) N L Williams	9	4
(Republic of Ireland) Frank Peard	15	15
(England) D S Kumana	10	10
(Malaysia) Wong Peng Soon +	15	15
(England) H Dart	0	2
(Denmark) Preben Dabelsteen	15	15
(England) H L K Brock	5	9
(India) Devinder Mohan Lal +	15	15
(England) Warwick Shute	0	7
(United States) Bob Williams	12	15	15
(England) Peter Birtwhistle	15	6	12

Third finals
(United States) Freeman	15	15
(India) Ferreira	13	3
(Sweden) Wahlberg	15	8	15
(Republic of Ireland) Peard	11	15	8
(Malaysia) Peng Soon	15	15
(Denmark) Dabelsteen	1	3
(India) Mohan Lal	14	15	15
(United States) Williams	18	5	7

Quarterfinals
(United States) Freeman	15	15
(Sweden) Wahlberg	2	2
(Malaysia) Peng Soon	15	14	15
(India) Mohan Lal	4	17	4

Semifinals
(United States) Freeman	15	15
(Malaysia) Peng Soon	2	4

=== Section 2 ===
Second round
(Malaysia) Ooi Teik Hock +	15	15
(Sweden) Inge Blomberg	5	2
(Denmark) Ole Jensen	15	15
(England) A L Salway	1	5
(India) George Lewis	15	15
(Denmark) Knud Christensen	8	7
(Malaysia) Lim Kee Fong	15	17
(United States) Marten Mendez +	11	15
(United States) Carl Loveday	15	15
(England) Noel Radford	3	5
(Denmark) Jørn Skaarup +	15	15
(Scotland) James Mackay	5	12
(Malaysia) Law Teik Hock	15	15
(India) B V Ullal	2	1
(Sweden) Nils Jonson +	15	18
(United States) H G Loveday	8	16

Third finals
(Malaysia) Ooi Teik Hock	15	15
(Denmark) Jensen	7	8
(India) Lewis	18	15
(Malaysia) Lim Kee Fong	15	13
(United States) Loveday	15	15
(Denmark) Skaarup	1	3
(Malaysia) Law Teik Hock	12	15	15
(Sweden) Jonson	15	6	12

Quarterfinals
(Malaysia) Ooi Teik Hock	15	9	17
(India) Lewis	3	15	15
(United States) Loveday	12	15	15
(Malaysia) Law Teik Hock	15	6	12

Semifinals
(Malaysia) Ooi Teik Hock	15	15
(United States) Loveday	6	5

+Denotes Seed

== Women's singles ==
=== Section 1 ===
First round
(Denmark) Aase Schiøtt Jacobsen +	bye
(England) M J Barnett	bye
(England) Elizabeth O'Beirne	bye
(England) E Potter	bye
(Denmark) Kirsten Thorndahl +	bye
(United States) Patsey Stephens	bye
(England) Betty Uber	bye
(England) P Askew	bye

Second round
(Denmark) Schiott-Jacobsen	11	11
(England) Barnett	6	5
(England) O'Beirne	11	11
(England) Potter	3	5
(Denmark) Thorndahl	11	11
(United States) Stephens	8	4
(England) Uber	6	11	11
(England) Askew	11	1	3

Quarterfinals
(Denmark) Schiott-Jacobsen	11	11
(England) O'Beirne	2	2
(Denmark) Thorndahl	4	12	11
(England) Uber	12	10	9

Semifinals
(Denmark) Schiott-Jacobsen	12	11
(Denmark) Thorndahl	9	4

=== Section 2 ===
First round
(Denmark) Aase Svendsen +	bye
(England) M Robinson	bye
(England) Queenie Allen	11	2	11
(England) Audrey Stone	7	11	4
(Scotland) Nancy Horner	bye
(Denmark) Tonny Ahm +	bye
(England) Mavis Henderson	bye
(Denmark) A Lehmeier	bye
(England) Madge Alcorn	bye

Second round
(Denmark) Svendsen	11	11
(England) Robinson	4	11
(England) Allen	11	11
(Scotland) Horner	2	7
(Denmark) Ahm	11	11
(England) Henderson	4	4
(Denmark) Lehmeier	11	11
(England) Alcorn	3	4

Quarterfinals
(Denmark) Svendsen	11	11
(England) Allen	8	1
(Denmark) Ahm	11	11
(Denmark) Lehmeier	5	4

Semifinals
(Denmark) Svendsen	12	11
(Denmark) Ahm	9	6
