= Patricia Stephens =

Patricia Stephens may refer to:

- Patricia Stephens Due (1939–2012), African-American civil rights activist
- Patricia Stephens (badminton) (1928–2016), American badminton player
