= U.S. National Badminton Championships =

Annual tournament

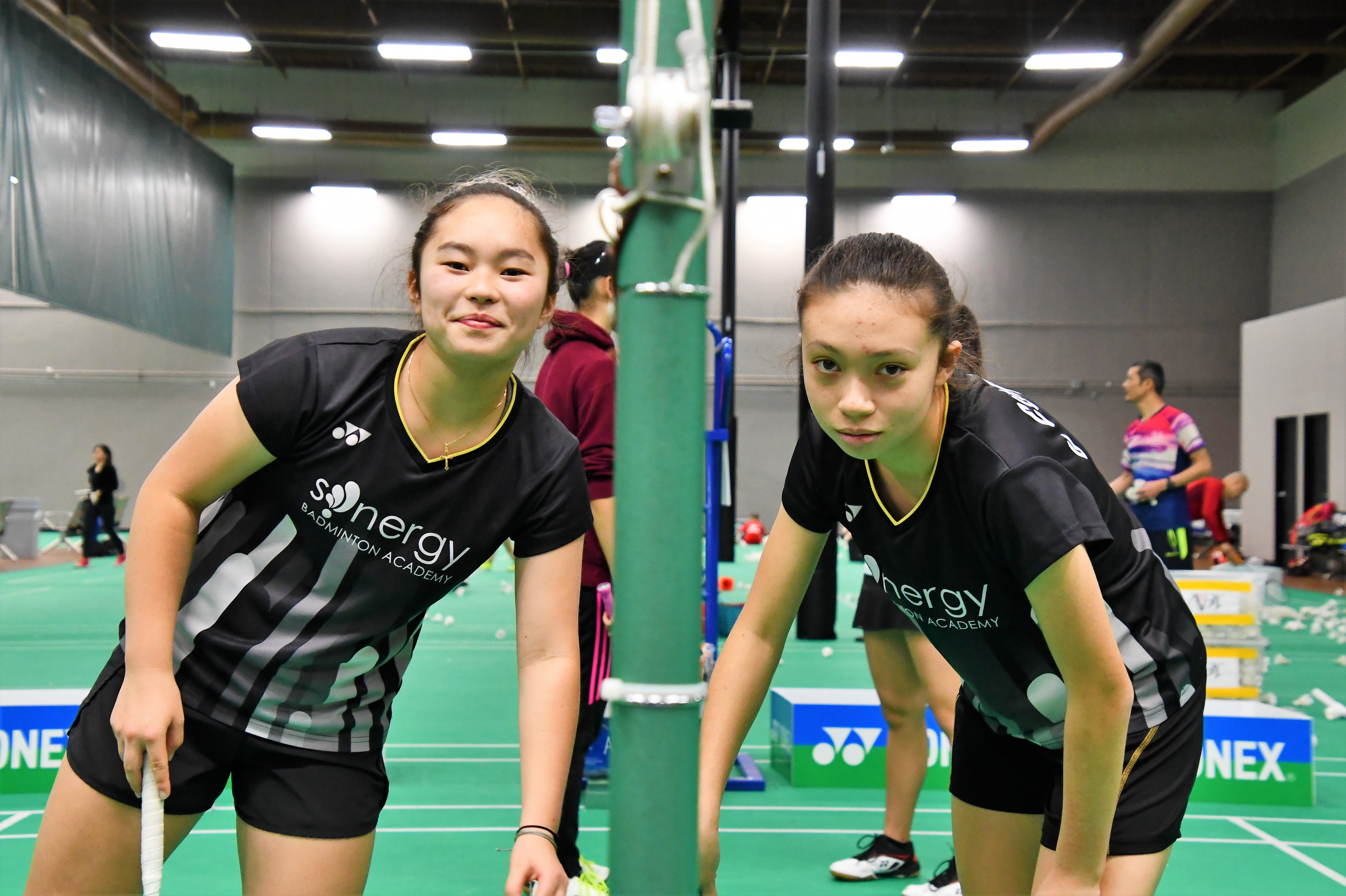
U.S. National Badminton Championships 2019

The U.S. National Badminton Championships is a tournament organized by USA Badminton (originally the American Badminton Association) and held annually to crown the best badminton players in the United States.

The tournament started in Chicago in 1937. Currently, all participants must be U.S. citizens or have resided in the United States in the preceding 12 months. There is also a separate U.S. Open Badminton Championships which is open to foreign competitors. The history of the two tournaments is rather complicated. Prior to 1954 all U.S. Badminton Championships had a "closed" format with only U.S. citizens and residents eligible to compete. From 1954 through 1969 the tournament was open to foreign competition. Between 1970 and 1976 the format fluctuated. Both a closed and an open tournament were held from 1970 through 1972; an open tournament was held in 1973; a closed tournament was held in 1974 and 1975; and both a closed and an open tournament were held again in 1976. From 1977 through 1982 all U.S. national championships were closed. Since 1983 both a closed and an open tournament have generally been held at separate times in the season (the previous closed/open tourneys had been held contiguously). The following table lists only the winners of the closed U.S. National Badminton Championships.

== Past winners ==
Year	Men's singles	Women's singles	Men's doubles	Women's doubles	Mixed doubles
1937	Walter R. Kramer	Bertha Barkhuff	Don Eversoll; Chester Goss	Bertha Barkhuff; Zoe Smith	Hamilton B. Law; Bertha Barkhuff
1938	Walter R. Kramer	Bertha Barkhuff	Hamilton B. Law; Richard O. Yeager	Helen Gibson; Wanda Bergman	Hamilton B. Law; Bertha Barkhuff
1939	David G. Freeman	Mary E. Whittemore	Hamilton B. Law; Richard O. Yeager	Bertha Barkhuff; Zoe Smith	Richard O. Yeager; Zoe Smith
1940	David G. Freeman	Evelyn Boldrick	David G. Freeman; Chester Goss	Elizabeth Anselm; Helen Zabriski Ough	David G. Freeman; Sara Lee Williams
1941	David G. Freeman	Thelma Kingsbury	David G. Freeman; Chester Goss	Thelma Kingsbury; Janet Wright	David G. Freeman; Sara Lee Williams
1942	David G. Freeman	Evelyn Boldrick	David G. Freeman; Chester Goss	Evelyn Boldrick; Janet Wright	David G. Freeman; Sara Lee Williams
1943 – 1946	No competition				
1947	David G. Freeman	Ethel Marshall	David G. Freeman; Webster Kimball	Thelma Kingsbury; Janet Wright	Wynn Rogers; Virginia Hill
1948	David G. Freeman	Ethel Marshall	David G. Freeman; Wynn Rogers	Thelma Scovil; Janet Wright	Clinton Stephens; Patricia Stephens
1949	Marten Mendez	Ethel Marshall	Barney McCay; Wynn Rogers	Thelma Scovil; Janet Wright	Wynn Rogers; Loma Moulton Smith
1950	Marten Mendez	Ethel Marshall	Barney McCay; Wynn Rogers	Thelma Scovil; Janet Wright	Wynn Rogers; Loma Moulton Smith
1951	Joseph Cameron Alston	Ethel Marshall	Joe Alston; Wynn Rogers	Dorothy Hann; Loma Moulton Smith	Wynn Rogers; Loma Moulton Smith
1952	Marten Mendez	Ethel Marshall	Joe Alston; Wynn Rogers	Ethel Marshall; Beatrice Massman	Wynn Rogers; Helen Tibbetts
1953	David G. Freeman	Ethel Marshall	Joe Alston; Wynn Rogers	Judy Devlin; Sue Devlin	Joe Alston; Lois Alston
1954 – 1969	See U.S. Open				
1970	Stan Hales	Tyna Barinaga	Don Paup; Jim Poole	Tyna Barinaga; Caroline Hein	Jim Poole; Tyna Barinaga
1971	Stan Hales	Diane Hales	Don Paup; Jim Poole	Caroline Hein; Carlene Starkey	Don Paup; Helen Tibbetts
1972	Chris Kinard	Pam Brady	Don Paup; Jim Poole	P. Bretzke; Pam Brady	Thomas Carmichael sen. Pam Brady
1973	See U.S. Open				
1974	Chris Kinard	Cindy Baker	Don Paup; Jim Poole	Pam Brady; Diane Hales	Mike Walker; Judianne Kelly
1975	Mike Adams	Judianne Kelly	Don Paup; Jim Poole	Diane Hales; Carlene Starkey	Mike Walker; Judianne Kelly
1976	Chris Kinard	Pam Brady	Don Paup; Bruce Pontow	Pam Brady; Rosine Lemon	Mike Walker; Judianne Kelly
1977	Chris Kinard	Pam Brady	Jim Poole; Mike Walker	Diana Osterhues; Janet Wilts	Bruce Pontow; Pam Brady
1978	Mike Walker	Cheryl Carton	John Britton; Charles Coakley	Diana Osterhues; Janet Wilts	Bruce Pontow; Pam Brady
1979	Chris Kinard	Pam Brady	Jim Poole; Mike Walker	Pam Brady; Judianne Kelly	Mike Walker; Judianne Kelly
1980	Gary Higgins	Cheryl Carton	Matt Fogarty; Mike Walker	Pam Brady; Judianne Kelly	Mike Walker; Judianne Kelly
1981	Chris Kinard	Utami Kinard	John Britton; Gary Higgins	Pam Brady; Judianne Kelly	Danny Brady; Pam Brady
1982	Gary Higgins	Cheryl Carton	Don Paup; Bruce Pontow	Pam Brady; Judianne Kelly	Danny Brady; Pam Brady
1983	Rodney Barton	Cheryl Carton	John Britton; Gary Higgins	Pam Brady; Judianne Kelly	Mike Walker; Judianne Kelly
1984	Rodney Barton	Cheryl Carton	Matt Fogarty; Bruce Pontow	Pam Brady; Monica Ortez	John Britton; Cheryl Carton
1985	Chris Jogis	Judianne Kelly	John Britton; Gary Higgins	Pam Brady; Judianne Kelly	Mike Walker; Judianne Kelly
1986	Chris Jogis	Nina Lolk	Matt Fogarty; Bruce Pontow	Linda French; Nina Lolk	Mike Walker; Judianne Kelly
1987	Tariq Wadood	Joy Kitzmiller	Chris Jogis; Benny Lee	Linda French; Nina Lolk	Chris Jogis; Linda French
1988	Chris Jogis	Joy Kitzmiller	Chris Jogis; Benny Lee	Linda French; Linda Safarik-Tong	Chris Jogis; Linda French
1989	Tariq Wadood	Linda Safarik-Tong	Chris Jogis; Benny Lee	Linda French; Linda Safarik-Tong	Tariq Wadood; Linda French
1990	Chris Jogis	Linda Safarik-Tong	Chris Jogis; Benny Lee	Ann French; Joy Kitzmiller	Tom Reidy; Traci Britton
1991	Chris Jogis	Liz Aronsohn	John Britton; Tom Reidy	Ann French; Joy Kitzmiller	Tariq Wadood; Traci Britton
1992	Chris Jogis	Joy Kitzmiller	Benny Lee; Tom Reidy	Ann French; Joy Kitzmiller	Andy Chong; Linda French
1993	Andy Chong	Andrea Andersson	Benny Lee; Tom Reidy	Andrea Andersson; Traci Britton	Andy Chong; Linda French
1994	Kevin Han	Joy Kitzmiller	Benny Lee; Tom Reidy	Andrea Andersson; Liz Aronsohn	Andy Chong; Linda French
1995	Kevin Han	Andrea Andersson	Benny Lee; Tom Reidy	Andrea Andersson; Liz Aronsohn	Andy Chong; Linda French
1996	Steve Butler	Zhao Ye Ping	Kevin Han; Tom Reidy	Ann French; Kathy Zimmerman	Andy Chong; Zhao Ye Ping
1997	Kevin Han	Cindy Shi	Kevin Han; Tom Reidy	Cindy Shi; Zhao Ye Ping	Trisna Gunadi; Eileen Tang
1998	Kevin Han	Yeping Tang	Andy Chong; Benny Lee	Cindy Shi; Yeping Tang	Andy Chong; Yeping Tang
1999	Kevin Han	Yeping Tang	Kevin Han; Alex Liang	Cindy Shi; Yeping Tang	Andy Chong; Yeping Tang
2000	Alex Liang	Yeping Tang	Matt Fogarty; Wu Chibing	Janis Tan; Elie Wu	Wu Chibing; Melinda Keszthelyi
2001	Kevin Han	Meiluawati	Howard Bach; Kevin Han	Cindy Shi; Meiluawati	Trisna Gunadi; Janis Tan
2002	Kevin Han	Meiluawati	Howard Bach; Kevin Han	Janis Tan; Elie Wu	Andy Chong; Szilvia Szombati
2003	Howard Bach	Meiluawati	Tony Gunawan; Khan Malaythong	Meiluawati; Etty Tantri	Raju Rai; Etty Tantri
2004	Raju Rai	Lili Zhou	Howard Bach; Kevin Han	Peng Yun; Lili Zhou	Raju Rai; Eva Lee
2005	Raju Rai	Eva Lee	Howard Bach; Khan Malaythong	Eva Lee; Mesinee Mangkalakiri	Khan Malaythong; Mesinee Mangkalakiri
2006	Raju Rai	Eva Lee	Howard Bach; Khan Malaythong	Lee Joo-hyun; Peng Yun	Howard Bach; Eva Lee
2007	Howard Bach	Lee Joo-hyun	Howard Bach; Khan Malaythong	Peng Yun; Lee Joo-hyun	Howard Bach; Eva Lee
2008	Raju Rai	Lee Joo-hyun	Howard Bach; Khan Malaythong	Mona Santoso; Lee Joo-hyun	Kowi Chandra; Mona Santoso
2009	Howard Bach	Lee Joo-hyun	Howard Bach; Khan Malaythong	Mona Santoso; Lee Joo-hyun	Howard Bach; Eva Lee
2010	Hock Lai Lee	Eva Lee	Howard Bach; Raju Rai	Peng Yun; Lee Joo-hyun	Howard Bach; Eva Lee
2011	Ilian Perez	Cee Nantana Ketpura	Howard Bach; Tony Gunawan	Peng Yun; Lee Joo-hyun	Halim Haryanto Ho; Eva Lee
2012	Sattawat Pongnairat	Bo Rong	Kowi Chandra; Halim Haryanto Ho	Peng Yun; Lee Joo-hyun	Peng Yun; Holvy de Pauw
2013	Hock Lai Lee	Jamie Subandhi	Christian Christianto; Tony Gunawan	Eva Lee; Paula Lynn Obañana	Howard Bach; Eva Lee
2014	Howard Shu	Beiwen Zhang	Mu He; Sarun Vivatpatanakul	Jing Yu Hong; Beiwen Zhang	Mu He; Jing Yu Hong
2015	Sittichai Viboonsin	Beiwen Zhang	Holvy de Pauw; Sittichai Viboonsin	Jing Yu Hong; Beiwen Zhang	Halim Haryanto; Jing Yu Hong
2016	Charles Gu	Beiwen Zhang	Mu He; Ricky Liuzhou	Jing Yu Hong; Beiwen Zhang	Phillip Chew; Jamie Subandhi
2017	Mark Alcala	Jamie Subandhi	Holvy de Pauw; Sittichai Viboonsin	Mónika Szőke; Tantaree Treeratanakuljarut	Mark Alcala; Jamie Subandhi
2018	Pandu Dewantoro	Jamie Subandhi	Aries Delos Santos; Gabriel Villanueva	Jing Yu Hong; Jamie Subandhi	Yoga Pratama; Jamie Subandhi
2019	Darren Yang	Esther Shi	Phillip Chew; Ryan Chew	Francesca Corbett; Allison Lee	Vinson Chiu; Jamie Subandhi
2020	not held				
2021	Don Henley Averia	Jennie Gai	Vinson Chiu; Joshua Yuan	Jennie Gai; Sanchita Pandey	Ryan Zheng; Sanchita Pandey
