= Stanley Kratkowski =

American weightlifter (1912–1962)

Stanley Joseph Kratkowski (August 20, 1912 – August 25, 1962) was an American weightlifter who competed in the 1932 Summer Olympics and in the 1936 Summer Olympics.

== Career ==
Kratkowski competed as a middle weight at 165 pounds.

== Accomplishments ==
In 1932 he finished fifth in the middleweight class. Four years later he finished again fifth in the middleweight class at the 1936 Games. Regardless, Kratkowski was a two time Olympian.

In 1934, Kratkowski held the Right Hand Swing Record at 178 1/2 pounds. The modern All-Round Association world record for this lift is 172.6 pounds in his weight class.

In 1936, Kratkowski was honored by the City of Detroit as part of the first Champions Day, celebrating noted athletes from Detroit and Michigan. The Banquet was held on April 18, 1936.
