= Champions Day =

1936 sports commemoration in Detroit, Michigan

Champions Day (also known as "Day of Champions" or "City of Champions Day") is a special day that was set aside in 1936 to commemorate a number of sporting victories and accomplishments by Detroit, Michigan natives and teams in the early 1930s, and especially the 1935–36 sports season. This season was called "...the most amazing sweep of sport achievements ever credited to any single city" by the Windsor Daily Star. This sports season featured, among other things, the rise of Joe Louis in the professional boxing world, the Detroit Tigers winning their first World Series, the Detroit Lions winning their first NFL championship, and the Detroit Red Wings winning their first NHL championship.

April 18 was designated Champions Day in Michigan by the state Governor Frank Fitzgerald, and then specifically for Detroit by the Detroit City Council. Governor Fitzgerald, who is referred to as an enthusiastic sport fan by the Grosse Pointe Review, urged citizens "to pay tribute to the heroes of the sport world who have brought honor and glory to the State and Detroit."

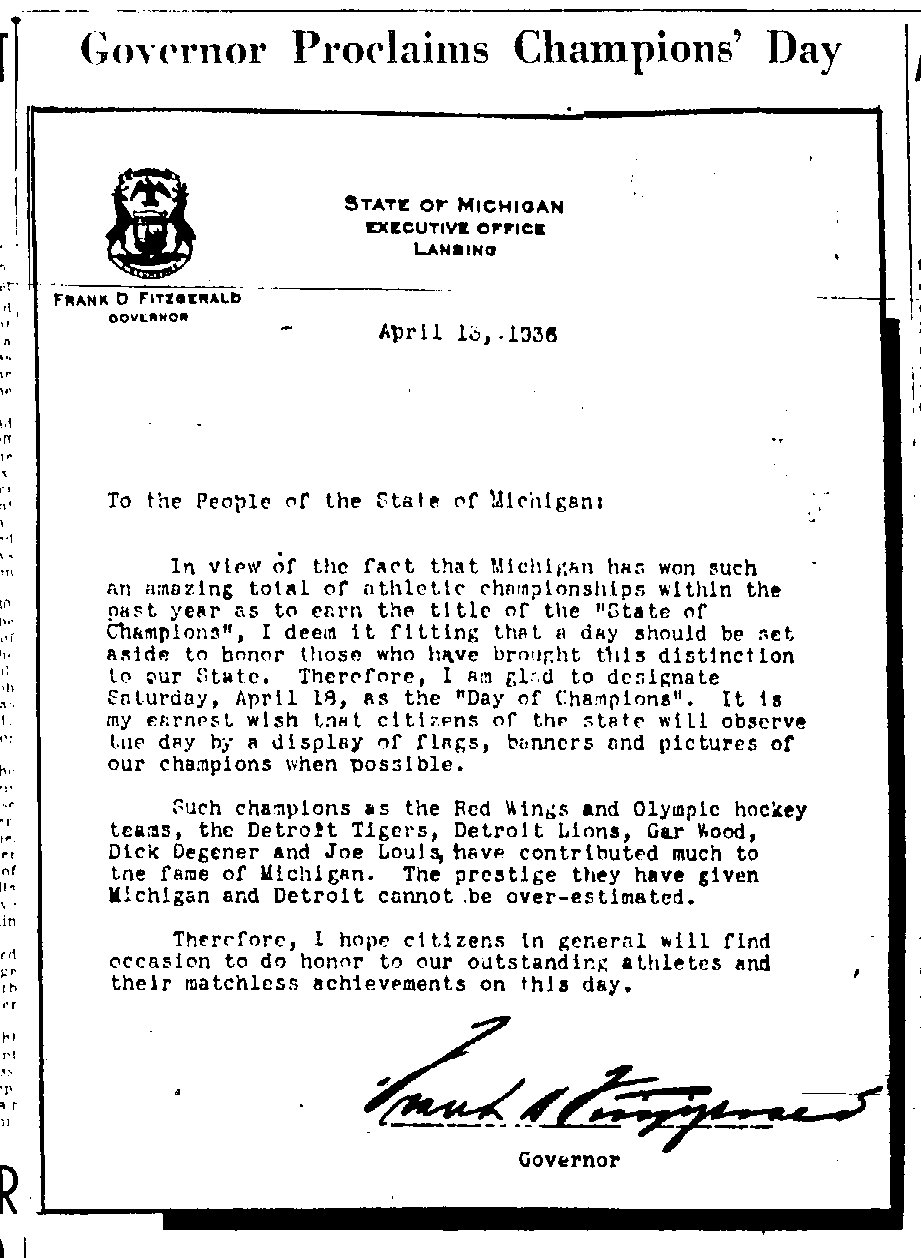
Governor Fitzgerald's Proclamation Letter

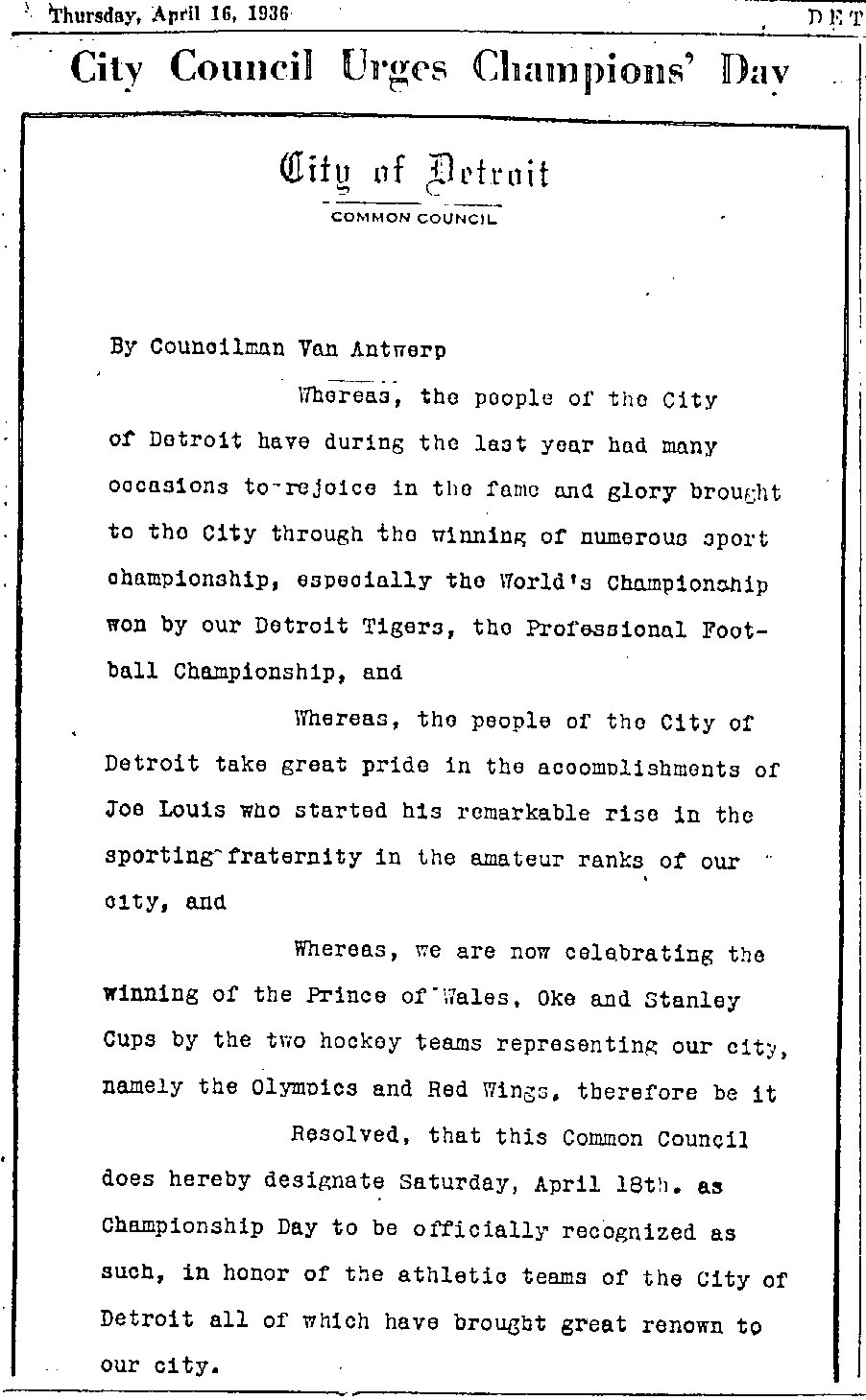
Detroit City Council Proclaims Champions Day

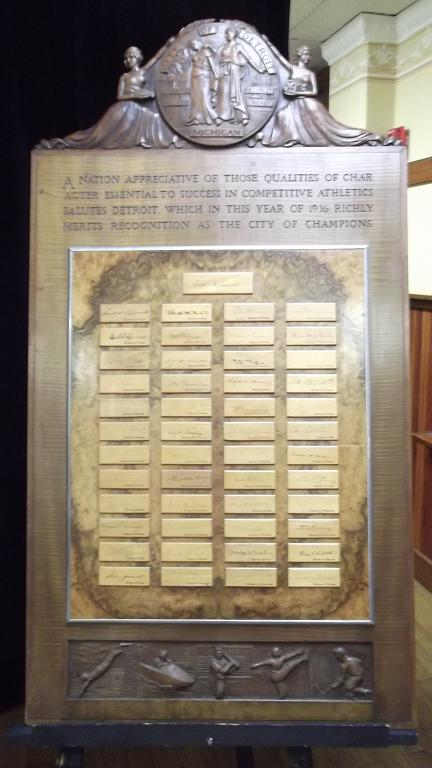
Plaque featuring President FDR's signature as well as the signatures of the Governors of all 48 states in 1936

== City of Champions banquet ==
The Detroit Times planned a "testimonial" dinner for all the city's Champions to be held that first Champions day. They began selling tickets as early as April 6. A ticket for the dinner cost $3. Ads for the dinner indicated that "The banquet will honor all of Detroit's champions, including the Detroit Tigers, Red Wings, Olympics, Joe Louis, Detroit Lions and a score of individual titleholders."

The party was held at the Detroit Masonic Temple. Over 600 fans attended the paid event. Manila "Bud" Shaver, sports editor of the Detroit Times, emceed the event. The celebration was broadcast on the radio station WXYZ-AM in Detroit. Many of the athletes from the team sports gave speeches at the event, however Joe Louis did not speak. Governor Fitzgerald also spoke at the banquet.

The major three sports teams were well represented at the party. The baseball season had just started and the Tigers were in the middle of a home series with April 18 an off day so many of the Tigers were able to appear. Also attending were a large number of Red Wings who were still in town having just completed their championship drive. Finally, despite the festivities falling in the middle of off season for football, a number of Lions traveled hundreds, even thousands, of miles to attend the Banquet.

Also attending the dinner were Joseph Carr, president of the NFL and Frank Calder, president of the NHL, Councilmen and the Mayor of Detroit.

== Capitol of Sports Gala (Radio Program) ==
On Sunday, April 19, 1936, Radio Stations WJR and WSPD broadcast a half-hour-long program dramatizing the events that crowned each of Detroit's champions: "The thrilling ninth inning of the Tiger-Cub final World Series game; the Lions victory over the New York Giants; Louis' battle with Max Baer and the final game in the Stanley Cup series between the Red Wings and Toronto Maple Leafs..." Jimmie Stevenson, chief sports announcer of WJR was master of ceremonies. Samuel Benavie conducted an augmented orchestra to provide musical background.

After each dramatization representatives of each branch of the sport spoke: "Mickey Cochrane, manager of the Tigers; Potsy Clark, coach of the Lions; Jack Adams, manager of the Red Wings; Wally Kilrea, representing Donnie Hughes, youthful boss of the Olympics; [Joe] Louis and [Dick] Degener."

The Toledo News-Bee said this about the program: "Never before in the history of radio have so many famous characters been assembled for one kaleidoscopic broadcast. This will be the champion of sports programs."

== City of Champions ==
Because of the many sporting accomplishments during this time frame, Detroit was given the nickname "City of Champions" by many in the media.

A wood plaque was also presented to the city by the White House on July 16, 8:00 pm in Traverse City during the 1936 Cherry Festival. The plaque bears the signatures of President Franklin D. Roosevelt as well as the Governors of all the states in the union (48 at the time). Presenting the plaque was Michigan governor Fitzgerald and accepting on behalf of the city was John W. Smith, president of the Detroit Council. Also participating in the ceremony was Walter O. Briggs, Jr., (front office executive of the Tigers), Louis Giffels (Red Wings player), and Tommy Emmet (Lions' public relations director). The plaque bears the inscription: "A nation appreciative of those qualities of character essential to success in competitive athletics salutes Detroit, which in this year of 1936 richly merits recognition as the City of Champions." The presentation was broadcast over a national radio chain. The inscription was authored by Harold Titus.

The plaque has figures at the bottom representing a diver (Degener), a power boat racer (Wood), a baseball player (Tigers), a football player (Lions), and a hockey player (Red Wings and Olympics). Originally a boxer, representing Joe Louis, was planned to appear on it. However, following Louis's unexpected loss to Max Schmeling June 19, the image of the prize fighter was removed and replaced with the diver.

No other city has won the championship games/series for three of the four major North American sports the same sports season. New York did hold the NFL, MLB, and NHL championships in 1927, but at the time there was no NFL championship game. The championship was determined just on regular season wins and losses.

== Events commemorated ==
There were a number of individual and team accomplishment during this time, including:

- 1931: Gar Wood wins the Harmsworth Cup for unlimited power boat racing
- 1932: Eddie "Midnight Express" Tolan wins two gold medals in the Olympics for sprinting
- 1934: Newell Banks crowned World Checkers Champion
- 1934, December: Stroh's bowling team would win American Bowling Congress, International, and world's match game titles. The Team would also be noted national match champions in 1935. They would be invited and appear at the banquet.
- 1935: Joe Louis bursts onto the national boxing scene and is "popularly regarded as [the] uncrowned heavyweight boxing titlist."
- 1935, February: Azucar, a horse owned by Detroiter Fred M. Alger Jr., wins the inaugural Santa Anita Handicap.
- 1935, March: Eddie Tolan wins 75-, 100-, and 220-yard events at the World Professional Sprint Championship.
- 1935, July 8: National AAU swim meet crowns Detroit natives Dirk Degener springboard diving champ, Jimmy Gilhula 220-yard free style champ, and Johnny Higgins 220-yard breast stroke champ. The Detroit Athletic Club won team championship.
- 1935, August 17: Gar Wood Jr wins national outboard sweepstakes regatta in Class A. He also set amateur speed records in Class A and Class C at this event.
- 1935, September: The Dixie Oils, a professional fast-pitch softball team, won "the George H. Sisler Trophy, emblematic of the championship of the United States."
- 1935, September: Detroit Police Dept. Officer Alfred Hemming wins national police pistol championship; Michigan State Trooper Carlos Hurley wins national revolver championship; Detroit Police Dept. wins the overall national pistol shooting championship.
- 1935, September: Miss Constance O'Donovan and Esther Challova Politzer, national double tennis champions.
- 1935, September 28–29: Walter Hagen captained the U.S. Ryder Cup to a 9–3 victory over the British.
- 1935, September 29: Herbert Mendelson, owner Team Notre Dame, wins the 1935 President's Cup in Washington D.C. for power boat racing.
- 1935, October 7: Detroit Tigers win their first World Series
- 1935, December 15: Detroit Lions win their first NFL Championship
- 1935, December 15: Joe Louis win the Associated Press "Most Outstanding Athlete of 1935."
- 1936, January: Henry B. Joy Jr. is noted as holding two national skeet shooting titles: Small bore and 20-gauge.
- 1936, February 28: Jacob Ankrom wins national amateur three cushion billiards title.
- 1936, April 11: Detroit Red Wings win their first Stanley Cup
- 1936, April 12: Detroit Olympics (minor league hockey) win their second consecutive IHL Championship.
- 1936, April 18: First Champions Day. Others honored at the party included:
  - Detroit Athletic Club outdoor swimming team captures the A.A.U. national championship.
  - Katherine Hughes-Hallett, 1935 Midwest fencing champion.
  - Clark Haskins, national A.A.U. 56-pound weight champion.
  - Dick Degener, "...recognized by many as the greatest [diver] of all time." 1932 Olympic Games high diving champion.
  - Tom Haynie, national medley swim champion.
  - Walter R. Kramer, rated No. 1 badminton player in the United States.
  - Stanley Kratkowski, A.A.U. Champion weight lifter.
  - Bill Bonthron, holder of the 1,500 meter world's track record.
  - Harry B. Joy Jr., National 20-gauge skeet shooting Champion, 1935.
  - William McCorquodale, National A.A.U. 112-pound boxing champion.
  - Jimmy Gilhula, National A.A.U. 220-yard free style swimming champion.

== Modern celebrations ==
Despite the excitement of the 1935–36 sports season in Detroit, Champions Day was not regularly recognized after the first event. In his book Detroit: City of Champions, author Charles Avison theorizes that World War II was a primary factor in this amazing story and holiday losing its prominence.

=== 2012 ===
In 2012 there was an effort to partially revive the holiday. On April 18, 2012, the Detroit Mayor's office 're-declared' April 18 as Champions Day and entrusted the Detroit Historical Society with hosting this event and future events.

On display at the ceremony were a number of artifacts related to the original Champions Day, "including a wood plaque presented to the city and signed by President Franklin Roosevelt and the governors of the United States in 1936 saluting Detroit as the City of Champions."

=== 2014 ===
A group calling itself "Detroit Champions" with help from the Detroit Drunken Historical Society attempted to restart celebration of this holiday with a series of events. They referred to the events collectively as "Champions Week," which overlaps the official holiday on April 18. The events were each held a different day:

- April 12 - Chug-a-Lug Pub Run: a run through Detroit stopping at 5 different historic bars.
- April 13 - Softball Scrimmage: a "friendly game of softball" held at what's left of Tiger Stadium, the long time home of the Detroit Tigers.
- April 14 - Garden Bowl: a night of bowling and social mixing at the Garden Bowl
- April 17 - Detroit Drunken Historical Society and Detroit Trivia Night: including a speech by author Charles Avison
- April 19 - Tailgate of Champions in Campus Martius: tailgating prior to the Detroit Tigers baseball game.

=== 2015 ===
Detroit Champions again planned and executed Champions Week in 2015. As in 2014, five events were planning around April 18:

- April 11 - Chug-a-Lug Pub Run: A 5-mile, 5-bar run.
- April 12 - Kick-off and Softball game: A Q&A session with author Charles Avison and Tom Derry, the founder of the Navin Field Grounds Crew, followed by a Softball game at Navin field.
- April 14 - Fowling Tournament at Fowling Warehouse
- April 16 - Bowing Open House at Downtown Youth Boxing Gym
- April 18 - Champions Night Charity Event: The sports-themed charity event, put on by and for the Autism Alliance.

=== 2016 ===
For the 2016 celebration, Detroit Champions held four events:

- April 16: 2nd annual Champions' Night Benefiting Autism Alliance of Michigan
- April 18: Champions' Day at the Historical Museum
- April 21: Champions' Fowling Tournament
- April 23: 3rd Annual Chug-A-Lug

The April 18th Event was held in the Allesee Gallery of Culture at the Detroit Historical Museum. The event included a talk given by author Charles Avison.

=== 2017 ===
In 2017, Detroit held three events:

- April 18: Champions' Day at the Historical Museum
- April 22: 4th Annual Chug-A-Lug
- April 28: Champions' Night Afterglow benefiting Autism Alliance of Michigan
