= Chris Kinard =

American badminton player (born 1950)

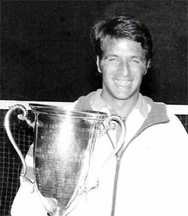

Personal information
- Nickname: Flying Kinard
- Born: November 8, 1950 (age 75) Pasadena, California, U.S.

Sport
- Country: United States
- Sport: Badminton
- Handedness: Right

Chris Kinard (born November 8, 1950, in Pasadena, California) is an American badminton player who was considered the top U.S. singles player in the 1970s, having been the U.S. # 1 ranked men's singles player for 7 of the decade's 10 years. He is married to former badminton player Utami Kinard.

== Badminton career ==
Kinard won the U.S. Men's Singles Championship 6 times (1972, 1974, 1976, 1977, 1979, 1981). and was the #1 U.S. player 7 times (1972, 1973, 1974, 1976, 1977, 1979, 1981). He was a member of every U.S. National Thomas Cup Team from 1969 to 1982 (competition then held every 3 years). Kinard played #1 singles on the '73, '79, & '82 Thomas Cup Teams. He was also the #1 U.S. Singles player on the 1977 Pan American Team.

Along with his U.S. titles, Chris Kinard won the South African Open Doubles Championship in 1971, the South African Open Singles Championship in 1980, the Peruvian Open Singles and Doubles Championship in 1976, the Peruvian Mixed Doubles Championship in 1974, and the Mexican Open Mixed Championship in 1979. Kinard also won the triple crown at the National Collegiate Men's Badminton Championships in 1977 winning the collegiate singles and doubles championships and leading his UCLA team to the national team title.

== Additional badminton career highlights ==
1973 - Kinard was invited by the Indonesian Badminton Association to train with its World Champion team, including individual World Champions Rudy Hartono, Christian Hadinata, Tjun Tjun, Liem Swie King, Ade Chandra, Johan Wahjudi.

1979 - Kinard was chosen to represent badminton in the made for television event, World Rackets Championships. Other athletes included: John McEnroe (tennis), Marty Hogan (racquetball), Dan Seemiller (table tennis), Sharif Khan (squash).

1980 - Kinard reached the round of 16 in the World Singles Championships held in Jakarta, Indonesia before losing to eventual champion, Rudy Hartono.

1980 - Kinard achieved a career high World Singles Ranking of #9

Kinard represented the U.S. in international competition in the following countries: Canada, Denmark, England, Germany, Indonesia, Ireland, Japan, Mexico, Peru, Singapore, South Africa, Sweden, Taiwan, Thailand

== Awards in Badminton ==
In 1976, he was in Sports Illustrated "Faces in the Crowd"

In 1978, he was recipient of the Ken Davidson Sportsmanship Award

In 1986, he was inducted into the Cal. State Univ. Los Angeles Athletic Hall of Fame

In 2003, he was inducted into the U.S. Badminton Hall of Fame, now Walk of Fame

In 2019, he was inducted into the Pasadena Sports Hall of Fame (Pasadena, California)

== Major Achievements in Badminton ==
Titles

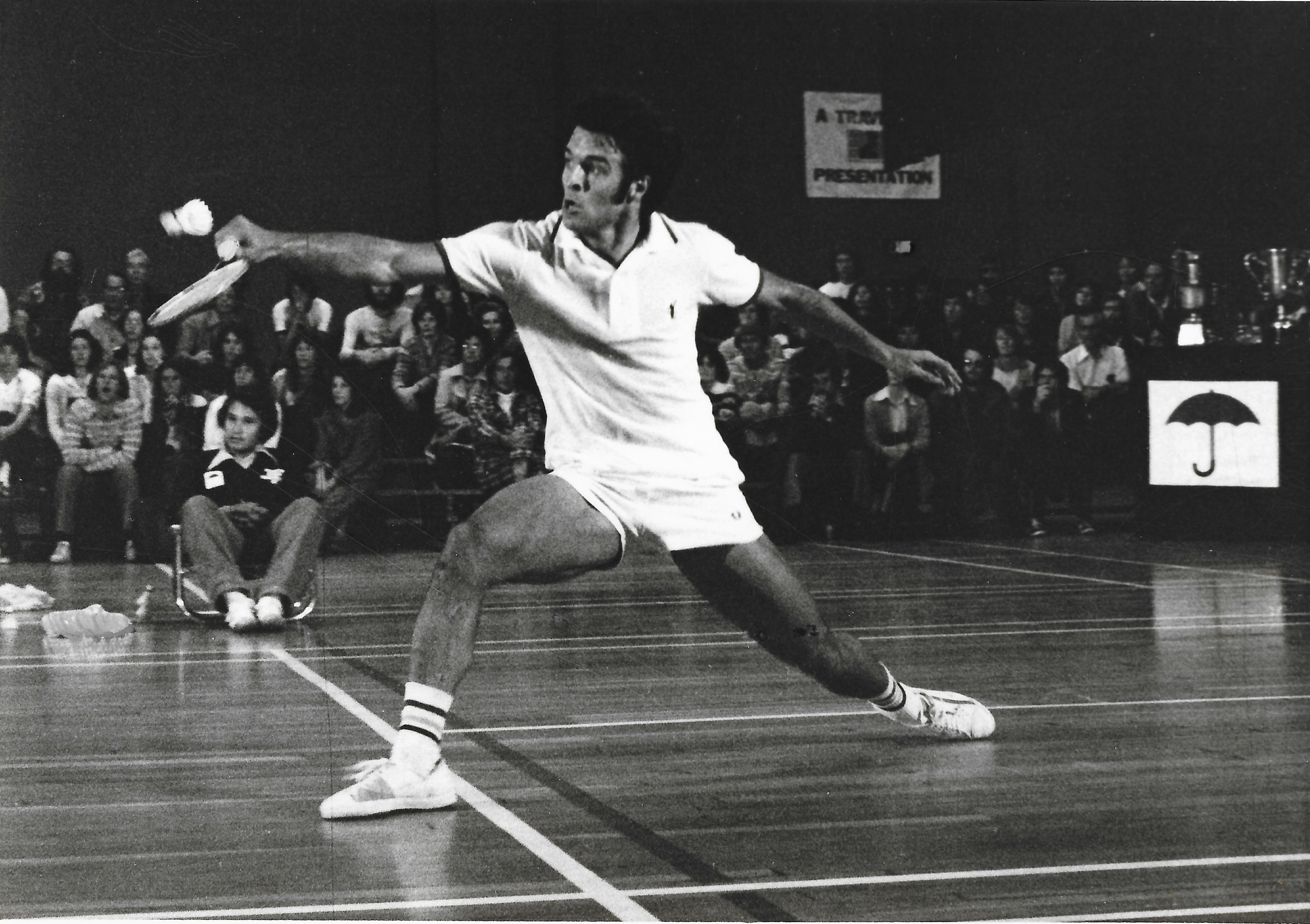
Chris Kinard, Badminton Champion

Tournament	Event	Year	Result
U.S. Championships	Men's Singles	1972	Champion
U.S. Championships	Men's Singles	1974	Champion
U.S. Championships	Men's Singles	1976	Champion
U.S. Championships	Men's Singles	1977	Champion
U.S. Championships	Men's Singles	1979	Champion
U.S. Championships	Men's Singles	1981	Champion
South African Open	Men's Singles	1980	Champion
South African Open	Men's Doubles	1971	Champion
Peruvian Open	Men's Singles	1976	Champion
Peruvian Open	Men's Doubles	1976	Champion
Peruvian Open	Mixed Doubles	1974	Champion
Mexican Open	Mixed Doubles	1979	Champion
ABA Intercollegiate Championship (representing UCLA)	Men's Singles	1977	Champion
ABA Intercollegiate Championship (representing UCLA)	Men's Doubles	1977	Champion
ABA Intercollegiate Championship (representing UCLA)	Team Championship	1977	Champion

Finalist

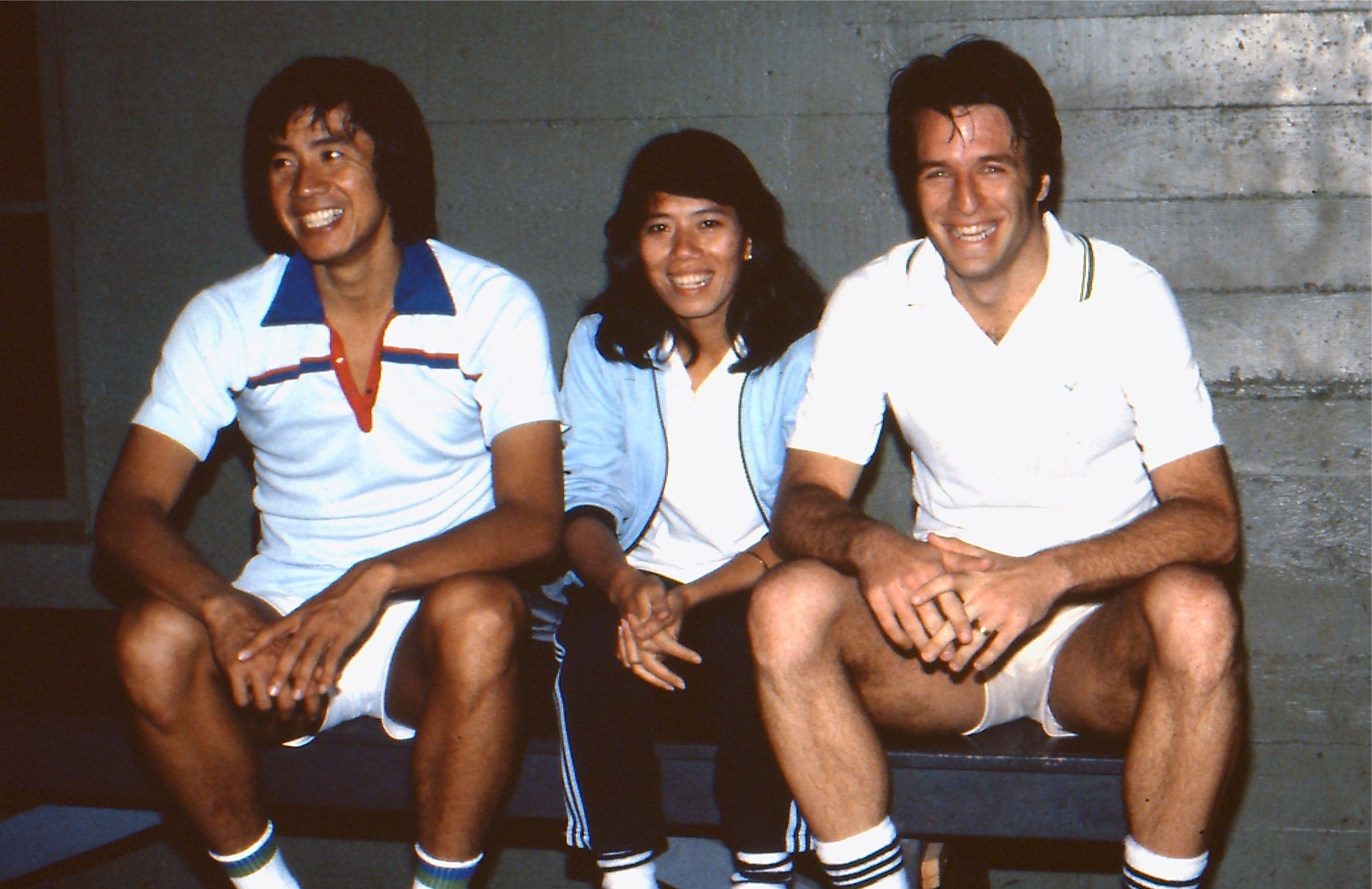
Rudy Hartono, Utami Kinard, Chris Kinard

Tournament	Event	Year	Result
U.S. Championships (Las Vegas, Nevada)	Men's Doubles	1971	Finalist
U.S. Championships (Omaha, Nebraska)	Men's Doubles	1972	Finalist
U.S. Championships (Heyward, California)	Men's Doubles	1974	Finalist
U.S. Championships (Omaha, Nebraska)	Men's Singles	1980	Finalist
South African Open	Men's Doubles	1980	Finalist
