= Walter R. Kramer =

American badminton player (1914–1995)

Walter R. Kramer (August 22, 1914 – October 15, 1995) was a U.S. badminton player. His last residences were in California and Washington state.

== Early life ==
He was born August 22, 1914 in Buchs, St. Gallen, Switzerland. He moved to the U.S. in 1924 at age 10. He and his wife Josephine (?-1980?) had three children: Walter (1936-2005), Patricia (1937), and Peggy (1939-1984). They moved from Detroit (Michigan) to Seattle in 1948. He remarried to Harriett (1921-1997) in the 1980s.

== Career ==
Walter Kramer won at the 1937 inaugural open U.S. Championships title in the men's singles. In the final, the 24-year-old Kramer who was from the Detroit Badminton Club defeated the Malaysian Ong Hock Sim 15:10, and 15:4, and thus ensured that the first U.S. title remained on the American continent . The following year, he successfully defended his title by defeating William Markham in the final. In 1939, however, his reign ended in the final when he was defeated by eighteen-year-old David G. Freeman.

== Accomplishments ==
Kramer finished first in Men's Doubles at the 1935 New England Badminton Championships with teammate James Bryson of Ottawa.

In 1936 Kramer was ranked the #1 badminton player in the U.S. He was honored by the City of Detroit as part of the first Champions Day, celebrating noted athletes from Detroit and Michigan. The Banquet was held on April 18, 1936.

In 1937 Kramer won the inaugural U.S. Championship in the men's singles event. He defeated Chinese champion from New England, H. S. Ong, 15-10, 15-4.

In 1938 Kramer successfully defended his title.

He began 1939 strongly by winning the Pennsylvania singles crown on February 20, 1939, though finishing only second place in mixed doubles with his wife against William Pinkerton and Barbara Jarman.

He was inducted into the Team USA Badminton Walk of Fame in 1956.
