= Mona Santoso =

Indonesian badminton player (born 1982)

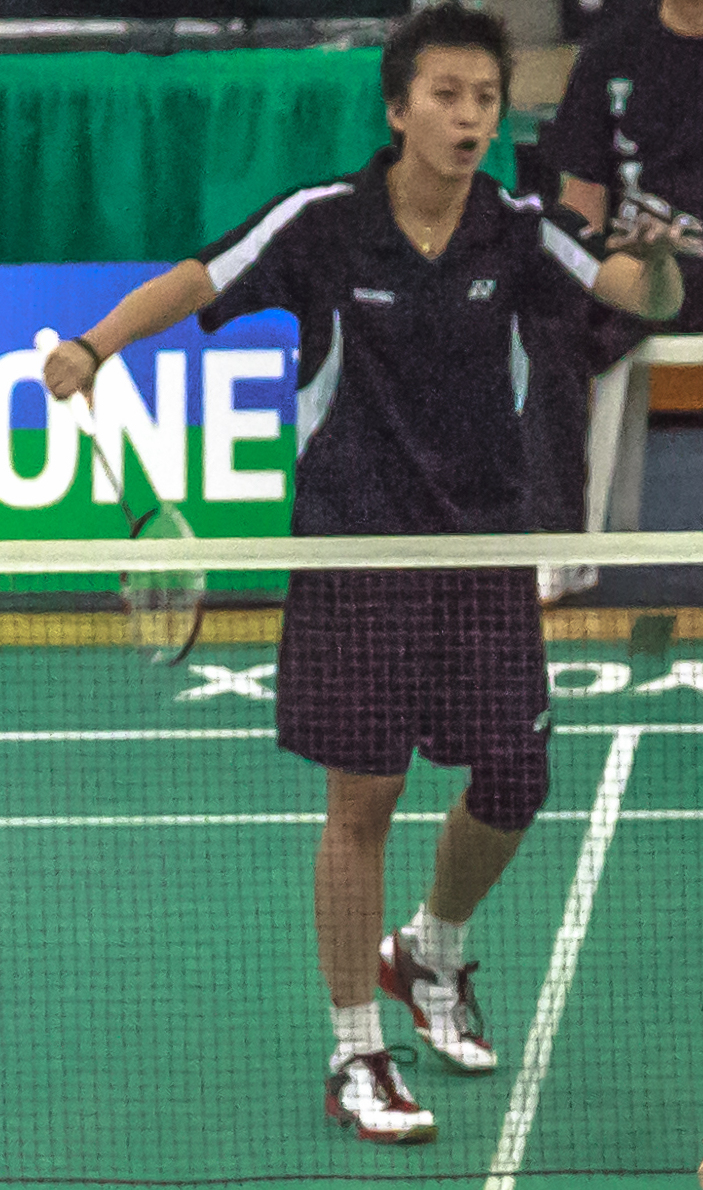

Personal information
- Born: 17 August 1982 (age 44)

Sport
- Country: Indonesia
- Sport: Badminton
- Event: Women's singles & doubles

Women's singles & doubles
- BWF profile
Medal record
Women's badminton
Representing Indonesia
World Junior Championships
Bronze medal – third place	2000 Guangzhou	Mixed team
Asian Junior Championships
Silver medal – second place	1999 Yangon	Girls' team

Mona Santoso (born 17 August 1982) is an Indonesian former badminton player, and later represented United States. Santoso was part of the Indonesia national team from 1998 to 2000. As a junior player, Santoso was the girls' singles champion at the 1998 Hong Kong Junior Championships, she also helped the Indonesian girls' team clinched the silver medal at the 1999 Asian Junior Championships, and the mixed team bronze medal at the 2000 World Junior Championships. Santoso won the women's doubles title at the 1999 Indonesian National Championships partnered with Vita Marissa. Santoso started her career as a badminton coach in Pola Bugar Club Jakarta from 2005 to 2006, and in 2006, she moved to Sunnyvale Community Center in Sunnyvale, California. Santoso then played for the United States, and won the U.S. National Championships title in 2008 and 2009.

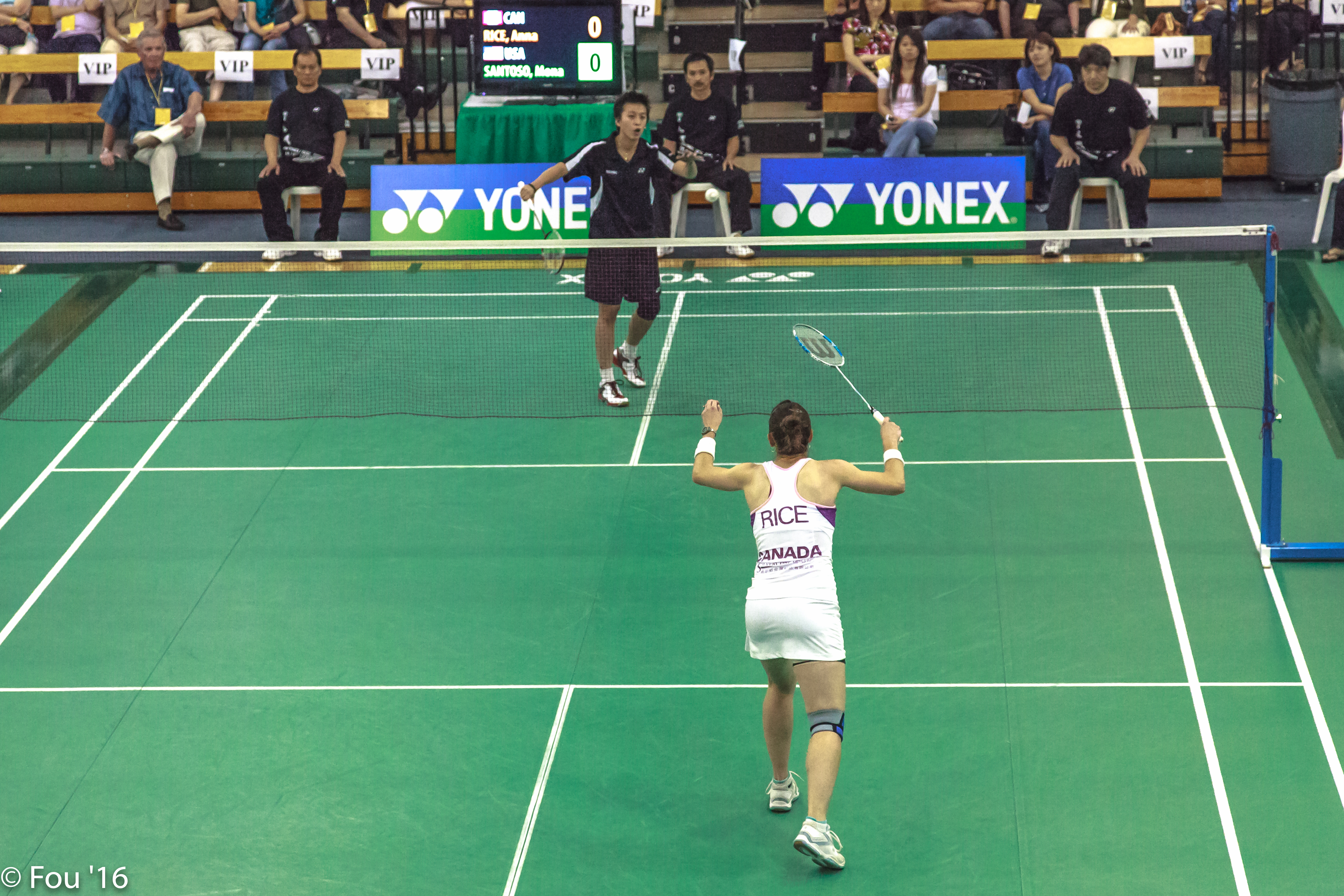
Santoso at the 2009 U.S. Open Badminton Championships

== Achievements ==
=== BWF Grand Prix ===
The BWF Grand Prix had two levels, the Grand Prix and Grand Prix Gold. It was a series of badminton tournaments sanctioned by the Badminton World Federation (BWF) and played between 2007 and 2017.

Women's singles
Year	Tournament	Opponent	Score	Result
2009	U.S. Open	(Canada) Anna Rice	17–21, 9–21	(silver) Runner-up

Women's doubles
Year	Tournament	Partner	Opponent	Score	Result
2009	Chinese Taipei Open	(Indonesia) Vita Marissa	(China) Yang Wei (China) Zhang Jiewen	14–21, 9–21	(silver) Runner-up

BWF Grand Prix Gold tournament
BWF Grand Prix tournament

=== IBF International ===
Mixed doubles
Year	Tournament	Partner	Opponent	Score	Result
2005	Surabaya Satellite	(Indonesia) Tri Kusharjanto	(Indonesia) Bambang Suprianto (Indonesia) Minarti Timur	Walkover	(silver) Runner-up
