= Law Teik Hock =

Malaysian badminton player

Law Teik Hock 卢德福
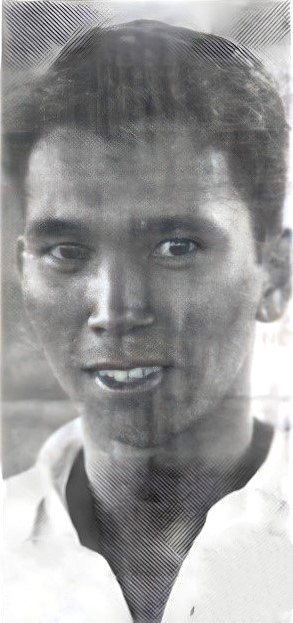

Personal information
- Born: 4 July 1922 George Town, Penang, Malaya
- Died: 13 July 2010 (aged 88) George Town, Penang, Malaysia

Sport
- Country: Malaysia
- Sport: Badminton
Medal record
Men's badminton
Representing Malaya
Thomas Cup
Gold medal – first place	1949 England	Team

Law Teik Hock (simplified Chinese: 卢德福; traditional Chinese: 盧德福; pinyin: Lú Défú; 4 July 1922 – 13 July 2010) was a Malaysian badminton player from George Town, Penang.

== Badminton career ==
Law won the first edition of Thomas Cup with the Malayan team in 1949. In the final against Denmark, Law was promoted to first singles after Wong Peng Soon was forced to skip the final due to an injury. In his first singles, he defeated Jørn Skaarup 15-5, 15–0 but lost 15-11, 15–1 to Mogens Felsby in the reverse singles.

In 1948, Law partnered Eddy Choong to a historic victory at the Penang Open. In the finals of the tournament, they defeated Ooi Teik Hock and Tan Kin Hong with the score line of 15–8 and 15-11, which was the first defeat for Ooi and Tan for over seven years.

In 1952, although Law did not make it to the national trials for the Malayan Thomas Cup qualifying team, he however, won the Malaysia Open men's doubles title for the first time.

== Achievements ==
=== International tournaments ===
Men's singles
Year	Tournament	Opponent	Score	Result	Ref.
1951	Malaysia Open	(Colony of Singapore) Wong Peng Soon	3–15, 6–15	(silver) Runner-up	

Men's doubles
Year	Tournament	Partner	Opponent	Score	Result	Ref.
1952	Malaysia Open	(Malaysia) David Choong	(Malaysia) Chee Phui Hang (Malaysia) Loong Pan Yap	15–5, 15–5	(gold) Winner	

== Personal life ==
Law was married to Khoo Cheng Poh and they had a son named Beng Yeow.

== Death ==
Law died of old age in his residence in Jalan Anson, George Town. He was 88.
