= T. Wynn Rogers =

American badminton player (1919–1998)

Thomas Wynn Rogers
Personal information
- Born: 24 October 1919 Taungoo, Burma
- Died: 9 August 1996 (aged 76) San Dimas, California, U.S.
- Height: 6 ft 2 in (188 cm)
- Weight: 165 lb (75 kg)
- Spouse: Evelyn "Sunny" Rogers

Sport
- Country: United States
- Sport: Badminton
- Event: Men's and mixed doubles
Medal record
Men's badminton
Representing United States
Thomas Cup
Silver medal – second place	1952 Singapore	Team
Bronze medal – third place	1949 England	Team

Thomas Wynn Rogers (24 October 1919 – 9 August 1996) was an American badminton player who won numerous U.S. national titles from the late 1940s to the mid-1960s.

== Career ==
Wynn Rogers (right) receiving the Kenneth Davidson Award from Taylor Caffery in 1969.

Primarily a doubles player, the tall, rangy Rogers swept all available doubles events (Men’s Doubles, Mixed Doubles, and Senior [age 40+] Men’s Doubles) at the U.S. Open Championships of 1961 and 1962. He was a runner-up in both Men’s Doubles and Mixed Doubles at the prestigious All-England Championships in 1949. Rogers was ranked first in U.S. men's doubles for seventeen consecutive seasons (1948–1964), the last fourteen of these with his longtime partner Joe Alston. He was a leading player on the 1952 U.S. Thomas Cup (men’s international) team which finished second in the then triennial world team competition. In 1956 Rogers was among the initial class of inductees into the U.S. Badminton Hall of Fame, now called the Walk of Fame.

== Achievements ==
=== International tournaments (7 titles, 5 runners-up) ===
Men's doubles
Year	Tournament	Partner	Opponent	Score	Result
1949	All England Open	(United States) David G. Freeman	(Malaysia) Ooi Teik Hock (Malaysia) Teoh Seng Khoon	5–15, 6–15	(silver) Runner-up
1955	U.S. Open	(United States) Joe Alston	(Malaysia) Eddy Choong (Canada) T. Darryl Thompson	15–6, 12–15, 15–8	(gold) Winner
1958	U.S. Open	(United States) Bob Williams	(Denmark) Jørgen Hammergaard Hansen (Denmark) Finn Kobberø	1–15, 8–15	(silver) Runner-up
1959	U.S. Open	(United States) Joe Alston	(Malaysia) Lim Say Hup (Malaysia) Teh Kew San	5–15, 3–15	(silver) Runner-up
1961	U.S. Open	(United States) Joe Alston	(United States) Michael Hartgrove (United States) Alan Mahaffey	15–8, 15–9	(gold) Winner
1962	U.S. Open	(United States) Joe Alston	(Indonesia) Ferry Sonneville (Indonesia) Tan Joe Hok	15–12, 7–15, 15–6	(gold) Winner
1964	U.S. Open	(United States) Joe Alston	(United States) Michael Hartgrove (United States) Jim Poole	15–2, 12–15, 15–10	(gold) Winner

Mixed doubles
Year	Tournament	Partner	Opponent	Score	Result
1949	All England Open	(England) Queenie Allen	(United States) Clinton Stephens (United States) Patricia Stephens	5–15, 15–2, 12–15	(silver) Runner-up
1954	U.S. Open	(United States) Loma Smith	(United States) Joe Alston (United States) Lois Alston	10–15, 10–15	(silver) Runner-up
1955	U.S. Open	(United States) Dorothy Hann	(United States) Joe Alston (United States) Lois Alston	8–15, 15–11, 15–9	(gold) Winner
1961	U.S. Open	(United States) Judy Hashman	(United States) Joe Alston (United States) Lois Alston	18–13, 15–2	(gold) Winner
1962	U.S. Open	(United States) Judy Hashman	(United States) Joe Alston (United States) Helen Tibbetts	15–4, 15–7	(gold) Winner

== Summary ==
Tournament	Event	Year
US Open	Men's Doubles	1955, 1961, 1962, 1964
US Open	Mixed Doubles	1955, 1961, 1962
US Championships	Men's Doubles	1948, 1949, 1950, 1951, 1952, 1953
US Championships	Mixed Doubles	1947, 1949, 1950, 1951, 1952
