= Robert Hodge (cricketer) =

Scottish cricketer and badminton player

Personal information
- Full name: Robert Stevenson Hodge
- Born: 5 November 1914; Greenock, Renfrewshire, Scotland
- Died: 15 September 1994 (aged 79); Guildford, Surrey, England
- Height: 6 ft 3 in (1.91 m)
- Batting: Right-handed
- Bowling: Right-arm fast-medium

Domestic team information
- Years: Team
- 1938–1951: Scotland

Career statistics
Competition	First-class
Matches	10
Runs scored	178
Batting average	11.12
100s/50s	–/–
Top score	38
Balls bowled	2,177
Wickets	30
Bowling average	27.23
5 wickets in innings	1
10 wickets in match	–
Best bowling	5/82
Catches/stumpings	3/–
- Source: Cricinfo, 1 August 2022

Robert Stevenson Hodge (5 November 1914 — 15 September 1994) was a Scottish first-class cricketer and badminton player.

Hodge was born in November 1914 at Greenock, where he was educated at the Greenock Academy. A club cricketer for Greenock, Hodge made two appearances for Scotland in first-class cricket before the Second World War, playing against Ireland in 1938 at Glasgow and in 1939 at Dublin. Prior to the war, he had joined the Admiralty and had been employed at the Rosyth Dockyard on the Forth of Firth since 1939. In September 1945, he was selected to represent the Under 33s in the Over 33s v Under 33s match at Lord's. Making what Wisden described as a startling entrance, he twice dismissed two batsman in an over and finished with first innings figures of 5 for 82, which would be his only first-class five wicket haul. He resumed playing first-class cricket for Scotland following the war, making a further seven appearances to 1951. Described as possessing a free bowling action, Hodge took 25 wickets for Scotland at an average of 21.80, with best figures of 4 for 26. After the war, he resumed his pre-war career as a land surveyor. In addition to playing cricket, Hodge also played represented Scotland at international level in badminton. He died in England at Guildford in September 1994.
