= Teoh Seng Khoon =

Malaysian badminton player (1918–2018)

Teoh Seng Khoon 张成坤
Personal information
- Born: 8 November 1918 Ipoh, Perak, British Malaya
- Died: 31 July 2018 (aged 99) Ipoh, Perak, Malaysia

Sport
- Country: Malaysia
- Sport: Badminton
Medal record
Men's badminton
Representing Malaya
Thomas Cup
Gold medal – first place	1949 Preston	Team

Teoh Seng Khoon (simplified Chinese: 张成坤; traditional Chinese: 張成坤; pinyin: Zhāng Chéng Kūn; 8 November 1918 – 31 July 2018) was a Malaysian badminton player who represented his country in team and individual competition between 1940s to 1950s.

== Early life ==
Teoh was born on 8 November 1918 in Ipoh, Perak, Malaya. He studied at Anglo-Chinese School (ACS) Ipoh and spent his early years as a journalist and later as Ipoh bureau chief for the 'Straits Echo and Times of Malaya'.

== Badminton career ==
Teoh played on the 1949 Malayan Thomas Cup (men's international) team and won the world title. Paired with Ooi Teik Hock, he was undefeated in the Thomas Cup doubles matches. He also shared the men's doubles title at the All-England Championships in 1949 with Ooi.

== Personal life ==
Teoh married Foo Soon Tai and together they had a son and three daughters.

== Death ==
Teoh, the last surviving member of the first-ever Malaya Thomas Cup team, died peacefully in Ipoh on 31 July 2018, aged 99.

== Achievements ==
=== International tournaments ===
Men's doubles
Year	Tournament	Partner	Opponent	Score	Result
1949	Denmark Open	(Malaysia) Ooi Teik Hock	(Malaysia) Chan Kon Leong (Malaysia) Yeoh Teck Chye	15–7, 18–16	(gold) Winner
1949	All England	(Malaysia) Ooi Teik Hock	(United States) David G. Freeman (United States) Wynn Rogers	15–5, 15–6	(gold) Winner
