= Patricia Stephens (badminton) =

American badminton player (1928–2016)

Personal information
- Born: Patricia Anne Roberts; November 26, 1928
- Died: July 23, 2016 (aged 87)

Sport
- Country: United States
- Sport: Badminton

Patricia Anne Stephens (née Roberts; November 26, 1928 – July 23, 2016), also known as Patsey Stephens, was an American international badminton player.

== Badminton career ==
Stephens won the mixed doubles in 1949 All England Badminton Championships with her husband Clinton Stephens. Patsey also won the mixed doubles in the 1948 U.S. National Badminton Championships and women's doubles in the 1962 U.S. Open Championships.

== Death ==
Stephens died on July 23, 2016, at the age of 87.
