= Clinton Stephens =

American badminton player (1919–1995)

Personal information
- Born: 13 October 1919 New York City
- Died: 19 September 1995 (aged 75) Ruxton, Maryland

Sport
- Country: United States
- Sport: Badminton
Medal record
Men's badminton
Representing United States
Thomas Cup
Bronze medal – third place	1949 England	Team

Clinton Paulson Stephens (1919-1995), was a male United States badminton player.

== Profile ==
After gaining a degree at the City College of New York in 1938 Stephens served in the US Army and was awarded two bronze stars. He married Patricia Roberts in 1948. After retiring he worked as an investment banker.

== Badminton career ==
Stephens won the mixed doubles in 1949 All England Badminton Championships with his wife Patricia Stephens. Stephens also won a bronze medal in the 1949 Thomas Cup and the mixed doubles in the 1948 U.S. National Badminton Championships.
