= Ooi Teik Hock =

Malaysian badminton player (1920–1983)

Ooi Teik Hock 黄德福
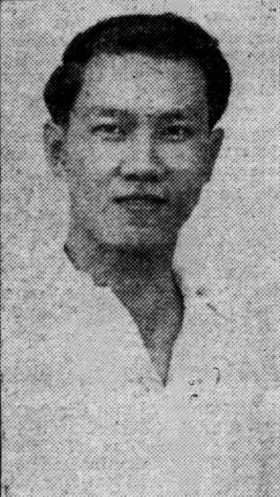
- Ooi Teik Hock in 1950

Personal information
- Born: 13 November 1920 Penang, Malaya
- Died: 21 March 1983 (aged 62) Penang, Malaysia

Sport
- Country: Malaysia
- Sport: Badminton
Medal record
Men's badminton
Representing Malaya
Thomas Cup
Gold medal – first place	1949 Preston	Team
Gold medal – first place	1952 Singapore	Team
Gold medal – first place	1955 Singapore	Team
Silver medal – second place	1958 Singapore	Team

Ooi Teik Hock (simplified Chinese: 黄德福; traditional Chinese: 黃德福; Pe̍h-ōe-jī: Ûiⁿ Tek-hok; pinyin: Huáng Défú; born 13 November 1920 – 21 March 1983) was a male badminton player from Malaysia who won Malayan national titles and represented his country in team and individual competition between 1939 and 1958.

== Career ==
Ooi played on four consecutive Malayan Thomas Cup (men's international) teams (1949, 1952, 1955, 1958) the first three of which claimed world titles. Paired with a variety of partners, he was undefeated in eight Thomas Cup doubles matches, while winning four of his six singles matches. He shared the men's doubles title at the prestigious All-England Championships in 1949 with Teoh Seng Khoon and in 1954 with Ong Poh Lim. In the '49 All-England's he was runner-up in men's singles to the legendary Dave Freeman.

== Personal life ==
Ooi married Choo Soh Cheng and together they had a son, Beng Leng, and two daughters, Sooi Choo and Sooi Gaik.

== Death ==
On 21 March 1983, Teik Hock died at his Penang home after a heart attack. He was 62.

== Achievements ==
=== International tournaments ===
Men's singles
Year	Tournament	Opponent	Score	Result
1940	Malaysia Open	(Straits Settlements) Wong Peng Soon	1–15, 7–15	(silver) Runner-up
1948	Malaysia Open	(Federated Malay States) Lim Kee Fong	15–6, 15–6	(gold) Winner
1949	Denmark Open	(United States) David G. Freeman	11–15, 18–14, 15–17	(silver) Runner-up
1949	All England	(United States) David G. Freeman	1–15, 6–15	(silver) Runner-up
1949	Malaysia Open	(Malaysia) Wong Peng Soon	6–15, 10–15	(silver) Runner-up
1950	Malaysia Open	(Malaysia) Wong Peng Soon	13–15, 4–15	(silver) Runner-up
1954	Malaysia Open	(Malaysia) Ong Poh Lim	15–9, 1–15, 7–15	(silver) Runner-up

Men's doubles
Year	Tournament	Partner	Opponent	Score	Result
1940	Malaysia Open	(Federated Malay States) Tan Kin Hong	(Straits Settlements) Chee Choon Wah (Straits Settlements) Chee Choon Keng	18–14, 15–11	(gold) Winner
1947	Malaysia Open	(Federated Malay States) Tan Kin Hong	(Federated Malay States) Chee Choon Wah (Federated Malay States) Chee Choon Keng	18–17, 18–17	(gold) Winner
1948	Malaysia Open	(Federated Malay States) Tan Kin Hong	(Federated Malay States) Chee Choon Wah (Federated Malay States) Chee Choon Keng	15–9, 7–15, 17–16	(gold) Winner
1949	Denmark Open	(Malaysia) Teoh Seng Khoon	(Malaysia) Chan Kon Leong (Malaysia) Yeoh Teck Chye	15–7, 18–16	(gold) Winner
1949	All England	(Malaysia) Teoh Seng Khoon	(United States) David G. Freeman (United States) Wynn Rogers	15–5, 15–6	(gold) Winner
1954	All England	(Malaysia) Ong Poh Lim	(Malaysia) David Choong (Malaysia) Eddy Choong	18–16, 15–12	(gold) Winner
1954	US Open	(Malaysia) Ong Poh Lim	(Malaysia) David Choong (Malaysia) Eddy Choong	15–1, 15–4	(gold) Winner
1955	Malaysia Open	(Malaysia) Ong Poh Lim	(Denmark) Finn Kobberø (Denmark) Jørgen Hammergaard Hansen	15–7, 18–17	(gold) Winner
1956	US Open	(Malaysia) Ong Poh Lim	(Denmark) Finn Kobberø (Denmark) Jørgen Hammergaard Hansen	15–9, 8–15, 7–15	(silver) Runner-up

Mixed doubles
Year	Tournament	Partner	Opponent	Score	Result
1939	Malaysia Open	(Federated Malay States) Cecilia Chan	(Federated Malay States) Chan Kon Leong (Federated Malay States) Chan Kon Yoon	15–4, 15–11	(gold) Winner
1940	Malaysia Open	(Federated Malay States) Cecilia Chan	(Straits Settlements) Wong Peng Soon (Federated Malay States) Lee Chee Neo	9–15, 11–15	(silver) Runner-up
