= Marten Mendez =

American badminton player (1916–1994)

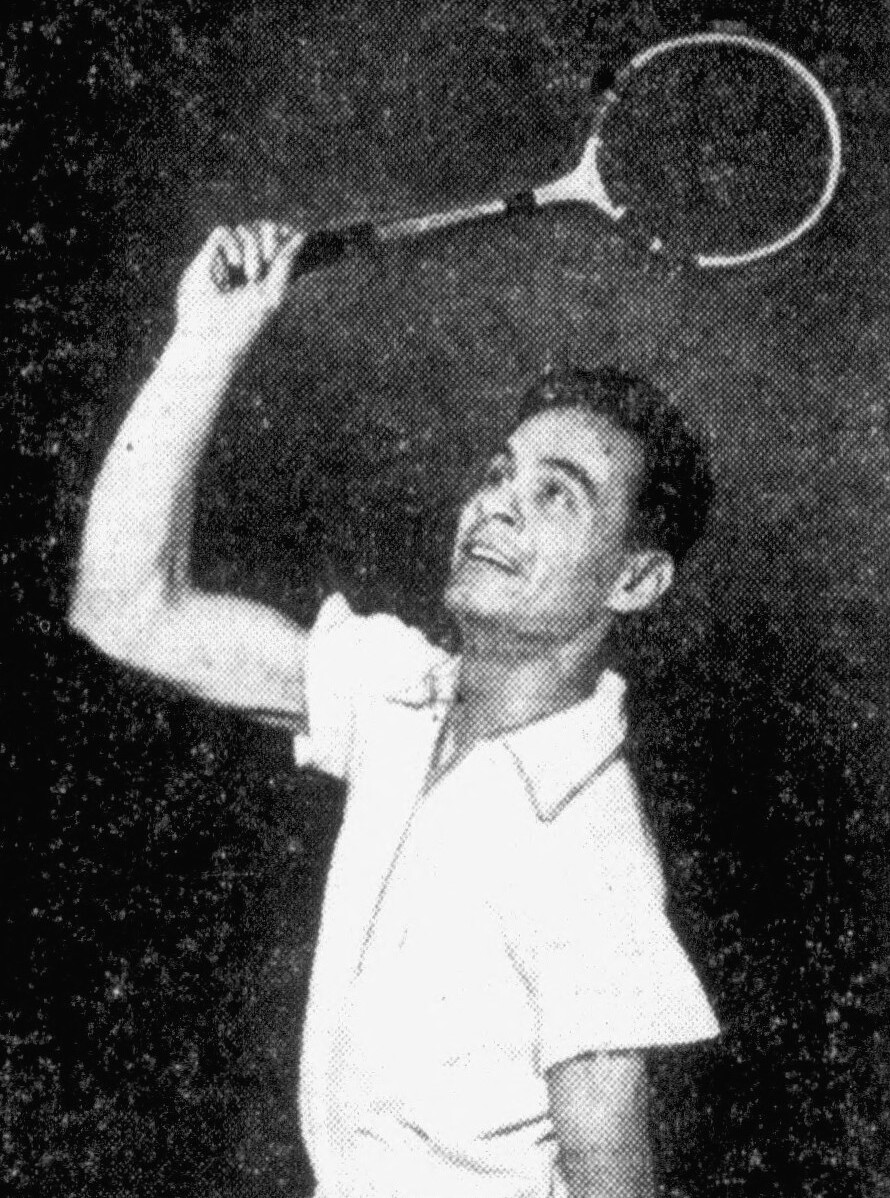
- Mendez, circa 1949

Personal information
- Country: United States
- Born: 28 August 1916
- Died: 25 August 1994 (aged 77)
Medal record
Men's badminton
Representing United States
Thomas Cup
Silver medal – second place	1952 Singapore	Team
Bronze medal – third place	1949 England	Team

A. Marten Mendez (28 August 1916 – 25 August 1994) was an American badminton player of Mexican descent who won national titles and represented his country internationally in the late 1940s and early 1950s. Known for his swift court coverage and stamina, Mendez won the U.S. men's singles title in 1949, 1950, and 1952, and reached the final in 1948 and 1951. He was a member of the 1948-1949 and 1951-1952 U.S. Thomas Cup (men's international) teams which made strong runs at the world championship. In the 1951-1952 series, at the age of 36, Mendez won three of his four singles matches against India and Malaya in Singapore's equatorial heat, losing only to the great Wong Peng Soon. Mendez was elected to the U.S. Badminton Hall of Fame in 1967.
