= 1952 Thomas Cup =

Tournament details
- Dates: 24 May – 1 June 1952
- Edition: 2nd
- Level: International
- Nations: 4
- Venue: Selangor Badminton Association Hall; Happy World Stadium
- Location: Kuala Lumpur, Malaysia; Kallang, Singapore

The 1952 Thomas Cup competition is an international team tournament for supremacy in men's badminton (its female counterpart is the Uber Cup). Beginning in 1948–49, it was held every three years until 1982 and thereafter has been held every two years. Twelve national teams contested for the Thomas Cup in the 1951-1952 badminton season, the tournament's second edition. According to the rules then in place Malaya was exempt from earlier ties (team matches), needing only to defend its title in a conclusive challenge round tie. The other contestants were divided into three regional qualifying zones, the Pacific, Europe, and Pan America, for the early ties. The winners of each zone then played-off in Malaya for the right to face Malaya in the challenge round. For a more detailed description of the Thomas Cup format see Wikipedia's general article on the Thomas Cup.

== Qualification ==
India qualified in the Pacific Zone by beating newcomers Thailand and Australia without the loss of a match (thus, 9–0 in each case). Six of the twelve teams in the tournament contested in the European zone. Here Denmark emerged victorious, but not without a tough fight from Sweden (6–3) in the zone semifinal. In the Pan American zone with only two teams, the United States defeated Canada 6–3, trumping a fine performance by Canada's Don Smythe.

Means of qualification	Date	Venue	Slot	Qualified teams
1949 Thomas Cup	22 – 26 February 1949	Preston	1	Malaya
Pacific Zone	30 June – 1 October 1951	Bombay; Melbourne	1	India
American Zone	23 – 24 March 1952	Calgary	1	United States
European Zone	10 November 1951 – 19 March 1952	Paris; Bessbrook; Nottingham; Copenhagen; Manchester	1	Denmark
Total			4	

== Knockout stage ==
The following four teams, shown by region, qualified for the 1952 Thomas Cup. Defending champion and host Malaya automatically qualified to defend the title it had won three years previously.

=== Bracket ===
First round
Malaya
Bye
24 May 1952 – Kuala Lumpur
Denmark	3
India	6
United States
Bye

Second round
Malaya
Bye
27 May 1952 – Singapore
India	4
United States	5

Challenge round
31 May 1952 – Singapore
Malaya	7
United States	2

=== First round ===
24 May 1952
25 May 1952

Denmark	3–6	India
Report

Selangor Badminton Association Hall, Kuala Lumpur

=== Second round ===
27 May 1952
28 May 1952

United States	5–4	India
Report

Happy World Stadium, Singapore

=== Final ===
31 May 1952
1 June 1952

Malaya	7–2	United States
Report

Happy World Stadium, Singapore

1952 Thomas Cup winner

Malaya
Second title
