= David Guthrie Freeman =

American badminton player (1920–2001)

David G. Freeman
Personal information
- Nickname: Pasadena Flash
- Born: 6 September 1920 Pasadena, California
- Died: 28 June 2001 (aged 80) Rancho Santa Fe, California

Sport
- Country: United States
- Sport: Badminton
- Handedness: Right
Medal record
Men's badminton
Representing United States
Thomas Cup
Bronze medal – third place	1949 England	Team

David Guthrie Freeman (6 September 1920 – 28 June 2001) was an American badminton player from California who became an icon in the sport's history.

== Early life ==
Freeman was born on September 6, 1920, in Pasadena, the son of Robert Freeman, a Presbyterian minister, and Margery Fulton, professor of religion. In 1938 he graduated from Pasadena JC and in 1942 got his B.A. at Pomona College. He entered Harvard Medical School in 1942 and completed its accelerated war-time curriculum in 1945.

== Badminton career ==
During his teenage years Freeman demonstrated exceptional ability in tennis, table tennis, and, particularly, badminton. From early in 1939, at the age of eighteen, through his final tournament match fourteen years later, Freeman was undefeated in badminton singles competition. Displaying his characteristic quickness, agility, and shot-making precision, Freeman won the prestigious All-England Championship on his only try (1949) and remains the sole American to win the men's singles there. In this one-time-only badminton stint in Europe he also won Thomas Cup singles matches against eventual champion Malaya, and captured the Danish Open. In all, he won three matches each against Ooi Teik Hock and the formidable Wong Peng Soon.

After apparently retiring from badminton in 1950 to concentrate on a career in neurosurgery, Freeman made a brief comeback in 1953. He won the four tournaments that he entered which concluded with the U.S. National Championships in Boston, and a victory in the same hall where he had last lost a singles match fourteen years earlier. He is the only American born male to be inducted into both the U.S. and World Badminton Halls of Fame.

== Personal life ==
Freeman married his wife Addie in 1942 and they had two sons (Rees and Dave) and a daughter (Diana Peterson).

== Death ==
Freeman died on 28 June 2001, at San Diego Hospice. He was 80 and had Merkle cell carcinoma.

== Major achievements in badminton ==
=== International tournaments ===
Men's singles
Year	Tournament	Opponent	Score	Result
1949	Denmark Open	(Malaysia) Ooi Teik Hock	15–11, 14–18, 17–15	(gold) Winner
1949	All England	(Malaysia) Ooi Teik Hock	15–1, 15–6	(gold) Winner

Men's doubles
Year	Tournament	Partner	Opponent	Score	Result
1949	All England	(United States) Wynn Rogers	(Malaysia) Ooi Teik Hock (Malaysia) Teoh Seng Khoon	5–15, 6–15	(silver) Runner-up

=== Summary ===
Tournament	Event	Year
U.S. Championships	Men's Singles	1939, 1940, 1941, 1942, 1947, 1948, 1953
U.S. Championships	Men's Doubles	1940, 1941, 1942, 1947, 1948
U.S. Championships	Mixed Doubles	1940, 1941, 1942
All-England Championships	Men's Singles	1949
Danish Open	Men's Singles	1949
Toronto Invitational	Men's Singles	1953

== Tennis and other sports ==
Freeman's racket sport exploits were not limited to badminton. He won the U.S. Junior Tennis Championship in 1938, defeating Welby Van Horn in the final, and with Bill Talbert was the runner-up in U.S. men's doubles in 1943. Additionally he won the U.S. Army Tennis Championship in 1947; the New England Squash title in 1945; and a variety of table tennis tournaments.

=== Grand Slam finals ===
==== Doubles (1 runner-up) ====
Result	Year	Championship	Surface	Partner	Opponents	Score
Loss	1943	U.S. Championships	Grass	(United States) Bill Talbert	(United States) Jack Kramer (United States) Frank Parker	2–6, 4–6, 4–6
