= Thomas Cup =

International badminton competition

- Current season, competition or edition: 2026 Thomas & Uber Cup
- Sport: Badminton
- Founded: 1949
- Founder: George Alan Thomas
- No. of teams: 16
- Countries: BWF member nations
- Most recent champion: China (12th title)
- Most titles: Indonesia (14 titles)
- Website: Official website

The Thomas Cup, sometimes referred as World Men's Team Championships, is an international badminton competition among teams representing member nations of the Badminton World Federation (BWF), the sport's global governing body. The championships have been conducted every two years since the 1982, amended from being conducted every three years since the first tournament held in 1948–1949.

The final phase of the tournament involves 12 teams competing at venues within the host nation and is played concurrently with the final phase of the world women's team championships, the Uber Cup (first held in 1956–1957). Since 1984, the two Cups have been held jointly at the various stages of play. Thomas Cup and, to a lesser extent, Uber Cup are some of the world's "biggest" and most prestigious regularly held badminton events in terms of player and fan interest.

Of the 30 Thomas Cup tournaments held since 1948–1949, only six countries have won the title. Indonesia is the most successful team, having won 14 times. China, which did not begin to compete before 1982, trails Indonesia with 12 titles, while Malaysia has won 5 titles.

Japan became the fourth country to win the Thomas Cup after beating Malaysia 3–2 in the 2014 final. Denmark became the first European and the fifth nation to win the Thomas Cup after beating Indonesia 3–2 in the 2016 final. This marked the first and only time a non-Asian team won the championship. India is the sixth nation overall to win the Thomas Cup, after beating title holders Indonesia 3–0 in the 2022 edition. China is the current champion in the 2026 edition.

== History ==
=== Origins and Inaugural Tournament ===
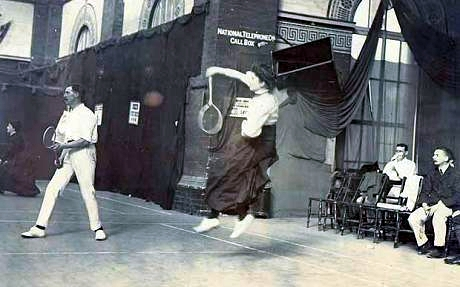
Sir George Alan Thomas and Ethel B. Thomson playing badminton, 1905

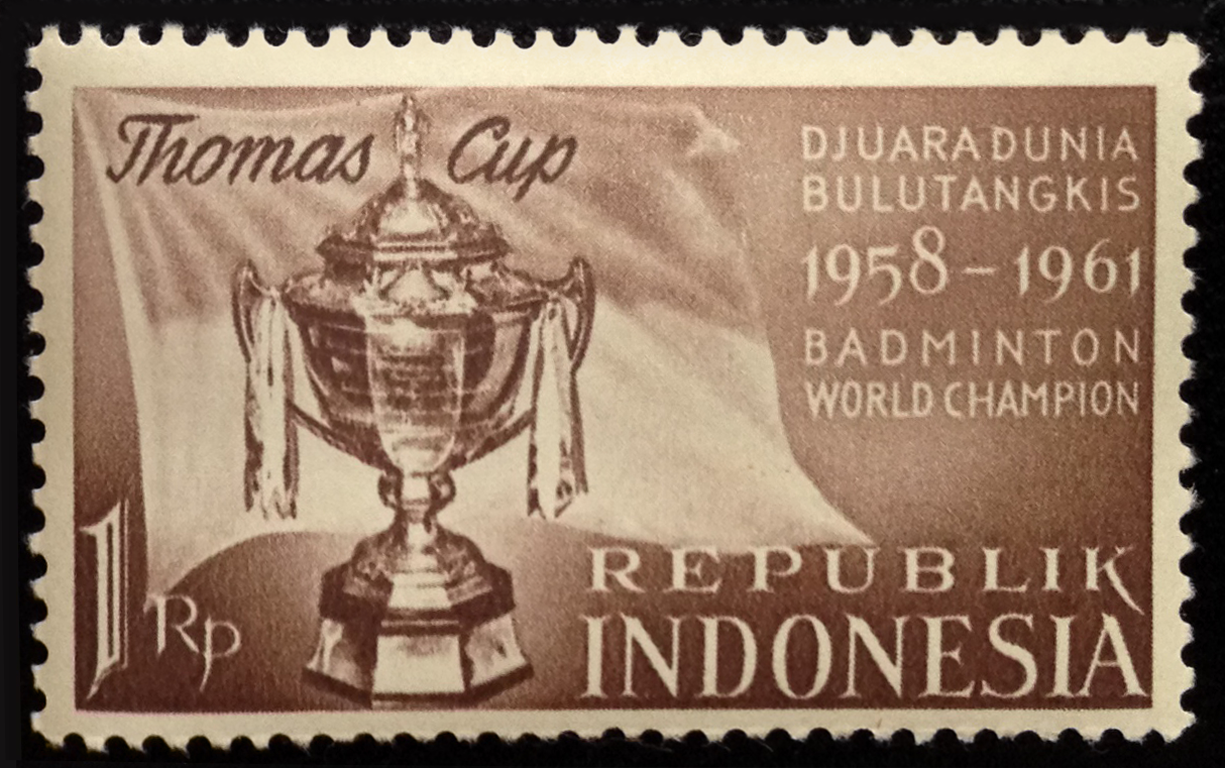
1961 Thomas Cup held in Indonesia, commemorated with a stamp.

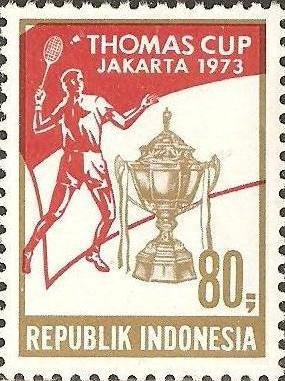
1973 Thomas Cup held in Indonesia, commemorated with a stamp.

The Thomas Cup was proposed in 1939 by Sir George Alan Thomas, an English badminton player who drew inspiration from tennis's Davis Cup and football's World Cup. The proposal was accepted at a general meeting of the International Badminton Federation (IBF, now Badminton World Federation or BWF). That same year, Thomas donated the official trophy, formally known as The International Badminton Championship Challenge Cup, manufactured by Atkin Bros of London at a cost of US$40,000. The 28-inch-high silver trophy comprises a pedestal, bowl, and a lid surmounted by a player figure.

Originally scheduled for the 1941–1942 season, the inaugural tournament was postponed until 1948–1949 due to World War II. Ten national teams entered the first competition, competing across three qualifying zones: Pan America, Europe, and the Pacific (where Malaya was the sole entrant).

Under the original format used until 1984, each team tie consisted of nine matches played over two days (five singles and four doubles), with a team needing five victories to win. The format featured a crossover system: each team's top two singles players and two doubles pairings played both of their respective counterparts, while a final singles match was contested by the third-ranked players.

For the inaugural inter-zone knockout phase held in the United Kingdom, qualification winners Denmark and the United States joined Malaya. As the tournament used a single-elimination format, Denmark received a first-round bye. Malaya defeated the United States 6–3 in Glasgow, Scotland. This tie featured one of only three historical matchups between the American Dave Freeman and Malayan Wong Peng Soon, the era's two leading singles players. In the final at Preston, England, Malaya defeated Denmark 8–1 to become the inaugural Thomas Cup champions.

=== Development and early dominance ===
As tournament participation grew, the Pacific zone was divided into Asian and Australasian qualifying zones for the 1954–1955 edition. Beginning with the 1951–1952 tournament, qualifying zone winners competed to determine a challenger against the reigning champion. Under the initial challenge round system, which was used until 1964, the defending champion was exempt from qualification ties and automatically hosted the final tie.

Led by veterans such as Wong Peng Soon, Ooi Teik Hock, and Ong Poh Lim, Malaya successfully defended its title in 1952 against the United States (7–2) and in 1955 against Denmark (8–1). Indonesia won its first title in 1958, defeating Malaya 6–3 with a team featuring Ferry Sonneville and Tan Joe Hok. Indonesia then retained the Cup in 1961 against Thailand (6–3) and in 1964 against Denmark (5–4).

To reduce home-court advantage, a rule change effective in 1964 prohibited nations from hosting consecutive challenge rounds. The 1964 challenge round in Tokyo was nonetheless controversial, as Denmark protested the 5–4 Indonesian victory due to interference from Indonesian fans; however, the IBF upheld the result. During the 1967 challenge round in Jakarta, Malaysia held a 4–3 lead when crowd disruptions during the eighth match prompted tournament referee Herbert Scheele to suspend play. Following Indonesia's refusal to accept an IBF directive to resume the tie at a neutral venue in New Zealand, the remaining matches were awarded to Malaysia, giving them a 6–3 victory and the title.

=== Format reforms and bipartite era ===
Following the 1967 controversy, the IBF abolished the challenge round system. Defending champions no longer received direct entry to the final tie, instead entering at the inter-zone semifinals. Despite this change, Indonesia dominated the tournament throughout the 1970s. Featuring notable players such as Rudy Hartono, Tjun Tjun and Christian Hadinata, Indonesia won consecutive titles in 1970, 1973, 1976, and 1979. Across the 1973, 1976, and 1979 editions, the Indonesian team swept their ties by winning 51 of 54 individual matches.

China joined the IBF in 1982 and won the tournament in its debut appearance, defeating Indonesia 5–4 in London. This marked the beginning of an era predominantly dominated by China and Indonesia. Since 1982, only four other nations have broken this dual dominance to capture the Thomas Cup: Malaysia (1992), Japan (2014), Denmark (2016, becoming the first European winner), and India (2022).

== Revised format ==
=== 1984 structural overhaul ===
In 1984, the International Badminton Federation (IBF) instituted major format revisions to the Thomas Cup and the women's world team championship, the Uber Cup. The competition schedule transitioned from a triennial to a biennial cycle, with both tournaments held concurrently at the same host venues. Individual team ties were reduced from nine matches over two days to five matches (three singles and two doubles) played in a single day, with each player or pair now playing only one match against their direct counterpart.

The single-elimination zone qualification system was replaced by group round-robin qualifying tournaments. Between 1984 and 2002, eight teams qualified for the final phase: the host nation, the defending champion, and six regional qualifiers. The final eight were divided into two groups of four for round-robin play, with the top two teams in each group advancing to the single-elimination semifinals. A third-place playoff tie was held between 1984 and 1988 before being discontinued in 1990.

=== Tournament expansions (2004–Present) ===
The final phase was expanded to 12 teams in 2004, introducing regional qualification through five continental confederations (Africa, Asia, Europe, Oceania, and Pan America). Under this system, the 12 qualifying teams competed in four round-robin groups of three. Group winners received direct quarterfinal berths, while second- and third-place teams played preliminary knockout matches to complete the quarterfinal lineup. A proposal in 2007 to split the hosting of the Thomas Cup and Uber Cup was abandoned.

In 2014, the final phase expanded to 16 teams. Qualification for the 2014 tournament was based on BWF World Team Rankings with continental quota guarantees, temporarily replacing continental qualifying tournaments. In 2016, the qualification structure reverted to using continental team championships as primary qualifiers. Under the current system, automatic berths are awarded to the defending champion, the host nation, the five continental champions, and the semifinalists from Asia and Europe, with remaining places allocated according to BWF World Team Rankings.

=== Qualification slots history ===
Below shows the qualification slots in tournament history:

Year	Total	Zone						
1949	3	European; 1	Pacific; 1	Pan American; 1				
1952	4	Champions & host 1	European; 1	Pacific; 1	Pan American; 1			
1955–1973, 1979	5	Champions & host 1	Asian; 1	Australasian; 1	European; 1	Pan American; 1		
1976, 1982	6	Champions & host 2	Asian; 1	Australasian; 1	European; 1	Pan American; 1		
1984	8	Champions & host 2	Qualifying (held in Asia – New Delhi); 1	Qualifying (held in Asia – Hong Kong); 1	Qualifying (held in Europe); 3	Qualifying (held in Pan America); 1		
1986	8	Champions & host 2	Qualifying (held in Asia); 2	Qualifying (held in Europe); 3	Qualifying (held in Pan America); 1			
1988	8	Champions & host 2	Qualifying (held in Asia); 1	Qualifying (held in Europe); 3	Qualifying (held in Oceania); 1	Qualifying (held in Pan America); 1		
1990–1994, 1998, 2000	8	Champions & host 2	Qualifying (held in Europe); 3	Qualifying (held in Asia); 3				
1996	8	Champions & host 2	Qualifying (held in Europe); 3	Qualifying (held in Oceania); 3				
2002	8	Champions & host 2	Qualifying (held in Europe); 3	Qualifying (held in Oceania); 3				
2004, 2012	12	Champions & host 1	Asian; 5	European; 3	African; 1	Oceanian; 1	Pan American; 1	
2006–2010	12	Champions & host 2	Asian; 4	European; 3	African; 1	Oceanian; 1	Pan American; 1	
2014	16	Champions & host 2	From BWF World Team Rankings; 14 (Note: Teams are invited by World Team Rankings but BWF rule at that time ensured that there will be at least 3 Asian teams, 3 European teams, and 1 each from the remaining continents.)					
2016–present	16	Champions & host 2	Asian; 4 (Note: If the defending champion or host nation occupied qualifying slot(s), the slot will be allocated to the highest ranked team(s) from Asia.)	European; 4 (Note: If the defending champion or host nation occupied qualifying slot(s), the slot will be allocated to the highest ranked team(s) from Europe.)	African; 1	Oceanian; 1	Pan American; 1	From BWF World Team Rankings; 3

== Results ==
=== 1949–1982 ===
Year	Host	Final		
Year	Host	Champions	Score	Runners-up
1949; Details	Preston, England	Malaya	8–1	Denmark
1952; Details	Singapore	Malaya	7–2	United States
1955; Details	Singapore	Malaya	8–1	Denmark
1958; Details	Singapore	Indonesia	6–3	Malaya
1961; Details	Jakarta, Indonesia	Indonesia	6–3	Thailand
1964; Details	Tokyo, Japan	Indonesia	5–4	Denmark
1967; Details	Jakarta, Indonesia	Malaysia	6–3	Indonesia
1970; Details	Kuala Lumpur, Malaysia	Indonesia	7–2	Malaysia
1973; Details	Jakarta, Indonesia	Indonesia	8–1	Denmark
1976; Details	Bangkok, Thailand	Indonesia	9–0	Malaysia
1979; Details	Jakarta, Indonesia	Indonesia	9–0	Denmark
1982; Details	London, England	China	5–4	Indonesia

=== 1984–1988 ===
Year	Host	Final			Third place tie		
Year	Host	Champions	Score	Runners-up	Third place	Score	Fourth place
1984; Details	Kuala Lumpur, Malaysia	Indonesia	3–2	China	England	3–2	South Korea
1986; Details	Jakarta, Indonesia	China	3–2	Indonesia	Malaysia	3–2	Denmark
1988; Details	Kuala Lumpur, Malaysia	China	4–1	Malaysia	Indonesia	5–0	Denmark

=== 1990–present ===
Year	Host	Final			Semi-finalists	
Year	Host	Champions	Score	Runners-up	Semi-finalists	
1990; Details	Nagoya and Tokyo, Japan	China	4–1	Malaysia	Denmark	Indonesia
1992; Details	Kuala Lumpur, Malaysia	Malaysia	3–2	Indonesia	China	South Korea
1994; Details	Jakarta, Indonesia	Indonesia	3–0	Malaysia	South Korea	China
1996; Details	Hong Kong	Indonesia	5–0	Denmark	China	South Korea
1998; Details	Hong Kong SAR, China	Indonesia	3–2	Malaysia	Denmark	China
2000; Details	Kuala Lumpur, Malaysia	Indonesia	3–0	China	South Korea	Denmark
2002; Details	Guangzhou, China	Indonesia	3–2	Malaysia	Denmark	China
2004; Details	Jakarta, Indonesia	China	3–1	Denmark	Indonesia	South Korea
2006; Details	Sendai and Tokyo, Japan	China	3–0	Denmark	Indonesia	Malaysia
2008; Details	Jakarta, Indonesia	China	3–1	South Korea	Malaysia	Indonesia
2010; Details	Kuala Lumpur, Malaysia	China	3–0	Indonesia	Malaysia	Japan
2012; Details	Wuhan, China	China	3–0	South Korea	Japan	Denmark
2014; Details	New Delhi, India	Japan	3–2	Malaysia	Indonesia	China
2016; Details	Kunshan, China	Denmark	3–2	Indonesia	South Korea	Malaysia
2018; Details	Bangkok, Thailand	China	3–1	Japan	Indonesia	Denmark
2020; Details	Aarhus, Denmark	Indonesia	3–0	China	Denmark	Japan
2022; Details	Bangkok, Thailand	India	3–0	Indonesia	Denmark	Japan
2024; Details	Chengdu, China	China	3–1	Indonesia	Malaysia	Chinese Taipei
2026; Details	Horsens, Denmark	China	3–1	France	Denmark	India

== Successful national teams ==
Only six nations have won the Thomas Cup: Indonesia, China, Malaysia, Japan, Denmark, and India. Malaya (1949), Indonesia (1958), and China (1982) each won the championship in their inaugural tournament appearances.

=== Title winners ===
- Indonesia: The most successful nation in tournament history with 14 titles and 22 final appearances. Indonesia's title runs include four consecutive championships from 1970 to 1979 and five consecutive titles from 1994 to 2002.
- China: Has captured 12 titles since its debut in 1982, including five consecutive championships between 2004 and 2012. China has reached the semifinal stage or better in all tournament appearances except 2016 and 2022.
- Malaysia: Has won five titles (1949, 1952, 1955, 1967, and 1992) and reached the final tie on 14 occasions, holding the record for most runner-up finishes with nine.
- Japan: Captured its sole title in 2014 by defeating Malaysia 3–2 in the final tie.
- Denmark: Won its first championship in 2016 with a 3–2 victory over Indonesia, becoming the first European and only non-Asian nation to win the Thomas Cup. Denmark had previously finished as runner-up eight times between 1949 and 2006 and is the only nation to qualify for the final stage in all 34 tournament editions.
- India: Won its first title in 2022 by defeating Indonesia 3–0 in the final tie.

=== Other performing nations ===
- South Korea: Reached the final tie twice (2008 and 2012) and has placed in the top four on nine occasions.
- United States, Thailand, and France: Each achieved a best result of runner-up, finishing second in 1952, 1961, and 2026, respectively.
- England: Achieved its best result with a third-place finish in 1984.
- Chinese Taipei: Reached the semifinals in 2024.

Below is the list of ten nations that have finished in the top four in the Thomas Cup. Bold text denotes team was host country.

Team	Champions	Runners-up	Semi-finalists	Third place	Fourth place	Top 4 total
Indonesia	14 (1958, **1961**, 1964, 1970, **1973**, 1976, **1979**, 1984, **1994**, 1996, 1998, 2000, 2002, 2020)	8 (**1967**, 1982, **1986**, 1992, 2010, 2016, 2022, 2024)	6 (1990, **2004**, 2006, **2008**, 2014, 2018)	1 (1988)	—N/a	29
China	12 (1982, 1986, 1988, 1990, 2004, 2006, 2008, 2010, **2012**, 2018, **2024**, 2026)	3 (1984, 2000, 2020)	6 (1992, 1994, 1996, 1998, **2002**, 2014)	—N/a	—N/a	21
Malaysia (Note: Including results representing Federation of Malaya.)	5 (1949, 1952, 1955, 1967, **1992**)	9 (1958, **1970**, 1976, **1988**, 1990, 1994, 1998, 2002, 2014)	5 (2006, 2008, **2010**, 2016, 2024)	1 (1986)	—N/a	20
Denmark	1 (2016)	8 (1949, 1955, 1964, 1973, 1979, 1996, 2004, 2006)	8 (1990, 1998, 2002, 2012, 2018, **2020**, 2022, **2026**)	—N/a	2 (1986, 1988)	19
Japan	1 (2014)	1 (2018)	4 (2010, 2012, 2020, 2022)	—N/a	—N/a	6
India	1 (2022)	—N/a	1 (2026)	—N/a	—N/a	2
South Korea	—N/a	2 (2008, 2012)	6 (1992, 1994, 1996, 2000, 2004, 2016)	—N/a	1 (1984)	9
United States	—N/a	1 (1952)	—N/a	—N/a	—N/a	1
Thailand	—N/a	1 (1961)	—N/a	—N/a	—N/a	1
France	—N/a	1 (2026)	—N/a	—N/a	—N/a	1
England	—N/a	—N/a	—N/a	1 (1984)	—N/a	1
Chinese Taipei	—N/a	—N/a	1 (2024)	—N/a	—N/a	1

== Team appearances at the final stages ==
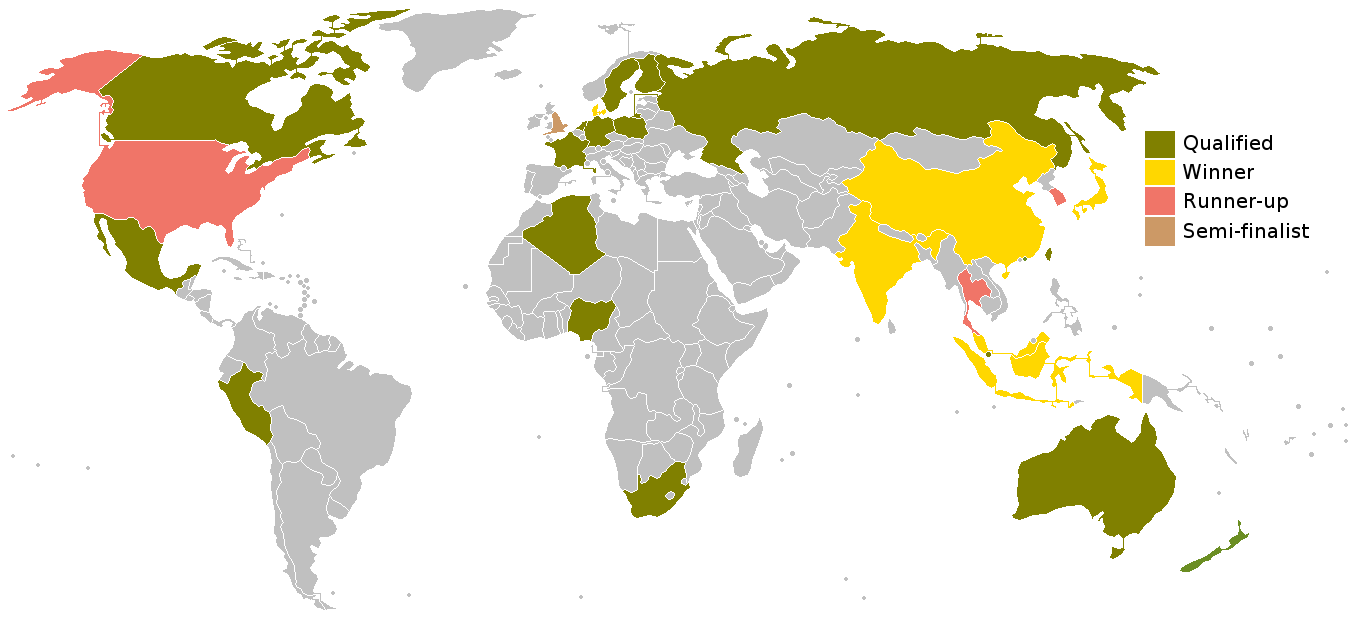
The map shows countries that have qualified at least once for the Thomas Cup finale

As of the 2026 championship, 30 teams have advanced to the final tournaments over the competition's history. Among them, Denmark has reached this final stage in all 34 competitions (and without ever receiving a bye to it). Indonesia and China have also advanced to the final stage in each competition that they have entered. Geographically, 10 Asian and European teams have qualified to play at the final venue. The United States, Canada, Peru and Mexico are the only Pan-American teams to have reached this stage, while New Zealand, Australia and Tahiti have been the only teams to represent Oceania. South Africa, Nigeria, and Algeria are the three teams which have qualified from the African zone.

Below is the list of teams that have appeared in the final stage of Thomas Cup as of the 2026 tournament.

Teams	Region	Appearances	Debut	Best Result
Denmark	Europe	34	1949	Champions
Malaysia	Asia	31	1949	Champions
Indonesia	Asia	31	1958	Champions
China	Asia	23	1982	Champions
South Korea	Asia	22	1984	Runners-up
Japan	Asia	18	1964	Champions
Thailand	Asia	17	1958	Runners-up
England	Europe	17	1982	Semi-finals
India	Asia	15	1952	Champions
Germany	Europe	12	2002	Quarter-finals
Sweden	Europe	11	1984	Group stage
United States	Americas	10	1949	Runners-up
Canada	Americas	10	1970	Semi-finals
Chinese Taipei	Asia	7	2014	Semi-finals
Australia	Oceania	6	1955	Group stage
New Zealand	Oceania	6	1970	Group stage
Hong Kong	Asia	6	1996	Quarter-finals
France	Europe	6	2014	Runners-up
Algeria	Africa	5	2018	Group stage
South Africa	Africa	4	2004	Group stage
Singapore	Asia	3	1986	Group stage
Nigeria	Africa	3	2008	Group stage
Russia	Europe	3	2012	Quarter-finals
Finland	Europe	2	1994	Group stage
Netherlands	Europe	2	1998	Group stage
Peru	Americas	1	2010	Group stage
Poland	Europe	1	2010	Group stage
Mexico	Americas	1	2016	Group stage
Tahiti	Oceania	1	2020	Group stage
Czech Republic	Europe	1	2024	Group stage
