= 1949 Thomas Cup =

Tournament details
- Dates: 22 – 26 February 1949
- Edition: 1st
- Level: International
- Nations: 3
- Venue: Kelvin Hall; Queen's Hall
- Location: Glasgow, Scotland; Preston, England

The 1949 Thomas Cup was the inaugural tournament of Thomas Cup, the most important men's badminton team competition in the world.

The tournament was originally planned for 1941–1942 (badminton seasons in the northern hemisphere traditionally ran from the autumn of one calendar year to the spring of the next), but was delayed when World War II exploded across the continents. Sir George's dream was finally realized in 1948-1949 when ten national teams participated in the first Thomas Cup competition.

== Qualification ==
Three qualifying zones were established: Pan America, Europe, and the Pacific; though Malaya (now Malaysia and Singapore) was the only Pacific zone participant. In a format that would last until 1984, all ties (matches between nations) would consist of nine individual matches; the victorious nation needing to win at least five of these contests. The top two singles player of each side faced both of the top two players for the opposite side, accounting for four matches. A fifth singles match took place between the third ranked singles players for each team. Finally, two doubles pairings for each side played both of the doubles pairings of the opposite side, accounting for four more matches. Each tie was normally contested over two days, four matches on the first day and five on the next. The United States and Denmark won their respective zone qualifications and thus joined Malaya for the inter-zone ties.

Means of qualification	Date	Venue	Slot	Qualified teams
Pacific Zone	–	–	1	Malaya (Note: Malaya automatically qualified for the Thomas Cup finals by being the only representative in the Pacific Zone.)
American Zone	5 – 13 December 1948	Toronto; Pasadena, CA	1	United States
European Zone	3 November 1948 – 21 January 1949	Copenhagen; Ilford; Leicester	1	Denmark
Total			3	

== Knockout stage ==
The inter-zone ties were held in the United Kingdom. As the tournament used a knockout system, rather than a round-robin system, Denmark was given a bye in the first round. Malaya defeated the USA 6–3 in a highly competitive match played in Glasgow, Scotland (none of the players on either side had ever seen any of the players on the other side play before). Of note, this tie marked the first of only three ever matches between the USA's Dave Freeman and Malaya's (Note: The nation of Malaya is distinct from modern-day Malaysia, as at the time the team consisted of players from both Malaysia and Singapore in a single nation.) Wong Peng Soon the two greatest singles players of the early post-war period. In the final round held in Preston, England, Malaya beat Denmark 8–1 and became the first nation to win a Thomas Cup.

=== Bracket ===
Semi-finals
21 February 1949 – Glasgow
Malaya	6
United States	3
Bye
Denmark

Final
25 February 1949 – Preston
Malaya	8
Denmark	1

=== Semi-finals ===
21 February 1949
22 February 1949

Malaya	6–3	United States
Report

Kelvin Hall, Glasgow

=== Final ===
25 February 1949
26 February 1949

Malaya	8–1	Denmark
Report

Queen's Hall, Preston

1949 Thomas Cup winner

Malaya
First title
