= List of German Open Women's Singles champions in badminton =

Singles:
- Men | Women

Doubles:
- Men | Women | Mixed

Below is the list of the winners at the German Open in badminton in Women's singles.

1955	(Denmark) Hanne Jensen	(Denmark) Annelise Hansen	1-11, 11–2, 11–2
1956	(Denmark) Inger Kjærgaard	(Denmark) Hanne Roest	11-9, 11-6
1957	(Denmark) Inger Kjærgaard	(Denmark) Hanne Jensen	11–4, 11–9
1958	(Germany) Gisela Ellermann	(Germany) Hannelore Schmidt	11–6, 11–7
1959	(Denmark) Aase Schiøtt Jacobsen	(Denmark) Agnete Friis	12–10, 11–1
1960	(Sweden) Eva Pettersson	(Denmark) Karin Rasmussen	4–11, 11–1, 11–5
1961	(United States) Judy Hashman	(New Zealand) Sonia Cox	11-1, 11-3
1962	(United States) Judy Hashman	(Denmark) Tonny Holst-Christensen	11-2, 11-3
1963	(United States) Judy Hashman	(Denmark) Ulla Rasmussen	12-10, 12-9
1964	(United States) Judy Hashman	(Denmark) Ulla Rasmussen	11-2, 11-3
1965	(England) Ursula Smith	(Germany) Irmgard Latz	7-11, 11-3, 11-2
1966	(Germany) Irmgard Latz	(Sweden) Eva Twedberg	11-8, 8-11, 12-9
1967	(Sweden) Eva Twedberg	(Denmark) Ulla Strand	11-2, 11-6
1968	(Sweden) Eva Twedberg	(Germany) Irmgard Latz	11-6, 9-11, 11-3
1969	(Denmark) Anne Flindt	(Sweden) Eva Twedberg	11-6, 11-4
1970	no competition		
1971	(Sweden) Eva Twedberg	(Germany) Irmgard Gerlatzka	11-3, 11-4
1972	(Sweden) Eva Twedberg	(Germany) Irmgard Gerlatzka	11-6, 11-4
1973	(Sweden) Eva Twedberg	(Denmark) Imre Rietveld Nielsen	11-7, 11-8
1974	(England) Margaret Beck	(Netherlands) Joke van Beusekom	11-1, 11-4
1975	(Netherlands) Joke van Beusekom	(Germany) Brigitte Steden	11–7, 3–11, 11–4
1976	(England) Gillian Gilks	(Denmark) Lene Køppen	5-11, 11-6, 11-6
1977	(England) Margaret Lockwood	(Germany) Brigitte Steden	11-7, 11-3
1978	(England) Jane Webster	(Netherlands) Marjan Ridder	11-3, 12-11
1979	no competition		
1980	(Denmark) Pia Nielsen	(England) Sally Leadbeater	11–7, 7–11, 11–2
1981	(Japan) Hiroe Yuki	(England) Sally Leadbeater	12-11, 11-9
1982	(China) Wu Dixi	(Denmark) Kirsten Larsen	11-9, 11-3
1983	(Denmark) Nettie Nielsen	(Denmark) Kirsten Larsen	11–12, 11–3, 11–4
1984	(England) Karen Beckman	(England) Helen Troke	9-12, 12-10, 11-6
1985	(China) Qian Ping	(China) Zheng Yuli	3-1, ret.
1986	(South Korea) Kim Yun-ja	(England) Helen Troke	11-1, 8-11, 12-10
1987	(China) Qian Ping	(Denmark) Charlotte Hattens	11-0, 11-2
1988	(China) Han Aiping	(Denmark) Kirsten Larsen	11-8, 11-9
1989	(England) Helen Troke	(Denmark) Pernille Nedergaard	4–11, 11–8, 11–7
1990	(Denmark) Pernille Nedergaard	(Denmark) Camilla Martin	12–9, 11–8
1991	(China) Huang Hua	(Denmark) Pernille Nedergaard	11–1, 6–11, 11–7
1992	(Indonesia) Susi Susanti	(Indonesia) Sarwendah Kusumawardhani	11–7, 10–12, 11–8
1993	(Indonesia) Susi Susanti	(China) Ye Zhaoying	11–6, 11–8
1994	(Sweden) Lim Xiaoqing	(China) Dai Yun	12–10, 11–4
1995	(Denmark) Camilla Martin	(Indonesia) Mia Audina	11–6, 11–6
1996	(China) Yao Jie	(Sweden) Margit Borg	11–1, 11–0
1997	(Denmark) Camilla Martin	(Sweden) Marina Andrievskaya	11–7, 11–2
1998	no competition		
1999	(China) Tang Chunyu	(Sweden) Marina Andrievskaya	7–11, 11–6, 11–2
2000	(China) Dong Fang	(China) Hu Ting	11–6, 11–3
2001	(France) Pi Hongyan	(Ukraine) Elena Nozdran	7–1, 7–5, 7–2
2002	(France) Pi Hongyan	(Netherlands) Yao Jie	4–11, 11–9, 11–7
2003	(China) Zhang Ning	(Denmark) Camilla Martin	11–7, 11–3
2004	(China) Xie Xingfang	(Germany) Xu Huaiwen	9–11, 11–6, 11–7
2005	(China) Xie Xingfang	(China) Zhang Ning	11–5, 11–4
2006	(China) Zhang Ning	(China) Lu Lan	11–8, 11–3
2007	(China) Xie Xingfang	(Germany) Xu Huaiwen	19-21, 21-12, 21-19
2008	(South Korea) Jun Jae-youn	(China) Wang Yihan	25-23, 21-10
2009	(China) Wang Yihan	(China) Zhu Lin	20-22, 21-13, 21-11
2010	(China) Wang Xin	(Germany) Juliane Schenk	21-17, 21-18
2011	(China) Liu Xin	(Japan) Ayane Kurihara	21-13, 15-21, 21-9
2012	(China) Li Xuerui	(Germany) Juliane Schenk	21-19, 21-16
2013	(China) Wang Yihan	(Germany) Juliane Schenk	21-14, 21-13
2014	(Japan) Sayaka Takahashi	(South Korea) Sung Ji-hyun	21-17, 8-21, 21-12
2015	(South Korea) Sung Ji-hyun	(Spain) Carolina Marín	21-15, 14-21, 21-6
2016	(China) Li Xuerui	(China) Wang Shixian	21-14, 21-17
2017	(Japan) Akane Yamaguchi	(Spain) Carolina Marín	w.o.
2018	(Japan) Akane Yamaguchi	(China) Chen Yufei	21-19, 6-21, 21-12
2019	(Japan) Akane Yamaguchi	(Thailand) Ratchanok Intanon	16-21, 21-14, 25-23
2020; 2021	no competition		
2022	(China) He Bingjiao	(China) Chen Yufei	21-14, 27-25
