= Iris Rogers =

English badminton player

- Rogers in 1963

Personal information
- Born: 1930 (age 95–96) Kensington, Greater London, England

Sport
- Country: England
- Sport: Badminton
Medal record
Women's badminton
Representing England
Uber Cup
Silver medal – second place	1963 Wilmington	Women's team
Commonwealth Games
Silver medal – second place	1966 Kingston	Women's doubles

Iris L. Rogers (née Cooley, born 1930) is a former English badminton player.

== Badminton career ==
Born Iris L Cooley she came to prominence in the early fifties when playing doubles. Partnering June Timperley née White the pair broke the stranglehold of the Danish pairs during the era of Danish domination by claiming three All England women's doubles titles. She also claimed an All England mixed doubles titles with John Best.

Although mainly concentrating on doubles Rogers was also a very good singles player reaching the final of the All England in 1954 before losing out to Judy Devlin. Other successes included nine Irish open titles, nine Scottish open titles, three Dutch opens, one Swedish open and one Danish open title.

She represented the England team and won a silver medal in the women's doubles with Angela Bairstow, at the 1966 British Empire and Commonwealth Games in Kingston, Jamaica.

== Personal life ==
She married in William Rogers in 1956 and competed as Rogers and not Cooley afterwards.

== Achievements ==
=== Commonwealth Games ===
Women's doubles
Year	Venue	Partner	Opponent	Score	Result
1966	Convention Hall, Kingston, Jamaica	(England) Angela Bairstow	(England) Jenny Horton (England) Ursula Smith	7–15, 7–15	Silver

=== International tournaments (27 titles, 21 runners-up) ===
Women's singles
Year	Tournament	Opponent	Score	Result
1953	Irish Open	(England) June White	11–8, 11–4	(gold) Winner
1954	Scottish Open	(England) Elisabeth O'Beirne	0–11, 11–3, 12–11	(gold) Winner
1954	Irish Open	(New Zealand) Heather Robson	7–11, 2–11	(silver) Runner-up
1954	All England Open	(United States) Judy Devlin	7–11, 5–11	(silver) Runner-up
1955	Scottish Open	(England) June Timperley	11–8, 11–3	(gold) Winner
1955	Irish Open	(Republic of Ireland) Sheila Moore	11–1, 11–2	(gold) Winner
1956	Scottish Open	(England) Heather Ward	6–11, 11–4, 11–5	(gold) Winner
1957	Irish Open	(England) Heather Ward	12–9, 11–12, 11–1	(gold) Winner
1957	Swedish Open	(Denmark) Inger Kjærgaard	11–4, 5–11, 8–11	(silver) Runner-up
1958	Scottish Open	(England) Heather Ward	11–6, 3–11, 4–11	(silver) Runner-up
1958	Dutch Open	(England) June Timperley	11–4, 11–8	(gold) Winner
1959	Irish Open	(England) Heather Ward	4–11, 8–11	(silver) Runner-up

Women's doubles
Year	Tournament	Partner	Opponent	Score	Result
1953	Denmark Open	(England) June White	(Denmark) Aase Schiøtt Jacobsen (Denmark) Marie Ussing	17–16, 15–1	(gold) Winner
1953	Irish Open	(England) June White	(England) Elisabeth O'Beirne (England) Audrey Stone	15–11, 15–11	(gold) Winner
1953	All England Open	(England) June White	(Denmark) Agnete Friis (Denmark) Marie Ussing	11–15, 15–2, 15–9	(gold) Winner
1954	Scottish Open	(England) June White	(Scotland) Nancy Horner (Scotland) I. S. Vallance	15–10, 15–9	(gold) Winner
1954	Irish Open	(England) June White	(Scotland) Nancy Horner (Scotland) J. C. Smart	15–7, 15–4	(gold) Winner
1954	All England Open	(England) June White	(United States) Judy Devlin (United States) Susan Devlin	7–15, 15–12, 8–15	(silver) Runner-up
1955	Scottish Open	(England) June Timperley	(Scotland) E. Tyre (Scotland) Wilma Tyre	15–5, 15–2	(gold) Winner
1955	Irish Open	(England) June Timperley	(England) Elisabeth O'Beirne (England) Audrey Stone	15–11, 15–10	(gold) Winner
1955	All England Open	(England) June Timperley	(United States) Judy Devlin (United States) Susan Devlin	18–15, 10–15, 15–9	(gold) Winner
1956	Scottish Open	(England) June Timperley	(England) M. Crockett (England) Heather Ward	15–7, 15–3	(gold) Winner
1956	All England Open	(England) June Timperley	(United States) Judy Devlin (United States) Susan Devlin	18–17, 12–15, 12–15	(silver) Runner-up
1957	Irish Open	(England) June Timperley	(England) Barbara Carpenter (England) Heather Ward	18–13, 11–15, 15–2	(gold) Winner
1957	Swedish Open	(England) June Timperley	(Denmark) Hanne Roest (England) Heather Ward	15–2, 15–7	(gold) Winner
1957	All England Open	(England) June Timperley	(Denmark) Kirsten Granlund (Denmark) Anni Hammergaard Hansen	15–7, 11–15, 10–15	(silver) Runner-up
1958	Scottish Open	(England) June Timperley	(England) Barbara Carpenter (England) Heather Ward	15–13, 15–7	(gold) Winner
1958	Dutch Open	(England) June Timperley	(Denmark) Agnete Friis (Denmark) Inger Kjærgaard	15–5, 15–5	(gold) Winner
1958	All England Open	(England) June Timperley	(United States) Margaret Varner Bloss (England) Heather Ward	12–15, 2–15	(silver) Runner-up
1959	Irish Open	(England) June Timperley	(England) Barbara Carpenter (England) Heather Ward	15–6, 15–7	(gold) Winner
1959	All England Open	(England) June Timperley	(United States) Judy Devlin (United States) Susan Devlin	11–15, 15–10, 15–11	(gold) Winner
1962	Scottish Open	(England) Jenny Pritchard	(England) Margaret Barrand (England) Ursula Smith	14–18, 15–10, 1–15	(silver) Runner-up
1963	Irish Open	(England) Angela Bairstow	(England) Brenda Parr (England) Jenny Pritchard	9–15, 10–15	(silver) Runner-up
1965	Irish Open	(England) Margaret Barrand	(England) Jenny Pritchard (England) Ursula Smith	8–15, 10–15	(silver) Runner-up
1966	Scottish Open	(England) Jenny Horton	(England) Angela Bairstow (England) Margaret Barrand	10–15, 9–15	(silver) Runner-up
1967	Irish Open	(England) Gillian Perrin	(England) Margaret Boxall (England) Susan Pound	8–15, 7–15	(silver) Runner-up

Mixed doubles
Year	Tournament	Partner	Opponent	Score	Result
1953	Irish Open	(Malaysia) David Choong	(Malaysia) Eddy Choong (England) June White	6–15, 6–15	(silver) Runner-up
1954	Scottish Open	(England) John Best	(England) Tony Jordan (England) June White	18–14, 2–15, 9–15	(silver) Runner-up
1954	All England Open	(England) John Best	(Denmark) Finn Kobberø (Denmark) Inge Birgit Hansen	15–12, 15–0	(gold) Winner
1955	Scottish Open	(England) John Best	(England) Tony Jordan (England) June Timperley	15–7, 3–15, 15–10	(gold) Winner
1956	Scottish Open	(England) John Best	(England) Tony Jordan (England) June Timperley	15–12, 10–15, 8–15	(silver) Runner-up
1957	Irish Open	(England) John Best	(England) Tony Jordan (England) June Timperley	15–11, 17–18, 6–15	(silver) Runner-up
1957	Swedish Open	(England) John Best	(England) Tony Jordan (England) June Timperley	14–17, 3–15	(silver) Runner-up
1958	Scottish Open	(England) John Best	(England) Tony Jordan (England) June Timperley	15–9, 15–8	(gold) Winner
1958	Dutch Open	(England) Hugh Findlay	(England) John Timperley (England) June Timperley	15–12, 15–12	(gold) Winner
1959	Irish Open	(England) Ronald Lockwood	(England) Tony Jordan (England) June Timperley	10–15, 7–15	(silver) Runner-up
1963	Irish Open	(England) W. C. E. Rogers	(England) Kenneth Derrick (England) Margaret Barrand	9–15, 15–4, 11–15	(silver) Runner-up
1967	Irish Open	(England) Roger Mills	(England) Tony Jordan (England) Angela Bairstow	15–5, 15–11	(gold) Winner
