= Eddy Choong =

Malaysian badminton player

Eddy Choong 庄友明
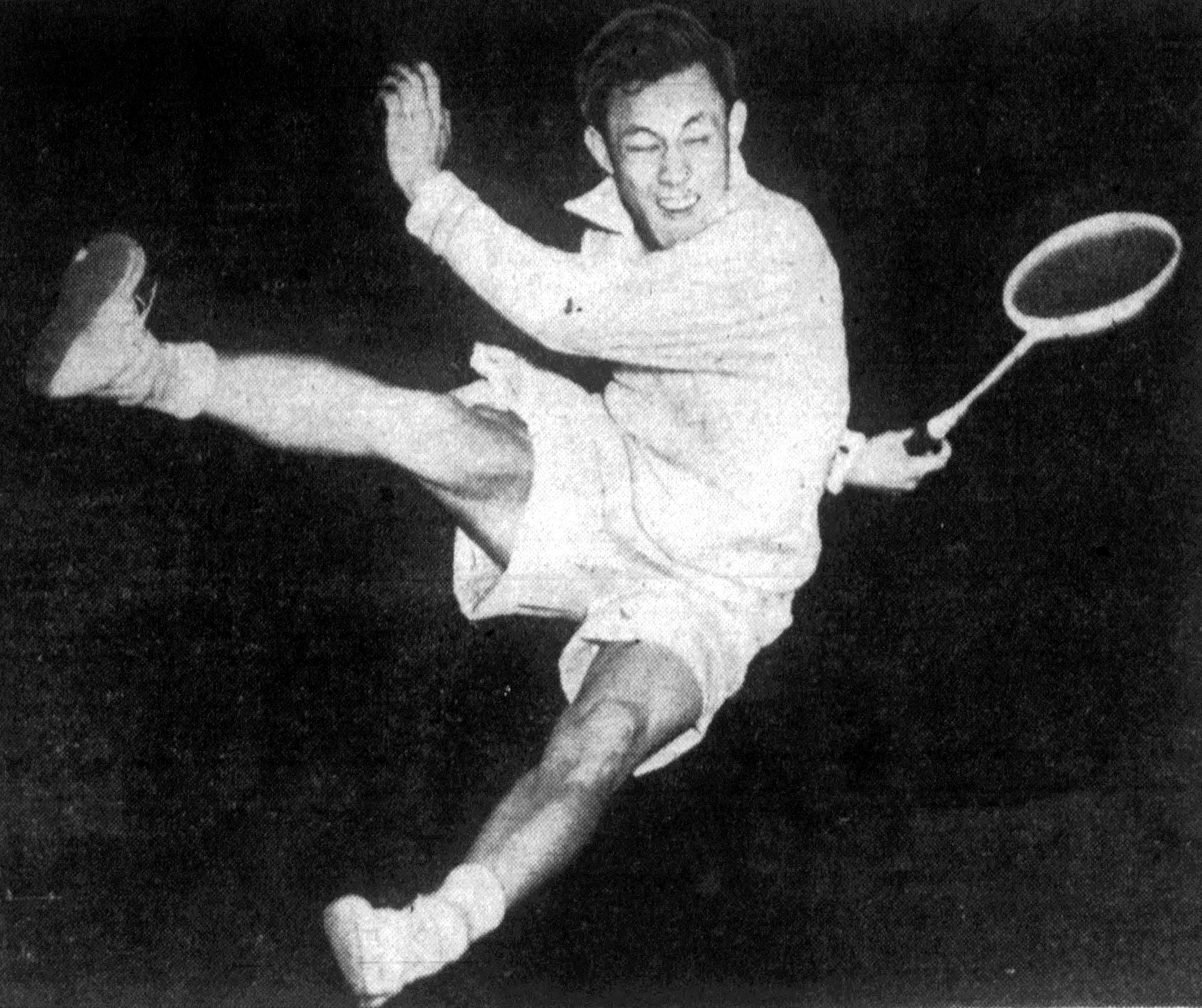
- Choong, circa 1953

Personal information
- Born: Choong Ewe Beng; 29 May 1931 Penang, British Malaya
- Died: 28 January 2013 (aged 81) George Town, Penang, Malaysia
- Height: 1.62 m (5 ft 4 in)

Sport
- Country: Malaya; Malaysia
- Sport: Badminton
- Handedness: Right
- Event: Men's singles, men's and mixed doubles
Medal record
Men's badminton
Representing Malaya
Thomas Cup
Gold medal – first place	1955 Singapore	Team
Silver medal – second place	1958 Singapore	Team
Representing Malaysia
Asian Games
Silver medal – second place	1966 Bangkok	Mixed doubles
Silver medal – second place	1966 Bangkok	Men's team

Eddy Choong
- Traditional Chinese: 莊友明
- Simplified Chinese: 庄友明
Transcriptions
Standard Mandarin
- Hanyu Pinyin: Zhuāng You Míng
Yue: Cantonese
- Jyutping: Zong1 Jau5 Ming4
Southern Min
- Hokkien POJ: Chng Iú-bêng

Dato' Choong Ewe Beng DSPN (29 May 1931 – 28 January 2013) was a Malaysian badminton player. He was David Choong's brother and they played men's doubles together.

== Early life ==
Choong Ewe Beng, also known as Eddy, was born on 29 May 1931, and was the third son of a wealthy family in Penang. His parents were named Dato' Choong Eng Hai and Datin Ho Guat Im.

Choong first went to primary and secondary school in Penang before moving to England at the turn of the 1950s to study law and medicine. His passion for the sport quickly eclipsed his studies and Eddy later said his studies were “long forgotten”.

In the UK, Eddie was much attracted to the Jim Russell School of racing driving and enrolled, but parental pressure forced him to re-think his priorities. However, his passion for driving took him to other aspects of motor sports, and when back on Penang, he revelled in grass track, hill climbs and karting. He was extremely active in introducing the "Penang Karting Grand Prix" in Georgetown, which attracted karters from all over the Far East.

In 1966, with the All-England men's Singles and Doubles titles being won by Malaysians, an exhibition match was arranged at the Georgetown Chinese Girls' High School, with the pinnacle match being between the then current doubles champions, Ng Boon Bee and Tan Yee Khan, and Tan Aik Huang and Eddie Choong.

== Career ==
Measuring at 1.62 metres (5 ft 4 in), Eddy was smaller than most of his European competitors but he made up for the height difference with endless energy and amazing acrobatic jumps that triggered a running gag about Eddy hiding springs in his shoes. Eddy was considered to be one of the first athletes to do a jump smash. His trademark shot was known as the “Airborne Kill”.

He won hundreds of regional titles and over 65 international titles in all three disciplines from 1949 to 1966. Eddy won many of these titles partnering his brother, David Choong, and his cousin, Amy Choong. Thirty of his international titles were gained from 1951 to 1953.

Choong won the men's singles at the All England Open Badminton Championships four times between 1953 and 1957 when it was considered the unofficial world championship of the sport. He also reached the All-England singles final in 1952 and 1955 and won the men's doubles with his brother in 1951, 1952, and 1953. He was a member of the 1955 Malayan Thomas Cup (men's international) team which retained the world team championship, and the 1958 team which surrendered the title to Indonesia

== After retirement ==
Eddy settled in his native Penang for his retirement. After badminton, he bred dogs and raced fast cars and go-karts. He was a good driver and made a name for himself in motor racing after winning many titles from 1967 to 1982. Eddy was also the chairman of the Hock Hin Brothers Group which was his family business in real estate and housing development. Additionally, Eddy was involved at a high level in kennel associations in Malaysia.

In 1995, Eddy became the vice-president of the Penang Badminton Association and chairman of the Badminton Association of Malaysia Technical Advisory Panel. He focused on developing badminton in his native Penang. Choong used his own money to convert a family factory into Penang's first indoor badminton stadium. He later invested 1.5 million MYR to build the Penang International Badminton Hall. It opened in 1992.

== Racial issues ==
Eddy was also a strong promoter of racial equality. Partially due to bad experiences during his childhood, Eddy was sensitive to racial issues. Eddy saw his performances in badminton as a way of showing that all races can be equally good at sport.

At the 1956 All England, he refused to attend the traditional celebration dinner because he felt the organisers treated him unfairly due to racial discrimination. On another occasion, Jørn Skaarup of Denmark gave away a match to Choong in which he felt the Malaysian was treated unfairly. Skaarup earned Choong's respect and friendship with his fair play.

== Personal life ==
In 1959, Eddy married Maggie Thean Sun Lin. Together, they had 4 sons – Finn, Lionel, Antonio and Jorgen. His eldest son, Finn, and third son, Jorgen, were named after Eddy's longtime badminton rivals and friends, Finn Kobero and Jorgen Hamergard Hansan, respectively.

== Death ==
Eddy died on 28 January 2013 at the age of 82.

== Awards ==
In 1994, Eddy won the Herbert Scheele award and was inducted into the IBF Hall of Fame in 1997.

Eddy made such an influence on the game that the IBF named an award after him: The Eddie Choong Player of the Year. This award was given to players who achieved exceptional results during a given year. Peter Gade was the first player to win this award in 1998. In 2008, the award was renamed the Eddie Choong Most Promising Player of the Year and given to the player who showed to be the most promising during a calendar year.

== Honours ==
- Penang
  - Lieutenant of the Order of the Defender of State (D.S.P.N.) – Dato' (1996)

== Achievements ==
=== Asian Games ===
Mixed doubles
Year	Venue	Partner	Opponent	Score	Result
1966	Kittikachorn Stadium, Bangkok, Thailand	(Malaysia) Tan Gaik Bee	(Malaysia) Teh Kew San (Malaysia) Rosalind Singha Ang	13–18, 15–11, 5–15	Silver

=== International tournaments (54 titles, 24 runners-up) ===
Men's singles
Year	Tournament	Opponent	Score	Result
1951	Denmark Open	(Malaysia) Wong Peng Soon	8–15, 5–15	(silver) Runner-up
1951	Scottish Open	(Republic of Ireland) Frank Peard	15–11, 15–6	(gold) Winner
1951	Irish International	(Malaysia) Cheong Hock Leng	15–5, 15–12	(gold) Winner
1952	Scottish Open	(Malaysia) Johnny Heah	11–15, 8–15	(silver) Runner-up
1952	Irish International	(Malaysia) Johnny Heah	15–7, 15–11	(gold) Winner
1952	All England	(Malaysia) Wong Peng Soon	11–15, 13–18	(silver) Runner-up
1952	French Open	(Malaysia) David Choong	15–5, 15–8	(gold) Winner
1953	Scottish Open	(Republic of Ireland) Frank Peard	15–12, 15–10	(gold) Winner
1953	Irish International	(England) John D. McColl	15–2, 15–0	(gold) Winner
1953	All England	(Malaysia) Johnny Heah	15–4, 15–4	(gold) Winner
1953	Denmark Open	(Denmark) Finn Kobberø	15–3, 15–7	(gold) Winner
1953	French Open	(Malaysia) David Choong	15–3, 15–7	(gold) Winner
1954	Dutch Open	(Denmark) Jørn Skaarup	15–9, 15–10	(gold) Winner
1954	All England	(Canada) Donald Smythe	15–5, 15–6	(gold) Winner
1954	U.S. Open	(United States) Joe Alston	15–5, 2–15, 15–13	(gold) Winner
1954	Norwegian International	(Malaysia) David Choong	15–5, 15–6	(gold) Winner
1955	Dutch Open	(Denmark) Ole Mertz	15–5, 15–0	(gold) Winner
1955	German Open	(Malaysia) David Choong	15–3, 9–15, 18–13	(gold) Winner
1955	All England	(Malaysia) Wong Peng Soon	7–15, 17–14, 10–15	(silver) Runner-up
1955	U.S. Open	(United States) Joe Alston	5–15, 8–15	(silver) Runner-up
1956	Swiss Open	(Malaysia) David Choong	15–7, 15–1	(gold) Winner
1956	German Open	(Indonesia) Ferry Sonneville	15–6, 15–0	(gold) Winner
1956	All England	(Denmark) Finn Kobberø	11–15, 15–3, 15–11	(gold) Winner
1957	Scottish Open	(Malaysia) Oon Chong Teik	15–5, 15–8	(gold) Winner
1957	Irish International	(Malaysia) Oon Chong Teik	15–7, 15–12	(gold) Winner
1957	Dutch Open	(Malaysia) Oon Chong Teik	15–8, 15–2	(gold) Winner
1957	All England	(Denmark) Erland Kops	15–9, 15–3	(gold) Winner
1957	German Open	(Indonesia) Ferry Sonneville	15–12, 15–12	(gold) Winner
1957	Malaysia Open	(Malaysia) Abdullah Piruz	15–6, 15–3	(gold) Winner
1957	U.S. Open	(Denmark) Finn Kobberø	10–15, 15–2, 4–15	(silver) Runner-up
1960	Malaysia Open	(Indonesia) Eddy Yusuf	15–13, 15–9	(gold) Winner

Men's doubles
Year	Tournament	Partner	Opponent	Score	Result
1951	Scottish Open	(Malaysia) David Choong	(Republic of Ireland) Frank Peard (Republic of Ireland) Jim FitzGibbon	15–12, 15–4	(gold) Winner
1951	All England	(Malaysia) David Choong	(Malaysia) Ong Poh Lim (Malaysia) Ismail Marjan	9–15, 15–7, 15–10	(gold) Winner
1951	French Open	(Malaysia) Cheong Hock Leng	(Malaysia) Ong Poh Lim (Malaysia) Ismail Marjan	7–15, 7–15	(silver) Runner-up
1952	Scottish Open	(Malaysia) David Choong	(Scotland) Robert Hodge (Scotland) Wilfred Robinson	15–5, 15–1	(gold) Winner
1952	All England	(Malaysia) David Choong	(Denmark) Poul Holm (Denmark) Ole Jensen	9–15, 15–12, 15–7	(gold) Winner
1952	Irish International	(Malaysia) David Choong	(Malaysia) Johnny Heah (Republic of Ireland) Jim FitzGibbon	15–11, 15–5	(gold) Winner
1952	French Open	(Malaysia) David Choong	(France) Henri Pellizza (France) Paul Ailloud	15–2, 15–5	(gold) Winner
1953	Scottish Open	(Malaysia) David Choong	(Republic of Ireland) Frank Peard (Republic of Ireland) Jim FitzGibbon	15–12, 15–12	(gold) Winner
1953	Irish International	(Malaysia) David Choong	(Republic of Ireland) Frank Peard (Republic of Ireland) Jim FitzGibbon	15–8, 15–3	(gold) Winner
1953	All England	(Malaysia) David Choong	(Denmark) Poul Holm (Denmark) Ole Jensen	15–5, 15–12	(gold) Winner
1953	Denmark Open	(Malaysia) David Choong	(Denmark) Poul Holm (Denmark) Ole Jensen	15–6, 15–9	(gold) Winner
1953	French Open	(Malaysia) David Choong	(England) Peter Birtwistle (India) S. L. Jaini	15–9, 15–6	(gold) Winner
1954	All England	(Malaysia) David Choong	(Malaysia) Ong Poh Lim (Malaysia) Ooi Teik Hock	16–18, 12–15	(silver) Runner-up
1954	U.S. Open	(Malaysia) David Choong	(Malaysia) Ong Poh Lim (Malaysia) Ooi Teik Hock	1–15, 4–15	(silver) Runner-up
1954	Norwegian International	(Malaysia) David Choong	(Denmark) Leif Jensen (Denmark) Benny Andersen	15–2, 15–0	(gold) Winner
1955	Dutch Open	(Malaysia) David Choong	(Denmark) A. Lillelund (Denmark) Ole Mertz	15–8, 15–3	(gold) Winner
1955	German Open	(Malaysia) David Choong	(Denmark) Erland Olsen (Denmark) Niels Buchholst	15–2, 15–2	(gold) Winner
1955	All England	(Malaysia) David Choong	(Denmark) Finn Kobberø (Denmark) Jørgen Hammergaard Hansen	9–15, 17–14, 11–15	(silver) Runner-up
1955	U.S. Open	(Canada) T. Darryl Thompson	(United States) Joe Alston (United States) Wynn Rogers	6–15, 15–12, 8–15	(silver) Runner-up
1956	Swiss Open	(Malaysia) Robert Lim	(Malaysia) David Choong (Malaysia) Richard Lee	16–18, 13–15	(silver) Runner-up
1957	Scottish Open	(Malaysia) Oon Chong Teik	(Republic of Ireland) Frank Peard (Republic of Ireland) Jim FitzGibbon	15–0, 15–12	(gold) Winner
1957	Irish International	(Malaysia) Oon Chong Teik	(England) John Best (England) Tony Jordan	15–7, 15–8	(gold) Winner
1957	Dutch Open	(Malaysia) Oon Chong Teik	(England) John Timperley (England) Hugh Findlay	18–15, 15–18, 15–2	(gold) Winner
1957	All England	(Malaysia) David Choong	(United States) Joe Alston (Malaysia) Johnny Heah	10–15, 17–16, 5–15	(silver) Runner-up
1957	German Open	(Malaysia) David Choong	(Indonesia) Ferry Sonneville (Denmark) Arne Rasmussen	15–9, 17–18, 15–9	(gold) Winner
1957	U.S. Open	(Canada) Bert Fergus	(Denmark) Finn Kobberø (Denmark) Jørgen Hammergaard Hansen	12–15, 2–15	(silver) Runner-up
1959	Malaysia Open	(Denmark) Erland Kops	(Malaysia) Teh Kew San (Malaysia) Lim Say Hup	11–15, 9–15	(silver) Runner-up
1966	Malaysia Open	(Malaysia) Tan Aik Huang	(Thailand) Sangob Rattanusorn (Thailand) Chavalert Chumkum	17–14, 15–12	(gold) Winner
1966	Singapore Open	(Malaysia) Yew Cheng Hoe	(Malaysia) Tan Yee Khan (Malaysia) Khor Cheng Chye	15–13, 8–15, 15–2	(gold) Winner

Mixed doubles
Year	Tournament	Partner	Opponent	Score	Result
1949	Malaysia Open	(Malaysia) Amy Choong	(Malaysia) Chan Kon Leong (Malaysia) Valentine Chan	15–9, 11–15, 15–7	(gold) Winner
1951	Irish International	(Malaysia) Amy Choong	(Republic of Ireland) Frank Peard (England) Queenie Webber	15–9, 15–6	(gold) Winner
1951	French Open	(England) Queenie Webber	(Malaysia) Cheong Hock Leng (England) Audrey Stone	15–7, 15–7	(gold) Winner
1952	French Open	(England) Queenie Webber	(Malaysia) David Choong (England) Mimi Wyatt	12–15, 15–1, 15–11	(gold) Winner
1953	Scottish Open	(Republic of Ireland) Dorothy Donaldson	(Malaysia) David Choong (Scotland) Nancy Horner	3–15, 7–15	(silver) Runner-up
1953	Irish International	(England) June White	(Malaysia) David Choong (England) Iris Cooley	15–6, 15–6	(gold) Winner
1953	Denmark Open	(Denmark) Agnete Friis	(Malaysia) David Choong (Denmark) Inger Kjærgaard	18–17, 15–5	(gold) Winner
1953	French Open	(England) Jenifer Peters	(England) Peter Birtwistle (England) Betty Grace	15–8, 15–5	(gold) Winner
1955	German Open	(Denmark) Hanne Jensen	(Malaysia) David Choong (Denmark) Annelise Hansen	3–15, 9–15	(silver) Runner-up
1957	Dutch Open	(Denmark) Hanne Jensen	(England) Hugh Findlay (England) Barbara Carpenter	12–15, 15–7, 15–1	(gold) Winner
1957	German Open	(England) Barbara Carpenter	(Denmark) Erland Kops (Denmark) Agnete Friis	6–15, 10–15	(silver) Runner-up
1957	Malaysia Open	(Malaysia) Lim Kit Lin	(Malaysia) Lim Say Hup (Malaysia) Tan Gaik Bee	3–15, 15–6, 12–15	(silver) Runner-up
1963	Malaysia Open	(Malaysia) Tan Gaik Bee	(Malaysia) Bobby Chee (Malaysia) Ewe Choon Ghee	4–15, 15–4, 15–6	(gold) Winner
1965	Malaysia Open	(Malaysia) Rosalind Singha Ang	(Malaysia) Teh Kew San (Malaysia) Ng Mei Ling	10–15, 7–15	(silver) Runner-up
1966	Penang Open	(Malaysia) Rosalind Singha Ang	(Indonesia) Abdul Patah Unang (Indonesia) Minarni	13–15, 9–15	(silver) Runner-up
1966	Malaysia Open	(Malaysia) Rosalind Singha Ang	(Indonesia) Abdul Patah Unang (Indonesia) Retno Koestijah	8–9, retired	(silver) Runner-up
1966	Perak Open	(Indonesia) Minarni	(Malaysia) Tan Yee Khan (Indonesia) Retno Koestijah	9–15, 11–15	(silver) Runner-up
1966	Singapore Open	(Malaysia) Lim Choo Eng	(Malaysia) Billy Ng (Malaysia) Sylvia Ng	15–17 retired	(silver) Runner-up

== Summary ==
Rank	Event	Date	Tournament
Open Championships
1	Men's singles Men's doubles	1953, 1954, 1956, 1957; 1951, 1952, 1953	All England
1	Men's singles Men's doubles Mixed doubles	1953; 1953; 1953	Denmark Open
1	Men's singles Men's doubles Mixed doubles	1954, 1955, 1957; 1955, 1957; 1957	Dutch Open
1	Men's singles Men's doubles Mixed doubles	1952, 1953; 1952, 1953; 1951, 1952, 1953	French Open
1	Men's singles Men's doubles	1955, 1956; 1955	German Open
1	Men's singles Men's doubles Mixed doubles	1951, 1952, 1953, 1957; 1952, 1953, 1957; 1951, 1953	Irish International
1	Men's singles Men's doubles Mixed doubles	1957, 1960; 1966; 1949, 1963	Malaysia Open
1	Men's singles Men's doubles	1954; 1954	Norwegian International
1	Men's singles Men's doubles	1951, 1953, 1957; 1951, 1952, 1953, 1957	Scottish Open
1	Men's doubles	1966	Singapore Open
1	Men's singles	1956	Swiss Open
1	Men's singles	1954	US Open
1	Men's singles Men's doubles	1950, 1951, 1952, 1953, 1954, 1956; 1950, 1954	Wimbledon International
2	Men's singles Men's doubles	1952, 1955; 1954, 1955, 1957	All England

== Sources ==
- Eddy Choong - MSN Encarta( 2009-10-31)
- Eddy Choong, Fred Brundle: Badminton. Foyles Handbooks, London, Foyle, 1955
- Eddy Choong, Fred Brundle: The Phoenix Book of Badminton – Its history, the development of the shuttlecock, the diversity of style and tactics, and the badminton world of today, London, Phoenix Sports Books, 1956
