= 1953 All England Badminton Championships =

1953 All England Championships
Tournament details
- Dates: 19 March 1953– 22 March 1953
- Edition: 43rd
- Venue: Empress Hall, Earls Court
- Location: London

The 1953 All England Championships was a badminton tournament held at the Empress Hall, Earls Court, London, England, from 19 to 22 March 1953.

== Final results ==
Category	Winners	Runners-up	Score
Men's singles	(Malaysia) Eddy Choong	(Malaysia) Johnny Heah	15–4, 15–4
Women's singles	(Denmark) Marie Ussing	(Denmark) Agnete Friis	11–2, 7–11, 11–2
Men's doubles	(Malaysia) Eddy Choong & David Ewe Choong	(Denmark) Poul Holm & Ole Jensen	15–5, 15–12
Women's doubles	(England) Iris Cooley & June White	(Denmark) Marie Ussing & Agnete Friis	11-15, 15–2, 15–9
Mixed doubles	(Malaysia) David Ewe Choong & (England) June White	(Denmark) Poul Holm & Agnete Friis	15–6, 15–10

== Results ==
=== Men's singles ===
Round of 16
(Malaysia) Eddy Choong	15	15
(England) R Mulvaney	4	1
(Denmark) Poul Holm	15	15
(England) John Best	9	8
(Sweden) Nils Jonson	15	15
(England) Ron Lockwood	0	3
(Denmark) Leif Jensen	15	10	15
(Scotland) Alastair Russell	8	15	9
(Malaysia) Johnny Heah +	15	15
(Malaysia) Douglas Lee	5	4
(Denmark) Ole Jensen	15	15
(England) M Robinson	5	3
(Canada) Donald Smythe	15	15
(India) S L Jaini	10	5
(Denmark) Jørgen Hammergaard Hansen

Quarterfinals
(Malaysia) Choong	15	15
(Denmark) Holm	11	7
(Sweden) Jonson	15	15
(Denmark) Jensen L	8	0
(Malaysia) Heah	10	15	15
(Denmark) Jensen O	15	3	7
(Canada) Smythe	15	15
(Denmark) Hammegaard-H	8	11

Semifinals
(Malaysia) Choong	15	15
(Sweden) Jonson	4	0
(Malaysia) Heah	17	2	15
(Canada) Smythe	14	15	13

Final
(Malaysia) Choong	15	15
(Malaysia) Heah	4	4

=== Women's singles ===
Round of 16
(Denmark) Marie Ussing
(England) J Peters
(England) Iris Cooley
(Denmark) Birgit Schultz-Pedersen
(Denmark) Agnete Friis
(England) Elizabeth O'Beirne
(Scotland) Nancy Horner
(England) D B Grace

Quarterfinals
(Denmark) Ussing	11	11
(England) Peters	2	1
(England) Cooley	11	11
(Denmark) Schultz-Pedersen	0	5
(Denmark) Friis	12	6	11
(England) O'Beirne	9	11	1
(Scotland) Horner	12	11
(England) Grace	9	2

Semifinals
(Denmark) Ussing	9	11	11
(England) Cooley	11	12	6
(Denmark) Friis	11	11
(Scotland) Horner	1	7

Final
(Denmark) Ussing	11	7	11
(Denmark) Friis	2	11	2
