= June Timperley =

English badminton player

Personal information
- Born: 1933
- Died: 22 March 2017 (aged 84) Sutton, London

Sport
- Country: England
- Sport: Badminton

June Rose Timperley (née White) was an English badminton player.

== Badminton career ==
Born June White she came to prominence in the early fifties when playing doubles. Partnering Iris Rogers née Cooley the pair broke the stranglehold of the Danish pairs during the era of Danish domination by claiming three All England women's doubles titles. She also claimed three All England mixed doubles titles with David Choong and then Tony Jordan.

== Personal life ==
She married John Timperley in 1955, a former badminton international. She died in 2017.

== Achievements ==
=== International tournaments (32 titles, 16 runners-up) ===
Women's singles
Year	Tournament	Opponent	Score	Result
1953	Irish Open	(England) Iris Cooley	8–11, 4–11	(silver) Runner-up
1955	Scottish Open	(England) Iris Cooley	8–11, 3–11	(silver) Runner-up
1957	Dutch Open	(England) Barbara Carpenter	11–1, 11–5	(gold) Winner
1958	Dutch Open	(England) Iris Rogers	4–11, 8–11	(silver) Runner-up

Women's doubles
Year	Tournament	Partner	Opponent	Score	Result
1953	Irish Open	(England) Iris Cooley	(England) Elisabeth O'Beirne (England) Audrey Stone	15–11, 15–11	(gold) Winner
1953	All England Open	(England) Iris Cooley	(Denmark) Agnete Friis (Denmark) Marie Ussing	11–15, 15–2, 15–9	(gold) Winner
1953	Denmark Open	(England) Iris Cooley	(Denmark) Aase Schiøtt Jacobsen (Denmark) Marie Ussing	17–16, 15–1	(gold) Winner
1954	Scottish Open	(England) Iris Cooley	(Scotland) Nancy Horner (Scotland) I. S. Vallance	15–10, 15–9	(gold) Winner
1954	Irish Open	(England) Iris Cooley	(Scotland) Nancy Horner (Scotland) J. C. Smart	15–7, 15–4	(gold) Winner
1954	All England Open	(England) Iris Cooley	(United States) Judy Devlin (United States) Susan Devlin	7–15, 15–12, 8–15	(silver) Runner-up
1955	Scottish Open	(England) Iris Cooley	(Scotland) E. Tyre (Scotland) Wilma Tyre	15–5, 15–2	(gold) Winner
1955	Irish Open	(England) Iris Cooley	(England) Elisabeth O'Beirne (England) Audrey Stone	15–11, 15–10	(gold) Winner
1955	All England Open	(England) Iris Cooley	(United States) Judy Devlin (United States) Susan Devlin	18–15, 10–15, 15–9	(gold) Winner
1956	Scottish Open	(England) Iris Rogers	(England) M. Crockett (England) Heather Ward	15–7, 15–3	(gold) Winner
1956	Dutch Open	(England) Barbara Carpenter	(Denmark) Agnete Friis (Denmark) Annelise Petersen	15–9, 15–4	(gold) Winner
1956	All England Open	(England) Iris Rogers	(United States) Judy Devlin (United States) Susan Devlin	18–17, 12–15, 12–15	(silver) Runner-up
1957	Dutch Open	(England) Barbara Carpenter	(Denmark) Anni Hammergaard Hansen (Denmark) Hanne Jensen	15–13, 9–15, 9–15	(silver) Runner-up
1957	Irish Open	(England) Iris Rogers	(England) Barbara Carpenter (England) Heather Ward	18–13, 11–15, 15–2	(gold) Winner
1957	Swedish Open	(England) Iris Rogers	(Denmark) Hanne Roest (England) Heather Ward	15–2, 15–7	(gold) Winner
1957	All England Open	(England) Iris Rogers	(Denmark) Kirsten Granlund (Denmark) Anni Hammergaard Hansen	15–7, 11–15, 10–15	(silver) Runner-up
1957	Welsh International	(England) Patricia Dolan	(England) Audrey Marshall (England) Sheila Ryder	18–15, 15–6	(gold) Winner
1958	Scottish Open	(England) Iris Rogers	(England) Barbara Carpenter (England) Heather Ward	15–13, 15–7	(gold) Winner
1958	Dutch Open	(England) Iris Rogers	(Denmark) Agnete Friis (Denmark) Inger Kjærgaard	15–5, 15–5	(gold) Winner
1958	All England Open	(England) Iris Rogers	(United States) Margaret Varner Bloss (England) Heather Ward	12–15, 2–15	(silver) Runner-up
1959	Irish Open	(England) Iris Rogers	(England) Barbara Carpenter (England) Heather Ward	15–6, 15–7	(gold) Winner
1959	All England Open	(England) Iris Rogers	(United States) Judy Devlin (United States) Susan Devlin	11–15, 15–10, 15–11	(gold) Winner
1963	Swedish Open	(England) Ursula Smith	(Denmark) Karin Jørgensen (Denmark) Ulla Rasmussen	2–15, 14–18	(silver) Runner-up

Mixed doubles
Year	Tournament	Partner	Opponent	Score	Result
1953	Irish Open	(Malaysia) Eddy Choong	(Malaysia) David Choong (England) Iris Cooley	15–6, 15–6	(gold) Winner
1953	All England Open	(Malaysia) David Choong	(Denmark) Poul Holm (Denmark) Agnete Friis	15–6, 15–10	(gold) Winner
1954	Scottish Open	(England) Tony Jordan	(England) John Best (England) Iris Cooley	14–18, 15–2, 15–9	(gold) Winner
1955	Scottish Open	(England) Tony Jordan	(England) John Best (England) Iris Cooley	7–15, 15–3, 10–15	(silver) Runner-up
1955	Irish Open	(England) Tony Jordan	(England) John D. McColl (England) Audrey Stone	15–3, 15–10	(gold) Winner
1955	All England Open	(Malaysia) David Choong	(Denmark) Finn Kobberø (Denmark) Kirsten Thorndahl	7–15, 13–15	(silver) Runner-up
1956	Scottish Open	(England) Tony Jordan	(England) John Best (England) Iris Rogers	12–15, 15–10, 15–8	(gold) Winner
1956	Dutch Open	(England) John Timperley	(Denmark) Hans Jensen (Denmark) Annelise Petersen	17–18, 15–1, 15–8	(gold) Winner
1956	All England Open	(England) Tony Jordan	(Denmark) Jørgen Hammergaard Hansen (Denmark) Anni Jorgensen	18–15, 6–15, 15–8	(gold) Winner
1957	Irish Open	(England) Tony Jordan	(England) John Best (England) Iris Rogers	11–15, 18–17, 15–6	(gold) Winner
1957	Swedish Open	(England) Tony Jordan	(England) John Best (England) Iris Rogers	17–14, 15–3	(gold) Winner
1957	Welsh International	(Malaysia) Oon Chong Jin	(England) Kenneth Derrick (England) S. Lindsay	13–15, 15–3, 18–13	(gold) Winner
1958	Scottish Open	(England) Tony Jordan	(England) John Best (England) Iris Rogers	9–15, 8–15	(silver) Runner-up
1958	Dutch Open	(England) John Timperley	(England) Hugh Findlay (England) Iris Rogers	12–15, 12–15	(silver) Runner-up
1958	All England Open	(England) Tony Jordan	(Denmark) Finn Kobberø (Denmark) Aase Winther	15–9, 7–15, 15–5	(gold) Winner
1959	Irish Open	(England) Tony Jordan	(England) Ronald Lockwood (England) Iris Rogers	15–10, 15–7	(gold) Winner
1960	Scottish Open	(England) Tony Jordan	(England) Ronald Lockwood (England) Audrey Marshall	15–5, 15–12	(gold) Winner
1961	Irish Open	(England) Tony Jordan	(England) Trevor Coates (England) Ursula Smith	15–10, 15–2	(gold) Winner
1961	All England Open	(England) Tony Jordan	(Denmark) Finn Kobberø (Denmark) Kirsten Thorndahl	12–15, 5–15	(silver) Runner-up
1963	Swedish Open	(England) Tony Jordan	(Denmark) Poul-Erik Nielsen (Denmark) Ulla Rasmussen	15–9, 3–15, 4–15	(silver) Runner-up
1963	All England Open	(England) Tony Jordan	(Denmark) Finn Kobberø (Denmark) Ulla Rasmussen	8–15, 12–15	(silver) Runner-up
