= German Open (badminton) =

Badminton championships

- Official website
- Founded: 1955; 71 years ago
- Editions: 67 (2026)
- Location: Mülheim (2026); Germany
- Venue: Westenergie Sporthalle (2026)
- Prize money: USD250,000 (2026)

Men's
- Draw: 32S / 32D
- Current champions: Christo Popov (singles); Chen Boyang; Liu Yi (doubles)
- Most singles titles: 6 Erland Kops; Lin Dan
- Most doubles titles: 5 Jon Holst-Christensen; Thomas Lund

Women's
- Draw: 32S / 32D
- Current champions: Han Qianxi (singles); Bao Lijing; Luo Xumin (doubles)
- Most singles titles: 6 Eva Twedberg
- Most doubles titles: 4 Gillian Gilks

Mixed doubles
- Draw: 32
- Current champions: Cheng Xing; Zhang Chi
- Most titles (male): 4 Thomas Lund
- Most titles (female): 5 Gillian Gilks

Super 300
- Canada Open; German Open; Korea Masters; Macau Open; New Zealand Open; Orléans Masters; Spain Masters; Swiss Open; Syed Modi International; Taipei Open; Thailand Masters; U.S. Open

Last completed
- 2026 German Open

The German Open is an annual badminton tournament held in Germany since 1955 (as West Germany) and organized by German Badminton Association or Deutscher Badminton Verband (DBV). The tournaments were not held in the year 1970, 1979 and 1998.

Known as German Badminton Championships until 1980, the tournament was later allowed to be known as Open Championships from 1981 on. The tournament is currently sponsored by Yonex. While it does attract professional players, the event is not part of the highest levels of Badminton World Federation tournaments – being classified as a BWF Grand Prix Gold event until 2017, and a Super 300 tournament (6th level) from 2018 on.

== Host cities ==
- 1955–1962: Bonn
- 1963, 1969: Hamburg
- 1964: Lübeck
- 1965: Bochum
- 1966: Hanover
- 1967: Frankfurt
- 1968: West Berlin
- 1970, 1979, 1998: not held
- 1971–1974, 1978: Oberhausen
- 1975–1977, 1980–1982, 2005–present: Mülheim an der Ruhr
- 1983–1986, 1999–2004: Duisburg
- 1987–1991: Düsseldorf
- 1992–1995: Leverkusen
- 1996–1997: Saarbrücken
Locations of German Open host cities

== Past winners ==
Year	Men's singles	Women's singles	Men's doubles	Women's doubles	Mixed doubles	Ref
1955	(Malaysia) Eddy Choong	(Denmark) Hanne Jensen	(Malaysia) Eddy Choong (Malaysia) David Choong	(Denmark) Annelise Hansen (Denmark) Grete Flensted	(Malaysia) David Choong (Denmark) Annelise Hansen	
1956	(Malaysia) Eddy Choong	(Denmark) Inger Kjærgaard	(Denmark) Jørn Skaarup (Denmark) Jørgen Hammergaard Hansen	(Denmark) Anni Jørgensen (Denmark) Hanne Jensen	(Denmark) Jørgen Hammergaard Hansen (Denmark) Anni Jørgensen	
1957	(Malaysia) Eddy Choong	(Denmark) Inger Kjærgaard	(Malaysia) Eddy Choong (Malaysia) David Choong	(Denmark) Agnete Friis (Denmark) Hanne Jensen	(Denmark) Erland Kops (Denmark) Agnete Friis	
1958	(Indonesia) Ferry Sonneville	(Germany) Gisela Ellermann	(England) Hugh Findlay (England) John Timperley	(Germany) Gisela Ellermann (Germany) Hannelore Schmidt	(Sweden) Bo Nilsson (Sweden) Amy Pettersson	
1959	(Sweden) Bertil Glans	(Denmark) Aase Schiøtt Jacobsen	(Denmark) Jesper Sandvad (Denmark) Poul-Erik Nielsen	(Denmark) Agnete Friis (Denmark) Aase Schiøtt Jacobsen	(Denmark) Poul-Erik Nielsen (Denmark) Agnete Friis	
1960	(Indonesia) Ferry Sonneville	(Sweden) Eva Pettersson	(Sweden) Bertil Glans (Sweden) Berndt Dahlberg	(Denmark) Agnete Friis (Denmark) Inger Kjærgaard	(Denmark) Bjørn Holst-Christensen (Denmark) Inger Kjærgaard	
1961	(Indonesia) Ferry Sonneville	(United States) Judy Hashman	(England) Hugh Findlay (England) Tony Jordan	(United States) Judy Hashman (United States) Sonia Cox	(Malaysia) Yeoh Kean Hua (United States) Judy Hashman	
1962	(Denmark) Erland Kops	(United States) Judy Hashman	(Denmark) Finn Kobberø (Denmark) Jørgen Hammergaard Hansen	(United States) Judy Hashman (United States) Tonny Holst-Christensen	(Denmark) Finn Kobberø (Denmark) Hanne Andersen	
1963	(Denmark) Erland Kops	(United States) Judy Hashman	(Denmark) Erland Kops (Denmark) Poul-Erik Nielsen	(Denmark) Karin Jørgensen (Denmark) Ulla Rasmussen	(Denmark) Poul-Erik Nielsen (Denmark) Kirsten Thorndahl	
1964	(Denmark) Erland Kops	(United States) Judy Hashman	(Denmark) Erland Kops (Denmark) Poul-Erik Nielsen	(England) Angela Bairstow (England) Jenny Pritchard	(Denmark) Finn Kobberø (Denmark) Bente Flindt	
1965	(South Africa) Alan Parsons	(England) Ursula Smith	(South Africa) Alan Parsons (South Africa) William Kerr	(England) Brenda Parr (England) Ursula Smith	(New Zealand) Richard Purser (New Zealand) Gerda Schumacher	
1966	(Denmark) Erland Kops	(Germany) Irmgard Latz	(Denmark) Per Walsøe (Denmark) Poul-Erik Nielsen	(United States) Judy Hashman (United States) Sue Peard	(Denmark) Morten Pommergaard (Denmark) Ulla Strand	
1967	(Denmark) Erland Kops	(Sweden) Eva Twedberg	(Germany) Wolfgang Bochow (Germany) Friedhelm Wulff	(Germany) Irmgard Latz (Germany) Marieluise Wackerow	(Denmark) Per Walsøe (Denmark) Ulla Strand	
1968	(Denmark) Erland Kops	(Sweden) Eva Twedberg	(Malaysia) Tan Yee Khan (Malaysia) Ng Boon Bee	(England) Margaret Boxall (England) Susan Pound	(England) Tony Jordan (England) Susan Whetnall	
1969	(Denmark) Svend Pri	(Denmark) Anne Flindt	(Denmark) Jørgen Mortensen (Denmark) Henning Borch	(Denmark) Anne Flindt (Denmark) Pernille Mølgaard Hansen	(England) Tony Jordan (England) Susan Whetnall	
1970	not held					
1971	(Sweden) Sture Johnsson	(Sweden) Eva Twedberg	(Malaysia) Punch Gunalan (Malaysia) Ng Boon Bee	(Denmark) Anne Flindt (Denmark) Pernille Mølgaard Hansen	(England) Derek Talbot (England) Gillian Gilks	
1972	(Sweden) Sture Johnsson	(Sweden) Eva Twedberg	(Malaysia) Punch Gunalan (Malaysia) Ng Boon Bee	(Denmark) Anne Flindt (Denmark) Pernille Mølgaard Hansen	(Germany) Wolfgang Bochow (Germany) Marieluise Zizmann	
1973	(Sweden) Sture Johnsson	(Sweden) Eva Twedberg	(Indonesia) Tjun Tjun (Indonesia) Johan Wahjudi	(South Africa) Deirdre Tyghe (South Africa) Barbara Lord	(Sweden) Gert Perneklo (Sweden) Eva Twedberg	
1974	(Sweden) Sture Johnsson	(England) Margaret Beck	(England) Derek Talbot (England) Elliot Stuart	(England) Margaret Beck (England) Gillian Gilks	(Germany) Roland Maywald (Germany) Brigitte Steden	
1975	(Denmark) Flemming Delfs	(Netherlands) Joke van Beusekom	(Sweden) Bengt Fröman (Sweden) Thomas Kihlström	(Germany) Brigitte Steden (Germany) Marieluise Zizmann	(Germany) Wolfgang Bochow (Germany) Marieluise Zizmann	
1976	(England) Paul Whetnall	(England) Gillian Gilks	(Sweden) Bengt Fröman (Sweden) Thomas Kihlström	(England) Gillian Gilks (England) Susan Whetnall	(England) Mike Tredgett (England) Nora Perry	
1977	(Sweden) Sture Johnsson	(England) Margaret Beck	(Sweden) Bengt Fröman (Sweden) Thomas Kihlström	(England) Barbara Sutton (England) Jane Webster	(England) David Eddy (England) Barbara Sutton	
1978	(England) Ray Stevens	(England) Jane Webster	(Sweden) Ola Eriksson (Sweden) Christian Lundberg	(England) Nora Perry (England) Anne Statt	(Netherlands) Rob Ridder (Netherlands) Marjan Ridder	
1979	not held					
1980	(Sweden) Thomas Angarth	(Denmark) Pia Nielsen	(Denmark) Jens Peter Nierhoff (Denmark) Steen Skovgaard	(England) Jane Webster (England) Karen Chapman	(Denmark) Steen Skovgaard (Denmark) Anne Skovgaard	
1981	(Malaysia) Misbun Sidek	(Japan) Hiroe Yuki	(England) Duncan Bridge (England) Martin Dew	(England) Gillian Gilks (England) Paula Kilvington	(Denmark) Steen Fladberg (Denmark) Pia Nielsen	
1982	(Denmark) Morten Frost	(China) Wu Dixi	(Denmark) Morten Frost (Denmark) Steen Fladberg	(China) Wu Dixi (China) Lin Ying	(England) Dipak Tailor (England) Gillian Gilks	
1983	(Malaysia) Misbun Sidek	(Denmark) Nettie Nielsen	(England) Mike Tredgett (England) Martin Dew	(Japan) Sumiko Kitada (Japan) Shigemi Kawamura	(Denmark) Steen Fladberg (Denmark) Pia Nielsen	
1984	(Denmark) Michael Kjeldsen	(England) Karen Beckman	(England) Mike Tredgett (England) Martin Dew	(England) Gillian Gilks (England) Karen Beckman	(England) Martin Dew (England) Gillian Gilks	
1985	(England) Nick Yates	(China) Qian Ping	(China) Li Yongbo (China) Ding Qiqing	(China) Wu Jianqiu (China) Guan Weizhen	(England) Martin Dew (England) Gillian Gilks	
1986	(Denmark) Morten Frost	(South Korea) Kim Yun-ja	(South Korea) Park Joo-bong (South Korea) Kim Moon-soo	(South Korea) Kim Yun-ja (South Korea) Yoo Sang-hee	(South Korea) Lee Deuk-choon (South Korea) Chung Myung-hee	
1987	(England) Darren Hall	(China) Qian Ping	(Thailand) Sawei Chanseorasmee (Thailand) Sakrapee Thongsari	(China) Lin Ying (China) Guan Weizhen	(England) Martin Dew (England) Gillian Gilks	
1988	(Denmark) Morten Frost	(China) Han Aiping	(Denmark) Jan Paulsen (Denmark) Steen Fladberg	(China) Lao Yujing (China) Zheng Yuli	(Denmark) Steen Fladberg (England) Gillian Clark	
1989	(Denmark) Morten Frost	(England) Helen Troke	(Denmark) Jan Paulsen (Denmark) Henrik Svarrer	(Indonesia) Erma Sulistianingsih (Indonesia) Rosiana Tendean	(Denmark) Jan Paulsen (England) Gillian Gowers	
1990	(Indonesia) Fung Permadi	(Denmark) Pernille Nedergaard	(Malaysia) Ong Ewe Chye (Malaysia) Rahman Sidek	(Denmark) Dorte Kjær (Denmark) Lotte Olsen	(Sweden) Pär-Gunnar Jönsson (Sweden) Maria Bengtsson	
1991	(Denmark) Poul-Erik Høyer Larsen	(China) Huang Hua	(Indonesia) Eddy Hartono (Indonesia) Rudy Gunawan	(Sweden) Christine Magnusson (Sweden) Lim Xiaoqing	(Denmark) Thomas Lund (Denmark) Pernille Dupont	
1992	(Indonesia) Alan Budikusuma	(Indonesia) Susi Susanti	(Denmark) Jon Holst-Christensen (Denmark) Thomas Lund	(Sweden) Christine Magnusson (Sweden) Lim Xiaoqing	(Denmark) Thomas Lund (Denmark) Pernille Dupont	
1993	(Denmark) Thomas Stuer-Lauridsen	(Indonesia) Susi Susanti	(Denmark) Jon Holst-Christensen (Denmark) Thomas Lund	(Indonesia) Finarsih (Indonesia) Lili Tampi	(Denmark) Thomas Lund (Netherlands) Erica van den Heuvel	
1994	(Denmark) Poul-Erik Høyer Larsen	(Sweden) Lim Xiaoqing	(Denmark) Jon Holst-Christensen (Denmark) Thomas Lund	(China) Peng Xingyong (China) Zhang Jin	(Denmark) Thomas Lund (Denmark) Marlene Thomsen	
1995	(Indonesia) Joko Suprianto	(Denmark) Camilla Martin	(Denmark) Jon Holst-Christensen (Denmark) Thomas Lund	(Indonesia) Eliza Nathanael (Indonesia) Zelin Resiana	(Netherlands) Ron Michels (Netherlands) Erica van den Heuvel	
1996	(Malaysia) Rashid Sidek	(China) Yao Jie	(Denmark) Jon Holst-Christensen (Denmark) Thomas Lund	(Indonesia) Deyana Lomban (Indonesia) Indarti Issolina	(Indonesia) Tri Kusharyanto (Indonesia) Minarti Timur	
1997	(Denmark) Peter Gade	(Denmark) Camilla Martin	(Denmark) Jesper Larsen (Denmark) Jens Eriksen	(Denmark) Rikke Olsen (Denmark) Helene Kirkegaard	(Denmark) Jens Eriksen (Denmark) Marlene Thomsen	
1998	not held					
1999	(China) Xia Xuanze	(China) Tang Chunyu	(Malaysia) Choong Tan Fook (Malaysia) Lee Wan Wah	(China) Chen Lin (China) Jiang Xuelian	(Denmark) Lars Paaske (Denmark) Jane F. Bramsen	
2000	(Ukraine) Vladislav Druzchenko	(China) Dong Fang	(Denmark) Michael Søgaard (Denmark) Jim Laugesen	(China) Lu Ying (China) Huang Sui	(Denmark) Jonas Rasmussen (Denmark) Jane F. Bramsen	
2001	(Denmark) Kenneth Jonassen	(France) Pi Hongyan	(Denmark) Michael Søgaard (Denmark) Jim Laugesen	(Denmark) Rikke Olsen (Denmark) Helene Kirkegaard	(Denmark) Michael Søgaard (Denmark) Rikke Olsen	
2002	(Denmark) Niels Christian Kaldau	(France) Pi Hongyan	(Denmark) Jonas Rasmussen (Denmark) Lars Paaske	(Netherlands) Mia Audina (Netherlands) Lotte Jonathans	(Denmark) Michael Søgaard (Denmark) Rikke Olsen	
2003	(South Korea) Lee Hyun-il	(China) Zhang Ning	(Indonesia) Flandy Limpele (Indonesia) Eng Hian	(South Korea) Ra Kyung-min (South Korea) Lee Kyung-won	(South Korea) Kim Dong-moon (South Korea) Ra Kyung-min	
2004	(China) Lin Dan	(China) Xie Xingfang	(Denmark) Mathias Boe (Denmark) Carsten Mogensen	(China) Zhang Dan (China) Zhang Yawen	(Denmark) Carsten Mogensen (Denmark) Rikke Olsen	
2005	(China) Lin Dan	(China) Xie Xingfang	(China) Fu Haifeng (China) Cai Yun	(China) Gao Ling (China) Huang Sui	(South Korea) Lee Jae-jin (South Korea) Lee Hyo-jung	
2006	(China) Chen Jin	(China) Zhang Ning	(South Korea) Jung Jae-sung (South Korea) Lee Yong-dae	(China) Yang Wei (China) Zhang Jiewen	(China) Zhang Jun (China) Gao Ling	
2007	(China) Lin Dan	(China) Xie Xingfang	(South Korea) Lee Jae-jin (South Korea) Hwang Ji-man	(China) Yang Wei (China) Zhang Jiewen	(China) Zheng Bo (China) Gao Ling	
2008	(South Korea) Lee Hyun-il	(South Korea) Jun Jae-youn	(South Korea) Lee Jae-jin (South Korea) Hwang Ji-man	(South Korea) Lee Kyung-won (South Korea) Lee Hyo-jung	(South Korea) Lee Yong-dae (South Korea) Lee Hyo-jung	
2009	(China) Bao Chunlai	(China) Wang Yihan	(South Korea) Lee Yong-dae (South Korea) Shin Baek-cheol	(China) Cheng Shu (China) Zhao Yunlei	(China) Xu Chen (China) Zhao Yunlei	
2010	(China) Bao Chunlai	(China) Wang Xin	(China) Chai Biao (China) Zhang Nan	(China) Ma Jin (China) Wang Xiaoli	(Hong Kong) Yohan Hadikusumo Wiratama (Hong Kong) Tse Ying Suet	
2011	(China) Lin Dan	(China) Liu Xin	(South Korea) Lee Yong-dae (South Korea) Jung Jae-sung	(Japan) Mizuki Fujii (Japan) Reika Kakiiwa	(Scotland) Robert Blair (England) Gabrielle White	
2012	(China) Lin Dan	(China) Li Xuerui	(China) Hong Wei (China) Shen Ye	(China) Xia Huan (China) Tang Jinhua	(Denmark) Thomas Laybourn (Denmark) Kamilla Rytter Juhl	
2013	(China) Chen Long	(China) Wang Yihan	(China) Chai Biao (China) Hong Wei	(South Korea) Jung Kyung-eun (South Korea) Kim Ha-na	(South Korea) Shin Baek-cheol (South Korea) Jang Ye-na	
2014	(India) Arvind Bhat	(Japan) Sayaka Takahashi	(Japan) Takeshi Kamura (Japan) Keigo Sonoda	(Japan) Misaki Matsutomo (Japan) Ayaka Takahashi	(Scotland) Robert Blair (Scotland) Imogen Bankier	
2015	(Denmark) Jan Ø. Jørgensen	(South Korea) Sung Ji-hyun	(Denmark) Mads Conrad-Petersen (Denmark) Mads Pieler Kolding	(Denmark) Christinna Pedersen (Denmark) Kamilla Rytter Juhl	(Denmark) Mads Pieler Kolding (Denmark) Kamilla Rytter Juhl	
2016	(China) Lin Dan	(China) Li Xuerui	(South Korea) Ko Sung-hyun (South Korea) Shin Baek-cheol	(China) Huang Yaqiong (China) Tang Jinhua	(South Korea) Ko Sung-hyun (South Korea) Kim Ha-na	
2017	(Chinese Taipei) Chou Tien-chen	(Japan) Akane Yamaguchi	(Denmark) Kim Astrup (Denmark) Anders Skaarup Rasmussen	(Japan) Yuki Fukushima (Japan) Sayaka Hirota	(China) Zhang Nan (China) Li Yinhui	
2018	(Chinese Taipei) Chou Tien-chen	(Japan) Akane Yamaguchi	(Japan) Takuto Inoue (Japan) Yuki Kaneko	(Japan) Yuki Fukushima (Japan) Sayaka Hirota	(Malaysia) Goh Soon Huat (Malaysia) Shevon Jemie Lai	
2019	(Japan) Kento Momota	(Japan) Akane Yamaguchi	(Japan) Hiroyuki Endo (Japan) Yuta Watanabe	(China) Du Yue (China) Li Yinhui	(South Korea) Seo Seung-jae (South Korea) Chae Yoo-jung	
2020	Cancelled (Note: This tournament, originally to be played from 3 to 8 March, was later cancelled due to COVID-19 pandemic in Germany.)					
2021	Cancelled (Note: This tournament, originally to be played from 9 to 14 March, was later cancelled due to the COVID-19 pandemic in Germany.)					
2022	(Thailand) Kunlavut Vitidsarn	(China) He Bingjiao	(Malaysia) Goh Sze Fei (Malaysia) Nur Izzuddin	(China) Chen Qingchen (China) Jia Yifan	(Thailand) Dechapol Puavaranukroh (Thailand) Sapsiree Taerattanachai	
2023	(Hong Kong) Ng Ka Long	(Japan) Akane Yamaguchi	(South Korea) Choi Sol-gyu (South Korea) Kim Won-ho	(South Korea) Baek Ha-na (South Korea) Lee So-hee	(China) Feng Yanzhe (China) Huang Dongping	
2024	(France) Christo Popov	(Denmark) Mia Blichfeldt	(Chinese Taipei) Lee Jhe-huei (Chinese Taipei) Yang Po-hsuan	(China) Li Yijing (China) Luo Xumin	(Hong Kong) Tang Chun Man (Hong Kong) Tse Ying Suet	
2025	(Denmark) Viktor Axelsen	(Singapore) Yeo Jia Min	(South Korea) Kim Won-ho (South Korea) Seo Seung-jae	(Japan) Mizuki Otake (Japan) Miyu Takahashi	(Netherlands) Robin Tabeling (Denmark) Alexandra Bøje	
2026	(France) Christo Popov	(China) Han Qianxi	(China) Chen Boyang (China) Liu Yi	(China) Bao Lijing (China) Luo Xumin	(China) Cheng Xing (China) Zhang Chi	

== Performances by nation ==
As of 2026 edition

No	Nation	MS	WS	MD	WD	XD	Total
1	Denmark	21	11	23	13	25.5	93.5
2	China	11	21	6	19	6	63
3	England	4	7	6	10	10.5	37.5
4	South Korea	2	3	9	5	7	26
5	Sweden	7	7	5	2	3	24
6	Indonesia	6	2	3	4	1	16
6	Japan	1	6	3	6		16
6	Malaysia	6		8		2	16
9	Germany		2	1	3	3	9
10	United States		4		3	0.5	7.5
11	Netherlands		1		1	3	5
12	France	2	2				4
13	Chinese Taipei	2		1			3
13	Hong Kong	1				2	3
13	South Africa	1		1	1		3
13	Thailand	1		1		1	3
17	Scotland					1.5	1.5
18	India	1					1
18	New Zealand					1	1
18	Singapore		1				1
18	Ukraine	1					1
Total		67	67	67	67	67	335

=== Full list ===
- List of German Open Women's singles champions
