= 1947 All England Badminton Championships =

1947 All England Championships
Tournament details
- Dates: 5 March 1947– 9 March 1947
- Edition: 37th
- Venue: Harringay Arena
- Location: London
- Official website: All England Championships

The 1947 All England Championships was a badminton tournament held at the Harringay Arena, London, England, from 5–9 March 1947. Snow made its way into the arena during the first round and made the courts unplayable.

== Final results ==
Category	Winners	Runners-up	Score
Men's singles	(Sweden) Conny Jepsen	(British Raj) Prakash Nath	15–7, 15–11
Women's singles	(Denmark) Marie Ussing	(Denmark) Kirsten Thorndahl	11–6, 6-11, 12–10
Men's doubles	(Denmark) Poul Holm & Tage Madsen	(Denmark) Jørn Skaarup & Preben Dabelsteen	4-15 15-12 15-4
Women's doubles	(Denmark) Tonny Olsen & Kirsten Thorndahl	(Denmark) Marie Ussing & Aase Schiøtt Jacobsen	15–8, 15–7
Mixed doubles	(Denmark) Poul Holm & Tonny Olsen	(Denmark) Tage Madsen & Kirsten Thorndahl	15-13 13-15 15-12

== Men's singles ==
Second round
(Sweden) Conny Jepsen	18	15
(Denmark) Preben Dabelsteen	15	7
(Denmark) Poul Holm	15	15
(England) G N Roberts	2	9
(England) Ralph Nichols	18	15
(Scotland) James Mackay	17	9
(Denmark) Jørn Skaarup	15	15	15
(Republic of Ireland) D F Green	3	4
(British Raj) Prakash Nath	15	15
(Republic of Ireland) Tod Majury	7	11
(British Raj) Davinder Mohan	15	15
(England) Tom Wingfield	12	5
(Sweden) Helge Paulsson	15	15
(Denmark) Erik Friis	2	0
(England) Noel Radford	15	15
(England) Barron Renton	4	4

Quarterfinals
(Sweden) Jepsen	15	15
(Denmark) Holm	6	1
(England) Nichols	6	1
(Denmark) Skaarup	15	15
(British Raj) Nath	w/o
(British Raj) Mohan
(Sweden) Paulsson	15	1	11
(England) Radford	5	15	15

Semifinals
(Sweden) Jepsen	8	15	18
(Denmark) Skaarup	15	5	14
(British Raj) Nath	18	15
(England) Radford	15	2

Final
(Sweden) Jepsen	15	15
(British Raj) Nath	7	11

== Women's singles ==
First round
(Denmark) Marie Ussing	w/o
(England) Evelyn Windsor-Aubrey
(England) Betty Uber	w/o
(England) C. D. Newitt
(Denmark) Aase Schiøtt Jacobsen	11	11
(England) V. E. Duringer	2	4
(England) Audrey Blathwayt	11	6	11
(England) M. Lister	3	11	4
(Denmark) Kirsten Thorndahl	11	11
(England) Queenie Allen	3	4
(Scotland) Nancy Horner	11	11
(England) Audrey Stone	1	1
(Denmark) Tonny Olsen	w/o
(England) A. Y. Richardson
(Denmark) Birgit Rostgaard-Frøhne	11	11
(England) R. Wilson Lee	3	3

Quarterfinals
(Denmark) Ussing	12
(England) Uber	11	ret
(Denmark) Schiøtt Jacobsen	11	11
(England) Blathwayt	2	5
(Denmark) Thorndahl	11	11
(Scotland) Horner	2	4
(Denmark) Olsen	11	11
(Denmark) Rostgaard-Frøhne	3	4

Semifinals
(Denmark) Ussing	11	11
(Denmark) Olsen	7	5
(Denmark) Thorndahl	2	11	11
(Denmark) Schiøtt Jacobsen	11	8	7

Final
(Denmark) Ussing	11	6	12
(Denmark) Thorndahl	6	11	10
