= David E. L. Choong =

Malaysian badminton player and politician

David E. L. Choong 庄友良 DSPN AMN
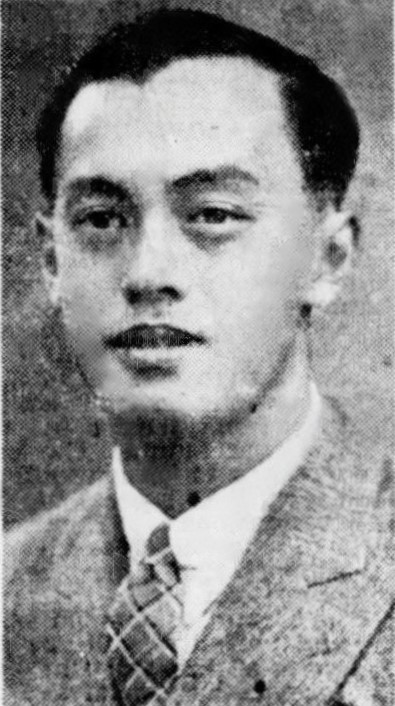
- David E. L. Choong in 1950

Personal information
- Born: Choong Ewe Leong; 5 April 1929 Penang, British Malaya
- Died: 10 September 2011 (aged 82) Tanjung Tokong, Penang, Malaysia

Sport
- Country: Malaysia
- Sport: Badminton
- Handedness: Right
- Event: Men's singles, Men's and Mixed doubles

David E. L. Choong

Chinese name
- Traditional Chinese: 莊友良
- Simplified Chinese: 庄友良
- Hanyu Pinyin: Zhuāng Youliáng
- Jyutping: Zong1 Jau5 Loeng4
- Hokkien POJ: Chng Iú-liông
- Tâi-lô: Tsng Iú-liông

Choong Ewe Leong (simplified Chinese: 庄友良; traditional Chinese: 莊友良; pinyin: Zhuāng Youliáng; Jyutping: Zong1 Jau5 Loeng4; Pe̍h-ōe-jī: Chng Iú-liông; 5 April 1929 – 10 September 2011) was a former Malaysian badminton player and politician.

== Career ==
With his younger brother, the charismatic Eddy Choong, he captured men's doubles titles at the prestigious All-England Championships in 1951, 1952, and 1953. They were finalists in 1954, 1955, and 1957. He shared the All-England mixed doubles crown with June White (Timperly) in 1953 and they were finalists in 1955. Between 1949 and 1957 Choong won national open titles in most of the European nations that held such tournaments. In part, because he resided in Great Britain during most of his badminton prime, David Choong never represented Malaya in the coveted Thomas Cup (world team) competition. He was inducted into the International Badminton Hall of Fame in 1998.

== Politics ==
Choong was a Penang State Legislative Assemblyman for Air Itam from 1974 to 1978. He also contested in the 1964 for the Tanjong parliamentary seat as an Alliance coalition candidate of Malaysian Chinese Association (MCA) and 1990 general election for the Bukit Bendera parliamentary seat as Barisan Nasional coalition candidate of Parti Gerakan Rakyat Malaysia (Gerakan).

== Election results ==
Parliament of Malaysia
Year	Constituency	Candidate	Votes	Pct	Opponent(s)	Votes	Pct	Ballots cast	Majority	Turnout
1964	Tanjong	David Choong Ewe Leong (MCA)	6,271	22.01%	Lim Chong Eu (UDP)	12,928	45.37%	29,165	4,412	83.90%
1964	Tanjong	David Choong Ewe Leong (MCA)	6,271	22.01%	Tan Phock Kin (SF)	8,516	29.89%	29,165	4,412	83.90%
1964	Tanjong	David Choong Ewe Leong (MCA)	6,271	22.01%	Tan Chong Bee (PAP)	778	2.73%	29,165	4,412	83.90%
1990	Bukit Bendera	David Choong Ewe Leong (Gerakan)	15,519	37.40%	Gooi Hock Seng (DAP)	25,978	62.60%	42,310	10,459	74.19%

== Death ==
Choong died on 10 September 2011 in Tanjung Tokong. He was 82.

== Honours ==
=== Honour of Malaysia ===
- Malaysia
  - Member of the Order of the Defender of the Realm (AMN) (1968)
- Penang
  - Lieutenant of the Order of the Defender of State (DSPN) - Dato' (1988)

== Achievements ==
=== International tournaments (30 titles, 13 runners-up) ===
Men's singles
Year	Tournament	Opponent	Score	Result
1949	French Open	(Malaysia) Yat Sun Lau	15–2, 15–2	(gold) Winner
1950	French Open	(Malaysia) Fook Loong Chai	15–3, 15–8	(gold) Winner
1952	French Open	(Malaysia) Eddy Choong	5–15, 8–15	(silver) Runner-up
1953	French Open	(Malaysia) Eddy Choong	3–15, 7–15	(silver) Runner-up
1954	Norwegian International	(Malaysia) Eddy Choong	5–15, 6–15	(silver) Runner-up
1955	German Open	(Malaysia) Eddy Choong	3–15, 15–9, 13–18	(silver) Runner-up
1955	Swiss Open	(Malaysia) Richard Lee	15–4, 15–5	(gold) Winner
1956	Swiss Open	(Malaysia) Eddy Choong	7–15, 1–15	(silver) Runner-up
1957	French Open	(Indonesia) Ferry Sonneville	4–15, 3–15	(silver) Runner-up

Men's doubles
Year	Tournament	Partner	Opponent	Score	Result
1950	French Open	(England) John Newland	(Malaysia) Fook Loong Chai (Malaysia) E. W. Barker	6–15, 15–11, 15–6	(gold) Winner
1951	Scottish Open	(Malaysia) Eddy Choong	(Republic of Ireland) Frank Peard (Republic of Ireland) Jim FItzGibbon	15–12, 15–4	(gold) Winner
1951	All England	(Malaysia) Eddy Choong	(Malaysia) Ong Poh Lim (Malaysia) Ismail Marjan	9–15, 15–7, 15–10	(gold) Winner
1952	Scottish Open	(Malaysia) Eddy Choong	(Scotland) Robert Hodge (Scotland) Wilfred Robinson	15–5, 15–1	(gold) Winner
1952	Irish Open	(Malaysia) Eddy Choong	(Malaysia) Johnny Heah (Republic of Ireland) Jim FitzGibbon	15–11, 15–5	(gold) Winner
1952	All England	(Malaysia) Eddy Choong	(Denmark) Poul Holm (Denmark) Ole Jensen	9–15, 15–12, 15–7	(gold) Winner
1952	French Open	(Malaysia) Eddy Choong	(France) Henri Pellizza (France) Paul Ailloud	15–2, 15–5	(gold) Winner
1952	Malaysia Open	(Malaysia) Law Teik Hock	(Malaysia) Chee Phui Hang (Malaysia) Loong Pan Yap	15–5, 15–5	(gold) Winner
1953	Scottish Open	(Malaysia) Eddy Choong	(Republic of Ireland) Frank Peard (Republic of Ireland) Jim FItzGibbon	15–12, 15–12	(gold) Winner
1953	Irish Open	(Malaysia) Eddy Choong	(Republic of Ireland) Frank Peard (Republic of Ireland) Jim FItzGibbon	15–8, 15–3	(gold) Winner
1953	All England	(Malaysia) Eddy Choong	(Denmark) Poul Holm (Denmark) Ole Jensen	15–5, 15–12	(gold) Winner
1953	Denmark Open	(Malaysia) Eddy Choong	(Denmark) Poul Holm (Denmark) Ole Jensen	15–6, 15–9	(gold) Winner
1953	French Open	(Malaysia) Eddy Choong	(England) Peter Birtwistle (India) S. L. Jaini	15–9, 15–6	(gold) Winner
1954	All England	(Malaysia) Eddy Choong	(Malaysia) Ong Poh Lim (Malaysia) Ooi Teik Hock	16–18, 12–15	(silver) Runner-up
1954	Norwegian International	(Malaysia) Eddy Choong	(Denmark) Leif Jensen (Denmark) Benny Andersen	15–2, 15–0	(gold) Winner
1955	Dutch Open	(Malaysia) Eddy Choong	(Denmark) A. Lillelund (Denmark) Ole Mertz	15–8, 15–3	(gold) Winner
1955	German Open	(Malaysia) Eddy Choong	(Denmark) Erland Olsen (Denmark) Niels Buchholst	15–2, 15–2	(gold) Winner
1955	All England	(Malaysia) Eddy Choong	(Denmark) Finn Kobberø (Denmark) Jørgen Hammergaard Hansen	9–15, 17–14, 11–15	(silver) Runner-up
1955	Swiss Open	(Malaysia) Richard Lee	(France) Paul Ailloud (Brazil) J. Chavez	15–5, 15–5	(gold) Winner
1956	Swiss Open	(Malaysia) Richard Lee	(Malaysia) Eddy Choong (Malaysia) Robert Lim	18–16, 15–13	(gold) Winner
1957	All England	(Malaysia) Eddy Choong	(United States) Joe Alston (Malaysia) Johnny Heah	10–15, 17–16, 5–15	(silver) Runner-up
1957	German Open	(Malaysia) Eddy Choong	(Indonesia) Ferry Sonneville (Denmark) Arne Rasmussen	15–9, 17–18, 15–9	(gold) Winner
1957	French Open	(Indonesia) Ferry Sonneville	(France) Pierre Lenoir (France) Ghislain Vasseur	15–4, 15–9	(gold) Winner

Mixed doubles
Year	Tournament	Partner	Opponent	Score	Result
1949	French Open	(Denmark) Anne Lehmeier	(England) Ralph Nichols (England) Mavis Henderson	15–12, 15–11	(gold) Winner
1950	French Open	(England) Audrey Stone	(Malaysia) Robert Choong (England) Audrey Blathwayt	18–16, 15–5	(gold) Winner
1952	French Open	(England) Mimi Wyatt	(Malaysia) Eddy Choong (England) Queenie Webber	15–12, 1–15, 11–15	(silver) Runner-up
1952	Denmark Open	(Denmark) Tonny Ahm	(Denmark) Ib Olesen (Denmark) Aase Winther	15–8, 15–10	(gold) Winner
1953	Scottish Open	(Scotland) Nancy Horner	(Malaysia) Eddy Choong (Republic of Ireland) Dorothy Donaldson	15–3, 15–7	(gold) Winner
1953	Irish Open	(England) Iris Cooley	(Malaysia) Eddy Choong (England) June White	6–15, 5–15	(silver) Runner-up
1953	Denmark Open	(Denmark) Inger Kjærgaard	(Malaysia) Eddy Choong (Denmark) Agnete Friis	17–18, 5–15	(silver) Runner-up
1953	All England	(England) June White	(Denmark) Poul Holm (Denmark) Agnete Friis	15–6, 15–10	(gold) Winner
1955	German Open	(Denmark) Annelise Hansen	(Malaysia) Eddy Choong (Denmark) Hanne Jensen	15–3, 15–9	(gold) Winner
1955	All England	(England) June White	(Denmark) Finn Kobberø (Denmark) Kirsten Thorndahl	7–15, 13–15	(silver) Runner-up
1957	French Open	(England) Sonia Cambril	(England) Ciro Ciniglio (England) Betty Grace	10–15, 18–17, 15–8	(gold) Winner
