= Poul Holm =

Danish badminton player

Personal information
- Born: 1920
- Died: 2000 (aged 79–80)

Sport
- Country: Denmark
- Sport: Badminton
Medal record
Representing Denmark
Men's badminton
Thomas Cup
Silver medal – second place	1949 Scotland–England	Team

Poul Holm is a Danish former badminton player. He won five All England titles and four Danish singles titles.

== Achievements ==
=== International tournaments ===
Men's singles
Year	Tournament	Opponent	Score	Result
1946	Denmark Open	(Sweden) Conny Jepsen	15–12, 5–15, 8–15	(silver) Runner-up
1947	Denmark Open	(Denmark) Jørn Skaarup	14–18, 15–10, 15–11	(gold) Winner
1948	All England Open	(Denmark) Jørn Skaarup	3–15, 13–15	(silver) Runner-up
1950	All England Open	(Malaysia) Wong Peng Soon	7–15, 10–15	(silver) Runner-up

Men's doubles
Year	Tournament	Partner	Opponent	Score	Result
1947	All England Open	(Denmark) Tage Madsen	(Denmark) Preben Dabelsteen (Denmark) Jørn Skaarup	4–15, 15–12, 15–4	(gold) Winner
1950	All England Open	(Denmark) Børge Frederiksen	(Denmark) Preben Dabelsteen (Denmark) Jørn Skaarup	15–9, 2–15, 12–15	(silver) Runner-up
1952	Denmark Open	(Denmark) Ole Jensen	(Denmark) John Nygaard (Denmark) Ib Olesen	11–15, 15–7, 17–18	(silver) Runner-up
1952	All England Open	(Denmark) Ole Jensen	(Malaysia) David Choong (Malaysia) Eddy Choong	15–9, 12–15, 7–15	(silver) Runner-up
1953	Denmark Open	(Denmark) Ole Jensen	(Malaysia) David Choong (Malaysia) Eddy Choong	6–15, 9–15	(silver) Runner-up
1953	All England Open	(Denmark) Ole Jensen	(Malaysia) David Choong (Malaysia) Eddy Choong	5–15, 12–15	(silver) Runner-up

Mixed doubles
Year	Tournament	Partner	Opponent	Score	Result
1946	Denmark Open	(Denmark) Marie Ussing	(Denmark) Tage Madsen (Denmark) Kirsten Thorndahl	9–15, 7–15	(silver) Runner-up
1947	All England Open	(Denmark) Tonny Ahm	(Denmark) Tage Madsen (Denmark) Kirsten Thorndahl	15–13, 13–15, 15–12	(gold) Winner
1947	Denmark Open	(Denmark) Aase Schiøtt Jacobsen	(Denmark) Tage Madsen (Denmark) Kirsten Thorndahl	15–6, 4–15, 9–15	(silver) Runner-up
1950	All England Open	(Denmark) Tonny Ahm	(Denmark) Jørn Skaarup (Denmark) Birgit Rostgaard-Frøhne	15–3, 15–4	(gold) Winner
1951	All England Open	(Denmark) Tonny Ahm	(Denmark) Arve Lossmann (Denmark) Kirsten Thorndahl	8–15, 15–2, 15–4	(gold) Winner
1952	All England Open	(Denmark) Tonny Ahm	(Denmark) Ole Jensen (Denmark) Aase Schiøtt Jacobsen	15–4, 10–15, 15–7	(gold) Winner
1953	All England Open	(Denmark) Agnete Friis	(Malaysia) David Choong (England) June White	6–15, 10–15	(silver) Runner-up
