= Denmark Open =

Badminton tournament held in Denmark

- Official website
- Founded: 1936; 90 years ago
- Editions: 75 (2026)
- Location: Odense (2026); Denmark
- Venue: SJF Bank Arena (2026)
- Prize money: USD950,000 (2026)

Men's
- Draw: 32S / 32D
- Current champions: Alex Lanier (singles); Fajar Alfian; Muhammad Shohibul Fikri (doubles)
- Most singles titles: 8 Morten Frost
- Most doubles titles: 4 Ng Boon Bee; Li Yongbo; Tian Bingyi; Jon Holst-Christensen; Lars Paaske

Women's
- Draw: 32S / 32D
- Current champions: An Se-young (singles); Pearly Tan; Thinaah Muralitharan (doubles)
- Most singles titles: 8 Tonny Olsen
- Most doubles titles: 5 Tonny Ahm; Kirsten Thorndahl

Mixed doubles
- Draw: 32
- Current champions: Jiang Zhenbang; Wei Yaxin
- Most titles (male): 5 Thomas Lund
- Most titles (female): 5 Nora Perry

Super 750
- China Masters; Denmark Open; French Open; India Open; Japan Open; Singapore Open

Last completed
- 2026 Denmark Open

The Denmark Open, or formerly known as Danish Open, is an annual badminton tournament held in Denmark and organized by Badminton Denmark. It was part of the BWF Super Series from 2011 to 2017. BWF categorised it as one of the five BWF World Tour Super 750 events per the BWF events structure since 2018.

== History ==
The tournament started in 1936 and is one of the world's oldest international badminton tournaments. It was interrupted by World War II and was not held from 1956 to 1965.

Denmark Open became part of the BWF Super Series in 2007 and was upgraded to Super Series Premier status in 2011. Following the introduction of the BWF World Tour in 2018, it was classified as a Super 750 tournament. The 2021 edition edition was temporarily upgraded to Super 1000 following revisions to the BWF tournament calendar. From 2027, the tournament is scheduled to be promoted from Super 750 to Super 1000.

== Locations ==
Eleven locations have been chosen to host the tournament. The 2007 and 2008 tournaments were held in Arena Fyn in Odense. Since 2008, the tournaments have been held in Odense.

- 1936–1939, 1946–1985: Copenhagen
- 1990: Aabenraa
- 1991: Solrød
- 1986, 1992: Aalborg
- 1989, 1993: Højbjerg
- 1987, 1994: Esbjerg
- 1996: Middelfart
- 1997–1999: Vejle
- 2000–2002: Farum
- 2003–2006: Aarhus
- 1988, 1995, 2007–present: Odense
Locations of Denmark Open host cities

== Past winners ==
Year	Men's singles	Women's singles	Men's doubles	Women's doubles	Mixed doubles
1936	(Denmark) Poul Nielsen	(Denmark) Ruth Frederiksen	(Denmark) Aksel Hansen (Denmark) Svenn Strømann	(Denmark) Tonny Olsen (Denmark) Bodil Riise	(Denmark) Poul Nielsen (Denmark) Ruth Frederiksen
1937	(England) Maurice Field	(Denmark) Tonny Olsen	(Republic of Ireland) Thomas Boyle (England) K. Woods	(Denmark) Ruth Dalsgaard (England) Dorothy Graham	(Republic of Ireland) Thomas Boyle (Republic of Ireland) Olive Wilson
1938	(Malaysia) Ong Hock Sim	(England) Daphne Young	(Denmark) Carl Frøhlke (Denmark) Tage Madsen	(Denmark) Tonny Olsen (Denmark) Bodil Riise	(Malaysia) Ong Hock Sim (England) Mavis Green
1939	(Denmark) Tage Madsen	(Denmark) Tonny Olsen	(England) Ralph Nichols (England) Raymond M. White	(England) Queenie Allen (Denmark) Ruth Dalsgaard	(England) Ralph Nichols (England) Bessie Staples
1940– 1945	Not held				
1946	(Sweden) Conny Jepsen	(Denmark) Tonny Olsen	(Denmark) Preben Dabelsteen (Denmark) Jørn Skaarup	(Denmark) Tonny Ahm (Denmark) Kirsten Thorndahl	(Denmark) Tage Madsen (Denmark) Kirsten Thorndahl
1947	(Denmark) Poul Holm	(Denmark) Tonny Olsen	(Denmark) Preben Dabelsteen (Denmark) Jørn Skaarup	(Denmark) Aase Schiøtt Jacobsen (Denmark) Marie Ussing	(Denmark) Tage Madsen (Denmark) Kirsten Thorndahl
1948	(Denmark) Jørn Skaarup	(Denmark) Tonny Olsen	(Denmark) Børge Frederiksen (Denmark) Tage Madsen	(Denmark) Tonny Ahm (Denmark) Kirsten Thorndahl	(Denmark) Tage Madsen (Denmark) Kirsten Thorndahl
1949	(United States) David G. Freeman	(Denmark) Tonny Olsen	(Malaysia) Ooi Teik Hock (Malaysia) Teoh Seng Khoon	(Denmark) Tonny Ahm (Denmark) Kirsten Thorndahl	(Denmark) Chan Kok Leong (Denmark) Tonny Ahm
1950	(Sweden) Nils Jonson	(Denmark) Tonny Olsen	(Denmark) Arve Lossmann (Denmark) John Nygaard	(Denmark) Tonny Ahm (Denmark) Kirsten Thorndahl	(Denmark) Børge Frederiksen (Denmark) Tonny Ahm
1951	(Singapore) Wong Peng Soon	(Denmark) Tonny Olsen	(Singapore) Ong Poh Lim (Singapore) Ismail Marjan	(Denmark) Tonny Ahm (Denmark) Kirsten Thorndahl	(Denmark) Arve Lossmann (Denmark) Kirsten Thorndahl
1952	(Denmark) Jørn Skaarup	(Denmark) Aase Schiøtt Jacobsen	(Denmark) John Nygaard (Denmark) Ib Olesen	(Denmark) Tonny Ahm (Denmark) Kirsten Thorndahl	(Malaysia) David Choong (Denmark) Tonny Ahm
1953	(Malaysia) Eddie Choong	(Denmark) Aase Schiøtt Jacobsen	(Malaysia) David Choong (Malaysia) Eddie Choong	(England) Iris Cooley (England) June White	(Malaysia) Eddie Choong (Denmark) Agnete Friis
1954	Not held				
1955	(Denmark) Finn Kobberø	(Denmark) Aase Schiøtt Jacobsen	(Denmark) Jorgen Hammergaard Hansen (Denmark) Finn Kobberø	(Denmark) Anni Jørgensen (Denmark) Kirsten Thorndahl	(Denmark) Jørn Skaarup (Denmark) Anni Jørgensen
1956– 1965	Not held				
1966	(Denmark) Svend Pri	(Denmark) Lizbeth von Barnekow	(Malaysia) Ng Boon Bee (Malaysia) Tan Yee Khan	(Denmark) Karin Jørgensen (Denmark) Ulla Strand	(Denmark) Finn Kobberø (Denmark) Ulla Strand
1967	(Malaysia) Tan Aik Huang	(Japan) Noriko Takagi	(Malaysia) Ng Boon Bee (Malaysia) Tan Yee Khan	(Japan) Noriko Takagi (Japan) Hiroe Amano	(Denmark) Svend Pri (Denmark) Ulla Strand
1968	(Malaysia) Tan Aik Huang	(Sweden) Eva Twedberg	(Japan) Ippei Kojima (Japan) Kazumasa Nichino	(Japan) Noriko Takagi (Japan) Hiroe Amano	(Denmark) Per Walsøe (Denmark) Pernille Mølgaard
1969	(Denmark) Svend Pri	(Japan) Hiroe Yuki	(Japan) Ippei Kojima (Denmark) Bjørn Andersen	(Japan) Noriko Takagi (Japan) Hiroe Yuki	(Denmark) Henning Borch (Denmark) Imre Rietveld Nielsen
1970	(Japan) Ippei Kojima	(Sweden) Eva Twedberg	(Denmark) Henning Borch (Denmark) Erland Kops	(Japan) Etsuko Takenaka (Japan) Machiko Aizawa	(Denmark) Klaus Kaagaard (Denmark) Ulla Strand
1971	(Indonesia) Rudy Hartono	(Japan) Noriko Takagi	(Malaysia) Ng Boon Bee (Malaysia) Punch Gunalan	(Japan) Noriko Takagi (Japan) Hiroe Yuki	(Denmark) Svend Pri (Denmark) Ulla Strand
1972	(Denmark) Svend Pri	(Sweden) Eva Twedberg	(Malaysia) Ng Boon Bee (Malaysia) Punch Gunalan	(Japan) Noriko Nakayama (Japan) Hiroe Yuki	(West Germany) Wolfgang Bochow (West Germany) Marieluise Wackerow
1973	(Indonesia) Rudy Hartono	(Japan) Hiroe Yuki	(Indonesia) Tjun Tjun (Indonesia) Johan Wahjudi	(Netherlands) Joke van Beusekom (Netherlands) Marjan Luesken	(Denmark) Elo Hansen (Denmark) Ulla Strand
1974	(Denmark) Svend Pri	(Japan) Hiroe Yuki	(Indonesia) Tjun Tjun (Indonesia) Johan Wahjudi	(Japan) Machiko Aizawa (Japan) Etsuko Takenaka	(Denmark) Elo Hansen (Denmark) Ulla Strand
1975	(Indonesia) Rudy Hartono	(Denmark) Lene Køppen	(Indonesia) Tjun Tjun (Indonesia) Johan Wahjudi	(Indonesia) Imelda Wiguna (Indonesia) Theresia Widiastuti	(Indonesia) Tjun Tjun (Indonesia) Regina Masli
1976	(Denmark) Svend Pri	(Denmark) Lene Køppen	(England) David Eddy (England) Eddy Sutton	(Netherlands) Joke van Beusekom (Netherlands) Marjan Luesken	(Denmark) Steen Skovgaard (Denmark) Lene Køppen
1977	(Denmark) Flemming Delfs	(Japan) Hiroe Yuki	(Sweden) Bengt Fröman (Sweden) Thomas Kihlström	(England) Barbara Giles (England) Jane Webster	(Denmark) Steen Skovgaard (Denmark) Lene Køppen
1978	(Indonesia) Liem Swie King	(Denmark) Lene Køppen	(Denmark) Steen Skovgaard (Denmark) Flemming Delfs	(Indonesia) Verawaty Wiharjo (Indonesia) Imelda Wigoeno	(Denmark) Steen Skovgaard (Denmark) Lene Køppen
1979	(Denmark) Flemming Delfs	(Denmark) Lene Køppen	(Japan) Masao Tsuchida (Japan) Yoshitaka Iino	(Japan) Mikiko Takada (Japan) Atsuko Tokuda	(England) Ray Stevens (England) Nora Perry
1980	(India) Prakash Padukone	(Indonesia) Ivanna Lie	(Denmark) Steen Skovgaard (Denmark) Flemming Delfs	(England) Gillian Gilks (England) Nora Perry	(England) Mike Tredgett (England) Nora Perry
1981	(Denmark) Morten Frost	(Denmark) Lene Køppen	(Indonesia) Ade Chandra (Indonesia) Christian Hadinata	(England) Nora Perry (England) Jane Webster	(England) Mike Tredgett (England) Nora Perry
1982	(Denmark) Morten Frost	(China) Wu Jianqui	(South Korea) Park Joo-bong (South Korea) Lee Eun-ku	(China) Lin Ying (China) Wu Dixi	(Sweden) Thomas Kihlström (England) Nora Perry
1983	(Denmark) Morten Frost	(China) Qian Ping	(Sweden) Thomas Kihlström (Sweden) Stefan Karlsson	(England) Nora Perry (England) Jane Webster	(Sweden) Thomas Kihlström (England) Nora Perry
1984	(Denmark) Morten Frost	(Denmark) Kirsten Larsen	(South Korea) Park Joo-bong (South Korea) Kim Moon-soo	(South Korea) Kim Yun-ja (South Korea) Yoo Sang-hee	(England) Martin Dew (England) Gillian Gilks
1985 (I)	(Denmark) Morten Frost	(China) Zheng Yuli	(China) Li Yongbo (China) Tian Bingyi	(South Korea) Kim Yun-ja (South Korea) Yoo Sang-hee	(England) Dipak Tailor (England) Nora Perry
1985 (II)	(Denmark) Morten Frost	(South Korea) Kim Yun-ja	(Denmark) Steen Fladberg (Denmark) Jesper Helledie	(South Korea) Kim Yun-ja (South Korea) Yoo Sang-hee	(England) Nigel Tier (England) Gillian Gowers
1986	(Denmark) Morten Frost	(China) Zheng Yuli	(China) Li Yongbo (China) Tian Bingyi	(England) Gillian Clark (England) Gillian Gowers	(England) Martin Dew (England) Gillian Gilks
1987	(Denmark) Torben Carlsen	(South Korea) Lee Young-suk	(Malaysia) Razif Sidek (Malaysia) Jalani Sidek	(Japan) Atsuko Tokuda (Japan) Yoshiko Tago	(Denmark) Mark Christiansen (Sweden) Maria Bengtsson
1988	(Denmark) Poul-Erik Høyer Larsen	(China) Li Lingwei	(China) Li Yongbo (China) Tian Bingyi	(China) Lin Ying (China) Guan Weizhen	(Denmark) Jesper Knudsen (Denmark) Nettie Nielsen
1989	(Denmark) Morten Frost	(China) Tang Jiuhong	(China) Li Yongbo (China) Tian Bingyi	(China) Lin Ying (China) Guan Weizhen	(Denmark) Jesper Knudsen (Denmark) Nettie Nielsen
1990	(Denmark) Poul-Erik Høyer Larsen	(China) Tang Jiuhong	(China) Li Yongbo (China) Tian Bingyi	(Denmark) Lotte Olsen (Denmark) Dorte Kjær	(Denmark) Thomas Lund (Denmark) Pernille Dupont
1991	(Indonesia) Hermawan Susanto	(Indonesia) Susi Susanti	(China) Zheng Yumin (China) Huang Zhanzhong	(Denmark) Nettie Nielsen (England) Gillian Gowers	(Denmark) Thomas Lund (Denmark) Pernille Dupont
1992	(England) Darren Hall	(Indonesia) Susi Susanti	(Denmark) Thomas Lund (Denmark) Jon Holst-Christensen	(Sweden) Lim Xiaoqing (Sweden) Christine Magnusson	(Denmark) Thomas Lund (Denmark) Pernille Dupont
1993	(Denmark) Poul-Erik Høyer Larsen	(China) Ye Zhaoying	(Denmark) Thomas Lund (Denmark) Jon Holst-Christensen	(Denmark) Lisbeth Stuer-Lauridsen (Denmark) Lotte Olsen	(Denmark) Thomas Lund (Sweden) Catrine Bengtsson
1994	(Denmark) Poul-Erik Høyer Larsen	(Denmark) Camilla Martin	(Indonesia) Denny Kantono (Indonesia) Antonius Budi Ariantho	(Sweden) Lim Xiaoqing (Sweden) Christine Magnusson	(Denmark) Thomas Lund (Denmark) Marlene Thomsen
1995	(Denmark) Poul-Erik Høyer Larsen	(Sweden) Lim Xiaoqing	(Denmark) Thomas Lund (Denmark) Jon Holst-Christensen	(Denmark) Lisbeth Stuer-Lauridsen (Denmark) Marlene Thomsen	(China) Chen Xingdong (China) Peng Xingyong
1996	(Denmark) Thomas Stuer-Lauridsen	(China) Gong Zhichao	(Denmark) Thomas Stavngaard (Denmark) Jim Laugesen	(Denmark) Rikke Olsen (Denmark) Helene Kirkegaard	(Denmark) Michael Søgaard (Denmark) Rikke Olsen
1997	(China) Dong Jiong	(Denmark) Camilla Martin	(Denmark) Jon Holst-Christensen (Denmark) Michael Søgaard	(Denmark) Ann Jørgensen (Denmark) Majken Vange	(Denmark) Jens Eriksen (Denmark) Marlene Thomsen
1998	(Denmark) Peter Gade	(Denmark) Camilla Martin	(Indonesia) Ricky Subagja (Indonesia) Rexy Mainaky	(China) Qin Yiyuan (China) Tang Hetian	(Denmark) Jon Holst-Christensen (Denmark) Ann Jørgensen
1999	(Denmark) Poul-Erik Høyer Larsen	(Denmark) Camilla Martin	(Denmark) Martin Lundgaard Hansen (Denmark) Lars Paaske	(China) Gao Ling (China) Qin Yiyuan	(China) Liu Yong (China) Ge Fei
2000	(Denmark) Peter Gade	(China) Zhou Mi	(Indonesia) Eng Hian (Indonesia) Flandy Limpele	(China) Chen Lin (China) Jiang Xuelian	(Denmark) Michael Søgaard (Denmark) Rikke Olsen
2001	(China) Bao Chunlai	(Denmark) Camilla Martin	(Denmark) Martin Lundgaard Hansen (Denmark) Lars Paaske	(Denmark) Helene Kirkegaard (Denmark) Rikke Olsen	(Indonesia) Tri Kusharjanto (Indonesia) Emma Ermawati
2002	(China) Chen Hong	(Denmark) Camilla Martin	(South Korea) Ha Tae-kwon (South Korea) Kim Dong-moon	(China) Wei Yili (China) Zhao Tingting	(South Korea) Kim Dong-moon (South Korea) Hwang Yu-mi
2003	(China) Lin Dan	(China) Gong Ruina	(South Korea) Ha Tae-kwon (South Korea) Kim Dong-moon	(China) Yang Wei (China) Zhang Jiewen	(South Korea) Kim Dong-moon (South Korea) Ra Kyung-min
2004	(China) Lin Dan	(China) Xie Xingfang	(Denmark) Lars Paaske (Denmark) Jonas Rasmussen	(China) Wei Yili (China) Zhao Tingting	(China) Chen Qiqiu (China) Zhao Tingting
2005	(Malaysia) Lee Chong Wei	(France) Pi Hongyan	(Malaysia) Chan Chong Ming (Malaysia) Koo Kien Keat	(Japan) Kumiko Ogura (Japan) Reiko Shiota	(Denmark) Thomas Laybourn (Denmark) Kamilla Rytter Juhl
2006	(China) Chen Hong	(China) Jiang Yanjiao	(Denmark) Lars Paaske (Denmark) Jonas Rasmussen	(Poland) Kamila Augustyn (Poland) Nadieżda Kostiuczyk	(England) Anthony Clark (England) Donna Kellogg
2007	(China) Lin Dan	(China) Lu Lan	(Malaysia) Koo Kien Keat (Malaysia) Tan Boon Heong	(China) Yang Wei (China) Zhang Jiewen	(China) He Hanbin (China) Yu Yang
2008	(Denmark) Peter Gade	(China) Wang Lin	(Indonesia) Markis Kido (Indonesia) Hendra Setiawan	(Malaysia) Wong Pei Tty (Malaysia) Chin Eei Hui	(Denmark) Joachim Fischer Nielsen (Denmark) Christinna Pedersen
2009	(Indonesia) Simon Santoso	(Denmark) Tine Rasmussen	(Malaysia) Koo Kien Keat (Malaysia) Tan Boon Heong	(China) Pan Pan (China) Zhang Yawen	(Denmark) Joachim Fischer Nielsen (Denmark) Christinna Pedersen
2010	(Denmark) Jan Ø. Jørgensen	(China) Wang Yihan	(Denmark) Mathias Boe (Denmark) Carsten Mogensen	(Japan) Miyuki Maeda (Japan) Satoko Suetsuna	(Denmark) Thomas Laybourn (Denmark) Kamilla Rytter Juhl
2011	(China) Chen Long	(China) Wang Xin	(South Korea) Jung Jae-sung (South Korea) Lee Yong-dae	(China) Wang Xiaoli (China) Yu Yang	(Denmark) Joachim Fischer Nielsen (Denmark) Christinna Pedersen
2012	(Malaysia) Lee Chong Wei	(India) Saina Nehwal	(South Korea) Shin Baek-cheol (South Korea) Yoo Yeon-seong	(China) Ma Jin (China) Tang Jinhua	(China) Xu Chen (China) Ma Jin
2013	(China) Chen Long	(China) Wang Yihan	(South Korea) Lee Yong-dae (South Korea) Yoo Yeon-seong	(China) Bao Yixin (China) Tang Jinhua	(China) Zhang Nan (China) Zhao Yunlei
2014	(China) Chen Long	(China) Li Xuerui	(China) Fu Haifeng (China) Zhang Nan	(China) Wang Xiaoli (China) Yu Yang	(China) Xu Chen (China) Ma Jin
2015	(China) Chen Long	(China) Li Xuerui	(South Korea) Lee Yong-dae (South Korea) Yoo Yeon-seong	(South Korea) Jung Kyung-eun (South Korea) Shin Seung-chan	(South Korea) Ko Sung-hyun (South Korea) Kim Ha-na
2016	(Thailand) Tanongsak Saensomboonsuk	(Japan) Akane Yamaguchi	(Malaysia) Goh V Shem (Malaysia) Tan Wee Kiong	(Japan) Misaki Matsutomo (Japan) Ayaka Takahashi	(Denmark) Joachim Fischer Nielsen (Denmark) Christinna Pedersen
2017	(India) Srikanth Kidambi	(Thailand) Ratchanok Intanon	(China) Liu Cheng (China) Zhang Nan	(South Korea) Lee So-hee (South Korea) Shin Seung-chan	(Hong Kong) Tang Chun Man (Hong Kong) Tse Ying Suet
2018	(Japan) Kento Momota	(Chinese Taipei) Tai Tzu-ying	(Indonesia) Marcus Fernaldi Gideon (Indonesia) Kevin Sanjaya Sukamuljo	(Japan) Yuki Fukushima (Japan) Sayaka Hirota	(China) Zheng Siwei (China) Huang Yaqiong
2019	(Japan) Kento Momota	(Chinese Taipei) Tai Tzu-ying	(Indonesia) Marcus Fernaldi Gideon (Indonesia) Kevin Sanjaya Sukamuljo	(South Korea) Baek Ha-na (South Korea) Jung Kyung-eun	(Indonesia) Praveen Jordan (Indonesia) Melati Daeva Oktavianti
2020	(Denmark) Anders Antonsen	(Japan) Nozomi Okuhara	(England) Marcus Ellis (England) Chris Langridge	(Japan) Yuki Fukushima (Japan) Sayaka Hirota	(Germany) Mark Lamsfuß (Germany) Isabel Herttrich
2021	(Denmark) Viktor Axelsen	(Japan) Akane Yamaguchi	(Japan) Takuro Hoki (Japan) Yugo Kobayashi	(China) Huang Dongping (China) Zheng Yu	(Japan) Yuta Watanabe (Japan) Arisa Higashino
2022	(China) Shi Yuqi	(China) He Bingjiao	(Indonesia) Fajar Alfian (Indonesia) Muhammad Rian Ardianto	(China) Chen Qingchen (China) Jia Yifan	(China) Zheng Siwei (China) Huang Yaqiong
2023	(China) Weng Hongyang	(China) Chen Yufei	(Malaysia) Aaron Chia (Malaysia) Soh Wooi Yik	(China) Chen Qingchen (China) Jia Yifan	(China) Feng Yanzhe (China) Huang Dongping
2024	(Denmark) Anders Antonsen	(China) Wang Zhiyi	(China) Liang Weikeng (China) Wang Chang	(Japan) Rin Iwanaga (Japan) Kie Nakanishi	(China) Feng Yanzhe (China) Huang Dongping
2025	(Indonesia) Jonatan Christie	(South Korea) An Se-young	(Japan) Takuro Hoki (Japan) Yugo Kobayashi	(South Korea) Baek Ha-na (South Korea) Lee So-hee	(China) Feng Yanzhe (China) Huang Dongping
2026	(France) Alex Lanier	(South Korea) An Se-young	(Indonesia) Fajar Alfian (Indonesia) Muhammad Shohibul Fikri	(Malaysia) Pearly Tan (Malaysia) Thinaah Muralitharan	(China) Jiang Zhenbang (China) Wei Yaxin

== Performances by nation ==
As of 2026 edition

Pos.	Nation	MS	WS	MD	WD	XD	Total
1	Denmark*	36	26	21.5	18.5	37	139
2	China	13	23	9	18	13	76
3	Japan	3	9	4.5	15	1	32.5
4	Indonesia	7	3	12	2	3	27
5	England	2	1	4	7.5	11.5	26
6	South Korea		4	8	7	3	22
7	Malaysia	6		12	2	1.5	21.5
8	Sweden	2	4	2	2	2	12
9	India	2	1				3
9	Singapore	1		2			3
11	Chinese Taipei		2				2
11	France	1	1				2
11	Germany					2	2
11	Netherlands				2		2
11	Thailand	1	1				2
16	Hong Kong					1	1
16	Poland				1		1
16	United States	1					1
Total		75	75	75	75	75	375

* Host nation

== Multiple winners ==
=== Men's singles ===
Wins	Winner(s)
8	Morten Frost
6	Poul-Erik Høyer Larsen
5	Svend Pri
4	Chen Long
3	Rudy Hartono
3	Peter Gade
3	Lin Dan
2	Jørn Skaarup
2	Tan Aik Huang
2	Flemming Delfs
2	Chen Hong
2	Lee Chong Wei
2	Kento Momota
2	Anders Antonsen

=== Women's singles ===
Wins	Winner(s)
8	Tonny Olsen
6	Camilla Martin
5	Lene Køppen
4	Hiroe Yuki
3	Aase Schiøtt Jacobsen
3	Eva Twedberg
2	Noriko Takagi
2	Zheng Yuli
2	Tang Jiuhong
2	Susi Susanti
2	Wang Yihan
2	Li Xuerui
2	Akane Yamaguchi
2	Tai Tzu-ying
2	An Se-young
