= 1998 Denmark Open =

Four-star badminton tournament held in 1998

The 1998 Denmark Open in badminton was held in Vejle, from October 14 to October 18, 1998. It was a four-star tournament and the prize money was US$120,000.

== Venue ==
- Vejle Idraets Center, Vejle

== Final results ==
Category	Winners	Runners-up	Score
Men's singles	(Denmark) Peter Gade	(China) Dong Jiong	15–8, 17–14
Women's singles	(Denmark) Camilla Martin	(China) Ye Zhaoying	13–10, 11–8
Men's doubles	(Indonesia) Rexy Mainaky & Ricky Subagja	(Indonesia) Flandy Limpele & Eng Hian	15–11, 15–6
Women's doubles	(China) Qin Yiyuan & Tang Hetian	(China) Huang Nanyan & Yang Wei	15–17, 15–10, 15–11
Mixed doubles	(Denmark) Jon Holst-Christensen & Ann Jorgensen	(Denmark) Michael Sogaard & Rikke Olsen	15–6, 15–14

Preceded by 1997 Denmark Open	Denmark Open	Succeeded by 1999 Denmark Open
