= 2000 Denmark Open =

The 2000 Denmark Open in badminton was held in Farum, Copenhagen, from October 25 to October 29, 2000. It was a five-star tournament and the prize money was US$250,000.

== Venue ==
- Farum Hallen, Farum, Copenhagen

== Final results ==
Category	Winners	Runners-up	Score
Men's singles	(Denmark) Peter Gade-Christensen	(Sweden) George Rimarcdi	15–11, 15–12
Women's singles	(China) Zhou Mi	(Denmark) Camilla Martin	1–11, 11–6, 11–7
Men's doubles	(Indonesia) Flandy Limpele & Eng Hian	(Denmark) Jens Eriksen & Jesper Larsen	15–13, 15–10
Women's doubles	(China) Chen Lin & Jiang Xuelian	(China) Zhang Jiewen & Wei Yili	15–7, 15–3
Mixed doubles	(Denmark) Michael Sogaard & Rikke Olsen	(Denmark) Jens Eriksen & Mette Schjoldager	15–10, 8–15, 15–10

Preceded by 1999 Denmark Open	Denmark Open	Succeeded by 2001 Denmark Open
