= 1997 Denmark Open =

The 1997 Denmark Open in badminton was held in Vejle, from October 15 to October 19, 1997. It was a four-star tournament and the prize money was US$120,000.

== Venue ==
- Vejle, Denmark

== Final results ==
Category	Winners	Runners-up	Score
Men's singles	(China) Dong Jiong	(Denmark) Peter Gade	15–17, 15–11, 15–12
Women's singles	(Denmark) Camilla Martin	(Denmark) Mette Pedersen	11–2, 11–8
Men's doubles	(Denmark) Michael Søgaard & Jon Holst-Christensen	(Denmark) Jens Eriksen & Jesper Larsen	17–14, 15–8
Women's doubles	(Denmark) Ann Jorgensen & Majken Vange	(Japan) Yoshiko Iwata & Haruko Matsuda	18–16, 15–5
Mixed doubles	(Denmark) Jens Eriksen & Marlene Thomsen	(Denmark) Michael Søgaard & Rikke Olsen	15–6, 18–14

Preceded by 1996 Denmark Open	Denmark Open	Succeeded by 1998 Denmark Open
