= Tonny Ahm =

Danish badminton player

Personal information
- Born: Tonny Kristine Olsen; 21 September 1914 Ordrup, Denmark
- Died: 7 April 1993 (aged 78)

Sport
- Country: Denmark
- Sport: Badminton
- Handedness: Right
Medal record
Women's badminton
Representing Denmark
Uber Cup
| Silver medal – second place | 1957 Lancashire | Women's team |

Tonny Kristine Ahm (f. Olsen) (21 September 1914 – 7 April 1993) was a female badminton player from Denmark.

She won 26 Danish National Championships between 1935 and 1957 mainly playing for Gentofte BK. On the international level, She won twelve events at the prestigious All-England Championships, all but one of them after reaching the age of thirty and also 19 titles in all 3 available categories in Denmark Open. In her early forties she played singles for Denmark in the first Uber Cup (women's world team championship) series and helped her team to a second-place finish, losing to the United States in the final.

Ahm was included in the Badminton Hall of Fame in 1997, 4 years after her death.

== Achievements ==
=== International tournaments (41 titles, 12 runners-up) ===
Women's singles
| Year | Tournament | Opponent | Score | Result |
|---|---|---|---|---|
| 1934 | Dutch Open | (Denmark) Bodil Clausen | 5–11, 11–1, 12–14 | (silver) Runner-up |
| 1935 | Dutch Open | (Denmark) Bodil Clausen | 14–10, 14–6 | (gold) Winner |
| 1936 | Dutch Open | (Denmark) Bodil Strømann | 11–3, 11–5 | (gold) Winner |
| 1936 | Denmark Open | (Denmark) Ruth Frederiksen | 14–10, 3–11, 5–11 | (silver) Runner-up |
| 1937 | Denmark Open | (Denmark) Ruth Dalsgaard | walkover | (gold) Winner |
| 1938 | Denmark Open | (England) Daphne Young | 9–11, 11–12 | (silver) Runner-up |
| 1939 | Denmark Open | (England) Queenie Allen | 11–5, 11–4 | (gold) Winner |
| 1946 | Denmark Open | (Denmark) Agnete Friis | 11–3, 5–11, 11–2 | (gold) Winner |
| 1947 | Denmark Open | (Denmark) Kirsten Thorndahl | walkover | (gold) Winner |
| 1948 | All England Open | (Denmark) Kirsten Thorndahl | 7–11, 0–11 | (silver) Runner-up |
| 1948 | Denmark Open | (Denmark) Kirsten Thorndahl | 11–12, 11–5, 11–3 | (gold) Winner |
| 1949 | Denmark Open | (Denmark) Kirsten Thorndahl | 11–4, 11–3 | (gold) Winner |
| 1950 | All England Open | (Denmark) Aase Schiøtt Jacobsen | 11–4, 11–6 | (gold) Winner |
| 1950 | Denmark Open | (Denmark) Kirsten Thorndahl | 11–8, 11–0 | (gold) Winner |
| 1951 | All England Open | (Denmark) Aase Schiøtt Jacobsen | 6–11, 2–11 | (silver) Runner-up |
| 1951 | Denmark Open | (Denmark) Aase Svendsen | 11–2, 11–3 | (gold) Winner |
| 1952 | All England Open | (Denmark) Aase Schiøtt Jacobsen | 11–4, 11–2 | (gold) Winner |
| 1956 | Denmark Open | (Denmark) Aase Schiøtt Jacobsen | 8–11, 11–0, 7–11 | (silver) Runner-up |
| 1957 | Scottish Open | (Denmark) Tonny Petersen | 7–11, 11–2, 11–9 | (gold) Winner |

Women's doubles
| Year | Tournament | Partner | Opponent | Score | Result |
|---|---|---|---|---|---|
| 1934 | Dutch Open | (Denmark) Bodil Clausen | (Netherlands) Co Jansen (Netherlands) Annie Koch-Ernst | 15–3, 15–6 | (gold) Winner |
| 1935 | Dutch Open | (Denmark) Bodil Clausen | (Netherlands) Co Jansen (Netherlands) Annie Koch-Ernst | 15–8, 15–2 | (gold) Winner |
| 1936 | Dutch Open | (Denmark) Bodil Strømann | (Denmark) Rehberg (Netherlands) Roos | 15–0, 15–3 | (gold) Winner |
| 1936 | Denmark Open | (Denmark) Bodil Riise | (Denmark) Gerda Frederiksen (Denmark) Ruth Frederiksen | 15–8, 11–15, 18–14 | (gold) Winner |
| 1937 | Denmark Open | (Denmark) Bodil Riise | (Denmark) Ruth Dalsgaard (England) Dorothy Graham | 4–15, 7–15 | (silver) Runner-up |
| 1938 | Denmark Open | (Denmark) Bodil Riise | (England) Mavis Green (England) Daphne Young | 15–11, 15–12 | (gold) Winner |
| 1939 | All England Open | (Denmark) Ruth Dalsgaard | (England) Marjorie Barrett (England) Diana Doveton | 15–11, 2–15, 17–15 | (gold) Winner |
| 1946 | Denmark Open | (Denmark) Kirsten Thorndahl | (Denmark) Agnete Friis (Denmark) Marie Ussing | 15–10, 15–7 | (gold) Winner |
| 1947 | All England Open | (Denmark) Kirsten Thorndahl | (Denmark) Aase Schiøtt Jacobsen (Denmark) Marie Ussing | 15–8, 15–7 | (gold) Winner |
| 1947 | Denmark Open | (Denmark) Kirsten Thorndahl | (Denmark) Aase Schiøtt Jacobsen (Denmark) Marie Ussing | 7–15, 15–5, 4–15 | (silver) Runner-up |
| 1948 | All England Open | (Denmark) Kirsten Thorndahl | (England) Queenie Allen (England) Betty Uber | 15–6, 12–15, 15–2 | (gold) Winner |
| 1948 | Denmark Open | (Denmark) Kirsten Thorndahl | (England) Queenie Allen (England) Betty Uber | 15–4, 15–11 | (gold) Winner |
| 1949 | All England Open | (Denmark) Kirsten Thorndahl | (England) Queenie Allen (England) Betty Uber | 8–15, 10–15 | (silver) Runner-up |
| 1949 | Denmark Open | (Denmark) Kirsten Thorndahl | (Denmark) Inge Birgit Hansen (Denmark) Aase Svendsen | 15–8, 15–1 | (gold) Winner |
| 1950 | All England Open | (Denmark) Kirsten Thorndahl | (England) Queenie Allen (England) Betty Uber | 16–17, 15–5, 15–8 | (gold) Winner |
| 1950 | Denmark Open | (Denmark) Kirsten Thorndahl | (England) Queenie Allen (England) Elisabeth O'Beirne | 15–2, 15–6 | (gold) Winner |
| 1951 | All England Open | (Denmark) Kirsten Thorndahl | (England) Mavis Henderson (England) Queenie Webber | 17–15, 15–7 | (gold) Winner |
| 1951 | Denmark Open | (Denmark) Kirsten Thorndahl | (Denmark) Aase Svendsen (Denmark) Inge Sørensen | 16–17, 18–13, 15–4 | (gold) Winner |
| 1952 | All England Open | (Denmark) Aase Schiøtt Jacobsen | (England) Betty Uber (England) Queenie Webber | 18–15, 15–4 | (gold) Winner |
| 1952 | Denmark Open | (Denmark) Kirsten Thorndahl | (Denmark) Agnete Friis (Denmark) Aase Schiøtt Jacobsen | 15–7, 15–3 | (gold) Winner |
| 1956 | Denmark Open | (Denmark) Aase Schiøtt Jacobsen | (Denmark) Anni Jorgensen (Denmark) Kirsten Thorndahl | 2–15, 6–15 | (silver) Runner-up |
| 1957 | Scottish Open | (Denmark) Tonny Petersen | (Republic of Ireland) Yvonne Kelly (Republic of Ireland) Mary O'Sullivan | 15–10, 4–15, 15–7 | (gold) Winner |

Mixed doubles
| Year | Tournament | Partner | Opponent | Score | Result |
|---|---|---|---|---|---|
| 1934 | Dutch Open | (Denmark) Sven Strømann | (Netherlands) J. de Haas (Netherlands) Co Jansen | 15–4, 15–0 | (gold) Winner |
| 1935 | Dutch Open | (Denmark) K. Sandvad | (Denmark) Sven Strømann (Denmark) Bodil Clausen | 15–12, 17–16 | (gold) Winner |
| 1936 | Dutch Open | (Denmark) K. Sandvad | (Denmark) Sven Strømann (Denmark) Bodil Strømann | 15–9, 11–15, 18–13 | (gold) Winner |
| 1937 | Denmark Open | (England) Maurice Field | (Republic of Ireland) Thomas Boyle (Republic of Ireland) Olive Wilson | 7–15, 2–15 | (silver) Runner-up |
| 1947 | All England Open | (Denmark) Poul Holm | (Denmark) Tage Madsen (Denmark) Kirsten Thorndahl | 15–13, 13–15, 15–12 | (gold) Winner |
| 1948 | Denmark Open | (Denmark) Jørn Skaarup | (Denmark) Tage Madsen (Denmark) Kirsten Thorndahl | 13–18, 15–8, 7–15 | (silver) Runner-up |
| 1949 | Denmark Open | (Malaysia) Chan Kon Leong | (Denmark) Tage Madsen (Denmark) Kirsten Thorndahl | 9–15, 15–12, 15–2 | (gold) Winner |
| 1950 | All England Open | (Denmark) Poul Holm | (Denmark) Jørn Skaarup (Denmark) Birgit Rostgaard-Frøhne | 15–3, 15–4 | (gold) Winner |
| 1950 | Denmark Open | (Denmark) Børge Frederiksen | (Denmark) Arve Lossmann (Denmark) Kirsten Thorndahl | 9–15, 18–14, 15–4 | (gold) Winner |
| 1951 | All England Open | (Denmark) Poul Holm | (Denmark) Arve Lossmann (Denmark) Kirsten Thorndahl | 8–15, 15–2, 15–4 | (gold) Winner |
| 1952 | All England Open | (Denmark) Poul Holm | (Denmark) Ole Jensen (Denmark) Aase Schiøtt Jacobsen | 15–4, 10–15, 15–7 | (gold) Winner |
| 1952 | Denmark Open | (Malaysia) David Choong | (Denmark) Ib Olesen (Denmark) Aase Winther | 15–8, 15–10 | (gold) Winner |

== Summary ==
| Rank | Event | Date | Venue |
|---|---|---|---|
Open Championships
| 1 | Mixed doubles | 1947, 1950, 1951, 1952 | All England Open |
| 1 | Women's doubles | 1939, 1947, 1948, 1950, 1951, 1952 | All England Open |
| 1 | Singles | 1950, 1952 | All England Open |
| 1 | Women's doubles | 1935-36, 1937–38, 1945–46, 1947–48, 1948–49, 1949–50, 1950–51, 1951–52 | Denmark Open |
| 1 | Singles | 1936-37, 1938–39, 1945–46, 1946–47, 1947–48, 1948–49, 1949–50, 1950–51 | Denmark Open |
| 1 | Mixed doubles | 1948-49, 1949–50, 1951–52 | Denmark Open |
| 1 | Women's doubles | 1934, 1935, 1936 | Dutch Open |
| 1 | Singles | 1935, 1936 | Dutch Open |
| 1 | Mixed doubles | 1934, 1935, 1936 | Dutch Open |
| 1 | Women's doubles | 1957 | Scottish Open |
| 1 | Singles | 1957 | Scottish Open |
| 2 | Singles | 1948, 1951 | All England Open |
| 2 | Women's doubles | 1949 | All England Open |
