= 1991 Denmark Open =

Badminton championships

The 1991 Denmark Open in badminton was a three-star tournament held in Solroed, from 16 to 20 October 1991.

== Final results ==
Category	Winners	Runners-up	Score
Men's singles	(Indonesia) Hermawan Susanto	(Denmark) Poul-Erik Høyer Larsen	8–15, 15–12, 15–8
Women's singles	(Indonesia) Susi Susanti	(China) Huang Hua	11–5, 6–11, 11–8
Men's doubles	(China) Zheng Yumin & Huang Zhanzhong	(South Korea) Park Joo-bong & Kim Moon-soo	15–10, 15–9
Women's doubles	(Denmark) Nettie Nielsen & (England) Gillian Gowers	(Indonesia) Lili Tampi & Finarsih	15–7, 15–6
Mixed doubles	(Denmark) Thomas Lund & Pernille Dupont	(Denmark) Jon Holst-Christensen & Grete Mogensen	15–7, 6–15, 15–7

Preceded by 1990 Denmark Open	Denmark Open	Succeeded by 1992 Denmark Open
