= Tage Madsen =

Danish badminton player

Personal information
- Born: 1 February 1919
- Died: 2004 (aged 84–85)

Sport
- Country: Denmark
- Sport: Badminton
- Career title: 1939 All England

Tage Madsen (1919–2004) was a Danish badminton player. He won the All England Championships, considered the unofficial World Badminton Championships, in the men's singles in 1939. Tage also won 6 titles in all 3 available disciplines in Denmark Open from 1938 to 1939 and 1946–1948.

== Achievements ==
=== International tournaments (9 titles, 4 runners-up) ===
Men's singles
Year	Tournament	Opponent	Score	Result
1938	Welsh International	(Federated Malay States) A. S. Samuel	15–13, 15–9	(gold) Winner
1939	All England Open	(England) Ralph Nichols	10–15, 18–13, 15–7	(gold) Winner
1939	Denmark Open	(England) Ralph Nichols	15–10, 15–9	(gold) Winner

Men's doubles
Year	Tournament	Partner	Opponent	Score	Result
1938	Denmark Open	(Denmark) Carl Frøhlke	(Denmark) Gunnar Holm (Denmark) Jan Schmidt	15–12, 15–6	(gold) Winner
1939	Denmark Open	(Denmark) Carl Frøhlke	(England) Ralph Nichols (England) Raymond M. White	6–15, 3–15	(silver) Runner-up
1947	Denmark Open	(Denmark) Carl Frøhlke	(Denmark) Preben Dabelsteen (Denmark) Jørn Skaarup	15–18, 15–11, 13–18	(silver) Runner-up
1947	All England Open	(Denmark) Poul Holm	(Denmark) Preben Dabelsteen (Denmark) Jørn Skaarup	4–15, 15–12, 15–4	(gold) Winner
1948	Denmark Open	(Denmark) Børge Frederiksen	(Denmark) Preben Dabelsteen (Denmark) Jørn Skaarup	7–15, 15–13, 15–9	(gold) Winner

Mixed doubles
Year	Tournament	Partner	Opponent	Score	Result
1946	Denmark Open	(Denmark) Kirsten Thorndahl	(Denmark) Poul Holm (Denmark) Marie Ussing	15–9, 15–7	(gold) Winner
1947	Denmark Open	(Denmark) Kirsten Thorndahl	(Denmark) Poul Holm (Denmark) Aase Schiøtt Jacobsen	6–15, 15–4, 15–9	(gold) Winner
1947	All England Open	(Denmark) Kirsten Thorndahl	(Denmark) Poul Holm (Denmark) Tonny Ahm	13–15, 15–13, 12–15	(silver) Runner-up
1948	Denmark Open	(Denmark) Kirsten Thorndahl	(Denmark) Jørn Skaarup (Denmark) Tonny Ahm	18–13, 8–15, 15–7	(gold) Winner
1949	Denmark Open	(Denmark) Kirsten Thorndahl	(Malaysia) Chan Kon Leong (Denmark) Tonny Ahm	15–9, 12–15, 2–15	(silver) Runner-up
