= Marie U. Nylen =

Danish-American biologist, dentist, microscopist, and badminton player

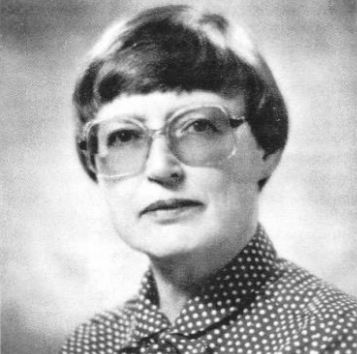
- Born: Denmark
- Education: Royal Dental College, University of Copenhagen
- Children: 3
- Scientific career
- Fields: Dental research, electron microscopy
- Workplaces: Royal Dental College; National Institute of Dental and Craniofacial Research

Marie Ussing Nylen (born 13 Apr 1924) is a Danish-American biologist, dentist, microscopist, and badminton player known for her research on the morphology of tooth enamel and her contributions to refining the electron microscope as an aide in dental research at the National Institute of Dental and Craniofacial Research (NIDR). She was the first woman director of the NIDR's Intramural Research Program. Nylen became director of the NIDR extramural research program in 1984. In 1947 and 1953, she won the women's world singles event at the All England Open Badminton Championship.

== Education ==
Nylen is from Denmark. She completed a D.D.S. at the Royal Dental College, University of Copenhagen (Danish language reference) in 1947. Nylen first went to the United States from her native Denmark in the summer of 1949 on a two-month visit to a friend in Washington, DC. During her stay she called on one of her former professors from the Royal Dental College of the University of Copenhagen, who at that time was a visiting scientist here in the National Institute of Dental Research (NIDR). He interested her in the possibility of obtaining special training at NIH. As a result, she applied for and received a postdoctoral fellowship in dentistry from NIDR and trained here from 1950 to 1951 in the use of electron microscopy and diffraction in studies of calcified tissues of the mouth. Among her early contributions to this new and unique field of dental research was the perfection of a modified microtome capable of producing high quality ultrathin sections of dental tissues for electron microscope study. Development of this instrument, capable of cutting sections 1/50,000 of a mm. in thickness, permitted the study of hitherto unobserved structures of cells which form enamel and dentin.

== Career ==
After her year at NIH, Nylen returned to Copenhagen where she was an assistant professor in oral diagnosis at her alma mater for two years. In 1955, she came back to Bethesda to join the staff of NIDR's laboratory of histology and pathology. In 1965, Nylen became chief of NIDR's laboratory of biological structure. In July 1977, she became the first woman director of NIDR intramural research. She succeeded acting director Wallace D. Armstrong.

In 1984, Nylen became associate director of the NIDR extramural program, succeeding John F. Goggins. Abner L. Notkins replaced Nylen as acting intramural director. In her new position, Nylen administered the institute's extramural program. This component consisted of three categorical branches which fund research in periodontal and soft tissue diseases, craniofacial anomalies, pain control and behavior, and caries and restorative materials.

She was an associate editor of the Scandinavian Journal of Dental Research and Oral Sciences Reviews, a member of the advisory editorial boards of Calcified Tissue Research and Acta Odontologica Scandinavica, and a member of the publications committee, Journal of Dental Research. She served for 4 years as a member of the NIH Oral Biology and Medicine Study Section, reviewing NIDR research grant applications, and more recently as a member of the Caries Executive Committee, reviewing contract proposals for the institute's National Caries Program.

=== Research ===
Nylen was known for her research on the morphology of tooth enamel and her contributions to refining the electron microscope as an aide in dental research. By 1960, Nylen was recognized for her the production and maturation of the organic matrices of enamel and dentin. Her work in this field led to the publication of an atlas, reporting one of the first embryological studies of dental tissues made at the electron microscope level. Because of its breadth and systematic approach to an understanding of dental histogenesis, this publication has been well received by teachers both in the U.S. and abroad. Other technical advances associated with Nylen's work have included important techniques for the preparation and imbedding of specimens for electron microscopy and specimen preparation for microradiography. She has also contributed to the scientific literature in related areas, including basic studies of the mechanism of mineralization, using other calcifying systems such as tendon, reconstituted collagen, and calculus.

Nylen's dental studies have added to scientific knowledge in areas such as the ultrastructural morphology of teeth and bones, and the calcification of tissue. Her findings of the effects of tetracycline on dental enamel of experimental animals contributed to restrictions on the use of this antibiotic in humans. She is also being cited for her administrative abilities.

== Badminton ==
Nylen was four times co-winner of the women's doubles championship of Denmark, and in 1947 and 1953, she won the women's world singles event at the All England Open Badminton Championship. She was women's badminton champion of DC in 1950 and 1951 and also won the New England championship in 1951. As of August 1960, Nylen was an active member of the DC Badminton Club.

=== Achievements ===
==== International tournaments ====
Women's singles

Year	Tournament	Opponent	Score	Result
1947	All England Open	(Denmark) Kirsten Thorndahl	11–6, 6–11, 12–10	(gold) Winner
1952	Denmark Open	(Denmark) Aase Schiøtt Jacobsen	8–11, 8–11	(silver) Runner-up
1953	All England Open	(Denmark) Agnete Friis	11–2, 7–11, 11–2	(gold) Winner

Women's doubles

Year	Tournament	Partner	Opponent	Score	Result
1946	Denmark Open	(Denmark) Agnete Friis	(Denmark) Tonny Ahm (Denmark) Kirsten Thorndahl	10–15, 7–15	(silver) Runner-up
1947	Denmark Open	(Denmark) Aase Schiøtt Jacobsen	(Denmark) Tonny Ahm (Denmark) Kirsten Thorndahl	15–7, 5–15, 15–4	(gold) Winner
1947	All England Open	(Denmark) Aase Schiøtt Jacobsen	(Denmark) Tonny Ahm (Denmark) Kirsten Thorndahl	8–15, 7–15	(silver) Runner-up
1953	Denmark Open	(Denmark) Aase Schiøtt Jacobsen	(England) Iris Cooley (England) June White	16–17, 1–15	(silver) Runner-up
1953	All England Open	(Denmark) Agnete Friis	(England) Iris Cooley (England) June White	15–11, 2–15, 9–15	(silver) Runner-up

Mixed doubles

Year	Tournament	Partner	Opponent	Score	Result
1946	Denmark Open	(Denmark) Poul Holm	(Denmark) Tage Madsen (Denmark) Kirsten Thorndahl	9–15, 7–15	(silver) Runner-up

== Personal life ==
Marie Ussing was born on 13 April 1924 in Copenhagen, Denmark, the daughter of Henry Ussing (Danish language reference), professor of law, University of Copenhagen and wife Christiane Johanne Ussing (born Nyebølle). When she returned to NIH in 1955 she settled in Washington, DC with her husband Aage Nylén, a former Norwegian citizen. Aage Nylén was vice president of the hospitality division of Guest Services Inc., a quasi-public firm that operates government cafeterias and recreational facilities. Before joining GSI, he was associated with the Marriott Corp., the Shoreham Hotel and the Statler-Hilton (now the Capital Hilton). He had also been managing director of The Madison hotel.

They had a daughter and two sons, Ingrid Nylén, Erik Nylén and Thomas Nylén. Nylen became a U.S. citizen in May 1959. In 1966 the family moved to Bethesda. Nylen took up golf and became an accomplished player. She also enjoys playing contract bridge.

== Awards and honors ==
Nylen won the 1970 International Association for Dental Research (IADR)'s annual award for basic research in biological mineralization. The award was sponsored by Lever Brothers. Nylen was given the honorary degree of Doctor Odontologiae by her alma mater in 1973. Other honors include the Superior Service Honor Award of the US Department of Health, Education, and Welfare. On December 3, 1975, Nylen was 1 of 6 who presented with the Federal Woman's Award from the International Association for Dental Research for her contribution to the field of crystallization and mineralization. She was a fellow of the American College of Dentists. In 1979, Nylen received a DHEW Distinguished Service award, the highest departmental honorary recognition conferred on civilian employees. She received an honorary degree of Doctor of Science from Georgetown University. Nylen has served as president for both the American Association for Dental Research and the IADR, in both organizations the first woman to serve as president.
