= 1992 Denmark Open =

The 1992 Denmark Open in badminton was a three-star tournament held in Odense, from October 14 to October 18, 1992.

== Final results ==
Category	Winners	Runners-up	Score
Men's singles	(England) Darren Hall	(Denmark) Poul-Erik Høyer Larsen	15–11, 18–13
Women's singles	(Indonesia) Susi Susanti	(Sweden) Lim Xiaoqing	11–3, 11–3
Men's doubles	(Denmark) Thomas Lund & Jon Holst-Christensen	(Denmark) Jan Paulsen & Henrik Svarrer	18–16, 15–8
Women's doubles	(Sweden) Lim Xiaoqing & Christine Magnusson	(Sweden) Maria Bengtsson & Catrine Bengtsson	15–7, 15–3
Mixed doubles	(Denmark) Thomas Lund & Pernille Dupont	(Denmark) Jon Holst-Christensen & Anne Mette Bille	15–10, 15–9

Preceded by 1991 Denmark Open	Denmark Open	Succeeded by 1993 Denmark Open
