= 1990 Denmark Open =

The 1990 Denmark Open in badminton was a three-star tournament held in Aabenraa, from October 24 to October 28, 1990.

== Final results ==
Category	Winners	Runners-up	Score
Men's singles	(Denmark) Poul-Erik Høyer Larsen	(Denmark) Morten Frost Hansen	4–15, 15–10, 17–14
Women's singles	(China) Tang Jiuhong	(China) Zhou Lei	11–3, 11–2
Men's doubles	(China) Li Yongbo & Tian Bingyi	(Denmark) Jesper Knudsen & Thomas Stuer-Lauridsen	15–8, 15–6
Women's doubles	(Denmark) Lotte Olsen & Dorte Kjær	(England) Gillian Gowers & Gillian Clark	15–13, 9–15, 15–11
Mixed doubles	(Denmark) Thomas Lund & Pernille Dupont	(Denmark) Henrik Svarrer & Marlene Thomsen	15–4, 15–10

Preceded by 1989 Denmark Open	Denmark Open	Succeeded by 1991 Denmark Open
