= 1999 Denmark Open =

Badminton championships

The 1999 Denmark Open in badminton was held in Vejle, from 13 to 17 October 1999. It was a four-star tournament and the prize money was US$120,000.

== Venue ==
- Vejle Center, Denmark

== Final results ==
Category	Winners	Runners-up	Score
Men's singles	(Denmark) Poul-Erik Hoyer-Larsen	(Malaysia) Wong Choong Hann	17–15, 15–4
Women's singles	(Denmark) Camilla Martin	(China) Zhou Mi	8–11, 11–4, 11–1
Men's doubles	(Denmark) Martin Lundgaard Hansen & Lars Paaske	(Denmark) Jim Laugesen & Michael Sogaard	15–13, 15–10
Women's doubles	(China) Gao Ling & Qin Yiyuan	(China) Chen Lin & Jiang Xuelian	15–12, 15–8
Mixed doubles	(China) Liu Yong & Ge Fei	(China) Zhang Jun & Gao Ling	15–12, 17–14

Preceded by 1998 Denmark Open	Denmark Open	Succeeded by 2000 Denmark Open
