= Aase Schiøtt Jacobsen =

Danish badminton player

Personal information
- Born: 1925
- Died: 2005 (aged 79–80)

Sport
- Country: Denmark
- Sport: Badminton
Medal record
Women's badminton
Representing Denmark
Uber Cup
Silver medal – second place	1957 Lancashire	Women's team

Aase Schiøtt Jacobsen was a Danish badminton player.

== Career ==
Aase Schiøtt Jacobsen won the women's singles title at the 1949 All England Badminton Championships and the 1951 All England Badminton Championships.

Jacobsen also represented Denmark at the 1957 Uber Cup and won three Danish National Championships.

== Achievements ==
=== International tournaments (12 titles, 9 runners-up) ===
Women's singles
Year	Tournament	Opponent	Score	Result
1949	All England Open	(Denmark) Aase Svendsen	8–11, 11–8, 11–4	(gold) Winner
1950	All England Open	(Denmark) Tonny Ahm	4–11, 6–11	(silver) Runner-up
1951	All England Open	(Denmark) Tonny Ahm	11–6, 11–2	(gold) Winner
1952	Denmark Open	(Denmark) Marie Ussing	11–8, 11–8	(gold) Winner
1952	All England Open	(Denmark) Tonny Ahm	4–11, 2–11	(silver) Runner-up
1953	Denmark Open	(Denmark) Birgit Schultz-Pedersen	11–6, 11–7	(gold) Winner
1953	French Open	(England) Betty Grace	11–0, 11–7	(gold) Winner
1956	Denmark Open	(Denmark) Tonny Ahm	11–8, 0–11, 11–7	(gold) Winner
1956	Swedish Open	(Sweden) Ulla-Britt Lagerström	11–6, 11–1	(gold) Winner
1959	German Open	(Denmark) Agnete Friis	12–10, 11–1	(gold) Winner

Women's doubles
Year	Tournament	Partner	Opponent	Score	Result
1947	Denmark Open	(Denmark) Marie Ussing	(Denmark) Tonny Ahm (Denmark) Kirsten Thorndahl	15–7, 5–15, 15–4	(gold) Winner
1947	All England Open	(Denmark) Marie Ussing	(Denmark) Tonny Ahm (Denmark) Kirsten Thorndahl	8–15, 7–15	(silver) Runner-up
1952	Denmark Open	(Denmark) Agnete Friis	(Denmark) Tonny Ahm (Denmark) Kirsten Thorndahl	7–15, 3–15	(silver) Runner-up
1952	All England Open	(Denmark) Tonny Ahm	(England) Queenie Allen (England) Betty Uber	18–15, 15–4	(gold) Winner
1953	Denmark Open	(Denmark) Marie Ussing	(England) Iris Cooley (England) June White	16–17, 1–15	(silver) Runner-up
1953	French Open	(Denmark) Annelise Petersen	(England) Jenifer Peters (England) Betty Grace	8–15, 15–4, 15–11	(gold) Winner
1956	Denmark Open	(Denmark) Tonny Ahm	(Denmark) Anni Jorgensen (Denmark) Kirsten Thorndahl	2–15, 6–15	(silver) Runner-up
1959	German Open	(Denmark) Agnete Friis	(Denmark) Karin Rasmussen (Denmark) Annette Schmidt	15–12, 15–6	(gold) Winner

Mixed doubles
Year	Tournament	Partner	Opponent	Score	Result
1947	Denmark Open	(Denmark) Poul Holm	(Denmark) Tage Madsen (Denmark) Kirsten Thorndahl	15–6, 4–15, 9–15	(silver) Runner-up
1952	All England Open	(Denmark) Ole Jensen	(Denmark) Poul Holm (Denmark) Tonny Ahm	4–15, 15–10, 7–15	(silver) Runner-up
1959	German Open	(Denmark) Arne Rasmussen	(Denmark) Poul-Erik Nielsen (Denmark) Agnete Friis	15–6, 13–15, 13–15	(silver) Runner-up
