= Agnete Friis (badminton) =

Danish badminton player (1920–2013)

Personal information
- Born: 1920
- Died: February 4, 2013 (aged 92–93)

Sport
- Country: Denmark
- Sport: Badminton

Agnete Friis (married name Varn) was a Danish badminton player. She became Danish Champion in the women's singles in 1941 and 1944 and nine times in women's doubles from 1941 to 1958. She played for the national team until the end of the 1950s. She also reached three All England Championship Finals in all three categories in 1953. In the singles final she lost to Marie Ussing; the two of them lost the doubles final to Iris Cooley and June White of Great Britain and in the mixed doubles with Poul Holm, they were defeated by Eddy Choong and June White.

== Achievements ==
=== International tournaments (8 titles, 9 runners-up) ===
Women's singles
Year	Tournament	Opponent	Score	Result
1946	Denmark Open	(Denmark) Tonny Ahm	3–11, 11–5, 2–11	(silver) Runner-up
1953	All England Open	(Denmark) Marie Ussing	2–11, 11–7, 2–11	(silver) Runner-up
1956	Dutch Open	(England) Barbara Carpenter	9–11, 11–1, 11–2	(gold) Winner
1959	German Open	(Denmark) Aase Schiøtt Jacobsen	2–11, 11–7, 2–11	(silver) Runner-up

Women's doubles
Year	Tournament	Partner	Opponent	Score	Result
1946	Denmark Open	(Denmark) Marie Ussing	(Denmark) Tonny Ahm (Denmark) Kirsten Thorndahl	10–15, 7–15	(silver) Runner-up
1952	Denmark Open	(Denmark) Aase Schiøtt Jacobsen	(Denmark) Tonny Ahm (Denmark) Kirsten Thorndahl	7–15, 3–15	(silver) Runner-up
1953	All England Open	(Denmark) Marie Ussing	(England) Iris Cooley (England) June White	15–11, 2–15, 9–15	(silver) Runner-up
1956	Dutch Open	(Denmark) Annelise Petersen	(England) Barbara Carpenter (England) June Timperley	9–15, 4–15	(silver) Runner-up
1957	German Open	(Denmark) Hanne Jensen	(Denmark) Inger Kjærgaard (Denmark) Bitten Nielsen	18–14, 15–11	(gold) Winner
1958	Dutch Open	(Denmark) Inger Kjærgaard	(England) Iris Rogers (England) June Timperley	5–15, 5–15	(silver) Runner-up
1959	German Open	(Denmark) Aase Schiøtt Jacobsen	(Denmark) Karin Rasmussen (Denmark) Annette Schmidt	15–12, 15–6	(gold) Winner
1959	Norwegian International	(Denmark) Hanne Andersen	(Sweden) Lisbeth Friberg (Sweden) Berit Olsson	15–3, 15–1	(gold) Winner
1960	German Open	(Denmark) Inger Kjærgaard	(Denmark) Karin Rasmussen (Denmark) Annette Schmidt	15–13, 15–6	(gold) Winner

Mixed doubles
Year	Tournament	Partner	Opponent	Score	Result
1953	Denmark Open	(Malaysia) Eddy Choong	(Malaysia) David Choong (Denmark) Inger Kjærgaard	18–17, 15–5	(gold) Winner
1953	All England Open	(Denmark) Poul Holm	(Malaysia) David Choong (England) June White	6–15, 10–15	(silver) Runner-up
1957	German Open	(Denmark) Erland Kops	(Malaysia) Eddy Choong (England) Barbara Carpenter	15–6, 15–10	(gold) Winner
1959	German Open	(Denmark) Poul-Erik Nielsen	(Denmark) Arne Rasmussen (Denmark) Aase Schiøtt Jacobsen	6–15, 15–13, 15–13	(gold) Winner
