= John Timperley (badminton) =

English badminton and squash player

Personal information
- Born: 1931
- Died: 2013 (aged 81–82)

Sport
- Country: England
- Sport: Badminton

John Timperley was an English badminton & squash player. Born in 1931 he was capped by the England badminton team and reached the National number one ranking before switching to squash. During his squash career he played for Surrey and captained the Surrey over 45's. He became a coach and official, refereeing the British Open Squash Championships Final at Wembley. He was married to June Timperley née White a leading badminton player.

He competed in the All England Badminton Championships from 1954 until 1958.
