= Nancy Horner =

Scottish badminton player and official

Personal information
- Born: 1925
- Died: 1984 (aged 58–59)

Sport
- Country: Scotland
- Sport: Badminton

Nancy Horner was a Scottish badminton player and prominent badminton official.

Horner was the Vice-President of the Badminton Association of England from 1967 to 1975 and was the only female member on an eighty-strong list at the time. She won 15 caps for Scotland as a player and won every available title in the Scottish Open and the English National Badminton Championships.

A regular competitor in the All England Open Badminton Championships, she reached the quarter-finals in 1950 and won three Scottish Open titles in 1953.
