= Badminton Canada =

Canada's governing body for badminton

- Formation: 1921
- Type: National Sport Association
- Location: Ottawa, Canada
- President: Anil Kaul
- Affiliations: BPA, BWF
- Website: www.badminton.ca

Badminton Canada is the national governing body for the sport of badminton in Canada. The association is composed of 13 member associations representing all of the provinces and territories of Canada.

== History ==
The association was founded as Canadian Badminton Association in 1921 by representatives from badminton clubs across Canada. The next year, the first ever national championships was held in Montreal. It changed its name to Badminton Canada in 1989.

== Tournaments ==
- Canada Open, an open tournament part of BWF Tour Super 300.
- Canadian International
- Canadian National Badminton Championships
- Yonex Canadian International Challenge

== Hall of Fame ==
=== Builders ===
- Pal Chawla
- Bert Fergus
- Jack MacDonald
- Wayne Macdonnell
- Jim Powell
- Dorothy Tinline
- David Waddell

=== Coaches ===
- John Gilbert
- Raphi Kanchanaraphi
- Channarong Ratanaseangsuang
- Abdul Shaikh

=== Officials ===
- Jim Lynch
- Jean-Guy Poitras

=== Players ===
- Claire Backhouse-Sharpe
- Mike Butler
- Wendy Clarkson
- Johanne Falardeau
- Denyse Julien
- Wayne Macdonnell
- Jamie Paulson
- Jack Purcell
- Marjory Shedd
- Jack Underhill

== See also ==
- Canada national badminton team
