= 1957 Uber Cup qualification =

Tournament details
- Dates: 30 August 1956 – 16 March 1957
- Location: Asian zone: Hong Kong; Kuala Lumpur American zone: Kitchener European zone: Belfast; Dublin; Wimbledon

The qualifying process for the 1957 Uber Cup took place from 30 August 1956 to 16 March 1957 to decide the final teams which will play in the final tournament.

== Qualification process ==
The qualification process is divided into four regions, the Asian Zone, the American Zone, the European Zone and the Australasian Zone. Teams in their respective zone will compete in a knockout format. Three singles and four doubles will be played on the day of competition. The teams that win their respective zone will earn a place in the final tournament to be held in England.

=== Qualified teams ===
| Country | Qualified as | Qualified on | Final appearance |
|---|---|---|---|
| India | Asian Zone winners | 22 December 1956 | 1st |
| Denmark | European Zone winners | 19 March 1957 | 1st |
| United States | American Zone winners | 26 March 1957 | 1st |
| New Zealand | Sole representative of the Australasian Zone | 22 March 1956 | 1st |

== Asian Zone ==
=== Bracket ===
Semi-finals
30 August 1956 – Hong Kong
Malaya | 6
Hong Kong | 1
Bye
India

Final
21 December 1956 – Kuala Lumpur
Malaya | 3
India | 4

=== Semi-finals ===
Malaya
6
Hong Kong
30–31 August 1956

Hong Kong
1

| | | | 1 | 2 | 3 |
|---|---|---|---|---|---|
| 1 | (Malaysia) (Hong Kong) | Tan Gaik Bee; Ulian Khoo | 12; 11 | 12; 10 |
| 2 | (Malaysia) (Hong Kong) | Lam Kit Lin; Diana Yung | 11; 4 | 12; 10 |
| 3 | (Malaysia) (Hong Kong) | Dolly Tan; Helen Kwong | 7; 11 | 6; 11 |
| 4 | (Malaysia) (Hong Kong) | Helen Heng / Tan Gaik Bee; Ulian Khoo / Diana Yung | 15; 5 | 17; 16 |
| 5 | (Malaysia) (Hong Kong) | Lam Kit Lin / Cecilia Samuel; Cynder Ho / Helen Kwong | 15; 6 | 15; 1 |
| 6 | (Malaysia) (Hong Kong) | Lam Kit Lin / Cecilia Samuel; Ulian Khoo / Diana Yung | 15; 7 | 15; 3 |
| 7 | (Malaysia) (Hong Kong) | Helen Heng / Tan Gaik Bee; Cynder Ho / Helen Kwong | 15; 8 | 15; 6 |

=== Final ===
India
4
Kuala Lumpur, Malaya
21–22 December 1956

Malaya
3

| | | | 1 | 2 | 3 |
|---|---|---|---|---|---|
| 1 | (India) (Malaysia) | Mumtaj Lotwalla; Tan Gaik Bee | 11; 8 | 11; 8 |
| 2 | (India) (Malaysia) | Shashi Bhatt; Cecilia Samuel | 2; 11 | 1; 11 |
| 3 | (India) (Malaysia) | Prem Prashar; Lam Kit Lin | 10; 12 | 11; 8 | 8; 11 |
| 4 | (India) (Malaysia) | Suman Athavale / Mumtaj Lotwalla; Helen Heng / Tan Gaik Bee | 15; 12 | 15; 6 |
| 5 | (India) (Malaysia) | Sushila Kapadia / Prem Prashar; Lam Kit Lin / Cecilia Samuel | 2; 15 | 12; 15 |
| 6 | (India) (Malaysia) | Sushila Kapadia / Prem Prashar; Helen Heng / Tan Gaik Bee | 15; 6 | 15; 7 |
| 7 | (India) (Malaysia) | Suman Athavale / Mumtaj Lotwalla; Lam Kit Lin / Cecilia Samuel | 17; 15 | 15; 9 |

== American Zone ==
=== Bracket ===
| Final |
| 25 February 1957 – Kitchener |
| United States | 7 |
| Canada | 0 |

=== Final ===
United States
7
Kitchener, Canada
25–26 February 1957

Canada
0

| | | | 1 | 2 | 3 |
|---|---|---|---|---|---|
| 1 | (United States) (Canada) | Judy Devlin; Aveleigh Hepworth | 11; 3 | 11; 0 |
| 2 | (United States) (Canada) | Margaret Varner; Marjory Shedd | 11; 3 | 11; 3 |
| 3 | (United States) (Canada) | Lois Alston; Kay Grant | 11; 4 | 9; 11 | 11; 1 |
| 4 | (United States) (Canada) | Ethel Marshall / Bea Massman; Claire Lovett / Joan Warren | 18; 16 | 15; 3 |
| 5 | (United States) (Canada) | Judy Devlin / Susan Devlin; Joan Hennessy / Marjory Shedd | 15; 7 | 15; 11 |
| 6 | (United States) (Canada) | Judy Devlin / Susan Devlin; Claire Lovett / Joan Warren | 15; 1 | 15; 7 |
| 7 | (United States) (Canada) | Ethel Marshall / Bea Massman; Joan Hennessy / Marjory Shedd | 15; 1 | 15; 11 |

== European Zone ==
=== Bracket ===
First round
Denmark
Bye
England
Bye
17 November 1956 – Dublin
Ireland | 6
Sweden | 1
Scotland
Bye

Semi-finals
4 January 1957 – Wimbledon
Denmark | 5
England | 2
16 January 1957 – Belfast
Ireland | 5
Scotland | 2

Final
15 March 1957 – Dublin
Denmark | 6
Ireland | 1

=== First round ===
Ireland
6
Dublin, Ireland
17–18 November 1956

Sweden
1

| | | | 1 | 2 | 3 |
|---|---|---|---|---|---|
| 1 | (Republic of Ireland) (Sweden) | Yvonne Kelly; Berit Olsson | 5; 11 | 10; 12 |
| 2 | (Republic of Ireland) (Sweden) | Mary O'Sullivan; Ulla-Britt Lagerström | 11; 5 | 12; 9 |
| 3 | (Republic of Ireland) (Sweden) | Sheila Smyth; Inger Nilsson | 11; 5 | 11; 4 |
| 4 | (Republic of Ireland) (Sweden) | Jean Lawless / Sheila Smyth; Ingrid Dahlberg / Berit Olsson | 15; 11 | 15; 7 |
| 5 | (Republic of Ireland) (Sweden) | Yvonne Kelly / Mary O'Sullivan; Ulla-Britt Lagerström / Inger Nilsson | 15; 1 | 15; 1 |
| 6 | (Republic of Ireland) (Sweden) | Yvonne Kelly / Mary O'Sullivan; Ingrid Dahlberg / Berit Olsson | 17; 15 | 13; 18 | 15; 5 |
| 7 | (Republic of Ireland) (Sweden) | Jean Lawless / Sheila Smyth; Ulla-Britt Lagerström / Inger Nilsson | 15; 7 | 15; 4 |

=== Semi-finals ===
Ireland
5
Belfast, Northern Ireland
4–5 January 1957

Scotland
2

| | | | 1 | 2 | 3 |
|---|---|---|---|---|---|
| 1 | (Republic of Ireland) (Scotland) | Yvonne Kelly; Wilma Tyre | 11; 6 | 12; 9 |
| 2 | (Republic of Ireland) (Scotland) | Mary O'Sullivan; Catherine Dunglison | 11; 2 | 12; 4 |
| 3 | (Republic of Ireland) (Scotland) | Sheila Smyth; Gladys Massie | 11; 5 | 4; 11 | 11; 6 |
| 4 | (Republic of Ireland) (Scotland) | Jean Lawless / Sheila Smyth; Isobel Montgomerie / Wilma Tyre | 15; 5 | 11; 15 | 13; 15 |
| 5 | (Republic of Ireland) (Scotland) | Yvonne Kelly / Mary O'Sullivan; Catherine Dunglison / Marjory Russell | 15; 4 | 12; 15 | 15; 9 |
| 6 | (Republic of Ireland) (Scotland) | Yvonne Kelly / Mary O'Sullivan; Isobel Montgomerie / Wilma Tyre | 7; 15 | 9; 15 |
| 7 | (Republic of Ireland) (Scotland) | Jean Lawless / Sheila Smyth; Catherine Dunglison / Marjory Russell | 8; 15 | 15; 12 | 15; 6 |

Denmark
5
Wimbledon, England
16–17 January 1957

England
2

| | | | 1 | 2 | 3 |
|---|---|---|---|---|---|
| 1 | (Denmark) (England) | Aase Schiøtt Jacobsen; Heather Ward | 10; 12 | 8; 11 |
| 2 | (Denmark) (England) | Tonny Petersen; Iris Rogers | 3; 11 | 11; 7 | 11; 4 |
| 3 | (Denmark) (England) | Tonny Ahm; June Timperley | 12; 10 | 11; 0 |
| 4 | (Denmark) (England) | Aase Schiøtt Jacobsen / Birte Kristiansen; Barbara Carpenter / Heather Ward | 12; 15 | 15; 12 | 18; 15 |
| 5 | (Denmark) (England) | Kirsten Granlund / Anni Hammergaard Hansen; Iris Rogers / June Timperley | 15; 9 | 15; 11 |
| 6 | (Denmark) (England) | Kirsten Granlund / Anni Hammergaard Hansen; Barbara Carpenter / Heather Ward | 10; 15 | 15; 7 | 15; 6 |
| 7 | (Denmark) (England) | Aase Schiøtt Jacobsen / Birte Kristiansen; Iris Rogers / June Timperley | 6; 15 | 13; 18 |

=== Final ===
Denmark
6
Dublin, Ireland
15–16 March 1957

Ireland
1

| | | | 1 | 2 | 3 |
|---|---|---|---|---|---|
| 1 | (Denmark) (Republic of Ireland) | Tonny Ahm; Yvonne Kelly | 12; 10 | 11; 8 |
| 2 | (Denmark) (Republic of Ireland) | Aase Schiøtt Jacobsen; Mary O'Sullivan | 2; 11 | 6; 11 |
| 3 | (Denmark) (Republic of Ireland) | Tonny Petersen; Sheila Smyth | 11; 5 | 11; 1 |
| 4 | (Denmark) (Republic of Ireland) | Aase Schiøtt Jacobsen / Birte Kristiansen; Jean Lawless / Sheila Smyth | 14; 17 | 15; 9 | 15; 7 |
| 5 | (Denmark) (Republic of Ireland) | Kirsten Granlund / Anni Hammergaard Hansen; Yvonne Kelly / Mary O'Sullivan | 15; 7 | 15; 6 |
| 6 | (Denmark) (Republic of Ireland) | Kirsten Granlund / Anni Hammergaard Hansen; Jean Lawless / Sheila Smyth | 12; 15 | 15; 3 | 15; 5 |
| 7 | (Denmark) (Republic of Ireland) | Aase Schiøtt Jacobsen / Birte Kristiansen; Yvonne Kelly / Mary O'Sullivan | 8; 15 | 15; 10 | 15; 3 |

== Australasian Zone ==
=== Bracket ===
| Final |
| New Zealand | w/o |
| Australia |

In the Australasian zone qualifiers, New Zealand automatically qualified for the final tournament after the Australian team announced their withdrawal from the competition.
