= Canada Open =

Annual badminton tournament held in Canada

- Official website
- Founded: 1957; 69 years ago
- Editions: 61 (2026)
- Location: Markham (2026); Canada
- Venue: Markham Pan Am Centre (2026)
- Prize money: US$250,000 (2026)

Men's
- Draw: 32S / 32D
- Current champions: Yudai Okimoto (singles); Hiroki Okamura; Kyohei Yamashita (doubles)
- Most singles titles: 3 Erland Kops
- Most doubles titles: 5 Ray Stevens

Women's
- Draw: 32S / 32D
- Current champions: Riko Gunji (singles); Hinata Suzuki; Nao Yamakita (doubles)
- Most singles titles: 4 Marjory Shedd; Michelle Li
- Most doubles titles: 5 Marjory Shedd

Mixed doubles
- Draw: 32
- Current champions: Akira Koga; Natsu Saito
- Most titles (male): 2 Finn Kobberø; Ng Boon Bee; Billy Gilliland; Thomas Lund; Kristian Roebuck; Lee Chun Hei
- Most titles (female): 3 Nora Perry; Gillian Gowers

Super 300
- Canada Open; German Open; Korea Masters; Macau Open; New Zealand Open; Orléans Masters; Spain Masters; Swiss Open; Syed Modi International; Taipei Open; Thailand Masters; U.S. Open

Last completed
- 2026 Canada Open

The Canada Open (French: Open du Canada) is an annual international badminton tournament held in Canada since 1957.

In 1957, the Canadian Badminton Federation opened the Canadian National Championships to international competitors, combining the event with the inaugural Canada Open. The two events were held concurrently until 1961, before being separated into distinct tournaments in 1962. The 2008 and 2009 editions were held as the Canadian International.

The Canada Open was upgraded to a BWF World Tour Super 500 event in 2023. However, on 19 March 2025, the Badminton World Federation (BWF) demoted the tournament to the Super 300 level for the 2025 and 2026 seasons.

Only two nations have ever achieved a clean sweep of all five titles in a single edition of the tournament: England accomplished the feat in 2004, and Japan repeated it in 2026.

== History of host cities ==
City	Years host
Richmond	2012–2013
Vancouver	2014
Calgary	2015–2019, 2022–2024
Markham	2025–2026

Locations of Canada Open host cities

== Previous winners ==
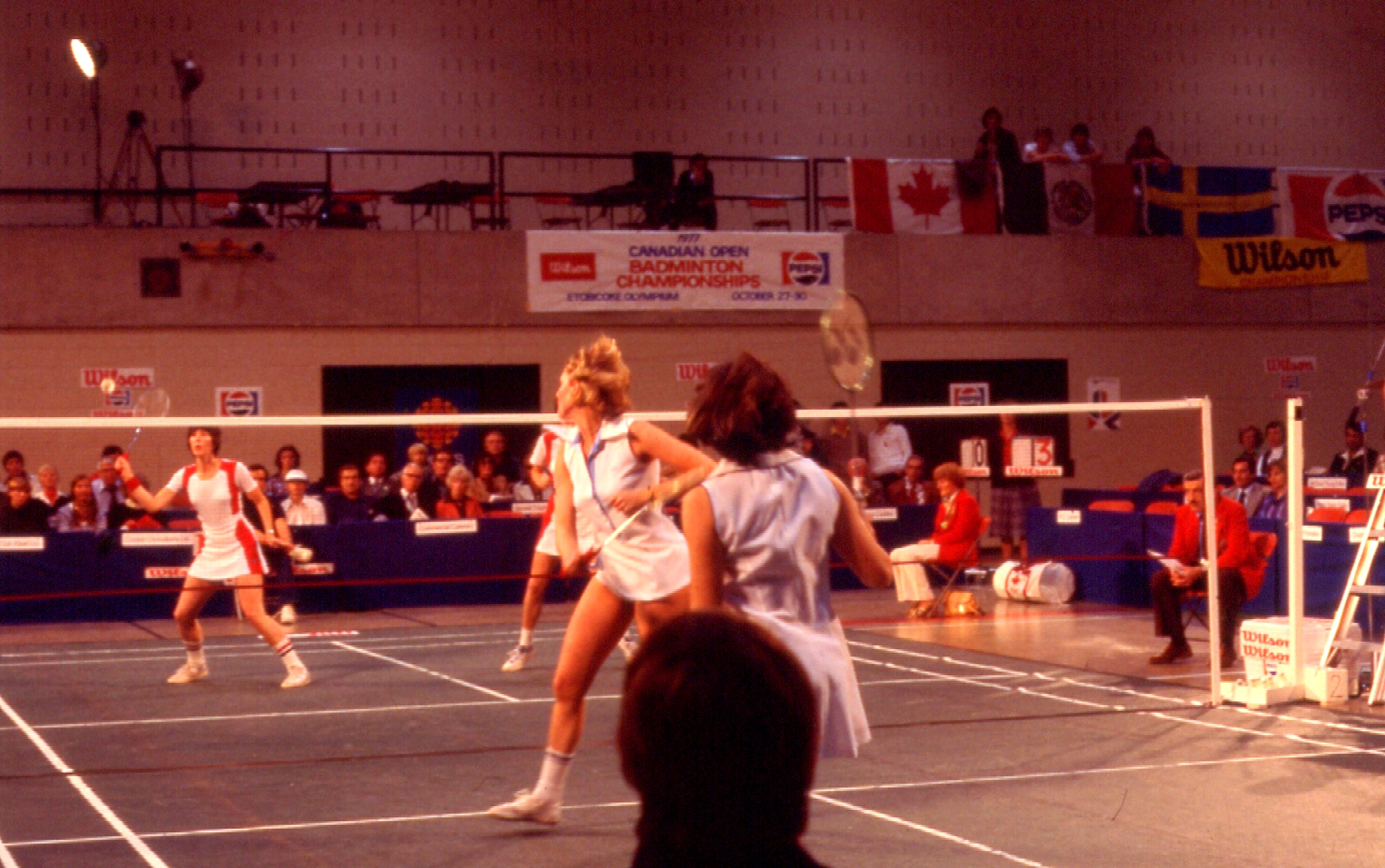
Nora Perry and Karena Puttick against Barbara Sutton and Jane Webster during the final of the 1977 Canadian Open.

=== Canada National Championships and Canada Open together ===
Year	Men's singles	Women's singles	Men's doubles	Women's doubles	Mixed doubles
1957	(Canada) David Fraser McTaggart	(United States) Judy Devlin	(Canada) Don K. Smythe (Canada) H. "Budd" Porter	(United States) Sue Devlin (United States) Judy Devlin	(United States) Bob Williams (United States) Ethel Marshall
1958	(Canada) David Fraser McTaggart	(Canada) Jean Miller	(Canada) Don K. Smythe (Canada) H. "Budd" Porter	(Canada) Marjorie Shedd (Canada) Joan Hennessy	(Canada) William Purcell (Canada) Marjorie Shedd
1959	(Indonesia) Tan Joe Hok	(United States) Judy Devlin	(Malaysia) Lim Say Hup (Malaysia) Teh Kew San	(United States) Sue Devlin (United States) Judy Devlin	(United States) Don P. Davis (United States) Judy Devlin
1960	(Indonesia) Tan Joe Hok	(Canada) Marjorie Shedd	(Malaysia) Lim Say Hup (Malaysia) Teh Kew San	(United States) Lois Alston (United States) Beulah Armendariz	(Denmark) Finn Kobberø (Canada) Jean Miller
1961	(Denmark) Erland Kops	(Canada) Marjorie Shedd	(Denmark) Finn Kobberø (Denmark) Jörgen Hammergaard Hansen	(Canada) Marjorie Shedd (Canada) Dorothy Tinline	(Denmark) Finn Kobberø (Canada) Jean Miller

=== Canadian Open ===
Year	Men's singles	Women's singles	Men's doubles	Women's doubles	Mixed doubles
1962	(Indonesia) Ferry Sonneville	(Canada) Marjorie Shedd	(United States) Jim Poole (United States) Bob Williams	(Canada) Marjorie Shedd (Canada) Dorothy Tinline	(Sweden) Berndt Dahlberg (Canada) Dorothy Tinline
1963	(Denmark) Erland Kops	(Canada) Marjorie Shedd	(Denmark) Erland Kops (Scotland) Bob McCoig	(Canada) Marjorie Shedd (Canada) Dorothy Tinline	(Denmark) Erland Kops (Canada) Claire Lovett
1964	(Thailand) Channarong Ratanaseangsuang	(Canada) Jean Miller	(Japan) Eiichi Nagai (Japan) Eiichi Sakai	(Canada) Marjorie Shedd (Canada) Dorothy Tinline	(Canada) James Carnwath (Canada) Marjorie Shedd
1965	(Thailand) Channarong Ratanaseangsuang	(Canada) Jean Miller	(United States) Jim Poole (Thailand) Channarong Ratanaseangsuang	(United States) Tyna Barinaga (United States) Caroline Jensen	(Scotland) Bob McCoig (England) Margaret Barrand
1966	(Malaysia) Tan Aik Huang	(United States) Judy Hashman	(Malaysia) Ng Boon Bee (Malaysia) Tan Yee Khan	(United States) Judy Hashman (Republic of Ireland) Susan Peard	(Malaysia) Ng Boon Bee (Denmark) Ulla Strand
1967	(Denmark) Erland Kops	(Canada) Alison Daysmith	(England) Roger Mills (England) Colin Beacom	(Canada) Patricia Moody (Canada) Jean Miller	(England) Roger Mills (Canada) Sharon Whittaker
1968	(Canada) Bruce Rollick	(Canada) Sharon Whittaker	(Thailand) Sangob Rattanusorn (Thailand) Chavalert Chumkum	(Canada) Sharon Whittaker (Canada) Mimi Nilsson	(Thailand) Sangob Rattanusorn (United States) Lois Alston
1969	(Indonesia) Rudy Hartono	(Sweden) Eva Twedberg	(England) Tony Jordan (Scotland) Bob McCoig	(Indonesia) Retno Kustijah (Indonesia) Minarni	(Indonesia) Darmadi (Indonesia) Minarni
1970	(Japan) Ippei Kojima	(United States) Tyna Barinaga	(Canada) Raphi Kanchanaraphi (Canada) Channarong Ratanaseangsuang	(England) Susan Whetnall (England) Margaret Boxall	(Japan) Ippei Kojima (England) Susan Whetnall
1971	(Indonesia) Rudy Hartono	(Japan) Hiroe Yuki	(Malaysia) Ng Boon Bee (Malaysia) Punch Gunalan	(Japan) Noriko Takagi (Japan) Hiroe Yuki	(Malaysia) Ng Boon Bee (Malaysia) Sylvia Ng
1972	(England) Derek Talbot	(Sweden) Eva Twedberg	(England) Mike Tredgett (England) Ray Stevens	(Denmark) Anne Berglund (Denmark) Pernille Kaagard	(Denmark) Flemming Delfs (Denmark) Pernille Kaagard
1973	(Canada) Jamie Paulson	(Canada) Nancy McKinley	(Canada) Jamie Paulson (Canada) Yves Pare	(England) Margaret Beck (Netherlands) Joke van Beusekom	No competition
1974	(Canada) Jamie Paulson	(Canada) Jane Youngberg	(Japan) Shoichi Toganoo (Japan) Nobutaka Ikeda	(Canada) Jane Youngberg (Canada) Barbara Welch	(Canada) Raphi Kanchanaraphi (Canada) Barbara Welch
1975	(England) Ray Stevens	(England) Margaret Beck	(England) Mike Tredgett (England) Ray Stevens	(England) Margaret Beck (Netherlands) Joke van Beusekom	No competition
1976	(Thailand) Bandid Jaiyen	(Canada) Wendy Clarkson	(England) Mike Tredgett (England) Ray Stevens	(England) Margaret Lockwood (England) Nora Gardner	No competition
1977	(Denmark) Flemming Delfs	(Canada) Wendy Clarkson	(Sweden) Thomas Kihlström (Sweden) Bengt Fröman	(England) Nora Perry (England) Karen Puttick	(England) David Eddy (England) Nora Perry
1978	(Denmark) Flemming Delfs	(Canada) Wendy Clarkson	(Sweden) Thomas Kihlström (Sweden) Bengt Fröman	(Japan) Sonoe Ohtsuka (Japan) Kazuk Sekine	(Denmark) Steen Skovgaard (Canada) Wendy Clarkson
1979	(Denmark) Morten Frost	(Japan) Fumiko Tookairin	(Indonesia) Christian Hadinata (Indonesia) Ade Chandra	(Indonesia) Imelda Wiguna (Indonesia) Verawaty Wiharjo	(Indonesia) Christian Hadinata (Indonesia) Imelda Wiguna
1980	(Denmark) Morten Frost	(England) Gillian Gilks	(England) Mike Tredgett (England) Ray Stevens	(England) Nora Perry (England) Jane Webster	(England) Mike Tredgett (England) Nora Perry
1981	(England) Nick Yates	(China) Sam Yanquin	(Sweden) Thomas Kihlström (England) Ray Stevens	(England) Nora Perry (England) Jane Webster	(Sweden) Thomas Kihlström (England) Gillian Gilks
1982	(Sweden) Torbjörn Peterson	(England) Sally Podger	(Sweden) Torbjörn Peterson (Sweden) Lars Wengberg	(England) Gillian Gilks (England) Gillian Clark	(Scotland) Billy Gilliland (Scotland) Karen Chapman
1983	(Malaysia) Misbun Sidek	(Denmark) Kenneth Larsen	(Malaysia) Rashid Sidek (Malaysia) Misbun Sidek	(England) Sally Podger (England) Karen Beckman	(Canada) Mike Butler (Canada) Claire Backhouse
1984	(Denmark) Michael Kjeldsen	(China) Chen Hong	(Malaysia) Razif Sidek (Malaysia) Misbun Sidek	(England) Gillian Gowers (England) Karen Chapman	(England) Nigel Tier (England) Gillian Gowers
1985	(Denmark) Jens Peter Nierhoff	(Canada) Claire Backhouse-Sharpe	(Denmark) Jens Peter Nierhoff (Denmark) Henrik Svarrer	(Canada) Johanne Falardeau (Canada) Denyse Julien	(Scotland) Billy Gilliland (England) Nora Perry
1986	No competition				
1987	(South Korea) Park Sung-bae	(South Korea) Chun Sung-Suk	(South Korea) Lee Deuk-choon (South Korea) Lee Sang-bok	(South Korea) Kim Jung-Ja (South Korea) Cho Young-Suk	(England) Andy Goode (England) Gillian Gowers
1988	(England) Steve Butler	(China) Zheng Baojun	(Denmark) Jens Peter Nierhoff (Denmark) Henrik Svarrer	(Netherlands) Erica van Dijck (Netherlands) Eline Coene	(Denmark) Henrik Svarrer (Netherlands) Erica van Dijck
1989	(England) Anders Neilson	(Canada) Denyse Julien	(Canada) Bryan Blanshard (Canada) Mike Bitten	(South Korea) Hwa Jung-Eun (South Korea) Joo Shon-hye	(Canada) Mike Bitten (Canada) Doris Piché
1990	(Indonesia) Fung Permadi	(Soviet Union) Vlada Chernyavskaya	(Malaysia) Ong Ewe Chye (Malaysia) Rahman Sidek	(Canada) Denyse Julien (Canada) Doris Piché	(Canada) Bryan Blanshard (Canada) Denyse Julien
1991	(England) Steve Butler	(Soviet Union) Elena Rybkina	(Malaysia) Jalani Sidek (Malaysia) Razif Sidek	(England) Gillian Gowers (England) Sara Sankey	(England) Nick Ponting (England) Gillian Gowers
1992	(South Korea) Ahn Jae-chang	(Japan) Hisako Mizui	(Malaysia) Cheah Soon Kit (Malaysia) Soo Beng Kiang	(Denmark) Pernille Dupont (Denmark) Lotte Olsen	(Denmark) Thomas Lund (Denmark) Pernille Dupont
1993	(Denmark) Thomas Stuer-Lauridsen	(Denmark) Camilla Martin	(Denmark) Thomas Lund (Denmark) Jon Holst-Christensen	(Denmark) Pernille Dupont (Denmark) Lotte Olsen	(Denmark) Thomas Lund (Denmark) Pernille Dupont
1994	(Indonesia) Lioe Tiong Ping	(Denmark) Pernille Nedergaard	(Indonesia) Ade Sutrisna (Indonesia) Candra Wijaya	(Denmark) Rikke Olsen (Denmark) Helene Kirkegaard	(Austria) Jürgen Koch (Austria) Irina Serova
1995	(South Korea) Lee Gwang-jin	(South Korea) Bang Soo-hyun	(South Korea) Ha Tae-kwon (South Korea) Kang Kyung-jin	(South Korea) Gil Young-ah (South Korea) Jang Hye-ock	(South Korea) Kim Dong-moon (South Korea) Gil Young-ah
1996– 1998	No competition				
1999	(Canada) Brian Abra	(Canada) Charmaine Reid	(Canada) Wang Wen (Canada) Darryl Yung	(Canada) Robbyn Hermitage (Canada) Milaine Cloutier	(Canada) Iain Sydie (Canada) Denyse Julien
2000	(Finland) Jyri Aalto	(Japan) Takako Ida	(Hong Kong) Ma Che Kong (Hong Kong) Yau Tsz Yuk	(England) Joanne Davies (England) Sara Hardaker	(Australia) Peter Blackburn (Australia) Rhonda Cator
2001	No competition				
2002	(England) Colin Haughton	(Germany) Petra Overzier	(Canada) Brian Prevoe (Canada) Philippe Bourett	(England) Liza Parker (England) Suzanne Rayappan	(England) Kristian Roebuck (England) Natalie Munt
2003	(South Korea) Hong Seung-ki	(South Korea) Lee Eun-woo	(South Korea) Hwang Ji-man (South Korea) Jung Hoong-min	(South Korea) Lee Eun-woo (South Korea) Ha Jung-eun	(South Korea) Hwang Ji-man (South Korea) Lee Eun-woo
2004	(England) Aamir Ghaffar	(England) Julia Mann	(England) Paul Trueman (England) Ian Palethorpe	(England) Liza Parker (England) Suzanne Rayappan	(England) Kristian Roebuck (England) Liza Parker
2005	(Canada) Hariawan	(South Korea) Lee Yun-hwa	(South Korea) Han Sung-wook (South Korea) Kang Kyung-jin	(South Korea) Jun Woul-sik (South Korea) Ra Kyung-min	(South Korea) Kang Kyung-jin (South Korea) Ha Jung-eun
2006	(England) Toby Honey	(United States) Eva Lee	(Canada) William Milroy (Canada) Mike Beres	(United States) Mesinee Mangkalakiri (United States) Eva Lee	(United States) Howard Bach (United States) Eva Lee
2007	(Malaysia) Lee Tsuen Seng	(South Korea) Lee Yun-hwa	(Canada) William Milroy (Canada) Mike Beres	(South Korea) Hwang Yu-mi (South Korea) Ha Jung-eun	(Canada) William Milroy (Canada) Tammy Sun
2008– 2009	No competition				
2010	(Indonesia) Taufik Hidayat	(China) Zhu Lin	(Chinese Taipei) Fang Chieh-min (Chinese Taipei) Lee Sheng-mu	(Chinese Taipei) Chien Yu-chin (Chinese Taipei) Cheng Wen-hsing	(Chinese Taipei) Lee Sheng-mu (Chinese Taipei) Cheng Wen-hsing
2011	(Germany) Marc Zwiebler	(Chinese Taipei) Cheng Shao-chieh	(South Korea) Ko Sung-hyun (South Korea) Lee Yong-dae	(China) Cheng Shu (China) Bao Yixin	(Germany) Michael Fuchs (Germany) Birgit Michels
2012	(Chinese Taipei) Chou Tien-chen	(Japan) Nozomi Okuhara	(Japan) Takeshi Kamura (Japan) Keigo Sonoda	(Japan) Misaki Matsutomo (Japan) Ayaka Takahashi	(Japan) Ryota Taohata (Japan) Ayaka Takahashi
2013	(Malaysia) Tan Chun Seang	(Thailand) Nichaon Jindapon	(Thailand) Maneepong Jongjit (Thailand) Nipitphon Puangpuapech	(China) Huang Yaqiong (China) Yu Xiaohan	(Hong Kong) Lee Chun Hei (Hong Kong) Chau Hoi Wah
2014	(South Korea) Lee Hyun-il	(Canada) Michelle Li	(Chinese Taipei) Liang Jui-wei (Chinese Taipei) Lu Chia-bin	(South Korea) Choi Hye-in (South Korea) Lee So-hee	(Germany) Max Schwenger (Germany) Carla Nelte
2015	(Malaysia) Lee Chong Wei	(Canada) Michelle Li	(China) Li Junhui (China) Liu Yuchen	(India) Jwala Gutta (India) Ashwini Ponnappa	(Hong Kong) Lee Chun Hei (Hong Kong) Chau Hoi Wah
2016	(India) B. Sai Praneeth	(Canada) Michelle Li	(India) Manu Attri (India) B. Sumeeth Reddy	(Australia) Setyana Mapasa (Australia) Gronya Somerville	(Vietnam) Do Tuan Duc (Vietnam) Pham Nhu Thao
2017	(Japan) Kanta Tsuneyama	(Japan) Saena Kawakami	(England) Peter Briggs (England) Tom Wolfenden	(Japan) Mayu Matsumoto (Japan) Wakana Nagahara	(South Korea) Kim Won-ho (South Korea) Shin Seung-chan
2018	(China) Lu Guangzu	(China) Li Xuerui	(England) Marcus Ellis (England) Chris Langridge	(Japan) Ayako Sakuramoto (Japan) Yukiko Takahata	(England) Marcus Ellis (England) Lauren Smith
2019	(China) Li Shifeng	(South Korea) An Se-young	(Denmark) Mathias Boe (Denmark) Mads Conrad-Petersen	(Australia) Setyana Mapasa (Australia) Gronya Somerville	(South Korea) Ko Sung-hyun (South Korea) Eom Hye-won
2020	Cancelled (Note: This tournament, originally to be played from 30 June to 5 July, was later cancelled due to the COVID-19 pandemic in Canada.)				
2021	Cancelled (Note: This tournament, originally to be played from 29 June to 4 July, was later cancelled due to the COVID-19 pandemic in Canada.)				
2022	(France) Alex Lanier	(Canada) Michelle Li	(Japan) Ayato Endo (Japan) Yuta Takei	(Japan) Rena Miyaura (Japan) Ayako Sakuramoto	(Chinese Taipei) Ye Hong-wei (Chinese Taipei) Lee Chia-hsin
2023	(India) Lakshya Sen	(Japan) Akane Yamaguchi	(Denmark) Kim Astrup (Denmark) Anders Skaarup Rasmussen	(Japan) Nami Matsuyama (Japan) Chiharu Shida	(Japan) Hiroki Midorikawa (Japan) Natsu Saito
2024	(Japan) Koki Watanabe	(Thailand) Busanan Ongbamrungphan	(Denmark) Kim Astrup (Denmark) Anders Skaarup Rasmussen	(Japan) Rin Iwanaga (Japan) Kie Nakanishi	(Denmark) Jesper Toft (Denmark) Amalie Magelund
2025	(Japan) Kenta Nishimoto	(Japan) Manami Suizu	(Chinese Taipei) Lee Fang-chih (Chinese Taipei) Lee Fang-jen	(Thailand) Benyapa Aimsaard (Thailand) Nuntakarn Aimsaard	(Thailand) Ruttanapak Oupthong (Thailand) Jhenicha Sudjaipraparat
2026	(Japan) Yudai Okimoto	(Japan) Riko Gunji	(Japan) Hiroki Okamura (Japan) Kyohei Yamashita	(Japan) Hinata Suzuki (Japan) Nao Yamakita	(Japan) Akira Koga (Japan) Natsu Saito

== Performances by nation ==
As of the 2026 edition

Pos	Nation	MS	WS	MD	WD	XD	Total
1	Canada*	7	22	9	11	11	60
2	England	9	4	9	13	11.5	46.5
3	Japan	5	9	5	9	3.5	31.5
4	Denmark	10	3	7.5	4	6	30.5
5	South Korea	5	6	5	7	5	28
6	Malaysia	5		9		1.5	15.5
6	United States		5	1.5	5.5	3.5	15.5
8	Indonesia	8		2	2	2	14
9	Thailand	3	2	2.5	1	1.5	10
10	China	2	4	1	2		9
11	Chinese Taipei	1	1	3	1	2	8
12	Sweden	1	2	3.5		1	7.5
13	Germany	1	1			2	4
13	India	2		1	1		4
15	Australia				2	1	3
15	Hong Kong			1		2	3
15	Scotland			1		2	3
18	Netherlands				2	0.5	2.5
19	Soviet Union		2				2
20	Austria					1	1
20	Finland	1					1
20	France	1					1
20	Vietnam					1	1
24	Ireland				0.5		0.5
Total		61	61	61	61	58	302

* Host nation
