= Claire Lovett =

Canadian badminton player (1910–2005)

Personal information
- Born: Claire Ehman; 1910 Regina, Saskatchewan, Canada
- Died: November 26, 2006 (aged 95) Vancouver, British Columbia, Canada

Sport
- Sport: Badminton

Claire Lovett (née Ehman; 1910 – 26 November 2005) was a Canadian badminton and tennis player who competed from the 1940s to 1990s. As a badminton player, she won singles and doubles titles at the Canadian National Badminton Championships from 1947 to 1949. She later won at the mixed doubles event during the 1963 Canadian Open. Apart from badminton, she won 16 Vancouver Lawn Tennis Club championships between 1946 and 1967. She was inducted into the Canadian Olympic Hall of Fame in 1972 and BC Sports Hall of Fame in 1975.

== Early life ==
Lovett was born in Regina, Saskatchewan. She began playing basketball during the Great Depression of the 1930s with the Edmonton Grads.

== Career ==
Lovett started her badminton career at the Wascana Country Club in Regina before moving to Vancouver, British Columbia, in the 1940s. Her national title wins were from 1947 to 1949 at the Canadian National Badminton Championships, where she won the singles division from 1947 to 1948 and the doubles title in 1947 and 1949. In international events, Lovett played at the 1957 Uber Cup and was one of the mixed doubles winners at the 1963 Canadian Open. When Lovett continued to play badminton from the 1970s to 1990s, she won championships in the seniors and masters division, which included multiple doubles and mixed doubles masters titles held by Badminton Canada.

Outside of badminton, Lovett was a tennis player during her badminton career and won her first tennis championship at a 1934 Regina event. After she had moved to Vancouver, Lovett held sixteen Vancouver Lawn Tennis Club championships between 1946 and 1967. During this time period, she won the 1952 Western Canada Grass Court Championships in mixed doubles and the 1966 Canadian Senior Ladies Tennis championship in singles competition.

== Awards and honors ==
Lovett was inducted into the Canadian Olympic Hall of Fame in 1972. In provincial hall of fames, she was named to the BC Sports Hall of Fame in 1975 and the Saskatchewan Sports Hall of Fame in 1977.

== Death ==
Lovett died on 26 November 2005 in Vancouver.
