= 1957 Uber Cup knockout stage =

Badminton tournament

The knockout stage for the 1957 Uber Cup began on 13 March 1957 with the semi-finals and ended on 18 March with the final tie. New Zealand, the sole representative of the Australasian zone, withdrew from the final tournament, thus giving Denmark a bye in the semi-finals.

== Qualified teams ==
The teams that won their zonal tie qualified for the final knockout stage.

Group	Winners
A	India
B	United States
C	Denmark
D	New Zealand

== Bracket ==
Semi-finals
13 March 1957 – Eastbourne
United States	7
India	0
New Zealand
Denmark	w/o

Final
18 March 1957 – Lytham St Annes
United States	6
Denmark	1

== Semi-finals ==
=== United States vs India ===
United States
7
Eastbourne, England
13 March 1957

India
0

			1	2	3
1	(United States) (India)	Judy Devlin; Mumtaj Lotwalla	11; 0	11; 5
2	(United States) (India)	Margaret Varner; Sushila Kapadia	11; 2	11; 4
3	(United States) (India)	Lois Alston; Prem Prashar	11; 12	11; 1	11; 6
4	(United States) (India)	Ethel Marshall / Bea Massman; Sushila Kapadia / Prem Prashar	15; 0	15; 8
5	(United States) (India)	Judy Devlin / Susan Devlin; Suman Athavale / Mumtaj Lotwalla	15; 8	15; 11
6	(United States) (India)	Ethel Marshall / Bea Massman; Suman Athavale / Mumtaj Lotwalla	15; 0	15; 8
7	(United States) (India)	Judy Devlin / Susan Devlin; Sushila Kapadia / Prem Prashar	15; 2	15; 4

== Final ==
=== United States vs Denmark ===
United States
6
Lytham St Annes, England
18 March 1957

Denmark
1

			1	2	3
1	(United States) (Denmark)	Judy Devlin; Tonny Ahm	11; 2	11; 8
2	(United States) (Denmark)	Margaret Varner; Aase Schiøtt Jacobsen	11; 7	11; 1
3	(United States) (Denmark)	Lois Alston; Tonny Petersen	8; 11	11; 8	11; 6
4	(United States) (Denmark)	Ethel Marshall / Bea Massman; Aase Schiøtt Jacobsen / Birte Kristiansen	15; 11	15; 11
5	(United States) (Denmark)	Judy Devlin / Susan Devlin; Kirsten Granlund / Anni Hammergaard Hansen	15; 8	15; 4
6	(United States) (Denmark)	Ethel Marshall / Bea Massman; Kirsten Granlund / Anni Hammergaard Hansen	4; 15	9; 15
7	(United States) (Denmark)	Judy Devlin / Susan Devlin; Aase Schiøtt Jacobsen / Birte Kristiansen	15; 4	15; 12
