= PF Flyers =

American lifestyle shoe brand

P.F. Flyers
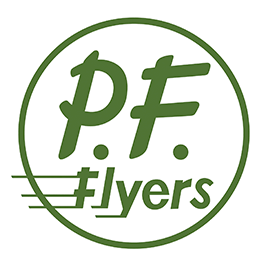
- Type: Subsidiary
- Founded: 1937; 89 years ago in Akron, Ohio, United States
- Founder: B.F. Goodrich
- Headquarters: Allston, Massachusetts, United States
- Area served: Worldwide
- Products: Apparel, clothing, and shoes
- Parent: B.F. Goodrich (1937-1972); Eltra Corporation (1972-1975); Brookfield Athletic Shoe (1975-1988); Saucony (1988-1991); LJO, Inc. (1991-2001); New Balance (2001-2021); Kassia Designs, LLC (2021-present)
- Website: www.pfflyers.com

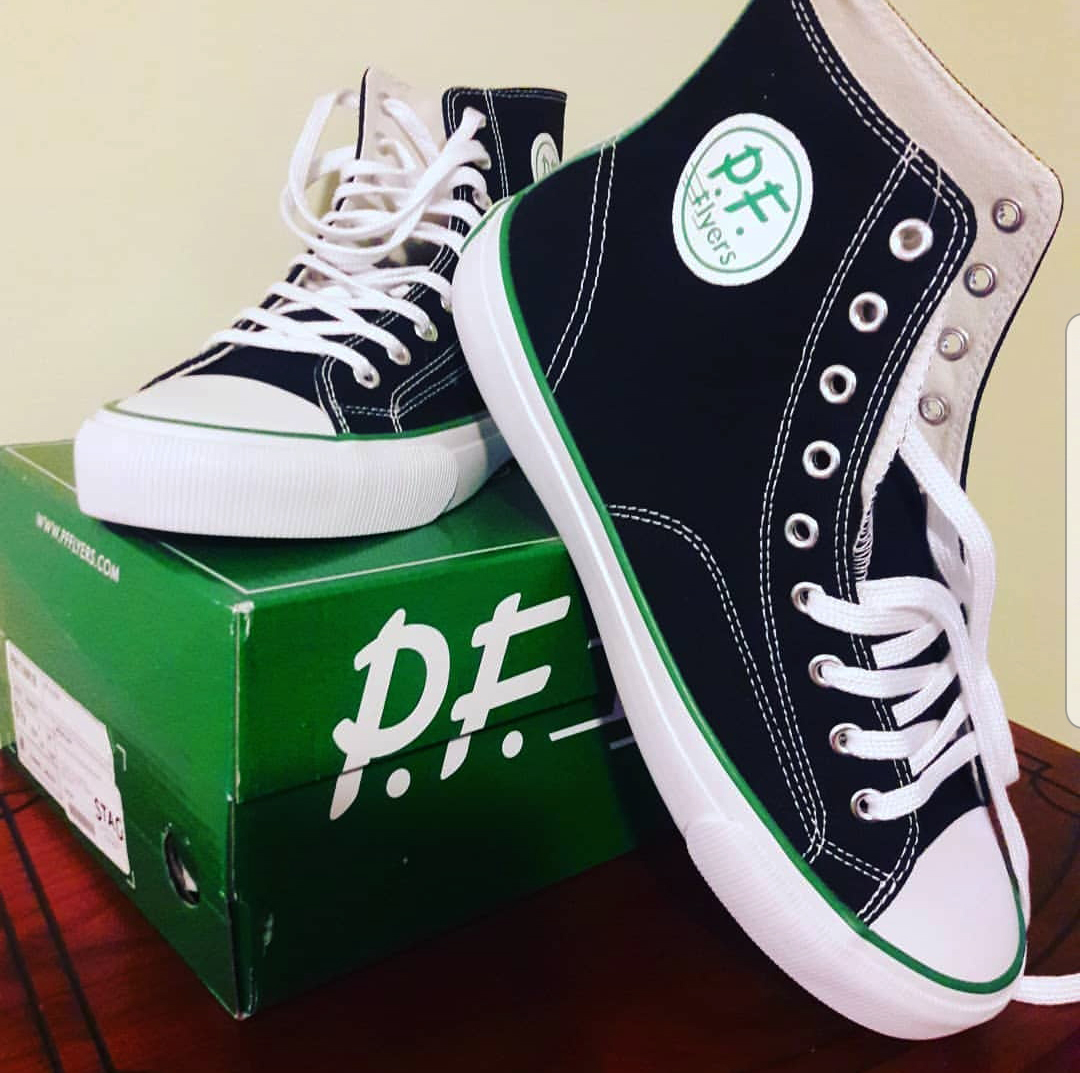
A pair of P.F. Flyers "All American" high tops

P.F. Flyers is an American brand of lifestyle shoes owned by Kassia Designs, LLC. Founded in 1937 by B.F. Goodrich, it is one of the original American sneaker brands.

== History ==
In 1933, inventor Hyman L. Witman and rubber manufacturing company B.F. Goodrich patented the "Posture Foundation" arch support insole, and began adding the new technology to its shoes. B.F. Goodrich shoes with Posture Foundation became known simply as "P.F." in 1937. In 1935, Canadian badminton player Jack Purcell designed a low, white-bleached badminton shoe made of canvas and rubber for B.F. Goodrich. Named after Purcell, it featured a blue "smile" across the toe of the shoe and provided more protection for the court. By 1944, P.F. Flyers released their first kids' collection, and created the slogan, "Run Faster, Jump Higher". Fashion trends in the 1940s and 1950s saw P.F. Flyers expand from gyms and ball fields to become fashionable active footwear; its main competitors were Converse and Keds. "Everything you do is more fun with P.F." read one 1947 magazine ad. P.F. styles ranged from high- and low-top sport shoes to oxfords and moccasins "for work, relaxation and play". P.F. Flyers' women's line was released in 1948. In 1950, P.F. Flyers became standard issue for certain military outfits. 1958 saw the first athlete to be endorsed by a shoe brand: All-star basketball player Bob Cousy of the Boston Celtics was chosen to market P.F. Flyers. P.F. Flyers also sponsored Jonny Quest when it ran from 1964 to 1965. By the 1960s, P.F. was one of the most popular shoes in America, with a 20% hold on all canvas sneakers sold, but struggled with industry changes in the early 1970s.

=== Acquisition ===
In 1972, Eltra Corporation, the former parent of Converse, purchased the P.F. Flyers brand from B.F. Goodrich, because B.F. Goodrich left the shoe industry. However, this created a monopoly in the shoe market and the two brands were split due to an anti-trust lawsuit. Both companies were eventually sold in 1975. P.F. Flyers then fell into obscurity, dormant from 1975 to 2000. The brand was first sold to P&F Industries, Inc, then to the Brookfield Athletic Shoe Company. In 1988, Hyde Athletic Industries Inc. (now known as Saucony), planned to relaunch the P.F. Flyers brand through the acquisition of the Brookfield Athletic Shoe Company Inc., by first marketing the brand for kids before producing adult models. In 1991, LJO Inc. acquired the brand. Despite the split and selling of both companies, Converse kept the rights of the Jack Purcell line of shoes from the P.F. Flyers acquisition. Rebranded with the Converse name, Jack Purcell sneakers are still produced today.

In 2001, New Balance purchased P.F. Flyers and re-launched the brand in 2003. On 23 December 2014, New Balance filed a lawsuit against Nike-owned Converse for its federal trademark registration for the toe bumper, toe cap and striped midsole and had ruled out that, "Converse does not have the exclusive right to use a toe bumper, toe cap and striped midsole in connection with athletic footwear." On 15 July 2016, the United States International Trade Commission ruled in favor of New Balance, saying it could continue to produce P.F. Flyers footwear using the toe caps, toe bumpers, and stripes design. On 12 January 2021, New Balance confirmed that the P.F. Flyers brand had been discontinued.

On 21 July 2021, Kassia Davis, the founder of clothing brand KADA, acquired P.F. Flyers from New Balance, and will be operating under Kassia Designs, LLC.

== Products ==
=== Current models ===
Center

The "Center" line is one of P.F. Flyer's most popular and well-known models. The "Center Hi" was also the same model featured in 1993's The Sandlot. In 2018, a baseball cleat model was introduced in collaboration with New Balance.

Grounder

In the 1940s, P.F. Flyers created a consumer version of their US military boot with the release of the "Grounder". The "Grounder" is similar in design to the "Center" model, but with a more durable out-sole and thicker tread. In 2013, the "Foundation Collection" was released with 'Van Buren' brogue, 'Beeson' chukka and 'Brewster' moc-toe models inspired by the Grounder. In 2023, a water-repellent upper was added as a new feature.

All American

In 1958, P.F. Flyers created the first athletic endorsement, of which was Bob Cousy of the Boston Celtics, to market P.F. Flyers with the "All American" model, which was a basketball shoe similar in design to the Converse Chuck Taylor basketball shoe. A reissue was released in 2009, of the "Bob Cousy Lo" that featured a Gullwing Closure of the top lace grommet. In 2017, New Balance re-released the "All American" model, featuring Fresh Foam used in New Balance's active line of shoes. On June 27, 2022, P.F. Flyers released a limited edition "Bob Cousy Hi Top" to celebrate the 2022 season of the Boston Celtics.

Allston

Named after its new headquarters in Allston, Massachusetts, the "Allston" model was released on March 8, 2023 Inspired by the "All American" model, the "Allston" is a woman-focused design that features a thicker sole and gold hardware.

=== Previous models ===
Jack Purcell

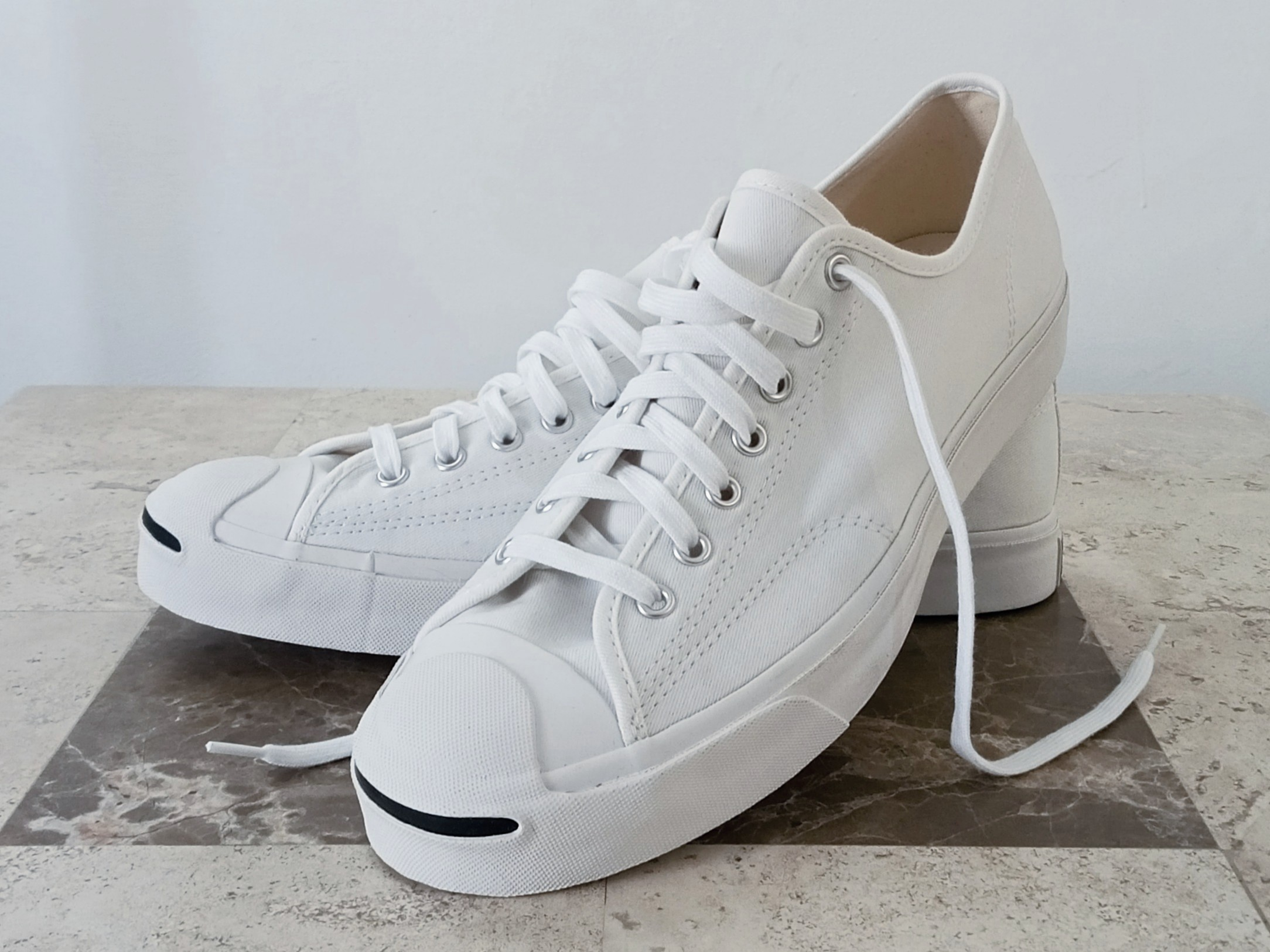
A pair of Jack Purcell sneakers on white canvas.

Originally designed in 1935 by Jack Purcell as a badminton shoe, the "Jack Purcell" was one of P.F. Flyers' first models. In 1972, the "RaceAround" and "Indy 500" shoes were released by B.F. Goodrich and were inspired by fast cars, such as the Corvette. That same year, Converse took ownership of P.F. Flyers until 1975, and kept the rights of the "Jack Purcell" line.

Made in USA

In 2015, P.F. Flyers launched their "Made in USA" collection; handmade in Boston, Massachusetts, to commemorate the 20th-century American-Made P.F. Flyers. Made in USA models include the "Center" and "Windjammer". On December 4, 2020, New Balance stated it will close its Boston plant in February 2021; thus leading to the discontinuation of the P.F. Flyers "Made in USA" collection.

Windjammer

In 1968, P.F. Flyers released the "Windjammer". A CVO-styled sneaker, but with the classic P.F. Flyer design. In 2018, New Balance re-released the "Windjammer" for its "Made in USA" line of footwear.

Rambler

Released in 1943, "Rambler" featured high-visibility hash mark foxing, two-tone stitching, striated toecap, inner webbing stripe, and a pronounced diamond toe bumper. 'Hi' and 'Lo' top versions were available. In 2010, an archival reissue was released.

Sumfum

Originally released in 1947, the "Sumfum" featured an espadrille-styled upper and refined foxing details. An archival reissue was released in 2010.

Glide

In 1979, the "Glide" model was released. It was a basketball high top that featured era-specific markings, padded tongue, and heel ribs. In 2009, an archival reissue of the sneaker was released.

Number 5

Released in 2010, the "Number 5" featured a variety of material make-ups, full-grain leather and woven nylon builds. The signature chevron in the saddle separated this design from other P.F. Flyers models.

== In media ==
P.F. Flyers featured in the 1993 film The Sandlot; for the film's 20th anniversary, a limited edition shoe was made. In 2018, P.F. Flyers created another limited run reissue.

P.F. Flyers appeared in the animated television series Jonny Quest (1964–1965) as the main sponsor of the show. Commercials for Jonny Quest would be centered around advertising P.F. Flyers shoes. One notable highlight of these commercials was the "P.F. Magic Ring", which featured "decoder dials", "magnifying glass", and a "secret compartment" inside the ring and would be included in the purchase of a pair of P.F. Flyers.

P.F. Flyers appeared in the 2026 Backrooms (film), with a pair of P.F. Flyers sunken into the floor of the Backrooms.
