= Charles Kerins =

American painter

- Born: December 7, 1915; Brookline, Massachusetts
- Died: January 1988 (aged 72); Pocasset, Massachusetts

Charles M. Kerins (December 7, 1915 – January 1988) is an American illustrator and painter.

== Education ==
He graduated from the Massachusetts College of Art and Northeastern University. Kerins studied under sculptor Cyrus Dallin who had a profound effect on the artist's attention to anatomy in his paintings.

== Career ==
Kerins chronicled the idealized American dream of the 1950s and 1960s in paintings which appeared as covers for Boston Red Sox Yearbooks, Converse Yearbooks, Catholic Boy magazine and ads in the Saturday Evening Post, Life, Look, and National Geographic magazine. Oil portraits constituted much of his body of work. Portraits include; Wifred L. O'Leary, John F. Kennedy, Richard Cushing, Joseph Martin, Pope John XXIII among others. Kerins' studios were at Scituate, Massachusetts and Pocasset, Massachusetts.

In classical tradition, Kerins worked from live models and used many local people, including a young Mark Goddard of Lost in Space. Working with both Speed Graphic and Polaroid cameras, the artist used photo references as well as life drawings in the creation of his paintings.

Hallmarks of the artist's work are excellent anatomy and dynamic action. Though Kerins style is unique, it is sometimes compared to illustrators Norman Rockwell and Harry Anderson.

== Awards ==
He was named one of America's Top 100 Illustrators by the Chicago Art Directors Club in 1956.

== Family ==
He was twice married. His first wife, Kathryn, mother of his eldest 4 children, was his agent for more than thirty years. Later in life he married Dona and had five more children.
