= Canadian National Badminton Championships =

Badminton tournament in Canada

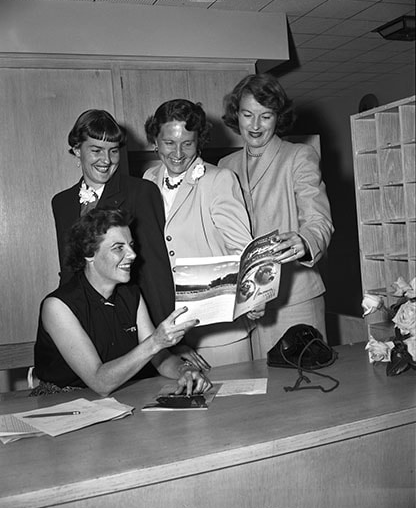
1954 British Empire and Commonwealth Games, Mary Thomasson (seated), with badminton players Anne Munro, Lois Reid and Jean Bardsley (holding programme). Bardsley won 7 titles and Reid won 3 national titles Attribution:Province newspaper

The Canadian National Badminton Championships is a tournament organized to crown the best badminton players in Canada.

The tournament started in 1922. In 1957 the Canadian Badminton Federation decided to open the championships and they were combined with the Canadian Open until 1961. In 1962 they were held separately again.

== Past winners ==
=== Canadian National Championships ===
Year	Men's singles	Women's singles	Men's doubles	Women's doubles	Mixed doubles
1922	Arthur Evans Snell	C. A. Boone	P. C. G. Campbell; H. L. Lafferty	C. A. Boone; R. George	P. C. G. Campbell; Mrs. P. C. G. Campbell
1923	Cowan McTaggart	Marcelle Brunet	Cowan McTaggart; G. H. Gorges	C. A. Boone; R. George	G. H. Gorges; Mrs. W. M. Stewart
1924	H. T. Douglas	Esme F. Coke	Arthur Evans Snell; William M. Stewart	C. A. Boone; Esme F. Coke	William M. Stewart; Mrs. W. M. Stewart
1925	Cowan McTaggart	Esme F. Coke	Cowan McTaggart; Jack Underhill	C. A. Boone; Esme F. Coke	J. Kennedy; Esme F. Coke
1926	C. Walter Aikman	Esme F. Coke	Reginald H. Hill; Jack G. Muir	C. A. Boone; Esme F. Coke	Jack G. Muir; Eileen George
1927	C. Walter Aikman	Eileen George	Jack G. Muir; Jack Underhill	H. Partington; Esme F. Coke	C. Walter Aikman; K. Archibald
1928	Jack Underhill	Esme F. Coke	G. Blackstock; Cyril K. F. Andrews	C. A. Boone; Esme F. Coke	C. Walter Aikman; K. Archibald
1929	Jack Purcell	Esme F. Coke	Jack G. Muir; Noel Radford	V. Mill; Eileen George	Jack Underhill; Eileen George
1930	Jack Purcell	Yvette Porteous	G. Blackstock; Cyril K. F. Andrews	J. Woodman; Eileen George	Jack Underhill; Eileen George
1931	Jack M. Taylor	Ruth Robertson	G. Blackstock; Cyril K. F. Andrews	Marjorie Barrow; Margaret Delage	Jack Underhill; Eileen George
1932	Jack Underhill	Anna Keir	Jack Underhill; Noel Radford	Marjorie Barrow; Margaret Delage	Noel Radford; Anna Keir
1933	Doug Grant	Ruth Robertson	M. Burrows; D. McKean	E. W. Whittington; N. Crossley	George Goodwin Jr. Margaret Robertson
1934	Doug Grant	Anna Patrick	Bev Mitchell; George Goodwin Jr.	Marjorie Barrow; Margaret Delage	Dick Birch; Anna Patrick
1935	Rod G. Phelan	Margaret Taylor	Jack Sibbald; L. Coles	Margaret Robertson; Ruth Robertson	George Goodwin Jr. Margaret Robertson
1936	Doug Grant	Dorothy Walton	E. Laney; Jack Underhill	Margaret Robertson; Ruth Robertson	Dick Birch; Anna Patrick
1937	Dick Birch	Anna Patrick	Jack Sibbald; Joe Zaharko	Anna Patrick; Vess O'Shea	Dick Birch; Anna Patrick
1938	John Samis	Dorothy Walton	Jack Sibbald; Rod G. Phelan	Margaret Taylor; Vess O'Shea	Len Schlemm; N. Bonnar
1939	Dick Birch	Marjorie Delaney	Jack Sibbald; Rod G. Phelan	Margaret Taylor; Vess O'Shea	Dick Birch; Vess O'Shea
1940	Jim Snyder	Dorothy Walton	Jim Snyder; Paul Snyder	Dorothy Walton; Evelyn Effnert	Dick Birch; Vess O'Shea
1941/46	no competition	no competition	no competition	no competition	no competition
1947	John Samis	Claire Lovett	Jack Underhill; John Samis	Claire Lovett; N. Ma	Dick Birch; Barb Ince
1948	Dick Birch	Claire Lovett	Frederick Hughes (Ted) Pollock; Roy G. Smith	M. Armstrong; Edith Marshall	Dick Birch; Ev Roberts
1949	John Samis	Marjorie Mapp	T. Darryl Thompson; K. Meredith	Claire Lovett; Jean Bardsley	T. Darryl Thompson; Jean Bardsley
1950	Alan Williams	Lois Reid	Grant Henry; Dorren Clapperton	Ev Roberts; Joan Hennessy	Dick Birch; Ev Roberts
1951	T. Darryl Thompson	Kay Ottonson	Dick Birch; Gordon Simpson	Lois Reid; Jean Bardsley	T. Darryl Thompson; Jean Bardsley
1952	Donald Smythe	Marjorie Mapp	Donald Smythe; Budd Porter	Barb Ince; Joan Warren	Budd Porter; Edith Marshall
1953	Donald Smythe	Marjory Shedd	Donald Smythe; Budd Porter	Lois Reid; Jean Bardsley	Dick Birch; Barb Ince
1954	Donald Smythe	Marjory Shedd	Donald Smythe; William Purcell	Marjory Shedd; Joan Hennessy	T. Darryl Thompson; Jean Bardsley
1955	Donald Smythe	Jean Waring	T. Darryl Thompson; Bert Fergus	Marjory Shedd; Joan Hennessy	T. Darryl Thompson; Jean Bardsley
1956	David McTaggart	Jean Miller	Beverley Westcott; William Purcell	Marjory Shedd; Joan Hennessy	William Purcell; Marjory Shedd

=== Canadian National Championships and Canadian Open together ===
Year	Men's singles	Women's singles	Men's doubles	Women's doubles	Mixed doubles
1957	Dave F. McTaggart	Judy Devlin	D. Smythe; H. "Budd" Porter	Sue Devlin; Judy Devlin	R.B. Williams; Ethel Marshall
1958	Dave F. McTaggart	Jean Miller	D. Smythe; H. "Budd" Porter	Marjorie Shedd; J. Hennessy	W. Purcell; Marjorie Shedd
1959	Tan Joe Hok	Judy Devlin	Lim Say Hup; Teh Kew San	S. Devlin; Judy Devlin	D.P. Davis; Judy Devlin
1960	Tan Joe Hok	Marjorie Shedd	Lim Say Hup; Teh Kew San	J.C. Alston; J. J. Armendariz	Finn Kobberø; J. Miller
1961	Erland Kops	Marjorie Shedd	Finn Kobberø; J. Hammergaard Hansen	Marjorie Shedd; D. Tinline	Finn Kobberø; J. Miller

=== Canadian National Championships ===
Year	Men's singles	Women's singles	Men's doubles	Women's doubles	Mixed doubles
1962	Wayne Macdonnell, BC	Marjory Shedd, ON	Jim Poole; Bobby Williams	Marjory Shedd; Dorothy Tinline	Berndt Dahlberg; Dorothy Tinline
1963	Wayne Macdonnell, BC	Marjory Shedd, ON	Bert Fergus; Wayne Macdonnell, BC	Marjory Shedd; Dorothy Tinline, ON	James D. Carnwath; Marjory Shedd, ON
1964	Wayne Macdonnell, BC	Jean Miller, QC	Rolf Paterson; Edward M. Paterson, BC	Marjory Shedd; Dorothy Tinline, ON	James D. Carnwath; Marjory Shedd, ON
1965	Wayne Macdonnell, BC	Sharon Whittaker, BC	Rolf Paterson; Edward M. Paterson, BC	Marjory Shedd; Dorothy Tinline, ON	Rolf Paterson; Mimi Nilsson, BC
1966	Wayne Macdonnell, BC	Jean Folinsbee, AB	Rolf Paterson; Edward M. Paterson, BC	Marjory Shedd; Dorothy Tinline, ON	Yves Paré; Patricia Espley, QC
1967	Wayne Macdonnell, BC	Alison Daysmith, BC	Jamie Paulson; Yves Paré, AB, QC	Jean Miller; Patricia Moody, QC	Yves Paré; Patricia Moody, QC
1968	Jamie Paulson, AB	Sharon Whittaker, BC	Jamie Paulson; Yves Paré, AB, QC	Jean Miller; Patricia Moody, QC	Rolf Paterson; Mimi Nilsson, BC
1969	Jamie Paulson, AB	Judi Rollick, BC	Jamie Paulson; Yves Paré, AB, QC	Marjory Shedd; Barbara Hood, ON	Bruce Rollick; Judi Rollick, BC
1970	Bruce Rollick, BC	Alison Ridgway, BC	Jamie Paulson; Yves Paré, AB, QC	Nancy McKinley; Patricia Moody, ON, QC	Yves Paré; Patricia Moody, QC
1971	Bruce Rollick, BC	Nancy McKinley, ON	Jim Lynch; Dave Charron, ON	Marjory Shedd; Barbara Hood, ON	Rolf Paterson; Mimi Nilsson, BC
1972	Bruce Rollick, BC	Nancy McKinley, ON	Rolf Paterson; Bruce Rollick, BC	Judi Rollick; Mimi Nilsson, BC	Yves Paré; Marjory Shedd, QC, ON
1973	Jamie Paulson, AB	Nancy McKinley, ON	Jamie Paulson; Yves Paré, AB, QC	Judi Rollick; Mimi Nilsson, BC	Raphi Kanchanaraphi; Barbara Welch, ON
1974	Jamie Paulson, AB	Jane Youngberg, BC	Channarong Ratanaseangsuang; Raphi Kanchanaraphi, AB, ON	Jane Youngberg; Barbara Welch, BC, ON	Rolf Paterson; Mimi Nilsson, BC
1975	Bruce Rollick, BC	Alison Delf, AB	Channarong Ratanaseangsuang; Raphi Kanchanaraphi, AB, ON	Jane Youngberg; Barbara Welch, BC; ON	Cam Dalgleish; Wendy Clarkson, AB
1976	Bruce Rollick, BC	Wendy Clarkson, AB	Channarong Ratanaseangsuang; Raphi Kanchanaraphi, AB, ON	Jane Youngberg; Sheri Boyse, BC, AB	Lucio Fabris; Lillian Cozzarini, ON
1977	James McKee, ON	Jane Youngberg, BC	Pat Tryon; Ian Johnson, ON	Jane Youngberg; Barbara Welch, BC, ON	Bruce Rollick; Mimi Nilsson, BC
1978	James McKee, ON	Jane Youngberg, BC	Pat Tryon; Ian Johnson, ON	Jane Youngberg; Claire Backhouse, AB, BC	Greg Carter; Wendy Clarkson, AB
1979	John Czich, ON	Wendy Carter, AB	Raphi Kanchanaraphi; Dominic Soong, ON, QC	Wendy Carter; Claire Backhouse, AB, BC	Greg Carter; Wendy Carter, AB
1980	Pat Tryon, ON	Wendy Carter, AB	Paul Johnson; David deBelle, ON	Jane Youngberg; Claire Backhouse, AB, BC	Paul Johnson; Claire Backhouse, ON, BC
1981	Pat Tryon, ON	Jane Youngberg, BC	John Czich; Keith Priestman, ON	Wendy Carter; Sandra Skillings, BC	Denys Martin; Denyse Julien, QC
1982	Bob MacDougall, AB	Johanne Falardeau, QC	Bob MacDougall; Mark Freitag, AB	Wendy Carter; Sandra Skillings, BC	Bob MacDougall; Wendy Carter, AB, BC
1983	Mike Butler, NB	Denyse Julien, QC	Mike deBelle; Mike Bitten, ON	Johanne Falardeau; Claire Backhouse, QC, BC	Mark Freitag; Linda Cloutier, B QC
1984	Mike Butler, NB	Linda Cloutier, QC	Bob MacDougall; Ken Poole, AB	Johanne Falardeau; Claire Backhouse, QC, BC	Mike Butler; Claire Backhouse, NB, BC
1985	Mike Butler, NB	Claire Backhouse-Sharpe, BC	Mike deBelle; Mike Bitten, ON	Johanne Falardeau; Denyse Julien, QC	Ken Poole; Chantal Jobin, AB, QC
1986	Mike Butler, NB	Denyse Julien, QC	Mike deBelle; Mike Bitten, ON	Johanne Falardeau; Denyse Julien, QC	Mike Butler; Johanne Falardeau, NB, QC
1987	Mike Butler, NB	Denyse Julien, QC	Mike Butler; David Humble, NB, AB	Linda Cloutier; Claire Sharpe, QC, BC	Mike Butler; Claire Sharpe; NB, BC
1988/89	John Goss, AB	Denyse Julien, QC	Bryan Blanshard; Ian Johnston, ON, AB	Johanne Falardeau; Denyse Julien, QC	Anil Kaul; Denyse Julien, BC, QC
1990	Wen Wang, AB	Si-an Deng, BC	Mike Bitten; Bryan Blanshard, ON	Si-an Deng; Doris Piché, BC, QC	Andrew Muir; Johanne Falardeau, AB, QC
1991	Bryan Blanshard, ON	Denyse Julien, QC	Mike Bitten; Bryan Blanshard, ON	Claire Sharpe; Si-an Deng, BC	Anil Kaul; Si-an Deng, AB; BC
1992	Jaimie Dawson, MB	Doris Piché, QC	Mike Bitten; Bryan Blanshard, ON	Doris Piché; Denyse Julien, QC	Anil Kaul; Si-an Deng, AB, BC
1993	David Humble, AB	Si-an Deng, BC	Mike Bitten; Bryan Blanshard, ON	Denyse Julien; Si-an Deng, QC, BC	Bryan Blanshard; Denyse Julien, ON, QC
1994	Wen Wang, AB	Denyse Julien, QC	Mike Bitten; Bryan Blanshard, ON	Milaine Cloutier; Robbyn Hermitage, QC	Bryan Blanshard; Denyse Julien, ON, QC
1995	Jaimie Dawson, MB	Denyse Julien, QC	Anil Kaul; Iain Sydie, BC; AB	Si-an Deng; Denyse Julien, BC, QC	Darryl Yung; Denyse Julien, BC, QC
1996	Iain Sydie, AB	Denyse Julien, QC	Anil Kaul; Iain Sydie, BC, AB	Milaine Cloutier; Robbyn Hermitage, AB, QC	Darryl Yung; Denyse Julien, BC, QC
1997	Wen Wang, AB	Denyse Julien, QC	Iain Sydie; Brent Olynyk, AB, BC	Denyse Julien; Robbyn Hermitage, QC	Iain Sydie; Denyse Julien, AB, QC
1998	Mike Beres, ON	Denyse Julien, QC	Iain Sydie; Darryl Yung, AB, BC	Milaine Cloutier; Robbyn Hermitage, AB, QC	Iain Sydie; Denyse Julien, AB; QC
1999	Andrew Dabeka, ON	Milaine Cloutier, AB	Iain Sydie; Brent Olynyk, AB; BC	Milaine Cloutier; Robbyn Hermitage, AB, QC	Iain Sydie; Denyse Julien, AB, QC
2000	Brian Abra, AB	Denyse Julien, QC	Bryan Moody; Brent Olynyk, QU, BC	Milaine Cloutier; Robbyn Hermitage, AB, QC	Iain Sydie; Denyse Julien, AB, QC
2001	Andrew Dabeka, ON	Denyse Julien, QC	Bryan Moody; Brent Olynyk, QU, BC	Amelie Felx; Robbyn Hermitage, QC	Bryan Moody; Milaine Cloutier, QC, AB
2002	Bob Milroy, ON	Kara Solmundson, MB	Keith Chan; William Milroy, AB	Milaine Cloutier; Robbyn Hermitage, AB, QC	Phil Bourret; Robbyn Hermitage, QU
2003	Andrew Dabeka, ON	Denyse Julien, QC	Mike Beres; Kyle Hunter, ON	Milaine Cloutier; Robbyn Hermitage, AB, QC	William Milroy; Tammy Sun, AB
2004	Stephan Wojcikiewicz, ON	Anna Rice, AB	Keith Chan; William Milroy, AB	Milaine Cloutier; Denyse Julien, AB, QC	William Milroy; Tammy Sun, AB
2005	Andrew Dabeka, ON	Anna Rice, BC	Mike Beres; William Milroy, ON, AB	Charmaine Reid; Helen Nichol, ON, AB	William Milroy; Tammy Sun, AB
2006	Andrew Dabeka, ON	Charmaine Reid, ON	Mike Beres; William Milroy, ON, AB	Charmaine Reid; Helen Nichol, ON, AB	Mike Beres; Val Loker, ON, QU
2007	Mike Beres, ON	Charmaine Reid, ON	Mike Beres; William Milroy, ON, AB	Charmaine Reid; Fiona McKee, ON	Mike Beres; Val Loker, ON, QU
2008	David Snider, MB	Anna Rice, BC	Mike Beres; William Milroy, ON, AB	Milaine Cloutier; Valérie Loker, AB, QU	Mathieu Laforest; Amélie Felx QC
2009	Andrew Dabeka, ON	Anna Rice, BC	Toby Ng, BC; William Milroy, AB	Milaine Cloutier; Grace Gao, AB	William Milroy, AB; Fiona McKee, ON
2010	Alex Pang, AB	Anna Rice, BC	Alvin Lau, BC; Jonathan Vandervet, AB	Lydia Jiang; Melody Liang, BC	Jonathan Vandervet; Milaine Cloutier, AB
2011	David Snider, MB	Michelle Li, ON	Adrian Liu; Derrick Ng, BC	Alex Bruce; Michelle Li, ON	Toby Ng, BC; Grace Gao, AB
2012	Alex Pang, AB	Michelle Li, ON	Adrian Liu; Derrick Ng, BC	Grace Gao, AB; Joycelyn Ko, ON	Toby Ng, BC; Grace Gao, AB
2013	Bob Milroy, BC	Michelle Li, ON	Adrian Liu; Derrick Ng, BC	Alex Bruce, ON; Phyllis Chan, BC	Toby Ng, BC; Grace Gao, AB
2014	David Snider, MB	Michelle Li, ON	Adrian Liu; Derrick Ng, BC	Alex Bruce, ON; Phyllis Chan, BC	Derrick Ng; Kristen Tsai, BC
2015	Andrew D'Souza, ON	Michelle Li, ON	Adrian Liu; Derrick Ng, BC	Alex Bruce, ON; Phyllis Chan, BC	Toby Ng, BC; Alex Bruce, ON
2016	Jason Ho-Shue, ON	Michelle Li, ON	Adrian Liu; Derrick Ng, BC	Michelle Li; Rachel Honderich, ON	Toby Ng, BC; Alex Bruce, ON
2017	Jason Ho-Shue, ON	Brittney Tam, ON	Jason Ho-Shue; Nyl Yakura, ON	Michelle Tong, ON; Josephine Wu, AB	Toby Ng, BC; Rachel Honderich, ON
2018	Jason Ho-Shue, ON	Michelle Li, ON	Jason Ho-Shue; Nyl Yakura, ON	Rachel Honderich, ON; Kristen Tsai, BC	Nyl Yakura, ON; Kristen Tsai, BC
2019	Brian Yang, ON	Michelle Li, ON	Jason Ho-Shue; Nyl Yakura, ON	Rachel Honderich, ON; Kristen Tsai, BC	Joshua Hurlburt-Yu, ON; Josephine Wu, AB
2020	Jason Ho-Shue, ON	Rachel Chan, ON	Jason Ho-Shue; Nyl Yakura, ON	Rachel Honderich, ON; Kristen Tsai, BC	Joshua Hurlburt-Yu, ON; Josephine Wu, AB
2021	no competition	no competition	no competition	no competition	no competition
2022	Jason Ho-Shue, ON	Talia Ng, ON	Ty Alexander Lindeman; Kevin Lee, AB	Catherine Choi, ON; Josephine Wu, AB	Ty Alexander Lindeman; Josephine Wu, AB
2023	Victor Lai, ON	Jackie Dent, ON	Andy Ko; Kevin Lee, AB	Camille Leblanc; Alexandra Mocanu, QC	Kevin Lee, AB; Eliana-R Zhang, QC
2024	Victor Lai, ON	Rachel Chan, ON	Andy Ko, AB; Duncan Yao, BC	Jacqueline Cheung; Rachel Honderich, ON	Jonathan Lai; Rachel Honderich, ON
2025	Timothy Lock	Emma Meng	Daniel Leung; Timothy Lock	Emma Meng; Sophia Nong	Timothy Lock; Chloe Hoang
