= Converse (brand) =

American lifestyle brand owned by Nike, Inc.

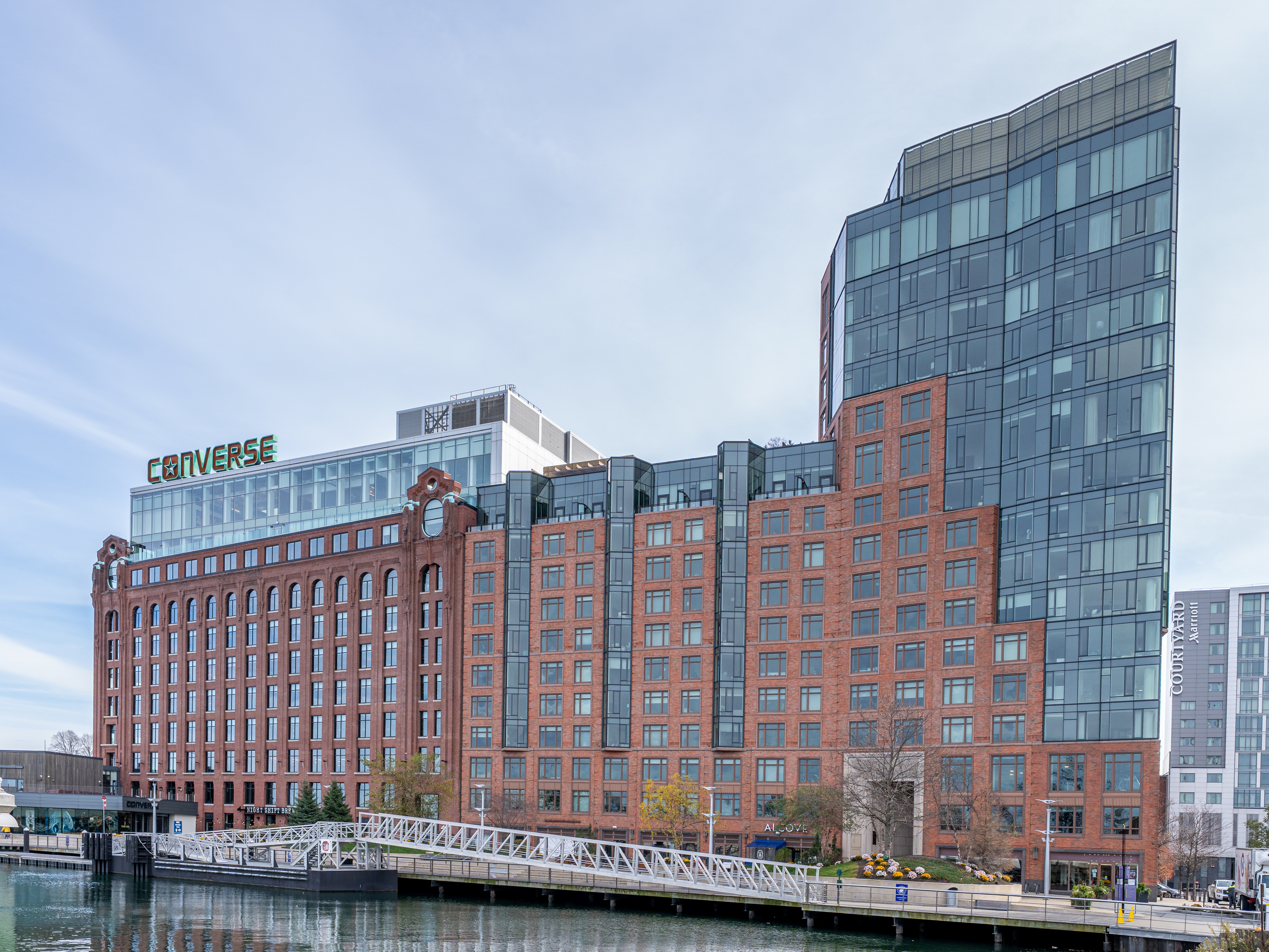
- World headquarters building on Boston's Lovejoy Wharf
- Type: Subsidiary
- Industry: Footwear; Textile
- Founded: February 1908; 118 years ago in Malden, Massachusetts, U.S.
- Founder: Marquis Mills Converse
- Headquarters: Boston, Massachusetts, U.S.
- Number of locations: 136 (2023)
- Area served: Worldwide
- Key people: Aaron Cain (president and CEO)
- Products: Sneakers; Clothing; Accessories
- Brands: Chuck Taylor All-Stars; Cons; Jack Purcell; One Star; The Weapon
- Revenue: ▲US$2.4 billion (2023)
- Parent: Eltra Corporation (1972–1979); Allied Corporation (1979–1982); Interco (1986–1994); Nike, Inc. (2003–present)
- Website: converse.com

Converse (/ˈkɒnvərs/) is an American lifestyle brand that markets, distributes, and licenses footwear, apparel, and accessories. The company was founded by Marquis Mills Converse in 1908, originally as the Converse Rubber Shoe Company in Malden, Massachusetts. It was acquired by several companies before becoming a subsidiary of Nike, Inc. in 2003.

Converse initially produced winterized rubber-soled shoes and boots. During World War II, it shifted manufacturing to make footwear for the military. Initially, it was one of the few producers of athletic shoes and dominated the U.S. market, but lost its position in the 1970s as competitors introduced their own styles.

Converse's portfolio includes products under the Chuck Taylor All-Stars, Cons, Jack Purcell, One Star, and Star Chevron trademarks. It frequently collaborates on special-edition product releases with other brands, such as John Varvatos. The growth of Converse as a casual fashion accessory contributed to $2.4 billion in revenue in 2023.

== History ==
=== 1908–1940: Early years ===
Forty-seven-year-old Marquis Mills Converse, a manager at a footwear manufacturing firm, opened the Converse Rubber Shoe Company in February 1908, in Malden, Massachusetts. The company was a rubber shoe manufacturer, and its early inventory included winterized rubber-soled footwear, galoshes, tennis shoes, and some non-footwear items like automobile tires. In the summer of 1916, the Converse basketball line was established; by 1917 the Converse All-Star basketball shoe was introduced and quickly became successful during World War I and the Spanish flu.

In 1922, basketball player Charles H. "Chuck" Taylor walked into Converse complaining of sore feet, and Converse gave him a job as a salesman and ambassador. He promoted the shoes around the U.S., and in 1932, Taylor's signature was added to the All-Star patch on the high-top sneakers. He continued this work until shortly before his death in 1969. Although sales for the All-Star rose initially, the company entered bankruptcy in 1929. The Stone family purchased Converse in 1939.

=== 1941–2001: War, rise, and bankruptcy ===
When the U.S. entered World War II in 1941, Converse shifted production to manufacturing rubberized footwear, outerwear, and protective suits for the military. After the war's end, the company resumed production of athletic footwear and chiefly made a high top shoe, in either black or white. In the 1950s and 1960s, Converse promoted an American image with its Converse Basketball Yearbook. Artist Charles Kerins created cover art that celebrated Converse's role in the lives of high school and college athletes. In 1957, Converse came out with a low-cut style of All-Stars. By 1966, the shoe was also available in school colors.

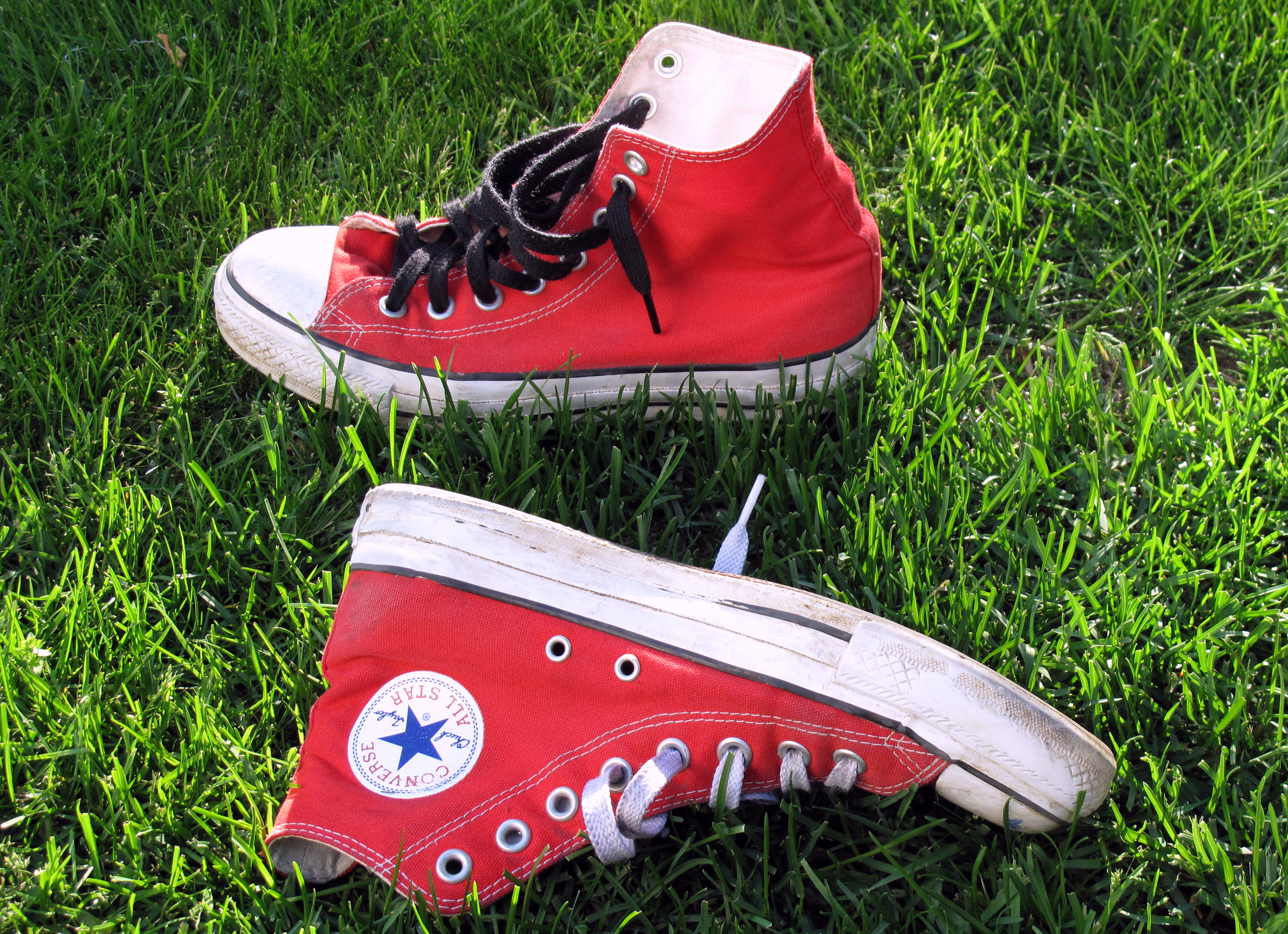
Red pair of Converse Chuck Taylor All Stars

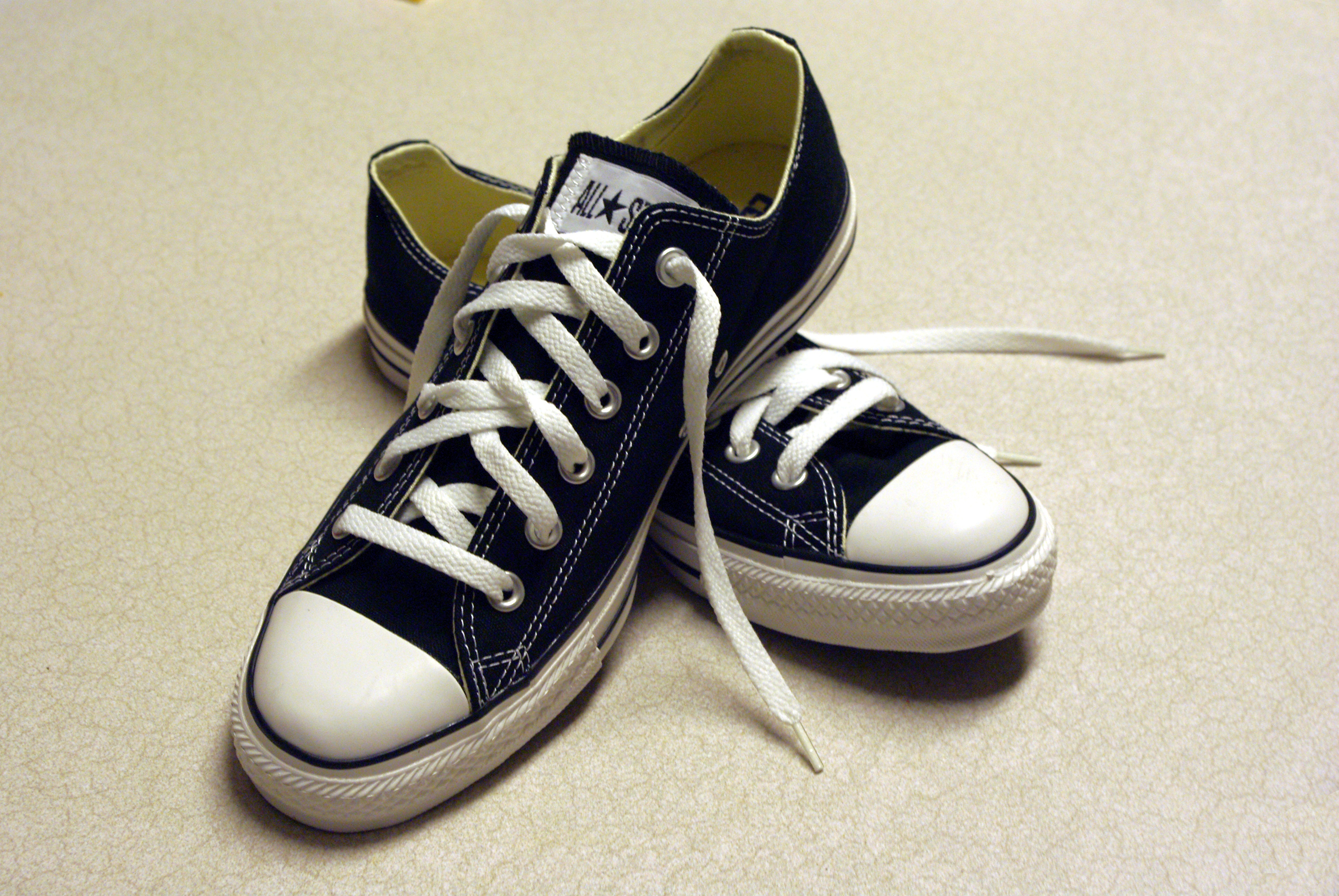
Black Converse sneakers

Converse customized shoes for the New York Renaissance (the "Rens"), the first all-African-American professional basketball team. The shoes were designed to be "non-skid", which gave basketball players better grip. An extra strip of rubber was eventually added to protect the shoes from constant pivoting; this was called the "pivot button". In 1962, center Wilt Chamberlain of the Philadelphia Warriors scored 100 points in a National Basketball Association (NBA) game while wearing a pair of All-Stars, taking a 169–147 victory over the New York Knicks in Hershey, Pennsylvania, on March 2.

By the early 1970s, Converse had diversified to include manufacturing sporting goods and industrial products. Converse was acquired by the Eltra Corporation in 1972, and bought out one of its biggest competitors at the time, PF Flyers, from B.F. Goodrich. However, federal courts ruled the sale a monopoly and the deal was subsequently broken up through antitrust litigation. Converse only retained the trademark rights to the Jack Purcell line, which it still produces. The chevron-and-star insignia—a logo that remains on a large portion of Converse footwear—was created by Jim Labadini, an employee.

Eltra was acquired by Allied Corporation in 1979. Allied moved out of the consumer products business in the 1980s, and in October 1986, Converse was acquired by Interco Incorporated and spun off in 1994.

Converse lost its athletic shoe monopoly from the 1970s onward, as new competitors, including Puma, Adidas, and Nike, grew in popularity. A decade later, as Reebok introduced new designs and technology to the sports market, Converse was no longer the official shoe of the NBA. Although canvas-rubber shoes regained popularity in the 1980s as casual footwear, Converse eventually became too dependent on the "All Stars" basketball brand, whose market collapsed by 1989–1990. In 1991, parent company Interco filed for Chapter 11 bankruptcy protection. In 2000, Converse was slipping repeatedly into receivership as debt piled up yearly.

Converse filed for bankruptcy on January 22, 2001. On March 30, its last manufacturing plants in the U.S. closed down, as production fully moved overseas. In April 2001, Footwear Acquisitions, led by Marsden Cason and Bill Simon, purchased the brand from bankruptcy and added industry partners Jack Boys, Jim Stroesser, Lisa Kempa, and David Maddocks to lead the turnaround. During this period, Converse moved its headquarters from North Reading, Massachusetts, to North Andover, Massachusetts. The company was located in the town of North Andover for 13 years.

=== 2002–present: Acquisition by Nike and new headquarters ===
In July 2003, Nike paid US$309 million to acquire Converse. In January 2013, Converse announced plans for a new headquarters building. It was constructed near North Station in downtown Boston, on the Lovejoy Wharf, as part of a site overhaul and restoration of public waterfront access. The 10-story 214,000-square-foot (19,900 m^{2}) office building includes a permanent music recording studio, 5,000-square-foot (460 m^{2}) gym with separate yoga studio, and a 3,500-square-foot (330 m^{2}) retail store.

In May 2023, Converse hired Jared Carver as the new president and CEO. In August 2025, Carver stepped down from his role as president and CEO. He was replaced by Aaron Cain, who was previously vice president and general manager of Nike Global Men's business.

Converse sparked renewed popularity among teens in 2025, driven in part by a limited-edition collaboration with pop star Charli XCX.

=== August/September 2026 ad campaign controversy ===
On August 27, 2026, the Chuck 70 X was released worldwide. Its ad featured South Korean singer Karina standing in a Converse star while wearing a white skirt and holding a pair of black Chuck 70 X shoes in her left hand. The lighting in the image lands on the skirt in a manner that was perceived by some viewers on social media as depicting a Klan hood. They also argued that the shoes' position gave the appearance of "two dangling legs". Converse issued an apology, pulling the ad from social media, as well as all its websites except the one in the Philippines, on September 18.

A second ad for a collaborative product developed with the Danish brand Palmes depicted a man on a ladder holding a pair of shoes hanging from a tree branch. It promoted the Jack Purcell PDM sneaker released in September 2026, and was posted to Converse's Malaysia Instagram account. One Threads account, juxtaposing the images side by side, claimed that they evoked the Billie Holiday song "Strange Fruit".

== Legal issues ==
Starting in July 2008, Converse sent around 180 cease-and-desist letters to over 30 companies that they claimed were violating the Chuck Taylor All-Stars trademark and selling so-called look-alike sneakers. In October 2014, Converse filed a lawsuit against 30 companies for allegedly infringing on its generic sneaker style's bumper toe, striped midsole, and toe cap. The brand argued that companies were violating an alleged common-law trademark by importing sneakers with similar elements. Several companies settled with Converse and they were dropped from the list.

In November 2015, Charles Bullock, chief administrative judge at the International Trade Commission, preliminarily ruled that several brands Converse filed against were violating Converse's outsole design trademarks, i.e. the pattern on the bottom of the sole of the shoe. The soles of the shoes are designed to allow players to jump or move in all directions. The diamond pattern makes this possible. Judge Bullock further ruled that while Skechers "Twinkle Toes" brands did share similarities to Converse, "Twinkle Toes" were different enough and marketed in a way for it not to be mistaken for Chuck Taylor All-Stars. Judge Bullock also ruled that most of the shoes sold by Highline United under the Ash brand did not infringe and that Converse did not have a valid common law mark for its midsole.

On June 23, 2016, the anniversary of the death of Chuck Taylor, the International Trade Commission ruled that Converse's alleged trade dress for the midsole design of a combined toe cap, toe bumper, and stripe was not entitled to trademark protection under the common law and found invalid Converse's federal trademark registration. The case was appealed to the U.S. Court of Appeals for the Federal Circuit, which ruled that the ITC had used the wrong test and remanded the case. On remand, the ITC ruled that Converse's trade dress was protectable but not infringed.

== Products ==
=== Chuck Taylor All-Stars ===
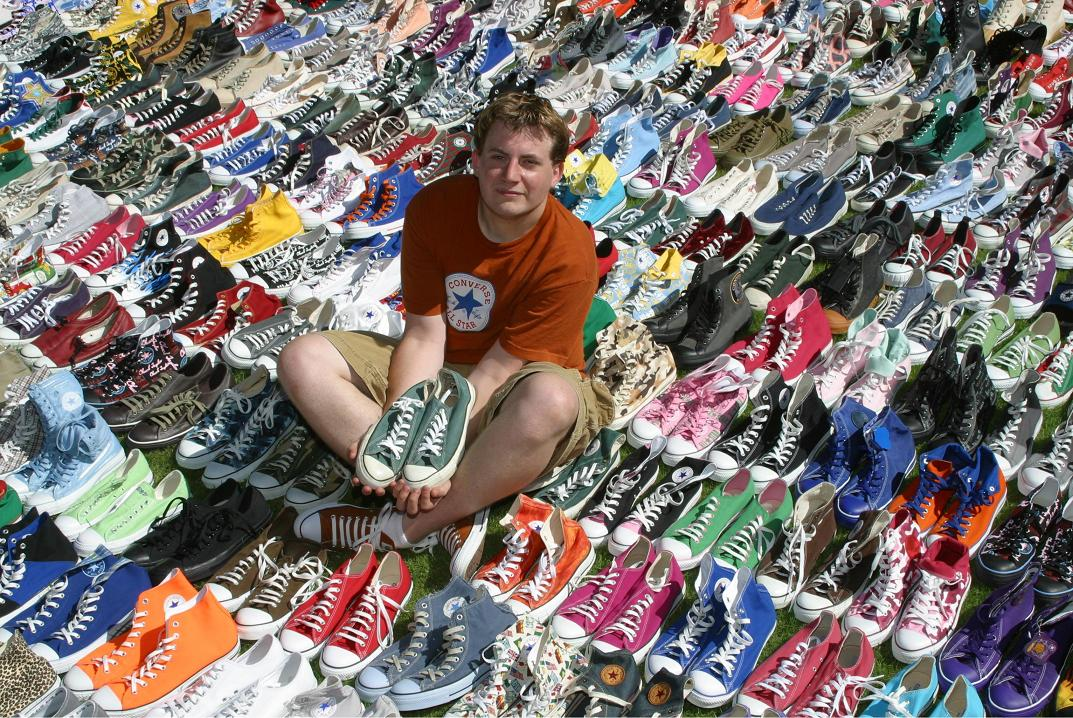
Joshua Mueller, Guinness Book of World Records holder for a most significant collection of "Chucks", photographed in 2006

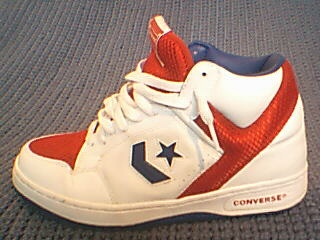
The Weapon, manufactured in many different color schemes

Converse started making an early basketball shoe in 1917 and redesigned it in 1922, when Chuck Taylor asked the company to create a better shoe with more support and flexibility. After Converse added Taylor's signature to the ankle patch they became known as Chuck Taylor All Stars. By the 1960s the company had captured about 70 to 80 percent of the basketball shoe market, but the shoe declined in popularity during the 1970s when basketball players wore competing brands. Chuck Taylor All-Stars enjoyed a comeback in popularity in the 1980s as retro-style casual footwear.

Chuck Taylor All-Stars have made an appearance in over 650 films, such as Back to the Future, I, Robot, Grease and Stand by Me. David Tennant (playing the Tenth Doctor) wore red and cream versions of Hi-top Converse on science-fiction show Doctor Who.

A redesigned model of the Chuck Taylor All-Star, the "Chuck Taylor II", was released on July 28, 2015. Incorporating Nike technology, it retains most of the original's outward appearance while employing newer materials for the insole.

=== The Weapon ===
In 1986, Converse released "The Weapon" basketball shoe. Manufactured in two color schemes to match the kit colors of basketball teams, it has been available in both high-top and low-cut varieties. It had leather construction throughout, including the inside heel which was also heavily padded for comfort. The first endorsers of "The Weapon" were Larry Bird and Magic Johnson, who were prominently featured in a Converse commercial set in Bird's hometown of French Lick, Indiana in 1985. They were also worn by Axl Rose in the Guns N' Roses music video "Estranged".

Converse re-released "The Weapon" classic (which Kobe Bryant wore at least three times in 2002 and Andre Miller wore in 2002 from mid-August to early September) several times from 1999 to 2003 and after, "The Loaded Weapon" in 2003, "The Weapon 86" in 2008 (and the Poorman version in 2009, and the John Varvatos version in 2012), "The Weapon EVO" in 2009, and its successor "The Star Player EVO" (sometimes reduced to "The Star Plyr EVO" or "The Star Ply EVO") in 2010.

Before "The Weapon", Converse launched the "One Star" in 1974, the "Pro Leather" in 1976 and the "Starion" in 1984, all known for basketball and basketball performance.

== Sponsorships ==
In 2019, Converse returned to performance basketball with the All-Star Pro BB. Kelly Oubre Jr. was the first player to try out the new product, which combined the traditional Converse silhouette with the contemporary Nike technology. Thereafter Converse signed Draymond Green in March 2020, Natasha Cloud (the first WNBA player) in June, Shai Gilgeous-Alexander in July, and, thereafter, Rudy Gay, P. J. Tucker, DeAndre' Bembry, De'Anthony Melton, Nickeil Alexander-Walker, Immanuel Quickley, Deividas Sirvydis, Jordan Clarkson, Josh Richardson, David Duke Jr., and Brandon Williams. Some of the aforementioned players also wear other brands.

Gilgeous-Alexander, point guard for the Oklahoma City Thunder, has become the new face of the brand. The shoe, "Chase the Drip", was released on September 13, 2022.

=== Basketball ===
==== Former college teams ====
- Marquette Golden Eagles – switched to Jordan Brand following most famous alum, Dwyane Wade
- Western Kentucky Hilltoppers – shoes only

==== Former basketball teams ====
- (Italy) Auxilium Pallacanestro Torino (1984–1988)

=== Football ===
==== Soccer club teams ====
- (England) Liverpool (From 2023-24 season)

==== Former Soccer teams ====
- (Colombia) Atlético Nacional (2001–2002)
- (Romania) Politehnica Timișoara (2006–2008)

== Skateboarding ==
In the 1980s, Converse sponsored several influential skaters, including Jason Jessee, Rodney Mullen, and Mark Rogowski. Under the "Cons" brand, Converse launched its skateboarding program in 2009 with a team that included Kenny Anderson, Anthony Pappalardo, Nick Trapasso, Sammy Baca, Ethan Fowler, Raymond Molinar, and Rune Glifberg. The company added Jason Jessee and Mike Anderson to the team in 2012.

In August 2012, Converse sponsored a skate event at Huntington Beach, California, with Trapasso, Tom Remillard, Aaron Homoki, Greyson Fletcher, Ben Raemers, Ben Hatchell, Ben Raybourn and Robbie Russo. Raybourn won the $20,000 grand prize, and Homoki won the $3,000 Best Trick contest.

As of July 2014, the team consisted of original members Anderson, Trapasso, Baca, and Glifberg, and had added Jessee, Anderson, Julian Davidson, Remillard, Zered Bassett, Ben Raemers, Jake Johnson, Eli Reed, Louie Lopez, Sage Elsesser, and Sean Pablo. Bassett filmed an advertisement that was broadcast online in July 2014, in which he skateboarded through New York City in a newly launched skate shoe version of the Converse Weapon model.

In February 2024, Converse and Phaidon published Skateboard, a book about the history of skateboarding since the 1950s, compiled by designer and skater Jonathan Olivares.

== Philanthropy ==
The brand released a special collection named "1Hund (RED)", allocating 15 percent of the profits to HIV/AIDS prevention programs. As part of the (RED) campaign, 100 artists from around the world designed products for the collection. In February 2010, professional skateboarder Anthony Pappalardo released a (RED) edition of his signature skate shoe. Pappalardo stated:

I got into woodworking about two years ago, through a buddy of mine who I used to skate with every day—he turned into a woodworker. So he gave me this scrap box of wood ... It just definitely started consuming me as skating did. I wanted to read about it, you know? Go on the internet and watch videos about it, and just learn anything and everything I could about woodworking. The first thing I ever made was a bench, and that's, kinda, what I've been making ever since. The cool thing about working with Product (RED) is just by doing the two things that I love, I'm also able to help people.

In 2012, Converse was listed as a partner in the (RED) campaign alongside other companies like Nike, Inc., Girl, and Bugaboo. The campaign's mission is to prevent the transmission of the HIV virus from mother to child by 2015, operating under the slogan "Fighting For An AIDS Free Generation".

In the winter of 2018, Converse collaborated with several Los Angeles figures on a collection focused on local culture. participants selected for the project included Vince Staples, Dr. Woo, Rocket, BornXRaised, and Clot.
