= Donald Smythe =

Canadian badminton player (1924–2016)

Donald Smythe (April 27, 1924 – November 20, 2016) was a Canadian badminton player who won nine Canadian national titles (4 in singles, 5 in men's doubles) and represented his country internationally during the 1950s. Known for his tenacity and consistency, Smythe is the only North American, besides the legendary Dave Freeman to reach the final round of men's singles at the prestigious All-England Championships (1954). Smythe played Thomas Cup (men's international team competition) for Canada in three consecutive campaigns between 1951 and 1958.

He was inducted into the Canadian Amateur Athletic Hall of Fame in 1974.
