= Jack Purcell =

Canadian badminton player

John Edward Purcell (December 24, 1903 – June 10, 1991) was a Canadian badminton player. Purcell was the Canadian National Badminton Champion in 1929 and 1930. He retired in 1945, and pursued a career as a stockbroker. Purcell also designed an athletic shoe that bears his name, which is still popular today.

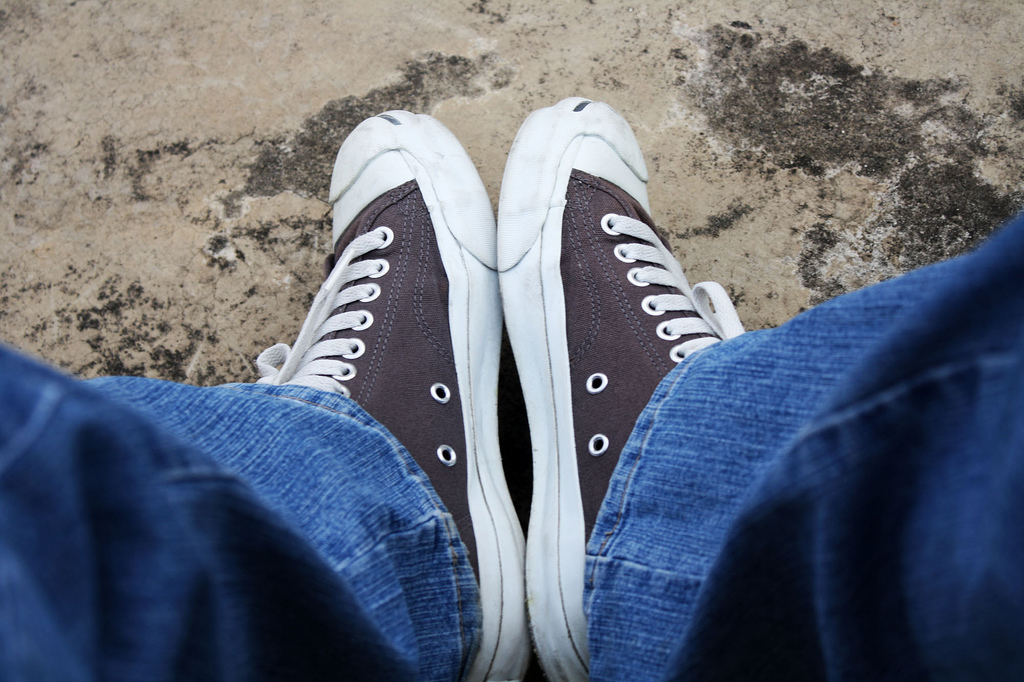
Jack Purcell designed the eponymous sneaker shown here.

== Early years ==
Born in Guelph, Ontario, Purcell excelled at tennis and golf as a child. He took up badminton in 1924, and rose quickly in Ontario's amateur ranks. Purcell won five consecutive Ontario championships from 1927 to 1931, and was the Canadian National Badminton Champion in 1929 and 1930. Purcell became the leading badminton player in Canada, which led him to write a badminton column for the Toronto Star. In 1931, Purcell traveled to England, having beaten all his competitors in Canada. There, he won the Surrey Doubles but got only as far as the semi-finals in the All-England Championships.

== World badminton champion ==
After his trip to England, Purcell returned to Canada only to learn that he was stripped of his amateur status. The Canadian Badminton Association claimed that his Toronto Star articles made him a paid professional. As a professional badminton player, however, Purcell beat all the leading players in the world by 1932. He was declared world champion in 1933 based on his beating the top Canadian, American and British badminton players. His world championship status was challenged numerous times, but Purcell remained unbeaten until his retirement in 1945.

== Retirement and later years ==
In 1950, the Canadian Press named Purcell as Canada’s Outstanding Athlete of the 20th Century in the miscellaneous sports category. He was inducted into the Canadian Olympic Hall of Fame in 1973 despite having never played in the Olympic Games. At the time of his induction badminton was still not an Olympic sport. In 1955, he was inducted into Canada's Sports Hall of Fame.

Outside of sports, Purcell was a stockbroker and a member of the Toronto Stock Exchange. He died in Toronto in 1991 at age 87.

== Shoes ==
Purcell designed a low-cut canvas badminton shoe for B.F. Goodrich's PF Flyers brand in 1933. The shoe provided better support on badminton courts because of a steel shank in its heel. For most of the twentieth century, Jack Purcell's sneaker was required wear on all grass and clay tennis courts in the United States and, for a time, on newer all-weather asphalt courts. Unlike basketball sneakers (running shoes hadn't been invented yet), Jack Purcell sneakers had perfectly flat soles, unmarred by grooves that could tear up clay or grass and skew the elasticity of tennis ball bounces. In 1972, Converse purchased PF Flyers, along with the trademark rights of Jack Purcell sneakers. When Nike bought Converse in 2003, Jack Purcell sneakers were kept in production, and are still manufactured. Classic Purcell tennis sneakers are unchanged in appearance from their heyday in the 1950s and 1960s, when they were first nicknamed "Blue Tips" and "Smilies", but they have risen in price from about $20 in 1965 to as much as $150 or more today. Converse "Jack Purcell" basketball sneakers are also popular, but more for their vintage fashion appeal than for athletic use.
