= David McTaggart =

Canadian badminton player and environmentalist

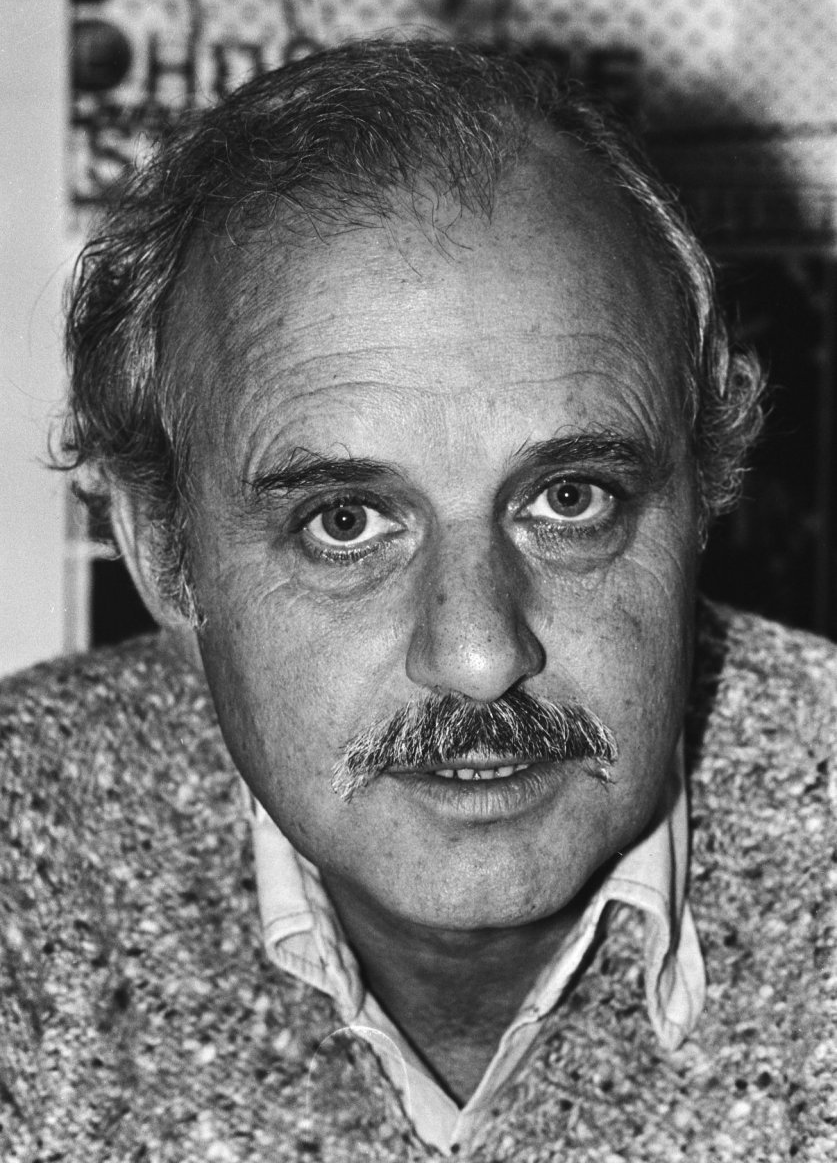
- David McTaggart in 1981
- Born: David Fraser McTaggart; June 23, 1932; Vancouver, British Columbia, Canada
- Died: March 23, 2001 (aged 68); Perugia, Italy
- Known for: Work with Greenpeace

David Fraser McTaggart (June 24, 1932 – March 23, 2001) was a Canadian badminton player and an environmentalist who played a central part in the foundation of Greenpeace International.

An excellent all-around athlete, as a young man he won three consecutive Canadian National Badminton Championships in men's singles (1956–1958) and represented that country in badminton's Thomas Cup (men's world team championship) competition. Prior to his involvement in Greenpeace he had prospered as a builder and developer.

In 1972, responding to an ad in the newspapers, he used his personal boat to protest the testing of nuclear weapons in the Pacific by the French government. After getting his boat damaged and being physically hurt by the French Military, his protest succeeded in 1974 when the French announced the end of their atmospheric nuclear testing program. McTaggart spent the next several years pursuing legal action against the French government and assisting in the formation of Greenpeace affiliates across Western Europe. In 1979 he brokered an agreement that led to the formation of Greenpeace International, ending the leadership of the original founding group based in Vancouver, Canada. He became chairman and chief spokesman for Greenpeace in 1979, retiring in 1991 to live on an olive farm in Paciano, Umbria, Italy.

McTaggart continued to participate in Greenpeace forums after retirement for the rest of his life. He and singer Bryan Adams did a massive postcard campaign to help create the Southern Antarctic Whale Sanctuary. For nearly two years they toured the world asking thousands of concert goers to write to countries involved with whaling to support the sanctuary. The Southern Ocean Whale Sanctuary was established by the IWC in 1994 with 23 countries supporting the agreement and Japan opposing it.

Te Vaka dedicated its song "Sei Ma Le Losa" to McTaggart, who was killed in a car accident on March 23, 2001, near his home in Italy.

In 1987 McTaggart founded the Third Millennium Foundation, a US 501(c)(3) dedicated to continuing his work for disarmament, peace, and a sustainable future. The foundation, headquartered in his former home in Paciano, Italy, continues today promoting local and global projects in his memory.

In 1996 he received the journalistic prize Golden Doves for Peace issued by the Italian Research Institute Archivio Disarmo.

== See also ==
- Anti-nuclear movement
- List of peace activists
