= Marjory Shedd =

Canadian badminton player (1926–2008)

Marjory Shedd (March 17, 1926 – May 10, 2008) was a world-class Canadian badminton player who won numerous titles from the early 1950s to the early 1970s. Shedd won a total of 23 Canadian National Championships (6 in singles, 12 in women's doubles, and 5 in mixed doubles), as well as several Canadian Open Championships, between 1953 and 1972. These wins, along with her 44 provincial titles, earned her more badminton titles than any other Canadian in history. She was one of only a few women to defeat the great U.S. player Margaret Varner in singles competition during the late 1950s, and twice reached the semifinal of women's singles at the All England Championships, then considered the unofficial world championship of the sport. Shedd played on six consecutive Canadian Uber Cup (women's international) teams between 1956 and 1972. A gifted all-around athlete, Shedd was also a member of two national championship basketball teams and several national volleyball teams. Later in her career she shared her formidable expertise with others, coaching the University of Toronto volleyball team from 1964 to 1974, and the U of T badminton team from 1973 to 1991. Her accomplishments were formally honoured in 1970 when she was inducted into Canada's Sports Hall of Fame. She died in 2008 and is buried in Park Lawn Cemetery.
