= 1957 Uber Cup =

Tournament details
- Dates: 13 – 18 March 1957
- Edition: 1st
- Level: International
- Nations: 4
- Location: Eastbourne, England; Lytham St Annes, England

The 1957 Uber Cup was the inaugural Uber Cup; a women's international team badminton championship promoted by Betty Uber. Eleven nations took part competing first (as in Thomas Cup competition) within zones to qualify for interzone matches. The final round was held in Lytham St Annes, Lancashire, England on 18 March 1957. The United States won the event, defeating Denmark.

== Qualification ==
Three teams qualified for the interzone stage of the competition, the United States, India, and Denmark. Denmark received a bye in the first round to go directly into the final. Originally four teams were to be represented in the interzone matches, but New Zealand which qualified from Australasia withdrew.

| Means of qualification | Date | Venue | Slot | Qualified teams |
|---|---|---|---|---|
| Asian Zone | 30 August – 22 December 1956 | Hong Kong; Kuala Lumpur | 1 | India |
| American Zone | 25 – 26 February 1957 | Kitchener | 1 | United States |
| European Zone | 17 November 1956 – 16 February 1957 | Belfast; Dublin; Wimbledon | 1 | Denmark |
| Australasian Zone | – | – | 1 | New Zealand |
| Total | | | 4 | |

== Knockout stage ==
The United States team with the Uber Cup after winning the inaugural tournament in 1957.

The following four teams, shown by region, qualified for the 1957 Uber Cup. In the semi-finals, the United States defeated India 7–0. New Zealand withdrew from the competition, giving Denmark a place in the final.

The United States and Denmark competed in the final. 7 matches were played: 3 singles and 4 doubles (2 doubles, then reversed). Winning all three of her matches, Judy Devlin led the way to a decisive 6–1 victory for the USA.

=== Bracket ===
Semi-finals
13 March 1957 – Eastbourne
United States | 7
India | 0
New Zealand
Denmark | w/o

Final
18 March 1957 – Lytham St Annes
United States | 6
Denmark | 1

=== Semi-finals ===
13 March 1957

| United States | 7–0 | India |
Report

Eastbourne, England

March 1957

| Denmark | – | New Zealand |
Report

England

=== Final ===
18 March 1957

| United States | 6–1 | Denmark |
Report

Lytham St Annes, England

1957 Uber Cup winner

United States
First title
