= Jack Underhill =

Australian rugby league footballer

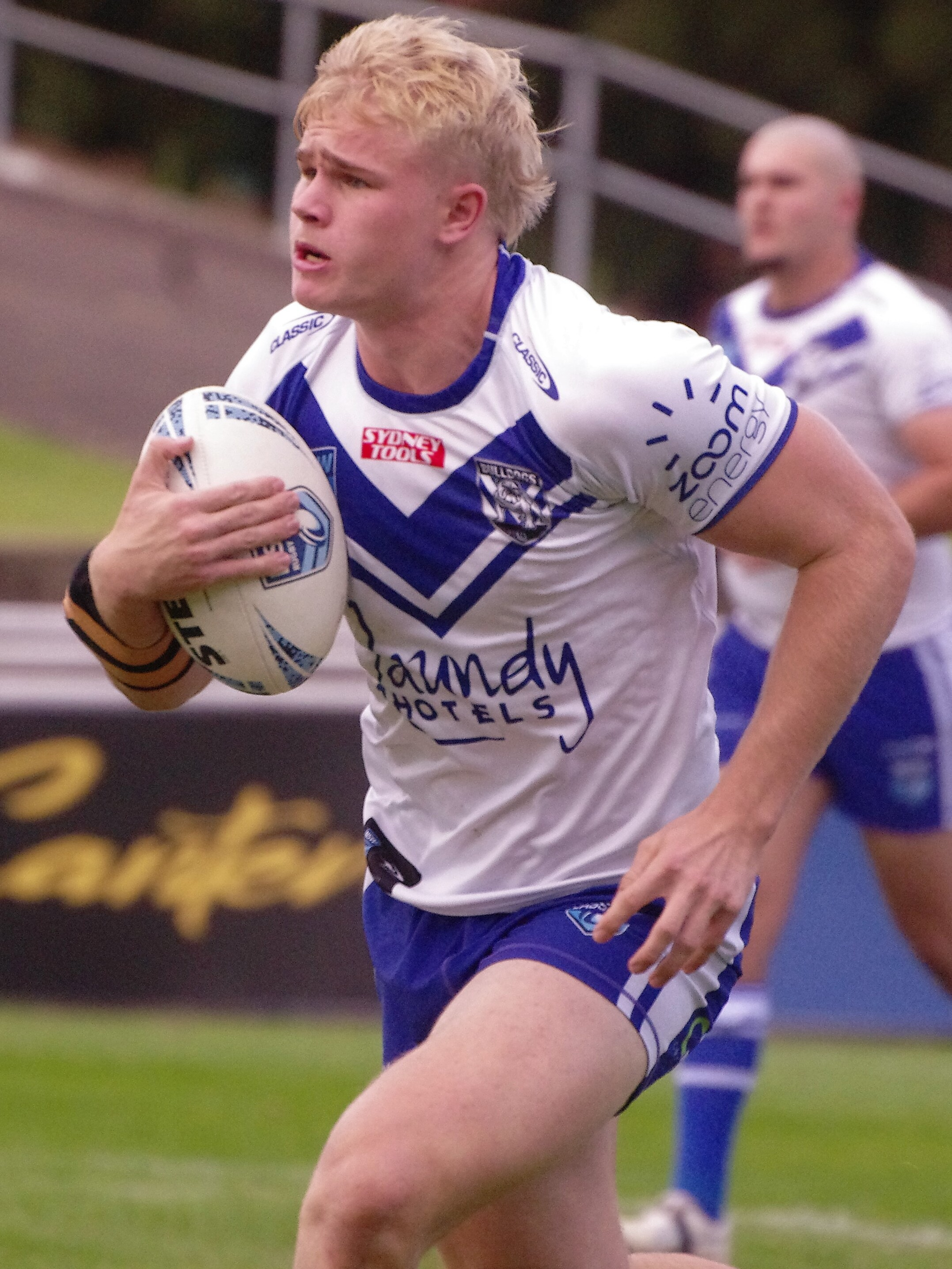

Personal information
- Full name: Jack Underhill
- Born: 2004 (age 21–22)

Playing information
- Position: Prop
Club
| Years | Team | Pld | T | G | FG | P |
|---|---|---|---|---|---|---|
| 2026– | Canterbury Bulldogs | 7 | 0 | 0 | 0 | 0 |
- Source: As of 16 November 2026
- Education: Mountain Creek State High School

Jack Underhill (born 2004) is an Australian professional rugby league footballer who plays as a lock forward for the Canterbury Bulldogs in the NRL.

== Early life ==
Underhill is originally from the Sunshine Coast. He was educated at Mountain Creek State High School graduating in 2021 as a member of their Rugby League Academy and played his junior football for the Kawana Dolphins. He represented the Sunshine Coast region in their Under 12, Under 15 and Open Schoolboy sides and also was selected in the Queensland Under 12 Schoolboy side.

== Playing career ==
Underhill's career started in 2021 for the Sunshine Coast Falcons in the Mal Meninga Cup. Upon showing prominence on the field he was selected for the Queensland Country Under 17 Representative team for the annual City vs Country Clash. In 2022, he progressed onto the Hastings Deering Colts competition while being on a development contract with the Melbourne Storm.

At the end of 2022, he was selected on the S. G. Ball Cup Summer Training Squad for the Canterbury Bulldogs. Upon later selection, he debuted in the S. G. Ball Cup for the Canterbury Bulldogs in Round 1, 2023 against the St. George Dragons. He then progressed onto the Jersey Flegg Cup debuting in Round 12, 2023 against the Canberra Raiders At the end of the 2023 season, Underhill was signed on a full-time contract with the Canterbury Bulldogs until 2027.

Underhill debuted in the NSW Cup during Round 10, 2024 against the Penrith Panthers. He later played 13 more NSW Cup games that year and finished his season winning the 2024 Jersey Flegg Grand Final against the Cronulla-Sutherland Sharks while being awarded Man of the Match. At the start of 2025, then signed a one-year contract extension with the Canterbury Bulldogs to 2028.

During the Canterbury Bulldogs match versus the Cronulla-Sutherland Sharks in Round 11 (Magic Round) of the 2026 Season, Underhill made his NRL Debut as Bulldog #880. In his second game the following week against Melbourne Storm, Underhill made a highlight tackle that played a crucial part in his sides' win ending their 5-game losing streak.

== Honours ==
Individual

- Jersey Flegg Cup Grand Final Player of the Match: 2024

Canterbury-Bankstown Bulldogs #880

- Jersey Flegg Cup: 2024

== Statistics ==
| Year | Team | Games | Tries | Pts |
|---|---|---|---|---|
| 2026 | Canterbury Bulldogs | 6 | 0 | 0 |
| | Totals | 6 | 0 | 0 |
