= 1965 All England Open Badminton Championships =

1965 All England Championships
Tournament details
- Dates: 24 March 1965– 28 March 1965
- Edition: 55th
- Venue: Wembley Arena
- Location: London

The 1965 All England Championships was a badminton tournament held at Wembley Arena, London, England, from 24 to 28 March 1965.

Lee Kin Tat represented Singapore following their independence, having previously represented Malaysia. The former Ulla Rasmussen was now competing under her married name of Ulla Strand.

== Final results ==
Category	Winners	Runners-up	Score
Men's singles	(Denmark) Erland Kops	(Malaysia) Tan Aik Huang	15–13, 15–12
Women's singles	(England) Ursula Smith	(Denmark) Ulla Strand	11–7, 11–7
Men's doubles	(Malaysia) Ng Boon Bee & Tan Yee Khan	(Denmark) Erland Kops & (Malaysia) Oon Chong Jin	15–7, 15–5
Women's doubles	(Denmark) Karin Jørgensen & Ulla Strand	(England) Jenny Pritchard & Ursula Smith	15–10, 15–0
Mixed doubles	(Denmark) Finn Kobberø & Ulla Strand	(England) Tony Jordan & Jenny Pritchard	9–15, 15–4, 15–12

== Men's singles ==
=== Section 1 ===
Round of 32
(Denmark) Erland Kops +	15	15
(Canada) Wayne MacDonnell	3	7
(India) Suresh Goel	15	15
(South Africa) William Kerr	8	5
(Malaysia) Ng Seow Meng +	15	15
(England) Colin Beacom	2	11
(Denmark) Morten Pommergaard	15	15
(Sweden) Bengt Ake Jonsson	7	10
(Denmark) Svend Andersen Pri	15	15
(England) Tony Pears	9	7
(West Germany) Friedhelm Wulff	8	17	15
(Sweden) Goran Wahlqvist	15	14	8
(Japan) Takeshi Miyanaga	15	15
(Thailand) Soomsook Boonyasukhanonda +	0	4
(Malaysia) Yew Cheng Hoe	15	15
(New Zealand) Richard Purser	4	8

Round of 16
(Denmark) Kops	15	15
(India) Goel	5	2
(Malaysia) Seow Meng	15	15
(Denmark) Pommergaard	5	9
(Denmark) Andersen Pri	15	15
(West Germany) Wulff	5	10
(Japan) Miyanaga	15	15
(Malaysia) Yew Cheng	5	8

Quarter-finals
(Denmark) Kops	18	15
(Malaysia) Seow Meng	16	2
(Denmark) Andersen Pri	15	17
(Japan) Miyanaga	7	14

Semi-finals
(Denmark) Kops	15	15
(Denmark) Andersen Pri	12	4

=== Section 2 ===
Round of 32
(Malaysia) Tan Aik Huang +	12	15	15
(Thailand) Narong Bhornchima	15	3	6
(Denmark) Jorgen Mortensen	11	15	15
(Sweden) Willi Lund	15	9	6
(Denmark) Knud Aage Nielsen +	15	15
(Malaysia) Ng Boon Bee	7	11
(South Africa) Alan Parsons	12	15	17
(West Germany) Wolfgang Bouchow	15	6	15
(Thailand) Channarong Ratanaseangsuang +	8	15	15
(Denmark) Bendt Rose	15	4	6
(Malaysia) Tan Yee Khan	15	15
(England) David Horton	1	2
(Singapore) Lee Kin Tat	15	15
(West Germany) Franz Beinvogel	14	11
(Sweden) Kurt Johnsson	15	15
(Denmark) Henning Borch +	6	7

Round of 16
(Malaysia) Aik Huang	15	15
(Denmark) Mortensen	5	10
(Denmark) Nielsen	15	15
(South Africa) Parsons	4	7
(Thailand) Channarong	15	7	15
(Malaysia) Tan Yee Khan	7	15	13
(Singapore) Tat	15	15
(Sweden) Johnsson	9	9

Quarter-finals
(Malaysia) Aik Huang	15	8	15
(Denmark) Nielsen	1	15	6
(Thailand) Channarong	15	15
(Singapore) Tat	6	7

Semi-finals
(Malaysia) Aik Huang	15	15
(Thailand) Channarong	3	6

== Women's singles ==
=== Section 1 ===
Round of 32
=1	(England) Ursula Smith +	11	11
(England) Stephanie Jones	0	0
(Sweden) Gunilla Dahlstrom	11	11
(Canada) Alison Daysmith	4	3
(Denmark) Karin Jørgensen +	11	11
(England) Gillian Perrin	7	5
(West Germany) Heide Hau	12	11
(England) P M Andrew	10	4
(West Germany) Irmgard Latz	11	11
(England) Anita Price	8	4
(Netherlands) Agnes Geene	11	12
(Denmark) Pernille Mølgaard Hansen +	3	11
4	(Sweden) Eva Twedberg	11	11
(India) D Subedar	7	6
(England) Phyllis Kirkwood	11	11
(England) Sheila Ryder	8	4

Round of 16
(England) Smith	11	11
(Sweden) Dahlstrom	5	5
(Denmark) Jørgensen	6	11	11
(West Germany) Hau	11	5	3
(West Germany) Latz	11	11
(Netherlands) Geene	8	4
(Sweden) Twedberg	11	9	11
(England) Kirkwood	3	11	7

Quarter-finals
(England) Smith	11	11
(Denmark) Jørgensen	3	5
(West Germany) Latz	8	11	12
(Sweden) Twedberg	11	7	9

Semi-finals
(England) Smith	12	11
(West Germany) Latz	10	5

=== Section 2 ===
Round of 32
(Denmark) Ulla Strand +	11	11
(Denmark) Marianne Svensson	1	8
(West Germany) Marieluise Wackerow	11	6	11
(Scotland) Muriel Ferguson	4	11	7
=1	(England) Angela Bairstow	11	11
(Sweden) Ann Christine Rosenqvist	0	1
(England) M J Frost	w/o
(Netherlands) Imre Rietveld
(New Zealand) Sonya Cox +	3	11	11
(Denmark) Lonny Funch	11	1	5
(Republic of Ireland) Yvonne Kelly	1	11	11
(India) Meena Shah	11	8	5
(United States) Judy Hashman +	11	11
(Canada) Sharon Whittaker	0	5
(West Germany) Gerda Schumacher	11	11
(England) Julie Charles	2	5

Round of 16
(Denmark) Strand	11	11
(West Germany) Wackerow	8	2
(England) Bairstow	11	11
(England) Frost	3	6
(New Zealand) Cox	11	11
(Republic of Ireland) Kelly	1	4
(United States) Hashman	11	11
(West Germany) Schumacher	7	3

Quarter-finals
(Denmark) Strand	11	5	11
(England) Bairstow	5	11	4
(New Zealand) Cox	11	11
(United States) Hashman	7	5

Semi-finals
(Denmark) Strand	11	11
(New Zealand) Cox	4	7
