= 1967 All England Badminton Championships =

1967 All England Championships
Tournament details
- Dates: 15 March 1967– 19 March 1967
- Edition: 57th
- Venue: Wembley Arena
- Location: London

The 1967 All England Championships was a badminton tournament held at Wembley Arena, London, England, from 15 to 19 March 1967.

== Final results ==
Category	Winners	Runners-up	Score
Men's singles	(Denmark) Erland Kops	(Malaysia) Tan Aik Huang	15-12, 15-10
Women's singles	(United States) Judy Hashman	(Japan) Noriko Takagi	5-11, 11–8, 12-10
Men's doubles	(Denmark) Henning Borch & Erland Kops	(Denmark) Per Walsøe & Svend Andersen Pri	15-8, 15-12
Women's doubles	(Netherlands) Imre Rietveld & (Denmark) Ulla Strand	(United States) Judy Hashman & (England) Janet Brennan	11-15, 15–8, 15-4
Mixed doubles	(Denmark) Svend Andersen Pri & Ulla Strand	(Denmark) Per Walsøe & Pernille Mølgaard Hansen	15-2, 15-10

== Men's singles ==
=== Section 1 ===
Round of 32
(Denmark) Erland Kops +	15	15
(Thailand) Sila Ulao	3	4
(West Germany) Friedhelm Wulff	15	15
(England) Bill Andrew	2	6
(Sweden) Sture Johnsson +	15	15
(Netherlands) Huub Van Ginneken	12	1
(England) Ray Sharp	15	15
(England) G Deakin	1	10
(Singapore) Lee Kin Tat	15	15
(United States) Wynn Rogers	4	4
(Sweden) Kurt Johnsson	15	15
(India) Dinesh Khanna +	10	9
(Denmark) Tom Bacher	15	15
(England) S Woodley	6	10
(England) Roger Mills	15	15
(Denmark) Klaus Kaagaard	5	12

Round of 16
(Denmark) Kops	15	15
(West Germany) Wulff	3	4
(Sweden) Johnsson S	15	15
(England) Sharp	11	4
(Singapore) Kin Tat	9	18	15
(Sweden) Johnsson K	15	13	7
(Denmark) Bacher	15	18
(England) Mills	3	17

Quarter-finals
(Denmark) Kops	15	15
(Sweden) Johnsson S	3	6
(Singapore) Kin Tat	15	7	17
(Denmark) Bacher	13	17	15

Semi-finals
(Denmark) Kops	15	15
(Singapore) Kin Tat	4	4

=== Section 2 ===
Round of 32
(Malaysia) Tan Aik Huang +	15	15
(Denmark) Morten Pommergaard	7	4
(England) Paul Whetnall	15	18
(England) David Horton	3	17
(Thailand) Sangob Rattanusorn	15	15
(England) John Stanford	3	4
(South Africa) Alan Parsons +	15	18
(Denmark) Elo Hansen	13	17
(Denmark) Henning Borch	15	18
(West Germany) Wolfgang Bochow +	7	16
(England) Brian White	15	15
(England) N White	7	3
(England) Colin Beacom	15	15
(Denmark) John Kickebye	6	10
(Sweden) Willy Lund	15	15
(India) Gautam Thakkar	11	10

Round of 16
(Malaysia) Aik Huang	15	15
(England) Whetnall	4	5
(Thailand) Rattanusorn	15	15
(South Africa) Parsons	9	1
(Denmark) Borch	15	15
(England) White	7	3
(England) Beacom	10	15	15
(Sweden) Lund	15	9	1

Quarter-finals
(Malaysia) Aik Huang	15	15
(Thailand) Rattanusorn	9	2
(Denmark) Borch	15	15
(England) Beacom	4	3

Semi-finals
(Malaysia) Aik Huang	15	7	15
(Denmark) Borch	6	15	10

== Women's singles ==
=== Section 1 ===
Round of 32
=1	(United States) Judy Hashman	11	11
(Netherlands) Margot Ter Metz	0	1
(Denmark) Lizbeth von Barnekow	11	11
(Scotland) Muriel Ferguson	1	7
(West Germany) Marieluise Wackerow +	11	11
(Denmark) Marianne Svensson	2	0
(Netherlands) Agnes Geene	11	11
(England) Phyllis Kirkwood	6	4
(Denmark) Ulla Strand +	11	11
(England) E Hamilton	5	2
(Japan) Hiroe Amano	11	11
(England) P M Andrew	5	0
(Netherlands) Imre Rietveld	11	11
(England) A C Darlington	4	6
(Netherlands) Felice De Nooyer	2	11	12
(England) Gillian Perrin	11	8	10

Round of 16
(United States) Hashman	11	11
(Denmark) Von Barnekov	2	5
(West Germany) Wackerow	11	11
(Netherlands) Geene	2	2
(Denmark) Strand	11	11
(Japan) Amano	4	4
(Netherlands) Rietveld	11	11
(Netherlands) De Nooyer	3	2

Quarter-finals
(United States) Hashman	11	11
(West Germany) Wackerow	3	0
(Denmark) Strand	2	12	11
(Netherlands) Rietveld	11	10	71

Semi-finals
(United States) Hashman	11	11
(Denmark) Strand	4	6

=== Section 2 ===
Round of 32
=1	(Japan) Noriko Takagi	11	11
(New Zealand) Sonya Cox	1	0
(Denmark) Lonny Funch	11	11
(England) Margaret Boxall	7	5
(Sweden) Eva Twedberg +	11	11
(Netherlands) Marja Ridder	2	4
(South Africa) Ann Smith	w/o
(Thailand) Pratuang Pattabongse
(West Germany) Irmgard Latz +	11	11
(England) Sue Pound	0	6
(England) Julie Charles	11	11
(Republic of Ireland) Yvonne Kelly	4	0
(Denmark) Pernille Mølgaard Hansen	w/o
(India) Sunila Apte
=3	(England) Angela Bairstow	11	11
(South Africa) Wilma Prade	0	2

Round of 16
(Japan) Takagi	11	11
(Denmark) Funch	2	0
(Sweden) Twedberg	11	11
(South Africa) Smith	2	0
(West Germany) Latz	11	11
(England) Charles	1	2
(Denmark) Molegaard-Hansen	12	7	11
(England) Bairstow	9	11	9

Quarter-finals
(Japan) Takagi	11	11
(Sweden) Twedberg	9	6
(West Germany) Latz	12	11
(Denmark) Molegaard-Hansen	9	2

Semi-finals
(Japan) Takagi	11	11
(West Germany) Latz	7	2
