= Jenny Horton =

English badminton player

Personal information
- Full name: Helen Jennifer Horton
- Born: Helen Jennifer Pritchard; 1938 (age 87–88) Wandsworth, Greater London, England

Sport
- Country: England
- Sport: Badminton
Medal record
Women's badminton
Representing England
Uber Cup
Silver medal – second place	1963 Wilmington	Women's team
Commonwealth Games
Gold medal – first place	1966 Kingston	Women's doubles
Silver medal – second place	1966 Kingston	Mixed doubles

Helen Jennifer Horton (née Pritchard, born 1938) is a former English badminton player.

== Badminton career ==
Born Helen Jennifer Pritchard she first competed as Pritchard when she won the mixed doubles title at the 1964 All England Open Badminton Championships, with Tony Jordan. In addition she won the German Open in 1964.

After marrying fellow international player David Horton in 1965, she competed as Jenny Horton and won the U.S. Open Badminton Championships and the South African Championships in 1965 and from 1966 to 1968 won four titles at the Scottish Open.

Horton was selected as part of the England team that went to 1966 British Empire and Commonwealth Games and won a gold medal, with Ursula Smith in the women's doubles and a silver medal, with Tony Jordan in the mixed doubles.

== Achievements ==
=== Commonwealth Games ===
Women's doubles
Year	Venue	Partner	Opponent	Score	Result
1966	Convention Hall, Kingston, Jamaica	(England) Ursula Smith	(England) Angela Bairstow (England) Iris Rogers	15–7, 15–7	Gold

Mixed doubles
Year	Venue	Partner	Opponent	Score	Result
1966	Convention Hall, Kingston, Jamaica	(England) Tony Jordan	(England) Roger Mills (England) Angela Bairstow	15–7, 8–15, 12–15	Silver

=== International tournaments (14 titles, 13 runners-up) ===
Women's singles
Year	Tournament	Opponent	Score	Result
1966	Scottish Open	(England) Angela Bairstow	11–10, 3–11, 4–11	(silver) Runner-up

Women's doubles
Year	Tournament	Partner	Opponent	Score	Result
1961	Irish Open	(England) Ursula Smith	(Republic of Ireland) Sue Peard (Republic of Ireland) Lena Rea	15–12, 12–15, 7–15	(silver) Runner-up
1962	Dutch Open	(Netherlands) Els Robbé	(Denmark) Bente Flindt (Denmark) Ulla Rasmussen	11–15, 8–15	(silver) Runner-up
1962	Belgian International	(England) Ursula Smith	(Denmark) Karin Jørgensen (Denmark) Ulla Rasmussen	16–17, 15–7, 8–15	(silver) Runner-up
1963	Irish Open	(England) Brenda Parr	(England) Angela Bairstow (England) Iris Rogers	15–9, 15–10	(gold) Winner
1964	German Open	(England) Angela Bairstow	(West Germany) Irmgard Latz (Netherlands) Imre Rietveld	15–8, 15–8	(gold) Winner
1964	Scottish Open	(England) Angela Bairstow	(England) Margaret Barrand (England) Ursula Smith	7–15, 17–14, 15–10	(gold) Winner
1964	Dutch Open	(England) Angela Bairstow	(United States) Judy Hashman (Republic of Ireland) Sue Peard	8–15, 11–15	(silver) Runner-up
1965	All England Open	(England) Ursula Smith	(Denmark) Karin Jørgensen (Denmark) Ulla Strand	10–15, 0–15	(silver) Runner-up
1965	Irish Open	(England) Ursula Smith	(England) Margaret Barrand (England) Iris Rogers	15–8, 15–10	(gold) Winner
1965	Canadian Open	(England) Margaret Barrand	(United States) Tyna Barinaga (United States) Caroline Jensen	8–15, 10–15	(silver) Runner-up
1965	U.S. Open	(England) Margaret Barrand	(United States) Judy Hashman (Republic of Ireland) Sue Peard	15–7, 13–15, 15–11	(gold) Winner
1965	South African Championships	(England) Ursula Smith	(England) Angela Bairstow (South Africa) Sandra Bartlett	17–18, 15–11, 15–1	(gold) Winner
1966	Scottish Open	(England) Iris Rogers	(England) Angela Bairstow (England) Margaret Barrand	10–15, 9–15	(silver) Runner-up
1966	Dutch Open	(England) Heather Nielsen	(Netherlands) Agnes Geene (Netherlands) Imre Rietveld	17–14, 15–3	(gold) Winner
1967	Scottish Open	(England) Gillian Perrin	(Scotland) Catherine Dunglison (Scotland) Muriel Ferguson	15–6, 15–8	(gold) Winner
1968	Scottish Open	(England) Ursula Smith	(England) Margaret Boxall (England) Susan Pound	15–9, 15–9	(gold) Winner
1972	Scottish Open	(England) Margaret Beck	(England) Bridget Cooper (England) Gillian Gilks	15–17, 6–15	(silver) Runner-up

Mixed doubles
Year	Tournament	Partner	Opponent	Score	Result
1964	All England Open	(England) Tony Jordan	(Denmark) Finn Kobberø (Denmark) Ulla Rasmussen	15–10, 18–13	(gold) Winner
1964	Dutch Open	(England) John Havers	(England) Trevor Coates (England) Angela Bairstow	15–10, 15–6	(gold) Winner
1965	Irish Open	(England) Tony Jordan	(England) John Havers (England) Margaret Barrand	8–15, 7–15	(silver) Runner-up
1965	All England Open	(England) Tony Jordan	(Denmark) Finn Kobberø (Denmark) Ulla Strand	15–9, 4–15, 12–15	(silver) Runner-up
1965	U.S. Open	(England) Tony Jordan	(Scotland) Robert McCoig (England) Margaret Barrand	7–15, 15–12, 12–15	(silver) Runner-up
1966	Scottish Open	(England) Tony Jordan	(England) John Havers (England) Margaret Barrand	15–6, 17–16	(gold) Winner
1966	Dutch Open	(England) David Horton	(England) Paul Whetnall (England) Julie Rickard	15–3, 15–4	(gold) Winner
1967	Scottish Open	(England) David Horton	(Scotland) Robert McCoig (Scotland) M. Tait	15–6, 15–13	(gold) Winner
1971	Scottish Open	(England) Elliot Stuart	(England) Roger Mills (England) Gillian Gilks	2–15, 5–15	(silver) Runner-up
