= Anthony D. Jordan =

English badminton player (1934–2025)

Tony Jordan MBE
Personal information
- Born: 12 June 1934 Birkenhead, England
- Died: 29 May 2025 (aged 90)

Sport
- Country: England
- Sport: Badminton
Medal record
Men's badminton
Representing England
Commonwealth Games
Silver medal – second place	1966 Kingston	Mixed doubles
European Championships
Gold medal – first place	1968 Bochum	Mixed doubles
Silver medal – second place	1968 Bochum	Men's doubles

Anthony Derek Jordan MBE (12 June 1934 – 29 May 2025) was an English badminton player who won numerous international titles from the mid-1950s through the late 1960s.

== Biography ==
Known for his quick and deceptive racket work, Tony Jordan was primarily a doubles specialist with his greatest success coming in mixed doubles. Between 1956 and 1968 Jordan shared four mixed doubles titles with three different partners at the prestigious All-England Championships. He played on seven successive English Thomas Cup (men's international) teams between 1951 and 1970.

Jordan represented the England team at the 1966 British Empire and Commonwealth Games in Kingston, Jamaica, in the singles, doubles and mixed doubles events.

Jordan won the gold medal at the 1968 European Badminton Championships in mixed doubles with Susan Whetnall. He was appointed Member of the Order of the British Empire (MBE) in the 1970 Birthday Honours for services to badminton.

In his late thirties he retired from badminton, and took up golf. He was the grandfather of golfer Matthew Jordan.

Jordan died on 29 May 2025, at the age of 90.

== Achievements ==
=== Commonwealth Games ===
Mixed doubles

Year	Venue	Partner	Opponent	Score	Result
1966	Convention Hall, Kingston, Jamaica	(England) Jenny Horton	(England) Roger Mills (England) Angela Bairstow	15–7, 8–15, 12–15	Silver

=== European Championships ===
Men's doubles

Year	Venue	Partner	Opponent	Score	Result
1968	Ruhrlandhalle, Bochum, West Germany	(England) Roger Mills	(England) David Eddy (England) Roger Powell	15–7, 13–15, 5–15	Silver

Mixed doubles

Year	Venue	Partner	Opponent	Score	Result
1968	Ruhrlandhalle, Bochum, West Germany	(England) Susan Whetnall	(England) Roger Mills (England) Gillian Perrin	15–13, 15–9	Gold

=== International tournaments (29 titles, 32 runners-up) ===
Men's singles

Year	Tournament	Opponent	Score	Result
1955	Irish Open	(England) John D. McColl	10–15, 15–13, 15–4	(gold) Winner
1956	Scottish Open	(England) John D. McColl	0–15, 14–17	(silver) Runner-up
1958	Scottish Open	(Malaysia) Oon Chong Jin	7–15, 5–15	(silver) Runner-up
1958	Welsh International	(England) Hugh Findlay	9–15, 7–15	(silver) Runner-up
1961	Irish Open	(England) Trevor Coates	15–7, 10–15, 9–15	(silver) Runner-up

Men's doubles

Year	Tournament	Partner	Opponent	Score	Result
1954	Scottish Open	(England) John D. McColl	(New Zealand) Jeffrey Robson (England) Tom Wingfield	15–10, 15–10	(gold) Winner
1955	Irish Open	(England) John D. McColl	(England) John Best (England) Warwick Shute	6–15, 10–15	(silver) Runner-up
1956	Scottish Open	(England) John D. McColl	(England) John Best (England) Warwick Shute	18–13, 10–15, 10–15	(silver) Runner-up
1957	Irish Open	(England) John Best	(Malaysia) Eddy Choong (Malaysia) Oon Chong Teik	7–15, 8–15	(silver) Runner-up
1958	Welsh International	(England) Hugh Findlay	(England) Kenneth Derrick (England) A. R. V. Dolman	15–7, 15–8	(gold) Winner
1959	Irish Open	(England) Ronald Lockwood	(England) Hugh Findlay (England) Peter Waddell	12–15, 17–14, 15–4	(gold) Winner
1961	Swedish Open	(England) Peter Waddell	(England) Hugh Findlay (England) Ronald Lockwood	8–15, 18–6, 17–15	(gold) Winner
1961	Irish Open	(England) Trevor Coates	(England) Hugh Findlay (England) Ronald Lockwood	9–15, 10–15	(silver) Runner-up
1961	German Open	(England) Hugh Findlay	(Malaysia) Oon Chong Teik (Malaysia) Yeoh Kean Hua	15–4, 15–2	(gold) Winner
1963	Irish Open	(England) Peter Waddell	(England) Trevor Coates (England) Hugh Findlay	15–10, 15–10	(gold) Winner
1963	Dutch Open	(England) Hugh Findlay	(Denmark) Henning Borch (Denmark) Jørgen Mortensen	15–11, 15–17, 9–15	(silver) Runner-up
1965	Irish Open	(England) Colin Beacom	(England) Roger Mills (England) David Horton	15–12, 9–15, 10–15	(silver) Runner-up
1965	Dutch Open	(England) Colin Beacom	(Denmark) Klaus Kaagaard (Denmark) Ole Mertz	4–15, 7–15	(silver) Runner-up
1965	U.S. Open	(Scotland) Robert McCoig	(Denmark) Erland Kops (Denmark) Knud Aage Nielsen	5–15, 15–12, 15–11	(gold) Winner
1966	German Open	(England) David Horton	(Denmark) Poul-Erik Nielsen (Denmark) Per Walsøe	4–15, 5–15	(silver) Runner-up
1967	Scottish Open	(England) David Horton	(Scotland) Robert McCoig (Scotland) Mac Henderson	7–15, 6–15	(silver) Runner-up
1967	Irish Open	(England) Colin Beacom	(England) Roger Mills (England) David Horton	8–15, 15–3, 15–18	(silver) Runner-up
1968	Scottish Open	(England) David Horton	(England) David Eddy (England) Roger Powell	15–11, 6–15, 5–15	(silver) Runner-up
1969	Swedish Open	(England) Roger Mills	(Denmark) Erland Kops (Denmark) Svend Pri	13–15, 15–8, 11–15	(silver) Runner-up
1969	Irish Open	(England) Roger Mills	(England) David Eddy (England) Roger Powell	8–15, 8–15	(silver) Runner-up
1969	Canadian Open	(Scotland) Robert McCoig	(Indonesia) Tan Joe Hok (Thailand) Charoen Wattanasin	15–7, 15–6	(gold) Winner

Mixed doubles

Year	Tournament	Partner	Opponent	Score	Result
1952	Scottish Open	(England) Elisabeth O'Beirne	(Malaysia) Johnny Heah (England) Joy Saunders	10–15, 15–12, 10–15	(silver) Runner-up
1954	Scottish Open	(England) June White	(England) John Best (England) Iris Cooley	14–18, 15–2, 15–9	(gold) Winner
1955	Scottish Open	(England) June Timperley	(England) John Best (England) Iris Cooley	7–15, 15–3, 10–15	(silver) Runner-up
1955	Irish Open	(England) June Timperley	(England) John D. McColl (England) Audrey Stone	15–3, 15–10	(gold) Winner
1956	Scottish Open	(England) June Timperley	(England) John Best (England) Iris Rogers	12–15, 15–10, 15–8	(gold) Winner
1956	All England Open	(England) June Timperley	(Denmark) Jørgen Hammergaard Hansen (Denmark) Anni Jorgensen	18–15, 6–15, 15–8	(gold) Winner
1957	Swedish Open	(England) June Timperley	(England) John Best (England) Iris Rogers	17–14, 15–3	(gold) Winner
1957	Irish Open	(England) June Timperley	(England) John Best (England) Iris Rogers	11–15, 18–17, 15–6	(gold) Winner
1958	Scottish Open	(England) June Timperley	(England) John Best (England) Iris Rogers	9–15, 8–15	(silver) Runner-up
1958	All England Open	(England) June Timperley	(Denmark) Finn Kobberø (Denmark) Aase Winther	15–9, 7–15, 15–5	(gold) Winner
1958	Welsh International	(England) P. E. Broad	(England) Hugh Findlay (England) Heather Ward	11–15, 7–15	(silver) Runner-up
1959	Irish Open	(England) June Timperley	(England) Ronald Lockwood (England) Iris Rogers	15–10, 15–7	(gold) Winner
1960	Scottish Open	(England) June Timperley	(England) Ronald Lockwood (England) Audrey Marshall	15–5, 15–12	(gold) Winner
1961	Irish Open	(England) June Timperley	(England) Trevor Coates (England) Ursula Smith	15–10, 15–2	(gold) Winner
1961	All England Open	(England) June Timperley	(Denmark) Finn Kobberø (Denmark) Kirsten Thorndahl	12–15, 5–15	(silver) Runner-up
1963	Swedish Open	(England) June Timperley	(Denmark) Poul-Erik Nielsen (Denmark) Ulla Rasmussen	15–9, 3–15, 4–15	(silver) Runner-up
1963	Dutch Open	(South Africa) J. Cerff	(Denmark) Hans Henrik Svendsen (Denmark) Anne Flindt	15–11, 11–15, 11–15	(silver) Runner-up
1963	All England Open	(England) June Timperley	(Denmark) Finn Kobberø (Denmark) Ulla Rasmussen	8–15, 12–15	(silver) Runner-up
1964	Scottish Open	(England) Patricia Page	(Scotland) Mac Henderson (Scotland) Catherine Dunglison	15–12, 9–15, 15–7	(gold) Winner
1964	All England Open	(England) Jenny Pritchard	(Denmark) Finn Kobberø (Denmark) Ulla Rasmussen	15–10, 18–13	(gold) Winner
1965	Irish Open	(England) Jenny Horton	(England) John Havers (England) Margaret Barrand	8–15, 7–15	(silver) Runner-up
1965	Dutch Open	(England) Angela Bairstow	(England) John Havers (England) Anita Price	15–4, 18–14	(gold) Winner
1965	All England Open	(England) Jenny Horton	(Denmark) Finn Kobberø (Denmark) Ulla Strand	15–9, 4–15, 12–15	(silver) Runner-up
1965	U.S. Open	(England) Jenny Horton	(Scotland) Robert McCoig (England) Margaret Barrand	7–15, 15–12, 12–15	(silver) Runner-up
1966	Scottish Open	(England) Jenny Horton	(England) John Havers (England) Margaret Barrand	15–6, 17–16	(gold) Winner
1967	Irish Open	(England) Angela Bairstow	(England) Roger Mills (England) Iris Rogers	5–15, 11–15	(silver) Runner-up
1967	German Open	(England) Angela Bairstow	(Denmark) Per Walsøe (Denmark) Ulla Strand	8–15, 8–15	(silver) Runner-up
1967	Dutch Open	(England) Angela Bairstow	(Denmark) Klaus Kaagaard (Denmark) Pernille Mølgaard Hansen	15–2, 15–11	(gold) Winner
1968	Scottish Open	(England) Susan Pound	(Scotland) Robert McCoig (Scotland) Muriel Ferguson	15–8, 17–15	(gold) Winner
1968	German Open	(England) Susan Pound	(Denmark) Per Walsøe (Denmark) Pernille Mølgaard Hansen	15–10, 18–17	(gold) Winner
1968	All England Open	(England) Susan Pound	(Scotland) Robert McCoig (Scotland) Muriel Ferguson	15–6, 15–6	(gold) Winner
1969	Irish Open	(England) Susan Whetnall	(England) Roger Mills (England) Gillian Perrin	15–14, 15–13	(gold) Winner
1969	German Open	(England) Susan Whetnall	(Denmark) Per Walsøe (Denmark) Pernille Mølgaard Hansen	15–11, 13–15, 15–10	(gold) Winner
1969	All England Open	(England) Susan Whetnall	(England) Roger Mills (England) Gillian Perrin	15–9, 5–15, 12–15	(silver) Runner-up
1969	South African Championships	(England) Susan Whetnall	(England) Derek Talbot (England) Gillian Perrin	10–15, 13–15	(silver) Runner-up
