= Ursula Smith =

English badminton player

Personal information
- Born: 1934 (age 91–92)

Sport
- Country: England
- Sport: Badminton
Medal record
Women's badminton
Representing England
Uber Cup
Silver medal – second place	1963 Wilmington	Women's team
Commonwealth Games
Gold medal – first place	1966 Kingston	Women's doubles
Bronze medal – third place	1966 Kingston	Women's singles
Asian Championships
Gold medal – first place	1965 Lucknow	Women's doubles
Silver medal – second place	1965 Lucknow	Women's singles
Silver medal – second place	1965 Lucknow	Mixed doubles

Ursula Honour Smith married name Oakley (born 1934) is a former English international badminton player.

== Early life ==
She lived at 'Fernleigh' 15 Brunswick Sq Herne Bay Kent from age of ten. She attended La Sainte Union RC school in Herne Bay. She attended the University of Southampton, where she played for the university badminton team, winning the UAU championship in December 1952 in the Victory Hall of Loughborough College. In 1956 she worked at St George's Hospital when at The Lanesborough at Hyde Park Corner, as a nurse. She visited France for 12 months in 1955 to learn French.

== Badminton career ==
Smith was a winner of the All England Open Badminton Championships. She won the 1965 All England Open Badminton Championships women's singles.

Smith competed for the England team in the 1966 British Empire and Commonwealth Games in Kingston, Jamaica, winning the gold medal in the women's doubles and bronze medal in the singles. She represented Herne Bay and Kent.

== Personal life ==
Smith has lived in South Africa since her marriage and then represented Transvaal on the squash court in provincial tournaments.

== Achievements ==
=== Commonwealth Games ===
Women's singles
Year	Venue	Opponent	Score	Result
1966	Convention Hall, Kingston, Jamaica	(England) Jenny Horton	11–8, 11–1	Bronze

Women's doubles
Year	Venue	Partner	Opponent	Score	Result
1966	Convention Hall, Kingston, Jamaica	(England) Jenny Horton	(England) Angela Bairstow (England) Iris Rogers	15–7, 15–7	Gold

=== Asian Championships ===
Women's singles
Year	Venue	Opponent	Score	Result
1965	Lucknow, India	(England) Angela Bairstow	6–11, 4–11	Silver

Women's doubles
Year	Venue	Partner	Opponent	Score	Result
1965	Lucknow, India	(England) Angela Bairstow	(Malaysia) Rosalind Singha Ang (Malaysia) Teoh Siew Yong	18–13, 15–11	Gold

Mixed doubles
Year	Venue	Partner	Opponent	Score	Result
1965	Lucknow, India	(Thailand) Chavalert Chumkum	(Malaysia) Tan Yee Khan (England) Angela Bairstow	15–6, 3–15, 2–15	Silver

=== International tournaments (17 titles, 15 runners-up) ===
Women's singles
Year	Tournament	Opponent	Score	Result
1960	French Open	(England) Rita A. Rabey	5–11, 11–12	(silver) Runner-up
1961	All England Open	(United States) Judy Hashman	2–11, 6–11	(silver) Runner-up
1961	Irish Open	(Republic of Ireland) Mary O'Sullivan	11–7, 11–5	(gold) Winner
1962	All England Open	(United States) Judy Hashman	4–11, 0–11	(silver) Runner-up
1962	Scottish Open	(Scotland) Muriel Ferguson	11–3, 11–1	(gold) Winner
1962	Irish Open	(Republic of Ireland) Mary O'Sullivan	12–10, 11–4	(gold) Winner
1962	Belgian International	(Denmark) Karin Jørgensen	8–11, 12–10, 11–2	(gold) Winner
1963	Swedish Open	(Sweden) Gunilla Dahlström	11–7, 11–4	(gold) Winner
1963	Irish Open	(Republic of Ireland) Mary O'Sullivan	11–2, 11–3	(gold) Winner
1963	U.S. Open	(United States) Judy Hashman	6–11, 3–11	(silver) Runner-up
1964	All England Open	(United States) Judy Hashman	0–11, 3–11	(silver) Runner-up
1964	Scottish Open	(England) Angela Bairstow	11–4, 11–2	(gold) Winner
1965	German Open	(West Germany) Irmgard Latz	7–11, 11–3, 11–2	(gold) Winner
1965	All England Open	(Denmark) Ulla Strand	11–7, 11–7	(gold) Winner
1965	Irish Open	(England) Angela Bairstow	6–11, 9–12	(silver) Runner-up
1965	South African Championships	(England) Heather Nielsen	11–5, 11–4	(gold) Winner
1968	Scottish Open	(Scotland) Muriel Ferguson	11–8, 11–7	(gold) Winner

Women's doubles
Year	Tournament	Partner	Opponent	Score	Result
1960	French Open	(England) Audrey Stone	(Belgium) Bep Verstoep (Indonesia) Yvonne Theresia Sonneville	15–3, 15–8	(gold) Winner
1961	Irish Open	(England) Jenny Pritchard	(Republic of Ireland) Sue Peard (Republic of Ireland) Lena Rea	15–12, 12–15, 7–15	(silver) Runner-up
1962	Scottish Open	(England) Margaret Barrand	(England) Jenny Pritchard (England) Iris Rogers	18–14, 10–15, 15–1	(gold) Winner
1962	Irish Open	(Scotland) Sheila McCoig	(Republic of Ireland) Yvonne Kelly (Republic of Ireland) Mary O'Sullivan	15–12, 8–15, 8–15	(silver) Runner-up
1962	Belgian International	(England) Jenny Pritchard	(Denmark) Karin Jørgensen (Denmark) Ulla Rasmussen	16–17, 15–7, 8–15	(silver) Runner-up
1963	Swedish Open	(England) June Timperley	(Denmark) Karin Jørgensen (Denmark) Ulla Rasmussen	2–15, 14–18	(silver) Runner-up
1963	U.S. Open	(England) Margaret Barrand	(United States) Judy Hashman (Republic of Ireland) Sue Peard	6–15, 5–15	(silver) Runner-up
1964	Scottish Open	(England) Margaret Barrand	(England) Angela Bairstow (England) Jenny Pritchard	15–7, 14–17, 10–15	(silver) Runner-up
1965	German Open	(England) Brenda Parr	(England) Susan Pound (England) Veronica Brock	15–5, 17–16	(gold) Winner
1965	All England Open	(England) Jenny Pritchard	(Denmark) Karin Jørgensen (Denmark) Ulla Strand	10–15, 0–15	(silver) Runner-up
1965	Irish Open	(England) Jenny Pritchard	(England) Margaret Barrand (England) Iris Rogers	15–8, 15–10	(gold) Winner
1965	South African Championships	(England) Jenny Pritchard	(England) Angela Bairstow (South Africa) Sandra Bartlett	17–18, 15–11, 15–1	(gold) Winner
1966	U.S. Open	(Denmark) Ulla Strand	(United States) Judy Hashman (Republic of Ireland) Sue Peard	5–15, 5–15	(silver) Runner-up
1968	Scottish Open	(England) Jenny Horton	(England) Margaret Boxall (England) Susan Pound	15–9, 15–9	(gold) Winner

Mixed doubles
Year	Tournament	Partner	Opponent	Score	Result
1961	Irish Open	(England) Trevor Coates	(England) Tony Jordan (England) June Timperley	10–15, 2–15	(silver) Runner-up
