= Karin Jørgensen =

Danish badminton player

Personal information
- Born: Karin Rasmussen
- Died: 2014

Sport
- Country: Denmark
- Sport: Badminton
- Retired: 1972
Medal record
Women's badminton
Representing Denmark
European Championships
Bronze medal – third place	1970 Port Talbot	Women's doubles

Karin Jørgensen (née Rasmussen) was a Danish badminton player. She won nine National Danish titles and five Nordic titles in addition to playing for the national team 28 times from 1961 to 1972. However, she was best known for her All England title successes with her sister Ulla Strand née Rasmussen. The pair won the doubles in 1964 and 1965. They also lost three finals in 1962, 1963 and 1966 against Judy Hashman who played either with another Dane, Tonny Holst-Christensen or with her own sister Sue Peard.

== Achievements ==
=== European Championships ===
Women's doubles
Year	Venue	Partner	Opponent	Score	Result
1970	Afan Lido, Port Talbot, Wales	(Denmark) Anne Berglund	(England) Margaret Boxall (England) Susan Whetnall	10–15, 8–15	Bronze

=== International tournaments (15 titles, 25 runners-up) ===
Women's singles
Year	Tournament	Opponent	Score	Result
1959	Dutch Open	(Denmark) Inger Kjærgaard	11–7, 11–5	(gold) Winner
1960	German Open	(Sweden) Eva Petterson	11–4, 1–11, 5–11	(silver) Runner-up
1962	Swedish Open	(Denmark) Ulla Rasmussen	3–11, 11–5, 4–11	(silver) Runner-up
1962	Belgian International	(England) Ursula Smith	11–8, 10–12, 2–11	(silver) Runner-up
1962	Nordic Championships	(Sweden) Eva Petterson	11–1, 11–3	(gold) Winner

Women's doubles
Year	Tournament	Partner	Opponent	Score	Result
1959	German Open	(Denmark) Annette Schmidt	(Denmark) Agnete Friis (Denmark) Aase Schiøtt Jacobsen	12–15, 6–15	(silver) Runner-up
1960	German Open	(Denmark) Annette Schmidt	(Denmark) Agnete Friis (Denmark) Inger Kjærgaard	13–15, 6–15	(silver) Runner-up
1961	Dutch Open	(Denmark) Hanne Jansen	(Denmark) Inger Kjærgaard (Denmark) Annette Schmidt	15–10, 15–6	(gold) Winner
1962	German Open	(Denmark) Ulla Rasmussen	(United States) Judy Hashman (Denmark) Tonny Holst-Christensen	12–15, 9–15	(silver) Runner-up
1962	All England Open	(Denmark) Ulla Rasmussen	(United States) Judy Hashman (Denmark) Tonny Holst-Christensen	5–15, 3–15	(silver) Runner-up
1962	Swedish Open	(Denmark) Ulla Rasmussen	(Denmark) Bente Kristiansen (Denmark) Aase Winther	15–10, 15–18, 4–15	(silver) Runner-up
1962	Belgian International	(Denmark) Ulla Rasmussen	(England) Ursula Smith (England) Jenny Pritchard	17–16, 7–15, 15–8	(gold) Winner
1962	Nordic Championships	(Denmark) Ulla Rasmussen	(Sweden) Eva Petterson (Sweden) Gunilla Dahlström	15–5, 15–6	(gold) Winner
1963	German Open	(Denmark) Ulla Rasmussen	(United States) Judy Hashman (Republic of Ireland) Sue Peard	15–8, 15–10	(gold) Winner
1963	All England Open	(Denmark) Ulla Rasmussen	(United States) Judy Hashman (Republic of Ireland) Sue Peard	6–15, 9–15	(silver) Runner-up
1963	Swedish Open	(Denmark) Ulla Rasmussen	(England) Ursula Smith (England) June Timperley	15–2, 18–14	(gold) Winner
1963	Nordic Championships	(Denmark) Ulla Rasmussen	(Denmark) Anne Flindt (Denmark) Bente Flindt	6–15, 15–4, 15–9	(gold) Winner
1964	All England Open	(Denmark) Ulla Rasmussen	(United States) Judy Hashman (Republic of Ireland) Sue Peard	15–11, 6–15, 15–10	(gold) Winner
1964	Swedish Open	(Denmark) Ulla Rasmussen	(United States) Judy Hashman (Republic of Ireland) Mary O'Sullivan	7–15, 3–15	(silver) Runner-up
1964	Nordic Championships	(Denmark) Ulla Rasmussen	(Denmark) Pernille Mølgaard Hansen (Denmark) Lizbeth von Barnekow	11–14, 14–18	(silver) Runner-up
1965	All England Open	(Denmark) Ulla Strand	(England) Jenny Pritchard (England) Ursula Smith	15–10, 15–0	(gold) Winner
1965	Swedish Open	(Denmark) Ulla Strand	(Sweden) Eva Twedberg (Sweden) Gunilla Dahlström	15–1, 15–4	(gold) Winner
1965	Nordic Championships	(Denmark) Ulla Strand	(Sweden) Eva Twedberg (Sweden) Gunilla Dahlström	15–9, 15–4	(gold) Winner
1966	German Open	(Denmark) Ulla Strand	(United States) Judy Hashman (Republic of Ireland) Sue Peard	7–15, 3–15	(silver) Runner-up
1966	All England Open	(Denmark) Ulla Strand	(United States) Judy Hashman (Republic of Ireland) Sue Peard	5–15, 17–14, 12–15	(silver) Runner-up
1966	Swedish Open	(Denmark) Ulla Strand	(United States) Judy Hashman (Sweden) Eva Twedberg	15–12, 10–15, 8–15	(silver) Runner-up
1966	Denmark Open	(Denmark) Ulla Strand	(Netherlands) Imre Rietveld (England) Heather Ward	15–4, 15–12	(gold) Winner
1966	Nordic Championships	(Denmark) Ulla Strand	(Sweden) Eva Twedberg (Sweden) Gunilla Dahlström	15–9, 15–6	(gold) Winner
1968	Denmark Open	(Denmark) Ulla Strand	(Japan) Hiroe Amano (Japan) Noriko Takagi	11–15, 11–15	(silver) Runner-up
1968	Nordic Championships	(Denmark) Ulla Strand	(Denmark) Anne Flindt (Denmark) Pernille Mølgaard Hansen	6–15, 11–15	(silver) Runner-up
1969	Norwegian International	(Denmark) Jette Føge	(Sweden) Eva Twedberg (Sweden) Lena Olsson	15–4, 15–4	(gold) Winner
1971	Dutch Open	(Denmark) Ulla Strand	(England) Gillian Gilks (England) Judy Hashman	6–15, 2–15	(silver) Runner-up
1971	Nordic Championships	(Denmark) Ulla Strand	(Denmark) Anne Flindt (Denmark) Pernille Kaagaard	walkover	(silver) Runner-up
1973	Denmark Open	(Denmark) Ulla Strand	(Netherlands) Marjan Luesken (Netherlands) Joke van Beusekom	14–17, 14–17	(silver) Runner-up

Mixed doubles
Year	Tournament	Partner	Opponent	Score	Result
1959	Dutch Open	(Denmark) Arne Rasmussen	(Denmark) Ole Mertz (Denmark) Inger Kjærgaard	11–15, 15–6, 5–15	(silver) Runner-up
1962	Belgian International	(Denmark) Jørgen Hammergaard Hansen	(Denmark) Finn Kobberø (Denmark) Ulla Rasmussen	15–6, 10–15, 6–15	(silver) Runner-up
1963	Nordic Championships	(Denmark) Ole Mertz	(Denmark) Henning Borch (Denmark) Ulla Rasmussen	13–15, 8–15	(silver) Runner-up
1966	Nordic Championships	(Denmark) Henning Borch	(Denmark) Per Walsøe (Denmark) Ulla Strand	1–15, 9–15	(silver) Runner-up
1968	Nordic Championships	(Denmark) Elo Hansen	(Denmark) Poul-Erik Nielsen (Denmark) Pernille Mølgaard Hansen	10–15, 15–17, 9–15	(silver) Runner-up
1970	Swedish Open	(Denmark) Elo Hansen	(Denmark) Per Walsøe (Denmark) Pernille Mølgaard Hansen	15–3, 5–15, 8–15	(silver) Runner-up
