= Margaret Barrand =

English badminton player

Personal information
- Born: Margaret Semple; 1940 (age 85–86) Leyland, Lancashire, England

Sport
- Country: England
- Sport: Badminton
Medal record
Women's badminton
Representing England
Uber Cup
Silver medal – second place	1963 Wilmington	Women's team

Margaret Barrand (née Margaret Semple) (born 1940) is a former English badminton international player and a former national champion.

== Biography ==
Barrand became an English National doubles champion after winning the English National Badminton Championships mixed doubles title with Roger Mills in 1965. The following year she won the women's doubles with Angela Bairstow. She was a member of the 1963 English Uber Cup team which finished second to the United States in a tight four matches to three final. Her most impressive badminton accomplishment, perhaps, was winning mixed doubles at the U.S. Open Badminton Championships in three successive years (1963, 1964, and 1965), each time with a different partner ( in order: Sangob Rattanusorn, Channarong Ratanaseangsuang, and Bob McCoig). She also won the 1965 Canadian Open mixed doubles with McCoig and the 1965 U.S Open women's doubles with Jennifer Pritchard Horton.

She represented Lancashire and England and played under the name of Semple until she married a vicar called George Barrand in 1958, playing thereafter as Barrand. Margaret retired after her son, Timothy is born. After retiring, Margaret moved to Australia with her husband being appointed as a Rector in Moss Vale parish.

== Achievements ==
=== International tournaments (9 titles, 5 runners-up) ===
Women's doubles
Year	Tournament	Partner	Opponent	Score	Result
1962	Scottish Open	(England) Ursula Smith	(England) Jenny Pritchard (England) Iris Rogers	18–14, 10–15, 15–1	(gold) Winner
1963	U.S. Open	(England) Ursula Smith	(United States) Judy Hashman (Republic of Ireland) Sue Peard	6–15, 7–15	(silver) Runner-up
1964	Scottish Open	(England) Ursula Smith	(England) Angela Bairstow (England) Jenny Pritchard	15–7, 14–17, 10–15	(silver) Runner-up
1965	Irish Open	(England) Iris Rogers	(England) Ursula Smith (England) Jenny Pritchard	8–15, 10–15	(silver) Runner-up
1965	Canadian Open	(England) Jenny Horton	(United States) Tyna Barinaga (United States) Caroline Jensen	8–15, 10–15	(silver) Runner-up
1965	U.S. Open	(England) Jenny Horton	(United States) Judy Hashman (Republic of Ireland) Sue Peard	15–7, 13–15, 15–11	(gold) Winner
1966	Scottish Open	(England) Angela Bairstow	(England) Jenny Horton (England) Iris Rogers	15–10, 15–9	(gold) Winner

Mixed doubles
Year	Tournament	Partner	Opponent	Score	Result
1963	Irish Open	(England) Kenneth Derrick	(England) W. C. E. Rogers (England) Iris Rogers	15–9, 4–15, 15–11	(gold) Winner
1963	U.S. Open	(Thailand) Sangob Rattanusorn	(United States) Joe Alston (United States) Lois Alston	18–16, 4–15, 15–12	(gold) Winner
1964	U.S. Open	(Thailand) Channarong Ratanaseangsuang	(United States) Joe Alston (United States) Lois Alston	walkover	(gold) Winner
1965	Canadian Open	(Scotland) Bob McCoig	(Canada) Rolf Paterson (Canada) Mimi Nilsson	15–11, 15–7	(gold) Winner
1965	U.S. Open	(Scotland) Bob McCoig	(England) Tony Jordan (England) Jenny Horton	15–7, 12–15, 15–12	(gold) Winner
1965	Irish Open	(England) John Havers	(England) Tony Jordan (England) Jenny Horton	15–8, 15–7	(gold) Winner
1966	Scottish Open	(England) John Havers	(England) Tony Jordan (England) Jenny Horton	6–15, 16–17	(silver) Runner-up
