= Ulla Strand =

Danish badminton player

Personal information
- Born: Ulla Rasmussen; 21 March 1943 Copenhagen, Denmark
- Died: 7 August 2007 (aged 64)

Sport
- Country: Denmark
- Sport: Badminton

Women's and Mixed doubles
- Career title: 10 times All England Champion
Medal record
Women's badminton
Representing Denmark
European Championships
Bronze medal – third place	1974 Vienna	Women's doubles
European Mixed Team Championships
Silver medal – second place	1974 Vienna	Mixed team

Ulla Strand (21 March 1943 – 7 August 2007), born as Ulla Rasmussen, was badminton player of Denmark who excelled from the early 1960s to the early 1970s. Though she won three Danish national singles titles and reached the women's singles final at the All-England Championships in 1965, most of her major championship victories were in doubles (often with her sister Karin Jorgensen) and mixed doubles. Attractive and charismatic, she was a crowd favorite throughout her career.

She was included in the Badminton Hall of Fame in 1999. Ulla Strand died in 2007 after a long illness.

== Career ==
Strand won 10 All England Open Badminton Championships titles, 7 in mixed doubles and 3 in women's doubles. She also won 21 Danish National Championships between 1961 and 1974, and 19 Nordic Championships between 1962 and 1973.

=== 1972 Summer Olympics ===
Strand competed in badminton at the 1972 Summer Olympics, as a demonstration sport competition. In women's singles, she lost in the first round against Noriko Nakayama, 11–5, 11–9. In mixed doubles she played with Svend Pri, and they were beaten in the final by Derek Talbot and Gillian Gilks of Great Britain, 15–6, 18–16.

== Achievements ==
=== Olympic Games (demonstration) ===
Mixed doubles
Year	Venue	Partner	Opponent	Score	Result
1972	Volleyballhalle, Munich, West Germany	(Denmark) Svend Pri	(United Kingdom) Derek Talbot (United Kingdom) Gillian Gilks	6–15, 16–18	Silver

=== European Championships ===
Women's doubles
Year	Venue	Partner	Opponent	Score	Result
1974	Stadthalle, Vienna, Austria	(Denmark) Pernille Kaagaard	(England) Nora Gardner (England) Susan Whetnall	8–15, 12–15	Bronze

=== International tournaments (55 titles, 40 runners-up) ===
Women's singles
Year	Tournament	Opponent	Score	Result
1962	Swedish Open	(Denmark) Karin Jørgensen	11–3, 5–11, 11–4	(gold) Winner
1963	Nordic Championships	(Denmark) Anne Flindt	11–7, 11–3	(gold) Winner
1963	German Open	(United States) Judy Hashman	10–12, 9–12	(silver) Runner-up
1964	Nordic Championships	(Denmark) Pernille Mølgaard Hansen	11–8, 11–3	(gold) Winner
1964	German Open	(United States) Judy Hashman	2–11, 3–11	(silver) Runner-up
1964	Swedish Open	(United States) Judy Hashman	10–12, 3–11	(silver) Runner-up
1965	All England Open	(England) Ursula Smith	7–11, 7–11	(silver) Runner-up
1965	Nordic Championships	(Sweden) Eva Twedberg	8–11, 12–10, 12–10	(gold) Winner
1965	Swedish Open	(Sweden) Eva Twedberg	11–2, 1–11, 4–11	(silver) Runner-up
1966	Canadian Open	(United States) Judy Hashman	7–11, 7–11	(silver) Runner-up
1966	Nordic Championships	(Sweden) Eva Twedberg	11–5, 11–6	(gold) Winner
1966	Denmark Open	(Denmark) Lizbeth von Barnekow	4–11, 6–11	(silver) Runner-up
1967	Swedish Open	(Netherlands) Imre Rietveld	11–6, 4–11, 11–6	(gold) Winner
1967	German Open	(Sweden) Eva Twedberg	2–11, 6–11	(silver) Runner-up
1967	Norwegian International	(Sweden) Eva Twedberg	11–3, 8–11, 3–11	(silver) Runner-up
1967	Nordic Championships	(Sweden) Eva Twedberg	3–11, 2–11	(silver) Runner-up
1968	Swedish Open	(Sweden) Eva Twedberg	2–11, 0–11	(silver) Runner-up
1968	Nordic Championships	(Denmark) Jette Føge	9–12, 10–12	(silver) Runner-up

Women's doubles
Year	Tournament	Partner	Opponent	Score	Result
1962	German Open	(Denmark) Karin Jørgensen	(United States) Judy Hashman (Denmark) Tonny Holst-Christensen	12–15, 9–15	(silver) Runner-up
1962	All England Open	(Denmark) Karin Jørgensen	(United States) Judy Hashman (Denmark) Tonny Holst-Christensen	5–15, 3–15	(silver) Runner-up
1962	Swedish Open	(Denmark) Karin Jørgensen	(Denmark) Bente Kristiansen (Denmark) Aase Winther	15–10, 15–18, 4–15	(silver) Runner-up
1962	Nordic Championships	(Denmark) Karin Jørgensen	(Sweden) Eva Petterson (Sweden) Gunilla Dahlström	15–5, 15–6	(gold) Winner
1962	Belgian International	(Denmark) Karin Jørgensen	(England) Ursula Smith (England) Jenny Pritchard	17–16, 7–15, 15–8	(gold) Winner
1962	Dutch Open	(Denmark) Bente Flindt	(Netherlands) Els Robbé (England) Jenny Pritchard	15–11, 15–8	(gold) Winner
1963	German Open	(Denmark) Karin Jørgensen	(United States) Judy Hashman (Republic of Ireland) Sue Peard	15–8, 15–10	(gold) Winner
1963	All England Open	(Denmark) Karin Jørgensen	(United States) Judy Hashman (Republic of Ireland) Sue Peard	6–15, 9–15	(silver) Runner-up
1963	Nordic Championships	(Denmark) Karin Jørgensen	(Denmark) Anne Flindt (Denmark) Bente Flindt	6–15, 15–4, 15–9	(gold) Winner
1963	Swedish Open	(Denmark) Karin Jørgensen	(England) Ursula Smith (England) June Timperley	15–2, 18–14	(gold) Winner
1964	All England Open	(Denmark) Karin Jørgensen	(United States) Judy Hashman (Republic of Ireland) Sue Peard	15–11, 6–15, 15–10	(gold) Winner
1964	Nordic Championships	(Denmark) Karin Jørgensen	(Denmark) Pernille Mølgaard Hansen (Denmark) Lizbeth von Barnekow	11–15, 18–14	(silver) Runner-up
1964	Swedish Open	(Denmark) Karin Jørgensen	(United States) Judy Hashman (Republic of Ireland) Mary O'Sullivan	7–15, 3–15	(silver) Runner-up
1965	All England Open	(Denmark) Karin Jørgensen	(England) Jenny Pritchard (England) Ursula Smith	15–10, 15–0	(gold) Winner
1965	Nordic Championships	(Denmark) Karin Jørgensen	(Sweden) Eva Twedberg (Sweden) Gunilla Dahlström	15–9, 15–4	(gold) Winner
1965	Swedish Open	(Denmark) Karin Jørgensen	(Sweden) Eva Twedberg (Sweden) Gunilla Dahlström	15–1, 15–4	(gold) Winner
1966	German Open	(Denmark) Karin Jørgensen	(United States) Judy Hashman (Republic of Ireland) Sue Peard	7–15, 3–15	(silver) Runner-up
1966	All England Open	(Denmark) Karin Jørgensen	(United States) Judy Hashman (Republic of Ireland) Sue Peard	5–15, 17–14, 12–15	(silver) Runner-up
1966	U.S. Open	(England) Ursula Smith	(United States) Judy Hashman (Republic of Ireland) Sue Peard	5–15, 5–15	(silver) Runner-up
1966	Nordic Championships	(Denmark) Karin Jørgensen	(Sweden) Eva Twedberg (Sweden) Gunilla Dahlström	15–9, 15–6	(gold) Winner
1966	Denmark Open	(Denmark) Karin Jørgensen	(England) Heather Ward (Netherlands) Imre Rietveld	15–4, 15–12	(gold) Winner
1966	Swedish Open	(Denmark) Karin Jørgensen	(United States) Judy Hashman (Sweden) Eva Twedberg	15–12, 10–15, 8–15	(silver) Runner-up
1967	All England Open	(Netherlands) Imre Rietveld	(United States) Judy Hashman (England) Janet Brennan	11–15, 15–8, 15–4	(gold) Winner
1967	Dutch Open	(Netherlands) Imre Rietveld	(Denmark) Pernille Mølgaard Hansen (Denmark) Lizbeth von Barnekow	15–5, 15–4	(gold) Winner
1967	Denmark Open	(Netherlands) Imre Rietveld	(Japan) Hiroe Amano (Japan) Noriko Takagi	12–15, 15–9, 8–15	(silver) Runner-up
1967	Swedish Open	(Denmark) Lonny Funch	(Netherlands) Imre Rietveld (Sweden) Eva Twedberg	15–9, 15–4	(gold) Winner
1967	Norwegian International	(Denmark) Lizbeth von Barnekow	(Sweden) Eva Twedberg (Sweden) Gittan Nyberg	15–1, 15–8	(gold) Winner
1967	Nordic Championships	(Denmark) Lizbeth von Barnekow	(Sweden) Eva Twedberg (Sweden) Marianne Flykt	18–13, 15–3	(gold) Winner
1967	German Open	(Denmark) Lizbeth von Barnekow	(West Germany) Irmgard Latz (West Germany) Marieluise Wackerow	14–18, 15–9, 9–15	(silver) Runner-up
1968	Denmark Open	(Denmark) Karin Jørgensen	(Japan) Hiroe Amano (Japan) Noriko Takagi	11–15, 11–15	(silver) Runner-up
1968	Swedish Open	(Denmark) Lonny Funch	(Denmark) Anne Flindt (Denmark) Pernille Mølgaard Hansen	4–15, 15–6, 18–16	(gold) Winner
1968	Nordic Championships	(Denmark) Karin Jørgensen	(Denmark) Anne Flindt (Denmark) Pernille Mølgaard Hansen	6–15, 11–15	(silver) Runner-up
1971	Dutch Open	(Denmark) Karin Jørgensen	(England) Judy Hashman (England) Gillian Gilks	6–15, 2–15	(silver) Runner-up
1971	Nordic Championships	(Denmark) Karin Jørgensen	(Denmark) Anne Flindt (Denmark) Pernille Kaagaard	walkover	(silver) Runner-up
1973	Denmark Open	(Denmark) Karin Jørgensen	(Netherlands) Marjan Luesken (Netherlands) Joke van Beusekom	14–17, 14–17	(silver) Runner-up
1973	Nordic Championships	(Denmark) Pernille Kaagaard	(Denmark) Lonny Bostofte (Denmark) Lene Køppen	15–12, 15–10	(gold) Winner
1974	Denmark Open	(Denmark) Pernille Kaagaard	(Japan) Machiko Aizawa (Japan) Etsuko Takenaka	15–18, 15–12	(silver) Runner-up

Mixed doubles
Year	Tournament	Partner	Opponent	Score	Result
1959	French Open	(Denmark) Arne Rasmussen	(Sweden) Atte Nyberg (France) Mireille Laurent	9–15, 5–15	(silver) Runner-up
1962	All England Open	(Denmark) Finn Kobberø	(Denmark) Poul-Erik Nielsen (Denmark) Inge Birgit Hansen	15–1, 15–11	(gold) Winner
1962	Nordic Championships	(Denmark) Poul-Erik Nielsen	(Sweden) Bertil Glans (Sweden) Gunilla Dahlström	15–10, 15–14	(gold) Winner
1962	Belgian International	(Denmark) Finn Kobberø	(Denmark) Jørgen Hammergaard Hansen (Denmark) Karin Jørgensen	6–15, 15–10, 15–6	(gold) Winner
1962	Dutch Open	(Malaysia) Oon Chong Teik	(Thailand) Charoen Wattanasin (Netherlands) Els Robbé	15–10, 15–5	(gold) Winner
1963	All England Open	(Denmark) Finn Kobberø	(England) Tony Jordan (England) June Timperley	15–8, 15–12	(gold) Winner
1963	Nordic Championships	(Denmark) Henning Borch	(Denmark) Ole Mertz (Denmark) Karin Jørgensen	15–13, 15–8	(gold) Winner
1963	Swedish Open	(Denmark) Poul-Erik Nielsen	(England) Tony Jordan (England) June Timperley	9–15, 15–3, 15–4	(gold) Winner
1964	All England Open	(Denmark) Finn Kobberø	(England) Tony Jordan (England) Jenny Pritchard	10–15, 13–18	(silver) Runner-up
1964	Nordic Championships	(Denmark) Finn Kobberø	(Denmark) Ole Mertz (Denmark) Annette Rye	15–6, 15–12	(gold) Winner
1965	All England Open	(Denmark) Finn Kobberø	(England) Tony Jordan (England) Jenny Pritchard	9–15, 15–4, 15–12	(gold) Winner
1965	Swedish Open	(Denmark) Henning Borch	(Sweden) Berndt Dahlberg (Sweden) Gunilla Dahlström	15–9, 15–9	(gold) Winner
1965	Nordic Championships	(Denmark) Erland Kops	(Sweden) Bengt-Ake Jonsson (Sweden) Gunilla Dahlström	15–11, 15–10	(gold) Winner
1966	Canadian Open	(Malaysia) Ng Boon Bee	(United States) Donald C. Paup (United States) Helen Tibbetts	15–10, 15–9	(gold) Winner
1966	German Open	(Denmark) Morten Pommergaard	(West Germany) Wolfgang Bochow (West Germany) Irmgard Latz	15–6, 15–8	(gold) Winner
1966	All England Open	(Denmark) Finn Kobberø	(Denmark) Per Walsøe (Denmark) Pernille Mølgaard Hansen	15–13, 15–3	(gold) Winner
1966	Denmark Open	(Denmark) Finn Kobberø	(Denmark) Per Walsøe (Denmark) Pernille Mølgaard Hansen	8–15, 15–7, 15–11	(gold) Winner
1966	Swedish Open	(Denmark) Henning Borch	(Denmark) Per Walsøe (Denmark) Pernille Mølgaard Hansen	7–15, 15–9, 8–15	(silver) Runner-up
1966	Nordic Championships	(Denmark) Per Walsøe	(Denmark) Henning Borch (Denmark) Karin Jørgensen	15–1, 15–9	(gold) Winner
1967	German Open	(Denmark) Per Walsøe	(England) Tony Jordan (England) Angela Bairstow	15–8, 15–8	(gold) Winner
1967	All England Open	(Denmark) Svend Pri	(Denmark) Per Walsøe (Denmark) Pernille Mølgaard Hansen	15–2, 15–10	(gold) Winner
1967	Denmark Open	(Denmark) Svend Pri	(Denmark) Per Walsøe (Denmark) Pernille Mølgaard Hansen	15–11, 15–12	(gold) Winner
1967	Swedish Open	(Denmark) Henning Borch	(Denmark) Per Walsøe (Denmark) Pernille Mølgaard Hansen	6–15, 15–11, 4–15	(silver) Runner-up
1967	Norwegian International	(Denmark) Elo Hansen	(Denmark) Erland Kops (Denmark) Lizbeth von Barnekow	15–9, 15–12	(gold) Winner
1967	Nordic Championships	(Denmark) Erland Kops	(Denmark) Henning Borch (Denmark) Lizbeth von Barnekow	8–15, 17–14, 15–13	(gold) Winner
1968	Denmark Open	(Denmark) Svend Pri	(Denmark) Per Walsøe (Denmark) Pernille Mølgaard Hansen	12–15, 2–15	(silver) Runner-up
1970	Denmark Open	(Denmark) Klaus Kaagaard	(Denmark) Henning Borch (Denmark) Imre Rietveld Nielsen	15–11, 13–18, 15–10	(gold) Winner
1970	Nordic Championships	(Denmark) Svend Pri	(Denmark) Jørgen Mortensen (Denmark) Anne Flindt	15–11, 6–15, 15–10	(gold) Winner
1971	Denmark Open	(Denmark) Svend Pri	(England) Ray Stevens (Canada) Barbara Hood	15–13, 15–11	(gold) Winner
1971	All England Open	(Denmark) Svend Pri	(England) Derek Talbot (England) Gillian Gilks	15–12, 8–15, 15–11	(gold) Winner
1971	Dutch Open	(Denmark) Svend Pri	(England) Derek Talbot (England) Gillian Gilks	4–15, 15–6, 16–17	(silver) Runner-up
1971	Nordic Championships	(Denmark) Svend Pri	(Denmark) Per Walsøe (Denmark) Pernille Kaagaard	walkover	(silver) Runner-up
1972	Swedish Open	(Denmark) Svend Pri	(England) David Eddy (England) Gillian Gilks	10–15, 8–15	(silver) Runner-up
1972	Denmark Open	(Denmark) Svend Pri	(Germany) Wolfgang Bochow (Germany) Marieluise Wackerow	7–15, 15–13, 10–15	(silver) Runner-up
1972	All England Open	(Denmark) Svend Pri	(England) Derek Talbot (England) Gillian Gilks	12–15, 15–8, 15–12	(gold) Winner
1972	Nordic Championships	(Denmark) Elo Hansen	(Denmark) Per Walsøe (Denmark) Pernille Kaagaard	15–11, 15–11	(gold) Winner
1973	Denmark Open	(Denmark) Elo Hansen	(England) Derek Talbot (England) Nora Gardner	4–15, 17–14, 15–10	(gold) Winner
1973	Nordic Championships	(Denmark) Elo Hansen	(Sweden) Gert Perneklo (Sweden) Eva Stuart	15–11, 15–11	(gold) Winner
1974	Denmark Open	(Denmark) Elo Hansen	(West Germany) Wolfgang Bochow (West Germany) Marieluise Wackerow	15–5, 15–3	(gold) Winner
1974	Swedish Open	(Denmark) Henning Borch	(West Germany) Roland Maywald (West Germany) Brigitte Steden	7–15, 6–15	(silver) Runner-up

== Summary of major tournaments ==
Rank	Event	Date	Venue
European Championships
3	Women's doubles	1974	Vienna, AUT
Open Championships
1	Women's doubles	1964, 1965, 1967	All England Open
1	Mixed doubles	1962, 1963, 1965, 1966, 1967, 1971, 1972	All England Open
1	Women's doubles	1966	Denmark Open
1	Mixed doubles	1966, 1967, 1970, 1971, 1973, 1974	Denmark Open
1	Women's doubles	1962, 1967	Dutch Open
1	Mixed doubles	1962	Dutch Open
1	Women's doubles	1963	German Open
1	Mixed doubles	1966, 1967	German Open
1	Women's singles	1963, 1964, 1965, 1966	Nordic Championships
1	Women's doubles	1962, 1963, 1965, 1966, 1967, 1973	Nordic Championships
1	Mixed doubles	1962, 1963, 1964, 1965, 1966, 1967, 1970, 1972, 1973	Nordic Championships
1	Women's singles	1962, 1967	Swedish Open
1	Women's doubles	1963, 1965, 1967, 1968	Swedish Open
1	Mixed doubles	1963, 1965, 1968	Swedish Open
1	Mixed doubles	1966	Canadian Open
2	Women's singles	1965	All England Open
2	Women's doubles	1962, 1963, 1966	All England Open
2	Mixed doubles	1964	All England Open
