= Per Walsøe =

Danish badminton player and judge

Personal information
- Born: 8 June 1943
- Died: 11 May 2024 (aged 80)

Sport
- Country: Denmark
- Sport: Badminton
- Career title: 1970 European Men's doubles champion
Medal record
Men's badminton
Representing Denmark
European Championships
Gold medal – first place	1970 Port Talbot	Men's doubles
Bronze medal – third place	1970 Port Talbot	Mixed doubles

Per Walsøe (8 June 1943 – 11 May 2024) was a Danish Supreme Court judge and a badminton player who won a number of Danish national and international doubles titles from the mid-1960s to the early 1970s.

== Career ==
Walsoe won the gold medal at the 1970 European Badminton Championships in men's doubles with Elo Hansen. He also captured the mixed doubles crown at the prestigious All-England Championships with Pernille Molgaard Hansen in 1970, having previously reached the final with the same partner in 1966 and 1967. Walsoe was also a runner-up with Svend Andersen (Pri) in the 1967 All-England men's doubles to fellow Danes Erland Kops and Henning Borch. One of the physically largest men to have played world class badminton, Walsoe represented Denmark in Thomas Cup (world men's team) competition in the '66-'67, '69-'70, and '75-'76 seasons.

== Achievements ==
=== European Championships ===
Men's doubles
Year	Venue	Partner	Opponent	Score	Result
1970	Afan Lido, Port Talbot, Wales	(Denmark) Elo Hansen	(Denmark) Henning Borch (Denmark) Erland Kops	15–9, 2–15, 15–10	Gold

Mixed doubles
Year	Venue	Partner	Opponent	Score	Result
1970	Afan Lido, Port Talbot, Wales	(Denmark) Anne Berglund	(England) Derek Talbot (England) Gillian Perrin	18–14, 11–15, 7–15	Bronze

=== International tournaments (19 titles, 20 runners-up) ===
Men's doubles
Year	Tournament	Partner	Opponent	Score	Result
1966	German Open	(Denmark) Poul-Erik Nielsen	(England) Tony Jordan (England) David Horton	15–4, 15–5	(gold) Winner
1966	Nordic Championships	(Denmark) Svend Pri	(Denmark) Henning Borch (Denmark) Erland Kops	16–18, 8–15	(silver) Runner-up
1967	Swedish Open	(Denmark) Svend Pri	(Denmark) Henning Borch (Denmark) Erland Kops	15–2, 15–12	(gold) Winner
1967	Denmark Open	(Denmark) Svend Pri	(Malaysia) Ng Boon Bee (Malaysia) Tan Yee Khan	15–8, 16–18, 15–17	(silver) Runner-up
1967	German Open	(Denmark) Erland Kops	(West Germany) Wolfgang Bochow (West Germany) Friedhelm Wulff	9–15, 15–9, 0–15	(silver) Runner-up
1967	All England	(Denmark) Svend Pri	(Denmark) Henning Borch (Denmark) Erland Kops	8–15, 12–15	(silver) Runner-up
1968	Swedish Open	(Denmark) Poul-Erik Nielsen	(Denmark) Henning Borch (Denmark) Erland Kops	7–15, 11–15	(silver) Runner-up
1968	Nordic Championships	(Denmark) Svend Pri	(Denmark) Henning Borch (Denmark) Erland Kops	15–12, 15–4	(gold) Winner
1969	Nordic Championships	(Denmark) Svend Pri	(Denmark) Henning Borch (Denmark) Erland Kops	15–5, 15–2	(gold) Winner
1970	Swedish Open	(Denmark) Svend Pri	(Denmark) Poul Peterson (Denmark) Elo Hansen	15–5, 11–15, 15–1	(gold) Winner
1970	Denmark Open	(Denmark) Svend Pri	(Denmark) Henning Borch (Denmark) Erland Kops	15–17, 15–10, 2–15	(silver) Runner-up
1970	Nordic Championships	(Denmark) Svend Pri	(Denmark) Flemming Delfs (Denmark) Jørgen Mortensen	15–8, 15–8	(gold) Winner
1971	Swedish Open	(Denmark) Svend Pri	(Denmark) Henning Borch (Denmark) Erland Kops	15–11, 15–11	(gold) Winner
1971	Nordic Championships	(Denmark) Poul Petersen	(Denmark) Svend Pri (Denmark) Erland Kops	5–15, 11–15	(silver) Runner-up
1972	Norwegian International	(Denmark) Klaus Kaagaard	(Sweden) Bengt Fröman (Sweden) Thomas Kihlström	18–14, 18–13	(gold) Winner
1972	French Open	(France) Joël Guéguen	(West Germany) Holger Rode (West Germany) Edelwald Rumpel	16–17, 8–15	(silver) Runner-up
1972	Swedish Open	(Denmark) Poul Petersen	(Denmark) Svend Pri (Denmark) Erland Kops	4–15, 15–9, 12–15	(silver) Runner-up

Mixed doubles
Year	Tournament	Partner	Opponent	Score	Result
1966	Nordic Championships	(Denmark) Ulla Strand	(Denmark) Henning Borch (Denmark) Karin Jorgensen	15–1, 15–9	(gold) Winner
1966	Swedish Open	(Denmark) Pernille Mølgaard Hansen	(Denmark) Henning Borch (Denmark) Ulla Strand	15–7, 9–15, 15–8	(gold) Winner
1966	Denmark Open	(Denmark) Pernille Mølgaard Hansen	(Denmark) Finn Kobberø (Denmark) Ulla Strand	15–8, 7–15, 11–15	(silver) Runner-up
1966	All England Open	(Denmark) Pernille Mølgaard Hansen	(Denmark) Finn Kobberø (Denmark) Ulla Strand	13–15, 3–15	(silver) Runner-up
1967	Swedish Open	(Denmark) Pernille Mølgaard Hansen	(Denmark) Henning Borch (Denmark) Ulla Strand	15–6, 11–15, 15–4	(gold) Winner
1967	Denmark Open	(Denmark) Pernille Mølgaard Hansen	(Denmark) Svend Pri (Denmark) Ulla Strand	11–15, 12–15	(silver) Runner-up
1967	German Open	(Denmark) Ulla Strand	(England) Tony Jordan (England) Angela Bairstow	15–8, 15–8	(gold) Winner
1967	All England Open	(Denmark) Pernille Mølgaard Hansen	(Denmark) Svend Pri (Denmark) Ulla Strand	2–15, 10–15	(silver) Runner-up
1968	Swedish Open	(Denmark) Pernille Mølgaard Hansen	(Denmark) Svend Pri (Denmark) Ulla Strand	5–15, 11–15	(silver) Runner-up
1968	Denmark Open	(Denmark) Pernille Mølgaard Hansen	(Denmark) Svend Pri (Denmark) Ulla Strand	15–2, 15–8	(gold) Winner
1968	German Open	(Denmark) Pernille Mølgaard Hansen	(England) Tony Jordan (England) Susan Whetnall	10–15, 17–18	(silver) Runner-up
1969	Swedish Open	(Denmark) Pernille Mølgaard Hansen	(England) Roger Mills (England) Gillian Perrin	12–15, 7–15	(silver) Runner-up
1969	Denmark Open	(Denmark) Pernille Mølgaard Hansen	(Denmark) Henning Borch (Denmark) Imre Rietveld Nielsen	12–15, 7–15	(silver) Runner-up
1969	German Open	(Denmark) Pernille Mølgaard Hansen	(England) Tony Jordan (England) Susan Whetnall	11–15, 15–13, 10–15	(silver) Runner-up
1969	Nordic Championships	(Denmark) Pernille Mølgaard Hansen	(Denmark) Henning Borch (Denmark) Imre Rietveld Nielsen	15–12, 15–13	(gold) Winner
1970	Swedish Open	(Denmark) Pernille Mølgaard Hansen	(Denmark) Elo Hansen (Denmark) Karin Jorgensen	3–15, 15–5, 15–8	(gold) Winner
1970	All England Open	(Denmark) Pernille Mølgaard Hansen	(West Germany) Wolfgang Bochow (West Germany) Irmgard Latz	17–14, 15–12	(gold) Winner
1971	Swedish Open	(Denmark) Pernille Kaagaard	(England) Derek Talbot (England) Gillian Perrin	15–5, 6–15, 14–17	(silver) Runner-up
1971	Nordic Championships	(Denmark) Pernille Kaagaard	(Denmark) Svend Pri (Denmark) Ulla Strand	walkover	(gold) Winner
1972	Norwegian International	(Denmark) Pernille Kaagaard	(Denmark) Klaus Kaagaard (Denmark) Anne Flindt	15–8, 15–3	(gold) Winner
1972	Nordic Championships	(Denmark) Pernille Kaagaard	(Denmark) Elo Hansen (Denmark) Ulla Strand	11–15, 11–15	(silver) Runner-up
1972	French Open	(France) Yveline Hue	(West Germany) Holger Rode (France) Viviane Beaugin	9–15, 15–9, 15–11	(gold) Winner
