= Nordic Championships (badminton) =

Annual badminton championship in Scandinavia

The Nordic Championships in badminton was an international open held in the Scandinavian states from 1962 until 1999. Between 1962 and 1988 it was held annually. Afterwards it took place biannually, which increased to 3 years once with the change from the even years up to 1992 into odd years starting in 1995.

== Winners ==
Year	Men's singles	Women's singles	Men's doubles	Women's doubles	Mixed doubles
1962	(Denmark) Knud Aage Nielsen	(Denmark) Karin Jørgensen	(Sweden) Bertil Glans (Sweden) Göran Wahlqvist	(Denmark) Karin Jørgensen (Denmark) Ulla Rasmussen	(Denmark) Poul-Erik Nielsen (Denmark) Ulla Rasmussen
1963	(Denmark) Knud Aage Nielsen	(Denmark) Ulla Rasmussen	(Denmark) Henning Borch (Denmark) Knud Aage Nielsen	(Denmark) Karin Jørgensen (Denmark) Ulla Rasmussen	(Denmark) Henning Borch (Denmark) Ulla Rasmussen
1964	(Denmark) Erland Kops	(Denmark) Ulla Rasmussen	(Denmark) Ole Mertz (Denmark) Jesper Sandvad	(Denmark) Lisbeth von Barnekow (Denmark) Pernille Mølgaard Hansen	(Denmark) Finn Kobberø (Denmark) Ulla Rasmussen
1965	(Denmark) Erland Kops	(Denmark) Ulla Strand	(Denmark) Erland Kops (Denmark) Klaus Kaagaard	(Denmark) Karin Jørgensen (Denmark) Ulla Strand	(Denmark) Erland Kops (Denmark) Ulla Strand
1966	(Denmark) Erland Kops	(Denmark) Ulla Strand	(Denmark) Erland Kops (Denmark) Henning Borch	(Denmark) Karin Jørgensen (Denmark) Ulla Strand	(Denmark) Per Walsøe (Denmark) Ulla Strand
1967	(Denmark) Erland Kops	(Sweden) Eva Twedberg	(Denmark) Erland Kops (Denmark) Henning Borch	(Denmark) Lisbeth von Barnekow (Denmark) Ulla Strand	(Denmark) Erland Kops (Denmark) Ulla Strand
1968	(Denmark) Erland Kops	(Denmark) Jette Føge	(Denmark) Svend Andersen (Denmark) Per Walsøe	(Denmark) Anne Flindt (Denmark) Pernille Mølgaard Hansen	(Denmark) Poul-Erik Nielsen (Denmark) Pernille Mølgaard Hansen
1969	(Sweden) Sture Johnsson	(Denmark) Imre Rietveld Nielsen	(Denmark) Svend Pri (Denmark) Per Walsøe	(Denmark) Anne Flindt (Denmark) Pernille Mølgaard Hansen	(Denmark) Per Walsøe (Denmark) Pernille Mølgaard Hansen
1970	(Denmark) Jørgen Mortensen	(Denmark) Lisbeth von Barnekow	(Denmark) Svend Pri (Denmark) Per Walsøe	(Denmark) Anne Flindt (Denmark) Pernille Kaagaard	(Denmark) Svend Pri (Denmark) Ulla Strand
1971	(Denmark) Svend Pri	(Sweden) Eva Twedberg	(Denmark) Erland Kops (Denmark) Svend Pri	(Denmark) Anne Flindt (Denmark) Pernille Kaagaard	(Denmark) Per Walsøe (Denmark) Pernille Kaagaard
1972	(Sweden) Sture Johnsson	(Sweden) Eva Twedberg	(Denmark) Svend Pri (Denmark) Poul Petersen	(Denmark) Lene Køppen (Denmark) Anne Berglund	(Denmark) Elo Hansen (Denmark) Ulla Strand
1973	(Denmark) Svend Pri	(Denmark) Lene Køppen	(Denmark) Flemming Delfs (Denmark) Elo Hansen	(Denmark) Pernille Kaagaard (Denmark) Ulla Strand	(Denmark) Elo Hansen (Denmark) Ulla Strand
1974	(Denmark) Svend Pri	(Denmark) Lene Køppen	(Denmark) Svend Pri (Denmark) Poul Petersen	(Denmark) Lene Køppen (Denmark) Imre Rietveld Nielsen	(Denmark) Elo Hansen (Denmark) Pernille Kaagaard
1975	(Sweden) Sture Johnsson	(Denmark) Lene Køppen	(Sweden) Bengt Fröman (Sweden) Thomas Kihlström	(Denmark) Lene Køppen (Denmark) Inge Borgstrøm	(Denmark) Steen Skovgaard (Denmark) Lene Køppen
1976	(Denmark) Flemming Delfs	(Denmark) Lene Køppen	(Sweden) Bengt Fröman (Sweden) Thomas Kihlström	(Denmark) Lene Køppen (Denmark) Pia Nielsen	(Denmark) Steen Skovgaard (Denmark) Lene Køppen
1977	(Denmark) Svend Pri	(Denmark) Lene Køppen	(Sweden) Bengt Fröman (Sweden) Thomas Kihlström	(Denmark) Lene Køppen (Denmark) Inge Borgstrøm	(Denmark) Steen Skovgaard (Denmark) Lene Køppen
1978	(Denmark) Morten Frost	(Denmark) Lene Køppen	(Denmark) Flemming Delfs (Denmark) Steen Skovgaard	(Denmark) Lene Køppen (Denmark) Susanne Berg	(Denmark) Steen Skovgaard (Denmark) Lene Køppen
1979	(Denmark) Morten Frost	(Denmark) Lene Køppen	(Sweden) Bengt Fröman (Sweden) Thomas Kihlström	(Denmark) Lene Køppen (Denmark) Inge Borgstrøm	(Denmark) Steen Skovgaard (Denmark) Lene Køppen
1980	(Denmark) Morten Frost	(Denmark) Lene Køppen	(Denmark) Morten Frost (Denmark) Steen Fladberg	(Denmark) Lene Køppen (Denmark) Pia Nielsen	(Denmark) Steen Skovgaard (Denmark) Lene Køppen
1981	(Denmark) Morten Frost	(Denmark) Lene Køppen	(Denmark) Morten Frost (Denmark) Steen Fladberg	(Denmark) Lene Køppen (Denmark) Pia Nielsen	(Denmark) Steen Skovgaard (Denmark) Lene Køppen
1982	(Denmark) Morten Frost	(Denmark) Nettie Nielsen	(Denmark) Morten Frost (Denmark) Steen Fladberg	(Denmark) Dorte Kjær (Denmark) Nettie Nielsen	(Denmark) Steen Skovgaard (Denmark) Hanne Adsbøl
1983	(Denmark) Morten Frost	(Denmark) Kirsten Larsen	(Sweden) Stefan Karlsson (Sweden) Thomas Kihlström	(Sweden) Maria Bengtsson (Sweden) Christine Magnusson	(Sweden) Thomas Kihlström (Sweden) Maria Bengtsson
1984	(Denmark) Morten Frost	(Denmark) Kirsten Larsen	(Sweden) Stefan Karlsson (Sweden) Thomas Kihlström	(Denmark) Dorte Kjær (Denmark) Kirsten Larsen	(Denmark) Jesper Helledie (Denmark) Dorte Kjær
1985	(Denmark) Ib Frederiksen	(Sweden) Christine Magnusson	(Sweden) Stefan Karlsson (Sweden) Thomas Kihlstrom	(Denmark) Dorte Kjær (Denmark) Nettie Nielsen	(Sweden) Stefan Karlsson (Sweden) Maria Bengtsson
1986	(Denmark) Michael Kjeldsen	(Denmark) Kirsten Larsen	(Denmark) Morten Frost (Denmark) Steen Fladberg	(Denmark) Dorte Kjær (Denmark) Nettie Nielsen	(Sweden) Jan-Eric Antonsson (Sweden) Maria Bengtsson
1987	(Denmark) Michael Kjeldsen	(Denmark) Christina Bostofte	(Denmark) Steen Fladberg (Denmark) Jan Paulsen	(Denmark) Dorte Kjær (Denmark) Nettie Nielsen	(Denmark) Jesper Knudsen (Denmark) Nettie Nielsen
1988	(Denmark) Morten Frost	(Denmark) Kirsten Larsen	(Denmark) Jens Peter Nierhoff (Denmark) Michael Kjeldsen	(Denmark) Dorte Kjær (Denmark) Nettie Nielsen	(Denmark) Jesper Knudsen (Denmark) Nettie Nielsen
1990	(Denmark) Poul Erik Hoyer Larsen	(Denmark) Pernille Nedergaard	(Denmark) Thomas Stuer-Lauridsen (Denmark) Max Gandrup	(Denmark) Dorte Kjær (Denmark) Lotte Olsen	(Denmark) Thomas Lund (Denmark) Pernille Dupont
1992	(Denmark) Thomas Stuer-Lauridsen	(Sweden) Christine Magnusson	(Denmark) Jon Holst-Christensen (Denmark) Jan Paulsen	(Sweden) Christine Magnusson (Sweden) Lim Xiaoqing	(Sweden) Pär-Gunnar Jönsson (Sweden) Maria Bengtsson
1995	(Denmark) Thomas Stuer-Lauridsen	(Sweden) Lim Xiaoqing	(Denmark) Michael Søgaard (Denmark) Henrik Svarrer	(Denmark) Rikke Olsen (Denmark) Helene Kirkegaard	(Denmark) Michael Søgaard (Denmark) Rikke Olsen
1997	(Denmark) Peter Rasmussen	(Denmark) Camilla Martin	(Denmark) Jesper Larsen (Denmark) Jens Eriksen	(Denmark) Rikke Olsen (Denmark) Helene Kirkegaard	(Denmark) Jens Eriksen (Denmark) Marlene Thomsen
1999	(Sweden) Thomas Johansson	(Denmark) Mette Sørensen	(Denmark) Thomas Stavngaard (Denmark) Lars Paaske	(Denmark) Ann-Lou Jørgensen (Denmark) Mette Schjoldager	(Sweden) Fredrik Bergström (Sweden) Jenny Karlsson
