= Angela Bairstow =

English badminton player (1942–2016)

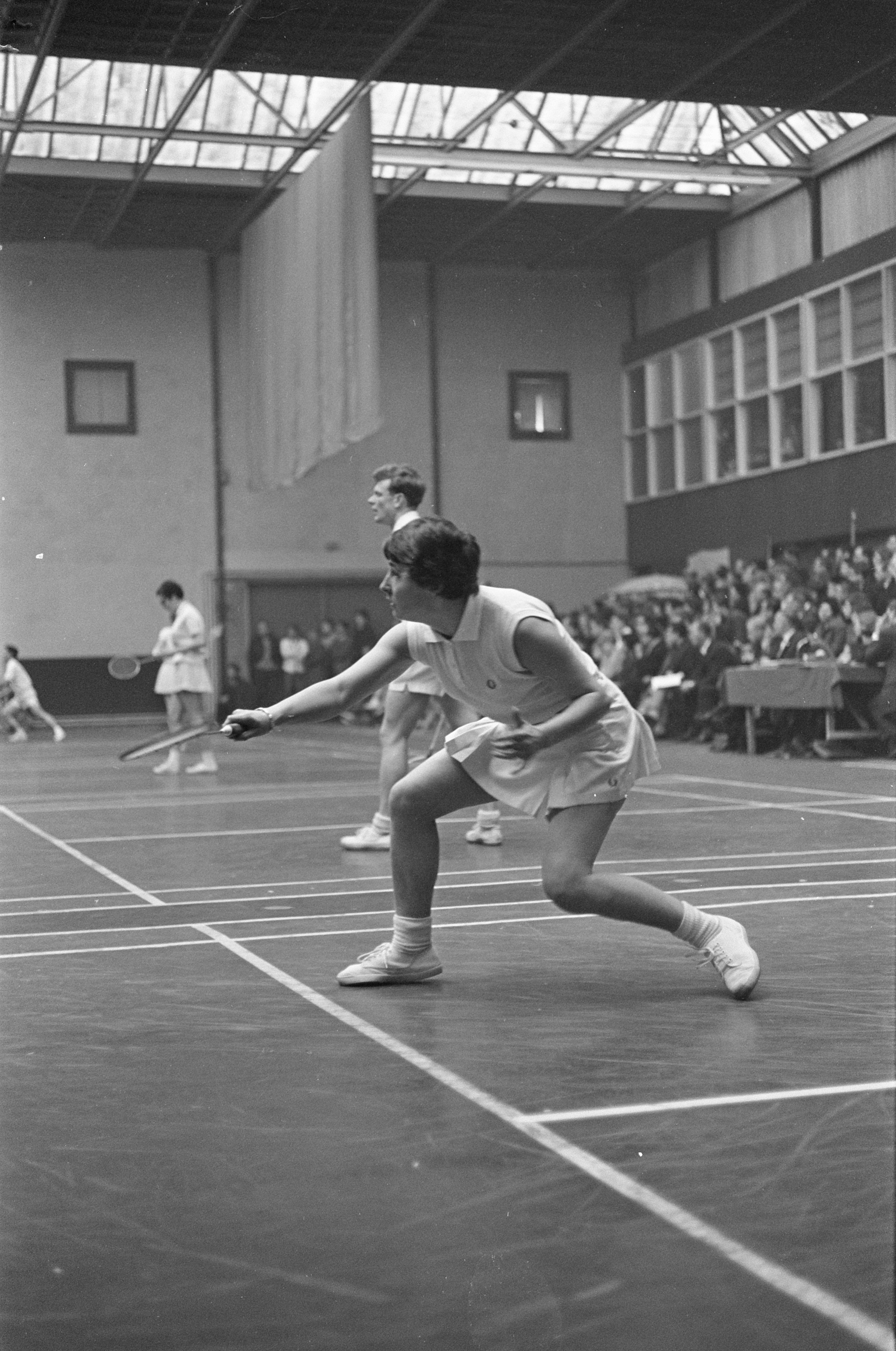

Personal information
- Born: 31 May 1942 Lewes, England
- Died: 13 February 2016 (aged 73)

Sport
- Country: England
- Sport: Badminton
- Handedness: Right
- Coached by: H Ian palmer
- Highest ranking: 1 (1965)
Medal record
Women's badminton
Representing England
Uber Cup
| Silver medal – second place | 1963 Wilmington | Women's team |
Commonwealth Games
| Gold medal – first place | 1966 Kingston | Women's singles |
| Gold medal – first place | 1966 Kingston | Mixed doubles |
| Silver medal – second place | 1966 Kingston | Women's doubles |
Asian Championships
| Gold medal – first place | 1965 Lucknow | Women's singles |
| Gold medal – first place | 1965 Lucknow | Women's doubles |
| Gold medal – first place | 1965 Lucknow | Mixed doubles |
European Championships
| Silver medal – second place | 1968 Bochum | Women's doubles |
| Bronze medal – third place | 1968 Bochum | Women's singles |

Angela Bairstow (31 May 1942 – 13 February 2016) was an English international badminton player.

== Early life ==
She lived on Plough Lane, in Purley. She attended Dinorben School, a private girls school, on Woodcote Lane (A237) in Wallington.

== Badminton career ==
She first came to prominence in 1958 when she won the English National Junior singles title. Further wins followed in 1959 and 1960; in addition she won four English National Junior doubles titles. After the step up to senior competition she reached the final of the 1963 All England Badminton Championships singles losing out to Judy Hashman. In 1963 at the All England Championships she was seeded to win in the Singles, Doubles and the Mixed.

Although never winning an All England title Bairstow became a significant player for England winning a host of titles from 1964 to 1968 including the Scottish Open, German Open, Dutch Open, Asia Cup, Irish Open, English National Badminton Championships and European Badminton Championships.

In 1965 Bairstow won the Dutch open in Singles, Doubles and Mixed in the same year with another three Dutch titles afterwards. She repeated the triple at the second Asian Championships in 1965 in Lucknow. After which the organisers banned non-Asian players from entering. Bairstow brought to prominence a deceptive backhand sliced serve and flick. She is the only player in history who won medals in both Asian and European Championships.

Bairstow represented the England team and won two golds and one silver medal, at the 1966 British Empire and Commonwealth Games in Kingston, Jamaica.

== Personal life ==
She married her coach, H. Ian Palmer, in 1970 and had three children (born 1969, 1970 and 1972) and four grandchildren.

== Achievements ==
=== Commonwealth Games ===
Women's singles
| Year | Venue | Opponent | Score | Result |
|---|---|---|---|---|
| 1966 | Convention Hall, Kingston, Jamaica | (Canada) Sharon Whittaker | 11–5, 11–3 | Gold |

Women's doubles
| Year | Venue | Partner | Opponent | Score | Result |
|---|---|---|---|---|---|
| 1966 | Convention Hall, Kingston, Jamaica | (England) Iris Rogers | (England) Jenny Horton (England) Ursula Smith | 7–15, 7–15 | Silver |

Mixed doubles
| Year | Venue | Partner | Opponent | Score | Result |
|---|---|---|---|---|---|
| 1966 | Convention Hall, Kingston, Jamaica | (England) Roger Mills | (England) Tony Jordan (England) Jenny Horton | 7–15, 15–8, 15–12 | Gold |

=== Asian Championships ===
Women's singles
| Year | Venue | Opponent | Score | Result |
|---|---|---|---|---|
| 1965 | Lucknow, India | (England) Ursula Smith | 11–6, 11–4 | Gold |

Women's doubles
| Year | Venue | Partner | Opponent | Score | Result |
|---|---|---|---|---|---|
| 1965 | Lucknow, India | (England) Ursula Smith | (Malaysia) Rosalind Singha Ang (Malaysia) Teoh Siew Yong | 18–13, 15–11 | Gold |

Mixed doubles
| Year | Venue | Partner | Opponent | Score | Result |
|---|---|---|---|---|---|
| 1965 | Lucknow, India | (Malaysia) Tan Yee Khan | (Thailand) Chavalert Chumkum (England) Ursula Smith | 6–15, 15–3, 15–2 | Gold |

=== European Championships ===
Women's singles
| Year | Venue | Opponent | Score | Result |
|---|---|---|---|---|
| 1968 | Ruhrlandhalle, Bochum, Germany | (West Germany) Irmgard Latz | 9–12, 2–11 | Bronze |

Women's doubles
| Year | Venue | Partner | Opponent | Score | Result |
|---|---|---|---|---|---|
| 1968 | Ruhrlandhalle, Bochum, Germany | (England) Gillian Perrin | (England) Margaret Boxall (England) Susan Whetnall | 7–15, 13–18 | Silver |

=== International tournaments (12 titles, 10 runners-up) ===
Women's singles
| Year | Tournament | Opponent | Score | Result |
|---|---|---|---|---|
| 1963 | All England Open | (United States) Judy Hashman | 5–11, 9–11 | (silver) Runner-up |
| 1964 | Dutch Open | (United States) Judy Hashman | 2–11, 2–11 | (silver) Runner-up |
| 1964 | Scottish Open | (England) Ursula Smith | 4–11, 2–11 | (silver) Runner-up |
| 1965 | Dutch Open | (Scotland) Muriel Ferguson | 11–6, 11–1 | (gold) Winner |
| 1965 | Irish Open | (England) Ursula Smith | 11–6, 12–9 | (gold) Winner |
| 1966 | Dutch Open | (England) Heather Nielsen | 11–7, 8–11, 11–5 | (gold) Winner |
| 1966 | Scottish Open | (England) Jenny Horton | 10–11, 11–3, 11–4 | (gold) Winner |
| 1967 | Dutch Open | (Netherlands) Imre Rietveld | 10–11, 5–11 | (silver) Runner-up |
| 1967 | Irish Open | (England) Gillian Perrin | 10–13, 11–8, 11–8 | (gold) Winner |

Women's doubles
| Year | Tournament | Partner | Opponent | Score | Result |
|---|---|---|---|---|---|
| 1963 | Irish Open | (England) Iris Rogers | (England) Brenda Parr (England) Jenny Pritchard | 9–15, 10–15 | (silver) Runner-up |
| 1964 | Dutch Open | (England) Jenny Pritchard | (United States) Judy Hashman (Republic of Ireland) Sue Peard | 8–15, 11–15 | (silver) Runner-up |
| 1964 | Scottish Open | (England) Jenny Pritchard | (England) Margaret Barrand (England) Ursula Smith | 7–15, 17–14, 15–10 | (gold) Winner |
| 1964 | German Open | (England) Jenny Pritchard | (West Germany) Irmgard Latz (Netherlands) Imre Rietveld | 15–8, 15–8 | (gold) Winner |
| 1965 | Dutch Open | (England) Anita Price | (Denmark) Anne Flindt (Denmark) Bente Flindt | 15–5, 15–11 | (gold) Winner |
| 1966 | Scottish Open | (England) Margaret Barrand | (England) Jenny Horton (England) Iris Rogers | 15–10, 15–9 | (gold) Winner |
| 1968 | Dutch Open | (New Zealand) Alison Glenie | (England) Margaret Boxall (England) Susan Pound | 15–5, 0–15, 9–15 | (silver) Runner-up |

Mixed doubles
| Year | Tournament | Partner | Opponent | Score | Result |
|---|---|---|---|---|---|
| 1964 | Dutch Open | (England) Trevor Coates | (England) John Havers (England) Jenny Pritchard | 10–15, 6–15 | (silver) Runner-up |
| 1965 | Dutch Open | (England) Tony Jordan | (England) John Havers (England) Anita Price | 15–4, 18–14 | (gold) Winner |
| 1967 | German Open | (England) Tony Jordan | (Denmark) Per Walsøe (Denmark) Ulla Strand | 8–15, 8–15 | (silver) Runner-up |
| 1967 | Dutch Open | (England) Tony Jordan | (Denmark) Klaus Kaagaard (Denmark) Pernille Mølgaard Hansen | 15–2, 15–11 | (gold) Winner |
| 1967 | Irish Open | (England) Tony Jordan | (England) Roger Mills (England) Iris Rogers | 5–15, 11–15 | (silver) Runner-up |
| 1968 | Dutch Open | (England) Paul Whetnall | (England) David Eddy (England) Margaret Boxall | 15–13, 15–11 | (gold) Winner |
