= Henning Borch =

Danish badminton player

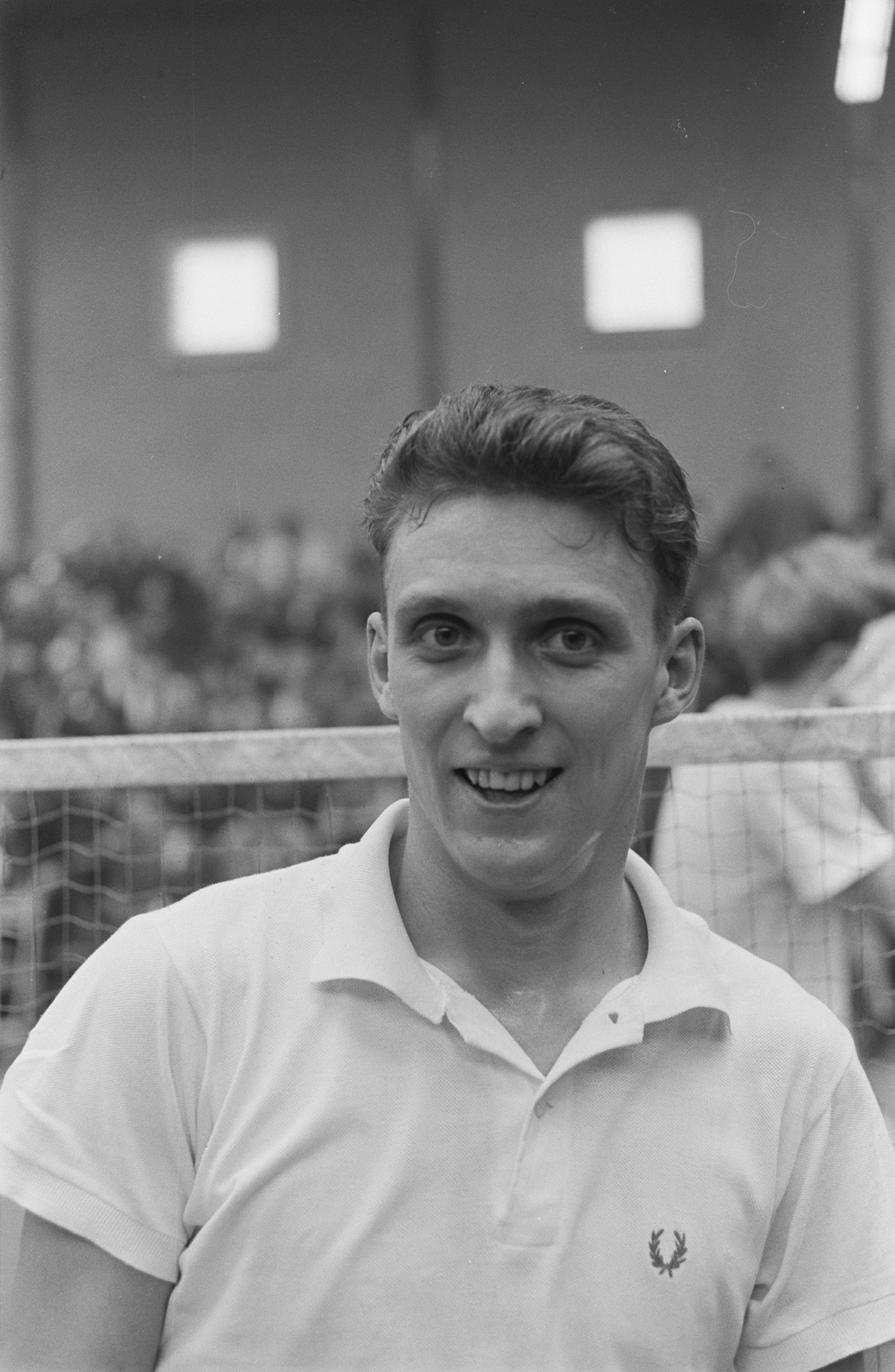

Personal information
- Nickname: Pytte
- Born: 9 March 1938
- Died: 12 June 2024 (aged 86)

Sport
- Country: Denmark
- Sport: Badminton
- Career title: 1967, 1968, 1969 All England
Medal record
Men's badminton
Representing Denmark
Thomas Cup
Silver medal – second place	1964 Tokyo	Men's team
Silver medal – second place	1973 Jakarta	Men's team
European Championships
Silver medal – second place	1970 Port Talbot	Men's doubles

Henning Borch (9 March 1938 – 12 June 2024) was a world class badminton player from Denmark who won major tournaments from the early 1960s to the early 1970s. Borch represented Amager Badminton Club in the domestic competitions throughout his flourished career. In the 1964 Borch reached the men's singles final at the prestigious All-England Championships, narrowly losing to fellow countryman Knud Aage Nielsen. His most impressive achievement was sharing three consecutive All-England men's doubles titles with Erland Kops from 1967 to 1969. Borch took part in five consecutive Thomas Cup (men's international team) campaigns for Denmark between 1960 and 1973.

== Achievements ==
=== European Championships ===
Men's doubles
Year	Venue	Partner	Opponent	Score	Result
1970	Afan Lido, Port Talbot, Wales	(Denmark) Erland Kops	(Denmark) Elo Hansen (Denmark) Per Walsøe	9–15, 15–2, 10–15	Silver

=== International tournaments (18 titles, 20 runners-up) ===
Men's singles
Year	Tournament	Opponent	Score	Result
1963	German Open	(Denmark) Erland Kops	2–15, 3–15	(silver) Runner-up
1963	Dutch Open	(Denmark) Hans Henrik Svendsen	15–9, 15–4	(gold) Winner
1963	Nordic Championships	(Denmark) Knud Aage Nielsen	8–15, 15–6, 16–17	(silver) Runner-up
1964	All England Open	(Denmark) Knud Aage Nielsen	15–8, 15–17, 4–15	(silver) Runner-up
1964	Dutch Open	(Malaysia) Oon Chong Teik	15–5, 18–15	(gold) Winner

Men's doubles
Year	Tournament	Partner	Opponent	Score	Result
1959	All England Open	(Denmark) Jørgen Hammergaard Hansen	(Malaysia) Lim Say Hup (Malaysia) Teh Kew San	2–15, 10–15	(silver) Runner-up
1959	Swedish Open	(Denmark) Knud Aage Nielsen	(Sweden) Berndt Dahlberg (Sweden) Bertil Glans	15–6, 13–15, 11–15	(silver) Runner-up
1962	Swedish Open	(Denmark) Knud Aage Nielsen	(Denmark) Jørgen Hammergaard Hansen (Denmark) Finn Kobberø	14–15, 15–7, 4–15	(silver) Runner-up
1963	Swedish Open	(Denmark) Knud Aage Nielsen	(Denmark) Erland Kops (Denmark) Poul-Erik Nielsen	15–11, 15–9	(gold) Winner
1963	German Open	(Denmark) Jørgen Mortensen	(Denmark) Erland Kops (Denmark) Poul-Erik Nielsen	5–15, 3–15	(silver) Runner-up
1963	Dutch Open	(Denmark) Jørgen Mortensen	(England) Hugh Findlay (England) Tony Jordan	11–15, 17–15, 15–9	(gold) Winner
1963	Nordic Championships	(Denmark) Knud Aage Nielsen	(Sweden) Berndt Dahlberg (Sweden) Bertil Glans	18–13, 18–15	(gold) Winner
1964	Dutch Open	(Denmark) Jørgen Mortensen	(Malaysia) Oon Chong Jin (Malaysia) Oon Chong Teik	15–9, 15–9	(gold) Winner
1965	Swedish Open	(Denmark) Jørgen Mortensen	(Denmark) Erland Kops (Denmark) Knud Aage Nielsen	12–15, 16–18	(silver) Runner-up
1966	Swedish Open	(Denmark) Jørgen Herlevsen	(Denmark) Erland Kops (Denmark) Klaus Kaagaard	18–13, 15–8	(gold) Winner
1966	Nordic Championships	(Denmark) Erland Kops	(Denmark) Per Walsøe (Denmark) Svend Pri	18–16, 15–8	(gold) Winner
1967	Swedish Open	(Denmark) Erland Kops	(Denmark) Per Walsøe (Denmark) Svend Pri	2–15, 12–15	(silver) Runner-up
1967	All England Open	(Denmark) Erland Kops	(Denmark) Per Walsøe (Denmark) Svend Pri	15–8, 15–12	(gold) Winner
1967	Nordic Championships	(Denmark) Erland Kops	(Denmark) Tom Bacher (Denmark) Jørgen Mortensen	15–5, 18–16	(gold) Winner
1968	Swedish Open	(Denmark) Erland Kops	(Denmark) Per Walsøe (Denmark) Poul-Erik Nielsen	15–7, 15–11	(gold) Winner
1968	Denmark Open	(Denmark) Erland Kops	(Japan) Ippei Kojima (Japan) Issei Nichino	15–17, 16–17	(silver) Runner-up
1968	All England Open	(Denmark) Erland Kops	(Malaysia) Ng Boon Bee (Malaysia) Tan Yee Khan	15–6, 15–4	(gold) Winner
1968	Nordic Championships	(Denmark) Erland Kops	(Denmark) Per Walsøe (Denmark) Svend Pri	12–15, 4–15	(silver) Runner-up
1969	German Open	(Denmark) Jørgen Mortensen	(Denmark) Tom Bacher (Denmark) Poul Petersen	15–3, 10–15, 15–6	(gold) Winner
1969	All England Open	(Denmark) Erland Kops	(England) David Eddy (England) Roger Powell	13–15, 15–10, 15–9	(gold) Winner
1969	Nordic Championships	(Denmark) Erland Kops	(Denmark) Per Walsøe (Denmark) Svend Pri	5–15, 2–15	(silver) Runner-up
1970	Denmark Open	(Denmark) Erland Kops	(Denmark) Per Walsøe (Denmark) Svend Pri	17–15, 10–15, 15–2	(gold) Winner
1971	Swedish Open	(Denmark) Erland Kops	(Denmark) Per Walsøe (Denmark) Svend Pri	11–15, 11–15	(silver) Runner-up
1972	Nordic Championships	(Denmark) Erland Kops	(Denmark) Svend Pri (Denmark) Poul Petersen	15–10, 12–15, 9–15	(silver) Runner-up

Mixed doubles
Year	Tournament	Partner	Opponent	Score	Result
1963	Nordic Championships	(Denmark) Ulla Rasmussen	(Denmark) Ole Mertz (Denmark) Karin Jørgensen	15–13, 15–8	(gold) Winner
1965	Swedish Open	(Denmark) Ulla Strand	(Sweden) Berndt Dahlberg (Sweden) Gunilla Dahlström	15–9, 15–9	(gold) Winner
1966	Swedish Open	(Denmark) Ulla Strand	(Denmark) Per Walsøe (Denmark) Pernille Mølgaard Hansen	7–15, 15–9, 8–15	(silver) Runner-up
1966	Nordic Championships	(Denmark) Karin Jørgensen	(Denmark) Per Walsøe (Denmark) Ulla Strand	1–15, 9–15	(silver) Runner-up
1967	Swedish Open	(Denmark) Ulla Strand	(Denmark) Per Walsøe (Denmark) Pernille Mølgaard Hansen	6–15, 15–11, 4–15	(silver) Runner-up
1967	Nordic Championships	(Denmark) Lizbeth von Barnekow	(Denmark) Erland Kops (Denmark) Ulla Strand	15–8, 14–17, 13–15	(silver) Runner-up
1969	Denmark Open	(Denmark) Imre Rietveld Nielsen	(Denmark) Per Walsøe (Denmark) Pernille Mølgaard Hansen	15–12, 15–7	(gold) Winner
1969	Nordic Championships	(Denmark) Imre Rietveld Nielsen	(Denmark) Per Walsøe (Denmark) Pernille Mølgaard Hansen	12–15, 13–15	(silver) Runner-up
1970	Denmark Open	(Denmark) Imre Rietveld Nielsen	(Denmark) Klaus Kaagaard (Denmark) Ulla Strand	11–15, 18–13, 10–15	(silver) Runner-up
1974	Swedish Open	(Denmark) Ulla Strand	(West Germany) Roland Maywald (West Germany) Brigitte Steden	7–15, 6–15	(silver) Runner-up
