= Imre Rietveld =

Dutch-born Danish badminton player

Imre Rietveld Nielsen
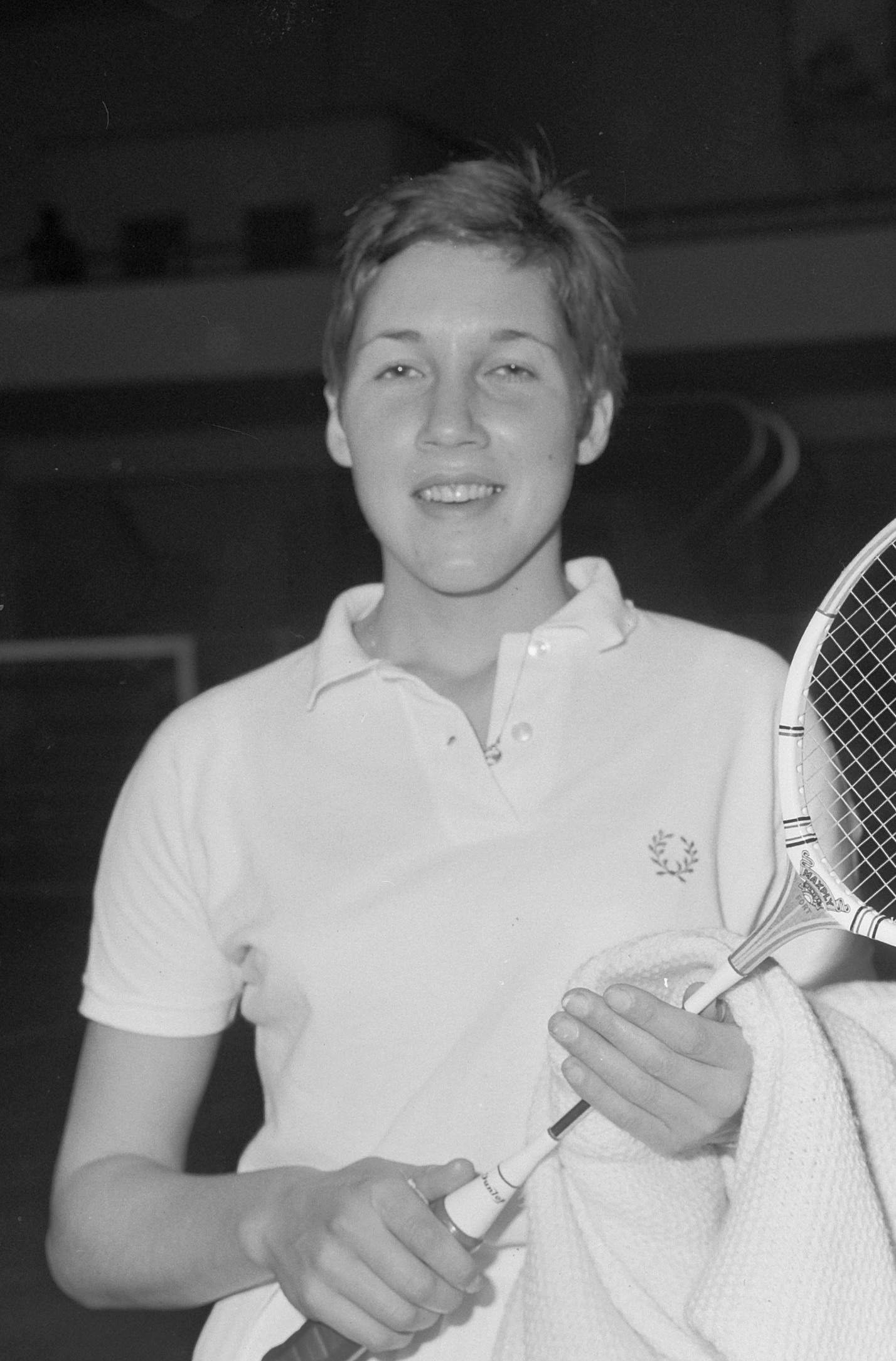
- Rietveld in 1963

Sport
- Country: Netherlands (1960-1967); Denmark (1967-1977)
- Sport: Badminton
Medal record
Women's badminton
Representing Denmark
European Championships
Silver medal – second place	1970 Port Talbot	Women's singles

Imre Rietveld is a retired Dutch-born Danish badminton player who won six French Open titles between 1963 and 1967.

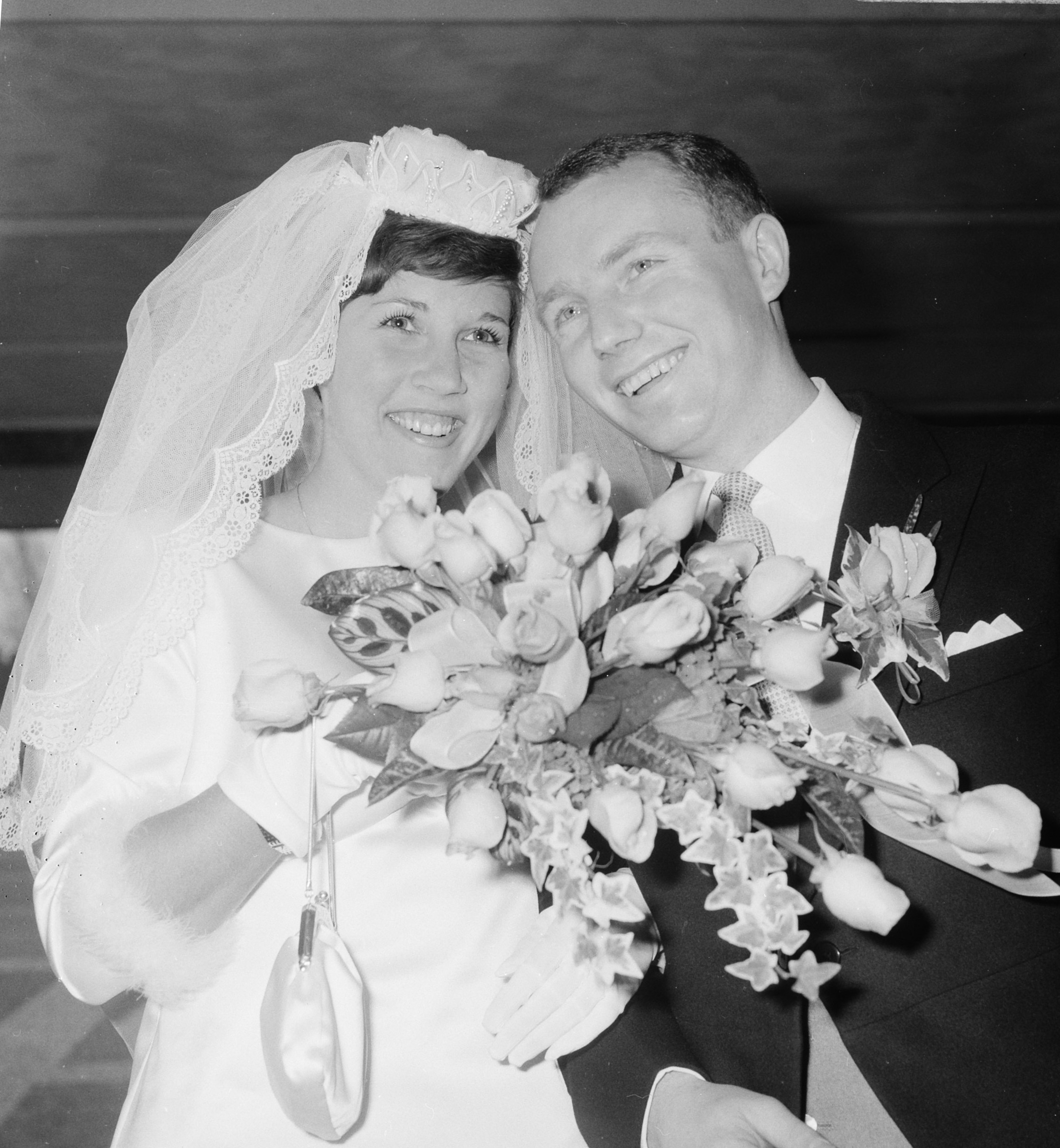
Imre Rietveld and Knud Aage Nielsen were married on 17 April 1967

In 1967 she married Knud Aage Nielsen, a Danish badminton player. After that she competed for Denmark as Imre Rietveld Nielsen or Imre Nielsen, winning the Belgian International and Denmark Open in 1969, as well as a silver medal at the 1970 European Badminton Championships.

== Achievements ==
=== European Championships ===
Women's singles
Year	Venue	Opponent	Score	Result
1970	Afan Lido, Port Talbot, Wales	(Sweden) Eva Twedberg	8–11, 12–10, 10–12	Silver

=== International tournaments (13 titles, 19 runners-up) ===
Women's singles
Year	Tournament	Opponent	Score	Result
1964	French Open	(Netherlands) Agnes Geene	12–11, 11–1	(gold) Winner
1966	All England Open	(United States) Judy Hashman	6–11, 7–11	(silver) Runner-up
1966	French Open	(Denmark) Marianne Svensson	11–5, 11–6	(gold) Winner
1967	Swedish Open	(Denmark) Ulla Strand	6–11, 11–4, 6–11	(silver) Runner-up
1967	Denmark Open	(Japan) Noriko Takagi	5–11, 3–11	(silver) Runner-up
1967	Dutch Open	(England) Angela Bairstow	11–10, 11–5	(gold) Winner
1969	Nordic Championships	(Sweden) Eva Twedberg	12–9, 11–9	(gold) Winner
1970	Belgian International	(Sweden) Eva Twedberg	12–10, 7–11, 12–10	(gold) Winner
1972	Nordic Championships	(Sweden) Eva Twedberg	8–11, 9–12	(silver) Runner-up
1973	German Open	(Sweden) Eva Twedberg	7–11, 8–11	(silver) Runner-up
1973	Denmark Open	(Japan) Hiroe Yuki	7–11, 6–11	(silver) Runner-up
1975	Nordic Championships	(Denmark) Lene Køppen	2–11, 2–11	(silver) Runner-up

Women's doubles
Year	Tournament	Partner	Opponent	Score	Result
1963	French Open	(West Germany) Irmgard Latz	(Denmark) Bitten Nielsen (Belgium) June van der Willigen	15–6, 15–4	(gold) Winner
1964	German Open	(West Germany) Irmgard Latz	(England) Angela Bairstow (England) Jenny Pritchard	8–15, 8–15	(silver) Runner-up
1964	French Open	(England) Julie Charles	(Belgium) Bep Verstoep (Belgium) June van der Willigen	15–2, 15–8	(gold) Winner
1966	Denmark Open	(England) Heather Nielsen	(Denmark) Karin Jørgensen (Denmark) Ulla Strand	4–15, 12–15	(silver) Runner-up
1966	French Open	(England) Julie Charles	(England) J. Davy (England) Angela Lindsay	15–12, 15–5	(gold) Winner
1966	Dutch Open	(Netherlands) Agnes Geene	(England) Heather Nielsen (England) Jenny Horton	14–17, 3–15	(silver) Runner-up
1967	Swedish Open	(Sweden) Eva Twedberg	(Denmark) Lonny Funch (Denmark) Ulla Strand	9–15, 4–15	(silver) Runner-up
1967	Denmark Open	(Denmark) Ulla Strand	(Japan) Hiroe Amano (Japan) Noriko Takagi	12–15, 15–9, 8–15	(silver) Runner-up
1967	All England Open	(Denmark) Ulla Strand	(United States) Judy Hashman (England) Janet Brennan	11–15, 15–8, 15–4	(gold) Winner
1967	Dutch Open	(Denmark) Ulla Strand	(Denmark) Lizbeth von Barnekow (Denmark) Pernille Mølgaard Hansen	15–5, 15–4	(gold) Winner
1967	French Open	(England) Julie Charles	(West Germany) Gerda Schumacher (West Germany) Gudrun Ziebold	14–17, 15–10, 15–8	(gold) Winner
1969	Nordic Championships	(Denmark) Lonny Bostofte	(Denmark) Anne Flindt (Denmark) Pernille Mølgaard Hansen	7–15, 9–15	(silver) Runner-up
1970	Belgian International	(Denmark) Anne Berglund	(England) Margaret Boxall (England) Susan Whetnall	4–15, 6–15	(silver) Runner-up
1970	Swedish Open	(Denmark) Pernille Mølgaard Hansen	(England) Margaret Boxall (England) Gillian Perrin	9–15, 1–15	(silver) Runner-up
1972	Nordic Championships	(Denmark) Bente Flindt	(Denmark) Anne Berglund (Denmark) Lene Køppen	5–15, 14–17	(silver) Runner-up
1974	Nordic Championships	(Denmark) Lene Køppen	(Denmark) Anne Flindt (Denmark) Pernille Kaagaard	12–15, 15–10, 18–15	(gold) Winner
1977	Nordic Championships	(Denmark) Lonny Bostofte	(Denmark) Inge Borgstrøm (Denmark) Lene Køppen	10–15, 7–15	(silver) Runner-up

Mixed doubles
Year	Tournament	Partner	Opponent	Score	Result
1969	Denmark Open	(Denmark) Henning Borch	(Denmark) Per Walsøe (Denmark) Pernille Mølgaard Hansen	15–12, 15–7	(gold) Winner
1969	Nordic Championships	(Denmark) Henning Borch	(Denmark) Per Walsøe (Denmark) Pernille Mølgaard Hansen	12–15, 13–15	(silver) Runner-up
1970	Denmark Open	(Denmark) Henning Borch	(Denmark) Klaus Kaagaard (Denmark) Ulla Strand	11–15, 18–13, 10–15	(silver) Runner-up
