= Pernille Mølgaard Hansen =

Danish badminton player

Pernille Kaagaard
Personal information
- Born: Pernille Mølgaard Hansen; 1945

Sport
- Country: Denmark
- Sport: Badminton
Medal record
Women's badminton
Representing Denmark
European Championships
Bronze medal – third place	1974 Vienna	Women's doubles
European Mixed Team Championships
Silver medal – second place	1974 Vienna	Mixed team

Pernille Mølgaard Hansen later Kaagaard is a Danish former badminton player. In 1964 she won both the National Championship and National Under-18 Championship and followed this up with five more National titles and 34 caps for Denmark from 1965 to 1977. She is best known for her All England title triumph in 1970 with her mixed doubles partner Per Walsøe.

== Achievements ==
=== European Championships ===
Women's doubles

Year	Venue	Partner	Opponent	Score	Result
1974	Stadthalle, Vienna, Austria	(Denmark) Ulla Strand	(England) Nora Gardner (England) Susan Whetnall	8–15, 12–15	Bronze

=== International tournaments (32 titles, 30 runners-up) ===
Women's singles

Year	Tournament	Opponent	Score	Result
1964	Norwegian International	(Sweden) Eva Twedberg	11–2, 3–11, 11–6	(gold) Winner
1964	Nordic Championships	(Denmark) Ulla Rasmussen	8–11, 3–11	(silver) Runner-up
1965	Norwegian International	(Sweden) Eva Twedberg	8–11, 2–11	(silver) Runner-up
1969	U.S. Open	(Indonesia) Minarni	1–11, 2–11	(silver) Runner-up
1970	Nordic Championships	(Denmark) Lizbeth von Barnekow	7–11, 11–4, 3–11	(silver) Runner-up
1971	Nordic Championships	(Sweden) Eva Twedberg	11–3, 3–11, 11–12	(silver) Runner-up
1972	South African Championships	(South Africa) Deirdre Tyghe	1–11, 8–11	(silver) Runner-up
1972	Norwegian International	(Sweden) Eva Twedberg	11–6, 5–11, 0–11	(silver) Runner-up

Women's doubles

Year	Tournament	Partner	Opponent	Score	Result
1964	Swiss Open	(Switzerland) Dora Hörnlimann	(Belgium) June Vander Willigen (Belgium) Bep Verstoep	5–15, 4–15	(silver) Runner-up
1964	Norwegian International	(Denmark) Liselotte Nielsen	(Sweden) Eva Twedberg (Sweden) Gunilla Dahlström	9–15, 5–15	(silver) Runner-up
1964	Nordic Championships	(Denmark) Lizbeth von Barnekow	(Denmark) Karin Jørgensen (Denmark) Ulla Rasmussen	15–11, 18–14	(gold) Winner
1965	Norwegian International	(Denmark) Lonny Funch	(Sweden) Eva Twedberg (Sweden) Gunilla Dahlström	15–7, 17–14	(gold) Winner
1968	Swedish Open	(Denmark) Anne Flindt	(Denmark) Lonny Funch (Denmark) Ulla Strand	15–4, 6–15, 16–18	(silver) Runner-up
1968	Nordic Championships	(Denmark) Anne Flindt	(Sweden) Eva Twedberg (Sweden) Gunilla Dahlström	15–6, 15–11	(gold) Winner
1969	German Open	(Denmark) Anne Flindt	(West Germany) Gudrun Ziebold (West Germany) Marieluise Wackerow	15–5, 15–12	(gold) Winner
1969	Swedish Open	(Denmark) Anne Flindt	(England) Margaret Boxall (England) Susan Whetnall	15–4, 5–15, 10–15	(silver) Runner-up
1969	Nordic Championships	(Denmark) Anne Flindt	(Denmark) Lonny Bostofte (Denmark) Imre Rietveld Nielsen	15–7, 15–9	(gold) Winner
1970	Swedish Open	(Denmark) Imre Rietveld Nielsen	(England) Margaret Boxall (England) Gillian Perrin	9–15, 1–15	(silver) Runner-up
1970	Nordic Championships	(Denmark) Anne Flindt	(Denmark) Lizbeth von Barnekow (Denmark) Lene Køppen	15–8, 15–1	(gold) Winner
1971	German Open	(Denmark) Anne Flindt	(Netherlands) Joke van Beusekom (Netherlands) Agnes van der Meulen	15–10, 15–8	(gold) Winner
1971	Swedish Open	(Denmark) Anne Flindt	(England) Margaret Beck (England) Gillian Gilks	14–17, 14–18	(silver) Runner-up
1971	Norwegian International	(Denmark) Lene Køppen	(Denmark) Annie Bøg Jørgensen (Denmark) Lotte Berend	15–5, 15–6	(gold) Winner
1971	Nordic Championships	(Denmark) Anne Flindt	(Denmark) Karin Jørgensen (Denmark) Ulla Strand	walkover	(gold) Winner
1972	German Open	(Denmark) Anne Flindt	(Netherlands) Marjan Ridder (Netherlands) Joke van Beusekom	14–17, 15–10, 15–9	(gold) Winner
1972	Canadian Open	(Denmark) Anne Berglund	(Canada) Marjory Shedd (Canada) Barbara Welch	15–0, 15–4	(gold) Winner
1972	U.S. Open	(Denmark) Anne Berglund	(United States) Polly Bretzke (United States) Pam Bristol Brady	15–10, 10–15, 15–9	(gold) Winner
1972	Swedish Open	(Denmark) Anne Flindt	(England) Margaret Beck (England) Gillian Gilks	8–15, 8–15	(silver) Runner-up
1972	Norwegian International	(Denmark) Anne Flindt	(Denmark) Karin Jørgensen (Denmark) Ulla Strand	15–10, 15–10	(gold) Winner
1973	Norwegian International	(Denmark) Lene Køppen	(Scotland) Joanna Flockhart (Scotland) Christine Stewart	12–15, 17–15, 15–6	(gold) Winner
1973	Nordic Championships	(Denmark) Ulla Strand	(Denmark) Lonny Bostofte (Denmark) Lene Køppen	15–12, 15–10	(gold) Winner
1974	Denmark Open	(Denmark) Ulla Strand	(Japan) Machiko Aizawa (Japan) Etsuko Takenaka	15–18, 12–15	(silver) Runner-up
1974	Nordic Championships	(Denmark) Anne Flindt	(Denmark) Lene Køppen (Denmark) Imre Rietveld Nielsen	15–12, 10–15, 15–18	(silver) Runner-up
1976	Norwegian International	(Denmark) Inge Borgstrøm	(Denmark) Susanne Mølgaard (Denmark) Pia Nielsen	15–5, 15–9	(gold) Winner
1976	Nordic Championships	(Denmark) Inge Borgstrøm	(Denmark) Lene Køppen (Denmark) Pia Nielsen	15–10, 9–15, 16–18	(silver) Runner-up

Mixed doubles

Year	Tournament	Partner	Opponent	Score	Result
1965	Norwegian International	(Denmark) Morten Pommergaard	(Sweden) Bengt-Åke Jönsson (Sweden) Gunilla Dahlström	8–15, 15–6, 15–11	(gold) Winner
1966	All England Open	(Denmark) Per Walsøe	(Denmark) Finn Kobberø (Denmark) Ulla Strand	13–15, 3–15	(silver) Runner-up
1966	Swedish Open	(Denmark) Per Walsøe	(Denmark) Henning Borch (Denmark) Ulla Strand	15–7, 9–15, 15–8	(gold) Winner
1966	Denmark Open	(Denmark) Per Walsøe	(Denmark) Finn Kobberø (Denmark) Ulla Strand	15–8, 7–15, 11–15	(silver) Runner-up
1967	All England Open	(Denmark) Per Walsøe	(Denmark) Svend Pri (Denmark) Ulla Strand	2–15, 10–15	(silver) Runner-up
1967	Swedish Open	(Denmark) Per Walsøe	(Denmark) Henning Borch (Denmark) Ulla Strand	15–6, 11–15, 15–4	(gold) Winner
1967	Denmark Open	(Denmark) Per Walsøe	(Denmark) Svend Pri (Denmark) Ulla Strand	11–15, 12–15	(silver) Runner-up
1968	German Open	(Denmark) Per Walsøe	(England) Tony Jordan (England) Susan Pound	10–15, 17–18	(silver) Runner-up
1968	Swedish Open	(Denmark) Per Walsøe	(Denmark) Svend Pri (Denmark) Ulla Strand	5–15, 11–15	(silver) Runner-up
1968	Denmark Open	(Denmark) Per Walsøe	(Denmark) Svend Pri (Denmark) Ulla Strand	15–2, 15–8	(gold) Winner
1968	Nordic Championships	(Denmark) Poul-Erik Nielsen	(Denmark) Elo Hansen (Denmark) Karin Jørgensen	15–10, 7–15, 15–9	(gold) Winner
1969	German Open	(Denmark) Per Walsøe	(England) Tony Jordan (England) Susan Whetnall	11–15, 15–13, 10–15	(silver) Runner-up
1969	U.S. Open	(Denmark) Erland Kops	(United States) Donald C. Paup (United States) Helen Tibbetts	15–6, 13–15, 15–7	(gold) Winner
1969	Swedish Open	(Denmark) Per Walsøe	(England) Roger Mills (England) Gillian Perrin	12–15, 7–15	(silver) Runner-up
1969	Denmark Open	(Denmark) Per Walsøe	(Denmark) Henning Borch (Denmark) Imre Rietveld Nielsen	12–15, 7–15	(silver) Runner-up
1969	Nordic Championships	(Denmark) Per Walsøe	(Denmark) Henning Borch (Denmark) Imre Rietveld Nielsen	15–12, 15–13	(gold) Winner
1970	All England Open	(Denmark) Per Walsøe	(West Germany) Wolfgang Bochow (West Germany) Irmgard Latz	17–14, 15–12	(gold) Winner
1970	Swedish Open	(Denmark) Per Walsøe	(Denmark) Elo Hansen (Denmark) Karin Jørgensen	3–15, 15–5, 15–8	(gold) Winner
1971	Swedish Open	(Denmark) Per Walsøe	(England) Derek Talbot (England) Gillian Gilks	15–5, 6–15, 14–17	(silver) Runner-up
1971	Nordic Championships	(Denmark) Per Walsøe	(Denmark) Svend Pri (Denmark) Ulla Strand	walkover	(gold) Winner
1972	German Open	(Denmark) Steen Skovgaard	(West Germany) Wolfgang Bochow (West Germany) Marieluise Wackerow	6–15, 4–15	(silver) Runner-up
1972	Canadian Open	(Denmark) Flemming Delfs	(England) Elliot Stuart (Sweden) Eva Twedberg	15–11, 18–17	(gold) Winner
1972	U.S. Open	(Denmark) Flemming Delfs	(England) Elliot Stuart (Sweden) Eva Twedberg	15–5, 15–1	(gold) Winner
1972	Norwegian International	(Denmark) Per Walsøe	(Denmark) Klaus Kaagaard (Denmark) Anne Flindt	15–8, 15–3	(gold) Winner
1972	Nordic Championships	(Denmark) Per Walsøe	(Denmark) Elo Hansen (Denmark) Ulla Strand	11–15, 11–15	(silver) Runner-up
1974	Nordic Championships	(Denmark) Elo Hansen	(Denmark) Poul Petersen (Denmark) Anne Flindt	15–12, 15–12	(gold) Winner
1976	Norwegian International	(Denmark) Elo Hansen	(Denmark) Mogens Neergaard (Denmark) Lilli B. Petersen	15–1, 15–8	(gold) Winner
1976	Nordic Championships	(Denmark) Elo Hansen	(Denmark) Steen Skovgaard (Denmark) Lene Køppen	0–15, 6–15	(silver) Runner-up
