= David Horton (badminton) =

English badminton player

Personal information
- Nationality: British (English)
- Born: Q4. 1939 Southend-on-Sea, Essex, England

Sport
- Club: Essex Badminton Club
Medal record
Men's badminton
Representing England
Commonwealth Games
Bronze medal – third place	1966 Kingston	Men's doubles

David O Horton (born Q4. 1939), is a male former international badminton player who competed for England.

== Badminton career ==
Horton is a two times National champion, winning the English National Badminton Championships in the mixed doubles in 1967 with Jenny Horton and the men's doubles with Roger Mills. In addition he has won the 1965 & 1967 Irish Open, and four Scottish Open titles.

He represented the England team in the singles, doubles and mixed (winning a bronze medal in the men's doubles with Mills), at the 1966 British Empire and Commonwealth Games in Kingston, Jamaica.

He represented Essex at county level.

== Personal life ==
He married fellow international player Jenny Pritchard in 1965.

== Achievements ==
=== Commonwealth Games ===
Men's doubles
Year	Venue	Partner	Opponent	Score	Result
1966	Convention Hall, Kingston, Jamaica	(England) Roger Mills	(England) Colin Beacom (England) Tony Jordan	15–9, 12–15, 18–17	Bronze

=== International tournaments (8 titles, 5 runners-up) ===
Men's doubles
Year	Tournament	Partner	Opponent	Score	Result
1965	Scottish Open	(England) Michael Rawlings	(Scotland) Robert McCoig (Scotland) Frank Shannon	15–10, 11–15, 11–15	(silver) Runner-up
1965	Irish Open	(England) Roger Mills	(England) Colin Beacom (England) Tony Jordan	12–15, 15–9, 15–10	(gold) Winner
1966	Scottish Open	(England) Roger Mills	(Scotland) Mac Henderson (Malaysia) Oon Chong Hau	15–10, 15–4	(gold) Winner
1966	German Open	(England) Tony Jordan	(Denmark) Poul-Erik Nielsen (Denmark) Per Walsøe	4–15, 5–15	(silver) Runner-up
1967	Irish Open	(England) Roger Mills	(England) Colin Beacom (England) Tony Jordan	15–8, 3–15, 18–15	(gold) Winner
1967	Scottish Open	(England) Tony Jordan	(Scotland) Robert McCoig (Scotland) Mac Henderson	7–15, 6–15	(silver) Runner-up
1968	Scottish Open	(England) Tony Jordan	(England) David Eddy (England) Roger Powell	15–11, 6–15, 5–15	(silver) Runner-up
1970	Scottish Open	(England) Elliot Stuart	(England) David Eddy (England) Derek Talbot	13–18, 15–5, 15–9	(gold) Winner
1970	Belgian International	(England) Elliot Stuart	(Denmark) Tom Bacher (Denmark) Poul Petersen	5–15, 15–10, 15–1	(gold) Winner
1971	Scottish Open	(England) Elliot Stuart	(Scotland) Fraser Gow (Scotland) Robert McCoig	15–8, 15–13	(gold) Winner
1972	Scottish Open	(England) Elliot Stuart	(Scotland) Fraser Gow (Scotland) Robert McCoig	15–12, 10–15, 11–15	(silver) Runner-up

Mixed doubles
Year	Tournament	Partner	Opponent	Score	Result
1966	Dutch Open	(England) Jenny Horton	(England) Paul Whetnall (England) Julie Charles	15–3, 15–4	(gold) Winner
1967	Scottish Open	(England) Jenny Horton	(Scotland) Robert McCoig (Scotland) M. Tait	15–6, 15–13	(gold) Winner
