= Margaret Boxall =

English badminton player

Personal information
- Nationality: British (English)
- Born: Q2. 1945 Hampshire, England

Sport
- Sport: Badminton
- Handedness: Left
Medal record
Women's badminton
Representing England
Commonwealth Games
Gold medal – first place	1970 Edinburgh	Women's doubles
Gold medal – first place	1970 Edinburgh	Mixed doubles
Silver medal – second place	1974 Christchurch	Women's doubles
Bronze medal – third place	1970 Edinburgh	Women's singles
European Championships
Gold medal – first place	1968 Bochum	Women's doubles
Gold medal – first place	1970 Port Talbot	Women's doubles
Bronze medal – third place	1970 Port Talbot	Women's singles

Margaret B. Boxall (born 1945; later Margaret Allen) is an English retired badminton player.

== Personal life ==
Boxall married to Eddie Allen, a South African badminton player on 9 August 1975 in her hometown Gosport, Hampshire.

== Career ==
Boxall won the women's doubles with Susan Whetnall at the prestigious All-England Championships in both 1969 and 1970.

She also won the gold medal at the 1968 and the 1970 European Badminton Championships in women's doubles with Susan Whetnall.

Boxall represented the England team at the 1970 British Commonwealth Games in Edinburgh, Scotland. She competed in the badminton events, winning double gold and a bronze medal.

Four years later she won a silver medal in the doubles at the 1974 British Commonwealth Games in Christchurch, New Zealand.

== Achievements ==
=== Commonwealth Games ===
Women's singles
Year	Venue	Opponent	Score	Result
1970	Meadowbank Stadium, Edinburgh, Scotland	(Malaysia) Sylvia Ng	11–6, 11–8	Bronze

Women's doubles
Year	Venue	Partner	Opponent	Score	Result
1970	Meadowbank Stadium, Edinburgh, Scotland	(England) Susan Whetnall	(England) Julie Rickard (England) Gillian Perrin	15–9, 15–2	Gold
1974	Cowles Stadium, Christchurch, New Zealand	(England) Susan Whetnall	(England) Margaret Beck (England) Gillian Perrin	7–15, 5–15	Silver

Mixed doubles
Year	Venue	Partner	Opponent	Score	Result
1970	Meadowbank Stadium, Edinburgh, Scotland	(England) Derek Talbot	(England) Roger Mills (England) Gillian Perrin	8–15, 15–12, 15–12	Gold

=== European Championships ===
Women's singles
Year	Venue	Opponent	Score	Result
1970	Afan Lido, Port Talbot, Wales	(Denmark) Imre Nielsen	9–11, 11–7, 3–11	Bronze

Women's doubles
Year	Venue	Partner	Opponent	Score	Result
1968	Bochum, West Germany	(England) Susan Pound	(England) Angela Bairstow (England) Gillian Perrin	15–7, 18–13	Gold
1970	Port Talbot, Wales	(England) Susan Whetnall	(Germany) Irmgard Latz (Germany) Marieluise Wackerow	2–3, retired	Gold

=== International tournament (19 titles, 10 runners-up) ===
Women's singles
Year	Tournament	Opponent	Score	Result
1969	South African Championships	(England) Gillian Perrin	1–11, 11–8, 4–11	(silver) Runner-up
1969	Scottish Open	(England) Susan Whetnall	8–11, 11–4, 12–10	(gold) Winner
1970	Scottish Open	(England) Gillian Perrin	11–9, 11–1	(gold) Winner
1970	Canadian Open	(United States) Tyna Barinaga	3–11, 4–11	(silver) Runner-up

Women's doubles
Year	Tournament	Partner	Opponent	Score	Result
1967	Irish Open	(England) Susan Pound	(England) Gillian Perrin (England) Iris Rogers	15–8, 15–7	(gold) Winner
1968	Scottish Open	(England) Susan Pound	(England) Jenny Horton (England) Ursula Smith	9–15, 9–15	(silver) Runner-up
1968	Dutch Open	(England) Susan Pound	(England) Angela Bairstow (New Zealand) Alison Glenie	5–15, 15–0, 15–9	(gold) Winner
1968	German Open	(England) Susan Pound	(West Germany) Irmgard Latz (West Germany) Marieluise Wackerow	15–6, 15–7	(gold) Winner
1969	All England Open	(England) Susan Whetnall	(Japan) Hiroe Amano (Japan) Tomoko Takahashi	15–11, 15–11	(gold) Winner
1969	Irish Open	(England) Susan Whetnall	(Republic of Ireland) Mary Bryan (Republic of Ireland) Yvonne Kelly	15–3, 15–10	(gold) Winner
1969	South African Championships	(England) Susan Whetnall	(South Africa) Wilma Prade (South Africa) Ann Smith	15–6, 15–4	(gold) Winner
1969	Swedish Open	(England) Susan Whetnall	(Denmark) Anne Flindt (Denmark) Pernille Mølgaard Hansen	4–15, 15–5, 15–10	(gold) Winner
1969	Scottish Open	(England) Susan Whetnall	(Republic of Ireland) Mary Bryan (Republic of Ireland) Yvonne Kelly	15–4, 15–6	(gold) Winner
1970	Belgian International	(England) Susan Whetnall	(Denmark) Imre Rietveld Nielsen (Denmark) Anne Berglund	15–4, 15–6	(gold) Winner
1970	Swedish Open	(England) Gillian Perrin	(Denmark) Pernille Molgaard Hansen (Denmark) Imre Rietveld Nielsen	15–9, 15–1	(gold) Winner
1970	All England Open	(England) Susan Whetnall	(England) Gillian Perrin (England) Julie Rickard	15–6, 8–15, 15–9	(gold) Winner
1970	Canadian Open	(England) Susan Whetnall	(United States) Tyna Barinaga (United States) Caroline Hein	15–5, 5–15, 15–13	(gold) Winner
1970	U.S. Open	(England) Susan Whetnall	(Japan) Machiko Aizawa (Japan) Etsuko Takenaka	10–15, 11–15	(silver) Runner-up
1970	Dutch Open	(England) Susan Whetnall	(Germany) Irmgard Latz (Germany) Marieluise Wackerow	18–15, 12–15, 15–1	(gold) Winner
1970	Scottish Open	(England) Susan Whetnall	(England) Margaret Beck (England) Gillian Perrin	15–2, 15–18, 15–5	(gold) Winner
1974	All England Open	(England) Susan Whetnall	(England) Margaret Beck (England) Gillian Gilks	5–15, 14–18	(silver) Runner-up
1974	Scottish Open	(England) Susan Whetnall	(England) Margaret Beck (England) Gillian Gilks	15–9, 10–15, 15–10	(gold) Winner

Mixed doubles
Year	Tournament	Partner	Opponent	Score	Result
1968	Dutch Open	(England) David Eddy	(England) Paul Whetnall (England) Angela Bairstow	13–15, 11–15	(silver) Runner-up
1970	Dutch Open	(England) David Eddy	(England) Derek Talbot (England) Gillian Perrin	14–18, 8–15	(silver) Runner-up
1970	Scottish Open	(England) Paul Whetnall	(England) Roger Mills (England) Gillian Perrin	2–15, 15–11, 8–15	(silver) Runner-up
1970	Belgian International	(England) Paul Whetnall	(South Africa) Alan Parsons (Germany) Lore Hawig	15–4, 15–5	(gold) Winner
1970	Canadian Open	(England) Paul Whetnall	(Japan) Ippei Kojima (England) Susan Whetnall	15–12, 5–15, 13–15	(silver) Runner-up
1970	U.S. Open	(England) Paul Whetnall	(Japan) Ippei Kojima (Japan) Machiko Aizawa	15–8, 15–2	(gold) Winner
1974	Scottish Open	(England) Mike Tredgett	(England) Paul Whetnall (England) Nora Gardner	4–15, 14–18	(silver) Runner-up
