= Agnes Geene =

Dutch badminton player

Agnes van der Meulen
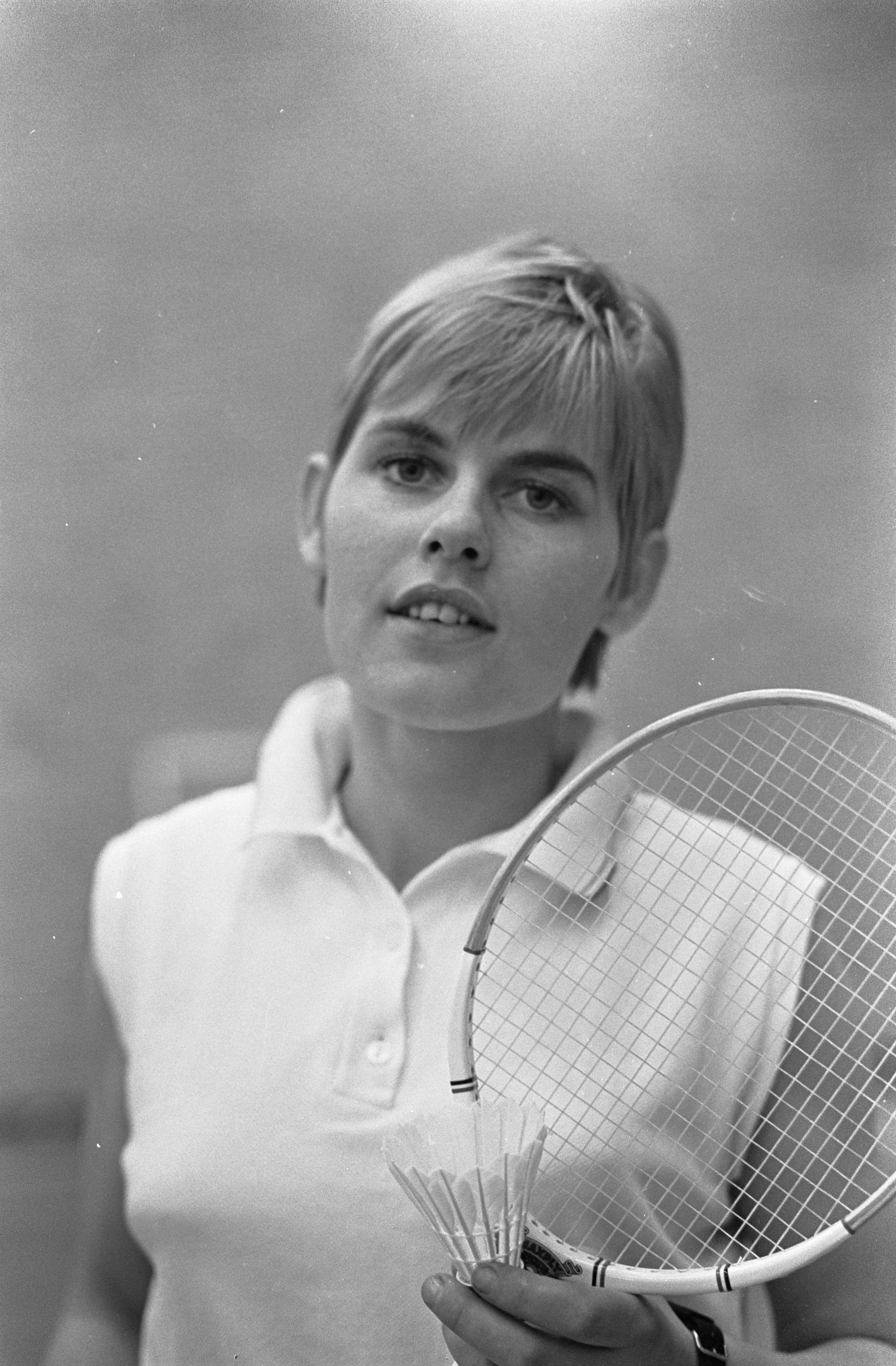
- Geene in 1968

Personal information
- Birth name: Agnes Geene
- Country: Netherlands
- Born: 1947 (age 77–78)
Medal record
Women's badminton
Representing Netherlands
European Championships
Bronze medal – third place	1968 Bochum	Women's doubles

Agnes Geene (born 1947, married name Agnes van der Meulen) is a Dutch badminton player.

== Career ==
Agnes Geene won the junior championships in the Netherlands in 1964. In the following year, she succeeded as a senior for the first time. She was able to win both the ladies' double and the ladies' single championships. Six more titles followed until 1974. She won bronze at the 1968 European Badminton Championships in the Women's doubles.

== Results ==
Season	Event	Discipline	Place	Name
1964	Netherlands: Individual Championships der Junioren	Ladies singles	1	Agnes Geene
1965	Netherlands: Individual Championships	Ladies doubles	1	Agnes Geene / Imre Rietveld
1965	Netherlands: Individual Championships	Ladies singles	1	Agnes Geene
1966	Netherlands: Individual Championships	Ladies singles	1	Agnes Geene
1967	Netherlands: Individual Championships	Ladies doubles	1	Marja Ridder / Agnes Geene
1968	Netherlands: Individual Championships	Ladies singles	1	Agnes Geene
1968	European Badminton Championships	Ladies doubles	3	Agnes Geene / Joke van Beusekom
1972	Netherlands: Individual Championships	Ladies doubles	1	Lily ter Metz / Agnes van der Meulen
1973	Netherlands: Individual Championships	Ladies singles	1	Agnes van der Meulen
1974	Netherlands: Individual Championships	Ladies doubles	1	Marja Ridder / Agnes van der Meulen
