= Trevor Coates =

English badminton player

Personal information
- Nationality: British (English)
- Born: 1940 (age 84–85); Bristol

Colin Trevor Coates (born 1940) is a former English badminton international player and a former national champion.

== Biography ==
Coates became the English National doubles champion after winning the inaugural English National Badminton Championships in 1964.

Coates represented Derbyshire and played 19 times for England and was also twice Irish Open champion in 1959 and 1961.
