= 1977 IBF World Championships – Men's doubles =

Men's doubles at the 1977 IBF World Championships
- Venue: Malmö Isstadion
- Location: Malmö, Sweden
- Dates: May 3, 1977 – May 8, 1977

Medalists
| gold medal | Tjun Tjun; Johan Wahjudi | Indonesia |
| silver medal | Christian Hadinata; Ade Chandra | Indonesia |
| bronze medal | Bengt Fröman; Thomas Kihlström | Sweden |
| bronze medal | Ray Stevens; Mike Tredgett | England |

The 1977 IBF World Championships took place 1977 in Malmö, Sweden. Following the results of the men's doubles. (Note: Results of the first rounds incomplete.)

== Main stage ==
=== Section 1 ===
First round
(Indonesia) Tjun Tjun (Indonesia) Johan Wahjudi
(India) Uday Pawar (India) Pradeep Gandhe
(Iceland) Sigurdur Haraldsson (Iceland) Johann Kjartansson
(England) David Eddy (England) Eddy Sutton
(Denmark) Gert Hansen (Denmark) Jesper Helledie

Second round
(Indonesia) Tjun Tjun (Indonesia) Johan Wahjudi
(India) Uday Pawar (India) Pradeep Gandhe | 15 | 15
(Iceland) Sigurdur Haraldsson (Iceland) Johann Kjartansson | 8 | 4
(England) David Eddy (England) Eddy Sutton | 15 | 15
(Denmark) Gert Hansen (Denmark) Jesper Helledie | 12 | 13

Third round
(Indonesia) Tjun Tjun (Indonesia) Johan Wahjudi
(India) Uday Pawar (India) Pradeep Gandhe
(England) David Eddy (England) Eddy Sutton

Quarterfinals
(Indonesia) Tjun Tjun (Indonesia) Johan Wahjudi | 15 | 15
(England) David Eddy (England) Eddy Sutton | 14 | 5

=== Section 2 ===
First round
(Sweden) Bengt Fröman (Sweden) Thomas Kihlström
(Australia) Peter Cooper (New Zealand) Bryan Purser
(Germany) Wolfgang Bochow (Germany) Michael Schnaase
(Belgium) Jean Pierre Bauduin (Belgium) Daniel Gosset
(Canada) Pat Tryon (Canada) Ian Johnson
(Zambia) Judien Lawes (Zambia) Malcolm Abraham
(Japan) Nobutaka Ikeda (Japan) Shoichi Toganoo
(Mexico) Victor Jaramillo (Mexico) Ricardo Jaramillo

Second round
(Sweden) Bengt Fröman (Sweden) Thomas Kihlström | 15 | 18 | 15
(Australia) Peter Cooper (New Zealand) Bryan Purser | 18 | 15 | 8
(Germany) Wolfgang Bochow (Germany) Michael Schnaase | 15 | 15
(Belgium) Jean Pierre Bauduin (Belgium) Daniel Gosset | 3 | 5
(Canada) Pat Tryon (Canada) Ian Johnson | 15 | 15
(Zambia) Judien Lawes (Zambia) Malcolm Abraham | 0 | 1
(Japan) Nobutaka Ikeda (Japan) Shoichi Toganoo | w.o.
(Mexico) Victor Jaramillo (Mexico) Ricardo Jaramillo

Third round
(Sweden) Bengt Fröman (Sweden) Thomas Kihlström
(Germany) Wolfgang Bochow (Germany) Michael Schnaase
(Canada) Pat Tryon (Canada) Ian Johnson
(Japan) Nobutaka Ikeda (Japan) Shoichi Toganoo

Quarterfinals
(Sweden) Bengt Fröman (Sweden) Thomas Kihlström | 15 | 15
(Canada) Pat Tryon (Canada) Ian Johnson | 2 | 8

=== Section 3 ===
First round
(Indonesia) Christian Hadinata (Indonesia) Ade Chandra
(Sweden) Stefan Karlsson (Sweden) Claes Nordin
(Chinese Taipei) Laio Kung-Fu (Chinese Taipei) Chung Trung-Lieh
(Japan) Kinji Zeniya (Japan) Masao Tsuchida
(Netherlands) Rob Ridder (Netherlands) Piet Ridder
(India) Prakash Padukone (India) Partho Ganguli
(Scotland) Billy Gilliland (Scotland) Gordon Hamilton

Second round
(Indonesia) Christian Hadinata (Indonesia) Ade Chandra
(Sweden) Stefan Karlsson (Sweden) Claes Nordin | 15 | 17
(Chinese Taipei) Laio Kung-Fu (Chinese Taipei) Chung Trung-Lieh | 8 | 15
(Japan) Kinji Zeniya (Japan) Masao Tsuchida | 15 | 15
(Netherlands) Rob Ridder (Netherlands) Piet Ridder | 8 | 9
(India) Prakash Padukone (India) Partho Ganguli | 18 | 10 | 18
(Scotland) Billy Gilliland (Scotland) Gordon Hamilton | 15 | 15 | 15

Third round
(Indonesia) Christian Hadinata (Indonesia) Ade Chandra
(Sweden) Stefan Karlsson (Sweden) Claes Nordin
(Japan) Kinji Zeniya (Japan) Masao Tsuchida
(India) Prakash Padukone (India) Partho Ganguli

Quarterfinals
(Indonesia) Christian Hadinata (Indonesia) Ade Chandra | 15 | 15
(Japan) Kinji Zeniya (Japan) Masao Tsuchida | 4 | 11

=== Section 4 ===
First round
(England) Ray Stevens (England) Mike Tredgett
(Zambia) Visnan Kapil (Zambia) Yagesh Pathak
(Mexico) Roy Díaz González (Mexico) Jorge Palazueloz
(Israel) Victor Yusim (Israel) A. Zacharia
(Denmark) Flemming Delfs (Denmark) Steen Skovgaard
(Germany) Roland Maywald (Germany) Willy Braun
(Canada) Greg Carter (Canada) Kevin Little
(Socialist Federal Republic of Yugoslavia) Gregor Berden (Socialist Federal Republic of Yugoslavia) Stane Koprivsek

Second round
(England) Ray Stevens (England) Mike Tredgett | 15 | 15
(Zambia) Visnan Kapil (Zambia) Yagesh Pathak | 4 | 2
(Mexico) Roy Díaz González (Mexico) Jorge Palazueloz | 15 | 15
(Israel) Victor Yusim (Israel) A. Zacharia | 1 | 5
(Denmark) Flemming Delfs (Denmark) Steen Skovgaard | 15 | 15
(Germany) Roland Maywald (Germany) Willy Braun | 11 | 9
(Canada) Greg Carter (Canada) Kevin Little | 15 | 15
(Socialist Federal Republic of Yugoslavia) Gregor Berden (Socialist Federal Republic of Yugoslavia) Stane Koprivsek | 1 | 5

Third round
(England) Ray Stevens (England) Mike Tredgett
(Mexico) Roy Díaz González (Mexico) Jorge Palazueloz
(Denmark) Flemming Delfs (Denmark) Steen Skovgaard
(Canada) Greg Carter (Canada) Kevin Little

Quarterfinals
(England) Ray Stevens (England) Mike Tredgett | 15 | 15
(Denmark) Flemming Delfs (Denmark) Steen Skovgaard | 10 | 6

== Final stage ==
Quarterfinals
(Indonesia) Tjun Tjun (Indonesia) Johan Wahjudi | 15 | 15
(England) David Eddy (England) Eddy Sutton | 14 | 5
(Sweden) Bengt Fröman (Sweden) Thomas Kihlström | 15 | 15
(Canada) Pat Tryon (Canada) Ian Johnson | 2 | 8
(Indonesia) Christian Hadinata (Indonesia) Ade Chandra | 15 | 15
(Japan) Kinji Zeniya (Japan) Masao Tsuchida | 4 | 11
(England) Ray Stevens (England) Mike Tredgett | 15 | 15
(Denmark) Flemming Delfs (Denmark) Steen Skovgaard | 10 | 6

Semifinals
(Indonesia) Tjun Tjun (Indonesia) Johan Wahjudi | 15 | 15
(Sweden) Bengt Fröman (Sweden) Thomas Kihlström | 7 | 11
(Indonesia) Christian Hadinata (Indonesia) Ade Chandra | 15 | 15
(England) Ray Stevens (England) Mike Tredgett | 8 | 10

Finals
(Indonesia) Tjun Tjun (Indonesia) Johan Wahjudi | 15 | 15
(Indonesia) Christian Hadinata (Indonesia) Ade Chandra | 6 | 4
