= Ray Stevens (badminton) =

English badminton player

Personal information
- Born: 23 June 1951 (age 75)

Sport
- Country: England
- Sport: Badminton
Medal record
Men's badminton
Representing England
World Championships
Bronze medal – third place	1977 Malmö	Men's doubles
Thomas Cup
Bronze medal – third place	1982 London	Men's team
Commonwealth Games
Gold medal – first place	1978 Edmonton	Men's doubles
Gold medal – first place	1978 Edmonton	Mixed team
Silver medal – second place	1974 Christchurch	Men's doubles
Bronze medal – third place	1978 Edmonton	Men's singles
European Championships
Gold medal – first place	1976 Dublin	Men's doubles
Gold medal – first place	1978 Preston	Men's doubles
Gold medal – first place	1972 Karlskrona	Mixed team
Gold medal – first place	1974 Vienna	Mixed team
Gold medal – first place	1978 Preston	Mixed team
Gold medal – first place	1982 Böblingen	Mixed team
Silver medal – second place	1982 Böblingen	Men's singles
Silver medal – second place	1976 Dublin	Mixed team
Silver medal – second place	1980 Groningen	Mixed team
Bronze medal – third place	1972 Karlskrona	Men's singles
Bronze medal – third place	1978 Preston	Men's singles
Bronze medal – third place	1980 Groningen	Men's singles
Bronze medal – third place	1974 Vienna	Men's doubles
Bronze medal – third place	1980 Groningen	Men's doubles
Bronze medal – third place	1982 Böblingen	Men's doubles
European Junior Championships
Gold medal – first place	1969 Leidschendam-Voorburg	Boys' doubles
Bronze medal – third place	1969 Leidschendam-Voorburg	Boys' singles
Bronze medal – third place	1969 Leidschendam-Voorburg	Mixed doubles

Raymond P. Stevens (born 23 June 1951) is an English badminton player and multiple National champion.

== Biography ==
A winner of numerous English national championships and international titles in both singles and doubles, his strengths were his power, tenacity, and concentration.

At the 1974 British Commonwealth Games in Christchurch, New Zealand, Stevens became stricken with a mild case of chicken pox, but was released from hospital just in time to compete in the men's doubles. He went on to win a silver medal.

In 1977, Stevens won a bronze medal in the World Championships in men's doubles. He is also won nine medals in the European Badminton Championships, including two gold medals in men's doubles. He was also twice a runner-up in men's doubles at the prestigious All-England Championships with longtime partner Mike Tredgett.

In 1981 Stevens set a new record by winning his fifth English National Badminton Championships singles title. The record stood until 1993 when his cousin Darren Hall won his sixth of ten titles.

== Achievements ==
=== World Championships ===
Men's doubles
Year	Venue	Partner	Opponent	Score	Result
1977	Malmö Isstadion, Malmö, Sweden	(England) Mike Tredgett	(Indonesia) Ade Chandra (Indonesia) Christian Hadinata	8–15, 10–15	Bronze

=== Commonwealth Games ===
Men's singles
Year	Venue	Opponent	Score	Result
1978	Clare Drake Arena, Edmonton, Alberta, Canada	(Malaysia) Saw Swee Leong	15–4, 15–11	Bronze

Men's doubles
Year	Venue	Partner	Opponent	Score	Result
1974	Cowles Stadium, Christchurch, New Zealand	(England) Mike Tredgett	(England) Elliot Stuart (England) Derek Talbot	6–15, 15–6, 11–15	Silver
1978	Clare Drake Arena, Edmonton, Alberta, Canada	(England) Mike Tredgett	(Malaysia) Moo Foot Lian (Malaysia) Ong Teong Boon	15–10, 15–5	Gold

=== European Championships ===
Men's singles
Year	Venue	Opponent	Score	Result
1972	Karlskrona Idrottshall, Karlskrona, Sweden	(West Germany) Wolfgang Bochow	4–15, 4–15	Bronze
1978	Guild Hall, Preston, England	(Sweden) Thomas Kihlström	15–7, 4–15, 8–15	Bronze
1980	Martinihal, Groningen, Netherlands	(Denmark) Flemming Delfs	7–15, 3–15	Bronze
1982	Sporthalle, Böblingen, West Germany	(Denmark) Jens Peter Nierhoff	9–15, 4–15	Silver

Men's doubles
Year	Venue	Partner	Opponent	Score	Result
1974	Stadthalle, Vienna, Austria	(England) Mike Tredgett	(Denmark) Poul Petersen (Denmark) Svend Pri	8–15, 8–15	Bronze
1976	Fitzwilliam Club, Dublin, Ireland	(England) Mike Tredgett	(England) Eddy Sutton (England) Derek Talbot	13–15, 15–12, 15–6	Gold
1978	Preston Guild Hall, Preston, England	(England) Mike Tredgett	(Sweden) Bengt Fröman (Sweden) Thomas Kihlström	15–6, 15–5	Gold
1980	Martinihal, Groningen, Netherlands	(England) Mike Tredgett	(Sweden) Bengt Fröman (Sweden) Thomas Kihlström	11–15, 10–15	Bronze
1982	Sporthalle, Böblingen, West Germany	(England) Andy Goode	(Sweden) Stefan Karlsson (Sweden) Thomas Kihlström	8–15, 4–15	Bronze

=== European Junior Championships ===
Boys' singles
Year	Venue	Opponent	Score	Result
1969	Sporthal de Vliegermolen, Leidschendam-Voorburg, Netherlands	(Denmark) Flemming Delfs	5–15, 7–15	Bronze

Boys' doubles
Year	Venue	Partner	Opponent	Score	Result
1969	Sporthal de Vliegermolen, Leidschendam-Voorburg, Netherlands	(England) Keith Arthur	(Denmark) Preben Boesen (Denmark) Mogens Neergaard	15–9, 15–4	Gold

Mixed doubles
Year	Venue	Partner	Opponent	Score	Result
1969	Sporthal de Vliegermolen, Leidschendam-Voorburg, Netherlands	(England) Margaret Beck	(Sweden) Gert Perneklo (Sweden) Karin Lindquist	–, –	Bronze

=== International tournaments (35 titles, 15 runners-up) ===
Men's singles
Year	Tournament	Opponent	Score	Result
1972	Scottish Open	(England) Derek Talbot	15–1, 3–15, 15–10	(gold) Winner
1973	Portugal International	(Denmark) Jørgen Mortensen	15–0, 15–12	(gold) Winner
1975	Canadian Open	(Sweden) Thomas Kihlström	1–15, 15–5, 15–10	(gold) Winner
1975	South African Championships	(England) Paul Whetnall	12–15, 11–15	(silver) Runner-up
1976	Scottish Open	(England) Paul Whetnall	5–15, 15–5, 11–15	(silver) Runner-up
1976	South African Championships	(England) Mike Tredgett	15–9, 15–5	(gold) Winner
1978	German Open	(Sweden) Stefan Karlsson	15–5, 15–8	(gold) Winner
1979	Bell's Open	(England) Kevin Jolly	15–8, 15–13	(gold) Winner
1980	Welsh International	(England) Nick Yates	12–15, 15–12, 17–14	(gold) Winner
1980	Bell's Open	(England) Steve Baddeley	7–15, 15–5, 15–6	(gold) Winner
1982	Portugal International	(Pakistan) Tariq Farooq	15–7, 15–12	(gold) Winner
1982	Dutch Open	(India) Prakash Padukone	15–5, 2–15, 2–15	(silver) Runner-up
1982	Bell's Open	(England) Steve Butler	15–10, 17–15	(gold) Winner

Men's doubles
Year	Tournament	Partner	Opponent	Score	Result
1972	Canadian Open	(England) Mike Tredgett	(England) Elliot Stuart (England) Derek Talbot	15–11, 15–13	(gold) Winner
1972	All England Open	(England) Mike Tredgett	(Indonesia) Ade Chandra (Indonesia) Christian Hadinata	5–15, 12–15	(silver) Runner-up
1973	Portugal International	(England) Elliot Stuart	(Denmark) Erland Kops (Denmark) Jørgen Mortensen	10–15, 15–7, 15–6	(gold) Winner
1974	Dutch Open	(England) Mike Tredgett	(England) Elliot Stuart (England) Derek Talbot	8–15, 15–12, 15–4	(gold) Winner
1974	Scottish Open	(England) Mike Tredgett	(Denmark) Tom Bacher (Malaysia) Punch Gunalan	9–15, 8–15	(silver) Runner-up
1974	German Open	(England) Mike Tredgett	(England) Elliot Stuart (England) Derek Talbot	12–15, 15–14, 5–15	(silver) Runner-up
1975	South African Championships	(England) Paul Whetnall	(South Africa) Kenneth Parsons (South Africa) William Kerr	15–9, 15–7	(gold) Winner
1975	Swedish Open	(England) Mike Tredgett	(Denmark) Jesper Helledie (Denmark) Jørgen Mortensen	15–6, 13–15, 15–6	(gold) Winner
1975	Dutch Open	(England) Mike Tredgett	(England) David Eddy (England) Eddy Sutton	15–12, 15–9	(gold) Winner
1975	Canadian Open	(England) Mike Tredgett	(Japan) Nobutaka Ikeda (Japan) Shoichi Toganoo	17–16, 12–15, 15–12	(gold) Winner
1975	Jamaica International	(England) Mike Tredgett	(Denmark) Flemming Delfs (Denmark) Elo Hansen	13–15, 15–4, 15–11	(gold) Winner
1976	Canadian Open	(England) Mike Tredgett	(Thailand) Bandid Jaiyen (Thailand) Surapong Suharitdamrong	12–15, 15–10, 15–6	(gold) Winner
1976	Scottish Open	(England) Mike Tredgett	(Scotland) Jim Ansari (Scotland) John Britton	15–7, 15–11	(gold) Winner
1976	German Open	(England) Mike Tredgett	(Sweden) Bengt Fröman (Sweden) Thomas Kihlström	15–17, 15–17	(silver) Runner-up
1976	South African Championships	(England) Mike Tredgett	(England) David Eddy (Netherlands) Rob Ridder	15–13, 15–9	(gold) Winner
1978	German Open	(England) Mike Tredgett	(Sweden) Ola Eriksson (Sweden) Christian Lundberg	6–15, 6–15	(silver) Runner-up
1978	Dutch Open	(England) Mike Tredgett	(Denmark) Jesper Helledie (Denmark) Svend Pri	15–9, 1–15, 5–15	(silver) Runner-up
1979	English Masters	(England) Mike Tredgett	(Sweden) Bengt Fröman (Sweden) Thomas Kihlström	16–18, 9–15	(silver) Runner-up
1979	Bell's Open	(England) David Eddy	(Scotland) Billy Gilliland (Scotland) Dan Travers	15–12, 15–5	(gold) Winner
1980	Welsh International	(England) Mike Tredgett	(Scotland) Billy Gilliland (Scotland) Dan Travers	7–15, 15–11, 15–6	(gold) Winner
1980	Scottish Open	(England) Mike Tredgett	(England) Kevin Jolly (England) Derek Talbot	15–4, 15–11	(gold) Winner
1980	All England Open	(England) Mike Tredgett	(Indonesia) Tjun Tjun (Indonesia) Johan Wahjudi	15–10, 9–15, 10–15	(silver) Runner-up
1980	Canadian Open	(England) Mike Tredgett	(Sweden) Claes Nordin (Sweden) Stefan Karlsson	15–9, 8–8 ret.	(gold) Winner
1980	Bell's Open	(England) Steve Baddeley	(Scotland) Billy Gilliland (Scotland) Dan Travers	15–9, 15–9	(gold) Winner
1981	Canadian Open	(Sweden) Thomas Kihlström	(England) Martin Dew (England) Steve Baddeley	15–8, 15–11	(gold) Winner
1981	Portugal International	(England) Derek Talbot	(Scotland) Billy Gilliland (England) Kevin Jolly	18–17, 12–15, 15–12	(gold) Winner
1982	Portugal International	(England) Darren Hall	(Scotland) Billy Gilliland (Scotland) Dan Travers	15–13, 15–8	(gold) Winner

Mixed doubles
Year	Tournament	Partner	Opponent	Score	Result
1971	Denmark Open	(Canada) Barbara Hood	(Denmark) Svend Pri (Denmark) Ulla Strand	13–15, 11–15	(silver) Runner-up
1973	Portugal International	(England) Barbara Giles	(England) Elliot Stuart (England) Nora Gardner	15–10, 14–15, 15–12	(gold) Winner
1975	South African Championships	(England) Barbara Giles	(England) Paul Whetnall (England) Susan Whetnall	15–6, 10–15, 3–15	(silver) Runner-up
1979	Denmark Open	(England) Nora Perry	(Denmark) Steen Skovgaard (Denmark) Lene Køppen	15–12, 11–15, 15–13	(gold) Winner
1979	Bell's Open	(England) Nora Perry	(Scotland) Billy Gilliland (England) Karen Puttick	15–12, 15–6	(gold) Winner
1980	Bell's Open	(England) Nora Perry	(Scotland) Gordon Hamilton (Scotland) Joanna Flockhart	15–4, 15–3	(gold) Winner
1981	Canadian Open	(England) Nora Perry	(Sweden) Thomas Kihlström (England) Gillian Gilks	15–12, 6–15, 0–15	(silver) Runner-up
1981	India Open	(England) Nora Perry	(Scotland) Billy Gilliland (England) Karen Chapman	15–12, 15–3	(gold) Winner
1982	Bell's Open	(England) Nora Perry	(Scotland) Billy Gilliland (England) Gillian Gilks	11–15, 7–7 ret.	(silver) Runner-up
1982	Portugal International	(England) Nora Perry	(Scotland) Billy Gilliland (Sweden) Eva Stuart	15–9, 15–9	(gold) Winner
