= Bengt Fröman =

Swedish badminton player (born 1950)

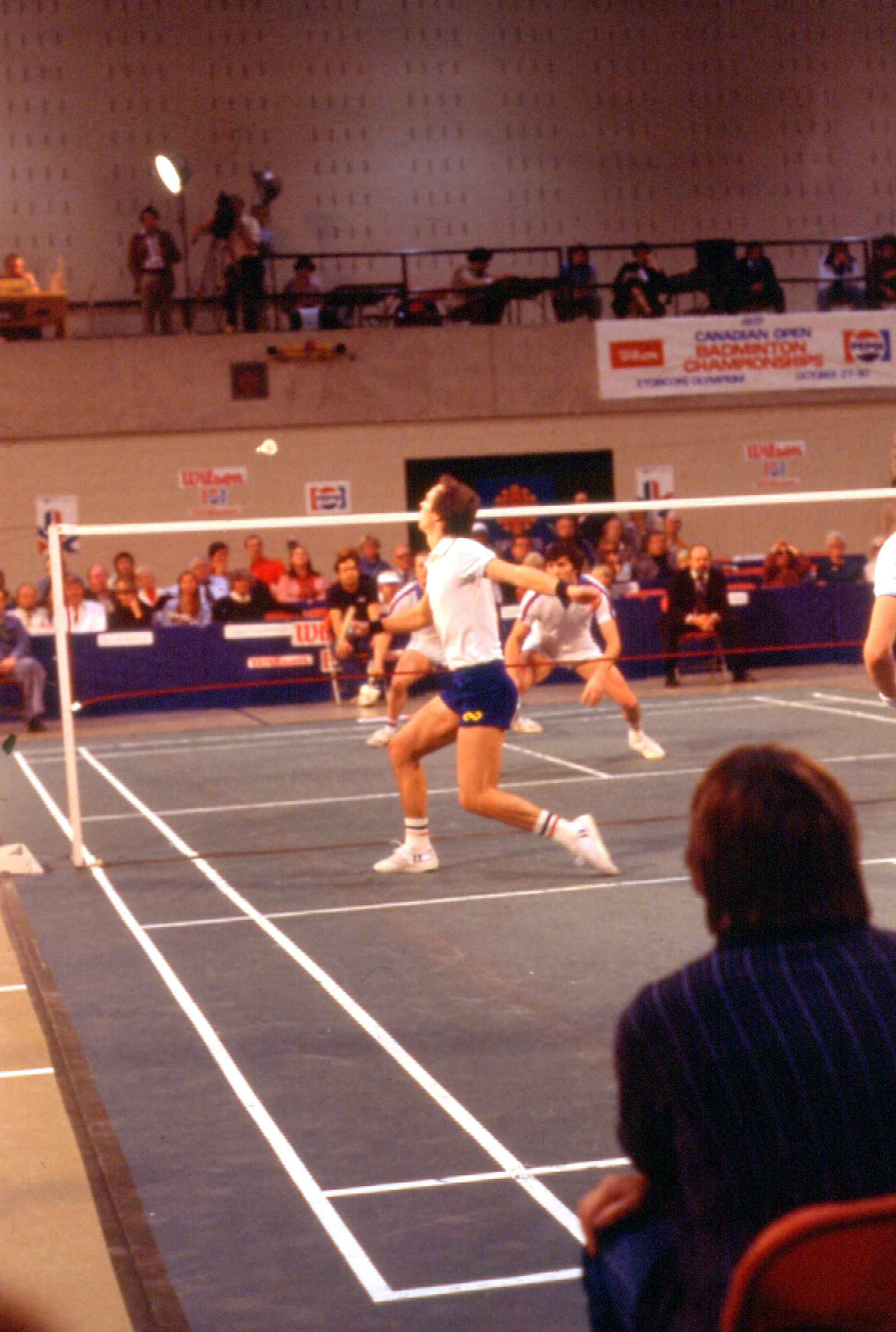
- Men's doubles at the Canadian Open 1977 in Badminton at Etobicoke Olympium with Thomas Kihlström and Bengt Fröman.

Personal information
- Born: 30 November 1950 (age 75)

Sport
- Country: Sweden
- Sport: Badminton
- Event: Doubles
Medal record
Men's badminton
Representing Sweden
World Championships
Bronze medal – third place	1977 Malmö	Men's doubles
European Championships
Silver medal – second place	1978 Preston	Men's doubles
Silver medal – second place	1980 Groningen	Men's doubles
Bronze medal – third place	1976 Dublin	Men's doubles
Bronze medal – third place	1976 Dublin	Mixed team
Bronze medal – third place	1978 Preston	Mixed team
Bronze medal – third place	1980 Groningen	Mixed team
European Junior Championships
Bronze medal – third place	1969 Leidschendam-Voorburg	Mixed doubles

Bengt Fröman is a retired male badminton player of Sweden noted for his doubles play. He won the prestigious All-England men's doubles title in 1976 and the bronze medal at the 1977 World Championships in men's doubles both in partnership with Thomas Kihlström.

== Achievements ==
=== World Championships ===
Men's doubles
Year	Venue	Partner	Opponent	Score	Result
1977	Malmö Isstadion, Malmö, Sweden	(Sweden) Thomas Kihlström	(Indonesia) Tjun Tjun (Indonesia) Johan Wahjudi	7–15, 11–15	Bronze

=== European Championships ===
Men's doubles
Year	Venue	Partner	Opponent	Score	Result
1976	Dublin, Ireland	(Sweden) Thomas Kihlström	(England) Eddy Sutton (England) Derek Talbot	13–15, 9–15	Bronze
1978	Preston, England	(Sweden) Thomas Kihlström	(England) Ray Stevens (England) Mike Tredgett	6–15, 5–15	Silver
1980	Groningen, Netherlands	(Sweden) Thomas Kihlström	(Sweden) Claes Nordin (Sweden) Stefan Karlsson	16–18, 15–9, 13–15	Silver

=== International tournaments ===
Men's doubles
Year	Tournament	Partner	Opponent	Score	Result
1972	Norwegian International	(Sweden) Thomas Kihlström	(Denmark) Klaus Kaagaard (Denmark) Per Walsøe	14–18, 13–18	(silver) Runner-up
1973	USSR International	(Sweden) Thomas Kihlström	(Germany) Roland Maywald (Germany) Wolfgang Bochow	15–13, 15–10	(gold) Winner
1973	Norwegian International	(Sweden) Thomas Kihlström	(Scotland) Fraser Gow (Scotland) Robert McCoig	7–15, 18–15, 15–18	(gold) Winner
1975	German Open	(Sweden) Thomas Kihlström	(England) Eddy Sutton (England) David Eddy	15–13, 15–5	(gold) Winner
1975	Norwegian International	(Sweden) Thomas Kihlström	(Denmark) Flemming Delfs (Denmark) Elo Hansen	15–5, 5–15, 17–18	(silver) Runner-up
1975	Nordic Championships	(Sweden) Thomas Kihlström	(Denmark) Flemming Delfs (Denmark) Elo Hansen	15–9, 15–2	(gold) Winner
1976	German Open	(Sweden) Thomas Kihlström	(England) Ray Stevens (England) Mike Tredgett	17–15, 17–15	(gold) Winner
1976	All England Open	(Sweden) Thomas Kihlström	(Denmark) Svend Pri (Denmark) Steen Skovgaard	15–12, 17–15	(gold) Winner
1976	Norwegian International	(Sweden) Thomas Kihlström	(Denmark) Flemming Delfs (Denmark) Elo Hansen	15–6, 15–12	(gold) Winner
1976	Nordic Championships	(Sweden) Thomas Kihlström	(Denmark) Svend Pri (Denmark) Steen Skovgaard	15–10, 15–1	(gold) Winner
1976	U.S. Open	(Sweden) Thomas Kihlström	(Germany) Willi Braun (Germany) Roland Maywald	15–18, 12–15	(silver) Runner-up
1977	German Open	(Sweden) Thomas Kihlström	(Denmark) Gert Hansen (Denmark) Steen Skovgaard	15–12, 15–9	(gold) Winner
1977	Denmark Open	(Sweden) Thomas Kihlström	(Denmark) Flemming Delfs (Denmark) Steen Skovgaard	15–6, 15–8	(gold) Winner
1977	Nordic Championships	(Sweden) Thomas Kihlström	(Denmark) Flemming Delfs (Denmark) Steen Skovgaard	4–15, 15–12, 15–12	(gold) Winner
1977	Canada Open	(Sweden) Thomas Kihlström	(England) Derek Talbot (England) Eddy Sutton	16–17, 15–11, 15–10	(gold) Winner
1978	Swedish Open	(Sweden) Thomas Kihlström	(Denmark) Flemming Delfs (Denmark) Steen Skovgaard	18–15, 9–15, 8–15	(silver) Runner-up
1978	Nordic Championships	(Sweden) Thomas Kihlström	(Denmark) Flemming Delfs (Denmark) Steen Skovgaard	5–15, 9–15	(silver) Runner-up
1978	Canada Open	(Sweden) Thomas Kihlström	(Denmark) Flemming Delfs (Denmark) Steen Skovgaard	9–15, 15–10; retired	(gold) Winner
1979	English Masters	(Sweden) Thomas Kihlström	(England) Ray Stevens (England) Mike Tredgett	18–16, 15–9	(gold) Winner
1979	Nordic Championships	(Sweden) Thomas Kihlström	(Denmark) Flemming Delfs (Denmark) Steen Skovgaard	13–15, 15–11, 17–14	(gold) Winner
1980	Swedish Open	(Sweden) Thomas Kihlström	(Indonesia) Ade Chandra (Indonesia) Christian Hadinata	5–15, 15–12, 9–15	(silver) Runner-up
