= Derek Talbot =

English badminton player (born 1947)

Derek Talbot MBE
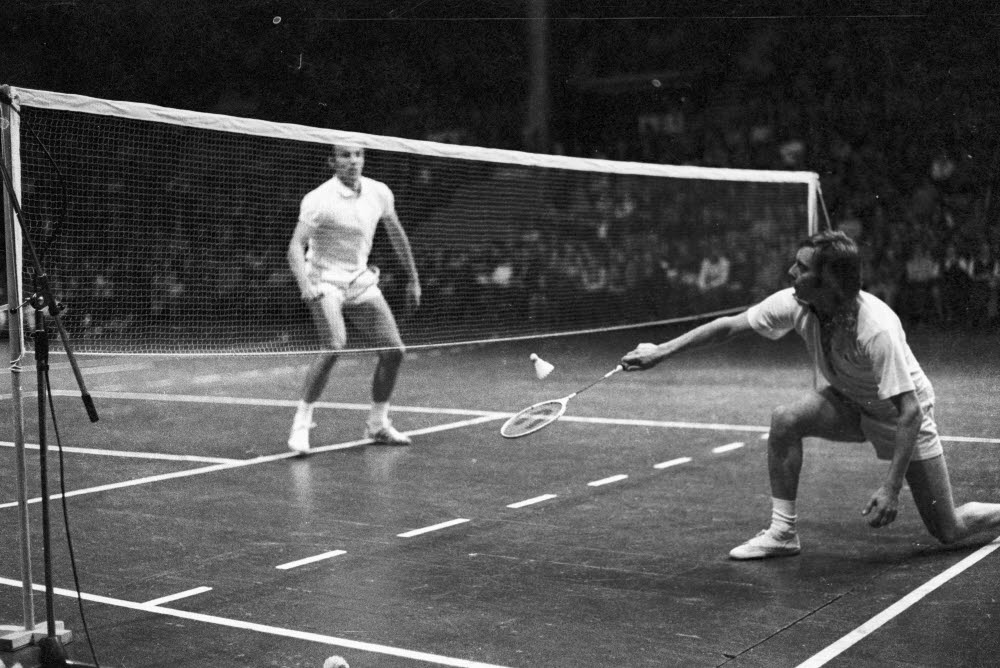
- Wolfgang Bochow (left) plays against Derek Talbot from England (right).

Personal information
- Nationality: British (English)
- Born: 23 March 1947 (age 79) Newcastle, Tyne and Wear county, England

Sport
- Sport: Badminton
Medal record
Men's badminton
Representing England
World Championships
Silver medal – second place	1977 Malmö	Mixed doubles
World Cup
Bronze medal – third place	1979 Tokyo	Men's doubles
Commonwealth Games
Gold medal – first place	1970 Edinburgh	Mixed doubles
Gold medal – first place	1974 Christchurch	Men's doubles
Gold medal – first place	1974 Christchurch	Mixed doubles
Gold medal – first place	1978 Edmonton	Mixed team
Silver medal – second place	1978 Edmonton	Men's singles
Bronze medal – third place	1974 Christchurch	Men's singles
Bronze medal – third place	1978 Edmonton	Mixed doubles
European Championships
Gold medal – first place	1972 Karlskrona	Mixed doubles
Gold medal – first place	1974 Vienna	Mixed doubles
Gold medal – first place	1976 Dublin	Mixed doubles
Silver medal – second place	1972 Karlskrona	Men's doubles
Silver medal – second place	1976 Dublin	Men's doubles
Silver medal – second place	1970 Port Talbot	Mixed doubles
Bronze medal – third place	1974 Vienna	Men's singles
Bronze medal – third place	1980 Groningen	Mixed doubles
European Mixed Team Championships
Gold medal – first place	1972 Karlskrona	Mixed team
Gold medal – first place	1974 Vienna	Mixed team
Silver medal – second place	1976 Dublin	Mixed team
Silver medal – second place	1980 Groningen	Mixed team

Derek Talbot MBE (born 23 March 1947) is a former badminton player from England. One of Britain's most successful "all-rounders," he won eleven English National Championships four singles, three doubles, and four mixed doubles. He also won four Commonwealth Games gold medals and in partnership with the formidable Gillian Gilks he won three mixed doubles crowns at the prestigious All-England Open (1973, 1976, and 1977).

== Early and personal life ==
Talbot was born and raise in Newcastle, Tyne and Wear county. He married June Kay on 18 July 1975 in Newcastle upon Tyne.

== Career ==
=== World Championships ===
Talbot won a silver medal in the 1977 IBF World Championships in the mixed doubles with Gillian Gilks, losing against Steen Skovgaard and Lene Køppen in the final.

=== 1972 Summer Olympics ===
Talbot competed in badminton at the 1972 Summer Olympics, where badminton was played as a demonstration sport. In the men's doubles he and Elliot Stuart, his former schoolfellow in Newcastle upon Tyne, were defeated in the semi-finals by Ade Chandra and Christian Hadinata 15–8, 15–12. In the mixed doubles, he paired with Gillian Gilks and they won the gold medal, beating Svend Pri and Ulla Strand of Denmark in the final 15–6, 18–16.

=== Commonwealth Games ===
Talbot represented the England team at the 1970 British Commonwealth Games in Edinburgh, Scotland, where he competed in the badminton events, winning a gold medal in the mixed doubles.

Talbot was also successful at three mor Commonwealth Games; winning three more gold medals, a silver medal and two bronze medals between 1974 and 1978.

=== Retirement ===
Talbot decided to retire from the international badminton in 1981.

== Achievements ==
=== Olympic Games (demonstration) ===
Mixed doubles
Year	Venue	Partner	Opponent	Score	Result
1972	Volleyballhalle, Munich, West Germany	(United Kingdom) Gillian Gilks	(Denmark) Svend Pri (Denmark) Ulla Strand	15–6, 18–16	Gold

=== World Championships ===
Mixed doubles
Year	Venue	Partner	Opponent	Score	Result
1977	Malmö Isstadion, Malmö, Sweden	(England) Gillian Gilks	(Denmark) Steen Skovgaard (Denmark) Lene Køppen	12–15, 17–18	Silver

=== World Cup ===
Men's doubles
Year	Venue	Partner	Opponent	Score	Result
1979	Tokyo, Japan	(England) David Eddy	(Indonesia) Ade Chandra (Indonesia) Christian Hadinata	5–15, 8–15	Bronze

=== Commonwealth Games ===
Men's singles
Year	Venue	Opponent	Score	Result
1974	Cowles Stadium, Christchurch, New Zealand	(England) Paul Whetnall	Walkover	Bronze
1978	Clare Drake Arena, Edmonton, Alberta, Canada	(India) Prakash Padukone	9–15, 8–15	Silver

Men's doubles
Year	Venue	Partner	Opponent	Score	Result
1974	Cowles Stadium, Christchurch, New Zealand	(England) Elliot Stuart	(England) Ray Stevens (England) Mike Tredgett	15–6, 6–15, 15–11	Gold

Mixed doubles
Year	Venue	Partner	Opponent	Score	Result
1970	Meadowbank Stadium, Edinburgh, Scotland	(England) Margaret Boxall	(England) Roger Mills (England) Gillian Gilks	8–15, 15–12, 15–12	Gold
1974	Cowles Stadium, Christchurch, New Zealand	(England) Gillian Gilks	(England) Paul Whetnall (England) Nora Gardner	Walkover	Gold
1978	Clare Drake Arena, Edmonton, Alberta, Canada	(England) Barbara Sutton	(New Zealand) Richard Purser (New Zealand) Alison Branfield	15–9, 15–9	Bronze

=== European Championships ===
Men's singles
Year	Venue	Opponent	Score	Result
1974	Stadthalle, Vienna, Austria	(Sweden) Thomas Kihlström	5–15, 16–17	Bronze

Men's doubles
Year	Venue	Partner	Opponent	Score	Result
1972	Karlskrona Idrottshall, Karlskrona, Sweden	(England) Elliot Stuart	(West Germany) Willi Braun (West Germany) Roland Maywald	11–15, 15–18	Silver
1976	Fitzwilliam Club, Dublin, Ireland	(England) Eddy Sutton	(England) Ray Stevens (England) Mike Tredgett	15–13, 12–15, 6–15	Silver

Mixed doubles
Year	Venue	Partner	Opponent	Score	Result
1970	Afan Lido, Port Talbot, Wales	(England) Gillian Gilks	(England) David Eddy (England) Susan Whetnall	16–17, 16–17	Silver
1972	Karlskrona Idrottshall, Karlskrona, Sweden	(England) Gillian Gilks	(West Germany) Wolfgang Bochow (West Germany) Marieluise Wackerow	15–6, 15–4	Gold
1974	Stadthalle, Vienna, Austria	(England) Gillian Gilks	(England) Elliot Stuart (England) Susan Whetnall	5–15, 15–3, 15–3	Gold
1976	Fitzwilliam Club, Dublin, Ireland	(England) Gillian Gilks	(Denmark) Steen Skovgaard (Denmark) Lene Køppen	6–15, 15–12, 17–15	Gold
1980	Martinihal, Groningen, Netherlands	(England) Karen Chapman	(Sweden) Lars Wengberg (Sweden) Anette Börjesson	15–9, 9–15, 12–15	Bronze

=== International tournaments (32 titles, 24 runners-up) ===
Men's singles
Year	Tournament	Opponent	Score	Result
1970	Scottish Open	(England) Paul Whetnall	15–13, 9–15, 10–15	(silver) Runner-up
1971	Irish International	(England) Ray Stevens	15–4, 17–16	(gold) Winner
1971	Scottish Open	(Scotland) Robert McCoig	15–5, 15–12	(gold) Winner
1972	Canadian Open	(Sweden) Sture Johnsson	15–7, 15–6	(gold) Winner
1972	U.S. Open	(Sweden) Sture Johnsson	3–15, 15–13, 8–15	(silver) Runner-up
1972	Scottish Open	(England) Ray Stevens	1–15, 15–3, 10–15	(silver) Runner-up
1973	U.S. Open	(Sweden) Sture Johnsson	4–15, 4–15	(silver) Runner-up
1976	Mexico International	(England) Ray Stevens	15–5, 15–7	(gold) Winner
1977	German Open	(Sweden) Sture Johnsson	15–12, 15–18, 7–15	(silver) Runner-up
1977	Dutch Open	(Sweden) Sture Johnsson	8–15, 15–6, 18–13	(gold) Winner
1978	Scottish Open	(Netherlands) Rob Ridder	18–14, 12–15, 15–6	(gold) Winner
1981	Portugal International	(England) Kevin Jolly	6–15, 4–15	(silver) Runner-up

Men's doubles
Year	Tournament	Partner	Opponent	Score	Result
1969	South African Championships	(England) Tony Jordan	(South Africa) Kenneth Parsons (South Africa) Rennie du Toit	15–7, 8–15, 10–15	(silver) Runner-up
1970	Scottish Open	(England) David Eddy	(England) David Horton (England) Elliot Stuart	18–13, 5–15, 9–15	(silver) Runner-up
1971	Irish International	(England) Elliot Stuart	(England) Roger Mills (England) Ray Stevens	15–10, 15–3	(gold) Winner
1971	Dutch Open	(England) Elliot Stuart	(Denmark) Erland Kops (Denmark) Svend Pri	11–15, 5–15	(silver) Runner-up
1972	U.S. Open	(England) Elliot Stuart	(United States) Mike Adams (United States) Thomas Carmichael	15–9, 5–15, 15–3	(gold) Winner
1972	Canadian Open	(England) Elliot Stuart	(England) Ray Stevens (England) Mike Tredgett	11–15, 13–15	(silver) Runner-up
1972	German Open	(England) Elliot Stuart	(Malaysia) Ng Boon Bee (Malaysia) Punch Gunalan	9–15, 12–15	(silver) Runner-up
1972	Dutch Open	(England) Elliot Stuart	(Denmark) Erland Kops (Denmark) Svend Pri	6–15, 15–11, 7–15	(silver) Runner-up
1973	India Open	(England) Elliot Stuart	(Indonesia) Indra Gunawan (Indonesia) Amril Nurman	15–11, 15–8	(gold) Winner
1973	U.S. Open	(England) Mike Tredgett	(United States) Jim Poole (United States) Don Paup	15–11, 11–15, 12–15	(silver) Runner-up
1973	Jamaica International	(England) Mike Tredgett	(Canada) Jamie Paulson (Canada) Yves Paré	11–15, 1–15	(silver) Runner-up
1973	Dutch Open	(England) Elliot Stuart	(England) David Eddy (England) Eddy Sutton	12–15, 15–18	(silver) Runner-up
1973	Swedish Open	(England) Elliot Stuart	(Denmark) Poul Petersen (Denmark) Svend Pri	9–15, 15–1, 10–15	(silver) Runner-up
1974	German Open	(England) Elliot Stuart	(England) Ray Stevens (England) Mike Tredgett	15–12, 14–15, 15–5	(gold) Winner
1974	Dutch Open	(England) Elliot Stuart	(England) Ray Stevens (England) Mike Tredgett	15–8, 12–15, 4–15	(silver) Runner-up
1975	Scottish Open	(England) Elliot Stuart	(Scotland) Jim Ansari (Scotland) John Britton	12–15, 15–7, 15–8	(gold) Winner
1977	Canadian Open	(England) Eddy Sutton	(Sweden) Bengt Fröman (Sweden) Thomas Kihlström	17–16, 11–15, 10–15	(silver) Runner-up
1978	Scottish Open	(England) Mike Tredgett	(Scotland) Billy Gilliland (Scotland) Fraser Gow	15–6, 15–7	(gold) Winner
1979	Dutch Open	(England) Elliot Stuart	(Denmark) Morten Frost (Denmark) Steen Fladberg	15–8, 18–17	(gold) Winner
1980	Scottish Open	(England) Kevin Jolly	(England) Ray Stevens (England) Mike Tredgett	4–15, 11–15	(silver) Runner-up
1981	Portugal International	(England) Ray Stevens	(Scotland) Billy Gilliland (England) Kevin Jolly	18–17, 12–15, 15–12	(gold) Winner

Mixed doubles
Year	Tournament	Partner	Opponent	Score	Result
1969	Dutch Open	(England) Gillian Gilks	(West Germany) Wolfgang Bochow (West Germany) Karin Dittberner	15–7, 1–15, 15–5	(gold) Winner
1969	South African Championships	(England) Gillian Gilks	(England) Tony Jordan (England) Susan Whetnall	15–10, 15–13	(gold) Winner
1970	Dutch Open	(England) Gillian Gilks	(England) David Eddy (England) Margaret Boxall	18–14, 15–8	(gold) Winner
1971	Irish International	(England) Gillian Gilks	(England) Roger Mills (England) Julie Rickard	15–4, 15–9	(gold) Winner
1971	Swedish Open	(England) Gillian Gilks	(Denmark) Per Walsøe (Denmark) Pernille Kaagaard	5–15, 15–6, 17–14	(gold) Winner
1971	All England Open	(England) Gillian Gilks	(Denmark) Svend Pri (Denmark) Ulla Strand	12–15, 15–8, 11–15	(silver) Runner-up
1971	German Open	(England) Gillian Gilks	(West Germany) Wolfgang Bochow (Australia) Kay Nesbit	15–8, 15–10	(gold) Winner
1971	Dutch Open	(England) Gillian Gilks	(Denmark) Svend Pri (Denmark) Ulla Strand	15–4, 6–15, 17–16	(gold) Winner
1972	Scottish Open	(England) Gillian Gilks	(Scotland) Robert McCoig (England) Margaret Beck	15–9, 15–11	(gold) Winner
1972	All England Open	(England) Gillian Gilks	(Denmark) Svend Pri (Denmark) Ulla Strand	15–12, 8–15, 12–15	(silver) Runner-up
1973	Denmark Open	(England) Nora Perry	(Denmark) Elo Hansen (Denmark) Ulla Strand	15–4, 14–17, 10–15	(silver) Runner-up
1973	Dutch Open	(England) Gillian Gilks	(England) David Eddy (England) Nora Perry	13–15, 15–6, 15–5	(gold) Winner
1973	Swedish Open	(England) Gillian Gilks	(England) Elliot Stuart (England) Margaret Beck	15–11, 15–3	(gold) Winner
1973	All England Open	(England) Gillian Gilks	(England) Elliot Stuart (England) Nora Perry	9–15, 15–13, 15–8	(gold) Winner
1974	All England Open	(England) Gillian Gilks	(England) David Eddy (England) Susan Whetnall	5–15, 15–7, 10–15	(silver) Runner-up
1976	All England Open	(England) Gillian Gilks	(England) Mike Tredgett (England) Nora Perry	15–9, 15–12	(gold) Winner
1976	Dutch Open	(England) Gillian Gilks	(Denmark) Steen Skovgaard (Denmark) Lene Køppen	15–6, 13–15, 15–3	(gold) Winner
1976	Scottish Open	(England) Gillian Gilks	(England) Mike Tredgett (England) Nora Perry	18–17, 15–9	(gold) Winner
1976	Mexico International	(Netherlands) Joke van Beusekom	(England) Mike Tredgett (England) Nora Perry	5–15, 6–15	(silver) Runner-up
1977	All England Open	(England) Gillian Gilks	(England) Mike Tredgett (England) Nora Perry	15–9, 15–9	(gold) Winner
1977	Dutch Open	(England) Gillian Gilks	(Denmark) Steen Skovgaard (Netherlands) Joke van Beusekom	15–7, 15–10	(gold) Winner
1977	Swedish Open	(England) Gillian Gilks	(Denmark) Steen Skovgaard (Denmark) Lene Køppen	15–6, 15–9	(gold) Winner
1979	Dutch Open	(England) Gillian Gilks	(England) David Eddy (England) Barbara Sutton	15–8, 15–11	(gold) Winner

== Post-Badminton ==
Towards the latter stages of his badminton career Derek ran a sports shop, which specialised in racket sports, with ex-South African badminton internationalist Eddie Allen, and local man Neil Woodward, in Newcastle. They sold their own Vicourt badminton rackets. When he retired from serious competition, he set up his own badminton company called Talbot Torro Badminton. In recent years Derek left his more traditional career behind and ultimately set up the Natural Patient homeopathic centre in Ibiza.

He was appointed Member of the Order of the British Empire (MBE) in the 2013 Birthday Honours for services to badminton.
