= Mike Tredgett =

English badminton player (born 1949)

Mike Tredgett MBE
Personal information
- Born: 5 April 1949 (age 77) Cheltenham, Gloucestershire, England

Sport
- Country: England
- Sport: Badminton
Medal record
Men's badminton
Representing Great Britain
World Games
Silver medal – second place	1981 Santa Clara	Mixed doubles
Representing England
World Championships
Silver medal – second place	1983 Copenhagen	Men's doubles
Silver medal – second place	1980 Jakarta	Mixed doubles
Bronze medal – third place	1977 Malmö	Men's doubles
Bronze medal – third place	1977 Malmö	Mixed doubles
Bronze medal – third place	1983 Copenhagen	Mixed doubles
Thomas Cup
Bronze medal – third place	1982 London	Men's team
Bronze medal – third place	1984 Kuala Lumpur	Men's team
Commonwealth Games
Gold medal – first place	1978 Edmonton	Men's doubles
Gold medal – first place	1978 Edmonton	Mixed doubles
Gold medal – first place	1978 Edmonton	Mixed team
Silver medal – second place	1974 Christchurch	Men's doubles
European Championships
Gold medal – first place	1976 Dublin	Men's doubles
Gold medal – first place	1978 Preston	Men's doubles
Gold medal – first place	1984 Preston	Men's doubles
Gold medal – first place	1978 Preston	Mixed doubles
Gold medal – first place	1980 Groningen	Mixed doubles
Silver medal – second place	1982 Böblingen	Men's doubles
Silver medal – second place	1982 Böblingen	Mixed doubles
Bronze medal – third place	1974 Vienna	Men's doubles
Bronze medal – third place	1980 Groningen	Men's doubles
Bronze medal – third place	1974 Vienna	Mixed doubles
Bronze medal – third place	1976 Dublin	Mixed doubles
Bronze medal – third place	1984 Preston	Mixed doubles
European Mixed Team Championships
Gold medal – first place	1974 Vienna	Mixed team
Gold medal – first place	1978 Preston	Mixed team
Gold medal – first place	1982 Böblingen	Mixed team
Gold medal – first place	1984 Preston	Mixed team
Silver medal – second place	1976 Dublin	Mixed team
Silver medal – second place	1980 Groningen	Mixed team

Michael Graham Tredgett MBE (born 5 April 1949) is an English badminton player who specialized in doubles and played at the world level for more than a decade, winning numerous international men's doubles and mixed doubles titles. Partnered with Nora Perry, they became the first ever world number one mixed doubles pairing in the inaugural IBF world ranking release in 1978.

== Badminton career ==
Tredgett won five medals in the World Championships between 1977 and 1983. He is also one of the most successful players ever in the European Badminton Championships with 5 titles, three of them in men's doubles and two in mixed doubles. He shared three All-England mixed doubles titles (1978, 1980, 1981) with Nora Perry and reached the All-England men's doubles final twice with Ray Stevens (1972, 1980) and twice with Martin Dew (1983, 1984). He won men's doubles with Stevens at the 1978 Commonwealth Games.

== Personal life and post-career ==
In 1978 he married fellow badminton player Kathryn Whiting (a former English Junior champion). In 1984, Tredgett was inaugurated with Most Excellent Order of The British Empire (MBE) medal due to his excellent service in sports. In 2019, Tredgett was being inducted into Badminton Europe (BEC) Hall of fame.

== Achievements ==
=== World Championships ===
Men's doubles
Year	Venue	Partner	Opponent	Score	Result
1977	Malmö Isstadion, Malmö, Sweden	(England) Ray Stevens	(Indonesia) Ade Chandra (Indonesia) Christian Hadinata	8–15, 10–15	Bronze
1983	Brøndbyhallen, Copenhagen, Denmark	(England) Martin Dew	(Denmark) Steen Fladberg (Denmark) Jesper Helledie	10–15, 10–15	Silver

Mixed doubles
Year	Venue	Partner	Opponent	Score	Result
1977	Malmö Isstadion, Malmö, Sweden	(England) Nora Perry	(Denmark) Steen Skovgaard (Denmark) Lene Køppen	15–17, 10–15	Bronze
1980	Istora Senayan, Jakarta, Indonesia	(England) Nora Perry	(Indonesia) Christian Hadinata (Indonesia) Imelda Wiguna	12–15, 4–15	Silver
1983	Brøndbyhallen, Copenhagen, Denmark	(England) Karen Chapman	(Sweden) Thomas Kihlström (England) Nora Perry	10–15, 15–9, 6–15	Bronze

=== World Games ===
Mixed doubles
Year	Venue	Partner	Opponent	Score	Result
1981	San Jose Civic Auditorium, California, United States	(United Kingdom) Nora Perry	(Sweden) Thomas Kihlstrom (United Kingdom) Gillian Gilks	6–15, 14–18	Silver

=== Commonwealth Games ===
Men's doubles
Year	Venue	Partner	Opponent	Score	Result
1974	Cowles Stadium, Christchurch, New Zealand	(England) Ray Stevens	(England) Elliot Stuart (England) Derek Talbot	6–15, 15–6, 11–15	Silver
1978	University of Alberta Arena, Edmonton, Alberta, Canada	(England) Ray Stevens	(Malaysia) Moo Foot Lian (Malaysia) Ong Teong Boon	15–10, 15–5	Gold

Mixed doubles
Year	Venue	Partner	Opponent	Score	Result
1978	University of Alberta Arena, Edmonton, Alberta, Canada	(England) Nora Perry	(Scotland) Billy Gilliland (Scotland) Joanna Flockhart	15–7, 15–7	Gold

=== European Championships ===
Men's doubles
Year	Venue	Partner	Opponent	Score	Result
1974	Stadthalle, Vienna, Austria	(England) Ray Stevens	(Denmark) Poul Petersen (Denmark) Svend Pri	8–15, 8–15	Bronze
1976	Fitzwilliam Club, Dublin, Ireland	(England) Ray Stevens	(England) Eddy Sutton (England) Derek Talbot	13–15, 15–12, 15–6	Gold
1978	Guild Hall, Preston, England	(England) Ray Stevens	(Sweden) Bengt Fröman (Sweden) Thomas Kihlström	15–6, 15–5	Gold
1980	Martinihal, Groningen, Netherlands	(England) Ray Stevens	(Sweden) Bengt Fröman (Sweden) Thomas Kihlström	11–15, 10–15	Bronze
1982	Sporthalle, Böblingen, West Germany	(England) Martin Dew	(Sweden) Stefan Karlsson (Sweden) Thomas Kihlström	9–15, 3–15	Silver
1984	Guild Hall, Preston, England	(England) Martin Dew	(Denmark) Morten Frost (Denmark) Jens Peter Nierhoff	15–8, 15–10	Gold

Mixed doubles
Year	Venue	Partner	Opponent	Score	Result
1974	Stadthalle, Vienna, Austria	(England) Barbara Giles	(England) Derek Talbot (England) Gillian Gilks	0–15, 11–15	Bronze
1976	Fitzwilliam Club, Dublin, Ireland	(England) Nora Perry	(Denmark) Steen Skovgaard (Denmark) Lene Køppen	15–9, 7–15, 4–15	Bronze
1978	Guild Hall, Preston, England	(England) Nora Perry	(Denmark) Steen Skovgaard (Denmark) Lene Køppen	15–9, 15–10	Gold
1980	Martinihal, Groningen, Netherlands	(England) Nora Perry	(Sweden) Lars Wengberg (Sweden) Anette Börjesson	15–0, 15–6	Gold
1982	Sporthalle, Böblingen, West Germany	(England) Nora Perry	(England) Martin Dew (England) Gillian Gilks	12–15, 5–15	Silver
1984	Guild Hall, Preston, England	(England) Karen Chapman	(Sweden) Thomas Kihlström (Sweden) Maria Bengtsson	8–15, 12–15	Bronze

=== IBF World Grand Prix (2 titles, 8 runners-up) ===
The World Badminton Grand Prix sanctioned by International Badminton Federation (IBF) from 1983 to 2006.

Men's doubles
Year	Tournament	Partner	Opponent	Score	Result
1983	Dutch Open	(England) Martin Dew	(Denmark) Steen Fladberg (Denmark) Jesper Helledie	13–18, 10–15	(silver) Runner-up
1983	German Open	(England) Martin Dew	(Malaysia) Jalani Sidek (Malaysia) Razif Sidek	8–15, 15–12, 15–8	(gold) Winner
1983	All England Open	(England) Martin Dew	(Sweden) Stefan Karlsson (Sweden) Thomas Kihlström	10–15, 13–15	(silver) Runner-up
1983	Scandinavian Cup	(England) Martin Dew	(Indonesia) Rudy Heryanto (Indonesia) Kartono	15–12, 16–18, 11–15	(silver) Runner-up
1984	German Open	(England) Martin Dew	(England) Duncan Bridge (England) Nigel Tier	15–9, 7–15, 18–17	(gold) Winner
1984	All England Open	(England) Martin Dew	(Indonesia) Rudy Heryanto (Indonesia) Kartono	11–15, 6–15	(silver) Runner-up

Mixed doubles
Year	Tournament	Partner	Opponent	Score	Result
1983	English Masters	(England) Karen Chapman	(England) Martin Dew (England) Gillian Gilks	5–15, 8–15	(silver) Runner-up
1983	Holland Masters	(England) Karen Beckman	(England) Martin Dew (England) Gillian Gilks	4–15, 10–15	(silver) Runner-up
1983	Scandinavian Cup	(England) Karen Chapman	(England) Martin Dew (England) Gillian Gilks	13–15, 12–15	(silver) Runner-up
1984	German Open	(England) Karen Chapman	(England) Martin Dew (England) Gillian Gilks	5–15, 15–12, 11–15	(silver) Runner-up

=== IBF International (3 titles) ===
Men's doubles
Year	Tournament	Partner	Opponent	Score	Result
1983	Welsh International	(England) Martin Dew	(England) Duncan Bridge (England) Nigel Tier	18–14, 15–9	(gold) Winner

Mixed doubles
Year	Tournament	Partner	Opponent	Score	Result
1983	Welsh International	(England) Karen Chapman	(England) Martin Dew (England) Gillian Gilks	8–15, 15–9, 18–15	(gold) Winner
1987	Irish Open	(England) Karen Beckman	(Scotland) Billy Gilliland (Scotland) Jennifer Allen	15–7, 8–15, 15–11	(gold) Winner

=== International tournaments (38 titles, 22 runners-up) ===
Men's singles
Year	Tournament	Opponent	Score	Result
1971	Welsh International	(England) Philip Stevens	18–16, 15–8	(gold) Winner
1976	South African Championships	(England) Ray Stevens	9–15, 5–15	(silver) Runner-up
1977	Welsh International	(England) David Eddy	15–9, 15–4	(gold) Winner

Men's doubles
Year	Tournament	Partner	Opponent	Score	Result
1972	Canadian Open	(England) Ray Stevens	(England) Elliot Stuart (England) Derek Talbot	15–11, 15–13	(gold) Winner
1972	All England Open	(England) Ray Stevens	(Indonesia) Ade Chandra (Indonesia) Christian Hadinata	5–15, 12–15	(silver) Runner-up
1973	U.S. Open	(England) Derek Talbot	(United States) James Richard Poole (United States) Donald C. Paup	15–11, 11–15, 12–15	(silver) Runner-up
1973	Jamaica International	(England) Derek Talbot	(Canada) Jamie Paulson (Canada) Yves Paré	11–15, 1–15	(silver) Runner-up
1974	Dutch Open	(England) Ray Stevens	(England) Elliot Stuart (England) Derek Talbot	8–15, 15–12, 15–4	(gold) Winner
1974	Scottish Open	(England) Ray Stevens	(Denmark) Tom Bacher (Malaysia) Punch Gunalan	9–15, 8–15	(silver) Runner-up
1974	German Open	(England) Ray Stevens	(England) Elliot Stuart (England) Derek Talbot	12–15, 15–14, 5–15	(silver) Runner-up
1975	Swedish Open	(England) Ray Stevens	(Denmark) Jesper Helledie (Denmark) Jørgen Mortensen	15–6, 13–15, 15–6	(gold) Winner
1975	Dutch Open	(England) Ray Stevens	(England) David Eddy (England) Eddy Sutton	15–12, 15–9	(gold) Winner
1975	Canadian Open	(England) Ray Stevens	(Japan) Nobutaka Ikeda (Japan) Shoichi Toganoo	17–16, 12–15, 15–12	(gold) Winner
1975	Jamaica International	(England) Ray Stevens	(Denmark) Flemming Delfs (Denmark) Elo Hansen	13–15, 15–4, 15–11	(gold) Winner
1976	Canadian Open	(England) Ray Stevens	(Thailand) Bandid Jaiyen (Thailand) Surapong Suharitdamrong	12–15, 15–10, 15–6	(gold) Winner
1976	Scottish Open	(England) Ray Stevens	(Scotland) Jim Ansari (Scotland) John Britton	15–7, 15–11	(gold) Winner
1976	South African Championships	(England) Ray Stevens	(England) David Eddy (Netherlands) Rob Ridder	15–13, 15–9	(gold) Winner
1977	Welsh International	(England) Elliot Stuart	(England) David Eddy (England) Eddy Sutton	13–9 retired	(silver) Runner-up
1978	German Open	(England) Ray Stevens	(Sweden) Ola Eriksson (Sweden) Christian Lundberg	6–15, 6–15	(silver) Runner-up
1978	Scottish Open	(England) Derek Talbot	(Scotland) Billy Gilliland (Scotland) Fraser Gow	15–6, 15–7	(gold) Winner
1978	Dutch Open	(England) Ray Stevens	(Denmark) Jesper Helledie (Denmark) Svend Pri	15–9, 1–15, 5–15	(silver) Runner-up
1979	English Masters	(England) Ray Stevens	(Sweden) Bengt Fröman (Sweden) Thomas Kihlström	16–18, 9–15	(silver) Runner-up
1980	Welsh International	(England) Ray Stevens	(Scotland) Billy Gilliland (Scotland) Dan Travers	7–15, 15–11, 15–6	(gold) Winner
1980	Scottish Open	(England) Ray Stevens	(England) Kevin Jolly (England) Derek Talbot	15–4, 15–11	(gold) Winner
1980	All England Open	(England) Ray Stevens	(Indonesia) Tjun Tjun (Indonesia) Johan Wahjudi	15–10, 9–15, 10–15	(silver) Runner-up
1980	Canadian Open	(England) Ray Stevens	(Sweden) Claes Nordin (Sweden) Stefan Karlsson	15–9, 8–8 ret.	(gold) Winner
1981	English Masters	(England) Martin Dew	(Sweden) Stefan Karlsson (Sweden) Thomas Kihlström	15–9, 2–15, 15–10	(gold) Winner
1981	Dutch Open	(England) Andy Goode	(Scotland) Billy Gilliland (Scotland) Dan Travers	5–15, 8–15	(silver) Runner-up
1982	Chinese Taipei Open	(England) Martin Dew	(Indonesia) Bobby Ertanto (Indonesia) Hadibowo	15–6, 11–15, 15–11	(gold) Winner
1982	Japan Open	(England) Martin Dew	(Indonesia) Rudy Heryanto (Indonesia) Kartono	15–9, 7–15, 14–18	(silver) Runner-up
1982	Dutch Open	(England) Martin Dew	(Scotland) Billy Gilliland (Scotland) Dan Travers	11–15, 15–5, 17–15	(gold) Winner
1982	Welsh International	(England) Dipak Tailor	(England) Andy Goode (England) Gary Scott	15–7, 7–15, 15–12	(gold) Winner

Mixed doubles
Year	Tournament	Partner	Opponent	Score	Result
1971	Welsh International	(England) Kathleen Whiting	(England) D. R. M. Fither (Wales) M. Withers	15–0, 15–1	(gold) Winner
1973	Jamaica International	(England) Margaret Beck	(Sweden) Sture Johnsson (Sweden) Eva Twedberg	3–15, 15–18	(silver) Runner-up
1974	Scottish Open	(England) Margaret Boxall	(England) Paul Whetnall (England) Nora Perry	4–15, 14–18	(silver) Runner-up
1975	Swedish Open	(England) Nora Perry	(England) Elliot Stuart (England) Susan Whetnall	15–12, 15–6	(gold) Winner
1976	German Open	(England) Nora Perry	(Denmark) Steen Skovgaard (Denmark) Lene Køppen	15–9, 15–10	(gold) Winner
1976	Scottish Open	(England) Nora Perry	(England) Derek Talbot (England) Gillian Gilks	17–18, 9–15	(silver) Runner-up
1976	South African Championships	(England) Nora Perry	(South Africa) Gordon McMillan (South Africa) Marianne van der Walt	15–1, 15–6	(gold) Winner
1977	All England Open	(England) Nora Perry	(England) Derek Talbot (England) Gillian Gilks	9–15, 9–15	(silver) Runner-up
1978	Dutch Open	(England) Nora Perry	(Scotland) Billy Gilliland (Scotland) Joanna Flockhart	15–8, 15–9	(gold) Winner
1978	Denmark Open	(England) Nora Perry	(Denmark) Steen Skovgaard (Denmark) Lene Køppen	9–15, 11–15	(silver) Runner-up
1978	All England Open	(England) Nora Perry	(Denmark) Steen Skovgaard (Denmark) Lene Køppen	15–7, 15–4	(gold) Winner
1978	Swedish Open	(England) Nora Perry	(Denmark) Steen Skovgaard (Denmark) Lene Køppen	15–2, 15–9	(gold) Winner
1978	German Open	(England) Nora Perry	(Netherlands) Rob Ridder (Netherlands) Marjan Ridder	11–15, 15–6, 10–15	(silver) Runner-up
1979	Swedish Open	(England) Nora Perry	(Denmark) Steen Skovgaard (Denmark) Lene Køppen	12–15, 18–17, 18–16	(gold) Winner
1979	All England Open	(England) Nora Perry	(Indonesia) Christian Hadinata (Indonesia) Imelda Wiguna	1–15, 17–18	(silver) Runner-up
1980	Canadian Open	(England) Nora Perry	(Denmark) Steen Fladberg (Canada) Johanne Falardeau	15–7, 15–9	(gold) Winner
1980	Denmark Open	(England) Nora Perry	(Denmark) Steen Skovgaard (Denmark) Lene Køppen	15–11, 15–8	(gold) Winner
1980	Scottish Open	(England) Karen Chapman	(Scotland) Billy Gilliland (Scotland) Joanna Flockhart	15–2, 15–2	(gold) Winner
1980	All England Open	(England) Nora Perry	(Indonesia) Christian Hadinata (Indonesia) Imelda Wiguna	18–13, 15–10	(gold) Winner
1980	Welsh International	(England) Nora Perry	(Scotland) Billy Gilliland (England) Karen Chapman	10–15, 15–11, 15–10	(gold) Winner
1981	Copenhagen Cup	(England) Nora Perry	(Netherlands) Rob Ridder (Netherlands) Marjan Ridder	15–12, 15–6	(gold) Winner
1981	Denmark Open	(England) Nora Perry	(Indonesia) Christian Hadinata (Indonesia) Imelda Wiguna	15–2, 15–2	(gold) Winner
1981	All England Open	(England) Nora Perry	(Indonesia) Christian Hadinata (Indonesia) Imelda Wiguna	10–15, 18–14, 15–10	(gold) Winner
1981	English Masters	(England) Nora Perry	(Denmark) Morten Frost (Denmark) Lene Køppen	15–5, 15–6	(gold) Winner
1981	Dutch Open	(England) Nora Perry	(Sweden) Thomas Kihlström (England) Gillian Gilks	12–15, 6–15	(silver) Runner-up
1981	Scandinavian Cup	(England) Nora Perry	(Denmark) Steen Skovgaard (England) Jane Webster	15–12, 15–8	(gold) Winner
1982	Japan Open	(England) Nora Perry	(England) Martin Dew (England) Jane Webster	15–10, 15–2	(gold) Winner
1982	Welsh International	(England) Gillian Clark	(England) Dipak Tailor (England) Nora Perry	14–18, 11–15	(silver) Runner-up
