= 1969 European Junior Badminton Championships =

Badminton championships

Tournament details
- Dates: 19–20 April 1969
- Edition: 1st
- Venue: Sporthal de Vliegermolen
- Location: Voorburg, Netherlands

The 1969 European Junior Badminton Championships was the first ever edition of the European Junior Badminton Championships. It was held in Leidschendam-Voorburg, Netherlands, in the month of April. Danish players won both the singles disciplines, England won Boys' doubles, host Netherlands won Girls' doubles while Sweden bagged mixed doubles title.

== Medalists ==
Discipline	Gold	Silver	Bronze
Boys' singles	(Denmark) Flemming Delfs	(Denmark) Preben Boesen	(Netherlands) Piet Ridder
Boys' singles	(Denmark) Flemming Delfs	(Denmark) Preben Boesen	(England) Ray Stevens
Girls' singles	(Denmark) Anne Berglund	(England) Margaret Beck	(Denmark) Annie Bøg Jørgensen
Girls' singles	(Denmark) Anne Berglund	(England) Margaret Beck	(Netherlands) Joke van Beusekom
Boys' doubles	(England) Keith Arthur (England) Ray Stevens	(Denmark) Preben Boesen (Denmark) Mogens Neergaard	(Denmark) Flemming Delfs (Denmark) Hans Røpke
Boys' doubles	(England) Keith Arthur (England) Ray Stevens	(Denmark) Preben Boesen (Denmark) Mogens Neergaard	(Netherlands) Piet Ridder (Netherlands) Rudy Hartog
Girls' doubles	(Netherlands) Joke van Beusekom (Netherlands) Marjan Luesken	(England) Margaret Beck (England) Carol Wightman	(Netherlands) Erika Fikenscher (Netherlands) Ingrid Fikenscher
Girls' doubles	(Netherlands) Joke van Beusekom (Netherlands) Marjan Luesken	(England) Margaret Beck (England) Carol Wightman	(Denmark) Bente Pedersen (Denmark) Susan Jensen
Mixed doubles	(Sweden) Gert Perneklo (Sweden) Karin Lindquist	(Denmark) Mogens Neergaard (Denmark) Bente Pedersen	(England) Ray Stevens (England) Margaret Beck
Mixed doubles	(Sweden) Gert Perneklo (Sweden) Karin Lindquist	(Denmark) Mogens Neergaard (Denmark) Bente Pedersen	(Sweden) Bengt Fröman (Sweden) Margareta Söderberg

== Results ==
=== Semi-finals ===
Category	Winner	Runner-up	Score
Boys' singles	(Denmark) Flemming Delfs	(England) Ray Stevens	15–5, 15–7
Boys' singles	(Denmark) Preben Boesen	(Netherlands) Piet Ridder	8–15, 15–8, 15–6
Girls' singles	(Denmark) Anne Berglund	(Netherlands) Joke van Beusekom	11–9, 9–11, –, –
Girls' singles	(England) Margaret Beck	(Denmark) Annie Bøg Jørgensen	11–6, 11–3
Boys' doubles	(Denmark) Mogens Neergaard (Denmark) Preben Boesen	(Netherlands) Piet Ridder (Netherlands) Rudy Hartog	15–6, 15–8
Boys' doubles	(England) Keith Arthur (England) Ray Stevens	(Denmark) Flemming Delfs (Denmark) Hans Røpke	9–15, 15–10, 15–10
Girls' doubles	(Netherlands) Joke van Beusekom (Netherlands) Marjan Luesken	(Denmark) Bente Pedersen (Denmark) Susan Jensen	15–13, 17–15
Girls' doubles	(England) Carol Whightman (England) Margaret Beck	(Netherlands) Erika Fikenscher (Netherlands) Ingrid Fikenscher	–, –
Mixed doubles	(Sweden) Gert Perneklo (Sweden) Karin Lindquist	(England) Ray Stevens (England) Margaret Beck	–, –
Mixed doubles	(Denmark) Mogens Neergaard (Denmark) Bente Pedersen	(Sweden) Bengt Fröman (Sweden) Margareta Söderberg	15–10, 8–15, 15–6

=== Finals ===
Category	Winners	Runners-up	Score
Boys' singles	(Denmark) Flemming Delfs	(Denmark) Preben Boesen	15–0, 15–1
Girls' singles	(Denmark) Anne Berglund	(England) Margaret Beck	6–11, 11–6, 12–11
Boys' doubles	(England) Keith Arthur (England) Ray Stevens	(Denmark) Mogens Neergaard (Denmark) Preben Boesen	15–9, 15–4
Girls' doubles	(Netherlands) Joke van Beusekom (Netherlands) Marjan Luesken	(England) Carol Whightman (England) Margaret Beck	15–5, 15–9
Mixed doubles	(Sweden) Gert Perneklo (Sweden) Karin Lindquist	(Denmark) Mogens Neergaard (Denmark) Bente Pedersen	15–10, 14–15, 15–6

== Medal table ==
Rank	Nation	Gold	Silver	Bronze	Total
1	Denmark (DEN)	2	3	3	8
2	England (ENG)	1	2	2	5
3	Netherlands (NED)	1	0	4	5
4	Sweden (SWE)	1	0	1	2
Totals (4 entries)		5	5	10	20
