= 1978 European Badminton Championships =

Tournament details
- Dates: 13–15 April
- Edition: 6
- Venue: Guild Hall
- Location: Preston, England

The 6th European Badminton Championships were held in Preston, England, between 13 April and 15 April 1978, and hosted by the European Badminton Union and the Badminton England.

In the individual match between Kevin Jolly and Jesper Helledie, Jolly was disqualified from the tournament due to his protest of not playing the match in a sporting manner, because he did not accept the line judge's decision.

== Medalists ==
Event	Gold	Silver	Bronze
Men's singles	(Denmark) Flemming Delfs	(Sweden) Thomas Kihlström	(Sweden) Sture Johnsson
Men's singles	(Denmark) Flemming Delfs	(Sweden) Thomas Kihlström	(England) Ray Stevens
Women's singles	(Denmark) Lene Køppen	(England) Jane Webster	(Sweden) Anette Börjesson
Women's singles	(Denmark) Lene Køppen	(England) Jane Webster	(Netherlands) Joke van Beusekom
Men's doubles	(England) Ray Stevens and Mike Tredgett	(Sweden) Bengt Fröman and Thomas Kihlström	(England) David Eddy and Eddy Sutton
Men's doubles	(England) Ray Stevens and Mike Tredgett	(Sweden) Bengt Fröman and Thomas Kihlström	(Sweden) Stefan Karlsson and Claes Nordin
Women's doubles	(England) Nora Perry and Anne Statt	(England) Jane Webster and Barbara Sutton	(Denmark) Inge Borgström and Pia Nielsen
Women's doubles	(England) Nora Perry and Anne Statt	(England) Jane Webster and Barbara Sutton	(Netherlands) Joke van Beusekom and Marjan Ridder
Mixed doubles	(England) Mike Tredgett and Nora Perry	(Denmark) Steen Skovgaard and Lene Køppen	(Scotland) Billy Gilliland and Joanna Flockhart
Mixed doubles	(England) Mike Tredgett and Nora Perry	(Denmark) Steen Skovgaard and Lene Køppen	(Netherlands) Rob Ridder and Marjan Ridder
Teams	England	Denmark	Sweden

== Semifinals ==
- Source

Discipline	Winner	Runner-up	Score
Men's singles	(Denmark) Flemming Delfs	(Sweden) Sture Johnsson	17–14, 15–9
Men's singles	(Sweden) Thomas Kihlström	(England) Ray Stevens	7–15, 15–4, 15–8
Women's singles	(Denmark) Lene Køppen	(Sweden) Anette Börjesson	11–0, 11–2
Women's singles	(England) Jane Webster	(Netherlands) Joke van Beusekom	9–12, 11–1, 11–8
Men's doubles	(Sweden) Thomas Kihlström (Sweden) Bengt Fröman	(England) David Eddy (England) Eddy Sutton	15–9, 15–5
Men's doubles	(England) Ray Stevens (England) Mike Tredgett	(Sweden) Stefan Karlsson (Sweden) Claes Nordin	15–12, 10–15, 15–4
Women's doubles	(England) Nora Perry (England) Anne Statt	(Denmark) Inge Borgstrøm (Denmark) Pia Nielsen	17–14, 15–11
Women's doubles	(England) Barbara Sutton (England) Jane Webster	(Netherlands) Joke van Beusekom (Netherlands) Marjan Ridder	13–15, 15–10, 15–7
Mixed doubles	(Denmark) Steen Skovgaard (Denmark) Lene Køppen	(Scotland) Billy Gilliland (Scotland) Joanna Flockhart	15–4, 15–4
Mixed doubles	(England) Mike Tredgett (England) Nora Perry	(Netherlands) Rob Ridder (Netherlands) Marjan Ridder	15–8, 15–5

== Final results ==
Category	Winners	Runners-up	Score
Men's singles	(Denmark) Flemming Delfs	(Sweden) Thomas Kihlström	10–15, 15–6, 15–12
Women's singles	(Denmark) Lene Køppen	(England) Jane Webster	11–4, 9–11, 11–0
Men's doubles	(England) Ray Stevens (England) Mike Tredgett	(Sweden) Bengt Fröman (Sweden) Thomas Kihlström	15–6, 15–5
Women's doubles	(England) Nora Perry (England) Anne Statt	(England) Barbara Sutton (England) Jane Webster	15–7, 15–7
Mixed doubles	(England) Mike Tredgett (England) Nora Perry	(Denmark) Steen Skovgaard (Denmark) Lene Køppen	15–9, 15–10

== Medal account ==
* Host nation (England)

Rank	Nation	Gold	Silver	Bronze	Total
1	England*	4	2	2	8
2	Denmark	2	2	1	5
3	Sweden	0	2	4	6
4	Netherlands	0	0	3	3
5	Scotland	0	0	1	1
Totals (5 entries)		6	6	11	23
