= 1976 European Badminton Championships =

Tournament details
- Dates: 6–7 April 1976
- Edition: 5
- Venue: Fitzwilliam Club
- Location: Dublin, Ireland

The 5th European Badminton Championships were held in Dublin, Ireland, 6–7 April 1976, hosted by the European Badminton Union and the Badminton Union of Ireland.

== Medalists ==
Event	Gold	Silver	Bronze
Men's singles	(Denmark) Flemming Delfs	(Denmark) Elo Hansen	(West Germany) Wolfgang Bochow
Men's singles	(Denmark) Flemming Delfs	(Denmark) Elo Hansen	(England) Paul Whetnall
Women's singles	(England) Gillian Gilks	(Denmark) Lene Køppen	(England) Susan Whetnall
Women's singles	(England) Gillian Gilks	(Denmark) Lene Køppen	(England) Margaret Lockwood
Men's doubles	(England) Ray Stevens and Mike Tredgett	(England) Derek Talbot and Eddy Sutton	(West Germany) Willi Braun and Roland Maywald
Men's doubles	(England) Ray Stevens and Mike Tredgett	(England) Derek Talbot and Eddy Sutton	(Sweden) Bengt Fröman and Thomas Kihlström
Women's doubles	(England) Gillian Gilks and Susan Whetnall	(England) Margaret Lockwood and Nora Gardner	(West Germany) Karin Kucki and Vera Winter
Women's doubles	(England) Gillian Gilks and Susan Whetnall	(England) Margaret Lockwood and Nora Gardner	(Scotland) Joanna Flockhart and Christine Stewart
Mixed doubles	(England) Derek Talbot and Gillian Gilks	(Denmark) Steen Skovgaard and Lene Køppen	(Netherlands) Rob Ridder and Marjan Luesken
Mixed doubles	(England) Derek Talbot and Gillian Gilks	(Denmark) Steen Skovgaard and Lene Køppen	(England) Mike Tredgett and Nora Gardner
Teams	Denmark	England	Sweden

== Semifinals ==
- Source

Discipline	Winner	Runner-up	Score
Men's singles	(Denmark) Elo Hansen	(West Germany) Wolfgang Bochow	9–15, 15–9, 15–8
Men's singles	(Denmark) Flemming Delfs	(England) Paul Whetnall	15–9, 15–7
Women's singles	(England) Gillian Gilks	(England) Susan Whetnall	11–5, 11–2
Women's singles	(Denmark) Lene Køppen	(England) Margaret Lockwood	11–5, 11–5
Men's doubles	(England) Ray Stevens (England) Mike Tredgett	(West Germany) Willi Braun (West Germany) Roland Maywald	15–9, 15–17, 15–9
Men's doubles	(England) Derek Talbot (England) Eddy Sutton	(Sweden) Bengt Fröman (Sweden) Thomas Kihlström	15–13, 15–9
Women's doubles	(England) Gillian Gilks (England) Susan Whetnall	(West Germany) Karin Kucki (West Germany) Vera Winter	15–7, 15–6
Women's doubles	(England) Nora Gardner (England) Margaret Lockwood	(Scotland) Joanna Flockhart (Scotland) Christine Stewart	15–7, 15–8
Mixed doubles	(England) Derek Talbot (England) Gillian Gilks	(Netherlands) Rob Ridder (Netherlands) Marjan Luesken	15–7, 15–12
Mixed doubles	(Denmark) Steen Skovgaard (Denmark) Lene Køppen	(England) Mike Tredgett (England) Nora Gardner	9–15, 15–7, 15–4

== Final results ==
Category	Winners	Runners-up	Score
Men's singles	(Denmark) Flemming Delfs	(Denmark) Elo Hansen	15–4, 15–7
Women's singles	(England) Gillian Gilks	(Denmark) Lene Køppen	11–6, 12–11
Men's doubles	(England) Mike Tredgett (England) Ray Stevens	(England) Derek Talbot (England) Eddy Sutton	13–15, 15–12, 15–6
Women's doubles	(England) Gillian Gilks (England) Susan Whetnall	(England) Margaret Lockwood (England) Nora Gardner	15–8, 15–4
Mixed doubles	(England) Derek Talbot (England) Gillian Gilks	(Denmark) Steen Skovgaard (Denmark) Lene Køppen	6–15, 15–12, 17–15

== Medal account ==
* Host nation (Ireland)

Rank	Nation	Gold	Silver	Bronze	Total
1	England	4	3	4	11
2	Denmark	2	3	0	5
3	West Germany	0	0	3	3
4	Sweden	0	0	2	2
5	Netherlands	0	0	1	1
5	Scotland	0	0	1	1
Totals (6 entries)		6	6	11	23
