= Thomas Kihlström =

Swedish badminton player (born 1948)

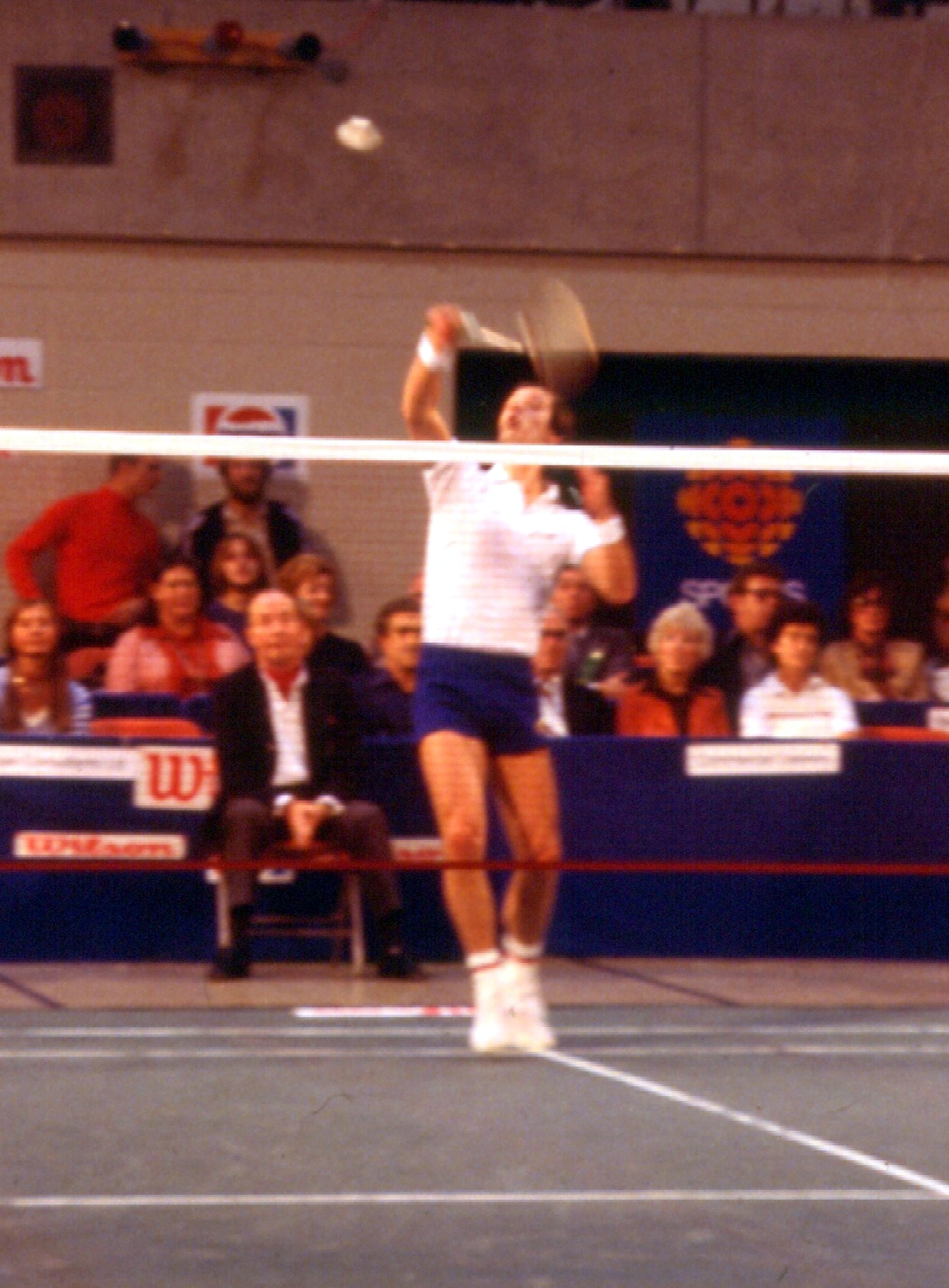
- Kihlström in 1977

Personal information
- Born: 11 December 1948 (age 77)

Sport
- Country: Sweden
- Sport: Badminton
- Handedness: Right
Medal record
Men's badminton
Representing Sweden
World Championships
Gold medal – first place	1983 Copenhagen	Mixed doubles
Bronze medal – third place	1977 Malmö	Men's Singles
Bronze medal – third place	1977 Malmö	Men's doubles
World Games
Gold medal – first place	1981 Santa Clara	Mixed doubles
Silver medal – second place	1981 Santa Clara	Men's doubles
World Cup
Gold medal – first place	1984 Jakarta	Mixed doubles
Bronze medal – third place	1983 Kuala Lumpur	Mixed doubles
Bronze medal – third place	1986 Bandung–Jakarta	Mixed doubles
European Championships
Gold medal – first place	1982 Böblingen	Men's doubles
Silver medal – second place	1974 Vienna	Men's singles
Silver medal – second place	1978 Preston	Men's singles
Silver medal – second place	1978 Preston	Men's doubles
Silver medal – second place	1980 Groningen	Men's doubles
Silver medal – second place	1984 Preston	Mixed doubles
Silver medal – second place	1986 Uppsala	Men's doubles
Bronze medal – third place	1976 Dublin	Men's doubles
Bronze medal – third place	1986 Uppsala	Mixed doubles
European Mixed Team Championships
Silver medal – second place	1982 Böblingen	Mixed team
Bronze medal – third place	1974 Vienna	Mixed team
Bronze medal – third place	1976 Dublin	Mixed team
Bronze medal – third place	1978 Preston	Mixed team
Bronze medal – third place	1980 Groningen	Mixed team
Bronze medal – third place	1984 Preston	Mixed team
Bronze medal – third place	1986 Uppsala	Mixed team

Thomas Kihlström (born 11 December 1948) is a Swedish retired badminton player known for his agility and tactical astuteness. Though an impressive singles player early in his career, his greatest successes came in men's doubles in partnership with Bengt Fröman and Stefan Karlsson and in mixed doubles with a variety of partners.

== Career ==
Kihlström won the 1983 IBF World Championships in mixed doubles with Nora Perry. He also won 16 medals at the European Championships, two of them in men's singles, two in mixed doubles, five in men's doubles and 7 in team competition. He shared two All-England men's doubles titles, one with Bengt Fröman in 1976 and the other with Stefan Karlsson in 1983. He also shared the All-England mixed doubles title with Nora Perry in 1983. From 1973 to 1988, Kihlström captured a total of twenty-four events at the Swedish National Championships. Kihlström competed during an era in which world class badminton became increasingly event-specialized. His skill as an "all-arounder" is demonstrated by the facts that he is the only player to have won medals in all three events, men's singles, men's doubles, and mixed doubles at the BWF World Championships, and is the only man to have won each of these three events at the Japan Open.

== Achievements ==
=== World Championships ===
Men's singles
Year	Venue	Opponent	Score	Result
1977	Malmö Isstadion, Malmö, Sweden	(Denmark) Svend Pri	6–15, 6–15	Bronze

Men's doubles
Year	Venue	Partner	Opponent	Score	Result
1977	Malmö Isstadion, Malmö, Sweden	(Sweden) Bengt Fröman	(Indonesia) Tjun Tjun (Indonesia) Johan Wahjudi	7–15, 11–15	Bronze

Mixed doubles
Year	Venue	Partner	Opponent	Score	Result
1983	Brøndbyhallen, Copenhagen, Denmark	(England) Nora Perry	(Denmark) Steen Fladberg (Denmark) Pia Nielsen	15–1, 15–11	Gold

=== World Cup ===
Mixed doubles
Year	Venue	Partner	Opponent	Score	Result
1983	Stadium Negara, Kuala Lumpur, Malaysia	(England) Karen Chapman	(Indonesia) Christian Hadinata (Indonesia) Ivana Lie	15–12, 10–15, 4–15	Bronze
1984	Istora Senayan, Jakarta, Indonesia	(England) Nora Perry	(Indonesia) Christian Hadinata (Indonesia) Ivana Lie	15–18, 15–13, 15–8	Gold
1986	Istora Senayan, Jakarta, Indonesia	(Sweden) Christine Magnusson	(Denmark) Steen Fladberg (England) Gillian Clark	4–15, 15–8, 7–15	Bronze

=== World Games ===
Men's doubles
Year	Venue	Partner	Opponent	Score	Result
1981	San Jose Civic Auditorium, California, United States	(Sweden) Stefan Karlsson	(China) Sun Zhian (China) Yao Ximing	15–12, 4–15, 6–15	Silver

Mixed doubles
Year	Venue	Partner	Opponent	Score	Result
1981	San Jose Civic Auditorium, California, United States	(United Kingdom) Gillian Gilks	(United Kingdom) Mike Tredgett (United Kingdom) Nora Perry	15–6, 18–14	Gold

=== European Championships ===
Men's singles
Year	Venue	Opponent	Score	Result
1974	Stadthalle, Vienna, Austria	(Sweden) Sture Johnsson	7–15, 8–15	Silver
1978	Guild Hall, Preston, England	(Denmark) Flemming Delfs	15–10, 6–15, 12–15	Silver

Men's doubles
Year	Venue	Partner	Opponent	Score	Result
1976	Fitzwilliam Club, Dublin, Ireland	(Sweden) Bengt Fröman	(England) Eddy Sutton (England) Derek Talbot	13–15, 9–15	Bronze
1978	Guild Hall, Preston, England	(Sweden) Bengt Fröman	(England) Ray Stevens (England) Mike Tredgett	6–15, 5–15	Silver
1980	Martinihal, Groningen, Netherlands	(Sweden) Bengt Fröman	(Sweden) Stefan Karlsson (Sweden) Claes Nordin	16–18, 15–9, 13–15	Silver
1982	Sporthalle, Böblingen, West Germany	(Sweden) Stefan Karlsson	(England) Mike Tredgett (England) Martin Dew	15–9, 15–3	Gold
1986	Fyrishallen, Uppsala, Sweden	(Sweden) Stefan Karlsson	(Denmark) Steen Fladberg (Denmark) Jesper Helledie	12–15, 17–18	Silver

Mixed doubles
Year	Venue	Partner	Opponent	Score	Result
1984	Guild Hall, Preston, England	(Sweden) Maria Bengtsson	(England) Martin Dew (England) Gillian Gilks	5–15, 15–17	Silver
1986	Fyrishallen, Uppsala, Sweden	(Sweden) Maria Bengtsson	(England) Martin Dew (England) Gillian Gilks	8–15, 8–15	Bronze

=== IBF World Grand Prix ===
The World Badminton Grand Prix was sanctioned by the International Badminton Federation from 1983 to 2006.

Men's doubles
Year	Tournament	Partner	Opponent	Score	Result
1983	Swedish Open	(Sweden) Stefan Karlsson	(Denmark) Steen Fladberg (Denmark) Jesper Helledie	15–4, 13–15, 10–15	(silver) Runner-up
1983	All England Open	(Sweden) Stefan Karlsson	(England) Martin Dew (England) Mike Tredgett	15–10, 15–13	(gold) Winner
1984	Chinese Taipei Open	(Sweden) Stefan Karlsson	(Denmark) Steen Fladberg (Denmark) Jesper Helledie	15–3, 15–6	(gold) Winner
1984	Japan Open	(Sweden) Stefan Karlsson	(England) Martin Dew (England) Steve Baddeley	15–6, 15–6	(gold) Winner
1984	Swedish Open	(Sweden) Stefan Karlsson	(South Korea) Kim Moon-soo (South Korea) Park Joo-bong	8–15, 15–10, 8–15	(silver) Runner-up
1985	Swedish Open	(Sweden) Stefan Karlsson	(China) Ding Qiqing (China) Li Yongbo	12–15, 18–14, 15–18	(silver) Runner-up

Mixed doubles
Year	Tournament	Partner	Opponent	Score	Result
1983	Swedish Open	(England) Nora Perry	(England) Dipak Tailor (England) Barbara Sutton	15–7, 15–1	(gold) Winner
1983	All England Open	(England) Nora Perry	(Denmark) Steen Skovgaard (Denmark) Anne Skovgaard	18–16, 11–15, 15–6	(gold) Winner
1985	Swedish Open	(Sweden) Maria Bengtsson	(South Korea) Lee Deuk-choon (South Korea) Chung Myung-hee	15–5, 11–15, 15–7	(gold) Winner
1985	All England Open	(England) Gillian Clark	(Scotland) Billy Gilliland (England) Nora Perry	10–15, 12–15	(silver) Runner-up
1986	World Grand Prix Finals	(Sweden) Christine Magnusson	(England) Nigel Tier (England) Gillian Gowers	15–8, 4–15, 8–15	(silver) Runner-up

=== International tournaments ===
Men's singles
Year	Tournament	Opponent	Score	Result
1972	Nordic Championships	(Sweden) Sture Johnsson	3–15, 14–17	(silver) Runner-up
1972	Norwegian International	(Norway) Petter Thoresen	15–7, 15–4	(gold) Winner
1973	USSR International	(Germany) Wolfgang Bochow	10–15, 15–4, 8–15	(silver) Runner-up
1973	Norwegian International	(Denmark) Elo Hansen	10–15, 8–15	(silver) Runner-up
1975	Mexican Open	(Sweden) Sture Johnsson	6–15, 15–11, 15–11	(gold) Winner
1976	U.S. Open	(England) Paul Whetnall	14–17, 10–15	(silver) Runner-up
1977	Canada Open	(Denmark) Flemming Delfs	15–12, 7–15, 10–15	(silver) Runner-up
1977	Japan Open	(Denmark) Flemming Delfs	9–15, 15–13, 15–10	(gold) Winner
1977	Nordic Championships	(Denmark) Flemming Delfs	10–15, 15–9, 13–15	(silver) Runner-up
1978	Denmark Open	(Indonesia) Liem Swie King	15–8, 9–15, 7–15	(silver) Runner-up
1978	Canada Open	(Denmark) Flemming Delfs	17–14, 11–15, 16–18	(silver) Runner-up
1980	Norwegian International	(Denmark) Kenneth Larsen	15–0, 15–11	(gold) Winner
1980	Victor Cup	(Denmark) Flemming Delfs	15–7, 15–10	(gold) Winner
1980	Nordic Championships	(Denmark) Morten Frost	4–15, 7–15	(silver) Runner-up
1981	Canada Open	(England) Nick Yates	16–17, 12–15	(silver) Runner-up

Men's doubles
Year	Tournament	Partner	Opponent	Score	Result
1971	Norwegian International	(Sweden) Kurt Johnsson	(Sweden) Bengt Fröman (Sweden) Sture Johnsson	15–12, 15–9	(gold) Winner
1972	Norwegian International	(Sweden) Bengt Fröman	(Denmark) Klaus Kaagaard (Denmark) Per Walsøe	14–18, 13–18	(silver) Runner-up
1973	USSR International	(Sweden) Bengt Fröman	(Germany) Wolfgang Bochow (Germany) Roland Maywald	15–13, 15–10	(gold) Winner
1973	Norwegian International	(Sweden) Bengt Fröman	(Scotland) Fraser Gow (Scotland) Robert McCoig	7–15, 18–15, 15–18	(gold) Winner
1975	German Open	(Sweden) Bengt Fröman	(England) David Eddy (England) Eddy Sutton	15–13, 15–5	(gold) Winner
1975	Norwegian International	(Sweden) Bengt Fröman	(Denmark) Flemming Delfs (Denmark) Elo Hansen	15–5, 5–15, 17–18	(silver) Runner-up
1975	Nordic Championships	(Sweden) Bengt Fröman	(Denmark) Flemming Delfs (Denmark) Elo Hansen	15–9, 15–2	(gold) Winner
1975	Mexican Open	(Sweden) Sture Johnsson	(Denmark) Flemming Delfs (Denmark) Elo Hansen	15–11, 13–15, 5–15	(silver) Runner-up
1976	German Open	(Sweden) Bengt Fröman	(England) Ray Stevens (England) Mike Tredgett	17–15, 17–15	(gold) Winner
1976	All England Open	(Sweden) Bengt Fröman	(Denmark) Svend Pri (Denmark) Steen Skovgaard	15–12, 17–15	(gold) Winner
1976	Norwegian International	(Sweden) Bengt Fröman	(Denmark) Flemming Delfs (Denmark) Elo Hansen	15–6, 15–12	(gold) Winner
1976	Nordic Championships	(Sweden) Bengt Fröman	(Denmark) Svend Pri (Denmark) Steen Skovgaard	15–10, 15–1	(gold) Winner
1976	U.S. Open	(Sweden) Bengt Fröman	(Germany) Willi Braun (Germany) Roland Maywald	15–18, 12–15	(silver) Runner-up
1977	Swedish Open	(Sweden) Bengt Fröman	(Indonesia) Ade Chandra (Indonesia) Tjun Tjun	18–17, 16–17, 11–15	(silver) Runner-up
1977	German Open	(Sweden) Bengt Fröman	(Denmark) Gert Hansen (Denmark) Steen Skovgaard	15–12, 15–9	(gold) Winner
1977	Denmark Open	(Sweden) Bengt Fröman	(Denmark) Flemming Delfs (Denmark) Steen Skovgaard	15–6, 15–8	(gold) Winner
1977	Canada Open	(Sweden) Bengt Fröman	(England) Eddy Sutton (England) Derek Talbot	16–17, 15–11, 15–10	(gold) Winner
1977	Nordic Championships	(Sweden) Bengt Fröman	(Denmark) Flemming Delfs (Denmark) Steen Skovgaard	4–15, 15–12, 15–12	(gold) Winner
1978	Swedish Open	(Sweden) Bengt Fröman	(Denmark) Flemming Delfs (Denmark) Steen Skovgaard	18–15, 9–15, 8–15	(silver) Runner-up
1978	Nordic Championships	(Sweden) Bengt Fröman	(Denmark) Flemming Delfs (Denmark) Steen Skovgaard	5–15, 9–15	(silver) Runner-up
1978	Canada Open	(Sweden) Bengt Fröman	(Denmark) Flemming Delfs (Denmark) Steen Skovgaard	9–15, 15–10 retired	(gold) Winner
1979	English Masters	(Sweden) Bengt Fröman	(England) Ray Stevens (England) Mike Tredgett	18–16, 15–9	(gold) Winner
1979	Nordic Championships	(Sweden) Bengt Fröman	(Denmark) Flemming Delfs (Denmark) Steen Skovgaard	13–15, 15–11, 17–14	(gold) Winner
1979	Polish International	(Sweden) Tor Sundberg	(Czech Republic) Michal Malý (Czech Republic) Juraj Lenart	15–3, 15–13	(gold) Winner
1980	Swedish Open	(Sweden) Bengt Fröman	(Indonesia) Ade Chandra (Indonesia) Christian Hadinata	5–15, 15–12, 9–15	(silver) Runner-up
1980	English Masters	(Sweden) Stefan Karlsson	(Indonesia) Ade Chandra (Indonesia) Christian Hadinata	12–15, 12–15	(silver) Runner-up
1980	Norwegian International	(Sweden) Lars Wengberg	(Denmark) Peter Holm (Denmark) Hans Olaf Birkholm	15–7, 15–11	(gold) Winner
1980	Victor Cup	(Sweden) Claes Nordin	(Denmark) Flemming Delfs (Denmark) Steen Skovgaard	15–5, 18–17	(gold) Winner
1981	Copenhagen Cup	(Sweden) Stefan Karlsson	(Indonesia) Rudy Heryanto (Indonesia) Kartono	15–10, 12–15, 17–15	(gold) Winner
1981	Swedish Open	(Sweden) Stefan Karlsson	(Indonesia) Bobby Ertanto (Indonesia) Hadibowo	15–6, 15–4	(gold) Winner
1981	English Masters	(Sweden) Stefan Karlsson	(England) Martin Dew (England) Mike Tredgett	9–15, 15–2, 10–15	(silver) Runner-up
1981	Canada Open	(England) Ray Stevens	(England) Steve Baddeley (England) Martin Dew	15–8, 15–11	(gold) Winner
1981	India Open	(Sweden) Stefan Karlsson	(Indonesia) Rudy Heryanto (Indonesia) Kartono	6–15, 15–8, 17–15	(gold) Winner
1982	Swedish Open	(Sweden) Stefan Karlsson	(Indonesia) Christian Hadinata (Indonesia) Lius Pongoh	11–15, 8–15	(silver) Runner-up
1982	India Open	(Sweden) Stefan Karlsson	(South Korea) Park Joo-bong (South Korea) Lee Eun-ku	15–10, 15–12	(gold) Winner
1982	Scandinavian Cup	(Sweden) Stefan Karlsson	(Denmark) Steen Fladberg (Denmark) Steen Skovgaard	15–13, 13–15, 15–10	(gold) Winner
1983	Chinese Taipei Open	(Sweden) Stefan Karlsson	(Indonesia) Bobby Ertanto (Indonesia) Hadibowo	9–15, 11–15	(silver) Runner-up
1983	Japan Open	(Sweden) Stefan Karlsson	(Indonesia) Rudy Heryanto (Malaysia) Razif Sidek	18–14, 6–15, 15–6	(gold) Winner
1983	English Masters	(Sweden) Stefan Karlsson	(Indonesia) Rudy Heryanto (Indonesia) Kartono	12–15, 15–8, 15–11	(gold) Winner
1983	Nordic Championships	(Sweden) Stefan Karlsson	(Denmark) Morten Frost (Denmark) Jens Peter Nierhoff	15–12, 17–15	(gold) Winner
1984	Nordic Championships	(Sweden) Stefan Karlsson	(Denmark) Mark Christiansen (Denmark) Michael Kjeldsen	15–11, 14–18, 18–14	(gold) Winner
1985	Nordic Championships	(Sweden) Stefan Karlsson	(Denmark) Mark Christiansen (Denmark) Michael Kjeldsen	15–6, 15–6	(gold) Winner

Mixed doubles

Year	Tournament	Partner	Opponent	Score	Result
1975	Mexican Open	(United States) Judianne Kelly	(Sweden) Sture Johnsson (Peru) Ofelia de Telge	15–9, 15–8	(gold) Winner
1976	U.S. Open	(United States) Pam Brady	(England) David Eddy (England) Susan Whetnall	6–15, 15–10, 12–15	(silver) Runner-up
1981	Dutch Open	(England) Gillian Gilks	(England) Mike Tredgett (England) Nora Perry	15–12, 15–6	(gold) Winner
1981	Canada Open	(England) Gillian Gilks	(England) Ray Stevens (England) Nora Perry	12–15, 15–6, 15–0	(gold) Winner
1982	Denmark Open	(England) Nora Perry	(England) Martin Dew (England) Gillian Gilks	15–11, 15–9	(gold) Winner
1982	Victor Cup	(England) Nora Perry	(England) Martin Dew (England) Gillian Gilks	9–15, 15–9, 15–9	(gold) Winner
1982	Scandinavian Cup	(England) Nora Perry	(Denmark) Steen Fladberg (Denmark) Pia Nielsen	18–15, 15–12	(gold) Winner
1982	Nordic Championships	(Sweden) Maria Bengtsson	(Denmark) Steen Skovgaard (Denmark) Hanne Adsbøl	6–15, 10–15	(silver) Runner-up
1982	India Open	(England) Jane Webster	(Scotland) Billy Gilliland (England) Karen Chapman	14–18, 11–15	(silver) Runner-up
1983	Japan Open	(England) Nora Perry	(England) Martin Dew (England) Jane Webster	15–5, 15–2	(gold) Winner
1983	Nordic Championships	(Sweden) Maria Bengtsson	(Denmark) Steen Fladberg (Denmark) Grete Mogensen	15–2, 9–15, 15–5	(gold) Winner
1985	Malaysia Master	(Sweden) Christine Magnusson	(Denmark) Steen Fladberg (England) Nora Perry	9–15, 5–15	(silver) Runner-up
1985	Malaysia Master	(Sweden) Christine Magnusson	(England) Martin Dew (England) Gillian Gilks	17–15, 15–12	(silver) Runner-up
1985	Malaysia Master	(Sweden) Christine Magnusson	(Sweden) Stefan Karlsson (Sweden) Maria Bengtsson	15–10, 9–15, 10–15	(silver) Runner-up
1985	Nordic Championships	(Sweden) Christine Magnusson	(Sweden) Stefan Karlsson (Sweden) Maria Bengtsson	9–15, 7–15	(silver) Runner-up
