= Eddy Sutton =

English badminton player

Personal information
- Born: 1948 (age 77–78) Stoke, England

Sport
- Country: England
- Sport: Badminton
Medal record
Men's badminton
Representing England
European Championships
Silver medal – second place	1976 Dublin	Men's doubles
Bronze medal – third place	1978 Preston	Men's doubles
European Mixed Team Championships
Gold medal – first place	1978 Preston	Mixed team
Silver medal – second place	1976 Dublin	Mixed team

Edward H Sutton (born 1948) is an English former badminton international player and a former national champion.

== Biography ==
Sutton became the English National doubles champion after winning the English National Badminton Championships in 1975 with David Eddy. Sutton played for Staffordshire and England and was also won the men's doubles title at the Denmark Open in 1975 and the Czechoslovakian International in 1978.

He was a teacher by trade and married fellow badminton player Barbara Giles on 22 October 1977.

== Achievements ==
=== European Championships ===
Men's doubles
Year	Venue	Partner	Opponent	Score	Result
1976	Fitzwilliam Club, Dublin, Ireland	(England) Derek Talbot	(England) Ray Stevens (England) Mike Tredgett	15–13, 12–15, 6–15	Silver
1978	Guild Hall, Preston, England	(England) David Eddy	(Sweden) Bengt Fröman (Sweden) Thomas Kihlström	9–15, 5–15	Bronze

=== International tournaments (9 titles, 10 runners-up) ===
Men's singles
Year	Tournament	Opponent	Score	Result
1972	Portugal International	(England) Philip Smith	6–15, 11–15	(silver) Runner-up

Men's doubles
Year	Tournament	Partner	Opponent	Score	Result
1972	Portugal International	(England) William Kidd	(England) David Hutchinson (England) Philip Smith	15–11, 15–9	(gold) Winner
1973	Dutch Open	(England) David Eddy	(England) Derek Talbot (England) Elliot Stuart	15–12, 18–15	(gold) Winner
1975	Dutch Open	(England) David Eddy	(England) Ray Stevens (England) Mike Tredgett	12–15, 9–15	(silver) Runner-up
1976	Denmark Open	(England) David Eddy	(Denmark) Flemming Delfs (Denmark) Elo Hansen	15–13, 15–11	(gold) Winner
1976	German Open	(England) David Eddy	(Sweden) Bengt Fröman (Sweden) Thomas Kihlström	13–15, 5–15	(silver) Runner-up
1976	Welsh International	(England) David Eddy	(England) Alan Connor (England) William Kidd	15–7, 13–18, 15–7	(gold) Winner
1977	Dutch Open	(England) David Eddy	(Denmark) Elo Hansen (Denmark) Steen Skovgaard	6–15, 15–8, 17–15	(gold) Winner
1977	Welsh International	(England) David Eddy	(England) Elliot Stuart (England) Mike Tredgett	9–13 retired	(gold) Winner
1977	Canadian Open	(England) Derek Talbot	(Sweden) Bengt Fröman (Sweden) Thomas Kihlström	17–16, 11–15, 10–15	(silver) Runner-up
1978	Welsh International	(England) David Eddy	(England) Ray Stevens (England) Mike Tredgett	8–15, 3–15	(silver) Runner-up
1978	Czechoslovakian International	(England) Alan Connor	(Netherlands) Clemens Wortel (Netherlands) Guus van der Vlugt	15–10, 18–14	(gold) Winner
1979	Denmark Open	(England) David Eddy	(Japan) Yoshitaka Iino (Japan) Masao Tsuchida	9–15, 7–15	(silver) Runner-up
1981	Welsh International	(England) David Eddy	(England) Tim Stokes (Wales) Mark Richards	15–11, 15–6	(gold) Winner
1981	Victor Cup	(Scotland) Billy Gilliland	(Indonesia) Arya Aslim (Indonesia) Bambang Dihardja	4–15, 15–8, 15–13	(silver) Runner-up
1982	Bell's Open	(England) David Eddy	(Denmark) Claus Thomsen (Denmark) Nils Skeby	18–15, 10–15, 15–8	(gold) Winner

Mixed doubles
Year	Tournament	Partner	Opponent	Score	Result
1972	Portugal International	(England) Nora Perry	(England) William Kidd (England) Barbara Giles	4–15, 15–11, 10–15	(silver) Runner-up
1981	Welsh International	(England) Karen Bridge	(Scotland) Billy Gilliland (England) Karen Chapman	15–10, 9–15, 11–15	(silver) Runner-up
1983	Bell's Open	(Scotland) Alison Fulton	(England) Duncan Bridge (England) Karen Beckman	8–15, 12–15	(silver) Runner-up
