= Steen Skovgaard =

Danish badminton player

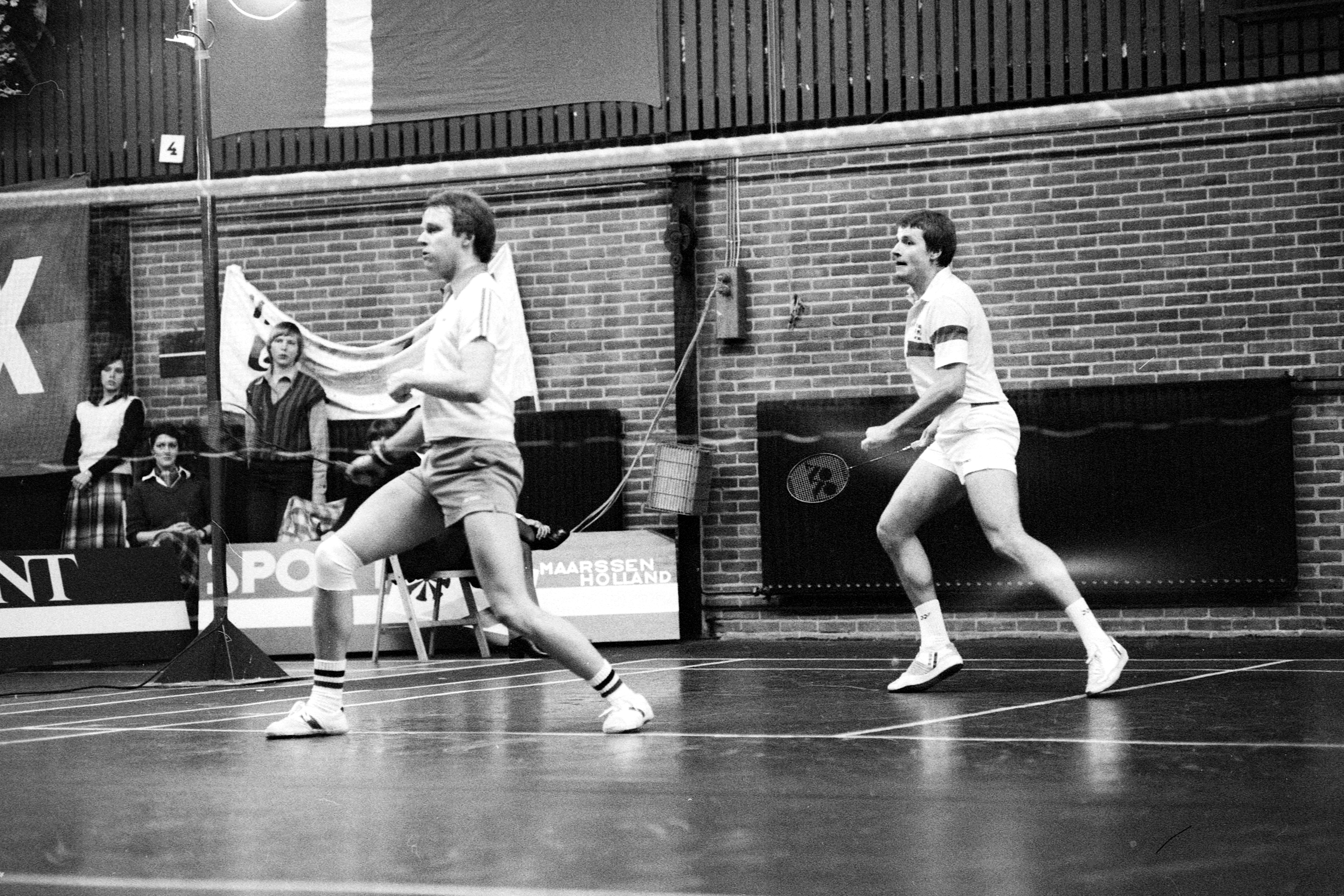

Personal information
- Born: 1950 (age 75–76)

Sport
- Country: Denmark
- Sport: Badminton
- Event: Doubles
Medal record
Men's badminton
Representing Denmark
World Championships
Gold medal – first place	1977 Malmö	Mixed doubles
Bronze medal – third place	1980 Jakarta	Men's doubles
Bronze medal – third place	1980 Jakarta	Mixed Doubles
World Games
Bronze medal – third place	1981 Santa Clara	Mixed doubles
World Cup
Silver medal – second place	1980 Kyoto	Men's doubles
Bronze medal – third place	1979 Tokyo	Men's doubles
Thomas Cup
Silver medal – second place	1979 Jakarta	Men's team
Bronze medal – third place	1982 London	Men's team
European Championships
Gold medal – first place	1976 Dublin	Mixed team
Gold medal – first place	1980 Groningen	Mixed team
Silver medal – second place	1976 Dublin	Mixed doubles
Silver medal – second place	1978 Preston	Mixed doubles
Silver medal – second place	1978 Preston	Mixed team
Bronze medal – third place	1980 Groningen	Men's doubles
Bronze medal – third place	1982 Böblingen	Mixed doubles
Bronze medal – third place	1982 Böblingen	Mixed team

Steen Skovgaard is a retired male badminton player from Denmark who specialized in the doubles events and won national and international titles in both men's doubles and mixed doubles from the mid-1970s through the early 1980s. He played for the Gentofte BK.

== Career ==
The tall, hard-hitting Skovgaard won the gold medal at the 1977 IBF World Championships in mixed doubles with Lene Køppen, defeating Derek Talbot and Gillian Gilks by 15–12, 18–17 in the final. They also won the bronze medal at the 1980 IBF World Championships.

At the European Badminton Championships they won two silver medals, in 1976 and 1978. In 1980 Skovgaard won a bronze medal in men's doubles with Flemming Delfs, and in 1982 another bronze medal in mixed doubles with his wife, Anne Skovgaard.

== Later life ==
After ending his active career, Skovgaard became a coach in Gentofte BK. He has also been used as a badminton commentator by TV2 Sporten.

He has since 1981 worked for companies such as IBM Denmark, Errpege IBS, Kraks Forklag and Mercuri Urval. In 2004, he became a co-owner of People Capital Partner. In 2010, he became partner in the recruitment company Hansen Toft A/S.

== Achievements ==
=== World Championships ===
Men's doubles
Year	Venue	Partner	Opponent	Score	Result
1980	Istora Senayan, Jakarta, Indonesia	(Denmark) Flemming Delfs	(Indonesia) Rudy Heryanto (Indonesia) Hariamanto Kartono	7–15, 7–15	Bronze

Mixed doubles
Year	Venue	Partner	Opponent	Score	Result
1977	Malmö Isstadion, Malmö, Sweden	(Denmark) Lene Køppen	(England) Derek Talbot (England) Gillian Gilks	15–12, 18–17	Gold
1980	Istora Senayan, Jakarta Indonesia	(Denmark) Lene Køppen	(Indonesia) Christian Hadinata (Indonesia) Imelda Wiguna	11–15, 6–15	Bronze

=== World Games ===
Mixed doubles
Year	Venue	Partner	Opponent	Score	Result
1981	San Jose Civic Auditorium, California, United States	(Denmark) Lene Køppen	(United Kingdom) Mike Tredgett (United Kingdom) Nora Perry	15–11, 4–15, 8–15	Bronze

=== World Cup ===
Men's doubles
Year	Venue	Partner	Opponent	Score	Result
1979	Tokyo, Japan	(Denmark) Flemming Delfs	(Japan) Masao Tsuchida (Japan) Yoshitaka Iino	13–15, 10–15	Bronze
1980	Kyoto, Japan	(Denmark) Flemming Delfs	(Indonesia) Ade Chandra (Indonesia) Christian Hadinata	6–15, 3–15	Silver

=== European Championships ===
Men's doubles
Year	Venue	Partner	Opponent	Score	Result
1980	Martinihal, Groningen, Netherlands	(Denmark) Flemming Delfs	(Sweden) Stefan Karlsson (Sweden) Claes Nordin	3–15, 13–18	Bronze

Mixed doubles
Year	Venue	Partner	Opponent	Score	Result
1976	Fitzwilliam Club, Dublin. Ireland	(Denmark) Lene Køppen	(England) Derek Talbot (England) Gillian Gilks	15–6, 12–15, 15–17	Silver
1978	Guild Hall, Preston, England	(Denmark) Lene Køppen	(England) Mike Tredgett (England) Nora Perry	9–15, 10–15	Silver
1982	Sporthalle, Böblingen, West Germany	(Denmark) Anne Skovgaard	(England) Martin Dew (England) Gillian Gilks	12–15, 8–15	Bronze

=== IBF World Grand Prix (2 runners-up) ===
The World Badminton Grand Prix was sanctioned by the International Badminton Federation from 1983 to 2006.

Mixed doubles
Year	Tournament	Partner	Opponent	Score	Result
1983	Dutch Open	(Denmark) Anne Skovgaard	(England) Martin Dew (England) Gillian Gilks	10–15, 16–17	(silver) Runner-up
1983	All England Open	(Denmark) Anne Skovgaard	(Sweden) Thomas Kihlström (England) Nora Perry	16–18, 15–11, 6–15	(silver) Runner-up

=== International tournaments (22 titles, 25 runners-up) ===
Men's doubles
Year	Tournament	Partner	Opponent	Score	Result
1976	Nordic Championships	(Denmark) Svend Pri	(Sweden) Bengt Fröman (Sweden) Thomas Kihlström	10–15, 1–15	(silver) Runner-up
1976	Dutch Open	(Denmark) Klaus Kaagaard	(Denmark) Flemming Delfs (Denmark) Elo Hansen	6–15, 12–15	(silver) Runner-up
1976	All England Open	(Denmark) Svend Pri	(Sweden) Bengt Fröman (Sweden) Thomas Kihlström	12–15, 15–17	(silver) Runner-up
1977	Japan Open	(Denmark) Flemming Delfs	(Japan) Nobutaka Ikeda (Japan) Shoichi Toganoo	15–9, 15–2	(gold) Winner
1977	Dutch Open	(Denmark) Elo Hansen	(England) David Eddy (England) Eddy Sutton	15–6, 8–15, 15–17	(silver) Runner-up
1977	German Open	(Denmark) Gert Hansen	(Sweden) Bengt Fröman (Sweden) Thomas Kihlström	12–15, 9–15	(silver) Runner-up
1977	Nordic Championships	(Denmark) Flemming Delfs	(Sweden) Bengt Fröman (Sweden) Thomas Kihlström	15–4, 12–15, 12–15	(silver) Runner-up
1977	Denmark Open	(Denmark) Flemming Delfs	(Sweden) Bengt Fröman (Sweden) Thomas Kihlström	6–15, 8–15	(silver) Runner-up
1978	Denmark Open	(Denmark) Flemming Delfs	(Indonesia) Christian Hadinata (Indonesia) Ade Chandra	15–6, 15–11	(gold) Winner
1978	Canada Open	(Denmark) Flemming Delfs	(Sweden) Bengt Fröman (Sweden) Thomas Kihlström	15–9, 10–15, retired	(silver) Runner-up
1978	Nordic Championships	(Denmark) Flemming Delfs	(Sweden) Bengt Fröman (Sweden) Thomas Kihlström	15–4, 15–9	(gold) Winner
1978	Swedish Open	(Denmark) Flemming Delfs	(Sweden) Bengt Fröman (Sweden) Thomas Kihlström	15–18, 15–9, 15–8	(gold) Winner
1979	Nordic Championships	(Denmark) Flemming Delfs	(Sweden) Bengt Fröman (Sweden) Thomas Kihlström	15–13, 11–15, 14–17	(silver) Runner-up
1979	Swedish Open	(Denmark) Flemming Delfs	(Denmark) Steen Fladberg (Denmark) Morten Frost	15–12, 12–15, 15–10	(gold) Winner
1980	Copenhagen Cup	(Denmark) Flemming Delfs	(Denmark) Steen Fladberg (Denmark) Morten Frost	15–8, 15–6	(gold) Winner
1980	Denmark Open	(Denmark) Flemming Delfs	(Indonesia) Christian Hadinata (Indonesia) Ade Chandra	15–10, 10–15, 15–10	(gold) Winner
1980	German Open	(Denmark) Jens Peter Nierhoff	(Denmark) Kenneth Larsen (Denmark) Mogens Neergaard	15–6, 15–11	(gold) Winner
1980	Chinese Taipei Open	(Denmark) Flemming Delfs	(Indonesia) Hadibowo Susanto (Indonesia) Bobby Ertanto	13–18, 5–15	(silver) Runner-up
1980	Victor Cup	(Denmark) Flemming Delfs	(Sweden) Claes Nordin (Sweden) Thomas Kihlström	5–15, 17–18	(silver) Runner-up
1981	Nordic Championships	(Denmark) Flemming Delfs	(Denmark) Steen Fladberg (Denmark) Morten Frost	9–15, 5–15	(silver) Runner-up
1982	Scandinavian Cup	(Denmark) Jesper Helledie	(Sweden) Stefan Karlsson (Sweden) Thomas Kihlström	13–15, 15–13, 10–15	(silver) Runner-up
1982	Nordic Championships	(Denmark) Jesper Helledie	(Denmark) Steen Fladberg (Denmark) Morten Frost	6–15, 18–15, 6–15	(silver) Runner-up

Mixed doubles
Year	Tournament	Partner	Opponent	Score	Result
1975	Nordic Championships	(Denmark) Lene Køppen	(Sweden) Bengt Fröman (Sweden) Karin Lindquist	15–5, 15–3	(gold) Winner
1976	Swedish Open	(Denmark) Lene Køppen	(England) Peter Bullivant (England) Gillian Gilks	15–6, 15–3	(gold) Winner
1976	German Open	(Denmark) Lene Køppen	(England) Mike Tredgett (England) Nora Gardner	9–15, 10–15	(silver) Runner-up
1976	Nordic Championships	(Denmark) Lene Køppen	(Denmark) Elo Hansen (Denmark) Pernille Kaagaard	15–0, 15–6	(gold) Winner
1976	Denmark Open	(Denmark) Lene Køppen	(England) David Eddy (England) Barbara Giles	15–8, 15–4	(gold) Winner
1977	Nordic Championships	(Denmark) Lene Køppen	(Denmark) Mogens Neergaard (Denmark) Inge Borgstrøm	15–3, 15–2	(gold) Winner
1977	Dutch Open	(Netherlands) Joke van Beusekom	(England) Derek Talbot (England) Gillian Gilks	7–15, 10–15	(silver) Runner-up
1977	Swedish Open	(Denmark) Lene Køppen	(England) Derek Talbot (England) Gillian Gilks	6–15, 9–15	(silver) Runner-up
1977	Denmark Open	(Denmark) Lene Køppen	(England) David Eddy (England) Barbara Giles	15–12, 15–8	(gold) Winner
1977	Canadian Open	(England) Jane Webster	(England) David Eddy (England) Nora Perry	4–15, 12–15	(silver) Runner-up
1978	All England Open	(Denmark) Lene Køppen	(England) Mike Tredgett (England) Nora Perry	7–11, 4–11	(silver) Runner-up
1978	Nordic Championships	(Denmark) Lene Køppen	(Sweden) Lars Wengberg (Sweden) Anette Börjesson	15–11, 15–10	(gold) Winner
1978	Swedish Open	(Denmark) Lene Køppen	(England) Mike Tredgett (England) Nora Perry	2–15, 9–15	(silver) Runner-up
1978	Denmark Open	(Denmark) Lene Køppen	(England) Mike Tredgett (England) Nora Perry	15–9, 15–11	(gold) Winner
1978	Canadian Open	(Canada) Wendy Clarkson	(Canada) Paul Johnson (Canada) Claire Backhouse		(gold) Winner
1979	Nordic Championships	(Denmark) Lene Køppen	(Denmark) Jan Hammergaard (Denmark) Inge Borgstrøm	15–6, 15–2	(gold) Winner
1979	Swedish Open	(Denmark) Lene Køppen	(England) Mike Tredgett (England) Nora Perry	15–12, 17–18, 16–18	(silver) Runner-up
1979	Denmark Open	(Denmark) Lene Køppen	(England) Ray Stevens (England) Nora Perry	12–15, 15–11, 13–15	(silver) Runner-up
1980	Nordic Championships	(Denmark) Lene Køppen	(Sweden) Lars Wengberg (Sweden) Anette Börjesson	15–6, 15–5	(gold) Winner
1980	Denmark Open	(Denmark) Lene Køppen	(England) Mike Tredgett (England) Nora Perry	11–15, 8–15	(silver) Runner-up
1980	German Open	(Denmark) Anne Skovgaard	(Scotland) Billy Gilliland (Scotland) Christine Heatly	15–6, 15–11	(gold) Winner
1980	Victor Cup	(Denmark) Helle Hartwig	(England) Kevin Jolly (England) Nora Perry	0–15, 9–15	(silver) Runner-up
1981	Nordic Championships	(Denmark) Lene Køppen	(Sweden) Lars Wengberg (Sweden) Anette Börjesson	17–14, 15–9	(gold) Winner
1982	Dutch Open	(Denmark) Dorte Kjær	(England) Martin Dew (England) Gillian Gilks	14–17, 17–14, 8–15	(silver) Runner-up
1982	Nordic Championships	(Denmark) Hanne Adsbøl	(Sweden) Thomas Kihlström (Sweden) Maria Bengtsson	15–6, 15–10	(gold) Winner
