= Flemming Delfs =

Danish badminton player

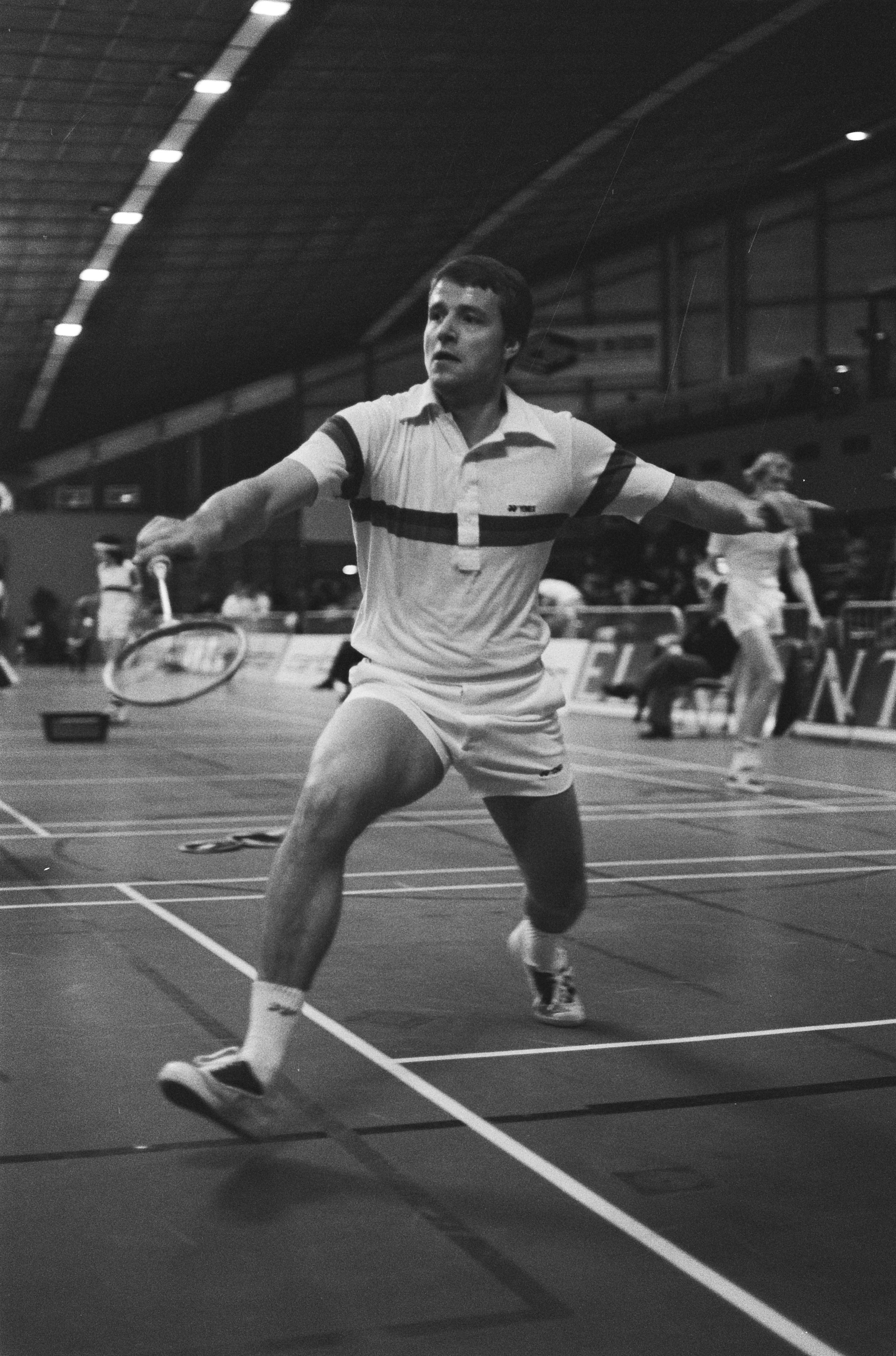

Personal information
- Born: 7 September 1951 (age 75)

Sport
- Country: Denmark
- Sport: Badminton
- Handedness: Right

Men's singles
- Highest ranking: 1 (1977)
Medal record
Men's badminton
Representing Denmark
World Championships
Gold medal – first place	1977 Malmö	Men's Singles
Bronze medal – third place	1980 Jakarta	Men's doubles
World Cup
Silver medal – second place	1980 Kyoto	Men's doubles
Bronze medal – third place	1979 Tokyo	Men's singles
Bronze medal – third place	1980 Kyoto	Men's singles
Bronze medal – third place	1979 Tokyo	Men's doubles
Thomas Cup
Silver medal – second place	1973 Jakarta	Men's team
Silver medal – second place	1979 Jakarta	Men's team
Bronze medal – third place	1982 London	Men's team
European Championships
Gold medal – first place	1976 Dublin	Men's singles
Gold medal – first place	1978 Preston	Men's singles
Gold medal – first place	1980 Groningen	Men's singles
Gold medal – first place	1976 Dublin	Mixed team
Gold medal – first place	1978 Preston	Mixed team
Gold medal – first place	1980 Groningen	Mixed team
Silver medal – second place	1972 Karlskrona	Mixed team
Silver medal – second place	1974 Vienna	Mixed team
Bronze medal – third place	1972 Karlskrona	Men's singles
Bronze medal – third place	1974 Vienna	Men's singles
Bronze medal – third place	1974 Vienna	Men's doubles
Bronze medal – third place	1980 Groningen	Men's doubles
European Junior Championships
Gold medal – first place	1969 Voorburg	Boys' singles
Bronze medal – third place	1969 Voorburg	Boys' doubles

Flemming Delfs (born 7 September 1951) is a Danish badminton player who was world no. 1 in 1977. He won the All England Championship, the European and the World Championship in the 1970s.

== Career ==
Delfs is especially noteworthy for winning men's singles at the first IBF World Championships held in Malmö, Sweden in 1977. He dominated that same 1976/1977 season by winning nearly all other noteworthy tournaments, including the All-England Championships. Delfs won three consecutive European men's singles titles in 1976, 1978, and 1980. He played on all four Danish Thomas Cup (men's international) teams between 1972 and 1982, two of which (1973, 1979) reached the championship round before losing to Indonesia. Tall, with an elegant style and powerful backhand, Delfs was a highly impressive player at his best, but typically had difficulty in the hot, humid conditions he encountered in the Far East.

== Later life ==
After ending his active career, Delfs became CEO and co-owner of Patrick Skandinavia A/S the Danish distributor for Patrick.

== Achievements ==
=== World Championships ===
Men's singles
Year	Venue	Opponent	Score	Result
1977	Malmö Isstadion, Malmö, Sweden	(Denmark) Svend Pri	15–5, 15–6	Gold

Men's doubles
Year	Venue	Partner	Opponent	Score	Result
1980	Istora Senayan, Jakarta, Indonesia	(Denmark) Steen Skovgaard	(Indonesia) Rudy Heryanto (Indonesia) Kartono	7–15, 7–15	Bronze

=== World Cup ===
Men's singles
Year	Venue	Opponent	Score	Result
1979	Tokyo, Japan	(Indonesia) Iie Sumirat	7–15, 7–15	Bronze
1980	Kyoto, Japan	(Japan) Masao Tsuchida	10–15, 13–15	Bronze

Men's doubles
Year	Venue	Partner	Opponent	Score	Result
1979	Tokyo, Japan	(Denmark) Steen Skovgaard	(Japan) Masao Tsuchida (Japan) Yoshitaka Iino	13–15, 10–15	Bronze
1980	Kyoto, Japan	(Denmark) Steen Skovgaard	(Indonesia) Ade Chandra (Indonesia) Christian Hadinata	6–15, 3–15	Silver

=== European Championships ===
Men's singles
Year	Venue	Opponent	Score	Result
1972	Karlskrona Idrottshall, Karlskrona, Sweden	(Denmark) Klaus Kaagaard	13–18, 15–8, 7–15	Bronze
1974	Stadthalle, Vienna, Austria	(Sweden) Sture Johnsson	15–4, 6–15, 8–15	Bronze
1976	Fitzwilliam Club, Dublin, Ireland	(Denmark) Elo Hansen	15–4, 15–7	Gold
1978	Guild Hall, Preston, England	(Sweden) Thomas Kihlström	10–15, 15–6, 15–12	Gold
1980	Martinihal, Groningen, Netherlands	(Denmark) Morten Frost	15–4, 1–15, 17–14	Gold

Men's doubles
Year	Venue	Partner	Opponent	Score	Result
1974	Stadthalle, Vienna, Austria	(Denmark) Elo Hansen	(West Germany) Willi Braun (West Germany) Roland Maywald	8–15, 6–15	Bronze
1980	Martinihal, Groningen, Netherlands	(Denmark) Steen Skovgaard	(Sweden) Stefan Karlsson (Sweden) Claes Nordin	3–15, 13–18	Bronze

=== European Junior Championships ===
Boys' singles
Year	Venue	Opponent	Score	Result
1969	Sporthal de Vliegermolen, Leidschendam-Voorburg, Netherlands	(Denmark) Preben Boesen	15–0, 15–1	Gold

Boys' doubles
Year	Venue	Partner	Opponent	Score	Result
1969	Sporthal de Vliegermolen, Leidschendam-Voorburg, Netherlands	(Denmark) Hans Røpke	(England) Keith Arthur (England) Ray Stevens	15–9, 10–15, 10–15	Bronze

=== International tournaments (30 titles, 34 runners-up) ===
Men's singles
Year	Tournament	Opponent	Score	Result
1973	Denmark Open	(Indonesia) Rudy Hartono	14–17, 12–15	(silver) Runner-up
1973	India Open	(Denmark) Svend Pri	8–15, 7–15	(silver) Runner-up
1974	Portugal International	(Denmark) Elo Hansen	5–15, 9–15	(silver) Runner-up
1974	Nordic Championships	(Denmark) Svend Pri	15–9, 10–15, 5–15	(silver) Runner-up
1975	Dutch Open	(Sweden) Sture Johnsson	14–15, 15–0, 15–10	(gold) Winner
1975	German Open	(England) Paul Whetnall	15–10, 15–12	(gold) Winner
1975	Jamaica International	(Canada) Jamie Paulson	15–6, 15–2	(gold) Winner
1975	Nordic Championships	(Sweden) Sture Johnsson	6–15, 15–12, 3–15	(silver) Runner-up
1975	Norwegian International	(Sweden) Sture Johnsson	15–1, 15–5	(gold) Winner
1976	Denmark Open	(Denmark) Svend Pri	15–9, 5–15, 10–15	(silver) Runner-up
1976	Dutch Open	(England) Ray Stevens	15–10, 15–1	(gold) Winner
1976	German Open	(England) Paul Whetnall	14–17, 10–15	(silver) Runner-up
1976	Nordic Championships	(Denmark) Svend Pri	15–4, 15–0	(gold) Winner
1976	Norwegian International	(Sweden) Sture Johnsson	4–15, 15–1, 7–15	(silver) Runner-up
1977	Swedish Open	(Indonesia) Liem Swie King	4–15, 8–15	(silver) Runner-up
1977	Canadian Open	(Sweden) Thomas Kihlström	12–15, 15–7, 15–10	(gold) Winner
1977	All England	(Indonesia) Liem Swie King	15–17, 15–11, 15–8	(gold) Winner
1977	Denmark Open	(Denmark) Svend Pri	15–12, 15–7	(gold) Winner
1977	Japan Open	(Sweden) Thomas Kihlström	15–9, 13–15, 10–15	(silver) Runner-up
1978	Swedish Open	(Denmark) Svend Pri	3–15, 8–15	(silver) Runner-up
1978	Dutch Open	(Denmark) Svend Pri	15–3, 3–15, 15–7	(gold) Winner
1978	Canadian Open	(Sweden) Thomas Kihlström	14–17, 15–11, 18–16	(gold) Winner
1978	Nordic Championships	(Denmark) Morten Frost	15–5, 6–15, 4–15	(silver) Runner-up
1979	Swedish Open	(England) Ray Stevens	15–7, 15–0	(gold) Winner
1979	Dutch Open	(Denmark) Morten Frost	15–6, 3–15, 17–15	(gold) Winner
1979	Denmark Open	(Denmark) Morten Frost	15–7, 15–7	(gold) Winner
1979	All England	(Indonesia) Liem Swie King	7–15, 8–15	(silver) Runner-up
1979	Canadian Open	(Denmark) Morten Frost	7–15, 17–14, 7–15	(silver) Runner-up
1979	Nordic Championships	(Denmark) Morten Frost	6–15, 4–15	(silver) Runner-up
1980	Chinese Taipei Open	(Indonesia) Iie Sumirat	15–7, 8–15, 18–16	(gold) Winner
1980	Victor Cup	(Sweden) Thomas Kihlström	7–15, 10–15	(silver) Runner-up
1981	Nordic Championships	(Denmark) Morten Frost	17–18, 5–15	(silver) Runner-up
1982	Scottish Open	(Denmark) Morten Frost	4–15, 2–15	(silver) Runner-up

Men's doubles
Year	Tournament	Partner	Opponent	Score	Result
1970	Nordic Championships	(Denmark) Jørgen Mortensen	(Denmark) Svend Pri (Denmark) Per Walsøe	8–15, 8–15	(silver) Runner-up
1973	Nordic Championships	(Denmark) Elo Hansen	(Denmark) Svend Pri (Denmark) Poul Petersen	16–18, 17–16, 15–10	(gold) Winner
1974	Portugal International	(Denmark) Elo Hansen	(England) David Hunt (England) William Kidd	12–15, 15–8, 10–15	(silver) Runner-up
1974	Nordic Championships	(Denmark) Elo Hansen	(Denmark) Svend Pri (Denmark) Poul Petersen	10–15, 6–15	(silver) Runner-up
1975	Jamaica International	(Denmark) Elo Hansen	(England) Mike Tredgett (England) Ray Stevens	15–13, 4–15, 11–15	(silver) Runner-up
1975	Mexico International	(Denmark) Elo Hansen	(Sweden) Sture Johnsson (Sweden) Thomas Kihlström	11–15, 15–13, 15–5	(gold) Winner
1975	Nordic Championships	(Denmark) Elo Hansen	(Sweden) Bengt Fröman (Sweden) Thomas Kihlström	9–15, 2–15	(silver) Runner-up
1975	Norwegian International	(Denmark) Elo Hansen	(Sweden) Bengt Fröman (Sweden) Thomas Kihlström	5–15, 15–5, 18–17	(gold) Winner
1976	Swedish Open	(Denmark) Elo Hansen	(Denmark) Jesper Helledie (Denmark) Jørgen Mortensen	15–0, 15–2	(gold) Winner
1976	Dutch Open	(Denmark) Elo Hansen	(Denmark) Klaus Kaagaard (Denmark) Steen Skovgaard	15–6, 15–12	(gold) Winner
1976	Denmark Open	(Denmark) Elo Hansen	(England) David Eddy (England) Eddy Sutton	13–15, 11–15	(silver) Runner-up
1976	Norwegian International	(Denmark) Elo Hansen	(Sweden) Bengt Fröman (Sweden) Thomas Kihlström	6–15, 12–15	(silver) Runner-up
1977	Japan Open	(Denmark) Steen Skovgaard	(Japan) Nobutaka Ikeda (Japan) Shoichi Toganoo	15–9, 15–2	(gold) Winner
1977	Denmark Open	(Denmark) Steen Skovgaard	(Sweden) Bengt Fröman (Sweden) Thomas Kihlström	6–15, 8–15	(silver) Runner-up
1977	Nordic Championships	(Denmark) Steen Skovgaard	(Sweden) Bengt Fröman (Sweden) Thomas Kihlström	15–4, 12–15, 12–15	(silver) Runner-up
1978	Denmark Open	(Denmark) Steen Skovgaard	(Indonesia) Ade Chandra (Indonesia) Christian Hadinata	15–6, 15–11	(gold) Winner
1978	Canadian Open	(Denmark) Steen Skovgaard	(Sweden) Bengt Fröman (Sweden) Thomas Kihlström	15–9, 10–15, retired	(silver) Runner-up
1978	Swedish Open	(Denmark) Steen Skovgaard	(Sweden) Bengt Fröman (Sweden) Thomas Kihlström	15–18, 15–9, 15–8	(gold) Winner
1978	Nordic Championships	(Denmark) Steen Skovgaard	(Sweden) Bengt Fröman (Sweden) Thomas Kihlström	15–5, 15–9	(gold) Winner
1979	Canadian Open	(Denmark) Morten Frost	(Indonesia) Ade Chandra (Indonesia) Christian Hadinata	5–15, 1–15	(silver) Runner-up
1979	Swedish Open	(Denmark) Steen Skovgaard	(Denmark) Steen Fladberg (Denmark) Morten Frost	15–12, 12–15, 15–10	(gold) Winner
1979	Nordic Championships	(Denmark) Steen Skovgaard	(Sweden) Bengt Fröman (Sweden) Thomas Kihlström	15–13, 11–15, 14–17	(silver) Runner-up
1980	Copenhagen Cup	(Denmark) Steen Skovgaard	(Denmark) Steen Fladberg (Denmark) Morten Frost	15–8, 15–6	(gold) Winner
1980	Denmark Open	(Denmark) Steen Skovgaard	(Indonesia) Ade Chandra (Indonesia) Christian Hadinata	15–10, 10–15, 15–10	(gold) Winner
1980	Chinese Taipei Open	(Denmark) Steen Skovgaard	(Indonesia) Bobby Ertanto (Indonesia) Hadibowo	13–18, 5–15	(silver) Runner-up
1980	Victor Cup	(Denmark) Steen Skovgaard	(Sweden) Thomas Kihlström (Sweden) Claes Nordin	5–15, 17–18	(silver) Runner-up
1981	Japan Open	(India) Prakash Padukone	(Indonesia) Christian Hadinata (Indonesia) Lius Pongoh	4–15, 5–15	(silver) Runner-up
1981	Nordic Championships	(Denmark) Steen Skovgaard	(Denmark) Steen Fladberg (Denmark) Morten Frost	9–15, 5–15	(silver) Runner-up

Mixed doubles
Year	Tournament	Partner	Opponent	Score	Result
1972	Canadian Open	(Denmark) Pernille Kaagaard	(England) Elliot Stuart (Sweden) Eva Twedberg	15–11, 18–17	(gold) Winner
1972	U.S. Open	(Denmark) Pernille Kaagaard	(England) Elliot Stuart (Sweden) Eva Twedberg	15–5, 15–1	(gold) Winner
1973	Mexico International	(United States) Carlene Starkey	(Canada) G. Harris (United States) Madalene Steinbroner	15–12, 15–1	(gold) Winner
