= Kenneth Parsons =

American economist

Kenneth Herald Parsons (1903–1998) was a professor of agricultural economics at the University of Wisconsin–Madison.

He joined the faculty in 1937, received his Ph.D. in 1940, and retired in 1974 after a distinguished career of teaching and research. From 1931 to 1936, he worked in Washington DC with the Federal Farm Board, the Farm Credit Administration and the U.S. Department of Agriculture. From 1940 to 1970, Parsons worked with the United Nations Food and Agriculture Organization, the Marshall Plan, the Ford Foundation, and the U.S. Agency for International Development conducting research in Europe, Asia, Africa and Latin America, with a special focus on land tenure and land reform and their economic implementations. As a UW–Madison student in 1929, Parsons was attracted by the ideas of institutional economist John R. Commons, and edited Commons' The Economics of Collective Action published in 1950 by Macmillan after Commons died in 1945. Parsons wrote "The John R. Commons' Point of View", Journal of Land & Public Utility Economics, 1942.

== Achievements ==
Parsons was one of the first U.S. agricultural economists with a professional concern and commitment to the study of economic development. He was chief economist of the Agricultural Section of the Marshall Plan in 1949–50. Parsons helped organize the World Land Tenure Conference at Madison, October, 1951. Together with Raymond Penn and Philip Raup, he edited the proceedings published as Land Tenure and Related Problems in World Agriculture, University of Wisconsin Press, 1956. He helped establish the Land Tenure Center at the University of Wisconsin in 1962 to undertake research in Latin American on land tenure and related issues in relation to agricultural development. From 1968 to 1971, Parsons was head of the Agricultural Economics Department, University of Ife, Nigeria. Parsons' responsibility was to build a department of agricultural economics, train students, and teach courses and seminars.

He was a fellow of the American Agricultural Economic Association and was awarded the Veblen-Commons Award in 1985 by the Association for Evolutionary Economics.

== Publications ==
- Parsons, K. H. (1941). "Social Conflicts and Agricultural Programs". Journal of Farm Economics. 23 (4): 743–764. doi:10.2307/1231674. JSTOR 1231674.
- Parsons, K. H.; Commons, J. R. (1942). "John R. Commons' Point of View". The Journal of Land & Public Utility Economics. 18 (3): 245–266. doi:10.2307/3159056. JSTOR 3159056.
- Parson, K. H.; Waples, E. (1945). "Keeping the Farm in the Family". Research Bulletin of the University of Wisconsin–Madison. 157.
- Parsons, K. H. (1949). "The Logical Foundations of Economic Research". Journal of Farm Economics. 31 (4): 656–686. doi:10.2307/1232709. JSTOR 1232709.
- Parsons, K. H. (1957). "U.S. Training for Foreign Students in Agricultural Economics". Journal of Farm Economics. 39 (2): 235–249. doi:10.2307/1234140. JSTOR 1234140.
- Parsons, K. H. (1957). "Land Reform in the Postwar Era". Land Economics. 33 (3): 213–227. Bibcode:1957LandE..33..213P. doi:10.2307/3144530. JSTOR 3144530.
- Parsons, K. H. (1959). "Land Reform in the United Arab Republic". Land Economics. 35 (4): 319–326. Bibcode:1959LandE..35..319P. doi:10.2307/3144597. JSTOR 3144597.
- Parsons, K. H. (1966). "Institutional Aspects of Agricultural Development Policy". Journal of Farm Economics. 48 (5): 1185–1194. doi:10.2307/1237118. JSTOR 1237118.
- Parsons, K. H. (1974). "The Institutional Basis of an Agricultural Market Economy". Journal of Economic Issues. 8 (4): 737–757. doi:10.1080/00213624.1974.11503226. JSTOR 4224357.
- Parsons, K. H. (1985). "John R. Commons: His Relevance to Contemporary Economics". Journal of Economic Issues. 19 (3): 755–778. doi:10.1080/00213624.1985.11504414. JSTOR 4225619.
