= Gordon Hamilton (badminton) =

Scottish international badminton player

Personal information
- Nationality: British (Scottish)
- Born: c.1955

Sport
- Sport: Badminton
- Club: Edinburgh
Medal record
Representing Scotland
Scottish Nationals
Gold medal – first place	1979	doubles
Irish Open
Gold medal – first place	1980	doubles

Gordon Hamilton (born c.1955) is a former international badminton player from Scotland who competed at the Commonwealth Games.

== Biography ==
Hamilton was based in Edinburgh and represented Scotland at international level.

In 1981 Hamilton won the West of Scotland title and reached the ranking of number 2 in Scotland.

Hamilton represented the Scottish team at the 1982 Commonwealth Games in Brisbane, Australia, where he competed in the badminton events.

He was the twice a champion at the Scottish National Badminton Championships in the men's doubles in 1979 and the mixed doubles in 1988.

Additionally, he was the 1980 doubles champion at the Irish Open.
