= Claes Nordin =

Swedish badminton player (born 1955)

Personal information
- Born: 20 July 1955 (age 71)

Sport
- Country: Sweden
- Sport: Badminton
Medal record
Men's badminton
Representing Sweden
European Championships
Gold medal – first place	1980 Groningen	Men's doubles
Bronze medal – third place	1978 Preston	Men's doubles
Bronze medal – third place	1982 Böblingen	Men's doubles
European Mixed Team Championships
Silver medal – second place	1982 Böblingen	Mixed team
Bronze medal – third place	1978 Preston	Mixed team
Bronze medal – third place	1980 Groningen	Mixed team
European Junior Championships
Bronze medal – third place	1973 Edinburgh	Boys' doubles

Claes Nordin (born 20 July 1955) is a badminton player from Sweden.

== Career ==
Nordin won the gold medal at the 1980 European Badminton Championships in men's doubles with Stefan Karlsson.

== Achievements ==
=== International tournaments ===
Men's doubles
Year	Tournament	Partner	Opponent	Score	Result
1980	Victor Cup	(Sweden) Thomas Kihlström	(Denmark) Flemming Delfs (Denmark) Steen Skovgaard	15–5, 18–17	(gold) Winner
