= 1977 IBF World Championships – Mixed doubles =

Mixed doubles at the 1977 IBF World Championships
- Venue: Malmö Isstadion
- Location: Malmö, Sweden
- Dates: May 3, 1977 – May 8, 1977

Medalists
| gold medal | Steen Skovgaard; Lene Køppen | Denmark |
| silver medal | Derek Talbot; Gillian Gilks | England |
| bronze medal | Mike Tredgett; Nora Perry | England |
| bronze medal | Billy Gilliland; Joanna Flockhart | Scotland |

The First IBF World Championships took place 1977 in Malmö, Sweden. Following the results of the women's doubles. (Note: Results of the first rounds incomplete.)

== Main stage ==
=== Section 1 ===
First round
(Canada) Lucio Fabris (Canada) Wendy Clarkson | 15 | 15
(Socialist Federal Republic of Yugoslavia) Gregor Berden (Socialist Federal Republic of Yugoslavia) Marta Amf | 7 | 4

Second round
(Denmark) Steen Skovgaard (Denmark) Lene Køppen | 15 | 15
(Sweden) Christian Lundberg (Sweden) Agneta Lundh | 9 | 5
(Zambia) Julien Dawes (Zambia) S. Dawes
(Germany) Wolfgang Bochow (Germany) Karin Kucki | w | / | o
(Canada) Lucio Fabris (Canada) Wendy Clarkson | 15 | 15
(Taiwan) Liao Kun-fu (Taiwan) Lin Su | 8 | 10
(Portugal) Manuel Joás (Portugal) Isabel Rocha | 3 | 2
(England) Eddy Sutton (England) Jane Webster | 15 | 15

Third round
(Denmark) Steen Skovgaard (Denmark) Lene Køppen | 17 | 15
(Germany) Wolfgang Bochow (Germany) Karin Kucki | 15 | 5
(Canada) Lucio Fabris (Canada) Wendy Clarkson | 18 | 15
(England) Eddy Sutton (England) Jane Webster | 14 | 8

Quarterfinals
(Denmark) Steen Skovgaard (Denmark) Lene Køppen | 15 | 15
(Canada) Lucio Fabris (Canada) Wendy Clarkson | 8 | 6

=== Section 2 ===
First round

Second round
(England) Mike Tredgett (England) Nora Perry | 15 | 17
(Sweden) Claes Nordin (Sweden) Eva Stuart | 8 | 14
(Scotland) Gordon Hamilton (Scotland) Christine Stewart | w | / | o
(Zambia) Malcolm Abraham (Zambia) Teresa Koloko
(Denmark) Elo Hansen (Netherlands) Joke van Beusekom | 18 | 15
(Japan) Shoichi Toganoo (Japan) Etsuko Toganoo | 15 | 11
(Sweden) Lasse Nybergh (Sweden) Viola Renholm | 6 | 4
(Canada) Ian Johnson (Canada) Lesley Harris | 15 | 15

Third round
(England) Mike Tredgett (England) Nora Perry | 15 | 15
(Scotland) Gordon Hamilton (Scotland) Christine Stewart | 6 | 4
(Denmark) Elo Hansen (Netherlands) Joke van Beusekom | 15 | 15
(Canada) Ian Johnson (Canada) Lesley Harris | 8 | 7

Quarterfinals
(England) Mike Tredgett (England) Nora Perry | 15 | 15
(Denmark) Elo Hansen (Netherlands) Joke van Beusekom | 7 | 9

=== Section 3 ===
First round

Second round
(West Germany) Roland Maywald (West Germany) Brigitte Steden | 4 | 15 | 15
(Sweden) Mats Olsson (Sweden) Britt-Marie Larsson | 15 | 10 | 9
(Norway) Petter Thoresen (Norway) Else Thoresen | 14 | 6
(Taiwan) Jih Shyh-ching (Taiwan) Chen Yu-jen | 18 | 15
(Denmark) Gert Hansen (Denmark) Inge Borgstrøm | w | / | o
(Zambia) Vishav Kapil (Zambia) Christine Nyahoda
(Canada) Kevin Little (Canada) Sherri Boyse | 8 | 2
(England) Derek Talbot (England) Gillian Gilks | 15 | 15

Third round
(West Germany) Roland Maywald (West Germany) Brigitte Steden | 15 | 15
(Taiwan) Jih Shyh-ching (Taiwan) Chen Yu-jen | 7 | 14
(Denmark) Gert Hansen (Denmark) Inge Borgstrøm | 4 | 5
(England) Derek Talbot (England) Gillian Gilks | 15 | 15

Quarterfinals
(West Germany) Roland Maywald (West Germany) Brigitte Steden | 14 | 9
(England) Derek Talbot (England) Gillian Gilks | 18 | 15

=== Section 4 ===
First round

Second round
(England) David Eddy (England) Barbara Giles | w | / | o
(Canada) Jamie McKee (Canada) Jane Youngberg
(Sweden) Lars Wengberg (Sweden) Anette Börjesson | 15 | 7 | 12
(Japan) Nobutaka Ikeda (Japan) Mikiko Takada | 6 | 15 | 15
(Denmark) Bo Kjærgaard Nielsen (Denmark) Susanne Mølgaard Hansen | 13 | 10
(Netherlands) Rob Ridder (Netherlands) Marjan Ridder | 15 | 15
(Australia) Peter Cooper (Australia) Susan Daly | 7 | 6
(Scotland) Billy Gilliland (Scotland) Joanne Flockhart | 15 | 15

Third round
(England) David Eddy (England) Barbara Giles | 15 | 15
(Japan) Nobutaka Ikeda (Japan) Mikiko Takada | 11 | 7
(Netherlands) Rob Ridder (Netherlands) Marjan Ridder | 12 | 15 | 8
(Scotland) Billy Gilliland (Scotland) Joanne Flockhart | 15 | 6 | 15

Quarterfinals
(England) David Eddy (England) Barbara Giles | 15 | 15 | 12
(Scotland) Billy Gilliland (Scotland) Joanne Flockhart | 18 | 4 | 15

== Final stage ==
Quarterfinals
(Denmark) Steen Skovgaard (Denmark) Lene Køppen | 15 | 15
(Canada) Lucio Fabris (Canada) Wendy Clarkson | 8 | 6
(England) Mike Tredgett (England) Nora Perry | 15 | 15
(Denmark) Elo Hansen (Netherlands) Joke van Beusekom | 7 | 9
(West Germany) Roland Maywald (West Germany) Brigitte Steden | 14 | 9
(England) Derek Talbot (England) Gillian Gilks | 18 | 15
(England) David Eddy (England) Barbara Giles | 15 | 15 | 12
(Scotland) Billy Gilliland (Scotland) Joanne Flockhart | 18 | 4 | 15

Semifinals
(Denmark) Steen Skovgaard (Denmark) Lene Køppen | 17 | 15
(England) Mike Tredgett (England) Nora Perry | 15 | 10
(England) Derek Talbot (England) Gillian Gilks | 18 | 15
(Scotland) Billy Gilliland (Scotland) Joanne Flockhart | 17 | 6

Finals
(Denmark) Steen Skovgaard (Denmark) Lene Køppen | 15 | 18
(England) Derek Talbot (England) Gillian Gilks | 12 | 17
