= 1977 IBF World Championships – Women's singles =

Badminton championships

Women's singles at the 1977 IBF World Championships
- Venue: Malmö Isstadion
- Location: Malmö, Sweden
- Dates: May 3, 1977 – May 8, 1977

Medalists
gold medal	Lene Køppen	Denmark
silver medal	Gillian Gilks	England
bronze medal	Hiroe Yuki	Japan
bronze medal	Margaret Lockwood	England

The 1. IBF World Championships took place 1977 in Malmö, Sweden. Following the results of the women's singles. (Note: Results of the first rounds incomplete.)

== Main stage ==
=== Section 1 ===
First round
(Japan) Saori Kondō
(Sweden) Cecilia Jeppson
(Denmark) Lene Køppen
(Indonesia) Taty Sumirah
(England) Jane Webster
(Republic of Ireland) Barbara Beckett

Second round
(Japan) Saori Kondō	bye
(Sweden) Cecilia Jeppson	bye
(Denmark) Lene Køppen	w.o.
(Indonesia) Taty Sumirah
(England) Jane Webster	5	11	11
(Republic of Ireland) Barbara Beckett	11	5	2

Third round
(Japan) Saori Kondō	11	11
(Sweden) Cecilia Jeppson	1	3
(Denmark) Lene Køppen	11	11
' (England) Jane Webster	5	5

Quarterfinals
(Japan) Saori Kondō	12	5	3
(Denmark) Lene Køppen	10	11	11

=== Section 2 ===
First round
(England) Margaret Lockwood
(Germany) Eva-Maria Kranz
(Canada) Jane Youngberg
(Japan) Atsuko Tokuda
(Netherlands) Marjan Ridder	11	11
(Sweden) Anette Börjesson	8	4
(Indonesia) Sri Wiyanti	7	12	11
(Denmark) Lonny Bostofte	11	10	2
(Socialist Federal Republic of Yugoslavia) Marica Amf	11	11
(Portugal) Marta Margarida	1	0

Second round
(England) Margaret Lockwood	11	5	11
(Germany) Eva-Maria Kranz	8	11	2
(Canada) Jane Youngberg	bye
(Japan) Atsuko Tokuda	7	11	11
(Netherlands) Marjan Ridder	11	6	0
(Indonesia) Sri Wiyanti	11	11
(Socialist Federal Republic of Yugoslavia) Marica Amf	7	2

Third round
(England) Margaret Lockwood	11	11
(Canada) Jane Youngberg	4	5
(Japan) Atsuko Tokuda	11	11
(Indonesia) Sri Wiyanti	1	2

Quarterfinals
(England) Margaret Lockwood	11	11
(Japan) Atsuko Tokuda	6	1

=== Section 3 ===
First round
(Canada) Wendy Clarkson
(Australia) Susan Daly
(Denmark) Inge Borgström
(Japan) Hiroe Yuki
(England) Paula Kilvington
(Germany) Brigitte Steden
(Indonesia) Theresia Widiastuti

Second round
(Canada) Wendy Clarkson	11	11
(Australia) Susan Daly	2	9
(Denmark) Inge Borgström	bye
(Japan) Hiroe Yuki	11	11
(England) Paula Kilvington	5	1
(Germany) Brigitte Steden	11	11
(Indonesia) Theresia Widiastuti	2	2

Third round
(Canada) Wendy Clarkson	8	11	12
(Denmark) Inge Borgström	11	5	9
(Japan) Hiroe Yuki	7	11	11
(Germany) Brigitte Steden	11	2	3

Quarterfinals
(Canada) Wendy Clarkson	5	9
(Japan) Hiroe Yuki	11	12

=== Section 4 ===
First round
(Japan) Emiko Ueno	11	11
(Sweden) Eva Stuart	5	7
(Chinese Taipei) Soo Lin	11	11
(Canada) Lesley Harris	4	2
(Netherlands) Joke van Beusekom
(Denmark) Pia Nielsen	11	11
(Zambia) Teresa Koloko	0	2
(England) Gillian Gilks
(Scotland) Joanna Flockhart
(Germany) Vera Winter

Second round
(Japan) Emiko Ueno	11	11
(Chinese Taipei) Soo Lin	3	4
(Netherlands) Joke van Beusekom	5	11	11
(Denmark) Pia Nielsen	11	4	7
(England) Gillian Gilks	11	11
(Scotland) Joanna Flockhart	2	4
(Germany) Vera Winter	11	11
(Norway) Else Thoresen	5	5

Third round
(Japan) Emiko Ueno	11	11
(Netherlands) Joke van Beusekom	7	8
(England) Gillian Gilks	11	11
(Germany) Vera Winter	4	6

Quarterfinals
(Japan) Emiko Ueno	2	7
(England) Gillian Gilks	11	11

== Final stage ==
Quarterfinals
1	(Japan) Saori Kondō	12	5	3
8	(Denmark) Lene Køppen	10	11	11
4	(England) Margaret Lockwood	11	11
5	(Japan) Atsuko Tokuda	6	1
3	(Canada) Wendy Clarkson	5	9
6	(Japan) Hiroe Yuki	11	12
2	(Japan) Emiko Ueno	2	7
7	(England) Gillian Gilks	11	11

Semifinals
(Denmark) Lene Køppen	11	11
(England) Margaret Lockwood	6	1
(Japan) Hiroe Yuki	4	7
(England) Gillian Gilks	11	11

Finals
(Denmark) Lene Køppen	12	12
(England) Gillian Gilks	9	11
