= 1976 All England Open Badminton Championships =

1976 All England Championships
Tournament details
- Dates: 24 March 1976– 27 March 1976
- Edition: 66th
- Venue: Wembley Arena
- Location: London

The 1976 All England Championships was a badminton tournament held at Wembley Arena, London, England, from 24–27 March 1976.

== Final results ==
Category	Winners	Runners-up	Score
Men's singles	(Indonesia) Rudy Hartono	(Indonesia) Liem Swie King	15–7, 15-7
Women's singles	(England) Gillian Gilks	(England) Margaret Lockwood	11–0, 11-3
Men's doubles	(Sweden) Bengt Fröman & Thomas Kihlstrom	(Denmark) Svend Pri & Steen Skovgaard	15-12, 17-15
Women's doubles	(England) Gillian Gilks & Susan Whetnall	(England) Margaret Lockwood & Nora Gardner	15–10, 15-10
Mixed doubles	(England) Derek Talbot & Gillian Gilks	(England) Mike Tredgett & Nora Gardner	15-9, 15-12

== Men's singles ==
=== Section 1 ===
Round of 32
(Indonesia) Rudy Hartono	15	15
(Sweden) Kurt Johnsson	5	3
(England) David Hunt	6	15	15
(Netherlands) Piet Ridder	15	3	1
(England) Paul Whetnall	15	15
(Denmark) Elo Hansen	8	13
(Sweden) Bruno Wackfelt	15	6	15
(Sweden) Willy Nilsson	5	15	8
(Denmark) Flemming Delfs	17	15
(Sweden) Stefan Karlsson	15	8
(England) Derek Talbot	15	15
(England) Kevin Jolly	6	8
(Sweden) Thomas Kihlström	15	15
(England) Brian Wallwork	9	6
(Denmark) Morten Frost	15	15
(England) Brian White	4	8

Round of 16
(Indonesia) Hartono	15	15
(England) Hunt	5	4
(England) Whetnall	15	15
(Sweden) Wackfelt	11	4
(Denmark) Delfs	15	17
(England) Talbot	12	16
(Sweden) Kihlström	15	15
(Denmark) Frost	6	10

Quarter-finals
(Indonesia) Hartono	15	15
(England) Whetnall	5	5
(Denmark) Delfs	15	3	15
(Sweden) Kihlström	9	15	6

Semi-finals
1	(Indonesia) Hartono	15	7	18
(Denmark) Delfs	10	15	15

=== Section 2 ===
Round of 32
(Indonesia) Liem Swie King	15	15
(Denmark) Henrik Fahrenholz	2	0
(England) Mike Wilks	15	17
(West Germany) Michael Schnaase	9	16
(Denmark) Svend Pri	15	15
(Sweden) Lars Wengberg	4	6
(Denmark) Franz Harboe	15	8	15
(England) William Kidd	12	15	9
(West Germany) Wolfgang Bochow	15	15
(England) Ray Stevens	10	3
(Indonesia) Amril Nuhrman	15	15
(Mexico) Victor Jaramillo Luque	0	4
(Denmark) Jesper Helledie	15	15
(Netherlands) Rob Ridder	10	5
(South Africa) Gordon McMillan	5	10
2	(Sweden) Sture Johnsson	15	15

Round of 16
(Indonesia) Swie King	15	15
(England) Wilks	2	0
(Denmark) Pri	15	15
(Denmark) Harboe	4	2
(West Germany) Bochow	2	8
(Indonesia) Nuhrman	15	15
(Denmark) Helledie	6	8
(Sweden) Johnsson	15	15

Quarter-finals
(Indonesia) Swie King	18	15
(Denmark) Pri	17	2
(Indonesia) Nuhrman	5	5
(Sweden) Johnsson	15	15

Semi-finals
(Indonesia) Swie King	15	15
(Sweden) Johnsson	10	2

== Women's singles ==
Margaret Beck married and competed under the new name of Margaret Lockwood.

=== Section 1 ===
Round of 32
(England) Gillian Gilks	11	11
(West Germany) Marieluise Zizmann	2	3
(Denmark) Pia Nielsen	11	11
(England) D J Kirby	6	2
(Netherlands) Joke van Beusekom	11	11
(Republic of Ireland) Barbara Beckett	3	5
(England) Karen Bridge	10	11	11
(South Africa) Marianne Van Der Walt	12	5	5
(Denmark) Lene Køppen	11	11
(England) Karen Puttick	0	1
(Sweden) Eva Stuart	11	11
(England) S Roberts	4	3
(Canada) Jane Youngberg	11	11
(South Africa) Barbara Lord	2	1
(Indonesia) Theresa Widiastuti	11	11
(England) Paula Kilvington	6	6

Round of 16
(England) Gilks	11	11
(Denmark) Nielsen P	2	2
(Netherlands) van Beusekom	11	11
(England) Bridge	7	1
(Denmark) Køppen	11	11
(Sweden) Stuart	4	3
(Canada) Youngberg	11	11
(Indonesia) Widiastuti	4	8

Quarter-finals
(England) Gilks	7	11	11
(Netherlands) van Beusekom	11	0	8
(Denmark) Køppen	11	11
(Canada) Youngberg	1	5

Semi-finals
(England) Gilks	11	12
(Denmark) Køppen	0	10

=== Section 2 ===
Round of 32
(England) Margaret Lockwood	11	11
(Denmark) Marianne Christensen	5	8
(Sweden) Anette Börjesson	11	11
(England) Kathleen Redhead	3	8
(Canada) Wendy Clarkson	12	11
(Denmark) Mette Myhre	10	7
(England) Heather Nielsen	9	11	12
(West Germany) Eva Maria Kranz	11	4	10
(Indonesia) Taty Sumirah	11	11
(South Africa) Gussie Botes	1	4
(England) Sue Whetnall	11	12
(Denmark) Liselotte Gottsche	3	9
(England) Jane Webster	10	11	11
(Denmark) Inge Borgstrøm	12	5	6
(West Germany) Irmgard Gerlatzka	11	12
(Netherlands) Marjan Luesken	4	9

Round of 16
(England) Lockwood	11	10	11
(Sweden) Börjesson	8	12	6
(Canada) Clarkson	11	11
(England) Nielsen H	6	5
(Indonesia) Sumirah	11	8	11
(England) Whetnall	6	11	3
(England) Webster	11	8	11
(West Germany) Gerlatzka	2	11	6

Quarter-finals
(England) Lockwood	11	11
(Canada) Clarkson	1	1
(Indonesia) Sumirah	12	2	11
(England) Webster	10	11	0

Semi-finals
(England) Lockwood	11	11
(Indonesia) Sumirah	1	0
