= 1974 All England Badminton Championships =

1974 All England Championships
Tournament details
- Dates: 20 March 1974– 23 March 1974
- Edition: 64th
- Venue: Wembley Arena
- Location: London

The 1974 All England Championships was a badminton tournament held at Wembley Arena, London, England, from 20–23 March 1974.

== Final results ==
Category	Winners	Runners-up	Score
Men's singles	(Indonesia) Rudy Hartono	(Malaysia) Punch Gunalan	8-15, 15-9, 15-10
Women's singles	(Japan) Hiroe Yuki	(England) Gillian Gilks	11-6, 12-11
Men's doubles	(Indonesia) Johan Wahjudi & Tjun Tjun	(Indonesia) Ade Chandra & Christian Hadinata	15-8, 15-6
Women's doubles	(England) Margaret Beck & Gillian Gilks	(England) Margaret Boxall & Susan Whetnall	15-5, 18-14
Mixed doubles	(England) David Eddy & Susan Whetnall	(England) Derek Talbot & Gillian Gilks	15-5, 7-15, 15-10

== Men's singles ==
=== Section 1 ===
Round of 32
=1	(Indonesia) Rudy Hartono	15	15
(England) Ray Stevens	7	7
(Sweden) Thomas Kihlström	15	15
(Denmark) Bendt Rose	9	6
(Denmark) Elo Hansen	15	15
(Denmark) Jorgen Mortensen	7	5
(England) David Hunt	15	15
(Pakistan) Javed Iqbal	2	9
(Sweden) Sture Johnsson	15	15
(Japan) Shoichi Toganoo	1	1
(Denmark) Flemming Delfs	15	15
(Scotland) Nicol McCloy	5	3
(Indonesia) Christian Hadinata	15	15
(Denmark) Henrik Fahrenholz	0	8
(Denmark) Niels Norgaard	15	7	15
(England) D H White	12	15	12

Round of 16
=1	(Indonesia) Hartono	15	15
(Sweden) Kihlstrom	10	3
(Denmark) Hansen	15	15
(England) Hunt	5	8
(Sweden) Johnsson	15	17	15
(Denmark) Delfs	7	18	9
(Indonesia) Christian	15	15
(Denmark) Norgaard	8	8

Quarter-finals
=1	(Indonesia) Hartono	15	13	15
(Denmark) Hansen	11	15	3
(Sweden) Johnsson	15	15
(Indonesia) Christian	4	10

Semi-finals
=1	(Indonesia) Hartono	11	18	15
(Sweden) Johnsson	15	16	6

=== Section 2 ===
Round of 32
(Malaysia) Punch Gunalan	w/o
(Malaysia) James Selvaraj
(Netherlands) Rob Ridder	15	7	15
(Denmark) Bjarne Caspersen	5	15	5
(Indonesia) Tjun Tjun	15	15
(England) Paul Whetnall	5	0
(Malaysia) Cheah Hong Chong	15	15
(Scotland) Bob McCoig	10	10
(Denmark) Svend Andersen Pri	15	15
(Malaysia) Phua Ah Hwa	6	11
(England) Derek Talbot	15	15
(Pakistan) Hassan Shaheed	12	7
(Indonesia) Liem Swie King	15	15
(Norway) Knut Engebretsen	2	5
(Denmark) Jesper Helledie	15	6	17
(Denmark) Bo Kjaergaard-Nielsen	9	15	15

Round of 16
(Malaysia) Gunalan	15	15
(Netherlands) Ridder	3	6
(Indonesia) Tjun Tjun	15	15
(Malaysia) Chong	2	2
(Denmark) Pri	15	15
(England) Talbot	1	1
(Indonesia) Swie King	15	15
(Denmark) Helledie	2	14

Quarter-finals
(Malaysia) Gunalan	18	2	15
(Indonesia) Tjun Tjun	16	15	0
(Denmark) Pri	15	15
(Indonesia) Swie King	5	5

Semi-finals
(Malaysia) Gunalan	15	15
(Denmark) Pri	9	10

Eva Twedberg remarried and played under the name Eva Stuart and Marieluise Wackerow married and became Marieluise Zizmann.

== Women's singles ==
=== Section 1 ===
Round of 32
(Japan) Hiroe Yuki	11	11
(England) Sue Whetnall	6	6
(Denmark) Mette Myhre	11	4	11
(Netherlands) Agnes Van der Meulen	4	11	5
(England) Margaret Beck	11	11
(Denmark) Helle Guldborg-Hansen	0	1
(West Germany) Marieluise Zizmann	11	11
(Republic of Ireland) H J Young	3	5
(Netherlands) Joke van Beusekom	11	12
(Norway) Kari Histol	2	10
(England) Nora Gardner	11	11	11
(West Germany) Brigitte Steden	12	6	3
(Sweden) Eva Stuart	11	11
(Canada) Sandra Stevenson	2	1
(Republic of Ireland) Barbara Beckett	5	12	11
(Denmark) Lonny Bostofte	11	11	8

Round of 16
(Japan) Yuki	11	11
(Denmark) Myhre	4	0
(England) Beck	11	11
(West Germany) Zizmann	7	7
(Netherlands) van Beusekom	10	11	11
(England) Gardner	12	7	5
(Sweden) Stuart	11	11
(Republic of Ireland) Beckett	2	1

Quarter-finals
(Japan) Yuki	11	11
(England) Beck	5	0
(Netherlands) van Beusekom	12	11
(Sweden) Stuart	10	9

Semi-finals
(Japan) Yuki	12	8	11
(Netherlands) van Beusekom	10	11	4

=== Section 2 ===
Round of 32
(England) Gillian Gilks	11	11
(Republic of Ireland) Mary Bryan	1	2
(Denmark) Ulla Strand	11	11
(Sweden) Karin Lindqvist	5	4
(Japan) Etsuko Takenaka	11	11
(West Germany) Gudrun Ziebold	2	3
(Denmark) Jette Foge	11	11
(Netherlands) Marjan Luesken	7	5
(Denmark) Lene Køppen	11	11
(England) Barbara Giles	2	2
(West Germany) Eva Maria Kranz	11	11
(England) M J Brewer	1	4
(Denmark) Pernille Kaagaard	11	11
(Scotland) Anne Johnstone	1	0
(England) Heather Nielsen	11	4	11
(West Germany) Irmgard Gerlatzka +	2	11	5

Round of 16
(England) Gilks	11	11
(Denmark) Strand	8	4
(Japan) Takenaka	12	11
(Denmark) Foge	10	6
(Denmark) Køppen	11	11
(West Germany) Kranz	6	4
(Denmark) Kaagaard	11	11
(England) Nielsen	8	2

Quarter-finals
(England) Gilks	11	11
(Japan) Takenaka	4	6
(Denmark) Køppen	11	11
(Denmark) Kaagaard	4	4

Semi-finals
(England) Gilks	11	11
(Denmark) Køppen	4	8
