= 1973 All England Badminton Championships =

1973 All England Championships
Tournament details
- Dates: 21 March 1973– 24 March 1973
- Edition: 63rd
- Venue: Wembley Arena
- Location: London

The 1973 All England Championships was a badminton tournament held at Wembley Arena, London, England, from 21–24 March 1973.

== Final results ==
Category	Winners	Runners-up	Score
Men's singles	(Indonesia) Rudy Hartono	(Indonesia) Christian Hadinata	15-6, 15-2
Women's singles	(England) Margaret Beck	(England) Gillian Gilks	11-8, 11-0
Men's doubles	(Indonesia) Christian Hadinata & Ade Chandra	(Indonesia) Johan Wahjudi & Tjun Tjun	15-1, 15-7
Women's doubles	(Japan) Machiko Aizawa & Etsuko Takanaka	(England) Margaret Beck & Gillian Gilks	15-10, 10-15, 15-11
Mixed doubles	(England) Derek Talbot & Gillian Gilks	(England) Elliot Stuart & Nora Gardner	9-15, 15-13, 15-8

== Men's singles ==
=== Section 1 ===
Round of 32
1	(Indonesia) Rudy Hartono	15	15
(Mexico) Victor Jaramillo Luque	3	2
(Sweden) Kurt Johnsson	6	15	17
(India) Prakash Padukone	15	10	14
(Denmark) Elo Hansen	15	15
(Japan) Tsutomu Imaizumi	8	8
(England) Derek Talbot	15	15
(England) Tim Goode	8	4
(Indonesia) Tjun Tjun	15	15
(England) Keith Arthur	5	11
(Scotland) Bob McCoig	14	18	15
(England) Ray Sharp	15	16	11
(Sweden) Sture Johnsson	15	15
(West Germany) Michael Schnaase	11	9
(Indonesia) Amril Nurman	15	15
(Thailand) Sangop Rattanusorn	4	8

Round of 16
1	(Indonesia) Hartono	15	15
(Sweden) Johnsson	1	6
(Denmark) Hansen	15	5	15
(England) Talbot	8	15	10
(Indonesia) Tjun Tjun	15	15
(Scotland) McCoig	9	5
(Sweden) Johnsson S	15	12	15
(Indonesia) Nurman	7	15	2

Quarter-finals
1	(Indonesia) Hartono	15	18
(Denmark) Hansen	2	17
(Indonesia) Tjun Tjun	15	15
(Sweden) Johnsson S	13	7

Semi-finals
1	(Indonesia) Hartono	15	15
(Indonesia) Tjun Tjun	7	1

=== Section 2 ===
Round of 32
(Indonesia) Christian Hadinata	18	15
(England) Mike Tredgett	13	7
(West Germany) Wolfgang Bochow	15	15
(Pakistan) Javed Iqbal	4	10
(Denmark) Klaus Kaagaard	15	15
(Sweden) Tommy Theorin	12	8
(Japan) Junji Honma	6	15	15
(Thailand) Bandid Jaiyen	15	6	3
(Denmark) Svend Andersen Pri	15	15
(Japan) Kinji Zeniya	4	0
(Mexico) Diaz Gonzalez	15	15
(West Germany) Gerhard Kucki	4	13
(Sweden) Thomas Kihlström	15	15
(England) D H White	5	6
5	(Indonesia) Muljadi	15	8	5
(England) Paul Whetnall	12	15	11 ret

Round of 16
(Indonesia) Christian	9	15	15
(West Germany) Bochow	15	11	6
(Denmark) Kaagaard	15	15
(Japan) Honma	11	8
(Denmark) Pri	15	15
(Mexico) Gonzalez	10	11
(Sweden) Kihlstrom	15	5
5	(Indonesia) Muljadi	13	15

Quarter-finals
(Indonesia) Christian	15	15
(Denmark) Kaagaard	6	4
(Denmark) Pri	17	15
(Sweden) Kihlstrom	15	2

Semi-finals
(Indonesia) Christian	15	6	15
(Denmark) Pri	7	15	13

+ Denotes seed

== Women's singles ==
=== Section 1 ===
Round of 32
(England) Margaret Beck	11	11
(Republic of Ireland) Barbara Beckett	4	0
(England) Sue Whetnall	11	11
(South Africa) Deirdre Tyghe	2	3
(Japan) Etsuko Takenaka	11	11	11
(Indonesia) Utami Dewi Kurniawan	6	12	3
(Denmark) Lonny Bostofte	11	11
(Australia) Kay Nesbit	2	6
(Denmark) Lene Køppen	11	11
(West Germany) Irmgard Gertlatzka	3	7
(England) Heather Nielsen	9	11	11
(Scotland) Anne Johnstone	12	2	2
=1	(Sweden) Eva Twedberg	11	11
(Indonesia) Taty Sumirah	6	6
(United States) Tyna Barinaga

Round of 16
(England) Beck	11	11
(England) Whetnall	3	8
(Japan) Takenaka	11	11
(Denmark) Bostofte	5	7
(Denmark) Køppen	11	11
(England) Nielsen H	2	2
(Sweden) Twedberg	11	11
(United States) Tarinaga	2	0

Quarter-finals
(England) Beck	11	11
(Japan) Takenaka	3	3
(Denmark) Køppen	11	11
(Sweden) Twedberg	6	1

Semi-finals
(England) Beck	11	11
(Denmark) Køppen	2	5

=== Section 2 ===
Round of 32
(England) Gillian Gilks	11	5	11
(West Germany) Brigitte Steden	2	11	1
(Denmark) Lizbeth von Barnekow	11	11
(Netherlands) Hanke de Kort	7	6
(Denmark) Imre Nielsen	11	11
(Netherlands) Agnes Van der Meulen	4	4
(England) Barbara Giles	11	12
(West Germany) Vera Winter	6	9
=1	(Japan) Hiroe Yuki	11	12
(Scotland) Joanna Flockhart	4	11
(West Germany) Gudrun Ziebold	11	7	12
(Denmark) Ulla Strand	6	11	10
(Netherlands) Joke Van Beusekom	11	11
(Denmark) Lene Buchert	3	3
(England) Nora Gardner

Round of 16
(England) Gilks	11	11
(Denmark) von Barnekow	1	0
(Denmark) Nielsen I	11	11
(England) Giles	0	1
(Japan) Yuki	11	11
(West Germany) Ziebold	6	7
(Netherlands) Van Beusekom	11	5	11
(England) Gardner	2	11	2

Quarter-finals
(England) Gilks	11	12
(Denmark) Nielsen I	4	9
(Japan) Yuki	11	11
(Netherlands) Van Beusekom	8	4

Semi-finals
(England) Gilks	11	11
(Japan) Yuki	4	5
