= 1971 All England Badminton Championships =

1971 All England Championships
Tournament details
- Dates: 24 March 1971– 28 March 1971
- Edition: 61st
- Venue: Wembley Arena
- Location: London

The 1971 All England Championships was a badminton tournament held at Wembley Arena, London, England, from 24–28 March 1971.

== Final results ==
Category	Winners	Runners-up	Score
Men's singles	(Indonesia) Rudy Hartono	(Indonesia) Muljadi	15-1, 15-5
Women's singles	(Sweden) Eva Twedberg	(Denmark) Anne Berglund	11-3, 6-11, 11-2
Men's doubles	(Malaysia) Ng Boon Bee & Punch Gunalan	(Indonesia) Rudy Hartono & Indra Gunawan	15-5, 15-3
Women's doubles	(Japan) Noriko Takagi & Hiroe Yuki	(England) Gillian Gilks & Judy Hashman	15-10, 18-13
Mixed doubles	(Denmark) Svend Pri & Ulla Strand	(England) Derek Talbot & Gillian Gilks	15-12, 8-15, 15-11

The defending women's champion Etsuko Takenaka withdrew with an injured knee. Judy Hashman represented England instead of the United States and Gillian Perrin married meaning her name would now be Gillian Gilks. Irmgard Latz married and became Imgard Gerlatzka and Pernille Molgaard-Hansen married and became Pernille Kaagaard.

== Men's singles ==
=== Section 1 ===
Round of 32
(Indonesia) Rudy Hartono +	15	15
(England) David Hunt	3	3
(Denmark) Bendt Rose	15	7
(England) Peter Wood	15	6
(Denmark) Svend Pri +	15	14	15
(Sweden) Sture Johnsson	5	17	1
(Japan) Shoichi Toganoo
(Jamaica) Max Lawson
(Denmark) Klaus Kaagaard	15	15
(Malaysia) Lee Kok Pheng	9	9
(Netherlands) Piet Ridder	18	15
(Singapore) Lee Kin Tat	16	10
(Denmark) Tage Nielsen	15	9	15
(Scotland) Bob McCoig	13	15	3
(Canada) Wayne MacDonnell	15	15
(England) Elliott Stuart	8	7

Round of 16
(Indonesia) Hartono	15	15
(Denmark) Rose	0	4
(Denmark) Pri	15	15
(Japan) Toganoo	6	4
(Denmark) Kagaard	15	15
(Netherlands) Ridder	11	2
(Denmark) Nielsen	15	18
(Canada) MacDonnell	12	16

Quarter-finals
(Indonesia) Hartono	15	15
(Denmark) Pri	3	10
(Denmark) Kagaard	10	15
(Denmark) Nielsen	15	10	ret

Semi-finals
(Indonesia) Hartono	15	15
(Denmark) Kagaard	1	4

=== Section 2 ===
Round of 32
(Indonesia) Muljadi +	15	15
(England) Clive Kirk	5	5
(Mexico) Roy Diaz Gonzalez	15	15	15
(Denmark) Erland Kops	6	12	10
(Denmark) Elo Hansen +	15	15
(Sweden) Thomas Kihlström	11	9
(England) Brian White	15	15
(England) William Kidd	5	10
(West Germany) Wolfgang Bochow	15	15
(Indonesia) Iie Sumirat	11	5
(Japan) Ippei Kojima +	15	15
(Sweden) Tommy Theorin	10	2
(England) Ray Stevens	9	15	15
(Denmark) Flemming Delfs	15	2	9
(Denmark) Hans Henrik Svendsen	15	15
(West Germany) Willi Braun	6	10

Round of 16
(Indonesia) Muljadi	18	15
(Mexico) Gonzalez	13	4
(Denmark) Hansen	15	15
(England) White	9	2
(West Germany) Bochow	15	8	15
(Japan) Kojima	9	15	10
(England) Stevens	15	15
(Denmark) Svendsen	11	12

Quarter-finals
(Indonesia) Muljadi	13	15	15
(Denmark) Hansen	18	12	5
(West Germany) Bochow	16	15	17
(England) Stevens	18	5	15

Semi-finals
(Indonesia) Muljadi	15	15
(West Germany) Bochow	8	11

+ Denotes seed

== Women's singles ==
=== Section 1 ===
Round of 32
(Sweden) Eva Twedberg +	11	11
(West Germany) Brigitte Potthoff	3	8
(Malaysia) Rosalind Singha Ang	11	11
(Republic of Ireland) Barbara Beckett	0	1
(West Germany) Irmgard Gerlatzka	11	11
(Canada) Susan Cutmore	0	3
(Denmark) Anne Flindt	11	11
(Netherlands) Lilli Ter Metz	6	8
(Japan) Noriko Takagi +	11	11
(Denmark) Pernille Kaagaard	0	1
(West Germany) Karin Dittberner	11	12
(England) Nora Gardner	7	11
(England) Gillian Gilks +	11	11
(Denmark) Karin Jørgensen	5	1
(Netherlands) Marjan Luesken	11	11
(Scotland) Joanna Flockhart	5	7

Round of 16
(Sweden) Twedberg	11	11
(Malaysia) Ang	1	0
(West Germany) Gerlatzka	11	11
(Denmark) Flindt	8	5
(Japan) Takagi
(West Germany) Dittberner
(England) Gilks
(Netherlands) Luesken

Quarter-finals
(Sweden) Twedberg	11	11
(West Germany) Gerlatzka	6	3
(Japan) Takagi	11	11
(England) Gilks	8	1

Semi-finals
(Sweden) Twedberg	6	11	11
(Japan) Takagi	11	5	5

=== Section 2 ===
Round of 32
(Denmark) Anne Berglund	11	11
(Thailand) Thongkam Kingmanee +	8	7
(Netherlands) Joke Van Beusekom	11	11
(England) Barbara Giles	0	2
(Japan) Hiroe Yuki +	11	11
(Denmark) Jette Foge	7	3
(West Germany) Gudrun Ziebold	11	11
(England) Magaret Gardner	2	3
(Denmark) Lizbeth Von Barnekow +	5	11	11
(Japan) Machiko Aizawa	11	1	5
(Australia) Kay Nesbit	11	11
(Scotland) Maureen Hume	8	1
(England) Margaret Beck +	11	11
(Denmark) Annie Bog Jorgensen	2	4
(Malaysia) Sylvia Ng	11	11
(Denmark) Eva Carlsen	7	0

Round of 16
(Denmark) Berglund	3	11	12
(Netherlands) Van Beusekom	11	8	9
(Japan) Yuki
(West Germany) Ziebold
(Denmark) Von Barnekow	11	11
(Australia) Nesbit	5	3
(England) Beck	11	11
(Malaysia) Ng	2	7

Quarter-finals
(Denmark) Berglund	11	11
(Japan) Yuki	2	9
(Denmark) Von Barnekow	11	11
(England) Beck	5	3

Semi-finals
(Denmark) Berglund	11	7	11
(Denmark) Von Barnekow	7	11	8
