= Badminton at the 1972 Summer Olympics =

Badminton at the Games of the XX Olympiad
- Venue: Volleyballhalle, Munich, West Germany
- Dates: 4 September 1972
- No. of events: 4 (2 men, 1 women, 1 mixed)
- Competitors: 25 (17 men, 8 women) from 11 nations

The badminton tournament was one of two demonstration sports at the 1972 Summer Olympics in Munich. It was the first time that the sport was part of the Olympic program, and it would become an official Olympic sport 20 years later at the 1992 Summer Olympics.

== Medallists ==
Event	Gold	Silver	Bronze
Men's singles	Rudy Hartono; Indonesia	Svend Pri; Denmark	Sture Johnsson; Sweden
Men's singles	Rudy Hartono; Indonesia	Svend Pri; Denmark	Wolfgang Bochow; West Germany
Women's singles	Noriko Nakayama; Japan	Utami Dewi; Indonesia	Gillian Gilks; Great Britain
Women's singles	Noriko Nakayama; Japan	Utami Dewi; Indonesia	Hiroe Yuki; Japan
Men's doubles	Indonesia; Ade Chandra; Christian Hadinata	Malaysia; Punch Gunalan; Ng Boon Bee	Great Britain; Elliot Stuart; Derek Talbot
Men's doubles	Indonesia; Ade Chandra; Christian Hadinata	Malaysia; Punch Gunalan; Ng Boon Bee	West Germany; Willi Braun; Roland Maywald
Mixed doubles	Great Britain; Derek Talbot; Gillian Gilks	Denmark; Svend Pri; Ulla Strand	West Germany; Roland Maywald; Brigitte Steden
Mixed doubles	Great Britain; Derek Talbot; Gillian Gilks	Denmark; Svend Pri; Ulla Strand	Indonesia; Christian Hadinata; Utami Dewi

== Medal table ==
Rank	Nation	Gold	Silver	Bronze	Total
1	Indonesia	2	1	1	4
2	Great Britain	1	0	2	3
3	Japan	1	0	1	2
4	Denmark	0	2	0	2
5	Malaysia	0	1	0	1
6	West Germany	0	0	3	3
7	Sweden	0	0	1	1
Totals (7 entries)		4	4	8	16

== Event results ==
25 participants from 11 countries took part in four events. Several entries in the doubles events were mixed teams of players from different nations, a practice not allowed in official medal events at the Olympic Games since 1904. All competition took place on September 4.

=== Men's singles ===
1st round
1	Rudy Hartono (INA)	15	14	15
8	Jamie Paulson (CAN)	12	18	3
4	Sture Johnsson (SWE)	15	15
5	Suresh Goel (IND)	6	8
3	Svend Pri (DEN)	15	15
6	Bandid Jaiyen (THA)	11	2
2	Wolfgang Bochow (FRG)	15	15
7	Tan Aik Mong (MAS)	10	5

Semifinals
Rudy Hartono (INA)	15	15
Sture Johnsson (SWE)	2	4
Svend Pri (DEN)	9	15	15
Wolfgang Bochow (FRG)	15	9	8

Final
Rudy Hartono (INA)	15	15
Svend Pri (DEN)	6	1

=== Men's doubles ===
1st round
1	Ade Chandra (Indonesia) Christian Hadinata (INA)	15	15
8	Bandid Jaiyen (THA); Tan Aik Mong (MAS)	7	1
4	Elliot Stuart (United Kingdom) Derek Talbot (GBR)	15	15
5	Wolfgang Bochow (FRG); Jamie Paulson (CAN)	3	9
3	Punch Gunalan (Malaysia) Ng Boon Bee (MAS)	15	15
6	Suresh Goel (IND); Ippei Kojima (JPN)	8	1
2	Willi Braun (West Germany) Roland Maywald (FRG)
7	bye

Semifinals
Ade Chandra (Indonesia) Christian Hadinata (INA)	15	15
Elliot Stuart (United Kingdom) Derek Talbot (GBR)	8	12
Punch Gunalan (Malaysia) Ng Boon Bee (MAS)	12	15	15
Willi Braun (West Germany) Roland Maywald (FRG)	15	10	11

Final
Ade Chandra (Indonesia) Christian Hadinata (INA)	15	2	15
Punch Gunalan (Malaysia) Ng Boon Bee (MAS)	4	15	11

=== Women's singles ===
1st round
1	Noriko Nakayama (JPN)	11	11
8	Ulla Strand (DEN)	5	4
4	Gillian Gilks (GBR)	11	11
5	Brigitte Steden (FRG)	9	6
3	Utami Dewi (INA)	11	11
6	Eva Twedberg (SWE)	7	8
2	Hiroe Yuki (JPN)	11	11
7	Joke van Beusekom (NED)	3	4

Semifinals
Noriko Nakayama (JPN)	11	8	11
Gillian Gilks (GBR)	3	11	9
Utami Dewi (INA)	11	11
Hiroe Yuki (JPN)	5	9

Final
Noriko Nakayama (JPN)	11	11
Utami Dewi (INA)	5	3

=== Mixed doubles ===
1st round
1	Derek Talbot (United Kingdom) Gillian Gilks (GBR)	15	15
8	Ippei Kojima (Japan) Noriko Nakayama (JPN)	9	4
4	Roland Maywald (West Germany) Brigitte Steden (FRG)	15	15
5	Sture Johnsson (Sweden) Eva Twedberg (SWE)	7	11
3	Svend Pri (Denmark) Ulla Strand (DEN)
6	bye
2	Christian Hadinata (Indonesia) Utami Dewi (INA)	15	15	15
7	Elliot Stuart (GBR); Joke van Beusekom (NED)	9	17	2

Semifinals
Derek Talbot (United Kingdom) Gillian Gilks (GBR)	15	15
Roland Maywald (West Germany) Brigitte Steden (FRG)	10	8
Svend Pri (Denmark) Ulla Strand (DEN)	15	15
Christian Hadinata (Indonesia) Utami Dewi (INA)	12	10

Final
Derek Talbot (United Kingdom) Gillian Gilks (GBR)	15	18
Svend Pri (Denmark) Ulla Strand (DEN)	6	16
