= Gillian Gilks =

English badminton player (born 1950)

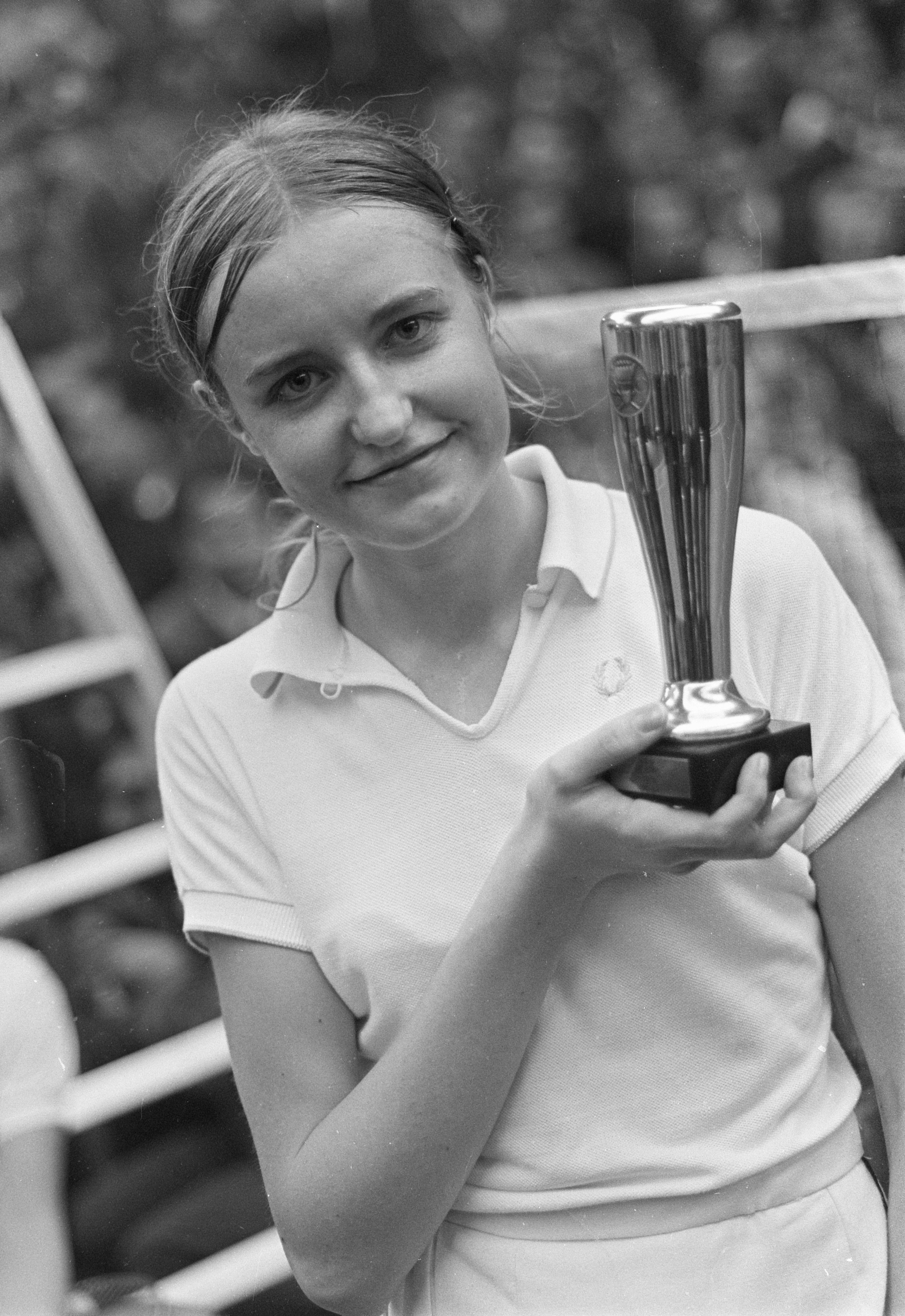
- Gillian Perrin in 1969

Personal information
- Nationality: British (English)
- Born: Gillian Perrin; 20 June 1950 (age 76) Surrey, England

Sport
- Country: England
- Sport: Badminton
- Handedness: Right
- Coached by: Mike Goodwin, H Ian Palmer
- Highest ranking: 1 (1978)
Medal record
Women's badminton
Representing Great Britain
World Games
Gold medal – first place	1981 Santa Clara	Mixed doubles
Representing England
World Championships
Silver medal – second place	1977 Malmö	Women's singles
Silver medal – second place	1977 Malmö	Mixed doubles
Bronze medal – third place	1983 Copenhagen	Women's doubles
Bronze medal – third place	1987 Beijing	Mixed doubles
World Cup
Gold medal – first place	1983 Kuala Lumpur	Mixed doubles
Bronze medal – third place	1983 Kuala Lumpur	Women's doubles
Bronze medal – third place	1984 Jakarta	Women's doubles
Bronze medal – third place	1984 Jakarta	Mixed doubles
Bronze medal – third place	1985 Jakarta	Mixed doubles
Uber Cup
Silver medal – second place	1984 Kuala Lumpur	Women's team
Commonwealth Games
Gold medal – first place	1974 Christchurch	Women's doubles
Gold medal – first place	1974 Christchurch	Mixed doubles
Silver medal – second place	1970 Edinburgh	Women's doubles
Silver medal – second place	1970 Edinburgh	Mixed doubles
European Championships
Gold medal – first place	1972 Karlskrona	Women's doubles
Gold medal – first place	1972 Karlskrona	Mixed doubles
Gold medal – first place	1974 Vienna	Women's singles
Gold medal – first place	1974 Vienna	Women's doubles
Gold medal – first place	1974 Vienna	Mixed doubles
Gold medal – first place	1976 Dublin	Women's singles
Gold medal – first place	1976 Dublin	Women's doubles
Gold medal – first place	1976 Dublin	Mixed doubles
Gold medal – first place	1982 Böblingen	Women's doubles
Gold medal – first place	1982 Böblingen	Mixed doubles
Gold medal – first place	1984 Preston	Mixed doubles
Gold medal – first place	1986 Uppsala	Mixed doubles
Silver medal – second place	1972 Karlskrona	Women's singles
Silver medal – second place	1968 Bochum	Women's doubles
Silver medal – second place	1968 Bochum	Mixed doubles
Silver medal – second place	1970 Port Talbot	Mixed doubles
Silver medal – second place	1984 Preston	Women's doubles
Bronze medal – third place	1970 Port Talbot	Women's doubles
European Mixed Team Championships
Gold medal – first place	1972 Karlskrona	Mixed team
Gold medal – first place	1974 Vienna	Mixed team
Gold medal – first place	1982 Böblingen	Mixed team
Gold medal – first place	1984 Preston	Mixed team
Silver medal – second place	1976 Dublin	Mixed team
Silver medal – second place	1986 Uppsala	Mixed team

Gillian M. Gilks MBE (formerly Gillian Perrin, and later Gillian Goodwin; born 20 June 1950) is an English former badminton player who won numerous major titles in all three events (singles, doubles, and mixed doubles) between the late 1960s and the mid-1980s. Gilks was the first ever women's singles world number one in the first IBF world ranking release in 1978.

== Biography ==
Tall and slender in her badminton prime Gilks has won twelve titles in the European Badminton Championships, two of them in women's singles, four in women's doubles and six in mixed doubles. She has also won eleven titles in the All England Open Championships; two in women's singles, three in women's doubles, and six in mixed doubles. In 1976 she won all three events at the All Englands making her the last person to "sweep the board" there in a single year. She also won a Gold and bronze medal at the 1972 Olympics when badminton was played as a demonstration sport. In 1999, she was inducted into the World Badminton Hall of Fame.

She represented the England team at the 1970 British Commonwealth Games in Edinburgh, Scotland, where she competed in the badminton events, winning three silver medals.

Shortly after the Games, she married 29 year old Michael Gilks of Newcastle Lyme, an umpire of the Badminton Association of England, and electrical engineer, on 26 September 1970 in Epsom, and moved to Kings Heath. She was awarded the MBE in the 1976 New Year Honours.

She moved to Steyning in 1976.

== Achievements ==
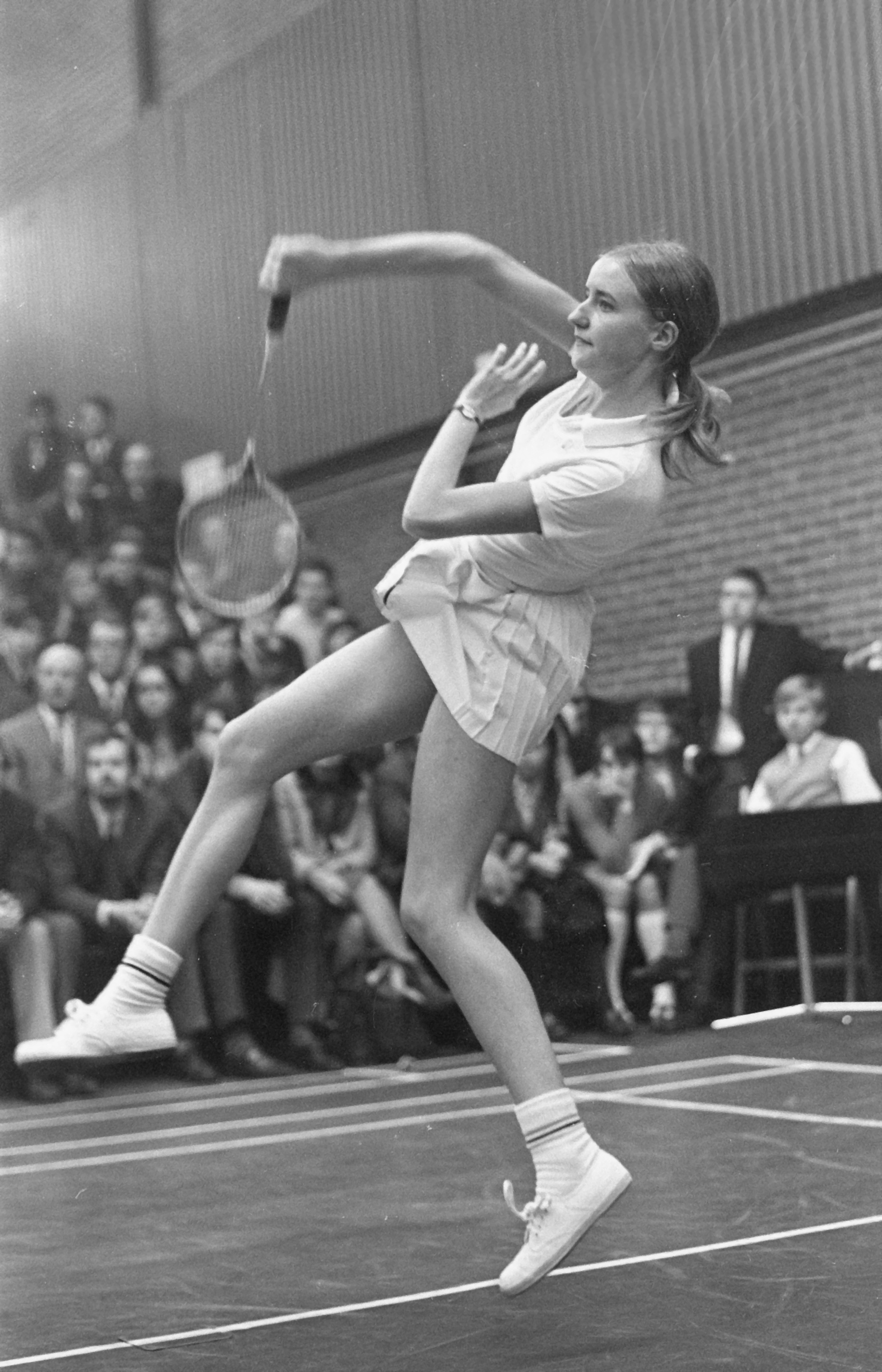
Gillian Perrin in 1969

=== Olympic Games (demonstration) ===
Women's singles
Year	Venue	Opponent	Score	Result
1972	Volleyballhalle, Munich, West Germany	(Japan) Noriko Nakayama	3–11, 11–8, 9–11	Bronze

Mixed doubles
Year	Venue	Partner	Opponent	Score	Result
1972	Volleyballhalle, Munich, West Germany	(United Kingdom) Derek Talbot	(Denmark) Svend Pri (Denmark) Ulla Strand	15–6, 18–16	Gold

=== World Championships ===
Women's singles
Year	Venue	Opponent	Score	Result
1977	Malmö Isstadion, Malmö, Sweden	(Denmark) Lene Køppen	9–12, 11–12	Silver

Women's doubles
Year	Venue	Partner	Opponent	Score	Result
1983	Brøndbyhallen, Copenhagen, Denmark	(England) Gillian Clark	(China) Lin Ying (China) Wu Dixi	3–15, 17–18	Bronze

Mixed doubles
Year	Venue	Partner	Opponent	Score	Result
1977	Malmö Isstadion, Malmö, Sweden	(England) Derek Talbot	(Denmark) Steen Skovgaard (Denmark) Lene Køppen	12–15, 17–18	Silver
1987	Capital Indoor Stadium, Beijing, China	(England) Martin Dew	(China) Wang Pengren (China) Shi Fangjing	7–15, 8–15	Bronze

=== World Cup ===
Women's doubles
Year	Venue	Partner	Opponent	Score	Result
1983	Stadium Negara, Kuala Lumpur, Malaysia	(England) Gillian Clark	(China) Xu Rong (China) Wu Jianqiu	5–15, 3–15	Bronze
1984	Istora Senayan, Jakarta, Indonesia	(China) Li Lingwei	(China) Lin Ying (China) Wu Dixi	3–15, 7–15	Bronze

Mixed doubles
Year	Venue	Partner	Opponent	Score	Result
1983	Stadium Negara, Kuala Lumpur, Malaysia	(England) Martin Dew	(Indonesia) Christian Hadinata (Indonesia) Ivana Lie	15–8, 9–15, 15–8	Gold
1984	Istora Senayan, Jakarta, Indonesia	(England) Martin Dew	(Indonesia) Christian Hadinata (Indonesia) Ivana Lie	15–4, 3–15, 10–15	Bronze
1985	Istora Senayan, Jakarta, Indonesia	(England) Martin Dew	(Denmark) Steen Fladberg (England) Nora Perry	8–15, 7–15	Bronze

=== World Games ===
Mixed doubles
Year	Venue	Partner	Opponent	Score	Result
1981	San Jose Civic Auditorium, California, United States	(Sweden) Thomas Kihlström	(United Kingdom) Mike Tredgett (United Kingdom) Nora Perry	15–6, 18–14	Gold

=== Commonwealth Games ===
Women's singles
Year	Venue	Opponent	Score	Result
1970	Meadowbank Stadium, Edinburgh, Scotland	(England) Margaret Beck	11–5, 3–11, 8–11	Silver
1974	Cowles Stadium, Christchurch, New Zealand	(England) Margaret Beck	11–8, 11–8	Gold

Women's doubles
Year	Venue	Partner	Opponent	Score	Result
1970	Meadowbank Stadium, Edinburgh, Scotland	(England) Julie Rickard	(England) Margaret Boxall (England) Susan Whetnall	9–15, 2–15	Silver
1974	Cowles Stadium, Christchurch, New Zealand	(England) Margaret Beck	(England) Margaret Boxall (England) Susan Whetnall	15–7, 15–5	Gold

Mixed doubles
Year	Venue	Partner	Opponent	Score	Result
1970	Meadowbank Stadium, Edinburgh, Scotland	(England) Roger Mills	(England) Derek Talbot (England) Margaret Boxall	15–8, 12–15, 12–15	Silver
1974	Cowles Stadium, Christchurch, New Zealand	(England) Derek Talbot	(England) Paul Whetnall (England) Nora Gardner	walkover	Gold

=== European Championships ===
Women's singles
Year	Venue	Opponent	Score	Result
1972	Karlskrona Idrottshall, Karlskrona, Sweden	(England) Margaret Beck	0–11, 1–11	Silver
1974	Stadthalle, Vienna, Austria	(Denmark) Lene Køppen	11–6, 11–5	Gold
1976	Fitzwilliam Club, Dublin, Ireland	(Denmark) Lene Køppen	11–6, 12–11	Gold

Women's doubles
Year	Venue	Partner	Opponent	Score	Result
1968	Ruhrlandhalle, Bochum, Germany	(England) Angela Bairstow	(England) Margaret Boxall (England) Susan Whetnall	7–15, 13–18	Silver
1970	Afan Lido, Port Talbot, Wales	(England) Margaret Beck	(West Germany) Irmgard Latz (West Germany) Marieluise Wackerow	13–15, 15–9, 3–15	Bronze
1972	Karlskrona Idrottshall, Karlskrona, Sweden	(England) Judy Hashman	(England) Margaret Beck (England) Julie Rickard	15–11, 15–7	Gold
1974	Stadthalle, Vienna, Austria	(England) Margaret Beck	(England) Nora Gardner (England) Susan Whetnall	15–10, 15–13	Gold
1976	Fitzwilliam Club, Dublin, Ireland	(England) Susan Whetnall	(England) Margaret Beck (England) Nora Gardner	15–4, 15–8	Gold
1982	Sporthalle, Böblingen, West Germany	(England) Gillian Clark	(England) Nora Perry (England) Jane Webster	15–3, 15–11	Gold
1984	Guild Hall, Preston, England	(England) Karen Beckman	(England) Karen Chapman (England) Gillian Clark	17–15, 12–15, 2–15	Silver

Mixed doubles
Year	Venue	Partner	Opponent	Score	Result
1968	Ruhrlandhalle, Bochum, Germany	(England) Roger Mills	(England) Anthony D. Jordan (England) Susan Whetnall	13–15, 9–15	Silver
1970	Afan Lido, Port Talbot, Wales	(England) Derek Talbot	(England) David Eddy (England) Susan Whetnall	16–17, 16–17	Silver
1972	Karlskrona Idrottshall, Karlskrona, Sweden	(England) Derek Talbot	(West Germany) Wolfgang Bochow (West Germany) Marieluise Wackerow	15–6, 15–4	Gold
1974	Stadthalle, Vienna, Austria	(England) Derek Talbot	(England) Elliot Stuart (England) Susan Whetnall	5–15, 15–3, 15–3	Gold
1976	Fitzwilliam Club, Dublin, Ireland	(England) Derek Talbot	(Denmark) Steen Skovgaard (Denmark) Lene Køppen	6–15, 15–12, 17–15	Gold
1982	Sporthalle, Böblingen, West Germany	(England) Martin Dew	(England) Mike Tredgett (England) Nora Perry	15–12, 15–5	Gold
1984	Guild Hall, Preston, England	(England) Martin Dew	(Sweden) Thomas Kihlström (Sweden) Maria Bengtsson	15–5, 17–15	Gold
1986	Fyrishallen, Uppsala, Sweden	(England) Martin Dew	(England) Nigel Tier (England) Gillian Gowers	15–6, 15–8	Gold

=== IBF World Grand Prix ===
The World Badminton Grand Prix sanctioned by International Badminton Federation (IBF) from 1983 to 2006.

Women's doubles
Year	Tournament	Partner	Opponent	Score	Result
1984	Dutch Open	(England) Karen Beckman	(Denmark) Dorte Kjær (Denmark) Kirsten Larsen	15–12, 15–10	(gold) Winner
1984	German Open	(England) Karen Beckman	(England) Karen Chapman (England) Gillian Clark	17–14, 18–14	(gold) Winner
1984	Japan Open	(England) Karen Beckman	(Indonesia) Ruth Damayanti (Indonesia) Maria Fransisca	13–15, 15–3, 15–12	(gold) Winner
1984	Thailand Open	(England) Karen Beckman	(England) Gillian Gowers (England) Helen Troke	18–16, 17–18, 15–9	(gold) Winner
1984	Chinese Taipei Open	(England) Karen Beckman	(Indonesia) Ruth Damayanti (Indonesia) Maria Fransisca	15–12, 9–15, 17–14	(gold) Winner
1985	German Open	(England) Karen Beckman	(China) Guan Weizhen (China) Wu Jianqiu	9–15, 15–6, 9–15	(silver) Runner-up
1985	Chinese Taipei Open	(England) Karen Beckman	(England) Gillian Clark (England) Nora Perry	15–10, 14–17, 0–15	(silver) Runner-up
1985	Denmark Open	(England) Nora Perry	(South Korea) Kim Yun-ja (South Korea) Yoo Sang-hee	7–15, 7–15	(silver) Runner-up

Mixed doubles
Year	Tournament	Partner	Opponent	Score	Result
1983	Scandinavian Cup	(England) Martin Dew	(England) Mike Tredgett (England) Karen Chapman	15–13, 15–12	(gold) Winner
1983	Indonesia Open	(England) Martin Dew	(Indonesia) Christian Hadinata (Indonesia) Ivana Lie	17–18, 9–15	(silver) Runner-up
1984	German Open	(England) Martin Dew	(England) Mike Tredgett (England) Karen Chapman	15–5, 12–15, 15–11	(gold) Winner
1984	All England Open	(England) Martin Dew	(England) Nigel Tier (England) Gillian Gowers	15–8, 15–3	(gold) Winner
1984	Scandinavian Cup	(England) Martin Dew	(England) Dipak Tailor (England) Gillian Gowers	17–14, 15–3	(gold) Winner
1984	Dutch Open	(England) Martin Dew	(Scotland) Billy Gilliland (England) Gillian Gowers	17–14, 13–15, 15–6	(gold) Winner
1984	Indonesia Open	(England) Martin Dew	(Indonesia) Christian Hadinata (Indonesia) Ivana Lie	12–15, 7–15	(silver) Runner-up
1984	Dutch Masters	(England) Martin Dew	(China) Jiang Guoliang (China) Lin Ying	15–10, 14–17, 15–10	(gold) Winner
1984	Japan Open	(England) Martin Dew	(Sweden) Thomas Kihlström (Sweden) Maria Bengtsson	5–15, 15–3, 18–16	(gold) Winner
1985	German Open	(England) Martin Dew	(England) Nigel Tier (England) Gillian Gowers	12–15, 15–4, 15–13	(gold) Winner
1985	Indonesia Open	(England) Martin Dew	(England) Nigel Tier (England) Gillian Gowers	15–12, 15–0	(gold) Winner
1985	Japan Open	(England) Martin Dew	(Scotland) Billy Gilliland (England) Gillian Gowers	10–15, 15–18	(silver) Runner-up
1985	Chinese Taipei Open	(England) Martin Dew	(Scotland) Billy Gilliland (England) Gillian Gowers	15–8, 15–10	(gold) Winner
1985	Denmark Open	(England) Martin Dew	(England) Dipak Tailor (England) Nora Perry	8–15, 15–8, 10–15	(silver) Runner-up
1985	Hong Kong Open	(England) Martin Dew	(Scotland) Billy Gilliland (England) Gillian Gowers	15–10, 18–16	(gold) Winner
1986	German Open	(England) Martin Dew	(South Korea) Lee Deuk-choon (South Korea) Chung Myung-hee	15–10, 17–18, 10–15	(silver) Runner-up
1986	Malaysia Open	(Denmark) Steen Fladberg	(Indonesia) Bobby Ertanto (Indonesia) Verawaty Fadjrin	7–15, 15–18	(silver) Runner-up
1986	Carlton Intersport Cup	(England) Martin Dew	(England) Nigel Tier (England) Gillian Gowers	15–12, 15–4	(gold) Winner
1986	Scandinavian Cup	(England) Martin Dew	(South Korea) Lee Deuk-choon (South Korea) Chung Myung-hee	17–16, 12–15, 15–7	(gold) Winner
1986	Denmark Open	(England) Martin Dew	(Denmark) Jesper Knudsen (Denmark) Nettie Nielsen	15–10, 15–11	(gold) Winner
1987	German Open	(England) Martin Dew	(England) Dipak Tailor (England) Gillian Clark	15–12, 15–7	(gold) Winner
1987	Poona Open	(England) Martin Dew	(England) Andy Goode (England) Fiona Elliott	18–14, 18–14	(gold) Winner
1988	German Open	(England) Martin Dew	(Denmark) Steen Fladberg (England) Gillian Clark	15–9, 14–18, 4–15	(silver) Runner-up

=== International tournaments ===
Women's singles
Year	Tournament	Opponent	Score	Result
1969	Swedish Open	(Denmark) Anne Flindt	11–12, 11–2, 11–4	(gold) Winner
1969	Dutch Open	(West Germany) Marieluise Wackerow	11–4, 5–11, 11–0	(gold) Winner
1969	Irish Open	(Republic of Ireland) Mary Bryan	11–3, 6–11, 11–6	(gold) Winner
1971	Dutch Open	(Sweden) Eva Twedberg	3–11, 11–7, 11–12	(silver) Runner-up
1971	Scottish Open	(England) Margaret Beck	11–9, 11–5	(gold) Winner
1971	Irish Open	(England) Margaret Beck	9–12, 12–10, 6–11	(silver) Runner-up
1972	Scottish Open	(England) Margaret Beck	11–6, 4–11, 4–11	(silver) Runner-up
1973	All England Open	(England) Margaret Beck	8–11, 0–11	(silver) Runner-up
1973	Dutch Open	(Netherlands) Joke van Beusekom	11–2, 12–11	(gold) Winner
1974	All England Open	(Japan) Hiroe Yuki	6–11, 11–12	(silver) Runner-up
1974	Scottish Open	(England) Margaret Beck	8–11, 10–12	(silver) Runner-up
1975	All England Open	(Japan) Hiroe Yuki	5–11, 9–11	(silver) Runner-up
1975	Dutch Open	(England) Margaret Beck	11–7, 11–3	(gold) Winner
1976	German Open	(Denmark) Lene Køppen	5–11, 11–6, 11–6	(gold) Winner
1976	All England Open	(England) Margaret Lockwood	11–0, 11–3	(gold) Winner
1976	U. S. Open	(Denmark) Lene Køppen	8–11, 11–5, 11–6	(gold) Winner
1976	Dutch Open	(Denmark) Lene Køppen	11–5, 6–11, 11–5	(gold) Winner
1976	Swedish Open	(Denmark) Lene Køppen	8–11, 11–5, 11–3	(gold) Winner
1976	Scottish Open	(England) Margaret Lockwood	6–11, 11–4, 11–7	(gold) Winner
1977	Welsh International	(Netherlands) Marjan Ridder	11–5, 11–6	(gold) Winner
1977	Dutch Open	(Netherlands) Joke van Beusekom	11–5, 8–11, 11–1	(gold) Winner
1978	All England Open	(Japan) Saori Kondo	11–1, 11–9	(gold) Winner
1978	Dutch Open	(Canada) Wendy Clarkson	11–3, 8–11, 11–6	(gold) Winner
1979	English Masters	(Denmark) Lene Køppen	10–12, 4–11	(silver) Runner-up
1979	Dutch Open	(Denmark) Lene Køppen	12–10, 12–9	(gold) Winner
1980	Canadian Open	(Canada) Wendy Carter	11–8, 11–8	(gold) Winner
1980	Welsh International	(England) Sally Leadbeater	11–3, 11–2	(gold) Winner
1980	Copenhagen Cup	(Denmark) Lene Køppen	9–12, 2–11	(silver) Runner-up
1980	Bell's Open	(England) Jane Webster	6–11, 8–11	(silver) Runner-up
1981	Copenhagen Cup	(England) Jane Webster	7–11, 12–9, 9–11	(silver) Runner-up
1981	Bell's Open	(England) Sally Podger	0–11, 10–12	(silver) Runner-up
1981	Scottish Open	(England) Paula Kilvington	11–1, 11–3	(gold) Winner
1982	Canadian Open	(England) Sally Podger	11–8, 7–11, 6–11	(silver) Runner-up

Women's doubles
Year	Tournament	Partner	Opponent	Score	Result
1967	Scottish Open	(England) Jenny Horton	(Scotland) Catherine Dunglison (Scotland) Muriel Woodcock	15–6, 15–8	(gold) Winner
1970	Swedish Open	(England) Margaret Boxall	(Denmark) Pernille Mølgaard Hansen (Denmark) Imre Rietveld	15–9, 15–1	(gold) Winner
1970	All England Open	(England) Julie Rickard	(England) Margaret Boxall (England) Susan Whetnall	6–15, 15–8, 9–15	(silver) Runner-up
1971	All England Open	(United States) Judy Hashman	(Japan) Hiroe Yuki (Japan) Noriko Takagi	10–15, 13–18	(silver) Runner-up
1971	Dutch Open	(England) Judy Hashman	(Denmark) Karin Jørgensen (Denmark) Ulla Strand	15–6, 15–2	(gold) Winner
1971	Irish Open	(England) Nora Gardner	(England) Margaret Beck (England) Julie Rickard	12–15, 9–15	(silver) Runner-up
1971	Swedish Open	(England) Margaret Beck	(Denmark) Anne Flindt (Denmark) Pernille Kaagaard	17–14, 18–14	(gold) Winner
1971	Scottish Open	(England) Margaret Beck	(Republic of Ireland) Barbara Beckett (Australia) Kay Nesbit	15–6, 15–7	(gold) Winner
1972	Dutch Open	(England) Judy Hashman	(Germany) Irmgard Gerlatzka (Germany) Marieluise Wackerow	18–16, 15–5	(gold) Winner
1972	Swedish Open	(England) Margaret Beck	(Denmark) Anne Flindt (Denmark) Pernille Kaagaard	15–8, 15–8	(gold) Winner
1972	Scottish Open	(England) Bridget Cooper	(England) Margaret Beck (England) Helen Horton	17–15, 15–6	(gold) Winner
1973	All England Open	(England) Margaret Beck	(Japan) Etsuko Takenaka (Japan) Machiko Aizawa	10–15, 15–10, 11–15	(silver) Runner-up
1973	Dutch Open	(England) Bridget Cooper	(Netherlands) Marjan Luesken (Netherlands) Joke van Beusekom	15–8, 15–6	(gold) Winner
1974	German Open	(England) Margaret Beck	(West Germany) Brigitte Steden (West Germany) Marieluise Zizmann	15–12, 12–15, 15–6	(gold) Winner
1974	All England Open	(England) Margaret Beck	(England) Margaret Boxall (England) Susan Whetnall	15–5, 18–14	(gold) Winner
1974	Scottish Open	(England) Margaret Beck	(England) Margaret Boxall (England) Susan Whetnall	9–15, 15–10, 10–15	(silver) Runner-up
1975	Dutch Open	(England) Margaret Beck	(England) Nora Gardner (England) Susan Whetnall	12–15, 17–14, 7–15	(silver) Runner-up
1975	Swedish Open	(England) Nora Gardner	(England) Barbara Giles (England) Susan Whetnall	9–15, 15–4, 11–15	(silver) Runner-up
1976	German Open	(England) Susan Whetnall	(England) Barbara Giles (England) Jane Webster	15–11, 15–9	(gold) Winner
1976	All England Open	(England) Susan Whetnall	(England) Margaret Beck (England) Nora Gardner	15–10, 15–10	(gold) Winner
1976	U. S. Open	(England) Susan Whetnall	(United States) Pam Bristol Brady (United States) Rosine Jones	15–4, 15–10	(gold) Winner
1976	Dutch Open	(England) Susan Whetnall	(Netherlands) Marjan Luesken (Netherlands) Joke Van Beusekom	15–4, 15–5	(gold) Winner
1976	Swedish Open	(England) Margaret Beck	(Netherlands) Marjan Luesken (Netherlands) Joke Van Beusekom	15–11, 15–4	(gold) Winner
1976	Scottish Open	(England) Susan Whetnall	(England) Margaret Lockwood (England) Nora Gardner	15–5, 15–2	(gold) Winner
1977	Swedish Open	(England) Barbara Giles	(Netherlands) Marjan Ridder (Netherlands) Joke Van Beusekom	15–5, 15–8	(gold) Winner
1978	Dutch Open	(England) Paula Kilvington	(England) Anne Statt (England) Nora Perry	9–15, 7–15	(silver) Runner-up
1979	Dutch Open	(Netherlands) Marjan Ridder	(England) Barbara Sutton (England) Jane Webster	15–12, 15–7	(gold) Winner
1980	All England Open	(England) Nora Perry	(Japan) Atsuko Tokuda (Japan) Yoshiko Yonekura	11–15, 15–7, 15–6	(gold) Winner
1980	Welsh International	(England) Paula Kilvington	(England) Nora Perry (England) Jane Webster	14–17, 15–9, 15–11	(gold) Winner
1980	Copenhagen Cup	(England) Nora Perry	(Netherlands) Joke van Beusekom (Denmark) Lene Køppen	10–15, 15–2, 15–0	(gold) Winner
1980	Bell's Open	(England) Paula Kilvington	(England) Nora Perry (England) Jane Webster	15–8, 15–6	(gold) Winner
1980	Denmark Open	(England) Nora Perry	(Japan) Atsuko Tokuda (Japan) Yoshiko Yonekura	18–15, 9–15, 15–9	(gold) Winner
1981	All England Open	(England) Paula Kilvington	(England) Nora Perry (England) Jane Webster	8–15, 4–15	(silver) Runner-up
1981	Copenhagen Cup	(England) Paula Kilvington	(England) Nora Perry (England) Jane Webster	15–12, 15–8	(gold) Winner
1981	Bell's Open	(England) Nora Perry	(England) Karen Chapman (England) Sally Podger	15–7, 15–13	(gold) Winner
1981	German Open	(England) Paula Kilvington	(England) Karen Chapman (England) Sally Leadbeater	15–8, 15–7	(gold) Winner
1981	English Masters	(Japan) Yoshiko Yonekura	(China) Liu Xia (China) Zhang Ailing	10–15, 15–3, 6–15	(silver) Runner-up
1981	Dutch Open	(England) Paula Kilvington	(England) Nora Perry (England) Jane Webster	15–7, 15–8	(gold) Winner
1981	Scottish Open	(England) Paula Kilvington	(Republic of Ireland) Barbara Beckett (England) Kathleen Redhead	15–13, 15–7	(gold) Winner
1982	Bell's Open	(England) Catharine Troke	(England) Nora Perry (England) Jane Webster	4–15, 5–15	(silver) Runner-up
1982	Canadian Open	(England) Gillian Clark	(Canada) Claire Backhouse-Sharpe (Canada) Johanne Falardeau	17–14, 15–6	(gold) Winner
1982	India Open	(England) Gillian Clark	(England) Karen Chapman (England) Jane Webster	15–1, 15–8	(gold) Winner
1982	Indonesia Open	(England) Gillian Clark	(Japan) Atsuko Tokuda (Japan) Yoshiko Yonekura	17–14, 14–17, 15–12	(gold) Winner
1982	Dutch Open	(England) Gillian Clark	(Denmark) Dorte Kjær (Denmark) Nettie Nielsen	16–18, 15–9, 15–12	(gold) Winner
1982	Scottish Open	(England) Gillian Clark	(England) Helen Troke (England) Barbara Sutton	15–3, 15–8	(gold) Winner
1983	Japan Open	(England) Gillian Clark	(England) Nora Perry (England) Jane Webster	15–6, 15–8	(gold) Winner
1983	Taiwan Masters	(England) Gillian Clark	(England) Nora Perry (England) Jane Webster	15–10, 15–14	(gold) Winner
1983	Dutch Open	(England) Gillian Clark	(England) Karen Chapman (England) Sally Podger	15–8, 17–16	(gold) Winner
1983	English Masters	(England) Gillian Clark	(China) Chen Ruizhen (China) Zheng Jian	7–12 retired	(silver) Runner-up
1983	Dutch Masters	(England) Helen Troke	(Indonesia) Ivana Lie (Indonesia) Rosiana Tendean	15–11, 8–15, 12–15	(silver) Runner-up
1984	Welsh International	(England) Helen Troke	(England) Karen Beckman (England) Karen Chapman	17–14, 15–8	(gold) Winner

Mixed doubles
Year	Tournament	Partner	Opponent	Score	Result
1969	Swedish Open	(England) Roger Mills	(Denmark) Per Walsøe (Denmark) Pernille Mølgaard Hansen	15–12, 15–7	(gold) Winner
1969	Dutch Open	(England) Derek Talbot	(West Germany) Wolfgang Bochow (West Germany) Karin Dittberner	15–7, 1–15, 15–5	(gold) Winner
1969	Irish Open	(England) Roger Mills	(England) Tony Jordan (England) Susan Whetnall	14–15, 13–15	(silver) Runner-up
1969	All England Open	(England) Roger Mills	(England) Tony Jordan (England) Susan Whetnall	9–15, 15–5, 15–12	(gold) Winner
1970	Scottish Open	(England) Roger Mills	(England) Paul Whetnall (England) Margaret Boxall	15–2, 11–15, 15–8	(gold) Winner
1970	Dutch Open	(England) Derek Talbot	(England) David Eddy (England) Margaret Boxall	18–14, 15–8	(gold) Winner
1971	German Open	(England) Derek Talbot	(West Germany) Wolfgang Bochow (Australia) Kay Nesbit	15–8, 15–10	(gold) Winner
1971	All England Open	(England) Derek Talbot	(Denmark) Svend Pri (Denmark) Ulla Strand	12–15, 15–8, 11–15	(silver) Runner-up
1971	Dutch Open	(England) Derek Talbot	(Denmark) Svend Pri (Denmark) Ulla Strand	15–4, 6–15, 17–16	(gold) Winner
1971	Irish Open	(England) Derek Talbot	(England) Roger Mills (England) Julie Rickard	15–4, 15–9	(gold) Winner
1971	Swedish Open	(England) Derek Talbot	(Denmark) Per Walsøe (Denmark) Pernille Kaagaard	5–15, 15–6, 17–14	(gold) Winner
1971	Scottish Open	(England) Roger Mills	(England) Elliot Stuart (England) Helen Horton	15–2, 15–5	(gold) Winner
1972	All England Open	(England) Derek Talbot	(Denmark) Svend Pri (Denmark) Ulla Strand	15–12, 8–15, 12–15	(silver) Runner-up
1972	Swedish Open	(England) David Eddy	(Denmark) Svend Pri (Denmark) Ulla Strand	15–10, 15–8	(gold) Winner
1972	Scottish Open	(England) Derek Talbot	(Scotland) Robert McCoig (England) Margaret Beck	15–9, 15–11	(gold) Winner
1973	All England Open	(England) Derek Talbot	(England) Elliot Stuart (England) Nora Gardner	9–15, 15–13, 15–8	(gold) Winner
1973	Dutch Open	(England) Derek Talbot	(England) Elliot Stuart (England) Nora Gardner	13–15, 15–6, 15–5	(gold) Winner
1973	Swedish Open	(England) Derek Talbot	(England) Elliot Stuart (England) Margaret Beck	15–11, 15–3	(gold) Winner
1974	All England Open	(England) Derek Talbot	(England) David Eddy (England) Susan Whetnall	5–15, 15–7, 10–15	(silver) Runner-up
1976	All England Open	(England) Derek Talbot	(England) Mike Tredgett (England) Nora Gardner	15–9, 15–12	(gold) Winner
1976	Dutch Open	(England) Derek Talbot	(Denmark) Steen Skovgaard (Denmark) Lene Køppen	15–6, 13–15, 15–3	(gold) Winner
1976	Scottish Open	(England) Derek Talbot	(England) Mike Tredgett (England) Nora Gardner	18–17, 15–9	(gold) Winner
1977	All England Open	(England) Derek Talbot	(England) Mike Tredgett (England) Nora Perry	15–9, 15–9	(gold) Winner
1977	Welsh International	(England) Elliot Stuart	(Netherlands) Rob Ridder (Netherlands) Marjan Ridder	15–10, 15–12	(gold) Winner
1977	Dutch Open	(England) Derek Talbot	(Denmark) Steen Skovgaard (Netherlands) Joke van Beusekom	15–7, 15–10	(gold) Winner
1977	Swedish Open	(England) Derek Talbot	(Denmark) Steen Skovgaard (Denmark) Lene Køppen	15–6, 15–9	(gold) Winner
1979	Dutch Open	(England) Derek Talbot	(England) David Eddy (England) Barbara Sutton	15–8, 15–11	(gold) Winner
1981	Bell's Open	(England) Martin Dew	(Scotland) Billy Gilliland (England) Nora Perry	16–17, 10–15	(silver) Runner-up
1981	Canadian Open	(Sweden) Thomas Kihlström	(England) Ray Stevens (England) Nora Perry	12–15, 15–6, 15–0	(gold) Winner
1981	Dutch Open	(Sweden) Thomas Kihlström	(England) Mike Tredgett (England) Nora Perry	15–12, 15–6	(gold) Winner
1981	Scottish Open	(Scotland) Billy Gilliland	(Scotland) Alastair Baker (Scotland) Linda Gardner	15–5, 15–0	(gold) Winner
1982	All England Open	(England) Martin Dew	(Scotland) Billy Gilliland (England) Karen Chapman	15–10, 14–17, 15–7	(gold) Winner
1982	German Open	(England) Dipak Tailor	(Netherlands) Rob Ridder (Netherlands) Marjan Ridder	15–12, 15–7	(gold) Winner
1982	Bell's Open	(Scotland) Billy Gilliland	(England) Ray Stevens (England) Nora Perry	15–11, 7–7 retired	(gold) Winner
1982	Indonesia Open	(England) Martin Dew	(Scotland) Billy Gilliland (England) Karen Chapman	5–15, 15–8, 15–10	(gold) Winner
1982	Dutch Open	(England) Martin Dew	(Denmark) Steen Skovgaard (Denmark) Dorte Kjær	17–14, 14–17, 15–8	(gold) Winner
1982	Scottish Open	(Scotland) Billy Gilliland	(Denmark) Morten Frost (Denmark) Lene Køppen	18–13, 15–9	(gold) Winner
1982	Denmark Open	(England) Martin Dew	(Sweden) Thomas Kihlström (England) Nora Perry	11–15, 9–15	(silver) Runner-up
1982	Victor Cup	(England) Martin Dew	(Sweden) Thomas Kihlström (England) Nora Perry	15–9, 9–15, 9–15	(silver) Runner-up
1983	Dutch Open	(England) Martin Dew	(Denmark) Steen Skovgaard (Denmark) Anne Skovgaard	15–10, 17–16	(gold) Winner
1983	English Masters	(England) Martin Dew	(England) Mike Tredgett (England) Karen Chapman	15–5, 15–8	(gold) Winner
1983	Dutch Masters	(England) Martin Dew	(England) Mike Tredgett (England) Karen Chapman	15–4, 15–10	(gold) Winner
1984	English Masters	(England) Martin Dew	(Scotland) Billy Gilliland (England) Gillian Gowers	18–15, 15–7	(gold) Winner
1984	Welsh International	(England) Martin Dew	(Scotland) Billy Gilliland (England) Karen Chapman	15–10, 7–15, 15–9	(gold) Winner
1986	Welsh International	(England) Martin Dew	(England) Chris Dobson (England) Karen Beckman	15–1, 15–0	(gold) Winner
1987	Welsh International	(England) Martin Dew	(England) Andy Goode (England) Fiona Elliott	15–4, 15–8	(gold) Winner
