= 1972 All England Badminton Championships =

1972 All England Championships
Tournament details
- Dates: 23 March 1972– 26 March 1972
- Edition: 62nd
- Venue: Wembley Arena
- Location: London

The 1972 All England Championships was a badminton tournament held at Wembley Arena, London, England, from 23–26 March 1972.

== Final results ==
Category	Winners	Runners-up	Score
Men's singles	(Indonesia) Rudy Hartono	(Denmark) Svend Pri	15-9, 15-4
Women's singles	(Japan) Noriko Nakayama	(Japan) Hiroe Yuki	11-5, 3-11, 11-7
Men's doubles	(Indonesia) Christian Hadinata & Ade Chandra	(England) Ray Stevens & Mike Tredgett	15-5, 15-12
Women's doubles	(Japan) Machiko Aizawa & Etsuko Takanaka	(England) Margaret Beck & Julie Rickard	9-15, 15-8, 15-12
Mixed doubles	(Denmark) Svend Pri & Ulla Strand	(England) Derek Talbot & Gillian Gilks	12-15, 18-14, 15-2

Noriko Takagi married and became Noriko Nakayama and Brigitte Potthoff married and became Brigitte Steden.

== Men's singles ==
=== Section 1 ===
Round of 32
(Indonesia) Rudy Hartono	15	15
(England) David Eddy	3	4
(Malaysia) Lee Kok Pheng	17	15	15
(West Germany) Torsten Winter	18	10	12
(West Germany) Wolfgang Bochow	15	15
(Scotland) Bob McCoig	0	3
(England) Peter Smith	15	10	15
(England) Colin Beacom	13	15	11
(Sweden) Sture Johnsson	15	15
(Japan) Ippei Kojima	11	8
(United States) Stan Hales	15	15
(West Germany) Roland Maywald	3	5
(Indonesia) Christian Hadinata	15	15
(England) Clive Kirk	7	6
(England) Derek Talbot	15	15
(Sweden) Willy Lund	3	9

Round of 16
(Indonesia) Hartono	15	15
(Malaysia) Kok Pheng	8	1
(West Germany) Bochow	15	15
(England) Smith	1	11
(Sweden) Johnsson	15	15
(United States) Hales	2	1
(Indonesia) Hadinata	15	15
(England) Talbot	10	5

Quarter-finals
(Indonesia) Hartono	15	15
(West Germany) Bochow	7	9
(Sweden) Johnsson	15	15
(Indonesia) Hadinata	6	3

Semi-finals
(Indonesia) Hartono	15	15
(Sweden) Johnsson	3	6

=== Section 2 ===
Round of 32
(Denmark) Svend Andersen Pri	15	15
(Singapore) Lee Kin Tat	5	9
(New Zealand) Richard Purser	15	15
(West Germany) Michael Schnaase	8	4
(Malaysia) Tan Aik Huang	15	15
(Sweden) Kurt Johnsson	2	1
(Thailand) Bandid Jaiyen	15	15
(England) S J Shaw	4	2
(Malaysia) Tan Aik Mong	15	16	15
(Sweden) Thomas Kihlström	7	17	13
(Denmark) Tage Nielsen	15	15
(Malaysia) Peter Goh	7	1
(Indonesia) Muljadi	15	15
(West Germany) Willi Braun	8	11
(England) Ray Stevens	15	15
(Scotland) Nicol McCloy	2	5

Round of 16
(Denmark) Pri	15	15
(New Zealand) Purser	7	11
(Malaysia) Aik Huang	15	5	15
(Thailand) Jaiyen	11	15	7
(Malaysia) Mong	15	15
(Denmark) Nielsen	5	13
(Indonesia) Muljadi	8	15	15
(England) Stevens	15	7	7

Quarter-finals
(Denmark) Pri	15	15
(Malaysia) Aik Huang	9	2
(Malaysia) Mong	9	15	15
(Indonesia) Muljadi	15	8	9

Semi-finals
(Denmark) Pri	15	15
(Malaysia) Mong	2	6

+ Denotes seed

== Women's singles ==
=== Section 1 ===
Round of 32
(Japan) Noriko Nakayama	11	11
(England) Pat Smiles	0	0
(Indonesia) Taty Sumirah	4	11	11
(Denmark) Pernille Kaagaard	11	2	7
(England) Margaret Beck	11	11
(West Germany) Marieluise Wackerow	1	5
(Sweden) Anette Börjesson	w/o	11
(Denmark) Lonny Bostofte
(Denmark) Lene Køppen	11	11
(England) Anne Forrest	0	4
(Australia) Kay Nesbit	11	11	11
(Canada) Barb O'Brien	12	4	4
(Indonesia) Utami Dewi Kurniawan	11	11
(Denmark) Anne Flindt	9	1
=3	(West Germany) Irmgard Gerlatzka	11	11
(Denmark) Ulla Strand	8	8

Round of 16
(Japan) Nakayama	11	11
(Indonesia) Sumirah	5	2
(England) Beck	11	11
(Sweden) Borjesson	3	1
(Denmark) Køppen	7	11	11
(Australia) Nesbit	11	7	3
(Indonesia) Dewi	11	11
(West Germany) Gerlatzka	5	8

Quarter-finals
(Japan) Nakayama	11	11
(England) Beck	9	0
(Denmark) Køppen	11	4	11
(Indonesia) Dewi	8	11	9

Semi-finals
(Japan) Nakayama	11	11
(Denmark) Køppen	4	8

=== Section 2 ===
Round of 32
=3	(Japan) Hiroe Yuki	11	5	11
(England) Gillian Gilks	7	11	6
(Republic of Ireland) Barabara Beckett	11	11
(Canada) Jennifer Dakin	3	4
(Netherlands) Joke Van Beusekom	11	12
(Denmark) Annie Bog Jorgensen	6	9
(Denmark) Bente Sorensen	11	11
(England) L A Spencer	4	1
(Sweden) Eva Twedberg	11	11
(Denmark) Eva Carlsen	1	4
(West Germany) Brigitte Steden	11	11
(Japan) Machiko Aizawa	7	6
(Indonesia) Intan Nurtjahja	11	11
(England) Nora Gardner	1	3
(Denmark) Anne Berglund	11	11
(West Germany) Gerda Schumacher	1	0

Round of 16
(Japan) Yuki	11	11
(Republic of Ireland) Beckett	5	1
(Netherlands) Van Beusekom	11	11
(Denmark) Sorensen	3	1
(Sweden) Twedberg	11	11
(West Germany) Steden	3	2
(Indonesia) Nurtjahja	11	11
(Denmark) Berglund	5	8

Quarter-finals
(Japan) Yuki	12	11
(Netherlands) Van Beusekom	9	5
(Sweden) Twedberg	11	11
(Indonesia) Nurtjahja	7	2

Semi-finals
(Japan) Yuki	11	12
(Sweden) Twedberg	7	11
