= Margaret Beck =

English badminton player (1952–2023)

Personal information
- Nationality: British (English)
- Born: 9 January 1952 Whitehaven, Cumbria, England
- Died: 21 May 2023 (aged 71) Whitehaven, Cumbria, England

Sport
- Sport: Badminton
Medal record
Women's badminton
Representing England
World Championships
Bronze medal – third place	1977 Malmö	Women's singles
Bronze medal – third place	1977 Malmö	Women's doubles
Commonwealth Games
Gold medal – first place	1970 Edinburgh	Women's singles
Gold medal – first place	1974 Christchurch	Women's doubles
Silver medal – second place	1974 Christchurch	Women's singles
European Championships
Bronze medal – third place	1970 Port Talbot	Women's doubles
Gold medal – first place	1972 Karlskrona	Women's singles
Silver medal – second place	1972 Karlskrona	Women's doubles
Gold medal – first place	1974 Vienna	Women's doubles
Bronze medal – third place	1974 Vienna	Women's singles
Silver medal – second place	1976 Dublin	Women's doubles
Bronze medal – third place	1976 Dublin	Women's singles
European Mixed Team Championships
Gold medal – first place	1972 Karlskrona	Mixed team
Gold medal – first place	1974 Vienna	Mixed team
Silver medal – second place	1976 Dublin	Mixed team
European Junior Championships
Silver medal – second place	1969 Leidschendam-Voorburg	Girls' singles
Silver medal – second place	1969 Leidschendam-Voorburg	Girls' doubles
Bronze medal – third place	1969 Leidschendam-Voorburg	Mixed doubles

Margaret Beck (later Margaret Lockwood; 9 January 1952 – 21 May 2023) was a badminton player from England who ranked among the world's best during most of the 1970s.

== Early and personal life ==
Beck was born in Whitehaven, Cumbria. She married Ron Lockwood on 20 December 1975 in near London.

== Playing career ==
An exceptional junior talent, she represented the England team, at the 1970 British Commonwealth Games in Edinburgh, Scotland. She competed in the badminton events, winning a gold medal in the singles, while still in her teens.

In 1973, Beck won the women's singles at the All-England Championships, which, aside from the international team championships (Uber Cup and Thomas Cup), was then the world's most prestigious tournament.

She shared the All-England women's doubles title with Gillian Gilks in 1974. She won singles at the World Invitation Tournament, a forerunner of the BWF World Championships, that was held in Jakarta, Indonesia in 1974. In 1974 she represented England and won a gold and silver medals in the doubles and singles, at the 1974 British Commonwealth Games in Christchurch, New Zealand.

After marrying in 1975 she competed under her married name of Margaret Lockwood and reached the singles and doubles final at the 1976 All England Open Badminton Championships.

Her other international singles titles included the European Badminton Championships (1972), and the Canadian (1975), Irish (1971), Portuguese (1973), Scottish (1972, 1974), and South African (1976) Opens. She also won five English National singles titles (against opposition that included Gillian Gilks), and a dozen or more international doubles titles.

Noted for her rigorous fitness regimen, she developed a problem with her knee which was seriously aggravated during the first World Badminton Championships in 1977. The singles and doubles bronze medals that she earned there would be her last. Despite surgeries and attempted rehabilitation she never played serious competitive badminton again.

== Achievements ==
=== World Championships ===
Women's singles
Year	Venue	Opponent	Score	Result
1977	Malmö Isstadion, Malmö, Sweden	(Denmark) Lene Køppen	6–11, 1–11	Bronze

Women's doubles
Year	Venue	Partner	Opponent	Score	Result
1977	Malmö Isstadion, Malmö, Sweden	(England) Nora Perry	(Netherlands) Marjan Ridder (Netherlands) Joke van Beusekom	15–4, 6–15, 8–15	Bronze

=== Commonwealth Games ===
Women's singles
Year	Venue	Opponent	Score	Result
1970	Edinburgh, Scotland	(England) Gillian Perrin	5–11, 11–3, 11–8	Gold
1974	Cowles Stadium, Christchurch, New Zealand	(England) Gillian Gilks	8–11, 8–11	Silver

Women's doubles
Year	Venue	Partner	Opponent	Score	Result
1974	Cowles Stadium, Christchurch, New Zealand	(England) Gillian Perrin	(England) Margaret Boxall (England) Susan Whetnall	15–7, 15–5	Gold

=== European Championships ===
Women's singles
Year	Venue	Opponent	Score	Result
1972	Karlskrona, Sweden	(England) Gillian Gilks	11–0, 11–1	Gold
1974	Vienna, Austria	(Denmark) Lene Køppen	6–11, 12–10, 7–11	Bronze
1976	Dublin, Ireland	(Denmark) Lene Køppen	5–11, 5–11	Bronze

Women's doubles
Year	Venue	Partner	Opponent	Score	Result
1970	Port Talbot, Wales	(England) Gillian Perrin	(West Germany) Irmgard Latz (West Germany) Marieluise Wackerow	13–15, 15–9, 3–15	Bronze
1972	Karlskrona, Sweden	(England) Julie Rickard	(England) Gillian Gilks (England) Judy Hashman	11–15, 7–15	Silver
1974	Vienna, Austria	(England) Gillian Gilks	(England) Nora Gardner (England) Susan Whetnall	15–10, 15–13	Gold
1976	Dublin, Ireland	(England) Nora Gardner	(England) Gillian Gilks (England) Susan Whetnall	4–15, 8–15	Silver

=== European Junior Championships ===
Girls' singles
Year	Venue	Opponent	Score	Result
1969	Leidschendam-Voorburg, Netherlands	(Denmark) Anne Berglund	11–6, 6–11, 11–12	Silver

Girls' doubles
Year	Venue	Partner	Opponent	Score	Result
1969	Leidschendam-Voorburg, Netherlands	(England) Carol Whightman	(Netherlands) Marjan Luesken (Netherlands) Joke van Beusekom	5–15, 9–15	Silver

Mixed doubles
Year	Venue	Partner	Opponent	Score	Result
1969	Leidschendam-Voorburg, Netherlands	(England) Ray Stevens	(Sweden) Girt Perneklo (Sweden) Karin Lindquist		Bronze

=== International tournaments ===
Women's singles
Year	Tournament	Opponent	Score	Result
1970	Wimbledon Open	(United States) Tyna Barinaga	11–8, 11–1	(gold) Winner
1971	Irish Open	(England) Gillian Gilks	12–9, 10–12, 11–6	(gold) Winner
1971	Swedish Open	(Sweden) Eva Twedberg	7–11, 5–11	(silver) Runner-up
1971	Scottish Open	(England) Gillian Gilks	9–11, 5–11	(silver) Runner-up
1972	Scottish Open	(England) Gillian Gilks	6–11, 11–4, 11–4	(gold) Winner
1973	All England Open	(England) Gillian Gilks	11–8, 11–0	(gold) Winner
1973	Jamaica International	(Sweden) Eva Twedberg	7–11, 11–3, 12–9	(gold) Winner
1973	Portugal International	(Sweden) Eva Twedberg	12–10, 10–12, 11–0	(gold) Winner
1974	German Open	(Netherlands) Joke van Beusekom	11–1, 11–4	(gold) Winner
1974	Scottish Open	(England) Gillian Gilks	11–8, 12–10	(gold) Winner
1975	Canadian Open	(Netherlands) Joke van Beusekom	11–4, 11–3	(gold) Winner
1975	Dutch Open	(England) Gillian Gilks	7–11, 3–11	(silver) Runner-up
1976	All England Open	(England) Gillian Gilks	0–11, 3–11	(silver) Runner-up
1976	Canadian Open	(Canada) Wendy Clarkson	11–2, 5–11, 10–12	(silver) Runner-up
1976	Scottish Open	(England) Gillian Gilks	11–6, 4–11, 7–11	(silver) Runner-up
1977	German Open	(West Germany) Brigitte Steden	11–7, 11–3	(gold) Winner

Women's doubles
Year	Tournament	Partner	Opponent	Score	Result
1970	Wimbledon Open	(England) Julie Rickard	(United States) Tyna Barinaga (England) Nora Gardner	6–15, 7–15	(silver) Runner-up
1971	Irish Open	(England) Julie Rickard	(England) Gillian Gilks (England) Nora Gardner	15–12, 15–9	(gold) Winner
1971	Scottish Open	(England) Gillian Gilks	(Republic of Ireland) Barbara Beckett (Australia) Kay Nesbit	15–6, 15–7	(gold) Winner
1972	Swedish Open	(England) Gillian Gilks	(Denmark) Anne Flindt (Denmark) Pernille Kaagaard	15–8, 15–8	(gold) Winner
1972	All England Open	(England) Julie Rickard	(Japan) Machiko Aizawa (Japan) Etsuko Takenaka	15–9, 8–15, 12–15	(silver) Runner-up
1972	Scottish Open	(England) Helen Horton	(England) Bridget Cooper (England) Gillian Gilks	15–17, 6–15	(silver) Runner-up
1973	Swedish Open	(England) Gillian Gilks	(Netherlands) Marjan Luesken (Netherlands) Joke van Beusekom	15–8, 15–8	(gold) Winner
1973	All England Open	(England) Gillian Gilks	(Japan) Machiko Aizawa (Japan) Etsuko Takenaka	10–15, 15–10, 11–15	(silver) Runner-up
1973	Canadian Open	(Netherlands) Joke van Beusekom	(Canada) Mimi Nilsson (Canada) Judi Rollick	15–12, 15–12	(gold) Winner
1973	Jamaica International	(England) Bridget Cooper	(Canada) Jennifer Dakin (Canada) Barb O'Brien	15–8, 2–15, 15–12	(gold) Winner
1974	All England Open	(England) Gillian Gilks	(England) Margaret Boxall (England) Susan Whetnall	15–5, 18–14	(gold) Winner
1974	German Open	(England) Gillian Gilks	(West Germany) Brigitte Steden (West Germany) Marieluise Zizmann	15–12, 12–15, 15–6	(gold) Winner
1974	Scottish Open	(England) Gillian Gilks	(England) Margaret Boxall (England) Susan Whetnall	9–15, 15–10, 10–15	(silver) Runner-up
1975	Canadian Open	(Netherlands) Joke van Beusekom	(Canada) Barbara Welch (Canada) Jane Youngberg	12–15, 15–11, 15–4	(gold) Winner
1975	Dutch Open	(England) Gillian Gilks	(England) Nora Gardner (England) Susan Whetnall	12–15, 17–14, 7–15	(silver) Runner-up
1976	All England Open	(England) Nora Gardner	(England) Gillian Gilks (England) Susan Whetnall	10–15, 10–15	(silver) Runner-up
1976	Canadian Open	(England) Nora Gardner	(Netherlands) Marjan Ridder (Netherlands) Joke van Beusekom	17–14, 15–9	(gold) Winner
1976	Scottish Open	(England) Nora Gardner	(England) Gillian Gilks (England) Susan Whetnall	5–15, 2–15	(silver) Runner-up
1976	Swedish Open	(England) Gillian Gilks	(Netherlands) Marjan Ridder (Netherlands) Joke van Beusekom	15–11, 15–4	(gold) Winner
1977	All England Open	(England) Nora Perry	(Japan) Etsuko Toganoo (Japan) Emiko Ueno	15–7, 3–15, 7–15	(silver) Runner-up

Mixed doubles
Year	Tournament	Partner	Opponent	Score	Result
1972	Scottish Open	(Scotland) Robert McCoig	(England) Derek Talbot (England) Gillian Gilks	9–15, 11–15	(silver) Runner-up
1973	Jamaica International	(England) Mike Tredgett	(Sweden) Sture Johnsson (Sweden) Eva Twedberg	3–15, 15–18	(silver) Runner-up
1973	Swedish Open	(England) Elliot Stuart	(England) Derek Talbot (England) Gillian Gilks	11–15, 3–15	(silver) Runner-up
