= 1972 European Badminton Championships =

Tournament details
- Dates: 14–16 April
- Edition: 3
- Venue: Karlskrona Idrottshall
- Location: Karlskrona, Sweden

The 3rd European Badminton Championships were held in Karlskrona, Sweden, between 14 and 16 April 1972, and hosted by the European Badminton Union and the Svenska Badmintonförbundet.

== Medalists ==
Event	Gold	Silver	Bronze
Men's singles	(West Germany) Wolfgang Bochow	(Denmark) Klaus Kaagaard	(England) Ray Stevens
Men's singles	(West Germany) Wolfgang Bochow	(Denmark) Klaus Kaagaard	(Denmark) Flemming Delfs
Women's singles	(England) Margaret Beck	(England) Gillian Gilks	(Sweden) Eva Twedberg
Women's singles	(England) Margaret Beck	(England) Gillian Gilks	(Netherlands) Joke van Beusekom
Men's doubles	(West Germany) Willi Braun and Roland Maywald	(England) Derek Talbot and Elliot Stuart	(Denmark) Erland Kops and Elo Hansen
Men's doubles	(West Germany) Willi Braun and Roland Maywald	(England) Derek Talbot and Elliot Stuart	(West Germany) Wolfgang Bochow and Gerhard Kucki
Women's doubles	(England) Gillian Gilks and Judy Hashman	(England) Margaret Beck and Julie Rickard	(Denmark) Anne Flindt and Pernille Kaagaard
Women's doubles	(England) Gillian Gilks and Judy Hashman	(England) Margaret Beck and Julie Rickard	(Denmark) Annie Bøg Jørgensen and Lene Køppen
Mixed doubles	(England) Derek Talbot and Gillian Gilks	(West Germany) Wolfgang Bochow and Marieluise Wackerow	(West Germany) Roland Maywald and Brigitte Steden
Mixed doubles	(England) Derek Talbot and Gillian Gilks	(West Germany) Wolfgang Bochow and Marieluise Wackerow	(Sweden) Gert Perneklo and Eva Twedberg
Teams	England	Denmark	West Germany

== Results ==
=== Semi-finals ===
Category	Winner	Runner-up	Score
Men's singles	(West Germany) Wolfgang Bochow	(England) Ray Stevens	15–4, 15–4
Men's singles	(Denmark) Klaus Kaagaard	(Denmark) Flemming Delfs	18–13, 8–15, 15–7
Women's singles	(England) Gillian Gilks	(Sweden) Eva Twedberg	11–2, 11–7
Women's singles	(England) Margaret Beck	(Netherlands) Joke van Beusekom	11–2, 11–1
Men's doubles	(West Germany) Roland Maywald (West Germany) Willi Braun	(Denmark) Elo Hansen (Denmark) Erland Kops	15–13, 15–8
Men's doubles	(England) Derek Talbot (England) Elliot Stuart	(West Germany) Gerhard Kucki (West Germany) Wolfgang Bochow	Walkover
Women's doubles	(England) Judy Hashman (England) Gillian Gilks	(Denmark) Anne Flindt (Denmark) Pernille Kaagaard	15–5, 15–10
Women's doubles	(England) Julie Rickard (England) Margaret Beck	(Denmark) Annie Bøg Jørgensen (Denmark) Lene Køppen	15–9, 15–7
Mixed doubles	(England) Derek Talbot (England) Gillian Gilks	(West Germany) Roland Maywald (West Germany) Brigitte Steden	15–1, 15–9
Mixed doubles	(West Germany) Wolfgang Bochow (West Germany) Marieluise Wackerow	(Sweden) Gert Perneklo (Sweden) Eva Twedberg	15–11, 15–8

=== Finals ===
Category	Winners	Runners-up	Score
Men's singles	(West Germany) Wolfgang Bochow	(Denmark) Klaus Kaagaard	15–5, 15–2
Women's singles	(England) Margaret Beck	(England) Gillian Gilks	11–0, 11–1
Men's doubles	(West Germany) Roland Maywald (West Germany) Willi Braun	(England) Derek Talbot (England) Elliot Stuart	15–11, 18–15
Women's doubles	(England) Judy Hashman (England) Gillian Gilks	(England) Julie Rickard (England) Margaret Beck	15–11, 15–7
Mixed doubles	(England) Derek Talbot (England) Gillian Gilks	(West Germany) Wolfgang Bochow (West Germany) Marieluise Wackerow	15–6, 15–4

== Medal account ==
* Host nation (Sweden)

Rank	Nation	Gold	Silver	Bronze	Total
1	England	4	3	1	8
2	West Germany	2	1	3	6
3	Denmark	0	2	4	6
4	Sweden*	0	0	2	2
5	Netherlands	0	0	1	1
Totals (5 entries)		6	6	11	23
