= Julie Rickard =

English badminton player

Personal information
- Nationality: British (English)
- Born: Julie Charles; 1939 (age 86–87) Surrey, England

Sport
- Sport: Badminton
Medal record
Women's badminton
Representing England
Commonwealth Games
Silver medal – second place	1970 Edinburgh	Women's doubles
European Championships
Silver medal – second place	1972 Karlskrona	Women's doubles
European Mixed Team Championships
Gold medal – first place	1972 Karlskrona	Mixed team

Julie E. Rickard (née Julie Charles, born 1939) is a retired female badminton player from England.

== Career ==
Born Julie Charles, she won the 1958 & 1964 French Open, the 1958 Swiss Open and was English National champion in the doubles in 1966. She married in 1969 and competed in her married name thereafter.

Rickard represented the England team at the 1970 British Commonwealth Games in Edinburgh, Scotland. She competed in the badminton events, winning a silver medal in the women's doubles.

She also reached the doubles final in the prestigious All England Open Badminton Championships, in 1970 and 1972.

== Achievements ==
=== Commonwealth Games ===
Women's doubles
Year	Venue	Partner	Opponent	Score	Result
1970	Meadowbank Stadium, Edinburgh, Scotland	(England) Gillian Perrin	(England) Margaret Boxall (England) Susan Whetnall	9–15, 2–15	Silver

=== European Championships ===
Women's doubles
Year	Venue	Partner	Opponent	Score	Result
1972	Karlskrona Idrottshall, Karlskrona, Sweden	(England) Margaret Beck	(England) Gillian Gilks (England) Judy Hashman	11–15, 7–15	Silver

=== International tournaments (12 titles, 9 runners-up) ===
Women's singles
Year	Tournament	Opponent	Score	Result
1958	Swiss Open	(France) Noëlle Ailloud	11–1, 12–11	(gold) Winner
1967	Welsh International	(England) Anita Price	11–2, 11–4	(gold) Winner
1969	French Open	(Denmark) Anne Mette Sørensen	11–5, 11–3	(gold) Winner

Women's doubles
Year	Tournament	Partner	Opponent	Score	Result
1958	French Open	(Thailand) Pratuang Pattabongse	(Sweden) Beryl Olsson (Sweden) Ingrid Dahlberg	18–13, 15–8	(gold) Winner
1964	French Open	(Netherlands) Imre Rietveld	(Belgium) Bep Verstoep (Belgium) June van der Willigen	15–2, 15–8	(gold) Winner
1966	French Open	(Netherlands) Imre Rietveld	(England) J. Davy (England) Angela Lindsay	15–12, 15–5	(gold) Winner
1967	French Open	(Netherlands) Imre Rietveld	(West Germany) Gerda Schumacher (West Germany) Gudrun Ziebold	14–17, 15–10, 15–8	(gold) Winner
1967	Welsh International	(Wales) Angela Dickson	(Wales) Betty Fisher (Wales) M. Withers	15–6, 12–15, 18–13	(gold) Winner
1969	French Open	(New Zealand) Alison Glenie	(Denmark) Anne Mette Sørensen (Denmark) Lene Horvid	15–6, 15–4	(gold) Winner
1970	All England Open	(England) Gillian Perrin	(England) Margaret Boxall (England) Susan Whetnall	6–15, 15–8, 9–15	(silver) Runner-up
1970	Wimbledon Open	(England) Margaret Beck	(United States) Tyna Barinaga (England) Nora Gardner	6–15, 7–15	(silver) Runner-up
1971	Irish Open	(England) Margaret Beck	(England) Gillian Gilks (England) Nora Gardner	15–12, 15–9	(gold) Winner
1972	All England Open	(England) Margaret Beck	(Japan) Machiko Aizawa (Japan) Etsuko Takenaka	15–9, 8–15, 12–15	(silver) Runner-up

Mixed doubles
Year	Tournament	Partner	Opponent	Score	Result
1958	Swiss Open	(Switzerland) Jean Mermod	(Netherlands) Bob Loo (France) Noëlle Ailloud	8–15, 15–13, 6–15	(silver) Runner-up
1964	French Open	(Malaysia) Oon Chong Jin	(Denmark) Jørgen Herlevsen (Netherlands) Henriette Ernst	15–3, 15–1	(gold) Winner
1966	Dutch Open	(England) Paul Whetnall	(England) David Horton (England) Jenny Horton	3–15, 4–15	(silver) Runner-up
1967	Welsh International	(England) Roger Mills	(Wales) Peter Seaman (Wales) Betty Fisher	15–3, 15–9	(gold) Winner
1968	French Open	(West Germany) Torsten Winter	(Netherlands) Herman Leidelmeijer (Netherlands) Lily ter Metz	15–6, 4–15, 8–15	(silver) Runner-up
1969	French Open	(West Germany) Torsten Winter	(Denmark) Elo Hansen (Denmark) Lene Horvid	9–15, 17–14, 7–15	(silver) Runner-up
1970	Wimbledon Open	(England) Keith Andrews	(Scotland) Robert McCoig (United States) Tyna Barinaga	1–15, 7–15	(silver) Runner-up
1971	Irish Open	(England) Roger Mills	(England) Derek Talbot (England) Gillian Gilks	4–15, 9–15	(silver) Runner-up

== Personal life ==
She married in 1969 and afterwards competed as Julie Rickard.
