= Machiko Aizawa =

Japanese badminton player

Sport
- Country: Japan
- Sport: Badminton
Medal record
Women's badminton
Representing Japan
Uber Cup
Gold medal – first place	1972 Tokyo	Women's team
Silver medal – second place	1975 Jakarta	Women's team
Asian Games
Gold medal – first place	1970 Bangkok	Women's doubles
Gold medal – first place	1970 Bangkok	Women's team
Bronze medal – third place	1974 Tehran	Women's team

Machiko Aizawa (相沢 マチ子, Aizawa Machiko) is a former badminton player from Japan who won Japanese national and major international titles from the late 1960s to the mid-1970s.

Though highly competitive in singles, Machiko's greatest success came in women's doubles with Etsuko Takenaka Toganoo. They shared the prestigious All-England Championships in 1972, 1973, and 1975. They won the Danish Open women's doubles title in 1970 and 1974, the quadrennial Asian Games championship in 1970, and the U.S. Open women's doubles title, on their only try, in 1970. Aizawa played on Japan's 1972 Uber Cup (women's international) team which retained the world championship, and its 1975 team which lost the title to Indonesia.

== Achievements ==
=== Asian Games ===
Women's doubles
Year	Venue	Partner	Opponent	Score	Result
1970	Kittikachorn Stadium, Bangkok, Thailand	(Japan) Etsuko Takenaka	(Indonesia) Retno Kustijah (Indonesia) Nurhaena	15–11, 15–6	Gold

=== International tournaments (7 titles, 3 runners-up) ===
Women's doubles
Year	Tournament	Partner	Opponent	Score	Result
1968	Malaysia Open	(Japan) Etsuko Takenaka	(Japan) Noriko Takagi (Japan) Hiroe Yuki	15–11, 15–10	(gold) Winner
1970	Denmark Open	(Japan) Etsuko Takenaka	(Japan) Hiroe Amano (Japan) Noriko Takagi	15–17, 15–12, 15–9	(gold) Winner
1970	U.S. Open	(Japan) Etsuko Takenaka	(England) Susan Whetnall (England) Margaret Boxall	15–10, 15–11	(gold) Winner
1971	Denmark Open	(Japan) Etsuko Takenaka	(Japan) Noriko Takagi (Japan) Hiroe Yuki	10–15, 3–15	(silver) Runner-up
1972	Denmark Open	(Japan) Etsuko Takenaka	(Japan) Noriko Takagi (Japan) Hiroe Yuki	11–15, 15–11, 15–17	(silver) Runner-up
1972	All England Open	(Japan) Etsuko Takenaka	(England) Margaret Beck (England) Julie Rickard	9–15, 15–8, 15–12	(gold) Winner
1973	All England Open	(Japan) Etsuko Takenaka	(England) Margaret Beck (England) Gillian Gilks	15–10, 10–15, 15–11	(gold) Winner
1974	Denmark Open	(Japan) Etsuko Takenaka	(Denmark) Pernille Kaagaard (Denmark) Ulla Strand	18–15, 15–12	(gold) Winner
1975	All England Open	(Japan) Etsuko Takenaka	(Indonesia) Theresia Widiastuti (Indonesia) Imelda Wiguna	15–11, 17–14	(gold) Winner

Mixed doubles
Year	Tournament	Partner	Opponent	Score	Result
1970	US Open	(Japan) Ippei Kojima	(England) Paul Whetnall (England) Margaret Boxall	8–15, 2–15	(silver) Runner-up

=== Invitational tournament ===
Women's doubles
Year	Tournament	Partner	Opponent	Score	Result
1974 (Glasgow)	World Invitational Championships	(Japan) Etsuko Takenaka	(England) Margaret Beck (England) Nora Perry	15–7, 15–8	Gold
