= Brigitte Steden =

German badminton player

Personal information
- Born: 16 March 1949 Wuppertal, North Rhine-Westphalia, West Germany
- Died: 14 April 1999 (aged 50) Bochum, North Rhine-Westphalia, Germany

Sport
- Country: Germany
- Sport: Badminton
- Handedness: Right
- Event: Singles and Doubles
Medal record
Women's badminton
Representing West Germany
European Championships
Bronze medal – third place	1972 Karlskrona	Mixed doubles
Bronze medal – third place	1972 Karlskrona	Mixed team

Brigitte Gertrud Steden (16 March 1949 – 14 April 1999), also known as Brigitte Potthoff and Brigitte Pickartz, was a badminton player from Germany. Brigitte won a bronze medal in 1972 Munich Olympics when Badminton was played as a demonstration sport. She also won medals at the European Championships and is a winner of several other international tournaments in Germany, Netherlands, France, Switzerland and Sweden. Her most notable achievements include runner-up performance at the 1975 All England Open.

== Achievements ==
=== Olympic Games (demonstration) ===
Mixed doubles

Year	Venue	Partner	Opponent	Score	Result
1972	Volleyballhalle, Munich, West Germany	(West Germany) Roland Maywald	(United Kingdom) Derek Talbot (United Kingdom) Gillian Gilks	10–15, 8–15	Bronze

=== European Championships ===
Mixed doubles

Year	Venue	Partner	Opponent	Score	Result
1972	Karlskrona Idrottshall, Karlskrona, Sweden	(West Germany) Roland Maywald	(England) Derek Talbot (England) Gillian Gilks	1–15, 9–15	Bronze

=== International tournaments ===
Women's singles

Year	Tournament	Opponent	Score	Result
1969	Swiss Open	(Belgium) June Jacques	11–5, 11–2	(gold) Winner
1971	French Open	(West Germany) Gerda Schumacher	11–1, 1–11, 11–6	(gold) Winner
1975	German Open	(Netherlands) Joke van Beusekom	7–11, 11–3, 4–11	(silver) Runner-up
1977	German Open	(England) Margaret Lockwood	7–11, 3–11	(silver) Runner-up

Women's doubles

Year	Tournament	Partner	Opponent	Score	Result
1969	Swiss Open	(Belgium) June Jacques	(Switzerland) Josée Carrel (Switzerland) Vreni Schkölzinger	15–12, 15–10	(gold) Winner
1971	French Open	(Belgium) June Jacques	(West Germany) Antonie Schwabe (West Germany) Karin Schäfers	5–15, 15–9, 15–11	(gold) Winner
1974	Swedish Open	(West Germany) Marieluise Zizmann	(England) Barbara Giles (England) Heather Nielsen	15–6, 13–15, 10–15	(silver) Runner-up
1974	Dutch Open	(West Germany) Marieluise Zizmann	(Sweden) Anette Börjesson (Sweden) Eva Stuart	15–6, 15–10	(gold) Winner
1974	German Open	(West Germany) Marieluise Zizmann	(England) Gillian Gilks (England) Margaret Beck	12–15, 15–12, 6–15	(silver) Runner-up
1975	German Open	(West Germany) Marieluise Zizmann	(Netherlands) Joke van Beusekom (Netherlands) Marjan Luesken	7–15, 15–11, 15–0	(gold) Winner
1977	Czechoslovakian International	(West Germany) Marieluise Zizmann	(East Germany) Angela Michalowski (East Germany) Monika Cassens	10–15, 12–15	(silver) Runner-up
1980	Victor Cup	(West Germany) Elke Weber	(England) Jane Webster (England) Nora Perry	5–15, 5–15	(silver) Runner-up

Mixed doubles

Year	Tournament	Partner	Opponent	Score	Result
1971	French Open	(West Germany) Klaus Steden	(West Germany) Heinz-Jürgen Fischer (West Germany) Karin Schäfers	15–10, 15–7	(gold) Winner
1972	Dutch Open	(West Germany) Roland Maywald	(West Germany) Wolfgang Bochow (West Germany) Marieluise Zizmann	walkover	(gold) Winner
1974	Swedish Open	(West Germany) Roland Maywald	(Denmark) Henning Borch (Denmark) Ulla Strand	15–7, 15–6	(gold) Winner
1974	Dutch Open	(West Germany) Roland Maywald	(West Germany) Wolfgang Bochow (West Germany) Marieluise Zizmann	15–7, 11–15, 15–12	(gold) Winner
1974	German Open	(West Germany) Roland Maywald	(West Germany) Wolfgang Bochow (West Germany) Marieluise Zizmann	15–11, 15–6	(gold) Winner
1975	All England Open	(West Germany) Roland Maywald	(England) Elliot Stuart (England) Nora Gardner	9–15, 3–15	(silver) Runner-up
1977	Czechoslovakian International	(West Germany) Roland Maywald	(Netherlands) Rob Ridder (Netherlands) Marjan Ridder	10–15, 9–15	(silver) Runner-up
