= Wendy Clarkson =

Canadian badminton player

Personal information
- Born: March 11, 1956 Glasgow, Scotland
- Died: November 13, 2024 (aged 68)

Sport
- Country: Canada
- Sport: Badminton
Medal record
Women's badminton
Representing Canada
Commonwealth Games
| Silver medal – second place | 1978 Edmonton | Mixed team |
| Bronze medal – third place | 1978 Edmonton | Women's singles |
Pan American Championships
| Gold medal – first place | 1977 Moncton | Women's singles |

Wendy May Clarkson Carter (née Wendy Clarkson; 11 March 1956 – 13 November 2024) was a Canadian badminton champion who was ranked third in the world in 1978 and also medalled or ranked at the Canadian Open, national, Commonwealth Games and Pan Am Games. Even though she writes using her left hand, she holds the racket with her right hand.

== Career ==
Carter won her first single Canadian title in the women's singles in 1976, having been a junior champion the year before. That year, she also won the Canadian Open. In 1977, she competed in the quarter-finals of All England. As a high school athlete in Edmonton, Alberta, at Strathcona Composite High School, she was recognized for her prowess in badminton as Athlete of the Year. In the 1960s, she took up badminton. She won the 1975 Canadian junior badminton singles title. With Tracey Vanwassenhove, she won the junior girls' doubles competition. With Cam Dalgleish, she won the mixed doubles in the Open National Badminton Championships.

In 1976, she won the Canadian Ladies' Singles title. The next year, she won the Badminton Pan Am Championship. During the 1978 Commonwealth Games in Edmonton, Alberta, she won silver in the team competition and bronze in the ladies' singles. That year, she was ranked as the 3rd-best female badminton player in the world. In 1979, and 1980, she won top ladies' singles at the nationals and, with Claire Backhouse, she won top Doubles and, with Greg Carter, top mixed doubles. In 1981, she won gold in Ladies' Doubles with Sandra Skillings. In 1982, she earned top Doubles with Bob MacDougal and top ladies doubles with Sandra Skillings.

Carter worked as head coach at the Seattle Badminton Club in Kirkland, Washington when they opened their new location in December 2010. She was a co-founder of the club.

As of June 2023, Carter has been inducted into the Badminton Canada Hall of Fame.

== Education ==
She earned a Bachelor of Education from the University of Calgary in 1989. In 2001, she was inducted into the University of Alberta's Sports Hall of Fame.

== Achievements ==
Notes

| Year | Event | Category | Place | Name |
|---|---|---|---|---|
| 1975 | Canada: Junior Championship | Ladies single | 1 | Wendy Clarkson, AB |
| 1976 | Canada: individual championships | Ladies single | 1 | Wendy Clarkson, AB |
| 1976 | Canada: International Championships | Ladies single | 1 | Wendy Clarkson |
| 1977 | Kanada: International Championships | Ladies single | 1 | Wendy Clarkson |
| 1977 | World Championship | Mixed | 5 | Lucio Fabris / Wendy Clarkson |
| 1978 | Canada: International Championships | Ladies single | 1 | Wendy Clarkson |
| 1978 | Canada: International Championships | Mixed | 1 | Steen Skovgaard / Wendy Clarkson |
| 1978 | Canada: individual championships | Mixed | 1 | Greg Carter / Wendy Clarkson |
| 1978 | Commonwealth Games | Ladies Singles | 2 | Wendy Clarkson |
| 1979 | Canada: individual championships | Mixed | 1 | Greg Carter / Wendy Clarkson |
| 1979 | Canada: individual championships | Women's doubles | 1 | Wendy Carter / Claire Backhouse |
| 1979 | Canada: individual championships | Ladies single | 1 | Wendy Carter, AB |
| 1980 | Canada: individual championships | Ladies single | 1 | Wendy Carter, AB |
| 1982 | Canada: individual championships | Mixed | 1 | Bob MacDougall / Wendy Carter |
