= Eva Twedberg =

Swedish badminton player (born 1943)

Personal information
- Born: Eva Pettersson; 16 February 1943 (age 83) Ystad, Sweden
- Years active: 1959–1986
- Height: 163 cm (5 ft 4 in)
- Weight: 55 kg (121 lb)

Sport
- Country: Sweden
- Sport: Badminton
- Coached by: Bertil Johnsson

Women's singles
- Career titles: All England (1968, 1971); European Champion (1970)
- Highest ranking: 1 (1968–1971)
Medal record
Women's badminton
Representing Sweden
European Championships
Gold medal – first place	1970 Port Talbot	Women's singles
Bronze medal – third place	1968 Bochum	Women's singles
Bronze medal – third place	1972 Karlskrona	Women's singles
Bronze medal – third place	1972 Karlskrona	Mixed doubles

Eva Twedberg (earlier Eva Pettersson, later Eva Stuart, born 16 February 1943) is a Swedish badminton player who won women's singles at numerous international championships. Noted for her stamina and swift court coverage, her peak years were the late 1960s and the early 1970s. Among other titles, she won the World Invitational Championships held in Glasgow, in 1971 in both singles and doubles, the prestigious All-England singles title in 1968 and 1971; the Danish Open in 1968, 1970, and 1972; the U.S. Open in 1972 and 1973; and the European Championships in 1970. Twedberg is the most successful player in the history of the Swedish National Championships with a combined total of 44 titles in national restricted and national open competition earned between 1960 and 1976.

== Personal life ==
During the latter part of her badminton career, Twedberg married the Northumberland county and England badminton internationalist Elliot Stuart and represented Northumberland. Their marriage was held in Newcastle upon Tyne on 18 August 1973. The two living in North London. She gave birth her son Kristian on 6 December 1974 in Cheshire in the North of England.

== Achievements ==
=== European Championships ===
Women's singles
Year	Venue	Opponent	Score	Result
1968	Ruhrlandhalle, Bochum, West Germany	(West Germany) Marieluise Wackerow	11–5, 10–12, 0–11	Bronze
1970	Afan Lido, Port Talbot, Wales	(Denmark) Imre Nielsen	11–8, 10–12, 12–10	Gold
1972	Karlskrona Idrottshall, Karlskrona, Sweden	(England) Gillian Gilks	2–11, 7–11	Bronze

Mixed doubles
Year	Venue	Partner	Opponent	Score	Result
1972	Karlskrona Idrottshall, Karlskrona, Sweden	(Sweden) Gert Perneklo	(West Germany) Wolfgang Bochow (West Germany) Marieluise Wackerow	11–15, 8–15	Bronze

=== International tournaments ===
Women's singles
Year	Tournament	Opponent	Score	Result
1960	German Open	(Denmark) Karin Rasmussen	4–11, 11–1, 11–5	(gold) Winner
1960	Swedish Open	(Sweden) Berit Olsson	6–11, 11–9, 12–10	(gold) Winner
1963	Norwegian International	(Denmark) Lizbeth von Barnekow	3–11, 2–11	(silver) Runner-up
1964	Norwegian International	(Denmark) Pernille Mølgaard Hansen	2–11, 11–3, 6–11	(silver) Runner-up
1965	Swedish Open	(Denmark) Ulla Rasmussen	2–11, 11–1, 11–4	(gold) Winner
1965	Norwegian International	(Denmark) Pernille Mølgaard Hansen	11–8, 11–2	(gold) Winner
1966	Swedish Open	(United States) Judy Hashman	0–11, 0–11	(silver) Runner-up
1966	German Open	(West Germany) Irmgard Latz	8–11, 11–8, 9–12	(silver) Runner-up
1967	German Open	(Denmark) Ulla Strand	11–2, 11–6	(gold) Winner
1967	Norwegian International	(Denmark) Ulla Strand	3–11, 11–8, 11–3	(gold) Winner
1967	North of Scotland International	(Scotland) Muriel Woodcock	11–1, 11–0	(gold) Winner
1968	All England Open	(Indonesia) Minarni	11–6, 11–2	(gold) Winner
1968	German Open	(West Germany) Irmgard Latz	11–6, 9–11, 11–3	(gold) Winner
1968	Swedish Open	(Denmark) Ulla Strand	11–2, 11–0	(gold) Winner
1968	Malaysia Open	(Japan) Hiroe Yuki	1–11, 6–11	(silver) Runner-up
1968	Norwegian International	(Denmark) Jette Føge	10–12, 11–3, 11–5	(gold) Winner
1968	Denmark Open	(Japan) Noriko Takagi	12–9, 9–11, 12–10	(gold) Winner
1968	French Open	(Netherlands) Agnes Geene	11–2, 11–0	(gold) Winner
1968	East of Scotland International	(Sweden) Marianne Flykt	11–1, 11–0	(gold) Winner
1969	German Open	(Denmark) Anne Flindt	6–11, 4–11	(silver) Runner-up
1969	Canadian Open	(Indonesia) Retno Kustijah	11–1, 11–2	(gold) Winner
1969	Norwegian International	(Denmark) Jette Føge	11–4, 11–1	(gold) Winner
1970	Swedish Open	(Denmark) Jette Føge	11–2, 5–11, 11–2	(gold) Winner
1970	Denmark Open	(Japan) Etsuko Takenaka	11–2, 11–2	(gold) Winner
1970	Belgian International	(Denmark) Imre Rietveld Nielsen	10–12, 11–7, 10–12	(silver) Runner-up
1971	Swedish Open	(England) Margaret Beck	11–7, 11–5	(gold) Winner
1971	All England Open	(Denmark) Anne Berglund	11–3, 6–11, 11–2	(gold) Winner
1971	German Open	(West Germany) Irmgard Gerlatzka	11–3, 11–4	(gold) Winner
1971	Dutch Open	(England) Gillian Gilks	11–3, 7–11, 12–11	(gold) Winner
1971	Norwegian International	(Denmark) Lene Køppen	11–5, 11–2	(gold) Winner
1972	Swedish Open	(West Germany) Irmgard Gerlatzka	11–5, 12–10	(gold) Winner
1972	Dutch Open	(West Germany) Irmgard Gerlatzka	11–6, 10–12, 1–5 discontinued	(gold) Winner
1972	German Open	(West Germany) Irmgard Gerlatzka	11–6, 11–4	(gold) Winner
1972	U. S. Open	(United States) Pam Stockton	11–7, 11–8	(gold) Winner
1972	Canadian Open	(Denmark) Anne Berglund	11–7, 11–2	(gold) Winner
1972	Denmark Open	(Japan) Noriko Nakayama	11–4, 11–6	(gold) Winner
1972	Norwegian International	(Denmark) Pernille Kaagaard	6–11, 11–5, 11–0	(gold) Winner
1973	German Open	(Denmark) Imre Rietveld Nielsen	11–7, 11–8	(gold) Winner
1973	India Open	(Denmark) Lene Køppen	8–11, 11–8, 11–7	(gold) Winner
1973	U. S. Open	(Canada) Barb O'Brien	11–6, 11–1	(gold) Winner
1973	Swedish Open	(England) Margaret Beck	11–3, 11–5	(gold) Winner
1973	Jamaica International	(England) Margaret Beck	11–7, 3–11, 9–12	(silver) Runner-up
1974	Swedish Open	(Denmark) Lene Køppen	9–11, 8–11	(silver) Runner-up
1974	Dutch Open	(Netherlands) Joke van Beusekom	7–11, 11–0, 11–9	(gold) Winner
1980	Portugal International	(England) Kathleen Redhead	11–5, 11–6	(gold) Winner
1981	Portugal International	(England) Catharine Troke	6–11, 11–8, 6–11	(silver) Runner-up
1982	Portugal International	(England) Catharine Troke	8–11, 4–11	(silver) Runner-up
1984	Portugal International	(England) Fiona Elliott	7–11, 6–11	(silver) Runner-up
1986	Portugal International	(France) Corinne Sonnet	11–1, 12–10	(gold) Winner

Women's doubles
Year	Tournament	Partner	Opponent	Score	Result
1964	Norwegian International	(Sweden) Gunilla Dahlström	(Denmark) Pernille Mølgaard Hansen (Denmark) Liselotte Nielsen	15–7, 6–15, 15–8	(gold) Winner
1965	Swedish Open	(Sweden) Gunilla Dahlström	(Denmark) Karin Jørgensen (Denmark) Ulla Strand	1–15, 4–15	(silver) Runner-up
1965	Norwegian International	(Sweden) Gunilla Dahlström	(Denmark) Lonny Funch (Denmark) Pernille Mølgaard Hansen	7–15, 14–17	(silver) Runner-up
1966	Swedish Open	(United States) Judy Hashman	(Denmark) Karin Jørgensen (Denmark) Ulla Strand	12–15, 15–10, 15–8	(gold) Winner
1967	Swedish Open	(Netherlands) Imre Rietveld	(Denmark) Lonny Funch (Denmark) Ulla Strand	9–15, 4–15	(silver) Runner-up
1967	Norwegian International	(Sweden) Gittan Nyberg	(Denmark) Ulla Strand (Denmark) Lizbeth von Barnekow	1–15, 8–15	(silver) Runner-up
1968	Singapore Open	(Malaysia) Rosalind Singha Ang	(Japan) Hiroe Yuki (Japan) Noriko Takagi	6–15, 11–15	(silver) Runner-up
1968	French Open	(West Germany) Karin Dittberner	(West Germany) Lore Hawig (West Germany) Gerda Schumacher	15–8, 15–11	(gold) Winner
1968	Norwegian International	(Sweden) Ann-Christine Rosenquist	(Denmark) Jette Føge (Denmark) Lonny Funch	3–15, 4–15	(silver) Runner-up
1969	Norwegian International	(Sweden) Lena Olsson	(Denmark) Jette Føge (Denmark) Karin Jørgensen	4–15, 4–15	(silver) Runner-up
1972	Norwegian International	(Sweden) Anette Börjesson	(Denmark) Anne Flindt (Denmark) Pernille Kaagaard	10–15, 10–15	(silver) Runner-up
1973	India Open	(Netherlands) Joke van Beusekom	(Denmark) Anne Berglund (Denmark) Lene Køppen	15–1, 15–9	(gold) Winner
1973	U. S. Open	(England) Bridget Cooper	(United States) Pam Brady (United States) Diane Hales	15–12, 12–15, 13–18	(silver) Runner-up
1974	Dutch Open	(Sweden) Anette Börjesson	(West Germany) Brigitte Steden (West Germany) Marieluise Zizmann	6–15, 10–15	(silver) Runner-up
1980	Portugal International	(England) Mary Eddy	(England) Gillian Clark (England) Kathleen Redhead	3–15, 5–15	(silver) Runner-up
1981	Portugal International	(England) Catharine Troke	(Netherlands) Marjan Ridder (Norway) Else Thoresen	7–15, 15–18	(silver) Runner-up
1982	Portugal International	(England) Paula Kilvington	(England) Nora Perry (England) Catharine Troke	9–15, 4–15	(silver) Runner-up
1984	Portugal International	(England) Fiona Elliott	(Denmark) Gitte Rygaard (Denmark) B. Lund	15–9, 15–4	(gold) Winner
1986	Portugal International	(England) D. Pulford	(Portugal) Margarida Cruz (Portugal) Paula Sousa	3–15, 7–15	(silver) Runner-up

Mixed doubles
Year	Tournament	Partner	Opponent	Score	Result
1965	Swedish Open	(Sweden) Berndt Dahlberg	(Denmark) Henning Borch (Denmark) Ulla Rasmussen	9–15, 9–15	(silver) Runner-up
1969	Norwegian International	(Sweden) Sture Johnsson	(Sweden) Kurt Johnsson (Sweden) Karin Lindquist	15–7, 15–7	(gold) Winner
1968	Malaysia Open	(Denmark) Svend Andersen	(Malaysia) Teh Kew San (Malaysia) Ng Mei Ling	18–17, 15–13	(gold) Winner
1971	Norwegian International	(Sweden) Gert Perneklo	(Denmark) Erland Kops (Denmark) Lene Køppen	3–15, 15–5, 15–10	(gold) Winner
1972	U. S. Open	(England) Elliot Stuart	(Denmark) Flemming Delfs (Denmark) Pernille Kaagaard	5–15, 1–15	(silver) Runner-up
1972	Canadian Open	(England) Elliot Stuart	(Denmark) Flemming Delfs (Denmark) Pernille Kaagaard	11–15, 17–18	(silver) Runner-up
1973	German Open	(Sweden) Gert Perneklo	(West Germany) Wolfgang Bochow (West Germany) Marieluise Zizmann	15–13, 15–2	(gold) Winner
1973	India Open	(England) Elliot Stuart	(India) Satish Bhatia (India) Morin Mathias	15–0, 15–11	(gold) Winner
1973	U. S. Open	(Sweden) Sture Johnsson	(United States) Thomas Carmichael (United States) Pam Brady	18–13, 15–12	(gold) Winner
1973	Jamaica International	(Sweden) Sture Johnsson	(England) Mike Tredgett (England) Margaret Beck	15–3, 18–15	(gold) Winner
1981	Portugal International	(Scotland) Billy Gilliland	(Netherlands) Rob Ridder (Netherlands) Marjan Ridder	8–15, 17–14, 15–11	(gold) Winner
1982	Portugal International	(Scotland) Billy Gilliland	(England) Ray Stevens (England) Nora Perry	9–15, 9–15	(silver) Runner-up
1984	Portugal International	(England) David Eddy	(England) Gerry Asquith (England) Fiona Elliott	12–15, 15–9, 3–15	(silver) Runner-up
1986	Portugal International	(England) Martin Haddon	(Scotland) Kenny Middlemiss (Portugal) Margarida Cruz	17–18, 11–15	(silver) Runner-up
