= Joke van Beusekom =

Dutch badminton player

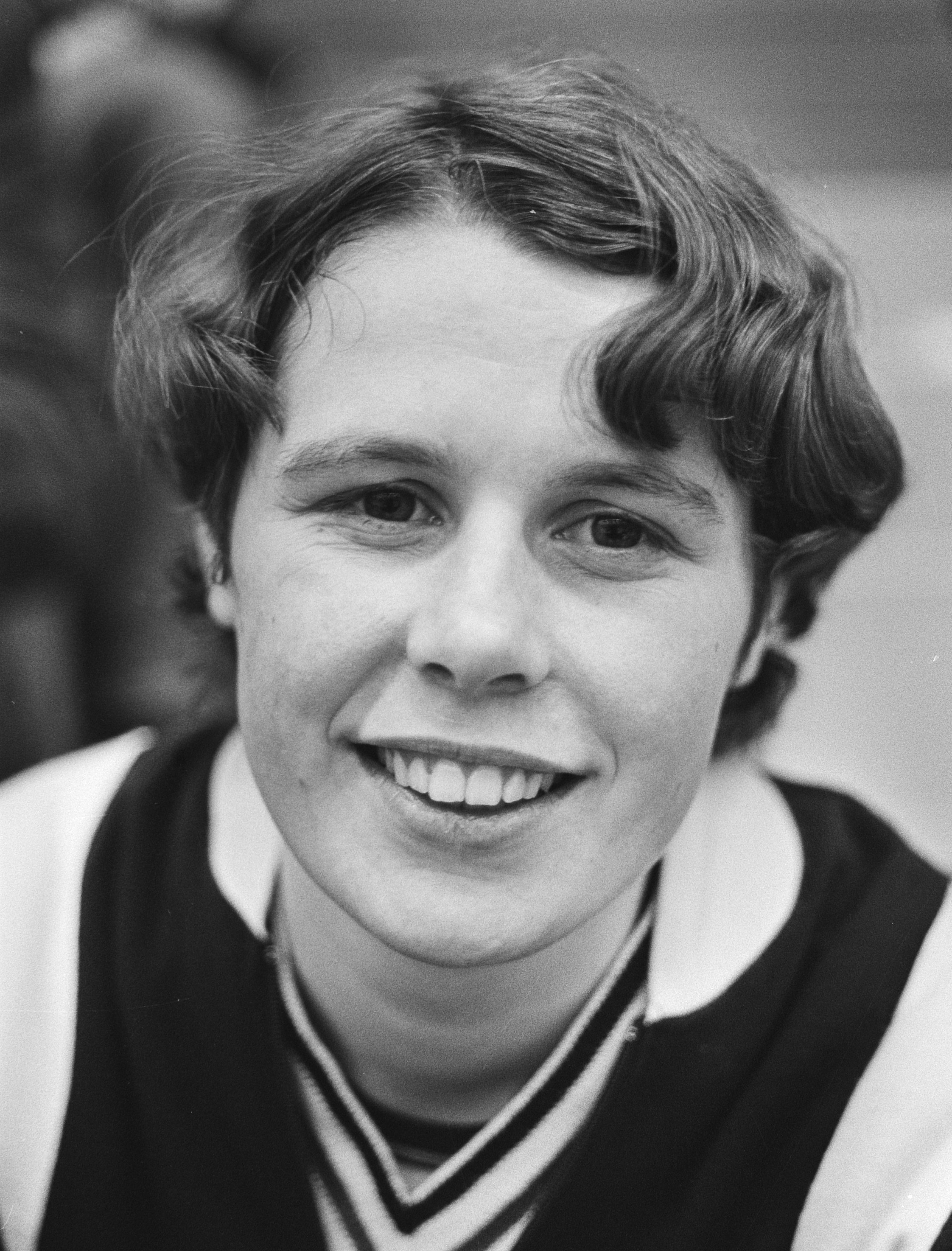
- Joke van Beusekom in 1976

Personal information
- Born: 23 June 1952 (age 74) Wassenaar, South Holland, Netherlands

Sport
- Country: Netherlands
- Sport: Badminton
Medal record
Women's badminton
Representing Netherlands
World Championships
Silver medal – second place	1977 Malmö	Women's doubles
European Championships
Bronze medal – third place	1972 Karlskrona	Women's singles
Bronze medal – third place	1974 Vienna	Women's singles
Bronze medal – third place	1978 Preston	Women's singles
Bronze medal – third place	1968 Bochum	Women's doubles
Bronze medal – third place	1974 Vienna	Women's doubles
Bronze medal – third place	1978 Preston	Women's doubles
European Junior Championships
Gold medal – first place	1969 Leidschendam-Voorburg	Girls' doubles
Bronze medal – third place	1969 Leidschendam-Voorburg	Girls' singles

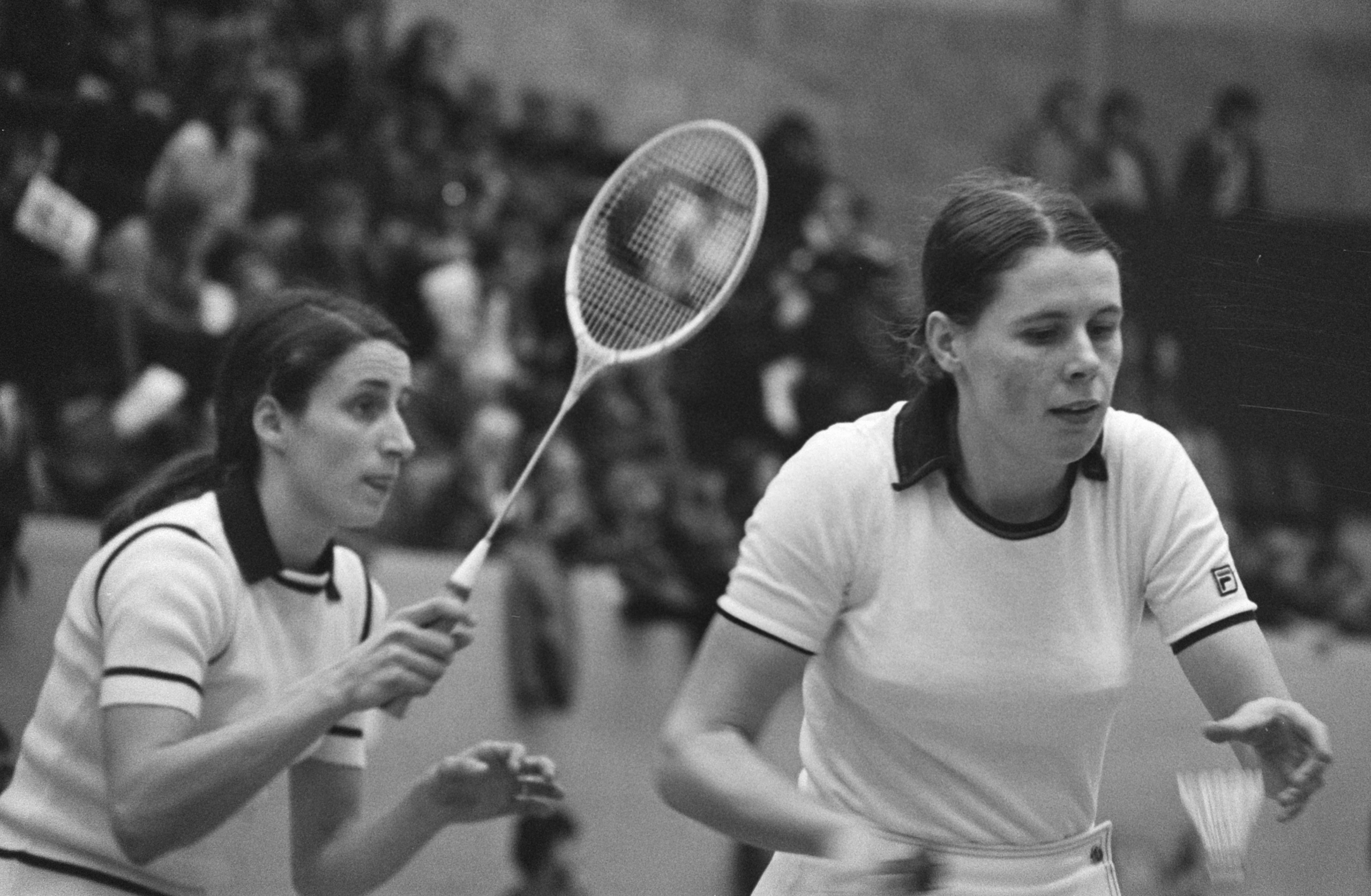
Marjan Ridder and Joke van Beusekom (right) in 1976

Joke van Beusekom (born 23 June 1952 in Wassenaar, South Holland) is a retired female badminton player from the Netherlands.

== Career ==
Nationally, she was the most successful Dutch female player, winning a record 25 Dutch titles and playing, between 1967 and 1983, 67 times for the Dutch team.

Internationally she was most successful in women's doubles, usually partnered with Marjan Luesken (later "Ridder"), winning at the (first) European Youth Championships in 1969, the Denmark Open in 1972 and 1975, the Irish International in 1975 (where she also won the singles title), and the Dutch Open in 1977. Van Beusekom and Luesken further earned bronze at the 1968, 1974, and 1978 European Championships, and silver at the (first) World Championships in 1977 in Malmö.
