= 1972 European Mixed Team Badminton Championships =

Tournament details
- Dates: 12–13 April 1972
- Edition: 1
- Venue: Karlskrona Idrottshall
- Location: Karlskrona, Sweden

The 1972 European Mixed Team Badminton Championships were held in Karlskrona, Sweden from 12 and 13 April 1972, two days prior to the individual championships. The tournament was hosted by the European Badminton Union and Svenska Badmintonförbundet. The tournament was held at the Karlskrona Idrottshall.

== Medalists ==
Event	Gold	Silver	Bronze
Mixed team	England; David Eddy; Ray Stevens; Elliot Stuart; Derek Talbot; Margaret Beck; Gillian Gilks; Judy Hashman; Julie Rickard	Denmark; Flemming Delfs; Elo Hansen; Klaus Kaagaard; Erland Kops; Annie Bøg Jørgensen; Anne Flindt; Karin Jørgensen; Pernille Kaagaard; Lene Køppen	West Germany; Wolfgang Bochow; Willi Braun; Gerhard Kucki; Roland Maywald; Michael Schnaase; Karin Kucki; Brigitte Steden; Marieluise Wackerow; Gudrun Ziebold

== Draw ==
A total of twelve teams competed in the championships.

Group 1	Group 2
Denmark; England; West Germany; Sweden (Host); Scotland	Austria; Czechoslovakia; Finland; Ireland; Netherlands; Wales; Yugoslavia

== Group 1 ==
Pos	Team	W	L	MF	MA	MD	Pts
1	England	4	0	16	4	+12	4
2	Denmark	3	1	13	7	+6	3
3	West Germany	2	2	11	9	+2	2
4	Sweden (H)	1	3	9	11	−2	1
5	Scotland	0	4	1	19	−18	0

=== England vs Scotland ===
England
5
Karlskrona Idrottshall
12 April 1972

Scotland
0

			1	2	3
1	(England) (Scotland)	Ray Stevens; Robert S. McCoig	17; 18	15; 1	15; 4
2	(England) (Scotland)	Margaret Beck; Helen Kelly	11; 0	11; 0
3	(England) (Scotland)	Elliot Stuart / Derek Talbot; Fraser Gow / Robert S. McCoig	15; 6	17; 18	15; 6
4	(England) (Scotland)	Judy Hashman / Julie Rickard; Mary Odell / Christine Stewart	15; 4	15; 7
5	(England) (Scotland)	David Eddy / Gillian Gilks; Fraser Gow / Christine Stewart	15; 6	15; 11

=== Denmark vs West Germany ===
Denmark
3
Karlskrona Idrottshall
12 April 1972

West Germany
2

			1	2	3
1	(Denmark) (West Germany)	Flemming Delfs; Wolfgang Bochow	9; 15	15; 10	15; 5
2	(Denmark) (West Germany)	Pernille Kaagaard; Brigitte Steden	5; 11	11; 9	9; 11
3	(Denmark) (West Germany)	Klaus Kaagaard / Erland Kops; Gerhard Kucki / Roland Maywald	17; 14	15; 12
4	(Denmark) (West Germany)	Anne Flindt / Pernille Kaagaard; Brigitte Steden / Marieluise Wackerow	15; 2	15; 4
5	(Denmark) (West Germany)	Klaus Kaagaard / Anne Flindt; Wolfgang Bochow / Marieluise Wackerow	6; 15	2; 15

=== Sweden vs Scotland ===
Sweden
4
Karlskrona Idrottshall
12 April 1972

Scotland
1

			1	2	3
1	(Sweden) (Scotland)	Sture Johnsson; Nicol McCloy	15; 1	15; 5
2	(Sweden) (Scotland)	Eva Twedberg; Helen Kelly	11; 3	11; 1
3	(Sweden) (Scotland)	Thomas Kihlström / Gert Perneklo; Fraser Gow / Robert S. McCoig	8; 15	15; 9	15; 5
4	(Sweden) (Scotland)	Anette Börjesson / Marianne Vallin; Mary Odell / Christine Stewart	4; 15	17; 18
5	(Sweden) (Scotland)	Bengt Fröman / Eva Twedberg; Fraser Gow / Christine Stewart	17; 15	15; 4

=== England vs Denmark ===
England
4
Karlskrona Idrottshall
12 April 1972

Denmark
1

			1	2	3
1	(England) (Denmark)	Ray Stevens; Flemming Delfs	16; 17	15; 8	15; 9
2	(England) (Denmark)	Margaret Beck; Karin Jørgensen	6; 11	11; 1	11; 7
3	(England) (Denmark)	Elliot Stuart / Derek Talbot; Klaus Kaagaard / Erland Kops	8; 15	15; 10	15; 11
4	(England) (Denmark)	Margaret Beck / Judy Hashman; Anne Flindt / Pernille Kaagaard	5; 15	6; 15
5	(England) (Denmark)	Derek Talbot / Gillian Gilks; Flemming Delfs / Pernille Kaagaard	15; 11	18; 14

=== Sweden vs West Germany ===
Sweden
2
Karlskrona Idrottshall
12 April 1972

West Germany
3

			1	2	3
1	(Sweden) (West Germany)	Sture Johnsson; Michael Schnaase	11; 15	15; 5	15; 3
2	(Sweden) (West Germany)	Eva Twedberg; Gudrun Ziebold	1; 11	11; 6	11; 5
3	(Sweden) (West Germany)	Thomas Kihlström / Gert Perneklo; Willi Braun / Roland Maywald	12; 15	10; 15
4	(Sweden) (West Germany)	Anette Börjesson / Marianne Vallin; Karin Kucki / Brigitte Steden	3; 15	4; 15
5	(Sweden) (West Germany)	Gert Perneklo / Eva Twedberg; Wolfgang Bochow / Marieluise Wackerow	15; 13	3; 15	14; 18

=== Denmark vs Scotland ===
Denmark
5
Karlskrona Idrottshall
13 April 1972

Scotland
0

			1	2	3
1	(Denmark) (Scotland)	Flemming Delfs; Nicol McCloy	15; 0	15; 2
2	(Denmark) (Scotland)	Anne Flindt; Mary Odell	4; 11	12; 9	11; 2
3	(Denmark) (Scotland)	Elo Hansen / Erland Kops; Fraser Gow / Robert S. McCoig	18; 13	15; 6
4	(Denmark) (Scotland)	Anne Flindt / Pernille Kaagaard; Helen Kelly / Christine Stewart	15; 10	15; 10
5	(Denmark) (Scotland)	Elo Hansen / Pernille Kaagaard; Fraser Gow / Christine Stewart	15; 8	16; 18	15; 6

=== England vs Sweden ===
England
3
Karlskrona Idrottshall
13 April 1972

Sweden
2

			1	2	3
1	(England) (Sweden)	David Eddy; Sture Johnsson	5; 15	6; 15
2	(England) (Sweden)	Gillian Gilks; Eva Twedberg	8; 11	5; 11
3	(England) (Sweden)	Elliot Stuart / Derek Talbot; Thomas Kihlström / Gert Perneklo	15; 12	15; 13
4	(England) (Sweden)	Margaret Beck / Julie Rickard; Anette Börjesson / Marianne Vallin	15; 1	15; 0
5	(England) (Sweden)	Derek Talbot / Gillian Gilks; Thomas Kihlström / Eva Twedberg	15; 7	15; 13

=== West Germany vs Scotland ===
West Germany
5
Karlskrona Idrottshall
13 April 1972

Scotland
0

			1	2	3
1	(West Germany) (Scotland)	Michael Schnaase; Nicol McCloy	15; 7	15; 9
2	(West Germany) (Scotland)	Gudrun Ziebold; Mary Odell	11; 1	11; 7
3	(West Germany) (Scotland)	Willi Braun / Roland Maywald; Fraser Gow / Robert S. McCoig	15; 11	15; 6
4	(West Germany) (Scotland)	Karin Kucki / Marieluise Wackerow; Helen Kelly / Christine Stewart	13; 15	15; 8	15; 3
5	(West Germany) (Scotland)	Wolfgang Bochow / Marieluise Wackerow; Fraser Gow / Christine Stewart	15; 8	15; 2

=== Denmark vs Sweden ===
Denmark
4
Karlskrona Idrottshall
13 April 1972

Sweden
1

			1	2	3
1	(Denmark) (Sweden)	Flemming Delfs; Sture Johnsson	15; 0	12; 15	15; 8
2	(Denmark) (Sweden)	Pernille Kaagaard; Eva Twedberg	10; 12	5; 11
3	(Denmark) (Sweden)	Elo Hansen / Erland Kops; Thomas Kihlström / Gert Perneklo	15; 9	15; 13
4	(Denmark) (Sweden)	Anne Flindt / Karin Jørgensen; Anette Börjesson / Karin Lindqvist	15; 3	15; 11
5	(Denmark) (Sweden)	Elo Hansen / Pernille Kaagaard; Gert Perneklo / Eva Twedberg	6; 15	15; 13	15; 9

=== England vs West Germany ===
England
4
Karlskrona Idrottshall
13 April 1972

West Germany
1

			1	2	3
1	(England) (West Germany)	Ray Stevens; Michael Schnaase	15; 5	17; 14
2	(England) (West Germany)	Margaret Beck; Brigitte Steden	6; 11	11; 7	12; 9
3	(England) (West Germany)	Elliot Stuart / Derek Talbot; Willi Braun / Roland Maywald	8; 15	7; 15
4	(England) (West Germany)	Gillian Gilks / Judy Hashman; Brigitte Steden / Gudrun Ziebold	15; 0	15; 2
5	(England) (West Germany)	Derek Talbot / Gillian Gilks; Wolfgang Bochow / Marieluise Wackerow	15; 11	18; 4

== Group 2 ==
=== Preliminary stage ===
The seven teams that competed in the preliminary stage were split into two sections, Section 1 and Section 2. Four teams in Section 1 competed in an elimination format to determine the team ranks in the section for the play-off stage draw. In Section 2, the remaining teams competed in a round-robin format.

==== Section A ====
Section semi-finals
Czechoslovakia	5
Yugoslavia	0
Wales	1
Ireland	4

Section final
Czechoslovakia	0
Ireland	5
Third place in section
Yugoslavia	1
Wales	4

Standings
Pos	Team
1	Ireland
2	Czechoslovakia
3	Wales
4	Yugoslavia

==== Section B ====
Pos	Team	W	L	MF	MA	MD	Pts	Final result	Netherlands	Austria	Finland
1	Netherlands	2	0	9	1	+8	2	6th to 9th	—	5–0	4–1
2	Austria	1	1	5	5	0	1	6th to 9th		—	5–0
3	Finland	0	2	1	9	−8	0	10th to 12th			—

=== Play-offs ===
==== 6th to 9th place ====
6th–9th place
A1	Ireland	4
B2	Austria	1
A2	Czechoslovakia	0
B1	Netherlands	5

6th place
A1	Ireland	1
B1	Netherlands	4
8th place
B2	Austria	3
A2	Czechoslovakia	2

==== 10th to 12th place ====
Pos	Team	W	L	MF	MA	MD	Pts	Final result	Wales	Yugoslavia	Finland
1	Wales	2	0	9	1	+8	2	10th place	—	4–1	5–0
2	Yugoslavia	1	1	8	2	+6	1	11th place		—	4–1
3	Finland	0	2	1	9	−8	0	12th place			—
