= 1977 IBF World Championships – Men's singles =

Badminton championships

Men's singles at the 1977 IBF World Championships
- Venue: Malmö Isstadion
- Location: Malmö, Sweden
- Dates: May 3, 1977 – May 8, 1977

Medalists
gold medal	Flemming Delfs	Denmark
silver medal	Svend Pri	Denmark
bronze medal	Iie Sumirat	Indonesia
bronze medal	Thomas Kihlström	Sweden

The 1977 BWF World Championships took place from May 3–8, 1977 in Malmö, Sweden. This was the inaugural edition of the World Championships with the joint top seeds being Liem Swie King and Flemming Delfs.

== Main stage ==
=== Section 1 ===
First round
Thomas Kihlström	15	15
(Japan) Nobutaka Ikeda	5	8
(Mexico) Victor Jaramillo Luque	18	15
(India) Uday Pawar	13	9
(Indonesia) Liem Swie King	15	15
(England) David Eddy	1	6
(Australia) Peter Cooper	15	15
(Pakistan) Tahir Mohamed	2	2
Elo Hansen	15	18
(Canada) James McGee	8	15
(Thailand) Bandid Jaiyen	15	4	15
(Germany) Willi Braun	6	15	13
(Netherlands) Rob Ridder	15	15
(Israel) Victor Yursim Ashod	1	0
(Iceland) Johann Kjartansson	15	15
(Zambia) Yagesh Pathak	5	5

Second round
(Sweden) Thomas Kihlström	15	15
(Mexico) Victor Jaramillo Luque	7	8
(Indonesia) Liem Swie King	15	15
(Australia) Peter Cooper	8	7
Elo Hansen	15	15
(Thailand) Bandid Jaiyen	7	9
(Netherlands) Rob Ridder	15	15
(Iceland) Johann Kjartansson	1	4

Third round
Thomas Kihlström	15	9	15
(Indonesia) Liem Swie King	9	15	12
Elo Hansen	15	15
(Netherlands) Rob Ridder	9	3

Quarterfinals
Thomas Kihlström	15	15
Elo Hansen	5	1

=== Section 2 ===
First round
Svend Pri	18	15
(Canada) Lucio Fabris	16	9
(Thailand) Laio Kon-Fu	15	15
(Norway) Knut Engelbertsen	12	13
(Sweden) Stefan Karlsson	15	15
(Socialist Federal Republic of Yugoslavia) Miho Sepec	0	3
(Mexico) Ricardo Jaramillo Luque	15	15
(Scotland) Gordon Hamilton	8	13
Hadiyanto	15	17
(New Zealand) Bryan Purser	13	16
(Germany) Wolfgang Bochow	15	15
(United States) Miles Munson	1	5
Masao Tsuchida	7	15	17
(England) Derek Talbot	15	12	16
(India) Partho Ganguli	15	15
(Zambia) Visnan Kapil	2	2

Second round
Svend Pri	15	15
(Thailand) Laio Kon-Fu	7	6
(Sweden) Stefan Karlsson	w.o.
(Mexico) Ricardo Jaramillo Luque
Hadiyanto	15	17	15
(Germany) Wolfgang Bochow	9	18	2
Masao Tsuchida	15	15
(India) Partho Ganguli	8	10

Third round
Svend Pri	15	15
(Sweden) Stefan Karlsson	7	7
Hadiyanto	15	15
Masao Tsuchida	4	7

Quarterfinals
Svend Pri	15	15
Hadiyanto	2	10

=== Section 3 ===
First round
Prakash Padukone	17	15
(Japan) Shoichi Toganoo	14	11
(Chinese Taipei) Jih Shu-Ching	15	15
(Zambia) Judien Lawes	0	3
(Mexico) Roy Díaz González	15	15
Morten Frost	11	13
(Iceland) Sigurdur Haraldsson	16	15	18
(Jamaica) Trevor Stewart	18	9	15
Iie Sumirat	15	15
(Canada) John Czich	12	3
(Netherlands) Piet Ridder	15	15
(Scotland) Billy Gilliland	7	12
(England) Mike Tredgett	15	17
(Germany) Roland Maywald	7	14
Tomas Angarth	13	15	15
(Finland) Lars-Henrik Nybergh	15	4	8

Second round
Prakash Padukone	15	15
(Chinese Taipei) Jih Shu-Ching	9	4
(Mexico) Roy Díaz González	15	15
(Iceland) Sigurdur Haraldsson	6	2
Iie Sumirat	15	15
(Netherlands) Piet Ridder	3	2
(England) Mike Tredgett	15	15
Tomas Angarth	6	8

Third round
Prakash Padukone	15	14	15
(Mexico) Roy Díaz González	4	18	6
Iie Sumirat	15	15
(England) Mike Tredgett	9	1

Quarterfinals
Prakash Padukone	6	15	11
Iie Sumirat	15	10	15

=== Section 4 ===
First round
Sture Johnsson	15	15
(Mexico) Jorge Palazuelos	3	5
(Chinese Taipei) Chung Trung-Lieh	15	15
(Norway) Petter Thoresen	3	11
(Canada) Greg Carter	15	15
(Socialist Federal Republic of Yugoslavia) Gregor Berden	8	7
(Portugal) Manuel Joas	15	15
(Zambia) Malcolm Abraham	11	5
Flemming Delfs
bye
(England) Ray Stevens	15	15
(Germany) Michael Schnaase	5	7
(Japan) Kinji Zeniya
Basri Yussif	15	15
(Belgium) Jean-Pierre Bauduin	10	3

Second round
Sture Johnsson	15	15
(Chinese Taipei) Chung Trung-Lieh	5	4
(Canada) Greg Carter	15	15
(Portugal) Manuel Joas	4	2
Flemming Delfs	11	15	15
(England) Ray Stevens	15	10	6
(Japan) Kinji Zeniya	15	15
Basri Yussif	6	6

Third round
Sture Johnsson	15	15
(Canada) Greg Carter	3	9
Flemming Delfs	7	17	15
(Japan) Kinji Zeniya	15	15	12

Quarterfinals
Sture Johnsson	6	10
Flemming Delfs	15	15

== Final stage ==
Quarterfinals
1	Thomas Kihlström	15	15
8	Elo Hansen	5	1
4	Svend Pri	15	15
5	Hadiyanto	2	10
3	Prakash Padukone	6	15	11
6	Iie Sumirat	15	10	15
2	Sture Johnsson	6	10
7	Flemming Delfs	15	15

Semifinals
Thomas Kihlström	6	6
Svend Pri	15	15
Iie Sumirat	1	17
Flemming Delfs	15	18

Finals
Svend Pri	5	6
Flemming Delfs	15	15
