= 1970 All England Badminton Championships =

1970 All England Championships
Tournament details
- Dates: 18 March 1970– 22 March 1970
- Edition: 60th
- Venue: Wembley Arena
- Location: London

The 1970 All England Championships was a badminton tournament held at Wembley Arena, London, England, from 18–22 March 1970.

== Final results ==
Category	Winners	Runners-up	Score
Men's singles	(Indonesia) Rudy Hartono	(Denmark) Svend Andersen Pri	15-7, 15-1
Women's singles	(Japan) Etsuko Takenaka	(England) Heather Nielsen	11-3, 11-4
Men's doubles	(Denmark) Tom Bacher & Poul Petersen	(England) David Eddy & Roger Powell	15-11, 15-0
Women's doubles	(England) Margaret Boxall & Susan Whetnall	(England) Gillian Perrin & Julie Rickard	15-6, 8-15, 15-9
Mixed doubles	(Denmark) Per Walsøe & Pernille Mølgaard Hansen	(West Germany) Wolfgang Bochow & Irmgard Latz	17-14, 15-12

Agnes Geen married and became Agnes Van der Meulen, Marjan Ridder married and became Marjan Luesken and Lonny Funch married and became Lonny Bostofte.

== Men's singles ==
=== Section 1 ===
Round of 32
(Indonesia) Rudy Hartono +	15	15
(England) Paul Whetnall	2	6
(West Germany) Torsten Winter	10	15	15
(Denmark) Klaus Kaagaard	15	5	11
(Denmark) Tom Bacher	17	15
(West Germany) Siegfried Betz	14	5
(South Africa) Alan Parsons	15	15
(England) D J Hutchinson	2	7
(Japan) Ippei Kojima +	15	15
(West Germany) Wolfgang Bochow	6	12
(England) David Eddy	6	15	17
(South Africa) R Du Toit	15	6	14
(Indonesia) Darmadi +	15	15
(England) R J Westmorland	3	1
(Denmark) Jorgen Mortensen	15	15
(Sweden) Tommy Theorin	8	5

Round of 16
(Indonesia) Hartono	15	15
(West Germany) Winter	0	2
(Denmark) Bacher	15	15
(South Africa) Parsons	1	3
(Japan) Kojima	15	15
(England) Eddy	14	5
(Indonesia) Darmadi	15	15
(Denmark) Mortensen	9	6

Quarter-finals
(Indonesia) Hartono	15	15
(Denmark) Bacher	5	8
(Japan) Kojima	5	15	15
(Indonesia) Darmadi	15	11	9

Semi-finals
(Indonesia) Hartono	18	17
(Japan) Kojima	17	14

=== Section 2 ===
Round of 32
(Denmark) Svend Andersen Pri +	15	15
(England) Ray Sharp	12	12
(Jamaica) Max Lawson	16	15	15
(Sweden) Willy Lund	18	6	10
(Japan) Junji Honma	15	15
(England) Brian White	9	3
(Denmark) Henning Borch	17	15
(Indonesia) Muljadi +	14	12
(Sweden) Sture Johnsson +	15	18
(Scotland) Bob McCoig	2	15
(Denmark) Flemming Delfs	15	3	15
(England) Derek Talbot	5	15	12
(Denmark) Elo Hansen +	15	15
(Denmark) Poul Petersen	2	2
(Indonesia) Indratno	15	15
(West Germany) Gerhard Kucki	8	10

Round of 16
(Denmark) Andersen Pri	15	15
(Jamaica) Lawson	1	6
(Japan) Honma	15	15
(Denmark) Borch	5	9
(Sweden) Johnsson	15	15
(Denmark) Delfs	11	8
(Denmark) Hansen	17	15
(Indonesia) Indratno	15	11

Quarter-finals
(Denmark) Andersen Pri	15	15
(Japan) Honma	2	4
(Sweden) Johnsson	15	15
(Denmark) Hansen	11	1

Semi-finals
(Denmark) Andersen Pri	15	15
(Sweden) Johnsson	9	3

+ Denotes seed

== Women's singles ==
=== Section 1 ===
Round of 32
(Japan) Etsuko Takenaka	11	11
(England) Angela Palmer	6	2
(Denmark) Anne Berglund	11	11
(England) D M White	2	3
(England) Margaret Boxall	11	7	12
(Denmark) Lene Køppen	3	11	10
(Scotland) Joanna Flockhart	11	12
(Netherlands) Marjan Luesken	4	11
(Denmark) Jette Foge	11	11
(West Germany) Irmgard Latz	8	6
(England) Sue Whetnall	w/o
(Japan) Hiroe Yuki +
(England) Gillian Perrin	11	11
(Denmark) Eva Carlsen	4	8
(Netherlands) Joke Van Beusekom	11	11
(West Germany) Gerda Schumcher	3	1

Round of 16
(Japan) Takenaka	11	11
(Denmark) Berglund	6	4
(England) Boxall	11	11
(Scotland) Flockhart	7	4
(Denmark) Foge	11	11
(England) Whetnall	6	5
(England) Perrin	11	11
(Netherlands) Van Beusekom	5	2

Quarter-finals
(Japan) Takenaka	11	11
(England) Boxall	4	3
(Denmark) Foge	11	6	12
(England) Perrin	5	11	11

Semi-finals
(Japan) Takenaka	11	11
(Denmark) Foge	5	7

=== Section 2 ===
Round of 32
(England) Heather Nielsen +	11	12
(Denmark) Lonny Bostofte	3	11
(Denmark) Pernille Mølgaard Hansen	11	11
(West Germany) Gudrun Ziebold	4	5
(Japan) Noriko Takagi	7	11	11
(Sweden) Eva Twedberg +	11	7	7
(Netherlands) Agnes Van der Meulen	11	11
(Denmark) Ulla Strand	2	8
(England) Margaret Beck	11	3	11
(Denmark) Imre Nielsen	7	11	3
(Japan) Hiroe Amano	w/o
(West Germany) Karin Schafer
(United States) Tyna Barinaga +	11	11
(Denmark) Karin Jørgensen	7	3
(Japan) Machiko Aizawa	12	11
(Netherlands) Felice de Nooyer	9	2

Round of 16
(England) Nielsen	11	11
(Denmark) Molgaard-Hansen	8	2
(Japan) Takagi	11	11
(Netherlands) Van der Meulen	5	0
(England) Beck	11	11
(Japan) Amano	9	4
(United States) Barinaga
(Japan) Aizawa

Quarter-finals
(England) Nielsen	11	6
(Japan) Takagi	8	3ret
(England) Beck	6	11	11
(United States) Barinaga	11	3	6

Semi-finals
(England) Nielsen	12	11
(England) Beck	10	0
