= 1969 All England Badminton Championships =

1969 All England Championships
Tournament details
- Dates: 19 March 1969– 23 March 1969
- Edition: 59th
- Venue: Wembley Arena
- Location: London

The 1969 All England Championships was a badminton tournament held at Wembley Arena, London, England, from 19–23 March 1969.

Sue Pound married and became Sue Whetnall, Imre Reitveld married and became Imre Nielsen and Muriel Ferguson married and became Muriel Woodcock.

== Final results ==
Category	Winners	Runners-up	Score
Men's singles	(Indonesia) Rudy Hartono	(Indonesia) Darmadi	15-1, 15-3
Women's singles	(Japan) Hiroe Yuki	(Japan) Noriko Takagi	11-5, 11-5
Men's doubles	(Denmark) Henning Borch & Erland Kops	(England) David Eddy & Roger Powell	13-15, 15-10, 15-9
Women's doubles	(England) Margaret Boxall & Sue Whetnall	(Japan) Hiroe Amano & Tomoko Takahashi	15-11, 15-11
Mixed doubles	(England) Roger Mills & Gillian Perrin	(England) Tony Jordan & Susan Whetnall	9-15, 15-5, 15-12

== Men's singles ==
=== Section 1 ===
Round of 32
(Indonesia) Rudy Hartono +	15	15
(England) Ray Sharp	7	10
(Denmark) Elo Hansen	15	15
(Singapore) Lee Kin Tat	6	10
(Japan) Ippei Kojima +	15	15
(England) Brian White	6	11
(Malaysia) Tan Aik Mong	15	18
(Denmark) Carsten Morild	11	16
(Malaysia) Oon Chong Hau +	15	15
(England) David Rowe	3	5
(Scotland) Bob McCoig	15	17
(Mexico) Roy Diaz Gonzalez	3	16
(Denmark) Svend Pri +	15	15
(Netherlands) Piet Ridder	3	6
(Indonesia) Muljadi	15	15
(England) Derek Talbot	7	8

Round of 16
(Indonesia) Hartono	15	15
(Denmark) Hansen	9	1
(Japan) Kojima	15	6	15
(Malaysia) Mong	8	15	9
(Malaysia) Hau	15	15
(Scotland) McCoig	3	7
(Denmark) Svend Pri	10	15	15
(Indonesia) Muljadi	15	3	11

Quarter-finals
(Indonesia) Hartono	15	15
(Japan) Kojima	9	1
(Malaysia) Hau	15	17
(Denmark) Svend Pri	12	14

Semi-finals
(Indonesia) Hartono	15	15
(Malaysia) Hau	7	1

=== Section 2 ===
Round of 32
(Indonesia) Darmadi +	15	18
(Malaysia) Punch Gunalan	11	16
(England) Paul Whetnall	15	15
(Denmark) Klaus Kagaard	4	7
(Sweden) Sture Johnsson +	15	15
(West Germany) Horst Losche	3	8
(Denmark) Jorgen Mortensen	15	15
(England) Elliott Stuart	3	8
(Malaysia) Tan Aik Huang +	15	15
(Netherlands) Huub Van Ginneken	5	2
(West Germany) Roland Maywald	15	15
(England) Colin Beacom	8	8
(Sweden) Kurt Johnsson	15	15
(England) David Eddy	3	9
(Denmark) Erland Kops +	15	17
(England) David Hunt	6	16

Round of 16
(Indonesia) Darmadi	15	15
(England) Whetnall	11	2
(Sweden) Johnsson S	18	15
(Denmark) Mortensen	15	4
(Malaysia) Aik Huang	15	15
(West Germany) Maywald	11	6
(Sweden) Johnsson K	15	15
(Denmark) Kops	7	7

Quarter-finals
(Indonesia) Darmadi	15	15
(Sweden) Johnsson S	9	4
(Malaysia) Aik Huang	15	15
(Sweden) Johnsson K	8	5

Semi-finals
(Indonesia) Darmadi	15	15
(Malaysia) Aik Huang	10	9

+ Denotes seed

== Women's singles ==
=== Section 1 ===
Round of 32
(Japan) Hiroe Yuki +	11	11
(Denmark) Lizbeth von Barnekow	7	3
(England) Margaret Beck	11	11
(Sweden) Ann Christine Rosenqvist	10	1
(Denmark) Pernille Mølgaard Hansen	11	11
(Netherlands) Lilli Ter Metz	8	2
(Malaysia) Sylvia Ng	12	11
(Netherlands) Felice De Nooyer	11	4
(Denmark) Imre Nielsen	11	11
(Netherlands) Margot Ter Metz	4	3
(England) Margaret Boxall	11	11
(Japan) Hiroe Amano	1	8
(Sweden) Eva Twedberg +	11	11
(Denmark) Karin Jørgensen	5	7
(West Germany) Karin Dittberner	11	11
(Scotland) Mary Thompson	3	9

Round of 16
(Japan) Yuki	11	11
(England) Beck	2	5
(Denmark) Mølgaard Hansen	11	11
(Malaysia) Ng	7	9
(Denmark) Nielsen I	11	11
(England) Boxall	0	0
(Sweden) Twedberg	11	11
(West Germany) Dittberner	1	2

Quarter-finals
(Japan) Yuki	11	11
(Denmark) Mølgaard Hansen	5	2
(Denmark) Nielsen I	11	11
(Sweden) Twedberg	6	8

Semi-finals
(Japan) Yuki	11	11
(Denmark) Nielsen I	7	1

=== Section 2 ===
Round of 32
(Japan) Noriko Takagi +	w/o
(Sweden) Kathryn Ekengren
(Denmark) Jette Føge	11	6	11
(Scotland) Muriel Woodcock	6	11	4
(Republic of Ireland) Mary Bryan +	w/o
(West Germany) Anke Witten
(England) Sue Whetnall	3	11	11
(Netherlands) Joke Van Beusekom	11	6	2
(Indonesia) Minarni Soedaryanto +	11	12
(New Zealand) Alison Glenie	4	11
(Denmark) Anne Flindt	11	11
(Scotland) Maureen Hume	4	2
(England) Heather Nielsen +	12	11
(West Germany) Marieluise Wackerow	10	7
(Japan) Tomoko Takahashi	11	11
(Malaysia) Rosalind Singha Ang	4	4

Round of 16
(Japan) Takagi	11	11
(Denmark) Foge	0	1
(Republic of Ireland) Bryan	11	11
(England) Whetnall	3	5
(Indonesia) Minarni	11	11
(Denmark) Flindt	3	3
(England) Nielsen H	12	7	12
(Japan) Takahashi	11	11	10

Quarter-finals
(Japan) Takagi	11	11
(Republic of Ireland) Bryan	2	0
(Indonesia) Minarni	11	11
(England) Nielsen H	4	0

Semi-finals
(Japan) Takagi	11	11
(Indonesia) Minarni	5	6

+ seeded player
