= Roger Powell (badminton) =

English badminton player

Personal information
- Born: 1945 (age 80–81)

Sport
- Country: England
- Sport: Badminton
Medal record
Men's badminton
Representing England
European Championships
| Gold medal – first place | 1968 Bochum | Men's doubles |
| Bronze medal – third place | 1970 Port Talbot | Men's doubles |

Roger A. Powell is a retired male badminton player from England.

== Career ==
Powell won the gold medal at the 1968 European Badminton Championships in men's doubles with David Eddy. They were men's doubles runners-up at the prestigious All-England Championships in both 1969 and 1970.

== Achievements ==
=== European Championships ===
Men's doubles
| Year | Venue | Partner | Opponent | Score | Result |
|---|---|---|---|---|---|
| 1968 | Ruhrlandhalle, Bochum, West Germany | (England) David Eddy | (England) Tony Jordan (England) Roger Mills | 7–15, 15–13, 15–5 | Gold |
| 1970 | Afan Lido, Port Talbot, Wales | (England) David Eddy | (Denmark) Erland Kops (Denmark) Henning Borch | 8–15, 5–15 | Bronze |

=== International tournaments ===
Men's doubles
| Year | Tournament | Partner | Opponent | Score | Result |
|---|---|---|---|---|---|
| 1968 | Scottish Open | (England) David Eddy | (England) David Horton (England) Tony Jordan | 11–15, 15–6, 15–5 | (gold) Winner |
| 1969 | All England Open | (England) David Eddy | (Denmark) Henning Borch (Denmark) Erland Kops | 15–13, 10–15, 9–15 | (silver) Runner-up |
| 1969 | Irish Open | (England) David Eddy | (England) Roger Mills (England) Tony Jordan | 15–8, 15–8 | (silver) Runner-up |
| 1970 | All England Open | (England) David Eddy | (Denmark) Tom Bacher (Denmark) Poul Petersen | 11–15, 0–15 | (silver) Runner-up |
| 1970 | Dutch Open | (England) David Eddy | (West Germany) Roland Maywald (West Germany) Gerhard Kucki | 15–8, 15–10 | (gold) Winner |
