= Dutch Open (badminton) =

Badminton championship in the Netherlands

The Dutch Open is an annual badminton tournament held in the Netherlands for the first time in November 1931 and is currently organized by Badminton Nederland. It is a part of the European Badminton Circuit.

== Past winners ==
Year	Men's singles	Women's singles	Men's doubles	Women's doubles	Mixed doubles	Ref
1931	(England) G. E. Devaston	(England) Miss Esnough	(England) G. E. Devaston (England) E. Mayne	(England) G. Devaston (England) Miss Esnough	(England) G. E. Devaston (England) G. Devaston	
1932	No competition					
1933	(England) F. L. Treasure	(England) Margaret Tragett	(England) J. D. M. McCallum (England) F. L. Treasure	(England) Marian Horsley (England) Margaret Tragett	(England) F. L. Treasure (England) Margaret Tragett	
1934	(Denmark) Sven Strømann	(Denmark) Bodil Clausen	(Denmark) K. Sandvad (Denmark) Sven Strømann	(Denmark) Bodil Clausen (Denmark) Tonny Olsen	(Denmark) Sven Strømann (Denmark) Bodil Clausen	
1935	(Denmark) Sven Strømann	(Denmark) Tonny Olsen	(Denmark) K. Sandvad (Denmark) Sven Strømann	(Denmark) Bodil Clausen (Denmark) Tonny Olsen	(Denmark) K. Sandvad (Denmark) Tonny Olsen	
1936	(Netherlands) E. H. den Hoed, Jr.	(Denmark) Tonny Olsen	(Denmark) K. Sandvad (Denmark) Sven Strømann	(Denmark) Bodil Clausen (Denmark) Tonny Olsen	(Denmark) K. Sandvad (Denmark) Tonny Olsen	
1937	(England) H. J. Wingfield	(England) C. D. Newitt	(England) S. C. Minard (England) G. E. A. Tautz	(England) L. W. Myers (England) J. R. Stewart	(England) S. C. Minard (England) J. R. Stewart	
1938– 1952	No competition					
1953	(Denmark) Jesper Sandvad	(Denmark) Tove Andersen	(Denmark) Jesper Sandvad (Denmark) Ole Mertz	(Denmark) Tove Andersen (Denmark) Jytte Malmqvist	(Denmark) Jesper Sandvad (Denmark) Tove Andersen	
1954	(Malaysia) Eddy Choong	(Denmark) Hanne Jensen	(Denmark) Jørn Skaarup (Denmark) Preben Dabelsteen	(Denmark) Hanne Jensen (Denmark) Annelise Hansen	(Denmark) Jørn Skaarup (Denmark) Annelise Hansen	
1955	(Malaysia) Eddy Choong	(Denmark) Hanne Jensen	(Malaysia) David Choong (Malaysia) Eddy Choong	(Denmark) Grete Flensted (Denmark) Edel Christensen	(Denmark) Arne Rasmussen (Denmark) Grete Flensted	
1956	(Indonesia) Ferry Sonneville	(Denmark) Agnete Friis	(Denmark) H. Becker Hansen (Denmark) Hans Jensen	(England) June Timperley (England) Barbara Carpenter	(England) June Timperley (England) June Timperley	
1957	(Malaysia) Eddy Choong	(England) June Timperley	(Malaysia) Eddy Choong (Malaysia) Oon Chong Teik	(Denmark) Anni Hammergaard Hansen (Denmark) Hanne Jensen	(Malaysia) Eddy Choong (Denmark) Hanne Jensen	
1958	(Indonesia) Ferry Sonneville	(England) Iris Rogers	(Denmark) Erland Kops (Denmark) J. Hageman	(England) June Timperley (England) Iris Rogers	(England) Hugh Findlay (England) Iris Rogers	
1959	(Denmark) Knud Aage Nielsen	(Denmark) Karin Rasmussen	(Denmark) Bengt Albertsen (Denmark) Ole Mertz	(Denmark) L. Hagen Olsen (Denmark) Annette Schmidt	(Denmark) Ole Mertz (Denmark) Inge Kjaergaard	
1960	(Indonesia) Ferry Sonneville	(Thailand) Pratuang Pattabongs	(England) John Best (England) Peter Waddell	(Thailand) Pratuang Pattabongs (Denmark) Annette Schmidt	(England) John Best (England) Audrey Marshall	
1961	(Indonesia) Ferry Sonneville	(Denmark) Hanne Jensen	(Denmark) Knud Aage Nielsen (Denmark) Ole Mertz	(Denmark) Hanne Jensen (Denmark) Karin Rasmussen	(Denmark) B. Holst-Christensen (Denmark) Tonny Holst-Christensen	
1962	(Indonesia) Ferry Sonneville	(Denmark) Kirsten Dahl	(Thailand) Charoen Wattanasin (Malaysia) Oon Chong Teik	(Denmark) Bente Flindt (Denmark) Ulla Rasmussen	(Malaysia) Oon Chong Teik (Denmark) Ulla Rasmussen	
1963	(Denmark) Henning Borch	(Denmark) Bente Flindt	(Denmark) Henning Borch (Denmark) Jorgen Mortensen	(Denmark) Bente Flindt (Denmark) Anne Flindt	(Denmark) Hans Henrik Svendsen (Denmark) Anne Flindt	
1964	(Denmark) Henning Borch	(United States) Judy Hashman	(Denmark) Henning Borch (Denmark) Jorgen Mortensen	(Republic of Ireland) Sue Peard (United States) Judy Hashman	(England) John Havers (England) Jennifer Pritchard	
1965	(Denmark) Tom Bacher	(England) Angela Bairstow	(Denmark) Ole Mertz (Denmark) Klaus Kaagaard	(England) Angela Bairstow (England) Anita Price	(England) Tony Jordan (England) Angela Bairstow	
1966	(Denmark) Knud Aage Nielsen	(England) Angela Bairstow	(Malaysia) Punch Gunalan (Malaysia) Oon Chong Hau	(England) Heather Nielsen (England) Jennifer Horton	(England) David Horton (England) Jennifer Horton	
1967	(Denmark) Erland Kops	(Netherlands) Imre Rietveld	(Denmark) Erland Kops (Denmark) Tom Bacher	(Netherlands) Imre Rietveld (Denmark) Ulla Strand	(England) Tony Jordan (England) Angela Bairstow	
1968	(Denmark) Erland Kops	(West Germany) Irmgard Latz	(Thailand) Sangob Rattanusorn (Thailand) Chavalert Chumkum	(England) Margaret Boxall (England) Sue Pound	(England) Paul Whetnall (England) Angela Bairstow	
1969	(Malaysia) Oon Chong Hau	(England) Gillian Perrin	(Denmark) Erland Kops (Denmark) Bjarne Andersen	(West Germany) Marieluise Wackerow (West Germany) Gudrun Ziebold	(England) Derek Talbot (England) Gillian Perrin	
1970	(Denmark) Elo Hansen	(England) Susan Whetnall	(England) David Eddy (England) R. A. Powell	(England) Margaret Boxall (England) Susan Whetnall	(England) Derek Talbot (England) Gillian Perrin	
1971	(Denmark) Svend Pri	(Sweden) Eva Twedberg	(Denmark) Erland Kops (Denmark) Svend Pri	(England) Judy Hashman (England) Gillian Gilks	(England) Derek Talbot (England) Gillian Perrin	
1972	(Sweden) Sture Johnsson	(Sweden) Eva Twedberg	(Denmark) Erland Kops (Denmark) Svend Pri	(England) Judy Hashman (England) Gillian Gilks	(West Germany) Roland Maywald (West Germany) Brigitte Steden	
1973	(Sweden) Sture Johnsson	(England) Gillian Gilks	(England) David Eddy (England) Eddy Sutton	(England) Gillian Gilks (England) Bridget Cooper	(England) Derek Talbot (England) Gillian Gilks	
1974	(Denmark) Svend Pri	(Sweden) Eva Stuart	(England) Ray Stevens (England) Mike Tredgett	(West Germany) Brigitte Steden (West Germany) Marieluise Zizmann	(West Germany) Roland Maywald (West Germany) Brigitte Steden	
1975	(Denmark) Flemming Delfs	(England) Gillian Gilks	(England) Ray Stevens (England) Mike Tredgett	(England) Susan Whetnall (England) Nora Gardner	(England) David Eddy (England) Susan Whetnall	
1976	(Denmark) Flemming Delfs	(England) Gillian Gilks	(Denmark) Flemming Delfs (Denmark) Elo Hansen	(England) Susan Whetnall (England) Gillian Gilks	(England) Derek Talbot (England) Gillian Gilks	
1977	(England) Derek Talbot	(England) Gillian Gilks	(England) David Eddy (England) Eddy Sutton	(Netherlands) Joke van Beusekom (Netherlands) Marjan Ridder	(England) Derek Talbot (England) Gillian Gilks	
1978	(Denmark) Flemming Delfs	(England) Gillian Gilks	(Denmark) Svend Pri (Denmark) Jesper Helledie	(England) Anne Statt (England) Nora Perry	(England) Mike Tredgett (England) Nora Perry	
1979	(Denmark) Flemming Delfs	(England) Gillian Gilks	(England) Derek Talbot (England) Elliot Stuart	(England) Gillian Gilks (Netherlands) Marjan Ridder	(England) Derek Talbot (England) Gillian Gilks	
1980	No competition					
1981	(England) Nick Yates	(Denmark) Lene Køppen	(Scotland) Billy Gilliland (Scotland) Dan Travers	(England) Gillian Gilks (England) Paula Kilvington	(Sweden) Thomas Kihlström (England) Gillian Gilks	
1982	(India) Prakash Padukone	(England) Jane Webster	(England) Martin Dew (England) Mike Tredgett	(England) Gillian Clark (England) Gillian Gilks	(England) Martin Dew (England) Gillian Gilks	
1983	(Denmark) Morten Frost Hansen	(England) Sally Podger	(Denmark) Steen Fladberg (Denmark) Jesper Helledie	(England) Gillian Clark (England) Gillian Gilks	(England) Martin Dew (England) Gillian Gilks	
1984	(Denmark) Jens Peter Nierhoff	(England) Helen Troke	(Denmark) Mark Christiansen (Denmark) Michael Kjeldsen	(England) Karen Beckman (England) Gillian Gilks	(England) Martin Dew (England) Gillian Gilks	
1985	(Denmark) Michael Kjeldsen	(Denmark) Kirsten Larsen	(Denmark) Steen Fladberg (Denmark) Jesper Helledie	(England) Gillian Clark (England) Gillian Gowers	(Denmark) Steen Fladberg (Denmark) Gitte Paulsen	
1986	(Denmark) Ib Frederiksen	(China) Xiao Jie	(China) He Xiangyang (China) Tang Hai	(England) Gillian Gowers (England) Helen Troke	(England) Andy Goode (England) Fiona Elliott	
1987	(Denmark) Poul-Erik Høyer Larsen	(Indonesia) Sarwendah Kusumawardhani	(Denmark) Mark Christiansen (Sweden) Stefan Karlsson	(Sweden) Maria Bengtsson (Sweden) Christine Magnusson	(Sweden) Stefan Karlsson (Sweden) Maria Bengtsson	
1988	(Denmark) Jens Peter Nierhoff	(England) Fiona Smith-Elliot	(Denmark) Michael Kjeldsen (Denmark) Jens Peter Nierhoff	(England) Gillian Clark (England) Sara Sankey	(Denmark) Jesper Knudsen (Denmark) Nettie Nielsen	
1989	(Indonesia) Alan Budikusuma	(Netherlands) Eline Coene	(Indonesia) Rudy Gunawan (Indonesia) Eddy Hartono	(Denmark) Pernille Dupont (Denmark) Grete Mogensen	(Indonesia) Eddy Hartono (Indonesia) Verawaty Fajrin	
1990	(Indonesia) Hermawan Susanto	(Indonesia) Minarti Timur	(Denmark) Jon Holst-Christensen (Denmark) Thomas Lund	(Denmark) Nettie Nielsen (Denmark) Lisbeth Stuer-Lauridsen	(Sweden) Pär-Gunnar Jönsson (Sweden) Maria Bengtsson	
1991	(Denmark) Poul-Erik Høyer Larsen	(Indonesia) Sarwendah Kusumawardhani	(Indonesia) Rudy Gunawan (Indonesia) Eddy Hartono	(England) Gillian Gowers (England) Sara Sankey	(Denmark) Henrik Svarrer (Denmark) Marlene Thomsen	
1992	(Indonesia) Hermawan Susanto	(Indonesia) Sarwendah Kusumawardhani	(Malaysia) Tan Kim Her (Malaysia) Yap Kim Hock	(Denmark) Anne-Mette Bille (Denmark) Marianne Rasmussen	(England) Dave Wright (England) Sara Sankey	
1993	(Denmark) Poul-Erik Høyer Larsen	(Indonesia) Susi Susanti	(Malaysia) Cheah Soon Kit (Malaysia) Soo Beng Kiang	(Indonesia) Finarsih (Indonesia) Lili Tampi	(Sweden) Jan-Eric Antonsson (Sweden) Astrid Crabo	
1994	(Denmark) Poul-Erik Høyer Larsen	(Sweden) Lim Xiaoqing	(Indonesia) Antonius Ariantho (Indonesia) Denny Kantono	(China) Peng Xinyong (China) Zhang Jin	(England) Chris Hunt (England) Gillian Gowers	
1995	No competition					
1996	(China) Sun Jun	(China) Yao Yan	(China) Ge Cheng (China) Tao Xiaoqing	(Netherlands) Eline Coene (Netherlands) Erica van den Heuvel	(Sweden) Jan-Eric Antonsson (Sweden) Astrid Crabo	
1997	(Malaysia) Wong Choong Hann	(Netherlands) Judith Meulendijks	(Denmark) Jens Eriksen (Denmark) Jesper Larsen	(Denmark) Pernille Harder (Wales) Kelly Morgan	(Denmark) Jonas Rasmussen (Denmark) Ann-Lou Jørgensen	
1998	(Malaysia) Roslin Hashim	(China) Zhou Mi	(Malaysia) Cheah Soon Kit (Malaysia) Choong Tan Fook	(China) Huang Nanyan (China) Yang Wei	(Denmark) Jon Holst-Christensen (Denmark) Ann Jørgensen	
1999	(China) Xia Xuanze	(China) Tang Chunyu	(Malaysia) Choong Tan Fook (Malaysia) Lee Wan Wah	(China) Chen Lin (China) Jiang Xuelian	(China) Chen Qiqiu (China) Chen Lin	
2000	(China) Chen Hong	(China) Zhou Mi	(Indonesia) Sigit Budiarto (Indonesia) Halim Haryanto	(Denmark) Helene Kirkegaard (Denmark) Rikke Olsen	(China) Chen Qiqiu (China) Chen Lin	
2001	(Malaysia) Lee Tsuen Seng	(Netherlands) Mia Audina	(Denmark) Jesper Christensen (Denmark) Jesper Larsen	(Russia) Anastasia Russkikh (China) Xu Huaiwen	(England) Nathan Robertson (England) Gail Emms	
2002	(Malaysia) Wong Choong Hann	(Netherlands) Mia Audina	(South Korea) Ha Tae-kwon (South Korea) Kim Dong-moon	(Denmark) Ann-Lou Jørgensen (Denmark) Rikke Olsen	(South Korea) Kim Dong-moon (South Korea) Lee Kyung-won	
2003	(South Korea) Lee Hyun-il	(Netherlands) Yao Jie	(South Korea) Ha Tae-kwon (South Korea) Kim Dong-moon	(South Korea) Lee Kyung-won (South Korea) Ra Kyung-min	(South Korea) Kim Dong-moon (South Korea) Ra Kyung-min	
2004	(Denmark) Kenneth Jonassen	(France) Pi Hongyan	(United States) Howard Bach (United States) Tony Gunawan	(Denmark) Lena Frier Kristiansen (Denmark) Kamilla Rytter Juhl	(Denmark) Thomas Laybourn (Denmark) Kamilla Rytter Juhl	
2005	(Malaysia) Muhammad Hafiz Hashim	(Germany) Xu Huaiwen	(Malaysia) Choong Tan Fook (Malaysia) Lee Wan Wah	(Netherlands) Mia Audina (Netherlands) Lotte Bruil	(Poland) Robert Mateusiak (Poland) Nadieżda Kostiuczyk	
2006	(Malaysia) Sairul Amar Ayob	(Indonesia) Adriyanti Firdasari	(Indonesia) Eng Hian (Indonesia) Rian Sukmawan	(Indonesia) Rani Mundiasti (Indonesia) Endang Nursugianti	(Scotland) Robert Blair (England) Jenny Wallwork	
2007	(Singapore) Kendrick Lee Yen Hui	(China) Li Wenyan	(Indonesia) Rian Sukmawan (Indonesia) Yonathan Suryatama Dasuki	(Russia) Ekaterina Ananina (Russia) Anastasia Russkikh	(Denmark) Rasmus Bonde (Denmark) Christinna Pedersen	
2008	(Indonesia) Andre Kurniawan Tedjono	(Netherlands) Yao Jie	(Indonesia) Fran Kurniawan (Indonesia) Rendra Wijaya	(Denmark) Lena Frier Kristiansen (Denmark) Kamilla Rytter Juhl	(Denmark) Joachim Fischer Nielsen (Denmark) Christinna Pedersen	
2009	(India) Chetan Anand	(Netherlands) Yao Jie	(Germany) Kristof Hopp (Germany) Johannes Schöttler	(Russia) Valeria Sorokina (Russia) Nina Vislova	(Russia) Aleksandr Nikolaenko (Russia) Valeria Sorokina	
2010	(Japan) Sho Sasaki	(Germany) Juliane Schenk	(Japan) Hirokatsu Hashimoto (Japan) Noriyasu Hirata	(Russia) Valeria Sorokina (Russia) Nina Vislova	(Russia) Aleksandr Nikolaenko (Russia) Valeria Sorokina	
2011	(Chinese Taipei) Hsueh Hsuan-yi	(Netherlands) Yao Jie	(Poland) Adam Cwalina (Poland) Michał Łogosz	(Thailand) Duanganong Aroonkesorn (Thailand) Kunchala Voravichitchaikul	(Thailand) Songphon Anugritayawon (Thailand) Kunchala Voravichitchaikul	
2012	(Netherlands) Eric Pang	(Czech Republic) Kristína Gavnholt	(Indonesia) Alvent Yulianto (Indonesia) Markis Kido	(Netherlands) Selena Piek (Netherlands) Iris Tabeling	(Denmark) Mads Pieler Kolding (Denmark) Kamilla Rytter Juhl	
2013	(Hong Kong) Wei Nan	(Thailand) Busanan Ongbamrungphan	(Indonesia) Wahyu Nayaka (Indonesia) Ade Yusuf Santoso	(China) Bao Yixin (China) Tang Jinhua	(Singapore) Danny Bawa Chrisnanta (Singapore) Vanessa Neo	
2014	(India) Ajay Jayaram	(United States) Beiwen Zhang	(France) Baptiste Carême (France) Ronan Labar	(Netherlands) Eefje Muskens (Netherlands) Selena Piek	(Indonesia) Riky Widianto (Indonesia) Richi Puspita Dili	
2015	(India) Ajay Jayaram	(Scotland) Kirsty Gilmour	(Malaysia) Koo Kien Keat (Malaysia) Tan Boon Heong	(Bulgaria) Gabriela Stoeva (Bulgaria) Stefani Stoeva	(France) Ronan Labar (France) Emilie Lefel	
2016	(Chinese Taipei) Wang Tzu-wei	(United States) Beiwen Zhang	(Chinese Taipei) Lee Jhe-huei (Chinese Taipei) Lee Yang	(Australia) Setyana Mapasa (Australia) Gronya Somerville	(Denmark) Mathias Christiansen (Denmark) Sara Thygesen	
2017	(Japan) Kento Momota	(United States) Beiwen Zhang	(Chinese Taipei) Liao Min-chun (Chinese Taipei) Su Ching-heng	(Indonesia) Della Destiara Haris (Indonesia) Rizki Amelia Pradipta	(England) Marcus Ellis (England) Lauren Smith	
2018	(India) Sourabh Verma	(Denmark) Mia Blichfeldt	(Indonesia) Wahyu Nayaka (Indonesia) Ade Yusuf Santoso	(Bulgaria) Gabriela Stoeva (Bulgaria) Stefani Stoeva	(England) Marcus Ellis (England) Lauren Smith	
2019	(India) Lakshya Sen	(China) Wang Zhiyi	(Russia) Vladimir Ivanov (Russia) Ivan Sozonov	(Bulgaria) Gabriela Stoeva (Bulgaria) Stefani Stoeva	(Netherlands) Robin Tabeling (Netherlands) Selena Piek	
2020	Cancelled (Note: This tournament, originally to be played from 6 to 11 October, was later cancelled due to the COVID-19 pandemic in the Netherlands.)					
2021	(Singapore) Loh Kean Yew	(Estonia) Kristin Kuuba	(Singapore) Terry Hee (Singapore) Loh Kean Hean	(Sweden) Johanna Magnusson (Sweden) Clara Nistad	(Denmark) Mikkel Mikkelsen (Denmark) Rikke Søby	
2022	(France) Christo Popov	(Chinese Taipei) Hsu Wen-chi	(Chinese Taipei) Chiu Hsiang-chieh (Chinese Taipei) Yang Ming-tse	(Netherlands) Debora Jille (Netherlands) Cheryl Seinen	(Netherlands) Robin Tabeling (Netherlands) Selena Piek	
2023	(Denmark) Victor Svendsen	(Denmark) Julie Dawall Jakobsen	(England) Rory Easton (England) Zach Russ	(Netherlands) Debora Jille (Netherlands) Cheryl Seinen	(England) Callum Hemming (England) Estelle van Leeuwen	
2024	(Denmark) Mads Christophersen	(Malaysia) Kisona Selvaduray	(Denmark) Rasmus Espersen (Denmark) Christian Faust Kjær	(Bulgaria) Gabriela Stoeva (Bulgaria) Stefani Stoeva	(England) Callum Hemming (England) Estelle van Leeuwen	
2025	(France) Arnaud Merklé	(Chinese Taipei) Huang Ching-ping	(France) Maël Cattoen (France) Lucas Renoir	(France) Elsa Jacob (France) Flavie Vallet	(Denmark) Kristoffer Kolding (Denmark) Mette Werge	
2026	(Chinese Taipei) Su Li-yang	(Germany) Yvonne Li	(Scotland) Christopher Grimley (Scotland) Matthew Grimley	(Germany) Stine Küspert (Germany) Isabel Lohau	(Denmark) Jeppe Søby (Denmark) Sofie Røjkjær	

== Performances by nation ==
As of the 2026 edition

Pos	Nation	MS	WS	MD	WD	XD	Total
1	Denmark	29	15	26.5	19.5	23	113
2	England	5	19	12	23.5	32	91.5
3	Indonesia	9	6	10	3	2	30
4	Malaysia	10	1	9.5		1	21.5
5	Netherlands	2	9		8	2	21
6	China	3	7	2	4.5	2	18.5
7	Sweden	2	4	0.5	2	4.5	13
8	West Germany; Germany		4	1	3	2	10
9	Chinese Taipei	3	2	3			8
9	France	2	1	2	1	1	7
11	Russia			1	3.5	2	6.5
12	India	6					6
12	South Korea	1		2	1	2	6
12	Thailand		2	1.5	1.5	1	6
15	United States		4	1	0.5		5.5
16	Bulgaria				4		4
16	Singapore	2		1		1	4
18	Scotland		1	2		0.5	3.5
19	Japan	2		1			3
20	Poland			1		1	2
21	Czech Republic		1				1
21	Estonia		1				1
21	Hong Kong	1					1
21	Australia				1		1
25	Ireland				0.5		0.5
25	Wales				0.5		0.5
Total		77	77	77	77	77	385

* Host nation
