= 2005 Dutch Open =

2005 Dutch Open may refer to:

- 2005 Dutch Open (badminton)
- 2005 Dutch Open (tennis)
