= Susan Whetnall =

English badminton player

Sue Whetnall
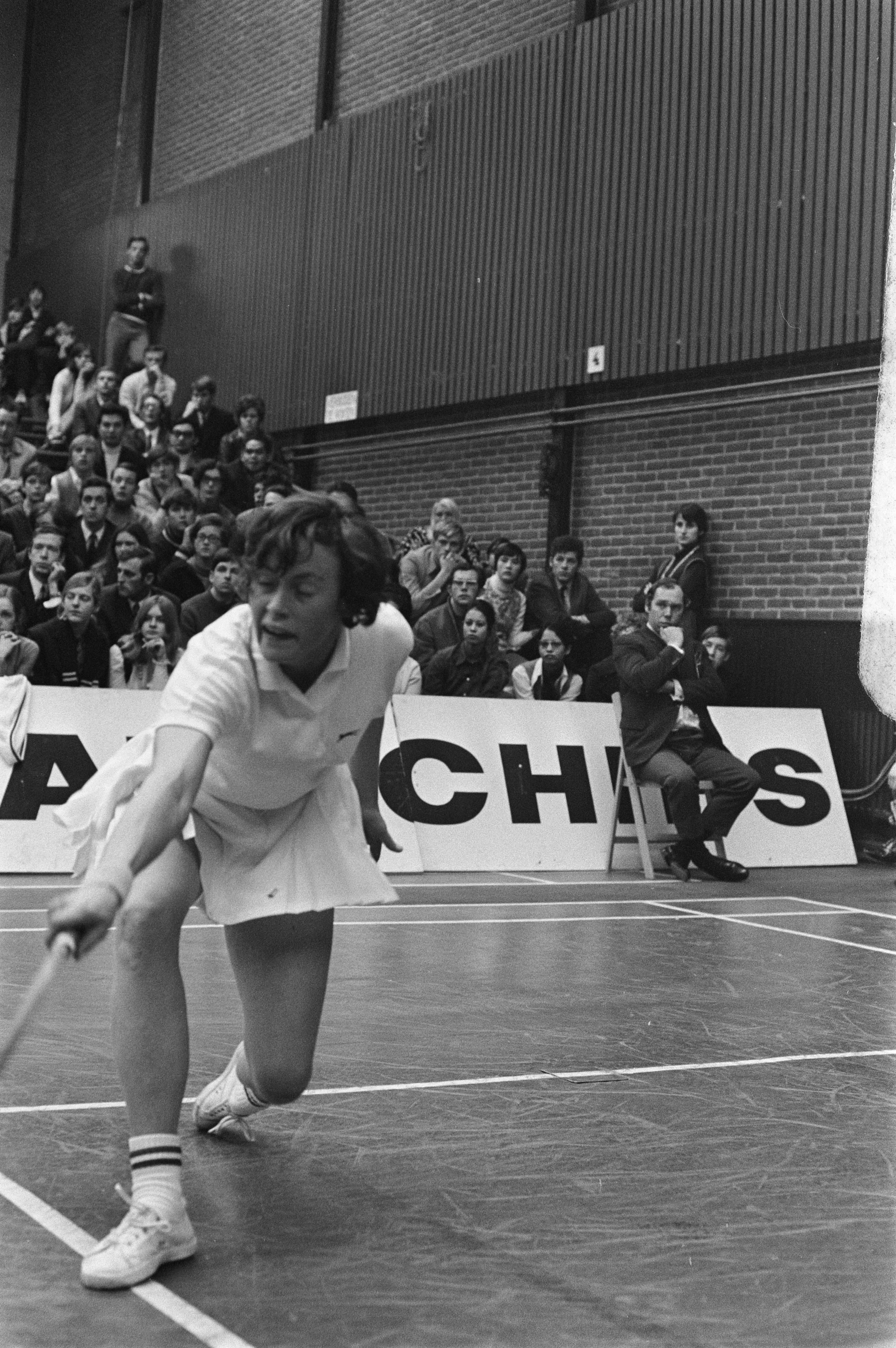
- Whetnall at the 1970 Dutch Open.

Personal information
- Nationality: British (English)
- Born: Susan Pound; 11 December 1942 (age 83) Swanley, Kent, England

Sport
- Sport: Badminton
Medal record
Women's badminton
Representing England
Commonwealth Games
Gold medal – first place	1970 Edinburgh	Women's doubles
Silver medal – second place	1974 Christchurch	Women's doubles
Bronze medal – third place	1970 Edinburgh	Mixed doubles
Bronze medal – third place	1974 Christchurch	Mixed doubles
European Championships
Gold medal – first place	1968 Bochum	Women's doubles
Gold medal – first place	1970 Port Talbot	Women's doubles
Gold medal – first place	1976 Dublin	Women's doubles
Gold medal – first place	1968 Bochum	Mixed doubles
Gold medal – first place	1970 Port Talbot	Mixed doubles
Silver medal – second place	1974 Vienna	Women's doubles
Silver medal – second place	1974 Vienna	Mixed doubles
Bronze medal – third place	1976 Dublin	Women's singles
European Mixed Team Championships
Gold medal – first place	1974 Vienna	Mixed team
Silver medal – second place	1976 Dublin	Mixed team

Susan D. Whetnall (born 11 December 1942, née Susan Pound) is a former English badminton player, noted for her anticipation and shot-making ability, who won numerous international titles in doubles and mixed doubles from the mid-1960s through the mid-1970s. She was married to another English former international player, Paul Whetnall, from 1968 until his death in May 2014.

== Badminton career ==
Born, Susan Pound, she married fellow international player Paul Whetnall in 1968, and competed in her married name thereafter.

Whetnall shared three women's doubles titles (1969, 1970, 1976) and two mixed doubles titles (1968, 1974) at the All-England Championships which was then considered the world's most prestigious tournament for individual players. She represented the England team at the 1970 British Commonwealth Games in Edinburgh, Scotland, where she competed in the badminton events, winning a gold medal in the women's doubles.

Four years later she won two more medals at the 1974 British Commonwealth Games in Christchurch, New Zealand.

Whetnall also won five gold medals, two silver medals and a bronze medal in the European Badminton Championships between 1968 and 1976, making her one of the most successful players ever in this biennial tournament.

She was elected to the Badminton Hall of Fame in 2009.

== Major achievements ==
=== Commonwealth Games ===
Women's doubles
Year	Venue	Partner	Opponent	Score	Result
1970	Meadowbank Stadium, Edinburgh, Scotland	(England) Margaret Boxall	(England) Julie Rickard (England) Gillian Perrin	15–9, 15–2	Gold
1974	Cowles Stadium, Christchurch, New Zealand	(England) Margaret Boxall	(England) Margaret Beck (England) Gillian Perrin	7–15, 5–15	Silver

Mixed doubles
Year	Venue	Partner	Opponent	Score	Result
1970	Meadowbank Stadium, Edinburgh, Scotland	(England) David Eddy	(England) Paul Whetnall (England) Julie Rickard	15–8, 12–15, 15–12	Bronze
1974	Cowles Stadium, Christchurch, New Zealand	(England) Elliot Stuart	(New Zealand) Richard Purser (New Zealand) Alison Branfield	15–10, 15–4	Bronze

=== European Championships ===
Women's singles
Year	Venue	Opponent	Score	Result
1976	Fitzwilliam Club, Dublin, Ireland	(England) Gillian Gilks	5–11, 2–11	Bronze

Women's doubles
Year	Venue	Partner	Opponent	Score	Result
1968	Ruhrlandhalle, Bochum, West Germany	(England) Margaret Boxall	(England) Angela Bairstow (England) Gillian Perrin	15–7, 18–13	Gold
1970	Afan Lido, Port Talbot, Wales	(England) Margaret Boxall	(Germany) Irmgard Latz (Germany) Marieluise Wackerow	2–3 retired	Gold
1974	Stadthalle, Vienna, Austria	(England) Nora Gardner	(England) Margaret Beck (England) Gillian Gilks	10–15, 13–15	Silver
1976	Fitzwilliam Club, Dublin, Ireland	(England) Gillian Gilks	(England) Margaret Beck (England) Nora Gardner	15–4, 15–8	Gold

Mixed doubles
Year	Venue	Partner	Opponent	Score	Result
1968	Ruhrlandhalle, Bochum, West Germany	(England) Tony Jordan	(England) Roger Mills (England) Gillian Perrin	15–13, 15–9	Gold
1970	Afan Lido, Port Talbot, Wales	(England) David Eddy	(England) Derek Talbot (England) Gillian Perrin	17–16, 17–16	Gold
1974	Stadthalle, Vienna, Austria	(England) Elliot Stuart	(England) Derek Talbot (England) Gillian Gilks	15–5, 3–15, 3–15	Silver

=== International tournaments (34 titles, 9 runners-up) ===
Women's singles
Year	Tournament	Opponent	Score	Result
1969	Scottish Open	(England) Margaret Boxall	11–8, 4–11, 10–12	(silver) Runner-up
1970	Dutch Open	(Denmark) Lonny Bostofte	11–6, 6–11, 11–6	(gold) Winner
1975	South African Championships	(South Africa) Deirdre Tyghe	7–11, 11–2, 8–11	(silver) Runner-up

Women's doubles
Year	Tournament	Partner	Opponent	Score	Result
1965	German Open	(England) Veronica Brock	(England) Brenda Parr (England) Ursula Smith	5–15, 16–17	(silver) Runner-up
1967	Irish Open	(England) Margaret Boxall	(England) Gillian Perrin (England) Iris Rogers	15–8, 15–7	(gold) Winner
1968	Scottish Open	(England) Margaret Boxall	(England) Jenny Horton (England) Ursula Smith	9–15, 9–15	(silver) Runner-up
1968	Dutch Open	(England) Margaret Boxall	(England) Angela Bairstow (New Zealand) Alison Glenie	5–15, 15–0, 15–9	(gold) Winner
1968	German Open	(England) Margaret Boxall	(West Germany) Irmgard Latz (West Germany) Marieluise Wackerow	15–6, 15–7	(gold) Winner
1969	All England Open	(England) Margaret Boxall	(Japan) Hiroe Amano (Japan) Tomoko Takahashi	15–11, 15–11	(gold) Winner
1969	Irish Open	(England) Margaret Boxall	(Republic of Ireland) Mary Bryan (Republic of Ireland) Yvonne Kelly	15–3, 15–10	(gold) Winner
1969	South African Championships	(England) Margaret Boxall	(South Africa) Wilma Prade (South Africa) Ann Smith	15–6, 15–4	(gold) Winner
1969	Swedish Open	(England) Margaret Boxall	(Denmark) Anne Flindt (Denmark) Pernille Mølgaard Hansen	4–15, 15–5, 15–10	(gold) Winner
1969	Scottish Open	(England) Margaret Boxall	(Republic of Ireland) Mary Bryan (Republic of Ireland) Yvonne Kelly	15–4, 15–6	(gold) Winner
1970	Belgian International	(England) Margaret Boxall	(Denmark) Imre Rietveld Nielsen (Denmark) Anne Berglund	15–4, 15–6	(gold) Winner
1970	All England Open	(England) Margaret Boxall	(England) Gillian Perrin (England) Julie Rickard	15–6, 8–15, 15–9	(gold) Winner
1970	Canadian Open	(England) Margaret Boxall	(United States) Tyna Barinaga (United States) Caroline Hein	15–5, 5–15, 15–13	(gold) Winner
1970	U.S. Open	(England) Margaret Boxall	(Japan) Machiko Aizawa (Japan) Etsuko Takenaka	10–15, 11–15	(silver) Runner-up
1970	Dutch Open	(England) Margaret Boxall	(Germany) Irmgard Latz (Germany) Marieluise Wackerow	18–15, 12–15, 15–1	(gold) Winner
1970	Scottish Open	(England) Margaret Boxall	(England) Margaret Beck (England) Gillian Perrin	15–2, 15–18, 15–5	(gold) Winner
1974	All England Open	(England) Margaret Boxall	(England) Margaret Beck (England) Gillian Gilks	5–15, 14–18	(silver) Runner-up
1974	Scottish Open	(England) Margaret Boxall	(England) Margaret Beck (England) Gillian Gilks	15–9, 10–15, 15–10	(gold) Winner
1975	Dutch Open	(England) Nora Gardner	(Netherlands) Marjan Luesken (Netherlands) Joke van Beusekom	15–3, 15–5	(gold) Winner
1975	South African Championships	(England) Barbara Giles	(South Africa) Deirdre Tyghe (South Africa) Barbara Lord	12–15, 15–7, 18–17	(gold) Winner
1975	Swedish Open	(England) Barbara Giles	(England) Nora Gardner (England) Gillian Gilks	15–9, 4–15, 15–11	(gold) Winner
1976	U.S. Open	(England) Gillian Gilks	(United States) Pam Bristol Brady (United States) Rosine Jones	15–4, 15–10	(gold) Winner
1976	Scottish Open	(England) Gillian Gilks	(England) Margaret Lockwood (England) Nora Gardner	15–5, 15–2	(gold) Winner
1976	German Open	(England) Gillian Gilks	(England) Margaret Lockwood (England) Jane Webster	15–11, 15–9	(gold) Winner
1976	All England Open	(England) Gillian Gilks	(England) Margaret Lockwood (England) Nora Gardner	15–10, 15–10	(gold) Winner
1976	Dutch Open	(England) Gillian Gilks	(Netherlands) Marjan Luesken (Netherlands) Joke van Beusekom	15–4, 15–5	(gold) Winner

Mixed doubles
Year	Tournament	Partner	Opponent	Score	Result
1968	Scottish Open	(England) Tony Jordan	(Scotland) Robert McCoig (Scotland) Muriel Ferguson	15–8, 17–15	(gold) Winner
1968	German Open	(England) Tony Jordan	(Denmark) Per Walsøe (Denmark) Pernille Mølgaard Hansen	15–10, 18–17	(gold) Winner
1968	All England Open	(England) Tony Jordan	(Scotland) Robert McCoig (Scotland) Muriel Ferguson	15–6, 15–6	(gold) Winner
1969	German Open	(England) Tony Jordan	(Denmark) Per Walsøe (Denmark) Pernille Mølgaard Hansen	15–11, 13–15, 15–10	(gold) Winner
1969	All England Open	(England) Tony Jordan	(England) Roger Mills (England) Gillian Perrin	15–9, 5–15, 12–15	(silver) Runner-up
1969	South African Championships	(England) Tony Jordan	(England) Derek Talbot (England) Gillian Perrin	10–15, 13–15	(silver) Runner-up
1969	Scottish Open	(England) Roger Mills	(Scotland) Robert McCoig (Scotland) Muriel Ferguson	15–4, 15–7	(gold) Winner
1969	Irish Open	(England) Tony Jordan	(England) Roger Mills (England) Gillian Perrin	15–14, 15–13	(gold) Winner
1970	Canadian Open	(Japan) Ippei Kojima	(England) Paul Whetnall (England) Margaret Boxall	12–15, 15–5, 15–13	(gold) Winner
1974	All England Open	(England) David Eddy	(England) Derek Talbot (England) Gillian Gilks	15–6, 15–6	(gold) Winner
1975	Dutch Open	(England) David Eddy	(Germany) Wolfgang Bochow (Germany) Marieluise Zizmann	15–8, 15–3	(gold) Winner
1975	South African Championships	(England) Paul Whetnall	(England) Ray Stevens (England) Barbara Giles	6–15, 15–10, 15–3	(gold) Winner
1975	Swedish Open	(England) Elliot Stuart	(England) Mike Tredgett (England) Nora Gardner	12–15, 6–15	(silver) Runner-up
1976	U.S. Open	(England) David Eddy	(Sweden) Thomas Kihlström (United States) Pam Brady	15–6, 10–15, 15–12	(gold) Winner
