= Irmgard Latz =

German badminton player

Irmgard Gerlatzka
Personal information
- Born: Irmgard Latz; 14 March 1939 (age 87) Guben, Brandenburg, Nazi Germany

Sport
- Country: Germany
- Sport: Badminton
- Career title: European Women's singles champion (1968)
Medal record
Women's badminton
Representing West Germany
European Championships
Gold medal – first place	1968 Bochum	Women's singles
Silver medal – second place	1970 Port Talbot	Women's doubles
Bronze medal – third place	1968 Bochum	Mixed doubles
Bronze medal – third place	1970 Port Talbot	Mixed doubles

Irmgard Gerlatzka (née Latz) (born 14 March 1939) is a German retired badminton player.

== Career ==
Gerlatzka won the women's singles gold medal at the 1968 European Badminton Championships. Two years later, in 1970, she won the silver medal in women's doubles with Marieluise Wackerow, missing out on gold to English pair Margaret Boxall and Susan Whetnall. Gerlatzka reached the All England Open mixed doubles finals in 1970 with partner Wolfgang Bochow.

She won her first women's doubles German national title in 1960 with Ute Melcher.

== Achievements ==
=== European Championships ===
Women's singles

Year	Venue	Opponent	Score	Result
1968	Ruhrlandhalle, Bochum, West Germany	(West Germany) Marieluise Wackerow	11–4, 7–11, 11–6	Gold

Women's doubles

Year	Venue	Partner	Opponent	Score	Result
1970	Afan Lido, Port Talbot, Wales	(West Germany) Marieluise Wackerow	(England) Margaret Boxall (England) Susan Whetnall	2–3, retired	Silver

Mixed doubles

Year	Venue	Partner	Opponent	Score	Result
1968	Ruhrlandhalle, Bochum, West Germany	(West Germany) Wolfgang Bochow	(England) Tony Jordan (England) Susan Whetnall	17–14, 16–18, 11–15	Bronze
1970	Afan Lido, Port Talbot, Wales	(West Germany) Wolfgang Bochow	(England) David Eddy (England) Susan Whetnall	10–15, 8–15	Bronze

=== International tournaments (7 titles, 15 runners-up) ===
Women's singles

Year	Tournament	Opponent	Score	Result
1960	Swiss Open	(Denmark) Annette Schmidt	6–11, 8–11	(silver) Runner-up
1961	Norwegian International	(Norway) Randi Holand	11–4, 11–6	(gold) Winner
1963	French Open	(West Germany) Gerda Schumacher	11–9, 11–3	(gold) Winner
1965	German Open	(England) Ursula Smith	11–7, 3–11, 2–11	(silver) Runner-up
1966	German Open	(Sweden) Eva Twedberg	11–8, 8–11, 12–9	(gold) Winner
1968	Dutch Open	(Denmark) Lizbeth von Barnekow	3–11, 11–5, 11–6	(gold) Winner
1968	German Open	(Sweden) Eva Twedberg	6–11, 11–9, 3–11	(silver) Runner-up
1971	German Open	(Sweden) Eva Twedberg	3–11, 4–11	(silver) Runner-up
1972	Dutch Open	(Sweden) Eva Twedberg	6–11, 12–10, 5–1 match abandoned	(silver) Runner-up
1972	Swedish Open	(Sweden) Eva Twedberg	5–11, 10–12	(silver) Runner-up
1972	German Open	(Sweden) Eva Twedberg	6–11, 4–11	(silver) Runner-up

Women's doubles

Year	Tournament	Partner	Opponent	Score	Result
1960	Swiss Open	(West Germany) Ute Seelbach	(West Germany) Elfriede Becker (West Germany) Ute Harlos	15–9, 15–3	(gold) Winner
1961	German Open	(West Germany) Hannelore Schmidt	(New Zealand) Sonia Cox (United States) Judy Hashman	5–15, 6–15	(silver) Runner-up
1963	Norwegian International	(West Germany) Heidi Menacher	(Denmark) Lizbeth von Barnekow (Denmark) Liselotte Nielsen	15–2, 5–15, 10–15	(silver) Runner-up
1963	French Open	(Netherlands) Imre Rietveld	(Denmark) Bitten Nielsen (Belgium) June van der Willigen	15–6, 15–4	(gold) Winner
1964	German Open	(Netherlands) Imre Rietveld	(England) Angela Bairstow (England) Jenny Pritchard	8–15, 8–15	(silver) Runner-up
1967	German Open	(West Germany) Marieluise Wackerow	(Denmark) Lizbeth von Barnekow (Denmark) Ulla Strand	18–14, 9–15, 15–9	(gold) Winner
1968	German Open	(West Germany) Marieluise Wackerow	(England) Margaret Boxall (England) Susan Pound	6–15, 7–15	(silver) Runner-up
1970	Dutch Open	(West Germany) Marieluise Wackerow	(England) Margaret Boxall (England) Susan Whetnall	15–18, 15–12, 1–15	(silver) Runner-up
1972	Dutch Open	(West Germany) Marieluise Wackerow	(England) Gillian Gilks (England) Judy Hashman	16–18, 5–15	(silver) Runner-up

Mixed doubles

Year	Tournament	Partner	Opponent	Score	Result
1966	German Open	(West Germany) Wolfgang Bochow	(Denmark) Morten Pommergaard (Denmark) Ulla Strand	6–15, 8–15	(silver) Runner-up
1970	All England Open	(West Germany) Wolfgang Bochow	(Denmark) Per Walsøe (Denmark) Pernille Mølgaard Hansen	14–17, 12–15	(silver) Runner-up

== Sources ==
- Martin Knupp: Deutscher Badminton Almanach, Deutscher Badminton-Verband (2003), 230 pages
