= European Badminton Championships =

Badminton championships

The European Badminton Championships is a tournament organized by the Badminton Europe (BE). It represents the highest level of continental competition in European badminton, and the winners of each event are recognised as the European champions.

== History ==
The first of these competitions was held in 1968. The competition was held once every two years to determine the best badminton players in Europe. European Mixed Team Badminton Championships usually started prior to the individual championships until it was split in 2009. From 2017 on the European badminton championship is held annually except for the year with European Games - the badminton program at those Games will operate as that years Championships. Since 2008, it is being graded as a Grand Prix Gold tournament by the Badminton World Federation.

== Championships ==
The table below gives an overview of all host cities and countries of the European Championships. On 15 January 2008, Manchester of England won the bid to stage the 2010 event which saw the separation the team event into different championships. Starting from 2017, the championship will be an annual event except for the year with European Games. The 2020 edition in Kyiv, Ukraine, had to be cancelled due to COVID-19 pandemic and the hosting rights of the 2021 edition was reallocated to Ukraine again. The number in parentheses following the city/country denotes how many times that city/country has hosted the championships.

Host cities of the European Badminton Championships

Year	Number	Host City	Events
1968	1	Bochum, West Germany (1)	5
1970	2	Port Talbot, Wales (1)	5
1972	3	Karlskrona, Sweden (1)	6
1974	4	Vienna, Austria (1)	6
1976	5	Dublin, Ireland (1)	6
1978	6	Preston, England (1)	6
1980	7	Groningen, Netherlands (1)	6
1982	8	Böblingen, West Germany (1)	6
1984	9	Preston, England (2)	6
1986	10	Uppsala, Sweden (1)	6
1988	11	Kristiansand, Norway (1)	6
1990	12	Moscow, Soviet Union (1)	6
1992	13	Glasgow, Scotland (1)	6
1994	14	Den Bosch, Netherlands (1)	6
1996	15	Herning, Denmark (1)	6
1998	16	Sofia, Bulgaria (1)	6

Year	Number	Host City	Events
2000	17	Glasgow, Scotland (2)	6
2002	18	Malmö, Sweden (1)	6
2004	19	Geneva, Switzerland (1)	6
2006	20	Den Bosch, Netherlands (2)	6
2008	21	Herning, Denmark (2)	5
2010	22	Manchester, England (1)	5
2012	23	Karlskrona, Sweden (2)	5
2014	24	Kazan, Russia (1)	5
2016	25	La Roche-sur-Yon, France (1)	5
2017	26	Kolding, Denmark (1)	5
2018	27	Huelva, Spain (1)	5
2021	28	Kyiv, Ukraine (1) (Note: This tournament, originally to be played from 21 to 26 April 2020, was later postponed due to COVID-19 pandemic in Ukraine.)	5
2022	29	Madrid, Spain (1)	5
2024	30	Saarbrücken, Germany (1)	5
2025	31	Horsens, Denmark (1)	5
2026	32	Huelva, Spain (2)	5

== Past winners ==
=== Individual events (1968–present) ===
Year	Men's singles	Women's singles	Men's doubles	Women's doubles	Mixed doubles
1968	(Sweden) Sture Johnsson	(West Germany) Irmgard Latz	(England) David Eddy (England) Roger Powell	(England) Margaret Boxall (England) Susan Whetnall	(England) Tony Jordan (England) Susan Whetnall
1970	(Sweden) Sture Johnsson	(Sweden) Eva Twedberg	(Denmark) Elo Hansen (Denmark) Per Walsøe	(England) Margaret Boxall (England) Susan Whetnall	(England) David Eddy (England) Susan Whetnall
1972	(West Germany) Wolfgang Bochow	(England) Margaret Beck	(West Germany) Willi Braun (West Germany) Roland Maywald	(England) Gillian Gilks (England) Judy Hashman	(England) Derek Talbot (England) Gillian Gilks
1974	(Sweden) Sture Johnsson	(England) Gillian Gilks	(West Germany) Willi Braun (West Germany) Roland Maywald	(England) Margaret Beck (England) Gillian Gilks	(England) Derek Talbot (England) Gillian Gilks
1976	(Denmark) Flemming Delfs	(England) Gillian Gilks	(England) Ray Stevens (England) Mike Tredgett	(England) Gillian Gilks (England) Susan Whetnall	(England) Derek Talbot (England) Gillian Gilks
1978	(Denmark) Flemming Delfs	(Denmark) Lene Køppen	(England) Ray Stevens (England) Mike Tredgett	(England) Nora Perry (England) Anne Statt	(England) Mike Tredgett (England) Nora Perry
1980	(Denmark) Flemming Delfs	(Switzerland) Liselotte Blumer	(Sweden) Stefan Karlsson (Sweden) Claes Nordin	(England) Nora Perry (England) Jane Webster	(England) Mike Tredgett (England) Nora Perry
1982	(Denmark) Jens Peter Nierhoff	(Denmark) Lene Køppen	(Sweden) Stefan Karlsson (Sweden) Thomas Kihlström	(England) Gillian Gilks (England) Gillian Clark	(England) Martin Dew (England) Gillian Gilks
1984	(Denmark) Morten Frost	(England) Helen Troke	(England) Martin Dew (England) Mike Tredgett	(England) Karen Chapman (England) Gillian Clark	(England) Martin Dew (England) Gillian Gilks
1986	(Denmark) Morten Frost	(England) Helen Troke	(Denmark) Steen Fladberg (Denmark) Jesper Helledie	(England) Gillian Clark (England) Gillian Gowers	(England) Martin Dew (England) Gillian Gilks
1988	(England) Darren Hall	(Denmark) Kirsten Larsen	(Denmark) Jens Peter Nierhoff (Denmark) Michael Kjeldsen	(Denmark) Dorte Kjær (Denmark) Nettie Nielsen	(Denmark) Steen Fladberg (England) Gillian Clark
1990	(England) Steve Baddeley	(Denmark) Pernille Nedergaard	(Denmark) Jan Paulsen (Denmark) Henrik Svarrer	(Denmark) Dorte Kjær (Denmark) Nettie Nielsen	(Denmark) Jon Holst-Christensen (Denmark) Grete Mogensen
1992	(Denmark) Poul-Erik Høyer Larsen	(Denmark) Pernille Nedergaard	(Denmark) Jon Holst-Christensen (Denmark) Thomas Lund	(Sweden) Lim Xiaoqing (Sweden) Christine Magnusson	(Denmark) Thomas Lund (Denmark) Pernille Dupont
1994	(Denmark) Poul-Erik Høyer Larsen	(Sweden) Lim Xiaoqing	(England) Simon Archer (England) Chris Hunt	(Sweden) Lim Xiaoqing (Sweden) Christine Magnusson	(Denmark) Michael Søgaard (Sweden) Catrine Bengtsson
1996	(Denmark) Poul-Erik Høyer Larsen	(Denmark) Camilla Martin	(Denmark) Jon Holst-Christensen (Denmark) Thomas Lund	(Denmark) Lisbeth Stuer-Lauridsen (Denmark) Marlene Thomsen	(Denmark) Michael Søgaard (Denmark) Rikke Olsen
1998	(Denmark) Peter Gade	(Denmark) Camilla Martin	(England) Simon Archer (England) Chris Hunt	(Denmark) Rikke Olsen (Denmark) Marlene Thomsen	(Denmark) Michael Søgaard (Denmark) Rikke Olsen
2000	(Denmark) Peter Gade	(Denmark) Camilla Martin	(Denmark) Jens Eriksen (Denmark) Jesper Larsen	(England) Donna Kellogg (England) Joanne Goode	(Denmark) Michael Søgaard (Denmark) Rikke Olsen
2002	(Denmark) Peter Rasmussen	(Netherlands) Yao Jie	(Denmark) Jens Eriksen (Denmark) Martin Lundgaard Hansen	(Denmark) Jane F. Bramsen (Denmark) Ann-Lou Jørgensen	(Denmark) Jens Eriksen (Denmark) Mette Schjoldager
2004	(Denmark) Peter Gade	(Netherlands) Mia Audina	(Denmark) Jens Eriksen (Denmark) Martin Lundgaard Hansen	(Netherlands) Mia Audina (Netherlands) Lotte Bruil-Jonathans	(England) Nathan Robertson (England) Gail Emms
2006	(Denmark) Peter Gade	(Germany) Xu Huaiwen	(Denmark) Jens Eriksen (Denmark) Martin Lundgaard Hansen	(England) Gail Emms (England) Donna Kellogg	(Denmark) Thomas Laybourn (Denmark) Kamilla Rytter Juhl
2008	(Denmark) Kenneth Jonassen	(Germany) Xu Huaiwen	(Denmark) Lars Paaske (Denmark) Jonas Rasmussen	(Denmark) Lena Frier Kristiansen (Denmark) Kamilla Rytter Juhl	(England) Anthony Clark (England) Donna Kellogg
2010	(Denmark) Peter Gade	(Denmark) Tine Baun	(Denmark) Lars Paaske (Denmark) Jonas Rasmussen	(Russia) Valeria Sorokina (Russia) Nina Vislova	(Denmark) Thomas Laybourn (Denmark) Kamilla Rytter Juhl
2012	(Germany) Marc Zwiebler	(Denmark) Tine Baun	(Denmark) Mathias Boe (Denmark) Carsten Mogensen	(Denmark) Christinna Pedersen (Denmark) Kamilla Rytter Juhl	(Poland) Robert Mateusiak (Poland) Nadieżda Zięba
2014	(Denmark) Jan Ø. Jørgensen	(Spain) Carolina Marín	(Russia) Vladimir Ivanov (Russia) Ivan Sozonov	(Denmark) Christinna Pedersen (Denmark) Kamilla Rytter Juhl	(Denmark) Joachim Fischer Nielsen (Denmark) Christinna Pedersen
2016	(Denmark) Viktor Axelsen	(Spain) Carolina Marín	(Denmark) Mads Conrad-Petersen (Denmark) Mads Pieler Kolding	(Denmark) Christinna Pedersen (Denmark) Kamilla Rytter Juhl	(Denmark) Joachim Fischer Nielsen (Denmark) Christinna Pedersen
2017	(England) Rajiv Ouseph	(Spain) Carolina Marín	(Denmark) Mathias Boe (Denmark) Carsten Mogensen	(Denmark) Christinna Pedersen (Denmark) Kamilla Rytter Juhl	(England) Chris Adcock (England) Gabby Adcock
2018	(Denmark) Viktor Axelsen	(Spain) Carolina Marín	(Denmark) Kim Astrup (Denmark) Anders Skaarup Rasmussen	(Bulgaria) Gabriela Stoeva (Bulgaria) Stefani Stoeva	(England) Chris Adcock (England) Gabby Adcock
2021	(Denmark) Anders Antonsen	(Spain) Carolina Marín	(Russia) Vladimir Ivanov (Russia) Ivan Sozonov	(Bulgaria) Gabriela Stoeva (Bulgaria) Stefani Stoeva	(Russia) Rodion Alimov (Russia) Alina Davletova
2022	(Denmark) Viktor Axelsen	(Spain) Carolina Marín	(Germany) Mark Lamsfuß (Germany) Marvin Seidel	(Bulgaria) Gabriela Stoeva (Bulgaria) Stefani Stoeva	(Germany) Mark Lamsfuß (Germany) Isabel Lohau
2024	(Denmark) Anders Antonsen	(Spain) Carolina Marín	(Denmark) Kim Astrup (Denmark) Anders Skaarup Rasmussen	(France) Margot Lambert (France) Anne Tran	(France) Thom Gicquel (France) Delphine Delrue
2025	(France) Alex Lanier	(Denmark) Line Kjærsfeldt	(France) Christo Popov (France) Toma Junior Popov	(Bulgaria) Gabriela Stoeva (Bulgaria) Stefani Stoeva	(Denmark) Jesper Toft (Denmark) Amalie Magelund
2026	(France) Christo Popov	(Scotland) Kirsty Gilmour	(England) Ben Lane (England) Sean Vendy	(Bulgaria) Gabriela Stoeva (Bulgaria) Stefani Stoeva	(Denmark) Mathias Christiansen (Denmark) Alexandra Bøje

=== Mixed team event (1972–2006) ===
Year	Mixed team
1972	England
1974	England
1976	Denmark
1978	England
1980	Denmark
1982	England
1984	England
1986	Denmark
1988	Denmark
1990	Denmark
1992	Sweden
1994	Sweden
1996	Denmark
1998	Denmark
2000	Denmark
2002	Denmark
2004	Denmark
2006	Denmark

== Performances by nation ==
As of finals of the 2026 edition

Pos	Nation	MS	WS	MD	WD	XD	XT	Total
1	Denmark	22	11	17	10	13	11	84
2	England	3	5	7	12	14.5	5	46.5
3	Sweden	3	2	2	2	0.5	2	11.5
4	Germany	2	3	3	0	1	0	9
5	Spain	0	7	0	0	0	0	7
6	Bulgaria	0	0	0	5	0	0	5
6	France	2	0	1	1	1	0	5
7	Russia	0	0	2	1	1	0	4
9	Netherlands	0	2	0	1	0	0	3
10	Poland	0	0	0	0	1	0	1
10	Scotland	0	1	0	0	0	0	1
10	Switzerland	0	1	0	0	0	0	1
Total		32	32	32	32	32	18	178

- Include Mixed Team Event (1972–2006)

== Medal count ==
As of finals of the 2026 edition

Rank	Nation	Gold	Silver	Bronze	Total
1	Denmark	84	74	105.5	263.5
2	England	46.5	41	63	150.5
3	Sweden	11.5	19	48	78.5
4	Germany	9	11	30	50
5	Spain	7	0	0	7
6	France	5	8	11	24
7	Bulgaria	5	3	2	10
8	Russia	4	4	11	19
9	Netherlands	3	8	34.5	45.5
10	Scotland	1	6	8	15
11	Poland	1	2	7	10
12	Switzerland	1	0	1	2
13	Turkey	0	1	6	7
14	Wales	0	1	3	4
15	Finland	0	0	2	2
16	Belgium	0	0	1	1
16	Croatia	0	0	1	1
16	Hungary	0	0	1	1
16	Ireland	0	0	1	1
16	Israel	0	0	1	1
16	Ukraine	0	0	1	1
Totals (21 entries)		178	178	338	694

- Russian medals included medals won by the USSR and the CIS
- German medals included medals won by West Germany
- Include Mixed Team Event (1972–2006)

== Successful players ==
Below is the list of the most ever successful players in the European Badminton Championships:

Name	MS	WS	MD	WD	XD	Total
(England) Gillian Gilks		2		4	6	12
(Denmark) Kamilla Rytter Juhl				5	2	7
(Spain) Carolina Marín		7				7
(Denmark) Christinna Pedersen				4	2	6
(Denmark) Peter Gade	5					5
(Bulgaria) Gabriela Stoeva				5		5
(Bulgaria) Stefani Stoeva				5		5
(England) Susan Whetnall				3	2	5
(England) Mike Tredgett			3		2	5
(Denmark) Jens Eriksen			4		1	5
(England) Nora Perry				2	2	4
(England) Gillian Clark				3	1	4
(England) Martin Dew			1		3	4
(Denmark) Michael Søgaard					4	4
(Denmark) Rikke Olsen				1	3	4
