= 1974 European Badminton Championships =

Tournament details
- Dates: 16–20 April
- Edition: 4
- Venue: Stadthalle
- Location: Vienna, Austria

The 4th European Badminton Championships were held in Vienna, Austria, between 16 and 20 April 1974, and hosted by the European Badminton Union and the Österreichischer Badminton Verband.

== Medalists ==
Event	Gold	Silver	Bronze
Men's singles	(Sweden) Sture Johnsson	(Sweden) Thomas Kihlström	(Denmark) Flemming Delfs
Men's singles	(Sweden) Sture Johnsson	(Sweden) Thomas Kihlström	(England) Derek Talbot
Women's singles	(England) Gillian Gilks	(Denmark) Lene Køppen	(Netherlands) Joke van Beusekom
Women's singles	(England) Gillian Gilks	(Denmark) Lene Køppen	(England) Margaret Beck
Men's doubles	(West Germany) Willi Braun and Roland Maywald	(Denmark) Svend Pri and Poul Petersen	(England) Ray Stevens and Mike Tredgett
Men's doubles	(West Germany) Willi Braun and Roland Maywald	(Denmark) Svend Pri and Poul Petersen	(Denmark) Elo Hansen and Flemming Delfs
Women's doubles	(England) Gillian Gilks and Margaret Beck	(England) Susan Whetnall and Nora Gardner	(Denmark) Pernille Kaagaard and Ulla Strand
Women's doubles	(England) Gillian Gilks and Margaret Beck	(England) Susan Whetnall and Nora Gardner	(Netherlands) Joke van Beusekom and Marjan Luesken
Mixed doubles	(England) Derek Talbot and Gillian Gilks	(England) Elliot Stuart and Susan Whetnall	(West Germany) Wolfgang Bochow and Marieluise Zizmann
Mixed doubles	(England) Derek Talbot and Gillian Gilks	(England) Elliot Stuart and Susan Whetnall	(England) Mike Tredgett and Barbara Giles
Teams	England	Denmark	Sweden

== Results ==
=== Semi-finals ===
Category	Winner	Runner-up	Score
Men's singles	(Sweden) Sture Johnsson	(Denmark) Flemming Delfs	4–15, 15–6, 15–8
Men's singles	(Sweden) Thomas Kihlström	(England) Derek Talbot	15–5, 17–16
Women's singles	(England) Gillian Gilks	(Netherlands) Joke van Beusekom	11–3, 11–1
Women's singles	(Denmark) Lene Køppen	(England) Margaret Beck	11–6, 10–12, 11–7
Men's doubles	(Denmark) Poul Petersen (Denmark) Svend Pri	(England) Mike Tredgett (England) Ray Stevens	15–8, 15–8
Men's doubles	(West Germany) Roland Maywald (West Germany) Willi Braun	(Denmark) Flemming Delfs (Denmark) Elo Hansen	15–8, 15–6
Women's doubles	(England) Nora Gardner (England) Susan Whetnall	(Denmark) Pernille Kaagaard (Denmark) Ulla Strand	15–8, 15–12
Women's doubles	(England) Gillian Gilks (England) Margaret Beck	(Netherlands) Joke van Beusekom (Netherlands) Marjan Luesken	15–9, 15–5
Mixed doubles	(England) Elliot Stuart (England) Susan Whetnall	(West Germany) Wolfgang Bochow (West Germany) Marieluise Zizmann	15–3, 15–3
Mixed doubles	(England) Derek Talbot (England) Gillian Gilks	(England) Mike Tredgett (England) Barbara Giles	15–0, 15–11

=== Finals ===
Category	Winners	Runners-up	Score
Men's singles	(Sweden) Sture Johnsson	(Sweden) Thomas Kihlström	15–7, 15–8
Women's singles	(England) Gillian Gilks	(Denmark) Lene Køppen	11–6, 11–5
Men's doubles	(West Germany) Roland Maywald (West Germany) Willi Braun	(Denmark) Poul Petersen (Denmark) Svend Pri	15–8, 11–15, 15–13
Women's doubles	(England) Gillian Gilks (England) Margaret Beck	(England) Nora Gardner (England) Susan Whetnall	15–10, 15–13
Mixed doubles	(England) Derek Talbot (England) Gillian Gilks	(England) Elliot Stuart (England) Susan Whetnall	5–15, 15–3, 15–3

== Medal account ==
* Host nation (Austria)

Rank	Nation	Gold	Silver	Bronze	Total
1	England	4	2	4	10
2	Sweden	1	1	1	3
3	West Germany	1	0	1	2
4	Denmark	0	3	3	6
5	Netherlands	0	0	2	2
Totals (5 entries)		6	6	11	23
