= 1968 European Badminton Championships =

Tournament details
- Dates: 19–21 April
- Edition: 1
- Venue: Ruhrlandhalle
- Location: Bochum, West Germany

The 1st European Badminton Championships were held in Bochum, West Germany, between 19 and 21 April 1968, and hosted by the European Badminton Union and the Deutscher Badminton-Verband e.V.

== Medal summary ==
=== Medalists ===
Event	Gold	Silver	Bronze
Men's singles	(Sweden) Sture Johnsson	(West Germany) Wolfgang Bochow	(Denmark) Elo Hansen
Men's singles	(Sweden) Sture Johnsson	(West Germany) Wolfgang Bochow	(Denmark) Jørgen Mortensen
Women's singles	(West Germany) Irmgard Latz	(West Germany) Marieluise Wackerow	(Sweden) Eva Twedberg
Women's singles	(West Germany) Irmgard Latz	(West Germany) Marieluise Wackerow	(England) Angela Bairstow
Men's doubles	(England) David Eddy and Roger Powell	(England) Tony Jordan and Roger Mills	(Scotland) Robert McCoig and Mac Henderson
Men's doubles	(England) David Eddy and Roger Powell	(England) Tony Jordan and Roger Mills	(West Germany) Franz Beinvogl and Willi Braun
Women's doubles	(England) Margaret Boxall and Susan Whetnall	(England) Angela Bairstow and Gillian Perrin	(Netherlands) Agnes Geene and Joke van Beusekom
Women's doubles	(England) Margaret Boxall and Susan Whetnall	(England) Angela Bairstow and Gillian Perrin	(Denmark) Anne Flindt and Bente Sørensen
Mixed doubles	(England) Tony Jordan and Susan Whetnall	(England) Roger Mills and Gillian Perrin	(West Germany) Wolfgang Bochow and Irmgard Latz
Mixed doubles	(England) Tony Jordan and Susan Whetnall	(England) Roger Mills and Gillian Perrin	(Denmark) Klaus Kaagaard and Anne Flindt

=== Medal table ===
* Host nation (West Germany)

Rank	Nation	Gold	Silver	Bronze	Total
1	England	3	3	1	7
2	West Germany*	1	2	2	5
3	Sweden	1	0	1	2
4	Denmark	0	0	4	4
5	Netherlands	0	0	1	1
5	Scotland	0	0	1	1
Totals (6 entries)		5	5	10	20

== Results ==
=== Men's singles ===
First round
(Denmark) Elo Hansen	15	15
(Socialist Federal Republic of Yugoslavia) Dance Pohar	2	2
(Germany) Willi Braun	17	15
(Republic of Ireland) C. W. Wilkinson	15	4
(England) Roger Mills	15	10	15
(Czechoslovakia) Ivan Bareš	3	15	7
(Austria) Hermann Fröhlich	15	15
(Wales) Howard Jennings	12	6
(Germany) Wolfgang Bochow	15	15
(Switzerland) Heinz Honegger	9	3
(Austria) Reinhold Pum	15	15
(Republic of Ireland) Samuel Blair	8	8
(Sweden) Kurt Johnsson	15	15
(Scotland) Mac Henderson	2	1
(Netherlands) Ruud van Ginneken	7	18	9
(England) David Eddy	15	13	15

Second round
(Sweden) Sture Johnsson	15	15
(Switzerland) Jürg Honegger	7	1
(Scotland) Robert McCoig	15	15
(Netherlands) Huub van Ginneken	5	7
(Denmark) Elo Hansen	15	15
(Germany) Willi Braun	12	11
(England) Roger Mills	15	15
(Austria) Hermann Fröhlich	7	5
(Denmark) Jørgen Mortensen	15	15
(Czechoslovakia) Jiří Král	5	1
(Wales) Peter Seaman	13	15	15
(Socialist Federal Republic of Yugoslavia) Tomaz Pavcic	15	5	7
(Germany) Wolfgang Bochow	15	15
(Austria) Reinhold Pum	9	1
(Sweden) Kurt Johnsson	15	15
(England) David Eddy	0	7

Quarterfinals
(Sweden) Sture Johnsson	15	15
(Scotland) Robert McCoig	6	5
(Denmark) Elo Hansen	15	14	15
(England) Roger Mills	6	17	8
(Denmark) Jørgen Mortensen	15	15
(Wales) Peter Seaman	1	8
(Germany) Wolfgang Bochow	15	10	15
(Sweden) Kurt Johnsson	12	15	3

Semifinals
(Sweden) Sture Johnsson	15	11	15
(Denmark) Elo Hansen	4	15	12
(Denmark) Jørgen Mortensen	11	15	9
(Germany) Wolfgang Bochow	15	7	15

Final
(Sweden) Sture Johnsson	17	11	15
(Germany) Wolfgang Bochow	14	15	5

=== Women's singles ===
Semifinals
(Sweden) Eva Twedberg	11	10	0
(Germany) Marieluise Wackerow	5	12	11
(England) Angela Bairstow	9	2
(Germany) Irmgard Latz	12	11

Final
(Germany) Marieluise Wackerow	4	11	6
(Germany) Irmgard Latz	11	7	11

=== Men's doubles ===
Semifinals
(England) David Eddy (England) Roger Powell	15	10	17
(Scotland) Robert McCoig (Scotland) Mac Henderson	13	15	16
(West Germany) Franz Beinvogl (West Germany) Willi Braun	4	15	6
(England) Tony Jordan (England) Roger Mills	15	9	15

Final
(England) David Eddy (England) Roger Powell	7	15	15
(England) Tony Jordan (England) Roger Mills	15	13	5

=== Women's doubles ===
Semifinals
(England) Angela Bairstow (England) Gillian Perrin	15	15
(Netherlands) Agnes Geene (Netherlands) Joke van Beusekom	8	4
(England) Margaret Boxall (England) Susan Whetnall	15	18
(Denmark) Anne Flindt (Denmark) Bente Flindt Sørensen	7	13

Final
(England) Angela Bairstow (England) Gillian Perrin	7	13
(England) Margaret Boxall (England) Susan Whetnall	15	18

=== Mixed doubles ===
Semifinals
(England) Tony Jordan (England) Susan Whetnall	14	18	15
(West Germany) Wolfgang Bochow (West Germany) Irmgard Latz	17	16	11
(England) Roger Mills (England) Gillian Perrin	15	10	15
(Denmark) Klaus Kaagaard (Denmark) Anne Flindt	1	15	8

Final
(England) Tony Jordan (England) Susan Whetnall	15	15
(England) Roger Mills (England) Gillian Perrin	13	9
