= 1970 European Badminton Championships =

Tournament details
- Dates: 17–19 April
- Edition: 2
- Venue: Afan Lido
- Location: Port Talbot, Wales

The 2nd European Badminton Championships were held in Port Talbot, Wales, between 17 and 19 April 1970, and hosted by the European Badminton Union and the Welsh Badminton Union.

== Medalists ==
Event	Gold	Silver	Bronze
Men's singles	(Sweden) Sture Johnsson	(Denmark) Elo Hansen	(England) Paul Whetnall
Men's singles	(Sweden) Sture Johnsson	(Denmark) Elo Hansen	(West Germany) Wolfgang Bochow
Women's singles	(Sweden) Eva Twedberg	(Denmark) Imre Nielsen	(Denmark) Lisbeth van Barnekow
Women's singles	(Sweden) Eva Twedberg	(Denmark) Imre Nielsen	(England) Margaret Boxall
Men's doubles	(Denmark) Elo Hansen and Per Walsøe	(Denmark) Erland Kops and Henning Borch	(West Germany) Siegfried Betz and Roland Maywald
Men's doubles	(Denmark) Elo Hansen and Per Walsøe	(Denmark) Erland Kops and Henning Borch	(England) David Eddy and Roger Powell
Women's doubles	(England) Margaret Boxall and Susan Whetnall	(West Germany) Irmgard Latz and Marieluise Wackerow	(Denmark) Karin Jørgensen and Anne Berglund
Women's doubles	(England) Margaret Boxall and Susan Whetnall	(West Germany) Irmgard Latz and Marieluise Wackerow	(England) Gillian Perrin and Margaret Beck
Mixed doubles	(England) David Eddy and Susan Whetnall	(England) Derek Talbot and Gillian Perrin	(Denmark) Per Walsøe and Anne Berglund
Mixed doubles	(England) David Eddy and Susan Whetnall	(England) Derek Talbot and Gillian Perrin	(West Germany) Wolfgang Bochow and Irmgard Latz

== Semifinals ==
- An overview of most of the semifinal results.

Discipline	Winner	Runner-up	Score
Men's singles	(Sweden) Sture Johnsson	(West Germany) Wolfgang Bochow	15–3, 14–15, 15–10
Men's singles	(Denmark) Elo Hansen	(England) Paul Whetnall	15–9, 15–2
Women's singles	(Denmark) Imre Rietveld	(England) Margaret Boxall	11–9, 7–11, 11–3
Women's singles	(Sweden) Eva Twedberg	(Denmark) Lisbeth van Bernekow	11–6, 11–4
Men's doubles	(Denmark) Erland Kops (Denmark) Henning Borch	(England) David Eddy (England) Roger Powell	15–8, 15–5
Men's doubles	(Denmark) Elo Hansen (Denmark) Per Walsøe	(West Germany) Siegfried Betz (West Germany) Roland Maywald	6–15, 15–7, 17–14
Women's doubles	(West Germany) Irmgard Latz (West Germany) Marieluise Wackerow	(England) Margaret Beck (England) Gillian Perrin	15–13, 9–15, 15–3
Women's doubles	(England) Margaret Boxall (England) Susan Whetnall	(Denmark) Anne Berglund (Denmark) Karin Jørgensen	15–10, 15–8
Mixed doubles	(England) Derek Talbot (England) Gillian Perrin	(Denmark) Per Walsøe (Denmark) Anne Berglund	14–18, 15–11, 15–7
Mixed doubles	(England) David Eddy (England) Susan Whetnall	(West Germany) Wolfgang Bochow (West Germany) Irmgard Latz	15–10, 15–8

== Finals ==
Category	Winners	Runners-up	Score
Men's singles	(Sweden) Sture Johnsson	(Denmark) Elo Hansen	15–5, 15–6
Women's singles	(Sweden) Eva Twedberg	(Denmark) Imre Nielsen	11–8, 10–12, 12–10
Men's doubles	(Denmark) Elo Hansen (Denmark) Per Walsøe	(Denmark) Erland Kops (Denmark) Henning Borch	15–9, 2–15, 15–10
Women's doubles	(England) Margaret Boxall (England) Susan Whetnall	(West Germany) Irmgard Latz (West Germany) Marieluise Wackerow	2–3, retired
Mixed doubles	(England) David Eddy (England) Susan Whetnall	(England) Derek Talbot (England) Gillian Perrin	17–16, 17–16

== Medal account ==
* Host nation (Wales)

Rank	Nation	Gold	Silver	Bronze	Total
1	England	2	1	4	7
2	Sweden	2	0	0	2
3	Denmark	1	3	3	7
4	West Germany	0	1	3	4
Totals (4 entries)		5	5	10	20
