= Jordan R. Stewart =

Louisiana reconstruction era American politician

Louisiana House of Representatives
- In office 1872–1876

Louisiana State Senate
- In office 1880–1888

Personal details
- Born: c. 1845 Louisiana
- Party: Republican

Jordan R. Stewart (born c. 1845) was a state legislator who served in the Louisiana House of Representatives and the Louisiana State Senate during the Reconstruction era.

== Biography ==
Stewart was born a slave in Louisiana in about 1845. He served in the American Civil War as a lieutenant in the 73rd US Colored Infantry

Stewart was elected to serve in the Louisiana House of Representatives representing Tensas Parish from 1872 until 1876.

In 1873 he was a deputy sheriff and a watchman of the customs house in New Orleans and in 1876 he was elected the sheriff for Terrebonne Parish.

In 1878 he fled Tensas Parish to avoid the violence of the Democratic campaign of forcefully taking power by killing and other violence against Republicans and African-Americans.

In March 1879 he was the Terrebonne Parish elected delegate to the constitutional convention. Later the same year he was selected as the Republican nomination for state senator in the ninth district along with Mayer Cahen who was nominated unopposed and with Stewart winning over Henry Frank 10 votes to 3½. Stewart and Cahen were elected over the two democrats and went on to serve in the Louisiana State Senate from 1880 until 1888 in two sessions for the 9th senatorial district. During the 1886 senatorial session he was a member of the Committee on Militia and the Committee on Rules.

Stewart had been a supporter of Taylor Beattie until September 1882 when he swapped allegiances to William Pitt Kellogg for the congressional post in the United States House of Representatives.

Whilst attending a political meeting in March 1886 on a plantation in Terrebonne Parish Stewart was shot in his side by a Bill Hawkins who was later jailed. The two had been in a dispute which turned angry and Stewart had struck Hawkins before being shot, the senators injury was described at the time as serious but not necessarily fatal.

He had several other roles such as a member of the police jury, a member of the parish school board and acting as an agent for the brokerage run by P. B. S. Pinchback and Caesar Antoine.

== See also ==
- African American officeholders from the end of the Civil War until before 1900
