= Elo Hansen =

Danish badminton player

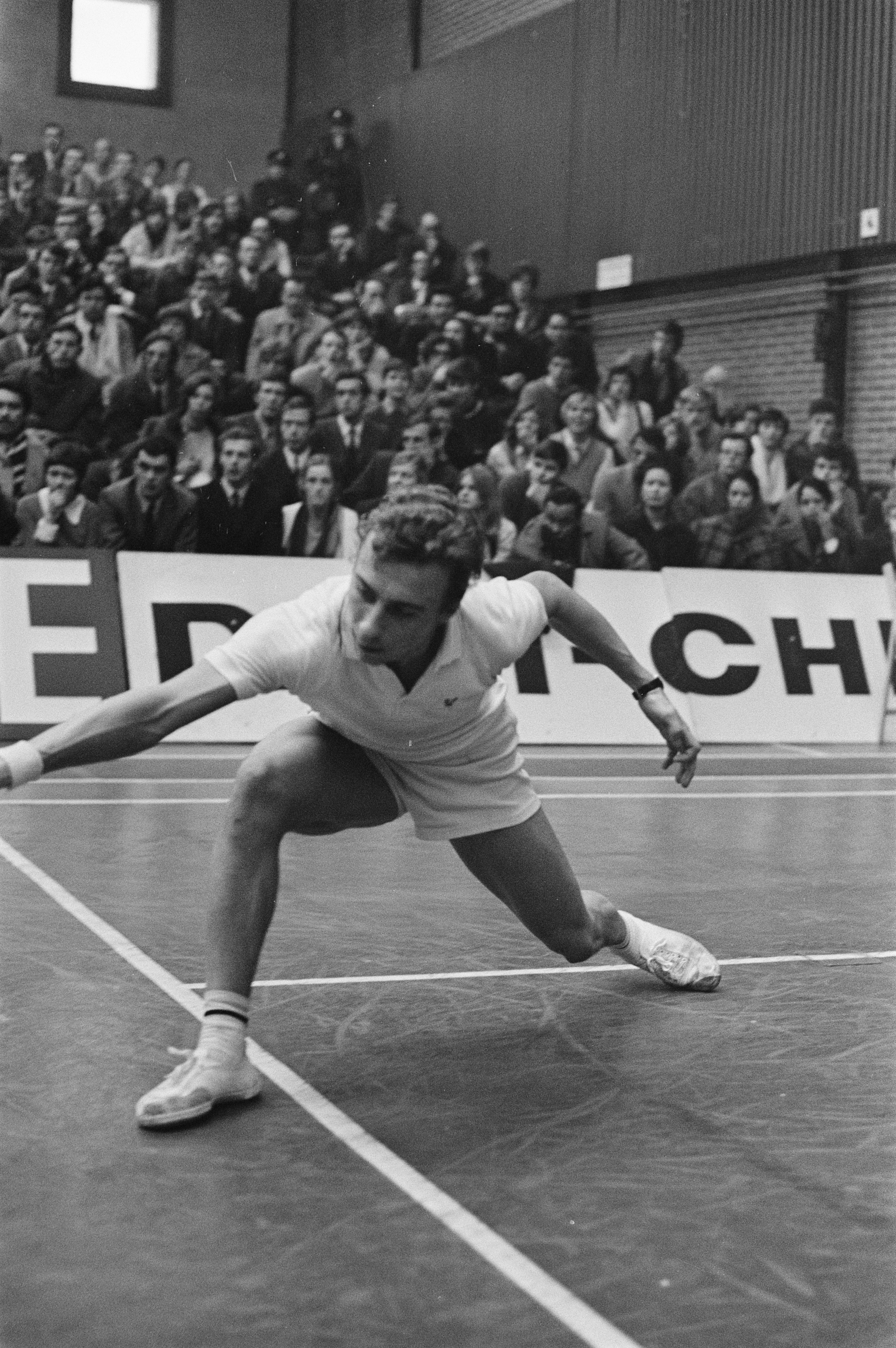
- Hansen in 1970

Sport
- Country: Denmark
- Sport: Badminton
- Handedness: Right
- Career title: 1970 European Men's doubles champion
Medal record
Men's badminton
Representing Denmark
Thomas Cup
Silver medal – second place	1973 Jakarta	Men's team
European Championships
Gold medal – first place	1970 Port Talbot	Men's doubles
Silver medal – second place	1970 Port Talbot	Men's singles
Silver medal – second place	1976 Dublin	Men's singles
Bronze medal – third place	1968 Bochum	Men's singles
Bronze medal – third place	1972 Karlskrona	Men's doubles
Bronze medal – third place	1974 Vienna	Men's doubles
European Mixed Team Championships
Gold medal – first place	1976 Dublin	Mixed team
Silver medal – second place	1972 Karlskrona	Mixed team
Silver medal – second place	1974 Vienna	Mixed team

Elo Hansen is a retired male badminton player from Denmark who won international titles in all three events (singles, doubles, and mixed doubles) from the late 1960s through the mid-1970s.

== Career ==
Hansen won the gold medal at the 1970 European Badminton Championships in men's doubles with Per Walsøe and the silver medal in singles in the same tournament. He was a singles silver medalist again at the European Championships in 1976. A highly impressive shotmaker, Hansen played in four consecutive Thomas Cup (men's international team) campaigns for Denmark, ('66–'67, '69–'70, '72–'73, '75–'76), but never overtook his contemporary, Svend Pri, as Denmark's leading player of that era. Hansen's international singles titles included the French Open (1969), the Dutch Open (1970), the Swedish Open (1971), the Norwegian International (1973), and the Portugal International (1974). His finest moment in badminton probably came in Denmark's narrow (4–5) 1970 Thomas Cup semi-final loss to defending champion Malaysia in Kuala Lumpur when he defeated both Tan Aik Huang and Punch Gunalan in straight games.

== Achievements ==
=== European Championships ===
Men's singles
Year	Venue	Opponent	Score	Result
1968	Ruhrlandhalle, Bochum, West Germany	(Sweden) Sture Johnsson	4–15, 15–11, 12–15	Bronze
1970	Afan Lido, Port Talbot, Wales	(Sweden) Sture Johnsson	5–15, 6–15	Silver
1976	Fitzwilliam Club, Dublin, Ireland	(Denmark) Flemming Delfs	4–15, 7–15	Silver

Men's doubles
Year	Venue	Partner	Opponent	Score	Result
1970	Afan Lido, Port Talbot, Wales	(Denmark) Per Walsøe	(Denmark) Henning Borch (Denmark) Erland Kops	15–9, 2–15, 15–10	Gold
1972	Karlskrona Idrottshall, Karlskrona, Sweden	(Denmark) Erland Kops	(West Germany) Willi Braun (West Germany) Roland Maywald	13–15, 8–15	Bronze
1974	Stadthalle, Vienna, Austria	(Denmark) Flemming Delfs	(West Germany) Willi Braun (West Germany) Roland Maywald	8–15, 6–15	Bronze

=== International tournaments (22 titles, 13 runners-up) ===
Men's singles
Year	Tournament	Opponent	Score	Result
1969	French Open	(Singapore) Lee Kin Tat	15–6, 15–14	(gold) Winner
1970	Dutch Open	(South Africa) Alan Parsons	15–5, 15–13	(gold) Winner
1971	Swedish Open	(Sweden) Sture Johnsson	17–18, 15–10, 15–5	(gold) Winner
1971	Dutch Open	(Denmark) Svend Pri	15–10, 11–15, 10–15	(silver) Runner-up
1973	Norwegian International	(Sweden) Thomas Kihlström	15–10, 15–8	(gold) Winner
1974	Portugal International	(Denmark) Flemming Delfs	15–5, 15–9	(gold) Winner

Men's doubles
Year	Tournament	Partner	Opponent	Score	Result
1966	Dutch Open	(Denmark) Knud Aage Nielsen	(Malaysia) Oon Chong Hau (Malaysia) Punch Gunalan	4–15, 4–15	(silver) Runner-up
1967	Norwegian International	(Denmark) Erland Kops	(Sweden) Sture Johnsson (Sweden) Kurt Johnsson	15–8, 15–11	(gold) Winner
1970	Swedish Open	(Denmark) Poul Petersen	(Denmark) Svend Pri (Denmark) Per Walsøe	5–15, 15–11, 1–15	(silver) Runner-up
1973	Nordic Championships	(Denmark) Flemming Delfs	(Denmark) Svend Pri (Denmark) Poul Petersen	16–18, 17–16, 15–10	(gold) Winner
1974	Portugal International	(Denmark) Flemming Delfs	(England) David Hunt (England) William Kidd	12–15, 15–8, 10–15	(silver) Runner-up
1974	Nordic Championships	(Denmark) Flemming Delfs	(Denmark) Svend Pri (Denmark) Poul Petersen	10–15, 6–15	(silver) Runner-up
1975	Jamaica International	(Denmark) Flemming Delfs	(England) Mike Tredgett (England) Ray Stevens	15–13, 4–15, 11–15	(silver) Runner-up
1975	Mexico International	(Denmark) Flemming Delfs	(Sweden) Sture Johnsson (Sweden) Thomas Kihlström	11–15, 15–13, 15–5	(gold) Winner
1975	Norwegian International	(Denmark) Flemming Delfs	(Sweden) Bengt Fröman (Sweden) Thomas Kihlström	5–15, 15–5, 18–17	(gold) Winner
1975	Nordic Championships	(Denmark) Flemming Delfs	(Sweden) Bengt Fröman (Sweden) Thomas Kihlström	9–15, 2–15	(silver) Runner-up
1976	Swedish Open	(Denmark) Flemming Delfs	(Denmark) Jesper Helledie (Denmark) Jørgen Mortensen	15–0, 15–2	(gold) Winner
1976	Norwegian International	(Denmark) Flemming Delfs	(Sweden) Bengt Fröman (Sweden) Thomas Kihlström	6–15, 12–15	(silver) Runner-up
1976	Dutch Open	(Denmark) Flemming Delfs	(Denmark) Klaus Kaagaard (Denmark) Steen Skovgaard	15–6, 15–12	(gold) Winner
1976	Denmark Open	(Denmark) Flemming Delfs	(England) David Eddy (England) Eddy Sutton	13–15, 11–15	(silver) Runner-up
1977	Dutch Open	(Denmark) Steen Skovgaard	(England) David Eddy (England) Eddy Sutton	15–6, 8–15, 15–17	(silver) Runner-up

Mixed doubles
Year	Tournament	Partner	Opponent	Score	Result
1967	Norwegian International	(Denmark) Ulla Strand	(Denmark) Erland Kops (Denmark) Lizbeth von Barnekow	15–9, 15–12	(gold) Winner
1968	Nordic Championships	(Denmark) Karin Jørgensen	(Denmark) Poul-Erik Nielsen (Denmark) Pernille Mølgaard Hansen	10–15, 15–7, 9–15	(silver) Runner-up
1969	French Open	(Denmark) Lene Horvid	(West Germany) Torsten Winter (England) Julie Rickard	15–9, 14–17, 15–7	(gold) Winner
1970	Swedish Open	(Denmark) Karin Jørgensen	(Denmark) Per Walsøe (Denmark) Pernille Kaagaard	15–3, 5–15, 8–15	(silver) Runner-up
1972	Nordic Championships	(Denmark) Ulla Strand	(Denmark) Per Walsøe (Denmark) Pernille Kaagaard	15–11, 15–11	(gold) Winner
1973	Denmark Open	(Denmark) Ulla Strand	(England) Derek Talbot (England) Nora Perry	4–15, 17–14, 15–10	(gold) Winner
1973	Nordic Championships	(Denmark) Ulla Strand	(Sweden) Gert Perneklo (Sweden) Eva Stuart	18–14, 15–9	(gold) Winner
1973	USSR International	(Denmark) Lene Køppen	(West Germany) Roland Maywald (Soviet Union) Tatjana Antropova	15–9, 6–15, 15–5	(gold) Winner
1974	Denmark Open	(Denmark) Ulla Strand	(West Germany) Wolfgang Bochow (West Germany) Marieluise Zizmann	15–5, 15–3	(gold) Winner
1974	Nordic Championships	(Denmark) Pernille Kaagaard	(Denmark) Poul Petersen (Denmark) Anne Flindt	15–12, 15–12	(gold) Winner
1975	Norwegian International	(Denmark) Inge Borgstrøm	(Denmark) Niels Bruun (Netherlands) Joke van Beusekom	15–4, 15–14	(gold) Winner
1975	Jamaica International	(Denmark) Lene Køppen	(Canada) Lucio Fabris (Canada) Barbara Welch	15–10, 13–18, 15–3	(gold) Winner
1976	Norwegian International	(Denmark) Pernille Kaagaard	(Denmark) Mogens Neergaard (Denmark) Lilli B. Petersen	15–1, 15–8	(gold) Winner
1976	Nordic Championships	(Denmark) Pernille Kaagaard	(Denmark) Steen Skovgaard (Denmark) Lene Køppen	0–15, 6–15	(silver) Runner-up
