= David Eddy (badminton) =

English badminton player

Personal information
- Nationality: British (English)
- Born: May 1944 (age 82) Staffordshire, England

Sport
- Sport: Badminton
Medal record
Men's badminton
Representing England
World Cup
Bronze medal – third place	1979 Tokyo	Men's doubles
Commonwealth Games
Bronze medal – third place	1970 Edinburgh	Mixed doubles
Gold medal – first place	1978 Edmonton	Mixed team
European Championships
Gold medal – first place	1968 Bochum	Men's doubles
Gold medal – first place	1970 Port Talbot	Mixed doubles
Gold medal – first place	1978 Preston	Mixed team
Bronze medal – third place	1970 Port Talbot	Men's doubles
Bronze medal – third place	1978 Preston	Men's doubles

John David Eddy (born May 1944) is a retired badminton player from England who won national and international titles from the late 1960s to the early 1980s.

== Biography ==
Eddy was born in Staffordshire and represented the England team at the 1970 British Commonwealth Games in Edinburgh, Scotland. He won a bronze medal in the mixed doubles event, partnering Sue Whetnall.

Eight years later he was part of the team that won the gold medal in the new team event, at the 1978 Commonwealth Games in Edmonton, Canada.

Though a highly competent singles player, the crisp hitting Eddy's greatest success came in doubles. He won the gold medal at the 1968 European Badminton Championships in men's doubles with Roger Powell. Two years later he also won the gold medal at the 1970 European Badminton Championships in mixed doubles partnered by Susan Whetnall with whom he shared the All-England mixed doubles title in 1974. Eddy and Powell were men's doubles runners-up at the All-Englands in both 1969 and 1970. Eddy and Eddy Sutton won men's doubles at the Danish Open in 1976, the only English team to do so since the 1930s. He compiled an impressive individual winning record on four successive English Thomas Cup (men's international) teams between 1969 and 1979.

He represented Staffordshire at county level.

== Achievements ==
=== World Cup ===
Men's doubles
Year	Venue	Partner	Opponent	Score	Result
1979	Tokyo, Japan	(England) Derek Talbot	(Indonesia) Ade Chandra (Indonesia) Christian Hadinata	5–15, 8–15	Bronze

=== European Championships ===
Men's doubles
Year	Venue	Partner	Opponent	Score	Result
1968	Ruhrlandhalle, Bochum, West Germany	(England) Roger Powell	(England) Tony Jordan (England) Roger Mills	7–15, 15–13, 15–5	Gold
1970	Afan Lido, Port Talbot, Wales	(England) Roger Powell	(Denmark) Erland Kops (Denmark) Henning Borch	8–15, 5–15	Bronze
1978	Guild Hall, Preston, England	(England) Eddy Sutton	(Sweden) Bengt Fröman (Sweden) Thomas Kihlström	9–15, 5–15	Bronze

Mixed doubles
Year	Venue	Partner	Opponent	Score	Result
1970	Afan Lido, Port Talbot, Wales	(England) Susan Whetnall	(England) Derek Talbot (England) Gillian Perrin	17–16, 17–16	Gold

=== International tournaments (25 titles, 17 runners-up) ===
Men's singles
Year	Tournament	Opponent	Score	Result
1976	Welsh International	(Netherlands) Rob Ridder	15–11, 14–17, 15–8	(gold) Winner
1977	Welsh International	(England) Mike Tredgett	9–15, 4–15	(silver) Runner-up
1980	Portugal International	(England) Gerry Asquith	15–6, 9–15, 15–5	(gold) Winner
1981	Malta International	(West Germany) Joachim Reiche	15–9, 15–4	(gold) Winner
1983	Malta International	(Netherlands) Clemens Wortel	14–17, 15–8, 15–6	(gold) Winner

Men's doubles
Year	Tournament	Partner	Opponent	Score	Result
1968	Scottish Open	(England) Roger Powell	(England) David Horton (England) Tony Jordan	11–15, 15–6, 15–5	(gold) Winner
1969	All England Open	(England) Roger Powell	(Denmark) Henning Borch (Denmark) Erland Kops	15–13, 10–15, 9–15	(silver) Runner-up
1969	Irish Open	(England) Roger Powell	(England) Roger Mills (England) Tony Jordan	15–8, 15–8	(silver) Runner-up
1970	Scottish Open	(England) Derek Talbot	(England) David Horton (England) Elliot Stuart	18–13, 5–15, 9–15	(silver) Runner-up
1970	All England Open	(England) Roger Powell	(Denmark) Tom Bacher (Denmark) Poul Petersen	11–15, 0–15	(silver) Runner-up
1970	Dutch Open	(England) Roger Powell	(West Germany) Roland Maywald (West Germany) Gerhard Kucki	15–8, 15–10	(gold) Winner
1973	Dutch Open	(England) Eddy Sutton	(England) Derek Talbot (England) Elliot Stuart	15–12, 18–15	(gold) Winner
1975	Dutch Open	(England) Eddy Sutton	(England) Ray Stevens (England) Mike Tredgett	12–15, 9–15	(silver) Runner-up
1975	German Open	(England) Eddy Sutton	(Sweden) Bengt Fröman (Sweden) Thomas Kihlström	13–15, 5–15	(silver) Runner-up
1976	Denmark Open	(England) Eddy Sutton	(Denmark) Flemming Delfs (Denmark) Elo Hansen	15–13, 15–11	(gold) Winner
1976	Welsh International	(England) Eddy Sutton	(England) Alan Connor (England) William Kidd	15–7, 13–18, 15–7	(gold) Winner
1977	Dutch Open	(England) Eddy Sutton	(Denmark) Elo Hansen (Denmark) Steen Skovgaard	6–15, 15–8, 17–15	(gold) Winner
1977	Welsh International	(England) Eddy Sutton	(England) Elliot Stuart (England) Mike Tredgett	9–13 retired	(gold) Winner
1978	Welsh International	(England) Eddy Sutton	(England) Ray Stevens (England) Mike Tredgett	8–15, 3–15	(silver) Runner-up
1979	Denmark Open	(England) Eddy Sutton	(Japan) Yoshitaka Iino (Japan) Masao Tsuchida	9–15, 7–15	(silver) Runner-up
1979	Bell's Open	(England) Ray Stevens	(Scotland) Billy Gilliland (Scotland) Dan Travers	15–12, 15–5	(gold) Winner
1980	Portugal International	(England) Elliot Stuart	(England) Gerry Asquith (England) Ray Rofe	15–6, 15–18, 15–11	(gold) Winner
1981	Welsh International	(England) Eddy Sutton	(England) Tim Stokes (Wales) Mark Richards	15–11, 15–6	(gold) Winner
1982	Bell's Open	(England) Eddy Sutton	(Denmark) Claus Thomsen (Denmark) Nils Skeby	18–15, 10–15, 15–8	(gold) Winner
1983	Malta International	(England) Chris Baxter	(Netherlands) Martin Kooymans (Netherlands) Clemens Wortel	6–15, 15–6, 17–14	(gold) Winner
1984	Portugal International	(England) Chris Baxter	(England) Gerry Asquith (England) Elliot Stuart	15–17, 12–15	(silver) Runner-up
1986	Portugal International	(England) Elliot Stuart	(Scotland) Kenny Middlemiss (Scotland) Kevin Scott	13–15, 15–12, 15–10	(gold) Winner
1987	Portugal International	(England) Elliot Stuart	(England) N. Clinton (England) Nick Pettman	15–4, 15–4	(gold) Winner

Mixed doubles
Year	Tournament	Partner	Opponent	Score	Result
1968	Dutch Open	(England) Margaret Boxall	(England) Paul Whetnall (England) Angela Bairstow	13–15, 11–15	(silver) Runner-up
1970	Dutch Open	(England) Margaret Boxall	(England) Derek Talbot (England) Gillian Gilks	14–18, 8–15	(silver) Runner-up
1972	Swedish Open	(England) Gillian Gilks	(Denmark) Svend Pri (Denmark) Ulla Strand	15–10, 15–8	(gold) Winner
1974	All England Open	(England) Susan Whetnall	(England) Derek Talbot (England) Gillian Gilks	15–6, 15–6	(gold) Winner
1975	Dutch Open	(England) Susan Whetnall	(West Germany) Wolfgang Bochow (West Germany) Marieluise Zizmann	15–8, 15–3	(gold) Winner
1976	U.S. Open	(England) Susan Whetnall	(Sweden) Thomas Kihlström (United States) Pam Brady	15–6, 10–15, 15–12	(gold) Winner
1976	Denmark Open	(England) Barbara Sutton	(Denmark) Steen Skovgaard (Denmark) Lene Køppen	8–15, 4–15	(silver) Runner-up
1976	Welsh International	(England) Barbara Sutton	(Netherlands) Rob Ridder (England) Pauline Davies	15–9, 12–15, 15–9	(gold) Winner
1977	Canadian Open	(England) Nora Perry	(Denmark) Steen Skovgaard (England) Jane Webster	15–4, 15–12	(gold) Winner
1977	Denmark Open	(England) Barbara Sutton	(Denmark) Steen Skovgaard (Denmark) Lene Køppen	12–15, 8–15	(silver) Runner-up
1977	German Open	(England) Barbara Sutton	(Netherlands) Rob Ridder (Netherlands) Marjan Ridder	15–11, 12–15, 15–10	(gold) Winner
1979	Dutch Open	(England) Barbara Sutton	(England) Derek Talbot (England) Gillian Gilks	8–15, 11–15	(silver) Runner-up
1979	Welsh International	(England) Barbara Sutton	(Scotland) Billy Gilliland (England) Karen Chapman	7–15, 10–15	(silver) Runner-up
1984	Portugal International	(Sweden) Eva Stuart	(England) Gerry Asquith (England) Fiona Elliott	12–15, 15–9, 3–15	(silver) Runner-up
