= 2005 Dutch Open (badminton) =

The 2005 Dutch Open in badminton was held in Den Bosch, Netherlands, from October 12, 2005 to October 16, 2005.

== Results ==
Category	Winners	Runners-up	Score
Men's singles	(Malaysia) Muhammad Hafiz Hashim	(Japan) Shoji Sato	15–4, 15–12
Women's singles	(Germany) Xu Huaiwen	(Netherlands) Yao Jie	11–7, 11–2
Men's doubles	(Malaysia) Choong Tan Fook & Lee Wan Wah	(Japan) Tadashi Ohtsuka & Keita Masuda	15–7, 15–4
Women's doubles	(Netherlands) Mia Audina & Lotte Bruil	(Malaysia) Wong Pei Tty & Chin Eei Hui	15–9, 15–10
Mixed doubles	(Poland) Robert Mateusiak & Nadieżda Kostiuczyk	(Germany) Ingo Kindervater & Kathrin Piotrowski	15–5, 15–5
