= Sture Johnsson =

Swedish badminton player (born 1945)

Sture Göran Johnsson
Personal information
- Born: 27 September 1945 (age 81) Mölndal, Västra Götaland County, Sweden

Sport
- Country: Sweden
- Sport: Badminton
- Handedness: Right
- Career titles: European champion (1968, 1970 & 1974)
Medal record
Men's badminton
Representing Sweden
European Championships
Gold medal – first place	1968 Bochum	Men's singles
Gold medal – first place	1970 Port Talbot	Men's singles
Gold medal – first place	1974 Vienna	Men's singles
Bronze medal – third place	1978 Preston	Men's singles
European Mixed Team Championships
Bronze medal – third place	1974 Vienna	Mixed team
Bronze medal – third place	1978 Preston	Mixed team

Sture Johnsson (born 27 September 1945) is a retired badminton player from Sweden who won numerous Swedish national and international men's singles titles. His game was characterized by impressive stamina and mobility, and a powerful overhead smash.

== Career ==
Johnsson won men's singles at the first European Badminton Championships in 1968. He eventually won three singles titles at this biennial event (1968, 1970 and 1974), a total bested only by Peter Gade in the early 2000s. He won the World Invitational Championships in 1971 held in Glasgow and reached the semifinals of men's singles at the All-England Championships on four occasions and was one of only a very few players to beat Rudy Hartono in tournament play during Hartono's prime (semifinals of 1973 German Open). Johnsson was a member of six consecutive Swedish Thomas Cup teams between 1963 and 1979.

He also competed at the first ever IBF World Championships in Malmö, in 1977, and was defeated in quarterfinals by the eventual champion Flemming Delfs.

=== 1972 Summer Olympics ===
Johnsson competed in badminton at the 1972 Summer Olympics, as a demonstration sport competition. In men's singles, he lost in semifinals against Rudy Hartono, 15–2, 15–4. In mixed doubles he played with Eva Twedberg, and they were beaten in the first round by Roland Maywald and Brigitte Steden of West Germany.

== Achievements ==
=== European Championships ===
Men's singles
Year	Venue	Opponent	Score	Result
1968	Ruhrlandhalle, Bochum, West Germany	(West Germany) Wolfgang Bochow	17–14, 11–15, 15–5	Gold
1970	Afan Lido, Port Talbot, Wales	(Denmark) Elo Hansen	15–5, 15–6	Gold
1974	Stadthalle, Vienna, Austria	(Sweden) Thomas Kihlström	15–7, 15–8	Gold
1978	Guild Hall, Preston, England	(Denmark) Flemming Delfs	14–17, 9–15	Bronze

=== International tournaments (25 titles, 28 runners-up) ===
Men's singles
Year	Tournament	Opponent	Score	Result
1965	Norwegian International	(Sweden) Kurt Johnsson	15–11, 15–10	(gold) Winner
1967	Norwegian International	(Denmark) Erland Kops	8–15, 6–15	(silver) Runner-up
1967	Nordic Championships	(Denmark) Erland Kops	7–15, 12–15	(silver) Runner-up
1968	French Open	(Singapore) Lee Kin Tat	15–12, 15–3	(gold) Winner
1968	Norwegian International	(Denmark) Klaus Kaagaard	17–16, 15–5	(gold) Winner
1969	Swedish Open	(Denmark) Svend Pri	18–15, 12–15, 10–15	(silver) Runner-up
1969	Canada Open	(Denmark) Erland Kops	11–15, 1–15	(silver) Runner-up
1969	Norwegian International	(Denmark) Klaus Kaagaard	13–18, 15–2, 12–15	(silver) Runner-up
1969	Nordic Championships	(Sweden) Kurt Johnsson	15–6, 15–8	(gold) Winner
1970	Swedish Open	(Denmark) Svend Pri	15–0, 3–15, 5–15	(silver) Runner-up
1971	German Open	(Denmark) Jørgen Mortensen	18–15, 15–5	(gold) Winner
1971	Swedish Open	(Denmark) Elo Hansen	18–17, 10–15, 5–15	(silver) Runner-up
1971	Nordic Championships	(Denmark) Svend Pri	15–8, 11–15, 7–15	(silver) Runner-up
1972	German Open	(Malaysia) Tan Aik Huang	14–18, 15–5, 15–7	(gold) Winner
1972	Dutch Open	(Denmark) Svend Pri	15–8, 15–2	(gold) Winner
1972	Swedish Open	(Denmark) Svend Pri	12–15, 6–15	(silver) Runner-up
1972	U.S. Open	(England) Derek Talbot	15–3, 13–15, 15–8	(gold) Winner
1972	Canada Open	(England) Derek Talbot	7–15, 6–15	(silver) Runner-up
1972	Mexico International	(Mexico) Roy Díaz González	15–8, 15–11	(gold) Winner
1972	Nordic Championships	(Sweden) Thomas Kihlström	15–3, 17–14	(gold) Winner
1973	German Open	(Indonesia) Tjun Tjun	15–5, 12–15, 15–5	(gold) Winner
1973	Dutch Open	(West Germany) Wolfgang Bochow	15–6, 8–15, 15–6	(gold) Winner
1973	Swedish Open	(Denmark) Svend Pri	15–5, 6–15, 10–15	(silver) Runner-up
1973	U.S. Open	(England) Derek Talbot	15–4, 15–4	(gold) Winner
1973	Mexico International	(Mexico) Roy Díaz González	15–4, 15–4	(gold) Winner
1973	Jamaica International	(West Germany) Wolfgang Bochow	15–9, 15–12	(gold) Winner
1973	Nordic Championships	(Denmark) Svend Pri	6–15, 8–15	(silver) Runner-up
1974	German Open	(West Germany) Wolfgang Bochow	11–15, 18–15, 15–12	(gold) Winner
1974	Dutch Open	(Denmark) Svend Pri	7–15, 7–15	(silver) Runner-up
1974	Denmark Open	(Denmark) Svend Pri	11–15, 5–15	(silver) Runner-up
1974	Swedish Open	(Denmark) Klaus Kaagaard	15–3, 15–11	(gold) Winner
1974	Jamaica International	(Mexico) Roy Díaz González	15–2, 15–7	(gold) Winner
1975	Dutch Open	(Denmark) Flemming Delfs	15–14, 0–15, 11–15	(silver) Runner-up
1975	Swedish Open	(Denmark) Svend Pri	17–15, 8–15, 9–15	(silver) Runner-up
1975	Mexico International	(Sweden) Thomas Kihlström	15–6, 11–15, 11–15	(silver) Runner-up
1975	Norwegian International	(Denmark) Flemming Delfs	1–15, 5–15	(silver) Runner-up
1975	Nordic Championships	(Denmark) Flemming Delfs	15–6, 12–15, 15–3	(gold) Winner
1976	Swedish Open	(England) Ray Stevens	15–12, 15–10	(gold) Winner
1976	Norwegian International	(Denmark) Flemming Delfs	15–4, 1–15, 15–7	(gold) Winner
1977	German Open	(England) Derek Talbot	12–15, 18–15, 15–7	(gold) Winner
1977	Dutch Open	(England) Derek Talbot	15–8, 6–15, 13–18	(silver) Runner-up
1978	Norwegian International	(Denmark) Steen Fladberg	15–10, 5–6 retired	(silver) Runner-up

Men's doubles
Year	Tournament	Partner	Opponent	Score	Result
1967	Norwegian International	(Sweden) Kurt Johnsson	(Denmark) Erland Kops (Denmark) Elo Hansen	8–15, 11–15	(silver) Runner-up
1968	French Open	(Sweden) Kurt Johnsson	(West Germany) Horst Lösche (West Germany) Gerhard Kucki	15–6, 3–15, 2–15	(silver) Runner-up
1968	Norwegian International	(Sweden) Kurt Johnsson	(Denmark) Tom Bacher (Denmark) Klaus Kaagaard	9–15, 7–15	(silver) Runner-up
1969	Norwegian International	(Sweden) Gert Perneklo	(Denmark) Jørgen Mortensen (Denmark) Klaus Kaagaard	8–15, 4–15	(silver) Runner-up
1971	Norwegian International	(Sweden) Bengt Fröman	(Sweden) Kurt Johnsson (Sweden) Thomas Kihlström	12–15, 9–15	(silver) Runner-up
1975	Mexico International	(Sweden) Thomas Kihlström	(Denmark) Flemming Delfs (Denmark) Elo Hansen	15–11, 13–15, 5–15	(silver) Runner-up
1976	Mexico International	(Sweden) Stefan Karlsson	(England) Ray Stevens (England) Mike Tredgett	6–15, 5–15	(silver) Runner-up

Mixed doubles
Year	Tournament	Partner	Opponent	Score	Result
1969	Norwegian International	(Sweden) Eva Twedberg	(Sweden) Kurt Johnsson (Sweden) Karin Lindquist	15–7, 15–7	(gold) Winner
1973	U.S. Open	(Sweden) Eva Twedberg	(United States) Thomas Carmichael (United States) Pam Brady	18–13, 15–12	(gold) Winner
1973	Jamaica International	(Sweden) Eva Twedberg	(England) Mike Tredgett (England) Margaret Beck	15–3, 18–15	(gold) Winner
1975	Mexico International	(Peru) Ofelia de Telge	(Sweden) Thomas Kihlström (United States) Judianne Kelly	9–15, 8–15	(silver) Runner-up

== Summary ==
Rank	Event	Date	Venue
Open Championships
1	Men's singles	1974, 1976	Swedish Open
1	Men's singles	1965, 1968, 1976	Norwegian International
1	Mixed doubles	1969	Norwegian International
1	Men's singles	1968	French Open
1	Men's singles	1973, 1974	Jamaica International
1	Mixed doubles	1973	Jamaica International
1	Men's singles	1972, 1973	U.S. Open
1	Mixed doubles	1973	U.S. Open
1	Men's singles	1972, 1973	Mexico International
1	Men's singles	1971, 1972, 1973, 1974, 1977	German Open
1	Men's singles	1972, 1973	Dutch Open
1	Men's singles	1969, 1972, 1975	Nordic Championships
National Championships
1	Men's singles	1965, 1966, 1967, 1968, 1970, 1971, 1972, 1973, 1974, 1975, 1977, 1979	Swedish Nationals
1	Men's doubles	1970, 1972	Swedish Nationals
