= Willi Braun =

German badminton player

Personal information
- Born: 2 August 1944 (age 81)

Sport
- Country: Federal Republic of Germany
- Sport: Badminton
Medal record
Men's badminton
Representing West Germany
European Championships
| Gold medal – first place | 1972 Karlskrona | Men's doubles |
| Gold medal – first place | 1974 Vienna | Men's doubles |
| Bronze medal – third place | 1968 Bochum | Men's doubles |
| Bronze medal – third place | 1976 Dublin | Men's doubles |
European Mixed Team Championships
| Bronze medal – third place | 1972 Karlskrona | Mixed team |

Willi Braun (born 2 August 1944) is a retired male badminton player from Germany.

== Career ==
A doubles specialist noted for his ability to "cut off" the shuttle in the forecourt, Braun won the gold medal at the 1972 and 1974 European Badminton Championships in men's doubles with Roland Maywald. They also won a bronze medal in 1972 Munich Olympic Games when badminton was played as a demonstration sport and reached the semifinal of the All-England Championships on three occasions. He also won the U.S. Open men's doubles title in 1976 with Maywald. Braun won the German national men's doubles title five times, four times with Maywald and once with Franz Beinvogel.
