= Wolfgang Bochow =

German badminton player

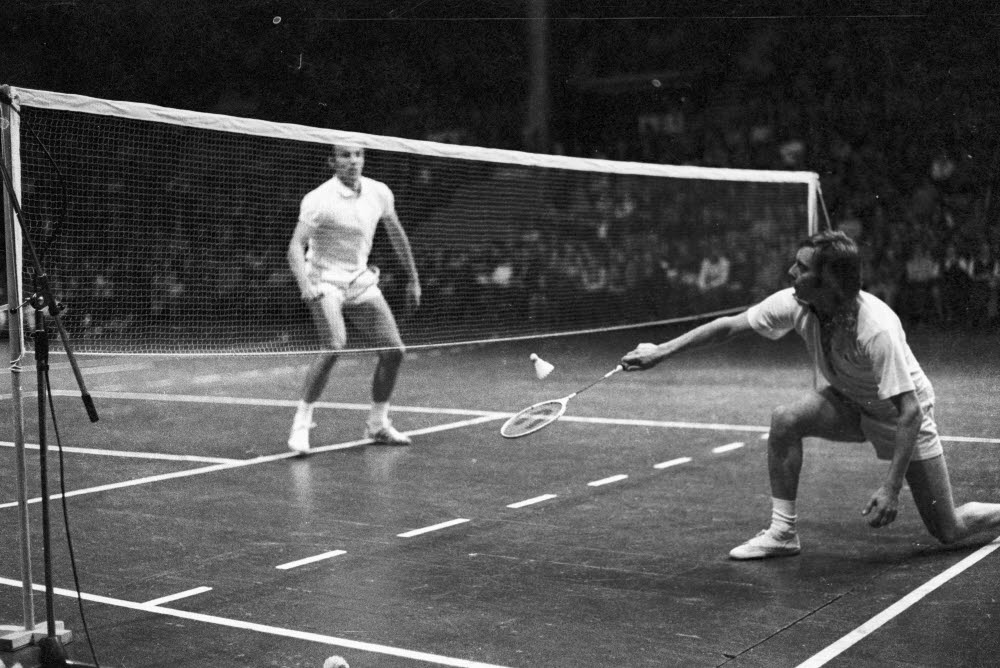

Personal information
- Born: 26 May 1944 Braunschweig, Niedersachsen, Nazi Germany
- Died: 14 September 2017 (aged 73)

Sport
- Country: Germany
- Sport: Badminton
- Event: Men's singles & doubles
Medal record
Men's badminton
Representing West Germany
European Championships
Gold medal – first place	1972 Karlskrona	Men's singles
Silver medal – second place	1968 Bochum	Men's singles
Silver medal – second place	1972 Karlskrona	Mixed doubles
Bronze medal – third place	1970 Port Talbot	Men's singles
Bronze medal – third place	1976 Dublin	Men's singles
Bronze medal – third place	1972 Karlskrona	Men's doubles
Bronze medal – third place	1968 Bochum	Mixed doubles
Bronze medal – third place	1970 Port Talbot	Mixed doubles
Bronze medal – third place	1974 Vienna	Mixed doubles
European Mixed Team Championships
Bronze medal – third place	1972 Karlskrona	Mixed team

Wolfgang Bochow (26 May 1944 – 14 September 2017) was a badminton player from West Germany who rated among the world's best in the late 1960s and early 1970s. Tall and powerful, he had one of the strongest backhands in the game.

== Career ==
Bochow won the gold medal at the 1972 European Badminton Championships in men's singles. Between 1968 and 1976 he won eight other medals at this biennial event; three bronzes and a silver in mixed doubles, a silver and two bronzes in singles, and a bronze in men's doubles. Bochow was a men's singles semi-finalist in the 1971 All-England Championships and an All-England mixed doubles finalist with Irmgard Latz (Gerlatzka) in 1970.

He was the bronze medalist at the 1972 Munich Olympic Games in the singles discipline when badminton was played as a demonstration sport. Bochow won 15 German National titles between 1963 and 1975, 8 in men's singles, 2 in men's doubles and 5 in mixed doubles.
