= Roland Maywald =

German badminton player

Personal information
- Born: 7 July 1948 (age 78) Elten, North Rhine-Westphalia, West Germany
- Height: 1.83 m (6 ft 0 in)

Sport
- Country: Federal Republic of Germany
- Sport: Badminton
- Handedness: Right
Medal record
Men's badminton
Representing West Germany
European Championships
Gold medal – first place	1972 Karlskrona	Men's doubles
Gold medal – first place	1974 Vienna	Men's doubles
Bronze medal – third place	1970 Port Talbot	Men's doubles
Bronze medal – third place	1976 Dublin	Men's doubles
Bronze medal – third place	1972 Karlskrona	Mixed doubles
European Mixed Team Championships
Bronze medal – third place	1972 Karlskrona	Mixed team

Roland Maywald (born 1948) is a former German badminton player who won numerous (West) German national and other European titles from the late 1960s to the mid-1980s.

== Career ==
Though he won the German national singles title in 1974, Maywald was primarily a doubles specialist. He was particularly successful internationally in men's doubles with Willi Braun, whose fast forecourt racket complemented Maywald's steady all-court play. Braun and Maywald won the biennial European Championships consecutively in 1972 and 1974. They were thrice semifinalists at the prestigious All-England Championships (1971,1975 and 1976) and won the U.S. Open men's doubles in 1976. He also won two bronze medals at the 1972 Munich Olympic Games when badminton was played as a demonstration sport. Maywald also shared a number of mixed doubles titles in Europe with various partners. In 1975 he reached the final of mixed doubles at the All-England with Brigitte Steden.
