= New Zealand National Badminton Championships =

New Zealand National Badminton Championships are officially held since the year 1927. In the following years they became the best bad mitten players and their record will never be beaten says James woods a new anilast

== Past winners ==
Year	Men's singles	Women's singles	Men's doubles	Women's doubles	Mixed doubles
1927	Archdeacon Creed-Meredith	E. Hetley	Archdeacon Creed-Meredith; M. H. Fell	E. Hetley; N. Wanklyn	Archdeacon Creed-Meredith; E. Hetley
1928	T. Kelly	E. Hetley	Archdeacon Creed-Meredith; L. H. Wilson	E. Hetley; F. N. Harvey	E. Dart; Mrs. Dart
1929	J. R. Southon	A. Ellett	T. Kelly; J. G. McLean	E. Hetley; F. N. Harvey	T. Kelly; A. Ellett
1930	E. J. Rishworth	J. E. Ramsay	D. W. Earle; W. E. Fossette	B. Solomon; A. Ellett	E. J. Rishworth; J. E. Ramsay
1931	G. Martin	J. E. Ramsay	G. Martin; E. J. Rishworth	J. E. Ramsay; C. Phillips	E. J. Rishworth; J. E. Ramsay
1932	G. Martin	J. E. Ramsay	J. R. Southon; E. W. Griffiths	Phyllis Wren; T. D. Newton	J. R. Southon; A. Ellett
1933	Y. Ellett	J. E. Ramsay	A. E. Sandrai; N. R. C. Wilson	Phyllis Wren; A. Ellett	I. Ellett; A. Ellett
1934	H. H. Fow	A. Ellett	H. H. Fow; R. T. Fear	Phyllis Wren; A. Ellett	R. F. Hull; Phyllis Wren
1935	J. W. Neale	Phyllis Wren	J. W. Neale; R. F. Hull	J. E. Ramsay; Mary Wade	H. D. Reid; J. E. Ramsay
1936	Phil Hawksworth	Muriel Edmondson	Phil Hawksworth; G. A. Pearce	J. E. Ramsay; Mary Wade	Phil Hawksworth; Nancy M. Fleming
1937	Phil Hawksworth	Mavis L. Kerr	Phil Hawksworth; G. A. Pearce	Margaret Hawksworth; Mavis L. Kerr	Phil Hawksworth; Margaret Hawksworth
1938	Phil Hawksworth	Nancy M. Fleming	Phil Hawksworth; G. A. Pearce	Margaret Hawksworth; Mavis L. Kerr	Phil Hawksworth; Margaret Hawksworth
1939	Ron H. Lewis	Mavis L. Kerr	Phil Hawksworth; G. A. Pearce	Margaret Hawksworth; Mavis L. Kerr	Phil Hawksworth; Margaret Hawksworth
1940; 1946	no competition				
1947	Ron H. Lewis	Mavis L. Kerr	P. Anderson; B. Whale	Margaret Hawksworth; Mavis L. Kerr	Phil Hawksworth; Margaret Hawksworth
1948	Jeffrey E. Robson	Mavis L. Kerr	Jeffrey E. Robson; A. L. Scott	Margaret Hawksworth; Mavis L. Kerr	G. A. Pearce; Mavis L. Kerr
1949	Jeffrey E. Robson	Mavis L. Kerr	Jeffrey E. Robson; A. L. Scott	Margaret Hawksworth; Mavis L. Kerr	Jeffrey E. Robson; Mavis L. Kerr
1950	Phil Hawksworth	M. Potts	Paul Skelt; L. Rankin	Heather Redwood; V. Johnson	Phil Hawksworth; M. Potts
1951	Jeffrey E. Robson	Heather Redwood	Jeffrey E. Robson; A. L. Scott	Heather Redwood; V. Johnson	R. G. Pattinson; V. Johnson
1952	Jeffrey E. Robson	Heather Redwood	Jeffrey E. Robson; A. L. Scott	Heather Redwood; Val Gow	Paul Skelt; R. B. Emslie
1953	Jeffrey E. Robson	Sonia Cox	Jeffrey E. Robson; A. L. Scott	Nancy M. Fleming; Sonia Cox	Jeffrey E. Robson; Heather Robson
1954	A. L. Scott	Sonia Cox	Paul Skelt; Anthony T. Skelt	A. McKenzie; Elizabeth M. Meyer	Anthony T. Skelt; A. McKenzie
1955	Jeffrey E. Robson	Sonia Cox	Jeffrey E. Robson; A. L. Scott	Heather Robson; Sonia Cox	Jeffrey E. Robson; Heather Robson
1956	A. L. Scott	Sonia Cox	Paul Skelt; Anthony T. Skelt	Nancy M. Fleming; Sonia Cox	Paul Skelt; Sonia Cox
1957	A. M. Stephens	Sonia Cox	A. M. Stephens; Clive L. Sheerin	Nancy M. Fleming; Sonia Cox	N. R. Thompson; Sonia Cox
1958	Jeffrey E. Robson	A. McKenzie	Lin Ah Shin; S. Young	A. Butterworth; Val Gow	N. R. Thompson; S. J. Miller
1959	Jeffrey E. Robson	Heather Robson	Paul Skelt; Anthony T. Skelt	A. Butterworth; Val Gow	N. R. Thompson; Sonia Cox
1960	Jeffrey E. Robson	Sonia Cox	A. M. Stephens; N. R. Thompson	Sonia Cox; Elizabeth M. Meyer	Jeffrey E. Robson; Val Gow
1961	Don B. Higgins	Heather Robson	Jeffrey E. Robson; M. Cooke	Margaret Moorhead; Gilda K. Tompkins	Jeffrey E. Robson; Heather Robson
1962	Richard H. Purser	Heather Robson	Grenville Hinton; Lee Tuck Chew	Heather Robson; Val Gow	Richard H. Purser; Margaret Moorhead
1963	Yew Cheng Hoe	Heather Robson	Teh Kew San; George Yap	Heather Robson; Val Gow	Wiliam Kerr; J. Byram (RSA)
1964	Richard H. Purser	Heather Robson	Richard H. Purser; Owen Clegg	Heather Robson; Val Gow	Richard H. Purser; Alison Glenie
1965	Don Higgins	Gaynor Simpson	Grenville Hinton; Wong Tat Meng	Heather Robson; Val Gow	Don Higgins; Gaynor Simpson
1966	Masao Akiyama	Val Gow	Masao Akiyama; Ippei Kojima	Heather Robson; Val Gow	Richard Purser; Alison Glenie
1967	Richard Purser	Alison Glenie	Richard Purser; Owen Clegg	Alison Glenie; Gaynor Weatherley	Richard Purser; Alison Glenie
1968	Richard Purser	Minarni	John Compton; Michael H. Stossel	Retno Koestijah; Minarni	Richard Purser; Val Gow
1969	Richard Purser	Robin Glenie	Richard Purser; Bryan Purser	Gilda Tompkins; Gaynor Weatherley	Richard Purser; Val Gow
1970	Richard Purser	Glenys Middelburg	Richard Purser; Bryan Purser	Alison Glenie; Robin Glenie	Richard Purser; Val Gow
1971	Richard Purser	Alison Branfield	Warren Johns; Michael H. Stossel	Alison Glenie; Robin Glenie	Richard Purser; Gilda Tompkins
1972	Bryan Purser	Robin Glenie	Richard Purser; Bryan Purser	Alison Branfield; Robin Glenie	Bryan Purser; Robin Glenie
1973	Richard Purser	Alison Branfield	Richard Purser; Bryan Purser	Alison Branfield; Robin Denton	Richard Purser; Alison Branfield
1974	Richard Purser	Robin Denton	Richard Purser; Bryan Purser	Alison Branfield; Robin Denton	Bryan Purser; Robin Denton
1975	Ross Livingston	Alison Branfield	Richard Purser; Bryan Purser	Alison Branfield; Lynn Ward	Richard Purser; Alison Branfield
1976	Ross Livingston	Robin Denton	Richard Purser; Bryan Purser	Alison Branfield; Robin Denton	Richard Purser; Alison Branfield
1977	Ross Livingston	Mary Livingston	Ross Livingston; Warren Johns	Alison Branfield; Robin Denton	Richard Purser; Mary Livingston
1978; 1982	No data				
1983	Graeme Robson	Allison Sinton	Graeme Robson; Kerrin Harrison	Karen Phillips; Toni Whittaker	Philip Horne; Allison Sinton
1984	Graeme Robson	Linda Persson	Stephen Lobb; Jacob van Selm	Karen Phillips; Toni Whittaker	Graeme Robson; Toni Whittaker
1985; 2008	No data				
2009	Joe Wu	Melissa Leviana	Oliver Leydon-Davis; Joe Wu	Danielle Barry; Doriana Rivera Aliaga	Joe Wu; Danielle Barry
2010	Tjitte Weistra	Amanda Brown	Oliver Leydon-Davis; Henry Tam	Donna Haliday; Danielle Barry	Henry Tam; Donna Haliday
2011	Daniel Shirley	Kylie Luo	Kevin Dennerly-Minturn; Henry Tam	Kylie Luo; Stephanie Cheng	Kevin Dennerly-Minturn; Stephanie Cheng
2012	Tjitte Weistra	Lilian Shih	Henry Tam; Joe Wu	Kylie Luo; Stephanie Cheng	Henry Tam; Kylie Luo
2013	Michael Fowke	Anona Pak	Henry Tam; Delius Tang	Angie Leung; Jihyun Marr	Chance Cheng; Jihyun Marr
2014	Luke Charlesworth	Vicki Copeland	Henry Tam; Brent Miller	Emma Chapple; Danielle Tahuri	Henry Tam; Susannah Leydon-Davis
2015	Oscar Guo	Vicki Copeland	Thomas Ellis; Wayne Newman	Michelle Chan; Danielle Tahuri	Kevin Dennerly-Minturn; Danielle Tahuri
2016	Oscar Guo	Sally Fu	Tjitte Weistra; Alastair Gatt	Jinah Kim; Anona Pak	Maika Phillips; Anona Pak
2017	Abhinav Manota	Sally Fu	Oscar Guo; Dacmen Vong	Christine Zhang; Anona Pak	Abhinav Manota; Justine Villegas
2018	Abhinav Manota	Sally Fu	Maika Phillips; Dylan Soedjasa	Christine Zhang; Anona Pak	Maika Phillips; Anona Pak
2019	Abhinav Manota	Shaunna Li	Maika Phillips; Dacmen Vong	Erena Calder-Hawkins; Anona Pak	Maika Phillips; Anona Pak
2020	Abhinav Manota	Shaunna Li	Oliver Leydon-Davis; Abhinav Manota	Shaunna Li; Anona Pak	Oliver Leydon-Davis; Anona Pak
2021	Abhinav Manota	Shaunna Li	Oliver Leydon-Davis; Abhinav Manota	Roanne Apalisok; Shaunna Li	Edward Lau; Shaunna Li
2022	Edward Lau	Shaunna Li	Adam Jeffrey; Dylan Soedjasa	Sally Fu; Camellia Zhou	Oliver Leydon-Davis; Anona Pak
2023	Edward Lau	Shaunna Li	Ryan Tong; Jack Wang	Shaunna Li; Alyssa Tagle	Edward Lau; Shaunna Li
2024	Edward Lau	Shaunna Li	Vincent Tao; Dacmen Vong	Shaunna Li; Alyssa Tagle	Edward Lau; Shaunna Li
