= 1972 Uber Cup squads =

This article lists the squads for the 1972 Uber Cup participating teams. The age listed for each player is on 6 June 1972 which was the first day of the tournament.

== Teams ==
=== Canada ===
Seven players represented Canada in the 1972 Uber Cup.

Name	DoB/Age
Marjory Shedd	17 March 1926 (aged 46)
Mimi Nilsson	1935 (aged 36–37)
Barbara Welch	28 February 1948 (aged 24)
Nancy McKinley	1945 (aged 26–27)
Barb O'Brien	1943 (aged 28–29)
Jane Youngberg	25 December 1948 (aged 23)
Judy Rollick	17 August 1944 (aged 27)

=== Denmark ===
Six players represented Denmark in the 1972 Uber Cup.

Name	DoB/Age
Annie Bøg Jørgensen	30 January 1951 (aged 21)
Imre Nielsen	1945 (aged 26–27)
Pernille Kaagaard	1945 (aged 26–27)
Karin Jørgensen	1940 (aged 31–32)
Ulla Strand	21 March 1943 (aged 29)
Anne Flindt	1 February 1943 (aged 29)

=== Indonesia ===
Eight players represented Indonesia in the 1972 Uber Cup.

Name	DoB/Age
Utami Dewi	16 January 1951 (aged 21)
Taty Sumirah	9 February 1952 (aged 20)
Intan Nurtjahja	1947 (aged 24–25)
Regina Masli	1940 (aged 31–32)
Poppy Tumengkol	1945 (aged 26–27)
Retno Kustijah	19 June 1942 (aged 29)
Theodora	1948 (aged 23–24)
Hesty Lianawati	27 July 1945 (aged 26)

=== Japan ===
Six players represented Japan in the 1969 Uber Cup.

Name	DoB/Age
Noriko Nakayama	30 May 1943 (aged 29)
Hiroe Yuki	15 November 1948 (aged 23)
Kaoru Takasaka	1949 (aged 22–23)
Machiko Aizawa	1949 (aged 22–23)
Etsuko Takenaka	1950 (aged 21–22)
Kiyoko Shibayama	1952 (aged 19–20)

=== New Zealand ===
Five players represented New Zealand in the 1973 Uber Cup.

Name	DoB/Age
Heather Robson	6 May 1928 (aged 44)
Alison Branfield	1945 (aged 26–27)
Robin Denton	1950 (aged 21–22)
Glenys Waller	1948 (aged 23–24)
Frances Walters	1947 (aged 24–25)
