= 1972 Uber Cup knockout stage =

Badminton tournament

The knockout stage for the 1972 Uber Cup began on 7 June 1972 with the first round and ended on 11 June with the final tie.

== Qualified teams ==
The teams that won their zonal tie qualified for the final knockout stage.

Group	Winners
A	Japan
B	Indonesia
C	Canada
D	Denmark
E	New Zealand

== Bracket ==
First round
New Zealand
Bye
7 June 1972 – Tokyo
Canada	0
Indonesia	7
Japan
Bye
Bye
Denmark

Second round
9 June 1972 – Tokyo
New Zealand	0
Indonesia	7
8 June 1972 – Tokyo
Japan	7
Denmark	0

Challenge round
11 June 1972 – Tokyo
Indonesia	1
Japan	6

== First round ==
=== Indonesia vs Canada ===
Indonesia
7
Tokyo Metropolitan Gymnasium
6 June 1972

Canada
0

			1	2	3
1	(Indonesia) (Canada)	Utami Dewi; Nancy McKinley	11; 2	11; 0
2	(Indonesia) (Canada)	Taty Sumirah; Jane Youngberg	11; 7	11; 1
3	(Indonesia) (Canada)	Intan Nurtjahja; Judy Rollick	11; 8	11; 8
4	(Indonesia) (Canada)	Regina Masli / Intan Nurtjahja; Marjory Shedd / Barbara Welch	15; 5	12; 15	15; 2
5	(Indonesia) (Canada)	Retno Kustijah / Poppy Tumengkol; Mimi Nilsson / Judy Rollick	15; 18	14; 17	18; 13
6	(Indonesia) (Canada)	Retno Kustijah / Poppy Tumengkol; Marjory Shedd / Barbara Welch	15; 3	15; 9
7	(Indonesia) (Canada)	Regina Masli / Intan Nurtjahja; Mimi Nilsson / Judy Rollick	15; 8	15; 4

== Second round ==
=== Japan vs Denmark ===
Japan
7
Tokyo Metropolitan Gymnasium
7 June 1972

Denmark
0

			1	2	3
1	(Japan) (Denmark)	Noriko Nakayama; Annie Bøg Jørgensen	11; 4	11; 0
2	(Japan) (Denmark)	Hiroe Yuki; Imre Nielsen	5; 11	11; 0	11; 4
3	(Japan) (Denmark)	Kaoru Takasaka; Pernille Kaagaard	11; 3	11; 3
4	(Japan) (Denmark)	Noriko Nakayama / Hiroe Yuki; Karin Jørgensen / Ulla Strand	15; 2	15; 3
5	(Japan) (Denmark)	Machiko Aizawa / Etsuko Takenaka; Anne Flindt / Pernille Kaagaard	15; 10	11; 15	15; 5
6	(Japan) (Denmark)	Noriko Nakayama / Hiroe Yuki; Anne Flindt / Pernille Kaagaard	15; 6	15; 8
7	(Japan) (Denmark)	Machiko Aizawa / Etsuko Takenaka; Karin Jørgensen / Imre Nielsen	15; 1	15; 9

=== Indonesia vs New Zealand ===
Indonesia
7
Tokyo Metropolitan Gymnasium
8 June 1972

New Zealand
0

			1	2	3
1	(Indonesia) (New Zealand)	Intan Nurtjahja; Frances Walters	11; 2	11; 1
2	(Indonesia) (New Zealand)	Taty Sumirah; Robin Glenie	11; 3	11; 5
3	(Indonesia) (New Zealand)	Utami Dewi; Alison Branfield	11; 7	11; 5
4	(Indonesia) (New Zealand)	Regina Masli / Intan Nurtjahja; Glenys Waller / Frances Walters	15; 3	15; 5
5	(Indonesia) (New Zealand)	Retno Kustijah / Poppy Tumengkol; Alison Branfield / Robin Glenie	10; 15	15; 11	15; 10
6	(Indonesia) (New Zealand)	Regina Masli / Intan Nurtjahja; Alison Branfield / Robin Glenie	11; 15	18; 15	15; 9
7	(Indonesia) (New Zealand)	Retno Kustijah / Poppy Tumengkol; Glenys Waller / Frances Walters	15; 4	15; 8

== Challenge round ==
Japan won the Uber Cup title for the third consecutive time, after beating Indonesia in the final for the second consecutive time. Indonesia got its point from third singles player Intan Nurtjahja who won the first match of the tie. Japan's Noriko Nakayama, née Noriko Takagi, remained undefeated in Uber Cup singles.

=== Japan vs Indonesia ===
Japan
6
Tokyo Metropolitan Gymnasium
11 June 1972

Indonesia
1

			1	2	3
1	(Japan) (Indonesia)	Noriko Nakayama; Utami Dewi	11; 2	11; 0
2	(Japan) (Indonesia)	Hiroe Yuki; Taty Sumirah	11; 4	11; 3
3	(Japan) (Indonesia)	Kaoru Takasaka; Intan Nurtjahja	9; 11	11; 7	3; 11
4	(Japan) (Indonesia)	Machiko Aizawa / Etsuko Takenaka; Regina Masli / Intan Nurtjahja	15; 5	11; 15	15; 7
5	(Japan) (Indonesia)	Noriko Nakayama / Hiroe Yuki; Retno Kustijah / Poppy Tumenkol	15; 9	15; 11
6	(Japan) (Indonesia)	Noriko Nakayama / Hiroe Yuki; Regina Masli / Intan Nurtjahja	15; 8	15; 8
7	(Japan) (Indonesia)	Machiko Aizawa / Etsuko Takenaka; Retno Kustijah / Poppy Tumengkol	15; 8	15; 9
