= 1960 Uber Cup knockout stage =

Badminton tournament

The knockout stage for the 1960 Uber Cup began on 4 April 1960 with the semi-finals and ended on 9 April with the final tie.

== Qualified teams ==
The teams that won their zonal tie qualified for the final knockout stage.

Group	Winners
A	United States
B	India
C	Canada
D	Denmark
E	New Zealand

== Bracket ==
First round
United States
Bye
5 April 1960 – Boston
Canada	3
New Zealand	4
4 April 1960 – New Haven
India	1
Denmark	6

Second round
United States
Bye
7 April 1960 – Baltimore
New Zealand	0
Denmark	7

Challenge round
9 April 1960 – Philadelphia
United States	5
Denmark	2

== First round ==
=== Denmark vs India ===
Denmark
6
New Haven, United States
4 April 1960

India
1

			1	2	3
1	(Denmark) (India)	Tonny Holst-Christensen; Meena Shah	3; 11	12; 11	11; 6
2	(Denmark) (India)	Hanne Jensen; Prem Prashar	5; 11	12; 9	3; 11
3	(Denmark) (India)	Inge Hasselsteen; Sushila Kapadia	11; 8	11; 0
4	(Denmark) (India)	Birte Kristiansen / Aase Winther; Suman Athavale / Mumtaj Lotwalla	17; 16	15; 9
5	(Denmark) (India)	Hanne Jensen / Kirsten Thorndahl; Sushila Kapadia / Prem Prashar	15; 6	15; 1
6	(Denmark) (India)	Hanne Jensen / Kirsten Thorndahl; Suman Athavale / Mumtaj Lotwalla	12; 15	15; 8	15; 4
7	(Denmark) (India)	Birte Kristiansen / Aase Winther; Sushila Kapadia / Prem Prashar	15; 2	15; 6

=== New Zealand vs Canada ===
New Zealand
4
Boston, United States
5 April 1960

Canada
3

			1	2	3
1	(New Zealand) (Canada)	Sonia Cox; Marjory Shedd	11; 4	11; 3
2	(New Zealand) (Canada)	Heather Robson; Joy Campbell	9; 12	11; 7	12; 11
3	(New Zealand) (Canada)	Glenys Hopkinson; Jean Miller	11; 7	11; 7
4	(New Zealand) (Canada)	Sonia Cox / Elizabeth M. Meyer; Marjory Shedd / Dorothy Tinline	10; 15	13; 18
5	(New Zealand) (Canada)	Val Gow / Heather Robson; Jean Miller / Joan Hennessy	15; 12	13; 15	11; 15
6	(New Zealand) (Canada)	Val Gow / Heather Robson; Marjory Shedd / Dorothy Tinline	5; 15	10; 15
7	(New Zealand) (Canada)	Sonia Cox / Elizabeth M. Meyer; Jean Miller / Joan Hennessy	13; 15	18; 16	15; 7

== Second round ==
=== Denmark vs New Zealand ===
Denmark
7
Baltimore, United States
7 April 1960

New Zealand
0

			1	2	3
1	(Denmark) (New Zealand)	Tonny Holst-Christensen; Sonia Cox	11; 7	11; 4
2	(Denmark) (New Zealand)	Hanne Jensen; Heather Robson	5; 11	11; 8	11; 4
3	(Denmark) (New Zealand)	Inge Hasselsteen; Glenys Hopkinson	11; 9	7; 11	11; 9
4	(Denmark) (New Zealand)	Birte Kristiansen / Aase Winther; Sonia Cox / Elizabeth M. Meyer	15; 9	15; 3
5	(Denmark) (New Zealand)	Hanne Jensen / Kirsten Thorndahl; Val Gow / Heather Robson	15; 3	15; 5
6	(Denmark) (New Zealand)	Hanne Jensen / Kirsten Thorndahl; Sonia Cox / Elizabeth M. Meyer				w/o
7	(Denmark) (New Zealand)	Birte Kristiansen / Aase Winther; Val Gow / Heather Robson	15; 5	15; 7

== Challenge round ==
=== United States vs Denmark ===
United States
5
Philadelphia, United States
9 April 1960

Denmark
2

			1	2	3
1	(United States) (Denmark)	Judy Devlin; Tonny Holst-Christensen	12; 9	12; 9
2	(United States) (Denmark)	Margaret Varner; Hanne Jensen	11; 8	11; 6
3	(United States) (Denmark)	Dorothy O'Neil; Inge Hasselsteen	11; 8	8; 11	11; 7
4	(United States) (Denmark)	Margaret Varner / Dorothy O'Neil; Kirsten Thorndahl / Hanne Jensen	14; 17	5; 15
5	(United States) (Denmark)	Judy Devlin / Susan Devlin; Birte Kristiansen / Aase Winther	15; 5	15; 3
6	(United States) (Denmark)	Margaret Varner / Dorothy O'Neil; Birte Kristiansen / Aase Winther	8; 15	17; 16	14; 17
7	(United States) (Denmark)	Judy Devlin / Susan Devlin; Kirsten Thorndahl / Hanne Jensen	5; 15	15; 6	18; 16
