= 1972 Uber Cup qualification =

Tournament details
- Dates: 27 July 1971 – 11 March 1972
- Location: Asian zone: Jakarta American zone: Toronto; European zone: Copenhagen; Hørsholm; Paisley; Scunthorpe Australasian zone: Wellington

The qualifying process for the 1972 Uber Cup took place from 27 July 1971 to 11 March 1972 to decide the final teams which will play in the final tournament.

== Qualification process ==
The qualification process is divided into four regions, the Asian Zone, the American Zone, the European Zone and the Australasian Zone. Teams in their respective zone will compete in a knockout format. Three singles and four doubles will be played on the day of competition. The teams that win their respective zone will earn a place in the final tournament to be held in Tokyo.

The winners of the 1969 Uber Cup, Japan were exempted from the qualifying rounds and automatically qualified for the final tournament.

=== Qualified teams ===
Country	Qualified as	Qualified on	Final appearance
Japan	1969 Uber Cup winners	14 June 1969	3rd
Indonesia	Asian Zone winners	25 February 1972	4th
Denmark	European Zone winners	11 March 1972	3rd
Canada	American Zone winners	26 February 1972	4th
New Zealand	Australasian Zone winners	27 July 1971	4th

== Asian Zone ==
=== Bracket ===
First round
31 October 1971 – Hong Kong
Hong Kong
Indonesia	w/o
Malaysia
Bye
India
Bye
Thailand
Bye

Semi-finals
30 December 1971 – Jakarta
Indonesia	6
Malaysia	1
26 December 1971
India
Thailand	w/o

Final
25 February 1972 – Jakarta
Indonesia	w/o
Thailand

=== First round ===
Indonesia automatically qualified for the next round after Hong Kong retired from the competition.

=== Semi-finals ===
Indonesia
6
Jakarta, Indonesia
30 December 1971

Malaysia
1

			1	2	3
1	(Indonesia) (Malaysia)	Utami Dewi; Rosalind Singha Ang	11; 3	2; 11	10; 12
2	(Indonesia) (Malaysia)	Taty Sumirah; Sylvia Tan	11; 3	11; 4
3	(Indonesia) (Malaysia)	Intan Nurtjahja; Yap Hei Lin	11; 6	11; 1
4	(Indonesia) (Malaysia)	Regina Masli / Poppy Tumengkol; Rosalind Singha Ang / Teoh Siew Yong	15; 12	15; 4
5	(Indonesia) (Malaysia)	Retno Kustijah / Intan Nurtjahja; Teh Mei Ling / Yap Hei Lin	15; 13	15; 2
6	(Indonesia) (Malaysia)	Retno Kustijah / Intan Nurtjahja; Rosalind Singha Ang / Teoh Siew Yong	9; 15	15; 13	15; 6
7	(Indonesia) (Malaysia)	Regina Masli / Poppy Tumengkol; Teh Mei Ling / Yap Hei Lin	15; 6	15; 4

=== Final ===
The final of the Asian zone between Indonesia and Thailand which was scheduled to be held in Jakarta on 25 February 1972 was later cancelled after Thailand withdrew from the competition due to injuries sustained by players. Therefore, Indonesia qualified for the final tournament in Tokyo.

== American Zone ==
=== Bracket ===
Final
26 February 1972 – Toronto
Canada	6
United States	1

=== Final ===
United States
1
Toronto, Canada
26 February 1972

Canada
6

			1	2	3
1	(United States) (Canada)	Diane Hales; Judy Rollick	5; 11	6; 11
2	(United States) (Canada)	Pam Stockton; Nancy McKinley	7; 11	9; 12
3	(United States) (Canada)	Vicki Toutz; Jane Youngberg	1; 11	3; 11
4	(United States) (Canada)	Polly Bretzke / Pam Stockton; Mimi Nilsson / Judy Rollick	11; 15	15; 5	5; 15
5	(United States) (Canada)	Dorothy O'Neil / Rosine Lemon; Marjory Shedd / Barbara Welch	7; 15	15; 7	15; 11
6	(United States) (Canada)	Dorothy O'Neil / Rosine Lemon; Mimi Nilsson / Judy Rollick	15; 15	5; 18	11
7	(United States) (Canada)	Polly Bretzke / Pam Stockton; Marjory Shedd / Barbara Welch	9; 15	14; 18

== European Zone ==
=== Bracket ===
First round
Ireland
Bye
30 October 1971 – Hørsholm
Denmark	6
Sweden	1
Bye
Bye
West Germany
Bye
Scotland
Bye
Netherlands
Bye
Bye
Bye
Bye
England

Second round
18 December 1971 – Copenhagen
Ireland	0
Denmark	7
Bye
West Germany
2 December 1971 – Paisley
Scotland	1
Netherlands	6
Bye
England

Semi-finals
15 January 1972 – Copenhagen
Denmark	6
West Germany	1
1 February 1972 – Scunthorpe
Netherlands	1
England	6

Final
11 March 1972 – Copenhagen
Denmark	5
England	2

=== First round ===
Denmark
6
Hørsholm, Denmark
30 October 1971

Sweden
1

			1	2	3
1	(Denmark) (Sweden)	Lene Køppen; Eva Twedberg	11; 9	5; 11	5; 11
2	(Denmark) (Sweden)	Pernille Kaagaard; Ewa Carlander	11; 0	11; 1
3	(Denmark) (Sweden)	Anne Berglund; Karin Lindquist	11; 4	11; 4
4	(Denmark) (Sweden)	Karin Jørgensen / Ulla Strand; Kathryn Ekengren / Eva Twedberg	15; 5	15; 2
5	(Denmark) (Sweden)	Anne Flindt / Pernille Kaagaard; Ewa Carlander / Karin Lindquist	15; 3	15; 2
6	(Denmark) (Sweden)	Anne Flindt / Pernille Kaagaard; Kathryn Ekengren / Eva Twedberg	15; 1	15; 0
7	(Denmark) (Sweden)	Karin Jørgensen / Ulla Strand; Ewa Carlander / Karin Lindquist	15; 2	15; 8

=== Second round ===
Scotland
1
Paisley, Scotland
2 December 1971

Netherlands
6

			1	2	3
1	(Scotland) (Netherlands)	Joanne Flockhart; Joke van Beusekom	4; 11	1; 11
2	(Scotland) (Netherlands)	Helen Kelly; Marjan Luesken	10; 12	0; 11
3	(Scotland) (Netherlands)	Christine Stewart; Felice de Nooyer	6; 11	6; 11
4	(Scotland) (Netherlands)	Joanne Flockhart / Helen Kelly; Marjan Luesken / Joke van Beusekom	11; 15	12; 15
5	(Scotland) (Netherlands)	Margaret Gibson / Christine Stewart; Marja Ridder / Henny Wesdorp	15; 10	14; 17	15; 9
6	(Scotland) (Netherlands)	Margaret Gibson / Christine Stewart; Marjan Luesken / Joke van Beusekom	8; 15	9; 15
7	(Scotland) (Netherlands)	Joanne Flockhart / Helen Kelly; Marja Ridder / Henny Wesdorp	14; 17	15; 5	10; 15

Denmark
7
Copenhagen, Denmark
18 December 1971

Ireland
0

			1	2	3
1	(Denmark) (Republic of Ireland)	Lene Køppen; Mary Bryan	12; 10	11; 2
2	(Denmark) (Republic of Ireland)	Anne Berglund; Barbara Beckett	11; 5	11; 3
3	(Denmark) (Republic of Ireland)	Pernille Kaagaard; Yvonne Kelly	11; 1	11; 0
4	(Denmark) (Republic of Ireland)	Anne Flindt / Pernille Kaagaard; Barbara Beckett / Lena McAleese	15; 1	15; 0
5	(Denmark) (Republic of Ireland)	Karin Jørgensen / Ulla Strand; Mary Bryan / Yvonne Kelly	15; 3	15; 9
6	(Denmark) (Republic of Ireland)	Karin Jørgensen / Ulla Strand; Barbara Beckett / Lena McAleese	15; 1	15; 7
7	(Denmark) (Republic of Ireland)	Anne Flindt / Pernille Kaagaard; Mary Bryan / Yvonne Kelly	15; 3	18; 13

=== Semi-finals ===
Denmark
6
Copenhagen, Denmark
15 January 1972

West Germany
1

			1	2	3
1	(Denmark) (West Germany)	Lene Køppen; Gudrun Ziebold	11; 4	11; 0
2	(Denmark) (West Germany)	Anne Berglund; Marieluise Wackerow	11; 8	11; 2
3	(Denmark) (West Germany)	Pernille Kaagaard; Brigitte Steden	11; 6	12; 11
4	(Denmark) (West Germany)	Karin Jørgensen / Ulla Strand; Anke Betz / Brigitte Steden	15; 9	15; 4
5	(Denmark) (West Germany)	Anne Flindt / Pernille Kaagaard; Marieluise Wackerow / Gudrun Ziebold	15; 8	15; 4
6	(Denmark) (West Germany)	Anne Flindt / Pernille Kaagaard; Anke Betz / Brigitte Steden	16; 17	15; 8	15; 0
7	(Denmark) (West Germany)	Karin Jørgensen / Ulla Strand; Marieluise Wackerow / Gudrun Ziebold	8; 15	15; 5	11; 15

England
6
Scunthorpe, England
1 February 1972

Netherlands
1

			1	2	3
1	(England) (Netherlands)	Margaret Beck; Joke van Beusekom	11; 8	7; 11	11; 7
2	(England) (Netherlands)	Gillian Gilks; Marjan Luesken	11; 4	11; 8
3	(England) (Netherlands)	Judy Hashman; Agnes van der Meulen	4; 11	5; 11
4	(England) (Netherlands)	Gillian Gilks / Judy Hashman; Lily ter Metz / Agnes van der Meulen	15; 6	15; 3
5	(England) (Netherlands)	Margaret Beck / Jenny Horton; Marjan Luesken / Joke van Beusekom	15; 6	15; 11
6	(England) (Netherlands)	Gillian Gilks / Judy Hashman; Marjan Luesken / Joke van Beusekom	15; 3	15; 11
7	(England) (Netherlands)	Margaret Beck / Jenny Horton; Lily ter Metz / Agnes van der Meulen	15; 8	15; 8

=== Final ===
England
2
Copenhagen, Denmark
11 March 1972

Denmark
5

			1	2	3
1	(England) (Denmark)	Julie Rickard; Pernille Kaagaard	5; 11	4; 11
2	(England) (Denmark)	Margaret Beck; Lene Køppen	8; 11	11; 12
3	(England) (Denmark)	Gillian Gilks; Anne Berglund	11; 8	4; 11	11; 4
4	(England) (Denmark)	Margaret Beck / Jenny Horton; Karin Jørgensen / Ulla Strand	10; 15	6; 15
5	(England) (Denmark)	Gillian Gilks / Judy Hashman; Anne Flindt / Pernille Kaagaard	9; 15	14; 18
6	(England) (Denmark)	Margaret Beck / Jenny Horton; Anne Flindt / Pernille Kaagaard	8; 15	6; 15
7	(England) (Denmark)	Gillian Gilks / Judy Hashman; Karin Jørgensen / Ulla Strand	15; 9	15; 11

== Australasian Zone ==
=== Bracket ===
Final
27 July 1971 – Wellington
New Zealand	4
Australia	3

=== Final ===
New Zealand
4
Wellington, New Zealand
27 July 1971

Australia
3

			1	2	3
1	(New Zealand) (Australia)	Alison Branfield; Judy Nyirati	11; 12	10; 12
2	(New Zealand) (Australia)	Robin Glenie; Joan Kennington	11; 7	11; 4
3	(New Zealand) (Australia)	Frances Walters; Joan Harwood	7; 11	2; 11
4	(New Zealand) (Australia)	Alison Branfield / Robin Glenie; Judy Nyirati / Joan Smith	15; 5	15; 0
5	(New Zealand) (Australia)	Glenys Waller / Frances Walters; Joan Harwood / Joan Kennington	15; 7	18; 15
6	(New Zealand) (Australia)	Glenys Waller / Frances Walters; Judy Nyirati / Joan Smith	15; 1	14; 18	11; 15
7	(New Zealand) (Australia)	Alison Branfield / Robin Glenie; Joan Harwood / Joan Kennington	15; 1	17; 15
