= 1970 Thomas Cup squads =

This article lists the squads for the 1970 Thomas Cup participating teams. The age listed for each player is on 28 May 1970 which was the first day of the tournament.

== Teams ==
=== Canada ===
Six players represented Canada in the 1970 Thomas Cup.

Name	DoB/Age
Jamie Paulson	26 April 1948 (aged 22)
Wayne Macdonnell	28 June 1940 (aged 29)
Dave Charron	1945 (aged 24–25)
Bruce Rollick	11 April 1943 (aged 27)
Channarong Ratanaseangsuang	1939 (aged 29–30)
Yves Paré	25 May 1945 (aged 25)

=== Denmark ===
Six players represented Denmark in the 1970 Thomas Cup. Two players were selected as reserves.

Name	DoB/Age
Klaus Kaagaard	1945 (aged 24–25)
Elo Hansen	1945 (aged 24–25)
Henning Borch	9 March 1938 (aged 32)
Per Walsøe	8 June 1943 (aged 26)
Tom Bacher	16 November 1941 (aged 28)
Poul Petersen	1950 (aged 19–20)
Reserve
Jørgen Mortensen	30 April 1941 (aged 29)
Flemming Delfs	7 September 1951 (aged 18)

=== Indonesia ===
Nine players represented Indonesia in the 1970 Thomas Cup.

Name	DoB/Age
Rudy Hartono	18 August 1949 (aged 20)
Muljadi	11 September 1942 (aged 27)
Darmadi	1945 (aged 24–25)
Indratno	1945 (aged 24–25)
Mintarja	1945 (aged 24–25)
Indra Gunawan	23 September 1947 (aged 22)
Iie Sumirat	15 November 1950 (aged 19)
Djaliteng	1947 (aged 22–23)
Nara	1947 (aged 22–23)

=== Malaysia ===
Seven players represented Malaysia in the 1970 Thomas Cup.

Name	DoB/Age
Tan Aik Huang	14 February 1946 (aged 24)
Teh Kew San	26 January 1935 (aged 35)
Punch Gunalan	4 February 1944 (aged 26)
Ng Boon Bee	17 December 1937 (aged 32)
Abdul Rahman Mohamed	9 May 1946 (aged 24)
Ng Tat Wai	5 September 1947 (aged 22)
Tan Aik Mong	6 April 1950 (aged 20)

=== New Zealand ===
Six players represented New Zealand in the 1970 Thomas Cup.

Name	DoB/Age
Bryan Purser	18 October 1950 (aged 19)
Richard Purser	28 February 1942 (aged 28)
Warren Johns	1949 (aged 20–21)
Michael Stossel	1943 (aged 26–27)
John Compton	1943 (aged 26–27)
Don Higgins	29 March 1934 (aged 36)
