= 1975 Uber Cup knockout stage =

Badminton tournament

The knockout stage for the 1975 Uber Cup began on 31 May 1975 with the first round and ended on 6 June with the final tie.

== Qualified teams ==
The teams that won their zonal tie qualified for the final knockout stage.

Group	Winners
H	Indonesia (hosts)
A	Japan
B	Malaysia
C	Canada
D	England
E	Australia

== Bracket ==
First round
Japan
Bye
31 May 1975 – Jakarta
Canada	4
Australia	3
1 June 1975 – Jakarta
Malaysia	0
Indonesia	7
Bye
England

Second round
2 June 1975 – Jakarta
Japan	6
Canada	1
4 June 1975 – Jakarta
Indonesia	5
England	2

Challenge round
6 June 1975 – Jakarta
Japan	2
Indonesia	5

== First round ==
=== Canada vs Australia ===
Canada
4
Istora Senayan
31 May 1975

Australia
3

			1	2	3
1	(Canada) (Australia)	Alison Delf; Judy Nyirati	12; 10	5; 11	5; 11
2	(Canada) (Australia)	Jane Youngberg; Joan Jones	11; 8	7; 11	11; 8
3	(Canada) (Australia)	Lesley Harris; Kay Terry	0; 11	11; 7	4; 11
4	(Canada) (Australia)	Wendy Clarkson / Lorraine Thorne; Beverley Hite / Kay Terry	14; 17	15; 5	15; 7
5	(Canada) (Australia)	Barbara Welch / Jane Youngberg; Joan Jones / Judy Nyirati	15; 8	15; 4
6	(Canada) (Australia)	Wendy Clarkson / Lorraine Thorne; Joan Jones / Judy Nyirati	3; 15	9; 15
7	(Canada) (Australia)	Barbara Welch / Jane Youngberg; Beverley Hite / Kay Terry	15; 7	15; 7

=== Indonesia vs Malaysia ===
Indonesia
7
Istora Senayan
1 June 1975

Malaysia
0

			1	2	3
1	(Indonesia) (Malaysia)	Taty Sumirah; Sylvia Ng	12; 11	7; 11	11; 0
2	(Indonesia) (Malaysia)	Theresia Widiastuti; Ong Ah Hong	11; 5	11; 1
3	(Indonesia) (Malaysia)	Utami Dewi; Rosalind Singha Ang	12; 10	8; 11	11; 4
4	(Indonesia) (Malaysia)	Regina Masli / Minarni Soedaryanto; Sylvia Tan / Yap Hei Lin	15; 6	15; 5
5	(Indonesia) (Malaysia)	Theresia Widiastuti / Imelda Wiguna; Rosalind Singha Ang / Sylvia Ng	15; 9	15; 8
6	(Indonesia) (Malaysia)	Theresia Widiastuti / Imelda Wiguna; Sylvia Tan / Yap Hei Lin	15; 4	15; 6
7	(Indonesia) (Malaysia)	Regina Masli / Minarni Soedaryanto; Rosalind Singha Ang / Sylvia Ng	15; 7	15; 6

== Second round ==
=== Japan vs Canada ===
Japan
6
Istora Senayan
2 June 1975

Canada
1

			1	2	3
1	(Japan) (Canada)	Hiroe Yuki; Alison Delf	11; 0	11; 0
2	(Japan) (Canada)	Etsuko Takenaka; Jane Youngberg	8; 11	11; 3	7; 11
3	(Japan) (Canada)	Atsuko Tokuda; Lesley Harris	11; 7	12; 11
4	(Japan) (Canada)	Machiko Aizawa / Etsuko Takenaka; Barbara Welch / Jane Youngberg	15; 8	15; 6
5	(Japan) (Canada)	Mika Ikeda / Hiroe Yuki; Wendy Clarkson / Lorraine Thorne	18; 16	15; 6
6	(Japan) (Canada)	Mika Ikeda / Hiroe Yuki; Barbara Welch / Jane Youngberg	15; 10	15; 7
7	(Japan) (Canada)	Machiko Aizawa / Etsuko Takenaka; Wendy Clarkson / Lorraine Thorne	15; 12	15; 8

=== Indonesia vs England ===
Indonesia
5
Istora Senayan
4 June 1975

England
2

			1	2	3
1	(Indonesia) (England)	Taty Sumirah; Margaret Beck	7; 11	11; 7	11; 6
2	(Indonesia) (England)	Theresia Widiastuti; Gillian Gilks	5; 11	12; 9	8; 11
3	(Indonesia) (England)	Utami Dewi; Jane Webster	12; 6	8; 0	11
4	(Indonesia) (England)	Regina Masli / Minarni Soedaryanto; Margaret Beck / Gillian Gilks	16; 18	8; 15
5	(Indonesia) (England)	Theresia Widiastuti / Imelda Wiguna; Margaret Boxall / Susan Whetnall	11; 15	15; 6	15; 12
6	(Indonesia) (England)	Regina Masli / Minarni Soedaryanto; Margaret Boxall / Susan Whetnall	15; 2	15; 1
7	(Indonesia) (England)	Theresia Widiastuti / Imelda Wiguna; Margaret Beck / Gillian Gilks	15; 11	13; 18	15; 11

== Challenge round ==
Japan played in its fourth consecutive Uber Cup final, having won the tournament in 1966, 1969, and 1972. The Japanese women won two of the three singles, but dropped all four doubles to the Indonesian women who were playing before their home crowd. Indonesia thus won the Uber Cup for the first time. It was the final Uber Cup appearance of two great "veterans", Japan's Noriko Nakayama (née Takagi), who completed her fourth campaign undefeated in singles, and Indonesia's Minarni Soedaryanto who, after playing on Indonesian teams since 1959, finally achieved the ultimate prize.

=== Japan vs Indonesia ===
Japan
2
Istora Senayan
6 June 1975

Indonesia
5

			1	2	3
1	(Japan) (Indonesia)	Hiroe Yuki; Theresia Widiastuti	11; 7	11; 1
2	(Japan) (Indonesia)	Atsuko Tokuda; Taty Sumirah	5; 11	2; 11
3	(Japan) (Indonesia)	Noriko Nakayama; Utami Dewi	11; 5	11; 3
4	(Japan) (Indonesia)	Etsuko Takenaka / Machiko Aizawa; Regina Masli / Minarni Soedaryanto	6; 15	15; 6	9; 15
5	(Japan) (Indonesia)	Mika Ikeda / Hiroe Yuki; Theresia Widiastuti / Imelda Wiguna	4; 15	9; 15
6	(Japan) (Indonesia)	Mika Ikeda / Hiroe Yuki; Regina Masli / Minarni Soedaryanto	8; 15	11; 15
7	(Japan) (Indonesia)	Etsuko Takenaka / Machiko Aizawa; Theresia Widiastuti / Imelda Wiguna	14; 17	0; 15
