= 1960 Uber Cup qualification =

Tournament details
- Dates: 29 June 1959 – 25 February 1960
- Location: Asian zone: Jamshedpur; Singapore European zone: Copenhagen; Dublin; Edinburgh Australasian zone: Dunedin; Melbourne; Wellington

The qualifying process for the 1960 Uber Cup took place from 29 June 1959 to 25 February 1960 to decide the final teams which will play in the final tournament.

== Qualification process ==
The qualification process is divided into four regions, the Asian Zone, the American Zone, the European Zone and the Australasian Zone. Teams in their respective zone will compete in a knockout format. Three singles and four doubles will be played on the day of competition. The teams that win their respective zone will earn a place in the final tournament to be held in Philadelphia, United States.

The winners of the 1957 Uber Cup, the United States were exempted from the qualifying rounds and automatically qualified for the challenge round. Therefore, Canada automatically qualified for the final tournament since there was no other opponent in the American zone qualifiers.

=== Qualified teams ===
Country	Qualified as	Qualified on	Final appearance
United States	1957 Uber Cup winners	18 March 1957	2nd
India	Asian Zone winners	3 December 1959	2nd
Denmark	European Zone winners	25 February 1960	2nd
Canada	Sole representative of the American Zone	1 March 1959	1st
New Zealand	Australasian Zone winners	26 September 1959	2nd

== Asian Zone ==
=== Bracket ===
Semi-finals
5 September 1959 – Singapore
Malaya	7
Hong Kong	0
Bye
India

Final
3 December 1959 – Jamshedpur
Malaya	2
India	5

=== Semi-finals ===
Malaya
7
Singapore
5 September 1959

Hong Kong
0

			1	2	3
1	(Malaysia) (Hong Kong)	Tan Gaik Bee; Cynder Ho	11; 2	11; 1
2	(Malaysia) (Hong Kong)	Nancy Lim; Helen Kwong	11; 4	11; 0
3	(Malaysia) (Hong Kong)	Teoh Siew Yong; Tsui Yuen	11; 5	11; 3
4	(Malaysia) (Hong Kong)	Cecilia Samuel / Tan Gaik Bee; Cynder Ho / Chan Yuen Yue	15; 2	15; 7
5	(Malaysia) (Hong Kong)	Amy Heah / Lam Kit Lin; Helen Kwong / Tsui Yuen	15; 9	15; 4
6	(Malaysia) (Hong Kong)	Amy Heah / Lam Kit Lin; Cynder Ho / Chan Yuen Yue	17; 15	15; 9
7	(Malaysia) (Hong Kong)	Cecilia Samuel / Tan Gaik Bee; Helen Kwong / Tsui Yuen	15; 3	15; 0

=== Final ===
India
5
Jamshedpur, India
3 December 1959

Malaya
2

			1	2	3
1	(India) (Malaysia)	Sushila Kapadia; Tan Gaik Bee	7; 11	6; 11
2	(India) (Malaysia)	Prem Prashar; Jean Moey	11; 3	11; 1
3	(India) (Malaysia)	Meena Shah; Rosy Low	11; 2	11; 3
4	(India) (Malaysia)	Sushila Kapadia / Prem Prashar; Amy Heah / Tan Gaik Bee	17; 14	13; 15	15; 11
5	(India) (Malaysia)	Suman Athavale / Mumtaj Lotwalla; Cecilia Samuel / Lam Kit Lin	15; 12	15; 12
6	(India) (Malaysia)	Suman Athavale / Mumtaj Lotwalla; Amy Heah / Tan Gaik Bee	12; 15	9; 15
7	(India) (Malaysia)	Sushila Kapadia / Prem Prashar; Cecilia Samuel / Lam Kit Lin	15; 11	15; 9

== European Zone ==
=== Bracket ===
First round
4 December 1959 – Copenhagen
Denmark	7
England	0
Scotland
Bye
Sweden
Bye
Ireland
Bye

Semi-finals
11 January 1960 – Edinburgh
Denmark	5
Scotland	2
18 January 1960 – Dublin
Sweden	0
Ireland	7

Final
25 February 1960 – Copenhagen
Denmark	6
Ireland	1

=== First round ===
Denmark
7
Copenhagen, Denmark
4 December 1959

England
0

			1	2	3
1	(Denmark) (England)	Tonny Holst-Christensen; June Timperley	11; 5	11; 1
2	(Denmark) (England)	Inge Hasselsteen; Margaret J. Frost	11; 2	11; 1
3	(Denmark) (England)	Hanne Jensen; Sheila Ryder	11; 7	11; 1
4	(Denmark) (England)	Birte Kristiansen / Aase Winther; Audrey Marshall / Ursula Smith	15; 8	15; 5
5	(Denmark) (England)	Kirsten Granlund / Hanne Jensen; Brenda Holborn / June Timperley	15; 7	15; 10
6	(Denmark) (England)	Kirsten Granlund / Hanne Jensen; Audrey Marshall / Ursula Smith	10; 12	15; 5	15
7	(Denmark) (England)	Birte Kristiansen / Aase Winther; Brenda Holborn / June Timperley	15; 2	15; 9

=== Semi-finals ===
Denmark
5
Edinburgh, Scotland
11 January 1960

Scotland
2

			1	2	3
1	(Denmark) (Scotland)	Tonny Holst-Christensen; Wilma Tyre	2; 11	8; 11
2	(Denmark) (Scotland)	Inge Hasselsteen; Catherine Dunglison	11; 3	11; 8
3	(Denmark) (Scotland)	Hanne Jensen; G. Allen	11; 1	11; 5
4	(Denmark) (Scotland)	Birte Kristiansen / Aase Winther; Catherine Dunglison / Wilma Tyre	11; 15	15; 7	15; 12
5	(Denmark) (Scotland)	Kirsten Granlund / Hanne Jensen; M. Massie / Maggie McIntosh	18; 13	15; 10
6	(Denmark) (Scotland)	Kirsten Granlund / Hanne Jensen; Catherine Dunglison / Wilma Tyre	11; 15	15; 7	12; 15
7	(Denmark) (Scotland)	Birte Kristiansen / Aase Winther; M. Massie / Maggie McIntosh	15; 12	15; 4

Ireland
7
Dublin, Ireland
18 January 1960

Sweden
0

			1	2	3
1	(Republic of Ireland) (Sweden)	Mary O'Sullivan; Eva Pettersson	11; 0	8; 11	11; 6
2	(Republic of Ireland) (Sweden)	Yvonne Kelly; Berit Olsson	5; 11	11; 9	11; 8
3	(Republic of Ireland) (Sweden)	Lena Rea; Lisbeth Friberg	1; 11	11; 4	11; 2
4	(Republic of Ireland) (Sweden)	Yvonne Kelly / Mary O'Sullivan; Ingrid Dahlberg / Berit Olsson	15; 8	15; 12
5	(Republic of Ireland) (Sweden)	Lena Rea / Jean Sharkey; Lisbeth Friberg / Eva Pettersson	15; 2	15; 8
6	(Republic of Ireland) (Sweden)	Lena Rea / Jean Sharkey; Ingrid Dahlberg / Berit Olsson	15; 6	7; 15	15; 3
7	(Republic of Ireland) (Sweden)	Yvonne Kelly / Mary O'Sullivan; Lisbeth Friberg / Eva Pettersson	15; 1	15; 11

=== Final ===
Denmark
6
Copenhagen, Denmark
25 February 1960

Ireland
1

			1	2	3
1	(Denmark) (Republic of Ireland)	Tonny Holst-Christensen; Mary O'Sullivan	11; 8	11; 5
2	(Denmark) (Republic of Ireland)	Inge Hasselsteen; Yvonne Kelly	11; 8	11; 5
3	(Denmark) (Republic of Ireland)	Hanne Jensen; Lena Rea	11; 3	11; 4
4	(Denmark) (Republic of Ireland)	Hanne Jensen / Birte Kristiansen; Yvonne Kelly / Mary O'Sullivan	15; 5	15; 5
5	(Denmark) (Republic of Ireland)	Inge Birgit Hansen / Aase Winther; Lena Rea / Jean Sharkey	15; 1	15; 4
6	(Denmark) (Republic of Ireland)	Hanne Jensen / Birte Kristiansen; Lena Rea / Jean Sharkey	15; 8	15; 3
7	(Denmark) (Republic of Ireland)	Inge Birgit Hansen / Aase Winther; Yvonne Kelly / Mary O'Sullivan	11; 15	13; 18

== Australasian Zone ==
=== Bracket ===
Semi-finals
29 June 1959 – Melbourne
Australia	5
Indonesia	2
15 August 1959 – Dunedin
Thailand	3
New Zealand	4

Final
26 September 1959 – Wellington
Australia	1
New Zealand	6

=== Semi-finals ===
Australia
5
Melbourne, Australia
29–30 June 1959

Indonesia
2

			1	2	3
1	(Australia) (Indonesia)	Margaret Russell; Yap Happy	11; 1	11; 5
2	(Australia) (Indonesia)	June Bevan; Oei Lin Nio	9; 11	11; 6	7; 11
3	(Australia) (Indonesia)	Amy Pincott; Minarni	9; 12	6; 11
4	(Australia) (Indonesia)	June Bevan / Amy Pincott; Retno Koestijah / Minarni	18; 14	14; 17	15; 10
5	(Australia) (Indonesia)	Margaret Russell / Joy Twining; Corry Kawilarang / Oei Lin Nio	15; 9	15; 9
6	(Australia) (Indonesia)	Margaret Russell / Joy Twining; Retno Koestijah / Minarni	18; 16	15; 4
7	(Australia) (Indonesia)	June Bevan / Amy Pincott; Corry Kawilarang / Oei Lin Nio	18; 15	15; 10

New Zealand
4
Dunedin, New Zealand
15 August 1959

Thailand
3

			1	2	3
1	(New Zealand) (Thailand)	Sonia Cox; Pratuang Pattabongse	0; 11	2; 11
2	(New Zealand) (Thailand)	Heather Robson; Supratra Kunakorn	11; 4	11; 0
3	(New Zealand) (Thailand)	Glenys Hopkinson; Porntip Buntanon	11; 3	11; 7
4	(New Zealand) (Thailand)	Sonia Cox / Elizabeth M. Meyer; Sumol Chanklum / Supratra Kunakorn	15; 6	15; 6
5	(New Zealand) (Thailand)	Val Gow / Heather Robson; Pratuang Pattabongse / Pankae Phongarn	11; 15	6; 15
6	(New Zealand) (Thailand)	Val Gow / Heather Robson; Sumol Chanklum / Supratra Kunakorn	15; 4	15; 0
7	(New Zealand) (Thailand)	Sonia Cox / Elizabeth M. Meyer; Pratuang Pattabongse / Pankae Phongarn	3; 15	15; 5	7; 15

=== Final ===
New Zealand
6
Wellington, New Zealand
26 September 1959

Australia
1

			1	2	3
1	(New Zealand) (Australia)	Sonia Cox; Margaret Russell	11; 5	12; 10
2	(New Zealand) (Australia)	Heather Robson; Joy Twining	11; 12	8; 8		retired
3	(New Zealand) (Australia)	Glenys Hopkinson; June Bevan	11; 5	11; 7
4	(New Zealand) (Australia)	Sonia Cox / Elizabeth M. Meyer; Margaret Russell / Joy Twining	15; 5	15; 8
5	(New Zealand) (Australia)	Val Gow / Heather Robson; June Bevan / Amy Pincott	6; 15	9; 15
6	(New Zealand) (Australia)	Val Gow / Heather Robson; Margaret Russell / Joy Twining	15; 11	15; 5
7	(New Zealand) (Australia)	Sonia Cox / Elizabeth M. Meyer; June Bevan / Amy Pincott	15; 11	12; 15	15; 10
