= 1971 Asian Badminton Championships =

Badminton championships

Tournament information
- Location: Jakarta, Indonesia
- Date: 13–21 August
- Venue: Istora Senayan

The 1971 Asia Badminton Championships was the 4th tournament of the Badminton Asia Championships. It was held August 1971 in Jakarta, Indonesia.

== Medalists ==
Discipline	Gold	Silver	Bronze
Men's singles	(Malaysia) Tan Aik Mong	(Japan) Junji Honma	(Thailand) Bandid Jaiyen
Women's singles	(Indonesia) Utami Dewi	(South Korea) Yoon Im-soon	(Indonesia) Tati Sumirah
Men's doubles	(Indonesia) Indra Gunawan (Indonesia) Nara Sudjana	(Indonesia) Tjun Tjun (Indonesia) Tata Budiman	(Indonesia) Ade Chandra (Indonesia) Christian Hadinata
Women's doubles	(Indonesia) Retno Koestijah (Indonesia) Intan Nurtjahja	(Indonesia) Poppy Tumengkol (Indonesia) Regina Masli	(South Korea) Yoon Im-soon (South Korea) Kim Jong-ja
Mixed doubles	(Indonesia) Christian Hadinata (Indonesia) Retno Koestijah	(Indonesia) Indra Gunawan (Indonesia) Intan Nurtjahja	(Indonesia) Tata Budiman (Indonesia) Poppy Tumengkol
Men's team	Indonesia; Christian Hadinata; Ade Chandra; Rudy Hartono; Muljadi	Malaysia; Tan Aik Mong; Tan Aik Huang; Ng Tat Wai; Abdul Rahman Mohamed	(Japan) Japan; Junji Honma; Ippei Kojima; Shoichi Toganoo

== Medal table ==
Rank	Nation	Gold	Silver	Bronze	Total
1	Indonesia	5	3	3	11
2	Malaysia	1	1	0	2
3	Japan	0	1	1	2
3	South Korea	0	1	1	2
5	Thailand	0	0	1	1
Totals (5 entries)		6	6	6	18

== Men's singles ==
=== Finals ===
Semi-finals
(Japan) Junji Honma	15	15
(Thailand) Bandid Jaiyen	8	10
(Myanmar) San Myint	7	12
(Malaysia) Tan Aik Mong	15	15

Final
(Japan) Junji Honma	5	10
(Malaysia) Tan Aik Mong	15	15
Third place
(Thailand) Bandid Jaiyen	17	15
(Myanmar) San Myint	14	7

=== Top half ===
==== Section 1 ====
First round

Second round
(Indonesia) R Hartono	15	15
(Hong Kong) Ko Y	7	2
(South Korea) Han S-k	15	15
(Philippines) V Oreta	6	1
(Singapore) Wee K	15	15
(Nepal) M Sahi	5	2
(Japan) J Honma	15	15
(India) A Parpia	5	5

Third round
(Indonesia) R Hartono
(South Korea) Han S-k	w	/	o
(Singapore) Wee K	5	3
(Japan) J Honma	15	15

Quarter-finals
(South Korea) Han S-k	6	4
(Japan) J Honma	15	15

==== Section 2 ====
First round
(Thailand) B Jaiyen	15	15
(South Korea) Lee O-h	2	1
(Nepal) G Singh	5	3
(Pakistan) K Salahuddin	15	15
(Philippines) D So	15	2	15
(Laos) C Outhabong	2	15	10
(Hong Kong) Tsoi F	15	11	15
(Dominion of Ceylon) L R Ariyananda	3	15	11
(Laos) B Minh	9	1
(Pakistan) H Shaheed	15	15
(Japan) S Toganoo	15	18
(India) D Ghosh	7	14
(Dominion of Ceylon) K D Nallathamby	3	3
(Indonesia) Darmawan	15	15
(Cambodia) Heng Sip	6	4
(Malaysia) Tan A H	15	15

Second round
(Thailand) B Jaiyen	15	15
(Pakistan) K Salahuddin	6	1
(Philippines) D So	17	15
(Hong Kong) Tsoi F	14	10
(Pakistan) H Shaheed	16	8
(Japan) S Toganoo	18	15
(Indonesia) Darmawan	18	15
(Malaysia) Tan A H	16	3

Third round
(Thailand) B Jaiyen	w	/	o
(Philippines) D So
(Japan) S Toganoo	3	18	10
(Indonesia) Darmawan	15	13	15

Quarter-finals
(Thailand) B Jaiyen	15	15
(Indonesia) Darmawan	2	12

=== Bottom half ===
==== Section 3 ====
First round
(Myanmar) S Myint	11	15	15
(Hong Kong) Soon B H	15	3	2
(Singapore) Yeoh A S	12	15	15
(Thailand) S Akyapisut	15	12	6
(South Korea) Kim B-s	9	9
(Indonesia) I Sumirat	15	15
(Cambodia) S Slayman	15	15
(Nepal) K C Balaram	1	4
(Malaysia) Abdul Rahman M	w	/	o
Q	(Myanmar) K Sein Shaung
(Laos) V Kham	8	5
(India) R Ghosh	15	15
(Cambodia) Heng Sin	15	15
(Philippines) R Navarro	14	12
(Pakistan) J Iqbal	15	10
(Japan) I Kojima	18	15

Second round
(Myanmar) S Myint	15	15
(Singapore) Yeoh A S	4	5
(Indonesia) I Sumirat	15	15
(Cambodia) S Slayman	7	3
(Malaysia) Abdul Rahman M	15	17
(India) R Ghosh	11	16
(Cambodia) Heng Sin	8	8
(Japan) I Kojima	15	15

Third round
(Myanmar) S Myint	3	15	15
(Indonesia) I Sumirat	15	11	9
(Malaysia) Abdul Rahman M	12	15	15
(Japan) I Kojima	15	11	12

Quarter-finals
(Myanmar) S Myint	13	15	15
(Malaysia) Abdul Rahman M	18	10	4

==== Section 4 ====
First round

Second round
(Indonesia) Muljadi
(India) S Goel	w	/	o
(South Korea) Kim E-g	15	15
(Philippines) J Gapas	2	3
(Cambodia) Sek S	15	15
(Nepal) K B Singha	2	5
(Hong Kong) Cheng K C	6	3
(Malaysia) Tan A M	15	15

Third round
(India) S Goel	15	15
(South Korea) Kim E-g	7	2
(Cambodia) Sek S	6	7
(Malaysia) Tan A M	15	15

Quarter-finals
(India) S Goel	9	13
(Malaysia) Tan A M	15	15

=== Qualification ===
Qualification round
	Score		Set 1	Set 2	Set 3
(Myanmar) Kyaw Sein Shaung	w.o.	(Indonesia) Darma Setiawan	Walkover		

== Women's singles ==
=== Finals ===
First round
(South Korea) Kim Jong-ja	11	11
(Hong Kong) Diana Leung	1	2
(South Korea) Oh Yeon-han	11	11
(Hong Kong) Diana Mui	1	0
(Malaysia) Rosalind Singha Ang	4	9
(Indonesia) Taty Sumirah	11	11
(South Korea) Yoon Im-soon	1	11	11
(Hong Kong) Pang Yuet Mui	11	7	4
(Indonesia) Eliza	11	11
(Cambodia) Thi Do My Lanh	8	2
(South Korea) Ok Bok-eun	10	2
(Indonesia) Theresia Widiastuti	12	11

Quarter-finals
(Indonesia) Utami Dewi	11	11
(South Korea) Kim Jong-ja	5	8
(South Korea) Oh Yeon-han	4	4
(Indonesia) Taty Sumirah	11	11
(South Korea) Yoon Im-soon	12	11
(Indonesia) Eliza	9	4
(Indonesia) Theresia Widiastuti	6	11
(Malaysia) Sylvia Ng	11	12

Semi-finals
(Indonesia) Utami Dewi	11	7	11
(Indonesia) Taty Sumirah	7	11	8
(South Korea) Yoon Im-soon	11	11
(Malaysia) Sylvia Ng	4	7

Final
(Indonesia) Utami Dewi	11	11
(South Korea) Yoon Im-soon	5	5
Third place
(Indonesia) Taty Sumirah	11	11
(Malaysia) Sylvia Ng	8	5

== Men's doubles ==
=== Finals ===
Semi-finals
(Indonesia) Ade Chandra (Indonesia) Christian Hadinata	1	15	15
(Indonesia) Indra Gunawan (Indonesia) Nara Sudjana	15	10	17
(India) Dipu Ghosh (India) Raman Ghosh	17	5	11
(Indonesia) Tata Budiman (Indonesia) Tjun Tjun	15	15	15

Final
(Indonesia) Indra Gunawan (Indonesia) Nara Sudjana	15	12	15
(Indonesia) Tata Budiman (Indonesia) Tjun Tjun	8	15	11
Third place
(Indonesia) Ade Chandra (Indonesia) Christian Hadinata	15	15
(India) Dipu Ghosh (India) Raman Ghosh	3	6

=== Top half ===
==== Section 1 ====
First round
(Hong Kong) Cheng K C (Hong Kong) Wong F H	15	15
(Nepal) K C Balaram (Nepal) K B Singha	5	8
(Singapore) Wee K (Singapore) Yeoh A S	15	15
(Philippines) J Gapas (Philippines) V Oreta	4	4

Second round
(Malaysia) Tan A H (Malaysia) Tan A M	6	12
(Indonesia) A Chandra (Indonesia) C Hadinata	15	15
(Hong Kong) Cheng K C (Hong Kong) Wong F H	18	15
(Singapore) Wee K (Singapore) Yeoh A S	17	11

Quarter-finals
(Indonesia) A Chandra (Indonesia) C Hadinata	15	15
(Hong Kong) Cheng K C (Hong Kong) Wong F H	4	5

==== Section 2 ====
First round
(Indonesia) I Gunawan (Indonesia) N Sudjana	15	15
(Nepal) P Pandey (Nepal) S Singha	1	1
(South Korea) Kim B-s (South Korea) Lee O-h	15	15
(Dominion of Ceylon) L R Ariyananda (Dominion of Ceylon) A R T de Silva	4	9
(India) S Goel (India) A Parpia	15	11	4
(Thailand) C Chumkum (Thailand) C Champakao	12	15	15
(Cambodia) Heng Sip (Cambodia) Sek S	15	10	15
(Hong Kong) Tsoi F (Hong Kong) Wong C L	3	15	10

Second round
(Indonesia) I Gunawan (Indonesia) N Sudjana	15	15
(South Korea) Kim B-s (South Korea) Lee O-h	2	3
(Thailand) C Chumkum (Thailand) C Champakao	15	15
(Cambodia) Heng Sip (Cambodia) Sek S	4	12

Quarter-finals
(Indonesia) I Gunawan (Indonesia) N Sudjana	15	15
(Thailand) C Chumkum (Thailand) C Champakao	12	11

=== Bottom half ===
==== Section 3 ====
First round
(Indonesia) Atik (Indonesia) I Sumirat	15	15
(Malaysia) Abdul Rahman M (Malaysia) Ng T W	11	13
(India) D Ghosh (India) R Ghosh	15	15
(Nepal) M Sahi (Nepal) G Singh	0	5
(Thailand) B Jaiyen (Thailand) T Phongful	5	15	15
(Pakistan) J Iqbal (Pakistan) H Shaheed	15	10	13
(Cambodia) Heng Sin (Cambodia) S Slayman	12	15	15
(Philippines) D So (Philippines) A Yanga	15	11	9

Second round
(Indonesia) Atik (Indonesia) I Sumirat	14	15	5
(India) D Ghosh (India) R Ghosh	18	6	15
(Thailand) B Jaiyen (Thailand) T Phongful	15	15
(Cambodia) Heng Sin (Cambodia) S Slayman	9	3

Quarter-finals
(India) D Ghosh (India) R Ghosh	15	15
(Thailand) B Jaiyen (Thailand) T Phongful	2	9

==== Section 4 ====
First round
(Indonesia) T Budiman (Indonesia) Tjun Tjun	15	15
(Hong Kong) Ko Y (Hong Kong) Soon B H	4	3
(Laos) B Minh (Laos) C Outhabong	w	/	o
(Myanmar) S Myint (Myanmar) T Naing

Second round
(Indonesia) T Budiman (Indonesia) Tjun Tjun	15	15
(Laos) B Minh (Laos) C Outhabong	7	4
(South Korea) Han S-k (South Korea) Kim E-g	4	9
(Japan) I Kojima (Japan) S Toganoo	15	15

Quarter-finals
(Indonesia) T Budiman (Indonesia) Tjun Tjun	15	15
(Japan) I Kojima (Japan) S Toganoo	12	7

== Women's doubles ==
=== Finals ===
Quarter-finals
(Indonesia) Retno Kustijah (Indonesia) Intan Nurtjahja	15	15
(South Korea) Oh Yeon-han (South Korea) Ok Bok-eun	0	1
(Hong Kong) Diana Leung (Hong Kong) Pang Yuet Mui	15	15
(Hong Kong) Diana Mui (Indonesia) Taty Sumirah	6	9
(Indonesia) Megawati (Indonesia) Wan Ing	13	15	7
(South Korea) Kim Jong-ja (South Korea) Yoon Im-soon	15	10	15
(Malaysia) Rosalind Singha Ang (Malaysia) Sylvia Ng	8	5
(Indonesia) Regina Masli (Indonesia) Poppy Tumengkol	15	15

Semi-finals
(Indonesia) Retno Kustijah (Indonesia) Intan Nurtjahja	15	15
(Hong Kong) Diana Leung (Hong Kong) Pang Yuet Mui	1	4
(South Korea) Kim Jong-ja (South Korea) Yoon Im-soon	1	15	6
(Indonesia) Regina Masli (Indonesia) Poppy Tumengkol	15	4	15

Final
(Indonesia) Retno Kustijah (Indonesia) Intan Nurtjahja	15	15
(Indonesia) Regina Masli (Indonesia) Poppy Tumengkol	13	6
Third place
(Hong Kong) Diana Leung (Hong Kong) Pang Yuet Mui	0	0
(South Korea) Kim Jong-ja (South Korea) Yoon Im-soon	15	15

== Mixed doubles ==
=== Finals ===
Quarter-finals
(Indonesia) Christian Hadinata (Indonesia) Retno Kustijah	15	15
(Hong Kong) Tsoi Fai (Hong Kong) Pang Yuet Mui	8	5
(Indonesia) Tata Budiman (Indonesia) Poppy Tumengkol	15	15
(Malaysia) Abdul Rahman Mohamed (Malaysia) Sylvia Ng	5	8
(Indonesia) Indra Gunawan (Indonesia) Intan Nurtjahja	15	4	15
(Malaysia) Ng Tat Wai (Malaysia) Rosalind Singha Ang	10	15	13
(Cambodia) Smas Slayman (Cambodia) Thi Do My Lanh	15	15
(Hong Kong) Cheng Kin Chung (Hong Kong) Diana Mui	9	5

Semi-finals
(Indonesia) Christian Hadinata (Indonesia) Retno Kustijah	17	15
(Indonesia) Tata Budiman (Indonesia) Poppy Tumengkol	14	8
(Indonesia) Indra Gunawan (Indonesia) Intan Nurtjahja	15	15
(Cambodia) Smas Slayman (Cambodia) Thi Do My Lanh	12	5

Final
(Indonesia) Christian Hadinata (Indonesia) Retno Kustijah	18	15
(Indonesia) Indra Gunawan (Indonesia) Intan Nurtjahja	13	5
Third place
(Indonesia) Tata Budiman (Indonesia) Poppy Tumengkol	15	15
(Cambodia) Smas Slayman (Cambodia) Thi Do My Lanh	8	9
