= 1975 Uber Cup qualification =

Tournament details
- Dates: 20 September 1974 – 7 April 1975
- Location: Asian zone: Lucknow American zone: Waukesha; European zone: Enschede; Oberhausen; Plymouth; Zweibrücken Australasian zone: Adelaide

The qualifying process for the 1975 Uber Cup took place from 20 September 1974 to 7 April 1975 to decide the final teams which will play in the final tournament.

== Qualification process ==
The qualification process is divided into four regions, the Asian Zone, the American Zone, the European Zone and the Australasian Zone. Teams in their respective zone will compete in a knockout format. Three singles and four doubles will be played on the day of competition. The teams that win their respective zone will earn a place in the final tournament to be held in Jakarta.

The winners of the 1972 Uber Cup, Japan were exempted from the qualifying rounds and automatically qualified for the final tournament. Indonesia also automatically qualified for the final tournament as host nation.

=== Qualified teams ===
Country	Qualified as	Qualified on	Final appearance
Indonesia	1975 Uber Cup hosts	20 September 1974	5th
Japan	1972 Uber Cup winners	11 June 1972	4th
Malaysia	Asian Zone winners	15 February 1975	1st
England	European Zone winners	5 March 1975	4th
Canada	American Zone winners	7 April 1975	5th
Australia	Australasian Zone winners	20 September 1974	1st

== Asian Zone ==
=== Bracket ===
Final
15 February 1975 – Lucknow
India	1
Malaysia	6

=== Final ===
India
1
Lucknow, India
15 February 1975

Malaysia
6

			1	2	3
1	(India) (Malaysia)	Ami Ghia; Sylvia Ng	2; 11	2; 11
2	(India) (Malaysia)	Kanwal Thakar Singh; Rosalind Singha Ang	5; 11	10; 12
3	(India) (Malaysia)	Damayanti Tambay; Katherine Teh	12; 10	3; 11	2; 11
4	(India) (Malaysia)	Ami Ghia / Sujata Jain; Rosalind Singha Ang / Sylvia Ng	1; 15	5; 15
5	(India) (Malaysia)	Morin Mathias / Damayanti Tambay; Sylvia Tan / Yap Hei Lin	15; 8	15; 4
6	(India) (Malaysia)	Morin Mathias / Damayanti Tambay; Rosalind Singha Ang / Sylvia Ng	4; 15	2; 15
7	(India) (Malaysia)	Ami Ghia / Sujata Jain; Sylvia Tan / Yap Hei Lin	16; 17	15; 4	3; 15

== American Zone ==
=== Bracket ===
Final
26 February 1972 – Waukesha
Canada	5
United States	2

=== Final ===
Canada
5
Waukesha, United States
7 April 1975

United States
2

			1	2	3
1	(Canada) (United States)	Jane Youngberg; Cheryl Carton	11; 1	11; 3
2	(Canada) (United States)	Alison Ridgway; Judianne Kelly	11; 7	11; 4
3	(Canada) (United States)	Lesley Harris; Cindy Baker	10; 12	11; 6	11; 6
4	(Canada) (United States)	Wendy Clarkson / Lorraine Thorne; Judianne Kelly / Rosine Lemon	2; 15	5; 15
5	(Canada) (United States)	Jane Youngberg / Barbara Welch; Diane Hales / Carlene Starkey	16; 18	15; 9	15; 11
6	(Canada) (United States)	Jane Youngberg / Barbara Welch; Judianne Kelly / Rosine Lemon	10; 15	15; 13	14; 17
7	(Canada) (United States)	Wendy Clarkson / Lorraine Thorne; Diane Hales / Carlene Starkey	15; 6	15; 1

== European Zone ==
=== Bracket ===
First round
20 November 1974 – Zweibrücken
Scotland	1
West Germany	6
Denmark
Bye
December 1974
Netherlands	w/o
Sweden
England
Bye

Semi-finals
25 January 1975 – Oberhausen
West Germany	1
Denmark	6
6 February 1975 – Enschede
Netherlands	2
England	5

Final
5 March 1975 – Plymouth
Denmark	2
England	5

=== First round ===
West Germany
6
Zweibrücken, West Germany
20 November 1974

Scotland
1

			1	2	3
1	(West Germany) (Scotland)	Brigitte Steden; Anne Johnstone	8; 11	11; 6	11; 8
2	(West Germany) (Scotland)	Marieluise Zizmann; Mary Odell	11; 2	11; 0
3	(West Germany) (Scotland)	Gudrun Ziebold; Christine Cameron	11; 3	11; 1
4	(West Germany) (Scotland)	Brigitte Steden / Marieluise Zizmann; Anne Johnstone / Mary Odell	18; 13	16; 18	15; 9
5	(West Germany) (Scotland)	Karin Kucki / Vera Winter; Helen McIntosh / Christine Stewart	15; 6	8; 15	4; 15
6	(West Germany) (Scotland)	Karin Kucki / Vera Winter; Anne Johnstone / Mary Odell	15; 6	15; 5
7	(West Germany) (Scotland)	Brigitte Steden / Marieluise Zizmann; Helen McIntosh / Christine Stewart	15; 9	15; 10

=== Semi-finals ===
Denmark
6
Oberhausen, West Germany
25 January 1975

West Germany
1

			1	2	3
1	(Denmark) (West Germany)	Lene Køppen; Brigitte Steden	11; 7	11; 5
2	(Denmark) (West Germany)	Jette Føge; Vera Winter	11; 2	11; 6
3	(Denmark) (West Germany)	Lonny Bostofte; Gudrun Ziebold	8; 11	10; 12
4	(Denmark) (West Germany)	Pernille Kaagaard / Imre Nielsen; Karin Kucki / Vera Winter	15; 3	15; 8
5	(Denmark) (West Germany)	Inge Borgstrøm / Lene Køppen; Brigitte Steden / Marieluise Zizmann	15; 7	6; 15	15; 12
6	(Denmark) (West Germany)	Inge Borgstrøm / Lene Køppen; Karin Kucki / Vera Winter	15; 5	15; 12
7	(Denmark) (West Germany)	Pernille Kaagaard / Imre Nielsen; Brigitte Steden / Marieluise Zizmann	8; 15	15; 5	11; 15

England
5
Enschede, Netherlands
6 February 1975

Netherlands
2

			1	2	3
1	(England) (Netherlands)	Gillian Gilks; Joke van Beusekom	11; 4	11; 5
2	(England) (Netherlands)	Margaret Beck; Marjan Luesken	11; 4	11; 1
3	(England) (Netherlands)	Heather Nielsen; Lily Weijers	11; 9	6; 11	2; 11
4	(England) (Netherlands)	Margaret Beck / Gillian Gilks; Marjan Luesken / Joke van Beusekom	15; 9	10; 15	10; 15
5	(England) (Netherlands)	Margaret Boxall / Susan Whetnall; Marja Ridder / Lily Weijers	15; 7	15; 4
6	(England) (Netherlands)	Margaret Beck / Gillian Gilks; Marja Ridder / Lily Weijers	15; 8	15; 7
7	(England) (Netherlands)	Margaret Boxall / Susan Whetnall; Marjan Luesken / Joke van Beusekom	15; 3	15; 2

=== Final ===
Denmark
2
Plymouth, England
5 March 1975

England
5

			1	2	3
1	(Denmark) (England)	Lene Køppen; Gillian Gilks	11; 6	11; 3
2	(Denmark) (England)	Imre Nielsen; Margaret Beck	7; 11	11; 2	2; 11
3	(Denmark) (England)	Jette Føge; Heather Nielsen	11; 5	11; 5
4	(Denmark) (England)	Inge Borgstrøm / Lene Køppen; Margaret Beck / Gillian Gilks	4; 15	6; 15
5	(Denmark) (England)	Pernille Kaagaard / Imre Nielsen; Margaret Boxall / Susan Whetnall	0; 15	5; 15
6	(Denmark) (England)	Pernille Kaagaard / Imre Nielsen; Margaret Beck / Gillian Gilks	15; 18	4; 15
7	(Denmark) (England)	Inge Borgstrøm / Lene Køppen; Margaret Boxall / Susan Whetnall	5; 15	12; 15

== Australasian Zone ==
=== Bracket ===
Final
20 September 1974 – Adelaide
New Zealand	3
Australia	4

=== Final ===
New Zealand
3
Adelaide, Australia
20 September 1974

Australia
4

			1	2	3
1	(New Zealand) (Australia)	Robin Denton; Judy Nyirati	7; 11	9; 12
2	(New Zealand) (Australia)	Alison Branfield; Joan Jones	5; 11	4; 11
3	(New Zealand) (Australia)	Frances Erceg; Kay Terry	8; 11	11; 12
4	(New Zealand) (Australia)	Frances Erceg / Gaynor Weatherley; Pauline Munday / Fay Truscott	15; 6	15; 0
5	(New Zealand) (Australia)	Alison Branfield / Robin Denton; Judy Nyirati / Joan Jones	6; 15	11; 15
6	(New Zealand) (Australia)	Alison Branfield / Robin Denton; Pauline Munday / Fay Truscott	15; 8	15; 2
7	(New Zealand) (Australia)	Frances Erceg / Gaynor Weatherley; Judy Nyirati / Joan Jones	3; 15	10; 15
