= 1972 Singapore Open =

Tournament details
- Dates: 24 October 1972– 28 October 1972
- Edition: 39th
- Venue: Singapore Badminton Hall
- Location: Geylang, Singapore

Champions
- Men's singles: (Indonesia) Iie Sumirat
- Women's singles: (Indonesia) Intan Nurtjahja
- Men's doubles: (Malaysia) Tan Aik Huang (Malaysia) Tan Aik Mong
- Women's doubles: (Indonesia) Regina Masli (Indonesia) Intan Nurtjahja
- Mixed doubles: (Indonesia) Johan Wahjudi (Indonesia) Regina Masli

The 1972 Singapore Open, also known as the 1972 Singapore Open Badminton Championships, took place from 24 to 28 October 1972 at the Singapore Badminton Hall in Singapore.

== Final results ==
Category	Winners	Runners-up	Score
Men's singles	(Indonesia) Iie Sumirat	(Malaysia) Tan Aik Mong	15–5, 15–11
Women's singles	(Indonesia) Intan Nurtjahja	(Indonesia) Taty Sumirah	11–8, 12–11
Men's doubles	(Malaysia) Tan Aik Huang & Tan Aik Mong	(Malaysia) Ng Boon Bee & Punch Gunalan	15–11, retired
Women's doubles	(Indonesia) Regina Masli & Intan Nurtjahja	(Indonesia) Taty Sumirah & Poppy Tumengkol	15–4, 10–15, 15–10
Mixed doubles	(Indonesia) Johan Wahjudi & Regina Masli	(Thailand) Chirasak Champakao & (Singapore) Liem Siew Choo	15–11, 15–7
