= 1980 IBF World Championships – Women's singles =

Badminton championships

Women's singles at the 1980 IBF World Championships
- Venue: Istora
- Location: Jakarta, Indonesia
- Dates: May 27, 1980 – June 1, 1980

Medalists
gold medal	Verawaty Wiharjo	Indonesia
silver medal	Ivana Lie	Indonesia
bronze medal	Lene Køppen	Denmark
bronze medal	Taty Sumirah	Indonesia

The 1980 IBF World Championships were held in Jakarta, Indonesia in 1980. Following the results of the women's singles.

== Main stage ==
=== Section 1 ===
First round
(Indonesia) Verawaty Wiharjo
(Chinese Taipei) Kong Chai Yee
(Japan) Fumiko Tookairin
(Australia) Julie McDonald
(Netherlands) Joke van Beusekom
(Canada) Linda Cloutier	11	12
(Malaysia) Khaw Moo Leng	3	11
(England) Karen Bridge
(Denmark) Pia Nielsen

Second round
(Indonesia) Verawaty Wiharjo	11	11
(Chinese Taipei) Kong Chai Yee	1	2
(Japan) Fumiko Tookairin	11	11
(Australia) Julie McDonald	5	9
(Netherlands) Joke van Beusekom	11	11
(Canada) Linda Cloutier	3	5
(England) Karen Bridge	7	11	11
(Denmark) Pia Nielsen	11	6	5

Third round
(Indonesia) Verawaty Wiharjo	11	11
(Japan) Fumiko Tookairin	2	0
(Netherlands) Joke van Beusekom	11	2	11
(England) Karen Bridge	4	11	7

Quarterfinals
(Indonesia) Verawaty Wiharjo	11	11
(Netherlands) Joke van Beusekom	6	1

=== Section 2 ===
First round
(Indonesia) Taty Sumirah	11	11
(Australia) Sue Daly	6	7
(India) Ami Ghia	11	11
(England) Karen Chapman	4	8
(Denmark) Kirsten Larsen
(Netherlands) Hanke de Kort
(England) Wendy Carter
(Japan) Yoshiko Yonekura
(Chinese Taipei) Chen Yuk Jen
(Malaysia) Leong Chai Lean

Second round
(Indonesia) Taty Sumirah	11	11
(India) Ami Ghia	4	6
(Denmark) Kirsten Larsen	11	11
(Netherlands) Hanke de Kort	8	5
(England) Wendy Carter	11	6	11
(Japan) Yoshiko Yonekura	8	11	5
(Chinese Taipei) Chen Yuk Jen	11	11
(Malaysia) Leong Chai Lean	3	2

Third round
(Indonesia) Taty Sumirah	12	11
(Denmark) Kirsten Larsen	10	3
(England) Wendy Carter	11	11	12
(Chinese Taipei) Chen Yuk Jen	12	6	10

Quarterfinals
(Indonesia) Taty Sumirah	11	11
(England) Wendy Carter	7	9

=== Section 3 ===
First round
(Indonesia) Ivana Lie
(Switzerland) Liselotte Blumer
(England) Sally Leadbeater
(Chinese Taipei) Huang Shui Chi
(Japan) Hiroe Yuki
(India) Amita Kulkarni
(Canada) Jane Youngberg	11	11
(Australia) Audrey Swaby	3	4
(Netherlands) Marjan Ridder	11	11
(Malaysia) Chee Geok Whee	5	7

Second round
(Indonesia) Ivana Lie	11	11
(Switzerland) Liselotte Blumer	1	5
(England) Sally Leadbeater	12	11
(Chinese Taipei) Huang Shui Chi	9	4
(Japan) Hiroe Yuki	11	11
(India) Amita Kulkarni	3	1
(Canada) Jane Youngberg	11	12
(Netherlands) Marjan Ridder	8	11

Third round
(Indonesia) Ivana Lie	11	11
(England) Sally Leadbeater	0	5
(Japan) Hiroe Yuki	11	11
(Canada) Jane Youngberg	7	8

Quarterfinals
(Indonesia) Ivana Lie	11	11
(Japan) Hiroe Yuki	3	2

=== Section 4 ===
First round
(Denmark) Lene Køppen
(Malaysia) Katherine Teh
(England) Jane Webster
(United States) Utami Kinard
(Japan) Saori Kondo
(Chinese Taipei) Lai Chuk
(Indonesia) Tjan So Gwan	12	11
(Australia) Robyn Hobba	11	3
(Norway) Else Thoresen	12	12
(Canada) Joanne Falardeau	9	9

Second round
(Denmark) Lene Køppen	11	11
(Malaysia) Katherine Teh	2	0
(England) Jane Webster	11	11	11
(United States) Utami Kinard	12	2	8
(Japan) Saori Kondo	11	11
(Chinese Taipei) Lai Chuk	3	4
(Indonesia) Tjan So Gwan	11	6	11
(Norway) Else Thoresen	1?	11	2

Third round
(Denmark) Lene Køppen	11	11
(England) Jane Webster	2	6
(Japan) Saori Kondo	11	11
(Indonesia) Tjan So Gwan	6	6

Quarterfinals
(Denmark) Lene Køppen	11	11
(Japan) Saori Kondo	4	2

== Final stage ==
Quarterfinals
1	(Indonesia) Verawaty Wiharjo	11	11
8	(Netherlands) Joke van Beusekom	6	1
4	(Indonesia) Taty Sumirah	11	11
5	(England) Wendy Carter	7	9
3	(Indonesia) Ivana Lie	11	11
6	(Japan) Hiroe Yuki	3	2
2	(Denmark) Lene Køppen	11	11
7	(Japan) Saori Kondo	4	2

Semifinals
(Indonesia) Verawaty Wiharjo	11	8	11
(Indonesia) Taty Sumirah	4	11	3
(Indonesia) Ivana Lie	12	11
(Denmark) Lene Køppen	11	2

Finals
(Indonesia) Verawaty Wiharjo	11	11
(Indonesia) Ivana Lie	1	3
