= Rudy Hartono =

Indonesian badminton player

Rudy Hartono Kurniawan
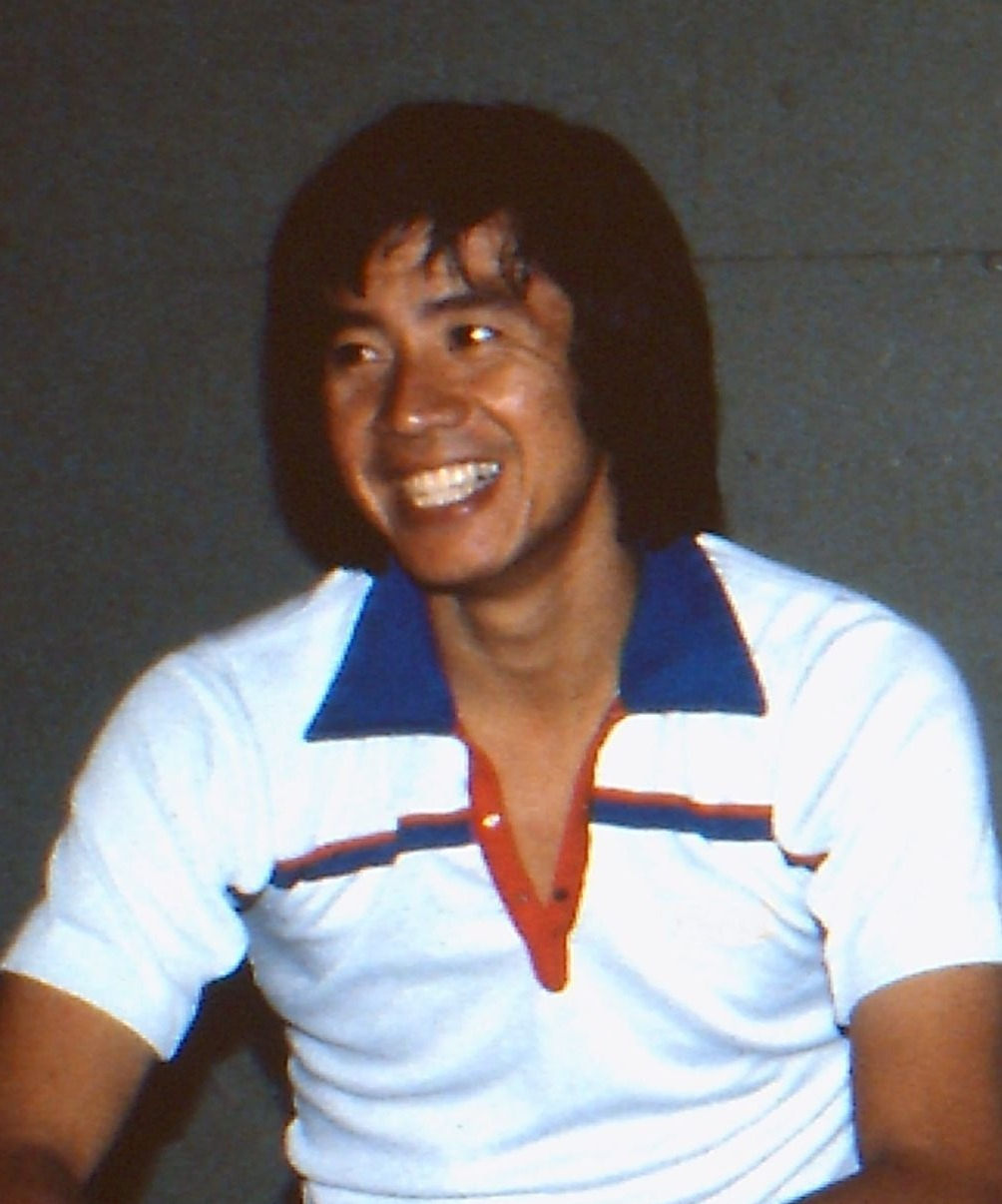
- Hartono in 1980

Personal information
- Born: Nio Hap Liang 梁海量; 18 August 1949 (age 77) Surabaya, East Java, Indonesia
- Height: 1.82 m (6 ft 0 in)

Sport
- Country: Indonesia
- Sport: Badminton
- Handedness: Right
- Event: Men's singles Men's doubles Mixed doubles
Medal record
Men's badminton
Representing Indonesia
World Championships
Gold medal – first place	1980 Jakarta	Men's singles
Thomas Cup
Gold medal – first place	1970 Kuala Lumpur	Men's team
Gold medal – first place	1973 Jakarta	Men's team
Gold medal – first place	1976 Bangkok	Men's team
Gold medal – first place	1979 Jakarta	Men's team
Silver medal – second place	1967 Jakarta	Men's team
Silver medal – second place	1982 London	Men's team
Asian Games
Gold medal – first place	1970 Bangkok	Men's team
Bronze medal – third place	1970 Bangkok	Men's doubles
Bronze medal – third place	1970 Bangkok	Mixed doubles
Asian Championships
Gold medal – first place	1971 Jakarta	Men's team

Rudy Hartono Kurniawan (born Nio Hap Liang (Chinese: 梁海量; pinyin: Liáng Hǎiliàng; Pe̍h-ōe-jī: Niô͘ Hái-liâng); 18 August 1949) is an Indonesian former badminton player holding the record of winning the men's singles title at the All-England Championship eight times, including seven times consecutively from 1968 to 1974. He won the World Championships in 1980 on his only attempt at this title. Widely regarded as a badminton icon, he is considered to be one of the greatest badminton players of all time.

== Early life ==
Hartono was born on 18 August 1949 as Nio Hap Liang in Surabaya. He is the son of Zulkarnain Kurniawan and the third child of eight siblings in the family. His sister Utami Dewi is a five-time national badminton champion and former Indonesia Uber Cup team member. The family lived in Jalan Basuki Rachmat and owned tailoring and dairy farming businesses. The young Hartono embraced many types of sports, including athletics, swimming, volleyball, football, and roller skating, but his athletic path soon led him towards badminton.

At age 11, Hartono started formal badminton training under the tutelage of his father. He would train for almost the entire day in a small badminton club set up by his father in a railway station warehouse. In 1961, he entered his first tournament at the Surabaya's junior championship when he was 12 and won. After leaving his father's club, Hartono would later play for the much bigger Rajawali Club where many good Indonesian badminton players were trained. At age 15, he won the national junior championship. While competing in municipal tournaments, the teenage Hartono soon caught the eye of the national scouts and was drafted into the National Training Center in late 1965 to help the national team in the upcoming Thomas Cup.

== Badminton career ==
As a member of the 1967 Thomas Cup squad, Hartono won all of his matches, but Indonesia was beaten by Malaysia in a highly controversial final in which play was suspended due to the unruly crowd. Both teams were later offered a chance to resume their clash in New Zealand but Indonesia declined, thus handing Malaysia the cup.

A year later, on his first try at the All England Championships, the 18-year-old Hartono became the youngest ever champion of the tournament, beating Tan Aik Huang from Malaysia who had been the winner two years earlier. From then on, he dominated the event like very few had before, winning seven titles consecutively from 1968 to 1974. In 1975, in search of his eighth consecutive title and the chance to break Erland Kops’s record of seven, Hartono would once again face the challenge of his archrival, Svend Pri, who he had beaten before in the 1970 and 1972 finals, but this time he was not able to fend off the Dane’s attack and fell to a 11–15, 14–17 defeat. Hartono, however, came back the following year to win his eighth title against his compatriot Liem Swie King thus becoming the most successful men’s singles player in the history of the tournament. His eight titles at the All England also earned Hartono a mention in the Guinness Book of Records. In 1978, Hartono would return to try his hand for a ninth title, but he could not overcome Liem Swie King and lost 10–15, 3–15 in the final. He attempted another comeback in 1981, but lost in the semi-finals to Prakash Padukone in a three sets battle, 15–10, 7–15, 8–15.

Rudy Hartono (left) with Arnold Kilpatrick and runner-up Muljadi at the 1969 U.S. Open.

Besides his All England success, Hartono won many international open titles throughout his career. In 1969, he won the Canadian and the US Open titles after defeating Sture Johnsson and his compatriot Muljadi in the respective finals. In the same year, he also won both the Singapore Open men's singles and doubles titles. He defeated Muljadi in the singles final and partnered with Indratno to beat Lee Wah Chin and Yeo Ah Seng in the doubles final. In 1971, he won his second Canadian Open title and clinched his first Denmark Open title after defeating Ippei Kojima on both occasions. He also competed in the Western Indian Championship that year and won a hat trick of titles, beating Muljadi in the men's singles final, partnered with Indra Gunawan to beat Muljadi and Sumiratta in the men's doubles final and partnered with Rafia Latif to beat Indra Gunawan and Sunila Ape in the mixed doubles final. In 1973 and 1975, Hartono won his second and third Denmark Open titles after beating Flemming Delfs and Svend Pri respectively. In 1981, he would win his maiden Japan Open title after beating his compatriot Lius Pongoh in the final.

Hartono also had some success in major games. At the 1970 Asian Games held in Bangkok, he won gold in the men's team event and two bronze in the men's doubles and mixed doubles events. In 1971, he would win another gold at the Asian Championships where Indonesia defeated Malaysia in the men's team final. In the 1972 Munich Games in which badminton was presented as a demonstration sport, Hartono won the men’s singles event, after beating Jamie Paulson of Canada in the first round, Sture Johnsson of Sweden in the semi-finals, and Svend Pri of Denmark in the final. In his attempt to win an 'official' world championships, Hartono participated in the 1980 IBF World Championships held in Jakarta and managed to reach the final where he would meet his successor Liem Swie King. In a final that lacked intensity, Hartono prevailed in two straight games with the score of 15–9, 15–9.

Since his debut in 1967, Hartono remained active in the Thomas Cup competition and continued to play for his country at the event from 1970 to 1982. The 1970, 1973, 1976, and 1979 Thomas Cup would turn out to be a resounding success for Hartono and his team, with Indonesia sweeping four straight titles. At the 1982 Thomas Cup Finals, the aging Hartono once again answered the call of his nation but his play was not on par with his previous performances and he was not able to help his team to prevent China from winning their first ever Thomas Cup title. Hartono’s defeat in the third singles to Luan Jin was only his second defeat in the competition with the first coming in 1973 when he lost against his long-time nemesis Svend Pri. After the competition, Hartono announced his retirement, saying "I believe I have to retire now... Actually, I was already retired. But this was the Thomas Cup and my country needed me and because I live in Indonesia and I love Indonesia, I must do what they ask."

== Post-retirement ==
Hartono became involved with the Indonesian Badminton Association (PBSI), holding different positions such as Chairman of Development Affairs until 2006. He is currently a member of PBSI’s Board of Honour. Hartono also played an active role within the Badminton World Federation (BWF). He was a member of the Council in 1985-1986, and later from 1994 to 2009. Hartono’s image and reputation led the United Nations Development Programme (UNDP) to appoint him as a Goodwill Ambassador for Indonesia.

Hartono who attended the Economics Faculty of Trisakti University, Jakarta, also began to expand his business after his retirement. He ventured into dairy business in Sukabumi and also the sports equipment business by acting as an agent for brands such as Mikasa, Ascot and Yonex. Then through PT Havilah Citra Footwear founded in 1996, he imported various kinds of sportswear.

== Personal life ==
Hartono married Jane Anwar in 1976 and they have two children, a son (Christopher) and a daughter (Christine).

In the late 70s and early 80s, age began to catch up to Hartono and he started losing matches. This resulted in his depression. He credits a preacher for his "conversion experience" to Christianity during his mid-30s. Later, the death of Svend Pri in 1983 prompted Hartono to preach about Jesus to others. In 1988, Hartono had coronary bypass surgery in Australia. Since 1989, Hartono has been extremely active with his church ministry. In 2001, Hartono became associate pastor of Bethel Church in Jakarta, Indonesia.

A film lover, Hartono once starred in an Indonesian movie titled "Matinja Seorang Bidadari" (Death of An Angel) in 1971.

Hartono also had a wax sculpture in his likeness at the Madame Tussauds museum in Singapore.

== Honours and awards ==
- 1969 and 1974 – SIWO/PWI best athlete
- 1985 – IBF Distinguished Service Award
- 1986 – IBF Herbert Scheele Trophy
- 1987 – Honorary Diploma from the International Committee For Fair Play (CIFP)
- 1988 – Fair Play Award from the United Nations Educational, Scientific and Cultural Organisation (UNESCO)
- 1997 – IBF Hall of Fame
- 2000 – Republic of Indonesia's Honorary Sign for Bintang Mahaputera Utama
- 2006 – Asian Heroes, TIME Magazine

== Achievements ==
=== Olympic Games (demonstration) ===
Men's singles
Year	Venue	Opponent	Score	Result	Ref.
1972	Volleyballhalle, Munich, West Germany	(Denmark) Svend Pri	15–6, 15–1	Gold	

=== World Championships ===
Men's singles
Year	Venue	Opponent	Score	Result	Ref.
1980	Istora Senayan, Jakarta, Indonesia	(Indonesia) Liem Swie King	15–9, 15–9	Gold	

=== Asian Games ===
Men's doubles
Year	Venue	Partner	Opponent	Score	Result	Ref.
1970	Kittikachorn Stadium, Bangkok, Thailand	(Indonesia) Indra Gunawan	(Malaysia) Punch Gunalan (Malaysia) Ng Boon Bee	12–15, 15–10, 10–15	Bronze	

Mixed doubles
Year	Venue	Partner	Opponent	Score	Result	Ref.
1970	Kittikachorn Stadium, Bangkok, Thailand	(Indonesia) Minarni	(Thailand) Bandid Jaiyen (Thailand) Achara Pattabongs	Walkover	Bronze	

=== International tournaments (25 titles, 10 runners-up) ===
Men's singles
Year	Tournament	Opponent	Score	Result	Ref.
1966	Perak Open	(Malaysia) Tan Aik Huang	8–15, 15–11, 3–15	(silver) Runner-up	
1968	All England Open	(Malaysia) Tan Aik Huang	15–12, 15–9	(gold) Winner	
1968	Singapore Pesta	(Indonesia) Darmadi	9–15, 15–7, 10–15	(silver) Runner-up	
1968	Northern Indian	(Indonesia) Muljadi	15–2, 15–10	(gold) Winner	
1968	Western Indian	(Indonesia) Darmadi	17–14, 18–14	(gold) Winner	
1969	All England Open	(Indonesia) Darmadi	15–1, 15–3	(gold) Winner	
1969	U.S. Open	(Indonesia) Muljadi	15–9, 15–12	(gold) Winner	
1969	Canadian Open	(Sweden) Sture Johnsson	15–11, 15–1	(gold) Winner	
1969	Singapore Open	(Indonesia) Muljadi	15–7, 15–4	(gold) Winner	
1970	All England Open	(Denmark) Svend Pri	15–7, 15–1	(gold) Winner	
1971	Western Indian	(Indonesia) Muljadi	15–11, 15–12	(gold) Winner	
1971	Denmark Open	(Japan) Ippei Kojima	14–18, 15–14, 15–11	(gold) Winner	
1971	All England Open	(Indonesia) Muljadi	15–1, 15–5	(gold) Winner	
1971	Canadian Open	(Japan) Ippei Kojima	15–7, 15–2	(gold) Winner	
1971	U.S. Open	(Indonesia) Muljadi	8–15, 9–15	(silver) Runner-up	
1972	All England Open	(Denmark) Svend Pri	15–9, 15–4	(gold) Winner	
1972	Jakarta Open	(Indonesia) Iie Sumirat	15–4, 15–5	(gold) Winner	
1973	All England Open	(Indonesia) Christian Hadinata	15–4, 15–2	(gold) Winner	
1973	Denmark Open	(Denmark) Flemming Delfs	17–14, 15–12	(gold) Winner	
1974	All England Open	(Malaysia) Punch Gunalan	8–15, 15–9, 15–10	(gold) Winner	
1975	All England Open	(Denmark) Svend Pri	11–15, 14–17	(silver) Runner-up	
1975	Denmark Open	(Denmark) Svend Pri	12–15, 15–0, 15–7	(gold) Winner	
1976	All England Open	(Indonesia) Liem Swie King	15–7, 15–7	(gold) Winner	
1978	All England Open	(Indonesia) Liem Swie King	10–15, 3–15	(silver) Runner-up	
1980	English Masters	(Indonesia) Liem Swie King	11–15, 3–15	(silver) Runner-up	
1980	Swedish Open	(India) Prakash Padukone	15–9, 12–15, 1–15	(silver) Runner-up	
1981	Japan Open	(Indonesia) Lius Pongoh	15–9, 15–8	(gold) Winner	

Men's doubles
Year	Tournament	Partner	Opponent	Score	Result	Ref.
1966	Penang Open	(Indonesia) Ang Tjin Siang	(Malaysia) Teh Kew San (Malaysia) Yew Cheng Hoe	0–15, 0–15	(silver) Runner-up	
1968	Northern Indian	(Indonesia) Indratno	(Malaysia) Punch Gunalan (Malaysia) Tan Yee Khan	3–15, 15–6, 15–7	(gold) Winner	
1968	Western Indian	(Indonesia) Indratno	(Malaysia) Ng Boon Bee (Malaysia) Tan Yee Khan	15–10, 15–10	(gold) Winner	
1969	Singapore Open	(Indonesia) Indratno	(Singapore) Lee Wah Chin (Singapore) Yeo Ah Seng	15–4, 15–6	(gold) Winner	
1971	Western Indian	(Indonesia) Indra Gunawan	(Indonesia) Muljadi (Indonesia) Sumiratta	18–13, 15–12	(gold) Winner	
1971	Denmark Open	(Indonesia) Indra Gunawan	(Malaysia) Punch Gunalan (Malaysia) Ng Boon Bee	15–11, 4–15, 8–15	(silver) Runner-up	
1971	All England Open	(Indonesia) Indra Gunawan	(Malaysia) Punch Gunalan (Malaysia) Ng Boon Bee	5–15, 3–15	(silver) Runner-up	

Mixed doubles
Year	Tournament	Partner	Opponent	Score	Result	Ref.
1971	Western Indian	(India) Rafia Latif	(Indonesia) Indra Gunawan (India) Sunila Ape	15–12, 15–13	(gold) Winner	

=== Invitational tournament ===
Men's singles
Year	Tournament	Opponent	Score	Result	Ref.
1972	World Invitational Championships	(Denmark) Svend Pri	15–5, 15–2	Gold	
