= Jeff Robson (sportsman) =

New Zealand badminton and tennis player (1926–2022)

Jeff Robson MBE
Personal information
- Born: Jeffrey Ellis Robson; 30 September 1926 Palmerston, New Zealand
- Died: 5 September 2022 (aged 95) Auckland, New Zealand
- Education: University of Otago
- Spouse: Heather Redwood (m. 1953; died 2019)

Sport
- Country: New Zealand
- Sport: Tennis, badminton

Jeffrey Ellis Robson MBE (30 September 1926 – 5 September 2022) was a New Zealand badminton and tennis player.

== Early life and family ==
Born in Palmerston on 30 September 1926, Robson was the son of Maurice Alexander Robson, who later served as president of the New Zealand Badminton Federation between 1965 and 1967. He was educated at King's High School, Dunedin, where he represented the school in association football.

In 1951, Robson graduated from the University of Otago with a Bachelor of Dental Surgery.

In 1953, he married Heather Redwood, who also played international badminton for New Zealand. The couple had one child.

== Sporting career ==
=== Badminton ===
As a badminton player, Robson won nine New Zealand singles championships, seven national men's doubles and four mixed doubles titles.

=== Tennis ===
In tennis, Robson won the New Zealand men's singles title three times, in 1949, 1952 and 1956. He also won five national men's doubles titles, and twice won the national mixed doubles championship. He represented New Zealand in the Davis Cup for three years, and was later the team captain.

== Honours and awards ==
In the 1976 New Year Honours, Robson was appointed a Member of the Order of the British Empire, for services to tennis and badminton. In 1990, he was inducted into the New Zealand Sports Hall of Fame. That same year, Robson was awarded the New Zealand 1990 Commemoration Medal.

== Later life and death ==
Robson's wife Heather died in Auckland on 11 October 2019. Robson died in Auckland on 5 September 2022, at the age of 95.
