= Ralph Creed Meredith =

Irish Anglican cleric and badminton player

The Venerable Ralph Creed Meredith
- Born: 7 October 1887; Dublin, Ireland
- Died: 10 January 1970 (aged 82); Poole, Dorset, England
- Occupations: Vicar, Archdeacon, Chaplain
- Spouse: Sylvia Aynsley (1894-1987)
- Relatives: Sir James Creed Meredith, father James Creed Meredith, brother Thomas Meredith, great-grandfather, Richard Edmund Meredith, cousin William Collis Meredith, great-uncle Edmund Allen Meredith, great-uncle Rowan Gillespie, grand-nephew Carew Arthur Meredith, cousin

Ralph Creed Meredith (7 October 1887 – 10 January 1970) was an Anglican cleric who succeeded Edward Keble Talbot as Chaplain to His Majesty, King George VI and afterwards Her Majesty Queen Elizabeth II. In New Zealand he was president of the New Zealand Badminton Association and the New Zealand Croquet Association.

The son of Sir James Creed Meredith, and a brother of Judge James Creed Meredith, Meredith was born in Dublin, Ireland. He was educated at Rhos College in North Wales and afterwards at Trinity College Dublin, receiving his B.A. in Ethics and Logic with Honors after the Michaelmas Term in 1909. Meredith earned his M.A. at Trinity in 1912. He married Sylvia Aynsley (1894–1987) on 21 April 1915, daughter of Joseph Aynsley of Blythe House, near Stoke-on-Trent, Staffordshire.

According to the 1932 Crockford's Clerical Directory, in succession became a curate at Caverswall, Meir, Staffordshire (1912–1914), curate at St. Bartholomew's Church, Armley, Leeds (1914–1917), served the Diocese of Lichfield (1917–1918), was curate of St. Peter's Church, Harborne, Birmingham (1919–1920), and eventually took charge of the Conventional District of Bournville, a village south of Birmingham diocese from 1920 to 1924. His successes at Bournville led the Bishop of Wellington to appoint Meredith Vicar of Whanganui, New Zealand in 1924, where he remained until 1932. He eventually became Archdeacon of Waitotara (1925–1932) as well, despite using addresses in both New Zealand and Hertfordshire, England during that time.

Meredith was a Freemason and an athlete of some note. After arriving in New Zealand in 1924, he was the winner of several New Zealand National Badminton Championships in 1927 and 1928, and was a world class croquet player, having performed for the New Zealand team competing for the 1930 MacRobertson International Croquet Shield, which fell to Australia, 3–0. Meredith also competed in numerous croquet tournaments in southern England and Ireland after relocating from The Vicarage in Windsor to Parkstone, Dorset. Meredith had a club foot and wore a surgical boot during competition, as well as his clerical "dog collar."

Meredith is credited with being the "prime mover" in the 1927 formation of Badminton New Zealand (then known as the New Zealand Badminton Association), of which he was president for two years. He was also president of the New Zealand Croquet Association and the Manawatu Association.

Meredith required surgery in April 1931 and had travelled to England for the procedure. On his return voyage, emergency surgery was required during a stopover in Port Said, Egypt. Subsequently, in poor health, he accepted an offer from the Marquess of Salisbury to take over the Parish of Cheshunt, Diocese of St Albans, in Hertfordshire in 1932. According to Kelly's 1933 and 1937 Directories of Hertfordshire, Meredith served as Vicar at St. Mary the Virgin and was rural dean of Ware, Hertfordshire, residing at The Vicarage, Churchgate. He also served as Vicar of St John the Baptist Church, Windsor, 1940–1958.

In 1946, Meredith was appointed Chaplain to His Majesty, King George VI and retained a place in the College of Chaplains of the Ecclesiastical Household of Elizabeth II on 5 August 1952. Meredith died in Poole, Dorset, England, where he had served as Rural Dean since 1962.
