= Tonny Holst-Christensen =

Danish badminton player

Personal information
- Born: Tonny Petersen; 25 January 1936
- Died: 11 August 2024 (aged 88)

Sport
- Country: Denmark
- Sport: Badminton
Medal record
Women's badminton
Representing Denmark
Uber Cup
Silver medal – second place	1960 Philadelphia	Women's team

Tonny Holst-Christensen (née Petersen) was a Danish badminton player. In 1962, the Badminton Association of Denmark decided not to enter Tonny in the All England Championships and she had to pay for the trip to England out of her own pocket. She then teamed up with Judy Devlin and remarkably won the title. She also won the Danish National Championship in 1956 and 1960 and was a member of the 1960 Uber Cup team. After retiring, She stayed with badminton mainly as coaches for 30 years. She died on 11 August 2024, at the age of 88.

== Personal life ==
Tonny was married to Bjorn, who is also badminton player and had 4 children, including a fellow All England Open winner like her in 1993, Jon Holst-Christensen.

== Achievements ==
=== International tournaments (11 titles, 5 runners-up) ===
Women's singles
Year	Tournament	Opponent	Score	Result
1957	Scottish Open	(Denmark) Tonny Ahm	11–7, 2–11, 9–11	(silver) Runner-up
1959	Belgian International	(Denmark) Inger Kjærgaard	8–11, 11–2, 11–5	(gold) Winner
1960	Scottish Open	(Denmark) Inge Hasselsteen	6–11, 5–11	(silver) Runner-up
1961	Dutch Open	(Denmark) Hanne Jensen	11–3, 0–11, 3–11	(silver) Runner-up
1961	Swedish Open	(Denmark) Hanne Andersen	11–0, 11–8	(gold) Winner
1961	Swiss Open	(Denmark) Inge Hasselsteen	11–0, 11–2	(gold) Winner
1962	German Open	(United States) Judy Hashman	2–11, 3–11	(silver) Runner-up

Women's doubles
Year	Tournament	Partner	Opponent	Score	Result
1957	Scottish Open	(Denmark) Tonny Ahm	(Republic of Ireland) Yvonne Kelly (Republic of Ireland) Mary O'Sullivan	15–10, 4–15, 15–7	(gold) Winner
1959	Belgian International	(Denmark) Inger Kjærgaard	(England) Barbara Carpenter (England) Heather Ward	8–15, 9–15	(silver) Runner-up
1960	Scottish Open	(Denmark) Inge Hasselsteen	(Scotland) Maggie Macintosh (Scotland) Wilma Tyre	15–7, 15–5	(gold) Winner
1961	Swedish Open	(Denmark) Hanne Andersen	(Denmark) Else Madsen (Denmark) Grethe Ferløv	15–11, 15–7	(gold) Winner
1962	German Open	(United States) Judy Hashman	(Denmark) Karin Jørgensen (Denmark) Ulla Rasmussen	15–12, 15–9	(gold) Winner
1962	All England Open	(United States) Judy Hashman	(Denmark) Karin Jørgensen (Denmark) Ulla Rasmussen	15–5, 15–3	(gold) Winner

Mixed doubles
Year	Tournament	Partner	Opponent	Score	Result
1961	Dutch Open	(Denmark) Bjørn Holst-Christensen	(Denmark) Ole Mertz (Denmark) Hanne Jensen	15–4, 15–4	(gold) Winner
1961	Swedish Open	(Denmark) Bjørn Holst-Christensen	(Denmark) Leif Jensen (Denmark) Hanne Andersen	15–11, 15–7	(gold) Winner
1961	Swiss Open	(Denmark) Bjørn Holst-Christensen	(Denmark) Ole Mertz (Denmark) Inge Hasselsteen	15–4, 15–5	(gold) Winner
