= Darmawan =

Darmawan is a name. People with the name include:

- Rahmad Darmawan
- Windu Andi Darmawan
- Rizky Darmawan
- Darmawan Mangunkusumo
