= Indra Gunawan (badminton) =

Indonesian badminton player and coach

Personal information
- Born: Lie Tjuan Sien; 23 September 1947 Surakarta, Indonesia
- Died: 7 June 2009 (aged 61) Jakarta, Indonesia

Sport
- Country: Indonesia
- Sport: Badminton
- Handedness: Right
- Event: Men's doubles
Medal record
Men's badminton
Representing Indonesia
Thomas Cup
Gold medal – first place	1970 Kuala Lumpur	Men's team
Gold medal – first place	1973 Jakarta	Men's team
Asian Games
Gold medal – first place	1970 Bangkok	Men's team
Bronze medal – third place	1970 Bangkok	Men's doubles
Asian Championships
Gold medal – first place	1971 Jakarta	Men's team
Gold medal – first place	1971 Jakarta	Men's doubles
Silver medal – second place	1971 Jakarta	Mixed doubles

Indra Gunawan (23 September 1947 in Surakarta – 7 June 2009 in Jakarta) was an Indonesian badminton player and coach.

== Profile ==
He was a former player from Indonesia and was specialized in men's doubles. As a coach he was the National coach from both Indonesia and Malaysia. Gunawan finished third in the 1970 Asian Games in doubles with Rudy Hartono and won the Men's team gold for Indonesia at the 1970 Asian Games event in Bangkok, Thailand. In the 1970 Thomas Cup in Kuala Lumpur, he became men's team world champion with the Indonesian squad, as well as 1973 in Jakarta, where he however was not selected in the final. In 1971 he won the Asian Cup in Men's doubles with Nara Sudjana in Jakarta. In the All England, he reached the final in 1971, and 1973 the semifinals.

=== Career Coach ===
Indra was a former National coach for both Indonesia and Malaysia. He was head coach of the Indonesian team at the Pelatnas of PBSI in the nineties. The Indonesian came to Malaysia as the singles chief coach in 2001 and together with doubles chief coach Park Joo-bong, the duo nearly helped Malaysia to win the Thomas Cup Finals in 2002 in Guangzhou. Malaysia went down 2–3 to Indonesia in the final but Indra will be remembered for his faith and gamble on exposing younger players, especially Lee Tsuen Seng. Indra was also known for his compassion for senior players. He gave former Malaysian internationals Ong Ewe Hock and Yong Hock Kin a second chance to salvage their positions in the National team of Malaysia. Indra was well known for his key part in Malaysian world famous player Lee Chong Wei’s amazing international debut, back when he was head coach for the National team of Malaysia. Chong Wei was only 17-years-old when he joined the National team under Indra. Thanks to a good foundation laid by Indra, Chong Wei began his journey as the king of the local badminton circuit. Indra was also the manager of the six-court Wira Hall in Jakarta. As one of the most respected figures of the badminton world tour, Indra Gunawan died at the Pantai Indah Kapuk Hospital, in his home of Jakarta on June 7th, 2009, at the age of 61, after a long disease – Indra was diagnosed with colon cancer.

=== Personal life ===
Indra was married and left behind his wife Dewi Mirida and three children.

== Achievements ==
=== Asian Games ===
Men's doubles
Year	Venue	Partner	Opponent	Score	Result	Ref.
1970	Kittikachorn Stadium, Bangkok, Thailand	(Indonesia) Rudy Hartono	(Malaysia) Ng Boon Bee (Malaysia) Punch Gunalan	12–15, 15–10, 10–15	Bronze	

=== Asian Championships ===
Men's doubles
Year	Venue	Partner	Opponent	Score	Result	Ref.
1971	Istora Senayan, Jakarta, Indonesia	(Indonesia) Nara Sudjana	(Indonesia) Tjun Tjun (Indonesia) Tata Budiman	15–8, 12–15, 15–11	Gold	

Mixed doubles
Year	Venue	Partner	Opponent	Score	Result	Ref.
1971	Istora Senayan, Jakarta, Indonesia	(Indonesia) Intan Nurtjahja	(Indonesia) Christian Hadinata (Indonesia) Retno Kustijah	13–18, 5–15	Silver	

=== International tournaments (2 titles, 4 runners-up) ===
Men's doubles
Year	Tournament	Partner	Opponent	Score	Result	Ref.
1970	Singapore Open	(Indonesia) Indratno	(Indonesia) Iie Sumirat (Indonesia) Nara Sudjana	15–10, 15–7	(gold) Winner	
1971	Western Indian	(Indonesia) Rudy Hartono	(Indonesia) Muljadi (Indonesia) Sumiratta	18–13, 15–12	(gold) Winner	
1971	Denmark Open	(Indonesia) Rudy Hartono	(Malaysia) Ng Boon Bee (Malaysia) Punch Gunalan	15–11, 4–15, 8–15	(silver) Runner-up	
1971	All England	(Indonesia) Rudy Hartono	(Malaysia) Ng Boon Bee (Malaysia) Punch Gunalan	5–15, 3–15	(silver) Runner-up	
1973	India Open	(Indonesia) Amril Nurman	(England) Elliot Stuart (England) Derek Talbot	11–15, 8–15	(silver) Runner-up	
1973	Singapore Open	(Indonesia) Christian Hadinata	(Indonesia) Tjun Tjun (Indonesia) Johan Wahjudi	11–15, 11–15	(silver) Runner-up	
