= 1975 Uber Cup =

1975 Uber Cup Piala Uber 1975
Tournament details
- Dates: 31 May – 6 June 1975
- Edition: 7th
- Level: International
- Nations: 6
- Venue: Istora Senayan
- Location: Jakarta, Indonesia

The 1975 Uber Cup was the seventh edition of the Uber Cup, the women's badminton team competition. The tournament took place in the 1974-75 badminton season, 14 countries competed. Indonesia won its first title in the Uber Cup, after beating the defending champion Japan in the Final Round in Jakarta.

== Qualification ==
14 teams from 4 regions took part in the competition. As defending champions, Japan skipped the qualifications and played directly in the second round of the inter-zone ties (team matches), effectively the semifinals of the tournament.

Means of qualification	Date	Venue	Slot	Qualified teams
Host country	12 January 1974	Jakarta	1	Indonesia
1972 Uber Cup	7 – 11 June 1972	Tokyo	1	Japan
Asian Zone	15 February 1975	Lucknow	1	Malaysia
American Zone	7 April 1975	Waukesha	1	Canada
European Zone	20 November 1974 – 5 March 1975	Enschede; Oberhausen; Plymouth; Zweibrücken	1	England
Australasian Zone	20 September 1974	Adelaide	1	Australia
Total			6	

From the qualifying rounds, four countries progressed to the inter-zone ties. From the Australasian zone, Australia advanced to the next round after beating New Zealand 4–3. From the Asian zone, Malaysia beat India 6–1. In the European zone final, England defeated Denmark 5–2. From the Pan American zone, Canada advanced to the inter-zone ties after defeating the United States 5–2.

== Knockout stage ==
The following four teams, shown by region, qualified for the 1975 Uber Cup. In the first round, Indonesia defeated debutants Malaysia 7–0 while Canada defeated Australia in a thrilling 4–3 encounter. In the second round, defending champions Japan defeated Canada 6–1 while hosts Indonesia beat England 5–2 to enter the final.

Indonesia clashed with Japan for a third consecutive time in the final. 7 matches were played: 3 singles and 4 doubles (2 doubles, then reversed). Indonesia made history by winning their first ever Uber Cup after defeating Japan 5–2 in the final.

=== Bracket ===
First round
Japan
Bye
31 May 1975 – Jakarta
Canada	4
Australia	3
1 June 1975 – Jakarta
Malaysia	0
Indonesia	7
Bye
England

Second round
2 June 1975 – Jakarta
Japan	6
Canada	1
4 June 1975 – Jakarta
Indonesia	5
England	2

Challenge round
6 June 1975 – Jakarta
Japan	2
Indonesia	5

=== First round ===
31 May 1975

Canada	4–3	Australia
Report

Istora Senayan, Indonesia

1 June 1975

Indonesia	7–0	Malaysia
Report

Istora Senayan, Indonesia

=== Second round ===
2 June 1975

Japan	6–1	Canada
Report

Istora Senayan, Indonesia

4 June 1975

Indonesia	5–2	England
Report

Istora Senayan, Indonesia

=== Challenge round ===
6 June 1975

Japan	2–5	Indonesia
Report

Istora Senayan, Indonesia

1975 Uber Cup winner

Indonesia
First title
