= Badminton New Zealand =

National sports association

Badminton New Zealand is the badminton organisation in New Zealand which was established in 1927 under the stewardship of Archdeacon Ralph Creed Meredith of Whanganui, one of its first champions, and became a founding member of Badminton World Federation (then known as International Badminton Federation) in 1934. It was incorporated on 26 May 1938 and responsible for promotion and development of badminton in New Zealand. Badminton New Zealand has 27 regional member associations and also organises the New Zealand Open badminton tournament.

In 2005 in an attempt to attract publicity (and thus sponsorship, players and fans), Badminton New Zealand chose Black Cocks as a nickname for their national teams, a reference to the sport's shuttlecock and the custom of naming teams in reference to the All Blacks New Zealand's national rugby union team. Badminton New Zealand did get more publicity, and there was sponsorship interest from condom companies. Following objections at a board meeting, the name was not adopted for formal use.
