= Utami Kinard =

Indonesian badminton player

Utami Dewi Kinard
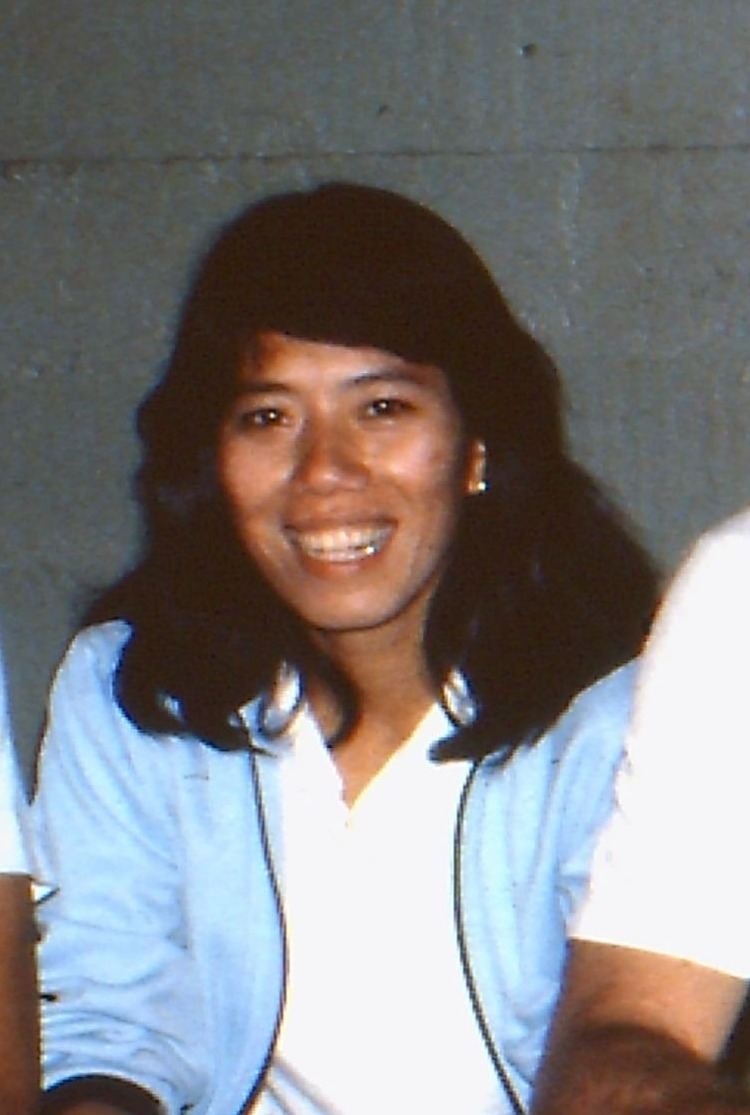

Personal information
- Born: Utami Dewi; 16 June 1951 (age 75) Surabaya, East Java, Indonesia

Sport
- Country: United States
- Sport: Badminton
- Handedness: Right
Medal record
Women's badminton
Representing Indonesia
Uber Cup
Gold medal – first place	1975 Jakarta	Women's team
Silver medal – second place	1969 Tokyo	Women's team
Silver medal – second place	1972 Tokyo	Women's team
Asian Games
Bronze medal – third place	1970 Bangkok	Women's team
Asian Championships
Gold medal – first place	1971 Jakarta	Women's singles

Utami Dewi Kinard (born 16 June 1951) is a former world-class badminton player who was considered Indonesia's #1 women's singles player in the 1970s, and became the United States' #1 player in 1981, after marrying former 6 time U.S. men's singles champion, Chris Kinard. She is also the sister of 8 time All-England singles champion, Rudy Hartono.

== Early life ==
Utami Dewi was born in Surabaya in 1951. She is the sister of 8 time All England singles champion, Rudy Hartono. She initially pursued running, and in the 1967 PASI championship at the Senayan Jakarta, Dewi won the women's 800 meter running event. She graduated from the Vocational Education Institute of Tarakanita in 1974.

== Career ==
Utami Dewi was the number 1 Indonesian women's singles player from 1971 to 1975. She played singles for the Indonesian Uber Cup teams of 1969, 1972, and 1975 (competitions then held every 3 years). The 1975 team was Indonesia's first to win the Women's World Team Championship. She was the second Indonesian player to reached the women's singles semi finals at the All England Open in 1975. As Mrs. Utami Kinard she ended her career as the #1 U.S. women's singles player in 1981 representing the U.S. as the #1 player on the 1981 U.S. Uber Cup team.

Along with her Indonesian and U.S. titles, Utami Dewi won the Asian singles championship in 1971, the Australian Open singles champion in 1975, the Mexican Open women's singles and mixed doubles Champion in 1979, and the South African singles champion in 1980.

== Additional badminton career highlights ==
1972 - Munich Olympics - Won the Silver medal in badminton women's singles (badminton was a demonstration sport).

1975 - All-England Badminton Championship -Reached the semi-finals of the women's singles.

Represented either Indonesia, or the U.S., or both internationally in the following countries: Australia, Canada, Denmark, England, Germany, Hong Kong, Japan, Mexico, New Zealand, Peru, Scotland, Singapore, South Africa, South Korea, Sweden, Taiwan, Thailand.

== Awards in badminton ==
In 1981, she was in Sports Illustrated's "Faces in the Crowd".

== Achievements ==
=== Olympic Games (demonstration) ===
Women's singles
Year	Venue	Opponent	Score	Result	Ref.
1972	Volleyballhalle, Munich, West Germany	(Japan) Noriko Nakayama	5–11, 3–11	Silver	

Mixed doubles
Year	Venue	Partner	Opponent	Score	Result	Ref.
1972	Volleyballhalle, Munich, West Germany	(Indonesia) Christian Hadinata	(Denmark) Svend Pri (Denmark) Ulla Strand	12–15, 10–15	Bronze	

=== Asian Championships ===
Women's singles
Year	Venue	Opponent	Score	Result	Ref.
1971	Istora Senayan, Jakarta, Indonesia	(South Korea) Yoon Im-soon	11–5, 11–5	Gold	

=== International tournaments ===
Women's singles
Year	Tournament	Opponent	Score	Result	Ref.
1970	Singapore Open	(Indonesia) Intan Nurtjahja	3–11, 5–11	(silver) Runner-up	
1975	Silver Bowl International	(Indonesia) Taty Sumirah	6–11, 11–8, 11–5	(gold) Winner	
1979	Mexican Open	(Mexico) Susana Vargas	11–8, 11–3	(gold) Winner	
1980	South African Championships	(South Africa) Gussie Phillips	10–12, 11–7, 11–3	(gold) Winner	

Women's doubles
Year	Tournament	Partner	Opponent	Score	Result	Ref.
1980	South African Championships	(United States) Judianne Kelly	(South Africa) Gussie Phillips (South Africa) Marianne Abrahams	11–15, 15–12, 3–15	(silver) Runner-up	
