= Richard Purser =

New Zealand badminton player

Personal information
- Born: Richard Howard Purser; 28 February 1942 (age 84) New Plymouth, New Zealand

Sport
- Country: New Zealand
- Sport: Badminton
- Career title: 33 times National champion
Medal record
Men's badminton
Representing New Zealand
Commonwealth Games
Bronze medal – third place	1978 Edmonton	Men's doubles

Richard Howard Purser (born 28 February 1942) is a New Zealand badminton player who has won 33 New Zealand national badminton titles, including the men's singles on nine occasions. He competed at four consecutive Commonwealth Games, from 1966 to 1978, and won the bronze medal in the men's doubles with his brother, Bryan Purser, at the 1978 Commonwealth Games.

== Early life and family ==
Purser was born in New Plymouth on 28 February 1942, the son of Betty Purser (née Cochran) and Howard Musgrave Purser. He was educated at New Plymouth Boys' High School, where he excelled at tennis and badminton.

Purser's brother, Bryan, and nephew, Craig Cooper, have also represented New Zealand in badminton. His nephew, Mark Purser, is a golfer who represented New Zealand in the Eisenhower Trophy before turning professional.

== Badminton ==
Purser won national junior badminton titles in 1958 and 1959. He won the first of his 33 senior New Zealand national badminton championship titles in 1962, that year winning the men's singles and mixed doubles, with Margaret Moorhead. Purser went on to win the New Zealand men's singles title nine times.

In February 1970, Purser was named the Taranaki sportsman of the year.

Purser represented New Zealand at four Commonwealth Games between 1966 and 1978. At the 1966 British Empire and Commonwealth Games in Kingston, he lost his opening matches in the men's singles, men's doubles and mixed doubles. Four years later, at the 1970 British Commonwealth Games in Edinburgh, he fared better, reaching the quarter-finals of the men's singles before losing to the eventual gold medalist, Jamie Paulson from Canada. In both the men's doubles and mixed doubles, he was eliminated in the round of 16. In 1974, at the British Commonwealth Games in Christchurch, Purser was again defeated by Jamie Paulson in the quarter-finals. In the men's doubles, partnering his brother Bryan, he was eliminated in the round of 16, while in the mixed doubles he and partner Alison Branfield finished fourth, losing the bronze medal play-off to the English combination of Susan Whetnall and Elliot Stuart. At his final Commonwealth Games, in 1978 at Edmonton, Purser reached the quarter-finals of the men's singles, again finished fourth in the mixed doubles with Alison Branfield, and won the bronze medal with his brother Bryan in the men's doubles. In the mixed teams event, Purser was a part of the New Zealand team that finished fourth, losing to Malaysia in the play-off for the bronze medal.

In 2003, after running summer badminton training camps in Austria for 14 years, Purser returned to New Zealand and competed in the men's doubles, paired with Phil Horne, at the North Harbour Open. In 2007, Purser, then aged 65, and Horne competed at the New Zealand Open, reaching the round of 16.

== Squash ==
Purser began playing squash in New Plymouth as part of his training for badminton. He went on to represent New Zealand at masters level. At the 2001 World Masters Squash Championships in Melbourne, Purser won the men's 55–59 age group title. In 2009, he won the men's 65–69 category at the World Masters Squash Championships, held in Christchurch.
