= Bryan Purser =

New Zealand badminton player

Personal information
- Born: Bryan Russell Purser; 1950 or 1951 (age 75–76)

Sport
- Country: New Zealand
- Sport: Badminton
Medal record
Men's badminton
Representing New Zealand
Commonwealth Games
Bronze medal – third place	1978 Edmonton	Men's doubles

Bryan Russell Purser (born 1950 or 1951) is a New Zealand badminton player. He competed at two Commonwealth Games, in 1974 and 1978, and won the bronze medal in the men's doubles with his brother, Richard Purser, at the 1978 Commonwealth Games.

== Early life and family ==
Born in about 1950, Purser is the son of Betty Purser (née Cochran) and Howard Musgrave Purser, and the brother of Richard Purser. He was educated at New Plymouth Boys' High School, where he was a house prefect and active in sports. He was vice-captain of the cricket 1st XI in 1968, and was prominent as a badminton and tennis player.

Purser's son, Mark Purser, is a golfer who represented New Zealand in the Eisenhower Trophy before turning professional. His nephew, Craig Cooper, has represented New Zealand in badminton.

== Badminton ==
Purser won national junior badminton titles in singles, doubles and mixed doubles in 1967.

Purser represented New Zealand at two Commonwealth Games, in 1974 and 1978. At the 1974 British Commonwealth Games in Christchurch, Purser was eliminated in the round of 16 in each of the men's singles, men's doubles (partnering his brother Richard), and mixed doubles (with Robin Denton). At the 1978 Commonwealth Games at Edmonton, Purser was eliminated in the second round of the men's singles, reached the round of 16 in the mixed doubles with Allison Sinton, and won the bronze medal with his brother Richard in the men's doubles. In the mixed teams event, Purser was a part of the New Zealand team that finished fourth, losing to Malaysia in the play-off for the bronze medal.

== Later life ==
After playing badminton in Europe for several seasons, Purser returned to New Zealand, and with his sister and brother-in-law, Judy and Ray Cooper, bought the franchise for Cowell's Genuine Pavlovas in Hamilton, in 1981. They grew the business, from initially baking 224 pavlovas a day, to a similar number per hour in 2001.
