= 1960 Uber Cup =

Tournament details
- Dates: 4 – 9 April 1960
- Edition: 2nd
- Level: International
- Nations: 5
- Location: Baltimore, United States; Boston, United States; New Haven, United States; Philadelphia, United States

The 1960 Uber Cup, held during the 1959-1960 badminton season, was the second edition of the women's international badminton championship. The ties (sets of matches) between zone winning nations took place in April 1960. Having won the previous tournament in 1957, the United States hosted the final round in Philadelphia.

In a repeat of the 1957 Uber Cup final, the United States were victorious over Denmark with Judy Devlin again victorious in all three of her matches.

== Qualification ==
Four teams qualified for the interzone stage of the competition, India, New Zealand and Denmark. The United States were exempted until the challenge round.

Means of qualification	Date	Venue	Slot	Qualified teams
1957 Uber Cup	13 – 18 March 1957	Eastbourne; Lytham St Annes	1	United States
Asian Zone	5 September – 3 December 1959	Jamshedpur; Singapore	1	India
American Zone	–	–	1	Canada
European Zone	4 December 1959 – 25 February 1960	Copenhagen; Dublin; Edinburgh	1	Denmark
Australasian Zone	29 June – 26 September 1959	Dunedin; Melbourne; Wellington	1	New Zealand
Total			5	

== Knockout stage ==
The United States team, winners of the 1960 Uber Cup.

The following four teams, shown by region, qualified for the 1960 Uber Cup. In the first round, New Zealand narrowly defeated Canada 4–3 while Denmark defeated India 6–1. Denmark then defeated New Zealand 7–0. The United States and Denmark once again clashed in the final. 7 matches were played: 3 singles and 4 doubles (2 doubles, then reversed). The United States retained the Uber Cup after defeating the Denmark 5–2.

=== Bracket ===
First round
United States
Bye
5 April 1960 – Boston
Canada	3
New Zealand	4
4 April 1960 – New Haven
India	1
Denmark	6

Second round
United States
Bye
7 April 1960 – Baltimore
New Zealand	0
Denmark	7

Challenge round
9 April 1960 – Philadelphia
United States	5
Denmark	2

=== First round ===
4 April 1960

Denmark	6–1	India
Report

New Haven, United States

5 April 1960

New Zealand	4–3	Canada
Report

Boston, United States

=== Second round ===
7 April 1960

Denmark	7–0	New Zealand
Report

Baltimore, United States

=== Challenge round ===
9 April 1960

United States	5–2	Denmark
Report

Philadelphia, United States

1960 Uber Cup winner

United States
Second title
