= Volleyballhalle =

Indoor arena in Munich, Germany

Coordinates: 48.1333°N 11.5667°E

Volleyballhalle is an indoor arena located in Munich, Germany. It hosted the volleyball competitions for the 1972 Summer Olympics in Munich.

The hall has an area of 5132 square meters and included a restaurant, restrooms, and changing area.
