= Intan Nurtjahja =

Indonesian badminton player

Personal information
Medal record
Women's badminton
Representing Indonesia
Uber Cup
Silver medal – second place	1972 Tokyo	Women's team
Asian Championships
Gold medal – first place	1971 Jakarta	Women's doubles
Silver medal – second place	1971 Jakarta	Mixed doubles

Intan Nurtjahja born 1947, is an Indonesian badminton player in the 70s.

== Profile ==
Nurtjahja competed at the 1971 Asian Championships, winning the women's doubles gold medal with Retno Koestijah and a silver medal in the mixed doubles with Indra Gunawan. In 1972 Uber Cup, she participated in the women's world championships and was awarded a silver medal.

== Achievements ==
=== Asian Championships ===
Women's doubles

Year	Venue	Partner	Opponent	Score	Result
1971	Istora Senayan, Jakarta, Indonesia	(Indonesia) Retno Kustijah	(Indonesia) Regina Masli (Indonesia) Poppy Tumengkol	15–13, 15-6	Gold

Mixed doubles

Year	Venue	Partner	Opponent	Score	Result
1971	Istora Senayan, Jakarta, Indonesia	(Indonesia) Indra Gunawan	(Indonesia) Christian Hadinata (Indonesia) Retno Kustijah	13–18, 5-15	Silver

=== International tournaments (3 titles) ===
Women's singles

Year	Tournament	Opponent	Score	Result
1970	Singapore Open	(Indonesia) Utami Dewi	11–3, 11–5	(gold) Winner
1972	Singapore Open	(Indonesia) Taty Sumirah	11–8, 12–11	(gold) Winner

Women's doubles

Year	Tournament	Partner	Opponent	Score	Result
1972	Singapore Open	(Indonesia) Regina Masli	(Indonesia) Taty Sumirah (Indonesia) Poppy Tumengkol	15–4, 10–15, 15–10	(gold) Winner
