= Heather Robson =

New Zealand sportsperson (1928–2019)

Heather Robson MNZM
Personal information
- Born: Heather Jean Redwood; 6 May 1928 Auckland, New Zealand
- Died: 11 October 2019 (aged 91) Auckland, New Zealand
- Spouse: Jeff Robson (m. 1953)

Sport
- Country: New Zealand
- Sport: Tennis, badminton

Heather Jean Robson MNZM (née Redwood; 6 May 1928 – 11 October 2019) was a New Zealand badminton and tennis player.

== Early life and family ==
Born on 6 May 1928 in Auckland, to Effie Redwood (née McLachlan) and John Addis Redwood, Robson was educated at St Cuthbert's College. Her father was president of the New Zealand Rugby League in the 1930s and 1940s. In 1953, she married Jeffrey Ellis Robson, who also played international badminton for New Zealand. The couple went on to have one child.

== Sporting career ==
=== Tennis ===
In tennis Robson won both the New Zealand women's doubles and mixed doubles titles. She competed at Wimbledon twice, in 1954 and 1957. In 1954 she reached the third round of the singles, third round of the doubles (playing with Judy Burke), and third round of the mixed doubles (with her husband Jeff). Three years later she progressed to the second round of the singles, quarter-finals of the doubles (with Ruia Morrison), and fourth round of the mixed doubles (again with husband Jeff).

=== Badminton ===
As a badminton player Robson won seven New Zealand singles championships, and also won nine national women's doubles and three mixed doubles titles, playing with her husband. In 1954 she reached the semi-finals of the singles at All England Badminton Championships and won the Irish singles title.

=== Administration ===
At various times, Robson served as president of Auckland Tennis, Auckland Badminton, Badminton New Zealand. and Badminton Oceania.

== Honours and awards ==
In 1988 Robson received a meritorious service award from the Badminton World Federation. She was appointed a Member of the New Zealand Order of Merit, for services to racquet sports, in the 2001 New Year Honours. In 2013 the Badminton World Federation presented Robson with its lifetime achievement award.

== Death ==
Robson died in Auckland on 11 October 2019. Her husband, Jeff Robson, died in 2022.
