= Sonia Cox =

New Zealand badminton and tennis player (1936–2001)

Sonia Hilda Cox (25 December 1936 – 23 August 2001) was a New Zealand badminton and tennis player.

Cox began playing badminton at age 11. She attended Otago Girls' High School, where she continued to play badminton. When she was 14, she started to play in the Otago provincial team and she was placed eighth in the national rankings. In 1953, at age 16, she was part of the New Zealand badminton team which travelled to Tasmania, for a tour of competitions.

Cox held the national title in women's badminton six times: 1953 to 1957 and again in 1960. In 1960, she was part of a New Zealand women's team which competed in the Uber Cup in the United States and progressed to the finals of the tournament.

Cox played tennis competitively as well, including in the national tournaments in 1955 and 1956, and at The Championships, Wimbledon in 1958. At Wimbledon she competed in the ladies' singles, in the ladies' doubles with Ruia Morrison and in the mixed doubles with Peter Nicholls.
