= Taty Sumirah =

Indonesian badminton player (1952–2020)

Personal information
- Born: 9 February 1952 Jakarta, Indonesia
- Died: 13 February 2020 (aged 68)

Sport
- Country: Indonesia
- Sport: Badminton
Medal record
Women's badminton
Representing Indonesia
World Championships
Bronze medal – third place	1980 Jakarta	Women's singles
Uber Cup
Gold medal – first place	1975 Jakarta	Women's team
Silver medal – second place	1972 Tokyo	Women's team
Silver medal – second place	1981 Tokyo	Women's team
Asian Games
Silver medal – second place	1974 Tehran	Women's team
Asian Championships
Bronze medal – third place	1971 Jakarta	Women's singles

Taty Sumirah (9 February 1952 – 13 February 2020) was a badminton player of Indonesia.

== Career ==
Sumirah started her career by following the Asian Championships 1971 in Jakarta, she won a bronze medal after being defeated by Utami Dewi and get another bronze medal at the 1980 IBF World Championships after being defeated by Verawaty Wiharjo in women's singles. Sumirah was a member of several Indonesian Uber Cup (women's international) teams, helping the 1975 team to win the world championship.

== Achievements ==
=== World Championships ===
Women's singles

Year	Venue	Opponent	Score	Result
1980	Istora Gelora Bung Karno, Jakarta, Indonesia	(Indonesia) Verawaty Wiharjo	4–11, 11–8, 3–11	Bronze

=== Asian Championships ===
Women's singles

Year	Venue	Opponent	Score	Result
1971	Jakarta, Indonesia	(Malaysia) Sylvia Ng	11–8, 11–5	Bronze

=== International tournaments ===
Women's singles

Year	Tournament	Opponent	Score	Result
1972	Singapore Open	(Indonesia) Intan Nurtjahja	8–11, 11–12	(silver) Runner-up
1975	Silver Bowl International	(Indonesia) Utami Kinard	11–6, 8–11, 5–11	(silver) Runner-up

Women's doubles

Year	Tournament	Partner	Opponent	Score	Result
1972	Singapore Open	(Indonesia) Poppy Tumengkol	(Indonesia) Intan Nurtjahja (Indonesia) Regina Masli	4–15, 15–10, 10–15	(silver) Runner-up

=== Invitational tournaments ===
Women's singles

Year	Tournament	Opponent	Score	Result
1974 (Jakarta)	World Invitational Championships	(England) Margaret Beck	1–11, 6–11	Silver
1975	World Invitational Championships	(Japan) Hiroe Yuki	8–11, 7–11	Silver
