= Robin Denton =

New Zealand badminton player

Personal information
- Birth name: Robin Lesley Glenie
- Country: New Zealand
- Born: 1950 (age 74–75)
Medal record
Women's badminton
Representing New Zealand
Commonwealth Games
Bronze medal – third place	1982 Brisbane	Mixed doubles

Robin Lesley Denton (née Glenie; born 1950) is a New Zealand badminton player. She competed at three Commonwealth Games between 1970 and 1982, and won the bronze medal in the mixed doubles with Steve Wilson at the 1982 Commonwealth Games.

== Early life and family ==
Denton was born Robin Lesley Glenie in 1950, one of five children of Gwen Gibson Glenie (née Gardner) and Jack Patrick Glenie. Her siblings include Alison Glenie, who was also a New Zealand badminton representative. She was educated at St Cuthbert's College, Auckland.

She became a schoolteacher and married international badminton umpire Robert Denton, also a teacher.

== Badminton ==
Denton represented New Zealand in badminton at three Commonwealth Games: in 1970, 1974 and 1982.

At the 1970 British Commonwealth Games in Edinburgh, competing as Robin Glenie, she lost her respective opening matches in the women's singles and women's doubles (with her sister Alison Glenie). In the mixed doubles, with John Compton, she won her first match before being eliminated in the round of 16.

In 1974, competing under her married name at the British Commonwealth Games in Christchurch, she was again defeated in the first round of the women's singles. In the women's doubles, partnering her sister Alison, she won her first round match before being eliminated in the quarter-finals by the Malaysian pair of Rosalind Singha Ang and Sylvia Ng. In the mixed doubles she and partner Bryan Purser won their first-round match, before losing in the round of 16.

At her final Commonwealth Games, in 1982 at Brisbane, Denton lost in the first round of the women's singles. With Toni Whittaker she reached the quarter-finals of the women's doubles, and she won the bronze medal with Steve Wilson in the mixed doubles. In the mixed teams event, Denton was a part of the New Zealand team that finished fourth, losing to Malaysia in the play-off for the bronze medal.
