= 1972 Uber Cup =

1972 Uber Cup ユーバー杯1972
Tournament details
- Dates: 7 – 11 June 1972
- Edition: 6th
- Level: International
- Nations: 5
- Venue: Tokyo Metropolitan Gymnasium
- Location: Tokyo, Japan

The 1972 Uber Cup was the sixth edition of the Uber Cup, the women's badminton team competition. The tournament took place in the 1971–1972 badminton season, 17 countries competed. Japan won its third title in the Uber Cup, after beating the Indonesia team 6–1 in the Final Round in Tokyo, Japan.

== Qualification ==
17 teams from 4 regions took part in the competition. As defending champion, Japan skipped the qualifications and played directly in the final round of the inter-zone ties (team matches), effectively the semifinals of the tournament.

Means of qualification	Date	Venue	Slot	Qualified teams
1969 Uber Cup	8 – 14 June 1969	Tokyo	1	Japan
Asian Zone	31 October 1971 – 25 February 1972	Jakarta	1	Indonesia
American Zone	26 February 1972	Toronto	1	Canada
European Zone	30 October 1971 – 11 March 1972	Copenhagen; Hørsholm; Paisley; Scunthorpe	1	Denmark
Australasian Zone	27 July 1971	Wellington	1	New Zealand
Total			5	

From the qualifying rounds, four countries progressed to the inter-zone ties. From the Australasian zone, New Zealand advanced to the next round after beating Australia 4–3. From the Asian zone the Indonesia team advanced to the inter-zone ties with a walkover against Thailand. In the European zone final Denmark defeated England 5–2. From the Pan American zone, Canada beat the United States 6–1.

== Knockout stage ==
The following four teams, shown by region, qualified for the 1972 Uber Cup. In the first round, Indonesia defeated Canada 7–0. The second round saw defending champions and hosts Japan defeat Denmark 7–0. In the other tie, Indonesia beat New Zealand 7–0. Indonesia once again clashed with Japan in the final. 7 matches were played: 3 singles and 4 doubles (2 doubles, then reversed). Japan retained the title for a third time after defeating Indonesia 6–1 in the final.

=== Bracket ===
First round
New Zealand
Bye
7 June 1972 – Tokyo
Canada	0
Indonesia	7
Japan
Bye
Bye
Denmark

Second round
9 June 1972 – Tokyo
New Zealand	0
Indonesia	7
8 June 1972 – Tokyo
Japan	7
Denmark	0

Challenge round
11 June 1972 – Tokyo
Indonesia	1
Japan	6

=== First round ===
7 June 1972

Indonesia	7–0	Canada
Report

Tokyo Metropolitan Gymnasium, Japan

=== Second round ===
8 June 1972

Japan	7–0	Denmark
Report

Tokyo Metropolitan Gymnasium, Japan

9 June 1972

Indonesia	7–0	New Zealand
Report

Tokyo Metropolitan Gymnasium, Japan

=== Challenge round ===
11 June 1972

Japan	6–1	Indonesia
Report

Tokyo Metropolitan Gymnasium, Japan

1972 Uber Cup winner

Japan
Third title
