= Medalists at the Badminton Asia Championships – Women's doubles =

Badminton championships

Badminton Asia Championships Women's Doubles Champions
- Governing body: Badminton Asia
- Created: 1962; 64 years ago
- Editions: 40
- Website: https://badmintonasia.org/

Most titles
- 4: (China) Ge Fei (China) Gu Jun

Current champion
- (China) Li Yijing (China) Luo Xumin (2026)

The Asian Badminton Championships is a tournament organized by the Badminton Asia Confederation to crown the best badminton players in Asia. There were two championships in 1976, one of them was unofficial/invitational. Further editions of Invitation Asian championships were held in 1977, 1978 and 1988. The Women's doubles event has been conducted in each of the editions of this tournament. Below is the list of the women's doubles medalists at the Badminton Asia Championships since 1962.

Year	Host City	Gold	Silver	Bronze
1962	Kuala Lumpur	(Indonesia) Happy Herowati (Indonesia) Corry Kawilarang	(Thailand) Sumol Chanklum (Thailand) Pankae Phongarn	(Indonesia) Wiwiek Dwi Kaeksi (Indonesia) Minarni
1962	Kuala Lumpur	(Indonesia) Happy Herowati (Indonesia) Corry Kawilarang	(Thailand) Sumol Chanklum (Thailand) Pankae Phongarn	(Federation of Malaya) Jean Moey (Federation of Malaya) Ng Mei Ling
1965	Lucknow	(England) Angela Bairstow (England) Ursula Smith	(Malaysia) Rosalind Singha Ang (Malaysia) Teoh Siew Yong	(Thailand) Sumol Chanklum (Thailand) Boopha Kaenthong
1965	Lucknow	(England) Angela Bairstow (England) Ursula Smith	(Malaysia) Rosalind Singha Ang (Malaysia) Teoh Siew Yong	(Sri Lanka) Lucky Dharmasena (Sri Lanka) Neelanthi Kannangara
1969	Manila	(South Korea) Kang Young-sin (South Korea) Lee Young-soon	(Hong Kong) Cynder Ho (Hong Kong) Pang Yuet Mui	(Myanmar) Khin Hyin (Myanmar) Ma Than Ngwe
1969	Manila	(South Korea) Kang Young-sin (South Korea) Lee Young-soon	(Hong Kong) Cynder Ho (Hong Kong) Pang Yuet Mui	(Philippines) Lily Tan (Philippines) Mary Tan
1971	Jakarta	(Indonesia) Retno Kustijah (Indonesia) Intan Nurtjahja	(Indonesia) Regina Masli (Indonesia) Poppy Tumengkol	(South Korea) Kim Jong-ja (South Korea) Yoon Im-soon
1976	Hyderabad	(Indonesia) Regina Masli (Indonesia) Theresia Widiastuti	(China) He Cuiling (China) Liang Qiuxia	(China) Liu Xia (China) Zhang Ailing
1976	Hyderabad	(Indonesia) Regina Masli (Indonesia) Theresia Widiastuti	(China) He Cuiling (China) Liang Qiuxia	(Indonesia) Holly Tanjung (Indonesia) Verawaty Wiharjo
1983	Calcutta	(China) Fan Ming (China) Guan Weizhen	(South Korea) Kim Bok-sun (South Korea) Park Hyun-suk	(South Korea) Chung Myung-hee (South Korea) Yoo Sang-hee
1983	Calcutta	(China) Fan Ming (China) Guan Weizhen	(South Korea) Kim Bok-sun (South Korea) Park Hyun-suk	(China) Lu Qing (China) Song Youping
1985	Kuala Lumpur	(South Korea) Kim Yun-ja (South Korea) Yoo Sang-hee	(South Korea) Chung So-young (South Korea) Hwang Hye-young	(China) Qian Ping (China) Zheng Yuli
1991	Kuala Lumpur	(South Korea) Chung So-young (South Korea) Hwang Hye-young	(South Korea) Gil Young-ah (South Korea) Shim Eun-jung	(China) Liu Yuhong (China) Wu Wenjing
1991	Kuala Lumpur	(South Korea) Chung So-young (South Korea) Hwang Hye-young	(South Korea) Gil Young-ah (South Korea) Shim Eun-jung	(China) Pan Li (China) Wu Yuhong
1992	Kuala Lumpur	(China) Pan Li (China) Wu Yuhong	(Thailand) Ladawan Mulasartsatorn (Thailand) Piyathip Sansaniyakulvilai	(Japan) Yoshiko Iwata (Japan) Fujimi Tamura
1992	Kuala Lumpur	(China) Pan Li (China) Wu Yuhong	(Thailand) Ladawan Mulasartsatorn (Thailand) Piyathip Sansaniyakulvilai	(Malaysia) Tan Lee Wai (Malaysia) Tan Sui Hoon
1994	Shanghai	(China) Ge Fei (China) Gu Jun	(China) Chen Ying (China) Wu Yuhong	(South Korea) Jang Hye-ock (South Korea) Shim Eun-jung
1994	Shanghai	(China) Ge Fei (China) Gu Jun	(China) Chen Ying (China) Wu Yuhong	(China) Peng Xingyong (China) Zhang Jin
1995	Beijing	(China) Ge Fei (China) Gu Jun	(China) Qin Yiyuan (China) Tang Yongshu	(Indonesia) Eliza Nathanael (Indonesia) Zelin Resiana
1995	Beijing	(China) Ge Fei (China) Gu Jun	(China) Qin Yiyuan (China) Tang Yongshu	(China) Peng Xingyong (China) Zhang Jin
1996	Surabaya	(Indonesia) Finarsih (Indonesia) Eliza Nathanael	(Indonesia) Indarti Issolina (Indonesia) Deyana Lomban	(South Korea) Chung Jae-hee (South Korea) Park Soo-yun
1996	Surabaya	(Indonesia) Finarsih (Indonesia) Eliza Nathanael	(Indonesia) Indarti Issolina (Indonesia) Deyana Lomban	(Japan) Hisako Mizui (Japan) Yasuko Mizui
1997	Kuala Lumpur	(China) Huang Nanyan (China) Liu Zhong	(China) Liu Lu (China) Qian Hong	(Chinese Taipei) Chen Li-chin (Chinese Taipei) Tsai Hui-min
1997	Kuala Lumpur	(China) Huang Nanyan (China) Liu Zhong	(China) Liu Lu (China) Qian Hong	(Indonesia) Etty Tantri (Indonesia) Cynthia Tuwankotta
1998	Bangkok	(China) Ge Fei (China) Gu Jun	(China) Qin Yiyuan (China) Tang Hetian	(South Korea) Chung Jae-hee (South Korea) Yim Kyung-jin
1998	Bangkok	(China) Ge Fei (China) Gu Jun	(China) Qin Yiyuan (China) Tang Hetian	(Indonesia) Deyana Lomban (Indonesia) Eliza Nathanael
1999	Kuala Lumpur	(China) Ge Fei (China) Gu Jun	(South Korea) Chung Jae-hee (South Korea) Ra Kyung-min	(Thailand) Sujitra Ekmongkolpaisarn (Thailand) Saralee Thungthongkam
1999	Kuala Lumpur	(China) Ge Fei (China) Gu Jun	(South Korea) Chung Jae-hee (South Korea) Ra Kyung-min	(Indonesia) Etty Tantri (Indonesia) Cynthia Tuwankotta
2000	Jakarta	(South Korea) Lee Hyo-jung (South Korea) Yim Kyung-jin	(Indonesia) Etty Tantri (Indonesia) Minarti Timur	(South Korea) Chung Jae-hee (South Korea) Lee Kyung-won
2000	Jakarta	(South Korea) Lee Hyo-jung (South Korea) Yim Kyung-jin	(Indonesia) Etty Tantri (Indonesia) Minarti Timur	(Indonesia) Diah Novita (Indonesia) Rosie Riani
2001	Manila	(China) Gao Ling (China) Huang Sui	(Indonesia) Deyana Lomban (Indonesia) Vita Marissa	(Indonesia) Eny Erlangga (Indonesia) Jo Novita
2001	Manila	(China) Gao Ling (China) Huang Sui	(Indonesia) Deyana Lomban (Indonesia) Vita Marissa	(China) Zhang Yawen (China) Zhao Tingting
2002	Bangkok	(China) Yang Wei (China) Zhang Jiewen	(China) Gao Ling (China) Huang Sui	(Thailand) Sathinee Chankrachangwong (Thailand) Saralee Thungthongkam
2002	Bangkok	(China) Yang Wei (China) Zhang Jiewen	(China) Gao Ling (China) Huang Sui	(China) Wei Yili (China) Zhao Tingting
2003	Jakarta	(South Korea) Lee Kyung-won (South Korea) Ra Kyung-min	(South Korea) Hwang Yu-mi (South Korea) Lee Hyo-jung	(Japan) Aki Akao (Japan) Tomomi Matsuda
2003	Jakarta	(South Korea) Lee Kyung-won (South Korea) Ra Kyung-min	(South Korea) Hwang Yu-mi (South Korea) Lee Hyo-jung	(Indonesia) Jo Novita (Indonesia) Lita Nurlita
2004	Kuala Lumpur	(South Korea) Lee Hyo-jung (South Korea) Lee Kyung-won	(China) Du Jing (China) Yu Yang	(Thailand) Sathinee Chankrachangwong (Thailand) Saralee Thungthongkam
2004	Kuala Lumpur	(South Korea) Lee Hyo-jung (South Korea) Lee Kyung-won	(China) Du Jing (China) Yu Yang	(Malaysia) Chin Eei Hui (Malaysia) Wong Pei Tty
2005	Hyderabad	(South Korea) Lee Hyo-jung (South Korea) Lee Kyung-won	(Japan) Kumiko Ogura (Japan) Reiko Shiota	(Indonesia) Jo Novita (Indonesia) Greysia Polii
2005	Hyderabad	(South Korea) Lee Hyo-jung (South Korea) Lee Kyung-won	(Japan) Kumiko Ogura (Japan) Reiko Shiota	(Indonesia) Lita Nurlita (Indonesia) Natalia Christine Poluakan
2006	Johor Bahru	(China) Du Jing (China) Yu Yang	(Chinese Taipei) Cheng Wen-hsing (Chinese Taipei) Chien Yu-chin	(Malaysia) Lim Pek Siah (Malaysia) Joanne Quay
2006	Johor Bahru	(China) Du Jing (China) Yu Yang	(Chinese Taipei) Cheng Wen-hsing (Chinese Taipei) Chien Yu-chin	(China) Pan Pan (China) Tian Qing
2007	Johor Bahru	(China) Yang Wei (China) Zhao Tingting	(China) Cheng Shu (China) Zhao Yunlei	(Thailand) Duanganong Aroonkesorn (Thailand) Kunchala Voravichitchaikul
2007	Johor Bahru	(China) Yang Wei (China) Zhao Tingting	(China) Cheng Shu (China) Zhao Yunlei	(Japan) Kumiko Ogura (Japan) Reiko Shiota
2008	Johor Bahru	(China) Yang Wei (China) Zhang Jiewen	(Chinese Taipei) Cheng Wen-hsing (Chinese Taipei) Chien Yu-chin	(South Korea) Lee Hyo-jung (South Korea) Lee Kyung-won
2008	Johor Bahru	(China) Yang Wei (China) Zhang Jiewen	(Chinese Taipei) Cheng Wen-hsing (Chinese Taipei) Chien Yu-chin	(Indonesia) Vita Marissa (Indonesia) Liliyana Natsir
2009	Suwon	(China) Ma Jin (China) Wang Xiaoli	(South Korea) Lee Hyo-jung (South Korea) Lee Kyung-won	(Chinese Taipei) Cheng Wen-hsing (Chinese Taipei) Chien Yu-chin
2009	Suwon	(China) Ma Jin (China) Wang Xiaoli	(South Korea) Lee Hyo-jung (South Korea) Lee Kyung-won	(China) Yang Wei (China) Zhang Jiewen
2010	New Delhi	(China) Pan Pan (China) Tian Qing	(Malaysia) Vivian Hoo Kah Mun (Malaysia) Woon Khe Wei	(Thailand) Savitree Amitrapai (Thailand) Vacharaporn Munkit
2010	New Delhi	(China) Pan Pan (China) Tian Qing	(Malaysia) Vivian Hoo Kah Mun (Malaysia) Woon Khe Wei	(Chinese Taipei) Cheng Wen-hsing (Chinese Taipei) Chien Yu-chin
2011	Chengdu	(China) Wang Xiaoli (China) Yu Yang	(China) Tian Qing (China) Zhao Yunlei	(China) Bao Yixin (China) Zhong Qianxin
2011	Chengdu	(China) Wang Xiaoli (China) Yu Yang	(China) Tian Qing (China) Zhao Yunlei	(South Korea) Ha Jung-eun (South Korea) Kim Min-jung
2012	Qingdao	(China) Tian Qing (China) Zhao Yunlei	(China) Bao Yixin (China) Zhong Qianxin	(China) Cheng Shu (China) Pan Pan
2012	Qingdao	(China) Tian Qing (China) Zhao Yunlei	(China) Bao Yixin (China) Zhong Qianxin	(Japan) Shizuka Matsuo (Japan) Mami Naito
2013	Taipei	(China) Wang Xiaoli (China) Yu Yang	(China) Ma Jin (China) Tang Jinhua	(South Korea) Go Ah-ra (South Korea) Yoo Chae-ran
2013	Taipei	(China) Wang Xiaoli (China) Yu Yang	(China) Ma Jin (China) Tang Jinhua	(Indonesia) Gebby Ristiyani Imawan (Indonesia) Tiara Rosalia Nuraidah
2014	Gimcheon	(China) Luo Ying (China) Luo Yu	(South Korea) Jung Kyung-eun (South Korea) Kim Ha-na	(India) Jwala Gutta (India) Ashwini Ponnappa
2014	Gimcheon	(China) Luo Ying (China) Luo Yu	(South Korea) Jung Kyung-eun (South Korea) Kim Ha-na	(China) Xia Huan (China) Zhong Qianxin
2015	Wuhan	(China) Ma Jin (China) Tang Yuanting	(China) Wang Xiaoli (China) Yu Yang	(China) Luo Ying (China) Luo Yu
2015	Wuhan	(China) Ma Jin (China) Tang Yuanting	(China) Wang Xiaoli (China) Yu Yang	(Japan) Misaki Matsutomo (Japan) Ayaka Takahashi
2016	Wuhan	(Japan) Misaki Matsutomo (Japan) Ayaka Takahashi	(Japan) Naoko Fukuman (Japan) Kurumi Yonao	(South Korea) Chang Ye-na (South Korea) Lee So-hee
2016	Wuhan	(Japan) Misaki Matsutomo (Japan) Ayaka Takahashi	(Japan) Naoko Fukuman (Japan) Kurumi Yonao	(Indonesia) Nitya Krishinda Maheswari (Indonesia) Greysia Polii
2017	Wuhan	(Japan) Misaki Matsutomo (Japan) Ayaka Takahashi	(South Korea) Kim Hye-rin (South Korea) Yoo Chae-ran	(South Korea) Chang Ye-na (South Korea) Lee So-hee
2017	Wuhan	(Japan) Misaki Matsutomo (Japan) Ayaka Takahashi	(South Korea) Kim Hye-rin (South Korea) Yoo Chae-ran	(China) Huang Dongping (China) Li Yinhui
2018	Wuhan	(Japan) Yuki Fukushima (Japan) Sayaka Hirota	(Japan) Misaki Matsutomo (Japan) Ayaka Takahashi	(Indonesia) Della Destiara Haris (Indonesia) Rizki Amelia Pradipta
2018	Wuhan	(Japan) Yuki Fukushima (Japan) Sayaka Hirota	(Japan) Misaki Matsutomo (Japan) Ayaka Takahashi	(South Korea) Kim So-yeong (South Korea) Kong Hee-yong
2019	Wuhan	(China) Chen Qingchen (China) Jia Yifan	(Japan) Mayu Matsumoto (Japan) Wakana Nagahara	(Japan) Yuki Fukushima (Japan) Sayaka Hirota
2019	Wuhan	(China) Chen Qingchen (China) Jia Yifan	(Japan) Mayu Matsumoto (Japan) Wakana Nagahara	(Indonesia) Della Destiara Haris (Indonesia) Rizki Amelia Pradipta
2022	Manila	(China) Chen Qingchen (China) Jia Yifan	(Japan) Rin Iwanaga (Japan) Kie Nakanishi	(China) Du Yue (China) Li Wenmei
2022	Manila	(China) Chen Qingchen (China) Jia Yifan	(Japan) Rin Iwanaga (Japan) Kie Nakanishi	(Japan) Yuki Fukushima (Japan) Sayaka Hirota
2023	Dubai	(Japan) Yuki Fukushima (Japan) Sayaka Hirota	(South Korea) Baek Ha-na (South Korea) Lee So-hee	(Thailand) Jongkolphan Kititharakul (Thailand) Rawinda Prajongjai
2023	Dubai	(Japan) Yuki Fukushima (Japan) Sayaka Hirota	(South Korea) Baek Ha-na (South Korea) Lee So-hee	(Japan) Mayu Matsumoto (Japan) Wakana Nagahara
2024	Ningbo	(South Korea) Baek Ha-na (South Korea) Lee So-hee	(China) Zhang Shuxian (China) Zheng Yu	(China) Chen Qingchen (China) Jia Yifan
2024	Ningbo	(South Korea) Baek Ha-na (South Korea) Lee So-hee	(China) Zhang Shuxian (China) Zheng Yu	(China) Liu Shengshu (China) Tan Ning
2025	Ningbo	(China) Liu Shengshu (China) Tan Ning	(Japan) Nami Matsuyama (Japan) Chiharu Shida	(China) Zhang Shuxian (China) Zheng Yu
2025	Ningbo	(China) Liu Shengshu (China) Tan Ning	(Japan) Nami Matsuyama (Japan) Chiharu Shida	(China) Chen Qingchen (China) Jia Yifan
2026	Ningbo	(China) Li Yijing (China) Luo Xumin	(China) Liu Shengshu (China) Tan Ning	(Indonesia) Amallia Cahaya Pratiwi (Indonesia) Siti Fadia Silva Ramadhanti
2026	Ningbo	(China) Li Yijing (China) Luo Xumin	(China) Liu Shengshu (China) Tan Ning	(Japan) Yuki Fukushima (Japan) Mayu Matsumoto

== Medal table ==
*Accurate as of 2026 Badminton Asia Championships.

Rank	Nation	Gold	Silver	Bronze	Total
1	China	23	14	21	58
2	South Korea	8	9	12	29
3	Japan	4	6	10	20
4	Indonesia	4	4	17	25
5	England	1	0	0	1
6	Thailand	0	2	7	9
7	Malaysia	0	2	4	6
8	Chinese Taipei	0	2	3	5
9	Hong Kong	0	1	0	1
10	Burma	0	0	1	1
10	India	0	0	1	1
10	Philippines	0	0	1	1
10	Sri Lanka	0	0	1	1
Totals (13 entries)		40	40	78	158

== Unofficial/Invitational Asian Badminton Championships ==
Year	Host City	Gold	Silver	Bronze
1976 (I)	Bangkok	(Malaysia) Rosalind Singha Ang (Malaysia) Sylvia Ng	(Thailand) Thongkam Kingmanee (Thailand) Sirisriro Patama	(China) Fu Chune (China) Liang Qiuxia
1977	Hong Kong	(China) Liang Qiuxia (China) Liu Xia	(Japan) Atsuko Tokuda (Japan) Mikiko Takada	(Malaysia) Rosalind Singha Ang (Malaysia) Sylvia Ng
1978	Peking	(Thailand) Thongkam Kingmanee (Thailand) Sirisriro Patama	(China) Xu Jung (China) Yu Jianghong	
1980	Bangkok	(China) Li Lingwei (China) Sang Yanquin	(Thailand) Jutatip Banjongsilp (Thailand) Suleeporn Jittariyakul	(China) Chen Ruizhen (China) Song Youping
1980	Bangkok	(China) Li Lingwei (China) Sang Yanquin	(Thailand) Jutatip Banjongsilp (Thailand) Suleeporn Jittariyakul	(Thailand) Phanwad Jinasuyanont (Thailand) Kanitta Mansamuth
1988	Bandar Lampung	(Indonesia) Verawaty Fajrin (Indonesia) Yanti Kusmiati	(South Korea) Chung Myung-hee (South Korea) Hwang Hye-young	(South Korea) Lee Heung-soon (South Korea) Lee Young-suk
1988	Bandar Lampung	(Indonesia) Verawaty Fajrin (Indonesia) Yanti Kusmiati	(South Korea) Chung Myung-hee (South Korea) Hwang Hye-young	(China) Sun Xiaoqing (China) Zhou Lei
