= Medalists at the Badminton Asia Championships – Women's singles =

Badminton championships

Badminton Asia Championships Women's Singles Champions
- Governing body: Badminton Asia
- Created: 1962; 64 years ago
- Editions: 40
- Website: https://badmintonasia.org/

Most titles
- 5: (China) Ye Zhaoying

Current champion
- (South Korea) An Se-young (2026)

The Asian Badminton Championships is a tournament organized by the Badminton Asia Confederation to crown the best badminton players in Asia. There were two championships in 1976, one of them was unofficial/invitational. Further editions of Invitation Asian championships were held in 1977, 1978 and 1988. Below is the list of the women's singles medalists at the Badminton Asia Championships since 1962.

Year	Host City	Gold	Silver	Bronze
1962	Kuala Lumpur	(Indonesia) Minarni	(Thailand) Sumol Chanklum	(Indonesia) Goei Giok Nio
1962	Kuala Lumpur	(Indonesia) Minarni	(Thailand) Sumol Chanklum	(Indonesia) Ogn Hwat Nio
1965	Lucknow	(England) Angela Bairstow	(England) Ursula Smith	(India) Sarojini Apte
1965	Lucknow	(England) Angela Bairstow	(England) Ursula Smith	(India) Meena Shah
1969	Manila	(Hong Kong) Pang Yuet Mui	(Myanmar) Ma Than Ngwe	(South Korea) Lee Young-soon
1969	Manila	(Hong Kong) Pang Yuet Mui	(Myanmar) Ma Than Ngwe	(Philippines) Mary Tan
1971	Jakarta	(Indonesia) Utami Dewi	(South Korea) Yoon Im-soon	(Indonesia) Taty Sumirah
1976	Hyderabad	(China) Liang Qiuxia	(China) Liu Xia	(Japan) Saori Kondo
1976	Hyderabad	(China) Liang Qiuxia	(China) Liu Xia	(China) Li Fang
1983	Calcutta	(South Korea) Yoo Sang-hee	(South Korea) Kim Yun-ja	(China) Fan Ming
1983	Calcutta	(South Korea) Yoo Sang-hee	(South Korea) Kim Yun-ja	(China) Guan Weizhen
1985	Kuala Lumpur	(China) Zheng Yuli	(China) Qian Ping	(China) Shi Wen
1991	Kuala Lumpur	(Indonesia) Yuliani Santosa	(South Korea) Shim Eun-jung	(China) Chen Ying
1991	Kuala Lumpur	(Indonesia) Yuliani Santosa	(South Korea) Shim Eun-jung	(South Korea) Lee Heung-soon
1992	Kuala Lumpur	(China) Ye Zhaoying	(China) Zhou Lei	(Thailand) Somharuthai Jaroensiri
1992	Kuala Lumpur	(China) Ye Zhaoying	(China) Zhou Lei	(South Korea) Ra Kyung-min
1994	Shanghai	(China) Ye Zhaoying	(China) Liu Yuhong	(South Korea) Kim Ji-hyun
1994	Shanghai	(China) Ye Zhaoying	(China) Liu Yuhong	(China) Sun Jian
1995	Beijing	(China) Ye Zhaoying	(China) Yao Yan	(South Korea) Bang Soo-hyun
1995	Beijing	(China) Ye Zhaoying	(China) Yao Yan	(China) Wang Chen
1996	Surabaya	(China) Gong Zhichao	(South Korea) Lee Joo-hyun	(Indonesia) Ika Heny
1996	Surabaya	(China) Gong Zhichao	(South Korea) Lee Joo-hyun	(Thailand) Pornsawan Plungwech
1997	Kuala Lumpur	(China) Yao Yan	(China) Yu Hua	(Indonesia) Lidya Djaelawijaya
1997	Kuala Lumpur	(China) Yao Yan	(China) Yu Hua	(China) Wu Huimin
1998	Bangkok	(China) Ye Zhaoying	(China) Gong Zhichao	(China) Dai Yun
1998	Bangkok	(China) Ye Zhaoying	(China) Gong Zhichao	(China) Gong Ruina
1999	Kuala Lumpur	(China) Ye Zhaoying	(China) Zhang Ning	(China) Dai Yun
1999	Kuala Lumpur	(China) Ye Zhaoying	(China) Zhang Ning	(China) Gong Zhichao
2000	Jakarta	(China) Xie Xingfang	(Indonesia) Ellen Angelina	(Japan) Fumi Iwawaki
2000	Jakarta	(China) Xie Xingfang	(Indonesia) Ellen Angelina	(South Korea) Lee Kyung-won
2001	Manila	(China) Zhang Ning	(Hong Kong) Wang Chen	(China) Dong Fang
2001	Manila	(China) Zhang Ning	(Hong Kong) Wang Chen	(Hong Kong) Ling Wan Ting
2002	Bangkok	(China) Zhou Mi	(China) Zhang Ning	(Hong Kong) Wang Chen
2002	Bangkok	(China) Zhou Mi	(China) Zhang Ning	(Singapore) Xiao Luxi
2003	Jakarta	(Hong Kong) Wang Chen	(Indonesia) Silvi Antarini	(China) Dai Yun
2003	Jakarta	(Hong Kong) Wang Chen	(Indonesia) Silvi Antarini	(Hong Kong) Ling Wan Ting
2004	Kuala Lumpur	(South Korea) Jun Jae-youn	(Hong Kong) Wang Chen	(Japan) Kaori Mori
2004	Kuala Lumpur	(South Korea) Jun Jae-youn	(Hong Kong) Wang Chen	(Japan) Kanako Yonekura
2005	Hyderabad	(Hong Kong) Wang Chen	(Japan) Kaori Mori	(Chinese Taipei) Cheng Shao-chieh
2005	Hyderabad	(Hong Kong) Wang Chen	(Japan) Kaori Mori	(Japan) Eriko Hirose
2006	Johor Bahru	(Hong Kong) Wang Chen	(Japan) Kaori Mori	(China) Chen Li
2006	Johor Bahru	(Hong Kong) Wang Chen	(Japan) Kaori Mori	(China) Jiang Yanjiao
2007	Johor Bahru	(China) Jiang Yanjiao	(China) Lu Lan	(Hong Kong) Wang Chen
2007	Johor Bahru	(China) Jiang Yanjiao	(China) Lu Lan	(Malaysia) Wong Mew Choo
2008	Johor Bahru	(China) Jiang Yanjiao	(China) Wang Lin	(Hong Kong) Wang Chen
2008	Johor Bahru	(China) Jiang Yanjiao	(China) Wang Lin	(Hong Kong) Yip Pui Yin
2009	Suwon	(China) Zhu Lin	(China) Xie Xingfang	(China) Wang Lin
2009	Suwon	(China) Zhu Lin	(China) Xie Xingfang	(China) Wang Yihan
2010	New Delhi	(China) Li Xuerui	(China) Liu Xin	(India) Saina Nehwal
2010	New Delhi	(China) Li Xuerui	(China) Liu Xin	(Hong Kong) Zhou Mi
2011	Chengdu	(China) Wang Yihan	(China) Lu Lan	(Chinese Taipei) Cheng Shao-chieh
2011	Chengdu	(China) Wang Yihan	(China) Lu Lan	(China) Jiang Yanjiao
2012	Qingdao	(China) Li Xuerui	(China) Wang Yihan	(China) Chen Xiaojia
2012	Qingdao	(China) Li Xuerui	(China) Wang Yihan	(China) Wang Shixian
2013	Taipei	(China) Wang Yihan	(China) Li Xuerui	(Japan) Eriko Hirose
2013	Taipei	(China) Wang Yihan	(China) Li Xuerui	(Japan) Sayaka Takahashi
2014	Gimcheon	(South Korea) Sung Ji-hyun	(China) Wang Shixian	(India) P. V. Sindhu
2014	Gimcheon	(South Korea) Sung Ji-hyun	(China) Wang Shixian	(Japan) Sayaka Takahashi
2015	Wuhan	(Thailand) Ratchanok Intanon	(China) Li Xuerui	(Chinese Taipei) Tai Tzu-ying
2015	Wuhan	(Thailand) Ratchanok Intanon	(China) Li Xuerui	(China) Wang Yihan
2016	Wuhan	(China) Wang Yihan	(China) Li Xuerui	(India) Saina Nehwal
2016	Wuhan	(China) Wang Yihan	(China) Li Xuerui	(South Korea) Sung Ji-hyun
2017	Wuhan	(Chinese Taipei) Tai Tzu-ying	(Japan) Akane Yamaguchi	(China) He Bingjiao
2017	Wuhan	(Chinese Taipei) Tai Tzu-ying	(Japan) Akane Yamaguchi	(South Korea) Lee Jang-mi
2018	Wuhan	(Chinese Taipei) Tai Tzu-ying	(China) Chen Yufei	(India) Saina Nehwal
2018	Wuhan	(Chinese Taipei) Tai Tzu-ying	(China) Chen Yufei	(South Korea) Sung Ji-hyun
2019	Wuhan	(Japan) Akane Yamaguchi	(China) He Bingjiao	(China) Cai Yanyan
2019	Wuhan	(Japan) Akane Yamaguchi	(China) He Bingjiao	(China) Chen Yufei
2022	Manila	(China) Wang Zhiyi	(Japan) Akane Yamaguchi	(India) P. V. Sindhu
2022	Manila	(China) Wang Zhiyi	(Japan) Akane Yamaguchi	(South Korea) An Se-young
2023	Dubai	(Chinese Taipei) Tai Tzu-ying	(South Korea) An Se-young	(Japan) Akane Yamaguchi
2023	Dubai	(Chinese Taipei) Tai Tzu-ying	(South Korea) An Se-young	(China) Chen Yufei
2024	Ningbo	(China) Wang Zhiyi	(China) Chen Yufei	(China) He Bingjiao
2024	Ningbo	(China) Wang Zhiyi	(China) Chen Yufei	(China) Han Yue
2025	Ningbo	(China) Chen Yufei	(China) Han Yue	(South Korea) Sim Yu-jin
2025	Ningbo	(China) Chen Yufei	(China) Han Yue	(China) Gao Fangjie
2026	Ningbo	(South Korea) An Se-young	(China) Wang Zhiyi	(South Korea) Sim Yu-jin
2026	Ningbo	(South Korea) An Se-young	(China) Wang Zhiyi	(Japan) Akane Yamaguchi

== Medal table ==
*Accurate as of 2026 Badminton Asia Championships.

Rank	Nation	Gold	Silver	Bronze	Total
1	China	23	24	29	76
2	South Korea	4	5	12	21
3	Hong Kong	4	2	7	13
4	Indonesia	3	2	5	10
5	Chinese Taipei	3	0	3	6
6	Japan	1	4	10	15
7	Thailand	1	1	2	4
8	England	1	1	0	2
9	Burma	0	1	0	1
10	India	0	0	7	7
11	Malaysia	0	0	1	1
11	Philippines	0	0	1	1
11	Singapore	0	0	1	1
Totals (13 entries)		40	40	78	158

== Unofficial/Invitational Asian Badminton Championships ==
Year	Host City	Gold	Silver	Bronze
1976 (I)	Bangkok	(China) Liang Qiuxia	(Indonesia) Verawaty Wiharjo	(China) Chen Yuniang
1977	Hong Kong	(China) Liang Qiuxia	(China) Liu Xia	(Japan) Saori Kondo
1978	Peking	(China) Liu Xia	(China) Zhang Ailing	(China) Xu Jung
1980	Bangkok	(China) Song Youping	(China) Sang Yanquin	(China) Chen Ruizhen
1980	Bangkok	(China) Song Youping	(China) Sang Yanquin	(China) Li Lingwei
1988	Bandar Lampung	(China) Tang Jiuhong	(China) Huang Hua	(China) Shi Wen
1988	Bandar Lampung	(China) Tang Jiuhong	(China) Huang Hua	(Indonesia) Susi Susanti
