= Liu Xia (badminton) =

Chinese badminton player

Liu Xia 刘霞
Personal information
- Born: 1955 (age 70–71) Shanghai, China

Sport
- Country: China
- Sport: Badminton
- Handedness: Right
Medal record
Women's badminton
Representing China
World Games
Gold medal – first place	1981 Santa Clara	Women's doubles
World Championships
Gold medal – first place	1979 Hangzhou	Women's team
Silver medal – second place	1979 Hangzhou	Women's doubles
Bronze medal – third place	1979 Hangzhou	Women's singles
Asian Games
Gold medal – first place	1978 Bangkok	Women's Team
Silver medal – second place	1978 Bangkok	Women's singles
Asian Championships
Silver medal – second place	1976 Hyderabad	Women's singles
Bronze medal – third place	1976 Hyderabad	Women's doubles

Liu Xia (Chinese: 刘霞; pinyin: Liú Xiá; Mandarin pronunciation: lʲə́u ɕáː, born 1955) is a former badminton player from China.

Liu is one of the players from China who played in the era of split between World Badminton Federation (WBF) and International Badminton Federation (IBF). The Chinese badminton team was the member of WBF due to dispute, she therefore wasn't able to participate in many of the big tournaments which were handled and sanctioned only by the IBF, but still excelled in various continental championships which included Asian Games, Asian Championships and Asian Invitational Championships. She was the gold medalist in the World Championship which rival organisation WBF conducted in 1979.

== Career & Early life ==
In 1970, when Liu Xia was a 15 years of age, she was studying at Chengdu No. 2 Middle School in Shanghai. Being a 15-year-old, it was the first time she was exposed to badminton and thereafter joined the Shanghai team. Just after an year, she got selected to the national badminton training team. Because of her extreme talent in the sport, which included broader skills, coordination of movements, flexible pace, etc. she immediately became the main force of the Chinese women's team. In 1975, Liu travelled to Japan with the Chinese youth team and became the press attention after defeating strongest of Japanese players at that time. After winning several Asian championships, Liu ushered in the pinnacle of her career: in the first World Games badminton competition held in the United States in July 1981, she teamed up with Zhang Ailing to win the women's doubles championship. Due to the organisational divide, the Chinese badminton team failed to participate in the World Championships, Olympic Games and other competitions, and she did not have a bigger stage to show her skills, but proved herself of being an elite player of that generation.

After retirement, Liu Xia returned to her hometown Shanghai and then went to Thailand as a coach in 1990. She also has her own business in Shanghai. On the one hand, she is in charge of the development department of the East Asian Sports and Cultural Center, and also opened an indoor badminton hall next to the Shanghai Stadium, which holds the "Liu Xia Cup" amateur badminton competition on annual basis.

== Achievements ==
=== World Games ===
Women's doubles
Year	Venue	Partner	Opponent	Score	Result
1981	San Jose Civic Auditorium, California, United States	(China) Zhang Ailing	(England) Nora Perry (England) Jane Webster	11–15, 15–4, 15–8	Gold

=== World Championships ===
Women's singles
Year	Venue	Opponent	Score	Result
1979	Hangzhou, China	(China) Han Aiping	11–4, 7–11, 0–11	Bronze

Women's doubles
Year	Venue	Partner	Opponent	Score	Result
1979	Hangzhou, China	(China) Zhang Ailing	(Thailand) Suleeporn Jittariyakul (Thailand) Sirisriro Patama	10–15, 11–15	Silver

=== Asian Games ===
Women's singles
Year	Venue	Opponent	Score	Result
1978	Bangkok, Thailand	(China) Liang Qiuxia	6–11, 5–11	Silver

=== Asian Championships ===
Women's singles
Year	Venue	Opponent	Score	Result
1976	Lal Bahadur Shastri Stadium, Hyderabad; India	(China) Liang Qiuxia	6–11, 6–11	Silver

Women's doubles
Year	Venue	Partner	Opponent	Score	Result
1976	Lal Bahadur Shastri Stadium, Hyderabad; India	(China) Zhang Ailing	(Indonesia) Regina Masli (Indonesia) Theresia Widiastuti	9–15, 8–15	Bronze

=== International tournaments ===
Women's doubles
Year	Venue	Partner	Opponent	Score	Result
1981	Scandinavian Cup	(China) Zhang Ailing	(England) Nora Perry (England) Jane Webster	12–15, 9–15	(silver) Runner-up
1981	English Masters	(China) Zhang Ailing	(England) Gillian Gilks (Japan) Yoshiko Yonekura	15–10, 3–15, 15–6	(gold) Winner

=== Invitational tournament ===
Women's singles
Year	Tournament	Opponent	Score	Result
1977	Asian Invitational Championships	(China) Liang Qiuxia	5–11, 7–11	Silver
1978	Asian Invitational Championships	(China) Zhang Ailing	11–2, 11–7	Gold

Women's doubles
Year	Tournament	Partner	Opponent	Score	Result
1977	Asian Invitational Championships	(China) Liang Qiuxia	(Japan) Mikiko Takada (Japan) Atsuko Tokuda	15–7, 15–6	Gold
