= Badminton at the 1974 Asian Games – Women's team =

Women's team at the 1974 Asian Games
- Venue: Amjadieh Sport Complex, Iran
- Dates: 5 – 9 September 1974

Medalists
gold medal	China; Chen Yuniang, Liang Qiuxia, Liu Xiaozheng, Lin Youya, Qiu Yufang, Zheng Huiming
silver medal	Indonesia; Regina Masli, Minarni Soedaryanto, Taty Sumirah, Theresia Widiastuti, Imelda Wiguna, Sri Wiyanti
bronze medal	Japan; Machiko Aizawa, Mika Ikeda, Mariko Nishio, Etsuko Takenaka, Hiroe Yuki

The badminton women's team tournament at the 1974 Asian Games took place from 5 to 9 September at the Amjadieh Sport Complex in Tehran, Iran.

== Schedule ==
All times are Iran Standard Time (UTC+03:30)

Date	Time	Event
Thursday, 5 September 1974	19:00	Quarter-finals
Saturday, 7 September 1974	18:30	Semi-finals
Sunday, 8 September 1974	18:30	Bronze medal match
Monday, 9 September 1974	19:00	Gold medal match

== Bracket ==
Quarter-finals
South Korea	3
North Korea	0
Indonesia	5
Iran	0

Semi-finals
China	3
South Korea	0
Indonesia	3
Japan	2

Gold medal match
China	3
Indonesia	2
Bronze medal match
South Korea	1
Japan	3

== Quarter-finals ==
=== South Korea vs North Korea ===
South Korea
3
Amjadieh Sport Complex
6 September 1974, 19:00

North Korea
0

			1	2	3
1	(South Korea) (North Korea)	Oh Youn-han; Bak Yon-ok	11; 8	3; 11	11; 6
2	(South Korea) (North Korea)	Ok Bok-eun; Bak Jung-sook	12; 11	11; 6
3	(South Korea) (North Korea)	Oh Youn-han / Park Ok-young; Ri Hyo-bong / So He-soon	15; 5	15; 2
4	(South Korea) (North Korea)	Ok Bok-eun / Song Hyang-soong; Bak Jung-sook / Bak Yon-ok				not played
5	(South Korea) (North Korea)	Park Ok-young; Ri Hyo-bong				not played

=== Indonesia vs Iran ===
Indonesia
5
Amjadieh Sport Complex
6 September 1974, 19:00

Iran
0

			1	2	3
1	(Indonesia) (Iran)	Sri Wiyanti; Rafat Yazdanparast	11; 0	11; 0
2	(Indonesia) (Iran)	Theresia Widiastuti; Mina Pourghobadi	11; 1	11; 2
3	(Indonesia) (Iran)	Taty Sumirah; Behnaz Nourazar	11; 0	11; 0
4	(Indonesia) (Iran)	Theresia Widiastuti / Imelda Wiguna; Behnaz Nourazar / Rafat Yazdanparast	15; 0	15; 0
5	(Indonesia) (Iran)	Regina Masli / Minarni Soedaryanto; Houri Farshidian / Mina Pourghobadi	15; 0	15; 1

== Semi-finals ==
=== China vs South Korea ===
China
3
Amjadieh Sport Complex
7 September 1974, 18:30

South Korea
0

			1	2	3
1	(China) (South Korea)	Liang Qiuxia; Oh Youn-han	11; 7	11; 2
2	(China) (South Korea)	Chen Yuniang; Ok Bon-eun	11; 1	11; 1
3	(China) (South Korea)	Lin Youya / Qiu Yufang; Oh Youn-han / Park Ok-young	15; 0	15; 12
4	(China) (South Korea)	Liang Qiuxia / Zheng Huiming; Ok Bon-eun / Song Hyang-soong				not played
5	(China) (South Korea)	Liu Xiaozheng; Park Ok-young				not played

=== Japan vs Indonesia ===
Japan
2
Amjadieh Sport Complex
7 September 1974, 18:30

Indonesia
3

			1	2	3
1	(Japan) (Indonesia)	Hiroe Yuki; Theresia Widiastuti	11; 5	11; 2
2	(Japan) (Indonesia)	Machiko Aizawa; Sri Wiyanti	11; 6	11; 7
3	(Japan) (Indonesia)	Machiko Aizawa / Etsuko Takenaka; Minarni / Theresia Widiastuti	13; 18	11; 15
4	(Japan) (Indonesia)	Mika Ikeda / Hiroe Yuki; Regina Masli / Imelda Wiguna	9; 15	5; 15
5	(Japan) (Indonesia)	Etsuko Takenaka; Taty Sumirah	8; 11	7; 11

== Bronze medal match ==
=== Japan vs South Korea ===
Japan
3
Amjadieh Sport Complex
7 September 1974, 18:30

South Korea
1

			1	2	3
1	(Japan) (South Korea)	Hiroe Yuki; Ok Bon-eun	12; 10	11; 8
2	(Japan) (South Korea)	Mariko Nishio; Oh Youn-han	11; 8	11; 8
3	(Japan) (South Korea)	Machiko Aizawa / Etsuko Takenaka; Ok Bon-eun / Song Hyang-soong	12; 15	17; 14	7; 15
4	(Japan) (South Korea)	Mika Ikeda / Hiroe Yuki; Oh Youn-han / Park Ok-young	15; 12	17; 14
5	(Japan) (South Korea)	Etsuko Takenaka; Park Ok-young				not played

== Gold medal match ==
=== Indonesia vs China ===
Indonesia
2
Amjadieh Sport Complex
9 December 1974, 19:00

China
3

			1	2	3
1	(Indonesia) (China)	Theresia Widiastuti; Chen Yuniang	9; 12	1; 11
2	(Indonesia) (China)	Sri Wiyanti; Liu Xiaozheng	6; 11	2; 11
3	(Indonesia) (China)	Regina Masli / Minarni Soedaryanto; Chen Yuniang / Liang Qiuxia	15; 12	15; 8
4	(Indonesia) (China)	Theresia Widiastuti / Imelda Wiguna; Qiu Yufang / Lin Youya	12; 15	15; 12	15; 9
5	(Indonesia) (China)	Taty Sumirah; Liang Qiuxia	7; 11	4; 11
