= Zhang Ailing =

Zhang Ailing (張愛玲, 张爱玲) may refer to:

- Eileen Chang (1920–1995), Chinese-born American essayist, novelist, and screenwriter
- Zhang Ailing (badminton) (born 1957), Chinese badminton player
