= Saori Kondo =

Japanese badminton player

Personal information
- Born: 近藤 小織; 18 March 1956 (age 70)

Sport
- Country: Japan
- Sport: Badminton
- Event: Women's singles & doubles
Medal record
Women's badminton
Representing Japan
World Cup
Bronze medal – third place	1980 Kyoto	Women's doubles
Uber Cup
Gold medal – first place	1978 Auckland	Women's team
Gold medal – first place	1981 Tokyo	Women's team
Asian Games
Bronze medal – third place	1978 Bangkok	Women's singles
Bronze medal – third place	1978 Bangkok	Women's team
Asian Championships
Bronze medal – third place	1976 Hyderabad	Women's singles

Saori Kondo (近藤 小織, Kondo Saori; born 18 March 1956) is a former badminton player who won Japanese national titles and excelled internationally in the late 1970s and early 1980s. Known for her quickness and determination, Kondo was runner-up in women's singles at the prestigious All-England Championships in both 1978 and 1979. She performed exceptionally well for the Japanese Uber Cup (women's international) teams, which won consecutive world championships in 1978 and 1981.

== Awards and nominations ==
Award	Year	Category	Result	Ref.
Asahi Sports Award	1978	Victory at the 1978 Uber Cup with the Japanese women's national team	Won	
Asahi Sports Award	1981	Victory at the 1981 Uber Cup with the Japanese women's national team	Won	

== Achievements ==
=== World Cup ===
Women's doubles

Year	Venue	Partner	Opponent	Score	Result
1980	Kyoto, Japan	(Japan) Mikiko Takada	(Indonesia) Verawaty Fadjrin (Indonesia) Imelda Wiguna	9–15, 15–11, 3–15	Bronze

=== Asian Games ===
Women's singles

Year	Venue	Opponent	Score	Result
1978	Bangkok, Thailand	(China) Liu Xia	5–11, 4–11	Bronze

=== Asian Championships ===
Women's singles

Year	Venue	Opponent	Score	Result
1976	Lal Bahadur Shastri Stadium, Hyderabad, India	(China) Liu Xia	4–11, 4–11	Bronze

=== International tournaments ===
Women's singles

Year	Tournament	Opponent	Score	Result
1977	Japan Open	(Denmark) Lene Køppen	10–12, 5–11	(silver) Runner-up
1978	All England Open	(England) Gillian Gilks	1–11, 9–11	(silver) Runner-up
1979	All England Open	(Denmark) Lene Køppen	9–13, 11–1, 8–11	(silver) Runner-up
1981	Denmark Open	(Denmark) Lene Køppen	1–11, 2–11	(silver) Runner-up
