= Davinder Ahuja =

Indian badminton player

Sport
- Country: India
- Sport: Badminton
Medal record
Representing India
Men's badminton
Asian Games
Bronze medal – third place	1974 Tehran	Men's team

Davinder Ahuja is a former badminton player. He was the national doubles champion. He was the bronze medalist in badminton at the 1974 Asian Games in the men's team event.
