= Badminton at the World Games =

Badminton Championships

Badminton was introduced and only played at the 1981 World Games. The badminton events of World Games I were held on July 25–28, 1981, at the San Jose Civic Auditorium in San Jose, California, in the United States. These were the first World Games, an international quadrennial multi-sport event, and were hosted by the city of Santa Clara. China, in its first summer multi-sport event since the 1936 Summer Olympics, competed in badminton only, winning four of the five gold medals. Seventeen of the countries at these Games participated in badminton, making it one of the most represented sports. The players executive of the International Badminton Federation, Ciro Ciniglio, expressed disappointment at the lack of media coverage of badminton, saying, "We have many world champions competing here and ... were hoping all these great players would draw crowds. ... The United States over the years has had very good players, some of the finest. It was our hope to help the sport gain popularity in the United states by showcasing all this fine talent."

== Medalists ==
Event	Gold	Silver	Bronze
Men
Singles	Chen Changjie (CHN)	Morten Frost (DEN)	Prakash Padukone (IND); Liem Swie King (INA)
Doubles	Sun Zhian; Yao Ximing (CHN)	Thomas Kihlström; Stefan Karlsson (SWE)	Billy Gilliland; Dan Travers (SCO); Hariamanto Kartono; Rudy Heryanto (INA)
Women
Singles	Zhang Ailing (CHN)	Hwang Sun-ai (KOR)	Lene Køppen (DEN); Fumiko Tohkairin (JPN)
Doubles	Zhang Ailing; Liu Xia (CHN)	Nora Perry; Jane Webster (ENG)	Hwang Sun-ai; Kim Yun-ja (KOR); Fumiko Tohkairin; Sonoe Otsuka (JPN)
Mixed
Doubles	Gillian Gilks (ENG); Thomas Kihlström (SWE)	Nora Perry; Mike Tredgett (ENG)	Imelda Wiguna; Christian Hadinata (INA); Lene Køppen; Steen Skovgaard (DEN)

== Results ==
=== Men's singles ===
First round
Liem Swie King (Indonesia), bye; S. Egbeyemi (Nigeria) def. K. Zeniya (Japan), 15-1, 15-4; S. Modi (India) won by default over J. Sidek (Malaysia); R. Stevens (England) def. A. Salazar (Peru), 15-4, 15-7; Morten Frost Hansen (Denmark) def. P. Johnson (Canada), 15-3, 15-4; G. Valdez (Peru) won by default over M. Sidek (Malaysia); Stephen Baddeley (England) def. G. Higgins (USA) 15-7, 15-8; M. Hadiyanto (Indonesia) won by default over J. P. Baudoin (Belgium)
Second round
M. Hadiyanto (Indonesia) d. Stephen Baddeley (England); plus other matches

Quarter-finals
(Indonesia) Liem Swie King	15	15
(England) Ray Stevens	3	7
(Indonesia) Hadiyanto	10	6
(Denmark) Morten Frost	15	15
(China) Chen Changjie	18	15
(England) Kevin Jolly	14	8
(Canada) Pat Tryon	5	3
(India) Prakash Padukone	15	15

Semi-finals
(Indonesia) Liem Swie King	14	15	6
(Denmark) Morten Frost	18	11	15
(China) Chen Changjie	18	18
(India) Prakash Padukone	14	16

Final
(Denmark) Morten Frost	15	7	12
(China) Chen Changjie	9	15	15

=== Women's singles ===
First round
Jane Webster (England) d. U. Kinard (USA), 11-7, 11-6; A. Tokuda (sic) (Tōkairin) (Japan) won by default over J. Youngberg (Canada); Yun Ja Kim (South Korea) won by default over L. I. Ivana (Indonesia); C. Carton (USA), d. C. Blackhouse (Canada), 11-7, 11-12, 11-7; Y. Yonekura (Japan) won by default over A. Ghia (India)
Second round
Sun Ai Hwang (South Korea) d. G. Edwards (Nigeria), 11-0, 11-1; L. Blumer (Switzerland) won by default over W. Carter (Canada); L. S. Yeng (Chinese Taipei) won by default over V. Wiharjo (Indonesia); Tōkairin (Japan) d. Webster (England), 11-7, 11-6; Kim (South Korea) d. Carton (USA), 12-11, 11-1; Lene Koppen, (Denmark), d. Yonekura, 11-3, 11-3; Gillian Gilks (England), won by default over T. Sumirah (Indonesia); Zhang Ailing (China), won by default over S. Skillings (Canada).

Quarter-finals
(South Korea) Hwang Sun-ai	11	11
(Switzerland) Liselotte Blumer	3	3
(Japan) Fumiko Tōkairin	11	11
(China) Liu Xia	7	6
(Denmark) Lene Køppen	11	11	11
(South Korea) Kim Yun-ja	4	12	9
(England) Gillian Gilks	1	12	0
(China) Zhang Ailing	11	11	11

Semi-finals
(South Korea) Hwang Sun-ai	11	11
(Japan) Fumiko Tōkairin	1	2
(Denmark) Lene Køppen	4	1
(China) Zhang Ailing	11	11

Final
(South Korea) Hwang Sun-ai	11	9	9
(China) Zhang Ailing	7	11	12

=== Men's doubles ===
Quarter-finals
(Indonesia) Rudy Heryanto (Indonesia) Kartono	15	15
(England) Steve Baddeley (England) Kevin Jolly	9	10
(China) Sun Zhian (China) Yao Ximing (Note: Sun Zhian/Yao Ximing (China) defeated Delfs/Steen Skovgaard (Denmark) in an earlier round.)	17	2	15
(Indonesia) Ade Chandra (Indonesia) Christian Hadinata	14	15	12
(Sweden) Stefan Karlsson (Sweden) Thomas Kihlström	15	15
(England) Ray Stevens (England) Mike Tredgett	12	10
(Nigeria) Babatunde Badru (Nigeria) Samson Egbeyemi	6	6
(Scotland) Billy Gilliland (Scotland) Dan Travers	15	15

Semi-finals
(Indonesia) Rudy Heryanto (Indonesia) Kartono	15	11	8
(China) Sun Zhian (China) Yao Ximing	3	15	15
(Sweden) Stefan Karlsson (Sweden) Thomas Kihlström	10	15	15
(Scotland) Billy Gilliland (Scotland) Dan Travers	15	0	9

Final
(China) Sun Zhian (China) Yao Ximing	12	15	15
(Sweden) Stefan Karlsson (Sweden) Thomas Kihlström	15	4	6

=== Women's doubles ===
Quarter-finals
(England) Nora Perry (England) Jane Webster	15	15
(United States) Judianne Kelly (United States) Vicki Toutz	4	4
(Indonesia) Imelda Wiguna (Japan) Yoshiko Yonekura	4	18	4
(South Korea) Hwang Sun-ai (South Korea) Kim Yun-ja	15	14	15
(Japan) Sonoe Ōtsuka (Japan) Fumiko Tōkairin	w	/	o
(Canada) Wendy Carter (Canada) Sandra Skillings
(Nigeria) Oby Edoga (Nigeria) Grace Edward
(China) Liu Xia (China) Zhang Ailing	w	/	o

Semi-finals
(England) Nora Perry (England) Jane Webster	8	17	15
(South Korea) Hwang Sun-ai (South Korea) Kim Yun-ja	15	14	10
(Japan) Sonoe Ōtsuka (Japan) Fumiko Tōkairin	4	5
(China) Liu Xia (China) Zhang Ailing	15	15

Final
(England) Nora Perry (England) Jane Webster	15	4	8
(China) Liu Xia (China) Zhang Ailing	11	15	15

=== Mixed doubles ===
Quarter-finals (Note: Badminton-Sport 29 (1981) (9), S. 14)
(England) Mike Tredgett (England) Nora Perry	15	15
(China) Li Mao (China) Song Youping	11	3
(Nigeria) Babatunde Badiru (Nigeria) Grace Edwards	5	1
(Denmark) Steen Skovgaard (Denmark) Lene Køppen	15	15
(Indonesia) Christian Hadinata (Indonesia) Imelda Wiguna	15	15
(United States) Bob Gilmour (United States) Vicki Toutz	2	5
(Scotland) Billy Gilliland (England) Karen Chapman	15	6
(Sweden) Thomas Kihlström (England) Gillian Gilks	17	15

Semi-finals
(England) Mike Tredgett (England) Nora Perry	11	15	15
(Denmark) Steen Skovgaard (Denmark) Lene Køppen	15	4	8
(Indonesia) Christian Hadinata (Indonesia) Imelda Wiguna	8	8
(Sweden) Thomas Kihlström (England) Gillian Gilks	15	15

Final
(England) Mike Tredgett (England) Nora Perry	6	14
(Sweden) Thomas Kihlström (England) Gillian Gilks	15	18
