= Ade Chandra =

Indonesian badminton player

Personal information
- Born: Thio Kim Gwan; 4 February 1950 (age 76)

Sport
- Country: Indonesia
- Sport: Badminton
- Handedness: Right
- Event: Men's doubles
Medal record
Men's badminton
Representing Indonesia
World Championships
Gold medal – first place	1980 Jakarta	Men's doubles
Silver medal – second place	1977 Malmö	Men's doubles
World Cup
Gold medal – first place	1979 Tokyo	Men's doubles
Gold medal – first place	1980 Kyoto	Men's doubles
Thomas Cup
Gold medal – first place	1973 Jakarta	Men's team
Gold medal – first place	1976 Bangkok	Men's team
Asian Games
Gold medal – first place	1978 Bangkok	Men's team
Gold medal – first place	1978 Bangkok	Men's doubles
Silver medal – second place	1974 Tehran	Men's team
Silver medal – second place	1974 Tehran	Men's doubles
Asian Championships
Gold medal – first place	1971 Jakarta	Men's team
Gold medal – first place	1976 Hyderabad	Men's team
Gold medal – first place	1976 Hyderabad	Men's doubles
Bronze medal – third place	1971 Jakarta	Men's doubles
SEA Games
Gold medal – first place	1977 Kuala Lumpur	Men's team
Gold medal – first place	1979 Jakarta	Men's team
Silver medal – second place	1979 Jakarta	Men's doubles

Ade Chandra (Chinese: 張鑫源; born 4 February 1950) is an Indonesian retired badminton player.

== Career ==
A doubles specialist of ample bulk by Indonesian standards, he was noted for his power and quick defensive reflexes. With the formidable Christian Hadinata he won numerous international men's doubles titles between 1972 and 1980, including a pair of All-England titles, though they were often runners-up to fellow countrymen Tjun Tjun and Johan Wahjudi at major events . They were unbeaten in two Thomas Cup campaigns together (1973, 1976) both of which resulted in world team titles for Indonesia. Late in Chandra's career he won men's doubles with Christian at the 1980 IBF World Championships in Jakarta.

== Awards and nominations ==
Award	Year	Category	Result	Ref.
International Badminton Federation Awards	1986	Meritorious Service Award	Honored	

== Achievements ==
=== Olympic Games (demonstration) ===
Men's doubles
Year	Venue	Partner	Opponent	Score	Result	Ref.
1972	Volleyballhalle, Munich, West Germany	(Indonesia) Christian Hadinata	(Malaysia) Punch Gunalan (Malaysia) Ng Boon Bee	15–4, 2–15, 15–11	Gold	

=== World Championships ===
Men's doubles
Year	Venue	Partner	Opponent	Score	Result	Ref.
1977	Malmö Isstadion, Malmö, Sweden	(Indonesia) Christian Hadinata	(Indonesia) Tjun Tjun (Indonesia) Johan Wahjudi	6–15, 4–15	Silver	
1980	Istora Senayan, Jakarta, Indonesia	(Indonesia) Christian Hadinata	(Indonesia) Rudy Heryanto (Indonesia) Kartono	5–15, 15–5, 15–7	Gold	

=== World Cup ===
Men's doubles
Year	Venue	Partner	Opponent	Score	Result
1979	Tokyo, Japan	(Indonesia) Christian Hadinata	(Japan) Yoshitaka Iino (Japan) Masao Tsuchida	15–8, 15–3	Gold
1980	Kyoto, Japan	(Indonesia) Christian Hadinata	(Denmark) Flemming Delfs (Denmark) Steen Skovgaard	15–6, 15–3	Gold

=== Asian Games ===
Men's doubles
Year	Venue	Partner	Opponent	Score	Result
1974	Amjadieh Sport Complex, Tehran, Iran	(Indonesia) Christian Hadinata	(Indonesia) Tjun Tjun (Indonesia) Johan Wahjudi	9–15, 7–15	Silver
1978	Indoor Stadium Huamark, Bangkok, Thailand	(Indonesia) Christian Hadinata	(China) Lin Shiquan (China) Tang Xianhu	15–8, 15–10	Gold

=== Asian Championships ===
Men's doubles
Year	Venue	Partner	Opponent	Score	Result
1971	Istora Senayan, Jakarta, Indonesia	(Indonesia) Christian Hadinata	(India) Dipu Ghosh (India) Raman Ghosh	15–3, 15–6	Bronze
1976	Lal Bahadur Shastri Stadium, Hyderabad, India	(Indonesia) Tjun Tjun	(China) Sun Zhian (China) Yao Ximing	Walkover	Gold

=== SEA Games ===
Men's doubles
Year	Venue	Partner	Opponent	Score	Result
1979	Gema Sumantri Hall, Jakarta, Indonesia	(Indonesia) Christian Hadinata	(Thailand) Bandid Jaiyen (Thailand) Preecha Sopajaree	9–15, 5–15	Silver

=== International tournaments (8 titles, 9 runners-up) ===
Men's doubles
Year	Tournament	Partner	Opponent	Score	Result
1971	Singapore Open	(Indonesia) Christian Hadinata	(Japan) Junji Honma (Japan) Ippei Kojima	15–10, 15–8	(gold) Winner
1972	All England Open	(Indonesia) Christian Hadinata	(England) Ray Stevens (England) Mike Tredgett	15–5, 15–12	(gold) Winner
1973	All England Open	(Indonesia) Christian Hadinata	(Indonesia) Tjun Tjun (Indonesia) Johan Wahjudi	15–1, 15–7	(gold) Winner
1973	German Open	(Indonesia) Christian Hadinata	(Indonesia) Tjun Tjun (Indonesia) Johan Wahjudi	4–15, 9–15	(silver) Runner-up
1973	Denmark Open	(Indonesia) Christian Hadinata	(Indonesia) Tjun Tjun (Indonesia) Johan Wahjudi	3–15, 7–15	(silver) Runner-up
1974	All England Open	(Indonesia) Christian Hadinata	(Indonesia) Tjun Tjun (Indonesia) Johan Wahjudi	8–15, 6–15	(silver) Runner-up
1974	Jamaica International	(Indonesia) Herman	(Canada) Jamie Paulson (Canada) Yves Paré	16–17, 15–8, 15–7	(gold) Winner
1975	All England Open	(Indonesia) Christian Hadinata	(Indonesia) Tjun Tjun (Indonesia) Johan Wahjudi	11–15, 5–15	(silver) Runner-up
1975	Denmark Open	(Indonesia) Christian Hadinata	(Indonesia) Tjun Tjun (Indonesia) Johan Wahjudi	6–15, 1–15	(silver) Runner-up
1977	All England Open	(Indonesia) Christian Hadinata	(Indonesia) Tjun Tjun (Indonesia) Johan Wahjudi	7–15, 15–18	(silver) Runner-up
1977	Swedish Open	(Indonesia) Tjun Tjun	(Sweden) Bengt Fröman (Sweden) Thomas Kihlström	17–18, 17–16, 15–11	(gold) Winner
1978	All England Open	(Indonesia) Christian Hadinata	(Indonesia) Tjun Tjun (Indonesia) Johan Wahjudi	12–15, 8–15	(silver) Runner-up
1978	Denmark Open	(Indonesia) Christian Hadinata	(Denmark) Flemming Delfs (Denmark) Steen Skovgaard	6–15, 11–15	(silver) Runner-up
1979	Canadian Open	(Indonesia) Christian Hadinata	(Denmark) Flemming Delfs (Denmark) Morten Frost	15–5, 15–1	(gold) Winner
1980	Swedish Open	(Indonesia) Christian Hadinata	(Sweden) Bengt Fröman (Sweden) Thomas Kihlström	15–5, 12–15, 15–9	(gold) Winner
1981	Denmark Open	(Indonesia) Christian Hadinata	(Sweden) Stefan Karlsson (Sweden) Thomas Kihlström	15–5, 15–18, 15–10	(gold) Winner

Mixed doubles
Year	Tournament	Partner	Opponent	Score	Result
1979	Canadian Open	(Indonesia) Verawaty Wiharjo	(Indonesia) Christian Hadinata (Indonesia) Imelda Wiguna	6–15, 1–15	(silver) Runner-up

=== Invitational tournaments ===
Men's doubles
Year	Tournament	Partner	Opponent	Score	Result
1976	Asian Invitational Championships	(Indonesia) Christian Hadinata	(China) Luan Jin (China) Tang Xianhu	15–8, 15–10	Gold
1977	Asian Invitational Championships	(Indonesia) Christian Hadinata	(Indonesia) Tjun Tjun (Indonesia) Johan Wahjudi	17–14, 2–15, 5–15	Silver

=== Other tournament ===
Men's doubles
Year	Tournament	Partner	Opponent	Score	Result	Ref.
1983	Veterans Tournament (30+)	(Indonesia) Dhany Sartika	(Indonesia) Tjun Tjun (Indonesia) Johan Wahjudi	10–15, 1–15	(silver) Runner-up	

== Bibliography ==
- Suryadinata, Leo (1995), Prominent Indonesian Chinese: Biographical Sketches (3rd ed.), Singapore: Institute of Southeast Asian Studies, ISBN 978-981-3055-04-9.
