= 1977 Asian Invitational Badminton Championships =

Badminton championships

Tournament details
- Dates: 23 – 27 February
- Edition: 2
- Location: Hong Kong

The 1977 Asian Invitational Badminton Championships which was the second edition of Asian Invitational Championships took place in the month of February in Hong Kong. The individual competitions except Mixed doubles were conducted. A total of thirteen Asian countries took part in this event. At the end of day, China won all the disciplines except Men's doubles which was won by Indonesia.

== Medalists ==
Discipline	Gold	Silver	Bronze
Men's singles	(China) Yu Yaodong	(China) Luan Jin	(China) Lin Shiquan
Women's singles	(China) Liang Qiuxia	(China) Liu Xia	(Japan) Saori Kondo
Men's doubles	(Indonesia) Johan Wahjudi (Indonesia) Tjun Tjun	(Indonesia) Ade Chandra (Indonesia) Christian Hadinata	(China) Yao Ximing (China) Sun Zhian
Women's doubles	(China) Liang Qiuxia (China) Liu Xia	(Japan) Mikiko Takada (Japan) Atsuko Tokuda	(Malaysia) Rosalind Singha Ang (Malaysia) Sylvia Ng

== Men's singles ==
Semifinal
(China) Yu Yaodong	15	15
(China) Lin Shiquan	5	9
(China) Yao Ximing	4	6
(China) Luan Jin	15	15

Final
(China) Yu Yaodong	15	15
(China) Luan Jin	6	8
Third place
(China) Lin Shiquan	15	15
(China) Yao Ximing	5	9

== Women's singles ==
Semifinal
(China) Liang Qiuxia	11	11
(Japan) Saori Kondo	7	3
(South Korea) Park Ok-yun	3	1
(China) Liu Xia	11	11

Final
(China) Liang Qiuxia	11	11
(China) Liu Xia	5	7
Third place
(Japan) Saori Kondo	11	6	11
(South Korea) Park Ok-yun	1	11	3

== Men's doubles ==
Semi-finals
(Indonesia) Ade Chandra (Indonesia) Christian Hadinata	18	15
(China) Yao Ximing (China) Sun Zhian	17	7
(China) Hou Jiachang (China) Yu Yaodong	11	15	4
(Indonesia) Johan Wahjudi (Indonesia) Tjun Tjun	15	8	15

Final
(Indonesia) Ade Chandra (Indonesia) Christian Hadinata	17	2	5
(Indonesia) Johan Wahjudi (Indonesia) Tjun Tjun	14	15	15
Third place
(China) Yao Ximing (China) Sun Zhian	w	/	o
(China) Hou Jiachang (China) Yu Yaodong

== Women's doubles ==
Semi-finals
(Malaysia) Rosalind Singha Ang (Malaysia) Sylvia Ng	15	9	3
(China) Liang Qiuxia (China) Liu Xia	7	15	15
(Japan) Mikiko Takada (Japan) Atsuko Tokuda	15	10	15
(Thailand) Kingmanee Thongkam (Thailand) Sirisriro Patama	5	15	5

Final
(China) Liang Qiuxia (China) Liu Xia	15	15
(Japan) Mikiko Takada (Japan) Atsuko Tokuda	7	6
Third place
(Malaysia) Rosalind Singha Ang (Malaysia) Sylvia Ng	15	15
(Thailand) Kingmanee Thongkam (Thailand) Sirisriro Patama	7	3
