= Theresia Widiastuti =

Indonesian badminton player

Personal information
- Born: Yogyakarta, Yogyakarta SR, Indonesia

Sport
- Country: Indonesia
- Sport: Badminton
- Event: Women's & mixed doubles
Medal record
Women's badminton
Representing Indonesia
Uber Cup
Gold medal – first place	1975 Jakarta	Women's team
Silver medal – second place	1978 Auckland	Women's team
Silver medal – second place	1981 Tokyo	Women's team
Asian Games
Silver medal – second place	1974 Tehran	Women's team
Silver medal – second place	1978 Bangkok	Women's team
Silver medal – second place	1978 Bangkok	Mixed doubles
Bronze medal – third place	1970 Bangkok	Women's team
Bronze medal – third place	1974 Tehran	Women's doubles
Bronze medal – third place	1978 Bangkok	Women's doubles
Asian Championships
Gold medal – first place	1976 Hyderabad	Women's doubles
SEA Games
Gold medal – first place	1977 Kuala Lumpur	Women's doubles
Gold medal – first place	1977 Kuala Lumpur	Women's doubles
Gold medal – first place	1979 Jakarta	Women's team
Gold medal – first place	1981 Manila	Women's team
Silver medal – second place	1979 Jakarta	Women's doubles
Silver medal – second place	1981 Manila	Women's doubles
Silver medal – second place	1981 Manila	Mixed doubles

Theresia Widiastuti (born 1954) is an Indonesian former badminton player in the 70s.

== Profile ==
Theresia Widiastuti is a specialist in women's doubles and mixed Indonesian players. In the 1975 Uber Cup, she played an important and decisive role because she managed to win in two women's doubles matches with Imelda Wiguna against Japanese women's doubles and led Indonesia to win the Uber Cup for the first time. In the 1976 Asian championships she also won the women's doubles with Regina Masli. and won two bronze in women's doubles in the 1974 and 1978 Asian games and one mixed doubles silver.

== Achievements ==
=== Asian Games ===
Women's doubles
Year	Venue	Partner	Opponent	Score	Result
1974	Amjadieh Sport Complex, Tehran, Iran	(Indonesia) Imelda Wiguna	(Indonesia) Minarni (Indonesia) Regina Masli		Bronze
1978	Indoor Stadium Huamark, Bangkok, Thailand	(Indonesia) Ruth Damayanti	(China) Qiu Yufang (China) Zheng Huiming	5–15, 12–15	Bronze

Mixed doubles
Year	Venue	Partner	Opponent	Score	Result
1978	Indoor Stadium Huamark, Bangkok, Thailand	(Indonesia) Kartono	(China) Tang Xianhu (China) Zhang Ailing	8–15, 16–17	Silver

=== Asian Championships ===
Women's doubles
Year	Venue	Partner	Opponent	Score	Result	Ref.
1976	Lal Bahadur Shastri Stadium, Hyderabad, India	(Indonesia) Regina Masli	(China) He Cuiling (China) Liang Qiuxia	15–8, 17–18, 15–6	Gold	

=== SEA Games ===
Women's doubles
Year	Venue	Partner	Opponent	Score	Result	Ref.
1977	Stadium Negara, Kuala Lumpur, Malaysia	(Indonesia) Regina Masli	(Malaysia) Rosalind Singha Ang (Malaysia) Sylvia Ng	15–2, 15–4	Gold	
1979	Gema Sumantri Hall, Jakarta, Indonesia	(Indonesia) Ruth Damayanti	(Indonesia) Imelda Wiguna (Indonesia) Verawaty Wiharjo	4–15, 2–15	Silver	
1981	Camp Crame Gymnasium, Manila, Philippines	(Indonesia) Imelda Wiguna	(Indonesia) Ruth Damayanti (Indonesia) Verawaty Fadjrin	13–15, 4–15	Silver	

Mixed doubles
Year	Venue	Partner	Opponent	Score	Result	Ref.
1981	Camp Crame Gymnasium, Manila, Philippines	(Indonesia) Sigit Pamungkas	(Indonesia) Rudy Heryanto (Indonesia) Imelda Wiguna	12–15, 5–15	Silver	

=== International tournaments (2 titles, 1 runner-up) ===
Women's doubles
Year	Tournament	Partner	Opponent	Score	Result	Ref.
1973	Singapore Open	(Indonesia) Sri Wiyanti	(Thailand) Thongkam Kingmanee (Thailand) Sirisriro Patama	15–10, 15–10	(gold) Winner	
1975	Denmark Open	(Indonesia) Imelda Wiguna	(Denmark) Inge Borgstrøm (Denmark) Lene Køppen	3–15, 15–3, 15–10	(gold) Winner	
1975	All England Open	(Indonesia) Imelda Wiguna	(Japan) Machiko Aizawa (Japan) Etsuko Takanaka	11–15, 14–17	(silver) Runner-up	

=== Invitational tournament ===
Women's doubles
Year	Tournament	Partner	Opponent	Score	Result	Ref.
1975	World Invitational Championships	(Indonesia) Imelda Wiguna	(England) Margaret Beck (England) Gillian Gilks	6–15, 3–15	Silver	
