= 1980 Badminton World Cup =

Badminton championships

Tournament details
- Dates: 20–22 January 1980
- Edition: 2nd
- Location: Kyoto, Japan

The 1980 Badminton World Cup was the second edition of an international tournament Badminton World Cup. The event was held in Kyoto, Japan in the month of January. Competitions for mixed doubles were not conducted. Indonesia won men's singles and men's doubles events while Japan won women's doubles and Denmark won women's singles event.

== Medalists ==
Event	Gold	Silver	Bronze
Men's singles	(Indonesia) Liem Swie King	(Japan) Masao Tsuchida	(India) Prakash Padukone
Men's singles	(Indonesia) Liem Swie King	(Japan) Masao Tsuchida	(Denmark) Flemming Delfs
Women's singles	(Denmark) Lene Køppen	(Japan) Hiroe Yuki	(Japan) Yoshiko Yonekura
Women's singles	(Denmark) Lene Køppen	(Japan) Hiroe Yuki	(Denmark) Kirsten Larsen
Men's doubles	(Indonesia) Ade Chandra (Indonesia) Christian Hadinata	(Denmark) Flemming Delfs (Denmark) Steen Skovgaard	(Japan) Mikio Ozaki (Japan) Nobutake Ikeda
Men's doubles	(Indonesia) Ade Chandra (Indonesia) Christian Hadinata	(Denmark) Flemming Delfs (Denmark) Steen Skovgaard	(Japan) Yoshitaka Iino (Japan) Masao Tsuchida
Women's doubles	(Japan) Atsuko Tokuda (Japan) Yoshiko Yonekura	(Indonesia) Verawaty Wiharjo (Indonesia) Imelda Wiguna	(Japan) Saori Kondo (Japan) Mikiko Takada
Women's doubles	(Japan) Atsuko Tokuda (Japan) Yoshiko Yonekura	(Indonesia) Verawaty Wiharjo (Indonesia) Imelda Wiguna	(England) Jane Webster (England) Nora Perry

== Semifinal results ==
- Below are the semifinal results for the World Cup.

Discipline	Winner	Runner-up	Score
Men's singles	(Indonesia) Liem Swie King	(India) Prakash Padukone	15–12, 15–6
Men's singles	(Japan) Masao Tsuchida	(Denmark) Flemming Delfs	15–10, 15–13
Women's singles	(Denmark) Lene Køppen	(Japan) Yoshiko Yonekura	11–8, 11–5
Women's singles	(Japan) Hiroe Yuki	(Denmark) Kirsten Larsen	11–7, 11–5
Men's doubles	(Indonesia) Ade Chandra & Christian Hadinata	(Japan) Mikio Ozaki & Nobutake Ikeda	15–10, 15–7
Men's doubles	(Denmark) Flemming Delfs & Steen Skovgaard	(Japan) Yoshitaka Iino & Masao Tsuchida	15–10, 15–10
Women's doubles	(Indonesia) Verawaty Fadjrin & Imelda Wiguna	(Japan) Saori Kondo & Mikiko Takada	15–9, 11–15, 15–3
Women's doubles	(Japan) Atsuko Tokuda & Yoshiko Yonekura	(England) Nora Perry & Jane Webster	15–4, 16–17, 15–5

== Final results ==
Discipline	Winner	Finalist	Score
Men's singles	(Indonesia) Liem Swie King	(Japan) Masao Tsuchida	15–6, 15–10
Women's singles	(Denmark) Lene Køppen	(Japan) Hiroe Yuki	11–4, 12–10
Men's doubles	(Indonesia) Ade Chandra (Indonesia) Christian Hadinata	(Denmark) Flemming Delfs (Denmark) Steen Skovgaard	15–6, 15–3
Women's doubles	(Japan) Atsuko Tokuda (Japan) Yoshiko Yonekura	(Indonesia) Verawaty Wiharjo (Indonesia) Imelda Wiguna	15–12, 17–14
