= 1976 Asian Badminton Championships =

Badminton championships

Tournament details
- Dates: 30 October – 7 November
- Edition: 5
- Venue: Lal Bahadur Shastri Stadium, Hyderabad
- Location: Hyderabad, India

The Asian Badminton Championships 1976 took place from 30 October- 7 November in Hyderabad India. Indonesia won the men's team competition after beating China 3–2 in the final. The match for third place between Japan and Malaysia also ended 3–2.

== Medalists ==
Discipline	Gold	Silver	Bronze
Men's singles	(China) Hou Jiachang	(Indonesia) Liem Swie King	(China) Luan Jin
Men's singles	(China) Hou Jiachang	(Indonesia) Liem Swie King	(India) Prakash Padukone
Women's singles	(China) Liang Qiuxia	(China) Liu Xia	(China) Li Fang
Women's singles	(China) Liang Qiuxia	(China) Liu Xia	(Japan) Saori Kondo
Men's doubles	(Indonesia) Tjun Tjun (Indonesia) Ade Chandra	(China) Yao Ximing (China) Sun Zhi’an	(Thailand) Jiamsak Panitchaikul (Thailand) Surapong Suharitdamrong
Men's doubles	(Indonesia) Tjun Tjun (Indonesia) Ade Chandra	(China) Yao Ximing (China) Sun Zhi’an	(Japan) Shoichi Toganoo (Japan) Nobutaka Ikeda
Women's doubles	(Indonesia) Theresia Widiastuti (Indonesia) Regina Masli	(China) Liang Qiuxia (China) He Cuiling	(China) Liu Xia (China) Zhang Ailing
Women's doubles	(Indonesia) Theresia Widiastuti (Indonesia) Regina Masli	(China) Liang Qiuxia (China) He Cuiling	(Indonesia) Verawaty Wiharjo (Indonesia) Holly Tanjung
Mixed doubles	(China) Fang Kaixiang (China) He Cuiling	(Japan) Shoichi Toganoo (Japan) Etsuko Toganoo	(China) Sun Zhian (China) Li Fang
Mixed doubles	(China) Fang Kaixiang (China) He Cuiling	(Japan) Shoichi Toganoo (Japan) Etsuko Toganoo	(Japan) Masao Tsuchida (Japan) Mika Ikeda
Men's team	Indonesia; Liem Swie King; Tjun Tjun; Ade Chandra; Iie Sumirat	China; Luan Jin; Fang Kaixiang; Sun Zhi’an; Chen Tianxiang	(Japan) Japan; Shoichi Toganoo; Kinji Zeniya; Masao Tsuchida; Yoshitaka Iino

== Medal table ==
Rank	Nation	Gold	Silver	Bronze	Total
1	China	3	4	4	11
2	Indonesia	3	1	1	5
3	Japan	0	1	4	5
4	India	0	0	1	1
4	Thailand	0	0	1	1
Totals (5 entries)		6	6	11	23

== Semifinal results ==
- Source

Discipline	Winner	Runner-up	Score
Men's singles	(China) Hou Jiachang	(China) Luan Jin	Walkover
Men's singles	(Indonesia) Liem Swie King	(India) Prakash Padukone	15–8, 15–3
Women's singles	(China) Liang Qiuxia	(China) Li Fang	11–4, 11–4
Women's singles	(China) Liu Xia	(Japan) Saori Kondo	11–4, 11–4
Men's doubles	(Indonesia) Ade Chandra (Indonesia) Tjun Tjun	(Thailand) Jiamsak Panitchaikul (Thailand) Surapong Suharitdamrong	15–12, 15–7
Men's doubles	(China) Sun Zhian (China) Yao Ximing	(Japan) Shoichi Toganoo (Japan) Nobutake Ikeda	15–8, 15–9
Women's doubles	(Indonesia) Theresia Widiastuti (Indonesia) Regina Masli	(China) Liu Xia (China) Zhang Ailing	15–9, 15–8
Women's doubles	(China) Liang Qiuxia (China) He Cuiling	(Indonesia) Verawaty Wiharjo (Indonesia) Holly Tanjung	15–1, 15–4
Mixed doubles	(China) Fang Kaixiang (China) He Cuiling	(Japan) Masao Tsuchida (Japan) Mika Ikeda	15–18, 15–8, 15–6
Mixed doubles	(Japan) Shoichi Toganoo (Japan) Etsuko Toganoo	(China) Sun Zhian (China) Li Fang	15–11, 6–12 retired

== Final results ==
Discipline	Winner	Finalist	Score
Men's singles	(China) Hou Jiachang	(Indonesia) Liem Swie King	17–16, 15–9
Women's singles	(China) Liang Qiuxia	(China) Liu Xia	11–6, 11–6
Men's doubles	(Indonesia) Ade Chandra (Indonesia) Tjun Tjun	(China) Yao Ximing (China) Sun Zhian	Walkover
Women's doubles	(Indonesia) Regina Masli (Indonesia) Theresia Widiastuti	(China) He Cuiling (China) Liang Qiuxia	13–18, 18–17, 15–6
Mixed doubles	(China) Fang Kaixiang (China) He Cuiling	(Japan) Shoichi Toganoo (Japan) Etsuko Toganoo	15–12, 15–12

== Sources ==
- World Badminton (1976)
