= Badminton at the 1978 Asian Games =

- Venue: Indoor Stadium Huamark
- Dates: 11–20 December
- Nations: 11

Badminton tournaments were held for the fifth time at the 8th Asian Games in 1978 from 11 December to 20 December in Bangkok, Thailand.

== Medalists ==
Event	Gold	Silver	Bronze
Men's singles	Liem Swie King; Indonesia	Han Jian; China	Iie Sumirat; Indonesia
Men's singles	Liem Swie King; Indonesia	Han Jian; China	Luan Jin; China
Men's doubles	Indonesia; Ade Chandra; Christian Hadinata	China; Tang Xianhu; Lin Shiquan	China; Hou Jiachang; Yu Yaodong
Men's doubles	Indonesia; Ade Chandra; Christian Hadinata	China; Tang Xianhu; Lin Shiquan	Hong Kong; Fu Han Ping; Wong Man Hing
Men's team	Indonesia; Ade Chandra; Christian Hadinata; Rudy Heryanto; Kartono; Liem Swie King; Iie Sumirat	China; Han Jian; Hou Jiachang; Lin Shiquan; Luan Jin; Tang Xianhu; Yu Yaodong	Thailand; Sawei Chanseorasmee; Bandid Jaiyen; Pichai Kongsirithavorn; Udom Luangpetcharaporn; Sarit Pisudchaikul; Surapong Suharitdamrong
Men's team	Indonesia; Ade Chandra; Christian Hadinata; Rudy Heryanto; Kartono; Liem Swie King; Iie Sumirat	China; Han Jian; Hou Jiachang; Lin Shiquan; Luan Jin; Tang Xianhu; Yu Yaodong	Pakistan; Javed Iqbal; Zahid Maqbool; Hassan Shaheed; Tariq Wadood
Women's singles	Liang Qiuxia; China	Liu Xia; China	Sirisriro Patama; Thailand
Women's singles	Liang Qiuxia; China	Liu Xia; China	Saori Kondo; Japan
Women's doubles	Indonesia; Verawaty Wiharjo; Imelda Wiguna	China; Qiu Yufang; Zheng Huiming	Indonesia; Theresia Widiastuti; Ruth Damayanti
Women's doubles	Indonesia; Verawaty Wiharjo; Imelda Wiguna	China; Qiu Yufang; Zheng Huiming	Thailand; Sirisriro Patama; Thongkam Kingmanee
Women's team	China; Li Fang; Liang Qiuxia; Liu Xia; Qiu Yufang; Zhang Ailing; Zheng Huiming	Indonesia; Ruth Damayanti; Ivana Lie; Tjan So Gwan; Theresia Widiastuti; Imelda Wiguna; Verawaty Wiharjo	Japan; Saori Kondo; Mikiko Takada; Atsuko Tokuda; Emiko Ueno; Yoshiko Yonekura; Hiroe Yuki
Women's team	China; Li Fang; Liang Qiuxia; Liu Xia; Qiu Yufang; Zhang Ailing; Zheng Huiming	Indonesia; Ruth Damayanti; Ivana Lie; Tjan So Gwan; Theresia Widiastuti; Imelda Wiguna; Verawaty Wiharjo	Thailand; Porntip Buntanon; Suleeporn Jittariyakul; Thongkam Kingmanee; Petchroong Liengtrakulngam; Sirisriro Patama
Mixed doubles	China; Tang Xianhu; Zhang Ailing	Indonesia; Kartono; Theresia Widiastuti	Indonesia; Christian Hadinata; Imelda Wiguna
Mixed doubles	China; Tang Xianhu; Zhang Ailing	Indonesia; Kartono; Theresia Widiastuti	China; Yu Yaodong; Li Fang

== Medal table ==
Rank	Nation	Gold	Silver	Bronze	Total
1	Indonesia (INA)	4	2	3	9
2	China (CHN)	3	5	3	11
3	Thailand (THA)	0	0	4	4
4	Japan (JPN)	0	0	2	2
5	Hong Kong (HKG)	0	0	1	1
5	Pakistan (PAK)	0	0	1	1
Totals (6 entries)		7	7	14	28

== Participating nations ==
- China (12)
- Hong Kong (8)
- India
- Indonesia (12)
- Japan
- Malaysia
- Nepal
- Pakistan
- Philippines
- South Korea
- Thailand

== Semifinal results ==
Discipline	Winner	Runner-up	Score
Men's singles	(China) Han Jian	(Indonesia) Iie Sumirat	15–6, 15–1
Men's singles	(Indonesia) Liem Swie King	(China) Luan Jin	15–5, 18–13
Women's singles	(China) Liang Qiuxia	(Thailand) Sirisriro Patama	12–11, 11–5
Women's singles	(China) Liu Xia	(Japan) Saori Kondo	11–5, 11–4
Men's doubles	(China) Lin Shiquan (China) Tang Xianhu	(Hong Kong) Wong Man Hing (Hong Kong) Fu Han Ping	15–3, 15–5
Men's doubles	(Indonesia) Ade Chandra (Indonesia) Christian Hadinata	(China) Hou Jiachang (China) Yu Yaodong	17–14, 15–7
Women's doubles	(China) Zheng Huiming (China) Qiu Yufang	(Indonesia) Ruth Damyanti (Indonesia) Theresia Widiastuti	15–5, 15–12
Women's doubles	(Indonesia) Imelda Wiguna (Indonesia) Verawaty Wiharjo	(Thailand) Sirisriro Patama (Thailand) Thongkam Kingmanee	15–7, 15–6
Mixed doubles	(Indonesia) Kartono (Indonesia) Theresia Widiastuti	(China) Yu Yaodong (China) Li Fang	15–8, 15–11
Mixed doubles	(China) Tang Xianhu (China) Zhang Ailing	(Indonesia) Christian Hadinata (Indonesia) Imelda Wiguna	12–15, 15–7, 15–5

== Final results ==
Discipline	Winner	Finalist	Score
Men's singles	(Indonesia) Liem Swie King	(China) Han Jian	15–7, 15–11
Women's singles	(China) Liang Qiuxia	(China) Liu Xia	11–6, 11–5
Men's doubles	(Indonesia) Ade Chandra (Indonesia) Christian Hadinata	(China) Lin Shiquan (China) Tang Xianhu	15–8, 15–10
Women's doubles	(Indonesia) Imelda Wiguna (Indonesia) Verawaty Wiharjo	(China) Zheng Huiming (China) Qiu Yufang	17–14, 15–4
Mixed doubles	(China) Tang Xianhu (China) Zhang Ailing	(Indonesia) Kartono (Indonesia) Theresia Widiastuti	15–8, 17–16
Men's team	Indonesia	China	3—1
Women's team	China	Indonesia	3–0
