= Zhang Ailing (badminton) =

Chinese badminton player

Zhang Ailing 张爱玲
Personal information
- Born: 17 December 1957 (age 68) Shanghai, China

Sport
- Country: China
- Sport: Badminton
Medal record
Women's badminton
Representing China
World Championships
Gold medal – first place	1978 Bangkok	Women's singles
Gold medal – first place	1978 Bangkok	Women's doubles
Gold medal – first place	1979 Hangzhou	Women's team
Silver medal – second place	1979 Hangzhou	Women's doubles
Bronze medal – third place	1983 Copenhagen	Women's singles
World Games
Gold medal – first place	1981 Santa Clara	Women's singles
Gold medal – first place	1981 Santa Clara	Women's doubles
World Cup
Silver medal – second place	1983 Kuala Lumpur	Women's singles
Uber Cup
Gold medal – first place	1984 Kuala Lumpur	Women's team
Asian Games
Gold medal – first place	1978 Bangkok	Women's team
Gold medal – first place	1978 Bangkok	Mixed doubles
Gold medal – first place	1982 New Delhi	Women's singles
Gold medal – first place	1982 New Delhi	Women's team
Asian Championships
Bronze medal – third place	1976 Hyderabad	Women's doubles

Zhang Ailing (Chinese: 张爱玲; pinyin: Zhāng Àilíng; born 1957) is a retired badminton player from China.

== Career ==
In 1978 Zhang won women's singles at the rival "world championship" which was run by the short-lived World Badminton Federation prior to China's entry into the International Badminton Federation (now Badminton World Federation). She was the dominant international singles player when China joined the IBF in 1981, winning the multi-sport World Games in 1981, the Asian Games in 1982, and the prestigious All-England Championships in both 1982 and 1983, as well as a host of other significant titles. In the 1983 IBF World Championships, however, she was beaten in the semifinal by Chinese teammate Han Aiping and after this result was unable to regain her previous dominance. Zhang played third singles on China's 1984 Uber Cup (women's international) team which won the team world championship.

As a ramification of her marriage to fellow Chinese player Chen Changjie, she retired from international badminton after the 1983-1984 season due to the policy of "love-banned" in China national badminton squad at that time.

== Achievements ==
=== World Championships ===
Women's singles
Year	Venue	Opponent	Score	Result
1978	Bangkok, Thailand	(Thailand) Sirisriro Patama	11–4, 11–4	Gold
1983	Brøndbyhallen, Copenhagen, Denmark	(China) Han Aiping	7–11, 7–11	Bronze

Women's doubles
Year	Venue	Partner	Opponent	Score	Result
1978	Bangkok, Thailand	(China) Li Fang	(China) Zheng Huiming (China) Qiu Yufang	5–15, 15–9, 15–10	Gold
1979	Hangzhou, China	(China) Liu Xia	(Thailand) Sirisriro Patama (Thailand) Suleeporn Jittariyakul	10–15, 11–15	Silver

=== World Cup ===
Women's singles
Year	Venue	Opponent	Score	Result
1983	Stadium Negara; Kuala Lumpur, Malaysia	(China) Han Aiping	11–6, 5–11, 4–11	Silver

=== World Games ===
Women's singles
Year	Venue	Opponent	Score	Result
1981	San Jose Civic Auditorium, California, United States	(South Korea) Hwang Sun-ai	7–11, 11–9, 12–9	Gold

Women's doubles
Year	Venue	Partner	Opponent	Score	Result
1981	San Jose Civic Auditorium, California, United States	(China) Liu Xia	(England) Jane Webster (England) Nora Perry	11–15, 15–4, 15–8	Gold

=== Asian Games ===
Women's singles
Year	Venue	Opponent	Score	Result
1982	Indraprastha Indoor Stadium; New Delhi, India	(China) Li Lingwei	11–6, 11–8	Gold

Mixed doubles
Year	Venue	Partner	Opponent	Score	Result
1978	Bangkok; Thailand	(China) Tang Xianhu	(Indonesia) Hariamanto Kartono (Indonesia) Theresia Widiastuti	15–8, 17–16	Gold

=== Asian Championships ===
Women's doubles
Year	Venue	Partner	Opponent	Score	Result
1976	Lal Bahadur Shastri Stadium, Hyderabad; India	(China) Liu Xia	(Indonesia) Regina Masli (Indonesia) Theresia Widiastuti	9–15, 8–15	Bronze

=== International tournaments ===
The World Badminton Grand Prix sanctioned by International Badminton Federation (IBF) from 1983 to 2006.

Women's singles
Year	Tournament	Opponent	Score	Result
1981	Scandinavian Cup	(Denmark) Lene Køppen	6–11, 11–12	(silver) Runner-up
1981	English Masters	(Denmark) Lene Køppen	11–6, 11–12, 11–6	(gold) Winner
1982	All England Open	(China) Li Lingwei	11–4, 11–6	(gold) Winner
1983	All England Open	(China) Wu Jianqiu	11–5, 10–12, 12–9	(gold) Winner

Women's doubles
Year	Venue	Partner	Opponent	Score	Result
1981	Scandinavian Cup	(China) Liu Xia	(England) Jane Webster (England) Nora Perry	12–15, 9–15	(silver) Runner-up
1981	English Masters	(China) Liu Xia	(England) Gillian Gilks (Japan) Yoshiko Yonekura	15–10, 3–15, 15–6	(gold) Winner

BWF Grand Prix tournament

=== Invitational tournament ===
Women's singles
Year	Tournament	Opponent	Score	Result
1978	Asian Invitational Championships	(China) Liu Xia	2–11, 7–11	Silver
