= Badminton at the Asian Games =

- Dates: 1958 (demonstration), 1962-present (official)
- Competitors: OCA member competitors from OCA member nations

Badminton has been one of the regular Asian Games sports since 1962 in Jakarta, Indonesia.

== History ==
Badminton made its debut in the Asian Games as a demonstration sport at the 1958 Asian Games in Tokyo, Japan, and became a regular competitive sport in 1962. In the 1962 Games, six events were held, with singles, doubles and team event for both men and women. The mixed doubles event was added in 1966 Asian Games. There was a playoff between the two semifinal losers to determine the sole winner of the bronze medal in 1962; but since 1966, two bronze medals per event are awarded in each event (except in 1974).

== Competition ==
Asian Games badminton consists of a single-elimination tournament. Each match is played to the best of three games, each game is of 21 points. Rally scoring is used, meaning a player does not need to be serving to score. A player must win by two points or be the first player to 30 points.

== Editions ==
Games	Year	Host city	Best nation
4	1962	Jakarta, Indonesia	Indonesia
5	1966	Bangkok, Thailand	Indonesia
6	1970	Bangkok, Thailand	Japan
7	1974	Tehran, Iran	China
8	1978	Bangkok, Thailand	Indonesia
9	1982	New Delhi, India	China
10	1986	Seoul, South Korea	China
11	1990	Beijing, China	China
12	1994	Hiroshima, Japan	South Korea
13	1998	Bangkok, Thailand	China
14	2002	Busan, South Korea	South Korea
15	2006	Doha, Qatar	China
16	2010	Guangzhou, China	China
17	2014	Incheon, South Korea	China
18	2018	Jakarta–Palembang, Indonesia	China
19	2022	Hangzhou, China	China
20	2026	Aichi–Nagoya, Japan	China

== Events ==
Event	62	66	70	74	78	82	86	90	94	98	02	06	10	14	18	22	26	Years
Men's singles	X	X	X	X	X	X	X	X	X	X	X	X	X	X	X	X	X	17
Men's doubles	X	X	X	X	X	X	X	X	X	X	X	X	X	X	X	X	X	17
Men's team	X	X	X	X	X	X	X	X	X	X	X	X	X	X	X	X	X	17
Women's singles	X	X	X	X	X	X	X	X	X	X	X	X	X	X	X	X	X	17
Women's doubles	X	X	X	X	X	X	X	X	X	X	X	X	X	X	X	X	X	17
Women's team	X	X	X	X	X	X	X	X	X	X	X	X	X	X	X	X	X	17
Mixed doubles		X	X	X	X	X	X	X	X	X	X	X	X	X	X	X	X	16
Total	6	7	7	7	7	7	7	7	7	7	7	7	7	7	7	7	7	118

== Participating nations ==
Nation	62	66	70	74	78	82	86	90	94	98	02	06	10	14	18	22	26	Years
Afghanistan														2	2			2
Bahrain												2					1	2
Bangladesh																	5	1
Bhutan																2		1
Cambodia	X								3	2						2		4
China				12	12	12	16	16	16	16	19	16	20	20	20	20	20	14
Chinese Taipei		X							8	16	4	9	20	20	20	20	20	10
Timor-Leste											2	2				3		3
Hong Kong		4	8	6	8	6	6	8	8	10	10	13	12	18	20	20	20	16
India				X	X	X	12			1	2	10	17	15	20	19	20	12
Indonesia	10	X	X	X	X	12	14	16	16	16	12	16	20	18	20	20	20	17
Iran				X						4		2		2	2	2	2	7
Iraq													1					1
Japan	X	X	X	X	X	X	11	12	16	11	11	11	16	20	20	20	20	17
Jordan																1		1
Kazakhstan																2	9	2
Laos																	2	1
Macau											2	4	6	10	4	6	6	7
Malaysia	10	X	X	X	X	X	7	7	9	16	17	16	18	20	14	18	20	17
Maldives									4				3	8	8	8	4	6
Mongolia											4	2	4	4	4	13	16	7
Myanmar		X																1
Nepal		X	X	X	X		8					1	5	8	8	8	4	11
North Korea				X				6									2	3
Pakistan				X	X		2	6		2				4	8	4	2	9
Philippines	X	X	X	X	X					4	1	2						8
Qatar														1				1
Saudi Arabia															2			1
Singapore	X								3		2	12	2	6		13	4	8
South Korea		X	X	X	X	X	16	16	16	16	20	16	20	20	20	20	20	16
Sri Lanka		X					1	2		2	1	4	4		6	1	3	10
Syria											1	4						2
Tajikistan																	2	1
Thailand	9	X	X	X	X	X	5	12	13	16	12	16	20	20	20	20	20	17
Vietnam												4	2	5	6	4	6	6
Number of nations	7	11	8	13	11		11	10	11	14	16	20	17	19	19	23	24	
Number of athletes							98	101	112	132	120	162	190	221	224	246	248	

== Winners ==
Year	Men's singles	Women's singles	Men's doubles	Women's doubles	Mixed doubles	Men's team	Women's team
1962	(Indonesia) Tan Joe Hok	(Indonesia) Minarni	(Federation of Malaya) Ng Boon Bee (Federation of Malaya) Tan Yee Khan	(Indonesia) Minarni (Indonesia) Retno Kustijah	not conducted	Indonesia	Indonesia
1966	(Indonesia) Ang Tjin Siang	(Japan) Noriko Takagi	(Malaysia) Ng Boon Bee (Malaysia) Tan Yee Khan	(Indonesia) Minarni (Indonesia) Retno Kustijah	(Malaysia) Teh Kew San (Malaysia) Rosalind Singha Ang	Thailand	Japan
1970	(Malaysia) Punch Gunalan	(Japan) Hiroe Yuki	(Malaysia) Ng Boon Bee (Malaysia) Punch Gunalan	(Japan) Etsuko Takenaka (Japan) Machiko Aizawa	(Malaysia) Ng Boon Bee (Malaysia) Sylvia Ng	Indonesia	Japan
1974	(China) Hou Jiachang	(China) Chen Yuniang	(Indonesia) Tjun Tjun (Indonesia) Johan Wahjudi	(China) Liang Qiuxia (China) Zheng Huiming	(Indonesia) Christian Hadinata (Indonesia) Regina Masli	China	China
1978	(Indonesia) Liem Swie King	(China) Liang Qiuxia	(Indonesia) Ade Chandra (Indonesia) Christian Hadinata	(Indonesia) Verawaty Wiharjo (Indonesia) Imelda Wiguna	(China) Tang Xianhu (China) Zhang Ailing	Indonesia	China
1982	(China) Han Jian	(China) Zhang Ailing	(Indonesia) Icuk Sugiarto (Indonesia) Christian Hadinata	(South Korea) Hwang Sun-ai (South Korea) Kang Haeng-suk	(Indonesia) Christian Hadinata (Indonesia) Ivana Lie	China	China
1986	(China) Zhao Jianhua	(China) Han Aiping	(South Korea) Park Joo-bong (South Korea) Kim Moon-soo	(China) Lin Ying (China) Guan Weizhen	(South Korea) Park Joo-bong (South Korea) Chung Myung-hee	South Korea	China
1990	(China) Zhao Jianhua	(China) Tang Jiuhong	(China) Li Yongbo (China) Tian Bingyi	(China) Guan Weizhen (China) Nong Qunhua	(South Korea) Park Joo-bong (South Korea) Chung Myung-hee	China	China
1994	(Indonesia) Hariyanto Arbi	(South Korea) Bang Soo-hyun	(Indonesia) Rexy Mainaky (Indonesia) Ricky Subagja	(South Korea) Shim Eun-jung (South Korea) Jang Hye-ock	(South Korea) Yoo Yong-sung (South Korea) Chung So-young	Indonesia	South Korea
1998	(China) Dong Jiong	(Japan) Kanako Yonekura	(Indonesia) Rexy Mainaky (Indonesia) Ricky Subagja	(China) Ge Fei (China) Gu Jun	(South Korea) Kim Dong-moon (South Korea) Ra Kyung-min	Indonesia	China
2002	(Indonesia) Taufik Hidayat	(China) Zhou Mi	(South Korea) Lee Dong-soo (South Korea) Yoo Yong-sung	(South Korea) Ra Kyung-min (South Korea) Lee Kyung-won	(South Korea) Kim Dong-moon (South Korea) Ra Kyung-min	South Korea	China
2006	(Indonesia) Taufik Hidayat	(Hong Kong) Wang Chen	(Malaysia) Koo Kien Keat (Malaysia) Tan Boon Heong	(China) Gao Ling (China) Huang Sui	(China) Zheng Bo (China) Gao Ling	China	China
2010	(China) Lin Dan	(China) Wang Shixian	(Indonesia) Markis Kido (Indonesia) Hendra Setiawan	(China) Tian Qing (China) Zhao Yunlei	(South Korea) Shin Baek-cheol (South Korea) Lee Hyo-jung	China	China
2014	(China) Lin Dan	(China) Wang Yihan	(Indonesia) Mohammad Ahsan (Indonesia) Hendra Setiawan	(Indonesia) Nitya Krishinda Maheswari (Indonesia) Greysia Polii	(China) Zhang Nan (China) Zhao Yunlei	South Korea	China
2018	(Indonesia) Jonatan Christie	(Chinese Taipei) Tai Tzu-ying	(Indonesia) Marcus Fernaldi Gideon (Indonesia) Kevin Sanjaya Sukamuljo	(China) Chen Qingchen (China) Jia Yifan	(China) Zheng Siwei (China) Huang Yaqiong	China	Japan
2022	(China) Li Shifeng	(South Korea) An Se-young	(India) Satwiksairaj Rankireddy (India) Chirag Shetty	(China) Chen Qingchen (China) Jia Yifan	(China) Zheng Siwei (China) Huang Yaqiong	China	South Korea
2026	(Thailand) Kunlavut Vitidsarn	(South Korea) An Se-young	(Indonesia) Leo Rolly Carnando (Indonesia) Daniel Marthin	(South Korea) Baek Ha-na (South Korea) Lee So-hee	(China) Jiang Zhenbang (China) Wei Yaxin	Indonesia	China

== Performance by nations ==
Pos	Nation	MS	WS	MD	WD	XD*	MT	WT	Total
1	China	8	8	1	8	6	7	11	49
2	Indonesia	7	1	9	4	2	6	1	30
3	South Korea	0	3	2	4	6	3	2	20
4	Malaysia	1	0	4	0	2	0	0	7
4	Japan	0	3	0	1	0	0	3	7
6	Thailand	1	0	0	0	0	1	0	2
7	Chinese Taipei	0	1	0	0	0	0	0	1
7	India	0	0	1	0	0	0	0	1
7	Hong Kong	0	1	0	0	0	0	0	1
Total		17	17	17	17	16	17	17	118

Notes: The table above shows number of gold medals won by countries. At the 1962 Asian Games, mixed doubles discipline wasn't conducted, so the number of gold medals aren't equal with others disciplines.

== Medal table ==
As of 2026 edition

Rank	Nation	Gold	Silver	Bronze	Total
1	China (CHN)	49	35	40	124
2	Indonesia (INA)	30	28	47	105
3	South Korea (KOR)	20	19	39	78
4	Japan (JPN)	7	11	31	49
5	Malaysia (MAS)	7	8	22	37
6	Thailand (THA)	2	11	17	30
7	India (IND)	1	2	11	14
8	Hong Kong (HKG)	1	2	5	8
9	Chinese Taipei (TPE)	1	1	8	10
10	Singapore (SGP)	0	1	1	2
11	Myanmar (MYA)	0	0	1	1
11	Pakistan (PAK)	0	0	1	1
Totals (12 entries)		118	118	223	459
