= Badminton at the 1974 Asian Games =

- Venue: Amjadieh Sport Complex
- Dates: 1–16 September

Badminton competitions for The 1974 Asian Games were held in Amjadieh Sport Complex, Tehran, Iran. This is for the first time that Chinese players have been allowed by the International Badminton Federation to compete in an official badminton tournament. In both the men's and women's team finals, debutant China defeated Indonesia by 3–2.

== Medal summary ==
=== Medal table ===
Rank	Nation	Gold	Silver	Bronze	Total
1	China (CHN)	5	3	2	10
2	Indonesia (INA)	2	4	2	8
3	Japan (JPN)	0	0	2	2
4	India (IND)	0	0	1	1
Totals (4 entries)		7	7	7	21

=== Medalists ===
Event	Gold	Silver	Bronze
Men's singles	Hou Jiachang; China	Fang Kaixiang; China	Liem Swie King; Indonesia
Men's doubles	Indonesia; Tjun Tjun; Johan Wahjudi	Indonesia; Christian Hadinata; Ade Chandra	China; Tang Xianhu; Chen Tianxiang
Men's team	China; Chen Tianxiang; Chen Xinhui; Fang Kaixiang; Hou Jiachang; Tang Xianhu; Yu Yaodong	Indonesia; Ade Chandra; Christian Hadinata; Liem Swie King; Nunung Murdjianto; Tjun Tjun; Johan Wahjudi	India; Davinder Ahuja; Partho Ganguli; Raman Ghosh; Dinesh Khanna; Prakash Padukone
Women's singles	Chen Yuniang; China	Liang Qiuxia; China	Hiroe Yuki; Japan
Women's doubles	China; Liang Qiuxia; Zheng Huiming	China; Lin Youya; Qiu Yufang	Indonesia; Theresia Widiastuti; Imelda Wiguna
Women's team	China; Chen Yuniang; Liang Qiuxia; Liu Xiaozheng; Lin Youya; Qiu Yufang; Zheng Huiming	Indonesia; Regina Masli; Minarni; Taty Sumirah; Theresia Widiastuti; Imelda Wiguna; Sri Wiyanti	Japan; Machiko Aizawa; Mika Ikeda; Mariko Nishio; Etsuko Takenaka; Hiroe Yuki
Mixed doubles	Indonesia; Christian Hadinata; Regina Masli	Indonesia; Tjun Tjun; Sri Wiyanti	China; Tang Xianhu; Chen Yuniang

== Results ==
=== Men's singles ===
1st round – September 11
	Score		Set 1	Set 2	Set 3
Liem Swie King (INA)	2–0	Joo Ryon-chang (PRK)	15–8	15–4	
Hassan Shaheed (PAK)	0–2	Yoshitaka Iino (JPN)	5–15	2–15	
Yan Po Tim (HKG)	2–0	Danny So (PHI)	15–9	15–9	
Moo Foot Lian (MAL)	2–1	Dinesh Khanna (IND)	15–11	7–15	15–6
Dariush Foroughi (IRN)	0–2	Yang Mei Liang (HKG)	2–15	7–15	
Tan Aik Mong (MAL)	2–0	Kim Yong-do (PRK)	15–8	15–6	
Masao Tsuchida (JPN)	2–0	Conrado Co (PHI)	15–3	15–5	
Sangob Rattanusorn (THA)	0–2	Nunung Murdjianto (INA)	8–15	1–15	

2nd round September 11
Hou Jiachang (CHN)	15	15
Sirous Aflatoun (IRN)	4	3
Kishore Singh (NEP)	2	5
Bandid Jaiyen (THA)	15	15
Liem Swie King (INA)	15	10	15
Yoshitaka Iino (JPN)	9	15	3
Yan Po Tim (HKG)	12	17
Moo Foot Lian (MAL)	15	18
Yang Mei Liang (HKG)	3	10
Tan Aik Mong (MAL)	15	15
Masao Tsuchida (JPN)	5	11
Nunung Murdjianto (INA)	15	15
Davinder Ahuja (IND)	15	15
Prem Pandey (NEP)	3	3
Javed Iqbal (PAK)	5	11
Fang Kaixiang (CHN)	15	15

Quarterfinals; September 12
Hou Jiachang (CHN)	18	15
Bandid Jaiyen (THA)	14	5
Liem Swie King (INA)	15	15
Moo Foot Lian (MAL)	9	4
Tan Aik Mong (MAL)	8	18	15
Nunung Murdjianto (INA)	15	15	6
Davinder Ahuja (IND)	2	10
Fang Kaixiang (CHN)	15	15

Semifinals; September 13
Hou Jiachang (CHN)	15	15
Liem Swie King (INA)	8	7
Tan Aik Mong (MAL)	8	5
Fang Kaixiang (CHN)	15	15

Final; September 14
Hou Jiachang (CHN)	15	15
Fang Kaixiang (CHN)	12	11
Bronze medal match
Liem Swie King (INA)	15	15
Tan Aik Mong (MAL)	12	10

=== Men's doubles ===
1st round – September 11
	Score		Set 1	Set 2	Set 3
Tang Xianhu (CHN); Chen Tianxiang (CHN)	2–0	Joo Ryon-chang (PRK); Kim Jung-kook (PRK)	15–7	15–4	
Mohsen Sheida (IRN); Sadra Shoushtari (IRN)	WO	Hauw Fan Chang (HKG); Wong Man Hing (HKG)			
Bandid Jaiyen (THA); Sangob Rattanusorn (THA)	2–0	Abdul Hamid (PAK); Tariq Wadood (PAK)	15–1	15–5	
Butch Oreta (PHI); Daniel Buenaventura (PHI)	0–2	Kishore Singh (NEP); Prem Pandey (NEP)	15–18	16–18	
Yang Mei Liang (HKG); Chen Kok Ming (HKG)	0–2	Hassan Shaheed (PAK); Javed Iqbal (PAK)	7–15	7–15	
Ashok Ratna (NEP); Uday Kumar Shrestha (NEP)	0–2	Kim Yong-do (PRK); Bak Ok-nyon (PRK)	0–15	1–15	
Shoichi Toganoo (JPN); Nobutaka Ikeda (JPN)	2–0	Danny So (PHI); Conrado Co (PHI)	15–9	15–9	

2nd round September 12
Tang Xianhu (CHN); Chen Tianxiang (CHN)	15	15
Mohsen Sheida (IRN); Sadra Shoushtari (IRN)	5	6
Bandid Jaiyen (THA); Sangob Rattanusorn (THA)	18	18
Kishore Singh (NEP); Prem Pandey (NEP)	15	16
Christian Hadinata (INA); Ade Chandra (INA)	15	15
Yoshitaka Iino (JPN); Masao Tsuchida (JPN)	12	10
Moo Foot Lian (MAL); Dominic Soong (MAL)	15	13	11
Partho Ganguli (IND); Davinder Ahuja (IND)	6	15	15
Dinesh Khanna (IND); Raman Ghosh (IND)
Sirous Aflatoun (IRN); Dariush Foroughi (IRN)	W	O
Pornchai Sakuntaniyom (THA); Preecha Sopajaree (THA)	6	8
Tjun Tjun (INA); Johan Wahjudi (INA)	15	15
Hassan Shaheed (PAK); Javed Iqbal (PAK)	15	15
Kim Yong-do (PRK); Bak Ok-nyon (PRK)	1	7
Shoichi Toganoo (JPN); Nobutaka Ikeda (JPN)	17	5	15
Yu Yaodong (CHN); Chen Xinhui (CHN)	14	15	10

Quarterfinals; September 12
Tang Xianhu (CHN); Chen Tianxiang (CHN)	15	15
Bandid Jaiyen (THA); Sangob Rattanusorn (THA)	9	4
Christian Hadinata (INA); Ade Chandra (INA)	15	15
Partho Ganguli (IND); Davinder Ahuja (IND)	2	2
Sirous Aflatoun (IRN); Dariush Foroughi (IRN)	0	2
Tjun Tjun (INA); Johan Wahjudi (INA)	15	15
Hassan Shaheed (PAK); Javed Iqbal (PAK)	16	6
Shoichi Toganoo (JPN); Nobutaka Ikeda (JPN)	17	15

Semifinals; September 13
Tang Xianhu (CHN); Chen Tianxiang (CHN)	8	15	8
Christian Hadinata (INA); Ade Chandra (INA)	15	13	15
Tjun Tjun (INA); Johan Wahjudi (INA)	15	15
Shoichi Toganoo (JPN); Nobutaka Ikeda (JPN)	0	4

Final; September 14
Christian Hadinata (INA); Ade Chandra (INA)	9	7
Tjun Tjun (INA); Johan Wahjudi (INA)	15	15
Bronze medal match
Tang Xianhu (CHN); Chen Tianxiang (CHN)	15	15
Shoichi Toganoo (JPN); Nobutaka Ikeda (JPN)	2	3

=== Women's singles ===
1st round September 11
Chen Yuniang (CHN)	11	11
Bak Yon-ok (PRK)	3	1
Mariko Nishio (JPN)	11	2	3
Sylvia Ng (MAL)	6	11	11
Sri Wiyanti (INA)	11	11
Sirisriro Patama (THA)	6	1
Mina Pourghobadi (IRN)	0	0
Oh Youn-han (KOR)	11	11
Talat Sultana (PAK)	0	7
Ok Bok-eun (KOR)	11	11
Hiroe Yuki (JPN)	11	11
Taty Sumirah (INA)	6	5
Rafat Yazdanparast (IRN)	0	0
Bak Jung-sook (PRK)	11	11
Thongkam Kingmanee (THA)	5	6
Liang Qiuxia (CHN)	11	11

Quarterfinals; September 12
Chen Yuniang (CHN)	11	11
Sylvia Ng (MAL)	9	2
Sri Wiyanti (INA)	5	11	8
Oh Youn-han (KOR)	11	6	11
Ok Bok-eun (KOR)	11	7	4
Hiroe Yuki (JPN)	7	11	11
Bak Jung-sook (PRK)	3	3
Liang Qiuxia (CHN)	11	11

Semifinals; September 13
Chen Yuniang (CHN)	11	11
Oh Youn-han (KOR)	5	2
Hiroe Yuki (JPN)	1	2
Liang Qiuxia (CHN)	11	11

Final; September 14
Chen Yuniang (CHN)	11	11
Liang Qiuxia (CHN)	8	7
Bronze medal match
Oh Youn-han (KOR)	4	2
Hiroe Yuki (JPN)	11	11

=== Women's doubles ===
1st round September 11
Liang Qiuxia (CHN); Zheng Huiming (CHN)	15	15
Houri Farshian (IRN); Mina Pourghobadi (IRN)	1	2
Thongkam Kingmanee (THA); Sirisriro Patama (THA)	15	15
Bak Yon-ok (PRK); Bak Jung-sook (PRK)	7	5
Theresia Widiastuti (INA); Imelda Wiguna (INA)	9	15	18
Ok Bok-eun (KOR); Song Hyang-soong (KOR)	15	11	16
Ri Hyo-bong (PRK); So He-soon (PRK)	4	9
Hiroe Yuki (JPN); Mika Ikeda (JPN)	15	15
Oh Youn-han (KOR); Park Ok-young (KOR)	7	5
Minarni (INA); Regina Masli (INA)	15	15
Sylvia Ng (MAL); Rosalind Singha Ang (MAL)	15	15
Behnaz Nourazar (IRN); Rafat Yazdanparast (IRN)	1	1

Quarterfinals; September 12
Liang Qiuxia (CHN); Zheng Huiming (CHN)	15	15
Thongkam Kingmanee (THA); Sirisriro Patama (THA)	1	11
Etsuko Takenaka (JPN); Machiko Aizawa (JPN)	8	16
Theresia Widiastuti (INA); Imelda Wiguna (INA)	15	18
Hiroe Yuki (JPN); Mika Ikeda (JPN)	12	9
Minarni (INA); Regina Masli (INA)	15	15
Sylvia Ng (MAL); Rosalind Singha Ang (MAL)	8	8
Lin Youya (CHN); Qiu Yufang (CHN)	15	15

Semifinals; September 13
Liang Qiuxia (CHN); Zheng Huiming (CHN)	15	15
Theresia Widiastuti (INA); Imelda Wiguna (INA)	12	8
Minarni (INA); Regina Masli (INA)	7	15
Lin Youya (CHN); Qiu Yufang (CHN)	15	18

Final; September 14
Liang Qiuxia (CHN); Zheng Huiming (CHN)	15	15
Lin Youya (CHN); Qiu Yufang (CHN)	10	12
Bronze medal match
Theresia Widiastuti (INA); Imelda Wiguna (INA)
Minarni (INA); Regina Masli (INA)

=== Mixed doubles ===
Final

Winner	Runner-up	Score
(Indonesia) Christian Hadinata (Indonesia) Regina Masli	(Indonesia) Tjun Tjun (Indonesia) Sri Wiyanti	15–10, 15–8

Bronze medal match

Winner	Runner-up	Score
(China) Tang Xianhu (China) Chen Yuniang	(Thailand) Sakuntaniyom Pornchai (Thailand) Kingmanee Thongkam	15–12, 15–9
