= Regina Masli =

Indonesian badminton player

Sport
- Sport: Badminton
Medal record
Women's badminton
Representing Indonesia
Uber Cup
Gold medal – first place	1975 Jakarta	Women's team
Silver medal – second place	1972 Tokyo	Women's team
Silver medal – second place	1978 Auckland	Women's team
Asian Games
Gold medal – first place	1974 Tehran	Mixed doubles
Silver medal – second place	1974 Tehran	Women's team]]
Asian Championships
Gold medal – first place	1976 Hyderabad	Women's Doubles
Silver medal – second place	1971 Jakarta	Women's doubles

Regina Masli born 1940, is an Indonesian badminton player in the 70s.

== Profile ==
Masli played a decisive role in Indonesia's historic first Uber Cup triumph in 1975 in Jakarta. At 34-35 years old, she was the most senior player in the Indonesian squad that included Utami Dewi, Theresia Widiastuti, Imelda Wiguna, Minarni Soedaryanto, and Taty Sumirah. In the final against defending champions Japan who had dominated the Uber Cup since its inception Indonesia won 5-2. Masli contributed two crucial points partnering with Minarni, defeating the Japanese women's doubles pairs and breaking Japan's 18 year unbeaten streak. That victory marked the first time Indonesia lifted the Uber Cup.

Her peak in individual events came at the 1974 Asian Games in Tehran. Partnering with Christian Hadinata, she won the gold medal in mixed doubles, defeating fellow Indonesians Tjun Tjun and Sri Wiyanti in an all-Indonesian final 15–10, 15–8. At the same Games, she also helped the Indonesian women's team alongside Minarni, Taty Sumirah, Theresia Widiastuti, Imelda Wiguna, and Sri Wiyanti win the silver medal, losing 3-2 to China in the final.

Beyond the Uber Cup and Asian Games, Masli built a distinguished record on the international circuit throughout the 1970s. She became the women's doubles champion at the 1976 Asian Championships in Hyderabad with Theresia Widiastuti, a title that confirmed Indonesia's dominance in the region after their Uber Cup win. Two years earlier, at the 1974 World Invitational Championships, she achieved a double triumph by winning gold in women's doubles with Minarni and another gold in mixed doubles with Christian Hadinata. Her versatility was also evident in open tournaments. She captured the Singapore Open women's doubles title in 1972 with Intan Nurtjahja and went on to win the mixed doubles title at the same event in 1972 with Johan Wahjudi and again in 1975 with Tjun Tjun. She further added a prestigious European title by winning the mixed doubles at the 1975 Denmark Open alongside Tjun Tjun. Earlier in her career, before establishing her famous partnerships, she had partnered with Poppy Tumengkol to win a silver medal at the 1971 Asian Championships in Jakarta.

With a career spanning from the late 1960s to the late 1970s, Masli represented Indonesia in three Uber Cup campaigns in 1972, 1975, and 1978, and was part of the pioneering generation that paved the way for later Indonesian doubles legends.

== Achievements ==
=== Asian Games ===
Mixed doubles
Year	Venue	Partner	Opponent	Score	Result	Ref.
1974	Amjadieh Sport Complex, Tehran, Iran	(Indonesia) Christian Hadinata	(Indonesia) Tjun Tjun (Indonesia) Sri Wiyanti	15–10, 15–8	Gold	

=== Asian Championships ===
Women's doubles
Year	Venue	Partner	Opponent	Score	Result	Ref.
1971	Istora Senayan, Jakarta, Indonesia	(Indonesia) Poppy Tumengkol	(Indonesia) Retno Kustijah (Indonesia) Intan Nurtjahja	13–15, 6–15	Silver	
1976	Lal Bahadur Shastri Stadium, Hyderabad, India	(Indonesia) Theresia Widiastuti	(China) Liang Qiuxia (China) He Cuiling	15–8, 17–18, 15–6	Gold	

=== International tournaments (3 titles) ===
Women's doubles
Year	Tournament	Partner	Opponent	Score	Result	Ref.
1972	Singapore Open	(Indonesia) Intan Nurtjahja	(Indonesia) Taty Sumirah (Indonesia) Poppy Tumengkol	15–4, 10–15, 15–10	(gold) Winner	

Mixed doubles
Year	Tournament	Partner	Opponent	Score	Result	Ref.
1972	Singapore Open	(Indonesia) Johan Wahjudi	(Thailand) Chirasak Champakao (Singapore) Liem Siew Choo	15–11, 15–7	(gold) Winner	
1975	Denmark Open	(Indonesia) Tjun Tjun	(Denmark) Klaus Kaagaard (Netherlands) Joke van Beusekom	15–6, 7–15, 17–14	(gold) Winner	

=== Invitational tournaments ===
Women's doubles
Year	Tournament	Partner	Opponent	Score	Result	Ref.
1974	World Invitational Championships	(Indonesia) Minarni	(Netherlands) Joke van Beusekom (Denmark) Lene Køppen	15–7, 15–8	Gold	

Mixed doubles
Year	Tournament	Partner	Opponent	Score	Result	Ref.
1974	World Invitational Championships	(Indonesia) Christian Hadinata	(Indonesia) Tjun Tjun (Indonesia) Sri Wiyanti	15–7, 15–3	Gold	
1975	World Invitational Championships	(Indonesia) Christian Hadinata	(Denmark) Elo Hansen (Malaysia) Sylvia Ng	15–7, 15–5	Gold	
