= 1978 Asian Invitational Badminton Championships =

Badminton championships

Tournament details
- Dates: 15 – 25 April
- Edition: 3
- Venue: Capital Indoor Stadium
- Location: Peking, People's Republic of China

The 1978 Asian Invitational Badminton Championships which was the third edition of Asian Invitational Championships took place in the month of April in Peking, People's Republic of China.

== Description ==
This Asian tourney was originally decided to be held in Singapore but was later given to China. Tournament organised junior events as well which included Boys' singles & doubles as well as Girls' singles and doubles. Mixed doubles competitions were as usual not conducted. A total of 12 countries took part in this event which were China, India, Singapore, Iran, Japan, Malaysia, Indonesia, Hong Kong, Philippines, Thailand, Sri Lanka and Pakistan.

At the end of day, China won all the disciplines except Women's doubles doubles which was won by Thailand. Gold medals for Junior events were shared between Amy Chan of Hong Kong who won Girls' singles event, He Shangquan of China who won Boys' singles, Tay Hoe See & Judy Lee of Singapore who won Girls' doubles and the combination of Maung Maung & Win Mar of Burma who won the Boys' doubles discipline.

== Medalists ==
Discipline	Gold	Silver	Bronze
Men's singles	(China) Yu Yaodong	(China) Chen Tianlong	(China) Luan Jin
Women's singles	(China) Liu Xia	(China) Zhang Ailing	(China) Xu Rong
Men's doubles	(China) Lin Shiquan (China) Tang Xianhu	(India) Syed Modi (India) Prakash Padukone	(Pakistan) Javed Iqbal (Pakistan) Tariq Wadood
Women's doubles	(Thailand) Thongkam Kingmanee (Thailand) Sirisriro Patama	(China) Xu Rong (China) Yu Jianghong	

== Men's singles ==
Semifinal
(China) Yu Yaodong
(China) Luan Jin
(Malaysia) Saw Swee Leong
(China) Chen Tianlong

Final
(China) Yu Yaodong	12	15	15
(China) Chen Tianlong	15	13	10
Third place
(China) Luan Jin	15	15
(Malaysia) Saw Swee Leong	9	8

== Women's singles ==
Semifinal
(China) Liu Xia	11	11
(China) Xu Rong	5	0
(China) Yu Jianghong	4	9
(China) Zhang Ailing	11	12

Final
(China) Liu Xia	11	11
(China) Zhang Ailing	2	7
Third place
(China) Xu Rong	11	11
(China) Yu Jianghong	5	8

== Men's doubles ==
Semi-finals
(China) Lin Shiquan (China) Tang Xianhu	15	15
(Pakistan) Javed Iqbal (Pakistan) Tariq Wadood	12	8
(Singapore) Kok Peng Hon (Singapore) Tan Eng Han	10	5
(India) Syed Modi (India) Prakash Padukone	15	15

Final
(China) Lin Shiquan (China) Tang Xianhu	15	15
(India) Syed Modi (India) Prakash Padukone	3	5
Third place
(Pakistan) Javed Iqbal (Pakistan) Tariq Wadood	15	9	18
(Singapore) Kok Peng Hon (Singapore) Tan Eng Han	9	15	13

== Women's doubles ==
- Bronze medal winners unknown

Semi-finals
(Thailand) Thongkam Kingmanee (Thailand) Sirisriro Patama	15	15
(Singapore) Peh Ah Bee (China) Zhang Ailing	8	12
(Sri Lanka) Nirmala Wickramatilaka (China) Liu Xia	8	12
(China) Xu Rong (China) Yu Jianghong	15	15

Final
(Thailand) Thongkam Kingmanee (Thailand) Sirisriro Patama	15	15
(China) Xu Rong (China) Yu Jianghong	9	12
Third place
(Sri Lanka) Nirmala Wickramatilaka (China) Liu Xia
(Singapore) Peh Ah Bee (China) Zhang Ailing
