= Liang Qiuxia =

Chinese badminton player

Liang Qiuxia 梁秋霞
Personal information
- Born: 9 September 1950 (age 76) Cirebon, West Java, Indonesia

Sport
- Country: China
- Sport: Badminton
- Handedness: Right
Medal record
Women's badminton
Representing China
Asian Games
Gold medal – first place	1974 Tehran	Women's doubles
Gold medal – first place	1978 Bangkok	Women's singles
Gold medal – first place	1978 Bangkok	Women's team
Gold medal – first place	1974 Tehran	Women's team
Silver medal – second place	1974 Tehran	Women's singles
Asian Championships
Gold medal – first place	1976 Hyderabad	Women's singles
Silver medal – second place	1976 Hyderabad	Women's doubles

Liang Qiuxia (Chinese: 梁秋霞 W.-G. Liang Chiu Hsia, born, Cirebon, West Java; 9 September 1950) is a former badminton player representing China, after migrating from Indonesia. She is also the sister of 6 time All-England Men Doubles Champion, Tjun Tjun, who represented Indonesia.

Liang Qiuxia was one of the most important Chinese badminton players of the 1970s. During this era China belonged to the WBF, which it sponsored, and the larger IBF, so that Liang Qiuxia could rarely compete with the best of the world. In 1974 she won silver in the Asian Games in Women's Singles and Gold in Women's Doubles with Cheng Huiming. In 1976, she became Asian champion, and in 1978 she once again won the Asian Games in the women's singles. After her active career, she became a coach of the Indonesian national team, coaching Olympic champion and one of the all-time greats Susi Susanti.

== Major achievements in badminton ==
Tournament	Event	Year	Result
Badminton at the 1974 Asian Games	Women's Doubles	1974	Champion
Badminton at the 1974 Asian Games	Women's Singles	1974	Silver Medal
Chinese National Badminton Championships	Women's Doubles	1975	Champion
Badminton Asia Championships	Women's Singles	1976	Champion
Badminton at the 1978 Asian Games	Women's Singles	1978	Champion
