= Lal Bahadur Shastri Stadium, Hyderabad =

Cricket field in India

Coordinates: 17°23′57.6″N 78°28′24.0″E

LB Stadium
- Fateh Maidan
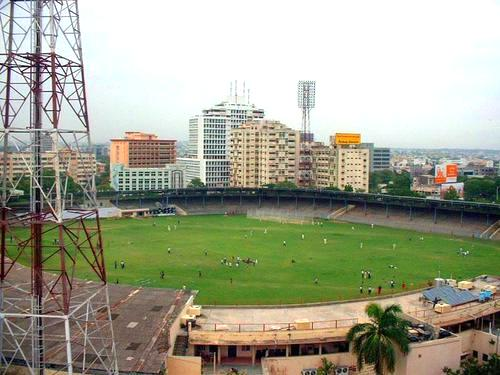
- View of Lal Bahadur Shastri Stadium
- Interactive map of LB Stadium

Ground information
- Location: Hyderabad, Telangana, India
- Country: India
- Establishment: 1950; 76 years ago
- Capacity: 30,000
- Owner: Sports Authority of Telangana
- Operator: Sports Authority of Telangana
- Tenants: Fateh Hyderabad F.C.
- End names
- Pavilion End; Hill Fort End

International information
- First men's Test: 19 November, 1955: India v New Zealand
- Last men's Test: 2 December, 1988: India v New Zealand
- First men's ODI: 10 September, 1983: India v Pakistan
- Last men's ODI: 19 November, 2003: India v New Zealand
- Only women's Test: 10–13 December 1995: India v England
- First women's ODI: 8 January 1978: England v New Zealand
- Last women's ODI: 13 December 2003: India v New Zealand
- As of 10 December 2019; Source: Lal Bahadur Shastri Stadium, ESPNcricinfo

The Lal Bahadur Shastri Stadium, formerly known as Fateh Maidan, is a multi-purpose sports stadium in Hyderabad, Telangana. The stadium is primarily used for cricket and association football.

The stadium was renamed in 1967 in memory of Lal Bahadur Shastri, India's former Prime Minister. As of 19 August 2017, it has hosted 3 cricket Tests and 14 ODIs.

== History ==
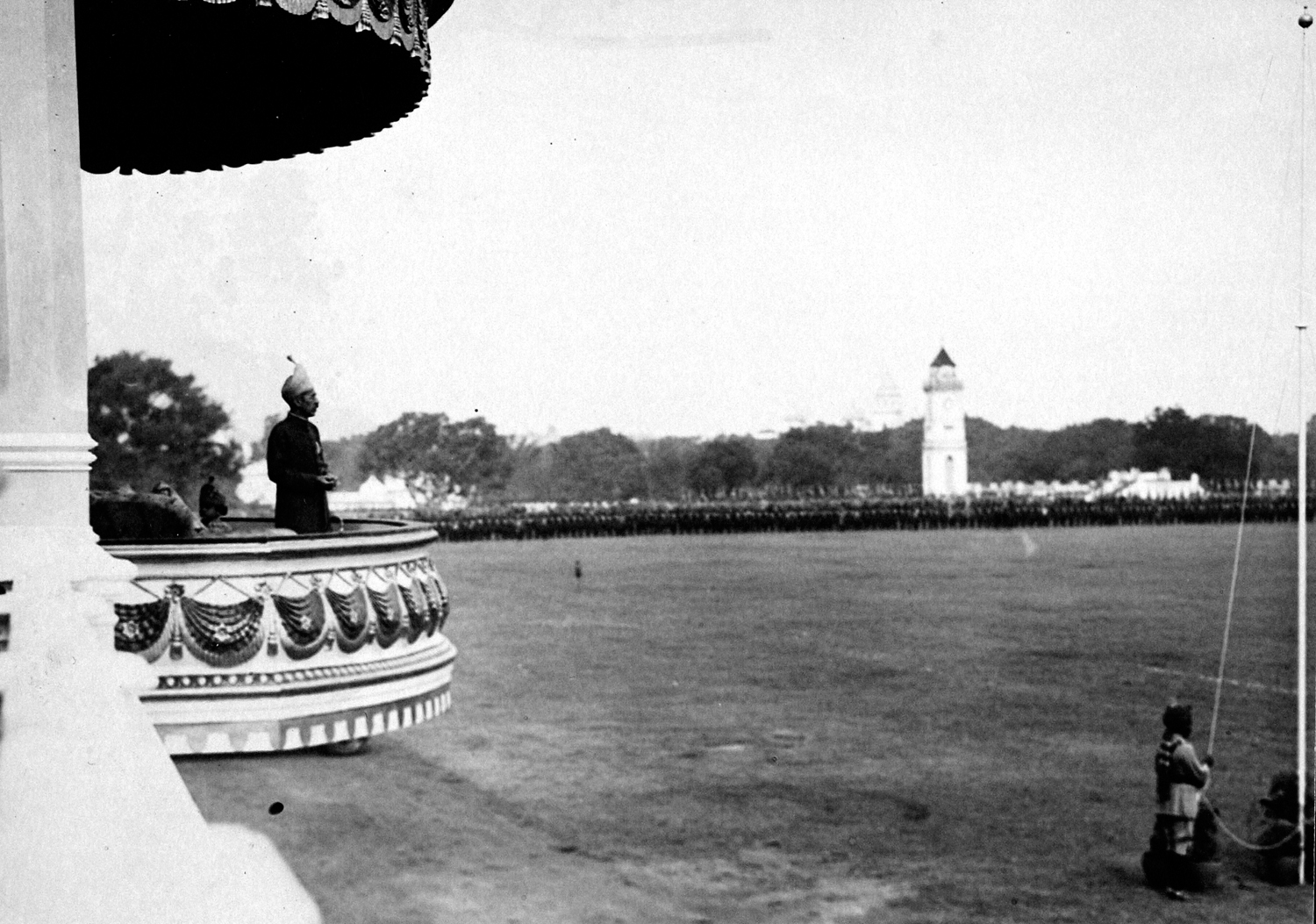
Mir Osman Ali Khan, Asaf Jah VII at the grandstand of Fateh Maidan in 1930s

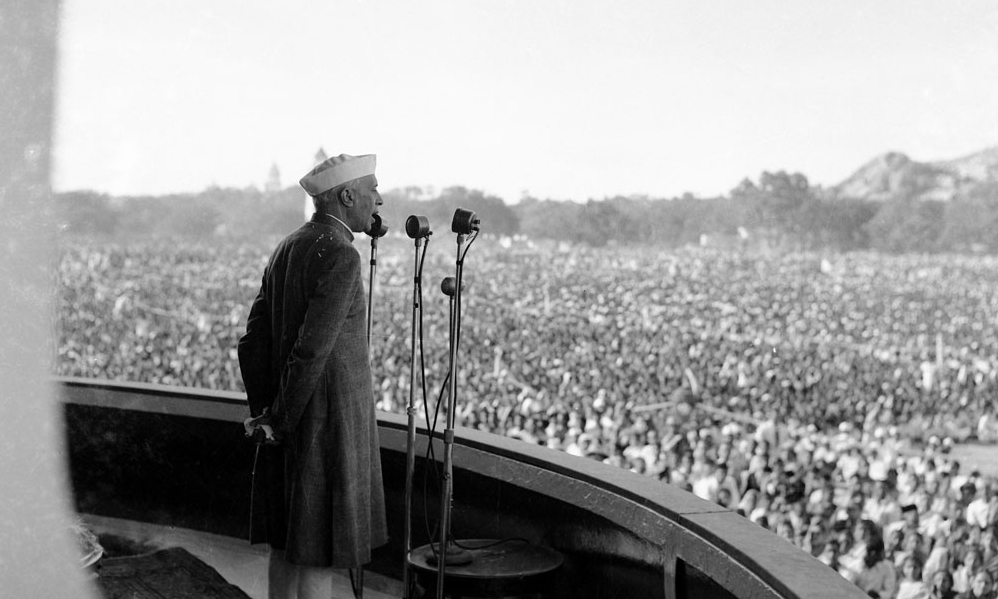
Jawaharlal Nehru addressing crowd at Fateh Maidan after integration of Hyderabad in 1948

During the eight-month siege of Golconda in 1687 the Mughal soldiers were camped on a vast open ground. After their victory, this ground was named as Fateh Maidan (Victory Square). During Asaf Jahi period, Fateh Maidan was used as Polo Grounds. Gymkhana ground in Secunderabad, which was the home of Hyderabad Cricket Association, did not have stands to accommodate the large number of spectators that used to watch the cricket matches. The matches were therefore held at Fateh Maidan even though the grounds were not owned by Hyderabad Cricket Association but by Andhra Pradesh Sports Council. The first test match was hosted in November 1955 against New Zealand. The stadium was renamed as Lal Bahadur Shastri Stadium in 1967. Floodlights were introduced in 1993 during the Hero Cup match between the West Indies and Zimbabwe. The Stadium was the home ground for the Hyderabad cricket team.

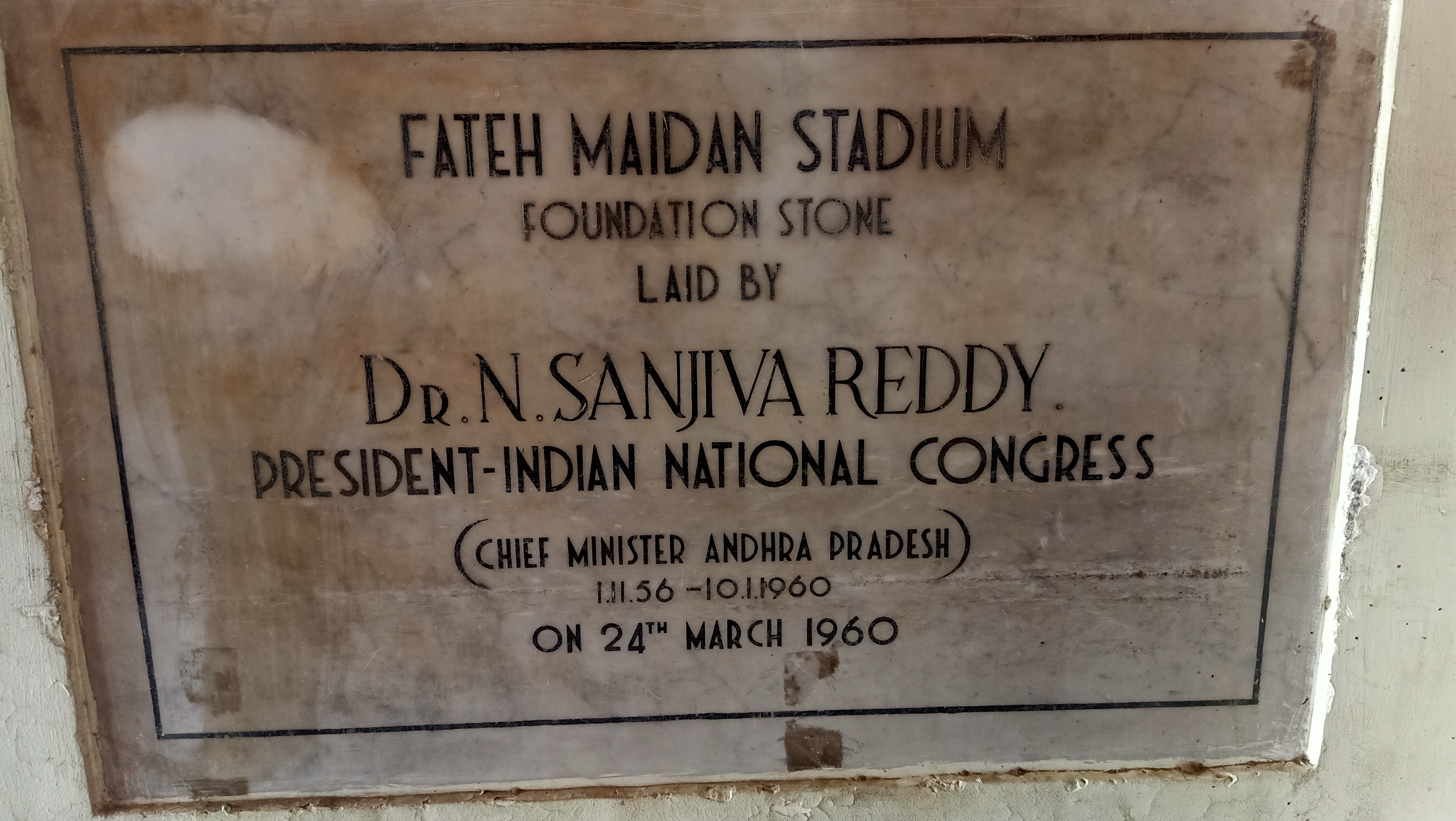
Petroglyph of the Fateh Maidan Stadium Foundation

In 2005, the use of Lal Bahadur Shastri Stadium for International cricket was discontinued when Rajiv Gandhi International Cricket Stadium built across town hosted an ODI Match between India and South Africa. The stadium was hosting Indian Cricket League matches and was the homeground for the 2008 Edelweiss 20's Challenge winners Hyderabad Heroes.

Lal Bahadur Stadium is situated behind the police control room, between the Nizam College and Public Gardens in Hyderabad. It is the venue for many national and international sporting events, especially football and cricket.

It has the capacity to seat around 25,000 people. The swimming pool, shopping complex and the indoor stadium are the important aspects of this stadium. The ground has a flood light facility and now is used by Sports Authority of Telangana State (SATS).

Lal Bahadur Shastri Stadium has hosted only three Test matches – all against New Zealand. Polly Umrigar's double century and Subhash Gupte's 7 wickets in NZ's first innings were the most notable performances of the inaugural Test between these two teams and ended in a draw. In 1988/89, local players Arshad Ayub with seven wickets in the match and Mohammad Azharuddin, who top scored with 81 runs led India to a 10 wicket victory and a 2–1 Series victory.

== ODI cricket ==
The first ODI Match was played in the stadium during the 1983/84 season when India hosted Pakistan and won the match by four wickets. The match between India and Pakistan on 20 March 1987 was a thriller which ended with the scores tied at 212 in 44 overs. India were declared the victors because they lost fewer wickets (six to Pakistan's seven).

In one of the great matches played during the 1987 Cricket World Cup, David Houghton's 142 fell just short of lifting Zimbabwe to an epic victory. Apart from Houghton and Iain Butchart's 54, all other Zimbabwean batsmen scored single figures as New Zealand won by 3 runs. The Hero Cup encounter (1992) between West Indies and Zimbabwe saw the first day/night match in the stadium. The match was easily won by West Indies. In all, the stadium has hosted seven day/night matches. In the 1996 Cricket World Cup, the West Indies overhauled Zimbabwe's 151 in just 29.3 overs on their way to a semi-final appearance in the tournament.

In the 1999/00 season, the stadium hosted the 2nd match in the 5-match ODI Series between India and New Zealand. Having suffered a defeat in Rajkot, India lost Sourav Ganguly in the second over (run-out) as a straight drive from Sachin Richoched off Shayne O'Connor's fingers into the non-striker's stumps. Rahul Dravid and Tendulkar then put on a world-record 331-run partnership off 46.2 overs as India amassed on 376 runs and easily won the match by 174 runs.

In the final match played at Lal Bahadur Shastri Stadium (2003), India played against New Zealand in the TVS Cup encounter that decided the second finalist (Australia already booked its spot). Tendulkar's century and Virender Sehwag's 130 created a platform for Dravid to equal the second fastest fifty by an Indian – 50 off 22 balls as India scored 353 runs and won the match comfortably by 145 runs.

== Venue statistics ==
=== Match information ===
| Game Type | No. of Games |
|---|---|
| Test Matches | 3 |
| ODI | 14 |
| Twenty20 | 0 |

=== Test Match statistics ===
| Category | Information |
|---|---|
| Highest Team Score | India (498/4 – Decl. against New Zealand) |
| Lowest Team Score | India (89 All-Out against New Zealand) |
| Best Batting Performance | Polly Umrigar (223 Runs against New Zealand) |
| Best Bowling Performance | Subhash Gupte (7/128 against New Zealand) |

The highest scores were made by the West Indies, scoring 498–4 in 1959 and 358 all out in 1948. The next highest score was made by New Zealand scoring 326 all out in Test cricket. The most runs scored here was by Polly Umrigar (223 runs), followed by Bert Sutcliffe (154 runs) and John Guy (123 runs). The most wickets taken here were by Erapalli Prasana (8 wickets) by Subhash Gupte (8 wickets) and Dayle Hadlee (7 wickets).

=== ODI Match statistics ===
| Category | Information |
|---|---|
| Highest Team Score | India (376/2 in 50 Overs against New Zealand) |
| Lowest Team Score | Zimbabwe (99 All Out in 36.3 Overs against West Indies) |
| Best Batting Performance | Sachin Tendulkar (186* Runs against New Zealand) |
| Best Bowling Performance | Manoj Prabhakar (5/35 against Sri Lanka) |

The highest scores were made by India, scoring 376–2 in ODIs. The next highest scores were also made by India who scored 353-5 and South Africa who scored 261–7.

The most runs scored here was by Sachin Tendulkar (310 runs), followed by Rahul Dravid (297 runs) and Dave Houghton (164 runs). Anil Kumble (7 wickets), Ajit Agarkar (6 wickets) and Manoj Prabhakar (5 wickets) are the leading wicket-takers on this ground in ODIs.

== List of Centuries ==
=== Key ===
- * denotes that the batsman was not out.
- Inns. denotes the number of the innings in the match.
- Balls denotes the number of balls faced in an innings.
- NR denotes that the number of balls was not recorded.
- Parentheses next to the player's score denote his century number at Edgbaston.
- The column title Date refers to the date the match started.
- The column title Result refers to the player's team result

=== Test Centuries ===
| No. | Score | Player | Team | Balls | Inns. | Opposing team | Date | Result |
|---|---|---|---|---|---|---|---|---|
| 1 | 223 | Polly Umrigar | India | - | 1 | New Zealand | 19 November 1955 | Draw |
| 2 | 118 | Vijay Manjrekar | India | - | 1 | New Zealand | 19 November 1955 | Draw |
| 3 | 100* | A. G. Kripal Singh | India | - | 1 | New Zealand | 19 November 1955 | Draw |
| 4 | 102 | John Guy | New Zealand | - | 2 | India | 19 November 1955 | Draw |
| 5 | 137* | Bert Sutcliffe | New Zealand | - | 3 | India | 19 November 1955 | Draw |

=== One Day Internationals ===
| No. | Score | Player | Team | Balls | Inns. | Opposing team | Date | Result |
|---|---|---|---|---|---|---|---|---|
| 1 | 142 | Dave Houghton | Zimbabwe | 137 | 2 | New Zealand | 10 October 1987 | Lost |
| 2 | 124 | Wayne Larkins | England | 126 | 2 | Australia | 19 October 1989 | Win |
| 3 | 186* | Sachin Tendulkar | India | 150 | 1 | New Zealand | 8 November 1999 | Win |
| 4 | 153 | Rahul Dravid | India | 153 | 1 | New Zealand | 8 November 1999 | Win |
| 5 | 130 | Virender Sehwag | India | 134 | 1 | New Zealand | 15 November 2003 | Win |
| 6 | 102 | Sachin Tendulkar | India | 91 | 1 | New Zealand | 15 November 2003 | Win |

== List of Five Wicket Hauls ==
=== Key ===
| Symbol | Meaning |
|---|---|
| † | The bowler was man of the match |
| ‡ | 10 or more wickets taken in the match |
| § | One of two five-wicket hauls by the bowler in the match |
| Date | Day the Test started or ODI was held |
| Inn | Innings in which five-wicket haul was taken |
| Overs | Number of overs bowled. |
| Runs | Number of runs conceded |
| Wkts | Number of wickets taken |
| Econ | Runs conceded per over |
| Batsmen | Batsmen whose wickets were taken |
| Drawn | The match was drawn. |

=== Tests ===
| No. | Bowler | Date | Team | Opposing team | Inn | Overs | Runs | Wkts | Econ | Batsmen | Result |
|---|---|---|---|---|---|---|---|---|---|---|---|
| 1 | Subhash Gupte | 19 November 1955 | India | New Zealand | 2 | 76.4 | 128 | 7 | 1.66 | Bert Sutcliffe; Eric Petrie; Noel McGregor; Noel Harford; Matt Poore; Harry Cave; Jack Alabaster | Drawn |
| 2 | E. A. S. Prasanna | 15 October 1969 | India | New Zealand | 1 | 29 | 51 | 5 | 1.75 | Bruce Murray; Bevan Congdon; Brian Hastings; Dayle Hadlee; Bruce Taylor | Drawn |

=== ODIs ===
| No. | Bowler | Date | Team | Opposing team | Inn | Overs | Runs | Wkts | Econ | Batsmen | Result |
|---|---|---|---|---|---|---|---|---|---|---|---|
| 1 | Manoj Prabhakar | 18 February 1994 | India | Sri Lanka | 1 | 10 | 35 | 5 | 3.50 | Aruna Gunawardene; Hashan Tillakaratne; Aravinda de Silva; Roshan Mahanama; Arjuna Ranatunga | India won |

== See also ==
- List of Test cricket grounds
- Rajiv Gandhi International Cricket Stadium
