= 1978 Uber Cup squads =

This article lists the squads for the 1978 Uber Cup participating teams. The age listed for each player is on 13 May 1978 which was the first day of the tournament.

== Teams ==
=== Australia ===
Four players represented Australia in the 1978 Uber Cup.

| Name | DoB/Age |
|---|---|
| Audrey Swaby | 31 May 1958 (aged 19) |
| Susan Daly | 12 October 1957 (aged 20) |
| Joan Jones | 25 October 1948 (aged 29) |
| Beverley Hite | 8 December 1948 (aged 29) |

=== Denmark ===
Six players represented Denmark in the 1978 Uber Cup.

| Name | DoB/Age |
|---|---|
| Lene Køppen | 5 May 1953 (aged 25) |
| Pia Nielsen | 1956 (aged 21–22) |
| Inge Borgstrøm | 1957 (aged 20–21) |
| Imre Nielsen | 1945 (aged 32–33) |
| Susanne Berg | 1954 (aged 23–24) |
| Lonny Bostofte | 1945 (aged 32–33) |

=== Indonesia ===
Six players represented Indonesia in the 1978 Uber Cup.

| Name | DoB/Age |
|---|---|
| Ivana Lie | 7 March 1960 (aged 18) |
| Verawaty Wiharjo | 1 October 1957 (aged 20) |
| Tjan So Gwan | 1959 (aged 18–19) |
| Imelda Wiguna | 12 October 1951 (aged 26) |
| Theresia Widiastuti | 1954 (aged 25–26) |
| Regina Masli | 1940 (aged 37–38) |

=== Japan ===
Six players represented Japan in the 1978 Uber Cup.

| Name | DoB/Age |
|---|---|
| Hiroe Yuki | 15 November 1948 (aged 29) |
| Atsuko Tokuda | 15 September 1955 (aged 22) |
| Saori Kondo | 18 March 1956 (aged 22) |
| Emiko Ueno | 3 September 1957 (aged 20) |
| Yoshiko Yonekura | 7 February 1958 (aged 20) |
| Mikiko Takada | 1955 (aged 22–23) |

=== New Zealand ===
Six players represented New Zealand in the 1978 Uber Cup.

| Name | DoB/Age |
|---|---|
| Alison Branfield | 1945 (aged 32–33) |
| Robin Denton | 1950 (aged 27–28) |
| Mary Livingston | 1953 (aged 24–25) |
| Allison Sinton | 1953 (aged 24–25) |
| Lindsey Shirley | 1953 (aged 24–25) |
| Alison Ross | 1955 (aged 22–23) |

=== United States ===
Six players represented United States in the 1978 Uber Cup.

| Name | DoB/Age |
|---|---|
| Cheryl White | 1955 (aged 22–23) |
| Judianne Kelly | 1948 (aged 29–30) |
| Cindy Baker | 1949 (aged 28–29) |
| Pam Bristol Brady | 1953 (aged 24–25) |
| Diana Osterhues | 1953 (aged 24–25) |
| Janet Wilts | 1952 (aged 26–27) |
