= Badminton at the 1978 Asian Games – Women's team =

Women's team at the 1978 Asian Games
- Venue: Indoor Stadium Huamark, Thailand
- Dates: 11 – 14 December 1978

Medalists
gold medal	China; Li Fang, Liang Qiuxia, Liu Xia, Qiu Yufang, Zhang Ailing, Zheng Huiming
silver medal	Indonesia; Ruth Damayanti, Ivana Lie, Tjan So Gwan, Theresia Widiastuti, Imelda Wiguna, Verawaty Wiharjo
bronze medal	Japan; Saori Kondo, Mikiko Takada, Atsuko Tokuda, Emiko Ueno, Yoshiko Yonekura, Hiroe Yuki
bronze medal	Thailand; Porntip Buntanon, Suleeporn Jittariyakul, Thongkam Kingmanee, Petchroong Liengtrakulngam, Sirisriro Patama

The badminton women's team tournament at the 1978 Asian Games took place from 11 to 14 December at the Indoor Stadium Huamark in Bangkok, Thailand.

== Schedule ==
All times are Thailand Standard Time (UTC+07:00)

Date	Time	Event
Monday, 11 December 1978	10:30	Group stage
Tuesday, 12 December 1978	10:30	Group stage
Wednesday, 13 December 1978	10:30; 18:30	Group stage
Thursday, 14 December 1970	10:30	Gold medal match

== Group stage ==
=== Group A ===
Pos	Team	Pld	W	L	MF	MA	MD	Pts	Qualification
1	Indonesia	2	2	0	6	1	+5	2	Advance to Gold medal match
2	Thailand (H)	2	1	1	4	3	+1	1	Bronze medallists
3	Malaysia	2	0	2	0	6	−6	0	

=== Group B ===
Pos	Team	Pld	W	L	MF	MA	MD	Pts	Qualification
1	China	2	2	0	6	0	+6	2	Advance to Gold medal match
2	Japan	2	1	1	6	2	+4	1	Bronze medallists
3	South Korea	2	0	2	0	6	−6	0	

== Gold medal match ==
=== China vs Indonesia ===
China
5
Indoor Stadium Huamark
14 December 1978, 10:30

Indonesia
0

			1	2	3
1	(China) (Indonesia)	Liu Xia; Verawaty Wiharjo	11; 8	11; 6
2	(China) (Indonesia)	Liang Qiuxia; Ivana Lie	11; 8	11; 1
3	(China) (Indonesia)	Qiu Yufang / Zheng Huiming; Tjan So Gwan / Imelda Wiguna	18; 16	15; 10
4	(China) (Indonesia)	Liang Qiuxia / Zhang Ailing; Ruth Damayanti / Theresia Widiastuti	15; 0	15; 4
5	(China) (Indonesia)	Li Fang; Tjan So Gwan	11; 2	11; 5
