= 1981 Uber Cup squads =

This article lists the squads for the 1981 Uber Cup participating teams. The age listed for each player is on 22 May 1981 which was the first day of the tournament.

== Teams ==
=== Canada ===
Five players represented Canada in the 1981 Uber Cup.

Name	DoB/Age
Wendy Carter	11 March 1956 (aged 25)
Jane Youngberg	25 December 1948 (aged 32)
Claire Backhouse	13 May 1958 (aged 23)
Sandra Skillings	1959 (aged 21–22)
Denyse Julien	22 July 1960 (aged 20)

=== England ===
Six players represented England in the 1981 Uber Cup.

Name	DoB/Age
Jane Webster	2 August 1956 (aged 24)
Sally Leadbeater	8 February 1962 (aged 19)
Nora Perry	15 June 1954 (aged 26)
Karen Chapman	21 May 1959 (aged 22)
Karen Bridge	27 March 1960 (aged 21)
Barbara Sutton	1953 (aged 27–28)

=== Indonesia ===
Six players represented Indonesia in the 1981 Uber Cup.

Name	DoB/Age
Ivana Lie	7 March 1960 (aged 21)
Verawaty Wiharjo	1 October 1957 (aged 23)
Taty Sumirah	9 February 1952 (aged 29)
Imelda Wiguna	12 October 1951 (aged 29)
Theresia Widiastuti	1954 (aged 26–27)
Ruth Damayanti	1960 (aged 20–21)

=== Japan ===
Four players represented Japan in the 1981 Uber Cup.

Name	DoB/Age
Saori Kondo	18 March 1956 (aged 25)
Yoshiko Yonekura	7 February 1958 (aged 23)
Mikiko Takada	1955 (aged 25–26)
Atsuko Tokuda	15 September 1955 (aged 25)

=== Malaysia ===
Six players represented Malaysia in the 1981 Uber Cup.

Name	DoB/Age
Katherine Teh	1955 (aged 25–26)
Leong Chai Lean	1960 (aged 20–21)
Khaw Mooi Eng	1959 (aged 21–22)
Khor Lay See	1960 (aged 20–21)
Clare Choo	1962 (aged 18–19)
Juliet Poon	1958 (aged 22–23)
