= 1978 All England Open Badminton Championships =

1978 All England Championships
Tournament details
- Dates: 15 March 1978– 18 March 1978
- Edition: 68th
- Venue: Wembley Arena
- Location: London

The 1978 All England Championships was a badminton tournament held at Wembley Arena, London, England, from 15–18 March 1978. The event was sponsored by John Player.

== Final results ==
Category	Winners	Runners-up	Score
Men's singles	(Indonesia) Liem Swie King	(Indonesia) Rudy Hartono	15–10, 15–3
Women's singles	(England) Gillian Gilks	(Japan) Saori Kondo	11–1, 11–9
Men's doubles	(Indonesia) Tjun Tjun & Johan Wahjudi	(Indonesia) Christian Hadinata & Ade Chandra	15–12, 15–8
Women's doubles	(Japan) Atsuko Tokuda & Mikiko Takada	(Japan) Emiko Ueno & Yoshiko Yonekura	18-16, 15-6
Mixed doubles	(England) Mike Tredgett & Nora Perry	(Denmark) Steen Skovgaard & Lene Køppen	15-7, 15–4

== Men's singles ==
=== Seeds ===
1-2 (Indonesia) Rudy Hartono
1-2 (Denmark) Svend Pri
3-4 (Denmark) Flemming Delfs
3-4 (Sweden) Thomas Kihlström
5-8 (Denmark) Morten Frost Hansen
5-8 (Indonesia) Liem Swie King

=== Section 1 ===
Round of 32
(Indonesia) Liem Swie King	15	15
(Denmark) Elo Hansen	8	5
(Denmark) Torben Nielsen	9	15	15
(Japan) Yoshitaka Iino	15	9	11
(Denmark) Svend Pri
(Japan) Nobutaka Ikeda
(New Zealand) Bryan Purser	15	15
(England) Mike Tredgett	5	10
(Indonesia) Iie Sumirat	15	15
(Denmark) Kenneth Larsen	5	17
(Japan) Kinji Zeniya	15	15
(Australia) Mark Harry	11	7
(Sweden) Thomas Kihlström	15	17
(Denmark) Jesper Helledie	4	15
(England) Michael Wilks	15	17
(New Zealand) Richard Purser	6	14

Round of 16
(Indonesia) Swie King	15	15
(Denmark) Nielsen	4	2
(Denmark) Pri	13	15	15
(New Zealand) Purser	15	8	12
(Indonesia) Sumirat	15	15
(Japan) Zeniya	1	3
(Sweden) Kihlström	15	15
(England) Wilks	9	4

Quarter-finals
(Indonesia) Swie King	15	15
(Denmark) Pri	10	5
(Indonesia) Sumirat	6	15	15
(Sweden) Kihlström	15	8	4

Semi-finals
(Indonesia) Swie King	15	15
(Indonesia) Sumirat	11	13

=== Section 2 ===
Round of 32
(Indonesia) Rudy Hartono	15	15
(England) Brian White	9
(Sweden) Sture Johnsson	15	15
(Japan) Shoichi Toganoo	3	4
(Denmark) Morten Frost	15	15
(India) Sanjay Sharma	7	8
(Denmark) Henrik Fahrenholz	15	15
(South Africa) Johan Croukamp	7	7
(Denmark) Flemming Delfs	15	15
(South Africa) Gordon McMillan	11	6
(Sweden) Christian Lundberg	15	15
(Denmark) P Lind
(India) Prakash Padukone	15	15
(Canada) Pat Tyron	5	7
(Japan) Masao Tsuchida	15	15
(England) Brian Wallwork	2	8

Round of 16
(Indonesia) Hartono	15	10	18
(Sweden) Johnsson	9	15	17
(Denmark) Frost	15	15
(Denmark) Fahrenholz	8	8
(Denmark) Delfs	15	15
(Sweden) Lundberg	12	3
(India) Padukone	15	18
(Japan) Tsuchida	5	14

Quarter-finals
(Indonesia) Hartono	15	15
(Denmark) Frost	8	7
(Denmark) Delfs	5	15	15
(India) Padukone	15	8	11

Semi-finals
(Indonesia) Hartono	15	15
(Denmark) Delfs	7	12

== Women's singles ==
=== Seeds ===
1-2 (England) Gillian Gilks
1-2 (Denmark) Lene Køppen

=== Section 1 ===
Round of 32
(England) Gillian Gilks	11	11
(Denmark) Lonny Bostofte	0	3
(Japan) Yoshiko Yonekura	11	11
(England) P Ferrington	3	2
(Japan) Atsuko Tokuda	12	11
(Indonesia) Taty Sumirah	10	2
(England) Heather Neilsen	11	12
(Denmark) Kirsten Meier	2	10
(Japan) Hiroe Yuki	11	11
(Denmark) Imre Nielsen	4	3
(West Germany) Eva-Maria Zwiebler	2	11	11
(Sweden) Anette Börjesson	11	8	9
(Japan) Mikiko Takada	11	11
(Netherlands) Marjan Ridder	6	9
(Denmark) Inge Borgstrøm	13	11
(Indonesia) Verawaty Wiharjo	11	3

Round of 16
(England) Gilks	11	11
(Japan) Yonekura	5	6
(Japan) Tokuda	11	11
(England) Nielsen	3	1
(Japan) Yuki	11	11
(West Germany) Zwiebler	2	1
(Japan) Takada	11	11
(Denmark) Borgstrøm	3	8

Quarter-finals
(England) Gilks	11	11
(Japan) Tokuda	0	7
(Japan) Yuki	11	11
(Japan) Takada	3	3

Semi-finals
(England) Gilks	12	5	11
(Japan) Yuki	11	11	3

=== Section 2 ===
Round of 32
(Japan) Saori Kondo	11	11
(Denmark) Marianne Christensen	1	1
(England) Karen Bridge	11	11
(Indonesia) Ivana Lie	1	8
(Netherlands) Joke van Beusekom	11	8	11
(Denmark) Jette Boyer	1	11	6
(Denmark) Pia Nielsen	11	11
(Indonesia) Ruth Damayanti	4	3
(Canada) Wendy Clarkson	11	11
(Denmark) Susanne Berg	3	1
(Japan) Emiko Ueno	11	11
(England) Sue Whittaker	3	3
(Denmark) Lene Køppen	11	11
(South Africa) Gussie Botes	4	6
(England) Jane Webster	11	11
(Indonesia) Tan Soo Gwan	1	2

Round of 16
(Japan) Kondo	8	11	11
(England) Bridge	11	5	4
(Netherlands) van Beusekom	11	11
(Denmark) Nielsen	7	0
(Canada) Clarkson	11	11
(Japan) Ueno	2	8
(Denmark) Køppen	11	11
(England) Webster	3	5

Quarter-finals
(Japan) Kondo	9	11	11
(Netherlands) van Beusekom	11	7	2
(Canada) Clarkson	11	6	11
(Denmark) Køppen	8	11	8

Semi-finals
(Japan) Kondo	5	11	11
(Canada) Clarkson	11	6	7
