= 1975 Uber Cup squads =

This article lists the squads for the 1975 Uber Cup participating teams. The age listed for each player is on 31 May 1975 which was the first day of the tournament.

== Teams ==
=== Australia ===
Four players represented New Zealand in the 1975 Uber Cup.

| Name | DoB/Age |
|---|---|
| Judy Nyirati | 30 June 1944 (aged 30) |
| Joan Jones | 25 October 1948 (aged 26) |
| Kay Terry | 22 June 1941 (aged 33) |
| Beverley Hite | 8 December 1948 (aged 26) |

=== Canada ===
Six players represented Canada in the 1975 Uber Cup.

| Name | DoB/Age |
|---|---|
| Alison Delf | 1945 (aged 29–30) |
| Jane Youngberg | 25 December 1948 (aged 26) |
| Lesley Harris | 18 October 1954 (aged 20) |
| Barbara Welch | 28 February 1948 (aged 27) |
| Wendy Clarkson | 11 March 1956 (aged 19) |
| Lorraine Thorne | 1950 (aged 24–25) |

=== England ===
Six players represented Denmark in the 1975 Uber Cup.

| Name | DoB/Age |
|---|---|
| Margaret Beck | 9 January 1952 (aged 23) |
| Gillian Gilks | 20 June 1950 (aged 24) |
| Jane Webster | 2 August 1952 (aged 22) |
| Margaret Boxall | 1945 (aged 29–30) |
| Susan Whetnall | 11 December 1942 (aged 32) |
| Barbara Giles | 1953 (aged 21–22) |

=== Indonesia ===
Six players represented Indonesia in the 1975 Uber Cup.

| Name | DoB/Age |
|---|---|
| Utami Dewi | 16 January 1951 (aged 24) |
| Taty Sumirah | 9 February 1952 (aged 23) |
| Theresia Widiastuti | 1954 (aged 20–21) |
| Imelda Wiguna | 12 October 1951 (aged 23) |
| Regina Masli | 1940 (aged 34–35) |
| Minarni Soedaryanto | 10 May 1944 (aged 31) |

=== Japan ===
Six players represented Japan in the 1975 Uber Cup.

| Name | DoB/Age |
|---|---|
| Noriko Nakayama | 30 May 1943 (aged 32) |
| Hiroe Yuki | 15 November 1948 (aged 26) |
| Atsuko Tokuda | 15 September 1955 (aged 19) |
| Machiko Aizawa | 1949 (aged 25–26) |
| Etsuko Takenaka | 1950 (aged 24–25) |
| Mika Ikeda | 1950 (aged 24–25) |

=== Malaysia ===
Six players represented Malaysia in the 1975 Uber Cup.

| Name | DoB/Age |
|---|---|
| Sylvia Ng | 24 September 1949 (aged 25) |
| Rosalind Singha Ang | 30 November 1939 (aged 35) |
| Katherine Teh | 1955 (aged 19–20) |
| Ong Ah Hong | 1953 (aged 21–22) |
| Sylvia Tan | 1945 (aged 29–30) |
| Yap Hei Lin | 1947 (aged 27–28) |
