= 1977 All England Open Badminton Championships =

1977 All England Championships
Tournament details
- Dates: 23 March 1977– 26 March 1977
- Edition: 67th
- Venue: Wembley Arena
- Location: London

The 1977 All England Championships was a badminton tournament held at Wembley Arena, London, England from 23–26 March 1977. The event attracted sponsorship from John Player.

== Final results ==
Category	Winners	Runners-up	Score
Men's singles	(Denmark) Flemming Delfs	(Indonesia) Liem Swie King	15–17, 15–11, 15–8
Women's singles	(Japan) Hiroe Yuki	(Denmark) Lene Køppen	7–11, 11–3, 11–7
Men's doubles	(Indonesia) Tjun Tjun & Johan Wahjudi	(Indonesia) Christian Hadinata & Ade Chandra	15-7, 18-15
Women's doubles	(Japan) Etsuko Toganoo & Emiko Ueno	(England) Margaret Lockwood & Nora Perry	7–15, 15–3, 15–7
Mixed doubles	(England) Derek Talbot & Gillian Gilks	(England) Mike Tredgett & Nora Perry	15-9, 15-9

== Men's singles ==
=== Section 1 ===
Round of 32
(Denmark) Flemming Delfs	15	15
(West Germany) Roland Maywald	9	7
(England) Mike Tredgett	15	15
(Japan) Nobutaka Ikeda	8	5
(England) Derek Talbot	15	15
(Soviet Union) Konstantin Vavilov	11	1
(Denmark) Torben Nielsen	15	15
(England) Peter Higman	8	3
(Indonesia) Iie Sumirat	15	15
(West Germany) Michael Schnaase	8	9
(Denmark) Jesper Helledie	15	15
(England) Brian White	4	4
(Sweden) Sture Johnsson	15	15
(Japan) Kinji Zeniya	7	7
(Denmark) Elo Hansen	15	15
(Netherlands) Rob Ridder	4	5

Round of 16
(Denmark) Delfs	15	15
(England) Tredgett	5	6
(England) Talbot	7	15	15
(Denmark) Nielsen	15	10	9
(Indonesia) Sumirat	15	15
(Denmark) Helledie	10	9
(Sweden) Johnsson	15	15
(Denmark) Hansen	2	4

Quarter-finals
(Denmark) Delfs	15	15
(England) Talbot	5	5
(Indonesia) Sumirat	8	15	15
(Sweden) Johnsson	15	12	8

Semi-finals
(Denmark) Delfs	15	15
(Indonesia) Sumirat	5	5

=== Section 2 ===
Round of 32
(Indonesia) Liem Swie King	15	15
(England) David Eddy	10	12
(Denmark) Morten Frost	15	15
(England) Gordon Hamilton	11	6
(India) Prakash Padukone	15	15
(England) Ray Rofe	8	7
(Japan) Masao Tsuchida	15	15
(England) Tim Goode	6	7
(Denmark) Svend Pri	15	15
(Australia) Peter Cooper	10	7
(Japan) Yoshitaka Iino	15	15
(England) Mike Wilks	4	3
(Denmark) Mogens Neergaard	11	17	15
(Sweden) Tomas Angarth	15	14	6
(Sweden) Thomas Kihlström	10	15	15
(England) Ray Stevens	15	13	12

Round of 16
(Indonesia) Swie King	10	15	15
(Denmark) Frost	15	4	13
(India) Prakash	5	15	15
(Japan) Tsuchida	15	4	0
(Denmark) Pri	15	15
(Japan) Iino	3	7
(Denmark) Neergaard	15	15
(Sweden) Kihlström	10	6

Quarter-finals
(Indonesia) Swie King	18	15
(India) Prakash	14	6
(Denmark) Pri	15	15
(Denmark) Neergaard	5	3

Semi-finals
(Indonesia) Swie King	15	15
(Denmark) Pri	7	3

== Women's singles ==
Etsuko Takenaka married and competed as Etsuko Toganoo and Nora Gardner married and competed as Nora Perry.

=== Section 1 ===
Round of 32
(Japan) Hiroe Yuki	11	11
(Netherlands) Marjan Ridder	6	4
(West Germany) Eva-Maria Kranz	11	11
(Denmark) Pia Nielsen	8	2
(England) Paula Kilvington	11	1	11
(Sweden) Anette Börjesson	7	11	9
(Indonesia) Verawaty Wiharjo	11	11
(England) Hazel Wickson	8	2
(England) Gillian Gilks	11	11
(West Germany) Brigitte Steden	3	0
(Japan) Emiko Ueno	12	11
(Republic of Ireland) Barbara Beckett	11	4
(Denmark) Lonny Bostofte	11	11
(Australia) Susan Daly	7	6
(Netherlands) Joke van Beusekom	11	11
(Denmark) Jette Boyer	5	7

Round of 16
(Japan) Yuki	11	11
(West Germany) Kranz	2	2
(England) Kilvington	0	11	11
(Indonesia) Verawaty	11	9	6
(England) Gilks	11	11
(Japan) Ueno	2	1
(Denmark) Bostofte	8	11	11
(Netherlands) Van Beusekom	11	5	4

Quarter-finals
(Japan) Yuki	11	11
(England) Kilvington	2	3
(England) Gilks	3	11	11
(Denmark) Bostofte	11	8	0

Semi-finals
(Japan) Yuki	12	11
(England) Gilks	10	8

=== Section 2 ===
Round of 32
(Denmark) Lene Køppen	9	11	11
(Japan) Atsuko Tokuda	11	2	2
(England) Jane Webster	11	11
(England) Pauline Davis	5	7
(Japan) Etsuko Toganoo	11	11
(West Germany) Elke Weber	1	3
(Canada) Jane Youngberg	11	11
(England) Sue Whetnall	4	4
(England) Margaret Lockwood	11	11
(Netherlands) Hanke de Kort	2	0
(Canada) Wendy Clarkson	11	11
(West Germany) Irmgard Gerlatzka	8	5
(Japan) Saori Kondo	11	11
(Denmark) Susanne Berg	2	0
(Indonesia) Taty Sumirah	11	12
(Scotland) Joanne Flockhart	5	10

Round of 16
(Denmark) Køppen	11	11
(England) Webster	0	2
(Japan) Toganoo	11	12
(Canada) Youngberg	3	11
(England) Lockwood	11	11
(Canada) Clarkson	2	8
(Japan) Kondo	11	11
(Indonesia) Sumirah	3	4

Quarter-finals
(Denmark) Køppen	11	12
(Japan) Toganoo	7	9
(England) Lockwood	11	11
(Japan) Kondo	8	5

Semi-finals
(Denmark) Køppen	12	11
(England) Lockwood	9	6
