= 1977 IBF World Championships – Women's doubles =

Women's doubles at the 1977 IBF World Championships
- Venue: Malmö Isstadion
- Location: Malmö, Sweden
- Dates: May 3, 1977 – May 8, 1977

Medalists
gold medal	Etsuko Toganoo; Emiko Ueno	Japan
silver medal	Joke van Beusekom; Marjan Ridder	Netherlands
bronze medal	Margaret Lockwood; Nora Perry	England
bronze medal	Inge Borgstrøm; Pia Nielsen	Denmark

The 1. IBF World Championships took place 1977 in Malmö, Sweden. Following the results of the women's doubles. (Note: Results of the first rounds incomplete.)

== Main stage ==
=== Section 1 ===
First round
(Japan) Etsuko Toganoo (Japan) Emiko Ueno
(Indonesia) Sri Wiyanti (Indonesia) Imelda Wiguna

Second round
(Japan) Etsuko Toganoo (Japan) Emiko Ueno
(Indonesia) Sri Wiyanti (Indonesia) Imelda Wiguna

Third round
(Japan) Etsuko Toganoo (Japan) Emiko Ueno
(Indonesia) Sri Wiyanti (Indonesia) Imelda Wiguna

Quarterfinals
(Japan) Etsuko Toganoo (Japan) Emiko Ueno	15	15
(Indonesia) Sri Wiyanti (Indonesia) Imelda Wiguna	7	8

=== Section 2 ===
First round
(Denmark) Inge Borgstrøm (Denmark) Pia Nielsen
(Scotland) Joanne Flockhart (Scotland) Christine Stewart

Second round
(Denmark) Inge Borgstrøm (Denmark) Pia Nielsen
(Scotland) Joanne Flockhart (Scotland) Christine Stewart

Third round
(Denmark) Inge Borgstrøm (Denmark) Pia Nielsen
(Scotland) Joanne Flockhart (Scotland) Christine Stewart

Quarterfinals
(Denmark) Inge Borgstrøm (Denmark) Pia Nielsen	15	15
(Scotland) Joanne Flockhart (Scotland) Christine Stewart	5	4

=== Section 3 ===
First round
(Netherlands) Joke van Beusekom (Netherlands) Marjan Ridder
(Indonesia) Theresia Widiastuti (Indonesia) Regina Masli

Second round
(Netherlands) Joke van Beusekom (Netherlands) Marjan Ridder
(Indonesia) Theresia Widiastuti (Indonesia) Regina Masli

Third round
(Netherlands) Joke van Beusekom (Netherlands) Marjan Ridder
(Indonesia) Theresia Widiastuti (Indonesia) Regina Masli

Quarterfinals
(Netherlands) Joke van Beusekom (Netherlands) Marjan Ridder	17	18
(Indonesia) Theresia Widiastuti (Indonesia) Regina Masli	14	15

=== Section 4 ===
First round
(England) Margaret Lockwood (England) Nora Perry
(Japan) Atsuko Tokuda (Japan) Mikiko Takada

Second round
(England) Margaret Lockwood (England) Nora Perry
(Japan) Atsuko Tokuda (Japan) Mikiko Takada

Third round
(England) Margaret Lockwood (England) Nora Perry
(Japan) Atsuko Tokuda (Japan) Mikiko Takada

Quarterfinals
(England) Margaret Lockwood (England) Nora Perry	15	15
(Japan) Atsuko Tokuda (Japan) Mikiko Takada	9	7

== Final stage ==
Quarterfinals
(Japan) Etsuko Toganoo (Japan) Emiko Ueno	15	15
(Indonesia) Sri Wiyanti (Indonesia) Imelda Wiguna	7	8
(Denmark) Inge Borgstrøm (Denmark) Pia Nielsen	15	15
(Scotland) Joanne Flockhart (Scotland) Christine Stewart	5	4
(Netherlands) Joke van Beusekom (Netherlands) Marjan Ridder	17	18
(Indonesia) Theresia Widiastuti (Indonesia) Regina Masli	14	15
(England) Margaret Lockwood (England) Nora Perry	15	15
(Japan) Atsuko Tokuda (Japan) Mikiko Takada	9	7

Semifinals
(Japan) Etsuko Toganoo (Japan) Emiko Ueno	15	15	15
(Denmark) Inge Borgstrøm (Denmark) Pia Nielsen	8	17	8
(Netherlands) Joke van Beusekom (Netherlands) Marjan Ridder	4	15	15
(England) Margaret Lockwood (England) Nora Perry	15	6	8

Finals
(Japan) Etsuko Toganoo (Japan) Emiko Ueno	15	15
(Netherlands) Joke van Beusekom (Netherlands) Marjan Ridder	10	11
