= 1973 Denmark Open =

The 1973 Denmark Open in Badminton took place from 12 to 17 March 1973 in Copenhagen.

== Final results ==
| Category | Winners | Runners-up | Score |
|---|---|---|---|
| Men's singles | (Indonesia) Rudy Hartono | (Denmark) Flemming Delfs | 17-14, 15–12 |
| Women's singles | (Japan) Hiroe Yuki | (Denmark) Imre Rietveld Nielsen | 11-7, 11,6 |
| Men's doubles | (Indonesia) Tjun Tjun & Johan Wahjudi | (Indonesia) Ade Chandra & Christian Hadinata | 15-3, 15–7 |
| Women's doubles | (Netherlands) Joke van Beusekom & Marjan Luesken | (Denmark) Karin Jørgensen & Ulla Strand | 17-14, 17,14 |
| Mixed doubles | (Denmark) Elo Hansen& Ulla Strand | (England) Derek Talbot & Nora Gardner | 4-15, 17–14, 15–10 |
