= Inge Borgstrøm =

Danish badminton player

Medal record

Women's badminton

Representing Denmark

World Championships
| Bronze medal – third place | 1977 Malmö | Women's doubles |

European Championships
| Bronze medal – third place | 1978 Preston | Women's doubles |

European Mixed Team Championships
| Silver medal – second place | 1978 Preston | Mixed team |

European Junior Championships
| Gold medal – first place | 1975 Copenhagen | Mixed team |
| Silver medal – second place | 1975 Copenhagen | Girls' doubles |
| Bronze medal – third place | 1975 Copenhagen | Girls' singles |

Inge Borgström is a retired badminton player of Denmark.

== Career ==
She won the bronze medal at the 1977 IBF World Championships in women's doubles with Pia Nielsen. They also won a bronze at European Championship in 1978 after being beaten by Nora Perry and Anne Statt of England in semifinals with 14–17, 11–15.

== Achievements ==
=== World Championships ===
Women's doubles
| Year | Venue | Partner | Opponent | Score | Result |
|---|---|---|---|---|---|
| 1977 | Malmö Isstadion, Malmö, Sweden | (Denmark) Pia Nielsen | (Japan) Etsuko Toganoo (Japan) Emiko Ueno | 8–15, 17–15, 8–15 | Bronze |

=== European Championships ===
Women's doubles
| Year | Venue | Partner | Opponent | Score | Result |
|---|---|---|---|---|---|
| 1978 | Guild Hall, Preston, England | (Denmark) Pia Nielsen | (England) Nora Perry (England) Anne Statt | 14–17, 11–15 | Bronze |

=== European Junior Championships ===
Girls' singles
| Year | Venue | Opponent | Score | Result |
|---|---|---|---|---|
| 1975 | Gladsaxe Sportscenter, Copenhagen, Denmark | (England) Paula Kilvington | 6–11, 10–12 | Bronze |

Girls' doubles
| Year | Venue | Partner | Opponent | Score | Result |
|---|---|---|---|---|---|
| 1975 | Gladsaxe Sportscenter, Copenhagen, Denmark | (Denmark) Pia Nielsen | (Denmark) Liselotte Gøttsche (Denmark) Lilli B. Pedersen | 10–15, 13–15 | Silver |

=== International tournaments ===
Women's singles
| Year | Tournament | Opponent | Score | Result |
|---|---|---|---|---|
| 1976 | Norwegian International | (Sweden) Anette Börjesson | 11–4, 3–11, 9–11 | (silver) Runner-up |
| 1976 | Czechoslovakian International | (East Germany) Monika Cassens | 12–11, 11–6 | (gold) Winner |
| 1977 | Norwegian International | (Denmark) Pia Nielsen | 11–4, 11–6 | (gold) Winner |
| 1977 | Czechoslovakian International | (Netherlands) Marjan Ridder | 11–2, 11–4 | (gold) Winner |

Women's doubles
| Year | Tournament | Partner | Opponent | Score | Result |
|---|---|---|---|---|---|
| 1975 | Nordic Championships | (Denmark) Lene Køppen | (Denmark) Liselotte Gøttsche (Denmark) Pia Nielsen | 15–2, 15–11 | (gold) Winner |
| 1975 | Denmark Open | (Denmark) Lene Køppen | (Indonesia) Imelda Wiguna (Indonesia) Theresia Widiastuti | 15–3, 3–15, 10–15 | (silver) Runner-up |
| 1975 | Norwegian International | (Denmark) Lene Køppen | (Netherlands) Joke van Beusekom (Sweden) Anette Börjesson | 15–3, 15–7 | (gold) Winner |
| 1976 | Nordic Championships | (Denmark) Pernille Kaagaard | (Denmark) Lene Køppen (Denmark) Pia Nielsen | 15–10, 9–15, 16–18 | (silver) Runner-up |
| 1976 | Denmark Open | (Denmark) Lene Køppen | (Netherlands) Joke van Beusekom (Netherlands) Marjan Ridder | 12–15, 11–15 | (silver) Runner-up |
| 1976 | Norwegian International | (Denmark) Pernille Kaagaard | (Denmark) Susanne Mølgaard (Denmark) Pia Nielsen | 15–5, 15–9 | (gold) Winner |
| 1976 | Czechoslovakian International | (Denmark) Pia Nielsen | (East Germany) Monika Cassens (East Germany) Angela Michalowski | 3–15, 6–15 | (silver) Runner-up |
| 1977 | Nordic Championships | (Denmark) Lene Køppen | (Denmark) Lonny Bostofte (Denmark) Imre Rietveld Nielsen | 15–10, 15–7 | (gold) Winner |
| 1977 | Norwegian International | (Denmark) Kirsten Meier | (Denmark) Lonny Bostofte (Denmark) Pia Nielsen | 5–15, 15–18 | (silver) Runner-up |
| 1977 | German Open | (Denmark) Pia Nielsen | (England) Barbara Giles (England) Jane Webster | 10–15, 11–15 | (silver) Runner-up |
| 1977 | Japan Open | (Denmark) Lene Køppen | (Japan) Emiko Ueno (Japan) Yoshiko Yonekura | 18–13, 15–9 | (gold) Winner |
| 1978 | Nordic Championships | (Denmark) Pia Nielsen | (Denmark) Lene Køppen (Denmark) Susanne Berg | 4–15, 8–15 | (silver) Runner-up |
| 1979 | Nordic Championships | (Denmark) Lene Køppen | (Denmark) Kirsten Larsen (Denmark) Pia Nielsen | 15–7, 15–2 | (gold) Winner |

Mixed doubles
| Year | Tournament | Partner | Opponent | Score | Result |
|---|---|---|---|---|---|
| 1975 | Norwegian International | (Denmark) Elo Hansen | (Denmark) Niels Bruun (Netherlands) Joke van Beusekom | 15–4, 15–14 | (gold) Winner |
| 1977 | Nordic Championships | (Denmark) Mogens Neergaard | (Denmark) Steen Skovgaard (Denmark) Lene Køppen | 3–15, 2–15 | (silver) Runner-up |
| 1977 | Norwegian International | (Denmark) Mogens Neergaard | (Denmark) Morten Frost (Denmark) Pia Nielsen | 15–6, 15–3 | (gold) Winner |
| 1979 | Nordic Championships | (Denmark) Jan Hammergaard | (Denmark) Steen Skovgaard (Denmark) Lene Køppen | 6–15, 2–15 | (silver) Runner-up |
