= Lene Køppen =

Danish badminton player (born 1953)

Personal information
- Born: 5 May 1953 (age 73) Copenhagen, Denmark

Sport
- Country: Denmark
- Sport: Badminton
- Highest ranking: 1
Medal record
Women's badminton
Representing Denmark
World Championships
Gold medal – first place	1977 Malmö	Women's Singles
Gold medal – first place	1977 Malmö	Mixed Doubles
Bronze medal – third place	1980 Jakarta	Women's Singles
Bronze medal – third place	1980 Jakarta	Mixed Doubles
World Games
Bronze medal – third place	1981 Santa Clara	Women's singles
Bronze medal – third place	1981 Santa Clara	Mixed doubles
World Cup
Gold medal – first place	1979 Tokyo	Women's singles
Gold medal – first place	1980 Kyoto	Women's singles
Gold medal – first place	1982 Kuala Lumpur	Women's singles
European Championships
Gold medal – first place	1978 Preston	Women's singles
Gold medal – first place	1982 Böblingen	Women's singles
Silver medal – second place	1974 Vienna	Women's singles
Silver medal – second place	1976 Dublin	Women's singles
Silver medal – second place	1978 Preston	Women's doubles
Silver medal – second place	1976 Dublin	Mixed doubles
Bronze medal – third place	1972 Karlskrona	Women's doubles
Bronze medal – third place	1982 Böblingen	Women's doubles
European Mixed Team Championships
Gold medal – first place	1976 Dublin	Mixed team
Gold medal – first place	1980 Groningen	Mixed team
Silver medal – second place	1972 Karlskrona	Mixed team
Silver medal – second place	1974 Vienna	Mixed team
Silver medal – second place	1978 Preston	Mixed team
Bronze medal – third place	1982 Böblingen	Mixed team
European Junior Championships
Gold medal – first place	1971 Gottwaldov	Women's doubles
Bronze medal – third place	1971 Gottwaldov	Mixed doubles

Lene Køppen (born 5 May 1953) is a Danish badminton player who won numerous national and major international championships from the early 1970s through the early 1980s. Noted for her speed and athleticism, she and Camilla Martin are the only Danish women to win both the World (1977) and All-England (1979, 1980) singles titles. In the first IBF World Championships in 1977 she captured the mixed doubles (with Steen Skovgaard) as well as women's singles to become the first of only seven players, through 2010, to win two events in the same edition of this tournament. Notably, her badminton success came as she was studying and then practising dentistry. She was elected to the World Badminton Hall of Fame in 1998. She is the mother of badminton player Marie Røpke.

== Achievements ==
=== World Championships ===
Women's singles
Year	Venue	Opponent	Score	Result
1977	Malmö Isstadion, Malmö, Sweden	(England) Gillian Gilks	12–9, 12–11	Gold
1980	Istora Senayan, Jakarta, Indonesia	(Indonesia) Ivana Lie	11–12, 2–11	Bronze

Mixed doubles
Year	Venue	Partner	Opponent	Score	Result
1977	Malmö Isstadion, Malmö, Sweden	(Denmark) Steen Skovgaard	(England) Derek Talbot (England) Gillian Gilks	15–12, 18–17	Gold
1980	Istora Senayan, Jakarta, Indonesia	(Denmark) Steen Skovgaard	(Indonesia) Christian Hadinata (Indonesia) Imelda Wiguna	11–15, 6–15	Bronze

=== World Cup ===
Women's singles
Year	Venue	Opponent	Score	Result
1979	Tokyo, Japan	(Japan) Hiroe Yuki	11–7, 11–6	Gold
1980	Kyoto, Japan	(Japan) Hiroe Yuki	11–4, 12–10	Gold
1982	Stadium Negara, Kuala Lumpur, Malaysia	(Indonesia) Verawaty Fadjrin	11–2, 12–10	Gold

=== World Games ===
Women's singles
Year	Venue	Opponent	Score	Result
1981	San Jose Civic Auditorium, California, United States	(China) Zhang Ailing	4–11, 1–11	Bronze

Mixed doubles
Year	Venue	Partner	Opponent	Score	Result
1981	San Jose Civic Auditorium, California, United States	(Denmark) Steen Skovgaard	(United Kingdom) Mike Tredgett (United Kingdom) Nora Perry	15–11, 4–15, 8–15	Bronze

=== European Championships ===
Women's singles
Year	Venue	Opponent	Score	Result
1974	Vienna, Austria	(England) Gillian Gilks	6–11, 5–11	Silver
1976	Dublin, Ireland	(England) Gillian Gilks	6–11, 11–12	Silver
1978	Preston, England	(England) Jane Webster	11–4, 9–11, 11–0	Gold
1982	Böblingen, West Germany	(England) Karen Bridge	11–1, 11–9	Gold

Women's doubles
Year	Venue	Partner	Opponent	Score	Result
1972	Karlskrona, Sweden	(Denmark) Annie Bøg Jørgensen	(England) Margaret Beck (England) Julie Rickard	9–15, 7–15	Bronze
1982	Böblingen, West Germany	(Denmark) Anne Skovgaard	(England) Gillian Clark (England) Gillian Gilks	6–15, 2–15	Bronze

Mixed doubles
Year	Venue	Partner	Opponent	Score	Result
1976	Dublin, Ireland	(Denmark) Steen Skovgaard	(England) Derek Talbot (England) Gillian Gilks	15–6, 12–15, 15–17	Silver
1978	Preston, England	(Denmark) Steen Skovgaard	(England) Mike Tredgett (England) Nora Perry	9–15, 10–15	Silver

=== European Junior Championships ===
Girls' doubles
Year	Venue	Partner	Opponent	Score	Result
1971	Zimní Stadion; Gottwaldov, Czechoslovakia	(Denmark) Anne Berglund	(England) Nora Gardner (England) Barbara Giles	15–11, 15–7	Gold

Mixed doubles
Year	Venue	Partner	Opponent	Score	Result
1971	Zimní Stadion; Gottwaldov, Czechoslovakia	(Denmark) Viggo Christiansen	(England) Peter Gardner (England) Barbara Giles	13–15, 14–17	Bronze

=== International tournaments (60 titles, 27 runners-up) ===
Women's singles
Year	Tournament	Opponent	Score	Result
1971	Norwegian International	(Sweden) Eva Twedberg	5–11, 2–11	(silver) Runner-up
1973	India Open	(Sweden) Eva Twedberg	11–8, 8–11, 7–11	(silver) Runner-up
1973	USSR International	(Czechoslovakia) Alena Poboráková	11–0, 11–1	(gold) Winner
1973	Norwegian International	(Netherlands) Joke van Beusekom	2–11, 12–9, 9–12	(silver) Runner-up
1973	Nordic Championships	(Sweden) Eva Twedberg	11–2, 11–3	(gold) Winner
1974	Swedish Open	(Sweden) Eva Twedberg	11–9, 11–8	(gold) Winner
1974	Denmark Open	(Japan) Hiroe Yuki	4–11, 12–9, 9–12	(silver) Runner-up
1974	Nordic Championships	(Sweden) Anette Börjesson	11–1, 11–2	(gold) Winner
1975	Swedish Open	(Netherlands) Joke van Beusekom	11–6, 12–10	(gold) Winner
1975	Denmark Open	(Netherlands) Joke van Beusekom	11–1, 11–6	(gold) Winner
1975	Jamaica International	(Netherlands) Joke van Beusekom	11–0, 11–10	(gold) Winner
1975	Nordic Championships	(Denmark) Imre Rietveld Nielsen	11–2, 11–2	(gold) Winner
1975	Norwegian International	(Netherlands) Joke van Beusekom	8–11, 11–3, 11–3	(gold) Winner
1976	Swedish Open	(England) Gillian Gilks	11–8, 5–11, 3–11	(silver) Runner-up
1976	German Open	(England) Gillian Gilks	11–5, 6–11, 6–11	(silver) Runner-up
1976	Denmark Open	(Netherlands) Joke van Beusekom	11–4, 11–1	(gold) Winner
1976	Nordic Championships	(Denmark) Pia Nielsen	11–1, 11–4	(gold) Winner
1977	Swedish Open	(England) Gillian Gilks	11–5, 11–2	(gold) Winner
1977	All England Open	(Japan) Hiroe Yuki	11–7, 3–11, 7–11	(silver) Runner-up
1977	Nordic Championships	(Denmark) Pia Nielsen	11–2, 11–2	(gold) Winner
1978	Swedish Open	(England) Jane Webster	11–5, 11–2	(gold) Winner
1978	Denmark Open	(Japan) Atsuko Tokuda	11–4, 9–11, 11–9	(gold) Winner
1978	Nordic Championships	(Sweden) Anette Börjesson	11–2, 11–3	(gold) Winner
1979	All England Open	(Japan) Saori Kondo	13–9, 1–11, 11–8	(gold) Winner
1979	Swedish Open	(Denmark) Agnethe Juul	11–3, 11–1	(gold) Winner
1979	English Masters	(England) Gillian Gilks	12–10, 11–4	(gold) Winner
1979	Dutch Open	(England) Gillian Gilks	10–12, 9–12	(silver) Runner-up
1979	Denmark Open	(Japan) Hiroe Yuki	11–8, 7–11, 11–2	(gold) Winner
1979	Nordic Championships	(Denmark) Kirsten Larsen	11–6, 11–1	(gold) Winner
1980	All England Open	(Indonesia) Verawaty Fadjrin	11–2, 11–6	(gold) Winner
1980	Copenhagen Cup	(England) Gillian Gilks	12–9, 11–2	(gold) Winner
1980	English Masters	(Japan) Yoshiko Yonekura	11–5, 11–8	(gold) Winner
1980	Taiwan Masters	(England) Jane Webster	12–9, 11–5	(gold) Winner
1980	Nordic Championships	(Denmark) Rikke von Sørensen	11–1, 11–5	(gold) Winner
1981	All England Open	(South Korea) Hwang Sun-ai	1–11, 2–11	(silver) Runner-up
1981	English Masters	(China) Zhang Ailing	6–11, 12–11, 6–11	(silver) Runner-up
1981	Dutch Open	(England) Jane Webster	11–3, 11–3	(gold) Winner
1981	Scandinavian Cup	(China) Zhang Ailing	11–6, 12–11	(gold) Winner
1981	Denmark Open	(Japan) Saori Kondo	11–1, 11–2	(gold) Winner
1981	Nordic Championships	(Denmark) Nettie Nielsen	9–12, 11–1, 11–3	(gold) Winner
1982	Scottish Open	(England) Helen Troke	11–8, 11–4	(gold) Winner
1982	Hong Kong Open	(China) Xu Rong	4–11, 8–11	(silver) Runner-up

Women's doubles
Year	Tournament	Partner	Opponent	Score	Result
1970	Nordic Championships	(Denmark) Lizbeth von Barnekow	(Denmark) Anne Flindt (Denmark) Pernille Kaagaard	8–15, 1–15	(silver) Runner-up
1971	Norwegian International	(Denmark) Pernille Kaagaard	(Denmark) Annie Bøg Jørgensen (Denmark) Lotte Berend	15–5, 15–6	(gold) Winner
1972	Nordic Championships	(Denmark) Anne Berglund	(Denmark) Bente Flindt (Denmark) Imre Rietveld Nielsen	15–5, 17–14	(gold) Winner
1973	India Open	(Denmark) Anne Berglund	(Sweden) Eva Twedberg (Netherlands) Joke van Beusekom	1–15, 9–15	(silver) Runner-up
1973	USSR International	(Sweden) Karin Lindquist	(Soviet Union) Tatiana Antropova (Soviet Union) Tatiana Kochetkova	15–10, 15–3	(gold) Winner
1973	Norwegian International	(Denmark) Pernille Kaagaard	(Scotland) Joanne Flockhart (Scotland) Christine Stewart	12–15, 17–15, 15–6	(gold) Winner
1973	Nordic Championships	(Denmark) Lonny Bostofte	(Denmark) Pernille Kaagaard (Denmark) Ulla Strand	12–15, 10–15	(silver) Runner-up
1974	Nordic Championships	(Denmark) Imre Rietveld Nielsen	(Denmark) Anne Flindt (Denmark) Pernille Kaagaard	12–15, 15–10, 18–15	(gold) Winner
1975	Denmark Open	(Denmark) Inge Borgstrøm	(Indonesia) Theresia Widiastuti (Indonesia) Imelda Wiguna	15–3, 3–15, 15–10	(silver) Runner-up
1975	Jamaica International	(Netherlands) Joke van Beusekom	(Canada) Lesley Harris (Canada) Barbara Welch	15–4, 15–12	(gold) Winner
1975	Norwegian International	(Denmark) Inge Borgstrøm	(Sweden) Anette Börjesson (Netherlands) Joke van Beusekom	15–3, 15–7	(gold) Winner
1975	Nordic Championships	(Denmark) Inge Borgstrøm	(Denmark) Liselotte Gøttsche (Denmark) Pia Nielsen	15–2, 15–5	(gold) Winner
1976	Denmark Open	(Denmark) Inge Borgstrøm	(Netherlands) Marjan Luesken (Netherlands) Joke van Beusekom	12–15, 11–15	(silver) Runner-up
1976	Nordic Championships	(Denmark) Pia Nielsen	(Denmark) Inge Borgstrøm (Denmark) Pernille Kaagaard	10–15, 15–9, 18–16	(gold) Winner
1977	Japan Open	(Denmark) Inge Borgstrøm	(Japan) Emiko Ueno (Japan) Yoshiko Yonekura	18–13, 15–9	(gold) Winner
1977	Nordic Championships	(Denmark) Inge Borgstrøm	(Denmark) Lonny Bostofte (Denmark) Imre Rietveld Nielsen	15–10, 15–7	(gold) Winner
1978	Nordic Championships	(Denmark) Susanne Berg	(Denmark) Inge Borgstrøm (Denmark) Pia Nielsen	15–4, 15–8	(gold) Winner
1979	Swedish Open	(Netherlands) Joke van Beusekom	(England) Nora Perry (Denmark) Anne Skovgaard	15–10, 15–10	(gold) Winner
1979	Nordic Championships	(Denmark) Inge Borgstrøm	(Denmark) Kirsten Larsen (Denmark) Pia Nielsen	15–7, 15–2	(gold) Winner
1980	Taiwan Masters	(Denmark) Kirsten Larsen	(England) Nora Perry (England) Jane Webster	5–15, 7–15	(silver) Runner-up
1980	Nordic Championships	(Denmark) Pia Nielsen	(Sweden) Lena Axelsson (Sweden) Carina Andersson	15–4, 15–4	(gold) Winner
1981	Nordic Championships	(Denmark) Pia Nielsen	(Denmark) Dorte Kjær (Denmark) Nettie Nielsen	15–13, 17–14	(gold) Winner

Mixed doubles
Year	Tournament	Partner	Opponent	Score	Result
1971	Norwegian International	(Denmark) Erland Kops	(Sweden) Gert Perneklo (Sweden) Eva Twedberg	15–3, 5–15, 10–15	(silver) Runner-up
1973	USSR International	(Denmark) Elo Hansen	(West Germany) Roland Maywald (Soviet Union) Tatiana Antropova	15–9, 6–15, 15–5	(gold) Winner
1975	Jamaica International	(Denmark) Elo Hansen	(Canada) Lucio Fabris (Canada) Barbara Welch	15–10, 13–18, 15–3	(gold) Winner
1975	Nordic Championships	(Denmark) Steen Skovgaard	(Sweden) Bengt Fröman (Sweden) Karin Lindquist	15–5, 15–3	(gold) Winner
1976	Swedish Open	(Denmark) Steen Skovgaard	(England) Peter Bullivant (England) Gillian Gilks	15–6, 15–3	(gold) Winner
1976	German Open	(Denmark) Steen Skovgaard	(England) Mike Tredgett (England) Nora Gardner	9–15, 10–15	(silver) Runner-up
1976	Denmark Open	(Denmark) Steen Skovgaard	(England) David Eddy (England) Barbara Giles	15–8, 15–4	(gold) Winner
1976	Nordic Championships	(Denmark) Steen Skovgaard	(Denmark) Elo Hansen (Denmark) Pernille Kaagaard	15–0, 15–6	(gold) Winner
1977	Swedish Open	(Denmark) Steen Skovgaard	(England) Derek Talbot (England) Gillian Gilks	6–15, 9–15	(silver) Runner-up
1977	Denmark Open	(Denmark) Steen Skovgaard	(England) David Eddy (England) Barbara Giles	15–12, 15–8	(gold) Winner
1977	Nordic Championships	(Denmark) Steen Skovgaard	(Denmark) Mogens Neergaard (Denmark) Inge Borgstrøm	15–3, 15–2	(gold) Winner
1978	All England Open	(Denmark) Steen Skovgaard	(England) Mike Tredgett (England) Nora Perry	7–11, 4–11	(silver) Runner-up
1978	Swedish Open	(Denmark) Steen Skovgaard	(England) Mike Tredgett (England) Nora Perry	2–15, 9–15	(silver) Runner-up
1978	Denmark Open	(Denmark) Steen Skovgaard	(England) Mike Tredgett (England) Nora Perry	15–9, 15–11	(gold) Winner
1978	Nordic Championships	(Denmark) Steen Skovgaard	(Sweden) Lars Wengberg (Sweden) Anette Börjesson	15–11, 15–10	(gold) Winner
1979	Swedish Open	(Denmark) Steen Skovgaard	(England) Mike Tredgett (England) Nora Perry	15–12, 17–18, 16–18	(silver) Runner-up
1979	Denmark Open	(Denmark) Steen Skovgaard	(England) Ray Stevens (England) Nora Perry	12–15, 15–11, 13–15	(silver) Runner-up
1979	Nordic Championships	(Denmark) Steen Skovgaard	(Denmark) Jan Hammergaard Hansen (Denmark) Inge Borgstrøm	15–6, 15–2	(gold) Winner
1980	Denmark Open	(Denmark) Steen Skovgaard	(England) Mike Tredgett (England) Nora Perry	11–15, 8–15	(silver) Runner-up
1980	Nordic Championships	(Denmark) Steen Skovgaard	(Sweden) Lars Wengberg (Sweden) Anette Börjesson	15–6, 15–5	(gold) Winner
1981	English Masters	(Denmark) Morten Frost	(England) Mike Tredgett (England) Nora Perry	5–15, 6–15	(silver) Runner-up
1981	Nordic Championships	(Denmark) Steen Skovgaard	(Sweden) Lars Wengberg (Sweden) Anette Börjesson	17–14, 15–9	(gold) Winner
1982	Scottish Open	(Denmark) Morten Frost	(Scotland) Billy Gilliland (England) Gillian Gilks	13–18, 9–15	(silver) Runner-up
