= Pia Nielsen =

Danish badminton player

Medal record

Women's badminton

Representing Denmark

World Championships
Silver medal – second place	1983 Copenhagen	Mixed doubles
Bronze medal – third place	1977 Malmö	Women's doubles
Bronze medal – third place	1980 Jakarta	Mixed doubles

European Championships
Silver medal – second place	1980 Groningen	Women's doubles
Bronze medal – third place	1978 Preston	Women's doubles

European Mixed Team Championships
Gold medal – first place	1980 Groningen	Mixed team
Silver medal – second place	1978 Preston	Mixed team

European Junior Championships
Gold medal – first place	1975 Copenhagen	Girls' singles
Gold medal – first place	1975 Copenhagen	Mixed team
Silver medal – second place	1975 Copenhagen	Girls' doubles

Pia Nielsen is a retired female badminton player of Denmark.

== Career ==
One of Europe's better all-around female players in the late 1970s and early 1980s, Nielsen played particularly well in the IBF's first three World Championships. She won a bronze medal at the 1977 World Championships in women's doubles with Inge Borgström, a bronze medal in mixed doubles at the 1980 World Championships with Steen Fladberg, and a silver medal in mixed doubles with Fladberg in the 1983 Championships. Nielsen won several international titles on the European continent in each of badminton's three events; singles, doubles, and mixed doubles. She was a women's doubles bronze medalist at the 1978 European Championships with Inge Borgstrom when beaten by Nora Perry and Anne Statt of England in semifinals with 14–17, 11–15, and a women's doubles silver medalist in the 1980 edition of that tournament with Kirsten Larsen.

== Achievements ==
=== World Championships ===
Women's doubles
Year	Venue	Partner	Opponent	Score	Result
1977	Malmö Isstadion, Malmö, Sweden	(Denmark) Inge Borgstrøm	(Japan) Etsuko Toganoo (Japan) Emiko Ueno	8–15, 17–15, 8–15	Bronze

Mixed doubles
Year	Venue	Partner	Opponent	Score	Result
1980	Istora, Jakarta, Indonesia	(Denmark) Steen Fladberg	(England) Mike Tredgett (England) Nora Perry	8–15, 14–17	Bronze
1983	Brøndbyhallen, Copenhagen, Denmark	(Denmark) Steen Fladberg	(Sweden) Thomas Kihlström (England) Nora Perry	1–15, 11–15	Silver

=== European Championships ===
Women's doubles
Year	Venue	Partner	Opponent	Score	Result
1978	Guild Hall, Preston, England	(Denmark) Inge Borgstrøm	(England) Nora Perry (England) Anne Statt	14–17, 11–15	Bronze
1980	Martinihal, Groningen, Netherlands	(Denmark) Kirsten Larsen	(England) Nora Perry (England) Jane Webster	8–15, 13–15	Silver

=== European Junior Championships ===
Girls' singles
Year	Venue	Opponent	Score	Result
1975	Gladsaxe Sportscenter, Copenhagen, Denmark	(England) Paula Kilvington	11–2, 11–3	Gold

Girls' doubles
Year	Venue	Partner	Opponent	Score	Result
1975	Gladsaxe Sportscenter, Copenhagen, Denmark	(Denmark) Inge Borgstrøm	(Denmark) Liselotte Gøttsche (Denmark) Lilli B. Pedersen	10–15, 13–15	Silver

=== IBF World Grand Prix ===
The World Badminton Grand Prix sanctioned by International Badminton Federation (IBF) from 1983 to 2006.

Mixed doubles
Year	Tournament	Partner	Opponent	Score	Result
1983	German Open	(Denmark) Steen Fladberg	(England) Dipak Tailor (England) Gillian Clark	11–15, 15–12, 15–11	(gold) Winner

=== International tournaments ===
Women's singles
Year	Tournament	Opponent	Score	Result
1976	Nordic Championships	(Denmark) Lene Køppen	1–11, 4–11	(silver) Runner-up
1977	Nordic Championships	(Denmark) Lene Køppen	2–11, 2–11	(silver) Runner-up
1977	Norwegian International	(Denmark) Inge Borgstrøm	4–11, 6–11	(silver) Runner-up
1979	Swiss Open	(Switzerland) Liselotte Blumer	7–11, 11–7, 4–11	(silver) Runner-up
1980	German Open	(England) Sally Leadbeater	11–7, 7–11, 11–2	(gold) Winner
1980	French Open	(Denmark) Jette Bach	11–6, 11–4	(gold) Winner
1981	Norwegian International	(Denmark) Kirsten Meier	11–3, 11–6	(gold) Winner

Women's doubles
Year	Tournament	Partner	Opponent	Score	Result
1975	Nordic Championships	(Denmark) Liselotte Gøttsche	(Denmark) Inge Borgstrøm (Denmark) Lene Køppen	2–15, 11–15	(silver) Runner-up
1976	Norwegian International	(Denmark) Susanne Mølgaard	(Denmark) Inge Borgstrøm (Denmark) Pernille Kaagaard	5–15, 9–15	(silver) Runner-up
1976	Nordic Championships	(Denmark) Lene Køppen	(Denmark) Inge Borgstrøm (Denmark) Pernille Kaagaard	10–15, 15–9, 18–16	(gold) Winner
1977	Czechoslovakian International	(Denmark) Inge Borgstrøm	(East Germany) Monika Cassens (East Germany) Angela Michalowski	3–15, 6–15	(silver) Runner-up
1977	Norwegian International	(Denmark) Lonny Bostofte	(Denmark) Inge Borgstrøm (Denmark) Kirsten Meier	15–5, 18–15	(gold) Winner
1977	German Open	(Denmark) Inge Borgstrøm	(England) Barbara Giles (England) Jane Webster	10–15, 11–15	(silver) Runner-up
1978	Nordic Championships	(Denmark) Inge Borgstrøm	(Denmark) Lene Køppen (Denmark) Susanne Berg	4–15, 8–15	(silver) Runner-up
1979	Swiss Open	(Denmark) Jette Boyer	(Netherlands) Maurin Oskam (Netherlands) Karin Duijvestijn	15–10, 15–1	(gold) Winner
1979	Nordic Championships	(Denmark) Kirsten Larsen	(Denmark) Inge Borgstrøm (Denmark) Lene Køppen	7–15, 2–15	(silver) Runner-up
1980	French Open	(Denmark) Jette Boyer	(West Germany) Marieluise Zizmann (Switzerland) Liselotte Blumer	1–15, 0–15	(silver) Runner-up
1980	Nordic Championships	(Denmark) Lene Køppen	(Sweden) Lena Axelsson (Sweden) Carina Andersson	15–4, 15–4	(gold) Winner
1981	Norwegian International	(Denmark) Kirsten Meier	(Sweden) Ann-Sofi Bergman (Sweden) Lilian Johansson	15–5, 15–8	(gold) Winner
1981	Nordic Championships	(Denmark) Lene Køppen	(Denmark) Dorte Kjær (Denmark) Nettie Nielsen	15–13, 17–14	(gold) Winner

Mixed doubles
Year	Tournament	Partner	Opponent	Score	Result
1977	Norwegian International	(Denmark) Morten Frost	(Denmark) Mogens Neergaard (Denmark) Inge Borgstrøm	6–15, 3–15	(silver) Runner-up
1979	Swiss Open	(Denmark) Peter Holm	(Denmark) Kenn H. Nielsen (Denmark) Birthe Rathsach	15–5, 15–9	(gold) Winner
1980	French Open	(Denmark) Peter Holm	(Denmark) Hans Hjulmand (Denmark) Jette Boyer	13–15, 15–5, 15–4	(gold) Winner
1981	Norwegian International	(Denmark) Kenneth Larsen	(Denmark) Mark Christiansen (Denmark) Kirsten Meier	5–15, 8–15	(silver) Runner-up
1981	German Open	(Denmark) Steen Fladberg	(Netherlands) Rob Ridder (Netherlands) Marjan Ridder	12–15, 15–10, 15–10	(gold) Winner
1982	Scandinavian Cup	(Denmark) Steen Fladberg	(Sweden) Thomas Kihlström (England) Nora Perry	15–18, 12–15	(silver) Runner-up
