= 1977 IBF World Championships =

Tournament details
- Dates: 3 May – 8 May
- Edition: 1st
- Level: International
- Venue: Malmö Isstadion
- Location: Malmö, Sweden

The 1977 IBF World Championships was the inaugural badminton championships sanctioned by the International Badminton Federation. It was held in Malmö Isstadion, Malmö, Sweden from 3 to 8 May 1977.

H. M. the King of Sweden was present throughout the whole of the final day of the tournament.

== Medalists ==
=== Medal table ===
* Host nation (Sweden)

Rank	Nation	Gold	Silver	Bronze	Total
1	Denmark	3	1	1	5
2	Indonesia	1	1	1	3
3	Japan	1	0	1	2
4	England	0	2	4	6
5	Netherlands	0	1	0	1
6	Sweden*	0	0	2	2
7	Scotland	0	0	1	1
Totals (7 entries)		5	5	10	20

=== Events ===
Event	Gold	Silver	Bronze
Men's singles	(Denmark) Flemming Delfs	(Denmark) Svend Pri	(Indonesia) Iie Sumirat
Men's singles	(Denmark) Flemming Delfs	(Denmark) Svend Pri	(Sweden) Thomas Kihlström
Women's singles	(Denmark) Lene Køppen	(England) Gillian Gilks	(Japan) Hiroe Yuki
Women's singles	(Denmark) Lene Køppen	(England) Gillian Gilks	(England) Margaret Lockwood
Men's doubles	(Indonesia) Tjun Tjun (Indonesia) Johan Wahjudi	(Indonesia) Ade Chandra (Indonesia) Christian Hadinata	(Sweden) Bengt Fröman (Sweden) Thomas Kihlström
Men's doubles	(Indonesia) Tjun Tjun (Indonesia) Johan Wahjudi	(Indonesia) Ade Chandra (Indonesia) Christian Hadinata	(England) Ray Stevens (England) Mike Tredgett
Women's doubles	(Japan) Etsuko Toganoo (Japan) Emiko Ueno	(Netherlands) Marjan Ridder (Netherlands) Joke van Beusekom	(England) Margaret Lockwood (England) Nora Perry
Women's doubles	(Japan) Etsuko Toganoo (Japan) Emiko Ueno	(Netherlands) Marjan Ridder (Netherlands) Joke van Beusekom	(Denmark) Inge Borgstrøm (Denmark) Pia Nielsen
Mixed doubles	(Denmark) Steen Skovgaard (Denmark) Lene Køppen	(England) Derek Talbot (England) Gillian Gilks	(England) Mike Tredgett (England) Nora Perry
Mixed doubles	(Denmark) Steen Skovgaard (Denmark) Lene Køppen	(England) Derek Talbot (England) Gillian Gilks	(Scotland) Billy Gilliland (Scotland) Joanna Flockhart
