= 1979 Badminton World Cup =

Badminton championships

Tournament details
- Dates: 20–22 January 1979
- Edition: 1st
- Location: Tokyo, Japan

The 1979 Badminton World Cup was the 1st edition of an international tournament Badminton World Cup. The event was held in Tokyo, Japan from 20 January to 22 January 1979. Competitions for mixed doubles were not conducted. Indonesia won men's singles and men's doubles events while Japan won women's doubles and Denmark won women's singles event.

== Medalists ==
Event	Gold	Silver	Bronze
Men's singles	(Indonesia) Liem Swie King	(Indonesia) Iie Sumirat	(England) Kevin Jolly
Men's singles	(Indonesia) Liem Swie King	(Indonesia) Iie Sumirat	(Denmark) Flemming Delfs
Women's singles	(Denmark) Lene Køppen	(Japan) Hiroe Yuki	(Indonesia) Ivana Lie
Women's singles	(Denmark) Lene Køppen	(Japan) Hiroe Yuki	(Indonesia) Verawaty Wiharjo
Men's doubles	(Indonesia) Ade Chandra (Indonesia) Christian Hadinata	(Japan) Yoshitaka Iino (Japan) Masao Tsuchida	(England) Derek Talbot (England) David Eddy
Men's doubles	(Indonesia) Ade Chandra (Indonesia) Christian Hadinata	(Japan) Yoshitaka Iino (Japan) Masao Tsuchida	(Denmark) Flemming Delfs (Denmark) Steen Skovgaard
Women's doubles	(Japan) Emiko Ueno (Japan) Yoshiko Yonekura	(Indonesia) Verawaty Wiharjo (Indonesia) Imelda Wiguna	(Japan) Kazuko Sekine (Japan) Sonoe Ōtsuka
Women's doubles	(Japan) Emiko Ueno (Japan) Yoshiko Yonekura	(Indonesia) Verawaty Wiharjo (Indonesia) Imelda Wiguna	(Japan) Atsuko Tokuda (Japan) Mikiko Takada

== Men's singles ==
=== Finals ===
Semi-finals
(Indonesia) Liem Swie King	15	15
(England) Kevin Jolly	7	5
(Indonesia) Iie Sumirat	15	15
(Denmark) Flemming Delfs	7	7

Final
(Indonesia) Liem Swie King	15	15
(Indonesia) Iie Sumirat	8	8

== Women's singles ==
=== Finals ===
Semi-finals
(Denmark) Lene Køppen	12	3	11
(Indonesia) Verawaty Wiharjo	11	11	7
(Indonesia) Ivana Lie	2	3
(Japan) Hiroe Yuki	11	11

Final
(Denmark) Lene Køppen	11	11
(Japan) Hiroe Yuki	7	6

== Men's doubles ==
=== Finals ===
Semi-finals
(Indonesia) Ade Chandra (Indonesia) Christian Hadinata	15	15
(England) David Eddy (England) Derek Talbot	5	8
(Japan) Masao Tsuchida (Japan) Yoshitaka Iino	15	15
(Denmark) Flemming Delfs (Denmark) Steen Skovgaard	13	10

Final
(Indonesia) Ade Chandra (Indonesia) Christian Hadinata	15	15
(Japan) Masao Tsuchida (Japan) Yoshitaka Iino	8	3

== Women's doubles ==
=== Finals ===
Semi-finals
(Indonesia) Imelda Wiguna (Indonesia) Verawaty Wiharjo	15	18
(Japan) Atsuko Tokuda (Japan) Mikiko Takada	6	15
(Japan) Kazuko Sekine (Japan) Sonoe Ōtsuka	2	7
(Japan) Emiko Ueno (Japan) Yoshiko Yonekura	15	15

Final
(Indonesia) Imelda Wiguna (Indonesia) Verawaty Wiharjo	3	7
(Japan) Emiko Ueno (Japan) Yoshiko Yonekura	15	15
