= Etsuko Toganoo =

Japanese badminton player

Personal information
- Born: Etsuko Takenaka 竹中悦子; 6 January 1950 (age 76) Kahoku, Ishikawa, Japan
- Height: 1.63 m (5 ft 4 in)
- Weight: 56 kg (123 lb)

Sport
- Country: Japan
- Sport: Badminton
- Handedness: Right
- Event: Women's singles and doubles
Medal record
Women's badminton
Representing Japan
World Championships
Gold medal – first place	1977 Malmö	Women's doubles
Uber Cup
Gold medal – first place	1972 Tokyo	Women's team
Silver medal – second place	1975 Jakarta	Women's team
Asian Games
Gold medal – first place	1970 Bangkok	Women's doubles
Gold medal – first place	1970 Bangkok	Women's team
Bronze medal – third place	1970 Bangkok	Mixed doubles
Bronze medal – third place	1974 Tehran	Women's team
Asian Championships
Silver medal – second place	1976 Hyderabad	Mixed doubles

Etsuko Toganoo (栂野尾 悦子, Toganoo Etsuko; née Takenaka; born 6 January 1950) is a retired Japanese badminton player noted for her consistency and impassive demeanor, who won numerous international titles during the 1970s. Along with her contemporaries Hiroe Yuki (Niinuma) and Noriko Takagi (Nakayama), she is one of three Japanese women to have won both singles (1970) and doubles (1972, 1973, 1975, 1977) at the prestigious All-England Championships. These three helped Japan to dominate the Uber Cup (women's world team) competition from the mid-1960s to the early 1980s. In 1977 Mrs. Toganoo won the women's doubles with Emiko Ueno at the first IBF World Championships.

== Awards and nominations ==
Award	Year	Category	Result	Ref.
Asahi Sports Award	1969	Victory at the 1969 Uber Cup with the Japanese women's national team	Won	
Asahi Sports Award	1977	Victory at the 1st World Championships and the 1977 All England Open Championships in women's doubles	Won	

== Achievements ==
=== World Championships ===
Women's doubles
Year	Venue	Partner	Opponent	Score	Result
1977	Malmö Isstadion; Malmö, Sweden	(Japan) Emiko Ueno	(Netherlands) Marjan Ridder (Netherlands) Joke van Beusekom	15–10, 15–11	Gold

=== Asian Games ===
Women's doubles
Year	Venue	Partner	Opponent	Score	Result
1970	Kittikachorn Stadium; Bangkok, Thailand	(Japan) Machiko Aizawa	(Indonesia) Retno Kustijah (Indonesia) Nurhaena	15–11, 15–6	Gold

Mixed doubles
Year	Venue	Partner	Opponent	Score	Result
1970	Kittikachorn Stadium; Bangkok, Thailand	(Japan) Ippei Kojima	(Malaysia) Ng Boon Bee (Malaysia) Sylvia Ng	–, –	Bronze

=== Asian Championships ===
Mixed doubles
Year	Venue	Partner	Opponent	Score	Result
1976	Lal Bahadur Shastri Stadium, Hyderabad, India	(Japan) Shoichi Toganoo	(China) Fang Kaixiang (China) He Cuiling	12–15, 12–15	Silver

=== International tournament (10 titles, 3 runners-up) ===
Women's singles
Year	Tournament	Opponent	Score	Result	Ref.
1970	Denmark Open	(Sweden) Eva Twedberg	2–11, 2–11	(silver) Runner-up	
1970	U.S. Open	(United States) Tyna Barinaga	11–5, 12–9	(gold) Winner	
1970	All England Open	(England) Heather Nielsen	11–3, 11–4	(gold) Winner	

Women's doubles
Year	Tournament	Partner	Opponent	Score	Result
1968	Malaysia Open	(Japan) Machiko Aizawa	(Japan) Noriko Takagi (Japan) Hiroe Yuki	15–11, 15–10	(gold) Winner
1970	Denmark Open	(Japan) Machiko Aizawa	(Japan) Hiroe Amano (Japan) Noriko Takagi	15–17, 15–12, 15–9	(gold) Winner
1970	U.S. Open	(Japan) Machiko Aizawa	(England) Margaret Boxall (England) Susan Whetnall	15–10, 15–11	(gold) Winner
1971	Denmark Open	(Japan) Machiko Aizawa	(Japan) Noriko Takagi (Japan) Hiroe Yuki	10–15, 3–15	(silver) Runner-up
1972	Denmark Open	(Japan) Machiko Aizawa	(Japan) Noriko Takagi (Japan) Hiroe Yuki	11–15, 15–11, 15–17	(silver) Runner-up
1972	All England Open	(Japan) Machiko Aizawa	(England) Margaret Beck (England) Julie Rickard	9–15, 15–8, 15–12	(gold) Winner
1973	All England Open	(Japan) Machiko Aizawa	(England) Margaret Beck (England) Gillian Gilks	15–10, 10–15, 15–11	(gold) Winner
1974	Denmark Open	(Japan) Machiko Aizawa	(Denmark) Pernille Kaagaard (Denmark) Ulla Strand	18–15, 15–12	(gold) Winner
1975	All England Open	(Japan) Machiko Aizawa	(Indonesia) Theresia Widiastuti (Indonesia) Imelda Wiguna	15–11, 17–14	(gold) Winner
1977	All England Open	(Japan) Emiko Ueno	(England) Margaret Lockwood (England) Nora Perry	7–15, 15–3, 15–7	(gold) Winner

=== Invitational tournament ===
Women's doubles
Year	Tournament	Partner	Opponent	Score	Result
1974 (Glasgow)	World Invitational Championships	(Japan) Machiko Aizawa	(England) Margaret Beck (England) Nora Perry	15–7, 15–8	Gold
