= Emiko Ueno =

Japanese badminton player

Personal information
- Born: 3 September 1957 (age 69) Neyagawa, Osaka, Japan

Sport
- Country: Japan
- Sport: Badminton
Medal record
Women's badminton
Representing Japan
World Championships
Gold medal – first place	1977 Malmö	Women's doubles
World Cup
Gold medal – first place	1979 Tokyo	Women's doubles
Uber Cup
Gold medal – first place	1978 Auckland	Women's team
Asian Games
Bronze medal – third place	1978 Bangkok	Women's team

Emiko Ueno (植野恵美子, Ueno Emiko; born on September 3, 1957, in Neyagawa) is a retired female badminton player of Japan, who specialized in doubles.

== Career ==
In 1977 she won both the All-England Championships and IBF World Championships in women's doubles with Etsuko Toganoo. In 1978 she was a member of Japan's world champion Uber Cup (women's international) team. She was also the gold medalist in 1979 World Cup in Women's doubles with partner Yoshiko Yonekura.

== Awards and nominations ==
Award	Year	Category	Result	Ref.
Asahi Sports Award	1977	Victory at the 1st World Championships and the 1977 All England Open Championships in women's doubles	Won	
Asahi Sports Award	1978	Victory at the 1978 Uber Cup with the Japanese women's national team	Won	

== Achievements ==
=== World Championships ===
Women's doubles
Year	Venue	Partner	Opponent	Score	Result
1977	Malmö Isstadion, Malmö, Sweden	(Japan) Etsuko Toganoo	(Netherlands) Marjan Ridder (Netherlands) Joke van Beusekom	15–10, 15–11	Gold

=== World Cup ===
Women's doubles
Year	Venue	Partner	Opponent	Score	Result
1979	Yoyogi National Stadium, Tokyo, Japan	(Japan) Yoshiko Yonekura	(Indonesia) Verawaty Fadjrin (Indonesia) Imelda Wiguna	15–3, 15–7	Gold

=== International tournament ===
Women's doubles
Year	Tournament	Partner	Opponent	Score	Result
1977	Japan Open	(Japan) Yoshiko Yonekura	(Denmark) Inge Borgstrøm (Denmark) Lene Køppen	13–18, 9–15	(silver) Runner-up
1977	All England Open	(Japan) Etsuko Toganoo	(England) Margaret Lockwood (England) Nora Perry	7–15, 15–3, 15–7	(gold) Winner
1978	Denmark Open	(Japan) Yoshiko Yonekura	(Indonesia) Imelda Wiguna (Indonesia) Verawaty Wiharjo	8–15, 15–8, 4–15	(silver) Runner-up
1978	All England Open	(Japan) Yoshiko Yonekura	(Japan) Atsuko Tokuda (Japan) Mikiko Takada	16–18, 6–15	(silver) Runner-up
