= Yoshiko Yonekura =

Japanese badminton player

Medal record

Women's badminton

Representing Japan

World Championships
Bronze medal – third place	1980 Jakarta	Women's doubles

World Cup
Gold medal – first place	1979 Tokyo	Women's doubles
Gold medal – first place	1980 Kyoto	Women's doubles
Bronze medal – third place	1980 Kyoto	Women's singles

Uber Cup
Gold medal – first place	1978 Auckland	Women's team
Gold medal – first place	1981 Tokyo	Women's team

Asian Games
Silver medal – second place	1982 New Delhi	Women's team
Silver medal – second place	1986 Seoul	Women's team
Bronze medal – third place	1982 New Delhi	Women's doubles
Bronze medal – third place	1978 Bangkok	Women's team

Yoshiko Yonekura (米倉 よし子, Yonekura Yoshiko; later, Yoshiko Tago) is a retired female badminton player of Japan who won Japanese national and international titles in the late 1970s and the 1980s. She is the mother of badminton player Kenichi Tago.

== Career ==
In 1980 she won women's singles at the Danish Open, women's singles and doubles at the Swedish Open, and a bronze medal at the 1980 IBF World Championships in women's doubles with Atsuko Tokuda. She was a member of world champion Japanese Uber Cup (women's international) teams in 1978 and in 1981. She was also the champion at 1979 Badminton World Cup in women's doubles category with partner Emiko Ueno.

== Awards and nominations ==
Award	Year	Category	Result	Ref.
Asahi Sports Award	1978	Victory at the 1978 Uber Cup with the Japanese women's national team	Won	
Asahi Sports Award	1981	Victory at the 1981 Uber Cup with the Japanese women's national team	Won	

== Achievements ==
=== World Championships ===
Women's doubles
Year	Venue	Partner	Opponent	Score	Result
1980	Istora Senayan, Jakarta, Indonesia	(Japan) Atsuko Tokuda	(England) Nora Perry (England) Jane Webster	12–15, 17–15, 6–15	Bronze

=== World Cup ===
Women's singles
Year	Venue	Opponent	Score	Result
1980	Kyoto Prefectural Gymnasium, Kyoto, Japan	(Denmark) Lene Køppen	8–11, 5–11	Bronze

Women's doubles
Year	Venue	Partner	Opponent	Score	Result
1979	Yoyogi National Stadium, Tokyo, Japan	(Japan) Emiko Ueno	(Indonesia) Verawaty Fadjrin (Indonesia) Imelda Wiguna	15–3, 15–7	Gold
1980	Kyoto Prefectural Gymnasium, Kyoto, Japan	(Japan) Atsuko Tokuda	(Indonesia) Verawaty Fadjrin (Indonesia) Imelda Wiguna	15–12, 17–14	Gold

=== Asian Games ===
Women's doubles
Year	Venue	Partner	Opponent	Score	Result
1982	Indraprastha Indoor Stadium, New Delhi, India	(Japan) Atsuko Tokuda	(South Korea) Kim Yun-ja (South Korea) Yoo Sang-hee	12–15, 8–15	Bronze

=== IBF World Grand Prix ===
The World Badminton Grand Prix sanctioned by International Badminton Federation (IBF) from 1983 to 2006.

Women's doubles
Year	Tournament	Partner	Opponent	Score	Result
1983	Scandinavian Cup	(Japan) Atsuko Tokuda	(China) Chen Ruizhen (China) Zheng Jian	15–12, 15–8	(gold) Winner
1984	Denmark Open	(Japan) Atsuko Tokuda	(South Korea) Kim Yun-ja (South Korea) Yoo Sang-hee	15–3, 5–15, 13–15	(silver) Runner-up
1984	Swedish Open	(Japan) Atsuko Tokuda	(South Korea) Kim Yun-ja (South Korea) Yoo Sang-hee	11–15, 15–8, 9–15	(silver) Runner-up
1987	Denmark Open	(Japan) Atsuko Tokuda	(England) Gillian Clark (England) Gillian Gowers	15–7, 15–10	(gold) Winner

=== International tournaments ===
Women's singles
Year	Tournament	Opponent	Score	Result
1980	Denmark Open	(Indonesia) Ivana Lie	11–8, 12–11	(gold) Winner
1980	Swedish Open	(Indonesia) Ivana Lie	10–12, 11–5, 11–8	(gold) Winner
1980	English Masters	(Denmark) Lene Køppen	5–11, 8–11	(silver) Runner-up
1982	India Open	(England) Jane Webster	3–11, 5–11	(silver) Runner-up

Women's doubles
Year	Tournament	Partner	Opponent	Score	Result
1977	Japan Open	(Japan) Emiko Ueno	(Denmark) Inge Borgstrøm (Denmark) Lene Køppen	13–18, 9–15	(silver) Runner-up
1978	Denmark Open	(Japan) Emiko Ueno	(Indonesia) Verawaty Wiharjo (Indonesia) Imelda Wiguna	8–15, 15–8, 4–15	(silver) Runner-up
1978	All England Open	(Japan) Emiko Ueno	(Japan) Atsuko Tokuda (Japan) Mikiko Takada	16–18, 6–15	(silver) Runner-up
1979	English Masters	(Japan) Atsuko Tokuda	(England) Nora Perry (England) Jane Webster	2–15, 15–8, 10–15	(silver) Runner-up
1980	Denmark Open	(Japan) Atsuko Tokuda	(England) Gillian Gilks (England) Nora Perry	15–18, 15–9, 9–15	(silver) Runner-up
1980	Swedish Open	(Japan) Atsuko Tokuda	(England) Karen Bridge (England) Barbara Sutton	15–8, 15–6	(gold) Winner
1980	All England Open	(Japan) Atsuko Tokuda	(England) Gillian Gilks (England) Nora Perry	15–11, 7–15, 6–15	(silver) Runner-up
1980	English Masters	(Japan) Atsuko Tokuda	(England) Nora Perry (England) Jane Webster	18–14, 6–15, 15–12	(gold) Winner
1981	Denmark Open	(Japan) Atsuko Tokuda	(England) Nora Perry (England) Jane Webster	12–15, 15–18	(silver) Runner-up
1981	Japan Open	(Japan) Atsuko Tokuda	(England) Nora Perry (England) Jane Webster	15–6, 7–15, 15–8	(gold) Winner
1981	English Masters	(England) Gillian Gilks	(China) Liu Xia (China) Zhang Ailing	10–15, 15–3, 6–15	(silver) Runner-up
1982	Indonesia Open	(Japan) Atsuko Tokuda	(England) Gillian Clark (England) Gillian Gilks	14–17, 17–14, 12–15	(silver) Runner-up
1982	Scandinavian Cup	(Japan) Atsuko Tokuda	(England) Nora Perry (England) Jane Webster	15–11, 9–15, 4–15	(silver) Runner-up
