= Hiroe Yuki =

Japanese badminton player (born 1948)

Hiroe Niinuma

Personal information
- Born: Hiroe Yuki 湯木 博恵; 15 November 1948 Kaita, Hiroshima Prefecture, Japan
- Died: 7 September 2011 (aged 62) Tokyo, Japan
- Height: 1.61 m (5 ft 3 in)
- Weight: 60 kg (132 lb)

Sport
- Country: Japan
- Sport: Badminton
- Handedness: Right
- Coached by: Kiyoshi Mori
- Retired: 1981
- Event: Women's singles

Women's singles
- BWF profile
Medal record
Women's badminton
Representing Japan
World Championships
Bronze medal – third place	1977 Malmö	Women's singles
World Cup
Silver medal – second place	1979 Tokyo	Women's singles
Silver medal – second place	1980 Kyoto	Women's singles
Uber Cup
Gold medal – first place	1969 Tokyo	Women's team
Gold medal – first place	1972 Tokyo	Women's team
Gold medal – first place	1978 Auckland	Women's team
Silver medal – second place	1975 Jakarta	Women's team
Asian Games
Gold medal – first place	1970 Bangkok	Women's singles
Gold medal – first place	1970 Bangkok	Women's team
Bronze medal – third place	1974 Tehran	Women's singles
Bronze medal – third place	1974 Tehran	Women's team
Bronze medal – third place	1978 Bangkok	Women's team

Hiroe Niinuma (新沼 博江, Niinuma Hiroe; née Yuki) (15 November 1948 – 7 September 2011 in Tokyo) was a Japanese badminton player. She won numerous major international titles from the late 1960s to the late 1970s. She is recognized as one of Japan's most successful badminton players, having won the women's singles title at the All England Open four times. In 2002, she became the first Japanese player to be inducted into the Badminton Hall of Fame.

== Early life ==
Yuki was born in Hiroshima Prefecture and raised in Okayama Prefecture, where she began playing badminton during junior high school. She won her first national inter-high school championship while attending Sanyo Girls' High School. She subsequently enrolled at the Japan Women's College of Physical Education and later played for the Kawasaki corporate team.

== Career ==
She became a core member of the Japanese national team, helping the country win the Uber Cup five times between 1966 and 1981.

Yuki (left) with runner-up Noriko Takagi after the 1969 All England women's singles final, where Yuki became the first Japanese player to win an All England title.

Before the establishment of the World Championships in 1977, the All England Open was considered the premier individual tournament in the sport. In 1969, while still a university student, Yuki made history by becoming the first Japanese player to win an All England Open title in any discipline when she captured the women's singles crown. She went on to dominate the event, winning the title again in 1974, 1975, and 1977. In 1971, she also won the All England Open women's doubles title partnered with Noriko Takagi. Her 1969 singles victory and 1971 doubles victory cemented her legacy as the first Asian woman to claim these titles at the venerated Wembley Arena.

During a European tour in March 1970, Yuki suffered a major injury shortly before she was scheduled to defend her All England Open title. On 10 March, while competing in the women's doubles at the Denmark Open partner with West Germany's Marieluise Wackerow, she tore her left Achilles tendon. Following surgery and a two-week hospitalization in Denmark, she returned to Japan for rehabilitation. Her recovery progressed quickly; her cast was removed in late April, and she resumed international competition by December 1970, winning the women's singles gold medal at the Asian Games in Bangkok.

At the 1972 Summer Olympics in Munich, where badminton was featured as a demonstration sport, Yuki won a bronze medal in the women's singles. Towards the end of her competitive career, she also earned a women's singles bronze medal at the inaugural IBF World Championships in 1977. She retired from competitive play in 1981.

== Personal life and death ==
Following her retirement, Yuki served as a coach for her alma mater, the Japan Women's College of Physical Education, and its affiliated Nikaido High School. She met the popular Japanese enka singer Kenji Niinuma after being invited to coach a badminton club in his hometown of Ofunato, Iwate. After five years of dating, Yuki and Niinuma announced their engagement on 21 January 1986 and married in March that year, after which she became known as Hiroe Niinuma. They later had one son and one daughter. She also served as a strengthening committee member for the Nippon Badminton Association.

In 2004, Niinuma was diagnosed with breast cancer and underwent surgery. Although she recovered and continued to play badminton recreationally, she later developed lung cancer. She died at a hospital in Tokyo on 7 September 2011, at the age of 62.

== Honours and awards ==
- Asahi: Sports Award with the Uber Cup team (1969).
- Asahi: Sports Award for winning All England (1977).
- Asahi: Sports Award with the Uber Cup team (1978).
- Badminton Hall of Fame: Inducted in 2002.

== Achievements ==
=== Olympic Games (demonstration) ===
Women's singles
Year	Venue	Opponent	Score	Result
1972	Volleyballhalle, Munich, West Germany	(Indonesia) Utami Dewi	5–11, 9–11	Bronze

=== World Championships ===
Women's singles
Year	Venue	Opponent	Score	Result
1977	Malmö Isstadion, Malmö, Sweden	(England) Gillian Gilks	4–11, 7–11	Bronze

=== World Cup ===
Women's singles
Year	Venue	Opponent	Score	Result
1979	Yoyogi National Stadium, Tokyo, Japan	(Denmark) Lene Køppen	7–11, 6–11	Silver
1980	Kyoto Prefectural Gymnasium, Kyoto, Japan	(Denmark) Lene Køppen	4–11, 10–12	Silver

=== Asian Games ===
Women's singles
Year	Venue	Opponent	Score	Result
1970	Kittikachorn Stadium, Bangkok, Thailand	(Thailand) Thongkam Kingmanee	12–9, 11–8	Gold
1974	Amjadieh Sport Complex, Tehran, Iran	(South Korea) Oh Youn-han	11–4, 11–2	Bronze

=== International tournaments ===
Women's singles
Year	Tournament	Opponent	Score	Result
1968	Singapore Open	(Japan) Noriko Takagi	7–11, 12–10, 4–11	(silver) Runner-up
1968	Malaysia Open	(Sweden) Eva Twedberg	11–1, 11–6	(gold) Winner
1969	All England Open	(Japan) Noriko Takagi	11–5, 11–5	(gold) Winner
1969	Denmark Open	(Japan) Noriko Takagi	12–10, 11–2	(gold) Winner
1971	U. S. Open	(Japan) Noriko Takagi	5–11, 9–11	(silver) Runner-up
1971	Canada Open	(Japan) Noriko Takagi	12–9, 11–0	(gold) Winner
1971	Denmark Open	(Japan) Noriko Takagi	7–11, 4–11	(silver) Runner-up
1972	All England Open	(Japan) Noriko Nakayama	5–11, 11–3, 7–11	(silver) Runner-up
1973	Denmark Open	(Denmark) Imre Rietveld	11–7, 11–6	(gold) Winner
1974	All England Open	(England) Gillian Gilks	11–6, 12–11	(gold) Winner
1974	Denmark Open	(Denmark) Lene Køppen	11–4, 9–12, 12–9	(gold) Winner
1975	All England Open	(England) Gillian Gilks	11–5, 11–9	(gold) Winner
1977	All England Open	(Denmark) Lene Køppen	7–11, 11–3, 11–7	(gold) Winner
1977	Denmark Open	(Netherlands) Joke van Beusekom	11–4, 11–8	(gold) Winner
1979	Denmark Open	(Denmark) Lene Køppen	8–11, 11–7, 2–11	(silver) Runner-up
1981	German Open	(England) Sally Leadbeater	12–11, 11–9	(gold) Winner

Women's doubles
Year	Tournament	Partner	Opponent	Score	Result
1968	Malaysia Open	(Japan) Noriko Takagi	(Japan) Machiko Aizawa (Japan) Etsuko Takenaka	11–15, 10–15	(silver) Runner-up
1968	Singapore Open	(Japan) Noriko Takagi	(Malaysia) Rosalind Singha Ang (Sweden) Eva Twedberg	15–6, 15–11	(gold) Winner
1969	Denmark Open	(Japan) Noriko Takagi	(Japan) Hiroe Amano (Japan) Tomoko Takahashi	15–9, 15–9	(gold) Winner
1971	All England Open	(Japan) Noriko Takagi	(England) Gillian Gilks (United States) Judy Hashman	15–10, 18–13	(gold) Winner
1971	U. S. Open	(Japan) Noriko Takagi	(United States) Ethel Marshall (United States) Dorothy O'Neil	15–8, 15–2	(gold) Winner
1971	Canada Open	(Japan) Noriko Takagi	(Japan) Machiko Aizawa (Japan) Etsuko Takenaka	9–1 retired	(gold) Winner
1971	Denmark Open	(Japan) Noriko Takagi	(Japan) Machiko Aizawa (Japan) Etsuko Takenaka	15–10, 15–3	(gold) Winner
1972	Denmark Open	(Japan) Noriko Nakayama	(Japan) Machiko Aizawa (Japan) Etsuko Takenaka	15–11, 11–15, 17–15	(gold) Winner

=== Invitational tournament ===
Women's singles
Year	Tournament	Opponent	Score	Result
1974 (Glasgow)	World Invitational Championships	(Denmark) Lene Køppen	10–12, 11–6, 12–9	Gold
1974 (Jakarta)	World Invitational Championships	(Japan) Etsuko Takenaka	11–6, 10–12, 11–2	Bronze
1975	World Invitational Championships	(Indonesia) Taty Sumirah	11–8, 11–7	Gold
