= Imelda Wiguna =

Indonesian badminton player

Personal information
- Born: Mustika Imelda Wiguna Kurniawan; 12 October 1951 (age 75) Slawi, Tegal, Indonesia

Sport
- Country: Indonesia
- Sport: Badminton

Women's & mixed doubles
- Highest ranking: 1 (WD with Verawaty Fadjrin in 1979); 1 (XD with Christian Hadinata in 1979)
Medal record
Women's badminton
Representing Indonesia
World Championships
Gold medal – first place	1980 Jakarta	Mixed doubles
Silver medal – second place	1980 Jakarta	Women's doubles
World Games
Bronze medal – third place	1981 Santa Clara	Mixed doubles
World Cup
Silver medal – second place	1979 Tokyo	Women's doubles
Silver medal – second place	1980 Kyoto	Women's doubles
Silver medal – second place	1986 Bandung & Jakarta	Women's doubles
Bronze medal – third place	1985 Jakarta	Women's doubles
Bronze medal – third place	1984 Jakarta	Mixed doubles
Uber Cup
Gold medal – first place	1975 Jakarta	Women's team
Silver medal – second place	1978 Auckland	Women's team
Silver medal – second place	1981 Tokyo	Women's team
Silver medal – second place	1986 Jakarta	Women's team
Asian Games
Gold medal – first place	1978 Bangkok	Women's doubles
Silver medal – second place	1974 Tehran	Women's team
Silver medal – second place	1978 Bangkok	Women's team
Bronze medal – third place	1974 Tehran	Women's doubles
Bronze medal – third place	1978 Bangkok	Mixed doubles
Bronze medal – third place	1986 Seoul	Women's doubles
Bronze medal – third place	1986 Seoul	Women's team

Imelda Wiguna (also known as Imelda Wigoena, Chinese: 黃祖金, born 12 October 1951) is an Indonesian badminton player who played at the world class level from the mid-1970s through the mid-1980s.

== Career ==
A doubles specialist, Wiguna's two most impressive years in badminton were 1979 and 1980. In 1979 she won both doubles events, women's doubles with Verawaty Wiharjo and mixed doubles with Christian Hadinata, at the All England Championships. The following year she reached the final of both events at the then triennial IBF World Championships in Jakarta, losing the women's doubles with Wiharjo but winning the mixed doubles with Hadinata. Thereafter, though Wiguna continued to play at a high level, the demands of motherhood and strong competition from mainland Chinese players made winning the biggest tournaments more difficult. Her other titles included women's doubles at the Asian Games (1978), the Danish Open (1978), the Canadian Open (1979), and the Southeast Asian Games (1979, 1985); and mixed doubles at the Canadian Open (1979), and the Southeast Asian Games (1979, 1981, 1985).

Wiguna played in five consecutive Uber Cup (women's international team) competitions for Indonesia between 1974 and 1986. She helped her nation to capture its first world title (over Japan) in 1975, and to reach the final round in 1978, 1981, and 1986.

== Achievements ==
=== World Games ===
Mixed doubles

Year	Venue	Partner	Opponent	Score	Result
1981	San Jose Civic Auditorium, California, United States	(Indonesia) Christian Hadinata	(Sweden) Thomas Kihlström (United Kingdom) Gillian Gilks	8–15, 8–15	Bronze

=== World Championships ===
Women's doubles

Year	Venue	Partner	Opponent	Score	Result
1980	Istora Senayan, Jakarta, Indonesia	(Indonesia) Verawaty Wiharjo	(England) Nora Perry (England) Jane Webster	12–15, 3–15	Silver

Mixed doubles

Year	Venue	Partner	Opponent	Score	Result
1980	Istora Senayan, Jakarta, Indonesia	(Indonesia) Christian Hadinata	(England) Mike Tredgett (England) Nora Perry	15–12, 15–4	Gold

=== World Cup ===
Women's doubles

Year	Venue	Partner	Opponent	Score	Result
1979	Tokyo, Japan	(Indonesia) Verawaty Wiharjo	(Japan) Emiko Ueno (Japan) Yoshiko Yonekura	3–15, 7–15	Silver
1980	Kyoto, Japan	(Indonesia) Verawaty Wiharjo	(Japan) Atsuko Tokuda (Japan) Yoshiko Yonekura	12–15, 14–17	Silver
1985	Istora Senayan, Jakarta, Indonesia	(Indonesia) Rosiana Tendean	(China) Lin Ying (China) Wu Dixi	5–15, 17–14, 10–15	Bronze
1986	Istora Senayan, Jakarta, Indonesia	(Indonesia) Rosiana Tendean	(China) Han Aiping (China) Li Lingwei	7–15, 7–15	Silver

=== Asian Games ===
Women's doubles

Year	Venue	Partner	Opponent	Score	Result
1974	Amjadieh Sport Complex, Tehran, Iran	(Indonesia) Theresia Widiastuti	(Indonesia) Minarni (Indonesia) Regina Masli		Bronze
1978	Indoor Stadium Huamark, Bangkok, Thailand	(Indonesia) Verawaty Wiharjo	(China) Qiu Yufang (China) Zheng Huiming	17–14, 15–4	Gold
1986	Olympic Gymnastics Arena, Seoul, South Korea	(Indonesia) Rosiana Tendean	(South Korea) Kim Yun-ja (South Korea) Yoo Sang-hee	12–15, 13–15	Bronze

Mixed doubles

Year	Venue	Partner	Opponent	Score	Result
1978	Indoor Stadium Huamark, Bangkok, Thailand	(Indonesia) Christian Hadinata	(China) Tang Xianhu (China) Zhang Ailing	15–12, 7–15, 5–15	Bronze

=== SEA Games ===
Women's doubles

Year	Venue	Partner	Opponent	Score	Result
1985	Chulalongkorn University Indoor Stadium, Bangkok, Thailand	(Indonesia) Rosiana Tendean	(Indonesia) Verawaty Fadjrin (Indonesia) Elizabeth Latief	15–2, 15–4	Gold

Mixed doubles

Year	Venue	Partner	Opponent	Score	Result
1979	Istora Senayan, Jakarta, Indonesia	(Indonesia) Christian Hadinata	(Indonesia) Hariamanto Kartono (Indonesia) Tjan So Gwan	18–16, 15–2	Gold
1985	Chulalongkorn University Indoor Stadium, Bangkok, Thailand	(Indonesia) Christian Hadinata	(Indonesia) Chafidz Yusuf (Indonesia) Rosiana Tendean	15–9,15–5	Gold

=== IBF World Grand Prix ===
The World Badminton Grand Prix has been sanctioned by the International Badminton Federation from 1983 to 2006.

Women's doubles

Year	Tournament	Partner	Opponent	Score	Result
1985	Thailand Open	(Indonesia) Rosiana Tendean	(China) Guan Weizhen (China) Wu Jianqiu	1–15, 2–15	(silver) Runner-up
1986	Indonesia Open	(Indonesia) Rosiana Tendean	(Indonesia) Ivana Lie (Indonesia) Verawaty Fadjrin	15–17, 2–15	(silver) Runner-up

Mixed doubles

Year	Tournament	Partner	Opponent	Score	Result
1984	Denmark Open	(Scotland) Billy Gilliland	(England) Dipak Tailor (England) Nora Perry	ret	(silver) Runner-up

=== International tournaments ===
Women's singles

Year	Tournament	Opponent	Score	Result
1980	Auckland International	(Indonesia) Tjan So Gwan	11–9, 2–11, 6–11	(silver) Runner-up

Women's doubles

Year	Tournament	Partner	Opponent	Score	Result
1975	All England Open	(Indonesia) Theresia Widiastuti	(Japan) Machiko Aizawa (Japan) Etsuko Takenaka	15–12, 12–15, 9–15	(silver) Runner-up
1975	Denmark Open	(Indonesia) Theresia Widiastuti	(Denmark) Lene Køppen (Denmark) Inge Borgstrøm	3–15, 15–3, 15–10	(gold) Winner
1978	Denmark Open	(Indonesia) Verawaty Wiharjo	(Japan) Emiko Ueno (Japan) Yoshiko Yonekura	15–8, 8–15, 15–4	(gold) Winner
1979	All England Open	(Indonesia) Verawaty Wiharjo	(Japan) Mikiko Takada (Japan) Atsuko Tokuda	15–3, 10–15, 15–5	(gold) Winner
1979	Auckland International	(Indonesia) Verawaty Wiharjo	(England) Karen Bridge (Indonesia) Ivana Lie	15–7, 15–13	(gold) Winner
1979	Canadian Open	(Indonesia) Verawaty Wiharjo	(Japan) Mikiko Takada (Japan) Atsuko Tokuda	7–15, 15–12, 15–7	(gold) Winner
1979	Randers Open	(Indonesia) Verawaty Wiharjo	(England) Gillian Gilks (England) Nora Perry	4–15, 8–15	(silver) Runner-up
1980	Auckland International	(Indonesia) Tjan So Gwan	(Australia) Sue Daly (Indonesia) Taty Sumirah	15–2, 15–4	(gold) Winner

Mixed doubles

Year	Tournament	Partner	Opponent	Score	Result
1979	All England Open	(Indonesia) Christian Hadinata	(England) Mike Tredgett (England) Nora Perry	15–1, 18–17	(gold) Winner
1979	Canadian Open	(Indonesia) Christian Hadinata	(Indonesia) Ade Chandra (Indonesia) Verawaty Wiharjo	15–6, 15–1	(gold) Winner
1980	All England Open	(Indonesia) Christian Hadinata	(England) Mike Tredgett (England) Nora Perry	13–18, 10–15	(silver) Runner-up
1981	All England	(Indonesia) Christian Hadinata	(England) Mike Tredgett (England) Nora Perry	15–10, 14–18, 10–15	(silver) Runner-up
1981	Denmark Open	(Indonesia) Christian Hadinata	(England) Mike Tredgett (England) Nora Perry	2–15, 2–15	(silver) Runner-up

=== Other tournaments ===
Women's doubles

Year	Tournament	Partner	Opponent	Score	Result	Ref
1983	Veterans Tournament (30+)	(Indonesia) Minarni	(Japan) Noriko Nakayama (Japan) Hiroe Amano	15–3, ret	(gold) Winner	

Mixed doubles

Year	Tournament	Partner	Opponent	Score	Result	Ref
1983	Veterans Tournament (30+)	(England) Derek Talbot	(Malaysia) Koay Kar Lin (Malaysia) Yap Hei Lin	15–9, 15–8	(gold) Winner	
