= Mikiko Takada =

Japanese badminton player

Medal record

Women's badminton

Representing Japan

World Cup
Bronze medal – third place	1979 Tokyo	Women's doubles
Bronze medal – third place	1980 Kyoto	Women's doubles

Uber Cup
Gold medal – first place	1978 Auckland	Women's team
Gold medal – first place	1981 Tokyo	Women's team

Asian Games
Bronze medal – third place	1978 Bangkok	Women's team

Mikiko Takada (高田幹子/たかだみきこ, Takada Mikiko; born 1955) later, Mikiko Ue (宇卫幹子) is a former Japanese badminton player.

== Career ==
Takada won the Japanese National Badminton Championships back to back in 1977 and 1978 with her partner, Atsuko Tokuda. Takada and Tokuda won the All England Open Badminton Championships women's doubles title in 1978. The pair managed to get back to the final in 1979 but lost to the Indonesian pair of Imelda Wiguna and Verawaty Wiharjo. Takada and Tokuda also won the Denmark Open in 1979. In the Badminton World Cup, Takada won two women's doubles bronze medals, one with Tokuda and another one with Saori Kondo.

Takada helped Japan's team to win consecutive Uber Cups in 1978 and 1981. Paired with Tokuda and Kondo respectively, she lost only one match in the 1978 and 1981 challenge rounds in four matches against Indonesia.In the first ever official IBF world rankings released in 1978 Takada and Tokuda were the first women's doubles team to be ranked number one.

== Awards and nominations ==
Award	Year	Category	Result	Ref.
Asahi Sports Award	1978	Victory at the 1978 Uber Cup with the Japanese women's national team	Won	
Asahi Sports Award	1981	Victory at the 1981 Uber Cup with the Japanese women's national team	Won	

== Achievements ==
=== World Cup ===
Women's doubles

Year	Venue	Partner	Opponent	Score	Result
1979	Tokyo, Japan	(Japan) Atsuko Tokuda	(Indonesia) Verawaty Fadjrin (Indonesia) Imelda Wiguna	6–15, 15–18	Bronze
1980	Kyoto, Japan	(Japan) Saori Kondo	(Indonesia) Verawaty Fadjrin (Indonesia) Imelda Wiguna	9–15, 15–11, 3–15	Bronze

=== International tournaments ===
Women's doubles

Year	Tournament	Partner	Opponent	Score	Result	Ref
1978	All England Open	(Japan) Atsuko Tokuda	(Japan) Emiko Ueno (Japan) Yoshiko Yonekura	18–16, 15–6	(gold) Winner	
1979	Denmark Open	(Japan) Atsuko Tokuda	(England) Anne Statt (England) Nora Perry	15–11, 15–9	(gold) Winner	
1979	All England Open	(Japan) Atsuko Tokuda	(Indonesia) Verawaty Fadjrin (Indonesia) Imelda Wiguna	3–15, 15–10, 5–15	(silver) Runner-up	

=== Invitational tournament ===
Women's doubles

Year	Tournament	Partner	Opponent	Score	Result
1977	Asian Invitational Championships	(Japan) Atsuko Tokuda	(China) Liang Qiuxia (China) Liu Xia	7–15, 6–15	Silver
