= Verawaty Fadjrin =

Indonesian badminton player (1957–2021)

Personal information
- Born: Verawaty Wiharjo; 1 October 1957 Jakarta, Indonesia
- Died: 21 November 2021 (aged 64) Jakarta, Indonesia
- Height: 1.78 m (5 ft 10 in)

Sport
- Country: Indonesia
- Sport: Badminton
- Handedness: Right

Women's singles and doubles
- Highest ranking: 1 (WD with Imelda Wiguna in 1979)
- BWF profile
Medal record
Women's badminton
Representing Indonesia
World Championships
Gold medal – first place	1980 Jakarta	Women's singles
Silver medal – second place	1980 Jakarta	Women's doubles
Silver medal – second place	1989 Jakarta	Mixed doubles
World Cup
Gold medal – first place	1986 Jakarta	Mixed doubles
Silver medal – second place	1979 Tokyo	Women's doubles
Silver medal – second place	1980 Kyoto	Women's doubles
Silver medal – second place	1982 Kuala Lumpur	Women's singles
Bronze medal – third place	1979 Tokyo	Women's singles
Bronze medal – third place	1986 Jakarta	Women's doubles
Bronze medal – third place	1987 Kuala Lumpur	Women's doubles
Bronze medal – third place	1988 Bangkok	Women's doubles
Bronze medal – third place	1989 Guangzhou	Women's doubles
Sudirman Cup
Gold medal – first place	1989 Jakarta	Mixed team
Uber Cup
Silver medal – second place	1978 Auckland	Women's team
Silver medal – second place	1981 Tokyo	Women's team
Silver medal – second place	1986 Jakarta	Women's team
Bronze medal – third place	1988 Kuala Lumpur	Women's team
Bronze medal – third place	1990 Nagoya–Tokyo	Women's team
Asian Games
Gold medal – first place	1978 Bangkok	Women's doubles
Silver medal – second place	1978 Bangkok	Women's team
Silver medal – second place	1990 Beijing	Mixed doubles
Silver medal – second place	1990 Beijing	Women's team
Bronze medal – third place	1986 Seoul	Women's team
Bronze medal – third place	1990 Beijing	Women's doubles
Asian Championships
Bronze medal – third place	1976 Hyderabad	Women's doubles
SEA Games
Gold medal – first place	1977 Kuala Lumpur	Women's team
Gold medal – first place	1979 Jakarta	Women's doubles
Gold medal – first place	1979 Jakarta	Women's team
Gold medal – first place	1981 Manila	Women's singles
Gold medal – first place	1981 Manila	Women's doubles
Gold medal – first place	1981 Manila	Women's team
Gold medal – first place	1985 Bangkok	Women's team
Gold medal – first place	1987 Jakarta	Women's doubles
Gold medal – first place	1987 Jakarta	Mixed doubles
Gold medal – first place	1987 Jakarta	Women's team
Gold medal – first place	1989 Kuala Lumpur	Mixed doubles
Gold medal – first place	1989 Kuala Lumpur	Women's team
Silver medal – second place	1977 Kuala Lumpur	Women's singles
Silver medal – second place	1979 Jakarta	Women's singles
Silver medal – second place	1985 Bangkok	Women's doubles
Silver medal – second place	1989 Kuala Lumpur	Women's doubles
Bronze medal – third place	1977 Kuala Lumpur	Women's doubles
- Political party: Gerindra
- Spouse: Fadjrin Biduin Aham (m. 1979)

Verawaty Fadjrin (née Wiharjo; 1 October 1957 – 21 November 2021) was an Indonesian badminton player who won international titles spanning from the late 1970s to the end of the 1980s. Tall and powerful, at one time or another she played each of the three variations of the sport (singles, doubles, and mixed doubles) at the highest world level.

== Career ==
During a relatively brief period as a regular singles competitor, Fadjrin won the 1980 IBF World Championships in Jakarta over fellow countrywoman Ivana Lie. She had been runner-up to Denmark's Lene Køppen at the All England Open Championships that year. She won the Southeast Asian Games title in 1981 and the Indonesia Open in 1982. Most of her early titles in women's doubles were in partnership with Imelda Wiguna. Together, they won the Asian Games (1978), the Danish Open (1979), the Canadian Open (1979), the All England (1979), and the Southeast Asian Games (1981). They were runners-up at the World Championships in 1980, and Fadjrin was runner-up at the 1982 All England with another fellow countrywoman Ruth Damayanti.

Following a hiatus in her international badminton career from 1983 to 1985, Fadjrin enjoyed impressive success in her late twenties and early thirties. She shared the women's doubles title at the Indonesia Open in 1986 and 1988, and finished second with Ivana Lie at the World Grand Prix Finals in 1986. Her greatest success late in her career, however, came in mixed doubles, which she had rarely played earlier. She won the 1986 and 1988 Malaysia Opens with Bobby Ertanto and Eddy Hartono respectively. In 1989, Fadjrin and Hartono won the World Grand Prix Finals, and the Dutch and Indonesia Opens together. They also reached the final round of the 1989 IBF World Championships in Jakarta, but could not overcome South Korea's Chung Myung-hee and the formidable Park Joo-bong.

Fadjrin led Indonesian Uber Cup (women's international) teams that finished second to Japan in 1978 and 1981, and to China in 1986. Of the seven matches won and the fourteen matches lost by Indonesia, collectively, in the final rounds of these three competitions, she was involved in six of the wins and only three of the losses. She also helped Indonesia win the Sudirman Cup (combined men's and women's team championship) over South Korea in 1989, her final year of international play.

== Achievements ==
=== World Championships ===
Women's singles
Year	Venue	Opponent	Score	Result
1980	Istora Senayan, Jakarta, Indonesia	(Indonesia) Ivana Lie	11–1, 11–3	Gold

Women's doubles
Year	Venue	Partner	Opponent	Score	Result
1980	Istora Senayan, Jakarta, Indonesia	(Indonesia) Imelda Wiguna	(England) Nora Perry (England) Jane Webster	12–15, 3–15	Silver

Mixed doubles
Year	Venue	Partner	Opponent	Score	Result
1989	Istora Senayan, Jakarta, Indonesia	(Indonesia) Eddy Hartono	(South Korea) Park Joo-bong (South Korea) Chung Myung-hee	9–15, 9–15	Silver

=== World Cup ===
Women's singles
Year	Venue	Opponent	Score	Result
1979	Tokyo, Japan	(Denmark) Lene Køppen	11–12, 11–3, 7–11	Bronze
1982	Stadium Negara, Kuala Lumpur, Malaysia	(Denmark) Lene Køppen	2–11, 10–12	Silver

Women's doubles
Year	Venue	Partner	Opponent	Score	Result
1979	Tokyo, Japan	(Indonesia) Imelda Wiguna	(Japan) Emiko Ueno (Japan) Yoshiko Yonekura	3–15, 7–15	Silver
1980	Kyoto, Japan	(Indonesia) Imelda Wiguna	(Japan) Atsuko Tokuda (Japan) Yoshiko Yonekura	12–15, 14–17	Silver
1986	Istora Senayan, Jakarta, Indonesia	(Indonesia) Ivanna Lie	(Indonesia) Rosiana Tendean (Indonesia) Imelda Wiguna	3–15, 14–15	Bronze
1987	Stadium Negara, Kuala Lumpur, Malaysia	(Indonesia) Rosiana Tendean	(China) Han Aiping (China) Li Lingwei	15–3, 10–15, 12–15	Bronze
1988	Indoor Stadium Huamark, Bangkok, Thailand	(Indonesia) Yanti Kusmiati	(South Korea) Chung So-young (South Korea) Kim Yun-ja	15–9, 8–15, 5–15	Bronze
1989	Guangzhou Gymnasium, Guangzhou, China	(Indonesia) Yanti Kusmiati	(South Korea) Chung So-young (South Korea) Hwang Hye-young	11–15, 6–15	Bronze

Mixed doubles
Year	Venue	Partner	Opponent	Score	Result
1986	Istora Senayan, Jakarta, Indonesia	(Indonesia) Eddy Hartono	(Denmark) Steen Fladberg (England) Gillian Clark	15–8, 17–15	Gold

=== Asian Games ===
Women's doubles
Year	Venue	Partner	Opponent	Score	Result
1978	Indoor Stadium Huamark, Bangkok, Thailand	(Indonesia) Imelda Wiguna	(China) Qiu Yufang (China) Zheng Huiming	17–14, 15–4	Gold
1990	Beijing Gymnasium, Beijing, China	(Indonesia) Lili Tampi	(China) Guan Weizhen (China) Nong Qunhua	8–15, 4–15	Bronze

Mixed doubles
Year	Venue	Partner	Opponent	Score	Result
1990	Beijing Gymnasium, Beijing, China	(Indonesia) Eddy Hartono	(South Korea) Park Joo-bong (South Korea) Chung Myung-hee	7–15, 15–7, 3–15	Silver

=== Asian Championships ===
Women's doubles
Year	Venue	Partner	Opponent	Score	Result
1976	Lal Bahadur Shastri Stadium, Hyderabad, India	(Indonesia) Holly Tanjung	(China) He Cuiling (China) Liang Qiuxia	1–15, 4–15	Bronze

=== SEA Games ===
Women's singles
Year	Venue	Opponent	Score	Result
1977	Selangor Badminton Association Hall, Kuala Lumpur, Malaysia	(Malaysia) Sylvia Ng	11–4, 4–11, 6–11	Silver
1979	Istora Senayan, Jakarta, Indonesia	(Indonesia) Ivanna Lie	8–11, 11–8, 9–12	Silver
1981	Camp Crame Gymnasium, Manila, Philippines	(Indonesia) Ivanna Lie	6–11, 11–4, 11–7	Gold

Women's doubles
Year	Venue	Partner	Opponent	Score	Result
1977	Selangor Badminton Association Hall, Kuala Lumpur, Malaysia	(Indonesia) Imelda Wiguna	(Thailand) Porntip Buntanon (Thailand) Thongkam Kingmanee		Bronze
1979	Istora Gelora Bung Karno, Jakarta, Indonesia	(Indonesia) Imelda Wiguna	(Indonesia) Ruth Damayanti (Indonesia) Theresia Widiastuti	15–4, 15–2	Gold
1981	Camp Crame Gymnasium, Manila, Philippines	(Indonesia) Ruth Damayanti	(Indonesia) Theresia Widiastuti (Indonesia) Imelda Wiguna	15–13, 15–4	Gold
1985	Chulalongkorn University Indoor Stadium, Bangkok, Thailand	(Indonesia) Elizabeth Latief	(Indonesia) Rosiana Tendean (Indonesia) Imelda Wiguna	2–15, 4–15	Silver
1987	Kuningan Hall, Jakarta, Indonesia	(Indonesia) Rosiana Tendean	(Indonesia) Yanti Kusmiati (Indonesia) Erma Sulistianingsih	17–14, 15–17, 15–10	Gold
1989	Stadium Negara, Kuala Lumpur, Malaysia	(Indonesia) Yanti Kusmiati	(Indonesia) Erma Sulistianingsih (Indonesia) Rosiana Tendean	6–15, 6–15	Silver

Mixed doubles
Year	Venue	Partner	Opponent	Score	Result
1987	Kuningan Hall, Jakarta, Indonesia	(Indonesia) Eddy Hartono	(Indonesia) Richard Mainaky (Indonesia) Yanti Kusmiati	15–9, 17–14	Gold
1989	Stadium Negara, Kuala Lumpur, Malaysia	(Indonesia) Eddy Hartono	(Indonesia) Aryono Miranat (Indonesia) Minarti Timur	16–17, 15–9, 15–2	Gold

=== International tournaments ===
The World Badminton Grand Prix was sanctioned by the International Badminton Federation from 1983 to 2006.

Women's singles
Year	Tournament	Opponent	Score	Result
1979	Canada Open	(Japan) Fumiko Tookairin	11–5, 7–11, 9–12	(silver) Runner-up
1980	All England Open	(Denmark) Lene Køppen	2–11, 6–11	(silver) Runner-up
1982	Indonesia Open	(Japan) Sumiko Kitada	11–8, 12–10	(gold) Winner

Women's doubles
Year	Tournament	Partner	Opponent	Score	Result
1978	Denmark Open	(Indonesia) Imelda Wiguna	(Japan) Emiko Ueno (Japan) Yoshiko Yonekura	15–8, 8–15, 15–4	(gold) Winner
1979	All England Open	(Indonesia) Imelda Wiguna	(Japan) Mikiko Takada (Japan) Atsuko Tokuda	15–3, 10–15, 15–5	(gold) Winner
1979	Canada Open	(Indonesia) Imelda Wiguna	(Japan) Mikiko Takada (Japan) Atsuko Tokuda	7–15, 15–12, 15–7	(gold) Winner
1982	Japan Open	(Indonesia) Ruth Damayanti	(England) Nora Perry (England) Jane Webster	15–3, 7–15, 12–15	(silver) Runner-up
1982	Chinese Taipei Open	(Indonesia) Ruth Damayanti	(England) Nora Perry (England) Jane Webster	8–15, 17–18	(silver) Runner-up
1982	All England Open	(Indonesia) Ruth Damayanti	(China) Lin Ying (China) Wu Dixi	8–15, 5–15	(silver) Runner-up
1985	Malaysia Open	(Indonesia) Dwi Elmiyati	(England) Gillian Clark (England) Gillian Gowers	10–15, 11–15	(silver) Runner-up
1986	Chinese Taipei Open	(Indonesia) Ivanna Lie	(Japan) Sumiko Kitada (Japan) Harumi Kohara	15–11, 15–8	(gold) Winner
1986	China Open	(Indonesia) Ivanna Lie	(South Korea) Kim Yun-ja (South Korea) Yoo Sang-hee	15–8, 15–10	(gold) Winner
1986	Malaysia Open	(Indonesia) Ivanna Lie	(China) Lin Ying (China) Wu Jianqiu	4–15, 8–15	(silver) Runner-up
1986	Indonesia Open	(Indonesia) Ivanna Lie	(Indonesia) Rosiana Tendean (Indonesia) Imelda Wiguna	17–15, 15–2	(gold) Winner
1986	World Grand Prix Finals	(Indonesia) Ivanna Lie	(South Korea) Chung Myung-hee (South Korea) Hwang Hye-young	10–15, 6–15	(silver) Runner-up
1987	Indonesia Open	(Indonesia) Susi Susanti	(Indonesia) Ivana Lie (Indonesia) Rosiana Tendean	4–15, 16–17	(silver) Runner-up
1988	Indonesia Open	(Indonesia) Yanti Kusmiati	(South Korea) Chung Myung-hee (South Korea) Hwang Hye-young	15–6, 6–15, 15–8	(gold) Winner
1989	Indonesia Open	(Indonesia) Yanti Kusmiati	(Indonesia) Erma Sulistianingsih (Indonesia) Rosiana Tendean	7–15, 9–15	(silver) Runner-up
1990	French Open	(Indonesia) Ivana Lie	(South Korea) Chung Myung-hee (South Korea) Hwang Hye-young	2–15, 1–15	(silver) Runner-up

Mixed doubles
Year	Tournament	Partner	Opponent	Score	Result
1979	Canada Open	(Indonesia) Ade Chandra	(Indonesia) Christian Hadinata (Indonesia) Imelda Wiguna	6–15, 1–15	(silver) Runner-up
1986	Malaysia Open	(Indonesia) Bobby Ertanto	(Denmark) Steen Fladberg (England) Gillian Gilks	15–7, 18–15	(gold) Winner
1988	Malaysia Open	(Indonesia) Eddy Hartono	(China) Wang Pengren (China) Shi Fangjing	15–9, 15–7	(gold) Winner
1988	Indonesia Open	(Indonesia) Bobby Ertanto	(Indonesia) Eddy Hartono (Indonesia) Erma Sulistianingsih	9–15, 11–15	(silver) Runner-up
1989	Dutch Open	(Indonesia) Eddy Hartono	(Indonesia) Rudy Gunawan (Indonesia) Rosiana Tendean	15–5, 15–5	(gold) Winner
1989	Indonesia Open	(Indonesia) Eddy Hartono	(Indonesia) Rudy Gunawan (Indonesia) Rosiana Tendean	15–7, 15–2	(gold) Winner
1989	World Grand Prix Finals	(Indonesia) Eddy Hartono	(Denmark) Thomas Lund (Denmark) Pernille Dupont	12–15, 15–7, 15–6	(gold) Winner

IBF Grand Prix tournament
IBF Grand Prix Finals tournament

=== Invitational tournaments ===
Women's singles
Year	Tournament	Opponent	Score	Result
1976	Asian Invitational Championships; Bangkok, Thailand	(China) Liang Qiuxia	11–8, 0–11, 5–11	Silver

Women's doubles
Year	Tournament	Partner	Opponent	Score	Result
1988	Asian Invitational Championships; Bandar Lampung, Indonesia	(Indonesia) Yanti Kusmiati	(South Korea) Chung Myung-hee (South Korea) Hwang Hye-young	18–16, 18–14	Gold

== Sources ==
- Smash - Verawaty Fadjrin
