= Marjan Ridder =

Dutch badminton player (born 1953)

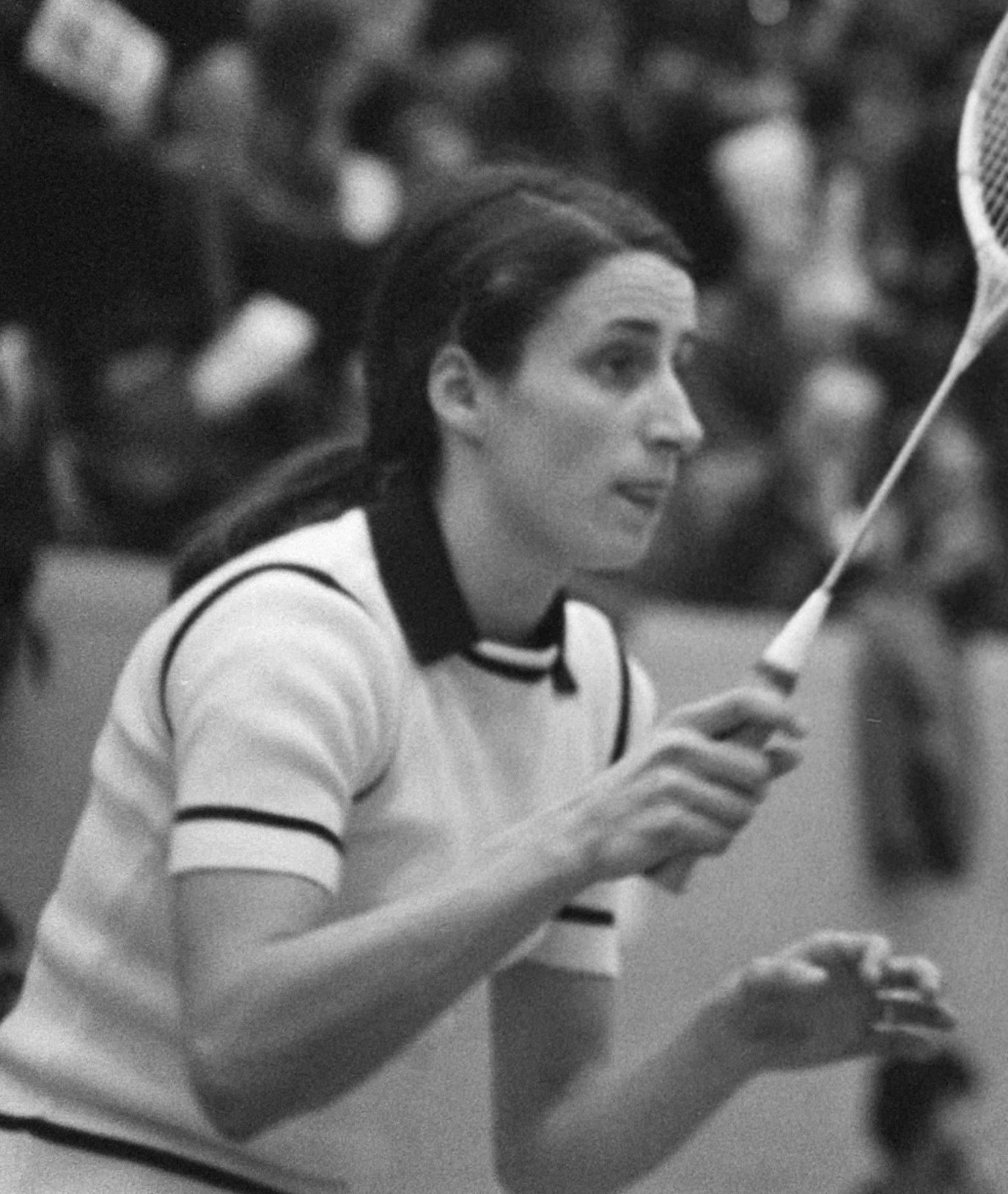
- Ridder in 1976

Personal information
- Born: 3 May 1953 (age 73) Haarlem, North Holland, Netherlands

Sport
- Country: Netherlands
- Sport: Badminton
Medal record
Women's badminton
Representing Netherlands
World Championships
| Silver medal – second place | 1977 Malmö | Women's doubles |
World Senior Championships
| Gold medal – first place | 2015 Helsingborg | Women's doubles 60+ |
| Gold medal – first place | 2015 Helsingborg | Mixed doubles 60+ |
| Gold medal – first place | 2021 Huelva | Women's doubles 65+ |
| Gold medal – first place | 2025 Pattaya | Women's doubles 70+ |
| Gold medal – first place | 2025 Pattaya | Mixed doubles 70+ |
| Silver medal – second place | 2021 Huelva | Mixed doubles 65+ |
European Championships
| Bronze medal – third place | 1974 Vienna | Women's doubles |
| Bronze medal – third place | 1976 Dublin | Mixed doubles |
| Bronze medal – third place | 1978 Preston | Women's doubles |
| Bronze medal – third place | 1978 Preston | Mixed doubles |
European Junior Championships
| Gold medal – first place | 1969 Voorburg | Girls' doubles |
| Silver medal – second place | 1971 Gottwaldov | Girls' singles |
| Bronze medal – third place | 1971 Gottwaldov | Girls' doubles |
| Bronze medal – third place | 1971 Gottwaldov | Mixed doubles |

Marjan Ridder (born 3 May 1953 as Marjan Luesken) is a Dutch badminton player.

== Career ==
Ridder won 17 Dutch titles. Internationally she was most successful in women's doubles, usually partnered with Joke van Beusekom, winning at the (first) European Youth Championships in 1969, the Denmark Open in 1972 and 1975, the Irish International in 1975, and the Dutch Open in 1977. She and Van Beusekom further earned bronze at the 1974, and 1978 European Championships, and silver at the (first) World Championships in 1977 in Malmö. With her partner Rob Ridder she won a bronze medal in the mixed doubles at the 1976 and 1978 European Badminton Championships

== Family ==
She is married to Rob Ridder, whose sister Marja Ridder, was also a highly successful player on 26 August 1976 in Haarlem. Marjan and Rob's son Koen Ridder also played badminton at the top level.

== Achievements ==
=== World Championships ===
Women's doubles
| Year | Venue | Partner | Opponent | Score | Result | Ref. |
|---|---|---|---|---|---|---|
| 1977 | Malmö Isstadion, Malmö, Sweden | (Netherlands) Joke van Beusekom | (Japan) Etsuko Toganoo (Japan) Emiko Ueno | 10–15, 11–15 | Silver | |

=== World Senior Championships ===
Women's doubles

| Year | Age | Venue | Partner | Opponent | Score | Result | Ref |
|---|---|---|---|---|---|---|---|
| 2015 | 60+ | Helsingborg Arena, Helsingborg, Sweden | (Scotland) Christine Black | (England) Marguerite Butt (England) Ann Hurst | 21–16, 21–8 | Gold | |
| 2021 | 65+ | Palacio de los Deportes Carolina Marín, Huelva, Spain | (Scotland) Christine Black | (England) Betty Barlett (England) Brenda Creasey | 21–18, 15–21, 21–16 | Gold | |
| 2025 | 70+ | Eastern National Sports Training Centre, Pattaya, Thailand | (Scotland) Christine Black | (England) Brenda Creasey (England) Janet B Williams | 18–21, 21–11, 21–17 | Gold | |

Mixed doubles

| Year | Age | Venue | Partner | Opponent | Score | Result | Ref |
|---|---|---|---|---|---|---|---|
| 2015 | 60+ | Helsingborg Arena, Helsingborg, Sweden | (Netherlands) Rob Ridder | (England) Graham Holt (England) Ann Hurst | | Gold | |
| 2021 | 65+ | Palacio de los Deportes Carolina Marín, Huelva, Spain | (Netherlands) Rob Ridder | (England) Peter Emptage (England) Betty Bartlett | 13–21, 21–19, 18–21 | Silver | |
| 2025 | 70+ | Eastern National Sports Training Centre, Pattaya, Thailand | (Netherlands) Rob Ridder | (England) Chris Hockey (England) Brenda Creasey | 21–14, 21–11 | Gold | |

=== International tournaments ===
Women's singles
| Year | Tournament | Opponent | Score | Result |
|---|---|---|---|---|
| 1975 | Scottish Open | (England) Nora Gardner | 11–6, 11–5 | (gold) Winner |
| 1977 | Scottish Open | (Scotland) Joy Reid | 11–5, 11–5 | (gold) Winner |
| 1980 | Belgian International | (Netherlands) Hanke de Kort | 11–6, 11–3 | (gold) Winner |

Women's doubles
| Year | Tournament | Partner | Opponent | Score | Result |
|---|---|---|---|---|---|
| 1974 | South African Championships | (Netherlands) Joke van Beusekom | (South Africa) J. Audibert (South Africa) Gussie Botes | | (gold) Winner |
| 1975 | Irish Open | (Netherlands) Joke van Beusekom | (Netherlands) Marja Ridder (Netherlands) Inge Rozemeijer | 15–9, 15–11 | (gold) Winner |
| 1976 | Belgian International | (South Africa) Gaylene Thatcher | (South Africa) Gussie Botes (South Africa) Marianne van der Walt | 18–14, 15–10 | (gold) Winner |
| 1980 | Belgian International | (Netherlands) Hanke de Kort | (Netherlands) Carol Liem (Netherlands) Gwennie van Beek | 15–7, 15–2 | (gold) Winner |
