= Atsuko Tokuda =

Japanese badminton player (born 1955)

Personal information
- Native name: 徳田 敦子
- Born: 15 September 1955 (age 71)

Sport
- Country: Japan
- Sport: Badminton

Women's doubles
- Highest ranking: 1 (1978)
Medal record
Women's badminton
Representing Japan
World Championships
Bronze medal – third place	1980 Jakarta	Women's doubles
World Cup
Gold medal – first place	1980 Kyoto	Women's doubles
Bronze medal – third place	1979 Tokyo	Women's doubles
Uber Cup
Gold medal – first place	1978 Auckland	Women's team
Gold medal – first place	1981 Tokyo	Women's team
Silver medal – second place	1975 Jakarta	Women's team
Asian Games
Silver medal – second place	1982 New Delhi	Women's team
Silver medal – second place	1986 Seoul	Women's team
Bronze medal – third place	1982 New Delhi	Women's doubles
Bronze medal – third place	1978 Bangkok	Women's team

Atsuko Tokuda (徳田 敦子, Tokuda Atsuko; born 15 September 1955) is a retired badminton player of Japan who won Japanese national and international titles in the late 1970s and the 1980s. Her international victories included the All-England women's doubles with Mikiko Takada in 1978 and the Danish Open women's doubles in 1978 and 1987 with Takada and Yoshiko Yonekura Tago respectively. Though most of Tokuda's international success came in doubles, she won the Japanese national singles title in 1978. She earned a bronze medal at the 1980 IBF World Championships in women's doubles with Yonekura. Tokuda helped Japan win world team titles in the Uber Cup competitions of 1978 and 1981 with a strong winning record in her individual matches. Tokuda and Takada were the first ever women's doubles world number ones in the first IBF world rankings released in 1978.

== Awards and nominations ==
Award	Year	Category	Result	Ref.
Asahi Sports Award	1978	Victory at the 1978 Uber Cup with the Japanese women's national team	Won	
Asahi Sports Award	1981	Victory at the 1981 Uber Cup with the Japanese women's national team	Won	

== Achievements ==
=== World Championships ===
Women's doubles
Year	Venue	Partner	Opponent	Score	Result
1980	Istora Senayan, Jakarta, Indonesia	(Japan) Yoshiko Yonekura	(England) Nora Perry (England) Jane Webster	12–15, 17–15, 6–15	Bronze

=== World Cup ===
Women's doubles
Year	Venue	Partner	Opponent	Score	Result
1979	Yoyogi National Stadium, Tokyo, Japan	(Japan) Mikiko Takada	(Indonesia) Verawaty Fadjrin (Indonesia) Imelda Wiguna	6–15, 15–18	Bronze
1980	Kyoto Prefectural Gymnasium, Kyoto, Japan	(Japan) Yoshiko Yonekura	(Indonesia) Verawaty Fadjrin (Indonesia) Imelda Wiguna	15–12, 17–14	Gold

=== Asian Games ===
Women's doubles
Year	Venue	Partner	Opponent	Score	Result
1982	Indraprastha Indoor Stadium, New Delhi, India	(Japan) Yoshiko Yonekura	(South Korea) Kim Yun-ja (South Korea) Yoo Sang-hee	12–15, 8–15	Bronze

=== IBF Grand Prix ===
The World Badminton Grand Prix sanctioned by International Badminton Federation (IBF) from 1983 to 2006.

Women's doubles
Year	Tournament	Partner	Opponent	Score	Result
1983	Scandinavian Cup	(Japan) Yoshiko Yonekura	(China) Chen Ruizhen (China) Zheng Jian	15–12, 15–8	(gold) Winner
1984	Denmark Open	(Japan) Yoshiko Yonekura	(South Korea) Kim Yun-ja (South Korea) Yoo Sang-hee	15–3, 5–15, 13–15	(silver) Runner-up
1984	Swedish Open	(Japan) Yoshiko Yonekura	(South Korea) Kim Yun-ja (South Korea) Yoo Sang-hee	11–15, 15–8, 9–15	(silver) Runner-up
1987	Denmark Open	(Japan) Yoshiko Yonekura	(England) Gillian Clark (England) Gillian Gowers	15–7, 15–10	(gold) Winner

=== International tournaments ===
Women's singles
Year	Tournament	Opponent	Score	Result
1978	Denmark Open	(Denmark) Lene Køppen	4–11, 11–9, 9–11	(silver) Runner-up
1981	Japan Open	(South Korea) Hwang Sun-ai	10–12, 12–10, 7–11	(silver) Runner-up

Women's doubles
Year	Tournament	Partner	Opponent	Score	Result	Ref.
1978	All England Open	(Japan) Mikiko Takada	(Japan) Emiko Ueno (Japan) Yoshiko Yonekura	18–16, 15–6	(gold) Winner	
1979	Denmark Open	(Japan) Mikiko Takada	(England) Anne Statt (England) Nora Perry	15–11, 15–9	(gold) Winner	
1979	All England Open	(Japan) Mikiko Takada	(Indonesia) Verawaty Fadjrin (Indonesia) Imelda Wiguna	3–15, 15–10, 5–15	(silver) Runner-up	
1979	English Masters	(Japan) Yoshiko Yonekura	(England) Nora Perry (England) Jane Webster	2–15, 15–8, 10–15	(silver) Runner-up	
1980	Denmark Open	(Japan) Yoshiko Yonekura	(England) Gillian Gilks (England) Nora Perry	15–18, 15–9, 9–15	(silver) Runner-up	
1980	Swedish Open	(Japan) Yoshiko Yonekura	(England) Karen Bridge (England) Barbara Sutton	15–8, 15–6	(gold) Winner	
1980	All England Open	(Japan) Yoshiko Yonekura	(England) Gillian Gilks (England) Nora Perry	15–11, 7–15, 6–15	(silver) Runner-up	
1980	English Masters	(Japan) Yoshiko Yonekura	(England) Nora Perry (England) Jane Webster	18–14, 6–15, 15–12	(gold) Winner	
1981	Denmark Open	(Japan) Yoshiko Yonekura	(England) Nora Perry (England) Jane Webster	12–15, 15–18	(silver) Runner-up	
1981	Japan Open	(Japan) Yoshiko Yonekura	(England) Nora Perry (England) Jane Webster	15–6, 7–15, 15–8	(gold) Winner	
1982	Indonesia Open	(Japan) Yoshiko Yonekura	(England) Gillian Clark (England) Gillian Gilks	14–17, 17–14, 12–15	(silver) Runner-up	
1982	Scandinavian Cup	(Japan) Yoshiko Yonekura	(England) Nora Perry (England) Jane Webster	15–11, 9–15, 4–15	(silver) Runner-up	

=== Invitational tournament ===
Women's doubles
Year	Tournament	Partner	Opponent	Score	Result
1977	Asian Invitational Championships	(Japan) Mikiko Takada	(China) Liang Qiuxia (China) Liu Xia	7–15, 6–15	Silver
