= Malmö Isstadion =

Indoor ice hockey rink in Malmö, Sweden

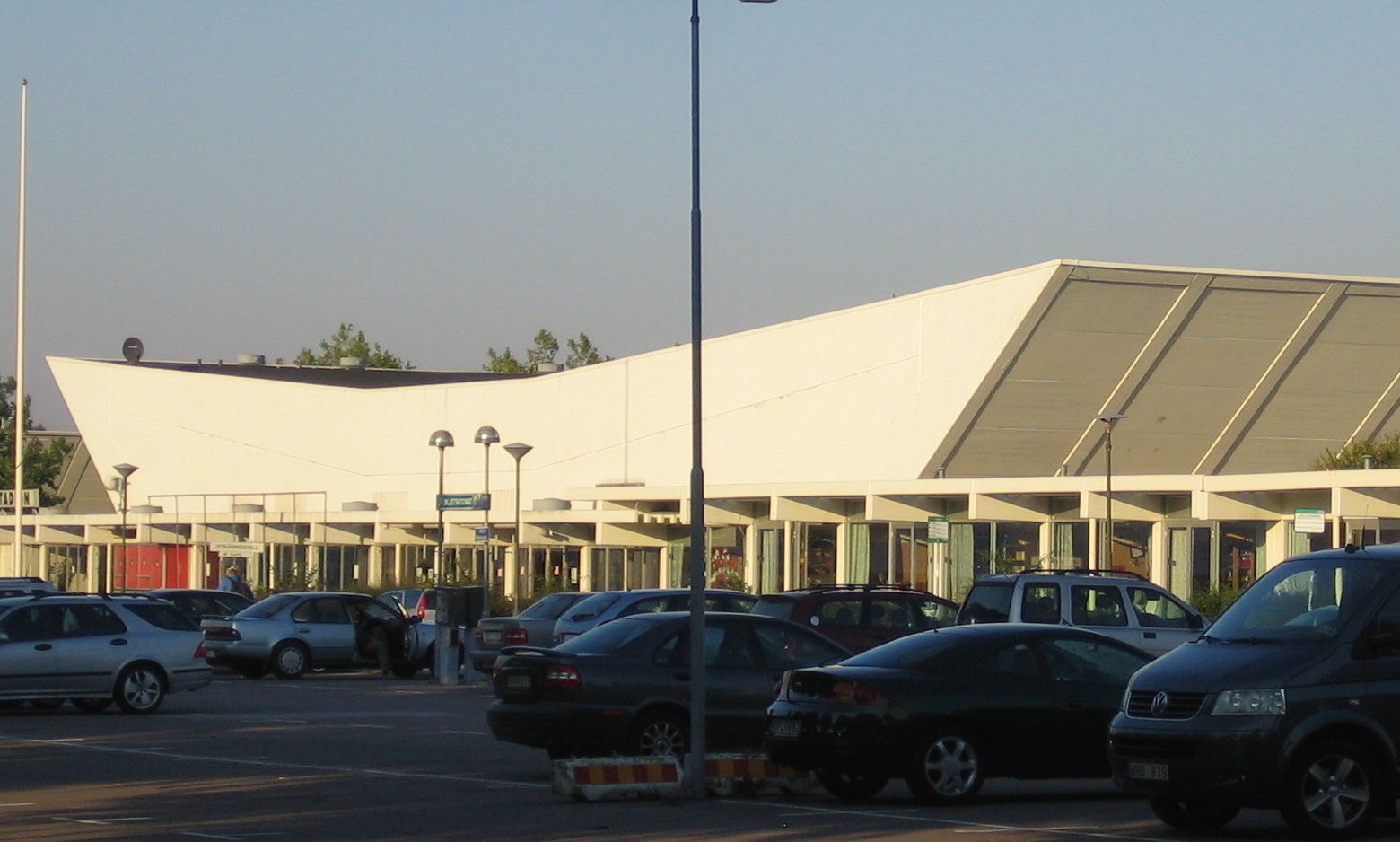
- Malmö Isstadion in September 2006
- Interactive map of Malmö Isstadion
- Location: Malmö, Sweden
- Coordinates: 55°34′57″N 12°59′29″E
- Owner: Stadsfastigheter
- Capacity: 5,800

Construction
- Opened: 1968
- Renovated: 2012–2013
- Architects: Sten Samuelson; Fritz Jaenecke

Tenants
- Malmö FF (1968–1972); Malmö Redhawks (1968–2008); IK Pantern (2015–2019)

Malmö Isstadion (Malmö Ice Stadium) is an indoor sports arena located in the Stadionområdet area of Malmö, Sweden. The capacity of the arena is 5,800 and it was built in 1968. It is the former home arena of the Malmö Redhawks ice hockey team, and was replaced as such by Malmö Arena, which was inaugurated in November 2008. In addition to sporting events, the arena was also used for concerts until the opening of the larger Malmö Arena.

== History ==
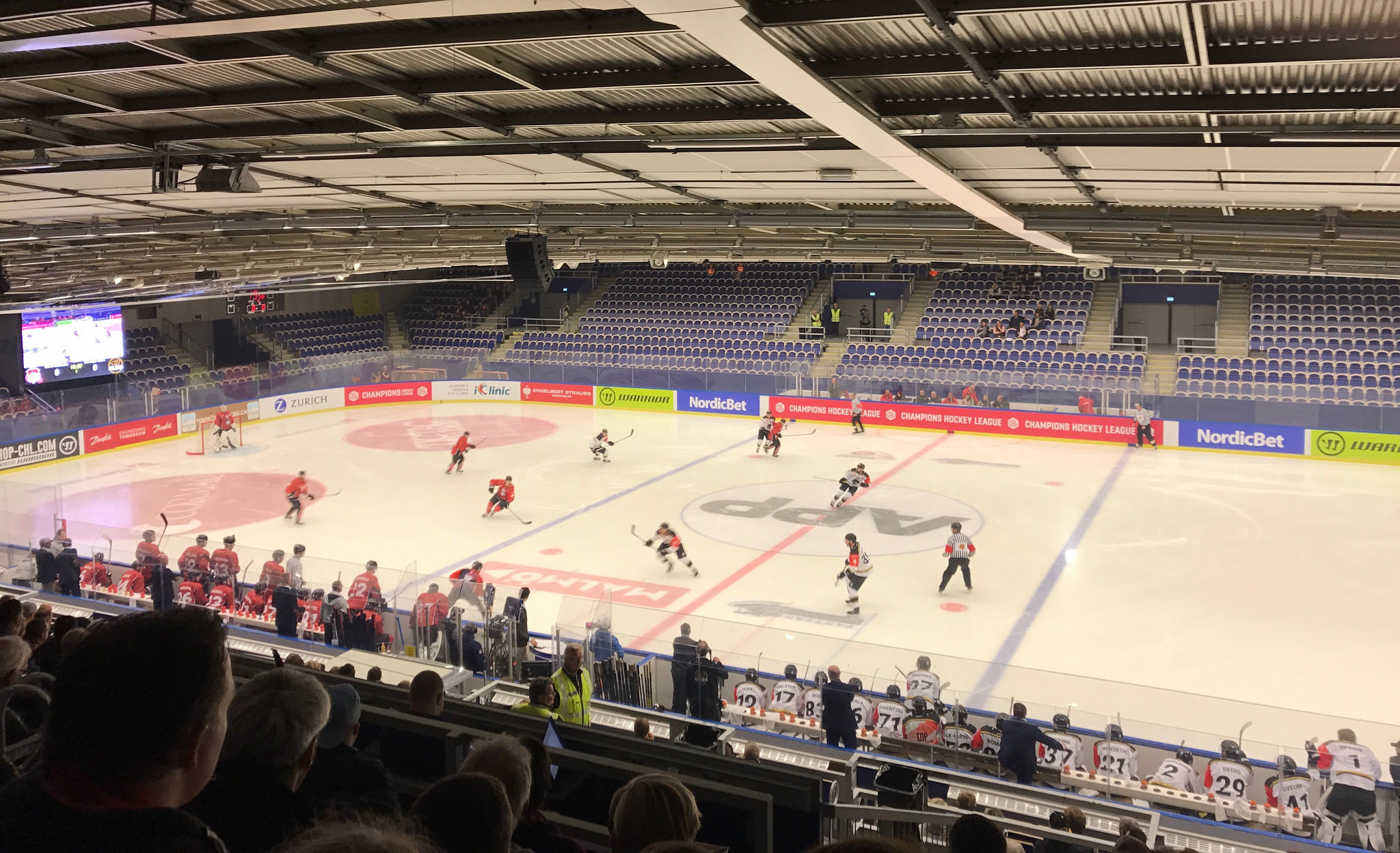
As venue of group match between Malmö and Stavanger, 31 August 2017

International events, such as the 1977 IBF World Championships, Eurovision Song Contest 1992 the 1996 Davis Cup final and the 2003 European Figure Skating Championships, have been held at Malmö Isstadion.

The arena underwent major renovation in time for the 2014 World Junior Ice Hockey Championships, which Malmö Isstadion hosted alongside Malmö Arena.

Following promotion to Hockeyallsvenskan, IK Pantern moved its home arena in Kirseberg to Malmö Isstadion from the 2015–2016 season.

The venue played host to the Group C matches of the 2016 European Women's Handball Championship.

== See also ==
- Malmö Arena
- List of indoor arenas in Sweden
- List of indoor arenas in Nordic countries

Events and tenants
Preceded by Olympic Stadium; Moscow	Davis Cup; Final Venue; 1996	Succeeded by Scandinavium; Gothenburg
Preceded by Cinecittà; Rome	Eurovision Song Contest; Venue; 1992	Succeeded by Green Glens Arena; Millstreet
Preceded by Scotiabank Place; Ottawa	IIHF Women's World Championship; Final Venue; 2015	Succeeded by Interior Savings Centre; Kamloops
