= Gold medalists at the BWF World Championships =

Badminton championships

This is a table of all gold medalists in the Badminton World Championships. Since 1983, the event has been held every two years, with it changing to an annual event since 2005 but taking a break during Olympic years.

== Results ==
Year	Men's singles	Women's singles	Men's doubles	Women's doubles	Mixed doubles
1977	(Denmark) Flemming Delfs	(Denmark) Lene Køppen	(Indonesia) Tjun Tjun (Indonesia) Johan Wahjudi	(Japan) Etsuko Toganoo (Japan) Emiko Ueno	(Denmark) Steen Skovgaard (Denmark) Lene Køppen
1980	(Indonesia) Rudy Hartono	(Indonesia) Verawaty Wiharjo	(Indonesia) Ade Chandra (Indonesia) Christian Hadinata	(England) Nora Perry (England) Jane Webster	(Indonesia) Christian Hadinata (Indonesia) Imelda Wiguna
1983	(Indonesia) Icuk Sugiarto	(China) Li Lingwei	(Denmark) Steen Fladberg (Denmark) Jesper Helledie	(China) Lin Ying (China) Wu Dixi	(Sweden) Thomas Kihlström (England) Nora Perry
1985	(China) Han Jian	(China) Han Aiping	(South Korea) Park Joo-bong (South Korea) Kim Moon-soo	(China) Han Aiping (China) Li Lingwei	(South Korea) Park Joo-bong (South Korea) Yoo Sang-hee
1987	(China) Yang Yang	(China) Han Aiping	(China) Li Yongbo (China) Tian Bingyi	(China) Lin Ying (China) Guan Weizhen	(China) Wang Pengren (China) Shi Fangjing
1989	(China) Yang Yang	(China) Li Lingwei	(China) Li Yongbo (China) Tian Bingyi	(China) Lin Ying (China) Guan Weizhen	(South Korea) Park Joo-bong (South Korea) Chung Myung-hee
1991	(China) Zhao Jianhua	(China) Tang Jiuhong	(South Korea) Park Joo-bong (South Korea) Kim Moon-soo	(China) Guan Weizhen (China) Nong Qunhua	(South Korea) Park Joo-bong (South Korea) Chung Myung-hee
1993	(Indonesia) Joko Suprianto	(Indonesia) Susi Susanti	(Indonesia) Ricky Subagja (Indonesia) Rudy Gunawan	(China) Nong Qunhua (China) Zhou Lei	(Denmark) Thomas Lund (Sweden) Catrine Bengtsson
1995	(Indonesia) Hariyanto Arbi	(China) Ye Zhaoying	(Indonesia) Rexy Mainaky (Indonesia) Ricky Subagja	(South Korea) Gil Young-ah (South Korea) Jang Hye-ock	(Denmark) Thomas Lund (Denmark) Marlene Thomsen
1997	(Denmark) Peter Rasmussen	(China) Ye Zhaoying	(Indonesia) Candra Wijaya (Indonesia) Sigit Budiarto	(China) Ge Fei (China) Gu Jun	(China) Liu Yong (China) Ge Fei
1999	(China) Sun Jun	(Denmark) Camilla Martin	(South Korea) Ha Tae-kwon (South Korea) Kim Dong-moon	(China) Ge Fei (China) Gu Jun	(South Korea) Kim Dong-moon (South Korea) Ra Kyung-min
2001	(Indonesia) Hendrawan	(China) Gong Ruina	(Indonesia) Halim Haryanto (Indonesia) Tony Gunawan	(China) Gao Ling (China) Huang Sui	(China) Zhang Jun (China) Gao Ling
2003	(China) Xia Xuanze	(China) Zhang Ning	(Denmark) Lars Paaske (Denmark) Jonas Rasmussen	(China) Gao Ling (China) Huang Sui	(South Korea) Kim Dong-moon (South Korea) Ra Kyung-min
2005	(Indonesia) Taufik Hidayat	(China) Xie Xingfang	(United States) Howard Bach (United States) Tony Gunawan	(China) Yang Wei (China) Zhang Jiewen	(Indonesia) Nova Widianto (Indonesia) Liliyana Natsir
2006	(China) Lin Dan	(China) Xie Xingfang	(China) Cai Yun (China) Fu Haifeng	(China) Gao Ling (China) Huang Sui	(England) Nathan Robertson (England) Gail Emms
2007	(China) Lin Dan	(China) Zhu Lin	(Indonesia) Markis Kido (Indonesia) Hendra Setiawan	(China) Zhang Jiewen (China) Yang Wei	(Indonesia) Nova Widianto (Indonesia) Liliyana Natsir
2009	(China) Lin Dan	(China) Lu Lan	(China) Cai Yun (China) Fu Haifeng	(China) Zhang Yawen (China) Zhao Tingting	(Denmark) Thomas Laybourn (Denmark) Kamilla Rytter Juhl
2010	(China) Chen Jin	(China) Wang Lin	(China) Cai Yun (China) Fu Haifeng	(China) Du Jing (China) Yu Yang	(China) Zheng Bo (China) Ma Jin
2011	(China) Lin Dan	(China) Wang Yihan	(China) Cai Yun (China) Fu Haifeng	(China) Wang Xiaoli (China) Yu Yang	(China) Zhang Nan (China) Zhao Yunlei
2013	(China) Lin Dan	(Thailand) Ratchanok Intanon	(Indonesia) Mohammad Ahsan (Indonesia) Hendra Setiawan	(China) Wang Xiaoli (China) Yu Yang	(Indonesia) Tontowi Ahmad (Indonesia) Liliyana Natsir
2014	(China) Chen Long	(Spain) Carolina Marín	(South Korea) Ko Sung-hyun (South Korea) Shin Baek-cheol	(China) Tian Qing (China) Zhao Yunlei	(China) Zhang Nan (China) Zhao Yunlei
2015	(China) Chen Long	(Spain) Carolina Marín	(Indonesia) Mohammad Ahsan (Indonesia) Hendra Setiawan	(China) Tian Qing (China) Zhao Yunlei	(China) Zhang Nan (China) Zhao Yunlei
2017	(Denmark) Viktor Axelsen	(Japan) Nozomi Okuhara	(China) Liu Cheng (China) Zhang Nan	(China) Chen Qingchen (China) Jia Yifan	(Indonesia) Tontowi Ahmad (Indonesia) Liliyana Natsir
2018	(Japan) Kento Momota	(Spain) Carolina Marín	(China) Li Junhui (China) Liu Yuchen	(Japan) Mayu Matsumoto (Japan) Wakana Nagahara	(China) Zheng Siwei (China) Huang Yaqiong
2019	(Japan) Kento Momota	(India) P. V. Sindhu	(Indonesia) Mohammad Ahsan (Indonesia) Hendra Setiawan	(Japan) Mayu Matsumoto (Japan) Wakana Nagahara	(China) Zheng Siwei (China) Huang Yaqiong
2021	(Singapore) Loh Kean Yew	(Japan) Akane Yamaguchi	(Japan) Takuro Hoki (Japan) Yugo Kobayashi	(China) Chen Qingchen (China) Jia Yifan	(Thailand) Dechapol Puavaranukroh (Thailand) Sapsiree Taerattanachai
2022	(Denmark) Viktor Axelsen	(Japan) Akane Yamaguchi	(Malaysia) Aaron Chia (Malaysia) Soh Wooi Yik	(China) Chen Qingchen (China) Jia Yifan	(China) Zheng Siwei (China) Huang Yaqiong
2023	(Thailand) Kunlavut Vitidsarn	(South Korea) An Se-young	(South Korea) Kang Min-hyuk (South Korea) Seo Seung-jae	(China) Chen Qingchen (China) Jia Yifan	(South Korea) Seo Seung-jae (South Korea) Chae Yu-jung
2025	(China) Shi Yuqi	(Japan) Akane Yamaguchi	(South Korea) Kim Won-ho (South Korea) Seo Seung-jae	(China) Liu Shengshu (China) Tan Ning	(Malaysia) Chen Tang Jie (Malaysia) Toh Ee Wei
2026	(France) Alex Lanier	(South Korea) An Se-young	(China) Liang Weikeng (China) Wang Chang	(South Korea) Baek Ha-na (South Korea) Lee So-hee	(France) Thom Gicquel (France) Delphine Delrue

== World Championships of the WBF ==
Year	Men's singles	Women's singles	Men's doubles	Women's doubles	Mixed doubles
1978	(China) Yu Yaodong	(China) Zhang Ailing	(China) Yu Yaodong (China) Hou Jiachang	(China) Zhang Ailing (China) Li Fang	(Thailand) Pichai Kongsirithavorn (Thailand) Petchroong Liengtrakulngam
1979	(China) Han Jian	(China) Han Aiping	(China) Sun Zhian (China) Yao Ximing	(Thailand) Sirisriro Patama (Thailand) Suleeporn Jittariyakul	(Hong Kong) Ng Chun Ching (Hong Kong) Chan Lim Chee
