= Badminton at the 1974 Asian Games – Men's team =

Men's team at the 1974 Asian Games
- Venue: Amjadieh Sports Complex, Iran
- Dates: 5 – 9 September 1974

Medalists
gold medal	China; Chen Tianxiang, Chen Xinhui, Fang Kaixiang, Hou Jiachang, Tang Xianhu, Yu Yaodong
silver medal	Indonesia; Ade Chandra, Christian Hadinata, Liem Swie King, Nunung Murdjianto, Tjun Tjun, Johan Wahjudi
bronze medal	India; Davinder Ahuja, Partho Ganguli, Raman Ghosh, Dinesh Khanna, Prakash Padukone

The badminton men's team tournament at the 1974 Asian Games took place from 5 to 9 September at the Amjadieh Sports Complex in Tehran, Iran.

== Schedule ==
All times are Iran Standard Time (UTC+03:30)

Date	Time	Event
Thursday, 5 September 1974	21:30	Round of 16
Friday, 6 September 1974	18:30; 21:00	Quarter-finals
Saturday, 7 September 1974	18:30	Semi-finals
Sunday, 8 September 1974	18:30	Bronze medal match
Monday, 9 September 1974	21:30	Gold medal match

== Bracket ==
Round of 16
Pakistan	3
North Korea	1
Japan	3
Thailand	2
Philippines	3
Nepal	2

Quarter-finals
China	3
Hong Kong	1
Pakistan	3
Japan	0
Indonesia	5
Iran	0
Philippines	0
India	3

Semi-finals
China	3
Pakistan	0
Indonesia	3
India	0

Gold medal match
China	3
Indonesia	2
Bronze medal match
Pakistan	0
India	3

== Round of 16 ==
=== Pakistan vs North Korea ===
Pakistan
3
Amjadieh Sport Complex
5 September 1974, 21:30

North Korea
1

			1	2	3
1	(Pakistan) (North Korea)	Hassan Shaheed; Joo Ryon-chang	15; 9	15; 9
2	(Pakistan) (North Korea)	Javed Iqbal; Kim Yong-do	15; 4	17; 3
3	(Pakistan) (North Korea)	Abdul Hamid / Tariq Wadood; Bak Ok-nyon / Kim Jong-guk	9; 15	13; 15
4	(Pakistan) (North Korea)	Javed Iqbal / Hassan Shaheed; Joo Ryon-chang / Kim Yong-do	15; 12	15; 4
5	(Pakistan) (North Korea)	Tariq Wadood; Bak Ok-nyon				not played

=== Thailand vs Japan ===
Thailand
2
Amjadieh Sport Complex
5 September 1974, 21:30

Japan
3

			1	2	3
1	(Thailand) (Japan)	Bandid Jaiyen; Yoshitaka Iino	13; 18	15; 10	15; 8
2	(Thailand) (Japan)	Sangob Rattanusorn; Masao Tsuchida	1; 15	4; 15
3	(Thailand) (Japan)	Pornchai Sakuntaniyom / Preecha Sopajaree; Nobutaka Ikeda / Shoichi Toganoo	15; 1	15; 7
4	(Thailand) (Japan)	Bandid Jaiyen / Sangob Rattanusorn; Yoshitaka Iino / Masao Tsuchida	11; 15	4; 15
5	(Thailand) (Japan)	Pornchai Sakuntaniyom; Shoichi Toganoo	3; 15	15; 5	12; 15

=== Philippines vs Nepal ===
Philippines
3
Amjadieh Sport Complex
5 September 1974, 21:30

Nepal
2

			1	2	3
1	(Philippines) (Nepal)	Daniel So; Kishor Bahadur Singha	13; 15	15; 5	12; 15
2	(Philippines) (Nepal)	Conrado Co; Prem Pandey	14; 17	8; 15
3	(Philippines) (Nepal)	Renato Navarro / Valentin Oreta; S. Lal Amaya / Uday Kumar Shrestha	15; 6	8; 15	15; 2
4	(Philippines) (Nepal)	Conrado Co / Daniel So; Prem Pandey / Kishor Bahadur Singha	15; 5	15; 10
5	(Philippines) (Nepal)	Valentin Oreta; J. Lal Amaya	15; 9	15; 9

== Quarter-finals ==
=== China vs Hong Kong ===
China
3
Amjadieh Sport Complex
6 September 1974, 18:30

Hong Kong
1

			1	2	3
1	(China) (Hong Kong)	Fang Kaixiang; Yan Po Tim	15; 6	15; 5
2	(China) (Hong Kong)	Hou Jiachang; Yang Mei Liang	15; 1	15; 1
3	(China) (Hong Kong)	Chen Xinhui / Yu Yaodong; Hauw Fan Chang / Wong Man Hing	10; 15	11; 15
4	(China) (Hong Kong)	Chen Tianxiang / Tang Xianhu; Cheng Kok Ming / Wong Cho Man	15; 5	15; 5
5	(China) (Hong Kong)	Yu Yaodong; Wong Man Hing				not played

=== Japan vs Pakistan ===
Japan
0
Amjadieh Sport Complex
6 September 1974, 21:00

Pakistan
3

			1	2	3
1	(Japan) (Pakistan)	Yoshitaka Iino; Hassan Shaheed	9; 15	12; 15
2	(Japan) (Pakistan)	Masao Tsuchida; Javed Iqbal	11; 15	11; 15
3	(Japan) (Pakistan)	Nobutaka Ikeda / Shoichi Toganoo; Javed Iqbal / Hassan Shaheed	6; 15	10; 15
4	(Japan) (Pakistan)	Yoshitaka Iino / Masao Tsuchida; Abdul Hamid / Tariq Wadood				not played
5	(Japan) (Pakistan)	Shoichi Toganoo; Tariq Wadood				not played

=== Indonesia vs Iran ===
Indonesia
5
Amjadieh Sport Complex
6 September 1974, 18:30

Iran
0

			1	2	3
1	(Indonesia) (Iran)	Liem Swie King; Sadra Shoushtari	15; 3	15; 1
2	(Indonesia) (Iran)	Nunung Murdjianto; Sirous Aflatoun	15; 3	15; 3
3	(Indonesia) (Iran)	Tjun Tjun / Johan Wahjudi; Mohsen Sheida / Sadra Shoushtari	15; 0	15; 1
4	(Indonesia) (Iran)	Ade Chandra / Christian Hadinata; Sirous Aflatoun / Dariush Foroughi	15; 2	15; 0
5	(Indonesia) (Iran)	Tjun Tjun; Dariush Foroughi	15; 0	15; 0

=== India vs Philippines ===
India
3
Amjadieh Sport Complex
6 September 1974, 21:00

Philippines
0

			1	2	3
1	(India) (Philippines)	Prakash Padukone; Daniel So	15; 5	15; 5
2	(India) (Philippines)	Dinesh Khanna; Renato Navarro	15; 6	15; 2
3	(India) (Philippines)	Raman Ghosh / Prakash Padukone; Conrado Co / Daniel So	15; 4	15; 9
4	(India) (Philippines)	Partho Ganguli / Dinesh Khanna; Renato Navarro / Valentin Oreta				not played
5	(India) (Philippines)	Davinder Ahuja; Daniel Buenaventura				not played

== Semi-finals ==
=== Indonesia vs India ===
Indonesia
3
Amjadieh Sport Complex
7 September 1974, 18:30

India
0

			1	2	3
1	(Indonesia) (India)	Liem Swie King; Dinesh Khanna	15; 12	15; 5
2	(Indonesia) (India)	Nunung Murdjianto; Prakash Padukone	15; 11	15; 9
3	(Indonesia) (India)	Tjun Tjun / Johan Wahjudi; Davinder Ahuja / Raman Ghosh	15; 2	15; 7
4	(Indonesia) (India)	Ade Chandra / Christian Hadinata; Partho Ganguli / Prakash Padukone				not played
5	(Indonesia) (India)	Tjun Tjun; Davinder Ahuja				not played

=== China vs Pakistan ===
China
3
Amjadieh Sport Complex
7 September 1974, 18:30

Pakistan
0

			1	2	3
1	(China) (Pakistan)	Tang Xianhu; Hassan Shaheed	15; 3	15; 4
2	(China) (Pakistan)	Fang Kaixiang; Javed Iqbal	15; 5	15; 11
3	(China) (Pakistan)	Hou Jiachang / Yu Yaodong; Javed Iqbal / Hassan Shaheed	15; 5	15; 9
4	(China) (Pakistan)	Fang Kaixiang / Tang Xianhu; Abdul Hamid / Tariq Wadood				not played
5	(China) (Pakistan)	Hou Jiachang; Tariq Wadood				not played

== Bronze medal match ==
=== India vs Pakistan ===
India
3
Amjadieh Sport Complex
8 September 1974, 18:30

Pakistan
0

			1	2	3
1	(India) (Pakistan)	Dinesh Khanna; Hassan Shaheed	18; 17	18; 14
2	(India) (Pakistan)	Prakash Padukone; Javed Iqbal	15; 12	16; 18	15; 11
3	(India) (Pakistan)	Partho Ganguli / Prakash Padukone; Abdul Hamid / Tariq Wadood	15; 5	18; 13
4	(India) (Pakistan)	Raman Ghosh / Dinesh Khanna; Javed Iqbal / Hassan Shaheed				not played
5	(India) (Pakistan)	Davinder Ahuja; Tariq Wadood				not played

== Gold medal match ==
=== Indonesia vs China ===
Indonesia
3
Amjadieh Sport Complex
9 December 1974, 18:30

China
0

			1	2	3
1	(Indonesia) (China)	Nunung Murdjianto; Hou Jiachang	3; 15	7; 15
2	(Indonesia) (China)	Liem Swie King; Tang Xianhu	4; 15	7; 15
3	(Indonesia) (China)	Tjun Tjun / Johan Wahjudi; Hou Jiachang / Yu Yaodong	12; 15	15; 13	15; 4
4	(Indonesia) (China)	Ade Chandra / Christian Hadinata; Chen Tianxiang / Tang Xianhu	17; 16	7; 15	17; 16
5	(Indonesia) (China)	Tjun Tjun; Fang Kaixiang	8; 15	17; 18

== Playoff tournament ==
=== 5th to 8th place ===
5th–8th place
Japan	3
Philippines	0
Hong Kong	3
Iran	0

5th place
Japan	3
Hong Kong	2
7th place
Philippines	3
Iran	0

=== 9th to 11th place ===
9th–11th place		9th place
Thailand	3
North Korea	1
North Korea	1	Thailand	3
		Nepal	0
