= Badminton at the 1978 Asian Games – Men's team =

Men's team at the 1978 Asian Games
- Venue: Indoor Stadium Huamark, Thailand
- Dates: 11 – 14 December 1978

Medalists
gold medal	Indonesia; Ade Chandra, Christian Hadinata, Rudy Heryanto, Kartono, Liem Swie King, Iie Sumirat
silver medal	China; Han Jian, Hou Jiachang, Lin Shiquan, Luan Jin, Tang Xianhu, Yu Yaodong
bronze medal	Thailand; Sawei Chanseorasmee, Bandid Jaiyen, Pichai Kongsirithavorn, Udom Luangpetcharaporn, Sarit Pisudchaikul, Surapong Suharitdamrong
bronze medal	Pakistan; Javed Iqbal, Zahid Maqbool, Hassan Shaheed, Tariq Wadood

The badminton men's team tournament at the 1978 Asian Games took place from 11 to 14 December at the Indoor Stadium Huamark in Bangkok, Thailand.

== Schedule ==
All times are Thailand Standard Time (UTC+07:00)

Date	Time	Event
Monday, 11 December 1978	10:30	Round of 16
Tuesday, 12 December 1978	10:30	Quarter-finals
Wednesday, 13 December 1978	10:00; 18:30	Semi-finals
Thursday, 14 December 1970	18:30	Gold medal match

== Bracket ==
Round of 16
Pakistan	3
Nepal	0

Quarter-finals
China	3
Hong Kong	0
Japan	2
Pakistan	3
Thailand	3
Malaysia	0
India	1
Indonesia	3

Semi-finals
China	3
Pakistan	0
Thailand	0
Indonesia	3

Gold medal match
China	2
Indonesia	3

== Round of 16 ==
=== Pakistan vs Nepal ===
Pakistan
3
Indoor Stadium Huamark
11 December 1978, 10:30

Nepal
0

			1	2	3
1	(Pakistan) (Nepal)	Tariq Wadood; Kishor Bahadur Singha	15; 2	15; 5
2	(Pakistan) (Nepal)	Hassan Shaheed; Prem Pandey	15; 8	15; 8
3	(Pakistan) (Nepal)	Javed Iqbal / Tariq Wadood; Pradeep Bikram Shah / Prakash Rana	15; 6	15; 9
4	(Pakistan) (Nepal)	Zahid Maqbool / Hassan Shaheed; Prem Pandey / Kishor Bahadur Singha				not played
5	(Pakistan) (Nepal)	Javed Iqbal; Pradeep Bikram Shah				not played

== Quarter-finals ==
=== Indonesia vs India ===
Indonesia
3
Indoor Stadium Huamark
12 December 1978, 10:30

India
1

			1	2	3
1	(Indonesia) (India)	Liem Swie King; Partho Ganguli	15; 7	15; 1
2	(Indonesia) (India)	Iie Sumirat; Prakash Padukone	9; 15	11; 15
3	(Indonesia) (India)	Ade Chandra / Christian Hadinata; Partho Ganguli / Uday Pawar	15; 4	15; 6
4	(Indonesia) (India)	Rudy Heryanto / Kartono; Leroy D'Sa / Prakash Padukone	18; 16	15; 6
5	(Indonesia) (India)	Christian Hadinata; Uday Pawar				not played

=== China vs Hong Kong ===
China
3
Indoor Stadium Huamark
12 December 1978, 10:30

Hong Kong
0

			1	2	3
1	(China) (Hong Kong)	Yu Yaodong; Leung Kai Fai	15; 6	15; 6
2	(China) (Hong Kong)	Luan Jin; Yang Mei Liang	15; 8	15; 5
3	(China) (Hong Kong)	Hou Jiachang / Yu Yaodong; Fu Han Ping / Wong Man Hing	15; 9	15; 9
4	(China) (Hong Kong)	Lin Shiquan / Tang Xianhu; Leung Kai Fai / Yang Mei Liang				not played
5	(China) (Hong Kong)	Han Jian; Wong Man Hing				not played

=== Thailand vs Malaysia ===
Thailand
3
Indoor Stadium Huamark
12 December 1978, 10:30

Malaysia
0

			1	2	3
1	(Thailand) (Malaysia)	Bandid Jaiyen; Sufian Abu Bakar	15; 5	15; 3
2	(Thailand) (Malaysia)	Udom Luangpetcharaporn; Phua Ah Hua	6; 15	15; 6	15; 12
3	(Thailand) (Malaysia)	Sarit Pisudchaikul / Sawei Chanseorasmee; Ho Khim Soon / Kwek Chiew Peng	15; 9	15; 11
4	(Thailand) (Malaysia)	Bandid Jaiyen / Surapong Suharitdamrong; Moo Foot Lian / James Selvaraj				not played
5	(Thailand) (Malaysia)	Pichai Kongsirithavorn; Moo Foot Lian				not played

=== Japan vs Pakistan ===
Japan
2
Indoor Stadium Huamark
12 December 1978, 10:30

Pakistan
3

			1	2	3
1	(Japan) (Pakistan)	Kinji Zeniya; Tariq Wadood	7; 15	7; 15
2	(Japan) (Pakistan)	Masao Tsuchida; Hassan Shaheed	15; 10	15; 7
3	(Japan) (Pakistan)	Nobutaka Ikeda / Kinji Zeniya; Javed Iqbal / Tariq Wadood	5; 15	8; 15
4	(Japan) (Pakistan)	Yoshitaka Iino / Masao Tsuchida; Zahid Maqbool / Hassan Shaheed	15; 7	15; 6
5	(Japan) (Pakistan)	Yoshitaka Iino; Javed Iqbal	17; 18	10; 15

== Semi-finals ==
=== China vs Pakistan ===
China
3
Indoor Stadium Huamark
13 December 1978, 10:00

Pakistan
0

			1	2	3
1	(China) (Pakistan)	Han Jian; Tariq Wadood	15; 3	15; 10
2	(China) (Pakistan)	Luan Jin; Hassan Shaheed	15; 6	15; 10
3	(China) (Pakistan)	Lin Shiquan / Tang Xianhu; Javed Iqbal / Tariq Wadood	8; 15	15; 13	17; 16
4	(China) (Pakistan)	Hou Jiachang / Yu Yaodong; Zahid Maqbool / Hassan Shaheed				not played
5	(China) (Pakistan)	Yu Yaodong; Javed Iqbal				not played

=== Indonesia vs Thailand ===
Indonesia
3
Indoor Stadium Huamark
13 December 1978, 18:30

Thailand
1

			1	2	3
1	(Indonesia) (Thailand)	Liem Swie King; Surapong Suharitdamrong	15; 2	15; 2
2	(Indonesia) (Thailand)	Iie Sumirat; Bandid Jaiyen	15; 11	10; 15	10; 15
3	(Indonesia) (Thailand)	Ade Chandra / Christian Hadinata; Bandid Jaiyen / Pichai Kongsirithavorn	15; 10	15; 10
4	(Indonesia) (Thailand)	Kartono / Liem Swie King; Sarit Pisudchaikul / Sawei Chanseorasmee	17; 18	15; 7	18; 16
5	(Indonesia) (Thailand)	Christian Hadinata; Pichai Kongsirithavorn				not played

== Gold medal match ==
=== China vs Indonesia ===
China
1
Indoor Stadium Huamark
14 December 1978, 18:30

Indonesia
3

			1	2	3
1	(China) (Indonesia)	Han Jian; Liem Swie King	6; 15	3; 15
2	(China) (Indonesia)	Luan Jin; Rudy Heryanto	10; 15	15; 6	9; 15
3	(China) (Indonesia)	Hou Jiachang / Yu Yaodong; Ade Chandra / Iie Sumirat	15; 9	15; 13
4	(China) (Indonesia)	Lin Shiquan / Tang Xianhu; Christian Hadinata / Liem Swie King	11; 15	8; 15
5	(China) (Indonesia)	Tang Xianhu; Iie Sumirat				not played
