= 1979 WBF World Championships – Women's team =

Badminton event

Women's team at the 1979 WBF World Championships
- Venue: Hangzhou Gymnasium
- Location: Hangzhou, China
- Dates: 10 – 15 June 1979

The women's team tournament at the 1979 WBF World Championships was held from 10 to 15 June 1979 at the Hangzhou Gymnasium in Hangzhou, China. Only 6 teams from Asia and Africa competed in the championships.

== Draw ==
The group stage consists of 2 groups, Group 1, Group 2. The first-placed teams in each group will advance to the final round while the rest will compete in the classification rounds.

Group 1	Group 2
China; Mauritius; Singapore	Burma; Hong Kong; Thailand

== Group stage ==
All times are China Standard Time (UTC+08:00).

=== Group 1 ===
Pos	Team	Pld	W	L	MF	MA	MD	Pts	Qualification
1	China	2	2	0	10	0	+10	2	Final
2	Singapore	2	1	1	5	5	0	1	Classification round
3	Mauritius	2	0	2	0	10	−10	0	Classification round

Source: NewspaperSG

Singapore
5
Hangzhou Gymnasium
10 June 1979

Mauritius
0

			1	2	3
1	(Singapore) (Mauritius)	Cindy Cheong; Cathy Ng Ah Yeh	11; 6	11; 1
2	(Singapore) (Mauritius)	Corine Chia; Geneviève Carosin	11; 6	11; 1
3	(Singapore) (Mauritius)	Cindy Cheong / Juliana Lee; Anne-Marie Bouchet / Rosida Dulloo	15; 5	15; 1
4	(Singapore) (Mauritius)	Juliana Lee; Rosida Dulloo	11; 1	11; 1
5	(Singapore) (Mauritius)	Leong Kay Sine / Tay Hoe See; Geneviève Carosin / Cathy Ng Ah Yeh	15; 5	15; 1

China
5
Hangzhou Gymnasium
11 June 1979

Mauritius
0

			1	2	3
1	(China) (Mauritius)	Fu Chun’e; Geneviève Carosin	11; 1	11; 3
2	(China) (Mauritius)	Xu Rong; Cathy Ng Ah Yeh	11; 2	11; 2
3	(China) (Mauritius)	Han Aiping / He Cuiling; Anne-Marie Bouchet / Rosida Dulloo	15; 2	15; 2
4	(China) (Mauritius)	Liu Xia / Zhang Ailing; Geneviève Carosin / Cathy Ng Ah Yeh	15; 2	15; 2
5	(China) (Mauritius)	Zhang Ailing; Rosida Dulloo	11; 1	11; 1

China
5
Hangzhou Gymnasium
12 June 1979

Singapore
0

			1	2	3
1	(China) (Singapore)	Han Aiping; Cindy Cheong	11; 6	11; 1
2	(China) (Singapore)	Liu Xia; Juliana Lee	11; 1	11; 1
3	(China) (Singapore)	Han Aiping / He Cuiling; Leong Kay Sine / Tay Hoe See	15; 9	15; 8
4	(China) (Singapore)	Xu Rong / Zhang Ailing; Cindy Cheong / Juliana Lee	15; 5	15; 1
5	(China) (Singapore)	Fu Chun’e; Tay Hoe See	11; 1	11; 3

=== Group 2 ===
Pos	Team	Pld	W	L	MF	MA	MD	Pts	Qualification
1	Thailand	2	2	0	8	2	+6	2	Final
2	Burma	2	1	1	5	5	0	1	Classification round
3	Hong Kong	2	0	2	2	8	−6	0	Classification round

Source: NewspaperSG

Thailand
5
Hangzhou Gymnasium
10 June 1979

Hong Kong
0

			1	2	3
1	(Thailand) (Hong Kong)	Sirisriro Patama; Amy Chan
2	(Thailand) (Hong Kong)	Thongkham Kingmanee; Amanda Li
3	(Thailand) (Hong Kong)	Jutatip Banjongsilp / Thongkham Kingmanee; Ho Tsui Wan / Leung Pik Leun
4	(Thailand) (Hong Kong)	Suleeporn Jittariyakul / Sirisriro Patama; Amy Chan / Amanda Li
5	(Thailand) (Hong Kong)	Suleeporn Jittariyakul; Leung Pik Leun

Hong Kong
2
Hangzhou Gymnasium
11 June 1979

Burma
3

			1	2	3
1	(Hong Kong) (Myanmar)	Amy Chan; Kyaw Kyaw	12; 9	11; 7
2	(Hong Kong) (Myanmar)	Amanda Li; Mya Lay Sein	2; 11	3; 11
3	(Hong Kong) (Myanmar)	Ho Tsui Wan / Leung Pik Leun; Khin Khin Aye / Mya Lay Sein	5; 15	2; 15
4	(Hong Kong) (Myanmar)	Amy Chan / Amanda Li; Kyaw Kyaw / Win Ngwe	8; 15	15; 3	15; 3
5	(Hong Kong) (Myanmar)	Leung Pik Leun; Khin Khin Aye	0; 11	5; 11

Thailand
3
Hangzhou Gymnasium
12 June 1979

Burma
2

			1	2	3
1	(Thailand) (Myanmar)	Phanwad Jinasuyanont; Mya Lay Sein
2	(Thailand) (Myanmar)	Thongkham Kingmanee; Kyaw Kyaw
3	(Thailand) (Myanmar)	Jutatip Banjongsilp / Thongkham Kingmanee; Khin Khin Aye / Mya Lay Sein
4	(Thailand) (Myanmar)	Suleeporn Jittariyakul / Sirisriro Patama; Kyaw Kyaw / Win Ngwe
5	(Thailand) (Myanmar)	Suleeporn Jittariyakul; Khin Khin Aye

== Classification round ==
=== Second-placed teams ===
Third place
Singapore	0
Burma	5

=== Third-placed teams ===
5th place
Hong Kong	5
Mauritius	0

== Final ==
=== China vs Thailand ===
China
5
Hangzhou Gymnasium
15 June 1979

Thailand
0

			1	2	3
1	(China) (Thailand)	Liu Xia; Sirisriro Patama	15; 5	15; 2
2	(China) (Thailand)	Han Aiping; Suleeporn Jittariyakul	15; 3	15; 2
3	(China) (Thailand)	Su Lang / Zhang Ailing; Jutatip Banjongsilp / Thongkham Kingmanee	15; 2	15; 3
4	(China) (Thailand)	Han Aiping / He Cuiling; Suleeporn Jittariyakul / Sirisriro Patama	15; 3	12; 15	15; 6
5	(China) (Thailand)	Fu Chun'e; Thongkham Kingmanee	11; 5	11; 5

== Final ranking ==
Pos	Team	Pld	W	L	Pts	MD	Final result
1st place, gold medalist(s)	China (H)	3	3	0	3	+15	Champions
2nd place, silver medalist(s)	Thailand	3	2	1	2	+1	Runners-up
3rd place, bronze medalist(s)	Burma	3	2	1	2	+5	Third place
4	Singapore	3	1	2	1	−5	Fourth place
5	Hong Kong	3	1	2	1	−1	Fifth place
6	Mauritius	3	0	3	0	−15	Sixth place
