= Badminton at GANEFO =

Badminton made its debut in GANEFO (Games of New Emerging Forces) in 1963 and was one of the main sports in the multi-sport event. The sport was contested for a second time in the 1966 GANEFO in Phnom Penh, Cambodia (1st Asian GANEFO) prior to the collapse of the GANEFO organization in the 1970s.

Since the Chinese national badminton team were not able to compete in international events in the 1960s due to not being affiliated with the International Badminton Federation, the Chinese team were only allowed to compete in GANEFO badminton events. The Games gave the Chinese team a platform to shine as Chinese players managed to reach the finals in every discipline.

== Venues ==
Yeat	Edition	City	Country
1963	I	Jakarta	Indonesia
1966	II	Phnom Penh	Cambodia

== Winners ==
Year	Men's singles	Women's singles	Men's doubles	Women's doubles	Mixed doubles	Men's team	Women's team
1963	(China) Tang Xianhu	(Indonesia) Minarni	(Indonesia) Tan King Gwan (Indonesia) Abdul Patah Unang	(Indonesia) Minarni (Indonesia) Retno Kustijah	Not held	Indonesia	China
1966	(China) Tang Xianhu	(China) Chen Yuniang	(China) Hou Jiachang (China) Tang Xianhu	(China) Liu Xiaozheng (China) Yang Taijuan	(China) Fang Kaixiang (China) Chen Yuniang	China	China
