= Badminton at the 1966 GANEFO =

- Venue: Sangkum Reastr Niyum University Ceremony Hall, Phnom Penh, Cambodia
- Dates: 27 November 1966 – 7 December 1966

Badminton was contested at the 1966 GANEFO from 27 November to 7 December 1966. The events were held at the Sangkum Reastr Niyum University Ceremony Hall in Phnom Penh, Cambodia. The events held were men's singles, women's singles, men's doubles, women's doubles as well as the men's and women's team competition. The Games also introduced mixed doubles to the competition.

With the absence of the Indonesian team, the Chinese team made a clean sweep in men's singles and won gold in all disciplines. Hosts Cambodia also made history as their players managed to win their first few medals in badminton at the international stage.

== Medalists ==
Event	Gold	Silver	Bronze
Men's singles	Tang Xianhu; China	Fang Kaixiang; China	Yan Cuncai; China
Women's singles	Chen Yuniang; China	Liu Xiaozheng; China	Lim Choo Eng; Singapore
Men's doubles	China; Hou Jiachang; Tang Xianhu	China; Zheng Qingjing; Yan Cuncai	Japan; Keizo Okazaki; Toshi Suzuki
Women's doubles	China; Liu Xiaozheng; Yang Taijuan	China; Chen Yuniang; Xie Xueying	Singapore; Lim Choo Eng; Aishah Attan
Mixed doubles	China; Fang Kaixiang; Chen Yuniang	China; Hou Jiachang; Xie Xueying	Cambodia; Smas Slayman; Thach Thi Sanh
Men's team	China; Fang Kaixiang; Hou Jiachang; Tang Xianhu; Yan Cuncai	Cambodia; Smas Slayman; Mak Kim San; Bé Sabin; A. D. Phatsatha	Singapore; Wee Choon Seng; Omar Ibrahim; Yeo Ah Seng; Ismail Ibrahim; Lindy Lin; Wee Sen
Women's team	China; Chen Yuniang; Liu Xiaozheng; Xie Xueying; Yang Taijuan	Cambodia; Kov Channa; Tieu Diem Linh; Thach Thi Sanh; Thi Do My Lanh	Singapore; Woo Ti Soo; Linda Chin; Aishah Attan; Lim Choo Eng; Amy Yap

== Medal table ==
* Host nation (Cambodia)

Rank	Nation	Gold	Silver	Bronze	Total
1	China (CHN)	7	5	1	13
2	Cambodia (CAM)*	0	2	1	3
3	Singapore (SIN)	0	0	4	4
4	Japan (JPN)	0	0	1	1
Totals (4 entries)		7	7	7	21

== Team results ==
=== Men's team ===
Quarter-finals
China	5
North Korea	0
Japan	2
Singapore	3
Pakistan	5
Ceylon	0
Nepal	0
Cambodia	5

Semi-finals
China	5
Singapore	0
Pakistan	2
Cambodia	3

Final
China	5
Cambodia	0
Third place
Singapore	5
Pakistan	0

==== 3rd place ====
Singapore
5
Sangkum Reastr Niyum University Ceremony Hall
1 December 1966

Pakistan
0

			1	2	3
1	(Singapore) (Pakistan)	Omar Ibrahim; Khawaja Salahuddin	15; 8	15; 5
2	(Singapore) (Pakistan)	Wee Choon Seng; Akram Baig	15; 1	15; 3
3	(Singapore) (Pakistan)	Ismail Ibrahim / Yeo Ah Seng; Tahir Karamat / Naqi Mohsin	18; 13	15; 5
4	(Singapore) (Pakistan)	Wee Choon Seng; Khawaja Salahuddin	15; 2	15; 6
5	(Singapore) (Pakistan)	Omar Ibrahim; Akram Baig	15; 4	15; 8

==== Final ====
China
5
Sangkum Reastr Niyum University Ceremony Hall
1 December 1966

Cambodia
0

			1	2	3
1	(China) (Cambodia)	Hou Jiachang; Smas Slayman	15; 2	15; 1
2	(China) (Cambodia)	Tang Xianhu; Mak Kim San	15; 2	15; 2
3	(China) (Cambodia)	Fang Kaixiang / Zheng Qingjing; Smas Slayman / Bé Sabin	15; 11	15; 3
4	(China) (Cambodia)	Hou Jiachang; Mak Kim San	15; 2	15; 4
5	(China) (Cambodia)	Tang Xianhu; Smas Slayman	15; 6	15; 1

=== Women's team ===
Quarter-finals
Singapore	4
Ceylon	1
Pakistan	5
Nepal	0

Semi-finals
China	5
Singapore	0
Pakistan	1
Cambodia	4

Final
China	5
Cambodia	0
Third place
Singapore	3
Pakistan	2

==== 3rd place ====
Singapore
3
Sangkum Reastr Niyum University Ceremony Hall
1 December 1966

Pakistan
2

			1	2	3
1	(Singapore) (Pakistan)	Lim Choo Eng; Elsie Hunt	11; 1	11; 2
2	(Singapore) (Pakistan)	Aishah Attan; Talat Sultana	11; 2	11; 4
3	(Singapore) (Pakistan)	Woo Ti Soo / Amy Yap; Elsie Hunt / Nighat Sultana	14; 17	9; 15
4	(Singapore) (Pakistan)	Lim Choo Eng; Talat Sultana	11; 3	11; 0
5	(Singapore) (Pakistan)	Linda Chin; Elsie Hunt	1; 11	3; 11

==== Final ====
China
5
Sangkum Reastr Niyum University Ceremony Hall
1 December 1966

Cambodia
0

			1	2	3
1	(China) (Cambodia)	Chen Yuniang; Thach Thi Sanh	11; 1	11; 1
2	(China) (Cambodia)	Xie Xueying; Kov Channa	11; 1	11; 1
3	(China) (Cambodia)	Liu Xiaozheng / Yang Taijuan; Thach Thi Sanh / Tieu Diem Linh	15; 4	15; 5
4	(China) (Cambodia)	Chen Yuniang; Kov Channa	11; 1	11; 1
5	(China) (Cambodia)	Xie Xueying; Thi Do My Lanh	11; 0	11; 1
