= Yao Ximing =

Chinese badminton player

Yao Ximing 姚喜明
Personal information
- Born: September 15, 1956 (age 70) Zhanjiang, Guangdong, China
- Years active: 1979-1985

Sport
- Country: China
- Sport: Badminton
- Handedness: Right
- Event: Men’s doubles
Medal record
Men's badminton
Representing China
World Games
Gold medal – first place	1981 Santa Clara	Men's doubles
World Championships
Gold medal – first place	1979 Hangzhou	Men's doubles
Gold medal – first place	1979 Hangzhou	Men's team
Thomas Cup
Gold medal – first place	1982 London	Men's doubles
Asian Games
Gold medal – first place	1982 New Delhi	Men's team
Asian Championships
Silver medal – second place	1976 Hyderabad	Men's doubles
Silver medal – second place	1976 Hyderabad	Men's team

Yao Ximing (Chinese: 姚喜明; pinyin: Yao Ximing; born September 15, 1956) is a former badminton player from China and current coach at the Vancouver Racquet Club in Vancouver, B.C., Canada.

== Career ==
A doubles specialist, Yao and partner Sun Zhian captured the men's doubles title at the 1979 World Championships in Hangzhou run by the short-lived World Badminton Federation, a China-led organization then in competition with the older International Badminton Federation. When the political complaints against the International Badminton Federation were resolved, Yao and Sun won men's doubles at the 1981 World Games in Santa Clara, California, the first major IBF sanctioned tournament in which China's players participated. In 1982 Yao and Sun helped China wrest the coveted Thomas Cup (men's world team trophy) from Indonesia, by defeating Indonesia's Kartono and Heryanto and thus gaining the critical fifth point in a best of nine match series. Yao and Sun participated in the 1983 IBF World Championships in Copenhagen but they were eliminated in the quarterfinals. Yao later migrated to the USA where he coached and played, winning the 1986 U.S. Open men's doubles with former Pakistani star Tariq Wadood. A few years later he moved to Canada where he became a coach at the Vancouver Racquet Club.

== Achievements ==
=== World Championships ===
Men's doubles
Year	Venue	Partner	Opponent	Score	Result
1979	Hangzhou; China	(China) Sun Zhian	(China) Luan Jin (China) Yu Yaodong	15–9, 15–3	Gold

=== World Games ===
Men's doubles
Year	Venue	Partner	Opponent	Score	Result
1981	San Jose Civic Auditorium, California, United States	(China) Sun Zhian	(Sweden) Stefan Karlsson (Sweden) Thomas Kihlström	12–15, 15–4, 15–6	Gold

=== Asian Championships ===
Men's doubles
Year	Venue	Partner	Opponent	Score	Result
1976	Lal Bahadur Shastri Stadium, Hyderabad; India	(China) Sun Zhian	(Indonesia) Ade Chandra (Indonesia) Tjun Tjun	Walkover	Silver

=== Invitational tournament ===
Men's doubles
Year	Tournament	Partner	Opponent	Score	Result
1977	Asian Invitational Championships	(China) Sun Zhian	(China) Hou Jiachang (China) Yu Yaodong	Walkover	Bronze
