= Nguyễn Anh Huy =

Cambodian-Vietnamese badminton player

Personal information
- Born: 1943 Vĩnh Long, Vietnam
- Died: 2006 (aged 62–63) Ho Chi Minh City, Vietnam

Sport
- Country: Cambodia (1958–1975); Vietnam (1975–1990)
- Sport: Badminton
Medal record
Men's badminton
Representing Cambodia
Southeast Asian Games
Silver medal – second place	1961 Rangoon	Men's singles
GANEFO
Silver medal – second place	1966 Phnom Penh	Men's team
Bronze medal – third place	1966 Phnom Penh	Mixed doubles

Nguyễn Anh Huy (1943–2006), formerly known as Smas Slayman (Khmer: សម៉ាស សឡៃម៉ាន), was a Cambodian-Vietnamese badminton player and coach. He was one of Cambodia's top badminton players in the 1960s. Originally from Vĩnh Long, he moved to Cambodia at a young age under the name Slayman.

== Career ==
Under the Cambodian national team, he won Cambodia's first international medal in badminton at the 1961 Southeast Asian Peninsular Games when he achieved silver in the men's singles event. In 1966, he competed in the 1966 GANEFO and was part of the Cambodian team that advanced to the finals of the men's team event. He also won a bronze medal in mixed doubles with Thach Thi Sanh.

In 1971, he competed in the 1971 Asian Badminton Championships in Jakarta. Paired with Thi Do My Lanh, they reached the semi-finals of the mixed doubles event but lost out to Indra Gunawan and Intan Nurtjahja 12–15, 5–15. In the bronze medal match, the duo finished fourth after losing to Tata Budiman and Poppy Tumengkol 8–15, 9–15.

== Coaching ==
After 1975, he and his family decided to return to their homeland and apply for Vietnamese citizenship under the name Nguyễn Anh Huy. He then became the coach of the District 1 Sports Department local badminton team. He was later appointed as the coach of the Ho Chi Minh City badminton team and nurtured a new generation of Vietnamese badminton players such as Nguyễn Quang Minh and Trần Thanh Hải.

== Personal life ==
He was the father of three daughters and one son. His only son, Nguyễn Anh Hoàng is also a badminton player who won the national championships in men's singles in 2000. His youngest daughter, Nguyễn Thị Thanh Tiên is a two time national champion in women's singles.

== Achievements ==
=== Southeast Asian Peninsular Games ===
Men's singles

Year	Venue	Opponent	Score	Result
1961	Aung San Indoor National Stadium, Rangoon, Myanmar	(Thailand) Channarong Ratanaseangsuang	1–15, 3–15	Silver

=== GANEFO ===
Mixed doubles

Year	Venue	Partner	Opponent	Score	Result
1966	Sangkum Reastr Niyum University Ceremony Hall, Phnom Penh, Cambodia	(Cambodia) Thach Thi Sanh			Bronze
