= 1978 WBF World Invitational Championships =

Badminton championships

1978 WBF World Invitational Badminton Championships
Tournament details
- Dates: 23 – 27 February
- Location: Hong Kong

The 1978 WBF World Invitational Badminton Championships sanctioned by former governing body World Badminton Federation (WBF) took place in the month of February in Hong Kong. This invitational tournament was held prior to the first official WBF World Championships which was held in Bangkok later in that year. The individual competitions were conducted. At the end of day, China won all the disciplines except Mixed doubles which was won by host Hong Kong.

== Medalists ==
Discipline	Gold	Silver	Bronze
Men's singles	(China) Chen Tianlong	(China) Yu Yaodong	(China) Yan Yujiang
Men's singles	(China) Chen Tianlong	(China) Yu Yaodong	(China) Zhao Xinhua
Women's singles	(China) Liang Qiuxia	(China) Xu Jung	(China) Li Fang
Women's singles	(China) Liang Qiuxia	(China) Xu Jung	(China) Xie Loping
Men's doubles	(China) Lin Shiquan (China) Tang Xianhu	(China) Hou Jiachang (China) Yu Yaodong	(Pakistan) Hassan Shaheed (Pakistan) Tariq Wadood
Men's doubles	(China) Lin Shiquan (China) Tang Xianhu	(China) Hou Jiachang (China) Yu Yaodong	(Singapore) Kok Peng Hon (Singapore) Tan Eng Han
Women's doubles	(China) Li Fang (China) Liang Qiuxia	(China) Han Aiping (China) Xu Jung	(China) Kao Huilan (China) Xie Loping
Women's doubles	(China) Li Fang (China) Liang Qiuxia	(China) Han Aiping (China) Xu Jung	(China) Li Kumwah (China) Lo Waitun
Mixed doubles	(Hong Kong) Fu Hon Ping (Hong Kong) Amy Chan	(China) Chen Tianlong (China) Kao Huilan	(Zambia) J. Tikersa (Zambia) Christine Nyahoda
Mixed doubles	(Hong Kong) Fu Hon Ping (Hong Kong) Amy Chan	(China) Chen Tianlong (China) Kao Huilan	(Singapore) Tan Eng Han (Singapore) Leong Kaye Sine

== Semifinal results ==
Discipline	Winner	Runner-up	Score
Men's singles	(China) Yu Yaodong	(China) Zhao Xinhua	15–13, 15–3
Men's singles	(China) Chen Tianlong	(China) Yan Yujiang	15–11 retired
Women's singles	(China) Liang Qiuxia	(China) Li Fang	11–6, 11–6
Women's singles	(China) Xu Jung	(China) Xie Loping	11–2, 11–2
Men's doubles	(China) Hou Jiachang (China) Yu Yaodong	(Pakistan) Hassan Shaheed (Pakistan) Tariq Wadood	15–6, 15–4
Men's doubles	(China) Lin Shiquan (China) Tang Xianhu	(Singapore) Kok Peng Hon (Singapore) Tan Eng Han	15–6, 15–7
Women's doubles	(China) Li Fang (China) Liang Qiuxia	(China) Lo Waitun (China) Li Kumwah	15–3, 15–5
Women's doubles	(China) Han Aiping (China) Xu Jung	(China) Kao Huilan (China) Xie Loping	17–14, 15–6
Mixed doubles	(China) Chen Tianlong (China) Kao Huilan	(Zambia) J. Tikersa (Zambia) Christine Nyahoda	Walkover
Mixed doubles	(Hong Kong) Fu Hon Ping (Hong Kong) Amy Chan	(Singapore) Tan Eng Han (Singapore) Leong Kaye Sine	15–10, 15–12

== Final results ==
Discipline	Winner	Finalist	Score
Men's singles	(China) Chen Tianlong	(China) Yu Yaodong	18–13, 15–8
Women's singles	(China) Liang Qiuxia	(China) Xu Jung	10–12, 11–8, 11–2
Men's doubles	(China) Lin Shiquan (China) Tang Xianhu	(China) Hou Jiachang (China) Yu Yaodong	15–7, 15–1
Women's doubles	(China) Li Fang (China) Liang Qiuxia	(China) Han Aiping (China) Xu Jung	15–5, 15–7
Mixed doubles	(Hong Kong) Fu Hon Ping (Hong Kong) Amy Chan	(China) Chen Tianlong (China) Kao Huilan	18–15, 15–11
