= Sun Zhian =

Chinese badminton player and coach

Sun Zhian 孙志安
Personal information
- Born: 1956 (age 69–70) Suzhou, Jiangsu, China
- Years active: 1971–1986

Sport
- Country: China
- Sport: Badminton
- Handedness: Right
- Event: Men's doubles
Medal record
Men's badminton
Representing China
World Games
Gold medal – first place	1981 Santa Clara	Men's doubles
World Championships
Gold medal – first place	1979 Hangzhou	Men's doubles
Gold medal – first place	1979 Hangzhou	Men's team
Thomas Cup
Gold medal – first place	1982 London	Men's team
Silver medal – second place	1984 Kuala Lumpur	Men's team
Asian Games
Gold medal – first place	1982 New Delhi	Men's team
Asian Championships
Gold medal – first place	1983 Calcutta	Men's team
Silver medal – second place	1976 Hyderabad	Men's doubles
Silver medal – second place	1976 Hyderabad	Men's team
Bronze medal – third place	1983 Calcutta	Men's doubles
Bronze medal – third place	1976 Hyderabad	Mixed doubles

Sun Zhian (Chinese: 孙志安; pinyin: Sūn Zhì'ān; born 1956) is a Chinese former badminton player and coach. He is the gold medalist in World Games in 1981 and a former World Champion.

== Early life and career ==
Sun Zhian was born in 1956 in Suzhou, Jiangsu province. In 1970, 14-year-old Sun Zhian entered the junior high school of No. 32 Middle School in Suzhou. One day, Zhang Weidao, a physical education teacher, approached him and informed him that he was selected to go to Nanjing for a training camp. If he was qualified, he was expected to become a member of the Jiangsu badminton team. Sun started playing badminton at the age of 14 with no former training.

In 1971, 14-year-old Sun Zhian became the youngest member of the first batch of players in the Jiangsu provincial badminton team after three months of intensive training and selection. Sun used to train for 8 hours in a day. After the 1975 National Games, he was selected for the national training team. In 1978, he officially became a member of the Chinese national badminton team. With this, he also became the first badminton player from Jiangsu to be selected for the national team.

Sun Zhian partnered with Yao Ximing and won the 1979 WBF World Championships held in Hangzhou. With this, they retained the title for China in men's doubles category of the World Championships. He also won the fourth national games held in Beijing in September the same year, partnering Zhao Xinhua. He was felicitated by Vice Premier Deng Xiaoping after the match due to his World Championship victory in Hangzhou earlier in the year.

Sun then won the 1981 World Games held in Santa Clara, United States with partner Yao Ximing. They defeated two strong Indonesian pairs in quarterfinals and semi-finals. In the final they beat the Swedish pair to win the gold medal. He was the part of Chinese at the 1982 Thomas Cup held in London, United Kingdom. With his long time partner Yao Ximing, he played two matches in the final clash against the defending champions Indonesia. They won one match which proved instrumental in Chinese victory and hence claiming the Thomas Cup for the very first time which according to Sun Zhian himself was the most memorable moment of his entire career. He was also the member of Chinese team which won silver in the 1984 Thomas Cup campaign.

== Retirement and Coaching career ==
Sun retired in 1986 and officially became a coach in Jiangsu badminton team and went on to become the Head coach in 1992. As a coach he trained a group of outstanding players who went on to become World and Olympic champions, such as Sun Jun, Liu Yong, Ge Fei, Gu Jun, Cai Yun and Zhang Jun. He is also credited with 4 consecutive men's team championship titles for Jiangsu badminton team in the National Games of China. Sun Zhian officially retired as a coach in 2016.

== Achievements ==
=== World Championships ===
Men's doubles
Year	Venue	Partner	Opponent	Score	Result
1979	Hangzhou; China	(China) Yao Ximing	(China) Luan Jin (China) Yu Yaodong	15–9, 15–3	Gold

=== World Games ===
Men's doubles
Year	Venue	Partner	Opponent	Score	Result
1981	San Jose Civic Auditorium, California, United States	(China) Yao Ximing	(Sweden) Stefan Karlsson (Sweden) Thomas Kihlström	12–15, 15–4, 15–6	Gold

=== Asian Championships ===
Men's doubles
Year	Venue	Partner	Opponent	Score	Result
1976	Lal Bahadur Shastri Stadium, Hyderabad; India	(China) Yao Ximing	(Indonesia) Ade Chandra (Indonesia) Tjun Tjun	Walkover	Silver
1983	Netaji Indoor Stadium, Calcutta, India	(China) Zhao Jianhua	(South Korea) Sung Han-kook (South Korea) Yoo Byung-hwan	10–15, 6–15	Bronze

Mixed doubles
Year	Venue	Partner	Opponent	Score	Result
1976	Lal Bahadur Shastri Stadium, Hyderabad; India	(China) Li Fang	(Japan) Shoichi Toganoo (Japan) Etsuko Toganoo	11–15, 12–6 retired	Bronze

=== Invitational tournament ===
Men's doubles
Year	Tournament	Partner	Opponent	Score	Result
1977	Asian Invitational Championships	(China) Yao Ximing	(China) Hou Jiachang (China) Yu Yaodong	Walkover	Bronze
