= 1978 WBF World Championships =

Tournament details
- Dates: 4 to 7 November
- Edition: 1
- Location: Bangkok, Thailand

The 1978 WBF World Championships took place in November 1978 in Bangkok, Thailand. This event was followed by Invitational Championships which took place in the month of February earlier this year in Hong Kong. It was the first of the two editions of the world championships organised by the WBF, which was a rival organisation of the Badminton World Federation.

== Participating nations ==
- Bangladesh
- Brunei
- Burma
- China
- Hong Kong
- Iran
- Kenya
- South Korea
- Nepal
- Nigeria
- North Korea
- Pakistan
- Philippines
- Singapore
- Sri Lanka
- Tanzania
- Thailand

== Medalists ==
Event	Gold	Silver	Bronze
Men's singles	(China) Yu Yaodong	(China) Han Jian	(Thailand) Udom Luangpetcharaporn
Men's singles	(China) Yu Yaodong	(China) Han Jian	(China) Luan Jin
Women's singles	(China) Zhang Ailing	(Thailand) Sirisriro Patama	(China) Li Fang
Women's singles	(China) Zhang Ailing	(Thailand) Sirisriro Patama	(South Korea) Song Hyan-soon
Men's doubles	(China) Yu Yaodong (China) Hou Jiachang	(Thailand) Sarit Pisudchaikul (Thailand) Sawei Chanseorasmee	(Pakistan) Javed Iqbal (Pakistan) Tariq Wadood
Men's doubles	(China) Yu Yaodong (China) Hou Jiachang	(Thailand) Sarit Pisudchaikul (Thailand) Sawei Chanseorasmee	(Thailand) Pichai Kongsirithavorn (Thailand) Preecha Sopajaree
Women's doubles	(China) Li Fang (China) Zhang Ailing	(China) Zheng Huiming (China) Qiu Yufang	(Thailand) Sirisriro Patama (Thailand) Suleeporn Jittariyakul
Women's doubles	(China) Li Fang (China) Zhang Ailing	(China) Zheng Huiming (China) Qiu Yufang	(South Korea) Oh Yeon-han (South Korea) Song Hyan-soon
Mixed doubles	(Thailand) Pichai Kongsirithavorn (Thailand) Petchroong Liengtrakulngam	(Thailand) Preecha Sopajaree (Thailand) Porntip Buntanon	(China) Han Jian (China) Qiu Yufang
Mixed doubles	(Thailand) Pichai Kongsirithavorn (Thailand) Petchroong Liengtrakulngam	(Thailand) Preecha Sopajaree (Thailand) Porntip Buntanon	(Hong Kong) Fu Hon Ping (Hong Kong) Lee Kam Wah

== Results ==
=== Semifinals ===
Discipline	Winner	Runner-up	Score
Men's singles	(China) Yu Yaodong	(Thailand) Udom Luangpetcharaporn	15–4, 15–5
Men's singles	(China) Han Jian	(China) Luan Jin	
Women's singles	(Thailand) Sirisriro Patama	(South Korea) Song Hyan-soon	11–6, 5–11, 11–4
Women's singles	(China) Zhang Ailing	(China) Li Fang	11–6, 11–8
Men's doubles	(China) Hou Jiachang & Yu Yaodong	(Pakistan) Javed Iqbal & Tariq Wadood	7–15, 15–8, 15–1
Men's doubles	(Thailand) Sawei Chanseorasmee & Sarit Pisudchaikul	(Thailand) Pichai Kongsirithavorn & Preecha Sopajaree	15–3, 17–15
Women's doubles	(China) Li Fang & Zhang Ailing	(Thailand) Sirisriro Patama & Suleeporn Jittariyakul	15–8, 15–9
Women's doubles	(China) Zheng Huiming & Qiu Yufang	(South Korea) Oh Yeon-han & Song Hyan-soon	15–9, 15–5
Mixed doubles	(Thailand) Pichai Kongsirithavorn & Petchroong Liengtrakulngam	(China) Han Jian & Qiu Yufang	15–4, 15–6
Mixed doubles	(Thailand) Preecha Sopajaree & Porntip Buntanon	(Hong Kong) Fu Hon Ping & Lee Kam Wah	15–9, 11–15, 15–7

=== Finals ===
Category	Winners	Runners-up	Score
Men's singles	(China) Yu Yaodong	(China) Han Jian	15–11, 15–11
Women's singles	(China) Zhang Ailing	(Thailand) Sirisriro Patama	11–4, 11–4
Men's doubles	(China) Yu Yaodong (China) Hou Jiachang	(Thailand) Sarit Pisudchaikul (Thailand) Sawei Chanseorasmee	18–15, 15–12
Women's doubles	(China) Li Fang (China) Zhang Ailing	(China) Zheng Huiming (China) Qiu Yufang	5–15, 15–9, 15–10
Mixed doubles	(Thailand) Pichai Kongsirithavorn (Thailand) Petchroong Liengtrakulngam	(Thailand) Preecha Sopajaree (Thailand) Porntip Buntanon	15–4, 1–15, 17–14
