= Luan Jin =

Chinese badminton player

Luan Jin 栾劲
Personal information
- Born: 20 July 1958 (age 68) Xiamen, Fujian, China

Sport
- Country: China
- Sport: Badminton
- Handedness: Right
- Event: Men's singles
Medal record
Men's badminton
Representing China
World Championships
Gold medal – first place	1979 Hangzhou	Men's team
Silver medal – second place	1979 Hangzhou	Men's doubles
Bronze medal – third place	1978 Bangkok	Men's singles
Bronze medal – third place	1979 Hangzhou	Men's singles
Thomas Cup
Gold medal – first place	1982 London	Men's team
Silver medal – second place	1984 Kuala Lumpur	Men's team
Asian Games
Gold medal – first place	1982 New Delhi	Men's team
Silver medal – second place	1982 New Delhi	Men's doubles
Silver medal – second place	1978 Bangkok	Men's team
Bronze medal – third place	1978 Bangkok	Men's Singles
Asian Championships
Silver medal – second place	1976 Hyderabad	Men's team
Bronze medal – third place	1976 Hyderabad	Men's singles

Luan Jin (Chinese: 栾劲; born 1958) is a retired male badminton player from China who rated among the world's best singles players in the early to mid-1980s after China gained entry into the International Badminton Federation (now Badminton World Federation).

== Career ==
Luan won the All England Open Badminton Championships in men's singles in 1983, reversing a loss to Morten Frost in the 1982 final. He was a key member of China's Thomas Cup (men's international) teams of 1982 and 1984, the first of which narrowly won and the second of which narrowly lost the World Team title to arch-rival Indonesia. In these final round Thomas Cup show-downs Luan defeated Rudy Hartono and Liem Swie King.

== Achievements ==
=== World Championships ===
Men's singles
Year	Venue	Opponent	Score	Result
1978	Bangkok; Thailand	(China) Han Jian	– , –	Bronze
1979	Hangzhou; China	(China) Han Jian	14–18, 15–10, 3–15	Bronze

Men's doubles
Year	Venue	Partner	Opponent	Score	Result
1979	Hangzhou; China	(China) Yu Yaodong	(China) Sun Zhian (China) Yao Ximing	9–15, 3–15	Silver

=== Asian Games ===
Men's singles
Year	Venue	Opponent	Score	Result
1978	Bangkok, Thailand	(Indonesia) Liem Swie King	5–15, 13–18	Bronze

Men's doubles
Year	Venue	Partner	Opponent	Score	Result
1982	New Delhi, India	(China) Lin Jiangli	(Indonesia) Christian Hadinata (Indonesia) Icuk Sugiarto	6–15, 8–15	Silver

=== Asian Championships ===
Men's singles
Year	Venue	Opponent	Score	Result
1976	Hyderabad, India	(China) Hou Jiachang	Walkover	Bronze

=== International Tournaments ===
Men's singles
Year	Tournament	Opponent	Score	Result
1981	English Masters	(India) Prakash Padukone	15–9, 15–8	(gold) Winner
1982	All England Open	(Denmark) Morten Frost	15–11, 2–15, 7–15	(silver) Runner-up

Men's doubles
Year	Tournament	Partner	Opponent	Score	Result
1981	Scandinavian Cup	(China) Lin Jiangli	(Denmark) Morten Frost (Denmark) Steen Fladberg	15–11, 6–15, 15–12	(gold) Winner

=== IBF World Grand Prix ===
The World Badminton Grand Prix sanctioned by International Badminton Federation (IBF) from 1983 to 2006.

Men's singles
Year	Tournament	Opponent	Score	Result
1983	All England Open	(Denmark) Morten Frost	15–2, 12–15, 15–4	(gold) Winner
1983	World Grand Prix Finals	(Denmark) Morten Frost	15–2, 15–6	(gold) Winner

=== Invitational Tournament ===
Men's singles
Year	Tournament	Opponent	Score	Result
1977	Asian Invitational Badminton Championships	(China) Yu Yaodong	6–15, 8–15	(silver) Runner-up

Men's doubles
Year	Tournament	Partner	Opponent	Score	Result
1976	Asian Invitational Badminton Championships	(China) Tang Xianhu	(Indonesia) Ade Chandra (Indonesia) Christian Hadinata	8–15, 10–15	(silver) Runner-up
