= 1973 Singapore Open =

Tournament details
- Dates: 13 December 1973– 17 December 1973
- Edition: 40th
- Venue: Singapore Badminton Hall
- Location: Geylang, Singapore

Champions
- Men's singles: (Indonesia) Iie Sumirat
- Women's singles: (Thailand) Thongkam Kingmanee
- Men's doubles: (Indonesia) Tjun Tjun (Indonesia) Johan Wahjudi
- Women's doubles: (Indonesia) Theresia Widiastuti (Indonesia) Sri Wiyanti

The 1973 Singapore Open, also known as the 1973 Singapore Open Badminton Championships, took place from 13 to 17 December 1973 at the Singapore Badminton Hall in Singapore.

== Final results ==
Category	Winners	Runners-up	Score
Men's singles	(Indonesia) Iie Sumirat	(Indonesia) Tjun Tjun	15–3, 15–14
Women's singles	(Thailand) Thongkam Kingmanee	(Indonesia) Sri Wiyanti	11–4, 11–8
Men's doubles	(Indonesia) Tjun Tjun & Johan Wahjudi	(Indonesia) Christian Hadinata & Indra Gunawan	15–11, 15–11
Women's doubles	(Indonesia) Theresia Widiastuti & Sri Wiyanti	(Thailand) Thongkam Kingmanee & Sirisriro Patama	15–11, 15–10
