= Badminton Hall of Fame =

Badminton World Federation Hall of Fame
- Established: 1996
- Location: Kuala Lumpur, Malaysia
- Coordinates: 3.1547°N 101.7186°E
- Type: Professional sports hall of fame; museum
- President: Patama Leeswadtrakul

The Badminton World Federation (BWF) Hall of Fame is located in Kuala Lumpur, Malaysia. It honours both players and other contributors to the sport of badminton. The BWF Hall of Fame is a non-profit organization with the goal to preserve, celebrate, and inspire the sport of badminton around the world.

There is also a USA Badminton Hall of Fame and a Badminton Canada's Hall of Fame.

== Members ==
Being inducted into the BWF Hall of Fame is the ultimate honour in badminton. It represents the sum of one's achievements and contributions as being among the most important and transformative in badminton history. A player or contributor must be nominated to be inducted, and then the BWF governance committee reviews their eligibility before the recommendation is submitted to the BWF council for final deliberation. Nominees have to be members of the badminton fraternity who have retired from the sport for at least a period of five years. However, the governance committee will, under special circumstances, consider nominees still active in the sport.

=== Player category ===
Men's player
Women's player

Year	Name	Nationality	Category	Ref.
1996	George Thomas	England	MS; MD; XD	
1996	Betty Uber	England	WS; WD; XD	
1997	Ralph Nichols	England	MS; MD; XD	
1997	Eddy Choong	Malaysia	MS; MD; XD	
1997	Tonny Ahm	Denmark	WS; WD; XD	
1997	Frank Devlin	Ireland	MS; MD; XD	
1997	David Guthrie Freeman	United States	MS; MD; XD	
1997	Rudy Hartono	Indonesia	MS	
1997	Judy Devlin	United States; England	WS; WD; XD	
1997	Finn Kobberø	Denmark	MS; MD; XD	
1997	Erland Kops	Denmark	MS; MD	
1998	David E. L. Choong	Malaysia	MS; MD; XD	
1998	Morten Frost	Denmark	MS; MD	
1998	Jørgen Hammergaard Hansen	Denmark	MS; MD; XD	
1998	Han Aiping	China	WS; WD	
1998	Lene Køppen	Denmark	WS; WD; XD	
1998	Li Lingwei	China	WS; WD	
1998	Meriel Lucas	England	WS; WD; XD	
1998	Ng Boon Bee	Malaysia	MD; XD	
1998	Ong Poh Lim	Malaysia; Singapore	MS; MD	
1998	Tan Yee Khan	Malaysia	MS; MD; XD	
1999	Gillian Gilks	England	WS; WD; XD	
1999	Nora Perry	England	WD; XD	
1999	Ulla Strand	Denmark	WS; WD; XD	
1999	Margaret Tragett	England	WS; WD; XD	
1999	Margaret Varner Bloss	United States	WS; WD	
1999	Wong Peng Soon	Malaysia; Singapore	MS; MD	
2000	Kirsten Thorndahl	Denmark	WS; WD; XD	
2000	Charoen Wattanasin	Thailand	MS; MD; XD	
2001	Christian Hadinata	Indonesia	MS; MD; XD	
2001	Park Joo-bong	South Korea	MS; MD; XD	
2002	Chen Yuniang	China	WS; WD; XD	
2002	Hiroe Yuki	Japan	WS; WD	
2002	Hou Jiachang	China	MS; MD	
2002	Kim Moon-soo	South Korea	MD; XD	
2002	Liem Swie King	Indonesia	MS; MD	
2002	Tang Xianhu	China	MS; MD; XD	
2003	Chung Myung-hee	South Korea	WD; XD	
2003	Chung So-young	South Korea	WD; XD	
2004	Susi Susanti	Indonesia	WS; WD; XD	
2008	Ge Fei	China	WS; WD; XD	
2008	Gu Jun	China	WS; WD; XD	
2008	Ethel Thomson Larcombe	England	WS; WD; XD	
2008	Thomas Lund	Denmark	MD; XD	
2009	Gil Young-ah	South Korea	WD; XD	
2009	Tjun Tjun	Indonesia	MS; MD; XD	
2009	Johan Wahjudi	Indonesia	MD; XD	
2009	Susan Whetnall	England	WS; WD; XD	
2009	Ye Zhaoying	China	WS; WD	
2009	Kim Dong-moon	South Korea	MD; XD	
2009	Rexy Mainaky	Indonesia	MD; XD	
2009	Ra Kyung-min	South Korea	WS; WD; XD	
2009	Ricky Subagja	Indonesia	MD; XD	
2011	Gao Ling	China	WD; XD	
2011	Huang Sui	China	WD; XD	
2011	Li Yongbo	China	MD	
2011	Tian Bingyi	China	MS; MD	
2011	Zhang Jun	China	MD; XD	
2011	Gong Zhichao	China	WS	
2012	Ha Tae-kwon	South Korea	MD; XD	
2019	Bang Soo-hyun	South Korea	WS	
2021	Cai Yun	China	MD	
2021	Fu Haifeng	China	MD	
2021	Zhang Ning	China	WS	
2022	Liliyana Natsir	Indonesia	WD; XD	
2022	Zhao Yunlei	China	WD; XD	
2023	Lee Chong Wei	Malaysia	MS	
2023	Lin Dan	China	MS	
2024	Chen Long	China	MS	
2024	Lee Yong-dae	South Korea	MD; XD	

=== Contributor category ===
Name	Life span	Nationality	Year inducted	Ref.
Dolby, Seymour Sackville Carew	1857–1921	England	1996	
Lü, Shengrong	1940–present	China	2008	
McCallum, John Dunwoodie Martin	1883–1967	Ireland	1997	
Mohlin, Stellan	1925–2018	Sweden	1997	
Reedie, Craig Collins	1941–present	Scotland	1997	
Scheele, Herbert	1905–1981	England	1996	
Sudirman, Dick	1922–1986	Indonesia	1997	

=== Nationalities ===
Country	# of members
China	21
England	12^{A}
Indonesia	10
South Korea	10
Denmark	9
Malaysia	7^{B}
United States	3^{A}
Ireland	2
Singapore	2^{B}
Scotland	1
Sweden	1
Thailand	1
Japan	1

== Notes ==
A.Count include Hall of Fame 1997 inductee Judy Devlin, who competed for the United States from 1954 to 1970 and for England from 1971 to 1973, before retiring from the sport.
B.Count include Hall of Fame 1998 inductee Ong Poh Lim and 1999 inductee Wong Peng Soon, both are Singapore state players and represented the Federation of Malaya (present-day Peninsular Malaysia) when it was still a single nation. Singapore gained independence in 1965.

== See also ==
- List of sports awards honoring women
