= Iie Sumirat =

Indonesian badminton player (1950–2025)

Personal information
- Born: 15 November 1950 Bandung, West Java, Indonesia
- Died: 22 July 2025 (aged 74)

Sport
- Country: Indonesia
- Sport: Badminton
- Handedness: Right
- Event: Men's singles
Medal record
Men's badminton
Representing Indonesia
World Championships
Bronze medal – third place	1977 Malmö	Men's singles
World Cup
Silver medal – second place	1979 Tokyo	Men's singles
Thomas Cup
Gold medal – first place	1976 Bangkok	Men's team
Gold medal – first place	1979 Jakarta	Men's team
Asian Games
Gold medal – first place	1978 Bangkok	Men's team
Bronze medal – third place	1978 Bangkok	Men's singles
Asian Championships
Gold medal – first place	1976 Hyderabad	Men's team

Iie Sumirat (15 November 1950 – 22 July 2025) was an Indonesian badminton player. Sumirat emerged in the early 1970s as one of Indonesia's leading men's singles players during the golden era when Indonesia dominated international men's badminton.

== Career ==
He emerged in the early seventies as a right handed singles specialist with a style that people at the time described as brutal yet deceptive, a hard smash that came down like a hammer from his tall frame, combined with soft, almost dishonest touches at the net that made opponents hesitate. At that time world badminton was split. The International Badminton Federation ran the official circuit dominated by Indonesia, Denmark and Malaysia, while China, with legends like Hou Jiachang and Tang Xianhu, competed only in invitation and Asian events. Iie lived right in that divide.

His defining moment came in March 1976, a weekend that Indonesian badminton fans still talk about. In London, Rudy Hartono was winning his eighth All England title, cementing his status as the greatest of all time. On the same days in Bangkok, at the Asian Invitational Championships, a major regional tournament for Asia that was so important at that time because it was one of the few events where China and the IBF-affiliated Asian nations like Indonesia and Malaysia could meet, Iie Sumirat fought his way to the final and faced Hou Jiachang himself, the Chinese master who was older but still considered untouchable in technique. Iie edged him in three games, a victory that meant more than a trophy, it was proof that the Indonesian attacking style could beat the Chinese control game on the Asian stage.

The next year the sport finally unified its World Championships. At the first IBF World Championships in Malmö, Sweden in 1977, Iie reached the semi final, playing with the same fearless attack, only to run into Flemming Delfs of Denmark, a left handed tactician who would go on to become the first official world champion. The loss gave Iie a bronze medal, but it placed him firmly among the world's top four.

His name is most deeply written in the history of the Thomas Cup, the men's world team championship. In 1976 in Bangkok, Indonesia was under immense pressure to keep the cup. Iie was trusted as second singles behind Hartono, winning crucial matches that kept the team alive. Three years later in Jakarta in 1979, the role repeated but with even more dominance. Behind a young Liem Swie King as first singles, Iie as second singles was part of a squad that did not lose a single match in the semi final against Denmark and the final against the same opponent, a complete shutout that is still remembered as one of the most dominant Thomas Cup wins ever. He also stood on the podium at the 1979 World Cup in Tokyo, won team gold and singles bronze at the Asian Games in Bangkok in 1978, team gold at the 1976 Asian Championships in Hyderabad, and had earlier announced himself internationally by winning the Singapore Open in 1972 against Malaysia's Tan Aik Mong.

After retirement from paying, Sumirat became a coach. He was particularly noted for his work with Taufik Hidayat. For many years he coached in Bandung and at the national training center. He died on July 22, 2025 at the age of 74.

== Achievements ==
=== World Championships ===
Men's singles
Year	Venue	Opponent	Score	Result	Ref.
1977	Malmö Isstadion; Malmö, Sweden	(Denmark) Flemming Delfs	1–15, 17–18	Bronze	

=== World Cup ===
Men's singles
Year	Venue	Opponent	Score	Result	Ref.
1979	Tokyo, Japan	(Indonesia) Liem Swie King	8–15, 8–15	Silver	

=== Asian Games ===
Men's singles
Year	Venue	Opponent	Score	Result	Ref.
1978	Indoor Stadium Huamark; Bangkok, Thailand	(China) Han Jian	5–15, 1–15	Bronze	

=== International tournaments (2 titles, 4 runners-up) ===
Men's singles
Year	Tournament	Opponent	Score	Result	Ref.
1972	Singapore Open	(Malaysia) Tan Aik Mong	15–5, 15–11	(gold) Winner	
1972	Jakarta Open	(Indonesia) Rudy Hartono	4–15, 5–15	(silver) Runner-up	
1973	Singapore Open	(Indonesia) Tjun Tjun	15–3, 15–14	(gold) Winner	
1980	Chinese Taipei Open	(Denmark) Flemming Delfs	7–15, 15–8, 16–18	(silver) Runner-up	

Men's doubles
Year	Tournament	Partner	Opponent	Score	Result	Ref.
1970	Singapore Open	(Indonesia) Nara Sudjana	(Indonesia) Indratno (Indonesia) Indra Gunawan	10–15, 7–15	(silver) Runner-up	
1974	Denmark Open	(Indonesia) Christian Hadinata	(Indonesia) Tjun Tjun (Indonesia) Johan Wahjudi	14–18, 9–15	(silver) Runner-up	

=== Invitational tournament ===
Men's singles
Year	Tournament	Opponent	Score	Result	Ref.
1976	Asian Invitational Championships	(China) Hou Jiachang	12–15, 15–8, 18–15	Gold	
