= 1976 Asian Invitational Badminton Championships =

Badminton championships

Tournament details
- Dates: 24 – 28 March
- Edition: 1
- Venue: Indoor Stadium Huamark
- Location: Bangkok, Thailand

The 1976 Asian Invitational Badminton Championships which was the first edition of Asian Invitational Championships took place in the month of March in Bangkok, Thailand. The individual competitions except Mixed doubles were conducted. At the end of day, Indonesia took titles from two disciplines, Men's singles and Men's doubles competitions while China won Women's singles and Malaysia secured Women's doubles title.

== Medalists ==
Discipline	Gold	Silver	Bronze
Men's singles	(Indonesia) Iie Sumirat	(China) Hou Jiachang	(China) Tang Xianhu
Women's singles	(China) Liang Qiuxia	(Indonesia) Verawaty Fadjrin	(China) Chen Yuniang
Men's doubles	(Indonesia) Ade Chandra (Indonesia) Christian Hadinata	(China) Luan Jin (China) Tang Xianhu	(Thailand) Bandid Jaiyen (Thailand) Pichai Kongsiritaworn
Women's doubles	(Malaysia) Rosalind Singha Ang (Malaysia) Sylvia Ng	(Thailand) Kingmanee Thongkam (Thailand) Sirisriro Patama	(China) Fu Chune (China) Liang Qiuxia

== Men's singles ==
Semifinal
(China) Tang Xianhu	9	15	6
(Indonesia) Iie Sumirat	15	12	15
(China) Luan Jin	2	5
(China) Hou Jiachang	15	15

Final
(Indonesia) Iie Sumirat	12	15	18
(China) Hou Jiachang	15	8	15
Third place
(China) Tang Xianhu	15	15
(China) Luan Jin	5	2

== Women's singles ==
Semifinal
(China) Liang Qiuxia	11	11
(Malaysia) Sylvia Ng	2	4
(China) Chen Yuniang	3	9
(Indonesia) Verawaty Fadjrin	11	12

Final
(China) Liang Qiuxia	8	11	11
(Indonesia) Verawaty Fadjrin	11	0	5
Third place
(Malaysia) Sylvia Ng	4	6
(China) Chen Yuniang	11	11

== Men's doubles ==
Semi-finals
(Indonesia) Ade Chandra (Indonesia) Christian Hadinata	15	15
(Thailand) Bandid Jaiyen (Thailand) Pichai Kongsiritaworn	8	3
(Thailand) Pornchai Sakuntaniyom (Thailand) Preecha Sopajaree	17	10	4
(China) Luan Jin (China) Tang Xianhu	16	15	15

Final
(Indonesia) Ade Chandra (Indonesia) Christian Hadinata	15	15
(China) Luan Jin (China) Tang Xianhu	8	10
Third place
(Thailand) Bandid Jaiyen (Thailand) Pichai Kongsiritaworn
(Thailand) Pornchai Sakuntaniyom (Thailand) Preecha Sopajaree

== Women's doubles ==
Semi-finals
(Malaysia) Rosalind Singha Ang (Malaysia) Sylvia Ng	15	15
(Thailand) Porntip Buntanon (Thailand) Suleeporn Jittariyakul	5	3
(China) Fu Chune (China) Liang Qiuxia	14	8
(Thailand) Kingmanee Thongkam (Thailand) Sirisriro Patama	18	15

Final
(Malaysia) Rosalind Singha Ang (Malaysia) Sylvia Ng	15	18
(Thailand) Kingmanee Thongkam (Thailand) Sirisriro Patama	9	14
Third place
(Thailand) Porntip Buntanon (Thailand) Suleeporn Jittariyakul	7	11
(China) Fu Chune (China) Liang Qiuxia	15	15
