= 1979 WBF World Championships =

Tournament details
- Dates: 10 to 21 June
- Edition: 2
- Location: Hangzhou, China

The 1979 WBF World Championships took place in June 1979 in Hangzhou, China. It was one of the two editions of the world championships organised by the WBF, which was a rival body of the Badminton World Federation.

== Medalists ==
Event	Gold	Silver	Bronze
Men's singles	(China) Han Jian	(Pakistan) Tariq Wadood	(China) Luan Jin
Men's singles	(China) Han Jian	(Pakistan) Tariq Wadood	(China) Lin Yixiong
Women's singles	(China) Han Aiping	(China) Fu Chun-e	(China) Xu Rong
Women's singles	(China) Han Aiping	(China) Fu Chun-e	(China) Liu Xia
Men's doubles	(China) Sun Zhian (China) Yao Ximing	(China) Yu Yaodong (China) Luan Jin	(Thailand) Sawei Chanseorasmee (Thailand) Sarit Pisudchaikul
Men's doubles	(China) Sun Zhian (China) Yao Ximing	(China) Yu Yaodong (China) Luan Jin	(Hong Kong) Chan Tin Cheung (Hong Kong) Ng Chun Ching
Women's doubles (Note: For the women's doubles medalists, different sources report different rankings. While Berita Harian 22 June 1979 lists the present gold and silver medalists, New Nation 20 June 1979 ranks the below quarterfinal results involving Singapore in the semifinals. Thus, according to this source, Han Aiping and He Cuiling against Khin Khin Aye and Mya Lay Sein made the final and Singapore won both bronze medals. Sina (cn) again lists Sirisriro Patama and Suleeporn Jittariyakul as title holders according to the first source.)	(Thailand) Sirisriro Patama (Thailand) Suleeporn Jittariyakul	(China) Liu Xia (China) Zhang Ailing	(China) Han Aiping (China) He Cuiling
Women's doubles	(Thailand) Sirisriro Patama (Thailand) Suleeporn Jittariyakul	(China) Liu Xia (China) Zhang Ailing	(Myanmar) Khin Khin Aye (Myanmar) Mya Lay Sein
Mixed doubles	(Hong Kong) Ng Chun Ching (Hong Kong) Chan Lim Chee	(Myanmar) Wai Nyunt (Myanmar) Mya Lay Sein	(Thailand) Bandid Jaiyen (Thailand) Jutatip Banjongsilp
Mixed doubles	(Hong Kong) Ng Chun Ching (Hong Kong) Chan Lim Chee	(Myanmar) Wai Nyunt (Myanmar) Mya Lay Sein	(Thailand) Preecha Sopajaree (Thailand) Thongkam Kingmanee
Men's team	China; Han Jian; Lin Yixiong; Luan Jin; Sun Zhian; Yao Ximing; Yu Yaodong	Thailand; Sawei Chanseorasmee; Bandid Jaiyen; Udom Luangpetcharaporn; Sarit Pisudchaikul; Preecha Sopajaree	Pakistan; Javed Iqbal; Zahid Maqbool; Hassan Shaheed; Nadeem Ur Rahman; Tariq Wadood
Women's team	China; Fu Chun’e; Han Aiping; Liu Xia; Xu Rong; Zhang Ailing	Thailand; Jutatip Banjongsilp; Phanwad Jinasuyanont; Suleeporn Jittariyakul; Thongkam Kingmanee; Sirisriro Patama	Burma; Kyaw Kyaw; Mya Lay Sein; Khin Khin Aye; Win Ngwe

== Final stage ==
=== Men's singles ===
Third round
(China) Han Jian	15	15
(Thailand) Sawei Chanseorasmee	4	7
(Pakistan) Nadeem Ur Rahman	15	15
(Thailand) Udom Luengpetcharaporn	6	8
(China) Luan Jin	15	15
(North Korea) Kim Jong-guk	4	9
(Thailand) Bandid Jaiyen	15	15
(Philippines) Errol Chan	7	7
(Pakistan) Tariq Wadood	15	15
(Thailand) Sarit Pisudchaikul	5	4
(China) Yu Yaodong	15	15
(Hong Kong) Chan Chi Choi	8	1
(China) Lin Yixiong	15	15
(Singapore) Lee Hai Thong	8	11
(Singapore) Wong Shoon Keat

Quarterfinals
(China) Han Jian	15	15
(Pakistan) Nadeem Ur Rahman	2	2
(China) Luan Jin	15	15
(Thailand) Bandid Jaiyen	2	8
(Pakistan) Tariq Wadood	15	15
(China) Yu Yaodong	9	11
(China) Lin Yixiong	15	15
(Singapore) Wong Shoon Keat	3	2

Semifinals
(China) Han Jian	18	10	15
(China) Luan Jin	14	15	3
(Pakistan) Tariq Wadood	5	15	15
(China) Lin Yixiong	15	10	11

Final
(China) Han Jian	15	15
(Pakistan) Tariq Wadood	0	11

=== Women's singles ===
Quarterfinals
1	(China) Han Aiping	w.o.
8	(Singapore) Tay Hoe See
4	(China) Liu Xia	11	11
5	(North Korea) Ri Chung Sun	1	3
3	(China) Fu Chun-e	11	11
6	(Thailand) Phanwad Jinasuyanont	5	3
2	(China) Xu Rong	11	11
7	(Thailand) Sirisriro Patama	2	4

Semifinals
(China) Han Aiping	4	11	11
(China) Liu Xia	11	7	0
(China) Fu Chun-e	11	11
(China) Xu Rong	1	3

Finals
(China) Han Aiping	9	11	11
(China) Fu Chun-e	11	0	4

=== Men's doubles ===
Quarterfinals
(China) Sun Zhian (China) Yao Ximing
(Hong Kong) Chan Tin Cheung (Hong Kong) Ng Chun Ching
(China) Yu Yaodong (China) Luan Jin
(Thailand) Sawei Chanseorasmee (Thailand) Sarit Pisudchaikul

Semifinals
(China) Sun Zhian (China) Yao Ximing	15	15
(Hong Kong) Chan Tin Cheung (Hong Kong) Ng Chun Ching	3	9
(China) Yu Yaodong (China) Luan Jin	17	15	15
(Thailand) Sawei Chanseorasmee (Thailand) Sarit Pisudchaikul	18	11	3

Finals
(China) Sun Zhian (China) Yao Ximing	15	15
(China) Yu Yaodong (China) Luan Jin	9	3

=== Women's doubles ===
Quarterfinals
(Thailand) Sirisriro Patama (Thailand) Suleeporn Jittariyakul
(Singapore) Cindy Cheong (Singapore) Juliana Lee	4	3
(China) Han Aiping (China) He Cuiling	15	15
(China) Liu Xia (China) Zhang Ailing
(Myanmar) Khin Khin Aye (Myanmar) Mya Lay Sein	15	15
(Singapore) Leong Kay Sine (Singapore) Tay Hoe See	7	4

Semifinals
(Thailand) Sirisriro Patama (Thailand) Suleeporn Jittariyakul	15	15
(China) Han Aiping (China) He Cuiling	12	12
(China) Liu Xia (China) Zhang Ailing	15	15
(Myanmar) Khin Khin Aye (Myanmar) Mya Lay Sein	7	7

Finals
(Thailand) Sirisriro Patama (Thailand) Suleeporn Jittariyakul	15	15
(China) Liu Xia (China) Zhang Ailing	10	11

=== Mixed doubles ===
Quarterfinals
(Hong Kong) Ng Chun Ching (Hong Kong) Chan Lim Chee	w.o.
(Singapore) Lim Teck Heng (Singapore) Tay Hoe See
(Thailand) Bandid Jaiyen (Thailand) Jutatip Banjongsilp	15	15
(Nigeria) Babatunde Badiru (Nigeria) Bukola Bakreen	2	9
(Myanmar) Wai Nyunt (Myanmar) Mya Lay Sein	13	15	15
(Singapore) Tan Eng Han (Singapore) Leong Kay Sine	15	10	12
(Thailand) Preecha Sopajaree (Thailand) Thongkam Kingmanee	15	15
(North Korea) Kim Jong Guk (North Korea) Ri Chung Sun	3	2

Semifinals
(Hong Kong) Ng Chun Ching (Hong Kong) Chan Lim Chee
(Thailand) Bandid Jaiyen (Thailand) Jutatip Banjongsilp
(Myanmar) Wai Nyunt (Myanmar) Mya Lay Sein
(Thailand) Preecha Sopajaree (Thailand) Thongkam Kingmanee

Finals
(Hong Kong) Ng Chun Ching (Hong Kong) Chan Lim Chee	15	10	18
(Myanmar) Wai Nyunt (Myanmar) Mya Lay Sein	10	15	16

== Medal table ==
* Host nation (China)

Rank	Nation	Gold	Silver	Bronze	Total
1	China (CHN)*	5	3	5	13
2	Thailand (THA)	1	2	3	6
3	Hong Kong (HKG)	1	0	1	2
4	Burma (BIR)	0	1	2	3
5	Pakistan (PAK)	0	1	1	2
Totals (5 entries)		7	7	12	26
