= Mya Lay Sein =

Burmese politician and former Badminton player

Her Excellency Wunna Kyawhtin Dr Mya Lay Sein
- မြလေးစိန်

Deputy Minister for Health and Sports
- In office 2 July 2018 – 1 February 2021
- President: Win Myint
- Minister: Myint Htwe
- Preceded by: Thaung Htike
- Succeeded by: Myo Hlaing

Vice Chairman of Myanmar Olympic Committee
- In office 2 July 2018 – 1 February 2021

Personal details
- Born: 1954 (age 71–72)
- Education: Institute of Medicine 1, Yangon; University of New South Wales
- Occupation: Physiologist

Mya Lay Sein
Medal record

Women's badminton

Representing Burma

World Championships
Silver medal – second place	1979 Hangzhou	Mixed doubles
Bronze medal – third place	1979 Hangzhou	Women's team

Southeast Asian Games
Bronze medal – third place	1975 Bangkok	Women's doubles
Bronze medal – third place	1979 Jakarta	Women's doubles
Bronze medal – third place	1979 Jakarta	Women's team

Mya Lay Sein (Burmese: မြလေးစိန်; born 1954) is a Burmese physiologist, former badminton player and Deputy Minister for Health and Sports for Myanmar from 2018 to 2021.

== Career ==
Mya has always been very active in sports, culminating in 15 years of international representation in badminton for Myanmar team. She was a silver medallist in the 1979 WBF World Championships with partner Wai Nyunt in mixed doubles category. At the same time she has also studied at Yangon Institute of Medicine 1 and graduated in 1982.

She received the certificate of the Postgraduate Training Sports Medicine from the Singapore Sports Council, the degrees of MSpMed (Master of Sports Medicine) and PhD (Sports Medicine & Shoulder) from the University of New South Wales, Australia. She served as the vice president of Myanmar Badminton Federation. On 2 July 2018, the president Win Myint appointed her as the deputy minister for Ministry of Health and Sports.

== Achievements ==
=== World Championships ===
Mixed doubles

Year	Venue	Partner	Opponent	Score	Result
1979	Hangzhou, China	(Myanmar) Wai Nyunt	(Hong Kong) Ng Chun Ching (Hong Kong) Amy Chan Lim Chee	10–15, 15–10, 16–18	Silver

=== Southeast Asian Games ===
Women's doubles

Year	Venue	Partner	Opponent	Score	Result
1975	Bangkok, Thailand	(Myanmar) Thida Aye Nyo	(Thailand) Porntip Buntanon (Thailand) Suleeporn Jittariyakul		Bronze
1979	Istora Gelora Bung Karno, Jakarta, Indonesia	(Myanmar) Thida Aye Nyo	(Indonesia) Verawaty Wiharjo (Indonesia) Imelda Wiguna	3–15, 8–15	Bronze
