= Yu Yaodong =

Chinese badminton player

Yu Yaodong 庾耀东
Personal information
- Born: 1951 Dongguan, Guangdong, China
- Died: 24 November 2012 (aged 60–61)

Sport
- Country: China
- Sport: Badminton
- Handedness: Left
- Retired: 1980
Medal record
Men's badminton
Representing China
World Championships
Gold medal – first place	1978 Bangkok	Men's singles
Gold medal – first place	1978 Bangkok	Men's doubles
Gold medal – first place	1979 Hangzhou	Men's team
Silver medal – second place	1979 Hangzhou	Men's doubles
Asian Games
Gold medal – first place	1974 Tehran	Men's team
Silver medal – second place	1978 Bangkok	Men's team
Bronze medal – third place	1978 Bangkok	Men's doubles
Bronze medal – third place	1978 Bangkok	Mixed doubles
Asian Championships
Silver medal – second place	1976 Hyderabad	Men's team

Yu Yaodong (Chinese: 庾耀东; pinyin: Yǔ Yàodōng; 1951–2012) was a badminton player from People's Republic of China.

== Career ==
Yu Yaodong was born in 1951 in Dongguan, Guangdong. He entered the Guangzhou Amateur Sports School in 1961 then entered the Guangdong team in 1965 and was finally selected for the national team in 1972. At the second ever Badminton World Championships (first by World Badminton Federation) held in Thailand in 1978, Yaodong defeated his teammate Han Jian in the men's singles final and became the first ever badminton world champion in Chinese history. Later, he along with Hou Jiachang won the title of men's doubles World Champion as well. On the day of the final, Deng Xiaoping came to the scene to watch the game and presented the award to Yu Yaodong. After retiring, Yu Yaodong served as the coach of the Guangdong Province badminton team, cultivating famous badminton players such as Xie Xingfang, Zhang Jiewen and Fu Haifeng.

== Achievements ==
=== World Championships ===
Men's singles
Year	Venue	Opponent	Score	Result
1978	Bangkok, Thailand	(China) Han Jian	15–11, 15–11	Gold

Men's doubles
Year	Venue	Partner	Opponent	Score	Result
1978	Bangkok, Thailand	(China) Hou Jiachang	(Thailand) Sawei Chanseorasmee (Thailand) Sarit Pisudchaikul	18–15, 15–12	Gold
1979	Hangzhou, China	(China) Luan Jin	(China) Sun Zhian (China) Yao Ximing	9–15, 3–15	Silver

=== Asian Games ===
Men's doubles
Year	Venue	Partner	Opponent	Score	Result
1978	Bangkok, Thailand	(China) Hou Jiachang	(Indonesia) Ade Chandra (Indonesia) Christian Hadinata	14–17, 7–15	Bronze

Mixed doubles
Year	Venue	Partner	Opponent	Score	Result
1978	Bangkok, Thailand	(China) Li Fang	(Indonesia) Hariamanto Kartono (Indonesia) Theresia Widiastuti	8–15, 11–15	Bronze

=== Invitational tournament ===
Men's singles
Year	Tournament	Opponent	Score	Result
1977	Asian Invitational Championships	(China) Luan Jin	15–6, 15–8	Gold
1978	World Invitational Championships	(China) Chen Tianlong	13–18, 8–15	Silver
1978	Asian Invitational Championships	(China) Chen Tianlong	12–15, 15–13, 15–10	Gold

Men's doubles
Year	Tournament	Partner	Opponent	Score	Result
1978	World Invitational Championships	(China) Hou Jiachang	(China) Lin Shiquan (China) Tang Xianhu	7–15, 1–15	Silver
