= Amy Chan (badminton) =

Hong Kong badminton player (born 1961)

Amy Chan 陳念慈
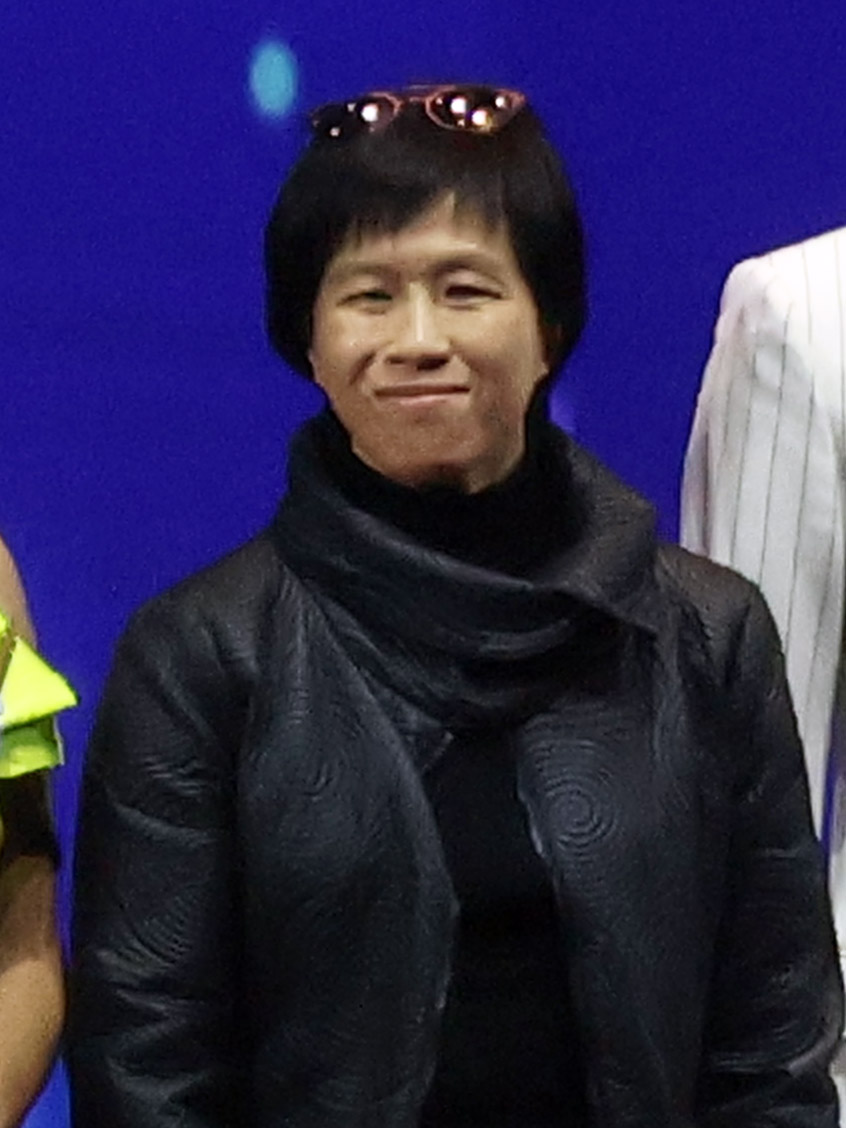

Personal information
- Full name: Amy Chan Lim-chee
- Born: 27 June 1961 (age 65) Hong Kong

Sport
- Country: Hong Kong
- Sport: Badminton
- Handedness: Right
- Event: Doubles

Doubles
- BWF profile
Medal record
Women's badminton
Representing Hong Kong
World Championships
Gold medal – first place	1979 Hangzhou	Mixed doubles
Commonwealth Games
Gold medal – first place	1990 Auckland	Mixed doubles
Bronze medal – third place	1990 Auckland	Mixed team

Amy Chan Lim-chee MBE (Chinese: 陳念慈; Jyutping: can4 nim6 ci4; born 27 June 1961) is a retired badminton player from Hong Kong who won gold medals in World Championships and Commonwealth Games.

== About ==
Chan grew up with two brothers and a sister named Chen Aici in the East Block of North Point New Village on Hong Kong Island during her early years. Her father worked as a clerk. She completed her education at Ho Tung Government Industrial Girls' High School (now known as Ho Tung Middle School) in 1980, followed by enrollment at Luo Phu Quoc Education College, where she finished her physical education course in 1983. Subsequently, she graduated from the Department of Physical Education at Springfield University in 1991. Chan achieved notable success in badminton, winning the women's singles championship in nine Hong Kong tournaments between 1975 and 1983. At the young age of 17 in 1979, she also secured the mixed doubles championship at the World Badminton Championships (WBF) alongside Ng Chun Ching.

In 1988, she represented Hong Kong in the 1988 Summer Olympics badminton competition (the current event was an exhibition event), and partnered with Chan Chi Choi to win the mixed doubles bronze medal. She represented Hong Kong in three Commonwealth Games across three disciplines, winning the mixed doubles gold medal in 1990. After her sporting career she became the first female headmistress of the Hong Kong jockey club apprentice Jockey's school which trains and develops future racing stars.

Amy contributes much to the society. She currently holds many leadership positions in various organizations and committees such as the Commission on Poverty, Prevention and Control of Non-communicable Disease, Hong Kong Paralympian Fund and the Hong Kong Elite Athletes Association. Her contribution to sports development and devotion to community service has made her a role model for many in Hong Kong.

== Honours ==
- Member of the Order of the British Empire (MBE) (1991)
- Ten Outstanding Young Persons in Hong Kong (1995)
- Honorary Fellow of The Education University of Hong Kong (2019)
- Bronze Bauhinia Star (BBS) (2024)

== Achievements ==
=== Olympic Games (exhibition) ===
Mixed doubles

Year	Venue	Partner	Opponents	Score	Result
1988	Seoul National University Gymnasium, Seoul, South Korea	(Hong Kong) Chan Chi Choi	(Canada) Mike Butler (Canada) Claire Backhouse-Sharpe	15–3, 11–15, 15–9	Bronze

=== World Championships ===
Mixed doubles
Year	Venue	Partner	Opponent	Score	Result
1979	Hangzhou; China	(Hong Kong) Ng Chun Ching	(Myanmar) Wai Nyunt (Myanmar) Mya Lay Sein	15–10, 10–15, 18–16	Gold

=== Commonwealth Games ===
Mixed doubles
Year	Venue	Partner	Opponent	Score	Result
1990	Auckland Badminton Hall; Auckland, New Zealand	(Hong Kong) Chan Chi Choi	(England) Miles Johnson (England) Sara Sankey	15–7, 15–12	Gold

=== IBF World Grand Prix ===
The World Badminton Grand Prix sanctioned by International Badminton Federation (IBF) from 1983 to 2006.

Mixed doubles
Year	Tournament	Partner	Opponent	Score	Result
1988	Hong Kong Open	(Hong Kong) Chan Chi Choi	(South Korea) Park Joo-bong (South Korea) Chung Myung-hee	7–15, 6–15	(silver) Runner-up
1989	Hong Kong Open	(Hong Kong) Chan Chi Choi	(South Korea) Choi Sang-bum (South Korea) Chung So-young	12–15, 18–16, 2–15	(silver) Runner-up
1989	China Open	(Hong Kong) Chan Chi Choi	(South Korea) Kim Hak-kyun (South Korea) Hwang Hye-young	13–18, 5–15	(silver) Runner-up

=== Invitational tournament ===
Mixed doubles
Year	Tournament	Partner	Opponent	Score	Result
1978	WBF World Invitational Championships	(Hong Kong) Fu Hon Ping	(China) Chen Tianlung (China) Kao Huilan	18–15, 15–11	Gold
