= Johan Wahjudi =

Indonesian badminton player (1953–2019)

Personal information
- Born: Johan Wahjudi; 10 February 1953 Malang, East Java, Indonesia
- Died: 15 November 2019 (aged 66) Malang, East Java Indonesia

Sport
- Country: Indonesia
- Sport: Badminton
Medal record
Men's badminton
Representing Indonesia
World Championships
Gold medal – first place	1977 Malmö	Men's doubles
Thomas Cup
Gold medal – first place	1976 Bangkok	Men's team
Gold medal – first place	1979 Jakarta	Men's team
Asian Games
Gold medal – first place	1974 Tehran	Men's doubles
Silver medal – second place	1974 Tehran	Men's team
SEA Games
Gold medal – first place	1977 Kuala Lumpur	Men's doubles
Gold medal – first place	1977 Kuala Lumpur	Men's team

Johan Wahjudi (Chinese: 洪耀龍; pinyin: Hóng Yàolóng; 10 February 1953 – 15 November 2019) was an Indonesian badminton player. Though he played some singles at the international level early in his career, he soon became a doubles specialist noted for his alert and consistent play alongside his more mercurial partner Tjun Tjun. The duo became the first ever men's doubles world number one in the first IBF world ranking release in 1978.

== Career ==
His legend was built together with his partner Tjun Tjun. Tjun Tjun was the more mercurial, explosive and powerful attacker, while Wahjudi was the wall behind him. He was the silent guardian who made very few mistakes, covered the court with intelligence, and allowed Tjun Tjun to play with freedom. Their contrasting styles complemented each other perfectly and created the most dominant men's doubles pair of the 1970s.

Their dominance is most clearly seen at the All England Open Badminton Championships. Between 1974 and 1980, they won six titles together in 1974, 1975, 1977, 1978, 1979 and 1980. During this period their losses were extremely rare and they were universally recognized as the clear world number one team. One of their most famous matches came in the 1979 All England semifinals against Japan's Yoshitaka Iino and Masao Tsuchida. After a close second game, the teams took the allotted five minute break, but the Indonesians returned a few seconds late and umpire Alan Jones announced their disqualification. They did not protest, but referee Herbert Scheele overruled the umpire. Down 4–12 in the deciding game, they staged a stirring fightback to win 15–6, 14–17, 18–17 to reach the final, which they eventually won.

In 1977, they made history by winning the men's doubles title at the very first World Championships held in Malmö, Sweden. A year later, when the International Badminton Federation released its first ever official world ranking in 1978, Tjun Tjun and Johan Wahjudi became the first ever men's doubles world number one in history.

Wahjudi was also a cornerstone of Indonesia's world-beating Thomas Cup teams. He played on the champion teams of 1976 in Bangkok and 1979 in Jakarta, winning all of his matches in partnership with Tjun Tjun. In thirteen Thomas Cup matches, the duo lost only once. In the 1976 final against Malaysia, Indonesia won 9–0 with Wahjudi contributing two winning points, and in the 1979 final against Denmark at Istora Senayan, the result was just as one sided.

Beyond those major titles, they also won gold in men's doubles and men's team at the 1974 Asian Games in Tehran, and gold at the 1977 SEA Games in Kuala Lumpur. Their era came to an end in the early eighties when Tjun Tjun began suffering from persistent back problems. After losing the 1981 All England final to their younger teammates Rudy Heryanto and Hariamanto Kartono, the legends called time on their career. After retirement, Wahjudi stayed close to the sport and founded his own club, PB Lotto. For their immense contribution to badminton, he and Tjun Tjun were inducted into the BWF Hall of Fame in 2009.

== Awards and nominations ==
Award	Year	Category	Result	Ref.
International Badminton Federation Awards	1986	Meritorious Service Award	Honored	
Badminton World Federation Awards	2009	Badminton Hall of Fame	Inducted	

== Achievements ==
=== World Championships ===
Men's doubles
Year	Venue	Partner	Opponent	Score	Result	Ref.
1977	Malmö Isstadion, Malmö, Sweden	(Indonesia) Tjun Tjun	(Indonesia) Ade Chandra (Indonesia) Christian Hadinata	15–6, 15–4	Gold	

=== Asian Games ===
Men's doubles
Year	Venue	Partner	Opponent	Score	Result	Ref.
1974	Amjadieh Sport Complex, Tehran, Iran	(Indonesia) Tjun Tjun	(Indonesia) Ade Chandra (Indonesia) Christian Hadinata	15–9, 15–7	Gold	

=== SEA Games ===
Men's doubles
Year	Venue	Partner	Opponent	Score	Result	Ref.
1977	Kuala Lumpur, Malaysia	(Indonesia) Tjun Tjun	(Thailand) Preecha Sopajaree (Thailand) Pichai Kongsirithavorn	15–10, 15–3	Gold	

=== International tournaments (12 titles, 2 runners-up) ===
Men's doubles
Year	Tournament	Partner	Opponent	Score	Result	Ref.
1973	Denmark Open	(Indonesia) Tjun Tjun	(Indonesia) Ade Chandra (Indonesia) Christian Hadinata	15–3, 15–7	(gold) Winner	
1973	German Open	(Indonesia) Tjun Tjun	(Indonesia) Ade Chandra (Indonesia) Christian Hadinata	15–4, 15–9	(gold) Winner	
1973	All England Open	(Indonesia) Tjun Tjun	(Indonesia) Ade Chandra (Indonesia) Christian Hadinata	1–15, 7–15	(silver) Runner-up	
1973	Singapore Open	(Indonesia) Tjun Tjun	(Indonesia) Indra Gunawan (Indonesia) Christian Hadinata	15–11, 15–11	(gold) Winner	
1974	Denmark Open	(Indonesia) Tjun Tjun	(Indonesia) Iie Sumirat (Indonesia) Christian Hadinata	18–14, 15–9	(gold) Winner	
1974	All England Open	(Indonesia) Tjun Tjun	(Indonesia) Ade Chandra (Indonesia) Christian Hadinata	15–8, 15–6	(gold) Winner	
1975	Denmark Open	(Indonesia) Tjun Tjun	(Indonesia) Ade Chandra (Indonesia) Christian Hadinata	15–6, 15–1	(gold) Winner	
1975	All England Open	(Indonesia) Tjun Tjun	(Indonesia) Ade Chandra (Indonesia) Christian Hadinata	15–11, 15–5	(gold) Winner	
1977	All England Open	(Indonesia) Tjun Tjun	(Indonesia) Ade Chandra (Indonesia) Christian Hadinata	15–7, 18–15	(gold) Winner	
1978	All England Open	(Indonesia) Tjun Tjun	(Indonesia) Ade Chandra (Indonesia) Christian Hadinata	15–12, 15–8	(gold) Winner	
1979	All England Open	(Indonesia) Tjun Tjun	(Sweden) Stefan Karlsson (Sweden) Claes Nordin	17–16, 15–3	(gold) Winner	
1980	All England Open	(Indonesia) Tjun Tjun	(England) Ray Stevens (England) Mike Tredgett	10–15, 15–9, 15–10	(gold) Winner	
1981	All England Open	(Indonesia) Tjun Tjun	(Indonesia) Rudy Heryanto (Indonesia) Hariamanto Kartono	9–15, 8–15	(silver) Runner-up	

Mixed doubles
Year	Tournament	Partner	Opponent	Score	Result	Ref.
1972	Singapore Open	(Indonesia) Regina Masli	(Thailand) Chirasak Champakao (Singapore) Liem Siew Choo	15–11, 15–7	(gold) Winner	

=== Invitational tournaments ===
Men's doubles
Year	Tournament	Partner	Opponent	Score	Result	Ref.
1972	World Invitational Championships	(Indonesia) Tjun Tjun	(Indonesia) Ade Chandra (Indonesia) Christian Hadinata	15–10, 15–10	Gold	
1974 (Glasgow)	World Invitational Championships	(Indonesia) Tjun Tjun	(Malaysia) Punch Gunalan (Malaysia) Dominic Soong	9–15, 4–15	Silver	
1974 (Jakarta)	World Invitational Championships	(Indonesia) Tjun Tjun	(Indonesia) Ade Chandra (Indonesia) Christian Hadinata	15–13, 9–15, 18–15	Gold	
1975	World Invitational Championships	(Indonesia) Tjun Tjun	(Indonesia) Ade Chandra (Indonesia) Christian Hadinata	15–12, 15–11	Gold	
1977	Asian Invitational Championships	(Indonesia) Tjun Tjun	(Indonesia) Ade Chandra (Indonesia) Christian Hadinata	14–17, 15–2, 15–5	Gold	

=== Other tournament ===
Men's doubles
Year	Tournament	Partner	Opponent	Score	Result	Ref.
1983	Veterans Tournament (30+)	(Indonesia) Tjun Tjun	(Indonesia) Dhany Sartika (Indonesia) Ade Chandra	15–10, 15–1	(gold) Winner	
