= Tjun Tjun =

Chinese-Indonesian badminton player

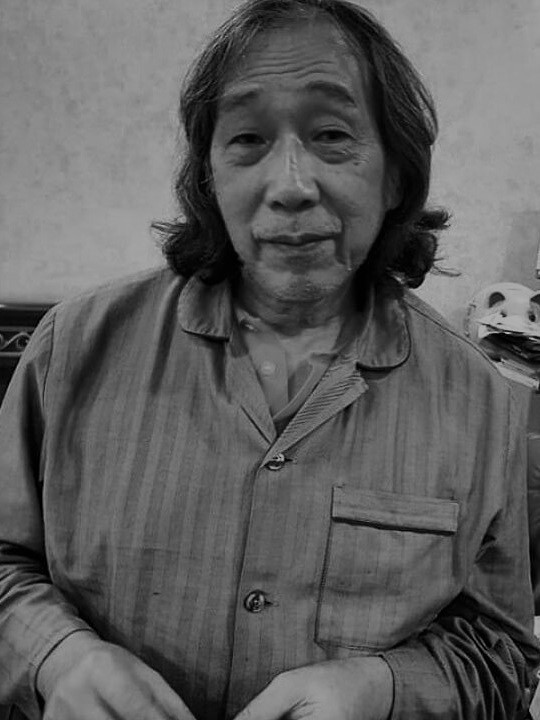

Personal information
- Born: Liang Chun-sheng; 4 October 1952 (age 74) Cirebon, West Java, Indonesia

Sport
- Country: Indonesia
- Sport: Badminton
Medal record
Men's badminton
Representing Indonesia
World Championships
Gold medal – first place	1977 Malmö	Men's doubles
Thomas Cup
Gold medal – first place	1973 Jakarta	Men's team
Gold medal – first place	1976 Bangkok	Men's team
Gold medal – first place	1979 Jakarta	Men's team
Asian Games
Gold medal – first place	1974 Tehran	Men's doubles
Silver medal – second place	1974 Tehran	Mixed doubles
Silver medal – second place	1974 Tehran	Men's team
Asian Championships
Gold medal – first place	1971 Jakarta	Men's team
Gold medal – first place	1976 Hyderabad	Men's team
Gold medal – first place	1976 Hyderabad	Men's doubles
Silver medal – second place	1971 Jakarta	Men's doubles
SEA Games
Gold medal – first place	1977 Kuala Lumpur	Men's doubles
Gold medal – first place	1977 Kuala Lumpur	Men's team

Tjun Tjun (Chinese: 梁春生; pinyin: Liáng Chūnshēng; born 4 October 1952) is an Indonesian badminton player. Though a world level singles player early in his career, he became one of the sport's greatest ever doubles specialists. His game was notable for its speed, power, accuracy, and aggressiveness.

== Career ==
The most glorious chapter of his playing career was written alongside his legendary partner Johan Wahjudi. Before this iconic partnership, Tjun Tjun had already gained valuable international experience playing doubles with another Indonesian legend, Rudy Hartono, which gave him a strong tactical foundation. However, it was with Wahjudi that he formed what many experts consider to be the most dominant men's doubles pair of the 1970s.

Together, they were clearly the number one team in the world during their prime period, a status that was undisputed by players and critics alike. Their dominance was so absolute that in the finals of many major international tournaments, they frequently had to face and defeat their own fellow countrymen, the other great Indonesian pair of Christian Hadinata and Ade Chandra, in what were often all-Indonesian finals that showcased Indonesia's complete supremacy in men's doubles at that time.

Tjun Tjun became world champion in men's doubles with Johan Wahjudi at the very first IBF World Championships held in 1977. They also won 6 of the 7 All England Open Badminton Championships held from 1974 through 1980. They were clearly the world's number one team during this period, often beating fellow countrymen Christian Hadinata and Ade Chandra in the finals of major events. The duo were the first ever men's doubles world number one in the first IBF world ranking release in 1978.

Beyond his success in individual and invitational tournaments, Tjun Tjun was also a national hero and a cornerstone of the Indonesian Thomas Cup team. The Thomas Cup, being the world men's team championship, was the ultimate test of a nation's depth and fighting spirit. Tjun Tjun answered that call with absolute perfection. Although he was primarily a doubles player, he was versatile enough to be fielded for a stint in singles when needed, and regularly in doubles, and in both roles he was flawless. He won all of his matches across three consecutive Thomas Cup campaigns in 1973, 1976, and 1979.

Each of those three campaigns ended with Indonesia winning the Thomas Cup and the world team title, with Tjun Tjun remaining undefeated across the three tournaments.

Playing one stint at singles and regularly in doubles (first with Rudy Hartono, and later with Wahjudi) Tjun Tjun won all of his matches in three consecutive Thomas Cup campaigns (1973, 1976, 1979), all of which resulted in world team titles for Indonesia.

Beyond those major titles, Tjun Tjun also captured gold in men's doubles and men's team at the 1974 Asian Games in Tehran, gold at the 1976 Asian Championships in Hyderabad, gold in both men's doubles and men's team at the 1977 SEA Games in Kuala Lumpur.

Their era ended in the early 1980s when Tjun Tjun began suffering from persistent back problems. After losing the 1981 All England final to their younger compatriots Rudy Heryanto and Hariamanto Kartono, the legendary pair retired. For their immense contribution to the sport, both Tjun Tjun and Johan Wahjudi were inducted into the BWF Hall of Fame in 2009.

== Personal life ==
Tjun Tjun is of Chinese descent. He is the brother of Liang Qiuxia, who is also a badminton player and coach.

== Awards and nominations ==
Award	Year	Category	Result	Ref.
International Badminton Federation Awards	1986	Meritorious Service Award	Honored	
Badminton World Federation Awards	2009	Badminton Hall of Fame	Inducted	

== Achievements ==
=== World Championships ===
Men's doubles
Year	Venue	Partner	Opponent	Score	Result	Ref.
1977	Malmö Isstadion, Malmö, Sweden	(Indonesia) Johan Wahjudi	(Indonesia) Ade Chandra (Indonesia) Christian Hadinata	15–6, 15–4	Gold	

=== Asian Games ===
Men's doubles
Year	Venue	Partner	Opponent	Score	Result	Ref.
1974	Amjadieh Sport Complex, Tehran, Iran	(Indonesia) Johan Wahjudi	(Indonesia) Christian Hadinata (Indonesia) Ade Chandra	15–9, 15–7	Gold	

Mixed doubles
Year	Venue	Partner	Opponent	Score	Result	Ref.
1974	Amjadieh Sport Complex, Tehran, Iran	(Indonesia) Sri Wiyanti	(Indonesia) Christian Hadinata (Indonesia) Regina Masli	10–15, 8–15	Silver	

=== Asian Championships ===
Men's doubles
Year	Venue	Partner	Opponent	Score	Result	Ref.
1971	Istora Senayan, Jakarta, Indonesia	(Indonesia) Tata Budiman	(Indonesia) Indra Gunawan (Indonesia) Nara Sudjana	8–15, 15–12, 11–15	Silver	
1976	Lal Bahadur Shastri Stadium, Hyderabad; India	(Indonesia) Ade Chandra	(China) Yao Ximing (China) Sun Zhi’an	Walkover	Gold	

=== SEA Games ===
Men's doubles
Year	Venue	Partner	Opponent	Score	Result	Ref.
1977	Kuala Lumpur, Malaysia	(Indonesia) Johan Wahjudi	(Thailand) Preecha Sopajaree (Thailand) Pichai Kongsirithavorn	15–10, 15–3	Gold	

=== International tournaments (14 titles, 3 runners-up) ===
Men's singles
Year	Tournament	Opponent	Score	Result	Ref.
1973	German Open	(Sweden) Sture Johnsson	5–15, 15–12, 5–15	(silver) Runner-up	
1973	Singapore Open	(Indonesia) Iie Sumirat	3–15, 14–15	(silver) Runner-up	
1975	Silver Bowl International	(New Zealand) Ross Livingston	15–4, 15–8	(gold) Winner	

Men's doubles
Year	Tournament	Partner	Opponent	Score	Result	Ref.
1973	Denmark Open	(Indonesia) Johan Wahjudi	(Indonesia) Ade Chandra (Indonesia) Christian Hadinata	15–3, 15–7	(gold) Winner	
1973	German Open	(Indonesia) Johan Wahjudi	(Indonesia) Ade Chandra (Indonesia) Christian Hadinata	15–4, 15–9	(gold) Winner	
1973	All England Open	(Indonesia) Johan Wahjudi	(Indonesia) Ade Chandra (Indonesia) Christian Hadinata	1–15, 7–15	(silver) Runner-up	
1973	Singapore Open	(Indonesia) Johan Wahjudi	(Indonesia) Indra Gunawan (Indonesia) Christian Hadinata	15–11, 15–11	(gold) Winner	
1974	Denmark Open	(Indonesia) Johan Wahjudi	(Indonesia) Iie Sumirat (Indonesia) Christian Hadinata	18–14, 15–9	(gold) Winner	
1974	All England Open	(Indonesia) Johan Wahjudi	(Indonesia) Ade Chandra (Indonesia) Christian Hadinata	15–8, 15–6	(gold) Winner	
1975	Denmark Open	(Indonesia) Johan Wahjudi	(Indonesia) Ade Chandra (Indonesia) Christian Hadinata	15–6, 15–1	(gold) Winner	
1975	All England Open	(Indonesia) Johan Wahjudi	(Indonesia) Ade Chandra (Indonesia) Christian Hadinata	15–11, 15–5	(gold) Winner	
1977	Swedish Open	(Indonesia) Ade Chandra	(Sweden) Bengt Fröman (Sweden) Thomas Kihlström	17–18, 17–16, 15–11	(gold) Winner	
1977	All England Open	(Indonesia) Johan Wahjudi	(Indonesia) Ade Chandra (Indonesia) Christian Hadinata	15–7, 18–15	(gold) Winner	
1978	All England Open	(Indonesia) Johan Wahjudi	(Indonesia) Ade Chandra (Indonesia) Christian Hadinata	15–12, 15–8	(gold) Winner	
1979	All England Open	(Indonesia) Johan Wahjudi	(Sweden) Stefan Karlsson (Sweden) Claes Nordin	17–16, 15–3	(gold) Winner	
1980	All England Open	(Indonesia) Johan Wahjudi	(England) Ray Stevens (England) Mike Tredgett	10–15, 15–9, 15–10	(gold) Winner	
1981	All England Open	(Indonesia) Johan Wahjudi	(Indonesia) Rudy Heryanto (Indonesia) Hariamanto Kartono	9–15, 8–15	(silver) Runner-up	

Mixed doubles
Year	Tournament	Partner	Opponent	Score	Result	Ref.
1975	Denmark Open	(Indonesia) Regina Masli	(Denmark) Klaus Kaagaard (Netherlands) Joke van Beusekom	15–6, 7–15, 17–14	(gold) Winner	

=== Invitational tournaments ===
Men's singles
Year	Tournament	Opponent	Score	Result	Ref.
1974 (Jakarta)	World Invitational Championships	(Denmark) Svend Pri	15–3, 16–17, 0–15	Silver	

Men's doubles
Year	Tournament	Partner	Opponent	Score	Result	Ref.
1972	World Invitational Championships	(Indonesia) Johan Wahjudi	(Indonesia) Ade Chandra (Indonesia) Christian Hadinata	15–10, 15–10	Gold	
1974 (Glasgow)	World Invitational Championships	(Indonesia) Johan Wahjudi	(Malaysia) Punch Gunalan (Malaysia) Dominic Soong	9–15, 4–15	Silver	
1974 (Jakarta)	World Invitational Championships	(Indonesia) Johan Wahjudi	(Indonesia) Ade Chandra (Indonesia) Christian Hadinata	15–13, 9–15, 18–15	Gold	
1975	World Invitational Championships	(Indonesia) Johan Wahjudi	(Indonesia) Ade Chandra (Indonesia) Christian Hadinata	15–12, 15–11	Gold	
1977	Asian Invitational Championships	(Indonesia) Johan Wahjudi	(Indonesia) Ade Chandra (Indonesia) Christian Hadinata	14–17, 15–2, 15–5	Gold	

Mixed doubles
Year	Tournament	Partner	Opponent	Score	Result	Ref.
1974 (Jakarta)	World Invitational Championships	(Indonesia) Sri Wiyanti	(Indonesia) Christian Hadinata (Indonesia) Regina Masli	7–15, 3–15	Silver	

=== Other tournament ===
Men's doubles
Year	Tournament	Partner	Opponent	Score	Result	Ref.
1983	Veterans Tournament (30+)	(Indonesia) Johan Wahjudi	(Indonesia) Dhany Sartika (Indonesia) Ade Chandra	15–10, 15–1	(gold) Winner	
