= World Badminton Federation =

Defunct badminton organization

The World Badminton Federation was a former badminton organization, it was founded in February 1978 and ceased its operation on May 26, 1981, after it merged with the International Badminton Federation (now known as Badminton World Federation or BWF).

== History ==
=== Establishment ===
The World Badminton Federation was established as a result of the dissatisfaction of some badminton nations, led by then non-IBF member China, with the policies of the International Badminton Federation, the governing body of international badminton formed in the 1930s. The two main issues were the IBF's acceptance of Taiwan (ROC) as a national organization, and its refusal to dismiss the South African association due to the apartheid policies of the then South African government.

Conferences called by the Asian Badminton Confederation (now known as the Badminton Asia Confederation) were held in September and November 1977 which resulted in the withdrawal of the African Badminton Union (now Badminton Confederation of Africa) from the IBF. The founding of the World Badminton Federation was officially proclaimed at a third conference held in Hong Kong in February 1978. Twenty-two nations and regions, nearly all from Asia or Africa joined the federation: Bangladesh, Brunei, China, Ghana, Guyana, Hong Kong, India, Iran, Kenya, Malaysia, Mauritius, Nepal, Nigeria, North Korea, Pakistan, Philippines, Singapore, South Korea, Sri Lanka, Tanzania, Thailand and Zambia. Austria, France, Mexico (on behalf of the Pan American Badminton Confederation), Sweden, West Germany and Yugoslavia sent non-voting observers to attend the conference.

During its establishment, the World Badminton Federation organized two editions of its own World Championship, one held in Bangkok in 1978, the other in Hangzhou in 1979.

=== Union ===
The union with the International Badminton Federation was brought into being following the decision of Taiwan to change the name of its organization to the Chinese Taipei Badminton Association and a promise from South African Badminton Union not to participate in the Thomas and Uber Cups or IBF World Championships. Relatively minor changes in voting rules were also approved.

In March 1981, a special conference was held with the voting result of 57 to 4 in support of unification. On May 26, 1981, the World Badminton Federation officially united with International Badminton Federation.
