= Tang Xianhu =

Chinese badminton player

Tang Xianhu 汤仙虎
Personal information
- Nickname: The Thing
- Born: Thing Hian Hou 汤现虎; 13 March 1942 (age 84) Lampung, Dutch East Indies

Sport
- Country: China
- Sport: Badminton
- Handedness: Right
- Event: Men's singles, Men's doubles & Mixed doubles
Medal record
Men's badminton
Representing China
Asian Games
Gold medal – first place	1978 Bangkok	Mixed doubles
Gold medal – first place	1974 Tehran	Men's team
Silver medal – second place	1978 Bangkok	Men's doubles
Silver medal – second place	1978 Bangkok	Men's team
Bronze medal – third place	1974 Tehran	Men's doubles
Bronze medal – third place	1974 Tehran	Mixed doubles

Tang Xianhu (Chinese: 汤仙虎; pinyin: Tāng Xiānhǔ; Indonesian: Fuad Nurhadi; born 13 March 1942) is an Indonesia-born Chinese former badminton player and coach. In the early days of his career, Tang was unable to participate in international competitions due to political factors, but he defeated the world's top players many times during overseas visits and exchanges, and was known as the "Uncrowned King" in badminton. He won the Asian Games men's team gold in 1974 and mixed doubles gold in 1978. After retiring, he started coaching in China and Indonesia. Many of the players he coached had won the World Championships and/or Olympic gold medals such as Lin Ying, Wu Dixi, Li Lingwei, Han Aiping, Ji Xinpeng, Xia Xuanze, Sun Jun, Lin Dan, Cai Yun, Fu Haifeng, Alan Budikusuma and Hendrawan. In 2002, he was inducted into the Badminton Hall of Fame.

== Early life ==
Tang was born of Chinese descent in Kotabumi, Lampung Province, Dutch East Indies, on 13 March 1942. He is the third of four children in the family. He started playing badminton with his family when he was eight years old. Due to his father's work, he had to move to Bandar Lampung and then Jakarta when he was growing up. He continued to play badminton and became one of Indonesia's top junior players in the 1950s. He was later recommended to Wang Wenjiao who was recruiting members for the Fujian badminton team in China at the time. Due to the outbreak of the anti-Chinese movement in Indonesia, Tang then decided to go to China in 1961 after his partner and rival, Hou Jiachang from Surabaya, to continue his studies while playing badminton.

== Career ==
=== As Athlete ===
As the People's Republic of China had not yet joined the United Nations in the 1960s. The International Badminton Federation (IBF) only recognises the membership of the Chinese Taipei Badminton Association, so Tang and others cannot represent China in international competitions.

In 1963, China and Indonesia joined some countries to hold the Games of the New Emerging Forces (GANEFO) in Jakarta and Tang was able to participate in the international competition for the first time and won the men's singles and the men's team gold medals. In 1965, Tang visited Denmark with the Chinese badminton team and played friendly matches with the Danish team. He defeated Erland Kops, then the reigning All England men's singles champion easily with the score of 15–5, 15–0. The Chinese also defeated several of the most powerful countries in the world of badminton at that time, in both Asia and Europe, but because they could not officially participate in international competitions, fans called the Chinese representatives as the "Uncrowned King" of badminton. In 1966, Tang won three titles, men's team, men's doubles and men's singles at the Asian Games of the New Emerging Forces in Cambodia.

In 1974, the Chinese Badminton Association officially became a member of the Asian Badminton Federation. Representing China, Tang won the men's team gold medal and the men's doubles and mixed doubles bronze medals in the 7th Asian Games badminton competition held in the same year. From 1963 to 1975, Tang was known to be undefeated in international competitions. In 1978, in addition to winning the men's team and men's doubles silver medals at the 8th Asian Games, Tang also won the mixed doubles gold medal with Zhang Ailing.

In 1979, Tang retired from competitive badminton at the age of 37 because of his old age, lack of physical capacity as well as already had successors in place.

=== As Coach ===
In 1981, Tang returned to the national team as the women's team coach. During this period, he trained Lin Ying and Wu Dixi, who had won the women's doubles at the World Championships and the World Cup several times. He also led the women's team to win the 1984 and 1986 Uber Cup, as well as the 1986 Asian Games women's team event.

In 1986, Tang went back to Indonesia to take care of his aging parents. He started coaching at Club Pelita Jaya before being hired as the head coach of the Indonesian national team in 1988. There, he trained many future stars, such as Alan Budikusuma, Hermawan Susanto and Hendrawan. Fung Permadi, who moved to the Chinese Tapei in the 1990s and runner-up to China's Sun Jun at the 1999 IBF World Championships, was also trained by Tang.

After Tang's application for Indonesian citizenship was not dealt with properly, he returned to China in 1997. He first returned to Fujian as the head coach of the Fujian Provincial Team. At the end of 1998, the head coach of the Chinese national team, Li Yongbo, called Tang and invited him to return to the national team to coach the men's singles in preparation for the 2000 Sydney Olympics. There he trained Dong Jiong, Sun Jun, Ji Xinpeng, Xia Xuanze, Chen Hong and others. In 2000, Ji Xinpeng, not herald before the competition, managed to beat Indonesia's Taufik Hidayat, Denmark's Peter Gade and another Indonesian player Hendrawan to win China's first ever badminton Olympic men's singles gold.

In 2002, Tang switched to coaching the men's doubles after poor performances from the doubles players at the Thomas Cup competition held in May. There, he groomed Cai Yun and Fu Haifeng to prepare for their successful 2004 Thomas Cup campaign. The Chinese duo later went on to win three consecutive World Championships titles. In 2007, Tang started coaching Lin Dan and accompanied Lin through his stunning gold medal streak at the 2008 Olympic Games in Beijing, the 2009 World Championships in Hyderabad and the 2010 Asian Games in Guangzhou.

In 2012, the 70-year-old Tang returned to help the Chinese team prepare for the London Olympics after taking a short hiatus from the sport due to health problems. China will go on to win all the gold medals on offer by sweeping all five disciplines.

== Personal life ==
Tang was born when the Japanese army occupied Indonesia, hence his parents named him "现虎", which means "tiger of today" and placed fearless expectations on him. After he went to China, he changed his name to "仙虎", which means "immortal tiger" and hopes to get some immortal energy from it.

Tang had a marriage before going to Indonesia to coach. His second wife, Lu Qing, was once a trainee of the Chinese national badminton team under Tang, who was still coaching in China at the time. After Tang went to Indonesia, Lu first went to Australia to study before going to Indonesia to marry Tang. They have a son, Songhua, and a daughter, Yunhua.

In 1988, a book authored by Tang, with regards to badminton techniques and training,《羽毛球运动技术图解》, was published by the People's Sports Publishing House of China.

Tang's father died in 1996, and he returned to Fujian, China with his mother, wife and children the following year.

== Honours and awards ==
Tang was awarded the IBF Distinguished Service Award in 1986 and was inducted into the IBF Hall of Fame in 2002.

== Achievements ==
=== Asian Games ===
Men's doubles
Year	Venue	Partner	Opponent	Score	Result
1974	Amjadieh Sport Complex, Tehran, Iran	(China) Chen Tianxiang	(Japan) Shoichi Toganoo (Japan) Nobutaka Ikeda	15–2, 15–3	Bronze
1978	Bangkok, Thailand	(China) Lin Shiquan	(Indonesia) Christian Hadinata (Indonesia) Ade Chandra	8–15, 10–15	Silver

Mixed doubles
Year	Venue	Partner	Opponent	Score	Result
1974	Amjadieh Sport Complex, Tehran, Iran	(China) Chen Yuniang	(Thailand) Sakuntaniyom Pornchai (Thailand) Kingmanee Thongkam	15–12, 15–9	Bronze
1978	Bangkok, Thailand	(China) Zhang Ailing	(Indonesia) Hariamanto Kartono (Indonesia) Theresia Widiastuti	15–8, 17–16	Gold

=== Invitational tournament ===
Men's singles
Year	Tournament	Opponent	Score	Result
1976	Asian Invitational Championships	(China) Luan Jin	15–5, 15–2	Bronze

Men's doubles
Year	Tournament	Partner	Opponent	Score	Result
1976	Asian Invitational Championships	(China) Luan Jin	(Indonesia) Ade Chandra (Indonesia) Christian Hadinata	8–15, 10–15	Silver
1978	World Invitational Championships	(China) Lin Shiquan	(China) Hou Jiachang (China) Yu Yaodong	15–7, 15–1	Gold
1978	Asian Invitational Championships	(China) Lin Shiquan	(India) Syed Modi (India) Prakash Padukone	15–3, 15–5	Gold
