= Hou Jiachang =

Chinese badminton player

Hou Jiachang 侯加昌
Personal information
- Born: Houw Ka-Tjong; August 1942 (age 84) Semarang, Dutch East Indies

Sport
- Country: China
- Sport: Badminton
- Handedness: Right
- Retired: 1979
Medal record
Men's badminton
Representing China
World Championships
Gold medal – first place	1978 Bangkok	Men's doubles
Asian Games
Gold medal – first place	1974 Tehran	Men's singles
Gold medal – first place	1974 Tehran	Men's team
Silver medal – second place	1978 Bangkok	Men's team
Bronze medal – third place	1978 Bangkok	Men's doubles
Asian Championships
Gold medal – first place	1976 Hyderabad	Men's singles
Silver medal – second place	1976 Hyderabad	Men's team

Hou Jiachang (Chinese: 侯加昌; pinyin: Hóu Jiāchāng; born August 1942) is a Chinese former badminton player, born in Dutch East Indies.

== Early life ==
Hou was introduced to the sport of Badminton by his father when he was 8 years old. After high school in Semarang, Hou went to China in 1960 for further studies at Guangzhou Sport University.

== Playing career ==
It 1960, he joined the Guangdong provincial team. It was the time of Cultural Revolution in China and he rarely had any chance of competing in foreign tournaments. His first appearance at the International level came at GANEFO in 1963 where he won Men's doubles championship with Tang Xianhu and a silver medal at the singles event. In 1965, Chinese team visited Denmark and outlasted the top Danish players such as Erland Kops. In 1966, the Chinese whitewashed the Danish team 4–0 in front of 5,000 spectators in Beijing. In that friendly match, Hou partnered Fu Hanxun and won in straight games 15–6, 15–4 against Svend Pri and Per Walsøe.

In 1972, Hou became a member of CCP and joined the National Badminton Team. He participated at the First King Mahendra Memorial International Friendship which took place in Nepalese capital of Kathmandu, where he won singles as well doubles titles. In 1973, Hou along with his team went to England and dominated the English players, winning all the disciplines except Mixed doubles. Meeting the Danish players again in a friendly encounter in 1973, Chinese team won 10–0, where Hou defeated Svend Pri. He also defeated Punch Gunalan in a tie with Malaysia in Kuala Lumpur.

It was only in 1974 when IBF allowed Chinese players to compete in Asian Games held in Tehran. He emerged champion in Singles event, where he defeated his compatriot Fang Kaixiang and helped his team in winning the team event gold medal against Indonesia. At the age of 34, in 1976, Hou won the Asian Championship, defeating Liem Swie King in the final. He was crowned the Men's doubles World Champions in 1978 where he partnered Yu Yaodong and beat Thai pair in the final. He was felicitated with trophy by then Vice-Premier of China Deng Xiaoping after the match.

== Coaching career ==
Hou retired in 1979 and was the head coach of the Chinese team until 1993. A three-time national champion, he is credited with 15 World Championship titles as well as 4 Thomas Cup conquests. He also coached United States' players in 1994.

== Playing style ==
As described by Eddy Choong, Hou had an uncanny sense of anticipation plus a wide variety of strokes. He played less of a power game and his defence is impenetrable, very solid.

== Awards ==
In 1986, the International Badminton Federation honoured Hou Jiachang with the IBF Distinguished Service Award. Hou was inducted into the International Badminton Federation (IBF, currently BWF) Hall of Fame in 2002.

== Achievements ==
=== World Championships ===
Men's doubles
Year	Venue	Partner	Opponent	Score	Result
1978	Bangkok, Thailand	(China) Yu Yaodong	(Thailand) Sawei Chanseorasmee (Thailand) Sarit Pisudchaikul	18–15, 15–12	Gold

=== Asian Games ===
Men's singles
Year	Venue	Opponent	Score	Result
1974	Amjadieh Sport Complex, Tehran, Iran	(China) Fang Kaixiang	15–12, 15–11	Gold

Men's doubles
Year	Venue	Partner	Opponent	Score	Result
1978	Bangkok, Thailand	(China) Yu Yaodong	(Indonesia) Ade Chandra (Indonesia) Christian Hadinata	14–17, 7–15	Bronze

=== Asian Championships ===
Men's singles
Year	Venue	Opponent	Score	Result
1976	Lal Bahadur Shastri Stadium, Hyderabad; India	(Indonesia) Liem Swie King	17–16, 15–9	Gold

=== Invitational Tournament ===
Men's singles
Year	Tournament	Opponent	Score	Result
1976	Asian Invitational Championships	(Indonesia) Iie Sumirat	15–12, 8–15, 15–18	Silver

Men's doubles
Year	Tournament	Partner	Opponent	Score	Result
1978	World Invitational Championships	(China) Yu Yaodong	(China) Lin Shiquan (China) Tang Xianhu	7–15, 1–15	Silver

== Book ==
- 侯加昌 (2008). 摯愛-侯加昌回憶錄 (in Simplified Chinese). Beijing: China International Publishing Group. ISBN 9787802225893.
