= 1984 All England Open Badminton Championships =

1984 All England Championships
Tournament details
- Dates: 21 March 1984– 25 March 1984
- Edition: 74th
- Venue: Wembley Arena
- Location: London

The 1984 Yonex All England Open Championships was the 74th edition held in 1984, at Wembley Arena, London.

== Final results ==
| Category | Winners | Runners-up | Score |
|---|---|---|---|
| Men's singles | (Denmark) Morten Frost | (Indonesia) Liem Swie King | 9–15, 15–10, 15–10 |
| Women's singles | (China) Li Lingwei | (China) Han Aiping | 11–5, 11–8 |
| Men's doubles | (Indonesia) Rudy Heryanto & Hariamanto Kartono | (England) Mike Tredgett & Martin Dew | 15–11, 15–6 |
| Women's doubles | (China) Lin Ying & Wu Dixi | (South Korea) Kim Yun-ja & Yoo Sang-hee | 15–8, 8–15, 17–14 |
| Mixed doubles | (England) Martin Dew & Gillian Gilks | (England) Nigel Tier & Gillian Gowers | 15–8, 15–3 |

== Men's singles ==
=== Seeds ===
1. (Denmark) Morten Frost
2. (China) Luan Jin
3. (China) Han Jian
4. (Indonesia) Liem Swie King
5. (China) Yang Yang
6. (India) Prakash Padukone
7. (Indonesia) Icuk Sugiarto
8. (Indonesia) Hastomo Arbi

=== Section 1 ===
Round of 32
(Denmark) Morten Frost | 15 | 15
(England) Andy Goode | 1 | 8
(China) Chen Changjie | 15 | 5 | 15
(Malaysia) Razif Sidek | 5 | 15 | 8
(Indonesia) Hastomo Arbi | 15 | 15
(South Korea) Park Joo Bong | 9 | 12
(England) Kevin Jolly | 15 | 15
(Denmark) Kim Brodersen | 9 | 10
(China) Han Jian | 15 | 18
(South Korea) Sung Han-kook | 9 | 13
(Denmark) Jens Peter Nierhoff | 15 | 15
(Sweden) Ulf Johansson | 4 | 11
(India) Prakash Padukone | 15 | 15
(Denmark) Torben Carlsen | 4 | 7
(England) Dipak Tailor | 5 | 15 | 15
(Japan) Hiroshi Nishiyama | 15 | 10 | 7

Round of 16
(Denmark) Frost | 15 | 15
(China) Changjie | 7 | 4
(Indonesia) Arbi | 15 | 9 | 15
(England) Jolly | 7 | 15 | 2
(China) Han Jian | 7 | 15 | 17
(Denmark) Nierhoff | 15 | 5 | 16
(India) Padukone | 15 | 15
(England) Tailor | 1 | 7

Quarter-finals
(Denmark) Frost | 14 | 15 | 15
(Indonesia) Arbi | 17 | 5 | 8
(China) Han Jian | 17 | 15
(India) Padukone | 14 | 10

Semi-finals
(Denmark) Frost | w/o
(China) Han Jian | scr

=== Section 2 ===
Round of 32
(Indonesia) Liem Swie King | 15 | 15
(South Korea) Lee Deuk-choon | 3 | 0
(Malaysia) Misbun Sidek | 15 | 15
(Sweden) Stefan Karlsson | 11 | 7
(China) Yang Yang | 11 | 15 | 15
(England) Stephen Butler | 15 | 11 | 5
(Indonesia) Eddy Hartono | 15 | 15
(Denmark) Ib Frederiksen | 5 | 9
(Denmark) Michael Kjeldsen | 15 | 15
(India) Syed Modi | 8 | 2
(Indonesia) Icuk Sugiarto | 15 | 15
(England) Glen Milton | 5 | 5
(England) Nick Yates | 15 | 5 | 15
(China) Luan Jin | 9 | 15 | 11
(Indonesia) Sigit Pamungkas | 15 | 15
(Japan) Shokichi Miyamori | 6 | 2

Round of 16
(Indonesia) Swie King | 15 | 15
(Malaysia) Sidek | 3 | 7
(China) Yang Yang | 15 | 15
(Indonesia) Hartono | 10 | 7
(Denmark) Kjeldsen | 1 | 15 | 15
(Indonesia) Sugiarto | 15 | 8 | 12
(England) Yates | 15 | 15
(Indonesia) Pamungkas | 3 | 2

Quarter-finals
(Indonesia) Swie King | 15 | 15
(China) Yang Yang | 10 | 8
(Denmark) Kjeldsen | 15 | 17
(England) Yates | 4 | 15

Semi-finals
(Indonesia) Swie King | 15 | 15
(Denmark) Kjeldsen | 5 | 1

== Women's singles ==
=== Seeds ===
1. (China) Li Lingweyu
2. (China) Han Aiping
3. (China) Zhang Ailing
4. (China) Qian Ping
5. (Indonesia) Ivana Lie
6. (South Korea) Kim Yun-ja
7. (Denmark) Kirsten Larsen
8. (England) Helen Troke

=== Section 1 ===
Round of 32
(China) Li Lingwei | 11 | 11
(Canada) Linda Cloutier | 5 | 2
(South Korea) Yoo Sang-hee | 11 | 11
(England) Wendy Massam | 3 | 0
(England) Helen Troke | 11 | 11
(Denmark) Agnethe Juul | 3 | 8
(Japan) Saori Kohmoto | 7 | 11 | 11
(Indonesia) Elizabeth Latief | 11 | 2 | 4
(China) Qian Ping | 7 | 11 | 11
(England) Gillian Clark | 11 | 3 | 7
(Sweden) Christine Magnusson | 11 | 11
(Indonesia) Raith Kumala-Dewi | 5 | 4
(South Korea) Kim Yun-ja | 11 | 11
(Scotland) Pamela Hamilton | 0 | 1
(England) Karen Beckman | 11 | 11
(England) Sue Louis | 4 | 2

Round of 16
(China) Lingwei | 11 | 12
(South Korea) Yoo Sang-hee | 5 | 9
(England) Troke | 8 | 11 | 11
(Japan) Kohmoto | 11 | 1 | 8
(China) Ping | 5 | 11 | 11
(Sweden) Magnussen | 11 | 5 | 2
(South Korea) Kim Yun-ja | 11 | 11 | 11
(England) Beckman | 12 | 3 | 0

Quarter-finals
(China) Lingwei | 12 | 11
(England) Troke | 10 | 8
(China) Ping | 11 | 11
(South Korea) Kim Yun-ja | 8 | 3

Semi-finals
(China) Lingwei | 11 | 11
(China) Ping | 3 | 8

=== Section 2 ===
Round of 32
(China) Han Aiping | 11 | 11
(Indonesia) Merry Herliem | 5 | 1
(England) Sally Podger | 11 | 11
(Japan) Fumiko Tohkairin | 3 | 3
(Denmark) Kirsten Larsen | 11 | 10 | 11
(South Korea) Kim Yoon Sook | 8 | 12 | 2
(England) Gillian Gowers | 11 | 12
(Indonesia) Rosiana Tendean | 2 | 10
(China) Zhang Ailing | 11 | 11
(South Korea) Kim Bok Sun | 6 | 3
(Denmark) Charlotte Hattens | 12 | 11
(England) Alison Fisher | 11 | 8
(Japan) Sumiko Kitada | 11 | 11
(Denmark) Dorthe Lynge | 4 | 4
(Indonesia) Ivana Lie | 9 | 11 | 11
(England) Jane Webster | 12 | 7 | 4

Round of 16
(China) Aiping | 11 | 11
(England) Podger | 4 | 4
(Denmark) Larsen | 11 | 11
(England) Gowers | 8 | 8
(China) Ailing | 11 | 11
(Denmark) Hattens | 1 | 2
(Japan) Kitada | 11 | 11
(Indonesia) Ivana | 4 | 2

Quarter-finals
(China) Aiping | 11 | 11
(Denmark) Larsen | 7 | 4
(China) Ailing | 11 | 11
(Japan) Kitada | 8 | 3

Semi-finals
(China) Aiping | 11 | 11
(China) Ailing | 6 | 2
