= 1988 All England Open Badminton Championships =

1988 All England Championships
Tournament details
- Dates: 16 March 1988– 20 March 1988
- Edition: 78th
- Venue: Wembley Arena
- Location: London

The 1988 Yonex All England Open Championships was the 78th edition held in 1988, at Wembley Arena, London. In the men's singles Ib Frederiksen became the first unseeded player to win an All England singles title since the seeding system was introduced.

== Final results ==
Category	Winners	Runners-up	Score
Men's singles	(Denmark) Ib Frederiksen	(Denmark) Morten Frost	8–15, 15–7, 15–10
Women's singles	(China) Gu Jiaming	(South Korea) Lee Young-suk	11–2, 11–2
Men's doubles	(China) Li Yongbo & Tian Bingyi	(Malaysia) Jalani Sidek & Razif Sidek	15–6, 15–7
Women's doubles	(South Korea) Chung So-young & Kim Yun-ja	(South Korea) Chung Myung-hee & Hwang Hye-young	15–8, 9–15, Ret.
Mixed doubles	(China) Wang Pengren & Shi Fangjing	(Denmark) Jesper Knudsen & Nettie Nielsen	15–9, 18–13

== Men's singles ==
=== Seeds ===
1. (Denmark) Morten Frost
2. (China) Zhao Jianhua
3. (Indonesia) Eddy Kurniawan
4. (China) Zhang Qingwu
5. (England) Darren Hall

=== Section 1 ===
Round of 32
(Denmark) Ib Frederiksen	15	15
(Malaysia) Chong Weng Kai	5	9
(Netherlands) Pierre Pelupessy	10	15	15
(Denmark) Claus Overbeck	15	9	3
(Denmark) Michael Kjeldsen	15	15
(Indonesia) Lius Pongoh	7	3
(Malaysia) Foo Kok Keong	15	15
(Denmark) Peter Lund	8	12
(Denmark) Jens Peter Nierhoff	7	15	15
(Indonesia) Ardy Wiranata	15	8	4
(Australia) Sze Yu	15	15
(Sweden) Jorgen Tuvesson	11	5
(South Korea) Park Sung-bae	15	15
(Malaysia) Razif Sidek	5	4
(China) Zhao Jianhua	15	15
(Japan) Shuji Matsuno	12	3

Round of 16
(Denmark) Frederiksen	15	15
(Netherlands) Palupessy	9	9
(Denmark) Kjeldsen	18	10	15
(Malaysia) Foo	14	15	9
(Denmark) Nierhoff	15	15
(Australia) Sze Yu	6	7
(South Korea) Sung-bae	15	15
(China) Jianhua	12	8

Quarter-finals
(Denmark) Frederiksen	15	15
(Denmark) Kjeldsen	5	5
(Denmark) Nierhoff	15	15
(South Korea) Sing-bae	9	1

Semi-finals
(Denmark) Frederiksen	15	15
(Denmark) Nierhoff	10	11

=== Section 2 ===
Round of 32
(Denmark) Morten Frost	15	15
(Malaysia) Kwan Yoke Meng	4	1
(Sweden) Pär-Gunnar Jönsson	14	15	15
(Denmark) Thomas Kirkegaard	17	11	10
(England) Darren Hall	12	15	15
(South Korea) Sung Han-kook	15	11	4
(India) Vimal Kumar	18	15
(Sweden) Peter Axelsson	13	7
(Indonesia) Eddy Kurniawan	6	15	15
(Canada) Mike Butler	15	2	8
(Denmark) Jans Andersen	15	15
(West Germany) Harald Klauer	11	3
(England) Nick Yates	9	15	15
(India) Prakash Padukone	15	7	8
(China) Zhang Qingwu	15	15
(Japan) Hiroki Etoh	5	3

Round of 16
(Denmark) Frost	15	15
(Sweden) Jönsson	7	4
(England) Hall	15	15
(India) Kumar	11	11
(Indonesia) Kurniawan	10	15	15
(Denmark) Andersen	15	3	8
(England) Yates	15	15
(China) Qingwu	6	10

Quarter-finals
(Denmark) Frost	17	15
(England) Hall	15	4
(Indonesia) Kurniawan	15	15
(England) Yates	4	10

Semi-finals
(Denmark) Frost	15	18
(Indonesia) Kurniawan	4	13

== Women's singles ==
=== Seeds ===
1. (China) Han Aiping
2. (South Korea) Hwang Hye-young
3. (Denmark) Kirsten Larsen
4. (China) Zheng Yuli
5. (Japan) Sumiko Kitada
6. (China) Qian Ping
7. (China) Gu Jiaming
8. (South Korea) Lee Young-suk

=== Section 1 ===
Round of 32
(China) Gu Jiaming	11	11
(Japan) Hideyo Noguchi	9	2
(Sweden) Christine Magnusson	11	12
(England) Sue Louis	4	9
(England) Helen Troke	11	8	11
(South Korea) Hwang Hye-young	3	11	8
(Indonesia) Susi Susanti	11	11
(Netherlands) Eline Coene	4	9
(China) Zheng Yuli	11	11
(Netherlands) Monique Hoogland	1	6
(Denmark) Christina Bostofte
(Japan) Sumiko Kitada
(South Korea) Gillian Gowers	9	11	11
(Soviet Union) irina Rozhkova	11	6	5

Round of 16
(China) Jiaming	11	11
(Sweden) Magnusson	4	3
(England) Troke	1	11	12
(Indonesia) Susanti	11	1	11
(China) Yuli	11	11
(Denmark) Bostofte	5	4
(Japan) Kitada	11	11
(England) Gowers	5	5

Quarter-finals
(China) Jiaming	11	12
(England) Troke	4	10
(China) Yuli	1	11	11
(Japan) Kitada	11	7	5

Semi-finals
(China) Jiaming	11	11
(China) Yuli	5	4

=== Section 2 ===
Round of 32
(South Korea) Lee Young-suk	11	11	11
(England) Sara Halsall	12	8	2
(Denmark) Charlotte Hattens	11	6	12
(Indonesia) Kho Mei Hwa	4	11	10
(China) Han Aiping	11	11
(Netherlands) Erica van Dijck	3	7
(Japan) Yooko Koizumi	10	11	11
(Japan) Hisako Takamine	12	7	5
(Denmark) Kirsten Larsen	11	11
(England) Fiona Elliott	4	6
(Japan) Kimiko Jinnai	11	11
(Scotland) Jennifer Allen	4	2
(China) Qian Ping	11	11
(Canada) Denyse Julien	3	7
(England) Julie Munday	11	11
(Japan) Kuniko Kitamoto	8	3

Round of 16
(South Korea) Young-suk	11	11
(Denmark) Hattens	5	7
(China) Aiping	11	11
(Japan) Koizumi	1	3
(Denmark) Larsen	11	11
(Japan) Jinnai	5	8
(China) Ping	11	11
(England) Munday	2	0

Quarter-finals
(South Korea) Young-suk	11	0	11
(China) Aiping	6	11	6
(Denmark) Larsen	11	11
(China) Ping	5	3

Semi-finals
(South Korea) Young-suk	11	11
(Denmark) Larsen	3	3
