= 1985 All England Open Badminton Championships =

1985 All England Championships
Tournament details
- Dates: 20 March 1985– 24 March 1985
- Edition: 75th
- Venue: Wembley Arena
- Location: London

The 1985 Yonex All England Open Championships was the 75th edition held in 1985, at Wembley Arena, London.

== Final results ==
Category	Winners	Runners-up	Score
Men's singles	(China) Zhao Jianhua	(Denmark) Morten Frost	6–15, 15–10, 18–15
Women's singles	(China) Han Aiping	(China) Li Lingwei	11–7, 12–10
Men's doubles	(South Korea) Kim Moon-soo & Park Joo-bong	(Denmark) Mark Christiansen & Michael Kjeldsen	7-15, 15–10, 15–9
Women's doubles	(China) Li Lingwei & Han Aiping	(China) Lin Ying & Wu Dixi	15–7, 15–12
Mixed doubles	(Scotland) Billy Gilliland & (England) Nora Perry	(Sweden) Thomas Kihlström & (England) Gillian Clark	15–10, 15–12

== Men's singles ==
=== Seeds ===
1. (Denmark) Morten Frost
2. (China) Zhao Jianhua
3. (Indonesia) Liem Swie King
4. (China) Han Jian
5. (Denmark) Ib Frederiksen
6. (China) Yang Yang
7. (England) Steve Baddeley
8. (India) Prakash Padukone

=== Section 1 ===
Round of 32
(Denmark) Morten Frost	15	15
(India) Vimal Kumar	2	3
(Malaysia) Ong Beng Teong	15	15
(Canada) Mike Butler	10	8
(India) Prakash Padukone	7	15	15
(China) Xiong Guobao	15	10	7
(Indonesia) Icuk Sugiarto	15	15
(England) Gary Scott	0	9
(China) Han Jian	15	15
(England) Joe Ford	13	0
(England) Darren Hall	15	8	15
(Australia) Sze Yu	5	15	12
(Denmark) Ib Frederiksen	15	15
(Denmark) Morten Svarrer	7	9
(Taiwan) Chang Wen Sung	15	15
(South Korea) Kwak Chan Ho	11	8

Round of 16
(Denmark) Frost	15	15
(Malaysia) Teong	6	6
(India) Padukone	15	15
(Indonesia) Sugiarto	5	9
(China) Han Jian	15	15
(England) Hall	7	2
(Denmark) Frederiksen	15	15
(Taiwan) Sung	3	10

Quarter finals
(Denmark) Frost	15	15
(India) Padukone	5	6
(China) Han Jian	17	15
(Denmark) Frederiksen	12	5

Semi finals
(Denmark) Frost	15	15
(China) Han Jian	5	10

=== Section 2 ===
Round of 32
(China) Zhao Jianhua	15	15
(Thailand) Sompol Kukasemkij	8	5
(Indonesia) Hastomo Arbi	15	15
(Denmark) Torben Carlsen	10	3
(England) Steve Baddeley	15	15
(Sweden) Jan-Eric Antonsson	3	3
(Malaysia) Misbun Sidek	15	15
(Japan) Hiroshi Nishiyama	11	11
(Indonesia) Liem Swie King	15	15
(Japan) Hiroyuki Hasegawa	6	0
(Denmark) Michael Kjeldsen	15	12	15
(Sweden) Göran Carlsson	8	15	10
(China) Yang Yang	15	18
(South Korea) Sung Han Kook	11	16
(England) Stephen Butler	15	18
(Japan) Shokichi Miyamori	8	15

Round of 16
(China) Jianhua	15	4	15
(Indonesia) Arbi	7	15	6
(England) Baddeley	15	15
(Malaysia) Sidek	9	6
(Indonesia) Swie King	17	15
(Denmark) Kjeldsen	16	13
(China) Yang Yang	15	15
(England) Butler	6	13

Quarter finals
(China) Jianhua	15	15
(England) Baddeley	10	5
(Indonesia) Swie King	11	15	15
(China) Yang Yang	15	11	3

Semi finals
(China) Jianhua	15	15
(Indonesia) Swie King	10	5

== Women's singles ==
=== Seeds ===
1. (China) Li Lingwei
2. (China) Han Aiping
3. (China) Wu Jianqiu
4. (China) Zheng Yuli
5. (South Korea) Kim Yun-ja
6. (England) Helen Troke
7. (China) Qian Ping
8. (Denmark) Kirsten Larsen

=== Section 1 ===
Round of 32
(China) Li Lingwei	11	11
(Taiwan) Sherry Liu	8	1
(Canada) Denyse Julien	11	11
(Japan) Michiko Tomita	2	2
(Denmark) Kirsten Larsen	11	11
(Netherlands) Astrid van der Knaap	2	2
(South Korea) Chung So-young	8	12	11
(England) Karen Beckman	11	9	6
(China) Zheng Yuli	11	11
(England) Sara Halsall	5	0
(Japan) Sumiko Kitada	1	11	11
(England) Fiona Elliott	11	5	2
(South Korea) Kim Yun-ja	11	11
(Sweden) Maria Bengtsson	4	0
(China) Guan Weizhen	11	11
(England) Gillian Clark	0	2

Round of 16
(China) Lingwei	11	11
(Canada) Julien	3	7
(Denmark) Larsen	11	4	11
(South Korea) Young	7	11	5
(China) Zheng Yuli	11	11
(Japan) Kitada	5	6
(South Korea) Kim Yun-ja	11	11
(China) Weizhen	1	9

Quarter finals
(China) Lingwei	11	11
(Denmark) Larsen	3	2
(China) Zheng Yuli	11	11
(South Korea) Kim Yun-ja	8	5

Semi finals
(China) Lingwei	11	11
(China) Zheng Yuli	3	3

=== Section 2 ===
Round of 32
(China) Han Aiping	11	11
(Denmark) Dorte Kjær	5	7
(South Korea) Hwang Hye-young	11	12
(Taiwan) Lin Hui Hsu	3	10
(China) Qian Ping	11	11
(Japan) Yoshiko Yonekura	3	0
(England) Barbara Sutton	9	12	11
(Canada) Claire Backhouse	12	9	8
(China) Wu Jianqiu	11	11
(Japan) Mariko Imagawa	5	2
(South Korea) Hwang Sun-ai	9	11	11
(India) Ami Ghia	11	3	1
(England) Helen Troke	11	8	11
(England) Sally Podger	1	11	8
(Netherlands) Eline Coene	11	11
(Sweden) Christine Magnusson	2	5

Round of 16
(China) Aiping	11	11
(South Korea) Young	5	0
(China) Qian Ping	11	11
(England) Sutton	0	5
(China) Jianqiu	11	12
(South Korea) Sun-ai	1	11
(England) Troke	11	11
(Netherlands) Coene	3	6

Quarter finals
(China) Aiping	11	11
(China) Qian Ping	6	4
(China) Jianqiu	11	11
(England) Troke	7	6

Semi finals
(China) Aiping	11	11
(China) Jianqiu	6	5

== Men's doubles ==
Semifinals
(South Korea) Kim Moon-soo (South Korea) Park Joo-bong	15	15
(Indonesia) Hariamanto Kartono (Indonesia) Rudy Heryanto	9	3
(Denmark) Mark Christensen (Denmark) Michael Kjeldsen	15	18	18
(England) Steve Baddeley (England) Martin Dew	18	14	13

Final
(South Korea) Kim Moon-soo (South Korea) Park Joo-bong	7	15	15
(Denmark) Mark Christensen (Denmark) Michael Kjeldsen	15	10	9

== Women's doubles ==
Semifinals
(China) Lin Ying (China) Wu Dixi	wo	wo
(China) Guan Weizhen (China) Wu Jianqui
(China) Li Lingwei (China) Han Aiping	15	15
(South Korea) Kim Yun-ja (South Korea) Sang Hee-yoo	5	9

Final
(China) Lin Ying (China) Wu Dixi	7	12
(China) Li Lingwei (China) Han Aiping	15	15

== Mixed doubles ==
Semifinals
(England) Martin Dew (England) Gillian Gilks	15	14	10
(Sweden) Thomas Kihlström (England) Gillian Clark	3	17	15
(England) Nigel Tier (England) Gillian Gowers	4	17	14
(Scotland) Billy Gilliland (England) Nora Perry	15	16	17

Final
(Sweden) Thomas Kihlström (England) Gillian Clark	10	12
(Scotland) Billy Gilliland (England) Nora Perry	15	15
