= 1983 IBF World Championships – Women's singles =

Badminton championships

Women's singles at the 1983 IBF World Championships
- Venue: Brøndbyhallen
- Location: Copenhagen, Denmark
- Dates: May 2, 1983 – May 8, 1983

Medalists
gold medal	Li Lingwei	China
silver medal	Han Aiping	China
bronze medal	Helen Troke	England
bronze medal	Zhang Ailing	China

The 1983 IBF World Championships (World Badminton Championships) were held in Copenhagen, Denmark, in 1983. Following the results of the women's singles.

== Main stage ==
=== Section 1 ===
First round
(China) Li Lingwei
(Canada) Johanne Falardeau
(South Korea) Chung Myung-hee	11	12
(Peru) Ximena Bellido	3	10
(Switzerland) Eliane Huldi
(England) Jane Webster	6	11	11
(Japan) Fumiko Tookairin	11	3	8
(Netherlands) Joke van Beusekom	11	11
(Iceland) Kristin Magnusdottir	2	0
(Denmark) Nettie Nielsen	11	11
(Germany) Eva-Maria Zwiebler	2	0
(Scotland) Pamela Hamilton	12	11
(Chinese Taipei) Sherry Liu	10	8

Second round
(China) Li Lingwei	11	11
(Canada) Johanne Falardeau	6	3
(South Korea) Chung Myung-hee	11	11
(Switzerland) Eliane Huldi	0	0
(England) Jane Webster	11	11
(Netherlands) Joke van Beusekom	2	5
(Denmark) Nettie Nielsen	11	12
(Scotland) Pamela Hamilton	5	11

Third round
(China) Li Lingwei	11	11
(South Korea) Chung Myung-hee	5	2
(England) Jane Webster	11	11	11
(Denmark) Nettie Nielsen	12	7	3

Quarterfinals
(China) Li Lingwei	11	11
(England) Jane Webster	6	5

=== Section 2 ===
First round
(England) Helen Troke	11	11
(Canada) Denyse Julien	2	6
(Netherlands) Marjan Ridder	11	12
(Germany) Mechtild Hagemann	5	10
(Japan) Yoshiko Yonekura	11	11
(Iceland) Kristin Kristiansdottir	1	1
(Australia) Audrey Swaby	5	11	12
(Poland) Bożena Wojtkowska	11	1	9
(South Korea) Kim Bok-sun	11	11
(Sweden) Carina Andersson	0	9
(India) Radhika Bose
(Denmark) Kirsten Larsen
(China) Zheng Yuli

Second round
(England) Helen Troke	11	11
(Netherlands) Marjan Ridder	0	1
(Japan) Yoshiko Yonekura	11	11
(Australia) Audrey Swaby	5	3
(South Korea) Kim Bok-sun	11	11
(India) Radhika Bose	5	4
(Denmark) Kirsten Larsen	11	5	11
(China) Zheng Yuli	5	11	5

Third round
(England) Helen Troke	11	11
(Japan) Yoshiko Yonekura	1	6
(South Korea) Kim Bok-sun	11	12
(Denmark) Kirsten Larsen	8	11

Quarterfinals
(England) Helen Troke	12	11
(South Korea) Kim Bok-sun	9	2

=== Section 3 ===
First round
(China) Han Aiping
(Wales) Sian Williams
(Sweden) Christine Magnusson	11	11
(Australia) Julie McDonald	2	4
(Iceland) Þórdís Edwald
(South Korea) Kim Yun-ja	11	11
(Netherlands) Eline Coene	1	1
(Denmark) Lene Køppen	11	11
(Canada) Claire Backhouse	1	5
(England) Karen Beckman	6	12	11
(Indonesia) Elizabeth Latief	11	10	3
(Japan) Sumiko Kitada	11	11
(Switzerland) Silvia Lüthi	0	1

Second round
(China) Han Aiping	11	11
(Wales) Sian Williams	1	4
(Sweden) Christine Magnusson	11	11
(Iceland) Þórdís Edwald	5	1
(South Korea) Kim Yun-ja	3	11	11
(Denmark) Lene Køppen	11	5	7
(England) Karen Beckman	11	11
(Japan) Sumiko Kitada	6	3

Third round
(China) Han Aiping	11	11
(Sweden) Christine Magnusson	3	5
(South Korea) Kim Yun-ja	11	6	11
(England) Karen Beckman	4	11	7

Quarterfinals
(China) Han Aiping	10	11	12
(South Korea) Kim Yun-ja	12	3	10

=== Section 4 ===
First round
(China) Zhang Ailing
(Japan) Shigemi Kawamura
(Denmark) Pia Nielsen	11	11
(Peru) Carmen Bellido	0	1
(Switzerland) Liselotte Blumer
(England) Sally Podger	11	11
(Netherlands) Karin van the Valk	4	0
(Sweden) Maria Bengtsson	11	11
(New Zealand) Toni Whittaker	4	2
(India) Ami Ghia	11	11
(Canada) Linda Cloutier	6	4
(South Korea) Hwang Sun-ai	11	12
(Germany) Kirsten Schmieder	6	11

Second round
(China) Zhang Ailing	11	12
(Japan) Shigemi Kawamura	1	9
(Denmark) Pia Nielsen	11	11
(Switzerland) Liselotte Blumer	6	3
(England) Sally Podger	11	11
(Sweden) Maria Bengtsson	3	4
(India) Ami Ghia	6	11	11
(South Korea) Hwang Sun-ai	11	5	8

Third round
(China) Zhang Ailing	9	11	11
(Denmark) Pia Nielsen	12	4	2
(England) Sally Podger	11	11
(India) Ami Ghia	8	2

Quarterfinals
(China) Zhang Ailing	11	11
(England) Sally Podger	2	4

== Final stage ==
Quarterfinals
1	(China) Li Lingwei	11	11
8	(England) Jane Webster	6	5
4	(England) Helen Troke	12	11
5	(South Korea) Kim Bok Sun	9	2
3	(China) Han Aiping	10	11	12
6	(South Korea) Kim Yun-ja	12	3	10
2	(China) Zhang Ailing	11	11
7	(England) Sally Podger	2	4

Semifinals
(China) Li Lingwei	12	11
(England) Helen Troke	10	6
(China) Han Aiping	11	11
(China) Zhang Ailing	7	7

Finals
(China) Li Lingwei	11	6	11
(China) Han Aiping	8	11	7
