= 1987 All England Open Badminton Championships =

1987 All England Championships
Tournament details
- Dates: 11 March 1987– 15 March 1987
- Edition: 77th
- Venue: Wembley Arena
- Location: London

The 1987 Yonex All England Open Championships was the 77th edition held in 1987, at Wembley Arena, London.

== Final results ==
Category	Winners	Runners-up	Score
Men's singles	(Denmark) Morten Frost	(Indonesia) Icuk Sugiarto	15–10, 15–0
Women's singles	(Denmark) Kirsten Larsen	(China) Qian Ping	9–7 Ret
Men's doubles	(China) Li Yongbo & Tian Bingyi	(Indonesia) Bobby Ertanto & Rudy Heryanto	15-9, 15-8
Women's doubles	(South Korea) Chung Myung-hee & Hwang Hye-young	(China) Lin Ying & Guan Weizhen	15-6, 8-15, 15-11
Mixed doubles	(South Korea) Lee Deuk-choon & Chung Myung-hee	(Sweden) Jan-Eric Antonsson & Christine Magnusson	15–5, 14–18, 15–8

== Men's singles ==
=== Seeds ===
1. (Denmark) Morten Frost
2. (Indonesia) Icuk Sugiarto
3. (Malaysia) Misbun Sidek
4. (England) Steve Baddeley
5. (Malaysia) Foo Kok Keong
6. (Australia) Sze Yu
7. (South Korea) Park Joo-Bong

=== Section 1 ===
Round of 32
(Denmark) Morten Frost	15	15
(England) Mike Adams	5	0
(Sweden) Pär-Gunnar Jönsson	8	15	15
(England) Steve Butler	15	7	8
(England) Darren Hall	15	15
(South Korea) Park Joo-Bong	10	6
(Denmark) Jens Peter Nierhoff	15	15
(Malaysia) Razif Sidek	6	7
(Indonesia) Eddy Kurniawan	15	15
(India) Syed Modi	12	7
(China) Yang Yang	15	15
(Denmark) Poul-Erik Høyer Larsen	9	9
(Malaysia) Foo Kok Keong	15	15
(England) Nick Yates	12	7
(South Korea) Park Sung-bae	15	15
(Wales) Chris Rees	6	0

Round of 16
(Denmark) Frost	15	15
(Sweden) Jönsson	0	6
(England) Hall	15	15
(Denmark) Nierhoff	10	10
(Indonesia) Kurniawan	7	15	15
(China) Yang Yang	15	6	10
(Malaysia) Keong	15	15
(South Korea) Sung-bae	11	12

Quarter-finals
(Denmark) Frost	15	15
(England) Hall	6	3
(Indonesia) Kurniawan	18	8	15
(Malaysia) Keong	17	15	13

Semi-finals
(Denmark) Frost
(Indonesia) Kurniawan

=== Section 2 ===
Round of 32
(Indonesia) Icuk Sugiarto	18	15
(South Korea) Kwak Chan-ho	13	13
(Japan) Shuji Matsuno	15	15
(China) Han Jian	12	10
(Australia) Sze Yu	15	15
(India) Vimal Kumar	7	4
(Malaysia) Chong Weng Kai	15	17
(Indonesia) Richard Mainaky	4	14
(South Korea) Steve Baddeley	15	15
(Indonesia) Sakrapee Thongsari	10	5
(Denmark) Kim Brodersen	8	15
(South Korea) Sung Han Kook	15	11
(Indonesia) Hermawan Susanto	15	15
(Japan) Hiroshi Nishiyama	11	3
(Malaysia) Misbun Sidek	15	15
(Denmark) Ib Frederiksen	6	10

Round of 16
(Indonesia) Sugiarto	15	15
(Japan) Matsuno	1	4
(Australia) Sze Yu	15	12	15
(Malaysia) Weng Kai	10	15	10
(England) Baddeley	15	15
(Denmark) Brodersen	12	4
(Indonesia) Susanto	18	15
(Malaysia) Sidek	17	9

Quarter-finals
(Indonesia) Sugiarto	2	15	15
(Australia) Sze Yu	15	8	7
(England) Baddeley	15	15
(Indonesia) Susanto	6	11

Semi-finals
(Indonesia) Sugiarto	15	15
(England) Baddeley	13	7

== Women's singles ==
=== Seeds ===
1. (China) Li Lingwei
2. (Japan) Sumiko Kitada
3. (China) Qian Ping
4. (Denmark) Kirsten Larsen
5. (England) Fiona Elliott
6. (South Korea) Kim Yun-ja
7. (Indonesia) Elizabeth Latief

=== Section 1 ===
Round of 32
(Denmark) Kirsten Larsen	11	11
(Netherlands) Monique Hoogland	1	3
(West Germany) Katrin Schmidt	4	11	11
(South Korea) Kim Ho-ja	11	9	7
(England) Fiona Elliott	11	11
(Sweden) Maria Henning	5	2
(Thailand) Darunee Lertvoralak	11	11
(Sweden) Charlotta Wihlborg	4	2
(China) Li Lingwei	11	11
(Sweden) A Sandersson	4	2
(Denmark) Charlotte Hattens	4	11	11
(Netherlands) Erica van Dijck	11	3	5
(Japan) Kimiko Jinnai	11	11
(Denmark) A Laurser	4	2
(South Korea) Lee Young-suk	11	11
(Japan) Yooko Koizumi	5	8

Round of 16
(Denmark) Larsen	11	11
(West Germany) Schmidt	6	2
(England) Elliott	12	11
(Thailand) Lertvoralak	9	4
(China) Lingwei	11	11
(Denmark) Hattens	2	3
(Japan) Jinnai	11	12
(South Korea) Young-suk	8	11

Quarter-finals
(Denmark) Larsen	11	11
(England) Elliott	1	3
(China) Lingwei	11	11
(Japan) Jinnai	4	3

Semi-finals
(Denmark) Larsen	11	5	11
(China) Lingwei	5	11	4

=== Section 2 ===
Round of 32
(China) Qian Ping	11	11
(England) Suzanne Louis	6	1
(Netherlands) Astrid van der Knaap	11	12
(Sweden) Pernille Nedergaard	6	10
(South Korea) Kim Yun-ja	w/o
(Denmark) Helle Anderson	scr
(England) Gillian Gowers	4	11	11
(Hong Kong) Amy Chan	11	3	2
(Japan) Sumiko Kitada	11	11
(South Korea) Chun Sung-suk	4	4
(Denmark) Christina Bostofte	11	11
(Sweden) Maria Bengtsson	2	1
(Sweden) Christine Magnusson	11	11
(Netherlands) Eline Coene	5	2
(Indonesia) Elizabeth Latief	12	11
(England) Alison Fisher	2	2

Round of 16
(China) Qian Ping	11	11
(Netherlands) van der Knapp	1	1
(South Korea) Yun-Ja	11	11
(England) Gowers	4	4
(Japan) Kitada	12	11
(Denmark) Bostofte	9	1
(Sweden) Magnusson	11	2	11
(Indonesia) Latief	7	11	3

Quarter-finals
(China) Qian Ping	11	11
(South Korea) Yun-ja	2	3
(Japan) Kitada	6	11	11
(Sweden) Magnusson	11	5	2

Semi-finals
(China) Qian Ping	11	11
(Japan) Kitada	6	7
