= 1986 All England Open Badminton Championships =

1986 All England Championships
Tournament details
- Dates: 12 March 1986– 16 March 1986
- Edition: 76th
- Venue: Wembley Arena
- Location: London

The 1986 Yonex All England Open Championships was the 76th edition held in 1986, at Wembley Arena, London.

== Final results ==
Category	Winners	Runners-up	Score
Men's singles	(Denmark) Morten Frost	(Malaysia) Misbun Sidek	15:2, 15:8
Women's singles	(South Korea) Kim Yun-ja	(China) Qian Ping	11:6, 12:11
Men's doubles	(South Korea) Kim Moon-soo & Park Joo-bong	(Malaysia) Jalani Sidek & Razif Sidek	15:2, 15:11
Women's doubles	(South Korea) Chung Myung-hee & Hwang Hye-young	(South Korea) Kim Yun-ja & Yoo Sang-hee	15:5, 6:15, 15:8
Mixed doubles	(South Korea) Park Joo-bong & Chung Myung-hee	(South Korea) Lee Deuk-choon & Chung So-young	15:5, 15:5

== Men's singles ==
=== Seeds ===
1. (Denmark) Morten Frost
2. (Australia) Sze Yu - withdrew injured
3. (Denmark) Ib Frederiksen
4. (India) Prakash Padukone
5. (Denmark) Torben Carlsen - eliminated in round one
6. (Malaysia) Misbun Sidek
7. (Denmark) Michael Kjeldsen - eliminated in round one
8. (England) Steve Baddeley

=== Section 1 ===
Round of 32
(Denmark) Morten Frost	15	15
(England) Glen Milton	10	11
(Indonesia) Eddy Ismanto	15	18
(Austria) Klaus Fischer	11	15
(England) Steve Baddeley	15	15
(Denmark) Morten Svarrer	2	7
(Indonesia) Ardy B. Wiranata	15	15
(South Korea) Park Sung-bae	5	9
(India) Prakash Padukone	15	15
(England) Darren Hall	8	9
(South Korea) Choi Byung-hak	15	15
(Japan) Hiroshi Nishiyama	13	5
(China) Li Mao	15	15
(Denmark) Kim Brodersen	7	9
(Denmark) Poul-Erik Høyer Larsen	8	18	15
(Indonesia) Alan Budikusuma	15	17	13

Round of 16
(Denmark) Frost	15	15
(Indonesia) Ismanto	5	8
(England) Baddeley	11	15	10
(Indonesia) Wiranata	15	15
(India) Padukone	15	15
(South Korea) Byung-Hak	3	6
(China) Li Mao	15	15
(Denmark) Høyer Larsen	8	9

Quarter-finals
(Denmark) Frost	15	15
(England) Baddeley	6	9
(India) Padukone	15	15
(China) Li Mao	2	5

Semi-finals
(Denmark) Frost	15	15
(India) Padukone	3	2

=== Section 2 ===
Round of 32
(Malaysia) Misbun Sidek	15	15
(Denmark) Claus Thomsen	8	5
(Indonesia) Hermawan Susanto	15	15
(England) Chris Dobson	12	11
(Denmark) Ib Frederiksen	15	15
(England) Matthew Smith	6	4
(England) Nick Yates	15	15
(Netherlands) Pierre Pelupessy	8	0
(South Korea) Sung Han-kook	15	15
(England) Steve Butler	7	13
(Japan) Shinji Matsuura	6	12	15
(Indonesia) Richard Mainaky	15	5	10
(Malaysia) Chong Weng Kai	15	10	15
(Wales) Chris Rees	11	15	12
(Denmark) Nils Skelby	17	18
(Denmark) Claus Overbeck	16	15

Round of 16
(Malaysia) Sidek	15	15
(Indonesia) Susanto	12	7
(Denmark) Frederiksen	12	15	15
(England) Yates	15	5	8
(South Korea) Sung	15	15
(Japan) Matsuura	12	2
(Malaysia) Weng Kai	10	15	15
(Denmark) Skelby	15	0	5

Quarter-finals
(Malaysia) Sidek	15	15	15
(Denmark) Frederiksen	18	7	6
(South Korea) Sung	15	15
(Malaysia) Weng Kai	8	3

Semi-finals
(Malaysia) Sidek	18	15
(South Korea) Sung	16	4

== Women's singles ==
=== Seeds ===
1. (Denmark) Kirsten Larsen
2. (China) Qian Ping
3. (England) Helen Troke
4. (South Korea) Kim Yun-ja
5. (China) Shang Fumei
6. (China) Gu Jiaming
7. (Sweden) Christine Magnusson
8. (Japan) Sumiko Kitada

=== Section 1 ===
Round of 32
(South Korea) Kim Yun-ja	11	11
(Sweden) Maria Bengtsson	5	6
(England) Fiona Elliott	11	11
(India) Madhumita Bisht	0	5
(China) Shang Fumei	11	11
(Canada) Denyse Julien	2	3
(Denmark) Lisbet Stuer-Lauridsen
(Japan) Harumi Kohara
(Japan) Sumiko Kitada	11	11
(Canada) Suneeta Khare	2	8
(Denmark) Rikke von Sørensen	11	11
(England) Karen Beckman	3	2
(Denmark) Kirsten Larsen	11	12
(Netherlands) Astrid van der Knaap	8	10
(England) Alison Fisher	11	11
(Canada) Linda Cloutier	7	6

Round of 16
(South Korea) Yun-ja
(England) Elliott
(China) Fumei	13	11
(Denmark) Stuer-Lauridsen	10	3
(Japan) Kitada	11	11
(Denmark) Sørensen	1	4
(Denmark) Larsen	11	11
(England) Fisher	1	3

Quarter-finals
(South Korea) Yun-ja	11	11
(China) Fumei	7	5
(Japan) Kitada	11	11
(Denmark) Larsen	7	5

Semi-finals
(South Korea) Yun-ja	11	12
(Japan) Kitada	4	10

=== Section 2 ===
Round of 32
(China) Qian Ping	11	11
(England) Gillian Gowers	4	0
(South Korea) Chung So-young	11	8	12
(Canada) Claire Backhouse	2	11	11
(Sweden) Christine Magnusson	11	11
(England) Gillian Clark	4	7
(South Korea) Hwang Hye-young	11	11
(Japan) Hisako Takamine	1	2
(China) Gu Jiaming	11	11
(England) Sara Halsall	5	1
(South Korea) Yoo Sang-hee	11	11
(Netherlands) Erica van Dijck	5	2
(England) Helen Troke	11	11
(Canada) Claire Allison	10	1
(Japan) Kimiko Jinnai	12	11
(Denmark) Christina Bostofte	9	6

Round of 16
(China) Qian Ping	11	6	11
(South Korea) So-young	4	11	4
(Sweden) Magnsusson	2	12	11
(South Korea) Hye-young	11	10	7
(China) Gu Jiaming
(South Korea) Sang-hee
(England) Troke	11	11
(Japan) Jinnai	3	6

Quarter-finals
(China) Qian Ping	11	11
(Sweden) Magnusson	5	4
(China) Gu Jiaming	11	11
(England) Troke	7	7

Semi-finals
(China) Qian Ping	11	11
(China) Gu Jiaming	4	7
