= 1985 IBF World Championships – Women's singles =

Badminton championships

Women's singles at the 1985 IBF World Championships
- Venue: Olympic Saddledome
- Location: Calgary, Canada
- Dates: June 10, 1985 – June 16, 1985

Medalists
gold medal	Han Aiping	China
silver medal	Wu Jianqui	China
bronze medal	Li Lingwei	China
bronze medal	Zheng Yuli	China

The 1985 IBF World Championships (World Badminton Championships) were held in Calgary, Canada, from June 10 to June 16, 1985. Following the results of the women's singles.

== Main stage ==
=== Section 1 ===
First round
(China) Han Aiping
bye
(Germany) Heidi Krickhaus	8	12	11
(Mexico) Jian Ping He	11	9	5
(Trinidad and Tobago) Beena Narwani	w.o.
(Zambia) Josephine Chipepo
(Sweden) Maria Bengtsson	11	11
(Peru) Ximena Bellido	1	3
(Japan) Sumiko Kitada	11	11
(South Korea) Chung Yoon Chung	5	1
(Canada) Linda Cloutier	11	11
(Nigeria) Bridget Ibenero	3	0
(Netherlands) Erica van Dijck	11	11
(United States) Barbara McKinley	0	5
(India) Hufrish Nariman
(Scotland) Gillian Martin	w.o.

Second round
(China) Han Aiping	11	11
(Germany) Heidi Krickhaus	2	2
(Trinidad and Tobago) Beena Narwani
(Sweden) Maria Bengtsson	w.o.
(Japan) Sumiko Kitada	11	11
(Canada) Linda Cloutier	3	4
(Netherlands) Erica van Dijck	5	7
(Scotland) Gillian Martin	11	11

Third round
(China) Han Aiping	11	11
(Sweden) Maria Bengtsson	4	2
(Japan) Sumiko Kitada	11	11
(Scotland) Gillian Martin	6	1

Quarterfinals
(China) Han Aiping	11	11
(Japan) Sumiko Kitada	4	1

=== Section 2 ===
First round
(China) Zheng Yuli	11	11
(Chinese Taipei) Sherry Liu	2	8
(Canada) Sandra Skillings	w.o.
(Nigeria) Grace Edward
(Thailand) Jutatip Banjongsilp	8	11	11
(Peru) Gloria Jimenez	11	9	4
(Hong Kong) Amy Chan	11	11
(United States) Dawn Race	0	2
(South Korea) Kim Bok-sun	11	11
(Mozambique) Indira Bhikha	0	0
(England) Gillian Clark	11	11
(Australia) Maxine Evans	5	7
(India) Madhumita Bisht	3	11	12
(Scotland) Aileen Nairn	11	3	10
(New Zealand) Toni Whittaker	0	2
(Japan) Mariko Imagawa	11	11

Second round
(China) Zheng Yuli	11	11
(Canada) Sandra Skillings	2	2
(Thailand) Jutatip Banjongsilp	11	3	11
(Hong Kong) Amy Chan	4	11	5
(South Korea) Kim Bok-sun	12	11
(England) Gillian Clark	10	7
(India) Madhumita Bisht	11	11
(Japan) Mariko Imagawa	6	2

Third round
(China) Zheng Yuli	11	11
(Thailand) Jutatip Banjongsilp	4	0
(South Korea) Kim Bok-sun	11	11
(Japan) Mariko Imagawa	3	4

Quarterfinals
(China) Zheng Yuli	11	11
(South Korea) Kim Bok-sun	4	8

=== Section 3 ===
First round
(Australia) Julie McDonald
(Trinidad and Tobago) Debra O'Connor	w.o.
(Japan) Kimiko Jinnai	11	11
(Chinese Taipei) Lee Chien-Mei	6	7
(Netherlands) Eline Coene	11	11
(India) Ami Ghia	5	7
(England) Helen Troke	11	11
(South Korea) Chung So-young	6	7
(Peru) Teresa Montero	1	11	11
(France) Anne Meniane	11	6	4
(United States) Linda French	11	11
(Nigeria) A. Onuoha	2	2
(Canada) Denyse Julien	11	11
(Mexico) Maria de la Paz Luna	2	5
bye
(China) Wu Jianqiu

Second round
(Australia) Julie McDonald	7	1
(Japan) Kimiko Jinnai	11	11
(Netherlands) Eline Coene	7	5
(England) Helen Troke	11	11
(Peru) Teresa Montero	11	11
(United States) Linda French	4	3
(Canada) Denyse Julien	5	3
(China) Wu Jianqiu	11	11

Third round
(Japan) Kimiko Jinnai	7	9
(England) Helen Troke	11	12
(Peru) Teresa Montero	4	1
(China) Wu Jianqiu	11	11

Quarterfinals
(England) Helen Troke	0	4
(China) Wu Jianqiu	11	11

=== Section 4 ===
First round
(Canada) Claire Backhouse
(Zambia) Mary Mukangwa	w.o.
(Sweden) Christine Magnusson	11	11
(Iceland) Thordis Edwald	0	1
(England) Gillian Gowers	w.o.
(Nigeria) Dayo Oyewusi
(Denmark) Kirsten Larsen	11	11
(Thailand) Darunee Lertvoralak	7	2
(South Korea) Hwang Hye-young	2	11	11
(Scotland) Pamela Hamilton	11	7	3
(Peru) Silvia Jimenez	11	11
(United States) Monica Pontow	4	1
(Japan) Mishiyo Nishimura	11	11
(India) Deepti Thanekar	3	4
bye
(China) Li Lingwei

Second round
(Canada) Claire Backhouse	5	3
(Sweden) Christine Magnusson	11	11
(England) Gillian Gowers	9	11	3
(Denmark) Kirsten Larsen	12	4	11
(South Korea) Hwang Hye-young	11	11
(Peru) Silvia Jimenez	0	0
(Japan) Mishiyo Nishimura	3	2
(China) Li Lingwei	11	11

Third round
(Sweden) Christine Magnusson	11	4	11
(Denmark) Kirsten Larsen	4	11	4
(South Korea) Hwang Hye-young	5	11
(China) Li Lingwei	11	12

Quarterfinals
(Sweden) Christine Magnusson	6	8
(China) Li Lingwei	11	11

== Final stage ==
Quarterfinals
(China) Han Aiping	11	11
(Japan) Sumiko Kitada	4	1
(China) Zheng Yuli	11	11
(South Korea) Kim Bok Sun	4	8
(England) Helen Troke	11	11
(China) Wu Jianqiu	0	4
(Sweden) Christine Magnusson	6	8
(China) Li Lingwei	11	11

Semifinals
(China) Han Aiping	3	11	11
(China) Zheng Yuli	11	3	2
(China) Wu Jianqiu	11	12
(China) Li Lingwei	7	9

Finals
(China) Han Aiping	6	12	11
(China) Wu Jianqiu	11	11	2
