= 1987 IBF World Championships – Women's singles =

Badminton championships

Women's singles at the 1987 IBF World Championships
- Venue: Capital Indoor Stadium
- Location: Beijing, China
- Dates: May 18, 1987 – May 24, 1987

Medalists
gold medal	Han Aiping	China
silver medal	Li Lingwei	China
bronze medal	Zheng Yuli	China
bronze medal	Gu Jiaming	China

The 1987 IBF World Championships (World Badminton Championships) were held in Beijing, China, in 1987. Following the results of the women's singles.

== Main stage ==
=== Section 1 ===
First round
(China) Han Aiping	11	11
(Indonesia) Sarwendah Kusumawardhani	4	3
(Sweden) Charlotte Wihlborg	12	11
(Canada) Gillian Calder	10	7
(France) Rosita Rios	w.o.
(Nigeria) Obiageli Edoga
(Japan) Yoko Kuizumi	11	11
(India) Madhumita Bisht	4	8
(China) Tang Jiuhong	11	11
(Hong Kong) Chan Lim Chee	0	8
(Soviet Union) Irina Rozhkova	11	11
(Netherlands) Monique Hoogland	2	5
(South Korea) Chun Sung Suk	w.o.
(Denmark) Christina Bostofte
(United States) Linda Safarik	11	11
(Peru) Ximena Bellido	4	8

Second round
(China) Han Aiping	15	15
(Sweden) Charlotte Wihlborg	5	2
(France) Rosita Rios	2	1
(Japan) Yoko Kuizumi	11	11
(China) Tang Jiuhong	11	11
(Soviet Union) Irina Rozhkova	4	1
(South Korea) Chun Sung Suk	11	11
(United States) Linda Safarik	1	3

Third round
(China) Han Aiping	11	11
(Japan) Yoko Kuizumi	2	6
(China) Tang Jiuhong	11	11
(South Korea) Chun Sung Suk	4	2

Quarterfinals
(China) Han Aiping	11	11
(China) Tang Jiuhong	8	9

=== Section 2 ===
First round
(China) Gu Jiaming	11	11
(New Zealand) Katrin Lockey	1	1
(South Korea) Nah Kyung Ah	11	11
(United States) Mary Fran Hughes	3	6
(Japan) Kimiko Jinnai	11	11
(Netherlands) Astrid van der Knaap	2	4
(Canada) Rhonda Cator	1	11	12
(Scotland) Jennifer Allen	11	7	11
(Indonesia) Susi Susanti	11	11
(Canada) Doris Piché	4	2
(Iceland) Thordis Edwald	11	4	11
(United States) Linda French	0	11	7
(South Korea) Lee Heung Soon	3	11	11
(England) Fiona Elliott	11	2	8
(Denmark) Kirsten Larsen	11	11
(Peru) Maria Montero	1	1

Second round
(China) Gu Jiaming	11	11
(South Korea) Nah Kyung Ah	6	1
(Japan) Kimiko Jinnai	11	11
(Canada) Rhonda Cator	2	2
(Indonesia) Susi Susanti	11	11
(Iceland) Thordis Edwald	4	2
(South Korea) Lee Heung Soon	8	3
(Denmark) Kirsten Larsen	11	11

Third round
(China) Gu Jiaming	11	12
(Japan) Kimiko Jinnai	6	10
(Indonesia) Susi Susanti	2	11	12
(Denmark) Kirsten Larsen	11	8	10

Quarterfinals
(China) Gu Jiaming	11	12
(Indonesia) Susi Susanti	8	10

=== Section 3 ===
First round
(China) Li Lingwei	w.o.
(Nigeria) Dayo Oyewusi
(Soviet Union) Viktoria Pron	11	11
2	5
(Netherlands) Eline Coene	11	11
(England) Sara Halsall	8	9
(Canada) Linda Cloutier	11	11
(United States) Meilin Okuno	2	5
(China) Shi Wen	11	11
(Japan) Elizabeth Latief	1	4
(Japan) Kumiko Kitamoto	11	11
(United States) Nina Lolk	0	0
(Sweden) Christine Magnusson	11	11
(Hong Kong) Mui Tong Chon	1	4
(South Korea) Kim Ho Ja	12	12
(Denmark) Charlotte Hattens	11	10

Second round
(China) Li Lingwei	11	11
(Soviet Union) Viktoria Pron	4	1
(Netherlands) Eline Coene	11	11
(Canada) Linda Cloutier	5	0
(China) Shi Wen	11	11
(Japan) Kumiko Kitamoto	7	2
(Sweden) Christine Magnusson	11	11
(South Korea) Kim Ho Ja	12	6	5

Third round
(China) Li Lingwei	11	12
(Netherlands) Eline Coene	6	10
(China) Shi Wen	11	8	12
(Sweden) Christine Magnusson	8	11	10

Quarterfinals
(China) Li Lingwei	11	11	11
(China) Shi Wen	12	6	8

=== Section 4 ===
First round
(China) Zheng Yuli	11	11
(South Korea) Claire Allison	4	1
(Sweden) Maria Henning
5	8
(Netherlands) Erica van Dijck	11	11
(Soviet Union) Vlada Beljutina	2	5
(India) Ami Ghia	11	11
(Germany) Katrin Schmidt	6	5
(South Korea) Lee Young Suk	11	11
(Scotland) Elinor Allen	4	3
(France) Elothe Mansuy	1	1
(New Zealand) Toni Whittaker	11	11
(Japan) Sumiko Kitada	w.o.
(Mexico) He Jianping	4	2
(Canada) Chantal Jobin	11	11
(Canada) Joy Kitzmiller	2	3

Second round
(China) Zheng Yuli	11	11
(Sweden) Maria Henning	2	3
(Netherlands) Erica van Dijck	12	11
(India) Ami Ghia	9	2
(South Korea) Lee Young Suk	11	10	11
(New Zealand) Toni Whittaker	4	12	1
(Japan) Sumiko Kitada	11	11
(Canada) Chantal Jobin	4	1

Third round
(China) Zheng Yuli	1	1
(Netherlands) Erica van Dijck	6	1
(South Korea) Lee Young Suk	11	11
(Japan) Sumiko Kitada	6	4

Quarterfinals
(China) Zheng Yuli	11	11
(South Korea) Lee Young Suk	6	4

== Final stage ==
Quarterfinals
1	(China) Han Aiping	11	11
8	(China) Tang Jiuhong	8	9
4	(China) Gu Jiaming	11	12
5	(Indonesia) Susi Susanti	8	10
3	(China) Li Lingwei	11	11	11
6	(China) Shi Wen	12	6	8
2	(China) Zheng Yuli	11	11
7	(South Korea) Lee Young-suk	6	4

Semifinals
(China) Han Aiping	11	11
(China) Gu Jiaming	4	0
(China) Li Lingwei	11	8	11
(China) Zheng Yuli	6	11	5

Finals
(China) Han Aiping	10	11	11
(China) Li Lingwei	12	4	7
