= 1987 Singapore Open =

Unofficial individual 1987 Asian Badminton Championships

Tournament details
- Dates: 18 February 1987– 22 February 1987
- Edition: 41st
- Total prize money: US$31,000
- Venue: Singapore Badminton Hall
- Location: Geylang, Singapore

Champions
- Men's singles: (Malaysia) Misbun Sidek
- Women's singles: (Indonesia) Elizabeth Latief
- Men's doubles: (Indonesia) Bobby Ertanto (Indonesia) Liem Swee King
- Women's doubles: (South Korea) Chung Myung-hee (South Korea) Hwang Hye-young

The 1987 Singapore Open, also known as the Konica Cup - The Invitational Asian Badminton Championships, took place from 18 ~ 22 February 1987 at the Singapore Badminton Hall in Singapore. It was the first edition of this event. The total prize money on offer was US$31,000.

== Medalists ==
Discipline	Gold	Silver	Bronze
Men's singles	(Malaysia) Misbun Sidek	(Indonesia) Eddy Kurniawan	(Malaysia) Foo Kok Keong
Women's singles	(Indonesia) Elizabeth Latief	(China) Gu Jiaming	(China) Han Aiping
Men's doubles	(Indonesia) Bobby Ertanto (Indonesia) Liem Swie King	(Indonesia) Hadibowo (Indonesia) Rudy Heryanto	(China) Chen Kang (China) Ding Qiqing
Women's doubles	(South Korea) Hwang Hye-young (South Korea) Chung Myung-hee	(Indonesia) Ivana Lie (Indonesia) Rosiana Tendean	(Indonesia) Verawaty Fadjrin (Indonesia) Yanti Kusmiati

== Final results ==
Category	Winners	Runners-up	Score
Men's singles	(Malaysia) Misbun Sidek	(Indonesia) Eddy Kurniawan	15–13, 15–8
Women's singles	(Indonesia) Elizabeth Latief	(China) Gu Jiaming	1–11, 11–6, 11–6
Men's doubles	(Indonesia) Liem Swie King & Bobby Ertanto	(Indonesia) Hadibowo & Rudy Heryanto	15–2, 15–4
Women's doubles	(South Korea) Hwang Hye-young & Chung Myung-hee	(Indonesia) Rosiana Tendean & Ivanna Lie	15–5, 15–4

== Bronze medal matches ==
Category	Bronze medalists	Fourth place	Score
Men's singles	(Malaysia) Foo Kok Keong	(Indonesia) Joko Suprianto	15–10, 12–15, 15–9
Women's singles	(China) Han Aiping	(China) Zheng Yuli	Walkover
Men's doubles	(China) Chen Kang & Ding Qiqing	(South Korea) Lee Deuk-choon & Kim Moon-soo	15–2, 15–3
Women's doubles	(Indonesia) Verawaty Fadjrin & Yanti Kusmiati	(China) Han Aiping & Lai Caiqin	15–12, 15–9

== See also ==
- 1987 Asian Badminton Championships
