= Badminton at the 1986 Asian Games – Women's singles =

Women's singles at the 1986 Asian Games
- Venue: Olympic Gymnastics Arena
- Dates: 30 September – 4 October
- Competitors: 18 from 9 nations

Medalists
gold medal	Han Aiping	China
silver medal	Li Lingwei	China
bronze medal	Hwang Hye-young	South Korea
bronze medal	Kim Yun-ja	South Korea

The badminton women's singles tournament at the 1986 Asian Games in Seoul took place from 30 September to 4 October.

== Schedule ==
All times are Korea Standard Time (UTC+09:00)

Date	Time	Event
30 September	11:00	First round
30 September	11:00	Second round
1 October	11:00	Second round
2 October	11:00	Quarter-finals
3 October	11:00	Semi-finals
4 October	11:00	Final

== Results ==
=== Finals ===
Semi-finals
1	Li Lingwei (CHN)	11	11
5/8	Hwang Hye-young (KOR)	6	7
3/4	Kim Yun-ja (KOR)	7	9
2	Han Aiping (CHN)	11	12

Final
1	Li Lingwei (CHN)	6	9
2	Han Aiping (CHN)	11	11

=== Top half ===
==== Section 1 ====
First round

Second round
1	Li LW (CHN)	11	11
K Rana (NEP)	1	1
5/8	E Latief (INA)	11	11
A Chan (HKG)	7	5

Quarter-finals
1	Li LW (CHN)	11	11
5/8	E Latief (INA)	7	3

==== Section 2 ====
First round
M Bisht (IND)	11	11
L Mulasartsatorn (THA)	7	4

Second round
3/4	S Kitada (JPN)	11	11
T Shah (PAK)	0	0
5/8	Hwang H-y (KOR)	11	11
M Bisht (IND)	4	1

Quarter-finals
3/4	S Kitada (JPN)	5	5
5/8	Hwang H-y (KOR)	11	11

=== Bottom half ===
==== Section 3 ====
First round
C Shrestha (NEP)	5	1
Tong C M (HKG)	11	11

Second round
Tong C M (HKG)	2	6
5/8	A Ghia (IND)	11	11
G Wadood (PAK)	1	0
3/4	Kim Y-j (KOR)	11	11

Quarter-finals
5/8	A Ghia (IND)	7	5
3/4	Kim Y-j (KOR)	11	11

==== Section 4 ====
First round

Second round
D Lertvoralak (THA)	1	1
5/8	K Jinnai (JPN)	11	11
S Kusumawardhani (INA)	1	2
2	Han AP (CHN)	11	11

Quarter-finals
5/8	K Jinnai (JPN)	2	5
2	Han AP (CHN)	11	11
