= Badminton at the 1986 Asian Games – Women's team =

Women's team at the 1986 Asian Games
- Venue: Olympic Gymnastics Arena
- Dates: 27–29 September
- Competitors: 37 from 6 nations

Medalists
gold medal	China; Gu Jiaming, Guan Weizhen, Han Aiping, Li Lingwei, Lin Ying, Qian Ping, Wu Jianqiu, Zheng Yuli
silver medal	Japan; Kimiko Jinnai, Sumiko Kitada, Harumi Kohara, Hisako Takamine, Atsuko Tokuda, Yoshiko Yonekura
bronze medal	South Korea; Chung Myung-hee, Chung So-young, Hwang Hye-young, Kang Haeng-suk, Kim Ho-ja, Kim Yun-ja, Lee Myung-hee, Yoo Sang-hee
bronze medal	Indonesia; Verawaty Fadjrin, Sarwendah Kusumawardhani, Elizabeth Latief, Ivana Lie, Rosiana Tendean, Imelda Wiguna

The badminton women's team tournament at the 1986 Asian Games in Seoul took place from 27 September to 29 September.

== Schedule ==
All times are Korea Standard Time (UTC+09:00)

Date	Time	Event
27 September	11:00	Quarter-finals
28 September	18:00	Semi-finals
29 September	18:00	Final

== Results ==
Quarterfinals		Semifinals			Final
		1	China	4
South Korea	5		South Korea	1
Nepal	0				1	China	5
India	1					Japan	0
Japan	4		Japan	3
		2	Indonesia	2

=== Quarterfinals ===
27 September	South Korea	5–0	Nepal

Kim Yun-ja	2–0	Kalpana Rana	11–0, 11–1
Hwang Hye-young	2–0	Chhanya Shrestha	11–0, 11–0
Kim Yun-ja / Yoo Sang-hee	2–0	Kalpana Rana / Chhanya Shrestha	15–0, 15–0
Chung Myung-hee / Hwang Hye-young	2–0	Rajani Joshi / Reema Shrestha	15–1, 15–1
Yoo Sang-hee	2–0	Rajani Joshi	11–0, 11–0

27 September	India	1–4	Japan

Seema Bhandari	0–2	Sumiko Kitada	2–11, 0–11
Ami Ghia	0–2	Kimiko Jinnai	1–11, 0–11
Hufrish Nariman / Mallika Barua	0–2	Atsuko Tokuda / Yoshiko Yonekura	1–15, 0–15
Ami Ghia / Madhumita Bisht	0–2	Sumiko Kitada / Harumi Kohara	8–15, 4–15
Madhumita Bisht	2–0	Yoshiko Yonekura	11–8, 11–6

=== Semifinals ===
28 September	China	4–1	South Korea

Li Lingwei	2–1	Hwang Hye-young	11–7, 6–11, 11–9
Han Aiping	2–0	Kim Yun-ja	11–4, 11–5
Lin Ying / Guan Weizhen	0–2	Chung Myung-hee / Hwang Hye-young	13–15, 9–15
Li Lingwei / Han Aiping	2–1	Kim Yun-ja / Yoo Sang-hee	9–15, 15–8, 18–17
Zheng Yuli	2–0	Yoo Sang-hee	Walkover

28 September	Japan	3–2	Indonesia

Sumiko Kitada	2–0	Sarwendah Kusumawardhani	11–9, 11–2
Kimiko Jinnai	1–2	Elizabeth Latief	5–11, 11–5, 3–11
Atsuko Tokuda / Yoshiko Yonekura	1–2	Verawaty Fadjrin / Ivana Lie	15–10, 6–15, 13–18
Sumiko Kitada / Kimiko Jinnai	2–1	Imelda Wiguna / Rosiana Tendean	15–8, 6–15, 17–14
Yoshiko Yonekura	2–0	Verawaty Fadjrin	11–8, 11–2

=== Final ===
29 September	China	5–0	Japan

Li Lingwei	2–1	Sumiko Kitada	8–11, 12–10, 11–1
Han Aiping	2–0	Kimiko Jinnai	11–1, 11–3
Lin Ying / Guan Weizhen	2–0	Atsuko Tokuda / Yoshiko Yonekura	15–3, 15–2
Li Lingwei / Han Aiping	2–1	Sumiko Kitada / Kimiko Jinnai	15–6, 9–15, 15–5
Zheng Yuli	2–0	Yoshiko Yonekura	11–2, 11–6

== Non-participating athletes ==
- Gu Jiaming (CHN)
- Qian Ping (CHN)
- Wu Jianqiu (CHN)
- Hisako Takamine (JPN)
- Chung So-young (KOR)
- Kang Haeng-suk (KOR)
- Kim Ho-ja (KOR)
- Lee Myung-hee (KOR)
