= 1983 World Badminton Grand Prix Finals =

Tournament details
- Dates: 14–18 December
- Edition: 1
- Total prize money: US$70,000
- Venue: Istora Senayan
- Location: Jakarta, Indonesia

The 1983 World Badminton Grand Prix was the first edition of the World Badminton Grand Prix finals. It was held in Istora Senayan, Jakarta, Indonesia, from December 14 to December 18, 1983.

== Results ==
=== Third place ===
Category	Winner	Runner-up	Score
Men's singles	(Malaysia) Misbun Sidek	(India) Prakash Padukone	18–14, 15–8
Women's singles	(China) Zhang Ailing	(Denmark) Kirsten Larsen	11–3, 11–2

=== Finals ===
Category	Winners	Runners-up	Score
Men's singles	(China) Luan Jin	(Denmark) Morten Frost	15–2, 15–6
Women's singles	(China) Li Lingwei	(China) Han Aiping	11–0, 4–11, 11–4
