= 1985 World Badminton Grand Prix Finals =

Tournament details
- Dates: 12–15 December
- Edition: 3
- Total prize money: US$87,900
- Location: Tokyo, Japan

The 1985 World Badminton Grand Prix was the third edition of the World Badminton Grand Prix finals. It was held in Tokyo, Japan, from December 12 to December 15, 1985.

== Results ==
=== Third place ===
Category	Winner	Runner-up	Score
Men's singles	(Denmark) Morten Frost	(China) Yang Yang	5–15, 15–9, 15–9
Women's singles	(China) Wu Jianqiu	(Denmark) Kirsten Larsen	11–6, 11–1

=== Final ===
Category	Winners	Runners-up	Score
Men's singles	(China) Han Jian	(Australia) Sze Yu	15–6, 15–3
Women's singles	(China) Li Lingwei	(China) Han Aiping	11–3, 11–3
