= Kim Bok-sun =

South Korean badminton player

Personal information
- Country: South Korea
Medal record
Women's badminton
Representing South Korea
Asian Championships
Silver medal – second place	1983 Calcutta	Women's doubles

- Kim Bok-sun
- Hangul: 김복선
- Hanja: 金福仙
- RR: Gim Bokseon
- MR: Kim Poksŏn

Kim Bok-sun (Korean: 김복선; Hanja: 金福仙) is a retired female badminton player from South Korea. She specialized in women's singles. She reached the women's singles quarter-finals of the IBF World Championships in 1983 and 1985. She is the mother of doubles player Chae Yoo-jung.
