= Gu Jiaming =

Chinese badminton player

Gu Jiaming 辜家明
Personal information
- Born: 1964 (age 61–62) Jingzhou, Hubei, China

Sport
- Country: China
- Sport: Badminton
Medal record
Women's badminton
Representing China
World Championships
Bronze medal – third place	1987 Beijing	Women's singles
Uber Cup
Gold medal – first place	1988 Kuala Lumpur	Women's team
Asian Games
Gold medal – first place	1986 Seoul	Women's team

Gu Jiaming (Chinese: 辜家明, born 1964 in Jingzhou, Hubei) is a retired female badminton player from China.

== Career ==
She won the bronze medal at the 1987 IBF World Championships in the women's singles. The following year she won the women's singles at the prestigious All-England Championships beating Korea's Lee Young-suk and she played the winning singles for China's world champion Uber Cup (women's international) team.

== Achievements ==
=== World Championships ===
Women's singles
Year	Venue	Opponent	Score	Result
1987	Capital Indoor Stadium; Beijing, China	(China) Han Aiping	4–11, 0–11	Bronze

=== IBF World Grand Prix ===
The World Badminton Grand Prix sanctioned by International Badminton Federation (IBF) from 1983 to 2006.

Women's singles
Year	Tournament	Opponent	Score	Result
1988	All England Open	(South Korea) Lee Young-suk	11–2, 11–2	(gold) Winner
1988	Swedish Open	(China) Han Aiping	3–11, 1–11	(silver) Runner-up
1988	Japan Open	(China) Han Aiping	4–11, 5–11	(silver) Runner-up
1988	French Open	(South Korea) Hwang Hye-young	11–12, 8–11	(silver) Runner-up

Women's doubles
Year	Tournament	Partner	Opponent	Score	Result
1986	Denmark Open	(China) Zheng Yuli	(England) Gillian Clark (England) Gillian Gowers	15–9, 15–18, 16–17	(silver) Runner-up

=== Invitational tournament ===
Women's singles
Year	Tournament	Opponent	Score	Result
1987	Konica Cup	(Indonesia) Elizabeth Latief	11–1, 6–11, 6–11	Silver
