= 1986 World Badminton Grand Prix Finals =

Tournament details
- Dates: 16–21 December
- Edition: 4
- Total prize money: US$151,050
- Location: Kuala Lumpur, Malaysia

The 1986 World Badminton Grand Prix was the fourth edition of the World Badminton Grand Prix finals. It was held in Kuala Lumpur, Malaysia, from December 16 to December 21, 1986.

== Final results ==
Category	Winners	Runners-up	Score
Men's singles	(China) Yang Yang	(Denmark) Morten Frost	18–13, 15–8
Women's singles	(China) Li Lingwei	(China) Han Aiping	11–5, 11–3
Men's doubles	(Malaysia) Jalani Sidek & Razif Sidek	(Indonesia) Hadibowo & Eddy Hartono	10–15, 15–5, 18–13
Women's doubles	(South Korea) Hwang Hye-young & Chung Myung-hee	(Indonesia) Verawaty Wiharjo & Ivana Lie	15–10, 15–6
Mixed doubles	(England) Nigel Tier & Gillian Gowers	(Sweden) Thomas Kihlström & Christine Magnusson	15–8, 18–15
