= Hwang Hye-young =

South Korean badminton player (born 1966)

Personal information
- Born: 16 July 1966 (age 60) Jeungpyeong-gun, Chungcheongbuk-do, South Korea
- Height: 1.7 m (5 ft 7 in)
- Weight: 48 kg (106 lb)

Sport
- Country: South Korea
- Sport: Badminton
- Event: Women's & mixed doubles
Medal record
Women's badminton
Representing South Korea
Olympic Games
Gold medal – first place	1992 Barcelona	Women's doubles
World Championships
Silver medal – second place	1989 Jakarta	Women's doubles
Bronze medal – third place	1987 Beijing	Women's doubles
Bronze medal – third place	1991 Copenhagen	Women's doubles
World Cup
Gold medal – first place	1991 Macau	Women's doubles
Silver medal – second place	1989 Guangzhou	Women's doubles
Bronze medal – third place	1986 Bandung-Jakarta	Women's singles
Bronze medal – third place	1988 Bangkok	Women's singles
Bronze medal – third place	1986 Bandung-Jakarta	Women's doubles
Bronze medal – third place	1987 Kuala Lumpur	Women's doubles
Bronze medal – third place	1990 Bandung-Jakarta	Women's doubles
Bronze medal – third place	1991 Macau	Mixed doubles
Sudirman Cup
Gold medal – first place	1991 Copenhagen	Mixed team
Silver medal – second place	1989 Jakarta	Mixed team
Uber Cup
Silver medal – second place	1988 Kuala Lumpur	Women's team
Silver medal – second place	1990 Nagoya–Tokyo	Women's team
Silver medal – second place	1992 Kuala Lumpur	Women's team
Asian Games
Bronze medal – third place	1986 Seoul	Women's singles
Bronze medal – third place	1986 Seoul	Women's team
Bronze medal – third place	1990 Beijing	Women's team
Asian Championships
Gold medal – first place	1991 Kuala Lumpur	Women's doubles
Silver medal – second place	1985 Kuala Lumpur	Women's doubles
Asian Cup
Gold medal – first place	1991 Jakarta	Women's doubles

- Hwang Hye-young
- Hangul: 황혜영
- Hanja: 黃惠英
- RR: Hwang Hyeyeong
- MR: Hwang Hyeyŏng

Hwang Hye-young (born 16 July 1966) is a South Korean badminton player.

She won the gold medal in women's doubles together with Chung So-young at the 1992 Summer Olympics in Barcelona. She was also the Gold medallist in the 1988 Olympics in Women's singles category, when Badminton was an exhibition sport in Olympics. She defeated Han Aiping in 3 games 1–11, 11–8, 11–6.

== Achievements ==
=== Olympic Games ===
Women's singles
Year	Venue	Opponent	Score	Result
1988 (exhibition)	Seoul National University Gymnasium, Seoul, South Korea	(China) Han Aiping	1–11, 11–8, 11–6	Gold

Women's doubles
Year	Venue	Partner	Opponent	Score	Result
1992	Pavelló de la Mar Bella, Barcelona, Spain	(South Korea) Chung So-young	(China) Guan Weizhen (China) Nong Qunhua	18–16, 12–15, 15–13	Gold

=== World Championships ===
Women's doubles
Year	Venue	Partner	Opponent	Score	Result
1987	Capital Indoor Stadium, Beijing, China	(South Korea) Chung Myung-hee	(China) Han Aiping (China) Li Lingwei	6–15, 15–6, 11–15	Bronze
1989	Senayan Sports Complex, Jakarta, Indonesia	(South Korea) Chung Myung-hee	(China) Guan Weizhen (China) Lin Ying	1–15, 7–15	Silver
1991	Brøndby Arena, Copenhagen, Denmark	(South Korea) Chung So-young	(China) Guan Weizhen (China) Nong Qunhua	7–15, 8–15	Bronze

=== World Cup ===
Women's singles
Year	Venue	Opponent	Score	Result
1986	Istora Senayan, Jakarta, Indonesia	(China) Han Aiping	12–10, 4–11, 4–11	Bronze
1988	National Stadium, Bangkok, Thailand	(China) Han Aiping	11–4, 1–11, 1–11	Bronze

Women's doubles
Year	Venue	Partner	Opponent	Score	Result
1986	Istora Senayan, Jakarta, Indonesia	(South Korea) Chung Myung-hee	(China) Han Aiping (China) Li Lingwei	7–15, 7–15	Bronze
1987	Stadium Negara, Kuala Lumpur, Malaysia	(South Korea) Chung Myung-hee	(China) Guan Weizhen (China) Lin Ying	14–18, 8–15	Bronze
1989	Guangzhou Gymnasium, Guangzhou, China	(South Korea) Chung So-young	(China) Guan Weizhen (China) Lin Ying	2–15, 15–17	Silver
1990	Istora Senayan, Jakarta, Indonesia	(South Korea) Chung So-young	(China) Lai Caiqin (China) Yao Fen	15–12, 7–15, 10–15	Bronze
1991	Macau Forum, Macau	(South Korea) Chung So-young	(Indonesia) Erma Sulistianingsih (Indonesia) Rosiana Tendean	15–3, 15–3	Gold

Mixed doubles
Year	Venue	Partner	Opponent	Score	Result
1991	Macau Forum, Macau	(South Korea) Kim Hak-kyun	(Indonesia) Rudy Gunawan (Indonesia) Rosiana Tendean	8–15, 9–15	Bronze

=== Asian Games ===
Women's singles
Year	Venue	Opponent	Score	Result
1986	Olympic Gymnastics Arena, Seoul, South Korea	(China) Li Lingwei	6–11, 7–11	Bronze

=== Asian Championships ===
Women's doubles
Year	Venue	Partner	Opponent	Score	Result
1985	Stadium Negara, Kuala Lumpur, Malaysia	(South Korea) Chung So-young	(South Korea) Kim Yun-ja (South Korea) Yoo Sang-hee	5–15, 4–15	Silver
1991	Cheras Indoor Stadium, Kuala Lumpur, Malaysia	(South Korea) Chung So-young	(South Korea) Gil Young-ah (South Korea) Shim Eun-jung	15–2, 13–18, 15–4	Gold

=== Asian Cup ===
Women's doubles
Year	Venue	Partner	Opponent	Score	Result
1991	Istora Senayan, Jakarta, Indonesia	(South Korea) Chung So-young	(Japan) Hisako Mori (Japan) Kimiko Jinnai	15–13, 15–1	Gold

=== IBF World Grand Prix (22 titles, 14 runners-up) ===
The World Badminton Grand Prix sanctioned by International Badminton Federation (IBF) from 1983 to 2006.

Women's singles
Year	Tournament	Opponent	Score	Result
1986	Scandinavian Cup	(China) Qian Ping	4–11, 7–11	(silver) Runner-up
1987	Japan Open	(China) Li Lingwei	3–11, 6–11	(silver) Runner-up
1987	Indonesia Open	(China) Li Lingwei	5–11, 6–11	(silver) Runner-up
1988	French Open	(China) Gu Jiaming	12–11, 11–8	(gold) Winner
1990	French Open	(South Korea) Lee Young-suk	11–4, 11–6	(gold) Winner

Women's doubles
Year	Tournament	Partner	Opponent	Score	Result
1986	All England Open	(South Korea) Chung Myung-hee	(South Korea) Kim Yun-ja (South Korea) Yoo Sang-hee	15–5, 6–15, 15–8	(gold) Winner
1986	German Open	(South Korea) Chung Myung-hee	(South Korea) Kim Yun-ja (South Korea) Yoo Sang-hee	10–15, 5–15	(silver) Runner-up
1986	World Grand Prix Finals	(South Korea) Chung Myung-hee	(Indonesia) Verawaty Fadjrin (Indonesia) Ivana Lie	15–10, 15–6	(gold) Winner
1987	All England Open	(South Korea) Chung Myung-hee	(China) Guan Weizhen (China) Lin Ying	15–6, 8–15, 15–11	(gold) Winner
1987	Japan Open	(South Korea) Chung Myung-hee	(China) Guan Weizhen (China) Lin Ying	5–15, 6–15	(silver) Runner-up
1987	Chinese Taipei Open	(South Korea) Chung Myung-hee	(Sweden) Maria Bengtsson (Sweden) Christine Magnusson	14–17, 15–9, 15–4	(gold) Winner
1987	French Open	(South Korea) Chung Myung-hee	(South Korea) Chung So-young (South Korea) Kim Ho-ja	4–15, 15–9, 15–7	(gold) Winner
1987	World Grand Prix Finals	(South Korea) Chung Myung-hee	(China) Guan Weizhen (China) Lin Ying	6–15, 15–13, 4–15	(silver) Runner-up
1988	All England Open	(South Korea) Chung Myung-hee	(South Korea) Chung So-young (South Korea) Kim Yun-ja	8–15, 15–9 retired	(silver) Runner-up
1988	Indonesia Open	(South Korea) Chung Myung-hee	(Indonesia) Verawaty Fadjrin (Indonesia) Yanti Kusmiati	6–15, 15–6, 8–15	(silver) Runner-up
1988	Thailand Open	(South Korea) Chung Myung-hee	(China) Luo Yun (China) Shi Wen	15–7, 17–16	(gold) Winner
1988	French Open	(South Korea) Chung Myung-hee	(South Korea) Chung So-young (South Korea) Kim Yun-ja	15–9, 18–13	(gold) Winner
1988	World Grand Prix Finals	(South Korea) Chung Myung-hee	(China) Guan Weizhen (China) Lin Ying	4–15, 9–15	(silver) Runner-up
1989	Swedish Open	(South Korea) Lee Young-suk	(South Korea) Chung Myung-hee (South Korea) Chung So-young	3–15, 5–15	(silver) Runner-up
1989	Malaysia Open	(South Korea) Chung So-young	(China) Guan Weizhen (China) Lin Ying	4–15, 4–15	(silver) Runner-up
1989	Thailand Open	(South Korea) Chung So-young	(China) Guan Weizhen (China) Lin Ying	15–5, 17–18, 9–15	(silver) Runner-up
1989	Hong Kong Open	(South Korea) Chung So-young	(China) Guan Weizhen (China) Lin Ying	4–15, 9–15	(silver) Runner-up
1990	All England Open	(South Korea) Chung Myung-hee	(England) Gillian Clark (England) Gillian Gowers	6–15, 15–4, 15–4	(gold) Winner
1990	French Open	(South Korea) Chung Myung-hee	(Indonesia) Verawaty Fadjrin (Indonesia) Ivana Lie	15–2, 15–1	(gold) Winner
1991	Korea Open	(South Korea) Chung So-young	(South Korea) Gil Young-ah (South Korea) Shim Eun-jung	17–16, 17–14	(gold) Winner
1991	All England Open	(South Korea) Chung So-young	(Japan) Hisako Mori (Japan) Kimiko Jinnai	15–5, 15–3	(gold) Winner
1991	Malaysia Open	(South Korea) Chung So-young	(England) Gillian Clark (Denmark) Nettie Nielsen	15–10, 15–11	(gold) Winner
1991	Indonesia Open	(South Korea) Chung Myung-hee	(South Korea) Chung So-young (South Korea) Gil Young-ah	14–18, 15–10, 15–9	(gold) Winner
1991	Thailand Open	(South Korea) Gil Young-ah	(Netherlands) Eline Coene (Netherlands) Erica van den Heuvel	15–10, 15–6	(gold) Winner
1991	China Open	(South Korea) Chung Myung-hee	(China) Guan Weizhen (China) Nong Qunhua	15–6, 15–2	(gold) Winner
1991	Hong Kong Open	(South Korea) Gil Young-ah	(South Korea) Chung Myung-hee (South Korea) Shim Eun-jung	15–10, 15–4	(gold) Winner
1991	World Grand Prix Finals	(South Korea) Chung So-young	(Indonesia) Erma Sulistianingsih (Indonesia) Rosiana Tendean	18–15, 15–3	(gold) Winner
1992	Japan Open	(South Korea) Chung So-young	(South Korea) Gil Young-ah (South Korea) Shim Eun-jung	15–5, 15–10	(gold) Winner
1992	Korea Open	(South Korea) Chung So-young	(South Korea) Gil Young-ah (South Korea) Shim Eun-jung	15–6, 15–7	(gold) Winner

Mixed doubles
Year	Tournament	Partner	Opponent	Score	Result
1989	Thailand Open	(South Korea) Kim Moon-soo	(South Korea) Park Joo-bong (South Korea) Chung So-young	4–15, 2–15	(silver) Runner-up
1989	China Open	(South Korea) Kim Hak-kyun	(Hong Kong) Chan Chi Choi (Hong Kong) Amy Chan	18–13, 15–5	(gold) Winner

=== IBF International (4 titles, 1 runner-up) ===
Women's doubles
Year	Tournament	Partner	Opponent	Score	Result
1987	Konica Cup	(South Korea) Chung Myung-hee	(Indonesia) Ivana Lie (Indonesia) Rosiana Tendean	15–5, 15–4	(gold) Winner
1988	Polish International	(South Korea) Chung Myung-hee	(South Korea) Lee Heung-soon (South Korea) Lee Young-suk	15–6, 15–9	(gold) Winner
1989	Konica Cup	(South Korea) Chung Myung-hee	(China) Guan Weizhen (China) Lin Ying	6–15, 8–15	(silver) Runner-up
1990	Hungarian International	(South Korea) Yoon Sook-jung	(Soviet Union) Natalia Ivanova (Soviet Union) Tatiana Khoroshina	15–13, 15–8	(gold) Winner

Mixed doubles
Year	Tournament	Partner	Opponent	Score	Result
1990	Hungarian International	(South Korea) Lee Sang-bok	(South Korea) Shon Jin-hwan (South Korea) Park Kyung-hee	15–7, 15–9	(gold) Winner

=== Invitational tournament ===
Women's doubles
Year	Tournament	Partner	Opponent	Score	Result
1988	Asian Invitational Championships; Bandar Lampung, Indonesia	(South Korea) Chung Myung-hee	(Indonesia) Verawaty Fadjrin (Indonesia) Yanti Kusmiati	16–18, 14–18	Silver
