= Han Aiping =

Chinese badminton player (1962–2019)

Han Aiping 韩爱萍
Personal information
- Born: 22 April 1962 Wuhan, China
- Died: 16 October 2019 (aged 57) Wuhan, China

Sport
- Country: China
- Sport: Badminton
- Handedness: Right
Medal record
Women's badminton
Representing China
World Championships
Gold medal – first place	1979 Hangzhou	Women's singles
Gold medal – first place	1979 Hangzhou	Women's team
Gold medal – first place	1985 Calgary	Women's singles
Gold medal – first place	1985 Calgary	Women's doubles
Gold medal – first place	1987 Beijing	Women's singles
Silver medal – second place	1983 Copenhagen	Women's singles
Silver medal – second place	1987 Beijing	Women's doubles
Bronze medal – third place	1979 Hangzhou	Women's doubles
World Cup
Gold medal – first place	1983 Kuala Lumpur	Women's singles
Gold medal – first place	1983 Kuala Lumpur	Women's doubles
Gold medal – first place	1986 Jakarta	Women's doubles
Gold medal – first place	1987 Kuala Lumpur	Women's doubles
Gold medal – first place	1988 Bangkok	Women's singles
Silver medal – second place	1984 Jakarta	Women's singles
Silver medal – second place	1986 Jakarta	Women's singles
Silver medal – second place	1987 Kuala Lumpur	Women's singles
Silver medal – second place	1989 Guangzhou	Women's singles
Bronze medal – third place	1985 Jakarta	Women's doubles
Sudirman Cup
Bronze medal – third place	1989 Jakarta	Mixed team
Uber Cup
Gold medal – first place	1984 Kuala Lumpur	Women's team
Gold medal – first place	1986 Jakarta	Women's team
Gold medal – first place	1988 Kuala Lumpur	Women's team
Asian Games
Gold medal – first place	1986 Seoul	Women's singles
Gold medal – first place	1986 Seoul	Women's team

Han Aiping (Chinese: 韩爱萍; April 22, 1962 – October 16, 2019) was a Chinese badminton player in the 1980s who ranks among the greats of the woman's game. Noted for her superb overhead strokes, she and her teammate, rival, and sometimes doubles partner Li Lingwei dominated international singles play for most of the decade, with Han winning the World Championships 3 times (1979, 1985, 1987) and World Cup 2 times (1983, 1988), in addition to winning the Asian Games 1 time, and led Chinese teams to victory in Uber Cup (women's world team) competitions.

== Career ==
=== Early career ===
Han Aiping began her badminton training at the age of 10 in the Wuhan Amateur Sports School. As a highly talented 12-year-old she joined the Hubei provincial team in 1974. In 1977 she finished second at the Chinese national championships and joined the National Chinese team at the age of 16 the following year. In the late 1970s, before China was admitted to the International Badminton Federation (now the Badminton World Federation), it promoted a rival organization, the World Badminton Federation which held its own version of a world championship in both 1978 and 1979. At just 17 Han won women's singles at the second of these. However, her meteoric rise was interrupted by health problems, and after being diagnosed with hyperthyroidism in 1980, on medical orders she was forced out of competition for two years. Resuming her badminton training late in 1982, she finished second at the next Chinese National Badminton Championships to another rising young star Li Lingwei. With China having been admitted to the IBF in 1981 Han and her teammates could now compete in all the major world events. In 1983 she won singles at the Japan Open and singles and women's doubles at the Badminton World Cup. At the 1983 World Championships Han defeated her top seeded compatriot Zhang Ailing in the semifinals but was defeated by an increasingly familiar opponent, Li Lingwei, in the finals.

=== Later career and rivalry with Li Lingwei ===
Han Aiping and her compatriot Li Lingwei repeatedly faced each other in the singles finals of major international tournaments from 1983 through 1988. Li maintained a won/lost edge in this rivalry, and in three successive winning Uber Cup competitions (1984, 1986, and 1988) played first singles for China ahead of Han at second singles. However, when they faced each other in badminton's most prestigious events, Han was arguably very much Li's equal. For example, Han lost the final of the 1983 World Championship to Li, but defeated Li in their next World Championship showdown in 1987, after having won the previous 1985 World Championship when Li had suffered a rare semifinal defeat. They exchanged victories in two consecutive finals at the venerable All England Championships, badminton's oldest event, with Li winning in 1984, and Han winning in 1985, and also at the China Open which Han won in 1986 and Li won in 1987. Han also won their only meeting at the quadrennial Asian Games in 1986. Throughout their rivalry they remained good friends and were often successful women's doubles partners at a time when, increasingly, elite singles players no longer entered doubles and elite doubles players no longer entered singles. In 1985 they captured women's doubles titles at both the All Englands and World Championships. They won three women's doubles titles together at the now defunct Badminton World Cup in 1983, 1986, and 1987. At the 1987 World Championships where Han won her second consecutive world singles title, she and Li had to settle for silver in women's doubles, losing to their compatriots Lin Ying and Guan Weizhen in the finals.

By 1988 new young stars were emerging from China as well as from South Korea and Indonesia to challenge the Li/Han hegemony. In the exhibition tournament held at the 1988 Seoul Olympics which Li Lingwei did not contest, Han was upset in a close final by South Korea's Hwang Hye-Young. Though she won a number of events in her last two seasons of international play, occasionally Han was beaten by someone other than Li. In particular, China was relying on two young women, Tang Jiuhong and Huang Hua to take over for proven great players who were perhaps wearying of the training and tournament grind. In mid 1989 Han decided to end her playing career.

== Personal life ==
After leaving the National Chinese badminton team Han and her husband Guo Ming went to Australia to study in March 1990. In April she was invited to give lectures in Japan's Olympic Intensification Program and then taught at the Suntory Badminton Club in Japan. In June 1994 she was reunited with her husband in Australia and cooperated with the local badminton club to train the team members to participate in the competition on behalf of the club. At the end of November 2002 she returned to China to serve as the head coach and head of the teaching and research team of the Hubei Badminton Women's Team. Dongfanghong Primary School, Qiaokou District, Wuhan City, established a badminton school named after her and officially unveiled this in September 2005. In 2013, she was elected at the 12th National Committee of the Chinese People's Political Consultative Conference.

Han Aiping and her husband Guo Ming had two daughters. They traveled to Japan and Australia with the children before returning to Wuhan, Hubei, to settle in 2002. Later, in order to better re-engage their daughters in the English language they sent them to Singapore. The elder daughter, Guo Yushan, conducted badminton training at a local club, while the second daughter, Han Yalu, went into tennis training.

== Death ==
Han was inducted into the Badminton Hall of Fame in 1998. She died on 16 October 2019 due to lung cancer at the age of 57.

== Achievements ==
=== Olympic Games (exhibition) ===
Women's singles
Year	Venue	Opponent	Score	Result
1988	Seoul National University Gymnasium; Seoul, South Korea	(South Korea) Hwang Hye-young	11–1, 8–11, 6–11	Silver

=== World Championships ===
Women's singles
Year	Venue	Opponent	Score	Result
1987	Capital Indoor Stadium, Beijing, China	(China) Li Lingwei	10–12, 11–4, 11–7	Gold
1985	Olympic Saddledome, Calgary, Canada	(China) Wu Jianqiu	6–11, 12–11, 11–2	Gold
1983	Brøndbyhallen, Copenhagen, Denmark	(China) Li Lingwei	8–11, 11–6, 7–11	Silver
1979	Hangzhou, China	(China) Fu Chun-e	9–11, 11–0, 11–4	Gold

Women's doubles
Year	Venue	Partner	Opponent	Score	Result
1987	Capital Indoor Stadium, Beijing, China	(China) Li Lingwei	(China) Guan Weizhen (China) Lin Ying	7–15, 8–15	Silver
1985	Olympic Saddledome, Calgary, Canada	(China) Li Lingwei	(China) Lin Ying (China) Wu Dixi	15–9, 14–18, 15–9	Gold
1979	Hangzhou, China	(China) He Cuiling	(Thailand) Sirisriro Patama (Thailand) Suleeporn Jittariyakul	12–15, 12–15	Bronze

=== World Cup ===
Women's singles
Year	Venue	Opponent	Score	Result
1989	Guangzhou Gymnasium, Guangzhou, China	(Indonesia) Susi Susanti	5–11, 4–11	Silver
1988	National Stadium, Bangkok, Thailand	(China) Li Lingwei	5–11, 11–6, 11–0	Gold
1987	Stadium Negara, Kuala Lumpur, Malaysia	(China) Li Lingwei	8–11, 8–11	Silver
1986	Istora Senayan, Jakarta, Indonesia	(China) Li Lingwei	8–11, 3–11	Silver
1984	Istora Senayan, Jakarta, Indonesia	(China) Li Lingwei	12–10, 4–11, 7–11	Silver
1983	Stadium Negara, Kuala Lumpur, Malaysia	(China) Zhang Ailing	6–11, 11–5, 11–4	Gold

Women's doubles
Year	Venue	Partner	Opponent	Score	Result
1987	Stadium Negara, Kuala Lumpur, Malaysia	(China) Li Lingwei	(China) Guan Weizhen (China) Lin Ying	15–10, 11–15, 15–5	Gold
1986	Istora Senayan, Jakarta, Indonesia	(China) Li Lingwei	(Indonesia) Imelda Wiguna (Indonesia) Rosiana Tendean	15–7, 15–7	Gold
1985	Istora Senayan, Jakarta, Indonesia	(China) Li Lingwei	(South Korea) Kim Yun-ja (South Korea) Yoo Sang-hee	11–15, 15–11, 3–15	Bronze
1983	Stadium Negara, Kuala Lumpur, Malaysia	(China) Li Lingwei	(China) Wu Jianqiu (China) Xu Rong	6–15, 15–8, 15–5	Gold

=== Asian Games ===
Women's singles
Year	Venue	Opponent	Score	Result
1986	Olympic Gymnastics Arena, Seoul, South Korea	(China) Li Lingwei	11–6, 11–9	Gold

=== IBF Grand Prix (21 titles, 18 runners-up) ===
The World Badminton Grand Prix sanctioned by International Badminton Federation (IBF) from 1983 to 2006.

Women's singles
Year	Tournament	Opponent	Score	Result
1983	Japan Open	(Denmark) Kirsten Larsen	11–2, 11–4	(gold) Winner
1983	Grand Prix Finals	(China) Li Lingwei	0–11, 11–4, 4–11	(silver) Runner-up
1984	All England Open	(China) Li Lingwei	5–11, 8–11	(silver) Runner-up
1984	Scandinavian Cup	(China) Wu Dixi	9–11, 11–2, 11–2	(gold) Winner
1984	Dutch Masters	(Denmark) Kirsten Larsen	11–7, 11–0	(gold) Winner
1984	Grand Prix Finals	(Indonesia) Ivana Lie	11–3, 11–2	(gold) Winner
1985	Hong Kong Open	(China) Zheng Yuli	11–6, 11–2	(gold) Winner
1985	Indonesia Open	(China) Li Lingwei	9–11, 8–11	(silver) Runner-up
1985	All England Open	(China) Li Lingwei	11–7, 12–10	(gold) Winner
1985	Swedish Open	(China) Li Lingwei	11–8, 8–11, 12–10	(gold) Winner
1985	Grand Prix Finals	(China) Li Lingwei	3–11, 3–11	(silver) Runner-up
1986	Hong Kong Open	(China) Li Lingwei	12–10, 8–11, 10–12	(silver) Runner-up
1986	Japan Open	(China) Li Lingwei	11–4, 9–12, 9–12	(silver) Runner-up
1986	China Open	(China) Li Lingwei	11–3, 11–6	(gold) Winner
1986	Grand Prix Finals	(China) Li Lingwei	5–11, 3–11	(silver) Runner-up
1987	Hong Kong Open	(Denmark) Kirsten Larsen	11–4, 11–8	(gold) Winner
1987	Malaysian Open	(China) Li Lingwei	3–11, 11–2, 9–12	(silver) Runner-up
1987	Thailand Open	(China) Luo Yun	11–3, 8–11, 1–11	(silver) Runner-up
1987	China Open	(China) Li Lingwei	11–6, 5–11, 10–12	(silver) Runner-up
1987	Grand Prix Finals	(China) Li Lingwei	8–11, 5–11	(silver) Runner-up
1988	English Masters	(China) Li Lingwei	11–4, 5–11, 9–12	(silver) Runner-up
1988	Denmark Open	(China) Li Lingwei	7–11, 7–11	(silver) Runner-up
1988	Japan Open	(China) Gu Jiaming	11–4, 11–5	(gold) Winner
1988	Malaysian Open	(China) Li Lingwei	11–7, 11–3	(gold) Winner
1988	Swedish Open	(China) Gu Jiaming	11–3, 11–1	(gold) Winner
1988	German Open	(Denmark) Kirsten Larsen	11–8, 11–9	(gold) Winner
1988	Hong Kong Open	(South Korea) Lee Young-suk	11–8, 1–11, 8–11	(silver) Runner-up
1988	Grand Prix Finals	(South Korea) Lee Young-suk	11–1, 11–5	(gold) Winner
1989	Denmark Open	(China) Tang Jiuhong	0–11, 1–11	(silver) Runner-up
1989	Malaysian Open	(China) Luo Yun	6–11, 11–6, 11–7	(gold) Winner
1989	Hong Kong Open	(China) Zhou Lei	11–12, 11–7, 11–3	(gold) Winner
1989	Grand Prix Finals	(China) Tang Jiuhong	11–12, 10–12	(silver) Runner-up

Women's doubles
Year	Tournament	Partner	Opponent	Score	Result
1985	Hong Kong Open	(China) Xu Rong	(China) Wu Dixi (China) Lin Ying	15–4, 15–7	(gold) Winner
1985	Indonesian Open	(China) Li Lingwei	(Indonesia) Ivana Lie (Indonesia) Rosiana Tendean	15–7, 15–8	(gold) Winner
1985	All England Open	(China) Li Lingwei	(China) Wu Dixi (China) Lin Ying	15–7, 15–12	(gold) Winner
1985	Swedish Open	(China) Li Lingwei	(China) Wu Jianqiu (China) Guan Weizhen	15–12, 15–6	(gold) Winner
1986	Hong Kong Open	(China) Li Lingwei	(China) Guan Weizhen (China) Lao Yujing	18–15, 15–9	(gold) Winner
1986	Japan Open	(China) Li Lingwei	(China) Wu Dixi (China) Lin Ying	4–15, 8–15	(silver) Runner-up
1988	Hong Kong Open	(China) Shang Fumei	(China) Guan Weizhen (China) Lin Ying	10–15, 4–15	(silver) Runner-up

=== Invitational tournament (3 titles, 1 runners-up) ===
Women's singles
Year	Tournament	Opponent	Score	Result
1985	Malaysian Masters	(China) Li Lingwei	11–6, 12–10	(gold) Winner
1989	Konica Cup	(South Korea) Lee Young-suk	11–0, 11–5	(gold) Winner

Women's doubles
Year	Tournament	Partner	Opponent	Score	Result
1978	WBF World Invitational Championships	(China) Xu Jung	(China) Li Fang (China) Liang Qiuxia	5–15, 7–15	Silver
1985	Malaysian Masters	(China) Li Lingwei	(China) Wu Dixi (China) Lin Ying	5–15, 15–12, 15–12	(gold) Winner
