= Qian Ping =

Chinese badminton player

Qian Ping 钱萍
Personal information
- Born: 1964 (age 61–62) Jiangxi, China

Sport
- Country: China
- Sport: Badminton
Medal record
Women's badminton
Representing China
World Cup
Bronze medal – third place	1984 Jakarta	Women's singles
Uber Cup
Gold medal – first place	1984 Kuala Lumpur	Women's team
Gold medal – first place	1986 Jakarta	Women's team
Asian Games
Gold medal – first place	1986 Seoul	Women's team
Bronze medal – third place	1986 Seoul	Mixed doubles
Asian Championships
Silver medal – second place	1985 Kuala Lumpur	Women's singles
Bronze medal – third place	1985 Kuala Lumpur	Women's doubles

Qian Ping (Chinese: 钱萍; born 1964) is a former world level badminton player from China.

== Career ==
Qian was among the youngest of an impressive cadre of Chinese players who largely dominated women's international badminton after China joined the International Badminton Federation (now Badminton World Federation) in 1981. She was a member of China's world champion Uber Cup (women's international) teams of 1984 and 1986. Qian won singles at the Denmark (1982 autumn), and German (1985, 1987) Opens, and was a runner-up in several other top tier tournaments on the world circuit, including the All-England Championships in both 1986 and 1987. In the second of these All-England finals, playing Denmark's Kirsten Larsen, she was forced to default after injuring her knee, an event that apparently ended her serious playing career.

== Achievements ==
=== World Cup ===
Women's singles
Year	Venue	Opponent	Score	Result
1984	Istora Senayan; Jakarta, Indonesia	(China) Li Lingwei	7–11, 8–11	Bronze

=== Asian Games ===
Mixed doubles
Year	Venue	Partner	Opponent	Score	Result
1986	Olympic Gymnastics Arena; Seoul, South Korea	(China) Xiong Guobao	(South Korea) Park Joo-bong (South Korea) Chung Myung-hee	9–15, 9–15	Bronze

=== Asian Championships ===
Women's singles
Year	Venue	Opponent	Score	Result
1985	Stadium Negara; Kuala Lumpur, Malaysia	(China) Zheng Yuli	6–11, 9–12	Silver

Women's doubles
Year	Venue	Partner	Opponent	Score	Result
1985	Stadium Negara; Kuala Lumpur, Malaysia	(China) Zheng Yuli	(China) Liu Aizhen (China) He Yanling	15–12, 15–7	Bronze

=== IBF World Grand Prix ===
The World Badminton Grand Prix sanctioned by International Badminton Federation (IBF) from 1983 to 2006.

Women's singles
Year	Tournament	Opponent	Score	Result
1983	Malaysia Open	(China) Pan Zhenli	9–11, 5–11	(silver) Runner-up
1983	Indonesia Open	(Indonesia) Ivana Lie	11–12, 2–11	(silver) Runner-up
1984	Japan Open	(China) Zheng Yuli	2–11, 11–7, 7–11	(silver) Runner-up
1985	German Open	(China) Zheng Yuli	3–1 retired	(gold) Winner
1985	Thailand Open	(China) Wu Jianqiu	7–11, 7–11	(silver) Runner-up
1986	Scandinavian Open	(South Korea) Hwang Hye-young	11–4, 11–7	(gold) Winner
1986	All England Open	(South Korea) Kim Yun-ja	6–11, 11–12	(silver) Runner-up
1987	Scandinavian Open	(China) Li Lingwei	9–11, 6–11	(silver) Runner-up
1987	German Open	(Denmark) Charlotte Hattens	11–0, 11–2	(gold) Winner
1987	All England Open	(Denmark) Kirsten Larsen	7–9 retired	(silver) Runner-up

Women's doubles
Year	Tournament	Partner	Opponent	Score	Result
1987	Scandinavian Open	(China) Li Lingwei	(China) Guan Weizhen (China) Lin Ying	1–15, 8–15	(silver) Runner-up

=== International tournaments ===
Women's singles
Year	Tournament	Opponent	Score	Result
1982	Scandinavian Cup	(Japan) Sumiko Kitada	11–2, 11–8	(gold) Winner
1983	Denmark Open			(gold) Winner
