= Ivana Lie =

Indonesian badminton player

Ivana Lie 李英華
Personal information
- Born: Ivana Lie Ing Hoa; 7 March 1960 (age 66) Bandung, West Java, Indonesia

Sport
- Country: Indonesia
- Sport: Badminton
- Handedness: Right
Medal record
Women's badminton
Representing Indonesia
World Championships
Silver medal – second place	1980 Jakarta	Women's singles
World Cup
Gold medal – first place	1985 Jakarta	Mixed doubles
Silver medal – second place	1983 Kuala Lumpur	Mixed doubles
Silver medal – second place	1984 Jakarta	Mixed doubles
Silver medal – second place	1985 Jakarta	Women's singles
Bronze medal – third place	1979 Tokyo	Women's singles
Bronze medal – third place	1981 Kuala Lumpur	Women's singles
Bronze medal – third place	1983 Kuala Lumpur	Women's singles
Bronze medal – third place	1984 Jakarta	Women's singles
Bronze medal – third place	1986 Bandung–Jakarta	Women's doubles
Uber Cup
Silver medal – second place	1978 Auckland	Women's team
Silver medal – second place	1981 Tokyo	Women's team
Silver medal – second place	1986 Jakarta	Women's team
Asian Games
Gold medal – first place	1982 New Delhi	Mixed doubles
Bronze medal – third place	1986 Seoul	Women's team
SEA Games
Gold medal – first place	1979 Jakarta	Women's singles
Gold medal – first place	1979 Jakarta	Women's team
Gold medal – first place	1981 Manila	Women's team
Gold medal – first place	1985 Bangkok	Women's team
Gold medal – first place	1983 Singapore	Women's singles
Gold medal – first place	1983 Singapore	Mixed doubles
Gold medal – first place	1983 Singapore	Women's team
Silver medal – second place	1981 Manila	Women's singles
Silver medal – second place	1985 Bangkok	Women's singles
Southeast Asian Junior Championships
Gold medal – first place	1978 Singapore	Girls' singles
Gold medal – first place	1978 Singapore	Girls' doubles
Gold medal – first place	1978 Singapore	Girls' team

Ivana Lie Ing Hoa (Chinese: 李英華; pinyin: Lǐ Yīnghuá; born 7 March 1960) is an Indonesian former badminton player who played at the world level from the late 1970s to the late 1980s.

== Early life ==
Lie was born in Bandung, Indonesia on 7 March 1960. She came from a poor family; her mother was a dressmaker. She became interested in badminton during her childhood; she won a Junior Championship in West Java in 1975.

== Career ==
In the 1980 IBF World Championships in Jakarta, Lie won a silver medal in the women's singles, losing the final to fellow countrywoman Verawaty Wiharjo, after defeating defending champion Lene Køppen in the semi-final. She won the singles at the Taiwan Open in 1982, the Indonesia Open and the Southeast Asian Games in 1983, and at the Chinese Taipei Masters Invitation in 1984. She was runner-up at the 1984 World Badminton Grand Prix to China's formidable Han Aiping. Though primarily a singles player early in her career, she eventually achieved success in the other games; winning mixed doubles at the quadrennial Asian Games (1982), the Badminton World Cup (1983), and the Indonesia (1983, 1984) and U.S. (1988) Opens, all with Christian Hadinata; and winning the Indonesia Open twice (1986, 1987), the first China Open (1986), and reaching the final of the World Badminton Grand Prix (1986) in women's doubles. She played on four Indonesian Uber Cup (women's international) squads, three of which (1978, 1981, and 1986) finished second in this world team competition. Attractive and popular, she became a badminton commentator after her playing career was over.

== Achievements ==
=== World Championships ===
Women's singles
Year	Venue	Opponent	Score	Result
1980	Istora Senayan, Jakarta, Indonesia	(Indonesia) Verawaty Wiharjo	1–11, 3–11	Silver

=== World Cup ===
Women's singles
Year	Venue	Opponent	Score	Result
1979	Tokyo, Japan	(Japan) Hiroe Yuki	2–11, 3–11	Bronze
1981	Stadium Negara, Kuala Lumpur, Malaysia	(Canada) Wendy Carter	11–0, 11–8	Bronze
1983	Stadium Negara, Kuala Lumpur, Malaysia	(China) Zhang Ailing	7–11, 6–11	Bronze
1984	Istora Senayan, Jakarta, Indonesia	(China) Han Aiping	11–12, 11–6, 7–11	Bronze
1985	Istora Senayan, Jakarta, Indonesia	(China) Li Lingwei	3–11, 2–11	Silver

Women's doubles
Year	Venue	Partner	Opponent	Score	Result
1986	Istora Senayan, Jakarta, Indonesia	(Indonesia) Verawaty Fadjrin	(Indonesia) Rosiana Tendean (Indonesia) Imelda Wiguna	3–15, 14–15	Bronze

Mixed doubles
Year	Venue	Partner	Opponent	Score	Result
1983	Stadium Negara, Kuala Lumpur, Malaysia	(Indonesia) Christian Hadinata	(England) Martin Dew (England) Gillian Gilks	8–15, 15–9, 8–15	Silver
1984	Istora Senayan, Jakarta, Indonesia	(Indonesia) Christian Hadinata	(Sweden) Thomas Kihlström (England) Nora Perry	15–18, 15–13, 15–8	Silver
1985	Istora Senayan, Jakarta, Indonesia	(Indonesia) Christian Hadinata	(Denmark) Steen Fladberg (England) Nora Perry	15–11, 18–17	Gold

=== Asian Games ===
Mixed doubles
Year	Venue	Partner	Opponent	Score	Result
1982	Indraprastha Indoor Stadium, New Delhi, India	(Indonesia) Christian Hadinata	(Indonesia) Icuk Sugiarto (Indonesia) Ruth Damayanti	3–15, 15–8, 15–10	Gold

=== Southeast Asian Games ===
Women's singles
Year	Venue	Opponent	Score	Result
1979	Istora Senayan, Jakarta, Indonesia	(Indonesia) Verawaty Wiharjo	11–8, 8–11, 12–9	Gold
1981	Manila, Philippines	(Indonesia) Verawaty Fadjrin	11–6, 4–11, 7–11	Silver
1983	Singapore Badminton Hall, Singapore	(Indonesia) Elizabeth Latief	11–2, 11–4	Gold
1985	Chulalongkorn University Indoor Stadium, Bangkok, Thailand	(Indonesia) Elizabeth Latief	11–12, 11–12	Silver

Mixed doubles
Year	Venue	Partner	Opponent	Score	Result
1983	Singapore Badminton Hall, Singapore	(Indonesia) Christian Hadinata	(Indonesia) Bobby Ertanto (Indonesia) Ruth Damayanti	15–2,15–2	Gold

=== International tournaments ===
The World Badminton Grand Prix has been sanctioned by the International Badminton Federation from 1983 to 2006.

Women's singles
Year	Tournament	Opponent	Score	Result
1979	India Open	(Indonesia) Tjan So Gwan	11–1, 11–12, 10–12	(silver) Runner-up
1980	Swedish Open	(Japan) Yoshiko Yonekura	12–10, 5–11, 8–11	(silver) Runner-up
1980	Denmark Open	(Japan) Yoshiko Yonekura	8–11, 11–12	(silver) Runner-up
1981	Swedish Open	(South Korea) Hwang Sun-ai	2–11, 8–11	(silver) Runner-up
1982	Taiwan Masters	(England) Sally Podger	12–10, 3–11, 12–10	(gold) Winner
1983	Indonesia Open	(China) Qian Ping	12–11, 11–2	(gold) Winner
1983	Holland Masters	(Denmark) Kirsten Larsen	11–4, 12–10	(gold) Winner
1984	Chinese Taipei Open	(England) Helen Troke	12–11, 11–9	(gold) Winner
1984	World Grand Prix Finals	(China) Han Aiping	3–11, 2–11	(silver) Runner-up

Women's doubles
Year	Tournament	Partner	Opponent	Score	Result
1979	India Open	(Indonesia) Tjan So Gwan	(England) Karen Bridge (England) Paula Kilvington	15–9, 15–12	(gold) Winner
1983	Holland Masters	(Indonesia) Rosiana Tendean	(England) Gillian Gilks (England) Helen Troke	15–8, 15–12	(gold) Winner
1985	Indonesia Open	(Indonesia) Rosiana Tendean	(China) Han Aiping (China) Li Lingwei	7–15, 8–15	(silver) Runner-up
1986	Chinese Taipei Open	(Indonesia) Verawaty Fadjrin	(Japan) Sumiko Kitada (Japan) Harumi Kohara	15–11, 15–8	(gold) Winner
1986	China Open	(Indonesia) Verawaty Fadjrin	(South Korea) Kim Yun-ja (South Korea) Yoo Sang-hee	15–8, 15–10	(gold) Winner
1986	Malaysia Open	(Indonesia) Verawaty Fadjrin	(China) Lin Ying (China) Wu Jianqiu	4–15, 8–15	(silver) Runner-up
1986	Indonesia Open	(Indonesia) Verawaty Fadjrin	(Indonesia) Rosiana Tendean (Indonesia) Imelda Wiguna	17–15, 15–2	(gold) Winner
1986	World Grand Prix Finals	(Indonesia) Verawaty Fadjrin	(South Korea) Chung Myung-hee (South Korea) Hwang Hye-young	10–15, 6–15	(silver) Runner-up
1987	Konica Cup	(Indonesia) Rosiana Tendean	(South Korea) Chung Myung-hee (South Korea) Hwang Hye-young	5–15, 4–15	(silver) Runner-up
1987	Indonesia Open	(Indonesia) Rosiana Tendean	(Indonesia) Verawaty Fadjrin (Indonesia) Susi Susanti	15–4, 17–16	(gold) Winner
1987	Hong Kong Open	(Indonesia) Rosiana Tendean	(South Korea) Chung So-young (South Korea) Kim Yun-ja	14–18, 15–11, 2–15	(silver) Runner-up
1990	French Open	(Indonesia) Verawaty Fadjrin	(South Korea) Chung Myung-hee (South Korea) Hwang Hye-young	2–15, 1–15	(silver) Runner-up

Mixed doubles
Year	Tournament	Partner	Opponent	Score	Result
1979	India Open	(Indonesia) Rudy Heryanto	(Indonesia) Kartono (Indonesia) Tjan So Gwan	9–15, 2–15	(silver) Runner-up
1983	Malaysia Open	(Indonesia) Christian Hadinata	(England) Martin Dew (England) Gillian Gilks	15–5, 10–15, 6–15	(silver) Runner-up
1983	Indonesia Open	(Indonesia) Christian Hadinata	(England) Martin Dew (England) Gillian Gilks	18–17, 15–9	(gold) Winner
1984	Indonesia Open	(Indonesia) Christian Hadinata	(England) Martin Dew (England) Gillian Gilks	15–12, 15–7	(gold) Winner
1988	U.S. Open	(Indonesia) Christian Hadinata	(China) Lee Xiong (China) Yang Xinfang	9–15, 15–0, 15–14	(gold) Winner
