= Zheng Yuli =

Chinese badminton player

Zheng Yuli 郑昱鲤
Personal information
- Born: 1963 (age 62–63) Fuzhou, Fujian, China

Sport
- Country: China
- Sport: Badminton
- Handedness: Right
- Event: Women's singles & doubles
Medal record
Women's badminton
Representing China
World Championships
Bronze medal – third place	1985 Calgary	Women's singles
Bronze medal – third place	1987 Beijing	Women's singles
World Cup
Bronze medal – third place	1982 Kuala Lumpur	Women's singles
Bronze medal – third place	1987 Kuala Lumpur	Women's singles
Uber Cup
Gold medal – first place	1986 Jakarta	Women's team
Gold medal – first place	1988 Kuala Lumpur	Women's team
Asian Games
Gold medal – first place	1986 Seoul	Women's team
Asian Championships
Gold medal – first place	1985 Kuala Lumpur	Women's singles
Bronze medal – third place	1985 Kuala Lumpur	Women's doubles

Zheng Yuli (Chinese: 郑昱鲤, born 1963) is a retired female badminton player from China.

== Career ==
She earned a bronze medal as a semifinalist at both the 1985 IBF World Championships and 1987 IBF World Championships in women's singles, dropping three set matches in each case to her compatriots Han Aiping and Li Lingwei respectively. She won women's singles at the Japan Open in 1984 and at the Denmark Open in 1984 and 1986. Zheng played on Uber Cup (women's international) championship teams for China in 1986 and 1988.

Since retiring from international competitions, Yuli has been living in Perth, Western Australia. She runs the An-Yu Badminton Academy.

== Achievements ==
=== World Championships ===
Women's singles
Year	Venue	Opponent	Score	Result
1985	Olympic Saddledome; Calgary, Canada	(China) Han Aiping	11–3, 3–11, 2–11	Bronze
1987	Capital Indoor Stadium; Beijing, China	(China) Li Lingwei	6–11, 11–8, 5–11	Bronze

=== World Cup ===
Women's singles
Year	Venue	Opponent	Score	Result
1982	Stadium Negara; Kuala Lumpur, Malaysia	(China) Song Youping	11–6, 5–11, 11–7	Bronze
1987	Stadium Negara; Kuala Lumpur, Malaysia	(China) Han Aiping	11–12, 5–11	Bronze

=== Asian Championships ===
Women's singles
Year	Venue	Opponent	Score	Result
1985	Stadium Negara; Kuala Lumpur, Malaysia	(China) Qian Ping	11–6, 12–9	Gold

Women's doubles
Year	Venue	Partner	Opponent	Score	Result
1985	Stadium Negara; Kuala Lumpur, Malaysia	(China) Qian Ping	(China) Liu Aizhen (China) He Yanling	15–12, 15–7	Bronze

=== Open tournaments ===
Women's singles
Year	Tournament	Opponent	Score	Result
1981	India Open	(India) Ami Ghia	11–4, 11–6	(gold) Winner

=== IBF Grand Prix ===
The World Badminton Grand Prix sanctioned by International Badminton Federation (IBF) from 1983 to 2006.

Women's singles
Year	Tournament	Opponent	Score	Result
1984	Japan Open	(China) Qian Ping	11–2, 7–11, 11–7	(gold) Winner
1984	Denmark Open	(England) Helen Troke	11–6, 11–7	(gold) Winner
1985	Denmark Open	(China) Wu Jianqiu	11–8, 8–11, 11–7	(gold) Winner
1985	Hong Kong Open	(China) Han Aiping	6–11, 2–11	(silver) Runner-up
1985	German Open	(China) Qian Ping	1–3, retired	(silver) Runner-up
1986	Denmark Open	(Denmark) Pernille Nedergaard	11–4, 11–3	(gold) Winner

Women's doubles
Year	Tournament	Partner	Opponent	Score	Result
1986	Denmark Open	(China) Gu Jiaming	(England) Gillian Clark (England) Gillian Gowers	15–9, 15–18, 16–17	(silver) Runner-up
1988	German Open	(China) Lao Yujing	(England) Gillian Clark (England) Gillian Gowers	15–8, 3–15, 15–4	(gold) Winner
1988	Swedish Open	(China) Lao Yujing	(China) Guan Weizhen (China) Lin Ying	4–15, 8–15	(silver) Runner-up
