= Li Lingwei =

Chinese badminton player

Li Lingwei 李玲蔚
Personal information
- Born: January 4, 1964 (age 62) Lishui, Zhejiang, China

Sport
- Country: China
- Sport: Badminton
- Handedness: Right
- Highest ranking: 1
- Current ranking: Now retired
Medal record
Women's badminton
Representing China
World Championships
Gold medal – first place	1983 Copenhagen	Women's singles
Gold medal – first place	1985 Calgary	Women's doubles
Gold medal – first place	1989 Jakarta	Women's singles
Silver medal – second place	1987 Beijing	Women's singles
Silver medal – second place	1987 Beijing	Women's doubles
Bronze medal – third place	1985 Calgary	Women's singles
World Cup
Gold medal – first place	1983 Kuala Lumpur	Women's doubles
Gold medal – first place	1984 Jakarta	Women's singles
Gold medal – first place	1985 Jakarta	Women's singles
Gold medal – first place	1986 Jakarta	Women's singles
Gold medal – first place	1986 Jakarta	Women's doubles
Gold medal – first place	1987 Kuala Lumpur	Women's singles
Gold medal – first place	1987 Kuala Lumpur	Women's doubles
Silver medal – second place	1981 Kuala Lumpur	Women's singles
Silver medal – second place	1988 Kuala Lumpur	Women's singles
Bronze medal – third place	1983 Kuala Lumpur	Women's singles
Bronze medal – third place	1984 Jakarta	Women's doubles
Bronze medal – third place	1985 Jakarta	Women's doubles
Asian Games
Silver medal – second place	1982 New Delhi	Women's singles
Gold medal – first place	1982 New Delhi	Women's team
Silver medal – second place	1986 Seoul	Women's singles
Gold medal – first place	1986 Seoul	Women's team
Uber Cup
Gold medal – first place	1984 Kuala Lumpur	Women's team
Gold medal – first place	1986 Jakarta	Women's team
Gold medal – first place	1988 Kuala Lumpur	Women's team

Li Lingwei (Chinese: 李玲蔚; pinyin: Lǐlíngwèi, born January 4, 1964) is a Chinese badminton player of the 1980s. She was elected as a member of the International Olympic Committee in 2012, and in December 2016, she was elected vice president of the Chinese Olympic Committee. Li is heavily involved in improving women’s participation and fair representation in sport.

== Early years ==
Born in Lishui, Zhejiang, China, on January 4, 1964, Li Lingwei weighed only 4 pounds (1.8 kg) at birth. Worried about Li’s health, her mother encouraged her to participate in non-contact sports such as badminton but Li indiscriminately loved sports. During her childhood, Li impressed everyone with sporting results such as finishing in first place in the 400-meter run. In 1975 the 11-year-old Li Lingwei was selected to the Zhejiang Provincial Badminton Team; five years later in 1980, she won the National Youth Badminton singles competition and the adult group's doubles championship. After that, she was selected to the national badminton team. In the national team she learned both physical and mental skills under coach Chen Fushou. She entered the 1981 Alba Quartz Badminton World Cup at 17 years of age, reaching her first international final.

== Career ==
=== Athletic career ===
A brilliant all-around player whose court coverage and net play were particularly impressive, she maintained a narrow won/lost edge on her teammate, rival, and sometimes doubles partner Han Aiping. They dominated international women's badminton during most of the 1980s, each winning the then biennial IBF World Championships (now known as BWF World Championships) twice, and winning the IBF World doubles, together, in 1985. They also led Chinese teams that perennially won the biennial Uber Cup (women's world team) competitions. Li won the singles crown at the IBF World Championships in 1983 and 1989. She won Silver at the 1987 World Championships and a Bronze medal at the 1985 World Championships. Li won over 40 open international titles around the world. Besides the three World Championship gold medals her major results included four gold medals in the World Grand Prix Finals, two All England Singles titles, and one All England Women’s Doubles title. Li was also part of the pioneer team which won the first Uber Cup for China in 1984. From 1984 to 1987 Li won four consecutive crowns at the Badminton World Cups in the women's singles event plus three titles in the women's doubles event in 1983, 1986 and 1987.

She retired in 1989, and was inducted into the Badminton Hall of Fame in 1998.

=== Coaching career ===
After retiring in 1989, Li entered the University of Hangzhou to transfer her skills from playing to coaching. In 1991 Li Ling Wei returned to China's national badminton team, serving as assistant coach of the national team and, starting in December 1994, as head coach of the women's team. She coached the Chinese women's badminton team that won the 1998 Uber Cup Championship. Over the course of her coaching career, Li cultivated top players such as Ye Zhaoying, Gong Zhichao, Gong Ruina and Dai Yun to follow in her footsteps.

=== Administrative career ===
Li is a strong advocate of women’s rights and has been heavily involved in improving women’s participation and fair representation in world sports bodies such as the BWF and the IOC. Li has stated that, “as women, we have to work harder because we have so many roles to play – mother, daughter or wife – so most of us are in a very challenging situation. We have to work harder than men, otherwise we can’t achieve our goals.” She believed that in comparison to other sports, “badminton is achieving a lot of positive goals, in women’s participation for example, and with equal prize money. And it is the same with participation at events." She became the vice-chair of the Women’s Commission of the BWF in 2009. Li has also been serving as the Deputy Chair of the International Relations Commission of the BWF. Despite being heavily involved with multiple associations, Li still found the time to work as the deputy director in the International Relations Department for the 2008 Beijing Olympic Games Organizing Committee (BOCOG) from 2003 to 2008.

On May 12, 2002, when she was Chinese Badminton Association Vice-President, Li was elected as IBF member of Council, becoming one of only three women in the council. During her tenure she was also admitted to a doctoral degree at Beijing Sport University, specializing in sociology. In 2003 Li was elected as a member of the 10th National Committee of the Chinese People's Political Consultative Conference and became the only member of the CPPCC National Committee to have been a badminton player. In the same year she was transferred to the Beijing Olympic Organizing Committee's Sports Department as a second-level project expert, and then transferred to the Beijing Olympic Organizing Committee's International Liaison Department. After the 2008 Beijing Olympic Games she was promoted to the deputy director of the China National Sports General Administration Table Tennis Badminton Management Center, and returned to the Chinese badminton team again after 10 years. In December 2010 Li became the deputy director of the Network Management Center of the State Sports General Administration of China, replacing the retired Gao Shenyang.

Li never competed in the Olympics because badminton did not become an Olympic sport until 1992. However, she was chosen as one of the five retired athletes to carry the Olympic flag during the opening ceremony of the 2008 Beijing Olympics. In July 2012, she was elected as a member of the International Olympic Committee, receiving 83 votes out of 94. IOC president Jacques Rogge presented her with an "IOC gold medal".

In March 2015 Li served as the director of the tennis sports management center and secretary of the Chinese Communist Party committee, from the official to the main hall level. On December 28, 2016, Li was elected as vice chairman of the Chinese Olympic Committee in the Plenary Session of this organisation.

On July 24, 2024, Li was elected as Executive Board member of the IOC.

== Achievements ==
=== World Championships ===
Women's singles
Year	Venue	Opponent	Score	Result
1989	Senayan Sports Complex, Jakarta, Indonesia	(China) Huang Hua	11–6, 12–9	Gold
1987	Capital Indoor Stadium, Beijing, China	(China) Han Aiping	12–10, 4–11, 7–11	Silver
1985	Olympic Saddledome, Calgary, Canada	(China) Wu Jianqiu	7–11, 9–12	Bronze
1983	Brøndbyhallen, Copenhagen, Denmark	(China) Han Aiping	11–8, 6–11, 11–7	Gold

Women's doubles
Year	Venue	Partner	Opponent	Score	Result
1987	Capital Indoor Stadium, Beijing, China	(China) Han Aiping	(China) Guan Weizhen (China) Lin Ying	7–15, 8–15	Silver
1985	Olympic Saddledome, Calgary, Canada	(China) Han Aiping	(China) Lin Ying (China) Wu Dixi	15–9, 14–18, 15–9	Gold

=== World Cup ===
Women's singles
Year	Venue	Opponent	Score	Result
1988	National Stadium, Bangkok, Thailand	(China) Han Aiping	11–5, 6–11, 0–11	Silver
1987	Stadium Negara, Kuala Lumpur, Malaysia	(China) Han Aiping	11–8, 11–8	Gold
1986	Istora Senayan, Jakarta, Indonesia	(China) Han Aiping	11–8, 11–3	Gold
1985	Istora Senayan, Jakarta, Indonesia	(Indonesia) Ivana Lie	11–3, 11–2	Gold
1984	Istora Senayan, Jakarta, Indonesia	(China) Han Aiping	10–12, 11–4, 11–7	Gold
1983	Stadium Negara, Kuala Lumpur, Malaysia	(China) Han Aiping	5–11, 1–11	Bronze
1981	Stadium Negara, Kuala Lumpur, Malaysia	(China) Chen Ruizhen	10–12, 11–2, 7–11	Silver

Women's doubles
Year	Venue	Partner	Opponent	Score	Result
1987	Stadium Negara, Kuala Lumpur, Malaysia	(China) Han Aiping	(China) Guan Weizhen (China) Lin Ying	15–10, 11–15, 15–5	Gold
1986	Istora Senayan, Jakarta, Indonesia	(China) Han Aiping	(Indonesia) Imelda Wiguna (Indonesia) Rosiana Tendean	15–7, 15–7	Gold
1985	Istora Senayan, Jakarta, Indonesia	(China) Han Aiping	(South Korea) Kim Yun-ja (South Korea) Yoo Sang-hee	11–15, 15–11, 3–15	Bronze
1984	Istora Senayan, Jakarta, Indonesia	(England) Gillian Gilks	(China) Lin Ying (China) Wu Dixi	3–15, 7–15	Bronze
1983	Stadium Negara, Kuala Lumpur, Malaysia	(China) Han Aiping	(China) Wu Jianqiu (China) Xu Rong	6–15, 15–8, 15–5	Gold

=== Asian Games ===
Women's singles
Year	Venue	Opponent	Score	Result
1986	Olympic Gymnastics Arena, Seoul, South Korea	(China) Han Aiping	6–11, 9–11	Silver
1982	Indraprastha Indoor Stadium; New Delhi, India	(China) Zhang Ailing	6–11, 8–11	Silver

=== International Tournaments (1 titles, 1 runners-up) ===
Women's singles
Year	Tournament	Opponent	Score	Result
1982	All England Open	(China) Zhang Ailing	4–11, 6–11	(silver) Runner-up
1982	Japan Open	(Japan) Fumiko Tōkairin	11–2, 11–2	(gold) Winner

=== IBF Grand Prix (28 titles, 7 runners-up) ===
The World Badminton Grand Prix sanctioned by International Badminton Federation (IBF) from 1983 to 2006.

Women's singles
Year	Tournament	Opponent	Score	Result
1983	Grand Prix Finals	(China) Han Aiping	11–0, 4–11, 11–4	(gold) Winner
1984	Indonesian Open	(China) Wu Jianqiu	11–7, 11–4	(gold) Winner
1984	Malaysian Open	(China) Wu Jianqiu	6–11, 11–8, 11–8	(gold) Winner
1984	All England Open	(China) Han Aiping	11–5, 11–8	(gold) Winner
1985	Indonesia Open	(China) Han Aiping	11–9, 11–8	(gold) Winner
1985	All England Open	(China) Han Aiping	7–11, 10–12	(silver) Runner-up
1985	Swedish Open	(China) Han Aiping	8–11, 11–8, 10–12	(silver) Runner-up
1985	Grand Prix Finals	(China) Han Aiping	11–3, 11–3	(gold) Winner
1986	Hong Kong Open	(China) Han Aiping	10–12, 11–8, 12–10	(gold) Winner
1986	Japan Open	(China) Han Aiping	4–11, 12–9, 12–9	(gold) Winner
1986	China Open	(China) Han Aiping	3–11, 6–11	(silver) Runner-up
1986	Grand Prix Finals	(China) Han Aiping	11–5, 11–3	(gold) Winner
1987	Indonesia Open	(China) Shi Wen	12–10, 11–6	(gold) Winner
1987	Malaysian Open	(China) Han Aiping	11–3, 2–11, 12–9	(gold) Winner
1987	Japan Open	(South Korea) Hwang Hye-young	11–3, 11–6	(gold) Winner
1987	Scandinavian Open	(China) Qian Ping	11–9, 11–6	(gold) Winner
1987	China Open	(China) Han Aiping	6–11, 11–5, 12–10	(gold) Winner
1987	Grand Prix Finals	(China) Han Aiping	11–8, 11–5	(gold) Winner
1988	Indonesian Open	(South Korea) Hwang Hye-young	11–5, 11–6	(gold) Winner
1988	China Open	(China) Huang Hua	11–1, 7–11, 11–9	(gold) Winner
1988	Thailand Open	(China) Huang Hua	3–11, 11–6, 11–6	(gold) Winner
1988	English Masters	(China) Han Aiping	4–11, 11–5, 12–9	(gold) Winner
1988	Denmark Open	(China) Han Aiping	11–7, 11–7	(gold) Winner
1988	Malaysian Open	(China) Han Aiping	7–11, 3–11	(silver) Runner-up
1989	All England Open	(Indonesia) Susi Susanti	11–8, 11–4	(gold) Winner
1989	Japan Open	(China) Huang Hua	11–4, 11–2	(gold) Winner
1989	French Open	(China) Zhou Lei	11–5, 11–3	(gold) Winner
1989	Swedish Open	(China) Sun Xiaoqing	11–8, 11–3	(gold) Winner

Women's doubles
Year	Tournament	Partner	Opponent	Score	Result
1985	Indonesian Open	(China) Han Aiping	(Indonesia) Ivana Lie (Indonesia) Rosiana Tendean	15–7, 15–8	(gold) Winner
1985	All England Open	(China) Han Aiping	(China) Wu Dixi (China) Lin Ying	15–7, 15–12	(gold) Winner
1985	Swedish Open	(China) Han Aiping	(China) Wu Jianqiu (China) Guan Weizhen	15–12, 15–6	(gold) Winner
1986	Hong Kong Open	(China) Han Aiping	(China) Guan Weizhen (China) Lao Yujing	18–15, 15–9	(gold) Winner
1986	Japan Open	(China) Han Aiping	(China) Wu Dixi (China) Lin Ying	4–15, 8–15	(silver) Runner-up
1987	Scandinavian Open	(China) Qian Ping	(China) Guan Weizhen (China) Lin Ying	1–15, 8–15	(silver) Runner-up
1989	French Open	(China) Chiu Mei Yin	(China) Zhou Lei (China) Sun Xiaoqing	9–15, 10–15	(silver) Runner-up

=== Invitation tournament (2 titles, 1 runners-up) ===
Women's singles
Year	Tournament	Opponent	Score	Result
1985	Malaysian Masters	(China) Han Aiping	6–11, 10–12	(silver) Runner-up
1988	Konica Cup	(China) Huang Hua	12–9, 11–6	Gold

Women's doubles
Year	Tournament	Partner	Opponent	Score	Result
1985	Malaysian Masters	(China) Han Aiping	(China) Wu Dixi (China) Lin Ying	5–15, 15–12, 15–12	(gold) Winner

== Personal honor ==
Li won the national award for " Best Athlete" in 1980 and the "Best International Athlete" title in 1985. She was awarded the title of "Sports Elite" and "International Sports Elite" in 1980 and 1985 respectively, and was awarded the "Sports Medal of Honor" by the State Sports Commission seven times. In addition, she has been selected as the "Top Ten National Athletes" for four consecutive times since 1984. In 1989 she was also named as one of China's outstanding athletes in the past 40 years since the founding of the People's Republic of China in 1949.

In terms of honors in the badminton world, Li was awarded the international badminton Distinguished Service Award, the "Outstanding Achievement Award" by the International Badminton Federation in 1994; and was inducted into the Badminton Hall of Fame 4 years later in 1998. Li was a torchbearer at the 2004 Athens Olympic Games and the 2008 Beijing Olympic Games. At the opening ceremony of the Beijing Olympic Games she was a flag bearer. For her Olympic involvement, the IOC honored her with the Women and Sport Award in March 2008.

She also received Medals of Honor of World Labor Day, and Women’s Day, in China.

For her coaching contributions, Li was named one of the National “Top 10 Coaches of the Year” in 1997 and 1998.

Li is a representative of the Ninth National People's Congress, a member of the Standing Committee of the Twelfth National People's Congress, and a member of the Tenth and Eleventh National People's Political Consultative Conference.
