= Elizabeth Latief =

Indonesian badminton player

Personal information
- Born: 27 March 1963 (age 63)

Sport
- Country: Indonesia
- Sport: Badminton
- Event: Women's singles and doubles
Medal record
Women's badminton
Representing Indonesia
World Cup
Bronze medal – third place	1987 Kuala Lumpur	Women's singles
Uber Cup
Silver medal – second place	1986 Jakarta	Women's team
Bronze medal – third place	1988 Kuala Lumpur	Women's team
Asian Games
Bronze medal – third place	1986 Seoul	Women's team
SEA Games
Gold medal – first place	1983 Singapore	Women's team
Gold medal – first place	1985 Bangkok	Women's singles
Gold medal – first place	1985 Bangkok	Women's team
Gold medal – first place	1987 Jakarta	Women's singles
Gold medal – first place	1987 Jakarta	Women's team
Silver medal – second place	1983 Singapore	Women's singles
Silver medal – second place	1985 Bangkok	Women's doubles

Elizabeth Latief (born 27 March 1963) is an Indonesian badminton player from the 80s era.

== Career ==
Latief is a semi-finalist 1987 Badminton World Cup after being defeated Li Lingwei. She won the 1987 Konica Cup in what is now the Singapore Open after beating Gu Jiaming from China in the final, and won Asian Badminton Championships 1987. In the 1983 SEA Games she won a silver medal after being defeated by compatriot Ivana Lie. In 1985 SEA Games in Thailand, she managed to avenge himself by defeating Ivana Lie and won gold in the women's singles, and the silver medal in the women's doubles paired with Verawaty Fadjrin lost to Rosiana Tendean and Imelda Wiguna. At the 1987 SEA Games, she won the gold medal by defeating her junior Susi Susanti. Latief is also trusted to strengthen the Uber Cup Indonesia team in 1984, 1986, and 1988. In the 1986 finals, Indonesia lost 2–3 to China.

== Personal life ==
After retiring from the player, Latief manages the OCTIS advertising business with her brother. In 2004 Ice collaborated with Susi Susanti to manage "Fontana Sport Massage and Reflexology" in Kelapa Gading, North Jakarta. Now it has branches in Sunter, Juanda, Bogor, Pantai Indah Kapuk, Kedoya, Serpong and Alam Sutera.

== Achievements ==
=== World Cup ===
Women's singles
Year	Venue	Opponent	Score	Result
1987	Stadium Negara; Kuala Lumpur, Malaysia	(China) Li Lingwei	5–11, 10–12	Bronze

=== SEA Games ===
Women's singles
Year	Venue	Opponent	Score	Result
1983	Singapore Badminton Hall, Singapore	(Indonesia) Ivana Lie	11–2, 11–4	Silver
1985	Chulalongkorn University Indoor Stadium; Bangkok, Thailand	(Indonesia) Ivana Lie	12–11, 12–11	Gold
1987	Kuningan Hall; Jakarta, Indonesia	(Indonesia) Susi Susanti	11–5, 11–9	Gold

Women's doubles
Year	Venue	Partner	Opponent	Score	Result
1985	Chulalongkorn University Indoor Stadium; Bangkok, Thailand	(Indonesia) Verawaty Fadjrin	(Indonesia) Rosiana Tendean (Indonesia) Imelda Wiguna	2–15, 4–15	Silver

=== International tournament (1 runner-up) ===
Women's singles
Year	Tournament	Opponent	Score	Result	Ref.
1982	Silver Bowl International	(Denmark) Nettie Nielsen	6–11, 12–11, 6–11	(silver) Runner-up	

=== Invitational tournament ===
Women's singles
Year	Tournament	Opponent	Score	Result	Ref.
1987	Konica Cup	(China) Gu Jiaming	1–11, 11–6, 11–6	Gold	
