= Kimiko Jinnai =

Japanese badminton player

Personal information
- Born: 12 March 1964 (age 62) Yatsushiro, Kumamoto, Japan
- Height: 1.68 m (5 ft 6 in)
- Weight: 58 kg (128 lb)

Sport
- Country: Japan
- Sport: Badminton
- Handedness: Right
- Event: Women's doubles

Women's doubles
- BWF profile
Medal record
Women's badminton
Representing Japan
Uber Cup
Bronze medal – third place	1990 Nagoya & Tokyo	Women's team
Asian Games
Silver medal – second place	1982 New Delhi	Women's team
Silver medal – second place	1986 Seoul	Women's team
Bronze medal – third place	1986 Seoul	Women's doubles
Bronze medal – third place	1990 Beijing	Women's team
Asian Cup
Silver medal – second place	1991 Jakarta	Women's doubles

Kimiko Jinnai (陣内 貴美子, Jinnai Kimiko; born 12 March 1964) is a Japanese badminton player, born in Yatsushiro, Kumamoto. She competed in women's doubles with teammate Hisako Mori at the 1992 Summer Olympics in Barcelona.

== Awards and nominations ==
Award	Year	Category	Result	Ref.
Asahi Sports Award	1981	Victory at the 1981 Uber Cup with the Japanese women's national team	Won	

== Achievements ==
=== Asian Games ===
Women's doubles
Year	Venue	Partner	Opponent	Score	Result
1986	Olympic Gymnastics Arena; Seoul, South Korea	(Japan) Sumiko Kitada	(China) Guan Weizhen (China) Lin Ying	2–15, 1–15	Bronze

=== Asian Cup ===
Women's doubles
Year	Venue	Partner	Opponent	Score	Result
1991	Istora Senayan; Jakarta, Indonesia	(Japan) Hisako Mori	(South Korea) Chung So-young (South Korea) Hwang Hye-young	13-15, 1-15	Silver

=== IBF World Grand Prix (1 title, 3 runners-up) ===
The World Badminton Grand Prix was sanctioned by the International Badminton Federation from 1983 to 2006.

Women's doubles
Year	Tournament	Partner	Opponent	Score	Result
1990	Japan Open	(Japan) Hisako Mori	(China) Lai Caiqin (China) Yao Fen	15–7, 9–15, 10–15	(silver) Runner-up
1991	Chinese Taipei Open	(Japan) Hisako Mori	(Indonesia) Erma Sulistianingsih (Indonesia) Rosiana Tendean	15–7, 18–17	(gold) Winner
1991	All England Open	(Japan) Hisako Mori	(South Korea) Chung So-young (South Korea) Hwang Hye-young	5–15, 3–15	(silver) Runner-up
1992	U.S. Open	(Japan) Hisako Mori	(Sweden) Lim Xiaoqing (Sweden) Christine Gandrup	4–15, 9–15	(silver) Runner-up

=== International tournaments (1 runner-up) ===
Women's doubles
Year	Tournament	Partner	Opponent	Score	Result
1981	Swedish Open	(Japan) Kazuko Takamine	(England) Nora Perry (England) Sally Podger	6–15, 6–15	(silver) Runner-up
