= Sumiko Kitada =

Japanese badminton player

Personal information
- Born: 31 March 1962 (age 64) Daitō, Osaka, Japan
- Height: 1.64 m (5 ft 5 in)
- Weight: 59 kg (130 lb)

Sport
- Country: Japan
- Sport: Badminton
- Handedness: Right
- Event: Women's singles and doubles
Medal record
Women's badminton
Representing Japan
Asian Games
Silver medal – second place	1982 New Delhi	Women's team
Silver medal – second place	1986 Seoul	Women's team
Bronze medal – third place	1982 New Delhi	Women's singles
Bronze medal – third place	1986 Seoul	Women's doubles

Sumiko Kitada (北田 スミ子, Kitada Sumiko; born 31 March 1962), later Sumiko Shiba (芝 スミ子, Shiba Sumiko), is a retired Japanese badminton player. After working at Shijonawate Junior College, Kitada played for Sanyo Electric Ltd. and won a bronze medal in the women's singles exhibition event at the 1988 Seoul Olympics. She is the eight-time Japanese national champion and doubles runner-up four times. She also finished third in the 1986 World Badminton Grand Prix Finals. In 2005, she was appointed as a member of the Nippon Badminton Association Strengthening Committee, and after serving as the head of the strengthening headquarters, she was appointed as the head of the national strengthening department in June 2015.

== Awards and nominations ==
Award	Year	Category	Result	Ref.
Asahi Sports Award	1981	Victory at the 1981 Uber Cup with the Japanese women's national team	Won	
Asahi Sports Award	1989	Winning the All Japan Championships eight times in women's singles	Won	

== Achievements ==
=== Olympic Games (exhibition) ===
Women's singles
Year	Venue	Opponent	Score	Result
1988	Seoul National University Gymnasium; Seoul, South Korea	(Denmark) Kirsten Larsen	11–4, 11–8	Bronze

=== Asian Games ===
Women's singles
Year	Venue	Opponent	Score	Result
1982	Indraprastha Indoor Stadium; New Delhi, India	(China) Zhang Ailing	11–8, 6–11, 1–11	Bronze

Women's doubles
Year	Venue	Partner	Opponent	Score	Result
1986	Olympic Gymnastics Arena; Seoul, South Korea	(Japan) Kimiko Jinnai	(China) Guan Weizhen (China) Lin Ying	2–15, 1–15	Bronze

=== IBF World Grand Prix ===
The World Badminton Grand Prix sanctioned by International Badminton Federation (IBF) from 1983 to 2006.

Women's singles
Year	Tournament	Opponent	Score	Result
1986	English Masters	(China) Yao Fen	11–1, 2–11, 0–11	(silver) Runner-up

Women's doubles
Year	Tournament	Partner	Opponent	Score	Result
1983	Swedish Open	(Japan) Shigemi Kawamura	(England) Jane Webster (England) Nora Perry	10–15, 8–15	(silver) Runner-up
1986	Chinese Taipei Open	(Japan) Harumi Kohara	(Indonesia) Ivana Lie (Indonesia) Verawaty Fadjrin	11–15, 8–15	(silver) Runner-up

=== International tournaments ===
Women's singles
Year	Tournament	Opponent	Score	Result
1982	Scandinavian Cup	(China) Qian Ping	2–11, 8–11	(silver) Runner-up
1982	Indonesia Open	(Indonesia) Verawaty Fadjrin	8–11, 10–12	(silver) Runner-up

=== IBF International ===
Women's doubles
Year	Tournament	Partner	Opponent	Score	Result
1983	German Open	(Japan) Shigemi Kawamura	(England) Helen Troke (England) Karen Chapman	15–10, 15–4	(gold) Winner
