= Kirsten Larsen =

Danish badminton player (born 1962)

Personal information
- Born: 14 March 1962 (age 64)

Sport
- Country: Denmark
- Sport: Badminton
Medal record
Women's badminton
Representing Denmark
World Cup
Bronze medal – third place	1980 Kyoto	Women's singles
Bronze medal – third place	1985 Jakarta	Women's singles
Bronze medal – third place	1986 Jakarta	Women's singles
Sudirman Cup
Bronze medal – third place	1989 Jakarta	Mixed team
European Championships
Gold medal – first place	1988 Kristiansand	Women's singles
Silver medal – second place	1986 Uppsala	Women's singles
Silver medal – second place	1980 Groningen	Women's doubles
Bronze medal – third place	1984 Preston	Women's singles
Bronze medal – third place	1984 Preston	Women's doubles
European Mixed Team Championships
Gold medal – first place	1980 Groningen	Mixed team
Gold medal – first place	1986 Uppsala	Mixed team
Gold medal – first place	1988 Kristiansand	Mixed team
Gold medal – first place	1990 Moscow	Mixed team
Silver medal – second place	1984 Preston	Mixed team
European Junior Championships
Gold medal – first place	1979 Mülheim an der Ruhr	Girls' singles
Gold medal – first place	1979 Mülheim an der Ruhr	Mixed team
Bronze medal – third place	1979 Mülheim an der Ruhr	Girls' doubles

Kirsten Larsen (born 14 March 1962) is a Danish retired badminton player.

== Career ==
Larsen won the All England final in 1987 in singles. She also won three bronze medals at the Badminton World Cup in 1980, 1985 and 1986 and a gold medal in 1988 European championships. She was also Danish champion in singles from 1981 to 1983 and again from 1986 to 1988, and she was called Lene Køppen's successor. Kirsten won the European Championships in singles in 1988 and became second in 1986. She also became Nordic Champion in singles in 1983, 1984, 1986, 1987 and 1988. Kirsten Larsen played for the national team 58 times from 1979 to 1990, and the 1990 European Championships was her last tournament.

In 2014, Larsen received the Women in Badminton Award by the Badminton World Federation, for her significant contribution towards the active participation of women in high-performance badminton.

== Achievements ==
=== World Cup ===
Women's singles
Year	Venue	Opponent	Score	Result
1980	Kyoto, Japan	(Japan) Hiroe Yuki	7–11, 5–11	Bronze
1985	Istora Senayan, Jakarta, Indonesia	(Indonesia) Ivana Lie	9–11, 11–6, 2–11	Bronze
1986	Istora Senayan, Jakarta, Indonesia	(China) Li Lingwei	6–11, 4–11	Bronze

=== European Championships ===
Women's singles
Year	Venue	Opponent	Score	Result
1984	Guild Hall, Preston, England	(England) Sally Podger	0–11, 11–6, 5–11	Bronze
1986	Fyrishallen, Uppsala, Sweden	(England) Helen Troke	12–9, 3–11, 2–11	Silver
1988	Badmintonsenteret, Kristiansand, Norway	(Denmark) Christina Bostofte	11–8, 11–2	Gold

Women's doubles
Year	Venue	Partner	Opponent	Score	Result
1980	Martinihal, Groningen, Netherlands	(Denmark) Pia Nielsen	(England) Nora Perry (England) Jane Webster	8–15, 13–15	Silver
1984	Guild Hall, Preston, England	(Denmark) Dorte Kjær	(England) Karen Beckman (England) Gillian Gilks	11–15, 9–15	Bronze

=== European Junior Championships ===
Girls' singles
Year	Venue	Opponent	Score	Result
1979	Carl Diem Halle; Mülheim an der Ruhr, West Germany	(Norway) Else Thoresen	11–2, 11–4	Gold

Girls' doubles
Year	Venue	Partner	Opponent	Score	Result
1979	Carl Diem Halle; Mülheim an der Ruhr, West Germany	(Denmark) Kirsten Meier	(England) Gillian Clark (England) Sally Leadbeater	9–15, 4–15	Bronze

=== IBF World Grand Prix ===
The World Badminton Grand Prix sanctioned by International Badminton Federation (IBF) from 1983 to 2006.

Women's singles
Year	Tournament	Opponent	Score	Result
1983	Canadian Open	(Canada) Denyse Julien	11–1, 11–1	(gold) Winner
1984	Dutch Open	(England) Helen Troke	11–4, 7–11, 10–12	(silver) Runner-up
1984	Thailand Open	(England) Helen Troke	5–11, 8–11	(silver) Runner-up
1985	Chinese Taipei Open	(England) Helen Troke	5–11, 2–11	(silver) Runner-up
1985	Japan Open	(China) Wu Jianqiu	7–11, 11–8, 7–11	(silver) Runner-up
1985	Dutch Open	(England) Jane Sutton	11–6, 11–8	(gold) Winner
1985	India Open	(England) Helen Troke	8–11, 8–11	(silver) Runner-up
1985	English Masters	(England) Gillian Gowers	11–5, 11–0	(gold) Winner
1985	Scandinavian Cup	(South Korea) Kim Yun-ja	4–11, 2–11	(silver) Runner-up
1986	Chinese Taipei Open	(England) Helen Troke	11–12, 11–6, 11–4	(gold) Winner
1986	Carlton Intersport Cup	(China) Yao Fen	7–11, 7–11	(silver) Runner-up
1987	Chinese Taipei Open	(England) Helen Troke	11–4, 5–11, 11–1	(gold) Winner
1987	All England Open	(China) Qian Ping	9–7 retired	(gold) Winner
1987	English Masters	(Denmark) Christina Bostofte	11–4, 11–8	(gold) Winner
1988	Chinese Taipei Open	(Denmark) Pernille Nedergaard	11–3, 6–11, 11–6	(gold) Winner
1987	Hong Kong Open	(China) Han Aiping	4–11, 8–11	(silver) Runner-up
1988	German Open	(China) Han Aiping	8–11, 9–11	(silver) Runner-up
1989	Scottish Open	(Denmark) Pernille Nedergaard	11–5, 11–1	(gold) Winner

Women's doubles
Year	Tournament	Partner	Opponent	Score	Result
1984	Dutch Open	(Denmark) Dorte Kjær	(England) Karen Beckman (England) Gillian Gilks	12–15, 10–15	(silver) Runner-up

=== IBF International ===
Women's singles
Year	Tournament	Opponent	Score	Result
1979	Czechoslovakian International	(England) Sally Leadbeater	12–9, 11–6	(gold) Winner
1980	Czechoslovakian International	(Denmark) Rikke V. Sørensen	7–11, 8–11	(silver) Runner-up
1982	German Open	(China) Wu Dixi	9–11, 3–11	(silver) Runner-up
1983	Taiwan Masters	(Chinese Taipei) Sherry Liu	11–3, 11–5	(gold) Winner
1983	German Open	(Denmark) Nettie Nielsen	12–11, 3–11, 4–11	(silver) Runner-up
1983	Japan Open	(China) Han Aiping	2–11, 4–11	(silver) Runner-up
1983	India Masters	(South Korea) Yoo Sang-hee	6–11, 1–11	(silver) Runner-up
1983	Holland Masters	(Indonesia) Ivana Lie	4–11, 10–12	(silver) Runner-up
1984	English Masters	(England) Helen Troke	11–1, 12–10	(gold) Winner
1984	Scottish Open (II)	(Denmark) Dorte Kjær	11–5, 11–4	(gold) Winner
1984	Dutch Masters	(China) Han Aiping	7–11, 0–11	(silver) Runner-up

Women's doubles
Year	Tournament	Partner	Opponent	Score	Result
1979	Czechoslovakian International	(Denmark) Charlotte Pilgaard	(England) Gillian Clark (England) Sally Leadbeater	9–15, 5–15	(silver) Runner-up
1980	Taiwan Masters	(Denmark) Lene Køppen	(England) Nora Perry (England) Jane Webster	5–15, 7–15	(silver) Runner-up

== Personal information ==
Larsen married the former Danish badminton player Steen Fladberg. Their son Rasmus Fladberg is also a professional badminton player.
