= 1982 Thomas Cup squads =

This article lists the squads for the 1982 Thomas Cup participating teams. The age listed for each player is on 10 May 1982 which was the first day of the tournament.

== Teams ==
=== China ===
Six players represented China in the 1982 Thomas Cup.

Name	DoB/Age
Han Jian	6 July 1956 (aged 25)
Chen Changjie	4 January 1959 (aged 23)
Sun Zhian	1956 (aged 25–26)
Yao Ximing	15 September 1956 (aged 25)
Luan Jin	20 July 1958 (aged 23)
Lin Jiangli	1958 (aged 23–24)

=== Denmark ===
Six players represented Denmark in the 1982 Thomas Cup.

Name	DoB/Age
Morten Frost	4 April 1958 (aged 24)
Steen Fladberg	11 October 1956 (aged 25)
Flemming Delfs	7 September 1951 (aged 30)
Claus Andersen	25 March 1951 (aged 31)
Steen Skovgaard	1950 (aged 31–32)
Jesper Helledie	9 May 1954 (aged 28)

=== England ===
Six players represented England in the 1982 Thomas Cup.

Name	DoB/Age
Nick Yates	1962 (aged 19–20)
Steve Baddeley	28 March 1961 (aged 21)
Ray Stevens	23 June 1951 (aged 30)
Mike Tredgett	5 April 1949 (aged 33)
Duncan Bridge	1958 (aged 23–24)
Martin Dew	16 October 1958 (aged 23)

=== Indonesia ===
Six players represented Indonesia in the 1982 Thomas Cup.

Name	DoB/Age
Liem Swie King	28 February 1956 (aged 26)
Lius Pongoh	3 December 1960 (aged 21)
Rudy Hartono	18 August 1949 (aged 32)
Christian Hadinata	11 December 1949 (aged 32)
Rudy Heryanto	19 October 1954 (aged 27)
Kartono	8 August 1954 (aged 27)

=== Japan ===
Six players represented Japan in the 1982 Thomas Cup.

Name	DoB/Age
Kinji Zeniya	13 March 1953 (aged 29)
Hiroyuki Hasegawa	19 January 1957 (aged 25)
Masao Tsuchida	9 September 1953 (aged 28)
Nobutaka Ikeda	1957 (aged 24–25)
Toshihiro Tsuji	1946 (aged 35–36)
Shokichi Miyamori	5 February 1958 (aged 24)

=== Malaysia ===
Eight players represented Malaysia in the 1982 Thomas Cup.

Name	DoB/Age
Misbun Sidek	17 February 1960 (aged 22)
Jalani Sidek	10 November 1963 (aged 18)
Razif Sidek	29 May 1962 (aged 19)
Saw Swee Leong	16 July 1955 (aged 26)
Ong Beng Teong	29 May 1962 (aged 19)
Soh Goon Chup	1958 (aged 23–24)
Ho Khim Soon	1957 (aged 24–25)
James Selvaraj	1 November 1950 (aged 31)
