= 1980 IBF World Championships – Mixed doubles =

Mixed doubles at the 1980 IBF World Championships
- Venue: Istora
- Location: Jakarta, Indonesia
- Dates: May 27, 1980 – June 1, 1980

Medalists
gold medal	Christian Hadinata; Imelda Wiguna	Indonesia
silver medal	Mike Tredgett; Nora Perry	England
bronze medal	Steen Fladberg; Pia Nielsen	Denmark
bronze medal	Steen Skovgaard; Lene Køppen	Denmark

The 1980 IBF World Championships were held in Jakarta, Indonesia in 1980. Following the results of the mixed doubles. (Note: Results of the first rounds incomplete.)

== Main stage ==
=== Section 1 ===
First round
(Indonesia) Christian Hadinata (Indonesia) Imelda Wiguna
(Netherlands) Herman Leidelmeijer (Netherlands) Joke van Beusekom
(England) Derek Talbot (England) Karen Chapman
(Japan) Shoichi Toganoo (Japan) Etsuko Toganoo
(Australia) Paul Kong (Australia) Audrey Swaby
(Sweden) Klaus Gunar Jonsson (Norway) Else Thoresen

Second round
(Indonesia) Christian Hadinata (Indonesia) Imelda Wiguna
(Netherlands) Herman Leidelmeijer (Netherlands) Joke van Beusekom
(England) Derek Talbot (England) Karen Chapman	15	11	15
(Japan) Shoichi Toganoo (Japan) Etsuko Toganoo	10	15	9
(Australia) Paul Kong (Australia) Audrey Swaby	15	15
(Sweden) Klaus Gunar Jonsson (Norway) Else Thoresen

Third round
(Indonesia) Christian Hadinata (Indonesia) Imelda Wiguna	15	15
(Netherlands) Herman Leidelmeijer (Netherlands) Joke van Beusekom	7	8
(England) Derek Talbot (England) Karen Chapman	15	15
(Australia) Paul Kong (Australia) Audrey Swaby	3	2

Quarterfinals
(Indonesia) Christian Hadinata (Indonesia) Imelda Wiguna	15	15
(England) Derek Talbot (England) Karen Chapman	5	8

=== Section 2 ===
First round
(Denmark) Steen Skovgaard (Denmark) Lene Køppen
(Indonesia) Bobby Ertanto (Indonesia) Tjan So Gwan
(New Zealand) Stephen Wilson (Australia) Susan Daly
(Canada) Paul Johnson (Canada) Claire Backhouse
(Australia) Mark Harry (Australia) Julie McDonald
'	(Netherlands) Rob Ridder (Netherlands) Marjan Ridder
(India) Partho Ganguli (India) Ami Ghia

Second round
(Denmark) Steen Skovgaard (Denmark) Lene Køppen
(Indonesia) Bobby Ertanto (Indonesia) Tjan So Gwan	15	15
(New Zealand) Stephen Wilson (Australia) Susan Daly	2	5
(Canada) Paul Johnson (Canada) Claire Backhouse	15	16	15
(Australia) Mark Harry (Australia) Julie McDonald	2	17	7
(Netherlands) Rob Ridder (Netherlands) Marjan Ridder	15	15
(India) Partho Ganguli (India) Ami Ghia	17	6

Third round
(Denmark) Steen Skovgaard (Denmark) Lene Køppen	15	15	15
(Indonesia) Bobby Ertanto (Indonesia) Tjan So Gwan	18	5	13
(Canada) Paul Johnson (Canada) Claire Backhouse	15	15
(Netherlands) Rob Ridder (Netherlands) Marjan Ridder

Quarterfinals
(Denmark) Steen Skovgaard (Denmark) Lene Køppen	15	15
(Canada) Paul Johnson (Canada) Claire Backhouse	4	5

=== Section 3 ===
First round
(England) Mike Tredgett (England) Nora Perry
(Netherlands) Richard Pal (Netherlands) Hanke de Kort
(Indonesia) Hadibowo (Indonesia) Ruth Damayanti
(Japan) Kinji Zeniya (Japan) Hiroe Yuki
(Scotland) Dan Travers (Switzerland) Liselotte Blumer
(Denmark) Svend Pri (Denmark) Anne Skovgaard

Second round
(England) Mike Tredgett (England) Nora Perry
(Netherlands) Richard Pal (Netherlands) Hanke de Kort
(Indonesia) Hadibowo (Indonesia) Ruth Damayanti	8	15	15
(Japan) Kinji Zeniya (Japan) Hiroe Yuki	15	12	7
(Scotland) Dan Travers (Switzerland) Liselotte Blumer	15	15
(Denmark) Svend Pri (Denmark) Anne Skovgaard	11	4

Third round
(England) Mike Tredgett (England) Nora Perry	15	15
(Netherlands) Richard Pal (Netherlands) Hanke de Kort	0	1
(Indonesia) Hadibowo (Indonesia) Ruth Damayanti	15	15
(Scotland) Dan Travers (Switzerland) Liselotte Blumer	2	8

Quarterfinals
(England) Mike Tredgett (England) Nora Perry	1515	15
(Indonesia) Hadibowo (Indonesia) Ruth Damayanti	6	10

=== Section 4 ===
First round
(Denmark) Steen Fladberg (Denmark) Pia Nielsen
(England) Steve Baddeley (England) Karen Bridge
(Canada) Raphi Kanchanaraphi (Canada) Wendy Carter
(Australia) Peter Cooper (Australia) Robyn Hobba
(Indonesia) Hariamanto Kartono (Indonesia) Theresia Widiastuti
(Scotland) Billy Gilliland (England) Barbara Sutton
(India) Vikram Singh (India) Amita Kulkarni

Second round
(Denmark) Steen Fladberg (Denmark) Pia Nielsen	15	11	15
(England) Steve Baddeley (England) Karen Bridge	10	15	10
(Canada) Raphi Kanchanaraphi (Canada) Wendy Carter	15	15
(Australia) Peter Cooper (Australia) Robyn Hobba	13	8
(Indonesia) Hariamanto Kartono (Indonesia) Theresia Widiastuti
(Scotland) Billy Gilliland (England) Barbara Sutton	15	15
(India) Vikram Singh (India) Amita Kulkarni	1	4

Third round
(Denmark) Steen Fladberg (Denmark) Pia Nielsen	15	15
(Canada) Raphi Kanchanaraphi (Canada) Wendy Carter	8	4
(Indonesia) Hariamanto Kartono (Indonesia) Theresia Widiastuti	15	17	15
(Scotland) Billy Gilliland (England) Barbara Sutton	17	16	10

Quarterfinals
(Denmark) Steen Fladberg (Denmark) Pia Nielsen	5	15	15
(Indonesia) Hariamanto Kartono (Indonesia) Theresia Widiastuti	15	4	5

== Final stage ==
Quarterfinals
1	(Indonesia) Christian Hadinata (Indonesia) Imelda Wiguna	15	15
8	(England) Derek Talbot (England) Karen Chapman	5	8
4	(Denmark) Steen Skovgaard (Denmark) Lene Køppen	15	15
5	(Canada) Paul Johnson (Canada) Claire Backhouse	4	5
3	(England) Mike Tredgett (England) Nora Perry	15	15
6	(Indonesia) Hadibowo (Indonesia) Ruth Damayanti	6	10
2	(Denmark) Steen Fladberg (Denmark) Pia Nielsen	5	15	15
7	(Indonesia) Hariamanto Kartono (Indonesia) Theresia Widiastuti	15	4	5

Semifinals
(Indonesia) Christian Hadinata (Indonesia) Imelda Wiguna	15	15
(Denmark) Steen Skovgaard (Denmark) Lene Køppen	11	6
(England) Mike Tredgett (England) Nora Perry	15	17
(Denmark) Steen Fladberg (Denmark) Pia Nielsen	8	14

Finals
(Indonesia) Christian Hadinata (Indonesia) Imelda Wiguna	15	15
(England) Mike Tredgett (England) Nora Perry	12	4
