= 1980 IBF World Championships – Men's doubles =

Men's doubles at the 1980 IBF World Championships
- Venue: Istora
- Location: Jakarta, Indonesia
- Dates: May 27, 1980 – June 1, 1980

Medalists
gold medal	Ade Chandra; Christian Hadinata	Indonesia
silver medal	Kartono; Rudy Heryanto	Indonesia
bronze medal	Flemming Delfs; Steen Skovgaard	Denmark
bronze medal	Misbun Sidek; Jalani Sidek	Malaysia

The 1980 IBF World Championships were held in Jakarta, Indonesia in 1980. Following the results of the men's doubles. (Note: Results of the first rounds incomplete.)

== Main stage ==
=== Section 1 ===
First round
(Indonesia) Ade Chandra (Indonesia) Christian Hadinata
(Canada) Raphi Kanchanaraphi (Canada) James McKee
(Japan) Masao Tsuchida (Japan) Yoshitaka Iino
(Denmark) Steen Fladberg (Denmark) Morten Frost
(Sweden) Bengt Fröman (Sweden) Thomas Kihlström
(Chinese Taipei) Huang Kin Tung (Chinese Taipei) Liu Hon Kah (Note: Names in the newspaper identified as Hui and Lin. Possible full names of the players can be for instance Liu Han-Chia, Liu Hon Kah or Huang Kin Tung, see also .)

Second round
(Indonesia) Ade Chandra (Indonesia) Christian Hadinata
(Canada) Raphi Kanchanaraphi (Canada) James McKee
(Japan) Masao Tsuchida (Japan) Yoshitaka Iino	15	9	15
(Denmark) Steen Fladberg (Denmark) Morten Frost	11	15	10
(Sweden) Bengt Fröman (Sweden) Thomas Kihlström	15	15
(Chinese Taipei) Huang Kin Tung (Chinese Taipei) Liu Hon Kah	2	8

Third round
(Indonesia) Ade Chandra (Indonesia) Christian Hadinata	15	15
(Canada) Raphi Kanchanaraphi (Canada) James McKee	1	3
(Japan) Masao Tsuchida (Japan) Yoshitaka Iino	15	10	17
(Sweden) Bengt Fröman (Sweden) Thomas Kihlström	9	15	15

Quarterfinals
(Indonesia) Ade Chandra (Indonesia) Christian Hadinata	15	15
(Japan) Masao Tsuchida (Japan) Yoshitaka Iino	6	2

=== Section 2 ===
First round
(Malaysia) Misbun Sidek (Malaysia) Jalani Sidek
(India) Partho Ganguli (India) Vikram Singh
(Australia) Paul Kong (Australia) Peter Cooper
(Socialist Federal Republic of Yugoslavia) Gregor Berden (Socialist Federal Republic of Yugoslavia) Stane Koprivsek
(England) Ray Stevens (England) Mike Tredgett
(Netherlands) Rob Ridder (Netherlands) Herman Leidelmeijer

Second round
(Malaysia) Misbun Sidek (Malaysia) Jalani Sidek	15	18
(India) Partho Ganguli (India) Vikram Singh	8	16
(Australia) Paul Kong (Australia) Peter Cooper	15	15
(Socialist Federal Republic of Yugoslavia) Gregor Berden (Socialist Federal Republic of Yugoslavia) Stane Koprivsek	3	5
(England) Ray Stevens (England) Mike Tredgett
(Netherlands) Rob Ridder (Netherlands) Herman Leidelmeijer

Third round
(Malaysia) Misbun Sidek (Malaysia) Jalani Sidek	15	15
(Australia) Paul Kong (Australia) Peter Cooper	4	7
(England) Ray Stevens (England) Mike Tredgett	8	18
(Netherlands) Rob Ridder (Netherlands) Herman Leidelmeijer	15	16	8

Quarterfinals
(Malaysia) Misbun Sidek (Malaysia) Jalani Sidek	15	15
(England) Ray Stevens (England) Mike Tredgett	9	11

=== Section 3 ===
First round
(Indonesia) Kartono (Indonesia) Rudy Heryanto
(Sweden) Stefan Karlsson (Sweden) Claes Nordin
(Canada) Pat Tryon (Canada) John Czich
(England) Derek Talbot (England) Kevin Jolly
(Japan) Nobutaka Ikeda (Japan) Mikio Ozaki
(New Zealand) Steve Wilson (Netherlands) Jacob van Selm

Second round
(Indonesia) Kartono (Indonesia) Rudy Heryanto
(Sweden) Stefan Karlsson (Sweden) Claes Nordin	15	15
(Canada) Pat Tryon (Canada) John Czich	9	11
(England) Derek Talbot (England) Kevin Jolly	15	15
(Japan) Nobutaka Ikeda (Japan) Mikio Ozaki	7	3
(New Zealand) Steve Wilson (Netherlands) Jacob van Selm

Third round
(Indonesia) Kartono (Indonesia) Rudy Heryanto	15	18
(Sweden) Stefan Karlsson (Sweden) Claes Nordin	13	13
(England) Derek Talbot (England) Kevin Jolly	18	15
(New Zealand) Steve Wilson (Netherlands) Jacob van Selm	15	8

Quarterfinals
(Indonesia) Kartono (Indonesia) Rudy Heryanto	15	15
(England) Derek Talbot (England) Kevin Jolly	1	2

=== Section 4 ===
First round
(Denmark) Flemming Delfs (Denmark) Steen Skovgaard
(Scotland) Billy Gilliland (Scotland) Dan Travers
(Malaysia) Razif Sidek (Malaysia) Ong Beng Teong
(Australia) Mark Harry (Germany) Bernd Wessels
(Mexico) Ricardo Jaramillo (Mexico) Jorge Palazuelos
(Norway) Vidar Meum (Norway) Terje Dag Osthassel

Second round
(Denmark) Flemming Delfs (Denmark) Steen Skovgaard
(Scotland) Billy Gilliland (Scotland) Dan Travers
(Malaysia) Razif Sidek (Malaysia) Ong Beng Teong	15	15
(Australia) Mark Harry (Germany) Bernd Wessels	8	4
(Mexico) Ricardo Jaramillo (Mexico) Jorge Palazuelos	15	15
(Norway) Vidar Meum (Norway) Terje Dag Osthassel	2	4

Third round
(Denmark) Flemming Delfs (Denmark) Steen Skovgaard	15	17
(Scotland) Billy Gilliland (Scotland) Dan Travers	11	14
(Malaysia) Razif Sidek (Malaysia) Ong Beng Teong	15	15
(Mexico) Ricardo Jaramillo (Mexico) Jorge Palazuelos	7	7

Quarterfinals
(Denmark) Flemming Delfs (Denmark) Steen Skovgaard	15	11	15
(Malaysia) Razif Sidek (Malaysia) Ong Beng Teong	8	15	4

== Final stage ==
Quarterfinals
1	(Indonesia) Ade Chandra (Indonesia) Christian Hadinata	15	15
8	(Japan) Masao Tsuchida (Japan) Yoshitaka Iino	6	2
4	(Malaysia) Misbun Sidek (Malaysia) Jalani Sidek	15	15
5	(England) Ray Stevens (England) Mike Tredgett	9	11
3	(Indonesia) Kartono (Indonesia) Rudy Heryanto	15	15
6	(England) Derek Talbot (England) Kevin Jolly	1	2
2	(Denmark) Flemming Delfs (Denmark) Steen Skovgaard	15	11	15
7	(Malaysia) Razif Sidek (Malaysia) Ong Beng Teong	8	15	4

Semifinals
(Indonesia) Ade Chandra (Indonesia) Christian Hadinata	15	15
(Malaysia) Misbun Sidek (Malaysia) Jalani Sidek	9	10
(Indonesia) Kartono (Indonesia) Rudy Heryanto	15	15
(Denmark) Flemming Delfs (Denmark) Steen Skovgaard	7	7

Finals
(Indonesia) Ade Chandra (Indonesia) Christian Hadinata	5	15	15
(Indonesia) Kartono (Indonesia) Rudy Heryanto	15	5	7
