= 1987 IBF World Championships – Men's doubles =

Men's doubles at the 1987 IBF World Championships
- Venue: Capital Indoor Stadium
- Location: Beijing, China
- Dates: May 18, 1987 – May 24, 1987

Medalists
gold medal	Li Yongbo; Tian Bingyi	China
silver medal	Jalani Sidek; Razif Sidek	Malaysia
bronze medal	Jens Peter Nierhoff; Michael Kjeldsen	Denmark
bronze medal	Park Joo-bong; Kim Moon-soo	South Korea

The 1987 IBF World Championships (World Badminton Championships) were held in Beijing, China, in 1987. Following the results of the men's doubles. (Note: Results of the first rounds incomplete.)

== Main stage ==
=== Section 1 ===
First round
(Malaysia) Jalani Sidek (Malaysia) Razif Sidek
(Denmark) Steen Fladberg (Denmark) Jan Paulsen

Second round
(Malaysia) Jalani Sidek (Malaysia) Razif Sidek
(Denmark) Steen Fladberg (Denmark) Jan Paulsen

Third round
(Malaysia) Jalani Sidek (Malaysia) Razif Sidek
(Denmark) Steen Fladberg (Denmark) Jan Paulsen

Quarterfinals
(Malaysia) Jalani Sidek (Malaysia) Razif Sidek	15	15
(Denmark) Steen Fladberg (Denmark) Jan Paulsen	8	7

=== Section 2 ===
First round
(South Korea) Park Joo-bong (South Korea) Kim Moon-soo
(Indonesia) Eddy Hartono (Indonesia) Hadibowo

Second round
(South Korea) Park Joo-bong (South Korea) Kim Moon-soo
(Indonesia) Eddy Hartono (Indonesia) Hadibowo

Third round
(South Korea) Park Joo-bong (South Korea) Kim Moon-soo
(Indonesia) Eddy Hartono (Indonesia) Hadibowo

Quarterfinals
(South Korea) Park Joo-bong (South Korea) Kim Moon-soo	15	15
(Indonesia) Eddy Hartono (Indonesia) Hadibowo	3	10

=== Section 3 ===
First round
(Denmark) Jens Peter Nierhoff (Denmark) Michael Kjeldsen
(Indonesia) Liem Swie King (Indonesia) Rudy Heryanto
(England) Nick Yates (England) Nigel Tier
(Thailand) Sawai Chanseorasmee (Thailand) Sakrapee Thongsari

Second round
(Denmark) Jens Peter Nierhoff (Denmark) Michael Kjeldsen
(Indonesia) Liem Swie King (Indonesia) Rudy Heryanto
(England) Nick Yates (England) Nigel Tier
(Thailand) Sawai Chanseorasmee (Thailand) Sakrapee Thongsari

Third round
(Denmark) Jens Peter Nierhoff (Denmark) Michael Kjeldsen	15	15
(Indonesia) Liem Swie King (Indonesia) Rudy Heryanto	8	13
(England) Nick Yates (England) Nigel Tier	18	15
(Thailand) Sawai Chanseorasmee (Thailand) Sakrapee Thongsari	17	9

Quarterfinals
(Denmark) Jens Peter Nierhoff (Denmark) Michael Kjeldsen	15	15
(England) Nick Yates (England) Nigel Tier	10	7

=== Section 4 ===
First round
(Sweden) Jan-Eric Antonsson (Sweden) Pär-Gunnar Jönsson
(South Korea) Lee Deuk-choon (South Korea) Lee Sang-bok
(Japan) Hiroshi Nishiyama (Japan) Shokichi Miyamori
(China) Li Yongbo (China) Tian Bingyi

Second round
(Sweden) Jan-Eric Antonsson (Sweden) Pär-Gunnar Jönsson
(South Korea) Lee Deuk-choon (South Korea) Lee Sang-bok
(Japan) Hiroshi Nishiyama (Japan) Shokichi Miyamori
(China) Li Yongbo (China) Tian Bingyi	15	15

Third round
(Sweden) Jan-Eric Antonsson (Sweden) Pär-Gunnar Jönsson	15	15
(South Korea) Lee Deuk-choon (South Korea) Lee Sang-bok	12	12
(Japan) Hiroshi Nishiyama (Japan) Shokichi Miyamori	10	3
(China) Li Yongbo (China) Tian Bingyi	15	15

Quarterfinals
(Sweden) Jan-Eric Antonsson (Sweden) Pär-Gunnar Jönsson	7	16
(China) Li Yongbo (China) Tian Bingyi	15	17

== Final stage ==
Quarterfinals
(Malaysia) Jalani Sidek (Malaysia) Razif Sidek	15	15
(Denmark) Steen Fladberg (Denmark) Jan Paulsen	8	7
(South Korea) Park Joo-bong (South Korea) Kim Moon-soo	15	15
(Indonesia) Eddy Hartono (Indonesia) Hadibowo	3	10
(Denmark) Jens Peter Nierhoff (Denmark) Michael Kjeldsen	15	15
(England) Nick Yates (England) Nigel Tier	10	7
(China) Li Yongbo (China) Tian Bingyi	15	17
(Sweden) Jan-Eric Antonsson (Sweden) Pär-Gunnar Jönsson	7	16

Semifinals
(Malaysia) Jalani Sidek (Malaysia) Razif Sidek	17	15
(South Korea) Park Joo-bong (South Korea) Kim Moon-soo	16	4
(Denmark) Jens Peter Nierhoff (Denmark) Michael Kjeldsen	4	4
(China) Li Yongbo (China) Tian Bingyi	15	15

Finals
(Malaysia) Jalani Sidek (Malaysia) Razif Sidek	2	15	9
(China) Li Yongbo (China) Tian Bingyi	15	8	15
