= 1989 IBF World Championships – Men's doubles =

Men's doubles at the 1989 IBF World Championships
- Venue: Istora Senayan
- Location: Jakarta, Indonesia
- Dates: 29 May – 4 June

Medalists
gold medal	Li Yongbo; Tian Bingyi	China
silver medal	Chen Hongyong; Chen Kang	China
bronze medal	Jalani Sidek; Razif Sidek	Malaysia
bronze medal	Rudy Gunawan; Eddy Hartono	Indonesia

The 1989 IBF World Championships were held in Jakarta, Indonesia, in 1989. Following are the results of the men's doubles.

== Main stage ==
=== Section 1 ===
First round
(China) Li Yongbo (China) Tian Bingyi	15	15
(Malaysia) Rahman Sidek (Malaysia) Soo Beng Kiang	6	7
(Indonesia) Joko Mardianto (Indonesia) Aryono Miranat	o.K.
(England) Stephen Baddeley (England) Martin Dew
(New Zealand) Philip Horne (New Zealand) Graeme Robson	15	15
(Poland) Janusz Czerwieniec (Poland) Grzegorz Olchowik	3	5
(Scotland) Kenny Middlemiss (Scotland) Dan Travers
(United States) Peter Baum (United States) Karl Knudsen
(Sweden) Pär-Gunnar Jönsson (Sweden) Jens Olsson	15	15
(Japan) Hiroki Eto (Japan) Yasumasa Tsujita	6	8
(Australia) Gordon Lang (Australia) Michael Scandolera
(India) Sushant Bora (India) Vimal Kumar
(Denmark) Jan Paulsen (Denmark) Henrik Svarrer	15	15
(Hong Kong) Tse Bun (Hong Kong) Yeung Yik Kei	4	7
(Netherlands) Uun Santosa (Netherlands) Rob Stalenhoef	6	3
(Thailand) Siripong Siripool (Thailand) Pramote Teerawiwatana	15	15

Second round
(China) Li Yongbo (China) Tian Bingyi	17	15
(Indonesia) Joko Mardianto (Indonesia) Aryono Miranat	14	9
(New Zealand) Philip Horne (New Zealand) Graeme Robson	9	11
(Scotland) Kenny Middlemiss (Scotland) Dan Travers	15	15
(Sweden) Pär-Gunnar Jönsson (Sweden) Jens Olsson	15	15
(Australia) Gordon Lang (Australia) Michael Scandolera	4	8
(Denmark) Jan Paulsen (Denmark) Henrik Svarrer	8	15	11
(Thailand) Siripong Siripool (Thailand) Pramote Teerawiwatana	15	8	15

Third round
(China) Li Yongbo (China) Tian Bingyi	15	15
(Scotland) Kenny Middlemiss (Scotland) Dan Travers	2	3
(Sweden) Pär-Gunnar Jönsson (Sweden) Jens Olsson	15	15
(Thailand) Siripong Siripool (Thailand) Pramote Teerawiwatana	11	7

Quarterfinals
(China) Li Yongbo (China) Tian Bingyi	15	15
(Sweden) Pär-Gunnar Jönsson (Sweden) Jens Olsson	8	8

=== Section 2 ===
First round
(Malaysia) Jalani Sidek (Malaysia) Razif Sidek	15	15
(Canada) Mike Butler (Canada) David Humble	4	4
(China) Huang Zhanzhong (China) Zheng Yumin	15	15
(Thailand) Mongkol Kamlaithong (Thailand) Surachai Makkasasithorn	5	9
(Denmark) Jesper Knudsen (Denmark) Jens Peter Nierhoff	15	15
(Bulgaria) Stanimir Boitchinov (Bulgaria) Pjuzant Kassabian	2	4
(Germany) Volker Eiber (Germany) Ralf Rausch	15	15
(Peru) Gustavo Salazar (Peru) Federico Valdez	10	4
(South Korea) Kim Moon-soo (South Korea) Sung Han-kuk	15	15
(France) Franck Panel (France) Stéphane Renault	1	5
(Finland) Mika Heinonen (Finland) Lasse Lindelöf	15	15
(Scotland) Jim Mailer (Switzerland) Hubert Müller	8	8
(Indonesia) Bobby Ertanto (Indonesia) Imay Hendra	15	15
(Japan) Eishi Kibune (Japan) Hiroshi Nishiyama	6	13
(Soviet Union) Igor Dmitriev (Soviet Union) Vitali Shmakov	15	14	5
(Sweden) Stellan Österberg (Sweden) Rikard Rönnblom	11	15	15

Second round
(Malaysia) Jalani Sidek (Malaysia) Razif Sidek	15	15
(China) Huang Zhanzhong (China) Zheng Yumin	12	2
(Denmark) Jesper Knudsen (Denmark) Jens Peter Nierhoff	15	15
(Germany) Volker Eiber (Germany) Ralf Rausch	4	7
(South Korea) Kim Moon-soo (South Korea) Sung Han-kuk	15	15
(Finland) Mika Heinonen (Finland) Lasse Lindelöf	5	4
(Indonesia) Bobby Ertanto (Indonesia) Imay Hendra	15	15
(Sweden) Stellan Österberg (Sweden) Rikard Rönnblom	10	3

Third round
(Malaysia) Jalani Sidek (Malaysia) Razif Sidek	15	15
(Denmark) Jesper Knudsen (Denmark) Jens Peter Nierhoff	8	3
(South Korea) Kim Moon-soo (South Korea) Sung Han-kuk	18	15
(Indonesia) Bobby Ertanto (Indonesia) Imay Hendra	13	3

Quarterfinals
(Malaysia) Jalani Sidek (Malaysia) Razif Sidek	15	15
(South Korea) Kim Moon-soo (South Korea) Sung Han-kuk	7	8

=== Section 3 ===
First round
(Hong Kong) Chan Chi Choi (Hong Kong) Chan Siu Kwong
bye
(Netherlands) Alex Meijer (Netherlands) Pierre Pelupessy	6	15	15
(Germany) Markus Keck (Germany) Stephan Kuhl	15	0	8
(Japan) Shuji Matsuno (Japan) Shinji Matsuura	15	15
(Norway) Øyvind Berntsen (Norway) Hans Sperre Jr.	4	4
(Malaysia) Cheah Soon Kit (Malaysia) Ong Beng Teong	10	15	15
(Canada) Mike Bitten (Canada) Bryan Blanshard	15	4	8
(Thailand) Chaiwat Chalermpusitarak (Thailand) Sawei Chanseorasmee
(India) Praveen Kumar (India) Manoj Kumar
(Myanmar) Maung Naing Myint (Myanmar) Tun Htein Win
(Pakistan) Mirza Ali Yar Beg (Pakistan) Tariq Farooq
(Bulgaria) Stojan Ivantchev (Bulgaria) Jeliazko Valkov
(Nepal) Pratap Adhikari (Nepal) Prakash Doj Rana
(South Korea) Choi Sang-bum (South Korea) Shon Jin-hwan	4	2
(Indonesia) Rudy Gunawan (Indonesia) Eddy Hartono	15	15

Second round
(Hong Kong) Chan Chi Choi (Hong Kong) Chan Siu Kwong	10	6
(Netherlands) Alex Meijer (Netherlands) Pierre Pelupessy	15	15
(Japan) Shuji Matsuno (Japan) Shinji Matsuura	18	15
(Malaysia) Cheah Soon Kit (Malaysia) Ong Beng Teong	14	3
(Thailand) Chaiwat Chalermpusitarak (Thailand) Sawei Chanseorasmee	15	15
(Myanmar) Maung Naing Myint (Myanmar) Tun Htein Win	7	8
(Bulgaria) Stojan Ivantchev (Bulgaria) Jeliazko Valkov	3	3
(Indonesia) Rudy Gunawan (Indonesia) Eddy Hartono	15	15

Third round
(Netherlands) Alex Meijer (Netherlands) Pierre Pelupessy	5	1
(Japan) Shuji Matsuno (Japan) Shinji Matsuura	15	15
(Thailand) Chaiwat Chalermpusitarak (Thailand) Sawei Chanseorasmee	0	1
(Indonesia) Rudy Gunawan (Indonesia) Eddy Hartono	15	15

Quarterfinals
(Japan) Shuji Matsuno (Japan) Shinji Matsuura	6	4
(Indonesia) Rudy Gunawan (Indonesia) Eddy Hartono	15	15

=== Section 4 ===
First round
(Chinese Taipei) Ger Shin-ming (Chinese Taipei) Yang Shih-jeng
(Bulgaria) Yasen Borisov (Bulgaria) Boris Lalov
(Denmark) Mark Christiansen (Denmark) Michael Kjeldsen	15	15
(Sri Lanka) Duminda Jayakody (Sri Lanka) Niroshan Wijekoon	4	3
(Scotland) Anthony Gallagher (Scotland) Kevin Scott
(Poland) Jerzy Dołhan (Poland) Jacek Hankiewicz
(China) Chen Hongyong (China) Chen Kang	15	15
(Finland) Robert Liljequist (Finland) Tony Tuominen	3	9
(Sweden) Peter Axelsson (Sweden) Mikael Rosén	11	18	15
(New Zealand) Kerrin Harrison (New Zealand) Glenn Stewart	15	15	8
(United States) Chris Jogis (United States) Benny Lee	15	15
(Austria) Heinz Fischer (Austria) Klaus Fischer	10	1
(Mauritius) Geenesh Dussain (Mauritius) Jean-Michel Duverge
(England) Darren Hall (England) Anders Nielsen
(South Korea) Lee Sang-bok (South Korea) Park Joo-bong
(France) Christophe Jeanjean (France) Pascal Pak

Second round
(Chinese Taipei) Ger Shin-ming (Chinese Taipei) Yang Shih-jeng	15	18
(Denmark) Mark Christiansen (Denmark) Michael Kjeldsen	9	13
(Scotland) Anthony Gallagher (Scotland) Kevin Scott	4	3
(China) Chen Hongyong (China) Chen Kang	15	15
(Sweden) Peter Axelsson (Sweden) Mikael Rosén	15	15
(United States) Chris Jogis (United States) Benny Lee	11	4
(Mauritius) Geenesh Dussain (Mauritius) Jean-Michel Duverge	2	2
(France) Christophe Jeanjean (France) Pascal Pak	15	15

Third round
(Chinese Taipei) Ger Shin-ming (Chinese Taipei) Yang Shih-jeng	10	3
(China) Chen Hongyong (China) Chen Kang	15	15
(Sweden) Peter Axelsson (Sweden) Mikael Rosén	15	15
(France) Christophe Jeanjean (France) Pascal Pak	5	6

Quarterfinals
(China) Chen Hongyong (China) Chen Kang	15	15
(Sweden) Peter Axelsson (Sweden) Mikael Rosén	5	9

== Final stage ==
Quarterfinals
(China) Li Yongbo (China) Tian Bingyi	15	15
(Sweden) Pär-Gunnar Jönsson (Sweden) Jens Olsson	8	8
(Malaysia) Jalani Sidek (Malaysia) Razif Sidek	15	15
(South Korea) Kim Moon-soo (South Korea) Sung Han-kuk	7	8
(Japan) Shuji Matsuno (Japan) Shinji Matsuura	6	4
(Indonesia) Rudy Gunawan (Indonesia) Eddy Hartono	15	15
(China) Chen Hongyong (China) Chen Kang	15	15
(Sweden) Peter Axelsson (Sweden) Mikael Rosén	5	9

Semifinals
(China) Li Yongbo (China) Tian Bingyi	15	15
(Malaysia) Jalani Sidek (Malaysia) Razif Sidek	10	9
(Indonesia) Rudy Gunawan (Indonesia) Eddy Hartono	11	7
(China) Chen Hongyong (China) Chen Kang	15	15

Finals
(China) Li Yongbo (China) Tian Bingyi	15	15
(China) Chen Hongyong (China) Chen Kang	3	12
