= 1980 IBF World Championships =

Tournament details
- Dates: 27 May – 1 June
- Edition: 2nd
- Level: International
- Venue: Istora Senayan
- Location: Jakarta, Indonesia

The 1980 IBF World Championships were held in Jakarta, Indonesia in 1980.

== Medalists ==
=== Medal table ===
* Host nation (Indonesia)

Rank	Nation	Gold	Silver	Bronze	Total
1	Indonesia*	4	4	3	11
2	England	1	1	1	3
3	Denmark	0	0	4	4
4	Japan	0	0	1	1
4	Malaysia	0	0	1	1
Totals (5 entries)		5	5	10	20

=== Events ===
Event	Gold	Silver	Bronze
Men's singles	(Indonesia) Rudy Hartono	(Indonesia) Liem Swie King	(Indonesia) Hadiyanto
Men's singles	(Indonesia) Rudy Hartono	(Indonesia) Liem Swie King	(Indonesia) Lius Pongoh
Women's singles	(Indonesia) Verawaty Wiharjo	(Indonesia) Ivana Lie	(Denmark) Lene Køppen
Women's singles	(Indonesia) Verawaty Wiharjo	(Indonesia) Ivana Lie	(Indonesia) Taty Sumirah
Men's doubles	(Indonesia) Ade Chandra (Indonesia) Christian Hadinata	(Indonesia) Kartono (Indonesia) Rudy Heryanto	(Denmark) Flemming Delfs (Denmark) Steen Skovgaard
Men's doubles	(Indonesia) Ade Chandra (Indonesia) Christian Hadinata	(Indonesia) Kartono (Indonesia) Rudy Heryanto	(Malaysia) Misbun Sidek (Malaysia) Jalani Sidek
Women's doubles	(England) Nora Perry (England) Jane Webster	(Indonesia) Verawaty Wiharjo (Indonesia) Imelda Wiguna	(England) Karen Bridge (England) Barbara Sutton
Women's doubles	(England) Nora Perry (England) Jane Webster	(Indonesia) Verawaty Wiharjo (Indonesia) Imelda Wiguna	(Japan) Yoshiko Yonekura (Japan) Atsuko Tokuda
Mixed doubles	(Indonesia) Christian Hadinata (Indonesia) Imelda Wiguna	(England) Mike Tredgett (England) Nora Perry	(Denmark) Steen Fladberg (Denmark) Pia Nielsen
Mixed doubles	(Indonesia) Christian Hadinata (Indonesia) Imelda Wiguna	(England) Mike Tredgett (England) Nora Perry	(Denmark) Steen Skovgaard (Denmark) Lene Køppen
