= Badminton at the 1979 SEA Games =

SEA Games event

- Venue: Gema Sumantri Hall
- Location: Jakarta, Indonesia
- Dates: 21 – 30 September 1979
- Nations: 5

Badminton at the 1979 SEA Games was held at Jakarta. Badminton events was held between 21 and 30 September 1979.

== Medal winners ==
Event	Gold	Silver	Bronze
Men's singles	Hastomo Arbi; Indonesia	Udom Luangpetcharaporn; Thailand	Lee Ah Ngo; Singapore
Men's singles	Hastomo Arbi; Indonesia	Udom Luangpetcharaporn; Thailand	Wong Shoon Keat; Singapore
Women's singles	Ivana Lie; Indonesia	Verawaty Wiharjo; Indonesia	Sirisriro Patama; Thailand
Women's singles	Ivana Lie; Indonesia	Verawaty Wiharjo; Indonesia	Thida Aye Nyo; Burma
Men's doubles	Bandid Jaiyen; Preecha Sopajaree; Thailand	Ade Chandra; Christian Hadinata; Indonesia	Sawei Chanseorasmee; Sarit Pisudchaikul; Thailand
Men's doubles	Bandid Jaiyen; Preecha Sopajaree; Thailand	Ade Chandra; Christian Hadinata; Indonesia	Misbun Sidek; Ong Teong Boon; Malaysia
Women's doubles	Imelda Wiguna; Verawaty Wiharjo; Indonesia	Theresia Widiastuti; Ruth Damayanti; Indonesia	Sirisriro Patama; Suleeporn Jittariyakul; Thailand
Women's doubles	Imelda Wiguna; Verawaty Wiharjo; Indonesia	Theresia Widiastuti; Ruth Damayanti; Indonesia	Thida Aye Nyo; Mya Lay Sein; Burma
Mixed doubles	Christian Hadinata; Imelda Wiguna; Indonesia	Kartono; Tjan So Gwan; Indonesia	Lee Ah Ngo; Juliana Lee; Singapore
Mixed doubles	Christian Hadinata; Imelda Wiguna; Indonesia	Kartono; Tjan So Gwan; Indonesia	Preecha Sopajaree; Jutatip Banjongsilp; Thailand
Men's team	Indonesia; Liem Swie King; Hastomo Arbi; Ade Chandra; Christian Hadinata; Rudy Heryanto; Kartono	Malaysia; Saw Swee Leong; James Selvaraj; Misbun Sidek; Ong Teong Boon; Ho Khim Soon; Kwek Chiew Peng	Thailand; Bandid Jaiyen; Udom Luangpetcharaporn; Surapong Suharitdamrong; Preecha Sopajaree; Sawei Chanseorasmee; Sarit Pisudchaikul
Women's team	Indonesia; Verawaty Wiharjo; Ivana Lie; Imelda Wiguna; Tjan So Gwan; Theresia Widiastuti; Ruth Damayanti	Thailand; Kanitta Mansamuth; Suleeporn Jittariyakul; Thongkam Kingmanee; Sirisriro Patama; Phanwad Jinasuyanont; Jutatip Banjongsilp	Malaysia; Khaw Mooi Eng; Katherine Teh; Clare Choo; Leong Chai Lean; Juliet Poon; Josephine Chia
Women's team	Indonesia; Verawaty Wiharjo; Ivana Lie; Imelda Wiguna; Tjan So Gwan; Theresia Widiastuti; Ruth Damayanti	Thailand; Kanitta Mansamuth; Suleeporn Jittariyakul; Thongkam Kingmanee; Sirisriro Patama; Phanwad Jinasuyanont; Jutatip Banjongsilp	Burma; Thida Aye Nyo; Mya Lay Sein; Khin Khin Aye; Kyaw Kyaw

== Semifinal results ==
Discipline	Winner	Runner-up	Score
Men's singles	(Thailand) Udom Luangpetcharaporn	(Singapore) Lee Ah Ngo	18–13, 15–7
Men's singles	(Indonesia) Hastomo Arbi	(Singapore) Wong Shoon Keat	15–10, 15–7
Women's singles	(Indonesia) Verawaty Wiharjo	(Myanmar) Thida Aye Nyo	11–1, 11–0
Women's singles	(Indonesia) Ivana Lie	(Thailand) Sirisriro Patama	11–4, 11–9
Men's doubles	(Thailand) Bandid Jaiyen & Preecha Sopajaree		
Men's doubles	(Indonesia) Ade Chandra & Christian Hadinata		
Women's doubles	(Indonesia) Ruth Damayanti & Theresia Widiastuti	(Thailand) Suleeporn Jittariyakul & Sirisriro Patama	18–15, 15–7
Women's doubles	(Indonesia) Verawaty Wiharjo & Imelda Wiguna	(Myanmar) Thida Aye Nyo & Mya Lay Sein	15–3, 15–8
Mixed doubles	(Indonesia) Christian Hadinata & Imelda Wiguna	(Singapore) Lee Ah Ngo & Juliana Lee Lay Eng	15–4, 15–6
Mixed doubles	(Indonesia) Kartono & Maria Fransisca	(Thailand) Jutatip Banjongsilp & Preecha Sopajaree	

== Final results ==
Discipline	Winner	Finalist	Score
Men's singles	(Indonesia) Hastomo Arbi	(Thailand) Udom Luangpetcharaporn	15–11, 15–4
Women's singles	(Indonesia) Ivana Lie	(Indonesia) Verawaty Wiharjo	11–8, 8–11, 12–9
Men's doubles	(Thailand) Bandid Jaiyen & Preecha Sopajaree	(Indonesia) Ade Chandra & Christian Hadinata	15–9, 15–5
Women's doubles	(Indonesia) Imelda Wiguna & Verawaty Wiharjo	(Indonesia) Ruth Damayanti & Theresia Widiastuti	15–4, 15–2
Mixed doubles	(Indonesia) Christian Hadinata & Imelda Wiguna	(Indonesia) Kartono & Maria Fransisca	18–16, 15–2

== Medal table ==
Rank	Nation	Gold	Silver	Bronze	Total
1	Indonesia (INA)	6	4	0	10
2	Thailand (THA)	1	2	5	8
3	Malaysia (MAS)	0	1	2	3
4	Myanmar (MYA)	0	0	3	3
4	Singapore (SGP)	0	0	3	3
Totals (5 entries)		7	7	13	27
