= Badminton at the 1985 SEA Games =

- Venue: Chulalongkorn University Indoor Stadium
- Location: Bangkok, Thailand
- Dates: 9 – 15 December
- Nations: 8

The Badminton at the 1985 SEA Games was held at the Indoor Stadium in Chulalongkorn University, Bangkok, Thailand. the Badminton was held between December 9 to December 15.

== Medals by event ==
Event	Gold	Silver	Bronze
Men's singles	Icuk Sugiarto; Indonesia	Eddy Kurniawan; Indonesia	Sompol Kukasemkij; Thailand
Men's singles	Icuk Sugiarto; Indonesia	Eddy Kurniawan; Indonesia	Ong Beng Teong; Malaysia
Women's singles	Elizabeth Latief; Indonesia	Ivana Lie; Indonesia	Darunee Lertvoralak; Thailand
Women's singles	Elizabeth Latief; Indonesia	Ivana Lie; Indonesia	Ladawan Mulasartsatorn; Thailand
Men's doubles	Razif Sidek; Jalani Sidek; Malaysia	Liem Swie King; Hariamanto Kartono; Indonesia	Sawai Chanseorasmee; Trirong Limsakul; Thailand
Men's doubles	Razif Sidek; Jalani Sidek; Malaysia	Liem Swie King; Hariamanto Kartono; Indonesia	Christian Hadinata; Chafidz Yusuf; Indonesia
Women's doubles	Rosiana Tendean; Imelda Wiguna; Indonesia	Verawaty Fadjrin; Elizabeth Latief; Indonesia	Jutatip Banjongsilp; Penpan Klangthamniem; Thailand
Women's doubles	Rosiana Tendean; Imelda Wiguna; Indonesia	Verawaty Fadjrin; Elizabeth Latief; Indonesia	Phanwad Jinasuyanont; Chitrad Chartrungsun; Thailand
Mixed doubles	Christian Hadinata; Imelda Wiguna; Indonesia	Hafidz Yusuf; Rosiana Tendean; Indonesia	Razif Sidek; Leong Choi Lean; Malaysia
Mixed doubles	Christian Hadinata; Imelda Wiguna; Indonesia	Hafidz Yusuf; Rosiana Tendean; Indonesia	Sawei Chanseorasmee; Jutatip Banjongsilp; Thailand
Men's team	Indonesia; Icuk Sugiarto; Eddy Kurniawan; Liem Swie King; Hariamanto Kartono; Christian Hadinata; Chafidz Yusuf	Malaysia; Chong Weng Kai; Chuah Han Khim; Foo Kok Keong; Ong Beng Teong; Jalani Sidek; Razif Sidek	Thailand; Sompol Kukasemkij; Sakrapee Thongsari; Sakchai Thanasriwanijai; Kriangsak Traiwekin; Sawei Chanseorasmee; Trirong Limsakul; Suvit Sampattanavorachai
Men's team	Indonesia; Icuk Sugiarto; Eddy Kurniawan; Liem Swie King; Hariamanto Kartono; Christian Hadinata; Chafidz Yusuf	Malaysia; Chong Weng Kai; Chuah Han Khim; Foo Kok Keong; Ong Beng Teong; Jalani Sidek; Razif Sidek	Singapore; Hamid Khan; Lau Wing Cheok; Wong Shoon Keat; Wong Shoon Soo; Benson Wong
Women's team	Indonesia; Ivana Lie; Elizabeth Latief; Sarwendah Kusumawardhani; Imelda Wiguna; Rosiana Tendean; Verawaty Fadjrin	Thailand; Jutatip Banjongsilp; Chitrad Chartrungsun; Phanwad Jinasuyanont; Penpan Klangthamniem; Darunee Lertvoralak; Ladawan Mulasartsatorn	Malaysia; Juliet Poon; Leong Chai Lean; Tan Sui Hoon; Kok Chan Fong; Tan Mei Chuan
Women's team	Indonesia; Ivana Lie; Elizabeth Latief; Sarwendah Kusumawardhani; Imelda Wiguna; Rosiana Tendean; Verawaty Fadjrin	Thailand; Jutatip Banjongsilp; Chitrad Chartrungsun; Phanwad Jinasuyanont; Penpan Klangthamniem; Darunee Lertvoralak; Ladawan Mulasartsatorn	Singapore; Choy Leng Seong; Koh Ee Boon; Irene Lee; Helen Lee; Ng Geok Khim

== Semifinal results ==
Discipline	Winner	Runner-up	Score
Men's singles	(Indonesia) Eddy Kurniawan	(Thailand) Sompol Kukasemkij	13–15, 15–9, 15–8
Men's singles	(Indonesia) Icuk Sugiarto	(Malaysia) Ong Beng Teong	15–5, 15–6
Women's singles	(Indonesia) Elizabeth Latief	(Thailand) Ladawan Mulasartsatorn	11–1, 11–7
Women's singles	(Indonesia) Ivana Lie	(Thailand) Darunee Lertvoralak	11–7, 11–2
Men's doubles	(Indonesia) Kartono & Liem Swie King	(Thailand) Sawei Chanseorasmee & Trirong Limsakul	15–4, 15–2
Men's doubles	(Malaysia) Razif Sidek & Jalani Sidek	(Indonesia) Christian Hadinata & Hafid Yusuf	15–10, 15–4
Women's doubles	(Indonesia) Rosiana Tendean & Imelda Wiguna	(Thailand) Jutatip Banjongsilp & Penpan Klangthamniem	15–0, 15–5
Women's doubles	(Indonesia) Verawaty Fadjrin & Elizabeth Latief	(Thailand) Chitrad Chartrungsun & Phanwad Jinasuyanont	15–3, 15–4
Mixed doubles	(Indonesia) Christian Hadinata & Imelda Wiguna	(Malaysia) Razif Sidek & Leong Choi Lean	15–4, 15–6
Mixed doubles	(Indonesia) Hafid Yusuf & Rosiana Tendean	(Thailand) Sawei Chanseorasmee & Jutatip Banjongsilp	15–9, 15–7

== Final results ==
Discipline	Winner	Finalist	Score
Men's singles	(Indonesia) Icuk Sugiarto	(Indonesia) Eddy Kurniawan	15–9, 15–6
Women's singles	(Indonesia) Elizabeth Latief	(Indonesia) Ivana Lie	12–11, 12–11
Men's doubles	(Malaysia) Razif Sidek & Jalani Sidek	(Indonesia) Kartono & Liem Swie King	6–15, 15–11, 15–5
Women's doubles	(Indonesia) Rosiana Tendean & Imelda Wiguna	(Indonesia) Verawaty Fadjrin & Elizabeth Latief	15–2, 15–4
Mixed doubles	(Indonesia) Christian Hadinata & Imelda Wiguna	(Indonesia) Hafid Yusuf & Rosiana Tendean	15–9, 15–5

== Men's team ==
=== Semifinals ===
Malaysia
3

9 December 1985

Thailand
2

		1	2	3
1	(Malaysia) (Thailand)
2	(Malaysia) (Thailand)
3	(Malaysia) (Thailand)
4	(Malaysia) (Thailand)
5	(Malaysia) (Thailand)

Indonesia
5

9 December 1985

Singapore
0

			1	2	3
1	(Indonesia) (Singapore)	Icuk Sugiarto; Hamid Khan	15; 9	15; 1
2	(Indonesia) (Singapore)	Eddy Kurniawan; Lau Wing Cheok	15; 9	15; 12
3	(Indonesia) (Singapore)	Liem Swie King / Hariamanto Kartono; Wong Shoon Keat / Wong Shoon Soo	15; 5	15; 3
4	(Indonesia) (Singapore)	Christian Hadinata / Chafidz Yusof; Hamid Khan / Lau Wing Cheok	15; 11	15; 12
5	(Indonesia) (Singapore)	Liem Swie King; Wong Shoon Soo	15; 7	15; 3

=== Gold medal match ===
Indonesia
5

11 December 1985

Malaysia
0

			1	2	3
1	(Indonesia) (Malaysia)	Icuk Sugiarto; Ong Beng Teong	15; 3	15; 12
2	(Indonesia) (Malaysia)	Eddy Kurniawan; Foo Kok Keong	15; 12	15; 8
3	(Indonesia) (Malaysia)	Liem Swie King / Hariamanto Kartono; Jalani Sidek / Razif Sidek	10; 15	15; 12	15; 11
4	(Indonesia) (Malaysia)	Christian Hadinata / Chafidz Yusof; Chong Weng Kai / Chuah Han Khim	15; 10	15; 8
5	(Indonesia) (Malaysia)	Liem Swie King; Chong Weng Kai	15; 8	15; 10
