= Badminton at the 1981 SEA Games =

- Venue: Camp Crame Gymnasium
- Location: Quezon City, Philippines
- Dates: 6 December – 15 December
- Nations: 6

Badminton events at the 1981 SEA Games were held at Camp Crame Gymnasium, Quezon City, Philippines, between 6 and 15 December.

== Medal winners ==
Event	Gold	Silver	Bronze
Men's singles	Liem Swie King; Indonesia	Hastomo Arbi; Indonesia	Misbun Sidek; Malaysia
Men's singles	Liem Swie King; Indonesia	Hastomo Arbi; Indonesia	Sarit Pisudchaikul; Thailand
Women's singles	Verawaty Fadjrin; Indonesia	Ivana Lie; Indonesia	Katherine Teh; Malaysia
Women's singles	Verawaty Fadjrin; Indonesia	Ivana Lie; Indonesia	Suleeporn Jittariyakul; Thailand
Men's doubles	Rudy Heryanto; Kartono; Indonesia	Jalani Sidek; Razif Sidek; Malaysia	Sigit Pamungkas; Icuk Sugiarto; Indonesia
Men's doubles	Rudy Heryanto; Kartono; Indonesia	Jalani Sidek; Razif Sidek; Malaysia	Sawei Chanseorasmee; Sarit Pisudchaikul; Thailand
Women's doubles	Ruth Damayanti; Verawaty Fadjrin; Indonesia	Theresia Widiastuti; Imelda Wiguna; Indonesia	Ho Kam Meng; Tay Hoe See; Singapore
Women's doubles	Ruth Damayanti; Verawaty Fadjrin; Indonesia	Theresia Widiastuti; Imelda Wiguna; Indonesia	Suleeporn Jittariyakul; Sirisriro Patama; Thailand
Mixed doubles	Rudy Heryanto; Imelda Wiguna; Indonesia	Sigit Pamungkas; Theresia Widiastuti; Indonesia	Razif Sidek; Leong Chai Lean; Malaysia
Mixed doubles	Rudy Heryanto; Imelda Wiguna; Indonesia	Sigit Pamungkas; Theresia Widiastuti; Indonesia	Preecha Sopajaree; Jutatip Banjongsilp; Thailand
Men's team	Indonesia; Liem Swie King; Hastomo Arbi; Sigit Pamungkas; Icuk Sugiarto; Rudy Heryanto; Kartono	Malaysia; Saw Swee Leong; Misbun Sidek; Ong Teong Boon; Moo Foot Lian; Jalani Sidek; Razif Sidek	Thailand; Bandid Jaiyen; Sawei Chanseorasmee; Sarit Pisudchaikul; Preecha Sopajaree; Suwat Poonumphai; Wichit Assavanapakas
Men's team	Indonesia; Liem Swie King; Hastomo Arbi; Sigit Pamungkas; Icuk Sugiarto; Rudy Heryanto; Kartono	Malaysia; Saw Swee Leong; Misbun Sidek; Ong Teong Boon; Moo Foot Lian; Jalani Sidek; Razif Sidek	Burma; Kyi Nyunt; Wai Nyunt; Maung Maung; Win Htut; Myint Han
Women's team	Indonesia; Verawaty Wiharjo; Ivana Lie; Imelda Wiguna; Taty Sumirah; Theresia Widiastuti; Ruth Damayanti	Thailand; Kanitta Mansamuth; Suleeporn Jittariyakul; Jutatip Banjongsilp; Sirisriro Patama; Amporn Kaitpituk; Penpan Klangthamniem	Malaysia; Leong Chai Lean; Katherine Teh; Juliet Poon; Kok Chan Fong
Women's team	Indonesia; Verawaty Wiharjo; Ivana Lie; Imelda Wiguna; Taty Sumirah; Theresia Widiastuti; Ruth Damayanti	Thailand; Kanitta Mansamuth; Suleeporn Jittariyakul; Jutatip Banjongsilp; Sirisriro Patama; Amporn Kaitpituk; Penpan Klangthamniem	Philippines; Diana Del Castillo; Leonora Rivera; Corazon Anuran; Rebecca Villegas; Go Giok Leng; Demetrin Santos

== Final results ==
Discipline	Winner	Finalist	Score
Men's singles	(Indonesia) Liem Swie King	(Indonesia) Hastomo Arbi	15–2, 15–7
Women's singles	(Indonesia) Verawaty Fadjrin	(Indonesia) Ivana Lie	6–11, 11–4, 11–7
Men's doubles	(Indonesia) Rudy Heryanto & Kartono	(Malaysia) Jalani Sidek & Razif Sidek	15–12, 15–6
Women's doubles	(Indonesia) Ruth Damayanti & Verawaty Fadjrin	(Indonesia) Theresia Widiastuti & Imelda Wiguna	15–13, 15–4
Mixed doubles	(Indonesia) Rudy Heryanto & Imelda Wiguna	(Indonesia) Sigit Pamungkas & Theresia Widiastuti	15–12, 15–5

== Medal table ==
Rank	Nation	Gold	Silver	Bronze	Total
1	Indonesia (INA)	7	4	1	12
2	Malaysia (MAS)	0	2	4	6
3	Thailand (THA)	0	1	6	7
4	Burma (BIR)	0	0	1	1
4	Philippines (PHI)	0	0	1	1
4	Singapore (SIN)	0	0	1	1
Totals (6 entries)		7	7	14	28
