= Maria Fransisca =

Indonesian badminton player (born 1959)

Personal information
- Born: Tjan So Gwan; 1959 Pasuruan, East Java, Indonesia
- Height: 1.57 m (5 ft 2 in)
- Weight: 58 kg (128 lb)

Sport
- Country: Indonesia
- Sport: Badminton
- Event: Women's singles & doubles
Medal record
Women's badminton
Representing Indonesia
World Masters Games
Gold medal – first place	2002 Melbourne	Women's doubles 40+
Gold medal – first place	2002 Melbourne	Mixed doubles 40+
Gold medal – first place	2005 Calgary	Women's doubles 45–49
Gold medal – first place	2009 Sydney	Mixed doubles 40+
World Senior Championships
Gold medal – first place	2007 Taipei	Mixed doubles 45+
Uber Cup
Silver medal – second place	1978 Auckland	Women's team
Asian Games
Silver medal – second place	1978 Bangkok	Women's team
Asian Championships
Bronze medal – third place	1983 Calcutta	Mixed doubles
Southeast Asian Games
Gold medal – first place	1979 Jakarta	Women's team
Gold medal – first place	1983 Singapore	Women's team
Gold medal – first place	1983 Singapore	Women's doubles
Silver medal – second place	1979 Jakarta	Mixed doubles

Maria Fransisca (born 1959; as Tjan So Gwan; 曾素光), is an Indonesian badminton player who played in the singles and doubles events.

== Career ==
In the beginning Fransisca was known as Tjan So Gwan (Chinese descent), and changed her name to Maria Fransiska (Her Baptismal Name) after received her Indonesian citizenship, take the oath in South Jakarta court in November 1980.

Fransisca started her career when she was trusted to strengthen the women's team at the 1978 Uber Cup women's team championship at that time Indonesia was the defending champion two years ago in the final Indonesia had to meet again with Japan's enemy she was expected to win points but failed by losing to Atsuko Tokuda 11 -5, 11–4. Finally, the Indonesian women's team failed and again lost to Japan.

At the India Open, Fransisca was able to present 3 titles from three sectors, namely the women's singles she won against her compatriot Ivana Lie in women's doubles, to team up with her again to fight the British women's doubles, and in the mixed doubles she and Hariamanto Kartono also succeeded defeating his fellow strugglers Rudy Heryanto and Ivana Lie, she managed to prove she was still reliable.

At the Indonesia Open, she also won a title by defeating the Chinese women's doubles and in the SEA Games event, she won a gold medal in women's doubles and women's team and one silver in mixed doubles.

== Achievements ==
=== World Masters Games ===
Women's doubles

Year	Age	Venue	Partner	Opponent	Score	Result
2002	40+	Melbourne, Australia	(China) Rong Kwok Xu	(New Zealand) Robyn MacFarlane (New Zealand) Lia Mapa		Gold
2005	40-44	Calgary, Canada	(Indonesia) Ruth Wihardjo	(Canada) Si-an Deng (Canada) Denyse Julien	5–15, 7–15	Silver
2005	45-49	Calgary, Canada	(Indonesia) Ruth Wihardjo	(Germany) Angelika Walter (Germany) Marlies Wessels	15–4, 15–0	Gold
2009	50+	Sydney Olympic Park Sports Centre, Sydney, Australia	(New Zealand) Margaret Lee	(Japan) Kumiko Yamamoto (Japan) Hiroki Yuyama	12–15, 13–15	Silver

Mixed doubles

Year	Age	Venue	Partner	Opponent	Score	Result
2002	40+	Melbourne, Australia	(Malaysia) Misbun Sidek	(Australia) Gordon Lang (Australia) Katrina Mirkovic		Gold
2009	50+	Sydney Olympic Park Sports Centre, Sydney, Australia	(Indonesia) Simbarsono Sutanto	(New Zealand) Jan Shew (New Zealand) Bruce Darby	15–13, 15–13	Gold

=== World Senior Championships ===
Mixed doubles

Year	Age	Venue	Partner	Opponent	Score	Result
2007	45+	Taipei Gymnasium, Taipei, Taiwan	(Indonesia) Simbarsono Sutanto	(England) Roger Taylor (England) Andi Stretch		Gold

=== Asian Championships ===
Mixed doubles
Year	Venue	Partner	Opponent	Score	Result
1983	Netaji Indoor Stadium, Calcutta, India	(Indonesia) Hadibowo	(South Korea) Park Joo-bong (South Korea) Kim Yun-ja	4–15, 5–15	Bronze

=== SEA Games ===
Women's doubles
Year	Venue	Partner	Opponent	Score	Result
1983	Singapore Badminton Hall, Singapore	(Indonesia) Ruth Damayanti	(Indonesia) Rosiana Tendean (Indonesia) Mary Harlim	3–15, 9–15	Gold

Mixed doubles
Year	Venue	Partner	Opponent	Score	Result
1979	Istora Senayan, Jakarta, Indonesia	(Indonesia) Kartono	(Indonesia) Christian Hadinata (Indonesia) Imelda Wiguna	16–18, 2–5	Silver

=== International tournaments (8 titles, 3 runners-up) ===
The World Badminton Grand Prix has been sanctioned by the International Badminton Federation from 1983 to 2006.

Women's singles
Year	Tournament	Opponent	Score	Result
1979	India Open	(Indonesia) Ivana Lie	1–11, 12–11, 12–10	(gold) Winner
1980	Auckland International	(Indonesia) Imelda Wiguna	9–11, 11–2, 11–6	(gold) Winner

Women's doubles
Year	Tournament	Partner	Opponent	Score	Result
1979	India Open	(Indonesia) Ivana Lie	(England) Karen Bridge (England) Paula Kilvington	15–9, 15–12	(gold) Winner
1980	Auckland International	(Indonesia) Imelda Wiguna	(Australia) Sue Daly (Indonesia) Taty Sumirah	15–2, 15–4	(gold) Winner
1982	Silver Bowl International	(Indonesia) Suzanne Ogeh	(Australia) Maxine Evans (Australia) Julie McDonald	15–2, 15–10	(gold) Winner
1982	Auckland International	(Indonesia) Suzanne Ogeh	(New Zealand) Robin Denton (New Zealand) Toni Whittaker		(gold) Winner
1983	Indonesia Open	(Indonesia) Ruth Damayanti	(China) Wu Jianqiu (China) Xu Rong	11–15, 15–11, 15–3	(gold) Winner
1983	India Open	(Indonesia) Ruth Damayanti	(South Korea) Kim Yun-ja (South Korea) Yoo Sang-hee	7–15, 12–15	(silver) Runner-up
1984	Chinese Taipei Open	(Indonesia) Ruth Damayanti	(England) Karen Beckman (England) Gillian Gilks	12–15, 15–9, 14–17	(silver) Runner-up
1984	Japan Open	(Indonesia) Ruth Damayanti	(England) Karen Beckman (England) Gillian Gilks	15–13, 3–15, 12–15	(silver) Runner-up

Mixed doubles
Year	Tournament	Partner	Opponent	Score	Result
1979	India Open	(Indonesia) Kartono	(Indonesia) Rudy Heryanto (Indonesia) Ivana Lie	15–9, 15–2	(gold) Winner
