= Jalani Sidek =

Malaysian badminton player (born 1964)

Personal information
- Nickname: Alan
- Born: Mohamed Jalani bin Mohd Sidek; 11 November 1964 (age 62) Banting, Selangor, Malaysia
- Years active: 1980–1994
- Height: 1.78 m (5 ft 10 in)
- Weight: 69 kg (152 lb; 10.9 st)

Sport
- Country: Malaysia
- Sport: Badminton
- Handedness: Right

Men's doubles
- Career title: 31
- Highest ranking: 1 (1989)
- BWF profile
Medal record
Representing Malaysia
Men's badminton
Olympic Games
Bronze medal – third place	1992 Barcelona	Men's doubles
World Championships
Silver medal – second place	1987 Beijing	Men's doubles
Bronze medal – third place	1980 Jakarta	Men's doubles
Bronze medal – third place	1989 Jakarta	Men's doubles
World Cup
Gold medal – first place	1990 Bandung/Jakarta	Men's doubles
Gold medal – first place	1991 Macau	Men's doubles
Silver medal – second place	1988 Bangkok	Men's doubles
Bronze medal – third place	1983 Kuala Lumpur	Men's doubles
Bronze medal – third place	1984 Jakarta	Men's doubles
Bronze medal – third place	1985 Jakarta	Men's doubles
Bronze medal – third place	1987 Kuala Lumpur	Men's doubles
Thomas Cup
Gold medal – first place	1992 Kuala Lumpur	Team
Silver medal – second place	1988 Kuala Lumpur	Team
Silver medal – second place	1990 Tokyo	Team
Silver medal – second place	1994 Jakarta	Team
Bronze medal – third place	1986 Jakarta	Team
Commonwealth Games
Gold medal – first place	1990 Auckland	Men's doubles
Asian Games
Silver medal – second place	1990 Beijing	Men's team
Bronze medal – third place	1990 Beijing	Men's doubles
Asian Championships
Gold medal – first place	1992 Kuala Lumpur	Men's doubles
Silver medal – second place	1985 Kuala Lumpur	Men's doubles
Silver medal – second place	1985 Kuala Lumpur	Men's team
Bronze medal – third place	1989 Shanghai	Men's team
Bronze medal – third place	1994 Shanghai	Men's doubles
Southeast Asian Games
Gold medal – first place	1985 Bangkok	Men's doubles
Gold medal – first place	1989 Kuala Lumpur	Men's team
Gold medal – first place	1991 Manila	Men's team
Silver medal – second place	1981 Manila	Men's doubles
Silver medal – second place	1981 Manila	Men's team
Silver medal – second place	1983 Singapore	Men's team
Silver medal – second place	1985 Bangkok	Men's team
Silver medal – second place	1989 Kuala Lumpur	Men's doubles
Silver medal – second place	1991 Manila	Men's doubles

Mohamed Jalani Mohd Sidek (born 11 November 1964) is a Malaysian former badminton player and coach.

== Personal life ==
He is the third eldest of the five Sidek brothers. Jalani and his siblings gained exposure about badminton sport from their father, Haji Mohammed Sidek. In addition, he is also one of the alumnus of Victoria Institution (batch 1977–1982).

Jalani was previously married to a Malaysian film producer, Raja Azmi (born 1959) of the Perak royal family on 23 December 1984 and the couple had three children namely Puteri Suraya (born 1987), Puteri Suhaida (born 1989) dan Megat Deli (born 1994). The couple filed a divorce and parted ways on 27 June 2012 after 27–28 years of their marriage. He later remarried to Zaleha Khalid in November 2013.

== Career ==
His regular partner is his elder brother, Razif. They made the nation sit up and take notice when they won the All England Championships in 1982 after beating the Scottish pair, Billy Gilliland and Dan Travers.

The Sidek brothers won almost every title on offer during their playing career, including the World Grand Prix, World Cup, SEA Games, Commonwealth Games and Asian Championships. They introduced the infamous “S” Service, which caused a deceptively erratic shuttle movement, which confounded their opponents and officials alike. The service caused much uproar and was eventually banned by the International Badminton Federation (IBF).

He was also a member of the Malaysian squad that won the Thomas Cup for the first time in 25 years, in a 3–2 victory over Indonesia at the National Stadium in 1992. He created history by becoming the first Malaysian athlete to win an Olympic Games medal in Barcelona 1992. They won a bronze medal for Malaysia after reaching the semi-finals in the men's doubles category where they lost to the Korean pair, Park Joo-bong and Kim Moon-Soo.

During his career with Razif, they become one of the best four doubles pair in the world (Park Joo-bong/Kim Moon-soo, Rudy Gunawan/Eddy Hartono and Tian Bingyi/Li Yongbo) from the 1980s until the early 1990s.

== Coaching ==
After he retired, he and his brothers established a badminton club to find talented new players, called Nusa Mahsuri, which he has been an advisor to since 1996. He was also responsible in grooming players like Ong Ewe Hock, Yong Hock Kin, Pang Chen and the Hashim brothers, Roslin and Hafiz to become world-class badminton players.

== Achievements ==
=== Olympic Games ===
Men's doubles
Year	Venue	Partner	Opponent	Score	Result
1992	Pavelló de la Mar Bella, Barcelona, Spain	(Malaysia) Razif Sidek	(South Korea) Kim Moon-soo (South Korea) Park Joo-bong	11–15, 13–15	Bronze

=== World Championships ===
Men's doubles
Year	Venue	Partner	Opponent	Score	Result
1980	Senayan Sports Complex, Jakarta, Indonesia	(Malaysia) Misbun Sidek	(Indonesia) Ade Chandra (Indonesia) Christian Hadinata	9–15, 10–15	Bronze
1987	Capital Indoor Stadium, Beijing, China	(Malaysia) Razif Sidek	(China) Li Yongbo (China) Tian Bingyi	2–15, 15–8, 9–15	Silver
1989	Senayan Sports Complex, Jakarta, Indonesia	(Malaysia) Razif Sidek	(China) Li Yongbo (China) Tian Bingyi	10–15, 9–15	Bronze

=== World Cup ===
Men's doubles
Year	Venue	Partner	Opponent	Score	Result
1983	Stadium Negara, Kuala Lumpur, Malaysia	(Malaysia) Razif Sidek	(South Korea) Kim Moon-soo (South Korea) Park Joo-bong	15–10, 5–15, 7–15	Bronze
1984	Istora Senayan, Jakarta, Indonesia	(Malaysia) Razif Sidek	(China) Li Yongbo (China) Tian Bingyi	9–15, 1–15	Bronze
1985	Istora Senayan, Jakarta, Indonesia	(Malaysia) Razif Sidek	(Indonesia) Hariamanto Kartono (Indonesia) Liem Swie King	14–17, 11–15	Bronze
1987	Stadium Negara, Kuala Lumpur, Malaysia	(Malaysia) Razif Sidek	(China) Li Yongbo (China) Tian Bingyi	6–15, 12–15	Bronze
1988	National Stadium, Bangkok, Thailand	(Malaysia) Razif Sidek	(China) Li Yongbo (China) Tian Bingyi	Walkover	Silver
1990	Istora Senayan, Jakarta, Indonesia	(Malaysia) Razif Sidek	(Indonesia) Rudy Gunawan (Indonesia) Eddy Hartono	14–17, 15–8, 15–7	Gold
1991	Macau Forum, Macau	(Malaysia) Razif Sidek	(South Korea) Kim Moon-soo (South Korea) Park Joo-bong	15–18, 15–11, 15–2	Gold

=== Asian Games ===
Men's doubles
Year	Venue	Partner	Opponent	Score	Result
1990	Beijing Gymnasium, Beijing, China	(Malaysia) Razif Sidek	(China) Li Yongbo (China) Tian Bingyi	5–15, 15–18	Bronze

=== Asian Championships ===
Men's doubles
Year	Venue	Partner	Opponent	Score	Result
1985	Stadium Negara, Kuala Lumpur, Malaysia	(Malaysia) Razif Sidek	(South Korea) Kim Moon-soo (South Korea) Park Joo-bong	5–15, 15–8, 2–15	Silver
1992	Cheras Indoor Stadium, Kuala Lumpur, Malaysia	(Malaysia) Razif Sidek	(China) Huang Zhanzhong (China) Zheng Yumin	15–4, 15–6	Gold
1994	Shanghai Gymnasium, Shanghai, China	(Malaysia) Razif Sidek	(China) Chen Hongyong (China) Chen Kang	8–15, 10–15	Bronze

=== Southeast Asian Games ===
Men's doubles
Year	Venue	Partner	Opponent	Score	Result
1981	Camp Crame Gymnasium, Manila, Philippines	(Malaysia) Razif Sidek	(Indonesia) Rudy Heryanto (Indonesia) Hariamanto Kartono	12–15, 6–15	Silver
1985	Chulalongkorn University Indoor Stadium, Bangkok, Thailand	(Malaysia) Razif Sidek	(Indonesia) Hariamanto Kartono (Indonesia) Liem Swie King	6–15, 15–11, 15–5	Gold
1989	Stadium Negara, Kuala Lumpur, Malaysia	(Malaysia) Razif Sidek	(Indonesia) Rudy Gunawan (Indonesia) Eddy Hartono	11–15, 12–15	Silver
1991	Camp Crame Gymnasium, Manila, Philippines	(Malaysia) Razif Sidek	(Indonesia) Rudy Gunawan (Indonesia) Eddy Hartono	11–15, 6–15	Silver

=== Commonwealth Games ===
Men's doubles
Year	Venue	Partner	Opponent	Score	Result
1990	Auckland Badminton Hall, Auckland, New Zealand	(Malaysia) Razif Sidek	(Malaysia) Cheah Soon Kit (Malaysia) Rashid Sidek	15–8, 15–8	Gold

=== IBF World Grand Prix (21 titles, 22 runners-up) ===
The World Badminton Grand Prix sanctioned by International Badminton Federation (IBF) since from 1983 to 2006.

Men's doubles
Year	Tournament	Partner	Opponent	Score	Result
1983	Canada Open	(Malaysia) Razif Sidek	(Canada) Mark Freitag (Canada) Bob MacDougall	15–3, 15–4	(gold) Winner
1983	Holland Masters	(Malaysia) Razif Sidek	(Indonesia) Rudy Heryanto (Indonesia) Hariamanto Kartono	4–15, 9–15	(silver) Runner-up
1984	Malaysia Open	(Malaysia) Razif Sidek	(South Korea) Kim Moon-soo (South Korea) Lee Deuk-choon	6–15, 15–12, 10–15	(silver) Runner-up
1984	Canada Open	(Malaysia) Razif Sidek	(Scotland) Billy Gilliland (Scotland) Dan Travers	15–11, 15–9	(gold) Winner
1985	Denmark Open	(Malaysia) Razif Sidek	(China) Li Yongbo (China) Tian Bingyi	14–17, 8–15	(silver) Runner-up
1985	Malaysia Open	(Malaysia) Razif Sidek	(England) Martin Dew (England) Dipak Tailor	18–16, 12–15, 15–3	(gold) Winner
1985	Malaysian Masters	(Malaysia) Razif Sidek	(China) Li Yongbo (China) Tian Bingyi	10–15, 7–15	(silver) Runner-up
1986	Chinese Taipei Open	(Malaysia) Razif Sidek	(South Korea) Kim Chung-soo (South Korea) Lee Deuk-choon	15–4, 15–5	(gold) Winner
1986	Japan Open	(Malaysia) Razif Sidek	(Indonesia) Bobby Ertanto (Indonesia) Rudy Heryanto	15–11, 15–2	(gold) Winner
1986	All England Open	(Malaysia) Razif Sidek	(South Korea) Kim Moon-soo (South Korea) Park Joo-bong	2–15, 11–15	(silver) Runner-up
1986	Hong Kong Open	(Malaysia) Ong Beng Teong	(Indonesia) Bobby Ertanto (Indonesia) Rudy Heryanto	7–15, 6–15	(silver) Runner-up
1986	Malaysia Open	(Malaysia) Razif Sidek	(Indonesia) Bobby Ertanto (Indonesia) Rudy Heryanto	15–10, 11–15, 15–10	(gold) Winner
1986	Indonesia Open	(Malaysia) Razif Sidek	(Indonesia) Hariamanto Kartono (Indonesia) Liem Swie King	3–15, 15–12, 12–15	(silver) Runner-up
1986	World Grand Prix Finals	(Malaysia) Razif Sidek	(Indonesia) Eddy Hartono (Indonesia) Hadibowo Susanto	10–15, 15–5, 18–13	(gold) Winner
1987	Malaysia Open	(Malaysia) Razif Sidek	(China) Li Yongbo (China) Tian Bingyi	Walkover	(gold) Winner
1987	English Masters	(Malaysia) Razif Sidek	(Japan) Shuji Matsuno (Japan) Shinji Matsuura	15–11, 15–9	(gold) Winner
1987	Denmark Open	(Malaysia) Razif Sidek	(Sweden) Jan-Eric Antonsson (Sweden) Pär-Gunnar Jönsson	15–11, 15–7	(gold) Winner
1988	All England Open	(Malaysia) Razif Sidek	(China) Li Yongbo (China) Tian Bingyi	6–15, 7–15	(silver) Runner-up
1988	French Open	(Malaysia) Razif Sidek	(South Korea) Park Joo-bong (South Korea) Sung Han-kuk	8–15, 15–12, 12–15	(silver) Runner-up
1988	Indonesia Open	(Malaysia) Razif Sidek	(China) Chen Hongyong (China) Chen Kang	16–18, 15–5, 15–2	(gold) Winner
1988	English Masters	(Malaysia) Razif Sidek	(China) Li Yongbo (China) Tian Bingyi	11–15, 4–15	(silver) Runner-up
1988	Denmark Open	(Malaysia) Razif Sidek	(China) Li Yongbo (China) Tian Bingyi	6–15, 15–8, 4–15	(silver) Runner-up
1988	Malaysia Open	(Malaysia) Razif Sidek	(China) Li Yongbo (China) Tian Bingyi	12–15, 12–15	(silver) Runner-up
1988	World Grand Prix Finals	(Malaysia) Razif Sidek	(Indonesia) Rudy Gunawan (Indonesia) Eddy Hartono	10–15, 15–6, 15–8	(gold) Winner
1989	Chinese Taipei Open	(Malaysia) Razif Sidek	(Sweden) Jan-Eric Antonsson (Sweden) Pär-Gunnar Jönsson	15–3, 15–2	(gold) Winner
1989	Malaysia Open	(Malaysia) Razif Sidek	(South Korea) Kim Moon-soo (South Korea) Park Joo-bong	12–15, 15–10, 7–15	(silver) Runner-up
1989	China Open	(Malaysia) Razif Sidek	(China) Huang Zhanzhong (China) Zheng Yumin	9–15, 17–14, 15–12	(gold) Winner
1989	Hong Kong Open	(Malaysia) Razif Sidek	(China) Chen Yu (China) He Xiangyang	15–12, 15–6	(gold) Winner
1989	Denmark Open	(Malaysia) Razif Sidek	(China) Li Yongbo (China) Tian Bingyi	10–15, 11–15	(silver) Runner-up
1989	Indonesia Open	(Malaysia) Razif Sidek	(Indonesia) Rudy Gunawan (Indonesia) Eddy Hartono	9–15, 7–15	(silver) Runner-up
1989	World Grand Prix Finals	(Malaysia) Razif Sidek	(China) Li Yongbo (China) Tian Bingyi	15–9, 15–5	(gold) Winner
1990	Swedish Open	(Malaysia) Razif Sidek	(China) Li Yongbo (China) Tian Bingyi	7–15, 9–15	(silver) Runner-up
1990	French Open	(Malaysia) Razif Sidek	(South Korea) Kim Moon-soo (South Korea) Park Joo-bong	3–15, 10–15	(silver) Runner-up
1990	Malaysia Open	(Malaysia) Razif Sidek	(South Korea) Kim Moon-soo (South Korea) Park Joo-bong	4–15, 15–13, 4–15	(silver) Runner-up
1990	Indonesia Open	(Malaysia) Razif Sidek	(Indonesia) Thomas Indracahya (Indonesia) Reony Mainaky	15–4, 15–5	(gold) Winner
1991	Chinese Taipei Open	(Malaysia) Razif Sidek	(Malaysia) Cheah Soon Kit (Malaysia) Soo Beng Kiang	15–7, 15–5	(gold) Winner
1991	Japan Open	(Malaysia) Razif Sidek	(South Korea) Kim Moon-soo (South Korea) Park Joo-bong	4–15, retired	(silver) Runner-up
1991	Malaysia Open	(Malaysia) Razif Sidek	(South Korea) Kim Moon-soo (South Korea) Park Joo-bong	8–15, 11–15	(silver) Runner-up
1991	Canada Open	(Malaysia) Razif Sidek	(Indonesia) Rexy Mainaky (Indonesia) Ricky Subagja	15–11, 15–12	(gold) Winner
1991	US Open	(Malaysia) Razif Sidek	(Indonesia) Rexy Mainaky (Indonesia) Ricky Subagja	18–13, 13–15, 15–3	(gold) Winner
1991	World Grand Prix Finals	(Malaysia) Razif Sidek	(China) Huang Zhanzhong (China) Zheng Yumin	15–10, 12–15, 18–15	(gold) Winner
1992	Chinese Taipei Open	(Malaysia) Tan Kim Her	(Malaysia) Cheah Soon Kit (Malaysia) Soo Beng Kiang	7–15, 4–15	(silver) Runner-up
1992	China Open	(Malaysia) Razif Sidek	(Indonesia) Rexy Mainaky (Indonesia) Ricky Subagja	15–17, 11–15	(silver) Runner-up

=== IBF International (3 titles, 2 runners-up) ===
Men's doubles
Year	Tournament	Partner	Opponent	Score	Result
1981	German Open	(Malaysia) Razif Sidek	(England) Duncan Bridge (England) Martin Dew	6–15, 15–11, 9–15	(silver) Runner-up
1982	All England Open	(Malaysia) Razif Sidek	(Scotland) Billy Gilliland (Scotland) Dan Travers	8–15, 15–9, 15–10	(gold) Winner
1983	German Open	(Malaysia) Razif Sidek	(England) Martin Dew (England) Mike Tredgett	15–8, 12–15, 8–15	(silver) Runner-up
1989	Singapore Open	(Malaysia) Razif Sidek	(Indonesia) Rudy Gunawan (Indonesia) Eddy Hartono	15–12, 15–8	(gold) Winner
1990	Australia Open	(Malaysia) Razif Sidek	(Indonesia) Hengky Irawan (Indonesia) Ardy Wiranata	15–8, 18–15	(gold) Winner

== Honours ==
- Malaysia:
  - Member of the Order of the Defender of the Realm (A.M.N.) (1983)
  - Herald of the Order of Loyalty to the Royal Family of Malaysia (B.S.D.) (1988)
  - Officer of the Order of the Defender of the Realm (K.M.N.) (1992)
- Selangor:
  - Companion of the Order of Sultan Salahuddin Abdul Aziz Shah (S.S.A.) (2001)
  - Recipient of the Meritorious Service Medal (P.J.K.) (1989)

== See also ==
- Misbun Sidek
- Razif Sidek
- Rahman Sidek
- Rashid Sidek
