= Christian Hadinata =

Indonesian badminton player (born 1949)

Personal information
- Born: Tjhie Beng Go'at; 11 December 1949 (age 76) Purwokerto, Banyumas, Central Java, Indonesia

Sport
- Country: Indonesia
- Sport: Badminton
- Handedness: Right

Men's & mixed doubles
- Highest ranking: 1 (XD with Imelda Wiguna in 1979)
Medal record
Men's badminton
Representing Indonesia
World Championships
| Gold medal – first place | 1980 Jakarta | Men's doubles |
| Gold medal – first place | 1980 Jakarta | Mixed doubles |
| Silver medal – second place | 1977 Malmö | Men's doubles |
| Bronze medal – third place | 1983 Copenhagen | Men's doubles |
World Games
| Bronze medal – third place | 1981 Santa Clara | Mixed doubles |
World Cup
| Gold medal – first place | 1979 Tokyo | Men's doubles |
| Gold medal – first place | 1980 Kyoto | Men's doubles |
| Gold medal – first place | 1985 Jakarta | Mixed doubles |
| Silver medal – second place | 1983 Kuala Lumpur | Mixed doubles |
| Silver medal – second place | 1983 Kuala Lumpur | Men's doubles |
| Silver medal – second place | 1984 Jakarta | Mixed doubles |
| Bronze medal – third place | 1984 Jakarta | Men's doubles |
Thomas Cup
| Gold medal – first place | 1973 Jakarta | Men's team |
| Gold medal – first place | 1976 Bangkok | Men's team |
| Gold medal – first place | 1979 Jakarta | Men's team |
| Gold medal – first place | 1984 Kuala Lumpur | Men's team |
| Silver medal – second place | 1982 London | Men's team |
| Silver medal – second place | 1986 Jakarta | Men's team |
Asian Games
| Gold medal – first place | 1974 Tehran | Mixed doubles |
| Gold medal – first place | 1978 Bangkok | Men's team |
| Gold medal – first place | 1978 Bangkok | Men's doubles |
| Gold medal – first place | 1982 New Delhi | Men's doubles |
| Gold medal – first place | 1982 New Delhi | Mixed doubles |
| Silver medal – second place | 1974 Tehran | Men's team |
| Silver medal – second place | 1974 Tehran | Men's doubles |
| Silver medal – second place | 1982 New Delhi | Men's team |
| Bronze medal – third place | 1978 Bangkok | Mixed doubles |
| Bronze medal – third place | 1986 Seoul | Men's team |
Asian Championships
| Gold medal – first place | 1971 Jakarta | Mixed doubles |
| Gold medal – first place | 1971 Jakarta | Men's team |
| Bronze medal – third place | 1971 Jakarta | Men's doubles |
SEA Games
| Gold medal – first place | 1977 Kuala Lumpur | Mixed doubles |
| Gold medal – first place | 1977 Kuala Lumpur | Men's team |
| Gold medal – first place | 1979 Jakarta | Men's team |
| Gold medal – first place | 1979 Jakarta | Mixed doubles |
| Gold medal – first place | 1983 Singapore | Men's doubles |
| Gold medal – first place | 1983 Singapore | Mixed doubles |
| Gold medal – first place | 1983 Singapore | Men's team |
| Gold medal – first place | 1985 Bangkok | Mixed doubles |
| Gold medal – first place | 1985 Bangkok | Men's team |
| Silver medal – second place | 1979 Jakarta | Men's doubles |
| Bronze medal – third place | 1985 Bangkok | Men's doubles |

Christian Hadinata (Chinese: 紀明發; born 11 December 1949) is an Indonesian former badminton player and coach.

== Profile ==
Though early in his career he was a fine singles player who reached the final of the prestigious All-England Championship in 1973, Christian's success in doubles earned him recognition as one of the great doubles players in badminton history. He won two gold medals at the 1980 IBF World Championships in Jakarta, in men's doubles with Ade Chandra, and in mixed doubles with Imelda Wiguna. He played for Indonesia for 15 years, beginning his career in 1971 at the Asian championships in Indonesia and managed to become a mixed doubles champion with Retno Koestijah. Christian's Thomas Cup (Men's International Team Championship) record is particularly notable. Playing in six consecutive campaigns from 1973 to 1986, and with a variety of doubles partners, he dropped only one match, helping Indonesia capture the cup on four occasions (1973, 1976, 1979, 1984). In 2001 he was inducted into the World Badminton Hall of Fame.

=== Personal life ===
His wife is Yoke Anwar and they have two children. People affectionately call him Ko Ko Chris (Ko Ko meaning big brother in Hokkien).

=== Career Coach ===
- Indonesian badminton player (1971–1986)
- Indonesian badminton coach (began in 1985)
- Director National Training PBSI (Indonesia Badminton Association)

== Awards and nominations ==
| Award | Year | Category | Result | Ref. |
|---|---|---|---|---|
| International Badminton Federation Awards | 2001 | Badminton Hall of Fame | Honored | |
| Indonesian Sport Awards | 2018 | Lifetime Achievement Award | Honored | |

== Achievements ==
=== Olympic Games (demonstration) ===
Men's doubles
| Year | Venue | Partner | Opponent | Score | Result |
|---|---|---|---|---|---|
| 1972 | Volleyballhalle, Munich, West Germany | (Indonesia) Ade Chandra | (Malaysia) Punch Gunalan (Malaysia) Ng Boon Bee | 15–4, 2–15, 15–11 | Gold |

Mixed doubles
| Year | Venue | Partner | Opponent | Score | Result |
|---|---|---|---|---|---|
| 1972 | Volleyballhalle, Munich, West Germany | (Indonesia) Utami Dewi | (Denmark) Svend Pri (Denmark) Ulla Strand | 12–15, 10–15 | Bronze |

=== World Games ===
Mixed doubles
| Year | Venue | Partner | Opponent | Score | Result |
|---|---|---|---|---|---|
| 1981 | San Jose Civic Auditorium, California, United States | (Indonesia) Imelda Wiguna | (Sweden) Thomas Kihlström (United Kingdom) Gillian Gilks | 8–15, 8–15 | Bronze |

=== World Championships ===
Men's doubles
| Year | Venue | Partner | Opponent | Score | Result |
|---|---|---|---|---|---|
| 1977 | Malmö Isstadion, Malmö, Sweden | (Indonesia) Ade Chandra | (Indonesia) Tjun Tjun (Indonesia) Johan Wahjudi | 6–15, 4–15 | Silver |
| 1980 | Istora Senayan, Jakarta, Indonesia | (Indonesia) Ade Chandra | (Indonesia) Rudy Heryanto (Indonesia) Kartono | 5–15, 15–5, 15–7 | Gold |
| 1983 | Brøndbyhallen, Copenhagen, Denmark | (Indonesia) Bobby Ertanto | (Denmark) Steen Fladberg (Denmark) Jesper Helledie | 16–18, 11–15 | Bronze |

Mixed doubles
| Year | Venue | Partner | Opponent | Score | Result |
|---|---|---|---|---|---|
| 1980 | Istora Senayan, Jakarta, Indonesia | (Indonesia) Imelda Wiguna | (England) Mike Tredgett (England) Nora Perry | 15–12, 15–4 | Gold |

=== World Cup ===
Men's doubles
| Year | Venue | Partner | Opponent | Score | Result |
|---|---|---|---|---|---|
| 1979 | Tokyo, Japan | (Indonesia) Ade Chandra | (Japan) Yoshitaka Iino (Japan) Masao Tsuchida | 15–8, 15–3 | Gold |
| 1980 | Kyoto, Japan | (Indonesia) Ade Chandra | (Denmark) Flemming Delfs (Denmark) Steen Skovgaard | 15–6, 15–3 | Gold |
| 1983 | Stadium Negara, Kuala Lumpur, Malaysia | (Indonesia) Bobby Ertanto | (South Korea) Kim Moon-soo (South Korea) Park Joo-bong | 6–15, 11–15 | Silver |
| 1984 | Istora Senayan, Jakarta, Indonesia | (Indonesia) Hadibowo | (Indonesia) Kartono (Indonesia) Liem Swie King | 13–15, 10–15 | Bronze |

Mixed doubles
| Year | Venue | Partner | Opponent | Score | Result |
|---|---|---|---|---|---|
| 1983 | Stadium Negara, Kuala Lumpur, Malaysia | (Indonesia) Ivana Lie | (Denmark) Martin Dew (England) Gillian Gilks | 8–15, 15–9, 8–15 | Silver |
| 1984 | Istora Senayan, Jakarta, Indonesia | (Indonesia) Ivana Lie | (Sweden) Thomas Kihlström (England) Nora Perry | 18–15, 13–15, 8–15 | Silver |
| 1985 | Istora Senayan, Jakarta, Indonesia | (Indonesia) Ivana Lie | (Denmark) Steen Fladberg (England) Nora Perry | 15–11, 18–17 | Gold |

=== Asian Games ===
Men's doubles
| Year | Venue | Partner | Opponent | Score | Result |
|---|---|---|---|---|---|
| 1974 | Amjadieh Sport Complex, Tehran, Iran | (Indonesia) Ade Chandra | (Indonesia) Tjun Tjun (Indonesia) Johan Wahjudi | 9–15, 7–15 | Silver |
| 1978 | Indoor Stadium Huamark, Bangkok, Thailand | (Indonesia) Ade Chandra | (China) Lin Shiquan (China) Tang Xianhu | 15–8, 15–10 | Gold |
| 1982 | Indraprastha Indoor Stadium, New Delhi, India | (Indonesia) Icuk Sugiarto | (China) Lin Jiangli (China) Luan Jin | 15–6, 15–8 | Gold |

Mixed doubles
| Year | Venue | Partner | Opponent | Score | Result |
|---|---|---|---|---|---|
| 1974 | Amjadieh Sport Complex, Tehran, Iran | (Indonesia) Regina Masli | (Indonesia) Tjun Tjun (Indonesia) Sri Wiyanti | 15–10, 15–8 | Gold |
| 1978 | Indoor Stadium Huamark, Bangkok, Thailand | (Indonesia) Imelda Wiguna | (China) Tang Xianhu (China) Zhang Ailing | 15–12, 7–15, 5–15 | Bronze |
| 1982 | Indraprastha Indoor Stadium, New Delhi, India | (Indonesia) Ivana Lie | (Indonesia) Icuk Sugiarto (Indonesia) Ruth Damayanti | 3–15, 15–8, 15–10 | Gold |

=== Asian Championships ===
Men's doubles
| Year | Venue | Partner | Opponent | Score | Result |
|---|---|---|---|---|---|
| 1971 | Istora Senayan, Jakarta, Indonesia | (Indonesia) Ade Chandra | (India) Dipu Ghosh (India) Raman Ghosh | 15–3, 15–6 | Bronze |

Mixed doubles
| Year | Venue | Partner | Opponent | Score | Result |
|---|---|---|---|---|---|
| 1971 | Istora Senayan, Jakarta, Indonesia | (Indonesia) Retno Koestijah | (Indonesia) Indra Gunawan (Indonesia) Intan Nurtjahja | 18–13, 15–5 | Gold |

=== SEA Games ===
Men's doubles
| Year | Venue | Partner | Opponent | Score | Result |
|---|---|---|---|---|---|
| 1979 | Gema Sumantri Hall, Jakarta, Indonesia | (Indonesia) Ade Chandra | (Thailand) Bandid Jaiyen (Thailand) Preecha Sopajaree | 9–15, 5–15 | Silver |
| 1983 | Singapore Badminton Hall, Singapore | (Indonesia) Bobby Ertanto | (Indonesia) Hadibowo (Indonesia) Liem Swie King | 8–15, 15–9, 15–5 | Gold |
| 1985 | Chulalongkorn University Indoor Stadium, Bangkok, Thailand | (Indonesia) Chafidz Yusuf | (Malaysia) Jalani Sidek (Malaysia) Razif Sidek | 10–15, 4–15 | Bronze |

Mixed doubles
| Year | Venue | Partner | Opponent | Score | Result |
|---|---|---|---|---|---|
| 1977 | Selangor Badminton Association Hall, Kuala Lumpur, Malaysia | (Indonesia) Regina Masli | (Malaysia) Dominic Soong (Malaysia) Yap Hei Lin | 15–10, 15–6 | Gold |
| 1979 | Gema Sumantri Hall, Jakarta, Indonesia | (Indonesia) Imelda Wiguna | (Indonesia) Kartono (Indonesia) Tjan So Gwan | 18–16, 15–2 | Gold |
| 1983 | Singapore Badminton Hall, Singapore | (Indonesia) Ivanna Lie | (Indonesia) Bobby Ertanto (Indonesia) Ruth Damayanti | 15–2,15–2 | Gold |
| 1985 | Chulalongkorn University Indoor Stadium, Bangkok, Thailand | (Indonesia) Imelda Wiguna | (Indonesia) Chafidz Yusuf (Indonesia) Rosiana Tendean | 15–9,15–5 | Gold |

=== International tournaments (19 titles, 17 runners-up) ===
The World Badminton Grand Prix has been sanctioned by the International Badminton Federation from 1983 to 2006.

Men's singles
| Year | Tournament | Opponent | Score | Result |
|---|---|---|---|---|
| 1973 | All England Open | (Indonesia) Rudy Hartono | 4–15, 2–15 | (silver) Runner-up |

Men's doubles
| Year | Tournament | Partner | Opponent | Score | Result |
|---|---|---|---|---|---|
| 1971 | Singapore Open | (Indonesia) Ade Chandra | (Japan) Junji Honma (Japan) Ippei Kojima | 15–10, 15–8 | (gold) Winner |
| 1972 | All England Open | (Indonesia) Ade Chandra | (England) Ray Stevens (England) Mike Tredgett | 15–5, 15–12 | (gold) Winner |
| 1973 | All England Open | (Indonesia) Ade Chandra | (Indonesia) Tjun Tjun (Indonesia) Johan Wahjudi | 15–1, 15–7 | (gold) Winner |
| 1973 | German Open | (Indonesia) Ade Chandra | (Indonesia) Tjun Tjun (Indonesia) Johan Wahjudi | 4–15, 9–15 | (silver) Runner-up |
| 1973 | Singapore Open | (Indonesia) Indra Gunawan | (Indonesia) Tjun Tjun (Indonesia) Johan Wahjudi | 11–15, 11–15 | (silver) Runner-up |
| 1973 | Denmark Open | (Indonesia) Ade Chandra | (Indonesia) Tjun Tjun (Indonesia) Johan Wahjudi | 3–15, 7–15 | (silver) Runner-up |
| 1974 | All England Open | (Indonesia) Ade Chandra | (Indonesia) Tjun Tjun (Indonesia) Johan Wahjudi | 8–15, 6–15 | (silver) Runner-up |
| 1974 | Denmark Open | (Indonesia) Iie Sumirat | (Indonesia) Tjun Tjun (Indonesia) Johan Wahjudi | 14–18, 9–15 | (silver) Runner-up |
| 1975 | All England Open | (Indonesia) Ade Chandra | (Indonesia) Tjun Tjun (Indonesia) Johan Wahjudi | 11–15, 5–15 | (silver) Runner-up |
| 1975 | Denmark Open | (Indonesia) Ade Chandra | (Indonesia) Tjun Tjun (Indonesia) Johan Wahjudi | 6–15, 1–15 | (silver) Runner-up |
| 1977 | All England Open | (Indonesia) Ade Chandra | (Indonesia) Tjun Tjun (Indonesia) Johan Wahjudi | 7–15, 15–18 | (silver) Runner-up |
| 1978 | All England Open | (Indonesia) Ade Chandra | (Indonesia) Tjun Tjun (Indonesia) Johan Wahjudi | 12–15, 8–15 | (silver) Runner-up |
| 1978 | Denmark Open | (Indonesia) Ade Chandra | (Denmark) Flemming Delfs (Denmark) Steen Skovgaard | 6–15, 11–15 | (silver) Runner-up |
| 1979 | Canadian Open | (Indonesia) Ade Chandra | (Denmark) Flemming Delfs (Denmark) Morten Frost | 15–5, 15–1 | (gold) Winner |
| 1980 | Swedish Open | (Indonesia) Ade Chandra | (Sweden) Bengt Fröman (Sweden) Thomas Kihlström | 15–5, 12–15, 15–9 | (gold) Winner |
| 1981 | Denmark Open | (Indonesia) Ade Chandra | (Sweden) Stefan Karlsson (Sweden) Thomas Kihlström | 15–5, 15–18, 15–10 | (gold) Winner |
| 1981 | Japan Open | (Indonesia) Lius Pongoh | (Denmark) Flemming Delfs (India) Prakash Padukone | 15–4, 15–5 | (gold) Winner |
| 1982 | Denmark Open | (Indonesia) Lius Pongoh | (South Korea) Lee Eun-ku (South Korea) Park Joo-bong | 9–15, 15–11, 16–18 | (silver) Runner-up |
| 1982 | Swedish Open | (Indonesia) Lius Pongoh | (Sweden) Stefan Karlsson (Sweden) Thomas Kihlström | 15–11, 15–8 | (gold) Winner |
| 1983 | Malaysia Open | (Indonesia) Bobby Ertanto | (South Korea) Park Joo-bong (South Korea) Sung Han-kook | 15–10, 15–5 | (gold) Winner |
| 1983 | Indonesia Open | (Indonesia) Bobby Ertanto | (Indonesia) Rudy Heryanto (Indonesia) Kartono | 9–15, 14–18 | (silver) Runner-up |
| 1984 | Thailand Open | (Indonesia) Hadibowo | (Malaysia) Ong Beng Teong (Malaysia) Razif Sidek | 15–13, 15–11 | (gold) Winner |
| 1984 | Indonesia Open | (Indonesia) Hadibowo | (Indonesia) Rudy Heryanto (Indonesia) Kartono | 10–15, 18–13, 15–7 | (gold) Winner |
| 1984 | English Masters | (Indonesia) Hadibowo | (Denmark) Morten Frost (Denmark) Jens Peter Nierhoff | 15–3, 15–3 | (gold) Winner |
| 1984 | Dutch Masters | (Indonesia) Hadibowo | (China) Ding Qiqing (China) Jiang Guoliang | 15–9, 15–10 | (gold) Winner |
| 1985 | Japan Open | (Indonesia) Hadibowo | (South Korea) Kim Moon-soo (South Korea) Park Joo-bong | 16–17, 2–15 | (silver) Runner-up |
| 1988 | U.S. Open | (Indonesia) Lius Pongoh | (Indonesia) Liem Swie King (India) Prakash Padukone | 7–15, 15–11, 15–13 | (gold) Winner |

Mixed doubles
| Year | Tournament | Partner | Opponent | Score | Result |
|---|---|---|---|---|---|
| 1979 | All England Open | (Indonesia) Imelda Wiguna | (England) Mike Tredgett (England) Nora Perry | 15–1, 18–17 | (gold) Winner |
| 1979 | Canadian Open | (Indonesia) Imelda Wiguna | (Indonesia) Ade Chandra (Indonesia) Verawaty Wiharjo | 15–6, 15–1 | (gold) Winner |
| 1980 | All England Open | (Indonesia) Imelda Wiguna | (England) Mike Tredgett (England) Nora Perry | 13–18, 10–15 | (silver) Runner-up |
| 1981 | All England Open | (Indonesia) Imelda Wiguna | (England) Mike Tredgett (England) Nora Perry | 15–10, 14–18, 10–15 | (silver) Runner-up |
| 1981 | Denmark Open | (Indonesia) Imelda Wiguna | (England) Mike Tredgett (England) Nora Perry | 2–15, 2–15 | (silver) Runner-up |
| 1983 | Indonesia Open | (Indonesia) Ivana Lie | (England) Martin Dew (England) Gillian Gilks | 18–17, 15–9 | (gold) Winner |
| 1984 | Indonesia Open | (Indonesia) Ivana Lie | (England) Martin Dew (England) Gillian Gilks | 15–12, 15–7 | (gold) Winner |
| 1988 | U.S. Open | (Indonesia) Ivana Lie | (China) Lee Xiong (China) Yang Xinfang | 9–15, 15–0, 15–14 | (gold) Winner |

IBF Grand Prix tournament
IBF Grand Prix Finals tournament

=== Invitational tournaments ===
Men's doubles
| Year | Tournament | Partner | Opponent | Score | Result |
|---|---|---|---|---|---|
| 1972 | World Invitational Championships | (Indonesia) Ade Chandra | (Indonesia) Tjun Tjun (Indonesia) Johan Wahjudi | 10–15, 10–15 | Silver |
| 1974 (Jakarta) | World Invitational Championships | (Indonesia) Ade Chandra | (Indonesia) Tjun Tjun (Indonesia) Johan Wahjudi | 13–15, 15–9, 15–18 | Silver |
| 1975 | World Invitational Championships | (Indonesia) Ade Chandra | (Indonesia) Tjun Tjun (Indonesia) Johan Wahjudi | 12–15, 11–15 | Silver |
| 1976 | Asian Invitational Championships | (Indonesia) Ade Chandra | (China) Luan Jin (China) Tang Xianhu | 15–8, 15–10 | Gold |
| 1977 | Asian Invitational Championships | (Indonesia) Ade Chandra | (Indonesia) Tjun Tjun (Indonesia) Johan Wahjudi | 17–14, 2–15, 5–15 | Silver |

Mixed doubles
| Year | Tournament | Partner | Opponent | Score | Result |
|---|---|---|---|---|---|
| 1974 | World Invitational Championships | (Indonesia) Regina Masli | (Indonesia) Tjun Tjun (Indonesia) Sri Wiyanti | 15–7, 15–3 | Gold |
| 1975 | World Invitational Championships | (Indonesia) Regina Masli | (Denmark) Elo Hansen (Malaysia) Sylvia Ng | 15–7, 15–5 | Gold |

Olympic Games
| Preceded by Tonny Maringgi; Rexy Mainaky | Flagbearer for Indonesia; Barcelona 1992; Athens 2004 | Succeeded by Hendrik Simangunsong; Oka Sulaksana |
