= Hariamanto Kartono =

Chinese-Indonesian badminton player (born 1954)

Personal information
- Born: 8 August 1954 (age 72) Tegal, Central Java, Indonesia
- Years active: 1978–1986

Sport
- Country: Indonesia
- Sport: Badminton
- Handedness: Right
- Event: Men's doubles
Medal record
Men's badminton
Representing Indonesia
World Championships
Silver medal – second place	1980 Jakarta	Men's doubles
Bronze medal – third place	1985 Calgary	Men's doubles
World Games
Bronze medal – third place	1981 Santa Clara	Men's doubles
World Cup
Gold medal – first place	1984 Jakarta	Men's doubles
Gold medal – first place	1985 Jakarta	Men's doubles
Bronze medal – third place	1984 Jakarta	Mixed doubles
Thomas Cup
Gold medal – first place	1984 Kuala Lumpur	Men's team
Silver medal – second place	1982 London	Men's team
Silver medal – second place	1986 Jakarta	Men's team
Asian Games
Silver medal – second place	1978 Bangkok	Mixed doubles
Silver medal – second place	1982 New Delhi	Men's team
SEA Games
Gold medal – first place	1979 Jakarta	Men's team
Gold medal – first place	1981 Manila	Men's team
Gold medal – first place	1981 Manila	Men's doubles
Gold medal – first place	1985 Bangkok	Men's team
Silver medal – second place	1985 Bangkok	Men's doubles

Hariamanto Kartono (Chinese: 陳金德; born 8 August 1954) is a retired Chinese Indonesian badminton player.

== Career ==
Partnered first with Rudy Heryanto and later with singles star Liem Swie King, Kartono was one of the world's leading doubles players in the early and mid-1980s. As upstarts, he and Heryanto took silver medals at the 1980 IBF World Championships in Jakarta, losing the final to veteran fellow countrymen Ade Chandra and Christian Hadinata. At the 1981 All-England Championships they avenged that loss in the semifinal, and went on to defeat another highly decorated Indonesian pair, Tjun Tjun and Johan Wahjudi, in the final. They won the All-Englands again in 1984 and the Indonesia Open in 1982 and 1983. Partnered with Liem Swie King, Kartono won the Indonesia Open again in 1985 and 1986, and the Badminton World Cup in 1984 and 1985. Kartono and King earned bronze medals together at the 1985 IBF World Championships in Calgary, losing a close semifinal to the eventual champions Park Joo-bong and Kim Moon-soo.

Kartono competed in contests for badminton's highly coveted Thomas Cup, the men's world team championship. In 1982 he and partner Heryanto, after beating one Chinese team, lost the match that gave China its first Thomas Cup title. In the following 1984 Thomas Cup series, however, he partnered with Liem Swie King to take the a three-to-two victory for Indonesia against China, giving Indonesia its eighth Thomas Cup championship.

== Achievements ==
=== World Championships ===
Men's doubles
Year	Venue	Partner	Opponent	Score	Result
1980	Istora Senayan, Jakarta, Indonesia	(Indonesia) Rudy Heryanto	(Indonesia) Ade Chandra (Indonesia) Christian Hadinata	15–5, 5–15, 7–15	Silver
1985	Olympic Saddledome, Calgary, Canada	(Indonesia) Liem Swie King	(South Korea) Kim Moon-soo (South Korea) Park Joo-bong	11–15, 15–17	Bronze

=== World Cup ===
Men's doubles
Year	Venue	Partner	Opponent	Score	Result
1984	Istora Senayan, Jakarta, Indonesia	(Indonesia) Liem Swie King	(China) Li Yongbo (China) Tian Bingyi	15–8, 15–1	Gold
1985	Istora Senayan, Jakarta, Indonesia	(Indonesia) Liem Swie King	(China) Li Yongbo (China) Tian Bingyi	15–11, 11–15, 15–11	Gold

Men's doubles
Year	Venue	Partner	Opponent	Score	Result
1984	Istora Senayan, Jakarta, Indonesia	(Indonesia) Imelda Wiguna	(Sweden) Thomas Kihlström (England) Nora Perry	16–18, 7–15	Bronze

=== World Games ===
Men's doubles
Year	Venue	Partner	Opponent	Score	Result
1981	San Jose Civic Auditorium, California, United States	(Indonesia) Rudy Heryanto	(China) Sun Zhian (China) Yao Ximing	15–3, 11–15, 8–15	Bronze

=== World Masters Games ===
Men's doubles

Year	Age	Venue	Partner	Opponent	Score	Result	Ref
2009	50+	Sydney Olympic Park Sports Centre, Sydney, Australia	(Singapore) Akhmad Khafidz Basri Yusuf	(New Zealand) Bruce Darby (New Zealand) Kevin Ross	15–11, 15–8	Bronze	
2009	55+	Sydney Olympic Park Sports Centre, Sydney, Australia	(New Zealand) John Liong Kiat Wong	(Thailand) Attakorn Maensamut (Thailand) Jiamsak Panitchaikul	7–15, 4–15	Silver	

=== Asian Games ===
Mixed doubles
Year	Venue	Partner	Opponent	Score	Result
1978	Indoor Stadium Huamark, Bangkok, Thailand	(Indonesia) Theresia Widiastuti	(China) Tang Xianhu (China) Zhang Ailing	8–15, 16–17	Silver

=== SEA Games ===
Men's doubles
Year	Venue	Partner	Opponent	Score	Result
1981	Camp Crame Gymnasium, Manila, Philippines	(Indonesia) Rudy Heryanto	(Malaysia) Jalani Sidek (Malaysia) Razif Sidek	15–12, 15–6	Gold
1985	Chulalongkorn University Indoor Stadium; Bangkok, Thailand	(Indonesia) Liem Swie King	(Malaysia) Jalani Sidek (Malaysia) Razif Sidek	15–6, 11–15, 5–15	Silver

=== International tournaments (16 titles, 2 runners-up) ===
The World Badminton Grand Prix has been sanctioned by the International Badminton Federation from 1983 to 2006.

Men's doubles
Year	Tournament	Partner	Opponent	Score	Result
1979	Indian International	(Indonesia) Hadiyanto	(Malaysia) M. K. Ann (Malaysia) Soh Goon Chup	15–8, 15–10	(gold) Winner
1979	India Open	(Indonesia) Rudy Heryanto	(Indonesia) Dhany Sartika (Indonesia) Hadiyanto	15–1, 15–11	(gold) Winner
1980	Auckland International	(Indonesia) Rudy Heryanto	(New Zealand) Bryan Purser (New Zealand) Steve Wilson	15–4, 15–9	(gold) Winner
1981	Copenhagen Cup	(Indonesia) Rudy Heryanto	(Sweden) Stefan Karlsson (Sweden) Thomas Kihlström	10–15, 15–12, 15–17	(gold) Winner
1981	All England	(Indonesia) Rudy Heryanto	(Indonesia) Tjun Tjun (Indonesia) Johan Wahjudi	15–9, 15–8	(gold) Winner
1981	India Open	(Indonesia) Rudy Heryanto	(Sweden) Stefan Karlsson (Sweden) Thomas Kihlström	15–6, 8–15, 15–17	(silver) Runner-up
1982	Indonesia Open	(Indonesia) Rudy Heryanto	(Indonesia) Christian Hadinata (Denmark) Jens Peter Nierhoff	15–1, 10–15, 15–2	(gold) Winner
1982	Hong Kong Open	(Indonesia) Rudy Heryanto	(Sweden) Stefan Karlsson (Sweden) Thomas Kihlström	15–3, 15–6	(gold) Winner
1982	Japan Open	(Indonesia) Rudy Heryanto	(England) Martin Dew (England) Mike Tredgett	9–15, 15–7, 18–14	(gold) Winner
1983	Indonesia Open	(Indonesia) Rudy Heryanto	(Indonesia) Bobby Ertanto (Indonesia) Christian Hadinata	15–9, 18–14	(gold) Winner
1983	Holland Masters	(Indonesia) Rudy Heryanto	(Malaysia) Jalani Sidek (Malaysia) Razif Sidek	15–4, 15–9	(gold) Winner
1983	Scandinavian Cup	(Indonesia) Rudy Heryanto	(England) Martin Dew (England) Mike Tredgett	12–15, 18–16, 15–11	(gold) Winner
1984	All England Open	(Indonesia) Rudy Heryanto	(England) Martin Dew (England) Mike Tredgett	15–11, 15–6	(gold) Winner
1984	Indonesia Open	(Indonesia) Rudy Heryanto	(Indonesia) Christian Hadinata (Indonesia) Hadibowo Susanto	15–10, 13–18, 7–15	(silver) Runner-up
1985	Chinese Taipei Open	(Indonesia) Rudy Heryanto	(Denmark) Mark Christiansen (Denmark) Michael Kjeldsen	18–17, 8–15, 18–17	(gold) Winner
1985	Indonesia Open	(Indonesia) Liem Swie King	(China) Li Yongbo (China) Tian Bingyi	15–5, 15–10	(gold) Winner
1986	Indonesia Open	(Indonesia) Liem Swie King	(Malaysia) Jalani Sidek (Malaysia) Razif Sidek	15–3, 12–15, 15–12	(gold) Winner

Mixed doubles
Year	Tournament	Partner	Opponent	Score	Result
1979	India Open	(Indonesia) Tjan So Gwan	(Indonesia) Rudy Heryanto (Indonesia) Ivana Lie	15–9, 15–2	(gold) Winner

IBF Grand Prix tournament
IBF Grand Prix Finals tournament
