= Razif Sidek =

Malaysian badminton player (born 1962)

Personal information
- Nickname: Ajib
- Born: Mohamed Razif bin Mohd Sidek; 29 May 1962 (age 64) Banting, Selangor, Malaysia
- Years active: 1980–1994
- Height: 1.74 m (5 ft 9 in)
- Weight: 70 kg (154 lb; 11 st 0 lb)

Sport
- Country: Malaysia
- Sport: Badminton
- Handedness: Right

Men's doubles
- Career title: 32
- Highest ranking: 1 (1989)
- BWF profile
Medal record
Men's badminton
Representing Malaysia
Olympic Games
Bronze medal – third place	1992 Barcelona	Men's doubles
World Championships
Silver medal – second place	1987 Beijing	Men's doubles
Bronze medal – third place	1989 Jakarta	Men's doubles
World Cup
Gold medal – first place	1990 Bandung/Jakarta	Men's doubles
Gold medal – first place	1991 Macau	Men's doubles
Silver medal – second place	1988 Bangkok	Men's doubles
Bronze medal – third place	1983 Kuala Lumpur	Men's doubles
Bronze medal – third place	1984 Jakarta	Men's doubles
Bronze medal – third place	1985 Jakarta	Men's doubles
Bronze medal – third place	1987 Kuala Lumpur	Men's doubles
Thomas Cup
Gold medal – first place	1992 Kuala Lumpur	Team
Silver medal – second place	1988 Kuala Lumpur	Team
Silver medal – second place	1990 Tokyo	Team
Silver medal – second place	1994 Jakarta	Team
Bronze medal – third place	1986 Jakarta	Team
Commonwealth Games
Gold medal – first place	1982 Brisbane	Men's doubles
Gold medal – first place	1990 Auckland	Men's doubles
Bronze medal – third place	1982 Brisbane	Men's singles
Asian Games
Silver medal – second place	1990 Beijing	Men's team
Bronze medal – third place	1990 Beijing	Men's doubles
Asian Championships
Gold medal – first place	1992 Kuala Lumpur	Men's doubles
Silver medal – second place	1985 Kuala Lumpur	Men's doubles
Silver medal – second place	1985 Kuala Lumpur	Men's team
Bronze medal – third place	1989 Shanghai	Men's team
Bronze medal – third place	1994 Shanghai	Men's doubles
Southeast Asian Games
Gold medal – first place	1985 Bangkok	Men's doubles
Gold medal – first place	1989 Kuala Lumpur	Men's team
Gold medal – first place	1991 Manila	Men's team
Silver medal – second place	1981 Manila	Men's doubles
Silver medal – second place	1981 Manila	Men's team
Silver medal – second place	1983 Singapore	Men's team
Silver medal – second place	1985 Bangkok	Men's team
Silver medal – second place	1989 Kuala Lumpur	Men's doubles
Silver medal – second place	1991 Manila	Men's doubles
Bronze medal – third place	1981 Manila	Mixed doubles
Bronze medal – third place	1983 Singapore	Mixed doubles
Bronze medal – third place	1985 Bangkok	Mixed doubles

Mohamed Razif Mohd Sidek (born 29 May 1962) is a former badminton player from Malaysia and coach.

== Personal life ==
He is the second eldest of the five Sidek brothers. Razif and his siblings gained exposure about badminton sport from their father, Haji Mohd Sidek. Razif Sidek is one of the alumni of Victoria Institution (batch 1975–1980).

He is married to a former model, Khalidah Khalid and the couple has five children. In addition, his youngest son, Mohd Fazriq is also active in badminton. He became a grandfather in December 2018, after one of his children became a first-time parent.

On 19 May 2026, Sidek was robbed at knifepoint by a Rohingya labourer at his home in Taman Tun Dr Ismail, Kuala Lumpur. Later, on 12 June, the man pleaded not guilty for the incident. Deputy Public Prosecutor, J. Banusha, urged the Sessions Court to not grant him bail, arguing that the robbery was a serious offence and stated that his United Nations High Commissioner for Refugees (UNHCR) card had expired.

== Career ==
His regular partner is his younger brother, Jalani. Razif won a gold medal for Malaysia at the 1982 Commonwealth Games doubles with Ong Beng Teong. They won the All England Championships in 1982 after beating the Scottish pair, Billy Gilliland and Dan Travers.

The Sidek brothers won almost every title on offer during their playing career, including the World Grand Prix, World Cup, SEA Games, Commonwealth Games and Asian Championships. They introduced the “S” Service, which caused a deceptively erratic shuttle movement. The service was eventually banned by the International Badminton Federation (IBF).

He was also a member of the Malaysian squad that won the Thomas Cup for the first time in 25 years, in a 3–2 victory over Indonesia at the National Stadium in 1992. He was the first Malaysian athlete to win an Olympic Games medal in Barcelona 1992. They won a bronze medal for Malaysia after reaching the semi-finals in the men's doubles category where they lost to the Korean pair, Park Joo-bong and Kim Moon-Soo.

== Coaching ==
After he retired, he served as Malaysian national head coach from 1994 until 1996. Razif guided Cheah Soon Kit-Yap Kim Hock to Malaysia's first-ever Olympic silver medal at the 1996 Atlanta Games.

== Achievements ==
=== Olympic Games ===
Men's doubles
Year	Venue	Partner	Opponent	Score	Result
1992	Pavelló de la Mar Bella, Barcelona, Spain	(Malaysia) Jalani Sidek	(South Korea) Kim Moon-soo (South Korea) Park Joo-bong	11–15, 13–15	Bronze

=== World Championships ===
Men's doubles
Year	Venue	Partner	Opponent	Score	Result
1987	Capital Indoor Stadium, Beijing, China	(Malaysia) Jalani Sidek	(China) Li Yongbo (China) Tian Bingyi	2–15, 15–8, 9–15	Silver
1989	Senayan Sports Complex, Jakarta, Indonesia	(Malaysia) Jalani Sidek	(China) Li Yongbo (China) Tian Bingyi	10–15, 9–15	Bronze

=== World Cup ===
Men's doubles
Year	Venue	Partner	Opponent	Score	Result
1983	Stadium Negara, Kuala Lumpur, Malaysia	(Malaysia) Jalani Sidek	(South Korea) Kim Moon-soo (South Korea) Park Joo-bong	15–10, 5–15, 7–15	Bronze
1984	Istora Senayan, Jakarta, Indonesia	(Malaysia) Jalani Sidek	(China) Li Yongbo (China) Tian Bingyi	9–15, 1–15	Bronze
1985	Istora Senayan, Jakarta, Indonesia	(Malaysia) Jalani Sidek	(Indonesia) Hariamanto Kartono (Indonesia) Liem Swie King	14–17, 11–15	Bronze
1987	Stadium Negara, Kuala Lumpur, Malaysia	(Malaysia) Jalani Sidek	(China) Li Yongbo (China) Tian Bingyi	6–15, 12–15	Bronze
1988	National Stadium, Bangkok, Thailand	(Malaysia) Jalani Sidek	(China) Li Yongbo (China) Tian Bingyi	Walkover	Silver
1990	Istora Senayan, Jakarta, Indonesia	(Malaysia) Jalani Sidek	(Indonesia) Rudy Gunawan (Indonesia) Eddy Hartono	14–17, 15–8, 15–7	Gold
1991	Macau Forum, Macau	(Malaysia) Jalani Sidek	(South Korea) Kim Moon-soo (South Korea) Park Joo-bong	15–18, 15–11, 15–2	Gold

=== Asian Games ===
Men's doubles
Year	Venue	Partner	Opponent	Score	Result
1990	Beijing Gymnasium, Beijing, China	(Malaysia) Jalani Sidek	(China) Li Yongbo (China) Tian Bingyi	5–15, 15–18	Bronze

=== Asian Championships ===
Men's doubles
Year	Venue	Partner	Opponent	Score	Result
1985	Stadium Negara, Kuala Lumpur, Malaysia	(Malaysia) Jalani Sidek	(South Korea) Kim Moon-soo (South Korea) Park Joo-bong	5–15, 15–8, 2–15	Silver
1992	Cheras Indoor Stadium, Kuala Lumpur, Malaysia	(Malaysia) Jalani Sidek	(China) Huang Zhanzhong (China) Zheng Yumin	15–4, 15–6	Gold
1994	Shanghai Gymnasium, Shanghai, China	(Malaysia) Jalani Sidek	(China) Chen Hongyong (China) Chen Kang	8–15, 10–15	Bronze

=== Southeast Asian Games ===
Men's doubles
Year	Venue	Partner	Opponent	Score	Result
1981	Camp Crame Gymnasium, Manila, Philippines	(Malaysia) Jalani Sidek	(Indonesia) Rudy Heryanto (Indonesia) Hariamanto Kartono	12–15, 6–15	Silver
1985	Chulalongkorn University Indoor Stadium, Bangkok, Thailand	(Malaysia) Jalani Sidek	(Indonesia) Hariamanto Kartono (Indonesia) Liem Swie King	6–15, 15–11, 15–5	Gold
1989	Stadium Negara, Kuala Lumpur, Malaysia	(Malaysia) Jalani Sidek	(Indonesia) Rudy Gunawan (Indonesia) Eddy Hartono	11–15, 12–15	Silver
1991	Camp Crame Gymnasium, Manila, Philippines	(Malaysia) Jalani Sidek	(Indonesia) Rudy Gunawan (Indonesia) Eddy Hartono	11–15, 6–15	Silver

=== Commonwealth Games ===
Men's singles
Year	Venue	Opponent	Score	Result
1982	Chandler Sports Hall, Brisbane, Australia	(Canada) Keith Priestman	15–8, 15–2	Bronze

Men's doubles
Year	Venue	Partner	Opponent	Score	Result
1982	Chandler Sports Hall, Brisbane, Australia	(Malaysia) Ong Beng Teong	(England) Martin Dew (England) Nick Yates	15–10, 17–15	Gold
1990	Auckland Badminton Hall, Auckland, New Zealand	(Malaysia) Jalani Sidek	(Malaysia) Cheah Soon Kit (Malaysia) Rashid Sidek	15–8, 15–8	Gold

=== IBF World Grand Prix (21 titles, 23 runners-up) ===
The World Badminton Grand Prix sanctioned by International Badminton Federation (IBF) since from 1983 to 2006.

Men's doubles
Year	Tournament	Partner	Opponent	Score	Result
1983	Canada Open	(Malaysia) Jalani Sidek	(Canada) Mark Freitag (Canada) Bob MacDougall	15–3, 15–4	(gold) Winner
1983	Holland Masters	(Malaysia) Jalani Sidek	(Indonesia) Rudy Heryanto (Indonesia) Hariamanto Kartono	4–15, 9–15	(silver) Runner-up
1984	Thailand Open	(Malaysia) Ong Beng Teong	(Indonesia) Christian Hadinata (Indonesia) Hadibowo Susanto	6–15, 15–12, 10–15	(silver) Runner-up
1984	Malaysia Open	(Malaysia) Jalani Sidek	(South Korea) Kim Moon-soo (South Korea) Lee Deuk-choon	6–15, 15–12, 10–15	(silver) Runner-up
1984	Canada Open	(Malaysia) Jalani Sidek	(Scotland) Billy Gilliland (Scotland) Dan Travers	15–11, 15–9	(gold) Winner
1985	Denmark Open	(Malaysia) Jalani Sidek	(China) Li Yongbo (China) Tian Bingyi	14–17, 8–15	(silver) Runner-up
1985	Malaysia Open	(Malaysia) Jalani Sidek	(England) Martin Dew (England) Dipak Tailor	18–16, 12–15, 15–3	(gold) Winner
1985	Malaysian Masters	(Malaysia) Jalani Sidek	(China) Li Yongbo (China) Tian Bingyi	10–15, 7–15	(silver) Runner-up
1986	Chinese Taipei Open	(Malaysia) Jalani Sidek	(South Korea) Kim Chung-soo (South Korea) Lee Deuk-choon	15–4, 15–5	(gold) Winner
1986	Japan Open	(Malaysia) Jalani Sidek	(Indonesia) Bobby Ertanto (Indonesia) Rudy Heryanto	15–11, 15–2	(gold) Winner
1986	All England Open	(Malaysia) Jalani Sidek	(South Korea) Kim Moon-soo (South Korea) Park Joo-bong	2–15, 11–15	(silver) Runner-up
1986	Malaysia Open	(Malaysia) Jalani Sidek	(Indonesia) Bobby Ertanto (Indonesia) Rudy Heryanto	15–10, 11–15, 15–10	(gold) Winner
1986	Indonesia Open	(Malaysia) Jalani Sidek	(Indonesia) Hariamanto Kartono (Indonesia) Liem Swie King	3–15, 15–12, 12–15	(silver) Runner-up
1986	World Grand Prix Finals	(Malaysia) Jalani Sidek	(Indonesia) Eddy Hartono (Indonesia) Hadibowo Susanto	10–15, 15–5, 18–13	(gold) Winner
1987	Malaysia Open	(Malaysia) Jalani Sidek	(China) Li Yongbo (China) Tian Bingyi	Walkover	(gold) Winner
1987	English Masters	(Malaysia) Jalani Sidek	(Japan) Shuji Matsuno (Japan) Shinji Matsuura	15–11, 15–9	(gold) Winner
1987	Denmark Open	(Malaysia) Jalani Sidek	(Sweden) Jan-Eric Antonsson (Sweden) Pär-Gunnar Jönsson	15–11, 15–7	(gold) Winner
1988	All England Open	(Malaysia) Jalani Sidek	(China) Li Yongbo (China) Tian Bingyi	6–15, 7–15	(silver) Runner-up
1988	French Open	(Malaysia) Jalani Sidek	(South Korea) Park Joo-bong (South Korea) Sung Han-kuk	8–15, 15–12, 12–15	(silver) Runner-up
1988	Thailand Open	(Malaysia) Rashid Sidek	(China) Li Yongbo (China) Tian Bingyi	3–15, 5–15	(silver) Runner-up
1988	Indonesia Open	(Malaysia) Jalani Sidek	(China) Chen Hongyong (China) Chen Kang	16–18, 15–5, 15–2	(gold) Winner
1988	English Masters	(Malaysia) Jalani Sidek	(China) Li Yongbo (China) Tian Bingyi	11–15, 4–15	(silver) Runner-up
1988	Denmark Open	(Malaysia) Jalani Sidek	(China) Li Yongbo (China) Tian Bingyi	6–15, 15–8, 4–15	(silver) Runner-up
1988	Malaysia Open	(Malaysia) Jalani Sidek	(China) Li Yongbo (China) Tian Bingyi	12–15, 12–15	(silver) Runner-up
1988	World Grand Prix Finals	(Malaysia) Jalani Sidek	(Indonesia) Rudy Gunawan (Indonesia) Eddy Hartono	10–15, 15–6, 15–8	(gold) Winner
1989	Chinese Taipei Open	(Malaysia) Jalani Sidek	(Sweden) Jan-Eric Antonsson (Sweden) Pär-Gunnar Jönsson	15–3, 15–2	(gold) Winner
1989	Malaysia Open	(Malaysia) Jalani Sidek	(South Korea) Kim Moon-soo (South Korea) Park Joo-bong	12–15, 15–10, 7–15	(silver) Runner-up
1989	Thailand Open	(Malaysia) Cheah Soon Kit	(South Korea) Kim Moon-soo (South Korea) Park Joo-bong	11–15, 3–15	(silver) Runner-up
1989	China Open	(Malaysia) Jalani Sidek	(China) Huang Zhanzhong (China) Zheng Yumin	9–15, 17–14, 15–12	(gold) Winner
1989	Hong Kong Open	(Malaysia) Jalani Sidek	(China) Chen Yu (China) He Xiangyang	15–12, 15–6	(gold) Winner
1989	Denmark Open	(Malaysia) Jalani Sidek	(China) Li Yongbo (China) Tian Bingyi	10–15, 11–15	(silver) Runner-up
1989	Indonesia Open	(Malaysia) Jalani Sidek	(Indonesia) Rudy Gunawan (Indonesia) Eddy Hartono	9–15, 7–15	(silver) Runner-up
1989	World Grand Prix Finals	(Malaysia) Jalani Sidek	(China) Li Yongbo (China) Tian Bingyi	15–9, 15–5	(gold) Winner
1990	Swedish Open	(Malaysia) Jalani Sidek	(China) Li Yongbo (China) Tian Bingyi	7–15, 9–15	(silver) Runner-up
1990	French Open	(Malaysia) Jalani Sidek	(South Korea) Kim Moon-soo (South Korea) Park Joo-bong	3–15, 10–15	(silver) Runner-up
1990	Malaysia Open	(Malaysia) Jalani Sidek	(South Korea) Kim Moon-soo (South Korea) Park Joo-bong	4–15, 15–13, 4–15	(silver) Runner-up
1990	Indonesia Open	(Malaysia) Jalani Sidek	(Indonesia) Thomas Indracahya (Indonesia) Reony Mainaky	15–4, 15–5	(gold) Winner
1991	Chinese Taipei Open	(Malaysia) Jalani Sidek	(Malaysia) Cheah Soon Kit (Malaysia) Soo Beng Kiang	15–7, 15–5	(gold) Winner
1991	Japan Open	(Malaysia) Jalani Sidek	(South Korea) Kim Moon-soo (South Korea) Park Joo-bong	4–15, retired	(silver) Runner-up
1991	Malaysia Open	(Malaysia) Jalani Sidek	(South Korea) Kim Moon-soo (South Korea) Park Joo-bong	8–15, 11–15	(silver) Runner-up
1991	Canada Open	(Malaysia) Jalani Sidek	(Indonesia) Rexy Mainaky (Indonesia) Ricky Subagja	15–11, 15–12	(gold) Winner
1991	US Open	(Malaysia) Jalani Sidek	(Indonesia) Rexy Mainaky (Indonesia) Ricky Subagja	18–13, 13–15, 15–3	(gold) Winner
1991	World Grand Prix Finals	(Malaysia) Jalani Sidek	(China) Huang Zhanzhong (China) Zheng Yumin	15–10, 12–15, 18–15	(gold) Winner
1992	China Open	(Malaysia) Jalani Sidek	(Indonesia) Rexy Mainaky (Indonesia) Ricky Subagja	15–17, 11–15	(silver) Runner-up

=== IBF International (3 titles, 2 runners-up) ===
Men's doubles
Year	Tournament	Partner	Opponent	Score	Result
1981	German Open	(Malaysia) Jalani Sidek	(England) Duncan Bridge (England) Martin Dew	6–15, 15–11, 9–15	(silver) Runner-up
1982	All England Open	(Malaysia) Jalani Sidek	(Scotland) Billy Gilliland (Scotland) Dan Travers	8–15, 15–9, 15–10	(gold) Winner
1983	German Open	(Malaysia) Jalani Sidek	(England) Martin Dew (England) Mike Tredgett	15–8, 12–15, 8–15	(silver) Runner-up
1989	Singapore Open	(Malaysia) Jalani Sidek	(Indonesia) Rudy Gunawan (Indonesia) Eddy Hartono	15–12, 15–8	(gold) Winner
1990	Australia Open	(Malaysia) Jalani Sidek	(Indonesia) Hengky Irawan (Indonesia) Ardy Wiranata	15–8, 18–15	(gold) Winner

== Honours ==
- Malaysia:
  - Member of the Order of the Defender of the Realm (A.M.N.) (1983)
  - Herald of the Order of Loyalty to the Royal Family of Malaysia (B.S.D.) (1988)
  - Officer of the Order of the Defender of the Realm (K.M.N.) (1992)

== See also ==
- Misbun Sidek
- Jalani Sidek
- Rahman Sidek
- Rashid Sidek
