= Rudy Heryanto =

Chinese-Indonesian badminton player (born 1954)

Rudy Heryanto Saputra
Personal information
- Born: 19 October 1954 (age 72) Tasikmalaya, West Java, Indonesia

Sport
- Country: Indonesia
- Sport: Badminton
- Handedness: Right
- Event: Men's doubles
Medal record
Men's badminton
Representing Indonesia
World Championships
Silver medal – second place	1980 Jakarta	Men's doubles
World Games
Bronze medal – third place	1981 Santa Clara	Men's doubles
World Cup
Silver medal – second place	1986 Bandung-Jakarta	Men's doubles
World Masters Games
Gold medal – first place	2009 Sydney	Men's doubles 50+
World Senior Championships
Bronze medal – third place	2025 Pattaya	Men's doubles 70+
Thomas Cup
Gold medal – first place	1984 Kuala Lumpur	Men's team
Silver medal – second place	1982 London	Men's team
Asian Games
Gold medal – first place	1978 Bangkok	Men's team
Silver medal – second place	1982 New Delhi	Men's team
SEA Games
Gold medal – first place	1979 Jakarta	Men's team
Gold medal – first place	1981 Manila	Men's team
Gold medal – first place	1981 Manila	Men's doubles
Gold medal – first place	1987 Jakarta	Men's team
Bronze medal – third place	1987 Jakarta	Men's doubles

Rudy Heryanto (Chinese: 楊榮美; born 19 October 1954) is an Indonesian former badminton player.

== Career ==
A men's doubles specialist, Heryanto and fellow countrymen Hariamanto Kartono formed one of the world's leading teams between 1980 and 1985. As upstarts they earned silver medals at the 1980 IBF World Championships in Jakarta, losing the final to veteran Indonesian teammates Ade Chandra and Christian Hadinata. At the 1981 All-England Championships they avenged that loss in the semifinal and went on to defeat another venerable Indonesian pair, Tjun Tjun and Johan Wahjudi in the final. They won the All-Englands again in 1984 and the Indonesia Open in 1982 and 1983. In the momentous Thomas Cup series of 1982 (China's debut) they split their matches against China in Indonesia's narrow 4–5 final round loss. After the partnership broke up, Heryanto won the Thailand Open with Bobby Ertanto in 1985.

== Achievements ==
=== World Championships ===
Men's doubles
Year	Venue	Partner	Opponent	Score	Result
1980	Istora Senayan, Jakarta, Indonesia	(Indonesia) Kartono	(Indonesia) Ade Chandra (Indonesia) Christian Hadinata	15–5, 5–15, 7–15	Silver

=== World Cup ===
Men's doubles
Year	Venue	Partner	Opponent	Score	Result
1986	Istora Senayan, Jakarta, Indonesia	(Indonesia) Hadibowo Susanto	(Indonesia) Bobby Ertanto (Indonesia) Liem Swie King	6–15, 5–15	Silver

=== World Games ===
Men's doubles
Year	Venue	Partner	Opponent	Score	Result
1981	San Jose Civic Auditorium, California, United States	(Indonesia) Kartono	(China) Yao Ximing (China) Sun Zhian	15–3, 11–15, 8–15	Bronze

=== World Masters Games ===
Men's doubles

Year	Age	Venue	Partner	Opponent	Score	Result	Ref
2009	50+	Sydney Olympic Park Sports Centre, Sydney, Australia	(Indonesia) Simbarsono Sutanto	(Thailand) Surapong Suharitdumrong (Thailand) Taveesup Waranusast	7–15, 15–5, 15–6	Gold	

=== World Senior Championships ===
Men's doubles

Year	Age	Venue	Partner	Opponent	Score	Result	Ref
2025	70+	Eastern National Sports Training Centre, Pattaya, Thailand	(Indonesia) Frits Hermanus Mainaky	(Thailand) Attakorn Maensamut (Thailand) Jiamsak Panitchaikul	19–21, 14–21	Bronze	

=== SEA Games ===
Men's doubles
Year	Venue	Partner	Opponent	Score	Result
1981	Camp Crame Gymnasium, Manila, Philippines	(Indonesia) Kartono	(Malaysia) Jalani Sidek (Malaysia) Razif Sidek	15–12, 15–6	Gold
1987	Kuningan Hall, Jakarta, Indonesia	(Indonesia) Bobby Ertanto	(Thailand) Sawei Chanseorasmee (Thailand) Sakrapee Thongsari	13–15, 7–15	Bronze

=== International tournaments ===
Men's doubles
Year	Tournament	Partner	Opponent	Score	Result
1979	India Open	(Indonesia) Kartono	(Indonesia) Dhany Sartika (Indonesia) Hadiyanto	15–1, 15–11	(gold) Winner
1981	Copenhagen Cup	(Indonesia) Kartono	(Sweden) Thomas Kihlström (Sweden) Stefan Karlsson	10–15, 15–12, 15–17	(silver) Runner-up
1981	All England	(Indonesia) Kartono	(Indonesia) Tjun Tjun (Indonesia) Johan Wahjudi	15–9, 15–8	(gold) Winner
1981	India Open	(Indonesia) Kartono	(Sweden) Thomas Kihlström (Sweden) Stefan Karlsson	15–6, 8–15, 15–17	(silver) Winner
1982	Hong Kong Open	(Indonesia) Kartono	(Sweden) Thomas Kihlström (Sweden) Stefan Karlsson	15–3, 15–6	(gold) Winner
1982	Indonesia Open	(Indonesia) Kartono	(Indonesia) Christian Hadinata (Denmark) Jens Peter Nierhoff	15–1, 10–15, 15–2	(gold) Winner
1982	Japan Open	(Indonesia) Kartono	(England) Mike Tredgett (England) Martin Dew	9–15, 15–7, 18–14	(gold) Winner
1983	Indonesia Open	(Indonesia) Kartono	(Indonesia) Christian Hadinata (Indonesia) Bobby Ertanto	15–9, 18–14	(gold) Winner
1983	Scandinavian Cup	(Indonesia) Kartono	(England) Mike Tredgett (England) Martin Dew	12–15, 18–16, 15–11	(gold) Winner
1983	Holland Masters	(Indonesia) Kartono	(Malaysia) Jalani Sidek (Malaysia) Razif Sidek	15–4, 15–9	(gold) Winner
1983	Japan Open	(Malaysia) Razif Sidek	(Sweden) Thomas Kihlström (Sweden) Stefan Karlsson	14–18, 15–6, 6–15	(silver) Runner-up
1984	All England	(Indonesia) Kartono	(England) Mike Tredgett (England) Martin Dew	15–11, 15–6	(gold) Winner
1984	Indonesia Open	(Indonesia) Kartono	(Indonesia) Christian Hadinata (Indonesia) Hadibowo Susanto	15–10, 13–18, 7–15	(silver) Runner-up
1985	Chinese Taipei Open	(Indonesia) Kartono	(Denmark) Mark Christiansen (Denmark) Michael Kjeldsen	18–17, 8–15, 18–17	(gold) Winner
1985	Thailand Open	(Indonesia) Bobby Ertanto	(Denmark) Mark Christiansen (Denmark) Michael Kjeldsen	15–9, 15–8	(gold) Winner
1986	Japan Open	(Indonesia) Bobby Ertanto	(Malaysia) Jalani Sidek (Malaysia) Razif Sidek	11–15, 2–15	(silver) Runner-up
1986	Hong Kong Open	(Indonesia) Bobby Ertanto	(Malaysia) Ong Beng Teong (Malaysia) Jalani Sidek	15–7, 15–6	(gold) Winner
1986	Malaysia Open	(Indonesia) Bobby Ertanto	(Malaysia) Jalani Sidek (Malaysia) Razif Sidek	10–15, 15–11, 10–15	(silver) Runner-up
1987	Singapore Open	(Indonesia) Hadibowo Susanto	(Indonesia) Liem Swie King (Indonesia) Bobby Ertanto	2–15, 4–15	(silver) Runner-up
1987	All England	(Indonesia) Bobby Ertanto	(China) Li Yongbo (China) Tian Bingyi	9–15, 8–15	(silver) Runner-up
1987	French Open	(Indonesia) Hadibowo Susanto	(South Korea) Kim Moon-soo (South Korea) Lee Deuk-choon	0–15, 14–17	(silver) Runner-up
1987	Indonesia Open	(Indonesia) Bobby Ertanto	(Indonesia) Eddy Hartono (Indonesia) Liem Swie King	6–15, 8–15	(silver) Runner-up

Mixed doubles
Year	Tournament	Partner	Opponent	Score	Result
1979	India Open	(Indonesia) Ivana Lie	(Indonesia) Kartono (Indonesia) Tjan So Gwan	9–15, 2–15	(silver) Runner-up
