= Hadibowo Susanto =

Indonesian badminton player (1958–2011)

Personal information
- Born: 4 July 1958 Tegal, Central Java, Indonesia
- Died: 7 June 2011 (aged 52) Jakarta, Indonesia

Sport
- Country: Indonesia
- Sport: Badminton
- Handedness: Right
- Event: Men's doubles
Medal record
Men's Badminton
Representing Indonesia
World Cup
Bronze medal – third place	1984 Jakarta	Men's doubles
Bronze medal – third place	1985 Jakarta	Men's doubles
Silver medal – second place	1986 Bandung-Jakarta	Men's doubles
Thomas Cup
Gold medal – first place	1984 Kuala Lumpur	Men's team
Silver medal – second place	1986 Jakarta	Men's team
Bronze medal – third place	1988 Kuala Lumpur	Men's team
Asian Games
Bronze medal – third place	1986 Seoul	Men's team
Asian Championships
Bronze medal – third place	1983 Calcutta	Men's doubles
Bronze medal – third place	1983 Calcutta	Mixed doubles
SEA Games
Gold medal – first place	1983 Singapore	Men's team
Silver medal – second place	1983 Singapore	Men's doubles

Hadibowo Susanto (4 July 1958 – 7 June 2011) was an Indonesian badminton player.

== Career ==
A men's doubles specialist, Hadibowo teamed with veteran doubles maestro Christian Hadinata to win the Indonesia and Thailand Opens in 1984. In the 1984 Thomas Cup (men's international team championship) series, Hadibowo and Hadinata defeated their final round Chinese opponents, contributing to Indonesia's three matches to two victory. They also won their final round match against China in the 1986 Thomas Cup series, but this time in a two matches to three loss.

== Achievements ==
=== World Cup ===
Men's doubles
Year	Venue	Partner	Opponent	Score	Result
1984	Istora Senayan, Jakarta, Indonesia	(Indonesia) Christian Hadinata	(Indonesia) Kartono (Indonesia) Liem Swie King	13–15, 10–15	Bronze
1985	Istora Senayan, Jakarta, Indonesia	(Indonesia) Bobby Ertanto	(China) Li Yongbo (China) Tian Bingyi	7–15, 12–15	Bronze
1986	Istora Senayan, Jakarta, Indonesia	(Indonesia) Rudy Heryanto	(Indonesia) Bobby Ertanto (Indonesia) Liem Swie King	6–15, 5–15	Silver

=== Asian Championships ===
Men's doubles
Year	Venue	Partner	Opponent	Score	Result
1983	Netaji Indoor Stadium, Calcutta, India	(Indonesia) Hafid Yusuf	(South Korea) Sung Han-kook (South Korea) Yoo Byung-hwan	9–15, 15–6, 1–15	Bronze

Mixed doubles
Year	Venue	Partner	Opponent	Score	Result
1983	Netaji Indoor Stadium, Calcutta, India	(Indonesia) Maria Fransisca	(South Korea) Park Joo-bong (South Korea) Kim Yun-ja	4–15, 5–15	Bronze

=== Southeast Asian Games ===
Men's doubles
Year	Venue	Partner	Opponent	Score	Result
1983	Singapore Badminton Hall, Singapore	(Indonesia) Liem Swie King	(Indonesia) Bobby Ertanto (Indonesia) Christian Hadinata	15–8, 9–15, 5–15	Silver

=== International tournaments ===
The World Badminton Grand Prix sanctioned by International Badminton Federation (IBF) from 1983 to 2006.

Men's doubles
Year	Tournament	Partner	Opponent	Score	Result
1980	Chinese Taipei Open	(Indonesia) Bobby Ertanto	(Denmark) Flemming Delfs (Denmark) Steen Skovgaard	18–13, 15–5	(gold) Winner
1981	Swedish Open	(Indonesia) Bobby Ertanto	(Sweden) Stefan Karlsson (Sweden) Thomas Kihlström	6–15, 4–15	(silver) Runner-up
1982	Chinese Taipei Open	(Indonesia) Bobby Ertanto	(England) Martin Dew (England) Mike Tredgett	6–15, 15–11, 11–15	(silver) Runner-up
1983	Chinese Taipei Open	(Indonesia) Bobby Ertanto	(Sweden) Stefan Karlsson (Sweden) Thomas Kihlström	15–9, 15–11	(gold) Winner
1984	Thailand Open	(Indonesia) Christian Hadinata	(Malaysia) Ong Beng Teong (Malaysia) Razif Sidek	15–13, 15–11	(gold) Winner
1984	Indonesia Open	(Indonesia) Christian Hadinata	(Indonesia) Rudy Heryanto (Indonesia) Kartono	10–15, 18–13, 15–7	(gold) Winner
1984	English Masters	(Indonesia) Christian Hadinata	(Denmark) Morten Frost (Denmark) Jens Peter Nierhoff	15–3, 15–3	(gold) Winner
1984	Dutch Masters	(Indonesia) Christian Hadinata	(China) Ding Qiqing (China) Jiang Guoliang	15–9, 15–10	(gold) Winner
1985	Japan Open	(Indonesia) Christian Hadinata	(South Korea) Kim Moon-soo (South Korea) Park Joo-bong	16–17, 2–15	(silver) Runner-up
1986	World Grand Prix Finals	(Indonesia) Eddy Hartono	(Malaysia) Jalani Sidek (Malaysia) Razif Sidek	15–10, 5–15, 13–18	(silver) Runner-up
1987	French Open	(Indonesia) Rudy Heryanto	(South Korea) Kim Moon-soo (South Korea) Lee Deuk-choon	0–15, 14–17	(silver) Runner-up
1987	Singapore Open	(Indonesia) Rudy Heryanto	(Indonesia) Bobby Ertanto (Indonesia) Liem Swie King	2–15, 4–15	(silver) Runner-up

IBF Grand Prix tournament
IBF Grand Prix Finals tournament
