= Ong Beng Teong =

Malaysian badminton player

Ong Beng Teong 王明忠
Personal information
- Born: 29 May 1962 (age 64) Kuala Lumpur, Selangor, Federation of Malaya

Sport
- Country: Malaysia
- Sport: Badminton
- Handedness: Right
- Event: Men's & Mixed doubles

Men's & Mixed doubles
- BWF profile
Medal record
Representing Malaysia
Men's badminton
Thomas Cup
Silver medal – second place	1988 Kuala Lumpur	Team
Bronze medal – third place	1986 Jakarta	Team
Commonwealth Games
Gold medal – first place	1982 Brisbane	Men's doubles
Asian Championships
Silver medal – second place	1985 Kuala Lumpur	Men's team
Southeast Asian Games
Silver medal – second place	1983 Singapore	Men's team
Silver medal – second place	1985 Bangkok	Men's team
Bronze medal – third place	1983 Singapore	Men's doubles
Bronze medal – third place	1985 Bangkok	Men's singles

Ong Beng Teong BSD (Chinese: 王明忠; born 29 May 1962) is a former badminton player from Malaysia.

== Career ==
Ong won the gold medal at the 1982 Commonwealth Games in the men's doubles together with Razif Sidek. In the 1988 Thomas Cup he represented Malaysia and reached with the team the final of the cup. In the final he played the men's doubles with Cheah Soon Kit and lost with him to the Chinese pair Chen Kang and Chen Hongyong 12–15 and 12–15.

== Personal life ==
Ong is the head coach and founder of Pro Badminton Academy, a badminton training academy running in both Kuala Lumpur and Melbourne, Australia. His three children currently live in Melbourne.

== Achievements ==
=== Southeast Asian Games ===
Men's singles
Year	Venue	Opponent	Score	Result
1985	Chulalongkorn University Indoor Stadium, Bangkok, Thailand	(Indonesia) Icuk Sugiarto	5–15, 6–15	Bronze

Men's doubles
Year	Venue	Partner	Opponent	Score	Result
1983	Singapore Badminton Hall, Singapore	(Malaysia) Soh Goon Chup	(Indonesia) Christian Hadinata (Indonesia) Bobby Ertanto	15–8, 7–15, 6–15	Bronze

=== Commonwealth Games ===
Men's doubles
Year	Venue	Partner	Opponent	Score	Result
1982	Chandler Sports Hall, Brisbane, Australia	(Malaysia) Razif Sidek	(England) Martin Dew (England) Nick Yates	15–10, 17–15	Gold

=== IBF World Grand Prix ===
The World Badminton Grand Prix sanctioned by International Badminton Federation (IBF) from 1983 to 2006.

Men's doubles
Year	Tournament	Partner	Opponent	Score	Result
1984	Thailand Open	(Malaysia) Razif Sidek	(Indonesia) Christian Hadinata (Indonesia) Hadibowo	13–15, 11–15	(silver) Runner-up
1986	Hong Kong Open	(Malaysia) Jalani Sidek	(Indonesia) Rudy Heryanto (Indonesia) Bobby Ertanto	7–15, 6–15	(silver) Runner-up
1988	Swiss Open	(Malaysia) Cheah Soon Kit	(Malaysia) Rahman Sidek (Malaysia) Ong Ewe Chye	15–9, 15–6	(gold) Winner
1988	Poona Open	(Malaysia) Cheah Soon Kit	(Denmark) Michael Kjeldsen (Denmark) Jens Peter Nierhoff	10–15, 15–10, 6–15	(silver) Runner-up
1989	Swiss Open	(Malaysia) Cheah Soon Kit	(China) Zhang Qiang (China) Zhou Jincan	15–9, 5–15, 15–7	(gold) Winner

== Honours ==
- Malaysia:
  - Herald of the Order of Loyalty to the Royal Family of Malaysia (B.S.D) (1988)
