= Badminton at the 1982 Asian Games – Women's team =

Women's team at the 1982 Asian Games
- Venue: Indraprashtha Indoor Stadium
- Dates: 25–27 November
- Nations: 5

Medalists
gold medal	China; Li Lingwei, Lin Ying, Wu Dixi, Wu Jianqiu, Xu Rong, Zhang Ailing
silver medal	Japan; Kimiko Jinnai, Sumiko Kitada, Kazuko Takamine, Fumiko Tōkairin, Atsuko Tokuda, Yoshiko Yonekura
bronze medal	South Korea; Hwang Sun-ai, Kang Haeng-suk, Kim Yun-ja, Song Eun-joo, Yoo Sang-hee
bronze medal	India; Vandana Chiplunkar, Ami Ghia, Madhumita Goswami, Amita Kulkarni, Hufrish Nariman, Kanwal Thakar Singh

The badminton women's team tournament at the 1982 Asian Games in New Delhi took place from 25 September to 27 November.

It was the first time that the India women's badminton team won a team medal.

== Schedule ==
All times are Indian Standard Time (UTC+05:30)

Date	Event
25 November	Quarter-finals
26 November	Semi-finals
27 November	Final

== Results ==
Quarterfinals		Semifinals		Final
		China	4
South Korea	4	South Korea	1
Indonesia	1			China	5
				Japan	0
		Japan	4
		India	1

=== Quarterfinals ===
25 September	South Korea	4–1	Indonesia

Kim Yun-ja	2–1	Verawaty Fadjrin	7–11, 11–8, 11–0
Song Eun-joo	0–2	Taty Sumirah	9–12, 2–11
Hwang Sun-ai / Kang Haeng-suk	2–1	Ruth Damayanti / Verawaty Fadjrin	15–2, 3–15, 15–11
Kim Yun-ja / Yoo Sang-hee	2–0	Maria Fransisca / Theresia Widiastuti	15–11, 15–7
Yoo Sang-hee	2–0	Elizabeth Latief	11–2, 11–2

=== Semi-finals ===
26 September	China	4–1	South Korea

Zhang Ailing	2–0	Yoo Sang-hee	11–3, 11–5
Li Lingwei	2–0	Kim Yun-ja	11–4, 11–9
Lin Ying / Wu Dixi	2–0	Hwang Sun-ai / Kang Haeng-suk	15–11, 15–0
Wu Jianqiu	2–0	Song Eun-joo	11–9, 11–1
Wu Jianqiu / Xu Rong	0–2	Kim Yun-ja / Yoo Sang-hee	Walkover

26 September	Japan	4–1	India

Sumiko Kitada	2–0	Ami Ghia	11–0, 11–4
Fumiko Tōkairin	2–0	Vandana Chiplunkar	11–3, 11–5
Sumiko Kitada / Kimiko Jinnai	2–0	Madhumita Goswami / Amita Kulkarni	15–7, 15–10
Atsuko Tokuda / Yoshiko Yonekura	2–0	Ami Ghia / Kanwal Thakar Singh	15–4, 15–5
Yoshiko Yonekura	0–2	Hufrish Nariman	Walkover

=== Final ===
27 September	China	5–0	Japan

Zhang Ailing	2–0	Sumiko Kitada	11–4, 11–3
Li Lingwei	2–0	Fumiko Tōkairin	11–6, 11–4
Lin Ying / Wu Dixi	2–0	Atsuko Tokuda / Yoshiko Yonekura	15–3, 15–7
Wu Jianqiu / Xu Rong	2–0	Sumiko Kitada / Kimiko Jinnai	15–4, 18–13
Wu Jianqiu	2–0	Yoshiko Yonekura	11–5, 11–0
