= 1983 IBF World Championships – Women's doubles =

Women's doubles at the 1983 IBF World Championships
- Venue: Brøndbyhallen
- Location: Copenhagen, Denmark
- Dates: May 2, 1983 – May 8, 1983

Medalists
gold medal	Lin Ying; Wu Dixi	China
silver medal	Nora Perry; Jane Webster	England
bronze medal	Wu Jianqiu; Xu Rong	China
bronze medal	Gillian Clark; Gillian Gilks	England

The 1983 IBF World Championships (World Badminton Championships) were held in Copenhagen, Denmark, in 1983. Below are the results of the women's doubles.

== Main stage ==
=== Section 1 ===
First round
(China) Lin Ying (China) Wu Dixi
(Peru) Carmen Bellido (Peru) Ximena Bellido
(Switzerland) Eliane Huldi (Switzerland) Silvia Lüthi
(South Korea) Kim Yun-ja (South Korea) Yoo Sang-hee
(Japan) Atsuko Tokuda (Japan) Yoshiko Yonekura

Second round
(China) Lin Ying (China) Wu Dixi
(Peru) Carmen Bellido (Peru) Ximena Bellido	15	15
(Switzerland) Eliane Huldi (Switzerland) Silvia Lüthi	11	7
(South Korea) Kim Yun-ja (South Korea) Yoo Sang-hee
(Japan) Atsuko Tokuda (Japan) Yoshiko Yonekura

Third round
(China) Lin Ying (China) Wu Dixi	15	15
(Peru) Carmen Bellido (Peru) Ximena Bellido	4	0
(South Korea) Kim Yun-ja (South Korea) Yoo Sang-hee	15	15
(Japan) Atsuko Tokuda (Japan) Yoshiko Yonekura	5	13

Quarterfinals
(China) Lin Ying (China) Wu Dixi	18	15
(South Korea) Kim Yun-ja (South Korea) Yoo Sang-hee	13	7

=== Section 2 ===
First round
(England) Gillian Clark (England) Gillian Gilks
(Denmark) Anne Skovgaard (Denmark) Pia Nielsen
(Scotland) Pamela Hamilton (Scotland) Christine Heatly
(Canada) Johanne Falardeau (Canada) Claire Backhouse
(Sweden) Maria Bengtsson (Sweden) Christine Magnusson
(Germany) Mechtild Hagemann (Germany) Kirsten Schmieder
(Wales) Sian Williams (Wales) Linda Blake

Second round
(England) Gillian Clark (England) Gillian Gilks
(Denmark) Anne Skovgaard (Denmark) Pia Nielsen	15	15
(Scotland) Pamela Hamilton (Scotland) Christine Heatly	4	4
(Canada) Johanne Falardeau (Canada) Claire Backhouse	15	15	1715
(Sweden) Maria Bengtsson (Sweden) Christine Magnusson	18	11	15
(Germany) Mechtild Hagemann (Germany) Kirsten Schmieder	15	15
(Wales) Sian Williams (Wales) Linda Blake	8	7

Third round
(England) Gillian Clark (England) Gillian Gilks	15	15
(Denmark) Anne Skovgaard (Denmark) Pia Nielsen	2	7
(Canada) Johanne Falardeau (Canada) Claire Backhouse	15	15
(Germany) Mechtild Hagemann (Germany) Kirsten Schmieder	8	9

Quarterfinals
(England) Gillian Clark (England) Gillian Gilks	15	15
(Canada) Johanne Falardeau (Canada) Claire Backhouse	3	3

=== Section 3 ===
First round
(England) Jane Webster (England) Nora Perry
(Japan) Sumiko Kitada (Japan) Kimiko Jinnai
(India) Radhika Bose (India) Ami Ghia
(South Korea) Hwang Sun-ai (South Korea) Kang Haeng-suk
(Netherlands) Joke van Beusekom (Netherlands) Karin van the Valk
(Denmark) Dorte Kjær (Denmark) Nettie Nielsen
(Switzerland) Liselotte Blumer (Germany) Eva-Maria Zwiebler

Second round
(England) Jane Webster (England) Nora Perry
(Japan) Sumiko Kitada (Japan) Kimiko Jinnai	15	15
(India) Radhika Bose (India) Ami Ghia	8	6
(South Korea) Hwang Sun-ai (South Korea) Kang Haeng-suk	15	15
(Netherlands) Joke van Beusekom (Netherlands) Karin van the Valk	8	6
(Denmark) Dorte Kjær (Denmark) Nettie Nielsen	15	15
(Switzerland) Liselotte Blumer (Germany) Eva-Maria Zwiebler	5	7

Third round
(England) Jane Webster (England) Nora Perry	15	15
(Japan) Sumiko Kitada (Japan) Kimiko Jinnai	9	9
(South Korea) Hwang Sun-ai (South Korea) Kang Haeng-suk	17	15
(Denmark) Dorte Kjær (Denmark) Nettie Nielsen	15	5

Quarterfinals
(England) Jane Webster (England) Nora Perry	18	15
(South Korea) Hwang Sun-ai (South Korea) Kang Haeng-suk	17	9

=== Section 4 ===
First round
(China) Wu Jianqiu (China) Xu Rong
(Chinese Taipei) Sherry Liu (Sweden) Carina Andersson
(Indonesia) Ruth Damayanti (Indonesia) Maria Fransisca
(Australia) Audrey Swaby (Australia) Julie McDonald
(Canada) Linda Cloutier (Canada) Denyse Julien
(Iceland) Kristin Magnusdottir (Iceland) Þórdís Edwald

Second round
(China) Wu Jianqiu (China) Xu Rong
(Chinese Taipei) Sherry Liu (Sweden) Carina Andersson
(Indonesia) Ruth Damayanti (Indonesia) Maria Fransisca	15	15
(Australia) Audrey Swaby (Australia) Julie McDonald	7	9
(Canada) Linda Cloutier (Canada) Denyse Julien	15	15
(Iceland) Kristin Magnusdottir (Iceland) Þórdís Edwald	4	0

Third round
(China) Wu Jianqiu (China) Xu Rong	15	15
(Chinese Taipei) Sherry Liu (Sweden) Carina Andersson	3	3
(Indonesia) Ruth Damayanti (Indonesia) Maria Fransisca	15	15
(Canada) Linda Cloutier (Canada) Denyse Julien

Quarterfinals
(China) Wu Jianqiu (China) Xu Rong	15	15
(Indonesia) Ruth Damayanti (Indonesia) Maria Fransisca	12	10

== Final stage ==
Quarterfinals
(China) Lin Ying (China) Wu Dixi	18	15
(South Korea) Kim Yun-ja (South Korea) Yoo Sang-hee	13	7
(England) Gillian Clark (England) Gillian Gilks	15	15
(Canada) Johanne Falardeau (Canada) Claire Backhouse	3	3
(England) Jane Webster (England) Nora Perry	18	15
(South Korea) Hwang Sun-ai (South Korea) Kang Haeng-suk	17	9
(China) Wu Jianqiu (China) Xu Rong	15	15
(Indonesia) Ruth Damayanti (Indonesia) Maria Fransisca	12	10

Semifinals
(China) Lin Ying (China) Wu Dixi	15	18
(England) Gillian Clark (England) Gillian Gilks	3	17
(England) Jane Webster (England) Nora Perry	15	15
(China) Wu Jianqiu (China) Xu Rong	11	8

Finals
(China) Lin Ying (China) Wu Dixi	15	15
(England) Jane Webster (England) Nora Perry	4	12
