= 1982 All England Open Badminton Championships =

1982 All England Championships
Tournament details
- Dates: 24 March 1982– 28 March 1982
- Edition: 72nd
- Venue: Wembley Arena
- Location: London

The 1982 John Player All England Open was the 72nd edition of the All England Open Badminton Championships. It was held in 1982, in Wembley, London. During an International Badminton Federation meeting in London on March 23, 1981 it was agreed to re-elect the twenty members of the breakaway World Badminton Federation. This included China which consequently resulted in some of the world's top players returning to compete in the All England Championships.

== Final results ==
| Category | Winners | Runners-up | Score |
|---|---|---|---|
| Men's singles | (Denmark) Morten Frost | (China) Luan Jin | 11-15, 15–2, 15–7 |
| Women's singles | (China) Zhang Ailing | (China) Li Lingwei | 11–4, 11–6 |
| Men's doubles | (Malaysia) Razif Sidek & Jalani Sidek | (Scotland) Billy Gilliland & Dan Travers | 8-15, 15–9, 15–10 |
| Women's doubles | (China) Lin Ying & Wu Dixi | (Indonesia) Verawaty Wiharjo & Ruth Damayanti | 15-8, 15-5 |
| Mixed doubles | (England) Martin Dew & Gillian Gilks | (Scotland) Billy Gilliland & Karen Chapman | 15-10, 14–17, 15–7 |

== Results ==
=== Men's singles ===
==== Section 1 ====
Round of 32
(Denmark) Morten Frost | 15 | 15
(Sweden) Stefan Karlsson | 8 | 4
(Indonesia) Dhany Sartika | 15 | 15
(China) Jiang Guoliang | 10 | 4
(China) Han Jian | 15 | 15
(Pakistan) Tariq Wadood | 6 | 2
(Indonesia) Hastomo Arbi | 15 | 15
(Denmark) Torben Carlsen | 4 | 4
(Indonesia) Liem Swie King | 15 | 15
(China) Li Yongbo | 5 | 5
(Malaysia) Misbun Sidek | 15 | 15
(Wales) Philip Sutton | 13 | 13
(China) Chen Changjie | 15 | 15
(England) Nick Yates | 7 | 4
(India) Syed Modi | 15 | 15
(Indonesia) Eddy Kurniawan | 3 | 7

Round of 16
(Denmark) Frost | 15 | 15
(Indonesia) Sartika | 9 | 3
(China) Han Jian | 15 | 15
(Indonesia) Arbi | 5 | 11
(Indonesia) Swie King | 15 | 15
(Malaysia) Sidek M | 3 | 9
(China) Changie | 15 | 15
(India) Modi

Quarter-finals
(Denmark) Frost | 15 | 15
(China) Han Jian | 4 | 4
(Indonesia) Swie King | 15 | 17
(China) Changie | 1 | 16

Semi-finals
(Denmark) Frost | 15 | 15
(Indonesia) Swie King | 10 | 10

==== Section 2 ====
Round of 32
(China) Luan Jin | 15 | 15
(Malaysia) Razif Sidek | 4 | 4
(England) Andy Goode | 18 | 15
(Indonesia) Gedeon Kurniahu | 14 | 9
(China) He Shangquan | 15 | 15
(England) Ray Stevens | 5 | 11
(Sweden) Thomas Kihlström | 15 | 8 | 15
(Indonesia) Hadiyanto | 11 | 15 | 12
(India) Prakash Padukone | 15 | 15
(England) Kevin Jolly | 10 | 10
(China) Tian Bingyi | 15 | 15
(Denmark) Claus Thomsen | 10 | 3
(China) Chen Tianlung | 15 | 15
(Indonesia) Serian Wijatno | 4 | 1
(Denmark) Flemming Delfs | 15 | 15
(England) Stephen Butler | 3 | 3

Round of 16
(China) Luan Jin | 15 | 15
(England) Goode | 12 | 8
(China) He Shangquan | 15 | 15
(Sweden) Kihlström | 5 | 11
(India) Padukone | 15 | 15
(China) Bingyi | 6 | 1
(China) Tianlung | 8 | 15 | 15
(Denmark) Delfs | 15 | 2 | 2

Quarter-finals
(China) Luan Jin | 15 | 15
(China) He Shangquan | 12 | 6
(India) Padukone | 15 | 15
(China) Tianlung | 3 | 12

Semi-finals
(China) Luan Jin | 15 | 15
(India) Padukone | 5 | 12

=== Women's singles ===
==== Section 1 ====
Round of 32
(China) Zhang Ailing | 11 | 11
(Denmark) Dorte Kjær | 4 | 6
(South Korea) Yoon Suk Kim | 12 | 12
(England) Karen Bridge | 10 | 10
(China) Guan Weizhen | 5 | 11 | 11
(Japan) Fumiko Tohkairin | 11 | 6 | 4
(Denmark) Nettie Nielsen | 11 | 11
(Indonesia) Maria Fransisca | 6 | 6
(China) Zheng Yuli | 11 | 11
(Taiwan) Sherry Liu | 4 | 1
(England) Helen Troke | 12 | 12
(Denmark) Rikke von Sørensen | 9 | 9
(China) Song Youping | 9 | 11 | 11
(South Korea) Hwang Sun-ai | 11 | 2 | 0
(Japan) Sumiko Kitada | 11 | 11
(Sweden) Christine Magnusson | 4 | 3

Round of 16
(China) Ailing
(South Korea) Suk Kim
(China) Weizhen
(Denmark) Nielsen
(China) Yuli
(England) Troke
(China) Youping
(Japan) Kitada

Quarter-finals
(China) Ailing | 11 | 11
(China) Weizhen | 3 | 1
(China) Yuli | 11 | 11 | 11
(China) Youping | 2 | 12 | 3

Semi-finals
(China) Ailing | 11 | 11
(China) Yuli | 3 | 3

==== Section 2 ====
Round of 32
(China) Li Lingwei | 11 | 11
(England) Diane Simpson | 5 | 3
(China) Wu Dixi | 11 | 11
(England) Wendy Massam | 2 | 2
(China) Wu Jianqiu | 11 | 11
(Japan) Kimiko Jinnai | 5 | 0
(Indonesia) Ivana Lie | 11 | 11
(Canada) Sandra Skillings | 3 | 2
(Denmark) Lene Køppen | 11 | 9 | 11
(England) Jane Webster | 3 | 12 | 3
(China) Xu Rong | 12 | 11
(Indonesia) Raith Kumala-Dewi | 9 | 0
(China) Chen Ruizhen | 11 | 11
(England) Gillian Clark | 3 | 5
(South Korea) Yeon Ja Kim | 11 | 11
(Japan) Yoshiko Yonekura | 5 | 6

Round of 16
(China) Lingwei
(China) Wu Dixi
(China) Jianqiu
(Indonesia) Ivana
(Denmark) Køppen | 11 | 11
(China) Xu Rong | 7 | 8
(China) Ruizhen
(South Korea) Ya Kim

Quarter-finals
(China) Lingwei | 11 | 11
(China) Jianqiu | 1 | 3
(Denmark) Køppen | 11 | 11
(China) Ruizhen | 3 | 6

Semi-finals
(China) Lingwei | 11 | 11
(Denmark) Køppen | 8 | 0

=== Men's doubles ===
Semifinals
(Malaysia) Razif Sidek (Malaysia) Jalani Sidek | 11 | 15 | 17
(Indonesia) Hariamanto Kartono (Indonesia) Rudy Heryanto | 15 | 4 | 16
(Scotland) Billy Gilliland (Scotland) Dan Travers | 6 | 15 | 15
(South Korea) Park Joo-bong (South Korea) Lee Eun-ku | 15 | 8 | 12

Final
(Malaysia) Razif Sidek (Malaysia) Jalani Sidek | 8 | 15 | 15
(Scotland) Billy Gilliland (Scotland) Dan Travers | 15 | 9 | 10

=== Women's doubles ===
Semifinals
(China) Lin Ying (China) Wu Dixi | 15 | 15
(England) Nora Perry (England) Jane Webster | 12 | 10
(Indonesia) Verawaty Wiharjo (Indonesia) Ruth Damayanti | 15 | 15
(China) Zhang Ailing (China) Liu Xia | 6 | 13

Final
(China) Lin Ying (China) Wu Dixi | 15 | 15
(Indonesia) Verawaty Wiharjo (Indonesia) Ruth Damayanti | 8 | 5

=== Mixed doubles ===
Semifinals
(Scotland) Billy Gilliland (Scotland) Karen Chapman | 17 | 8 | 15
(England) Mike Tredgett (England) Nora Perry | 14 | 15 | 6
(England) Martin Dew (England) Gillian Gilks | 15 | 15
(China) Tian Bingyi (China) Guan Weizhen | 6 | 8

Final
(Scotland) Billy Gilliland (Scotland) Karen Chapman | 10 | 17 | 7
(England) Martin Dew (England) Gillian Gilks | 15 | 14 | 15
