= 1981 All England Open Badminton Championships =

1981 All England Championships
Tournament details
- Dates: 25 March 1981– 29 March 1981
- Edition: 71st
- Venue: Wembley Arena
- Location: London

The 1981 John Player All England Open Badminton Championships was the 71st edition of the event. It was held between March 25 and March 29, 1981, in London.

== Final results ==
Category	Winners	Runners-up	Score
Men's singles	(Indonesia) Liem Swie King	(India) Prakash Padukone	11-15, 15–4, 15–6
Women's singles	(South Korea) Hwang Sun-ai	(Denmark) Lene Køppen	11–1, 11–2
Men's doubles	(Indonesia) Rudy Heryanto & Hariamanto Kartono	(Indonesia) Tjun Tjun & Johan Wahjudi	15–9, 15–8
Women's doubles	(England) Jane Webster & Nora Perry	(England) Gillian Gilks & Paula Kilvington	15-8, 15-4
Mixed doubles	(England) Mike Tredgett & Nora Perry	(Indonesia) Christian Hadinata & Imelda Wiguna	15-10, 14–18, 15–10

=== Men's singles ===
==== Seeds ====
1. (Indonesia) Liem Swie King
2. (Indonesia) Rudy Hartono
3. (Indonesia) Lius Pongoh
4. (Denmark) Morten Frost
5. (Indonesia) Hadiyanto
6. (India) Prakash Padukone
7. (England) Ray Stevens
8. (England) Kevin Jolly

==== Section 1 ====
Round of 32
(Indonesia) Liem Swie King	15	15
(England) Andy Goode	5	9
(India) Syed Modi	15	18
(Denmark) Michael Kjeldsen	11	16
(England) Kevin Jolly	15	15
(India) Sanjay Sharma	2	6
(Japan) Kinji Zeniya	15	15
(Indonesia) Tjokaykie	3	11
(Denmark) Morten Frost	15	15
(Mexico) Roy Diaz Gonzalez	6	6
(England) Gary Scott	15	5	15
(Japan) Yoshitaka Iino	12	15	12
(Indonesia) Hadiyanto	15	15
(Czech Republic) John Czich	4	3
(Denmark) Gert Helsholt	15	15
(Scotland) Dan Travers	9	4

Round of 16
(Indonesia) Swie King	15	15
(India) Modi	10	7
(England) Jolly	15	15
(Japan) Zeniya	12	6
(Denmark) Frost	15	15
(England) Scott	5	3
(Indonesia) Hadiyanto	15	15
(Denmark) Helsholt	5	9

Quarter-finals
(Indonesia) Swie King	15	15
(England) Jolly	2	9
(Denmark) Frost	15	15
(Indonesia) Hadiyanto	8	4

Semi-finals
(Indonesia) Swie King	8	15	15
(Denmark) Frost	15	8	5

==== Section 2 ====
Round of 32
(India) Prakash Padukone	15	15
(Denmark) Ulf Johansson	7	5
(Indonesia) Icuk Sugiarto	15	10	15
(Japan) Hiroyuki Hasegawa	10	15	6
(Indonesia) Lius Pongoh	15	15
(England) Nick Yates	9	4
(Thailand) Udom Luangpetcharaporn	15	15
(Denmark) Svend Pri	12	9
(Indonesia) Dhany Sartika	15	15
(England) Ray Stevens	10	11
(Denmark) Kenneth Larsen	15	15
(Wales) Philip Sutton	10	7
(Indonesia) Rudy Hartono	15	15
(England) Paul Whetnall	8	6
(Malaysia) Misbun Sidek	15	15
(Japan) Masao Tsuchida	13	8

Round of 16
(India) Padukone	15	15
(Indonesia) Sugiarto	6	10
(Indonesia) Pongoh	15	15
(Thailand) Luangpetcharaporn	4	7
(Indonesia) Sartika	9	15	15
(Denmark) Larsen	15	5	7
(Indonesia) Hartono	15	15
(Malaysia) Sidek	4	11

Quarter-finals
(India) Padukone	15	15
(Indonesia) Pongoh	8	7
(Indonesia) Sartika	11	15
(Indonesia) Hartono	2	15

Semi-finals
(India) Padukone	10	15	15
(Indonesia) Hartono	15	7	8

=== Women's singles ===
==== Seeds ====
1. (Denmark) Lene Køppen
2. (South Korea) Hwang Sun-ai
3. (Indonesia) Ivana Lie
4. (Japan) Atsuko Tokuda
5. (Indonesia) Verawaty Wiharjo
6. (Japan) Yoshiko Yonekura
7. (England) Jane Webster
8. (Canada) Wendy Carter

==== Section 1 ====
Round of 32
(Denmark) Lene Køppen	10	11	11
(Japan) Saori Kondo	12	9	3
(England) Mary Leeves	11	11	11
(Indonesia) Taty Sumirah	13	7	3
(England) Karen Bridge	11	11
(Canada) Wendy Carter	3	6
(Japan) Kimiko Jinnai	11	11
(Indonesia) Tjan So Gwan	9	3
(Indonesia) Verawaty Wiharjo	11	11
(Japan) Fumiko Tohkairin	2	2
(Guernsey) Sally Leadbeater	6	11	11
(Denmark) Nettie Nielsen	11	4	7
(South Korea) Kim Yun-ja	11	12
(Japan) Atsuko Tokuda	6	10
(Denmark) Pia Nielsen	11	11
(Switzerland) Liselotte Blumer	5	7

Round of 16
(Denmark) Køppen	11	11
(England) Leeves	1	6
(England) Bridge	11	11
(Japan) Jinnai	8	5
(Indonesia) Verawaty	11	7	11
(Guernsey) Leadbeater	6	11	8
(South Korea) Kim	11	11
(Denmark) Nielsen	4	7

Quarter-finals
(Denmark) Køppen	11	11
(England) Bridge	1	3
(Indonesia) Verawaty	11	6	11
(South Korea) Kim	7	11	6

Semi-finals
(Denmark) Køppen	11	10	11
(Indonesia) Verawaty	8	12	9

==== Section 2 ====
Round of 32
(Indonesia) Ivana Lie	11	3	11
(Republic of Ireland) Diane Underwood	4	11	8
(India) Ami Ghia	11	5	12
(Denmark) Kirsten Larsen	6	11	10
(Japan) Yoshiko Yonekura	11	11
(Denmark) Dorte Kjær	1	6
(England) Helen Troke	11	11
(Canada) Jane Youngberg	5	8
(South Korea) Hwang Sun-ai	11	11
(England) Paula Kilvington	3	4
(Japan) Sumiko Kitada	11	11
(Indonesia) P Novianti	7	4
(England) Jane Webster	11	11
(Denmark) Lotte Hartwich	4	8
(Soviet Union) Svetlana Belyasova	12	8	11
(Denmark) Rikke von Sørensen	10	11	6

Round of 16
(Indonesia) Ivana	11	11
(India) Ghia	1	3
(Japan) Yonekura	11	4	11
(England) Troke	6	11	6
(South Korea) Hwang Sun-ai	11	11
(Japan) Kitada	1	2
(England) Webster	11	11
(Soviet Union) Belyasova	2	0

Quarter-finals
(Indonesia) Ivana	12	11
(Japan) Yonekura	11	7
(South Korea) Hwang Sun-ai	11	12
(England) Webster	6	10

Semi-finals
(Indonesia) Ivana	11	7	0
(South Korea) Hwang Sun-ai	5	11	11

=== Men's doubles ===
Semifinals
(Indonesia) Christian Hadinata (Indonesia) Ade Chandra	12	15	12
(Indonesia) Hariamanto Kartono (Indonesia) Rudy Heryanto	15	5	15
(Sweden) Thomas Kihlström (Sweden) Stefan Karlsson	5	15
(Indonesia) Tjun Tjun (Indonesia) Johan Wahjudi	15	17

Final
(Indonesia) Hariamanto Kartono (Indonesia) Rudy Heryanto	15	15
(Indonesia) Tjun Tjun (Indonesia) Johan Wahjudi	9	8

=== Women's doubles ===
Semifinals
(Japan) Atsuko Tokuda (Japan) Yoshiko Yonekura	18	12	15
(England) Gillian Gilks (England) Paula Kilvington	17	15	18
(South Korea) Kim Yun-ja (South Korea) Yoo Sang-hee	5	0
(England) Nora Perry (England) Jane Webster	15	15

Final
(England) Gillian Gilks (England) Paula Kilvington	8	4
(England) Nora Perry (England) Jane Webster	15	15

=== Mixed doubles ===
Semifinals
(Indonesia) Christian Hadinata (Indonesia) Imelda Wiguna	15	15
(Sweden) Thomas Kihlström (England) Gillian Gilks	9	9
(Denmark) Steen Fladberg (Denmark) Pia Nielsen	3	7
(England) Mike Tredgett (England) Nora Perry	15	15

Final
(Indonesia) Christian Hadinata (Indonesia) Imelda Wiguna	10	18	10
(England) Mike Tredgett (England) Nora Perry	15	14	15
