= 1987 IBF World Championships – Women's doubles =

Women's doubles at the 1987 IBF World Championships
- Venue: Capital Indoor Stadium
- Location: Beijing, China
- Dates: May 18, 1987 – May 24, 1987

Medalists
gold medal	Lin Ying; Guan Weizhen	China
silver medal	Li Lingwei; Han Aiping	China
bronze medal	Kim Yun-ja; Chung So-young	South Korea
bronze medal	Chung Myung-hee; Hwang Hye-young	South Korea

The 1987 IBF World Championships (World Badminton Championships) were held in Beijing, China, in 1987. Following the results of the women's doubles. (Note: Results of the first rounds incomplete.)

== Main stage ==
=== Section 1 ===
First round
(China) Lin Ying (China) Guan Weizhen
(England) Gillian Clark (England) Gillian Gowers

Second round
(China) Lin Ying (China) Guan Weizhen
(England) Gillian Clark (England) Gillian Gowers

Third round
(China) Lin Ying (China) Guan Weizhen
(England) Gillian Clark (England) Gillian Gowers

Quarterfinals
(China) Lin Ying (China) Guan Weizhen	17	17
(England) Gillian Clark (England) Gillian Gowers	16	15

=== Section 2 ===
First round
(South Korea) Kim Yun-ja (South Korea) Chung So-young
(China) Wu Jianqiu (China) Lao Yujing

Second round
(South Korea) Kim Yun-ja (South Korea) Chung So-young
(China) Wu Jianqiu (China) Lao Yujing

Third round
(South Korea) Kim Yun-ja (South Korea) Chung So-young
(China) Wu Jianqiu (China) Lao Yujing

Quarterfinals
(South Korea) Kim Yun-ja (South Korea) Chung So-young	12	15	15
(China) Wu Jianqiu (China) Lao Yujing	15	11	8

=== Section 3 ===
First round
(China) Li Lingwei (China) Han Aiping
(Indonesia) Ivana Lie (Indonesia) Rosiana Tendean
(Japan) Sumiko Kitada (Japan) Yoko Koizumi

Second round
(China) Li Lingwei (China) Han Aiping
(Indonesia) Ivana Lie (Indonesia) Rosiana Tendean
(Japan) Sumiko Kitada (Japan) Yoko Koizumi

Third round
(China) Li Lingwei (China) Han Aiping
(Indonesia) Ivana Lie (Indonesia) Rosiana Tendean	15	15
(Japan) Sumiko Kitada (Japan) Yoko Koizumi	3	6

Quarterfinals
(China) Li Lingwei (China) Han Aiping	15	15
(Indonesia) Ivana Lie (Indonesia) Rosiana Tendean	5	2

=== Section 4 ===
First round
(South Korea) Chung Myung-hee (South Korea) Hwang Hye-young
(England) Karen Beckman (England) Sara Halsall
(Sweden) Maria Bengtsson (Sweden) Christine Magnusson

Second round
(South Korea) Chung Myung-hee (South Korea) Hwang Hye-young
(England) Karen Beckman (England) Sara Halsall
(Sweden) Maria Bengtsson (Sweden) Christine Magnusson

Third round
(South Korea) Chung Myung-hee (South Korea) Hwang Hye-young	15	18
(England) Karen Beckman (England) Sara Halsall	10	14
(Sweden) Maria Bengtsson (Sweden) Christine Magnusson

Quarterfinals
(South Korea) Chung Myung-hee (South Korea) Hwang Hye-young	15	17
(Sweden) Maria Bengtsson (Sweden) Christine Magnusson	8	4

== Final stage ==
Quarterfinals
(China) Lin Ying (China) Guan Weizhen	17	17
(England) Gillian Clark (England) Gillian Gowers	16	15
(South Korea) Kim Yun-ja (South Korea) Chung So-young	12	15	15
(China) Wu Jianqiu (China) Lao Yujing	15	11	8
(China) Li Lingwei (China) Han Aiping	15	15
(Indonesia) Ivana Lie (Indonesia) Rosiana Tendean	5	2
(South Korea) Chung Myung-hee (South Korea) Hwang Hye-young	15	17
(Sweden) Maria Bengtsson (Sweden) Christine Magnusson	8	4

Semifinals
(China) Lin Ying (China) Guan Weizhen	12	15	15
(South Korea) Kim Yun-ja (South Korea) Chung So-young	15	12	4
(China) Li Lingwei (China) Han Aiping	15	6	15
(South Korea) Chung Myung-hee (South Korea) Hwang Hye-young	6	15	11

Finals
(China) Lin Ying (China) Guan Weizhen	15	15
(China) Li Lingwei (China) Han Aiping	7	8
