= Wu Dixi =

Chinese badminton player

Wu Dixi 吴迪西
Personal information
- Born: 9 August 1962 (age 64) Nanhai, Guangdong, China
- Years active: 1981-1986
- Height: 163.5 cm (5 ft 4 in)

Sport
- Country: China
- Sport: Badminton
- Handedness: Left
Medal record
Women's badminton
Representing China
World Championships
Gold medal – first place	1983 Copenhagen	Women's doubles
Silver medal – second place	1985 Calgary	Women's doubles
World Cup
Gold medal – first place	1984 Jakarta	Women's doubles
Gold medal – first place	1985 Jakarta	Women's doubles
Uber Cup
Gold medal – first place	1984 Kuala Lumpur	Women's team
Gold medal – first place	1986 Jakarta	Women's team
Asian Games
Gold medal – first place	1982 New Delhi	Women's team
Bronze medal – third place	1982 New Delhi	Women's doubles

Wu Dixi (Chinese: 吴迪西, born 1962 in Nanhai, Guangdong) is a retired Chinese female badminton player.

== Career ==
Wu was part of a cadre of Chinese players who dominated women's international badminton after China became a member of the International Badminton Federation in 1981. She won the 1982 and 1984 All-England Championships and the 1983 IBF World Championships in women's doubles with Lin Ying. Wu played on the world champion Chinese Uber Cup (women's international) teams of 1984 and 1986. She was perhaps world class badminton's most effective practitioner of the "spin serve," in which the shuttle is struck on the side of the feathers rather than on the cork—producing a highly erratic flight, until it was banned by the International Badminton Federation (now Badminton World Federation) after her first All England victory. Though primarily a doubles player, Wu won singles at both the German and Swedish Opens in 1982. She was retired from badminton in 1986 due to severe back and knee injuries.

== Post-retirement ==
Wu instantly married to an Indonesian businessman directly after retiring and moving on to Indonesia to live with her husband. In 1994, she used to coach for Malaysian women's badminton team where she addressed the unfair treatment between the male players and female players in the squad that hinders the female athletes progress. Nowadays, she is frequently handling badminton training camps in Guangzhou and more places in China.

== Achievements ==
=== World Championships ===
Women's Doubles
Year	Venue	Partner	Opponent	Score	Result
1983	Brøndby Arena, Copenhagen, Denmark	(China) Lin Ying	(England) Jane Webster (England) Nora Perry	15–4, 15–12	Gold
1985	Olympic Saddledome, Calgary, Canada	(China) Lin Ying	(China) Li Lingwei (China) Han Aiping	9–15, 18–14, 9–15	Silver

=== World Cup ===
Women's Doubles
Year	Venue	Partner	Opponent	Score	Result
1984	Istora Senayan, Jakarta, Indonesia	(China) Lin Ying	(China) Wu Jianqiu (China) Xu Rong	15–6, 7–15, 15–7	Gold
1985	Istora Senayan, Jakarta, Indonesia	(China) Lin Ying	(South Korea) Kim Yun-ja (South Korea) Yoo Sang-hee	15–4, 15–5	Gold

=== Asian Games ===
Women's Doubles
Year	Venue	Partner	Opponent	Score	Result
1982	Indraprashtha Indoor Stadium, New Delhi, India	(China) Lin Ying	(South Korea) Hwang Sun-ai (South Korea) Kang Haeng-suk	16–17, 7–15	Bronze

=== International Tournaments (5 titles, 2 runners-up) ===
Women's Singles
Year	Tournament	Opponent	Score	Result
1982	German Open	(Denmark) Kirsten Larsen	11–9, 11–3	(gold) Winner
1982	Swedish Open	(China) Wu Jianqiu	11–12, 11–2, 11–1	(gold) Winner

Women's Doubles
Year	Tournament	Partner	Opponent	Score	Result
1981	India Open	(China) Lin Ying	(England) Jane Webster (England) Nora Perry	14–17, 15–13, 15–17	(silver) Runner-up
1982	German Open	(China) Lin Ying	(China) Wu Jianqiu (China) Xu Rong	15–8, 13–15, 15–9	(gold) Winner
1982	Swedish Open	(China) Lin Ying	(China) Wu Jianqiu (China) Xu Rong	7–15, 12–15	(silver) Runner-up
1982	Denmark Open	(China) Lin Ying	(China) Wu Jianqiu (China) Xu Rong	15–12, 15–3	(gold) Winner
1982	All England Open	(China) Lin Ying	(Indonesia) Verawaty Fadjrin (Indonesia) Ruth Damyanti	15–8, 15–5	(gold) Winner

=== IBF World Grand Prix (5 titles, 3 runners-up) ===
The World Badminton Grand Prix was sanctioned by the International Badminton Federation (IBF) from 1983 to 2006.

Women's Singles
Year	Tournament	Opponent	Score	Result
1984	Scandinavian Cup	(China) Han Aiping	11–9, 2–11, 2–11	(silver) Runner-up

Women's Doubles
Year	Tournament	Partner	Opponent	Score	Result
1983	All England Open	(China) Lin Ying	(China) Wu Jianqiu (China) Xu Rong	16–18, 15–11, 6–15	(silver) Runner-up
1984	All England Open	(China) Lin Ying	(South Korea) Kim Yun-ja (South Korea) Yoo Sang-hee	15–8, 8–15, 17–14	(gold) Winner
1984	English Masters	(China) Lin Ying	(England) Gillian Clark (England) Nora Perry	15–5, 15–1	(gold) Winner
1984	Dutch Masters	(China) Lin Ying	(England) Gillian Clark (England) Nora Perry	15–4, 15–9	(gold) Winner
1984	Scandinavian Cup	(China) Lin Ying	(South Korea) Kim Yun-ja (South Korea) Yoo Sang-hee	15–1, 15–7	(gold) Winner
1985	Hong Kong Open	(China) Lin Ying	(China) Han Aiping (China) Xu Rong	4–15, 7–15	(silver) Runner-up
1985	Malaysian Masters	(China) Lin Ying	(China) Li Lingwei (China) Han Aiping	15–5, 12–15, 12–15	(silver) Runner-up
1986	Japan Open	(China) Lin Ying	(China) Li Lingwei (China) Han Aiping	15–4, 15–8	(gold) Winner
