= Lin Ying (badminton) =

Chinese badminton player (born 1963)

Lin Ying 林瑛
Personal information
- Born: 10 October 1963 (age 63) Xiamen, Fujian, China
- Years active: 1981-1989
- Height: 168 cm (5 ft 6 in)

Sport
- Country: China
- Sport: Badminton
- Handedness: Right
Medal record
Women's badminton
Representing China
World Championships
| Gold medal – first place | 1983 Copenhagen | Women's doubles |
| Gold medal – first place | 1987 Beijing | Women's doubles |
| Gold medal – first place | 1989 Jakarta | Women's doubles |
| Silver medal – second place | 1985 Calgary | Women's doubles |
| Bronze medal – third place | 1983 Copenhagen | Mixed doubles |
World Cup
| Gold medal – first place | 1984 Jakarta | Women's doubles |
| Gold medal – first place | 1985 Jakarta | Women's doubles |
| Gold medal – first place | 1988 Bangkok | Women's doubles |
| Gold medal – first place | 1989 Guangzhou | Women's doubles |
| Silver medal – second place | 1987 Kuala Lumpur | Women's doubles |
| Bronze medal – third place | 1985 Jakarta | Mixed doubles |
Sudirman Cup
| Bronze medal – third place | 1989 Jakarta | Mixed team |
Uber Cup
| Gold medal – first place | 1984 Kuala Lumpur | Women's team |
| Gold medal – first place | 1986 Jakarta | Women's team |
| Gold medal – first place | 1988 Kuala Lumpur | Women's team |
Asian Games
| Gold medal – first place | 1986 Seoul | Women's doubles |
| Gold medal – first place | 1982 New Delhi | Women's team |
| Gold medal – first place | 1986 Seoul | Women's team |
| Bronze medal – third place | 1982 New Delhi | Women's doubles |
| Bronze medal – third place | 1982 New Delhi | Mixed doubles |
| Bronze medal – third place | 1986 Seoul | Mixed doubles |

Lin Ying (Chinese: 林瑛, or Lam Ying in Cantonese, born 1963) is a Chinese former badminton player and one of the most successful doubles specialists in the sport's modern history. During her 9-year career representing China's national badminton team, she won women's doubles at many world class tournaments and played on China's dominant Uber Cup teams of the 1980s. She has been nicknamed "The Chinese Queen of Doubles" due to her formidable partnership with Guan Weizhen in the late 80's.

== Career ==
Born in Xiamen, Fujian, Lin won the gold medal in women's doubles at the IBF World Championships three times, in the 1983 with Wu Dixi, and in the 1987 and 1989 IBF World Championships with Guan Weizhen. She, Guan Weizhen and five other later Chinese players, Gao Ling and Huang Sui, Yu Yang, Chen Qingchen and Jia Yifan are the only players who have won this title at least three times. She also won the World Badminton Grand Prix in women's doubles in 1987 and 1988 with Guan Weizhen, and the prestigious All England Championship in 1982 and 1984 with Wu Dixi, in addition to many other international titles. Lin was a member of the world champion Chinese Uber Cup teams of 1984, 1986, and 1988. After her final world cup win in 1989, She retired from the sport.

== Achievements ==
=== Olympic Games (Exhibition) ===
Women's Doubles
| Year | Venue | Partner | Opponent | Score | Result |
|---|---|---|---|---|---|
| 1988 | Seoul National University Gymnasium, Seoul, South Korea | (China) Guan Weizhen | (South Korea) Chung So-young (South Korea) Kim Yun-ja | 11–15, 17–14, 5–15 | Silver |

=== World Championships ===
Women's Doubles
| Year | Venue | Partner | Opponent | Score | Result |
|---|---|---|---|---|---|
| 1983 | Brøndby Arena, Copenhagen, Denmark | (China) Wu Dixi | (England) Jane Webster (England) Nora Perry | 15–4, 15–12 | Gold |
| 1985 | Olympic Saddledome, Calgary, Canada | (China) Wu Dixi | (China) Li Lingwei (China) Han Aiping | 9–15, 18–14, 9–15 | Silver |
| 1987 | Capital Indoor Stadium, Beijing, China | (China) Guan Weizhen | (China) Li Lingwei (China) Han Aiping | 15–7, 15–8 | Gold |
| 1989 | Istora Senayan, Jakarta, Indonesia | (China) Guan Weizhen | (South Korea) Chung Myung-hee (South Korea) Hwang Hye-young | 15–1, 15–7 | Gold |

Mixed Doubles
| Year | Venue | Partner | Opponent | Score | Result |
|---|---|---|---|---|---|
| 1983 | Brøndby Arena, Copenhagen, Denmark | (China) Jiang Guoliang | (Denmark) Steen Fladberg (Denmark) Pia Nielsen | 5–15, 6–15 | Bronze |

=== World Cup ===
Women's Doubles
| Year | Venue | Partner | Opponent | Score | Result |
|---|---|---|---|---|---|
| 1984 | Istora Senayan, Jakarta, Indonesia | (China) Wu Dixi | (China) Wu Jianqiu (China) Xu Rong | 15–6, 7–15, 15–7 | Gold |
| 1985 | Istora Senayan, Jakarta, Indonesia | (China) Wu Dixi | (South Korea) Kim Yun-ja (South Korea) Yoo Sang-hee | 15–4, 15–5 | Gold |
| 1987 | Stadium Negara, Kuala Lumpur, Malaysia | (China) Guan Weizhen | (China) Li Lingwei (China) Han Aiping | 10–15, 15–11, 5–15 | Silver |
| 1988 | National Stadium, Bangkok, Thailand | (China) Guan Weizhen | (South Korea) Chung So-young (South Korea) Kim Yun-ja | 15–3, 15–7 | Gold |
| 1989 | Canton Gymnasium, Guangzhou, China | (China) Guan Weizhen | (South Korea) Chung So-young (South Korea) Hwang Hye-young | 15–2, 17–15 | Gold |

Mixed Doubles
| Year | Venue | Partner | Opponent | Score | Result |
|---|---|---|---|---|---|
| 1985 | Istora Senayan, Jakarta, Indonesia | (Denmark) Jesper Helledie | (Indonesia) Christian Hadinata (Indonesia) Ivana Lie | 16–17, 15–12, 1–15 | Bronze |

=== Asian Games ===
Women's Doubles
| Year | Venue | Partner | Opponent | Score | Result |
|---|---|---|---|---|---|
| 1982 | Indraprashtha Indoor Stadium, New Delhi, India | (China) Wu Dixi | (South Korea) Hwang Sun-ai (South Korea) Kang Haeng-suk | 16–17, 7–15 | Bronze |
| 1986 | Olympic Gymnastics Arena, Seoul, South Korea | (China) Guan Weizhen | (South Korea) Kim Yun-ja (South Korea) Yoo Sang-hee | 15–9, 8–15, 15–10 | Gold |

Mixed Doubles
| Year | Venue | Partner | Opponent | Score | Result |
|---|---|---|---|---|---|
| 1982 | Indraprashtha Indoor Stadium, New Delhi, India | (China) Lin Jiangli | (Indonesia) Icuk Sugiarto (Indonesia) Ruth Damyanti | 5–15, 8–15 | Bronze |
| 1986 | Olympic Gymnastics Arena, Seoul, South Korea | (China) Jiang Guoliang | (South Korea) Lee Deuk-choon (South Korea) Chung So-young | 9–15, 4–15 | Bronze |

=== International Tournaments (3 titles, 2 runners-up) ===
Women's Doubles
| Year | Tournament | Partner | Opponent | Score | Result |
|---|---|---|---|---|---|
| 1981 | India Open | (China) Wu Dixi | (England) Jane Webster (England) Nora Perry | 14–17, 15–13, 15–17 | (silver) Runner-up |
| 1982 | German Open | (China) Wu Dixi | (China) Wu Jianqiu (China) Xu Rong | 15–8, 13–15, 15–9 | (gold) Winner |
| 1982 | Swedish Open | (China) Wu Dixi | (China) Wu Jianqiu (China) Xu Rong | 7–15, 12–15 | (silver) Runner-up |
| 1982 | Denmark Open | (China) Wu Dixi | (China) Wu Jianqiu (China) Xu Rong | 15–12, 15–3 | (gold) Winner |
| 1982 | All England Open | (China) Wu Dixi | (Indonesia) Verawaty Fadjrin (Indonesia) Ruth Damyanti | 15–8, 15–5 | (gold) Winner |

=== IBF World Grand Prix (26 titles, 5 runners-up) ===
The World Badminton Grand Prix sanctioned by International Badminton Federation (IBF) from 1983 to 2006.

Women's Doubles
| Year | Tournament | Partner | Opponent | Score | Result |
|---|---|---|---|---|---|
| 1983 | All England Open | (China) Wu Dixi | (China) Wu Jianqiu (China) Xu Rong | 16–18, 15–11, 6–15 | (silver) Runner-up |
| 1984 | All England Open | (China) Wu Dixi | (South Korea) Kim Yun-ja (South Korea) Yoo Sang-hee | 15–8, 8–15, 17–14 | (gold) Winner |
| 1984 | English Masters | (China) Wu Dixi | (England) Gillian Clark (England) Nora Perry | 15–5, 15–1 | (gold) Winner |
| 1984 | Dutch Masters | (China) Wu Dixi | (England) Gillian Clark (England) Nora Perry | 15–4, 15–9 | (gold) Winner |
| 1984 | Scandinavian Cup | (China) Wu Dixi | (South Korea) Kim Yun-ja (South Korea) Yoo Sang-hee | 15–1, 15–7 | (gold) Winner |
| 1985 | Hong Kong Open | (China) Wu Dixi | (China) Han Aiping (China) Xu Rong | 4–15, 7–15 | (silver) Runner-up |
| 1985 | Malaysian Masters | (China) Wu Dixi | (China) Li Lingwei (China) Han Aiping | 15–5, 12–15, 12–15 | (silver) Runner-up |
| 1986 | Japan Open | (China) Wu Dixi | (China) Li Lingwei (China) Han Aiping | 15–4, 15–8 | (gold) Winner |
| 1986 | Malaysia Open | (China) Wu Jianqiu | (Indonesia) Ivana Lie (Indonesia) Verawaty Fadjrin | 15–4, 15–8 | (gold) Winner |
| 1987 | Japan Open | (China) Guan Weizhen | (South Korea) Chung Myung-hee (South Korea) Hwang Hye-young | 15–5, 15–6 | (gold) Winner |
| 1987 | German Open | (China) Guan Weizhen | (England) Gillian Clark (England) Gillian Gowers | 15–6, 15–10 | (gold) Winner |
| 1987 | Scandinavian Open | (China) Guan Weizhen | (China) Li Lingwei (China) Qian Ping | 15–1, 15–8 | (gold) Winner |
| 1987 | All England Open | (China) Guan Weizhen | (South Korea) Chung Myung-hee (South Korea) Hwang Hye-young | 6–15, 15–8, 11–15 | (silver) Runner-up |
| 1987 | China Open | (China) Guan Weizhen | (China) Wu Jianqiu (China) Lao Yujing | 15–5, 15–2 | (gold) Winner |
| 1987 | Thailand Open | (China) Guan Weizhen | (China) Luo Yun (China) Zhou Lei | 6–15, 15–5, 15–11 | (gold) Winner |
| 1987 | Malaysia Open | (China) Guan Weizhen | (Denmark) Dorte Kjaer (Denmark) Nettie Nielsen | 15–2, 15–1 | (gold) Winner |
| 1987 | Grand Prix Finals | (China) Guan Weizhen | (South Korea) Chung Myung-hee (South Korea) Hwang Hye-young | 15–6, 13–15, 15–4 | (gold) Winner |
| 1988 | Swedish Open | (China) Guan Weizhen | (China) Lao Yujing (China) Zheng Yuli | 15–4, 15–8 | (gold) Winner |
| 1988 | Hong Kong Open | (China) Guan Weizhen | (China) Han Aiping (China) Shang Fumei | 15–10, 15–4 | (gold) Winner |
| 1988 | China Open | (China) Guan Weizhen | (China) Sun Xiaoqing (China) Zhou Lei | 15–8, 15–4 | (gold) Winner |
| 1988 | English Masters | (China) Guan Weizhen | (England) Gillian Clark (England) Sara Sankey | 15–8, 15–6 | (gold) Winner |
| 1988 | Denmark Open | (China) Guan Weizhen | (Denmark) Dorte Kjaer (Denmark) Nettie Nielsen | 15–3, 15–12 | (gold) Winner |
| 1988 | Malaysia Open | (China) Guan Weizhen | (South Korea) Chung So-young (South Korea) Kim Yun-ja | 15–6, 15–3 | (gold) Winner |
| 1988 | Grand Prix Finals | (China) Guan Weizhen | (South Korea) Chung Myung-hee (South Korea) Hwang Hye-young | 15–4, 15–9 | (gold) Winner |
| 1989 | Malaysia Open | (China) Guan Weizhen | (South Korea) Chung So-young (South Korea) Hwang Hye-young | 15–4, 15–4 | (gold) Winner |
| 1989 | Thailand Open | (China) Guan Weizhen | (South Korea) Chung So-young (South Korea) Hwang Hye-young | 5–15, 18–17, 15–9 | (gold) Winner |
| 1989 | Hong Kong Open | (China) Guan Weizhen | (South Korea) Chung So-young (South Korea) Hwang Hye-young | 15–4, 15–9 | (gold) Winner |
| 1989 | China Open | (China) Guan Weizhen | (China) Sun Xiaoqing (China) Zhou Lei | 12–15, 15–5, 15–4 | (gold) Winner |
| 1989 | Denmark Open | (China) Guan Weizhen | (England) Gillian Clark (England) Gillian Gowers | 15–1, 15–3 | (gold) Winner |

Mixed Doubles
| Year | Tournament | Partner | Opponent | Score | Result |
|---|---|---|---|---|---|
| 1984 | Dutch Masters | (China) Jiang Guoliang | (England) Martin Dew (England) Gillian Gilks | 10–15, 17–14, 10–15 | (silver) Runner-up |
| 1987 | China Open | (China) Zhou Jincan | (China) He Shangquan (China) Xie Yufeng | 15–11, 15–1 | (gold) Winner |

=== Invitational Tournament ===
Women's Doubles
| Year | Tournament | Partner | Opponent | Score | Result |
|---|---|---|---|---|---|
| 1989 | Konica Cup | (China) Guan Weizhen | (South Korea) Chung Myung-hee (South Korea) Hwang Hye-young | 15–6, 15–8 | (gold) Winner |
