= 1985 Badminton World Cup =

Badminton championships

Tournament details
- Dates: 2–7 September 1985
- Edition: 7th
- Venue: Istora Senayan
- Location: Jakarta, Indonesia

The 1985 Badminton World Cup was the seventh edition of an international tournament Badminton World Cup. The event was held in Istora Senayan, Jakarta. Indonesia won 3 titles while China finished with the titles from 2 disciplines.

== Medalists ==
Event	Gold	Silver	Bronze
Men's singles	(Indonesia) Icuk Sugiarto	(Denmark) Morten Frost	(China) Yang Yang
Men's singles	(Indonesia) Icuk Sugiarto	(Denmark) Morten Frost	(Malaysia) Misbun Sidek
Women's singles	(China) Li Lingwei	(Indonesia) Ivana Lie	(Denmark) Kirsten Larsen
Women's singles	(China) Li Lingwei	(Indonesia) Ivana Lie	(China) Wu Jianqiu
Men's doubles	(Indonesia) Hariamanto Kartono (Indonesia) Liem Swie King	(China) Li Yongbo (China) Tian Bingyi	(Malaysia) Jalani Sidek (Malaysia) Razif Sidek
Men's doubles	(Indonesia) Hariamanto Kartono (Indonesia) Liem Swie King	(China) Li Yongbo (China) Tian Bingyi	(Indonesia) Bobby Ertanto (Indonesia) Hadibowo
Women's doubles	(China) Lin Ying (China) Wu Dixi	(South Korea) Kim Yun-ja (South Korea) Yoo Sang-hee	(China) Han Aiping (China) Li Lingwei
Women's doubles	(China) Lin Ying (China) Wu Dixi	(South Korea) Kim Yun-ja (South Korea) Yoo Sang-hee	(Indonesia) Rosiana Tendean (Indonesia) Imelda Wiguna
Mixed doubles	(Indonesia) Christian Hadinata (Indonesia) Ivana Lie	(Denmark) Steen Fladberg (England) Nora Perry	(England) Martin Dew (England) Gillian Gilks
Mixed doubles	(Indonesia) Christian Hadinata (Indonesia) Ivana Lie	(Denmark) Steen Fladberg (England) Nora Perry	(Denmark) Jesper Helledie (China) Lin Ying

== Men's singles ==
=== Finals ===
Semi-finals
(Denmark) Morten Frost	12	17	15
(China) Yang Yang	15	14	10
(Malaysia) Misbun Sidek	4	2
(Indonesia) Icuk Sugiarto	15	15

Final
(Denmark) Morten Frost	11	15	4
(Indonesia) Icuk Sugiarto	15	8	15

== Women's singles ==
=== Finals ===
- Ivana Lie defeated reigning World Champion Han Aiping (12–10, 11–7) in earlier round.

Semi-finals
(China) Li Lingwei	11	11
(China) Wu Jianqiu	6	3
(Denmark) Kirsten Larsen	9	11	2
(Indonesia) Ivana Lie	11	6	11

Final
(China) Li Lingwei	11	11
(Indonesia) Ivana Lie	3	2

== Men's doubles ==
=== Finals ===
Semi-finals
(Indonesia) Hariamanto Kartono (Indonesia) Liem Swie King	17	15
(Malaysia) Jalani Sidek (Malaysia) Razif Sidek	14	11
(Indonesia) Bobby Ertanto (Indonesia) Hadibowo	7	12
(China) Li Yongbo (China) Tian Bingyi	15	15

Final
(Indonesia) Hariamanto Kartono (Indonesia) Liem Swie King	15	11	15
(China) Li Yongbo (China) Tian Bingyi	11	15	11

== Women's doubles ==
=== Finals ===
Semi-finals
(China) Lin Ying (China) Wu Dixi	15	14	15
(Indonesia) Rosiana Tendean (Indonesia) Imelda Wiguna	5	17	10
(South Korea) Kim Yun-ja (South Korea) Yoo Sang-hee	15	11	15
(China) Han Aiping (China) Li Lingwei	11	15	3

Final
(China) Lin Ying (China) Wu Dixi	15	15
(South Korea) Kim Yun-ja (South Korea) Yoo Sang-hee	4	5

== Mixed doubles ==
=== Finals ===
Semi-finals
(Indonesia) Christian Hadinata (Indonesia) Ivana Lie	17	12	15
(Denmark) Jesper Helledie (China) Lin Ying	16	15	1
(England) Martin Dew (England) Gillian Gilks	8	7
(Denmark) Steen Fladberg (England) Nora Perry	15	15

Final
(Indonesia) Christian Hadinata (Indonesia) Ivana Lie	15	18
(Denmark) Steen Fladberg (England) Nora Perry	11	17
