= 1985 IBF World Championships =

Tournament details
- Dates: 10 June – 16 June
- Edition: 4th
- Level: International
- Venue: Olympic Saddledome
- Location: Calgary, Canada

The 1985 IBF World Championships (World Badminton Championships) were held in Calgary, Canada, from June 10 to June 16, 1985.

== Host city selection ==
Canada was selected over India and Netherlands by IBF during a meeting in May 1983.

== Venue ==
- Olympic Saddledome

== Medalists ==
=== Medal table ===
* Host nation (Canada)

Rank	Nation	Gold	Silver	Bronze	Total
1	China	3	3	4	10
2	South Korea	2	0	2	4
3	Denmark	0	1	2	3
4	Sweden	0	1	0	1
5	England	0	0	1	1
5	Indonesia	0	0	1	1
Totals (6 entries)		5	5	10	20

=== Events ===
Event	Gold	Silver	Bronze
Men's singles	(China) Han Jian	(Denmark) Morten Frost	(Denmark) Jens Peter Nierhoff
Men's singles	(China) Han Jian	(Denmark) Morten Frost	(China) Yang Yang
Women's singles	(China) Han Aiping	(China) Wu Jianqui	(China) Li Lingwei
Women's singles	(China) Han Aiping	(China) Wu Jianqui	(China) Zheng Yuli
Men's doubles	(South Korea) Park Joo-bong (South Korea) Kim Moon-soo	(China) Li Yongbo (China) Tian Bingyi	(Indonesia) Liem Swie King (Indonesia) Hariamanto Kartono
Men's doubles	(South Korea) Park Joo-bong (South Korea) Kim Moon-soo	(China) Li Yongbo (China) Tian Bingyi	(Denmark) Mark Christensen (Denmark) Michael Kjeldsen
Women's doubles	(China) Han Aiping (China) Li Lingwei	(China) Lin Ying (China) Wu Dixi	(South Korea) Kim Yun-ja (South Korea) Yoo Sang-hee
Women's doubles	(China) Han Aiping (China) Li Lingwei	(China) Lin Ying (China) Wu Dixi	(South Korea) Kang Haeng-suk (South Korea) Hwang Sun-ae
Mixed doubles	(South Korea) Park Joo-bong (South Korea) Yoo Sang-hee	(Sweden) Stefan Karlsson (Sweden) Maria Bengtsson	(England) Nigel Tier (England) Gillian Gowers
Mixed doubles	(South Korea) Park Joo-bong (South Korea) Yoo Sang-hee	(Sweden) Stefan Karlsson (Sweden) Maria Bengtsson	(China) Zhang Xinguang (China) Lao Yujing
