= Badminton at the 1982 Asian Games =

- Venue: Indraprashtha Indoor Stadium
- Dates: 25 November – 3 December

Badminton tournaments were held for the sixth time at the 9th Asian Games in 1982 in Indraprashtha Indoor Stadium, New Delhi, India from 25 November to 3 December.

There were 7 events contested including singles, doubles, and team events for both men and women, as well as mixed doubles.

== Medalists ==
| Event | Gold | Silver | Bronze |
|---|---|---|---|
| Men's singles | Han Jian; China | Liem Swie King; Indonesia | Chen Changjie; China |
| Men's singles | Han Jian; China | Liem Swie King; Indonesia | Syed Modi; India |
| Men's doubles | Indonesia; Icuk Sugiarto; Christian Hadinata | China; Luan Jin; Lin Jiangli | South Korea; Park Joo-bong; Lee Eun-ku |
| Men's doubles | Indonesia; Icuk Sugiarto; Christian Hadinata | China; Luan Jin; Lin Jiangli | India; Leroy D'Sa; Pradeep Gandhe |
| Men's team | China; Chen Changjie; Han Jian; Lin Jiangli; Luan Jin; Sun Zhian; Yao Ximing | Indonesia; Christian Hadinata; Hadiyanto Wirawan; Rudy Heryanto; Kartono; Liem Swie King; Icuk Sugiarto | India; Leroy D'Sa; Pradeep Gandhe; Partho Ganguli; Syed Modi; Uday Pawar; Vikram Singh |
| Men's team | China; Chen Changjie; Han Jian; Lin Jiangli; Luan Jin; Sun Zhian; Yao Ximing | Indonesia; Christian Hadinata; Hadiyanto Wirawan; Rudy Heryanto; Kartono; Liem Swie King; Icuk Sugiarto | South Korea; Choi Byung-hak; Kim Byung-sik; Lee Deuk-choon; Lee Eun-ku; Park Joo-bong; Sung Han-kook |
| Women's singles | Zhang Ailing; China | Li Lingwei; China | Sumiko Kitada; Japan |
| Women's singles | Zhang Ailing; China | Li Lingwei; China | Kim Yun-ja; South Korea |
| Women's doubles | South Korea; Hwang Sun-ai; Kang Haeng-suk | South Korea; Kim Yun-ja; Yoo Sang-hee | China; Wu Dixi; Lin Ying |
| Women's doubles | South Korea; Hwang Sun-ai; Kang Haeng-suk | South Korea; Kim Yun-ja; Yoo Sang-hee | Japan; Atsuko Tokuda; Yoshiko Yonekura |
| Women's team | China; Li Lingwei; Lin Ying; Wu Dixi; Wu Jianqiu; Xu Rong; Zhang Ailing | Japan; Kimiko Jinnai; Sumiko Kitada; Kazuko Takamine; Fumiko Tokairin; Atsuko Tokuda; Yoshiko Yonekura | South Korea; Hwang Sun-ai; Kang Haeng-suk; Kim Yun-ja; Song Eun-joo; Yoo Sang-hee |
| Women's team | China; Li Lingwei; Lin Ying; Wu Dixi; Wu Jianqiu; Xu Rong; Zhang Ailing | Japan; Kimiko Jinnai; Sumiko Kitada; Kazuko Takamine; Fumiko Tokairin; Atsuko Tokuda; Yoshiko Yonekura | India; Vandana Chiplunkar; Ami Ghia; Madhumita Goswami; Amita Kulkarni; Hufrish Nariman; Kanwal Thakar Singh |
| Mixed doubles | Indonesia; Christian Hadinata; Ivana Lie | Indonesia; Icuk Sugiarto; Ruth Damayanti | China; Lin Jiangli; Lin Ying |
| Mixed doubles | Indonesia; Christian Hadinata; Ivana Lie | Indonesia; Icuk Sugiarto; Ruth Damayanti | India; Leroy D'Sa; Kanwal Thakar Singh |

== Medal table ==
| Rank | Nation | Gold | Silver | Bronze | Total |
|---|---|---|---|---|---|
| 1 | China (CHN) | 4 | 2 | 3 | 9 |
| 2 | Indonesia (INA) | 2 | 3 | 0 | 5 |
| 3 | South Korea (KOR) | 1 | 1 | 4 | 6 |
| 4 | Japan (JPN) | 0 | 1 | 2 | 3 |
| 5 | India (IND) | 0 | 0 | 5 | 5 |
| Totals (5 entries) | | 7 | 7 | 14 | 28 |

== Semifinal results ==
| Discipline | Winner | Runner-up | Score |
|---|---|---|---|
| Men's singles | (China) Han Jian | (India) Syed Modi | 15–1, 15–2 |
| Men's singles | (Indonesia) Liem Swie King | (China) Chen Changjie | 15–4, 15–6 |
| Women's singles | (China) Zhang Ailing | (Japan) Sumiko Kitada | 8–11, 11–6, 11–1 |
| Women's singles | (China) Li Lingwei | (South Korea) Kim Yun-ja | 11–5, 11–8 |
| Men's doubles | (China) Lin Jiangli (China) Luan Jin | (South Korea) Lee Eun-ku (South Korea) Park Joo-bong | 15–3, 10–15, 17–16 |
| Men's doubles | (Indonesia) Christian Hadinata (Indonesia) Icuk Sugiarto | (India) Leroy D'Sa (India) Pradeep Gandhe | 11–15, 15–2, 15–5 |
| Women's doubles | (South Korea) Hwang Sun-ai (South Korea) Kang Haeng-suk | (China) Wu Dixi (China) Lin Ying | 17–16, 15–7 |
| Women's doubles | (South Korea) Yoo Sang-hee (South Korea) Kim Yun-ja | (Japan) Atsuko Tokuda (Japan) Yoshiko Yonekura | 15–12, 15–8 |
| Mixed doubles | (Indonesia) Icuk Sugiarto (Indonesia) Ruth Damyanti | (China) Lin Jiangli (China) Lin Ying | 15–5, 15–8 |
| Mixed doubles | (Indonesia) Christian Hadinata (Indonesia) Ivana Lie | (India) Leroy D'Sa (India) Kanwal Thakar Singh | 15–10, 15–3 |

== Final results ==
| Discipline | Winner | Finalist | Score |
|---|---|---|---|
| Men's singles | (China) Han Jian | (Indonesia) Liem Swie King | 18–16, 15–10 |
| Women's singles | (China) Zhang Ailing | (China) Li Lingwei | 11–6, 11–8 |
| Men's doubles | (Indonesia) Christian Hadinata (Indonesia) Icuk Sugiarto | (China) Lin Jiangli (China) Luan Jin | 15–6, 15–8 |
| Women's doubles | (South Korea) Kang Haeng-suk (South Korea) Hwang Sun-ai | (South Korea) Yoo Sang-hee (South Korea) Kim Yun-ja | 18–13, 7–15, 15–7 |
| Mixed doubles | (Indonesia) Christian Hadinata (Indonesia) Ivana Lie | (Indonesia) Icuk Sugiarto (Indonesia) Ruth Damyanti | 3–15, 15–8, 15–10 |
