= 1985 IBF World Championships – Women's doubles =

Women's doubles at the 1985 IBF World Championships
- Venue: Olympic Saddledome
- Location: Calgary, Canada
- Dates: June 10, 1985 – June 16, 1985

Medalists
gold medal	Han Aiping; Li Lingwei	China
silver medal	Lin Ying; Wu Dixi	China
bronze medal	Kim Yun-ja; Yoo Sang-hee	South Korea
bronze medal	Kang Haeng-suk; Hwang Sun-ae	South Korea

The 1985 IBF World Championships (World Badminton Championships) were held in Calgary, Canada, from June 10 to June 16, 1985. Following the results of the women's doubles.

== Main stage ==
=== Section 1 ===
First round
(China) Han Aiping (China) Li Lingwei	15	15
(United States) Dawn Race (United States) Linda French	8	10
(Sweden) Christine Magnusson (Sweden) Maria Bengtsson	w.o.
(Zambia) Josephine Chipepo (Zambia) Mary Mukangwa
(Nigeria) Grace Edward (Nigeria) Oby Edoga
(Denmark) Grete Mogensen (Denmark) Liselotte Gottsche	w.o.
(Iceland) Thordis Edwald (Scotland) Gillian Martin	8	3
(Peru) Gloria Jimenez (Peru) Silvia Jimenez	15	15
(Germany) Heidi Krickhaus (New Zealand) Toni Whittakher	1	0
(South Korea) Kim Yun-ja (South Korea) Yoo Sang-hee	15	15
(England) Helen Troke (England) Gillian Gowers	6	16
(Japan) Atsuko Tokuda (Japan) Kanako Yonekura	15	18
(Trinidad and Tobago) Debra O'Connor (Trinidad and Tobago) Beena Narwani
(India) Hufrish Nariman (India) Deepti Thanekar
(Australia) Julie McDonald (Australia) Maxine Evans	4	10
(Canada) Sandra Skillings (Canada) Claire Backhouse	15	15

Second round
(China) Han Aiping (China) Li Lingwei	15	15
(Sweden) Christine Magnusson (Sweden) Maria Bengtsson	4	4
(Denmark) Grete Mogensen (Denmark) Liselotte Gottsche	15	15	3
(Peru) Gloria Jimenez (Peru) Silvia Jimenez	2	2
(South Korea) Kim Yun-ja (South Korea) Yoo Sang-hee	15	15
(Japan) Atsuko Tokuda (Japan) Kanako Yonekura	2	8
-
(Canada) Sandra Skillings (Canada) Claire Backhouse	w.o.

Quarterfinals
(China) Han Aiping (China) Li Lingwei	15	15
(Denmark) Grete Mogensen (Denmark) Liselotte Gottsche	3	6
(South Korea) Kim Yun-ja (South Korea) Yoo Sang-hee	15	15
(Canada) Sandra Skillings (Canada) Claire Backhouse	5	2

Semi finals
(China) Han Aiping (China) Li Lingwei	15	9	18
(South Korea) Kim Yun-ja (South Korea) Yoo Sang-hee	10	15	17

=== Section 2 ===
First round
(India) Ami Ghia (India) Madhumita Bisht	15	15
(Scotland) Pamela Hamilton (Scotland)	4	9
(South Korea) Kang Haeng-suk (South Korea) Hwang Sun-ai	15	15
(Japan) Sumiko Kitada (Japan) Michiko Tomita	2	11
(Taiwan) Lee Chien-Mei (Taiwan) Sherry Liu	15	15
(Mexico) Jian Ping He (Mexico) Maria de la Paz Luna	0	8
(England) Gillian Gilks (England) Nora Perry	15	15
(Thailand) Darunee Lertvoralak (Thailand) Jutatip Banjongsilp	0	7
(Denmark) Dorte Kjær (Denmark) Nettie Nielsen	15	15
(Peru) Ximena Bellido (Peru) Carmen Bellido	2	2
(United States) Monica Pontow (United States) Barbara McKinley	2	0
(Netherlands) Eline Coene (Netherlands) Erica van Dijck	15	15
(Canada) Denyse Julien (Canada) Linda Cloutier	15	15
(Nigeria) Bridget Ibenero (Nigeria) A. Onuoha	0	0
bye
(China) Wu Dixi (China) Lin Ying

Second round
(India) Ami Ghia (India) Madhumita Bisht	7	1
(South Korea) Kang Haeng-suk (South Korea) Hwang Sun-ai	15	15
(Taiwan) Lee Chien-Mei (Taiwan) Sherry Liu	3	3
(England) Gillian Gilks (England) Nora Perry	15	15
(Denmark) Dorte Kjær (Denmark) Nettie Nielsen	18	15
(Netherlands) Eline Coene (Netherlands) Erica van Dijck	13	5
(Canada) Denyse Julien (Canada) Linda Cloutier	14	12
(China) Wu Dixi (China) Lin Ying	18	15

Quarterfinals
(South Korea) Kang Haeng-suk (South Korea) Hwang Sun-ai	15	15
(England) Gillian Gilks (England) Nora Perry	7	9
(Denmark) Dorte Kjær (Denmark) Nettie Nielsen	11	15	10
(China) Wu Dixi (China) Lin Ying	17	6	15

Semi finals
(South Korea) Kang Haeng-suk (South Korea) Hwang Sun-ai	17	9	3
(China) Wu Dixi (China) Lin Ying	16	15	15

=== Final stage ===
Quarterfinals
1	(China) Han Aiping (China) Li Lingwei	15	15
8	(Denmark) Grete Mogensen (Denmark) Liselotte Gottsche	3	6
4	(South Korea) Kim Yun-ja (South Korea) Yoo Sang-hee	15	15
5	(Canada) Sandra Skillings (Canada) Claire Backhouse	5	2
3	(South Korea) Kang Haeng-suk (South Korea) Hwang Sun-ai	15	15
6	(England) Nora Perry (England) Gillian Gilks	7	2
2	(Denmark) Dorte Kjaer (Denmark) Nettie Nielsen	11	15	10
7	(China) Lin Ying (China) Wu Dixi	15	6	15

Semifinals
(China) Han Aiping (China) Li Lingwei	15	9	18
(South Korea) Kim Yun-ja (South Korea) Yoo Sang-hee	10	15	17
(South Korea) Kang Haeng-suk (South Korea) Hwang Sun-ai	17	9	3
(China) Lin Ying (China) Wu Dixi	16	15	15

Finals
(China) Han Aiping (China) Li Lingwei	15	14	15
(China) Lin Ying (China) Wu Dixi	9	18	9
