= 1980 IBF World Championships – Women's doubles =

Women's doubles at the 1980 IBF World Championships
- Venue: Istora
- Location: Jakarta, Indonesia
- Dates: May 27, 1980 – June 1, 1980

Medalists
gold medal	Nora Perry; Jane Webster	England
silver medal	Verawaty Wiharjo; Imelda Wiguna	Indonesia
bronze medal	Karen Bridge; Barbara Sutton	England
bronze medal	Yoshiko Yonekura; Atsuko Tokuda	Japan

The 1980 IBF World Championships were held in Jakarta, Indonesia in 1980. Following the results of the women's doubles. (Note: Results of the first rounds incomplete.)

== Main stage ==
=== Section 1 ===
First round
(England) Nora Perry (England) Jane Webster
(Malaysia) Chee Geok Whee (Malaysia) Leong Chai Lean
(Indonesia) Theresia Widiastuti (Indonesia) Ruth Damayanti
(Denmark) Kirsten Larsen (Denmark) Nettie Nielsen
(India) Ami Ghia (India) Amita Kulkarni

Second round
(England) Nora Perry (England) Jane Webster
(Malaysia) Chee Geok Whee (Malaysia) Leong Chai Lean
(Indonesia) Theresia Widiastuti (Indonesia) Ruth Damayanti	15	15
(Denmark) Kirsten Larsen (Denmark) Nettie Nielsen	8	6
(India) Ami Ghia (India) Amita Kulkarni

Third round
(England) Nora Perry (England) Jane Webster	15	15
(Malaysia) Chee Geok Whee (Malaysia) Leong Chai Lean	2	8
(Indonesia) Theresia Widiastuti (Indonesia) Ruth Damayanti	15	15
(India) Ami Ghia (India) Amita Kulkarni	10	10

Quarterfinals
(England) Nora Perry (England) Jane Webster	9	15	15
(Indonesia) Theresia Widiastuti (Indonesia) Ruth Damayanti	15	5	10

=== Section 2 ===
First round
(Japan) Yoshiko Yonekura (Japan) Atsuko Tokuda
(Canada) Jane Youngberg (Canada) Claire Backhouse
(Chinese Taipei) Chen Yok Jen (Chinese Taipei) Huang Shui Chi
(Australia) Julie McDonald (Australia) Sue Daly

Second round
(Japan) Yoshiko Yonekura (Japan) Atsuko Tokuda
8	16
(Canada) Jane Youngberg (Canada) Claire Backhouse
(Chinese Taipei) Chen Yok Jen (Chinese Taipei) Huang Shui Chi
7
(Australia) Julie McDonald (Australia) Sue Daly

Third round
(Japan) Yoshiko Yonekura (Japan) Atsuko Tokuda	15	15
(Canada) Jane Youngberg (Canada) Claire Backhouse	11	9
(Chinese Taipei) Chen Yok Jen (Chinese Taipei) Huang Shui Chi	15	15
(Australia) Julie McDonald (Australia) Sue Daly	8	6

Quarterfinals
(Japan) Yoshiko Yonekura (Japan) Atsuko Tokuda	15	15
(Chinese Taipei) Chen Yok Jen (Chinese Taipei) Huang Shui Chi	5	5

=== Section 3 ===
First round
(Indonesia) Verawaty Wiharjo (Indonesia) Imelda Wiguna
(Norway) Else Thoresen (Denmark) Anne Skovgaard
(Canada) Johanne Falardeau (Canada) Linda Cloutier
(Chinese Taipei) Soo Lin (Chinese Taipei) Kong Chai Yee
'

Second round
(Indonesia) Verawaty Wiharjo (Indonesia) Imelda Wiguna
(Norway) Else Thoresen (Denmark) Anne Skovgaard
(Canada) Johanne Falardeau (Canada) Linda Cloutier
(Chinese Taipei) Soo Lin (Chinese Taipei) Kong Chai Yee

Third round
(Indonesia) Verawaty Wiharjo (Indonesia) Imelda Wiguna	15	15
(Norway) Else Thoresen (Denmark) Anne Skovgaard	7	7
(Canada) Johanne Falardeau (Canada) Linda Cloutier	15	11	15
(Chinese Taipei) Soo Lin (Chinese Taipei) Kong Chai Yee	5	15	12

Quarterfinals
(Indonesia) Verawaty Wiharjo (Indonesia) Imelda Wiguna	15	15
(Canada) Johanne Falardeau (Canada) Linda Cloutier	3	2

=== Section 4 ===
First round
(England) Karen Bridge (England) Barbara Sutton
(Australia) Audrey Swaby (Australia) Robyn Hobba
(Malaysia) Katherine Teh (Malaysia) Khaw Moo Leng
(Japan) Saori Kondo (Japan) Mikiko Takada
(Netherlands) Joke van Beusekom (Netherlands) Marjan Ridder

Second round
(England) Karen Bridge (England) Barbara Sutton
(Australia) Audrey Swaby (Australia) Robyn Hobba	15	15
(Malaysia) Katherine Teh (Malaysia) Khaw Moo Leng	12	12
(Japan) Saori Kondo (Japan) Mikiko Takada
(Netherlands) Joke van Beusekom (Netherlands) Marjan Ridder

Third round
(England) Karen Bridge (England) Barbara Sutton	15	15
(Australia) Audrey Swaby (Australia) Robyn Hobba	3	6
(Japan) Saori Kondo (Japan) Mikiko Takada	15	15
(Netherlands) Joke van Beusekom (Netherlands) Marjan Ridder	3	6

Quarterfinals
(England) Karen Bridge (England) Barbara Sutton	15	11	15
(Japan) Saori Kondo (Japan) Mikiko Takada	8	15	9

== Final stage ==
Quarterfinals
1	(England) Nora Perry (England) Jane Webster	9	15	15
8	(Indonesia) Theresia Widiastuti (Indonesia) Ruth Damayanti	15	5	10
4	(Japan) Yoshiko Yonekura (Japan) Atsuko Tokuda	15	15
5	(Chinese Taipei) Chen Yok Jen (Chinese Taipei) Huang Shui Chi	5	5
3	(Indonesia) Verawaty Wiharjo (Indonesia) Imelda Wiguna	15	15
6	(Canada) Johanne Falardeau (Canada) Linda Cloutier	3	2
2	(England) Karen Bridge (England) Barbara Sutton	15	11	15
7	(Japan) Saori Kondo (Japan) Mikiko Takada	8	15	9

Semifinals
(England) Nora Perry (England) Jane Webster	15	15	15
(Japan) Yoshiko Yonekura (Japan) Atsuko Tokuda	12	17	6
(Indonesia) Verawaty Wiharjo (Indonesia) Imelda Wiguna	12	15	15
(England) Karen Bridge (England) Barbara Sutton	15	10	4

Finals
(England) Nora Perry (England) Jane Webster	15	15
(Indonesia) Verawaty Wiharjo (Indonesia) Imelda Wiguna	12	3
