= Jane Webster =

English badminton player

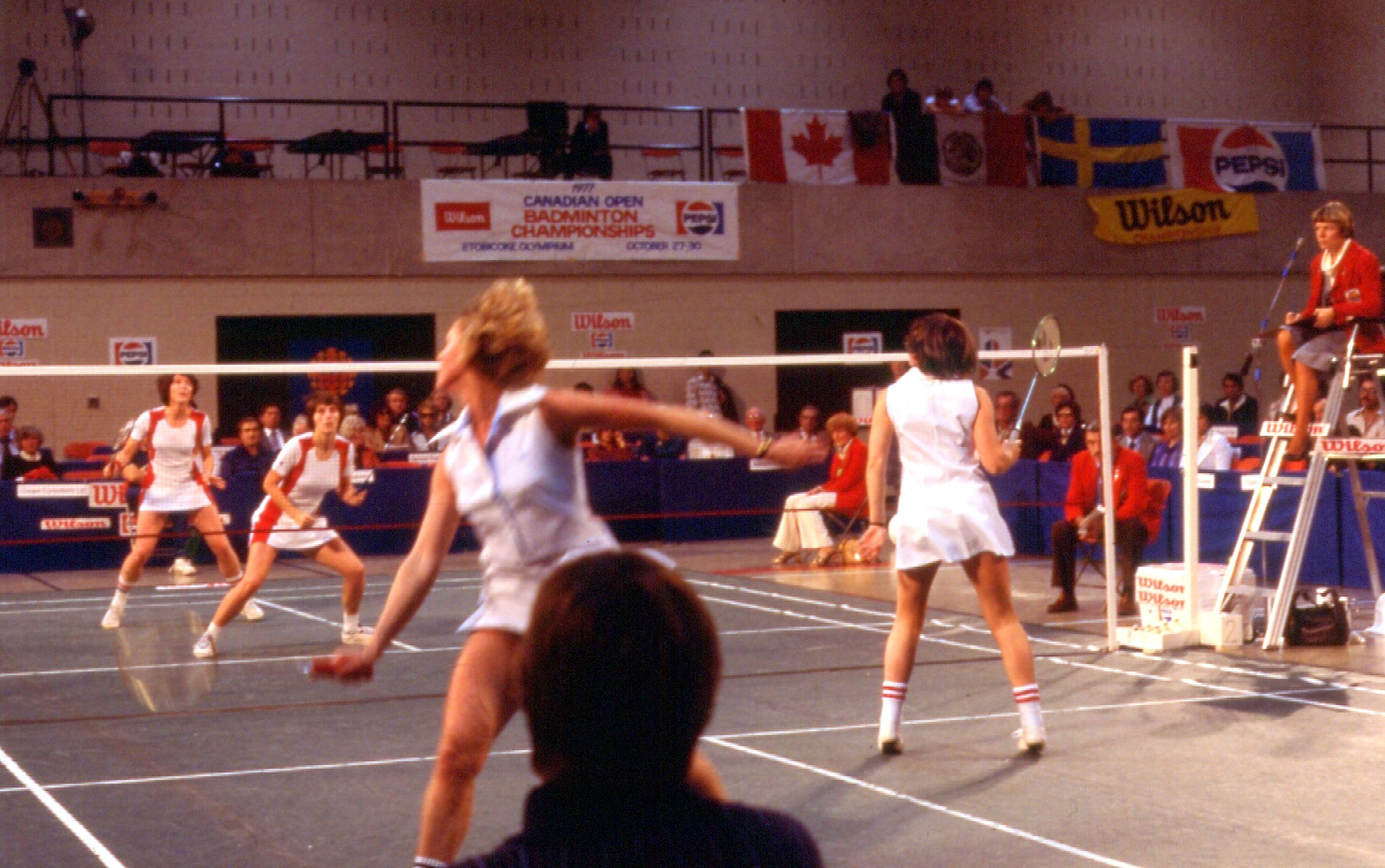

Personal information
- Born: Jane Anne Webster; 2 August 1956 (age 70) Peterborough, Cambridgeshire, England

Sport
- Country: England
- Sport: Badminton
- Handedness: Left
Medal record
Women's badminton
Representing Great Britain
World Games
Silver medal – second place	1981 Santa Clara	Women's doubles
Representing England
World Championships
Gold medal – first place	1980 Jakarta	Women's doubles
Silver medal – second place	1983 Copenhagen	Women's doubles
World Cup
Bronze medal – third place	1980 Kyoto	Women's doubles
Uber Cup
Silver medal – second place	1984 Kuala Lumpur	Women's team
Commonwealth Games
Gold medal – first place	1978 Edmonton	Mixed team
European Championships
Gold medal – first place	1980 Groningen	Women's doubles
Silver medal – second place	1978 Preston	Women's singles
Silver medal – second place	1978 Preston	Women's doubles
Silver medal – second place	1982 Böblingen	Women's doubles
Bronze medal – third place	1980 Groningen	Women's singles
Bronze medal – third place	1982 Böblingen	Women's singles
European Mixed Team Championships
Gold medal – first place	1978 Preston	Mixed team
Gold medal – first place	1982 Böblingen	Mixed team
Silver medal – second place	1980 Groningen	Mixed team

Jane Webster (born 2 August 1956), now known as Jane Sutton, is an English badminton player noted for her strong and consistent shot-making. Though competitive at a world-class level in singles, her greatest success came in doubles competition.

== Career ==
She won the 1980 IBF World Championships in women's doubles with Nora Perry. The same year they also won the 1980 European Badminton Championships, and in 1981 they captured the All England Doubles title. Webster and Perry were silver medalists in defense of their title at the then triennial World Championships in 1983. She won the English National ladies doubles title in 1978–79 with Gillian Gilks and the 1981–82 and 1982–83 titles with Nora Perry. Webster also won the English National Ladies Singles title in the 1981–82 season, her best in singles which included victories in the Dutch Open and the Indian Masters Invitation. Webster shared the Japan Open Ladies Doubles Title in 1982 with Nora Perry. Her last major title before retiring was the 1984 Indonesian Open ladies doubles crown, again, with Nora Perry. She represented England 85 times in international team matches.

== Achievements ==
=== World Championships ===
Women's doubles
Year	Venue	Partner	Opponent	Score	Result
1980	Istora Senayan, Jakarta, Indonesia	(England) Nora Perry	(Indonesia) Verawaty Wiharjo (Indonesia) Imelda Wiguna	15–12, 15–3	Gold
1983	Brøndby Arena, Copenhagen, Denmark	(England) Nora Perry	(China) Lin Ying (China) Wu Dixi	4–15, 12–15	Silver

=== World Games ===
Women's doubles
Year	Venue	Partner	Opponent	Score	Result
1981	San Jose Civic Auditorium, California, United States	(United Kingdom) Nora Perry	(China) Zhang Ailing (China) Liu Xia	15–11, 4–15, 8–15	Silver

=== World Cup ===
Women's doubles
Year	Venue	Partner	Opponent	Score	Result
1980	Kyoto, Japan	(England) Nora Perry	(Japan) Atsuko Tokuda (Japan) Yoshiko Yonekura	4–15, 17–16, 5–15	Bronze

=== European Championships ===
Women's singles
Year	Venue	Opponent	Score	Result
1978	Preston, England	(Denmark) Lene Køppen	4–11, 11–9, 0–11	Silver
1980	Groningen, Netherlands	(Sweden) Anette Börjesson	5–11, 11–5, 2–11	Bronze
1982	Böblingen, West Germany	(England) Karen Bridge	0–11, 2–11	Bronze

Women's doubles
Year	Venue	Partner	Opponent	Score	Result
1978	Preston, England	(England) Barbara Sutton	(England) Nora Perry (England) Anne Statt	7–15, 7–15	Silver
1980	Groningen, Netherlands	(England) Nora Perry	(Denmark) Kirsten Larsen (Denmark) Pia Nielsen	15–8, 15–13	Gold
1982	Böblingen, West Germany	(England) Nora Perry	(England) Gillian Gilks (England) Gillian Clark	3–15, 11–15	Silver

=== IBF World Grand Prix ===
The World Badminton Grand Prix was sanctioned by International Badminton Federation (IBF) from 1983-2006.

Women's singles
Year	Tournament	Opponent	Score	Result
1983	Swedish Open	(England) Helen Troke	2–11, 5–11	(silver) Runner-up
1985	Dutch Open	(Denmark) Kirsten Larsen	6–11, 8–11	(silver) Runner-up

Women's doubles
Year	Tournament	Partner	Opponent	Score	Result
1983	Chinese Taipei Open	(England) Nora Perry	(England) Gillian Clark (England) Gillian Gilks	10–15, 14–15	(silver) Runner-up
1983	Japan Open	(England) Nora Perry	(England) Gillian Clark (England) Gillian Gilks	6–15, 8–15	(silver) Runner-up
1983	Swedish Open	(England) Nora Perry	(Japan) Sumiko Kitada (Japan) Shigemi Kawamura	15–10, 15–8	(gold) Winner
1983	Malaysia Open	(England) Nora Perry	(South Korea) Kim Yun-ja (South Korea) Yoo Sang-hee	15–11, 4–15, 7–15	(silver) Runner-up
1984	Indonesia Open	(England) Nora Perry	(China) Wu Jianqiu (China) Guan Weizhen	9–15, 18–16, 18–15	(gold) Winner
1984	Scottish Open	(England) Karen Chapman	(England) Karen Beckman (Scotland) Pamela Hamilton	14–18, 18–13, 15–6	(gold) Winner

Mixed doubles
Year	Tournament	Partner	Opponent	Score	Result
1983	Japan Open	(England) Martin Dew	(Sweden) Thomas Kihlström (England) Nora Perry	5–15, 2–15	(silver) Runner-up

=== International Tournament ===
Women's singles
Year	Venue	Opponent	Score	Result
1978	Swedish Open	(Denmark) Lene Køppen	5–11, 2–11	(silver) Runner-up
1980	Chinese Taipei Open	(Denmark) Lene Køppen	9–12, 5–11	(silver) Runner-up
1980	Bell’s Open	(England) Gillian Gilks	11–6, 11–8	(gold) Winner
1981	Chinese Taipei Open	(South Korea) Hwang Sun-ai		(silver) Runner-up
1981	Copenhagen Cup	(England) Gillian Gilks	11–7, 9–12, 11–9	(gold) Winner
1981	Dutch Open	(Denmark) Lene Køppen	3–11, 3–11	(silver) Runner-up
1982	India Open	(Japan) Yoshiko Yonekura	11–3, 11–5	(gold) Winner
1982	Dutch Open	(England) Gillian Clark	12–11, 8–11, 11–4	(gold) Winner

Women's doubles
Year	Tournament	Partner	Opponent	Score	Result
1976	German Open	(England) Barbara Sutton	(England) Gillian Gilks (England) Susan Whetnall	11–15, 9–15	(silver) Runner-up
1977	Denmark Open	(England) Barbara Sutton	(Netherlands) Marjan Ridder (Netherlands) Joke van Beusekom	15–9, 15–9	(gold) Winner
1979	Dutch Open	(England) Barbara Sutton	(Netherlands) Marjan Ridder (England) Gillian Gilks	12–15, 7–15	(silver) Runner-up
1979	English Masters	(England) Nora Perry	(Japan) Atsuko Tokuda (Japan) Yoshiko Yonekura	15–2, 8–15, 15–10	(gold) Winner
1980	Welsh International	(England) Nora Perry	(England) Gillian Gilks (England) Paula Kilvington	17–14, 9–15, 11–15	(silver) Runner-up
1980	German Open	(England) Karen Chapman	(England) Gillian Clark (England) Sally Podger	15–9, 15–5	(gold) Winner
1980	Chinese Taipei Open	(England) Nora Perry	(Denmark) Lene Køppen (Denmark) Kirsten Larsen	15–5, 15–7	(gold) Winner
1980	Bell’s Open	(England) Nora Perry	(England) Gillian Gilks (England) Paula Kilvington	8–15, 6–15	(silver) Runner-up
1980	English Masters	(England) Nora Perry	(Japan) Atsuko Tokuda (Japan) Yoshiko Yonekura	14–18, 15–6, 12–15	(silver) Runner-up
1981	Copenhagen Cup	(England) Nora Perry	(England) Gillian Gilks (England) Paula Kilvington	12–15, 8–15	(silver) Runner-up
1981	Chinese Taipei Open	(England) Nora Perry	(Chinese Taipei) Chern Yuk-jen (Chinese Taipei) Hwang Hsiu-chi	15–5, 15–6	(gold) Winner
1981	Japan Open	(England) Nora Perry	(Japan) Atsuko Tokuda (Japan) Yoshiko Yonekura	6–15, 15–7, 8–15	(silver) Runner-up
1981	Denmark Open	(England) Nora Perry	(Japan) Atsuko Tokuda (Japan) Yoshiko Yonekura	15–12, 18–15	(gold) Winner
1981	All England Open	(England) Nora Perry	(England) Gillian Gilks (England) Paula Kilvington	15–8, 15–4	(gold) Winner
1981	Dutch Open	(England) Nora Perry	(England) Gillian Gilks (England) Paula Kilvington	7–15, 8–15	(silver) Runner-up
1981	India Open	(England) Nora Perry	(China) Lin Ying (China) Wu Dixi	17–14, 13–15, 17–15	(gold) Winner
1981	Scandinavian Cup	(England) Nora Perry	(China) Zhang Ailing (China) Liu Xia	15–12, 15–9	(gold) Winner
1982	Chinese Taipei Open	(England) Nora Perry	(Indonesia) Verawaty Fadjrin (Indonesia) Ruth Damyanti	15–8, 18–17	(gold) Winner
1982	Bell’s Open	(England) Nora Perry	(England) Gillian Gilks (England) Catharine Troke	15–4, 15–5	(gold) Winner
1982	India Open	(England) Karen Chapman	(England) Gillian Clark (England) Gillian Gilks	1–15, 8–15	(silver) Runner-up
1982	Japan Open	(England) Nora Perry	(Indonesia) Verawaty Fadjrin (Indonesia) Ruth Damyanti	3–15, 15–7, 15–12	(gold) Winner
1982	Hong Kong Open	(England) Nora Perry	(China) Wu Jianqiu (China) Xu Rong	15–10, 15–13	(gold) Winner
1982	Scandinavian Cup	(England) Nora Perry	(Japan) Atsuko Tokuda (Japan) Yoshiko Yonekura	11–15, 15–9, 15–4	(gold) Winner

Mixed doubles
Year	Tournament	Partner	Opponent	Score	Result
1981	Scandinavian Cup	(Denmark) Steen Skovgaard	(England) Mike Tredgett (England) Nora Perry	12–15, 8–15	(silver) Runner-up
1982	India Open	(Sweden) Thomas Kihlström	(Scotland) Billy Gilliland (England) Karen Chapman	14–18, 11–15	(silver) Runner-up
1982	Japan Open	(England) Martin Dew	(England) Mike Tredgett (England) Nora Perry	10–15, 2–15	(silver) Runner-up
