= Japan Open (badminton) =

Annual badminton tournament in Japan

- Official website
- Founded: 1982; 44 years ago
- Editions: 43 (2026)
- Location: Tokyo, Japan (2026)
- Venue: Tokyo Metropolitan Gymnasium
- Prize money: USD950,000 (2026)

Men's
- Draw: 32S / 32D
- Current champions: Christo Popov (singles); Fajar Alfian; Muhammad Shohibul Fikri (doubles)
- Most singles titles: 6 Lee Chong Wei
- Most doubles titles: 4 Candra Wijaya; Park Joo-bong; Ricky Subagja

Women's
- Draw: 32S / 32D
- Current champions: P. V. Sindhu (singles); Kim Hye-jeong; Kong Hee-yong (doubles)
- Most singles titles: 4 Li Lingwei; Akane Yamaguchi
- Most doubles titles: 4 Chung So-young; Ge Fei; Gu Jun

Mixed doubles
- Draw: 32
- Current champions: Feng Yanzhe; Huang Dongping
- Most titles (male): 5 Park Joo-bong
- Most titles (female): 6 Chung Myung-hee

Super 750
- China Masters; Denmark Open; French Open; India Open; Japan Open; Singapore Open

Last completed
- 2026 Japan Open

The Japan Open is an annual badminton tournament held in Japan. It became part of the BWF Super Series in 2007. Since 2018, the BWF has categorized the Japan Open as one of the five BWF World Tour Super 750 events in the BWF event structure.

== Tournament history ==
The tournament was established in 1982 and was officially called the "First Yonex Cup Japan Open". It was the first international badminton tournament in Japan to offer prize money, with a total prize money of 10 million yen. The participants were the world's top badminton players from 19 countries. The first tournament was held from January 14 to 17, 1982 at the Shukugawa Gakuin Gymnasium, and Kobe Central Gymnasium in Kobe City, Hyōgo Prefecture.

By 1991, the event had grown to a size that attracted the largest number of competitors ever, with 262 competitors from 25 countries. To celebrate its 10th anniversary, the event's official name was changed to Yonex Japan Open. In 1996, the event's scale reached a new level, with 340 competitors from 26 countries competing before the Atlanta Olympics. In 1998, the event's official name was changed to Yonex Open Japan.

Since 2007, the tournament has become part of the BWF Super Series, with the total prize money increased to US$200,000. In 2013, the tournament produced its first local champion in 32 years. At the age of 16, Akane Yamaguchi reached the women's singles final and defeated Shizuka Uchida to become the youngest BWF Super Series champion.

Since 2017, the event has been sponsored by automobile manufacturer Daihatsu and officially named the Daihatsu Yonex Japan Open, with the total prize money increased to US $325,000.

== Host cities ==
- 1982: Kobe
- 1983, 2024: Yokohama
- 1984–1985, 1987: Gunma
- 1986, 2022: Osaka
- 1988–2019, 2023, 2025–2026: Tokyo
Locations of Japan Open host cities

== Winners ==
Year	Men's singles	Women's singles	Men's doubles	Women's doubles	Mixed doubles	Ref
1982	(Sweden) Thomas Kihlström	(China) Li Lingwei	(Indonesia) Rudy Heryanto (Indonesia) Hariamanto Kartono	(England) Nora Perry (England) Jane Webster	(England) Mike Tredgett (England) Nora Perry	
1983	(China) Han Jian	(China) Han Aiping	(Sweden) Stefan Karlsson (Sweden) Thomas Kihlström	(England) Gillian Clark (England) Gillian Gilks	(Sweden) Thomas Kihlström (England) Nora Perry	
1984	(Denmark) Morten Frost	(China) Zheng Yuli	(Sweden) Stefan Karlsson (Sweden) Thomas Kihlström	(England) Karen Beckman (England) Gillian Gilks	(England) Martin Dew (England) Gillian Gilks	
1985	(China) Zhao Jianhua	(China) Wu Jianqiu	(South Korea) Kim Moon-soo (South Korea) Park Joo-bong	(South Korea) Kim Yun-ja (South Korea) Yoo Sang-hee	(Scotland) Billy Gilliland (England) Gillian Gowers	
1986	(China) Yang Yang	(China) Li Lingwei	(Malaysia) Jalani Sidek (Malaysia) Razif Sidek	(China) Lin Ying (China) Wu Dixi	(Scotland) Billy Gilliland (England) Nora Perry	
1987	(China) Xiong Guobao	(China) Li Lingwei	(Indonesia) Eddy Hartono (Indonesia) Liem Swie King	(China) Guan Weizhen (China) Lin Ying	(South Korea) Lee Deuk-choon (South Korea) Chung Myung-hee	
1988	(England) Nick Yates	(China) Han Aiping	(China) Li Yongbo (China) Tian Bingyi	(South Korea) Chung Myung-hee (South Korea) Chung So-young	(South Korea) Park Joo-bong (South Korea) Chung Myung-hee	
1989	(China) Yang Yang	(China) Li Lingwei	(South Korea) Lee Sang-bok (South Korea) Park Joo-bong	(England) Gillian Clark (England) Julie Munday	(South Korea) Park Joo-bong (South Korea) Chung Myung-hee	
1990	(Denmark) Morten Frost	(China) Huang Hua	(South Korea) Kim Moon-soo (South Korea) Park Joo-bong	(China) Lai Caiqin (China) Yao Fen	(South Korea) Park Joo-bong (South Korea) Chung Myung-hee	
1991	(Indonesia) Ardy Wiranata	(China) Huang Hua	(South Korea) Kim Moon-soo (South Korea) Park Joo-bong	(England) Gillian Clark (England) Gillian Gowers	(South Korea) Park Joo-bong (South Korea) Chung Myung-hee	
1992	(Indonesia) Ardy Wiranata	(Indonesia) Susi Susanti	(China) Chen Hongyong (China) Chen Kang	(South Korea) Chung So-young (South Korea) Hwang Hye-young	(Denmark) Thomas Lund (Denmark) Pernille Dupont	
1993	(Indonesia) Hariyanto Arbi	(China) Ye Zhaoying	(China) Chen Hongyong (China) Chen Kang	(South Korea) Chung So-young (South Korea) Gil Young-ah	(Denmark) Thomas Lund (Sweden) Catrine Bengtsson	
1994	(Indonesia) Ardy Wiranata	(Indonesia) Susi Susanti	(Indonesia) Denny Kantono (Indonesia) Ricky Subagja	(South Korea) Chung So-young (South Korea) Gil Young-ah	(Denmark) Jon Holst-Christensen (Sweden) Catrine Bengtsson	
1995	(Indonesia) Hariyanto Arbi	(Indonesia) Susi Susanti	(Indonesia) Rexy Mainaky (Indonesia) Ricky Subagja	(China) Ge Fei (China) Gu Jun	(Denmark) Thomas Lund (Denmark) Marlene Thomsen	
1996	(Indonesia) Joko Suprianto	(China) Ye Zhaoying	(Indonesia) Rexy Mainaky (Indonesia) Ricky Subagja	(South Korea) Gil Young-ah (South Korea) Jang Hye-ock	(South Korea) Park Joo-bong (South Korea) Ra Kyung-min	
1997	(Denmark) Peter Rasmussen	(Indonesia) Mia Audina	(Indonesia) Rexy Mainaky (Indonesia) Ricky Subagja	(China) Ge Fei (China) Gu Jun	(China) Liu Yong (China) Ge Fei	
1998	(Denmark) Peter Gade	(China) Gong Zhichao	(Malaysia) Cheah Soon Kit (Malaysia) Yap Kim Hock	(China) Ge Fei (China) Gu Jun	(South Korea) Kim Dong-moon (South Korea) Ra Kyung-min	
1999	(Denmark) Peter Gade	(China) Ye Zhaoying	(South Korea) Ha Tae-kwon (South Korea) Kim Dong-moon	(China) Ge Fei (China) Gu Jun	(China) Liu Yong (China) Ge Fei	
2000	(China) Ji Xinpeng	(China) Gong Zhichao	(Indonesia) Tony Gunawan (Indonesia) Candra Wijaya	(China) Huang Nanyan (China) Yang Wei	(China) Liu Yong (China) Ge Fei	
2001	(Malaysia) Roslin Hashim	(China) Zhou Mi	(Indonesia) Sigit Budiarto (Indonesia) Candra Wijaya	(China) Gao Ling (China) Huang Sui	(Indonesia) Bambang Suprianto (Indonesia) Minarti Timur	
2002	(South Korea) Lee Hyun-il	(China) Zhou Mi	(Malaysia) Chan Chong Ming (Malaysia) Chew Choon Eng	(South Korea) Lee Kyung-won (South Korea) Ra Kyung-min	(South Korea) Kim Dong-moon (South Korea) Ra Kyung-min	
2003	(China) Xia Xuanze	(Denmark) Camilla Martin	(England) Eng Hian (England) Flandy Limpele	(China) Gao Ling (China) Huang Sui	(China) Zhang Jun (China) Gao Ling	
2004	(Singapore) Ronald Susilo	(Netherlands) Mia Audina	(South Korea) Ha Tae-kwon (South Korea) Kim Dong-moon	(South Korea) Lee Kyung-won (South Korea) Ra Kyung-min	(Indonesia) Nova Widianto (Indonesia) Vita Marissa	
2005	(China) Lin Dan	(China) Zhang Ning	(Denmark) Jens Eriksen (Denmark) Martin Lundgaard Hansen	(China) Yang Wei (China) Zhang Jiewen	(Thailand) Sudket Prapakamol (Thailand) Saralee Thungthongkam	
2006	(China) Lin Dan	(China) Zhang Ning	(United States) Tony Gunawan (Indonesia) Candra Wijaya	(China) Gao Ling (China) Huang Sui	(Indonesia) Flandy Limpele (Indonesia) Vita Marissa	
2007	(Malaysia) Lee Chong Wei	(Denmark) Tine Rasmussen	(United States) Tony Gunawan (Indonesia) Candra Wijaya	(China) Yang Wei (China) Zhang Jiewen	(China) Zheng Bo (China) Gao Ling	
2008	(Indonesia) Sony Dwi Kuncoro	(China) Wang Yihan	(Denmark) Lars Paaske (Denmark) Jonas Rasmussen	(China) Cheng Shu (China) Zhao Yunlei	(Indonesia) Muhammad Rijal (Indonesia) Vita Marissa	
2009	(China) Bao Chunlai	(China) Wang Yihan	(Indonesia) Markis Kido (Indonesia) Hendra Setiawan	(China) Ma Jin (China) Wang Xiaoli	(Thailand) Songphon Anugritayawon (Thailand) Kunchala Voravichitchaikul	
2010	(Malaysia) Lee Chong Wei	(China) Jiang Yanjiao	(China) Cai Yun (China) Fu Haifeng	(China) Wang Xiaoli (China) Yu Yang	(China) Zhang Nan (China) Zhao Yunlei	
2011	(China) Chen Long	(China) Wang Yihan	(China) Cai Yun (China) Fu Haifeng	(China) Bao Yixin (China) Zhong Qianxin	(Chinese Taipei) Chen Hung-ling (Chinese Taipei) Cheng Wen-hsing	
2012	(Malaysia) Lee Chong Wei	(Chinese Taipei) Tai Tzu-ying	(South Korea) Kim Gi-jung (South Korea) Kim Sa-rang	(Hong Kong) Poon Lok Yan (Hong Kong) Tse Ying Suet	(Malaysia) Chan Peng Soon (Malaysia) Goh Liu Ying	
2013	(Malaysia) Lee Chong Wei	(Japan) Akane Yamaguchi	(Indonesia) Mohammad Ahsan (Indonesia) Hendra Setiawan	(China) Ma Jin (China) Tang Jinhua	(China) Zhang Nan (China) Zhao Yunlei	
2014	(Malaysia) Lee Chong Wei	(China) Li Xuerui	(South Korea) Lee Yong-dae (South Korea) Yoo Yeon-seong	(Japan) Misaki Matsutomo (Japan) Ayaka Takahashi	(China) Zhang Nan (China) Zhao Yunlei	
2015	(China) Lin Dan	(Japan) Nozomi Okuhara	(South Korea) Lee Yong-dae (South Korea) Yoo Yeon-seong	(China) Zhao Yunlei (China) Zhong Qianxin	(Denmark) Joachim Fischer Nielsen (Denmark) Christinna Pedersen	
2016	(Malaysia) Lee Chong Wei	(China) He Bingjiao	(China) Li Junhui (China) Liu Yuchen	(Denmark) Christinna Pedersen (Denmark) Kamilla Rytter Juhl	(China) Zheng Siwei (China) Chen Qingchen	
2017	(Denmark) Viktor Axelsen	(Spain) Carolina Marín	(Indonesia) Marcus Fernaldi Gideon (Indonesia) Kevin Sanjaya Sukamuljo	(Japan) Misaki Matsutomo (Japan) Ayaka Takahashi	(China) Wang Yilyu (China) Huang Dongping	
2018	(Japan) Kento Momota	(Spain) Carolina Marín	(Indonesia) Marcus Fernaldi Gideon (Indonesia) Kevin Sanjaya Sukamuljo	(Japan) Yuki Fukushima (Japan) Sayaka Hirota	(China) Zheng Siwei (China) Huang Yaqiong	
2019	(Japan) Kento Momota	(Japan) Akane Yamaguchi	(Indonesia) Marcus Fernaldi Gideon (Indonesia) Kevin Sanjaya Sukamuljo	(South Korea) Kim So-yeong (South Korea) Kong Hee-yong	(China) Wang Yilyu (China) Huang Dongping	
2020	Cancelled (Note: This tournament, originally to be played from 22 to 27 September, was later cancelled due to the COVID-19 pandemic in Japan.)					
2021	Cancelled (Note: This tournament, originally to be played from 28 September to 3 October, was later cancelled due to the COVID-19 pandemic in Japan.)					
2022	(Japan) Kenta Nishimoto	(Japan) Akane Yamaguchi	(China) Liang Weikeng (China) Wang Chang	(South Korea) Jeong Na-eun (South Korea) Kim Hye-jeong	(Thailand) Dechapol Puavaranukroh (Thailand) Sapsiree Taerattanachai	
2023	(Denmark) Viktor Axelsen	(South Korea) An Se-young	(Chinese Taipei) Lee Yang (Chinese Taipei) Wang Chi-lin	(South Korea) Kim So-yeong (South Korea) Kong Hee-yong	(Japan) Yuta Watanabe (Japan) Arisa Higashino	
2024	(France) Alex Lanier	(Japan) Akane Yamaguchi	(Malaysia) Goh Sze Fei (Malaysia) Nur Izzuddin	(China) Liu Shengshu (China) Tan Ning	(China) Jiang Zhenbang (China) Wei Yaxin	
2025	(China) Shi Yuqi	(South Korea) An Se-young	(South Korea) Kim Won-ho (South Korea) Seo Seung-jae	(China) Liu Shengshu (China) Tan Ning	(China) Jiang Zhenbang (China) Wei Yaxin	
2026	(France) Christo Popov	(India) P. V. Sindhu	(Indonesia) Fajar Alfian (Indonesia) Muhammad Shohibul Fikri	(South Korea) Kim Hye-jeong (South Korea) Kong Hee-yong	(China) Feng Yanzhe (China) Huang Dongping	

== Performances by nation ==
As of the 2026 edition

Rank	Nation	MS	WS	MD	WD	XD	Total
1	China	13	25	7	21	15	81
2	South Korea	1	2	10	12	8	33
3	Indonesia	7	4	15		4	30
4	Denmark	7	2	2	1	4	16
5	Japan*	3	5		3	1	12
5	Malaysia	7		4		1	12
7	England	1		1	5	3.5	10.5
8	Sweden	1		2		1.5	4.5
9	Chinese Taipei		1	1		1	3
9	Thailand					3	3
11	France	2					2
11	Spain		2				2
13	Hong Kong				1		1
13	India		1				1
13	Netherlands		1				1
13	Scotland					1	1
13	Singapore	1					1
13	United States			1			1
Total		43	43	43	43	43	215

* Host nation

== See also ==
- Kumamoto Masters Japan
