= Kang Haeng-suk =

South Korean badminton player

Personal information
- Born: 20 May 1961 (age 65)

Sport
- Country: South Korea
- Sport: Badminton
Medal record
Women's badminton
Representing South Korea
World Championships
Bronze medal – third place	1985 Calgary	Women's doubles
Asian Games
Gold medal – first place	1982 New Delhi	Women's doubles
Bronze medal – third place	1982 New Delhi	Women's team
Bronze medal – third place	1986 Seoul	Women's team

- Kang Haeng-suk
- Hangul: 강행숙
- Hanja: 姜幸淑
- RR: Gang Haengsuk
- MR: Kang Haengsuk

Kang Haeng-suk (Korean: 강행숙; born 20 May 1961) is a retired female badminton player from South Korea.

== Career ==
She won the bronze medal at the 1985 IBF World Championships in women's doubles with Hwang Sun-ai.

== Achievements ==
=== World Championships ===
Women's doubles
Year	Venue	Partner	Opponent	Score	Result
1985	Olympic Saddledome, Calgary, Canada	(South Korea) Hwang Sun-ai	(China) Lin Ying (China) Wu Dixi	17–16, 9–15, 3–15	Bronze

=== Asian Games ===
Women's doubles
Year	Venue	Partner	Opponent	Score	Result
1982	Indraprashtha Stadium, New Delhi, India	(South Korea) Hwang Sun-ai	(South Korea) Kim Yun-ja (South Korea) Yoo Sang-hee	18–13, 7–15, 15–7	Gold

=== IBF World Grand Prix ===
The World Badminton Grand Prix sanctioned by International Badminton Federation (IBF) from 1983 to 2006.

Women's doubles
Year	Tournament	Partner	Opponent	Score	Result
1985	India Open	(South Korea) Hwang Sun-ai	(England) Gillian Clark (England) Gillian Gowers	15–7, 15–12	(gold) Winner

Mixed doubles
Year	Tournament	Partner	Opponent	Score	Result
1985	India Open	(South Korea) Kim Moon-soo	(England) Steve Baddeley (England) Gillian Gowers	15–11, 9–15, 12–15	(silver) Runner-up
