= India Open =

Annual badminton tournament in India

- Official website
- Founded: 1973; 53 years ago
- Editions: 24 (2026)
- Location: New Delhi; India
- Venue: Indira Gandhi Arena (2026)
- Prize money: US$950,000 (2026)

Men's
- Draw: 32S / 32D
- Current champions: Lin Chun-yi (singles); Liang Weikeng; Wang Chang (doubles)
- Most singles titles: 3 Lee Chong Wei; Viktor Axelsen
- Most doubles titles: 3 Marcus Fernaldi Gideon; Kevin Sanjaya Sukamuljo

Women's
- Draw: 32S / 32D
- Current champions: An Se-young (singles); Liu Shengshu; Tan Ning (doubles)
- Most singles titles: 3 Ratchanok Intanon; An Se-young
- Most doubles titles: 2 Miyuki Maeda; Satoko Suetsuna; Misaki Matsutomo; Ayaka Takahashi; Greysia Polii; Apriyani Rahayu

Mixed doubles
- Draw: 32
- Current champions: Dechapol Puavaranukroh; Supissara Paewsampran
- Most titles (male): 3, Tontowi Ahmad
- Most titles (female): 3, Liliyana Natsir

Super 750
- China Masters; Denmark Open; French Open; India Open; Japan Open; Singapore Open

Last completed
- 2026 India Open

The India Open is an annual badminton event which has been held in India since 1973 and from 2023 it's a BWF World Tour Super 750 international badminton tournament. In 2008-10 first three editions were designated as Grand Prix Gold events. In 2011, it was upgraded to a BWF Superseries tournament. From 2011 until 2019, it was held annually at the Siri Fort Sports Complex, New Delhi.The BWF categorised India Open as one of the seven BWF World Tour Super 500 events as per the event structure since 2018. The India Open has been upgraded to a BWF World Tour Super 750 event as of 2023.

== Locations ==
Below is the cities that have hosted the tournament.

- Hyderabad: 2008–2009
- Chennai: 2010
- New Delhi: 2011–present
Locations of India Open host cities

== Past Winners ==
Year	Men's singles	Women's singles	Men's doubles	Women's doubles	Mixed doubles	Ref
1973	(Denmark) Svend Pri	(Sweden) Eva Twedberg	(England) Elliot Stuart (England) Derek Talbot	(Sweden) Eva Twedberg (Netherlands) Joke van Beusekom	(England) Elliot Stuart (Sweden) Eva Twedberg	
1974– 1978	No competition					
1979	(Indonesia) Dhany Sartika	(Indonesia) Tjan So Gwan	(Indonesia) Rudy Heryanto (Indonesia) Hariamanto Kartono	(Indonesia) Ivanna Lie (Indonesia) Tjan So Gwan	(Indonesia) Hariamanto Kartono (Indonesia) Tjan So Gwan	
1980	No competition					
1981	(India) Prakash Padukone	(China) Zheng Yuli	(Sweden) Stefan Karlsson (Sweden) Thomas Kihlström	(England) Nora Perry (England) Jane Webster	(England) Ray Stevens (England) Nora Perry	
1982	(Indonesia) Lius Pongoh	(England) Jane Webster	(Sweden) Stefan Karlsson (Sweden) Thomas Kihlström	(England) Gillian Clark (England) Gillian Gilks	(Scotland) Billy Gilliland (England) Karen Chapman	
1983	(Denmark) Morten Frost	(South Korea) Yoo Sang-hee	(Denmark) Jesper Helledie (Denmark) Jens Peter Nierhoff	(South Korea) Kim Yun-ja (South Korea) Yoo Sang-hee	No competition	
1984	No competition					
1985	(England) Steve Baddeley	(England) Helen Troke	(South Korea) Kim Moon-soo (South Korea) Park Joo-bong	(South Korea) Hwang Sun-ai (South Korea) Kang Haeng-suk	(England) Steve Baddeley (England) Gillian Gowers	
1986– 1996	No competition					
1997	(Indonesia) Heryanto Arbi	(Indonesia) Cindana Hartono Kusuma	(Indonesia) Ade Lukas (Indonesia) Ade Sutrisna	(Indonesia) Etty Tantri (Indonesia) Cynthia Tuwankotta	(Indonesia) Imam Tohari (Indonesia) Emma Ermawati	
1998– 2007	No competition					
2008	(Thailand) Boonsak Ponsana	(Hong Kong) Zhou Mi	(China) Guo Zhendong (China) Xie Zhongbo	(Chinese Taipei) Cheng Wen-hsing (Chinese Taipei) Chien Yu-chin	(China) He Hanbin (China) Yu Yang	
2009	(Indonesia) Taufik Hidayat	(France) Pi Hongyan	(Malaysia) Choong Tan Fook (Malaysia) Lee Wan Wah	(China) Ma Jin (China) Wang Xiaoli	(Indonesia) Flandy Limpele (Indonesia) Vita Marissa	
2010	(Indonesia) Alamsyah Yunus	(India) Saina Nehwal	(Malaysia) Mohd Zakry Abdul Latif (Malaysia) Mohd Fairuzizuan Mohd Tazari	(Singapore) Shinta Mulia Sari (Singapore) Yao Lei	(India) Valiyaveetil Diju (India) Jwala Gutta	
2011	(Malaysia) Lee Chong Wei	(Thailand) Porntip Buranaprasertsuk	(Japan) Hirokatsu Hashimoto (Japan) Noriyasu Hirata	(Japan) Miyuki Maeda (Japan) Satoko Suetsuna	(Indonesia) Tontowi Ahmad (Indonesia) Liliyana Natsir	
2012	(South Korea) Son Wan-ho	(China) Li Xuerui	(Thailand) Bodin Isara (Thailand) Maneepong Jongjit	(South Korea) Jung Kyung-eun (South Korea) Kim Ha-na	(Indonesia) Tontowi Ahmad (Indonesia) Liliyana Natsir	
2013	(Malaysia) Lee Chong Wei	(Thailand) Ratchanok Intanon	(China) Liu Xiaolong (China) Qiu Zihan	(Japan) Miyuki Maeda (Japan) Satoko Suetsuna	(Indonesia) Tontowi Ahmad (Indonesia) Liliyana Natsir	
2014	(Malaysia) Lee Chong Wei	(China) Wang Shixian	(Denmark) Mathias Boe (Denmark) Carsten Mogensen	(China) Tang Yuanting (China) Yu Yang	(Denmark) Joachim Fischer Nielsen (Denmark) Christinna Pedersen	
2015	(India) Srikanth Kidambi	(India) Saina Nehwal	(China) Chai Biao (China) Hong Wei	(Japan) Misaki Matsutomo (Japan) Ayaka Takahashi	(China) Liu Cheng (China) Bao Yixin	
2016	(Japan) Kento Momota	(Thailand) Ratchanok Intanon	(Indonesia) Marcus Fernaldi Gideon (Indonesia) Kevin Sanjaya Sukamuljo	(Japan) Misaki Matsutomo (Japan) Ayaka Takahashi	(China) Lu Kai (China) Huang Yaqiong	
2017	(Denmark) Viktor Axelsen	(India) P. V. Sindhu	(Indonesia) Marcus Fernaldi Gideon (Indonesia) Kevin Sanjaya Sukamuljo	(Japan) Shiho Tanaka (Japan) Koharu Yonemoto	(China) Lu Kai (China) Huang Yaqiong	
2018	(China) Shi Yuqi	(United States) Beiwen Zhang	(Indonesia) Marcus Fernaldi Gideon (Indonesia) Kevin Sanjaya Sukamuljo	(Indonesia) Greysia Polii (Indonesia) Apriyani Rahayu	(Denmark) Mathias Christiansen (Denmark) Christinna Pedersen	
2019	(Denmark) Viktor Axelsen	(Thailand) Ratchanok Intanon	(Chinese Taipei) Lee Yang (Chinese Taipei) Wang Chi-lin	(Indonesia) Greysia Polii (Indonesia) Apriyani Rahayu	(China) Wang Yilyu (China) Huang Dongping	
2020	Cancelled (Note: This tournament, originally to be played from 8 to 13 December, was later cancelled due to the COVID-19 pandemic in India.)					
2021	Cancelled (Note: This tournament, originally to be played from 11 to 16 May, was later cancelled due to the COVID-19 pandemic in India.)					
2022	(India) Lakshya Sen	(Thailand) Busanan Ongbamrungphan	(India) Satwiksairaj Rankireddy (India) Chirag Shetty	(Thailand) Benyapa Aimsaard (Thailand) Nuntakarn Aimsaard	(Singapore) Terry Hee (Singapore) Tan Wei Han	
2023	(Thailand) Kunlavut Vitidsarn	(South Korea) An Se-young	(China) Liang Weikeng (China) Wang Chang	(Japan) Nami Matsuyama (Japan) Chiharu Shida	(Japan) Yuta Watanabe (Japan) Arisa Higashino	
2024	(China) Shi Yuqi	(Chinese Taipei) Tai Tzu-ying	(South Korea) Kang Min-hyuk (South Korea) Seo Seung-jae	(Japan) Mayu Matsumoto (Japan) Wakana Nagahara	(Thailand) Dechapol Puavaranukroh (Thailand) Sapsiree Taerattanachai	
2025	(Denmark) Viktor Axelsen	(South Korea) An Se-young	(Malaysia) Goh Sze Fei (Malaysia) Nur Izzuddin	(Japan) Arisa Igarashi (Japan) Ayako Sakuramoto	(China) Jiang Zhenbang (China) Wei Yaxin	
2026	(Chinese Taipei) Lin Chun-yi	(South Korea) An Se-young	(China) Liang Weikeng (China) Wang Chang	(China) Liu Shengshu (China) Tan Ning	(Thailand) Dechapol Puavaranukroh (Thailand) Supissara Paewsampran	

== Performance by nations ==
As of the 2026 edition

Pos	Nation	MS	WS	MD	WD	XD	Total
1	Indonesia	5	2	5	4	6	22
2	China	2	3	5	3	6	19
3	Japan	1		1	8	1	11
3	Thailand	2	5	1	1	2	11
5	South Korea	1	4	2	3		10
6	Denmark	5		2		2	9
6	England	1	2	1	2	3	9
8	India	3	3	1		1	8
9	Malaysia	3		3			6
10	Chinese Taipei	1	1	1	1		4
10	Sweden		1	2	0.5	0.5	4
12	Singapore				1	1	2
13	France		1				1
13	Hong Kong		1				1
13	United States		1				1
16	Netherlands				0.5		0.5
16	Scotland					0.5	0.5
Total		24	24	24	24	23	119

== See also ==
- Syed Modi International Badminton Championships
- Hyderabad Open (Defunct)
- Odisha Masters
- Guwahati Masters
- India International Challenge
