= Hwang Sun-ai =

South Korean badminton player

Personal information
- Born: 18 April 1962 (age 64) Daejeon, South Korea
- Years active: 1978–1987

Sport
- Country: South Korea
- Sport: Badminton

Women's singles & Women's doubles
- Highest ranking: 1 (WS) (June 1981)
Medal record
Women's badminton
Representing South Korea
World Games
Silver medal – second place	1981 Santa Clara	Women's singles
Bronze medal – third place	1981 Santa Clara	Women's doubles
World Championships
Bronze medal – third place	1985 Calgary	Women's doubles
Asian Games
Gold medal – first place	1982 New Delhi	Women's doubles
Bronze medal – third place	1982 New Delhi	Women's team

Hwang Sun-ai (Korean: 황선애; Hanja: 黄善愛; born 18 April 1962 in Daejeon) is a retired female badminton player from South Korea.

== Career ==
Hwang started playing table tennis for a while at a young age until her table tennis team from her school was dissolved and replaced by a badminton team when she was in her last year of elementary school. She switched over and became a badminton player. She continued to play in middle school, in the Daejeon area. There was a women's team at the national tobacco company headquarters, in her neighborhood, and the military team, where some of Korea's eventual top coaches played as young men, also trained in the same location. So she as well as other young players learned a lot from the older badminton specialists training in the same place at that time. When she graduated to high school she left to Masan over 200 km away from home, in South Gyeongsang Province, to play for the Sungji Girls’ High School badminton team there, which was already very famous for its badminton program. From there she was selected by the Korea Badminton Association for the Asian Games in 1978. In January 1981 she won two events, the Chinese Taipei Open in Taiwan and the Japan Open, therefore receiving an invitation for the All England Open that year.

Hwang gained international attention in 1981 when she swept four championships including the All England Open. In the final of the women's singles at the 1981 All England Open Badminton Championships, she defeated two-time All England defending champion Lene Køppen of Denmark, allowing only three points. In June 1981, Hwang was ranked number 1 in the world by the International Badminton Federation. After her All England victory, also a first for South Korea, she was asked to visit the Blue House, the Korean president's residence and was even voted "Athlete of the Year" in Korea.

Hwang began the 1981–1982 season in a slump due to an ankle injury that she suffered at the end of the previous season, and in singles won only a bronze medal at the Japan Open. However, she won her first international doubles gold medal at the 1982 Asian Games, with partner Kang Haeng-suk.

In 1983 Hwang continued to struggle with injury which seriously hampered the pace of her training. She was left off the South Korean national team and only played in South Korea's collegiate competitions.

In March 1985 Hwang was called up to the national team again but mainly as a doubles player. In June 1985 she won a bronze medal at the World Championships in women's doubles with Kang Haeng-suk.

Hwang injured herself at the Scandinavian Open in March 1986 and damaged her ankle and waist again at the Uber Cup in Jakarta, Indonesia in April 1986. No longer selected for the national squad, she retired from badminton in 1987.

== Achievements ==
=== World Championships ===
Women's doubles
Year	Venue	Partner	Opponent	Score	Result
1985	Olympic Saddledome, Calgary, Canada	(South Korea) Kang Haeng-suk	(China) Lin Ying (China) Wu Dixi	17–16, 9–15, 3–15	Bronze

=== World Games ===
Women's singles
Year	Venue	Opponent	Score	Result
1981	San Jose Civic Auditorium, California, United States	(China) Zhang Ailing	11–7, 9–11, 9–12	Silver

Women's doubles
Year	Venue	Partner	Opponent	Score	Result
1981	San Jose Civic Auditorium, California, United States	(South Korea) Kim Yun-ja	(United Kingdom) Jane Webster (United Kingdom) Nora Perry	15–8, 14–17, 10–15	Bronze

=== Asian Games ===
Women's doubles
Year	Venue	Partner	Opponent	Score	Result
1982	Indraprashtha Stadium, New Delhi, India	(South Korea) Kang Haeng-suk	(South Korea) Kim Yun-ja (South Korea) Yoo Sang-hee	18–13, 7–15, 15–7	Gold

=== IBF World Grand Prix ===
The World Badminton Grand Prix sanctioned by International Badminton Federation (IBF) from 1983 to 2006.

Women's doubles
Year	Tournament	Partner	Opponent	Score	Result
1985	India Open	(South Korea) Kang Haeng-suk	(England) Gillian Clark (England) Gillian Gowers	15–7, 15–12	(gold) Winner

=== International tournaments ===
Women's singles
Year	Tournament	Opponent	Score	Result
1981	Chinese Taipei Open	(England) Jane Webster		(gold) Winner
1981	Japan Open	(Japan) Atsuko Tokuda	11–3, 11–5	(gold) Winner
1981	Swedish Open	(Indonesia) Ivana Lie	11–2, 11–8	(gold) Winner
1981	All England Open	(Denmark) Lene Køppen	11–1, 11–2	(gold) Winner

== Personal life ==
Hwang Sun-ai has been working as a teacher in her hometown of Daejeon for more than twenty years.
