= Kim Yun-ja =

South Korean badminton player (born 1963)

Personal information
- Born: 15 May 1963 (age 63)

Sport
- Country: South Korea
- Sport: Badminton
Medal record
Women's badminton
Representing South Korea
World Championships
Bronze medal – third place	1985 Calgary	Women's doubles
Bronze medal – third place	1987 Beijing	Women's doubles
World Games
Bronze medal – third place	1981 Santa Clara	Women's doubles
World Cup
Silver medal – second place	1985 Kuala Lumpur	Women's doubles
Silver medal – second place	1988 Bangkok	Women's doubles
Bronze medal – third place	1983 Kuala Lumpur	Women's doubles
Uber Cup
Silver medal – second place	1988 Kuala Lumpur	Women's team
Asian Games
Silver medal – second place	1982 New Delhi	Women's doubles
Silver medal – second place	1986 Seoul	Women's doubles
Bronze medal – third place	1982 New Delhi	Women's singles
Bronze medal – third place	1986 Seoul	Women's singles
Bronze medal – third place	1982 New Delhi	Women's team
Bronze medal – third place	1986 Seoul	Women's team
Asian Championships
Gold medal – first place	1985 Kuala Lumpur	Women's doubles
Gold medal – first place	1983 Calcutta	Mixed doubles
Silver medal – second place	1983 Calcutta	Women's singles

- Kim Yun-ja
- Hangul: 김연자
- Hanja: 金練子
- RR: Gim Yeonja
- MR: Kim Yŏnja

Kim Yun-ja (Korean: 김연자, born 15 May 1963) is a retired female badminton player from South Korea. She is the last player to win All England Open titles in both singles and doubles.

In 1989, Kim married Sung Han-kook, a fellow world-class player who later went on to become the national team head coach. Sung and Kim's daughter Sung Ji-hyun is also a badminton player.

== Career ==
Kim was one of a Korean finest women's badminton player in early 1980s where she won 2 bronzes in women's singles and 2 silvers in women's doubles at 1982 Asian Games and 1986 Asian Games. Kim also snatched two golds and one silver medals in 1983 and 1985 Asian Championships which two of it in women's doubles and another one in mixed doubles. In the World Championships, Kim won two bronze medals in women's doubles, one at the 1985 IBF World Championships with Yoo Sang-hee, and another at the 1987 IBF World Championships with Chung So-young.

== Post-Retirement ==
She has long been retired from the sports since 1988 and stay with the sports as a fulltime instructor specifically for badminton in Hansei University. In 1998, She became a professor and working in several universities such as Hankuk University of Foreign Studies and Korea National Sports University

== Achievements ==
=== Olympic Games ===
Women's doubles
Year	Venue	Partner	Opponent	Score	Result
1988 (Exhibition)	Seoul National University Gymnasium, Seoul, South Korea	(South Korea) Chung So-young	(China) Guan Weizhen (China) Lin Ying	15–11, 14–17, 15–5	Gold

=== World Championships ===
Women's doubles
Year	Venue	Partner	Opponent	Score	Result
1985	Olympic Saddledome, Calgary, Canada	(South Korea) Yoo Sang-hee	(China) Han Aiping (China) Li Lingwei	10–15, 15–9, 17–18	Bronze
1987	Capital Indoor Stadium, Beijing, China	(South Korea) Chung So-young	(China) Guan Weizhen (China) Lin Ying	15–12, 12–15, 4–15	Bronze

=== World Games ===
Women's doubles
Year	Venue	Partner	Opponent	Score	Result
1981	San Jose Civic Auditorium, California, United States	(South Korea) Hwang Sun-ai	(United Kingdom) Jane Webster (United Kingdom) Nora Perry	15–8, 14–17, 10–15	Bronze

=== World Cup ===
Women's doubles
Year	Venue	Partner	Opponent	Score	Result
1983	Stadium Negara, Kuala Lumpur, Malaysia	(South Korea) Yoo Sang-hee	(China) Han Aiping (China) Li Lingwei	14–17, 3–15	Bronze
1985	Istora Senayan, Jakarta, Indonesia	(South Korea) Yoo Sang-hee	(China) Lin Ying (China) Wu Dixi	4–15, 5–15	Silver
1988	National Stadium, Bangkok, Thailand	(South Korea) Chung So-young	(China) Guan Weizhen (China) Lin Ying	3–15, 7–15	Silver

=== Asian Games ===
Women' singles
Year	Venue	Opponent	Score	Result
1982	Indraprashtha Stadium, New Delhi, India	(China) Li Lingwei	5–11, 8–11	Bronze
1986	Olympic Gymnastics Arena, Seoul, South Korea	(China) Han Aiping	7–11, 9–12	Bronze

Women's doubles
Year	Venue	Partner	Opponent	Score	Result
1982	Indraprashtha Stadium, New Delhi, India	(South Korea) Yoo Sang-hee	(South Korea) Hwang Sun-ai (South Korea) Kang Haeng-suk	13–18, 15–7, 7–15	Silver
1986	Olympic Gymnastics Arena, Seoul, South Korea	(South Korea) Yoo Sang-hee	(China) Lin Ying (China) Guan Weizhen	9–15, 15–8, 10–15	Silver

=== Asian Championships ===
Women's singles
Year	Venue	Opponent	Score	Result
1983	Netaji Indoor Stadium, Calcutta, India	(South Korea) Yoo Sang-hee	6–11, 2–11	Silver

Women's doubles
Year	Venue	Partner	Opponent	Score	Result
1983	Netaji Indoor Stadium, Calcutta, India	(South Korea) Yoo Sang-hee	(China) Fan Ming (China) Guan Weizhen	15–10, 6–15, 14–17	Bronze
1985	Stadium Negara, Kuala Lumpur, Malaysia	(South Korea) Yoo Sang-hee	(South Korea) Hwang Hye-young (South Korea) Chung So-young	15–5, 15–4	Gold

Mixed doubles
Year	Venue	Partner	Opponent	Score	Result
1983	Calcutta, India	(South Korea) Park Joo-bong	(Indonesia) Hafid Yusuf (Indonesia) Ruth Damayanti	15–3, 15–2	Gold

=== IBF World Grand Prix (19 titles, 8 runners-up) ===
The World Badminton Grand Prix sanctioned by International Badminton Federation (IBF) from 1983 to 2006.

Women's singles
Year	Tournament	Opponent	Score	Result
1984	Swedish Open	(Japan) Fumiko Tookairin	11–6, 5–11, 10–12	(silver) Runner-Up
1985	Scandinavian Cup	(Denmark) Kirsten Larsen	11–4, 11–2	(gold) Winner
1986	German Open	(England) Helen Troke	11–1, 8–11, 12–10	(gold) Winner
1986	All England Open	(China) Qian Ping	11–6, 12–11	(gold) Winner
1987	French Open	(South Korea) Lee Young-suk	11–4, 5–11, 11–0	(gold) Winner

Women's doubles
Year	Venue	Partner	Opponent	Score	Result
1983	Denmark Open	(South Korea) Yoo Sang-hee			(gold) Winner
1983	Malaysia Open	(South Korea) Yoo Sang-hee	(England) Jane Webster (England) Nora Perry	11–15, 15–4, 15–7	(gold) Winner
1983	India Open	(South Korea) Yoo Sang-hee	(Indonesia) Ruth Damyanti (Indonesia) Maria Francisca	15–7, 15–12	(gold) Winner
1984	Denmark Open	(South Korea) Yoo Sang-hee	(Japan) Atsuko Tokuda (Japan) Yoshiko Yonekura	3–15, 15–5, 15–13	(gold) Winner
1984	Swedish Open	(South Korea) Yoo Sang-hee	(Japan) Atsuko Tokuda (Japan) Yoshiko Yonekura	15–11, 8–15, 15–9	(gold) Winner
1984	All England Open	(South Korea) Yoo Sang-hee	(China) Lin Ying (China) Wu Dixi	8–15, 15–8, 14–17	(silver) Runner-up
1984	Scandinavian Cup	(South Korea) Yoo Sang-hee	(China) Lin Ying (China) Wu Dixi	1–15, 7–15	(silver) Runner-up
1985	Japan Open	(South Korea) Yoo Sang-hee	(China) Guan Weizhen (China) Wu Jianqiu	15–5, 15–3	(gold) Winner
1985	Denmark Open	(South Korea) Yoo Sang-hee	(England) Gillian Gilks (England) Nora Perry	15–7, 15–7	(gold) Winner
1985	Scandinavian Open	(South Korea) Yoo Sang-hee	(Sweden) Maria Bengtsson (Sweden) Christine Magnusson	8–15, 15–5, 15–1	(gold) Winner
1986	German Open	(South Korea) Yoo Sang-hee	(South Korea) Hwang Hye-young (South Korea) Chung So-young	15–10, 15–5	(gold) Winner
1986	Scandinavian Open	(South Korea) Yoo Sang-hee	(South Korea) Chung Myung-hee (South Korea) Chung So-young	15–7, 17–14	(gold) Winner
1986	All England Open	(South Korea) Yoo Sang-hee	(South Korea) Hwang Hye-young (South Korea) Chung So-young	5–15, 15–6, 8–15	(silver) Runner-up
1986	China Open	(South Korea) Yoo Sang-hee	(Indonesia) Ivana Lie (Indonesia) Verawaty Fadjrin	8–15, 10–15	(silver) Runner-up
1987	Hong Kong Open	(South Korea) Chung So-young	(Indonesia) Ivana Lie (Indonesia) Rosiana Tendean	18–14, 11–15, 15–2	(gold) Winner
1988	Poona Open	(South Korea) Yoo Sang-hee	(Denmark) Dorte Kjaer (Denmark) Nettie Nielsen	15–12, 15–2	(gold) Winner
1988	All England Open	(South Korea) Chung So-young	(South Korea) Chung Myung-hee (South Korea) Hwang Hye-young	15–8, 9–15 retired	(gold) Winner
1988	French Open	(South Korea) Chung So-young	(South Korea) Chung Myung-hee (South Korea) Hwang Hye-young	9–15, 13–18	(silver) Runner-up
1988	Canadian Open	(South Korea) Chung So-young	(Netherlands) Eline Coene (Netherlands) Erica van Dijck	4–15, 3–15	(silver) Runner-up
1988	U.S. Open	(South Korea) Chung So-young	(South Korea) Cho Young-suk (South Korea) Lee Myung-hee	17–14, 15–4	(gold) Winner
1988	Malaysia Open	(South Korea) Chung So-young	(China) Guan Weizhen (China) Lin Ying	6–15, 3–15	(silver) Runner-up

Mixed doubles
Year	Venue	Partner	Opponent	Score	Result
1987	French Open	(South Korea) Park Joo-bong	(Denmark) Mark Christiansen (Netherlands) Erica Van Den Heuvel	15–10, 15–7	(gold) Winner
