= Wu Jianqiu =

Chinese badminton player

Wu Jianqiu 吴健秋
Personal information
- Born: 1962 (age 63–64) Nantong, Jiangsu, China

Sport
- Country: China
- Sport: Badminton
Medal record
Women's badminton
Representing China
World Championships
Bronze medal – third place	1983 Copenhagen	Women's doubles
Silver medal – second place	1985 Calgary	Women's singles
World Cup
Silver medal – second place	1983 Kuala Lumpur	Women's doubles
Silver medal – second place	1984 Jakarta	Women's doubles
Bronze medal – third place	1985 Jakarta	Women's singles
Uber Cup
Gold medal – first place	1984 Kuala Lumpur	Women's team
Gold medal – first place	1986 Jakarta	Women's team
Asian Games
Gold medal – first place	1982 New Delhi	Women's team
Gold medal – first place	1986 Seoul	Women's team

Wu Jianqiu (Chinese: 吴健秋, born 1962) is a retired female badminton player from China.

== Career ==
Wu was one of China's leading combination women's singles and doubles players in the first several years after her country joined the International Badminton Federation (now Badminton World Federation). She won the Danish Open women's singles in 1982 (the first of the two Danish Opens that were played that year). In 1983 she won the prestigious All-England Open women's doubles title with Xu Rong and was runner-up in the singles to fellow countrywoman Zhang Ailing. She also earned a bronze medal in women's doubles with Xu Rong at the 1983 IBF World Championships. In 1985 she won the Japan Open and a silver medal at the IBF World Championships (defeating the great Li Lingwei in the semifinals) in women's singles. Wu was a member of Chinese Uber Cup (women's international) teams which won world team championships in both 1984 and 1986.

== Achievements ==
=== World Championships ===
Women's singles
Year	Venue	Opponent	Score	Result
1985	Olympic Saddledome, Calgary, Canada	(China) Han Aiping	11–6, 11–12, 2–11	Silver

Women's doubles
Year	Venue	Partner	Opponent	Score	Result
1983	Brøndbyhallen, Copenhagen, Denmark	(China) Xu Rong	(England) Jane Webster (England) Nora Perry	11–15, 8–15	Bronze

=== World Cup ===
Women's singles
Year	Venue	Opponent	Score	Result
1983	Stadium Negara, Kuala Lumpur, Malaysia	(China) Li Lingwei	6–11, 3–11	Bronze

Women's doubles
Year	Venue	Partner	Opponent	Score	Result
1983	Stadium Negara, Kuala Lumpur, Malaysia	(China) Xu Rong	(China) Han Aiping (China) Li Lingwei	15–6, 8–15, 5–15	Silver
1984	Istora Senayan, Jakarta, Indonesia	(China) Xu Rong	(China) Wu Dixi (China) Lin Ying	6–15, 15–7, 7–15	Silver

=== Open tournaments ===
Women's singles
Year	Tournament	Opponent	Score	Result
1982	Swedish Open	(China) Wu Dixi	12–11, 2–11, 1–11	(silver) Runner-up
1982	Denmark Open	(China) Xu Rong	11–5, 11–0	(gold) Winner

Women's doubles
Year	Tournament	Partner	Opponent	Score	Result
1982	German Open	(China) Xu Rong	(China) Wu Dixi (China) Lin Ying	8–15, 15–13, 9–15	(silver) Runner-up
1982	Swedish Open	(China) Xu Rong	(China) Wu Dixi (China) Lin Ying	15–7, 15–12	(gold) Winner
1982	Denmark Open	(China) Xu Rong	(China) Wu Dixi (China) Lin Ying	12–15, 3–15	(silver) Runner-up

=== IBF World Grand Prix ===
The World Badminton Grand Prix sanctioned by International Badminton Federation (IBF) from 1983 to 2006.

Women's singles
Year	Tournament	Opponent	Score	Result
1983	All England Open	(China) Zhang Ailing	5–11, 12–10, 9–12	(silver) Runner-up
1984	Malaysia Open	(China) Li Lingwei	11–6, 8–11, 8–11	(silver) Runner-up
1984	Indonesia Open	(China) Li Lingwei	7–11, 4–11	(silver) Runner-up
1985	Japan Open	(Denmark) Kirsten Larsen	11–7, 8–11, 11–7	(gold) Winner
1985	Thailand Open	(China) Qian Ping	11–7, 11–7	(gold) Winner
1986	Malaysia Open	(China) Shi Wen	11–7, 10–12, 9–11	(silver) Runner-up

Women's doubles
Year	Tournament	Partner	Opponent	Score	Result
1983	All England Open	(China) Xu Rong	(China) Wu Dixi (China) Lin Ying	15–9, 15–11	(gold) Winner
1983	Indonesia Open	(China) Xu Rong	(Indonesia) Maria Fransisca (Indonesia) Ruth Damayanti	15–11, 11–15, 3–15	(silver) Runner-up
1984	Malaysia Open	(China) Guan Weizhen	(Sweden) Christine Magnusson (England) Gillian Clark	15–10, 15–13	(gold) Winner
1984	Indonesia Open	(China) Guan Weizhen	(England) Jane Webster (England) Nora Perry	15–9, 16–18, 15–18	(silver) Runner-up
1985	Swedish Open	(China) Guan Weizhen	(China) Han Aiping (China) Li Lingwei	12–15, 6–15	(silver) Runner-up
1985	German Open	(China) Guan Weizhen	(England) Karen Beckman (England) Gillian Gilks	15–9, 6–15, 15–9	(gold) Winner
1985	Japan Open	(China) Guan Weizhen	(South Korea) Yoo Sang-hee (South Korea) Kim Yun-ja	5–15, 3–15	(silver) Runner-up
1985	Thailand Open	(China) Guan Weizhen	(Indonesia) Imelda Wiguna (Indonesia) Rosiana Tendean	15–1, 15–0	(gold) Winner
1986	Malaysia Open	(China) Lin Ying	(Indonesia) Ivana Lie (Indonesia) Verawaty Fadjrin	15–4, 15–8	(gold) Winner
1987	China Open	(China) Lao Yujing	(China) Guan Weizhen (China) Lin Ying	5–15, 2–15	(silver) Runner-up
