= Yoo Sang-hee =

South Korean badminton player (born 1964)

- Hangul: 유상희
- Hanja: 柳尙希
- RR: Yu Sanghui
- MR: Yu Sanghŭi

Yoo Sang-hee
Sport
- Country: South Korea
- Sport: Badminton
Medal record
Women's badminton
Representing South Korea
World Championships
Gold medal – first place	1985 Calgary	Mixed doubles
Bronze medal – third place	1985 Calgary	Women's doubles
World Cup
Silver medal – second place	1985 Jakarta	Women's doubles
Bronze medal – third place	1983 Kuala Lumpur	Women's doubles
Asian Games
Silver medal – second place	1982 New Delhi	Women's doubles
Silver medal – second place	1986 Seoul	Women's doubles
Bronze medal – third place	1982 New Delhi	Women's team
Bronze medal – third place	1986 Seoul	Women's team
Asian Championships
Gold medal – first place	1983 Calcutta	Women's singles
Gold medal – first place	1985 Kuala Lumpur	Women's doubles
Bronze medal – third place	1983 Calcutta	Women's doubles

Yoo Sang-hee is a former female badminton player from South Korea.

Yoo competed at the 1985 IBF World Championships, where she won the gold medal in mixed doubles with Park Joo-bong, and the bronze medal in women's doubles with Kim Yun-ja. In 1988, Yoo retired from international badminton and married fellow 1985 World Champion Kim Moon-soo.

== Achievements ==
=== World Championships ===
Women's doubles
Year	Venue	Partner	Opponent	Score	Result
1985	Olympic Saddledome, Calgary, Canada	(South Korea) Kim Yun-ja	(China) Han Aiping (China) Li Lingwei	10–15, 15–9, 17–18	Bronze

Mixed doubles
Year	Venue	Partner	Opponent	Score	Result
1985	Olympic Saddledome, Calgary, Canada	(South Korea) Park Joo-bong	(Sweden) Stefan Karlsson (Sweden) Maria Bengtsson	15–10, 10–15, 15–12	Gold

=== World Cup ===
Women's doubles
Year	Venue	Partner	Opponent	Score	Result
1983	Stadium Negara, Kuala Lumpur, Malaysia	(South Korea) Kim Yun-ja	(China) Han Aiping (China) Li Lingwei	14–17, 3–15	Bronze
1985	Istora Senayan, Jakarta, Indonesia	(South Korea) Kim Yun-ja	(China) Lin Ying (China) Wu Dixi	4–15, 5–15	Silver

=== Asian Games ===
Women's doubles
Year	Venue	Partner	Opponent	Score	Result
1982	Indraprashtha Stadium, New Delhi, India	(South Korea) Kim Yun-ja	(South Korea) Hwang Sun-ai (South Korea) Kang Haeng-suk	13–18, 15–7, 7–15	Silver
1986	Olympic Gymnastics Arena, Seoul, South Korea	(South Korea) Kim Yun-ja	(China) Lin Ying (China) Guan Weizhen	9–15, 15–8, 10–15	Silver

=== Asian Championships ===
Women's singles
Year	Venue	Opponent	Score	Result
1983	Netaji Indoor Stadium, Calcutta, India	(South Korea) Kim Yun-ja	11–6, 11–2	Gold

Women's doubles
Year	Venue	Partner	Opponent	Score	Result
1983	Netaji Indoor Stadium, Calcutta, India	(South Korea) Kim Yun-ja	(China) Fan Ming (China) Guan Weizhen	15–10, 6–15, 14–17	Bronze
1985	Stadium Negara, Kuala Lumpur, Malaysia	(South Korea) Kim Yun-ja	(South Korea) Hwang Hye-young (South Korea) Chung So-young	15–5, 15–4	Gold

=== IBF World Grand Prix (12 titles, 4 runners-up) ===
The World Badminton Grand Prix was sanctioned by the International Badminton Federation (IBF) from 1983 to 2006.

Women's singles
Year	Tournament	Opponent	Score	Result
1983	India Open	(Denmark) Kirsten Larsen	11–6, 11–1	(gold) Winner

Women's doubles
Year	Venue	Partner	Opponent	Score	Result
1983	Denmark Open	(South Korea) Kim Yun-ja			(gold) Winner
1983	Malaysia Open	(South Korea) Kim Yun-ja	(England) Jane Webster (England) Nora Perry	11–15, 15–4, 15–7	(gold) Winner
1983	India Open	(South Korea) Kim Yun-ja	(Indonesia) Ruth Damyanti (Indonesia) Maria Francisca	15–7, 15–12	(gold) Winner
1984	Denmark Open	(South Korea) Kim Yun-ja	(Japan) Atsuko Tokuda (Japan) Yoshiko Yonekura	3–15, 15–5, 15–13	(gold) Winner
1984	Swedish Open	(South Korea) Kim Yun-ja	(Japan) Atsuko Tokuda (Japan) Yoshiko Yonekura	15–11, 8–15, 15–9	(gold) Winner
1984	All England Open	(South Korea) Kim Yun-ja	(China) Lin Ying (China) Wu Dixi	8–15, 15–8, 14–17	(silver) Runner-Up
1984	Scandinavian Cup	(South Korea) Kim Yun-ja	(China) Lin Ying (China) Wu Dixi	1–15, 7–15	(silver) Runner-Up
1985	Japan Open	(South Korea) Kim Yun-ja	(China) Guan Weizhen (China) Wu Jianqiu	15–5, 15–3	(gold) Winner
1985	Denmark Open	(South Korea) Kim Yun-ja	(England) Gillian Gilks (England) Nora Perry	15–7, 15–7	(gold) Winner
1985	Scandinavian Open	(South Korea) Kim Yun-ja	(Sweden) Maria Bengtsson (Sweden) Christine Magnusson	8–15, 15–5, 15–1	(gold) Winner
1986	German Open	(South Korea) Kim Yun-ja	(South Korea) Hwang Hye-young (South Korea) Chung So-young	15–10, 15–5	(gold) Winner
1986	Scandinavian Open	(South Korea) Kim Yun-ja	(South Korea) Chung Myung-hee (South Korea) Chung So-young	15–7, 17–14	(gold) Winner
1986	All England Open	(South Korea) Kim Yun-ja	(South Korea) Hwang Hye-young (South Korea) Chung So-young	5–15, 15–6, 8–15	(silver) Runner-Up
1986	China Open	(South Korea) Kim Yun-ja	(Indonesia) Ivana Lie (Indonesia) Verawaty Fadjrin	8–15, 10–15	(silver) Runner-Up
1988	Poona Open	(South Korea) Kim Yun-ja	(Denmark) Dorte Kjaer (Denmark) Nettie Nielsen	15–12, 15–2	(gold) Winner
