= 1987 Asian Badminton Championships =

Badminton championships

Tournament details
- Dates: 19–23 December
- Edition: 8
- Venue: Goa Stadium
- Location: Semarang, Indonesia

The Marlboro Asian Badminton Championships 1987 took place in the month of December in Semarang, Indonesia. Only men's team competition were conducted. At the end of day, China won the championships beating Indonesia in the final while South Korea won the bronze medal playoff defeating Malaysian team.

== Medalists ==
Discipline	Gold	Silver	Bronze
Men's team	China Yang Yang; Li Yongbo; Tian Bingyi; Xiong Guobao; Zhou Jincan; Zhang Qiang; Zhang Qingwu	Indonesia Eddy Kurniawan; Eddy Hartono; Alan Budikusuma; Liem Swie King; Joko Suprianto; Bobby Ertanto; Rudy Gunawan	South Korea Chung Byung-yun; Lee Deuk-choon; Sung Han-kuk; Park Sung-bae; Lee Sang-bok; Park Joo-bong; Kim Moon-soo

== Tournament ==
=== Venue ===
The tournament was held at the Goa Stadium in Semarang, Indonesia.

=== Draw ===
The draw was revealed on 23 November 1989. A total of 16 countries entered the tournament. Eight countries will compete in the preliminary round which will feature two groups, Group 1 and Group 2. The winner and runner-up of their group will advance to the second round which features four groups, Group A, Group B, Group C and Group D. Group winners in the second round will advance to the knockout stage.

Group A	Group B	Group C	Group D
China; Hong Kong; Singapore	South Korea; Japan; Nepal; Sri Lanka	Burma; India; Malaysia; Pakistan	Indonesia; Philippines; Thailand; Chinese Taipei

== Group stage ==
All times are West Indonesia Time (UTC+07:00).

=== Group A ===
Pos	Team	Pld	W	L	MF	MA	MD	GF	GA	GD	Pts	Qualification
1	China	2	2	0	10	0	+10	20	0	+20	2	Knockout stage
2	Singapore	2	1	1	5	5	0	10	10	0	1	
3	Hong Kong	2	0	2	0	10	−10	2	20	−18	0	

China
5
Goa Stadium
19 December 1987

Hong Kong
0

			1	2	3
1	(China) (Hong Kong)	Yang Yang; Yeung Yik Kei	15; 8	15; 12
2	(China) (Hong Kong)	Xiong Guobao; Chan Siu Kwong	15; 0	15; 5
3	(China) (Hong Kong)	Li Yongbo / Tian Bingyi; Chan Siu Kwong / Lai Hung	18; 15	15; 8
4	(China) (Hong Kong)	Zhang Qiang / Zhou Jincan; Poon Fai Hung / Tsui Chau Lam	15; 3	15; 1
5	(China) (Hong Kong)	Zhang Qingwu; Lai Hung	15; 8	15; 1

Hong Kong
0
Goa Stadium
20 December 1987

Singapore
5

			1	2	3
1	(Hong Kong) (Singapore)	Yeung Yik Kei; Lau Wing Cheok	9; 15	12; 15
2	(Hong Kong) (Singapore)	Tsui Chau Lam; Hamid Khan	7; 15	5; 15
3	(Hong Kong) (Singapore)	Chan Siu Kwong / Lai Hung; Hamid Khan / Lau Wing Cheok	18; 16	2; 15	4; 15
4	(Hong Kong) (Singapore)	Poon Fai Hung / Yeung Yik Kei; Kelly Wee / Wong Kong Kay	15; 9	3; 15	11; 15
5	(Hong Kong) (Singapore)	Lai Hung; Chong Soon Onn	3; 15	4; 15

China
5
Goa Stadium
22 December 1987

Singapore
0

			1	2	3
1	(China) (Singapore)	Yang Yang; Lau Wing Cheok	15; 8	15; 6
2	(China) (Singapore)	Xiong Guobao; Hamid Khan	15; 5	15; 6
3	(China) (Singapore)	Li Yongbo / Tian Bingyi; Hamid Khan / Lau Wing Cheok	15; 5	15; 6
4	(China) (Singapore)	Zhang Qiang / Zhou Jincan; Chong Soon Onn / Wong Kong Kay	15; 3	15; 4
5	(China) (Singapore)	Zhang Qingwu; Benson Wong	15; 5	15; 6

=== Group B ===
Pos	Team	Pld	W	L	MF	MA	MD	GF	GA	GD	Pts	Qualification
1	South Korea	3	3	0	14	1	+13	28	4	+24	3	Knockout stage
2	Japan	3	2	1	10	5	+5	22	10	+12	2	
3	Sri Lanka	3	1	2	4	11	−7	9	24	−15	1	
4	Nepal	3	0	3	2	13	−11	4	27	−23	0	

South Korea
5
Goa Stadium
19 December 1987

Nepal
0

			1	2	3
1	(South Korea) (Nepal)	Sung Han-kook; Ramji Bahadur Shrestha	15; 5	15; 8
2	(South Korea) (Nepal)	Park Sung-bae; Naresh Bahadur Singh	15; 1	15; 4
3	(South Korea) (Nepal)	Kim Moon-soo / Park Joo-bong; Ramji Bahadur Shrestha / Naresh Bahadur Singh	15; 2	15; 2
4	(South Korea) (Nepal)	Lee Deuk-choon / Lee Sang-bok; Pratap Adhikari / Prakash Rana	15; 0	15; 5
5	(South Korea) (Nepal)	Chung Byung-yun; Lava Shrestha	15; 1	15; 3

South Korea
4
Goa Stadium
20 December 1987

Sri Lanka
1

			1	2	3
1	(South Korea) (Sri Lanka)	Park Joo-bong; Niroshan Wijekoon	15; 8	15; 11
2	(South Korea) (Sri Lanka)	Chung Byung-yun; Udaya Weerakoon	4; 15	7; 15
3	(South Korea) (Sri Lanka)	Lee Deuk-choon / Sung Han-kook; Udaya Weerakoon / Niroshan Wijekoon	15; 2	15; 4
4	(South Korea) (Sri Lanka)	Kim Moon-soo / Park Sung-bae; Ranil Uduwela / Nihal Sendanayaka	15; 3	15; 2
5	(South Korea) (Sri Lanka)	Lee Sang-bok; Prasanna Gunasekera	15; 5	15; 0

South Korea
5
Goa Stadium
21 December 1987

Japan
0

			1	2	3
1	(South Korea) (Japan)	Park Sung-bae; Hiroshi Nishiyama	15; 1	17; 14
2	(South Korea) (Japan)	Sung Han-kook; Shuji Matsuno	8; 15	15; 2	15; 10
3	(South Korea) (Japan)	Kim Moon-soo / Park Joo-bong; Tetsuaki Inoue / Yasumasa Tsujita	15; 6	15; 8
4	(South Korea) (Japan)	Lee Deuk-choon / Lee Sang-bok; Shuji Matsuno / Tatsuya Yanagiya	15; 12	18; 13
5	(South Korea) (Japan)	Chung Byung-yun; Masami Osanai	7; 15	15; 10	15; 12

Sri Lanka
3
Goa Stadium
21 December 1987

Nepal
2

			1	2	3
1	(Sri Lanka) (Nepal)	Niroshan Wijekoon; Ramji Bahadur Shrestha	15; 7	15; 3
2	(Sri Lanka) (Nepal)	Udaya Weerakoon; Naresh Bahadur Singh	18; 15	13; 18	10; 15
3	(Sri Lanka) (Nepal)	Prasanna Gunasekera; Prakash Rana	15; 10	15; 8
4	(Sri Lanka) (Nepal)	Prasanna Gunasekera / Nihal Sendanayaka; Ramji Bahadur Shrestha / Naresh Bahadur Singh	15; 8	15; 3
5	(Sri Lanka) (Nepal)	Udaya Weerakoon / Niroshan Wijekoon; Pratap Adhikari / Prakash Rana	6; 15	12; 15

Japan
5
Goa Stadium
22 December 1987

Sri Lanka
0

			1	2	3
1	(Japan) (Sri Lanka)	Shuji Matsuno; Niroshan Wijekoon	15; 10	17; 14
2	(Japan) (Sri Lanka)	Yasumasa Tsujita; Udaya Weerakoon	15; 6	15; 0
3	(Japan) (Sri Lanka)	Masami Osanai; Prasanna Gunasekera	15; 5	15; 3
4	(Japan) (Sri Lanka)	Masami Osanai / Tatsuya Yanagiya; Udaya Weerakoon / Niroshan Wijekoon	17; 16	15; 3
5	(Japan) (Sri Lanka)	Tetsuaki Inoue / Hiroshi Nishiyama; Ranil Uduwela / Nihal Sendanayaka	15; 4	15; 4

Japan
5
Goa Stadium
22 December 1987

Nepal
0

			1	2	3
1	(Japan) (Nepal)	Shuji Matsuno; Ramji Bahadur Shrestha	15; 5	15; 8
2	(Japan) (Nepal)	Yasumasa Tsujita; Naresh Bahadur Singh	15; 2	15; 1
3	(Japan) (Nepal)	Masami Osanai; Lava Shrestha	15; 1	15; 7
4	(Japan) (Nepal)	Masami Osanai / Tatsuya Yanagiya; Ramji Bahadur Shrestha / Naresh Bahadur Singh	15; 12	15; 5
5	(Japan) (Nepal)	Tetsuaki Inoue / Hiroshi Nishiyama; Pratap Adhikari / Prakash Rana	15; 3	15; 5

=== Group C ===
Pos	Team	Pld	W	L	MF	MA	MD	GF	GA	GD	Pts	Qualification
1	Malaysia	3	3	0	15	0	+15	30	0	+30	3	Knockout stage
2	India	3	2	1	8	7	+1	17	14	+3	2	
3	Burma	3	1	2	5	10	−5	13	22	−9	1	
4	Pakistan	3	0	3	2	13	−11	5	28	−23	0	

Malaysia
5
Goa Stadium
19 December 1987

Pakistan
0

			1	2	3
1	(Malaysia) (Pakistan)	Foo Kok Keong; Iqbal Hussain	15; 5	15; 3
2	(Malaysia) (Pakistan)	Kwan Yoke Meng; Sher Afghan	15; 6	15; 3
3	(Malaysia) (Pakistan)	Jalani Sidek / Razif Sidek; Iqbal Hussain / Nadeem Ur Rahman	15; 0	15; 1
4	(Malaysia) (Pakistan)	Cheah Soon Kit / Ong Beng Teong; Sher Afghan / Zahid Maqbool	15; 1	15; 6
5	(Malaysia) (Pakistan)	Wong Tat Meng; Nadeem Ur Rahman	15; 3	15; 4

Malaysia
5
Goa Stadium
20 December 1987

Burma
0

			1	2	3
1	(Malaysia) (Myanmar)	Foo Kok Keong; Tun Htein Win	15; 8	15; 1
2	(Malaysia) (Myanmar)	Kwan Yoke Meng; Myo Thant	15; 2	15; 2
3	(Malaysia) (Myanmar)	Jalani Sidek / Razif Sidek; Tun Htein Win / Maung Maung	15; 3	15; 7
4	(Malaysia) (Myanmar)	Cheah Soon Kit / Ong Beng Teong; Myint Han / Myo Thant	15; 1	15; 2
5	(Malaysia) (Myanmar)	Wong Tat Meng; Maung Maung	15; 6	15; 9

Pakistan
2
Goa Stadium
21 December 1987

Burma
3

			1	2	3
1	(Pakistan) (Myanmar)	Sher Afghan; Tun Htein Win	10; 15	15; 10	15; 10
2	(Pakistan) (Myanmar)	Iqbal Hussain; Myo Thant	13; 15	15; 4	15; 8
3	(Pakistan) (Myanmar)	Nadeem Ur Rahman; Maung Maung	7; 15	5; 15
4	(Pakistan) (Myanmar)	Sher Afghan / Zahid Maqbool; Tun Htein Win / Maung Maung	14; 17	3; 15
5	(Pakistan) (Myanmar)	Iqbal Hussain / Nadeem Ur Rahman; Myint Han / Myo Thant	15; 7	2; 15	11; 15

Malaysia
5
Goa Stadium
21 December 1987

India
0

			1	2	3
1	(Malaysia) (India)	Foo Kok Keong; Vikram Singh	15; 4	15; 6
2	(Malaysia) (India)	Kwan Yoke Meng; Harjeet Singh	15; 3	15; 10
3	(Malaysia) (India)	Jalani Sidek / Razif Sidek; Rajeev Bagga / Sanjay Sharma	15; 8	15; 2
4	(Malaysia) (India)	Cheah Soon Kit / Ong Beng Teong; Partho Ganguli / Vikram Singh	15; 3	17; 14
5	(Malaysia) (India)	Wong Tat Meng; Rajeev Bagga	15; 4	15; 7

India
3
Goa Stadium
22 December 1987

Burma
2

			1	2	3
1	(India) (Myanmar)	Vikram Singh; Tun Htein Win	15; 13	15; 4
2	(India) (Myanmar)	Harjeet Singh; Myo Thant	15; 6	15; 2
3	(India) (Myanmar)	Rajeev Bagga; Maung Maung	8; 15	3; 15
4	(India) (Myanmar)	Rajeev Bagga / Sanjay Sharma; Tun Htein Win / Maung Maung	15; 6	13; 15	15; 18
5	(India) (Myanmar)	Partho Ganguli / Vikram Singh; Myint Han / Myo Thant	18; 14	13; 15	15; 7

India
5
Goa Stadium
22 December 1987

Pakistan
0

			1	2	3
1	(India) (Pakistan)	Vikram Singh; Iqbal Hussain	15; 8	15; 9
2	(India) (Pakistan)	Harjeet Singh; Sher Afghan	15; 9	15; 12
3	(India) (Pakistan)	Rajeev Bagga / Sanjay Sharma; Iqbal Hussain / Nadeem Ur Rahman	15; 5	15; 9
4	(India) (Pakistan)	Partho Ganguli / Vikram Singh; Sher Afghan / Zahid Maqbool	15; 5	15; 7
5	(India) (Pakistan)	Rajeev Bagga; Nadeem Ur Rahman	15; 8	15; 12

=== Group D ===
Pos	Team	Pld	W	L	MF	MA	MD	GF	GA	GD	Pts	Qualification
1	Indonesia (H)	3	3	0	15	0	+15	30	1	+29	3	Knockout stage
2	Thailand	3	2	1	9	6	+3	19	15	+4	2	
3	Chinese Taipei	3	1	2	6	9	−3	13	18	−5	1	
4	Philippines	3	0	3	0	15	−15	2	30	−28	0	

Indonesia
5
Goa Stadium
19 December 1987

Chinese Taipei
0

			1	2	3
1	(Indonesia) (Chinese Taipei)	Eddy Kurniawan; Chang Wen-sung	18; 17	15; 3
2	(Indonesia) (Chinese Taipei)	Alan Budikusuma; Chen Neng-piao	15; 5	15; 1
3	(Indonesia) (Chinese Taipei)	Eddy Hartono / Liem Swie King; Ger Shin-ming / Chung Chia-chen	15; 4	15; 5
4	(Indonesia) (Chinese Taipei)	Bobby Ertanto / Rudy Gunawan; Chen Kung / Chen Neng-piao	15; 6	15; 5
5	(Indonesia) (Chinese Taipei)	Joko Suprianto; Chung Chia-chen	15; 6	15; 5

Indonesia
5
Goa Stadium
20 December 1987

Thailand
0

			1	2	3
1	(Indonesia) (Thailand)	Eddy Kurniawan; Sompol Kukasemkij	16; 17	15; 10	15; 12
2	(Indonesia) (Thailand)	Alan Budikusuma; Pramote Teerawiwatana	15; 4	15; 3
3	(Indonesia) (Thailand)	Eddy Hartono / Liem Swie King; Chaiwat Chaloempusitarak / Mongkol Gumlaitong	15; 4	15; 6
4	(Indonesia) (Thailand)	Bobby Ertanto / Rudy Gunawan; Pramote Teerawiwatana / Patpong Thongsari	15; 5	15; 4
5	(Indonesia) (Thailand)	Joko Suprianto; Kasemsak Chatujinda	15; 1	15; 9

Thailand
5
Goa Stadium
21 December 1987

Philippines
0

			1	2	3
1	(Thailand) (Philippines)	Sompol Kukasemkij; Antonio Mance Jr.	15; 8	15; 11
2	(Thailand) (Philippines)	Pramote Teerawiwatana; Salvador Banquiles	15; 10	10; 15	15; 1
3	(Thailand) (Philippines)	Kasemsak Chatujinda; Anthony Ave	15; 6	15; 1
4	(Thailand) (Philippines)	Chaiwat Chaloempusitarak / Mongkol Gumlaitong; Joselito Abilagoyo / Antonio Mance Jr.	15; 9	11; 15	17; 14
5	(Thailand) (Philippines)	Pramote Teerawiwatana / Patpong Thongsari; Anthony Ave / Salvador Banquiles	15; 4	15; 7

Indonesia
5
Goa Stadium
21 December 1987

Philippines
0

			1	2	3
1	(Indonesia) (Philippines)	Eddy Kurniawan; Antonio Mance Jr.	15; 6	15; 2
2	(Indonesia) (Philippines)	Alan Budikusuma; Salvador Banquiles	15; 1	15; 1
3	(Indonesia) (Philippines)	Bobby Ertanto / Rudy Gunawan; Joselito Abilagoyo / Antonio Mance Jr.	15; 1	15; 0
4	(Indonesia) (Philippines)	Eddy Hartono / Liem Swie King; Anthony Ave / Salvador Banquiles	15; 3	15; 2
5	(Indonesia) (Philippines)	Joko Suprianto; Joselito Abilagoyo	15; 1	15; 0

Thailand
4
Goa Stadium
22 December 1987

Chinese Taipei
1

			1	2	3
1	(Thailand) (Chinese Taipei)	Sompol Kukasemkij; Chang Wen-sung	11; 15	1; 15
2	(Thailand) (Chinese Taipei)	Pramote Teerawiwatana; Chen Neng-piao	14; 15	18; 15	15; 14
3	(Thailand) (Chinese Taipei)	Kasemsak Chatujinda; Chung Chia-chen	15; 4	15; 11
4	(Thailand) (Chinese Taipei)	Chaiwat Chaloempusitarak / Mongkol Gumlaitong; Ger Shin-ming / Chung Chia-chen	17; 15	15; 10
5	(Thailand) (Chinese Taipei)	Pramote Teerawiwatana / Patpong Thongsari; Chen Kung / Chen Neng-piao	15; 10	15; 11

Chinese Taipei
5
Goa Stadium
22 December 1987

Philippines
0

			1	2	3
1	(Chinese Taipei) (Philippines)	Chang Wen-sung; Antonio Mance Jr.	15; 6	15; 5
2	(Chinese Taipei) (Philippines)	Chen Neng-piao; Salvador Banquiles	15; 8	15; 4
3	(Chinese Taipei) (Philippines)	Chung Chia-chen; Anthony Ave	15; 7	15; 5
4	(Chinese Taipei) (Philippines)	Ger Shin-ming / Chung Chia-chen; Joselito Abilagoyo / Antonio Mance Jr.	15; 12	15; 10
5	(Chinese Taipei) (Philippines)	Chen Kung / Chen Neng-piao; Anthony Ave / Salvador Banquiles	15; 11	15; 9

== Knockout stage ==
=== Bracket ===
Semi-finals
China	3
South Korea	0
Malaysia	0
Indonesia	3

Final
China	3
Indonesia	2
Third place
South Korea	5
Malaysia	0

=== Semi-finals ===
China
3
Goa Stadium
22 December 1987

South Korea
0

			1	2	3
1	(China) (South Korea)	Yang Yang; Park Sung-bae	11; 15	15; 4	17; 16
2	(China) (South Korea)	Xiong Guobao; Sung Han-kook	15; 6	15; 2
3	(China) (South Korea)	Tian Bingyi / Li Yongbo; Park Joo-bong / Kim Moon-soo	3; 15	15; 12	15; 1
4	(China) (South Korea)	Zhang Qiang / Zhou Jincan; Lee Deuk-choon / Lee Sang-bok				not played
5	(China) (South Korea)	Zhang Qingwu; Chung Byung-yun				not played

Malaysia
0
Goa Stadium
22 December 1987

Indonesia
3

			1	2	3
1	(Malaysia) (Indonesia)	Foo Kok Keong; Alan Budikusuma	14; 17	15; 9	5; 15
2	(Malaysia) (Indonesia)	Kwan Yoke Meng; Joko Suprianto	4; 15	3; 15
3	(Malaysia) (Indonesia)	Jalani Sidek / Razif Sidek; Eddy Hartono / Liem Swie King	15; 9	11; 15	1; 8	retired
4	(Malaysia) (Indonesia)	Cheah Soon Kit / Ong Beng Teong; Bobby Ertanto / Rudy Gunawan				not played
5	(Malaysia) (Indonesia)	Wong Tat Meng; Eddy Kurniawan				not played

- Razif Sidek suffered a stomach injury in third match.

=== Third place ===
Malaysia
0
Goa Stadium
23 December 1987

South Korea
5

			1	2	3
1	(Malaysia) (South Korea)	Foo Kok Keong; Park Sung-bae	5; 15	10; 15
2	(Malaysia) (South Korea)	Kwan Yoke Meng; Sung Han-kook	3; 15	10; 15
3	(Malaysia) (South Korea)	Jalani Sidek / Wong Tat Meng; Park Joo-bong / Kim Moon-soo	6; 15	5; 15
4	(Malaysia) (South Korea)	Ong Beng Teong / Cheah Soon Kit; Lee Deuk-choon / Lee Sang-bok	8; 15	15; 4	6; 15
5	(Malaysia) (South Korea)	Wong Tat Meng; Chung Byung-yun	9; 15	10; 15

=== Final ===
==== China vs Indonesia ====
China
3
Goa Stadium
23 December 1987

Indonesia
2

			1	2	3
1	(China) (Indonesia)	Yang Yang; Eddy Kurniawan	12; 15	15; 3	15; 4
2	(China) (Indonesia)	Xiong Guobao; Alan Budikusuma	17; 18	13; 15
3	(China) (Indonesia)	Tian Bingyi / Li Yongbo; Eddy Hartono / Liem Swie King	15; 13	15; 5
4	(China) (Indonesia)	Zhang Qiang / Zhou Jincan; Bobby Ertanto / Rudy Gunawan	17; 16	11; 15	10; 15
5	(China) (Indonesia)	Zhang Qingwu; Joko Suprianto	15; 8	15; 12
