= 1989 Asian Badminton Championships =

Badminton championships

Tournament details
- Dates: 18 – 23 December
- Edition: 9
- Venue: Shanghai Indoor Stadium
- Location: Shanghai, China

Champions
- Men's teams: China

The 1989 Asian Badminton Championships was the 9th edition of Badminton Asia Championships. It took place from December 18 to December 23, 1989 in Shanghai, China. Only the team competition for men's teams was held. Chinese Men's team won the crown.

== Medalists ==
Event	Gold	Silver	Bronze
Men's team	China; Wu Wenkai; Li Yongbo; Tian Bingyi; Xiong Guobao; Huang Zhanzhong; Zheng Yumin; Zhao Jianhua; Liu Jun	Indonesia; Aryono Miranat; Richard Mainaky; Alan Budikusuma; Bagus Setiadi; Imay Hendra; Joko Suprianto; Icuk Sugiarto; Hermawan Susanto	South Korea; Choi Sang-bum; Pyun Kwang-min; Sung Han-kuk; Shon Jin-hwan; Kwak Chan-ho; Park Joo-bong; Kim Moon-soo; Kim Hak-kyun
Men's team	China; Wu Wenkai; Li Yongbo; Tian Bingyi; Xiong Guobao; Huang Zhanzhong; Zheng Yumin; Zhao Jianhua; Liu Jun	Indonesia; Aryono Miranat; Richard Mainaky; Alan Budikusuma; Bagus Setiadi; Imay Hendra; Joko Suprianto; Icuk Sugiarto; Hermawan Susanto	Malaysia; Rashid Sidek; Jalani Sidek; Wong Tat Meng; Ong Ewe Chye; Cheah Soon Kit; Soo Beng Kiang; Kwan Yoke Meng

== Tournament ==
=== Venue ===
The tournament was held at the Shanghai Indoor Stadium in Shanghai, China.

=== Draw ===
The draw was revealed on 23 November 1989. A total of 16 countries entered the tournament. Eight countries will compete in the preliminary round which will feature two groups, Group 1 and Group 2. The winner and runner-up of their group will advance to the second round which features four groups, Group A, Group B, Group C and Group D. Group winners in the second round will advance to the knockout stage.

- Preliminary round

Group 1	Group 2
Bangladesh; North Korea; Pakistan; Sri Lanka	Hong Kong; Iran; Nepal; Singapore

- Second round

Group A	Group B	Group C	Group D
Indonesia; Japan: Group 1 runner-up	India; Malaysia: Group 1 winner	South Korea; Chinese Taipei: Group 2 winner	China; Thailand: Group 2 runner-up

== Group stage ==
All times are China Standard Time (UTC+08:00).

=== Preliminary round ===
==== Group 1 ====
Pos	Team	Pld	W	L	MF	MA	MD	GF	GA	GD	PF	PA	PD	Pts	Qualification
1	Sri Lanka	3	3	0	0	0	0	0	0	0	0	0	0	3	Second round
2	North Korea	3	2	1	0	0	0	0	0	0	0	0	0	2	Second round
3	Pakistan	3	1	2	0	0	0	0	0	0	0	0	0	1	
4	Bangladesh	3	0	3	0	0	0	0	0	0	0	0	0	0	

Source: NewspaperSG

Sri Lanka
3
Shanghai Indoor Stadium
19 December 1989

North Korea
2

		1	2	3
1	(Sri Lanka) (North Korea)
2	(Sri Lanka) (North Korea)
3	(Sri Lanka) (North Korea)
4	(Sri Lanka) (North Korea)
5	(Sri Lanka) (North Korea)

Sri Lanka
4
Shanghai Indoor Stadium
18 December 1989

Pakistan
1

		1	2	3
1	(Sri Lanka) (Pakistan)
2	(Sri Lanka) (Pakistan)
3	(Sri Lanka) (Pakistan)
4	(Sri Lanka) (Pakistan)
5	(Sri Lanka) (Pakistan)

Sri Lanka
5
Shanghai Indoor Stadium
18 December 1989

Bangladesh
0

		1	2	3
1	(Sri Lanka) (Bangladesh)
2	(Sri Lanka) (Bangladesh)
3	(Sri Lanka) (Bangladesh)
4	(Sri Lanka) (Bangladesh)
5	(Sri Lanka) (Bangladesh)

North Korea
5
Shanghai Indoor Stadium
19 December 1989

Pakistan
0

		1	2	3
1	(North Korea) (Pakistan)
2	(North Korea) (Pakistan)
3	(North Korea) (Pakistan)
4	(North Korea) (Pakistan)
5	(North Korea) (Pakistan)

North Korea
5
Shanghai Indoor Stadium
18 December 1989

Bangladesh
0

		1	2	3
1	(North Korea) (Bangladesh)
2	(North Korea) (Bangladesh)
3	(North Korea) (Bangladesh)
4	(North Korea) (Bangladesh)
5	(North Korea) (Bangladesh)

Pakistan
5
Shanghai Indoor Stadium
19 December 1989

Bangladesh
0

		1	2	3
1	(Pakistan) (Bangladesh)
2	(Pakistan) (Bangladesh)
3	(Pakistan) (Bangladesh)
4	(Pakistan) (Bangladesh)
5	(Pakistan) (Bangladesh)

==== Group 2 ====
Pos	Team	Pld	W	L	MF	MA	MD	GF	GA	GD	PF	PA	PD	Pts	Qualification
1	Hong Kong	3	3	0	0	0	0	0	0	0	0	0	0	3	Second round
2	Singapore	3	2	1	0	0	0	0	0	0	0	0	0	2	Second round
3	Iran	3	1	2	0	0	0	0	0	0	0	0	0	1	
4	Nepal	3	0	3	0	0	0	0	0	0	0	0	0	0	

Source: NewspaperSG

Hong Kong
5
Shanghai Indoor Stadium
19 December 1989

Singapore
0

			1	2	3
1	(Hong Kong) (Singapore)	Yeung Yik Kei; Abdul Hamid Khan	15; 0	15; 4
2	(Hong Kong) (Singapore)	Tse Bun; Donald Koh	15; 11	11; 15	15; 9
3	(Hong Kong) (Singapore)	Chan Kin Ngai; Lim Boon Leng	15; 9	15; 9
4	(Hong Kong) (Singapore)	Chan Chi Choi / Chan Siu Kwong; Donald Koh / Yow Chong Liang	15; 3	15; 4
5	(Hong Kong) (Singapore)	Chan Kin Ngai / Ng Pak Kum; Lee Suan Soon / You Kok Kiong	15; 5	15; 5

Hong Kong
5
Shanghai Indoor Stadium
18 December 1989

Iran
0

		1	2	3
1	(Hong Kong) (Iran)
2	(Hong Kong) (Iran)
3	(Hong Kong) (Iran)
4	(Hong Kong) (Iran)
5	(Hong Kong) (Iran)

Hong Kong
5
Shanghai Indoor Stadium
18 December 1989

Nepal
0

		1	2	3
1	(Hong Kong) (Nepal)
2	(Hong Kong) (Nepal)
3	(Hong Kong) (Nepal)
4	(Hong Kong) (Nepal)
5	(Hong Kong) (Nepal)

Singapore
5
Shanghai Indoor Stadium
18 December 1989

Nepal
0

			1	2	3
1	(Singapore) (Nepal)	Abdul Hamid Khan; Prakash Rana	15; 0	15; 4
2	(Singapore) (Nepal)	Donald Koh; Ramjee Shrestha	15; 2	15; 4
3	(Singapore) (Nepal)	Abdul Hamid Khan / Lim Boon Leng; Naresh Bahadur Singh / Ramjee Shrestha	15; 1	15; 0
4	(Singapore) (Nepal)	Lee Suan Soon / Yow Chong Liang; Sudeep Yonja / Anoj Basnet	15; 5	15; 3
5	(Singapore) (Nepal)	You Kok Kiong; Pratap Adhikari	15; 9	15; 12

Singapore
4
Shanghai Indoor Stadium
19 December 1989

Iran
1

			1	2	3
1	(Singapore) (Iran)	Abdul Hamid Khan; Nasim Hamid	15; 5	15; 1
2	(Singapore) (Iran)	Donald Koh; Bahador Zakizaleh	11; 15	15; 10	15; 8
3	(Singapore) (Iran)	Lee Suan Soon; Shakouri Mansour	9; 15	10; 15
4	(Singapore) (Iran)	Abdul Hamid Khan / Lim Boon Leng; Nasim Hamid / Shakouri Mansour	15; 5	15; 1
5	(Singapore) (Iran)	You Kok Kiong / Yow Chong Liang; Bahram Arabi / Shahram Arabi	15; 5	15; 2

Iran
3
Shanghai Indoor Stadium
19 December 1989

Nepal
2

		1	2	3
1	(Iran) (Nepal)
2	(Iran) (Nepal)
3	(Iran) (Nepal)
4	(Iran) (Nepal)
5	(Iran) (Nepal)

=== Second round ===
==== Group A ====
Pos	Team	Pld	W	L	MF	MA	MD	GF	GA	GD	PF	PA	PD	Pts	Qualification
1	Indonesia	2	2	0	0	0	0	0	0	0	0	0	0	2	Semi-finals
2	Japan	2	1	1	0	0	0	0	0	0	0	0	0	1	
3	North Korea	2	0	2	0	0	0	0	0	0	0	0	0	0	

Source: NewspaperSG

Japan
4
Shanghai Indoor Stadium
20 December 1989, 09:00

North Korea
1

		1	2	3
1	(Japan) (North Korea)
2	(Japan) (North Korea)
3	(Japan) (North Korea)
4	(Japan) (North Korea)
5	(Japan) (North Korea)

Indonesia
5
Shanghai Indoor Stadium
20 December 1989, 18:00

North Korea
0

		1	2	3
1	(Indonesia) (North Korea)
2	(Indonesia) (North Korea)
3	(Indonesia) (North Korea)
4	(Indonesia) (North Korea)
5	(Indonesia) (North Korea)

Indonesia
5
Shanghai Indoor Stadium
21 December 1989, 18:00

Japan
0

		1	2	3
1	(Indonesia) (Japan)
2	(Indonesia) (Japan)
3	(Indonesia) (Japan)
4	(Indonesia) (Japan)
5	(Indonesia) (Japan)

==== Group B ====
Pos	Team	Pld	W	L	MF	MA	MD	GF	GA	GD	PF	PA	PD	Pts	Qualification
1	Malaysia	2	2	0	0	0	0	0	0	0	0	0	0	2	Semi-finals
2	India	2	1	1	0	0	0	0	0	0	0	0	0	1	
3	Sri Lanka	2	0	2	0	0	0	0	0	0	0	0	0	0	

Source: NewspaperSG

India
5
Shanghai Indoor Stadium
20 December 1989, 09:00

Sri Lanka
0

			1	2	3
1	(India) (Sri Lanka)	Dipankar Bhattacharjee; Niroshan Wijekoon
2	(India) (Sri Lanka)	Rajeev Bagga; Nishantha Jayasinghe
3	(India) (Sri Lanka)	Praveen Kumar; Thushara Edirisinghe
4	(India) (Sri Lanka)	Dipankar Bhattacharjee / George Thomas; Niroshan Wijekoon / Duminda Jayakody
5	(India) (Sri Lanka)	Rajeev Bagga / Praveen Kumar; Thushara Edirisinghe / Nishantha Jayasinghe

Malaysia
5
Shanghai Indoor Stadium
20 December 1989, 18:00

Sri Lanka
0

			1	2	3
1	(Malaysia) (Sri Lanka)	Rashid Sidek; Niroshan Wijekoon	15; 0	15; 8
2	(Malaysia) (Sri Lanka)	Wong Tat Meng; Nishantha Jayasinghe	15; 7	15; 3
3	(Malaysia) (Sri Lanka)	Cheah Soon Kit / Jalani Sidek; Niroshan Wijekoon / Duminda Jayakody	15; 1	15; 2
4	(Malaysia) (Sri Lanka)	Razif Sidek / Soo Beng Kiang; Thushara Edirisinghe / Nishantha Jayasinghe
5	(Malaysia) (Sri Lanka)	Kwan Yoke Meng; Thushara Edirisinghe

Malaysia
5
Shanghai Indoor Stadium
21 December 1989, 18:00

India
0

			1	2	3
1	(Malaysia) (India)	Rashid Sidek; Dipankar Bhattacharjee
2	(Malaysia) (India)	Wong Tat Meng; Rajeev Bagga
3	(Malaysia) (India)	Kwan Yoke Meng; Praveen Kumar
4	(Malaysia) (India)	Jalani Sidek / Razif Sidek; Dipankar Bhattacharjee / George Thomas
5	(Malaysia) (India)	Cheah Soon Kit / Soo Beng Kiang; Rajeev Bagga / Praveen Kumar

==== Group C ====
Pos	Team	Pld	W	L	MF	MA	MD	GF	GA	GD	PF	PA	PD	Pts	Qualification
1	South Korea	2	2	0	0	0	0	0	0	0	0	0	0	2	Semi-finals
2	Chinese Taipei	2	1	1	0	0	0	0	0	0	0	0	0	1	
3	Hong Kong	2	0	2	0	0	0	0	0	0	0	0	0	0	

Source: cn.govopendata.com

Chinese Taipei
4
Shanghai Indoor Stadium
20 December 1989, 09:00

Hong Kong
1

			1	2	3
1	(Chinese Taipei) (Hong Kong)	Chang Wen-sung; Yeung Yik Kei	15; 10	12; 15	15; 13
2	(Chinese Taipei) (Hong Kong)	Chen Neng-piao; Tse Bun	15; 11	15; 12
3	(Chinese Taipei) (Hong Kong)	Ger Shin-ming / Yang Shih-jeng; Chan Chi Choi / Chan Siu Kwong	6; 15	10; 15
4	(Chinese Taipei) (Hong Kong)	Lee Jen-yuan / Sun Bing-hsian; Chan Kin Ngai / Ng Pak Kum	15; 5	15; 13
5	(Chinese Taipei) (Hong Kong)	Liu En-hung; Chan Kin Ngai	18; 15	15; 3

South Korea
5
Shanghai Indoor Stadium
20 December 1989, 18:00

Hong Kong
0

		1	2	3
1	(South Korea) (Hong Kong)
2	(South Korea) (Hong Kong)
3	(South Korea) (Hong Kong)
4	(South Korea) (Hong Kong)
5	(South Korea) (Hong Kong)

South Korea
4
Shanghai Indoor Stadium
21 December 1989, 18:00

Chinese Taipei
1

		1	2	3
1	(South Korea) (Chinese Taipei)
2	(South Korea) (Chinese Taipei)
3	(South Korea) (Chinese Taipei)
4	(South Korea) (Chinese Taipei)
5	(South Korea) (Chinese Taipei)

==== Group D ====
Pos	Team	Pld	W	L	MF	MA	MD	GF	GA	GD	PF	PA	PD	Pts	Qualification
1	China	2	2	0	0	0	0	0	0	0	0	0	0	2	Semi-finals
2	Thailand	2	1	1	0	0	0	0	0	0	0	0	0	1	
3	Singapore	2	0	2	0	0	0	0	0	0	0	0	0	0	

Source: cn.govopendata.com

Thailand
5
Shanghai Indoor Stadium
20 December 1989, 09:00

Singapore
0

			1	2	3
1	(Thailand) (Singapore)	Sompol Kukasemkij; Donald Koh	15; 11	15; 10
2	(Thailand) (Singapore)	Vacharapan Khamthong; You Kok Kiong	15; 2	15; 2
3	(Thailand) (Singapore)	Surachai Makkasasithorn / Pramote Teerawiwatana; Lee Suan Soon / Yow Chong Liang	15; 5	15; 5
4	(Thailand) (Singapore)	Surachet Jintanaruemit / Sompol Kukasemkij; Donald Koh / You Kok Kiong	15; 6	15; 4
5	(Thailand) (Singapore)	Surachai Makkasasithorn; Lim Boon Leng	15; 6	15; 2

China
5
Shanghai Indoor Stadium
20 December 1989, 18:00

Singapore
0

			1	2	3
1	(China) (Singapore)	Zhao Jianhua; Donald Koh	15; 4	15; 1
2	(China) (Singapore)	Wu Wenkai; You Kok Kiong	15; 6	15; 2
3	(China) (Singapore)	Li Yongbo / Tian Bingyi; Lim Boon Leng / Yow Chong Liang	15; 2	15; 6
4	(China) (Singapore)	Zheng Yumin / Huang Zhanzhong; Donald Koh / You Kok Kiong	15; 2	15; 6
5	(China) (Singapore)	Liu Jun; Lee Suan Soon	15; 2	15; 2

China
5
Shanghai Indoor Stadium
21 December 1989, 18:00

Thailand
0

			1	2	3
1	(China) (Thailand)	Zhao Jianhua; Sompol Kukasemkij
2	(China) (Thailand)	Wu Wenkai; Vacharapan Khamthong
3	(China) (Thailand)	Li Yongbo / Tian Bingyi; Surachai Makkasasithorn / Pramote Teerawiwatana
4	(China) (Thailand)	Zheng Yumin / Huang Zhanzhong; Surachet Jintanaruemit / Sompol Kukasemkij
5	(China) (Thailand)	Liu Jun; Surachai Makkasasithorn

== Knockout stage ==
=== Bracket ===
Semi-finals
16 February
China	4
South Korea	1
16 February
Malaysia	0
Indonesia	5

Final
17 February
China	5
Indonesia	0

=== Semi-finals ===
China
4
Shanghai Indoor Stadium
22 December 1989

South Korea
1

			1	2	3
1	(China) (South Korea)	Xiong Guobao; Choi Sang-bum	15; 6	15; 10
2	(China) (South Korea)	Zhao Jianhua; Phyun Kwang-min	15; 6	15; 2
3	(China) (South Korea)	Li Yongbo / Tian Bingyi; Shon Jin-hwan / Park Joo-bong	4; 15	9; 15
4	(China) (South Korea)	Huang Zhanzhong / Zheng Yumin; Sung Han-kook / Kim Moon-soo	7; 15	15; 9	15; 11
5	(China) (South Korea)	Wu Wenkai; Kwak Chan-ho	15; 8	15; 6

Malaysia
0
Shanghai Indoor Stadium
22 December 1989

Indonesia
5

			1	2	3
1	(Malaysia) (Indonesia)	Rashid Sidek; Joko Suprianto	1; 15	7; 15
2	(Malaysia) (Indonesia)	Wong Tat Meng; Icuk Sugiarto	3; 15	6; 15
3	(Malaysia) (Indonesia)	Kwan Yoke Meng; Hermawan Susanto	8; 15	3; 15
4	(Malaysia) (Indonesia)	Ong Ewe Chye / Jalani Sidek; Imay Hendra / Bagus Setiadi	17; 18	15; 17
5	(Malaysia) (Indonesia)	Soo Beng Kiang / Cheah Soon Kit; Richard Mainaky / Aryono Miranat	8; 15	3; 15

=== Final ===
China
5
Shanghai Indoor Stadium
23 December 1989

Indonesia
0

			1	2	3
1	(China) (Indonesia)	Xiong Guobao; Alan Budikusuma	7; 15	15; 10	15; 12
2	(China) (Indonesia)	Zhao Jianhua; Joko Suprianto	6; 15	15; 8	15; 5
3	(China) (Indonesia)	Li Yongbo / Tian Bingyi; Imay Hendra / Bagus Setiadi	15; 1	15; 5
4	(China) (Indonesia)	Huang Zhanzhong / Zheng Yumin; Richard Mainaky / Aryono Miranat	15; 9	15; 6
5	(China) (Indonesia)	Wu Wenkai; Icuk Sugiarto	15; 10	15; 4
