= 1988 Singapore Open (badminton) =

Unofficial individual 1988 Asian Badminton Championships

Tournament details
- Dates: 2 February 1988– 7 February 1988
- Edition: 42nd
- Total prize money: US$31,000
- Venue: Singapore Badminton Hall
- Location: Geylang, Singapore

Champions
- Men's singles: (China) Yang Yang
- Women's singles: (China) Li Lingwei
- Men's doubles: (Japan) Shuji Matsuno (Japan) Shinji Matsuura
- Women's doubles: (China) Shi Wen (China) Zhou Lei

The 1988 Singapore Open, also known as the Konica Cup - The Invitational Asian Badminton Championships, took place from 2 ~ 7 February 1988 at the Singapore Badminton Hall in Singapore. It was the second edition of this event. The total prize money on offer was US$31,000.

== Final results ==
Category	Winners	Runners-up	Score
Men's singles	(China) Yang Yang	(Thailand) Sompol Kukasemkij	15–10, 15–2
Women's singles	(China) Li Lingwei	(China) Huang Hua	12–9, 11–6
Men's doubles	(Japan) Shuji Matsuno & Shinji Matsuura	(China) Zhang Qiang & Zhou Jincan	15–5, 15–17, 15–10
Women's doubles	(China) Shi Wen & Zhou Lei	(China) Huang Hua & Tang Jiuhong	15–10, 15–12
