= 2023 BWF World Senior Championships – 55+ =

Tournament details
- Dates: 11 September 2023 – 17 September 2023
- Edition: 11
- Level: International
- Competitors: 169 from 27 nations
- Venue: Hwasan Indoor Stadium; Jeonju Indoor Badminton Hall
- Location: Jeonju, South Korea

Champions
- Men's singles: (India) Rajeev Sharma
- Women's singles: (Hong Kong) Chan Oi Ni
- Men's doubles: (England) Jon Austin (England) Rajeev Bagga
- Women's doubles: (South Korea) Chung Gil-soon (South Korea) Chung So-young
- Mixed doubles: (Sweden) Jan-Eric Antonsson (Denmark) Hanne Bertelsen

These are the results of 2023 BWF World Senior Championships' 55+ events.

== Competition schedule ==
Match was played as scheduled below.

#R	Preliminary rounds	QF	Quarter-finals	SF	Semi-finals	F	Finals

H	Hwasan Indoor Stadium	J	Jeonju Indoor Badminton Hall

Date	11 Sep		12 Sep		13 Sep		14 Sep		15 Sep	16 Sep	17 Sep
Venue	H	J	H	J	H	J	H	J	H	H	H
Men's singles	1R			2R			3R		QF	SF	F
Women's singles	1R						2R		QF	SF	F
Men's doubles	1R					2R	3R		QF	SF	F
Women's doubles						1R	2R		QF	SF	F
Mixed doubles	1R			2R			3R		QF	SF	F

== Medal summary ==
=== Medal standings ===
* Host nation (South Korea)

2023 BWF World Senior Championships medal table
Rank	Nation	Gold	Silver	Bronze	Total
1	England	1	0	3.5	4.5
2	India	1	0	1	2
3	Hong Kong	1	0	0	1
3	South Korea*	1	0	0	1
5	Sweden	0.5	0	1	1.5
6	Denmark	0.5	0	0.5	1
7	Chinese Taipei	0	3	1	4
8	Japan	0	1	0	1
9	Germany	0	0.5	0	0.5
9	Netherlands	0	0.5	0	0.5
11	Indonesia	0	0	1	1
11	Scotland	0	0	1	1
11	Thailand	0	0	1	1
Totals (13 entries)		5	5	10	20

=== Medalists ===
Event	Gold	Silver	Bronze
Men's singles	(India) Rajeev Sharma	(Chinese Taipei) Liu En-hung	(Sweden) Stefan Grahn
Men's singles	(India) Rajeev Sharma	(Chinese Taipei) Liu En-hung	(Indonesia) Joko Suprianto
Women's singles	(Hong Kong) Chan Oi Ni	(Japan) Kumiko Kushiyama	(India) Sangeeta Rajgopalan
Women's singles	(Hong Kong) Chan Oi Ni	(Japan) Kumiko Kushiyama	(Chinese Taipei) Feng Mei-ying
Men's doubles	(England) Jon Austin (England) Rajeev Bagga	(Chinese Taipei) Liu En-hung (Chinese Taipei) Tu Tung-sheng	(Thailand) Karoon Kasayapanan (Thailand) Surachai Makkasasithorn
Men's doubles	(England) Jon Austin (England) Rajeev Bagga	(Chinese Taipei) Liu En-hung (Chinese Taipei) Tu Tung-sheng	(Denmark) Henrik Lykke (Scotland) Alan McMillan
Women's doubles	(South Korea) Chung Gil-soon (South Korea) Chung So-young	(Germany) Tanja Eberl (Netherlands) Elke Nijsse-Drews	(England) Julie Bradbury (England) Debora Miller
Women's doubles	(South Korea) Chung Gil-soon (South Korea) Chung So-young	(Germany) Tanja Eberl (Netherlands) Elke Nijsse-Drews	(England) Betty Blair (Scotland) Aileen Travers
Mixed doubles	(Sweden) Jan-Eric Antonsson (Denmark) Hanne Bertelsen	(Chinese Taipei) Chou Tsai-shen (Chinese Taipei) Wang Ching-hui	(England) Jon Austin (England) Debora Miller
Mixed doubles	(Sweden) Jan-Eric Antonsson (Denmark) Hanne Bertelsen	(Chinese Taipei) Chou Tsai-shen (Chinese Taipei) Wang Ching-hui	(England) Rajeev Bagga (England) Elizabeth Austin

== Men's singles ==
=== Seeds ===
1. (Thailand) Karoon Kasayapanan (quarter-finals)
2. (Chinese Taipei) Chou Tsai-shen (second round)
3. (Sweden) Stefan Grahn (semi-finals; bronze medalist)
4. (Finland) Tarmo Martikainen (quarter-finals)
5. (India) B. V. S. K. Lingeswara Rao (quarter-finals)
6. (Indonesia) Joko Suprianto (semi-finals; bronze medalist)
7. (Sweden) Magnus Gustafsson (second round)
8. (Chinese Taipei) Liu En-hung (final; silver medalist)

=== Finals ===
Semi-finals
5/8	(Chinese Taipei) Liu En-hung	21	21
3/4	(Sweden) Stefan Grahn	14	9
(India) Rajeev Sharma	11	21	24
5/8	(Indonesia) Joko Suprianto	21	12	22

Final
5/8	(Chinese Taipei) Liu En-hung	21	20	13
(India) Rajeev Sharma	15	22	21

=== Top half ===
==== Section 1 ====
First round
(Indonesia) B Chandra	21	21
(England) G A Joyner	10	8
(Sweden) P Baeza	21	17
(Germany) S Schrader	11	11^{r}
(France) S Arbey	6	8
(India) J Dewangan	21	21
(Switzerland) U Meier	16	9
(Finland) H Väisänen	21	21
(South Korea) Kim G-h	21	21
(United States) D Grewal	3	5

Second round
1	(Thailand) K Kasayapanan	18	21	21
(Indonesia) B Chandra	21	19	16
(Japan) T Masaoka	27	21
(Sweden) P Baeza	25	7
5/8	(Chinese Taipei) Liu E-h	21	21
(India) J Dewangan	17	9
(Finland) H Väisänen	21	21
(South Korea) Kim G-h	10	13

Third round
1	(Thailand) K Kasayapanan	21	21	21
(Japan) T Masaoka	23	12	7
5/8	(Chinese Taipei) Liu E-h	21	21
(Finland) H Väisänen	17	11

Quarter-finals
1	(Thailand) K Kasayapanan	9	13
5/8	(Chinese Taipei) Liu E-h	21	21

==== Section 2 ====
First round
(England) J Austin	21	21
(United States) S Chowdhury	9	5
(Latvia) A Tērauds	21	19	21
(Japan) T Saito	15	21	14
(Finland) M Emran	w	/	o
(Hong Kong) Wong S Y
(Chinese Taipei) Lee T-c	21	14	23
(Thailand) P Srinakorn	17	21	25
(Germany) J Schmitz-Foster	21	21
(Indonesia) S H Wahono	12	10

Second round
3/4	(Sweden) S Grahn	24	21
(England) J Austin	22	12
(South Korea) Jeong B-y	16	21	16
(Latvia) A Tērauds	21	19	21
5/8	(India) B. V. S. K. Lingeswara Rao	21	21
(Finland) M Emran	9	14
(Thailand) P Srinakorn	14	22	22
(Germany) J Schmitz-Foster	21	20	20

Third round
3/4	(Sweden) S Grahn	21	21
(Latvia) A Tērauds	7	10
5/8	(India) B. V. S. K. Lingeswara Rao	21	21
(Thailand) P Srinakorn	9	11

Quarter-finals
3/4	(Sweden) S Grahn	21	21
5/8	(India) B. V. S. K. Lingeswara Rao	13	18

=== Bottom half ===
==== Section 3 ====
First round
(Germany) B Raj	21	21
(South Korea) Choi K-w	16	18
(Chinese Taipei) Chiu H-h	23	21
(Poland) A Grzechnik	21	11
(Mexico) J García	11	16
(India) R Sharma	21	21
(England) B Denison	12	7
(Japan) M Ueji	21	21
(United Arab Emirates) P Ponnengattil	14	22	11
(Thailand) P Prompuch	21	20	21

Second round
(Germany) B Raj	17	18
(Chinese Taipei) Chiu H-h	21	21
(India) R Sharma	21	21
5/8	(Sweden) M Gustafsson	13	11
(Japan) M Ueji	21	21
(Sri Lanka) A Dodampa	9	6
(Thailand) P Prompuch	18	8
3/4	(Finland) T Martikainen	21	21

Third round
(Chinese Taipei) Chiu H-h	9	17
(India) R Sharma	21	21
(Japan) M Ueji	12	10
3/4	(Finland) T Martikainen	21	21

Quarter-finals
(India) R Sharma	21	21
3/4	(Finland) T Martikainen	10	19

==== Section 4 ====
First round
(United States) D Marble	w	/	o
(India) K Singh
(Finland) J Rafols	13	20
(Thailand) C Aroonprasertkul	21	22
(Switzerland) M Schalch	19	21	19
(England) T Rogers	21	14	21
(Germany) M Kleibel	13	24	14
(Malaysia) Loh S C	21	22	21
(Japan) K Akiyama	10	3
(Sweden) E Ferenius	21	21

Second round
(United States) D Marble	8	14
(Thailand) C Aroonprasertkul	21	21
(England) T Rogers	9	13
5/8	(Indonesia) J Suprianto	21	21
(Malaysia) Loh S C	21	21
(South Korea) Ko D-g	4	12
(Sweden) E Ferenius	17	21	21
2	(Chinese Taipei) Chou T-s	21	8	17

Third round
(Thailand) C Aroonprasertkul	13	9
5/8	(Indonesia) J Suprianto	21	21
(Malaysia) Loh S C	21	8
(Sweden) E Ferenius	23	21

Quarter-finals
5/8	(Indonesia) J Suprianto	21	21
(Sweden) E Ferenius	11	14

== Women's singles ==
=== Seeds ===
1. (England) Betty Blair (second round)
2. (Germany) Tanja Eberl (quarter-finals)
3. (Poland) Dorota Grzejdak (quarter-finals)
4. (Japan) Kumiko Kushiyama (final; silver medalist)

=== Finals ===
Semi-finals
(India) Sangeeta Rajgopalan	11	10
3/4	(Japan) Kumiko Kushiyama	21	21
(Chinese Taipei) Feng Mei-ying	11	17
(Hong Kong) Chan Oi Ni	21	21

Final
3/4	(Japan) Kumiko Kushiyama	15	8
(Hong Kong) Chan Oi Ni	21	21

=== Top half ===
==== Section 1 ====
First round
(Scotland) A Travers	17	9^{r}
(India) S Rajgopalan	21	15
(Germany) M Tusche	11	13
(Netherlands) S Kroon	21	21
(South Korea) Chung G-s	21	21
(Chinese Taipei) Hsiung Y-p	12	15

Second round
1	(England) B Blair	14	21	22
(India) S Rajgopalan	21	18	24
(Netherlands) S Kroon	21	21
(South Korea) Chung G-s	19	15

Quarter-finals
(India) S Rajgopalan	21	21
(Netherlands) S Kroon	18	17

==== Section 2 ====
First round
3/4	(Japan) K Kushiyama	21	21
(Belgium) H Rovers	5	14
(India) A Jhaveri	19	10
(United Arab Emirates) S Widanalge	21	21
(United States) S Huang	15	14
(Thailand) J Thongpanangpan	21	21
(England) M Dew	17	2
(Netherlands) G Kakiay	21	21

Second round
3/4	(Japan) K Kushiyama	21	21
(United Arab Emirates) S Widanalge	11	7
(Thailand) J Thongpanangpan	14	13
(Netherlands) G Kakiay	21	21

Quarter-finals
3/4	(Japan) K Kushiyama	21	21
(Netherlands) G Kakiay	15	9

=== Bottom half ===
==== Section 3 ====
First round
(England) T Dove	6	4
(Chinese Taipei) Feng M-y	21	21
(United Arab Emirates) V P Manghnani	21	13	19
(India) J Somaiah	15	21	21
(Spain) E Segarra	12	10
(Norway) B Thyness	21	21
(Japan) R Sato	19	19
3/4	(Poland) D Grzejdak	21	21

Second round
(Chinese Taipei) Feng M-y	21	21
(India) J Somaiah	5	8
(Norway) B Thyness	20	11
3/4	(Poland) D Grzejdak	22	21

Quarter-finals
(Chinese Taipei) Feng M-y	21	22
3/4	(Poland) D Grzejdak	16	20

==== Section 4 ====
First round
(France) L Renon	6	5
(Hong Kong) Chan O N	21	21
(India) J Tessy	16	21
(England) E Austin	21	23
(United States) B Lin	22	21
(Netherlands) E Nijsse-Drews	20	10
(Thailand) V Trairatnopas	10	8
2	(Germany) T Eberl	21	21

Second round
(Hong Kong) Chan O N	21	21
(England) E Austin	12	8
(United States) B Lin	14	19
2	(Germany) T Eberl	21	21

Quarter-finals
(Hong Kong) Chan O N	21	21
2	(Germany) T Eberl	11	16

== Men's doubles ==
=== Seeds ===
1. (Thailand) Karoon Kasayapanan / Surachai Makkasasithorn (semi-finals; bronze medalists)
2. (Germany) Klaus Buschbeck / Jürgen Schmitz-Foster (second round)
3. (Thailand) Wattana Ampunsuwan / Narong Vanichitsarakul (quarter-finals)
4. (Thailand) Chaiwat Chaloempusitarak / Mongkol Gumlaitong (quarter-finals)
5. (Sweden) Peter Baeza / Stefan Grahn (third round)
6. (Indonesia) Hendry Saputra Ho / Joko Suprianto (withdrew)
7. (Chinese Taipei) Liu En-hung / Tu Tung-sheng (final; silver medalists)
8. (Denmark) Henrik Lykke / (Scotland) Alan McMillan (semi-finals; bronze medalists)

=== Finals ===
Semi-finals
1	(Thailand) Karoon Kasayapanan (Thailand) Surachai Makkasasithorn	10	21	18
(England) Jon Austin (England) Rajeev Bagga	21	12	21
5/8	(Denmark) Henrik Lykke (Scotland) Alan McMillan	16	20
5/8	(Chinese Taipei) Liu En-hung (Chinese Taipei) Tu Tung-sheng	21	22

Final
(England) Jon Austin (England) Rajeev Bagga	21	19	21
5/8	(Chinese Taipei) Liu En-hung (Chinese Taipei) Tu Tung-sheng	16	21	17

=== Top half ===
==== Section 1 ====
First round
(India) V Akula (India) B. V. S. K. Lingeswara Rao	21	21
(Germany) F Naumann (Germany) D Steger	7	6

Second round
1	(Thailand) K Kasayapanan (Thailand) S Makkasasithorn	21	21
(Chinese Taipei) Au C-w (Chinese Taipei) Lee T-c	12	12
(South Korea) Kim H-s (South Korea) Shin C	21	21
(England) D Britto (Germany) B Raj	13	8
5/8	(Indonesia) H S Ho (Indonesia) J Suprianto
(Switzerland) U Meier (Switzerland) M Schalch	w	/	o
(Finland) M Emran (Finland) P Salmi	5	14
(India) V Akula (India) B. V. S. K. Lingeswara Rao	21	21

Third round
1	(Thailand) K Kasayapanan (Thailand) S Makkasasithorn	21	21
(South Korea) Kim H-s (South Korea) Shin C	11	17
(Switzerland) U Meier (Switzerland) M Schalch	10	8
(India) V Akula (India) B. V. S. K. Lingeswara Rao	21	21

Quarter-finals
1	(Thailand) K Kasayapanan (Thailand) S Makkasasithorn	22	21
(India) V Akula (India) B. V. S. K. Lingeswara Rao	20	17

==== Section 2 ====
First round
(England) J Austin (England) R Bagga	21	18	21
(Chinese Taipei) Chiu H-h (Chinese Taipei) Chou T-s	17	21	16

Second round
3/4	(Thailand) C Chaloempusitarak (Thailand) M Gumlaitong	21	21
(South Korea) Kim H-s (South Korea) Oh K-s	12	13
(India) A Buragohain (India) T S Yumnam	13	16
(Japan) T Masaoka (Japan) T Saito	21	21
5/8	(Sweden) P Baeza (Sweden) S Grahn	w	/	o
(Germany) M Kleibel (Germany) S Schrader
(Mexico) J García (Latvia) A Tērauds	10	9
(England) J Austin (England) R Bagga	21	21

Third round
3/4	(Thailand) C Chaloempusitarak (Thailand) M Gumlaitong	21	21
(Japan) T Masaoka (Japan) T Saito	10	17
(Sweden) P Baeza (Sweden) S Grahn	21	15	18
(England) J Austin (England) R Bagga	15	21	21

Quarter-finals
3/4	(Thailand) C Chaloempusitarak (Thailand) M Gumlaitong	21	8	19
(England) J Austin (England) R Bagga	14	21	21

=== Bottom half ===
==== Section 3 ====
First round
(Sweden) E Ferenius (Sweden) F Ingemansson	21	19	21
(Japan) K Akiyama (Japan) T Kusaka	15	21	15

Second round
(Sweden) E Ferenius (Sweden) F Ingemansson	21	21
(Indonesia) V Colondam (Indonesia) S H Wahono	15	8
(United Arab Emirates) A Mayan (United Arab Emirates) P Ponnengattil	12	9
5/8	(Denmark) H Lykke (Scotland) A McMillan	21	21
(England) B Denison (England) T Rogers	21	19	13
(South Korea) Choi Y-j (South Korea) Ryu J-y	18	21	21
SUB	(India) G Jeswal (India) B Palapudi	15	13
3/4	(Thailand) W Ampunsuwan (Thailand) N Vanichitsarakul	21	21

Third round
(Sweden) E Ferenius (Sweden) F Ingemansson	11	18
5/8	(Denmark) H Lykke (Scotland) A McMillan	21	21
(South Korea) Choi Y-j (South Korea) Ryu J-y	5	8
3/4	(Thailand) W Ampunsuwan (Thailand) N Vanichitsarakul	21	21

Quarter-finals
5/8	(Denmark) H Lykke (Scotland) A McMillan	21	21
(Thailand) W Ampunsuwan (Thailand) N Vanichitsarakul	9	11

==== Section 4 ====
First round
(Indonesia) B Chandra (Indonesia) A Tandun	21	21
(South Korea) Pyo S-h (South Korea) Shin D-g	16	9

Second round
(Indonesia) B Chandra (Indonesia) A Tandun	15	18
(Thailand) T Jaruwast (Thailand) P Srinakorn	21	21
(United States) S Chowdhury (United States) D Marble	1	5
5/8	(Chinese Taipei) Liu E-h (Chinese Taipei) Tu T-s	21	21
(India) M K Rao (India) V Swaroop	21	21
(Japan) M Ueji (Japan) M Yoshizaki	13	16
(Sweden) M Bachtiar (Sweden) P Eriksson	21	22	21
2	(Germany) K Buschbeck (Germany) J Schmitz-Foster	14	24	16

Third round
(Thailand) T Jaruwast (Thailand) P Srinakorn	18	9
5/8	(Chinese Taipei) Liu E-h (Chinese Taipei) Tu T-s	21	21
(India) M K Rao (India) V Swaroop	20	19
(Sweden) M Bachtiar (Sweden) P Eriksson	22	21

Quarter-finals
5/8	(Chinese Taipei) Liu E-h (Chinese Taipei) Tu T-s	21	21
(Sweden) M Bachtiar (Sweden) P Eriksson	12	13

== Women's doubles ==
=== Seeds ===
1. (South Korea) Chung Gil-soon / Chung So-young (champion; gold medalists)
2. (Germany) Tanja Eberl / (Netherlands) Elke Nijsse-Drews (final; silver medalists)
3. (Netherlands) Sandra Kroon / Jeannette van der Werff (second round)
4. (Japan) Kumiko Kushiyama / Ritsuko Sato (second round)

=== Finals ===
Semi-finals
1	(South Korea) Chung Gil-soon (South Korea) Chung So-young	19	21	21
(England) Julie Bradbury (England) Debora Miller	21	13	16
(England) Betty Blair (Scotland) Aileen Travers	17	19
2	(Germany) Tanja Eberl (Netherlands) Elke Nijsse-Drews	21	21

Final
1	(South Korea) Chung Gil-soon (South Korea) Chung So-young	21	21
2	(Germany) Tanja Eberl (Netherlands) Elke Nijsse-Drews	6	11

=== Top half ===
==== Section 1 ====
First round
(Netherlands) G Kakiay (Norway) B Thyness	21	21
(India) M Sahasrabudhe (India) S Venglet	17	10
(Chinese Taipei) Feng M-y (Chinese Taipei) Sun T-c	21	21
(England) A Austin (England) T Dove	9	3

Second round
1	(South Korea) Chung G-s (South Korea) Chung S-y	21	21
(Netherlands) G Kakiay (Norway) B Thyness	10	8
(Japan) M Hatano (Japan) A Hosoyamada	21	21
(Chinese Taipei) Feng M-y (Chinese Taipei) Sun T-c	15	15

Quarter-finals
1	(South Korea) Chung G-s (South Korea) Chung S-y	21	21
(Japan) M Hatano (Japan) A Hosoyamada	9	8

==== Section 2 ====
First round
(Thailand) P Boonyakiat (Thailand) P Wattanajarupong	14	15
(England) J Bradbury (England) D Miller	21	21
(Poland) D Grzejdak (Belgium) H Rovers	21	21
(Chinese Taipei) Ho Y-s (Chinese Taipei) Weng C-y	13	14
(India) R N Bhave (India) K Dixit	2	13
(South Korea) Lee B-i (South Korea) Song S-y	21	21

Second round
3/4	(Netherlands) T Dove (Netherlands) J van der Werff	13	13
(England) J Bradbury (England) D Miller	21	21
(Poland) D Grzejdak (Belgium) H Rovers	19	15
(South Korea) Lee B-i (South Korea) Song S-y	21	21

Quarter-finals
(England) J Bradbury (England) D Miller	21	21
(South Korea) Lee B-i (South Korea) Song S-y	13	12

=== Bottom half ===
==== Section 3 ====
First round
(Thailand) R Boonprathump (Thailand) N Thienthong	21	21
(South Korea) Lee E-g (South Korea) Lee S-a	9	6
(Germany) A Steger (Germany) M Tusche	8	21	18
(India) J Tessy (India) J Somaiah	21	8	21
(United States) S Huang (Sri Lanka) L Punchihewa	8	9
(England) B Blair (Scotland) A Travers	21	21

Second round
(Thailand) R Boonprathump (Thailand) N Thienthong	21	21
(India) J Tessy (India) J Somaiah	15	16
(England) B Blair (Scotland) A Travers	19	21	21
3/4	(Japan) K Kushiyama (Japan) R Sato	21	19	19

Quarter-finals
(Thailand) R Boonprathump (Thailand) N Thienthong	16	21	16
(England) B Blair (Scotland) A Travers	21	13	21

==== Section 4 ====
First round
(India) S Rajgopalan (India) S Sawant	18	21	16
(England) M Joiner (England) L Pearcy	21	17	21
(Thailand) A Boonmee (Thailand) P Thongmueang	21	21
(South Korea) Jo K-j (South Korea) Kim S-a	9	6

Second round
(England) M Joiner (England) L Pearcy	21	21
(Chinese Taipei) Hsiung Y-p (Chinese Taipei) Tu H-h	9	10
(Thailand) A Boonmee (Thailand) P Thongmueang	7	8
2	(Germany) T Eberl (Netherlands) E Nijsse-Drews	21	21

Quarter-finals
(England) M Joiner (England) L Pearcy	15	17
2	(Germany) T Eberl (Netherlands) E Nijsse-Drews	21	21

== Mixed doubles ==
=== Seeds ===
1. (India) Prabhu Naik Naidu Kona / Suzanne Venglet (quarter-finals)
2. (England) Rajeev Bagga / Elizabeth Austin (semi-finals; bronze medalists)
3. (Sweden) Jan-Eric Antonsson / (Denmark) Hanne Bertelsen (champion; gold medalists)
4. (Sweden) Erik Ferenius / (Netherlands) Sandra Kroon (third round)
5. (Chinese Taipei) Liu En-hung / Tu Hsiu-hsia (second round)
6. (Scotland) Alan McMillan / Aileen Travers (quarter-finals)
7. (South Korea) Oh Kyo-sun / Chung So-young (quarter-finals)
8. (Indonesia) Alexander Tandun / Rosiana Tendean (third round)

=== Finals ===
Semi-finals
(England) Jon Austin (England) Debora Miller	20	17
(Chinese Taipei) Chou Tsai-shen (Chinese Taipei) Wang Ching-hui	22	21
3/4	(Sweden) Jan-Eric Antonsson (Denmark) Hanne Bertelsen	21	21
2	(England) Rajeev Bagga (England) Elizabeth Austin	18	17

Final
(Chinese Taipei) Chou Tsai-shen (Chinese Taipei) Wang Ching-hui	17	21
3/4	(Sweden) Jan-Eric Antonsson (Denmark) Hanne Bertelsen	21	23

=== Top half ===
==== Section 1 ====
First round
(United States) D Grewal (United States) LX Li	9	13
(Switzerland) M Schalch (Netherlands) G Kakiay	21	21

Second round
1	(India) P N N Kona (India) S Venglet	21	21
(Chinese Taipei) Au C-w (Chinese Taipei) Yu C-c	19	19
(Japan) T Kusaka (Japan) M Kusaka	21	21
(Thailand) N Vanichitsarakul (Thailand) J Banjongsilp	13	13
5/8	(Indonesia) A Tandun (Indonesia) R Tendean	21	21
(South Korea) Shin C (South Korea) Jeong G-r	7	7
(England) J Austin (England) D Miller	21	21
(Switzerland) M Schalch (Netherlands) G Kakiay	10	8

Third round
1	(India) P N N Kona (India) S Venglet	21	21
(Japan) T Kusaka (Japan) M Kusaka	12	12
5/8	(Indonesia) A Tandun (Indonesia) R Tendean	19	21	19
(England) J Austin (England) D Miller	21	16	21

Quarter-finals
1	(India) P N N Kona (India) S Venglet	10	21	14
(England) J Austin (England) D Miller	21	19	21

==== Section 2 ====
First round
(Germany) M Kleibel (Germany) T Eberl	21	21
(Poland) A Grzechnik (Poland) D Grzejdak	14	11
(India) B Palapudi (India) A Jhaveri	21	15	21
(England) T Rogers (England) A Austin	19	21	21

Second round
3/4	(Sweden) E Ferenius (Sweden) S Kroon	21	21
(Japan) S Michimoto (Japan) A Hosoyamada	11	19
(Chinese Taipei) Chou T-s (Chinese Taipei) Wang C-h	21	18	21
(Germany) M Kleibel (Germany) T Eberl	13	21	13
5/8	(South Korea) Oh K-s (South Korea) Chung S-y	21	21
(Sri Lanka) A Dodampa (Indonesia) Tjendrawati	13	7
(Thailand) P Prompuch (Thailand) N Thienthong	21	12	21
(England) T Rogers (England) A Austin	16	21	17

Third round
3/4	(Sweden) E Ferenius (Sweden) S Kroon	15	17
(Chinese Taipei) Chou T-s (Chinese Taipei) Wang C-h	21	21
5/8	(South Korea) Oh K-s (South Korea) Chung S-y	21	21
(Thailand) P Prompuch (Thailand) N Thienthong	11	19

Quarter-finals
(Chinese Taipei) Chou T-s (Chinese Taipei) Wang C-h	21	21
5/8	(South Korea) Oh K-s (South Korea) Chung S-y	17	10

=== Bottom half ===
==== Section 3 ====
First round
(South Africa) J Croukamp (South Africa) L Fry	21	16	21
(Germany) B Raj (Germany) J Felber	15	21	23
(United States) S Chowdhury (United States) S Huang	22	19	12
(England) B Denison (England) T Dove	20	21	21

Second round
(Germany) B Raj (Germany) J Felber	17	20
(South Korea) Kim H-s (South Korea) Chung G-s	21	22
(India) M K Rao (India) S Sawant	11	11
5/8	(Scotland) A McMillan (Scotland) A Travers	21	21
(England) B Denison (England) T Dove	12	7
(Thailand) T Jaruwast (Thailand) R Boonprathump	21	21
(Japan) M Yoshizaki (Japan) M Hatano	11	11
3/4	(Sweden) J-E Antonsson (Denmark) H Bertelsen	21	21

Third round
(South Korea) Kim H-s (South Korea) Chung G-s	13	10
5/8	(Scotland) A McMillan (Scotland) A Travers	21	21
(Thailand) T Jaruwast (Thailand) R Boonprathump	22	14	20
3/4	(Sweden) J-E Antonsson (Denmark) H Bertelsen	20	21	22

Quarter-finals
5/8	(Scotland) A McMillan (Scotland) A Travers	10	21	14
3/4	(Sweden) J-E Antonsson (Denmark) H Bertelsen	21	17	21

==== Section 4 ====
First round
(South Korea) Kim H-s (South Korea) You C-h	14	21
(Thailand) S Makkasasithorn (Thailand) K Makkasasithorn	21	23
(Japan) M Ueji (Japan) R Sato	21	21
(France) S Arbey (France) L Renon	8	13

Second round
(Thailand) S Makkasasithorn (Thailand) K Makkasasithorn	17	26	19
(India) V Swaroop (India) S Rajgopalan	21	24	21
(Sweden) S Grahn (Norway) B Thyness	21	21
5/8	(Chinese Taipei) Liu E-h (Chinese Taipei) Tu H-h	19	11
(Japan) M Ueji (Japan) R Sato	21	21
(Switzerland) J Schmitz-Foster (Netherlands) E Nijsse-Drews	13	14
(Germany) F Naumann (Germany) M Tusche	9	7
2	(England) R Bagga (England) E Austin	21	21

Third round
(India) V Swaroop (India) S Rajgopalan	21	15	21
(Sweden) S Grahn (Norway) B Thyness	19	21	11
(Japan) M Ueji (Japan) R Sato	21	16
2	(England) R Bagga (England) E Austin	23	21'

Quarter-finals
(India) V Swaroop (India) S Rajgopalan	12	7
2	(England) R Bagga (England) E Austin	21	21
