= 1986 Badminton World Cup =

Badminton championships

Tournament details
- Dates: 4–9 November 1986
- Edition: 8th
- Total prize money: US$118,000
- Venue: Istora Senayan
- Location: Bandung & Jakarta Indonesia

The 1986 Badminton World Cup was the eighth edition of an international tournament Badminton World Cup. The event was held in two Indonesian cities; Bandung & Jakarta. Indonesia won 3 titles while China finished with the titles from 2 disciplines.

== Medalists ==
Event	Gold	Silver	Bronze
Men's singles	(Indonesia) Icuk Sugiarto	(Denmark) Morten Frost	(China) Yang Yang
Men's singles	(Indonesia) Icuk Sugiarto	(Denmark) Morten Frost	(China) Zhao Jianhua
Women's singles	(China) Li Lingwei	(China) Han Aiping	(Denmark) Kirsten Larsen
Women's singles	(China) Li Lingwei	(China) Han Aiping	(South Korea) Hwang Hye-young
Men's doubles	(Indonesia) Bobby Ertanto (Indonesia) Liem Swie King	(Indonesia) Hadibowo (Indonesia) Rudy Heryanto	(South Korea) Kim Moon-soo (South Korea) Park Joo-bong
Men's doubles	(Indonesia) Bobby Ertanto (Indonesia) Liem Swie King	(Indonesia) Hadibowo (Indonesia) Rudy Heryanto	(China) Zhang Qiang (China) Zhou Jincan
Women's doubles	(China) Han Aiping (China) Li Lingwei	(Indonesia) Imelda Wiguna (Indonesia) Rosiana Tendean	(South Korea) Chung Myung-hee (South Korea) Hwang Hye-young
Women's doubles	(China) Han Aiping (China) Li Lingwei	(Indonesia) Imelda Wiguna (Indonesia) Rosiana Tendean	(Indonesia) Ivana Lie (Indonesia) Verawaty Fajrin
Mixed doubles	(Indonesia) Eddy Hartono (Indonesia) Verawaty Fajrin	(Denmark) Steen Fladberg (England) Gillian Clark	(Sweden) Thomas Kihlström (Sweden) Christine Magnusson
Mixed doubles	(Indonesia) Eddy Hartono (Indonesia) Verawaty Fajrin	(Denmark) Steen Fladberg (England) Gillian Clark	(Indonesia) Hafid Yusuf (Indonesia) Yanti Kusmiati

== Men's singles ==
=== Finals ===
Semi-finals
(Denmark) Morten Frost	15	15
(China) Yang Yang	9	1
(China) Zhao Jianhua	14	10
(Indonesia) Icuk Sugiarto	18	15

Final
(Denmark) Morten Frost	15	6	11
(Indonesia) Icuk Sugiarto	5	15	15

== Women's singles ==
=== Finals ===
Semi-finals
(China) Han Aiping	10	11	11
(South Korea) Hwang Hye-young	12	4	4
(Denmark) Kirsten Larsen	6	4
(China) Li Lingwei	11	11

Final
(China) Han Aiping	8	3
(China) Li Lingwei	11	11

== Men's doubles ==
=== Finals ===
Semi-finals
(Indonesia) Bobby Ertanto (Indonesia) Liem Swie King	15	15
(South Korea) Kim Moon-soo (South Korea) Park Joo-bong	11	8
(China) Zhang Qiang (China) Zhou Jincan	6	15
(Indonesia) Hadibowo (Indonesia) Rudy Heryanto	15	18

Final
(Indonesia) Bobby Ertanto (Indonesia) Liem Swie King	15	15
(Indonesia) Hadibowo (Indonesia) Rudy Heryanto	6	5

== Women's doubles ==
=== Finals ===
Semi-finals
(Indonesia) Imelda Wiguna (Indonesia) Rosiana Tendean	15	15
(Indonesia) Ivana Lie (Indonesia) Verawaty Fajrin	3	14
(South Korea) Chung Myung-hee (South Korea) Hwang Hye-young	7	7
(China) Han Aiping (China) Li Lingwei	15	15

Final
(Indonesia) Imelda Wiguna (Indonesia) Rosiana Tendean	7	7
(China) Han Aiping (China) Li Lingwei	15	15

== Mixed doubles ==
=== Finals ===
Semi-finals
(Indonesia) Eddy Hartono (Indonesia) Verawaty Fajrin	15	15
(Indonesia) Hafid Yusuf (Indonesia) Yanti Kusmiati	6	2
(Sweden) Thomas Kihlström (Sweden) Christine Magnusson	4	15	7
(Denmark) Steen Fladberg (England) Gillian Clark	15	8	15

Final
(Indonesia) Eddy Hartono (Indonesia) Verawaty Fajrin	15	17
(Denmark) Steen Fladberg (England) Gillian Clark	8	15
