= Dinuka Karunaratne =

Sri Lankan badminton player

Personal information
- Born: Edirimuni Dinuka Nishan Perera Karunaratne; 6 October 1987 (age 39) Galle, Sri Lanka
- Height: 1.71 m (5 ft 7 in)
- Weight: 69 kg (152 lb)

Sport
- Country: Sri Lanka
- Sport: Badminton
- Handedness: Right

Men's singles & doubles
- Highest ranking: 79 (MS 4 December 2014); 90 / 41 2008 (MD 26 August 2010)
- BWF profile
Medal record
Men's badminton
Representing Sri Lanka
South Asian Games
Silver medal – second place	2006 Colombo	Men's team
Silver medal – second place	2010 Dhaka	Men's team
Silver medal – second place	2019 Kathmandu–Pokhara	Men's team
Bronze medal – third place	2010 Dhaka	Men's singles
Bronze medal – third place	2019 Kathmandu–Pokhara	Men's singles

Edirimuni Dinuka Nishan Perera Karunaratne (Sinhala: දිනුක කරුණාරත්න; Tamil: தினுக கருணாரத்ன; born 6 October 1987) is a Sri Lankan badminton player.

== Personal life ==
His father Louie Karunaratne and brothers Niluka Karunaratne and Diluka Karunaratne also a professional badminton players, while his younger brother Chamika Karunaratne, was a badminton player and now a professional cricketer.

== Career ==
He started playing badminton at aged 7, then in 2004 and 2005 he won the boys' singles and doubles of the Sri Lankan Junior National Badminton Championships. In 2007, he won the Jordan Satellite tournament in men's doubles event partnered with Niluka. In 2008, he won his first national senior title in men's doubles event at the Sri Lankan National Badminton Championships. He also won the Uganda International and became the semi-finalist of the Iran Fajr International tournaments in men's doubles event paired with Diluka Karunaratne.

In 2010, he became the champion of the Sri Lankan National Badminton Championships in men's singles event after defeated his teammate Eranga Fernando. He also participated at the Commonwealth Games in New Delhi, India.

In 2011, he became the semi-finalist of Welsh International tournament in men's singles event. In 2012, he won the Sri Lankan National Badminton Championships in men's doubles event and became the runner-up in men's singles event after beat by his own brother Niluka with scores 21-15, 22-20. In September 2012, he competed at the Brazil International tournament in men's doubles event and finished in third place.

In 2013, he won the Uganda International tournament in men's singles event beat Subhankar Dey of India 21-16, 21-17 in a game that lasted 34 minutes. Subhankar took the lead in the two games, but Dinuka's good game reading and clever net play was enough to win him the title. He also became the runner-up of Bahrain International tournament defeated by Sameer Verma of India.

In 2014, he defended his title in men's singles event at the Uganda International tournament after beating South Africa's Jacob Maliekal 2-0 (21-12, 21-15) in a highly supported game and also became the runner-up of the Bahrain International tournaments after defeated by Subhankar Dey of India 21-19, 13-21, 21-11. He finished third at the Sri Lanka International tournament after losing a match to Anand Pawar of India in three games, 21-12, 15-21, 21-11. He also competed in the men's singles and mixed team events at the Commonwealth Games in Glasgow, Scotland, and defeated by Daren Liew of Malaysia 21-19, 21-12 in round of 16. In the mixed team event, the Sri Lankan national badminton team defeated by England national badminton team 3-0, where he played in mixed doubles event partnered with Thilini Hendahewa lose to English paired Chris and Gabby Adcock 21-13, 21-10. In 2016, he became the champion in the men's doubles event at the Uganda International tournament partnered with Niluka, after beat the Egyptian paired Ali Ahmed El Khateeb and Abdelrahman Kashkal 21-17, 21-17.

In 2018, he made his fourth appearance at the Commonwealth Games, by competing in Gold Coast.

In 2019, he competed at the South Asian Games in Nepal, won the silver medal in the team event, and the bronze medal in the singles event.
