= 1985 Asian Badminton Championships =

Badminton championships

Tournament details
- Dates: 15 – 21 April
- Edition: 7
- Venue: Stadium Negara
- Location: Kuala Lumpur, Malaysia

The Asian Badminton Championships 1985 took place from 15 to 21 April in Kuala Lumpur, Malaysia. Both individual competitions (except Mixed doubles) and men's team competition were conducted. At the end of day, China took titles from three disciplines, Men's singles, Women's singles and Men's team competitions while South Korea won Men's doubles and Women's doubles events.

== Medalists ==
Discipline	Gold	Silver	Bronze
Men's singles	(China) Zhao Jianhua	(China) Yang Yang	(Malaysia) Misbun Sidek
Women's singles	(China) Zheng Yuli	(China) Qian Ping	(China) Shi Wen
Men's doubles	(South Korea) Park Joo-bong (South Korea) Kim Moon-soo	(Malaysia) Razif Sidek (Malaysia) Jalani Sidek	(China) Zhou Jincan (China) Zhang Qiang
Women's doubles	(South Korea) Kim Yun-ja (South Korea) Yoo Sang-hee	(South Korea) Hwang Hye-young (South Korea) Chung So-young	(China) Zheng Yuli (China) Qian Ping
Men's team	China; Zhao Jianhua; Yang Yang; Zhou Jincan; Zhang Qiang	Malaysia; Misbun Sidek; Ong Beng Teong; Razif Sidek; Jalani Sidek	Indonesia; Icuk Sugiarto; Kurniahu; Hendry Saputra; Sigit Pamungkas

== Medal table ==
* Host nation (Malaysia)

Rank	Nation	Gold	Silver	Bronze	Total
1	China	3	2	3	8
2	South Korea	2	1	0	3
3	Malaysia*	0	2	1	3
4	Indonesia	0	0	1	1
Totals (4 entries)		5	5	5	15

== Men's singles ==
Semifinal
(China) Zhao Jianhua	15	15
(Malaysia) Misbun Sidek	7	6
(Indonesia) Icuk Sugiarto	15	14	13
(China) Yang Yang	11	17	15

Final
(China) Zhao Jianhua	15	5	15
(China) Yang Yang	10	15	6
Third place
(Malaysia) Misbun Sidek	9	15	10
(Indonesia) Icuk Sugiarto	15	2	9^{r}

== Women's singles ==
Semifinal
(China) Zheng Yuli	11	11
(South Korea) Yoo Sang-hee	0	1
(China) Shi Wen	12	3	9
(China) Qian Ping	10	11	12

Final
(China) Zheng Yuli	11	12
(China) Qian Ping	6	9
Third place
(South Korea) Yoo Sang-hee
(China) Shi Wen	w	/	o

== Men's doubles ==
Semi-finals
(South Korea) Kim Moon-soo (South Korea) Park Joo-bong	15	15
(Malaysia) Soh Goon Chup (Malaysia) Ho Khim Soon	1	4
(China) Zhang Qiang (China) Zhou Jincan	8	2
(Malaysia) Jalani Sidek (Malaysia) Razif Sidek	15	15

Final
(South Korea) Kim Moon-soo (South Korea) Park Joo-bong	15	8	15
(Malaysia) Jalani Sidek (Malaysia) Razif Sidek	5	15	2
Third place
(Malaysia) Soh Goon Chup (Malaysia) Ho Khim Soon	9	16
(China) Zhang Qiang (China) Zhou Jincan	15	18

== Women's doubles ==
Semi-finals
(South Korea) Hwang Hye-young (South Korea) Chung So-young	4	15	15
(China) Liu Aizhen (China) He Yanling	15	9	10
(China) Qian Ping (China) Zheng Yuli	5	15	10
(South Korea) Yoo Sang-hee (South Korea) Kim Yun-ja	15	9	15

Final
(South Korea) Hwang Hye-young (South Korea) Chung So-young	5	4
(South Korea) Yoo Sang-hee (South Korea) Kim Yun-ja	15	15
Third place
(China) Liu Aizhen (China) He Yanling	12	7
(China) Qian Ping (China) Zheng Yuli	15	15
