= Lucky Dharmasena =

Personal information
- Born: c.1945

Sport
- Country: Sri Lanka
- Sport: Badminton
Medal record
Women's badminton
Representing Sri Lanka
World Masters Games
Gold medal – first place	2002 Melbourne	Women's singles
Silver medal – second place	2002 Melbourne	Women's doubles
Silver medal – second place	2002 Melbourne	Mixed doubles
Asian Championships
Bronze medal – third place	1965 Lucknow	Women's doubles

Lucky Dharmasena also known as Lucky Alagoda (born around 1945) is a Sri Lankan former badminton player. Lucky Dharmasena is a former national badminton champion who is also regarded as one of the greatest female badminton players to have represented the country both at national and international levels.

She was a national champion at the Sri Lankan National Badminton Championships on 6 occasions in the women's singles category (1964, 1965, 1966, 1967, 1968, 1970). She also won the women's doubles at the Badminton National Championships on 4 times in 1965, 1967, 1968 and 1970.

After a prolific badminton career, she went onto coach the Sri Lankan national badminton team from 1982-1988. Especially, she coached the national team at the 1986 Asian Games which was held in Hyderabad.

Lucky then went onto participate at the World Masters Games in 2002 which was held in Melbourne, competing in the over-55 category. She secured the gold medal in the women's badminton singles event and also won the silver medal in the women's doubles event along with her partner Hilda Kreulitch of Austria. Lucky Dharmasena also went onto clinch the silver medal in the mixed doubles event partnering Dhammika Guneratne.

She currently lives in England with her family since 1970.
