= Zhou Jincan =

Chinese badminton player (born 1961)

Zhou Jincan 周金灿
Personal information
- Born: 1961 (age 64–65) Shanghang, Fujian, China
- Years active: 1984-1989
- Height: 174 cm (5 ft 9 in)

Sport
- Country: China
- Sport: Badminton
- Handedness: Right
- Retired: 1989
- Event: Men's doubles and Mixed doubles

Men's doubles and Mixed doubles
- BWF profile
Medal record
Men's badminton
Representing China
World Cup
Bronze medal – third place	1986 Jakarta	Men's doubles
Thomas Cup
Gold medal – first place	1986 Jakarta	Men's team
Gold medal – first place	1988 Kuala Lumpur	Men's team
Asian Championships
Bronze medal – third place	1985 Kuala Lumpur	Men's doubles
Gold medal – first place	1985 Kuala Lumpur	Men's team
Gold medal – first place	1987 Semarang	Men's team

Zhou Jincan (Chinese: 周金灿; born 1961) is a former Chinese badminton player.

== Career ==
Zhou, born in Shanghang also trained in Shanghang youth sports schools and joined the seniors national badminton squad in 1984. Zhou instantly became an established doubles player for China in mid-80s, winning several opens such as Scandinavian Cup in 1984, Hong Kong Open in 1987, and Poona Open in 1989 with his partner Zhang Qiang. Besides men's doubles titles. Zhou also won his hometown China Open mixed doubles title with Lin Ying in 1987 where they swept all five disciplines in that year.

Zhou is a member of 1986 Thomas Cup squad. Zhou and Zhang lost to Indonesian pair of Christian Hadinata and Hadibowo Susanto with the score of 13–15, 8–15 on the straight sets. That loss equalized the whole tie until Li Yongbo and Tian Bingyi managed to seal the deal on the second men's doubles match and bring the championship home. Although not playing a single game in 1988 Thomas Cup, Zhou is also involved in the squad.

== Achievements ==
=== World Cup ===
Men's doubles
Year	Venue	Partner	Opponent	Score	Result
1986	Istora Senayan, Jakarta, Indonesia	(China) Zhang Qiang	(Indonesia) Rudy Heryanto (Indonesia) Hadibowo Susanto	6–15, 15–18	Bronze

=== Asian Championships ===
Men's doubles
Year	Venue	Partner	Opponent	Score	Result
1985	Stadium Negara, Kuala Lumpur, Malaysia	(China) Zhang Qiang	(Malaysia) Soh Goon Chup (Malaysia) Ho Khim Soon	15–9, 18–16	Bronze

=== IBF World Grand Prix ===
The World Badminton Grand Prix was sanctioned by International Badminton Federation (IBF) from 1983 to 2006.

Men's doubles
Year	Tournament	Partner	Opponent	Score	Result
1984	Scandinavian Cup	(China) Zhang Qiang	(Denmark) Mark Christiansen (Denmark) Michael Kjeldsen	17–15, 13–15, 18–15	(gold) Winner
1987	Hong Kong Open	(China) Zhang Qiang	(China) He Xiangyang (China) Tang Hui	15–7, 15–12	(gold) Winner
1987	China Open	(China) Zhang Qiang	(China) Li Yongbo (China) Tian Bingyi	10–15, 6–15	(silver) Runner-up
1987	World Grand Prix Finals	(China) Zhang Qiang	(China) Li Yongbo (China) Tian Bingyi	9–15, 4–15	(silver) Runner-up
1989	Poona Open	(China) Zhang Qiang	(Denmark) Steen Fladberg (Denmark) Jesper Knudsen	15–10, 15–6	(gold) Winner
1989	Swiss Open	(China) Zhang Qiang	(Malaysia) Cheah Soon Kit (Malaysia) Ong Beng Teong	9–15, 15–5, 7–15	(silver) Runner-up

Mixed Doubles
Year	Tournament	Partner	Opponent	Score	Result
1987	China Open	(China) Lin Ying	(China) He Shangquan (China) Xie Yufeng	15–11, 15–1	(gold) Winner
1987	Indonesia Open	(China) Lao Yujing	(Denmark) Jan Paulsen (England) Gillian Gowers	18–14, 9–15, 7–15	(silver) Runner-up

=== Invitation tournament ===
Men's doubles
Year	Tournament	Partner	Opponent	Score	Result
1988	Asian Invitational Championships	(China) Zhang Qiang	(South Korea) Lee Sang-bok (South Korea) Park Joo-bong	18–16, 11–15, 18–16	Gold
1988	Konica Cup	(China) Zhang Qiang	(Japan) Shuji Matsuno (Japan) Shinji Matsuura	5–15, 17–15, 10–15	(silver) Runner-up
