= Zhang Qiang (badminton) =

Chinese badminton player

Zhang Qiang 张强
Personal information
- Born: Fujian, China

Sport
- Country: China
- Sport: Badminton
- Handedness: Right
- Retired: 1989
- Event: Men's doubles

Men's doubles
- BWF profile
Medal record
Men's badminton
Representing China
World Cup
Bronze medal – third place	1986 Jakarta	Men's doubles
Thomas Cup
Gold medal – first place	1986 Jakarta	Men's team
Asian Championships
Bronze medal – third place	1985 Kuala Lumpur	Men's doubles
Gold medal – first place	1985 Kuala Lumpur	Men's team
Gold medal – first place	1987 Semarang	Men's team

Zhang Qiang (Chinese: 张强; born c. 1963) is a former Chinese badminton player.

== Career ==
Zhang first career win in professional badminton came at Polish International in 1983 where he won men's singles and mixed doubles championship with Shi Wen. Besides that tournament, Zhang is also won several opens such as Scandinavian Cup in 1984, Hong Kong Open in 1987, and Poona Open in 1989 with his partner Zhou Jincan.

Zhang is a member of 1986 Thomas Cup squad. Zhang and Zhou lost to Indonesian pair of Christian Hadinata and Hadibowo Susanto with the score of 13–15, 8–15 on the straight sets. That lost equalize the whole tied until Li Yongbo and Tian Bingyi manage to seal the deal on the second men's doubles match and bring the championship home.

== Achievements ==
=== World Cup ===
Men's doubles
Year	Venue	Partner	Opponent	Score	Result
1986	Istora Senayan, Jakarta, Indonesia	(China) Zhou Jincan	(Indonesia) Rudy Heryanto (Indonesia) Hadibowo Susanto	6–15, 15–18	Bronze

=== Asian Championships ===
Men's doubles
Year	Venue	Partner	Opponent	Score	Result
1985	Stadium Negara, Kuala Lumpur, Malaysia	(China) Zhou Jincan	(Malaysia) Soh Goon Chup (Malaysia) Ho Khim Soon	15–9, 18–16	Bronze

=== IBF World Grand Prix ===
The World Badminton Grand Prix was sanctioned by International Badminton Federation (IBF) from 1983 to 2006.

Men's doubles
Year	Tournament	Partner	Opponent	Score	Result
1984	Scandinavian Cup	(China) Zhou Jincan	(Denmark) Mark Christiansen (Denmark) Michael Kjeldsen	17–15, 13–15, 18–15	(gold) Winner
1987	Hong Kong Open	(China) Zhou Jincan	(China) He Xiangyang (China) Tang Hui	15–7, 15–12	(gold) Winner
1987	China Open	(China) Zhou Jincan	(China) Li Yongbo (China) Tian Bingyi	10–15, 6–15	(silver) Runner-up
1987	World Grand Prix Finals	(China) Zhou Jincan	(China) Li Yongbo (China) Tian Bingyi	9–15, 4–15	(silver) Runner-up
1989	Poona Open	(China) Zhou Jincan	(Denmark) Steen Fladberg (Denmark) Jesper Knudsen	15–10, 15–6	(gold) Winner
1989	Swiss Open	(China) Zhou Jincan	(Malaysia) Cheah Soon Kit (Malaysia) Ong Beng Teong	9–15, 15–5, 7–15	(silver) Runner-up

=== IBF International ===
Men's singles
Year	Tournament	Opponent	Score	Result
1983	Polish International	(China) Zheng Zhijun	15–10, 18–17	(gold) Winner

Mixed doubles
Year	Tournament	Partner	Opponent	Score	Result
1983	Polish International	(China) Shi Wen	(China) Wang Jian (China) Liang Ju	17–14, 17–14	(gold) Winner

=== Invitation tournament ===
Men's doubles
Year	Tournament	Partner	Opponent	Score	Result
1988	Asian Invitational Championships	(China) Zhou Jincan	(South Korea) Lee Sang-bok (South Korea) Park Joo-bong	18–16, 11–15, 18–16	Gold
1988	Konica Cup	(China) Zhou Jincan	(Japan) Shuji Matsuno (Japan) Shinji Matsuura	5–15, 17–15, 10–15	(silver) Runner-up
