= 1987 World Badminton Grand Prix Finals =

Tournament details
- Dates: 6–8 January 1988
- Edition: 5
- Total prize money: US$151,050
- Location: Hong Kong

The 1987 World Badminton Grand Prix was the fifth edition of the World Badminton Grand Prix finals. It was held in Hong Kong, from January 6 to January 10, 1988.

== Final results ==
Category	Winners	Score	Runners-up
Men's singles	(China) Xiong Guobao	(Indonesia) Eddy Kurniawan	15–2, 18–14
Women's singles	(China) Li Lingwei	(China) Han Aiping	11–8, 11–5
Men's doubles	(China) Li Yongbo & Tian Bingyi	(China) Zhang Qiang & Zhou Jincan	15–9, 15–4
Women's doubles	(China) Guan Weizhen & Lin Ying	(South Korea) Hwang Hye-young & Chung Myung-hee	15–6, 13–15, 15–4
Mixed doubles	(Sweden) Stefan Karlsson & Maria Bengtsson	(Scotland) Billy Gilliland & (England) Gillian Gowers	15–8, 18–15
