= 1988 Asian Invitational Badminton Championships =

Badminton championships

Tournament details
- Dates: 6 – 10 November
- Edition: 5
- Location: Bandar Lampung, Indonesia

The 1988 Badminton Asia Championships was the unofficial tournament of the Badminton Asia Championships. It was held in Bandar Lampung, Indonesia on 6–10 November 1988. The championships were conducted as Invitational Championships (invitation competition).

== Medalists ==
China won three titles in the men's singles, women's singles and men's doubles, while host country won a title in the women's doubles.

Event	Gold	Silver	Bronze
Men's singles	(China) Xiong Guobao	(Malaysia) Foo Kok Keong	(China) Liu Zhiheng
Men's singles	(China) Xiong Guobao	(Malaysia) Foo Kok Keong	(Indonesia) Ardy Wiranata
Women's singles	(China) Tang Jiuhong	(China) Huang Hua	(Indonesia) Susi Susanti
Women's singles	(China) Tang Jiuhong	(China) Huang Hua	(China) Shi Wen
Men's doubles	(China) Zhang Qiang (China) Zhou Jincan	(South Korea) Lee Sang-bok (South Korea) Park Joo-bong	(Indonesia) Aryono Miranat (Indonesia) Joko Suprianto
Men's doubles	(China) Zhang Qiang (China) Zhou Jincan	(South Korea) Lee Sang-bok (South Korea) Park Joo-bong	(Thailand) Komchan Promsarin (Thailand) Siripong Siripool
Women's doubles	(Indonesia) Verawaty Fajrin (Indonesia) Yanti Kusmiati	(South Korea) Chung Myung-hee (South Korea) Hwang Hye-young	(China) Sun Xiaoqing (China) Zhou Lei
Women's doubles	(Indonesia) Verawaty Fajrin (Indonesia) Yanti Kusmiati	(South Korea) Chung Myung-hee (South Korea) Hwang Hye-young	(South Korea) Lee Heung-soon (South Korea) Lee Young-suk
Mixed doubles	not played		

== Medal table ==
Rank	Nation	Gold	Silver	Bronze	Total
1	China (CHN)	3	1	3	7
2	Indonesia (INA)	1	0	3	4
3	South Korea (KOR)	0	2	1	3
4	Malaysia (MAS)	0	1	0	1
5	Thailand (THA)	0	0	1	1
Totals (5 entries)		4	4	8	16

=== Finals ===
Category	Winners	Runners-up	Score
Men's singles	(China) Xiong Guobao	(Malaysia) Foo Kok Keong	15–9, 15–5
Women's singles	(China) Tang Jiuhong	(China) Huang Hua	11–5, 11–6
Men's doubles	(China) Zhang Qiang (China) Zhou Jincan	(South Korea) Lee Sang-bok (South Korea) Park Joo-bong	18–16, 11–15, 18–16
Women's doubles	(Indonesia) Verawaty Fajrin (Indonesia) Yanti Kusmiati	(South Korea) Chung Myung-hee (South Korea) Hwang Hye-young	18–16, 18–14

=== Semi finals ===
Category	Winner	Runner-up	Score
Men's singles	(China) Xiong Guobao	(Indonesia) Ardy Wiranata	15–6, 15–7
Men's singles	(Malaysia) Foo Kok Keong	(China) Liu Zhiheng	9–15, 15–5, 15–11
Women's singles	(China) Tang Jiuhong	(Indonesia) Susi Susanti	11–1, 11–4
Women's singles	(China) Huang Hua	(China) Shi Wen	11–6, 2–11, 11–4
Men's doubles	(China) Zhang Qiang (China) Zhou Jincan	(Thailand) Komchan Promsarin (Thailand) Siripong Siripool	15–5, 15–1
Men's doubles	(South Korea) Lee Sang-bok (South Korea) Park Joo-bong	(Indonesia) Aryono Miranat (Indonesia) Joko Suprianto	15–8, 15–0
Women's doubles	(South Korea) Chung Myung-hee (South Korea) Hwang Hye-young	(China) Sun Xiaoqing (China) Zhou Lei	11–15, 15–8, 15–5
Women's doubles	(Indonesia) Verawaty Fajrin (Indonesia) Yanti Kusmiati	(South Korea) Lee Heung-soon (South Korea) Lee Young-suk	15–7, 15–2
