= Sri Lankan National Badminton Championships =

Sri Lankan National Badminton Championships are officially held since the year 1953.

== Past winners ==
| Year | No. | Men's singles | Women's singles | Men's doubles | Women's doubles | Mixed doubles |
|---|---|---|---|---|---|---|
| 1953 | 1 | P. Sivalingam | Nanda Nagasinghe | P. Sivalingam; R. P. Nadarajah | Nanda Nagasinghe; L. Nagasinghe | P. Sivalingam; R. Coory |
| 1954 | 2 | Raif Jansz | C. J. Fernando | P. Sivalingam; R. P. Nadarajah | R. Bartholomeus; C. Cheliah | Raif Jansz; R. Bartholomeus |
| 1955 | 3 | N. Rasalingam | R. Bartholomeus | P. Sivalingam; R. P. Nadarajah | R. Bartholomeus; C. J. Fernando | Raif Jansz; R. Bartholomeus |
| 1956 | 4 | Raif Janaz | A. R. L Wijesekera | P. Sivalingam; Raife Jansz | - | A. R. L. Wijesekera; A. R. L. Wijesekera |
| 1957 | 5 | N. Rasalingam | R. Bartholomeus | P. Sivalingam; Raife Jansz | R. Bartholomeus; C. J. Fernando | A. R. L. Wijesekera; A. R. L. Wijesekera |
| 1958 | 6 | Sam Schoorman | A. R. L Wijesekera | V. Veeraraghavan; A. R. L. Wijesekera | A. R. L. Wijesekera; L. Nagasinghe | A. R. L. Wijesekera; A. R. L. Wijesekera |
| 1959 | 7 | Sam Chandrasena | H. Senarathnae | K. Kanagarajah; Raife Jansz | Anthea Perera; Marie Perera | Sam Chandrasena; D. M. Sach |
| 1960 | 8 | N. Rasalingam | Namal de Silva | V. Veeraraghavan; A. R. L. Wijesekera | Anthea Perera; Marie Perera | Sam Chandrasena; Namal de Silva |
| 1961 | 9 | Sam Chandrasena | H. Senarathnae | Sam Chandrasena; V. Sriskandarajah | H. Senaratne; G. de Silva | A. R. L. Wijesekera; A. R. L. Wijesekera |
| 1962 | 10 | N. Rasalingam | H. Senarathnae | Sam Chandrasena; V. Sriskandarajah | H. Senaratne; G. de Silva | Ranjit de Silva; M. Berenger |
| 1963 | 11 | (India) Vasant Kalambi | (India) Sarojini Apte | (India) Amrit Lal Diwan (India) Vasant Kalambi | (India) Sunila Apte (India) Sarojini Apte | (India) Vasant Kalambi (India) Sarojini Apte |
| 1964 | 12 | L. R. Ariyananda | Lucky Dharmasena | G. W. Chandrasena; A. R. L. Wijesekera | - | Ranjit de Silva; Lucky Dharmasena |
| 1965 | 13 | L. R. Ariyananda | Lucky Dharmasena | G. W. Chandrasena; A. R. L. Wijesekera | Lucky Dharmasena; N. Kannangara | Sam Chandrasena; L. Dharmasena |
| 1966 | 14 | Ranjit de Silva | Lucky Dharmasena | G. W. Chandrasena; A. R. L. Wijesekera | Lucky Dharmasena; N. Kannangara | G. W. Chandrasena; H. Molligoda |
| 1967 | 15 | L. R. Ariyananda | Lucky Dharmasena | G. W. Chandrasena; S. Veeravagu | Lucky Dharmasena; H. Moligoda | Tony Dickson; Lucky Dharmasena |
| 1968 | 16 | L. R. Ariyananda | Lucky Dharmasena | G. W. Chandrasena; S. Veeravagu | Lucky Dharmasena; R. Piyasena | Tony Dickson; Lucky Dharmasena |
| 1969 | 17 | L. R. Ariyananda | Shirani Perera | G. W. Chandrasena; S. Veeravagu | N. de Silva; Shirani Perera | Sam Chandrasena; Namal de Silva |
| 1970 | 18 | L. R. Ariyananda | Lucky Alagoda | G. W. Chandrasena; S. Veeravagu | Lucky Alagoda; H. Molligoda | Tony Dickson; Lucky Alagoda |
| 1971 | 19 | L. R. Ariyananda | Chandrika Mallawarachchi | Ranjit de Silva; L. R. Ariyananda | Amitha Silva; Chandrika Mallawarachchi | L. R. Ariyananda; D. G. D. Kusuma |
| 1972 | 20 | K. D. Nallathamby | Chandrika Mallawarachchi | G. W. Chandrasena; S. Veeravagu | Lucky Alagoda; H. Molligoda | Ranjit de Silva; Chandrika Mallawarachchi |
| 1973 | 21 | K. D. Nallathamby | Chandrika Mallawarachchi | G. W.Chandrasena; Lal Anthonis | D. Mallawarachchi; Chandrika Mallawarachchi | A.R.T. de Silva; Chandrika Mallawarachchi |
| 1974 | 22 | A.R.T. de Silva | Chandrika Mallawarachchi | G. W.Chandrasena; Lal Anthonis | D. Mallawarachchi; Chandrika Mallawarachchi | A.R.T. de Silva; Chandrika Mallawarachchi |
| 1975 | 23 | K. D. Nallathamby | Chandrika Mallawarachchi | G. W.Chandrasena; S. Veeravagu | D. Mallawarachchi; Chandrika Mallawarachchi | A.R.T. de Silva; Chandrika Mallawarachchi |
| 1976 | 24 | Ravi Kuruppu | Chandrika Mallawarachchi | L. R. Ariyananda; K. D. Nallatamby | D. Mallawarachchi; Chandrika Mallawarachchi | Ravi Kuruppu; Chandrika Mallawarachchi |
| 1977 | 25 | Ravi Kuruppu | Chandrika Mallawarachchi | L. R. Ariyananda; K. D. Nallatamby | | |
| 1978 | 26 | Ravi Kuruppu | Nimala Wickrsmathilaka | Ravi Kuruppu; Malik Jhan | Kamani Wijesundra; Samanthi Hettiarachchi | K. D. Nallathamby; Sarojini Nadarajah |
| 1979 | 27 | Ravi Kuruppu | Imali Fernando | Ravi Kuruppu; Malik Jhan | | Priyantha Wijesekera; Samanthi Hettiarachchi |
| 1980 | 28 | Ravi Kuruppu | Anoma Wickramanayake | Ravi Kuruppu; Malik Jhan | | |
| 1981 | 29 | Ravi Kuruppu | Anoma Wickramanayake | Ranil Wijesekera; S. Basnayake | Anoma Wickramanayake; Imali Fernando | Niroshan Wijekoon; Kamani Wijesundara |
| 1982 | 30 | Priyantha Wijesekara | Lanthika Madugalla | Niroshan Wijekoon; S. Basnayake | Lucky Alagoda; Samanthi Hettiarachchi | Niroshan Wijekoon; Lucky Alagoda |
| 1983 | 31 | Niroshan Wijekoon | Imali Fernando | Niroshan Wijekoon; S. Basnayake | | Niroshan Wijekoon; Ranjani Senevirathna |
| 1984 | 32 | Niroshan Wijekoon | Rajani Seneviratne | Niroshan Wijekoon; Niranjan Wijesekera | Lucky Alagoda; Imali Fernando | Niroshan Wijekoon; Lucky Alagoda |
| 1985 | 33 | Niroshan Wijekoon | Sriyani Deepika | Niroshan Wijekoon; Udaya Weerakoon | Samanthi Rodrigo; Kaushalya Dissanayake | |
| 1986 | 34 | Niroshan Wijekoon | Yasintha Liyanage | Niroshan Wijekoon; Udaya Weerakoon | | Udaya Weerakoon; Ranjani Senevirathna |
| 1987 | 35 | Niroshan Wijekoon | Sriyani Deepika | Niroshan Wijekoon; Udaya Weerakoon | | Udaya Weerakoon; Sriyani Deepika |
| 1988 | 36 | Udaya Weerakoon | Sriyani Deepika | Niroshan Wijekoon; Udaya Weerakoon | Sriyani Deepika; Kaushalya Dissanayake | Udaya Weerakoon; Sriyani Deepika |
| 1989 | 37 | Niroshan Wijekoon | Kaushalya Dissanayake | Niroshan Wijekoon; Niranjan Wijesekera | Sriyani Deepika; Kaushalya Dissanayake | Duminda Jayakody; Sriyani Deepika |
| 1990 | 38 | Niroshan Wijekoon | Kaushalya Dissanayake | Niroshan Wijekoon; Niranjan Wijesekera | Sriyani Deepika; Kaushalya Dissanayake | Niroshan Wijekoon; Kaushalya Dissanayake |
| 1991 | 39 | Niroshan Wijekoon | Sriyani Deepika | Niroshan Wijekoon; Niranjan Wijesekera | Sriyani Deepika; Kaushalya Dissanayake | Niroshan Wijekoon; Kaushalya Dissanayake |
| 1992 | 40 | Niroshan Wijekoon | Kaushalya Dissanayake | Niroshan Wijekoon; Niranjan Wijesekera | Yasintha Liyanage; Kaushalya Dissanayake | Niroshan Wijekoon; Kaushalya Dissanayake |
| 1993 | 41 | Duminda Jayakody | Kaushalya Dissanayake | Niroshan Wijekoon; Thushara Edirisinghe | Yasintha Liyanage; Kaushalya Dissanayake | Udaya Weerakoon; Sriyani Deepika |
| 1994 | 42 | Thushara Edirisinghe | Kaushalya Dissanayake | Duminda Jayakody; Udaya Weerakoon | Yasintha Liyanage; Kaushalya Dissanayake | Duminda Jayakody; Kaushalya Dissanayake |
| 1995 | 43 | Thushara Edirisinghe | Kaushalya Dissanayake | Palinda Halangoda; Thushara Edirisinghe | Chandrika de Silva; Inoka Rohini de Silva | Duminda Jayakody; Kaushalya Dissanayake |
| 1996 | 44 | Duminda Jayakody | Kaushalya Dissanayake | Palinda Halangoda; Thushara Edirisinghe | Chandrika de Silva; Inoka Rohini de Silva | Duminda Jayakody; Kaushalya Dissanayake |
| 1997 | 45 | Thushara Edirisinghe | Chandrika de Silva | Palinda Halangoda; Thushara Edirisinghe | Kaushalya Disanayake; Sriyani Deepika | Thushara Edirisinghe; Chandrika de Silva |
| 1998 | 46 | Thushara Edirisinghe | Chandrika de Silva | Palinda Halangoda; Thushara Edirisinghe | Chandrika de Silva; Inoka Rohini de Silva | Thushara Edirisinghe; Chandrika de Silva |
| 1999 | 47 | Thushara Edirisinghe | Chandrika de Silva | Duminda Jayakody; Thushara Edirisinghe | Pameesha Dishanthi; Dilhani de Silva | Thushara Edirisinghe; Chandrika de Silva |
| 2000 | 48 | Thushara Edirisinghe | Chandrika de Silva | Duminda Jayakody; Thushara Edirisinghe | Chandrika de Silva; Dilhani de Silva | Duminda Jayakody; Chandrika de Silva |
| 2001 | 49 | Niluka Karunaratne | Chandrika de Silva | Manjula Fernando; Palinda Halangoda | Chandrika de Silva; Dilhani de Silva | Kamal Gamlath; Chandrika de Silva |
| 2002 | 50 | Niluka Karunaratne | Chandrika de Silva | Niluka Karunaratne; Thanuja Liyanage | Chandrika de Silva; Kaushali Rodrigo | Duminda Jayakody; Chandrika de Silva |
| 2003 | 51 | Niluka Karunaratne | Chandrika de Silva | Niluka Karunaratne; Chameera Kumarapperuma | Chandrika de Silva; Pameesha Dishanthi | Thushara Edirisinghe; Chandrika de Silva |
| 2004 | 52 | Niluka Karunaratne | Thilini Jayasinghe | | Chandrika de Silva | |
| 2005 | 53 | Niluka Karunaratne | Chandrika de Silva | | Chandrika de Silva | |
| 2006 | 54 | Niluka Karunaratne | Chandrika de Silva | | Chandrika de Silva | |
| 2007 | 55 | Niluka Karunaratne | Chandrika de Silva | | Chandrika de Silva; Thilini Jayasinghe | Hasitha Chanaka; Thilini Jayasinghe |
| 2008 | 56 | Niluka Karunaratne | Chandrika de Silva | Dinuka Karunaratne; Diluka Karunaratne | Chandrika de Silva; Nadeesha Gayanthi | Niluka Karunaratne; Chandrika de Silva |
| 2009 | 57 | Niluka Karunaratne | Achini Ratnasiri | Rajitha S. Dahanayake; Hasitha Chanaka | Achini Ratnasiri; Upuli Samanthika | Niluka Karunaratne; Chandrika de Silva |
| 2010 | 58 | Dinuka Karunaratne | Achini Ratnasiri | Rathnayakesenaratge Kasun Madushanka; Nuwan Hettiarachchi | Achini Ratnasiri; Upuli Weerasinghe | Lasitha Menaka; Chandrika de Silva |
| 2011 | 59 | Niluka Karunaratne | Achini Ratnasiri | Niluka Karunaratne; Dinuka Karunaratne | Achini Ratnasiri; Upuli Weerasinghe | Niluka Karunaratne; Kavindi Ishadika |
