= Xiong Guobao =

Chinese badminton player (born 1962)

Xiong Guobao 熊国宝
Personal information
- Born: 1 November 1962 (age 64)

Sport
- Country: China
- Sport: Badminton
- Handedness: Right

Men's singles
- Highest ranking: 1
- BWF profile
Medal record
Representing China
Men's badminton
World Cup
Bronze medal – third place	1987 Kuala Lumpur	Men's singles
Bronze medal – third place	1988 Bangkok	Men's singles
Thomas Cup
Gold medal – first place	1986 Jakarta	Men's team
Gold medal – first place	1988 Kuala Lumpur	Men's team
Gold medal – first place	1990 Tokyo	Men's team
Sudirman Cup
Bronze medal – third place	1989 Jakarta	Mixed team
Asian Games
Gold medal – first place	1990 Beijing	Men's team
Silver medal – second place	1986 Seoul	Men's team
Bronze medal – third place	1986 Seoul	Mixed doubles
Asian Championships
Gold medal – first place	1987 Semarang	Men's team
Gold medal – first place	1989 Shanghai	Men's team

Xiong Guobao (born 1 November 1962) is a former elite-level badminton player from China who won numerous international singles titles in the late 1980s.

== Career ==
Noted for his solid, consistent play, Xiong rarely suffered lopsided defeats. His titles included the United States (1984), Japan (1987), Hong Kong (1987), Malaysian (1988, 1989), Thailand (1988), French (1989), Swedish (1988), and Indonesian (1989) Opens. He also won the (now defunct) season ending World Badminton Grand Prix tourney in 1987 and in 1989. Along with fellow singles stars Yang Yang and Zhao Jianhua, Xiong helped China's Thomas Cup (men's international) teams capture consecutive world titles in 1986, 1988, and 1990. His results in IBF World Championships were somewhat disappointing, losing quarterfinal matches to Icuk Sugiarto and Eddy Kurniawan respectively in the 1987 and 1989 editions of the tourney.

== Personal life ==
Xiong married to Qian Ping, his teammates from Jiangxi provincial team in Nanchang in 1991. But after eleven years of marriage, they divorced in 2002.

== Achievements ==
=== World Cup ===
Men's singles
Year	Venue	Opponent	Score	Result
1987	Stadium Negara; Kuala Lumpur, Malaysia	(China) Zhao Jianhua	9–15, 5–15	Bronze
1988	National Stadium; Bangkok, Thailand	(China) Yang Yang	9–15, 15–12, 9–15	Bronze

=== IBF World Grand Prix ===
The World Badminton Grand Prix sanctioned by International Badminton Federation (IBF) from 1983 to 2006.

Men's singles
Year	Tournament	Opponent	Score	Result
1985	Thailand Open	(Indonesia) Icuk Sugiarto	6–15, 3–15	(silver) Runner-up
1987	Japan Open	(China) Zhao Jianhua	12–15, 15–13, 15–10	(gold) Winner
1987	Hong Kong Open	(England) Darren Hall	6–15, 15–4, 15–10	(gold) Winner
1987	China Open	(China) Zhao Jianhua	10–15, 15–8, 6–15	(silver) Runner-up
1987	World Grand Prix Finals	(Indonesia) Eddy Kurniawan	15–2, 18–14	(gold) Winner
1988	German Open	(Denmark) Morten Frost	4–15, 6–15	(silver) Runner-up
1988	Swedish Open	(Sweden) Jens Olsson	15–9, 15–4	(gold) Winner
1988	Thailand Open	(Thailand) Sompol Kukasemkij	18–15, 15–13	(gold) Winner
1988	Malaysia Open	(China) Wu Wenkai	11–15, 15–6, 15–2	(gold) Winner
1988	World Grand Prix Finals	(China) Zhang Qingwu	10–15, 15–4, 8–15	(silver) Runner-up
1989	French Open	(Denmark) Poul-Erik Høyer Larsen	15–7, 15–3	(gold) Winner
1989	Malaysia Open	(China) Zhao Jianhua	15–12, 15–3	(gold) Winner
1989	China Open	(Indonesia) Ardy Wiranata	15–17, 12–15	(silver) Runner-up
1989	Indonesia Open	(Indonesia) Joko Suprianto	15–0, 15–4	(gold) Winner
1989	World Grand Prix Finals	(Malaysia) Foo Kok Keong	15–11, 15–7	(gold) Winner

=== IBF International ===
Men's singles
Year	Tournament	Opponent	Score	Result
1984	U.S. Open	(China) Huang Zhen	15–9, 15–2	(gold) Winner

=== Invitational tournament ===
Men's singles
Year	Tournament	Opponent	Score	Result
1988	Asian Invitational Championships; Bandar Lampung, Indonesia	(Malaysia) Foo Kok Keong	15–9, 15–5	Gold
