= Wong Tat Meng =

Malaysian badminton coach and former player

Personal information
- Born: 1967 (age 58–59)
- Years active: 1986–1992

Sport
- Country: Malaysia
- Sport: Badminton
- Handedness: Right
- Event: Men's singles

Men's singles
- BWF profile
Medal record
Men's badminton
Representing Malaysia
Asian Championships
Bronze medal – third place	1989 Shanghai	Men's team
Southeast Asian Games
Gold medal – first place	1989 Kuala Lumpur	Men's team
Silver medal – second place	1987 Jakarta	Men's team

Wong Tat Meng (born 1967) is a Malaysian badminton coach and former player. He was the independent coach of the top Malaysian men's singles player Lee Zii Jia. He was the coach of the Hong Kong national badminton team before coaching Lee. His coaching has helped Lee to win a bronze medal in the men's singles event at the Olympic Games in 2024.

== Career ==
He is a former men's singles player during the late 1980s to early 1990s.

== Coaching ==
Tat Meng had two stints with the BA of Malaysia from 2003 to 2011 and 2013 to 2016. He also spent two years in Scotland from 2016 to 2018. He also served as a coach in Indonesia, South Korea and Hong Kong.
