= Chan Oi Ni =

Hong Kong badminton player (born 1966)

Chan Oi Ni 陳愛彌
Personal information
- Full name: Emmy Chan Oi Ni
- Born: 15 May 1966 (age 60)

Sport
- Country: Hong Kong
- Sport: Badminton
- Event: Mixed doubles
Medal record
Women's badminton
Representing Hong Kong
World Senior Championships
Bronze medal – third place	2025 Pattaya	Mixed doubles 55+
Commonwealth Games
Bronze medal – third place	1994 Victoria	Mixed team

Chan Oi Ni (Chinese: 陳愛彌; pinyin: Chén àimí; Jyutping: can4 ngoi3 mei4; born 15 May 1966) is a Hong Kong badminton player. She competed in mixed doubles at the 1996 Summer Olympics in Atlanta.

== World Senior Championships ==
Mixed doubles

Year	Age	Venue	Partner	Opponent	Score	Result	Ref
2025	55+	Eastern National Sports Training Centre, Pattaya, Thailand	(Chinese Taipei) Liu En-horng	(Denmark) Bo Sorensen (Denmark) Lene Struwe Andersen	25–27, 15–21	Bronze	
