= Liu En-hung =

Taiwanese badminton player (born 1966)

Liu En-hung 劉恩宏
Personal information
- Born: 16 March 1966 (age 60) Taipei, Taiwan
- Height: 1.73 m (5 ft 8 in)
- Weight: 71 kg (157 lb)

Sport
- Country: Republic of China (Taiwan)
- Sport: Badminton
- Event: Men's singles
Medal record
Men's badminton
Representing Chinese Taipei
World Senior Championships
Gold medal – first place	2015 Helsingborg	Men's doubles 45+
Gold medal – first place	2025 Pattaya	Men's doubles 55+
Silver medal – second place	2015 Helsingborg	Men's singles 45+
Silver medal – second place	2023 Jeonju	Men's singles 55+
Silver medal – second place	2023 Jeonju	Men's doubles 55+
Bronze medal – third place	2025 Pattaya	Mixed doubles 55+
Asian Championships
Bronze medal – third place	1993 Hong Kong	Men's team

Liu En-hung (born 16 March 1966) is a Taiwanese badminton player. He competed in the men's singles tournament at the 1996 Summer Olympics. He is the 2015 Men's doubles world senior champion in 45+ category.

== Achievements ==
=== World Senior Championships ===
Men's singles

Year	Age	Venue	Opponent	Score	Result	Ref
2023	55+	Hwasan Indoor Stadium, Jeonju, South Korea	(India) Rajeev Sharma	21–15, 20–22, 13–21	Silver	

Men's doubles

Year	Age	Venue	Partner	Opponent	Score	Result	Ref
2023	55+	Hwasan Indoor Stadium, Jeonju, South Korea	(Chinese Taipei) Tu Tung-sheng	(England) Jon Austin (England) Rajeev Bagga	16–21, 21–19, 17–21	Silver	
2025	55+	Eastern National Sports Training Centre, Pattaya, Thailand	(Chinese Taipei) Tu Tung-sheng	(Thailand) Chatchai Boonmee (Thailand) Karun Kasayapanant	21–17, 21–13	Gold	

Mixed doubles

Year	Age	Venue	Partner	Opponent	Score	Result	Ref
2025	55+	Eastern National Sports Training Centre, Pattaya, Thailand	(Hong Kong) Chan Oi Ni	(Denmark) Bo Sorensen (Denmark) Lene Struwe Andersen	25–27, 15–21	Bronze	
