= Kwan Yoke Meng =

Malaysian badminton player

Kwan Yoke Meng 关义明
Personal information
- Born: 11 January 1966 (age 60) Kuala Lumpur, Malaysia
- Years active: 1984-1993
- Height: 1.75 m (5 ft 9 in)

Sport
- Country: Malaysia
- Sport: Badminton
- Handedness: Right
- Event: Men's singles

Men's singles
- BWF profile
Medal record
Representing Malaysia
Men's badminton
Thomas Cup
Gold medal – first place	1992 Kuala Lumpur	Team
Silver medal – second place	1990 Tokyo	Team
Asian Games
Silver medal – second place	1990 Beijing	Men's team
Asian Championships
Bronze medal – third place	1989 Shanghai	Men's team
Southeast Asian Games
Gold medal – first place	1991 Manila	Men's team
Silver medal – second place	1987 Jakarta	Men's team

Kwan Yoke Meng KMN (born 11 January 1966) is a former badminton player and coach from Malaysia.

== Achievement ==
=== IBF World Grand Prix ===
The World Badminton Grand Prix sanctioned by International Badminton Federation (IBF) from 1983 to 2006.

Men's singles
Year	Tournament	Opponent	Score	Result
1988	Swiss Open	(Scotland) Kenny Middlemiss	walkover	(gold) Winner

== Honour ==
- Malaysia:
  - Officer of the Order of the Defender of the Realm (K.M.N.) (1992)
