= Shi Wen =

Chinese badminton player (born 1963)

Shi Wen 施文
Personal information
- Born: 1963 (age 62–63) Fuzhou, Fujian, China
- Years active: 1983–1989

Sport
- Country: China
- Sport: Badminton
- Handedness: Right
- Retired: 1989
- Event: Women's singles & doubles

Women's singles & doubles
- BWF profile
Medal record
Women's badminton
Representing China
Uber Cup
Gold medal – first place	1988 Kuala Lumpur	Women's team
Asian Championships
Bronze medal – third place	1985 Kuala Lumpur	Women's singles

Shi Wen (Chinese: 施文, born 1963) is a Chinese former badminton player.

== Career ==
Shi was born in 1963, in Fuzhou. She was an alumni from Taijiang no. 5 Central Primary School and being selected as senior member playing team in 1979.

She was transferred into the main training squad in 1983, when Shi made an instant impact by won the Polish Open in women's singles, women's doubles, and mixed doubles. Shi won the bronze in Asian Championships in 1985 with the walkout against Korean Yoo Sang-hee. In 1986, she won the Malaysia Open and also Indonesia Open in women's singles. Her biggest achievement is when she was a part of the 1988 Uber Cup squad that won the title for the three straight years. Although she was mainly a women's singles player, she played a keyrole in women's doubles in that year Uber Cup, winning 2 group stage matches and the semifinal game against Indonesia. She retired in 1989.

== Achievements ==
=== Asian Championships ===
Women's singles

Year	Venue	Opponent	Score	Result
1985	Stadium Negara, Kuala Lumpur, Malaysia	(South Korea) Yoo Sang-hee	walkover	Bronze

=== IBF World Grand Prix ===
The World Badminton Grand Prix was sanctioned by International Badminton Federation (IBF) from 1983 to 2006.

Women's singles

Year	Tournament	Opponent	Score	Result
1986	Malaysia Open	(China) Wu Jianqiu	7–11, 12–10, 11–9	(gold) Winner
1986	Indonesia Open	(England) Helen Troke	6–11, 11–9, 11–9	(gold) Winner
1987	Indonesia Open	(China) Li Lingwei	10–12, 6–11	(silver) Runner-up

Women's doubles

Year	Tournament	Partner	Opponent	Score	Result
1988	Thailand Open	(China) Luo Yun	(South Korea) Chung Myung-hee (South Korea) Hwang Hye-young	7–15, 16–17	(silver) Runner-up

=== IBF International ===
Women's singles

Year	Tournament	Opponent	Score	Result
1983	Polish International	(China) Chen Guirong	12–10, 11–1	(gold) Winner

Women's doubles

Year	Tournament	Partner	Opponent	Score	Result
1983	Polish International	(China) Chen Guirong	(China) Chu Xiaojin (China) Liang Ju	15–7, 15–5	(gold) Winner

Mixed doubles

Year	Tournament	Partner	Opponent	Score	Result
1983	Polish International	(China) Zhang Qiang	(China) Wang Jian (China) Liang Ju	17–14, 17–14	(gold) Winner

=== Invitation tournament ===
Women's singles

Year	Tournament	Venue	Opponent	Score	Result
1988	Asian Invitational Championships	Bandar Lampung, Indonesia	(China) Huang Hua	6–11, 11–2, 4–11	Bronze

Women's doubles

Year	Tournament	Partner	Opponent	Score	Result
1988	Konica Cup	(China) Zhou Lei	(China) Huang Hua (China) Tang Jiuhong	15–10, 15–12	(gold) Winner
