= Niroshan Wijekoon =

Sri Lankan badminton player

Personal information
- Born: Pathmasiri Niroshan Bandara Wijekoon; 10 February 1964 (age 62)
- Years active: 1975–2007

Sport
- Country: Sri Lanka
- Sport: Badminton
- Handedness: Right

Men's singles and doubles
- Career record: 22 wins, 41 losses
- BWF profile

Pathmasiri Niroshan Bandara Wijekoon (born 10 February 1964) is a Sri Lankan badminton player. He is the first badminton player to represent Sri Lanka at the Olympic Games. Wijekoon held the Sri Lankan National Badminton Championships singles title for nine years (1983–1987 and 1989–1992).

== Family and early life ==
Wijekoon is the son of former Minister, MP, Ambassador and Presidential Candidate Ukku Banda Wijekoon. Wijekoon had his education at St. Thomas' College, Bandarawela and Royal College, Colombo.

== Career ==
Wijekoon made his debut at the Sri Lankan National Badminton Championships in 1975 as an 11-year-old and went on to win 28 titles; 9 singles, 12 doubles and 7 mixed doubles. He won his first singles title in 1983. Wijekoon has represented Sri Lanka at three Asian Games and two Commonwealth Games.

In 1984, he beat Singaporean no. 1 at the Thomas Cup and was the first Sri Lankan to win a singles match in a Thomas Cup game. In 1992, Wijekoon beat the Indian No. 1 at the Portugal Open.

Wijekoon competed at the 1992 Summer Olympics in the men's singles. He lost in the first round to Hannes Fuchs, of Austria, 15–9, 15–11. In his home country he won several national championships. He also participated the World Badminton Championships in 1989 in the men's singles losing to Kim Hak-kyun of South Korea 7:15 and 7:15. In his home country, he won nine titles in the men's singles at the Sri Lankan National Badminton Championships between 1983 and 1992.

== Retirement and later years ==
Although the grace of the younger days are fading Wijekoon has no thoughts of hanging the boots. Even now, as Director of the stock brokering firm Asia Securities he still plays in Sri Lankan National Badminton Championships, making his 32nd appearance in 2007.

At the age of 38, unseeded Wijekoon beat the bottom seeded Udaya Wanigasinghe to make a long due singles quarter finals berth. In 2007, at the age of 43, he stretched as far as the semi-finals in doubles, beating the second seed on the way.

== Achievements ==
=== IBF International ===
Men's singles

Year	Tournament	Opponent	Score	Result
1992	Portugal International	(Russia) Andrey Antropov	8–15, 5–15	(silver) Runner-up
