= 1964 Thomas Cup squads =

This article lists the squads for the 1964 Thomas Cup participating teams. The age listed for each player is on 14 May 1964 which was the first day of the tournament.

== Teams ==
=== Denmark ===
Six players represented Denmark in the 1964 Thomas Cup.

Name	DoB/Age
Finn Kobberø	13 March 1936 (aged 28)
Jørgen Hammergaard Hansen	1930 (aged 33–34)
Erland Kops	14 January 1937 (aged 27)
Poul-Erik Nielsen	10 April 1931 (aged 33)
Knud Aage Nielsen	1 March 1937 (aged 27)
Henning Borch	9 March 1938 (aged 26)

=== Indonesia ===
Nine players represented Indonesia in the 1964 Thomas Cup.

Name	DoB/Age
Tan Joe Hok	11 August 1937 (aged 26)
Ferry Sonneville	3 January 1931 (aged 33)
Eddy Yusuf	3 April 1931 (aged 33)
Tan King Gwan	1932 (aged 31–32)
Ang Tjin Siang	11 September 1942 (aged 21)
Wong Pek Sen	1945 (aged 18–19)
Liem Tjeng Kiang	1935 (aged 28–29)
Abdul Patah Unang	1937 (aged 26–27)
Tutang Djamaluddin	1935 (aged 28–29)

=== Japan ===
Five players represented Japan in the 1964 Thomas Cup.

Name	DoB/Age
Yoshio Komiya	1940 (aged 23–24)
Takeshi Miyanaga	1940 (aged 23–24)
Yoshinori Itagaki	1942 (aged 21–22)
Eiichi Nagai	1938 (aged 25–26)
Eiichi Sakai	1939 (aged 24–25)

=== Malaysia ===
Eight players represented Malaysia in the 1964 Thomas Cup.

Name	DoB/Age
Teh Kew San	26 January 1935 (aged 29)
Yew Cheng Hoe	1943 (aged 20–21)
Tan Aik Huang	14 February 1946 (aged 18)
Billy Ng	1940 (aged 23–24)
Ng Boon Bee	17 December 1937 (aged 26)
Tan Yee Khan	24 September 1940 (aged 23)
George Yap	1937 (aged 26–27)
Lim Say Hup	1935 (aged 28–29)

=== Thailand ===
Seven players represented Thailand in the 1964 Thomas Cup.

Name	DoB/Age
Channarong Ratanaseangsuang	1939 (aged 24–25)
Charoen Wattanasin	4 April 1937 (aged 27)
Narong Bhornchima	1938 (aged 25–26)
Raphi Kanchanaraphi	6 November 1936 (aged 27)
Chavalert Chumkum	14 September 1939 (aged 24)
Chuchart Vatanatham	1937 (aged 26–27)
Sangob Rattanusorn	1943 (aged 20–21)
