= Medalists at the Badminton Asia Championships – Men's doubles =

Badminton championships

Badminton Asia Championships Men's Doubles Champions
- Governing body: Badminton Asia
- Created: 1962; 64 years ago
- Editions: 40
- Website: https://badmintonasia.org/

Most titles
- 4: (South Korea) Lee Yong-dae

Current champion
- (South Korea) Kim Won-ho (South Korea) Seo Seung-jae (2026)

The Asian Badminton Championships is a tournament organized by the Badminton Asia Confederation to crown the best badminton players in Asia. There were two championships in 1976, one of them was unofficial/invitational. Further editions of Invitation Asian championships were held in 1977, 1978 and 1988. Below is the list of the men's doubles medalists at the Badminton Asia Championships since 1962.

| Year | Host City | Gold | Silver | Bronze |
|---|---|---|---|---|
| 1962 | Kuala Lumpur | (Federation of Malaya) Ng Boon Bee (Federation of Malaya) Tan Yee Khan | (Federation of Malaya) Lim Say Hup (Federation of Malaya) Teh Kew San | (Thailand) Sanguan Anandhanonda (Thailand) Sangob Rattanusorn |
| 1962 | Kuala Lumpur | (Federation of Malaya) Ng Boon Bee (Federation of Malaya) Tan Yee Khan | (Federation of Malaya) Lim Say Hup (Federation of Malaya) Teh Kew San | (Indonesia) Liem Tjeng Kiang (Indonesia) Tjap Han Tiong |
| 1965 | Lucknow | (Thailand) Narong Bhornchima (Thailand) Chavalert Chumkum | (Thailand) Temshakdi Mahakonok (Malaysia) Tan Yee Khan | (Hong Kong) Koo Man For (Hong Kong) Wong Fai Hung |
| 1965 | Lucknow | (Thailand) Narong Bhornchima (Thailand) Chavalert Chumkum | (Thailand) Temshakdi Mahakonok (Malaysia) Tan Yee Khan | (Thailand) Sangob Rattanusorn (Thailand) Tuly Ulao |
| 1969 | Manila | (Malaysia) Punch Gunalan (Malaysia) Ng Boon Bee | (Japan) Yukinori Hori (Japan) Ippei Kojima | (Thailand) Chavalert Chumkum (Thailand) Sangob Rattanusorn |
| 1969 | Manila | (Malaysia) Punch Gunalan (Malaysia) Ng Boon Bee | (Japan) Yukinori Hori (Japan) Ippei Kojima | (Philippines) Sy Khim Piao (Philippines) Armando Yanga |
| 1971 | Jakarta | (Indonesia) Indra Gunawan (Indonesia) Nara Sudjana | (Indonesia) Tata Budiman (Indonesia) Tjun Tjun | (Indonesia) Ade Chandra (Indonesia) Christian Hadinata |
| 1976 | Hyderabad | (Indonesia) Ade Chandra (Indonesia) Tjun Tjun | (China) Sun Zhian (China) Yao Ximing | (Thailand) Jiamsak Panitchaikul (Thailand) Surapong Suharitdamrong |
| 1976 | Hyderabad | (Indonesia) Ade Chandra (Indonesia) Tjun Tjun | (China) Sun Zhian (China) Yao Ximing | (Japan) Shoichi Toganoo (Japan) Nobutaka Ikeda |
| 1983 | Calcutta | (China) He Shangquan (China) Jiang Guoliang | (South Korea) Sung Han-kook (South Korea) Yoo Byung-hwan | (Indonesia) Hadibowo (Indonesia) Hafid Yusuf |
| 1983 | Calcutta | (China) He Shangquan (China) Jiang Guoliang | (South Korea) Sung Han-kook (South Korea) Yoo Byung-hwan | (China) Sun Zhian (China) Zhao Jianhua |
| 1985 | Kuala Lumpur | (South Korea) Kim Moon-soo (South Korea) Park Joo-bong | (Malaysia) Jalani Sidek (Malaysia) Razif Sidek | (China) Zhang Qiang (China) Zhou Jincan |
| 1991 | Kuala Lumpur | (South Korea) Kim Moon-soo (South Korea) Park Joo-bong | (China) Chen Hongyong (China) Chen Kang | (Malaysia) Cheah Soon Kit (Malaysia) Soo Beng Kiang |
| 1991 | Kuala Lumpur | (South Korea) Kim Moon-soo (South Korea) Park Joo-bong | (China) Chen Hongyong (China) Chen Kang | (Indonesia) Richard Mainaky (Indonesia) Ricky Subagja |
| 1992 | Kuala Lumpur | (Malaysia) Jalani Sidek (Malaysia) Razif Sidek | (China) Huang Zhanzhong (China) Zheng Yumin | (Chinese Taipei) Ger Shin-ming (Chinese Taipei) Yang Shih-jeng |
| 1992 | Kuala Lumpur | (Malaysia) Jalani Sidek (Malaysia) Razif Sidek | (China) Huang Zhanzhong (China) Zheng Yumin | (Malaysia) Ong Ewe Chye (Malaysia) Rahman Sidek |
| 1994 | Shanghai | (China) Chen Hongyong (China) Chen Kang | (Malaysia) Tan Kim Her (Malaysia) Yap Kim Hock | (China) Huang Zhanzhong (China) Jiang Xin |
| 1994 | Shanghai | (China) Chen Hongyong (China) Chen Kang | (Malaysia) Tan Kim Her (Malaysia) Yap Kim Hock | (Malaysia) Jalani Sidek (Malaysia) Razif Sidek |
| 1995 | Beijing | (Malaysia) Cheah Soon Kit (Malaysia) Yap Kim Hock | (China) Huang Zhanzhong (China) Jiang Xin | (Indonesia) Ade Sutrisna (Indonesia) Candra Wijaya |
| 1995 | Beijing | (Malaysia) Cheah Soon Kit (Malaysia) Yap Kim Hock | (China) Huang Zhanzhong (China) Jiang Xin | (Thailand) Pramote Teerawiwatana (Thailand) Sakrapee Thongsari |
| 1996 | Surabaya | (Indonesia) Ade Sutrisna (Indonesia) Candra Wijaya | (South Korea) Ha Tae-kwon (South Korea) Kang Kyung-jin | (Indonesia) Sigit Budiarto (Indonesia) Dicky Purwotjugiono |
| 1996 | Surabaya | (Indonesia) Ade Sutrisna (Indonesia) Candra Wijaya | (South Korea) Ha Tae-kwon (South Korea) Kang Kyung-jin | (Indonesia) Cun Cun Haryono (Indonesia) Ade Lukas |
| 1997 | Kuala Lumpur | (Indonesia) Antonius Ariantho (Indonesia) Denny Kantono | (Malaysia) Choong Tan Fook (Malaysia) Lee Wan Wah | (Malaysia) Chew Choon Eng (Malaysia) Lee Chee Leong |
| 1997 | Kuala Lumpur | (Indonesia) Antonius Ariantho (Indonesia) Denny Kantono | (Malaysia) Choong Tan Fook (Malaysia) Lee Wan Wah | (Indonesia) Eng Hian (Indonesia) Hermono Yuwono |
| 1998 | Bangkok | (South Korea) Ha Tae-kwon (South Korea) Kang Kyung-jin | (China) Zhang Jun (China) Zhang Wei | (Indonesia) Tony Gunawan (Indonesia) Halim Haryanto |
| 1998 | Bangkok | (South Korea) Ha Tae-kwon (South Korea) Kang Kyung-jin | (China) Zhang Jun (China) Zhang Wei | (Indonesia) Eng Hian (Indonesia) Flandy Limpele |
| 1999 | Kuala Lumpur | (South Korea) Ha Tae-kwon (South Korea) Kim Dong-moon | (China) Zhang Jun (China) Zhang Wei | (Malaysia) Cheah Soon Kit (Malaysia) Yap Kim Hock |
| 1999 | Kuala Lumpur | (South Korea) Ha Tae-kwon (South Korea) Kim Dong-moon | (China) Zhang Jun (China) Zhang Wei | (Thailand) Tesana Panvisvas (Thailand) Pramote Teerawiwatana |
| 2000 | Jakarta | (Indonesia) Tony Gunawan (Indonesia) Rexy Mainaky | (Malaysia) Choong Tan Fook (Malaysia) Lee Wan Wah | (Indonesia) Antonius Ariantho (Indonesia) Candra Wijaya |
| 2000 | Jakarta | (Indonesia) Tony Gunawan (Indonesia) Rexy Mainaky | (Malaysia) Choong Tan Fook (Malaysia) Lee Wan Wah | (Indonesia) Luluk Hadiyanto (Indonesia) Imam Sodikin |
| 2001 | Manila | (Indonesia) Tri Kusharjanto (Indonesia) Bambang Suprianto | (Indonesia) Tony Gunawan (Indonesia) Candra Wijaya | (China) Cheng Rui (China) Wang Wei |
| 2001 | Manila | (Indonesia) Tri Kusharjanto (Indonesia) Bambang Suprianto | (Indonesia) Tony Gunawan (Indonesia) Candra Wijaya | (Indonesia) Hendra Aprida Gunawan (Indonesia) Alvent Yulianto |
| 2002 | Bangkok | (South Korea) Ha Tae-kwon (South Korea) Kim Dong-moon | (Indonesia) Sigit Budiarto (Indonesia) Candra Wijaya | (Indonesia) Halim Haryanto (Indonesia) Tri Kusharjanto |
| 2002 | Bangkok | (South Korea) Ha Tae-kwon (South Korea) Kim Dong-moon | (Indonesia) Sigit Budiarto (Indonesia) Candra Wijaya | (Thailand) Tesana Panvisvas (Thailand) Pramote Teerawiwatana |
| 2003 | Jakarta | (South Korea) Lee Dong-soo (South Korea) Yoo Yong-sung | (Indonesia) Markis Kido (Indonesia) Hendra Setiawan | (Indonesia) Luluk Hadiyanto (Indonesia) Alvent Yulianto |
| 2003 | Jakarta | (South Korea) Lee Dong-soo (South Korea) Yoo Yong-sung | (Indonesia) Markis Kido (Indonesia) Hendra Setiawan | (Indonesia) Eng Hian (Indonesia) Flandy Limpele |
| 2004 | Kuala Lumpur | (Indonesia) Sigit Budiarto (Indonesia) Tri Kusharjanto | (Indonesia) Halim Haryanto (Indonesia) Candra Wijaya | (Malaysia) Chan Chong Ming (Malaysia) Chew Choon Eng |
| 2004 | Kuala Lumpur | (Indonesia) Sigit Budiarto (Indonesia) Tri Kusharjanto | (Indonesia) Halim Haryanto (Indonesia) Candra Wijaya | (Indonesia) Eng Hian (Indonesia) Flandy Limpele |
| 2005 | Hyderabad | (Indonesia) Markis Kido (Indonesia) Hendra Setiawan | (South Korea) Jung Jae-sung (South Korea) Lee Jae-jin | (Indonesia) Hendra Aprida Gunawan (Indonesia) Joko Riyadi |
| 2005 | Hyderabad | (Indonesia) Markis Kido (Indonesia) Hendra Setiawan | (South Korea) Jung Jae-sung (South Korea) Lee Jae-jin | (Malaysia) Ong Soon Hock (Malaysia) Tan Bin Shen |
| 2006 | Johor Bahru | (Malaysia) Choong Tan Fook (Malaysia) Lee Wan Wah | (Malaysia) Hoon Thien How (Malaysia) Tan Boon Heong | (Indonesia) Luluk Hadiyanto (Indonesia) Alvent Yulianto |
| 2006 | Johor Bahru | (Malaysia) Choong Tan Fook (Malaysia) Lee Wan Wah | (Malaysia) Hoon Thien How (Malaysia) Tan Boon Heong | (South Korea) Hwang Ji-man (South Korea) Jung Tae-keuk |
| 2007 | Johor Bahru | (Malaysia) Choong Tan Fook (Malaysia) Lee Wan Wah | (Malaysia) Koo Kien Keat (Malaysia) Tan Boon Heong | (Malaysia) Mohd Zakry Abdul Latif (Malaysia) Mohd Fairuzizuan Mohd Tazari |
| 2007 | Johor Bahru | (Malaysia) Choong Tan Fook (Malaysia) Lee Wan Wah | (Malaysia) Koo Kien Keat (Malaysia) Tan Boon Heong | (Chinese Taipei) Hu Chung-shien (Chinese Taipei) Tsai Chia-hsin |
| 2008 | Johor Bahru | (South Korea) Jung Jae-sung (South Korea) Lee Yong-dae | (Indonesia) Nova Widianto (Indonesia) Candra Wijaya | (South Korea) Hwang Ji-man (South Korea) Lee Jae-jin |
| 2008 | Johor Bahru | (South Korea) Jung Jae-sung (South Korea) Lee Yong-dae | (Indonesia) Nova Widianto (Indonesia) Candra Wijaya | (Malaysia) Koo Kien Keat (Malaysia) Tan Boon Heong |
| 2009 | Suwon | (Indonesia) Markis Kido (Indonesia) Hendra Setiawan | (South Korea) Ko Sung-hyun (South Korea) Yoo Yeon-seong | (China) Chai Biao (China) Liu Xiaolong |
| 2009 | Suwon | (Indonesia) Markis Kido (Indonesia) Hendra Setiawan | (South Korea) Ko Sung-hyun (South Korea) Yoo Yeon-seong | (South Korea) Han Sang-hoon (South Korea) Hwang Ji-man |
| 2010 | New Delhi | (South Korea) Cho Gun-woo (South Korea) Yoo Yeon-seong | (Chinese Taipei) Chen Hung-ling (Chinese Taipei) Lin Yu-lang | (Chinese Taipei) Fang Chieh-min (Chinese Taipei) Lee Sheng-mu |
| 2010 | New Delhi | (South Korea) Cho Gun-woo (South Korea) Yoo Yeon-seong | (Chinese Taipei) Chen Hung-ling (Chinese Taipei) Lin Yu-lang | (South Korea) Han Sang-hoon (South Korea) Hwang Ji-man |
| 2011 | Chengdu | (China) Cai Yun (China) Fu Haifeng | (Japan) Hirokatsu Hashimoto (Japan) Noriyasu Hirata | (China) Chai Biao (China) Guo Zhendong |
| 2011 | Chengdu | (China) Cai Yun (China) Fu Haifeng | (Japan) Hirokatsu Hashimoto (Japan) Noriyasu Hirata | (China) Xu Chen (China) Zhang Nan |
| 2012 | Qingdao | (South Korea) Kim Gi-jung (South Korea) Kim Sa-rang | (Japan) Hiroyuki Endo (Japan) Kenichi Hayakawa | (China) Chai Biao (China) Guo Zhendong |
| 2012 | Qingdao | (South Korea) Kim Gi-jung (South Korea) Kim Sa-rang | (Japan) Hiroyuki Endo (Japan) Kenichi Hayakawa | (China) Hong Wei (China) Shen Ye |
| 2013 | Taipei | (South Korea) Ko Sung-hyun (South Korea) Lee Yong-dae | (South Korea) Kim Gi-jung (South Korea) Kim Sa-rang | (Malaysia) Goh V Shem (Malaysia) Lim Khim Wah |
| 2013 | Taipei | (South Korea) Ko Sung-hyun (South Korea) Lee Yong-dae | (South Korea) Kim Gi-jung (South Korea) Kim Sa-rang | (Japan) Hiroyuki Endo (Japan) Kenichi Hayakawa |
| 2014 | Gimcheon | (South Korea) Shin Baek-cheol (South Korea) Yoo Yeon-seong | (China) Li Junhui (China) Liu Yuchen | (China) Chen Zhuofu (China) Shi Longfei |
| 2014 | Gimcheon | (South Korea) Shin Baek-cheol (South Korea) Yoo Yeon-seong | (China) Li Junhui (China) Liu Yuchen | (Thailand) Maneepong Jongjit (Thailand) Nipitphon Puangpuapech |
| 2015 | Wuhan | (South Korea) Lee Yong-dae (South Korea) Yoo Yeon-seong | (Indonesia) Mohammad Ahsan (Indonesia) Hendra Setiawan | (China) Cai Yun (China) Lu Kai |
| 2015 | Wuhan | (South Korea) Lee Yong-dae (South Korea) Yoo Yeon-seong | (Indonesia) Mohammad Ahsan (Indonesia) Hendra Setiawan | (South Korea) Kim Gi-jung (South Korea) Kim Sa-rang |
| 2016 | Wuhan | (South Korea) Lee Yong-dae (South Korea) Yoo Yeon-seong | (China) Li Junhui (China) Liu Yuchen | (China) Fu Haifeng (China) Zhang Nan |
| 2016 | Wuhan | (South Korea) Lee Yong-dae (South Korea) Yoo Yeon-seong | (China) Li Junhui (China) Liu Yuchen | (Japan) Takeshi Kamura (Japan) Keigo Sonoda |
| 2017 | Wuhan | (China) Li Junhui (China) Liu Yuchen | (China) Huang Kaixiang (China) Wang Yilyu | (China) Chai Biao (China) Hong Wei |
| 2017 | Wuhan | (China) Li Junhui (China) Liu Yuchen | (China) Huang Kaixiang (China) Wang Yilyu | (Japan) Takeshi Kamura (Japan) Keigo Sonoda |
| 2018 | Wuhan | (China) Li Junhui (China) Liu Yuchen | (Japan) Takeshi Kamura (Japan) Keigo Sonoda | (China) Huang Kaixiang (China) Wang Yilyu |
| 2018 | Wuhan | (China) Li Junhui (China) Liu Yuchen | (Japan) Takeshi Kamura (Japan) Keigo Sonoda | (China) Liu Cheng (China) Zhang Nan |
| 2019 | Wuhan | (Japan) Hiroyuki Endo (Japan) Yuta Watanabe | (Indonesia) Marcus Fernaldi Gideon (Indonesia) Kevin Sanjaya Sukamuljo | (Japan) Takeshi Kamura (Japan) Keigo Sonoda |
| 2019 | Wuhan | (Japan) Hiroyuki Endo (Japan) Yuta Watanabe | (Indonesia) Marcus Fernaldi Gideon (Indonesia) Kevin Sanjaya Sukamuljo | (South Korea) Kang Min-hyuk (South Korea) Kim Won-ho |
| 2022 | Manila | (Indonesia) Pramudya Kusumawardana (Indonesia) Yeremia Rambitan | (Malaysia) Aaron Chia (Malaysia) Soh Wooi Yik | (Malaysia) Goh Sze Fei (Malaysia) Nur Izzuddin |
| 2022 | Manila | (Indonesia) Pramudya Kusumawardana (Indonesia) Yeremia Rambitan | (Malaysia) Aaron Chia (Malaysia) Soh Wooi Yik | (Indonesia) Fajar Alfian (Indonesia) Muhammad Rian Ardianto |
| 2023 | Dubai | (India) Satwiksairaj Rankireddy (India) Chirag Shetty | (Malaysia) Ong Yew Sin (Malaysia) Teo Ee Yi | (Japan) Takuro Hoki (Japan) Yugo Kobayashi |
| 2023 | Dubai | (India) Satwiksairaj Rankireddy (India) Chirag Shetty | (Malaysia) Ong Yew Sin (Malaysia) Teo Ee Yi | (Chinese Taipei) Lee Yang (Chinese Taipei) Wang Chi-lin |
| 2024 | Ningbo | (China) Liang Weikeng (China) Wang Chang | (Malaysia) Goh Sze Fei (Malaysia) Nur Izzuddin | (Chinese Taipei) Lee Jhe-huei (Chinese Taipei) Yang Po-hsuan |
| 2024 | Ningbo | (China) Liang Weikeng (China) Wang Chang | (Malaysia) Goh Sze Fei (Malaysia) Nur Izzuddin | (Malaysia) Aaron Chia (Malaysia) Soh Wooi Yik |
| 2025 | Ningbo | (Malaysia) Aaron Chia (Malaysia) Soh Wooi Yik | (China) Chen Boyang (China) Liu Yi | (Indonesia) Leo Rolly Carnando (Indonesia) Bagas Maulana |
| 2025 | Ningbo | (Malaysia) Aaron Chia (Malaysia) Soh Wooi Yik | (China) Chen Boyang (China) Liu Yi | (China) Liang Weikeng (China) Wang Chang |
| 2026 | Ningbo | (South Korea) Kim Won-ho (South Korea) Seo Seung-jae | (South Korea) Kang Min-hyuk (South Korea) Ki Dong-ju | (China) He Jiting (China) Ren Xiangyu |
| 2026 | Ningbo | (South Korea) Kim Won-ho (South Korea) Seo Seung-jae | (South Korea) Kang Min-hyuk (South Korea) Ki Dong-ju | (Indonesia) Fajar Alfian (Indonesia) Muhammad Shohibul Fikri |

== Medal table ==
*Accurate as of 2026 Badminton Asia Championships.

| Rank | Nation | Gold | Silver | Bronze | Total |
|---|---|---|---|---|---|
| 1 | South Korea | 14 | 6 | 6 | 26 |
| 2 | Indonesia | 10 | 8 | 22 | 40 |
| 3 | Malaysia | 7 | 10.5 | 12 | 29.5 |
| 4 | China | 6 | 10 | 17 | 33 |
| 5 | Japan | 1 | 4 | 6 | 11 |
| 6 | Thailand | 1 | 0.5 | 8 | 9.5 |
| 7 | India | 1 | 0 | 0 | 1 |
| 8 | Chinese Taipei | 0 | 1 | 5 | 6 |
| 9 | Hong Kong | 0 | 0 | 1 | 1 |
| 9 | Philippines | 0 | 0 | 1 | 1 |
| Totals (10 entries) | | 40 | 40 | 78 | 158 |

== Unofficial/Invitational Asian Badminton Championships ==
| Year | Host City | Gold | Silver | Bronze |
|---|---|---|---|---|
| 1976 (I) | Bangkok | (Indonesia) Ade Chandra (Indonesia) Christian Hadinata | (China) Luan Jin (China) Tang Xianhu | (Thailand) Bandid Jaiyen (Thailand) Pichai Kongsiritaworn |
| 1977 | Hong Kong | (Indonesia) Tjun Tjun (Indonesia) Johan Wahjudi | (Indonesia) Ade Chandra (Indonesia) Christian Hadinata | (China) Sun Zhian (China) Yao Ximing |
| 1978 | Peking | (China) Lin Shihchuan (China) Tang Xianhu | (India) Syed Modi (India) Prakash Padukone | (Pakistan) Javed Iqbal (Pakistan) Tariq Wadood |
| 1980 | Bangkok | (China) Li Zhifeng (China) Yang Kesen | (Thailand) Bandid Jaiyen (Thailand) Preecha Sopajaree | (Thailand) Sawei Chanseorasmee (Thailand) Sarit Pisudchaikul |
| 1980 | Bangkok | (China) Li Zhifeng (China) Yang Kesen | (Thailand) Bandid Jaiyen (Thailand) Preecha Sopajaree | (China) Chen Changjie (China) Wang Yueping |
| 1988 | Bandar Lampung | (China) Zhang Qiang (China) Zhou Jincan | (South Korea) Lee Sang-bok (South Korea) Park Joo-bong | (Indonesia) Aryono Miranat (Indonesia) Joko Suprianto |
| 1988 | Bandar Lampung | (China) Zhang Qiang (China) Zhou Jincan | (South Korea) Lee Sang-bok (South Korea) Park Joo-bong | (Thailand) Komchan Promsarin (Thailand) Siripong Siripool |
