= 1962 Asian Badminton Championships – Men's team =

Badminton championship in Kuala Lumpur, Malaysia

Men's team at the 1962 Asian Badminton Championships
- Venue: Stadium Negara
- Location: Kuala Lumpur, Malaysia
- Dates: 21 – 28 April 1962

The men's team tournament at the inaugural Asian Badminton Championships, also known as the Tunku Abdul Rahman Cup (Malay: Piala Tunku Abdul Rahman) took place from 21 to 28 April 1962 at Stadium Negara in Kuala Lumpur, Malaysia. The trophy is named after Tunku Abdul Rahman, the first prime minister of Malaysia. A total of 12 teams competed in this event.

== Results ==
=== Bracket ===
Round of 16
Thailand	5
Nepal	0
Formosa	5
Philippines	0
Malaya	5
Burma	0
Hong Kong	5
Ceylon	0

Quarterfinals
Indonesia	5
North Borneo	0
Thailand	5
Formosa	0
Malaya	5
Hong Kong	0
Pakistan	3
Sarawak	2

Semifinals
Indonesia	3
Thailand	2
Malaya	5
Pakistan	0

Final
Indonesia	0
Malaya	5

=== Round of 16 ===
Thailand
5
Stadium Negara
21 April 1962

Nepal
0

			1	2	3
1	(Thailand) (Nepal)	Sangob Rattanusorn; Singha Bahadur Basnyat	15; 8	15; 0
2	(Thailand) (Nepal)	Somsook Boonyasukhanonda; Singha Bahadur Basnyat	15; 5	15; 1
3	(Thailand) (Nepal)	Sanguan Anandhanonda / Chuchart Vatanatham; P. R. Joshi / Akrur N. Rana	15; 0	15; 2
4	(Thailand) (Nepal)	Somsook Boonyasukhanonda; Singha Bahadur Basnyat	15; 5	15; 7
5	(Thailand) (Nepal)	Sangob Rattanusorn; Akrur N. Rana	15; 1	15; 0

Malaya
5
Stadium Negara
21 April 1962

Burma
0

			1	2	3
1	(Malaysia) (Myanmar)	Billy Ng; S. P. Barua	15; 4	15; 3
2	(Malaysia) (Myanmar)	Teh Kew San; Myint Kyi	15; 5	15; 1
3	(Malaysia) (Myanmar)	Ng Boon Bee / Tan Yee Khan; S. P. Barua / Myint Htoon	15; 1	15; 9
4	(Malaysia) (Myanmar)	Billy Ng; Myint Kyi	15; 6	15; 0
5	(Malaysia) (Myanmar)	Teh Kew San; S. P. Barua	15; 2	15; 2

Formosa
5
Stadium Negara
22 April 1962

Philippines
0

			1	2	3
1	(Taiwan) (Philippines)	Lo Man-fei; Armando Yanga	15; 11	15; 5
2	(Taiwan) (Philippines)	Ho Wen-ming; Conrado Co	15; 9	10; 15	15; 12
3	(Taiwan) (Philippines)	Shih Chin-piao / Hou Liang-chin; Armando Yanga / Oscar Yanga	8; 15	15; 5	15; 9
4	(Taiwan) (Philippines)	Lo Man-fei; Conrado Co	15; 4	15; 2
5	(Taiwan) (Philippines)	Ho Wen-ming; Armando Yanga	15; 11	9; 15	15; 5

Hong Kong
5
Stadium Negara
22 April 1962

Ceylon
0

			1	2	3
1	(Hong Kong) (Dominion of Ceylon)	Chu Sai Wah; Nagalingam Rasalingam	15; 7	15; 9
2	(Hong Kong) (Dominion of Ceylon)	George Ma; V. Sriskandarajah	6; 15	15; 1	15; 10
3	(Hong Kong) (Dominion of Ceylon)	Chu Sai Wah / Ramon Young; Gerry Chandrasena / A. R. L. Wijesekera	17; 14	13; 15	15; 7
4	(Hong Kong) (Dominion of Ceylon)	George Ma; Nagalingam Rasalingam	4; 15	17; 14	15; 0
5	(Hong Kong) (Dominion of Ceylon)	Chu Sai Wah; V. Sriskandarajah	15; 10	15; 4

=== Quarter-finals ===
Indonesia
5
Stadium Negara
23 April 1962

North Borneo
0

			1	2	3
1	(Indonesia) (Crown Colony of North Borneo)	Liem Tjeng Kiang; Gilbert Chung	15; 2	15; 5
2	(Indonesia) (Crown Colony of North Borneo)	Johnny Tjoa; Francis Raja	15; 6	15; 5
3	(Indonesia) (Crown Colony of North Borneo)	Tutang Djamaluddin / Abdul Patah Unang; Lai Wui Meng / Raymond Tan	15; 0	15; 1
4	(Indonesia) (Crown Colony of North Borneo)	Liem Tjeng Kiang; Francis Raja	15; 0	15; 2
5	(Indonesia) (Crown Colony of North Borneo)	Johnny Tjoa; Gilbert Chung	15; 1	15; 0

Pakistan
3
Stadium Negara
23 April 1962

Sarawak
2

			1	2	3
1	(Pakistan) (Crown Colony of Sarawak)	Masood Khan; Lim Swee Yang	15; 8	15; 11
2	(Pakistan) (Crown Colony of Sarawak)	Akram Baig; Lim Hiok Seng	3; 15	15; 9	3; 15
3	(Pakistan) (Crown Colony of Sarawak)	Wajahat Ali / Naqi Mohsin; Lim Swee Yang / Sian Liang Siew	15; 11	2; 15	6; 15
4	(Pakistan) (Crown Colony of Sarawak)	Masood Khan; Lim Hiok Seng	15; 10	15; 6
5	(Pakistan) (Crown Colony of Sarawak)	Akram Baig; Lim Swee Yang	15; 11	15; 9

Thailand
5
Stadium Negara
24 April 1962

Formosa
0

			1	2	3
1	(Thailand) (Taiwan)	Somsook Boonyasukhanonda; Shih Chin-piao	15; 8	15; 5
2	(Thailand) (Taiwan)	Sanguan Anandhanonda; Ho Wen-ming	15; 5	15; 7
3	(Thailand) (Taiwan)	Sangob Rattanusorn / Chuchart Vatanatham; Huang Yen-lin / Lo Man-fei	15; 5	15; 3
4	(Thailand) (Taiwan)	Sanguan Anandhanonda; Shih Chin-piao	15; 1	15; 7
5	(Thailand) (Taiwan)	Somsook Boonyasukhanonda; Ho Wen-ming	15; 7	15; 10

Malaya
5
Stadium Negara
24 April 1962

Hong Kong
0

			1	2	3
1	(Malaysia) (Hong Kong)	Teh Kew San; Chu Sai Wah	15; 6	15; 9
2	(Malaysia) (Hong Kong)	Billy Ng; George Ma	15; 7	15; 2
3	(Malaysia) (Hong Kong)	Ng Boon Bee / Tan Yee Khan; Chu Sai Wah / George Ma	15; 3	15; 5
4	(Malaysia) (Hong Kong)	Teh Kew San; George Ma	15; 1	15; 1
5	(Malaysia) (Hong Kong)	Billy Ng; Chu Sai Wah	15; 3	15; 5

=== Semi-finals ===
Malaya
5
Stadium Negara
26 April 1962

Pakistan
0

			1	2	3
1	(Malaysia) (Pakistan)	Billy Ng; Naqi Mohsin	15; 4	15; 7
2	(Malaysia) (Pakistan)	Teh Kew San; Masood Khan	15; 7	15; 9
3	(Malaysia) (Pakistan)	Ng Boon Bee / Tan Yee Khan; Wajahat Ali / Akram Baig	15; 2	15; 3
4	(Malaysia) (Pakistan)	Teh Kew San; Naqi Mohsin	15; 9	15; 7
5	(Malaysia) (Pakistan)	Billy Ng; Masood Khan	15; 4	18; 13

Indonesia
3
Stadium Negara
26 April 1962

Thailand
2

			1	2	3
1	(Indonesia) (Thailand)	Liem Tjeng Kiang; Sangob Rattanusorn	5; 15	8; 15
2	(Indonesia) (Thailand)	Johnny Tjoa; Somsook Boonyasukhanonda	11; 15	15; 10	10; 15
3	(Indonesia) (Thailand)	Tutang Djamaluddin / Abdul Patah Unang; Sanguan Anandhanonda / Chuchart Vatanatham	15; 11	15; 7
4	(Indonesia) (Thailand)	Liem Tjeng Kiang; Somsook Boonyasukhanonda	15; 12	18; 13
5	(Indonesia) (Thailand)	Johnny Tjoa; Sangob Rattanusorn	15; 13	7; 15	15; 4

=== Final ===
Malaya
5
Stadium Negara
28 April 1962

Indonesia
0

			1	2	3
1	(Malaysia) (Indonesia)	Billy Ng; Liem Tjeng Kiang	15; 11	15; 11
2	(Malaysia) (Indonesia)	Teh Kew San; Johnny Tjoa	13; 18	15; 3	15; 2
3	(Malaysia) (Indonesia)	Ng Boon Bee / Tan Yee Khan; Tutang Djamaluddin / Abdul Patah Unang	15; 2	15; 8
4	(Malaysia) (Indonesia)	Billy Ng; Johnny Tjoa				w/o
5	(Malaysia) (Indonesia)	Teh Kew San; Liem Tjeng Kiang	15; 8	15; 2
