= 1967 Thomas Cup squads =

This article lists the squads for the 1967 Thomas Cup participating teams. The age listed for each player is on 31 May 1967 which was the first day of the tournament.

== Teams ==
=== Denmark ===
Six players represented Denmark in the 1967 Thomas Cup.

Name	DoB/Age
Erland Kops	14 January 1937 (aged 30)
Svend Andersen	18 March 1945 (aged 22)
Henning Borch	9 March 1938 (aged 29)
Per Walsøe	8 June 1943 (aged 23)
Tom Bacher	16 November 1941 (aged 25)
Jørgen Mortensen	30 April 1941 (aged 26)

=== Indonesia ===
Nine players represented Indonesia in the 1967 Thomas Cup.

Name	DoB/Age
Tan Joe Hok	11 August 1937 (aged 29)
Ferry Sonneville	3 January 1931 (aged 36)
Rudy Hartono	18 August 1949 (aged 17)
Muljadi	11 September 1942 (aged 24)
Abdul Patah Unang	1937 (aged 29–30)
Agus Susanto	1940 (aged 26–27)
Darmadi	1945 (aged 21–22)
Darmawan Supatera	1932 (aged 34–35)
Indratno	1945 (aged 21–22)

=== Japan ===
Six players represented Japan in the 1967 Thomas Cup.

Name	DoB/Age
Eiichi Sakai	1939 (aged 27–28)
Takeshi Miyanaga	1940 (aged 26–27)
Masao Akiyama	1943 (aged 23–24)
Takeshi Anzawa	1943 (aged 23–24)
Ippei Kojima	1944 (aged 22–23)
Yoshio Mori	1946 (aged 20–21)

=== Malaysia ===
Six players represented Malaysia in the 1967 Thomas Cup. Five players were selected as reserves.

Name	DoB/Age
Tan Aik Huang	14 February 1946 (aged 21)
Yew Cheng Hoe	1943 (aged 23–24)
Teh Kew San	26 January 1935 (aged 32)
Ng Boon Bee	17 December 1937 (aged 29)
Tan Yee Khan	24 September 1940 (aged 26)
Billy Ng	1940 (aged 26–27)
Reserve
Omar Manap	1935 (aged 32–33)
Lee Guan Chong	1940 (aged 26–27)
Khor Cheng Chye	1945 (aged 20–21)
Abdul Rahman Mohamed	6 May 1946 (aged 21)
Tan Aik Mong	6 April 1950 (aged 17)

=== United States ===
Six players represented the United States in the 1967 Thomas Cup.

Name	DoB/Age
Larry Saben	1946 (aged 20–21)
Don Paup	2 April 1939 (aged 28)
Tom Carmichael	1938 (aged 28–29)
Jim Poole	6 February 1932 (aged 35)
Ray Park	1942 (aged 24–25)
Stan Hales	16 March 1942 (aged 25)
