= 1964 Singapore Open =

Tournament details
- Dates: 28 February 1964– 1 March 1964
- Edition: 31st
- Venue: Singapore Badminton Hall
- Location: Geylang, Singapore

Champions
- Men's singles: (Malaysia) Billy Ng
- Women's singles: (Malaysia) Sylvia Tan
- Men's doubles: (Malaysia) Ng Boon Bee (Malaysia) Tan Yee Khan
- Women's doubles: (Malaysia) Lai Siew York (Malaysia) Sylvia Tan
- Mixed doubles: (Singapore) Tan Boon Liat (Singapore) Lim Choo Eng

The 1964 Singapore Open, also known as the 1964 Singapore Open Badminton Championships, took place from 28 February – 1 March 1964 at the Singapore Badminton Hall in Singapore.

== Final results ==
| Category | Winners | Runners-up | Score |
|---|---|---|---|
| Men's singles | (Malaysia) Billy Ng | (Malaysia) Khor Cheng Chye | 15–6, 7–15, 15–5 |
| Women's singles | (Malaysia) Sylvia Tan | (Malaysia) Lai Siew York | 11–5, 11–7 |
| Men's doubles | (Malaysia) Ng Boon Bee & Tan Yee Khan | (Malaysia) Lim Say Hup & Tan Aik Huang | 15–12, 15–6 |
| Women's doubles | (Malaysia) Lai Siew York & Sylvia Tan | (Singapore) Vivien Gwee & Woo Ti Soo | 15–2, 15–6 |
| Mixed doubles | (Singapore) Tan Boon Liat & Lim Choo Eng | (Singapore) Pang Kum Leong & Lily Sim | 15–5, 15–3 |
