= 1967 Singapore Open =

Tournament details
- Dates: 6 October 1967– 8 October 1967
- Edition: 34th
- Venue: Singapore Badminton Hall
- Location: Geylang, Singapore

Champions
- Men's singles: (Malaysia) Tan Aik Huang
- Women's singles: (Indonesia) Minarni
- Men's doubles: (Malaysia) Ng Boon Bee (Malaysia) Tan Yee Khan
- Women's doubles: (Indonesia) Retno Koestijah (Indonesia) Minarni
- Mixed doubles: (Indonesia) Darmadi (Indonesia) Minarni

The 1967 Singapore Open, also known as the 1967 Singapore Open Badminton Championships, took place from 6 to 8 October 1967 at the Singapore Badminton Hall in Singapore.

== Final results ==
Category	Winners	Runners-up	Score
Men's singles	(Malaysia) Tan Aik Huang	(Denmark) Erland Kops	15–11, 15–8
Women's singles	(Indonesia) Minarni	(Indonesia) Retno Koestijah	5–11, 11–6, retired
Men's doubles	(Malaysia) Ng Boon Bee & Tan Yee Khan	(Indonesia) Indratno & Mintarja	15–3, 15–8
Women's doubles	(Indonesia) Retno Koestijah & Minarni	(Japan) Noriko Takagi & Hiroe Amano	15–6, 18–13
Mixed doubles	(Indonesia) Darmadi & Minarni	(Malaysia) Ng Boon Bee & Rosalind Singha Ang	15–4, 15–5
