= Badminton at the 1967 SEAP Games =

SEA Games event

Badminton at the 1967 Southeast Asian Peninsular Games
- Venue: Kittikachorn Stadium
- Location: Bangkok, Thailand
- Dates: 9 – 16 December 1967
- Nations: 6

Badminton events for the 1967 SEAP Games were held at Bangkok, Thailand, between 9 and 16 December 1967. Host Thailand won gold medals in three disciplines while Malaysia stood second in the tally by winning two gold medals.

== Medalists ==
Event	Gold	Silver	Bronze
Men's singles	Sangob Rattanusorn; Thailand	Somsook Boonyasukhanonda; Thailand	Billy Ng; Malaysia
Men's singles	Sangob Rattanusorn; Thailand	Somsook Boonyasukhanonda; Thailand	Yew Cheng Hoe; Malaysia
Women's singles	Thongkam Kingmanee; Thailand	Rosalind Singha Ang; Malaysia	Sumol Chanklum; Thailand
Women's singles	Thongkam Kingmanee; Thailand	Rosalind Singha Ang; Malaysia	Myint Myint Khin; Burma
Men's doubles	Ng Boon Bee; Tan Yee Khan; Malaysia	Narong Bhornchima; Raphi Kanchanaraphi; Thailand	Chavalert Chumkum; Sangob Rattanusorn; Thailand
Men's doubles	Ng Boon Bee; Tan Yee Khan; Malaysia	Narong Bhornchima; Raphi Kanchanaraphi; Thailand	Khor Cheng Chye; Yew Cheng Hoe; Malaysia
Women's doubles	Rosalind Singha Ang; Teoh Siew Yong; Malaysia	Ho Cheng Yoke; Sylvia Tan; Malaysia	Boopha Kaenthong; Mulliga Phitakarnop; Thailand
Women's doubles	Rosalind Singha Ang; Teoh Siew Yong; Malaysia	Ho Cheng Yoke; Sylvia Tan; Malaysia	Sumol Chanklum; Thongkam Kingmanee; Thailand
Mixed doubles	Chirasak Champakao; Sumol Chanklum; Thailand	Sila Ulao; Mulliga Phitakarnop; Thailand	Lee Guan Chong; Yap Hei Lin; Malaysia
Mixed doubles	Chirasak Champakao; Sumol Chanklum; Thailand	Sila Ulao; Mulliga Phitakarnop; Thailand	Ng Boon Bee; Teoh Siew Yong; Malaysia

== Semifinal results ==
Discipline	Winner	Runner-up	Score
Men's singles	(Thailand) Somsook Boonyasukhanonda	(Malaysia) Yew Cheng Hoe	9–15, 15–12, 15–8
Men's singles	(Thailand) Sangob Rattanusorn	(Malaysia) Billy Ng	15–9, 15–6
Women's singles	(Malaysia) Rosalind Singha Ang	(Thailand) Sumol Chanklum	11–3, 11–6
Women's singles	(Thailand) Thongkam Kingmanee	(Myanmar) Myint Myint Khin	11–6, 11–8
Men's doubles	(Malaysia) Ng Boon Bee & Tan Yee Khan	(Thailand) Chavalert Chumkum & Sangob Rattanusorn	15–11, 15–10
Men's doubles	(Thailand) Narong Bhornchima & Raphi Kanchanaraphi	(Malaysia) Khor Cheng Chye & Yew Cheng Hoe	15–13, 15–3
Women's doubles	(Malaysia) Rosalind Singha Ang & Teoh Siew Yong	(Thailand) Boopha Kaenthong & Mulliga Phitakarnop	15–5, 15–4
Women's doubles	(Malaysia) Sylvia Tan & Ho Cheng Yoke	(Thailand) Sumol Chanklum & Thongkam Kingmanee	15–13, 15–5
Mixed doubles	(Thailand) Chirasak Champakao & Sumol Chanklum	(Malaysia) Ng Boon Bee & Teoh Siew Yong	15–6, 15–10
Mixed doubles	(Thailand) Sila Ulao & Mulliga Phitakarnop	(Malaysia) Lee Guan Chong & Yap Hei Lin	9–15, 15–5, 15–6

== Final results ==
Discipline	Winner	Finalist	Score
Men's singles	(Thailand) Sangob Rattanusorn	(Thailand) Somsook Boonyasukhanonda	18–17, 17–14
Women's singles	(Thailand) Thongkam Kingmanee	(Malaysia) Rosalind Singha Ang	11–8, 2–11, 11–3
Men's doubles	(Malaysia) Ng Boon Bee & Tan Yee Khan	(Thailand) Raphi Kanchanaraphi & Narong Bhornchima	15–7, 15–8
Women's doubles	(Malaysia) Rosalind Singha Ang & Teoh Siew Yong	(Malaysia) Sylvia Tan & Ho Cheng Yoke	18–17, 15–8
Mixed doubles	(Thailand) Chirasak Champakao & Sumol Chanklum	(Thailand) Sila Ulao & Mulliga Phitakarnop	7–15, 15–7, 15–4

== Medal table ==
* Host nation (Thailand)

Rank	Nation	Gold	Silver	Bronze	Total
1	Thailand (THA)*	3	3	4	10
2	Malaysia (MAS)	2	2	5	9
3	Burma (BIR)	0	0	1	1
Totals (3 entries)		5	5	10	20
