= Badminton at the 1965 SEAP Games =

SEA Games event

Badminton at the 1965 Southeast Asian Peninsular Games
- Venue: Selangor Badminton Association Hall
- Location: Kuala Lumpur, Malaysia
- Dates: 14 – 21 December 1965
- Nations: 5

Badminton events for the 1965 SEAP Games were held at Kuala Lumpur, Malaysia, between 14 and 21 December 1965. Individual as well as Team competitions were conducted. At the end of the competitions, Malaysia emerged as top by winning five out of seven gold medals while Thailand settled with two gold medals.

== Medal table ==
* Host nation (Malaysia)

Rank	Nation	Gold	Silver	Bronze	Total
1	Malaysia*	5	3	3	11
2	Thailand	2	4	2	8
3	Singapore	0	0	2	2
Totals (3 entries)		7	7	7	21

== Medalists ==
Event	Gold	Silver	Bronze
Men's singles	Tan Aik Huang; Malaysia	Sangob Rattanusorn; Thailand	Soonchai Akyapisut; Thailand
Women's singles	Rosalind Singha Ang; Malaysia	Sumol Chanklum; Thailand	Teoh Siew Yong; Malaysia
Men's doubles	Ng Boon Bee; Tan Yee Khan; Malaysia	Narong Bhornchima; Raphi Kanchanaraphi; Thailand	Tan Aik Huang; Yew Cheng Hoe; Malaysia
Women's doubles	Pachara Pattabongse; Pratuang Pattabongse; Thailand	Rosalind Singha Ang; Teoh Siew Yong; Malaysia	Ho Cheng Yoke; Sylvia Tan; Malaysia
Mixed doubles	Ng Boon Bee; Teoh Siew Yong; Malaysia	Tan Yee Khan; Rosalind Singha Ang; Malaysia	Raphi Kanchanaraphi; Sumol Chanklum; Thailand
Men's team	Malaysia; Ng Boon Bee; Tan Aik Huang; Tan Yee Khan; Yew Cheng Hoe	Thailand; Soonchai Akyapisut; Narong Bhornchima; Raphi Kanchanaraphi; Sangob Rattanusorn	Singapore; Ismail Ibrahim; Omar Ibrahim; Wee Sen; Wong Tew Ghee
Women's team	Thailand; Sumol Chanklum; Bhoopha Koentong; Pachara Pattabongse; Pratuang Pattabongse	Malaysia; Rosalind Singha Ang; Ho Cheng Yoke; Sylvia Tan; Teoh Siew Yong	Singapore; Aishah Attan; Lim Choo Eng; Woo Ti Soo; Amy Yap
