= Badminton at the 1961 SEAP Games =

SEA Games event

Badminton at the 1961 Southeast Asian Peninsular Games
- Venue: Aung San National Indoor Stadium
- Location: Rangoon, Burma
- Dates: 11 – 16 December 1961
- Nations: 5

Badminton at the 1961 SEAP Games was held in Rangoon, Burma from 11 to 16 December in 1961. Five competitions were held in men's singles, men's doubles, women's singles, women's doubles and in mixed doubles.

== Medalists ==
Event	Gold	Silver	Bronze
Men's singles	Channarong Ratanaseangsuang; Thailand	Smas Slayman; Cambodia	Teh Kew San; Malaya
Men's doubles	Ng Boon Bee; Tan Yee Khan; Malaya	Narong Bhornchima; Raphi Kanchanaraphi; Thailand	Myint Htoon; Maung Hla; Burma
Women's singles	Tan Gaik Bee; Malaya	Pachara Pattabongse; Thailand	Sio Chin Chu; Burma
Women's doubles	Sumol Chanklum; Pankae Phongarn; Thailand	Tan Gaik Bee; Jean Moey; Malaya	Ma Thin Wa; Pamela Fink; Burma
Mixed doubles	Raphi Kanchanaraphi; Pankae Phongarn; Thailand	Ng Boon Bee; Ng Mei Ling; Malaya	Maung Hla; Ma Thida; Burma

== Results ==
=== Men's singles ===
Quarter-finals
Teh Kew San (MAL)	15	15
S. P. Barua (BIR)	7	6

Semi-finals
Channarong Ratanaseangsuang (THA)	15	11	15
Teh Kew San (MAL)	9	15	12
Vongdeuane (LAO)	8	4
Smas Slayman (CAM)	15	15

Gold medal match
Channarong Ratanaseangsuang (THA)	15	15
Smas Slayman (CAM)	1	3
Bronze medal match
Teh Kew San (MAL)	w	/	o
Vongdeuane (LAO)

=== Men's doubles ===
Quarter-finals
Ng Boon Bee (MAL); Tan Yee Khan (MAL)	15	15
Bounpheng Siaksone (LAO); Vongdeuane (LAO)	2	2

Semi-finals
Ng Boon Bee (MAL); Tan Yee Khan (MAL)	15	15
Oun Phen (CAM); Yan Saravuth (CAM)	2	2
Myint Htoon (BIR); Maung Hla (BIR)	9	9
Narong Bhornchima (THA); Raphi Kanchanaraphi (THA)	15	15

Gold medal match
Ng Boon Bee (MAL); Tan Yee Khan (MAL)	15	6	15
Narong Bhornchima (THA); Raphi Kanchanaraphi (THA)	8	15	10
Bronze medal match
Oun Phen (CAM); Yan Saravuth (CAM)	1	8
Myint Htoon (BIR); Maung Hla (BIR)	15	15

=== Women's singles ===
==== Round robin ====
Pos	Team	Pld	W	L	GF	GA	GD	PF	PA	PD	Pts	Qualification
1	Tan Gaik Bee (MAL)	2	2	0	4	1	+3	51	27	+24	2	Gold medal
2	Pachara Pattabongse (THA)	2	1	1	3	2	+1	48	31	+17	1	Silver medal
3	Sio Chin Chu (BIR) (H)	2	0	2	0	4	−4	3	44	−41	0	Bronze medal

Source: NewspaperSG
(H) Host

Date	Time	Player 1	Score	Player 2	Set 1	Set 2	Set 3
13 December	18:30	Pachara Pattabongse (Thailand)	2–0	(Myanmar) Sio Chin Chu	11–2	11–0	
13 December	19:00	Tan Gaik Bee (Malaysia)	2–0	(Myanmar) Sio Chin Chu	11–0	11–1	
14 December	18:00	Tan Gaik Bee (Malaysia)	2–0	(Thailand) Pachara Pattabongse	6–11	12–11	11–4

=== Women's doubles ===
==== Round robin ====
Pos	Team	Pld	W	L	GF	GA	GD	PF	PA	PD	Pts	Qualification
1	Sumol Chanklum (THA) Pankae Phongarn (THA)	2	2	0	4	1	+3	71	30	+41	2	Gold medal
2	Tan Gaik Bee (MAL) Jean Moey (MAL)	2	1	1	3	2	+1	59	43	+16	1	Silver medal
3	Ma Thin Wa (BIR) Pamela Fink (BIR) (H)	2	0	2	0	4	−4	3	60	−57	0	Bronze medal

Source: NewspaperSG
(H) Host

Date	Time	Player 1	Score	Player 2	Set 1	Set 2	Set 3
13 December	18:30	Sumol Chanklum (Thailand); Pankae Phongarn (Thailand)	2–0	(Malaysia) Tan Gaik Bee (Malaysia) Jean Moey	11–15	15–2	15–12
13 December	19:00	Ma Thin Wa (Myanmar); Pamela Fink (Myanmar)	0–2	(Malaysia) Tan Gaik Bee (Malaysia) Jean Moey	1–15	1–15	
14 December	18:00	Sumol Chanklum (Thailand); Pankae Phongarn (Thailand)	2–0	(Myanmar) Ma Thin Wa (Myanmar) Pamela Fink	15–0	15–1	

=== Mixed doubles ===
==== Round robin ====
Pos	Team	Pld	W	L	GF	GA	GD	PF	PA	PD	Pts	Qualification
1	Raphi Kanchanaraphi (THA) Pankae Phongarn (THA)	2	2	0	4	0	+4	71	30	+41	2	Gold medal
2	Ng Boon Bee (MAL) Ng Mei Ling (MAL)	2	1	1	2	2	0	49	43	+6	1	Silver medal
3	Maung Hla (BIR) Ma Thida (BIR) (H)	2	0	2	0	4	−4	3	40	−37	0	Bronze medal

Source: NewspaperSG
(H) Host

Date	Time	Player 1	Score	Player 2	Set 1	Set 2	Set 3
13 December	18:30	Ng Boon Bee (Malaysia); Ng Mei Ling (Malaysia)	2–0	(Myanmar) Maung Hla (Myanmar) Ma Thida	15–7	15–4	
13 December	19:00	Raphi Kanchanaraphi (Thailand); Pankae Phongarn (Thailand)	2–0	(Myanmar) Maung Hla (Myanmar) Ma Thida	15–2	15–11	
14 December	18:00	Raphi Kanchanaraphi (Thailand); Pankae Phongarn (Thailand)	2–0	(Malaysia) Ng Boon Bee (Malaysia) Ng Mei Ling	14–18	15–8	15–9

== Medal table ==
* Host nation (Burma)

Rank	Nation	Gold	Silver	Bronze	Total
1	Thailand (THA)	3	2	0	5
2	Malaya (MAL)	2	2	1	5
3	Cambodia (CAM)	0	1	0	1
4	Burma (BIR)	0	0	4	4
5	Laos (LAO)	0	0	0	0
Totals (5 entries)		5	5	5	15
