= Liem Tjeng Kiang =

Indonesian badminton player (born 1935)

Sport
- Sport: Badminton
Medal record
Men's badminton
Representing Indonesia
Asian Games
Gold medal – first place	1962 Jakarta	Men's team
Silver medal – second place	1962 Jakarta	Men's doubles
Asian Championships
Silver medal – second place	1962 Kuala Lumpur	Men's team
Bronze medal – third place	1962 Kuala Lumpur	Men's doubles

Liem Tjeng Kiang (born 1935) is a former Indonesian badminton player active in the 1960s.

== Profile ==
Liem Tjeng Kiang is an early generation badminton player in Indonesia, he is one of the players who managed to bring two medals at the Asian Games 1962, namely gold in the men's team and silver in men's doubles in a tense match against the malaysian doubles as well as the 1962 Asian Championships, brought home two medals, namely silver in the men's team and bronze in the men's doubles.

== Achievements ==
=== Asian Games ===
Men's doubles

Year	Venue	Partner	Opponent	Score	Result	Ref
1962	Istora Senayan, Jakarta, Indonesia	(Indonesia) Tan Joe Hok	(Malaysia) Tan Yee Khan (Malaysia) Ng Boon Bee	13–15, 17–18	Silver	

=== Asian Championships ===
Men's doubles

Year	Venue	Partner	Opponent	Score	Result	Ref
1962	Kuala Lumpur, Malaysia	(Indonesia) Tjap Han Tiong	(Malaysia) Teh Kew San (Malaysia) Lim Say Hup	5–15, 4–15	Bronze	
