= Tan Aik Huang =

Malaysian badminton player

Tan Aik Huang 陈奕芳
Personal information
- Born: 14 February 1946 (age 80) Singapore, Straits Settlements
- Years active: 1962-1973

Sport
- Country: Malaysia
- Sport: Badminton
- Handedness: Right
- Event: Men's singles & Men's doubles
Medal record
Men's badminton
Representing Malaysia
Thomas Cup
| Gold medal – first place | 1967 Jakarta | Men's team |
| Silver medal – second place | 1970 Kuala Lumpur | Men's team |
Commonwealth Games
| Gold medal – first place | 1966 Kingston | Men's singles |
| Gold medal – first place | 1966 Kingston | Men's doubles |
Asian Championships
| Silver medal – second place | 1969 Manila | Men's team |
| Silver medal – second place | 1971 Jakarta | Men's team |
Southeast Asian Games
| Gold medal – first place | 1965 Kuala Lumpur | Men's singles |
| Gold medal – first place | 1965 Kuala Lumpur | Men's team |
| Gold medal – first place | 1971 Kuala Lumpur | Men's singles |
| Gold medal – first place | 1971 Kuala Lumpur | Men's team |
| Bronze medal – third place | 1965 Kuala Lumpur | Men's doubles |

Datuk Tan Aik Huang PJN AMN (Chinese: 陳奕芳; pinyin: Chén Yìfāng, born 14 February 1946) is a Malaysian retired badminton player noted for his footwork and patience. He was a former All England Open champion, having won the men's singles title in 1966. Tan was a member of four Malaysian Thomas Cup (men's international) teams including its world champion team of 1967. He also won numerous major international singles titles during the mid- and late 1960s including the Danish Open, the US Open, the Canadian Open, the Malaysian Open and the Singapore Open. Additionally, Tan holds the distinction of being the first Malaysian shuttler in the Commonwealth Games to win gold medals in two individual events. He is the elder brother of former national badminton player Tan Aik Mong. Alongside Wong Peng Soon and Eddy Choong, he is the only Malaysian to have won both the Thomas Cup and All England singles titles.

== Early life ==
Tan was born on 14 February 1946 in Singapore and later relocated to Penang with his family during his childhood. He is the son of Tan Cheng Hoe, who formerly held the position of vice-president in the Penang Badminton Association. He had a younger brother named Aik Mong, who was also a national badminton player. Tan received his primary education at Pykett Methodist School and later attended Methodist High School. His interest in badminton began in 1957, when he was 11 years old and started training under the guidance of Penang's veteran player Lee Peng Joo. A year later, in 1958, his father took him to watch the Malayan Open held in Penang. There, he was so inspired by the high level of play by the top foreign players that he decided to pursue badminton more seriously.

Tan's talent began to shine through as he won the boys' under 14 singles and doubles titles in the Penang Combined School Championships. By 1961, he had already become the champion in the boys' under 19 category and took part in the first Asian Badminton Confederation Championships where he was the runner-up in the schoolboys doubles event. Tan continued to impress at the junior level, winning the 1962 Penang boys' singles and doubles titles and eventually gaining promotion to senior status. He also won the first three edition of the Malaysian Schools Open's singles titles from 1963 to 1965.

== Career ==
=== 1962: Senior debut and early success ===
Tan's first foray into the senior tournament was at the 1962 Perak Open, where he made it to the semi-finals of the men's singles event but lost to Tan Yee Khan in a closely contested match that lasted three games. His first success came at the Penang Open, where he upset Thomas Cup player Ng Boon Bee in the singles final. At just 16 years old, he became the youngest winner of the tournament.

=== 1963: First All-Malayan appearance ===
At the 1963 Penang Open, Tan, who was the defending champion, lost in the men's singles final to Yew Cheng Hoe by a score of 6–15, 4–15. In the Malayan Open that followed, he faced Yew Cheng Hoe once again and was defeated in the semi-finals in straight games.

=== 1964: Two state titles ===
In 1964, Tan competed at his first Singapore Open and was eliminated in the quarter-finals by Johor's Billy Ng in a hard-fought three-set match. The following week, he clinched his second senior title by defeating Teh Kew San in the final of the Malacca Open. He reached two more finals at the Selangor and Perak Opens but lost to Yew Cheng Hoe in rubber games on both occasions. However, at the Penang Open, Tan finally got his revenge by defeating Yew Cheng Hoe, the defending champion, in the singles final in straight games. In May, at the World Invitation Tournament held in Tokyo, Japan, he put on a great showing, reaching the final in the men's singles but unfortunately lost to his fellow Thomas Cup teammate, Tan Yee Khan.

=== 1965: First Malaysia Open title and SEAG gold ===
In 1965, at the first Malaysia Open (after the formation of the federation), Tan reached the men's singles final but was upset by the unseeded Billy Ng. In March, he was the runner-up to Erland Kops in both the World Invitation Tournament held in Glasgow, Scotland and in the All England Open. In August, at the second Malaysia Open, he became the youngest champion at 19 years old by beating arch-rival Yew Cheng Hoe in the men's singles final. This victory improved Tan's head to head record against Yew to 3–4. In October, he successfully defended his Penang Open title by defeating Khor Cheng Chye in the final to win his third title. In December, at the Southeast Asian Games, Tan won the gold medal in the men's singles event. He defeated Thailand's Sangob Rattanusorn in the final, winning in three games with a score of 15–7, 7–15, 15–7 in a match that lasted an hour. This was Tan's first major games, and he lived up to expectations by delivering a gold medal performance.

=== 1966: All England, 12 international titles and Commonwealth golds ===
Tan receiving the men's singles trophy after winning the 1966 U.S. Open.

In 1966, Tan kicked off his Europe tour by defeating Singapore's Lee Kin Tat in a hard-fought three-set match at the Surrey Open. At the Denmark Open, he suffered a defeat in the men's singles quarter-finals to Knud Aage Nielsen, a former All England champion. However, he did reach the men's doubles final with Yew Cheng Hoe, but they lost to the top-seeded Malaysian pair of Ng Boon Bee and Tan Yee Khan. At the Swedish Badminton Championships, Tan had a significant win over Erland Kops, the World No. 1, en route to winning the men's singles title. He then defeated Kurt Johnsson in the final to clinch the championship. At the World Invitation Tournament held in Glasgow, Scotland, he did one better than the previous year by reaching the men's singles final where he defeated Japan's Masao Akiyama to win the title. In late March, Tan had the biggest breakthrough of his career when he won the men's singles title at the All England Open, then considered the unofficial World Badminton Championships, by defeating Masao Akiyama 15–7, 15–4 in the final. He maintained his impressive form in the Americas tour by winning the Canada Open title, beating his compatriot Yew Cheng Hoe in the final. He followed that up by beating his teammate again in the US Open to clinch his fifth men's singles title in a row during the tour. In August, Tan participated in his second major games, the 1966 British Commonwealth Games, where he won both the singles and doubles titles. This achievement made him the first Malaysian badminton player to win two gold medals in individual events at the Commonwealth Games. In September, at the third Malaysia Open, Tan successfully defended his men's singles title by beating Indonesia's Muljadi in the final. He also won the men's doubles title with his partner Eddy Choong, defeating the Thai pair of Sangob Rattanusorn and Chavalert Chumkum. His red hot form continued at the Perak Open where he would beat the up-and-coming Rudy Hartono of Indonesia, in three games, to win the men's singles final. Tan's winning streaks continued with yet another title at the Penang Open, his fourth, when he defeated Muljadi in the men's singles final. He ended the year with a remarkable record of winning 12 titles from 11 international tournaments he participated in.

=== 1967: Thomas Cup champion, First Denmark and Singapore Open titles ===
In 1967, at the Malaysia Pesta, Tan secured another international men's singles title after he defeated Rudy Hartono in the tournament final. However, he was unable to clinch the men's doubles title, as he and his partner Teh Kew San lost to Malaysia's No. 1 pair, Ng Boon Bee and Tan Yee Khan. In March, Tan add another men's singles title to his collection when he defeated Erland Kops to win his first Denmark Open title. At the All England Open, he reached the final again but suffered a shock defeat to Erland Kops, losing in two straight games. In June, as a member of the 1967 Thomas Cup squad, Tan won two out of his three matches to help Malaysia beat Indonesia in a highly controversial final in which play was suspended due to the unruly crowd. Both teams were later offered a chance to resume their clash in New Zealand but Indonesia declined, thus handing Malaysia the cup. At the Penang Open, Tan continued his winning streak by securing his fifth men's singles title and fourth consecutive title at the tournament. He defeated his rival Yew Cheng Hoe in a thrilling final that lasted for 53 minutes. In October, he won the Singapore Open title for the first time, defeating a familiar foe in Erland Kops.

=== 1968: Third Malaysia and Second Singapore Opens titles ===
In 1968, at the German Open, Tan reached the men's singles finals but lost to Erland Kops in rubber games. At the All England Open, he made yet another final, which marked an impressive run of four straight appearances in the All England finals from 1965 through 1968. He lost hard-fought matches to Erland Kops in '65 and '67 and to Rudy Hartono in '68. In May, Tan suffered a surprise loss in the singles final of the New Zealand International Invitation badminton tournament to Svend Pri, with Svend winning the match 8–15, 15–8, 9–15. However, he managed to win the doubles title by partnering with Teh Kew San to beat Svend Pri and Per Walsøe. In October, Tan won two more men's singles title at the Malaysia and Singapore Opens by beating Ippei Kojima of Japan on both occasion.

=== 1969: Second World Invitational triumph ===
In 1969, Tan participated in the Asian Badminton Confederation tournament held in Manila, Philippines, where he lost to Muljadi. This loss contributed to Indonesia's victory over Malaysia with a score of 3–2, resulting in Malaysia being dethroned as the Asian Team champion. In the individual event that followed, he suffered another defeat to Muljadi and was unable to medal in the competition. In March, at the Denmark Open, Tan as the No. 2 seed was beaten by unseeded Tom Bacher of Denmark in the men's singles semi-finals. He and his brother, Tan Aik Mong, also suffered a surprise loss in the men's doubles final. They were defeated by the scratch pair of Ippei Kojima and Bjarne Andersen. At the World Invitation Tournament held in Glasgow, Scotland, Tan achieved an impressive victory by defeating the current All England champion Rudy Hartono in the semifinals in straight games. He then proceeded to win the tournament by defeating Svend Pri in the singles final. At the All England Open, Tan suffered a surprising defeat in the semi-finals to Indonesia's Darmadi. This was the first time in five attempts that he had failed to reach the final of the prestigious tournament. He also suffered a defeat in the men's doubles semi-final with his brother Tan Aik Mong, losing to the English pair of David Eddy and Roger Powell. At the Canada Open, Tan was defeated by Sture Johnsson, the Swedish and European champion, in the semi-finals of the men's singles event. In April, at the US Open, he experienced a defeat to Muljadi in the quarter-finals in a closely contested three-set match that ended 12–15, 15–6, 9–15. At the Malaysia Pesta held later that month, Tan had a surprising loss to his fellow countryman Punch Gunalan in the men's singles semi-finals after three exhausting games. He also faced defeat in the semi-finals of the men's doubles event with his brother, Tan Aik Mong. At the Singapore Pesta that followed, Tan lost to Masao Akiyama in the quarter-finals in a three set battle that lasted 45 minutes. In the men's doubles, he and his brother Tan Aik Mong finished in third place after beating Yew Cheng Hoe and Tan Soon Hooi in the third-place match.

=== 1970: Thomas Cup runner-up ===
In 1970, at the Thomas Cup final versus Indonesia, Tan played in three matches. He won his third singles match against Darmadi but lost both of his doubles matches, partnering with Ng Tat Wai against Rudy Hartono and Indra Gunawan and against Indratno and Mintarja. Malaysia eventually, lost the Thomas Cup to Indonesia with a score of 2–7.

=== 1971: SEAG team and individual golds ===
In 1971, Tan participated in the Asian Badminton Confederation tournament held in Jakarta, Indonesia, where Malaysia lost 2–3 to Indonesia in the team event final. He played in two singles matches, lost the first to Rudy Hartono before beating Christian Hadinata in the other. Although Tan played in both the men's singles and doubles individual event that followed, he did not medaled. In October, he only took part in the men's doubles event with Dominic Soong at the Singapore Open, but the pair suffered an early round exit to Indonesians Lee Wah Chin and Theng Thay Hien. In December, at the 1971 Southeast Asian Games held in Kuala Lumpur, Malaysia, Tan was part of the men's team that won gold in the inter-team event. In the individual event, he defeated teammate Punch Gunalan to win the men's singles gold for the second time.

=== 1972: Two international titles ===
In 1972, Tan won the Belgium Open men's singles title in his first stop on the Europe tour. However, he lost in the men's singles final at the German Open to Sture Johnsson. At the Denmark Open, Tan lost in the men's singles quarter-finals to Ippei Kojima. After a two-year absence, he made a return to the All England Open, but he was knocked out by Svend Pri in the quarter-finals of the men's singles event in straight games. In May, at the Jakarta Open, Tan and his brother, Tan Aik Mong made it to the final of the men's doubles event but were defeated in a three-set match by the Indonesian pair of Ade Chandra and Christian Hadinata. In October, at the Singapore Open, Tan was defeated in the men's singles semi-finals by Indonesia's Iie Sumirat. However, he managed to win the men's doubles title with his brother Tan Aik Mong, as their opponents Punch Gunalan and Ng Boon Bee had to concede the match due to Ng's injury. In November, Tan and his brother, Tan Aik Mong lost to the Danish pair of Svend Pri and Flemming Delfs in the men's doubles quarter-finals at the Maharashtra International badminton tournament held in Bombay, India. At the World Invitation Badminton Championships in Jakarta, Indonesia, Tan and his brother, Tan Aik Mong took part in the tourney but they lost in the first round to Thai duo Bandid Jaiyen and Sangob Rattanusorn.

== Retirement ==
Tan retired from international competition at the age of 28, citing the fast pace of the game as a factor in his decision. Years later, he returned to the sport and won several more titles on the veteran circuit. He also served on the national coaching committee in a minor capacity. Tan still maintains an active and competitive lifestyle, balancing his time between his family in Kuala Lumpur and managing several part-time businesses.

== Personal life ==
Tan graduated with a bachelor's degree in physics from the University of Malaya. He also has a master's degree in business management from the Asian Institute of Management, Manila, Philippines.

In February 1974, Tan married his long time girlfriend, Loh Wei Ling, a former Penang junior champion, at the Civil Marriage Registry in Kuala Lumpur, Malaysia.

They have one son, Tan Yi Liang, a senior journalist with The Star.

== Awards ==
Tan received the IBF Player of the Year award in 1966. He was named as Malaysia's Sportsman of the Year for 1967.

== Achievements ==
=== Southeast Asian Peninsular Games ===
Men's singles
| Year | Venue | Opponent | Score | Result |
|---|---|---|---|---|
| 1965 | Selangor Badminton Hall, Kuala Lumpur, Malaysia | (Thailand) Sangob Rattanusorn | 15–7, 7–15, 15–7 | Gold |
| 1971 | Stadium Negara, Kuala Lumpur, Malaysia | (Malaysia) Punch Gunalan | 15–12, 15–11 | Gold |

=== Commonwealth Games ===
Men's singles
| Year | Venue | Opponent | Score | Result |
|---|---|---|---|---|
| 1966 | Kingston, Jamaica | (Malaysia) Yew Cheng Hoe | 15–8, 15–8 | Gold |

Men's doubles
| Year | Venue | Partner | Opponent | Score | Result |
|---|---|---|---|---|---|
| 1966 | Kingston, Jamaica | (Malaysia) Yew Cheng Hoe | (Malaysia) Ng Boon Bee (Malaysia) Tan Yee Khan | 15–14, 15–5 | Gold |

=== International tournaments ===
Men's singles
| Year | Tournament | Opponent | Score | Result |
|---|---|---|---|---|
| 1964 | Malaysia Open | (Malaysia) Billy Ng | 15–4, 12–15, 10–15 | (silver) Runner-up |
| 1965 | Malaysia Open | (Malaysia) Yew Cheng Hoe | 15–8, 15–9 | (gold) Winner |
| 1965 | All England | (Denmark) Erland Kops | 13–15, 12–15 | (silver) Runner-up |
| 1966 | All England | (Japan) Masao Akiyama | 15–7, 15–4 | (gold) Winner |
| 1966 | Canada Open | (Malaysia) Yew Cheng Hoe | 15–11, 15–3 | (gold) Winner |
| 1966 | U.S. Open | (Malaysia) Yew Cheng Hoe | 15–5, 15–1 | (gold) Winner |
| 1966 | Malaysia Open | (Indonesia) Muljadi | 15–12, 15–5 | (gold) Winner |
| 1967 | Denmark Open | (Denmark) Erland Kops | 15–7, 15–11 | (gold) Winner |
| 1967 | All England | (Denmark) Erland Kops | 12–15, 10–15 | (silver) Runner-up |
| 1967 | Singapore Open | (Denmark) Erland Kops | 15–11, 15–8 | (gold) Winner |
| 1968 | German Open | (Denmark) Erland Kops | 9–15, 18–17, 5–15 | (silver) Runner-up |
| 1968 | All England | (Indonesia) Rudy Hartono | 12–15, 9–15 | (silver) Runner-up |
| 1968 | Malaysia Open | (Japan) Ippei Kojima | 15–4, 13–15, 15–6 | (gold) Winner |
| 1968 | Singapore Open | (Japan) Ippei Kojima | 15–12, 15–4 | (gold) Winner |
| 1972 | German Open | (Sweden) Sture Johnsson | 18–15, 5–15, 7–15 | (silver) Runner-up |
| 1972 | Belgian International | (Malaysia) Punch Gunalan | 15–4, 15–1 | (gold) Winner |

Men's doubles
| Year | Tournament | Partner | Opponent | Score | Result |
|---|---|---|---|---|---|
| 1966 | Denmark Open | (Malaysia) Yew Cheng Hoe | (Malaysia) Tan Yee Khan (Malaysia) Ng Boon Bee | 13–15, 10–15 | (silver) Runner-up |
| 1966 | Malaysia Open | (Malaysia) Eddy Choong | (Thailand) Sangob Rattanusorn (Thailand) Chavalert Chumkum | 17–14, 15–12 | (gold) Winner |
| 1969 | Denmark Open | (Malaysia) Tan Aik Mong | (Japan) Ippei Kojima (Denmark) Bjarne Andersen | 9–15, 15–6, 7–15 | (silver) Runner-up |
| 1972 | Singapore Open | (Malaysia) Tan Aik Mong | (Malaysia) Punch Gunalan (Malaysia) Ng Boon Bee | 15–11, retired | (gold) Winner |
| 1972 | Jakarta Open | (Malaysia) Tan Aik Mong | (Indonesia) Ade Chandra (Indonesia) Christian Hadinata | 10–15, 15–9, 6–15 | (silver) Runner-up |

== Honours ==
- Member of the Order of the Defender of the Realm (AMN) (1968).
- Commander of the Order of Meritorious Service (PJN) – Datuk (2023).
