= Chavalert Chumkum =

Thai badminton player (born 1939)

Personal information
- Born: 14 September 1939
- Died: 3 July 2011 (aged 71)

Sport
- Country: Thailand
- Sport: Badminton
Medal record
Men's badminton
Representing Thailand
Thomas Cup
Silver medal – second place	1961 Jakarta	Men's team
Asian Games
Gold medal – first place	1966 Bangkok	Men's team
Silver medal – second place	1970 Bangkok	Men's team
Bronze medal – third place	1970 Bangkok	Men's doubles
Asian Championships
Gold medal – first place	1965 Lucknow	Men's doubles
Silver medal – second place	1965 Lucknow	Mixed doubles
Silver medal – second place	1965 Lucknow	Men's team
Bronze medal – third place	1969 Manila	Men's doubles
Bronze medal – third place	1962 Kuala Lumpur	Mixed doubles
Bronze medal – third place	1962 Kuala Lumpur	Men's team
Southeast Asian Games
Bronze medal – third place	1967 Bangkok	Men's doubles

Chavalert Chumkum was a former world-class badminton player who represented Thailand from the early 1960s to the early 1970s.

== Career ==
At a time when Thailand was known for its doubles specialists, Chumkum won more Thai national men's doubles titles than any other player of his era. His Thomas Cup (men's international team) record is particularly noteworthy. Participating in the '60-'61, '63-'64, and '69-'70 campaigns (Thailand declined to compete in '66-'67), Chumkum won 19 of the 23 doubles matches that he contested in ties (team matches) against Indonesia, Denmark, Malaysia, Japan, and India among other nations. He captured the men's doubles title at the 1965 Asian Badminton Championships with Narong Bhornchima. Touring internationally in 1968 he shared the Dutch Open and the Canadian Open men's doubles titles, and reached the All England Open men's doubles semifinal, with Sangob Rattanusorn.

== Achievements ==
=== Asian Games ===
Men's doubles
Year	Venue	Partner	Opponent	Score	Result
1970	Kittikachorn Stadium, Bangkok, Thailand	(Thailand) Pornchai Sakuntaniyom	(Japan) Junji Honma (Japan) Shoichi Toganoo	8–15, 8–15	Bronze

=== Asian Championships ===
Men's doubles
Year	Venue	Partner	Opponent	Score	Result
1965	Lucknow, India	(Thailand) Narong Bhornchima	(Malaysia) Tan Yee Khan (Thailand) Temshakdi Mahakonok	15–8, 15–10	Gold
1969	Manila, Philippines	(Thailand) Sangob Rattanusorn	(Malaysia) Ng Boon Bee (Malaysia) Punch Gunalan	7–15, 3–15	Bronze

Mixed doubles
Year	Venue	Partner	Opponent	Score	Result
1962	Stadium Negara, Kuala Lumpur, Malaysia	(Thailand) Pankae Phongarn	(Thailand) Chuchart Vatanatham (Thailand) Prathin Pattabongse	7–15, 10–15	Bronze
1965	Lucknow, India	(England) Ursula Smith	(Malaysia) Tan Yee Khan (England) Angela Bairstow	15–6, 3–15, 2–15	Silver

=== Southeast Asian Peninsular Games ===
Men's doubles
Year	Venue	Partner	Opponent	Score	Result
1967	Bangkok, Thailand	(Thailand) Sangob Rattanusorn	(Malaysia) Tan Yee Khan (Malaysia) Ng Boon Bee	11–15, 10–15	Bronze

=== International tournaments ===
Men's doubles
Year	Tournament	Partner	Opponent	Score	Result
1966	Malaysia Open	(Thailand) Sangob Rattanusorn	(Malaysia) Eddy Choong (Malaysia) Tan Aik Huang	14–17, 12–15	(silver) Runner-up
1968	Dutch Open	(Thailand) Sangob Rattanusorn	(Denmark) Erland Kops (Denmark) Tom Bacher	9–15, 15–1, 15–9	(gold) Winner
1968	German Open	(Thailand) Sangob Rattanusorn	(Malaysia) Tan Yee Khan (Malaysia) Ng Boon Bee	9–15, 2–15	(silver) Runner-up
1968	Canada Open	(Thailand) Sangob Rattanusorn	(Canada) Wayne Macdonnell (Canada) Rolf Paterson	15–12, 15–11	(gold) Winner
1968	Singapore Open	(Thailand) Sangob Rattanusorn	(Malaysia) Tan Yee Khan (Malaysia) Ng Boon Bee	9–15, 1–15	(silver) Runner-up
