= 1962 Asian Badminton Championships =

Badminton championships

Tournament details
- Dates: 21 April 1962 – 6 May 1962
- Venue: Stadium Negara
- Location: Kuala Lumpur, Malaysia

Champions
- Men's singles: (Federation of Malaya) Teh Kew San
- Women's singles: (Indonesia) Minarni
- Men's doubles: (Federation of Malaya) Ng Boon Bee (Federation of Malaya) Tan Yee Khan
- Women's doubles: (Indonesia) Happy Herowati (Indonesia) Corry Kawilarang
- Mixed doubles: (Federation of Malaya) Lim Say Hup (Federation of Malaya) Ng Mei Ling

The 1962 Asia Badminton Championships was the first tournament of the Badminton Asia Championships. It was held May 1962 in Kuala Lumpur, Malaysia.

== Medal summary ==
=== Medalists ===
Discipline	Gold	Silver	Bronze
Men's singles	(Federation of Malaya) Teh Kew San	(Federation of Malaya) Billy Ng	(Indonesia) Johnny Tjoa
Men's singles	(Federation of Malaya) Teh Kew San	(Federation of Malaya) Billy Ng	(Federation of Malaya) Yew Cheng Hoe
Women's singles	(Indonesia) Minarni	(Thailand) Sumol Chanklum	(Indonesia) Ong Hwat Nio
Women's singles	(Indonesia) Minarni	(Thailand) Sumol Chanklum	(Indonesia) Goei Kiok Nio
Men's doubles	(Federation of Malaya) Ng Boon Bee (Federation of Malaya) Tan Yee Khan	(Federation of Malaya) Teh Kew San (Federation of Malaya) Lim Say Hup	(Thailand) Sangob Rattanusorn (Thailand) Sanguan Anandhanonda
Men's doubles	(Federation of Malaya) Ng Boon Bee (Federation of Malaya) Tan Yee Khan	(Federation of Malaya) Teh Kew San (Federation of Malaya) Lim Say Hup	(Indonesia) Liem Tjeng Kiang (Indonesia) Tjap Han Tiong
Women's doubles	(Indonesia) Happy Herowati (Indonesia) Corry Kawilarang	(Thailand) Sumol Chanklum (Thailand) Pankae Phongarn	(Federation of Malaya) Jean Moey (Federation of Malaya) Ng Mei Ling
Women's doubles	(Indonesia) Happy Herowati (Indonesia) Corry Kawilarang	(Thailand) Sumol Chanklum (Thailand) Pankae Phongarn	(Indonesia) Minarni (Indonesia) Wiwiek Dwi Kaeksi
Mixed doubles	(Federation of Malaya) Lim Say Hup (Federation of Malaya) Ng Mei Ling	(Thailand) Chuchart Vatanatham (Thailand) Prathin Pattabongse	(Indonesia) Kho Han Tjiang (Indonesia) Corry Kawilarang
Mixed doubles	(Federation of Malaya) Lim Say Hup (Federation of Malaya) Ng Mei Ling	(Thailand) Chuchart Vatanatham (Thailand) Prathin Pattabongse	(Thailand) Chavalert Chumkum (Thailand) Pankae Phongarn
Men's team	Malaya; Billy Ng; Ng Boon Bee; Tan Yee Khan; Teh Kew San	Indonesia; Johnny Tjoa; Liem Tjeng Kiang; Tutang Djamaluddin; Abdul Patah Unang	Thailand; Sangob Rattanusorn; Sanguan Anandhanonda; Chuchart Vatanatham; Somsook Boonyasukhanonda
Men's team	Malaya; Billy Ng; Ng Boon Bee; Tan Yee Khan; Teh Kew San	Indonesia; Johnny Tjoa; Liem Tjeng Kiang; Tutang Djamaluddin; Abdul Patah Unang	Pakistan; Masood Khan; Naqi Mohsin; Wahajat Ali; Akram Baig

=== Medal table ===
* Host nation (Malaya)

Rank	Nation	Gold	Silver	Bronze	Total
1	Malaya	4	2	2	8
2	Indonesia	2	1	6	9
3	Thailand	0	3	3	6
4	Pakistan	0	0	1	1
Totals (4 entries)		6	6	12	24

== Men's singles ==
=== Finals ===
Quarter-finals
(Malaysia) Yew Cheng Hoe	15	16	15
(Thailand) Sangob Rattanusorn	12	17	12
(Malaysia) Billy Ng	15	15
(Pakistan) Masood Khan	3	4
(Indonesia) Mohamed Djundy	3	7
(Malaysia) Teh Kew San	15	15
(Indonesia) Ting Oen Hie
(Indonesia) Johnny Tjoa	w	/	o

Semi-finals
(Malaysia) Yew Cheng Hoe	12	12
(Malaysia) Billy Ng	15	15
(Malaysia) Teh Kew San	2	15	15
(Indonesia) Johnny Tjoa	15	4	7

Final
(Malaysia) Billy Ng	15	1	10
(Malaysia) Teh Kew San	7	15	15

=== Top half ===
==== Section 1 ====
First round

Second round
(Indonesia) Tan J H
(Malaysia) Yew C H	w	/	o
(Pakistan) A Baig	15	11	15
(Malaysia) S Tan	4	15	8
(Malaysia) Khoo E H	14	1
(Nepal) S B Basnyat	15	15
(Dominion of Ceylon) L R Ariyananda	2	2
(Indonesia) Ang T S	15	15

Third round
(Malaysia) Yew C H	15	15
(Pakistan) A Baig	1	6
(Nepal) S B Basnyat	3	1
(Indonesia) Ang T S	15	15

Fourth round
(Malaysia) Yew C H	15	15
(Indonesia) Ang T S	3	11

==== Section 2 ====
First round

Second round
(Philippines) M Cruz	9	4
(Hong Kong) Chu S W	15	15
(Dominion of Ceylon) V Sriskandarajah	7	7
(Crown Colony of Sarawak) Lim S Y	15	15
(Myanmar) K Myint	2	5
(Malaysia) Lai F Y	15	15
(Hong Kong) Kwok S W	4	2
(Thailand) S Rattanusorn	15	15

Third round
(Hong Kong) Chu S W	10	15	4
(Crown Colony of Sarawak) Lim S Y	15	5	15
(Malaysia) Lai F Y	13	10
(Thailand) S Rattanusorn	15	15

Fourth round
(Crown Colony of Sarawak) Lim S Y	11	7
(Thailand) S Rattanusorn	15	15

==== Section 3 ====
First round

Second round
(Pakistan) M Khan	15	15
(Malaysia) R Oon	11	3
(Nepal) R Raj	1	0
(Dominion of Ceylon) N Rasalingam	15	15
(Malaysia) M Sadali	15	15
(Crown Colony of North Borneo) F Raja	4	4
(Philippines) J Torres	4	3
(Pakistan) W Ali	15	15

Third round
(Pakistan) M Khan	15	15
(Dominion of Ceylon) N Rasalingam	5	4
(Malaysia) M Sadali	15	15
(Pakistan) W Ali	4	2

Fourth round
(Pakistan) M Khan	15	15
(Malaysia) M Sadali	11	7

==== Section 4 ====
First round
(Malaysia) Ng B O	w	/	o
Q	(Crown Colony of Sarawak) Sian L S
(Crown Colony of Sarawak) Hamdan H	3	8
(Malaysia) B Ng	15	15
(Dominion of Ceylon) S Chandrasena	5	4
(Thailand) S Boonyasukhanonda	15	15

Second round
(Malaysia) Lee K W	15	17
(Myanmar) S P Barua	6	15
(Malaysia) Tan Y K	15	15
(Crown Colony of North Borneo) G Chung	7	6
(Malaysia) Ng B O	11	12
(Taiwan) Lo M-f	15	15
(Malaysia) B Ng	15	1	15
(Thailand) S Boonyasukhanonda	12	15	14

Third round
(Malaysia) Lee K W	6	6
(Malaysia) Tan Y K	15	15
(Taiwan) Lo M-f	2	5
(Malaysia) B Ng	15	15

Fourth round
(Malaysia) B Ng	11	15	15
(Malaysia) Tan Y K	15	7	5

=== Bottom half ===
==== Section 5 ====
First round

Second round
(Malaysia) Ng B B	11	15	15
(Thailand) S Anandhanonda	15	7	7
(Indonesia) Liem T K	15	15
(Malaysia) Law T S	7	7
(Malaysia) Tan S H	15	15
(Crown Colony of North Borneo) Lai W M	1	5
(Indonesia) M Djundy	15	15
(Hong Kong) G Ma	3	4

Third round
(Malaysia) Ng B B	2	10
(Indonesia) Liem T K	15	15
(Indonesia) M Djundy	15	15
(Malaysia) Tan S H	7	6

Fourth round
(Indonesia) Liem T K	17	10	10
(Indonesia) M Djundy	14	15	15

==== Section 6 ====
First round

Second round
(Malaysia) Teh K S	15	15
(Indonesia) A Rosanda	2	12
(Malaysia) Ong T S	15	15
(Nepal) A N Rana	3	2
(Nepal) S Shamsher	1	2
(Malaysia) Lim W L	15	15
(Malaysia) Khoo K C	15	15
(Dominion of Ceylon) G Chandrasena	5	3

Third round
(Malaysia) Teh K S	15	15
(Malaysia) Ong T S	3	7
(Malaysia) Khoo K C	9	15	2
(Malaysia) Lim W L	15	6	15

Fourth round
(Malaysia) Teh K S	15	17
(Malaysia) Lim W L	5	16

==== Section 7 ====
First round

Second round
(Indonesia) Ting O H	15	15
(Malaysia) Chin W S	10	5
(Philippines) O Yanga	w	/	o
(Malaysia) Wee C S
(Malaysia) Khoo E C	w	/	o
(Philippines) C Co
(Philippines) A Yanga	15	6	15
(Taiwan) Huang L-e	6	15	7

Third round
(Indonesia) Ting O H	15	15
(Philippines) O Yanga	4	1
(Malaysia) Khoo E C	w	/	o
(Philippines) A Yanga

Fourth round
(Indonesia) Ting O H	w	/	o
(Malaysia) Khoo E C

==== Section 8 ====
First round
(Pakistan) N Mohsin	w	/	o
(Indonesia) F Sonneville
(Hong Kong) Wong Y O	8	5
(Philippines) C Hanny	15	15
(Malaysia) G Yap
(Indonesia) J Tjoa	w	/	o

Second round
(Thailand) C Chumkum	15	15
(Malaysia) Lee G C	9	6
(Crown Colony of Sarawak) Lim H S	7	1
(Malaysia) S Abdullah	15	15
(Pakistan) N Mohsin	15	15
(Philippines) C Hanny	3	6
(Indonesia) J Tjoa	15	15
(Taiwan) Ho W-m	2	0

Third round
(Thailand) C Chumkum	9	15	12
(Malaysia) S Abdullah	15	4	15
(Pakistan) N Mohsin	10	5
(Indonesia) J Tjoa	15	15

Fourth round
(Malaysia) S Abdullah	8	7
(Indonesia) J Tjoa	15	15

=== Qualification ===
Qualification round
	Score		Set 1	Set 2	Set 3
(Crown Colony of Sarawak) Sian Liang Siew	2–0	(Pakistan) K Salahuddin	15–3	15–3	

== Women's singles ==
=== Finals ===
Semi-finals
(Indonesia) Minarni	w	/	o
(Indonesia) Ong Hwat Nio
(Indonesia) Goei Kiok Nio	7	3
(Thailand) Sumol Chanklum	11	11

Final
(Indonesia) Minarni	11	11
(Thailand) Sumol Chanklum	7	3

=== Top half ===
==== Section 1 ====
First round

Second round
(Indonesia) Minarni	11	11
(Malaysia) Teoh S Y	0	5
(Indonesia) C Kawilarang	11	11
(Malaysia) Ho C Y	0	7

Quarter-finals
(Indonesia) Minarni	w	/	o
(Indonesia) C Kawilarang

==== Section 2 ====
First round
(Indonesia) Yap H	w	/	o
(Hong Kong) C Ho

Second round
(Indonesia) Ong H N	11	11
(Malaysia) Kok L Y	6	7
(Indonesia) Yap H	11	11
(Malaysia) S Tan	3	1

Quarter-finals
(Indonesia) Ong H N	12	6	11
(Indonesia) Yap H	9	11	5

=== Bottom half ===
==== Section 3 ====
First round
(Thailand) P Pattabongse
(Malaysia) Ng M L	w	/	o

Second round
(Indonesia) Goei K N	w	/	o
(Malaysia) R Loh
(Indonesia) R Koestijah	8	12	11
(Malaysia) Ng M L	11	10	6

Quarter-finals
(Indonesia) Goei K N	w	/	o
(Indonesia) R Koestijah

==== Section 4 ====
First round

Second round
(Thailand) S Chanklum	12	11
(Malaysia) A Keong	10	1
(Hong Kong) Cheng Y N
(Malaysia) J Moey	w	/	o

Quarter-finals
(Thailand) S Chanklum	3	11	11
(Malaysia) J Moey	11	0	2

== Men's doubles ==
=== Finals ===
Semi-finals
(Malaysia) Lim Say Hup (Malaysia) Teh Kew San	15	15
(Indonesia) Liem Tjeng Kiang (Indonesia) Tjap Han Tiong	5	4
(Malaysia) Ng Boon Bee (Malaysia) Tan Yee Khan	15	15
(Thailand) Sanguan Anandhanonda (Thailand) Sangob Rattanusorn	7	10

Final
(Malaysia) Lim Say Hup (Malaysia) Teh Kew San	9	10
(Malaysia) Ng Boon Bee (Malaysia) Tan Yee Khan	15	15

=== Top half ===
==== Section 1 ====
First round
(Malaysia) Lim S H (Malaysia) Teh K S	15	15
(Malaysia) Chin W S (Malaysia) Ong T S	5	7
(Thailand) S Boonyasukhanonda (Malaysia) Lim W L	15	15
(Dominion of Ceylon) A R L Wijesekera (Dominion of Ceylon) G Chandrasena	6	10
(Malaysia) Z Ibrahim (Malaysia) M Endin	15	15
(Dominion of Ceylon) L R Ariyananda (Malaysia) E Soon	8	5
(Pakistan) M Khan (Pakistan) W Ali	1	9
(Malaysia) Ong P L (Malaysia) G Yap	15	15

Second round
(Malaysia) Lim S H (Malaysia) Teh K S	15	15
(Thailand) S Boonyasukhanonda (Malaysia) Lim W L	4	1
(Malaysia) Z Ibrahim (Malaysia) M Endin	6	10
(Malaysia) Ong P L (Malaysia) G Yap	15	15

Quarter-finals
(Malaysia) Lim S H (Malaysia) Teh K S	15	15
(Malaysia) Ong P L (Malaysia) G Yap	4	7

==== Section 2 ====
First round
(Hong Kong) R Young (Hong Kong) L Sousae
(Indonesia) E Tjahya (Indonesia) Kho H T	w	/	o
(Malaysia) Yew C H (Malaysia) Tan S H	15	15
(Malaysia) A Piruz (Malaysia) Law T S	3	3
(Indonesia) Lim T K (Indonesia) Tjap H T	15	9	15
(Malaysia) J Kok (Malaysia) R Lim	11	15	12
(Thailand) C Vatanatham (Thailand) C Chumkum	15	13	15
(Taiwan) Lo M-f (Taiwan) Huang L-e	6	18	8

Second round
(Indonesia) E Tjahya (Indonesia) Kho H T	13	15	15
(Malaysia) Yew C H (Malaysia) Tan S H	15	9	11
(Indonesia) Lim T K (Indonesia) Tjap H T	15	8	15
(Thailand) C Vatanatham (Thailand) C Chumkum	12	15	9

Quarter-finals
(Indonesia) E Tjahya (Indonesia) Kho H T
(Indonesia) Lim T K (Indonesia) Tjap H T	w	/	o

=== Bottom half ===
==== Section 3 ====
First round
(Malaysia) Ng B B (Malaysia) Tan Y K	15	15
(Crown Colony of North Borneo) G Chung (Crown Colony of North Borneo) F Raja	3	7
(Dominion of Ceylon) S Chandrasena (Dominion of Ceylon) N Rasalingam
(Crown Colony of Sarawak) Lai W M (Crown Colony of Sarawak) R Tan	w	/	o
(Malaysia) Saw G C (Malaysia) Ong S K	15	11	15
(Malaysia) Chin F P (Malaysia) Lee K W	8	15	3
(Malaysia) B Chee (Malaysia) Khoo E H	15	15
(Crown Colony of Sarawak) Lim S Y (Crown Colony of Sarawak) Lim H S	3	4

Second round
(Malaysia) Ng B B (Malaysia) Tan Y K	15	15
(Crown Colony of Sarawak) Lai W M (Crown Colony of Sarawak) R Tan	5	7
(Malaysia) Saw G C (Malaysia) Ong S K	12	7
(Malaysia) B Chee (Malaysia) Khoo E H	15	15

Quarter-finals
(Malaysia) Ng B B (Malaysia) Tan Y K	15	15
(Malaysia) B Chee (Malaysia) Khoo E H	8	11

==== Section 4 ====
First round
(Myanmar) S P Barua (Myanmar) Myint H	15	15
(Hong Kong) G Ma (Hong Kong) Wong Y O	3	7
(Indonesia) T Djamaluddin (Indonesia) A P Unang	15	15
(Malaysia) P Gunalan (Malaysia) Khoo E C	5	1
(Malaysia) F A L Gonzaga (Malaysia) Mok Y W	15	15
(Dominion of Ceylon) S Schoorman (Dominion of Ceylon) V Sriskandarajah	4	10
(Malaysia) Lee G C (Malaysia) Lai F Y	12	4
(Thailand) S Anandhanonda (Thailand) S Rattanusorn	15	15

Second round
(Myanmar) S P Barua (Myanmar) Myint H	9	6
(Indonesia) T Djamaluddin (Indonesia) A P Unang	15	15
(Malaysia) F A L Gonzaga (Malaysia) Mok Y W	9	8
(Thailand) S Anandhanonda (Thailand) S Rattanusorn	15	15

Quarter-finals
(Indonesia) T Djamaluddin (Indonesia) A P Unang	4	8
(Thailand) S Anandhanonda (Thailand) S Rattanusorn	15	15

== Women's doubles ==
=== Finals ===
First round
(Malaysia) Ho Cheng Yoke (Malaysia) Sylvia Tan	10	15	15
(Hong Kong) Cheng Yin Ngan (Hong Kong) Cynder Ho	15	11	5

Quarter-finals
(Malaysia) Jean Moey (Malaysia) Ng Mei Ling	15	15
(Indonesia) Goei Kiok Nio (Indonesia) Ong Hwat Nio	12	5
(Indonesia) Corry Kawilarang (Indonesia) Yap Happy	15	15
(Malaysia) Ho Cheng Yoke (Malaysia) Sylvia Tan	7	8
(Thailand) Sumol Chanklum (Thailand) Pankae Phongarn	15	9	15
(Malaysia) Cecilia Samuel (Malaysia) Teoh Siew Yong	9	15	4
(Malaysia) Annie Keong (Malaysia) Kok Lee Ying
(Indonesia) Wiwiek Dwi Kaeksi (Indonesia) Minarni	w	/	o

Semi-finals
(Malaysia) Jean Moey (Malaysia) Ng Mei Ling	7	6
(Indonesia) Corry Kawilarang (Indonesia) Yap Happy	15	15
(Thailand) Sumol Chanklum (Thailand) Pankae Phongarn	15	9	15
(Indonesia) Wiwiek Dwi Kaeksi (Indonesia) Minarni	1	15	11

Final
(Indonesia) Corry Kawilarang (Indonesia) Yap Happy	16	15	15
(Thailand) Sumol Chanklum (Thailand) Pankae Phongarn	18	13	3

== Mixed doubles ==
=== Finals ===
First round
(Thailand) Somsook Boonyasukhanonda (Thailand) Sumol Chanklum	w	/	o
(Indonesia) Tutang Djamaluddin (Indonesia) Wiwiek Dwi Kaeksi
(Indonesia) Kho Han Tjiang (Indonesia) Corry Kawilarang	15	15
(Malaysia) Bobby Chee (Malaysia) Teoh Siew Yong	1	3
(Malaysia) Abdullah Piruz (Hong Kong) Cynder Ho	17	15	15
(Indonesia) Entab Tjahya (Indonesia) Ong Hwat Nio	18	6	11
(Thailand) Chavalert Chumkum (Thailand) Pankae Phongarn	15	15
(Malaysia) Ong Poh Lim (Malaysia) Sylvia Tan	9	12
(Indonesia) Abdul Patah Unang (Indonesia) Goei Kiok Nio	15	15
(Malaysia) Saw Guan Chye (Malaysia) Jean Moey	12	8

Quarter-finals
(Malaysia) Lim Say Hup (Malaysia) Ng Mei Ling	11	15	15
(Thailand) Somsook Boonyasukhanonda (Thailand) Sumol Chanklum	15	9	3
(Indonesia) Kho Han Tjiang (Indonesia) Corry Kawilarang	15	15
(Malaysia) Abdullah Piruz (Hong Kong) Cynder Ho	9	10
(Thailand) Chavalert Chumkum (Thailand) Pankae Phongarn	w	/	o
(Indonesia) Abdul Patah Unang (Indonesia) Goei Kiok Nio
(Malaysia) Ng Boon Bee (Malaysia) Rosy Loh	10	15	8
(Thailand) Chuchart Vatanatham (Thailand) Prathin Pattabongse	15	10	15

Semi-finals
(Malaysia) Lim Say Hup (Malaysia) Ng Mei Ling	15	15
(Indonesia) Kho Han Tjiang (Indonesia) Corry Kawilarang	3	4
(Thailand) Chavalert Chumkum (Thailand) Pankae Phongarn	12	2^{r}
(Thailand) Chuchart Vatanatham (Thailand) Prathin Pattabongse	15	0

Final
(Malaysia) Lim Say Hup (Malaysia) Ng Mei Ling	15	15
(Thailand) Chuchart Vatanatham (Thailand) Prathin Pattabongse	7	4
