= Lim Say Hup =

Malaysian badminton player (1935–2005)

Lim Say Hup 林世合
Personal information
- Born: 1935 Penang, British Malaya
- Died: September 2005 (aged 69–70) Manila, Philippines

Sport
- Country: Malaysia
- Sport: Badminton
- Handedness: Left
Medal record
Representing Malaysia
Men's badminton
Thomas Cup
Silver medal – second place	1958 Singapore	Team
Asian Championships
Gold medal – first place	1962 Kuala Lumpur	Mixed doubles
Gold medal – first place	1962 Kuala Lumpur	Men's team
Silver medal – second place	1962 Kuala Lumpur	Men's doubles

Lim Say Hup (1935–2005), was a Malaysian badminton player.

== Career ==
Lim won the All England Open Badminton Championships in the men's doubles with Teh Kew San in 1959.

He featured in the final of the 1958 Thomas Cup in addition to representing Malaysia in the Thomas Cup during 1961 and 1964.

Lim also won the Glasgow World Invitational, All-Canadian Championships, All-American Championships and Malaysian Open before retiring in 1964.

== Personal life ==
Lim received a BA with honours in history from University of Malaya in 1959, the same year he won the All England Championships. He worked for the Commerce and Industry Ministry, Esso and the Asian Development Bank in Manila.

== Death ==
Lim died in 2005 at his residence in Manila, Philippines. He was 70 years old.

== Achievements ==
=== Asian Championships ===
Men's doubles
Year	Venue	Partner	Opponent	Score	Result
1962	Stadium Negara, Kuala Lumpur, Malaysia	(Malaysia) Teh Kew San	(Malaysia) Ng Boon Bee (Malaysia) Tan Yee Khan	9–15, 10–15	Silver

Mixed doubles
Year	Venue	Partner	Opponent	Score	Result
1962	Stadium Negara, Kuala Lumpur, Malaysia	(Malaysia) Ng Mei Ling	(Thailand) Chuchart Vatanatham (Thailand) Prathin Pattabongse	15–7, 15–4	Gold

=== International tournaments ===
Men's doubles
Year	Tournament	Partner	Opponent	Score	Result
1954	Malaysia Open	(Malaysia) See Chin Leong	(Malaysia) Chan Kon Leong (Malaysia) Lim Kee Fong	10–15, 13–18	(silver) Runner-up
1957	Malaysia Open	(Malaysia) Teh Kew San	(Malaysia) Lai Fook Ying (Malaysia) F. A. L. Gonzaga	15–2, 15–5	(gold) Winner
1957	Singapore Open	(Malaysia) Johnny Heah	(Colony of Singapore) Ismail Marjan (Colony of Singapore) Ong Poh Lim	10–15, 15–4, 15–7	(gold) Winner
1958	Malaysia Open	(Malaysia) Johnny Heah	(Thailand) Kamal Sudthivanich (Thailand) Charoen Wattanasin	11–15, 11–15	(silver) Runner-up
1958	Singapore Open	(Malaysia) Johnny Heah	(Malaysia) Lim Say Wan (Colony of Singapore) Ong Poh Lim	15–9, 15–7	(gold) Winner
1959	All England Open	(Malaysia) Teh Kew San	(Denmark) Henning Borch (Denmark) Jørgen Hammergaard Hansen	15–12, 15–10	(gold) Winner
1959	Canadian Open	(Malaysia) Teh Kew San	(Thailand) Thanoo Khadjadbhye (Thailand) Charoen Wattanasin	10–15, 15–13, 15–13	(gold) Winner
1959	U.S. Open	(Malaysia) Teh Kew San	(United States) Joe Alston (United States) Wynn Rogers	15–5, 15–3	(gold) Winner
1959	Malaysia Open	(Malaysia) Teh Kew San	(Malaysia) Eddy Choong (Denmark) Erland Kops	15–11, 15–9	(gold) Winner
1960	All England Open	(Malaysia) Teh Kew San	(Denmark) Finn Kobberø (Denmark) Poul-Erik Nielsen	17–14, 3–15, 1–15	(silver) Runner-up
1960	Mexico International	(Malaysia) Teh Kew San	(United States) Joe Alston (United States) Manuel Armendariz	15–7, 15–4	(gold) Winner
1960	Malaysia Open	(Malaysia) Teh Kew San	(Indonesia) Tan King Gwan (Indonesia) Njoo Kiem Bie	6–15, 15–11, 15–6	(gold) Winner
1960	Canadian Open	(Malaysia) Teh Kew San	(Thailand) Charoen Wattanasin (Indonesia) Ferry Sonneville	15–8, 15–8	(gold) Winner
1963	Malaysia Open	(Malaysia) Teh Kew San	(Malaysia) Ng Boon Bee (Malaysia) Tan Yee Khan	17–14, 9–15, 7–15	(silver) Runner-up
1964	Malaysia Open	(Malaysia) Teh Kew San	(Malaysia) Ng Boon Bee (Malaysia) Tan Yee Khan	7–15, 7–15	(silver) Runner-up
1964	Singapore Open	(Malaysia) Tan Aik Huang	(Malaysia) Ng Boon Bee (Malaysia) Tan Yee Khan	12–15, 6–15	(silver) Runner-up

Mixed doubles
Year	Tournament	Partner	Opponent	Score	Result
1957	Malaysia Open	(Malaysia) Tan Gaik Bee	(Malaysia) Eddy Choong (Malaysia) Lim Kit Lin	15–3, 6–15, 15–12	(gold) Winner
1957	Singapore Open	(Colony of Singapore) Jessie Ong	(Colony of Singapore) Lau Teng Chuan (Colony of Singapore) Lau Hui Huang	15–13, 7–15, 18–16	(gold) Winner
1958	Malaysia Open	(Malaysia) Tan Gaik Bee	(Malaysia) Johnny Heah (Malaysia) Amy Heah	12–15, 15–4, 18–14	(gold) Winner
1958	Singapore Open	(Colony of Singapore) Jessie Ong	(Malaysia) Johnny Heah (Malaysia) Amy Heah	8–15, 15–10, 17–15	(gold) Winner
1959	Malaysia Open	(Malaysia) Tan Gaik Bee	(India) Nandu M. Natekar (Malaysia) Alice Lim	15–8, 15–3	(gold) Winner
1959	Singapore Open	(Colony of Singapore) Jessie Ong	(Colony of Singapore) Ong Poh Lim (Colony of Singapore) Nancy Lim	15–11, 18–14	(gold) Winner
1960	Mexico International	(United States) Mary Conner	(United States) Manuel Armendariz (United States) Mildred Sirwaitis	11–15, 12–15	(silver) Runner-up
1960	Malaysia Open	(Malaysia) Tan Gaik Bee	(Malaysia) Bobby Chee (Malaysia) Ng Mei Ling	17–14, 15–6	(gold) Winner

=== Invitational tournaments ===
Men's doubles
Year	Tournament	Partner	Opponent	Score	Result
1959	World Invitational Championships	(Malaysia) Teh Kew San	(Sweden) Berndt Dahlberg (Denmark) Jørgen Hammergaard Hansen	15–13, 18–15	Gold
