= Billy Ng =

Malaysian badminton player

Billy Ng 黄绍铭
Personal information
- Nickname: Billy the Kid
- Born: 1940 (age 85–86) Johor Bahru, Johor, British Malaya
- Years active: 1959-1967

Sport
- Country: Malaysia
- Sport: Badminton
- Coached by: Eddie Choong, Roland Ng & Ng Ngoh Tee
- Event: Men's singles
Medal record
Men's badminton
Representing Malaysia
Thomas Cup
Gold medal – first place	1967 Jakarta	Team
Asian Games
Silver medal – second place	1966 Bangkok	Men's team
Bronze medal – third place	1962 Jakarta	Men's team
Asian Championships
Gold medal – first place	1962 Kuala Lumpur	Men's team
Silver medal – second place	1962 Kuala Lumpur	Men's singles
Southeast Asian Games
Bronze medal – third place	1967 Bangkok	Men's singles

Datuk' Billy Ng (Chinese: 黄绍铭; born 1940) is a former Malaysian badminton player.

== Career ==
Ng was the son of Ng Ngoh Tee, who was of Teochew Chinese origin and represented Johor in Badminton championships during the 1920s and 1930s and his wife Mak Cheng Hai, who was a distant relative of another state badminton champion Wong Peng Soon. Billy made his first foray into badminton in August 1959 when he was crowned Malaysian Schoolboy Singles Champion. Then Billy was a student at the renowned Foon Yew High School, Johor Bahru. Later that month, Billy led the Malayan Combined Schools against the Indonesian Youth Team where Billy defeated Lin Dan's current coach Tang Xien Hu in straight sets 15–12 15–12.

Billy represented Malaysia & finished runner-up in the inaugural Asian Badminton Championship (ABC) in 1960. In 1964, Billy became the winner of the 1964 Malaysia Open. He was also a member of the victorious 1967 Thomas Cup team, and of the Malaysian men's team that won the silver in the 1966 Asian Games in Bangkok. Billy also won the Malaysian Open men's singles title in 1965. The Malaysian 1967 Thomas Cup team played in an extremely hostile home crowd at the Istora Senayan Stadium, Jakarta.

In 2007, he was inducted into the Olympic Council of Malaysia's Hall of Fame. Three years later in July 2010, Billy Ng was conferred Darjah Indera Mahkota Pahang (DIMP) which carries the title Dato'. In June 2023, Billy Ng and fellow 1967 Thomas Cup holders were conferred Panglima Jasa Negara (PJN) which carries the title Datuk at Istana Negara.

== Achievements ==
=== Asian Championships ===
Men's singles
Year	Venue	Opponent	Score	Result
1962	Stadium Negara, Kuala Lumpur, Malaysia	(Malaysia) Teh Kew San	15–7, 1–15, 10–15	Silver

=== Southeast Asian Peninsular Games ===
Men's singles
Year	Venue	Opponent	Score	Result
1967	Bangkok, Thailand	(Thailand) Sangob Rattanusorn	9–15, 6–15	Bronze

=== International tournaments ===
Men's singles
Year	Tournament	Opponent	Score	Result
1960	Singapore Open	(Malaysia) Khoo Eng Huah	9–15, 15–10, 15–2	(gold) Winner
1964	Malaysia Open	(Malaysia) Tan Aik Huang	4–15, 15–12, 15–10	(gold) Winner
1964	Singapore Open	(Malaysia) Khor Cheng Chye	15–6, 7–15, 15–5	(gold) Winner

Mixed doubles
Year	Tournament	Partner	Opponent	Score	Result
1966	Singapore Open	(Malaysia) Sylvia Ng	(Malaysia) Eddy Choong (Singapore) Lim Choo Eng	17–15, retired	(gold) Winner

== Honours ==
- Commander of the Order of Meritorious Service (PJN) – Datuk (2023).
- Darjah Indera Mahkota Pahang (DIMP) – Dato’ (2010).
