= Sangob Rattanusorn =

Thai badminton player (born 1943)

- Rattanusorn in 1963

Sport
- Sport: Badminton
Medal record
Men's badminton
Representing Thailand
Asian Games
Gold medal – first place	1966 Bangkok	Men's team
Bronze medal – third place	1970 Bangkok	Men's singles
Asian Championships
Silver medal – second place	1965 Lucknow	Men's singles
Bronze medal – third place	1962 Kuala Lumpur	Men's doubles
Bronze medal – third place	1965 Lucknow	Men's doubles
Bronze medal – third place	1969 Manila	Men's singles
Bronze medal – third place	1969 Manila	Men's doubles
SEAP Games
Gold medal – first place	1967 Bangkok	Men's singles
Gold medal – first place	1973 Singapore	Men's doubles
Silver medal – second place	1965 Kuala Lumpur	Men's singles
Bronze medal – third place	1967 Bangkok	Men's doubles

Sangob Rattanusorn (born 1943) is a Thai badminton player who won numerous titles and represented his country in team play from the early 1960s through the early 1970s.

== Career ==
A fine "all-arounder" (proficient in all three events: singles, men's doubles, and mixed doubles), Rattanusorn won eight Thai national singles titles between 1962 and 1970, and the Southeast Asian Peninsular singles title in 1967. Outside of Asia, his most significant victories came in doubles events. He shared the U.S. Open mixed doubles title with England's Margaret Barrand in 1963, and the Canadian Open mixed doubles title with the USA's Lois Alston in 1968. In 1968 he also won the Canadian Open and Dutch Open men's doubles titles, and reached the men's doubles semifinal at the All-England Championships with fellow countryman Chavalert Chumkum. Perhaps the best year in his badminton career, however, came toward the end of it in 1973, when he helped Thailand to a surprise victory over Malaysia in the Asian zone final of Thomas Cup before bowing to perennial champion Indonesia in the inter-zone ties.

== Achievements ==
=== Asian Games ===
Men's singles
Year	Venue	Opponent	Score	Result
1970	Kittikachorn Stadium, Bangkok, Thailand	(Malaysia) Punch Gunalan	17–18, 10–15	Bronze

=== Asian Championships ===
Men's singles
Year	Venue	Opponent	Score	Result
1965	Lucknow, India	(India) Dinesh Khanna	3–15, 11–15	Silver
1969	Manila, Philippines	(Indonesia) Muljadi	10–15, 3–15	Bronze

Men's doubles
Year	Venue	Partner	Opponent	Score	Result
1962	Stadium Negara, Kuala Lumpur, Malaysia	(Thailand) Sanguan Anandhanonda	(Malaysia) Tan Yee Khan (Malaysia) Ng Boon Bee	7–15, 10–15	Bronze
1965	Lucknow, India	(Thailand) Tuly Ulao	(Thailand) Temshakdi Mahakonok (Malaysia) Tan Yee Khan	12–15, 18–15, 8–15	Bronze
1969	Manila, Philippines	(Thailand) Chavalert Chumkum	(Malaysia) Punch Gunalan (Malaysia) Ng Boon Bee	7–15, 3–15	Bronze

=== SEAP Games ===
Men's singles
Year	Venue	Opponent	Score	Result
1965	Selangor Badminton Association Hall, Kuala Lumpur, Malaysia	(Malaysia) Tan Aik Huang	7–15, 15–7, 7–15	Silver
1967	Kittikachorn Stadium, Bangkok, Thailand	(Thailand) Somsook Boonyasukhanonda		Gold

Men's doubles
Year	Venue	Partner	Opponent	Score	Result
1967	Kittikachorn Stadium, Bangkok, Thailand	(Thailand) Chavalert Chumkum	(Malaysia) Ng Boon Bee (Malaysia) Tan Yee Khan	11–15, 10–15	Bronze
1973	Singapore Badminton Hall, Singapore	(Thailand) Bandid Jaiyen	(Malaysia) Punch Gunalan (Malaysia) Dominic Soong	15–10, 18–15	Gold

=== International tournaments ===
Men's singles
Year	Tournament	Opponent	Score	Result
1963	Malaysia Open	(Malaysia) Yew Cheng Hoe	9–15, 1–15	(silver) Runner-up

Men's doubles
Year	Tournament	Partner	Opponent	Score	Result
1966	Malaysia Open	(Thailand) Chavalert Chumkum	(Malaysia) Eddy Choong (Malaysia) Tan Aik Huang	14–17, 12–15	(silver) Runner-up
1968	Dutch Open	(Thailand) Chavalert Chumkum	(Denmark) Tom Bacher (Denmark) Erland Kops	9–15, 15–1, 15–9	(gold) Winner
1968	German Open	(Thailand) Chavalert Chumkum	(Malaysia) Ng Boon Bee (Malaysia) Tan Yee Khan	9–15, 2–15	(silver) Runner-up
1968	Canadian Open	(Thailand) Chavalert Chumkum	(Canada) Wayne Macdonnell (Canada) Rolf Paterson	15–12, 15–11	(gold) Winner
1968	Singapore Open	(Thailand) Chavalert Chumkum	(Malaysia) Ng Boon Bee (Malaysia) Tan Yee Khan	9–15, 1–15	(silver) Runner-up
1972	Denmark Open	(Thailand) Bandid Jaiyen	(Malaysia) Punch Gunalan (Malaysia) Ng Boon Bee	6–15, 6–15	(silver) Runner-up

Mixed doubles
Year	Tournament	Partner	Opponent	Score	Result
1963	U.S. Open	(England) Margaret Barrand	(United States) Joe Alston (United States) Lois Alston	18–16, 4–15, 15–12	(gold) Winner
1968	Canadian Open	(United States) Lois Alston	(Thailand) Channarong Ratanaseangsuang (United States) Tyna Barinaga	15–11, 15–7	(gold) Winner
1968	Singapore Open	(Thailand) Pachara Pattabongse	(Denmark) Svend Andersen (Japan) Noriko Takagi	8–15, 11–15	(silver) Runner-up
