= Teh Kew San =

Malaysian badminton player (1935–2026)

Datuk Teh Kew San PJN AMN
Personal information
- Born: 26 January 1935 Colony of Penang, Straits Settlements, British Malaya
- Died: 14 May 2026 (aged 91) Malaysia

Sport
- Country: Malaysia
- Sport: Badminton
- Handedness: Right
Medal record
Men's badminton
Representing Malaysia
Thomas Cup
Gold medal – first place	1967 Jakarta	Men's team
Silver medal – second place	1958 Singapore	Men's team
Asian Games
Gold medal – first place	1966 Bangkok	Mixed doubles
Silver medal – second place	1962 Jakarta	Men's singles
Silver medal – second place	1966 Bangkok	Men's team
Bronze medal – third place	1962 Jakarta	Men's team
Asian Championships
Gold medal – first place	1962 Kuala Lumpur	Men's singles
Gold medal – first place	1962 Kuala Lumpur	Men's team
Gold medal – first place	1965 Lucknow	Men's team
Silver medal – second place	1962 Kuala Lumpur	Men's doubles
Southeast Asian Games
Bronze medal – third place	1961 Rangoon	Men's singles

Datuk Teh Kew San (郑求山) PJN AMN (26 January 1935 – 14 May 2026) was a Malaysian badminton player who won national and international titles from the late 1950s to the mid-1960s.

== Career ==
An "all-rounder" (player competitive in all three events: singles, doubles, and mixed doubles), his greatest successes came in men's doubles with Lim Say Hup. They won a number of major international tournaments on three continents, most notably the prestigious All-England title in 1959. Kew San's singles titles included the Mexico City International in 1960 and the Asian Championship in 1962. Known for his agility and deft racket work, he was a member of four consecutive Malayan/Malaysian Thomas Cup teams (1958, 1961, 1964, 1967), captaining the last which captured the world team title.

== Personal life and death ==
Teh was born in Colony of Penang, Straits Settlements, Malaya on 26 January 1935. He married his national mixed doubles partner, Ng Mei Ling and they had two children, a son (Thomas) and a daughter (Karen).

On 14 May 2026, Teh died due to complications from a urinary tract infection. He was 91.

== Achievements ==
=== Asian Games ===
Men's singles
Year	Venue	Opponent	Score	Result
1962	Istora Senayan, Jakarta, Indonesia	(Indonesia) Tan Joe Hock	9–15, 3–15	Silver

Mixed doubles
Year	Venue	Partner	Opponent	Score	Result
1966	Kittikachorn Stadium, Bangkok, Thailand	(Malaysia) Rosalind Singha Ang	(Malaysia) Eddy Choong (Malaysia) Tan Gaik Bee	18–13, 11–15, 15–5	Gold

=== Asian Championships ===
Men's singles
Year	Venue	Opponent	Score	Result
1962	Stadium Negara, Kuala Lumpur, Federation of Malaya	(Malaysia) Billy Ng	7–15, 15–1, 15–10	Gold

Men's doubles
Year	Venue	Partner	Opponent	Score	Result
1962	Stadium Negara, Kuala Lumpur, Federation of Malaya	(Malaysia) Lim Say Hup	(Malaysia) Ng Boon Bee (Malaysia) Tan Yee Khan	9–15, 10–15	Silver

=== Southeast Asian Peninsular Games ===
Men's singles
Year	Venue	Opponent	Score	Result
1961	Rangoon, Burma	(Laos) Vondeune	Walkover	Bronze

=== International tournaments ===
Men's singles
Year	Tournament	Opponent	Score	Result
1958	Malaya Open	(Thailand) Charoen Wattanasin	9–15, 4–15	(silver) Runner-up
1959	Malaysia Open	(Thailand) Charoen Wattanasin	11–15, 12–15	(silver) Runner-up
1960	Mexico International	(Denmark) Finn Kobberø	15–7, 15–7	(gold) Winner
1963	Singapore Open	(Malaysia) Yew Cheng Hoe	11–15, 15–3, 15–1	(gold) Winner

Men's doubles
Year	Tournament	Partner	Opponent	Score	Result
1957	Malaya Open	(Malaysia) Lim Say Hup	(Malaysia) Lai Fook Ying (Malaysia) F.A.L. Gonzaga	15–2, 15–5	(gold) Winner
1959	All England	(Malaysia) Lim Say Hup	(Denmark) Henning Borch (Denmark) Jørgen Hammergaard Hansen	15–12, 15–10	(gold) Winner
1959	Canada Open	(Malaysia) Lim Say Hup	(Thailand) Thanoo Khadjadbhye (Thailand) Charoen Wattanasin	10–15, 15–13, 15–13	(gold) Winner
1959	US Open	(Malaysia) Lim Say Hup	(United States) Joe Alston (United States) Wynn Rogers	15–5, 15–3	(gold) Winner
1959	Malaya Open	(Malaysia) Lim Say Hup	(Malaysia) Eddy Choong (Denmark) Erland Kops	15–11, 15–9	(gold) Winner
1960	All England	(Malaysia) Lim Say Hup	(Denmark) Finn Kobberø (Denmark) Poul-Erik Nielsen	17–14, 3–15, 1–15	(silver) Runner-up
1960	Mexico International	(Malaysia) Lim Say Hup	(United States) Joe Alston (United States) Manuel Armendariz	15–7, 15–4	(gold) Winner
1960	Malaya Open	(Malaysia) Lim Say Hup	(Indonesia) Tan King Gwan (Indonesia) Njoo Kiem Bie	6–15, 15–11, 15–6	(gold) Winner
1960	Canada Open	(Malaysia) Lim Say Hup	(Thailand) Charoen Wattanasin (Indonesia) Ferry Sonneville	15–8, 15–8	(gold) Winner
1962	Malaya Open	(Malaysia) George Yap	(Malaysia) Ng Boon Bee (Malaysia) Tan Yee Khan	15–8, 15–4	(gold) Winner
1963	Malaya Open	(Malaysia) Lim Say Hup	(Malaysia) Ng Boon Bee (Malaysia) Tan Yee Khan	17–14, 9–15, 7–15	(silver) Runner-up
1963	Singapore Open	(Malaysia) George Yap	(Malaysia) Ng Boon Bee (Malaysia) Tan Yee Khan	11–15, 17–15, 6–15	(silver) Runner-up
1964	Malaysia Open	(Malaysia) Lim Say Hup	(Malaysia) Ng Boon Bee (Malaysia) Tan Yee Khan	7–15, 7–15	(silver) Runner-up
1966	Penang Open	(Malaysia) Yew Cheng Hoe	(Indonesia) Ang Tjin Siang (Indonesia) Rudy Nio	15–0, 15–0	(gold) Winner

Mixed doubles
Year	Tournament	Partner	Opponent	Score	Result
1962	Malaya Open	(Malaysia) Ng Mei Ling	(Malaysia) Ng Boon Bee (Malaysia) Tan Gaik Bee	15–11, 15–12	(gold) Winner
1965	Malaysia Open	(Malaysia) Ng Mei Ling	(Malaysia) Eddy Choong (Malaysia) Rosalind Singha Ang	15–10, 15–7	(gold) Winner
1968	Malaysia Open	(Malaysia) Ng Mei Ling	(Denmark) Svend Andersen (Sweden) Eva Twedberg	17–18, 13–15	(silver) Runner-up

=== Invitational Tournaments ===
Men's singles
Year	Tournament	Opponent	Score	Result
1959	World Invitational Championships	(Thailand) Charoen Wattanasin	1–15, 7–15	Silver

Men's doubles
Year	Tournament	Partner	Opponent	Score	Result
1959	World Invitational Championships	(Malaysia) Lim Say Hup	(Sweden) Berndt Dahlberg (Denmark) Jørgen Hammergaard Hansen	15–13, 18–15	Gold

== Honours ==
- Member of the Order of the Defender of the Realm (AMN) (1968).
- Commander of the Order of Meritorious Service (PJN) – Datuk (2023).
