= Ng Boon Bee =

Malaysian badminton player (1937–2022)

Ng Boon Bee 伍文美
Personal information
- Born: 17 December 1937 Ipoh, Perak, British Malaya
- Died: 3 August 2022 (aged 84) Ipoh, Perak, Malaysia
- Years active: 1960–1973

Sport
- Country: Malaysia
- Sport: Badminton
- Handedness: Right
- Event: Men's doubles & mixed doubles
Medal record
Men's badminton
Representing Malaysia
Thomas Cup
Gold medal – first place	1967 Jakarta	Men's team
Silver medal – second place	1970 Kuala Lumpur	Men's team
Commonwealth Games
Gold medal – first place	1970 Edinburgh	Men's doubles
Silver medal – second place	1966 Kingston	Men's doubles
Asian Games
Gold medal – first place	1962 Jakarta	Men's doubles
Gold medal – first place	1966 Bangkok	Men's doubles
Gold medal – first place	1970 Bangkok	Men's doubles
Gold medal – first place	1970 Bangkok	[Mixed doubles
Silver medal – second place	1966 Bangkok	Men's team
Bronze medal – third place	1962 Jakarta	Men's team
Bronze medal – third place	1970 Bangkok	Men's team
Asian Championships
Gold medal – first place	1962 Kuala Lumpur	Men's doubles
Gold medal – first place	1962 Kuala Lumpur	Men's team
Gold medal – first place	1969 Manila	Men's doubles
Silver medal – second place	1969 Manila	Men's team
SEAP Games
Gold medal – first place	1961 Rangoon	Men's doubles
Gold medal – first place	1965 Kuala Lumpur	Men's doubles]]
Gold medal – first place	1965 Kuala Lumpur	Men's team
Gold medal – first place	1965 Kuala Lumpur	Mixed doubles
Gold medal – first place	1967 Bangkok	Men's doubles
Gold medal – first place	1969 Rangoon	Mixed doubles
Gold medal – first place	1971 Kuala Lumpur	Men's doubles
Gold medal – first place	1971 Kuala Lumpur	Men's team
Silver medal – second place	1961 Rangoon	Mixed doubles
Silver medal – second place	1971 Kuala Lumpur	Mixed doubles
Bronze medal – third place	1967 Bangkok	Mixed doubles

Dato' Ng Boon Bee DPTJ AMN (Chinese: 伍文美; pinyin: Wǔ Wénměi; 17 December 1937 – 3 August 2022) was a Malaysian badminton player who excelled from the 1960s through the early 1970s. His success in doubles earned him recognition as one of greatest doubles players in badminton history.

== Early life ==
Ng started to play badminton when he was ten years inspired by his badminton-playing father. He was the third child from five siblings. His first success in badminton came in 1955 when he became Perak schoolboy champ in the singles and doubles. A year later, he won the Perak junior. He also excelled in all types of sports beside badminton such as athletics, tennis, rugby, and playing association football at the national level. It was some time in 1961 that he finally decided to concentrate on badminton.

== Career ==
During the 1960s, Ng and his partner, Tan Yee Khan formed one of the most successful men's doubles teams of the decade, winning most of the sport's biggest titles including the coveted All England, Asian Games and Asian Championships. Known for his quickness, power, and anticipation, Ng was a member of the Malaysian squad that won the 1967 Thomas Cup, in a 6–3 controversial victory over Indonesia at the Istora Senayan Stadium.

After Yee Khan retired in 1969, Ng formed a successful partnership with Punch Gunalan. One of their biggest achievements was beating Indonesia's combination of Rudy Hartono/Indra Gunawan in the 1971 All-England final. There were other accomplishments too, including winning the 1970 Bangkok Asian Games and 1970 Commonwealth Games in Edinburgh.

== Personal life ==
Ng was married to Tong Yee Cheng. Together they had 2 children – Gillian and Thomas. Thomas was named after the prestigious Thomas Cup.

== Death ==
On 3 August 2022, Ng died at the Raja Permaisuri Bainun Hospital due to aneurysm.

== Awards ==
- 1968 Malaysia's Sportsman of the Year
- He was inducted into the World Badminton Hall of Fame in 1998.
- Olympic Council of Malaysia's (OCM) Hall of Fame 2015.

== Honours ==
- Member of the Order of the Defender of the Realm (A.M.N.) (1972).
- Commander of the Order of Meritorious Service (PJN) – Datuk (2023).
- Knight Commander of the Grand Order of Tuanku Ja’afar (D.P.T.J.) – Dato' (2008).

== Achievements ==
=== Olympic Games (demonstration) ===
Men's doubles
Year	Venue	Partner	Opponent	Score	Result
1972	Volleyballhalle, Munich, West Germany	(Malaysia) Punch Gunalan	(Indonesia) Ade Chandra (Indonesia) Christian Hadinata	4–15, 15–2, 11–15	Silver

=== Commonwealth Games ===
Men's doubles
Year	Venue	Partner	Opponent	Score	Result
1966	Convention Hall, Kingston, Jamaica	(Malaysia) Tan Yee Khan	(Malaysia) Tan Aik Huang (Malaysia) Yew Cheng Hoe	14–15, 5–15	Silver
1970	Meadowbank Stadium, Edinburgh, Scotland	(Malaysia) Punch Gunalan	(Malaysia) Ng Tat Wai (Malaysia) Tan Soon Hoi	15–3, 15–3	Gold

=== Asian Games ===
Men's doubles
Year	Venue	Partner	Opponent	Score	Result
1962	Istora Senayan, Jakarta, Indonesia	(Malaysia) Tan Yee Khan	(Indonesia) Liem Tjeng Kiang (Indonesia) Tan Joe Hok	15–13, 18–17	Gold
1966	Kittikachorn Stadium, Bangkok, Thailand	(Malaysia) Tan Yee Khan	(Indonesia) Ang Tjin Siang (Indonesia) Tjoa Tjong Boan	12–15, 15–8, 18–16	Gold
1970	Kittikachorn Stadium, Bangkok, Thailand	(Malaysia) Punch Gunalan	(Japan) Junji Honma (Japan) Shoichi Toganoo	5–15, 15–8, 15–7	Gold

Mixed doubles
Year	Venue	Partner	Opponent	Score	Result
1970	Kittikachorn Stadium, Bangkok, Thailand	(Malaysia) Sylvia Ng	(Thailand) Bandid Jaiyen (Thailand) Achara Pattabongs	18–13, 11–15, 15–10	Gold

=== Asian Championships ===
Men's doubles
Year	Venue	Partner	Opponent	Score	Result
1962	Stadium Negara, Kuala Lumpur, Malaysia	(Malaysia) Tan Yee Khan	(Malaysia) Lim Say Hup (Malaysia) Teh Kew San	15–9, 15–10	Gold
1969	Rizal Stadium, Manila, Philippines	(Malaysia) Punch Gunalan	(Japan) Yukinori Hori (Japan) Ippei Kojima	15–8, 5–15, 15–11	Gold

=== SEAP Games ===
Men's doubles
Year	Venue	Partner	Opponent	Score	Result
1961	Aung San National Indoor Stadium, Rangoon, Burma	(Malaysia) Tan Yee Khan	(Thailand) Narong Bhornchima (Thailand) Raphi Kanchanaraphi	15–8, 6–15, 15–10	Gold
1965	Selangor Badminton Hall, Kuala Lumpur, Malaysia	(Malaysia) Tan Yee Khan	(Thailand) Narong Bhornchima (Thailand) Raphi Kanchanaraphi	15–8, 15–11	Gold
1967	Kittikachorn Stadium, Bangkok, Thailand	(Malaysia) Tan Yee Khan	(Thailand) Narong Bhornchima (Thailand) Raphi Kanchanaraphi	15–7, 15–8	Gold
1971	Stadium Negara, Kuala Lumpur, Malaysia	(Malaysia) Punch Gunalan	(Malaysia) Ho Khim Kooi (Malaysia) Ng Tat Wai	15–10, 15–10	Gold

Mixed doubles
Year	Venue	Partner	Opponent	Score	Result
1961	Aung San National Indoor Stadium, Rangoon, Burma	(Malaysia) Ng Mei Ling	(Thailand) Raphi Kanchanaraphi (Thailand) Pankae Phongam	18–14, 8–15, 9–15	Silver
1965	Selangor Badminton Hall, Kuala Lumpur, Malaysia	(Malaysia) Teh Siew Yong	(Malaysia) Tan Yee Khan (Malaysia) Rosalind Singha Ang	15–11, 15–5	Gold
1967	Kittikachorn Stadium, Bangkok, Thailand	(Malaysia) Teh Siew Yong	(Thailand) Chirasak Champakao (Thailand) Sumol Chanklum	6–15, 10–15	Bronze
1969	Aung San National Indoor Stadium, Rangoon, Myanmar	(Malaysia) Rosalind Singha Ang	(Malaysia) Yew Cheng Hoe (Malaysia) Khaw Gaik Bee	17–18, 18–17, retired	Gold
1971	Stadium Negara, Kuala Lumpur, Malaysia	(Malaysia) Rosalind Singha Ang	(Malaysia) Ng Tat Wai (Malaysia) Teh Mei Ling	Walkover	Silver

=== International tournaments ===
Men's doubles
Year	Tournament	Partner	Opponent	Score	Result
1961	Malaysia Open	(Malaysia) Tan Yee Khan	(Malaysia) George Yap (Singapore) Ong Poh Lim	18–15, 15–3	(gold) Winner
1962	Malaysia Open	(Malaysia) Tan Yee Khan	(Malaysia) Teh Kew San (Malaysia) George Yap	8–15, 4–15	(silver) Runner-up
1963	Malaysia Open	(Malaysia) Tan Yee Khan	(Malaysia) Teh Kew San (Malaysia) Lim Say Hup	14–17, 15–9, 15–7	(gold) Winner
1963	Singapore Open	(Malaysia) Tan Yee Khan	(Malaysia) Teh Kew San (Malaysia) George Yap	15–11, 15–17, 15–6	(gold) Winner
1964	Malaysia Open	(Malaysia) Tan Yee Khan	(Malaysia) Teh Kew San (Malaysia) Lim Say Hup	15–7, 15–7	(gold) Winner
1964	Singapore Open	(Malaysia) Tan Yee Khan	(Malaysia) Tan Aik Huang (Malaysia) Lim Say Hup	15–12, 15–6	(gold) Winner
1965	All England Open	(Malaysia) Tan Yee Khan	(Denmark) Erland Kops (Malaysia) Oon Chong Jin	15–7, 15–5	(gold) Winner
1965	Malaysia Open	(Malaysia) Tan Yee Khan	(Malaysia) Khor Cheng Chye (Malaysia) Lee Guan Chong	15–4, 15–5	(gold) Winner
1965	Singapore Open	(Malaysia) Tan Yee Khan	(Malaysia) Khor Cheng Chye (Malaysia) Lee Guan Chong	15–8, 17–14	(gold) Winner
1966	Denmark Open	(Malaysia) Tan Yee Khan	(Malaysia) Tan Aik Huang (Malaysia) Yew Cheng Hoe	15–13, 15–10	(gold) Winner
1966	All England Open	(Malaysia) Tan Yee Khan	(Denmark) Finn Kobberø (Denmark) Jørgen Hammergaard Hansen	9–15, 15–9, 17–15	(gold) Winner
1966	Canadian Open	(Malaysia) Tan Yee Khan	(Denmark) Svend Pri (Malaysia) Yew Cheng Hoe	12–15, 15–1, 17–14	(gold) Winner
1966	U.S. Open	(Malaysia) Tan Yee Khan	(United States) Don Paup (United States) Jim Poole	15–6, 15–12	(gold) Winner
1967	Singapore Open	(Malaysia) Tan Yee Khan	(Indonesia) Indratno (Indonesia) Mintarja	15–3, 15–8	(gold) Winner
1967	Denmark Open	(Malaysia) Tan Yee Khan	(Denmark) Svend Pri (Denmark) Per Walsøe	8–15, 18–16, 17–15	(gold) Winner
1967	Malaysia Open	(Malaysia) Tan Yee Khan	(Indonesia) Indratno (Indonesia) Mintarja	15–9, 15–10	(gold) Winner
1968	All England Open	(Malaysia) Tan Yee Khan	(Denmark) Henning Borch (Denmark) Erland Kops	6–15, 4–15	(silver) Runner-up
1968	Malaysia Open	(Malaysia) Tan Yee Khan	(Japan) Ippei Kojima (Japan) Issei Nichino	11–15, 15–9, 15–9	(gold) Winner
1968	Singapore Open	(Malaysia) Tan Yee Khan	(Thailand) Chavalert Chumkum (Thailand) Sangob Rattanusorn	15–9, 15–1	(gold) Winner
1968	German Open	(Malaysia) Tan Yee Khan	(Thailand) Chavalert Chumkum (Thailand) Sangob Rattanusorn	15–9, 15–2	(gold) Winner
1969	U.S. Open	(Malaysia) Punch Gunalan	(Japan) Ippei Kojima (Thailand) Channarong Ratanaseangsuang	15–3, 15–7	(gold) Winner
1969	Singapore Pesta	(Malaysia) Punch Gunalan	(Indonesia) Indratno (Indonesia) Mintarja	15–5, 15–5	(gold) Winner
1971	Poona Open	(Malaysia) Punch Gunalan	(Malaysia) Lee Kok Pheng (Malaysia) Lim Shook Kong	15–4, 15–5	(gold) Winner
1971	German Open	(Malaysia) Punch Gunalan	(Germany) Roland Maywald (Germany) Willi Braun	15–12, 15–8	(gold) Winner
1971	Denmark Open	(Malaysia) Punch Gunalan	(Indonesia) Rudy Hartono (Indonesia) Indra Gunawan	11–15, 15–4, 15–8	(gold) Winner
1971	All England	(Malaysia) Punch Gunalan	(Indonesia) Rudy Hartono (Indonesia) Indra Gunawan	15–5, 15–3	(gold) Winner
1971	Canadian Open	(Malaysia) Punch Gunalan	(Thailand) Raphi Kanchanaraphi (Thailand) Channarong Ratanaseangsuang	15–10, 15–11	(gold) Winner
1971	U.S. Open	(Malaysia) Punch Gunalan	(United States) Don Paup (United States) Jim Poole	2–15, 18–13, 15–7	(gold) Winner
1972	Denmark Open	(Malaysia) Punch Gunalan	(Thailand) Bandid Jaiyen (Thailand) Sangob Rattanusorn	15–6, 15–6	(gold) Winner
1972	Poona Open	(Malaysia) Punch Gunalan	(Malaysia) Abdul Rahman Mohamad (Malaysia) Ng Tat Wai	10–15, 15–8, 15–8	(gold) Winner
1972	German Open	(Malaysia) Punch Gunalan	(England) Elliot Stuart (England) Derek Talbot	15–9, 15–12	(gold) Winner
1972	Singapore Open	(Malaysia) Punch Gunalan	(Malaysia) Tan Aik Huang (Malaysia) Tan Aik Mong	11–15, retired	(silver) Runner-up

Mixed doubles
Year	Tournament	Partner	Opponent	Score	Result
1962	Malaysia Open	(Malaysia) Tan Gaik Bee	(Malaysia) Teh Kew San (Malaysia) Ng Mei Ling	11–15, 12–15	(silver) Runner-up
1966	Canadian Open	(Denmark) Ulla Strand	(United States) Don Paup (United States) Helen Tibbetts	15–10, 15–9	(gold) Winner
1967	Singapore Open	(Malaysia) Rosalind Singha Ang	(Indonesia) Darmadi (Indonesia) Minarni	4–15, 5–15	(silver) Runner-up
1969	Canadian Open	(Indonesia) Retno Koestijah	(Indonesia) Darmadi (Indonesia) Minarni	5–15, 15–17	(silver) Runner-up
1970	Singapore Open	(Malaysia) Sylvia Ng	(Thailand) Chirasak Champakao (Thailand) Pachara Pattabongse	15–11, 15–12	(gold) Winner
1971	Poona Open	(Malaysia) Sylvia Ng	(Netherlands) Joke van Beusekom (Netherlands) Piet Ridder	15–4, 15–5	(gold) Winner
1971	Canadian Open	(Malaysia) Sylvia Ng	(Canada) Rolph Patterson (Canada) Mimi Nilsson	15–11, 15–4	(gold) Winner
1971	Singapore Open	(Malaysia) Sylvia Ng	(Thailand) Thongkam Kingmanee (Thailand) Bandid Jaiyen	15–6, 15–9	(gold) Winner
