= Tan Yee Khan =

Malaysian badminton player (1940–2026)

Tan Yee Khan 陈贻权
Personal information
- Born: 24 September 1940 Ipoh, Perak, Federated Malay States (now Malaysia)
- Died: 26 January 2026 (aged 85) Ipoh, Perak, Malaysia
- Years active: 1961–1969

Sport
- Country: Malaysia
- Sport: Badminton
Medal record
Representing Malaysia
Men's badminton
Thomas Cup
Gold medal – first place	1967 Jakarta	Team
Commonwealth Games
Silver medal – second place	1966 Kingston	Men's doubles
Asian Games
Gold medal – first place	1962 Jakarta	Men's doubles
Gold medal – first place	1966 Bangkok	Men's doubles
Silver medal – second place	1966 Bangkok	Men's team
Bronze medal – third place	1962 Jakarta	Men's team
Asian Championships
Gold medal – first place	1962 Kuala Lumpur	Men's doubles
Gold medal – first place	1962 Kuala Lumpur	Men's team
Gold medal – first place	1965 Lucknow	Men's team
Gold medal – first place	1965 Lucknow	Mixed doubles
Silver medal – second place	1965 Lucknow	Men's doubles
Bronze medal – third place	1965 Lucknow	Men's singles
Southeast Asian Games
Gold medal – first place	1961 Rangoon	Men's doubles
Gold medal – first place	1965 Kuala Lumpur	Men's doubles
Gold medal – first place	1965 Kuala Lumpur	Men's team
Gold medal – first place	1967 Bangkok	Men's doubles
Silver medal – second place	1965 Kuala Lumpur	Mixed doubles

Tan Yee Khan PJN DPMP AMN (simplified Chinese: 陈贻权; traditional Chinese: 陳貽權; pinyin: Chén Yíquán; 24 September 1940 – 26 January 2026) was a Malaysian badminton player who represented his country in badminton events around the world during the 1960s.

== Career ==
Though capable of high-level singles (he won Japan's "World Invitational" tourney in 1964 and ousted Erland Kops in the first round of the 1966 All Englands), Yee Khan was primarily a doubles player who won numerous major international titles in partnership with Ng Boon Bee. Powerfully built and substantially bigger than most Asian players of his day, he was reputed to be the hardest smasher in the game. He won the coveted All-England men's doubles title with Boon Bee consecutively in 1965 and 1966. In 1967 he was a member of Malaysia's world champion Thomas Cup (men's international) team. Plagued by back problems he retired from badminton competition in 1969 but soon became one of Malaysia's leading golfers. He was elected to the World Badminton Hall of Fame in 1998.

== Death ==
Tan Yee Khan died on 26 January 2026, at the age of 85. His wake would be held at the VCare Memorial Centre and his cremation rite proceed to take place at the Papan Memorial Park Crematorium in Ipoh, Perak.

== Achievements ==
=== Asian Games ===
Men's doubles
Year	Venue	Partner	Opponent	Score	Result
1962	Istora Senayan, Jakarta, Indonesia	(Malaysia) Ng Boon Bee	(Indonesia) Tan Joe Hock (Indonesia) Liem Tjeng Kiang	15–13, 18–17	Gold
1966	Kittikachorn Stadium, Bangkok, Thailand	(Malaysia) Ng Boon Bee	(Indonesia) Ang Tjin Siang (Indonesia) Tjoe Tjong Boon	12–15, 15–8, 18–16	Gold

=== Asian Championships ===
Men's singles
Year	Venue	Opponent	Score	Result
1965	Lucknow, India	(Thailand) Sangob Rattanusorn	15–12, 13–15, 1–15	Bronze

Men's doubles
Year	Venue	Partner	Opponent	Score	Result
1962	Stadium Negara, Kuala Lumpur, Malaysia	(Malaysia) Ng Boon Bee	(Malaysia) Teh Kew San (Malaysia) Lim Say Hup	15–9, 15–10	Gold
1965	Lucknow, India	(Thailand) Temshakdi Mahakonok	(Thailand) Narong Bhornchima (Thailand) Chavalert Chumkum	8–15, 10–15	Silver

Mixed doubles
Year	Venue	Partner	Opponent	Score	Result
1965	Lucknow, India	(England) Angela Bairstow	(England) Ursula Smith (Thailand) Chavalert Chumkum	6–15, 15–3, 15–2	Gold

=== Southeast Asian Peninsular Games ===
Men's doubles
Year	Venue	Partner	Opponent	Score	Result
1961	Yangon, Myanmar	(Malaysia) Ng Boon Bee	(Thailand) Narong Bhornchima (Thailand) Raphi Kanchanaraphi	15–8, 6–15, 15–10	Gold
1965	Selangor Badminton Hall, Kuala Lumpur, Malaysia	(Malaysia) Ng Boon Bee	(Thailand) Narong Bhornchima (Thailand) Raphi Kanchanaraphi	15–8, 15–11	Gold
1967	Bangkok, Thailand	(Malaysia) Ng Boon Bee	(Thailand) Narong Bhornchima (Thailand) Raphi Kanchanaraphi	15–7, 15–8	Gold

Mixed doubles
Year	Venue	Partner	Opponent	Score	Result
1965	Selangor Badminton Hall, Kuala Lumpur, Malaysia	(Malaysia) Rosalind Singha Ang	(Malaysia) Ng Boon Bee (Malaysia) Teh Siew Yong	11–15, 5–15	Silver

=== Commonwealth Games ===
Men's doubles
Year	Venue	Partner	Opponent	Score	Result
1966	Kingston, Jamaica	(Malaysia) Ng Boon Bee	(Malaysia) Tan Aik Huang (Malaysia) Yew Cheng Hoe	14–15, 5–15	Silver

=== International tournaments ===
Men's doubles
Year	Tournament	Partner	Opponent	Score	Result
1961	Malaysia Open	(Malaysia) Ng Boon Bee	(Malaysia) George Yap (Singapore) Ong Poh Lim	18–15, 15–3	(gold) Winner
1961	Singapore Open	(Singapore) Ong Poh Lim	(Singapore) Robert Lim (Singapore) Lim Wei Lon	9–15, 15–11, 12–15	(silver) Runner-up
1962	Malaysia Open	(Malaysia) Ng Boon Bee	(Malaysia) Teh Kew San (Malaysia) George Yap	8–15, 4–15	(silver) Runner-up
1963	Malaysia Open	(Malaysia) Ng Boon Bee	(Malaysia) Teh Kew San (Malaysia) Lim Say Hup	14–17, 15–9, 15–7	(gold) Winner
1963	Singapore Open	(Malaysia) Ng Boon Bee	(Malaysia) Teh Kew San (Malaysia) George Yap	15–11, 15–17, 15–6	(gold) Winner
1964	Malaysia Open	(Malaysia) Ng Boon Bee	(Malaysia) Teh Kew San (Malaysia) Lim Say Hup	15–7, 15–7	(gold) Winner
1964	Singapore Open	(Malaysia) Ng Boon Bee	(Malaysia) Tan Aik Huang (Malaysia) Lim Say Hup	15–12, 15–6	(gold) Winner
1965	All England	(Malaysia) Ng Boon Bee	(Denmark) Erland Kops (Malaysia) Oon Chong Jin	15–7, 15–5	(gold) Winner
1965	Malaysia Open	(Malaysia) Ng Boon Bee	(Malaysia) Khor Cheng Chye (Malaysia) Lee Guan Chong	15–4, 15–5	(gold) Winner
1965	Singapore Open	(Malaysia) Ng Boon Bee	(Malaysia) Khor Cheng Chye (Malaysia) Lee Guan Chong	15–8, 17–14	(gold) Winner
1966	Denmark Open	(Malaysia) Ng Boon Bee	(Malaysia) Tan Aik Huang (Malaysia) Yew Cheng Hoe	15–13, 15–10	(gold) Winner
1966	All England	(Malaysia) Ng Boon Bee	(Denmark) Finn Kobberø (Denmark) Jørgen Hammergaard Hansen	9–15, 15–9, 17–15	(gold) Winner
1966	Canadian Open	(Malaysia) Ng Boon Bee	(Denmark) Svend Pri (Malaysia) Yew Cheng Hoe	12–15, 15–1, 17–14	(gold) Winner
1966	U.S. Open	(Malaysia) Ng Boon Bee	(United States) Don Paup (United States) Jim Poole	15–6, 15–12	(gold) Winner
1966	Singapore Open	(Malaysia) Khor Cheng Chye	(Malaysia) Eddy Choong (Malaysia) Yew Cheng Hoe	13–15, 15–8, 2–15	(silver) Runner-up
1967	Singapore Open	(Malaysia) Ng Boon Bee	(Indonesia) Indratno (Indonesia) Mintarja	15–3, 15–8	(gold) Winner
1967	Denmark Open	(Malaysia) Ng Boon Bee	(Denmark) Svend Pri (Denmark) Per Walsøe	8–15, 18–16, 17–15	(gold) Winner
1967	Malaysia Open	(Malaysia) Ng Boon Bee	(Indonesia) Indratno (Indonesia) Mintarja	15–9, 15–10	(gold) Winner
1968	All England	(Malaysia) Ng Boon Bee	(Denmark) Henning Borch (Denmark) Erland Kops	6–15, 4–15	(silver) Runner-up
1968	Malaysia Open	(Malaysia) Ng Boon Bee	(Japan) Ippei Kojima (Japan) Issei Nichino	11–15, 15–9, 15–9	(gold) Winner
1968	Singapore Open	(Malaysia) Ng Boon Bee	(Thailand) Sangob Rattanusorn (Thailand) Chavalert Chumkum	15–9, 15–1	(gold) Winner
1968	German Open	(Malaysia) Ng Boon Bee	(Thailand) Sangob Rattanusorn (Thailand) Chavalert Chumkum	15–9, 15–2	(gold) Winner
1968	Northern Indian	(Malaysia) Punch Gunalan	(Indonesia) Rudy Hartono (Indonesia) Indratno	15–3, 6–15, 7–15	(silver) Runner-up

Mixed doubles
Year	Tournament	Partner	Opponent	Score	Result
1966	Perak Open	(Indonesia) Retno Koestijah	(Malaysia) Eddy Choong (Indonesia) Minarni	15–9, 15–11	(gold) Winner

== Honours ==
- Member of the Order of the Defender of the Realm (A.M.N.) (1972).
- Commander of the Order of Meritorious Service (P.J.N.) – Datuk (2023).
- Knight Commander of the Order of the Perak State Crown (D.P.M.P.) – Dato' (2007).
