= 1963 Uber Cup squads =

This article lists the squads for the 1963 Uber Cup participating teams. The age listed for each player is on 1 April 1963 which was the first day of the tournament.

== Teams ==
=== Canada ===
Six players represented Canada in the 1963 Uber Cup.

Name	DoB/Age
Marjory Shedd	17 March 1926 (aged 37)
Patricia Espley	1945 (aged 17–18)
Jean Miller	1935 (aged 27–28)
Dorothy Tinline	25 December 1921 (aged 41)
Beverley Chittick	1939 (aged 24–25)
Sharon Whittaker	1942 (aged 20–21)

=== England ===
Six players represented England in the 1963 Uber Cup.

Name	DoB/Age
Angela Bairstow	31 May 1942 (aged 20)
Ursula Smith	25 October 1942 (aged 20)
Iris Rogers	1930 (aged 32–33)
Brenda Parr	1938 (aged 24–25)
Jenny Pritchard	1938 (aged 24–25)
Margaret Barrand	1940 (aged 22–23)

=== Indonesia ===
Five players represented Indonesia in the 1963 Uber Cup.

Name	DoB/Age
Minarni	10 May 1944 (aged 18)
Retno Koestijah	19 June 1942 (aged 20)
Happy Herowati	1935 (aged 27–28)
Corry Kawilarang	1935 (aged 27–28)
Goei Kiok Nio	1939 (aged 23–24)

=== New Zealand ===
Five players represented New Zealand in the 1963 Uber Cup.

Name	DoB/Age
Val Gow	8 March 1929 (aged 34)
Gilda Tompkins	7 August 1936 (aged 26)
Margaret Moorhead	1935 (aged 27–28)
Gaynor Simpson	1945 (aged 17–18)
Nancy Fleming	1911 (aged 49–50)

=== United States ===
Six players represented the United States in the 1963 Uber Cup.

Name	DoB/Age
Judy Hashman	22 October 1935 (aged 27)
Helen McGregor Stewart	7 April 1938 (aged 24)
Dorothy O'Neil	5 September 1930 (aged 32)
Carlene Starkey	1940 (aged 22–23)
Tyna Barinaga	1946 (aged 16–17)
Caroline Jensen	1946 (aged 16–17)
