= Indonesian National Badminton Championships =

The Indonesian National Badminton Championships or officially known as the Kejuaraan Nasional PBSI is a tournament organized by the Badminton Association of Indonesia (PBSI) to crown the best badminton players in Indonesia.

== Past winners ==
=== Seniors ===
Although the organizing body, Indonesian Badminton Federation (Persatuan Bulutangkis Seluruh Indonesia), was founded on 5 May 1951, the 1952 and 1953 championships are not recorded in the official handbooks of the International Badminton Federation.

Year	Men's singles	Women's singles	Men's doubles	Women's doubles	Mixed doubles	Ref
1952	Ferry Sonneville	Ong Hong Nio				
1953		Ong Hong Nio		Teng Koen Liong; Tio Siam Tie		
1954	Eddy Yusuf	Teng Koen Liong	Gauw Soen Lok; Gan Kay Hoe	Oei Lin Nio; Rosnida Nasution	Njoo Kim Bie; Teng Koen Liong	
1955	Eddy Yusuf	Yang Weng Ching	Lay Tjie Sing; Kwie Hian Soe	Ong Hong Nio; Goei Ing Nio	Tjioe Wie Hong; Theng Liem Hwa	
1956	Tan Joe Hock	Yang Weng Ching	Ghan Khay Houw; Gouw Soen Lok	Teng Koen Liong; Tio Siam Tie	Tjioe Wie Hong; Theng Liem Hwa	
1958	Tan Joe Hock	Oei Lin Nio	Tan Joe Hock; Lie Poo Djian	Corry Kawilarang; Thio Koen Eng	Zainal Abidin; Corry Kawilarang	
1959	Lie Poo Djian	Minarni	Tan King Gwan; Njoo Kiem Bie	Corry Kawilarang; Rosnida Nasution	Zainal Abidin; Corry Kawilarang	
1960	Eddy Yusuf	Minarni	Tan Yee Khan; Ng Boon Bee	Oei Lin Nio; Corry Kawilarang	Zainal Abidin; Corry Kawilarang	
1963	Ang Tjin Siang	Minarni	Tan King Gwan; Njoo Kim Bie	Retno Kustijah; Minarni	Zainal Abidin; Corry Kawilarang	
1964	Ang Tjin Siang	Minarni	Tutang Djamaluddin; Liem Tjeng Kiang	Retno Kustijah; Minarni		
1967	Muljadi	Minarni	Tan Joe Hock; A. P. Unang	Retno Kustijah; Minarni		
1968	Darmadi	Utami Dewi	Muljadi; Mintarja	Poppy Tumengkol; Nurhaena		
1969	Darmadi	Utami Dewi		Utami Dewi; Minarni		
1971	Iie Sumirat	Utami Dewi	Christian Hadinata; Atik Jauhari			
1972	Djaliteng	Utami Dewi	Tjun Tjun; Johan Wahjudi	Utami Dewi; Minarni		
1973		Utami Dewi				
1974	Liem Swie King	Taty Sumirah	Tjun Tjun; Johan Wahjudi	Minarni; Retno Kustijah	Verawaty Wiharjo	
1975	Liem Swie King	Utami Dewi				
1976	Triaji	Verawaty Wiharjo				
1978	Hadiyanto		Liem Swie King; Hariamanto Kartono			
1980	Kurniahu	Ho Gai Jing	Icuk Sugiarto			
1981						
1982	Kurniahu					
1983	Icuk Sugiarto	Ivanna Lie				
1984	Icuk Sugiarto					
1985	Icuk Sugiarto					
1986	Icuk Sugiarto					
1987	Icuk Sugiarto	Kho Mei Hwa				
1991	Hariyanto Arbi	Yuni Kartika	Reony Mainaky; Nunung Mudijanto	Catherine; Eliza Nathanael	Aryono Miranat; Eliza Nathanael	
1993	Alan Budikusuma	Susi Susanti	Antonius Ariantho; Denny Kantono	Finarsih; Lili Tampi	Aryono Miranat; Rosalina Riseu	
1995	Nunung Subandoro	Yuni Kartika	Sigit Budiarto; Dicky Purwotjugiono	Indarti Issolina; Deyana Lomban	Sandiarto; Anastasia Rosalia	
1997	George Rimarcdi	Mia Audina	Candra Wijaya; Sigit Budiarto	Eliza Nathanael; Zelin Resiana	Trikus Heryanto; Zelin Resiana	
1999	Ignatius Rudy	Ninik Masrikah	Hermono Yuwono / Andreas or Ade Lukas / Santoso Sugiharjo	Vita Marissa; Mona Santoso	Santoso Sugiharjo; Eny Widiowati	
2001	Sony Dwi Kuncoro	Atu Rosalina	Candra Wijaya; Sigit Budiarto	Minarti Timur; Vita Marissa	Bambang Suprianto; Emma Ermawati	
2003	Andre Kurniawan Tedjono	Yuli Marfuah	Imam Sodikin; Davis Efraim	Greysia Polii; Heni Budiman	Imam Sodikin; Monica	
2005	Andre Kurniawan Tedjono	Silvi Antarini	Yoga Ukikasah; Yonathan Suryatama Dasuki	Nitya Krishinda Maheswari; Nadya Melati	Bambang Suprianto; Leyliana Daisy Chandra	
2007	Taufik Hidayat	Aprilia Yuswandari	Luluk Hadiyanto; Alvent Yulianto	Greysia Polii; Jo Novita	Nova Widianto; Liliyana Natsir	
2009	Sony Dwi Kuncoro	Maria Kristin Yulianti	Markis Kido; Hendra Setiawan	Greysia Polii; Meiliana Jauhari	Tontowi Ahmad; Greysia Polii	
2011	Senatria Agus Setia Putra	Ganis Nur Rahmadani	Rahmat Adianto; Berry Angriawan	Suci Rizki Andini; Della Destiara Haris	Riky Widianto; Richi Puspita Dili	
2013	Simon Santoso	Maziyyah Nadhir	Hardianto; Agripinna Prima Rahmanto Putra	Komala Dewi; Meiliana Jauhari	Alfian Eko Prasetya; Shendy Puspa Irawati	
2015	Jonatan Christie	Fitriani	Angga Pratama; Ricky Karanda Suwardi	Della Destiara Haris; Rosyita Eka Putri Sari	Rafiddias Akhdan Nugroho; Vita Marissa	
2017	Wisnu Yuli Prasetyo	Ruselli Hartawan	Mohammad Ahsan; Hendra Setiawan	Tania Oktaviani Kusumah; Vania Arianti Sukoco	Akbar Bintang Cahyono; Winny Oktavina Kandow	
2019	Christian Adinata	Asty Dwi Widyaningrum	Amri Syahnawi; M. Fachrikar P. Mansur	Della Destiara Haris; Rizki Amelia Pradipta	Adnan Maulana; Mychelle Crhystine Bandaso	
2023	Halim As Sidiq	Fitriani	Akbar Bintang Cahyono; Bobby Setiabudi	Anggia Shitta Awanda; Putri Larasati	Bobby Setiabudi; Melati Daeva Oktavianti	
2025	Muhammad Rizky Akbar	Aisyah Sativa Fatetani	Erwin Rendana Purnomo; Ade Yusuf Santoso	Isyana Syahira Meida; Rinjani Kwinnara Nastine	Bobby Setiabudi; Melati Daeva Oktavianti	

=== Juniors ===
Year	Boys' singles	Girls' singles	Boys' doubles	Girls' doubles	Mixed doubles	Ref
1991	Dwi Aryanto	Mia Audina	Cun Cun Haryono; Victo Wibowo	Fenny Natalia; Henny Novitalia	E. Dadan Hidayat; Emma Ermawati	
1993	Budi Santoso	Ellen Angelina	Davis Efraim; Halim Haryanto	Andi Andriana; Grac Diana	Santoso; Iin Indarwati	
1995	Ignatius Rudy	Juli	Idrus Irham; Indra Mulyajaya	Upi Chrisnawati; Cynthia Tuwankotta	Indra Mulyajaya; Upi Chrisnawati	
1997	Hartawan	Hanny Setiani	Doni Prasetyo; Denny Setiawan	Rosie Riani; Yenny Aryani	Denny Setiawan; Rosie Riani	
1999	Agung Kuncoro	Dian Novita Sari	Hendra Aprida Gunawan; Bambang Saifulloh or Asyking; Enroe	Dian Novita Sari; Endang Nursugianti	Asyking; Endang Nursugianti	
2000	Ardiansyah	Dian Novita Sari	Yusuf Ahmad; Robby Istantio	Devi Sukma Wijaya; Rani Mundiasti	Hendra Aprida Gunawan; Lina Marlina	
2001	Holvy de Pauw	Maria Kristin Yulianti	Hendra Setiawan; Joko Riyadi	Liliyana Natsir; Natalia Poluakan	Hendra Setiawan; Greysia Polii	
2002	Andre Kurniawan Tedjono	Fransisca Ratnasari	Ujang Suherlan; Yoga Ukikasah	Purwati; Meiliana Jauhari	Muhammad Rijal; Meiliana Jauhari	
2003	Alamsyah Yunus	Wiwis Meilyanna	Fran Kurniawan; Kowi Chandra	Pia Zebadiah Bernadet; Nitya Krishinda Maheswari	Fran Kurniawan; Yulianti	
2004	Andre Kurniawan Tedjono	Pia Zebadiah Bernadet	Aditya Dwi Putra; I Made Agung	Pia Zebadiah Bernadet; Nitya Krishinda Maheswari	Lingga Lie; Yulianti	
2005	Achmad Rivai	Bellaetrix Manuputty	Rio Willianto; Davin Prawidssa	Lily Siswanti; Shendy Puspa Irawati	Abdul Rahmansyah; Richi Puspita Dili	
2006	Andi Saputra Nugroho	Sylvinna Kurniawan	Danny Bawa Chrisnanta; Afiat Yuris Wirawan	Bellaetrix Manuputty; Samantha Lintang	Danny Bawa Chrisnanta; Debby Susanto	
2007	Nandang Arif Saputro	Lindaweni Fanetri	Budi Hartono; Yohanes Rendy Sugiarto	Anneke Feinya Agustin; Wenny Setiawati	Wifqi Windarto; Debby Susanto	
2008	Hermansyah	Ana Rovita	Didit Juang Indrianto; Seiko Wahyu Kusdianto	Suci Rizki Andini; Tiara Rosalia Nuraidah	Irfan Fadhilah; Weni Anggraini	
2009	Riyanto Subagja	Ana Rovita	Jones Ralfy Jansen; Dandi Prabudita	Ayu Pratiwi; Anggie Widia Setiawan	Didit Juang Indrianto; Yayu Rahayu	
2010	Shesar Hiren Rhustavito	Ganis Nur Rahmadani	Jones Ralfy Jansen; Dandi Prabudita	Aris Budiharti; Dian Fitriani	Jones Ralfy Jansen; Nurbeta Kwanrico	
2011	Fikri Ihsandi Hadmadi	Hanna Ramadini	Kenas Adi Haryanto; Sigid Sudrajad	Anggia Shitta Awanda; Shella Devi Aulia	Edi Subaktiar; Gloria Emanuelle Widjaja	
2012	Ihsan Maulana Mustofa	Ruselli Hartawan	Kevin Sanjaya Sukamuljo; Rafiddias Akhdan Nugroho	Melati Daeva Oktavianti; Rosyita Eka Putri Sari	Edi Subaktiar; Melati Daeva Oktavianti	
2013	Eska Rivan Jaya	Gregoria Mariska Tunjung	Clinton Hendrik Kudamassa; Muhammad Rian Ardianto	Della Augustia Surya; Uswatun Khasanah	Fajar Alfian; Inten Ratnasari	
2014	Krishna Adi Nugraha	Erlina Kurnianti	Angger Sudrajad; Tedi Supriadi	Marsheilla Gischa Islami; Rahmadhani Hastiyanti Putri	Jeka Wiratama; Marsheilla Gischa Islami	
2015	Vega Vio Nirwanda	Desandha Vegarani Putri	M. Fachrikar Adma P.M. Muhammad Reza Pahlevi Isfahani	Mychelle Crhystine Bandaso; Serena Kani	Rinov Rivaldy; Vania Arianti Sukoco	
2016	Ramadhani M. Zulkifli	Ghaida Nurul Ghaniyu	Bagas Maulana; Calvin Kristanto	Febriana Dwipuji Kusuma; Ribka Sugiarto	Yeremia Rambitan; Winny Oktavina Kandow	
2017	Ikhsan Rumbay	Alya Rahma Mulyani	Alfandy Rizki Putra Kasturo; Emanuel Randhy Febryto	Febby Valencia Dwijayanti Gani; Lisa Ayu Kusumawati	Renaldi Samosir; Hediana Julimarbela	
2018	Karono Suwarno	Alifia Intan Nurrokhim	Syahrizal Dafandi Arafixqli; Syahrozi Dafandi Arafixqli	Amalia Cahaya Pratiwi; Rayhan Vania Salsabila	Andre Timotius Tololiu; Dinda Dwi Cahyaning	
2019	Tegar Sulistio	Nandini Putri Arumni	Rayhan Fadillah; Rahmat Hidayat	Jesita Putri Miantoro; Putri Larasati	Teges Satriaji Cahyo Hutomo; Lanny Tria Mayasari	
2022	Halim As Sidiq	Wening Arviani Sabrina	Muhammad Fadel Illyasa Duni; Yahya Raska Ananda Suprianto	Ariella Naqiyyah; Rachel Agnesia Sabatini	Verrell Yustin Mulia; Priskila Venus Elsadai	
2023	Zaki Ubaidillah	Azzahra Melani Arjisetya	Dexter Farrell; Wahyu Agung Prasetyo	Isyana Syahira Meida; Rinjani Kwinnara Nastine	Kleopas Prakoso; Rachel Agnesia Sabatini	
2025	Nashrulloh Al-Habsyi	Oei Louisa Jovanka Sandi Winarto	Akmal Nurrahman; Revand Harianto	Adelia Nirul; Salsabila Zahra Aulia	Ikhsan Lintang Pramudya; Salsabila Zahra Aulia	

=== Team events ===
==== Mixed team ====
Year	Winner	Runner-up
1990	PB Pelita Jaya	PB Djarum Kudus
1992	PB Pelita Jaya	PB Djarum Kudus
1994	PB Bimantara Tangkas	PB Djarum Kudus
1996	PB Jaya Raya Jakarta	PB Bimantara Tangkas
1998	PB Djarum Kudus	PB Suryanaga Surabaya
2000	PB Jaya Raya Jakarta	PB Djarum Kudus
2002	PB Tangkas	PB Jaya Raya Jakarta
2004	PB SGS Elektrik	PB Suryanaga
2006	PB Jaya Raya Jakarta	PB Tangkas
2008	PB Tangkas	PB Djarum Kudus
2010	PB Djarum Kudus	PB Tangkas
2012	PB Jaya Raya Jakarta	PB Djarum Kudus
2014	PB Jaya Raya Jakarta	PB Djarum Kudus
2016	PB Djarum Kudus	PB Jaya Raya Jakarta
2018	PB Jaya Raya Jakarta	PB Mutiara Cardinal Bandung
2022	PB Jaya Raya Jakarta	PB Mansion Exist Jakarta

==== Men's and women's team ====
Year	Men's team		Women's team	
Year	Winner	Runner-up	Winner	Runner-up
1982	PB Djarum Kudus		PB Jaya Raya Jakarta	
1986	PB Djarum Kudus	PB Bimantara Tangkas	PB Bimantara Tangkas	PB Jaya Raya Jakarta
1988	PB Djarum Kudus	PB Bimantara Tangkas	PB Bimantara Tangkas	
