= 1966 Uber Cup squads =

This article lists the squads for the 1966 Uber Cup participating teams. The age listed for each player is on 14 May 1966 which was the first day of the tournament.

== Teams ==
=== Canada ===
Five players represented Canada in the 1966 Uber Cup.

Name	DoB/Age
Marjory Shedd	17 March 1926 (aged 40)
Jean Miller	1935 (aged 30–31)
Dorothy Tinline	25 December 1921 (aged 44)
Jean Folinsbee	1937 (aged 28–29)
Sharon Whittaker	1942 (aged 23–24)

=== England ===
Five players represented England in the 1966 Uber Cup.

Name	DoB/Age
Angela Bairstow	31 May 1942 (aged 23)
Ursula Smith	25 October 1942 (aged 23)
Iris Rogers	1930 (aged 35–36)
Jenny Pritchard	1938 (aged 27–28)
Margaret Barrand	1940 (aged 22–23)

=== Indonesia ===
Six players represented Indonesia in the 1966 Uber Cup.

Name	DoB/Age
Minarni	10 May 1944 (aged 22)
Retno Koestijah	19 June 1942 (aged 23)
Corry Kawilarang	29 May 1939 (aged 26)
Megah Idawati	27 July 1945 (aged 20)
Megah Inawati	22 September 1943 (aged 22)
Tan Tjung Ing	22 November 1947 (aged 18)

=== Japan ===
Six players represented New Zealand in the 1966 Uber Cup.

Name	DoB/Age
Noriko Takagi	30 May 1943 (aged 22)
Fumiko Yokoi	1940 (aged 25–26)
Mitsuko Yokoyama	1940 (aged 25–26)
Kazuko Gotō	28 January 1946 (aged 20)
Hiroe Amano	November 1943 (aged 22)
Tomoko Takahashi	1945 (aged 20–21)

=== United States ===
Five players represented the United States in the 1966 Uber Cup.

Name	DoB/Age
Judy Hashman	22 October 1935 (aged 30)
Tyna Barinaga	1946 (aged 19–20)
Caroline Jensen	1946 (aged 19–20)
Janice DeZort	1948 (aged 17–18)
Rosine Jones	1936 (aged 29–30)
