= Indonesia national badminton team =

Team representing Indonesia in international badminton team competitions

Indonesia
- Association: Badminton Association of Indonesia (PBSI)
- Confederation: Badminton Asia
- Chairman: Muhammad Fadil Imran

BWF ranking
- Current ranking: 4 (6 October 2026)
- Highest ranking: 1 (4 August 1992)

Sudirman Cup
- Appearances: 17 (first in 1989)
- Best result: Champions (1989)

Thomas Cup
- Appearances: 31 (first in 1958)
- Best result: Champions (1958, 1961, 1964, 1970, 1973, 1976, 1979, 1984, 1994, 1996, 1998, 2000, 2002, 2020)

Uber Cup
- Appearances: 28 (first in 1963)
- Best result: Champions (1975, 1994, 1996)

Asian Mixed Team Championships
- Appearances: 4 (first in 2017)
- Best result: Champions (2025)

Asian Men's Team Championships
- Appearances: 12 (first in 1962)
- Best result: Champions (1969, 1971, 1976, 1993, 2016, 2018, 2020)

Asian Women's Team Championships
- Appearances: 4 (first in 2016)
- Best result: Champions (2022)

The Indonesia National Badminton Team (Indonesian: Tim Nasional Bulutangkis Indonesia) represents Indonesia in international badminton team competitions and is controlled by the Badminton Association of Indonesia, the governing body for badminton in Indonesia. Indonesia is one of the only two countries beside China who has won all badminton disciplines in the Olympic Games.

The Indonesian team has not been absent from the Thomas Cup tournament (world men's team championship) since it first entered and won the competition in 1958. The Indonesia men's team has participated in Thomas Cup 30 times, won the title 14 times and never failed to qualify for inter-zone competition. Indonesia has played in the decisive final tie on 22 occasions and once failed to place among the top four teams in 2012.

The Indonesia women's team has participated in Uber Cup 27 times, won the title 3 times and once failed to qualify in 2006. Indonesia has played in the decisive final tie on 11 occasions.

The Indonesia mixed team has won Sudirman Cup once in 1989. Indonesia has played in the decisive final tie on 7 occasions.

== Championships medal summary ==
=== Individual ===
Tournaments	Gold	Silver	Bronze	Total
BWF Tournaments
Summer Olympics	8	6	8	22
BWF World Championships^{[1]}	23	20	37	80
Badminton World Cup^{[2]}	36	31	46	113
World Games^{[3]}	0	0	3	3
Asian Games^{[a]}	23	19	34	76
Badminton Asia Championships^{[a]}	35	31	80	146
BWF Junior Tournaments
Summer Youth Olympics	0	0	1	1
BWF World Junior Championships^{[a]}	13	33	49	95
Asian Youth Games^{[a]}	1	0	1	2
Badminton Asia Junior Championships^{[a]}	14	6	43	63
BWF Senior Tournaments
BWF World Senior Championships	21	8	13.5	42.5
Non BWF Tournaments
Southeast Asian Games^{[a]}	122	83	48	232
Islamic Solidarity Games^{[a]}	0	1	6	7
GANEFO^{[a]}	3	0	1	4

- BWF Grade 1 (S-Tier) Tournament
- BWF Grade 2 (A-Tier) Tournament
- BWF Junior Grade 1 (S-Tier) Tournament
- BWF Junior Grade 2 (A-Tier) Tournament

Notes
^1 – The BWF World Championships, formerly known as IBF World Championships, and also known as the World Badminton Championships.
^2 – Badminton World Cup was suspended since 1997. However, the BWF revived the event in 2005 (with China as host) but only as an invitational tournament.
^3 – Badminton was introduced and only played at the 1981 World Games and became an Olympic sport at the 1992 Summer Olympics.
^a – Does not include team medals.

=== Team ===
Tournaments	Team	Gold	Silver	Bronze	Total
Thomas Cup	M	14	7	7	28
Uber Cup	W	3	8	5	16
Sudirman Cup	X	1	6	7	14
Badminton Asia Championships^{[1]}	M	4	3	2	9
Badminton Asia Team Championships	M	3	1	0	4
Badminton Asia Team Championships	W	1	0	2	3
Badminton Asia Mixed Team Championships	X	1	0	1	2
Suhandinata Cup^{[2]}	X	2	3	5	10
Badminton Asia Junior Team Championships	M	2	2	4	8
Badminton Asia Junior Team Championships	W	0	2	4	6
Badminton Asia Junior Team Championships	X	0	3	7	10
Asian Games	M	6	4	4	14
Asian Games	W	1	4	6	11
Southeast Asian Games	M	18	4	1	23
Southeast Asian Games	W	14	5	4	23
Islamic Solidarity Games	M	0	1	0	1
Islamic Solidarity Games	W	0	1	0	1
GANEFO	M	1	0	0	1
GANEFO	W	0	1	0	1

Notes
^1 – Asian badminton team championships exclusively for Men's team were conducted together with Asian Badminton Championships (now Badminton Asia Championships) until 1993 after which the team tournament stopped altogether and replaced by the Badminton Asia Team Championships in 2016.
^2 – The Suhandinata Cup is also known as the BWF World Junior Mixed Team Championships.

== Participation in Summer Olympic Games ==
As of the 2024 Summer Olympics

=== Medals table ===
Badminton at Summer Olympics all time medal table-Indonesia
Events		Gold	Silver	Bronze	Total
MS	Men's singles	2	2	3	7
WS	Women's singles	1	1	3	5
MD	Men's doubles	3	1	2	6
WD	Women's doubles	1	0	0	1
XD	Mixed doubles	1	2	0	3
Total		8	6	8	22

=== Medalist ===
Games	Events				
Games	MS	WS	MD	WD	XD
1992 Barcelona	(gold) Alan Budikusuma; (silver) Ardy Wiranata; (bronze) Hermawan Susanto	(gold) Susi Susanti	(silver) Eddy Hartono, Rudy Gunawan	—N/a	—N/a
1996 Atlanta	—N/a	(silver) Mia Audina; (bronze) Susi Susanti	(gold) Rexy Mainaky, Ricky Subagja; (bronze) Antonius Ariantho, Denny Kantono	—N/a	—N/a
2000 Sydney	(silver) Hendrawan	—N/a	(gold) Tony Gunawan, Candra Wijaya	—N/a	(silver) Tri Kusharjanto, Minarti Timur
2004 Athens	(gold) Taufik Hidayat; (bronze) Sony Dwi Kuncoro	—N/a	(bronze) Eng Hian, Flandy Limpele	—N/a	—N/a
2008 Beijing	—N/a	(bronze) Maria Kristin Yulianti	(gold) Hendra Setiawan, Markis Kido	—N/a	(silver) Nova Widianto, Liliyana Natsir
2012 London	—N/a	—N/a	—N/a	—N/a	—N/a
2016 Rio de Janeiro	—N/a	—N/a	—N/a	—N/a	(gold) Tontowi Ahmad, Liliyana Natsir
2020 Tokyo	(bronze) Anthony Sinisuka Ginting	—N/a	—N/a	(gold) Greysia Polii, Apriyani Rahayu	—N/a
2024 Paris	—N/a	(bronze) Gregoria Mariska Tunjung	—N/a	—N/a	—N/a

== Participation in World Games ==
Badminton was introduced and only played at the 1981 World Games.

=== Medals table ===
Badminton at World Games all time medal table-Indonesia
Events		Gold	Silver	Bronze	Total
MS	Men's singles	0	0	1	1
WS	Women's singles	0	0	0	0
MD	Men's doubles	0	0	1	1
WD	Women's doubles	0	0	0	0
XD	Mixed doubles	0	0	1	1
Total		0	0	3	3

=== Medalist ===
Year	Events				
Year	MS	WS	MD	WD	XD
1981	(bronze) Liem Swie King	—N/a	(bronze) Hariamanto Kartono, Rudy Heryanto	—N/a	(bronze) Imelda Wiguna, Christian Hadinata

== Participation in World Badminton Championships ==
The BWF World Championships (formerly known as IBF World Championships, also known as the World Badminton Championships) is a badminton tournament sanctioned by Badminton World Federation (BWF). The tournament started in 1977 and was held once every three years until 1983. Since 1985, the tournament became biennial and played once every two years until 2005. Starting 2006, the tournament was changed to an annual event on the BWF calendar. The tournament is not held during the Summer Olympics years to avoid schedule conflicts.

=== Medals table ===
As of 2025 BWF World Championships

World Badminton Championships all time medal table-Indonesia
Events		Gold	Silver	Bronze	Total
MS	Men's singles	6	7	13	26
WS	Women's singles	2	2	5	9
MD	Men's doubles	10	6	10	26
WD	Women's doubles	0	3	5	8
XD	Mixed doubles	5	2	5	12
Total		23	20	38	81

== Participation in Badminton World Cup ==
The World Cup in badminton was an annual tournament that was held from 1979 to 1997. After the tournament ceased for seven years, BWF decided to bring it back as an invitational tournament in 2005, but it was ended after the 2006 event.

=== Medals table ===
Badminton World Cup all time medal table-Indonesia
Events		Gold	Silver	Bronze	Total
MS	Men's singles	10	7	12	29
WS	Women's singles	6	5	10	21
MD	Men's doubles	10	7	7	24
WD	Women's doubles	2	6	10	18
XD	Mixed doubles	8	6	7	21
Total		36	31	46	113

=== Medalist ===
Year	Events				
Year	MS	WS	MD	WD	XD
1979	(gold) Liem Swie King; (silver) Iie Sumirat	(bronze) Verawaty Wiharjo; (bronze) Ivana Lie	(gold) Ade Chandra, Christian Hadinata	(silver) Imelda Wiguna, Verawaty Wiharjo	—N/a
1980	(gold) Liem Swie King	—N/a	(gold) Ade Chandra, Christian Hadinata	(silver) Imelda Wiguna, Verawaty Wiharjo	—N/a
1981	—N/a	(bronze) Ivana Lie	—N/a	—N/a	—N/a
1982	(gold) Liem Swie King	(silver) Verawaty Fadjrin	—N/a	—N/a	—N/a
1983	(silver) Hastomo Arbi; (bronze) Icuk Sugiarto	(bronze) Ivana Lie	(silver) Bobby Ertanto, Christian Hadinata	—N/a	(silver) Christian Hadinata, Ivana Lie
1984	(bronze) Liem Swie King; (bronze) Hastomo Arbi	(bronze) Ivana Lie	(gold) Hariamanto Kartono, Liem Swie King; (bronze) Christian Hadinata, Hadibowo Susanto	—N/a	(silver) Christian Hadinata, Ivana Lie; (bronze) Hariamanto Kartono, Imelda Wiguna
1985	(gold) Icuk Sugiarto	(silver) Ivana Lie	(gold) Hariamanto Kartono, Liem Swie King; (bronze) Christian Hadinata, Hadibowo Susanto	(bronze) Rosiana Tendean, Imelda Wiguna	(gold) Christian Hadinata, Ivana Lie
1986	(gold) Icuk Sugiarto	—N/a	(gold) Bobby Ertanto, Liem Swie King; (silver) Rudy Heryanto, Hadibowo Susanto	(silver) Rosiana Tendean, Imelda Wiguna; (bronze) Verawaty Fadjrin, Ivana Lie	(gold) Eddy Hartono, Verawaty Fadjrin; (bronze) Hafid Yusuf, Yanti Kusmiati
1987	(bronze) Alan Budikusuma	(bronze) Elizabeth Latief	(bronze) Eddy Hartono, Liem Swie King	(bronze) Verawaty Fadjrin, Rosiana Tendean	—N/a
1988	(bronze) Eddy Kurniawan	—N/a	(bronze) Rudy Gunawan, Eddy Hartono	(bronze) Verawaty Fadjrin, Yanti Kusmiati	—N/a
1989	—N/a	(gold) Susi Susanti	(bronze) Rudy Gunawan, Eddy Hartono	(bronze) Verawaty Fadjrin, Yanti Kusmiati	—N/a
1990	(bronze) Ardy Wiranata	(gold) Sarwendah Kusumawardhani; (silver) Susi Susanti	(silver) Rudy Gunawan, Eddy Hartono	(silver) Erma Sulistianingsih, Rosiana Tendean	(gold) Rudy Gunawan, Rosiana Tendean; (bronze) Aryono Miranat, Erma Sulistianingsih
1991	(gold) Ardy Wiranata	(silver) Sarwendah Kusumawardhani; (bronze) Susi Susanti	—N/a	(silver) Erma Sulistianingsih, Rosiana Tendean	(gold) Rudy Gunawan, Rosiana Tendean
1992	(gold) Joko Suprianto; (silver) Hermawan Susanto	—N/a	(silver) Rexy Mainaky, Ricky Subagja	(bronze) Erma Sulistianingsih, Rosiana Tendean	(gold) Rudy Gunawan, Rosiana Tendean
1993	(gold) Alan Budikusuma; (silver) Joko Suprianto; (bronze) Hermawan Susanto	(gold) Susi Susanti	(gold) Rexy Mainaky, Ricky Subagja	(bronze) Finarsih, Lili Tampi	(silver) Aryono Miranat, Eliza Nathanael
1994	(gold) Hariyanto Arbi; (bronze) Ardy Wiranata; (bronze) Joko Suprianto	(gold) Susi Susanti	(silver) Rudy Gunawan, Bambang Suprianto	(gold) Finarsih, Lili Tampi	(bronze) Aryono Miranat, Rosalina Riseu
1995	(gold) Joko Suprianto; (silver) Alan Budikusuma; (bronze) Ardy Wiranata	(silver) Susi Susanti; (bronze) Mia Audina	(gold) Rexy Mainaky, Ricky Subagja; (bronze) Antonius Ariantho, Denny Kantono	(gold) Eliza Nathanael, Zelin Resiana; (silver) Finarsih, Lili Tampi	(gold) Tri Kusharjanto, Minarti Timur; (bronze) Flandy Limpele, Rosalina Riseu
1996	(silver) Jeffer Rosobin	(gold) Susi Susanti; (bronze) Mia Audina	(gold) Antonius Ariantho, Denny Kantono; (silver) Sigit Budiarto, Rexy Mainaky	(bronze) Eliza Nathanael, Zelin Resiana	(gold) Sandiarto, Minarti Timur; (silver) Flandy Limpele, Rosalina Riseu
1997	(silver) Joko Suprianto; (bronze) Indra Wijaya	(gold) Susi Susanti; (bronze) Mia Audina	(gold) Rexy Mainaky, Ricky Subagja; (bronze) Sigit Budiarto, Candra Wijaya	(bronze) Eliza Nathanael, Zelin Resiana; (bronze) Finarsih, Indarti Issolina	(silver) Tri Kusharjanto, Minarti Timur; (bronze) Flandy Limpele, Rosalina Riseu; (bronze) Imam Tohari, Emma Ermawati
2005	—N/a	—N/a	(silver) Sigit Budiarto, Candra Wijaya	—N/a	(silver) Nova Widianto, Liliyana Natsir
2006	(bronze) Taufik Hidayat	—N/a	(gold) Markis Kido, Hendra Setiawan	—N/a	(gold) Nova Widianto, Liliyana Natsir

== Participation in major team tournament ==
=== Thomas Cup ===
At the Thomas Cup, Indonesia leads in total titles with fourteen. It won four consecutive titles from 1970 through 1979 and five consecutive titles from 1994 through 2002. Indonesia's ten-year reign as Champions was ended by the resurgence of China in 2004 when the Chinese won the title in Jakarta. Indonesia has played in the decisive final tie (men's team match) on nineteen occasions. Since the Thomas Cup format was overhauled in 1984, it has failed to place among the top four teams only once, in 2012. In 2026, it has failed in group stage for the first time in history.

Year	Squads		Matches						Result	Ref
Year	Squads		Q / GS			1R / QF	2R / SF	CR / F	Result	Ref
1949	Did not enter									
1952	Did not enter									
1955	Did not enter									
1958	Lie Po Djian, Njoo Kiem Bee, Olich Solichin, Ferry Sonneville, Tan Joe Hock, Tan King Gwan, Eddy Yusuf		(New Zealand); W (9–0)	(Australia); W (9–0)	—	(Denmark); W (6–3)	(Thailand); W (8–1)	(Federation of Malaya); W (6–3)	(gold) Champions	
1961	Lie Po Djian, Njoo Kiem Bee, Ferry Sonneville, Tan Joe Hock, Tan King Gwan, Eddy Yusuf		Bye					(Thailand); W (6–3)	(gold) Champions	
1964	Ang Tjin Siang, Tutang Djamaludin, Ferry Sonneville, Tan Joe Hock, Tan King Gwan, Abdul Patah Unang		Bye					(Denmark); W (5–4)	(gold) Champions	
1967	Rudy Hartono, Muljadi, Ferry Sonneville, Agus Susanto, Tan King Gwan, Abdul Patah Unang		Bye					(Malaysia); L (3–6)	(silver) Runners-up	
1970	Darmadi, Indra Gunawan, Rudy Hartono, Indratno, Mintarja, Muljadi		(India); W (7–2)	(Thailand); W (6–3)	(Japan); W (5–4)	(New Zealand); W (9–0)	(Canada); W (9–0)	(Malaysia); W (7–2)	(gold) Champions	
1973	Ade Chandra, Indra Gunawan, Christian Hadinata, Rudy Hartono, Muljadi, Amril Nurman, Tjun Tjun		Bye				(Thailand); W (8–1)	(Denmark); W (8–1)	(gold) Champions	
1976	Ade Chandra, Christian Hadinata, Rudy Hartono, Liem Swie King, Amril Nurman, Iie Sumirat, Tjun Tjun, Johan Wahjudi		Bye				(Thailand); W (8–1)	(Malaysia); W (9–0)	(gold) Champions	
1979	Christian Hadinata, Rudy Hartono, Liem Swie King, Lius Pongoh, Iie Sumirat, Tjun Tjun, Johan Wahjudi		Bye				(Japan); W (9–0)	(Denmark); W (9–0)	(gold) Champions	
1982	Christian Hadinata, Rudy Hartono, Rudy Heryanto, Hariamanto Kartono, Liem Swie King, Lius Pongoh		Bye				(England); W (8–1)	(China); L (4–5)	(silver) Runners-up	
1984	MS	Hastomo Arbi, Hadiyanto, Eddy Kurniawan, Liem Swie King, Icuk Sugiarto	(Japan); W (4–1)	(Malaysia); W (5–0)	(England); W (3–2)	—	(South Korea); W (4–1)	(China); W (3–2)	(gold) Champions	
1984	MD	Christian Hadinata, Rudy Heryanto, Hariamanto Kartono, Hadibowo Susanto	(Japan); W (4–1)	(Malaysia); W (5–0)	(England); W (3–2)	—	(South Korea); W (4–1)	(China); W (3–2)	(gold) Champions	
1986	MS	Eddy Kurniawan, Liem Swie King, Lius Pongoh, Icuk Sugiarto	(Sweden); W (5–0)	(South Korea); W (4–1)	(Denmark); W (4–1)	—	(Malaysia); W (4–1)	(China); L (2–3)	(silver) Runners-up	
1986	MD	Bobby Ertanto, Christian Hadinata, Hariamanto Kartono, Hadibowo Susanto	(Sweden); W (5–0)	(South Korea); W (4–1)	(Denmark); W (4–1)	—	(Malaysia); W (4–1)	(China); L (2–3)	(silver) Runners-up	
1988	MS	Alan Budikusuma, Eddy Kurniawan, Icuk Sugiarto, Ardy Wiranata	(Sweden); W (5–0)	(South Korea); W (4–1)	(Denmark); W (3–2)	—	(Malaysia); L (2–3)	(Denmark); W (5–0)	(bronze) Third place	
1988	MD	Bobby Ertanto, Rudy Gunawan, Eddy Hartono, Liem Swie King, Hadibowo Susanto	(Sweden); W (5–0)	(South Korea); W (4–1)	(Denmark); W (3–2)	—	(Malaysia); L (2–3)	(Denmark); W (5–0)	(bronze) Third place	
1990	MS	Eddy Kurniawan, Alan Budikusuma, Joko Suprianto, Ardy Wiranata	(Denmark); W (4–1)	(Japan); W (5–0)	(England); W (5–0)	—	(Malaysia); L (2–3)	—	(bronze) Semi-finalists	
1990	MD	Rudy Gunawan, Eddy Hartono, Richard Mainaky, Icuk Sugiarto, Bagus Setiadi	(Denmark); W (4–1)	(Japan); W (5–0)	(England); W (5–0)	—	(Malaysia); L (2–3)	—	(bronze) Semi-finalists	
1992	MS	Alan Budikusuma, Joko Suprianto, Hermawan Susanto, Ardy Wiranata	(Sweden); W (4–1)	(Thailand); W (4–1)	(China); L (0–5)	—	(South Korea); W (5–0)	(Malaysia); L (2–3)	(silver) Runners-up	
1992	MD	Eddy Hartono, Rudy Gunawan, Rexy Mainaky, Bagus Setiadi, Ricky Subagja	(Sweden); W (4–1)	(Thailand); W (4–1)	(China); L (0–5)	—	(South Korea); W (5–0)	(Malaysia); L (2–3)	(silver) Runners-up	
1994	MS	Hariyanto Arbi, Joko Suprianto, Hermawan Susanto, Ardy Wiranata	(Finland); W (5–0)	(Sweden); W (5–0)	(China); W (5–0)	—	(South Korea); W (4–1)	(Malaysia); W (3–0)	(gold) Champions	
1994	MD	Rudy Gunawan, Eddy Hartono, Rexy Mainaky, Ricky Subagja, Bambang Suprianto	(Finland); W (5–0)	(Sweden); W (5–0)	(China); W (5–0)	—	(South Korea); W (4–1)	(Malaysia); W (3–0)	(gold) Champions	
1996	MS	Hariyanto Arbi, Alan Budikusuma, Joko Suprianto, Ardy Wiranata	(England); W (5–0)	(China); W (3–2)	(Sweden); W (5–0)	—	(South Korea); W (3–2)	(Denmark); W (5–0)	(gold) Champions	
1996	MD	Antonius Ariantho, Rudy Gunawan, Denny Kantono, Rexy Mainaky, Ricky Subagja, Bambang Suprianto	(England); W (5–0)	(China); W (3–2)	(Sweden); W (5–0)	—	(South Korea); W (3–2)	(Denmark); W (5–0)	(gold) Champions	
1998	MS	Hariyanto Arbi, Hendrawan, Marleve Mainaky, Joko Suprianto, Indra Wijaya	(South Korea); W (4–1)	(Malaysia); W (4–1)	(Netherlands); W (5–0)	—	(China); W (3–2)	(Malaysia); W (3–2)	(gold) Champions	
1998	MD	Sigit Budiarto, Tony Gunawan, Rexy Mainaky, Ricky Subagja, Candra Wijaya	(South Korea); W (4–1)	(Malaysia); W (4–1)	(Netherlands); W (5–0)	—	(China); W (3–2)	(Malaysia); W (3–2)	(gold) Champions	
2000	MS	Hariyanto Arbi, Hendrawan, Taufik Hidayat, Marleve Mainaky	(China); W (4–1)	(England); W (5–0)	(Sweden); W (5–0)	—	(Denmark); W (3–2)	(China); W (3–0)	(gold) Champions	
2000	MD	Antonius Ariantho, Sigit Budiarto, Tony Gunawan, Rexy Mainaky, Ricky Subagja, Candra Wijaya	(China); W (4–1)	(England); W (5–0)	(Sweden); W (5–0)	—	(Denmark); W (3–2)	(China); W (3–0)	(gold) Champions	
2002	MS	Rony Agustinus, Hendrawan, Taufik Hidayat, Marleve Mainaky, Budi Santoso	(Thailand); W (5–0)	(Malaysia); W (4–1)	(Germany); W (5–0)	—	(Denmark); W (3–0)	(Malaysia); W (3–2)	(gold) Champions	
2002	MD	Sigit Budiarto, Halim Haryanto, Tri Kusharyanto, Bambang Suprianto, Candra Wijaya	(Thailand); W (5–0)	(Malaysia); W (4–1)	(Germany); W (5–0)	—	(Denmark); W (3–0)	(Malaysia); W (3–2)	(gold) Champions	
2004	MS	Taufik Hidayat, Sony Dwi Kuncoro, Wimpie Mahardi, Simon Santoso	(United States); W (5–0)	(China); L (0–5)	—	(Malaysia); W (3–1)	(Denmark); L (2–3)	—	(bronze) Semi-finalists	
2004	MD	Luluk Hadiyanto, Eng Hian, Tri Kusharyanto, Flandy Limpele, Candra Wijaya, Alvent Yulianto	(United States); W (5–0)	(China); L (0–5)	—	(Malaysia); W (3–1)	(Denmark); L (2–3)	—	(bronze) Semi-finalists	
2006	MS	Taufik Hidayat, Sony Dwi Kuncoro, Simon Santoso, Markus Wijanu	(New Zealand); W (5–0)	(South Korea); W (3–2)	—	(Japan); W (3–1)	(China); L (0–3)	—	(bronze) Semi-finalists	
2006	MD	Sigit Budiarto, Luluk Hadiyanto, Markis Kido, Hendra Setiawan, Candra Wijaya, Alvent Yulianto	(New Zealand); W (5–0)	(South Korea); W (3–2)	—	(Japan); W (3–1)	(China); L (0–3)	—	(bronze) Semi-finalists	
2008	MS	Taufik Hidayat, Sony Dwi Kuncoro, Simon Santoso, Tommy Sugiarto	(Thailand); W (3–2)	(Germany); W (5–0)	—	(England); W (3–0)	(South Korea); L (0–3)	—	(bronze) Semi-finalists	
2008	MD	Hendra Aprida Gunawan, Markis Kido, Joko Riyadi, Hendra Setiawan, Nova Widianto, Candra Wijaya	(Thailand); W (3–2)	(Germany); W (5–0)	—	(England); W (3–0)	(South Korea); L (0–3)	—	(bronze) Semi-finalists	
2010	MS	Taufik Hidayat, Sony Dwi Kuncoro, Dionysius Hayom Rumbaka, Simon Santoso	(Australia); W (5–0)	(India); W (4–1)	—	(India); W (3–0)	(Japan); W (3–1)	(China); L (0–3)	(silver) Runners-up	
2010	MD	Mohammad Ahsan, Hendra Aprida Gunawan, Markis Kido, Hendra Setiawan, Nova Widianto, Alvent Yulianto	(Australia); W (5–0)	(India); W (4–1)	—	(India); W (3–0)	(Japan); W (3–1)	(China); L (0–3)	(silver) Runners-up	
2012	MS	Taufik Hidayat, Dionysius Hayom Rumbaka, Simon Santoso, Tommy Sugiarto	(England); W (4–1)	(China); L (0–5)	—	(Japan); L (2–3)	—	—	Quarter-finalists	
2012	MD	Mohammad Ahsan, Markis Kido, Rian Agung Saputro, Bona Septano, Hendra Setiawan, Alvent Yulianto	(England); W (4–1)	(China); L (0–5)	—	(Japan); L (2–3)	—	—	Quarter-finalists	
2014	MS	Ihsan Maulana Mustofa, Dionysius Hayom Rumbaka, Simon Santoso, Tommy Sugiarto	(Singapore); W (5–0)	(Nigeria); W (5–0)	(Thailand); W (4–1)	(South Korea); W (3–2)	(Malaysia); L (3–0)	—	(bronze) Semi-finalists	
2014	MD	Mohammad Ahsan, Berry Angriawan, Angga Pratama, Rian Agung Saputro, Hendra Setiawan, Ricky Karanda Suwardi	(Singapore); W (5–0)	(Nigeria); W (5–0)	(Thailand); W (4–1)	(South Korea); W (3–2)	(Malaysia); L (3–0)	—	(bronze) Semi-finalists	
2016	MS	Jonatan Christie, Anthony Sinisuka Ginting, Ihsan Maulana Mustofa, Tommy Sugiarto	(Hong Kong); W (5–0)	(Thailand); W (4–1)	(India); W (5–0)	(Hong Kong); W (3–1)	(South Korea); W (3–1)	(Denmark); L (2–3)	(silver) Runners-up	
2016	MD	Mohammad Ahsan, Marcus Fernaldi Gideon, Angga Pratama, Hendra Setiawan, Kevin Sanjaya Sukamuljo, Ricky Karanda Suwardi	(Hong Kong); W (5–0)	(Thailand); W (4–1)	(India); W (5–0)	(Hong Kong); W (3–1)	(South Korea); W (3–1)	(Denmark); L (2–3)	(silver) Runners-up	
2018	MS	Jonatan Christie, Anthony Sinisuka Ginting, Firman Abdul Kholik, Ihsan Maulana Mustofa	(Canada); W (5–0)	(Thailand); W (4–1)	(South Korea); W (3–2)	(Chinese Taipei); W (3–0)	(China); L (1–3)	—	(bronze) Semi-finalists	
2018	MD	Mohammad Ahsan, Fajar Alfian, Muhammad Rian Ardianto, Marcus Fernaldi Gideon, Hendra Setiawan, Kevin Sanjaya Sukamuljo	(Canada); W (5–0)	(Thailand); W (4–1)	(South Korea); W (3–2)	(Chinese Taipei); W (3–0)	(China); L (1–3)	—	(bronze) Semi-finalists	
2020	MS	Jonatan Christie, Anthony Sinisuka Ginting, Shesar Hiren Rhustavito, Chico Aura Dwi Wardoyo	(Algeria); W (5–0)	(Thailand); W (3–2)	(Chinese Taipei); W (3–2)	(Malaysia); W (3–0)	(Denmark); W (3–1)	(China); W (3–0)	(gold) Champions	
2020	MD	Mohammad Ahsan, Fajar Alfian, Muhammad Rian Ardianto, Leo Rolly Carnando, Marcus Fernaldi Gideon, Daniel Marthin, Hendra Setiawan, Kevin Sanjaya Sukamuljo	(Algeria); W (5–0)	(Thailand); W (3–2)	(Chinese Taipei); W (3–2)	(Malaysia); W (3–0)	(Denmark); W (3–1)	(China); W (3–0)	(gold) Champions	
2022	MS	Anthony Sinisuka Ginting, Jonatan Christie, Shesar Hiren Rhustavito, Tegar Sulistio, Syabda Perkasa Belawa	(Singapore); W (4–1)	(Thailand); W (4–1)	(South Korea); W (3–2)	(China); W (3–0)	(Japan); W (3–2)	(India); L (0–3)	(silver) Runners-up	
2022	MD	Kevin Sanjaya Sukamuljo, Mohammad Ahsan, Hendra Setiawan, Fajar Alfian, Muhammad Rian Ardianto, Bagas Maulana, Muhammad Shohibul Fikri	(Singapore); W (4–1)	(Thailand); W (4–1)	(South Korea); W (3–2)	(China); W (3–0)	(Japan); W (3–2)	(India); L (0–3)	(silver) Runners-up	
2024	MS	Anthony Sinisuka Ginting, Jonatan Christie, Chico Aura Dwi Wardoyo, Alwi Farhan	(England); W (5–0)	(Thailand); W (4–1)	(India); W (4–1)	(South Korea); W (3–1)	(Chinese Taipei); W (3–0)	(China); L (1–3)	(silver) Runners-up	
2024	MD	Fajar Alfian, Muhammad Rian Ardianto, Muhammad Shohibul Fikri, Bagas Maulana, Leo Rolly Carnando, Daniel Marthin	(England); W (5–0)	(Thailand); W (4–1)	(India); W (4–1)	(South Korea); W (3–1)	(Chinese Taipei); W (3–0)	(China); L (1–3)	(silver) Runners-up	
2026	MS	Jonatan Christie, Alwi Farhan, Zaki Ubaidillah, Anthony Sinisuka Ginting	(Algeria); W (5–0)	(Thailand); W (3–2)	(France); L (1–4)	—	—	—	Group stage	
2026	MD	Fajar Alfian, Muhammad Shohibul Fikri, Sabar Karyaman Gutama, Muhammad Reza Pahlevi Isfahani, Raymond Indra, Nikolaus Joaquin	(Algeria); W (5–0)	(Thailand); W (3–2)	(France); L (1–4)	—	—	—	Group stage	

Red border color indicates tournament was held on home soil.

=== Uber Cup ===
Year	Squads		Result	Ref
Year	Singles	Doubles	Result	Ref
1957	Did not enter			
1960	Did not enter			
1963	Minarni; Retno Koestijah; Corry Kawilarang; Happy Herowati; Oey Lin Nio		Final round inter-zone (3rd)	
1966	Minarni; Retno Koestijah; Corry Kawilarang; Hesty Lianawati; Megah Idawati		First round inter-zone (4th)	
1969	Utami Dewi; Retno Koestijah; Hesty Lianawati; Minarni; Nurhaena; Poppy Tumengkol		(silver) Runners-up	
1972	Utami Dewi; Regina Masli; Retno Koestijah; Intan Nurtjahja; Taty Sumirah; Poppy Tumengkol		(silver) Runners-up	
1975	Utami Dewi; Regina Masli; Minarni; Taty Sumirah; Theresia Widiastuti; Imelda Wiguna		(gold) Champions	
1978	Ivanna Lie; Regina Masli; Tjan So Gwan; Theresia Widiastuti; Imelda Wiguna; Verawaty Wiharjo		(silver) Runners-up	
1981	Ruth Damayanti; Ivanna Lie; Taty Sumirah; Theresia Widiastuti; Imelda Wiguna; Verawaty Wiharjo		(silver) Runners-up	
1984	Mary Herlim; Ratih Kumaladewi; Elizabeth Latief; Ivanna Lie	Ruth Damayanti; Tjan So Gwan; Rosiana Tendean; Imelda Wiguna	Group stage (5th)	
1986	Sarwendah Kusumawardhani; Elizabeth Latief; Ratih Kumaladewi; Ivanna Lie	Verawaty Fajrin; Yanti Kusmiati; Rosiana Tendean; Imelda Wiguna	(silver) Runners-up	
1988	Kho Mei Hwa; Sarwendah Kusumawardhani; Lilik Sudarwati; Elizabeth Latief; Susi Susanti	Dwi Elmyati; Verawaty Fadjrin; Yanti Kusmiati; Erma Sulistianingsih	(bronze) Third place	
1990	Sarwendah Kusumawardhani; Susi Susanti; Minarti Timur; Lilik Sudarwati	Yanti Kusmiati; Erma Sulistianingsih; Rosiana Tendean; Verawaty Wiharjo	(bronze) Semi-finalists	
1992	Yuni Kartika; Sarwendah Kusumawardhani; Yuliani Sentosa; Susi Susanti	Catherine; Finarsih; Erma Sulistianingsih; Lili Tampi; Rosiana Tendean	(bronze) Semi-finalists	
1994	Mia Audina; Yuni Kartika; Yuliani Sentosa; Susi Susanti	Finarsih; Eliza Nathanael; Zelin Resiana; Lili Tampi; Rosiana Tendean	(gold) Champions	
1996	Mia Audina; Lidya Djaelawijaya; Meiluawati; Yuliani Sentosa; Susi Susanti	Finarsih; Deyana Lomban; Eliza Nathanael; Zelin Resiana; Lili Tampi	(gold) Champions	
1998	Ellen Angelina; Mia Audina; Cindana Hartono Kusuma; Meiluawati; Susi Susanti	Finarsih; Indarti Issolina; Deyana Lomban; Eliza Nathanael; Zelin Resiana	(silver) Runners-up	
2000	Ellen Angelina; Lidya Djaelawijaya; Yuli Marfuah; Ninik Masrikah	Deyana Lomban; Eliza Nathanael; Zelin Resiana; Etty Tantri; Minarti Timur; Cynthia Tuwankotta	(bronze) Semi-finalists	
2002	Ellen Angelina; Lidya Djaelawijaya; Yuli Marfuah; Atu Rosalina	Eny Erlangga; Emma Ermawati; Deyana Lomban; Vita Marissa; Jo Novita; Minarti Timur	Group stage 5th	
2004	Silvi Antarini; Adriyanti Firdasari; Fransisca Ratnasari; Maria Kristin Yulianti	Eny Erlangga; Rani Mundiasti; Liliyana Natsir; Jo Novita; Lita Nurlita; Greysia Polii	Quarter-finalists	
2006	Did not qualify			
2008	Pia Zebadiah Bernadet; Adriyanti Firdasari; Fransisca Ratnasari; Maria Kristin Yulianti	Vita Marissa; Rani Mundiasti; Liliyana Natsir; Jo Novita; Endang Nursugianti; Greysia Polii	(silver) Runners-up	
2010	Lindaweni Fanetri; Adriyanti Firdasari; Maria Febe Kusumastuti; Maria Kristin Yulianti	Anneke Feinya Agustin; Shendy Puspa Irawati; Meiliana Jauhari; Nitya Krishinda Maheswari; Liliyana Natsir; Greysia Polii	(bronze) Semi-finalists	
2012	Lindaweni Fanetri; Adriyanti Firdasari; Maria Febe Kusumastuti; Bellaetrix Manuputty	Anneke Feinya Agustin; Suci Rizki Andini; Della Destiara Haris; Meiliana Jauhari; Nitya Krishinda Maheswari; Greysia Polii	Quarter-finalists	
2014	Lindaweni Fanetri; Adriyanti Firdasari; Maria Febe Kusumastuti; Bellaetrix Manuputty	Suci Rizki Andini; Pia Zebadiah Bernadet; Nitya Krishinda Maheswari; Tiara Rosalia Nuraidah; Greysia Polii; Rizki Amelia Pradipta	Quarter-finalists	
2016	Fitriani; Maria Febe Kusumastuti; Hanna Ramadini; Gregoria Mariska Tunjung	Anggia Shitta Awanda; Della Destiara Haris; Ni Ketut Mahadewi Istarani; Tiara Rosalia Nuraidah; Greysia Polii; Rosyita Eka Putri Sari	Quarter-finalists	
2018	Dinar Dyah Ayustine; Fitriani; Ruselli Hartawan; Gregoria Mariska Tunjung	Della Destiara Haris; Ni Ketut Mahadewi Istarani; Nitya Krishinda Maheswari; Greysia Polii; Rizki Amelia Pradipta; Apriyani Rahayu	Quarter-finalists	
2020	Nandini Putri Arumni; Gregoria Mariska Tunjung; Ester Nurumi Tri Wardoyo; Putri Kusuma Wardani	Febby Valencia Dwijayanti Gani; Nita Violina Marwah; Jesita Putri Miantoro; Greysia Polii; Apriyani Rahayu; Siti Fadia Silva Ramadhanti; Ribka Sugiarto; Putri Syaikah	Quarter-finalists	
2022	Komang Ayu Cahya Dewi; Aisyah Sativa Fatetani; Bilqis Prasista; Tasya Farahnailah; Siti Sarah Azzahra	Nita Violina Marwah; Febriana Dwipuji Kusuma; Amalia Cahaya Pratiwi; Jesita Putri Miantoro; Lanny Tria Mayasari; Tryola Nadia; Melani Mamahit	Quarter-finalists	
2024	Gregoria Mariska Tunjung; Ester Nurumi Tri Wardoyo; Komang Ayu Cahya Dewi; Ruzana	Apriyani Rahayu; Siti Fadia Silva Ramadhanti; Lanny Tria Mayasari; Ribka Sugiarto; Meilysa Trias Puspita Sari; Rachel Allessya Rose	(silver) Runners-up	
2026	Putri Kusuma Wardani; Thalita Ramadhani Wiryawan; Ni Kadek Dhinda Amartya Pratiwi; Ester Nurumi Tri Wardoyo	Febi Setianingrum; Rachel Allessya Rose; Meilysa Trias Puspita Sari; Febriana Dwipuji Kusuma; Amalia Cahaya Pratiwi; Siti Fadia Silva Ramadhanti	(bronze) Semi-finalists	

Red border color indicates tournament was held on home soil.

=== Sudirman Cup ===
Year	Squads		Matches						Result	Ref
Year	Squads		GS			QF	SF	F	Result	Ref
1989	MS	Eddy Kurniawan, Icuk Sugiarto	(England); W (5-0)	(South Korea); W (4-1)	—	—	(Denmark); W (5-0)	(South Korea); W (3-2)	(gold) Champions	
1989	WS	Sarwendah Kusumawardhani, Susi Susanti	(England); W (5-0)	(South Korea); W (4-1)	—	—	(Denmark); W (5-0)	(South Korea); W (3-2)	(gold) Champions	
1989	MD	Eddy Hartono, Rudy Gunawan	(England); W (5-0)	(South Korea); W (4-1)	—	—	(Denmark); W (5-0)	(South Korea); W (3-2)	(gold) Champions	
1989	WD	Verawaty Fadjrin, Yanti Kusmiati	(England); W (5-0)	(South Korea); W (4-1)	—	—	(Denmark); W (5-0)	(South Korea); W (3-2)	(gold) Champions	
1989	XD	Aryono Miranat, Minarti Timur	(England); W (5-0)	(South Korea); W (4-1)	—	—	(Denmark); W (5-0)	(South Korea); W (3-2)	(gold) Champions	
1991	MS	Alan Budikusuma, Fung Permadi, Bambang Suprianto, Joko Suprianto, Hermawan Susanto, Ardy Wiranata	(Sweden); W (4-1)	(China); W (3-2)	—	—	(Denmark); W (3-2)	(South Korea); L (2-3)	(silver) Runners-up	
1991	WS	Yuni Kartika, Sarwendah Kusumawardhani, Yuliani Sentosa, Lilik Sudarwati, Susi Susanti	(Sweden); W (4-1)	(China); W (3-2)	—	—	(Denmark); W (3-2)	(South Korea); L (2-3)	(silver) Runners-up	
1991	MD	Rudy Gunawan, Eddy Hartono, Imay Hendra, Rexy Mainaky, Bagus Setiadi, Ricky Subagja	(Sweden); W (4-1)	(China); W (3-2)	—	—	(Denmark); W (3-2)	(South Korea); L (2-3)	(silver) Runners-up	
1991	WD	Catherine, Finarsih, Eliza Nathanael, Erma Sulistyaningsih, Lili Tampi, Rosiana Tendean	(Sweden); W (4-1)	(China); W (3-2)	—	—	(Denmark); W (3-2)	(South Korea); L (2-3)	(silver) Runners-up	
1991	XD	Rudy Gunawan, Rosiana Tendean	(Sweden); W (4-1)	(China); W (3-2)	—	—	(Denmark); W (3-2)	(South Korea); L (2-3)	(silver) Runners-up	
1993	MS	Hariyanto Arbi, Alan Budikusuma, Joko Suprianto, Ardy Wiranata	(Denmark); W (3-2)	(England); W (5-0)	—	—	(China); W (3-2)	(Korea); L (2-3)	(silver) Runners-up	
1993	WS	Minarti Timur, Sarwendah Kusumawardhani, Susi Susanti	(Denmark); W (3-2)	(England); W (5-0)	—	—	(China); W (3-2)	(Korea); L (2-3)	(silver) Runners-up	
1993	MD	Rudy Gunawan, Ricky Subagja, Bambang Suprianto	(Denmark); W (3-2)	(England); W (5-0)	—	—	(China); W (3-2)	(Korea); L (2-3)	(silver) Runners-up	
1993	WD	Eliza Nathanael, Finarsih, Lili Tampi, Zelin Resiana	(Denmark); W (3-2)	(England); W (5-0)	—	—	(China); W (3-2)	(Korea); L (2-3)	(silver) Runners-up	
1993	XD	Denny Kantono, Aryono Miranat, Rosiana Tendean	(Denmark); W (3-2)	(England); W (5-0)	—	—	(China); W (3-2)	(Korea); L (2-3)	(silver) Runners-up	
1995	MS	Hariyanto Arbi, Ardy Wiranata	(Thailand); W (5-0)	(Denmark); W (3-2)	—	—	(South Korea); W (4-1)	(China); L (1-3)	(silver) Runners-up	
1995	WS	Mia Audina, Susi Susanti	(Thailand); W (5-0)	(Denmark); W (3-2)	—	—	(South Korea); W (4-1)	(China); L (1-3)	(silver) Runners-up	
1995	MD	Rudy Gunawan, Rexy Mainaky, Ricky Subagja, Bambang Suprianto	(Thailand); W (5-0)	(Denmark); W (3-2)	—	—	(South Korea); W (4-1)	(China); L (1-3)	(silver) Runners-up	
1995	WD	Eliza Nathanael, Finarsih, Lili Tampi, Zelin Resiana	(Thailand); W (5-0)	(Denmark); W (3-2)	—	—	(South Korea); W (4-1)	(China); L (1-3)	(silver) Runners-up	
1995	XD	Tri Kusharjanto, Aryono Miranat, Minarti Timur	(Thailand); W (5-0)	(Denmark); W (3-2)	—	—	(South Korea); W (4-1)	(China); L (1-3)	(silver) Runners-up	
1997	MS	Hariyanto Arbi, Alan Budikusuma, Joko Suprianto, Ardy Wiranata	(Sweden); W (5-0)	(Denmark); L (2-3)	—	—	(China); L (2-3)	—	(bronze) Semi-finalists	
1997	WS	Mia Audina, Susi Susanti	(Sweden); W (5-0)	(Denmark); L (2-3)	—	—	(China); L (2-3)	—	(bronze) Semi-finalists	
1997	MD	Antonius Ariantho, Sigit Budiarto, Denny Kantono, Rexy Mainaky, Ricky Subagja, Candra Wijaya	(Sweden); W (5-0)	(Denmark); L (2-3)	—	—	(China); L (2-3)	—	(bronze) Semi-finalists	
1997	WD	Indarti Issolina, Deyana Lomban, Eliza Nathanael, Zelin Resiana	(Sweden); W (5-0)	(Denmark); L (2-3)	—	—	(China); L (2-3)	—	(bronze) Semi-finalists	
1997	XD	Flandy Limpele, Tri Kusharjanto, Emma Ermawati, Minarti Timur	(Sweden); W (5-0)	(Denmark); L (2-3)	—	—	(China); L (2-3)	—	(bronze) Semi-finalists	
1999	MS	Hendrawan, Taufik Hidayat	(Malaysia); W (4-1)	(China); L (2-3)	—	—	(Denmark); L (2-3)	—	(bronze) Semi-finalists	
1999	WS	Ellen Angelina, Lidya Djaelawijaya, Cindana Hartono Kusuma	(Malaysia); W (4-1)	(China); L (2-3)	—	—	(Denmark); L (2-3)	—	(bronze) Semi-finalists	
1999	MD	Tony Gunawan, Eng Hian, Flandy Limpele, Rexy Mainaky, Ricky Subagja, Candra Wijaya	(Malaysia); W (4-1)	(China); L (2-3)	—	—	(Denmark); L (2-3)	—	(bronze) Semi-finalists	
1999	WD	Carmelita, Indarti Issolina, Deyana Lomban, Etty Tantri, Cynthia Tuwankotta	(Malaysia); W (4-1)	(China); L (2-3)	—	—	(Denmark); L (2-3)	—	(bronze) Semi-finalists	
1999	XD	Tri Kusharjanto, Bambang Suprianto, Zelin Resiana, Minarti Timur	(Malaysia); W (4-1)	(China); L (2-3)	—	—	(Denmark); L (2-3)	—	(bronze) Semi-finalists	
2001	MS	Budi Santoso, Hendrawan, Rony Agustinus, Taufik Hidayat	(England); W (4-1)	(Denmark); W (3-2)	—	—	(South Korea); W (3-2)	(China); L (1-3)	(silver) Runners-up	
2001	WS	Lidya Djaelawijaya, Yuli Marfuah	(England); W (4-1)	(Denmark); W (3-2)	—	—	(South Korea); W (3-2)	(China); L (1-3)	(silver) Runners-up	
2001	MD	Candra Wijaya, Eng Hian, Flandy Limpele, Halim Haryanto, Sigit Budiarto, Tony Gunawan	(England); W (4-1)	(Denmark); W (3-2)	—	—	(South Korea); W (3-2)	(China); L (1-3)	(silver) Runners-up	
2001	WD	Deyana Lomban, Etty Tantri, Indarti Issolina, Vita Marissa	(England); W (4-1)	(Denmark); W (3-2)	—	—	(South Korea); W (3-2)	(China); L (1-3)	(silver) Runners-up	
2001	XD	Bambang Suprianto, Nova Widianto, Tri Kusharjanto, Minarti Timur	(England); W (4-1)	(Denmark); W (3-2)	—	—	(South Korea); W (3-2)	(China); L (1-3)	(silver) Runners-up	
2003	MS	Budi Santoso, Sony Dwi Kuncoro, Taufik Hidayat	(England); W (3-2)	(Denmark); L (1-4)	—	—	(China); L (1-3)	—	(bronze) Semi-finalists	
2003	WS	Dewi Tira Arisandi, Maria Kristin Yulianti	(England); W (3-2)	(Denmark); L (1-4)	—	—	(China); L (1-3)	—	(bronze) Semi-finalists	
2003	MD	Alvent Yulianto, Candra Wijaya, Halim Haryanto, Luluk Hadiyanto, Sigit Budiarto	(England); W (3-2)	(Denmark); L (1-4)	—	—	(China); L (1-3)	—	(bronze) Semi-finalists	
2003	WD	Eny Erlangga, Jo Novita, Liliyana Natsir, Lita Nurlita	(England); W (3-2)	(Denmark); L (1-4)	—	—	(China); L (1-3)	—	(bronze) Semi-finalists	
2003	XD	Nova Widianto, Tri Kusharjanto, Emma Ermawati, Vita Marissa	(England); W (3-2)	(Denmark); L (1-4)	—	—	(China); L (1-3)	—	(bronze) Semi-finalists	
2005	MS	Simon Santoso, Sony Dwi Kuncoro, Taufik Hidayat	(Hong Kong); W (4-1)	(Sweden); W (4-1)	(China); L (0-5)	—	(Denmark); W (3-0)	(China); L (0-3)	(silver) Runners-up	
2005	WS	Adriyanti Firdasari, Fransisca Ratnasari	(Hong Kong); W (4-1)	(Sweden); W (4-1)	(China); L (0-5)	—	(Denmark); W (3-0)	(China); L (0-3)	(silver) Runners-up	
2005	MD	Alvent Yulianto, Candra Wijaya, Flandy Limpele, Luluk Hadiyanto, Sigit Budiarto	(Hong Kong); W (4-1)	(Sweden); W (4-1)	(China); L (0-5)	—	(Denmark); W (3-0)	(China); L (0-3)	(silver) Runners-up	
2005	WD	Greysia Polii, Jo Novita, Lita Nurlita	(Hong Kong); W (4-1)	(Sweden); W (4-1)	(China); L (0-5)	—	(Denmark); W (3-0)	(China); L (0-3)	(silver) Runners-up	
2005	XD	Nova Widianto, Liliyana Natsir, Yunita Tetty	(Hong Kong); W (4-1)	(Sweden); W (4-1)	(China); L (0-5)	—	(Denmark); W (3-0)	(China); L (0-3)	(silver) Runners-up	
2007	MS	Simon Santoso, Sony Dwi Kuncoro, Taufik Hidayat	(South Korea); L (2-3)	(Denmark); W (4-1)	(Hong Kong); W (4-1)	—	(England); W (3-2)	(China); L (3-0)	(silver) Runners-up	
2007	WS	Adriyanti Firdasari, Maria Kristin Yulianti, Pia Zebadiah Bernadet	(South Korea); L (2-3)	(Denmark); W (4-1)	(Hong Kong); W (4-1)	—	(England); W (3-2)	(China); L (3-0)	(silver) Runners-up	
2007	MD	Alvent Yulianto, Candra Wijaya, Hendra Aprida Gunawan, Hendra Setiawan, Joko Riyadi, Luluk Hadiyanto, Markis Kido	(South Korea); L (2-3)	(Denmark); W (4-1)	(Hong Kong); W (4-1)	—	(England); W (3-2)	(China); L (3-0)	(silver) Runners-up	
2007	WD	Greysia Polii, Lita Nurlita, Rani Mundiasti, Vita Marissa	(South Korea); L (2-3)	(Denmark); W (4-1)	(Hong Kong); W (4-1)	—	(England); W (3-2)	(China); L (3-0)	(silver) Runners-up	
2007	XD	Flandy Limpele, Muhammad Rijal, Nova Widianto, Endang Nursugianti, Liliyana Natsir	(South Korea); L (2-3)	(Denmark); W (4-1)	(Hong Kong); W (4-1)	—	(England); W (3-2)	(China); L (3-0)	(silver) Runners-up	
2009	MS	Sony Dwi Kuncoro, Simon Santoso, Tommy Sugiarto	(Japan); W (4-1)	(England); W (4-1)	(China); L (0-5)	—	(South Korea); L (1-3)	—	(bronze) Semi-finalists	
2009	WS	Adriyanti Firdasari, Maria Kristin Yulianti	(Japan); W (4-1)	(England); W (4-1)	(China); L (0-5)	—	(South Korea); L (1-3)	—	(bronze) Semi-finalists	
2009	MD	Mohammad Ahsan, Yonathan Suryatama Dasuki, Markis Kido, Bona Septano, Hendra Setiawan, Rian Sukmawan	(Japan); W (4-1)	(England); W (4-1)	(China); L (0-5)	—	(South Korea); L (1-3)	—	(bronze) Semi-finalists	
2009	WD	Shendy Puspa Irawati, Meiliana Jauhari, Nitya Krishinda Maheswari, Greysia Polii	(Japan); W (4-1)	(England); W (4-1)	(China); L (0-5)	—	(South Korea); L (1-3)	—	(bronze) Semi-finalists	
2009	XD	Devin Lahardi Fitriawan, Fran Kurniawan, Liliyana Natsir, Lita Nurlita, Nova Widianto	(Japan); W (4-1)	(England); W (4-1)	(China); L (0-5)	—	(South Korea); L (1-3)	—	(bronze) Semi-finalists	
2011	MS	Taufik Hidayat, Dionysius Hayom Rumbaka, Simon Santoso	(Russia); W (4-1)	(Malaysia); W (3-2)	—	(Japan); W (3-2)	(Denmark); L (1-3)	—	(bronze) Semi-finalists	
2011	WS	Lindaweni Fanetri, Adriyanti Firdasari	(Russia); W (4-1)	(Malaysia); W (3-2)	—	(Japan); W (3-2)	(Denmark); L (1-3)	—	(bronze) Semi-finalists	
2011	MD	Mohammad Ahsan, Alvent Yulianto Chandra, Hendra Aprida Gunawan, Bona Septano	(Russia); W (4-1)	(Malaysia); W (3-2)	—	(Japan); W (3-2)	(Denmark); L (1-3)	—	(bronze) Semi-finalists	
2011	WD	Anneke Feinya Agustin, Meiliana Jauhari, Nitya Krishinda Maheswari, Greysia Polii	(Russia); W (4-1)	(Malaysia); W (3-2)	—	(Japan); W (3-2)	(Denmark); L (1-3)	—	(bronze) Semi-finalists	
2011	XD	Tontowi Ahmad, Pia Zebadiah Bernadet, Fran Kurniawan, Liliyana Natsir, Debby Susanto	(Russia); W (4-1)	(Malaysia); W (3-2)	—	(Japan); W (3-2)	(Denmark); L (1-3)	—	(bronze) Semi-finalists	
2013	MS	Dionysius Hayom Rumbaka, Tommy Sugiarto	(India); W (4-1)	(China); L (0-5)	—	(China); L (2-3)	—	—	Quarter-finalists (5th)	
2013	WS	Lindaweni Fanetri, Bellaetrix Manuputty, Aprilia Yuswandari	(India); W (4-1)	(China); L (0-5)	—	(China); L (2-3)	—	—	Quarter-finalists (5th)	
2013	MD	Mohammad Ahsan, Angga Pratama, Rian Agung Saputro, Hendra Setiawan	(India); W (4-1)	(China); L (0-5)	—	(China); L (2-3)	—	—	Quarter-finalists (5th)	
2013	WD	Gebby Ristiyani Imawan, Meiliana Jauhari, Nitya Krishinda Maheswari, Tiara Rosalia Nuraidah, Greysia Polii	(India); W (4-1)	(China); L (0-5)	—	(China); L (2-3)	—	—	Quarter-finalists (5th)	
2013	XD	Tontowi Ahmad, Fran Kurniawan, Liliyana Natsir, Muhammad Rijal, Debby Susanto	(India); W (4-1)	(China); L (0-5)	—	(China); L (2-3)	—	—	Quarter-finalists (5th)	
2015	MS	Jonatan Christie, Firman Abdul Kholik, Ihsan Maulana Mustofa	(England); W (3-2)	(Denmark); W (3-2)	—	(Chinese Taipei); W (3-1)	(China); L (1-3)	—	(bronze) Semi-finalists	
2015	WS	Lindaweni Fanetri, Bellaetrix Manuputty, Hanna Ramadini	(England); W (3-2)	(Denmark); W (3-2)	—	(Chinese Taipei); W (3-1)	(China); L (1-3)	—	(bronze) Semi-finalists	
2015	MD	Mohammad Ahsan, Marcus Fernaldi Gideon, Angga Pratama, Hendra Setiawan, Kevin Sanjaya Sukamuljo, Ricky Karanda Suwardi	(England); W (3-2)	(Denmark); W (3-2)	—	(Chinese Taipei); W (3-1)	(China); L (1-3)	—	(bronze) Semi-finalists	
2015	WD	Anggia Shitta Awanda, Della Destiara Haris, Nitya Krishinda Maheswari, Greysia Polii	(England); W (3-2)	(Denmark); W (3-2)	—	(Chinese Taipei); W (3-1)	(China); L (1-3)	—	(bronze) Semi-finalists	
2015	XD	Tontowi Ahmad, Praveen Jordan, Liliyana Natsir, Debby Susanto	(England); W (3-2)	(Denmark); W (3-2)	—	(Chinese Taipei); W (3-1)	(China); L (1-3)	—	(bronze) Semi-finalists	
2017	MS	Jonatan Christie, Anthony Sinisuka Ginting	(India); L (1-4)	(Denmark); W (2-3)	—	—	—	—	Group stage (9th)	
2017	WS	Dinar Dyah Ayustine, Fitriani, Gregoria Mariska Tunjung,	(India); L (1-4)	(Denmark); W (2-3)	—	—	—	—	Group stage (9th)	
2017	MD	Mohammad Ahsan, Marcus Fernaldi Gideon, Angga Pratama, Rian Agung Saputro, Kevin Sanjaya Sukamuljo, Ricky Karanda Suwardi	(India); L (1-4)	(Denmark); W (2-3)	—	—	—	—	Group stage (9th)	
2017	WD	Anggia Shitta Awanda, Della Destiara Haris, Greysia Polii, Rosyita Eka Putri Sari, Apriani Rahayu	(India); L (1-4)	(Denmark); W (2-3)	—	—	—	—	Group stage (9th)	
2017	XD	Tontowi Ahmad, Praveen Jordan, Debby Susanto, Gloria Emanuelle Widjaja	(India); L (1-4)	(Denmark); W (2-3)	—	—	—	—	Group stage (9th)	
2019	MS	Jonatan Christie, Anthony Sinisuka Ginting, Shesar Hiren Rhustavito	(England); W (4-1)	(Denmark); L (2-3)	—	(Chinese Taipei); W (3-2)	(Japan); L (1-3)	—	(bronze) Semi-finalists	
2019	WS	Fitriani, Gregoria Mariska Tunjung,	(England); W (4-1)	(Denmark); L (2-3)	—	(Chinese Taipei); W (3-2)	(Japan); L (1-3)	—	(bronze) Semi-finalists	
2019	MD	Mohammad Ahsan, Fajar Alfian, Muhammad Rian Ardianto, Marcus Fernaldi Gideon, Hendra Setiawan, Kevin Sanjaya Sukamuljo	(England); W (4-1)	(Denmark); L (2-3)	—	(Chinese Taipei); W (3-2)	(Japan); L (1-3)	—	(bronze) Semi-finalists	
2019	WD	Ni Ketut Mahadewi Istarani, Greysia Polii, Apriyani Rahayu	(England); W (4-1)	(Denmark); L (2-3)	—	(Chinese Taipei); W (3-2)	(Japan); L (1-3)	—	(bronze) Semi-finalists	
2019	XD	Tontowi Ahmad, Hafiz Faizal, Praveen Jordan, Winny Oktavina Kandow, Melati Daeva Oktavianti, Gloria Emanuelle Widjaja	(England); W (4-1)	(Denmark); L (2-3)	—	(Chinese Taipei); W (3-2)	(Japan); L (1-3)	—	(bronze) Semi-finalists	
2021	MS	Jonatan Christie, Anthony Sinisuka Ginting, Shesar Hiren Rhustavito	(Russia); W (5-0)	(Canada); W (3-2)	(Denmark); W (3-2)	(Malaysia); L (2-3)	—	—	Quarter-finalists (5th)	
2021	WS	Gregoria Mariska Tunjung, Ester Nurumi Tri Wardoyo, Putri Kusuma Wardani	(Russia); W (5-0)	(Canada); W (3-2)	(Denmark); W (3-2)	(Malaysia); L (2-3)	—	—	Quarter-finalists (5th)	
2021	MD	Mohammad Ahsan, Fajar Alfian, Muhammad Rian Ardianto, Marcus Fernaldi Gideon, Hendra Setiawan, Kevin Sanjaya Sukamuljo	(Russia); W (5-0)	(Canada); W (3-2)	(Denmark); W (3-2)	(Malaysia); L (2-3)	—	—	Quarter-finalists (5th)	
2021	WD	Greysia Polii, Apriyani Rahayu, Siti Fadia Silva Ramadhanti, Ribka Sugiarto	(Russia); W (5-0)	(Canada); W (3-2)	(Denmark); W (3-2)	(Malaysia); L (2-3)	—	—	Quarter-finalists (5th)	
2021	XD	Praveen Jordan, Pitha Haningtyas Mentari, Melati Daeva Oktavianti, Rinov Rivaldy	(Russia); W (5-0)	(Canada); W (3-2)	(Denmark); W (3-2)	(Malaysia); L (2-3)	—	—	Quarter-finalists (5th)	
2023	MS	Anthony Sinisuka Ginting, Jonatan Christie	(Canada); W (5-0)	(Germany); W (4-1)	(Thailand); L (2-3)	(China); L (0-3)	—	—	Quarter-finalists (6th)	
2023	WS	Gregoria Mariska Tunjung, Putri Kusuma Wardani	(Canada); W (5-0)	(Germany); W (4-1)	(Thailand); L (2-3)	(China); L (0-3)	—	—	Quarter-finalists (6th)	
2023	MD	Fajar Alfian, Muhammad Rian Ardianto, Leo Rolly Carnando, Daniel Marthin, Marcus Fernaldi Gideon, Kevin Sanjaya Sukamuljo	(Canada); W (5-0)	(Germany); W (4-1)	(Thailand); L (2-3)	(China); L (0-3)	—	—	Quarter-finalists (6th)	
2023	WD	Apriyani Rahayu, Siti Fadia Silva Ramadhanti, Lanny Tria Mayasari, Ribka Sugiarto	(Canada); W (5-0)	(Germany); W (4-1)	(Thailand); L (2-3)	(China); L (0-3)	—	—	Quarter-finalists (6th)	
2023	XD	Rinov Rivaldy, Pitha Haningtyas Mentari, Dejan Ferdinansyah, Gloria Emanuelle Widjaja, Adnan Maulana, Nita Violina Marwah	(Canada); W (5-0)	(Germany); W (4-1)	(Thailand); L (2-3)	(China); L (0-3)	—	—	Quarter-finalists (6th)	
2025	MS	Jonatan Christie, Alwi Farhan, Zaki Ubaidillah	(England); W (5–0)	(India); W (4–1)	(Denmark); W (4–1)	(Thailand); W (3–1)	(South Korea); L (2–3)	—	(bronze) Semi-finalists	
2025	WS	Putri Kusuma Wardani, Ester Nurumi Tri Wardoyo	(England); W (5–0)	(India); W (4–1)	(Denmark); W (4–1)	(Thailand); W (3–1)	(South Korea); L (2–3)	—	(bronze) Semi-finalists	
2025	MD	Fajar Alfian, Muhammad Rian Ardianto, Muhammad Shohibul Fikri, Daniel Marthin, Bagas Maulana	(England); W (5–0)	(India); W (4–1)	(Denmark); W (4–1)	(Thailand); W (3–1)	(South Korea); L (2–3)	—	(bronze) Semi-finalists	
2025	WD	Febriana Dwipuji Kusuma, Amalia Cahaya Pratiwi, Siti Fadia Silva Ramadhanti, Lanny Tria Mayasari	(England); W (5–0)	(India); W (4–1)	(Denmark); W (4–1)	(Thailand); W (3–1)	(South Korea); L (2–3)	—	(bronze) Semi-finalists	
2025	XD	Dejan Ferdinansyah, Gloria Emanuelle Widjaja, Rinov Rivaldy, Pitha Haningtyas Mentari, Rehan Naufal Kusharjanto	(England); W (5–0)	(India); W (4–1)	(Denmark); W (4–1)	(Thailand); W (3–1)	(South Korea); L (2–3)	—	(bronze) Semi-finalists	

Red border color indicates tournament was held on home soil.

== Participation in Asian Games ==
As of the 2026 Asian Games

=== Medals table ===
Badminton at the Asian Games all time medal table-Indonesia
Events		Gold	Silver	Bronze	Total
MS	Men's singles	7	5	7	19
WS	Women's singles	1	1	5	7
MD	Men's doubles	9	5	9	23
WD	Women's doubles	4	3	5	12
XD	Mixed doubles	2	6	10	18
MT	Men's team	6	4	4	14
WT	Women's team	1	4	7	12
Total		30	28	47	105

=== Individual ===
Year	Events				
Year	MS	WS	MD	WD	XD
1962	(gold) Tan Joe Hok; (bronze) Ferry Sonneville	(gold) Minarni; (silver) Corry Kawilarang; (bronze) Happy Herowati	(silver) Tan Joe Hok, Liem Tjeng Kiang; (bronze) Tutang Djamaluddin, Abdul Patah Unang	(gold) Minarni, Retno Kustijah; (silver) Corry Kawilarang, Happy Herowati	—N/a
1966	(gold) Ang Tjin Siang; (silver) Wong Pek Sen	(bronze) Minarni	(silver) Ang Tjin Siang, Tjoa Tjong Boan; (bronze) Tan King Gwang, Abdul Patah Unang	(gold) Minarni, Retno Kustijah	(bronze) Wong Pek Sen, Minarni; (bronze) Tjoa Tjong Boan, Retno Kustijah
1970	(silver) Muljadi	(bronze) Minarni	(bronze) Rudy Hartono, Indra Gunawan	(silver) Retno Kustijah, Nurhaena	(bronze) Rudy Hartono, Minarni
1974	(bronze) Liem Swie King	—N/a	(gold) Tjun Tjun, Johan Wahjudi; (silver) Christian Hadinata, Ade Chandra	(bronze) Theresia Widiastuti, Imelda Wiguna	(gold) Christian Hadinata, Regina Masli; (silver) Tjun Tjun, Sri Wiyanti
1978	(gold) Liem Swie King; (bronze) Iie Sumirat	—N/a	(gold) Christian Hadinata, Ade Chandra	(gold) Verawaty Wiharjo, Imelda Wiguna; (bronze) Theresia Widiastuti, Ruth Damayanti	(silver) Hariamanto Kartono, Theresia Widiastuti; (bronze) Christian Hadinata, Imelda Wiguna
1982	(silver) Liem Swie King	—N/a	(gold) Icuk Sugiarto, Christian Hadinata	—N/a	(gold) Christian Hadinata, Ivana Lie; (silver) Icuk Sugiarto, Ruth Damayanti
1986	—N/a	—N/a	(bronze) Liem Swie King, Bobby Ertanto	(bronze) Rosiana Tendean, Imelda Wiguna	—N/a
1990	(bronze) Alan Budikusuma	(bronze) Susi Susanti	(bronze) Eddy Hartono, Rudy Gunawan	(bronze) Verawaty Fadjrin, Lili Tampi	(silver) Eddy Hartono, Verawaty Fadjrin; (bronze) Rudy Gunawan, Rosiana Tendean
1994	(gold) Hariyanto Arbi; (silver) Joko Suprianto	(bronze) Susi Susanti	(gold) Rexy Mainaky, Ricky Subagja	—N/a	(bronze) Rudy Gunawan, Eliza Nathanael
1998	(silver) Hendrawan	—N/a	(gold) Rexy Mainaky, Ricky Subagja	(silver) Eliza Nathanael, Deyana Lomban	(bronze) Tri Kusharjanto, Minarti Timur
2002	(gold) Taufik Hidayat; (bronze) Hendrawan	—N/a	(bronze) Halim Haryanto, Tri Kusharjanto	—N/a	(bronze) Nova Widianto, Vita Marissa
2006	(gold) Taufik Hidayat	—N/a	(silver) Luluk Hadiyanto, Alvent Yulianto; (bronze) Markis Kido, Hendra Setiawan	—N/a	—N/a
2010	—N/a	—N/a	(gold) Markis Kido, Hendra Setiawan; (bronze) Mohammad Ahsan, Alvent Yulianto	—N/a	—N/a
2014	—N/a	—N/a	(gold) Mohammad Ahsan, Hendra Setiawan	(gold) Nitya Krishinda Maheswari, Greysia Polii	(silver) Tontowi Ahmad, Liliyana Natsir; (bronze) Praveen Jordan, Debby Susanto
2018	(gold) Jonatan Christie; (bronze) Anthony Sinisuka Ginting	—N/a	(gold) Marcus Fernaldi Gideon, Kevin Sanjaya Sukamuljo; (silver) Fajar Alfian, Muhammad Rian Ardianto	(bronze) Greysia Polii, Apriani Rahayu	(bronze) Tontowi Ahmad, Liliyana Natsir
2022	—N/a	—N/a	—N/a	—N/a	—N/a
2026	(bronze) Alwi Farhan	—N/a	(gold) Leo Rolly Carnando, Daniel Marthin; (bronze) Fajar Alfian, Muhammad Shohibul Fikri	—N/a	(silver) Amri Syahnawi, Nita Violina Marwah

=== Team ===
Year	Men's team		Women's team	
Year	Squads	Result	Squads	Result
1962	Tutang Djamaluddin; Liem Tjeng Kiang; Ferry Sonneville; Tan Joe Hok; Abdul Patah Unang	(gold) Winner	Goei Kiok Nio; Happy Herowati; Corry Kawilarang; Retno Kustijah; Minarni	(gold) Winner
1966		Quarter-finalist	Retno Kustijah; Minarni; Nurhaena; Tan Tjoe Ing	(bronze) Semi-finalist
1970	Indra Gunawan; Rudy Hartono; Indratno; Mintarja; Muljadi	(gold) Winner	Utami Dewi Kurniawan; Retno Kustijah; Minarni; Nurhaena; Poppy Tumengkol; Theresia Widiastuti	(bronze) Semi-finalist
1974	Ade Chandra; Christian Hadinata; Liem Swie King; Nunung Murdjianto; Tjun Tjun; Johan Wahjudi	(silver) Runner-up	Regina Masli; Minarni; Taty Sumirah; Theresia Widiastuti; Imelda Wiguna; Sri Wiyanti	(silver) Runner-up
1978	Ade Chandra; Christian Hadinata; Rudy Heryanto; Hariamanto Kartono; Liem Swie King; Iie Sumirat	(gold) Winner	Ruth Damayanti; Ivana Lie; Tjan So Gwan; Theresia Widiastuti; Imelda Wiguna; Verawaty Fadjrin	(silver) Runner-up
1982	Christian Hadinata; Wirawan Hadiyanto; Rudy Heryanto; Hariamanto Kartono; Liem Swie King; Icuk Sugiarto	(silver) Runner-up	Verawaty Fadjrin; Taty Sumirah; Ruth Damayanti; Maria Fransisca; Theresia Widiastuti; Elizabeth Latief	Quarter-finalist
1986	Bobby Ertanto; Christian Hadinata; Eddy Hartono; Eddy Kurniawan; Liem Swie King; Lius Pongoh; Icuk Sugiarto; Hadibowo Susanto	(bronze) Semi-finalist	Verawaty Fadjrin; Sarwendah Kusumawardhani; Elizabeth Latief; Ivana Lie; Rosiana Tendean; Imelda Wiguna	(bronze) Semi-finalist
1990	Alan Budikusuma; Rudy Gunawan; Eddy Hartono; Richard Mainaky; Aryono Miranat; Joko Suprianto; Hermawan Susanto; Ardy Wiranata	(bronze) Semi-finalist	Verawaty Fadjrin; Sarwendah Kusumawardhani; Lilik Sudarwati; Erma Sulistianingsih; Susi Susanti; Lili Tampi; Rosiana Tendean; Minarti Timur	(silver) Runner-up
1994	Hariyanto Arbi; Rudy Gunawan; Rexy Mainaky; Ricky Subagja; Bambang Suprianto; Joko Suprianto; Hermawan Susanto; Ardy Wiranata	(gold) Winner	Finarsih; Yuni Kartika; Eliza Nathanael; Ika Heny Nursanti; Zelin Resiana; Yuliani Sentosa; Susi Susanti; Lili Tampi	(silver) Runner-up
1998	Tony Gunawan; Hendrawan; Taufik Hidayat; Tri Kusharjanto; Rexy Mainaky; Budi Santoso; Ricky Subagja; Candra Wijaya	(gold) Winner	Mia Audina; Carmelita; Indarti Issolina; Cindana Hartono Kusuma; Deyana Lomban; Meiluawati; Eliza Nathanael; Minarti Timur	(bronze) Semi-finalist
2002	Rony Agustinus; Sigit Budiarto; Halim Haryanto; Hendrawan; Taufik Hidayat; Tri Kusharjanto; Marleve Mainaky; Bambang Suprianto; Nova Widianto; Candra Wijaya	(silver) Runner-up		Did not enter
2006	Luluk Hadiyanto; Taufik Hidayat; Markis Kido; Sony Dwi Kuncoro; Simon Santoso; Hendra Setiawan; Nova Widianto; Alvent Yulianto	(bronze) Semi-finalist	Fransisca Ratnasari; Jo Novita; Greysia Polii; Adriyanti Firdasari; Liliyana Natsir; Lita Nurlita; Pia Zebadiah Bernadet	Group stage
2010	Tontowi Ahmad; Mohammad Ahsan; Taufik Hidayat; Markis Kido; Sony Dwi Kuncoro; Fran Kurniawan; Dionysius Hayom Rumbaka; Simon Santoso; Hendra Setiawan; Alvent Yulianto	(bronze) Semi-finalist	Pia Zebadiah Bernadet; Lindaweni Fanetri; Adriyanti Firdasari; Shendy Puspa Irawati; Meiliana Jauhari; Maria Febe Kusumastuti; Nitya Krishinda Maheswari; Liliyana Natsir; Greysia Polii; Aprilia Yuswandari	(bronze) Semi-finalist
2014	Tommy Sugiarto; Hendra Setiawan; Mohammad Ahsan; Jonatan Christie; Angga Pratama; Rian Agung Saputro	Quarter-finalist	Lindaweni Fanetri; Greysia Polii; Nitya Krishinda Maheswari; Bellaetrix Manuputty	Quarter-finalist
2018	Tontowi Ahmad; Mohammad Ahsan; Fajar Alfian; Muhammad Rian Ardianto; Jonatan Christie; Marcus Fernaldi Gideon; Anthony Sinisuka Ginting; Ihsan Maulana Mustofa; Kevin Sanjaya Sukamuljo; Ricky Karanda Suwardi	(silver) Runner-up	Fitriani; Della Destiara Haris; Ruselli Hartawan; Ni Ketut Mahadewi Istarani; Liliyana Natsir; Greysia Polii; Rizki Amelia Pradipta; Apriyani Rahayu; Debby Susanto; Gregoria Mariska Tunjung	(bronze) Semi-finalist
2022	Anthony Sinisuka Ginting; Jonatan Christie; Chico Aura Dwi Wardoyo; Shesar Hiren Rhustavito; Fajar Alfian; Muhammad Rian Ardianto; Leo Rolly Carnando; Daniel Marthin; Rehan Naufal Kusharjanto; Rinov Rivaldy	Quarter-finalist	Komang Ayu Cahya Dewi; Febriana Dwipuji Kusuma; Lisa Ayu Kusumawati; Pitha Haningtyas Mentari; Amallia Cahaya Pratiwi; Apriyani Rahayu; Siti Fadia Silva Ramadhanti; Gregoria Mariska Tunjung; Putri Kusuma Wardani; Ester Nurumi Tri Wardoyo	Quarter-finalist
2026	Jonatan Christie; Alwi Farhan; Zaki Ubaidillah; Muhamad Yusuf; Fajar Alfian; Muhammad Shohibul Fikri; Nikolaus Joaquin; Leo Rolly Carnando; Daniel Marthin; Amri Syahnawi	(gold) Winner	Ni Kadek Dhinda Amartya Pratiwi; Siti Fadia Silva Ramadhanti; Febi Setianingrum; Nita Violina Marwah; Febriana Dwipuji Kusuma; Meilysa Trias Puspita Sari; Mutiara Ayu Puspitasari; Putri Kusuma Wardani; Rachel Allessya Rose; Thalita Ramadhani Wiryawan	(bronze) Semi-finalist

== Participation in Badminton Asia Championships ==
=== Individual competition ===
Rank	Country	62	65	69	71	76	83	85	87	89	91	92	93	94	95	96	97	98	99	00	01	02	03	04	05	06	07	08	09	10	11	12	13	14	15	16	17	18	19	22	23	24	Total
1	China					3	3	2^{2}				2^{3}		4	3	1	4	3	3	1	3	3				1	3	2^{5}	3	3	5	4	3	2^{6}	2	2	3	2^{7}	2	3	1	3	79
2	Indonesia	2		1^{1}	4	2					1	1				4	1			3	1	1	2^{4}	2	2	1	1	1	1						1					1	1	1	35
3	South Korea			1			2	2			3				1			2	2	1	1	1	2	3	1			2	1	1		1	2	2	1	1						1	34
4	Malaysia	3	0.5	1	1						1	2		1	1											2	1			1						1				1			16.5
5	Japan																																			1	1	2	3		1		8

BOLD highlights the overall winner therefore at that Asia Team Championships

^1 Indonesia won on superior of silver medal, thus, Indonesia became overall winner.
^2 China won on superior of silver medal to Korea, thus, China became overall winner.
^3 China won on superior of silver medal of three silver medals to Malaysia none, thus, China became overall winner.
^4 Indonesia won on superior of silver medal of four silver medals to South Korea one, thus, Indonesia became overall winner.
^5 China won on superior of silver medal of two silver medals to South Korea none, thus, China became overall winner.
^6 China won on superior of bronze medal of four bronze medals to South Korea one, thus, China became overall winner.
^7 China won on superior of bronze medal of four bronze medals to Japan none, thus, China became overall winner.

=== Men's team ===
Year	Statistics									Matches Form						Result	Ref
Year	Pld	W	L	MF	MA	MD	GF	GA	GD	GS		R16	QF	SF	F	Result	Ref
1962	3	2	1	8	7	+1	18	13	+5	—	—	—	North Borneo; W	Thailand; W	Malaya; L	(silver) Runner-up	
1965	Did not enter																
1969	4	4	0	14	6	+8	25	6	+19	—	—	Ceylon; W	Thailand; W	Philippines; W	Malaysia; W	(gold) Champions	
1971	3	3	0	13	2	+11	23	2	+21	—	—	—	South Korea; W	Japan; W	Malaysia; W	(gold) Champions	
1976	4	4	0	16	4	+12	33	5	+28	—	—	Nepal; W	Hong Kong; W	Malaysia; W	China; W	(gold) Champions	
1983	3	2	1	10	5	+5	15	7	+8	—	—	—	Brunei; W	India; L	Japan; W	(bronze) Third-place	
1985	4	3	1	15	5	+10	20	9	+11	—	—	Sri Lanka; W	Thailand; W	China; L	South Korea; W	(bronze) Third-place	
1987	2	1	1	5	3	+2	11	9	+3	—	—	—	—	Malaysia; W	China; L	(silver) Runner-up	
1989	4	3	1	15	5	+10	12	10	+2	North Korea; W	Japan; W	—	—	Malaysia; W	China; L	(silver) Runner-up	
1993	2	2	0	3	2	+1	12	4	+8	—	—	—	—	Malaysia; W	China; W	(gold) Champions	

== Participation in Badminton Asia Team and Mixed Team Championships ==
=== Men's team ===
Year	Statistics									Matches Form						Result	Ref
Year	Pld	W	L	MF	MA	MD	GF	GA	GD	GS			QF	SF	F	Result	Ref
2016	6	6	0	21	6	+15	44	20	+24	(Maldives); W	(Thailand); W	(Chinese Taipei); W	(Hong Kong); W	(India); W	(Japan); W	(gold) Champions	
2018	6	6	0	22	5	+17	47	16	+31	(Maldives); W	(Philippines); W	(India); W	(Japan); W	(South Korea); W	(China); W	(gold) Champions	
2020	4	4	0	13	4	+9	26	11	+15	—	—	(South Korea); W	(Philippines); W	(India); W	(Malaysia); W	(gold) Champions	
2022	5	4	1	13	10	+3	31	26	+5	(Hong Kong); W	(South Korea); W	(India); W	—	(Singapore); W	(Malaysia); L	(silver) Runners-up	
2024	4	2	2	14	6	+8	30	14	+16	(Saudi Arabia); W	(United Arab Emirates); W	(South Korea); L	(China); L	—	—	Quarter-finalists	
2026	4	3	1	12	7	+5	26	18	+8	—	(Myanmar); W	(Malaysia); W	(Thailand); W	(Japan); L	—	(bronze) Semi-finalists	

=== Women's team ===
Year	Statistics									Matches Form						Result	Ref
Year	Pld	W	L	MF	MA	MD	GF	GA	GD	GS			QF	SF	F	Result	Ref
2016	3	1	2	6	7	-1	14	15	-1	—	(Maldives); W	(South Korea); L	(China); L	—	—	Quarter-finalists	
2018	4	3	1	11	6	+5	25	14	+11	—	(Singapore); W	(China); W	(India); W	(Japan); L	—	(bronze) Semi-finalists	
2020	3	1	2	7	6	+1	16	13	+3	—	(Philippines); W	(Thailand); L	(Japan); L	—	—	Quarter-finalists	
2022	4	4	0	15	4	+11	32	9	+23	(Hong Kong); W	(Kazakhstan); W	(South Korea); W	—	(Japan) w/o	(South Korea); W	(gold) Champions	
2024	4	3	1	14	3	+11	28	11	+17	—	(Kazakhstan); W	(Hong Kong); W	(Malaysia); W	(Thailand); L	—	(bronze) Semi-finalists	
2026	4	2	2	10	9	+1	21	20	+1	—	(Hong Kong); W	(Japan); L	(Thailand); W	(South Korea); L	—	(bronze) Semi-finalists	

=== Mixed team ===
Year	Statistics									Matches Form							Result	Ref
Year	Pld	W	L	MF	MA	MD	GF	GA	GD	GS				QF	SF	F	Result	Ref
2017	3	2	1	10	5	+5	20	13	+7	(Sri Lanka); W	(Malaysia); W	—	—	(Japan); L	—	—	Quarter-finalists	
2019	4	3	1	12	4	+8	26	11	+15	(Sri Lanka); W	(Thailand); W	—	—	(Singapore); W	(Japan); L	—	(bronze) Semi-finalists	
2023	5	4	1	19	5	+14	40	12	+28	(Lebanon); W	(Syria); W	(Bahrain); W	(Thailand); W	(South Korea); L	—	—	Quarter-finalists	
2025	5	5	0	17	4	+11	32	13	+19	(Hong Kong); W	(Malaysia); W	—	—	(Chinese Taipei); W	(Thailand); W	(China); W	(gold) Champions	

== Participation in Southeast Asian Games ==
As of the 2025 Southeast Asian Games

Rank	Nation	Gold	Silver	Bronze	Total
1	Indonesia	122	83	48	253
2	Malaysia (MAS)	50	63	108	221
3	Thailand (THA)	40	61	112	213
4	Singapore (SGP)	3	9	57	69
5	Cambodia (CAM)	1	1	0	2
Totals (5 entries)		216	217	325	758

=== Team competition ===
==== Men's team ====
Year	Matches Form			Result	Ref
Year	QF	SF	F	Result	Ref
1977	—	(Singapore); W	(Thailand); W	(gold) Winners	
1979	—	Bye	(Malaysia); W	(gold) Winners	
1981	Bye	(Myanmar); W	(Malaysia); W	(gold) Winners	
1983	Bye	(Singapore); W	(Malaysia); W	(gold) Winners	
1985	Bye	(Singapore); W	(Malaysia); W	(gold) Winners	
1987	—	(Thailand); W	(Malaysia); W	(gold) Winners	
1989	(Laos); W	(Thailand); W	(Malaysia); L	(silver) Runners-up	
1991	Bye	(Thailand); W	(Malaysia); L	(silver) Runners-up	
1993	Bye	(Thailand); W	(Malaysia); W	(gold) Winners	
1995	—	(Myanmar); W	(Malaysia); W	(gold) Winners	
1997	Bye	(Philippines); W	(Malaysia); W	(gold) Winners	
1999	Bye	(Singapore); W	(Malaysia); W	(gold) Winners	
2001	Bye	(Thailand); W	(Malaysia); L	(silver) Runners-up	
2003	(Laos); W	(Malaysia); W	(Thailand); W	(gold) Winners	
2005	Bye	(Vietnam); W	(Malaysia); L	(silver) Runners-up	
2007	Bye	(Thailand); W	(Singapore); W	(gold) Winners	
2009	(Laos); W	(Thailand); W	(Malaysia); W	(gold) Winners	
2011	(Laos); W	(Thailand); W	(Malaysia); W	(gold) Winners	
2013	Did not conduct				
2015	Bye	(Malaysia); W	(Thailand); W	(gold) Winners	
2017	(Cambodia); W	(Thailand); W	(Malaysia); W	(gold) Winners	
2019	Bye	(Thailand); W	(Malaysia); W	(gold) Winners	
2021	(Cambodia); W	(Thailand); L	—	(bronze) Semi-finalists	
2023	Bye	(Singapore); W	(Malaysia); W	(gold) Winners	
2025	Bye	(Singapore); W	(Malaysia); W	(gold) Winners	

==== Women's team ====
Year	Matches Form			Result	Ref
Year	QF	SF	F	Result	Ref
1977	—	(Myanmar); W	(Malaysia); W	(gold) Winners	
1979	—	(Myanmar); W	(Thailand); W	(gold) Winners	
1981	—	(Philippines); W	(Thailand); W	(gold) Winners	
1983	—	(Malaysia); W	(Thailand); W	(gold) Winners	
1985	—	(Malaysia); W	(Thailand); W	(gold) Winners	
1987	—	(Thailand); W	(Malaysia); W	(gold) Winners	^{[a]}
1989	—	(Singapore); W	(Thailand); W	(gold) Winners	
1991	—	(Malaysia); W	(Thailand); W	(gold) Winners	
1993	—	(Malaysia); W	(Thailand); W	(gold) Winners	
1995	—	(Singapore); W	(Thailand); W	(gold) Winners	
1997	—	(Malaysia); W	(Thailand); W	(gold) Winners	
1999	—	(Vietnam); W	(Thailand); W	(gold) Winners	
2001	—	(Malaysia); W	(Thailand); W	(gold) Winners	
2003	—	(Thailand); L	—	(bronze) Semi-finalists	
2005	(Philippines); W	(Singapore); L	—	(bronze) Semi-finalists	
2007	—	(Thailand); W	(Singapore); W	(gold) Winners	
2009	—	(Singapore); W	(Malaysia); L	(silver) Runners-up	
2011	(Vietnam); W	(Malaysia); W	(Thailand); L	(silver) Runners-up	
2013	Did not conduct				
2015	—	(Malaysia); L	—	(bronze) Semi-finalists	
2017	—	(Malaysia); L	—	(bronze) Semi-finalists	
2019	(Vietnam); W	(Singapore); W	(Thailand); L	(silver) Runners-up	
2021	—	(Vietnam); W	(Thailand); L	(silver) Runners-up	
2023	(Cambodia); W	(Philippines); W	(Thailand); L	(silver) Runners-up	
2025	(Myanmar); W	(Malaysia); W	(Thailand); L	(silver) Runners-up	

^a — Only three teams competed in this event. The event was played in a round-robin basis.

== Junior competitive record ==
=== Suhandinata Cup ===
Year	Round	Pos
2000	Third place	3rd of 24
2002	Third place	3rd of 23
2004	Third place	3rd of 20
2006	Fourth place	4th of 28
2007	Group stage	6th of 25
2008	Group stage	7th of 21
2009	Group stage	5th of 21
2010	Fourth place	4th of 24
2011	Group stage	7th of 22
2012	Fourth place	4th of 30
2013	Runners-up	2nd of 30
2014	Runners-up	2nd of 33
2015	Runners-up	2nd of 39
2016	Quarter-finals	5th of 52
2017	Quarter-finals	5th of 44
2018	Semi-finals	3rd of 39
2019	Champions	1st of 43
2020	Cancelled because of COVID-19 pandemic	
2021	Cancelled because of COVID-19 pandemic	
2022	Semi-finals	3rd of 37
2023	Runners-up	2nd of 38
2024	Champions	1st of 39
2025	Runners-up	2nd of 36
2026	Semi-finals	3rd of 47

=== Asian Junior Team Championships ===
==== Men's team ====
Year	Result
1997	(silver) Runner-up
1998	(bronze) Semi-finalist
1999	(gold) Champions
2000	(silver) Runner-up
2001	(bronze) Semi-finalist
2002	(gold) Champions
2004	(bronze) Semi-finalist
2005	(bronze) Semi-finalist

==== Women's team ====
Year	Result
1997	(silver) Runner-up
1998	(bronze) Semi-finalist
1999	(silver) Runner-up
2000	Quarter-finalist
2001	(bronze) Semi-finalist
2002	
2004	(bronze) Semi-finalist
2005	(bronze) Semi-finalist

==== Mixed team ====
Year	Result
2006	(bronze) Semi-finalist
2007	(bronze) Semi-finalist
2008	Quarter-finalist
2009	Quarter-finalist
2010	(bronze) Semi-finalist
2011	(bronze) Semi-finalist
2012	Quarter-finalist
2013	(bronze) Semi-finalist
2014	Quarter-finalist
2015	(bronze) Semi-finalist
2016	Quarter-finalist
2017	(silver) Runner-up
2018	(bronze) Semi-finalist
2019	(silver) Runner-up
2023	(silver) Runner-up
2024	(bronze) Semi-finalist
2025	Quarter-finalist
2026	Quarter-finals

== Men's doubles supremacy ==
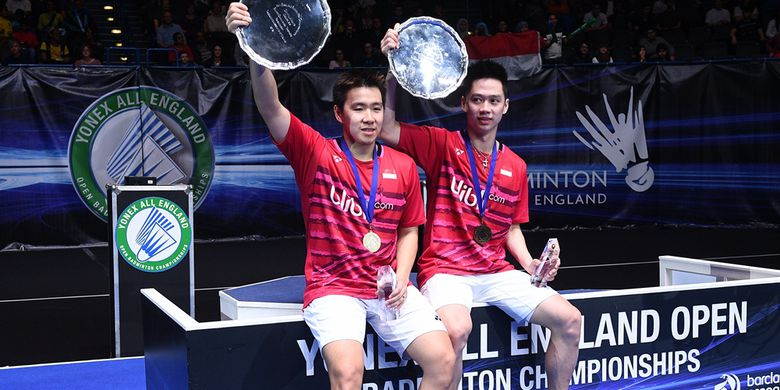
Kevin Sanjaya Sukamuljo and Marcus Fernaldi Gideon won the 2017 All England Open

Even though they actually have a balance of strength in all events, they are known for producing many great doubles in the men's category. Their doubles had conquered the Olympic Gold Medal, World Champion titles, All Englands and many open titles over decades. Among their greats are Tjun Tjun, Christian Hadinata, Eddy Hartono, Rexy Mainaky, Ricky Subagja, Candra Wijaya, Tony Gunawan, Sigit Budiarto, Markis Kido and Hendra Setiawan. Despite their domination, the national badminton governing body is also known for their awkward splitting decision. It happened twice in the Thomas Cup and thrice in the Olympics. Indonesia leads in total titles with fourteen. It won four consecutive titles from 1970 through 1979 and five consecutive titles from 1994 through 2002. Indonesia's ten-year reign as champions was ended by the resurgence of China in 2004 when the Chinese won the title in Jakarta. Indonesia has played in the decisive final tie (team match) on eighteen occasions. Since the Thomas Cup format was overhauled in 1984, it has failed to place among the top four teams only once, in 2012. In 1986, they chose to field King/Ertanto instead of the more solid King/Kartono, considering that Kartono always played badly against the Chinese. In 2004, they fielded weak doubles against strong Danish pairs. Because of those decisions, they lost the match. As for the Olympics, they didn't do anything to maintain the Halim/Tony partnership and Tony G quit the national team. They also split the Candra/Sigit combination months before the 2004 Games. Four years later in Beijing they deselected Tony G/Candra in favor of Luluk/Alvent. For the London Games, the same thing repeated once more due to their decision in deceiving reigning Olympics Gold Medalists Markis/Hendra. The 2005 edition also brought new faces in the mixed doubles event which had been dominated by China and Korea since 1997. With the retirement of defending champions and two-time winners Kim Dong-moon/Ra Kyung-min (Korea), Nova Widianto/Lilyana Natsir won Indonesia's first mixed doubles gold since 1980 when Christian Hadinata/Imelda Wiguna won it last for Indonesia. In 2020 after almost 20 years, Indonesia managed to become the champion of the Thomas Cup for the 14th time. This 14th title makes Indonesia the country with the most Thomas Cup titles.
