= Kawilarang =

Kawilarang is a Minahasan surname. Notable people with the surname include:

- Alexander Evert Kawilarang (1920–2000), Indonesian military commander
- Corry Kawilarang (born 1935), Indonesian badminton player
