= Badminton at the 1962 Asian Games – Women's team =

Women's team at the 1962 Asian Games
- Venue: Istora Gelora Bung Karno, Jakarta, Indonesia
- Dates: 24 – 25 August 1962

Medalists
gold medal	Indonesia; Goei Kiok Nio, Happy Herowati, Corry Kawilarang, Retno Kustijah, Minarni
silver medal	Malaya; Annie Keong, Kok Lee Ying, Jean Moey, Ng Mei Ling, Tan Gaik Bee
bronze medal	Thailand; Sumol Chanklum, Boopha Kaenthong, Prathin Pattabongse, Pratuang Pattabongse

The badminton women's team tournament at the 1962 Asian Games took place from 24 to 25 August at the Istora Senayan Indoor Stadium in Jakarta, Indonesia. Only four teams competed in this event.

== Schedule ==
All times are Western Indonesia Time (UTC+07:00)

Date	Time	Event
Friday, 24 August 1962	09:30	Semi-finals
Saturday, 25 August 1962	14:30	Bronze medal match
Saturday, 25 August 1962	19:00	Gold medal match

== Bracket ==
Semi-finals
Indonesia	3
Thailand	2
Japan	2
Malaya	3

Gold medal match
Indonesia	3
Malaya	2
Bronze medal match
Thailand	3
Japan	2

== Semi-finals ==
=== Indonesia vs Thailand ===
Indonesia
3
Istora Senayan
24 August 1962, 09:30

Thailand
2

			1	2	3
1	(Indonesia) (Thailand)	Minarni; Pratuang Pattabongse	11; 6	11; 5
2	(Indonesia) (Thailand)	Corry Kawilarang; Sumol Chanklum	11; 7	11; 0
3	(Indonesia) (Thailand)	Happy Herowati / Retno Koestijah; Boopha Kaenthong / Pratuang Pattabongse	15; 12	15; 6
4	(Indonesia) (Thailand)	Minarni; Sumol Chanklum				w/o
5	(Indonesia) (Thailand)	Corry Kawilarang; Pratuang Pattabongse				w/o

=== Malaya vs Japan ===
Malaya
3
Istora Senayan
24 August 1962, 09:30

Japan
2

			1	2	3
1	(Malaysia) (Japan)	Tan Gaik Bee; Fumiko Akiyama	11; 5	11; 6
2	(Malaysia) (Japan)	Kok Lee Ying; Michiko Tachibana	7; 11	7; 11
3	(Malaysia) (Japan)	Ng Mei Ling / Tan Gaik Bee; Michiko Tachibana / Keiko Toganoo	17; 15	15; 0
4	(Malaysia) (Japan)	Kok Lee Ying; Fumiko Akiyama	5; 11	1; 11
5	(Malaysia) (Japan)	Tan Gaik Bee; Michiko Tachibana	11; 7	11; 10

== Bronze medal match ==
=== Thailand vs Japan ===
Thailand
3
Istora Senayan
25 August 1962, 14:30

Japan
2

			1	2	3
1	(Thailand) (Japan)	Pratuang Pattabongse; Fumiko Akiyama
2	(Thailand) (Japan)	Sumol Chanklum; Michiko Tachibana
3	(Thailand) (Japan)	Boopha Kaenthong / Pratuang Pattabongse; Michiko Tachibana / Keiko Toganoo
4	(Thailand) (Japan)	Pratuang Pattabongse; Michiko Tachibana
5	(Thailand) (Japan)	Sumol Chanklum; Fumiko Akiyama

== Gold medal match ==
=== Indonesia vs Malaya ===
Indonesia
3
Istora Senayan
25 August 1962, 19:00

Malaya
0

			1	2	3
1	(Indonesia) (Malaysia)	Minarni; Tan Gaik Bee	11; 9	8; 11	11; 2
2	(Indonesia) (Malaysia)	Corry Kawilarang; Jean Moey
3	(Indonesia) (Malaysia)	Happy Herowati / Retno Koestijah; Ng Mei Ling / Tan Gaik Bee
4	(Indonesia) (Malaysia)	Minarni; Kok Lee Ying				w/o
5	(Indonesia) (Malaysia)	Corry Kawilarang; Tan Gaik Bee				w/o
