= Badminton at the 1962 Asian Games =

- Venue: Istora Senayan
- Dates: 25 August – 1 September
- Nations: 7

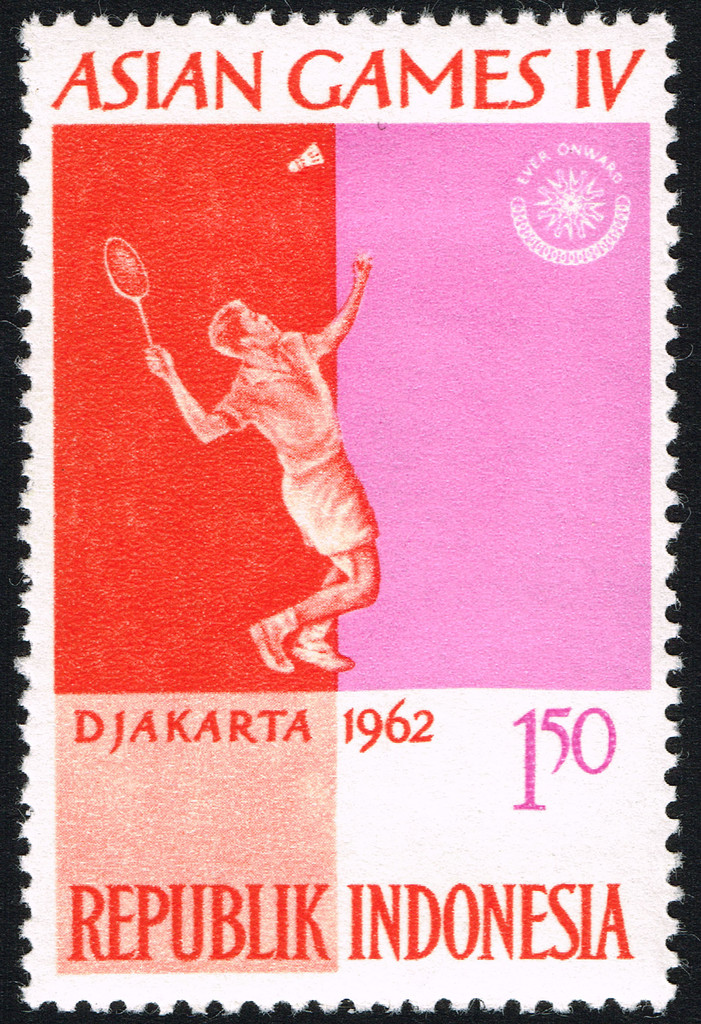
Badminton at the 1962 Asian Games on a stamp of Indonesia

Badminton tournament was held at the 1962 Asian Games at the Istora Senayan in Jakarta, Indonesia from 25 August to 1 September 1962.

The host nation, Indonesia won five out of six possible gold medals. Indonesia won both the team events; in men's team final Indonesian team defeated Thailand by 5-0 and in Women's team final they defeated the Malayan team by 3-2 scoreline.

== Medalists ==
Event	Gold	Silver	Bronze
Men's singles	Tan Joe Hok; Indonesia	Teh Kew San; Malaya	Ferry Sonneville; Indonesia
Men's doubles	Malaya; Tan Yee Khan; Ng Boon Bee	Indonesia; Tan Joe Hok; Liem Tjeng Kiang	Indonesia; Tutang Djamaluddin; Abdul Patah Unang
Men's team	Indonesia; Tutang Djamaluddin; Liem Tjeng Kiang; Ferry Sonneville; Tan Joe Hok; Abdul Patah Unang	Thailand; Narong Bhornchima; Raphi Kanchanaraphi; Channarong Ratanaseangsuang; Sangob Rattanusorn; Charoen Wattanasin	Malaya; Billy Ng; Ng Boon Bee; Tan Yee Khan; Teh Kew San; Yew Cheng Hoe
Women's singles	Minarni; Indonesia	Corry Kawilarang; Indonesia	Happy Herowati; Indonesia
Women's doubles	Indonesia; Minarni; Retno Kustijah	Indonesia; Corry Kawilarang; Happy Herowati	Malaya; Tan Gaik Bee; Ng Mei Ling
Women's team	Indonesia; Goei Kiok Nio; Happy Herowati; Corry Kawilarang; Retno Kustijah; Minarni	Malaya; Annie Keong; Kok Lee Ying; Jean Moey; Ng Mei Ling; Tan Gaik Bee	Thailand; Sumol Chanklum; Boobpa Kaentong; Prathin Pattabongs; Pratuang Pattabongs

== Final results ==
Discipline	Winner	Finalist	Score
Men's singles	(Indonesia) Tan Joe Hok	(Federation of Malaya) Teh Kew San	15–9, 15–3
Women's singles	(Indonesia) Minarni	(Indonesia) Corry Kawilarang	11–4, 7–11, 11–7
Men's doubles	(Federation of Malaya) Ng Boon Bee & Tan Yee Khan	(Indonesia) Tan Joe Hok & Liem Tjeng Kiang	15–13, 18–17
Women's doubles	(Indonesia) Minarni & Retno Kustijah	(Indonesia) Corry Kawilarang & Happy Herowati	9–15, 15–12, 15–6

== Medal table ==
Rank	Nation	Gold	Silver	Bronze	Total
1	Indonesia (INA)	5	3	3	11
2	Malaya (MAL)	1	2	2	5
3	Thailand (THA)	0	1	1	2
Totals (3 entries)		6	6	6	18

== Participating nations ==
- Cambodia
- Indonesia (10)
- Japan
- Malaya (10)
- Philippines
- Singapore
- Thailand
