= Happy Herowati =

Indonesian badminton player (born 1935)

Sport
- Sport: Badminton
Medal record
Women's badminton
Representing Indonesia
Uber Cup
Bronze medal – third place	1963 United States	Women's team
Asian Games
Gold medal – first place	1962 Jakarta	Women's team
Silver medal – second place	1962 Jakarta	Women's doubles
Bronze medal – third place	1962 Jakarta	Women's singles
Asian Championships
Gold medal – first place	1962 Kuala Lumpur	Women's doubles

Happy Herowati (born 1935) is an Indonesian badminton player who played in the 1960s.

== Career ==
Herowati became one of the early generations of Indonesian women's badminton in the 1960s and won the gold medal in the women's team, a silver in the women's doubles and a bronze in the singles at the 1962 Asian Games. In the 1962 Asian Badminton Championships, together with Corry Kawilarang, they won the women's doubles after defeating Thailand's women's doubles.

== Achievements ==
=== Asian Games ===
Women's singles
Year	Venue	Opponent	Score	Result
1962	Istora Senayan, Jakarta, Indonesia	(Japan) Keiko Toganoo		Bronze

Women's doubles
Year	Venue	Partner	Opponent	Score	Result	Ref.
1962	Istora Senayan, Jakarta, Indonesia	(Indonesia) Corry Kawilarang	(Indonesia) Retno Kustijah (Indonesia) Minarni	15–9, 12–15, 6–15	Silver	

=== Asian Championships ===
Women's doubles
Year	Venue	Partner	Opponent	Score	Result	Ref.
1962	Stadium Negara, Kuala Lumpur, Malaysia	(Indonesia) Corry Kawilarang	(Thailand) Sumol Chanklum (Thailand) Pankae Phongarn	16–18, 15–13, 15–3	Gold	
