= Minarni =

Indonesian badminton player (1944–2003)

Minarni Soedaryanto
Personal information
- Born: Minarni; 10 May 1944 Pasuruan, Dutch East Indies
- Died: 14 May 2003 (aged 59) Pertamina Central Hospital, South Jakarta, Indonesia

Sport
- Country: Indonesia
- Sport: Badminton
Medal record
Women's badminton
Representing Indonesia
World Masters Games
Gold medal – first place	1989 Denmark	Women's doubles 40+
Uber Cup
Gold medal – first place	1975 Jakarta	Women's team
Silver medal – second place	1969 Tokyo	Women's team
Bronze medal – third place	1963 United States	Women's team
Asian Games
Gold medal – first place	1962 Jakarta	Women's singles
Gold medal – first place	1962 Jakarta	Women's doubles
Gold medal – first place	1962 Jakarta	Women's team
Gold medal – first place	1966 Bangkok	Women's doubles
Silver medal – second place	1974 Tehran	Women's team
Bronze medal – third place	1966 Bangkok	Women's singles
Bronze medal – third place	1966 Bangkok	Mixed doubles
Bronze medal – third place	1966 Bangkok	Women's team
Bronze medal – third place	1970 Bangkok	Women's singles
Bronze medal – third place	1970 Bangkok	Mixed doubles
Bronze medal – third place	1970 Bangkok	Women's team
Asian Championships
Gold medal – first place	1962 Kuala Lumpur	Women's singles
Bronze medal – third place	1962 Kuala Lumpur	Women's doubles
GANEFO
Gold medal – first place	1963 Jakarta	Women's singles
Gold medal – first place	1963 Jakarta	Women's doubles
Silver medal – second place	1963 Jakarta	Women's team

Minarni (later Minarni Soedaryanto; 10 May 1944 – 14 May 2003) was an Indonesian badminton player who won major titles around the world and who represented her country internationally between 1959 and 1975. In 1968, Minarni became the first Indonesian to reach the final of women's singles at the All England Open, and with Retno Kustijah formed the first of only two Indonesian women's doubles teams yet to capture the All England Open title. She also won titles at the Indonesian National Championships, the quadrennial Asian Games, the Asian Championships, and at the Malaysia, U.S., Canada, and Singapore Opens. In 1966 Penang Open, Minarni won in all three available categories (women's singles, women's doubles and mixed doubles) in one day. Minarni first played in the then triennial Uber Cup competition for Indonesia in her mid teens (1959). In her last Uber Cup campaign (1974-1975), she was assigned as the team captain, and her excellent doubles play helped Indonesia to win its first women's world team title. 10 May 2019, on what would have been her 75th birthday, she was honored with a Google Doodle.

== Career ==
Her international career representing Indonesia lasted from 1959 to 1975, a span of sixteen years that made her the cornerstone of Indonesian women's badminton in the 1960s and early 1970s. During her playing career she was national champion in women's singles in 1963, 1964 and 1967, establishing domestic dominance that allowed her to represent Indonesia across every major international stage.

Her Asian Games story is central to her legacy. At the 1962 Asian Games in Jakarta at Istora Senayan, she achieved a historic double victory. She won the women's singles gold against her compatriot Corry Kawilarang in a hard-fought final with the scoreline 11–4, 7–11, 11–7, and then partnered with Retno Kustijah to win the women's doubles gold, overcoming Corry Kawilarang and Happy Herowati after losing the first game 9–15, 15–12, 15–6. Four years later at the 1966 Asian Games in Bangkok at Kittikachorn Stadium, she and Retno Kustijah defended their title with a convincing win over Japan's Hiroe Amano and Tomoko Takahashi 15–9, 15–6. At that same 1966 edition she also won bronze in women's singles after facing Japan's Noriko Takagi and bronze in mixed doubles with Wong Pek Sen, losing to Malaysia's Teh Kew San and Rosalind Singha Ang with a score of 15–3, 8–15, 6–15. At the 1970 Asian Games, again in Bangkok, she added two more bronzes, one in women's singles against Hiroe Yuki where the match ended 11–7, 8–7 retired, and one in mixed doubles with the great Rudy Hartono where the opponents Bandid Jaiyen and Achara Pattabongs won by walkover.

At the Asian Championships, she was champion at the inaugural edition in 1962 at Stadium Negara in Kuala Lumpur, Malaysia. She won women's singles gold against Thailand's Sumol Chanklum 11–7, 11–3, and took bronze in women's doubles alongside Wiwiek Dwi Kaeksi after a tight match against Thailand's Pankae Phongarn and Sumol Chanklum 1–15, 15–9, 11–15.

Her greatest impact on the world stage came at the All England Open Badminton Championships, then considered the unofficial world championship. In 1968 she made history by becoming the first Indonesian to reach the final of women's singles at the All England. In that same year she, together with Retno Kustijah, won the women's doubles title, a landmark achievement that made them the first Asian women and the first of only two Indonesian women's doubles pairs ever to capture the All England Open title. This partnership with Retno, who was also her sister-in-law, is still recalled as one of the most outstanding and dangerous doubles pairings the world has ever seen.

Minarni's longevity was most evident in the Uber Cup, the women's world team championship which was then contested every three years. She first played for Indonesia in her mid-teens in 1959 and went on to be selected for the teams of 1960, 1963, 1966, 1969 and finally 1974–1975, making her the longest-serving player in Indonesian Uber Cup history. In her last Uber Cup campaign in 1974–1975 she was appointed team captain as a playing captain, and her excellent doubles play was instrumental in guiding Indonesia to its first ever Uber Cup trophy, defeating Japan 5–2 in the final in Jakarta before she retired that same year.

After retiring as a player in 1975, she did not leave the sport. She worked as a national coach at the Indonesian national training center from 1977 to 1984 and was active in the Badminton Association of Indonesia organization, where she trained a new generation including 1982 Asian Games gold medalist Ivana Lie. Her contributions on and off the court were honored by the International Badminton Federation with the Meritorious Service Award in 1986. She also remained competitive as a veteran athlete, winning gold in women's doubles in the 40+ category at the World Masters Games in 1989 held in Aarhus, Aalborg and Herning in Denmark, partnered with Eva Stuart against opponents Ulla Strand and Kirsten Jorgensen.

== Awards and nominations ==
Award	Year	Category	Result	Ref.
International Badminton Federation Awards	1986	Meritorious Service Award	Honored	

== Achievements ==
=== World Masters Games ===
Women's doubles

Year	Age	Venue	Partner	Opponent	Score	Result	Ref
1989	40+	Aarhus, Aalborg, Herning; Denmark	(Sweden) Eva Stuart	(Denmark) Ulla Strand (Denmark) Kirsten Jørgensen		Gold	

=== Asian Games ===
Women's singles
Year	Venue	Opponent	Score	Result	Ref.
1962	Istora Senayan, Jakarta, Indonesia	(Indonesia) Corry Kawilarang	11–4, 7–11, 11–7	Gold	
1966	Kittikachorn Stadium, Bangkok, Thailand	(Japan) Noriko Takagi	1–11, 7–11	Bronze	
1970	Kittikachorn Stadium, Bangkok, Thailand	(Japan) Hiroe Yuki	11–7, 8–7 retired	Bronze	

Women's doubles
Year	Venue	Partner	Opponent	Score	Result	Ref.
1962	Istora Senayan; Jakarta, Indonesia	(Indonesia) Retno Kustijah	(Indonesia) Corry Kawilarang (Indonesia) Happy Herowati	9–15, 15–12, 15–6	Gold	
1966	Kittikachorn Stadium; Bangkok, Thailand	(Indonesia) Retno Kustijah	(Japan) Hiroe Amano (Japan) Tomoko Takahashi	15–9, 15–6	Gold	

Mixed doubles
Year	Venue	Partner	Opponent	Score	Result	Ref.
1966	Kittikachorn Stadium; Bangkok, Thailand	(Indonesia) Wong Pek Sen	(Malaysia) Teh Kew San (Malaysia) Rosalind Singha Ang	15–3, 8–15, 6–15	Bronze	
1970	Kittikachorn Stadium; Bangkok, Thailand	(Indonesia) Rudy Hartono	(Thailand) Bandid Jaiyen (Thailand) Achara Pattabongs	Walkover	Bronze	

=== Asian Championships ===
Women's singles
Year	Venue	Opponent	Score	Result	Ref.
1962	Stadium Negara, Kuala Lumpur, Malaysia	(Thailand) Sumol Chanklum	11–7, 11–3	Gold	

Women's doubles
Year	Venue	Partner	Opponent	Score	Result	Ref.
1962	Stadium Negara; Kuala Lumpur, Malaysia	(Indonesia) Wiwiek Dwi Kaeksi	(Thailand) Pankae Phongarn (Thailand) Sumol Chanklum	1–15, 15–9, 11–15	Bronze	

=== International tournaments (20 titles, 4 runners-up) ===
Women's singles
Year	Tournament	Opponent	Score	Result	Ref.
1960	Malaysia Open	(Indonesia) Retno Kustijah	Walkover	(gold) Winner	
1965	Den Haag Championships	(Indonesia) Corry Kawilarang	11–4, 11–4	(gold) Winner	
1966	Malaysia Open	(Indonesia) Retno Kustijah	11–5, 8–11, 11–1	(gold) Winner	
1966	Penang Open	(Indonesia) Retno Kustijah	12–10, 12–10	(gold) Winner	
1966	Perak Open	(Indonesia) Retno Kustijah	11–7, 11–9	(gold) Winner	
1967	Malaysia Open	(Indonesia) Retno Kustijah	11–4, 11–7	(gold) Winner	
1967	Singapore Open	(Indonesia) Retno Kustijah	5–11, 11–6, retired	(gold) Winner	
1968	All England Open	(Sweden) Eva Twedberg	6–11, 2–11	(silver) Runner-up	
1969	U.S. Open	(Denmark) Pernille Mølgaard Hansen	11–1, 11–2	(gold) Winner	

Women's doubles
Year	Tournament	Partner	Opponent	Score	Result
1960	Malaysia Open	(Indonesia) Retno Kustijah	(Malaysia) Tan Gaik Bee (Malaysia) Cecilia Samuel	5–15, 12–15	(silver) Runner-up
1966	Malaysia Open	(Indonesia) Retno Kustijah	(Indonesia) Megah Idawati (Indonesia) Tan Tjung Ing	15–5, 15–5	(gold) Winner
1966	Penang Open	(Indonesia) Retno Kustijah	(Indonesia) Megah Idawati (Indonesia) Tan Tjung Ing	15–9, 15–4	(gold) Winner
1966	Perak Open	(Indonesia) Retno Kustijah	(Indonesia) Megah Idawati (Indonesia) Tan Tjung Ing	15–1, 15–10	(gold) Winner
1967	Malaysia Open	(Indonesia) Retno Kustijah	(Malaysia) Rosalind Singha Ang (Malaysia) Teoh Siew Yong	15–7, 15–1	(gold) Winner
1967	Singapore Open	(Indonesia) Retno Kustijah	(Japan) Hiroe Amano (Japan) Noriko Takagi	15–6, 18–13	(gold) Winner
1968	All England Open	(Indonesia) Retno Kustijah	(Japan) Hiroe Amano (Japan) Noriko Takagi	15–5, 15–6	(gold) Winner
1969	Canada Open	(Indonesia) Retno Kustijah	(Canada) Barbara Hood (Canada) Marjory Shedd	15–3, 15–6	(gold) Winner
1969	U.S. Open	(Indonesia) Retno Kustijah	(United States) Tyna Barinaga (United States) Helen Tibbetts	15–6, 15–6	(gold) Winner
1970	Singapore Open	(Indonesia) Retno Kustijah	(Malaysia) Rosalind Singha Ang (Malaysia) Teoh Siew Yong	15–11, 15–4	(gold) Winner

Mixed doubles
Year	Tournament	Partner	Opponent	Score	Result
1966	Penang Open	(Indonesia) Abdul Patah Unang	(Malaysia) Eddy Choong (Malaysia) Rosalind Singha Ang	15–13, 15–9	(gold) Winner
1966	Perak Open	(Malaysia) Eddy Choong	(Malaysia) Tan Yee Khan (Indonesia) Retno Kustijah	9–15, 11–15	(silver) Runner-up
1967	Malaysia Open	(Indonesia) Darmadi	(Indonesia) Tan Joe Hok (Indonesia) Retno Kustijah	9–15, 8–15	(silver) Runner-up
1967	Singapore Open	(Indonesia) Darmadi	(Malaysia) Ng Boon Bee (Malaysia) Rosalind Singha Ang	15–4, 15-5	(gold) Winner
1969	Canada Open	(Indonesia) Darmadi	(Malaysia) Ng Boon Bee (Indonesia) Retno Kustijah	15–5, 17–15	(gold) Winner

=== Invitational tournament ===
Women's doubles
Year	Tournament	Partner	Opponent	Score	Result	Ref.
1974	World Invitational Championships	(Indonesia) Regina Masli	(Denmark) Lene Køppen (Netherlands) Joke van Beusekom	15–7, 15–8	Gold	

=== GANEFO ===
Women's singles
Year	Venue	Opponent	Score	Result	Ref.
1963	Istora Senayan, Jakarta, Indonesia	(China) Liang Xiaomu	10–12, 11–1, 11–1	Gold	

Women's doubles
Year	Tournament	Partner	Opponent	Score	Result	Ref.
1963	Istora Senayan, Jakarta, Indonesia	(Indonesia) Retno Kustijah	(China) Liang Xiaomu (China) Chen Yuniang	15–7, 15–3	Gold	

=== Other tournament ===
Year	Tournament	Partner	Opponent	Score	Result	Ref.
1983	Veterans Tournament (30+)	(Indonesia) Imelda Wiguna	(Japan) Noriko Nakayama (Japan) Hiroe Amano	15–3, ret	(gold) Winner	
