= Retno Kustijah =

Indonesian badminton player (born 1942)

Personal information
- Born: Retno Koestijah; 19 June 1942 (age 84) Karanganyar, Kebumen, Dutch East Indies

Sport
- Country: Indonesia
- Sport: Badminton
Medal record
Women's badminton
Representing Indonesia
Uber Cup
| Silver medal – second place | 1969 Tokyo | Women's team |
| Silver medal – second place | 1972 Tokyo | Women's team |
| Bronze medal – third place | 1963 United States | Women's team |
Asian Games
| Gold medal – first place | 1962 Jakarta | Women's doubles |
| Gold medal – first place | 1962 Jakarta | Women's team |
| Gold medal – first place | 1966 Bangkok | Women's doubles |
| Silver medal – second place | 1970 Bangkok | Women's doubles |
| Bronze medal – third place | 1966 Bangkok | Mixed doubles |
| Bronze medal – third place | 1966 Bangkok | Women's team |
| Bronze medal – third place | 1970 Bangkok | Women's team |
Asian Championships
| Gold medal – first place | 1971 Jakarta | Women's doubles |
| Gold medal – first place | 1971 Jakarta | Mixed doubles |
GANEFO
| Gold medal – first place | 1963 Jakarta | Women's doubles |
| Silver medal – second place | 1963 Jakarta | Women's team |

Retno Kustijah (born 19 June 1942; as Retno Koestijah) is an Indonesian badminton player who competed internationally from the early 1960s to the early 1970s.

== Career ==
Though she played singles in high level events, Kustijah's greatest success came in the women's doubles with regular partner Minarni. They were the first of only two Indonesian teams to win women's doubles at the prestigious All England Championships (1968). Their titles together included the quadrennial Asian Games (1962, 1966), and the Malaysia (1966, 1967), Singapore (1967), New Zealand (1968), Canadian (1969), and U.S. (1969) Opens. Kustijah also won mixed doubles at the 1967 Malaysia Open with Tan Joe Hok and at the 1971 Asian Championships with Christian Hadinata. She was a member of Indonesian teams which finished second to Japan in the 1969 and 1972 Uber Cup (women's world team) championships.

== Awards and nominations ==
| Award | Year | Category | Result | Ref. |
|---|---|---|---|---|
| International Badminton Federation Awards | 1986 | Meritorious Service Awards | Honored | |

== Achievements ==
=== Asian Games ===
Women's doubles
| Year | Venue | Partner | Opponent | Score | Result |
|---|---|---|---|---|---|
| 1962 | Istora Senayan, Jakarta, Indonesia | (Indonesia) Minarni | (Indonesia) Happy Herowati (Indonesia) Corry Kawilarang | 9–15, 15–12, 15–6 | Gold |
| 1966 | Kittikachorn Stadium, Bangkok, Thailand | (Indonesia) Minarni | (Japan) Hiroe Amano (Japan) Tomoko Takahashi | 15–9, 15–6 | Gold |
| 1970 | Kittikachorn Stadium, Bangkok, Thailand | (Indonesia) Nurhaena | (Japan) Machiko Aizawa (Japan) Etsuko Takenaka | 11–15, 6–15 | Silver |

Mixed doubles
| Year | Venue | Partner | Opponent | Score | Result |
|---|---|---|---|---|---|
| 1966 | Kittikachorn Stadium, Bangkok, Thailand | (Indonesia) Tjoa Tjong Boan | (Malaysia) Eddy Choong (Malaysia) Tan Gaik Bee | 15–6, 16–17, 9–15 | Bronze |

=== Asian Championships ===
Women's doubles
| Year | Venue | Partner | Opponent | Score | Result |
|---|---|---|---|---|---|
| 1971 | Istora Senayan, Jakarta, Indonesia | (Indonesia) Intan Nurtjahja | (Indonesia) Regina Masli (Indonesia) Poppy Tumengkol | 15–13, 15–6 | Gold |

Mixed doubles
| Year | Tournament | Partner | Opponent | Score | Result |
|---|---|---|---|---|---|
| 1971 | Istora Senayan, Jakarta, Indonesia | (Indonesia) Christian Hadinata | (Indonesia) Indra Gunawan (Indonesia) Intan Nurtjahja | 18–13, 15–5 | Gold |

=== International tournaments (12 titles, 8 runners-up) ===
Women's singles
| Year | Tournament | Opponent | Score | Result |
|---|---|---|---|---|
| 1960 | Malaysia Open | (Indonesia) Minarni | Walkover | (silver) Runner-up |
| 1966 | Malaysia Open | (Indonesia) Minarni | 5–11, 11–8, 1–11 | (silver) Runner-up |
| 1966 | Perak Open | (Indonesia) Minarni | 7–11, 9–11 | (silver) Runner-up |
| 1967 | Malaysia Open | (Indonesia) Minarni | 4–11, 7–11 | (silver) Runner-up |
| 1967 | Singapore Open | (Indonesia) Minarni | 11–5, 6–11, retired | (silver) Runner-up |
| 1969 | Canadian Open | (Sweden) Eva Twedberg | 1–11, 2–11 | (silver) Runner-up |

Women's doubles
| Year | Tournament | Partner | Opponent | Score | Result |
|---|---|---|---|---|---|
| 1960 | Malaysia Open | (Indonesia) Minarni | (Malaysia) Tan Gaik Bee (Malaysia) Cecilia Samuel | 5–15, 12–15 | (silver) Runner-up |
| 1966 | Malaysia Open | (Indonesia) Minarni | (Indonesia) Megah Idawati (Indonesia) Tan Tjung Ing | 15–5, 15–5 | (gold) Winner |
| 1966 | Penang Open | (Indonesia) Minarni | (Indonesia) Megah Idawati (Indonesia) Tan Tjung Ing | 15–9, 15–4 | (gold) Winner |
| 1966 | Perak Open | (Indonesia) Minarni | (Indonesia) Megah Idawati (Indonesia) Tan Tjung Ing | 15–1, 15–10 | (gold) Winner |
| 1967 | Malaysia Open | (Indonesia) Minarni | (Malaysia) Rosalind Singha Ang (Malaysia) Teoh Siew Yong | 15–7, 15–1 | (gold) Winner |
| 1967 | Singapore Open | (Indonesia) Minarni | (Japan) Hiroe Amano (Japan) Noriko Takagi | 15–6, 18–13 | (gold) Winner |
| 1968 | All England Open | (Indonesia) Minarni | (Japan) Hiroe Amano (Japan) Noriko Takagi | 15–5, 15–6 | (gold) Winner |
| 1969 | Canadian Open | (Indonesia) Minarni | (Canada) Barbara Hood (Canada) Marjory Shedd | 15–3, 15–6 | (gold) Winner |
| 1969 | U.S. Open | (Indonesia) Minarni | (United States) Tyna Barinaga (United States) Helen Tibbetts | 15–6, 15–6 | (gold) Winner |
| 1970 | Singapore Open | (Indonesia) Minarni | (Malaysia) Rosalind Singha Ang (Malaysia) Teoh Siew Yong | 15–11, 15–4 | (gold) Winner |

Mixed doubles
| Year | Tournament | Partner | Opponent | Score | Result |
|---|---|---|---|---|---|
| 1966 | Malaysia Open | (Indonesia) Abdul Patah Unang | (Malaysia) Eddy Choong (Malaysia) Rosalind Singha Ang | 9–8, retired | (gold) Winner |
| 1966 | Perak Open | (Malaysia) Tan Yee Khan | (Malaysia) Eddy Choong (Indonesia) Minarni | 15–9, 15–11 | (gold) Winner |
| 1967 | Malaysia Open | (Indonesia) Tan Joe Hok | (Indonesia) Darmadi (Indonesia) Minarni | 15–9, 15–8 | (gold) Winner |
| 1969 | Canadian Open | (Malaysia) Ng Boon Bee | (Indonesia) Darmadi (Indonesia) Minarni | 5–15, 15–17 | (silver) Runner-up |

=== Other tournament ===
Women's doubles
| Year | Tournament | Partner | Opponent | Score | Result | Ref. |
|---|---|---|---|---|---|---|
| 1963 | GANEFO | (Indonesia) Minarni | (China) Liang Xiaomu (China) Chen Yuniang | 15–7, 15–3 | Gold | |
