= Corry Kawilarang =

Indonesian badminton player (born 1935)

Personal information
- Born: 1935 (age 90–91) South Sulawesi, Dutch East Indies

Sport
- Country: Indonesia
- Sport: Badminton
- Event: Women's singles & doubles
Medal record
Women's badminton
Representing Indonesia
Uber Cup
Bronze medal – third place	1963 United States	Women's team
Asian Games
Gold medal – first place	1962 Jakarta	Women's team
Silver medal – second place	1962 Jakarta	Women's singles
Silver medal – second place	1962 Jakarta	Women's doubles
Asian Championships
Gold medal – first place	1962 Kuala Lumpur	Women's doubles
Bronze medal – third place	1962 Kuala Lumpur	Mixed's doubles

Corry Kawilarang (born 1935) is an Indonesian badminton player from the 1960s.

== Personal life ==
Kawilarang married Sutjahjo (Sucahyo) in 1966 and they have two children.

== Career ==
In 1962, Kawilarang won the gold medal in the women's doubles with Happy Herowati and a bronze in the mixed doubles with Kho Han Tjiang at the first Asian Championships held in Kuala Lumpur, Malaysia. In the 1962 Asian Games, she managed to win the silver medals in the women's singles and doubles. She also part of Indonesia gold medalists in the women's team event at the 1962 Asian Games.

Kawilarang was part of Indonesia Uber Cup squad in 1960, 1963 and 1966. In 1963, the team reached the second round (big three) losing to England. At the 1966 Uber Cup, the team was eliminated in the first round to eventual champion Japan.

== Achievements ==
=== Asian Games ===
Women's singles
Year	Venue	Opponent	Score	Result	Ref.
1962	Istora Senayan, Jakarta, Indonesia	(Indonesia) Minarni	4–11, 11–7, 7–11	Silver	

Women's doubles
Year	Venue	Partner	Opponent	Score	Result	Ref.
1962	Istora Senayan, Jakarta, Indonesia	(Indonesia) Happy Herowati	(Indonesia) Retno Kustijah (Indonesia) Minarni	15–9, 12–15, 6–15	Silver	

=== Asian Championships ===
Women's doubles
Year	Venue	Partner	Opponent	Score	Result	Ref.
1962	Stadium Negara, Kuala Lumpur, Malaysia	(Indonesia) Happy Herowati	(Thailand) Sumol Chanklum (Thailand) Pankae Phongarn	16–18, 15–13, 15–3	Gold	

Mixed doubles
Year	Venue	Partner	Opponent	Score	Result	Ref.
1962	Stadium Negara, Kuala Lumpur, Malaysia	(Indonesia) Kho Han Tjiang	(Malaysia) Lim Say Hup (Malaysia) Ng Mei Ling	3–15, 4–15	Bronze	

=== International tournament (1 runner-up) ===
Women's singles
Year	Tournament	Opponent	Score	Result	Ref.
1965	Den Haag Championships	(Indonesia) Minarni	4–11, 4–11	(silver) Runner-up	
