= 1958 Thomas Cup knockout stage =

Badminton tournament

The knockout stage for the 1958 Thomas Cup began on 5 June 1958 with the first-round knockout and ended on 15 June with the final tie.

== Qualified teams ==
The teams that won their zonal tie qualified for the final knockout stage.

Group	Winners
CH	Malaya
AS	Thailand
AM	United States
AU	Indonesia
EU	Denmark

== Bracket ==
First round
Malaya
Bye
5 June 1958 – Singapore
United States	2
Thailand	7
7 June 1958 – Singapore
Indonesia	6
Denmark	3

Second round
Malaya
Bye
10 June 1958 – Singapore
Thailand	1
Indonesia	8

Challenge round
14 June 1958 – Singapore
Malaya	3
Indonesia	6

== First round ==
The results of the inter-zone ties in Singapore gave ample evidence of both the growing popularity of the sport in the Far East and the advantage these nations enjoyed competing against "outsiders" in a tropical climate. Showing strength and balance in singles and doubles, Thailand sent the USA home with a 7–2 defeat. A curiously revealing match in this tie was the victory of Thailand's Sunthorn Subabandhu and Kamal Sudthivanich over the strong U.S. veterans Alston and Rogers, 18–14 in the third game after dropping the first game at zero.

More stunning, and ominous for Malaya, was newcomer Indonesia's 6–3 victory over a highly rated Danish contingent. Erland Kops was beaten by both the internationally experienced Ferry Sonneville and by young sensation Tan Joe Hok. Even the powerful Danish doubles pairing of Finn Kobbero and Jorgen Hammergaard Hansen could earn only a split in two matches.

=== United States vs Thailand ===
United States
2
Singapore Badminton Stadium, Singapore
5–6 June 1958

Thailand
7

			1	2	3
1	(United States) (Thailand)	Ron Palmer; Charoen Wattanasin	15; 10	4; 15	8; 15
2	(United States) (Thailand)	Jim Poole; Thanoo Khadjadbhye	5; 15	17; 16	3; 15
3	(United States) (Thailand)	Joey Alston / Wynn Rogers; Sunthorn Subabandhu / Kamal Sudthivanich	15; 0	7; 15	14; 18
4	(United States) (Thailand)	Manny Armendariz / Michael Hartgrove; Charoen Wattanasin / Prida Wongakrakul	4; 15	15; 12	2; 15
5	(United States) (Thailand)	Manny Armendariz; Pinit Pattabongse	6; 15	9; 15
6	(United States) (Thailand)	Jim Poole; Charoen Wattanasin	9; 15	6; 15
7	(United States) (Thailand)	Ron Palmer; Thanoo Khadjadbhye	2; 15	15; 13		retired
8	(United States) (Thailand)	Manny Armendariz / Michael Hartgrove; Sunthorn Subabandhu / Kamal Sudthivanich	9; 15	9; 15
9	(United States) (Thailand)	Joey Alston / Wynn Rogers; Charoen Wattanasin / Prida Wongakrakul	15; 12	15; 6

=== Denmark vs Indonesia ===
Denmark
3
Singapore Badminton Stadium, Singapore
7–8 June 1958

Indonesia
6

			1	2	3
1	(Denmark) (Indonesia)	Finn Kobberø; Ferry Sonneville	18; 13	15; 7
2	(Denmark) (Indonesia)	Erland Kops; Tan Joe Hok	8; 15	5; 15
3	(Denmark) (Indonesia)	Jørgen Hansen / Finn Kobberø; Njoo Kiem Bie / Tan King Gwan	15; 5	11; 15	14; 18
4	(Denmark) (Indonesia)	Ole Mertz / Poul-Erik Nielsen; Lie Poo Djian / Tan Joe Hok	14; 18	15; 13	2; 15
5	(Denmark) (Indonesia)	Finn Kobberø; Tan Joe Hok	15; 1	12; 15	10; 15
6	(Denmark) (Indonesia)	Erland Kops; Ferry Sonneville	12; 15	9; 15
7	(Denmark) (Indonesia)	Palle Granlund; Eddy Yusuf	15; 8	15; 9
8	(Denmark) (Indonesia)	Jørgen Hansen / Finn Kobberø; Lie Poo Djian / Tan Joe Hok	15; 6	15; 8
9	(Denmark) (Indonesia)	Erland Kops / Ole Mertz; Njoo Kiem Bie / Tan King Gwan	11; 15	15; 10	11; 15

== Second round ==
=== Indonesia vs Thailand ===
Indonesia went on to comfortably defeat Thailand in the inter-zone final 8–1. In another bad sign for Malaya, Thailand 's top two singles players, Charoen Wattanasin and Thanoo Khajadbhye, respected internationals who had dropped only one singles match between them in the campaign prior to playing Indonesia, were each decisively beaten by both Sonneville and Tan Joe Hok. Thailand won one doubles, though all four of these matches went to three games.

Indonesia
8
Singapore Badminton Stadium, Singapore
10–11 June 1958

Thailand
1

			1	2	3
1	(Indonesia) (Thailand)	Tan Joe Hok; Charoen Wattanasin	15; 10	15; 6
2	(Indonesia) (Thailand)	Ferry Sonneville; Thanoo Khadjadbhye	11; 5	13; 7
3	(Indonesia) (Thailand)	Njoo Kiem Bie / Tan King Gwan; Sunthorn Subabandhu / Kamal Sudthivanich	15; 12	8; 15	15; 5
4	(Indonesia) (Thailand)	Lie Poo Djian / Tan Joe Hok; Charoen Wattanasin / Prida Wongakrakul	7; 15	15; 9	15; 10
5	(Indonesia) (Thailand)	Ferry Sonneville; Charoen Wattanasin	15; 10	15; 2
6	(Indonesia) (Thailand)	Eddy Yusuf; Pinit Pattabongse	15; 10			retired
7	(Indonesia) (Thailand)	Tan Joe Hok; Thanoo Khadjadbhye	15; 1	15; 8
8	(Indonesia) (Thailand)	Njoo Kiem Bie / Tan King Gwan; Charoen Wattanasin / Prida Wongakrakul	15; 8	11; 15	15; 8
9	(Indonesia) (Thailand)	Lie Poo Djian / Tan Joe Hok; Sunthorn Subabandhu / Kamal Sudthivanich	15; 6	3; 15	0; 15

== Challenge round ==
=== Malaya vs Indonesia ===
The challenge round played in the middle of June brought Malaya's nine year Thomas Cup reign to an end. With Wong Peng Soon and Ong Poh Lim retired, Eddie Choong's game showing recent vulnerability, and some controversy over the selection of team members still percolating, Malayan confidence might have been low from the start. The three-time defending champions were unable to win any of the singles matches against Indonesia and eventually lost the tie 3–6.

Choong was twice beaten routinely in straight games and was booed off the court by his countrymen. Malaya's other top singles player, Teh Kew San, nearly broke through against Sonneville but finally went down 16–18 in the third. At least one of Malaya's doubles wins appeared to be a gift after the outcome had been determined. Indonesia's Tan Joe Hok went through the entire Thomas Cup campaign undefeated in singles (Sonneville had dropped a match to Finn Kobbero). Tan would win the All-England singles title the following year and for a time would be regarded as the best player in the world. For a much longer time Indonesia would be the country to beat in international team badminton.

Malaya
3
Singapore Badminton Stadium, Singapore
14–15 June 1958

Indonesia
6

			1	2	3
1	(Malaysia) (Indonesia)	Eddy Choong; Ferry Sonneville	12; 15	4; 15
2	(Malaysia) (Indonesia)	Teh Kew San; Tan Joe Hok	14; 18	4; 15
3	(Malaysia) (Indonesia)	Johnny Heah / Lim Say Hup; Njoo Kiem Bie / Tan King Gwan	15; 7	8; 15	15; 18
4	(Malaysia) (Indonesia)	Eddy Choong / Ooi Teik Hock; Ferry Sonneville / Tan Joe Hok	18; 15	15; 5
5	(Malaysia) (Indonesia)	Eddy Choong; Tan Joe Hok	11; 15	6; 15
6	(Malaysia) (Indonesia)	Teh Kew San; Ferry Sonneville	15; 13	13; 15	16; 18
7	(Malaysia) (Indonesia)	Abdullah Piruz; Eddy Yusuf	15; 6	10; 15	8; 15
8	(Malaysia) (Indonesia)	Eddy Choong / Ooi Teik Hock; Njoo Kiem Bie / Tan King Gwan	13; 15	15; 9		retired
9	(Malaysia) (Indonesia)	Johnny Heah / Lim Say Hup; Ferry Sonneville / Tan Joe Hok	15; 1	15; 1
