= 1958 Thomas Cup squads =

This article lists the squads for the 1958 Thomas Cup participating teams. The age listed for each player is on 5 June 1958 which was the first day of the tournament.

== Teams ==
=== Denmark ===
Six players represented Denmark in the 1958 Thomas Cup.

Name	DoB/Age
Finn Kobberø	13 March 1936 (aged 22)
Jørgen Hammergaard Hansen	1930 (aged 27–28)
Erland Kops	14 January 1937 (aged 21)
Poul-Erik Nielsen	10 April 1931 (aged 27)
Poul Christensen	1928 (aged 29–30)
Palle Granlund	1930 (aged 27–28)
Ole Mertz	26 November 1931 (aged 23)

=== Indonesia ===
Six players represented Indonesia in the 1958 Thomas Cup.

Name	DoB/Age
Tan Joe Hok	11 August 1937 (aged 20)
Ferry Sonneville	3 January 1931 (aged 27)
Njoo Kiem Bie	17 September 1927 (aged 30)
Tan King Gwan	1932 (aged 25–26)
Eddy Yusuf	3 April 1931 (aged 27)
Lie Poo Djian	25 August 1932 (aged 25)

=== Malaya ===
Six players represented Malaya in the 1958 Thomas Cup.

Name	DoB/Age
Eddy Choong	29 May 1931 (aged 27)
Teh Kew San	26 January 1935 (aged 23)
Johnny Heah	15 January 1932 (aged 26)
Lim Say Hup	1935 (aged 22–23)
Ooi Teik Hock	13 November 1920 (aged 37)
Abdullah Piruz	14 September 1929 (aged 28)

=== Thailand ===
Six players represented Thailand in the 1958 Thomas Cup.

Name	DoB/Age
Thanoo Khadjadbhye	1935 (aged 22–23)
Charoen Wattanasin	4 April 1937 (aged 21)
Pinit Pattabongse	1933 (aged 24–25)
Sunthorn Subabandhu	1922 (aged 35–36)
Kamal Sudthivanich	1931 (aged 26–27)
Prida Wongakrakul	1932 (aged 25–26)

=== United States ===
Six players represented the United States in the 1958 Thomas Cup.

Name	DoB/Age
Ron Palmer	1931 (aged 26–27)
Jim Poole	20 February 1932 (aged 26)
Manuel Armendariz	1934 (aged 23–24)
Michael Hartgrove	1934 (aged 23–24)
Thomas Wynn Rogers	1919 (aged 38–39)
Joe Alston	20 December 1926 (aged 31)
