= 1958 Thomas Cup qualification =

Tournament details
- Dates: 19 July 1957 – 27 March 1958
- Location: Asian zone: Bangkok; Colombo; Hong Kong; Rangoon American zone: Long Beach; European zone: Belfast; Borås; Copenhagen; Le Havre Australasian zone: Invercargill; Melbourne

The qualifying process for the 1958 Thomas Cup took place from 19 July 1957 to 27 March 1958 to decide the final teams which will play in the final tournament.

== Qualification process ==
The qualification process is divided into four regions, the Asian Zone, the American Zone, the European Zone and the Australasian Zone. Teams in their respective zone will compete in a knockout format. Teams will compete for two days, with two singles and doubles played on the first day and three singles and two doubles played on the next day. The teams that win their respective zone will earn a place in the final tournament to be held in Singapore.

Malaya were the champions of the last Thomas Cup, therefore the team automatically qualified for the inter-zone play-offs.

=== Qualified teams ===
Country	Qualified as	Qualified on	Final appearance
Malaya	1955 Thomas Cup winners	6 May 1955	4th
Thailand	Asian Zone winners	27 March 1958	1st
Denmark	European Zone winners	11 March 1958	4th
United States	American Zone winners	1 March 1958	4th
Indonesia	Australasian Zone winners	18 October 1957	1st

== Asian Zone ==
=== Bracket ===
First round
19 July 1957 – Bangkok
Thailand	8
India	1
21 July 1957 – Colombo
Japan	9
Ceylon	0
25 September 1957 – Hong Kong
Pakistan	7
Hong Kong	2
Bye
Burma

Semi-finals
November 1957 – Bangkok
Thailand	w/o
Japan
5 October 1957 – Rangoon
Pakistan	8
Burma	1

Final
26 March 1958 – Bangkok
Thailand	9
Pakistan	0

=== First round ===
India
1
Bangkok, Thailand
19–20 July 1957

Thailand
8

			1	2	3
1	(India) (Thailand)	Nandu Natekar; Charoen Wattanasin	12; 15	9; 15
2	(India) (Thailand)	Trilok Nath Seth; Thanoo Khadjadbhye	6; 15	7; 15
3	(India) (Thailand)	P.S. Chawla / Amrit Lal Dewan; Sunthorn Subabandhu / Kamal Sudthivanich	7; 15	12; 15
4	(India) (Thailand)	Nandu Natekar / R. D. Vimawala; Charoen Wattanasin / Prida Wongakrakul	6; 15	16; 17
5	(India) (Thailand)	Amrit Lal Dewan; Pinit Pattabongse	15; 8	15; 4
6	(India) (Thailand)	Trilok Nath Seth; Charoen Wattanasin	17; 15	6; 15	6; 15
7	(India) (Thailand)	Nandu Natekar; Thanoo Khadjadbhye	15; 7	8; 15	2; 15
8	(India) (Thailand)	P.S. Chawla / Amrit Lal Dewan; Charoen Wattanasin / Prida Wongakrakul	8; 15	7; 15
9	(India) (Thailand)	Nandu Natekar / R. D. Vimawala; Sunthorn Subabandhu / Kamal Sudthivanich	6; 15	2; 15

Japan
9
Colombo, Ceylon
21–22 July 1957

Ceylon
0

			1	2	3
1	(Japan) (Dominion of Ceylon)	Kanetoshi Kataishi; Nagalingam Rasalingam	15; 9	15; 8
2	(Japan) (Dominion of Ceylon)	Yoshirō Satō; Sam Schoorman	15; 5	15; 3
3	(Japan) (Dominion of Ceylon)	Kanetoshi Kataishi / Eiichi Nagai; Coomaraswamy Rajalingam / A. R. L. Wijesekera	15; 0	15; 2
4	(Japan) (Dominion of Ceylon)	Hiroshi Koshikawa / Yoshirō Satō; Raife Jansz / Peethamparam Sivalingam	15; 13	15; 7
5	(Japan) (Dominion of Ceylon)	Eiichi Nagai; Coomaraswamy Rajalingam	15; 3	15; 0
6	(Japan) (Dominion of Ceylon)	Yoshirō Satō; Nagalingam Rasalingam	15; 7	15; 9
7	(Japan) (Dominion of Ceylon)	Kanetoshi Kataishi; Sam Schoorman	15; 4	15; 0
8	(Japan) (Dominion of Ceylon)	Hiroshi Koshikawa / Yoshirō Satō; Coomaraswamy Rajalingam / A. R. L. Wijesekera	15; 3	15; 10
9	(Japan) (Dominion of Ceylon)	Kanetoshi Kataishi / Eiichi Nagai; Raife Jansz / Peethamparam Sivalingam	15; 4	15; 2

Pakistan
7
Hong Kong
25–26 September 1957

Hong Kong
2

			1	2	3
1	(Pakistan) (Hong Kong)	Nazir Rajput; Mohamed Abbas Ebrahim	15; 2	15; 0
2	(Pakistan) (Hong Kong)	Irshad Ahmed; George Ma	15; 1	15; 10
3	(Pakistan) (Hong Kong)	Wajahat Ali / Masood Khan; Mohamed Abbas Ebrahim / Wong Wai Hung	12; 15	12; 15
4	(Pakistan) (Hong Kong)	Irshad Ahmed / Nazir Rajput; George Ma / Siu Chuen	15; 5	15; 3
5	(Pakistan) (Hong Kong)	Akram Baig; Lee Wing Foon	15; 12	15; 6
6	(Pakistan) (Hong Kong)	Irshad Ahmed; Mohamed Abbas Ebrahim	15; 5	13; 18	15; 9
7	(Pakistan) (Hong Kong)	Nazir Rajput; George Ma	15; 3	13; 15	15; 12
8	(Pakistan) (Hong Kong)	Wajahat Ali / Masood Khan; George Ma / Siu Chuen	15; 4	15; 6
9	(Pakistan) (Hong Kong)	Irshad Ahmed / Nazir Rajput; Mohamed Abbas Ebrahim / Wong Wai Hung	8; 15	11; 15

=== Semi-finals ===
Pakistan
8
Rangoon, Burma
5–6 October 1957

Burma
1

			1	2	3
1	(Pakistan) (Myanmar)	Nazir Rajput; Mya Maung	15; 4	15; 2
2	(Pakistan) (Myanmar)	Irshad Ahmed; Khin Maung Aye	15; 2	15; 3
3	(Pakistan) (Myanmar)	Wajahat Ali / Masood Khan; Philip Gaudoin / Aung Myint	15; 13	15; 9
4	(Pakistan) (Myanmar)	Irshad Ahmed / Nazir Rajput; Khin Maung Aye / Tin Yee	14; 18	4; 15
5	(Pakistan) (Myanmar)	Akram Baig; Philip Gaudoin	15; 1	15; 11
6	(Pakistan) (Myanmar)	Irshad Ahmed; Mya Maung	15; 3	15; 2
7	(Pakistan) (Myanmar)	Nazir Rajput; Khin Maung Aye	15; 11	15; 7
8	(Pakistan) (Myanmar)	Wajahat Ali / Masood Khan; Khin Maung Aye / Tin Yee	15; 9	17; 14
9	(Pakistan) (Myanmar)	Irshad Ahmed / Nazir Rajput; Philip Gaudoin / Aung Myint	15; 13	9; 15	15; 7

=== Final ===
Thailand
9
Bangkok, Thailand
26–27 March 1958

Pakistan
0

			1	2	3
1	(Thailand) (Pakistan)	Charoen Wattanasin; Nazir Rajput	15; 11	15; 5
2	(Thailand) (Pakistan)	Thanoo Khadjadbhye; Shamshad Ali	15; 5	15; 3
3	(Thailand) (Pakistan)	Sunthorn Subabandhu / Kamal Sudthivanich; Wajahat Ali / Masood Khan	15; 8	15; 9
4	(Thailand) (Pakistan)	Charoen Wattanasin / Prida Wongakrakul; Shamshad Ali / Irshad Ahmed	15; 3	15; 8
5	(Thailand) (Pakistan)	Pinit Pattabongse; Akram Baig	17; 15	8; 15	15; 7
6	(Thailand) (Pakistan)	Charoen Wattanasin; Shamshad Ali	15; 13	15; 1
7	(Thailand) (Pakistan)	Thanoo Khadjadbhye; Nazir Rajput	15; 5	15; 5
8	(Thailand) (Pakistan)	Charoen Wattanasin / Prida Wongakrakul; Wajahat Ali / Masood Khan	15; 4	17; 16
9	(Thailand) (Pakistan)	Sunthorn Subabandhu / Kamal Sudthivanich; Shamshad Ali / Irshad Ahmed	15; 3	15; 3

== American Zone ==
=== Bracket ===
Final
28 February 1958 – Long Beach
United States	9
Canada	0

=== Final ===
United States
9
Long Beach, United States
28 February – 1 March 1958

Canada
0

			1	2	3
1	(United States) (Canada)	Jim Poole; James Carnwath	15; 11	15; 7
2	(United States) (Canada)	Ron Palmer; David McTaggart	15; 6	15; 0
3	(United States) (Canada)	Joey Alston / Wynn Rogers; Bill Purcell / Beverley Westcott	15; 3	15; 6
4	(United States) (Canada)	Manuel Armendariz / Michael Hartgrove; Bert Fergus / Donald Smythe	8; 15	15; 2	15; 9
5	(United States) (Canada)	Manuel Armendariz; Beverley Westcott	15; 5	15; 11
6	(United States) (Canada)	Ron Palmer; James Carnwath	15; 7	15; 3
7	(United States) (Canada)	Jim Poole; David McTaggart	15; 2	15; 9
8	(United States) (Canada)	Manuel Armendariz / Michael Hartgrove; Bill Purcell / Beverley Westcott	15; 11	15; 13
9	(United States) (Canada)	Joey Alston / Wynn Rogers; Bert Fergus / Donald Smythe	15; 0	15; 8

== European Zone ==
=== Bracket ===
First round
Ireland
Bye
16 November 1957 – Le Havre
England	9
France	0
19 November 1957 – Borås
Sweden	9
Scotland	0
Bye
Denmark

Semi-finals
31 January 1958 – Belfast
Ireland	1
England	8
9 January 1958 – Copenhagen
Sweden	0
Denmark	9

Final
10 March 1958 – Copenhagen
England	2
Denmark	7

=== First round ===
England
9
Le Havre, France
16–17 November 1957

France
0

			1	2	3
1	(England) (France)	Anthony Jordan; Ghislain Vasseur	15; 4	15; 3
2	(England) (France)	Hugh Findlay; Paul Ailloud	15; 1	15; 2
3	(England) (France)	John Best / Anthony Jordan; Ghislain Vasseur / Pierre Lenoir	15; 8	15; 4
4	(England) (France)	John D. McColl / F. John Shaw; Paul Ailloud / Maurice Mathieu	15; 3	15; 7
5	(England) (France)	Anthony Jordan; Paul Ailloud	15; 2	15; 4
6	(England) (France)	Hugh Findlay; Ghislain Vasseur	15; 6	15; 5
7	(England) (France)	John Timperley; Denis Vasseur	15; 10	15; 7
8	(England) (France)	John Best / Anthony Jordan; Paul Ailloud / Maurice Mathieu	15; 7	15; 2
9	(England) (France)	John D. McColl / F. John Shaw; Ghislain Vasseur / Pierre Lenoir	15; 6	15; 3

Sweden
9
Borås, Sweden
19–20 November 1957

Scotland
0

			1	2	3
1	(Sweden) (Scotland)	Bertil Glans; Robert S. McCoig	15; 11	15; 9
2	(Sweden) (Scotland)	Berndt Dahlberg; John Barrie	15; 0	15; 3
3	(Sweden) (Scotland)	Knut Malmgren / Bo Nilsson; Mac Henderson / Donald Ross	15; 2	15; 5
4	(Sweden) (Scotland)	Bertil Glans / Berndt Dahlberg; Robert S. McCoig / W. Frank Shannon	15; 8	17; 14
5	(Sweden) (Scotland)	Bertil Glans; John Barrie	15; 6	15; 12
6	(Sweden) (Scotland)	Berndt Dahlberg; Robert S. McCoig	15; 2	15; 2
7	(Sweden) (Scotland)	Bo Nilsson; W. Frank Shannon	15; 8	15; 4
8	(Sweden) (Scotland)	Bertil Glans / Berndt Dahlberg; Mac Henderson / Donald Ross	18; 15	17; 14
9	(Sweden) (Scotland)	Knut Malmgren / Bo Nilsson; Robert S. McCoig / W. Frank Shannon	15; 5	15; 5

=== Semi-finals ===
England
8
Belfast, Northern Ireland
31 January – 1 February 1958

Ireland
1

			1	2	3
1	(England) (Republic of Ireland)	John Timperley; James Doyle	15; 7	8; 15	10; 15
2	(England) (Republic of Ireland)	Hugh Findlay; Graham Henderson	15; 10	15; 4
3	(England) (Republic of Ireland)	John Best / Anthony Jordan; Kenneth Carlisle / Jim Fitzgibbon	15; 13	18; 16
4	(England) (Republic of Ireland)	Hugh Findlay / John Timperley; Graham Henderson / Charles McCormack	15; 5	15; 8
5	(England) (Republic of Ireland)	Hugh Findlay; James Doyle	15; 2	15; 7
6	(England) (Republic of Ireland)	John Timperley; Graham Henderson	15; 10	15; 13
7	(England) (Republic of Ireland)	Peter Waddell; Charles McCormack	5; 15	15; 4	15; 4
8	(England) (Republic of Ireland)	John Best / Anthony Jordan; Graham Henderson / Charles McCormack	15; 7	15; 3
9	(England) (Republic of Ireland)	Hugh Findlay / John Timperley; Kenneth Carlisle / Jim Fitzgibbon	15; 3	15; 18	15; 7

Denmark
9
Copenhagen, Denmark
9–10 January 1958

Sweden
0

			1	2	3
1	(Denmark) (Sweden)	Finn Kobberø; Bertil Glans	15; 5	15; 5
2	(Denmark) (Sweden)	Erland Kops; Berndt Dahlberg	15; 11	15; 10
3	(Denmark) (Sweden)	Poul-Erik Nielsen / John Nygaard; Bo Nilsson / Göran Wahlqvist	15; 6	17; 5
4	(Denmark) (Sweden)	Jørgen Hansen / Finn Kobberø; Bertil Glans / Berndt Dahlberg	15; 6	15; 5
5	(Denmark) (Sweden)	Erland Kops; Bertil Glans	18; 15	15; 2
6	(Denmark) (Sweden)	Finn Kobberø; Berndt Dahlberg	11; 15	15; 4	15; 7
7	(Denmark) (Sweden)	Palle Granlund; Ingemar Eliasson	11; 15	15; 1	15; 7
8	(Denmark) (Sweden)	Jørgen Hansen / Finn Kobberø; Bo Nilsson / Göran Wahlqvist	15; 7	15; 4
9	(Denmark) (Sweden)	Poul-Erik Nielsen / John Nygaard; Bertil Glans / Berndt Dahlberg	14; 17	15; 6	15; 7

=== Final ===
Denmark
7
Copenhagen, Denmark
10–11 March 1958

England
2

			1	2	3
1	(Denmark) (England)	Erland Kops; Hugh Findlay	15; 12	15; 1
2	(Denmark) (England)	Finn Kobberø; John Timperley	15; 4	15; 8
3	(Denmark) (England)	Poul-Erik Nielsen / John Nygaard; John Best / Anthony Jordan	9; 15	15; 9	5; 15
4	(Denmark) (England)	Jørgen Hansen / Finn Kobberø; Hugh Findlay / John Timperley	15; 3	15; 9
5	(Denmark) (England)	Finn Kobberø; Hugh Findlay	15; 5	15; 4
6	(Denmark) (England)	Erland Kops; John Timperley	15; 2	15; 10
7	(Denmark) (England)	Palle Granlund; Peter Waddell	11; 15	15; 4	15; 3
8	(Denmark) (England)	Jørgen Hansen / Finn Kobberø; John Best / Anthony Jordan	15; 7	15; 8
9	(Denmark) (England)	Poul-Erik Nielsen / John Nygaard; Hugh Findlay / John Timperley	15; 17	15; 9	13; 15

== Australasian Zone ==
=== Bracket ===
Semi-finals
11 October 1957 – Invercargill
Indonesia	9
New Zealand	0
Bye
Australia

Final
17 October 1957 – Melbourne
Indonesia	9
Australia	0

=== Semi-finals ===
Indonesia
9
Invercargill, New Zealand
11–12 October 1957

New Zealand
0

			1	2	3
1	(Indonesia) (New Zealand)	Olich Solihin; Paul Skelt	15; 3	15; 3
2	(Indonesia) (New Zealand)	Tan Joe Hok; Alban M. Stephens	15; 3	15; 0
3	(Indonesia) (New Zealand)	Lie Poo Djian / Tan Joe Hok; Anthony T. Skelt / Paul Skelt	15; 9	15; 7
4	(Indonesia) (New Zealand)	Njoo Kiem Bie / Tan King Gwan; Alban M. Stephens / Neale R. Thompson	15; 0	15; 4
5	(Indonesia) (New Zealand)	Olich Solihin; Alban M. Stephens	15; 6	15; 2
6	(Indonesia) (New Zealand)	Lie Poo Djian; Anthony T. Skelt	15; 3	15; 8
7	(Indonesia) (New Zealand)	Tan Joe Hok; Paul Skelt	15; 3	15; 3
8	(Indonesia) (New Zealand)	Lie Poo Djian / Tan Joe Hok; Alban M. Stephens / Neale R. Thompson	15; 5	15; 13
9	(Indonesia) (New Zealand)	Njoo Kiem Bie / Tan King Gwan; Anthony T. Skelt / Paul Skelt	15; 2	15; 7

=== Final ===
Indonesia
9
Melbourne, Australia
17–18 October 1957

Australia
0

			1	2	3
1	(Indonesia) (Australia)	Tan Joe Hok; Ken Turner	15; 4	15; 12
2	(Indonesia) (Australia)	Olich Solihin; Don Murray	11; 4	13; 12
3	(Indonesia) (Australia)	Njoo Kiem Bie / Tan King Gwan; Cliff Cutt / Ian Hutchinson	15; 9	15; 11
4	(Indonesia) (Australia)	Lie Poo Djian / Tan Joe Hok; Ken Turner / Geoffrey Underhill	15; 5	15; 10
5	(Indonesia) (Australia)	Lie Poo Djian; Ron Young	15; 2	15; 1
6	(Indonesia) (Australia)	Tan Joe Hok; Don Murray	15; 5	15; 7
7	(Indonesia) (Australia)	Olich Solihin; Ken Turner	15; 2	15; 6
8	(Indonesia) (Australia)	Lie Poo Djian / Tan Joe Hok; Cliff Cutt / Ian Hutchinson	15; 8	5; 15	15; 3
9	(Indonesia) (Australia)	Njoo Kiem Bie / Tan King Gwan; Ken Turner / Geoffrey Underhill	15; 12	15; 5
