= 1961 Thomas Cup squads =

This article lists the squads for the 1961 Thomas Cup participating teams. The age listed for each player is on 1 June 1961 which was the first day of the tournament.

== Teams ==
=== Australia ===
Five players represented Australia in the 1961 Thomas Cup.

Name	DoB/Age
Ken Turner	20 August 1933 (aged 27)
Don Murray	18 July 1929 (aged 31)
Ron Young	1940 (aged 20–21)
Ted Anderson	1939 (aged 21–22)
George Robotham	1935 (aged 25–26)

=== Denmark ===
Six players represented Denmark in the 1961 Thomas Cup.

Name	DoB/Age
Finn Kobberø	13 March 1936 (aged 25)
Jørgen Hammergaard Hansen	1930 (aged 27–28)
Erland Kops	14 January 1937 (aged 24)
Poul-Erik Nielsen	10 April 1931 (aged 30)
Knud Aage Nielsen	1 March 1937 (aged 24)
Henning Borch	9 March 1938 (aged 23)

=== Indonesia ===
Six players represented Indonesia in the 1961 Thomas Cup.

Name	DoB/Age
Tan Joe Hok	11 August 1937 (aged 23)
Ferry Sonneville	3 January 1931 (aged 30)
Njoo Kiem Bie	17 September 1927 (aged 33)
Tan King Gwan	1932 (aged 28–29)
Eddy Yusuf	3 April 1931 (aged 30)
Lie Poo Djian	25 August 1932 (aged 28)

=== Thailand ===
Six players represented Thailand in the 1961 Thomas Cup.

Name	DoB/Age
Channarong Ratanaseangsuang	1939 (aged 21–22)
Somsook Boonyasukhanonda	1937 (aged 23–24)
Narong Bhornchima	1938 (aged 22–23)
Raphi Kanchanaraphi	6 November 1936 (aged 24)
Chavalert Chumkum	1939 (aged 21–22)
Chuchart Vatanatham	1937 (aged 23–24)

=== United States ===
Six players represented the United States in the 1961 Thomas Cup.

Name	DoB/Age
Bill Berry	1928 (aged 32–33)
Ron Palmer	1931 (aged 29–30)
Jim Poole	20 February 1932 (aged 29)
Michael Hartgrove	1934 (aged 26–27)
Thomas Wynn Rogers	1919 (aged 41–42)
Joe Alston	20 December 1926 (aged 34)
