= 1963 All England Badminton Championships =

1963 All England Championships
Tournament details
- Dates: 19 March 1963– 23 March 1963
- Edition: 53rd
- Venue: Wembley Arena
- Location: London

Champions
- Men's singles: (Denmark) Erland Kops
- Women's singles: (United States) Judy Hashman
- Men's doubles: (Denmark) Finn Kobberø (Denmark) Jørgen Hammergaard Hansen
- Women's doubles: (United States) Judy Hashman (Republic of Ireland) Sue Peard
- Mixed doubles: (Denmark) Finn Kobberø (Denmark) Ulla Rasmussen

The 1963 All England Championships was a badminton tournament held at Wembley Arena, London, England, from 19–23 March 1963.

== Final results ==
Category	Winners	Runners-up	Score
Men's singles	(Denmark) Erland Kops	(Thailand) Channarong Ratanaseangsuang	15-7, 15-7
Women's singles	(United States) Judy Hashman	(England) Angela Bairstow	11-5, 11-9
Men's doubles	(Denmark) Finn Kobberø & Jørgen Hammergaard Hansen	(Indonesia) Ferry Sonneville & Tan Joe Hok	10-15, 15-4, 15-7
Women's doubles	(United States) Judy Hashman & (Republic of Ireland) Sue Peard	(Denmark) Karin Jørgensen & Ulla Rasmussen	15-6 15-9
Mixed doubles	(Denmark) Finn Kobberø & Ulla Rasmussen	(England) Tony Jordan & June Timperley	15-8, 15-12

== Men's singles ==
=== Section 1 ===
Round of 32
1	(Denmark) Erland Kops	15	15
(England) Tony Pears	10	9
(Denmark) Jorgen Mortensen	15	15
(England) Bill Havers	12	11
(Thailand) Sangob Rattanusorn +	15	15
(England) John Hamilton	2	1
(England) Bill Andrew	15	13	15
(Malaysia) R T Ponnampalam	12	15	10
(Denmark) Knut Aage Nielsen	15	15
(England) John Stanford	10	7
(England) Michael Rawlings	15	15
(Scotland) Robert Fowlis	3	7
(Malaysia) Ong Chong Jin	15	15
(South Africa) Dave Powell	9	0
(Indonesia) Ferry Sonneville	15	15
(Scotland) Jim Sydie	4	5

Round of 16
1	(Denmark) Kops	15	15
(Denmark) Mortensen	2	9
(Thailand) Rattanusorn	15	15
(England) Andrew	2	1
(Denmark) Nielsen	15	15
(England) Rawlings	3	6
(Malaysia) Chong Jin	15	15
(Indonesia) Sonneville	7	10

Quarter-finals
1	(Denmark) Kops	14	15	15
(Thailand) Rattanusorn	17	9	10
(Denmark) Nielsen	15	9	15
(Malaysia) Chong Jin	12	15	10

Semi-finals
1	(Denmark) Kops	15	15
(Denmark) Nielsen	10	6

=== Section 2 ===
Round of 32
(Thailand) Channarong Ratanaseangsuang +	15	15
(Norway) Hans Sperre	2	0
(Denmark) Finn Kobberø	15	18
(Malaysia) Lee Kin Tat	7	17
(Denmark) Hans Henrik Svendsen	15	15
(Belgium) Ton Verstoep	8	3
(Scotland) Frank Shannon	14	17	15
(Canada) James Carnwath	18	14	13
(Indonesia) Tan Joe Hok	7	15	15
(Scotland) Bob McCoig	15	10	10
(England) B Beardsworth	w/o
(England) Hugh Findlay
(Japan) Yoshio Komiya	15	15
(England) David Rowe	13	11
2	(Denmark) Henning Borch	15	15
(England) Peter Waddell	11	7

Round of 16
(Thailand) Channarong	15	15
(Denmark) Kobberø	1	2
(Denmark) Svendsen	15	15
(Scotland) Shannon	1	3
(Indonesia) Tan Joe Hok	15	15
(England) Beardsworth	1	10
(Japan) Komiya	6	15	17
2	(Denmark) Borch	15	13	15

Quarter-finals
(Thailand) Channarong	18	15
(Denmark) Svendsen	16	5
(Indonesia) Tan Joe Hok	15	15
(Japan) Komiya	7	2

Semi-finals
(Thailand) Channarong	15	15
(Indonesia) Tan Joe Hok	8	10

== Women's singles ==
=== Section 1 ===
Round of 32
(United States) Judy Hashman +	11	11
(England) A H Larman	2	1
(Scotland) Muriel Ferguson	11	11
(Denmark) Anne Flindt	0	1
(England) Iris Rogers +	11	11
(England) Gaynor Simpson	2	6
(Denmark) Inger Kjaergaard	12	11
(England) B M Parish	11	6
(Republic of Ireland) Mary O'Sullivan +	11	11
(Denmark) Anette Rye	7	0
(New Zealand) Val Gow	12	11
(England) M J Frost	11	4
(Denmark) Karin Jørgensen	11	11
(England) Julie Charles	2	6
(England) Jenny Pritchard	11	11
(West Germany) Irmgard Latz	6	9

Round of 16
(United States) Hashman	11	11
(Scotland) Ferguson	1	5
(England) Rogers	11	11
(Denmark) Kjaergaard	3	4
(Republic of Ireland) O'Sullivan	11	11
(New Zealand) Gow	0	1
(Denmark) Jørgensen	3	11	11
(England) Pritchard	11	8	2

Quarter-finals
(United States) Hashman	11	11
(England) Rogers	8	4
(Republic of Ireland) O'Sullivan	5	11	11
(Denmark) Jørgensen	11	5	7

Semi-finals
(United States) Hashman	11	11
(Republic of Ireland) O'Sullivan	1	2

=== Section 2 ===
Round of 32
(England) Angela Bairstow +	11	11
(England) Margaret Boxall	2	7
(New Zealand) Gilda Tompkins	4	11	11
(England) Anita Price	11	9	3
(Denmark) Ulla Rasmussen +	11	11
(Scotland) D G Calder	2	2
(Republic of Ireland) Sue Peard	11	11
(England) Phyllis Kirkwood	7	3
(England) Ursula Smith +	11	11
(England) M Govett	6	3
(England) J S Swinstead	11	11
(New Zealand) Margaret Moorhead	5	8
(Denmark) Bente Flindt	11	11
(England) Stephanie Jones	5	6
(Republic of Ireland) Yvonne Kelly	11	12
(West Germany) Heide Hau	0	9

Round of 16
(England) Bairstow	11	11
(New Zealand) Tompkins	4	6
(Denmark) Rasmussen	11	11
(Republic of Ireland) Peard	4	8
(England) Smith	11	11
(England) Swinstead	9	0
(Denmark) Flindt	11	11
(Republic of Ireland) Kelly	4	3

Quarter-finals
(England) Bairstow	11	11
(Denmark) Rasmussen	1	2
(England) Smith	11	11
(Denmark) Flindt	7	6

Semi-finals
(England) Bairstow	11	6	11
(England) Smith	0	11	5

+ seeded player
