= 1962 All England Badminton Championships =

1962 All England Championships
Tournament details
- Dates: 21 March 1962– 24 March 1962
- Edition: 52nd
- Venue: Wembley
- Location: London

The 1962 All England Championships was a badminton tournament held at Wembley, London, England, from 21–24 March 1962.

== Final results ==
Category	Winners	Runners-up	Score
Men's singles	(Denmark) Erland Kops	(Thailand) Charoen Wattanasin	15-10, 15-5
Women's singles	(United States) Judy Hashman	(England) Ursula Smith	11-4, 11-0
Men's doubles	(Denmark) Finn Kobberø & Jørgen Hammergaard Hansen	(Thailand) Narong Bhonchima & Raphi Kanchanaraphi	17-16, 15-3
Women's doubles	(United States) Judy Hashman-Devlin & (Denmark) Tonny Holst-Christensen	(Denmark) Karin Jørgensen & Ulla Rasmussen	15-5 15-3
Mixed doubles	(Denmark) Finn Kobberø & Ulla Rasmussen	(Denmark) Poul-Erik Nielsen & Inge Birgit Hansen	15-1, 15-11

== Men's singles ==
=== Section 1 ===
Round of 32
1	(Denmark) Erland Kops	15	15
(Indonesia) Nana Sutrisna	11	5
(England) L Ellwood	18	15
(Sweden) Olle Andersson	13	11
(Thailand) Narong Bhornchima	15	9	15
(England) Hugh Findlay	8	15	10
(Sweden) Bertil Glans	15	15
(England) David Rowe	7	6
(Indonesia) Ferry Sonneville	15	15
(Malaysia) Oong Chong Jin	8	11
(Sweden) Berndt Dahlberg	15	17
(England) Tony Jordan	4	14
(Thailand) Channarong Ratanaseangsuang	15	15
(England) Peter Waddell	5	5
(England) John Havers	10	15	15
(Denmark) Bjorn Holst-Christensen	15	11	4

Round of 16
1	(Denmark) Kops	15	15
(England) Ellwood	10	8
(Thailand) Bhornchima	15	15
(Sweden) Glans	12	3
(Indonesia) Sonneville	15	15
(Sweden) Dahlberg	8	7
(Thailand) Channarong	15	15
(England) Havers	5	1

Quarterfinals
1	(Denmark) Kops	15	15
(Thailand) Bhornchima	9	1
(Indonesia) Sonneville	15	2	15
(Thailand) Channarong	8	15	5

Semifinals
1	(Denmark) Kops	12	15	15
(Indonesia) Sonneville	15	5	10

=== Section 2 ===
Round of 32
(Thailand) Charoen Wattanasin	15	15
(England) Roger Mills	6	3
(Thailand) Thanoo Khadjadbhye	9	15	15
(Malaysia) Lee Kin Tat	15	4	5
(Indonesia) Mohamed Djundy	15	15
(Denmark) Jorgen Mortensen	10	4
(Scotland) Bob McCoig	15	15
(Malaysia) R T Ponnambalam	7	5
(Malaysia) Oon Chong Teik	15	15
(India) F M Vincent	4	6
(Indonesia) Tan Joe Hok	15	15
(Thailand) Raphi Kanchanaraphi	6	2
(Sweden) Goran Wahlqvist	15	15
(England) Tony Pears	10	3
(England) Trevor Coates	18	8	15
(Denmark) Finn Kobberø	13	15	12

Round of 16
(Thailand) Wattanasin	w/o
(Thailand) Khadjadbhye
(Indonesia) Djundy	15	11	15
(Scotland) McCoig	12	15	10
(Malaysia) Teik	15	15	15
(Indonesia) Hok	18	12	8
(Sweden) Wahlqvist	6	15	18
(England) Coates	15	8	16

Quarterfinals
(Thailand) Wattanasin	15	15
(Indonesia) Djundy	6	11
(Malaysia) Teik	12	15	15
(Sweden) Wahlqvist	15	5	4

Semifinals
(Thailand) Wattanasin	15	15
(Malaysia) Teik	10	8

== Women's singles ==
=== Section 1 ===
Round of 32
(United States) Judy Hashman	11	11
(England) A C Miller	4	1
(New Zealand) Glenys Middleberg	11	11
(Sweden) Eva Pettersson	1	5
(Denmark) Tonny Holst-Christensen	11	11
(England) Anita Price	1	0
(England) Jenny Pritchard	11	11
(Malaysia) Tan Gaik Bee	0	8
(England) Angela Bairstow	11	11
(England) B Holborn	1	8
(Republic of Ireland) Yvonne Kelly	8	12	11
(England) J R Calder	11	9	6
(Denmark) Karin Jørgensen	11	11
(England) Eileen Pattison	8	3
(England) M J Frost	11	11
(Sweden) Berit Olsson	5	5

Round of 16
(United States) Hashman	11	11
(New Zealand) Middleberg	2	1
(Denmark) Holst-C	12	11
(England) Pritchard	9	9
(England) Bairstow	11	11
(Republic of Ireland) Kelly	2	7
(Denmark) Jørgensen	11	11
(England) Frost	6	6

Quarterfinals
(United States) Hashman	11	11
(Denmark) Holst-C	4	1
(England) Bairstow	12	6	11
(Denmark) Jørgensen	9	11	4

Semifinals
(United States) Hashman	11	11
(England) Bairstow	9	6

=== Section 2 ===
Round of 32
(England) Ursula Smith	11	11
(England) M E Govett	2	4
(England) Heather Ward	11	12
(Scotland) Muriel Ferguson	3	11
(Denmark) Ulla Rasmussen	11	11
(England) P Cunnington	4	2
(England) Phyllis Kirkwood	1	11	12
(England) B P Robarts	11	4	11
(Republic of Ireland) Mary O'Sullivan	11	11
(Sweden) Gunilla Dahlstrom	6	1
(England) A H Larman	11	12
(Denmark) A Hessel	4	9
(England) Iris Rogers	11	11
(Denmark) Kirsten Dahl	7	1
(Scotland) Wilma Tyre	11	11
(England) Julie Charles	4	7

Round of 16
(England) Smith	5	11	1
(England) Ward	11	3	7ret
(Denmark) Rasmussen	11	11
(England) Kirkwood	5	6
(Republic of Ireland) O'Sullivan	11	11
(England) Larman	2	7
(England) Rogers	11	7	11
(Scotland) Tyre	5	11	6

Quarterfinals
(England) Smith	11	11
(Denmark) Rasmussen	8	6
(Republic of Ireland) O'Sullivan	11	11
(England) Rogers	3	5

Semifinals
(England) Smith	11	11
(Republic of Ireland) O'Sullivan	8	1
