= Badminton at the 1962 Asian Games – Men's team =

Men's team at the 1962 Asian Games
- Venue: Istora Senayan, Jakarta, Indonesia
- Dates: 25 – 27 August 1962

Medalists
gold medal	Indonesia; Tan Joe Hok, Ferry Sonneville, Liem Tjeng Kiang, Tutang Djamaluddin, Abdul Patah Unang
silver medal	Thailand; Charoen Wattanasin, Channarong Ratanaseangsuang, Sangob Rattanusorn, Narong Bhornchima, Raphi Kanchanaraphi
bronze medal	Malaya; Teh Kew San, Billy Ng, Yew Cheng Hoe, Ng Boon Bee, Tan Yee Khan

The badminton men's team tournament at the 1962 Asian Games took place from 25 to 27 August at the Istora Senayan Indoor Stadium in Jakarta, Indonesia. Originally, there were eight teams competing in the event, the teams being Indonesia, Japan, Singapore, Republic of China (Taiwan), Thailand, the Philippines, Malaya and Cambodia.

In the draw, Singapore was originally set to face Taiwan in the first round but due to political factors, the ROC delegation was barred from participating in the 1962 Asian Games by host Indonesian government. Therefore, Singapore automatically qualified for the semi-finals.

== Schedule ==
All times are Western Indonesia Time (UTC+07:00)

Date	Time	Event
Friday, 24 August 1962	09:30	Quarter-finals
Saturday, 25 August 1962	09:30; 14:30	Semi-finals; Bronze medal match
Sunday, 26 August 1962	14:30	Gold medal match

== Bracket ==
Quarter-finals
Indonesia	4
Japan	1
Philippines	2
Thailand	3
Cambodia	0
Malaya	5

Semi-finals
Indonesia	3
Singapore	0
Thailand	3
Malaya	0

Gold medal match
Indonesia	5
Thailand	0
Bronze medal match
Singapore	0
Malaya	3

== Quarter-finals ==
=== Indonesia vs Japan ===
Indonesia
4
Istora Senayan
24 August 1962, 09:30

Japan
1

			1	2	3
1	(Indonesia) (Japan)	Tan Joe Hok; Eiichi Nagai	15; 2	15; 5
2	(Indonesia) (Japan)	Ferry Sonneville; Yoshio Komiya	15; 6	17; 14
3	(Indonesia) (Japan)	Tutang Djamaluddin / Abdul Patah Unang; Yoshio Komiya / Eiichi Nagai	10; 15	15; 5	15; 11
4	(Indonesia) (Japan)	Ferry Sonneville; Eiichi Nagai	15; 8	15; 3
5	(Indonesia) (Japan)	Tan Joe Hok; Yoshio Komiya				w/o

=== Thailand vs Philippines ===
Thailand
3
Istora Senayan
24 August 1962, 09:30

Philippines
2

			1	2	3
1	(Thailand) (Philippines)	Charoen Wattanasin; Armando Yanga	15; 7	15; 3
2	(Thailand) (Philippines)	Channarong Ratanaseangsuang; Conrado Co	15; 1	15; 4
3	(Thailand) (Philippines)	Narong Bhornchima / Raphi Kanchanaraphi; Armando Yanga / Oscar Yanga	15; 0	15; 0
4	(Thailand) (Philippines)	Charoen Wattanasin; Conrado Co				w/o
5	(Thailand) (Philippines)	Channarong Ratanaseangsuang; Armando Yanga				w/o

=== Malaya vs Cambodia ===
Malaya
5
Istora Senayan
24 August 1962, 09:30

Cambodia
0

			1	2	3
1	(Malaysia) (Cambodia)	Teh Kew San; Smas Slayman	15; 3	15; 3
2	(Malaysia) (Cambodia)	Billy Ng; Bé Sabin	15; 3	15; 4
3	(Malaysia) (Cambodia)	Ng Boon Bee / Tan Yee Khan; Ly Phsou / Oun Phen	15; 2	15; 2
4	(Malaysia) (Cambodia)	Billy Ng; Smas Slayman				w/o
5	(Malaysia) (Cambodia)	Teh Kew San; Bé Sabin				w/o

== Semi-finals ==
=== Indonesia vs Japan ===
Indonesia
3
Istora Senayan
25 August 1962, 09:30

Singapore
0

			1	2	3
1	(Indonesia) (Singapore)	Tan Joe Hok; Wee Choon Seng	15; 3	15; 11
2	(Indonesia) (Singapore)	Ferry Sonneville; Gan Kok Peng	15; 5	15; 4
3	(Indonesia) (Singapore)	Tutang Djamaluddin / Abdul Patah Unang; Lim Wei Lon / Ong Poh Lim	11; 15	18; 14	15; 11
4	(Indonesia) (Singapore)	Ferry Sonneville; Wee Choon Seng				not played
5	(Indonesia) (Singapore)	Tan Joe Hok; Gan Kok Peng				not played

=== Malaya vs Thailand ===
Malaya
0
Istora Senayan
25 August 1962, 09:30

Thailand
3

			1	2	3
1	(Malaysia) (Thailand)	Teh Kew San; Charoen Wattanasin	12; 15	10; 15
2	(Malaysia) (Thailand)	Billy Ng; Channarong Ratanaseangsuang	15; 12	5; 15	3; 15
3	(Malaysia) (Thailand)	Ng Boon Bee / Tan Yee Khan; Narong Bhornchima / Raphi Kanchanaraphi	15; 8	10; 15	11; 15
4	(Malaysia) (Thailand)	Billy Ng; Charoen Wattanasin				not played
5	(Malaysia) (Thailand)	Teh Kew San; Channarong Ratanaseangsuang				not played

== Bronze medal match ==
=== Malaya vs Singapore ===
Malaya
3
Istora Senayan
25 August 1962, 14:30

Singapore
0

			1	2	3
1	(Malaysia) (Singapore)	Teh Kew San; Wee Choon Seng	18; 14	13; 15	15; 2
2	(Malaysia) (Singapore)	Yew Cheng Hoe; Gan Kok Peng	15; 2	15; 10
3	(Malaysia) (Singapore)	Ng Boon Bee / Tan Yee Khan; Lim Wei Lon / Ong Poh Lim	15; 12	15; 7
4	(Malaysia) (Singapore)	Yew Cheng Hoe; Wee Choon Seng				not played
5	(Malaysia) (Singapore)	Teh Kew San; Gan Kok Peng				not played

== Gold medal match ==
=== Indonesia vs Thailand ===
The final of the men's team event took place on 27 August 1962 with hosts Indonesia going head to head against Thailand. About 9,000 spectators came to witness the final in the Istora Senayan Indoor Stadium. In the first men's singles match, Tan Joe Hok played against a determined Charoen Wattanasin and took the first set 15–9. In the second set, Charoen fought back and won 15–10. In the decider, the Thai player, who was 14–10 up, was dissatisfied with the decision making of the umpire and linesman protested for an umpire change. When the score was 14–12, Charoen decided to retire from the match. The Thai team then made a controversial decision to withdraw from the next few matches, giving Indonesia the title.

Indonesia
5
Istora Senayan
26 August 1962, 14:30

Thailand
0

			1	2	3
1	(Indonesia) (Thailand)	Tan Joe Hok; Charoen Wattanasin	15; 9	10; 15	12; 14	w/o
2	(Indonesia) (Thailand)	Ferry Sonneville; Channarong Ratanaseangsuang				w/o
3	(Indonesia) (Thailand)	Tutang Djamaluddin / Abdul Patah Unang; Narong Bhornchima / Raphi Kanchanaraphi				w/o
4	(Indonesia) (Thailand)	Ferry Sonneville; Charoen Wattanasin				w/o
5	(Indonesia) (Thailand)	Tan Joe Hok; Channarong Ratanaseangsuang				w/o
