= 1954 All England Badminton Championships =

1954 All England Championships
Tournament details
- Dates: 17 March 1954– 21 March 1954
- Edition: 44th
- Venue: Empress Hall, Earls Court
- Location: London

The 1954 All England Championships was a badminton tournament held at the Empress Hall, Earls Court, London, England, from 17–21 March 1954.

== Final results ==
Category	Winners	Runners-up	Score
Men's singles	(Malaysia) Eddy Choong	(Canada) Donald Smythe	15–6, 15–5
Women's singles	(United States) Judy Devlin	(England) Iris Cooley	11–7, 11–5
Men's doubles	(Malaysia) Ooi Teik Hock & Ong Poh Lim	(Malaysia) Eddy Choong & David Ewe Choong	18–16, 15–12
Women's doubles	(United States) Judy Devlin & Sue Devlin	(England) Iris Cooley & June White	15–7, 12–15, 15-8
Mixed doubles	(England) John Best & Iris Cooley	(Denmark) Finn Kobberø & Inge Birgit Hansen	15–12, 15-0

Judy Devlin and Sue Devlin represented the United States, they were the daughters of former champion Frank Devlin of Ireland.

== Men's singles ==
=== Section 1 ===
Round of 32
1	(Malaysia) Eddy Choong	15	15
(England) Noel Radford	3	1
(England) F John Shaw	15	15
(Malaysia) Eng Chin Khoo	10	12
(Denmark) Palle Granlund	15	15
(India) Vikram Bhat	4	7
(New Zealand) Jeff Robson	15	15
(Sweden) Berndt Dahlberg	5	0
(Denmark) Poul Holm	15	6	15
(India) Trilok Nath Seth +	11	15	0
(England) Tony Jordan	15	15
(England) Tom Wingfield	13	8
(Malaysia) Ong Poh Lim +	15	15
(Sweden) Knut Malmgren	2	8
(England) Ron Lockwood	18	15
(England) E E Symonds	17	11

Round of 16
1	(Malaysia) Choong	15	15
(England) Shaw	7	5
(Denmark) Granlund	2	15	15
(New Zealand) Robson	15	10	12
(Denmark) Holm	15	15
(England) Jordan	11	10
(Malaysia) Poh Lim	15	15
(England) Lockwood	3	3

Quarterfinals
1	(Malaysia) Choong	15	8	15
(Denmark) Granlund	9	15	12
(Denmark) Holm	15	7	15
(Malaysia) Po Lim	7	15	12

Semifinals
1	(Malaysia) Choong	15	15
(Denmark) Holm	5	10

=== Section 2 ===
Round of 32
(Canada) Donald Smythe +	15	15
(England) R Quiddington	3	1
(England) John Best	15	12	15
(England) John Timperley	1	15	9
(Malaysia) Johnny Heah	15	15
(England) M W Holborn	3	4
(Denmark) Finn Kobberø +	15	15
(Malaysia) L T Lee	12	11
(Denmark) Jørgen Hammergaard Hansen	16	15	15
(Sweden) Leif Ekedahl	18	9	9
2	(Malaysia) Ooi Teik Hock	15	15
(Scotland) Alistair McIntyre	6	6
(India) Nandu Natekar +	15	15
(England) J A Broadhurst	4	3
(Republic of Ireland) Frank Peard	15	15
(England) Dick Hashman	4	7

Round of 16
(Canada) Smythe	15	15
(England) Best	6	2
(Malaysia) Heah	17	15
(Denmark) Kobbero	14	5
(Denmark) Hammegaard-H	14	15	15
2	(Malaysia) Teik Hock	18	10	13
(India) Natekar	15	12	15
(Republic of Ireland) Peard	7	15	12

Quarterfinals
(Canada) Smythe	15	15
(Malaysia) Heah	9	11
(Denmark) Hammegaard-H	15	15
(India) Natekar	5	6

Semifinals
(Canada) Smythe	15	15
(Denmark) Hamegaard-H	3	5

+ Denotes seeded player

== Women's singles ==
=== Section 1 ===
Round of 32
(United States) Judy Devlin +	11	11
(England) J M Baldwin	1	0
(England) Elizabeth O'Beirne	11	11
(Denmark) Inge Birgit Hansen	6	0
(Denmark) Inger Kjaergaard	11	8	11
(England) Audrey Stone	2	11	4
(South Africa) M D Flynn	11	11
(Scotland) I S Vallance	7	6
(Denmark) Aase Schiøtt Jacobsen +	11	11
(England) Ruth Page	4	2
(England) B Horner	bye
(England) Jenifer Peters	bye
(England) S Spreadborough	bye

Round of 16
(United States) Devlin	11	11
(England) O'Beirne	7	0
(Denmark) Kjaergaard	11	11
(South Africa) Flynn	3	1
(Denmark) Schiott-Jacobsen	11	11
(England) Horner	2	0
(England) Peters	7	11	11
(England) Spreadborough	11	5	6

Quarterfinals
(United States) Devlin	11	11
(Denmark) Kjaergaard	3	5
(Denmark) Schiott-Jacobsen	11	11
(England) Peters	2	2

Semifinals
(United States) Devlin	11	11
(Denmark) Schiott-Jacobsen	5	3

=== Section 2 ===
Round of 32
(England) Iris Cooley	bye
(England) Urusla Smith	bye
(Denmark) Birgit Schultz-Pedersen
bye
(Scotland) Nancy Horner	bye
(New Zealand) Heather Robson +	12	11
(England) June White	10	6
(Denmark) Karin Jorgensen	bye
(Denmark) Agnete Friis	11	11
(United States) Sue Devlin	7	3
(England) Sylvia Ripley	11	7	11
(Sweden) Ulla Britt Schelin	9	11	9

Round of 16
(England) Cooley	11	11
(England) Smith	0	0
(Denmark) Schultz-Pedersen	11	11
(Scotland) Horner	3	1
(New Zealand) Robson	11	11
(Denmark) Jorgensen	2	0
(Denmark) Friis	11	11
(England) Ripley	8	3

Quarterfinals
(England) Cooley	11	11
(Denmark) Schultz-Pedersen	0	6
(New Zealand) Robson	11	11
(Denmark) Friis	7	5

Semifinals
(England) Cooley	11	11
(New Zealand) Robson	7	5
