= Badminton at the 1965 SEAP Games – Individual event =

Event at 1965 SEAP Games

Tournament details
- Dates: 16–18 December 1965
- Venue: Selangor Badminton Association Hall
- Location: Kuala Lumpur, Malaysia

Champions
- Men's singles: (Malaysia) Tan Aik Huang
- Women's singles: (Malaysia) Rosalind Singha Ang
- Men's doubles: (Malaysia) Ng Boon Bee (Malaysia) Tan Yee Khan
- Women's doubles: (Thailand) Pratuang Pattabongse (Thailand) Pachara Pattabongse
- Mixed doubles: (Malaysia) Ng Boon Bee (Malaysia) Teoh Siew Yong

The individual events for badminton at the 1965 SEAP Games will be held from 14 to 21 December 1965 at the Selangor Badminton Association Hall, Kuala Lumpur, Malaysia. Five events were contested: the men's singles, women's singles, men's doubles, women's doubles and mixed doubles.

== Men's singles ==
=== Seeds ===
1. (Thailand) Sangob Rattanusorn (silver medalist)
2. (Malaysia) Tan Aik Huang (gold medalist)

=== Draw ===
First round
Wee Sen (SIN)	15	15
Bounminh (LAO)	7	4
Nguyễn Văn Ngọc (VNM)	3	1
Wong Tew Ghee (SIN)	15	15

Quarter-finals
1	Sangob Rattanusorn (THA)	15	15
Champadeng Outhabong (LAO)	2	2
Wee Sen (SIN)	8	7
Yew Cheng Hoe (MAS)	15	15
Soonchai Akyapisut (THA)	11	15	15
Wong Tew Ghee (SIN)	15	12	8
Thái Luân Hiển (VNM)	1	2
2	Tan Aik Huang (MAS)	15	15

Semi-finals
1	Sangob Rattanusorn (THA)	15	15
Yew Cheng Hoe (MAS)	10	6
Soonchai Akyapisut (THA)	1	6
2	Tan Aik Huang (MAS)	15	15

Gold medal match
1	Sangob Rattanusorn (THA)	5	15	7
2	Tan Aik Huang (MAS)	15	7	15
Bronze medal match
Yew Cheng Hoe (MAS)
Soonchai Akyapisut (THA)	w	/	o

== Women's singles ==
=== Seeds ===
1. (Thailand) Sumol Chanklum (silver medalist)
2. (Malaysia) Rosalind Singha Ang (gold medalist)

=== Draw ===
First round
Myint Myint Khin (BIR)	11	11
Nguyễn Thị Thúy Hồng (VNM)	2	2

Quarter-finals
1	Sumol Chanklum (THA)	11	11
Lim Choo Eng (SIN)	8	7
Teoh Siew Yong (MAS)	11	11
Khin Than Nwe (BIR)	3	2
Myint Myint Khin (BIR)	w	/	o
Pratuang Pattabongse (THA)
Amy Yap (SIN)	1	1
2	Rosalind Singha Ang (MAS)	11	11

Semi-finals
1	Sumol Chanklum (THA)	11	11
Teoh Siew Yong (MAS)	6	4
Myint Myint Khin (BIR)	10	1
2	Rosalind Singha Ang (MAS)	12	11

Gold medal match
1	Sumol Chanklum (THA)	4	1
2	Rosalind Singha Ang (MAS)	11	11
Bronze medal match
Teoh Siew Yong (MAS)	11	11
Myint Myint Khin (BIR)	4	0

== Men's doubles ==
=== Seeds ===
1. (Malaysia) Ng Boon Bee / (Malaysia) Tan Yee Khan (gold medalist)
2. (Thailand) Raphi Kanchanaraphi / (Thailand) Narong Bhornchima (silver medalist)

=== Draw ===
First round
Bounminh (LAO); Souvanthong (LAO)	15	10	15
Âu Tâm Đế (VNM); Nguyễn Khương Phước (VNM)	5	15	8
Nguyễn Văn Ngọc (VNM); Thái Luân Hiển (VNM)	0	4
Ismail Ibrahim (SIN); Omar Ibrahim (SIN)	15	15

Quarter-finals
1	Ng Boon Bee (MAS); Tan Yee Khan (MAS)	15	15
Champadeng Outhabong (LAO); Bounpheng Siaksone (LAO)	9	10
Bounminh (LAO); Souvanthong (LAO)	?	?
Sangob Rattanusorn (THA); Soonchai Akyapisut (THA)	?	?
Tan Aik Huang (MAS); Yew Cheng Hoe (MAS)	15	15
Ismail Ibrahim (SIN); Omar Ibrahim (SIN)	10	7
Wee Sen (SIN); Wong Tew Ghee (SIN)	?	?
2	Narong Bhornchima (THA); Raphi Kanchanaraphi (THA)	?	?

Semi-finals
1	Ng Boon Bee (MAS); Tan Yee Khan (MAS)	w	/	o
Sangob Rattanusorn (THA); Soonchai Akyapisut (THA)
Tan Aik Huang (MAS); Yew Cheng Hoe (MAS)	12	12
2	Narong Bhornchima (THA); Raphi Kanchanaraphi (THA)	15	15

Gold medal match
1	Ng Boon Bee (MAS); Tan Yee Khan (MAS)	15	15
2	Narong Bhornchima (THA); Raphi Kanchanaraphi (THA)	8	11
Bronze medal match
Sangob Rattanusorn (THA); Soonchai Akyapisut (THA)
Tan Aik Huang (MAS); Yew Cheng Hoe (MAS)	w	/	o

== Women's doubles ==
=== Seeds ===
1. (Thailand) Pratuang Pattabongse / (Thailand) Pachara Pattabongse (gold medalist)
2. (Malaysia) Rosalind Singha Ang / (Malaysia) Teoh Siew Yong (silver medalist)
3. (Thailand) Sumol Chanklum / Bhoopha Koentong (quarter-finals)
4. (Singapore) Lim Choo Eng / (Singapore) Amy Yap Hwee Bin (quarter-finals)

=== Draw ===
Quarter-finals
4	Lim Choo Eng (SIN); Amy Yap (SIN)	6	9
5	Myint Myint Khin (BIR); Khim Than Nwe (BIR)	15	15
3	Ho Cheng Yoke (MAS); Sylvia Tan (MAS)	15	15
6	Sumol Chanklum (THA); Bhoopha Koentong (THA)	7	5
2	Woo Ti Soo (SIN); Aishah Attan (SIN)	2	1
7	Rosalind Singha Ang (MAS); Teoh Siew Yong (MAS)	15	15

Semi-finals
1	Pratuang Pattabongse (THA); Pachara Pattabongse (THA)	15	15
Myint Myint Khin (BIR); Khim Than Nwe (BIR)	11	8
Ho Cheng Yoke (MAS); Sylvia Tan (MAS)	6	11
2	Rosalind Singha Ang (MAS); Teoh Siew Yong (MAS)	15	15

Gold medal match
1	Pratuang Pattabongse (THA); Pachara Pattabongse (THA)	15	15
2	Rosalind Singha Ang (MAS); Teoh Siew Yong (MAS)	10	8
Bronze medal match
Myint Myint Khin (BIR); Khim Than Nwe (BIR)	12	2
Ho Cheng Yoke (MAS); Sylvia Tan (MAS)	15	15

== Mixed doubles ==
=== Seeds ===
1. (Thailand) Raphi Kanchanaraphi / Sumol Chanklum (bronze medalists)
2. (Malaysia) Tan Yee Khan / (Malaysia) Rosalind Singha Ang (silver medalist)
3. (Thailand) Sangob Rattanusorn / Pachara Pattabongse (quarter-finals)

=== Draw ===
First round

Quarter-finals
3	Sangob Rattanusorn (THA); Pachara Pattabongse (THA)	10	15	11
Ng Boon Bee (MAS); Teoh Siew Yong (MAS)	15	7	15

Semi-finals
1	Raphi Kanchanaraphi (THA); Sumol Chanklum (THA)	10	14
Ng Boon Bee (MAS); Teoh Siew Yong (MAS)	15	18
Lâm Trình (VNM); Nguyễn Thị Thúy Hồng (VNM)	5	5
2	Tan Yee Khan (MAS); Rosalind Singha Ang (MAS)	15	15

Gold medal match
(Malaysia) Ng Boon Bee (Malaysia) Teoh Siew Yong	15	15
2	(Malaysia) Tan Yee Khan (Malaysia) Rosalind Singha Ang	11	5
Bronze medal match
Raphi Kanchanaraphi (THA); Sumol Chanklum (THA)	15	15
Lâm Trình (VNM); Nguyễn Thị Thúy Hồng (VNM)	8	6

== See also ==
- Men's team tournament
- Women's team tournament
