= 1958 Singapore Open =

Tournament details
- Dates: 1 August 1958– 4 August 1958
- Edition: 25th
- Venue: Singapore Badminton Hall
- Location: Geylang, Singapore

Champions
- Men's singles: (Colony of Singapore) Omar Ibrahim
- Women's singles: (Colony of Singapore) Nancy Lim
- Men's doubles: (Federation of Malaya) Johnny Heah (Federation of Malaya) Lim Say Hup
- Women's doubles: (Colony of Singapore) Lau Hui Huang (Colony of Singapore) Nancy Lim
- Mixed doubles: (Federation of Malaya) Lim Say Hup (Colony of Singapore) Jessie Ong

The 1958 Singapore Open, also known as the 1958 Singapore Open Badminton Championships, took place from 1 – 4 August 1958 at the Singapore Badminton Hall in Singapore.

== Final results ==
Category	Winners	Runners-up	Score
Men's singles	(Colony of Singapore) Omar Ibrahim	(Colony of Singapore) V. S. S. Nathan	18–14, 15–11
Women's singles	(Colony of Singapore) Nancy Lim	(Colony of Singapore) Long Soo Chin	11–3, 12–11
Men's doubles	(Federation of Malaya) Johnny Heah & Lim Say Hup	(Federation of Malaya) Lim Say Wan & (Colony of Singapore) Ong Poh Lim	15–9, 15–7
Women's doubles	(Colony of Singapore) Lau Hui Huang & Nancy Lim	(Federation of Malaya) Amy Heah & Phoebe Heah	15–10, 8–15, 15–10
Mixed doubles	(Federation of Malaya) Lim Say Hup & (Colony of Singapore) Jessie Ong	(Federation of Malaya) Johnny Heah & Amy Heah	8–15, 15–10, 17–15
