= Badminton at the 1959 SEAP Games =

SEA Games event

Badminton at the 1959 Southeast Asian Peninsular Games
- Venue: National Stadium
- Location: Bangkok, Thailand
- Dates: 12 – 17 December 1959
- Nations: 3

Badminton was one of the few main sports to be inaugurated at the 1959 SEAP Games. The events were held in Bangkok, Thailand from 12 to 17 December 1959. Due to the team events being cancelled, only two competitions were held, which were men singles and in men doubles. Only Thailand, Burma and Laos took part in the events.

The Singaporean and Malayan badminton contingent were originally scheduled to compete in badminton but later withdrew due to their national badminton association being unaffiliated to their respective Olympic council.

Thanoo Khadjadbhye defeated his teammate Charoen Wattanasin in the men's singles final 15–14, 15–13 and in men's doubles Kamal Sudthivanich teamed up with Charoen Wattanasin to beat Narong Bhornchima and Raphi Kanchanaraphi 15–12, 15–14 in another all-Thai final contest. Philip Gaudoin helped Burma to win two bronze medals in singles and doubles. Laos finished the events without winning a medal.

== Medal table ==
Rank	Nation	Gold	Silver	Bronze	Total
1	Thailand (THA)	2	2	0	4
2	Burma (BIR)	0	0	2	2
Totals (2 entries)		2	2	2	6

== Medalists ==
Event	Gold	Silver	Bronze
Men's singles	Thanoo Khadjadbhye; Thailand	Charoen Wattanasin; Thailand	Philip Gaudoin; Burma
Men's doubles	Charoen Wattanasin; Kamal Sudthivanich; Thailand	Narong Bhornchima; Raphi Kanchanaraphi; Thailand	Philip Gaudoin; Aung Myint; Burma

== Results ==
=== Men's singles ===
Quarter-finals
Charoen Wattanasin (THA)	15	15
Khin Maung Aye (BIR)	2	2
Bounpheng Siaksone (LAO)	5	7
Thanoo Khadjadbye (THA)	15	15

Semi-finals
Charoen Wattanasin (THA)
Philip Gaudoin (BIR)
Tiock (LAO)
Thanoo Khadjadbye (THA)

Gold medal match
Charoen Wattanasin (THA)	14	13
Thanoo Khadjadbye (THA)	15	15
Bronze medal match
Philip Gaudoin (BIR)
Tiock (LAO)

=== Men's doubles ===
Quarter-finals
Narong Bhornchima (THA); Raphi Kanchanaraphi (THA)	15	15
Boun Minh (LAO); Vongdeuane (LAO)	2	2
Bounpheng Siaksone (LAO); Tiock (LAO)	6	7
Charoen Wattanasin (THA); Kamal Sudthivanich (THA)	15	15

Semi-finals
Narong Bhornchima (THA); Raphi Kanchanaraphi (THA)
Philip Gaudoin (BIR); Aung Myint (BIR)
Myint Htoon (BIR); Maung Hla (BIR)
Charoen Wattanasin (THA); Kamal Sudthivanich (THA)

Gold medal match
Narong Bhornchima (THA); Raphi Kanchanaraphi (THA)	12	14
Charoen Wattanasin (THA); Kamal Sudthivanich (THA)	15	15
Bronze medal match
Philip Gaudoin (BIR); Aung Myint (BIR)
Myint Htoon (BIR); Maung Hla (BIR)
