= John Best (badminton) =

English badminton player

Personal information
- Born: 1929 (age 96–97)

Sport
- Country: England
- Sport: Badminton

Johnny R. Best is an English badminton player.

== Badminton career ==
Best won the mixed doubles during the 1954 All England Badminton Championships with Iris Cooley. Besides All England, he also won several high-profile tournaments such as Scottish, Irish and Dutch Open.

== Achievements ==
=== International tournaments (7 titles, 6 runners-up) ===
Men's doubles
Year	Tournament	Partner	Opponent	Score	Result
1955	Irish Open	(England) Warwick Shute	(England) John D. McColl (England) Tony Jordan	15–6, 15–10	(gold) Winner
1956	Scottish Open	(England) Warwick Shute	(England) John D. McColl (England) Tony Jordan	13–18, 15–10, 15–10	(gold) Winner
1957	Irish Open	(England) Tony Jordan	(Malaysia) Eddy Choong (Malaysia) Oon Chong Teik	7–15, 8–15	(silver) Runner-up
1960	Dutch Open	(England) Peter Waddell	(Denmark) Jørgen Hageman (Denmark) Arne Rasmussen	15–11, 15–1	(gold) Winner
1961	Scottish Open	(Thailand) Charoen Wattanasin	(Scotland) Robert McCoig (Scotland) W. Frank Shannon	5–15, 7–15	(silver) Runner-up

Mixed doubles
Year	Tournament	Partner	Opponent	Score	Result
1954	Scottish Open	(England) Iris Cooley	(England) Tony Jordan (England) June White	18–14, 2–15, 9–15	(silver) Runner-up
1954	All England Open	(England) Iris Cooley	(Denmark) Finn Kobberø (Denmark) Inge Birgit Hansen	15–12, 15–0	(gold) Winner
1955	Scottish Open	(England) Iris Cooley	(England) Tony Jordan (England) June White	15–7, 3–15, 15–10	(gold) Winner
1956	Scottish Open	(England) Iris Rogers	(England) Tony Jordan (England) June Timperley	15–12, 10–15, 8–15	(silver) Runner-up
1957	Irish Open	(England) Iris Rogers	(England) Tony Jordan (England) June Timperley	15–11, 17–18, 6–15	(silver) Runner-up
1957	Scottish Open	(England) Iris Rogers	(England) Tony Jordan (England) June Timperley	15–9, 15–8	(gold) Winner
1957	Swedish Open	(England) Iris Rogers	(England) Tony Jordan (England) June Timperley	14–17, 3–15	(silver) Runner-up
1960	Dutch Open	(England) Audrey Marshall	(England) Hugh Findlay (England) P. Warner	15–6, 15–4	(gold) Winner
