= Heah Hock Aun =

Malaysian badminton player (1932–2014)

Heah Hock Aun 连福安
Personal information
- Full name: Johnny Heah Hock Aun
- Born: 15 January 1932 Penang, British Malaya
- Died: 7 May 2014 (aged 82)

Sport
- Country: Malaysia
- Sport: Badminton
- Event: Men's singles & Men's doubles
Medal record
Men's badminton
Representing Malaya
Thomas Cup
Silver medal – second place	1958 Singapore	Men's team

Heah Hock Aun, (Chinese: 連福安; 15 January 1932 – 7 May 2014) was a former Malayan (Malaysian) badminton player, known for his accuracy and touch, who excelled internationally during the 1950s.

== Early life ==
Heah was born on 15 January 1932, in Penang, British Malaya. He was the son of Heah Joo Seang, a well-known rubber magnate, philanthropist and politician in Malaya.

== Career ==
Known as Johnny Heah while playing in Europe, he won men's singles at the Scottish Open in 1952, and was runner-up in men's singles to the celebrated Eddy Choong at the prestigious All-England Championships in 1953. His most notable badminton achievement was winning men's doubles at the 1957 All-England's with American Joe Alston, beating Eddy Choong and his brother David. Heah represented Malaya in the 1958 Thomas Cup (world team championship) Challenge Round, splitting his two doubles matches in Malaya's loss of the cup to Indonesia.

== Personal life ==
Heah married Amy Choong, cousin of the famous Malayan badminton players, David E. L. Choong and Eddy Choong, in 1955.

== Achievements ==
=== International tournaments ===
Men's singles
Year	Tournament	Opponent	Score	Result
1952	Scottish Open	(Malaysia) Eddy Choong	15–11, 15–8	(gold) Winner
1952	Irish Open	(Malaysia) Eddy Choong	7–15, 11–15	(silver) Runner-up
1953	All England Open	(Malaysia) Eddy Choong	4–15, 4–15	(silver) Runner-up

Men's doubles
Year	Tournament	Partner	Opponent	Score	Result
1952	Irish Open	(Republic of Ireland) Jim FitzGibbon	(Malaysia) David Choong (Malaysia) Eddy Choong	11–15, 5–15	(silver) Runner-up
1957	Singapore Open	(Malaysia) Lim Say Hup	(Colony of Singapore) Ismail Marjan (Colony of Singapore) Ong Poh Lim	10–15, 15–4, 15–7	(gold) Winner
1957	All England Open	(United States) Joe Alston	(Malaysia) David Choong (Malaysia) Eddy Choong	15–10, 16–17, 15–5	(gold) Winner
1958	Malaysia Open	(Malaysia) Lim Say Hup	(Thailand) Charoen Wattanasin (Thailand) Kamal Sudthivanich	11–15, 11–15	(silver) Runner-up
1958	Singapore Open	(Malaysia) Lim Say Hup	(Malaysia) Lim Say Wan (Colony of Singapore) Ong Poh Lim	15–9, 15–7	(gold) Winner

Mixed doubles
Year	Tournament	Partner	Opponent	Score	Result
1952	Scottish Open	(England) Joy Saunders	(England) Tony Jordan (England) Elisabeth O'Beirne	15–10, 12–15, 15–10	(gold) Winner
1958	Malaysia Open	(Malaysia) Amy Heah	(Malaysia) Lim Say Hup (Malaysia) Tan Gaik Bee	15–12, 4–15, 14–18	(silver) Runner-up
1958	Singapore Open	(Malaysia) Amy Heah	(Malaysia) Lim Say Hup (Colony of Singapore) Jessie Ong	15–8, 10–15, 15–17	(silver) Runner-up
