= Njoo Kiem Bie =

Indonesian badminton player (1927–2008)

Personal information
- Born: Njoo Kiem Bie; 17 September 1927 Surabaya, Indonesia
- Died: 7 January 2008 (aged 80) Surabaya, Indonesia
- Height: 1.80 m (5 ft 11 in)

Sport
- Country: Indonesia
- Sport: Badminton
Medal record
Men's badminton
Representing Indonesia
Thomas Cup
| Gold medal – first place | 1958 Singapore | Men's team |
| Gold medal – first place | 1961 Jakarta | Men's team |

Njoo Kiem Bie (naturalized name Koesbianto) (Chinese: 楊金美; pinyin: Yáng Jīnměi; Pe̍h-ōe-jī: Iûⁿ Kim-bí; 17 September 1927 – 7 January 2008) was a male badminton player from Indonesia in the 1950s. His biggest achievement was helping to bring the Thomas Cup (world men's team title) to Indonesia for the first time, as a doubles player in the 1958 series in Singapore, and helping to defend that title in 1961 in Jakarta.

== Private life ==
His wife's name was Sisca Ling. He had two children, Lucy and Maria.

== Clubs ==
- POR Tionghoa, PB Happy, PB Rajawali, PB Suryanaga

== Achievements ==
=== As a player ===
- Winning men's singles, men's doubles, mixed doubles All Surabaya and East Java Badminton Championship between 1942 and 1956
- Member of world champion Thomas Cup team 1958 at Singapore
- Member of world champion Thomas Cup team 1961 at Jakarta
- Winning Indonesia National Championships in men's doubles (1960, 1964) and mixed doubles (1955)

=== As a staff member ===
- Expert Council PBSI East Java
- PB PBSI's Generally Opinion and Expert Council

== Honours ==
- Anugerah Satya Lencana Kebudayaan from President Sukarno
- Tanda kehormatan Menteri Pertahanan Keamanan L.B. Moerdani
- Satya Lencana Kelas 1 PB PBSI
- Tanda Kehormatan Gubernur Akabri Laut Soeprapto
- Tanda Kehormatan Presiden IBF Ron Palmer
- Tanda kehormatan East Java Gouvernour Mohammad Noer and Ketua DPRD Jawa Timur M. Said
