= Charoen Wattanasin =

Thai badminton player

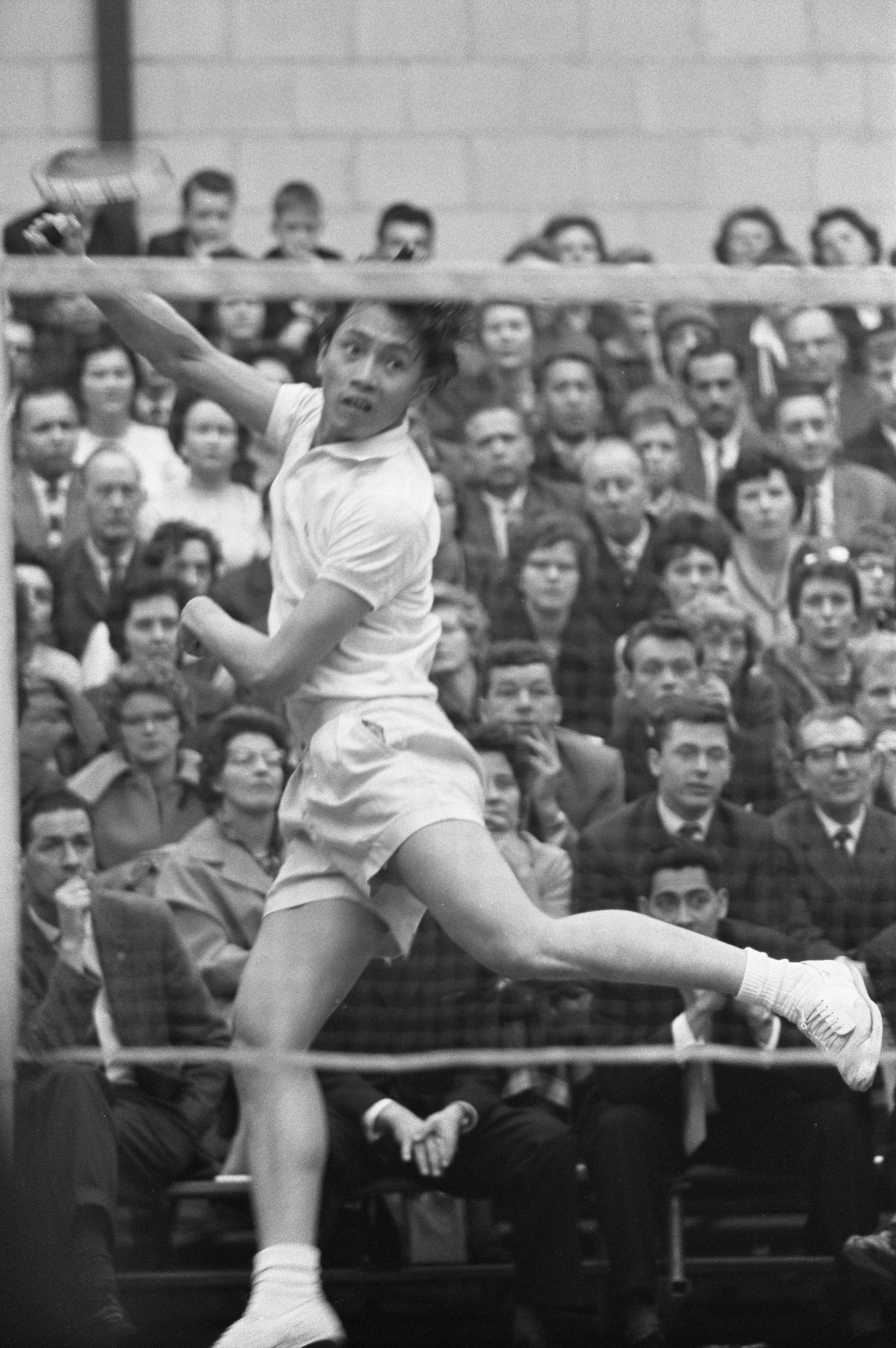
- Charoen Wattanasin in 1962

Personal information
- Born: 4 April 1937 (age 89) Chiang Mai, Siam

Sport
- Country: Thailand
- Sport: Badminton
Medal record
Men's badminton
Representing Thailand
Thomas Cup
Silver medal – second place	1961 Jakarta	Men's team
Asian Games
Gold medal – first place	1966 Bangkok	Men's team
Silver medal – second place	1962 Jakarta	Men's team
Bronze medal – third place	1966 Bangkok	Men's doubles
SEAP Games
Gold medal – first place	1959 Bangkok	Men's doubles
Silver medal – second place	1959 Bangkok	Men's singles

Charoen Wattanasin (Thai: เจริญ วรรธนะสิน) (born 1937) is a Thai badminton player who won international championships in the late 1950s and early 1960s.

== Career ==
Between 1958 and 1962 Wattanasin captured the open men's singles titles of Malaya, Ireland, Scotland, Norway, and France. He also shared the open men's doubles titles of Malaya, Scotland, the Netherlands, and the USA. Wattanasin was a men's singles runner-up to Denmark's formidable Erland Kops at the All-England Championships in 1960 and 1962. He represented Thailand in the Thomas Cup (men's international team) campaigns of 1957-1958 and 1963-1964.

== Corruption scandal ==
In 2000, Wattanasin was inducted into the World Badminton Hall of Fame. However, there were scandals and corruption issues when he was the president of the Badminton Association of Thailand between 2009 and 2013. In 2010, 16 players and coaches quit Badminton Association of Thailand as they did not receive supporting fee from the association, while Wattanasin claimed that he already provided support.

== Political perspective ==
In 2014, Wattanasin criticised the European Union's decision to impose political sanctions against Thailand for overthrowing an elected government by stating that Thai people should ban products from the EU, particularly cars, and stop travelling to the EU as well; however, his sons owned BMWs and his daughter was a communication general manager for Chanel Thailand.

== Personal life ==
He is a father of two famous singers Jirayut Wattanasin and Jetrin Wattanasin.

== Achievements ==
=== Asian Games ===
Men's Doubles
Year	Venue	Partner	Opponent	Score	Result
1966	Kittikachorn Stadium, Bangkok, Thailand	(Thailand) Tuly Ulao	(Indonesia) Ang Tjin Siang (Indonesia) Tjoa Tjong Boan	15–11, 7–15, 10–15	Bronze

=== SEAP Games ===
Men's singles
Year	Venue	Opponent	Score	Result
1959	National Stadium, Bangkok, Thailand	(Thailand) Thanoo Khadjadbhye	14–15, 13–15	Silver

Men's doubles
Year	Venue	Partner	Opponent	Score	Result
1959	National Stadium, Bangkok, Thailand	(Thailand) Kamal Sudthivanich	(Thailand) Narong Bhornchima (Thailand) Raphi Kanchanaraphi	15–12, 15–14	Gold

=== International tournaments ===
Men's singles
Year	Tournament	Opponent	Score	Result
1958	Malaysia Open	(Malaysia) Teh Kew San	15–9, 15–4	(gold) Winner
1959	Canadian Open	(Indonesia) Tan Joe Hock	4–15, 10–15	(silver) Runner-up
1959	U.S. Open	(Indonesia) Tan Joe Hock	15–7, 5–15, 14–18	(silver) Runner-up
1959	Malaysia Open	(Malaysia) Teh Kew San	15–11, 15–12	(gold) Winner
1959	Western Indian Championships	(Denmark) Erland Kops	13–15, 3–12 retired	(silver) Runner-up
1960	All England Open	(Denmark) Erland Kops	11–15, 15–11, 6–15	(silver) Runner-up
1960	Norwegian International	(Sweden) Bertil Glans	15–5, 15–3	(gold) Winner
1961	Dutch Open	(Indonesia) Ferry Sonneville	8–15, 5–15	(silver) Runner-up
1961	Scottish Open	(Scotland) Robert McCoig	4–15, 15–12, 15–9	(gold) Winner
1962	Scottish Open	(England) Trevor Coates	15–3, 15–4	(gold) Winner
1962	Lancashire Open	(England) Roger Mills	15–4, 15–4	(gold) Winner
1962	Dutch Open	(Indonesia) Ferry Sonneville	7–15, 3–15	(silver) Runner-up
1962	Irish Open	(Scotland) Robert McCoig	15–6, 15–8	(gold) Winner
1962	All England Open	(Denmark) Erland Kops	10–15, 5–15	(silver) Runner-up
1962	French Open	(Denmark) Finn Kobberø	15–4, 18–13	(gold) Winner
1962	Malaysia Open	(Thailand) Channarong Ratanaseangsuang	15–4, 7–15, 15–8	(gold) Winner

Men's doubles
Year	Tournament	Partner	Opponent	Score	Result
1958	Malaysia Open	(Thailand) Kamal Sudthivanich	(Malaysia) Johnny Heah (Malaysia) Lim Say Hup	15–11, 15–11	(gold) Winner
1959	Canadian Open	(Thailand) Thanoo Khadjadbhye	(Malaysia) Lim Say Hup (Malaysia) Teh Kew San	15–10, 13–15, 13–15	(silver) Runner-up
1959	Western Indian Championships	(Thailand) Kamal Sudthivanich	(Malaysia) Lim Say Hup (India) Nandu Natekar	6–15, 15–6, 13–18	(silver) Runner-up
1960	Canada Open	(Indonesia) Tan Joe Hock	(Malaysia) Lim Say Hup (Malaysia) Teh Kew San	8–15, 8–15	(silver) Runner-up
1960	U.S. Open	(Denmark) Finn Kobberø	(United States) Manuel Armendariz (United States) Jim Poole	15–6, 15–6	(gold) Winner
1961	Scottish Open	(England) Johnny Best	(Scotland) Robert McCoig (Scotland) Frank Shannon	5–15, 7–15	(silver) Runner-up
1962	Scottish Open	(Malaysia) Jimmy Lim	(Scotland) Robert McCoig (Scotland) Frank Shannon	10–15, 15–11, 15–10	(gold) Winner
1962	Lancashire Open	(England) R. Derrick	(England) Tony Jordan (England) Trevor Coates	8–15, 15–7, 5–15	(silver) Runner-up
1962	Dutch Open	(Malaysia) Oon Chong Teik	(Malaysia) Oon Chong Jin (Denmark) Ole Mertz	15–12, 15–13	(gold) Winner
1962	Irish Open	(Republic of Ireland) Lennox Robinson	(Scotland) Robert McCoig (Scotland) Frank Shannon	10–15, 11–15	(silver) Runner-up
1962	French Open	(Denmark) Torkild Nielsen	(Denmark) Finn Kobberø (Denmark) Bengt Nielsen	16–18, 15–1, 4–15	(silver) Runner-up
1969	Canadian Open	(Indonesia) Tan Joe Hock	(England) Tony Jordan (Scotland) Robert McCoig	7–15, 6–15	(silver) Runner-up

Mixed doubles
Year	Tournament	Partner	Opponent	Score	Result
1962	Dutch Open	(Netherlands) Els Robbé	(Malaysia) Oon Chong Teik (Denmark) Ulla Rasmussen	10–15, 5–15	(silver) Runner-up
1962	French Open	(England) Veronica Brock	(Denmark) Finn Kobberø (Malaysia) Tan Gaik Bee	3–15, 2–15	(silver) Runner-up

=== Invitational tournament ===
Men's singles
Year	Tournament	Opponent	Score	Result
1959	World Invitational Championships	(Malaysia) Teh Kew San	15–1, 15–7	Gold
