= Raphi Kanchanaraphi =

Thai-Canadian badminton player (1936–2010)

Personal information
- Born: 6 November 1936 Bangkok, Siam
- Died: 19 February 2010 (aged 73) Bangkok, Thailand

Sport
- Country: Thailand
- Sport: Badminton
Medal record
Men's badminton
Representing Canada
Thomas Cup
Bronze medal – third place	1973 Jakarta	Men's team
Representing Thailand
Thomas Cup
Silver medal – second place	1961 Jakarta	Men's team
Asian Games
Gold medal – first place	1966 Bangkok	Men's team
Silver medal – second place	1962 Jakarta	Men's team
Southeast Asian Games
Gold medal – first place	1961 Rangoon	Mixed doubles
Silver medal – second place	1959 Bangkok	Men's doubles
Silver medal – second place	1961 Rangoon	Men's doubles
Silver medal – second place	1965 Kuala Lumpur	Men's doubles
Silver medal – second place	1967 Bangkok	Men's doubles
Silver medal – second place	1965 Kuala Lumpur	Men's team
Bronze medal – third place	1965 Kuala Lumpur	Mixed doubles

Raphi Kanchanaraphi (1936 – February 19, 2010) was a world-class badminton player who represented both Thailand and Canada in international competition, and won national doubles and mixed doubles titles in both countries.

== Career ==
Known for his anticipation and racket control, Kanchanaraphi was one of a cadre of fine Thai doubles players who helped Thailand to strongly contend for the Thomas Cup (men's international team competition trophy) in both 1961 and 1964. In partnership with Narong Bhornchima, Kanchanaraphi won 15 of his 18 Thomas Cup doubles matches in those two seasons, the wins including both of his doubles matches against Indonesia in the 1961 Challenge Round. Kanchanaraphi and Bhornchima were men's doubles runners-up in the prestigious All-England Championships in 1962, narrowly losing to the famous Danes Finn Kobbero and Jorgen Hammergaard Hansen. In 1969 Kanchanaraphi migrated to Canada where he won more titles, and competed in the Thomas Cup campaigns of 1973 and 1976 for Canada with former Thai teammate Channarong Ratanaseangsuang.

== Achievements ==
=== Southeast Asian Peninsular Games ===
Men's doubles
Year	Venue	Partner	Opponent	Score	Result
1959	Bangkok, Thailand	(Thailand) Narong Bhornchima	(Thailand) Charoen Wattanasin (Thailand) Kamal Sudthivanich	12–15, 14–15	Silver
1961	Yangon, Myanmar	(Thailand) Narong Bhornchima	(Malaysia) Tan Yee Khan (Malaysia) Ng Boon Bee	8–15, 15–6, 10–15	Silver
1965	Selangor Badminton Hall, Kuala Lumpur, Malaysia	(Thailand) Narong Bhornchima	(Malaysia) Tan Yee Khan (Malaysia) Ng Boon Bee	8–15, 11–15	Silver
1967	Bangkok, Thailand	(Thailand) Narong Bhornchima	(Malaysia) Tan Yee Khan (Malaysia) Ng Boon Bee	7–15, 8–15	Silver

Mixed doubles
Year	Venue	Partner	Opponent	Score	Result
1961	Bangkok, Thailand	(Thailand) Pankae Phongarn	(Malaysia) Ng Boon Bee (Malaysia) Ng Mei Ling	14–18, 15–8, 15–9	Gold
1965	Selangor Badminton Hall, Kuala Lumpur, Malaysia	(Thailand) Sumol Chanklum	(South Vietnam) Lâm Trình (South Vietnam) Nguyễn Thị Thúy Hồng	15–8, 15–6	Bronze

=== International tournaments ===
Men's doubles
Year	Tournament	Partner	Opponent	Score	Result
1962	All England	(Thailand) Narong Bhornchima	(Denmark) Finn Kobberø (Denmark) Jørgen Hammergaard Hansen	16–17, 3–15	(silver) Runner-up
1970	Canada Open	(Thailand) Channarong Ratanaseangsuang	(Japan) Ippei Kojima (Japan) Junji Honma	15–10, 15–9	(gold) Winner
1973	Canada Open	(Thailand) Channarong Ratanaseangsuang	(Canada) Jamie Paulson (Canada) Yves Paré	15–9, 10–15, 12–15	(silver) Runner-up
1973	Mexico International	(Thailand) Channarong Ratanaseangsuang	(Canada) Jamie Paulson (Canada) Yves Paré	18–15, 18–15	(gold) Winner

Mixed doubles
Year	Tournament	Partner	Opponent	Score	Result
1974	Canada Open	(Canada) Barbara Welch	(Canada) Rolf Paterson (Canada) Mimi Nilsson	15–5, 15–10	(gold) Winner
