= Ferry Sonneville =

Indonesian badminton player

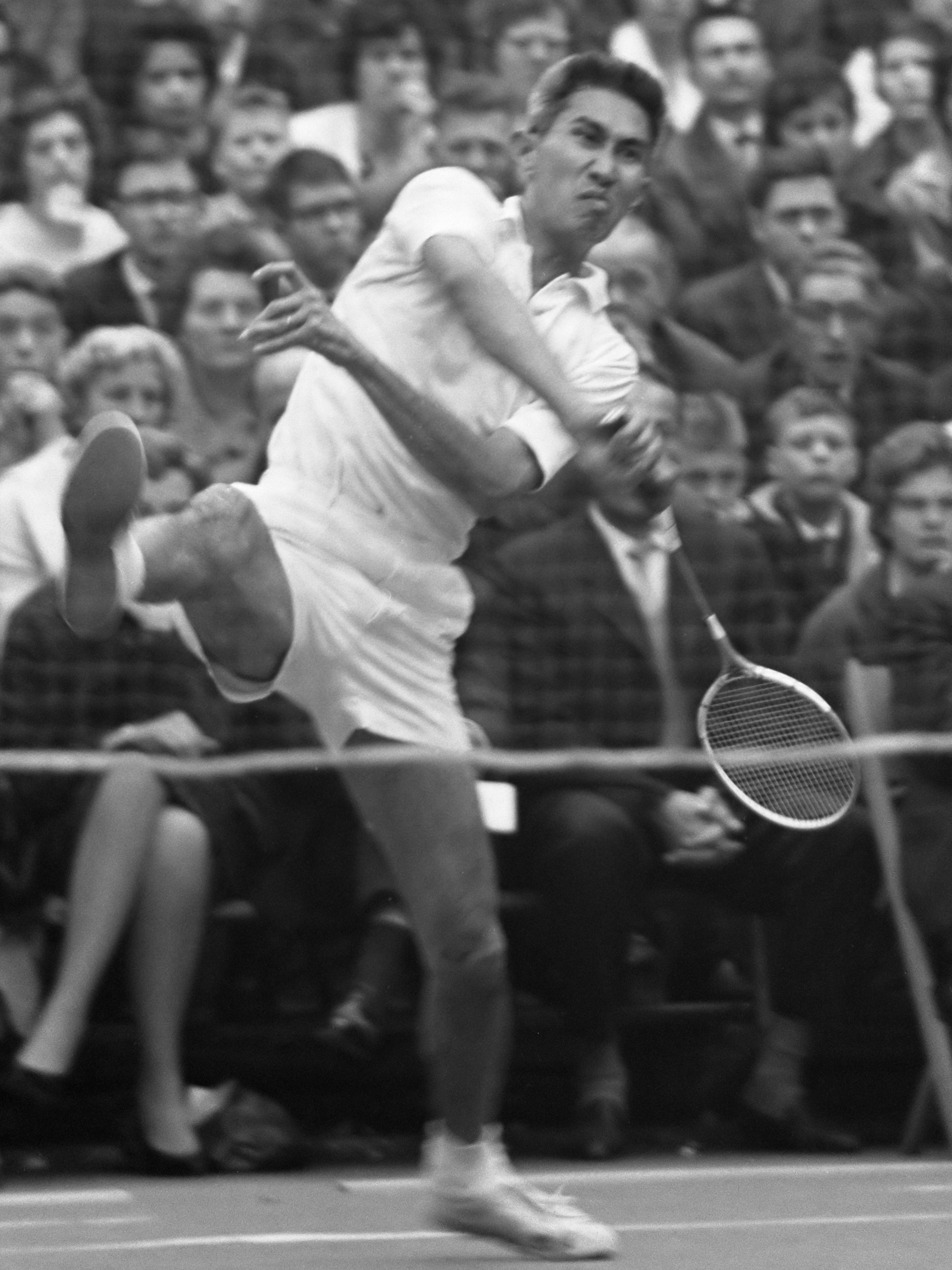
- Sonneville in 1962

Personal information
- Born: Ferdinand Alexander Sonneville; 3 January 1931 Batavia, Dutch East Indies
- Died: 20 November 2003 (aged 72) Jakarta, Indonesia

Sport
- Country: Indonesia
- Sport: Badminton
- Handedness: Right
- Event: Men's singles
Medal record
Men's badminton
Representing Indonesia
Thomas Cup
Gold medal – first place	1958 Singapore	Men's team
Gold medal – first place	1961 Jakarta	Men's team
Gold medal – first place	1964 Tokyo	Men's team
Silver medal – second place	1967 Jakarta	Men's team
Asian Games
Gold medal – first place	1962 Jakarta	Men's team
Bronze medal – third place	1962 Jakarta	Men's singles

Ferdinand Alexander "Ferry" Sonneville (3 January 1931 – 20 November 2003) was an Indonesian badminton player noted for his touch, consistency, tactical astuteness, and coolness under pressure. He won numerous international singles titles from the mid-1950s through the early 1960s and his clutch performances helped Indonesia to win its first three Thomas Cup (men's world team) titles consecutively in 1958, 1961, and 1964, setting the pattern for his country's continued formidable presence in world badminton. Sonneville's playing career ended on a sour note in the 1967 Thomas Cup final in Jakarta when, past his prime, he was roundly booed by his countrymen after dropping singles matches in Indonesia's controversial loss to Malaysia.

After his high-level playing days ended, Sonneville was elected to terms as both president of the International Badminton Federation (now Badminton World Federation) and president of the Badminton Association of Indonesia (PBSI).

== Private life ==
Sonneville inherited his sports talents from his parents. His father was Dirk Jan Sonneville (1906-1944), a local tennis champion in the 1930s, and Leonij Elisabeth de Vogel (later Hubeek) (1908-1989), a badminton champion between 1935 and 1945, who taught him the game in the 1940s. His father was a brigade major of the Royal Netherlands East Indies Army in the war and was executed by the Japanese. Sonneville married Yvonne Theresia de Wit in September 1954 and had 3 children: Ferdinand Rudy Jr. (who died at the age of 21), Genia Theresia, and Cynthia Guedolyn. Sonneville also had two grandchildren. His religion was Catholic.

== Education ==
- Erasmus University, Netherlands.

== Sports career ==
- Jiujitsu Athlete and coach (1949–1955)
- Playing captain or coach when Indonesia won or successfully defended Thomas Cup (world team badminton championships) 3 times in succession (1958, 1961, and 1964).
- Winning Malaysia Open (1955), Dutch Open (1956, 1958, 1960, 1961, 1962), Scotland's World Invitational Tourney (1957), French Open (1957, 1960), German Open (1958, 1960, 1961), Canadian Open (1962), U.S. Open (1962), along with runner-up finish at the All England Championships (1959)
- PB PBSI's founder (1951) and Komite Olahraga Nasional Indonesia's founder (1966)
- KONI's President (1970)
- Member of staff Asian Games Federation Council (1970)
- Chef de Mission Indonesian contingent to Olympic (1971)
- International Federation of Badminton president (1971–1974)
- PBSI's President (1981–1985)

== Achievements ==
=== Asian Games ===
Men's singles
Year	Venue	Opponent	Score	Result	Ref.
1962	Istora Senayan, Jakarta, Indonesia	(Malaysia) Tan Yee Khan		Bronze	

=== International tournaments (16 titles, 12 runners-up) ===
Men's singles
Year	Tournament	Opponent	Score	Result
1954	Selangor Open	(Colony of Singapore) Ong Poh Lim	15–11, 15–8	(gold) Winner
1955	Malaysia Open	(Denmark) Jørn Skaarup	15–5, 15–4	(gold) Winner
1956	Dutch Open	(England) Hugh Findlay	15–3, 15–6	(gold) Winner
1956	German Open	(Malaysia) Eddy Choong	6–15, 0–15	(silver) Runner-up
1957	French Open	(Malaysia) David Choong	15–4, 15–3	(gold) Winner
1957	German Open	(Malaysia) Eddy Choong	12–15, 12–15	(silver) Runner-up
1958	Dutch Open	(Denmark) Erland Kops	15–3, 15–8	(gold) Winner
1958	German Open	(Sweden) Bo Nilsson	15–11, 15–4	(gold) Winner
1959	All England	(Indonesia) Tan Joe Hok	8–15, 15–10, 3–15	(silver) Runner-up
1959	Dutch Open	(Denmark) Knud Aage Nielsen	13–18, 9–15	(silver) Runner-up
1959	Belgian Championships	(Denmark) Knud Aage Nielsen	13–15, 2–15	(silver) Runner-up
1960	Dutch Open	(England) Hugh Findlay	15–11, 15–4	(gold) Winner
1960	French Open	(England) William Havers	15–1, 15–1	(gold) Winner
1960	German Open	(Malaysia) Lee Kin Tat	15–9, 18–13	(gold) Winner
1961	Dutch Open	(Thailand) Charoen Wattanasin	15–8, 15–5	(gold) Winner
1961	German Open	(Malaysia) Lee Kin Tat	15–5, 15–1	(gold) Winner
1961	French Open	(Denmark) Erland Kops	12–15, 10–15	(silver) Runner-up
1962	Dutch Open	(Thailand) Charoen Wattanasin	15–7, 15–3	(gold) Winner
1962	German Open	(Denmark) Erland Kops	10–15, 15–14, 3–15	(silver) Runner-up
1962	Canadian Open	(United States) Jim Poole	17–16, 17–18, 15–9	(gold) Winner
1962	U.S. Open	(Indonesia) Tan Joe Hok	17–15, 18–17	(gold) Winner

Men's doubles
Year	Tournament	Partner	Opponent	Score	Result
1960	French Open	(Malaysia) David Choong	(France) Pierre Lenoir (France) Ghislain Vasseur	15–4, 15–9	(gold) Winner
1962	Canadian Open	(Canada) Jim Carnwath	(United States) Jim Poole (United States) Bobby Williams	6–15, 8–15	(silver) Runner-up
1962	U.S. Open	(Indonesia) Tan Joe Hok	(United States) Joe Alston (United States) Wynn Rogers	12–15, 13–15	(silver) Runner-up
1962	Mexican Open	(Sweden) Berndt Dahlberg	(Denmark) Erland Kops (Indonesia) Tan Joe Hok	7–15, 17–14, 4–15	(silver) Runner-up
1963	All England Open	(Indonesia) Tan Joe Hok	(Denmark) Finn Kobberø (Denmark) Jørgen Hammergaard Hansen	6–15, 5–15	(silver) Runner-up

Mixed doubles
Year	Tournament	Partner	Opponent	Score	Result
1960	French Open	(Indonesia) Yvonne Theresia Sonneville	(Malaysia) Yeoh Kean Hua (England) Rita A. Rabey	Walkover	(gold) Winner
1963	German Open	(Indonesia) Yvonne Theresia Sonneville	(Denmark) Poul-Erik Nielsen (Denmark) Kirsten Thorndahl	4–15, 14–17	(silver) Runner-up

=== Invitational tournament ===
Men's singles
Year	Tournament	Opponent	Score	Result
1956	World Invitational Championships	(United States) Joe Alston	2–15, 15–13, 12–15	Silver
1957	World Invitational Championships	(Malaysia) Eddy Choong	8–15, 6–15	Silver
1958	World Invitational Championships	(Sweden) Berndt Dahlberg	15–0, 17–14	Gold
1960	World Invitational Championships	(Denmark) Finn Kobberø	12–15, 15–4, 3–15	Silver

== Business career ==
- Vayatour Chairman Executive Board Lippo Cikarang
- Ferry Sonneville & Co – owner
- Chairman of Realestat Indonesia Center Council, 1986-1989 periods
- President and member of the Executive Committee Realestat Internasional Federation since 1989
- Advisory Council Chairman – International Executive Service

== Educational career ==
- Pioneer of Trisakti Foundation represent Lembaga Pembinaan Kesatuan Bangsa
- Founder of Himpunan Pembina Perguruan Tinggi Swasta
- Founder of Asosiasi Perguruan Tinggi Katholik Indonesia
- Special Citizen and member of Atma Jaya Foundation
- Member of Fatmawati Foundation
- Member of Bhakti Medika Foundation
- Member of Penyandang Anak Cacat Foundation
- Member of Gedung Arsip Nasional Foundation
- Indonesian Nederland Forum

== Honours ==
- Satya Lencana Kebudayaan (1961)
- Tanda Jasa Bintang RI Kelas II (1964)
- "Knighthood" from Roman Catholic Church (1972)
- FIABCI Medal of Honour, Melbourne (1988).

== Sources ==
- PBSI, DPP REI, Kompas 21/11/03, Media Indonesia 21/11/03/, Sinar Harapan 20/11/03/, Pikiran Rakyat 21/11/03
