= Joseph Cameron Alston =

American badminton player (1926–2008)

Joseph C. Alston
Personal information
- Born: Joseph Cameron Alston; December 20, 1926 San Diego, California
- Died: April 16, 2008 (aged 81)

Sport
- Country: United States
- Sport: Badminton
- Handedness: Right

Joseph Cameron Alston (December 20, 1926 – April 16, 2008) was an American badminton player who won major titles between 1951 and 1967.

== Career ==
Despite a career in the Federal Bureau of Investigation which sometimes interfered with his avocation, Alston is the only male player to win each of the sport's three basic events, singles, doubles, and mixed doubles, at both the U.S. National Badminton Championships (closed to foreign competition) and the U.S. Open Badminton Championships (open to foreign competition). He and long-time partner Wynn Rogers were ranked number one nationally in men's doubles for fourteen consecutive years (1951–1964). In 1957, Alston won the Men's Doubles at the prestigious All-England Championships with Malaya's Johnny Heah and remains the only American to share this title. Noted for his speed and crisp shotmaking, Alston was a member of seven consecutive U.S. Thomas Cup (Men's International) teams between 1952 and 1970 and played in four inter-zone Thomas Cup campaigns. He was featured on the cover of Sports Illustrated on March 7, 1955. His wife, the former Lois Smedley, was an outstanding badminton competitor in her own right and played on the world champion U.S. Uber Cup (Women's International) team of 1957. Both are members of the U.S. Badminton Hall of Fame, now called the Walk of Fame. One of their sons, Tony Alston, was a leading U.S. player in the 1980s.

== Achievements ==
=== International tournaments (8 titles, 11 runners-up) ===
Men's singles
Year	Tournament	Opponent	Score	Result
1954	U.S. Open	(Malaysia) Eddy Choong	5–15, 15–2, 13–15	(silver) Runner-up
1955	U.S. Open	(Malaysia) Eddy Choong	15–5, 15–8	(gold) Winner
1956	U.S. Open	(Denmark) Finn Kobberø	11–15, 8–15	(silver) Runner-up

Men's doubles
Year	Tournament	Partner	Opponent	Score	Result
1955	U.S. Open	(United States) Wynn Rogers	(Malaysia) Eddy Choong (Canada) T. Darryl Thompson	15–6, 12–15, 15–8	(gold) Winner
1957	All England Open	(Malaysia) Heah Hock Aun	(Malaysia) David Choong (Malaysia) Eddy Choong	15–10, 16–17, 15–5	(gold) Winner
1959	U.S. Open	(United States) Wynn Rogers	(Malaysia) Lim Say Hup (Malaysia) Teh Kew San	5–15, 3–15	(silver) Runner-up
1960	Mexico International	(United States) Manuel Armendariz	(Malaysia) Lim Say Hup (Malaysia) Teh Kew San	7–15, 4–15	(silver) Runner-up
1961	U.S. Open	(United States) Wynn Rogers	(United States) Michael Hartgrove (United States) Alan Mahaffey	15–8, 15–9	(gold) Winner
1962	U.S. Open	(United States) Wynn Rogers	(Indonesia) Ferry Sonneville (Indonesia) Tan Joe Hok	15–12, 7–15, 15–6	(gold) Winner
1963	U.S. Open	(United States) Wynn Rogers	(Denmark) Erland Kops (Scotland) Robert McCoig	16–18, 2–15	(silver) Runner-up
1964	U.S. Open	(United States) Wynn Rogers	(United States) Michael Hartgrove (United States) Jim Poole	15–2, 12–15, 15–10	(gold) Winner
1967	U.S. Open	(Denmark) Erland Kops	(India) Suresh Goel (Scotland) Jim Sydie	15–4, 15–4	(gold) Winner

Mixed doubles
Year	Tournament	Partner	Opponent	Score	Result
1954	U.S. Open	(United States) Lois Alston	(United States) Wynn Rogers (United States) Loma Smith	15–10, 15–10	(gold) Winner
1955	U.S. Open	(United States) Lois Alston	(United States) Wynn Rogers (United States) Dorothy Hann	15–8, 11–15, 9–15	(silver) Runner-up
1959	U.S. Open	(United States) Lois Alston	(United States) Michael Roche (United States) Judy Devlin	9–15, 15–10, 15–17	(silver) Runner-up
1961	U.S. Open	(United States) Lois Alston	(United States) Wynn Rogers (United States) Judy Hashman	13–18, 2–15	(silver) Runner-up
1962	U.S. Open	(United States) Helen Tibbetts	(United States) Wynn Rogers (United States) Judy Hashman	4–15, 7–15	(silver) Runner-up
1963	U.S. Open	(United States) Lois Alston	(Thailand) Sangob Rattanusorn (England) Margaret Barrand	16–18, 15–4, 12–15	(silver) Runner-up
1964	U.S. Open	(United States) Lois Alston	(Thailand) Channarong Ratanaseangsuang (England) Margaret Barrand	walkover	(silver) Runner-up

== Summary ==
Tournament	Event and year
US Open	Men's Singles (1955), Men's Doubles (1955, 1961, 1962, 1964, 1967), Mixed Doubles (1954)
US Championships	Men's Singles (1951), Men's Doubles (1951, 1952, 1953) Mixed Doubles (1953)
All-Englands	Men's Doubles (1957)
World Invitational	Men's Singles (1956)
