= Ron Palmer =

Australian former professional rugby league footballer & coach

Personal information
- Full name: Ronnie Palmer
- Born: Australia

Playing information
- Position: Second-row, Centre
Club
Years	Team	Pld	T	G	FG	P
1971–75	Balmain Tigers	34	0	0	0	0
- Source: As of 31 December 2025

Ron Palmer is an Australian former professional rugby league footballer and coach.

== Background ==
Palmer is affectionately known as the "Balmain Charmer".

He qualified as a PE teacher and taught at Holy Cross College, Ryde.

== Career ==
He played for the Balmain Tigers in the New South Wales Rugby League premiership.

Palmer was the strength and conditioning coach for 24 years at the Sydney Roosters. He also held roles at the Gold Coast Titans, Penrith Panthers and the Parramatta Eels before returning to the Wests Tigers as the Performance Coach, a role he held until the end of the 2023 season.

He was also on the coaching staff of the New South Wales Origin team and Australia at representative level.
