= Erland Kops =

Danish badminton player

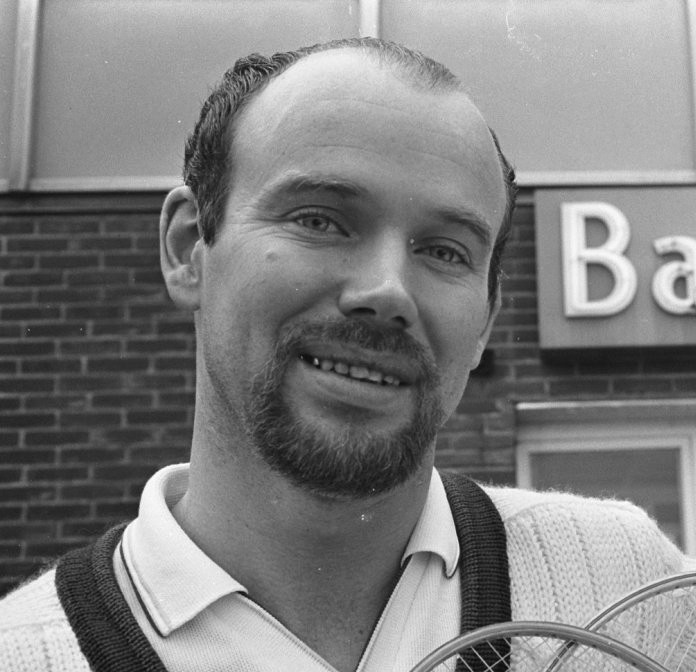
- Kops in 1968

Personal information
- Born: 14 January 1937 Copenhagen, Denmark
- Died: 18 February 2017 (aged 80)

Sport
- Country: Denmark
- Sport: Badminton
- Handedness: Right
- Event: Men's singles & Men's doubles
Medal record
Men's badminton
Representing Denmark
Thomas Cup
Silver medal – second place	1964 Tokyo	Men's team
European Championships
Silver medal – second place	1970 Port Talbot	Men's doubles
Bronze medal – third place	1972 Karlskrona	Men's doubles
European Mixed Team Championships
Silver medal – second place	1972 Karlskrona	Mixed team

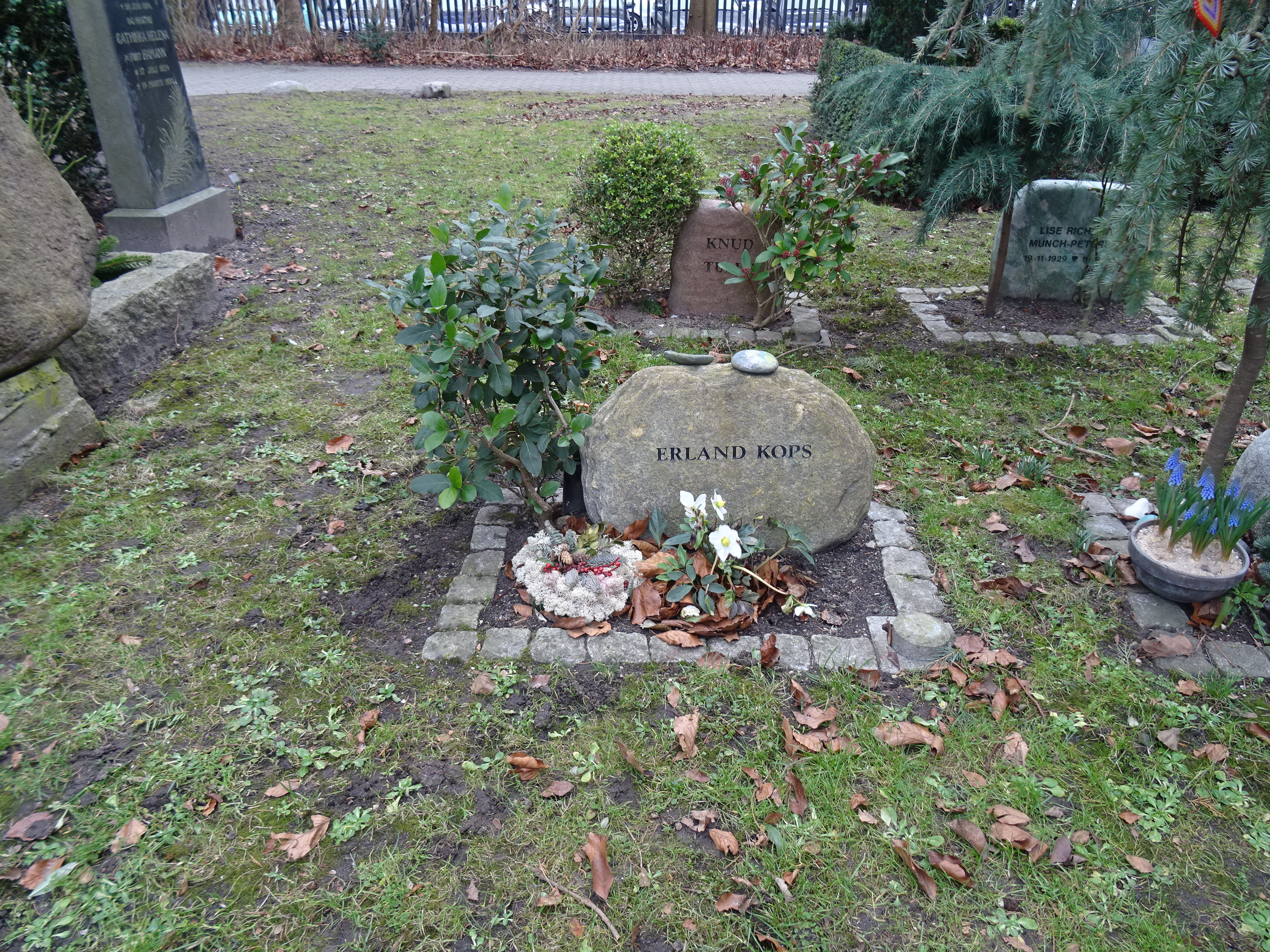
The grave of erland Kops in Copenhagen.

Erland Kops (14 January 1937 – 18 February 2017) was a badminton player from Denmark who won numerous major international singles and doubles titles from the late 1950s to the early 1970s.

== Early life ==
Kops was born in 1937. His uncles were the boxers Ebbe and Poul Kops who both competed at the Summer Olympics. Erland Kops began to play badminton in Københavns Badminton Klub in 1948. He worked for East Asiatic Company in Thailand from 1958 to 1960.

== Career ==
In 1958, Erland Kops brought an end to eight years of dominance of by Malayan players at the All England Badminton Championships by winning its Men's Singles event. Kops was also among the first Westerners to win major singles titles in the Far East. He combined abundant speed, power, and stamina with impressive shot-making virtuosity. Despite some disappointing results in the late rounds of Thomas Cup (men's international team) competition, Kops was clearly the dominant tournament men's singles player and one of the dominant men's doubles players of his era.

He is one of the most successful players ever in the All England Open Badminton Championships, with 11 titles between 1958 and 1967 - 7 of them in men's singles and 4 in men's doubles - breaking the Irish player Frank Devlin´s record of six titles.

Erland Kops also won 5 times the Danish Championships in men's singles and 4 in men's doubles. In the Nordic Championships, Erland Kops obtained the title 5 times in the men's singles category, 3 times in men's doubles and 2 more times in mixed doubles.

Kops played 44 national matches for Denmark from 1957 to 1972.

With no surprise, Erland Kops was among the first group of badminton players inducted into the World Badminton Hall of Fame in 1997, and was the first player to be inducted into the Hall of Fame of the Badminton Europe Confederation (BEC) in 2013.

As a recognition for his sporting achievements, Erland Kops has been honoured with a knighthood from the Danish Queen, an Honorary Membership of The Danish Sports Federation, an Honorary Membership of Badminton Denmark, the Herbert Scheele Trophy from the Badminton World Federation, and being inducted to the Hall of Fame of Danish Sport, as well as being elected the second best Sportsman in Denmark of the 20th century.

== All England performance ==
In 1957, Erland Kops lost the final to the Malayan player Eddie B. Choong, but one year later he defeated Finn Kobberø in the final. In 1959, Tan Joe Hok - from Indonesia - won the championship, then, Erland Kops won it from 1960 to 1963. Finally, Erland Kops won it again two more times in 1965 and 1967. In men's doubles, Erland Kops won the competition teaming up with Poul-Erik Nielsen in 1958 and together with Henning Borch from 1967 to 1969. Kops lost three finals in men's doubles - in 1961 and 1964 together with Poul-Erik Nielsen and against Jorgen Hammergaard / Finn Kobberø, and in 1965 with the Malaysian Oon Choong Jin and against Ng Boon Bee and Tan Yee Khan.

- 1958: Champion - vs Finn Kobberø (Denmark)
- 1960: Champion - vs Charoen Wattanasin (Thailand)
- 1961: Champion - vs Finn Kobberø (Denmark)
- 1962: Champion - vs Charoen Wattanasin (Thailand)
- 1963: Champion - vs Channarong Ratanasaengsuang (Thailand)
- 1965: Champion - vs Tan Aik Huang (Malaysia)
- 1967: Champion - vs Tan Aik Huang (Malaysia)

== Achievements ==
=== European Championships ===
Men's doubles
Year	Venue	Partner	Opponent	Score	Result
1970	Afan Lido, Port Talbot, Wales	(Denmark) Henning Borch	(Denmark) Elo Hansen (Denmark) Per Walsøe	9–15, 15–2, 10–15	Silver
1972	Karlskrona Idrottshall, Karlskrona, Sweden	(Denmark) Elo Hansen	(West Germany) Willi Braun (West Germany) Roland Maywald	13–15, 8–15	Bronze

=== International tournaments ===
Men's singles
Year	Tournament	Opponent	Score	Result
1957	All England	(Malaysia) Eddy Choong	9–15, 3–15	(silver) Runner-up
1958	All England	(Denmark) Finn Kobberø	15–10, 8–15, 15–8	(gold) Winner
1958	Dutch Open	(Indonesia) Ferry Sonneville	3–15, 8–15	(silver) Runner-up
1960	All England	(Thailand) Charoen Wattanasin	15–1, 11–15, 15–6	(gold) Winner
1960	Swiss Open	(Malaysia) Jimmy Lim	15–5, 15–4	(gold) Winner
1961	Canada Open	(Scotland) Robert McCoig	15–2, 15–12	(gold) Winner
1961	All England	(Denmark) Finn Kobberø	15–10, 15–6	(gold) Winner
1961	French Open	(Indonesia) Ferry Sonneville	15–12, 15–10	(gold) Winner
1962	Swedish Open	(Denmark) Knud Aage Nielsen	15–4, 15–9	(gold) Winner
1962	All England	(Thailand) Charoen Wattanasin	15–10, 15–5	(gold) Winner
1962	German Open	(Indonesia) Ferry Sonneville	15–10, 14–15, 15–3	(gold) Winner
1962	Mexico International	(Indonesia) Tan Joe Hok	15–8, 15–9	(gold) Winner
1963	U.S. Open	(Thailand) Channarong Ratanaseangsuang	7–15, 15–5, 15–4	(gold) Winner
1963	Canada Open	(Thailand) Channarong Ratanaseangsuang	15–12, 15–12	(gold) Winner
1963	All England	(Thailand) Channarong Ratanaseangsuang	15–7, 15–7	(gold) Winner
1963	Swedish Open	(Denmark) Knud Aage Nielsen	15–2, 13–15, 15–4	(gold) Winner
1963	German Open	(Denmark) Henning Borch	15–2, 15–3	(gold) Winner
1964	Swedish Open	(Denmark) Poul-Erik Nielsen	15–6, 17–14	(gold) Winner
1964	German Open	(Denmark) Knud Aage Nielsen	15–7, 15–13	(gold) Winner
1965	All England	(Malaysia) Tan Aik Huang	15–13, 15–12	(gold) Winner
1965	U.S. Open	(Thailand) Channarong Ratanaseangsuang	15–11, 15–8	(gold) Winner
1965	Mexico International	(Thailand) Channarong Ratanaseangsuang	15–7, 15–12	(gold) Winner
1965	Swedish Open	(Denmark) Svend Pri	15–1, 15–5	(gold) Winner
1966	German Open	(Denmark) Knud Aage Nielsen	17–18, 15–6, 15–11	(gold) Winner
1966	London Championships	(Denmark) Svend Pri	0–15, 7–15	(silver) Runner-up
1966	Swedish Open	(Denmark) Svend Pri	7–15, 8–15	(silver) Runner-up
1966	French Open	(Indonesia) Ang Tjin Siang	6–15, 15–6, 7–15	(silver) Runner-up
1967	All England	(Malaysia) Tan Aik Huang	15–12, 15–10	(gold) Winner
1967	Singapore Open	(Malaysia) Tan Aik Huang	11–15, 8–15	(silver) Runner-up
1967	U.S. Open	(India) Suresh Goel	15–2, 15–12	(gold) Winner
1967	Dutch Open	(Denmark) Tom Bacher	15–8, 15–9	(gold) Winner
1967	Malaysia Open	(Indonesia) Darmadi	15–10, 15–3	(gold) Winner
1967	Swedish Open	(Denmark) Svend Pri	6–15, 15–9, 7–15	(silver) Runner-up
1967	Norwegian International	(Sweden) Sture Johnsson	15–8, 15–6	(gold) Winner
1967	German Open	(Germany) Wolfgang Bochow	17–14, 15–10	(gold) Winner
1967	Canada Open	(Canada) Wayne Macdonnell	15–11, 15–11	(gold) Winner
1968	German Open	(Malaysia) Tan Aik Huang	9–15, 18–17, 15–5	(gold) Winner
1968	Denmark Open	(Denmark) Svend Pri	7–15, 18–14, 17–16	(gold) Winner
1968	Swedish Open	(Denmark) Svend Pri	5–15, 7–15	(silver) Runner-up
1969	Dutch Open	(Malaysia) Oon Chong Hau	12–15, 4–15	(silver) Runner-up
1970	Denmark Open	(Japan) Ippei Kojima	3–15, 10–15	(silver) Runner-up
1971	Norwegian International	(Denmark) Svend Pri	10–15, 10–15	(silver) Runner-up

Men's doubles
Year	Tournament	Partner	Opponent	Score	Result
1958	All England	(Denmark) Poul-Erik Nielsen	(Denmark) Finn Kobberø (Denmark) Jørgen Hammergaard Hansen	15–7, 11–15, 15–8	(gold) Winner
1958	Dutch Open	(Denmark) Jørgen Hageman	(Malaysia) Oon Chong Jin (Denmark) Arne Rasmussen	15–11, 15–4	(gold) Winner
1959	Malaysia Open	(Malaysia) Eddy Choong	(Malaysia) Teh Kew San (Malaysia) Lim Say Hup	11–15, 9–15	(silver) Runner-up
1960	Swiss Open	(Denmark) Knud E. Jepsen	(Malaysia) Jimmy Lim (Indonesia) Randy Oey	15–2, 15–11	(gold) Winner
1961	Canada Open	(Scotland) Robert McCoig	(Denmark) Finn Kobberø (Denmark) Jørgen Hammergaard Hansen	8–15, 10–15	(silver) Runner-up
1961	French Open	(Denmark) Finn Kobberø	(Malaysia) Oon Chong Teik (Malaysia) Yeoh Kean Hua	15–6, 15–10	(gold) Winner
1962	German Open	(Denmark) Poul-Erik Nielsen	(Denmark) Finn Kobberø (Denmark) Jørgen Hammergaard Hansen	7–15, 13–15	(silver) Runner-up
1962	Mexico International	(Indonesia) Tan Joe Hok	(Sweden) Berndt Dahlberg (Indonesia) Ferry Sonneville	15–7, 14–17, 15–4	(gold) Winner
1963	U.S. Open	(Scotland) Robert McCoig	(United States) Joe Alston (United States) T. Wynn Rogers	18–16, 15–2	(gold) Winner
1963	Canada Open	(Scotland) Robert McCoig	(Thailand) Sangob Rattanusorn (Thailand) Channarong Ratanaseangsuang	15–13, 11–15, 15–13	(gold) Winner
1963	German Open	(Denmark) Poul-Erik Nielsen	(Denmark) Henning Borch (Denmark) Jørgen Mortensen	15–5, 15–3	(gold) Winner
1964	German Open	(Denmark) Poul-Erik Nielsen	(Denmark) Finn Kobberø (Denmark) Jørgen Hammergaard Hansen	15–3, 15–6	(gold) Winner
1964	All England	(Denmark) Poul-Erik Nielsen	(Denmark) Finn Kobberø (Denmark) Jørgen Hammergaard Hansen	6–15, 3–15	(silver) Runner-up
1965	All England	(Malaysia) Oon Chong Jin	(Malaysia) Tan Yee Khan (Malaysia) Ng Boon Bee	7–15, 5–15	(silver) Runner-up
1965	U.S. Open	(Denmark) Knud Aage Nielsen	(Scotland) Robert McCoig (England) Tony Jordan	15–5, 12–15, 11–15	(silver) Runner-up
1965	Mexico International	(United States) Don Paup	(Thailand) Channarong Ratanaseangsuang (Thailand) Paisan Loaharanu	15–9, 15–10	(gold) Winner
1965	Swedish Open	(Denmark) Knud Aage Nielsen	(Denmark) Henning Borch (Denmark) Jørgen Mortensen	15–12, 18–16	(gold) Winner
1966	London Championships	(Denmark) Svend Pri	(England) D.O. Fulton (England) Roger Mills	9–15, 15–7, 15–12	(gold) Winner
1967	Swedish Open	(Denmark) Henning Borch	(Denmark) Per Walsøe (Denmark) Svend Pri	2–15, 12–15	(silver) Runner-up
1967	All England	(Denmark) Henning Borch	(Denmark) Per Walsøe (Denmark) Svend Pri	15–8, 15–12	(gold) Winner
1967	U.S. Open	(United States) Joe Alston	(India) Suresh Goel (Scotland) Jim Sydie	15–4, 15–4	(gold) Winner
1967	Dutch Open	(Denmark) Tom Bacher	(South Africa) Alan Parsons (South Africa) William Kerr	15–4, 15–10	(gold) Winner
1967	Norwegian International	(Denmark) Elo Hansen	(Sweden) Kurt Johnsson (Sweden) Sture Johnsson	15–8, 15–11	(gold) Winner
1967	German Open	(Denmark) Per Walsøe	(Germany) Wolfgang Bochow (Germany) Friedhelm Wulff	15–9, 9–15, 0–15	(silver) Runner-up
1967	Canada Open	(Canada) Rolf Paterson	(England) Colin Beacom (England) Roger Mills	6–15, 7–15	(silver) Runner-up
1968	Swedish Open	(Denmark) Henning Borch	(Denmark) Poul-Erik Nielsen (Denmark) Per Walsøe	15–7, 15–11	(gold) Winner
1968	All England	(Denmark) Henning Borch	(Malaysia) Tan Yee Khan (Malaysia) Ng Boon Bee	15–6, 15–4	(gold) Winner
1969	Swedish Open	(Denmark) Svend Pri	(England) Tony Jordan (England) Roger Mills	15–13, 8–15, 15–11	(gold) Winner
1969	All England	(Denmark) Henning Borch	(England) David Eddy (England) Roger Powell	13–15, 15–10, 15–9	(gold) Winner
1969	Dutch Open	(Denmark) Bjarne Andersen	(Malaysia) Oon Chong Hau (Malaysia) Ho Khim Kooi	15–12, 5–15, 15–5	(gold) Winner
1970	Denmark Open	(Denmark) Henning Borch	(Denmark) Per Walsøe (Denmark) Svend Pri	17–15, 10–15, 15–2	(gold) Winner
1971	Swedish Open	(Denmark) Henning Borch	(Denmark) Per Walsøe (Denmark) Svend Pri	11–15, 11–15	(silver) Runner-up
1971	Dutch Open	(Denmark) Svend Pri	(England) Derek Talbot (England) Elliot Stuart	15–11, 15–5	(gold) Winner
1972	Swedish Open	(Denmark) Svend Pri	(Denmark) Per Walsøe (Denmark) Poul Petersen	15–4, 9–15, 15–12	(gold) Winner
1972	Dutch Open	(Denmark) Svend Pri	(England) Derek Talbot (England) Elliot Stuart	15–6, 11–15, 15–7	(gold) Winner

Mixed doubles
Year	Tournament	Partner	Opponent	Score	Result
1957	German Open	(Denmark) Agnete Friis	(Malaysia) Eddy Choong (England) Barbara Carpenter	15–6, 15–10	(gold) Winner
1960	Swiss Open	(Denmark) Annette Schmidt	(Denmark) Per Nielsen (West Germany) Ute Seelbach	18–15, 15–6	(gold) Winner
1961	French Open	(Denmark) Hanne Jensen	(Denmark) Bengt Nielsen (Denmark) Bitten Nielsen	15–6, 15–10	(gold) Winner
1963	Canada Open	(Canada) Claire Lovett	(Scotland) Robert McCoig (Canada) Claude Lamere	15–7, 7–15, 15–9	(gold) Winner
1966	French Open	(Denmark) Marianne Svensson			(gold) Winner
1967	U.S. Open	(Canada) Mimi Nilsson	(Scotland) Jim Sydie (United States) Judy Hashman	13–18, 6–15	(silver) Runner-up
1969	U.S. Open	(Denmark) Pernille Mølgaard Hansen	(United States) Don Paup (United States) Helen Tibbetts	15–6, 13–15, 15–7	(gold) Winner
1971	Norwegian International	(Denmark) Lene Køppen	(Sweden) Gert Perneklo (Sweden) Eva Twedberg	15–3, 5–15, 10–15	(silver) Runner-up

== Summary ==
Rank	Event	Date	Venue
Danish National Championships
1	Singles	1961, 1962, 1964, 1965, 1967	Copenhagen
1	Men's doubles	1961, 1965, 1968, 1969	
Nordic Championships
1	Singles	1964, 1965, 1966, 1966, 1967	Various locations
1	Men's doubles	1964, 1965, 1966, 1967, 1971	
1	Mixed doubles	1965, 1967	
European Championships
2	Men's doubles	1970	Port Talbot, WAL
3	Men's doubles	1972	Karlskrona, SWE
Open Championships
1	Singles	1958, 1960, 1961, 1962, 1963, 1965, 1967	All England Open
1	Men's doubles	1958, 1967, 1968, 1969	All England Open
2	Singles	1957	All England Open
2	Men's doubles	1961, 1964, 1965	All England Open
1	Singles	1961	French Open
1	Men's doubles	1961	French Open
1	Mixed doubles	1961, 1966	French Open
1	Singles	1961, 1963, 1967	Canadian Open
1	Men's doubles	1963	Canadian Open
1	Mixed doubles	1963	Canadian Open
1	Singles	1968	Denmark Open
1	Men's doubles	1970	Denmark Open
1	Singles	1967, 1968	Dutch Open
1	Men's doubles	1958, 1967, 1969, 1971, 1972	Dutch Open
1	Singles	1962, 1963, 1964, 1966, 1967, 1968	German Open
1	Men's doubles	1963, 1964	German Open
1	Singles	1967	Malaysia Open
1	Singles	1962, 1965	Mexican Open
1	Men's doubles	1962, 1965	Mexican Open
1	Singles	1967	Norwegian International
1	Men's doubles	1967	Norwegian International
1	Singles	1962, 1963, 1964, 1965	Swedish Open
1	Men's doubles	1965, 1968, 1969, 1972	Swedish Open
1	Singles	1960	Swiss Open
1	Men's doubles	1960	Swiss Open
1	Mixed doubles	1960	Swiss Open
1	Singles	1963, 1965, 1967	U.S. Open
1	Men's doubles	1963, 1967	U.S. Open
1	Mixed doubles	1969	U.S. Open
Other National Championships
1	Singles	1959	All-India Championships
1	Men's doubles	1959	All-India Championships
1	Mixed doubles	1959	All-India Championships
1	Singles	1959	Thailand National Championships
