= Tan Joe Hok =

Indonesian badminton player (1937–2025)

Hendra Kartanegara
Personal information
- Born: Tan Joe Hok; 11 August 1937 Bandung, Dutch East Indies
- Died: 2 June 2025 (aged 87) Jakarta, Indonesia

Sport
- Country: Indonesia
- Sport: Badminton
Medal record
Men's badminton
Representing Indonesia
Thomas Cup
Gold medal – first place	1958 Singapore	Men's team
Gold medal – first place	1961 Jakarta	Men's team
Gold medal – first place	1964 Tokyo	Men's team
Asian Games
Gold medal – first place	1962 Jakarta	Men's singles
Gold medal – first place	1962 Jakarta	Men's team
Silver medal – second place	1962 Jakarta	Men's doubles

Tan Joe Hok (Indonesian name: Hendra Kartanegara, Chinese: 陳有福; pinyin: Chén Youfu; Pe̍h-ōe-jī: Tân Iú-hok; 11 August 1937 – 2 June 2025) was an Indonesian badminton player, who along with Ferry Sonneville and a cadre of fine doubles players set the foundation for an Indonesian badminton dynasty by dethroning then-perennial Thomas Cup champion Malaya in 1958.

Tan Joe Hok lived in Bandung until he finished high school. He received his degree in Chemistry and Biology from Baylor University, Texas, United States.

He was the first Indonesian to win the All England Open in 1959 and the first Indonesian to win a gold medal in Asian Games, which happened at home in 1962. He won both the U.S. Open and Canadian Open singles titles consecutively in 1959 and 1960. He had many other notable achievements in the badminton field, both as a player and a coach, most particularly, winning all but one of his singles matches for Indonesia's world champion Thomas Cup (men's international) teams of 1958, 1961, and 1964.

== Background ==
Tan was born on 11 August 1937 in Bandung. From 1959 to 1963, he studied Premed in Chemistry & Biology at Baylor University in the U.S. state of Texas.

He married former badminton player Goei Kiok Nio in 1965 and they have two children. Tan Joe Hok had a difficulty establishing full citizenship in Indonesia because he could not obtain an SBKRI, a mandatory document for non-indigenous and especially Chinese-Indonesian during the U.S.-backed dictatorship of Suharto. He said, "It wouldn't be hard for us to move overseas but we don't want to do that because we are Indonesians. Even if it was raining gold overseas, we will remain here, in the land where Indonesian blood has been spilled."

Tan died after suffering stroke in Jakarta, on 2 June 2025, at the age of 87.

== Career and achievements ==
- Won the National Championships at Surabaya (1956)
- Member of Squad Indonesian Team that won the Thomas Cup at Singapore (1958)
- First Indonesian badminton men's player to win All England (1959)
- First Indonesian badminton men's player to win Asian Games gold medal (1962)
- Member of Squad Team Thomas Cup Indonesia (1964–1967)
- Badminton coach at Mexico (1969–1970)
- Badminton coach at Hong Kong (1971)
- Coach of Indonesia Thomas Cup Team at Kuala Lumpur (1984)
- Badminton coach at PB Djarum Kudus
- Mandala Pest Control Director (since 1973)
- Best Sport Coach by SIWO/PWI Jaya version (1984)

=== Asian Games ===
Men's singles
Year	Venue	Opponent	Score	Result
1962	Istora Senayan, Jakarta, Indonesia	(Malaysia) Teh Kew San	15–9, 15–3	Gold

Men's doubles
Year	Venue	Partner	Opponent	Score	Result
1962	Istora Senayan, Jakarta, Indonesia	(Indonesia) Liem Tjeng Kiang	(Malaysia) Ng Boon Bee (Malaysia) Tan Yee Khan	13–15, 17–18	Silver

=== International tournaments (10 titles, 7 runners-up) ===
Men's singles
Year	Tournament	Opponent	Score	Result
1957	India Championships	(India) Amrit Dewan	15–2, 15–7	(gold) Winner
1958	East India Championships	(Indonesia) Eddy Yusuf	15–10, 15–9	(gold) Winner
1959	All England Open	(Indonesia) Ferry Sonneville	15–8, 10–15, 15–3	(gold) Winner
1959	Thailand Championships	(Thailand) Charoen Wattanasin	15–10, 9–15, 15–6	(gold) Winner
1959	Canadian Open	(Thailand) Charoen Wattanasin	15–4, 15–10	(gold) Winner
1959	U.S. Open	(Thailand) Charoen Wattanasin	7–15, 15–5, 18–14	(gold) Winner
1960	Canadian Open	(Denmark) Finn Kobberø	10–15, 15–8, 15–13	(gold) Winner
1960	U.S. Open	(Thailand) Charoen Wattanasin	15–6, 15–8	(gold) Winner
1962	U.S. Open	(Indonesia) Ferry Sonneville	15–17, 17–18	(silver) Runner-up
1962	Mexican Open	(Denmark) Erland Kops	8–15, 9–15	(silver) Runner-up

Men's doubles
Year	Tournament	Partner	Opponent	Score	Result
1960	Canadian Open	(Thailand) Charoen Wattanasin	(Malaysia) Lim Say Hup (Malaysia) Teh Kew San	8–15, 8–15	(silver) Runner-up
1962	U.S. Open	(Indonesia) Ferry Sonneville	(United States) Joe Alston (United States) Wynn Rogers	12–15, 13–15	(silver) Runner-up
1962	Mexican Open	(Denmark) Erland Kops	(Sweden) Berndt Dahlberg (Indonesia) Ferry Sonneville	15–7, 14–17, 15–4	(gold) Winner
1963	All England Open	(Indonesia) Ferry Sonneville	(Denmark) Jørgen Hammergaard Hansen (Denmark) Finn Kobberø	6–15, 5–15	(silver) Runner-up
1969	Canadian Open	(Thailand) Charoen Wattanasin	(England) Tony Jordan (Scotland) Robert McCoig	7–15, 6–15	(silver) Runner-up

Mixed doubles
Year	Tournament	Partner	Opponent	Score	Result
1960	Canadian Open	(India) Sushila Kapadia	(Denmark) Finn Kobberø (Canada) Jean Miller	7–15, 7–15	(silver) Runner-up
1967	Malaysia Open	(Indonesia) Retno Kustijah	(Indonesia) Darmadi (Indonesia) Minarni	15–9, 15–8	(gold) Winner

== See also ==
- Famous Indonesian Chinese
- Indonesian Chinese
- Asian Games
- All England Open Badminton Championships
