= 1958 Thomas Cup =

Tournament details
- Dates: 5 – 15 June 1958
- Edition: 4th
- Level: International
- Nations: 5
- Venue: Singapore Badminton Stadium
- Location: Singapore

The 1958 Thomas Cup competition is an international team tournament for supremacy in men's badminton (its female counterpart is the Uber Cup). Beginning in 1948–49 it was held every three years until 1982 and has been held every two years thereafter. Nineteen teams contested for the Thomas Cup during the 1957-1958 season. As defending champion Malaya (now Malaysia) was exempt until the conclusive tie (team match) called the challenge round. The other eighteen teams were divided into four qualifying zones; Asia, Australasia, Europe, and Pan America; with the winners of each intra-zone competition advancing to inter-zone competition in Singapore to determine a challenger to Malaya. For a more detailed description of the Thomas Cup format see Wikipedia's general article on the Thomas Cup.

== Qualification ==
Means of qualification	Date	Venue	Slot	Qualified teams
1955 Thomas Cup	24 May – 5 June 1955	Singapore	1	Malaya
Asian Zone	19 July 1957 – 27 March 1958	Bangkok; Colombo; Hong Kong; Rangoon	1	Thailand
American Zone	28 February – 1 March 1958	Long Beach	1	United States
European Zone	16 November 1957 – 11 March 1958	Belfast; Borås; Copenhagen; Le Havre	1	Denmark
Australasian Zone	11 – 18 October 1957	Invercargill; Melbourne	1	Indonesia
Total			5	

Winner of the previous two Asian zone competitions, India was decisively beaten 8–1 in the first round by a fast improving Thailand. Thailand went on to win the zone by shutting out Pakistan (9–0). In the Australasian zone, first time participant Indonesia served notice of international badminton's future by shutting out both New Zealand and Australia to advance to inter-zone play.

Denmark again advanced easily through the European zone. The Danes now had newly crowned All-England singles champion Erland Kops along with Finn Kobbero, both in their early twenties. For the third straight time only United States and Canada contested in the Pan America zone. The all-Californian U.S. squad shut out a Canadian team whose best players in past meetings between the two were now either long in years or losing interest.

== Knockout stage ==
The following teams, shown by region, qualified for the 1958 Thomas Cup. Defending champion and host Malaya automatically qualified to defend the title it had won three years previously.

=== Bracket ===
First round
Malaya
Bye
5 June 1958 – Singapore
United States	2
Thailand	7
7 June 1958 – Singapore
Indonesia	6
Denmark	3

Second round
Malaya
Bye
10 June 1958 – Singapore
Thailand	1
Indonesia	8

Challenge round
14 June 1958 – Singapore
Malaya	3
Indonesia	6

=== First round ===
5 June 1958
6 June 1958

United States	2–7	Thailand
Report

Singapore Badminton Stadium, Singapore

7 June 1958
8 June 1958

Denmark	3–6	Indonesia
Report

Singapore Badminton Stadium, Singapore

=== Second round ===
10 June 1958
11 June 1958

Indonesia	8–1	Thailand
Report

Singapore Badminton Stadium, Singapore

=== Final ===
14 June 1958
15 June 1958

Malaya	3–6	Indonesia
Report

Singapore Badminton Stadium, Singapore

1958 Thomas Cup winner

Indonesia
First title
