= 1964 Thomas Cup knockout stage =

Badminton tournament

The knockout stage for the 1964 Thomas Cup began on 14 May 1964 with the first-round knockout and ended on 22 May with the final tie.

== Qualified teams ==
The teams that won their zonal tie qualified for the final knockout stage.

Group	Winners
CH	Indonesia
AS	Thailand
AM	Japan
AU	Malaysia
EU	Denmark

== Bracket ==
First round
Indonesia
Bye
14 May 1964 – Tokyo
Malaysia	2
Denmark	7
14 May 1964 – Tokyo
Japan	3
Thailand	6

Second round
Indonesia
Bye
17 May 1964 – Tokyo
Denmark	6
Thailand	3

Challenge round
21 May 1964 – Tokyo
Indonesia	5
Denmark	4

== First round ==
Collectively, the players contesting in Tokyo in mid May were probably the strongest group that had yet appeared at the final venue of the Thomas Cup competition. Even "third string" singles matches often pitted true world class opponents against each other. With more difficulty than might have been expected, Thailand eliminated the host country's team 6–3. Ratanaseangsuang and Wattanasin won hard-fought singles matches, but the vaunted Thai doubles teams could earn only a split with their equally quick and aggressive Japanese counterparts. Yoshinori Itagaki had a hand in two winning matches for Japan.

In the other first round match, Denmark's powerful singles lineup shutout Malaya's, though individual matches were competitive. Eighteen-year-old Tan Aik Huang served notice of future achievement by earning twenty-six points from Erland Kops. Denmark advanced 7–2 with Malaya's wins coming against the Danish "second string" doubles.

=== Thailand vs Japan ===
Thailand
6
Tokyo Metropolitan Gymnasium
14–15 May 1964

Japan
3

			1	2	3
1	(Thailand) (Japan)	Channarong Ratanaseangsuang; Yoshio Komiya	10; 15	15; 8	15; 7
2	(Thailand) (Japan)	Charoen Wattanasin; Takeshi Miyanaga	15; 9	15; 5
3	(Thailand) (Japan)	Narong Bhornchima / Raphi Kanchanaraphi; Eiichi Nagai / Eiichi Sakai	15; 11	11; 15	13; 15
4	(Thailand) (Japan)	Chavalert Chumkum / Sangob Rattanusorn; Yoshinori Itagaki / Yoshio Komiya	7; 15	11; 15
5	(Thailand) (Japan)	Charoen Wattanasin; Yoshio Komiya	17; 14	15; 7
6	(Thailand) (Japan)	Channarong Ratanaseangsuang; Takeshi Miyanaga	18; 13	15; 11
7	(Thailand) (Japan)	Sangob Rattanusorn; Yoshinori Itagaki	15; 6	15; 17	7; 15
8	(Thailand) (Japan)	Narong Bhornchima / Raphi Kanchanaraphi; Yoshinori Itagaki / Yoshio Komiya	6; 15	15; 10	15; 10
9	(Thailand) (Japan)	Chavalert Chumkum / Sangob Rattanusorn; Eiichi Nagai / Eiichi Sakai	15; 12	10; 15	15; 4

=== Denmark vs Malaysia ===
Denmark
7
Tokyo Metropolitan Gymnasium
14–15 May 1964

Malaysia
2

			1	2	3
1	(Denmark) (Malaysia)	Erland Kops; Teh Kew San	15; 8	15; 9
2	(Denmark) (Malaysia)	Knud Aage Nielsen; Tan Aik Huang	15; 12	15; 2
3	(Denmark) (Malaysia)	Jørgen Hansen / Finn Kobberø; Ng Boon Bee / Tan Yee Khan	15; 11	15; 8
4	(Denmark) (Malaysia)	Erland Kops / Poul-Erik Nielsen; Lim Say Hup / Teh Kew San	9; 15	17; 14	2; 15
5	(Denmark) (Malaysia)	Knud Aage Nielsen; Teh Kew San	15; 10	10; 15	15; 12
6	(Denmark) (Malaysia)	Erland Kops; Tan Aik Huang	17; 16	15; 10
7	(Denmark) (Malaysia)	Henning Borch; Yew Cheng Hoe	15; 11	15; 8
8	(Denmark) (Malaysia)	Jørgen Hansen / Finn Kobberø; Lim Say Hup / Teh Kew San	15; 7	13; 18	15; 12
9	(Denmark) (Malaysia)	Erland Kops / Poul-Erik Nielsen; Ng Boon Bee / Tan Yee Khan	15; 17	9; 15

== Consolation playoff ==
The teams that were defeated in the first round were relegated to a consolation playoff. Malaysia, who lost to Denmark in the first round, defeated hosts Japan, who were defeated by Thailand in the second round.

=== Malaysia vs Japan ===
Malaysia
7
Tokyo Metropolitan Gymnasium
17–18 May 1964

Japan
2

			1	2	3
1	(Malaysia) (Japan)	Tan Aik Huang; Yoshio Komiya	18; 15	15; 3
2	(Malaysia) (Japan)	Billy Ng; Takeshi Miyanaga	15; 17	11; 15
3	(Malaysia) (Japan)	Ng Boon Bee / Tan Yee Khan; Eiichi Nagai / Eiichi Sakai	15; 3	15; 3
4	(Malaysia) (Japan)	Lim Say Hup / Teh Kew San; Yoshinori Itagaki / Yoshio Komiya	15; 10	8; 15	6; 15
5	(Malaysia) (Japan)	Teh Kew San; Yoshinori Itagaki	15; 9	15; 4
6	(Malaysia) (Japan)	Billy Ng; Yoshio Komiya	15; 12	15; 10
7	(Malaysia) (Japan)	Tan Aik Huang; Takeshi Miyanaga	15; 3	15; 10
8	(Malaysia) (Japan)	Lim Say Hup / Teh Kew San; Eiichi Nagai / Eiichi Sakai	6; 15	15; 6	15; 12
9	(Malaysia) (Japan)	Ng Boon Bee / Tan Yee Khan; Yoshinori Itagaki / Yoshio Komiya	11; 15	17; 14	15; 2

== Second round ==
=== Denmark vs Thailand ===
The inter-zone final between Denmark and Thailand was a fierce struggle featuring five three game matches. Denmark won four of the five to avenge its 1961 defeat and squeeze past Thailand 6–3. Kobbero and Hammergaard Hansen "got even" with the same pairs (Bhornchima and Kanchanaraphi; Chumkum and Vatanatham) that had defeated them in 61 minutes. Kops won three game singles matches against both Ratanaseangsuang and Wattanasin. As had happened against Malaya, however, he lost both of his doubles matches paired with Poul-Erik Nielsen.

The result of the Danish strategy of using Erland Kops in the maximum number of matches in all ties was that he had now played 20 pressure filled games (twice as many as any of his teammates) without losing a singles match but without winning a doubles. This strategy was not altered, however, for the decisive challenge round against Indonesia.

Thailand
3
Tokyo Metropolitan Gymnasium
17–18 May 1964

Denmark
6

			1	2	3
1	(Thailand) (Denmark)	Channarong Ratanaseangsuang; Erland Kops	11; 15	15; 13	4; 15
2	(Thailand) (Denmark)	Charoen Wattanasin; Knud Aage Nielsen	15; 12	12; 15	10; 15
3	(Thailand) (Denmark)	Chavalert Chumkum / Chuchart Vatanatham; Jørgen Hansen / Finn Kobberø	12; 15	11; 15
4	(Thailand) (Denmark)	Narong Bhornchima / Raphi Kanchanaraphi; Erland Kops / Poul-Erik Nielsen	17; 14	18; 14
5	(Thailand) (Denmark)	Channarong Ratanaseangsuang; Knud Aage Nielsen	15; 10	15; 2
6	(Thailand) (Denmark)	Charoen Wattanasin; Erland Kops	15; 11	9; 15	5; 15
7	(Thailand) (Denmark)	Narong Bhornchima; Henning Borch	5; 15	16; 17
8	(Thailand) (Denmark)	Chavalert Chumkum / Chuchart Vatanatham; Erland Kops / Henning Borch	15; 9	1; 15	15; 6
9	(Thailand) (Denmark)	Narong Bhornchima / Raphi Kanchanaraphi; Finn Kobberø / Jørgen Hansen	13; 15	15; 5	12; 15

== Challenge round ==
=== Indonesia vs Denmark ===
Though Indonesia's doubles teams had contributed to its Thomas Cup successes in 1958 and in 1961, its singles players had led the way by losing only two matches in thirty and none in either Challenge Round. By 1964, however, "big guns" Tan Joe Hok and Ferry Sonneville were seemingly past their primes. Though only 26, Tan Joe Hok had been busy with studies and had played tournaments only infrequently and not very successfully over the previous two seasons. Sonneville was 33 and his last major tournament victories were also about two years old.

The Thomas Cup competition, however, brought out the best in these two players. It also brought out the worst in some of Indonesia's fans in Tokyo whose behavior crossed the line from rabid cheering and barracking to outright interference with play. Especially egregious was the deliberate use of flash photography when Danish players were facing their cameras. Ultimately, Denmark's Erland Kops became something of a "goat" losing to both Tan Joe Hok and Ferry Sonneville, despite being 14–6 up in the second game against Sonneville after winning the first. Sonneville also beat All-England champion Knud Aage Nielsen who was able to gain a split by defeating Tan in three games.

With the victory of Indonesia's "secret weapon" Ang Tjin Siang (later known as Muljadi) over Borch, the Indonesians, against form, took four of the five singles matches. Nevertheless, with the brilliant Kobbero and Hammergaard Hansen unbeaten throughout the entire campaign, the Danes still had a chance at 3–4 when Erland Kops and Borch met Tan King Gwan and Abdul Patah Unang in the eighth match of the tie. When the Danes won the first game at 15-12 crowd dissension became so intense that play was delayed for 20 minutes. After it resumed the Indonesians gradually gained control of the match to win it 15–6 in the third. The Cup, once again, had eluded Denmark's grasp. An official Danish protest against the result was eventually denied by the International Badminton Federation (now the Badminton World Federation).

Indonesia
5
Tokyo Metropolitan Gymnasium
21–22 May 1964

Denmark
4

			1	2	3
1	(Indonesia) (Denmark)	Tan Joe Hok; Erland Kops	5; 15	15; 1	15; 9
2	(Indonesia) (Denmark)	Ferry Sonneville; Knud Aage Nielsen	12; 15	15; 6	15; 6
3	(Indonesia) (Denmark)	Tan King Gwan / Abdul Patah Unang; Jørgen Hansen / Finn Kobberø	5; 15	6; 15
4	(Indonesia) (Denmark)	Ferry Sonneville / Tutang Djamaluddin; Erland Kops / Henning Borch	12; 15	2; 15
5	(Indonesia) (Denmark)	Ang Tjin Siang; Henning Borch	15; 10	15; 5
6	(Indonesia) (Denmark)	Tan Joe Hok; Knud Aage Nielsen	15; 11	14; 17	9; 15
7	(Indonesia) (Denmark)	Ferry Sonneville; Erland Kops	13; 18	17; 14	17; 14
8	(Indonesia) (Denmark)	Tan King Gwan / Abdul Patah Unang; Erland Kops / Henning Borch	12; 15	15; 12	15; 6
9	(Indonesia) (Denmark)	Ferry Sonneville / Tutang Djamaluddin; Jørgen Hansen / Finn Kobberø	14; 17	5; 15
