= 1964 Thomas Cup qualification =

Tournament details
- Dates: 29 July 1963 – 22 March 1964
- Location: Asian zone: Taipei American zone: Kingston; Mexico City; Vancouver; Victoria; European zone: Belfast; Copenhagen; Dublin; Edinburgh; Euskirchen; Haarlem; Halmstad; Oslo; Rotherham Australasian zone: Auckland; Invercargill; Perth; Wellington

The qualifying process for the 1964 Thomas Cup took place from 6 September 1963 to 22 March 1964 to decide the final teams which will play in the final tournament.

== Qualification process ==
The qualification process is divided into four regions, the Asian Zone, the American Zone, the European Zone and the Australasian Zone. Teams in their respective zone will compete in a knockout format. Teams will compete for two days, with two singles and doubles played on the first day and three singles and two doubles played on the next day. The teams that win their respective zone will earn a place in the final tournament to be held in Tokyo.

Indonesia were the champions of the last Thomas Cup, therefore the team automatically qualified for the inter-zone play-offs.

=== Qualified teams ===
Country	Qualified as	Qualified on	Final appearance
Indonesia	1958 Thomas Cup winners	11 June 1961	3rd
Thailand	Asian Zone winners	26 January 1964	3rd
Denmark	European Zone winners	22 March 1964	6th
Japan	American Zone winners	14 March 1964	1st
Malaysia	Australasian Zone winners	22 September 1963	5th

== Asian Zone ==
=== Bracket ===
Semi-finals
September 1963 – Colombo
Republic оf China	w/o
Ceylon
December 1963 – Bangkok
Hong Kong
Thailand	w/o

Final
25 January 1964 – Taipei
Republic of China	0
Thailand	9

=== Semi-finals ===
Thailand and the Republic of China automatically qualified for the Asian zone final after Ceylon and Hong Kong withdrew from the competition.

=== Final ===
Thailand
9
Taipei, Taiwan
25–26 January 1964

Republic оf China
0

			1	2	3
1	(Thailand) (Taiwan)	Charoen Wattanasin; Wang Yuan-lin	15; 6	15; 7
2	(Thailand) (Taiwan)	Sangob Rattanusorn; Liang Ching-yu	15; 11	15; 8
3	(Thailand) (Taiwan)	Narong Bhornchima / Raphi Kanchanaraphi; Lu Wen-hui / Wang Yuan-lin	15; 6	15; 6
4	(Thailand) (Taiwan)	Chavalert Chumkum / Chuchart Vatanatham; Chen Yu-chieh / Ho Wen-ming	15; 3	15; 3
5	(Thailand) (Taiwan)	Sangob Rattanusorn; Wang Yuan-lin	15; 4	15; 1
6	(Thailand) (Taiwan)	Charoen Wattanasin; Liang Ching-yu	15; 5	15; 6
7	(Thailand) (Taiwan)	Narong Bhornchima; Lu Wen-hui	15; 13	10; 15	15; 1
8	(Thailand) (Taiwan)	Chavalert Chumkum / Chuchart Vatanatham; Lu Wen-hui / Wang Yuan-lin	15; 11	15; 5
9	(Thailand) (Taiwan)	Narong Bhornchima / Raphi Kanchanaraphi; Chen Yu-chieh / Ho Wen-ming	15; 3	15; 3

== American Zone ==
=== Bracket ===
First round
United States
Bye
Jamaica
Bye
22 February 1964 – Mexico City
Japan	9
Mexico	0
Bye
Canada

Semi-finals
7 February 1964 – Kingston
United States	9
Jamaica	0
6 March 1964 – Vancouver
Japan	8
Canada	1

Final
13 March 1964 – Victoria
United States	2
Japan	7

=== First round ===
Japan
9
Mexico City, Mexico
22–23 February 1964

Mexico
0

			1	2	3
1	(Japan) (Mexico)	Yoshio Komiya; Sergio Fraustro	15; 2	15; 11
2	(Japan) (Mexico)	Takeshi Miyanaga; Antonio Rangel	18; 13	11; 15	15; 7
3	(Japan) (Mexico)	Eiichi Nagai / Eiichi Sakai; Guillermo Allier / Oscar Lujan	15; 4	15; 2
4	(Japan) (Mexico)	Yoshinori Itagaki / Yoshio Komiya; Antonio Rangel / Raúl Rangel	15; 1	15; 3
5	(Japan) (Mexico)	Takeshi Miyanaga; Raúl Rangel	15; 4	15; 6
6	(Japan) (Mexico)	Yoshio Komiya; Antonio Rangel	13; 15	15; 12	15; 11
7	(Japan) (Mexico)	Eiichi Nagai; Oscar Lujan	15; 3	13; 18	15; 8
8	(Japan) (Mexico)	Yoshinori Itagaki / Yoshio Komiya; Guillermo Allier / Oscar Lujan	15; 4	15; 4
9	(Japan) (Mexico)	Eiichi Nagai / Eiichi Sakai; Manuel Ordorica / Antonio Rangel	15; 1	15; 3

=== Semi-finals ===
Japan
8
Vancouver, Canada
22–23 February 1964

Canada
1

			1	2	3
1	(Japan) (Canada)	Yoshio Komiya; Wayne Macdonnell	12; 15	15; 11	15; 18
2	(Japan) (Canada)	Takeshi Miyanaga; Bruce Rollick	12; 15	15; 11	15; 8
3	(Japan) (Canada)	Yoshinori Itagaki / Yoshio Komiya; Edward Paterson / Rolf Paterson	11; 15	15; 5	15; 3
4	(Japan) (Canada)	Eiichi Nagai / Eiichi Sakai; Bert Fergus / Wayne Macdonnell	15; 5	15; 2
5	(Japan) (Canada)	Takeshi Miyanaga; Wayne Macdonnell	15; 10	11; 15	18; 15
6	(Japan) (Canada)	Yoshio Komiya; Bruce Rollick	15; 3	15; 3
7	(Japan) (Canada)	Eiichi Nagai; Bert Fergus	15; 5	15; 2
8	(Japan) (Canada)	Yoshinori Itagaki / Yoshio Komiya; Bert Fergus / Wayne Macdonnell	15; 1	15; 6
9	(Japan) (Canada)	Eiichi Nagai / Eiichi Sakai; Edward Paterson / Rolf Paterson	15; 12	15; 12

United States
9
Kingston, Jamaica
22–23 February 1964

Jamaica
0

			1	2	3
1	(United States) (Jamaica)	Donald C. Paup; Keith Palmer	15; 1	15; 4
2	(United States) (Jamaica)	Manuel Armendariz; Ernest Hew	15; 1	15; 1
3	(United States) (Jamaica)	Jim Lynch / Donald C. Paup; Nigel Casserley / Keith Palmer	15; 9	15; 4
4	(United States) (Jamaica)	Joey Alston / Michael Hartgrove; Brendan Clear / Ernest Hew	15; 2	15; 5
5	(United States) (Jamaica)	Manuel Armendariz; Keith Palmer	15; 3	15; 0
6	(United States) (Jamaica)	Donald C. Paup; Ernest Hew	15; 11	15; 4
7	(United States) (Jamaica)	Richard Gorman; Richard Roberts	15; 12	15; 7
8	(United States) (Jamaica)	Jim Lynch / Donald C. Paup; Brendan Clear / Ernest Hew	15; 9	15; 5
9	(United States) (Jamaica)	Joey Alston / Michael Hartgrove; Nigel Casserley / Keith Palmer	15; 2	15; 1

=== Final ===
United States
2
Victoria, Canada
13–14 March 1964

Japan
7

			1	2	3
1	(United States) (Japan)	Jim Poole; Yoshio Komiya	15; 11	18; 13
2	(United States) (Japan)	Manuel Armendariz; Takeshi Miyanaga	2; 15	2; 15
3	(United States) (Japan)	Michael Hartgrove / Donald C. Paup; Eiichi Nagai / Eiichi Sakai	13; 15	15; 8	9; 15
4	(United States) (Japan)	Joey Alston / Wynn Rogers; Yoshinori Itagaki / Yoshio Komiya	7; 15	7; 15
5	(United States) (Japan)	Manuel Armendariz; Yoshio Komiya	5; 15	4; 15
6	(United States) (Japan)	Jim Poole; Takeshi Miyanaga	15; 5	15; 5
7	(United States) (Japan)	Donald C. Paup; Eiichi Nagai	1; 15	14; 18
8	(United States) (Japan)	Joey Alston / Wynn Rogers; Eiichi Nagai / Eiichi Sakai	15; 8	15; 15	16; 18
9	(United States) (Japan)	Michael Hartgrove / Donald C. Paup; Yoshinori Itagaki / Yoshio Komiya	7; 15	15; 10	9; 15

== European Zone ==
=== Bracket ===
First round
Denmark
Bye
Bye
Bye
Bye
Bye
Bye
Bye
Ireland
Bye
Bye
Bye
Belgium
Bye
West Germany
Bye
Scotland
Bye
Sweden
Bye
Norway
Bye
16 November 1963 – Valletta
Pakistan
Malta	w/o
Bye
Bye
Bye
Bye
Bye
Bye
Bye
England

Second round
Denmark
Bye
Bye
Bye
16 November 1963 – Haarlem
Ireland	8
Netherlands	1
7 December 1963 – Euskirchen
Belgium	0
West Germany	9
4 December 1963 – Edinburgh
Scotland	4
Sweden	5
November 1963 – Oslo
Norway	w/o
Malta
Bye
Bye
Bye
England

Third round
Denmark
Bye
24 January 1964 – Belfast
Ireland	5
West Germany	4
13 January 1964 – Halmstad
Sweden	9
Norway	0
Bye
England

Semi-finals
26 February 1964 – Dublin
Denmark	9
Ireland	0
19 February 1964 – Rotherham
Sweden	4
England	5

Final
21 March 1964 – Copenhagen
Denmark	8
England	1

=== First round ===
The first round match between Pakistan and Malta was scheduled to be held on 16 and 17 November 1963 in Valletta. The match was later cancelled as Pakistan decided to pull out of the competition.

=== Second round ===
Sweden
5
Edinburgh, Scotland
4–5 December 1963

Scotland
4

			1	2	3
1	(Sweden) (Scotland)	Berndt Dahlberg; Robert S. McCoig	4; 15	6; 15
2	(Sweden) (Scotland)	Göran Wahlqvist; John Barrie	15; 5	15; 6
3	(Sweden) (Scotland)	Berndt Dahlberg / Bertil Glans; Robert S. McCoig / W. Frank Shannon	9; 15	16; 17
4	(Sweden) (Scotland)	Bengt-Åke Jönsson / Göran Wahlqvist; Neil Gilchrist / Mac Henderson	6; 15	15; 5	11; 15
5	(Sweden) (Scotland)	Göran Wahlqvist; Robert S. McCoig	15; 10	14; 15	2; 15
6	(Sweden) (Scotland)	Berndt Dahlberg; John Barrie	15; 0	15; 5
7	(Sweden) (Scotland)	Sture Johnsson; W. Frank Shannon	15; 6	15; 4
8	(Sweden) (Scotland)	Berndt Dahlberg / Bertil Glans; Neil Gilchrist / Mac Henderson	18; 8	17; 12
9	(Sweden) (Scotland)	Bengt-Åke Jönsson / Göran Wahlqvist; Robert S. McCoig / W. Frank Shannon	15; 10	15; 18	15; 12

Ireland
8
Haarlem, Netherlands
16 November 1963

Netherlands
1

			1	2	3
1	(Republic of Ireland) (Netherlands)	Robert Harris; Henk Weys	14; 17	15; 9	15; 7
2	(Republic of Ireland) (Netherlands)	David McCullough; Cees Broedelet	11; 15	15; 8	15; 9
3	(Republic of Ireland) (Netherlands)	Samuel Blair / Kenneth Carlisle; Boudewijn Ridder / Ronny van Wijk	15; 1	15; 5
4	(Republic of Ireland) (Netherlands)	James Doyle / Winston Wilkinson; Rommert Delsing / Henk Weys	15; 3	15; 2
5	(Republic of Ireland) (Netherlands)	David McCullough; Henk Weys	15; 10	7; 15	8; 15
6	(Republic of Ireland) (Netherlands)	Robert Harris; Cees Broedelet	15; 8	15; 10
7	(Republic of Ireland) (Netherlands)	James Doyle; Herman van Hemmert-Starkenburg	15; 3	15; 3
8	(Republic of Ireland) (Netherlands)	Samuel Blair / Kenneth Carlisle; Rommert Delsing / Henk Weys	15; 4	15; 6
9	(Republic of Ireland) (Netherlands)	James Doyle / Winston Wilkinson; Boudewijn Ridder / Ronny van Wijk	15; 4	15; 0

West Germany
9
Euskirchen, West Germany
7–8 November 1963

Belgium
0

			1	2	3
1	(West Germany) (Belgium)	Friedhelm Wulff; Anton Verstoep	15; 10	15; 3
2	(West Germany) (Belgium)	Franz Beinvogl; Roger van Meerbeek	15; 7	15; 6
3	(West Germany) (Belgium)	Peter Birtel / Friedhelm Wulff; Roger van Meerbeek / Herman Moens	15; 7	15; 12
4	(West Germany) (Belgium)	Franz Beinvogl / Kurt Jendroska; Bella Rudas / Jack Stuart	15; 4	15; 6
5	(West Germany) (Belgium)	Franz Beinvogl; Anton Verstoep	15; 3	15; 1
6	(West Germany) (Belgium)	Friedhelm Wulff; Roger van Meerbeek	18; 13	15; 5
7	(West Germany) (Belgium)	Kurt Jendroska; Herman Moens	15; 2	15; 1
8	(West Germany) (Belgium)	Peter Birtel / Friedhelm Wulff; Bella Rudas / Jack Stuart	15; 2	15; 3
9	(West Germany) (Belgium)	Franz Beinvogl / Kurt Jendroska; Roger van Meerbeek / Herman Moens	15; 10	17; 14

=== Third round ===
Sweden
9
Halmstad, Sweden
13 January 1964

Norway
0

			1	2	3
1	(Sweden) (Norway)	Göran Wahlqvist; Hans Sperre	15; 4	15; 5
2	(Sweden) (Norway)	Berndt Dahlberg; Harald Nettli	15; 4	10; 15	15; 2
3	(Sweden) (Norway)	Bengt-Åke Jönsson / Göran Wahlqvist; Per Corneliussen / Kåre Samuelsen	15; 2	15; 5
4	(Sweden) (Norway)	Berndt Dahlberg / Bertil Glans; Harald Nettli / Hans Sperre	15; 6	15; 9
5	(Sweden) (Norway)	Berndt Dahlberg; Hans Sperre	15; 11	15; 9
6	(Sweden) (Norway)	Göran Wahlqvist; Harald Nettli	15; 8	15; 6
7	(Sweden) (Norway)	Sture Johnsson; Kåre Samuelsen	15; 12	15; 9
8	(Sweden) (Norway)	Bengt-Åke Jönsson / Göran Wahlqvist; Per Corneliussen / Kåre Samuelsen	18; 3	17; 7
9	(Sweden) (Norway)	Berndt Dahlberg / Bertil Glans; Harald Nettli / Hans Sperre	15; 6	15; 9

Ireland
5
Belfast, Northern Ireland
24–25 January 1964

West Germany
4

			1	2	3
1	(Republic of Ireland) (West Germany)	Robert Harris; Friedhelm Wulff	15; 12	3; 15	9; 15
2	(Republic of Ireland) (West Germany)	James Doyle; Franz Beinvogl	10; 15	15; 7	2; 15
3	(Republic of Ireland) (West Germany)	Samuel Blair / Kenneth Carlisle; Peter Birtel / Friedhelm Wulff	15; 4	15; 5
4	(Republic of Ireland) (West Germany)	Noel Henderson / Winston Wilkinson; Franz Beinvogl / Kurt Jendroska	15; 6	15; 9
5	(Republic of Ireland) (West Germany)	James Doyle; Friedhelm Wulff	14; 17	8; 15
6	(Republic of Ireland) (West Germany)	Robert Harris; Franz Beinvogl	10; 15	6; 15
7	(Republic of Ireland) (West Germany)	Winston Wilkinson; Kurt Jendroska	10; 15	15; 12	18; 16
8	(Republic of Ireland) (West Germany)	Samuel Blair / Kenneth Carlisle; Franz Beinvogl / Kurt Jendroska	15; 12	15; 3
9	(Republic of Ireland) (West Germany)	James Doyle / Winston Wilkinson; Peter Birtel / Friedhelm Wulff	15; 2	15; 11

=== Semi-finals ===
England
5
Rotherham, England
19–20 February 1964

Sweden
4

			1	2	3
1	(England) (Sweden)	Hugh Findlay; Berndt Dahlberg	11; 15	9; 15
2	(England) (Sweden)	Colin Beacom; Göran Wahlqvist	8; 5			retired
3	(England) (Sweden)	Hugh Findlay / Anthony Jordan; Berndt Dahlberg / Bertil Glans	15; 10	18; 14
4	(England) (Sweden)	Bill Havers / John Havers; Bengt-Åke Jönsson / Willy Lund	15; 6	6; 15	15; 5
5	(England) (Sweden)	Colin Beacom; Berndt Dahlberg	12; 15	16; 17
6	(England) (Sweden)	Hugh Findlay; Bertil Glans	8; 15	5; 15
7	(England) (Sweden)	Roger Mills; Sture Johnsson	15; 7	15; 9
8	(England) (Sweden)	Hugh Findlay / Anthony Jordan; Bengt-Åke Jönsson / Willy Lund	8; 15	15; 4	15; 6
9	(England) (Sweden)	Bill Havers / John Havers; Berndt Dahlberg / Bertil Glans	11; 15	8; 15

Denmark
9
Dublin, Ireland
26–27 February 1964

Ireland
0

			1	2	3
1	(Denmark) (Republic of Ireland)	Erland Kops; Robert Harris	15; 5	15; 0
2	(Denmark) (Republic of Ireland)	Knud Aage Nielsen; James Doyle	15; 2	15; 0
3	(Denmark) (Republic of Ireland)	Jørgen Hansen / Finn Kobberø; Samuel Blair / Kenneth Carlisle	15; 7	15; 10
4	(Denmark) (Republic of Ireland)	Erland Kops / Poul-Erik Nielsen; Noel Henderson / Winston Wilkinson	15; 10	15; 9
5	(Denmark) (Republic of Ireland)	Knud Aage Nielsen; Robert Harris	15; 3	15; 10
6	(Denmark) (Republic of Ireland)	Erland Kops; James Doyle	15; 0	15; 4
7	(Denmark) (Republic of Ireland)	Henning Borch; Winston Wilkinson	15; 3	15; 2
8	(Denmark) (Republic of Ireland)	Jørgen Hansen / Finn Kobberø; Noel Henderson / Winston Wilkinson	15; 2	15; 4
9	(Denmark) (Republic of Ireland)	Erland Kops / Poul-Erik Nielsen; Samuel Blair / Kenneth Carlisle	18; 16	15; 1

=== Final ===
Denmark
8
Copenhagen, Denmark
21–22 March 1964

England
1

			1	2	3
1	(Denmark) (England)	Erland Kops; Colin Beacom	15; 12	15; 3
2	(Denmark) (England)	Knud Aage Nielsen; Roger Mills	15; 4	15; 7
3	(Denmark) (England)	Erland Kops / Poul-Erik Nielsen; Hugh Findlay / Anthony Jordan	15; 7	15; 2
4	(Denmark) (England)	Henning Borch / Jørgen Hansen; Bill Havers / John Havers	15; 4	15; 4
5	(Denmark) (England)	Knud Aage Nielsen; Colin Beacom	15; 2	11; 15	15; 6
6	(Denmark) (England)	Erland Kops; Roger Mills	15; 9	15; 4
7	(Denmark) (England)	Henning Borch; Bill Havers	15; 2	10; 1	17
8	(Denmark) (England)	Erland Kops / Poul-Erik Nielsen; Bill Havers / John Havers	15; 0	15; 9
9	(Denmark) (England)	Henning Borch / Jørgen Hansen; Hugh Findlay / Anthony Jordan	15; 12	7; 15	11; 15

== Australasian Zone ==
=== Bracket ===
First round
Malaya
Bye
6 September 1963 – Invercargill
India	7
South Africa	2
New Zealand
Bye
Bye
Australia

Semi-finals
13 September 1963 – Wellington
Malaya	8
India	1
29 July 1963 – Auckland
New Zealand	4
Australia	5

Final
21 September 1963 – Perth
Malaya	9
Australia	0

=== First round ===
India
7
Invercargill, New Zealand
6–7 September 1963

South Africa
2

			1	2	3
1	(India) (South Africa)	Trilok Nath Seth; Alan Parsons	17; 15	10; 15	15; 18
2	(India) (South Africa)	Dinesh Khanna; David Powell	15; 1	15; 4
3	(India) (South Africa)	Chandrakant Deoras / Nandu Natekar; Roy Farrell / William Kerr	15; 0	15; 10
4	(India) (South Africa)	Dipu Ghosh / Raman Ghosh; Alan Parsons / David Powell	11; 15	12; 15
5	(India) (South Africa)	Dinesh Khanna; Alan Parsons	13; 15	15; 6	15; 9
6	(India) (South Africa)	Trilok Nath Seth; David Powell	15; 7	15; 5
7	(India) (South Africa)	Dipu Ghosh; William Kerr	15; 9	15; 12
8	(India) (South Africa)	Chandrakant Deoras / Nandu Natekar; Alan Parsons / David Powell	10; 15	15; 3	15; 10
9	(India) (South Africa)	Dipu Ghosh / Raman Ghosh; Roy Farrell / William Kerr	15; 8	15; 10

=== Semi-finals ===
Malaya
8
Wellington, New Zealand
13–14 September 1963

India
1

			1	2	3
1	(Malaysia) (India)	Teh Kew San; Dinesh Khanna	15; 9	15; 0
2	(Malaysia) (India)	Yew Cheng Hoe; Nandu Natekar	10; 15	15; 3	3; 15
3	(Malaysia) (India)	Ng Boon Bee / Tan Yee Khan; Dipu Ghosh / Raman Ghosh	17; 16	15; 3
4	(Malaysia) (India)	Teh Kew San / George Yap; Chandrakant Deoras / Nandu Natekar	15; 6	15; 7
5	(Malaysia) (India)	Yew Cheng Hoe; Dinesh Khanna	15; 2	15; 11
6	(Malaysia) (India)	Teh Kew San; Nandu Natekar	15; 5	15; 7
7	(Malaysia) (India)	Wee Choon Seng; Trilok Nath Seth	15; 8	15; 4
8	(Malaysia) (India)	Ng Boon Bee / Tan Yee Khan; Chandrakant Deoras / Nandu Natekar	15; 7	15; 10
9	(Malaysia) (India)	Wee Choon Seng / George Yap; Dipu Ghosh / Raman Ghosh	15; 5	15; 8

Australia
5
Auckland, New Zealand
29–30 July 1963

New Zealand
4

			1	2	3
1	(Australia) (New Zealand)	Ken Turner; Jeff Robson	9; 15	15; 9	15; 8
2	(Australia) (New Zealand)	George Robotham; Richard Purser	15; 12	14; 17	5; 15
3	(Australia) (New Zealand)	Edward Anderson / George Robotham; Richard Purser / Jeff Robson	8; 15	15; 18
4	(Australia) (New Zealand)	Graham Nelson / Ken Turner; Don Higgins / Kevin Long	15; 5	15; 10
5	(Australia) (New Zealand)	George Robotham; Jeff Robson	15; 3	15; 8
6	(Australia) (New Zealand)	Ken Turner; Richard Purser	15; 12	15; 13
7	(Australia) (New Zealand)	Ron Young; Don Higgins	15; 3	10; 15	3; 15
8	(Australia) (New Zealand)	Edward Anderson / George Robotham; Don Higgins / Kevin Long	15; 6	10; 17	11
9	(Australia) (New Zealand)	Graham Nelson / Ken Turner; Richard Purser / Jeff Robson	11; 15	4; 15

=== Final ===
Malaya
9
Perth, Australia
21–22 September 1963

Australia
0

			1	2	3
1	(Malaysia) (Australia)	Yew Cheng Hoe; Ken Turner	15; 8	17; 14
2	(Malaysia) (Australia)	Teh Kew San; Ron Young	15; 3	15; 6
3	(Malaysia) (Australia)	Ng Boon Bee / Tan Yee Khan; George Robotham / Ken Turner	17; 8	15; 3
4	(Malaysia) (Australia)	Teh Kew San / George Yap; Edward Ireland / Graham Nelson	15; 1	15; 2
5	(Malaysia) (Australia)	Teh Kew San; Ken Turner	15; 6	15; 7
6	(Malaysia) (Australia)	Yew Cheng Hoe; Ron Young	15; 5	15; 2
7	(Malaysia) (Australia)	Wee Choon Seng; George Robotham	15; 6	12; 15	15; 1
8	(Malaysia) (Australia)	Ng Boon Bee / Tan Yee Khan; Edward Ireland / Graham Nelson	15; 1	15; 3
9	(Malaysia) (Australia)	Wee Choon Seng / George Yap; George Robotham / Ken Turner	12; 15	15; 8	15; 7
