= 1961 Thomas Cup knockout stage =

Badminton tournament

The knockout stage for the 1961 Thomas Cup began on 1 June 1961 with the first-round knockout and ended on 11 June with the final tie.

== Qualified teams ==
The teams that won their zonal tie qualified for the final knockout stage.

Group	Winners
CH	Indonesia
AS	Thailand
AM	United States
AU	Australia
EU	Denmark

== Bracket ==
First round
Indonesia
Bye
1 June 1958 – Jakarta
Australia	0
Thailand	9
3 June 1958 – Jakarta
United States	2
Denmark	7

Second round
Indonesia
Bye
6 June 1961 – Jakarta
Thailand	7
Denmark	2

Challenge round
10 June 1961 – Jakarta
Indonesia	6
Thailand	3

== First round ==
The inter-zone playoffs in Jakarta began on the first two days of June with Thailand beating Australia without the loss of a match or a game. Denmark then defeated the USA 7–2, but even in victory Danish problems with the heat and humidity were evident as players hailed by some as the best in the world often struggled against less talented opponents who, as Californians, were more accustomed to hot gymnasiums.

=== Thailand vs Australia ===
Thailand
9
Istora Gelora Bung Karno
1–2 June 1961

Australia
0

			1	2	3
1	(Thailand) (Australia)	Channarong Ratanaseangsuang; Ken Turner	15; 5	15; 1
2	(Thailand) (Australia)	Somsook Boonyasukhanonda; Don Murray	15; 3	15; 9
3	(Thailand) (Australia)	Chavalert Chumkum / Chuchart Vatanatham; Ted Anderson / George Robotham	15; 10	17; 6
4	(Thailand) (Australia)	Narong Bhornchima / Raphi Kanchanaraphi; Don Murray / Ken Turner	15; 6	15; 5
5	(Thailand) (Australia)	Somsook Boonyasukhanonda; Ken Turner	15; 6	15; 5
6	(Thailand) (Australia)	Channarong Ratanaseangsuang; Don Murray	15; 1	15; 2
7	(Thailand) (Australia)	Narong Bhornchima; Ron Young	15; 2	15; 3
8	(Thailand) (Australia)	Chavalert Chumkum / Chuchart Vatanatham; Don Murray / Ken Turner	15; 3	15; 7
9	(Thailand) (Australia)	Narong Bhornchima / Raphi Kanchanaraphi; Ted Anderson / George Robotham	15; 8	15; 12

=== Denmark vs United States ===
Denmark
7
Istora Gelora Bung Karno
3–4 June 1961

United States
2

			1	2	3
1	(Denmark) (United States)	Erland Kops; Jim Poole	15; 10	4; 15	18; 14
2	(Denmark) (United States)	Finn Kobberø; Bill Berry	15; 10	12; 15	15; 10
3	(Denmark) (United States)	Erland Kops / Henning Borch; Joey Alston / Ron Palmer	15; 10	17; 16
4	(Denmark) (United States)	Jørgen Hansen / Finn Kobberø; Michael Hartgrove / Wynn Rogers	15; 4	15; 8
5	(Denmark) (United States)	Finn Kobberø; Jim Poole	15; 6	15; 3
6	(Denmark) (United States)	Erland Kops; Bill Berry	15; 11	15; 0
7	(Denmark) (United States)	Knud Aage Nielsen; Ron Palmer	15; 6	6; 15	4; 15
8	(Denmark) (United States)	Jørgen Hansen / Finn Kobberø; Joey Alston / Ron Palmer	15; 2	15; 6
9	(Denmark) (United States)	Erland Kops / Henning Borch; Michael Hartgrove / Wynn Rogers	15; 9	12; 15	14; 17

== Second round ==
=== Denmark vs Thailand ===
The Danes' contest against Thailand fully demonstrated this weakness. A team entirely composed of either past, present, or future All-England champions was decisively beaten by a team composed of players who would never win that individual honor. Erland Kops and Finn Kobbero defeated the Thai number two Somsook Boonyasukhanonda comfortably, but both were beaten by young Channarong Ratanaseangsuang. Most shockingly, the famous doubles team of Kobbero and Hammergaard Hansen was beaten by both Thai pairs who swept all four doubles matches. Thus Thailand completed its run to the challenge round with an impressive 7–2 victory over Denmark.

Denmark
2
Istora Gelora Bung Karno
6–7 June 1961

Thailand
7

			1	2	3
1	(Denmark) (Thailand)	Finn Kobberø; Channarong Ratanaseangsuang	15; 17	13; 15
2	(Denmark) (Thailand)	Erland Kops; Somsook Boonyasukhanonda	15; 8	15; 8
3	(Denmark) (Thailand)	Jørgen Hansen / Finn Kobberø; Narong Bhornchima / Raphi Kanchanaraphi	13; 15	11; 15
4	(Denmark) (Thailand)	Erland Kops / Henning Borch; Chavalert Chumkum / Chulart Vatanatham	10; 15	16; 17
5	(Denmark) (Thailand)	Knud Aage Nielsen; Narong Bhornchima	9; 15	11; 15
6	(Denmark) (Thailand)	Finn Kobberø; Somsook Boonyasukhanonda	15; 1	15; 2
7	(Denmark) (Thailand)	Erland Kops; Channarong Ratanaseangsuang	1; 15	11; 15
8	(Denmark) (Thailand)	Jørgen Hansen / Finn Kobberø; Chavalert Chumkum / Chulart Vatanatham	4; 15	15; 13	10; 15
9	(Denmark) (Thailand)	Erland Kops / Henning Borch; Narong Bhornchima / Raphi Kanchanaraphi	15; 5	11; 15	10; 15

== Challenge round ==
=== Indonesia vs Thailand ===
The task of beating a strong Indonesian team in Jakarta's Senayan Stadium was possibly rendered even more difficult for Thailand when "neutral" officials and linesmen failed to arrive from Malaya. As they had done three years earlier in Singapore, the Indonesians swept all five singles matches. Ratanaseangsuang was unable to produce the consistency he had displayed against Kops and Kobbero and lost tamely to Indonesia's Tan Joe Hok and Ferry Sonneville. Boonyasukhanonda was simply not in the class of the two Indonesians, whose careers would be hallmarked by their Thomas Cup brilliance. The Thai doubles pairs played quite well, particularly the team of Narong Bhornchima and Raphi Kanchanaraphi who won both of their matches. Doubles victories were not enough, however, as Indonesia retained the Cup 6–3.

Indonesia
6
Istora Gelora Bung Karno
10–11 June 1961

Thailand
3

			1	2	3
1	(Indonesia) (Thailand)	Tan Joe Hok; Channarong Ratanaseangsuang	15; 9	15; 5
2	(Indonesia) (Thailand)	Ferry Sonneville; Somsook Boonyasukhanonda	15; 3	15; 11
3	(Indonesia) (Thailand)	Tan Joe Hok / Lie Poo Djian; Narong Bhornchima / Raphi Kanchanaraphi	7; 15	13; 15
4	(Indonesia) (Thailand)	Tan King Gwan / Njoo Kiem Bie; Chavalert Chumkum / Chulart Vatanatham	15; 12	14; 17		retired
5	(Indonesia) (Thailand)	Eddy Yusuf; Narong Bhornchima	18; 14	15; 7
6	(Indonesia) (Thailand)	Tan Joe Hok; Somsook Boonyasukhanonda	15; 2	15; 5
7	(Indonesia) (Thailand)	Ferry Sonneville; Channarong Ratanaseangsuang	15; 9	15; 4
8	(Indonesia) (Thailand)	Tan Joe Hok / Lie Poo Djian; Chavalert Chumkum / Chulart Vatanatham	15; 5	13; 15	18; 17
9	(Indonesia) (Thailand)	Tan King Gwan / Ferry Sonneville; Narong Bhornchima / Raphi Kanchanaraphi	13; 15	15; 13	5; 15
