= Patricia Page =

English badminton player

Personal information
- Nationality: British (English)
- Citizenship: British (English)
- Born: 1934 (age 90–91)

Sport
- Country: England
- Sport: Badminton

Patricia A. Havers (nee Page; born 1939) is an English former badminton international player and former Scottish Open doubles champion.

== Biography ==
Page won the 1964 Scottish Open mixed doubles title with Tony Jordan and was the 1967 mixed doubles runner-up with her brother-in-law John Havers in the English National Badminton Championships.

In 1965 she married Bill Havers the 1964 English national champion.
