= 1961 Thomas Cup qualification =

Tournament details
- Dates: 22 July 1960 – 29 March 1961
- Location: Asian zone: Bangkok; Hong Kong; Lahore American zone: Toronto; European zone: Greenock; Derry; Paris; Southend-on-Sea; Stockholm; Trollhättan Australasian zone: Feilding; Melbourne

The qualifying process for the 1961 Thomas Cup took place from 22 July 1960 to 29 March 1961 to decide the final teams which will play in the final tournament.

== Qualification process ==
The qualification process is divided into four regions, the Asian Zone, the American Zone, the European Zone and the Australasian Zone. Teams in their respective zone will compete in a knockout format. Teams will compete for two days, with two singles and doubles played on the first day and three singles and two doubles played on the next day. The teams that win their respective zone will earn a place in the final tournament to be held in Jakarta.

Indonesia were the champions of the last Thomas Cup, therefore the team automatically qualified for the inter-zone play-offs.

=== Qualified teams ===
Country	Qualified as	Qualified on	Final appearance
Indonesia	1958 Thomas Cup winners	15 June 1958	2nd
Thailand	Asian Zone winners	29 March 1961	2nd
Denmark	European Zone winners	13 March 1961	5th
United States	American Zone winners	25 February 1961	5th
Australia	Australasian Zone winners	21 January 1961	2nd

== Asian Zone ==
=== Bracket ===
First round
Hong Kong
Bye
30 July 1960 – Lahore
Pakistan	9
Ceylon	0
19 December 1960 – Bangkok
India	3
Thailand	6
Bye
Malaya

Semi-finals
January 1961 – Hong Kong
Hong Kong
Pakistan	w/o
23 December 1960 – Bangkok
Thailand	7
Malaya	2

Final
28 March 1961 – Lahore
Pakistan	1
Thailand	8

=== First round ===
Thailand
6
Bangkok, Thailand
19–20 December 1960

India
3

			1	2	3
1	(Thailand) (India)	Channarong Ratanaseangsuang; Suresh Goel	15; 10	15; 1
2	(Thailand) (India)	Somsook Boonyasukhanonda; Nandu Natekar	8; 15	5; 15
3	(Thailand) (India)	Narong Bhornchima / Raphi Kanchanaraphi; Chandrakant Deoras / Nandu Natekar	6; 15	9; 15
4	(Thailand) (India)	Chavalert Chumkum / Chuchart Vatanatham; Amrit Lal Dewan / Dipu Ghosh	15; 5	17; 14
5	(Thailand) (India)	Somsook Boonyasukhanonda; Suresh Goel	15; 13	15; 11
6	(Thailand) (India)	Channarong Ratanaseangsuang; Nandu Natekar	10; 15	9; 15
7	(Thailand) (India)	Narong Bhornchima; Amrit Lal Dewan	15; 7	15; 11
8	(Thailand) (India)	Chavalert Chumkum / Chuchart Vatanatham; Chandrakant Deoras / Nandu Natekar	15; 7	15; 9
9	(Thailand) (India)	Narong Bhornchima / Raphi Kanchanaraphi; Amrit Lal Dewan / Dipu Ghosh	15; 8	15; 4

Pakistan
9
Lahore, Pakistan
30–31 July 1960

Ceylon
0

			1	2	3
1	(Pakistan) (Dominion of Ceylon)	Shamshad Ali; Nagalingam Rasalingam	15; 3	15; 3
2	(Pakistan) (Dominion of Ceylon)	Akram Baig; Sam Chandrasena	15; 4	15; 6
3	(Pakistan) (Dominion of Ceylon)	Tahir Karamat / Naqi Mohsin; Sam Chandrasena / A. R. L. Wijesekera	15; 7	15; 5
4	(Pakistan) (Dominion of Ceylon)	Wajahat Ali / Masood Khan; Gerry Chandrasena / Nagalingam Rasalingam	15; 3	15; 2
5	(Pakistan) (Dominion of Ceylon)	Akram Baig; Nagalingam Rasalingam	15; 10	15; 3
6	(Pakistan) (Dominion of Ceylon)	Shamshad Ali; Sam Chandrasena	15; 11	15; 8
7	(Pakistan) (Dominion of Ceylon)	Tahir Karamat; V. Sriskandarajah	6; 15	15; 3	15; 9
8	(Pakistan) (Dominion of Ceylon)	Wajahat Ali / Masood Khan; Sam Chandrasena / A. R. L. Wijesekera	15; 6	15; 5
9	(Pakistan) (Dominion of Ceylon)	Tahir Karamat / Naqi Mohsin; Gerry Chandrasena / Nagalingam Rasalingam	15; 12	15; 10

=== Semi-finals ===
Malaya
2
Bangkok, Thailand
23–24 December 1960

Thailand
7

			1	2	3
1	(Malaysia) (Thailand)	Teh Kew San; Narong Bhornchima	17; 14	15; 12
2	(Malaysia) (Thailand)	Eddy Choong; Somsook Boonyasukhanonda	12; 15	9; 15
3	(Malaysia) (Thailand)	Lim Say Hup / Teh Kew San; Narong Bhornchima / Raphi Kanchanaraphi	2; 15	10; 15
4	(Malaysia) (Thailand)	Ng Boon Bee / Tan Yee Khan; Chavalert Chumkum / Chuchart Vatanatham	12; 15	15; 4	14; 18
5	(Malaysia) (Thailand)	Eddy Choong; Somsook Boonyasukhanonda	1; 15	7; 15
6	(Malaysia) (Thailand)	Teh Kew San; Narong Bhornchima	9; 15	8; 15
7	(Malaysia) (Thailand)	Tan Yee Khan; Channarong Ratanaseangsuang	18; 17	8; 15	8; 15
8	(Malaysia) (Thailand)	Lim Say Hup / Teh Kew San; Chavalert Chumkum / Chuchart Vatanatham	15; 9	15; 8
9	(Malaysia) (Thailand)	Ng Boon Bee / Tan Yee Khan; Narong Bhornchima / Raphi Kanchanaraphi	9; 15	15; 10	7; 15

=== Final ===
Thailand
8
Lahore, Pakistan
28–29 March 1961

Pakistan
1

			1	2	3
1	(Thailand) (Pakistan)	Somsook Boonyasukhanonda; Nazir Rajput	15; 5	15; 13
2	(Thailand) (Pakistan)	Channarong Ratanaseangsuang; Masood Khan	15; 6	15; 11
3	(Thailand) (Pakistan)	Narong Bhornchima / Raphi Kanchanaraphi; Naqi Mohsin / Nazir Rajput	15; 8	15; 2
4	(Thailand) (Pakistan)	Chavalert Chumkum / Chuchart Vatanatham; Wajahat Ali / Masood Khan	15; 8	15; 9
5	(Thailand) (Pakistan)	Channarong Ratanaseangsuang; Nazir Rajput	15; 4	15; 1
6	(Thailand) (Pakistan)	Somsook Boonyasukhanonda; Masood Khan	10; 15	14; 18
7	(Thailand) (Pakistan)	Narong Bhornchima; Naqi Mohsin	15; 7	15; 9
8	(Thailand) (Pakistan)	Chavalert Chumkum / Chuchart Vatanatham; Naqi Mohsin / Nazir Rajput	15; 11	15; 3
9	(Thailand) (Pakistan)	Narong Bhornchima / Raphi Kanchanaraphi; Wajahat Ali / Masood Khan	15; 3	15; 3

== American Zone ==
=== Bracket ===
Final
24 February 1961 – Toronto
United States	7
Canada	2

=== Final ===
United States
7
Toronto, Canada
24–25 February 1961

Canada
2

			1	2	3
1	(United States) (Canada)	Jim Poole; James Carnwath	15; 10	15; 0
2	(United States) (Canada)	Bill Berry; Wayne Macdonnell	12; 15	15; 10	15; 4
3	(United States) (Canada)	Joey Alston / Wynn Rogers; Bert Fergus / Beverley Westcott	15; 4	15; 1
4	(United States) (Canada)	Manuel Armendariz / Jim Poole; Herbert Kirkconnell / John Martin	15; 1	15; 11
5	(United States) (Canada)	Bill Berry; James Carnwath	15; 7	15; 7
6	(United States) (Canada)	Jim Poole; Beverley Westcott	15; 4	15; 3
7	(United States) (Canada)	Manuel Armendariz; Bert Fergus	7; 15	17; 16	2; 15
8	(United States) (Canada)	Joey Alston / Wynn Rogers; Herbert Kirkconnell / John Martin	15; 0	15; 8
9	(United States) (Canada)	Manuel Armendariz / Jim Poole; Bert Fergus / Beverley Westcott	8; 15	15; 12	7; 15

== European Zone ==
=== Bracket ===
First round
14 November 1960 – Paris
England	9
France	0
3 December 1960 – Trollhättan
Sweden	9
Norway	0
16 December 1960 – Derry
Denmark	9
Ireland	0
Bye
Scotland

Semi-finals
11 January 1961 – Stockholm
England	5
Sweden	4
19 December 1960 – Greenock
Denmark	8
Scotland	1

Final
12 March 1961 – Southend-on-Sea
England	0
Denmark	9

=== First round ===
England
9
Paris, France
14 November 1960

France
0

			1	2	3
1	(England) (France)	Trevor Coates; Alain Groéné	15; 2	15; 5
2	(England) (France)	Peter Waddell; Christian Badou	15; 1	15; 1
3	(England) (France)	Hugh Findlay / Ron Lockwood; Maurice Mathieu / Henri Pellizza	15; 6	15; 1
4	(England) (France)	Trevor Coates / Anthony Jordan; Paul Ailloud / Christian Badou	15; 7	15; 7
5	(England) (France)	Peter Waddell; Alain Groéné	15; 4	15; 5
6	(England) (France)	Trevor Coates; Christian Badou	15; 3	15; 8
7	(England) (France)	Hugh Findlay; Paul Ailloud	15; 3	15; 6
8	(England) (France)	Trevor Coates / Anthony Jordan; Maurice Mathieu / Henri Pellizza	15; 7	15; 4
9	(England) (France)	Hugh Findlay / Ron Lockwood; Paul Ailloud / Christian Badou	15; 4	15; 6

Sweden
9
Trollhättan, Sweden
3–4 December 1960

Norway
0

			1	2	3
1	(Sweden) (Norway)	Bertil Glans; Harald Nettli	15; 3	15; 2
2	(Sweden) (Norway)	Ingemar Eliasson; Per Corneliussen	15; 4	15; 3
3	(Sweden) (Norway)	Bengt-Åke Jönsson / Göran Wahlqvist; Erik Kjølberg / Arne Hagene	15; 5	15; 3
4	(Sweden) (Norway)	Bertil Glans / Ingemar Eliasson; Per Corneliussen / Harald Nettli	15; 6	15; 2
5	(Sweden) (Norway)	Ingemar Eliasson; Harald Nettli	15; 11	15; 3
6	(Sweden) (Norway)	Bertil Glans; Per Corneliussen	15; 2	15; 2
7	(Sweden) (Norway)	Leif Ekedahl; Kåre Samuelsen	15; 9	15; 10
8	(Sweden) (Norway)	Bertil Glans / Ingemar Eliasson; Erik Kjølberg / Arne Hagene	18; 2	17; 5
9	(Sweden) (Norway)	Bengt-Åke Jönsson / Göran Wahlqvist; Per Corneliussen / Harald Nettli	15; 5	15; 9

Denmark
9
Derry, Northern Ireland
16–17 December 1960

Ireland
0

			1	2	3
1	(Denmark) (Republic of Ireland)	Erland Kops; James Doyle	15; 1	15; 1
2	(Denmark) (Republic of Ireland)	Finn Kobberø; Lennox Robinson	15; 1	15; 4
3	(Denmark) (Republic of Ireland)	Finn Kobberø / Arne Rasmussen; Samuel Blair / Kenneth Carlisle	15; 5	15; 9
4	(Denmark) (Republic of Ireland)	Erland Kops / Poul-Erik Nielsen; Charles McCormack / Winston Wilkinson	15; 5	15; 3
5	(Denmark) (Republic of Ireland)	Finn Kobberø; James Doyle	15; 4	15; 8
6	(Denmark) (Republic of Ireland)	Erland Kops; Lennox Robinson	15; 3	15; 0
7	(Denmark) (Republic of Ireland)	Henning Borch; Samuel Blair	15; 7	15; 2
8	(Denmark) (Republic of Ireland)	Finn Kobberø / Arne Rasmussen; Charles McCormack / Winston Wilkinson	15; 2	15; 5
9	(Denmark) (Republic of Ireland)	Erland Kops / Poul-Erik Nielsen; Samuel Blair / Kenneth Carlisle	15; 6	15; 6

=== Semi-finals ===
England
5
Stockholm, Sweden
11–12 January 1961

Sweden
4

			1	2	3
1	(England) (Sweden)	Peter Waddell; Bertil Glans	9; 15	15; 8	13; 15
2	(England) (Sweden)	Roger Mills; Ingemar Eliasson	11; 15	18; 15	15; 10
3	(England) (Sweden)	Anthony Jordan / Peter Waddell; Bengt-Åke Jönsson / Göran Wahlqvist	8; 15	15; 13	15; 10
4	(England) (Sweden)	Hugh Findlay / Ron Lockwood; Bertil Glans / Ingemar Eliasson	15; 4	18; 16
5	(England) (Sweden)	Roger Mills; Bertil Glans	3; 15	8; 15
6	(England) (Sweden)	Peter Waddell; Ingemar Eliasson	6; 15	15; 5	9; 15
7	(England) (Sweden)	Trevor Coates; Leif Ekedahl	5; 15	5; 15
8	(England) (Sweden)	Anthony Jordan / Peter Waddell; Bertil Glans / Ingemar Eliasson	15; 5	15; 12
9	(England) (Sweden)	Hugh Findlay / Ron Lockwood; Bengt-Åke Jönsson / Göran Wahlqvist	17; 15	3; 15	15; 9

Denmark
8
Greenock, Scotland
19–20 December 1960

Scotland
1

			1	2	3
1	(Denmark) (Scotland)	Erland Kops; Robert S. McCoig	15; 2	15; 3
2	(Denmark) (Scotland)	Finn Kobberø; John Barrie	15; 5	15; 4
3	(Denmark) (Scotland)	Finn Kobberø / Arne Rasmussen; Mac Henderson / Donald Ross	6; 15	15; 12	15; 13
4	(Denmark) (Scotland)	Erland Kops / Poul-Erik Nielsen; Robert S. McCoig / W. Frank Shannon	15; 6	17; 14
5	(Denmark) (Scotland)	Finn Kobberø; Robert S. McCoig	13; 18	15; 8	15; 4
6	(Denmark) (Scotland)	Erland Kops; John Barrie	15; 3	15; 4
7	(Denmark) (Scotland)	Henning Borch; W. Frank Shannon	15; 11	15; 1
8	(Denmark) (Scotland)	Finn Kobberø / Arne Rasmussen; Robert S. McCoig / W. Frank Shannon	10; 15	10; 15
9	(Denmark) (Scotland)	Erland Kops / Poul-Erik Nielsen; Mac Henderson / Donald Ross	15; 6	15; 0

=== Final ===
Denmark
9
Southend-on-Sea, England
12–13 March 1961

England
0

			1	2	3
1	(Denmark) (England)	Erland Kops; Trevor Coates	15; 9	15; 8
2	(Denmark) (England)	Finn Kobberø; Peter Waddell	15; 7	15; 10
3	(Denmark) (England)	Jørgen Hansen / Finn Kobberø; Anthony Jordan / Peter Waddell	15; 12	15; 6
4	(Denmark) (England)	Erland Kops / Poul-Erik Nielsen; Hugh Findlay / Ron Lockwood	15; 8	15; 11
5	(Denmark) (England)	Finn Kobberø; Trevor Coates	15; 9	15; 5
6	(Denmark) (England)	Erland Kops; Peter Waddell	15; 13	15; 4
7	(Denmark) (England)	Henning Borch; Hugh Findlay	15; 9	10; 15	17; 14
8	(Denmark) (England)	Jørgen Hansen / Finn Kobberø; Hugh Findlay / Ron Lockwood	12; 15	15; 7	15; 8
9	(Denmark) (England)	Erland Kops / Poul-Erik Nielsen; Anthony Jordan / Peter Waddell	15; 4	15; 1

== Australasian Zone ==
=== Bracket ===
Semi-finals
22 July 1960 – Feilding
Australia	8
New Zealand	1
Bye
Japan

Final
December 1960 – Melbourne
Australia	w/o
Japan

=== Semi-finals ===
Australia
8
Feilding, New Zealand
22–23 July 1960

New Zealand
1

			1	2	3
1	(Australia) (New Zealand)	Ken Turner; Jeff Robson	11; 15	15; 12	15; 10
2	(Australia) (New Zealand)	Stan Russell; Alban M. Stephens	15; 9	15; 6
3	(Australia) (New Zealand)	Don Murray / Ken Turner; Jeff Robson / Paul Skelt	15; 9	15; 11
4	(Australia) (New Zealand)	Ian Hutchinson / Stan Russell; Grenville Hinton / Raymond Reid	15; 8	15; 8
5	(Australia) (New Zealand)	Stan Russell; Jeff Robson	10; 15	15; 10	15; 4
6	(Australia) (New Zealand)	Ken Turner; Alban M. Stephens	15; 3	15; 6
7	(Australia) (New Zealand)	Don Murray; Don Higgins	18; 13	6; 15	15; 10
8	(Australia) (New Zealand)	Ian Hutchinson / Stan Russell; Jeff Robson / Paul Skelt	15; 10	10; 15	11; 15
9	(Australia) (New Zealand)	Don Murray / Ken Turner; Grenville Hinton / Raymond Reid	15; 11	15; 4

=== Final ===
In the final of the Australasian zone qualifiers, Japan conceded a walkover to Australia. Therefore, Australia qualified for the Thomas Cup by default.
