= 1961 Thomas Cup - American Zone =

The Thomas Cup is an international teams competition for the supremacy in men's badminton. For the Thomas Cup 1961, 18 national teams were divided in 4 groups; namely, Asia, Australasia, Europe, and America. The four zone winners would then play a second round (the Inter-zones play-offs) in Jakarta, Indonesia, for the right to face the defending champion, Indonesia, who was exempted from earlier rounds, in a conclusive challenge round. For a more detailed description of the Thomas Cup format, see Wikipedia's general article about the Thomas Cup.

As in previous years, the American zone qualifiers of the Thomas Cup of 1961 were limited to a dual meet between the United States and Canada that was won as always by the former team. These games were held at Toronto, Canada, on the 24 and 25 February 1961.

United States (United States)	Canada	Set 1	Set 2	Set 3
Jim Poole	J. Carnwath	15-10	15-0	
Jim Poole	B. Westcott	15-4	15-3	
Bill E. Berry	Wayne Macdonell	12-15	15-10	15-4
Bill E. Berry	J. Carnwath	15-7	15-7	
Manny Armendariz	Bert Fergus	7-15	17-16	2-15
JC Alston - TW Rogers	Bert Fergus - B. Westcott	15-4	15-1	
JC Alston - TW Rogers	J. Martin - H. Kirkconnell	15-8	15-4	
Jim Poole - Manny Armendariz	J. Martin - H. Kirkconnell	15-1	15-11	
Jim Poole - Manny Armendariz	Bert Fergus - B. Westcott	8-15	15-12	7-15

The United States defeated Canada 7-2. Jim Poole won his 2 singles matches in 2 sets, plus one more together with Manny Armendariz. Joseph Cameron Alston and T Wynn Rogers, won their 2 doubles matches in 2 sets as well. Bill E. Berry also won his 2 singles games. Perhaps the most outstanding Canadian figure was Bert Fergus who won his singles match against Manny Armendariz, and one men's doubles match as a couple of B. Westcott to Jim Poole and Manny Armendariz.

The United States would face—later on the Inter-zone play-offs—the powerful team of Denmark led by their badminton legends: Erland Kops and Finn Kobbero.
