= 1964 Thomas Cup =

1964 Thomas Cup トマス杯1964
Tournament details
- Dates: 14 – 22 May 1964
- Edition: 6th
- Level: International
- Nations: 5
- Venue: Tokyo Metropolitan Gymnasium
- Location: Tokyo, Japan

The 1964 Thomas Cup competition is an international team tournament for supremacy in men's badminton (its female counterpart is the Uber Cup). Beginning in 1948–49 it was held every three years until 1982 and thereafter it has been held every two years. Twenty-six national teams, each (except the defending champion nation) starting from one of four qualifying zones (Asia, Australasia, Europe, and Pan America), vied for the Thomas Cup during the 1963-1964 badminton season.

Qualifying zone winners played-off in Tokyo, Japan for the right to face defending champion Indonesia, which was exempt from earlier ties (team matches), in a conclusive challenge round tie. Prior to 1964 the defending champion nation had regularly hosted both the inter-zone playoffs and the challenge round, but a rules change effective that year prevented the same defending champion nation from having this advantage for two successive Thomas Cup seasons. For a more detailed description of the Thomas Cup format see Wikipedia's general article on the Thomas Cup.

== Qualification ==
Means of qualification	Date	Venue	Slot	Qualified teams
1961 Thomas Cup	1 – 11 June 1961	Jakarta	1	Indonesia
Asian Zone	September 1963 – 25 January 1964	Taipei	1	Thailand
American Zone	7 February – 14 March 1964	Kingston; Mexico City; Vancouver; Victoria	1	Japan
European Zone	16 November 1964 – 22 March 1964	Belfast; Copenhagen; Dublin; Edinburgh; Euskirchen; Haarlem; Halmstad; Oslo; Rotherham	1	Denmark
Australasian Zone	29 July – 21 September 1963	Auckland; Invercargill; Perth; Wellington	1	Malaysia
Total			5	

With Malaya and India competing in the Australasian zone, and Japan competing in the Pan American zone, Thailand, the 1961 Thomas Cup runner-up, won the Asian zone by shutting out Taiwan (9–0). After missing the 1960-1961 series, Charoen Wattanasin had returned to the team, while Thailand's other top singles player, Channarong Ratanaseangsuang (living in California) would rejoin the team for the inter-zone matches.

In the Australasian zone a rebuilding Malaya (soon to be Malaysia), with no hold-overs from its champion teams of the 1950s, defeated India (8–1) and Australia (9–0) to advance to the inter-zone playoffs. All-rounder Teh Kew San went eight for eight in this set of ties. Previously the domain of only the USA and Canada, the Pan American zone welcomed Jamaica, Mexico, and "outsider" Japan. The Japanese, however, proved their mettle by shutting out Mexico and by defeating Canada 8–1. In the zone final against the USA, which had won all previous Pan American zone qualifications, Japan prevailed 7–2, despite two singles victories by American stalwart Jim Poole. Playing doubles and third singles, Japan's team captain, Eiichi Nagai won all of his nine matches in this series of ties.

Denmark again won the European zone handily, brushing aside England 8–1 in the final. The Danish lineup boasted five time All-England singles champion Erland Kops (still only 27), the reigning All-England champion Knud Aage Nielsen, the All-England singles runner-up, Henning Borch, and the reigning and six time All-England doubles champions, Finn Kobbero and Jorgen Hammergaard Hansen. With the final ties scheduled for temperate Tokyo rather than equatorial and partisan Jakarta, many observers thought that this would be Denmark's "year."

== Knockout stage ==
The following teams, shown by region, qualified for the 1964 Thomas Cup. Defending champion and host Indonesia automatically qualified to defend their title.

=== Bracket ===
First round
Indonesia
Bye
14 May 1964 – Tokyo
Malaysia	2
Denmark	7
14 May 1964 – Tokyo
Japan	3
Thailand	6

Second round
Indonesia
Bye
17 May 1964 – Tokyo
Denmark	6
Thailand	3

Challenge round
21 May 1964 – Tokyo
Indonesia	5
Denmark	4

=== First round ===
14 May 1964
15 May 1964

Thailand	6–3	Japan
Report

Tokyo Metropolitan Gymnasium, Japan

14 May 1964
15 May 1964

Denmark	7–2	Malaysia
Report

Tokyo Metropolitan Gymnasium, Japan

=== Consolation playoff ===
17 May 1964
18 May 1964

Malaysia	7–2	Japan
Report

Tokyo Metropolitan Gymnasium, Japan

=== Second round ===
17 May 1964
18 May 1964

Thailand	3–6	Denmark
Report

Tokyo Metropolitan Gymnasium, Japan

=== Final ===
21 May 1964
22 May 1964

Indonesia	5–4	Denmark
Report

Tokyo Metropolitan Gymnasium, Japan

1964 Thomas Cup winner

Indonesia
Third title
