= John Havers =

English badminton player (1931–2023)

Personal information
- Nationality: British (English)
- Born: May 1931; Romford, England
- Died: 2 November 2023 (aged 92)

John Newton Havers (May 1931 – 2 November 2023) was an English badminton international player and a national doubles champion.

== Biography ==
John Newton Havers was born in Romford in May 1931. He became the English National doubles champion after winning the English National Badminton Championships in 1965 with his younger brother Bill Havers.

Havers played for Essex and England. He was also the 1964 and 1968 men's doubles runner-up with his brother and the 1967 mixed doubles runner-up with his sister-in-law Patricia Page.

John Havers died on 2 November 2023, at the age of 92.
