= Bill Havers =

English badminton player

Personal information
- Nationality: British (English)
- Born: 1936 (age 88–89); Barking, England

William F. Havers (born 1936) is an English former badminton international player and a former national champion.

== Biography ==
Havers became the English National champion after winning the inaugural English National Badminton Championships in 1964.

Havers played for Essex and England and was also the 1964 and 1968 men's doubles runner-up with his older brother John Havers and the following year the brothers won the 1965 National Championships doubles title.

In 1965 he married Patricia Page the 1965 Scottish Open champion.
