= Knud Aage Nielsen =

Danish badminton player

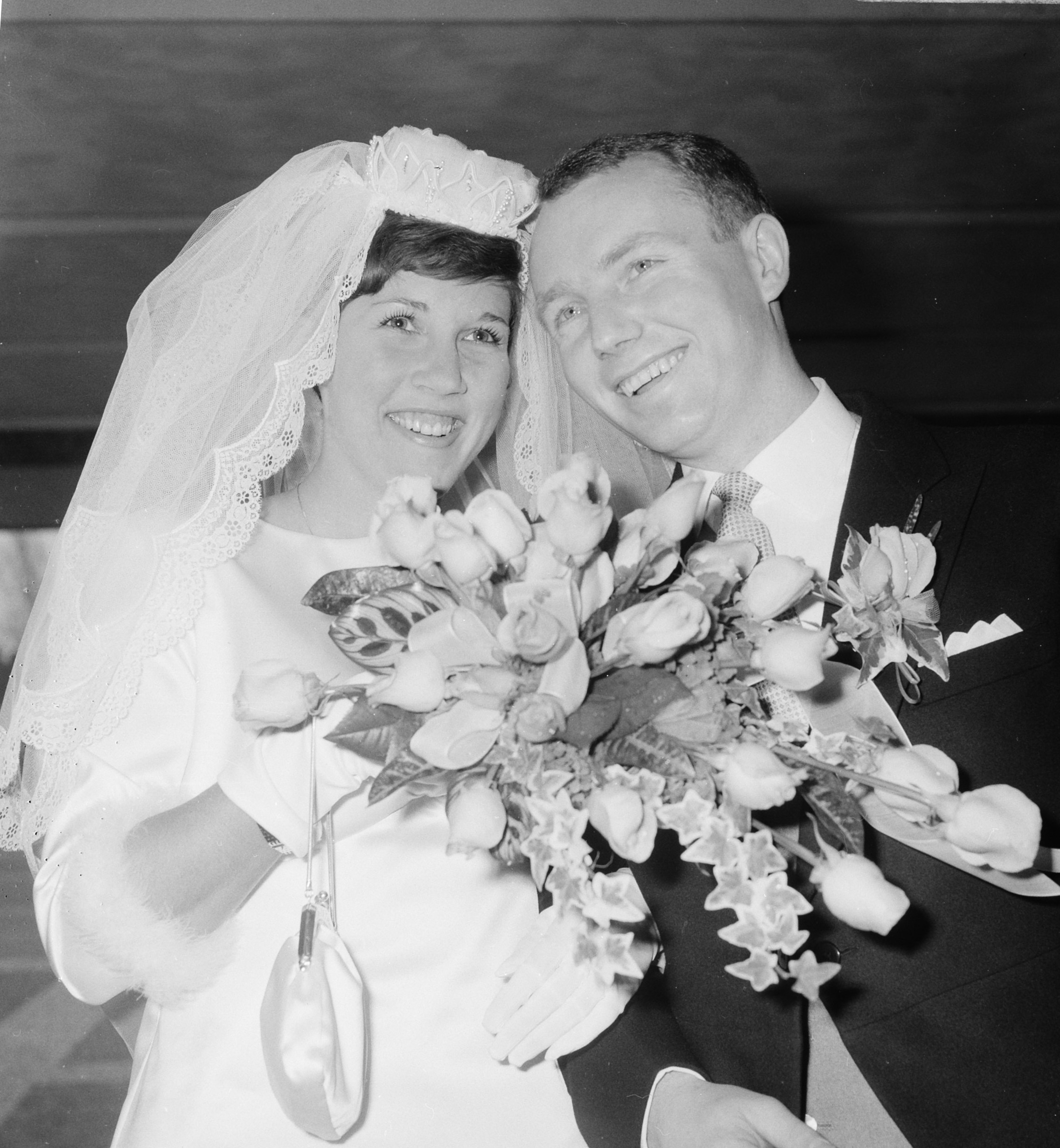
- Imre Rietveld and Knud Aage Nielsen getting married on 17 April 1967

Personal information
- Nickname: Grønært (Green Pea)
- Born: 1 March 1937 (age 89)

Sport
- Country: Denmark
- Sport: Badminton
Medal record
Men's badminton
Representing Denmark
Thomas Cup
Silver medal – second place	1964 Tokyo	Men's team

Knud Aage Nielsen (born 1937) is a retired male badminton player from Denmark.

== Career ==
With a singles game that featured consistency and excellent mobility, Nielsen played at a high international level from the late 1950s through the mid-1960s. In 1964 he won men's singles at the All England Open Badminton Championships, then considered the unofficial World Badminton Championships, narrowly defeating fellow Dane Henning Borch in the final. He played Thomas Cup (men's international team competition) singles for Denmark in the '60–'61 and '63–'64 campaigns, scoring Denmark's only singles victory in its controversial '64 Challenge Round loss to Indonesia.

He is the younger brother of Poul-Erik Nielsen three times an All England doubles champion.

Nielsen appeared in the Danish TV series Make badminton great again from 2022 about the history of Danish badminton.

== Achievements ==
=== International tournaments (11 titles, 12 runners-up) ===
Men's singles
Year	Tournament	Opponent	Score	Result
1958	Norwegian International	(Sweden) Berndt Dahlberg	15–11, 12–15, 15–9	(gold) Winner
1959	Dutch Open	(Indonesia) Ferry Sonneville	18–13, 15–9	(gold) Winner
1959	Belgian International	(Indonesia) Ferry Sonneville	15–13, 15–2	(gold) Winner
1962	Swedish Open	(Denmark) Erland Kops	4–15, 9–15	(silver) Runner-up
1962	Nordic Championships	(Sweden) Bertil Glans	15–9, 15–0	(gold) Winner
1963	Swedish Open	(Denmark) Erland Kops	2–15, 15–13, 4–15	(silver) Runner-up
1963	Nordic Championships	(Denmark) Henning Borch	15–8, 6–15, 17–16	(gold) Winner
1964	German Open	(Denmark) Erland Kops	7–15, 13–15	(silver) Runner-up
1964	All England	(Denmark) Henning Borch	8–15, 17–15, 15–4	(gold) Winner
1964	Nordic Championships	(Denmark) Erland Kops	5–15, 7–15	(silver) Runner-up
1966	Dutch Open	(Germany) Wolfgang Bochow	18–15, 15–9	(gold) Winner
1966	German Open	(Denmark) Erland Kops	18–17, 6–15, 11–15	(silver) Runner-up
1966	Denmark Open	(Denmark) Svend Pri	3–15, 9–15	(silver) Runner-up

Men's doubles
Year	Tournament	Partner	Opponent	Score	Result
1959	Belgian International	(Denmark) Bjorn Holst-Christensen	(England) Hugh Findlay (England) Ronald Lockwood	13–15, 2–15	(silver) Runner-up
1959	Swedish Open	(Denmark) Henning Borch	(Sweden) Berndt Dahlberg (Sweden) Bertil Glans	15–6, 13–15, 11–15	(silver) Runner-up
1961	Dutch Open	(Denmark) Ole Mertz	(Malaysia) Wong B. K. (Malaysia) Yeoh Kean Hua	18–15, 15–9	(gold) Winner
1962	Swedish Open	(Denmark) Henning Borch	(Denmark) Finn Kobberø (Denmark) Jørgen Hammergaard Hansen	14–15, 15–7, 4–15	(silver) Runner-up
1962	Nordic Championships	(Denmark) Poul-Erik Nielsen	(Sweden) Bertil Glans (Sweden) Göran Wahlqvist	15–3, 14–17, 16–17	(silver) Runner-up
1963	Swedish Open	(Denmark) Henning Borch	(Denmark) Erland Kops (Denmark) Poul-Erik Nielsen	15–11, 15–9	(gold) Winner
1963	Nordic Championships	(Denmark) Henning Borch	(Sweden) Berndt Dahlberg (Sweden) Bertil Glans	18–13, 18–15	(gold) Winner
1965	Swedish Open	(Denmark) Erland Kops	(Denmark) Henning Borch (Denmark) Jørgen Mortensen	15–12, 18–16	(gold) Winner
1966	Dutch Open	(Denmark) Elo Hansen	(Malaysia) Punch Gunalan (Malaysia) Oon Chong Hau	4–15, 4–15	(silver) Runner-up

Mixed doubles
Year	Tournament	Partner	Opponent	Score	Result
1964	German Open	(Denmark) Kirsten Thorndahl	(Denmark) Finn Kobberø (Denmark) Bente Flindt	9–15, 10–15	(silver) Runner-up
