= 1961 Thomas Cup =

1961 Thomas Cup Piala Thomas 1961
Tournament details
- Dates: 1 – 11 June 1961
- Edition: 5th
- Level: International
- Nations: 5
- Venue: Istora Gelora Bung Karno
- Location: Jakarta, Indonesia

The 1961 Thomas Cup competition is an international team tournament for supremacy in men's badminton (Its female counterpart is the Uber Cup). Beginning in 1948–49 it was held every three years until 1982 and thereafter every two years. Nineteen teams, eighteen of them starting from four regional qualifying zones, Asia, Australasia, Europe, and Pan America, contested for the Thomas Cup during the 1960-1961 seasons. Zone winners then played-off in Jakarta, Indonesia for the right to face defending champion Indonesia (exempt from all earlier ties), in a conclusive challenge round. For a more detailed description of the Thomas Cup format, see Wikipedia's general article on the Thomas Cup.

This was the first international multi-sport event hosted by Indonesia, who was only 15 years old at the time. The venue was the Istora Gelora Bung Karno, which was only opened on 11 days before the tournament.

== Qualification ==
Means of qualification	Date	Venue	Slot	Qualified teams
1958 Thomas Cup	5 – 15 June 1958	Singapore	1	Indonesia
Asian Zone	30 July 1961 – 29 March 1961	Bangkok; Hong Kong; Lahore	1	Thailand
American Zone	24 – 25 February 1961	Toronto	1	United States
European Zone	14 November 1961 – 12 March 1961	Greenock; Derry; Paris; Southend-on-Sea; Stockholm; Trollhättan	1	Denmark
Australasian Zone	22 – 23 July 1961	Feilding; Melbourne	1	Australia
Total			5	

Despite missing its known singles player, Charoen Wattanasin, Thailand again prevailed in the Asian zone by beating India (6–3), three-time former champion Malaya (7–2), and Pakistan (8–1). Of note in these ties, Nandu Natekar had a hand in all of the individual matches which India salvaged, while Malaya's Eddie Choong, well past his prime at a fairly young age, was beaten in both of his singles. No player on Thailand's team was more than twenty-four years old.

For the second straight time Japan defaulted an Australasian zone tie, this time allowing Australia, led by Kenneth Turner, to advance to the inter-zone phase after its 8–1 victory over New Zealand. Star-studded Denmark coasted through three ties in the European zone, shutting out its usual victim England in the zone final. The same two-way American zone race ended as before with the United States beating Canada 7–2. Evergreen Joe Alston and Wynn Rogers still led the way in doubles for the USA which also had a small but competent cadre of international level singles players.

== Knockout stage ==
The following teams, shown by region, qualified for the 1961 Thomas Cup. Defending champion and host Indonesia automatically qualified to defend their title.

=== Bracket ===
First round
Indonesia
Bye
1 June 1958 – Jakarta
Australia	0
Thailand	9
3 June 1958 – Jakarta
United States	2
Denmark	7

Second round
Indonesia
Bye
6 June 1961 – Jakarta
Thailand	7
Denmark	2

Challenge round
10 June 1961 – Jakarta
Indonesia	6
Thailand	3

=== First round ===
1 June 1961
2 June 1961

Thailand	9–0	Australia
Report

Istora Gelora Bung Karno, Indonesia

3 June 1961
4 June 1961

Denmark	7–2	United States
Report

Istora Gelora Bung Karno, Indonesia

=== Second round ===
6 June 1961
7 June 1961

Denmark	2–7	Thailand
Report

Istora Gelora Bung Karno, Indonesia

=== Final ===
10 June 1961
11 June 1961

Indonesia	6–3	Thailand
Report

Istora Gelora Bung Karno, Indonesia

1961 Thomas Cup winner

Indonesia
Second title
